= 1963 Kentucky Derby =

Horse race

89th Kentucky Derby
- Kentucky Derby
- Grade I stakes race
- Location: Churchill Downs
- Date: May 4, 1963
- Winning horse: Chateaugay
- Jockey: Braulio Baeza
- Trainer: James P. Conway
- Owner: Darby Dan Farm
- Surface: Dirt

The 1963 Kentucky Derby was the 89th running of the Kentucky Derby. The race took place on May 4, 1963.

== Full results ==
Finished	Post	Horse	Jockey	Trainer	Owner	Time / behind
1st	1	Chateaugay	Braulio Baeza	James P. Conway	Darby Dan Farm	
2nd	6	Never Bend	Manuel Ycaza	Woody Stephens	Cain Hoy Stable	
3rd	9	Candy Spots	Bill Shoemaker	Meshach A. Tenney	Rex Ellsworth	
4th	8	On My Honor	Paul Frey	James D. Jordan	Ambush Stable (Mike & Jack Stein)	
5th	7	No Robbery	John L. Rotz	John M. Gaver Sr.	Greentree Stable	
6th	3	Bonjour	Ismael Valenzuela	Hirsch Jacobs	Patrice Jacobs	
7th	5	Gray Pet	Avelino Gomez	Julian J. Serna Jr.	Walnut Hill Farm	
8th	2	Investor	Frank Callico	F. A. Stone	Joseph J. Cherock	
9th	4	Royal Tower	Gilbert Hernandez	V. F. Fulton	Bernard J. Ridder	

- Winning Breeder: John W. Galbreath; (KY)
