= 1963 in sports =

1963 in sports describes the year's events in world sport.

== American football ==
- NFL Championship: the Chicago Bears won 14–10 over the New York Giants at Wrigley Field
- January 29 – First inductees into the Pro Football Hall of Fame are announced
- September 7 – the Pro Football Hall of Fame opens in Canton, Ohio with 17 charter members.
- Rose Bowl (1962 season):
  - The Southern California Trojans won 42–37 over the Wisconsin Badgers to win the college football national championship. This is the first postseason bowl game to feature the #1 and #2 ranked teams in the country.
- AFL Eastern Division Playoff – Boston Patriots win 26–8 over the Buffalo Bills
- AFL Championship – San Diego Chargers win 51–10 over the Boston Patriots on January 5, 1964
- The Heisman Trophy – Roger Staubach, Navy
- Instant replay is used for the first time during the broadcast of the Army–Navy Game.

== Association football ==
- FA Cup final – Manchester United won 3–1 over Leicester City
- August 24 – Founding of the German Football League – Bundesliga

== Athletics ==
- May – Athletics at the 1963 Pan American Games held in São Paulo

== Australian rules football ==
- Victorian Football League
  - Geelong wins the 67th VFL Premiership (Geelong 15.19 (109) d Hawthorn 8.12 (60))
  - Brownlow Medal awarded to Bob Skilton (South Melbourne)

== Bandy ==
- 1963 Bandy World Championship is held in Sweden and won by Soviet Union.

== Baseball ==
Hall of Famer Sandy Koufax

- June 22 – Phillies center fielder Tony Gonzalez plays his 200th straight errorless game to help rookie Ray Culp beat Roger Craig and the Mets 2–0.
- World Series – Los Angeles Dodgers win 4 games to 0 over the New York Yankees. The series MVP is Sandy Koufax, Los Angeles.

== Basketball ==
- NCAA Men's Basketball Championship –
  - Loyola (Illinois) wins 60–58 over Cincinnati
- NBA Finals –
  - Boston Celtics win 4 games to 2 over the Los Angeles Lakers
- Basketball World Championship –
  - Brazil World Champion

== Boxing ==
- July 22 – Sonny Liston defends the Heavyweight Championship of the world by knocking out Floyd Patterson in the 1st round of their rematch in Las Vegas.
- August 27 to September 7 – Pan American Games held in São Paulo, Brazil.

== Canadian football ==
- Grey Cup – Hamilton Tiger-Cats win 21–10 over the B.C. Lions

== Cycling ==
- Giro d'Italia won by Franco Balmamion of Italy
- Tour de France – Jacques Anquetil of France
- UCI Road World Championships – Men's road race – Benoni Beheyt of Belgium

== Figure skating ==
- World Figure Skating Championships
  - Men's champion: Donald McPherson, Canada
  - Ladies' champion: Sjoukje Dijkstra, Netherlands
  - Pair skating champions: Marika Kilius & Hans-Jürgen Bäumler, Germany
  - Ice dancing champions: Eva Romanová & Pavel Roman, Czechoslovakia

== Golf ==
Men's professional

- Masters Tournament – Jack Nicklaus
- U.S. Open – Julius Boros
- British Open – Bob Charles
- PGA Championship – Jack Nicklaus
- PGA Tour money leader – Arnold Palmer – $128,230
- Ryder Cup – United States wins 23 to 9 over Britain in team golf.

Men's amateur

- British Amateur – Michael Lunt
- U.S. Amateur – Deane Beman

Women's professional

- Women's Western Open – Mickey Wright
- LPGA Championship – Mickey Wright
- U.S. Women's Open – Mary Mills
- Titleholders Championship – Marilynn Smith
- LPGA Tour money leader – Mickey Wright – $31,269

== Harness racing ==
- United States Pacing Triple Crown races –
  1. Cane Pace – Meadow Skipper
  2. Little Brown Jug – Overtrick
  3. Messenger Stakes – Overtrick
- Speedy Scot won the Triple Crown of Harness Racing for Triple Crown races –
  1. Hambletonian – Speedy Scott
  2. Yonkers Trot – Speedy Scott
  3. Kentucky Futurity – Speedy Scott
- Australian Inter Dominion Harness Racing Championship –
  - Pacers: Cardigan Bay

== Horse racing ==
Steeplechases

- Cheltenham Gold Cup – Mill House
- Grand National – Ayala

Flat races

- Australia – Melbourne Cup won by Gatum Gatum
- Canadian Triple Crown:
  1. Queen's Plate – Canebora
  2. Prince of Wales Stakes – Canebora
  3. Breeders' Stakes – Canebora
  - Canebora becomes the country's second Triple Crown winner, and the last until 1989.
- France – Prix de l'Arc de Triomphe won by Exbury
- Ireland – Irish Derby Stakes won by Ragusa
- English Triple Crown:
  1. 2,000 Guineas Stakes – Only for Life
  2. The Derby – Relko
  3. St. Leger Stakes – Ragusa
- United States Triple Crown:
  1. Kentucky Derby – Chateaugay
  2. Preakness Stakes – Candy Spots
  3. Belmont Stakes – Chateaugay

== Ice Hockey ==
- Stanley Cup – Toronto Maple Leafs defeat the Detroit Red Wings 4 games to 1.

== Radiosport ==
- Third Amateur Radio Direction Finding European Championship held in Vilnius, Lithuania.

== Rugby league ==
- 1963 New Zealand rugby league season
- 1963 NSWRFL season
- 1962–63 Northern Rugby Football League season / 1963–64 Northern Rugby Football League season
- 1963–64 Kangaroo tour of Great Britain and France

== Rugby union ==
- 69th Five Nations Championship series is won by England
- New Zealand All Blacks team tours Great Britain and is defeated only once: 3–0 by Newport RFC on 30 October

== Swimming ==
- July 27 – US swimmer Susan Pitt breaks the world record in the women's 200m butterfly (long course) during a meet in Philadelphia, clocking 2:29.1.

== Tennis ==
Australia

- Australian Men's Singles Championship – Roy Emerson (Australia) defeats Ken Fletcher (Australia) 6–3, 6–3, 6–1
- Australian Women's Singles Championship – Margaret Smith Court (Australia) defeats Jan Lehane O'Neill (Australia) 6–2, 6–2

England

- Wimbledon Men's Singles Championship – Chuck McKinley (USA) defeats Fred Stolle (Australia) 9–7, 6–1, 6–4
- Wimbledon Women's Singles Championship – Margaret Smith Court (Australia) defeats Billie Jean King (USA) 6–3, 6–4

France

- French Men's Singles Championship – Roy Emerson (Australia) defeats Pierre Darmon (France) 3–6, 6–1, 6–4, 6–4
- French Women's Singles Championship – Lesley Turner (Australia) defeats Ann Haydon Jones (Great Britain) 2–6, 6–3, 7–5

USA

- American Men's Singles Championship – Rafael Osuna (Mexico) defeats Frank Froehling (USA) 7–5, 6–4, 6–2
- American Women's Singles Championship – Maria Bueno (Brazil) defeats Margaret Smith (Australia) 7–5, 6–4

Events

- Federation Cup – USA 2–1 Australia (inaugural event)

Davis Cup

- 1963 Davis Cup – United States 3–2 Australia at Memorial Drive Tennis Centre (grass) Adelaide, Australia

== Volleyball ==
- Volleyball at the 1963 Pan American Games in São Paulo won by Brazil (both men's and women's tournaments)

== Multi-sport events ==
- Fourth Pan American Games held in São Paulo, Brazil
- Fourth Mediterranean Games held in Naples, Italy
- Third Summer Universiade held in Porto Alegre, Brazil

== Awards ==
- Associated Press Male Athlete of the Year – Sandy Koufax (Major League Baseball)
- Associated Press Female Athlete of the Year – Mickey Wright (LPGA golf)
- ABC's Wide World of Sports Athlete of the year: Valery Brumel (track and field)
- Sports Illustrated Sportsman of the Year: Pete Rozelle NFL
