= Sunset Handicap =

- Class: Grade III
- Location: Hollywood Park Racetrack; Inglewood, California, United States
- Inaugurated: 1938
- Race type: Thoroughbred - Flat racing
- Website: www.hollywoodpark.com

Race information
- Distance: 1 1/2 miles (12 furlongs)
- Surface: Turf
- Track: Left-handed
- Qualification: Three-year-olds & up
- Weight: Assigned
- Purse: $150,000

The Sunset Handicap was an American Thoroughbred horse race run annually during the third week of July at Hollywood Park Racetrack in inglewood, California. The Grade III event is open to horses, age three and up, willing to race one and one-half miles on turf. With the closure of Hollywood Park at the end of 2013 the Sunset Handicap ceased to exist.

Inaugurated in 1938 as the Aloha Handicap, in 1940 it was renamed the Sunset Handicap. It was raced on dirt until 1967. Since inception it has been contested at various distances:

- 9 furlongs : 1938, 1950
- 12 furlongs : 1939, 1940, 1967–1968, 1973–present
- 13 furlongs : 1941, 1946–1949, 1951–1966
- 16 furlongs : 1969-1972

In 1975, the Sunset Handicap was run in two divisions.

On December 2, 2009, this Grade II stakes race was downgraded to a Grade III by the American Graded Stakes Committee.

== Historical notes ==
- In 1976, trainer Charles Whittingham saddled the first three finishers.

== Records ==
Speed record: (at current distance of 1 1/2 miles)

- 2:23.55 - Talloires (1996)

Most wins:

- 2 - Whodunit (1959, 1961)

Most wins by a jockey:

- 13 - Bill Shoemaker (1956, 1958, 1962, 1964, 1967, 1973, 1974, 1975, 1977, 1978, 1980, 1981, 1987)

Most wins by a trainer:

- 11 - Charles Whittingham (1973, 1974, 1976, 1978, 1979, 1980, 1981, 1982, 1983, 1987, 1992)

== Winners ==
Year	Winner	Age	Jockey	Trainer	Owner	Time
2013	Marketing Mix (mare)	5	Gary Stevens	Tom Proctor	Glen Hill Farm	2:26.78
2012	Dhaamer (IRE)	5	Julien Leparoux	Mike Mitchell	Edward Brown Jr. / Jay Manoogian	2:29.13
2011	Imponente	5	Chantal Sutherland	A.C. Avila	Jessica Coudelaria	2:26.65
2010	Marlang	5	Joel Rosario	Neil D. Drysdale	Gustav Schickedanz	2:25.45
2009	Black Astor	5	Joseph Talamo	Lisa L. Lewis	A Breed Apart, LLC & Stephen R. Humphrey	2:27.10
2008	Warning Zone	4	Mike Smith	John W. Sadler	Rising Sun Racing Stable	2:26.95
2007	Runaway Dancer	8	Alex Solis	Dan L. Hendricks	R L Stables (Michael & Katie Kennedy)	2:27.68
2006	T.H. Approval	5	Alex Solis	Eduardo Inda	Tadahiro Hotehama	2:26.65
2005	Always First	4	Victor Espinoza	Neil D. Drysdale	Sheikh Mohammed	2:27.00
2004	Star Over The Bay	4	Tyler Baze	Mike Mitchell	G Racing et al.	2:26.47
2003	Puerto Banus	4	Victor Espinoza	Kristin Mulhall	Steve Taub et al.	2:26.95
2002	Grammarian	4	Brice Blanc	Kellyn Gorder	Lindsey Williams	2:26.59
2001	Blueprint	6	Gary Stevens	Robert B. Hess Jr.	Fog City Stable (David Shimmon & William Bianco)	2:26:16
2000	Bienamado	4	Chris McCarron	J. Paco Gonzalez	J. Toffan/T. McCaffery	2:25.06
1999	Plicck	4	David Flores	Ron McAnally	Al & Sandee Kirkwood	2:26.97
1998	River Bay	5	Alex Solis	Robert Frankel	Henri Chalhoub	2:27.40
1997	Marlin	4	David Flores	D. Wayne Lukas	Michael Tabor	2:25.39
1996	Talloires	6	Kent Desormeaux	Edwin J. Gregson	Randall D. Hubbard, et al.	2:23.55
1995	Sandpit	6	Corey Nakatani	Richard E. Mandella	Sierra Thoroughbreds	2:25.50
1994	Grand Flotilla	7	Gary Stevens	Jenine Sahadi	Mike Sloan	2:26.35
1993	Bien Bien	4	Chris McCarron	J. Paco Gonzalez	J. Toffan & T. McCaffery	2:25.69
1992	Qathif	5	Alex Solis	Charles Whittingham	Ann & Jerry Moss	2:26.72
1991	Black Monday	5	Corey Nakatani	Gary F. Jones	Abrams, Hicker & Lima	2:26.00
1990	Petite Ile	4	Corey Black	Edwin J. Gregson	Jean-Francois Malle	2:25.60
1989	Pranke	5	Pat Valenzuela	Edwin J. Gregson	Hector Sanchez	2:28.00
1988	Roi Normand	5	Fernando Toro	Robert Frankel	Edmund A. Gann	2:24.60
1987	Swink	4	Bill Shoemaker	Charles Whittingham	Nelson Bunker Hunt	2:25.00
1986	Zoffany	6	Eddie Delahoussaye	John Gosden	A. Speelman / J. & A. Bodie	2:25.20
1985	Kings Island	4	Fernando Toro	Jerry M. Fanning	Dan Agnew & Charles Baumbach	2:25.80
1984	John Henry	9	Chris McCarron	Ron McAnally	Dotsam Stable	2:24.80
1983	Craelius	4	Chris McCarron	Charles Whittingham	Howard B. Keck	2:26.40
1982	Erins Isle	4	Angel Cordero Jr.	Charles Whittingham	Brian Sweeney, et al.	2:25.60
1981	Galaxy Libra	5	Bill Shoemaker	Charles Whittingham	Louis R. Rowan	2:25.80
1980	Inkerman	5	Bill Shoemaker	Charles Whittingham	Edward Hudson Sr.	2:24.40
1979	Sirlad	5	Darrel McHargue	Charles Whittingham	Abram S. Hewitt	2:24.00
1978	Exceller	5	Bill Shoemaker	Charles Whittingham	Nelson Bunker Hunt	2:27.00
1977	Today 'n Tomorrow	4	Bill Shoemaker	Roger Clapp	Connie M. Ring	2:27.60
1976	Caucasus	4	Fernando Toro	Charles Whittingham	Fred Sahadi	2:26.40
1975	Barclay Joy	5	Bill Shoemaker	A. Thomas Doyle	John McShain	2:26.80
1975	Cruiser II	6	Frank Olivares	Ron McAnally	Contreras, Mamakos & Stubrin	2:27.00
1974	Greco II	5	Bill Shoemaker	Charles Whittingham	E. E. Fogelson	2:27.00
1973	Cougar II	7	Bill Shoemaker	Charles Whittingham	Mary F. Jones	2:26.00
1972	Typecast (mare)	6	Johnny Sellers	A. Thomas Doyle	Westerly Stud	3:20.60
1971	Over The Counter	7	Jerry Lambert	Robert Frankel	H. T. Sheridan	3:19.20
1970	One For All	4	Laffit Pincay Jr.	Horatio Luro	John A. Bell III	3:21.80
1969	Petrone	5	Johnny Sellers	Robert L. Wheeler	Flag Is Up Farms & E. Constantine	3:18.00
1968	Fort Marcy	4	Laffit Pincay Jr.	J. Elliott Burch	Rokeby Stable	2:26.60
1967	Hill Clown	4	Bill Shoemaker	William B. Finnegan	El Peco Ranch	2:27.80
1966	O'Hara	4	Donald Pierce	William J. Hirsch	Greentree Stable	2:40.40
1965	Terry's Secret	3	Alex Maese	Carl A. Roles	Poltex Stable (William R. Hawn et al.)	2:41.80
1964	Colorado King	5	Bill Shoemaker	Wally Dunn	Poltex Stable (William R. Hawn et al.)	2:40.80
1963	Arbitrage	5	Pete Moreno	Reggie Cornell	Linda Cornell	2:41.20
1962	Prove It	5	Bill Shoemaker	Mesh Tenney	Rex C. Ellsworth	2:39.60
1961	Whodunit	6	Manuel Ycaza	William C. Winfrey	Mrs. Jan Burke	2:39.00
1960	Dotted Swiss	4	Edward Burns	Robert L. Wheeler	C. V. Whitney	2:40.20
1959	Whodunit	4	Raymond York	William C. Winfrey	Mrs. Jan Burke	2:40.80
1958	Gallant Man	4	Bill Shoemaker	John A. Nerud	Ralph Lowe	2:41.00
1957	Find	7	Ralph Neves	William C. Winfrey	Alfred G. Vanderbilt II	2:40.00
1956	Swaps	4	Bill Shoemaker	Mesh Tenney	Rex C. Ellsworth	2:38.20
1955	Social Outcast	5	Eric Guerin	William C. Winfrey	Alfred G. Vanderbilt II	2:40.60
1954	Fleet Bird	5	Ralph Neves	Horace A. Jones	Calumet Farm	2:40.80
1953	Lights Up	6	Jack Westrope	Hack Ross	Clifford H. Jones & Sons	2:41.20
1952	Great Circle	5	Reg Heather	Warren Stute	John T. de Blois Wack	2:41.80
1951	Alderman	4	Jack Westrope	Willie Dennis	Breel Stable (George C. Newell)	2:42.00
1950	Hill Prince	3	Eddie Arcaro	Casey Hayes	Christopher Chenery	1:48.60
1949	Ace Admiral	4	Johnny Longden	William Molter	Maine Chance Farm	2:39.80
1948	Drumbeat	3	Thearl Williams	Jack T. Engle	Andrea Leeds Howard	2:41.00
1947	Cover Up	4	Robert Permane	Ross Brinson	Zack T. Addington	2:41.20
1946	Historian	5	Ovie Scurlock	Edward Anspach	Herbert Woolf	2:40.80
1945	NO RACE					
1944	NO RACE					
1943	NO RACE					
1942	NO RACE					
1941	King Torch	4	Johnny Deering	Graceton Philpot	Louis B. Mayer	2:44.40
1940	Kayak II	5	John H. Adams	Tom Smith	Charles S. Howard	2:30.20
1939	Sorteado	4	Ralph Neves	Tom Smith	Charles S. Howard	2:29.00
1938	Ligaroti	7	Noel Richardson	Lindsay C. Howard	Binglin Stable	1:50.40

=== Other North American Marathon races ===
On dirt:

- Gallant Man Handicap
- Brooklyn Handicap
- Fort Harrod Stakes
- Tokyo City Cup
- Valedictory Stakes

On turf:

- Canadian International Stakes
- Carleton F. Burke Handicap
- San Juan Capistrano Invitational Handicap
- Stars and Stripes Handicap
- San Luis Obispo Handicap
- San Luis Rey Handicap
