= Diamond Shoal =

British-bred Thoroughbred racehorse

- Racing silks of Paul Mellon
- Sire: Mill Reef
- Grandsire: Never Bend
- Dam: Crown Treasure
- Damsire: Graustark
- Sex: Stallion
- Foaled: 6 May 1979
- Country: United Kingdom
- Colour: Bay
- Breeder: Paul Mellon
- Owner: Paul Mellon
- Trainer: Ian Balding
- Record: 24: 8-5-2

Major wins
- John Porter Stakes (1983); Grand Prix d'Evry (1983); Gran Premio di Milano (1983); Grand Prix de Saint-Cloud (1983); Grosser Preis von Baden (1983)

Awards
- Timeform rating: 101 (1981), 121 (1982), 130 (1983); Top-rated European older male (1983); Timeform top-rated older male (1983); Gilbey Racing Middle Distance Champion (1983); Gilbey Racing Champion Racehorse of Europe (1983)

Diamond Shoal (6 May 1979 – ca.1996) was a British Thoroughbred racehorse and sire. He showed some promise as a two-year-old, winning two of his six races. In the following year he won only one minor race but was placed in several major races, including a third-place finish in the St Leger Stakes. In 1983, Diamond Shoal emerged as a leading middle-distance performer, winning the John Porter Stakes in England, the Grand Prix d'Evry and Grand Prix de Saint-Cloud in France, the Gran Premio di Milano in Italy and the Grosser Preis von Baden in Germany. He was widely regarded as the best older male racehorse in Europe in 1983. He was retired to stud at the end of the year but had little success as a sire of winners.

== Background ==
Diamond Shoal was a bay horse with a white sock on his left hind leg bred by his owner Paul Mellon. He was sired by Mellon's stallion Mill Reef and American-bred horse who won the Epsom Derby, King George VI and Queen Elizabeth Stakes and Prix de l'Arc de Triomphe in 1971. Mill Reef's other offspring included Reference Point, Milligram, Shirley Heights, Lashkari and Doyoun. Diamond Shoal was the second foal of his dam Crown Treasure, a daughter of Graustark who was sent to Europe in to be covered by Mill Reef and remained there for several years owing to import restrictions. A year before Diamond Shoal was foaled, Crown Treasure had produced his full-brother Glint of Gold, an outstanding middle-distance performer who won the Derby Italiano, Grand Prix de Paris, Grand Prix de Saint-Cloud, Grosser Preis von Baden. Crown Treasure later produced Crystal Spirit, a leading hurdler who won the Sun Alliance Hurdle and the Cleeve Hurdle in 1991.

Like many of Mellon's best horses, Glint of Gold was trained at Kingsclere in Hampshire by Ian Balding. He was named after a dangerous area of sandbanks near Cape Hatteras.

== Racing career ==
=== 1981: two-year-old season ===
Diamond Shoal began his racing career by winning a six furlong maiden race at Bath Racecourse in June, when he finished strongly to win from Bold Saracen. He then finished second in the Donnington Castle Stakes at Newbury Racecourse, before carrying top-weight to victory in a nursery handicap at Brighton in August. He was then moved up in class and finished fourth behind Zilos if the Group Three Seaton Delaval Stakes over seven furlongs at Newcastle. On his last two appearances of the season he finished unplaced when carrying heavy weights in handicaps.

=== 1982: three-year-old season ===
Diamond Shoal began his three-year-old season by winning a handicap over nine furlongs at Epsom Downs Racecourse in June. He failed to win in eight subsequent starts but was placed in several major races and established himself as a high-class middle distance performer. He appeared to be rather unlucky when finishing fifth and then ran second to Touching Wood in the Welsh Derby. He was then sent abroad for the first time and finished second to Anno in the Bayerisches Zuchtrennen. On his return to England he finished second by three-quarters of a length to Electric in the Great Voltigeur Stakes, with Touching Wood seven lengths back in third place.

On 9 September at Doncaster Racecourse Diamond Shoal started at odds of 9/1 for the St Leger Stakes. He was held up towards the back of the field by John Matthias before switching to the outside to make a challenge in the straight. He reached third place a furlong and a half from the finish but could make no further progress and was beaten one and a half lengths and two and a half lengths by Touching Wood and Zilos. In October the colt was sent to Germany for the second time to contest the Preis Von Europa over 2400 metres at Cologne. He started 5/2 favourite but finished third of the sixteen runners behind Ataxerexes. In October the colt was one of Britain's two representatives (alongside Awaasif) for the Washington, D.C. International Stakes at Laurel Park where he finished fourth behind the French mare April Run. At the end of the season Timeform expressed the view that the colt would be more successful if he were to be ridden in a way that would make greater use of his stamina.

=== 1983: four-year-old season ===
Diamond Shoal began his third season in the John Porter Stakes over one and a half miles at Newbury in April and recorded his first success in ten months as he won decisively by three lengths from Little Wolf. In the Jockey Club Stakes at Newmarket two weeks later he was held up for a late run but was never able to reach the leaders and finished fifth behind Electric. In May he was sent to France for the first time and was ridden by Cash Asmussen in the Grand Prix d'Evry. Starting favourite he tracked the leaders before winning easily by one and a half lengths although he caused some alarm after passing the post when he swerved violently to the right. Asmussen said that the colt had seemed to be trying to return to the racecourse stables.

On his next appearance Diamond Shoal ran in the Coronation Cup at Epsom on 2 June. He led and set a moderate pace before being overtaken in the closing stages and finishing fourth of the five runners behind Be My Native. He was then sent to Italy where he recorded a very easy four length victory over Easter Sun, in the Gran Premio di Milano, becoming the first British-trained to win the race since its inception in 1924. In early July, Diamond Shoal ran again in France when he contested the Group One Grand Prix de Saint-Cloud over 2500 metres. He started at odds of 9.6/1 in a field which included Lancastrian (Prix Ganay), Electric, Zalataia (Oak Tree Invitational Stakes), Lemhi Gold and All Along. Ridden by Steve Cauthen, Diamond Shoal raced in second behind Lemhi Gold before taking the lead 300m from the finish and winning comfortably by three-quarters of a length from Lancastrian with Zalataia in third place. Diamond Shoal was emulating his brother Glint of Gold who had won the race in 1982. On 23 July Diamond Shoal was one of nine horses to contest the thirty-third running of Britain's most prestigious all-aged race, the King George VI and Queen Elizabeth Stakes over one and a half miles at Ascot. Ridden for the only time by Lester Piggott, he started fourth favourite at odds of 8/1 behind the three-year-olds Caerleon and Sun Princess and the four-year-old filly Time Charter. With the other runners including Awaasif, Lemhi Gold and Lancastrian. As at Saint-Cloud, he tracked Lemhi Gold in the early stages and took the lead with three furlongs left to run. He held off challenges from Awaasif and Sun Princess and looked the likely winner before being overtaken inside the final furlong and was beaten three-quarters of a length by Time Charter.

On 4 September Diamond Shoal ran in Germany again in the Grosser Preis von Baden in which he was matched against the leading German three-year-old Abary. According to Timeform, the race was "no contest" as Diamond Shoal took the lead 800 metres from the finish and "cantered" to a three and a half length victory. On his final appearance, Diamond Shoal started third favourite for the Prix de l'Arc de Triomphe in October, but failed to reproduce his best form and finished twelfth of the twenty-six runners behind All Along. Plan to continue the colt's career in Japan and the United States were ended when he sustained a hock injury.

== Assessment ==
In 1981 Diamond Shoal was given a rating of 101 by the independent Timeform organisation, 31 pounds below their top-rated two-year-old Wind and Wuthering. In the following year his Timeform rating of 121 placed him 13 pounds behind the top-rated three-year-olds Assert and Green Forest. In the official International Classification he was rated 14 pounds behind the top-rated Golden Fleece. In 1983, Diamond Shoal was given a rating of 130 by Timeform, making him the top-rated older male of the season. He was also the top-rated older male in the official International Classification, and the fifth highest-rated horse of any age behind Shareef Dancer, All Along, Habibti and Caerleon. In the Gilbey Racing awards, based on points accumulated for performances in major races, Diamond Shoal was named "Middle Distance Champion" and "Champion Racehorse of Europe".

== Stud record ==
At the end of his racing career, Diamond Shoal was syndicated and retired to become a breeding stallion at the Walmac-Warnerton farm in Kentucky at an initial fee of $25,000. When he was older, he was exported to Japan. He was not a successful stallion but did sire a few good winners including Stormy Deep, an Ohio-bred gelding who won 17 races between 1989 and 1993. Diamond Shoal's last recorded foals were born in Japan in 1995. He was "put out of stud" in Japan on 11 October 1996.

== Pedigree ==
Pedigree of Diamond Shoal, bay stallion, 1979
Sire Mill Reef (USA) 1968	Never Bend (USA); 1960	Nasrullah	Nearco
Sire Mill Reef (USA) 1968	Never Bend (USA); 1960	Nasrullah	Mumtaz Begum
Sire Mill Reef (USA) 1968	Never Bend (USA); 1960	Lalun	Djeddah
Sire Mill Reef (USA) 1968	Never Bend (USA); 1960	Lalun	Be Faithful
Sire Mill Reef (USA) 1968	Milan Mill (USA); 1962	Princequillo	Prince Rose
Sire Mill Reef (USA) 1968	Milan Mill (USA); 1962	Princequillo	Cosquilla
Sire Mill Reef (USA) 1968	Milan Mill (USA); 1962	Virginia Water	Count Fleet
Sire Mill Reef (USA) 1968	Milan Mill (USA); 1962	Virginia Water	Red Ray
Dam Crown Treasure (USA) 1973	Graustark (USA); 1963	Ribot	Tenerani
Dam Crown Treasure (USA) 1973	Graustark (USA); 1963	Ribot	Romanella
Dam Crown Treasure (USA) 1973	Graustark (USA); 1963	Flower Bowl	Alibhai
Dam Crown Treasure (USA) 1973	Graustark (USA); 1963	Flower Bowl	Flower Bed
Dam Crown Treasure (USA) 1973	Treasure Chest (USA); 1962	Rough 'n Tumble	Free For All
Dam Crown Treasure (USA) 1973	Treasure Chest (USA); 1962	Rough 'n Tumble	Roused
Dam Crown Treasure (USA) 1973	Treasure Chest (USA); 1962	Iltis	War Relic
Dam Crown Treasure (USA) 1973	Treasure Chest (USA); 1962	Iltis	We Hail (Family:21-a)
