= San Vicente Stakes =

- Class: Grade II
- Location: Santa Anita Park; Arcadia, California
- Inaugurated: 1935
- Race type: Thoroughbred – Flat racing
- Website: www.santaanita.com

Race information
- Distance: 7 furlongs
- Surface: Dirt
- Track: Left-handed
- Qualification: Three-year-olds
- Weight: 124 lbs. with allowances
- Purse: $200,000 (since 2014)

The San Vicente Stakes is an American thoroughbred horse race run annually at Santa Anita Park. A Grade II event, the race is open to three-year-old horses willing to race seven furlongs on the dirt and currently carries a purse of $200,000.

== History ==
Inaugurated in 1935 as the San Vicente Handicap, it was open to older horses until 1937. The race was run as a handicap event from 1935 until 1941, 1945 through 1948, 1956 through 1958, and 1960 through 1965. There was no race held from 1942 until 1944, 1949 until 1951, and again in 1970.

In 1952 and 1953 the race was restricted to colts and geldings.

Since inception, it has been run at various distances:

- 6 furlongs : 1935–1936, 1952–54
- 7 furlongs : 1937–1939, 1949–1951, 1955 to present
- 1 mile : 1940–46
- 1 1/16 miles : 1947–1948

Louis B. Mayer's U.S. Racing Hall of Fame filly, Busher, won this race against males in 1945. The filly, Hubble Bubble, won in 1947. In 2009 Evita Argentina became the third filly to win this race in 68 runnings.

The race was once frequently used as an early prep for the Kentucky Derby for horses such as Swaps. Silver Charm, who won the San Vicente in 1997, went on to win that year's Derby and Preakness Stakes. However, because of its sprint distance, it is not part of the official Road to the Kentucky Derby and is now rarely used by Derby hopefuls. An exception was in 2016, when both Nyquist (the eventual Derby winner) and Exaggerator (the eventual Preakness winner) started their three-year-old campaigns in the race.

== Records ==
Speed record:

- 1:20.01 – Georgie Boy (2008) (synthetic surface)
- 1:20.71 – Nyquist (dirt)

Most wins by a jockey:

- 8 – Bill Shoemaker (1955, 1956, 1964, 1965, 1966, 1967, 1976, 1980)

Most wins by a trainer:

- 14 - Bob Baffert (1997, 1999, 2003, 2005, 2006, 2011, 2012, 2013, 2015, 2020, 2021, 2023, 2024, 2025)

Most wins by an owner:

- 3 – Rex C. Ellsworth (1947, 1955, 1956)

== Winners of the San Vicente Stakes ==
Year	Winner	Jockey	Trainer	Owner	Time
2026	So Happy	Mike E. Smith	Mark Glatt	Norman Stables & Saints or Sinners	1:21.12
2025	Barnes	Juan J. Hernandez	Bob Baffert	Zedan Racing	1:22.15
2024	Muth	Juan J. Hernandez	Bob Baffert	Zedan Racing	1:23.01
2023	Havnameltdown	Juan J. Hernandez	Bob Baffert	Mike Pegram, Karl Watson, Paul Weitman	1:22.29
2022	Forbidden Kingdom	Juan J. Hernandez	Richard Mandella	Spendthrift farm LLC, My Racehorse Stable	1:22.75
2021	Concert Tour	Joel Rosario	Bob Baffert	Gary and Mary West	1:24.06
2020	Nadal	Joel Rosario	Bob Baffert	George Bolton, Arthur Hoyeau, Barry Lipman & Mark Mathiesen	1:22.59
2019	Sparky Ville	Joel Rosario	Jeffrey L. Bonde	Del Secco DCS Racing	1:21.93
2018	Kanthaka	Flavien Prat	Jerry Hollendorfer	West Point Thoroughbreds	
2017	Iliad	Flavien Prat	Doug O'Neill	Kaleem Shah	1:21.62
2016	Nyquist	Mario Gutierrez	Doug O'Neill	Reddam Racing	1:20.71
2015	Lord Nelson	Rafael Bejarano	Bob Baffert	Peachtree Stable	1:22.15
2014	Kobe's Back	Joel Rosario	John W. Sadler	C R K Stable	1:21.84
2013	Shakin It Up	David R. Flores	Bob Baffert	Dennis A. Cardoza and Michael E. Pegram	1:22.48
2012	Drill	Martin Garcia	Bob Baffert	Michael E. Pegram, Karl Watson and Paul Weitman	1:21.28
2011	The Factor	Martin Garcia	Bob Baffert	Fog City Stable & George Bolton	1:20.34
2010	Sidney's Candy	Joe Talamo	John W. Sadler	Sid & Jenny Craig Trust	1:20.91
2009	Evita Argentina	Garrett Gomez	John W. Sadler	Halo Farms/Three Sisters Thoroughbreds	1:24.30
2008	Georgie Boy	Rafael Bejarano	Kathy Walsh	George Schwary	1:20.01
2007	Noble Court	Corey Nakatani	John W. Sadler	Joy Ride Racing	1:23.12
2006	Too Much Bling	Garrett Gomez	Bob Baffert	Stonerside/Blazing Meadow	1:22.50
2005	Fusaichi Rock Star	David R. Flores	Bob Baffert	Fusao Sekiguchi	1:22.59
2004	Imperialism	Victor Espinoza	Kristin Mulhall	Steve Taub	1:22.34
2003	Kafwain	Victor Espinoza	Bob Baffert	The Thoroughbred Corp.	1:21.12
2002	Came Home	Chris McCarron	J. Paco Gonzalez	William S. Farish III, John B. Goodman, Trudy McCaffery and John A. Toffan	1:21.92
2001	Early Flyer	Chris McCarron	Ronald McAnally	VHW Stables	1:21.51
2000	Archer City Slew	Kent Desormeaux	Vladimir Cerin	David & Holly Wilson	1:22.18
1999	Exploit	Chris McCarron	Bob Baffert	Robert & Beverly Lewis	1:22.00
1998	Sea of Secrets	Kent Desormeaux	Neil D. Drysdale	Irving & Marjorie Cowan	1:22.00
1997	Silver Charm	Chris McCarron	Bob Baffert	Robert & Beverly Lewis	1:21.07
1996	Afleetaffair	Corey Nakatani	Jerry Hollendorfer	Halo Farms	1:22.28
1995	Afternoon Deelites	Kent Desormeaux	Richard Mandella	Burt Bacharach	1:21.35
1994	Fly'n J. Bryan	Corey Black	Douglas R. Peterson	Joseph Fenley	1:22.32
1993	Yappy	Pat Valenzuela	Gary F. Jones	Allen E. Paulson	1:22.33
1992	Mineral Wells	Pat Valenzuela	D. Wayne Lukas	Lukas & Overbrook	1:21.28
1991	Olympio	Ed Delahoussaye	Ronald McAnally	VHW Stables (Lessee)	1:21.40
1990	Mister Frisky	Gary Stevens	Laz Barrera	Solymar Stud	1:22.60
1989	Gum	Laffit Pincay Jr.	Melvin F. Stute	The Hat Ranch	1:22.40
1988	Mi Preferido	Alex Solis	Laz Barrera	Barrera & Saiden	1:22.60
1987	Stylish Winner	Gary Stevens	Bruce Headley	Johnston, Headley, et al.	1:23.80
1986	Grand Allegiance	Ruben Hernandez	Lou Carno	Dorothy Popkess	1:23.20
1985	The Rogers Four	Chris McCarron	Darrell Vienna	Belaire Thoroughbreds et al.	1:22.80
1984	Fortunate Prospect	Donald Pierce	LeRoy Jolley	Gerald Robins	1:22.80
1983	Shecky Blue	Sandy Hawley	Sid Martin	E. W. Hansen	1:22.40
1982	Unpredictable	Ed Delahoussaye	David LaCroix	Estate of J. W. LaCroix	1:21.20
1981	Flying Nashua	Ángel Cordero Jr.	Laz Barrera	Holman, Jensen & Roncari	1:23.40
1980	Raise a Man	Bill Shoemaker	Chay R. Knight	Northwest Farms	1:21.40
1979	Flying Paster	Donald Pierce	Gordon Campbell	Bernard J. Ridder	1:21.20
1978	Chance Dancer	Richard Culberson	Frank Colee	George Arakelian Farms, Inc.	1:22.20
1977	Replant	Darrel McHargue	Ronald McAnally	Elmendorf Farm	1:21.20
1976	Thermal Energy	Bill Shoemaker	Charlie Whittingham	E. E. Fogelson	1:21.80
1975	Boomie S.	Sandy Hawley	W. Preston King	Irwin Feiner	1:22.00
1974	Triple Crown	Braulio Baeza	W. Preston King	Samuel Lehrman	1:22.60
1973	Ancient Title	Fernando Toro	Keith L. Stucki Sr.	Ethel Kirkland	1:21.00
1972	Solar Salute	Laffit Pincay Jr.	Lou Glauburg	M/M John J. Elmore Sr.	1:21.20
1971	Diplomatic Agent	Laffit Pincay Jr.	Hazel Longden	Hazel Longden	1:21.60
1969	Majestic Prince	Bill Hartack	Johnny Longden	Frank M. McMahon	1:25.60
1968	Dignitas	Manuel Ycaza	James W. Maloney	William Haggin Perry	1:22.00
1967	Tumble Wind	Bill Shoemaker	Charlie Whittingham	Rock Springs Farm	1:22.20
1966	Saber Mountain	Bill Shoemaker	Charlie Whittingham	Howard B. Keck	1:22.40
1965	Lucky Debonair	Bill Shoemaker	Frank Catrone	Ada L. Rice	1:22.00
1964	Wil Rad	Bill Shoemaker	Robert Wingfield	Clark-Radkovich	1:22.60
1963	Mr. Thong	Alex Maese	D. H. Holten	Hudson & Glass	1:23.80
1962	Black Sheep	Rudy Campas	Charlie Whittingham	C. R. Mac Stable	1:23.60
1961	Captain Fair	Donald Pierce	Charles A. Comiskey	Robert S. Le Sage	1:22.40
1960	John William	Ismael Valenzuela	George Auerbach	Merrick Stable	1:22.00
1959	Ole Fols	Manuel Ycaza	William B. Finnegan	Neil S. McCarthy	1:22.40
1958	Old Pueblo	Ralph Neves	Robert L. Wheeler	Jelks & McBean	1:22.60
1957	Buford	Ismael Valenzuela	Willie Alvarado	E. O. Stice & Sons	1:22.00
1956	Terrang	Bill Shoemaker	Mesh Tenney	Rex C. Ellsworth	1:22.80
1955	Swaps	Bill Shoemaker	Mesh Tenney	Rex C. Ellsworth	1:24.00
1954	James Session	Joe Phillippi	Willie Dennis	Betty & Harry James	1:09.40
1953	Chanlea	Eddie Arcaro	Horace A. Jones	Calumet Farm	1:10.60
1952	Hill Gail	Steve Brooks	Horace A. Jones	Calumet Farm	1:10.00
1948	Salmagundi	Johnny Longden	Willie Booth	William G. Helis	1:44.20
1947	Hubble Bubble *	Billy Layton	Mesh Tenney	Rex C. Ellsworth	1:43.40
1946	Air Rate	Harry Pratt	Ralph Lentini	Fred Wyse	1:37.80
1945	Busher	Johnny Longden	George M. Odom	Louis B. Mayer	1:36.60
1941	Good Turn	Carroll Bierman	Lee McCoy	Alfred G. Vanderbilt II	1:38.20
1940	Gallahadion	Basil James	Roy Waldron	Milky Way Farm Stable	1:38.80
1939	Impound	Silvio Coucci	Bud Stotler	Alfred G. Vanderbilt II	1:23.00
1938	Sun Egret	Alfred Shelhamer	H. Guy Bedwell	A. C. Compton	1:25.40
1937	Merry Maker	Johnny Longden	Willie A. Shea	Myrtle Shea	1:27.40
1936	Time Supply (5)	Tommy Luther	Carl A. Roles	Frank A. Carreaud	1:10.20
1935	Trumpery (4)	Raymond Workman	John A. Healey	C. V. Whitney	1:10.00
