= Prove It (horse) =

American-bred Thoroughbred racehorse

- Sire: Endeavour
- Grandsire: British Empire
- Dam: Time To Khal
- Damsire: Khaled
- Sex: Stallion
- Foaled: 1957
- Country: United States
- Colour: Bay
- Breeder: Rex C. Ellsworth
- Owner: Rex C. Ellsworth
- Trainer: Mesh Tenney
- Record: 25: 15-4-1
- Earnings: US$613,820

Major wins
- San Fernando Stakes (1961); Santa Anita Maturity (1961); Santa Anita Handicap (1961); Inglewood Handicap (1962); Sunset Handicap (1962); Washington Park Handicap (1962); American Handicap (1962); Hollywood Gold Cup (1962)

Prove It (foaled June 2, 1957, in California) was an American Thoroughbred racehorse.

== Background ==
Prove It was a bay horse bred and raced by Rex Ellsworth and trained by Mish Tenney, he was sired by Endeavour, an Argentine-bred who also sired Corn Husker, Porterhouse and Pretense. Prove It was out of the mare Time To Khal, who was sired by Khaled, a multiple stakes winner in England for the Aga Khan III who was purchased by Ellsworth and brought to stand at his Chino, California, stud ranch. Khaled was the sire of U.S. Racing Hall of Fame inductee Swaps.

== Racing career ==
Prove It had a highly successful racing career that included wins in the prestigious Santa Anita Handicap (1961) and Hollywood Gold Cup (1962). He also set an Arlington Park track record in the 1962 Benjamin F. Lindheimer Handicap. Prove It was retired to stud, where his offspring met with modest success in racing. Through daughter Proof Requested, he was the damsire of 1983 Preakness Stakes winner Deputed Testamony.

== Stud record ==
Prove It's death date is uncertain as he is reported for have died in 1982, but his last offspring, Ladies Quote, was foaled in 1987. One of his notable offspring, Bargain Day, set the thoroughbred stallion sire standard for longevity at 37 years and 17 days early in the 21st century. Bargain Day was foaled on June 7, 1965, at Rex Ellsworth's Chino Ranch and died of natural causes in his sleep the night of June 24, 2002, becoming the longest lived known horse to have produced offspring.
