= 1963 Preakness Stakes =

88th running of the Preakness Stakes

88th Preakness Stakes
- The Preakness Stakes
- Location: Pimlico Race Course, Baltimore, Maryland, United States
- Date: May 18, 1963
- Distance: 1 3/16 miles
- Winning horse: Candy Spots
- Jockey: Bill Shoemaker
- Trainer: Mesh Tenney
- Owner: Rex C. Ellsworth
- Conditions: Fast
- Surface: Dirt

The 1963 Preakness Stakes was the 88th running of the $200,000 Preakness Stakes thoroughbred horse race. The race took place on May 18, 1963, and was televised in the United States on the CBS television network. Candy Spots, who was jockeyed by Bill Shoemaker, won the race by three and one half lengths over runner-up Chateaugay. Approximate post time was 5:48 p.m. Eastern Time. The race was run over a distance of a mile and one-sixteenth on a fast track in a final time of 1:56-1/5. The Maryland Jockey Club reported total attendance of 35,263, this is recorded as second highest on the list of American thoroughbred racing top attended events for North America in 1963.

== Payout ==
The 88th Preakness Stakes Payout Schedule

Program Number	Horse Name	Win	Place	Show
8	Candy Spots	$5.00	$3.20	$2.20
4	Chateaugay	-	$4.40	$2.40
5	Never Bend	-	-	$2.20

== The full chart ==
Finish Position	Margin (lengths)	Post Position	Horse name	Jockey	Trainer	Owner	Post Time Odds	Purse Earnings
1st	0	8	Candy Spots	Bill Shoemaker	Mesh Tenney	Rex C. Ellsworth	1.50-1 favorite	$127,500
2nd	3 1/2	4	Chateaugay	Braulio Baeza	James P. Conway	Darby Dan Farm	2.90-1	$30,000
3rd	8	5	Never Bend	Manuel Ycaza	Woody Stephens	Cain Hoy Stable	2.90-1	$15,000
4th	10 1/4	2	Lemon Twist	Sidney LeJeune	Peter C. Keiser	Theodore D. Buhl	22.80-1	$7,500
5th	10 1/2	6	Sky Wonder	Charles E. Burr	Budd I. Lepman	Mrs. Charles D. Morgan	37.10-1	
6th	11 1/4	7	Rural Retreat	Robert L. Baird	Gordon R. Potter	William B. Robinson	99.50-1	
7th	17 1/4	1	On My Honor	Paul Frey	James D. Jordan	Mike & Jack Stein	34.50-1	
8th	20 1/4	3	Country Squire	Wayne Chambers	Robert N. Blackburn	Jacnot Stable (Jack R. Hogan)	22.30-1	

- Winning Breeder: Rex C. Ellsworth; (KY)
- Winning Time: 1:56 1/5
- Track Condition: Fast
- Total Attendance: 35,263
