= Deputed Testamony =

American-bred Thoroughbred racehorse

- Sire: Traffic Cop
- Grandsire: Traffic Judge
- Dam: Proof Requested
- Damsire: Prove It
- Sex: Stallion
- Foaled: 1980
- Country: United States
- Colour: Bay
- Breeder: J. William Boniface & Francis P. Sears
- Owner: Bonita Farm & Francis P. Sears
- Trainer: J. William Boniface
- Record: 20: 11-3-0
- Earnings: US$674,329

Major wins
- Play The Palace Stakes (1982); Keystone Stakes (1983); Federico Tesio Stakes (1983); Governor's Cup Handicap (1983); Haskell Invitational Handicap (1983); City of Baltimore Handicap (1984) Triple Crown Race wins: Preakness Stakes (1983)

Honours
- Deputed Testamony Stakes at Laurel Park

Deputed Testamony (May 7, 1980 – September 18, 2012) was an American Thoroughbred racehorse best known for winning the Preakness Stakes. Deputed Testamony is the last of eight Maryland-breds to win the Preakness Stakes and is one of only eleven colts from the state to win a Triple Crown race. Upon the death of Danzig Connection in 2010, he became the last living thoroughbred to win a Triple Crown race during the decade of the 1980s. Deputed Testamony died on September 18, 2012, aged 32.

== Background ==
Bred and raced by Bonita Farm and Francis P. Sears, Deputed Testamony was trained by J. William Boniface of Bonita Farm. His sire was Traffic Cop and his dam was Proof Requested. Damsire Prove It was a multiple stakes winner whose victories included the prestigious Santa Anita Handicap (1961) and Hollywood Gold Cup (1962).

== Early racing career ==
The colt made seven starts at age two, notably winning the one mile Play The Palace Stakes at the Meadowlands Racetrack in track record time. In his three-year-old season, Deputed Testamony did not run in the Kentucky Derby. Leading up to his win in the Preakness Stakes, the second leg U.S. Triple Crown series, he won the Keystone Stakes at Pennsylvania's Keystone Racetrack and the Federico Tesio Stakes at Pimlico Race Course in Baltimore, Maryland.

== Later racing career ==
After defeating Kentucky Derby winner Sunny's Halo in the Preakness at Pimlico, Deputed Testamony finished sixth to winner Caveat in the third leg of the Triple Crown: the Belmont Stakes at Elmont, New York. Racing at Bowie Race Track in Maryland, the colt won the Governor's Cup Handicap and scored his second Grade I win of the year in the Haskell Invitational Handicap at Monmouth Park Racetrack in New Jersey.

At age four in 1984, Deputed Testamony returned to race two more times, winning both starts. In his second win, at Pimlico Race Course, he set the second track record of his career in the 1^{1}/16 mile City of Baltimore Handicap but came out of it with an injury that ended his racing career.

According to Boniface, his trainer, Deputed Testamony never raced on any kind of medication during his career. The contrast between his "hay, oats, and water" regimen and a controversy involving other horses in the 1983 Preakness (where some out-of-state trainers sued to be allowed to race their horses on Lasix, which was banned in Maryland at the time) was the subject of a feature article in Sports Illustrated following his victory.

The Deputed Testamony Stakes, held in February at Laurel Park Racecourse in Laurel, Maryland, since 1985, is named after him.

== As a sire ==
Syndicated and retired to stud at his Bonita Farm, Deputed Testamony sired progeny that met with modest racing success. However, he is the damsire of:

- Whitmore's Conn - won the Grade I Sword Dancer (2003) and had back-to-back wins in the Grade III Bowling Green Handicap (2002–2003).
- Bellamy Road - George Steinbrenner's winner of the Grade I Wood Memorial Stakes (2005)

In 2004, Deputed Testamony was pensioned at Bonita Farm.

== Breeding ==
Pedigree of Deputed Testamony
Sire Traffic Cop bay 1969	Traffic Judge ch. 1952	Alibhai	Hyperion*
Sire Traffic Cop bay 1969	Traffic Judge ch. 1952	Alibhai	Teresina
Sire Traffic Cop bay 1969	Traffic Judge ch. 1952	Traffic Court	Discovery
Sire Traffic Cop bay 1969	Traffic Judge ch. 1952	Traffic Court	Traffic
Sire Traffic Cop bay 1969	Flight Birdbay 1953	Count Fleet	Reigh Count
Sire Traffic Cop bay 1969	Flight Birdbay 1953	Count Fleet	Quickly
Sire Traffic Cop bay 1969	Flight Birdbay 1953	Pocket Edition	Roman
Sire Traffic Cop bay 1969	Flight Birdbay 1953	Pocket Edition	Never Again
Dam Proof Requested bay 1968	Prove It bay 1957	Endeavour	British Empire
Dam Proof Requested bay 1968	Prove It bay 1957	Endeavour	Himalaya
Dam Proof Requested bay 1968	Prove It bay 1957	Time to Khal	Khaled*
Dam Proof Requested bay 1968	Prove It bay 1957	Time to Khal	Feather Time
Dam Proof Requested bay 1968	Come On bay 1951	Requested	Questionnaire
Dam Proof Requested bay 1968	Come On bay 1951	Requested	Fair Perdita
Dam Proof Requested bay 1968	Come On bay 1951	Dog Blessed	Bull Dog
Dam Proof Requested bay 1968	Come On bay 1951	Dog Blessed	Blessed Again

* Deputed Testamony is inbred 4S x 5D to the stallion Hyperion, meaning that he appears fourth generation on the sire side of his pedigree, and fifth generation (via Khaled) on the dam side of his pedigree.

== See also ==
- Deputed Testamony's pedigree and partial racing stats
- Deputed Testamony's official story at Bonita Farm
