= 1955 Kentucky Derby =

Horse race

81st Kentucky Derby
- Kentucky Derby
- Grade I stakes race
- Location: Churchill Downs
- Date: May 7, 1955
- Distance: 1 1/4 miles
- Winning horse: Swaps
- Winning time: 2:01 4/5
- Final odds: 2.80-1
- Jockey: Bill Shoemaker
- Trainer: Mesh Tenney
- Owner: Rex C. Ellsworth
- Conditions: Three-year-olds
- Surface: Dirt

The 1955 Kentucky Derby was the 81st running of the Kentucky Derby. The race took place on May 7, 1955. The race carried a purse of $152,500 of which winner Swaps received $108,400, a then record.

== Winner of the Kentucky Derby ==
Swaps was a California bred American thoroughbred racehorse. Swap's became the first "All-California" colt to win the Kentucky Derby. Known as the "California Comet", this not being the only nickname he had many other nicknames. His second most popular one was the "California Cripple." This name was given because of how many injuries he had and still ended up winning the Kentucky Derby.

== Trainer of Swaps ==
Swaps was trained by Meshach (Mesh) Tenney. Tenney was born on November 16, 1907, and worked with Swaps. Swaps then ended up winning the title of United States Horse of the Year in 1956 with the assistance of Mesh Tenney. Mesh Tenney was known for the night before the 1955 Kentucky Derby because he slept in Swap's stall.

== Race description ==
The 2-year-old champion (Nashua) and Swaps were some of the biggest competitors and "brought one of the biggest East-West showdowns in Derby history." (Courier Journal) Swaps established a steady pace for the beginning of the race, Eddie Arcaro and Nashua started to stalk in the third and moved on the outside of Swaps. Swaps ended up speeding up and winning by 1 1/2 lengths. Swaps covered the last-quarter mile with the time of 49 2/5 seconds.

== Full results ==
- 1955 Kentucky Derby Charts

Finished	Post	Horse	Jockey	Trainer	Owner	Time / behind (lengths)
1st	7	Swaps	Bill Shoemaker	Mesh Tenney	Rex C. Ellsworth	2:01 4/5
2nd	5	Nashua	Eddie Arcaro	James E. Fitzsimmons	Belair Stud	1 1/2
3rd	9	Summer Tan	Eric Guerin	Sherrill W. Ward	Dorothy Bryan Firestone Galbreath	6 1/2
4th	1A	Racing Fool	Henry Moreno	Loyd Gentry Jr.	Cain Hoy Stable	4
5th	8	Jean's Joe	Steve Brooks	William B. Finnegan	Murcain Stable	1/2
6th	1	Flying Fury	Conn McCreary	Loyd Gentry, Jr.	Cain Hoy Stable	1 1/2
7th	4	Honeys Alibi	William Harmatz	Joe Inzelone	W-L Ranch Co.	3/4
8th	2	Blue Lem	Chris Rogers	Harvey C. Fruehauf	Harvey C. Fruehauf	3 1/2
9th	3	Nabesna	John H. Adams	John W. Clark	Clifford Mooers	1 1/2
10th	6	Trim Destiny	Lois C. Cook	Cecil Locklear	G. Rollie White	10

== Payouts ==
$2.00 wager returns $7.60 profit, therefore $5.60 profit.

The win, place and show payoffs are based on a $2.00 bet.

== Extra information ==
- Winning Breeder: Rex C. Ellsworth; (CA)
- Track rating: Fast
