= Terrang =

American-bred Thoroughbred racehorse

- Sire: Khaled
- Grandsire: Hyperion
- Dam: Flying Choice
- Damsire: Flying Heels
- Sex: Stallion
- Foaled: 1953
- Country: United States
- Colour: Brown
- Breeder: Rex C. Ellsworth
- Owner: 1) Rex C. Ellsworth; 2) Poltex Stable & Roland Bond
- Trainer: 1) Mesh Tenney; 2) Carl Roles (from January 1957)
- Record: 66: 15-9-12
- Earnings: US$599,285

Major wins
- Santa Anita Derby (1956); Will Rogers Stakes (1956); San Vicente Handicap (1956); Argonaut Handicap (1957); San Antonio Handicap (1957); San Bernardino Handicap (1958, 1959); San Pasqual Handicap (1958); Santa Catalina Handicap (1958, 1959); Santa Anita Handicap (1959)

Terrang (foaled 1953 in California) was an American Thoroughbred racehorse who in the 1950s won a record ten stakes races at Santa Anita Park including the Santa Anita Derby and Santa Anita Handicap.

== Background ==
Bred by Rex Ellsworth, Terrang's dam was Flying Choice, a daughter of the runner Flying Heels whose sire was the 1925 Kentucky Derby winner, Flying Ebony. His British-born sire Khaled was a winner of England's Coventry, Middle Park, and St. James's Palace Stakes. Imported to the United States by Ellsworth, Khaled was a stallion who also sired U.S. Racing Hall of Fame inductee, Swaps.

== Racing career ==
Rex Ellsworth raced Terrang at age three in 1956. Under trainer Mesh Tenney, the colt won the most important race for three-year-olds on the West Coast, the Santa Anita Derby. Ridden by regular jockey Bill Shoemaker, he then finished twelfth in the Kentucky Derby and for the rest of the year showed little of his old form. On January 18, 1957, Ellsworth sold Terrang to Texan's Roland Bond and Lawrence S. Pollock, the latter using the nom de course, Poltex Stable. For his new owners, Terrang's race conditioning was handled by Carl Roles who got him back into top shape and guided him to great success over the next three years. Among those successes, in 1957 Terrang set a new Santa Anita track record for a mile and an eight in winning the San Antonio Handicap plus capped off his racing career at age six in 1959 with a win in the prestigious Santa Anita Handicap.

== Stud record ==
Retired to stud duty having won twelve stakes races in all, Terrang sired several good stakes race winners including the 1970 Santa Anita Derby winner, Terlago.
