= Olden Times =

American-bred Thoroughbred racehorse

- Sire: Relic
- Grandsire: War Relic
- Dam: Djenne
- Damsire: Djebel
- Sex: Stallion
- Foaled: 1958
- Country: United States
- Colour: Bay
- Breeder: Rex C. Ellsworth
- Owner: Rex C. Ellsworth
- Trainer: Mesh Tenney
- Record: 54: 17-10-5
- Earnings: US$603,875

Major wins
- Charles S. Howard Stakes (1960); Haggin Stakes (1960); Malibu Stakes (1961); Debonair Stakes (1961); California Breeders' 3yo Champion Stakes (1961); San Juan Capistrano Handicap (1962); San Antonio Handicap (1962); Golden State Breeders' Handicap (1962); San Pasqual Handicap (1963, 1964); Metropolitan Handicap (1964); Illinois Handicap (1964); Churchill Downs Handicap (1964)

Olden Times (1958–1985) was an American Thoroughbred racehorse.

== Background ==
Olden Times was conceived in France and bred in California and was raced by Rex Ellsworth, who also bred and raced U.S. Racing Hall of Fame inductee Swaps. He was conditioned for racing by Hall of Fame trainer Mesh Tenney from a base in California. Ridden by Hank Moreno,

== Racing career ==
Olden Times won top races on both dirt and grass at racetracks across the United States from 1960 through 1964 at distances from five eighths of a mile to a mile and three quarters. He was sired by Relic, an American multiple stakes race winner who became the leading broodmare sire in France in 1965. Olden Times' dam was Djenne, a daughter of 1942 Prix de l'Arc de Triomphe winner and five-time Leading sire in France Djebel.

On 30 April 1964 Olden Times captured the Churchill Downs Handicap by 2 3/4 lengths in a time of 1:21 2/5 setting a new track record for the seven furlong distance.

Olden Times capped off his career with a 1964 win over Belmont Stakes winner Quadrangle in the prestigious Metropolitan Handicap at Aqueduct Racetrack in Queens, New York.

== Stud record ==
Retired to stud duty for the 1965 breeding season, Olden Times was a successful sire. The best of his progeny was Roving Boy, voted the 1982 Eclipse Award as the American Champion Two-Year-Old Colt. A winner of five of his seven starts in 1982, Roving Boy earned $800,425 that year, at the time the highest ever for his age group. Among Olden Times' other successful offspring were multiple stakes winners Full Pocket (f. 1969), Blue Times (f. 1971), Dainty Dotsie (f. 1974), Dr. Riddick (f. 1974), and Vittorioso (f. 1979).

== Pedigree ==
Pedigree of Olden Times
| Sire Relic | War Relic | Man o' War | Fair Play |
| Sire Relic | War Relic | Man o' War | Mahubah |
| Sire Relic | War Relic | Friars Carse | Friar Rock |
| Sire Relic | War Relic | Friars Carse | Problem |
| Sire Relic | Bridal Colors | Black Toney | Peter Pan |
| Sire Relic | Bridal Colors | Black Toney | Belgravia |
| Sire Relic | Bridal Colors | Vaila | Fariman |
| Sire Relic | Bridal Colors | Vaila | Padilla |
| Dam Djenne | Djebel | Tourbillon | Ksar |
| Dam Djenne | Djebel | Tourbillon | Durban |
| Dam Djenne | Djebel | Loika | Gay Crusader |
| Dam Djenne | Djebel | Loika | Coeur A Coeur |
| Dam Djenne | Teza | Jock | Asterus |
| Dam Djenne | Teza | Jock | Naic |
| Dam Djenne | Teza | Torissima | Tourbillon |
| Dam Djenne | Teza | Torissima | Carissima |
