= 1955 Preakness Stakes =

80th running of the Preakness Stakes

80th Preakness Stakes
- The Preakness Stakes
- Location: Pimlico Race Course, Baltimore, Maryland, United States
- Date: May 28, 1955
- Winning horse: Nashua
- Jockey: Eddie Arcaro
- Trainer: James E. Fitzsimmons
- Conditions: Three-year olds
- Surface: Dirt

The 1955 Preakness Stakes was the 80th Preakness Stakes overall and it was held on May 28, 1955, at the Pimlico Race Course in Baltimore, Maryland. Nashua, ridden by Eddie Arcaro and trained by James E. Fitzsimmons won the race, outrunning Saratoga who finished second. Traffic Judge, who was trained by Woody Stephens finished third.

Nashua's winning time of 1:54 3/5 for the mile and three-sixteenth race on dirt broke the Pimlico track record.

== Background ==
Going into the race, Nashua was the favorite despite coming off a loss to Swaps in the 1955 Kentucky Derby. Saratoga was the second favorite and had previously lost to Nashua prior to the Preakness.

== Results ==
The chart below is the results of the 1955 Preakness Stakes.

Finish Position	Margin (lengths)	Post Position	Horse name	Jockey	Trainer	Owner	Odds	Earnings
1st		5	Nashua	Eddie Arcaro	James E. Fitzsimmons	Wheatley Stable	1-2	$67,550
2nd	1	4	Saratoga	Nick Shuk	Frank A. Bonsal	Montpelier Stable	5-1	
3rd	7	1	Traffic Judge	Eric Guerin	Woody Stephens	Walnut Springs Farm (Clifford Mooers)	6-1	
4th	nk	8	Nance's Lad	John Choquette	Hilton A. Dabson	Everglades Farm (H. A. Dabson & Chester J. Caithness)	12-1	
5th	3	9	Honey's Alibi	Carlos Gonzalez	Joseph F. Inzelone	W-L Ranch Co.	8-1	
6th	3½	3	Fleet Path	Jimmy Lynch	Walter J. Susini	Duntreath Farm (Perne L. Grissom)	15-1	
7th	7	2	Sticks	Robert J. Martin	John C. Wozneski	B and G Stable (Frank A. Benner & Norman C. Galbraith)	50-1	
8th	4	7	Go Lightly	Joe Culmone	James McGee	Roslyn Stable (Gough W. Thompson)	30-1	

- Scratched: Chuck Thomson
- Winning Breeder: Belair Stud; (KY)
- Winning Time: 1:54 3/5 (new track record)
- Track Rating: Fast
- Total Attendance: 35,608
