= Lemhi Gold =

American-bred Thoroughbred racehorse

- Sire: Vaguely Noble
- Grandsire: Vienna
- Dam: Belle Marie
- Damsire: Candy Spots
- Sex: Stallion
- Foaled: 1978
- Country: United States
- Colour: Chestnut
- Breeder: Aaron & Marie Jones
- Owner: Aaron & Marie Jones
- Trainer: Laz Barrera
- Record: 22: 8-3-1
- Earnings: US$1,116,445

Major wins
- Westwood Stakes (1981); San Marino Handicap (1982); San Juan Capistrano Handicap (1982); Sword Dancer Handicap (1982); Marlboro Cup (1982); Jockey Club Gold Cup (1982)

Awards
- American Champion Older Male Horse (1982)

Honours
- Lemhi Gold Overnight at Hollywood Park

Lemhi Gold (foaled 1978 in Kentucky) was an American Thoroughbred Champion racehorse. In 1982, he was voted American Champion Older Male Horse at the Eclipse Awards after a season in which he won the Marlboro Cup and the Jockey Club Gold Cup.

== Background ==
Bred and raced by Eugene, Oregon, lumberman Aaron U. Jones and his wife, Marie, Lemhi Gold was sired by Prix de l'Arc de Triomphe winner Vaguely Noble, who also sired the superstar filly Dahlia. His dam, Belle Marie, was a daughter of 1963 Preakness Stakes winner Candy Spots.

The colt was named by Aaron Jones for an old gold mining site at Lemhi Creek in Idaho where he owned a cabin retreat. Trained by U.S. Racing Hall of Fame inductee Laz Barrera, Lemhi Gold did not race at age two in 1980.

== Racing career ==
In 1981, the three-year-old suffered a shin injury on March 26 in his second start. That injury eliminated any chance he may have had to compete in U.S. Triple Crown series. Lemhi Gold made a return to racing on July 9 with a fourteen-length win on turf in a division of the Westwood Stakes at Hollywood Park Racetrack in California. On August 2, he finished second by a neck in the Jim Dandy Stakes on dirt at Saratoga Race Course in New York and then a few weeks later finished ninth in the Jerome Handicap at Belmont Park after injuring his back in the starting gate. This second injury of 1981 meant that Lemhi Gold did not race again until 1982.

== 1982 Championship Season ==
Racing at age four in 1982, Lemhi Gold demonstrated an ability to win at longer distances and on either turf or dirt. By the end of May, he had earned his fourth win in four career starts on turf, including victories in the 1982 San Marino and San Juan Capistrano Handicaps by a combined twelve lengths. In July, he won the Sword Dancer Handicap on turf, and in August ran fourth to winner Perrault on the grass at Chicago's Arlington Park in the Arlington Million. In September, Lemhi Gold was sent to run on the dirt at Belmont Park in the Marlboro Cup where he beat the heavily favored Timely Writer by 8¾ lengths. In October, he won again on dirt, capturing the 1½ mile Jockey Club Gold Cup by 4½ lengths. At the end of October, in his final race of 1982, Lemhi Gold ran fifth on the grass to winner John Henry in the Oak Tree Invitational Stakes at Santa Anita Park.

Lemhi Gold was voted the Eclipse Award as the American Champion Older Male Horse of 1982. In the closest vote since the Eclipse Awards were created in 1971, he finished second in the American Horse of the Year balloting to Conquistador Cielo.

== 1983 European Racing ==
During the latter part of 1982, owner Aaron Jones was negotiating a syndication deal for Lemhi Gold to stand at stud. Reported to be for as much as US$28 million, the deal never materialized and on December 15, 1982, the Los Angeles Times reported that Lemhi Gold would be shipped to France for a 1983 campaign on the grass courses in Europe to culminate in October with a run in the most prestigious European event, the Prix de l'Arc de Triomphe.

On May 29, 1983, Lemhi Gold made his European racing debut, finishing last in a seven-horse field in the Prix Dollar at Longchamp Racecourse in Paris. In his next start on July 3 at Saint-Cloud Racecourse, he ran fourth in the Grand Prix de Saint-Cloud to American Paul Mellon's winning colt Diamond Shoal, who was ridden by American Steve Cauthen. He was then sent to England to run in the July 23 King George VI and Queen Elizabeth Diamond Stakes at Ascot Racecourse. After he finished eighth, he was retired from racing.

== At Stud ==
Lemhi Gold returned to the United States to stand at stud at Gainesway Farm in Lexington, Kentucky. In 1990, he was sent to breeders in West Germany and around 1997 to Croatia. The progeny of Lemhi Gold met with modest success in racing. Probably his best runner was the American filly Lemhi Go (b. 1988), who won the La Prevoyante Handicap and Arlington Matron Handicap.

== Pedigree ==
Pedigree of Lemhi Gold
Sire Vaguely Noble	Vienna	Aureole	Hyperion*
Sire Vaguely Noble	Vienna	Aureole	Angelola
Sire Vaguely Noble	Vienna	Turkish Blood	Turkhan
Sire Vaguely Noble	Vienna	Turkish Blood	Rusk
Sire Vaguely Noble	Noble Lassie	Nearco	Pharos
Sire Vaguely Noble	Noble Lassie	Nearco	Nogara
Sire Vaguely Noble	Noble Lassie	Belle Sauvage	Big Game
Sire Vaguely Noble	Noble Lassie	Belle Sauvage	Tropical Sun*
Dam Belle Marie	Candy Spots	Nigromante	Embrujo
Dam Belle Marie	Candy Spots	Nigromante	Niguá
Dam Belle Marie	Candy Spots	Candy Dish	Khaled*
Dam Belle Marie	Candy Spots	Candy Dish	Feather Time
Dam Belle Marie	French Gal	Our Colonel	Ky Colonel
Dam Belle Marie	French Gal	Our Colonel	Roman Grace
Dam Belle Marie	French Gal	Mademoiselle d'Or	Denturius
Dam Belle Marie	French Gal	Mademoiselle d'Or	Orum Star

* Lemhi Gold is inbred 4S x 5S x 5D to the stallion Hyperion, meaning that he appears fourth generation and fifth generation (via Tropical Sun) on the sire side of his pedigree, and fifth generation (via Khaled) on the dam side of his pedigree.
