= Wind and Wuthering =

Wind and Wuthering may refer to:

- Wind & Wuthering, a 1976 album by Genesis
- Wind and Wuthering (horse), a Thoroughbred racehorse
