= Nashua (horse) =

American-bred Thoroughbred racehorse

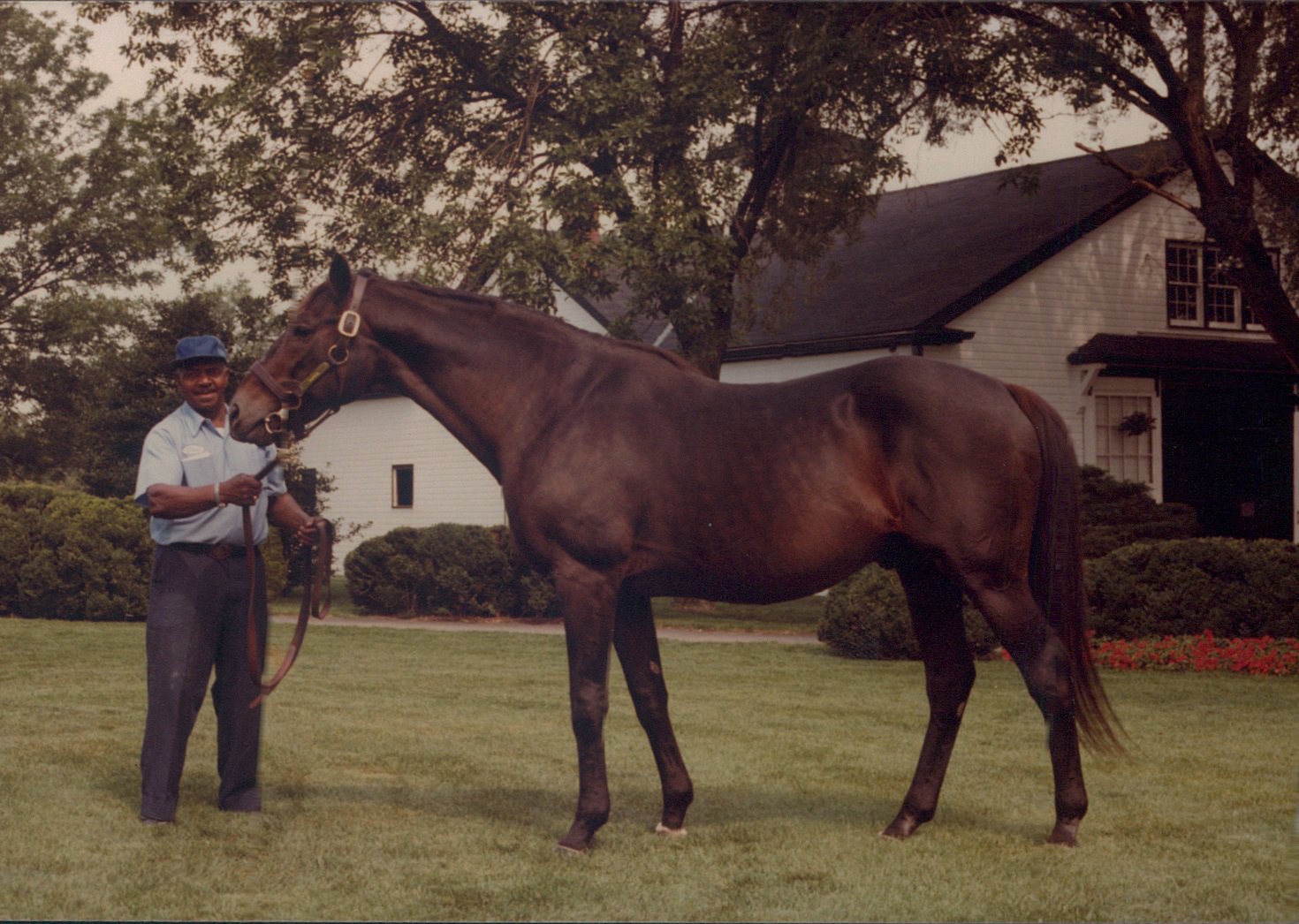
- Nashua & Clem Brooks at Spendthrift Farm in 1981
- Sire: Nasrullah
- Grandsire: Nearco
- Dam: Segula
- Damsire: Johnstown
- Sex: Stallion
- Foaled: 1952
- Country: United States
- Color: Bay
- Breeder: Belair Stud
- Owner: Belair Stud; Racing silks: White, red dots, red cap.
- Trainer: Sunny Jim Fitzsimmons
- Record: 30: 22–4–1
- Earnings: $1,288,565

Major wins
- Futurity Stakes (1954); Hopeful Stakes (1954); Grand Union Hotel Stakes (1954); Juvenile Stakes (1954); Flamingo Stakes (1955); Florida Derby (1955); Arlington Classic (1955); Wood Memorial Stakes (1955); Dwyer Stakes (1955); Jockey Club Gold Cup (1955, 1956); Grey Lag Handicap (1956); Monmouth Handicap (1956); Suburban Handicap (1956); Widener Handicap (1956) American Classic Race wins: Preakness Stakes (1955); Belmont Stakes (1955)

Awards
- U.S. Champion 2-Year-Old Colt (1954); U.S. Champion 3-Year-Old Colt (1955); United States Horse of the Year (1955)

Honors
- United States Racing Hall of Fame (1965) #24 - Top 100 U.S. Racehorses of the 20th Century; Nashua Stakes at Aqueduct Racetrack
- Last updated on August 14, 2021

Nashua (April 14, 1952 – February 3, 1982) was an American-born thoroughbred racehorse, bred in Kentucky and best remembered for a 1955 match race against Swaps, the horse that had defeated him in the Kentucky Derby.

== Background ==
Nashua's sire was the European champion Nasrullah. The dam was Segula, a broodmare who has had influence through her female descendants.

== Racing career ==
Owned by William Woodward Jr.'s famous Belair Stud in Bowie, Maryland, Nashua was trained by Sunny Jim Fitzsimmons and ridden by jockey Eddie Arcaro. As a two-year-old in 1954, Nashua entered eight races, winning six and finishing second twice, which earned him champion 2-year-old honors. The following year he earned United States Horse of the Year awards from the Thoroughbred Racing Association (with 21 of the 40 votes), and the publishers of Daily Racing Form.

=== U.S. Triple Crown series ===
Nashua was the betting favorite to win the 1955 Kentucky Derby but was beaten by the second choice, Swaps.

In the 1955 Preakness Stakes, second leg of the Triple Crown, Swaps did not run and Nashua won by a length over a surprisingly strong challenge by Marion duPont Scott's colt, Saratoga. Nashua's time of 1:54 3/5 for the mile and three-sixteenth race on dirt broke the Pimlico track record.

Swaps did not run in the Belmont Stakes and Nashua, the overwhelming choice of the bettors, romped home nine lengths ahead of his nearest rival Blazing Count with Porterville another five and on-half behind them.

In what would become Nashua's most famous race, he defeated Swaps in an August 31, 1955 match race at Chicago's Washington Park Race Track.

Nashua would be voted the 1955 American Horse of the Year and American Champion Three-Year-Old Male Horse after winning 10 of his 12 starts.

== New owners ==
Following the shooting death of William Woodward Jr., the Belair Stud horses were auctioned off. In 1955, a syndicate purchased Nashua for a record $1,251,200 from the Woodward estate, with majority interests owned by Christopher J. Devine (senior partner and founder of C.J. Devine & Co.); Leslie Combs II; and John Wesley Hanes II, an Under Secretary of the Treasury in the Franklin D. Roosevelt Administration, the head of the New York Racing Association and a part owner in the company that made Hanes hosiery and underwear. In 1956 the syndicate leased Nashua to Combs to race under the Combs colors.

== Retirement ==
At the end of his 1956 season, after thirty career races with a record of 22–4–1, Nashua was retired to stand at stud at Spendthrift Farm in Lexington, Kentucky. He retired as only the second horse to earn more than $1 million. His earnings of $1,288,565 surpassed the great Citation's record and stood as the earnings mark until surpassed by Round Table in the autumn of 1958.

At stud, Nashua was consistent, though his fillies were usually better runners than his colts. His progeny included the Hall of Fame racemare Shuvee, Bramalea (the dam of Roberto), Gold Digger (the dam of Mr. Prospector), and Melbourne Cup winner Beldale Ball.

In 1965, Nashua was inducted into the National Museum of Racing and Hall of Fame. In The Blood-Horse ranking of the top 100 U.S. thoroughbred champions of the 20th Century, he was ranked 24.

Nashua died in 1982 and is buried at Spendthrift Farm. In the mid-eighties, the farm commissioned a statue to be raised over him. The sculptor was Liza Todd, the daughter of Mike Todd and Elizabeth Taylor.

In 2010, sportswriter Bill Christine wrote that Nashua "...belongs on that short list of best horses never to have won the Kentucky Derby".

== Pedigree ==
Pedigree of Nashua
Sire Nasrullah b. 1940	Nearco b. 1935	Pharos	Phalaris
Sire Nasrullah b. 1940	Nearco b. 1935	Pharos	Scapa Flow
Sire Nasrullah b. 1940	Nearco b. 1935	Nogara	Havresac
Sire Nasrullah b. 1940	Nearco b. 1935	Nogara	Catnip
Sire Nasrullah b. 1940	Mumtaz Begum b. 1932	Blenheim	Blandford
Sire Nasrullah b. 1940	Mumtaz Begum b. 1932	Blenheim	Malva
Sire Nasrullah b. 1940	Mumtaz Begum b. 1932	Mumtaz Mahal	The Tetrarch
Sire Nasrullah b. 1940	Mumtaz Begum b. 1932	Mumtaz Mahal	Lady Josephine
Dam Segula b. 1942	Johnstown b. 1936	Jamestown	St. James
Dam Segula b. 1942	Johnstown b. 1936	Jamestown	Mlle. Dazie
Dam Segula b. 1942	Johnstown b. 1936	La France	Sir Gallahad III
Dam Segula b. 1942	Johnstown b. 1936	La France	Flambette
Dam Segula b. 1942	Sekhmet b. 1929	Sardanapale	Prestige
Dam Segula b. 1942	Sekhmet b. 1929	Sardanapale	Gemma
Dam Segula b. 1942	Sekhmet b. 1929	Prosopopee	Sans Souci
Dam Segula b. 1942	Sekhmet b. 1929	Prosopopee	Peroraison
