= New Policy =

American-bred Thoroughbred racehorse

- Sire: Khaled
- Grandsire: Hyperion
- Dam: Feu Follet
- Damsire: Fair Trial
- Sex: Stallion
- Foaled: February 11, 1957
- Country: United States
- Breeder: Mr. & Mrs. Lynn Boice (CA)
- Owner: Ralph Lowe
- Trainer: John H. Adams
- Jockey: Bill Shoemaker; Ismael Valenzuela
- Record: 45:13-10-2
- Earnings: $273,450

Major wins
- Cinema Handicap (1960); California Breeders' Champion Stakes (1960); San Miguel Stakes (1960); San Bernardino Handicap (1961); San Pasqual Handicap (1961); San Diego Handicap (1961); Santa Catalina Handicap (1962)

New Policy (born 1957) was an American Thoroughbred racehorse sired by Khaled and trained by John H. Adams shortly after his retirement as a jockey.

He was the grandsire of Town Policy (1975–1984) by Reb's Policy (b. 1967).

== Sire line tree ==
- New Policy
  - Reb's Policy
    - Town Policy
