= San Pasqual Handicap =

San Pasqual Stakes
- Class: Grade II
- Location: Santa Anita Park; Arcadia, California
- Inaugurated: 1935
- Race type: Thoroughbred – Flat racing
- Website: www.santaanita.com

Race information
- Distance: 1 1/8 miles (9 furlongs)
- Surface: Dirt
- Track: left-handed
- Qualification: Four years old and up
- Weight: 124 lbs with allowances
- Purse: US$200,000 (since 2014)

The San Pasqual Stakes is an American Thoroughbred horse race run annually during late January or early February at Santa Anita Park in Arcadia, California. The Grade II event is open to horses, age four and up, willing to race one and one-eighth miles (9 furlongs) on dirt and currently offers a purse of $200,000. Since 2011, it is run under allowance weight conditions but was previously run as a handicap.

Inaugurated in 1935, the San Pasqual Handicap was a race limited to three-year-olds until 1939 when it was changed to its present condition. Since inception, it has been contested at various distances:

- 6 furlongs : 1935–1936
- 7 furlongs : 1938
- 1 1/16 miles (8.5 furlongs) : 1937, 1942–1954, 1956–2017
- 1 1/8 miles (9 furlongs) : 1939–1941, 2018–present
- 1 1/4 miles (10 furlongs) : 1955 (on turf)

== Records ==
Speed record:

- 1:46.95 – Battle of Midway (2019) – at distance of 1 1/8 miles
- 1:39.58 – Zappa (2008) – at distance of 1 1/16 miles

Most wins:

- 2 – Moonrush (1951, 1953)
- 2 – Olden Times (1963, 1964)
- 2 – Kings Favor (1968, 1969)
- 2 – Express Train (2021, 2022)
- 2 – Newgrange (2023, 2024)

Most wins by a jockey:

- 8 – Bill Shoemaker (1955, 1959, 1963, 1964, 1965, 1967, 1971, 1974)

Most wins by a trainer:

- 5 – Bob Baffert (1999, 2002, 2003, 2013, 2015)
- 5 - John Shirreffs (2010, 2020, 2021, 2022, 2026)

Most wins by an owner:

- 4 – C R K Stable (2020, 2021, 2022, 2026)

== Winners ==
Year	Winner	Age	Jockey	Trainer	Owner	Time
2026	Westwood	4	Kazushi Kimura	John A. Shirreffs	C R K Stable	1:50.52
2025	Katonah	5	Tiago Josue Pereira	Doug O'Neill	R3 Racing LLC	1:51.36
2024	Newgrange	5	Victor Espinoza	Philip D'Amato	David Bernsen et al.	1:49.26
2023	Newgrange	4	Juan J. Hernandez	Philip D'Amato	David Bernsen et al.	1:49.97
2022	Express Train	5	Victor Espinoza	John Shirreffs	C R K Stable	1:50.99
2021	Express Train	4	Juan Hernandez	John Shirreffs	C R K Stable	1:52.13
2020	Midcourt	5	Victor Espinoza	John Shirreffs	C R K Stable	1:48.49
2019	Battle of Midway	5	Flavien Prat	Jerry Hollendorfer	Don Alberto Stable & Winstar Farm	1:46.95
2018	Accelerate	5	Victor Espinoza	John W. Sadler	Hronis Racing LLC	1:50.58
2017	Midnight Storm	5	Rafael Bajarano	Philip D'Amato	A Venneri Racing/Little Red Feather Racing	1:40.65
2016	California Chrome	5	Victor Espinoza	Art Sherman	Perry Martin / Taylor Made Farms dba California Chrome LLC	1:43.39
2015	Hoppertunity	4	Martin Garcia	Bob Baffert	Watson/Pegram/Weitman	1:41.69
2014	Blueskiesnrainbows	5	Martin A. Pedroza	Jerry Hollendorfer	Bad Boy Racing/Whizway Farms	1:43.17
2013	Coil	5	Martin Garcia	Bob Baffert	Watson/Pegram/Weitman	1:42.52
2012	Uh Oh Bango	5	Mike E. Smith	R. Kory Owens	Triple AAA Ranch	1:41.44
2011	Aggie Engineer	6	Joe Talamo	Patrick Gallagher	Mr. & Mrs. Ward Williford	1:40.94
2010	Neko Bay	7	Mike E. Smith	John Shirreffs	Jerry & Ann Moss	1:42.95
2009	Cowboy Cal	4	John Velazquez	Todd A. Pletcher	Robert & Janice McNair	1:41.26
2008	Zappa	6	Joel Rosario	John W. Sadler	Gary & Cecil Barber	1:39.58
2007	Dixie Meister	5	David R. Flores	Julio C. Canani	Gary A. Tanaka	1:43.18
2006	High Limit	4	Pat Valenzuela	Robert J. Frankel	Gary & Mary West Stable	1:43.64
2005	Congrats	5	Tyler Baze	Richard E. Mandella	Claiborne Farm & Adele Dilschneider	1:41.97
2004	Star Cross	7	Victor Espinoza	Darrell Vienna	E A Ranches	1:42.22
2003	Congaree	5	Jerry D. Bailey	Bob Baffert	Stonerside Stable	1:41.04
2002	Wooden Phone	5	David R. Flores	Bob Baffert	Derant, Helzer & Helzer	1:41.83
2001	Freedom Crest	5	Gary Stevens	Richard Baltas	Choi & Nguyan	1:41.94
2000	Dixie Dot Com	5	Pat Valenzuela	William Morey	Chaiken, Heller, Heller	1:40.95
1999	Silver Charm	5	Gary Stevens	Bob Baffert	Robert & Beverly Lewis	1:41.78
1998	Hal's Pal	5	Brice Blanc	Ben D. A. Cecil	Addison Racing, Ltd.	1:41.89
1997	Kingdom Found	7	Gary Stevens	Rafael Becerra	Dilbeck Family Trust	1:40.74
1996	Alphabet Soup	5	Chris Antley	David Hofmans	Ridder Thoroughbred Stable	1:41.66
1995	Del Mar Dennis	5	Alex Solis	J. Paco Gonzalez	Trudy McCaffery & John Toffan	1:41.23
1994	Hill Pass	5	Chris McCarron	Jack Van Berg	Brown, Ciaviglia, Shero et al.	1:41.00
1993	Jovial	6	Mickey Walls	Bruce L. Jackson	B. L. Jackson & John Swift	1:41.94
1992	Twilight Agenda	6	Kent Desormeaux	D. Wayne Lukas	Moyglare Stud	1:42.32
1991	Farma Way	4	Gary Stevens	D. Wayne Lukas	Quarter B Farm	1:40.80
1990	Criminal Type	5	Chris McCarron	D. Wayne Lukas	Calumet Farm	1:42.40
1989	On The Line	5	Gary Stevens	D. Wayne Lukas	Eugene V. Klein	1:41.00
1988	Super Diamond	8	Laffit Pincay Jr.	Edwin J. Gregson	Roland & Ramona Sahm	1:43.00
1987	Epidaurus	5	Gary Baze	Charles E. Whittingham	Howard B. Keck	1:42.40
1986	Precisionist	5	Chris McCarron	L. Ross Fenstermaker	Fred W. Hooper	1:41.20
1985	Hula Blaze	5	Pat Valenzuela	Noble Threewitt	RNH Racing Stable	1:42.00
1984	Danebo	5	Laffit Pincay Jr.	Laz Barrera	Aaron U. Jones	1:41.80
1983	Regal Falcon	5	Eddie Delahoussaye	Richard E. Mandella	Sarkosky-Wygod-Wyman	1:43.20
1982	Five Star Flight	4	Laffit Pincay Jr.	Benjamin W. Perkins Sr.	Willcox, Spencer et al.	1:40.80
1981	Flying Paster	5	Chris McCarron	Gordon C. Campbell	Bernard J. Ridder	1:41.20
1980	Valdez	4	Laffit Pincay Jr.	Laz Barrera	Aaron U. & Marie Jones	1:40.20
1979	Mr. Redoy	5	Ángel Cordero Jr.	A. Thomas Doyle	Felty J. Yoder	1:42.20
1978	Ancient Title	8	Darrel McHargue	Keith L. Stucki Sr.	Kirkland Stable	1:40.20
1977	Uniformity	5	Fernando Toro	Willard L. Proctor	Glen Hill Farm	1:41.00
1976	Lightning Mandate	5	Sandy Hawley	Gary F. Jones	Jones, McLeod et al.	1:48.40
1975	Okavango	5	Fernando Toro	David A. Whiteley	William Haggin Perry	1:41.40
1974	Tri Jet	5	Bill Shoemaker	Charles R. Parke	Fred W. Hooper	1:41.40
1973	Single Agent	5	Jerry Lambert	Wayne B. Stucki	Indian Hill Stable/Frank Marshall	1:41.80
1972	Western Welcome	5	Laffit Pincay Jr.	Junior W. Nicholson	M/M William R. Foy	1:41.20
1971	Ack Ack	5	Bill Shoemaker	Charles E. Whittingham	E. E. "Buddy" Fogelson	1:41.40
1970	Nodouble	5	Jorge Tejeira	J. Bert Sonnier	Verna Lea Farms	1:40.40
1969	Kings Favor	6	Jack Leonard	Darrell Cannon	Elttaes Farms	1:45.60
1968	Kings Favor	5	Johnny Sellers	Darrell Cannon	Elttaes Farms	1:44.20
1967	Pretense	4	Bill Shoemaker	Charles E. Whittingham	Llangollen Farm Stable	1:43.00
1966	Native Diver	7	Jerry Lambert	Buster Millerick	M/M Louis K. Shapiro	1:41.00
1965	Candy Spots	5	Bill Shoemaker	Mesh Tenney	Rex C. Ellsworth	1:42.20
1964	Olden Times	6	Bill Shoemaker	Mesh Tenney	Rex C. Ellsworth	1:44.40
1963	Olden Times	5	Bill Shoemaker	Mesh Tenney	Rex C. Ellsworth	1:42.20
1962	Micarlo	6	Angel Valenzuela	Farrell W. Jones	Elmendorf Farm	1:47.80
1961	New Policy	4	Ismael Valenzuela	John H. Adams	Ralph Lowe	1:41.60
1960	Fleet Nasrullah	5	John Longden	James I. Nazworthy	M/M. Ellwood B. Johnston	1:41.40
1959	Tempest II	5	Bill Shoemaker	William Molter	Maine Chance Farm	1:42.60
1958	Terrang	5	William Boland	Carl A. Roles	Poltex Stable & R. Bond	1:41.40
1957	Battle Dance	5	George Taniguchi	Joe Boyce	Jennilinda Stable	1:42.20
1956	Bobby Brocato	5	George Taniguchi	William Molter	M/M Travis M. Kerr	1:42.60
1955	Rejected	5	Bill Shoemaker	William J. Hirsch	King Ranch	2:04.60
1954	Phil D.	6	Merlin Volzke	T. M. Holt	M/M W. C. Martin	1:41.60
1953	Moonrush	7	Ralph Neves	Willie F. Alvarado	King & Luellwitz	1:43.40
1952	Be Fleet	5	Johnny Longden	William Molter	Andrew J. Crevolin	1:44.00
1951	Moonrush	5	Fred A. Smith	Willie F. Alvarado	King & Luellwitz	1:42.40
1950	Solidarity	5	Ralph Neves	Carl A. Roles	Mrs. Nat Goldstone	1:43.80
1949	Shim Malone	5	Ralph Neves	Maurice W. Breshnen	Rolling Hills Farm	1:45.60
1948	Olhaverry	9	Mel Peterson	Anthony E. Silver	Pan De Azucar Stable	1:44.00
1947	Lets Dance	5	John Gilbert	Joseph B. Rosen	Sunshine Stable	1:43.60
1946	Lou-Bre	5	Robert Permane	Bud Stotler	Charles S. Howard	1:42.40
1945	Thumbs Up	6	Johnny Longden	George M. Odom	Louis B. Mayer	1:44.60
1941	Mioland	4	Leon Haas	Tom Smith	Charles S. Howard	1:51.60
1940	Don Mike	6	Lester Balaski	Lindsay C. Howard	Binglin Farm	1:50.00
1939	Gosum	5	Alan Gray	Graceton Philpot	Nelson A. Howard	1:59.00
1938	Sun Egret	3	John H. Adams	H. Guy Bedwell	A. C. Compton	1:23.40
1937	Special Agent	5	Basil James	Darrell Cannon	Austin C. Taylor	1:42.80
1936	Proclivity	3	Tommy Luther	Edward L. Fitzgerald	Northway Stable	1:12.00
1935	Bluebeard	3	Harry Richards	Clyde Phillips	William R. Coe	1:12.80
