= Carl A. Roles =

American horse trainer

Carl Roles
Personal information
- Nickname: Slim
- Born: August 29, 1903 Virginia
- Died: January 15, 1970 (aged 66) Arcadia, California
- Resting place: Inglewood Park Cemetery, Inglewood, California
- Occupation: Trainer / Owner

Horse racing career
- Sport: Horse racing
- Career wins: Not found

Major racing wins
- Massachusetts Handicap (1936); San Vicente Stakes (1936); San Antonio Handicap (1936, 1957); Oceanside Stakes (1939); Havre de Grace Handicap (1943); Washington Park Handicap (1943); San Carlos Handicap (1946); Westerner Handicap (1948); Golden Gate Handicap (1949); Hollywood Gold Cup (1949); California Breeders' Champion Stakes (1950, 1968); Starlet Stakes (1950); San Pasqual Handicap (1950, 1958); Las Flores Handicap (1956); New York Handicap (1956); Argonaut Handicap (1957); San Bernardino Handicap (1958, 1959); San Luis Rey Handicap (1958); Santa Catalina Handicap (1958, 1959); Santa Margarita Handicap (1958); Santa Anita Handicap (1959); Del Mar Futurity (1963, 1964); Del Mar Handicap (1965); Hollywood Derby (1965); Roamer Handicap (1965); Del Mar Oaks (1966); Malibu Stakes (1966); Ramona Handicap (1966, 1967); Milady Handicap (1967); San Miguel Stakes (1969)

Significant horses
- Time Supply, Terrang, Desert Trial

Carlton A. Roles (August 29, 1903 – January 15, 1970) was an American Thoroughbred horse racing trainer who served for a time as the President of the California Thoroughbred Trainers Association.

Usually known as Carl Roles, he was sometimes referred to by the nickname, "Slim." A Thoroughbred trainer and owner, he trained for prominent stable owners such as Ada L. Rice of Chicago, Hollywood film studio boss, Louis B. Mayer and Milly Factor. In the 1930s he met with considerable success as the trainer of Time Supply for owner Frank A. Carreaud. The colt won a number of important races including the Massachusetts Handicap, San Antonio Handicap, San Vicente Handicap, and the Narragansett Special. However, Roles is best known as the trainer of Terrang whose race conditioning he took over in January 1957 after the horse was purchased by his clients, Roland Bond and Lawrence S. Pollock. In the summer of 1966, the owner of Desert Trial, Muriel Vanderbilt Adams, sent her horse west to trainer Carl Roles where he saddled him to a number of important stakes including back-to-back editions of the Ramona Handicap.

== Barbara Roles ==
Daughter, Barbara Roles, won the 1958 United States Junior Women's Figure Skating Championship and in 1962, the Senior Women's Championship. She was also the Bronze medallist in the 1960 Winter Olympics.

Carl Roles died at age sixty-six in 1970. At the time of his death, he was living in Pasadena, California.
