= Tommy Luther =

American jockey

Personal information
- Born: July 28, 1908 Millington, Illinois, USA
- Died: January 27, 2001 (aged 92) Saratoga Springs, New York, (USA)
- Occupation: Jockey

Horse racing career
- Sport: Horse racing

Major racing wins
- Coffroth Handicap (1928); Durham Cup Stakes (1933); Maple Leaf Stakes (1933); Bay Meadows Handicap (1934); Narragansett Special (1934); San Francisco Handicap (1934); Puritan Handicap (1935); Santa Barbara Handicap (1935); Yankee Handicap (1935); San Antonio Handicap (1936); San Pasqual Handicap (1936); San Vicente Stakes (1936); Rhode Island Handicap (1941); Capital Handicap (1945); Vosburgh Handicap (1945); Jerome Handicap (1945)

Significant horses
- Shady Well, Time Supply, Top Row

Thomas Jefferson Luther (July 28, 1908 – January 27, 2001) was an American Thoroughbred horse racing jockey.

== Riding career ==
In 1928 Tommy Luther won the then "World's Richest Race", the 100k Coffroth Handicap aboard Crystal Pennant at Agua Caliente Racetrack. He also won the first Narragansett Special in 1934 at Narragansett Park on Time Supply.

In 1934 Tommy Luther rode Top Row to a new world record for 1 1/16 miles on dirt in the San Francisco Handicap at the Bay Meadows Racetrack in San Mateo, California. Later that year at Havre de Grace, Maryland he rode Time Supply to a new track record for the Havre de Grace Racetrack.

Luther rode for 26 years and then trained horses for another 26 years.

== Honors ==
Tommy Luther helped establish the Jockeys' Guild and in 1991 was presented with a Founders' Pin by the then Guild president, Hall of Fame jockey Jerry Bailey.

In 2001, Saratoga Mountain Press of Saratoga Springs, New York published Jockeying For Change: Saratoga's Tommy Luther Kindling A Sense Of Humanity In The World Of Thoroughbred Racing written by Ron Farra.

Saratoga Race Course honored Tommy Luther with a 2004 opening day race in his name. The race was won by Right This Way who was ridden by Jose Espinoza for trainer Barclay Tagg.

In 2011, American racing fans formed the Tommy Luther History and Fan Club.

Tommy Luther was buried at Greenridge Cemetery in Saratoga Springs, New York.
