= Time Supply =

Thoroughbred racehorse

- Sire: Time Maker
- Grandsire: The Porter
- Dam: Surplice
- Damsire: Fair Play
- Sex: Stallion
- Foaled: 1931
- Country: United States
- Colour: Bay
- Breeder: Willis Sharpe Kilmer & Edward B. McLean
- Owner: Mrs. Frank A. Carreaud
- Trainer: Frank C. Travis; J. Netter; Carl A. Roles
- Record: 50: 18-6-7
- Earnings: $144,995

Major wins
- Bahamas Handicap (1934); Hialeah Stakes (1934); Narragansett Special (1934); Sacramento Handicap (1934); Bay Meadows Handicap (1934); Puritan Handicap (1935); What Cheer Handicap (1935); New England Handicap (1935); San Vicente Handicap (1936); San Antonio Handicap (1936); Massasoit Handicap (1936); Massachusetts Handicap (1936)

Time Supply (foaled 1931) was an American Thoroughbred racehorse sired by Time Maker out of the Fair Play mare Surplice. He was bred in Virginia at the Court Manor Stud of Willis Sharpe Kilmer in conjunction with Edward B. McLean. Kilmer had successfully run Sun Briar, Exterminator and Sun Beau which allowed him to expand his New York operations to Virginia. McLean was the publisher of The Washington Post and other newspapers through inheritance and had purchased the Hope Diamond in 1911. Still in June 1931, he dispersed his horse racing stock and Surplice with foal were bought by Mrs. Frank A. Carreaud. It proved to be a wise purchase.

At age 2, Time Supply won 3 of 5 races and showed some promise. He was entered in the Preakness Stakes of 1934 won by High Quest. Time Supply had forced the pace and faded to 6th place. By June he was winning a Claiming Stakes at Detroit Fairgrounds, but better things would come along.

In September, Time Supply ran 6 furlongs at Havre de Grace in 1:10 3/5 setting a track record. The next month he won the very first Narragansett Special at 1 mile 3/16 and which carried a $25,000 added purse. Jockey Tommy Luther followed the horse out west where he repeated his short to long pattern and won the 6 furlong Sacramento Handicap in the track record time of 1:10 1/5 at Bay Meadows. They then won the rich Bay Meadows Handicap at 1 mile and 1/8. He finished his 3 year old year with 8 wins and $61,430 in earnings. It was his best campaign.

Time Supply ran third in the very first Santa Anita Handicap. Afterwards in 1935, he paired up the What Cheer Handicap and New England Handicap at Narragansett Park. The later run in track record time of 1:49 3/5 for 9 furlongs. At age 5, he scored back to back victories in the San Vicente Handicap and San Antonio Handicap at Santa Anita Park. Again, the later in track record time of 1:49 2/5 for 1 mile and 1/8. He then ran 2nd in the 100k Big Cap to Top Row and saw his form tail off.

He paired up his last two stake wins at Suffolk Downs in the Massasoit Handicap, and then the $25k added Massachusetts Handicap with jockey Sonny Workman up.

Time Supply was retired after running 4 races without winning as a 7 year old. He stood at stud in California with limited success. Time Supply ran 50 times over six years with 18 wins (12 in stakes) and earnings of $144,995 during the middle of the Great Depression.
