= Ace Admiral =

American-bred Thoroughbred racehorse

- Sire: Heliopolis
- Grandsire: Hyperion
- Dam: War Flower
- Damsire: Man o' War
- Sex: Stallion
- Foaled: 1945
- Country: United States
- Colour: Chestnut
- Breeder: Mildred W. Woolwine
- Owner: Maine Chance Farm
- Trainer: James W. Smith (East Coast); William Molter (West Coast)
- Record: 39: 13-6-5
- Earnings: $270, 815

Major wins
- Lawrence Realization Stakes (1948); Travers Stakes (1948); Santa Anita Maturity (1949); Sunset Handicap (1949); Argonaut Handicap (1949); Inglewood Handicap (1949)

Ace Admiral (foaled in 1945) was an American Thoroughbred racehorse.

== Background ==
His sire, Heliopolis, was the leading sire in North America in 1950 and 1954. His grandsire, Hyperion, was a six-time leading sire in Great Britain & Ireland. His dam, War Flower, was a daughter of Man o' War.

== Racing career ==
Ace Admiral was born in the same year as the great Calumet Farm colts Citation and Coaltown. In his two-year-old season, Ace Admiral ran third to Citation in the Pimlico Futurity. Citation went on to dominate U.S. racing in 1947 and in the spring of 1948 leading up to the U.S. Triple Crown races. As such, like many other owners at the time, Maine Chance Farm felt it was in their best interest not to enter Ace Admiral in the Triple Crown races. Under trainer Jimmy Smith and jockey Ted Atkinson, Ace Admiral won a number of important races that year in New York, including the Lawrence Realization Stakes at Aqueduct Racetrack and the prestigious Travers Stakes at Saratoga Race Course.

Sent to compete in California in 1949, Ace Admiral was trained by William Molter. At Santa Anita Park, the four-year-old horse won the Santa Anita Maturity. At Hollywood Park Racetrack, he won the Sunset Handicap, Argonaut Handicap, and Inglewood Handicap.

== Breeding record ==
Ace Admiral was retired to stud at Spendthrift Farm in Lexington, Kentucky, where he sired:

- Ace Marine (1952 - Mazarine), Canadian Horse Racing Hall of Fame, Canadian Horse of the Year (1955), won the three races that four years later, in 1959, formally became the Canadian Triple Crown of Thoroughbred Racing
- Inside Tract (1954 - Mary Terry), won Jockey Club Gold Cup, 3rd Preakness Stakes, 2nd Belmont Stakes
- Frosty Admiral (1961 - Tickly Bender), Puerto Rico Horse of the Year and Puerto Rico Horse Racing Hall of Fame
