= Never Bend =

American-bred Thoroughbred racehorse

- Sire: Nasrullah
- Grandsire: Nearco
- Dam: Lalun
- Damsire: Djeddah
- Sex: Stallion
- Foaled: 1960
- Country: United States
- Color: Dark Bay
- Breeder: Harry F. Guggenheim
- Owner: Cain Hoy Stable
- Trainer: Woody Stephens
- Record: 23: 13-4-4
- Earnings: $641,524

Major wins
- Champagne Stakes (1962); Futurity Stakes (1962); Cowdin Stakes (1962); Flamingo Stakes (1963); Forerunner Stakes (1963); Stepping Stone Purse (1963); Yankee Handicap (1963)

Awards
- American Champion Two-Year-Old Colt (1962); Leading sire in GB & Ireland (1971)

Honors
- Never Bend Handicap at Pimlico Race Course

Never Bend (1960–1977) was a champion American Thoroughbred racehorse who was the 1962 American Champion Two-Year-Old and later became a leading sire in England.

== Racing career ==
=== 1962: Two-year-old season ===
Foaled at Claiborne Farm for owner/breeder Harry F. Guggenheim, Never Bend was the dominant two-year-old racing in the United States in 1962. His performances that year earned him the Eclipse Award for Outstanding Two-Year-Old Male Horse, and he was considered an early favorite for the ensuing 1963 U.S. Triple Crown races.

=== 1963: Three-year-old season ===
==== Kentucky Derby ====
The 1963 edition of the Kentucky Derby, the first leg of the Triple Crown series, saw 120,000 patrons gather at Churchill Downs for a race that featured three Thoroughbred stars. TIME magazine reported jockey Eddie Arcaro as saying: "I can't remember a Derby creating so much excitement."

Although Never Bend had won the Flamingo Stakes at Hialeah Park and the Stepping Stone Purse at Churchill Downs, leading up to May's Kentucky Derby he had been outshone by the undefeated Candy Spots, that had won the Florida Derby and Santa Anita Derby. At the same time, a Greentree Stable colt named No Robbery had won the Wood Memorial Stakes and also came into the Derby undefeated. By post time, bettors made Candy Spots the 3–2 favorite, No Robbery the second choice at 5–2, and Never Bend the third choice at odds of 3–1. When the gate opened, Never Bend quickly took the lead and held it until the eighth pole, when Chateaugay came from sixth place to win by 1¼ lengths.

==== Preakness Stakes ====
In the Preakness Stakes at Pimlico Race Course in Baltimore, Maryland, Never Bend again faced Candy Spots and Chateaugay. Bettors still made Candy Spots the favorite. As he had in the Derby, Never Bend charged out to an early lead with Candy Spots in third. As they turned into the homestretch, Chateaugay came from well back to catch and pass Never Bend, which had fallen behind the then front-running Candy Spots. He finished third behind Chateaugay and the race winner, Candy Spots.

==== Later three-year-old season ====
Never Bend did not run in the third leg of the U.S. Triple Crown series. Before being retired, in the fall of that year, he finished second to Mongo in the United Nations Handicap and second to the Kelso in the Woodward Stakes. In October, Never Bend easily defeated Chateaugay in winning the Yankee Handicap by four lengths at Suffolk Downs.

== Retirement and Breeding Career ==
Never Bend retired to stand at stud for the 1964 season and became a very important sire, producing 61 stakes winners. His most famous son was Mill Reef, ranked fourth on the list of the European top 100 horses of the 20th century and a leading sire whose race wins include The Derby and the Prix de l'Arc de Triomphe. Never Bend's other progeny included Riverman, a two-time leading sire in France; Triple Bend, which set a world-record time of 119.80 for seven furlongs on dirt in winning the 1972 Los Angeles Handicap; and J. O. Tobin, Champion two-year-old in England and Eclipse Award sprinter in the U.S. at age four, that handed Seattle Slew his first defeat. Never Bend was also the broodmare sire of 115 stakes winners, with two of his mares voted Kentucky Broodmare of the Year.

Foaled	Name	Sex	Major Wins/Achievements
1968	Mill Reef	Stallion	Epsom Derby, Prix de l'Arc de Triomphe
1968	Triple Bend	Stallion	Santa Anita Handicap
1969	Riverman	Stallion	Poule d'Essai des Poulains, Leading sire in France (1980, 1981)

Never Bend died in 1977 at the age of 17.

== Pedigree ==
Pedigree of Never Bend, brown stallion, 1960
Sire Nasrullah	Nearco	Pharos	Phalaris
Sire Nasrullah	Nearco	Pharos	Scapa Flow
Sire Nasrullah	Nearco	Nogara	Havresac
Sire Nasrullah	Nearco	Nogara	Catnip
Sire Nasrullah	Mumtaz Begum	Blenheim	Blandford
Sire Nasrullah	Mumtaz Begum	Blenheim	Malva
Sire Nasrullah	Mumtaz Begum	Mumtaz Mahal	The Tetrarch
Sire Nasrullah	Mumtaz Begum	Mumtaz Mahal	Lady Josephine
Dam Lalun	Djeddah	Djebel	Tourbillon
Dam Lalun	Djeddah	Djebel	Loika
Dam Lalun	Djeddah	Djezima	Asterus
Dam Lalun	Djeddah	Djezima	Heldifann
Dam Lalun	Be Faithful	Bimelech	Black Toney
Dam Lalun	Be Faithful	Bimelech	La Troienne
Dam Lalun	Be Faithful	Bloodroot	Blue Larkspur
Dam Lalun	Be Faithful	Bloodroot	Knockaney Bridge (family: 19-b)
