= Argonaut Handicap =

The Argonaut Handicap was an American Thoroughbred horse race first run in 1940 at Hollywood Park Racetrack in Inglewood, California. A one-mile race on dirt, it was open to horses age three and older.

In 1956, Swaps won this race while setting a new world record for one mile with time of 1:33 1/5.

It was last run in 1978.

== Winners ==
- 1978 - Radar Ahead
- 1977 - Text
- 1976 - L'Heureux
- 1975 - Forceten
- 1974 - Carry The Banner
- 1973 - Out of the East
- 1972 - Kentuckian
- 1971 - Violonor
- 1970 - Western Welcome
- 1969 - Tell
- 1968 - First Mate
- 1967 - Tumble Wind
- 1966 - Exhibitionist
- 1965 - Carpenter's Rule
- 1964 - Close By
- 1963 - Oppo
- 1962 - Doc Jocoy
- 1961 - Mr. America
- 1960 - T. V. Lark
- 1959 - Hillsdale
- 1958 - Round Table
- 1957 - Terrang
- 1956 - Swaps
- 1955 - Curragh King
- 1954 - Curragh King
- 1953 - Fleet Bird
- 1952 - Admiral Drake
- 1951 - Be Fleet
- 1950 - Old Rockport
- 1949 - Ace Admiral
- 1948 - Shannon
- 1947 - Olhaverry
- 1946 - Occupy
- 1944 - Okana
- 1941 - Joy Boy
- 1940 - Specify
