= Town Policy =

Quarter Horse racehorse

- Breed: Quarter Horse
- Discipline: Racing
- Sire: Reb's Policy (TB)
- Grandsire: New Policy (TB)
- Dam: Camptown Girl
- Maternal grandsire: Breeze Bar
- Sex: Gelding
- Foaled: 1975
- Country: United States
- Color: Bay
- Breeder: Ivan Ashment
- Owner: Ivan Ashment

Record
- 64 starts, 22 wins

Earnings
- $862,000.00

Major wins
- won 8 stakes races, including Kindergarten Futurity, Los Alamitos Derby, Vessels Maturity

Awards
- 1977 Champion Quarter Running Two Year Old; 1978 Champion Quarter Running Three Year Old Gelding; 1980 Champion Quarter Running Aged Gelding

Honors
- American Quarter Horse Hall of Fame

Town Policy (1975–1984) was a Quarter Horse racehorse, noted not only for his achievements on the racetrack, but for disappearing from his stall in 1977 and being recovered five months later in Mexico. A mere ten weeks after being recovered, Town Policy went on to win the Los Alamitos Derby by two and a half lengths. He broke his shoulder in an allowance race on January 3, 1984, and was buried in the infield of Los Alamitos Race Course the next day.

Town Policy was inducted into the AQHA Hall of Fame in 1998.
