= Wind and Wuthering (horse) =

American-bred Thoroughbred racehorse

- Sire: No Robbery
- Grandsire: Swaps
- Dam: J A's Joy
- Damsire: John's Joy
- Sex: Stallion
- Foaled: 4 March 1979
- Country: United States
- Colour: Brown
- Breeder: N Mitchell, M Mooney, & D Johnson.
- Owner: Richard Cyzer & Charles Cyzer
- Trainer: Henry Candy
- Record: 12: 4-2-0

Major wins
- Somerville Tattersall Stakes (1981); Dewhurst Stakes (1981)

Awards
- Timeform rating: 132 (1981), 127 (1982); Top-rated British-trained two-year-old (1981); Timeform top-rated two-year-old (1981)

Wind and Wuthering (4 March 1979 – 1998) was an American-bred, British-trained Thoroughbred racehorse and sire. He was the leading British-trained two-year-old of his generation when he won the Dewhurst Stakes by seven lengths. In the following season he was narrowly beaten in the 2000 Guineas but ran poorly in his two subsequent races. He was then retired to stud but made little impact as a breeding stallion. He was named after the Genesis album of the same name.

== Background ==
Wind and Wuthering was a "tall, quite attractive, lengthy", dark brown colt with no white markings. He was bred in Kentucky by N Mitchell, M Mooney and D Johnson. The horse was sired by No Robbery, an American stallion who won the 1963 Wood Memorial Stakes. He became a successful sire in the United States, but was relatively unknown in Europe until the emergence of Wind and Wuthering. Wind and Wuthering's dam J A's Joy failed to win a race, but as a broodmare she produced several other winners.

As a foal, the colt was sent to the sales at Keeneland and was sold for $22,000. In the following year he entered the sales ring again at the Houghton Sales at Newmarket, Suffolk where he was sold for 10,500 guineas. The colt entered the ownership of the brothers Richard and Charles Cyzer and was sent into training with Henry Candy at Kingstone Warren in Oxfordshire.

== Racing career ==
=== 1981: two-year-old season ===
Wind and Wuthering began his racing career at Sandown Park Racecourse in April, winning a five furlong maiden race by one and a half lengths. A month later he ran in the Kris takes over the same distance at Newbury Racecourse and won by four lengths from Better Portion. He was then moved up in class for the Coventry Stakes over six furlongs at Royal Ascot. He started favourite but finished tenth behind the Guy Harwood-trained Red Sunset. Candy was initially unable to explain the colt's performance, but on the following day Wind and Wuthering was found to be lame and a veterinary examination revealed a muscle injury.

Wind and Wuthering returned to racing in August but sustained three consecutive defeats, finishing fourth in the Washington Singer Stakes and the Solario Stakes and second in the Burr Stakes at Lingfield Park Racecourse. On 1 October, Wind and Wuthering carried top weight of 130 pounds in the Listed Somerville Tattersall Stakes over seven furlongs at Newmarket Racecourse. Ridden by Candy's stable jockey Philip Waldron, he led from the start, setting a strong pace before going clear in the closing stages and winning by two and a half lengths from Wongchoi. Thirteen days later, over the same course and distance, Wind and Wuthering was one of nine colts to contest the Group One Dewhurst Stakes, Britain's most prestigious race for two-year-olds. He started at odds of 11/1 with the untested, but highly regarded Simply Great, from the Henry Cecil stable being made the 6/4 favourite ahead of the Vincent O'Brien-trained Raconteur and the Richmond Stakes winner Tender King. As in the Somerville Tattersall Stakes, Waldron sent Wind and Wuthering into the lead from the start, and steadily increased the pace, leaving many of his rivals struggling at half-distance. In the final quarter mile he drew away from the field and won easily by seven lengths from Be My Native and Tender King.

=== 1982: three-year-old season ===
Wind and Wuthering began his three-year-old season in the Greenham Stakes at Newbury in April. According to Candy he was less than fully fit as he finished fourth behind the Middle Park Stakes winner Cajun. On 1 May, Wind and Wuthering, ridden by the American jockey Steve Cauthen, started the 8/1 third favourite for the 2000 Guineas over the Rowley Mile course at Newmarket. Wiind and Wuthering, racing down the centre of the wide, straight course, went into the lead shortly after the start and set a very strong pace. Many of the leading contenders were soon under pressure, but the French-trained colt Zino produced a strong late run to catch Wind and Wuthering in the closing strides and won by a head. Timeform described the colt's run as "one of the most genuine performances we'd seen in a long time."

The remainder of Wind and Wuthering's racing career was a disappointment. Two weeks after his run at Newmarket he started the 2/1 favourite for the Irish 2000 Guineas at the Curragh but after taking the lead in the straight he finished fifth of the fourteen runners behind Dara Monarch, Tender King, Red Sunset and Anfield. In the St James's Palace Stakes at Ascot in June, Wind and Wuthering led from the start but dropped away quickly when challenged in the straight and finished seventh of the nine runners behind Dara Monarch.

Wind and Wuthering remained in training until October, and was regarded as a likely contender for the Champion Stakes, but never ran again.

== Assessment ==
In the official International Classification for 1981, Wind and Wuthering was rated the second best two-year-old in Europe, three pounds behind the French-trained colt Green Forest. The independent Timeform organisation, however, named Wind and Wuthering their best two-year-old with a rating of 132, two pounds ahead of Green Forest. Timeform argued that although Green Forest had won more major races, the form of Wind and Wuthering's Dewhurst win was clearly superior to anything achieved by the French colt. In 1982, Wind and Wuthering was rated 127 by Timeform, seven pounds behind the top-rated three-year-olds Assert and Green Forest. In the International Classification he was rated twelve pounds below the top-rated horse Golden Fleece.

== Stud record ==
Wind and Wuthering was retired from racing to become a breeding stallion at the Mint Lane Farm in Lexington, Kentucky. He had little success as a sire of winners, with the best of his offspring probably being Leggolam, a Canadian gelding who won 23 races and $423,988, competing mainly in claiming races. Wind and Wuthering was euthanized in July 1998 at Ladyhawke Ranch, California.

== Pedigree ==
Pedigree of Wind and Wuthering (USA), brown stallion, 1979
| Sire No Robbery (USA) 1960 | Swaps (USA); 1952 | Khaled | Hyperion |
| Sire No Robbery (USA) 1960 | Swaps (USA); 1952 | Khaled | Eclair |
| Sire No Robbery (USA) 1960 | Swaps (USA); 1952 | Iron Reward | Beau Pere |
| Sire No Robbery (USA) 1960 | Swaps (USA); 1952 | Iron Reward | Iron Reward |
| Sire No Robbery (USA) 1960 | Bimlette (USA); 1944 | Bimelech | Black Toney |
| Sire No Robbery (USA) 1960 | Bimlette (USA); 1944 | Bimelech | La Troienne* |
| Sire No Robbery (USA) 1960 | Bimlette (USA); 1944 | Bloodroot | Blue Larkspur |
| Sire No Robbery (USA) 1960 | Bimlette (USA); 1944 | Bloodroot | Knockaney Bridge |
| Dam J A's Joy (USA) 1965 | John's Joy (USA); 1946 | Bull Dog | Teddy* |
| Dam J A's Joy (USA) 1965 | John's Joy (USA); 1946 | Bull Dog | Plucky Liege* |
| Dam J A's Joy (USA) 1965 | John's Joy (USA); 1946 | My Auntie | Busy American |
| Dam J A's Joy (USA) 1965 | John's Joy (USA); 1946 | My Auntie | Babe K |
| Dam J A's Joy (USA) 1965 | Belle Rebelle (USA); 1950 | Count Fleet | Reigh Count |
| Dam J A's Joy (USA) 1965 | Belle Rebelle (USA); 1950 | Count Fleet | Quickly |
| Dam J A's Joy (USA) 1965 | Belle Rebelle (USA); 1950 | Gala Belle | Sir Gallahad* |
| Dam J A's Joy (USA) 1965 | Belle Rebelle (USA); 1950 | Gala Belle | Bel Tempo (Family:10-c) |

* Wind and Wuthering is inbred 5S x 4D x 5D to the stallion Teddy, meaning that he appears fifth generation (via La Troienne) on the sire side of his pedigree, and fourth generation and fifth generation (via Sir Gallahad) on the dam side of his pedigree.

* Wind and Wuthering is inbred 4D x 5D to the mare Plucky Liege, meaning that she appears fourth generation and fifth generation (via Sir Gallahad) on the dam side of his pedigree.
