= Khaled (horse) =

British-bred Thoroughbred racehorse

- Sire: Hyperion
- Grandsire: Gainsborough
- Dam: Eclair
- Damsire: Ethnarch
- Sex: Stallion
- Foaled: 1943
- Country: Great Britain
- Color: Bay
- Breeder: Aga Khan III
- Owner: 1) Aga Khan III; 2) Rex C. Ellsworth (at stud)
- Trainer: Frank Butters
- Record: 12: 6-1-1
- Earnings: US$32,825

Major wins
- Coventry Stakes (1945); Middle Park Stakes (1945); St. James's Palace Stakes (1946)

Honors
- Khaled Stakes at Hollywood Park

Khaled (1943–1968) was a British Thoroughbred racehorse best known as a sire in the United States. Bred and raced in England by the Aga Khan III, Khaled was sired by Hyperion, the 1933 Epsom Derby and St. Leger Stakes winner and a six-time Leading sire in Great Britain & Ireland. Hyperion was a son of 1918 English Triple Crown champion Gainsborough. Khaled was out of the mare Eclair, and his damsire, Ethnarch, was a son of The Tetrarch. The United Kingdom's National Horseracing Museum called The Tetrarch a "phenomenon" and reported that he was voted Britain's two-year-old of his century. In its description of the colt, the National Sporting Library's Thoroughbred Heritage website in the United States uses terminology such as "probably the greatest two-year-old of all time" and that he was "possibly the greatest runner ever."

While Khaled won important races in England, his greatest success was at stud in the United States for Californian Rex Ellsworth. Brought to Ellsworth's farm in Chino, California, in 1947, Khaled raced in 1948 with limited success. After being retired to stud, he produced sixty-one stakes winners, with Swaps being the most successful. He won the 1955 Kentucky Derby, was voted American Horse of the Year in 1956, and in 1966 was inducted into the U.S. Racing Hall of Fame. As a stallion, Swaps notably sired the 1963 Kentucky Derby winner, Chateaugay and Hall of Fame inductee Affectionately.

Some of the horses sired by Khaled were:

- Big Noise (born 1949) - won California Breeders' Champion Stakes, Del Mar Futurity, Berkeley Handicap
- Correspondent (born 1950) - won Blue Grass Stakes, Hollywood Gold Cup
- Swaps (born 1952) - U.S. Racing Hall of Fame inductee
- Terrang (born 1953) - multiple major stakes winner including the Santa Anita Derby and Santa Anita Handicap
- A Glitter (born 1955) - won Coaching Club American Oaks, Monmouth Oaks, Modesty Handicap
- Linmold (born 1956) - won Santa Anita Handicap, California Breeders' Champion Stakes
- New Policy (born 1957) - won Cinema Handicap, California Breeders' Champion Stakes, San Miguel Stakes, San Bernardino Handicap, San Pasqual Handicap, San Diego Handicap
- Physician (born 1957) - won Santa Anita Handicap, San Antonio Handicap, Pomona Handicap
- Going Abroad (born 1960) - won Hawthorne Gold Cup, set a new North American record in winning the Manhattan Handicap
- Corn Off The Cob (born 1967) - won Arlington Classic

== Sire line tree ==
- Khaled
  - Dulac
  - Big Noise
  - Correspondent
    - Sherluck
      - Dot Ed's Bluesky
        - Hello Hal
  - El Drag
  - Hillary
  - Swaps
    - Chateaugay
      - True Knight
      - Hokuto Flag
    - No Robbery
      - Wind and Wuthering
        - Leggolam
    - Eurasian
    - Laramie Trail
      - Librado
      - Lupin
      - Pitador
      - Prodigo
      - Lin Yutang
  - Terrang
    - Terlago
  - California Kid
  - Khalex
    - Albany
  - Linmold
  - New Policy
    - Reb's Policy
      - Town Policy
  - Physician
  - Going Abroad
  - Corn Off The Cob

== Pedigree ==
Pedigree of Khaled, brown stallion, 1943
Sire Hyperion (GB)	Gainsborough	Bayardo	Bay Ronald
Sire Hyperion (GB)	Gainsborough	Bayardo	Galicia
Sire Hyperion (GB)	Gainsborough	Rosedrop	St Frusquin*
Sire Hyperion (GB)	Gainsborough	Rosedrop	Rosaline
Sire Hyperion (GB)	Selene	Chaucer	St Simon*
Sire Hyperion (GB)	Selene	Chaucer	Canterbury Pilgrim
Sire Hyperion (GB)	Selene	Serenissima	Minoru
Sire Hyperion (GB)	Selene	Serenissima	Gondolette
Dam Eclair (GB)	Ethnarch	The Tetrarch	Roi Herode
Dam Eclair (GB)	Ethnarch	The Tetrarch	Vahren
Dam Eclair (GB)	Ethnarch	Karenza	William the Third*
Dam Eclair (GB)	Ethnarch	Karenza	Cassinia
Dam Eclair (GB)	Black Ray	Black Jester	Polymelus
Dam Eclair (GB)	Black Ray	Black Jester	Absurdity
Dam Eclair (GB)	Black Ray	Lady Brilliant	Sundridge
Dam Eclair (GB)	Black Ray	Lady Brilliant	Our Lassie (family: 22-d)

* Khaled is inbred 5S x 4S x 5D to the stallion St Simon, meaning that he appears fifth generation (via St Frusquin) and fourth generation on the sire side of his pedigree, and fifth generation (via William the Third) on the dam side of his pedigree.
