= Chateaugay (horse) =

American-bred Thoroughbred racehorse

- Sire: Swaps
- Grandsire: Khaled
- Dam: Banquet Bell
- Damsire: Polynesian
- Sex: Stallion
- Foaled: 1960
- Country: United States
- Colour: Chestnut
- Breeder: John W. Galbreath
- Owner: Darby Dan Farm
- Trainer: James P. Conway
- Record: 24: 11-4-2
- Earnings: $360,722

Major wins
- Blue Grass Stakes (1963); Jerome Handicap (1963) Triple Crown race wins: Kentucky Derby (1963); Belmont Stakes (1963)

Awards
- United States Champion 3-Year-Old Colt (1963)
- Last updated on April 20, 2007

Chateaugay (February 29, 1960 – May 9, 1985) was an American Thoroughbred Champion racehorse who won two of the three U.S. Triple Crown races. Bred at Darby Dan Farm near Lexington, Kentucky by his prominent owner, John W. Galbreath, Chateaugay was a son of Swaps, the 1956 U.S. Horse of the Year and a Racing Hall of Fame inductee.

== Racing career ==
=== 1962: two-year-old season ===
Racing at age two for future U.S. Hall of Fame trainer James P. Conway, Chateaugay showed limited promise, winning two of five starts but without a victory in a stakes race.

=== 1963: three-year-old season ===
==== Prep races ====
At age three, the colt began to develop and after winning the Blue Grass Stakes at Keeneland Race Course was sent to compete in America's most prestigious race, the Kentucky Derby.

==== Triple Crown races ====
The 1963 edition of the Kentucky Derby, the first leg of the Triple Crown series, saw 120,000 patrons gather at Churchill Downs for a race that featured three Thoroughbred stars. Time magazine reported jockey Eddie Arcaro as saying: "I can't remember a Derby creating so much excitement."

Leading up to the race, Rex C. Ellsworth's undefeated Candy Spots had won the Florida Derby and the Santa Anita Derby. At the same time, a Greentree Stable colt named No Robbery had won the Wood Memorial Stakes, and he too came into the Derby undefeated. Then there was Harry F. Guggenheim's 1962 U.S. 2-Year-Old Champion Colt and 1963 Flamingo Stakes winner, Never Bend. By post time, bettors had made Candy Spots the 3-2 favorite, No Robbery the second choice at 5–2, and Never Bend the third pick at odds of 3–1. Even though he came into the race undefeated at three (3-3) including a win in April's Blue Grass Stakes, Chateaugay was nearly ignored amid the hype surrounding the three star horses and was sent off at 9-1 odds.

When the gate opened, Never Bend quickly took the lead and by the 1/4 mile mark No Robbery had moved into second place along the inside rail with Candy Spots sitting third. After running in sixth place through the first three-quarters of a mile, coming out of the backstretch Chateaugay moved to the far outside and raced into fourth place behind the three leaders. As they turned for home, jockey Braulio Baeza spotted an opening between the second- and third-place horses. He raced through it to pull alongside Never Bend and then moved ahead to win the race by 1 1/4 lengths.

In the Preakness Stakes at Pimlico Race Course in Baltimore, Maryland, Chateaugay again faced both Candy Spots and Never Bend. Five days before the race, he got away from his exercise rider and equaled Pimlico's track record, working a mile in 1:37 3/5. Bettors made Candy Spots the favorite. As they had in the Derby, Never Bend charged out to an early lead with Candy Spots sitting in third. Once again, Chateaugay was far back, running seventh in the eight-horse field. As they turned onto the homestretch Chateaugay made his move and soon caught and passed Never Bend, who had fallen behind the now front-running Candy Spots. This time, Chateaugay could not catch the leader and finished second, 3 1/2 lengths back.

As a result of major renovations in progress at New York's Belmont Park, the 1963 Belmont Stakes was run at Aqueduct Racetrack. As he had been in the Derby and Preakness, Candy Spots was the betting favorite. Sent off at 9-2 odds, Chateaugay repeated his running style from the previous two Classics and was well back of the leaders. Once again, while other horses began to tire during the 1 1/2 mile race, in the stretch, Chateaugay passed Candy Spots and pulled away to win by a widening 2 1/2 lengths.

==== Later races ====
Chateaugay went on to capture the 1963 Jerome Handicap but finished third in the Dwyer and Travers Stakes.

=== Later career ===
He was raced at age four and five with limited success before being retired to stud duty at Darby Dan Farm. His progeny met with modest racing success with perhaps his best being the colt True Knight, who won several stakes races including the Jerome and Suburban Handicaps.

== Stud record ==
In 1971, Chateaugay became the first Kentucky Derby winner to be sold to Japanese interests. From 1972 until his death in 1985, he stood at a breeding farm in Japan, where he sired the 1981 Champion juvenile colt, Hokuto Flag. He also became the damsire to Tamamo Cross and Miyama Poppy.

== Pedigree ==
Pedigree of Chateaugay
Sire Swaps	Khaled	Hyperion	Gainsborough
Sire Swaps	Khaled	Hyperion	Selene*
Sire Swaps	Khaled	Eclair	Ethnarch
Sire Swaps	Khaled	Eclair	Black Ray
Sire Swaps	Iron Reward	Beau Pere	Son-in-Law
Sire Swaps	Iron Reward	Beau Pere	Cinna
Sire Swaps	Iron Reward	Iron Maiden	War Admiral
Sire Swaps	Iron Reward	Iron Maiden	Betty Derr
Dam Banquet Bell	Polynesian	Unbreakable	Sickle*
Dam Banquet Bell	Polynesian	Unbreakable	Blue Grass
Dam Banquet Bell	Polynesian	Black Polly	Polymelian
Dam Banquet Bell	Polynesian	Black Polly	Black Queen
Dam Banquet Bell	Dinner Horn	Pot Au Feu	Bruleur
Dam Banquet Bell	Dinner Horn	Pot Au Feu	Polly Peachum
Dam Banquet Bell	Dinner Horn	Tophorn	Bull Dog
Dam Banquet Bell	Dinner Horn	Tophorn	Leghorn

* Chateaugay is inbred 4S x 5D to the mare Selene, meaning that she appears fourth generation on the sire side of his pedigree, and fifth generation (via Sickle) on the dam side of his pedigree.

== In popular culture ==
- In Ken Grimwood's novel Replay, the main character is stuck in a time loop and makes his first bet (of which he already knows the outcome), on Chateaugay in the 1963 Kentucky Derby.
- In the TV show Mad Men, Season 3 Episode 3, Roger Sterling throws a Kentucky Derby party for the 1963 edition of the race.
- In the TV show St. Elsewhere, season 1, episode 8, one of the doctors states he bet and won on Chateaugay at 10 to 1 in the Kentucky Derby.
