= Rex Ellsworth =

American racehorse owner (1907–1997)

- Born: November 15, 1907; Safford, Arizona, United States
- Died: August 24, 1997 (aged 89); Chino, California, United States
- Resting place: Safford City Cemetery, Safford, Arizona
- Occupation: Thoroughbred racehorse owner/breeder
- Known for: Thoroughbred horses: Swaps, Candy Spots, Olden Times, Prove It, Prince Royal, Terrang, The Scoundrel
- Spouse: Nola Zobedia
- Parent(s): William Ellsworth & Mary Elizabeth Wanslee

Rex Cooper Ellsworth (November 15, 1907 – August 24, 1997) was a major owner in Thoroughbred racing and twice the leading breeder in the United States whose story was featured with a cover of the February 25, 1963 edition of Sports Illustrated magazine.

== Racing and breeding successes ==
Rex Ellsworth was a young man of twenty-seven when in 1933 he entered the Thoroughbred breeding and racing business with lifelong friend and trainer, Mesh Tenney. From a start with six broodmares and two weanlings he was successful enough that before long he could afford to buy horses with solid pedigrees. In Ireland in 1947, with a view to breeding, he purchased Khaled from the stud of the Aga Khan. It would be eight years later when Ellsworth first earned national attention in 1955 when his homebred son of Khaled named Swaps won the Santa Anita Derby at Santa Anita Park in Arcadia, California then the 1955 Kentucky Derby, first leg of the U.S. Triple Crown series at Churchill Downs in Louisville Kentucky. "Swaps ended his career abruptly in October, 1956, when he seriously fractured a rear leg. Fitzsimmons, Nashua's trainer, sent Tenney a special sling used to raise and lower the horse. The sling was credited with helping to save his life.

A deal was struck with John Galbreath of Darby Dan Farm in Lexington for half of Swaps, with the original agreement calling for Swaps to ship back and forth between California and Kentucky each year. Swaps did stand his first season at Ellsworth's farm in Chino, but Galbreath reportedly visited and was taken aback by the functional yet Spartan and decidedly non-Kentucky-like facilities. The next year, Ellsworth sold the other half of Swaps outright to Galbreath. The horse transferred to Darby Dan and never saw California again." In 1956 another homebred son of Khaled who was raced as Terrang provided Ellsworth with his second straight Santa Anita Derby win. Candy Spots, again one of Ellsworth's homebreds whose damsire was Khaled, gave him his third Santa Anita Derby plus a win in the second leg of the U.S. Triple Crown series when he captured the 1963 Preakness Stakes at Pimlico Race Course in Baltimore, Maryland.

In 1964, Ellsworth won Europe's most prestigious race when his newly acquired horse Prince Royal won the Prix de l'Arc de Triomphe at Longchamp Racecourse in Paris, France.

"In the mid-60s, in one of his many ventures, he brought around 400 Rocky Mountain Elk from the Yellowstone area to his ranch, reportedly with the intent of increasing the herd and eventually charging visitors to hunt them.

From the start, the elk project didn't go well. A number died during shipping and the animals originally failed to thrive in their new home. Ellsworth had them housed in a 640-acre enclosure, but the numbers had dwindled to approximately 200 in 1967 when a storm blew down a massive oak tree and damaged the tall fence surrounding them. The majority escaped and today, nearly 55 years later, large bands of elk roam all over Tehachapi mountains. The cows and calves tend to stick together at higher elevations, but bachelor herds are a frequent sight all over the local valleys. They loll in the local ponds during summers. Gardens, lawns, and lawn decorations are no match for their appetites or brute strength, but they remain a magnificent sight in front yards and in open spaces. More than one resident in the area has had been tardy to an appointment as elk are in no hurry when crossing local roads."

== Later years ==
In January 1975, financial difficulties brought an end to Ellsworth's storied horseracing and breeding career. After decades of success and innovation in the sport, his Chino, California farm was shut down, marking the close of an era. Though concerns were raised about the condition of some horses on the property during the transition, no charges were filed. Among those lost during this time was Iron Reward, the esteemed 1955 Kentucky Broodmare of the Year and a key figure in American Thoroughbred lineage as a granddaughter of War Admiral and great-granddaughter of Man o' War. Ellsworth's legacy remains one of profound influence on mid-century horse racing, with champions like Swaps cementing his place in history.
