= No Robbery =

American-bred Thoroughbred racehorse

- Sire: Swaps
- Grandsire: Khaled
- Dam: Bimlette
- Damsire: Bimelech
- Sex: Stallion
- Foaled: 1960
- Country: United States
- Colour: Bay
- Breeder: Greentree Stud
- Owner: Greentree Stable
- Trainer: John M. Gaver, Sr.
- Record: 8: 6-0-1
- Earnings: US$82,770

Major wins
- Wood Memorial Stakes (1963)
- Last updated on June 23, 2010

No Robbery (March 30, 1960 – August 31, 1985) was an American Thoroughbred racehorse owned by the renowned Whitney family's Greentree Stable who won the Wood Memorial Stakes and went into the 1963 Kentucky Derby undefeated but finished fifth.

At stud, No Robbery sired Wind and Wuthering, the top-rated British two-year-old of 1981 and Track Robbery who was voted the Eclipse Award as the 1982 American Champion Older Female Horse. He was also the damsire of Estrapade who raced and won in France and in the United States, earning 1986 American Champion Female Turf Horse honors.

== Sire line tree ==
- No Robbery
  - Wind and Wuthering
    - Leggolam
