= Candy Spots =

American-bred Thoroughbred racehorse

- Sire: Nigromante
- Grandsire: Embrujo
- Dam: Candy Dish
- Damsire: Khaled
- Sex: Stallion
- Foaled: 1960
- Country: United States
- Colour: Chestnut
- Breeder: Rex C. Ellsworth
- Owner: 1) Rex C. Ellsworth; 2) Warren B. (Bill) Terry
- Record: 22: 12-5-1
- Earnings: US$824,718

Major wins
- Arlington-Washington Futurity Stakes (1962); Futurity Trial (1962); Jersey Derby (1963); Florida Derby (1963); Santa Anita Derby (1963); American Derby (1963); Arlington Classic (1963); San Pasqual Handicap (1965) American Triple Crown wins: Preakness Stakes (1963)

Candy Spots (April 14, 1960 – March 21, 1976) was an American Thoroughbred racehorse.

== Background ==
Candy Spots was foaled in California and was named for the unusual white and black markings, similar to Bend Or spots, that speckled his chestnut hair on his hind legs and rump. He was sired by the Argentine-bred stallion Nigromante, who was brought to California by Rex Ellsworth in 1957.

== Racing career ==
Candy Spots was one of the best American juveniles of his generation, winning the Arlington-Washington Futurity Stakes among his 3 for 3 record at 2. Candy Spots was undefeated in starts going into the Kentucky Derby.

Candy Spots is best known for winning the 1963 Preakness Stakes and for coming in a close second and third, respectively, in the Belmont Stakes and Kentucky Derby to his rival Chateaugay.

His other wins in 1963 included the Jersey Derby, Florida Derby, Santa Anita Derby, American Derby and Arlington Classic.

Unraced at 4, then later in his career in 1965, he won the San Pasqual Handicap.

== Retirement ==
Candy Spots was retired to stud in 1965, but he produced few stakes winners. His only offspring of note were 1973 Santa Susana Stakes winner Belle Marie, who was also the dam of 1982 American Champion Older Male Horse Lemhi Gold. Through his daughter Candy's Best, Candy Spots was also grandsire to Candy Éclair.

Candy Spots died in Lexington, Kentucky in March 1976 at the breeding shed of Warren B. Terry's Domino Stud of a ruptured renal artery. Candy Spots was the last direct male line descendant of Rock Sand to win an American Classic Race.^{[1]}

== Breeding ==
Pedigree of Candy Spots
Sire Nigromante ch. 1944	Embrujo ch. 1936	Congreve	Copyright
Sire Nigromante ch. 1944	Embrujo ch. 1936	Congreve	Per Noi
Sire Nigromante ch. 1944	Embrujo ch. 1936	Encore	Your Majesty
Sire Nigromante ch. 1944	Embrujo ch. 1936	Encore	Efilet
Sire Nigromante ch. 1944	Nigua ch. 1936	Songe	Sundari
Sire Nigromante ch. 1944	Nigua ch. 1936	Songe	Salamanca
Sire Nigromante ch. 1944	Nigua ch. 1936	Nitouche	St. Wolf
Sire Nigromante ch. 1944	Nigua ch. 1936	Nitouche	Nenette
Dam Candy Dish bay 1953	Khaled brown 1943	Hyperion	Gainsborough
Dam Candy Dish bay 1953	Khaled brown 1943	Hyperion	Selene
Dam Candy Dish bay 1953	Khaled brown 1943	Eclair	Ethnarch
Dam Candy Dish bay 1953	Khaled brown 1943	Eclair	Black Ray
Dam Candy Dish bay 1953	Feather Time bay 1945	Beau Pere	Son-in-Law
Dam Candy Dish bay 1953	Feather Time bay 1945	Beau Pere	Cinna
Dam Candy Dish bay 1953	Feather Time bay 1945	Heather Time	Time Maker
Dam Candy Dish bay 1953	Feather Time bay 1945	Heather Time	Heatherland
