= Swaps (horse) =

American-bred Thoroughbred racehorse

- Sire: Khaled
- Grandsire: Hyperion
- Dam: Iron Reward
- Damsire: Beau Pere
- Sex: Stallion
- Foaled: March 1, 1952
- Died: 1972
- Country: United States
- Colour: Chestnut
- Breeder: Rex C. Ellsworth
- Owner: Rex C. Ellsworth; Silks: Red, Black Triangle front and back, Red and Black Cap.
- Trainer: Mesh Tenney
- Record: 25:19–2–2
- Earnings: $848,900

Major wins
- San Vicente Stakes (1955); Santa Anita Derby (1955); Californian Stakes (1955); American Derby (1955); Broward Handicap (1956); Sunset Handicap (1956); American Handicap (1956); Argonaut Handicap (1956); Hollywood Gold Cup (1956); Washington Park Handicap (1956) Triple Crown classic race wins: Kentucky Derby (1955)

Awards
- United States Horse of the Year (1956) American Champion Older Dirt Male Horse (1956)

Honours
- United States Racing Hall of Fame (1966) #20 - Top 100 U.S. Racehorses of the 20th Century; Life-size statue at Hollywood Park Racetrack; Interred - Kentucky Derby Museum at Churchill Downs; Swaps Stakes held at Hollywood Park Racetrack
- Last updated on January 10, 2017

Swaps (March 1, 1952 – November 3, 1972) was a California bred American thoroughbred racehorse. He won the Kentucky Derby in 1955 and was named United States Horse of the Year in the following year. He was known as the "California Comet," and occasionally with affection, due to his wins despite numerous injuries and treatments, the "California Cripple."

== Background ==
Swaps was a chestnut horse bred and owned by Rex Ellsworth. He was trained throughout his racing career by Mesh Tenney. He was the son of Khaled, a stallion imported from the Aga Khan's stud in Europe. His dam Iron Reward was a half-sister of the Kentucky Derby winner Iron Liege.

== Racing career ==
Trained by Mesh Tenney (who was inducted into the National Museum of Racing and Hall of Fame in 1991), bred and owned by the once cowhand Rex Ellsworth, Swaps won his first 1955 start, the San Vicente Stakes. In May 1955, he won the Kentucky Derby under jockey Willie Shoemaker, beating the heavily favored east coast star, Belair's Nashua, under Eddie Arcaro. Arcaro was quoted before the race that Summer Tan was the primary threat, which manifested the east–west division between the Swaps-Nashua camps. This rivalry culminated in a famous match race later that year.

Nashua followed up the Derby with wins in the Preakness and Belmont Stakes in which Swaps did not compete because a split hoof wall in his right forefoot, incurred in January, had inflamed again. Returning to the West Coast, Swaps broke records all over the country at various distances. On turf and on dirt, and often under heavy weight, he broke or equaled six different track records in total. With much interest in a match race between Nashua and Swaps looming, a deal between the camps was reached for the colts to meet at Chicago's Washington Park on August 31, 1955. Swaps tuned up with a win in the American Derby, setting a 1 3/16 mile course record of 1:54 3/5 on the turf. However, the day before the scheduled match race, Swaps re-injured his foot on a wet track. Nashua broke alertly under Arcaro, and he gained a tactical advantage on the lead. Arcaro's tactic forced Shoemaker with Swaps to get the worst of the poor footing. Nashua drew clear in the stretch to win easily. Nashua went on to earn 1955 U.S. Horse of the Year honors. Swaps did not race for the rest of the year as his foot healed again.

Although occasionally troubled by the hoof after the recovery, Swaps generally performed well. At the age of four, Swaps was named Horse of the Year by Turf and Sport Digest after beating Nashua by 78 votes to 45, and topping a similar poll organized by Triangle Publications. William H.P. Robertson wrote in his "History of Thoroughbred Racing in America" that Swaps "entered stud with the largest collection of recognized world records (five) in history, and a lifetime performance summary, as follows: 25 starts, 19 wins, two seconds, two thirds, earnings of $848,900."

== Racing Highlights ==
at 3:

- 1st – San Vicente Stakes
- 1st – Santa Anita Derby
- 1st – Kentucky Derby (front-running effort with a time of 2:01 4/5, 2/5 off the track record)
- 1st – Will Rogers Stakes (by 12 lengths; first stakes race in which Swaps was the betting favorite; favored in all subsequent races)
- 1st – Californian Stakes (new world record for 8 1/2 furlongs with time of 1:40 2/5, "almost casually")
- 1st – Westerner Stakes (front-running effort, "drew out at will" in the stretch to open a 10-length lead, won by 6 lengths after being eased at odds of 1–20; win betting only for a five-horse field)
- 1st – American Derby on turf (front-running effort "under restraint"; new course record, equalled American record; win and place betting only for a six-horse field)
- 2nd – Match race with Nashua

at 4:

- 1st – LA County Fair Handicap (came from behind and drew away "under wraps")
- 1st – Broward Handicap (new world record for 1 mile 70 yd with time of 1:39 3/5, carrying 130 lb., conceding at least 15 pounds to all rivals; had "mouth open" due to snug hold early and was eased late)
- 2nd – Californian (jockey Shoemaker "shut down" Swaps with less than 1/16 mile to go and a 4 length lead. Porterhouse got up for the surprise win)
- 1st – Argonaut Handicap (new world record for 1 mile with time of 1:33 1/5, replacing former record by Citation)
- 1st – Inglewood (new World record for 8 1/2 furlongs with time of 1:39 flat, carrying 130 lb.; mile split was 1:32 3/5, 3/5 faster than his own world record)
- 1st – American Handicap (equalled Noor's world record of 1:46 4/5 for 1 1/8 miles, carrying 130 lb.; conceded 19 lb to runner-up Mister Gus; win betting only for a five-horse field)
- 1st – Hollywood Gold Cup Stakes (new track record of 1:58 3/5 for 1 1/4 miles, lowering previous mark by a full second, carrying 130 lb.; win betting only despite a seven-horse field)
- 1st – Sunset Handicap (new track and world record for 1 5/8 miles with time of 2:38 1/5, lowering previous track record by 2 2/5 seconds, carrying 130 lb.; front-running effort "under stout restraint, eased in the last sixteenth of a mile)
- 7th – Arch Ward Memorial Handicap (well-beaten on a soft turf course apparently unsuitable to his sore condition)
- 1st – Washington Park Handicap (new track record of 1:33 2/5 for a mile carrying 130 lb.; six furlong split was 1:07 4/5, 2 full seconds faster than the track record)

== Leg injury ==
In October, while training for the Washington, D.C. International at Garden State Park, Cherry Hill, New Jersey, he fractured his leg in two places in his left rear cannon bone, then a week later banged his leg in his stall, breaking his cast, and extending the fractures into his pastern joint. Sunny Jim Fitzsimmons, the trainer of Nashua, sent him a special sling from Belmont Park. He initially had to be raised and lowered every 45 minutes, and trainer Mesh Tenny stayed with the horse and performed the function for the first 36 hours. In November 1956, despite losing 300 pounds during the ordeal, he jogged away from his ordeal and was saved for stud duty.

== Stud record ==
Swaps began at stud at Rex Ellsworth's farm, moving to John Galbreath's Darby Dan Farm in Lexington, Kentucky, after a season. His last five seasons were at Spendthrift Farm.

Swaps sired several dozen offspring, including 35 stakes winners. Among his most successful offspring were Chateaugay, winner of the 1963 Kentucky Derby and the 1963 Belmont Stakes, and the U.S. Hall of Fame filly, Affectionately.

In November 1972, he was euthanized at the age of 20. He was buried at Spendthrift Farm, but his remains were moved in 1986 to the Kentucky Derby Museum at Churchill Downs in Louisville, Kentucky.

== Honors ==
A bronze of Swaps with jockey Bill Shoemaker was dedicated July 1, 1958. Its design and setting was created by Millard Sheets and the sculpture by Albert Stewart. The statue stood at the Hollywood Park Racetrack Clubhouse entrance gardens from 1958 until the closing of Hollywood Park in 2014 and is currently in storage awaiting placement near SoFi Stadium which was built on the former Hollywood Park site or in a new location. Swaps was inducted into the National Museum of Racing and Hall of Fame in Saratoga Springs, New York in 1966.

In the list of the top 100 U.S. thoroughbred champions of the 20th Century by Blood-Horse magazine, Swaps ranks 20th.

== Sire line tree ==
- Swaps
  - Chateaugay
    - True Knight
    - Hokuto Flag
  - No Robbery
    - Wind and Wuthering
      - Leggolam
  - Eurasian
  - Laramie Trail
    - Librado
    - Lupin
    - Pitador
    - Prodigo
    - Lin Yutang

== Pedigree ==
Pedigree of Swaps (USA), chestnut stallion, 1952
Sire Khaled (GB) 1943	Hyperion (GB); 1930	Gainsborough	Bayardo
Sire Khaled (GB) 1943	Hyperion (GB); 1930	Gainsborough	Rosedrop
Sire Khaled (GB) 1943	Hyperion (GB); 1930	Selene	Chaucer
Sire Khaled (GB) 1943	Hyperion (GB); 1930	Selene	Serenissima
Sire Khaled (GB) 1943	Eclair (GB); 1930	Ethnarch	The Tetrarch
Sire Khaled (GB) 1943	Eclair (GB); 1930	Ethnarch	Karenza
Sire Khaled (GB) 1943	Eclair (GB); 1930	Black Ray	Black Jester*
Sire Khaled (GB) 1943	Eclair (GB); 1930	Black Ray	Lady Brilliant
Dam Iron Reward (USA) 1946	Beau Pere (GB); 1927	Son-in-Law	Dark Ronald
Dam Iron Reward (USA) 1946	Beau Pere (GB); 1927	Son-in-Law	Mother-in-Law
Dam Iron Reward (USA) 1946	Beau Pere (GB); 1927	Cinna	Polymelus*
Dam Iron Reward (USA) 1946	Beau Pere (GB); 1927	Cinna	Baroness La Fleche
Dam Iron Reward (USA) 1946	Iron Maiden (USA); 1941	War Admiral	Man o' War
Dam Iron Reward (USA) 1946	Iron Maiden (USA); 1941	War Admiral	Brushup
Dam Iron Reward (USA) 1946	Iron Maiden (USA); 1941	Betty Derr	Sir Gallahad
Dam Iron Reward (USA) 1946	Iron Maiden (USA); 1941	Betty Derr	Uncle's Lassie (Family A4)

* Swaps is inbred 5S x 4D to the stallion Polymelus, meaning that he appears fifth generation (via Black Jester) on the sire side of his pedigree, and fourth generation on the dam side of his pedigree.

== Other sources ==
- Irwin, Barry Swaps: Thoroughbred Legends Eclipse Press (2002) ISBN 978-1-58150-071-4
- Swaps pedigree
- Swaps Hall of Fame page, with photo
- Mesh Tenney's Hall of Fame Page
- Kentucky Derby Official Page
- Swaps Derby
- Profile video of Swaps at YouTube
