= Mesh Tenney =

American horse trainer (1907–1993)

Personal information
- Born: November 16, 1907 Arizona, United States
- Died: November 6, 1993 (aged 85)
- Occupation: Trainer

Horse racing career
- Sport: Horse racing
- Career wins: Not found

Major racing wins
- Hollywood Lassie Stakes (1946, 1953, 1962); American Derby (1955, 1963); Hollywood Derby (1955); Santa Anita Derby (1955, 1956, 1963); Hollywood Gold Cup (1956, 1962); Malibu Stakes (1961); Strub Stakes (1961); Santa Anita Handicap (1961); San Juan Capistrano Handicap (1962); Arlington Classic (1963); Florida Derby (1963); San Pasqual Handicap (1963, 1964, 1965); Metropolitan Handicap (1964) American Classic Race wins: Kentucky Derby (1955); Preakness Stakes (1963)

Racing awards
- U.S. National Champion Trainer by earnings (1962, 1963)

Honors
- National Museum of Racing and Hall of Fame (1991)

Significant horses
- Swaps, Prove It, Candy Spots, Olden Times, Terrang

Meshach A. "Mesh" Tenney (November 16, 1907 – November 6, 1993) was an American Thoroughbred horse trainer.

From Arizona, Tenney began his career as a Thoroughbred trainer in the western United States in 1935. He won the Santa Anita Derby three times (1955, 1956, 1963) and was the leading money-winning trainer in the United States in 1962 and 1963.

Tenney is best remembered as the trainer of Swaps, who won the 1955 Kentucky Derby and the Eclipse Award for Horse of the Year in 1956. He also trained Candy Spots, who won the 1963 Preakness Stakes and finished 2nd in both the Derby and the Belmont Stakes.

During his 40-year career, Tenney trained 36 stakes winners. In 1991, he was inducted into the National Museum of Racing and Hall of Fame.

Tenney died in Safford, Arizona, in 1993.
