= Mr. Consistency =

American-bred Thoroughbred racehorse

- Sire: Alibhai
- Grandsire: Hyperion
- Dam: Invariable
- Damsire: Thumbs Up
- Sex: Stallion
- Foaled: 1958
- Country: United States
- Colour: Bay
- Breeder: Travis M. Kerr
- Owner: 1) Kerr Stable 2) Ann Peppers
- Trainer: James I. Nazworthy
- Record: 77: 11-17-13
- Earnings: US$416,360

Major wins
- California Derby (1961); Del Mar Handicap (1963); Santa Anita Handicap (1964); San Juan Capistrano Handicap (1964); San Marcos Handicap (1964); Arcadia Handicap (1964)

Mr. Consistency (foaled 1958 in Kentucky) was an American Thoroughbred racehorse who was a multiple stakes winner including the Santa Anita Handicap, California's richest race and most important for older horses.

== Background ==
Mr. Consistency was bred and raced by Travis M. Kerr, best known as the owner of Hall of Fame inductee Round Table. He was trained by Jim Nazworthy.

== Racing career ==
Not very sound as a two-year-old, Mr. Consistency won just once in eleven starts. At age three his only significant win came in the California Derby at Golden Gate Fields and at age four he had little success. Health problems led his owner to get out of horse racing and Mr. Consistency was purchased by Mrs. Ann Peppers at the Kerr Stable dispersal on August 27, 1962.

At age five Mr. Consistency began to develop as a top runner, winning the Del Mar Handicap and running second or third in other top races for older horses. At age six, he won 5 Thoroughbred horse races, winning the Santa Anita Handicap, San Juan Capistrano Handicap, San Marcos Handicap and the Arcadia Handicap

== Stud record ==
Mr. Consistency was not successful as a sire.
