= Milwaukee Brew =

American-bred Thoroughbred racehorse

- Milwaukee Brew at Old Friends (2024)
- Sire: Wild Again
- Grandsire: Icecapade
- Dam: Ask Anita
- Damsire: Wolf Power
- Sex: Stallion
- Foaled: 1997
- Country: United States
- Colour: Bay
- Breeder: Robert Spiegel
- Owner: Stronach Stable
- Trainer: Tino Attard
- Record: 24: 8-4-5
- Earnings: $2,879,612

Major wins
- Marine Stakes (2000); Ohio Derby (2000); Californian Stakes (2002); Santa Anita Handicap (2002, 2003)

Milwaukee Brew (foaled January 31, 1997 in Kentucky) is an American Thoroughbred racehorse best known as one of only three horses to win back-to-back runnings of the Santa Anita Handicap. He is retired and moved to Old Friends Equine in 2020.

== Background ==
Out of the mare Ask Anita, he was sired by the 1984 Breeders' Cup Classic winner, Wild Again, a grandson of Nearctic. Purchased by prominent Canadian businessman Frank Stronach.

== Racing career ==
At age three Milwaukee Brew began his racing career at Woodbine Racetrack in Toronto, Ontario, before going south to compete in the United States.

Milwaukee Brew had his best earnings year in 2002 when he won the Californian Stakes and the first of his Santa Anita Handicaps, as well as running third in the Hollywood Gold Cup, Pacific Classic, and 2002 Breeders' Cup Classic (behind winner Volponi and runner-up Medaglia d'Oro).

== Stud record ==
Retired after the 2003 racing season with earnings of more than $2.8 million, Milwaukee Brew stands at stud at his owner's Adena Springs South in Williston, Florida. His offspring's thirteen wins in 2008 were the most that year of any second-crop sire.

== Pedigree ==
Milwaukee Brew's pedigree is a rare American five-cross pedigree that lacks three common ancestors of the modern thoroughbred: Northern Dancer, Mr Prospector, and Bold Ruler.

Pedigree of Milwaukee Brew (USA), bay horse 1997
Sire Wild Again (USA) 1980	Icecapade (USA); 1969	Nearctic	Nearco
Sire Wild Again (USA) 1980	Icecapade (USA); 1969	Nearctic	Lady Angela
Sire Wild Again (USA) 1980	Icecapade (USA); 1969	Shenanigans	Native Dancer
Sire Wild Again (USA) 1980	Icecapade (USA); 1969	Shenanigans	Bold Irish
Sire Wild Again (USA) 1980	Bushel-n-Peck (USA); 1958	Khaled	Hyperion
Sire Wild Again (USA) 1980	Bushel-n-Peck (USA); 1958	Khaled	Eclair
Sire Wild Again (USA) 1980	Bushel-n-Peck (USA); 1958	Dama	Dante
Sire Wild Again (USA) 1980	Bushel-n-Peck (USA); 1958	Dama	Clovelly
Dam Ask Anita (USA) 1990	Wolf Power (SAF); 1978	Flirting Around	Round Table
Dam Ask Anita (USA) 1990	Wolf Power (SAF); 1978	Flirting Around	Happy Flirt
Dam Ask Anita (USA) 1990	Wolf Power (SAF); 1978	Pandora	Casabianca
Dam Ask Anita (USA) 1990	Wolf Power (SAF); 1978	Pandora	Blue Siren
Dam Ask Anita (USA) 1990	Epanoui (USA); 1980	Val de l'Orne	Val de Loir
Dam Ask Anita (USA) 1990	Epanoui (USA); 1980	Val de l'Orne	Aglae
Dam Ask Anita (USA) 1990	Epanoui (USA); 1980	Swalthee	Sword Dancer
Dam Ask Anita (USA) 1990	Epanoui (USA); 1980	Swalthee	Amalthee (Family 20-a)
