= Prince Blessed =

American-bred Thoroughbred racehorse

- Sire: Princequillo
- Grandsire: Prince Rose
- Dam: Dog Blessed
- Damsire: Bull Dog
- Sex: Stallion
- Foaled: 1957
- Country: United States
- Colour: Bay
- Breeder: Nuckols Brothers
- Owner: Kerr Stable
- Trainer: James I. Nazworthy
- Record: 35: 8-6-4
- Earnings: US$255,805

Major wins
- Hollywood Gold Cup (1961); American Handicap (1961)

Prince Blessed (foaled 1957 in Kentucky) was an American Thoroughbred racehorse who, at $77,000, was the highest priced yearling auctioned in 1958. He is best known for winning the 1961 Hollywood Gold Cup as well as for siring Ole Bob Bowers who in turn sired the two-time American Horse of the Year and U.S. Racing Hall of Fame inductee, John Henry.

== Sire line tree ==
- Prince Blessed
  - Old Bob Bowers
    - John Henry

== Pedigree ==
Pedigree of Prince Blessed, 1957
Sire Princequillo Br. 1940	Prince Rose; 1928	Rose Prince	Prince Palatine
Sire Princequillo Br. 1940	Prince Rose; 1928	Rose Prince	Eglantine
Sire Princequillo Br. 1940	Prince Rose; 1928	Indolence	Gay Crusader
Sire Princequillo Br. 1940	Prince Rose; 1928	Indolence	Barrier
Sire Princequillo Br. 1940	Cosquilla; 1933	Papyrus	Tracery
Sire Princequillo Br. 1940	Cosquilla; 1933	Papyrus	Miss Matty
Sire Princequillo Br. 1940	Cosquilla; 1933	Quick Thought	White Eagle
Sire Princequillo Br. 1940	Cosquilla; 1933	Quick Thought	Mindful
Dam Dog Blessed 1941	Bull Dog; 1927	Teddy	Ajax
Dam Dog Blessed 1941	Bull Dog; 1927	Teddy	Rondeau
Dam Dog Blessed 1941	Bull Dog; 1927	Plucky Liege	Spearmint
Dam Dog Blessed 1941	Bull Dog; 1927	Plucky Liege	Concertina
Dam Dog Blessed 1941	Blessed Again; 1932	Blue Larkspur	Black Servant
Dam Dog Blessed 1941	Blessed Again; 1932	Blue Larkspur	Blossom Time
Dam Dog Blessed 1941	Blessed Again; 1932	Clonaslee	Orpiment
Dam Dog Blessed 1941	Blessed Again; 1932	Clonaslee	Bullet Proof
