= Jim Nazworthy =

American horse trainer

Personal information
- Born: September 3, 1926 United States
- Died: February 21, 1974 (aged 47)
- Occupation: Trainer

Horse racing career
- Sport: Horse racing
- Career wins: 231

Major racing wins
- San Pasqual Handicap (1960); Hollywood Gold Cup (1961); Del Mar Handicap (1963, 1964); Arcadia Handicap (1964); Longacres Mile (1964); San Juan Capistrano Handicap (1964); San Marcos Stakes (1964); Santa Anita Handicap (1964); Bing Crosby Handicap (1965); Carter Handicap (1965); San Bernardino Handicap (1968); Del Mar Debutante Stakes (1969); Santa Paula Stakes (1971); Monrovia Handicap (1971); Graduation Stakes (1972)

Significant horses
- Fleet Nasrullah, Prince Blessed; Viking Spirit, Mr. Consistency

James I. Nazworthy (September 3, 1926 – February 21, 1974) was an American Thoroughbred horse racing trainer.

== Career ==
Nazworthy began training horses at age twenty-one. Based in California, among his successful runners, he conditioned horses for owners such as Fannie Hertz, Travis Kerr, as well for his wife's Sledge Stable.

== Death ==
Nazworthy died in 1974 of a heart attack at age forty-seven. The Los Angeles Times February 23, 1974 obituary called Nazworthy "one of California's foremost trainers."

A resident of Arcadia, California, he was survived by his wife, Maxine, a daughter of Sidney B. Factor, and their son, David.
