= Santa Anita Handicap =

- Class: Grade I
- Location: Santa Anita Park; Arcadia, California, United States
- Inaugurated: 1935
- Race type: Thoroughbred – Flat racing
- Website: www.santaanita.com

Race information
- Distance: 1 1/4 miles (10 furlongs)
- Surface: Dirt
- Track: left-handed
- Qualification: Four-year-olds and up
- Weight: Handicap
- Purse: $300,000 (2025)

The Santa Anita Handicap is an American Thoroughbred horse race held annually in early March at Santa Anita Park in Arcadia, California. It is a Grade I race for horses four years old and up and was once considered the most important race for older horses in North America during the winter racing season. The ten-furlong Santa Anita Handicap currently offers a purse of $300,000 (2025.)

== History ==
The first race was held in 1935, just months after the track opened in late 1934, and the event was open to three-year-olds and up until 1969. The Santa Anita Handicap instantly became one of the nation's top races because it offered a minimum purse of $100,000, then a staggering amount for a horse race. In its early years, the race was most commonly referred to among horsemen and racing media as the "Hundred-Grander." Another nickname for the race dating back to that time, "The Big 'Cap", is still in regular use.

Probably the dominant figure in the early years of the race was Seabiscuit, as the race proved to be a metaphor for his career. In his first two attempts to win it in 1937 and 1938, he lost in photo finishes, with the second loss to a horse carrying 30 pounds less than he was. He suffered what was believed to be a career-ending injury while preparing for the 1939 edition. He came back to run in the Hundred-Grander in 1940, finally winning in his last race.

The 2019 race was postponed from early March to early April due to Santa Anita's safety-related suspension of live racing.

== Records ==
Speed record:

- 1:58.17 – Game On Dude (2014)

Most wins:

- 3 – Game On Dude (2011, 2013, 2014)

Most wins by a jockey:

- 11 – Bill Shoemaker (1954, 1955, 1958, 1961, 1966, 1967, 1971, 1975, 1980, 1982, 1985)

Most wins by a trainer:

- 9 – Charlie Whittingham (1957, 1967, 1971, 1973, 1975, 1985, 1986, 1990, 1993)

Most wins by an owner:

- 3 – Charles S. Howard (1939, 1940, 1950)
- 3 – Lanni Family Trust, Mercedes Stable & Bernard C. Schiappa (2011, 2013, 2014)
- 3 – Hronis Racing LLC (2018, 2019, 2020)

== Winners ==
Year	Winner	Age	Jockey	Trainer	Owner	Dist. (Miles)	Time	Win $	Gr.
2026	British Isles	5	Diego A. Herrera	Richard Baltas	Slam Dunk Racing, Deborah A. Baltas and Cynthia McClanahan	1-1/4 m	2:05.17	$180,000	G1
2025	Locked	4	José Ortiz	Todd A. Pletcher	Eclipse Thoroughbred Partners and Walmac Farm LLC	1-1/4 m	2:01.71	$180,000	G1
2024	Newgate	4	Frankie Dettori	Bob Baffert	SF Racing LLC, Starlight Racing Et Al	1-1/4 m	2:03.49	$242,000	G1
2023	Stilleto Boy	5	Kent Desormeaux	Ed Moger Jr.	Steve Moger	1-1/4 m	2:01.96	$300,000	G1
2022	Express Train	5	Victor Espinoza	John Shirreffs	C R K Stable	1-1/4 m	2:03.22	$390,000	G1
2021	Idol	4	Joel Rosario	Richard Baltas	Calvin Nguyen	1-1/4 m	2:02.46	$240,000	G1
2020	Combatant	5	Joel Rosario	John W. Sadler	Hronis Racing LLC (Kosta & Pete Hronis)	1-1/4 m	2:02.32	$360,000	G1
2019	Gift Box	6	Joel Rosario	John W. Sadler	Hronis Racing LLC (Kosta & Pete Hronis)	1-1/4 m	2:03.02	$355,000	G1
2018	Accelerate	5	Victor Espinoza	John W. Sadler	Hronis Racing LLC (Kosta & Pete Hronis)	1-1/4 m	2:01.83	$355,000	G1
2017	Shaman Ghost	5	Javier Castellano	Jimmy Jerkens	Adena Springs	1-1/4 m	2:01.57	$450,000	G1
2016	Melatonin	5	Joseph Talamo	David E. Hofmans	Tarabilla Farms Inc. (Susan Osborne)	1-1/4 m	2:02.01	$600,000	G1
2015	Shared Belief	4	Mike Smith	Jerry Hollendorfer	Jungle Racing (Jim & Janet Rome)	1-1/4 m	2:00.67	$600,000	G1
2014	Game On Dude	7	Mike Smith	Bob Baffert	Lanni Family Trust, Mercedes Stable & Bernard C. Schiappa	1-1/4 m	1:58.17	$450,000	G1
2013	Game On Dude	6	Mike Smith	Bob Baffert	Lanni Family Trust, Mercedes Stable & Bernard C. Schiappa	1-1/4 m	2:00.14	$450,000	G1
2012	Ron the Greek	5	Jose Lezcano	William I. Mott	Brous Stable (Nils Brous), Wachtel Stable (Adam Wachtel), Jack T. Hammer	1-1/4 m	2:00.41	$450,000	G1
2011	Game On Dude	4	Chantal Sutherland	Bob Baffert	Lanni Family Trust, Mercedes Stable & Bernard C. Schiappa	1-1/4 m	1:59.47	$450,000	G1
2010	Misremembered	4	Martin Garcia	Bob Baffert	Jill Baffert & George Jacobs	1-1/4 m	2:00.20	$450,000	G1
2009	Einstein	7	Julien Leparoux	Helen Pitts-Blasi	Midnight Cry Stable	1-1/4 m	2:01.93	$600,000	G1
2008	Heatseeker	5	Rafael Bejarano	Jerry Hollendorfer	William de Burgh	1-1/4 m	2:00.42	$600,000	G1
2007	Lava Man	6	Corey Nakatani	Doug O'Neill	STD Racing (Dave & Steve Kenly) & Jason Wood	1-1/4 m	2:02.11	$600,000	G1
2006	Lava Man	5	Corey Nakatani	Doug O'Neill	STD Racing (Steve & Dave Kenly) & Jason Wood	1-1/4 m	2:00.57	$600,000	G1
2005	Rock Hard Ten	4	Gary Stevens	Richard Mandella	Mercedes Stable	1-1/4 m	2:01.20	$600,000	G1
2004	Southern Image	4	Victor Espinoza	Michael Machowsky	Kagele Bros, Tepper and Blahut	1-1/4 m	2:01.64	$600,000	G1
2003	Milwaukee Brew	6	Edgar Prado	Robert J. Frankel	Stronach Stables	1-1/4 m	1:59.80	$600,000	G1
2002	Milwaukee Brew	5	Kent Desormeaux	Robert J. Frankel	Stronach Stables	1-1/4 m	2:01.02	$600,000	G1
2001	Tiznow	4	Chris McCarron	Jay M. Robbins	Michael Cooper & Cecilia Straub-Rubens	1-1/4 m	2:01.55	$600,000	G1
2000	General Challenge	4	Corey Nakatani	Bob Baffert	Golden Eagle Farm	1-1/4 m	2:01.49	$600,000	G1
1999	Free House	5	Chris McCarron	J. Paco Gonzalez	McCaffery & Toffan	1-1/4 m	2:00.67	$600,000	G1
1998	Malek	5	Alex Solis	Richard Mandella	Stud Panter (Francisco Cortez)	1-1/4 m	2:02.26	$600,000	G1
1997	Siphon	6	David Flores	Richard Mandella	Rio Claro Thoroughbreds (Linneo Eduardo De Paula Machado)	1-1/4 m	2:02.23	$600,000	G1
1996	Mr. Purple	4	Ed Delahoussaye	Ron McAnally	Alex G. Campbell Jr.	1-1/4 m	2:02.04	$600,000	G1
1995	Urgent Request	5	Gary Stevens	Rodney Rash	Stewart Aitken	1-1/4 m	1:59.25	$550,000	G1
1994	Stuka †	4	Chris Antley	Gary F. Jones	Allen E. Paulson	1-1/4 m	2:00.17	$550,000	G1
1993	Sir Beaufort	6	Pat Valenzuela	Charlie Whittingham	Victoria Calantoni	1-1/4 m	2:00.40	$550,000	G1
1992	Best Pal	4	Kent Desormeaux	Gary F. Jones	Golden Eagle Farm	1-1/4 m	1:59.00	$550,000	G1
1991	Farma Way	4	Gary Stevens	D. Wayne Lukas	Quarter B Farm (George R. Bunn)	1-1/4 m	2:00.30	$550,000	G1
1990	Ruhlmann	5	Gary Stevens	Charlie Whittingham	Ann & Jerry Moss	1-1/4 m	2:01.20	$550,000	G1
1989	Martial Law	4	Martin Pedroza	Julio C. Canani	Hughes, Messina Et Al	1-1/4 m	1:58.80	$550,000	G1
1988	Alysheba	4	Chris McCarron	Jack Van Berg	Dorothy & Pamela Scharbauer	1-1/4 m	1:59.80	$550,000	G1
1987	Broad Brush	4	Ángel Cordero Jr.	Richard W. Small	Robert E. Meyerhoff	1-1/4 m	2:00.60	$550,000	G1
1986	Greinton	5	Laffit Pincay Jr.	Charlie Whittingham	Mary Jones Bradley, Whittingham, Howell Wynne	1-1/4 m	2:00.00	$689,500	G1
1985	Lord at War (ARG)	5	Bill Shoemaker	Charlie Whittingham	Peter Perkins	1-1/4 m	2:00.60	$275,600	G1
1984	Interco	4	Pat Valenzuela	Ted West	David I. Sofro	1-1/4 m	2:00.60	$298,650	G1
1983	Bates Motel	4	Terry Lipham	John H. M. Gosden	Jacqueline Getty Phillips & Michael D. Riordan	1-1/4 m	1:59.60	$317,350	G1
1982	John Henry †	7	Bill Shoemaker	Ron McAnally	Dotsam Stable	1-1/4 m	1:59.00	$318,800	G1
1981	John Henry	6	Laffit Pincay Jr.	Ron McAnally	Dotsam Stable	1-1/4 m	1:59.40	$238,150	G1
1980	Spectacular Bid	4	Bill Shoemaker	Bud Delp	Hawksworth Farm	1-1/4 m	2:00.60	$190,000	G1
1979	Affirmed	4	Laffit Pincay Jr.	Laz Barrera	Harbor View Farm	1-1/4 m	1:58.60	$192,800	G1
1978	Vigors	5	Darrel McHargue	Larry J. Sterling	William R. Hawn	1-1/4 m	2:01.20	$180,000	G1
1977	Crystal Water	4	Laffit Pincay Jr.	Roger Clapp	Connie M. Ring	1-1/4 m	1:59.20	$173,550	G1
1976	Royal Glint	6	Jorge Tejeira	Gordon R. Potter	Dan Lasater	1-1/4 m	2:00.40	$155,900	G1
1975	Stardust Mel	4	Bill Shoemaker	Charlie Whittingham	Marjorie L. Everett	1-1/4 m	2:06.40	$105,500	G1
1974	Prince Dantan	4	Ron Turcotte	Frank "Pancho" Martin	Sigmund Sommer	1-1/4 m	2:03.60	$105,000	G1
1973	Cougar II	7	Laffit Pincay Jr.	Charlie Whittingham	Mary F. Jones	1-1/4 m	2:00.00	$105,000	G1
1972	Triple Bend	4	Donald Pierce	Vance Longden	Frank M. McMahon	1-1/4 m	2:00.00	$105,000	
1971	Ack Ack	5	Bill Shoemaker	Charlie Whittingham	Forked Lightning Ranch	1-1/4 m	2:03.00	$100,000	
1970	Quicken Tree	7	Fernando Alvarez	William T. Canney	Louis R. Rowan & Wheelock Whitney Jr.	1-1/4 m	1:59.60	$100,000	
1969	Nodouble	4	Eddie Belmonte	J. Bert Sonnier	Verna Lea Farm (Gene Goff)	1-1/4 m	2:01.80	$100,000	
1968	Mr. Right	5	Moises Yanez	Evan S. Jackson	Cheray Duchin	1-1/4 m	2:04.60	$100,000	
1967	Pretense	4	Bill Shoemaker	Charlie Whittingham	Llangollen Farm Stable	1-1/4 m	2:00.80	$100,000	
1966	Lucky Debonair	4	Bill Shoemaker	Frank Catrone	Ada L. Rice	1-1/4 m	2:00.20	$100,000	
1965	Hill Rise	4	Donald Pierce	William B. Finnegan	El Peco Ranch	1-1/4 m	2:00.60	$100,000	
1964	Mr. Consistency	6	Kenneth Church	James I. Nazworthy	Ann Peppers	1-1/4 m	2:01.00	$102,100	
1963	Crozier	5	Braulio Baeza	Julius E. Tinsley Jr.	Fred W. Hooper	1-1/4 m	2:00.80	$100,000	
1962	Physician	5	Donald Pierce	Lynn A. Boice	Lynn A. Boice	1-1/4 m	2:02.60	$100,000	
1961	Prove It	4	Bill Shoemaker	Mesh Tenney	Rex C. Ellsworth	1-1/4 m	2:00.00	$100,000	
1960	Linmold	4	Donald Pierce	Harold C. McBride	Linne I. & Hazel Nelson	1-1/4 m	2:00.60	$97,900	
1959	Terrang	6	William Boland	Carl A. Roles	Poltex Stable (Lawrence S. Pollock) & Roland Bond	1-1/4 m	2:00.00	$97,900	
1958	Round Table	4	Bill Shoemaker	William Molter	Kerr Stable	1-1/4 m	1:59.80	$97,900	
1957	Corn Husker	4	Ralph Neves	Charlie Whittingham	Llangollen Farm Stable	1-1/4 m	2:01.80	$103,600	
1956	Bobby Brocato	5	Johnny Longden	William Molter	Kerr Stable	1-1/4 m	2:04.60	$97,900	
1955	Poona II	4	Bill Shoemaker	Red McDaniel	Helbush Farm (Herman H. Helbush)	1-1/4 m	2:03.00	$103,300	
1954	Rejected	4	Bill Shoemaker	William J. Hirsch	King Ranch	1-1/4 m	2:00.60	$105,900	
1953	Mark-Ye-Well	4	Eddie Arcaro	Horace A. Jones	Calumet Farm	1-1/4 m	2:01.20	$97,900	
1952	Miche †	7	John S. Covalli	Don Cameron	Muriel Vanderbilt Adams	2:01.00	1-1/4 m	$104,100	
1951	Moonrush	5	Johnny Longden	Willie Alvarado	Anita King & Gus Luellwitz	2:02.60	1-1/4 m	$97,900	
1950	Noor	5	Johnny Longden	Burley Parke	Charles S. Howard	2:00.00	1-1/4 m	$97,900	
1949	Vulcan's Forge	4	Dave Gorman	Don Cameron	Isaac J. Collins	1-1/4 m	2:02.80	$102,000	
1948	Talon	6	Eddie Arcaro	Horatio Luro	Richard N. Ryan	1-1/4 m	2:03.40	$102,500	
1947	Olhaverry	8	Melvin Peterson	Anthony E. Silver	Pan De Azucar Stable (Raoul Espinosa)	1-1/4 m	2:01.80	$98,900	
1946	War Knight	6	John H. Adams	Charlie Leavitt	Ethel Hill	1-1/4 m	2:01.60	$101,220	
1945	Thumbs Up	6	Johnny Longden	George M. Odom	Louis B. Mayer	1-1/4 m	2:01.20	$82,925	
1941	Bay View	4	Nick Wall	Patrick F. Dwyer	Anthony Pelleteri	1-1/4 m	2:05.40	$89,360	
1940	Seabiscuit	7	Red Pollard	Tom Smith	Charles S. Howard	1-1/4 m	2:01.20	$86,650	
1939	Kayak II	4	John H. Adams	Tom Smith	Charles S. Howard	1-1/4 m	2:01.40	$91,100	
1938	Stagehand	3	Nick Wall	Earl H. Sande	Maxwell Howard	1-1/4 m	2:01.60	$91,450	
1937	Rosemont	5	Harry Richards	Richard E. Handlen	Foxcatcher Farms	1-1/4 m	2:02.80	$90,700	
1936	Top Row	5	Wayne D. Wright	Albert A. Baroni	Albert A. Baroni	1-1/4 m	2:04.20	$104,600	
1935	Azucar	7	George Woolf	James Rushton	Frederick M. Alger Jr.	1-1/4 m	2:02.20	$108,400	

- † In 1952, Intent won the race but was disqualified to second place.
- † In 1982, Perrault won the race but was disqualified to second place.
- † In 1994, The Wicked North won the race but was disqualified to fourth place.
