= Champ Pegasus =

American thoroughbred racehorse

- Breed: Thoroughbred
- Sire: Fusaichi Pegasus
- Grandsire: Mr. Prospector
- Dam: Salt Champ
- Damsire: Salt Lake
- Foaled: April 6th, 2006
- Country: USA
- Color: Bay Horse
- Breeder: Diamond A Racing Corp & Arturo Vargas
- Owner: Diamond A Racing Corporation and Vargas, Arturo and Eduardo
- Trainer: Richard E. Mandella
- Jockey: Garrett K. Gomez
- Record: 14:5-5-1

Major wins
- Clement L. Hirsch Turf Championship Stakes (2010); San Luis Obispo Handicap (2011)

Champ Pegasus (foaled April 6th, 2006) is an American Thoroughbred racehorse and the winner of the 2010 Clement L. Hirsch Turf Championship Stakes.

== Career ==
Champ Pegasus' first race was on December 9, 2009, at Hollywood Park, where he came in 5th. He gained his first win on April 14, 2010, at Santa Anita, and then won again at Hollywood Park on June 12, 2010.

He won his first graded race on August 29, 2010, by winning the 2010 Del Mar Handicap. He then won his second graded race on October 3, 2010, as he won the Clement L. Hirsch Turf Championship Stakes.

He placed second in the 2010 Breeders' Cup Turf in November and then placed second again in the January 2011 San Marcos Stakes.

He then grabbed the last win of his career on February 19, 2011, at the San Luis Obispo Handicap.

In his final race on October 2, 2011, he came in second place at the Clement L. Hirsch Turf Championship Stakes.

== Pedigree ==
Pedigree of Champ Pegasus (USA), 2006
Sire Fusaichi Pegasus (USA) 1997	Mr. Prospector (USA); 1970	Raise a Native	Native Dancer
Sire Fusaichi Pegasus (USA) 1997	Mr. Prospector (USA); 1970	Raise a Native	Raise You
Sire Fusaichi Pegasus (USA) 1997	Mr. Prospector (USA); 1970	Gold Digger	Nashua
Sire Fusaichi Pegasus (USA) 1997	Mr. Prospector (USA); 1970	Gold Digger	Sequence
Sire Fusaichi Pegasus (USA) 1997	Angel Fever (USA); 1990	Danzig	Northern Dancer
Sire Fusaichi Pegasus (USA) 1997	Angel Fever (USA); 1990	Danzig	Pas De Nom
Sire Fusaichi Pegasus (USA) 1997	Angel Fever (USA); 1990	Rowdy Angel	Halo
Sire Fusaichi Pegasus (USA) 1997	Angel Fever (USA); 1990	Rowdy Angel	Ramhyde
Dam Salt Champ (ARG) 2000	Salt Lake (USA); 1989	Deputy Minister	Vice Regent
Dam Salt Champ (ARG) 2000	Salt Lake (USA); 1989	Deputy Minister	Mint Copy
Dam Salt Champ (ARG) 2000	Salt Lake (USA); 1989	Take Lady Anne	Queen City Lad
Dam Salt Champ (ARG) 2000	Salt Lake (USA); 1989	Take Lady Anne	Lovita H.
Dam Salt Champ (ARG) 2000	Wandel (ARG); 1993	Fitzcarraldo	Cipayo
Dam Salt Champ (ARG) 2000	Wandel (ARG); 1993	Fitzcarraldo	Stall Only
Dam Salt Champ (ARG) 2000	Wandel (ARG); 1993	La Brujula	Cipol
Dam Salt Champ (ARG) 2000	Wandel (ARG); 1993	La Brujula	North Star
