= Red giant (disambiguation) =

Red giant and similar can mean:

- red giant, a stage in evolution of stars
- Red Giant (horse), a racehorse
- Red Giant Entertainment, a comic book publisher
- Red Giant Movies, the production studio of Udhayanidhi Stalin
- Red Giant, a 2011 album by Century
- Red Giants (basketball), basketball team in the Netherlands
