= Johar =

American Thoroughbred racehorse

- Sire: Gone West
- Grandsire: Mr. Prospector
- Dam: Windsharp
- Damsire: Lear Fan
- Sex: Stallion
- Foaled: February 28, 1999
- Died: 10 November 2014 (aged 15)
- Country: United States
- Color: Bay
- Breeder: The Thoroughbred Corp.
- Owner: The Thoroughbred Corp.
- Trainer: Richard E. Mandella
- Record: 16: 6-4-2
- Earnings: US$1,494,496

Major wins
- Hollywood Derby (2002); Oak Tree Derby (2002); San Marcos Handicap (2003) Breeders' Cup wins: Breeders' Cup Turf (2003)

Johar (foaled February 28, 1999 in Kentucky, died November 10, 2014) was an American Thoroughbred racehorse best known for winning the 2003 Breeders' Cup Turf in a dead heat with High Chaparral.

Bred and raced by Prince Ahmed bin Salman's The Thoroughbred Corp., his sire Gone West, a son of the sire Mr. Prospector, was a millionaire multiple stakes winner and a sire and a sire of sires who sold for US$6.1 million. His dam was Windsharp, a multiple Grade 1 winner in the United States and the 1996 Canadian Champion Older Female Horse and Canadian Champion Female Turf Horse Damsire, Lear Fan, raced in England and France and won the Grade 1 Prix Jacques Le Marois.

Trained by Richard Mandella, Johar was unraced at two but at age three made eleven starts from a base in California. He won four times including the Grade 1 Hollywood Derby and Grade 2 Oak Tree Derby. At four in 2003, the colt won the Grade 2 San Marcos Handicap in January at Santa Anita Park but a shoulder fracture kept him out of racing until late summer. In his August 22 comeback he finished third to winner Irish Warrior in the Harry F. Brubaker Handicap at Del Mar Racetrack. Johar then ran second to Storming Home in the September 28 Clement L. Hirsch Memorial Turf Championship before winning the most important race of his career, the October 25 Breeders' Cup Turf, held that year at Santa Anita Park. Johar, last until the field moved through the backstretch, made a powerful late run down the middle of the homestretch to finish first in a dead-heat with High Chaparral and barely a nose ahead of third-place finisher Falbrav. As co-winner of the first dead-heat in Breeders' Cup history, Johar defeated other top runners such as The Tin Man (4th), and the betting favorite, Storming Home (7th).

Johar was retired to stud for the 2005 season. As of September 25, 2009, he had sired twenty-three race winners.
