= Blood-Horse magazine Top 100 Racehorses of the 20th Century =

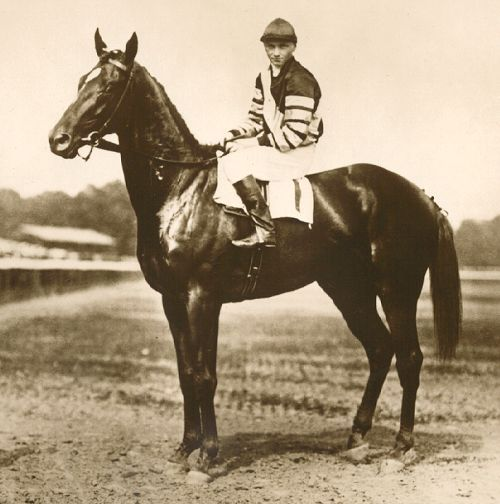
Man o' War, shown with jockey Clarence Kummer in 1920, was voted number one on the list

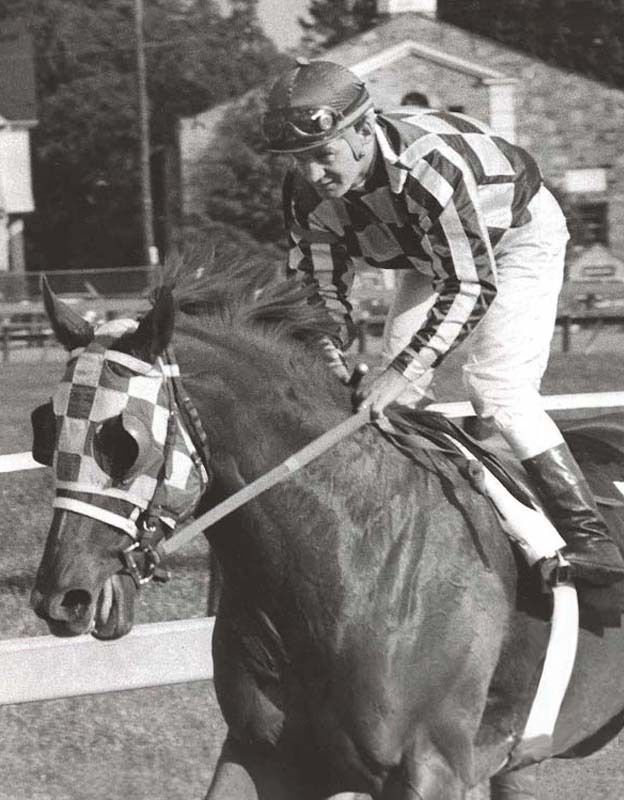
Secretariat and jockey Ron Turcotte in 1973. who would have been named the number one horse but was left entirely off one of the seven ballots, and thus ranked number two

Around 1998, The Blood-Horse magazine polled a seven-person panel of distinguished horse racing officials and journalists: Keeneland racing secretary Howard Battle, Maryland Jockey Club vice president Lenny Hale, Daily Racing Form columnist Jay Hovdey, Sports Illustrated senior writer William Nack, California senior steward Pete Pedersen, Louisville Courier-Journal racing writer Jennie Rees and Gulfstream Park steward Tommy Trotter. Each of the experts compiled a list of what they considered to be the top 100 Thoroughbred racehorses of the 20th century, which was then combined into a master list first published in a special issue of the magazine in February 1999. The controversial list, which named Man O'War number one and Secretariat number two, was expanded into a 1999 book which included complete biographies of the horses.

All the horses on the list had raced in the United States except Phar Lap, and a few others such as Northern Dancer, Dahlia and Miesque began their careers in another country. Ruffian was the top-ranked filly.

The small body of voters meant that any individual ballot had the potential to disproportionately influence the final tally, which ended up coming to pass. At the time of the list's unveiling, Blood-Horse managing editor Evan Hammonds spoke to the Associated Press. Hammonds revealed that Secretariat and Man o' War had both received three of the seven first-place votes. (Citation received the other first-place vote.) Man o' War was listed in first, second or third place on all seven ballots; six of the voters gave the same placement to Secretariat. However, Hammonds noted, a single voter left Secretariat out of that person's top 10 "because he didn't win all his races, because he got beat a few times". The result was that Secretariat became second, rather than first, in the aggregated final list.

Blood-Horse promotes its top two selections as a ranking that "will generate debate for years to come". After the results became available, panel-member William Nack criticized the voting process as "skewered" because one of the seven voters had ranked Secretariat 14th, thus costing him the top slot. "That's an outrage," Nack told the New York Daily News. "You mean this one person thought Secretariat would finish last in a 14-horse race?"

The electoral friction was reflected in the introduction to the Top 100 Racehorses book produced by Blood-Horse, which conceded, "For all the work and dreaming that went into it... one approaches the list... with a nagging sense of its folly as a rational exercise and of the maddening arbitrariness of its outcome."

A total of 192 horses received at least one vote for inclusion in the list.

== Rankings ==
The top 25 of the list is as follows:

Rank	Name	Foaled	Owner	Breeder	Trainer
#1	Man o' War	1917	Samuel D. Riddle	August Belmont II and Nursery Stud (KY)	Louis Feustel
#2	Secretariat*	1970	Meadow Stable	Meadow Stud (VA)	Lucien Laurin
#3	Citation*	1945	Calumet Farm	Calumet Farm (KY)	Ben A. Jones and H.A. Jones
#4	Kelso	1957	Bohemia Stable	Bohemia Stable (KY)	Dr. John Lee and Carl H. Hanford
#5	Count Fleet*	1940	Mrs. John D. Hertz	Mrs. John D. Hertz (KY)	G.D. Cameron
#6	Dr. Fager	1964	Tartan Stable	Tartan Farms (FI)	John Nerud
#7	Native Dancer	1950	Alfred G. Vanderbilt	Alfred G. Vanderbilt (KY)	W.C. Winfrey
#8	Forego	1970	Lazy F. Ranch	Lazy F. Ranch (KY)	Frank Y. Whiteley Jr.
#9	Seattle Slew*	1974	Tayhill Stable	Ben S. Castleman (KY)	William H. Turner and Douglas Peterson
#10	Spectacular Bid	1976	Hawksworth Farm	Mrs. William Jason and Mrs. William Gilmore (KY)	Grover G. "Bud" Delp
#11	Tom Fool	1949	Greentree Stable	Duval Headley (KY)	John M. Gaver
#12	Affirmed*	1975	Louis Wolfson	Harbor View Farm (FI)	Lazaro S. Barrera
#13	War Admiral*	1934	Glen Riddle Farm	Samuel D. Riddle (KY)	George Conway
#14	Buckpasser	1963	Ogden Phipps	Ogden Phipps (KY)	W.C. Winfrey and Eddie A. Neloy
#15	Colin	1905	James R. Keene	James R. Keene (KY)	James G. Rowe Sr.
#16	Damascus	1964	Mrs. Thomas Bancroft	Mrs. Thomas Bancroft (KY)	Frank Y. Whiteley Jr.
#17	Round Table	1954	A.B. Hancock Jr. and Travis M. Kerr	Claiborne Farm (KY)	Moody Jolley and William Molter
#18	Cigar	1990	Allen Paulson	Allen Paulson (MD)	William I. Mott
#19	Bold Ruler	1954	Wheatley Stable	Wheatley Stable (KY)	James "Sunny Jim" Fitzsimmons
#20	Swaps	1952	Rex C. Ellisworth	Rex C. Ellisworth (CA)	Meshach "Mesh" Tenney
#21	Equipoise	1928	C.V. Whitney	Harry Payne Whitney (KY)	Fred Hopkins and T.J. Healey
#22	Phar Lap (NZ)	1926	David J. Davis and H. R. Telford	A.F. Roberts (NZ)	Tommy Woodcock
#23	John Henry	1975	Dotsam Stable	Golden Chance Farm (KY)	Ronald McAnally
#24	Nashua	1952	Belair Stud and Leslie Combs II syndicate	Belair Stud (KY)	James "Sunny Jim" Fitzsimmons
#25	Seabiscuit	1933	Wheatley Stable and Charles S. Howard	Wheatley Stable (KY)	James "Sunny Jim" Fitzsimmons and Tom Smith

Other notable rankings include:

- #30 - Sysonby (foaled 1902), tied with Artful (ranked #94) and Beldame (ranked #98), for oldest horse on the list
- #35 - Ruffian (foaled 1972), the highest-ranked filly

* Triple Crown winner

== Other polls ==
=== 1992 Sports Illustrated poll ===
Sports Illustrated had conducted a 1992 poll of a panel of seven experts: (Joe Hirsch, executive columnist, Daily Racing Form; Woody Stephens, thoroughbred trainer for more than 50 years; Jim McKay, broadcaster, ABC Sports; Jim Bolus, secretary-treasurer, National Turf Writers Association; Frank E. Kilroe, retired California racing official; Tommy Trotter, Arlington International Racecourse steward; and William F. Reed, turf writer for 28 years) with Man o' War voted the No. 1 greatest horse in racing history, with Secretariat No. 2.

=== 1999 Associated Press poll ===
In 1999 the Associated Press asked a panel of six voters a similar question; four chose Man o' War as best, one named Secretariat, and the sixth picked Tom Fool, who finished 11th on the Blood-Horse list.

== See also ==
- List of racehorses
