= Frank E. Kilroe Mile =

- Class: Grade II
- Location: Santa Anita Park; Arcadia, California, United States
- Inaugurated: 1960
- Race type: Thoroughbred – Flat racing
- Website: www.santaanita.com

Race information
- Distance: 1 mile (8 furlongs)
- Surface: Turf
- Track: Left-handed
- Qualification: Four-year-olds & up
- Weight: 124 lbs. with allowances
- Purse: $500,000 (2022)

The Frank E. Kilroe Mile is an American Thoroughbred horse race run in early March at Santa Anita Park in Arcadia, California. Open to horses four years of age and older, it is raced over a distance of one mile (1.6 km). The Grade II race currently offers a purse of $500,000.

The Frank E. Kilroe Mile is the official name of the race according to Santa Anita, but it is also commonly called the Frank E. Kilroe Mile Stakes. The race is named for Frank E. Kilroe, who was the racing secretary and handicapper at Santa Anita from 1953 to 1990. Kilroe was inducted into the National Museum of Racing and Hall of Fame in 2019 as a Pillar of the Turf.

== History ==
The race was inaugurated in 1960 as the Arcadia Handicap (1960–2000) and was renamed as the Frank E. Kilroe Mile Handicap in 2001. In 2010, it changed from a handicap to a stakes run on an allowance weight base.

It was raced at a distance of 1 1/4 miles until 1987. In 1972, the distance at which it was raced was "about" 1 1/4 miles. In 1987, the distance was changed to one mile. In 1975, 1976, 1978, 1983, 1995, the race was switched from turf to dirt due to weather conditions. The race was upgraded to Grade I status in 2005.

The race was open to three-year-olds and up in 1962.

In 2010, Proviso became the first mare to win the Kilroe in 51 runnings.

In 2026 the event was downgraded by the Thoroughbred Owners and Breeders Association to Grade II status.

== Records ==
Time record: (on turf at current distance of 1 mile)

- 1:31.89 – Atticus (1997)

Most wins:

- 2 – Ga Hai (1975, 1976)

Most wins by an owner:

- 2 – Laguna Seca (1975, 1976)
- 2 - Agave Racing Stable (2018, 2022)

Most wins by a jockey:

- 8 – Laffit Pincay Jr. (1970, 1978, 1979, 1981, 1982, 1992, 1995, 2001)

Most wins by a trainer:

- 7 – Charles Whittingham (1971, 1972, 1977, 1978, 1982, 1986, 1987)

== Winners of the Frank E. Kilroe Mile ==
Year	Winner	Age	Jockey	Trainer	Owner	Time
2026	Final Boss	5	Juan J. Hernandez	John W. Salder	By Talla Racing LLC and West Point Thoroughbreds	1:32.94
2025	Formidable Man	4	Umberto Rispoli	Michael W. McCarthy	Mr. and Mrs. William K. Warren Jr.	1:34.57
2024	Du Jour	6	Flavien Prat	Bob Baffert	Baffert, Natalie J and Lanni, Debbie	1:33.95
2023	(Republic of Ireland) Gold Phoenix	5	Kazushi Kimura	Philip D'Amato	Little Red Feather Racing, Sterling Stables and Marsha Naify	1:34.45
2022	Count Again	7	Flavien Prat	Philip D'Amato	Agave Racing Stable and Sam-Son Farm	1:33.24
2021	Hit The Road	4	Florent Geroux	Dan Blacker	D K Racing LLC & Taste Of Victory Stables Et Al	1:34.48
2020	River Boyne	5	Abel Cedillo	Jeff Mullins	Red Baron's Barn LLC and Rancho Temescal LLC	1:33.88
2019	(Brazil) Ohio	8	Ruben Fuentes	Michael W. McCarthy	Eclipse Thotoughbred Partners	1:33.71
2018	Bowies Hero	4	Corey S. Nakatani	Philip D'Amato	Agave Racing Stable (Mark Martinez), ERJ Racing LLC (Erik Johnson), Madaket Stables LLC	1:33.61
2017	(Brazil) Bal a Bali	6	Javier Castellano	Richard Mandella	Calumet Farm	1:33.86
2016	What a View	5	Kent Desormeaux	Kenny Black	Finish Line Racing	1:35.57
2015	Ring Weekend	4	Drayden Van Dyke	H. Graham Motion	St. Elias Stable/West Point Thoroughbreds	1:32.98
2014	(Argentina) Winning Prize	5	Corey Nakatani	Neil D. Drysdale	Heerensperger/Nelson	1:32.44
2013	(Argentina) Suggestive Boy	5	Joseph Talamo	Ron McAnally	Pozo De Luna	1:32.89
2012	(Republic of Ireland) Willyconker	5	Joel Rosario	Doug O'Neill	O'Neill & Partners	1:33.88
2011	(Brazil) Fluke	6	Rafael Bejarano	Humberto Ascanio	Patricia Bozano	1:33.50
2010	(United Kingdom) Proviso	5	Mike E. Smith	Bill Mott	Juddmonte Farm	1:35.31
2009	Gio Ponti	4	Ramon Domínguez	Christophe Clement	Castleton Lyons	1:33.65
2008	Ever a Friend	5	Tyler Baze	Mike R. Mitchell	Steve & Jeff Ustin/Dan Capen	1:33.37
2007	Kip Deville	4	Richard Migliore	Richard E. Dutrow Jr.	IEAH Stables et al.	1:33.88
2006	(United Kingdom) Milk It Mick	5	Kent Desormeaux	James M. Cassidy	Paul Dixon	1:34.49
2005	(Brazil) Leroidesanimaux	5	Jon Court	Robert J. Frankel	Stud TNT	1:33.89
2004	(United Kingdom) Sweet Return	4	Gary Stevens	Ron McAnally	Red Oak Stable	1:33.87
2003	(Brazil) Redattore	8	Alex Solis	Richard Mandella	Luis A. Taunay	1:34.94
2002	Decarchy	5	Kent Desormeaux	Robert J. Frankel	Juddmonte Farms	1:34.04
2001	Road to Slew	6	Laffit Pincay Jr.	Craig Dollase	Nick Cafarchia	1:35.96
2000	Commitisize	5	Victor Espinoza	Bob Baffert	Mike Pegram	1:36.61
1999	(United Kingdom) Lord Smith	4	Garrett Gomez	Bruce L. Jackson	Boich, Kruse & Kruse	1:34.53
1998	(Republic of Ireland) Hawksley Hill	5	Pat Day	Neil Drysdale	David & Jill Heerensperger	1:34.84
1997	Atticus	5	Corey Nakatani	Richard Mandella	La Presle Farm	1:31.89
1996	(United Kingdom) Tychonic	6	Gary Stevens	Robert J. Frankel	Juddmonte Farms	1:35.52
1995	College Town	4	Laffit Pincay Jr.	Melvin F. Stute	David N. Brown	1:40.62
1994	Megan's Interco	5	Corey Black	Jenine Sahadi	Milton M. Bronson	1:33.86
1993	(Argentina) Leger Cat	7	Corey Nakatani	Richard Mandella	Allred & Hubbard	1:34.19
1992	Fly Till Dawn	6	Laffit Pincay Jr.	Darrell Vienna	Josephine T. Gleis	1:34.69
1991	Madjaristan	5	Ed Delahoussaye	Neil Drysdale	Clover Racing Stable et al.	1:33.20
1990	Prized	4	Ed Delahoussaye	Neil Drysdale	Meadowbrook Farms et al.	1:34.40
1989	(Republic of Ireland) Bello Horizonte	6	Ed Delahoussaye	Richard J. Lundy	Allen E. Paulson	1:36.20
1988	(Republic of Ireland) Mohamed Abdu	4	Ed Delahoussaye	Richard Mulhall	Meyer & Markovic et al.	1:37.00
1987	Thrill Show	4	Bill Shoemaker	Charles Whittingham	Bradley, Duchossois et al.	1:36.00
1986	(Australia) Strawberry Road	7	Gary Stevens	Charles Whittingham	A.E. Paulson/Summa Stable	2:03.40
1985	Fatih	5	Bill Shoemaker	Hector O. Palma	Ginji Yasuda	1:59.60
1984	Sir Pele	5	Rafael Meza	Laz Barrera	Aaron U. Jones	2:01.20
1983	(Chile) Manantial	5	Kenny Black	Lee Rossi	Carl J. Maggio	2:03.40
1982	(United Kingdom) Perrault	5	Laffit Pincay Jr.	Charles Whittingham	Baron T. van Zuylen	2:04.60
1981	Premier Ministre	5	Laffit Pincay Jr.	Laz Barrera	Dolly Green	2:02.60
1980	Henschel	6	Bill Shoemaker	John W. Russell	Fred W. Hooper	1:58.80
1979	Fluorescent Light	5	Laffit Pincay Jr.	Angel Penna Sr.	Ogden Mills Phipps	2:03.60
1978	Exceller	5	Laffit Pincay Jr.	Charles Whittingham	Nelson Bunker Hunt	2:01.20
1977	Caucasus	5	Bill Shoemaker	Charles Whittingham	Cardiff Stud Farm	2:00.00
1976	Ga Hai	5	Fernando Toro	Gene Cleveland	Laguna Seca	2:00.40
1975	Ga Hai	4	Jacinto Vásquez	Gene Cleveland	Laguna Seca	2:07.00
1974	Court Ruling	4	Braulio Baeza	W. Preston King	Milton Polinger	2:01.20
1973	River Buoy	8	Donald Pierce	Jack Look	16 Ton Stable et al.	2:02.80
1973	Kobuk King	7	Jerry Lambert	Ron McAnally	Allegre Stable	2:02.80
1972	Buzkashi	5	Bill Shoemaker	Charles Whittingham	Everett-Tally	2:00.80
1972	Knight in Armor	5	Donald Pierce	Buster Millerick	Robert A. Cass	2:01.80
1971	Daryl's Joy	5	Johnny Sellers	Charles Whittingham	Robert K. C. Goh	1:59.60
1970	Royal Dynasty	4	Laffit Pincay Jr.	Melvin F. Stute	G. K. Collins	2:06.80
1969	Rivet	5	Merlin Volzke	Dale Landers	Pierce Doty	2:03.20
1968	Nashua Pilot	4	Johnny Sellers	L. G. "Brandy" Culver	John D. Askew	2:00.00
1967	Fleet Host	4	Angel Pineda	Ray Priddy	Westerly Stud	1:59.80
1966	Tudor Frame	4	Jerry Lambert	Lou Carno	Silver Creek Ranch, Inc.	2:02.80
1965	Cedar Key	5	Bill Shoemaker	Don McCoy	Jerry Basta	2:00.80
1964	Mr. Consistency	6	Kenneth Church	James I. Nazworthy	Ann Peppers	1:58.60
1963	The Axe II	5	Pete Moreno	Robert L. Wheeler	Greentree Stable	2:04.20
1962	Art Market	4	Ismael Valenzuela	Hirsch Jacobs	Jerome Fendrick	2:01.00
1961	Wolfram	5	John L. Rotz	Burley Parke	Harbor View Farm	2:01.00
1960	American Comet	4	Tommy Barrow	Martin L. Fallon	C. W. Smith Ent., Inc.	2:04.40

*Note: Run in two divisions in 1972 and 1973.
