= San Marcos Stakes =

- Class: Grade III
- Location: Santa Anita Park; Arcadia, California
- Inaugurated: 1952
- Race type: Thoroughbred – Flat racing
- Website: www.santaanita.com

Race information
- Distance: 1 1/4 miles (10 furlongs)
- Surface: Turf
- Track: Left-handed
- Qualification: Four-Year-Olds & Up
- Weight: 124 pounds with allowances
- Purse: $100,000 (2026)

The San Marcos Stakes is an American Grade III Thoroughbred horse race held annually in late January or early February at Santa Anita Park in Arcadia, California. Open to horses aged four and older, it is raced on turf over a distance of one and one-quarter miles.

Inaugurated in 1952 as a one-mile race on dirt, in 1954 it was changed to one and one-quarter miles and became Santa Anita Park's first graded stakes race on turf. It was raced on dirt again in 1956, 1962, 1969, 1973, 1975, 1978 through 1983, and in 1996.

Run as handicap prior to 2000, it is now raced under allowance weight conditions, with specified weight reductions for horses who meet certain conditions. It was open to three-year-olds and up from 1955 through 1959. There was no race held in 1970 and for 1978 it was set at a distance of 1 and one-eighth miles.

== Records ==
Time record:

- 1:57.92 – Johar (2003)

Most wins:

- 2 – Slim Shadey (2012, 2013)

Most wins by an owner:

- 2 – El Peco Ranch (1961, 1972)
- 2 – Elmendorf Farm (1976, 1982)
- 2 – Trudy McCaffery & John Toffan (1994, 2001)
- 2 – David and Jill Heerensperger (2009, 2011)

Most wins by a jockey:

- 6 – Bill Shoemaker (1958, 1959, 1967, 1971, 1975, 1977)

Most wins by a trainer:

- 8 – Charles Whittingham (1963, 1969, 1971, 1975, 1977, 1981, 1984, 1985)

== Winners of the San Marcos Stakes ==
| Year | Winner | Age | Jockey | Trainer | Owner | Time |
|---|---|---|---|---|---|---|
| 2026 | Mondego (GB) | 6 | Emisael Jaramillo | Michael McCarthy | Cheyenne Stable LLC | 2:00.06 |
| 2025 | There Goes Harvard | 6 | Lanfanco Dettori | Michael McCarthy | Barber, Gary and Eclipse Thoroughbred Partners | 1:59.87 |
| 2024 | Missed The Cut | 5 | Joel Rosario | John W. Sadler | Babington, Lef, St Elias, Hudson, Luxus | 2:01.14 |
| 2023 | Prince Abama | 5 | Flavien Prat | Michael McCarthy | Michael House | 2:01.42 |
| 2022 | Friar's Road | 5 | Flavien Prat | Michael McCarthy | William and Suzanne Warren | 1:58.67 |
| 2021 | Masteroffoxhounds | 4 | Joel Rosario | Richard Baltas | David Bersen LLC and Rockingham Ranch | 2:10.39 |
| 2020 | United | 5 | Flavien Prat | Richard Mandella | LNJ Foxwoods (Larry, Nanci & Jaime Roth) | 1:59.04 |
| 2019 | Platinum Warrior (IRE) | 4 | Shane Foley | John W. Sadler | Yueshang Zhang | 2:02.37 |
| 2018 | Itsinthepost (FR) | 6 | Tyler Baze | Jeffrey L. Mullins | Red Baron's Barn LLC | 1:58.24 |
| 2017 | Isotherm | 4 | Flavien Prat | George Weaver | Matthew Schera | 2:00.23 |
| 2016 | Flamboyant (FR) | 5 | Brice Blanc | Patrick Gallagher | David Bienstock & Charles N. Winner | 2:01.58 |
| 2015 | Finnegans Wake | 6 | Victor Espinoza | Peter Miller | Donegal Racing (Jerry Crawford), et al.) & Rockingham Ranch (Gary Hartunian & Brian Trump) | 2:00.88 |
| 2014 | Vagabond Shoes (GB) | 7 | Victor Espinoza | John W. Sadler | Hronis Racing (Kosta & Pete Hronis) | 1:58.88 |
| 2013 | Slim Shadey | 5 | Gary Stevens | Simon Callaghan | Phil Cunningham | 1:59.17 |
| 2012 | Slim Shadey | 4 | David Flores | Simon Callaghan | Phil Cunningham | 2:01.55 |
| 2011 | Bourbon Bay | 5 | Rafael Bejarano | Neil D. Drysdale | David & Jill Heerensperger | 2:00.03 |
| 2010 | Loup Breton | 6 | Garrett Gomez | Julio C. Canani | Guy Wildenstein | 2:00.94 |
| 2009 | Artiste Royal | 8 | Garrett Gomez | Neil D. Drysdale | David & Jill Heerensperger | 1:59.16 |
| 2008 | Champs Elysees | 5 | Garrett Gomez | Robert J. Frankel | Juddmonte Farms | 2:00.88 |
| 2007 | One Off | 7 | Brice Blanc | Neil D. Drysdale | Burt & Jane Bacharach | 2:01.48 |
| 2006 | The Tin Man | 8 | Victor Espinoza | Richard Mandella | Ralph & Aury Todd | 1:58.39 |
| 2005 | Whilly | 4 | Felipe Martinez | Doug O'Neill | Triple B Farm | 2:00.68 |
| 2004 | Sweet Return | 4 | Gary Stevens | Ron McAnally | Red Oak Stable (John Brunetti Sr.) | 1:58.82 |
| 2003 | Johar | 4 | Alex Solis | Richard Mandella | The Thoroughbred Corp. | 1:57.92 |
| 2002 | Irish Prize | 6 | Gary Stevens | Neil D. Drysdale | Sheik Maktoum Al Maktoum | 2:01.27 |
| 2001 | Bienamado | 5 | Chris McCarron | J. Paco Gonzalez | McCaffery/Toffan/Sangster | 2:02.75 |
| 2000 | Public Purse | 6 | Alex Solis | Robert J. Frankel | Juddmonte Farms | 1:59.59 |
| 1999 | Brave Act | 5 | Goncalino Almeida | Ron McAnally | Sidney H. Craig | 2:04.25 |
| 1998 | Prize Giving | 5 | Alex Solis | Neil D. Drysdale | Antoinette Oppenheimer | 2:04.41 |
| 1997 | Sandpit | 8 | Corey Nakatani | Richard Mandella | Sierra Thoroughbreds | 2:00.61 |
| 1996 | Urgent Request | 6 | Chris Antley | Rodney Rash | Stewart Aitken | 2:02.26 |
| 1995 | River Flyer | 4 | Chris Antley | David Hofmans | Golden Eagle Farm | 2:05.61 |
| 1994 | Bien Bien | 5 | Laffit Pincay Jr. | J. Paco Gonzalez | Trudy McCaffery & John Toffan | 2:00.55 |
| 1993 | Star of Cozzene | 5 | Gary Stevens | Mark A. Hennig | Team Valor et al. | 2:01.71 |
| 1992 | Classic Fame | 6 | Ed Delahoussaye | Gary F. Jones | Classic Thoroughbreds et al. | 1:58.02 |
| 1991 | Fly Till Dawn | 5 | Laffit Pincay Jr. | Darrell Vienna | Josephine T. Gleis | 1:58.60 |
| 1990 | Putting | 7 | Corey Black | Julio C. Canani | Sully's Stable | 1:58.20 |
| 1989 | Trokhos | 6 | Laffit Pincay Jr. | Edwin J. Gregson | Vincent Kanowsky | 2:02.00 |
| 1988 | Great Communicator | 5 | Ray Sibille | Thad Ackel | Class Act Stable (George Ackel) | 2:02.60 |
| 1987 | Zoffany | 7 | Ed Delahoussaye | John Gosden | Anthony & John Bodie, Anthony Speelman | 2:00.80 |
| 1986 | Silveyville | 8 | Chris McCarron | Bruce Headley | Kjell Qvale | 2:00.80 |
| 1985 | Dahar | 4 | Fernando Toro | Charles Whittingham | Summa Stable (Lessee) | 2:01.20 |
| 1984 | Lucence | 5 | Pat Valenzuela | Charles Whittingham | Wimborne Farm (Diane L. Perkins) | 2:01.80 |
| 1983 | Western | 5 | Chris McCarron | Laz Barrera | Aaron U. Jones | 2:04.00 |
| 1982 | Super Moment | 5 | Laffit Pincay Jr. | Ron McAnally | Elmendorf Farm | 2:00.60 |
| 1981 | Galaxy Libra | 5 | Ángel Cordero Jr. | Charles Whittingham | Louis R. Rowan | 2:00.20 |
| 1980 | John Henry | 5 | Darrel McHargue | Ron McAnally | Dotsam Stable | 2:01.60 |
| 1979 | Tiller | 5 | Ángel Cordero Jr. | David A. Whiteley | William Haggin Perry | 1:58.80 |
| 1978 | Vigors | 5 | Darrel McHargue | Larry J. Sterling | William R. Hawn | 1:46.60 |
| 1977 | Royal Derby II | 8 | Bill Shoemaker | Charles Whittingham | Fogelson & Whittingham | 1:58.20 |
| 1976 | Announcer | 4 | Fernando Toro | Vincent Clyne | Elmendorf Farm | 1:58.40 |
| 1975 | Trojan Bronze | 4 | Bill Shoemaker | Charles Whittingham | Adrian B. Roks | 1:59.80 |
| 1974 | Triangular | 7 | Don Pierce | Jim Penney | Pearson's Barn Inc. | 2:04.80 |
| 1973 | Tuqui II | 6 | Laffit Pincay Jr. | Laz Barrera | Bonnie Brae Farm Inc. | 2:02.20 |
| 1972 | Aggressively * | 5 | Don Pierce | John H. Adams | El Peco Ranch | 2:00.60 |
| 1972 | Big Shot II * | 7 | Eddie Belmonte | Pancho Martin | Sigmund Sommer | 1:59.80 |
| 1971 | Cougar II | 5 | Bill Shoemaker | Charles Whittingham | Mary Jones Bradley | 2:02.00 |
| 1969 | Deck Hand | 6 | Don Pierce | Charles Whittingham | Forked Lightning Ranch | 2:05.80 |
| 1968 | Biggs | 8 | Jerry Lambert | Farrell W. Jones | Edward F. Gould | 2:04.40 |
| 1967 | Rehabilitate | 4 | Bill Shoemaker | Robert L. Wheeler | Robert Lehman | 1:59.80 |
| 1966 | Or Et Argent | 5 | Walter Blum | Wayne B. Stucki | C. Campbell | 2:01.60 |
| 1965 | Desert Chief III | 9 | Donald Ross | Dale Landers | E. M. Goemans | 2:01.00 |
| 1964 | Mr. Consistency | 6 | Kenneth Church | James I. Nazworthy | Mrs. Ann Peppers | 2:02.40 |
| 1963 | Rablero | 5 | Johnny Longden | Charles Whittingham | C. R. McCoy | 2:00.40 |
| 1962 | The Axe II | 4 | Robert Yanez | Robert L. Wheeler | Greentree Stable | 2:03.00 |
| 1961 | Anisado | 7 | Ismael Valenzuela | William B. Finnegan | Lewis & El Peco Ranch | 1:59.60 |
| 1960 | Whodunit | 5 | Ralph Neves | William C. Winfrey | Mrs. Jan Burke | 2:01.20 |
| 1959 | Round Table | 5 | Bill Shoemaker | William Molter | Kerr Stables | 1:58.40 |
| 1958 | Ekaba | 4 | Bill Shoemaker | Jerry Wallace | Agoura Stock Farm | 2:01.20 |
| 1957 | Alidon | 6 | Johnny Longden | William Molter | Louis B. Mayer | 2:05.80 |
| 1956 | Bobby Brocato | 5 | George Taniguchi | William Molter | Mr. & Mrs. Travis M. Kerr | 2:03.60 |
| 1955 | Great Captain | 6 | William Boland | George H. Strate | Ogden Phipps | 2:03.80 |
| 1954 | Mark-Ye-Well | 5 | Eddie Arcaro | Horace A. Jones | Calumet Farm | 2:00.20 |
| 1953 | Grover B. | 4 | Eddie Arcaro | Thomas P. Morgan | Thomas P. Morgan | 1:36.80 |
| 1952 | Hill Prince | 5 | Eddie Arcaro | Casey Hayes | Christopher Chenery | 1:35.80 |
