= John Henry (horse) =

American-bred Thoroughbred racehorse

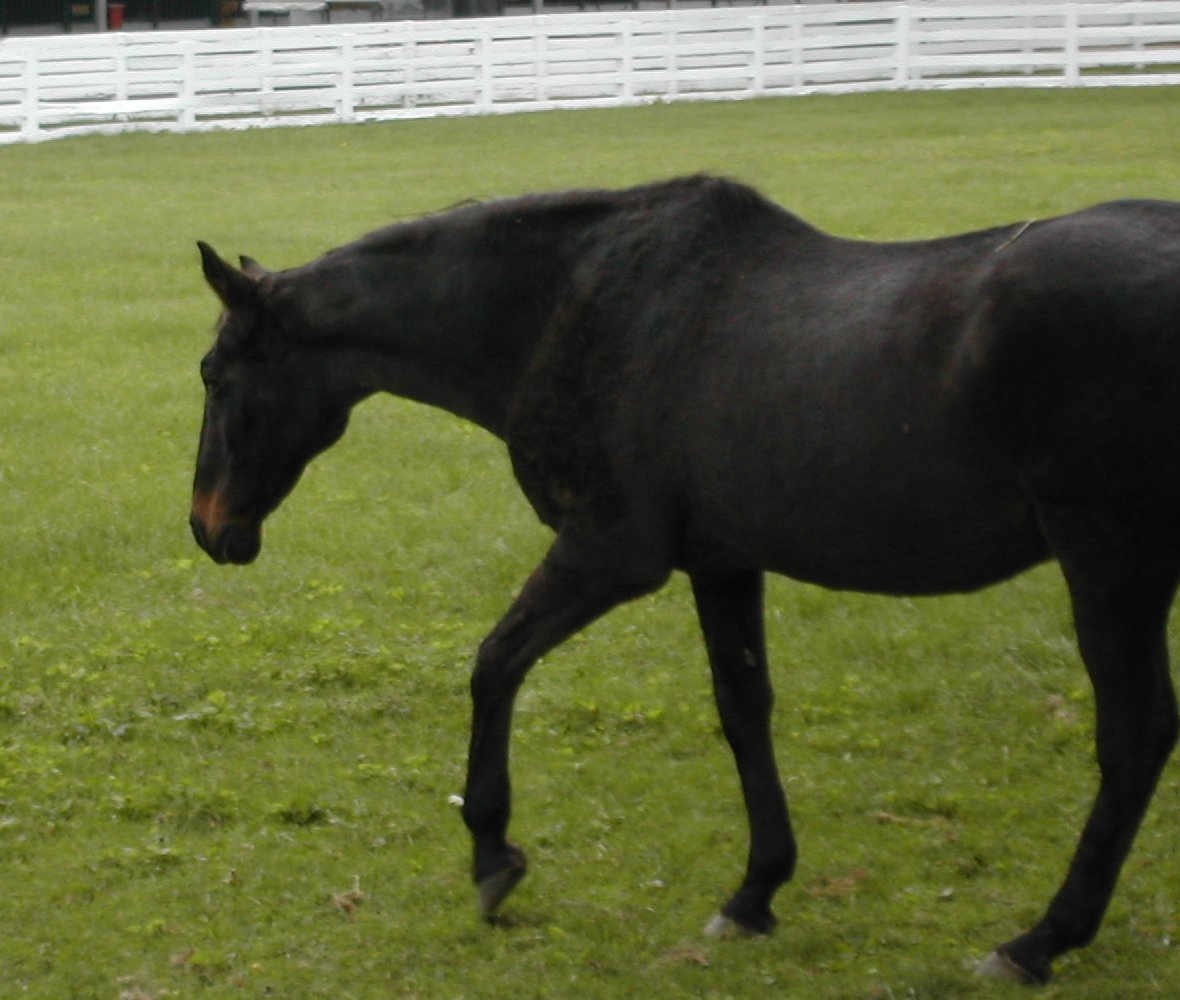
- John Henry at the Kentucky Horse Park in 2006
- Sire: Ole Bob Bowers
- Grandsire: Prince Blessed
- Dam: Once Double
- Damsire: Double Jay
- Sex: Gelding
- Foaled: March 9, 1975; Kentucky
- Died: October 8, 2007
- Country: United States
- Color: Brown
- Breeder: Golden Chance Farm
- Owner: Dotsam Stable. Colors: Brown, powder blue hoop and bar on sleeves, brown and blue cap.
- Trainer: Robert Donato; Lefty Nickerson; Ron McAnally
- Record: 83: 39-15-9
- Earnings: $6,591,860

Major wins
- Round Table Handicap (1978); Hialeah Turf Cup Handicap (1980); San Gabriel Handicap (1980); Oak Tree Turf Championship (1980, 1981, 1982); Hollywood Invitational Handicap (1980, 1981, 1984); San Luis Rey Handicap (1980, 1981); Santa Anita Handicap (1981, 1982); Arlington Million (1981, 1984); Jockey Club Gold Cup (1981); Turf Classic Invitational (1984); Sunset Handicap (1984)

Awards
- U.S. Champion Older Male Horse (1981); 4× U.S. Champion Turf Horse (1980, 1981, 1983, 1984); 2× United States Horse of the Year (1981, 1984)

Honors
- U.S. Racing Hall of Fame (1990) #23 - Top 100 U.S. Racehorses of the 20th Century; John Henry Handicap (1986 - 1994) at Hollywood Park Racetrack; Statue at Arlington Park; Statue at Santa Anita Park
- Last updated on September 17, 2006

John Henry (March 9, 1975 – October 8, 2007) was an American champion Thoroughbred racehorse. He won dozens of stakes races in the United States, most notably the inaugural Arlington Million in 1981 and won it again in 1984.

He was sired by Ole Bob Bowers (by Prince Blessed) out of Once Double (by Double Jay). John Henry had 39 wins with $6,591,860 in earnings, was twice voted the Eclipse Award for Horse of the Year, and was listed as #23 on Blood Horse magazine's Top 100 U.S. Racehorses of the 20th Century.

== Background ==
The horse was named after the folk hero John Henry. As a colt, John Henry had a habit of tearing steel water and feed buckets off stall walls and stomping them flat. This reminded his owners of the legendary John Henry, who was known as a "steel-drivin' man". He was gelded both for his temperament as well as his lack of good breeding, which meant that he would have been unlikely to be in much demand as a breeding stallion. John Henry was a Golden Chance Farm foal. His sire, Ole Bob Bowers, was sired by Prince Blessed and his dam, Once Double, was sired by Double Jay, a graded stakes race winner.

John Henry was back at the knee (a flaw in conformation that generally makes a long racing career unlikely), undersized, and plainly bred. He was sold as a yearling for $1,100 at the Keeneland January Mixed sale to John Callaway who is credited with giving John Henry his name.

== Racing record ==
John Henry had a series of trainers, and earned money in minor stakes, allowance races, and mid-level claiming races. In 1978, New York City businessman Sam Rubin and his wife Dorothy paid $25,000 sight-unseen for the three-year-old John Henry. Racing under the Rubins' Dotsam Stable banner, he was first conditioned by trainer Robert Donato. Under him, John Henry won 6 of 19 starts and $120,000, starting the year as a cheap claimer and getting his first graded stakes win in the Round Table Handicap at Arlington Park.

In 1979, John Henry was given to a new trainer, Lefty Nickerson. Under him, John Henry won 4 of 11 races in 1979. When the grass season was over in New York, Rubin decided to send the horse to California under trainer Ron McAnally. Under McAnally, John Henry won six stakes races in a row.

Racing through the age of nine, John Henry won the 1981 Santa Anita Handicap and repeated in 1982 after Perrault was disqualified. He is one of only three horses with back-to-back victories in the race's 72-year history. He also won the Arlington Million Stakes twice and won three renewals of both the Hollywood Invitational Handicap and the Oak Tree Invitational Stakes, two Grade I turf stakes in Southern California. He won one of America's most important races for older horses, the 1981 Jockey Club Gold Cup at Belmont Park, at 1 1/2 miles (2.4 km) on the dirt. This victory clinched his first Horse of the Year title, and as noted on the CBS telecast of that race (October 10, 1981, https://www.youtube.com/watch?v=DHexkk8Xhl0), becoming the sport's all-time leading money earner.

A bronze statue called Against All Odds, created by Edwin Bogucki, stands on a balcony overlooking the paddock at Arlington Park. It commemorates one of John Henry's most famous finishes; in 1981, at the inaugural Arlington Million, John Henry won over 5-year-old The Bart in a photo finish.

On December 11, 1983, John Henry became the first racehorse to surpass $4 million in career earnings when he won the Hollywood Turf Cup Stakes with jockey Chris McCarron at Hollywood Park Racetrack.

John Henry's last race was the 1984 Ballantine Scotch Classic at the Meadowlands. As he took the lead in the stretch, Meadowlands track announcer Dave Johnson exclaimed, "And down the stretch they come! The old man, John Henry, takes command!" He pulled away to his 39th career victory and his second Horse of the Year title. The final time of 2:13 equaled the track record for 1 3/8 miles (2.2 km).

John Henry was a late entry into the Inaugural Breeders' Cup in 1984 but a strained ligament in his left foreleg caused him to be withdrawn from the race and retired.

John Henry's final race record stood at 83 starts, 39 wins, 15 seconds, and 9 thirds with $6,591,860 in earnings. He was twice voted the Eclipse Award for Horse of the Year in 1981 and 1984; 1981 being the first unanimous election of the winner. That feat was not repeated until 2015 when Triple Crown winner American Pharoah was also elected unanimously.

=== Results ===
Date	Track	Race (Grade)	Distance (Condition)	Finish	Jockey	Winner (Runner-Up)
1977 (2 year old season)
5/20/1977	Jefferson Downs	Maiden Special Weight	D4F (fast)	1st	G. Spiehler	(You Sexy Thing)
6/7/1977	Jefferson Downs	Allowance	D4F (fast)	3rd	G. Spiehler	Dancing Meadow
7/2/1977	Jefferson Downs	Allowance	D5F (sloppy)	2nd	G. Spiehler	Kinda Naughty
7/29/1977	Jefferson Downs	Handicap	D6F (fast)	DNF	L. Munster	Run Like Heck
8/6/1977	Evangeline Downs	Allowance	D5F (sloppy)	1st	A. Guajardo	(Motor Dude)
8/25/1977	Evangeline Downs	Maiden Special Weight	D6F (good)	2nd	A. Guajardo	Note to Mame
9/5/1977	Evangeline Downs	Lafayette Futurity	D6F (sloppy)	1st	A. Guajardo	(Lil' Liza Jayne)
11/19/1977	Fair Grounds	Southern Hospitality Stakes	D6F (fast)	5th	A. Guajardo	Cabrini Green
12/3/1977	Fair Grounds	Allowance	D6F (fast)	4th	J. McKnight	Dragon Tamer
12/17/1977	Fair Grounds	Allowance	D6F (good)	3rd	J. McKnight	Cabrini Green
12/31/1977	Fair Grounds	Sugar Bowl Handicap	D6F (fast)	11th	J. McKnight	Cabrini Green
1978 (3 year old season)
1/23/1978	Fair Grounds	Allowance	D8F (good)	8th	A. Guajardo	Cabrini Green
2/4/1978	Fair Grounds	Allowance	D8F (fast)	5th	A. Guajardo	Hog Town
2/15/1978	Fair Grounds	Claiming	D6F (fast)	6th	A. Guajardo	Mercer County
2/22/1978	Fair Grounds	Claiming	D6F (fast)	10th	D. Elmer	Adriatic Editions
3/22/1978	Fair Grounds	Claiming	D6F (fast)	3rd	D. Copling	Kim's Red
4/11/1978	Keeneland	Allowance	D6F (fast)	4th	J. McKnight	Johnny Blade
5/21/1978	Aqueduct	Claiming	D6F (fast)	1st	A. Santiago	(Please See Me)
6/1/1978	Belmont Park	Claiming	T8.5F (firm)	1st	A. Santiago	(Continental Cousin)
6/25/1978	Belmont Park	Allowance	T8.5F (hard)	1st	A. Santiago	(Turn of Coin)
7/1/1978	Monmouth Park	Lamplighter Handicap (G3)	T8.5F (firm)	3rd	A. Santiago	North Course
7/19/1978	Belmont Park	Hill Prince Handicap	T8F (firm)	2nd	A. Santiago	Darby Creek Road
7/29/1978	Belmont Park	Lexington Handicap (G2)	T8.5F (firm)	2nd	A. Santiago	Mac Diarmida
8/8/1978	Saratoga	Allowance	D7F (good)	5th	A. Santiago	Darby Creek Road
8/18/1978	Saratoga	Allowance	T8.5F (firm)	4th	J. Amy	Blue Baron
9/9/1978	Belmont Park	Allowance	T7F (firm)	1st	J. Amy	(Gab Bag)
9/16/1978	Arlington Park	Round Table Handicap (G2)	T8.5F (good)	1st	J. Amy	(Gordie H.)
10/8/1978	Santa Anita	Volante Handicap (G3)	T9F (firm)	3rd	C. Baltazar	Wayside Station
10/15/1978	Santa Anita	Carleton F. Burke Handicap (G2)	T10F (firm)	6th	C. Baltazar	Star of Erin II
10/29/1978	Penn National	Chocolatetown Handicap	T8.5F (firm)	1st	R. Broussard	(Scythian Gold)
1979 (4 year old season)
5/26/1979	Monmouth Park	Allowance	D6F (fast)	2nd	W. McCauley	Really and Truly
6/5/1979	Monmouth Park	Allowance	D8F (fast)	1st	W. McCauley	(Thou Fool)
6/24/1979	Suffolk Downs	Massachusetts Handicap (G3)	D9F (fast)	10th	D. Borden	Island Sultan
7/6/1979	Atlantic City	Sunrise Handicap	T8.5F (firm)	2nd	W. McCauley	Chati
7/14/1979	Belmont Park	Sword Dancer Stakes	T8.5F (firm)	2nd	A. Santiago	Darby Creek Road
7/29/1979	Penn National	Capital City Handicap	D8.5F (sloppy)	4th	A. Santiago	Horatius
8/22/1979	Saratoga	Allowance	T9F (firm)	1st	A. Santiago	(Told)
9/10/1979	Belmont Park	Allowance	T8.5F (firm)	1st	A. Santiago	(Silent Cal)
10/14/1979	Santa Anita	Carleton F. Burke Handicap (G2)	T10F (firm)	2nd	D. McHargue	Silver Eagle
11/5/1979	Santa Anita	Henry P. Russell Handicap	T9F (firm)	1st	D. McHargue	(Rusty Canyon)
12/8/1979	Bay Meadows	Bay Meadows Handicap	T9F (firm)	2nd	D. McHargue	Leonotis
1980 (5 year old season)
1/1/1980	Santa Anita	San Gabriel Handicap (G3)	T9F (good)	1st	D. McHargue	(Smasher)
1/20/1980	Santa Anita	San Marcos Handicap (G3)	D10F (fast)	1st	D. McHargue	(El Fantastico)
2/23/1980	Hialeah Park	Hialeah Turf Cup Handicap (G2)	T12F (firm)	1st	D. McHargue	(Dancing Master)
3/16/1980	Santa Anita	San Luis Rey Stakes (G1)	T12F (firm)	1st	D. McHargue	(Relaunch)
4/6/1980	Santa Anita	San Juan Capistrano Invitational Handicap (G1)	T14F (firm)	1st	D. McHargue	(Fiestero)
5/26/1980	Hollywood Park	Hollywood Invitational Handicap (G1)	T12F (firm)	1st	D. McHargue	(Balzac)
6/14/1980	Belmont Park	Bowling Green Handicap (G2)	T11F (firm)	2nd	D. McHargue	Sten
7/12/1980	Belmont Park	Sword Dancer Stakes	T12F (firm)	2nd	D. McHargue	Tiller
9/7/1980	Belmont Park	Brighton Beach Handicap (G3)	T10F (firm)	1st	A. Cordero	(Premier Ministre)
10/4/1980	Belmont Park	Jockey Club Gold Cup (G1)	D12F (fast)	2nd	A. Cordero	Temperence Hill
10/25/1980	Aqueduct	Turf Classic (G1)	T12F (soft)	3rd	L. Pincay	Anifa
11/16/1980	Santa Anita	Oak Tree Invitational Stakes (G1)	T12F (firm)	1st	L. Pincay	(Balzac)
1981 (6 year old season)
2/16/1981	Santa Anita	San Luis Obispo Handicap (G2)	T12F (firm)	1st	L. Pincay	(Galaxy Libra)
3/8/1981	Santa Anita	Santa Anita Handicap (G1)	D10F (fast)	1st	L. Pincay	(King Go Go)
3/29/1981	Santa Anita	San Luis Rey Stakes (G1)	T12F (firm)	1st	L. Pincay	(Obraztsovy)
5/17/1981	Hollywood Park	Hollywood Invitational Handicap (G1)	T12F (firm)	1st	L. Pincay	(Caterman)
6/14/1981	Hollywood Park	Hollywood Gold Cup (G1)	D10F (fast)	4th	L. Pincay	Eleven Stitches (Note: Caterman placed first, but was disqualified)
7/11/1981	Belmont Park	Sword Dancer Stakes (G3)	T12F (firm)	1st	W. Shoemaker	(Passing Zone)
8/30/1981	Arlington	Arlington Million Invitational	T10F (soft)	1st	W. Shoemaker	(The Bart)
10/10/1981	Belmont Park	Jockey Club Gold Cup (G1)	D12F (fast)	1st	W. Shoemaker	(Peat Moss)
11/8/1981	Santa Anita	Oak Tree Invitational Stakes (G1)	T12F (firm)	1st	W. Shoemaker	(Spence Bay)
12/6/1981	Hollywood Park	Hollywood Turf Cup	T12F (firm)	4th	W. Shoemaker	Providential
1982 (7 year old season)
3/7/1982	Santa Anita	Santa Anita Handicap (G1)	D10F (fast)	1st	W. Shoemaker	(Perrault) (Note: Perrault finished first, but was disqualified to second)
3/28/1982	Santa Anita	San Luis Rey Stakes (G1)	T12F (firm)	3rd	W. Shoemaker	Perrault
10/17/1982	Santa Anita	Carleton F. Burke Handicap (G2)	T10F (firm)	4th	W. Shoemaker	Mehmet
10/31/1982	Santa Anita	Oak Tree Invitational Handicap (G1)	T12F (firm)	1st	W. Shoemaker	(Craelius)
11/13/1982	Meadowlands	Meadowlands Cup (G2)	D10F (good)	3rd	W. Shoemaker	Mehmet
11/28/1982	Tokyo (JPN)	Japan Cup (G1)	T12F (firm)	13th	W. Shoemaker	Half Iced
1983 (8 year old season)
7/4/1983	Hollywood Park	American Handicap (G2)	T9F (firm)	1st	C. McCarron	(Prince Florimund)
8/28/1983	Arlington	(Budweiser) Arlington Million Invitational (G1)	T10F (good)	2nd	C. McCarron	Tolomeo
10/15/1983	Belmont Park	Jockey Club Gold Cup (G1)	D12F (fast)	5th	C. McCarron	Slew o' Gold
11/13/1983	Santa Anita	Oak Tree Invitational (G1)	T12F (good)	2nd	C. McCarron	Zalataia
12/11/1983	Hollywood Park	Hollywood Turf Cup (G1)	T11F (good)	1st	C. McCarron	(Zalataia)
1984 (9 year old season)
3/4/1984	Santa Anita	Santa Anita Handicap (G1)	D10F (fast)	5th	C. McCarron	Interco
4/1/1984	Santa Anita	San Luis Rey Stakes (G1)	T12F (firm)	3rd	C. McCarron	Interco
5/6/1984	Golden Gate	Golden Gate Handicap (G3)	T11F (firm)	1st	C. McCarron	(Silveyville)
5/28/1984	Hollywood Park	Hollywood Invitational Handicap (G1)	T12F (firm)	1st	C. McCarron	(Galant Vert)
6/24/1984	Hollywood Park	Hollywood Gold Cup (G1)	D10F (fast)	2nd	C. McCarron	Desert Wine
7/23/1984	Hollywood Park	Sunset Handicap (G1)	T12F (firm)	1st	C. McCarron	(Load the Cannons)
8/26/1984	Arlington	(Budweiser) Arlington Million Invitational (G1)	T10F (firm)	1st	C. McCarron	(Royal Heroine)
9/22/1984	Belmont Park	Turf Classic (G1)	T12F (firm)	1st	C. McCarron	(Win)
10/13/1984	Meadowlands	Ballantine's Scotch Classic Handicap	T11F (firm)	1st	C. McCarron	(Who's for Dinner)

== Retirement ==
John Henry's brass nameplate

After retirement, Rubin sent John Henry to the Hall of Champions at Kentucky Horse Park in Lexington. He joined three time Horse of the Year Forego, as well as Standardbred Rambling Willie, and Throroughbreds Rossi Gold and A Letter To Harry. The Hall Of Champions would in time become home to retired Thoroughbred champions Cigar, Da Hoss and Funny Cide.

Regular rider Chris McCarron often described John Henry as very smart, commenting: "I'm just along for the ride." John Henry, in the view of many followers of thoroughbred racing, was one of the best come-from-behind horses (or "closers") in recent history. In The Blood-Horse ranking of the top 100 U.S. thoroughbred champions of the 20th Century, he was ranked #23. John Henry was inducted into the National Museum of Racing and Hall of Fame in Saratoga Springs, New York in 1990.

== Death ==
John Henry's grave at Kentucky Horse Park.

John Henry was euthanized at 7:05 pm EDT (2305 UTC) on October 8, 2007, at the age of 32. He developed serious kidney problems and stopped responding to veterinary treatment, so the decision was made to put him down. He was buried on the night of his death in front of the Hall of Champions at a spot in front of his paddock. A memorial service was held at the park on October 19.

== John Henry's accomplishments ==
- Oldest horse to win Eclipse Award for Horse of the Year - at age 9
- Oldest horse to win a Grade 1 race - at age 9 (tied)
- Only horse to win the Arlington Million (G1) twice - 1981 & 1984
- One of only three horses to win the Santa Anita Handicap (G1) twice - 1981 & 1982
- Won more graded stakes than any other Thoroughbred - 25
- Retired as the world's richest thoroughbred - July 28, 1985
- Inducted into National Museum of Racing and Hall of Fame in 1990
- Raced in 46 graded (G1, G2, G3) races
- Raced on 18 different North American race tracks
- Won inaugural running of the Arlington Million (1981)
- Oldest horse at age 9 to win the Arlington Million (1984)
- Won on 13 different North American Race Tracks

== Pedigree ==
Pedigree of John Henry (USA), brown gelding, 1975
Sire Ole Bob Bowers 1963	Prince Blessed; 1957	Princequillo	Prince Rose
Sire Ole Bob Bowers 1963	Prince Blessed; 1957	Princequillo	Cosquilla
Sire Ole Bob Bowers 1963	Prince Blessed; 1957	Dog Blessed	Bull Dog*
Sire Ole Bob Bowers 1963	Prince Blessed; 1957	Dog Blessed	Blessed Again*
Sire Ole Bob Bowers 1963	Blue Jeans; 1950	Bull Lea	Bull Dog*
Sire Ole Bob Bowers 1963	Blue Jeans; 1950	Bull Lea	Rose Leaves
Sire Ole Bob Bowers 1963	Blue Jeans; 1950	Blue Grass	Blue Larkspur*
Sire Ole Bob Bowers 1963	Blue Jeans; 1950	Blue Grass	Camelot
Dam Once Double 1967	Double Jay; 1944	Balladier	Black Toney
Dam Once Double 1967	Double Jay; 1944	Balladier	Blue Warbler
Dam Once Double 1967	Double Jay; 1944	Broomshot	Whisk Broom
Dam Once Double 1967	Double Jay; 1944	Broomshot	Centre Shot
Dam Once Double 1967	Intent One; 1955	Intent	War Relic
Dam Once Double 1967	Intent One; 1955	Intent	Liz F.
Dam Once Double 1967	Intent One; 1955	Dusty Legs	Mahmoud
Dam Once Double 1967	Intent One; 1955	Dusty Legs	Dustemall

* John Henry was inbred 4S x 4S to the stallion Bull Dog, meaning that he appears fourth generation twice on the sire side of his pedigree.

* John Henry was inbred 5S x 4S to the stallion Blue Larkspur, meaning that he appears fifth generation (via Blessed Again) and fourth generation on the sire side of his pedigree.

== See also ==
- List of racehorses
- List of leading Thoroughbred racehorses
- Repeat winners of horse races
