= Celtic Arms =

French-bred Thoroughbred racehorse

- Sire: Comrade In Arms
- Grandsire: Brigadier Gerard
- Dam: Amour Celtique
- Damsire: Northfields
- Sex: Stallion
- Foaled: 1991
- Country: France
- Colour: Bay
- Breeder: Georges Wegliszewski
- Owner: Jean-Louis Bouchard; Gary A. Tanaka (in USA)
- Trainer: Pascal Bary (France); Rodney Rash (1995, 2/1996); Ben D. A. Cecil (3/1996)
- Record: 21: 5-2-3
- Earnings: $1,097,995

Major wins
- Prix de Condé (1993); Prix Lupin (1994); Prix du Jockey Club (1994); Gulfstream Park Breeders' Cup Turf Stakes (1996); Pan American Handicap (1996)

Celtic Arms (20 January 1991 – 1998) was a French Thoroughbred racehorse who competed successfully in both France and the United States. Bred by Georges Wegliszewski, he was out of the mare Amour Celtique, a daughter of American horse Northfields, winner of the Hawthorne and Louisiana Derbys. His sire was multiple French stakes winner, Comrade In Arms, a son of one of Britain's great runners, Brigadier Gerard.

Purchased by Jean-Louis Bouchard, Celtic Arms was trained in France by Pascal Bary. He made his racing debut as a juvenile with a third-place finish in the Prix Yacowlef at Deauville-La Touques Racecourse. Jockey Dominique Boeuf then rode him to victory in the Prix de Condé, his most important performance of 1993.

As a three-year-old, under jockey Gerald Mosse, Celtic Arms finished third in the 1994 Group One Grand Prix de Paris and won the Group One Prix Lupin at Longchamp Racecourse. Mosse was the jockey for another of the colt's Group One wins in the Prix du Jockey Club at Chantilly Racecourse. Sent to Churchill Downs in Louisville, Kentucky for the 1994 Breeders' Cup Turf, Celtic Arms was part of one of the strongest international fields in the 1½ mile event's history. In a race run in track-record time, he was ridden by Kent Desormeaux and up against winner Tikkanen plus other notable runners such as Fraise, Hatoof, Paradise Creek, Volochine, and Raintrap. Celtic Arms was in the thick of things after a mile and a quarter but then faded from third to finish in tenth place.

After being purchased by Gary A. Tanaka, in 1995 Celtic Arms raced exclusively in the United States. Rodney Rash handled Celtic Arms's conditioning duties with his best results that year a second in the Grade I Caesars International Handicap at Monmouth Park and a third in the Grade 1 Turf Classic Invitational at Belmont Park. Making his second appearance in that year's Breeders Cup Turf, held in 1995 at Belmont Park, under jockey Gary Stevens Celtic Arms started from the far outside in post position thirteen. He was never in contention and finished tenth behind winner, Northern Spur.

In 1996, Celtic Arms won the G-1 Gulfstream Park Breeders' Cup Turf Stakes for what would turn out to be the last win for 36-year-old trainer Rodney Rash, who died from a rare blood disorder a few days later on March 1, 1996. The colt's training was then assumed by Rash's 27-year-old assistant, Ben Cecil, who won the first-ever race of his training career when Celtic Arms captured the G-2 Pan American Handicap in March.

Retired to stud duty, Celtic Arms sired several foals born in 1997 and 1998. He died in an accident in 1998.
