= Flirting Around =

American-bred Thoroughbred racehorse

- Racing Silks of Zenya Yoshida
- Sire: Round Table
- Grandsire: Princequillo
- Dam: Happy Flirt
- Damsire: John's Joy
- Sex: Stallion
- Foaled: 5 February 1971
- Country: United States
- Colour: Bay
- Breeder: John W. Winnett Jr
- Owner: Zenya Yoshida; Mrs A Hausmann
- Trainer: Robert Carver
- Record: 13:7-0-3

Major wins
- Prix du Gros Chêne (1974); Prix de Meautry (1974); Prix de Saint-Georges (1975); King's Stand Stakes (1975)

Awards
- Timeform rating 125 (1974), 134 (1974); Top-rated older horse in Britain (1975); Timeform Best Sprinter (1975)

Flirting Around (5 February 1971–1993) was a Kentucky-bred, French-trained Thoroughbred racehorse and sire. A specialist sprinter, he showed some promise when winning one of his three races as a two-year-old. In the following year he established himself as one of the best sprinters in France, winning four races including the Prix du Gros Chêne, Prix de Meautry. As a four-year-old in 1975 raced only twice, but was rated the best sprinter in Europe after winning the Prix de Saint-Georges on his seasonal debut and then travelling to England to record a five-length victory in the King's Stand Stakes. He was retired immediately after his biggest win and became a successful breeding stallion in South Africa.

== Background ==
Flirting Around was a bay horse standing 15.3½ hands high with no white markings bred in Kentucky by John W. Winnett Jr. He was sired by Round Table a three-time American Turf Champion who was named Horse of the Year in 1958. He became a successful and influential breeding stallion who was named Leading sire in North America in 1972. He also had an impact in Europe, where his successful progeny included Baldric, Apalachee and Artaius. Flirting Around was one of at least seven winners produced by the Kentucky-bred mare Happy Flirt, herself the winners of three minor races. Happy Flirt's dam Saracen Flirt was also the ancestor of the St Leger winner Mutafaweq.

Before he began his racing career he was acquired by the Japanese owner-breeder Zenya Yoshida and sent into training with Robert Carver in France. He was ridden in most of his races by the French jockey Gerard Thiboeuf

== Racing career ==
=== 1973: two-year-old season ===
After winning on his debut over 1200 metres, Flirting Around was moved up in class and distance for the Group Two Critérium de Maisons-Laffitte over 1400 metres in which he finished third of the seven runners behind the six-length winner Wittgenstein. He was then matched against older horses in the Prix de la Forêt over 1400 metres at Longchamp Racecourse on 28 October. Ridden by Thiboeuf he started at odds of 15/1 and finished seventh of the ten runners behind the three-year-old African Sky.

=== 1974: three-year-old season ===
Flirting Around began his three-year-old season in handicap races, finishing unplaced on his debut before winning races over 1300 metres and 1200 metres. On 2 June, the colt started favourite for the Prix du Palais Royal over 1400 metres at Longchamp but finished third of the five runners behind Sincerely and Garzer. Three weeks later, he was brought back in distance for the Group Three Prix du Gros Chêne over 1000 metres at Chantilly Racecourse. He won his first major race by five lengths from Moubariz, with the British-trained favourite Supreme Gift in fourth. On 18 August the colt was moved back up to 1200 metres for the Group Three Prix de Meautry at Deauville Racecourse. Starting the 13/10 favourite he won by half a length from the Irish-trained four-year-old Boone's Cabin. In September he finished third to Bayraan in the Prix de Seine-et-Oise over 1200 metres at Maisons-Laffitte Racecourse. On his final appearance of the season, Flirting Around started the 3/1 second favourite for the Group One Prix de l'Abbaye at Longchamp on 6 October, but finished only fifth of the nine runners behind Moubariz.

=== 1975: four-year-old season ===
The English jockey Lester Piggott took over the ride when Flirting Around made his four-year-old debut in the Prix de Saint-Georges over 1000 metres at Longchamp on 11 May. He started the 17/10 favourite and won by a length from the three-year-old filly Princesse Lee. In June, the colt was sent to England to contest the King's Stand Stakes over five furlongs at Royal Ascot. A week before the race he had been sold for an undisclosed sum to the South African owner-breeder Mrs A Hausmann. Ridden by Yves Saint-Martin he started odds of 9/2 in a field which included Bay Express, Hot Spark (Flying Childers Stakes, Palace House Stakes), Auction Ring (July Stakes, King George Stakes) and Princesse Lee. Flirting Around tracked Bay Express for three and a half furlongs before accelerating into the lead and drawing away to win by five lengths from Hot Spark, Auction Ring and Willy Willy. Timeform described the colt's win as "one of the most impressive we have seen in a weight-for-age sprint".

== Assessment ==
There was no International Classification of European two-year-olds in 1973: the official handicappers of Britain, Ireland and France compiled separate rankings for horses which competed in those countries. In the French Handicap Libre (Free Handicap) Flirting Around was rated 118, fourteen pounds behind the top-rated Mississipian [sic]. In the following year, the independent Timeform organisation gave him a rating of 125, five pounds below their best sprinter Saritamer. In 1975, Flirting Around achieved a peak Timeform rating of 134, three pounds behind their Horse of the Year Grundy, and was named their best sprinter of the year. In the official British handicap, he was allotted a weight of 140 pounds, making him the joint-best older horse of the season, level with Bustino.

== Stud record ==
Flirting Around was retired after his win at Royal Ascot and exported to begin his stud career in South Africa. By far the best of his offspring was Wolf Power the 1984 South African Horse of the Year and the damsire of the two-time American Horse of the Year Wise Dan. Flirting Around died in 1993.

== Sire line tree ==
- Flirting Around
  - Wolf Power
    - Northern Wolf
      - Lous Bucks

== Pedigree ==
Pedigree of Flirting Around (USA), bay stallion, 1971
Sire Round Table (USA) 1954	Princequillo (IRE); 1940	Prince Rose	Rose Prince
Sire Round Table (USA) 1954	Princequillo (IRE); 1940	Prince Rose	Indolence
Sire Round Table (USA) 1954	Princequillo (IRE); 1940	Cosquilla	Papyrus
Sire Round Table (USA) 1954	Princequillo (IRE); 1940	Cosquilla	Quick Thought
Sire Round Table (USA) 1954	Knight's Daughter (GB); 1941	Sir Cosmo	The Boss
Sire Round Table (USA) 1954	Knight's Daughter (GB); 1941	Sir Cosmo	Hayn Ali
Sire Round Table (USA) 1954	Knight's Daughter (GB); 1941	Feola	Friar Marcus
Sire Round Table (USA) 1954	Knight's Daughter (GB); 1941	Feola	Aloe
Dam Happy Flirt (USA) 1958	John's Joy (USA); 1946	Bull Dog	Teddy
Dam Happy Flirt (USA) 1958	John's Joy (USA); 1946	Bull Dog	Plucky Liege
Dam Happy Flirt (USA) 1958	John's Joy (USA); 1946	My Auntie	Busy American
Dam Happy Flirt (USA) 1958	John's Joy (USA); 1946	My Auntie	Babe K.
Dam Happy Flirt (USA) 1958	Saracen Flirt (USA); 1945	Pilate	Friar Rock
Dam Happy Flirt (USA) 1958	Saracen Flirt (USA); 1945	Pilate	Herodias
Dam Happy Flirt (USA) 1958	Saracen Flirt (USA); 1945	Knight's Gal	Bright Knight
Dam Happy Flirt (USA) 1958	Saracen Flirt (USA); 1945	Knight's Gal	Ethel Gray (Family:2-s)
