= John Henry Turf Championship Stakes =

- Class: Grade II
- Location: Santa Anita Park; Arcadia, California, United States
- Inaugurated: 1969
- Race type: Thoroughbred – Flat racing
- Website: www.santaanita.com

Race information
- Distance: 1 1/4 miles (10 furlongs)
- Surface: Turf
- Track: Left-handed
- Qualification: Three-year-olds & Up
- Weight: Base weights with allowances: 4-year-olds and up: 126 lbs. 3-year-olds: 122 lbs.
- Purse: $200,000

The John Henry Turf Championship Stakes (renamed for John Henry who won it three times) is an American Thoroughbred horse race run annually during the Oak Tree Racing Association's Autumn Meeting at Santa Anita Park in Arcadia, California.

It is raced over a distance of one and one-quarter miles on the turf and is one of the final prep races leading to the Breeders' Cup Turf. Once a Grade I event, it is now a Grade II and open to horses three years old and up. It currently offers a purse of $200,000.

Inaugurated as the Oak Tree Stakes in 1969, from 1971 through 1995 it was called the Oak Tree Invitational Stakes, and from 1996 through 1999, the Oak Tree Turf Championship Stakes. From 2000 through 2011 it was called the Clement L. Hirsch Turf Championship Stakes. The race, now named for John Henry, remains at Santa Anita although the Oak Tree Autumn Meeting was held at Hollywood Park until its closure in December, 2013.

From 1969 through 1994 it was raced at a distance of 1 1/2 miles.

In winning the 2008 edition, Red Giant set a world record time of 1:57.16 for 1 1/4 miles on turf.

== Records ==
Time record: (at current 1 1/4 miles distance)

- 1:57.16 – Red Giant (2008)

Most wins:

- 3 – John Henry (1980, 1981, 1982)

Most wins by an owner:

- 3 – Dotsam Stable (1980, 1981, 1982)

Most wins by a jockey:

- 8 – Bill Shoemaker (1971, 1972, 1975, 1976, 1977, 1978, 1981, 1982)

Most wins by a trainer:

- 9 – Charles Whittingham (1970, 1971, 1972, 1974, 1975, 1976, 1978, 1979, 1986)

== Winners ==
Year	Winner	Age	Jockey	Trainer	Owner	Time
2026	Atitlan	5	Umberto Rispoli	Richard E. Mandella	John M. B. O'Connor	1:58.35
2025	Gold Phoenix (IRE)	7	Umberto Rispoli	Philip D'Amato	Agave Racing Stable, Little Red Feather Racing, Sterling Stables LLC, & Marsha Naify	1:58.74
2024	Cabo Spirit	5	Abel Cedillo	George Papaprodromou	Kretz Racing	2:01.26
2023	Balladeer	4	Victor Espinoza	George Papaprodromou	Calvin Nguyen & Joey C. Tran	1:58.94
2022	Masteroffoxhounds	5	Umberto Rispoli	Philip D'Amato	Rockingham Ranch	1:59.79
2021	United	6	Flavien Prat	Richard E. Mandella	LNJ Foxwoods (Larry, Nanci & Jaime Roth)	1:58.41
2020	United	5	Flavien Prat	Richard E. Mandella	LNJ Foxwoods (Larry, Nanci & Jaime Roth)	1:59.17
2019	Cleopatra's Strike	6	Abel Cedillo	Philip D'Amato	Slam Dunk Racing & M. Nentwig	1:58.22
2018	Liam The Charmer	5	Tyler Gaffalione	Michael W. McCarthy	Madaket Stables LLC	1:58.01
2017	Itsinthepost	5	Tyler Baze	Jeff Mullins	Red Baron's Barn LLC	1:58.28
2016	Ashleyluvssugar	5	Gary Stevens	Peter Eurton	Alesia, Bran Jam Stable, Ciaglia Racing	1:58.35
2015	Race not held					
2014	Bright Thought	5	Tyler Baze	Philip D'Amato	Dye and Venneri Racing	1:58.27
2013	Indy Point	5	Gary Stevens	Richard Mandella	GusMay-Fer	1:57:47
2012	Slim Shadey	4	Garrett Gomez	Simon Callaghan	Phil Cunningham	1:59.17
2011	Acclamation	5	Patrick Valenzuela	Don Warren	Old English Rancho	1:59.45
2010‡	Champ Pegasus	4	Joel Rosario	Richard Mandella	Diamond A Racing/Vargas	2:01.21
2009	Presious Passion	6	Elvis Trujillo	Mary Hartmann	Patricia Generazio	1:59.13
2008	Red Giant	4	John Velazquez	Todd Pletcher	Peachtree Stable	1:57.16
2007	Artiste Royal	6	Joe Talamo	Neil D. Drysdale	David & Jill Heerensperger	1:59.89
2006	The Tin Man	8	Victor Espinoza	Richard Mandella	Ralph & Aury Todd	2:00.12
2005	Fourty Niners Son	4	Corey Nakatani	Neil D. Drysdale	Tom Baxter	2:01.17
2004	Star Over The Bay	6	Tyler Baze	Michael R. Mitchell	G Racing & VanBurger et al.	1:58.70
2003	Storming Home	5	Gary Stevens	Neil D. Drysdale	Sheikh Mohammed	2:01.64
2002	The Tin Man	4	Mike E. Smith	Richard Mandella	Ralph & Aury Todd	1:58.93
2001	Senure	5	Alex Solis	Robert J. Frankel	Juddmonte Farms	1:59.47
2000	Mash One	6	David R. Flores	Robert J. Frankel	Amerman Racing / Palumbo	2:00.67
1999	Mash One	5	David R. Flores	Robert J. Frankel	Amerman Racing / Palumbo	1:59.07
1998	Military	4	Corey Nakatani	Wallace Dollase	The Thoroughbred Corp.	2:02.04
1997	Rainbow Dancer	6	Alex Solis	Jenine Sahadi	Evergreen Farm	2:01.94
1996†	Admise	4	Kent Desormeaux	Walter Greenman	Biszantz & Vandeweghe	1:58.48
1995	Northern Spur	4	Chris McCarron	Ron McAnally	Charles J. Cella	2:02.37
1994	Sandpit	5	Corey Nakatani	Richard Mandella	Sierra Thoroughbreds	2:25.12
1993	Kotashaan	5	Kent Desormeaux	Richard Mandella	La Presle Farm	2:25.06
1992	Navarone	4	Pat Valenzuela	Rodney Rash	Robert E. Hibbert	2:24.29
1991	Filago	4	Pat Valenzuela	Robert J. Frankel	Edmund A. Gann	2:23.62
1990	Rial	5	Rafael Meza	A. Pico Perdomo	Enrique Carlos Boelcke	2:23.80
1989	Hawkster	3	Russell Baze	Ron McAnally	M/M J. Shelton Meredith	2:22.80
1988	Nasr El Arab	3	Gary Stevens	André Fabre	Sheikh Mohammed	2:25.20
1987±	Allez Milord	4	Chris McCarron	John Gosden	Gallagher Farm	2:36.20
1986	Estrapade	6	Fernando Toro	Charles Whittingham	Allen E. Paulson	2:26.00
1985	Yashgan	4	Chris McCarron	John Sullivan	Liebau et al.	2:27.20
1984	Both Ends Burning	4	Russell Baze	Neil D. Drysdale	Burdett-Coutts & Nelson	2:25.40
1983	Zalataia	4	Freddy Head	André Fabre	Edith de Gil	2:29.20
1982	John Henry	7	Bill Shoemaker	Ron McAnally	Dotsam Stable	2:24.00
1981	John Henry	6	Bill Shoemaker	Ron McAnally	Dotsam Stable	2:23.40
1980	John Henry	5	Laffit Pincay Jr.	Ron McAnally	Dotsam Stable	2:23.40
1979	Balzac	4	Chris McCarron	Charles Whittingham	Elizabeth A. Keck	2:25.40
1978	Exceller	5	Bill Shoemaker	Charles Whittingham	Nelson Bunker Hunt	2:24.60
1977	Crystal Water	4	Bill Shoemaker	Roger E. Clapp	Connie M. Ring	2:26.40
1976	King Pellinore	4	Bill Shoemaker	Charles Whittingham	Cardiff Stock Farm	2:31.40
1975	Top Command	4	Bill Shoemaker	Charles Whittingham	M/M Quinn Martin & Murty Farm (Duane, Wayne, Robert Murty)	2:26.00
1974	Tallahto	4	Laffit Pincay Jr.	Charles Whittingham	Elizabeth A. Keck	2:25.80
1973	Portentous	3	John Ramirez	Evan S. Jackson	Daniel Schwartz	2:25.60
1972	Cougar II	6	Bill Shoemaker	Charles Whittingham	Mary Jones Bradley	2:27.20
1971	Cougar II	5	Bill Shoemaker	Charles Whittingham	Mary Jones Bradley	2:24.60
1970	Daryl's Joy	4	Johnny Sellers	Charles Whittingham	R. K. C. Goh	2:26.20
1969	Czar Alexander	4	Ángel Cordero Jr.	Angel Penna Sr.	Gustave Ring	2:23.40

± In 1987 the winning time may have been affected because the race was started on the backstretch instead of from its normal hillside position.
† In 1996, Bon Point finished first but was disqualified and set back to fifth place.
‡ In 2010 run at Hollywood Park.
