= Mark-Ye-Well =

American-bred Thoroughbred racehorse

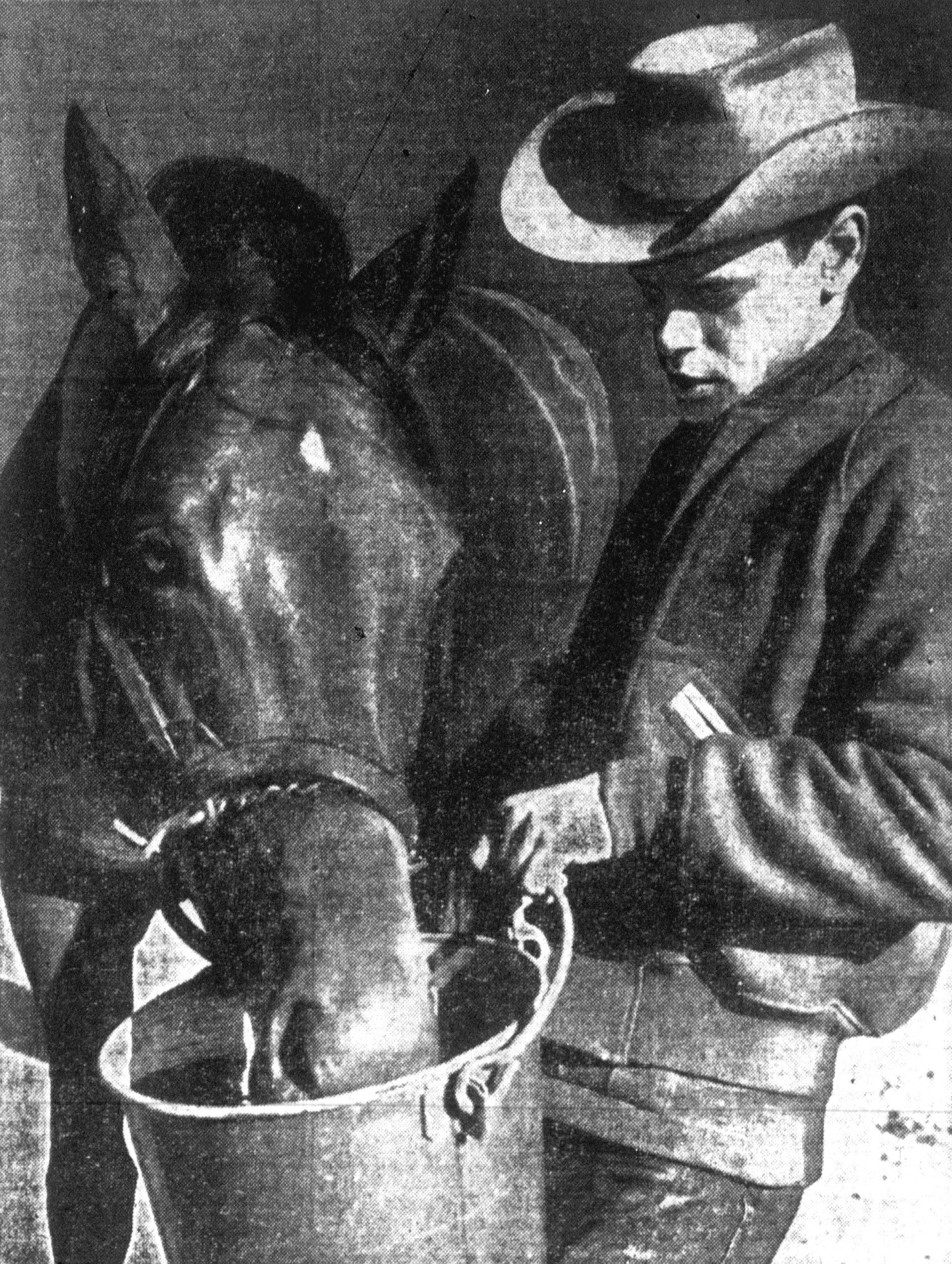
- Mark-Ye-Well in 1953
- Sire: Bull Lea
- Grandsire: Bull Dog
- Dam: Mar-Kell
- Damsire: Blenheim
- Sex: Stallion
- Foaled: 1949
- Country: United States
- Colour: Bay
- Breeder: Calumet Farm
- Owner: Calumet Farms
- Trainer: Ben A. Jones & Horace A. Jones
- Record: 40: 14-2-4
- Earnings: $581,910

Major wins
- Arlington Classic (1952); American Derby (1952); Lawrence Realization Stakes (1952); San Fernando Stakes (1953); Santa Anita Handicap (1953); Santa Anita Maturity (1953); San Antonio Handicap (1954); San Marcos Handicap (1954); Laurance Armour Memorial Handicap (1955); Stars and Stripes Handicap (1955)

Mark-Ye-Well (1949–1970) was an American Thoroughbred racehorse.

== Background ==
Mark-Ye-Well was bred and raced by Calumet Farm. He was sired by their five-time North American Champion Sire, Bull Lea. Mark-Ye-Well was out of Mar-Kell, Calumet's excellent racing mare who was the 1943 American Champion Older Female Horse.

Trained by the father and son team of Ben and Jimmy Jones, Mark-Ye-Well was ridden by Eddie Arcaro in most of his major races.

== Racing career ==
At age two, the colt was taken out of training as a result of a stifle joint problem and did not return to racing until February 1952. Brought back slowly, the then three-year-old colt did not compete in any of the 1952 U.S. Triple Crown races, but by mid-year he had developed into one of the top runners in his age group in the United States. In July, he recorded a five-length win in the Arlington Classic, which was reportedly the most valuable three-year-old race ever run. In the following month, Mark-Ye-Well was described as a "sensation" after he easily won the $103,325 American Derby. The Calumet colt seemed on the way to winning divisional honors at least, but at Belmont in September he was decisively beaten by Tom Fool in the Jerome Handicap. Two weeks later, he beat Belmont Stakes winner One Count by four lengths in the Lawrence Realization Stakes, but One Count was voted American Champion Three-Year-Old Colt after reversing the form in the Jockey Club Gold Cup.

Mark-Ye-Well was sent to race in California in 1953, where he won the Santa Anita Maturity, the San Fernando Stakes, and the state's richest and most important race, the Santa Anita Handicap. His win in the Santa Anita Handicap was the first for Calumet Farm after three previous tries. He then was sent to compete in the Eastern United States but developed a quarter crack that hampered his performance.

Sent back to start the 1954 racing season in California, the five-year-old Mark-Ye-Well won the San Antonio and San Marcos Handicaps. At Chicago's Arlington Park, he won the Stars and Stripes Handicap and the Laurance Armour Memorial Handicap.

== Stud record ==
He was retired to stud duty at Calumet Farm beginning with the 1956 season. Mark-Ye-Well sired only three stakes winners before he was sold to breeders in Scandinavia.
