= Rodney Rash =

Personal information
- Born: July 14, 1959 Frederick, Maryland, U.S.
- Died: March 1, 1996 (aged 36)
- Occupation: Trainer

Horse racing career
- Sport: Horse racing
- Career wins: 143

Major racing wins
- Oak Tree Invitational Stakes (1992); Henry P. Russell Handicap (1993); Providencia Stakes (1993); Malibu Stakes (1994); Sword Dancer Invitational Handicap (1994); Yerba Buena Handicap (1993, 1994); Santa Anita Handicap (1995); Vernon O. Underwood Stakes (1995); San Marcos Stakes (1996); Gulfstream Park Breeders' Cup Turf Stakes (1996)

Significant horses
- Urgent Request, Celtic Arms, Blues Traveller

Rodney R. Rash (July 14, 1959 – March 1, 1996) was an American trainer of Thoroughbred racehorses.

== Early life ==
Born in Frederick, Maryland, Rash grew up on a dairy farm and was exposed to the sights and sounds of Thoroughbred horse racing when he helped his father deliver hay to horse farms and racetracks. Rash left home at age sixteen and found work as a hot walker with the Santa Anita Park racing operations of renowned U.S. Racing Hall of Fame trainer, Charlie Whittingham.

== Assistant to Whittingham ==
During his early working years, Rodney Rash went through a self-destructive wild period when alcohol and drug abuse became a problem. As recounted by Jay Hovdey, author of Charlie Whittingham's biography and an acclaimed racing journalist, Whittingham's son Taylor died as a result of drug abuse and he took Rash under his wing. Associates of Rash also told reporters how Whittingham had been very patient with the young man, bailing him out of jail and making reparations for the damage Rash had done. By 1987, the then twenty-eight-year-old Rash had turned his life around and dedicated himself to his training duties. He worked his way up to become Whittingham's head assistant then in April 1991 opened his own training operation.

== Training career ==
Among his clients, Rodney Rash trained stakes-winning horses for Vistas Stable owned by Motown Records founder, Berry Gordy and for the racing partnership of sportsman Bruce McNall and ice hockey superstar Wayne Gretzky. Another international racehorse owner, American Gary A. Tanaka entrusted Rash with the conditioning of his first horses and credits the young trainer with introducing him to Thoroughbred racing. During his short career as a licensed trainer, Rodney Rash had two horses run in the American Classics, finishing eighth in the 1994 Kentucky Derby and in the Preakness Stakes, an eighth with Honor Grades and ninth with Powis Castle. He also had had four Breeders' Cup starters, but none finished in the money. His most significant win came in 1995 when he won the Santa Anita Handicap with Urgent Request. His last win came with Celtic Arms when he captured the 1996 Gulfstream Park Breeders' Cup Turf Stakes in Florida.

== Death ==
In late February 1996, Rodney Rash was suffering from head aches, fatigue, and symptoms he had attributed to a case of the flu. When his condition became exacerbated, he was taken to Los Angeles Midway Hospital where the thirty-six-year-old died on March 1 from the rare blood disorder, Thrombotic thrombocytopenic purpura. Rodney Rash was survived by his mother, Doris, and two sisters, Susan Scardapane and Rachelle Skinner.
