= American Horse of the Year =

Award for American racehorses

Horse of the Year
- Thoroughbred flat racing
- Country: United States
- Website: Eclipse Award

The American Award for Horse of the Year, or simply Horse of the Year, one of the Eclipse Awards, is the highest honor given in American Thoroughbred horse racing. Because Thoroughbred horse racing in the United States has no governing body to sanction the various awards, "Horse of the Year" is not an official national award.

The Champion award is a designation given to a horse, irrespective of age, whose performance during the racing year was deemed the most outstanding. The list below is a Champion's history compilation beginning with the year 1887 published by the Thoroughbred Owners and Breeders Association's The Blood-Horse magazine (founded 1961), described by ESPN as "the Thoroughbred industry's most-respected trade publication".

In 1936 a Horse of the Year award was created by a poll of the staff of The New York Morning Telegraph and its sister newspaper, the Daily Racing Form (DRF), a tabloid founded in 1894 that was focused on statistical information for bettors. At the same time a rival poll was organised by the Baltimore-based Turf and Sport Digest magazine. Formed in 1942 as an advocacy group, the Thoroughbred Racing Associations (TRA) inaugurated a competing award in 1950, selecting its winners from votes by racing secretaries from member tracks across the United States. The three systems resulted in different opinions as to "Horse of the Year" Champions in 1949, 1952, 1957, 1965, and 1970. In 1971, the DRF and TRA made an agreement with the National Turf Writers Association to merge into one set of awards, called the Eclipse Awards.

== Historical notes on winners ==
In a rare occurrence, two two-year-olds topped the balloting for 1972 American Horse of the Year honors with Secretariat edging out the filly, La Prevoyante. Secretariat received the votes of the Thoroughbred Racing Associations of North America and the Daily Racing Form, while La Prevoyante was chosen by the National Turf Writers Association.

Kelso, who placed 4th in The Blood-Horse magazine ranking of the top 100 U.S. thoroughbred champions of the 20th Century, won "Horse of the Year" honors five consecutive years. Omaha is the only winner of the U.S. Triple Crown that was not voted "Horse of the Year" honors.

== Records ==
Most wins:

- 5 – Kelso (1960, 1961, 1962, 1963, 1964)

Most wins by a trainer:

- 8 – James G. Rowe Sr. (1896, 1900, 1901, 1905, 1907, 1908, 1913, 1915)

Most wins by an owner:

- 6 – Calumet Farm (1941, 1942, 1944, 1947, 1948, 1949)

== Honorees ==
Key
Elected to the Thoroughbred Horse Racing Hall of Fame

=== Eclipse Awards ===
The 2003 Eclipse Awards marked a significant change in the way that honors were decided.

Under this format, voting is conducted by selected members of the National Thoroughbred Racing Association, the Daily Racing Form, and the National Turf Writers and Broadcasters (formerly National Turf Writers Association). The winner of the Eclipse Award for American Horse of the Year is the horse who has received the most first-place votes.

Year	Horse	Trainer	Owner	Age	Sex	Votes (Share)	Runner-Up	Votes (Share)	Ref
2025	Sovereignty	William I. Mott	Godolphin	3	Colt	201/220 (91.36%)	Forever Young	17/220 (7.73%)	
2024	Thorpedo Anna	Kenneth McPeek	Nader Alaali, Mark Edwards, Judy Hicks, and Magdalena Racing	3	Filly	193/240 (80.42%)	Sierra Leone	10/240 (4.17%)	
2023	Cody's Wish	William I. Mott	Godolphin	5	Horse	134/219 (61.19%)	White Abarrio	37/219 (16.89%)	
2022	Flightline	John Sadler	Hronis Racing	4	Colt	239/246 (97.15%)	Malathaat, Life Is Good, Country Grammer	1/246 (0.41%)	
2021	Knicks Go	Brad Cox	Korea Racing Authority	5	Horse	228/235 (97.02%)	Letruska, Loves Only You	2/235 (0.85%)	
2020	Authentic	Bob Baffert	Spendthrift Farm, MyRaceHorse Stable, Madaket Stables, and Starlight Racing	3	Colt	224/238 (94.12%)	Monomoy Girl	7/238 (2.94%)	
2019	Bricks and Mortar	Chad C. Brown	Klaravich Stables and William Lawrence	5	Horse	204/241 (84.65%)	Mitole	19/241 (7.88%)	
2018	Justify	Bob Baffert	China H. C., Head of Plains Partners, Starlight Racing and WinStar Farm	3	Colt	191/249 (76.71%)	Accelerate	54/249 (21.69%)	
2017	Gun Runner	Steve Asmussen	Winchell Thoroughbreds LLC & Three Chimneys Farm	4	Colt	248/250 (99.2%)	Arrogate	2/250 (0.8%)	
2016	California Chrome	Art Sherman	California Chrome LLC	5	Horse	202/248 (81.45%)	Arrogate	40/248 (16.13%)	
2015	American Pharoah	Bob Baffert	Ahmed Zayat	3	Colt	261/261 (100.0%)	N/A	N/A	
2014	California Chrome	Art Sherman	Steven Coburn, Perry Martin	3	Colt	143/265 (53.96%)	Main Sequence	53/265 (20.00%)	
2013	Wise Dan	Charles LoPresti	Morton Fink	6	Gelding	208/249 (83.53%)	Mucho Macho Man	21/249 (8.43%)	
2012	Wise Dan	Charles LoPresti	Morton Fink	5	Gelding	194/254 (76.38%)	I'll Have Another	30/254 (11.81%)	
2011	Havre de Grace	J. Larry Jones	Fox Hill Farms	4	Filly	166/248 (66.94%)	Acclamation	26/248 (10.48%)	
2010	Zenyatta	John Shirreffs	Jerry & Ann Moss	6	Mare	128/238 (53.78%)	Blame	102/238 (42.86%)	
2009	Rachel Alexandra	Steve Asmussen	Stonestreet Stables	3	Filly	130/229 (56.77%)	Zenyatta	99/229 (43.23%)	
2008	Curlin	Steve Asmussen	Stonestreet Farm et al.	4	Colt	153/242 (63.22%)	Zenyatta	69/242 (28.51%)	
2007	Curlin	Steve Asmussen	Stonestreet Farm et al.	3	Colt	249/263 (94.68%)	Rags to Riches	12/263 (4.56%)	
2006	Invasor	Kiaran McLaughlin	Shadwell Racing	4	Colt	228/271 (84.13%)	Barbaro	21/271 (7.75%)	
2005	Saint Liam	Richard E. Dutrow Jr.	M/M William K. Warren Jr.	5	Horse	194/253 (76.68%)	Afleet Alex	56/253 (22.13%)	
2004	Ghostzapper	Robert J. Frankel	Frank Stronach	4	Colt	174/271 (64.21%)	Smarty Jones	95/271 (35.06%)	
2003	Mineshaft	Neil J. Howard	Farish / Webber / Elkins	4	Colt	209/248 (84.27%)	Congaree	11/248 (4.44%)	

The 2002 Eclipse Awards were the last conducted under a voting bloc system, in which each of the three voting groups could only cast a single collective vote based on the polling of that group's members. In the event of an overall split vote, the award would go to the horse who had received the most points - each group's vote awarded ten points for first place, five points for second place, and one point for third place. In the event that there was a tie on points, the award would go to the horse who had received the most individual first-place votes.

Year	Horse	Trainer	Owner	Age	Sex
2002	Azeri	Laura de Seroux	Michael Paulson	4	F
2001	Point Given	Bob Baffert	The Thoroughbred Corp.	3	C
2000	Tiznow	Jay M. Robbins	M. Cooper & Cecilia Straub-Rubens	3	C
1999	Charismatic	D. Wayne Lukas	Bob and Beverly Lewis	3	C
1998	Skip Away	Sonny Hine	Carolyn Hine	5	H
1997	Favorite Trick	Patrick B. Byrne	Joseph LaCombe	2	C
1996	Cigar	William I. Mott	Allen E. Paulson	6	H
1995	Cigar	William I. Mott	Allen E. Paulson	5	H
1994	Holy Bull	Warren A. Croll Jr.	Warren A. Croll Jr.	3	C
1993	Kotashaan	Richard Mandella	La Presle Farm	5	H
1992	A.P. Indy	Neil D. Drysdale	Tomonori Tsurumaki	3	C
1991	Black Tie Affair	Ernie T. Poulos	Jeffrey Sullivan	5	H
1990	Criminal Type	D. Wayne Lukas	Calumet & Jurgen K. Arnemann	5	H
1989	Sunday Silence	Charlie Whittingham	H-G-W Partners	3	C
1988	Alysheba	Jack Van Berg	Dorothy & Pamela Scharbauer	4	C
1987	Ferdinand	Charlie Whittingham	Elizabeth A. Keck	4	C
1986	Lady's Secret	D. Wayne Lukas	Eugene V. Klein	4	F
1985	Spend A Buck	Cam Gambolati	Hunter Farm	3	C
1984	John Henry	Ron McAnally	Dotsam Stable	9	G
1983	All Along	Patrick Biancone	Daniel Wildenstein	4	F
1982	Conquistador Cielo	Woody Stephens	Henryk de Kwiatkowski	3	C
1981	John Henry	Ron McAnally	Dotsam Stable	6	G
1980	Spectacular Bid	Bud Delp	Hawksworth Farm	4	C
1979	Affirmed	Laz Barrera	Harbor View Farm	4	C
1978	Affirmed	Laz Barrera	Harbor View Farm	3	C
1977	Seattle Slew	William H. Turner Jr.	Karen & Mickey Taylor	3	C
1976	Forego	Frank Y. Whiteley Jr.	Lazy F. Ranch	6	G
1975	Forego	Sherrill W. Ward	Lazy F. Ranch	5	G
1974	Forego	Sherrill W. Ward	Lazy F. Ranch	4	G
1973	Secretariat	Lucien Laurin	Meadow Stable	3	C
1972	Secretariat	Lucien Laurin	Meadow Stable	2	C
1971	Ack Ack	Charlie Whittingham	Buddy Fogelson	5	H

=== Daily Racing Form, Turf & Sport Digest and Thoroughbred Racing Association Awards ===
Year	Horse	Trainer	Owner	Age	Gender
1970	Fort Marcy (DRF)	J. Elliott Burch	Rokeby Stables	6	G
1970	Personality (TRA)	John W. Jacobs	Ethel D. Jacobs	3	C
1969	Arts and Letters	J. Elliott Burch	Rokeby Stables	3	C
1968	Dr. Fager	John A. Nerud	Tartan Stable	4	C
1967	Damascus	Frank Y. Whiteley Jr.	Edith W. Bancroft	3	C
1966	Buckpasser	Edward A. Neloy	Ogden Phipps	3	C
1965	Roman Brother (DRF)	Burley Parke	Harbor View Farm	4	G
1965	Moccasin (TRA) (TSD)	Harry Trotsek	Claiborne Farm	2	F
1964	Kelso	Carl Hanford	Bohemia Stable	7	G
1963	Kelso	Carl Hanford	Bohemia Stable	6	G
1962	Kelso	Carl Hanford	Bohemia Stable	5	G
1961	Kelso	Carl Hanford	Bohemia Stable	4	G
1960	Kelso	Carl Hanford	Bohemia Stable	3	G
1959	Sword Dancer	J. Elliott Burch	Brookmeade Stable	3	C
1958	Round Table	William Molter	Kerr Stable	4	C
1957	Dedicate (TRA)	G. Carey Winfrey	Jan Winfrey Burke	5	H
1957	Bold Ruler (DRF) (TSD)	Jim Fitzsimmons	Wheatley Stable	3	C
1956	Swaps	Mesh Tenney	Rex C. Ellsworth	4	C
1955	Nashua	Jim Fitzsimmons	Belair Stud	3	C
1954	Native Dancer	William C. Winfrey	Alfred G. Vanderbilt II	4	C
1953	Tom Fool	John M. Gaver Sr.	Greentree Stable	4	C
1952	Native Dancer (TRA) (TSD)	William C. Winfrey	Alfred G. Vanderbilt II	2	C
1952	One Count (DRF)	Oscar White	Sarah Jeffords	3	C
1951	Counterpoint	Sylvester Veitch	C. V. Whitney	3	C
1950	Hill Prince	Casey Hayes	Christopher Chenery	3	C

=== Daily Racing Form and Turf & Sport Digest Awards ===
Year	Horse	Trainer	Owner	Age	Gender
1949	Capot (DRF)	John M. Gaver Sr.	Greentree Stable	3	C
1949	Coaltown (TSD)	Horace A. Jones	Calumet Farm	4	C
1948	Citation	Ben A. Jones	Calumet Farm	3	C
1947	Armed	Ben A. Jones	Calumet Farm	6	G
1946	Assault	Max Hirsch	King Ranch	3	C
1945	Busher	George M. Odom	Louis B. Mayer	3	F
1944	Twilight Tear	Ben A. Jones	Calumet Farm	3	F
1943	Count Fleet	Don Cameron	Fannie Hertz	3	C
1942	Whirlaway	Ben A. Jones	Calumet Farm	4	C
1941	Whirlaway	Ben A. Jones	Calumet Farm	3	C
1940	Challedon	Louis J. Schaefer	Branncastle Farm	4	C
1939	Challedon	Louis J. Schaefer	Branncastle Farm	3	C
1938	Seabiscuit	Tom Smith	Charles S. Howard	5	H
1937	War Admiral	George Conway	Glen Riddle Farm	3	C
1936	Granville	Jim Fitzsimmons	William Woodward Sr.	3	C

=== The Blood-Horse retrospective champions ===
Year	Horse	Trainer	Owner	Age	Gender
1935	Discovery	Joseph H. Stotler	Alfred G. Vanderbilt II	4	C
1934	Cavalcade	Robert A. Smith	Brookmeade Stable	3	C
1933	Equipoise	Thomas J. Healey	Cornelius Vanderbilt Whitney	5	H
1932	Equipoise	Thomas J. Healey	Cornelius Vanderbilt Whitney	4	C
1931	Twenty Grand	James G. Rowe Jr.	Greentree Stable	3	C
1930	Gallant Fox	Jim Fitzsimmons	Belair Stud	3	C
1929	Blue Larkspur	Herbert J. Thompson	Edward R. Bradley	3	C
1928	Reigh Count	Bert S. Michell	Fannie Hertz	3	C
1927	Chance Play	John I. Smith	Log Cabin Stable	4	C
1926	Crusader	George Conway	Glen Riddle Farm	3	C
1925	Sarazen	Max Hirsch	Virginia Fair Vanderbilt	4	G
1924	Sarazen	Max Hirsch	Virginia Fair Vanderbilt	3	G
1923	Zev	David J. Leary	Rancocas Stable	3	C
1922	Exterminator	Henry McDaniel	Willis Sharpe Kilmer	7	G
1921	Grey Lag	Sam Hildreth	Rancocas Stable	3	C
1920	Man o' War	Louis Feustel	Samuel D. Riddle	3	C
1919	Sir Barton	H. Guy Bedwell	J. K. L. Ross	3	C
1918	Johren	Albert Simons	Harry P. Whitney	3	C
1917	Old Rosebud	Frank D. Weir	Weir & Hamilton Applegate	6	G
1916	Friar Rock	Sam Hildreth	August Belmont Jr.	3	C
1915	Regret	James G. Rowe Sr.	Harry P. Whitney	3	F
1914	Roamer	A. J. Goldsborough	Andrew Miller	3	G
1913	Whisk Broom II	James G. Rowe Sr.	Harry P. Whitney	6	H
1912	The Manager	Thomas C. McDowell	Thomas C. McDowell	3	C
1911	Meridian	Albert Ewing	Richard F. Carman	3	C
1910	Fitz Herbert	Sam Hildreth	Charles Kohler	4	C
1909	Fitz Herbert	Sam Hildreth	Sam Hildreth	3	C
1908	Colin	James G. Rowe Sr.	James R. Keene	3	C
1907	Colin	James G. Rowe Sr.	James R. Keene	2	C
1906	Burgomaster	John W. Rogers	Harry P. Whitney	3	C
1905	Sysonby	James G. Rowe Sr.	James R. Keene	3	C
1904	Beldame	John J. Hyland	August Belmont Jr.	3	F
1903	Hermis	John H. McCormack	Henry M. Ziegler	4	C
1902	Hermis	John H. McCormack	Henry M. Ziegler	3	C
1901	Commando	James G. Rowe Sr.	James R. Keene	3	C
1900	Commando	James G. Rowe Sr.	James R. Keene	2	C
1899	Imp	Charles E. Brossman	Daniel R. Harness	5	M
1898	Hamburg	William Lakeland	Marcus Daly	3	C
1897	Ornament	Charles T. Patterson	Charles T. Patterson	3	C
1896	Requital	James G. Rowe Sr.	Brookdale Farm Stable	3	C
1895	Henry of Navarre	John J. Hyland	August Belmont Jr.	4	C
1894	Henry of Navarre	Byron McClelland	Byron McClelland	3	C
1893	Domino	William Lakeland	James & Foxhall Keene	2	C
1892	Tammany	Matthew Byrnes	Marcus Daly	3	C
1891	Longstreet	Hardy Campbell Jr.	Michael F. Dwyer	5	H
1890	Salvator	Matthew Byrnes	James Ben Ali Haggin	4	C
1889	Salvator	Matthew Byrnes	James Ben Ali Haggin	3	C
1888	Emperor of Norfolk	Robert W. Thomas	E.J. "Lucky" Baldwin	3	C
1887	Hanover	Frank McCabe	Dwyer Brothers Stable	3	C

== See also ==
- List of racehorses
