= Thoroughbred Racing Associations =

Name of an American nonprofit organization

- Industry: Horse racing
- Founded: 1942
- Founder: Alfred Gwynne Vanderbilt Jr.
- Headquarters: Cecil County, Maryland, U.S.
- Website: thoroughbredracingassociations.com

The Thoroughbred Racing Associations of North America, Inc., or simply Thoroughbred Racing Associations (TRA), is the name of an American nonprofit organization which advocates for thoroughbred racing in the United States.

== History ==
The Thoroughbred Racing Associations formed in 1942 as the United States' entry into World War II created a potential halt to horse racing in the country, Alfred G. Vanderbilt Jr. began to develop the formation of a commission of racetracks. At the time, Vanderbilt was the president of Pimlico and Belmont Park. The TRA's first conference was held in Chicago, on March 19, 1942.

In 1946, the Thoroughbred Racing Protective Bureau (TRPB), a subsidiary of the TRA was founded.

In 1971, the TRA established the Eclipse Awards. Equibase, a partnership between subsidiaries of the TRA and the Jockey Club was founded in 1990.

Headquartered in Cecil County, Maryland, the TRA acts as both a governing body and lobbying group.
