= Red Giant (horse) =

American-bred Thoroughbred racehorse (2004–2024)

- Sire: Giant's Causeway
- Grandsire: Storm Cat
- Dam: Beyond The Sun
- Damsire: Kingmambo
- Sex: Stallion
- Foaled: 2004
- Died: April 2024 (aged 20)
- Country: United States
- Colour: Chestnut
- Breeder: Edward & Marilyn Seltzer
- Owner: Peachtree Stable
- Trainer: Todd A. Pletcher
- Record: 12: 6-3-1
- Earnings: $1,092,410

Major wins
- Virginia Derby (2007); Fourstardave Handicap (2008); Clement L. Hirsch Turf Championship Stakes (2008)
- Last updated on September 28, 2008

Red Giant (2004 – April 2024) was an American Thoroughbred racehorse who in September 2008 set a world record for 1¼ miles on turf.

Trained by Todd A. Pletcher, at Colonial Downs in New Kent County, Virginia, Red Giant notably won the July 21, 2007 Virginia Derby in course record time. He suffered an ankle injury in early October that kept him out of racing until August 2008. He returned to win the Fourstardave Handicap on Turf at Saratoga Race Course under jockey John R. Velazquez. He was then sent to Santa Anita Park in California where Velazquez rode him to victory in the Grade I Clement L. Hirsch Turf Championship Stakes in a world record time of 1:57.16 for 1¼ miles on turf. Red Giant died in Turkey in April 2024, at the age of 20.

== Offspring ==
In January 2009, Red Giant was retired from racing to stand at stud at Hill 'n' Dale Farms in Lexington, Kentucky.

The first reported foal for Red Giant was a filly out of Carolyn Frances (by Personal Flag) born on January 30, 2010, at Clear Creek Stud in Louisiana. The second foal was a colt out of Brazilian (by Stravinsky) born on February 2, 2010, at Taylor Made Farm in Nicholasville, Kentucky.

=== Notable stock ===
c = colt, f = filly, g = gelding

Foaled	Name	Sex	Major Wins
2012	Glory Days	f	Auckland Cup
