= Perrault (horse) =

British-bred Thoroughbred racehorse

- Sire: Djakao
- Grandsire: Tanerko
- Dam: Innocent Air
- Damsire: Court Martial
- Sex: Stallion
- Foaled: 1977
- Country: Great Britain
- Colour: Chestnut
- Breeder: Sasse & Sheed
- Owner: Serge Fradkoff & Baron Thierry van Zuylen
- Trainer: Pierre Pelat (France); Charlie Whittingham (USA)
- Record: 22: 9-5-5
- Earnings: $1,494,550

Major wins
- La Coupe (1981); Prix Maurice de Nieuil (1981); Arlington Million (1982); Hollywood Gold Cup (1982); San Luis Rey Handicap (1982); Arcadia Handicap (1982)

Awards
- U.S. Champion Male Turf Horse (1982)
- Last updated on November 28, 2006

Perrault (1977–2001) was a British-bred Champion Thoroughbred racehorse who competed successfully in both France and the United States. A grandson of Tanerko, Perrault's great-grandsire was the French champion Tantieme who won the Prix de l'Arc de Triomphe back-to- back in 1950 and 1951. Racing at age three and four in France, Perrault won five important Conditions races.

Owned by Swiss businessman Serge Fradkoff and the Dutch banker Baron Thierry van Zuylen, a member of the Rothschild family, in 1982 Perrault was sent to race in the United States. Based in California, under U.S. Hall Of Fame trainer Charlie Whittingham, Perrault won several important races including the prestigious Arlington Million and Hollywood Gold Cup. He finished first in the 1982 Santa Anita Handicap but was disqualified to second.

Perrault was considered the leading candidate for U.S. Horse of the Year honors until he injured a tendon while competing in the Marlboro Cup and had to be retired. Nonetheless, his 1982 performances still earned him the Eclipse Award for Outstanding Male Turf Horse.

Syndicated and retired to stud duty, Perrault sired 119 winners before he died in 2001.
