= Round Table (horse) =

American-bred Thoroughbred racehorse

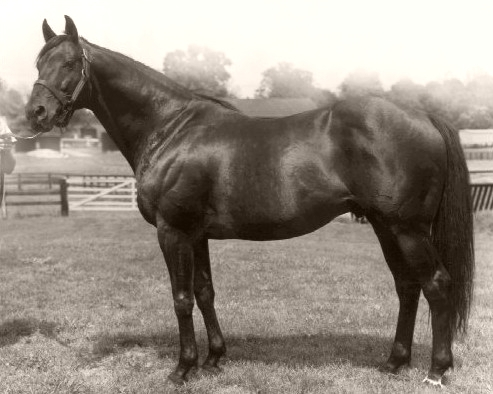
- Sire: Princequillo
- Grandsire: Prince Rose
- Dam: Knight's Daughter
- Damsire: Sir Cosmo
- Sex: Stallion
- Foaled: 6 April 1954
- Died: 13 June 1987 (aged 33)
- Country: United States
- Colour: Bay
- Breeder: Claiborne Farm
- Owner: Claiborne Farm; Kerr Stable
- Trainer: Moody Jolley; William Molter Assistant Trainer Jack Williams
- Rider: Bill Hartack W Shoemaker
- Record: 66: 43-8-5
- Earnings: $1,749,869

Major wins
- Breeders' Futurity Stakes (1956); Blue Grass Stakes (1957); Hollywood Gold Cup (1957); American Derby (1957); Cinema Handicap (1957); Westerner Stakes (1957); United Nations Handicap (1957, 1959); Hawthorne Gold Cup Handicap (1957, 1958); Argonaut Handicap (1958); Strub Series (1958); San Antonio Handicap (1958); Santa Anita Handicap (1958); Agua Caliente Handicap (1958); Gulfstream Park Handicap (1958); Arlington Handicap (1958, 1959); San Marcos Handicap (1959); Arlington Citation Handicap (1959); Stars and Stripes Handicap (1959); Manhattan Handicap (1959)

Awards
- U.S. Champion Turf Horse (1957, 1958, 1959); U.S. Champion Male Handicap Horse (1958); TRA U.S. Champion Male Handicap Horse (1959); American Horse of the Year (1958); Leading sire in North America (1972)

Honours
- United States Racing Hall of Fame inductee (1972) #17 - Top 100 U.S. Racehorses of the 20th Century; Round Table Stakes at Arlington Park

Round Table (April 6, 1954 – June 13, 1987) was an American Thoroughbred Hall of Fame racehorse. He is considered the greatest turf horse in American racing history.

== Background ==
Round Table was foaled at Claiborne Farm in Kentucky, on the night of April 6, 1954. Bold Ruler was foaled at the same farm, on the same night, and both stallions won American Horse of the Year honors in their respective careers, returning to Claiborne to stand at stud. He was trained by Moody Jolley.

== Racing career ==
Round Table's most significant win as a two-year-old came in October 1956, when he won the Breeders' Futurity Stakes at Keeneland Race Course. On February 9, 1957, Claiborne Farm owner Arthur B. Hancock Jr. sold Round Table after his second start of the three-year-old season to Oklahoma oilman Travis M. Kerr. The sale agreement included Round Table standing at stud at Claiborne when his racing career was over with Claiborne receiving twenty percent of his breeding income.

Racing at age three, with Kerr having hired William Molter as his trainer, and Jack Williams as assistant trainer, Round Table won the Blue Grass Stakes at Keeneland in track-record time. He then finished third to Calumet Farm's Iron Liege in the Kentucky Derby, with the heavily favored Bold Ruler finishing 4th. After the Derby, Round Table was shipped back to race in California and started a winning streak of eleven races, including the Hollywood Gold Cup and United Nations Handicap which later became Grade I stakes races. He was the leading money winner of 1957 and won the first of his three straight U.S. Champion Turf Horse titles.

In 1958, Round Table dominated American Thoroughbred racing. He began the year by capturing the races that are now known as the Strub Series at Santa Anita Park, becoming the first horse to win the Malibu Stakes, the San Fernando Stakes, and the Santa Anita Maturity, now the Strub Stakes. He ended the season as the winner of every racing award available to him, including Horse of the Year.

Five years old in 1959, he won 9 of his 14 races and his third Champion Turf Horse title. In the January 24, 1959 San Marcos Handicap race on turf, Round Table carried 132 pounds when he broke the Santa Anita Park course and United States record with a time of 1:58 2/5 for a mile and one-quarter on turf. It marked the fifth time in his career that he had run a mile and one-quarter under two minutes. No other horse in history had run that distance in under the two-minute mark more than twice.

Round Table's lifetime earnings were $1,749,869, and he was the third American Thoroughbred to earn more than a million dollars, after Citation and Nashua. Of his 66 starts, he won 43, placed in 8, and showed in 5, and he set or equaled 14 track records, including one world record and two U.S. records.

== Stud record ==
Retired at the end of the 1959 racing season to stand at stud at Claiborne Farm, Round Table was the leading sire in North America in 1972. He sired 83 stakes winners including He's A Smoothie, Baldric, Apalachee, Artaius, Cellini, Advocator, Flirting Around, King's Bishop, and Poker, who was the damsire of two Hall of Fame inductees, Seattle Slew and Silver Charm. His daughter Isolt was the dam of Sir Tristram whose progeny earned him 17 official Leading Australasian sire premierships, plus nine broodmare sire titles.

Among his descendants are Horse of the Year winners A.P. Indy and Mineshaft. His worldwide reputation both in racing and as a sire was so great that when Queen Elizabeth II visited Kentucky in 1984, she asked to see the 30-year-old horse. Her father, King George VI, bred Round Table's dam, Knight's Daughter.

Round Table died at the age of 33 on June 13, 1987. He is buried in the equine cemetery at Claiborne Farm.

== Sire line tree ==
- Round Table
  - Baldric
    - Without Fear
    - Irish Ball
    - Kyoei Promise
  - Duel
  - Advocator
  - He's A Smoothie
  - Poker
  - Table Play
    - Telescopio
  - Dignitas
  - King's Bishop
  - Upper Case
  - Royal Glint
  - Targowice
    - McAdam
    - Prince Mab
    - Tipperary Fixer
    - Let's Go Tarquin
  - Apalachee
    - High Counsel
    - K One King
      - Halel
  - Cellini
  - Flirting Around
    - Wolf Power
      - Northern Wolf
        - Lous Bucks
  - King Pellinore
  - Easy Gallop
    - Uncle Merlin
  - Take Your Place
  - Artaius
    - Osumi Roch
  - Banquet Table

== Pedigree ==
Pedigree of Round Table, bay horse, foaled April 6, 1954
Sire Princequillo	Prince Rose (GB)	Rose Prince (FR)	Prince Palatine
Sire Princequillo	Prince Rose (GB)	Rose Prince (FR)	Eglantine (FR)
Sire Princequillo	Prince Rose (GB)	Indolence (GB)	Gay Crusader (GB)
Sire Princequillo	Prince Rose (GB)	Indolence (GB)	Barrier (GB)
Sire Princequillo	Cosquilla	Papyrus	Tracery
Sire Princequillo	Cosquilla	Papyrus	Miss Matty (GB)
Sire Princequillo	Cosquilla	Quick Thought (GB)	White Eagle (GB)
Sire Princequillo	Cosquilla	Quick Thought (GB)	Mindful (GB)
Dam Knight's Daughter	Sir Cosmo (IRE)	The Boss (IRE)	Orby (GB)
Dam Knight's Daughter	Sir Cosmo (IRE)	The Boss (IRE)	Southern Cross (AUS)
Dam Knight's Daughter	Sir Cosmo (IRE)	Ayn Hli	Desmond (GB)
Dam Knight's Daughter	Sir Cosmo (IRE)	Ayn Hli	Lalla Rookh
Dam Knight's Daughter	Feola (GB)	Friar Marcus (GB)	Cicero (GB)
Dam Knight's Daughter	Feola (GB)	Friar Marcus (GB)	Prim Nun (GB)
Dam Knight's Daughter	Feola (GB)	Aloe (GB)	Son-in-Law (GB)
Dam Knight's Daughter	Feola (GB)	Aloe (GB)	Alope (GB) (family 2-f)

== See also ==
- List of racehorses
