= Travis M. Kerr =

American businessman

Travis Kerr
- Born: July 28, 1902; Oklahoma, U.S.
- Died: July 7, 1970 (aged 67); Beverly Hills, California, U.S.
- Resting place: Rose Hill Burial Park; Oklahoma City, Oklahoma
- Occupations: Businessman, Racehorse owner/breeder
- Spouse: Nancy Kerr
- Children: 1
- Relatives: Robert S. Kerr (brother)

Travis M. Kerr (July 28, 1902 – June 7, 1970) was an American businessman in Oklahoma City and owned thoroughbred racehorses. Involved in the oil and uranium business, he was the younger brother of Oklahoma businessman and Senator, Robert S. Kerr.

== Kerr Stable ==
Travis Kerr, along with his wife and daughter, owned Kerr Stable. Among the successful horses they raced were Santa Anita Handicap winner Bobby Brocato, San Luis Obispo Handicap winner Quilche, and the most famous of all, Round Table. A colt purchased as a three-year-old in 1957 for $175,000 from Claiborne Farm, Round Table was a U.S. Racing Hall of Fame inductee who retired at the end of the 1959 racing season having earned a world record US$1,749,869. Round Table was voted the 1958 American Horse of the Year, the American Champion Turf Horse of 1957, 1958, and 1959, and the American Champion Older Male Horse in 1958 and 1959. Travis Kerr also bred Ole Bob Bowers, sire of the legendary John Henry.

Travis Kerr died of a cerebral hemorrhage at age 67 in 1970 at his home in Beverly Hills, California.

== Sources ==
- Jun 8, 1970 "Los Angeles Times article titled: Travis Kerr, Round Table's Owner, Dies"
