= Dotsam Stable =

Dotsam Stable was an American Thoroughbred racing stable owned by New York City businessman Sam Rubin and his wife Dorothy.

Sam Rubin (February 23, 1914- February 13, 2006) was a successful bicycle importer and a fan of Thoroughbred horse racing. In 1978 he and wife Dorothy paid $25,000 sight unseen for a then three-year-old gelding named John Henry. The temperamental horse had previously had three different owners, none of whom had achieved any success with him on the racetrack.

Racing under the Rubin's nom de course Dotsam Stable, John Henry became one of the most successful Thoroughbreds in American flat racing history. He won seven Eclipse Awards including two for American Horse of the Year, retired with career earnings of $6,591,860, and was inducted in the U.S. Racing Hall of Fame in 1990.

In 1981, the New York Turf Writers Association honored Sam Rubin as the "Person Who Did Most for Racing" and as racing's "Outstanding Owner." That same year, Dotsam Stable was voted the Eclipse Award for Outstanding Owner.

John Henry was retired to the Kentucky Horse Park in Lexington, Kentucky and the Rubins have donated his trophies to the horse park.

Sam Rubin died in 2006 in Palm Beach, Florida, ten days short of his ninety-second birthday.
