= Gainsborough (horse) =

British-bred Thoroughbred racehorse

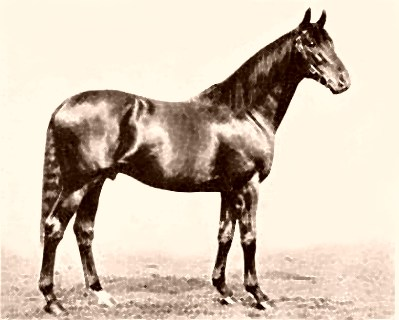
- Sire: Bayardo
- Grandsire: Bay Ronald
- Dam: Rosedrop
- Damsire: St. Frusquin
- Sex: Stallion
- Foaled: 24 January 1915
- Died: 1945 (aged 29–30)
- Country: United Kingdom of Great Britain and Ireland
- Colour: Bay
- Breeder: Lady James Douglas
- Owner: Lady James Douglas
- Trainer: Alec Taylor, Jr.
- Record: 9: 5–1–1
- Earnings: £14,080

Major wins
- Autumn Stakes (1917); 2,000 Guineas (1918); Epsom Derby (1918); St. Leger Stakes (1918); Ascot Gold Cup (1918)

Awards
- 13th U.K. Triple Crown Champion (1918); Leading sire in Britain & Ireland (1932, 1933); Leading broodmare sire in Britain & Ireland (1931)
- Last updated on 17 October 2009

Gainsborough (1915–1945) was a British bred Thoroughbred racehorse who won the English Triple Crown in 1918 and became a superior sire.

== Background ==
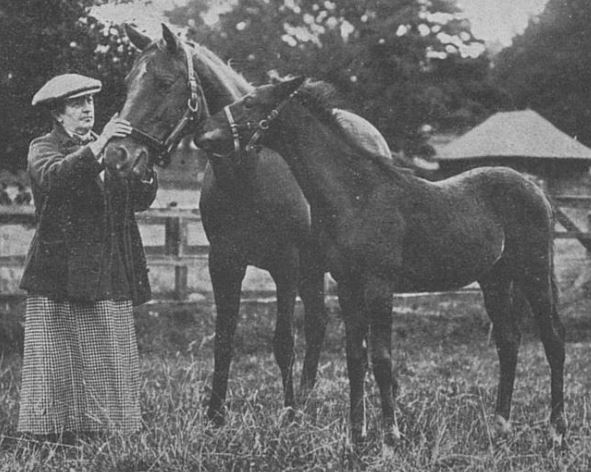
Lady James Douglas bred Gainsborough.

Gainsborough was a bay horse bred by his owner Lady James Douglas (1854–1941). The colt was named after the town of Gainsborough, Lincolnshire because his owner liked the sound of the name. Gainsborough was sired by Bayardo, who also sired the 1917 Triple Crown winner, Gay Crusader, and was out of Rosedrop, who won the 1910 Epsom Oaks and £9,809. Gainsborough's damsire was St. Frusquin, who won nine races including the 1896 2,000 Guineas and £33,960. Galopin was duplicated in the third and fourth generations of Gainsborough's pedigree. He was not a big horse but possessed very good conformation and a kind temperament. One commentator described him as a "horse that would stand a campaign on the Western Front with Sir Douglas Haig on his back." Gainsborough was quite mature when he was offered at the yearling sales but did not reach the reserve that was placed on his price.

Lady Douglas sent Gainsborough to trainer Alec Taylor, Jr.'s training centre in Manton, Wiltshire, to prepare for racing.

== Racing record ==
=== 1917: two-year-old season ===
As a two-year-old, Gainsborough made three starts at the Newmarket Racecourse, won the Autumn Stakes by two lengths, and was rated the third best juvenile of his generation.

=== 1918: three-year-old season ===
Gainsborough won the 2,000 Guineas, marking the first time that a horse bred by a woman won one of the British Classic Races and the first time a Classic winner carried a woman's colours. He was ridden by jockey Joe Childs, who, to help the War effort, donated his winnings to his 4th Hussars regiment to which he was attached.

Following his win in the 2,000 Guineas, Gainsborough won the most prestigious race in England, The Derby, which was run at Newmarket owing to wartime restrictions. He then won the Gold Cup against older horses at a distance of just over two miles (3,219 metres) and in autumn won the September Stakes—a substitute race for the Doncaster St. Leger Stakes—by three lengths over a field including the Oaks winner My Dear and Prince Chimay to become the 13th U.K. Triple Crown Champion in history. Gainsborough finished second to Prince Chimay in the Jockey Club Stakes, after which he was retired.

== Stud record ==
In 1920, Gainsborough was retired to Lady Douglas's newly established Harwood Stud horse breeding operation in northern Hampshire at Woolton Hill, near Newbury, Berkshire.

He had a notable stud career, becoming the leading sire in Great Britain & Ireland in 1932 and 1933. A breeding source for great stamina, he was the sire of a number of Classic Race winners including:

- Hyperion – won the 1933 Epsom Derby and St Leger Stakes and was a champion sire six times.
- Solario – winner of the 1925 St. Leger Stakes and the 1926 Ascot Gold Cup who was 1937's leading sire in England
- Singapore – won the 1930 St Leger Stakes
- Orwell – won the 1932 2,000 Guineas and £29,251.

Gainsborough's daughters did not distinguish themselves on the track but were good broodmares, including:

- Gainsborough Lass was his best race mare, running third in the 1,000 Guineas and winning £7,984.
- Mah Iran, the dam of Migoli, who won £22,950.
- Mah Mahal, the dam of Mahmoud, who won the 1936 Epsom Derby and was the Leading sire in North America in 1946
- Una Cameron – dam of 1931 2,000 Guineas and Derby winner Cameronian
- Painted Vale – dam of 1949 1,000 Guineas and Epsom Oaks winner Musidora and Valerullah

== Ownership change ==
In 1940, failing health forced Lady James Douglas to sell her Harwood Stud, including Gainsborough. Under an agreement with new owner Herbert Blagrave, Gainsborough remained there until his death in 1945. He is buried on the 120-acre (0.49 km^{2}) Harwood property that was eventually renamed Gainsborough Stud in his honour and since 1981 has operated as Gainsborough Stud Management Ltd. under the ownership of Sheikh Maktoum bin Rashid Al Maktoum.

== Assessment ==
In their book A Century of Champions, John Randall and Tony Morris placed Gainsborough at number 56 in a list of the world's 200 best horses of the 20th century.

== Sire line tree ==
Descendants of Gainsborough (click to show)
- Gainsborough
  - Murillo
  - Solario
    - Dastur
      - Dhoti
        - Royal Gem
      - Gold Nib
      - Umiddad
      - Darbhanga
      - Princes Game
        - Welton Gameful
    - Tai-Yang
    - Raeburn
    - Sind
      - Pierot
    - Mid-day Sun
      - Alonzo
        - Rising Fast
      - Sterope
    - Foroughi
    - Sadri
    - King's Approach
      - Royal Approach
    - Nicolaus
      - Nicolaus Silver
    - Shapoor
      - Battle Burn
        - Boomerang
    - Straight Deal
      - Aldborough
      - Royal Highway
      - Honour Bound
        - Tied Cottage
  - Tournesol
    - Isao
    - Wakataka
    - Osis
    - Tsukitoki
    - Tsukiyasu
    - Dynamo
    - Iwa Kabuto
    - Tokumasa
    - Adzuma Dake
    - Kyokujitsu
    - Kumohata
      - Katsufuji
        - Ginyoku
      - New Ford
      - Hatakaze
        - Topaz
        - Yousei
        - Hata Noboru
      - Mitsuhata
        - Kinryu
        - Taro
        - Grace Diver
      - Kiyo Strong
      - Koran
      - Yoshi Minori
      - Hiya Kiogan
      - Meiji Honore
      - Meiji Hikari
        - Kikuno Hikari
        - Osachi
          - Iron Heart
      - Kanehata
      - Toshiwaka
      - Hataryu
    - Tokino Chikara
      - Clack Soul
      - Captain O
      - Tokidenko
      - Ken Chikara
    - Ieryu
    - Kuretake
      - Sachifusa
    - Kuri Yamato
  - Artist Glow
  - Sir Nigel
    - Sirlan
      - Bouzoulou
      - Vulgan
        - Team Spirit
        - Foinavon
        - Vulpine
        - Gay Trip
        - The Dikler
        - Colebridge
    - Sir Fellah
      - Sidere
  - Artist's Proof
    - Fine Art
      - Fine Top
        - Cousin Pons
        - Sanctus
        - Topyo
  - Costaki Pasha
  - Le Voleur
  - Lansdowne
    - Land's Corner
  - Ramses II
    - Red Rower
  - Singapore
    - Chulmleigh
      - Whiteway
    - Skoiter
      - Sunsalve
    - Arco
      - Scanno
        - Rivisondoli
      - Scai
  - Goyescas
  - Orwell
    - Rosewell
      - Distel
      - Linwell
  - Bobsleigh
    - Oxo
  - Emborough
    - Bernborough
      - Bernwood
      - Brush Burn
      - High Scud
      - Berseem
      - First Aid
      - Hook Money
      - Larrikin
      - Resolved
      - Piano Jim
      - Catapult
  - Artist's Son
    - Durlas Eile
  - Winterhalter
  - Hyperion
    - Half Crown
      - Haffaday
    - Admiral's Walk
    - Casanova
      - Golden Surprise
        - Cornishman
    - Heliopolis
      - Marine Victory
      - Ace Admiral
        - Ace Marine
        - Inside Tract
        - Frosty Admiral
      - Olympia
        - Decathlon
        - Air Pilot
        - Greek Game
        - Lucky Mel
        - Alhambra
        - Talent Show
        - Winonly
        - Editorialist
        - Pia Star
        - Creme dela Creme
        - Top Bid
      - Greek Ship
      - Greek Song
        - Greek Money
      - Charlie McAdam
        - Dhaulagiri
      - Helioscope
      - High Gun
      - Summer Tan
        - Sunrise County
      - Rose Trellis
      - Grey Eagle
        - Little Bit
      - Globemaster
    - His Highness
      - Perhapsburg
        - Lucius
    - Hypnotist
    - Quick Ray
    - Helios
      - Wodalla
    - Hippius
    - Stardust
      - Stalino
        - Three Cheers
      - Bright News
        - Casmiri
      - Star Kingdom
        - Kingster
        - Star Realm
        - Gold Stakes
        - Todman
        - Mighty Kingdom
        - Skyline
        - Fine and Dandy
        - Noholme
        - Royal Artist
        - Secret Kingdom
        - Sky High
        - Columbia Star
        - Shifnal
        - Sunset Hue
        - Time And Tide
        - Faringdon
        - Star Of Heaven
        - King Star
        - Star Affair
        - Biscay
        - Kaoru Star
        - Rajah
        - Coalcliff
        - Osmunda
        - Planet Kingdom
        - Red God
        - Tattenham
      - Gala Performance
        - Gala Crest
    - Alibhai
      - Cover Up
      - On Trust
        - Trackmaster
      - Solidarity
      - Your Host
        - Blen Host
        - Social Climber
        - Kelso
        - Windy Sands
      - My Host
      - Chevation
      - Determine
        - Warfare
        - Decidedly
        - Donut King
      - Bardstown
      - Honeys Alibi
      - Traffic Judge
        - Green Ticket
        - Delta Judge
        - Traffic
        - Traffic Bridge
        - Court Recess
        - Traffic Mark
        - Judgeable
        - Rest Your Case
        - Traffic Cop
        - Court Ruling
      - Sharpsburg
      - Oligarchy
      - Mr Consistency
    - Devonian
      - Herring Gull
    - Orthodox
    - Owen Tudor
      - Tudor Minstrel
        - Buckhound
        - King Of The Tudors
        - Poona
        - Will Somers
        - Sallymount
        - Tomy Lee
        - Tudor Melody
        - Sing Sing
      - Abernant
        - Thin Ice
        - Aberli
        - Welsh Rake
        - Abgar
        - Zahedan
      - Eplenor
      - Tudor Era
      - Right Royal
        - Salvo
        - Ruysdael
        - Rangong
        - In The Purple
        - Prince Regent
        - Politico
        - Kambalda
        - Irish
    - Selim Hassan
      - Cid
      - Chispeado
      - Yatasto
        - Yata Nahuel
    - Sol Oriens
    - Sun Castle
    - Hyacinthus
    - Hyperides
    - Sun King
      - Sundew
    - Deimos
    - Coastal Traffic
      - Buisson d'Or
        - Pot d'Or
    - Pensive
      - Ponder
        - Needles
      - Theory
      - Cyclotron
        - Barnaby's Bluff
    - Red Mars
    - Rockafella
      - Rockavon
    - Ruthless
    - Greek Star
      - Anglo
    - High Peak
    - Aldis Lamp
    - Gulf Stream
      - Manganga
      - Gulf Weed
      - Pipote
      - Anisado
      - Manantial
      - Mamboreta
      - Montparnasse
      - Riesgo
    - Khaled
      - Dulac
      - Big Noise
      - Correspondent
        - Sherluck
      - El Drag
      - Hillary
      - Swaps
        - Chateaugay
        - No Robbery
        - Eurasian
        - Laramie Trail
      - Terrang
        - Terlago
      - California Kid
      - Khalex
        - Albany
      - Linmold
      - New Policy
        - Reb's Policy
      - Physician
      - Going Abroad
      - Corn Off The Cob
    - Radiotherapy
    - Sky High
      - Pas de Quatre
        - Huron
    - Empyrean
    - Hyperbole
    - Babu's Pet
    - Rolled Gold
    - Aristophanes
      - Atlas
      - Booz
      - Forli
        - Home Guard
        - Forego
        - Thatch
        - Forceten
        - Intrepid Hero
        - Fordham
        - Formidable
        - Key To Content
        - Posse
        - Sadeem
      - Dorileo
      - Frari
    - Hylander
    - Judicate
    - Aureole
      - St Crespin
        - St Columbus
        - Whispin
      - St Paddy
        - St Puckle
        - Connaught
        - Jupiter Island
      - Vienna
        - Vaguely Noble
      - Aurelius
      - Miralgo
        - Roll Of Honour
      - Silver Cloud
        - Silver Buck
      - Provoke
      - Hermes
        - Van der Hum
    - Gun Shot
      - Gun Bow
    - High Veldt
    - Hornbeam
      - Claude
        - Cerreto
      - Intermezzo
        - Green Grass
    - Ommeyad
    - High Hat
      - High Line
    - Zenith

== See also ==
- List of racehorses
