= Be My Native =

American-bred Thoroughbred racehorse

- Sire: Our Native
- Grandsire: Exclusive Native
- Dam: Witchy Woman
- Damsire: Strate Stuff
- Sex: Stallion
- Foaled: 16 February 1979
- Country: United States
- Colour: Brown
- Breeder: Rowland W. Hancock
- Owner: K Hsu
- Trainer: Robert Armstrong
- Record: 21: 3-4-4

Major wins
- Prix La Force (1982); Coronation Cup (1983)

Awards
- Timeform rating 115 (1981), 121 (1982), 122 (1983)

Be My Native (foaled 16 February 1979) was an American-bred, British-trained Thoroughbred racehorse and sire. As a two-year-old he won one minor race but established himself as a potentially top class horse by finishing second in the Dewhurst Stakes. In the following year he won the Prix La Force but produced his most notable performance when finishing runner-up in the second running of the Arlington Million. He recorded his biggest career win as a four-year-old when he won the Coronation Cup. Apart from the aforementioned races he was placed in the Sandown Classic Trial, Dante Stakes, La Coupe de Maisons-Laffitte and Hardwicke Stakes. After his retirement from racing he became a very successful sire of National Hunt horses.

== Background ==
Be My Native was a "neat, attractive" brown horse bred in Kentucky by Rowland W. Hancock. He was sired by Our Native, whose wins included the Flamingo Stakes, Ohio Derby and Monmouth Invitational Handicap in 1973. The best of Our Native's other progeny included I'm Splendid (Hollywood Starlet Stakes) and Rockhill Native (Blue Grass Stakes). Be My Native's dam was the Florida-bred mare Witchy Woman who was descended from Schwester, a full-sister to Equipoise.

As a yearling Be My Native was consigned to the Keeneland September sale and was bought for $45,000 by the bloodstock agent Tote Cherry-Downes. He entered the ownership of K Hsu and was sent into training with Robert Armstrong at Newmarket, Suffolk.

== Racing career ==
=== 1981: two-year-old season ===
Be My Native finished fourth behind Tin Boy in a maiden race over six furlongs at Newmarket Racecourse on his debut and then finished second to Lyphmas in a similar event over seven furlongs at the same track in August. He was equipped with blinkers when he finished fourth behind Mirabeau at Doncaster Racecourse in September. In the following month he contested the Tankerville Nursery (a handicap race for two-year-olds) over seven furlongs at Ascot Racecourse. Running for the first time on soft ground he showed impressive acceleration inside the final furlong and won by two lengths from Dageegah. The colt was then moved up sharply in class for the Group One Dewhurst Stakes at Newmarket on 16 October in which he started a 50/1 outsider. Ridden by Bruce Raymond he stayed on strongly to finish second behind Wind and Wuthering with the Richmond Stakes winner Tender King in third.

=== 1982: three-year-old season ===
Be My Native was highly tried in his second season, racing nine times, usually against top class opposition. In his first two starts he raced prominently in major trial races for The Derby finishing second to the Jeremy Tree-trained Peacetime in the Sandown Classic Trial and third behind Simply Great and Palace Gold in the Dante Stakes at York. He was then campaigned in France and recorded his first major win in the Prix La Force over 2000 metres at Longchamp Racecourse in May, beating Magwal by two and a half lengths. At Chantilly Racecourse in June he finished third to Melyno and Zino in a strongly-contested edition of the Prix Jean Prat with Green Forest last of the five runners. He was matched against older horses in the Prince of Wales's Stakes at Royal Ascot later that month but ran poorly and finished unplaced behind the four-year-old Kind of Hush.

After a break of two months Be My Native returned in the Benson and Hedges Gold Cup at York. He started a 25/1 outsider and finished sixth of the seven runners behind Assert. Be My Native had been entered in the second running of the Arlington Million, then the most valuable horse race in the world, but looked unlikely to take his place in the field as he was originally named the fourth reserve. Following a series of high-profile withdrawals he was drafted into the field but was given very little chance and started at odds of 72/1. Ridden by Earlie Fires he was well off the pace in the early stages but produced a strong late run along the rail to finish second to Perrault. The unplaced horses included Erins Isle, Lemhi Gold and Al Nasr. On his return to Europe the colt contested La Coupe de Maisons-Laffitte in September and finished a close third behind Coquelin and Bylly the Kid. He ended his season with a second visit to the United States but failed to reproduce his Arlington form as he finished last behind April Run in the Turf Classic.

=== 1983: four-year-old season ===
According to Robert Armstrong, Be My Native had a "thin skin" and was unsuited by the cold, wet spring of 1983. He ran poorly in his first two races, finishing unplaced behind the Henry Cecil-trained Ivano in both the Earl of Sefton Stakes and the Westbury Stakes. The colt was moved up in distance for 78th running of the Coronation Cup at Epsom Racecourse on 4 June with his task being made considerably easier by the late withdrawals of All Along and Time Charter. Electric (winner of the Great Voltigeur Stakes and Jockey Club Stakes) started favourite ahead of Diamond Shoal and Old Country (Derby Italiano, Prix Royal-Oak) with Be My Native the 8/1 fourth choice in a six-runner field. Ridden by Armstrong's brother-in-law Lester Piggott he raced at the rear of the field as Diamond Shoal set a slow pace. In the straight Be My Native accelerated along the inside rail, took the lead a furlong from the finish and held off the challenge of Electric to win by three quarters of a length.

Be My Native failed to reproduce his best form in four subsequent races, starting with the Hardwicke Stakes in which he finished a distant third behind Stanerra and Electric. He then finished ninth to Quilted in the Princess of Wales's Stakes at Newmarket before running for the second time in the Arlington Million and finishing eleventh behind Tolomeo. On his final start he went off a 50/1 outsider for the Champion Stakes at Newmarket in October and finished last of the nineteen runners.

== Assessment ==
In the official International Classification of European two-year-olds for 1981, Be My Native was given a rating of 78, ten pounds behind the top-rated Green Forest. The independent Timeform organisation rated him on 115, seventeen pounds inferior to their best two-year-old Wind and Wuthering but noted that he had the potential to become a "very good three-year-old". In 1982 he was rated 122 by Timeform who described him as an "entirely genuine" colt who acted on any going. In the following year he was again given a rating of 122 by Timeform with the organisation admitting in their annual Racehorses of 1984 that they were unable to explain to horse's lack of consistency. In the International Classification he was rated ten pounds inferior to the top older horse, All Along.

== Stud record ==
Be My Native was retired from racing to become a breeding stallion at the Ballylinch Stud in Ireland. The best of his flat runners was Artan who won the Premio Presidente della Repubblica. He was much more successful as a National Hunt stallion, siring numerous top-class horses and by 1995 he was covering more than 200 mares a year. His best jumpers included Native Upmanship, Rhinestone Cowboy, Harbour Pilot (Dr P. J. Moriarty Novice Chase), Hi Cloy (Melling Chase), Ned Kelly (Irish Champion Hurdle) and Watson Lake (Drinmore Novice Chase).

== Pedigree ==
Pedigree of Be My Native (USA), brown horse, 1979
Sire Our Native (USA) 1970	Exclusive Native (USA); 1965	Raise A Native	Native Dancer
Sire Our Native (USA) 1970	Exclusive Native (USA); 1965	Raise A Native	Raise You
Sire Our Native (USA) 1970	Exclusive Native (USA); 1965	Exclusive	Shut Out
Sire Our Native (USA) 1970	Exclusive Native (USA); 1965	Exclusive	Good Example
Sire Our Native (USA) 1970	Our Jackie (USA); 1964	Crafty Admiral	Fighting Fox
Sire Our Native (USA) 1970	Our Jackie (USA); 1964	Crafty Admiral	Admirals Lady
Sire Our Native (USA) 1970	Our Jackie (USA); 1964	Rakahanga	Polynesian
Sire Our Native (USA) 1970	Our Jackie (USA); 1964	Rakahanga	Mohduma
Dam Witchy Woman (USA) 1972	Strate Stuff (USA); 1965	Noholme	Star Kingdom
Dam Witchy Woman (USA) 1972	Strate Stuff (USA); 1965	Noholme	Oceana
Dam Witchy Woman (USA) 1972	Strate Stuff (USA); 1965	Lady Vale	Royal Vale
Dam Witchy Woman (USA) 1972	Strate Stuff (USA); 1965	Lady Vale	Lady Page
Dam Witchy Woman (USA) 1972	Witchy Norma (USA); 1967	Crimson Satan	Spy Song
Dam Witchy Woman (USA) 1972	Witchy Norma (USA); 1967	Crimson Satan	Papila
Dam Witchy Woman (USA) 1972	Witchy Norma (USA); 1967	Tomratta	Tompion
Dam Witchy Woman (USA) 1972	Witchy Norma (USA); 1967	Tomratta	Mahratta (Family: 5-j)
