= Pakistan II =

English-bred Thoroughbred racehorse and champion sire

- Sire: Palestine
- Grandsire: Fair Trial
- Dam: Tambara
- Damsire: Nasrullah
- Sex: Stallion
- Foaled: 1958
- Country: England
- Colour: chestnut
- Breeder: Prince Aly Khan
- Owner: Arthur Fell, Palmerston North
- Trainer: Alec Head, France
- Record: 14: 2-6
- Last updated on December 17, 2022,

Pakistan II (1958-1972) was an English thoroughbred racehorse, who became a champion sire in New Zealand.

== Breeding ==
Pakistan II was bred by Prince Aly Khan. His dam was Tambara, a placegetter in the 1950 English 1000 Guineas and he was sired by the stallion Palestine who was bred and raced by Aga Khan III and won the 1950 English 2000 Guineas.

== Racing career ==
His racing career consisted of 2 sprint race wins and 6 places from 14 starts in England and France. His wins were as a 4-year old in open handicaps at Aintree and Leicester. His placings included a third in a listed stakes at Longchamp as a 2-year old and three placings as a 3-year old, the best effort being second in the Prix du Chemin de Fer du Nord (Group 3, 1400m) at Chantilly.

== Stud career ==
In 1963 he was purchased and imported into New Zealand by Athur Fell of Fairdale Stud, Palmerston North. His initial crop of 27 foals saw 23 to the races for 19 winners.

Pakistan II's achievements at stud included being New Zealand's leading first-season sire in 1966-67 and the leading sire in the 1968–69, 1970–71 and 1973–74 seasons. He was runner up in the 1969–70, 1971–72, 1972–73 and 1974-75 seasons. Other top stallions during this time were Summertime, Le Filou, Kurdistan, Better Honey, Mellay, Gold Sovereign and Copenhagen II.

Pakistan II sired 43 individual stakes winners from just 326 runners, for a percentage of stakes winners to runners of 13.2%.

On 28 July 1972 he died from a ruptured abdominal blood vessel.

=== Notable progeny ===
Progeny of Pakistan II included:

- Ajasco (Ngatawa, by Llanstephan), winner of the 1972 Railway Stakes and 1971 Stewards Handicap
- Ayub Khan (Dawn Chorus), 20 wins including the Thompson Handicap, Stewards Handicap, Egmont Cup and Foxton Cup
- Count Kereru, 25 wins including the 1972 Telegraph Handicap and Ormond Memorial
- Deeds (1971, Chatty Lady), 6 wins in Australia, stood as a stallion at Brookdale Stud, Patea from 1978
- Honda, 17 wins
- Karachi, winner of 15 races, including four open handicaps in Sydney
- Prepak, winner of the 1971 New Zealand 1000 Guineas
- Purple Patch (Micheline by Le Filou), winner of 20 races
- Rajah Sahib (Gay Princess), winner of the Ellerslie Championship Stakes at two and the 1968 Caulfield Guineas & Cox Plate, 1971 Doncaster Handicap & Stradbroke Handicap
- Sharda (Paper Bonnet), 21 wins including the Manawatu Challenge Stakes, IATA International (Ellerslie), CJC Stewards Handicap and Churchill Stakes
- Sharif, 13 wins
- Tashi, winner of 13 races including the Avondale Championship Stakes
- Triton, winner of the 1972 AJC Epsom Handicap and Stradbroke Handicap
- Wood Court Inn, winner of the six races including the North Island Challenge Stakes and the Champagne Stakes (Riccarton)
- Zambari

== Legacy ==
Pakistan II can be found in the pedigree of many top New Zealand or Australian horses. For example:

- O'Reilly (1993, Last Tycoon-Courtza) and his progeny including Silent Achiever and Master O'Reilly. Pakistan II sired Huntza (1970), the dam of Courtza (1986, sire: Pompeii Court).
- Our Pompeii (1989, Pompeii Court-Huntza), who was the winner of the 1993 South Australian Derby, 1994 Sandown Cup and the Adelaide Cup in 1993 and 1994.
- Super Impose (1984, Imposing - Pheroz Fancy). Pakistan II sired Pheroz Jewel (1970, out of Pheroz Pride) who was the grand dam of Super Impose, the winner of eight Group One races including the 1992 Cox Plate.
- Ocean Park (2008, Thorn Park - Sayyida). Pakistan II sired Hunza (1970), the dam of Benazir (1984) who was the grand dam of Ocean Park.

== See also ==
- Thoroughbred racing in New Zealand
