= Fine and Dandy (disambiguation) =

"Fine and Dandy" is a 1930 popular song.

Fine and Dandy may also refer to:

- Fine and Dandy (musical), from where the song originated
- Fine and Dandy (horse), an Australian race horse active in 1958 to 1963
- The West Point Story (film), 1950, also known as Fine and Dandy
