= Sweet Embrace =

Australian-bred Thoroughbred racehorse

- Sire: Todman
- Grandsire: Star Kingdom
- Dam: Miss Port
- Damsire: Port Vista
- Sex: Mare
- Foaled: 1964
- Country: Australia
- Colour: Chestnut

Major wins
- Golden Slipper Stakes (1967)

Honours
- Sweet Embrace Stakes

Sweet Embrace was a notable Australian thoroughbred racehorse. She was a chestnut daughter of Todman from the Port Vista mare Miss Port.

She was owned by Jack and Bob Ingham.

She is best remembered for winning the 1967 STC Golden Slipper Stakes as a maiden at long odds of 40/1.

The Sweet Embrace Stakes run annually at Randwick Racecourse is named in her honour.
