= Fine and Dandy (horse) =

Australian racehorse

Fine and Dandy was an Australian champion racehorse in the period from 1958 to 1963. As a 2 year old, he won all the major races he contested in New South Wales, Victoria and Queensland and, as a result, broke Tulloch's stakes winning record for 2 year olds. After an unlucky defeat at his first start, he finished his 2 year old season with 7 consecutive wins and set the record for earnings with £19,024. When the Free Handicap weights were issued by the Australian Jockey Club handicapper, Fine and Dandy was the clear champion 2 year old. He raced against champions his own age such as Noholme, Aquanita and Travel Boy, and younger champions such as Sky High and Wenona Girl, all of whom he defeated in races now classed as Group 1. As an older horse, he won the prestigious Doncaster Handicap twice. The first time in 1961 he won by 4 lengths, setting a new Australian record for the mile, a time that was not equalled or broken before racing converted to the metric system. After a brief retirement he came back and won a second Doncaster in a time just 0.8 second outside his Australian Record.

== Background ==
Fine and Dandy (b. 1956) was bred by W.F. and F.A. Moses from their fast mare, Shading, and Star Kingdom, the champion sire from 1959–1962 and in 1965. He was chestnut with a white blaze and white socks on both back feet. His colours were white, yellow sleeves and black cap, a variation of the colours worn by the 1920 Melbourne Cup winner, Poitrel, who had been raced by earlier members of the Moses family. As a foal, he crashed into a fence and injured his near side shoulder and was lame for a long time. His trainer was Harry Plant who managed him carefully.

== At two years ==
=== 1958 Breeders' Plate, 5f ===
Fine and Dandy won his Randwick barrier trial and was favourite for the Breeders' Plate. However, he raced very wide, then was checked, and failed by head to catch stablemate Front Cover.

=== 1958 Canonbury Stakes, 5f ===
A week later in the Randwick Canonbury Stakes he raced to the front and accelerated away to win by 8 lengths in the fast time of 59.2 secs.

=== 1958 Maribyrnong Plate, 5f ===
In the Maribyrnong Plate Fine and Dandy met the best 2 year olds of Sydney and Melbourne. He won effortlessly by 8 lengths from Royal Artist, in one of the easiest wins in the history of the 2YO classic. A commentator remarked that "The further they went, the bigger his lead became."

=== 1959 Rosehill Flying Hcp, 31 January, 6f ===
At that time handicappers gave huge weights to champions and Plant later complained about the high weights Fine and Dandy had to carry relative to his opposition. To avoid high weights for his young horse, Plant ran his champion 2 year old against older horses. In this Flying, he met the 3 year old Bold Pilot who won Group 1 races including the Rawson Stakes where he beat Skyline the 1958 Slipper winner in course record time. Fine and Dandy fought off Bold Pilot to win narrowly.

=== 1959 Rosehill Flying Hcp, 21 February, 6f ===
Here he was favourite against several older horses who won Group 1 races. As they jumped, he shifted back, landed awkwardly and was last in a field of 20, but his speed enabled him to rapidly improve. He went past second favourite, In Love, who was fourth at the ½ mile post, and hit the front a furlong out to win by a length, an extraordinary win for a 2YO.

=== 1959 Golden Slipper Stakes 6f (Group 1) ===
The Golden Slipper Stakes was the richest race for 2 year olds in Australia and attracted a very strong field including the brilliant Noholme, the younger brother of Todman. Fine and Dandy was 11/8 on and Noholme second favourite at 11/4. In the straight Fine and Dandy accelerated away to a big lead and then coasted to the line for an easy win, with Noholme unplaced.

=== 1959 AJC Sires Produce Stakes, 7f (Group 1) ===
In the AJC Sires Produce Stakes he met Group 1 winner Travel Boy who had impressively won the VRC Sires Produce and Ascot Vale Stakes. They went head and head down the straight with Fine and Dandy gaining the upper hand nearing the post to win narrowly.

=== 1959 QTC Sires Produce Stakes, 7f ===
The QTC Sires Produce Stakes run at Eagle Farm racecourse was the big race for 2 year olds in Queensland, a Principal Race (before Group racing was introduced). Fine and Dandy led all the way, defeating Queensland's best 2YO, Intrigued.

=== Breaking Tulloch's stakes winning record for two-year-olds ===
In 1957 the great Tulloch had set a new stakes winning record for 2YO's of £18,479. Fine and Dandy's major wins in the Golden Slipper, AJC Sires, QTC Sires and VRC Maribyrnong Plate enabled him to break the record for earnings with £19,024.

When the Free Handicap weights were issued in August 1959, Find and Dandy was the clear champion 2YO, 5 lbs above the next best, Travel Boy, and 11 lbs above Noholme.

== At three years ==
Fine and Dandy missed all the 3YO classic races due to soreness in his near shoulder. Plant gave him a long spell.

=== 1960 City Tattersalls Club Flying, 6f ===
After nearly a year's absence, he made it 8 wins in a row when he won the City Tattersalls Club Flying at Randwick carrying 11 lbs more than 5YO Great Blaze who ran second. He was then sent to Brisbane for the rich Stradbroke Hcp.

=== 1960 Queensland Turf Club Lightning Stakes, 5F ===
In this sprint he struggled on the heavy track. He was second to 4YO emerging talent, Wallgar, who carried 2 stone less.

=== 1960 Stradbroke Handicap, 7f (Group 1) ===
In the Stradbroke as a 3YO he was handicapped at 1 stone 8 lbs more than 4YO Wallgar. The strong field included Second Earl, Prince Lea and In Love who all won Group 1 races. From gate 13 he raced outside Second Earl and the two set a fast pace. He drew clear and looked the winner but was again second, caught late by Wallgar. Second Earl, Prince Lea and In Love were unplaced. Turf expert Roy Abbott commented on the huge disparity in weights.

His form then deteriorated. He was third in the Healy Stakes to horses he had beaten clearly in the Stradbroke. Plant wanted to scratch him from the Doomben 10,000 but he did run and was unplaced.

== At four years ==
=== 1960 Chester Handicap, 6f ===
After a spell, he won the Chester Handicap beating high class mare Merry Polly. This sprint was part of the AJC Spring Carnival for many years. The champion Beauford, who won 2 of his 4 races against Gloaming, won the Chester Hcp in 1920 but it has now been discontinued. Merry Polly had recently won The Shorts and was beaten only a ½ length in the Newmarket Hcp. He defeated her by 1¼ lengths but carried 1 stone more and Plant and the owners were not happy with the heavy weights he had been getting.

He then had an unsuccessful trip to Melbourne. In the George Adams mile, on a heavy track, he carried 11 lbs more than champion miler Aquanita, who won by a head from Sky High. Plant had to spell him.

=== A conditioning run in a Flying ===
Fine and Dandy resumed in February 1961 in a Flying Hcp (6f). He carried 9.4, 1 stone 2 lbs more than the winner Achnacary who was race fit and had won three of his last four starts. Fine and Dandy ran a creditable third given his lack of fitness.

=== 1961 Railway Quality Handicap, 7f (Group 1) ===
He then ran in the Railway Quality with the big weight of 9.4 and gate 17. He spent energy crossing the field but had the race won until the last stride when lightly weighted 6YO Grecian Vale, with 1 stone 7 lbs less, beat him by a short head. He was on the speed all the way and the time was a race record. This run brought him to peak fitness.

=== 1961 Doncaster Handicap, 1 mile (Group 1) ===
In the Doncaster Fine and Dandy drew gate 19 but crossed the field and set a very fast pace to win easily. He defeated Sky High by 4 lengths, Wenona Girl by 6 lengths, Aquanita by 7 lengths and set a new Australian record for the mile of 1 min 34.2 secs. Turf expert John Schofield called it an "amazing feat of sustained sprinting".

The Age turf expert 'Heroic' wrote: "Sky High was always handy but, brilliant as this colt has proved himself, he was run off his legs by the winner" and "The first two furlongs were run in 23½ sec., the first half-mile in 47½ sec., the first five furlongs in 1.0½ and the six furlongs in 1.11. It was a terrific exhibition of sustained speed as Fine and Dandy ran home the last two furlongs in 23 1-5 sec. to win by 4 lengths."

Fine and Dandy still holds the mile record as its 1600m metric replacement is 30.7 feet shorter.

=== 1961 City Tattersalls Club Flying, 6f ===
Fine and Dandy next ran in the City Tattersalls Club Flying, handicapped at 9.7, in a strong field. He won easily from extreme lightweight Seal Keeper (6.11) with Grecian Vale (7.11) beating Martello Towers (9.0) in a photo for third.

=== 1961 Civic Handicap, 6f ===
He was handicapped at 9.11 in the Civic Hcp, the principal winter sprint, where he met champion filly Wenona Girl with 8.11. She led into the straight where he joined her and the two champions went head and head until Fine and Dandy drew away to win by a neck. He was now a strong Stradbroke favourite. Wenona Girl was the Stradbroke second favourite.

=== 1961 Stradbroke Hcp, 7f (Group 1) ===
He was top weight at 9.4, 7 lbs more than Aquanita and 11 lbs more than Wenona Girl but fell ill in Brisbane on the Tuesday before the race with a temperature of 104 degrees F. On race morning Plant was uncertain about his condition so he started but ran last, pulling up distressed. Plant said "there was definitely something wrong with the horse" and withdrew him from the Doomben 10,000. The winner was Persian Lyric whom Fine and Dandy had easily beaten two weeks earlier in the Civic Hcp.

== At five years ==
In his 5YO season, he had to carry heavy weights against top class opposition. He resumed in the Warwick Stakes (now Group 1) over 7 furlongs, where he ran a solid fourth. In the Daily Telegraph Stakes (6f), Sky High (9.3) won by a neck from Columbia Star. Fine and Dandy carrying 9.5 was fourth with Wenona Girl (8.10) fifth, 2 lengths behind him .

=== 1961 Epsom Handicap, 1 mile (Group 1) ===
His main target in Sydney was the rich Epsom Handicap where he again met the brilliant Sky High. Fine and Dandy had the top weight of 9.4 and Sky High had 9.2. Sky High gained a winning lead on the home turn and Fine and Dandy finished fast for a strong second, beaten 1¾ lengths. Wenona Girl carrying 8.9 ran sixth. Sky High had run 1 min 34.3 secs, only 0.1 sec outside Fine and Dandy's Australian record. Sky High was now widely regarded as Australia's best racehorse after Tulloch's retirement.

=== Rosehill Flying (6f) ===
His next campaign began in a Flying where he was handicapped at 9.11, 1 stone 2 lbs more than the rising star Kilshery and 2 stone, 9 lbs more than Minikin. He needed the conditioning run but finished strongly for third behind Kilshery and Minikin.

=== 1962 Railway Quality, 7f (Group 1) ===
Fine and Dandy had the heavy weight of 9.7, 10 lbs more than the favourite, Kilshery. He was beaten a ½ neck by Prince Regoli who carried 2 stone 5 lbs less, a huge differential, with Kilshery fourth.

=== 1962 Doncaster Hcp, 1 mile (Group 1) ===
In Fine and Dandy's second Doncaster he was going well in second place but at the ½ mile post, he "was knocked out of the race" by the wayward Mullala and nearly fell, resulting in a stewards' enquiry. Fine and Dandy, carrying the top weight of 9.5, only just managed to stay on his feet but rapidly dropped back through the field, ending his prospects.

Soon after he was third in the All Aged Stakes (Group 1) on a bog track in a very slow 1 min 43.7 secs for the mile.

=== 1962 City Tattersalls Club Flying, 6f ===
Fine and Dandy then ran in the City Tattersalls Club Flying where he was handicapped at 9.11. Fine and Dandy won easily while the favourite Prince Regoli, carrying 8.0, was unplaced.

=== 1962 Stradbroke Hcp, 7f (Group 1) ===
In the 1962 Stradbroke Fine and Dandy carried 9.2 and Kilshery had 8.10. Kilshery, at the peak of his form, won in race record time. Fine and Dandy ran on gamely under his 9.2 for a strong third, but Aquanita was unplaced.

His form tapered off in the lead up races to the Doomben 10,000 and he finished unplaced in that race.

== At six years ==
He resumed in the Tramway Hcp (7f) where he was allotted 9.7 and ran a solid fifth to Bogan Road. Then in the Theo Marks Quality with 8.12 he finished fast along the rails for a close third to Bush Belle.

These were warm-up races for the 1962 Epsom where he would again clash with Sky High but his form had deteriorated and he was unplaced. Sky High took the lead in the straight but struggled under his huge weight and was also unplaced. Fine and Dandy followed this with a fifth to New Statesman in the George Main Stakes in a bunched finish.

=== Temporary retirement ===
Plant knew that Fine and Dandy was racing well below his best and related why he was temporarily retired. He said "Although he is a big horse, Fine and Dandy cannot carry big weights, yet practically all his life he has been handicapped to carry more than 9 stone". Rather than have him continue under heavy weights that could aggravate his shoulder problems the owners retired him. He was turned out to the paddocks and left to fend for himself, eating only grass and not being given any feed. He began to thrive on this and his owners noticed how well he was doing. After 4 months out, they decided to give him another chance at racing, in particular another shot at the Doncaster.

=== G. F. Wilson Hcp ===
He resumed racing in the G. F. Wilson Hcp at Warwick Farm and was allocated top weight at 9.7. In the straight, he finished strongly along the rails for third to the lightly weighted Trace Call (7.9) and Port Fair (7.0), only a length behind the winner.

=== 1963 Liverpool Handicap, 7f ===
He then ran in the Liverpool Handicap (now the Liverpool City Cup), where he was given 9.3. It was usually held at Warwick Farm but rain had flooded the track and was held at Randwick where the track was heavy. He finished brilliantly to take the lead near the post, beating Figaro by a long neck with Le Storm a close third.

=== 1963 Doncaster Hcp, 1 mile (Group 1) ===
Fine and Dandy was thriving. In Tuesday trackwork, he gave Le Storm 6 lengths start, caught up to him and beat him by 6 lengths. He was 4/1 favourite in a very strong field. Two major rivals were Prince Regoli who won the Group 1 Railway Quality and Our Cobber who won the Group 1 Newmarket Handicap, beating Kilshery, with Wenona Girl unplaced. Fine and Dandy (8.12) defeated Our Cobber (8.6) by half a length without being fully extended. His rider, Bill Pyers said "he won with something in hand". His time was very fast, only 4/5 sec outside his Australian record.

Fine and Dandy was a Golden Slipper winner who had maintained his brilliance as an older horse to win two Doncaster Handicaps. No other Golden Slipper winner has completed this treble.

With his 1961 and 1963 wins Fine and Dandy had recorded the two fastest times in the history of the Doncaster, which in 1963 had been run 98 times. In 1961 he set a race and Australian record and in 1963 equalled the previous race record set by Tudor Hill in 1960.

=== 1963 Stradbroke ===
Eight weeks later he ran his last race in the 1963 Stradbroke carrying 9.5 in a field of 24 but was unplaced.

== Trainer ==
Fine and Dandy was trained by Harry Plant who also trained the 1940s champion Bernborough.

Plant humanely looked after his horses. In the 20th century, handicappers gave huge weights to champions and very low ones to inferior horses to give them a good chance to win. Plant complained about the high weights Fine and Dandy had to carry relative to his opposition as a result of his winning 2 year old season and record-breaking Doncaster win. As a foal, he had injured his near side shoulder and was lame for a long time. He missed most of his 3 year old season from shoulder problems. Plant said that Fine and Dandy always took his weight on his off leg so he kept "his off leg tightly bandaged to help it take the strain".

Plant was inducted into the Australian Racing Hall of Fame in 2010.

== Retirement ==
In his final years, Fine and Dandy had been plagued by rheumatism and was in fat condition on his owners' property "Valais" at Willow Tree, NSW. He was finding it difficult to get about. Finally he got down and couldn't get up. His owners tried to get him to his feet and couldn't succeed so they decided to have him put down.

Fine and Dandy died in March 1974. Harry Plant paid tribute to his horse saying "He was a true champion because Fine and Dandy was never really sound," recalling his injuries, "He was really a marvel to be able to do what he did".

== Summary ==
44 Starts: 15 wins, 7 seconds, 7 thirds, 3 fourths.

Main races contested
Result	Year	Race	Distance	Hcp weight
First	1963	Doncaster Handicap	8 F	8.12
First	1961	Doncaster Handicap	8 F	8.10
First	1963	Liverpool Hcp (Liverpool City Cup)	7 F	9.3
First	1961	Civic Handicap	6 F	9.11
First	1960	Chester Handicap	6 F	9.3
First	1962	City Tattersalls Club Flying	6 F	9.11
First	1961	City Tattersalls Club Flying	6 F	9.7
First	1960	City Tattersalls Club Flying	6 F	8.13
First	1959	Golden Slipper Stakes	6 F	8.7
First	1959	AJC Sires Produce Stakes	7 F	8.10
First	1959	QTC Sires Produce Stakes	7 F	8.10
First	1958	Maribyrnong Plate	5 F	8.10
First	1958	Canonbury Stakes	5 F	8.5
Second	1961	Epsom Handicap	8 F	9.4
Second	1962	Railway Quality (George Ryder Stakes)	7 F	9.7
Second	1961	Railway Quality (George Ryder Stakes)	7 F	9.4
Second	1960	Stradbroke Handicap	7 F	8.8
Second	1960	QTC Lightning Stakes	5 F	9.1
Third	1962	Stradbroke Handicap	7 F	9.2
Third	1962	All Aged Stakes	8 F	9.1
Third	1962	Theo Marks Quality	7 F	8.12

== Pedigree ==
Pedigree of Fine and Dandy (AUS), chestnut gelding, 1956
Sire Star Kingdom (IRE) ch. 1946	Stardust (GB); 1937	Hyperion (GB); 1930	Gainsborough (GB)
Sire Star Kingdom (IRE) ch. 1946	Stardust (GB); 1937	Hyperion (GB); 1930	Selene (GB)
Sire Star Kingdom (IRE) ch. 1946	Stardust (GB); 1937	Sister Stella (GB); 1923	Friar Marcus (GB)
Sire Star Kingdom (IRE) ch. 1946	Stardust (GB); 1937	Sister Stella (GB); 1923	Etoile (GB)
Sire Star Kingdom (IRE) ch. 1946	Impromptu (IRE); 1939	Concerto (GB); 1928	Orpheus (IRE)
Sire Star Kingdom (IRE) ch. 1946	Impromptu (IRE); 1939	Concerto (GB); 1928	Constellation (GB)
Sire Star Kingdom (IRE) ch. 1946	Impromptu (IRE); 1939	Thoughtless (GB); 1934	Papyrus (GB)
Sire Star Kingdom (IRE) ch. 1946	Impromptu (IRE); 1939	Thoughtless (GB); 1934	Virgin's Folly (GB)
Dam Shading (AUS) ch. 1944	Brueghel (ITY); 1932	Pharos (GB); 1920	Phalaris (GB)
Dam Shading (AUS) ch. 1944	Brueghel (ITY); 1932	Pharos (GB); 1920	Scapa Flow (GB)
Dam Shading (AUS) ch. 1944	Brueghel (ITY); 1932	Bunworry (GB); 1921	Great Sport (IRE)
Dam Shading (AUS) ch. 1944	Brueghel (ITY); 1932	Bunworry (GB); 1921	Waffles (IRE)
Dam Shading (AUS) ch. 1944	Gold Tinge (AUS); 1925	Claro (GB); 1919	Clarissimus (GB)
Dam Shading (AUS) ch. 1944	Gold Tinge (AUS); 1925	Claro (GB); 1919	Harmonica (GB)
Dam Shading (AUS) ch. 1944	Gold Tinge (AUS); 1925	Rangiriri (AUS); 1917	Linacre (GB)
Dam Shading (AUS) ch. 1944	Gold Tinge (AUS); 1925	Rangiriri (AUS); 1917	Regent Bird (AUS)

== Bibliography ==
Arrold, T. (1980). Champions: the Racing Record of Famous Thoroughbreds in Australia. Tralca Publications: Sydney, Australia. ISBN 0 9594458 0 3.

Arrold, T. (1983). More Champions: the Racing Record of Famous Thoroughbreds in Australia. Tralca Publications: Sydney, Australia. ISBN 0 9594458 1 1.

Caves, G. (2002). Wenona Girl: the forgotten champion. Caves: Greystanes, NSW, Australia. ISBN 0 9581596 0 2.

Linnett, K. (2017). Tulloch: The extraordinary life and times of a true champion. Slattery Media Group: Melbourne, Australia. ISBN 9780958029032.
