= Noholme =

Australian-bred Thoroughbred racehorse

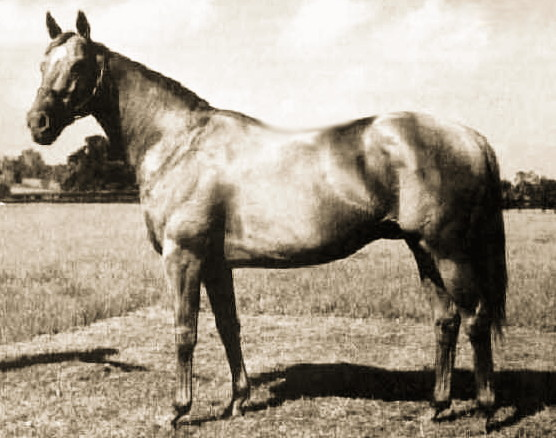
- Sire: Star Kingdom (IRE)
- Grandsire: Stardust
- Dam: Oceana (IRE)
- Damsire: Colombo
- Sex: Stallion
- Foaled: 6 October 1956
- Died: 17 May 1983 (aged 26)
- Country: Australia
- Colour: Chestnut
- Breeder: Stanley Wootten
- Owner: Stanley Wootten (Australia); Gene Goff (USA)
- Trainer: Maurice McCarten (Australia); Arthur W. Beuzeville (USA)
- Record: 41: 12-9-2
- Earnings: A$43,234 & US$40,194

Major wins
- Champagne Stakes (1959); Epsom Handicap (1959); Hill Stakes (1959); CB Fisher Plate (1959); Linlithgow Stakes (1959); W S Cox Plate (1959); All Aged Stakes (1960)

Awards
- Australian Horse of the Year (1959)
- Last updated on 16 September 2011

Noholme (also known as Noholme II) (1956–1983) was an Australian Thoroughbred racehorse who was the 1959 Australian Horse of the Year and who took nearly a full second off the race record in winning the prestigious Cox Plate.

He was sired by Star Kingdom (IRE), the Leading sire in Australia on five occasions and sire of Sky High, Fine and Dandy etc. Noholme's dam, Oceana, was a daughter of the brilliant miler Colombo (won 2,000 Guineas Stakes and was third in the Epsom Derby) from the good mare Orama by Diophon (also won the 2,000 Guineas). Noholme was a full brother to the stallions, Todman, Faringdon and Shifnal. These four stallions sired progeny that had earned over $12 million in stakes-money to the end of 1979.

== Racing record ==
The small, 15 hands 2 inches, chestnut colt was trained by Maurice McCarten in Sydney, Australia.

At two years he started five times for three wins and a second. Noholme was unplaced in the prestigious Golden Slipper Stakes, won by Fine and Dandy. He followed this with a win in the Champagne Stakes defeating Prince Lea. In the Free Handicap he was ranked sixth, 11 lbs less than the champion two-year old Fine and Dandy.

At three years Noholme won the Campbelltown Hcp (6f) but then ran unplaced to Martello Towers in the Canterbury Guineas classic. He then won the STC Hill Stakes defeating Irish Folly. His next start was in the Epsom Handicap where he defeated In Love and Scenic Star and ran the mile in a fast 1:34:9.

He then went to Melbourne for the prestigious Caulfield Guineas classic over one mile where he ran second to Prince Lea. He next won the weight-for-age W. S. Cox Plate over ten furlongs where he defeated Grand Garry in a race record of 2:02.7. He followed this with wins in the VRC Linlithgow Stakes and VRC CB Fisher Plate. He was then spelled.

Noholme resumed in the 1960 WFA St George Stakes where he was second to the Victorian champion Lord, who defeated him by 2½ lengths. He followed this with an unplaced run in the VRC Newmarket Handicap won by Correct.

Two weeks later he was back in Sydney where he was third in the STC Rawson Stakes behind Bardshah and Froth. His final run was in the 1960 AJC All Aged Stakes where he defeated In Love and Martello Towers.

In July 1960 he was purchased by an American horseman Gene Goff who exported him to the United States where he was trained by Arthur W. Beuzeville and raced as Noholme II until being retired to stud. Noholme was part of a shipload of forty-one Thoroughbreds bought by Goff in Australia where he spent considerable time as a result of his investment in oil exploration in the Maryborough Basin of coastal Queensland. Noholme II started 24 times in the US for 2 wins, 6 seconds, 1 third and 15 unplaced. He was placed in the Orange Bowl, Chicago, Stars and Stripes, and Bougainvillea Turf Handicaps.

== Stud record ==
A successful stallion at Goff's Verna Lea Farm in Fayetteville, Arkansas, in 1967 he was syndicated for $1-million and moved to Robin's Nest Farm near Ocala, Florida then in 1974 to the nearby stud farm owned by Dan Lasater (now Southland Farm) where he died on 17 May 1983 at the age of 27. Noholme was the first horse to be buried in the Lasater Farm equine cemetery.

In his limited first season, he sired 13 live foals, 11 of which were race winners. Noholme sired 24 two-year-old winners in his next crop, putting him on top of the American list of first crop sires. In that first crop was champion handicap horse Nodouble, an outstanding runner who was voted American Co-Champion Older Male Horse honours in 1969 and 1970 and was the Leading sire in North America in 1981. Nodouble sired over 450 stakes winners that earned over $11.6 million during his career.

Noholme's has sired 279 winners of 1,432 races and his other offspring include:

- Brigand, sire of Cole Diesel (won Caulfield Cup)
- Carnauba, Premio Oaks d'Italia (Italian Oaks), champion Italian filly
- Fools Holme, the 1986 South African Horse of the Year,
- General Holme, European stakes-winner, significant sire in France.
- Shecky Greene, the 1973 American Champion Sprint Horse and in a short career, he in turn sired Green Forest, the champion two-year-old of Europe in 1981, and a successful sire.

== Sire line tree ==
- Noholme
  - Nodouble
    - Double Discount
    - Overskate
    - Semipalatinsk
  - Shecky Greene
    - Green Forest
      - Green Line Express
      - Somethingdifferent
      - Made Of Gold
      - Prime Glade
      - Forest Wind
      - Bonzer
      - Antequera
      - Royal Russian
      - Singh
  - Brigand
    - Cole Diesel
  - General Holme
  - Fools Holme
