= Todman =

Thoroughbred racehorse

- Sire: Star Kingdom
- Grandsire: Stardust
- Dam: Oceana
- Damsire: Colombo
- Sex: Stallion
- Foaled: 7 October 1954
- Died: 13 June 1976 (aged 21)
- Country: Australia
- Colour: Chestnut
- Breeder: Stanley Wootton
- Record: 12:10-1-0

Major wins
- Golden Slipper Stakes (1957); Champagne Stakes (1957); Hobartville Stakes (1957); Canterbury Guineas (1957); Lightning Stakes (1960); Futurity Stakes (1960)

Honours
- Australian Racing Hall of Fame; Todman Stakes run at Randwick Racecourse

Todman (7 October 1954 – 1976) was one of the greatest Australian Thoroughbred racehorses and an important sire. He was perhaps best known as the winner of the inaugural STC Golden Slipper in 1957, being the first of Star Kingdom's five successive winners of the race. In 2023, he was described as "the best winner of the race". He was inducted into the Australian Racing Hall of Fame in 2005.

== Background ==
Todman was bred at Alf Ellison's Baramul Stud in the Widden Valley, New South Wales by Stanley Wootton who had imported his sire, Star Kingdom (IRE) and also Newtown Wonder (GB) to Australia. He was a striking chestnut stallion from Oceana (GB) by Colombo. He was a brother to Noholme II (winner of the AJC Epsom Handicap, Cox Plate etc. and a successful sire in US) and the stakes producing sires Faringdon and Shifnal.

Todman won from six furlongs to 9 1/2 furlongs and was successful five times in races that are now classed as Group One races. Todman was a notable sprinter, winning his first race by 10 lengths. He then won the Golden Slipper Stakes by eight lengths and the Champagne Stakes by six lengths when he defeated Tulloch. He also won the Canterbury Guineas by eight lengths and ran record times in seven of his 10 wins. Todman raced 12 times for 10 wins, one second, and one unplaced.

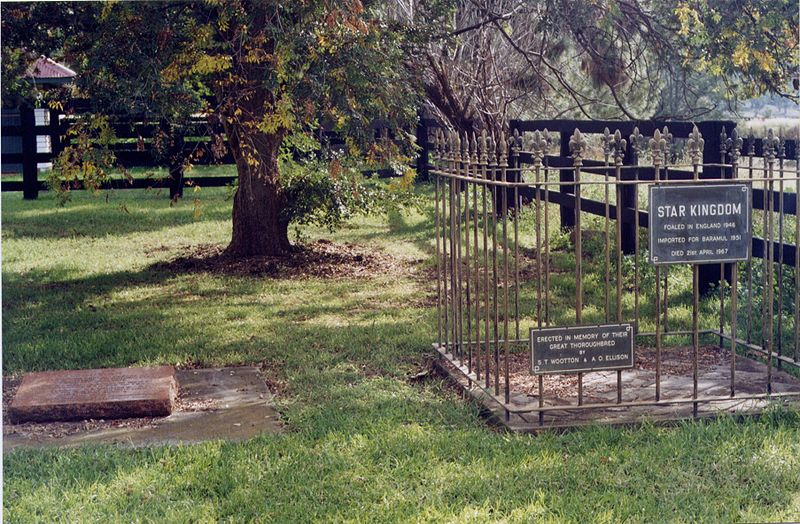
Headstones commemorating Todman and his sire, Star Kingdom at Baramul Stud.

== Racing record ==
=== 1956–57 season as a two-year-old ===
Result	Race	Venue	Distance (fur)	Weight (st.lb)	Time	Jockey
Won	AJC Juvenile Hcp	Randwick	5	8.3	0:57.8	N. Sellwood
Won	AJC December Stakes	Randwick	6	8.5	1:11.6	N. Sellwood
Won	STC Welter Hcp	Rosehill	6	8.7	1:11.4	N. Sellwood
Won	STC Golden Slipper Stakes	Rosehill	6	8.7	1:11.4	N. Sellwood
2nd	AJC Sires Produce Stakes	Randwick	7	8.10	1:25.2	N. Sellwood
Won	AJC Champagne Stakes	Randwick	6	8.10	1:10.0	N. Sellwood

=== 1957–58 season as a three-year-old ===
Result	Race	Venue	Distance (fur)	Weight (st.lb)	Time	Jockey
Won	AJC Hobartville Stakes	Warwick Farm	7	8.10	1:25.8	N. Sellwood
Won	STC Canterbury Guineas	Canterbury	9.5	8.5	2:0.0	N. Sellwood
last	STC Hill Stakes	Rosehill	8.5	7.9	1:44.2	N. Sellwood

=== 1958–59 season as a four-year-old ===
Todman did not race as a 4yo, he broke down in the Hill Stakes and did not resume racing until just over two years later.

=== 1959–60 season as a five-year-old ===
Result	Race	Venue	Distance (fur)	Weight (st.lb)	Time	Jockey
Won	STC Flying Hcp	Canterbury	6	9.7	1:10.9	N. Sellwood
Won	VRC Lightning Stakes	Flemington	5	9	0:59.25	N. Sellwood
Won	VATC Futurity Stakes	Caulfield	7	10.2	1:23.8	N. Sellwood

== Stud record ==
Todman commenced stud duty in 1960 and stood at the Widden Stud and Baramul Studs in the Widden Valley. He sired 30 stakeswinners with 63 stakeswins including Golden Slipper winners Eskimo Prince (1964) and Sweet Embrace (1967), Blue Diamond winners Blazing Saddles (1977) and New Gleam (1973) as well as other quality stakes winning racehorses, such as Ricochet, Imposing and Crewman (five stakeswins). His progeny have won more than $2.27 million. Daughters of Todman have produced the winners of more than $2.36 million. These winners saw Todman win at least 13 financial sires' premierships to make him one of the best locally bred sires produced in Australasia.

Todman died on 13 June 1976 at the Widden Stud, where he had spent his last four years. He was buried and commemorated by a headstone placed beside Star Kingdom's headstone at the Baramul Stud. In 1978 at least 51 sons of Todman were standing at stud in Australia and New Zealand.

A life-sized statue of Todman has been erected at Rosehill Gardens (home of the Golden Slipper), surrounded by a series of plaques for each of the winners of the great race.

== Sire line tree ==
- Todman
  - Cambaman
  - Eskimo Prince
  - Prince Of Baden
  - Joking
  - Crewman
  - Ricochet
  - Beaches
  - New Gleam
  - Blazing Saddles
    - Mr Brooks
  - Bootee
  - Imposing
    - Importune
    - Imprimatur
    - Super Impose

== Pedigree ==
Pedigree of Todman, bay stallion, 1954
Sire Star Kingdom (IRE) 1946	Stardust (GB); 1937	Hyperion	Gainsborough
Sire Star Kingdom (IRE) 1946	Stardust (GB); 1937	Hyperion	Selene*
Sire Star Kingdom (IRE) 1946	Stardust (GB); 1937	Sister Stella	Friar Marcus
Sire Star Kingdom (IRE) 1946	Stardust (GB); 1937	Sister Stella	Etoile
Sire Star Kingdom (IRE) 1946	Impromptu (IRE); 1939	Concerto	Orpheus
Sire Star Kingdom (IRE) 1946	Impromptu (IRE); 1939	Concerto	Constellation
Sire Star Kingdom (IRE) 1946	Impromptu (IRE); 1939	Thoughtless	Papyrus
Sire Star Kingdom (IRE) 1946	Impromptu (IRE); 1939	Thoughtless	Virgin's Folly
Dam Oceana (AUS) 1947	Colombo (GB); 1931	Manna	Phalaris
Dam Oceana (AUS) 1947	Colombo (GB); 1931	Manna	Waffles
Dam Oceana (AUS) 1947	Colombo (GB); 1931	Lady Nairne	Chaucer*
Dam Oceana (AUS) 1947	Colombo (GB); 1931	Lady Nairne	Lammermuir
Dam Oceana (AUS) 1947	Orama (GB); 1932	Diophon	Grand Parade
Dam Oceana (AUS) 1947	Orama (GB); 1932	Diophon	Donetta
Dam Oceana (AUS) 1947	Orama (GB); 1932	Cantelupe	Amadis
Dam Oceana (AUS) 1947	Orama (GB); 1932	Cantelupe	Lupercalia

* Todman is inbred 5S x 4D to the stallion Chaucer, meaning that he appears fifth generation (via Selene) on the sire side of his pedigree, and fourth generation on the dam side of his pedigree.
