= Claude M. Leigh =

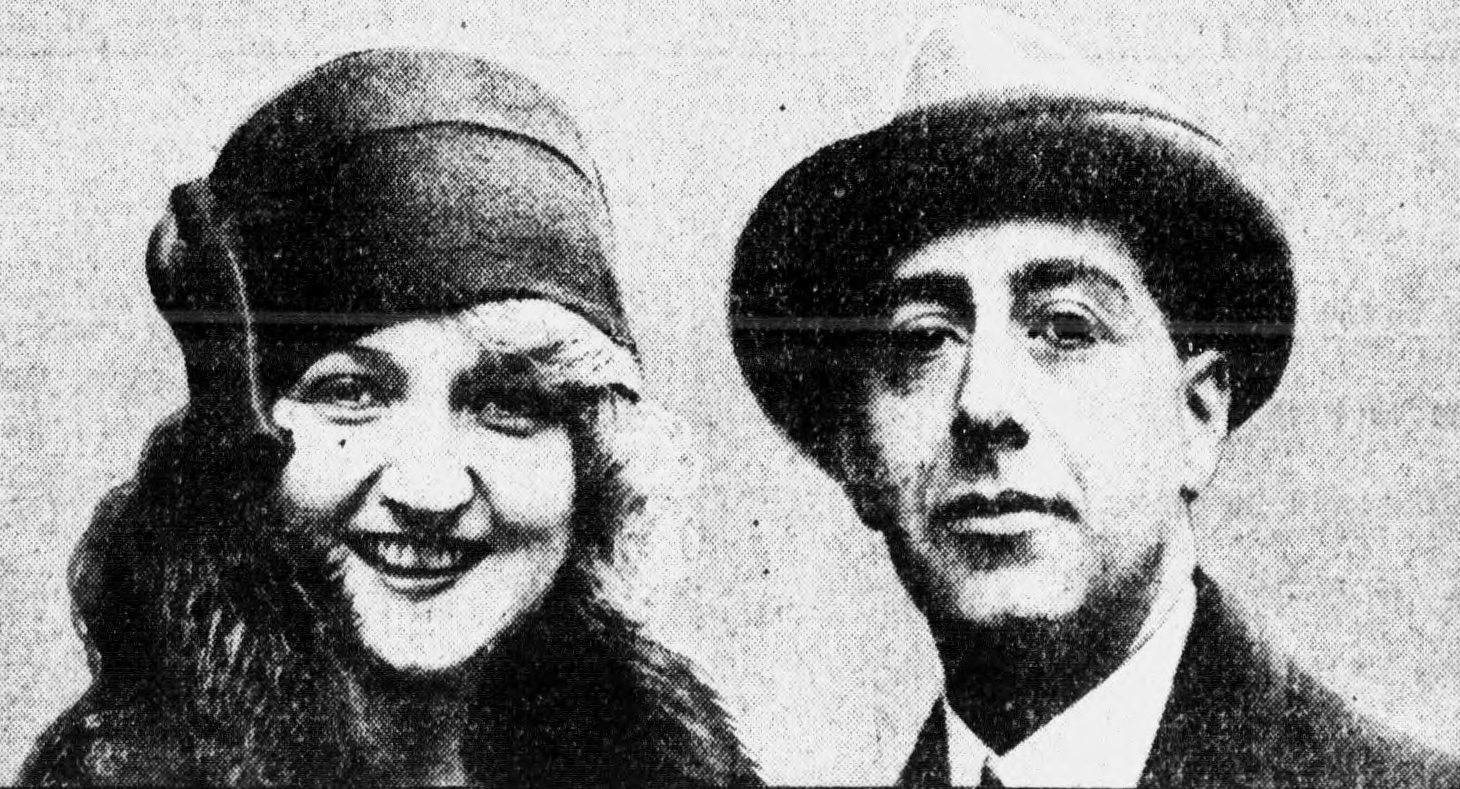
Claude Leigh with his wife Myrtle in 1925

Claude Moss Leigh (17 May 1888 – 19 January 1964) was a pioneer of social housing in the United Kingdom and the founder of MEPC plc, one of the United Kingdom's largest property companies.

== Career ==
The son of London surveyor, Claude Leigh initially joined his father's business before venturing out on his own providing quality housing for working class people.

Leigh was a pioneer of social housing who in 1929 established the Metropolitan Housing Corporation to provide rented accommodation in London. By 1937 he was attracting attention because of the large number of blocks of residential accommodation he was buying up.

In 1946, following the introduction of rent controls, Leigh focussed on commercial property and merged his business with several others to form the Metropolitan Estates & Property Corporation. He expanded this business into one of the United Kingdom's largest property concerns.

Leigh was also keen on horse racing and owned racehorses: he acquired the famous racecourse, Star Kingdom, in 1949.

He died in January 1964 at Montego Bay in Jamaica.

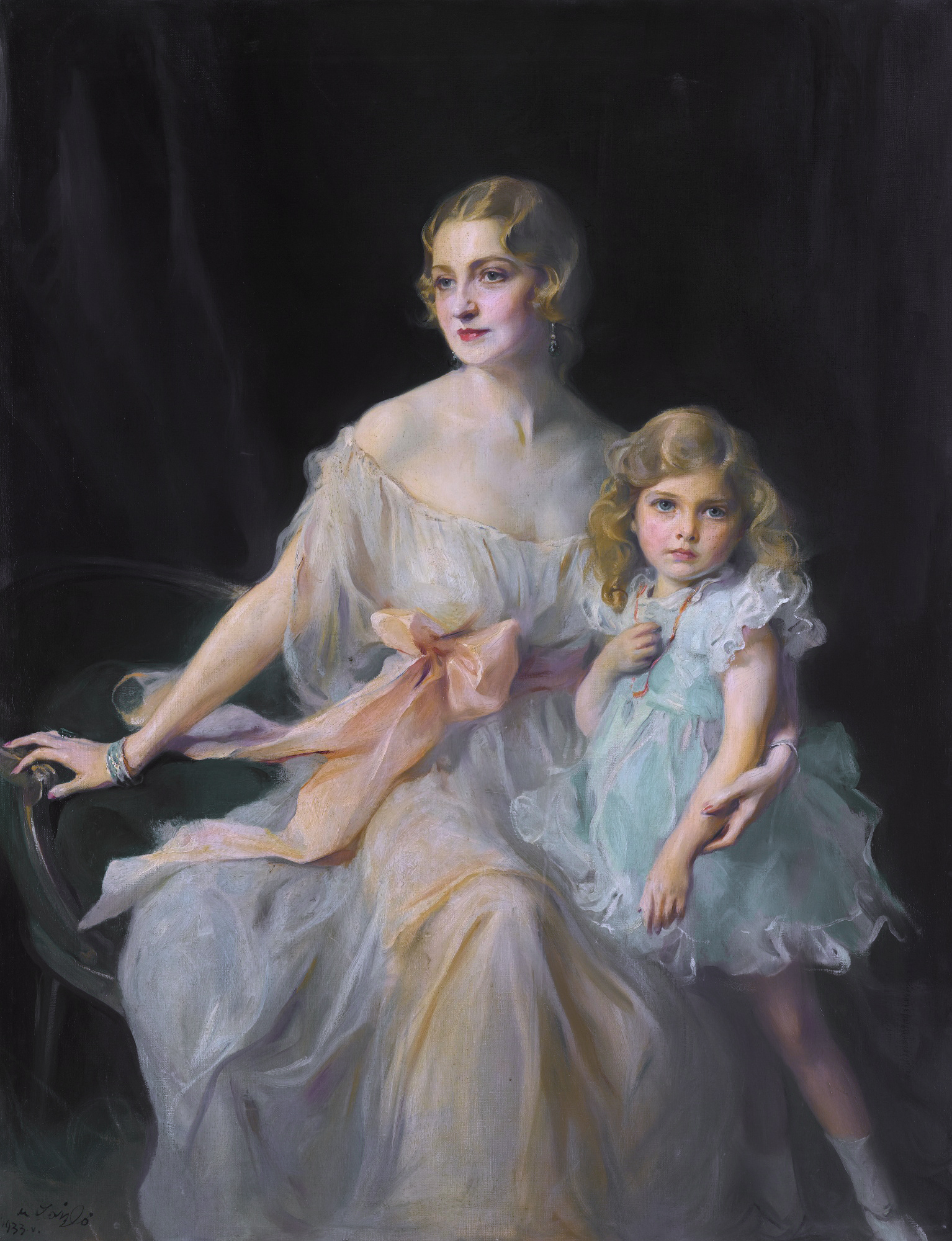
Mrs. Claude Leigh and Miss Virginia Leigh (Philip Alexius de Laszlo, 1933)

== Family ==
He was married three times—in 1913 to Ester Boss, in 1925 to Myrtle Johnson and in 1945 to Gay Laithwaite.
