= MEPC plc =

Property company of the United Kingdom

MEPC
- Type: Subsidiary
- Industry: Property
- Founded: 1946
- Headquarters: Milton Park
- Key people: Chris Taylor, Chairman; James Dipple, CEO
- Products: Business Parks
- Parent: Federated Hermes
- Website: www.mepc.com

MEPC is a British-based property investment and development business. It is headquartered in Milton Park, Oxfordshire. It used to be listed on the London Stock Exchange and was once a constituent of the FTSE 100 Index. It is however now owned by Federated Hermes.

== History ==
The business was founded by Claude Moss Leigh in 1946 as the Metropolitan Estates & Property Corporation. Having started as a property investment business it diversified into the development of shopping malls in the 1970s. It adopted the shortened name of MEPC in 1973. In 1987 it acquired the Oldham Estate.

In 2000 the Company was acquired by Leconport Estates, a joint venture between the British Telecom Pension Fund and GE Capital. In 2003 GE Capital sold its investment to the British Telecom Pension Fund. Since then the Royal Mail Pension Fund acquired a substantial shareholding in MEPC.

In 2014, Hermes Real Estate exchanged on the sale of three MEPC parks in the South East, North West and Scotland: Chineham Park in Basingstoke, Birchwood Park in Warrington and Hillington Park in Glasgow.

Federated Hermes acquired MEPC in 2020.

== Operations ==
The Group now focuses its activities on operating four business parks across the UK:

- Milton Park - A business and science park located just outside Oxford near the town of Abingdon
- Wellington Place - A business park located in the city centre of Leeds.
- Silverstone Park - A business park with a focus on engineering and high-tech activities, located on the Silverstone Circuit in Towcester.
