= Bel Bolide =

American-bred Thoroughbred racehorse

- Sire: Bold Bidder
- Grandsire: Bold Ruler
- Dam: Lady Graustark
- Damsire: Graustark
- Sex: Stallion
- Foaled: 5 February 1978
- Country: United States
- Colour: Chestnut
- Breeder: George A. Bolas
- Owner: Khalid Abdullah; Deburgh & Golden Eagle Farm
- Trainer: Jeremy Tree; John Gosden
- Record: 28:9-6-3

Major wins
- Gimcrack Stakes (1980); Del Mar Handicap (1983); Tanforan Handicap (1983); Carleton F. Burke Handicap (1983); American Handicap (1984)

Awards
- Timeform rating: 119 (1980), 121 (1980), 122 (1981)

Bel Bolide was an American-bred Thoroughbred racehorse. He campaigned in Europe for three years, winning the Gimcrack Stakes in 1980. He had his greatest success when he returned to the United States, winning the Del Mar Handicap, Tanforan Handicap, Carleton F. Burke Handicap and American Handicap.

== Background ==
Bel Bolide was a chestnut horse with a white blaze and four white stockings bred in Kentucky by George A. Bolas. He was sired by Bold Bidder, who won 13 races and also sired the Kentucky Derby winners Spectacular Bid and Cannonade. As a yearling he was offered for sale and bought for $310,000 by representatives of the Saudi Prince Khalid Abdullah. The colt was sent to Britain to be trained by Jeremy Tree at Beckhampton in Wiltshire.

== Racing career ==
=== European career ===
Bel Bolide raced in Britain as a two-year-old in 1980, winning three of his six races including the Group Two Gimcrack Stakes. He also finished second in the Middle Park Stakes and the Richmond Stakes and third in the Coventry Stakes. Bel Bolide failed to win in five races in 1981, but finished third to To-Agori-Mou in both the 2000 Guineas and the St James's Palace Stakes. After failing to win in four races in 1982 he was sent to race in the United States.

=== American career ===
During his racing career in North America, Bel Bolide was trained by John Gosden. In 1983 he won five of his seven races including the Del Mar Handicap, Tanforan Handicap and Carleton F. Burke Handicap. In the following year he ran six times and won the American Handicap.

== Pedigree ==
Pedigree of Bel Bolide (USA), chestnut stallion, 1978
Sire Bold Bidder (USA) 1962	Bold Ruler (USA); 1954	Nasrullah	Nearco
Sire Bold Bidder (USA) 1962	Bold Ruler (USA); 1954	Nasrullah	Mumtaz Begum
Sire Bold Bidder (USA) 1962	Bold Ruler (USA); 1954	Miss Disco	Discovery
Sire Bold Bidder (USA) 1962	Bold Ruler (USA); 1954	Miss Disco	Outdone
Sire Bold Bidder (USA) 1962	High Bid (USA); 1956	To Market	Market Wise
Sire Bold Bidder (USA) 1962	High Bid (USA); 1956	To Market	Pretty Does
Sire Bold Bidder (USA) 1962	High Bid (USA); 1956	Stepping Stone	Princequillo
Sire Bold Bidder (USA) 1962	High Bid (USA); 1956	Stepping Stone	Step Across
Dam Lady Graustark (USA) 1969	Graustark (USA); 1963	Ribot	Tenerani
Dam Lady Graustark (USA) 1969	Graustark (USA); 1963	Ribot	Romanella
Dam Lady Graustark (USA) 1969	Graustark (USA); 1963	Flower Bowl	Alibhai
Dam Lady Graustark (USA) 1969	Graustark (USA); 1963	Flower Bowl	Flower Bed
Dam Lady Graustark (USA) 1969	Inyala (USA); 1963	My Babu	Djebel
Dam Lady Graustark (USA) 1969	Inyala (USA); 1963	My Babu	Perfume
Dam Lady Graustark (USA) 1969	Inyala (USA); 1963	Roman Ronda	The Rhymer
Dam Lady Graustark (USA) 1969	Inyala (USA); 1963	Roman Ronda	Roman Matron (Family 20)
