= Nodouble =

American-bred Thoroughbred racehorse

- Sire: Noholme
- Grandsire: Star Kingdom
- Dam: Abla-Jay
- Damsire: Double Jay
- Sex: Stallion
- Foaled: 1965
- Country: United States
- Colour: Chestnut
- Breeder: Verna Lea Farms
- Owner: Gene Goff
- Trainer: J. Bert Sonnier
- Record: 42: 13-11-5
- Earnings: US$846,749

Major wins
- Arkansas Derby (1968); Michigan Mile And One-Eighth Handicap (1968); Hawthorne Gold Cup Handicap (1968, 1969); Santa Anita Handicap (1969); Californian Stakes (1969); Brooklyn Handicap (1969); San Pasqual Handicap (1970); Metropolitan Handicap (1970)

Awards
- TRA American Champion Older Male Horse (1969, 1970); Leading sire in North America (1981)

Nodouble (1965–1990) was an American Thoroughbred racehorse and sire. In a career that lasted from 1967 to 1970, he won eleven races from across the country, including the Arkansas Derby, Hawthorne Gold Cup (twice) and the Santa Anita, Brooklyn and Metropolitan Handicaps. He was twice voted American Champion Older Male Horse by the Thoroughbred Racing Association. After retirement to stud, he became the leading sire in North America of 1981 and was also a notable broodmare sire.

== Background ==
Nodouble was a chestnut stallion, bred in Arkansas by oilman Gene Goff’s Verna Lea Farms. He was out of the mare Abla-Jay, who won eight races from 68 career starts and was bought by Goff in 1963 as a broodmare for $3,200, Her sire Double Jay was the 1946 American Champion Two-Year-Old Colt and a four-time Leading broodmare sire in North America. Nodouble's Australian-bred sire, Noholme, was the 1959 Australian Horse of the Year who took nearly a full second off the race record in winning the prestigious Cox Plate Noholme was purchased in July 1960 by Goff and brought to the United States where he raced until being retired to stud. Nodouble was trained by Bert Sonnier.

== Racing career ==
At age two, Nodouble was competitive in stakes races for his age group but did not record a significant win. As a three-year-old, he began to blossom into a consistently good runner. Nodouble had not been nominated for the 1968 U.S. Triple Crown series, but after he won the Arkansas Derby owner Goff paid a supplementary fee to enter the colt in the second leg, the Preakness Stakes. Nodouble finished third behind winner Forward Pass and went on that year to win the first of two straight editions of the Hawthorne Gold Cup Handicap and to defeat the great Damascus in the Michigan Mile And One-Eighth Handicap.

Racing at ages four and five, Nodouble was named American Champion Older Male Horse by the Thoroughbred Racing Association in both years. The rival Daily Racing Form award went to Arts and Letters in 1969 and Fort Marcy in 1970. His major win in 1969 was the richest race in California, the Santa Anita Handicap after earlier winning the Strub Stakes but being disqualified to second place. Traveling to the east coast, he won the Brooklyn Handicap and repeated in the Hawthorne Handicap. In addition, he ran second to Arts and Letters in the 1969 Woodward Stakes, Jockey Club Gold Cup and Metropolitan Handicap. In 1970, he started his campaign in California, where he won the San Pasqual Handicap in a track record time of 1:40 2/5 for 1 1/16 miles. Travelling back to New York, he won his final start: the prestigious Metropolitan Handicap while setting a new track record of 1:34 3/5 for the mile.

== Stud record ==
At the end of October 1970, Gene Goff retired Nodouble. In 1971, he began his first year at stud in California. After initially being unsuccessful both there and in Kentucky, Nodouble was moved to Florida to stand. He met immediate success while standing at Lasater Farm in Ocala, and by 1981 his progeny made him that year's Leading sire in North America. Some of Nodouble's prominent offspring includes:

- Double Discount (b. 1973) - set world record for 1¼ miles on turf
- No Class (b. 1974) - Canadian Horse Racing Hall of Fame, dam of eight foals of which seven raced. She produced six stakes winners, including four Canadian Champions
- Overskate (b. 1975) - Canadian Horse Racing Hall of Fame inductee who was voted a record nine Sovereign Awards
- Mairzy Doates (b. 1975) - filly who won Matchmaker Handicap (1981), New York Handicap (1981), Japan Cup (1981)
- Shocker T. (b. 1982) - filly, Grade 1 winner, Calder Race Course Hall of Fame inductee

Nodouble died in 1990 having sired 91 stakes race winners and was the broodmare sire of 89 stakes race winners.

== Pedigree ==
Pedigree of Nodouble, chestnut horse, foaled March 4, 1965
Sire Noholme II (AUS)	Star Kingdom (IRE)	Stardust (GB)	Hyperion (GB)
Sire Noholme II (AUS)	Star Kingdom (IRE)	Stardust (GB)	Sister Stella
Sire Noholme II (AUS)	Star Kingdom (IRE)	Impromptu	Concerto (GB)
Sire Noholme II (AUS)	Star Kingdom (IRE)	Impromptu	Thoughtless (GB)
Sire Noholme II (AUS)	Oceana	Columbo (GB)	Manna (GB)
Sire Noholme II (AUS)	Oceana	Columbo (GB)	Lady Nairne (GB)
Sire Noholme II (AUS)	Oceana	Orama (GB)	Diophon (GB)
Sire Noholme II (AUS)	Oceana	Orama (GB)	Cantelupe (GB)
Dam Abla-jay	Double Jay	Balladier	Black Toney
Dam Abla-jay	Double Jay	Balladier	Blue Warbler
Dam Abla-jay	Double Jay	Broomshot	Whisk Broom II
Dam Abla-jay	Double Jay	Broomshot	Centre Shot
Dam Abla-jay	Ablamucha	Don Bingo	Serio
Dam Abla-jay	Ablamucha	Don Bingo	Lirica
Dam Abla-jay	Ablamucha	Sweet Betty	Challenger II
Dam Abla-jay	Ablamucha	Sweet Betty	Betty Dalme (Family: A1)
