= Green Forest =

American-bred, French-trained Thoroughbred racehorse (1979–2000)

- Sire: Shecky Greene
- Grandsire: Noholme
- Dam: Tell Meno Lies
- Damsire: The Axe
- Sex: Stallion
- Foaled: 18 February 1979
- Died: 2000 (Aged 20-21)
- Country: United States
- Colour: Chestnut
- Breeder: James G. Bell
- Owner: Mahmoud Fustuq
- Trainer: Mitri Saliba
- Record: 10:5-2-0

Major wins
- Prix Morny (1981); Prix de la Salamandre (1981); Grand Critérium (1981); Prix du Moulin (1982)

Awards
- Top-rated European two-year-old (1981); Top-rated French-trained horse (1982); Timeform top-rated horse (1982); Timeform best miler (1982); Timeform rating: 130 (1981), 134 (1982)
- Last updated on 16 November 2022

Green Forest (18 February 1979 – 2000) was an American-bred, French-trained Thoroughbred racehorse and sire. The best colt of his generation in France at two and three years of age, and the best miler in Europe in 1982, he won five of his ten races in a track career which lasted from May 1981 until September 1982. In 1981, he won four races, including the Prix Morny, Prix de la Salamandre and Grand Critérium. In the following year, he ran poorly in the early part of the season but then produced his best performance to defeat a strong field in the Prix du Moulin. He was retired to stud at the end of 1982 and had moderate success as a sire of winners.

== Background ==
Green Forest was a chestnut horse with a white blaze and a white sock on his right forefoot bred by James G. Bell at the Jonabell Farm in Lexington, Kentucky. He was one of the best horses sired by Shecky Greene, the American Champion Sprint Horse on 1973. Green Forest's dam, Tell Meno Lies, also produced the Fair Grounds Oaks winner Honest and True and the Prix Perth winner Green Paradise. As a descendant of the broodmare Bold Irish, Tell Meno Lies was also related to Ruffian, Pine Bluff, and Fusaichi Pegasus.

In 1980, the yearling Green Forest was sent to the Fasig-Tipton Kentucky Selected Summer Sales and was sold for $100,000 to the Lebanese businessman and horse breeder Mahmoud Fustuq. The colt was sent to Europe where he was trained in France by Mitri Saliba. He was ridden in all of his major races by Alfred "Fredo" Gibert.

== Racing career ==
=== 1981: two-year-old season ===
Green Forest made his first appearance in the Prix de Debut over 800 metres at Maisons-Laffitte Racecourse in May and won narrowly from the Irish-bred Maelstrom Lake with the first two finishing well clear of the other runner. Green Forest did not race again until the Prix du Bois over 1000m at the same course in July. He failed to settle in the early stages and finished fourth behind Maelstrom Lake. He was then moved up in class to contest the Group One Prix Robert Papin over 1100m at Maisons-Laffitte later that month. Gibert successfully restrained the colt towards the rear of the field before producing a strong late run and failed by half a length to catch Maelstrom Lake.

In August, Green Forest and Maelstrom Lake met for the fourth time in the Group One Prix Morny over 1200m at Deauville Racecourse but were third and fourth in the betting behind the filly River Lady and the British challenger Tender King. Green Forest took the lead just after half way and won by three-quarters of a length and a head from Maelstrom Lake and River Lady. In September, he was moved up in distance for the Group One Prix de la Salamandre over 1400m on soft ground at Longchamp Racecourse in which he was opposed by the undefeated Zino and Prix du Calvados winner Exclusive Order. As in the Prix du Bois, Green Forest refused to settle for Gibert in the early stages but finished strongly to overtake Zino in the last 200m and won going away by one and a half lengths. In October, he moved up to 1600m for the Grand Critérium, France's most prestigious race for two-year-old colts. He started favourite against a field which included Royal Lodge Stakes winner Norwick and Prix La Rochette winner Persepolis. Green Forest took the lead in the straight and drew away to win by two and a half lengths from Norwick, who was six length clear of Rollins in third.

=== 1982: three-year-old season ===
Green Forest's form in the early part of 1982 was sub-par, possibly as a result of the fact that, like many of Fustok's horses he had been treated with excessive doses of a "worming vaccine" which disrupted his training. He made his debut in the Poule d'Essai des Poulains over 1600 metres at Longchamp on 25 April when he started favourite against eight opponents and finished fourth behind Melyno, Tampero, and Day Is Done. In the Prix Jean Prat over 1800 metres at Longchamp in June, he finished last of the five runners behind Melyno, Zino (who had won the 2000 Guineas), Be My Native, and Tampero. His performances led to speculation that he had either failed to "train on" (make the normal progress from two to three) or that he was "ungenuine".

Green Forest was off the racecourse for more than two months before he returned in the all-aged Prix Jacques Le Marois at Deauville Racecourse on 15 August. He took the lead in the straight and was caught in the closing stages and beaten three-quarters of a length by the four-year-old The Wonder. Zino finished third ahead of Exclusive Order and Noalcoholic, with the favoured Melyno eighth of the nine runners. Three weeks later, Green Forest ran in the Prix du Moulin at Longchamp against a field which included The Wonder, Melyno, and the British-trained favourite Sandhurst Prince, the winner of the Waterford Crystal Mile. The British colt set an extremely fast pace, which had many of the runners struggling at halfway, but Gibert settled Green Forest in third place before making his challenge 400m from the finish. Green Forest accelerated past Sandhurst Prince and quickly went clear of the field to win by three lengths. The Wonder finished strongly to deprive Sandhurst Prince of second place in the final strides.

After his win in the Moulin, there was speculation that Green Forest would run in either the Prix de la Forêt or the Champion Stakes, but he never raced again. Fustok proposed a $4 million match race between Green Forest and any American-trained colt to be run in two legs at Longchamp and Belmont Park. The connections of Timely Writer expressed some interest, but the match never materialised.

== Assessment ==
In the official International Classification for 1981, Green Forest was rated the best two-year-old in Europe, three pounds ahead of Dewhurst Stakes winner Wind and Wuthering. The independent Timeform organisation reversed the order, rating Wind and Wuthering on 132 and Green Forest on 130. In the International Classification for 1982, Green Forest was the highest-rated French-trained racehorse and the joint-second-best horse in Europe, one pound behind Golden Fleece and equal with Assert and Kalaglow. Timeform named him the best miler of the season, and his rating of 134 made him their equal top-rated horse alongside their "Horse of the Year" Ardross and their "best three-year-old colt" Assert.

== Stud record ==
Green Forest was retired from racing to become a breeding stallion at Jonabell Farm. Despite a promising start to his stud career, he was not a commercial success in USA.

By far his most successful offspring was the filly Forest Flower, from his first crop of foals, whose wins included the Irish 1000 Guineas. Other good winners included Made of Gold (Royal Lodge Stakes), Forest Wind (Mill Reef Stakes), and Green Line Express, who won at Group Three level and finished second to Zilzal in the Sussex Stakes.

Green Forest was exported to the Dashmesh Stud Farm in Punjab, India in 1995, where he sired the Multiple Classic winner Bonzer in his first Indian crop. Bonzer won 14 races including The Golconda Derby, Gr.1, Golconda 2000 Guineas Gr.2, Deccan Derby, Gr.1, The Bangalore St.Leger Gr.1, The President Of India Gold Cup, Gr.1, and Nizam's Gold Cup Gr.2. Green Forest also sired the Calcutta 2000 Guineas winner Antequera, the Deccan Derby winner Singh, and the Golconda Oaks winner Gisele. Star Of The Crop also won the Golconda Oaks, and his Royal Russian won the Bangalore Derby. Green Forest died in India in 2000. He has since become a fairly successful broodmare sire across the globe, and his son Made Of Gold has performed fairly well as a sire in Australia and New Zealand.

== Pedigree ==
Pedigree of Green Forest, chestnut stallion, 1979
Sire Shecky Greene (USA) 1970	Noholme (AUS); 1956	Star Kingdom	Stardust
Sire Shecky Greene (USA) 1970	Noholme (AUS); 1956	Star Kingdom	Impromptu
Sire Shecky Greene (USA) 1970	Noholme (AUS); 1956	Oceana	Colombo
Sire Shecky Greene (USA) 1970	Noholme (AUS); 1956	Oceana	Orama
Sire Shecky Greene (USA) 1970	Lester's Pride (USA); 1957	Model Cadet	Requested
Sire Shecky Greene (USA) 1970	Lester's Pride (USA); 1957	Model Cadet	Hadepine
Sire Shecky Greene (USA) 1970	Lester's Pride (USA); 1957	Meadow Flower	Bull Lea
Sire Shecky Greene (USA) 1970	Lester's Pride (USA); 1957	Meadow Flower	Spur Flower
Dam Tell Meno Lies (USA) 1971	The Axe (USA); 1958	Mahmoud	Blenheim
Dam Tell Meno Lies (USA) 1971	The Axe (USA); 1958	Mahmoud	Mah Mahal
Dam Tell Meno Lies (USA) 1971	The Axe (USA); 1958	Blackball	Shut Out
Dam Tell Meno Lies (USA) 1971	The Axe (USA); 1958	Blackball	Big Event
Dam Tell Meno Lies (USA) 1971	Filatonga (USA); 1960	Count of Honor	Count Fleet
Dam Tell Meno Lies (USA) 1971	Filatonga (USA); 1960	Count of Honor	Honor Bound
Dam Tell Meno Lies (USA) 1971	Filatonga (USA); 1960	Blarney Castle	Nasrullah
Dam Tell Meno Lies (USA) 1971	Filatonga (USA); 1960	Blarney Castle	Bold Irish (Family: 8-c)
