= Super Impose =

New Zealand-bred Thoroughbred racehorse

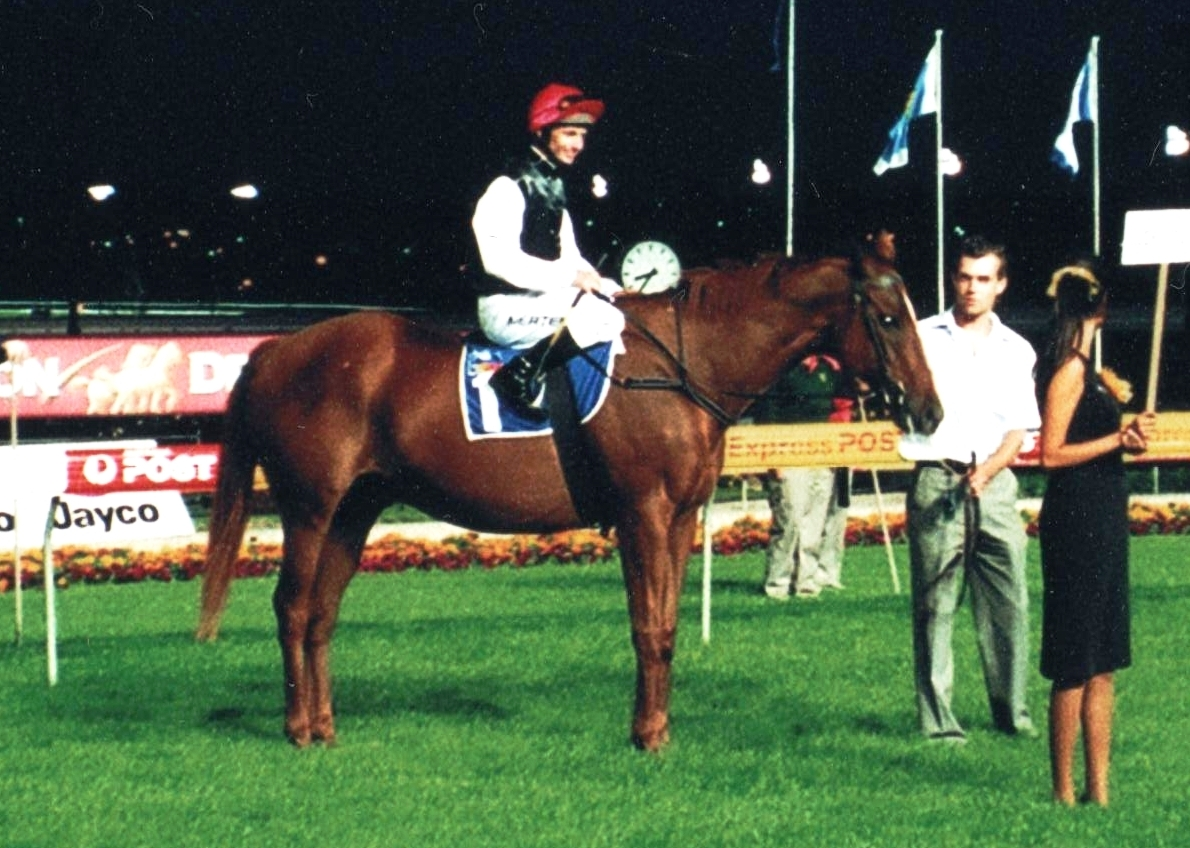
- Super Impose at the Night of Champions in 2005
- Sire: Imposing (AUS)
- Grandsire: Todman (AUS)
- Dam: Pheroz Fancy (NZ)
- Damsire: Taipan (USA)
- Sex: Gelding
- Foaled: 5 October 1984
- Died: 23 March 2007 (aged 22)
- Country: New Zealand
- Colour: Chestnut
- Breeder: John G. B. Grant (Meadowland Stud)
- Owner: Chris Biggins, G. Longbottom, J. Journeaux, R. Moffat, J. Newton, K. Fawcett
- Trainer: Lee Freedman
- Record: 74: 20-24-8
- Earnings: A$5,659,358

Major wins
- Eclipse Stakes (1988); AJC Summer Cup (1988); T.S. Carlyon Cup (1989); Turnbull Stakes (1989); Doncaster Handicap (1990, 1991); Epsom Handicap (1990, 1991); Warwick Stakes (1990, 1991); Chester Manifold Stakes (1991); Hill Stakes (1991); Ranvet Stakes (1991); Chipping Norton Stakes (1991, 1992); Canberra Cup (1992); W S Cox Plate (1992)

Honours
- Australian Racing Hall of Fame (2007); Super Impose Bar at Randwick Racecourse
- Last updated on 6 November 2009

Super Impose (5 October 1984 – 23 March 2007) was a New Zealand-bred Thoroughbred racehorse who was inducted into the Australian Racing Hall of Fame. In a career spanning 74 starts, he won eight Group One races and a then Australasian record $5.6 million in prize money. Trained throughout his career by Lee Freedman and ridden in his Group One wins by Bruce Compton (once), Darren Gauci (once), Darren Beadman (five times), and Greg Hall (once), Super Impose won the AJC Epsom and Doncaster Handicaps two years in a row, in 1990 and 1991, and won the Cox Plate at his penultimate start as an eight-year-old in 1992.

== Breeding ==
Foaled in New Zealand, Super Impose was a son of the multiple Group One winner Imposing (Todman-Hialeah), out of the unraced mare Pheroz Fancy (Taipan II-Pheroz Jewel). Pheroz Jewel was a stakeswinning mare in New Zealand who defeated Grey Way, while Todman was an Australian racehorse who won the inaugural Golden Slipper in 1957. Super Impose, via Todman and Ritmar (dam of Taipan), had Star Kingdom blood on both sides of his pedigree. The imported Irish stallion was a dominant influence on Australian racing before the preponderance of Northern Dancer-line stallions, such as Danehill, in the 1990s. Taipan, via his sire Bold Ruler, also introduced powerful American-bred descendants of Nearco into the pedigree. Super Impose descended from an old colonial New Zealand family, (C-23), that had not produced many notable winners until the last few decades.

== The beginnings (1986–1987) ==
The chestnut Super Impose was selected by trainer Lee Freedman at the 1986 Trentham yearling sales in New Zealand for a small syndicate who paid $40,000. Interviewed for 'Super Better Best', along with Lee Freedman, managing part-owner Chris Biggins explained that Freedman had rung him from New Zealand and said that there were three horses he had liked at the sale. Freedman predicted that the first two would make 'too much money', while the third was a 'beautiful, Imposing horse'. The first two were sold to Bart Cummings and became the multiple Group One winners Sky Chase and Beau Zam, while the third became Super Impose. He was unraced as a two-year-old.

== Racing record ==
=== Three-year-old season (1987–1988) ===
Super Impose entered training as a three-year-old and made a winning debut in a maiden at Seymour, on 28 December 1987. His next five starts produced three seconds and a third before a let-up. He resumed at Benalla, in early May with a win in an improvers, and his next three starts included a second in a three-year-old handicap at Flemington. Super Impose was yet to win a metropolitan race, but, in coming from last at Flemington, had shown a glimpse of his 'preferred racing style'. He had also shown a dislike for rain-affected going.

=== Four-year-old season (1988–1989) ===
Super Impose again resumed at Seymour, in early September, and finished third in a progressive. His next five starts produced as many defeats but included seconds in the Grey-Smith Stakes and the Ballarat Cup. At his next start, Super Impose broke a nine-race losing run and recorded his first Black Type win in the Eclipse Stakes. He was then taken to Sydney for the first time, where he won a welter at Rosehill (over 1,900 metres) and backed-up nine days later to win the AJC Summer Cup on Boxing Day. By this point, the Freedman stable knew that they had 'a pretty smart handicap type horse' on their hands.

Back in Melbourne, in the new year, Super Impose raced at weight-for-age for the first time, finishing second to Vo Rogue in the Orr Stakes, the St George Stakes, and the Australian Cup, and won the Carlyon Cup (under handicap conditions) in course-record time. In Sydney, wet weather forced him out of his races over the autumn carnival, including the Mercedes Classic, and the 'dark clouds followed his float' to Queensland, where he was unplaced in two starts before a spell.

=== Five-year-old season (1989–1990) ===
In a campaign leading to the Melbourne Cup, Super Impose resumed at Sandown in late August and, after defeats by Apollo Run, Painted Ocean, and Almaarad, broke through in the Turnbull Stakes at his fifth run back. He defeated Research and finished in front of Vo Rogue for the first time. This was followed by midfield finishes in the Caulfield Stakes and the Caulfield Cup and a fourth behind Horlicks in the Mackinnon Stakes. Super Impose carried second-topweight of 56 kilograms in the Melbourne Cup, and, according to Lee Freedman, turned in one of his 'greatest performances'. Freedman recalled that jockey Darren Gauci made 'the best possible use of an inside barrier, got out, had the race won' and was only beaten by Tawrrific, who was 'a little bit better weighted on the day' and 'better equipped' for the distance (3,200 metres).

Super Impose opened the new year with a string of placings and was scratched from his main mission, the Mercedes Classic, when wet weather again closed in on Sydney's autumn carnival. He was entered a week later in the Doncaster Handicap carrying topweight of 57 kilograms, and 'the weather held'. Super Impose came from the tail of the field on the home turn to defeat Shaftesbury Avenue. He was ridden in the Doncaster by Bruce Compton, who gained the ride only after higher-profile jockeys had taken other mounts, with doubts over whether Super Impose would take his place in the field. This was Compton's first and only ride on the horse, but his tactics and the horse's 'amazing zip' provided a template for success in the big Randwick 'mile' races over the next 18 months.

=== Six-year-old season (1990–1991) ===
Super Impose resumed in the Warwick Stakes in late August and defeated Eastern Classic - coincidentally, a horse he had finished second to, as a virtual unknown, almost two years earlier. Super Impose was then runner-up to Stargazer and Shaftesbury Avenue in his next two starts before taking his place in the Epsom Handicap with topweight of 58.5 kilograms. As was the case in the Doncaster Handicap, he was near the tail of the field on the home turn but came down the outside 'like a bullet' to overhaul a line of leaders over the closing stages, including Our Poverty Bay and Ricochet Rosie. Taken to Melbourne to prepare for the Cox Plate, Super Impose's campaign ended abruptly when he bled in the Caulfield Stakes and incurred an automatic three-month ban. The ban also meant that connections were unable to accept the Japan Racing Association's invitation to compete in the Japan Cup. Ultimately, Better Loosen Up won both races and took an unassailable lead in Horse of the Year calculations.

Facing the prospect of a lifetime ban from Australian racing if he bled for a second time, Super Impose reappeared in the new year and won one of his three starts - the Chester Manifold Stakes - in Melbourne. In Sydney, he won the Chipping Norton and the Ranvet Stakes for new jockey Darren Beadman and appeared to be back to his best. Super Impose then stunned the racing community by finishing 'stone-motherless' last of six in the Mercedes Classic. Then chief steward John Schreck explained that they had considered ordering Super Impose to barrier trial before being permitted to race again. Instead, their vets monitored the horse in the lead-up to the Doncaster Handicap, and 'fortunately, everything went right'. Super Impose won the Doncaster Handicap and had his final start for the season when runner-up to Shaftesbury Avenue in the All-Aged Stakes.

Super Impose had had the best season of his career, with four Group One wins, including the Epsom and Doncaster Handicaps, and his dam, Pheroz Fancy, was named New Zealand Broodmare of the Year in 1991.

=== Seven-year-old-season (1991–1992) ===
Now a veteran of 53 starts, Super Impose again resumed in the Warwick Stakes and defeated Livistona Lane and Royal Creation before an unplaced run in the Chelmsford Stakes and a win in the Hill Stakes (which was run at Canterbury Park, with its usual venue, Rosehill, closed for renovations). At his next start, with his win in the Epsom Handicap, Super Impose created history in winning the AJC's Epsom and Doncaster Handicaps two years in a row, in 1990 and 1991. In a moment of "insanity bordering on genius", Darren Beadman switched Super Impose back to the inside, and he weaved through the field, emerging over the closing stages to veteran racecaller John Tapp's cry of "He's going to do it, it's history at Randwick!" In winning each of these races for the second time, he also set modern-day weight-carrying records of 61 kilograms in the Epsom Handicap and 59.5 kilograms in the Doncaster Handicap. Following these wins, Super Impose was named Australia’s "Greatest Miler" by racing author Warwick Hobson, and the club named a bar in his honour in the public grandstand at Randwick Racecourse.

After the Epsom Handicap, Super Impose campaigned in Melbourne and finished second to Shaftesbury Avenue, Surfers Paradise, and Let’s Elope in the Caulfield Stakes, the Cox Plate, and the Mackinnon Stakes, respectively. He then finished fourth in the Melbourne Cup under topweight of 60 kilograms and gave nine kilograms to the winner, Let's Elope.

Super Impose opened the new year with a second placing to Quick Score in the Apollo Stakes and defeated him second-up with a rails-hugging win in the Chipping Norton Stakes (both run at Randwick Racecourse, instead of their usual venue, Warwick Farm). He was then unplaced in the last four runs of his campaign, including the Doncaster Handicap, where he finished sixth under topweight of 62.5 kilograms and gave 15 kilograms to the winner, Soho Square.

=== Eight-year-old season (1992–1993) ===
In his final campaign, Super Impose again resumed in the Warwick Stakes but was denied a record-equalling third win in the race by Shaftesbury Avenue - who was appearing for the first time since the previous year's Japan Cup and never raced again. Super Impose was then placed in the Chelmsford Stakes and the Hill Stakes, and finished fourth in the Epsom Handicap, under topweight of 61.5 kilograms. He broke an eight-race losing run in the Canberra Cup on his way to Melbourne for the Cox Plate. So easy was the win in that his jockey, Mick Dittman, slowed Super Impose to cantering pace approaching the finish line, more than three lengths clear of the runner-up.

In the Cox Plate, veteran jockey Greg Hall took the ride on Super Impose, with Mick Dittman booked to ride the hot favourite, Naturalism. The 'stellar field' of 14 included 12 multiple Group One winners. Kinjite and Slight Chance alternated in the lead, with Naturalism drifting toward midfield, and Let’s Elope, Better Loosen Up, and Super Impose near the rear. The pace was slow, and the field was tightly packed entering the final 800 metres. Suddenly, Palace Reign clipped heels, and put Naturalism, Sydeston, and Rough Habit out of the race in a chain reaction, while the remainder of the field made for the home turn. Let’s Elope loomed up with 'a mighty run out wide', stalked by Super Impose, with Better Loosen Up in a pocket to the inside. Better Loosen Up had to check when Let’s Elope rolled in, and Super Impose came at the leaders to Bryan Martin's call of 'Super! I think Super Impose a nose to Let’s Elope in the Cox Plate'.

The win took Super Impose to an Australasian record $5.6 million in prize money and gave him the rare feat of Group wins at each of the eight city racetracks in Sydney and Melbourne. He finished his career with a 15th placing in Subzero's Melbourne Cup, 10 days later, but fans simply displayed the reverse-side of their giant banner, which read 'Bad luck Super. We still love you'. He was officially retired in February 1993.

== In retirement (1993–2007) ==
Super Impose made guest appearances at various racetracks, including Randwick for the Epsom and Doncaster Handicap parades, and Moonee Valley for a Night of Champions in 2005 with Subzero, Doriemus, Saintly, and Brew. He appeared small later in life due to a sway back, common in old horses, but enjoyed running in the paddocks of Glenlogan Park Stud in Queensland as a 'nanny' to some of the farm's young horses.

Due to infirmities associated with old age, Super Impose was humanely euthanised in 2007 at the age of 22. He was buried at Glenlogan Park Stud with a tribute stone and plaque erected in his memory.

In 2007, Super Impose was posthumously inducted into the Australian Racing Hall of Fame.

== Pedigree ==
Pedigree of Super Impose (NZ) (C-23) Ch.g. 1984
Sire Imposing (AUS) 1975	Todman; Ch. 1954	Star Kingdom* (IRE) 1946	Stardust* (GB)
Sire Imposing (AUS) 1975	Todman; Ch. 1954	Star Kingdom* (IRE) 1946	Impromptu* (IRE)
Sire Imposing (AUS) 1975	Todman; Ch. 1954	Oceana (GB) 1947	Colombo (GB)
Sire Imposing (AUS) 1975	Todman; Ch. 1954	Oceana (GB) 1947	Orama (GB)
Sire Imposing (AUS) 1975	Hialeah; 1963	Arctic Explorer (GB) 1954	Arctic Prince (GB)
Sire Imposing (AUS) 1975	Hialeah; 1963	Arctic Explorer (GB) 1954	Flirting (GB)
Sire Imposing (AUS) 1975	Hialeah; 1963	Kuch Parwani (AUS) 1957	Landau (IRE)
Sire Imposing (AUS) 1975	Hialeah; 1963	Kuch Parwani (AUS) 1957	Resignation (AUS)
Dam Pheroz Fancy (NZ) 1978	Taipan (USA); 1963	Bold Ruler (USA) 1954	Nasrullah* (IRE)
Dam Pheroz Fancy (NZ) 1978	Taipan (USA); 1963	Bold Ruler (USA) 1954	Miss Disco (USA)
Dam Pheroz Fancy (NZ) 1978	Taipan (USA); 1963	Ritmar (AUS) 1956	Star Kingdom* (IRE)
Dam Pheroz Fancy (NZ) 1978	Taipan (USA); 1963	Ritmar (AUS) 1956	Magic Ring (NZ)
Dam Pheroz Fancy (NZ) 1978	Pheroz Jewel; 1970	Pakistan II (GB) 1958	Palestine (GB)
Dam Pheroz Fancy (NZ) 1978	Pheroz Jewel; 1970	Pakistan II (GB) 1958	Tambara* (GB)
Dam Pheroz Fancy (NZ) 1978	Pheroz Jewel; 1970	Pheroz Pride (NZ) 1962	Alcimedes (GB)
Dam Pheroz Fancy (NZ) 1978	Pheroz Jewel; 1970	Pheroz Pride (NZ) 1962	Pheroz Girl (NZ)

* Super Impose is inbred 3S x 4D to the stallion Star Kingdom, meaning that he appears third generation on the sire side of his pedigree, and fourth generation on the dam side of his pedigree.

* Super Impose is inbred 4D x 5D to the stallion Nasrullah, meaning that he appears fourth generation and fifth generation (via Tambara) on the dam side of his pedigree.
