= Carleton F. Burke Handicap =

Horse race in California, US

- Class: Discontinued stakes
- Location: Santa Anita Park; Arcadia, California, United States
- Inaugurated: 1969
- Race type: Thoroughbred - Flat racing
- Website: www.oaktreeracing.com

Race information
- Distance: 1 1/2 miles (12 furlongs)
- Surface: Turf
- Track: Left-handed
- Qualification: Three-year-olds & up
- Weight: Assigned
- Purse: $100,000 added

The Carleton F. Burke Handicap is an American Thoroughbred horse race run annually at Santa Anita Park in Arcadia, California. Raced in late October as part of the Oak Tree Racing Association series, it is open to horses age three and older and is contested on turf at a distance of one-and-one-half miles (twelve furlongs). The race is named in honor of Carleton F. Burke, the first chairman of the California Horse Racing Board (CHRB) who later served as the Director of Racing at Santa Anita Park.

From inception in 1969 through 1994, the Carleton F. Burke Handicap was raced at 1 1/4 miles. It was run in two divisions in 1975 and 1978.

A Grade I event as recently as 1989, the Carleton F. Burke Handicap held a Grade III classification until 2011. The race was not run in 2008 and 2009 in order to accommodate the Breeders' Cup races. When the Santa Anita fall meet was moved to Hollywood Park in 2010, the race was not run again. As a result, the American Graded Stakes Committee announced that the race was not eligible for grading in 2011. If a race is not run for two consecutive years, it is not eligible for grading.

On October 9, 1977, Double Discount won this race in a world record time of 1:57 2/5 for 1 1/4 miles on turf.

== Records ==
Speed record:

- 2:24.13 - Spring House (2007) (at current distance of 1 1/2 miles)
- 1:57.40 - Double Discount (1977) (World Record at previous distance of 1 1/4 miles)

Most wins:

- 2 - Fiddle Isle (1969, 1970)

Most wins by an owner:

- 3 - Howard B. Keck (1969, 1970, 1974)

Most wins by a jockey:

- 7 - Bill Shoemaker (1969, 1970, 1975, 1976, 1978, 1980, 1986)

Most wins by a trainer:

- 11 - Charles Whittingham (1969, 1970, 1972, 1974, 1975, 1976, 1978, 1980, 1986, 1987, 1988)

== Winners ==
Year	Winner	Age	Jockey	Trainer	Owner	Time
2007	Spring House	5	Garrett Gomez	Julio C. Canani	Randall D. Hubbard	2:24.13
2006	Symphony Sid	6	Michael Baze	Mike Mitchell	Bongo Racing et al.	2:24.18
2005	Golden Rahy	6	Alex Solis	Robert J. Frankel	J. T. Alverez III Trust	2:27.02
2004	Habaneros	5	David Flores	Thomas Bell	John C. Bell	2:26.91
2003	Runaway Dancer	4	Mike E. Smith	Dan L. Hendricks	R L Stables	2:28.36
2002	Special Matter	4	Tyler Baze	Rafael Becerra	McClintock, Elder et al.	2:28.47
2001	Cagney	4	Mike E. Smith	Richard Mandella	TNT Stud	2:26.10
2000	Timboroa	4	David Flores	Robert J. Frankel	Edmund A. Gann	2:27.91
1999	Public Purse	5	Alex Solis	Robert J. Frankel	Juddmonte Farms	2:25.83
1998	Perim	5	Brice Blanc	Darrell Vienna	Red Baron's Barn	2:29.29
1997	Prussian Blue	5	Kent Desormeaux	Jean-Pierre Dupuis	Harlequin Ranches/Diane Keith	2:31.37
1996	Dernier Empereur	6	Chris McCarron	Ben D. A. Cecil	Gary A. Tanaka	2:24.24
1995	Varadavour	6	Alex Solis	Mike Puype	Frank J. Gogliano	2:30.27
1994	Savinio	4	Chris McCarron	Walter Greenman	Biszantz et al.	2:02.69
1993	Know Heights	4	Kent Desormeaux	Robert B. Hess Jr.	Jeremys Stable et al.	2:00.77
1992	Missionary Ridge	5	Kent Desormeaux	Robert J. Frankel	Peter Wall	2:00.89
1991	Super May	5	Corey Nakatani	Richard E. Mandella	Jack Kent Cooke	1:58.58
1990	Ultrasonido †	5	Chris McCarron	Ron McAnally	M/M Frank E. Whitham	1:59.80
1989	Alwuhush	4	José A. Santos	Angel Penna Sr.	Frank Stronach	1:58.00
1988	Nasr El Arab	3	Gary Stevens	Charles Whittingham	Sheikh Mohammed	2:01.00
1987	Rivlia	5	Laffit Pincay Jr.	Charles Whittingham	Nelson Bunker Hunt	2:03.20
1986	Louis Le Grand	4	Bill Shoemaker	Charles Whittingham	Allen E. Paulson	2:01.20
1985	Tsunami Slew	4	Gary Stevens	Eddie Gregson	Royal Lines (Lessee)	1:59.60
1984	Silveyville	6	Chris McCarron	Bruce Headley	Kjell H. Qvale	1:59.60
1983	Bel Bolide	5	Terry Lipham	John Gosden	Stonechurch Stable	2:01.20
1982	Mehmet	4	Ed Delahoussaye	Robert J. Frankel	Chlad/Chlad/Mevorach/Vallone	1:58.60
1981	Spence Bay	6	Fernando Toro	Randy Winick	Edward Trotta	2:00.60
1980	Bold Tropic	5	Bill Shoemaker	Charles Whittingham	M/M. Cyril Hurvitz	1:58.20
1979	Silver Eagle	5	Fernando Toro	Thomas R. Bell Jr.	Gayno Stable et al.	1:59.20
1978	Star of Erin II	4	Bill Shoemaker	Charles Whittingham	M/M Quinn Martin	1:59.00
1978	Palton	5	Henry E. Moreno	Henry M. Moreno	Pinetree Stable	1:59.00
1977	Double Discount	4	Francisco Mena	Melvin F. Stute	The Hat Ranch	1:57.40
1976	King Pellinore	4	Bill Shoemaker	Charles Whittingham	Cardiff Stock Farm	1:57.60
1975	Top Command	4	Bill Shoemaker	Charles Whittingham	M/M Q. Martin/Murty Farm	2:01.20
1975	Kirrary	5	Francisco Mena	Paul E. Meredith	Jocoy, Meredith & Ward	2:00.40
1974	Tallahto	4	Laffit Pincay Jr.	Charles Whittingham	Howard B. Keck	1:59.00
1973	Kentuckian †	4	Donald Pierce	Jerry M. Fanning	Dan Agnew	1:59.00
1972	Cougar II	6	Donald Pierce	Charles Whittingham	Mary Jones Bradley	2:00.20
1971	Kobuk King	5	Howard Grant	Ron McAnally	Allegre Stable/McAnally	1:59.60
1970	Fiddle Isle	5	Bill Shoemaker	Charles Whittingham	Howard B. Keck	1:58.80
1969	Fiddle Isle	4	Bill Shoemaker	Charles Whittingham	Howard B. Keck	1:59.80

- † In 1973, Groshawk finished first but was disqualified and set back to fifth. In 1990, Rial finished first but was disqualified and set back second.
