= Sweet Embrace Stakes =

- Class: Group 2
- Location: Randwick Racecourse, Sydney, Australia
- Inaugurated: 1979
- Race type: Thoroughbred - flat
- Sponsor: Sintoro

Race information
- Distance: 1,200 metres
- Surface: Turf
- Track: Right-handed
- Qualification: Two-year-old fillies
- Weight: Set weights 55 1/2 kg
- Purse: A$300,000 (2026)
- Bonuses: Automatic entry to the Golden Slipper Stakes

The Sweet Embrace Stakes is an Australian Turf Club Group 2 Thoroughbred horse race for fillies aged two years old, over a distance of 1200 metres at Randwick Racecourse in Sydney, Australia in late February or early March.

The winner of this race receives automatic entry to the Golden Slipper Stakes.

== History ==
The race is named in honour of Sweet Embrace, winner of the 1967 Golden Slipper Stakes. Fillies that have captured the Sweet Embrace – Golden Slipper double include:

- Dark Eclipse (1980)
- Ha Ha (2001)
- Crystal Lily (2010)
- Fireburn (2022).

Jason Collett was the winning rider in 2014, 2022 and 2025. Hugh Bowman won in 2012, 2018 and 2023.

=== Name ===
- 1979–1998 - Sweet Embrace Stakes
- 1999 - Lone Star Steakhouse and Saloon Stakes
- 2000 onwards - Sweet Embrace Stakes

=== Venue ===
- Before 1995 - Canterbury Park Racecourse
- 1996–1999 - Rosehill Gardens Racecourse
- 2000–2005 - Canterbury Park Racecourse
- 2006–2010 - Randwick Racecourse
- 2011 - Warwick Farm Racecourse
- 2012 - Randwick Racecourse
- 2013 - Warwick Farm Racecourse
- 2014 - Randwick Racecourse
- 2015 - Warwick Farm Racecourse
- 2016 onwards - Randwick Racecourse

=== Grade ===
- 1979–1986 - Listed Race
- 1987–2012 - Group 3
- 2013 onwards - Group 2

== Winners ==
The following are past winners of the race.

- 2026 - Spicy Miss
- 2025 - Within The Law
- 2024 - Manaal
- 2023 - Lazzago
- 2022 - Fireburn
- 2021 - Four Moves Ahead
- 2020 - Hungry Heart
- 2019 - Anaheed
- 2018 - Seabrook
- 2017 - One More Honey
- 2016 - Scarlet Rain
- 2015 - Always Allison
- 2014 - Believe Yourself
- 2013 - Romantic Moon
- 2012 - Jade Marauder
- 2011 - Shared Reflections
- 2010 - Crystal Lily
- 2009 - Headway
- 2008 - Stripper
- 2007 - Chinchilla Rose
- 2006 - Universal Queen
- 2005 - Carry On Cutie
- 2004 - Burning Sands
- 2003 - Legally Bay
- 2002 - Victory Vein
- 2001 - Ha Ha
- 2000 - Dynamic Love
- 1999 - Countess Christie
- 1998 - Rubicall
- 1997 - All The Chat
- 1996 - Flapper
- 1995 - Millrich
- 1994 - Shadowy Outline
- 1993 - Rock Review
- 1992 - Skating
- 1991 - Shadea
- 1990 - Paklani
- 1989 - A Little Kiss
- 1988 - Scollata
- 1987 - Postage Due
- 1986 - Khaptivaan
- 1985 - Speed Check
- 1984 - Vain Display
- 1983 - Purpose
- 1982 - Jade Lace
- 1981 - Black Shoes
- 1980 - Dark Eclipse
- 1979 - Ingenue

== See also ==
- List of Australian Group races
- Group races
