= Wakataka (horse) =

Japanese racehorse (1929–1945)

Wakataka ワカタカ
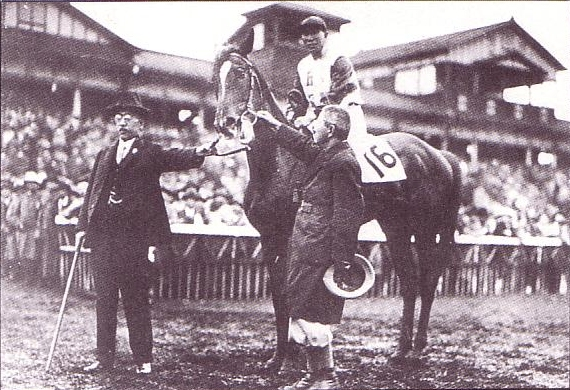
- Wakataka at Meguro Racecourse on April 24, 1932
- Breed: Thoroughbred-type
- Sire: Tournesol
- Grandsire: Gainsborough
- Dam: Taneshin
- Damsire: Ebor
- Sex: Stallion
- Foaled: 17 March 1929
- Died: 10 March 1945 (aged 15); Shinhidaka, Hokkaido, Japan
- Country: Japan
- Colour: Chestnut
- Breeder: Shimosa Imperial Stock Farm
- Owner: Kenichi Inui
- Trainer: Tamazo Higashihara
- Jockey: Magsaku Hakodate
- Record: 21: 12-5-2
- Earnings: ¥73,698

Major wins
- Tokyo Yushun (1932)

Wakataka (Japanese: ワカタカ, Hepburn: Wakataka; 17 March 1929 – 10 March 1945) was a Japanese Thoroughbred-type racehorse. He competed from 1932 to 1933, recording twelve wins in twenty-one starts. He won the inaugural running of the Tokyo Yushun Dai Kyoso (Japanese Derby) on April 24, 1932, becoming the first horse to win the race. He was a grandson of the English Triple Crown winner Gainsborough.

== Background ==
Wakataka was a chestnut horse bred at the Shimosa Imperial Stock Farm (下総御料牧場) in Inba District, Chiba Prefecture. His birth name (幼名) was "Asashin" (朝信). He was sired by Tournesol, a British-bred son of the English Triple Crown winner Gainsborough who had been imported to Japan; Wakataka was from his first crop. His dam was Taneshin (種信), a Thoroughbred-type mare by the imported stallion Ebor, whose granddam was Mira (ミラ), a foundational broodmare of early Japanese racing. His racing name combines "Waka" (young) with "Taka" (hawk). He was owned by Kenichi Inui, one of the founders of Nakayama Racecourse, and sent into training with Tamazo Higashihara at Nakayama. His regular jockey was Magsaku Hakodate, who rode him in all twenty-one of his races.

== Racing career ==
=== 1932: Three-year-old season ===
Wakataka debuted on March 26, 1932, at Nakayama Racecourse, finishing fifth. Three weeks later, he won a maiden race at the Meguro Racecourse in Tokyo by ten lengths on a muddy track.

On April 24, he contested the inaugural Tokyo Yushun Dai Kyoso at the Meguro Racecourse, the predecessor of the modern Tōkyō Yūshun. The race was broadcast nationally by NHK Radio 1. Ridden by Magosaku Hakodate, he was the 1.95-to-1 favourite in a field of nineteen. He took the lead from the start and won by four lengths over Otsukayama in a time of 2:45.4 on a heavy track, becoming the first Japanese Derby winner.

He went on to win six more races in 1932, including the Teishitsu Goshoten (Imperial Prize) at Tokyo, the Yokohama Tokubetsu (Yokohama Special) at Yokohama Racecourse, and the Norinsho Shoten Kyoso (Ministry of Agriculture and Forestry Prize) at Tokyo, setting course records in the latter two.

=== 1933: Four-year-old season ===
Wakataka won five races in 1933. In his final three starts on December 1, 2, and 3, he carried weights of 71 to 73 kilograms and recorded two wins and one second place over three consecutive days.

== Statistics ==
The following table details all 21 starts of Wakataka's racing career based on historical records from the Nihon Derby 50-nen Shi and Imai 1987.

Date	Distance (Condition)	Race	Course	Odds (Favourite)	Field	Finish	Time	Jockey	Winning (Losing) Margin	Winner (2nd Place)	Ref
1932 – three-year-old season
Mar 26	Turf 1800 m (Firm)	Shin Ko	Nakayama	(1st)	11	5th	–	Magosaku Hakodate	–	Thunder Clap	
Apr 16	Turf 2000 m (Muddy)	Shin Ko	Tokyo (Meguro)	(1st)	11	1st	2:11.0	Magosaku Hakodate	–10.0	(Hakusetsu)	
Apr 24	Turf 2400 m (Heavy)	Tokyo Yushun Dai Kyoso	Tokyo (Meguro)	1.95 (1st)	19	1st	2:45.4	Magosaku Hakodate	–4.0	(Otsukayama)	
Oct 1	Turf 2000 m (Muddy)	All Comer Handicap	Yokohama	(1st)	8	3rd	2:11.4	Magosaku Hakodate	–	Yamayasu	
Oct 3	Turf 2000 m (Muddy)	Ko Ba	Yokohama	(2nd)	4	1st	2:09.2	Magosaku Hakodate	–8.0	(Otsukayama)	
Oct 9	Turf 3200 m (Heavy)	Yokohama Tokubetsu	Yokohama	(1st)	5	1st	R3:29.2	Magosaku Hakodate	–8.0	(Asaha)	
Oct 23	Turf 2000 m (Firm)	Teishitsu Goshoten	Tokyo (Meguro)	(1st)	5	1st	2:07.4	Magosaku Hakodate	–2.5	(Ascot)	
Oct 30	Turf 3200 m (Firm)	Norinsho Shoten Kyoso	Tokyo (Meguro)	(1st)	5	1st	R3:26.4	Magosaku Hakodate	–2.0	(Hakusetsu)	
Nov 26	Turf 2000 m (Firm)	Ko Ko Ba Tokushu Handicap	Nakayama	(1st)	8	1st	R2:07.4	Magosaku Hakodate	–0.1	(Ascot)	
Nov 27	Turf 2400 m (Heavy)	Nakayama 4-Y-O Tokubetsu	Nakayama	(1st)	6	2nd	2:39.6	Magosaku Hakodate	0.1	Hakuko	
Dec 4	Turf 2600 m (Firm)	Yusho	Nakayama	(1st)	8	3rd	–	Magosaku Hakodate	6.0	Zenso	
1933 – four-year-old season
Oct 7	Turf 1800 m (Firm)	Ko Ba	Yokohama	(2nd)	8	1st	1:55.2	Magosaku Hakodate	–3.5	(King Doser)	
Oct 22	Turf 2400 m (Muddy)	Yusho	Yokohama	(2nd)	5	2nd	–	Magosaku Hakodate	6.0	Hakuko	
Oct 28	Turf 2000 m (Firm)	Ko Ko Ba Tokushu Handicap	Nakayama	(5th)	12	12th	–	Magosaku Hakodate	–	Hakusetsu	
Nov 3	Turf 1800 m (Muddy)	Ko Ba Handicap	Nakayama	(1st)	11	1st	1:56.6	Magosaku Hakodate	–4.0	(Iwaume)	
Nov 5	Turf 3200 m (Firm)	Nakayama Autumn 5-Y-O Tokubetsu	Nakayama	(2nd)	4	2nd	–	Magosaku Hakodate	2.5	Hakuko	
Nov 11	Turf 2600 m (Heavy)	Yusho	Nakayama	(2nd)	8	1st	2:55.0	Magosaku Hakodate	–2.5	(Happy Land)	
Nov 25	Turf 2400 m (Firm)	5-Y-O Tokubetsu	Tokyo (Meguro)	(1st)	11	2nd	–	Magosaku Hakodate	1.5	Hakusetsu	
Dec 1	Turf 1800 m (Heavy)	Shin Ko Handicap	Tokyo (Meguro)	(1st)	11	2nd	–	Magosaku Hakodate	0.5	Isahaya	
Dec 2	Turf 1800 m (Heavy)	Shin Ko	Tokyo (Meguro)	(1st)	6	1st	2:03.2	Magosaku Hakodate	–2.0	(Artful)	
Dec 3	Turf 2600 m (Muddy)	Yusho	Tokyo (Meguro)	(2nd)	8	1st	2:55.0	Magosaku Hakodate	–5.0	(Kikunohana)	

== Post-racing career and death ==
Following his retirement, Wakataka became a national stallion at the Hidaka Stock Farm (日高種馬牧場). However, as a Thoroughbred-type horse, demand was limited; most of his mares were intermediate breeds used as military horses, and his representative offspring competed in Arab horse races. He was retired from stud duty in 1943 and subsequently used as a riding horse at the Shizunai Agricultural School (静内農学校, now Hokkaido Shizunai High School). He died of chronic pulmonary emphysema on March 10, 1945. His remains were buried beneath the animal memorial monument on the school grounds.

== Pedigree ==
Pedigree of Wakataka (JPN)
Sire Tournesol (GB) 1922	Gainsborough (GB); 1915	Bayardo	Bay Ronald
Sire Tournesol (GB) 1922	Gainsborough (GB); 1915	Bayardo	Galicia
Sire Tournesol (GB) 1922	Gainsborough (GB); 1915	Rosedrop	St. Frusquin
Sire Tournesol (GB) 1922	Gainsborough (GB); 1915	Rosedrop	Rosaline
Sire Tournesol (GB) 1922	Soliste (GB); 1910	Prince William	Bill of Portland
Sire Tournesol (GB) 1922	Soliste (GB); 1910	Prince William	La Vierge
Sire Tournesol (GB) 1922	Soliste (GB); 1910	Sees	Chesterfield
Sire Tournesol (GB) 1922	Soliste (GB); 1910	Sees	La Goulue
Dam Taneshin (JPN) 1918	Ebor (GB); 1905	Hackler	Petrarch
Dam Taneshin (JPN) 1918	Ebor (GB); 1905	Hackler	Hackness
Dam Taneshin (JPN) 1918	Ebor (GB); 1905	Lord Gough	Lady Gough
Dam Taneshin (JPN) 1918	Ebor (GB); 1905	Lord Gough	Clar Case
Dam Taneshin (JPN) 1918	Daini Mira (JPN); 1911	Daini Spooner	Spooner
Dam Taneshin (JPN) 1918	Daini Mira (JPN); 1911	Daini Spooner	Daini Wall Dancebury
Dam Taneshin (JPN) 1918	Daini Mira (JPN); 1911	Mira	Unknown
Dam Taneshin (JPN) 1918	Daini Mira (JPN); 1911	Mira	Unknown

- Wakataka is inbred 5 × 5 to Hampton and 5 × 5 to St. Simon (both sire side).
- His sire Tournesol was a son of the English Triple Crown winner Gainsborough.
- His half-brother Happy Chapel (by an unknown sire) won the Teishitsu Goshoten (Tokyo).

== See also ==
- Thoroughbred racing in Japan
- Tokyo Yushun
- Gainsborough (horse)
