= Imposing =

Australian Thoroughbred racehorse

- Sire: Todman
- Grandsire: Star Kingdom
- Dam: Hialeah
- Damsire: Arctic Explorer
- Sex: Stallion
- Foaled: 1975
- Country: Australia
- Colour: Chestnut
- Breeder: Freyer
- Trainer: TJ Smith

Major wins
- Stradbroke Handicap (1979); George Main Stakes (1979); Epsom Handicap (1979)

Imposing was a notable Australian thoroughbred racehorse.

He was a chestnut son of Todman from the Arctic Explorer mare Hialeah.

Some of his major race victories included the 1979 AJC Epsom Handicap, AJC George Main Stakes and the STC Hill Stakes.

== Stud career ==
Imposing produced six individual Group 1 winners during his stud career:

=== Notable progeny ===
'c = colt, f = filly, g = gelding

Foaled	Name	Sex	Major wins
1981	Importune	c	Rothwells Stakes, Australian Derby (WA)
1981	Solveig	f	Avondale Cup, New Zealand Oaks, WRC DB Handicap, Captain Cook Stakes
1983	Imprimatur	c	Spring Champion Stakes
1984	Imposera	f	Australasian Oaks, Caulfield Cup
1984	Super Impose	g	Doncaster Handicap (twice), Epsom Handicap (twice), Chipping Norton Stakes (twice), Ranvet Stakes, W. S. Cox Plate
1989	Credit Account	f	Beat Diabetes 2 Stakes
