= Baramul Stud =

Racehorse stud farm in Australia

Coordinates: 32.5550°S 150.3640°E

- Country: Australia
- State: New South Wales
- Address: Widden Valley Road, Widden Valley. 2328
- Owner: Gerry Harvey
- Website: Baramul Stud

Baramul Stud is a racehorse stud farm in Australia. It was founded in 1940 by Sydney solicitor Alf Ellison, or A.O. as he was often known. The name of Baramul originally had two Rs. It was developed on land known as Joe's Paddock, that had previously produced some good early horses. Ellison earlier had his mares at the Widden Stud nearby. Its founder had an interest in horticulture, as well as racing and breeding, and he produced prize-winning camellias. Whilst visiting the Widden Valley, Ellison had discovered that the area was not only physically attractive but that it was good for the growing of pastures as well.

After purchasing the land, the Department of Agriculture tested the soil and it was found to have just the right ratio of calcium to phosphorus for grazing cattle as well as horses, and cattle. Soon after its foundation Ellison bred Alister at Baramul. Alister went on to win the AJC and VRC Derbys and the Cox Plate. From 1951, Star Kingdom, a sire owned by a partnership of Ellison, Stanley Wootton and Reg Moses brought great acclaim to Baramul. In 1984, the stud was purchased by Sir Tristan Antico and is now owned by Gerry Harvey.
