= Star Kingdom =

Irish-bred Thoroughbred racehorse

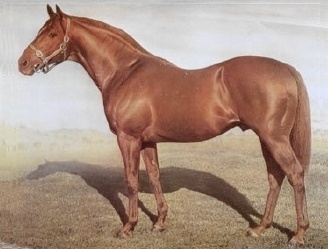
- Sire: Stardust
- Grandsire: Hyperion
- Dam: Impromptu
- Damsire: Concerto
- Sex: Stallion
- Foaled: 30 April 1946
- Died: 21 April 1967 (aged 20)
- Country: Ireland
- Colour: Chestnut
- Breeder: Richard Ball
- Owner: Wilfred Harvey; Claude Leigh; Alf Ellison, Reg Moses and Stanley Wootton (at stud)
- Trainer: 1. John C. Waugh; 2. Fred Templemen
- Record: 16: 9–2–1
- Earnings: £12,352

Major wins
- Richmond Stakes (1948); Gimcrack Stakes (1948); Greenham Stakes (1949); Jersey Stakes (1949); Hungerford Stakes (1949)

Awards
- Leading sire in Australia (1959, 1960, 1961, 1962, 1965)

Honours
- Star Kingdom Stakes; Australian Racing Hall of Fame
- Last updated on 12 October 2010

Star Kingdom (formerly known as Star King) (1946–1967) was a Thoroughbred race horse bred in Ireland in 1946. Exported to Australia, he was an outstanding sire, being the leading sire for five seasons, the leading sire of two-year-olds seven times as well as heading the broodmare sires' list three times.

Foaled on 30 April 1946, Star Kingdom was bred by Richard Ball, master of Cloghran Stud, in County Dublin, Ireland. Star Kingdom was a son of Stardust and out of the unraced mare, Impromptu by Concerto. He was inbred to Sunstar (who won the 2,000 Guineas Stakes and The Derby), in the fourth generation (4m x 4f). Wilfred Harvey purchased him at the Doncaster sales for 3,100 guineas.

== Racing record ==
Star Kingdom was registered and raced under the name of Star King in England. Conditioned for racing by John Waugh, in his two-year-old racing season he was rated second (to Abernant) among English sprinters. He was beaten by Abernant by the shortest of short heads in the National Breeders' Produce Stakes at Sandown Park and his jockey 'Sam Wragg thought he had won.' Out of 16 starts he recorded nine wins and was unplaced only four times collecting £12,352 in stakes. His wins included the York Gimcrack Stakes and the Sandown Park Produce Stakes. All of his wins, with the exception of one, were by long margins of up to ten lengths. He was rated 131 by Timeform in their first ever Annual of 1948

In 1949 Star King won the Greenham Stakes over 7 furlongs and the then 7.7 furlong Jersey Stakes at Ascot but ran disappointingly in the 2,000 Guineas and July Cup of 1949. Timeform's assessment of him was that he possessed a fine turn of speed and was at his best when opponents did not take him off his feet too early in the race. They rated him 128 in 1949.

== Stud record ==
Star Kingdom was purchased by Alf Ellison, Reg Moses and Stanley Wootton at a cost of £4,000 and sent to Australia in 1951. Upon arrival it was obvious that he had not travelled well, and he stood only 15 hands and 1/2 inch high, leaving his purchasers with serious doubts about the wisdom of their choice. As there was already a Star King in Australia, he was re-registered as Star Kingdom and installed at Baramul Stud in New South Wales. His influence was not immediately felt, but eventually he became Australia's leading sire for the first time in the 1958–59 season when his fifth crop began racing although he was the leading sire of two-year-olds in his first season and the first sire whose earners were to reach the equivalent of $2 million. Star Kingdom was the leading sire five times, leading sire of two-year-olds seven times as well as leading the broodmare sires' list thrice.

One of his achievements was to sire the winner of the first five Golden Slipper Stakes. Primarily a speed sire his influence is still seen in the bloodlines of Australian Thoroughbreds today. His progeny held Australian records for 4 furlongs, 5 furlongs, 5 1/2 furlongs, 8 furlongs and 10 furlongs at various times.

Among his offspring were 52 stakeswinners, including the outstanding horses Biscay, Citius, Concert Star, Todman, Fine and Dandy, Noholme, Reveille, Time And Tide, Sky High, Skyline, King Star, Kingster, Star Affair, Planet Kingdom, Kaoru Star (sire of Luskin Star, a Triple Crown winner), Mighty Kingdom, Gold Stakes, Magic Night, Starlit, Cymbal, Courteous, Sunset Hue (sire of Gunsynd) and Ritmar. The top racehorse Sky High was his most prolific winner, recording 29 wins.

Star Kingdom was also a noted broodmare sire, with the likes of his daughter Dark Jewel producing Baguette, a Golden Slipper Stakes winner who was unbeaten in his two-year-old season and future sire of note.

Standing at Barramul Stud for 16 successive seasons (1951–1966), he died from a bowel blockage, at the age of 21, on 21 April 1967. A headstone at Baramul Stud commemorates him and his son, Todman.

In 1978, more than 11 years after Star Kingdom's death, he had at least 42 sons standing at studs in Australia and New Zealand, including the very successful Kaoru Star. At the same time he also had over 100 grandsons standing at stud.

== Sire line tree ==
- Star Kingdom
  - Kingster
  - Star Realm
  - Gold Stakes
  - Todman
    - Cambaman
    - Eskimo Prince
    - Prince Of Baden
    - Joking
    - Crewman
    - Ricochet
    - Beaches
    - New Gleam
    - Blazing Saddles
      - Mr Brooks
    - Bootee
    - Imposing
      - Importune
      - Imprimatur
      - Super Impose
  - Mighty Kingdom
  - Skyline
    - Sky Sailor
  - Fine and Dandy
  - Noholme
    - Nodouble
      - Double Discount
      - Overskate
      - Semipalatinsk
    - Shecky Greene
      - Green Forest
        - Green Line Express
        - Somethingdifferent
        - Made Of Gold
        - Prime Glade
        - Forest Wind
        - Bonzer
        - Antequera
        - Royal Russian
        - Singh
    - Brigand
      - Cole Diesel
    - General Holme
    - Fools Holme
  - Royal Artist
  - Secret Kingdom
  - Sky High
    - Captain Kirk
    - Skyperion
    - Autobiography
    - Sky Cast's Double
    - Sky High's Son
    - Take Off
  - Columbia Star
  - Shifnal
    - Sun Monarch
  - Sunset Hue
    - Gunsynd
      - Bensynd
      - Tsunami
      - Midnight Gun
      - Domino
  - Time And Tide
  - Faringdon
    - Navajo Brave
    - Sabron
  - Star Of Heaven
    - Star Shower
      - Drawn
  - King Star
  - Star Affair
  - Biscay
    - Bletchingly
      - Kingston Town
      - Best Western
      - Lord Ballina
        - Bureaucracy
        - Carsons Cash
        - Lord Tridan
        - Count Chivas
        - Lord Ted
        - Cent Home
        - Askim
        - Bocelli
        - Balmuse
      - True Version
      - Star Watch
      - Canny Lad
        - Accomplice
        - Dodge
        - Allez Suez
        - He's No Pie Eater
      - Coronation Day
      - Kennys Best Pal
    - Zephyr Bay
      - Zephyr Zip
      - Elounda Bay
      - Broad Reach
      - Full And By
    - Marscay
      - Jetball
      - March Hare
  - Kaoru Star
    - Aurealis
    - Luskin Star
    - Pag Asa
      - Bonecrusher
    - Full On Aces
    - Old Spice
      - Rogan Josh
  - Rajah
  - Coalcliff
  - Osmunda
  - Planet Kingdom
    - Just Ideal
    - Ming Dynasty
    - Mighty Kingdom
    - Cosmic Planet
    - Ideal Planet
    - Our Planet
    - Leica Planet
  - Red God
    - Pacifica
  - Tattenham

== Pedigree ==
Pedigree of Star Kingdom (IRE), chestnut stallion, 1946
Sire Stardust (GB) Chestnut 1937	Hyperion; Chestnut 1930	Gainsborough	Bayardo
Sire Stardust (GB) Chestnut 1937	Hyperion; Chestnut 1930	Gainsborough	Rosedrop
Sire Stardust (GB) Chestnut 1937	Hyperion; Chestnut 1930	Selene	Chaucer
Sire Stardust (GB) Chestnut 1937	Hyperion; Chestnut 1930	Selene	Serenissima
Sire Stardust (GB) Chestnut 1937	Sister Stella; Chestnut 1923	Friar Marcus	Cicero
Sire Stardust (GB) Chestnut 1937	Sister Stella; Chestnut 1923	Friar Marcus	Prim Nun
Sire Stardust (GB) Chestnut 1937	Sister Stella; Chestnut 1923	Etoile	Sunstar*
Sire Stardust (GB) Chestnut 1937	Sister Stella; Chestnut 1923	Etoile	Princesse de Galles
Dam Impromptu (IRE) Bay 1939	Concerto (GB); Bay 1928	Orpheus	Orby
Dam Impromptu (IRE) Bay 1939	Concerto (GB); Bay 1928	Orpheus	Electra
Dam Impromptu (IRE) Bay 1939	Concerto (GB); Bay 1928	Constellation	Sunstar*
Dam Impromptu (IRE) Bay 1939	Concerto (GB); Bay 1928	Constellation	Stop Her
Dam Impromptu (IRE) Bay 1939	Thoughtless (IRE); Bay 1934	Papyrus	Tracery (USA)
Dam Impromptu (IRE) Bay 1939	Thoughtless (IRE); Bay 1934	Papyrus	Miss Matty (GB)
Dam Impromptu (IRE) Bay 1939	Thoughtless (IRE); Bay 1934	Virgin's Folly	Swynford (GB)
Dam Impromptu (IRE) Bay 1939	Thoughtless (IRE); Bay 1934	Virgin's Folly	Widow Bird (GB)(Family: 1-g)

* Star Kingdom is inbred 4S x 4D to the stallion Sunstar, meaning that he appears fourth generation on the sire side of his pedigree, and fourth generation on the dam side of his pedigree.
