= Double Discount =

American-bred Thoroughbred racehorse

Double Discount (foaled 1973 in California) was an American Thoroughbred racehorse who on October 9, 1977 set a new world record time of 1:57 2/5 for 1 1/4 miles on turf in winning the Carleton F. Burke Handicap at Santa Anita Park in Arcadia, California. A Bay gelding, Double Discount was sired by Nodouble and out of the mare, General Store.

Bred and raced by Ken Schiffer's Hat Ranch West, Double Discount was trained by Mel Stute. He retired from racing having won nine of his starts and with earnings of US$520,939.
