= Sky High (horse) =

Australian Thoroughbred racehorse

- Sire: Star Kingdom
- Grandsire: Stardust
- Dam: Flight's Daughter
- Damsire: Helios
- Sex: Stallion
- Foaled: 1957
- Country: Australia
- Colour: Bay or brown
- Breeder: Sir Brian Crowley
- Owner: Sir Brian Crowley
- Trainer: Jack Green
- Record: 55: 29-10-9
- Earnings: £77,055

Major wins
- Golden Slipper Stakes (1960); Champagne Stakes (1960); Victoria Derby (1960); Lightning Stakes (1961, 1962); Futurity Stakes (1961); All Aged Stakes (1961); Canterbury Stakes (1961, 1962); Warwick Stakes (1961, 1962); Epsom Handicap (1961); Caulfield Stakes (1961, 1962); MacKinnon Stakes (1961); Rawson Stakes (1961, 1962); Chipping Norton Stakes (1962); Hill Stakes (1962); Linlithgow Stakes (1962); AJC Autumn Stakes (1963)

Honours
- Australian Racing Hall of Fame

Sky High was an outstanding Australian Thoroughbred racehorse and sire. Some of his major race victories include the 1960 STC Golden Slipper Stakes, 1960 VRC Derby, 1961 and 1962 VRC Lightning Stakes and the 1961 AJC Epsom Handicap.

== Breeding ==
Foaled in 1957 he was son of the champion sire Star Kingdom (IRE) from Flight's Daughter by Helios (GB). He was bred and raced by former AJC chairman Sir Brian Crowley. Sky High was a younger brother of another notable performer Skyline (AJC Derby and Golden Slipper Stakes).

== Race record ==
A versatile horse he won races over distances ranging from 5 furlongs (1,000 metres) to 12 furlongs (2,400 m) and remains the only Golden Slipper winner to have contested the VRC Melbourne Cup (in 1961). He held the Flemington track record for 2,000 m until equalled by Let's Elope in 1992 and broken by Makybe Diva in 2005.

During his career Sky High raced against quality horses the calibre of Aquanita, Dhaulagiri, Fine And Dandy and his long-time rival Wenona Girl.

== Stud record ==
When retired to stud he was Australia's second highest stakes-winner behind Tulloch.

Following two seasons at stud in Australia where he sired four stakeswinners, he was sold to American interests and shipped to the famous Claiborne Farm in Kentucky where he enjoyed a successful career and sired Autobiography, US Handicap Horse of the Year in 1972 and 1973, Flying Fox ($167,653), Take Off and Sky Cast's Double.

== Honours ==
The Australian Turf Club honours Sky High with a Group 3 Thoroughbred quality handicap horse race, for three years old and older, over a distance of 1900 metres at Rosehill Gardens Racecourse in Sydney, Australia in March.
