= Skyline (horse) =

Australian-bred Thoroughbred racehorse

- Sire: Star Kingdom (IRE)
- Grandsire: Stardust
- Dam: Flight's Daughter
- Damsire: Helios (GB)
- Sex: Stallion
- Foaled: 1955
- Country: Australia
- Colour: Dark Bay or Brown
- Trainer: Jack Green
- Record: 28: 5-7-5

Major wins
- Golden Slipper Stakes (1958); Hill Stakes (1958); AJC Derby (1958)

Skyline was a notable Australian Thoroughbred racehorse who was the best three-year-old of his year. He was a bay or brown stallion foaled in 1955 by the champion sire Star Kingdom (IRE) from Flight's Daughter by Helios (GB) from Flight by Royal Step. He was the older brother of another notable performer, Sky High.

Following exceptional wins in the 1958 STC Golden Slipper Stakes, STC Hill Stakes and AJC Derby (in race record time of 2:28.8), his promising career was put on hold following a severe injury sustained in a stable accident.

Skyline eventually recovered from the injury but was never the same horse, failing to register another win.

He was retired to stud with the record of 5 wins from 32 starts, and from very limited opportunities and only a few foals, he sired, among others, Sky Sailor, winner of 11 races.
