= Australian Triple Crown of Thoroughbred Racing =

Australian horse race series

The Australian Triple Crown is a three-race competition for thoroughbred racehorses.

The Australian Triple Crown consists of the Randwick Guineas (1600 metres) (previously the Canterbury Guineas), the Rosehill Guineas (2000m), and the Australian Derby (2400m).

The first leg of the Australian Triple Crown is the Randwick Guineas. It is run at the Randwick Racecourse in Sydney. The race replaced the former Canterbury Guineas (1900 metres), which was discontinued after the 2005 racing season. That race, which originated in 1935, was run at the Canterbury Park Racecourse, also at Sydney, New South Wales.

The second leg of the Australian Triple Crown is the Rosehill Guineas. A horse race since 1910, it is run at the Rosehill Gardens Racecourse, located in Sydney.

The third and last leg of the Australian Triple Crown is the Australian Derby. This race, established in 1861, is run at the Randwick Racecourse, in Sydney.

All three Group One races are open to three-year-olds and all are located at Sydney, New South Wales, Australia.

== Australian Triple Crown winners ==
Key
Winner of all three races
Winner of two of the three races

Australian Triple Crown
Year	Randwick Guineas	Rosehill Guineas	Australian Derby
2026	Sheza Alibi^{♥}	Autumn Boy	Green Spaces
2025	Linebacker	Broadsiding	Aeliana^{♥}
2024	Celestial Legend	Riff Rocket	Riff Rocket
2023	Communist	Lindermann	Major Beel
2022	Converge	Anamoe	Hitotsu
2021	Lion's Roar	Mo'unga	Explosive Jack
2020	Shadow Hero	Castelvecchio	Quick Thinker
2019	The Autumn Sun	The Autumn Sun	Angel of Truth
2018	Kementari	D'Argento	Levendi
2017	Inference	Gingernuts	Jon Snow
2016	Le Romain	Tarzino	Tavago
2015	Hallowed Crown	Volkstok'n'barrell	Mongolian Khan
2014	Dissident	Criterion	Criterion
2013	It's a Dundeel	It's a Dundeel	It's a Dundeel
2012	Mosheen^{♥}	Laser Hawk	Ethiopia
2011	Ilovethiscity	Jimmy Choux	Shamrocker^{♥}
2010	Shoot Out	Zabrasive	Shoot Out
2009	Metal Bender	Metal Bender	Roman Emperor
2008	Weekend Hussler	Dealer Principal	Nom Du Jeu
2007	Mentality	He's No Pie Eater	Fiumicino
2006	Hotel Grand	De Beers	Headturner
2005	Jymcarew	Eremein	Eremein
2004	Niello	Niello	Starcraft
2003	Fine Society^{♥}	Helenus	Clangalang
2002	Carnegie Express	Carnegie Express	Don Eduardo
2001	Universal Prince	Sale of Century	Universal Prince
2000	Fairway	Diatribe	Fairway
1999	Arena	Sky Heights	Sky Heights
1998	Tycoon Lil^{♥}	Tie the Knot	Gold Guru
1997	Intergaze	Tarnpir Lane	Ebony Grosve
1996	Octagonal	Octagonal	Octagonal
1995	Sharscay	Danewin	Ivory's Irish
1994	Western Red	Star of Maple	Mahogany
1993	Kingston Bay	Innocent King	Innocent King
1992	Veandercross	Naturalism	Naturalism
1991	St. Jude	Surfers Paradise	Durbridge
1990	Interstellar	Solar Circle	Dr. Grace
1989	Riverina Charm^{♥}	Riverina Charm^{♥}	Research^{♥}
1988	High Regard	Sky Chase	Beau Zam
1987	Tidal Light^{♥}	Ring Joe	Myocard
1986	Dolcezza^{♥}	Drawn	Bonecrusher
1985	Spirit of Kingston^{♥}	Spirit of Kingston^{♥}	Tristarc^{♥}
1984	Beechcraft	Alibhai	Prolific
1983	Mr McGinty	Strawberry Road	Strawberry Road
1982	Rare Form	Isle of Man	Rose of Kingston^{♥}
1981	Ring the Bell	Deck the Halls^{♥}	Our Paddy Boy
1980	Rocky Top	Kingston Town	Kingston Town
1979	Red Nose	Dulcify	Dulcify
1978	no race	no race	no race
1977	Belmura Lad	Lefroy	Belmura Lad
1976	Chasta Bellota	Fashion Beau	Great Lover
1975	Rosie Heir	Battle Sign	Battle Sign
1974	Sydney Cove	Taras Bulba	Taras Bulba
1973	Imagele	Imagele	Imagele
1972	Lord Ben	Longfella	Gold Brick
1971	Egyptian	Latin Knight	Classic Mission
1970	Royal Show	Royal Show	Silver Sharpe
1969	Bogan Hero	Portable	Divide and Rule
1968	Broker's Tip	Royal Account	Wilton Park
1967	Honeyland	Grey Spirit	Swift Peter
1966	Garcon	Dark Briar	El Gordo
1965	Fair Summer	Fair Summer	Prince Grant
1964	Strauss	Eskimo Prince	Royal Sovereign
1963	Summer Fiesta	Castanea	Summer Fiesta
1962	Summer Prince	Bogan Road	Summer Prince
1961	Kilshery	King Brian	Summer Fair
1960	Persian Lyric	Wenona Girl^{♥}	Persian Lyric
1959	Martello Towers	Martello Towers	Martello Towers
1958	Prince Kerdieil	Bold Pilot	Skyline
1957	Todman	Tulloch	Tulloch
1956	Movie Boy	Gay Lover	Monte Carlo
1955	Aboukir	Caranna	Caranna
1954	Pride of Egypt	Pride of Egypt	Prince Delville
1953	Prince Morvi	Silver Hawk	Prince Morvi
1952	Prince Dakhil	Idlewild	Deep River
1951	Forest Beau	Hydrogen	Channel Rise
1950	French Cavalier	Careless	Alister
1949	Delta	Thracian Lad	Playboy
1948	Riptide	Royal Andrew	Carbon Copy
1947	The Groom	Conductor	Valiant Crown
1946	Decorate	Prince Standard	Concerto
1945	Monmouth	Questing^{♥}	Magnificent
1944	Accession	Tea Rose^{♥}	Tea Rose^{♥}
1943	Moorland	Moorland	Moorland
1942	San Sebastian	Hall Stand	Main Topic
1941	Chatham's Choice	Laureate	Laureate
1940	Ensign	Tidal Wave	Pandect
1939	Bonny Loch	High Caste	Reading
1938	Respirator	Aeolus	Nuffield
1937	Bristol	Ajax	Avenger
1936	Billy Boy	Shakespeare	Talking
1935	Hadrian	Hadrian	Allunga (tie) Homer
1934		Silver King	Theo
1933		Blixten	Hall Mark
1932		Bronze Hawk	Peter Pan
1931		Lightning March	Ammon Ra
1930		Balloon King	Tregilla
1929		Phar Lap	Phar Lap
1928		Mollison	Prince Humphrey / Cragsman
1927		Winalot	Trivalve
1926		Cromwell	Rampion
1925		Amounis	Manfred
1924		Nigger Minstrel	Heroic
1923		All Sunshine	Ballymena
1922		Caserta	Rivoli
1921		Furious^{♥}	Cupidon
1920		Wirriway	Salitros
1919		Elfacre	Artilleryman (tie) Richmond Main
1918		Woorawa	Gloaming
1917		Biplane	Biplane
1916		Wolaroi	Kilboy
1915		Wallace Isinglass	Cetigne
1914		Carlita^{♥}	Mountain Knight
1913		Beau Soult	Beragoon
1912		Burri	Cider
1911		Woolerina	Cisco
1910		Electric Wire	Tanami
1909			Prince Foote
1908			Parsee
1907			Mountain King
1906			Poseidon
1905			Noctuiform
1904			Sylvanite
1903			Belah
1902			Abundance
1901			Hautvilliers
1900			Malster
1899			Cranberry
1898			Picture^{♥}
1897			Amberite
1896			Charge
1895			Bob Ray
1894			Bonnie Scotland
1893			Trenchant
1892			Camoola
1891			Stromboli
1890			Gibraltar
1889			Singapore
1888			Melos
1887			Abercorn
1886			Trident
1885			Nordenfeldt
1884			Bargo
1883			Le Grand
1882			Navigator
1881			Wheatear
1880			Grand Flaneur
1879			Nellie^{♥}
1878			His Lordship
1877			Woodlands
1876			Robinson Crusoe
1875			Richmond
1874			Kingsborough
1873			Benvolio
1872			Loup Garou
1871			Javelin
1870			Florence^{♥}
1869			Charon
1868			The Duke
1867			Fireworks
1866			The Barb
1865			Clove^{♥}
1864			Yattendon
1863			Ramornie
1862			Regno
1861			Kyogle
^{♥} denotes filly

1919 and 1935: dead-heat
1928: Prince Humphrey recorded as race winner, though his brother Cragsman had won the race
1978: no races, due to racing change from spring to autumn

== See also ==
- Triple Crown of Thoroughbred Racing
