= 2023 New Zealand Derby =

The 2023 New Zealand Derby was a Group I horse race which was run on Saturday 4 March 2023. It was the 148th running of the New Zealand Derby, and it was won by Sharp 'N' Smart.

== Details ==
The New Zealand Derby is traditionally staged at Ellerslie Racecourse in Auckland, but was relocated to Te Rapa Racecourse in Hamilton due to extensive track redevelopment work.

Sharp 'N' Smart became the first New Zealand Derby winner for New Zealand Racing Hall of Fame trainer Graeme Rogerson, who has won more races in New Zealand than any other trainer in the history of the sport.

Sharp 'N' Smart was bred by Gerry Harvey and is a son of Westbury Stud stallion Redwood.

Bought by Graeme Rogerson for $55,000 at the 2021 New Zealand Bloodstock National Yearling Sale at Karaka, Sharp 'N' Smart is raced by Rogerson in partnership with a syndicate that includes Harvey, Merv Butterworth, Craig Leishman and Todd Bawden.

Sharp 'N' Smart brought impressive credentials into the 2023 New Zealand Derby, for which he was rated a $1.40 favourite.

He had been a Listed winner in New Zealand as a two-year-old, and finished fourth in the Group One J. J. Atkins in Brisbane, while his spring campaign featured a win in Sydney's Spring Champion Stakes and a runner-up finish in the Victoria Derby. He warmed up for his New Zealand Derby assignment with a second placing in the Thorndon Mile and a victory against older horses at weight-for-age in the Herbie Dyke Stakes.

The Derby brought more of the same, with Sharp 'N' Smart launching a powerful move out of midfield coming towards the home turn. Ridden by Ryan Elliott, the gelding kicked clear in the home straight before holding out the late-finishing Andalus to score by a long neck.

== Race details ==
- Sponsor: Auckland Thoroughbred Racing
- Prize money: NZ$1,000,000
- Track: Good
- Number of runners: 18
- Winner's time: 2:29.47

== Full result ==
	Margin	Horse	Jockey	Trainer(s)	Odds
1		Sharp 'N' Smart	Ryan Elliott	Team Rogerson	$1.40
2	Long neck	Andalus	Kozzi Asano	Stephen Marsh	$102.30
3	¾	Full Of Sincerity	Wiremu Pinn	Andrew Forsman	$95.70
4	1	Mark Twain	Warren Kennedy	Roger James & Robert Wellwood	$15.10
5	Long neck	Waitak	Jason Laking	Lance O'Sullivan & Andrew Scott	$10.30
6	Head	Savoir Faire	Joe Doyle	Mark Walker	$60.00
7	½	Dynastic	Opie Bosson	Mark Walker	$10.90
8	Nose	Desert Lightning	Vinnie Colgan	Peter & Dawn Williams	$12.00
9	1	Texas	Jake Bayliss	Nicholas Bishara	$55.30
10	1½	Warsaw	Cameron Lammas	Chris Gibbs	$60.30
11	½	Devildom	Craig Grylls	Lance O'Sullivan & Andrew Scott	$50.60
12	Nose	Channel Surfer	Masa Hashizume	Graham Richardson & Rogan Norvall	$140.90
13	4	Jaffira	Andrew Adkins	Lance O'Sullivan & Andrew Scott	$87.80
14	1½	Opawa Jack	Sam Weatherley	Chrissy Bambry	$38.60
15	Nose	Rockburn	Jonathan Riddell	John Bary	$136.20
16	Nose	Dimaggio	Sam Spratt	Tony Pike	$89.60
17	1	Cruz Missile	Michael McNab	Stephen Marsh	$67.20
18	17	Savabourbon	Ashvin Goindasamy	Stephen Marsh	$147.60

== Winner's details ==
Further details of the winner, Sharp 'N' Smart:

- Foaled: 28 September 2019
- Sire: Redwood; Dam: Queen Margaret (Swiss Ace)
- Owner: Graeme Rogerson, Todd Bawden, Craig Leishman, NZ Thoroughbred Holdings Ltd, Meg & Merv Butterworth & Martin Waddy
- Trainer: Team Rogerson
- Breeder: Gerry Harvey
- Starts: 11
- Wins: 6
- Seconds: 4
- Thirds: 0
- Earnings: $3,027,166

=== The road to the Derby ===
Early-season appearances prior to running in the Derby.

- Sharp 'N' Smart – 1st Gloaming Stakes, 1st Spring Champion Stakes, 2nd Victoria Derby, 2nd Thorndon Mile, 1st Herbie Dyke Stakes
- Andalus - 9th Hawke's Bay Guineas, 7th Avondale Guineas
- Full Of Sincerity - 9th Waikato Guineas, 4th Avondale Guineas
- Waitak - 1st Trevor & Corallie Eagle Memorial, 2nd Auckland Guineas, 4th Waikato Guineas, 2nd Avondale Guineas
- Dynastic - 1st Colin Meads Trophy, 7th Hawke's Bay Guineas, 3rd Sarten Memorial, 7th New Zealand 2000 Guineas, 3rd Auckland Guineas, 7th Karaka Million 3YO Classic, 5th Waikato Guineas
- Desert Lightning - 5th Hawke's Bay Guineas, 4th Sarten Memorial, 2nd New Zealand 2000 Guineas, 5th Uncle Remus Stakes, 3rd Karaka Million 3YO Classic, 1st Avondale Guineas
- Texas - 5th Northland Breeders' Stakes, 8th Uncle Remus Stakes, 7th Auckland Guineas
- Warsaw - 3rd Avondale Guineas
- Devildom - 2nd Gingernuts Salver, 2nd Waikato Guineas, 6th Avondale Guineas
- Channel Surfer - 3rd Hawke's Bay Guineas, 2nd Trevor & Corallie Eagle Memorial, 7th Uncle Remus Stakes, 8th Karaka Million 3YO Classic, 8th Avondale Guineas
- Jaffira - 10th Avondale Guineas
- Dimaggio - 5th Gingernuts Salver, 5th Avondale Guineas
- Cruz Missile - 1st Gingernuts Salver, 11th Herbie Dyke Stakes

=== Subsequent Group 1 wins ===
Subsequent wins at Group 1 level by runners in the 2023 New Zealand Derby.

- Desert Lightning – winner of the 2023 Captain Cook Stakes
- Waitak - winner of the 2024 Railway Stakes

== See also ==
- Recent winners of major NZ 3 year old races
