= Sharp 'N' Smart =

New Zealand-bred Thoroughbred racehorse

- Sire: Redwood
- Grandsire: High Chaparral
- Dam: Queen Margaret
- Damsire: Swiss Ace
- Sex: Gelding
- Foaled: 28 September 2019
- Country: New Zealand
- Colour: Bay
- Breeder: Gerry Harvey
- Owner: Graeme Rogerson, Todd Bawden, Craig Leishman, NZ Thoroughbred Holdings Ltd, Merv & Meg Butterworth & Martin Waddy
- Trainer: Team Rogerson
- Record: 11:6-4-0
- Earnings: NZ$3,027,166

Major wins
- New Zealand Derby (2023); Herbie Dyke Stakes (2023); Spring Champion Stakes (2022)

Sharp 'N' Smart (foaled 28 September 2019) is a New Zealand racehorse which has won at Group One level in both New Zealand and Australia.

== Background ==
Sharp 'N' Smart was bred by Gerry Harvey and is a son of Westbury Stud stallion Redwood.

Bought by New Zealand Racing Hall of Fame inductee Graeme Rogerson for $55,000 at the 2021 New Zealand Bloodstock National Yearling Sale at Karaka, Sharp 'N' Smart is raced by Rogerson in partnership with a syndicate that includes Harvey, Merv & Meg Butterworth, Craig Leishman and Todd Bawden.

== Racing career ==
Sharp 'N' Smart made a promising start to his career as an autumn two-year-old, winning at Listed level in New Zealand before a Queensland campaign that produced a second in the Listed The Phoenix and a fourth in the Group One J. J. Atkins.

The gelding took a big step forward in the spring of his three-year-old season, scoring back-to-back Group wins in Sydney in the Gloaming Stakes and the Group One Spring Champion Stakes. He then lined up in the Group One Victoria Derby after only a seven-day turnaround, finishing second behind Manzoice.

Sharp 'N' Smart resumed in the summer with a second placing in the Thorndon Mile, then scored a rare victory by a three-year-old against older horses in the weight-for-age Herbie Dyke Stakes.

Sharp 'N' Smart was rated a $1.40 favourite for the 2023 New Zealand Derby, which was run at Te Rapa Racecourse. Confidently ridden by Ryan Elliot, Sharp 'N' Smart launched a powerful run approaching the home turn and was too strong down the straight, scoring by a long neck.

He was named New Zealand Horse of the Year in the 2023 season.

== See also ==
- 2023 New Zealand Derby
