= Katie Page =

Australian business executive

- Born: 1956 (age 69–70); Mareeba, Queensland
- Education: Brisbane State High School
- Known for: CEO of Harvey Norman; Co-owner, Magic Millions
- Board member of: National Rugby League
- Spouse: Gerry Harvey (m. 1988)
- Children: 2

Kay Leslie "Katie" Page (born 1956) is an Australian business executive and the CEO of retailer Harvey Norman. In 2015, she was ranked fourth on the list of the "50 most powerful women in business". She is a backer of several professional sports and an active promoter of women in sports.

== Early life and education ==
Page was born in Mareeba, Queensland, Australia. She has three sisters. Her father, a bank manager, relocated the family approximately every four years, and Katie and her sisters grew up in St George, Rockhampton, and Brisbane. She graduated from Brisbane State High School in 1973 and planned to become a surveyor, but was discouraged by the low pay available then for women. She moved to Sydney, posing as a 21-year-old. When she was 19, she competed in an "intelligence test" to raise funds for children with autism; Gerry Harvey was one of the judges. Six years later, Harvey offered her a position as an assistant at his new Harvey Norman store. Page worked in ad buying, sales, marketing, and publicity for the firm, and also helped Harvey syndicate his horses. In 1988, when Page was 32 and Harvey 49, they married. She is Harvey's second wife.

== Career ==
Harvey Norman was founded in 1982 by Harvey and his partner, Ian Norman. Page joined the first store in 1983 as an assistant and in 1999 became CEO of the company. Harvey is the executive chairman.

Under Page's stewardship, Harvey Norman expanded into New Zealand in 1996, Singapore in 2000, Malaysia, Slovenia in 2003, and Ireland. It entered online sales in 2001. As of 30 June 2015, Harvey Norman operated 277 stores in eight countries, with revenues of A$4.9 billion and net profit of A$165 million. Page's base salary was A$2.07 million in 2014.

In 2021 Katie Page-Harvey was inducted into the Queensland Business Leaders Hall of Fame.

== Other activities ==
Page is active as a backer of several professional sports. She co-owns, with Harvey, the Magic Millions Thoroughbred racehorse auction house, along with four breeding studs and 1,000 racehorses.

In 2004 Page was the first woman to be elected to the board of the National Rugby League (NRL). She introduced the NRL's Women in League in 2005. Harvey Norman sponsored the National Rugby League's State of Origin series from 1997 to 2012, and continues to sponsor the Women in League round and Indigenous All Stars match.

Page is an active supporter of women in sports. For the 2013 Jeep Magic Millions 2YO Classic, she announced a special A$500,000 prize to be divided among the first four horses passing the post that were owned or leased by women. The special purse, called the Racing Women's Incentive Bonus, was offered again in 2014 and 2015.

In March 2015 Page announced the company's sponsorship of the Auburn Giants, a mostly female, Muslim Australian Football League team. In September 2015 she announced the company's sponsorship of the all-female racecar driving team of Simona de Silvestro and Renee Gracie in the 2015 Supercheap Auto Bathurst 1000.

Page owned a share in the Byron at Byron Resort and Spa in New South Wales. In 2015 she was developing M3565 at Main Beach, Queensland, a luxury residential project with seven boutique apartments averaging A$17,000 per square metre.

== Personal life ==
Page and Harvey have two children. She is an avid badminton player.

In 2015, Page was ranked fourth on The Australian Business Review's list of the "50 most powerful women in business".

=== Net worth ===
Despite their 1988 marriage, from 2013 up to and including 2020, the BRW/Financial Review assessed Harvey's net worth as an individual and did not include Page. Since 2021, the Financial Review assessed the combined net worth of Harvey and Page jointly. The most recent review, completed in May 2025, assessed the joint wealth of Page and Harvey as A$3.82 billion, as published in the Financial Review 2025 Rich List.

Year	Financial Review Rich List		Forbes Australia's 50 Richest	
Year	Rank	Net worth (A$)	Rank	Net worth (US$)
2021^{[note 1]}	28 ▲	$3.20 billion ▲		
2022^{[note 1]}	32 ▼	$3.30 billion ▲		
2023^{[note 1]}	37 ▼	$2.91 billion ▼		
2024^{[note 2]}	38 ▼	$3.39 billion ▲		
2025^{[note 2]}	39 ▼	$3.82 billion ▲		

Legend
Icon	Description
Steady	Has not changed from the previous year
▲	Has increased from the previous year
▼	Has decreased from the previous year

== Notes ==
- ^[note 1]: Since 2021, the Australian Financial Review assessed the combined net worth of Page and Harvey jointly.
