= Harvey Norman =

Australian multinational retail franchise

- Type: Public
- Traded as: ASX: HVN
- Industry: Retail
- Founded: 1982; 44 years ago
- Founders: Gerry Harvey; Ian Norman
- Headquarters: Homebush West, Sydney, Australia
- Number of locations: 316 stores List: 195 (Australia, franchised); 121 (overseas (Note: Overseas locations currently (as of 2025) include Croatia, Ireland, Malaysia, New Zealand, Singapore, Slovenia, and the United Kingdom), company owned); (2024)
- Key people: Gerry Harvey (chairman and co-founder); Ian Norman (co-founder); Katie Page (managing director)
- Products: Computer, electrical, furniture and bedding goods
- Revenue: A$4.11 billion (2024)
- Operating income: A$541.68 million (2024)
- Net income: A$357.62 million (2024)
- Total assets: A$4.54 billion (2024)
- Total equity: A$4.53 billion (2024)
- Number of employees: 6,500 (2024)
- Website: harveynorman.com.au (AU) harveynorman.co.nz (NZ); Corporate website

Harvey Norman is an Australian multinational retailer of furniture, bedding, computers, home appliances and consumer electronics. It mainly operates as a franchise, with the brand and all company-operated stores owned by ASX-listed Harvey Norman Holdings Limited.

As of 2025, there are 316 company-owned and franchised stores across Oceania, Europe and Southeast Asia. Operating under the Harvey Norman, Domayne and Joyce Mayne brands in Australia, and as Harvey Norman overseas.

== History ==
Gerry Harvey and Ian Norman opened their first store in 1961, that specialised in electrical goods and appliances. Harvey and Norman had first met when both were working as door-to-door vacuum cleaner salesmen. The store's success prompted Harvey and Norman to expand the business and conduct talks with retailer Keith Lord, who sought to expand his own retail group. They could not settle on a name for the new business, with Harvey and Lord reluctant to take on the other's name. They eventually decided to retain Norman's name and that of its first store manager, Peter Ross. This spawned the retail chain Norman Ross.

Norman Ross became one of the largest appliance retail chains and by 1979 controlled 42 stores with sales of more than $240 million. In the early 1980s, Alan Bond and Grace Bros sought to acquire the chain, spawning a bidding war that saw Grace Bros incorporate the chain in 1982. Three weeks later however, a determined Alan Bond successfully convinced the Grace Bros director Michael Grace to sell the chain to Bond. Shortly after, Harvey and Norman were given notice and redundancy package of six months pay. Reasons for their sacking were not publicised, although Harvey later told The Daily Telegraph: "I said I wished Alan Bond would pack up his marbles and go back to Perth. Then I got a telegram telling me I was sacked".

Norman Ross went into liquidation in 1992. In October 1982, Harvey and Norman purchased a new shopping centre in the outer Sydney suburb of Auburn for A$3 million, and opened the first Harvey Norman store. The enterprise was intended to be a single store but its success led to the opening of others. Harvey Norman Holdings Limited was listed on the Australian Securities Exchange on 3 September 1987.

In the early 1990s, Harvey Norman adopted the superstore format then successful in the United States, and entered the computer and furniture markets. The first computer superstore was opened at Bennetts Green, Newcastle, in late 1993 with much fanfare. That was followed several weeks later by the opening of a larger superstore at Auburn. Many stores later expanded their computer sections.

The launch of Windows 95 was a huge success, with a few Sydney stores opening at midnight, and some regional areas opening at 6 a.m. Harvey Norman sold Apple Computer products for several years. Apple decided to stop supplying the chain in the late 1990s, but returned in 2004 with the iPod range, which later expanded into iPads, iPhones and iMacs.

A Norman Ross store was opened at Bennetts Green in 1995, with the purpose of being a clearance centre. That had mixed results, and was closed within 12 months. However, the Bennetts Green store expanded into larger premises in 1996, where it operates today. Part of the relocation was a dedicated educational centre, named Kidscape. Specialist employees from Dataflow provided advice to parents on which software was best for their child. Kidscape was installed at a number of stores, but it was discontinued at a number of them within two years.

Some stores also opened early for the Windows 98 launch, which included a number of offers, including an SPC CD with Harvard Graphics and Quicken. Other products, such as modems and printers, were promoted at $98.

Harvey Norman has relied on 'bricks & mortar' stores as its strength. When suppliers such as Compaq and IBM started supplying direct, Harvey Norman stopped selling those products in-store. After Compaq later stopped selling direct, Harvey Norman returned to selling Compaq PC products in 2001.

Harvey Norman's growth occurred organically until it acquired Joyce Mayne in 1998. A number of electrical stores in Western Australia, some of which were owned by Wesfarmers, along with the successful merger and acquisition of Loughran's in Tasmania. Further acquisitions followed and by 2000 the chain had 100 stores. In 2006, Retravision was struggling, and a number of Retravision stores were acquired by Harvey Norman. Many were later converted to either Harvey Norman or Joyce Mayne stores, but those that were not successful were closed down.

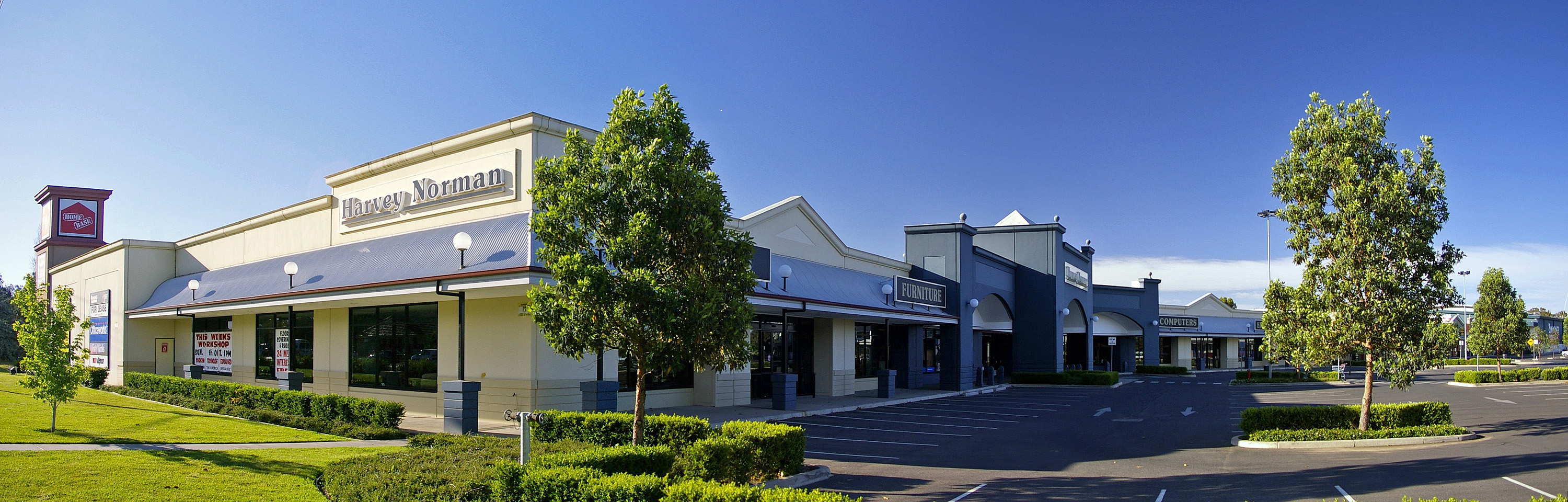
A Harvey Norman superstore in Wagga Wagga, New South Wales

== Company structure ==
Harvey Norman's operating structure is unusual in that each store department (flooring, bedding, furniture, computer and electrical) is operated by a separate entity of management. Thus, many superstores are a combination of three or four separate businesses managed independently contributing revenue to Harvey Norman Holdings Ltd. through lease payments and a portion of sales. Overseas, Harvey Norman stores are directly owned and operated by the ASX-listed, Sydney-based parent company, Harvey Norman Holdings Limited. However, sales commissions are still heavily used across all departments of the store to motivate salespeople, drive sales and improve service.

Retail marketing consultant Kevin Moore argues that this 'high reward-based remuneration structure' drives Harvey Norman's point of difference and is what contributes, at least partly, to its retail dominance. "Almost all the people in a Harvey Norman are there because they are great salespeople, can propose solutions for customers and are paid in line with what they sell... So when you walk into a Harvey Norman, the guys on the floor have a real reason to help you. You walk away happy at the end of the day having spent money with them. And so do the staff because some of the money you left in the store goes to them... for helping you solve a problem in your life."

=== Harvey Norman ===
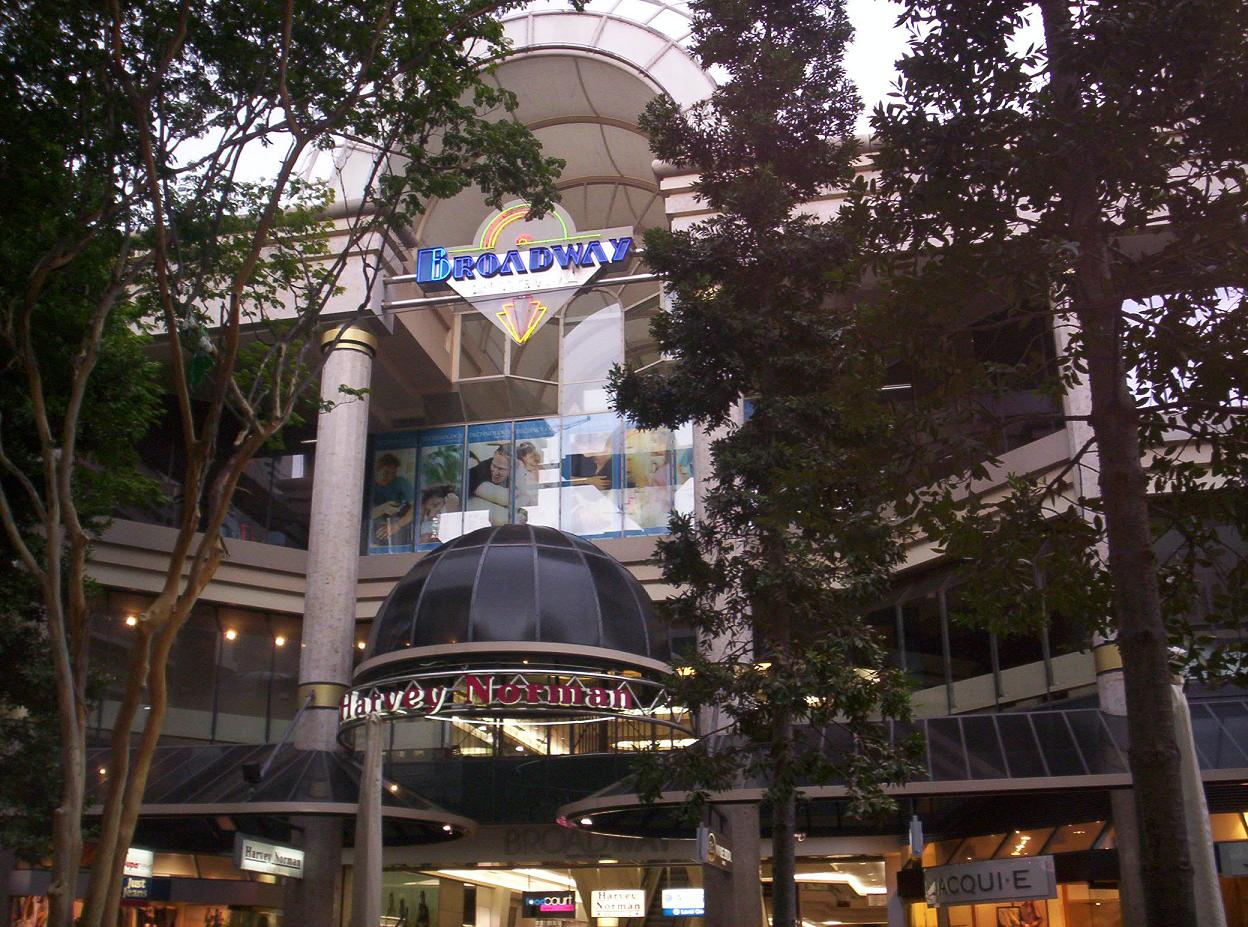
Harvey Norman in the Queen Street Mall, Brisbane

Harvey Norman is the flagship brand of Harvey Norman Holdings. Harvey Norman is mainly a household goods retailer – with items being sold in their stores including major appliances, small appliances, information technology (such as computers, printers and mobile phones), furniture, bedding, hardware (bathrooms) and flooring among other things. There are 193 franchise-operated Harvey Norman stores located throughout Australia, as at 23 April 2020, with separate franchisees owning and operating separate departments. In Australia, most Harvey Norman stores are located in New South Wales (56), followed by Victoria (45), Queensland (44), Western Australia (27), South Australia (10), Tasmania (7), Northern Territory (2) and the Australian Capital Territory (2).

=== Home renovations ===
Harvey Norman Design and Renovations is a subsidiary of Harvey Norman Holdings Limited. The design and renovations arm of the company specialises in bathroom, kitchen, wardrobe, home office, bars and home theatre renovations, and featured showroom franchises in Victoria, South Australia and New South Wales. The Victorian and South Australian outlets have since closed, leaving five New South Wales outlets in operation.

=== Domayne ===
Domayne is a furniture, bedding, flooring, computers, electrical and homewares chain independently operated by franchisees (and whose brand is owned by Harvey Norman Holdings). They focus on fashion and design in their furniture range, with their hallmark being their range of contemporary, Australian-made furniture. While their focus is on furniture and bedding, certain outlets (such as former Joyce Mayne stores) also stock higher-end cooking appliances. As of 9 June 2016, there are 17 Domayne franchised complexes Australia-wide, with 10 in New South Wales (Alexandria, Auburn, Belrose, Caringbah, Castle Hill, Liverpool, North Ryde, Penrith, Warrawong, West Gosford), 3 in Queensland (Bundall, Fortitude Valley, Maroochydore), 2 in Victoria (Melbourne QV, Springvale) and Western Australia (City West Perth, Osborne Park), and 1 each in the Australian Capital Territory (Fyshwick) and South Australia (Marion).

As of December 2019, some Domayne stores are listed as 'Harvey Norman @ Domayne'.

=== Joyce Mayne ===
Joyce Mayne is a retail chain offering similar products to Harvey Norman. They mainly offer whitegoods, small appliances, stationery and IT products (such as mobile phones, computers and printers). There are four Joyce Mayne stores in Australia as of 17 July 2025 – three in Queensland (Maroochydore, Chancellor Park and Townsville) and one in the Northern Territory (Darwin).

=== Former brands ===
==== OFIS ====
In August 2007, market analysts suggested Harvey Norman would launch a rival "big-box" stationery and office supplies competitor to Officeworks before June 2008. Harvey Norman has registered the brand name OFIS and as a result of the acquisition of former Megamart and Retravision stores, has access to well-placed potential sites on which to open Officeworks-sized outlets. In December 2007, Harvey Norman announced it would be opening its first two OFIS stores in Albury and Auburn in March 2008.They aimed to have 100 stores within ten years. In all, five OFIS outlets were established, but proved unprofitable and in February 2009 Harvey Norman stated it would close all of the stores by June 2009 and abandon the concept.

==== The School Locker ====
School Locker is aimed at primary and high school students, selling school uniforms, stationery as well as sports and musical equipment. There are two big box-style retail stores in New South Wales and four in Queensland in addition to a dozen School Campus stores.

==== Big Buys ====
There were five Big Buys stores in Australia (all now closed), located in Springvale, Victoria, Cambridge, Tasmania, Munno Para, South Australia, Auburn, New South Wales and Maroochydore, Queensland. They sold some of Harvey Norman's range, plus music instruments, camping gear, luggage, pet and baby products. Big Buys also had an online store via the Harvey Norman website.

== International ==
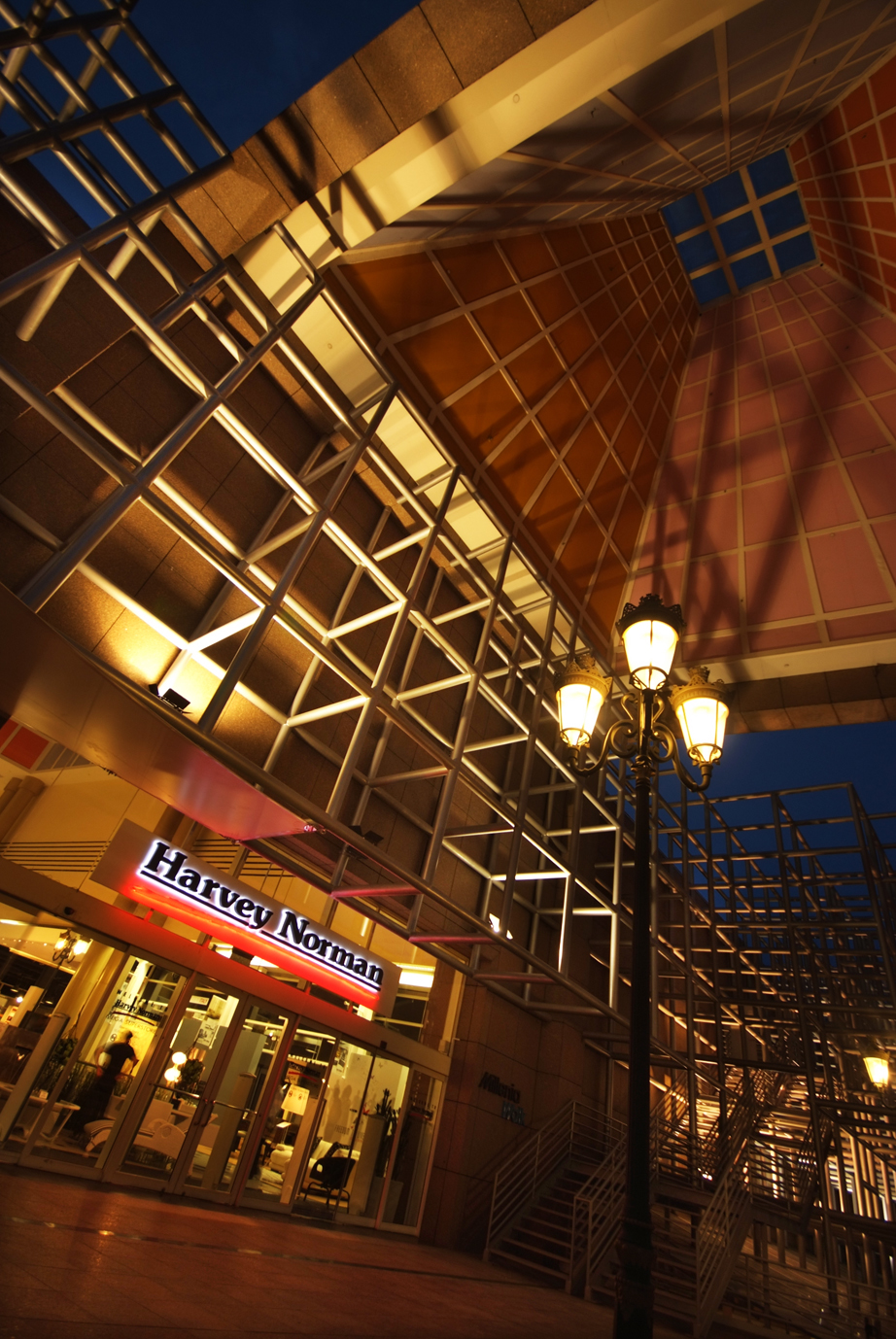
Harvey Norman store at Millenia Walk Singapore

As of August 2025, Harvey Norman operates 121 overseas stores across eight countries:

- Croatia (3 stores, since 2011)
- England (2 stores, since 2024)
- Slovenia (5 stores, since 2002)
- Ireland (16 stores, since 2003)
- Malaysia (38 stores, since 2003)
- New Zealand (44 stores, since 1997)
- Northern Ireland (2 stores, since 2009)
- Singapore (12 stores, since 2001)

George Goh Ching Wah, founder and chairman of publicly listed Singaporean sporting goods and fashion distributor Ossia International Limited, partnered with Gerry Harvey to form Harvey Norman Ossia (Asia) Pte Ltd as an S$33 million joint venture vehicle to bring the Harvey Norman brand to Asia in 1999. Harvey Norman Ossia (Asia) bought 50.6% of Pertama Holdings, a Singapore electronics retailer that was publicly listed on the Singapore Stock Exchange for SGD$36 million. Goh was appointed as the Deputy Chairman of Pertama Holding Limited. Harvey Norman Ossia (Asia) acquired 14 electronics stores in Singapore, formerly known as Electric City and owned by Pertama Holdings, and rebranded them as Harvey Norman stores. As of 2022, the company owns 14 outlets in Singapore. Its flagship store is at Millenia Walk, which was opened in 2015, and is the largest electronics store in the city area with 100, 000 sq ft.

Harvey Norman Holdings Ltd. and its associated companies effectively own 80.2% of Pertama, with Ossia International, holding 19.8%. Formerly listed on the Singapore Exchange (SGX), on 8 July 2013, it was finally delisted after the proportion of shares in free float fell below 10%. Under the former ownership structure, as of July 2013 Harvey Norman Singapore (a wholly owned subsidiary of ASX-listed Harvey Norman Holdings Ltd.) and Harvey Norman Ossia (Asia) Ltd.—a 60/40 joint-venture with Ossia International—had held over 83% of Pertama's shares.

=== Norman Ross ===
Harvey Norman Holdings Ltd previously operated Norman Ross stores in New Zealand. The first store opened on 4 December 2007 in Lower Hutt. All Norman Ross stores were rebranded as Harvey Norman in February 2013.

=== Online store ===
On 22 December 2011, Harvey Norman launched Harvey Norman Direct Import based in Ireland to ship games to buyers in Australia. The prices for video games are cheaper than the Australia-based online store of Harvey Norman.

== Controversies and criticism ==
- In 1995, the Australian Competition & Consumer Commission (ACCC) acted against Harvey Norman for knowingly distributing a catalogue which included more than 20 errors. These included illustrations of sale items with incorrect accessories or functions and packages describing features that they did not actually have.
- In 2000, before the Australian implementation of the Goods and Services Tax, the ACCC alleged that Harvey Norman advertised QuickBooks for $199 with bonus software valued at more than $900 while aware that the quantities of bonus software were insufficient to meet consumer demand. Harvey Norman was also alleged to have misled consumers regarding tax benefits associated with the purchase of Quickbooks and digital cameras.
- In November 2008, the company's chief executive, Gerry Harvey, was heavily criticised for comparing Ireland's economic problems with the Great Famine, an event which saw the deaths of over a million people. Harvey has since refused to apologise, admonishing the Irish for their poor sense of humour and stating: "It doesn't say much about a people when they can't take something like that on the chin and get on with it."
- On 8 October 2011, four environmentalist activists illegally climbed the Sydney Opera House and spread out a banner over one of the sails, reading "No Harvey Norman No! Stop selling Aussie forest destruction" as part of a protest against the retailer's profiting from environmental damage. A spokesperson for the protesters said in an interview the "profiting from the destruction of our spectacular forests is absolutely unacceptable". Harvey Norman had previously mentioned they were being "unfairly targeted" and were trying "their best" to sell products from sustainable timber. The protesters were arrested shortly after the event. In response, the Furniture Industry Association of Australia said that, "Get Up! are effectively campaigning for rainforest destruction in other countries instead of sustainably harvested Australian timber". The Minister for Manufacturing, Kim Carr has said, "the GetUp! 'No Harvey No' campaign runs the risk of deterring people from buying Australian-made furniture and supporting Australian jobs".
- In December 2011, Harvey Norman was fined AU$1.25 million by the Federal Court of Australia for misleading advertising relating to their promotion of 3D televisions to watch the NRL and AFL Grand Finals in areas which could not receive 3D signals.
- In 2011 the outspoken founder of Harvey Norman, Gerry Harvey, fronted a sustained media campaign and funded a special-interest lobby group, the Fair Imports Alliance. By late December apparently in a volte-face, Harvey Norman launched a gaming website that leveraged its Irish subsidiary to export video games direct to customers and therefore was outside of the jurisdiction of Australian tax laws for the purposes of GST. Concerns were raised earlier in the year about the prospect of retailers conducting business in such a manner.
- On 1 October 2015, the New Zealand online store offered cheap furniture deals between midnight and 8 am. Subsequently, the store decided not to honour the sales stating the prices were the result of a "genuine error", leaving a number of disgruntled customers and potentially a damaged brand name.
- In May 2021, a controversy arose over acceptance of JobKeeper funds earmarked for COVID-19 relief. Harvey Norman received $22 million in funds intended to keep its workers employed, but critics argued it did not comply with the terms of the program.

=== Relationship with Flexirent ===
Flexirent has had very close ties to Harvey Norman since 1995 and is heavily marketed in stores. Flexirent is alleged to have strong elements of predatory lending practices.

In addition, Gerry Harvey has himself asserted on primetime Australian television in a January 2008 airing of Today Tonight that Flexirent should be turned down by the average family. This is why Harvey Norman promotes the product to its commercial customer base.

== Motorsport ==
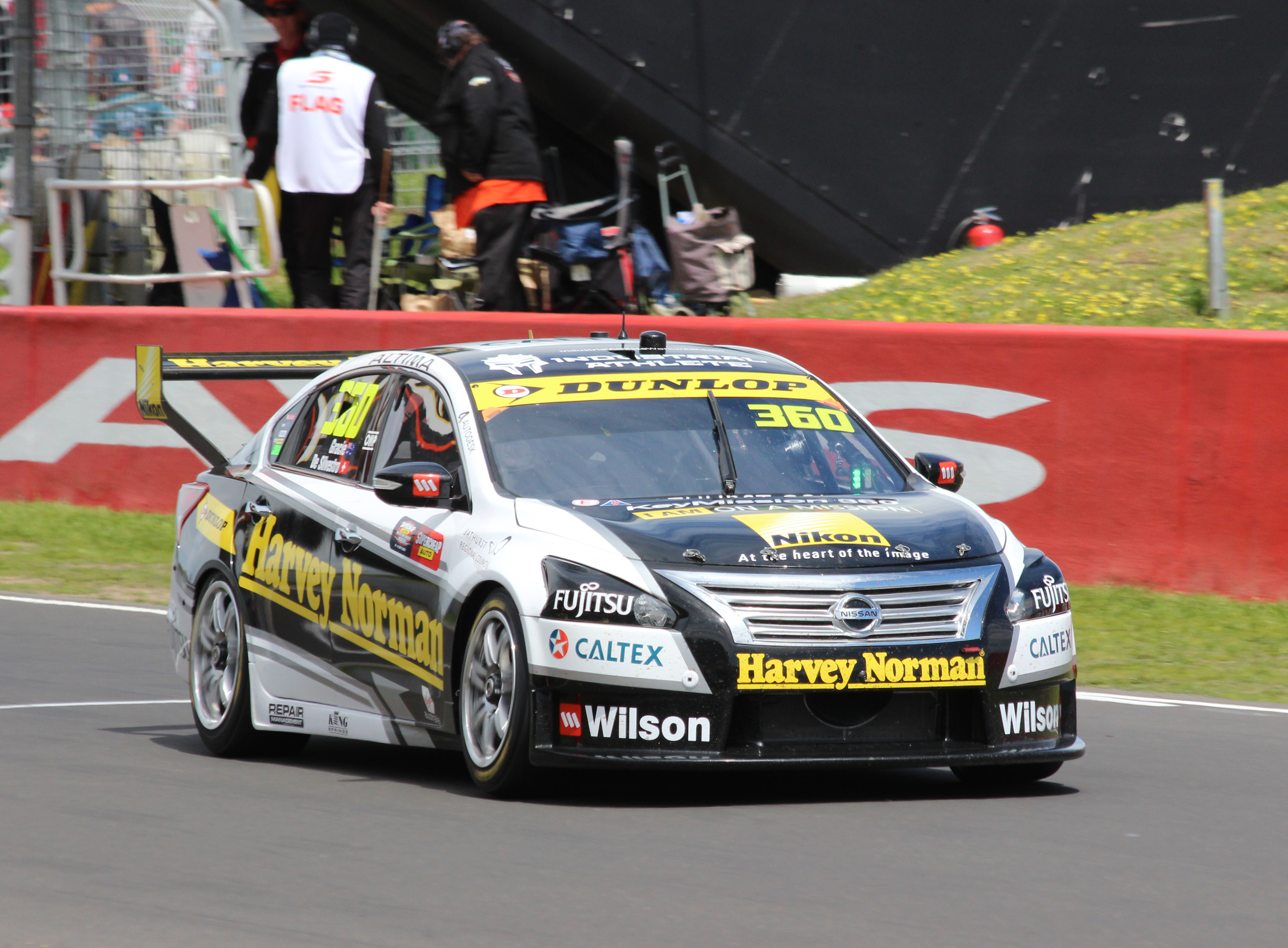
Harvey Norman backed wildcard at the 2016 Bathurst 1000

Harvey Norman partnered with Tickford Racing to support the #200 Ford Falcon FG X wildcard driven by Simona de Silvestro and Renee Gracie under the name Harvey Norman Supergirls for the 2015 Bathurst 1000.

In 2016 Harvey Norman once again sponsored the Harvey Norman Supergirls wildcard entry for the 2016 Bathurst 1000 now run by Nissan Motorsport using a Nissan Altima L33 and sporting the new number #360. In 2017 Harvey Norman became the major backer for Simona de Silvestro in the #78 Nissan Motorsport Nissan Altima L33. At the end of 2019 the partnership between Harvey Norman and Kelly Racing ended.
