= Sheza Alibi =

Australian racehorse (foaled 2022)

- Sire: Saxon Warrior
- Grandsire: Deep Impact
- Dam: Sheza Gypsy
- Damsire: Shaft
- Sex: Filly
- Foaled: 14 September 2022
- Country: Australia
- Colour: Bay
- Breeder: Fred and Desley Monsour
- Owner: Fred Noffke
- Trainer: Kris Hansen > Peter Moody, Katherine Coleman
- Record: 11: 8 - 2 - 1
- Earnings: US$3,909,945

Major wins
- The Vanity (2025); Sandown Guineas (2025); Angus Armanasco Stakes (2026); Randwick Guineas (2026); Doncaster Mile (2026); Makybe Diva Stakes (2026)
- Last updated on 31 May 2026

Sheza Alibi (foaled 14 September 2022) is an active Australian thoroughbred racehorse, winning the 2026 Randwick Guineas and 2026 Doncaster Mile.

== Background ==
Sheza Alibi was bred by Fred and Desley Monsour. Her Sire is Saxon Warrior and her Dam is Sheza Gypsy. She was bought by Fred Noffke for just $10.000. Sheza Alibi first trainer was Rockhampton-based Kris Hansen. Under Hansen's care, the filly competed in four races, securing two wins and two second places in regional Queensland before transferring to the stable of Peter Moody and Katherine Coleman.

== Racing Careers ==
=== 2025 : two-year-old season ===
Sheza Alibi start her career on 11 April at Rockhampton Racecourse. Trained by Kris Hansen she was ridden by Tasha Chambers and finished 2nd. Then on 22 April, she raced again at Rockhampton Racecourse ridden by Chris McIver and won the race. On 7 June, Sheza Alibi race in Lawrence & Hanson 2yo Classic at Townsville Racecourse, she once again ridden by Tasha Chambers and won the race.

On 28 June, Sheza Alibi raced her first Stakes race, ridden by Kerrin McEvoy. After the gate opened, she was positioned in 4th, on last turn she's start moving and start fighting for the lead, got passed by Autumn Boy on 300m mark and got stuck behind Autumn Boy on 200m mark, She then fighting with Kujenga and finished 2nd.

Her owner then changed her trainer from Kris Hansen to Peter Moody and Katherine Coleman. Peter Moody has trained couple Australian champion horse such as Black Caviar, Typhoon Tracy and Dissident.

=== 2025-2026 : three-year-old season ===
Sheza Alibi started her 3-year-old campaign under trainer Peter Moody on 18 October at Caulfield Racecourse in a Listed race, the Gothic Stakes, and was ridden by Zac Spain. After the gate opened, she was positioned in mid-pack; on the last straight she battled Ripley and Tentyris, but couldn't catch the leader. Tentyris, however, caught the leader Raging Force to finish 1st, while Sheza Alibi finished 3rd.

On 1 November, Sheza Alibi entered her first Group race in the Group 3 The Vanity at Flemington Racecourse, ridden by Luke Nolen. After the gate opened, she was positioned in mid-pack inside the rail. On the last straight, she was still in mid-pack surrounded by others. At the 200m mark, she got an opening between M'lady Rose & Amping Lass; she then took the lead at the 100m mark and won the race from Teine Aulelei, making it her first Group race win.

On 15 November, Sheza Alibi returned to Caulfield Racecourse to enter the Sandown Guineas, a Group 2 race. She was once again ridden by Luke Nolan. After the gate opened, she was positioned in 3rd near the rail behind the leader. At the 300m mark, she started her move from the inside, led from the 200m mark, lengthened her lead and won by 5 lengths.

On 21 February, Sheza Alibi entered the Angus Armanasco Stakes, a Group 2 race at Caulfield Racecourse. She was ridden by Zac Spain. After the gate opened, she was positioned in mid-pack inside the rail. At the 200m mark, Sheza Alibi moved to the front from the inside rail and took the lead. She held the lead and won the race by 2 lengths.

On 7 March, Sheza Alibi entered her first Group 1 race at Randwick Racecourse in the Randwick Guineas. She was ridden by Luke Nolen. After the gate opened, she was positioned mid-pack on the outside. She then made her move at the 200m mark from the outside, took the lead and finished 1st ahead of Autumn Boy, making it her first Group 1 win.

On 4 April, Sheza Alibi entered her second Group 1 race, the Doncaster Mile, at Randwick Racecourse. In that race, she was ridden by Jamie Melham. She then started from the 13th gate. After the gate opened, she was positioned at the back. She then started her move from the outside on the last turn. At the 200m mark, she caught the leader and led with 150m left. She then lengthened her lead and finished ahead of Autumn Boy by 4 lengths, making it her 2nd Group 1 win and 5th Group race win in a streak. This win made Sheza Alibi the first three-year-old filly to win the Doncaster Mile since Sunline in 1999. Sheza Alibi then took a break and was set for a return at the Golden Eagle race in spring.

== Race Statistics ==
Date	Distance	Race	Grade/ Group	Track	Field	Finish	Time (Note: Official time of winning horse. The time written in Italics doesn't belong to Sheza Alibi.)	Winning (Losing) Margin	Jockey	Winner (2nd place)	Ref
2025 – two-year-old season
11 Apr 2025	1100 meters	Maiden Handicap		Rockhampton	5	2nd	1:02.420	(2.73 lengths)	Tasha Chambers	Universal Harmony	
22 Apr 2025	1200 meters	Maiden Handicap		Rockhampton	8	1st	1:10.760	2.63 lengths	Chris McIver	(Bungarribee Rain)	
07 Jun 2025	1200 meters	2YO Open		Townsville	13	1st	1:09.590	1.39 lengths	Tasha Chambers	(Satisfied Mugs)	
28 Jun 2025	1400 meters	Tattersall's Stakes	Listed	Eagle Farm	12	2nd	1:22.660	(1.93 lengths)	Kerrin McEvoy	Autumn Boy	
2025-2026 – three-year-old season
18 Oct 2025	1200 meters	Gothic Stakes	Listed	Caulfield	7	3rd	1:09.350	(1.96 lengths)	Zac Spain	Tentyris	
01 Nov 2025	1400 meters	The Vanity	III	Flemington	12	1st	1:22.220	1.75 lengths	Luke Nolen	(Teine Aulelei)	
15 Nov 2025	1600 meters	Sandown Guineas	II	Caulfield	10	1st	1:38.830	5.75 lengths	Luke Nolen	(Tagline)	
21 Feb 2026	1400 meters	Angus Armanasco Stakes	II	Caulfield	9	1st	1:22.700	2.25 lengths	Zac Spain	(Salty Pearl)	
07 Mar 2026	1600 meters	Randwick Guineas	I	Randwick	9	1st	1:33.440	3.2 lengths	Luke Nolen	(Autumn Boy)	
04 Apr 2026	1600 meters	Doncaster Mile	I	Randwick	16	1st	1:35.620	4.29 lengths	Jamie Melham	(Autumn Boy)	
2026-2027 – four-year-old season
22 Aug 2026	1400 meters	Winx Stakes	I	Randwick	11	2nd	1:21.030	(1.39 lengths)	Luke Nolen	Autumn Glow	
12 Sep 2026	1600 meters	Makybe Diva Stakes	I	Flemington	11	1st	1:35.340	2.75 lengths	Luke Nolen	(Autumn Boy)	

== Pedigree ==
Pedigree of Sheza Alibi (AUS), bay filly 2020
Sire Saxon Warrior (JPN) 2015	Deep Impact (JPN); 2002	Sunday Silence (USA)	Halo
Sire Saxon Warrior (JPN) 2015	Deep Impact (JPN); 2002	Sunday Silence (USA)	Wishing Well
Sire Saxon Warrior (JPN) 2015	Deep Impact (JPN); 2002	Wind in Her Hair (IRE)	Alzao
Sire Saxon Warrior (JPN) 2015	Deep Impact (JPN); 2002	Wind in Her Hair (IRE)	Burghclere (GB)
Sire Saxon Warrior (JPN) 2015	Maybe (IRE); 2009	Galileo (IRE)	Sadler's Wells
Sire Saxon Warrior (JPN) 2015	Maybe (IRE); 2009	Galileo (IRE)	Urban Sea
Sire Saxon Warrior (JPN) 2015	Maybe (IRE); 2009	Sumora (IRE)	Danehill
Sire Saxon Warrior (JPN) 2015	Maybe (IRE); 2009	Sumora (IRE)	Rain Flower (GB)
Dam Sheza Gypsy (AUS) 2010	Shaft (AUS); 2004	Flying Spur (AUS)	Danehill
Dam Sheza Gypsy (AUS) 2010	Shaft (AUS); 2004	Flying Spur (AUS)	Rolls
Dam Sheza Gypsy (AUS) 2010	Shaft (AUS); 2004	Traceable (AUS)	Rahy
Dam Sheza Gypsy (AUS) 2010	Shaft (AUS); 2004	Traceable (AUS)	Tracy's Element (AUS)
Dam Sheza Gypsy (AUS) 2010	Gypsy Mai (AUS); 1997	Our Maizcay (AUS)	Maizcay (AUS)
Dam Sheza Gypsy (AUS) 2010	Gypsy Mai (AUS); 1997	Our Maizcay (AUS)	Maire Viita (AUS)
Dam Sheza Gypsy (AUS) 2010	Gypsy Mai (AUS); 1997	Gypsy Ahlee (AUS)	Alquoz
Dam Sheza Gypsy (AUS) 2010	Gypsy Mai (AUS); 1997	Gypsy Ahlee (AUS)	War Gypsy (AUS)

Inbreeding : Danehill 4S x 4D
