= FXL =

FXL may refer to:

- Flexirent, the ASX code FXL
- FXL, an Australian model of Isuzu Forward, a line of medium-duty commercial vehicles
