= Neville Sellwood =

Australian jockey

Personal information
- Born: 2 December 1922 Hamilton, Queensland, Australia
- Died: 7 November 1962 (aged 39) Maisons-Laffitte, France
- Occupation: Jockey

Horse racing career
- Sport: Horse racing

Honours
- Australian Racing Hall of Fame

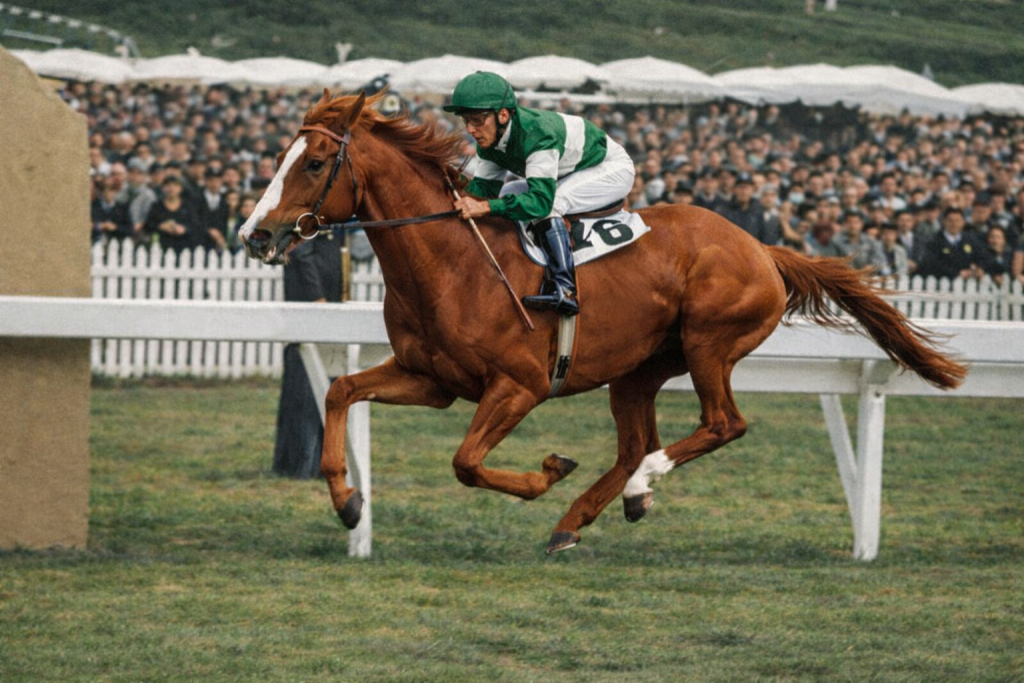
Neville Sellwood & Carbon Copy at Randwick

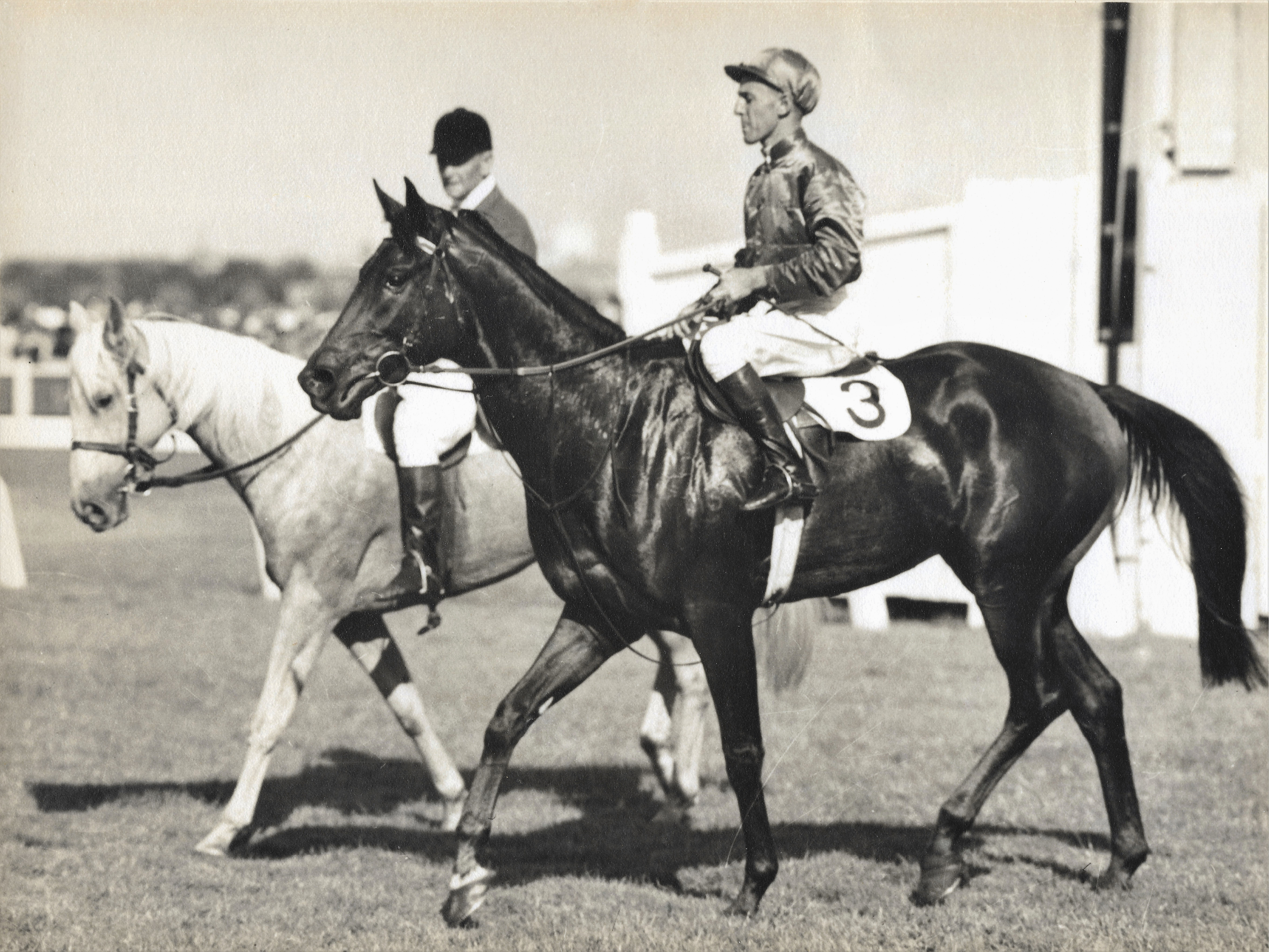
Neville Sellwood & Delta at Flemington

Neville Francis "Nifty" Sellwood (2 December 1922 − 7 November 1962) was a champion Australian jockey.

== Early life ==
Sellwood was born on 2 December 1922 in Hamilton, an inner-suburb of Brisbane, Queensland.

== Career ==
Sellwood was known for, among other victories, riding:

- Basha Felika - 1951 Caulfield Cup
- Delta - 1951 Melbourne Cup
- Grey Boots - 1950 Caulfield Cup
- Larkspur - 1962 Derby Stakes.
- Todman - 1957 Golden Slipper Stakes, Champagne Stakes (ATC), Hobartville Stakes, Canterbury Guineas, 1960 Lightning Stakes, Futurity Stakes (MRC)
- Toparoa - 1955 Melbourne Cup
- Tulloch - 1957 Caulfield Cup

The Neville Sellwood Stakes, hosted by the Australian Turf Club, was named in his honour.

== Death ==
Sellwood died on 7 November 1962, aged 39, after the horse he was riding slipped and fell on the track of the Maisons-Laffitte Racecourse in Maisons-Laffitte, France.

== Honours ==
In 2002, Sellwood was inducted into the Australian Racing Hall of Fame.
