= The Nivison =

- Class: Group 3
- Location: Rosehill Gardens Racecourse, Sydney, Australia
- Inaugurated: 1994 (as Tarien Quality Handicap)
- Race type: Thoroughbred - flat

Race information
- Distance: 1,200 metres
- Surface: Turf
- Track: Right-handed
- Qualification: Mares four years old and older
- Weight: Set weights with penalties
- Purse: A$250,000 (2026)

The Nivison is a City Tattersalls Club Group 3 Thoroughbred horse race at set weights with penalties, for mares, four-year-olds and upwards, over a distance of 1200 metres at Rosehill Gardens Racecourse, Sydney, Australia in October.

== History ==
The original name of the race Tarien Quality Handicap was named after the champion mare Tarien, who was a dual Warwick Stakes winner in 1953 and 1954 and also won the 1953 George Main Stakes and 1953 Craven Plate.

Prior to 2011 the race was scheduled in late September but race was moved to the City Tattersalls Club meeting to mid October in 2011.

=== Name ===
- 1994–1996 - Tarien Quality Handicap
- 1997 onwards - The Nivison

=== Grade ===
- 1997–2012 - Listed Race
- 2013 onwards - Group 3

=== Venue ===
- 1994–2000 - Randwick Racecourse
- 2001 - Warwick Farm Racecourse
- 2002–2003 - Randwick Racecourse
- 2004 - Warwick Farm Racecourse
- 2005 onwards - Randwick Racecourse

=== Distance ===
- 1994 onwards - 1200 metres

== Winners ==
The following are past winners of the race.

- 2026 - Gerringong
- 2025 - Gangsta Granny
- 2024 - Olentia
- 2023 - Magic Time
- 2022 - Sky Command
- 2021 - Minhaaj
- 2020 - Positive Peace
- 2019 - Madam Rouge
- 2018 - Resin
- 2017 - White Moss
- 2016 - Egyptian Symbol
- 2015 - Nayeli
- 2014 - Avoid Lightning
- 2013 - Diamond Earth
- 2012 - Quidnunc
- 2011 - Balmont
- 2010 - Marquardt
- 2009 - Madame Pedrille
- 2008 - Jewelled Gate
- 2007 - †race not held
- 2006 - Whoever
- 2005 - Our Sweet Moss
- 2004 - Besame Mucho
- 2003 - Lucida
- 2002 - Gwendolyn
- 2001 - Marlina
- 2000 - Spinning Hill
- 1999 - Daijobo
- 1998 - Razor Blade
- 1997 - Stoneyfell Road
- 1996 - Amber
- 1995 - Sweet Consort
- 1994 - Aunty Mary

† Not held because of outbreak of equine influenza

== See also ==
- Alan Brown Stakes
- Gloaming Stakes
- Hill Stakes
- Roman Consul Stakes
- List of Australian Group races
- Group races
