= Roman Consul Stakes =

- Class: Group 2
- Location: Randwick Racecourse, Sydney, Australia
- Inaugurated: 1978
- Race type: Thoroughbred – flat
- Sponsor: TAB (2026)

Race information
- Distance: 1,200 metres
- Surface: Turf
- Track: Right-handed
- Qualification: Three year old
- Weight: Set weights Colts and geldings 56½ kg Fillies 54½ kg
- Purse: A$300,000 (2026)
- Bonuses: Winner exemption from a ballot on the T J Smith Stakes

The Roman Consul Stakes is an Australian Turf Club Group 2 Thoroughbred horse race for three-year-olds, at set weights, over a distance of 1200 metres. It is held annually at Randwick Racecourse, Sydney in early October.

== History ==
The race is named after the late 1960s racehorse Roman Consul, who won the Chelmsford Stakes three times (1967–69). Prior to 2006 the race was run in early September.

=== Grade ===
- 1979–1983 – Listed race
- 1984–2004 – Group 3
- 2005 onwards – Group 2

=== Distance ===
- 1979–2000 – 1200 metres
- 2001 – 1100 metres
- 2002 onwards – 1200 metres

=== Venue ===
- 1979–1999 – Randwick Racecourse
- 2000 – Rosehill Racecourse
- 2001–2003 – Randwick Racecourse
- 2004 – Warwick Farm Racecourse
- 2005 onwards – Randwick Racecourse

== Winners ==
The following are past winners of the Roman Consul Stakes.

- 2026 - Satono Glow
- 2025 - Hidden Motive
- 2024 - Switzerland
- 2023 - King's Gambit
- 2022 - Best Of Bordeaux
- 2021 – Paulele
- 2020 – Wild Ruler
- 2019 – Cosmic Force
- 2018 – Sesar
- 2017 – Viridine
- 2016 – Russian Revolution
- 2015 – Exosphere
- 2014 – Brazen Beau
- 2013 – Zoustar
- 2012 – Jolie Bay
- 2011 – Foxwege
- 2010 – Buffering
- 2009 – Shellscrape
- 2008 – Montana Flyer
- 2007 – †race not held
- 2006 – Reigning to Win
- 2005 – Denmarket
- 2004 – Fastnet Rock
- 2003 – Exceed And Excel
- 2002 – Snowland
- 2001 – Stylish Lass
- 2000 – Kootoomootoo
- 1999 – Easy Rocking
- 1998 – Laurie's Lottery
- 1997 – Encounter
- 1996 – Anthems
- 1995 – Our Maizcay
- 1994 – Marwina
- 1993 – Jetball
- 1992 – Slight Chance
- 1991 – Prince of Praise
- 1990 – Bureaucracy
- 1989 – Show County
- 1988 – Wonder Dancer
- 1987 – Christmas Tree
- 1986 – Rendoo
- 1985 – Wat of the Moment
- 1984 – Red Anchor
- 1983 – March Magic
- 1982 – Andretti
- 1981 – Swift Gun
- 1980 – Hanalei
- 1979 – Meriville

† Not held because of outbreak of equine influenza

== See also ==
- Alan Brown Stakes
- Gloaming Stakes
- Hill Stakes
- The Nivison
- List of Australian Group races
- Group races
