= Flexirent =

FlexiGroup Limited
- Traded as: ASX: ASX FXL
- Industry: Finance
- Founded: 1988
- Headquarters: Sydney, Australia
- Key people: Symon Brewis-Weston - Chief Executive Officer
- Products: Retail Point of Sale Leasing, Vendor & Commercial Leasing, Telecommunications
- Revenue: ▲ A$ $223M (2011) - Volume
- Net income: ▲ A$ $52.9M (2011) - NPAT
- Number of employees: 500 (30 June 2011)
- Website: http://www.flexigroup.com.au

Flexirent Capital Pty Ltd. or more commonly Flexirent, is an Australian consumer leasing service of business and consumer electronics and is the primary product of FlexiGroup. (ASX: FXL)

The Flexirent service is offered by numerous computer and IT equipment retailers, however has been strongly associated with Australian retailer Harvey Norman since Flexirent's successful 12-month trial in its Brisbane stores in 1995. Flexirent and other similar lending products have been criticised for financial over-commitment and confusion about the leasing or rent-to-buy contracts signed by customers.

== History ==
Flexirent was launched in 1993 as a finance service for digital handset equipment. In 1995 the service was trialed at three Harvey Norman stores in Brisbane for a 12-month period and subsequently rolled out to all stores shortly thereafter.

The company was floated on the Australian Stock Exchange on 11 December 2006 after 11 years of operation.

== Product overview ==
Flexirent is typically a rental contract extending 12, 24 or 36 months consisting of monthly payments for products $300 or more in value. Rental terms can be arranged through Flexirent approved partners or direct with Flexirent through a pre-approval process.

At the end of the contract the customer is granted a number of options. Returning the equipment in good working order allows the customer to exit the contract or begin a new one (the latter is possible within the last three months of the contract providing it is equal or greater value). Alternatively at the end of contract the customer can negotiate to purchase the equipment outright.

== Media and Criticism ==
Flexirent and its business model have been subject to much criticism. Frequent subjects of criticism include perceived similarities to predatory lending practices, misleading pitching regarding the difference between 'renting' and 'buying' and salespeople highly motivated by large sales incentives to sell Flexirent services to customers.

=== Gerry Harvey and Harvey Norman ===
Flexirent first partnered with Harvey Norman in 1995 to offer rental finance to its business customers. In 1998, the service was offered to retail customers to finance technology and electrical appliances. When Flexirent was floated on the ASX in 2006, much of its business was tied to its interest-free offering with Harvey Norman. The product today is actively marketed in stores.

There are arguments for and against rental finance products provided by Flexirent. Criticisms include the total amount made on repayments often exceeding the cost of the product itself. Gerry Harvey had previously suggested in a January 2008 airing of Today Tonight that Flexirent should potentially be turned down by the average family.

=== Total cost of ownership ===
Many have criticised the total cost of ownership associated with 'Flexirenting'. A particular case highlighted in a media release entitled "Flexirent Deals Require A Long Hard Look" by the ACT Office of Regulatory Services featured a customer purchasing a laptop with extended warranty and IT support for A$2450. The customer was required to pay A$4,246.56 over 3 years, equating to an interest rate of approximately 40%. This is not an unusual case and can be verified by entering the applicable data into Flexirent's online quote calculator. Despite the large equivalent interest rates, the terms of a consumer lease dictate that the customer only has the right to use and does not own the equipment being leased. As per Flexirent end of term conditions, to own the equipment outright, a customer needs to negotiate a price (outlined in the contract) at the end of the contract with Flexirent, who have the right to accept or decline any offer.

=== Attempts to avoid consumer protection laws ===
The Micah Law Centre, a not-for-profit law firm, in a 2007 report postulated that financiers of consumer lease agreements, including Flexirent, sought to circumvent Australian consumer protection laws that apply to loan agreements, citing complex and misleading clauses relating to final ownership. It also raised issues with the high cost of the agreements and their marketing to low-income consumers.

== See also ==
- Harvey Norman
