= Angus Armanasco Stakes =

- Class: Group 2
- Location: Caulfield Racecourse
- Inaugurated: 1976
- Race type: Thoroughbred
- Sponsor: Sportsbet (2026)

Race information
- Distance: 1,400 metres
- Surface: Turf
- Qualification: Three year old fillies
- Weight: Set weights with penalties
- Purse: $300,000 (2026)

The Angus Armanasco Stakes is a Melbourne Racing Club Group 2 Thoroughbred horse race for three-year-old fillies, held under Set Weights conditions with penalties, over a distance of 1400 metres at Caulfield Racecourse in Melbourne, Australia in late February.

== History ==
The race is named in honour of the late Australian Racing Hall of Fame horse trainer, Angus Armanasco.

=== Name ===
- 1976–1990 - Tranquil Star Stakes
- 1991–1993 - The Dalgety Stakes
- 1994 - The Inglis Premier Sale Stakes
- 1995 - The Jewel Stakes
- 1996 onwards - Angas Armanasco Stakes

=== Distance ===
- 1976–1981 – 1400 metres
- 1982–1985 – 1600 metres
- 1986–1996 – 1400 metres
- 1997–2009 – 1600 metres
- 2010 onwards - 1400 metres

=== Grade ===
- 1976–1979 - Principal Race
- 1980–1999 - Group 3
- 2000 onwards - Group 2

=== Venue ===
In 1996 and 2023 the event was held at Sandown Racecourse.

== Winners ==
The following are winners of the race.

- 2026 - Sheza Alibi
- 2025 - Treasurethe Moment
- 2024 - Sassy Boom
- 2023 - Shuffle Dancer
- 2022 - Lavish Girl
- 2021 - Yes Baby Yes
- 2020 - La Tene
- 2019 - Qafila
- 2018 - Summer Sham
- 2017 - Savanna Amour
- 2016 - Catch A Fire
- 2015 - Sabatini
- 2014 - Spirits Dance
- 2013 - Meliora
- 2012 - Shopaholic
- 2011 - Pinker Pinker
- 2010 - Set For Fame
- 2009 - Gold Water
- 2008 - Zarita
- 2007 - Miss Finland
- 2006 - Serenade Rose
- 2005 - Ballet Society
- 2004 - Special Harmony
- 2003 - La Bella Dame
- 2002 - Elegant Fashion
- 2001 - Rose Archway
- 2000 - I Am A Ripper
- 1999 - Rose O' War
- 1998 - Champagne
- 1997 - Cheval Place
- 1996 - Not On Friday
- 1995 - Northwood Plume
- 1994 - †Party Time / Sovereign Appeal
- 1993 - Big Jamaica
- 1992 - Rockabye
- 1991 - Tessuti
- 1990 - Deira
- 1989 - Seapost
- 1988 - Golden Unicorn
- 1987 - Shackle
- 1986 - Golden Twig
- 1985 - Delightful Belle
- 1984 - Richebourg
- 1983 - Irish Heiress
- 1982 - Rogue's Delight
- 1981 - Tynia
- 1980 - Bravita
- 1979 - Sonstone
- 1978 - Pushy
- 1977 - Brett’s Honour
- 1976 - Better Draw

†Dead heat

== See also ==
- List of Australian Group races
- Group races
