= Spring Champion Stakes =

- Class: Group 1
- Location: Randwick Racecourse, Sydney, Australia
- Inaugurated: 1971
- Race type: Thoroughbred - flat
- Sponsor: Moët & Chandon (2013-26)

Race information
- Distance: 2,000 metres
- Surface: Turf
- Track: Right-handed
- Qualification: Three year olds
- Weight: Set weights colts and geldings – 56½ kg fillies 54½ kg
- Purse: A$2,000,000 (2026)

The Spring Champion Stakes is an Australian Turf Club Group 1 Thoroughbred horse race for three-year-olds at Set Weights over a distance of 2000 metres at Randwick Racecourse, Sydney, Australia in October.

== History ==
The race has been won by horses that later became champions. These include Kingston Town, Beau Zam and Tie the Knot. The Gloaming Stakes is considered a major preparatory race for this event.

=== Name ===
Originally when the race was inaugurated it was known as the Australasian Champion Stakes. The event was changed to its current name in 1978.

=== Grade ===
- 1971–1978 - Principal Race
- 1979 onwards - Group 1

=== Distance ===
- 1971 - 1 1/4 miles (~2000 metres)
- 1972–1982 – 2000 metres
- 1983 – 2100 metres
- 1984–2000 – 2000 metres
- 2001 – 1800 metres (run at Randwick's inner course known as the Kensington)
- 2002 onwards - 2000 metres

=== Venue ===
- 1971–1982 - Randwick Racecourse
- 1983 - Warwick Farm Racecourse
- 1984 onwards - Randwick Racecourse

== Winners ==
The following are past winners of the race.

- 2026 - Proxima Dea
- 2025 - Attica
- 2024 - El Castello
- 2023 - Tom Kitten
- 2022 - Sharp 'N' Smart
- 2021 - Profondo
- 2020 - Montefilia
- 2019 - Shadow Hero
- 2018 - Maid Of Heaven
- 2017 - Ace High
- 2016 - Yankee Rose
- 2015 - Vanbrugh
- 2014 - Hampton Court
- 2013 - Complacent
- 2012 - It's A Dundeel
- 2011 - Doctor Doom
- 2010 - Erewhon
- 2009 - Monaco Consul
- 2008 - Sousa
- 2007 - †race not held
- 2006 - Teranaba
- 2005 - Hotel Grand
- 2004 - Savabeel
- 2003 - Niello
- 2002 - Platinum Scissors
- 2001 - Viking Ruler
- 2000 - Universal Prince
- 1999 - Fairway
- 1998 - Dignity Dancer
- 1997 - Tie the Knot
- 1996 - Magic of Sydney
- 1995 - Nothin’ Leica Dane
- 1994 - Danewin
- 1993 - Fraternity
- 1992 - Coronation Day
- 1991 - Kinjite
- 1990 - St. Jude
- 1989 - Stylish Century
- 1988 - Sakana
- 1987 - Beau Zam
- 1986 - Imprimatur
- 1985 - Easter
- 1984 - Lucks A Lottery
- 1983 - Sir Dapper
- 1982 - Veloso
- 1981 - Best Western
- 1980 - Prince Majestic
- 1979 - Kingston Town
- 1978 - Lefroy
- 1977 - Sir Silver Lad
- 1976 - Cheyne Walk
- 1975 - Taras Bulba
- 1974 - Asgard
- 1973 - Gold Brick
- 1972 - Latin Knight
- 1971 - Gay Icarus

† Not held because of outbreak of equine influenza

== See also ==
- Craven Plate
- Stan Fox Stakes (The Callander-Presnell)
- List of Australian Group races
- Group races
