= Dundeel =

New Zealand-bred Thoroughbred racehorse

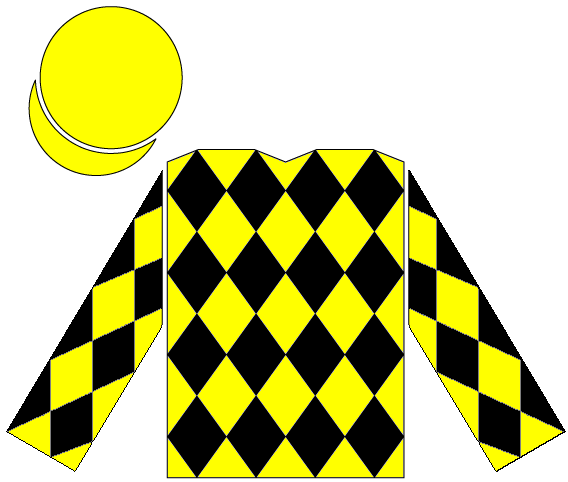
- Racing colours of Arrowfield Stud
- Sire: High Chaparral
- Dam: Stareel
- Sex: Stallion
- Foaled: 18/11/2009
- Country: New Zealand
- Colour: Bay
- Breeder: Murray & Jo Andersen
- Owner: Arrowfield It's A Dundeel Syndicate
- Trainer: Murray Baker & Andrew Forsman
- Jockey: James McDonald
- Record: 19: 10-4-1
- Earnings: AU$5,392,165

Major wins
- Gloaming Stakes (2012); Spring Champion Stakes (2012); Randwick Guineas (2013); Rosehill Guineas (2013); Australian Derby (2013); Underwood Stakes (2013); Queen Elizabeth Stakes (2014)

Awards
- New Zealand Champion Racehorse of the Year (2014); New Zealand Thoroughbred Racing's Champion Middle Distance Horse (2014); Australian Champion Middle Distance Racehorse (2014); NSW Champion Horse of the Year (2013); NSW Champion Three-Year-Old (2013); New Zealand Thoroughbred Racing's Champion Three-Year-Old (2013); New Zealand Racing Hall of Fame (2025)

Dundeel, or It’s A Dundeel as he was registered for racing in Australia, is a champion New Zealand Thoroughbred racehorse. He is the fifth and most recent winner of the Australian Triple Crown.

In 2025 Dundeel was inducted into the New Zealand Racing Hall of Fame

== Background ==
Dundeel is a bay colt trained by Murray Baker and Andrew Forsman at Murray's Cambridge stables. When in Australia Dundeel was managed by son Bjorn Baker at his Warwick Farm stables. The story of his life is provided on his website.

His sire High Chaparral won Epsom Derby in 2002 and the Breeders' Cup Turf in 2002 and 2003. As a stallion, he is best known as the sire of So You Think among 23 Group 1 winners.

== Racing career ==
Dundeel started his racing career with five straight wins culminating in the 2012 Spring Champion Stakes. He had previously added to his unbeaten record with another win in the Group 3 Gloaming Stakes (1800m) also at Randwick in Sydney.

In the autumn of 2013 he became the first horse to win the coveted Australian Triple Crown since Octagonal in 1996. He won the first leg in the 2013 Randwick Guineas (1600m). This victory was followed up by a comfortable 6.8 length win in the 2013 Rosehill Guineas (2000m). He completed the Australian Triple Crown in style with a 6 length win in the Australian Derby (2400m) and in doing so he also became the first ever to do so since the first leg moved from the Canterbury Guineas in 2006. He also becomes the first horse to win a clean sweep of the four major Group 1 three-year-old races run in Sydney, having previously won the 2012 Spring Champion Stakes (2000m), an Australian Thoroughbred horse race for three-year-olds at Set Weights, raced at the Randwick Racecourse, Sydney with prize money of A$400,000. His fantastic three-year-old season was recognised in receiving the 2013 NSW Champion Horse of the Year.

Dundeel continued to develop as a four-year-old and created history in becoming the first horse to beat the previously unbeaten Atlantic Jewel in the Group 1 2013 Underwood Stakes (1800m) at Caulfield in Melbourne and then proceeded to win the richest race to ever be run on a Sydney track in the $4M Queen Elizabeth Stakes. In reflecting on Dundeel's career, his trainer Murray Baker, and champion jockey James McDonald, who has partnered him in all but one start, both described Dundeel as the best horse they had ever trained and ridden respectively. Mick Kent, trainer of the Australian Derby runner-up Philippi, described Dundeel as “the best horse in Australia - as good as the mare (Black Caviar)”. Black Caviar's breeder Rick Jamieson has described Dundeel as a champion and "the best three-year-old we have seen for a while."

His victory in the 2014 Queen Elizabeth Stakes earned him a Timeform rating of 129 at the conclusion of his racing career, which ranks him as the 21st equal highest rated Australian racehorse since the 1950s.

== Stud career ==
On 21 April 2014, two days after his victory in the Queen Elizabeth Stakes, it was announced that It's a Dundeel was to be retired to stud. This was met with mixed reactions as his trainer Murray Baker was of the opinion that the best was yet to come from the champion colt and others were surprised that his stud fee was so modest given his achievements.

Dundeel stands at Arrowfield Stud, the largest Australian owned thoroughbred stud farm.

=== Notable stock ===
c = colt, f = filly, g = gelding

Foaled	Name	Sex	Dam	Dam Sire	Major Wins
2015	Atyaab	c	Sylvaner (NZ)	Danasinga (Aus)	Cape Derby
2015	Truly Great	g	Truly Special (Aus)	Jeune (GB)	Kingston Town Classic
2016	Castelvecchio	c	St Therese (Aus)	Dehere (USA)	Champagne Stakes, Rosehill Guineas
2016	Super Seth	c	Salutations (Aus)	Redoute's Choice	Caulfield Guineas
2016	Yourdeel	g	Miss Zapper (Aus)	Red Ransom (USA)	Sistema Stakes, Manawatu Sires Produce Stakes
2019	Dunkel	g	Kudamm (Aus)	Cape Cross (Ire)	South Australian Derby
2020	Celestial Legend	c	Sarraqa (Aus)	Snitzel (Aus)	Randwick Guineas, Doncaster Mile
2020	Militarize	c	Amerindia (GB)	Dubawi (Ire)	Sires' Produce Stakes, Champagne Stakes, Golden Rose Stakes
2021	Femminile	f	Femme Fireball (Aus)	Pierro (Aus)	South Australian Derby
2021	Idle Flyer	f	Progressive (Aus)	Street Cry (Ire)	Queen Of The Turf Stakes

== Pedigree ==
Pedigree of It's a Dundeel
Sire High Chaparral	Sadler's Wells	Northern Dancer	Nearctic
Sire High Chaparral	Sadler's Wells	Northern Dancer	Natalma
Sire High Chaparral	Sadler's Wells	Fairy Bridge	Bold Reason
Sire High Chaparral	Sadler's Wells	Fairy Bridge	Special
Sire High Chaparral	Kasora	Darshaan	Shirley Heights
Sire High Chaparral	Kasora	Darshaan	Delsy
Sire High Chaparral	Kasora	Kozana	Kris
Sire High Chaparral	Kasora	Kozana	Koblenza
Dam Stareel	Zabeel	Sir Tristram	Sir Ivor
Dam Stareel	Zabeel	Sir Tristram	Isolt
Dam Stareel	Zabeel	Lady Giselle	Nureyev
Dam Stareel	Zabeel	Lady Giselle	Valderna
Dam Stareel	Staring	Fiesta Star	Luskin Star
Dam Stareel	Staring	Fiesta Star	Very Merry
Dam Stareel	Staring	Sweet Violet	In the Purple
Dam Stareel	Staring	Sweet Violet	Sugar Doll

== See also ==
- Thoroughbred racing in New Zealand
- Thoroughbred racing in Australia
