= Ring the Bell =

New Zealand-bred Thoroughbred racehorse

Ring The Bell
- Sire: Rangong
- Grandsire: Right Royal
- Dam: Witchcraft
- Damsire: Mystery
- Sex: Colt
- Foaled: 1 September 1977
- Country: New Zealand
- Colour: Bay
- Breeder: J Edgar Jones
- Owner: E M Mackley & B P Wild
- Trainer: Neville Atkins
- Record: 19:8-5-2
- Earnings: $124,600

Major wins
- New Zealand Derby (1981); Canterbury Guineas (1981); Tulloch Stakes 1981
- Last updated on February 26, 2008

Ring The Bell (1 September 1977 – 19 October 1993) was a Thoroughbred racehorse who won the New Zealand Derby in 1981, the second Derby win in three years for trainer Neville Atkins. As a yearling, Ring the Bell had been sold for $3,000.

He was a good racehorse throughout his career, but there was one amazing patch of form in the middle of it for which he will be most remembered. He defeated older horses at weight-for-age conditions at Ellerslie Racecourse and then won the Avondale Guineas and the New Zealand Derby. In March 1981, Ring the Bell was sent to race in Australia where he became the first New Zealand-trained horse to win the Canterbury Guineas. After finishing second in the AJC Derby in April 1981 he returned to New Zealand ten days later for the Avondale Championship Stakes over 2000 metres. He carried top weight to a comfortable one length victory which, according to the Sydney Morning Herald proved him to be "a cut above" the rest of his generation in Australia and New Zealand.

He was ridden to victory in the Derby by Nigel Tiley, who later trained Look Who's Talking, an upset winner of the race in 1995.

Late in his career, Ring the Bell was campaigned in Britain. He finished a promising second to Kalaglow in the Earl of Sefton Stakes but his subsequent form was disappointing.

As a stallion, his progeny included the Grand National winner Lord Gyllene.

== See also ==
- Thoroughbred racing in New Zealand
