= Retravision =

Australian consumer electronics retailer

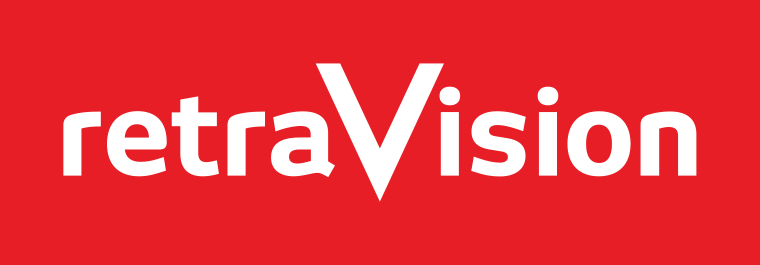
- Company type: Privately held company
- Industry: Retail
- Founded: 1961; 65 years ago in Osborne Park, Western Australia
- Headquarters: Bunbury, Western Australia
- Number of locations: 24 (2026)
- Area served: Australia
- Website: www.retravision.com.au

Retravision is a Western Australian-based consumer electronics retailer of computers, technology products, home entertainment products, laundry and kitchen appliances, air-conditioning products, small appliances and homewares. The retailer was founded in 1961 in Osborne Park, Western Australia. As of January 2026 there are 24 stores across Australia with 19 stores in Western Australia, 2 in Tasmania, one each in South Australia, New South Wales and Northern Territory.
