= Callaghan Park =

Venue in Queensland, Australia

- Location: The Common, Rockhampton, Queensland, Australia
- Coordinates: 23°22′43.698″S 150°31′19.835″E
- Owned by: Rockhampton Greyhound Club
- Date opened: 1898
- Screened on: Sky Racing
- Notable races: Rockhampton Cup (1600m); Capricornia Yearling Sales 2YO Classic (1200m)

Callaghan Park is a horse and greyhound racing venue in Rockhampton, Queensland, Australia. It is located in the suburb of The Common.

== History ==
=== Early history ===
In 1868, the Rockhampton Jockey Club was first formed. However, the first meeting at Callaghan Park didn't occur until the racecourse was relocated in June 1898. Horse racing previously took place at a racecourse in West Rockhampton near the present day site of the Rockhampton Airport.

=== William Callaghan ===
In March 1912, it was decided by the Rockhampton Jockey Club that the course be named Callaghan Park, in honour of the club's oldest member, Dr William Callaghan.

Callaghan had been a prominent member of the Rockhampton community since his arrival from Ireland in 1861. Shortly after his arrival, Callaghan was appointed as the District Coroner and Government Medical Officer as well as Rockhampton Hospital's House Surgeon. Callaghan was only the second doctor to practice in Rockhampton, taking over from the town's original doctor, Dr Archibald Robertson.

Callaghan's interest in horses stemmed from keeping thoroughbreds as a mode of transport enabling him to attend medical emergencies in a timely manner. Callaghan was credited with travelling long distances on horseback to treat and save the lives of patients in remote locations, such as a four-year-old snakebite victim at Cawarral in 1870, a boy who was seriously injured in a horse riding accident at Raspberry Creek in 1872, and a baby whom Callaghan delivered on a rooftop during a flood.

Although he became known for his involvement in local horse racing, Callaghan was an opponent of betting on horses as he believed gambling encouraged corruption.

During his time as a member of the Rockhampton Jockey Club, he served in the roles of committee member, vice-president and president. Callaghan also tried his hand at being a jockey, winning a six-horse race at a Rockhampton race meeting in 1868.

In 1869, Callaghan married Aimee Cowper, the daughter of Dean of Sydney, William Cowper. They briefly lived in a timber residence but eventually building a riverside residence at 170 Quay Street, now known as Trustee Chambers. Callaghan's residence, designed by architect John William Wilson and built by John Ferguson, was heritage-listed in 1992.

The decision to name the venue after Callaghan in 1912 was positively received in the local press. However, Callaghan died in April 1912, before the racecourse was officially named in June 1912. At the official ceremony, Rees Rutland Jones declared that Rockhampton's racecourse would be henceforth known as Callaghan Park.

=== Racing ===
While horse racing had been held since the racecourse opened in 1898, the first Rockhampton Cup at Callaghan wasn't held until June 1918 when it was won by a horse called "Rolad".

Races were postponed in 1919 when an influenza pandemic in Queensland which killed a number of people locally including the Rockhampton Jockey Club's secretary, Robert Reynoldson Dawbarn.

In 2007, quarantine measures were put in place following the 2007 Australian equine influenza outbreak. When the DPI allowed racing to return at Callaghan Park, only horses stabled at the venue or within the surrounding zone were allowed to race initially.

Racing at Callaghan Park attracted national media attention on two separate occasions when a horse race produced rare results. The same two horses finished in a dead heat on three separate occasions on the same day in 1922, while in 1938, a triple-dead heat occurred when three horses finished a race simultaneously in 1938.

Gordon Chalk officially opened night harness racing at Callaghan Park when it commenced in 1974 while night greyhound racing was officially opened by Russ Hinze when it began in 1982. Hinze also officially opened Callaghan Park's new grass race track which was used for the first time in 1984.

Callaghan Park has been the scene of a number of incidents over the years which has resulted in injuries and deaths of both jockeys and race horses.

The most serious incident in recent years occurred in October 2014 when 26-year-old jockey Carly-Mae Pye died from severe injuries she sustained when she was thrown from a horse at Callaghan Park during barrier trials.

Callaghan Park continues to hold regular horse and greyhound race meetings.

Major drawcards are the feature race meetings which include:

- St Patrick's Day Race Day
- 2YO Classic Race Day
- Rockhampton Grammar School Race Day
- Rockhampton Girls Grammar School Race Day
- Tattersall's Sprint Race Day
- Tattersall's Cup Race Day
- Rockhampton Newmarket Race Day
- Rockhampton Cup Race Day
- St Peter's Caulfield Cup Race Day
- Melbourne Cup Race Day

== Infrastructure ==
Callaghan Park has been developed over the years to incorporate the required infrastructure needed to host at least 45 race meetings a year. A photo finish tower was constructed in 1952. Administration offices at Callaghan Park were opened in 1972 in a block named the Boland Administration Building, named in honour of three long-serving committee members, Robert Boland, Russell Boland and Clive Boland. In 1979, the O'Duffy – Gordon Grandstand Complex was officially opened by Neville Hewitt. Extensions to existing offices were officially opened in 1994 by Bob Gibbs. The venue received a $4 million upgrade in 2010, with separate facilities built for the Rockhampton Greyhound Racing Club.

A new communications tower was completed at Callaghan Park in 2003, which currently hosts media and race officials.

== Media ==
The media's coverage of events at Callaghan Park extends back to 1936 when local radio station 4RO was granted permission to broadcast the description of races.

Races are now broadcast by Radio TAB and are televised by Sky Racing, with Callaghan Park-based race caller Russell Leonard also appearing in a weekly segment on WIN News Central Queensland on WIN Television.

Callaghan Park was used as a filming location in 2014 for the Australian feature film, Broke which starred Steve Bastoni, Brendan Cowell and Max Cullen.

== In the news ==
=== 1912 monoplane incident ===
In 1912, Callaghan Park hosted a race between a car and a Bleriot monoplane, piloted by American aviation pioneer Arthur Burr Stone which took place in front of a crowd of 7000 people. The plane made a forced landing at the nearby cricket ground, which caused damage to the aircraft.

=== 1983 Kerrisk case ===
Callaghan Park continues to play a role in an ongoing Rockhampton missing person case, being the last place bookmaker's penciller Bradley Richard Kerrisk, aged 30, was last seen before he went missing in June 1983. He was believed to have been carrying a large amount of money at the time he disappeared.

According to police, the reported sighting of Kerrisk was of him entering his Ford Telstar sedan at Callaghan Park. The car was later found parked outside a pub in Port Curtis, but Kerrisk was never seen again. A $250,000 reward remains on offer from the Queensland Police Service for information which leads to the apprehension and conviction of those responsible for Kerrisk's disappearance and suspected murder.

=== 1990 drugs raid ===
Police searched the jockey's room at Callaghan Park in February 1990 in what was believed to have been the first raid of its kind in Australia. Acting on information received, police searched twenty-four jockeys and their belongings for cannabis and other illegal substances. However, no drugs were found. The Rockhampton Jockeys Association said they weren't aware of any drug misuse at the race meeting and were happy to cooperate with police conducting the search.

=== Flood events ===
Owing to its low-lying location, flooding of the nearby Fitzroy River has inundated the racecourse and associated infrastructure at Callaghan Park numerous times since it opened in 1898. Eleven race meetings were cancelled due to the 2010-2011 Queensland floods.

== Community events ==
As the venue is available for hire, Callaghan Park is often used for other non-racing related community events including New Year's Eve celebrations and the CQ Mega Lifestyle Expo.
