= Ian Norman (businessman) =

Australian businessman and retail executive

- Born: Ian John Norman; 5 February 1939; Australia
- Died: 29 May 2014 (aged 75); Terrigal, New South Wales, Australia
- Occupations: Business executive, company co-founder

Ian John Norman (5 February 1939 – 29 May 2014) was an Australian businessman and retail executive.

== Career ==
Norman met his business partner Gerry Harvey when both were working as travelling door-to-door vacuum cleaner salesmen. In 1961, the duo partnered to open their first store in Sydney, which specialised in home appliances and electronics. Their store, which was called Norman Ross, expanded to forty-two stores by 1979, with annual sales of $240 million that year. Harvey and Norman sold the Norman Ross chain to Grace Bros who subsequently sold the company to Alan Bond in 1982.

The business partners then co-founded Harvey Norman, an Australian independently owned retail chain, that bears their name, in 1982. The new chain offered consumer electronics, furniture, and other household goods. The first Harvey Norman store opened in a shopping centre in Auburn, in 1982, the same year as the sale.

Forbes, had estimated in 2001, that he was 37th richest person in Australia.

By 2014, Norman, who remained an executive, held 175 million shares of Harvey Norman, a 16.5% stake worth an estimated $560 million. He, who had previously resided at Darling Point, died from throat cancer at his home at Terrigal on 29 May 2014, at the age of 75.
