= Randwick Guineas =

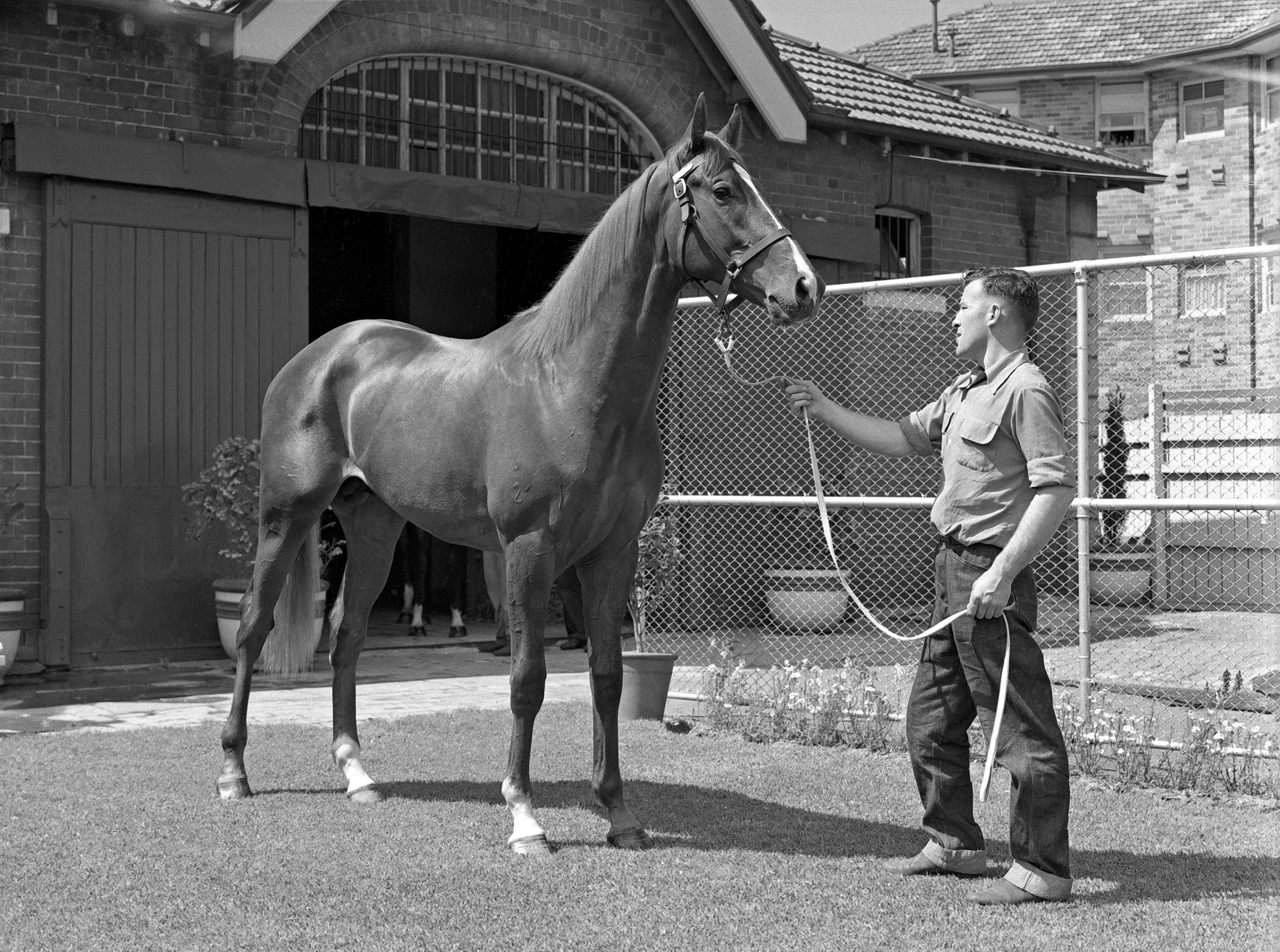
- Aboukir, 1955 winner
- Class: Group 1
- Location: Randwick Racecourse, Sydney, Australia
- Inaugurated: 1935 (as Canterbury Guineas); 2006 (as Randwick Guineas)
- Race type: Thoroughbred – Flat racing
- Sponsor: The Agency (2023 - 2026)

Race information
- Distance: 1,600 metres (5,200 ft)
- Surface: Turf
- Track: Right-handed
- Qualification: Three-year-olds
- Weight: Set weights colts and geldings - 56 1/2 kg fillies 54 1/2 kg
- Purse: A$1,000,000 (2026)
- Bonuses: Automatic qualification – Australian Derby and Doncaster Mile

The Randwick Guineas is an Australian Turf Club Group One Thoroughbred horse race for three-year-olds, run at set weights over a distance of 1600 metres at Randwick Racecourse in Sydney, Australia in March as a part of the Sydney Autumn Carnival.

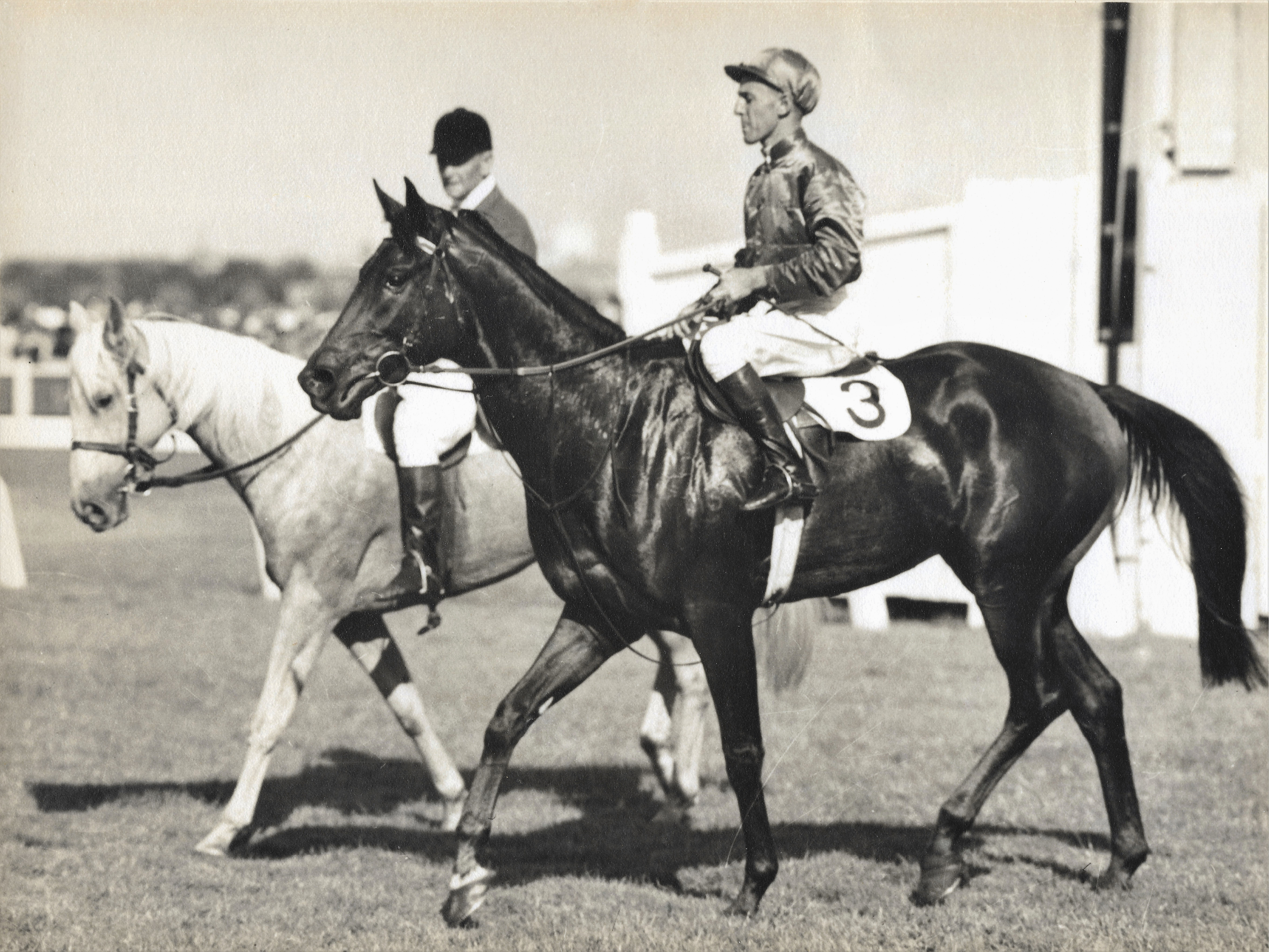
Delta,1949 winner

== History ==
The winner of this race automatically qualifies for a berth in the Australian Derby and Doncaster Mile

This race is the first leg of the Australian Three Year Old "Triple Crown" consisting of the Rosehill Guineas (2000 metres) and Australian Derby (2400 metres).

Recent multiple winners of the race include:

Trainers

- John Hawkes in 2003, 2004 and 2007, with Michael and Wayne Hawkes in 2017

Jockeys

- Darren Beadman in 2004 and 2007
- Danny Nikolic in 2009 and 2012
- Brenton Avdulla in 2011 and 2021
- Kerrin McEvoy in 2019 and 2025.

=== Name ===
This race replaced the former event Canterbury Guineas, which was discontinued after the 2005 running after the Australian Jockey Club and the Sydney Turf Club implemented major program changes streamlining the major races into the race calendar. As the Canterbury Guineas the race was originally run in the spring in early September but after 1978 the race was run early in the autumn as prep race for the rich Sydney carnival.

=== Distance ===
- 1935–1956 - 9 furlongs 80 yards (~1850 metres)
- 1957 - 1 mile 1 1/2 furlongs (~1950 metres)
- 1958–1972 - 9 furlongs 80 yards (~1850 metres)
- 1973–1975 – 1850 metres
- 1976–1996 – 1900 metres
- 1997–1999 – 1800 metres
- 2000–2005 – 1900 metres
- 2006 onwards - 1600 metres

=== Grade ===
- 1925–1979 - Principal race
- 1980 onwards - Group 1 race

=== Venue ===
- 1935–1996 - Canterbury Park Racecourse
- 1997–1999 - Rosehill Gardens Racecourse
- 2000–2005 - Canterbury Park Racecourse
- 2006–2010 - Randwick Racecourse
- 2011 - Warwick Farm Racecourse
- 2012 - Randwick Racecourse
- 2013 - Warwick Farm Racecourse
- 2014 onwards - Randwick Racecourse

== Winners ==
The following are past winners of the race.

=== Randwick Guineas (2006– ) ===
- 2026 - Sheza Alibi
- 2025 - Linebacker
- 2024 - Celestial Legend
- 2023 - Communist
- 2022 - Converge
- 2021 - Lion's Roar
- 2020 - Shadow Hero
- 2019 - The Autumn Sun
- 2018 - Kementari
- 2017 - Inference
- 2016 - Le Romain
- 2015 - Hallowed Crown
- 2014 - Dissident
- 2013 - It's A Dundeel
- 2012 - Mosheen
- 2011 - Ilovethiscity
- 2010 - Shoot Out
- 2009 - Metal Bender
- 2008 - Weekend Hussler
- 2007 - Mentality
- 2006 - Hotel Grand

=== Canterbury Guineas (1935–2005) ===
- 2005 - Jymcarew
- 2004 - Niello
- 2003 - Fine Society
- 2002 - Carnegie Express
- 2001 - Universal Prince
- 2000 - Fairway
- 1999 - Arena
- 1998 - Tycoon Lil
- 1997 - Intergaze
- 1996 - Octagonal
- 1995 - Sharscay
- 1994 - Western Red
- 1993 - Kingston Bay
- 1992 - Veandercross
- 1991 - St. Jude
- 1990 - Interstellar
- 1989 - Riverina Charm
- 1988 - High Regard
- 1987 - Tidal Light
- 1986 - Dolcezza
- 1985 - Spirit Of Kingston
- 1984 - Beechcraft
- 1983 - Mr. McGinty
- 1982 - Rare Form
- 1981 - Ring The Bell
- 1980 - Rocky Top
- 1979 - Red Nose
- 1978 - †race not held
- 1977 - Belmura Lad
- 1976 - Chasta Bellota
- 1975 - Rosie Heir
- 1974 - Sydney Cove
- 1973 - Imagele
- 1972 - Lord Ben
- 1971 - Egyptian
- 1970 - Royal Show
- 1969 - Bogan Hero
- 1968 - Broker's Tip
- 1967 - Honeyland
- 1966 - Garcon
- 1965 - Fair Summer
- 1964 - Strauss
- 1963 - Summer Fiesta
- 1962 - Summer Prince
- 1961 - Kilshery
- 1960 - Persian Lyric
- 1959 - Martello Towers
- 1958 - Prince Kerdieil
- 1957 - Todman
- 1956 - Movie Boy
- 1955 - Aboukir
- 1954 - Pride Of Egypt
- 1953 - Prince Morvi
- 1952 - Prince Dakhil
- 1951 - Forest Beau
- 1950 - French Cavalier
- 1949 - Delta
- 1948 - Riptide
- 1947 - The Groom
- 1946 - Decorate
- 1945 - Monmouth
- 1944 - Accession
- 1943 - Moorland
- 1942 - San Sebastian
- 1941 - Chatham's Choice
- 1940 - Ensign
- 1939 - Bonny Loch
- 1938 - Respirator
- 1937 - Bristol
- 1936 - Billy Boy
- 1935 - Hadrian

† Change in scheduling of race from spring to autumn

== See also ==
- List of Australian Group races
- Group races
- Australian Triple Crown of Thoroughbred Racing
