= Delta (horse) =

Australian-bred Thoroughbred racehorse

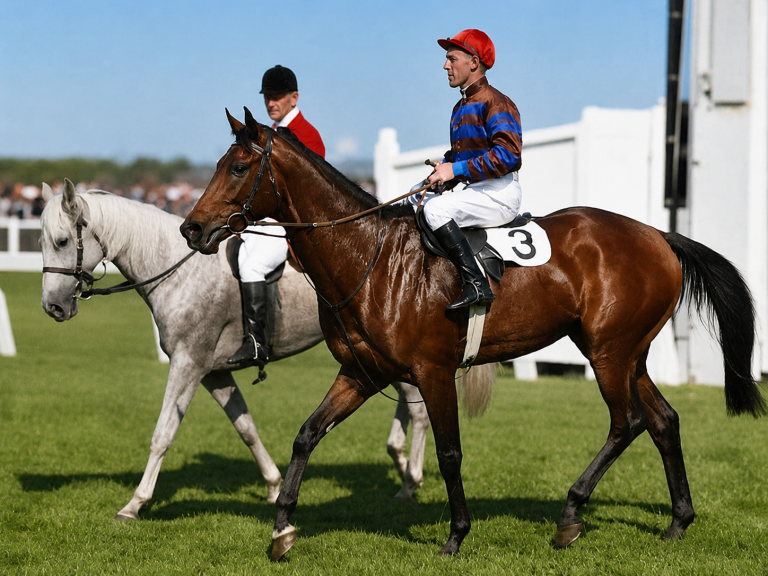
- Delta & Neville Sellwood; Flemington Racecourse
- Sire: Midstream (GB)
- Grandsire: Blandford (IRE)
- Dam: Gazza (AUS)
- Damsire: Magpie (GB)
- Sex: Stallion
- Foaled: 1946
- Country: Australia
- Colour: Bay
- Breeder: Percy Miller Kia-Ora stud
- Owner: Adolph Basser
- Trainer: Maurice McCarten
- Record: 41: 22, 6, 2
- Earnings: £48,801

Major wins
- Canterbury Guineas (1949); VRC Derby (1949); W S Cox Plate (1949); VRC St Leger (1950); VRC Kings Plate (1950); AJC Randwick Plate (1950); Colin Stephen Stakes (1950, 1951); Chelmsford Stakes (1950, 1951, 1952); Metropolitan Handicap (1951); Mackinnon Stakes (1951); Melbourne Cup (1951); St George Stakes (1952); VRC Queens Plate (1952); VRC Carbine Stakes (1952); Chipping Norton Stakes (1952); AJC Cumberland Stakes (1952)

Honours
- Australian Racing Hall of Fame

Delta (1946–1960) was a champion Australian thoroughbred racehorse who raced from a two-year-old to a six-year-old from distances of 6 furlongs to 2 miles. Champion jockey Neville Sellwood won 22 races including the 1949 VRC Derby, 1949 Cox Plate and the 1951 Melbourne Cup. Neville Sellwood was also the regular jockey of the champions Tulloch and Todman. Purchased by owner Adolph Basser for £2,665 at the 1948 Sydney yearling sales he was trained by former jockey and successful trainer Maurice McCarten. He died at Widden Stud in 1960.

== Breeding ==
Delta by Midstream (GB) was bred by studmaster Percy Miller at Kia-Ora stud Scone, New South Wales. Dam Gazza also produced classic winners Deep River 1952 AJC Derby and Midway 1951 VRC St Leger.

== Racing career ==
Delta raced between 1949 -1952 for five seasons winning 7 major races in succession between 1951 – 1952 including a rare triple win in the Chelmsford Stakes also defeated the great champions Hydrogen and Dalray. As a six-year-old Delta defeated the champion Hydrogen in the 1952 Chelmsford Stakes setting an Australasian record for the nine furlongs. This was his last start as soon after injury problems forced his retirement. Delta's racing colours were Brown and dark blue hoops, red cap.

Owner Sir Adolf Basser (1887 – 1964) was an optician, jeweller and philanthropist from Sydney was interested in scientific and medical research and in 1959 founded the Basser College, University of New South Wales Kensington, Sydney.

Delta's racing record: 41 starts for 22 wins, 6 seconds, 2 thirds.

=== 1951 racebook ===
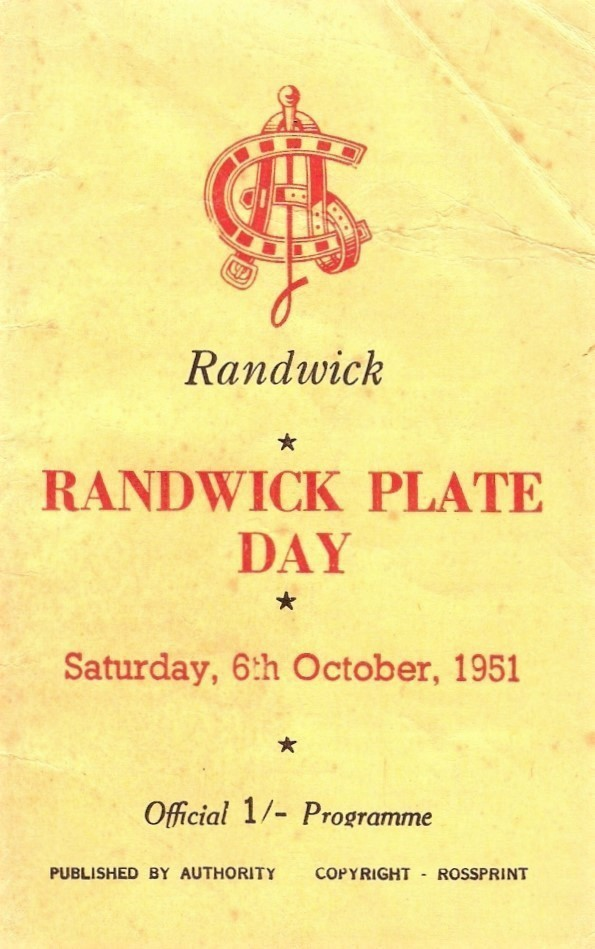
1951 Randwick Plate racebook front cover

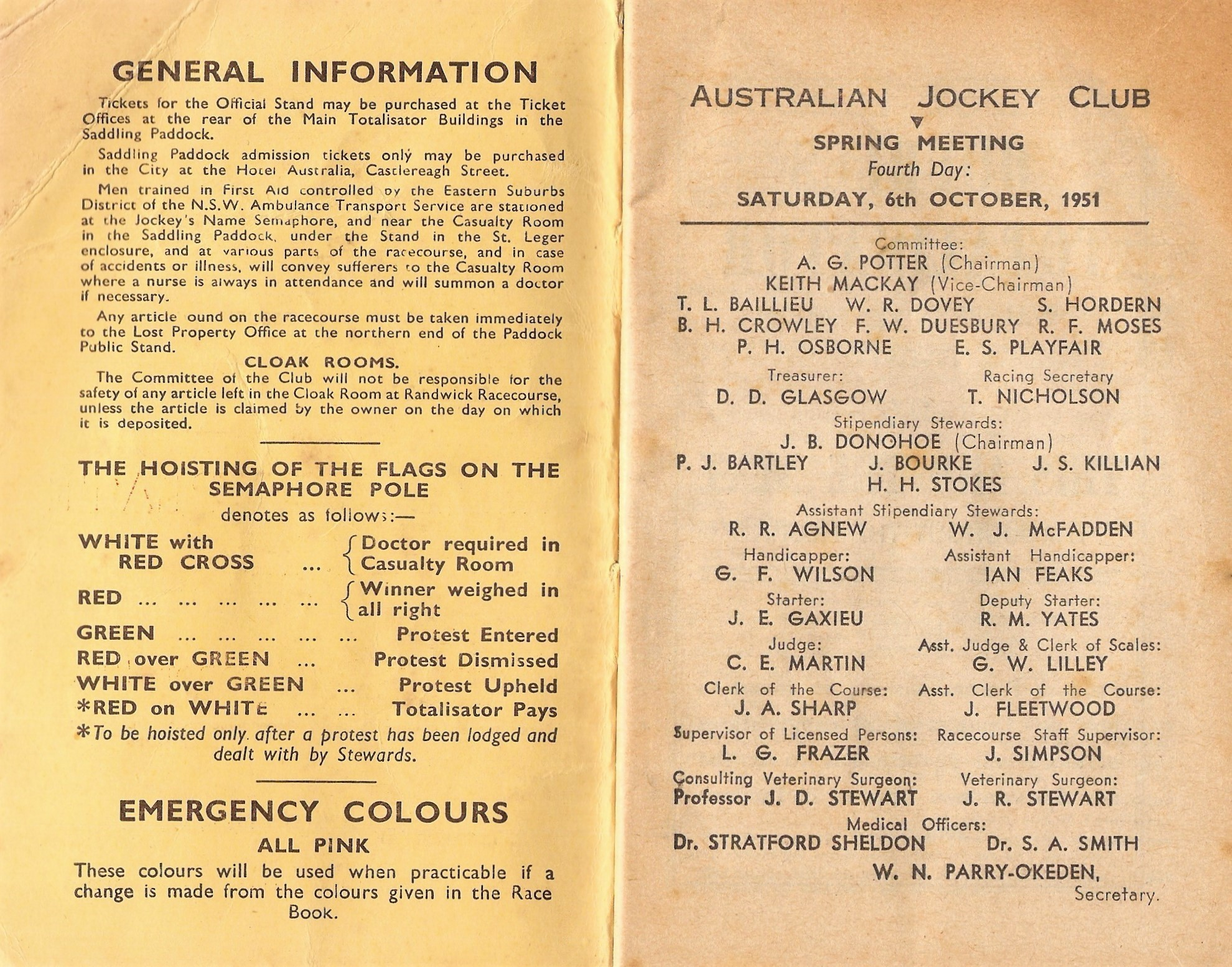
1951 Randwick Plate showing race day officials

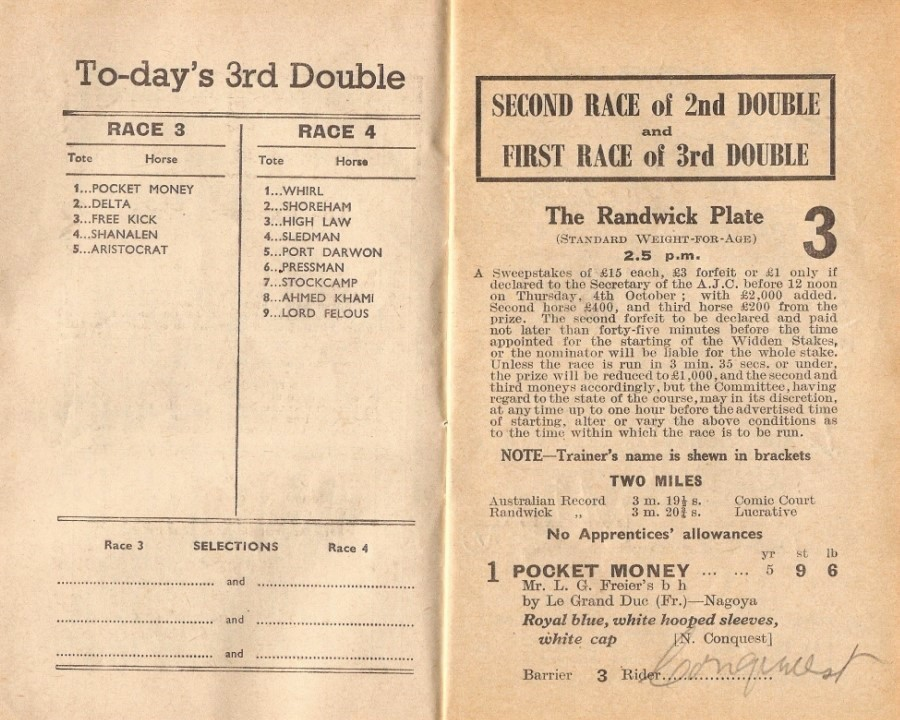
1951 Randwick Plate racebook showing race conditions

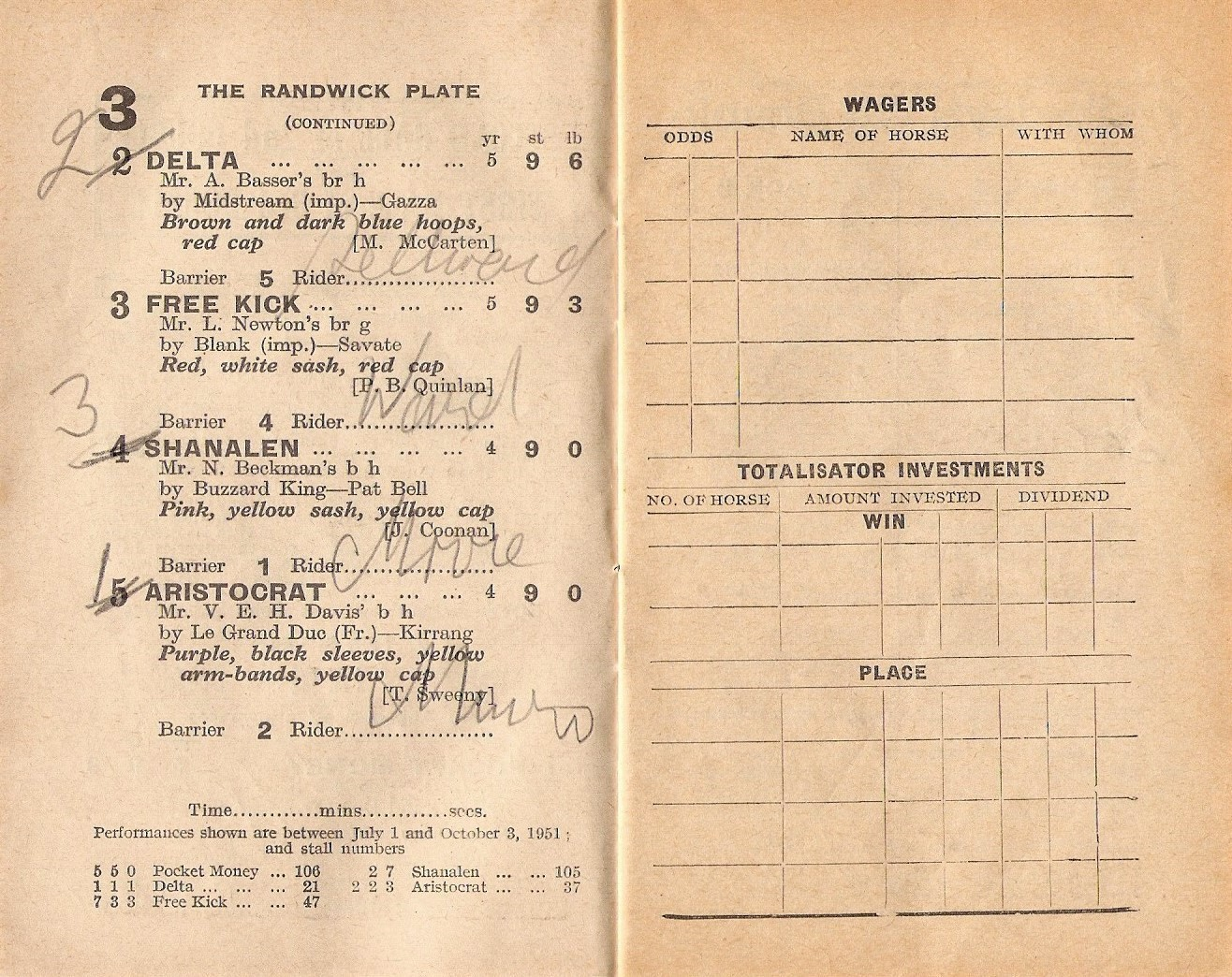
1951 Randwick Plate showing Delta placed 2nd

== See also ==
- Repeat winners of horse races
