= Gloaming Stakes =

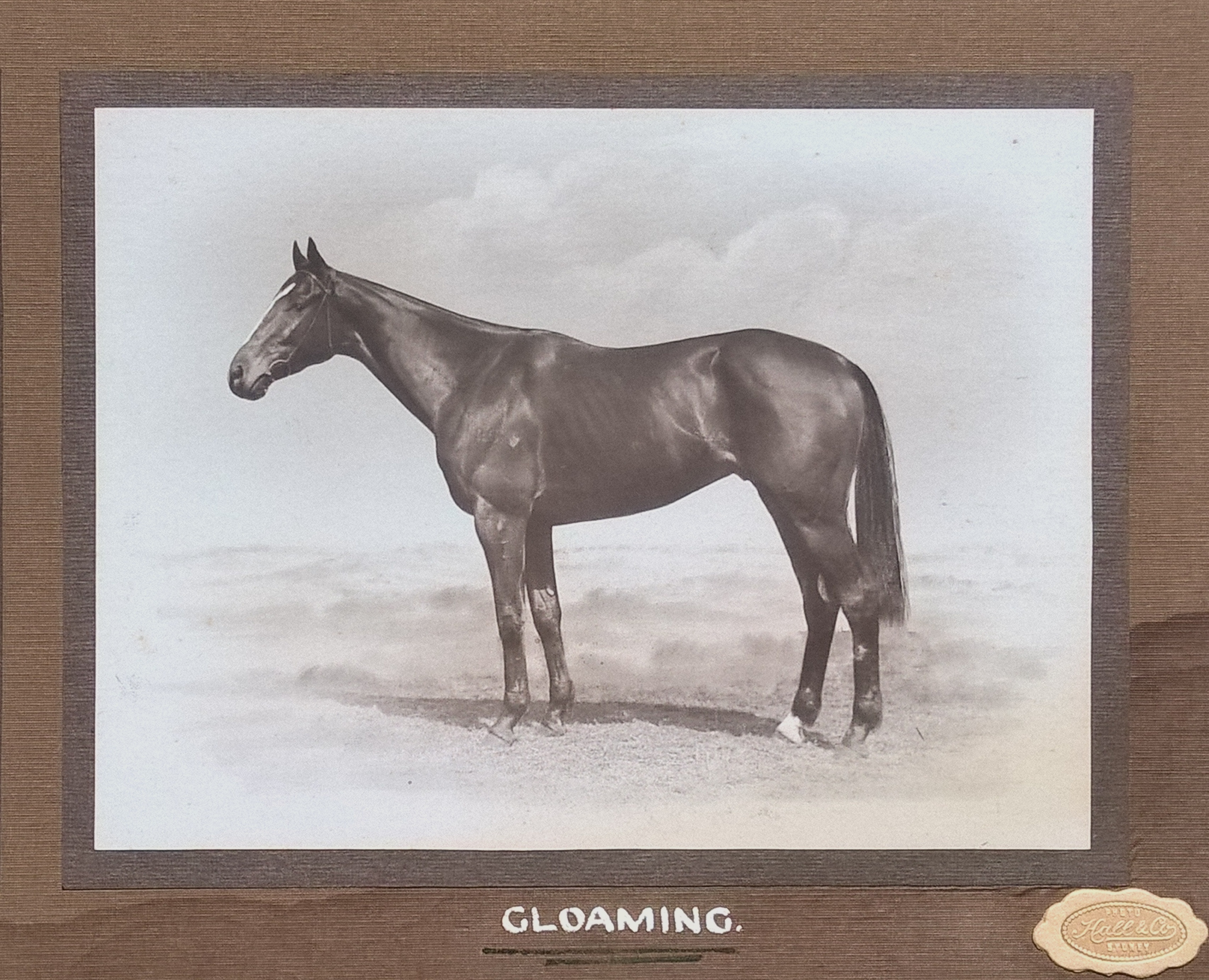
- Gloaming
- Class: Group 3
- Location: Rosehill Racecourse; Sydney, Australia
- Inaugurated: 1978
- Race type: Thoroughbred
- Sponsor: Schweppes (2026)

Race information
- Distance: 1,800 metres
- Surface: Turf
- Track: Right-handed
- Qualification: Three year old
- Weight: Set weights Colts & geldings: 56 1/2kg Fillies: 54 1/2kg
- Purse: A$500,000 (2026)
- Bonuses: Winner exemption from a ballot on the Spring Champion Stakes

The Gloaming Stakes is an Australian Turf Club Group 3 Thoroughbred horse race, for three-year-olds, at set weights, over a distance of 1800 metres, held annually at Rosehill Racecourse, Sydney, Australia in September or October.

== History ==
=== Name ===
The race is named for Gloaming who jointly at one time held the Australasian record (with Desert Gold) of 19 successive wins. Gloaming had 67 race starts, won 57 and was second 9 times.

=== Grade ===
- 1978 - Principal race
- 1979–2004 - Group 2
- 2005 onwards - Group 3

=== Distance ===
- 1978–2000 – 1900 metres
- 2001 – 1750 metres
- 2002 – 1900 metres
- 2003 onwards - 1800 metres
- 2022 - 1600 metres

=== Venue ===
- 1978–1990 - Rosehill Racecourse
- 1991 - Canterbury Park Racecourse
- 1992–2011 - Rosehill Racecourse
- 2012 - Randwick Racecourse
- 2013–2021 - Rosehill Racecourse
- 2022 - Warwick Farm Racecourse
- 2023 onwards - Rosehill Racecourse

== Winners ==
The following are past winners of the race.

- 2026 - Proxima Dea
- 2025 - Shangri La Boy
- 2024 - El Castello
- 2023 - Raf Attack
- 2022 - Sharp 'n' Smart
- 2021 - Head Of State
- 2020 - Love Tap
- 2019 - Shadow Hero
- 2018 - Thinkin' Big
- 2017 - Ace High
- 2016 - Veladero
- 2015 - Vanbrugh
- 2014 - Swaynesse
- 2013 - Complacent
- 2012 - It's A Dundeel
- 2011 - Strike The Stars
- 2010 - Retrieve
- 2009 - So You Think
- 2008 - Predatory Pricer
- 2007 - †race not held
- 2006 - All Black Gold
- 2005 - Pendragon
- 2004 - Al Maher
- 2003 - Tsuimai
- 2002 - Maskerado
- 2001 - Courvoisier
- 2000 - Go Bint
- 1999 - Fairway
- 1998 - Arena
- 1997 - Tie The Knot
- 1996 - Magic Of Sydney
- 1995 - Classy Fella
- 1994 - Brave Warrior
- 1993 - Constant Flight
- 1992 - Air Seattle
- 1991 - Big Dreams
- 1990 - Lord Revenir
- 1989 - Stargazer
- 1988 - Run Straight Run
- 1987 - Sky Chase
- 1986 - Drought
- 1985 - Handy Proverb
- 1984 - Phillip
- 1983 - Sir Dapper
- 1982 - Grosvenor
- 1981 - Best Western
- 1980 - Cosmic Planet
- 1979 - Kingston Town
- 1978 - Kapalaran

† Not held because of outbreak of equine influenza

== See also ==
- Alan Brown Stakes
- Hill Stakes
- Roman Consul Stakes
- The Nivison
- List of Australian Group races
- Group races
