= Gerry Harvey =

Australian entrepreneur (born 1939)

- Born: Gerald Harvey; 18 September 1939 (age 87); Springwood, New South Wales, Australia
- Other name: Gerry Harvey
- Occupation: Entrepreneur
- Years active: 1956−present
- Known for: Co-founder of Harvey Norman; Co-owner, Magic Millions
- Spouses: Lynette Harvey; Katie Page (m. 1988)
- Children: 4

Gerald Harvey (born 18 September 1939) is an Australian entrepreneur best known for being the executive chairman of Harvey Norman Holdings, a company which runs Australian retail chain Harvey Norman. He co-founded it with Ian Norman in 1982.

== Biography ==
Harvey was born in rural New South Wales and attended school at Bathurst and Katoomba before moving to Sydney to go to university when he was 17, but he dropped out. He got his start early, selling vacuum cleaners and fridges door-to-door for Goodwins of Newtown. When he was younger, Harvey was determined to be a farmer.

"I went to university for a couple of years and I didn't enjoy university. The studying and the accountancy, economics, I just hated that stuff. Now the irony is here I am lawyer, accountant, I do it all day every day and sit at a desk. So I've never ended up where I wanted to be in many ways. I always wanted to be a farmer."

— Gerry Harvey

Harvey first met Ian Norman while both were working as door-to-door vacuum salesmen. They partnered to open their first store in Sydney in 1961. The chain, which was called Norman Ross, expanded to forty-two stores with annual sales of A$240 million by 1979. This company was sold in 1982 to firstly Grace Bros. for $23 million, then was onsold to Alan Bond's Walton Bond company. After that transaction was completed, Harvey was sacked via order from Alan Bond by John Walton. This action was spoken about in Harvey's first ad for his next venture. Harvey, with Ian Norman as a silent partner, started Harvey Norman that same year through its first store in Auburn, NSW. It then expanded and now owns the retailers Domayne, and Joyce Mayne, along with numerous other, smaller businesses. Harvey adopts a very hands-on approach to his business, appearing as a spokesman during radio adverts for Harvey Norman. He frequently gives comment on economic and business matters in the national press and television media and has a sizeable public profile. He is generally regarded as a slightly maverick businessman and is often critical of Australian CEOs, particularly when it comes to remuneration. He often states that no one is worth the millions they earn and that if they think they are worth more, they can be paid in options and shares.

In 1999, Harvey partnered with George Goh Ching Wah of multi-national retailer Ossia International Limited to establish a $S33 million joint venture named Harvey Norman Ossia (Asia) to retail the Harvey Norman brand in Asia.

In January 2011, Harvey was embroiled in a widely condemned campaign, backed by a number of brick-and-mortar Australian retailers, to scrap tax rules that allowed Australians to shop on overseas websites without paying GST. In response to the campaign, the Federal Government asked the Productivity Commission to investigate and report on the retail industry. Harvey subsequently said the report was a waste of time and money, and that he did not read it.

=== Thoroughbred business interests ===
Over the last decade he has become increasingly involved in breeding with race horses, and he owns Baramul Stud. Harvey has one of the world's largest thoroughbred portfolio, with over 600 thoroughbreds in his stables. He also owns 50% of Magic Millions, one of the largest and most expensive thoroughbred auction events in the Australian racing industry.

== Personal life ==
Harvey has two children with his first wife, Lynette. He remarried to Katie Page in 1988; they have two children. In 1999, Page became the CEO of Harvey Norman.

In an interview in 2008, Harvey described giving charity to the homeless as "a waste", and said that it was "helping a whole heap of no-hopers to survive for no good reason". He later claimed the comments were taken out of context and he did give money to homeless charities, among others.

In 2016, Harvey expressed contempt for what he saw as political uncertainty since John Howard left office, and said the only solution is "to have a dictator like in China".

=== Net worth ===
In 2014, the Business Review Weekly (BRW) assessed Harvey's net worth at A$1.55 billion; an increase of A$9 million on the 2013 BRW Rich 200 list. From 2013 up to and including 2020, the BRW/Financial Review assessed Harvey's wealth as an individual. From 2021, the Financial Review assessed the combined net worth of Harvey and Page jointly. The most recent review, completed in May 2025, assessed the joint wealth of Harvey and Page as A$3.82 billion, as published in the Financial Review 2025 Rich List.

Year	Financial Review Rich List		Forbes Australia's 50 Richest	
Year	Rank	Net worth (A$)	Rank	Net worth (US$)
2013^{[note 1]}	24	$1.46 billion	28 ▼	$0.93 billion ▲
2014^{[note 1]}	21 ▲	$1.55 billion ▲	20 ▲	$1.18 billion ▲
2015			18 ▲	$1.30 billion ▲
2016			19 ▼	$1.35 billion ▲
2017^{[note 1]}	21	$2.34 billion ▲	25 ▼	
2018^{[note 1]}	28 ▼	$2.12 billion ▼		
2019^{[note 1]}	40 ▼	$1.90 billion ▼	32 ▼	$1.35 billion ▼
2020^{[note 1]}	31 ▲	$2.57 billion ▲		
2021^{[note 2]}	28 ▲	$3.20 billion ▲		
2022^{[note 2]}	32 ▼	$3.30 billion ▲		
2023^{[note 2]}	37 ▼	$2.91 billion ▼		
2024^{[note 2]}	38 ▼	$3.39 billion ▲		
2025^{[note 2]}	39 ▼	$3.82 billion ▲		

Legend
Icon	Description
Steady	Has not changed from the previous year
▲	Has increased from the previous year
▼	Has decreased from the previous year

== Notes ==
- ^note 1: 2013–2020 = BRW/Financial Review assessed the net worth of Harvey only
- ^note 2: Since 2021 = Financial Review assessed the combined net worth of Harvey and Page jointly
