= Red Carpet Stakes =

- Class: Grade III
- Location: Del Mar Racetrack; Del Mar, California, United States
- Inaugurated: 1968 (at Hollywood Park Racetrack as Beverly Hills Handicap)
- Race type: Thoroughbred - Flat racing

Race information
- Distance: 1 3/8 miles
- Surface: Turf
- Track: Left-handed
- Qualification: Fillies & Mares, 3-years-old & up
- Weight: Assigned
- Purse: $100,000

The Red Carpet Stakes is an American Thoroughbred horse race held annually (as of 2014) during Del Mar racetrack's fall meet which has been created to accommodate the overflow of established races from closing of Hollywood Park. The Grade III is run over a distance of 1 3/8 miles on turf, and is open to fillies and mares three years of age and older.

Originally the event was a Grade I race from 1988, then in 2003 The American Graded Stakes Committee of the Thoroughbred Owners and Breeders Association amended its status to a Grade II event. Since 2010 the event is a Grade IIIT.

Of note, is that Hall of Fame jockey Bill Shoemaker, who retired from riding in 1990, earned his first Grade I win as a trainer in the 1991 edition of the Beverly Hills Handicap with the filly, Alcando.

Since the inaugural running in 1968, the Beverly Hills Handicap has been contested at various distances:

- 1 3/8 miles : 1968-1975, 2014-2019
- 1 1/8 miles : 1976-1985, 1987-1995
- 1 1/4 miles : 1986, 1996-2011

== Records ==
Speed record: (at distance of 1 1/4 miles)

- 1:58.56 - Astra (2002)

Most wins:

- 2 - La Zanzara (1974, 1975)
- 2 - Swingtime (1977, 1978)
- 2 - Flawlessly (1992, 1993)
- 2 - Astra (2001, 2002)
- 2 - Black Mamba (NZ) (2008, 2009)

Most wins by a jockey:

- 6 - Chris McCarron (1979, 1989, 1992, 1993, 1995, 1996)

Most wins by a trainer:

- 10 - Charlie Whittingham (1973, 1974, 1975, 1977, 1978, 1986, 1988, 1989, 1992, 1993)

== Winners ==
Year	Winner	Age	Jockey	Trainer	Owner	Time
2024	Mrs. Astor	4	Vincent Cheminaud	Jonathan Thomas	Augustin Stable	2:16.82
2023	Linda's Gift	4	T. J. Pereira	Richard E. Mandella	Vincent Varvaro et al.	2:17.80
2022	Bellstreet Bridie	3	Flavien Prat	Mark Glatt	Red Baron's Barn LLC and Rancho Temescal LLC	2:15.67
2021	Neige Blanche	4	Juan Hernandez	Leonard Powell	Madaket Stables, Laura De Seroux, Marsha Naify and Mathilde Powell	2:15.45
2020	Orglandes	4	Irad Ortiz Jr.	Chad Brown	Michael Dubb, Madekat Stables and Wonder Stables	2:15.85
2019	Zuzanna	5	Paco Lopez	Robert B. Hess, Jr.	Ferguson, Hoover, Lambert, et al.	2:16.29
2018	India Mantuana	4	Tyler Baze	Ray Bell	Richard A. Bell	2:14.50
2017	How Unusual	4	Corey Nakatani	Michael Pender	Pender Racing, Bob Fetkin, et al.	2:14.92
2016	Nuovo Record (JPN)	5	Yasunari Iwata	Makoto Saito	Reiko Hara	2:15.56
2015	Rusty Slipper	5	Silvestre de Sousa	H. Graham Motion	RMJ Stables	2:15.34
2014	Three Hearts	4	Joe Talamo	Neil Drysdale	Team Valor International	2:15.54
2013	no race					
2012	Capital Plan	4	Joel Rosario	Jerry Hollendorfer	Hollendorfer/Dedomenico/Pickens	2:04.21
2011	Malibu Pier	4	Brice Blanc	Carla Gaines	Spendthrift Farm	2:01.01
2010	Turning Top	4	Brice Blanc	Simon Callaghan	Michael Tabor	2:01.69
2009	Black Mamba	6	Garrett Gomez	John W. Sadler	Doubledown Stable	1:59.72
2008	Black Mamba	5	Garrett Gomez	John W. Sadler	Double Down Stables	2:01.25
2007	Citronnade	4	David Flores	Robert J. Frankel	Frank Stronach	2:01.47
2006	Memorette	4	Victor Espinoza	Bill Currin	Betty Currin	2:00.16
2005	Megahertz	6	Alex Solis	Robert J. Frankel	Michael Bello	2:01.78
2004	Light Jig	4	Alex Solis	Robert J. Frankel	Khalid Abdullah	2:01.52
2003	Voodoo Dancer	5	Corey Nakatani	Christophe Clement	Green Hills Farm	2:00.80
2002	Astra	6	Kent Desormeaux	Laura de Seroux	Allen E. Paulson	1:58.56
2001	Astra	5	Kent Desormeaux	Simon Bray	Allen E. Paulson	1:59.61
2000	Happyanunoit	5	Brice Blanc	Robert J. Frankel	John & Jerry Amerman	1:59.32
1999	Virginie	5	Laffit Pincay, Jr.	Richard Mandella	Rio Claro Thoroughbreds	2:00.21
1998	Squeak	4	Gary Stevens	Ben D. Cecil	Gary A. Tanaka	2:01.56
1997	Windsharp	6	Corey Nakatani	Wallace Dollase	R&M Stephen/Thbd Corp	2:00.60
1996	Different	4	Chris McCarron	Ron McAnally	Sidney H. Craig	2:00.74
1995	Alpride	4	Chris McCarron	Ron McAnally	Jenny Craig	1:46.67
1994	Corrazona	4	Gary Stevens	Richard Mandella	La Presle Farm	1:47.40
1993	Flawlessly	5	Chris McCarron	Charlie Whittingham	Harbor View Farm	1:47.00
1992	Flawlessly	4	Chris McCarron	Charlie Whittingham	Harbor View Farm	1:47.13
1991	Alcando	5	Jesse J. Garcia	Bill Shoemaker	N. Cowan & A. Speelman	1:46.50
1990	Beautiful Melody *	4	Kent Desormeaux	Richard Mandella	Golden Eagle Farm	1:47.00
1990	Reluctant Guest *	4	Robbie Davis	Richard Mandella	Robert S. Folsom	1:47.00
1989	Claire Marine	4	Chris McCarron	Charlie Whittingham	S. L. Port & Whittingham	1:47.20
1988	Fitzwilliam Place	4	Aaron Gryder	Charlie Whittingham	Bruce McNall	1:47.20
1987	Auspiciante	6	Pat Valenzuela	Ron McAnally	Jack Kent Cooke	1:46.20
1986	Estrapade	6	Fernando Toro	Charlie Whittingham	Allen E. Paulson	1:59.00
1985	Johnica	4	Gary Stevens	Bruce Headley	Golden Eagle Farm	1:48.20
1984	Royal Heroine	4	Fernando Toro	John Gosden	Robert Sangster	1:47.20
1983	Absentia	4	Fernando Toro	John Gosden	Robert Sangster & Sucher	1:49.00
1982	Sangue	4	Bill Shoemaker	Henry M. Moreno	R. Charlene Parks	1:47.40
1981	Track Robbery	5	Pat Valenzuela	Robert L. Wheeler	Summa Stable	1:46.80
1980	Country Queen	5	Laffit Pincay, Jr.	RandyWinick	Blum, Sarant & Winick	1:47.00
1979	Giggling Girl	5	Chris McCarron	Edwin J. Gregson	Mrs. Montgomery Fisher	1:47.60
1978	Swingtime	6	Fernando Toro	Charlie Whittingham	M. J. Bradley/Whittingham	1:48.40
1977	Swingtime	5	Fernando Toro	Charlie Whittingham	M. J. Bradley/Whittingham	1:48.40
1976	Bastonera	5	Laffit Pincay, Jr.	Henry Moreno	Ann K. Elmore	1:50.20
1975	La Zanzara	5	Don Pierce	Charlie Whittingham	Aaron U. Jones	2:14.80
1974	La Zanzara	4	Don Pierce	Charlie Whittingham	Aaron U. Jones	2:14.20
1973	Le Cle	4	Bill Shoemaker	Charlie Whittingham	Howard B. Keck	2:14.80
1972	Hill Circus	4	Bill Shoemaker	John H. Adams	El Peco Ranch	2:13.20
1971	Manta	5	Laffit Pincay, Jr.	Farrell W. Jones	Elmendorf	2:12.20
1970	Pattee Canyon	5	Bill Shoemaker	Stanley M. Reiser	Barbara Hunter	2:13.00
1969	Miss Ribot	4	Don Pierce	Frank E. Childs	P. L. & C. T. Grissom	2:16.40
1968	Pink Pigeon	4	Wayne Harris	Paul K. Parker	Preston Madden	2:15.00

*In 1990 there was a dead heat for first place.
