= Robert J. Frankel Stakes =

- Class: Grade III
- Location: Santa Anita; Arcadia, California
- Inaugurated: 1968 (as San Gorgonio Handicap)
- Race type: Thoroughbred – Flat racing
- Website: Santa Anita Park

Race information
- Distance: 1 1/8 miles
- Surface: Turf
- Track: left-handed
- Qualification: Fillies and mares, three-year-old and older
- Weight: Base weights with allowances: 4-year-olds and older: 125 lbs. 3-year-olds: 123 lbs.
- Purse: $100,000 (since 2020)

The Robert J. Frankel Stakes is a Grade III American Thoroughbred horse race for fillies and mares age three and older run over a distance of one and one-eighth miles (9 furlongs) on the turf track held annually in late December at Santa Anita Park in Arcadia, California, USA. The event currently offers a purse of $100,000.

== History ==
The inaugural running of the event was on 4 January 1968 as the San Gorgonio Handicap, a sprint over the Downhill turf course over a distance of about 6 1/2 furlongs for horses that were four years old or older. The event was won by Tumble Weed who was trained by US Hall of Fame trainer Charles E. Whittingham in a time of 1:13 3/5.

The event was named after a landmarks in Southern California, known as San Gorgonio Pass, San Gorgonio Mountain. a mountain in the San Bernardino Mountains and the former town of San Gorgonio now called Beaumont.

The following year the event was scheduled as a claiming stakes event held over a distance of 1 1/8 miles and was called the San Gorgonio Claiming Stakes. In 1970 the event was not held.

In 1976 Santa Anita Track Administration changed the conditions of the event to a handicap for four-year-old fillies and mares and changing the name of the event back to San Gorgonio Handicap. The winner was the seven-year-old Chilean-bred mare Tizna, who carried a record weight of 132 lbs to victory by a nose as the 9/5 favorite.

In 1977 the event was run twice. Once in January and the second time in December when track administration scheduled the event earlier for the 1977–1978 Racing season. Hence, the event was not held in 1978 when the scheduled back in its January time slot.

In 1983 the American Graded Stakes Committee classified the event as Grade III and upgraded the race in 1985 to Grade II.

The event was renamed in 2010 to honor the late Hall of Fame trainer Robert J. Frankel who had trained eight winners of the event.

In 2012 the event was downgraded back to Grade III.

The 2016 Robert J. Frankel Stakes lost its Grade III classification when, for safety reasons, the race was switched from the turf course to the dirt track.

In 2021 the event was scheduled to be held on the last day of the year but due to wet conditions Santa Anita administration moved the event to New Year's Day. Hence the conditions of the event were for four-year-olds and over.

== Records ==
Time record:

- 1 1/8 miles: 1:46.40 – Castilla (1983), Invited Guest (1990)

Margins:

- 15 lengths – Miss Magnetic (1980)

Most wins by a jockey:

- 5 – Laffit Pincay Jr. (1971, 1973, 1978, 1987, 1994)
- 5 – Chris McCarron (1983, 1991, 1992, 1998, 2002)
- 5 – Corey Nakatani (1993, 1996, 1996, 1997, 2016)

Most wins by a trainer:

- 8 – Robert J. Frankel (1973, 1996, 1997, 1999, 2001, 2003, 2004, 2007)

Most wins by an owner:

- 2 – Sidney Craig (1992, 1998)
- 2 – Juddmonte Farms (1996, 2003)
- 2 – 3 Plus U Stable (1997, 2001)
- 2 – Stronach Stables (1994, 2007)
- 2 – Abbondanza Racing (2016, 2017)

== Winners ==
Year	Winner	Age	Jockey	Trainer	Owner	Distance	Time	Purse	Grade	Ref
Robert J. Frankel Stakes
2026	Paradise Lake	5	Juan J. Hernandez	Peter Eurton	C R K Stable	1 1/8 miles	1:50.72	$101,500	III	
2025	Race not held									
2024	Mrs. Astor	4	Frankie Dettori	Jonathan Thomas	Augustin Stable	1 1/8 miles	1:48.57	$100,000	III	
2023	Angel Nadeshiko	4	Antonio Fresu	Patrick Gallagher	U.S. Equine	1 1/8 miles	1:50.69	$100,500	III	
2022 (Dec)	Queen Goddess	4	John R. Velazquez	Michael McCarthy	Eclipse Thoroughbred Partners & Gary Barber	1 1/8 miles	1:48.35	$102,500	III	
2022 (Jan)	Luck	5	Flavien Prat	Richard Baltas	LNJ Foxwoods	1 1/8 miles	1:48.26	$101,000	III	
2021	Race not held									
2020	Mucho Unusual	4	John R. Velazquez	Tim Yakteen	George Krikorian	1 1/8 miles	1:48.32	$101,500	III	
2019	Mirth	4	Mike E. Smith	Philip D'Amato	Little Red Feather Racing	1 1/8 miles	1:48.32	$101,053	III	
2018	Fahan Mura	4	Edwin A. Maldonado	Vladimir Cerin	Bran Jam Stable	1 1/8 miles	1:46.85	$151,035	III	
2017	Midnight Crossing (IRE)	4	Brice Blanc	Richard Baltas	Abbondanza Racing & Medallion Racing	1 1/8 miles	1:48.10	$100,345	III	
2016	Goodyearforroses (IRE)	4	Corey Nakatani	Richard Baltas	Abbondanza Racing	1 1/8 miles	1:51.42	$98,000	Listed	Off turf
2015	Gender Agenda (GB)	4	Rafael Bejarano	Carla Gaines	Keith Brackpool, Alon Ossip, Timothy Ritvo	1 1/8 miles	1:50.29	$101,750	III	
2014	Lady Pimpernel (GB)	4	Victor Espinoza	Carla Gaines	Triton Racing	1 1/8 miles	1:49.96	$101,000	III	
2013	Customer Base	4	Mike E. Smith	Thomas F. Proctor	Glen Hill Farm	1 1/8 miles	1:46.45	$101,000	III	
2012	Qaraaba (GB)	5	Julien R. Leparoux	Simon Callaghan	Alice Bamford & Michael B. Tabor	1 1/8 miles	1:49.20	$151,000	III	December
2012	Bauble Queen	4	Garrett K. Gomez	J. Eric Kruljac	Class Racing Stable	1 1/8 miles	1:48.22	$150,000	II	January
2011	Spring Style (IRE)	6	Garrett K. Gomez	Ben D. A. Cecil	Kristy Cecil & Zillah Reddam	1 1/8 miles	1:51.08	$147,000	II	
San Gorgonio Handicap
2010	Cat by the Tale	5	Joel Rosario	Neil D. Drysdale	Raymond Keogh	1 1/8 miles	1:48.17	$150,000	II	
2009	Tizfiz	5	Agapito Delgadillo	Rafael DeLeon	Brian Kahn & Richard J. O'Neill Trust	1 1/8 miles	1:49.62	$150,000	II	
2008	Wait A While	5	Garrett K. Gomez	Todd A. Pletcher	Arindel Farm	1 1/8 miles	1:46.81	$150,000	II	
2007	Citronnade	4	David R. Flores	Robert J. Frankel	Stronach Stables	1 1/8 miles	1:46.80	$150,000	II	
2006	Silver Cup (IRE)	4	Victor Espinoza	Patrick L. Biancone	Martin S. Schwartz	1 1/8 miles	1:47.46	$150,000	II	
2005	Fencelineneighbor	5	Luis H. Jauregui	Michael Machowsky	Amerman Racing	1 1/8 miles	1:49.82	$150,000	III	Off turf
2004	Megahertz (GB)	5	Alex O. Solis	Robert J. Frankel	Michael Bello	1 1/8 miles	1:49.51	$147,000	II	
2003	Tates Creek	5	Pat Valenzuela	Robert J. Frankel	Juddmonte Farms	1 1/8 miles	1:46.91	$150,000	II	
2002	Tout Charmant	6	Chris McCarron	Ron McAnally	Stonerside Stable	1 1/8 miles	1:47.22	$150,000	II	
2001	Uncharted Haven (GB)	4	Alex O. Solis	Robert J. Frankel	3 Plus U Stable	1 1/8 miles	1:50.02	$150,000	II	
2000	Lady At Peace	4	Garrett K. Gomez	Edwin J. Gregson	Jon & Sarah Kelly	1 1/8 miles	1:48.75	$150,000	II	
1999	See You Soon (FR)	5	Kent J. Desormeaux	Robert J. Frankel	Charles Kenis	1 1/8 miles	1:49.14	$150,000	II	
1998	Golden Arches (FR)	4	Chris McCarron	Ron McAnally	Sidney H. Craig	1 1/8 miles	1:49.42	$161,450	II	
1997	Sixieme Sens	5	Corey Nakatani	Robert J. Frankel	3 Plus U Stable	1 1/8 miles	1:47.16	$132,950	II	
1996	Wandesta (GB)	5	Corey Nakatani	Robert J. Frankel	Juddmonte Farms	1 1/8 miles	1:49.13	$130,550	II	
1995	Queens Court Queen	6	Corey Nakatani	Ron McAnally	Alex G. Campbell Jr.	1 1/8 miles	1:48.70	$107,000	II	Off turf
1994	Hero's Love	6	Laffit Pincay Jr.	Rafael Becerra	Frank Stronach	1 1/8 miles	1:47.65	$111,800	II	
1993	Southern Truce	5	Corey Nakatani	Roger M. Stein	Regal Rose Stable	1 1/8 miles	1:51.28	$112,100	II	Off turf
1992	Paseana (ARG)	5	Chris McCarron	Ron McAnally	Sidney H. Craig	1 1/8 miles	1:53.88	$130,375	II	Off turf
1991	Royal Touch (IRE)	6	Chris McCarron	Charles E. Whittingham	Mohammed bin Rashid Al Maktoum	1 1/8 miles	1:47.80	$140,100	II	
1990	Invited Guest (IRE)	6	Russell Baze	Richard E. Mandella	Randall D. Hubbard	1 1/8 miles	1:46.40	$140,000	II	
1989	No Review	4	Rafael Q. Meza	Christopher Speckert	Buckland Farm	1 1/8 miles	1:48.80	$136,200	II	Off turf
1988	Miss Alto	5	Eddie Delahoussaye	Jerry M. Fanning	Jerry Arnold & Stan Huller	1 1/8 miles	1:49.20	$108,200	II	Off turf
1987	Frau Altiva (ARG)	5	Laffit Pincay Jr.	Henry M. Moreno	Nita Brooks, Louis Lee Brooks Jr. & Leigh Lawrence	1 1/8 miles	1:50.20	$108,100	II	
1986	Mountain Bear (GB)	5	Eddie Delahoussaye	Darrell Vienna	Bob Forgnone, Richard Levy, Chuck Marquis, Dean Stern, Joe Sharer & Jim Franklin	1 1/8 miles	1:48.40	$112,500	II	
1985	Fact Finder	6	Fernando Toro	Charles E. Whittingham	Nelson Bunker Hunt	1 1/8 miles	1:48.20	$107,500	II	
1984	First Advance	5	Marco Castaneda	Frank T. Rappa	Margaret & Frank Rappa	1 1/8 miles	1:48.80	$89,950	III	
1983	Castilla	4	Chris McCarron	Charles E. Whittingham	Mary Jones Bradley	1 1/8 miles	1:46.40	$84,550	III	
1982	Track Robbery	6	Eddie Delahoussaye	Robert L. Wheeler	Summa Stable	1 1/8 miles	1:52.60	$79,700		Off turf
1981	Kilijaro (IRE)	5	Bill Shoemaker	Charles E. Whittingham	Peter M. Brant	1 1/8 miles	1:49.20	$63,300		
1980	§ Miss Magnetic	5	Luis Enrique Ortega	Ron McAnally	Elmendorf Farm	1 1/8 miles	1:50.00	$66,700		Off turf
1979	Via Maris (FR)	4	Angel Cordero Jr.	Angel Penna Sr.	Daniel Wildenstein	1 1/8 miles	1:52.60	$56,500		Off turf
1978	Race not held									
1977	Lucie Manet (ARG)	4	Bill Shoemaker	Jaime Villagomez	John & Donald Valpredo	1 1/8 miles	1:50.80	$52,750	December	Off turf
1977	Merry Lady III (ARG)	4	Laffit Pincay Jr.	Henry M. Moreno	Red Bee Ranch	1 1/8 miles	1:54.00	$58,700	January	Off turf
1976	Tizna (CHI)	7	Fernando Alvarez	Henry M. Moreno	Nile Financial Corp.	1 1/8 miles	1:47.20	$43,800		
San Gorgonio Claiming Stakes
1975	Madison Palace (FRA)	7	Donald Pierce	Farrell W. Jones	Albert Sultan & Peter Valenti	1 1/8 miles	1:48.40	$34,900		
1974	Margum	5	Bill Shoemaker	Tom Pratt	Leone J. Peters	1 1/8 miles	1:50.60	$36,000		Off turf
1973	§ Extra Hand	7	Laffit Pincay Jr.	Robert J. Frankel	Marion R. Frankel	1 1/8 miles	1:49.00	$36,700		Off turf
1972	§ Tradesman	8	Eddie Belmonte	Pancho Martin	Sigmund Sommer	1 1/8 miles	1:49.20	$37,100		
1971	Never Confuse	5	Laffit Pincay Jr.	William J. Hirsch	King Ranch	1 1/8 miles	1:51.60	$30,550		Off turf
1970	Race not held									
1969	Jimmy Peanuts	4	Walter Blum	Roger Laurin	Edward Sawyer	1 1/8 miles	1:52.00	$24,900		
San Gorgonio Handicap
1968	Tumble Wind	4	John Sellers	Charles E. Whittingham	Llangollen Farm Stable & Rock Spring Stable	abt. 6 1/2 furlongs	1:13.60	$23,150		

Legend:
Dirt Turf

Notes:
§ Ran as an entry

== See also ==
List of American and Canadian Graded races
