= Honeymoon Stakes =

- Class: Listed
- Location: Santa Anita Park; Arcadia, California, USA
- Inaugurated: 1952 (as Sea Breeze Stakes at Hollywood Park)
- Race type: Thoroughbred – Flat racing
- Website: Santa Anita Park

Race information
- Distance: 1 1/8 miles (9 furlongs)
- Surface: Turf
- Track: Left-handed
- Qualification: Three-year-old fillies
- Weight: 124 lbs. with allowances
- Purse: US$100,000 (since 2020)

The Honeymoon Stakes is a Listed American Thoroughbred horse race for three-year-old fillies over a distance of one and one-eighth miles on the turf course scheduled annually in late May or early June at Santa Anita Park. The event currently carries a purse of $100,000.

== History ==
The event was inaugurated on 18 May 1952 as the Sea Breeze Stakes and was run at Hollywood Park Racetrack in Inglewood, California before a crowd of 41,369. The event was run over 6 furlongs on the dirt and was won by Tonga in an upset starting at 51-1 defeating Princess Lygia and A Gleam.

The event honors the outstanding California bred mare, Honeymoon who won several races at Hollywood Park including the inaugural running of the Hollywood Oaks in 1946. Honeymoon was also successful at Santa Anita Park winning the 1948 Santa Maria Handicap.

The event was changed to the Honeymoon Stakes in 1956 then the Honeymoon Handicap in 1975.

The event was run in divisions in 1957 and 1965. The event was first run on the turf track in 1973.

The event was a Grade II from 1998 to 2018.

After the closure of the Hollywood Park Racetrack in 2013 the event has been held at Santa Anita Park.

The Honeymoon is a major leading prep race for the Grade I American Oaks run during the first part of July.

In 2026 the Thoroughbred Owners and Breeders Association downgraded the event from Grade III to Listed.

=== Distance ===
Since inception, the race has been contested at a variety of distances:

- 1 1/8 miles : 1996–1999, 2002–present
- 1 1/4 miles : 2001
- 1 1/16 miles : 1971–1995
- 1 mile : 1955–1967, 1970
- 7 furlongs : 1954
- 6 furlongs : 1952–1953

== Records ==
Speed record:

- 1 1/8 mile – 1:46.37 Going Global (IRE) (2021)
- 1 1/16 mile – 1:40.20 Hot Option (1989)

Most wins by a jockey:

- 5 – Eddie Delahoussaye (1987, 1989, 1990, 1993, 1995)

Most wins by a trainer:

- 4 – Charles E. Whittingham (1967, 1971, 1972, 1982)

== Winners ==
Year	Winner	Jockey	Trainer	Owner	Distance	Time	Purse	Grade	Ref
At Santa Anita Park – Honeymoon Stakes
2024	Circle of Trust	Antonio Fresu	Philip D'Amato	James E. Downey	1 1/8 miles	1:48.40	$101,000	III	
2023	Selenaia	Joe Bravo	Jonathan Thomas	Eclipse Thoroughbred Partners & Madaket Stables	1 1/8 miles	1:48.18	$101,500	III	
2022	Cairo Memories	Mike E. Smith	Robert B. Hess Jr.	David A. Bernsen & Schroeder Farms	1 1/8 miles	1:48.67	$100,500	III	
2021	Going Global (IRE)	Flavien Prat	Philip D'Amato	CYBT, Michael Dubb, Saul Gevertz, Michael Nentwig & Ray Pagano	1 1/8 miles	1:46.37	$101,000	III	
2020	Laura's Light	Abel Cedillo	Peter Miller	Gary Barber	1 1/8 miles	1:49.02	$101,500	III	
2019	Lady Prancealot (IRE)	Joseph Talamo	Richard Baltas	J. & M. Iavarone, C. & J. Arntz, J. McClanahan & D. Durando	1 1/8 miles	1:49.08	$150,702	III	
2018	Paved	Gary L. Stevens	Michael W. McCarthy	Ciaglia Racing & Eclipse Thoroughbred Partners	1 1/8 miles	1:48.57	$200,690	II	
2017	Sircat Sally	Mike E. Smith	Jerry Hollendorfer	Joe Turner	1 1/8 miles	1:46.92	$200,345	II	
2016	Cheekaboo	Mike E. Smith	Peter Eurton	Sharon Alesia, Mike Burns & Ciaglia Racing	1 1/8 miles	1:46.86	$201,380	II	
2015	Spanish Queen	Brice Blanc	Richard Baltas	H. Nakkashian, H. Bederian, H. Kamberian	1 1/8 miles	1:47.24	$201,000	II	
2014	Nashoba's Gold	Joseph Talamo	Carla Gaines	Warren B. Williamson	1 1/8 miles	1:48.61	$200,250	II	
At Hollywood Park – Honeymoon Handicap
2013	Sarach	Martin Garcia	Richard E. Mandella	Wertheimer et Frère	1 1/8 miles	1:48.73	$150,750	II	
2012	My Gi Gi	Rafael Bejarano	Peter Eurton	Dennis Conner, Lloyd DeBruycker & Wade Jacobsen	1 1/8 miles	1:49.22	$150,000	II	
2011	Sarah's Secret	Rafael Bejarano	Kathy Walsh	Joan Hadley Thoroughbreds & Al & Sandy Kirkwood	1 1/8 miles	1:50.04	$150,000	II	
2010	Evening Jewel	Victor Espinoza	James M. Cassidy	Tom & Marilyn Braly	1 1/8 miles	1:48.87	$150,000	II	
2009	Well Monied	Joel Rosario	Howard L. Zucker	Carl T. Grether	1 1/8 miles	1:48.35	$150,000	II	
2008	Misty Ocean	Joel Rosario	Jerry Hollendorfer	Jim H. Plemmons	1 1/8 miles	1:47.56	$173,250	II	
Honeymoon Breeders' Cup Handicap
2007	Valbenny (IRE)	Alex O. Solis	Patrick Gallagher	Rita DiPietro, LGL Racing, Michael Rosenmayer et al.	1 1/8 miles	1:48.17	$154,750	II	
2006	Attima (GB)	Victor Espinoza	Julio C. Canani	Anthony Fantcola & Joseph Scardino	1 1/8 miles	1:47.36	$137,150	II	
2005	Three Degrees (IRE)	Gary L. Stevens	Patrick Gallagher	Harlequin Ranches, Mary Rita DePietro, Aaron Wellman et al.	1 1/8 miles	1:46.84	$163,125	II	
2004	Lovely Rafaela	Victor Espinoza	Paulo H. Lobo	TNT Stud	1 1/8 miles	1:49.96	$184,925	II	
2003	Quero Quero	Tyler Baze	Paulo H. Lobo	Old Friends Inc.	1 1/8 miles	1:49.34	$215,950	II	
2002	Megahertz (GB)	Pat Valenzuela	Robert J. Frankel	Michael Bello	1 1/8 miles	1:51.97	$167,050	II	
2001	Innit (IRE)	Chris McCarron	Ron McAnally	Richard Duchossois	1 1/4 miles	2:01.28	$217,000	II	
Honeymoon Handicap
2000	Classy Cara	Ignacio Puglisi	Doug F. O'Neill	Damos Stathatos & John J. Zamora	1 1/8 miles	1:48.05	$150,000	II	
1999	Sweet Ludy (IRE)	Gary L. Stevens	Jenine Sahadi	Team Valor, Heiligbrodt Racing Stables, King, et al.	1 1/8 miles	1:48.05	$108,600	II	
1998	Country Garden (GB)	Kent J. Desormeaux	Walter R. Greenman	Edward T. McGrath	1 1/8 miles	1:48.74	$106,800	II	
1997	Famous Digger	Brice Blanc	Barry Abrams	Let It Ride Stable et al.	1 1/8 miles	1:47.68	$109,100	III	
1996	Antespend	Chris Antley	Ron McAnally	Jack Kent Cooke	1 1/8 miles	1:47.50	$137,350	III	
1995	Auriette (IRE)	Eddie Delahoussaye	Gary F. Jones	Rick Barnes & Prestonwood Farm	1 1/16 miles	1:41.68	$107,100	III	
1994	Work the Crowd	Chris McCarron	Greg Gilchrist	Harris Farms & Maddy	1 1/16 miles	1:39.68	$109,700	III	
‡1993	Likeable Style	Eddie Delahoussaye	Richard E. Mandella	Golden Eagle Farm	1 1/16 miles	1:46.29	$107,200	III	
1992	Pacific Squall	Kent J. Desormeaux	J. Paco Gonzalez	Trudy McCaffery & Joohn Toffan	1 1/16 miles	1:41.02	$112,100	III	
1991	Masake	Martin A. Pedroza	Brian Sweeney	Austin G. E. Taylor	1 1/16 miles	1:42.10	$102,900	III	
1990	Materco	Eddie Delahoussaye	Mark MacDonald	William R. Hawn	1 1/16 miles	1:41.40	$110,800	III	
1989	Hot Option	Eddie Delahoussaye	Neil D. Drysdale	Clover Racing Stable, Luke et al.	1 1/16 miles	1:40.20	$107,600	III	
1988	Do So	Alex O. Solis	Ron McAnally	Jack Kent Cooke	1 1/16 miles	1:41.80	$131,100	III	
1987	Pen Bal Lady (GB)	Eddie Delahoussaye	Hector O. Palma	DeCarlo, LaTorre, Rubenstein et al.	1 1/16 miles	1:41.20	$127,550	III	
1986	An Empress	Pat Valenzuela	Laz Barrera	Harbor View Farm	1 1/16 miles	1:41.80	$111,900	III	
1985	Sharp Ascent	Eddie Delahoussaye	John Gosden	Robert E. Sangster	1 1/16 miles	1:41.40	$111,900	III	
1984	Vagabond Gal	Eddie Delahoussaye	Jerry M. Fanning	Craig B. Singer	1 1/16 miles	1:41.40	$110,100	III	
1983	Stage Door Canteen	Chris McCarron	Laz Barrera	C. Peter Beler	1 1/16 miles	1:42.00	$110,200	III	
1982	Castilla	Ray Sibille	Charles E. Whittingham	Mary Jones Bradley	1 1/16 miles	1:40.60	$106,400	II	
1981	Amber Ever	Chris McCarron	John W. Russell	Mr. & Mrs. Hastings Harcourt	1 1/16 miles	1:41.60	$84,700	II	
1980	†Lady Roberta	Sandy Hawley	Bud Delp	Windfields Farm	1 1/16 miles	1:40.60	$105,050	III	
1979	Variety Queen	Rudy Rosales	Bruce Headley	Kjell Qvale	1 1/16 miles	1:41.60	$55,050	III	
1978	Country Queen	Marco Castaneda	Randy Winick	Maribel G. Blum	1 1/16 miles	1:43.20	$55,200	III	
1977	Joyous Ways	Laffit Pincay Jr.	Julius E. Tinsley Jr.	Fred W. Hooper	1 1/16 miles	1:43.00	$44,150	III	
1976	Cascapedia	Bill Shoemaker	Gordon C. Campbell	Bernard J. Ridder	1 1/16 miles	1:42.20	$44,750	III	
1975	Katonka	Laffit Pincay Jr.	Laz Barrera	Happy Valley Farm	1 1/16 miles	1:42.20	$55,650	III	
Honeymoon Stakes
1974	Bedknob	Álvaro Pineda	Jerry M. Fanning	Samuel J. "Jay" Agnew	1 1/16 miles	1:42.20	$34,250	Listed	
1973	Meilleur	Donald Pierce	John H. Adams	El Peco Ranch (George A. Pope)	1 1/16 miles	1:42.40	$33,850	Listed	
1972	†Le Cle	Laffit Pincay Jr.	Charles E. Whittingham	Elizabeth A. Keck	1 1/16 miles	1:42.40	$33,700		
1971	Turkish Trousers	Bill Shoemaker	Charles E. Whittingham	Elizabeth A. Keck	1 1/16 miles	1:42.40	$33,500		
1970	Street Dancer	Rudy Rosales	John G. Canty	William T. Brady	1 mile	1:34.60	$27,800		
1969	Marjorie's Theme	Jerry Lambert	Gordon C. Campbell	Mr. & Mrs. Norman Alperson	1 1/16 miles	1:41.60	$28,050		
1968	Miss Ribot	John Sellers	Frank E. Childs	Perne L. & Charles T. Grissom	1 1/16 miles	1:42.20	$27,950		
1967	Spinning Around	Milo Valenzuela	Charles E. Whittingham	Oxford Stable	1 mile	1:36.60	$28,550		
1966	April Dawn	Dean Hall	Harold C. McBride	Hemacinto (Phillip Stein) & Billrick Stable (Allan Lazaroff)	1 mile	1:36.40	$33,800		
1965	Rullahline	Dave Gorman	John G. Canty	Neil S. McCarthy	1 mile	1:35.80	$32,825		Division 1
1965	Mine Lovely	Ismael Valenzuela	Robert L. Wheeler	Peter McBean	1 mile	1:35.40	$33,325		Division 2
1964	Gim Mah	Eddie Burns	Frank Colcord	Mr. & Mrs. Frank Colcord	1 mile	1:37.20	$27,500		
1963	Molly O'Malley	Raymond York	Robert Wingfield	William Radkovich & Raymond Wilson	1 mile	1:37.40	$28,800		
1962	Refanute	Rudy Campas	Harold C. McBride	Horace L. Miller	1 mile	1:36.60	$28,900		
1961	Bushel-N-Peck	Bill Shoemaker	Mesh Tenney	Rex Ellsworth	1 mile	1:34.80	$21,800		
1960	Solid Thought	Donald Pierce	J. Lee Mosbacher	Mosbacher & Leach	1 mile	1:36.20	$22,850		
1959	Cellyar (GB)	Alex Maese	Charles A. Comiskey	Robert S. Le Sage	1 mile	1:36.60	$27,350		
1958	Foreverett	John Longden	Dale Landers	Helbush Farms	1 mile	1:37.60	$22,800		
1957	†Great Pride	Bill Shoemaker	James P. Conway	Ada L. Rice	1 mile	1:36.60	$21,650		Division 1
1957	Fanciful Miss	John Longden	Wally Dunn	Joseph W. Brown	1 mile	1:36.00	$21,650		Division 2
1956	Triple Jay	Alex Maese	Samuel Sechrest	Cardinal & Gold Ranch	1 mile	1:36.40	$22,700		
Sea Breeze Stakes
1955	Madam Jet	John Longden	John Craigmyle	Alberta Ranches Ltd.	1 mile	1:36.60	$22,650		
1954	Miz Clementine	Ismael Valenzuela	Horace A. Jones	Calumet Farm	7 furlongs	1:23.20	$22,150		
1953	Fleet Khal	John Burton	Mesh Tenney	Rex Ellsworth	7 furlongs	1:23.20	$24,150		
1952	Tonga	Gordon Glisson	Warren Stute	Yolo Stable	6 furlongs	1:09.40	$22,700		

Legend:
Turf Dirt
Notes:
† Ran as an entry
‡ In 1993, the race was run off the turf, but retained its GIII status.

== See also ==
List of American and Canadian Graded races
