= Santa Barbara Stakes =

Annual American horse race

- Class: Listed
- Location: Santa Anita Park; Arcadia, California, United States
- Inaugurated: 1935
- Race type: Thoroughbred – Flat racing
- Website: www.santaanita.com

Race information
- Distance: 1 1/2 miles (12 furlongs)
- Surface: Turf
- Track: Left-handed
- Qualification: Fillies & Mares, four-years-old & up
- Weight: Assigned
- Purse: US$150,000 (2014)

The Santa Barbara Stakes is an American Thoroughbred horse race run annually in mid April at Santa Anita Park in Arcadia, California. A Listed event open to fillies and mares, age four and older, it is contested of turf over a distance of one and a half miles.

Inaugurated in 1935, through 1941 it was a race for two-year-olds. In 1952 and again in 1954 it was restricted to three-year-old California-foaled fillies and in 1953 for three-year-old California foals of either sex. From 1955 through 1965, it was open to horses age three-year-olds and up and then since 1966 for fillies and mares age four and older.

The race was known as the Santa Barbara Juvenile Championship in 1937 and then as the Santa Barbara Stakes in 1935 and 1936, 1938, 1941, 1946 and 1952 through 1954. Since inception it has been contested at a variety of distances:

- 3 furlongs : 1935–1938, 1941
- 7 furlongs : 1946, 1952
- 6 furlongs : 1953, 1954
- about 6.5 furlongs on turf : 1958
- 8.5 furlongs (1 1/16 miles) : 1955–1957
- 9 furlongs (1 1/8 miles) : 2007
- 10 furlongs on turf: 1962–2006, 2008–2015
- 12 furlongs on turf: 2017–present

In 1958, the race was run at "about" distance. In 1973, 1977 and 1982, it was run on dirt. It was run in two divisions on three occasions: 1941, 1967, and 1968.

There was no race run in 1939, 1940, 1942 through 1945, 1947 through 1951, 1959 through 1961 and 2016.

This race was downgraded to a Grade III for its 2014 running and to a Listed event in 2023.

== Records ==
Speed record:

- 2:27.65 – Queen Blossom (at current distance of 1 1/2 miles on turf)
- 1:57.40 – Bequest (1991) (at distance of 1 1/4 miles on turf)

Most wins:

- 3 – Megahertz (2003, 2004, 2005)

Most wins by an owner:

- 3 – Alfred G. Vanderbilt II (1936, 1937, 1938)
- 3 – Michael Bello (2003, 2004, 2005)

Most wins by a jockey:

- 8 – Laffit Pincay Jr. (1968, 1971, 1973, 1974, 1978, 1980, 1982, 1993)

Most wins by a trainer:

- 7 – Charles Whittingham (1956, 1964, 1974, 1975, 1976, 1985, 1987)
- 6 – Robert J. Frankel (1994, 1995, 2003, 2004, 2005, 2007)

== Winners ==
Year	Winner	Age	Jockey	Trainer	style="Owner	Time
2019	Causeforcommotion	5	Geovanni Franco	J. Eric Kruljac	E. Dunham, J. Kruljac, Jim A. Reed, J. Sondereker, S. Yip, D. Yip	2:26.91
2018	Queen Blossom	5	Flavien Prat	Richard Baltas	Abbondanza Racing, LLC and Medallion Racing	2:27.65
2017	Evo Campo	5	Rafael Bejarano	Patrick Gallagher	David Day, Michael Day, Mary DiPietro	2:27.70
2016	no race					
2015	Queen of the Sand	5	Drayden Van Dyke	Patrick Gallagher	Derrick Fisher	2:01.04
2014	Stormy Lucy	5	Rafael Bejarano	Ed Moger Jr.	Steve Moger	1:58.73
2013	Lady of Shamrock	4	Rafael Bejarano	John W. Sadler	Hronis Racing LLC	2:00.91
2012	Capital Plan	4	Brice Blanc	Jerry Hollendorfer	Hollendorfer/Dedomenico	2:01.78
2011	Malibu Pier	4	Brice Blanc	Carla Gaines	Spendthrift Farm	2:00.22
2010	Tuscan Evening	5	Rafael Bejarano	Jerry Hollendorfer	William de Burgh	2:00.22
2009	Magical Fantasy	4	Alex Solis	Paddy Gallagher	Bienstock/Mandabach/Winner	1:59.83
2008	Foxysox	5	Victor Espinoza	Carla Gaines	Warren B. Williamson	2:00.45
2007	Naughty Rafaela	5	David R. Flores	Robert J. Frankel	Stud TNT	1:48.12
2006	Sharp Lisa	4	Corey Nakatani	Douglas F. O'Neill	J. Paul Reddam et al.	2:02.17
2005	Megahertz	6	Alex Solis	Robert J. Frankel	Michael Bello	1:59.76
2004	Megahertz	5	Alex Solis	Robert J. Frankel	Michael Bello	2:00.71
2003	Megahertz	4	Alex Solis	Robert J. Frankel	Michael Bello	2:00.08
2002	Astra	6	Kent Desormeaux	Laura de Seroux	Allen E. Paulson Trust	2:01.48
2001	Astra	5	Kent Desormeaux	Simon Bray	Allen E. Paulson Trust	2:01.33
2000	Caffe Latte	4	Corey Nakatani	Bob Baffert	Stonerside Stable	2:00.51
1999	Tranquility Lake	4	Ed Delahoussaye	Julio C. Canani	Pam & Martin Wygod	2:01.06
1998	Fiji	4	Kent Desormeaux	Neil D. Drysdale	The Thoroughbred Corp.	2:00.35
1997	Donna Viola	5	Gary Stevens	Ben D. A. Cecil	Gary A. Tanaka	1:59.85
1996	Auriette	4	Kent Desormeaux	Gary F. Jones	Barnes/Prestonwood Farm	2:02.00
1995	Wandesta	4	Corey Nakatani	Robert J. Frankel	Juddmonte Farms	2:01.77
1994	Possibly Perfect	4	Kent Desormeaux	Robert J. Frankel	Blue Vista, Inc.	2:00.56
1993	Exchange	5	Laffit Pincay Jr.	Bill Spawr	Sidney H. Craig	2:02.26
1992	Kostroma	6	Kent Desormeaux	Gary F. Jones	W. deBurgh et al.	1:59.63
1991	Bequest	5	Ed Delahoussaye	Neil D. Drysdale	Gerald W. Leigh	1:57.40
1990	Brown Bess	8	Jack Kaenel	Charles Jenda	Calbourne Farm	1:58.40
1989	No Review	4	Ed Delahoussaye	Christopher Speckert	Buckland Farm	2:02.60
1988	Pen Bal Lady	4	Ed Delahoussaye	Hector O. Palma	DeCarlo, et al.	1:59.60
1987	Reloy	4	Bill Shoemaker	Charles Whittingham	Nelson Bunker Hunt	2:00.00
1986	Mountain Bear	5	Chris McCarron	Darrell Vienna	Forgnone, et al.	2:01.00
1985	Fact Finder	6	Gary Stevens	Charles Whittingham	Nelson Bunker Hunt	2:01.60
1984	Comedy Act	5	Chris McCarron	Gary F. Jones	Elmendorf Farm	2:00.40
1983	Avigaition	4	Ed Delahoussaye	Vivian Pulliam	C. N. Pulliam	1:59.80
1982	Ack's Secret	6	Laffit Pincay Jr.	Michael Whittingham	Oak Cliff Stable	2:00.60
1981	The Very One	6	Jorge Velásquez	Stephen A. DiMauro	Helen Polinger	2:01.20
1980	Sisterhood	5	Laffit Pincay Jr.	Laz Barrera	Summa Stable	2:00.40
1979	Waya	5	Ángel Cordero Jr.	David A. Whiteley	Peter M. Brant	2:01.00
1978	Kittyluck	5	Laffit Pincay Jr.	Edwin J. Gregson	M/M Hastings Harcourt	2:00.60
1977	Desiree	4	Victor Centeno	Laz Barrera	Jacobs/Harbor View Farm	2:00.60
1976	Stravina	5	Bill Shoemaker	Charles Whittingham	Helen G. Stollery	1:59.60
1975	Gay Style	5	Bill Shoemaker	Charles Whittingham	John Sikura Jr.	2:01.40
1974	Tallahto	4	Laffit Pincay Jr.	Charles Whittingham	Mrs. Howard B. Keck	1:59.20
1973	Susan's Girl	4	Laffit Pincay Jr.	John W. Russell	Fred W. Hooper	2:03.60
1972	Hail the Grey	5	Earlie Fires	Willard L. Proctor	Glen Hill Farm	1:58.60
1971	Manta	5	Laffit Pincay Jr.	Farrell W. Jones	Elmendorf Farm	2:00.20
1970	Sallarina	4	William Mahorney	Charles Comiskey	L. E. Patterson	1:59.20
1969	Pink Pigeon	5	Donald Pierce	Paul K. Parker	Patrick Madden	1:58.20
1968	Amerigo's Fancy	6	Jerry Lambert	C. Ralph West	Edith & Desi Arnaz	2:02.40
1968	Princessnesian	4	Laffit Pincay Jr.	James W. Maloney	William Haggin Perry	2:00.80
1967	April Dawn	4	Bill Shoemaker	Harold C. McBride	Hemacinto-Billrick Stables	2:01.20
1967	Ormea	6	Ismael Valenzuela	Johnny Longden	Frank M. McMahon	2:00.60
1966	Straight Deal II	4	Bill Shoemaker	Hirsch Jacobs	Ethel D. Jacobs	1:58.80
1965	Batteur	5	Manuel Ycaza	James W. Maloney	William Haggin Perry	1:58.40
1964	Oil Royalty	6	Johnny Longden	Charles Whittingham	John R. Gaines	2:00.60
1963	Chicha	5	Manuel Ycaza	Horatio Luro	El Peco Ranch	2:02.60
1962	Cat Call	5	Braulio Baeza	J. W. Nicholson	M/M John Valpredo	2:03.00
1961	no race					
1960	no race					
1959	no race					
1958	Golden Notes	4	Henry Moreno	William J. Hirsch	King Ranch	1:13.60
1957	Pylades	4	Raul Sterling	B. Frank Christmas	Robert O. J. Streuber	1:41.00
1956	Porterhouse	5	Eddie Arcaro	Charles Whittingham	Llangollen Farm Stable	1:43.00
1955	Berseem	5	Johnny Longden	Reggie Cornell	Abe Hirschberg	1:42.00
1954	Frosty Dawn	3	Eddie Arcaro	Willie Alvarado	King & Brown	1:09.60
1953	De Anza	3	Ralph Neves	C. O'Connell	Springhill Stable	1:10.40
1952	Last Greetings	3	Eddie Arcaro	C. Ralph West	Clifford Mooers	1:24.60
1951	no race					
1950	no race					
1949	no race					
1948	no race					
1947	no race					
1946	Whirlabout	5	Ted Atkinson	Graceton Philpot	Louis B. Mayer	1:23.00
1945	no race					
1944	no race					
1943	no race					
1942	no race					
1941	Chiquita Mia	2	Leon Haas	Tom Smith	Charles S. Howard	0:33.80
1941	Black Raider	2	Lester Balaski	Roy Waldron	Milky Way Farm Stable	0:33.60
1940	no race					
1939	no race					
1938	Galley Slave	2	Raymond Workman	Bud Stotler	Alfred G. Vanderbilt II	0:34.40
1937	Balking	2	Lloyd Knapp	Bud Stotler	Alfred G. Vanderbilt II	0:33.20
1936	Airflame	2	John Bejshak	Bud Stotler	Alfred G. Vanderbilt II	0:33.80
1935	Billie Bane	2	Tommy Luther	T. D. Grimes	T. D. Grimes	0:34.60
