= Gamely Stakes =

- Class: Grade 1
- Location: Santa Anita Park; Arcadia, California, USA
- Inaugurated: 1939 as Long Beach Handicap at Hollywood Park Racetrack
- Race type: Thoroughbred - flat racing
- Website: Santa Anita Park

Race information
- Distance: 1 1/8 miles (9 furlongs)
- Surface: Turf
- Track: Left-handed
- Qualification: Fillies & mares, 3-years-old and older
- Weight: Base weights with allowances: 4-year-olds and up: 126 lbs. 3-year-olds: 118 lbs.
- Purse: $400,000 (2022)

The Gamely Stakes is a Grade I American Thoroughbred horse race for fillies and mares age three and older over a distance of 1 1/8 miles on the turf run in late May annually at Santa Anita Park, Arcadia, California.

== History ==
The race was inaugurated in 1939 as the Long Beach Handicap at Hollywood Park Racetrack in Inglewood, California over a distance of 1 mile. Then event was dormant until 1968 when it was run on the dirt for three-year-olds and older over a distance of 1 1/16 miles. The following year the race was conditioned for fillies and mares at the distance of 1 mile.

In 1973, the distance was set at the current route of 1 1/8 miles with a classification of Grade II.

The race was renamed for the 1976 running to honor the U.S. Racing Hall of Fame filly Gamely, who had died in 1975. It was run in two divisions in 1971 and again in 1978.

In 1983 the event was upgraded to Grade I.

Following the closure of Hollywood Park, the race moved to Santa Anita Park in 2014.

== Records ==
Speed record: (at current distance of 1 1/8 miles)

- 1:45.07 - Toussaud (1993)

Most wins:

- 2 - Tipping Time (1970, 1971)
- 2 - Astra (2000, 2002)

Most wins by a jockey:

- 7 - Kent Desormeaux (1993, 1995, 1996, 1998, 2000, 2002, 2018)

Most wins by a trainer:

- 8 - Robert J. Frankel (1990, 1992, 1993, 1995, 2001, 2003, 2007, 2008)

== Winners since 1989 ==
Year	Winner	Age	Jockey	Trainer	Owner	Time
Held at Santa Anita Park
2026	Thought Process	4	Hector Isaac Berrios	Philip D'Amato	Estate of Brereton C. Jones, Little Red Feather Racing and Madaket Stables	1:47.51
2025	Be Your Best (IRE)	5	Irad Ortiz, Jr.	Saffie Joseph, Jr.	Michael Ryan	1:46.26
2024	Anisette (GB)	4	Umberto Rispoli	Leonard Powell	Eclipse Thoroughbred Partners	1:46.90
2023	Macadamia (BRZ)	5	Tiago Pereira	Philip D'Amato	R Unicorn Stable	1:48.01
2022	Ocean Road (IRE)	4	Umberto Rispoli	Brendan Walsh	Qatar Racing	1:46.66
2021	Maxim Rate	4	Juan Hernandez	Simon Callaghan	Slam Dunk Racing, Stable Currency and James D. Branham	1:46.43
2020	Keeper Ofthe Stars	4	Abel Cedillo	Jonathon Wong	Tommy Town Thoroughbreds	1:46.43
2019	Vasilika	5	Flavien Prat	Jerry Hollendorfer	All Schlaich Stables, Jerry Hollendorfer, Gatto Racing & G. Todaro	1:48.07
2018	Sophie P	5	Kent J. Desormeaux	James M. Cassidy	D P Racing	1:48.53
2017	Lady Eli	5	Irad Ortiz, Jr.	Chad Brown	Sheep Pond Partners	1:45.29
2016	Illuminant	4	Flavien Prat	Michael W. McCarthy	Eclipse Thoroughbred	1:48.34
2015	Hard Not to Like	6	Victor Espinoza	Christophe Clement	Speedway Stable	1:49.87
2014	Miss Serendipity (ARG)	6	Brice Blanc	Ron McAnally	Anselmo E. Cavalieri	1:46.22
Held at Hollywood Park
2013	Marketing Mix	5	Gary Stevens	Thomas F. Proctor	Glen Hill Farm	1:47.24
2012	Belle Royale	4	Joel Rosario	Simon Callaghan	Michael B. Tabor	1:47.84
2011	Dubawi Heights	4	Joel Rosario	Simon Callaghan	Callaghan/McStay/Magnier/Wyatt	1:47.29
2010	Tuscan Evening	5	Rafael Bejarano	Jerry Hollendorfer	William Deburgh	1:47.30
2009	Magical Fantasy	4	Alex Solis	Paddy Gallagher	David Bienstock, et al.	1:48.18
2008	Precious Kitten	5	Rafael Bejarano	Robert J. Frankel	Lael Stables	1:45.23
2007	Citronnade	4	David Flores	Robert J. Frankel	Stronach Stables	1:45.73
2006	Shining Energy	4	Victor Espinoza	Julio C. Canani	J. T. Lanni / B. J. Schiappa	1:46.86
2005	Mea Domina	4	Tyler Baze	Ron McAnally	Janis R. Whitham	1:46.47
2004	Noches De Rosa	6	Mike E. Smith	Richard Mandella	Diamond A Racing	1:48.34
2003	Tates Creek	5	Pat Valenzuela	Robert J. Frankel	Juddmonte Farms	1:46.97
2002	Astra	6	Kent Desormeaux	Laura de Seroux	Allen E. Paulson Trust	1:46.93
2001	Happyanunoit	6	Brice Blanc	Robert J. Frankel	Amerman Racing Stables	1:47.34
2000	Astra	4	Kent Desormeaux	Simon Bray	Allen E. Paulson Trust	1:45.81
1999	Tranquility Lake	4	Ed Delahoussaye	Julio C. Canani	Pam & Martin Wygod	1:46.04
1998	Fiji	4	Kent Desormeaux	Neil D. Drysdale	The Thoroughbred Corp.	1:47.42
1997	Donna Viola	5	Gary Stevens	Ben D. A. Cecil	Gary A. Tanaka	1:47.40
1996	Auriette	4	Kent Desormeaux	Martin F. Jones	Prestonwood / Rick Barnes	1:46.59
1995	Possibly Perfect	5	Kent Desormeaux	Robert J. Frankel	Blue Vista, Inc.	1:46.99
1994	Hollywood Wildcat	4	Ed Delahoussaye	Neil D. Drysdale	Irving & Marjorie Cowan	1:46.55
1993	Toussaud	4	Kent Desormeaux	Robert J. Frankel	Juddmonte Farms	1:45.07
1992	Metamorphose	4	Gary Stevens	Robert J. Frankel	Serge Fradkoff	1:46.56
1991	Miss Josh	5	Laffit Pincay, Jr.	Barclay Tagg	Bonner Farm	1:47.50
1990	Double Wedge	5	Robbie Davis	Robert J. Frankel	Edmund A. Gann	1:47.80
1989	Fitzwilliam Place	5	Corey Black	Charlie Whittingham	Bruce McNall	1:47.80

== Earlier winners ==
- 1988 - Pen Bal Lady
- 1987 - Northern Aspen
- 1986 - La Koumia
- 1985 - Estrapade
- 1984 - Sabin
- 1983 - Pride of Rosewood
- 1982 - Ack's Secret
- 1981 - Kilijaro
- 1980 - Wishing Well
- 1979 - Sisterhood
- †1978 - Lucie Manet / Star Ball
- 1977 - Hail Hilarious
- 1976 - Katonka
- 1975 - Susan's Girl
- 1974 - Sister Fleet
- 1973 - Bird Boots
- 1972 - Typecast
- †1971 - Tipping Time / Manta
- 1970 - Tipping Time
- 1969 - Foggy Note
- 1968 - Rising Market
- 1939 - Flying Wild

Notes:
† Run in Divisions
