= Providencia Stakes =

- Class: Listed
- Location: Santa Anita Park; Arcadia, California, United States
- Inaugurated: 1981
- Race type: Thoroughbred – Flat racing
- Website: www.santaanita.com

Race information
- Distance: 1 1/8 miles
- Surface: Turf
- Track: Left-handed
- Qualification: Three-year-old fillies
- Weight: 124 lbs with allowances
- Purse: US$100,000 (since 2021)

The Providencia Stakes is a Listed American Thoroughbred horse race for three-year-old fillies over a distance of one and one-eighth miles on the turf course scheduled annually in April at Santa Anita Park. The event currently carries a purse of $100,000.

== History ==
Inaugurated in 1981, it has been run at 1 1/8 miles for most of its existence. It was run at 1 mile in 2004 and from 2006 to 2009.

In 2008, this race was upgraded from a Grade III to a Grade II, with its purse increased from $100,000 to $150,000. It has been downgraded to a Grade III again although its purse remains the same.

In 2025 the event was downgraded by the Thoroughbred Owners and Breeders Association to Listed status. The event was not held in 2025.

== Records ==
Speed record:

- 1 1/8 miles: 1:46.80 – Lady of Shamrock (2012)
- 1 mile: 1:34.20 – Acting Lady (2009)

Margins:

- 7 lengths - Artica (1995)

Most wins by a jockey:

- 4 – Laffit Pincay Jr. (1982, 1984, 1987, 1995)
- 4 – Alex Solis (1994, 1999, 2002, 2005)
- 4 – Kent J. Desormeaux (1996, 1994, 2004, 2016)
- 4 – Mike E. Smith (2003, 2012, 2017, 2022)

Most wins by a trainer:

- 4 – Gary F. Jones (1983, 1991, 1992, 1996)

Most wins by an owner:

- 2 – William R. Hawn (1985, 1990)
- 2 – Mary Jones Bradley (1986, 1993)
- 2 – Ellwood W. & Judy Johnston (1987, 1994)
- 2 – Jim Ford, Deron Pearson (2003, 2004)
- 2 – Warren B. Williamson (2006, 2014)

== Winners ==
Year	Winner	Jockey	Trainer	Owner	Distance	Time	Purse	Grade	Ref
2026	Lilo Lil	Emisael Jaramillo	Michael McCarthy	Charles Fox	1 1/8 miles	1:48.95	$101,500	Listed	
2025	Race not held								
2024	Medoro	Antonio Fresu	Peter Eurton	C R K Stable	1 1/8 miles	1:48.95	$100,500	III	
2023	Paris Secret (IRE)	Kazushi Kimura	Philip D'Amato	Strand Beach	1 1/8 miles	1:47.50	$100,000	III	
2022	Cairo Memories	Mike E. Smith	Robert Hess Jr.	David A. Bernsen & Schroeder Farms	1 1/8 miles	1:47.33	$100,500	III	
2021	Going Global (IRE)	Flavien Prat	Philip D'Amato	CYBT, Michael Dubb, Saul Gevertz, Michael Nentwig & Ray Pagano	1 1/8 miles	1:48.50	$101,000	III	
2020	Race not held								
2019	Hostess (GB)	Drayden Van Dyke	Simon Callaghan	John Warren Stable	1 1/8 miles	1:47.09	$151,755	III	
2018	Fatale Bere (FR)	Joel Rosario	Leonard Powell	Benowitz Family Trust, Head of Plains Partners, Mark Mathiesen & Mathilde Powell	1 1/8 miles	1:47.09	$151,035	III	
2017	Sircat Sally	Mike E. Smith	Jerry Hollendorfer	Joe L. Turner	1 1/8 miles	1:47.09	$150,345	III	
2016	Decked Out	Kent J. Desormeaux	J. Keith Desormeaux	Big Chief Racing & Gene A. Voss	1 1/8 miles	1:52.72	$151,380	III	
2015	Spirit of Xian (IRE)	Joseph Talamo	Richard E. Mandella	Ben Keswick	1 1/8 miles	1:48.10	$151,750	III	
2014	Nashoba's Gold	Joseph Talamo	Carla Gaines	Warren B. Williamson	1 1/8 miles	1:48.06	$151,250	III	
2013	Scarlet Strike	Rafael Bejarano	Jerry Hollendorfer	John Carver, Jerry Hollendorfer & Green Smith	1 1/8 miles	1:47.52	$151,250	III	
2012	Lady of Shamrock	Mike E. Smith	John W. Sadler	Hronis Racing	1 1/8 miles	1:46.80	$150,000	III	
2011	Cambina (IRE)	Garrett K. Gomez	Jeffrey L. Bonde	Anthony Bilich, Charles Cline, George Schmitt, Dennis Raihill, et al	1 1/8 miles	1:47.38	$150,000	II	
2010	City to City	Joel Rosario	Jerry Hollendorfer	William DeBurgh, Jerry Hollendorfer & Mark DeDomenico	1 1/8 miles	1:47.16	$150,000	II	
2009	Acting Lady	Victor Espinoza	Doug F. O'Neill	Andy Bell & Stephen Russell	1 mile	1:34.20	$150,000	II	
2008	Missit (IRE)	Victor Espinoza	Ben D. A. Cecil	Three Chimneys Racing	1 mile	1:34.91	$150,000	II	
2007	Super Freaky	Jon Court	Doug F. O'Neill	Suarez Racing & Alex Venneri	1 mile	1:35.59	$112,600	III	
2006	Foxysox (GB)	Alex Bisono	Carla Gaines	Warren B. Williamson	1 mile	1:34.88	$109,400	III	
2005	Berbatim	Alex O. Solis	Richard E. Mandella	Gary & Wendy Broad	1 1/8 miles	1:47.66	$111,600	III	
2004	Ticker Tape (GB)	Kent J. Desormeaux	James M. Cassidy	Jim Ford, Deron Pearson & Jack Sweesy	1 mile	1:34.55	$113,700	Listed	
2003	§ Star Vega (GB)	Mike E. Smith	James M. Cassidy	Jim Ford, Deron Pearson & John R. Cuchna	1 1/8 miles	1:47.89	$150,000	Listed	
2002	Megahertz (GB)	Alex O. Solis	Robert J. Frankel	Michael Bello	1 1/8 miles	1:47.34	$82,500		
2001	Dynamous	Victor Espinoza	Robert J. Frankel	Dr. John A. Chandler	1 1/8 miles	1:50.13	$81,975		
2000	Kumari Continent	David R. Flores	J. Paco Gonzalez	Trudy McCaffery & John Toffan	1 1/8 miles	1:48.97	$79,650		
1999	Sweet Life	Alex O. Solis	Neil D. Drysdale	Pam & Martin Wygod	1 1/8 miles	1:49.85	$80,625		
1998	Country Garden (GB)	Kent J. Desormeaux	Walter R. Greenman	Edward T. McGrath	1 1/8 miles	1:50.84	$81,750		
1997	§ Famous Digger	Brice Blanc	Barry Abrams	Let It Ride Stable, et al	1 1/8 miles	1:49.85	$75,000		
1996	Gastronomical	Kent J. Desormeaux	Gary F. Jones	G. Arthur Seelbinder	1 1/8 miles	1:50.40	$77,880		
1995	Artica	Laffit Pincay Jr.	Mike Harrington	Robert E. Resoff	1 1/8 miles	1:49.36	$80,475		
1994	Fancy 'n Fabulous	Alex O. Solis	Donald Warren	Ellwood W. & Judy Johnston & Marjorie Stonebraker	1 1/8 miles	1:49.02	$81,450		
1993	On the Catwalk (IRE)	Eddie Delahoussaye	Rodney Rash	Mary Jones Bradley	1 1/8 miles	1:50.35	$80,400		
1992	Miss Turkana	Antonio Lopez Castanon	Gary F. Jones	Saron Stable	1 1/8 miles	1:47.32	$81,225		
1991	Fantastic Ways	Chris McCarron	Gary F. Jones	Golden Eagle Farm	1 1/8 miles	1:49.40	$83,175		
1990	Materco	Eddie Delahoussaye	Mark MacDonald	William R. Hawn	1 1/8 miles	1:47.40	$82,650		
1989	Formidable Lady	Gary L. Stevens	Joseph Manzi	Fast Friends Stable, et al	1 1/8 miles	1:50.60	$83,100		
1988	Pattern Step	Chris McCarron	Charles E. Whittingham	Evergreen Farm	1 1/8 miles	1:48.00	$81,750		
1987	Some Sensation	Laffit Pincay Jr.	Donald Warren	Ellwood W. & Judy Johnston, Harold Meloth, et al	1 1/8 miles	1:48.20	$64,950		
1986	Miraculous	Gary L. Stevens	Charles E. Whittingham	Mary Jones Bradley	1 1/8 miles	1:47.80	$65,350		
1985	Soft Dawn	Bill Shoemaker	Willard L. Proctor	William R. Hawn	1 1/8 miles	1:49.60	$64,850		
1984	Class Play	Laffit Pincay Jr.	LeRoy Jolley	Peter M. Brant	1 1/8 miles	1:50.20	$64,850		
1983	Spruce Song	Sandy Hawley	Gary F. Jones	Elmendorf Farm	1 1/8 miles	1:47.40	$66,800		
1982	§ Phaedra	Laffit Pincay Jr.	Stephen A. DiMauro	Happy Valley Farm	1 1/8 miles	1:47.00	$66,800		
1981	Flying Baton	Terry Lipham	Terry Knight	Surf and Turf Stable	1 1/8 miles	1:47.60	$56,550		

Notes:
§ Ran as an entry

== See also ==
List of American and Canadian Graded races
