= Santa Ana Stakes =

Santa Ana Handicap
- Class: Grade III
- Location: Santa Anita Park; Arcadia, California, United States
- Inaugurated: 1968
- Race type: Thoroughbred – Flat racing
- Website: www.santaanita.com

Race information
- Distance: 1 1/4 miles (10 furlongs)
- Surface: Turf
- Track: Left-handed
- Qualification: Fillies & Mares, four-years-old & up
- Weight: Assigned
- Purse: US$100,000

The Santa Ana Handicap is a Thoroughbred horse race run at annually Santa Anita Park in Arcadia, California during the third week of March. The race is open to fillies and mares, age four and up, willing to race one and one-quarter miles on the turf.

A Grade III event, it currently offers a purse of $200,000.

In 1973 the race was run in two divisions. In 1981, 1982, 1983 and 1986, it was raced on dirt.

== Records ==
Speed record: (on turf)

- 1:59.24 – Elysea's World (2019)

Most wins:

- No horse has won this race more than once.

Most wins by an owner:

- 3 – Juddmonte Farms (1995, 2000, 2008)

Most wins by a jockey:

- 4 – Bill Shoemaker (1972, 1974, 1984, 1987)
- 4 – Kent Desormeaux (1991, 1994, 1998, 1999)

Most wins by a trainer:

- 8 – Robert J. Frankel (1992, 1994, 1995, 1999, 2000, 2005, 2007, 2008)

== Winners of the Santa Ana Handicap since 1968 ==
| Year | Winner | Age | Jockey | Trainer | Owner | Time |
|---|---|---|---|---|---|---|
| 2026 | Take a Breath (GB) | 4 | Emisael Jaramillo | Mark Glatt | Chivalry Thoroughbred Racing and Rancho Temescal Thoroughbred Partners | 2:02.06 |
| 2025 | Lady Claypoole (IRE) | 5 | Tiago Josue Pereira | Richard Baltas | Abbondanza Racing LLC and Omar Aldabbagh | 2:01.40 |
| 2024 | Linda's Gift | 5 | Tiago Josue Pereira | Richard E. Mandella | John Cronin, Anthony DiMarco, Michael A. Mandara, Fred Nicotra and Vincent Varvaro | 2:00.79 |
| 2023 | Ballet Dancing | 4 | Flavien Prat | Simon Callaghan | Westerberg, Mrs. John Magnier, Michael Tabor and Derrick Smith | 2:01.25 |
| 2022 | Queen Goddess | 4 | Victor Espinoza | Michael W. McCarthy | Eclipse Thoroughbred Partners & Tolo Thoroughbreds Inc | 1:59.72 |
| 2021 | Going To Vegas | 4 | Umberto Rispoli | Richard Baltas | Abbondanza Racing LLC, Medallion Racing & MyRacehorse | 2:00.80 |
| 2020 | Cancelled due to the COVID-19 pandemic. | | | | | |
| 2019 | Elysea's World (IRE) | 6 | Drayden Van Dyke | Richard Baltas | Abbondanza Racing LLC, Christopher T. Dunn, Jerry McClanahan | 1:59.24 |
| 2018 | Madam Dancealot (IRE) | 4 | Corey Nakatani | Richard Baltas | Slam Dunk Racing | 1:49.51 |
| 2017 | Goodyearforroses (IRE) | 5 | Corey Nakatani | Richard Baltas | Abbondanza Racing, LLC | 1:47.98 |
| 2016 | Tuttipaesi (IRE) | 6 | Christopher P. DeCarlo | William I. Mott | Valor Ladies | 1:48.82 |
| 2015 | Hoop of Colour | 4 | Drayden Van Dyke | H. Graham Motion | Flaxman Holdings | 1:49.08 |
| 2014 | Stormy Lucy | 5 | Rafael Bejarano | Frank Lucarelli | Erica Gaunt | 1:47.11 |
| 2013 | Tiz Flirtatious | 5 | Julien Leparoux | Martin F. Jones | Pamela C. Ziebarth | 1:46.62 |
| 2012 | Vamo a Galupiar | 5 | Mike E. Smith | Neil Drysdale | Robert S. Evans | 1:48.89 |
| 2011 | Malibu Pier | 4 | Rafael Bejarano | Carla Gaines | Spendthrift Farm | 1:48.05 |
| 2010 | Tuscan Evening | 5 | Rafael Bejarano | Jerry Hollendorfer | William de Burgh | 1:48.03 |
| 2009 | Belmont Cat | 5 | Joel Rosario | John W. Sadler | Doubledown Stables | 1:48.68 |
| 2008 | Costume | 4 | Garrett Gomez | Robert J. Frankel | Juddmonte Farms | 1:48.08 |
| 2007 | Citronnade | 4 | David Flores | Robert J. Frankel | Stronach Stables | 1:46.21 |
| 2006 | Silver Cup | 4 | Victor Espinoza | Patrick Biancone | Martin S. Schwartz | 1:48.13 |
| 2005 | Megahertz | 6 | Alex Solis | Robert J. Frankel | Michael Bello | 1:47.95 |
| 2004 | Katdogawn † | 4 | Mike E. Smith | James M. Cassidy | Jim Ford, Inc. | 1:47.36 |
| 2003 | Noches De Rosa | 5 | Mike E. Smith | Richard Mandella | Diamond A Racing | 1:48.31 |
| 2002 | Golden Apples | 4 | Garrett Gomez | Ben D. A. Cecil | Gary A. Tanaka | 1:47.05 |
| 2001 | Beautiful Noise | 5 | Chris McCarron | Ron McAnally | Janis R. Whitman | 1:47.27 |
| 2000 | Spanish Fern | 5 | Victor Espinoza | Robert J. Frankel | Juddmonte Farms | 1:49.30 |
| 1999 | See You Soon | 4 | Kent Desormeaux | Robert J. Frankel | Charles Kenis | 1:49.46 |
| 1998 | Fiji | 4 | Kent Desormeaux | Neil D. Drysdale | Thoroughbred Corp. | 1:49.85 |
| 1997 | Windsharp | 6 | Ed Delahoussaye | Wallace Dollase | Thoroughbred Corp. et al. | 1:49.47 |
| 1996 | Pharma | 5 | Chris McCarron | Ronald W. Ellis | Paulson & Wygod | 1:49.14 |
| 1995 | Wandesta | 4 | Corey Nakatani | Robert J. Frankel | Juddmonte Farms | 1:50.18 |
| 1994 | Possibly Perfect | 4 | Kent Desormeaux | Robert J. Frankel | Blue Vista, Inc. | 1:51.01 |
| 1993 | Exchange | 5 | Laffit Pincay Jr. | Bill Spawr | Sidney H. Craig | 1:46.23 |
| 1992 | Gravieres | 4 | Gary Stevens | Robert J. Frankel | Peter Wall | 1:47.75 |
| 1991 | Noble And Nice † | 5 | Kent Desormeaux | Julio C. Canani | Everest Stables | 1:46.60 |
| 1991 | Annual Reunion † | 4 | Gary Stevens | Gary F. Jones | Golden Eagle Farm | 1:46.60 |
| 1990 | Annoconnor | 6 | Corey Black | Richard Mettee | Fink & Gottlieb | 1:47.80 |
| 1989 | Maria Jesse | 4 | Gary Stevens | Julio C. Canani | David S. Milch | 1:47.20 |
| 1988 | Pen Bal Lady † | 4 | Ed Delahoussaye | Hector O. Palma | DeCarlo, et al. | 1:47.20 |
| 1987 | Reloy | 4 | Bill Shoemaker | Charles Whittingham | Nelson Bunker Hunt | 1:48.00 |
| 1986 | Videogenic | 4 | Robbie Davis | Gasper Moschera | Albert & Barbara Davis | 1:48.40 |
| 1985 | Estrapade | 5 | Fernando Toro | Charles Whittingham | Summa Stable (Lessee) | 1:47.00 |
| 1984 | Avigaition | 5 | Bill Shoemaker | Vivian Pulliam | C. Norman Pulliam | 1:48.40 |
| 1983 | Happy Bride | 5 | Chris McCarron | Laz Barrera | Dolly Green | 1:47.80 |
| 1982 | Track Robbery | 6 | Ed Delahoussaye | Robert L. Wheeler | Summa Stable | 1:47.20 |
| 1981 | Queen to Conquer | 5 | Laffit Pincay Jr. | Charles Whittingham | Wimborne Farm | 1:48.00 |
| 1980 | The Very One | 5 | Charlie Cooke | Jay M. Robbins | Helen Polinger | 1:48.40 |
| 1979 | Waya | 5 | Ángel Cordero Jr. | David A. Whiteley | Peter M. Brant | 1:48.20 |
| 1978 | Kittyluck | 5 | Fernando Toro | Edwin J. Gregson | M/M Hastings Harcourt | 1:53.00 |
| 1977 | Up To Juliet | 4 | Laffit Pincay Jr. | William Canney | Rowan & Whitney | 1:48.00 |
| 1976 | Sun Festival | 7 | Donald Pierce | Laz Barrera | Robert R. Dodderidge | 1:48.40 |
| 1975 | Move Abroad | 4 | Sandy Hawley | W. Preston King | Irwin Feiner | 1:51.40 |
| 1974 | Belle Marie | 4 | Bill Shoemaker | Charles Whittingham | Kinship Stables | 1:46.60 |
| 1973 | Bird Boots | 4 | Eddie Belmonte | Steve Ippolito | Jack R. Hogan | 1:47.00 |
| 1973 | Minstrel Miss | 6 | Donald Pierce | Gordon C. Campbell | Jack M. Grossman | 1:46.80 |
| 1972 | Street Dancer | 5 | Bill Shoemaker | John G. Canty | William T. Brady | 1:47.00 |
| 1971 | Mizzle | 5 | Jerry Lambert | William Canney | Rowan Brothers | 1:48.20 |
| 1970 | Boughs O'Holly | 5 | Jerry Lambert | Linwood J. Brooks | Mark Clemans Jr. | 1:47.20 |
| 1969 | Miss Ribot | 4 | Donald Pierce | Frank E. Childs | P. L. & C. T. Grissom | 1:48.60 |
| 1968 | Gabby Abby | 5 | Jerry Lambert | Buster Millerick | Glen Hill Farm | 1:47.60 |

- In 1988, Fitzwilliam Place finished first but was disqualified and set back to second.
- In 1991 there was a Dead heat for win.
- In 2004, Megahertz finished first but was disqualified and set back to last.
