= Apple Blossom Handicap =

- Class: Grade I
- Location: Oaklawn Park; Hot Springs, Arkansas
- Inaugurated: 1958 (as Apple Blossom Purse)
- Race type: Thoroughbred - Flat racing
- Website: www.oaklawn.com

Race information
- Distance: 1 1/16 miles
- Surface: Dirt
- Track: left-handed
- Qualification: Fillies & Mares, four-years-old and older
- Weight: Handicap
- Purse: $1,250,000 (2024)

The Apple Blossom Handicap is a Grade I American Thoroughbred horse race for fillies and mares that are four years old or older, run under handicap conditions over a distance of one and one-sixteenth miles on the dirt track held annually in April at Oaklawn Park in Hot Springs, Arkansas. The 2024 running carried a purse of $1,250,000.

== History ==
The race over the years has become the premier event for distaffers in the Spring, however its beginnings were inconsistent and were far from what we see today.

Nonetheless, the inaugural running was on 21 March 1958, as the Apple Blossom Purse, for horses three-years-old or older over the current distance and was won by the three year old colt Count De Blanc in a time of 1:43 2/5. The event at that time was a preparatory event for the Arkansas Derby because in his next start Count De Blanc duly proceeded to win that event. The current preparatory event for the Arkansas Derby is the Rebel Stakes but that event was not first run until 1962.

The event was not held again until 1963. Oaklawn Park acknowledges in their records that the event was won by Verna Lea Farm's four year old Submerge. Outside resources indicate that the event was held on 6 March 1963 as a claiming race for horses four years old or older over a distance of six furlongs. The event again was idle until 1968 when it was held as the Apple Blossom Purse for three year olds and older. The following year in 1969 the event was held as the Apple Blossom Handicap.

In 1973 the administration of Oaklawn Park modified the conditions of the event to allow only for fillies and mares that are four years old or older to start.

In 1975 the distance of the event was increased to one mile and seventy yards. That year the Champion Susan's Girl won the event in her only visit to the track in her 63 race career. The win would bring her career winnings to close to the record $1 million which would be first for a US filly or mare.

The American Graded Stakes Committee in 1977 upgraded the event to Grade III status and in quick succession upgraded it again to Grade II the following year.

In 1980 the distance of the event was increased slightly by 40 yards to one and one-sixteenth miles. The purse for the event had risen substantially to over $200,000 by 1981 and with the best female competitors entering the event the status of the race had been set at Grade I.

The list of champions who had won the event in the 20th century was impressive, includes: Susan's Girl, Canadian champion Northernette, Track Robbery, North Sider, Argentine bred Bayakoa, Paseana from Argentina who won the event twice and was third as an eight-year-old in 1995 to the 1994 US Three-Year-Old Champion filly Heavenly Prize, Escena and Banshee Breeze.

In the 2000s Allen E. Paulson's Champion mare Azeri won the event for a record three times becoming the US Horse of the Year of 2002, and the US Champion Older Female Horse three years running: 2002, 2003, and 2004. In her honor Oaklawn Park in 2005 renamed the Oaklawn Breeders' Cup Stakes to the Azeri Stakes.

The champion mare Zenyatta won the event twice (2008, 2010) during her phenomenal nineteen race winning streak. In 2010 Oaklawn Park president Charles J. Cella was negotiating with the owners of the two top females in U.S. racing in 2009, Rachel Alexandra and Zenyatta to have a purse of $5 million if both horses were to start. However, the day after a loss by Rachel Alexandra in the New Orleans Ladies at the Fair Grounds her connections announced that she would not run in the Apple Blossom.

The 2019 winner Midnight Bisou continued winning four more events before finishing second in the Breeders' Cup Distaff at Santa Anita Park. Nonetheless, her record during the year was strong enough to have her crowned US Champion Older Female Horse for the year.

The prize money of the event was scheduled to increase from $750,000 to $1,000,000 in 2020 but was reduced to $600,000 due to the COVID-19 pandemic in the United States reducing fan attendance. In 2021, the purse was increased to $1,000,000 to attract champions Monomoy Girl and Swiss Skydiver.

== Records ==
Speed record:

- 1 1/16 miles – 1:40.20 Heatherten (1984) (New race and track record)
- 1 mile and 70 yards – 1:40.60 Summertime Promise (1976)

Margins:

- 6 1/2 lengths – By Land by Sea (1988)

Most wins:

- 3 – Azeri (2002, 2003, 2004)

Most wins by a jockey:

- 7 – Mike E. Smith (1994, 2002, 2003, 2004, 2008, 2010, 2019)

Most wins by a trainer:

- 4 – William I. Mott (1984, 1985, 1998, 2014)

Most wins by an owner:

- 4 – Allen E. Paulson (1998, 2002, 2003, 2004)

== Winners ==
Year	Winner	Age	Jockey	Trainer	Owner	Distance	Time	Purse	Grade	Ref
Apple Blossom Handicap
2026	Claret Beret	5	Micah J. Husbands	Saffie A. Joseph Jr.	Miller Racing, LLC	1 1/16 miles	1:42.21	$1,250,000	I	
2025	Thorpedo Anna	4	Brian Hernandez Jr.	Kenneth G. McPeek	Nader Alaali, Mark Edwards, Judy Hicks & Magdalena Racing	1 1/16 miles	1:44.27	$1,250,000	I	
2024	Adare Manor	5	Juan J, Hernandez	Bob Baffert	Michael Lund Petersen	1 1/16 miles	1:42.48	$1,250,000	I	
2023	Clairiere	5	Joel Rosario	Steven M. Asmussen	Stonestreet Stables	1 1/16 miles	1:43.36	$1,000,000	I	
2022	Letruska	6	José Ortiz	Fausto Gutierrez	St George Stables	1 1/16 miles	1:42.22	$980,000	I	
2021	Letruska	5	Irad Ortiz Jr.	Fausto Gutierrez	St George Stables	1 1/16 miles	1:43.14	$1,000,000	I	
2020	Ce Ce	4	Victor Espinoza	Michael W. McCarthy	Bo Hirsch	1 1/16 miles	1:43.14	$600,000	I	
2019	Midnight Bisou	4	Mike E. Smith	Steven M. Asmussen	Bloom Racing Stable, Madaket Stables & Allen Racing	1 1/16 miles	1:43.88	$750,000	I	
2018	Unbridled Mo	5	Ricardo Santana Jr.	Todd A. Pletcher	Red Oak Stable	1 1/16 miles	1:43.94	$700,000	I	
2017	Stellar Wind	5	Victor Espinoza	John W. Sadler	Hronis Racing	1 1/16 miles	1:42.75	$600,000	I	
2016	Forever Unbridled	4	John R. Velazquez	Dallas Stewart	Charles E. Fipke	1 1/16 miles	1:43.08	$600,000	I	
2015	Untapable	4	John R. Velazquez	Steven M. Asmussen	Winchell Thoroughbreds	1 1/16 miles	1:42.96	$600,000	I	
2014	Close Hatches	4	Joel Rosario	William I. Mott	Juddmonte Farms	1 1/16 miles	1:42.75	$588,000	I	
2013	On Fire Baby	4	Joe M. Johnson	Gary G. Hartlage	Anita Cauley	1 1/16 miles	1:44.13	$500,000	I	
2012	Plum Pretty	4	Rafael Bejarano	Bob Baffert	Peachtree Stable	1 1/16 miles	1:42.64	$490,000	I	
2011	Havre de Grace	4	Ramon A. Dominguez	J. Larry Jones	Fox Hill Farms	1 1/16 miles	1:42.19	$490,000	I	
2010	Zenyatta	6	Mike E. Smith	John Shirreffs	Jerry & Ann Moss	1 1/8 miles	1:50.71	$490,000	I	
2009	Seventh Street	4	Rajiv Maragh	Kiaran P. McLaughlin	Darley Stable	1 1/16 miles	1:43.13	$490,000	I	
2008	Zenyatta	4	Mike E. Smith	John Shirreffs	Jerry & Ann Moss	1 1/16 miles	1:42.64	$500,000	I	
2007	Ermine	4	Eddie Castro	Ronny W. Werner	Oxbow Racing	1 1/16 miles	1:44.02	$500,000	I	
2006	Spun Sugar	4	Michael J. Luzzi	Todd A. Pletcher	Stronach Stables	1 1/16 miles	1:42.59	$500,000	I	
2005	Dream of Summer	6	Pat Valenzuela	Juan J. Garcia	James Weigel	1 1/16 miles	1:43.86	$500,000	I	
2004	Azeri	6	Mike E. Smith	D. Wayne Lukas	Allen E. Paulson	1 1/16 miles	1:41.20	$500,000	I	
2003	Azeri	5	Mike E. Smith	Laura de Seroux	Allen E. Paulson	1 1/16 miles	1:43.00	$500,000	I	
2002	Azeri	4	Mike E. Smith	Laura de Seroux	Allen E. Paulson	1 1/16 miles	1:42.75	$500,000	I	
2001	§ Gourmet Girl	6	Calvin H. Borel	Alcides Pico Perdomo	Gary A. Tanaka	1 1/16 miles	1:42.15	$500,000	I	
2000	Heritage of Gold	5	Shane Sellers	Thomas M. Amoss	Jack Garey	1 1/16 miles	1:42.22	$500,000	I	
1999	Banshee Breeze	4	Jerry D. Bailey	Carl A. Nafzger	Jayeff B. Stable & James B.Tafel	1 1/16 miles	1:41.64	$500,000	I	
1998	Escena	5	Jerry D. Bailey	William I. Mott	Allen E. Paulson	1 1/16 miles	1:40.95	$500,000	I	
1997	§ Halo America	7	Calvin H. Borel	Bobby C. Barnett	John A. Franks	1 1/16 miles	1:41.60	$500,000	I	
1996	Twice the Vice	5	Chris McCarron	Ronald W. Ellis	Martin & Pam Wygod	1 1/16 miles	1:41.60	$500,000	I	
1995	Heavenly Prize	4	Pat Day	Claude R. McGaughey III	Ogden Phipps	1 1/16 miles	1:42.60	$500,000	I	
1994	Nine Keys	4	Mike E. Smith	Angel A. Penna Jr.	Lazy F Ranch	1 1/16 miles	1:42.00	$500,000	I	
1993	Paseana (ARG)	6	Chris McCarron	Ron McAnally	Sidney H. Craig	1 1/16 miles	1:41.80	$500,000	I	
1992	Paseana (ARG)	5	Chris McCarron	Ron McAnally	Sidney H. Craig	1 1/16 miles	1:42.00	$500,000	I	
1991	Degenerate Gal	6	Pat Day	Burk Kessinger Jr.	Ronald W. McDonald	1 1/16 miles	1:41.20	$500,000	II	
1990	Gorgeous	4	Eddie Delahoussaye	Neil D. Drysdale	Robert N. Clay	1 1/16 miles	1:40.40	$350,000	II	
1989	Bayakoa (ARG)	5	Laffit Pincay Jr.	Ron McAnally	Janis & Frank Whitham	1 1/16 miles	1:41.60	$250,000	I	
1988	By Land by Sea	4	Fernando Toro	Gary F. Jones	Gary F. Jones & Jayeff B. Stable	1 1/16 miles	1:41.20	$250,000	I	
1987	§ North Sider	5	Angel Cordero Jr.	D. Wayne Lukas	Paul Paternostro & D. Wayne Lukas	1 1/16 miles	1:41.20	$270,500	I	
1986	Love Smitten	5	Chris McCarron	Edwin J. Gregson	Gail & Del Chase	1 1/16 miles	1:40.40	$270,300	I	
1985	Sefa's Beauty	6	Pat Day	William I. Mott	Farid Sefa	1 1/16 miles	1:42.20	$269,500	I	
1984	Heatherten	5	Sam Maple	William I. Mott	John A. Franks	1 1/16 miles	1:40.20	$279,000	I	
1983	Miss Huntington	6	Jorge Velasquez	D. Wayne Lukas	Eugene V. Klein	1 1/16 miles	1:44.80	$287,700	I	
1982	Track Robbery	6	Eddie Delahoussaye	Robert L. Wheeler	Summa Stable	1 1/16 miles	1:45.20	$268,400	I	
1981	Bold 'n Determined	4	Eddie Delahoussaye	Neil D. Drysdale	Saron Stable	1 1/16 miles	1:44.20	$219,700	II	
1980	Billy Jane	4	John Lively	Mitch Shirota	Albert A. Savill	1 1/16 miles	1:43.60	$177,150	II	
1979	Miss Baja	4	Eddie Maple	Joseph B. Cantey	Lockhart Spears	1 mile & 70 yards	1:43.00	$178,000	II	
1978	Northernette (CAN)	4	Don Brumfield	Claude R. McGaughey III	Peter M. Brant	1 mile & 70 yards	1:42.00	$123,550	II	
1977	Hail Hilarious	4	Donald Pierce	Neil D. Drysdale	Saron Stable	1 mile & 70 yards	1:41.40	$137,150	III	
1976	Summertime Promise	4	Darrel G. McHargue	Jack Van Berg	Kenneth Opstein	1 mile & 70 yards	1:40.60	$59,600		
1975	Susan's Girl	6	James D. Nichols	James L. Newman	Fred W. Hooper	1 mile & 70 yards	1:42.40	$61,200		
1974	Big Dare	4	Bobby Ussery	Joseph P. Dorignac III	Joseph P. Dorignac Jr.	6 furlongs	1:11.80	$31,750		
1973	Levee Night	5	Danny Gargan	Roy T. Gillem	John T. Shouse	6 furlongs	1:11.00	$20,000		
1972	Plenty Old	5	Robert. L. Baird	Dewey P. Smith	Audley Farms	6 furlongs	1:09.60	$20,000		
1971	Sir Realist	5	Harlon Dalton	Olen Battles	Mrs. Herman Udouj	6 furlongs	1:10.20	$20,000		
1970	♯§ Zuke's Bad Boy	4	Robert Mundorf	Robert L. Irwin	Marion Van Berg Stable	6 furlongs	1:11.00	$15,000		
1969	Jay Roam	4	Larry Snyder	Robert L. Irwin	Marion Van Berg Stable	6 furlongs	1:10.20	$12,500		
Apple Blossom Purse
1968	†Roman K	4	Hector Viera	Jean O. Brennan	Dr. Keith Knapp	6 furlongs	1:10.80	$10,000		3YO+
1964–1967		Race not held								
1963	Submerge	4	Danny Weiler	Arthur W. Beuzeville	Verna Lea Farm	6 furlongs	1:15.20	$2,400		‡4YO+
1959–1962		Race not held								
1958	Count De Blanc	3	Johnny Sellers	Charles C. Norman	Charles W. & Jake H. Riedinger	1 mile & 70 yards	1:43.40	$2,600		3YO+

Legend:
Fillies and mares
Open company
Notes:
§ Ran as an entry
† In the 1968 running Big Tim won the race but was disqualified to second after stewards ruled she had bumped and interfered with Roman K.
♯ In the 1970 running American Victory was first past the post but was disqualified by the stewards for interference on the fourth-place finisher Roaring Thunder after his jockey Louis Cacioppo lodged a complaint against Larry Snyder. Marion Van Berg's entry of Zuke's Bad Boy and Roaring Thunder was declared the winner and Royal Cap was moved to second. American Victory was moved to fourth.
‡ Claiming event

== See also ==
- List of American and Canadian Graded races
