= Rodeo Drive Stakes =

- Class: Grade I
- Location: Santa Anita Park; Arcadia, California
- Inaugurated: 1977
- Race type: Thoroughbred – Flat racing
- Website: www.santaanita.com

Race information
- Distance: 1 1/4 miles (2,000 meters)
- Surface: Turf
- Track: Left-handed
- Qualification: Fillies & Mares, Three-years-old & Up
- Weight: Scale Weight
- Purse: $300,000

The Rodeo Drive Stakes is a Grade I race for thoroughbred fillies and mares aged three-years-old and upwards. It is run at Santa Anita Park with a current purse of $300,000 and is contested over a distance of 1 1/4 miles (2,000 meters).

Originally named the Yellow Ribbon Stakes, it was normally raced during the Oak Tree Racing Association meeting at Santa Anita Park in late September / early October. It was and is a major prep race for the Breeders' Cup Filly & Mare Turf raced over a distance of 1 1/4 miles (2,000 meters) on the turf.

Part of the Breeders' Cup Challenge series, the winner of the Rodeo Drive automatically qualifies for the Breeders' Cup Filly & Mare Turf.

Inaugurated in 1977, it was an Invitational through 1995. The original name for the race was the idea of Oak Tree Founding Director Louis R. Rowan and is taken from the wartime song: "Tie a Yellow Ribbon 'Round the Old Oak Tree."

== Records ==
Time record:

- 1:57.60 – Brown Bess (1989)

Most wins:

- 2 – Wait A While (2006, 2008)
- 2 – Avenge (2016, 2017)
- 2 – Going To Vegas (2021, 2022)

Most wins by an owner:

- 6 – Juddmonte Farms (1992, 1997, 1999, 2003, 2004, 2014)

Most wins by a jockey:

- 4 – Kent Desormeaux (1991, 1992, 1994, 1998)

Most wins by a trainer:

- 5 – Robert J. Frankel (1993, 1999, 2003, 2004, 2005)

== Winners ==
=== Rodeo Drive Stakes ===
Year	Winner	Age	Jockey	Trainer	Owner	Time
2026	Thought Process	4	Hector Isacc Berrios	Philip D'Amato	Estate of Brereton C. Jones, Little Red Feather Racing and Madaket Stables	1:58.47
2025	Mission of Joy	5	Umberto Rispoli	Philip D'Amato	RyZan Sun Racing LLC and Madaket Stables LLC	2:00.03
2024	Hang the Moon	4	Kazushi Kimura	Philip D'Amato	CJ Thoroughbreds	1:58.58
2023	Didia (ARG)	5	Vincent Cheminaud	Ignacio Correas IV	Merribelle Stable LLC	1:59.79
2022	Going to Vegas	5	Umberto Rispoli	Phil D'Amato	Abbondanza Racing LLC, Medallion Racing, MyRacehorse	1:59.41
2021	Going to Vegas	4	Umberto Rispoli	Richard Baltas	Abbondanza Racing LLC, Medallion Racing, MyRacehorse	1:58.84
2020	Mucho Unusual	4	Juan Hernandez	Tim Yakteen	George Krikorian	2:00.19
2019	Mirth	4	Mike Smith	Philip D'Amato	Little Red Feather Racing	1:58.47
2018	Vasilika	4	Flavien Prat	Jerry Hollendorfer	All Schlaich Stables LLC, Hollendorfer, LLC, Gatto Racing, LLC, G. Todaro	1:59.04
2017	Avenge	5	Flavien Prat	Richard Mandella	Ramona S. Bass	1:58.74
2016	Avenge	4	Flavien Prat	Richard Mandella	Perry Bass	1:58.52
2015	Photo Call	4	Drayden Van Dyke	H. Graham Motion	Juliet Cooper	2:00.76
2014	Emollient	6	Rosie Napravnik	William I. Mott	Juddmonte Farms	2:00.22
2013	Tiz Flirtatious	5	Julien Leparoux	Martin F. Jones	Pamela C. Ziebarth	1:58.98
Yellow Ribbon Stakes
2012	Marketing Mix	4	Garrett K. Gomez	Thomas F. Proctor	Glen Hill Farm	1:59.20
2011	Dubawi Heights	4	Joel Rosario	Simon Callaghan	Neville Callaghan, Clodagh McStay, M. V. Magnier	2:00.52
2010‡	Hibaayeb	3	Rafael Bejarano	Saeed bin Suroor	Godolphin Racing	2:00.44
2009	Magical Fantasy	4	Alex Solis	Paddy Gallagher	David Bienstock, Paul Mandabach, Charles Winner	1:59.59
2008	Wait A While	5	John Velazquez	Todd Pletcher	Arindel Farm (Alan & Karen Cohen)	1:59.16
2007	Nashoba's Key	4	Joseph Talamo	Carla Gaines	Warren B. Williamson	1:59.73
2006	Wait A While	3	Garrett Gomez	Todd Pletcher	Arindel Farm (Alan & Karen Cohen)	1:59.25
2005	Megahertz	6	Alex Solis	Robert Frankel	Michael Bello	2:00.50
2004	Light Jig	4	René R. Douglas	Robert Frankel	Juddmonte Farms	1:59.28
2003	Tates Creek	5	Pat Valenzuela	Robert Frankel	Juddmonte Farms	2:00.77
2002	Golden Apples	4	Pat Valenzuela	Ben D. A. Cecil	Gary Tanaka	1:59.72
2001	Janet	4	David R. Flores	Darrell Vienna	Stonerside Stable	1:58.64
2000	Tranquility Lake	5	Ed Delahoussaye	Julio C. Canani	Martin & Pam Wygod	2:02.98
1999	Spanish Fern	4	Chris McCarron	Robert Frankel	Juddmonte Farms	1:59.52
1998	Fiji	4	Kent Desormeaux	Neil Drysdale	Prince Fahd bin Salman	2:05.23
1997	Ryafan	3	Alex Solis	John Gosden	Juddmonte Farms	2:03.60
1996	Donna Viola	4	Gary Stevens	Chris Wall	Kieran D. Scott	2:00.62
1995	Alpride	4	Chris McCarron	Ron McAnally	Sid & Jenny Craig	2:01.68
1994	Aube Indienne	4	Kent Desormeaux	Charles Whittingham	Frankfurt Stables (Lewis Figone)	2:02.32
1993	Possibly Perfect	3	Corey Nakatani	Robert Frankel	Blue Vista Inc.	2:02.91
1992	Super Staff	4	Kent Desormeaux	Ron McAnally	Juddmonte Farms	1:59.20
1991	Kostroma	5	Kent Desormeaux	Gary F. Jones	Robert Sangster et al.	2:01.00
1990	Plenty of Grace	3	Herb McCauley	John M. Veitch	Darby Dan Farm	1:58.40
1989	Brown Bess	7	Jack Kaenel	Charles J. Jenda	Calbourne Farm (Suzanne Pashayan)	1:57.60
1988	Delighter	3	Chris McCarron	Jonathan Pease	Evergreen Farm	2:02.40
1987	Carotene	4	José A. Santos	Roger Attfield	Kinghaven Farms	2:03.80
1986	Bonne Ile	5	Fernando Toro	John Gosden	Arthur M. Budgett (Lessee)	2:01.60
1985	Estrapade	5	Bill Shoemaker	Charles Whittingham	Summa Stable (Lessee)	2:00.40
1984	Sabin	4	Eddie Maple	Woody Stephens	Henryk de Kwiatkowski	2:00.00
1983	Sangue	5	Bill Shoemaker	Henry M. Moreno	R. Charlene Parks	2:02.20
1982†	Castilla	3	Ray Sibille	Charles Whittingham	Mary Jones Bradley	1:58.60
1981	Queen to Conquer	5	Marco Castaneda	Charles Whittingham	Wimborne Farm (Diane Perkins)	1:58.60
1980	Kilijaro	4	Alain Lequeux	Olivier Douieb	Serge Fradkoff	1:59.20
1979	Country Queen	4	Laffit Pincay Jr.	Randy Winick	Maribel G. Blum, George Sarant, Arnold N. Winick	2:00.20
1978	Amazer	3	Bill Shoemaker	Maurice Zilber	Nelson Bunker Hunt	1:59.20
1977	Star Ball	5	Howard Grant	Jaime Villagomez	John Valpredo & Donald Valpredo	2:02.60

† In 1982, Avigaition finished first but was disqualified and placed second.
‡ In 2010 run at Hollywood Park.
