= Laura de Seroux =

Personal information
- Born: February 9, 1952 (age 74) Los Angeles, California
- Occupation: Trainer

Horse racing career
- Sport: Horse racing
- Career wins: 84

Major racing wins
- Affirmed Handicap (2001); Beverly Hills Handicap (2002); Del Mar Oaks (2002); Gamely Breeders' Cup Handicap (2002); Lady's Secret Breeders' Cup Handicap (2002); La Habra Stakes (2002); San Clemente Handicap (2002); Santa Barbara Handicap (2002); Santa Margarita Invitational Handicap (2002); Pucker Up Stakes (2002, 2005); Apple Blossom Handicap (2002, 2003); Clement L. Hirsch Handicap (2002, 2003); Milady Handicap Breeders' Cup Handicap (2002, 2003); Vanity Invitational Handicap (2002, 2003); Cinema Handicap (2003); Stars and Stripes Turf Handicap (2003, 2004); Mervyn Leroy Handicap (2003); Wilshire Handicap (2003); Arlington Classic (2004); Hollywood Gold Cup (2004); Native Diver Handicap (2005); Pucker Up Stakes (2005); Las Madrinas Handicap (2006) Breeders' Cup wins: Breeders' Cup Distaff (2002)

Significant horses
- Azeri, Astra, Dublino, Ballingarry, Total Impact

Laura M. de Seroux (born February 9, 1952, in Los Angeles, California) is a retired trainer of Thoroughbred racehorses. In 2002, she became the second female to win a Breeders' Cup race and the only female to train an American Horse of the Year.

== Early career ==
Born Laura M. Lubisich, in 1986 she married Emmanuel de Seroux, a bloodstock agent she met while on business in France. She learned race conditioning of Thoroughbreds from Hall of Fame trainer Charlie Whittingham for whom she exercised horses for sixteen years. She then began managing parts of the racing operations for owners Nelson Bunker Hunt and Bruce McNall in both North America and Europe. On Laura de Seroux's advice, in September 1987 McNall purchased a half interest in Trempolino. Five days later Trempolino won the Prix de l'Arc de Triomphe, smashing the race record time for Europe's most prestigious race by 1.4 seconds. Laura de Seroux also was instrumental in McNall's purchase of Saumarez who gave him his second "Arc" win in 1990.

== Training career ==
Laura de Seroux took out a trainer's license in 1999 using San Luis Rey Downs in Bonsall, California, as a base. Her break came in August 2001 when she was given eight horses to condition for the estate of Allen Paulson who had been one of racing's successful owners and breeders. Among the eight horses was the racemare Astra, who in 2002 would win two Grade 1 races and a Grade 2 under the race conditioning of Laura de Seroux. However, the star of the stable was Azeri who won eight of her nine starts in 2002, capping it off with a 5-length win in the Breeders' Cup Distaff. The de Seroux stable's earnings in 2002 of $3,894,906 broke the record for most earnings by a female trainer set by Jenine Sahadi in 1996.

The Irish three-year-old horse Ballingarry from the Coolmore Stud was purchased by Sidney L. Port in October 2002. He was turned over to Laura de Seroux to handle the colt's training in the United States. Ballingarry won back-to-back editions of the Stars and Stripes Turf Handicap in 2003 and 2004.

In 2004 Laura de Seroux entered her first starter in the prestigious Hollywood Gold Cup and won it when Hall of Fame jockey Mike Smith rode Total Impact, owned by a Saudi royal, Sultan bin Mohammed, to victory.

After a short but brilliant training career, Laura de Seroux retired at the end of March, 2007.
