= Estrapade (horse) =

American-bred Thoroughbred racehorse

- Sire: Vaguely Noble
- Grandsire: Vienna
- Dam: Klepto
- Damsire: No Robbery
- Sex: Mare
- Foaled: 1980
- Country: United States
- Colour: Bay
- Breeder: Nelson Bunker Hunt
- Owner: 1) Bruce McNall (France); 2) Allen E. Paulson (USA)
- Trainer: 1) Maurice Zilber (France); 2) Charlie Whittingham (USA)
- Record: 30: 12-5-5
- Earnings: US$1,937,142

Major wins
- Prix de Tourelles (1983); La Coupe de Maisons-Laffitte (1984); Prix de la Pepiniere (1984); Las Palmas Handicap (1985); Santa Ana Handicap (1985); Yellow Ribbon Stakes (1985); Gamely Handicap (1985); Arlington Million (1986); Beverly Hills Handicap (1986); Oak Tree Invitational Stakes (1986)

Awards
- American Champion Female Turf Horse (1986)

Estrapade (1980–2005) was an American-bred Champion Thoroughbred racehorse. Bred in Kentucky by Nelson Bunker Hunt, she raced at age three and four in France for Bruce McNall where her most important win came in the 1984 La Coupe de Maisons-Laffitte. Shipped to the United States in October 1984 she raced once that year at Santa Anita Park, finishing third in the Yellow Ribbon Stakes, a Grade I race she would win the next year.

Allen Paulson purchased Estrapade for $4.5-million at the November 1985 Keeneland breeding stock sale. She won three of her ten starts for her new owner, capturing the Beverly Hills Handicap and beating colts in both the Oak Tree Invitational Stakes and Arlington Million. As of 2008, Estrapade remains the only female to have ever won the Arlington Million. In her next to last career start, she ran third to winner Manila in the 1986 Breeders' Cup Turf. She was voted the 1986 Eclipse Award as American Champion Female Turf Horse.

Retired to broodmare duty, Estrapade produced two winners from six starters, including stakes race winner, Rice. Estrapade developed Cushing's syndrome and was pensioned from the Hill 'n' Dale Farms breeding operation in Lexington, Kentucky. She was scheduled to be sent to Old Friends Equine in Georgetown, Kentucky, but on February 25, 2005, died of a heart attack. She is buried at the Old Friends Cemetery on Alfred Nuckols, Jr.'s Hurstland Farm with a plaque that outlines her accomplishments.

In 2006, Estrapade was nominated for induction in the National Museum of Racing and Hall of Fame.
