= Malibu Pier (horse) =

American-bred Thoroughbred racehorse

- Sire: Malibu Moon
- Dam: Blue Moon
- Damsire: Lomitas
- Sex: Filly
- Foaled: April 2, 2007
- Country: United States
- Colour: Chestnut
- Breeder: B. Wayne Hughes
- Owner: Spendthrift Farm LLC
- Trainer: Carla Gaines
- Record: 11: 6–1–1
- Earnings: $ 288,000

Major wins
- Santa Ana Stakes (2011); Santa Barbara Handicap (2011); Beverly Hills Handicap (2011)

Malibu Pier (foaled April 2, 2007, in Kentucky) is a former American Thoroughbred racehorse and current broodmare. Owned by Spendthrift Farm LLC and trained by Carla Gaines, she won the Santa Ana Stakes, the Santa Barbara Handicap and the Beverly Hills Handicap.

She was sired by Malibu Moon. She is out of Blue Moon. After retiring from racing, Malibu Pier became a broodmare.

== 2010 season ==
On July 15, 2010, Malibu Pier won her first race, a 6 furlongs maiden race. She was ridden by Rafael Bejarano. She raced on turf and she defeated 5 other horses.

On August 14, 2010, Malibu Pier won her second race 1 mile Allowance Optional Claiming race with Rafael Bejarano. This time she defeated bigger field, with 8 other fillies.

In the field of 10 other fillies Malibu Pier finished in 4th place in Harold C. Ramser Sr. Handicap on October 17, 2010.

Malibu Pier came back with 1 1/16 miles on all weather track win in Allowance race. She meet the small field and finished the race in 1:43:44.

On December 26, 2010, Malibu Pier finished 2nd to Switch in the 7 furlongs Grade 1 race La Brea Stakes. She was ridden by Garrett Gomez.

== 2011 season ==
On January 26, 2011, Malibu Pier finished last in an El Encino Stakes with 5 fillies in the field. Her jockey was Garrett Gomez.

Malibu Pier came back on turf, when she finished 3rd in Buena Vista Handicap on February 21, 2011, to Cozi Rosie.

March 19, 2011, was a day when Malibu Pier come back with a win in the Grade 2 Santa Ana Stakes, where she defeated fillies and mares going 1 1/8 miles on turf with Rafael Bejarano.

On April 16, 2011, Malibu Pier won the 1 1/4 miles long Santa Barbara Handicap defeating Cozi Rosie and other fillies and mares.

On May 30, 2011, Malibu Pier finished 5th as a favourite Grade 1 Gamely Stakes, going 1 1/8 miles on turf. She was ridden by Brice Blanc .

On June 26, 2011, Malibu Pier returned impressively with her Grade 3 Beverly Hills Handicap win. She won over Cozi Rosie and 2 other fillies.

== Career statistics ==
| Finish | Jockey | Race | 1st | 2nd | 3rd | Time |
|---|---|---|---|---|---|---|
| 1st | B. Blanc | Beverly Hills Handicap | Malibu Pier | Cozi Rosie | Restless Soul | 2:01:01 |
| 5th | B. Blanc | Gamely Stakes | Dubawi Heights | Celtic Princess | Cozi Rosie | 1:47:29 |
| 1st | B. Blanc | Santa Barbara Handicap | Malibu Pier | Cozi Rosie | Restless Soul | 2:00:02 |
| 1st | R. Bejarano | Santa Ana Stakes | Malibu Pier | Turning Top | Lilly Fa Pootz | 1:48:05 |
| 3rd | R. Bejarano | Buena Vista Handicap | Cozi Rosie | Briecat | Malibu Pier | 1:35.94 |
| 2nd | G. Gomez | La Brea Stakes | Switch | Malibu Pier | Shotgun Gulch | 1:20:33 |
| 1st | R. Bejarano | Allowance | Malibu Pier | Calle Vista | Hemera | 1:43:44 |
| 4th | R. Bejarano | Harold C. Ramser Sr. H. | Go Forth North | All Due Respect | Antares World | 1:34:48 |
| 1st | R. Bejarano | Allowance | Malibu Pier | Hemera | Hard Way Ten | 1:35:27 |
| 1st | R. Bejarano | MSW | Malibu Pier | Come Home Lady | Onenightin Beijing | 1:09:87 |

== Pedigree ==
Pedigree of Malibu Pier (USA), Chestnut filly, 2007
| Sire Malibu Moon 1997 | A.P. Indy; 1989 | Seattle Slew | Bold Reasoning |
| Sire Malibu Moon 1997 | A.P. Indy; 1989 | Seattle Slew | My Charmer |
| Sire Malibu Moon 1997 | A.P. Indy; 1989 | Weekend Surprise | Secretariat |
| Sire Malibu Moon 1997 | A.P. Indy; 1989 | Weekend Surprise | Lassie Dear |
| Sire Malibu Moon 1997 | Macoumba; 1992 | Mr. Prospector | Raise a Native |
| Sire Malibu Moon 1997 | Macoumba; 1992 | Mr. Prospector | Gold Digger |
| Sire Malibu Moon 1997 | Macoumba; 1992 | Maximova | Green Dancer |
| Sire Malibu Moon 1997 | Macoumba; 1992 | Maximova | Baracala |
| Dam Blue Moon 1997 | Lomitas; 1988 | Niniski | Nijinsky |
| Dam Blue Moon 1997 | Lomitas; 1988 | Niniski | Virginia Hills |
| Dam Blue Moon 1997 | Lomitas; 1988 | La Colorada | Surumu |
| Dam Blue Moon 1997 | Lomitas; 1988 | La Colorada | La Dorada |
| Dam Blue Moon 1997 | To The Rainbow; 1991 | Rainbow Quest | Blushing Groom |
| Dam Blue Moon 1997 | To The Rainbow; 1991 | Rainbow Quest | I Will Follow |
| Dam Blue Moon 1997 | To The Rainbow; 1991 | Trelex | Exbury |
| Dam Blue Moon 1997 | To The Rainbow; 1991 | Trelex | Dentrelic |
