= Megahertz (horse) =

British-bred Thoroughbred racehorse

- Sire: Pivotal
- Grandsire: Polar Falcon
- Dam: Heavenly Ray
- Damsire: Rahy
- Sex: Mare
- Foaled: 1999
- Country: Great Britain
- Colour: Chestnut
- Breeder: Cheveley Park Stud Ltd.
- Owner: Michael Bello
- Trainer: Robert J. Frankel
- Record: 34: 14-6-5
- Earnings: US$2,261,594

Major wins
- Blue Norther Stakes (2002); Some Sensation Stakes (2002); Providencia Stakes (2002); Honeymoon Breeders' Cup Handicap (2002); American Oaks (2002); Santa Barbara Handicap (2003, 2004, 2005); John C. Mabee Handicap (2003); San Gorgonio Handicap (2004); Beverly Hills Handicap (2005); Santa Ana Handicap (2005); Yellow Ribbon Stakes (2005)

Honours
- Grade III Megahertz Stakes
- Last updated on 6 May 2020

Megahertz (foaled May 4, 1999 in Great Britain) is a Thoroughbred racehorse who raced in France and the United States.

Raced at age two, Megahertz made eight starts, compiling a record of 1-1-2. Her only win came in the Prix Hotel du Golf Barriere at the Deauville-La Touques Racecourse. Owned by trainer Robert Collet, after her first two starts Megahertz was sold to a racing partnership and her training was taken over by Nicolas Clement. At the end of the year she was sold to American Michael Bello who brought her to the California stable of Bobby Frankel.

Megahertz made her first start in the United States on January 9, 2002, winning the Blue Norther Stakes at Santa Anita Park. She did it in what would become her trademark style, coming from the back of the field to win in the homestretch. She went on to win another four stakes that year including the American Oaks. As a four-year-old, Megahertz won the Santa Barbara Handicap and her first Grade I event, the John C. Mabee Handicap. Back on the track at age five in 2004, she won the San Gorgonio Handicap and her second Santa Barbara Handicap. In her final year of racing at age six, Megahertz won the Beverly Hills and Santa Ana Handicaps, plus a record third straight Santa Barbara Handicap. From 2003 through 2005, Megahertz competed in the Breeders' Cup Filly & Mare Turf, earning her best finish in 2004 when she finished fifth to winner, Ouija Board.

Retired from racing, Megahertz was bred to Giant's Causeway and produced a colt named Causeithertz on February 18, 2007. At the November 2007 Keeneland Sales, owner Michael Bello sold Megahertz in foal to Bernardini for $2.1 million to Roy and Gretchen Jackson's Lael Stable. On February 29, 2008 she gave birth to a filly.
