= Track Robbery =

American-bred Thoroughbred racehorse

- Sire: No Robbery
- Grandsire: Swaps
- Dam: Left at Home
- Damsire: Run for Nurse
- Sex: Filly
- Foaled: 1976
- Country: United States
- Colour: Chestnut
- Breeder: Edgar Kitchen
- Owner: Summa Stable
- Trainer: Robert L. Wheeler; John W. Russell
- Record: 59: 22-12-7
- Earnings: $1,098,357

Major wins
- Beverly Hills Handicap (1981); Vanity Handicap (1981); Santa Ana Handicap (1982); Apple Blossom Handicap (1982); Spinster Stakes (1982)

Awards
- American Champion Older Female Horse (1982)

Track Robbery (foaled 1976 in Kentucky) was an American Thoroughbred Champion racehorse. Out of the mare Left at Home, she was sired by Wood Memorial Stakes winner No Robbery, a son of U.S. Racing Hall of Fame inductee Swaps.

Raced by Los Angeles Kings owner Bruce McNall under the Summa Stable banner, Track Robbery was trained by Robert Wheeler in all but one of her career starts, with John W. Russell her winning trainer in the 1982 Spinster Stakes. In 1982, the filly won three Grade I races en route to being voted American Champion Older Female Horse honors.

Retired to broodmare duty, Track Robbery's most successful runner was the multiple stakes winner Train Robbery.
