= Astra (horse) =

American-bred Thoroughbred racehorse

- Sire: Theatrical
- Grandsire: Nureyev
- Dam: Savannah Slew
- Damsire: Seattle Slew
- Sex: Mare
- Foaled: 1996
- Country: United States
- Colour: Bay
- Breeder: Allen E. Paulson
- Owner: Allen E. Paulson
- Trainer: 1) Simon Bray; 2) Laura de Seroux
- Record: 16: 11-1-2
- Earnings: US$1,378,424

Major wins
- Matiara Stakes (1999); Gamely Breeders' Cup Handicap (2000, 2002); Jenny Wiley Stakes (2000); Beverly Hills Handicap (2001, 2002); Santa Barbara Handicap (2001, 2002)

Astra (foaled January 25, 1996, in Kentucky) was an American Thoroughbred racemare who won four Grade I races on turf.

== Background ==
She was bred and raced by Allen Paulson who also owned and raced her dam and her sire. Her dam was Savannah Slew, a daughter of the 1977 U.S. Triple Crown champion Seattle Slew, and her sire was Theatrical, winner of the 1987 Breeders' Cup Turf.

== Racing career ==
Following the death of Allen Paulson on July 19, 2000, Astra raced for the Allen E. Paulson Living Trust. In mid-2001, trainer Simon Bray retired and her race conditioning was then turned over to Laura de Seroux who went on to match the two Grade I and the single Grade II wins that Bray had had with Astra. In winning her second edition of the Beverly Hills Handicap in 2002 for de Seroux, Astra set a new stakes record of 1:58.56 - for a mile and a quarter on turf.

== Broodmare ==
Astra was boarded at Ashford Stud near Versailles, Kentucky. She produced three foals, all of which raced but with only limited success, before her untimely death on June 12, 2007, at Hagyard Equine Medical Institute near Lexington as a result of complications from colic.

== Pedigree ==
Pedigree of Astra
Sire Theatrical	Nureyev	Northern Dancer	Nearctic
Sire Theatrical	Nureyev	Northern Dancer	Natalma
Sire Theatrical	Nureyev	Special	Forli
Sire Theatrical	Nureyev	Special	Thong
Sire Theatrical	Tree of Knowledge	Sassafras	Sheshoon
Sire Theatrical	Tree of Knowledge	Sassafras	Ruta
Sire Theatrical	Tree of Knowledge	Sensibility	Hail To Reason
Sire Theatrical	Tree of Knowledge	Sensibility	Pange
Dam Savannah Slew	Seattle Slew	Bold Reasoning	Boldnesian
Dam Savannah Slew	Seattle Slew	Bold Reasoning	Reason To Earn
Dam Savannah Slew	Seattle Slew	My Charmer	Poker
Dam Savannah Slew	Seattle Slew	My Charmer	Fair Charmer
Dam Savannah Slew	Pilferer	No Robbery	Swaps
Dam Savannah Slew	Pilferer	No Robbery	Bimlette
Dam Savannah Slew	Pilferer	Will Hail	Hail To Reason
Dam Savannah Slew	Pilferer	Will Hail	Sabana
