= John Russell (horse trainer) =

American horse trainer and writer

John W. Russell
Personal information
- Born: May 19, 1936 Lincolnshire, England
- Died: February 25, 2004 (aged 67) San Diego County, California
- Occupations: Horse trainer; sportswriter; novelist

Horse racing career
- Sport: Horse racing
- Career wins: 812

Major racing wins
- Duchess Stakes (1967); Woodbine Oaks (1969); Signature Stakes (1971, 1973); Villager Stakes (1971); Acorn Stakes (1972); Beldame Stakes (1972); Cotillion Handicap (1972); Gazelle Handicap (1972); Kentucky Oaks (1972); La Troienne Stakes (1972); Monrovia Stakes (1972); Pasadena Stakes (1972); Santa Susana Stakes (1972); Santa Ynez Stakes (1972); Arlington-Washington Lassie Stakes (1973); Delaware Handicap (1973); Hollywood Lassie Stakes (1973); Santa Barbara Handicap (1973); Santa Margarita Invitational Handicap (1973); Santa Maria Handicap (1973); Susquehanna Handicap (1973); Matron Stakes (1974); Bernard Baruch Handicap (1975, 1976, 1977); Gotham Stakes (1975); Hialeah Turf Cup Handicap (1975); Hollywood Derby (1975); Jersey Derby (1975); Peter Pan Stakes (1975); Secretariat Stakes (1975); Amory L. Haskell Handicap (1976); Astoria Stakes (1976); Cavalcade Handicap (1976); Cinema Handicap (1976); Go For Wand Handicap (1976); New York Stakes (1976); Personal Ensign Stakes (1976); Round Table Handicap (1976); Sorority Stakes (1976); Swaps Stakes (1976); United Nations Stakes (1976); Arlington Handicap (1977); Boiling Springs Stakes (1977); Man o' War Stakes (1977); Monmouth Handicap (1977); Sword Dancer Handicap (1977); Washington Park Handicap (1977); Manhattan Handicap (1978); Fall Highweight Handicap (1979); Frank E. Kilroe Mile Handicap (1980); Del Mar Oaks (1981); La Brea Stakes (1981); Spinster Stakes (1982); San Gabriel Handicap (1983, 1987); Cabrillo Handicap (1988); Del Mar Mile Handicap (1988)

Significant horses
- Majestic Light, Susan's Girl, Track Robbery, Precisionist, Tri Jet, Effervescing

John W. Russell (May 19, 1936 - February 25, 2004) was an American trainer of Thoroughbred racehorses, a freelance sportswriter and the author of the 2002 novel In the Shadow of Dark Horses. Among his clients, he trained for the nationally prominent stables of Ogden Phipps, Fred W. Hooper and Bud Willmot's Kinghaven Farms. He is best known for training Precisionist, Track Robbery and three-time Champion and U.S. Racing Hall of Fame inductee, Susan's Girl.
