= Brice Blanc =

French jockey

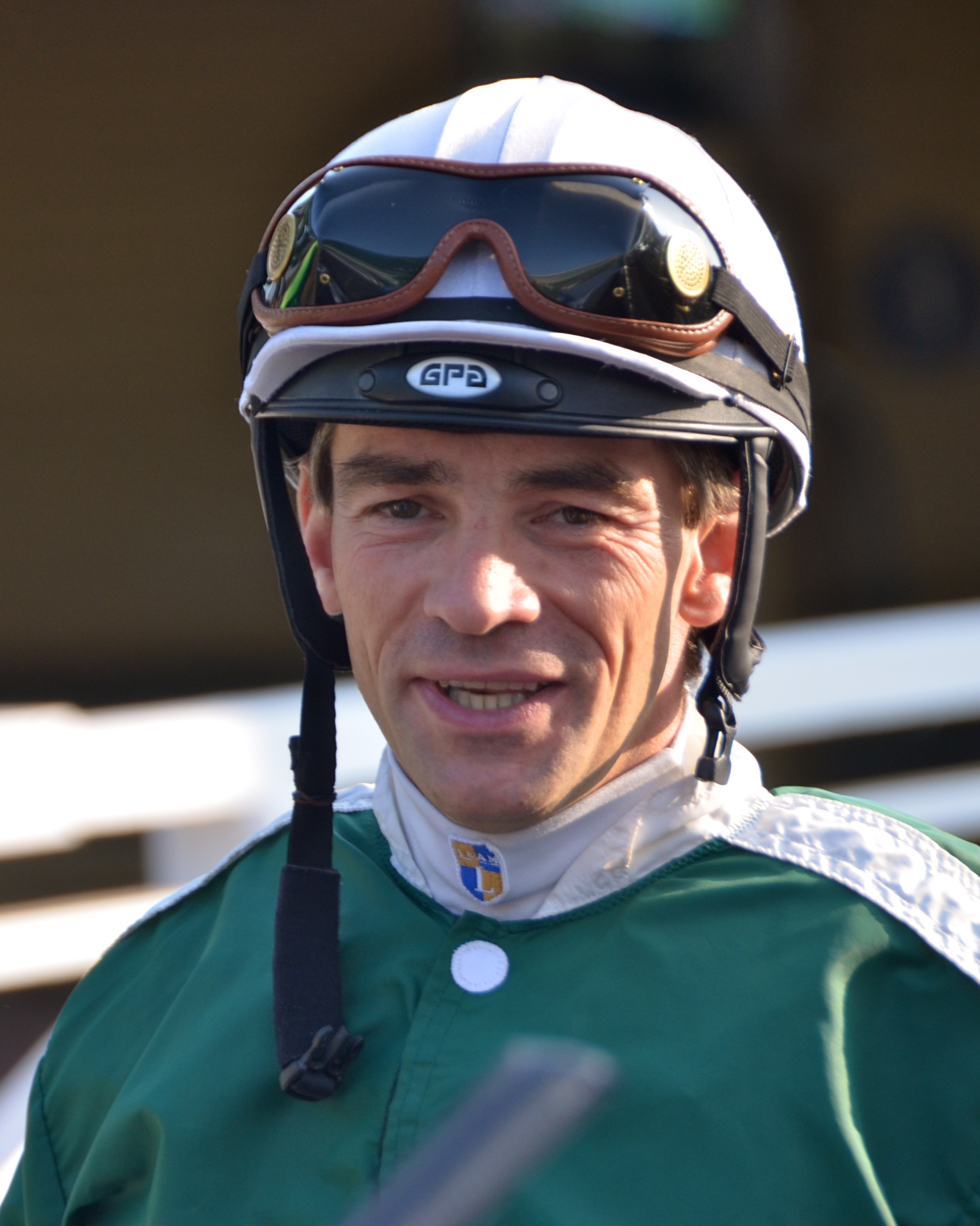

Personal information
- Born: January 16, 1973 (age 53) Lyon, France
- Occupation: Jockey

Horse racing career
- Sport: Horse racing
- Career wins: ongoing

Major racing wins
- Las Palmas Handicap (1995); Del Mar Oaks (1997); San Clemente Handicap (1997); Providencia Stakes (1997); San Francisco Mile (1997, 1999); San Luis Obispo Handicap (1997); San Pasqual Handicap (1998); First Lady Stakes (1999); Matriarch Stakes (1999); Morvich Handicap (1999); Arcadia Handicap (2000); Beverly Hills Handicap (2000); Buena Vista Handicap (2000, 2002); Ramona Handicap (2000); Nearctic Stakes (2000); Gamely Breeders' Cup Handicap (2001); Lady's Secret Breeders' Cup Handicap (2001); Sunset Handicap (2002); Fair Grounds Handicap (2001); La Habra Stakes (2002); San Juan Capistrano Invitational Handicap (2003); Arlington Handicap (2004); Churchill Distaff Turf Mile Stakes (2004); Edgewood Stakes (2005); Gulfstream Park Handicap (2005); Indiana Derby (2005); Opening Verse Handicap (2005); Stars and Stripes Turf Handicap (2005); Commonwealth Turf Stakes (2006); Lane's End Stakes (2006); Daytona Handicap (2007); Del Mar Debutante Stakes (2007); San Marcos Handicap (2007); Eatontown Handicap (2007); Honeymoon Handicap (2015)

Significant horses
- Happyanunoit, Famous Digger

Brice Blanc (born January 16, 1973) is a French jockey currently competing in American thoroughbred horse racing.

Blanc attended a jockey's apprentice school in his native France then, encouraged by trainer Ben Cecil, in October 1993 emigrated to the United States where he settled in Southern California and began racing at area tracks. He competed primarily at Del Mar Racetrack, Hollywood Park Racetrack and Santa Anita Park but also won races at various other North American racetracks including Arlington Park in Chicago, Gulfstream Park in Florida, and Woodbine Racetrack in Toronto, Ontario, Canada.

After spending close to ten years racing in California, he relocated to Kentucky where he raced until 2006 when he returned to California.

In the 11,189 starts in his career as of 2022, he won 1,053 races, and placed second and third 1,160 and 1,327 times, respectively.

Chart (2000–present)	Peak position
National Earnings List for Jockeys 2000	56
National Earnings List for Jockeys 2004	56
National Earnings List for Jockeys 2005	60
National Earnings List for Jockeys 2007	74
