= Robert J. Frankel =

American horse trainer (1941–2009)

Robert Frankel

Personal information
- Born: July 9, 1941 Brooklyn, New York, U.S.
- Died: November 16, 2009 (aged 68); Pacific Palisades, California, U.S.
- Occupation: Trainer
- Spouses: Bernadette Birk (m. 1970; div. 1974) Bonita Boniface (m. 2003; div. 2006)
- Children: Bethenny Frankel

Horse racing career
- Sport: Horse racing
- Career wins: 3,654

Major racing wins
- San Gorgonio Handicap (1973, 1996, 1997, 1999, 2001, 2003, 2004, 2007); Charles Whittingham Memorial Handicap (1973, 1979, 1991, 1992, 1999, 2002, 2009); Eddie Read Handicap (1977, 1981, 1982, 1986, 1989, 1992, 1997); Vanity Invitational Handicap (1984); John C. Mabee Handicap (1990, 1995, 1998, 2003, 2007); Santa Anita Handicap (1990, 2002, 2003); Arlington Handicap (1991, 1994, 1996, 2000); Clement L. Hirsch Turf Championship Stakes (1991, 1999, 2000, 2001); Hollywood Gold Cup (1991, 2001, 2008); Hollywood Derby (1991, 1999, 2001); Pacific Classic Stakes (1992, 1993, 1994, 1995, 2000, 2001); Santa Ana Handicap (1992, 1994, 1995, 1999, 2000, 2005, 2007, 2008); Woodward Stakes (1993, 2001, 2003, 2004); Yellow Ribbon Stakes (1993, 1999, 2003, 2004, 2005); Santa Barbara Handicap (1994, 1995, 2003, 2004, 2005, 2007); Frank E. Kilroe Mile Handicap (1996, 2002, 2005); Laurance Armour Handicap (1996); Matriarch Stakes (1996, 1997, 1999, 2001, 2003, 2004, 2006, 2007); Arlington Million (2000, 2002); Jockey Club Gold Cup (2001); Whitney Handicap (2001, 2003); Travers Stakes (2002); Diana Stakes (2001, 2002); Santa Anita Oaks (2002, 2008, 2009); Coaching Club American Oaks (2003); Forego Handicap (2003, 2004, 2005, 2008); Wood Memorial Stakes (2003); Florida Derby (2003); Haskell Invitational Handicap (2003); Louisiana Derby (2003, 2005) American Classics / Breeders' Cup wins: Belmont Stakes (2003); Breeders' Cup Sprint (2001); Breeders' Cup Filly & Mare Turf (2002, 2005); Breeders' Cup Classic (2004) Breeders' Cup Distaff (2007) International wins: Japan Cup (1988); E. P. Taylor Stakes (2004); Queen's Plate (2005)

Racing awards
- Eclipse Award for Outstanding Trainer (1993, 2000, 2001, 2002, 2003) U.S. Champion Trainer by earnings (1993, 2002, 2003)

Honours
- National Museum of Racing and Hall of Fame (1995); Robert J. Frankel Memorial Handicap at Santa Anita Park

Significant horses
- Squirtle Squirt, Bertrando, Empire Maker, Exbourne, Peace Rules, Milwaukee Brew, Starine, Beat Hollow, Medaglia d'Oro, Sightseek, Ghostzapper, Leroidesanimaux, Ginger Punch, Megahertz, Stardom Bound, Ventura

Robert Julian Frankel (July 9, 1941 – November 16, 2009) was an American thoroughbred race horse trainer whom ESPN called "one of the most successful and respected trainers in the history of thoroughbred racing." He was inducted into the National Museum of Racing and Hall of Fame in 1995, and was a five-time winner of the Eclipse Award for Outstanding Trainer. Often referred to as "Bobby" by others, he preferred and always used "Robert". Frankel set the single-season world record for most Grade/Group I victories in 2003 with 25 Grade I wins, a record that stood until it was beaten by Aidan O'Brien in 2017.

== Early life and education ==
Frankel was born July 9, 1941, to a German-Jewish family in Brooklyn, the son of Merrill and Gertrude Frankel. His parents were in the catering business. His interest in horses was piqued when his parents took him to Belmont Park as a child. After high school, he enrolled at C.W. Post College on Long Island but soon quit after getting into a fight. Thereafter, he worked construction by day and gambled at the tracks by night, eventually volunteering as a hot walker so he could get a free pass to the evening races.

== Career ==
Early in his career in 1960s New York City, Frankel assisted the prominent trainer Buddy Jacobson. On his own, Frankel saddled his first winner late in 1966 before struggling somewhat in 1967, when he won with just 9 of 101 starters. During 1968 however, he won 36 of 165 outings with his horses accumulating $167,000 in purse money. In the next few years, he continued to prosper in New York and during the winter of 1970–71, he enjoyed some success at the West Coast meeting at Santa Anita.

After moving permanently to California in 1972, Frankel scored a series of wins that brought him to the attention of the horse-betting world, winning a record 60 races at Hollywood Park. Many of those victories came with runners he acquired as low-cost claimers for one of his owners like Edmund Gann, with whom he had a 30-year working relationship. These horses typically showed dramatic improvement under his care, sometimes winning their next start against higher-priced claiming levels.

Frankel was an avid follower of the training techniques of Charlie Whittingham, trainer of champions such as Ferdinand and Sunday Silence. Frankel won several Eclipse Awards, the year-end thoroughbred racing awards, for best trainer. He set earnings records, Grade I stakes victory records, and many others. Frankel also won the Pacific Classic Stakes a record six times, including four times in a row, also a record.

Some of his best race horses include: Squirtle Squirt, his first Breeders' Cup winner; Skimming, two-time winner of the Grade 1 Pacific Classic Stakes; Sightseek, winner of the Humana Distaff Handicap (Gr. I) and Ogden Phipps Handicap (Gr. I); triple Grade I winner Empire Maker, winner of the Belmont Stakes (Gr. I); multiple Grade I winning Peace Rules; two-time Santa Anita Handicap (Gr. I) winner Milwaukee Brew; Breeders' Cup Filly & Mare Turf (Gr. I) winner Starine, whom he also owned; and Ghostzapper, the Breeders' Cup Classic (Gr. I) winner who was voted the 2004 Eclipse Award for Horse of the Year.

Frankel was the U.S. Champion Trainer by earnings in 2002 and 2003.

On June 26, 2005, Wild Desert, owned by several businesspeople including former New York Yankees manager Joe Torre, gave Frankel his first victory in the $1 million Queen's Plate, the first leg of the Canadian Triple Crown at Woodbine Racetrack.

== Personal life and death ==
Frankel was married twice.

His first wife was Bernadette Birk (1950–2024) Birk was a Roman Catholic of Welsh descent who converted to Judaism when they married. In 1970 they had one daughter, Bethenny Frankel, who later went on to become a reality television personality and businesswoman. They divorced after four years of marriage, and Bernadette married horse trainer John Parisella. Parisella and Frankel were originally friends as well as competitors.

In 2003, he married Bonita Boniface. They divorced in 2006.

Frankel died at his home in Pacific Palisades, California on November 16, 2009, at the age of 68, after being diagnosed with leukemia. Estranged from his daughter and once good friend (and step-father to Bethenny) Parisella, he reconciled with both before his death. He is interred at Hillside Memorial Park in Culver City, California.

== Legacy ==
On November 1, 2014, Bobby's Kitten, named after the late Hall of Fame trainer, captured the Breeders' Cup Turf Sprint at Santa Anita Park. Bobby's Kitten is owned and bred by Kenneth and Sarah Ramsey, who were clients of Frankel. The colt is trained by Chad Brown, who was Frankel's New York assistant.

In 2010, the San Gorgonio Handicap - a race Frankel won eight times - was renamed the Robert J. Frankel Memorial Handicap in his honor.

In 2008 a colt from Juddmonte Stud was named Frankel in honour of the trainer. The colt, by Galileo and out of Kind, was trained in Newmarket (England) by Sir Henry Cecil, won all of his 14 starts, and received the highest rating ever awarded by the British publication Timeform. After his 14th win in October 2012, it was announced Frankel was to be retired to stud.

In 2004, he was inducted into the Southern California Jewish Sports Hall of Fame.
