= Carla Gaines =

American race horse trainer

- Born: 1952 or 1953 (age 73–74); Mountain Brook, Alabama, U.S.
- Education: University of Alabama; University of Alabama at Birmingham
- Occupation: Thoroughbred racehorse trainer

Carla Gaines (born 1952 or 1953) is a California-based American thoroughbred racehorse trainer. Since earning her trainer's license in 1989, Gaines's horses have won nearly $39 million in earnings over the course of her career. In 2015 became the 16th woman trainer to take a horse to the Kentucky Derby, where she ran Bolo to a twelfth-place finish.

== Biography ==
Gaines was born and raised in Mountain Brook, Alabama. Gaines rode horses on her grandfather's farm and later competed in hunter-jumper classes. She attended the University of Alabama where she received an undergraduate degree in psychology and sociology, and later pursued a master's degree in counseling at the University of Alabama at Birmingham. As a youth, she competed horses and got into racing after working as an exercise rider. Prior to becoming a race trainer, Gaines counseled troubled youth. Gaines turned to horses after her early forays into counselling negatively affected her mental health.

In the mid-1980s she moved to Northern California to pursue a career as a racing trainer. In 1989 she received her trainer's license. After several years of working on the Northern California racing circuit, Gaines relocated permanently to Southern California in 1996.

"We used to use a stick which was far more severe for decades. It left welts. I rode horses all my life. I think the stick is necessary." Carla Gaines speaking about prospective whip rules in racing and her approach to riding.

As of 2025, Gaines's horses have earned over $39 million in race winnings over the course of her career across nearly 5,000 starts, with $1.35 million earned in 2024 alone. Gaines is based at Santa Anita and resides in Pasadena, California.

== Prominent horses ==
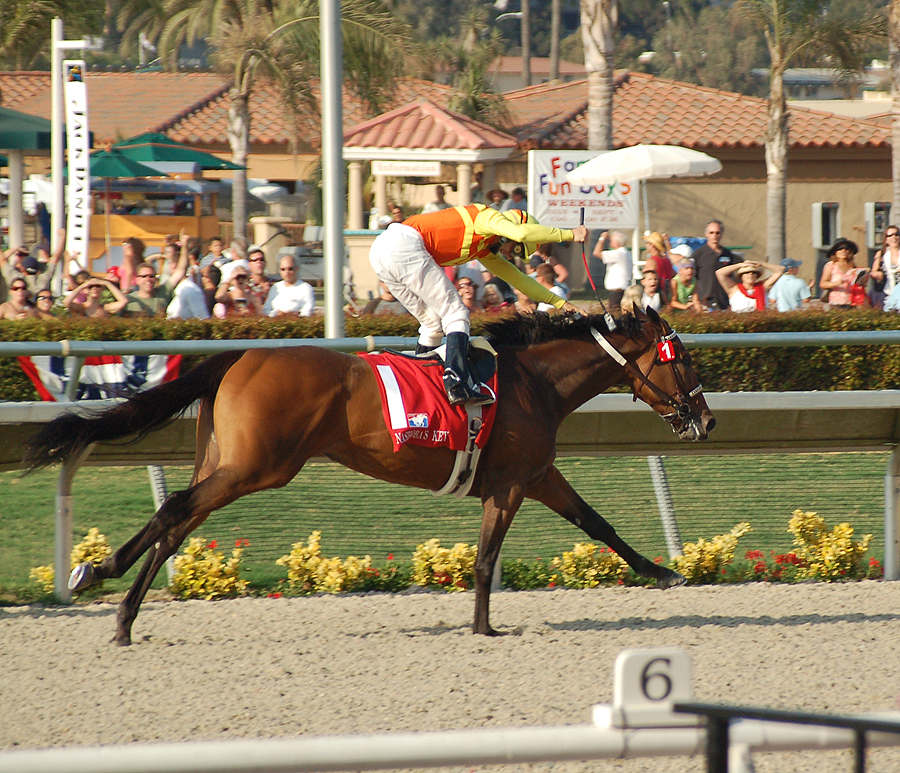
Nashoba's Key in 2007

In 2007, Gaines' trainee Nashoba's Key would go to win over $1m in winnings in just ten races before being euthanized after an accident. Nashoba's Key was named the 2009 California Horse of the Year and later inducted into the California Thoroughbred Breeders’ Association Hall of Fame in 2023.

In 2009, Gaines had the biggest win of her career when Dancing in Silks won the Sentient Jet Breeders' Cup Sprint at Santa Anita Park. Dancing in Silks owner advocated to enter the horse in the race against Gaines' advice. A longshot at the start of the race, Dancing in Silks won a purse of $1,080,000 for his victory in the race. Dancing in Silks was later named the 2009 California Horse of the Year, sharing the honor with California Flag.

In 2010 and 2011, Gaines campaigned Malibu Pier to multiple stakes wins and a place in the La Brea Handicap.

In 2015, Gaines brought Bolo to the Kentucky Derby, making history as the sixteenth female trainer to campaign a horse in the race. Bolo would end up finishing twelfth in the Derby. Four years later in 2019, Bolo won the $500,000 Shoemaker Mile Stakes at Santa Anita Park.

In 2024, her trainee mare Closing Remarks was named the 2023 Champion California-bred Turf Horse and Champion California-bred Older Female by the California Thoroughbred Breeders Association. Closing Remarks was retired from racing in March 2024.

In 2024, Gaines's trainee Hot Girl Walk won the $100,000 Generous Portion Stakes in Del Mar, California.

== Controversies ==
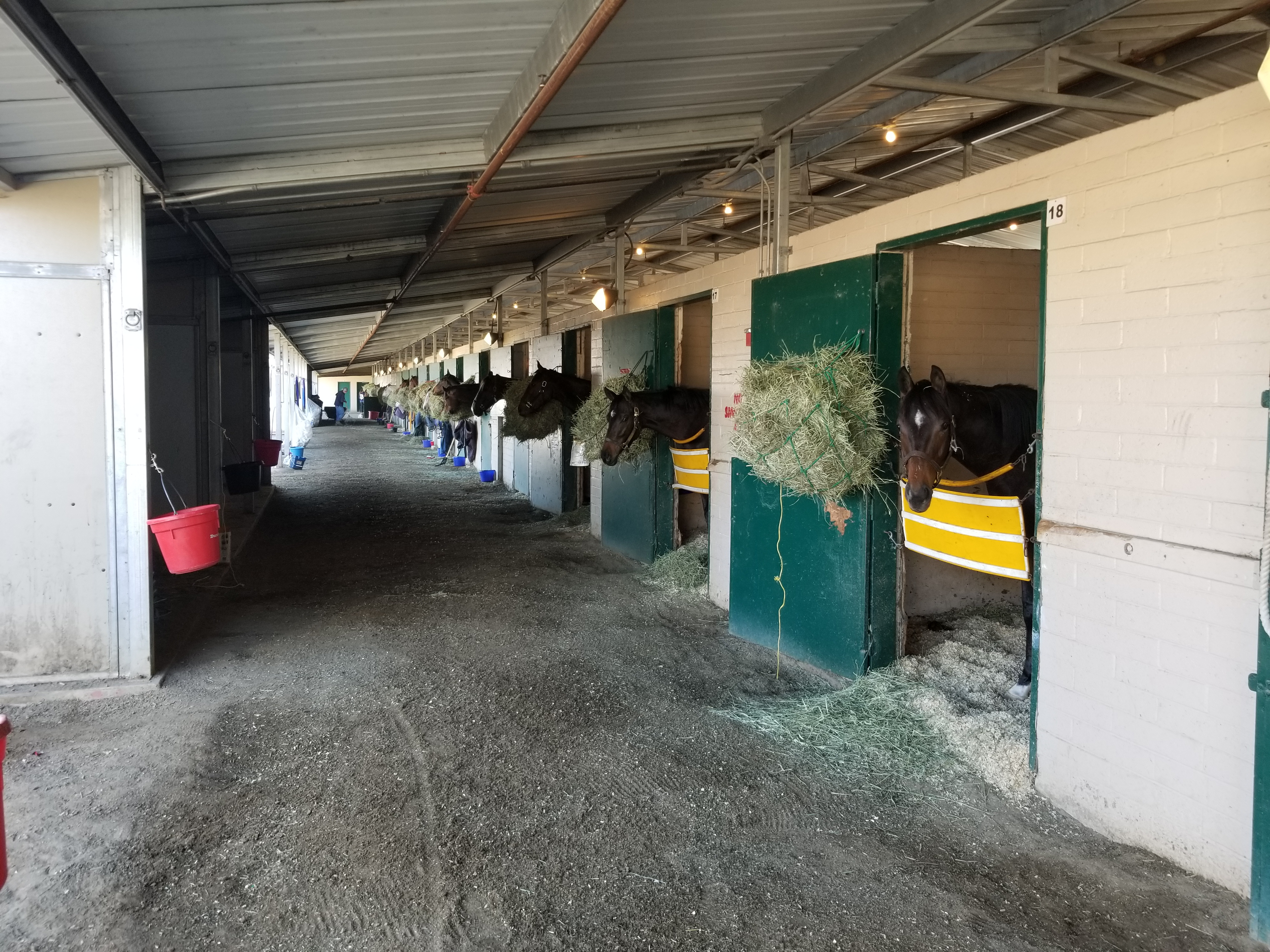
Stables at the Del Mar Fairgrounds, where Gaines keeps her horses during the Summer racing series.

Gaines has served several suspensions for violating racing regulations with regards to controlled substances. In 2013, Gaines was fined $2,500 and suspended for 30 days after two of her horses tested positive for testosterone the previous year. The suspension gained notoriety at the time as Gaines still visited the track despite being officially disqualified for attending.

In 2019, her trainee Charge A Bunch was killed instantly after colliding with another horse during training. The accident became highly publicized due to the death of two other horses involved, which were trained by Bob Baffert, as well as due to the Del Mar track's reputation for safety.

In 2023, Gaines was fined $1,000 and suspended for seven days after horses in her care tested positive for the banned tranquilizer acepromazine. She was additionally issued two penalty points.

In 2024, she was fined and received 1.5 Penalty Points for a medication violation which found the presence of Flunixin, a controlled substance in Big Summer after the horse's win in Del Mar.
