= Neil D. Drysdale =

American race horse trainer (born 1947)

Neil Drysdale
Personal information
- Born: 11 December 1947 (age 78) Haslemere, Surrey, England
- Occupation: Trainer

Horse racing career
- Sport: Horse racing
- Career wins: 1,414+ (ongoing)

Major racing wins
- Acorn Stakes (1980); Coaching Club American Oaks (1980); Spinster Stakes (1980, 1984); Kentucky Oaks (1980,1983); Clement L. Hirsch Turf Championship Stakes; (1984, 2003, 2005, 2007); Breeders' Futurity Stakes (1985); Ashland Stakes (1989); Frank E. Kilroe Mile Handicap (1990, 1991, 1998); Vanity Invitational Handicap (1990, 2005); Santa Anita Derby (1992); Hollywood Derby (1995); Ancient Title Stakes (1998); Eddie Read Handicap (1998, 2002, 2006); Yellow Ribbon Stakes (1998); Wood Memorial Stakes (2000); Turf Classic Stakes (2001); John C. Mabee Handicap (2004); American Classics / Breeders' Cup wins: Kentucky Derby (2000); Belmont Stakes (1992); Breeders' Cup Distaff (1984, 1993); Breeders' Cup Juvenile (1985); Breeders' Cup Turf (1989); Breeders' Cup Classic (1992); Breeders' Cup Mile (2000); International wins: Woodbine Mile (1989, 1996, 2003, 2006)

Honours
- National Museum of Racing and Hall of Fame (2000)

Significant horses
- A.P. Indy, Bold 'n Determined, Fusaichi Pegasus, Hawksley Hill, Hollywood Wildcat, Princess Rooney, Prized, Tasso, War Chant

Neil D. Drysdale (born 11 December 1947, Haslemere, Surrey, England) is an American-based thoroughbred race horse trainer.

Based in Playa Del Rey, California, he has won two Triple Crown races – the Belmont Stakes (G1) with A.P. Indy in 1992 and the Kentucky Derby (G1) with Fusaichi Pegasus in 2000. He was inducted into the National Museum of Racing and Hall of Fame in 2000.

== Career ==
Born in Haslemere, Surrey, his father was a Royal Marine who served with the U.S. Marines in Korea. Drysdale studied at the University of Barcelona and taught English as a foreign language - but then switched his mind to horses.

He moved to Florida to work with show horses and became involved with racing thoroughbreds, spending two years with John Hartigan at Tartan Farms in Ocala, Florida. He then moved to a thoroughbred stable in Argentina and managed a stud farm in Venezuela. Drysdale returned to the United States and worked as an assistant to Roger Laurin for two years then between 1970 and 1974, he was assistant to Charlie Whittingham in California. He says the most important things he learned from Whittingham were patience and planning. He began working for Corbin Robertson's Saron Stable in 1974, notably winning eight races with Bold 'n Determined in 1980 (a bicoastal Grade 1 winner between 1979 and 1981 and winner of 16 of 20 starts), including a triumph over eventual division champion Genuine Risk

In 1983, Drysdale opened his racing office in Playa Del Rey, California. His first major winner was Forceten and he has since saddled a total of 31 Breeders' Cup runners with six victories to his credit, including 1992 winner A.P. Indy - a total exceeded only by D. Wayne Lukas and Claude 'Shug' McGaughey. A.P. Indy plus Princess Rooney, Tasso and Hollywood Wildcat all went from winning the Breeders' Cup to win the Eclipse Awards with A.P. Indy voted the 1992 Eclipse Award for Horse of the Year.

Drysdale conditioned Hawksley Hill, Labeeb, French Deputy and Roanoke. Beyond his Grade 1 wins in the Kentucky Derby, Belmont Stakes and Breeder's Cup, Drysdale has also won the Acorn Stakes, Apple Blossom, CCA Oaks, Hollywood Derby, Santa Anita Derby and Molson Million

Drysdale's owners now include Sheikh Maktoum and Peter Vegso As horse racing has gone international, so has Drysdale, racing horses in Dubai, Hong Kong and South Africa

Inducted into Racing Hall of Fame in 2000, the year he won the Kentucky Derby with Fusaichi Pegasus, his first starter in the race.

=== 2000 Kentucky Derby ===
Purchased for $4 million as a yearling by venture capitalist Fusao Sekiguchi, Fusaichi Pegasus is a colt who is known to be temperamental. Known to stop and just look around, the colt caused a delay at the starting gate at the Wood Memorial by rearing to throw his exercise rider

But on 6 May 2000, in 82-degree heat and before 153,204 cheering fans (the second largest Derby crowd in history), Fusaichi Pegasus became the first Kentucky Derby winner since Spectacular Bid in 1979 to win the Derby as the betting favourite, and the first winner to have raced only once as a two-year-old. The others were Leonatus (1883), Tim Tam (1958) and Lucky Debonair (1965). Jockey Kent Desormeaux said he broke like a pony, after being trapped behind the group, but when an opening occurred, he came through strong on the rail in the stretch, taking the lead approaching the eighth pole and finishing 1½ lengths ahead of Aptitude. Fusaichi Pegasus earned an extra $250,000 paid to any colt who wins the Wood Memorial Stakes at Aqueduct and the Derby

After the Kentucky Derby, many believed that Fusaichi Pegasus would win the Triple Crown. However, he was defeated by Red Bullet in the Preakness Stakes and did not race in the third leg, the Belmont Stakes. He is currently standing stud at Ashford Stud in Versailles, Kentucky
