= Bruce McNall =

American sports executive (born 1950)

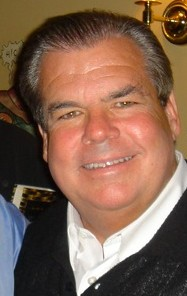
- Born: April 17, 1950 (age 76); Arcadia, California, United States
- Education: UCLA
- Occupations: Sports executive, film producer
- Known for: Owned the Los Angeles Kings of the National Hockey League (NHL) and the Toronto Argonauts of the Canadian Football League (CFL)
- Board member of: Los Angeles Kings; Toronto Argonauts

Bruce Patrick McNall (born April 17, 1950) is an American former sports executive who once owned the Los Angeles Kings of the National Hockey League (NHL) and the Toronto Argonauts of the Canadian Football League (CFL).

== Career ==
McNall claimed to have made his initial fortune as a coin collector, though Metropolitan Museum of Art director Thomas Hoving claimed he smuggled art antiquities as the partner of Robert E. Hecht. In the 1980s McNall produced several Hollywood movies, including The Manhattan Project and Weekend at Bernie's.

McNall bought a 25 percent stake in the Kings from Jerry Buss in 1986, and bought an additional 24 percent in 1987 to become the team's largest shareholder. He was named team president that September, and purchased Buss's remaining shares in March 1988.

In 1992, McNall was elected chairman of the NHL Board of Governors, the league's second-highest post.

At one point, he also owned the finest copy of the most expensive baseball card, Honus Wagner's 1909 T206 card.

In December 1993, McNall defaulted on a $90 million loan, and Bank of America threatened to force the Kings into bankruptcy unless he sold the team. He sold controlling interest in the Kings in May 1994 and resigned as chairman of the board of governors, though he still remained as president and governor of the Kings for a time.

In early 1994, he granted an interview to Vanity Fair in which he admitted smuggling many of his prized coins out of foreign countries; his admissions led to the shutting down of his numismatics firm, Numismatic Fine Arts, that year by the FBI (including seizure of computers and printed documents from NFA's offices in the Century City office complex). His claim of graduating from the University of Oxford was also debunked.

Later that year, McNall sold the Argos to league television partner TSN in May 1994, a sale delayed by John Candy's death that March. The team had lost several million dollars over four years, and McNall concluded he could not justify those losses as an absentee owner 3,000 miles away.

== Conviction ==
On December 14, 1994, McNall pleaded guilty to five counts of conspiracy and fraud, and admitted to bilking six banks out of $236 million over a ten-year period. He was sentenced to 70 months in prison. Immediately after his conviction, it emerged that his free-spending ways had put the Kings in serious financial jeopardy. They were ultimately forced into bankruptcy in 1995.

McNall was released in 2001 after his sentence was reduced by 13 months for good behavior. He was on probation until 2006. McNall remained on good terms with many of his former players, with Wayne Gretzky, Rob Blake, Luc Robitaille and others visiting him in prison. Gretzky even refused to allow the Kings to retire his number 99 until McNall could attend the ceremony. McNall also attended Robitaille's uniform retirement ceremony in 2007.

== Later life ==
McNall's autobiography, Fun While It Lasted: My Rise and Fall in the Land of Fame and Fortune, was published by Hyperion Books in 2003. In 2004, McNall became co-chair of A-Mark Entertainment. He took a role with Peter M. Hoffman at Seven Arts Pictures in 2003 and is credited on Nick Cassavetes' 2012 movie, Yellow.

Sporting positions
Preceded by Jerry Buss	Los Angeles Kings principal owner 1988–1994	Succeeded by Jeffrey Sudikoff; Joseph Cohen
Preceded by Bill Wirtz	Chairman of the NHL Board of Governors; 1992–1994	Succeeded by Harley Hotchkiss
