= Wayne Harris (Canadian jockey) =

Canadian jockey

Personal information
- Born: c. 1948 Vancouver, British Columbia, Canada
- Occupation: Jockey

Horse racing career
- Sport: Horse racing
- Career wins: not found

Major racing wins
- Nassau Stakes (1964); Seagram Cup Handicap (1964); Eclipse Stakes (1965, 1966); Nettie Handicap (1965); Marine Stakes (1965); Princess Elizabeth Stakes (1965); Queenston Stakes (1965); Wonder Where Stakes (1965); Maple Leaf Stakes (1966); Las Flores Handicap (1967); Beverly Hills Handicap (1968); Inglewood Handicap (1968); Santa Paula Stakes (1968); Vanity Handicap (1968, 1970); Arlington Matron Stakes (1969); Santa Monica Handicap (1969); San Bernardino Handicap (1970); Balboa Stakes (1973); Chula Vista Handicap (1975) Canadian Classic Race wins: Queen's Plate (1968)

Significant horses
- Ancient Title, Gamely, Merger, Triple Bend

Wayne Harris (born c. 1948) is a retired Canadian jockey in Thoroughbred horse racing who competed in Canada and the United States and who is best known for winning Canada's most prestigious race, the 1968 Queen's Plate.

A top jockey at Woodbine Racetrack and Greenwood Raceway in Toronto, in 1967 Harris relocated to race at tracks in California. At age twenty, he returned to Woodine for the 1968 running of the Queen's Plate where he rode Merger for Western Canadian businessmen, Max Bell and Frank McMahon.

Harris won a number of Graded stakes races in the United States and notably rode William H. Perry's U.S. Racing Hall of Fame filly Gamely to victory in the 1968 Vanity Handicap and the 1969 Santa Monica Handicap.
