= San Fernando Stakes =

- Class: Grade II
- Location: Santa Anita Park; Arcadia, California, United States
- Inaugurated: 1952
- Race type: Thoroughbred – Flat racing
- Website: www.santaanita.com

Race information
- Distance: 1 1/16 miles (8.5 furlongs)
- Surface: Dirt
- Track: left-handed
- Qualification: Four-years-old
- Weight: Assigned
- Purse: US$150,000

The San Fernando Stakes is an American Thoroughbred horse race held annually in mid January at Santa Anita Park in Arcadia, California. Open to four-year-old horses, it is contested on at a distance of 1 1/16 miles (8.5 furlongs) on the dirt main track.

First run in 1952, the San Fernando Stakes is the second leg of Santa Anita Park's Strub Series.

The race was contested at 1 1/8 miles from 1960 to 1997. It was run in two divisions in 1964, 1975, and 1977.

== Records ==
Speed record:

- 1:40.16 – Air Command (2008) (at current distance of 1 1/16 miles)
- 1:46.60 – In Excess (at previous distance of 1 1/8 miles)

Most wins by a jockey:

- 8 – Bill Shoemaker (1955, 1957, 1958, 1961, 1964, 1968, 1975, 1980)

Most wins by a trainer:

- 5 – Bob Baffert (1998, 2004, 2008, 2011, 2013)

Most wins by an owner:

- 2 – Gedney Farms (1964, 1977)
- 2 – Maxwell Gluck's Elmendorf Farm
- 2 – Jack Kent Cooke (1990, 1994)

== Winners ==
Year	Winner	Jockey	Trainer	Owner	Time
2013	Fed Biz	Mike E. Smith	Bob Baffert	Kaleem Shah, Inc	1:42.34
2012	Tapizar	Corey Nakatani	Steve Asmussen	Winchell Thoroughbreds, LLC	1:41.98
2011	Indian Firewater	Mike E. Smith	Bob Baffert	Karl Watson, M. Pegram, Paul Weitman	1:41.53
2010	Papa Clem	Tyler Baze	Gary Stute	Bo Hirsch	1:42.64
2009	Nownownow	Joe Talamo	Patrick L. Biancone	Fab Oak Stable	1:41.45
2008	Air Command	Aaron Gryder	Bob Baffert	Robert N. Clay & Faisal Salm	1:40.16
2007	Awesome Gem	Tyler Baze	Craig Dollase	West Point Thoroughbreds	1:41.90
2006	Unbridled Energy	Garrett Gomez	Richard E. Mandella	Doug Cauthen	1:44.33
2005	Minister Eric	René Douglas	Richard E. Mandella	Diamond A Racing	1:42.14
2004	During	David Flores	Bob Baffert	James McIngvale	1:41.63
2003	Pass Rush	Corey Nakatani	Patrick B. Byrne	Michael Tabor	1:42.97
2002	Western Pride	Garrett Gomez	James K. Chapman	Chapman & McArthur	1:41.30
2001	Tiznow	Chris McCarron	Jay M. Robbins	Michael Cooper, et al.	1:42.05
2000	Saint's Honor	Kent Desormeaux	Craig Dollase	Stephan G. Herold	1:41.94
1999	Dixie Dot Com	David Flores	William Morey Jr.	Chaiken, Chaiken & Heller	1:41.06
1998	Silver Charm	Gary Stevens	Bob Baffert	Bob & Beverly Lewis	1:41.94
1997	Northern Afleet	Chris McCarron	David E. Hofmans	Anderson & Waranch	1:48.59
1996	Helmsman	Chris McCarron	Wallace Dollase	Horizon Stable, Jarvis	1:48.87
1995	Wekiva Springs	Kent Desormeaux	Robert B. Hess Jr.	Donald R. Dizney & English	1:48.59
1994	Zignew	Chris McCarron	Daniel Smithwick	Jack Kent Cooke	1:47.87
1993	Bertrando	Chris McCarron	Robert J. Frankel	505 Farms & Marshall Nahem	1:51.22
1992	Best Pal	Kent Desormeaux	Gary F. Jones	Golden Eagle Farm	1:48.25
1991	In Excess	Gary Stevens	Bruce L. Jackson	Jack J. Munari	1:46.60
1990	Flying Continental	Corey Black	Jay M. Robbins	Jack Kent Cooke	1:47.20
1989	Mi Preferido	Chris McCarron	Laz Barrera	Barrera & Saiden	1:47.40
1988	On the Line	José A. Santos	D. Wayne Lukas	Eugene V. Klein	1:49.00
1987	Variety Road	Laffit Pincay Jr.	Bruce Headley	Kjell H. Qvale	1:49.00
1986	Right Con	Rafael Meza	Melvin F. Stute	William R. Hawn	1:48.40
1985	Precisionist	Chris McCarron	Ross Fenstermaker	Fred W. Hooper	1:47.40
1984	Interco	Patrick Valenzuela	Ted West	David I. Sofro	1:48.60
1983	Wavering Monarch	Eddie Delahoussaye	Laz Barrera	Glencrest Farm	1:50.00
1982	It's the One	Walter Guerra	Laz Barrera	Amin Saiden	1:47.60
1981	Doonesbury	Sandy Hawley	Barney Willis	Jones, Roffe, et al.	1:47.00
1980	Spectacular Bid	Bill Shoemaker	Bud Delp	Hawksworth Farm	1:48.00
1979	Radar Ahead	Darrel McHargue	Gary F. Jones	Sidney H. Vail	1:48.00
1978	Text	Fernando Toro	Vincent Clyne	Elmendorf Farm	1:49.40
1977	Kirby Lane	Laffit Pincay Jr.	Laz Barrera	Gedney Farms	1:47.60
1977	Pocket Park	Steve Cauthen	Ron McAnally	Elmendorf Farm	1:48.60
1976	Messenger of Song	Jerry Lambert	Gordon C. Campbell	Bernard J. Ridder	1:48.20
1975	Stardust Mel	Bill Shoemaker	Charlie Whittingham	Marjorie L. Everett	1:48.60
1975	First Back	Jacinto Vásquez	Ron McAnally	Post Time Stable	1:46.80
1974	Ancient Title	Laffit Pincay Jr.	Keith L. Stucki Sr.	Ethel Kirkland	1:47.60
1973	Bicker	Glenn Brogan	Robert Wingfield	Green Thumb Farm Stable	1:48.20
1972	Autobiography (DH)	Eddie Belmonte	Pancho Martin	Sigmund Sommer	1:47.20
1972	Triple Bend (DH)	Donald Pierce	Vance Longden	Frank M. McMahon	1:47.20
1971	Willowick	Eddie Belmonte	Joseph Manzi	Robert E. Hibbert	1:48.80
1970	no race				
1969	Cavamore	Eddie Belmonte	Buster Millerick	Mrs. M. Troy Jones	1:49.00
1968	Damascus	Bill Shoemaker	Frank Whiteley Jr.	Edith W. Bancroft	1:48.80
1967	Buckpasser	Braulio Baeza	Edward A. Neloy	Ogden Phipps	1:48.20
1966	Isle of Greece	Walter Blum	Hirsch Jacobs	Ethel D. Jacobs	1:48.60
1965	Hill Rise	Donald Pierce	William B. Finnegan	El Peco Ranch	1:48.40
1964	Nevada Battler	Manuel Ycaza	George D. Adams	J. Kel Houssels	1:48.80
1964	Gun Bow	Bill Shoemaker	Edward A. Neloy	Gedney Farms	1:47.80
1963	Crimson Satan	Herb Hinojosa	Charles Kerr	Crimson King Farm	1:47.20
1962	Four-and-Twenty	Johnny Longden	Vance Longden	Alberta Ranches, Ltd.	1:48.80
1961	Prove It	Bill Shoemaker	Mesh Tenney	Rex C. Ellsworth	1:47.60
1960	King O'Turf	Angel Valenzuela	Ron McAnally	M/M J. Ross Clark II	1:50.00
1959	Hillsdale	Tommy Barrow	Martin L. Fallon Jr.	Clarence Whitted Smith	1:42.40
1958	Round Table	Bill Shoemaker	William Molter	Kerr Stables	1:42.20
1957	Holandes II	Bill Shoemaker	Bob R. Roberts	Wood, De Benedetti, Roberts	1:43.20
1956	Beau Busher	Jack Westrope	Dale Landers	Sunnyside Stable	1:43.60
1955	Poona II	Bill Shoemaker	Red McDaniel	Helbush Farms	1:40.80
1954	By Zeus	Jack Westrope	William J. Hirsch	Cynthia Lasker	1:49.40
1953	Mark-Ye-Well	Eddie Arcaro	Horace A. Jones	Calumet Farm	1:44.20
1952	Counterpoint	Dave Gorman	Sylvester Veitch	C. V. Whitney	1:45.20

- † In 1977, Properantes won the 1st division of the race but was disqualified from first to second.
- In 1972 there was a Dead heat for first.
