= St. Vincent (horse) =

British-bred Thoroughbred racehorse

- Sire: Ocean Swell
- Grandsire: Blue Peter
- Dam: Light of Day
- Damsire: Hyperion
- Sex: Gelding
- Foaled: 1951
- Country: United States
- Colour: Bay
- Breeder: Lady Irwin
- Owner: 1) J. Gheen (England); 2) George R. Gardiner & Alberta Ranches Ltd. (USA)
- Trainer: Vance Longden
- Record: 72 Starts: 17-6-6
- Earnings: US$219,445

Major wins
- Prince of Wales's Nursery Handicap (1953); San Juan Capistrano Handicap (1955); Washington's Birthday Handicap (1955, 1957); Dixie Handicap (1955); San Gabriel Handicap (1955); Camino Real Distance Handicap (1960

Awards
- American Champion Male Turf Horse (1955)

St. Vincent (foaled 1951 in Great Britain) was a Thoroughbred racehorse who won in England and in the United States where he was a Champion who set or equaled five turf course records including two new North American records.

St. Vincent was purchased by Canadians George R. Gardiner and the Alberta Ranches Ltd. partnership of U.S. Racing Hall of Fame jockey and Kentucky Derby-winning trainer Johnny Longden, his son Vance, and businessmen Frank McMahon, Wilder H. Ripley, and Max Bell.

== Track and North American records ==
In 1955, St. Vincent was voted the American Champion Male Turf Horse after he equaled a track record and then set three new track records, two of which were North American marks:

- January 29: equaled track record at Santa Anita Park, 2:00 flat for 1 1/4 miles on turf.
- February 22: new North American record at Santa Anita Park, 2:25 2/5 for 1 1/2 miles on turf;
- March 5: new track record at Santa Anita Park, 2:46 4/5 for 1 3/4 miles on turf;
- May 21: new North American record: Pimlico Race Course, 2:15 2/5 for 1 3/8 miles on turf;

At age nine, St. Vincent made nineteen starts and won six times. He set another:

- new track record: Del Mar Racetrack, 1:33 flat for 7 furlongs
