= San Luis Obispo Handicap =

- Class: Grade II
- Location: Santa Anita Park; Arcadia, California, United States
- Inaugurated: 1950
- Race type: Thoroughbred – Flat racing
- Website: www.santaanita.com

Race information
- Distance: 1 1/2 miles (12 furlongs)
- Surface: Turf
- Track: Left-handed
- Qualification: Four-years-old & up
- Weight: Assigned
- Purse: US$150,000

The San Luis Obispo Handicap is an American Thoroughbred horse race held annually at Santa Anita Park in Arcadia, California. The race is open to horses age four and up, willing to race one and one-half miles on the turf. A Grade II event, it offers a purse of $150,000.

Inaugurated as the Washington's Birthday Handicap in 1950, it was run on dirt until 1954 when it became a turf race. For 1973, 1980 and 2005, the race was transferred to the dirt track. There was no race from 1963 through 1967 but returned in 1968 as the San Luis Obispo Handicap, named for the city of San Luis Obispo further up the Central Coast of California from Santa Anita Park.

It was started on the turf course's backstretch, instead of the hillside, in 1990, 1992 and 1993. Since inception it has been contested at various distances:

- 7 furlongs : 1950, 1952–53
- 1 1/4 miles (10 furlongs) : 1951, 1954, 1970
- About 1 1/2 miles (about 12 furlongs) : 1968, 1972 and 1993
- 1 1/2 miles (12 furlongs) : 1955–1969, 1971, 1973–1992, 1994–present

The San Luis Obispo Handicap was run in two divisions in 1968, 1972, and 1974.

== Records ==
Speed record: (at current distance of 1 1/2 miles)

- 2:23.80 – Captain Cee Jay (1974)

Most wins:

- 2 – St. Vincent (1955, 1957)
- 2 – Great Communicator (1988, 1989)
- 2 – Spring House (2008, 2009)

Most wins by an owner:

- 3 – Johnny Longden and/or Alberta Ranches (1955, 1957, 1982)

Most wins by a jockey:

- 9 – Bill Shoemaker (1952, 1956, 1962, 1972 (2), 1977, 1980, 1983, 1987)

Most wins by a trainer:

- 8 – Charles Whittingham (1968, 1971, 1972 (2), 1977, 1983, 1987, 1990)

== Winners ==
Year	Winner	Age	Jockey	Trainer	Owner	Time
2011	Champ Pegasus	5	Joel Rosario	Richard Mandella	Diamond A Racing Corporation and Arturo Vargas	2:31.55
2010	Bourbon Bay	4	Rafael Bejarano	Neil Drysdale	David and Jill Heerensperger	2:28.89
2009	Spring House	7	Alex Solis	Julio C. Canani	Randall D. Hubbard	2:27.26
2008	Spring House	6	Garrett Gomez	Julio C. Canani	Randall D. Hubbard	2:27.21
2007	Obrigado	4	Garrett Gomez	Neil D. Drysdale	G. Seidler & P. Vegso	2:27.21
2006	Atlando	5	Martin Pedroza	Darrell Vienna	Gary A. Tanaka	2:23.95
2005	License To Run	5	Patrick Valenzuela	Robert J. Frankel	TNT Stud	2:28.72
2004	Puerto Banus	5	Victor Espinoza	Kristin Mulhall	Noctis Stable et al.	2:28.00
2003	The Tin Man	5	Mike E. Smith	Richard Mandella	Aury & Ralph Todd	2:31.22
2002	Nazirali	5	Brice Blanc	Julio C. Canani	Michael House	2:26.09
2001	Persianlux	5	Tyler Baze	Wallace Dollase	Horizon Stable et al.	2:27.70
2000	Dark Moondancer	5	Chris McCarron	Ron McAnally	Charles J. Cella	2:39.61
1999	Kessem Power	7	Gary Stevens	Mike R. Mitchell	Robert J. Baron	2:28.02
1998	Bienvenido	5	Chris McCarron	Ron McAnally	Sidney Craig	2:29.34
1997	Shanawi	5	Brice Blanc	Jenine Sahadi	Ghanem & Sloan	2:24.51
1996	Windsharp	5	Ed Delahoussaye	Wallace Dollase	Richard & Martha Stephen	2:30.33
1995	Square Cut	6	Chris Antley	Joseph Devereux	E. W. Racing Stable	2:26.04
1994	Fanmore	6	Kent Desormeaux	Robert J. Frankel	Juddmonte Farms	2:27.03
1993	Kotashaan	5	Kent Desormeaux	Richard Mandella	La Presle Farm	2:27.64
1992	Quest for Fame	5	Gary Stevens	Robert J. Frankel	Juddmonte Farms	2:28.79
1991	Rial	6	Jorge Velásquez	Enrique Boelcke	Enrique Boelcke	2:24.00
1990	Frankly Perfect	5	Chris McCarron	Charles Whittingham	W. Gretzky/Summa Stable	2:28.00
1989	Great Communicator	6	Ray Sibille	Thad Ackel	Class Act Stable (George Ackel)	2:30.20
1988	Great Communicator	5	Ray Sibille	Thad Ackel	Class Act Stable (George Ackel)	2:27.60
1987	Louis Le Grand	5	Bill Shoemaker	Charles Whittingham	Allen E. Paulson	2:28.40
1986	Talakeno	6	Pat Valenzuela	Laz Barrera	Happy Valley Farm	2:33.20
1985	Western	7	Gary Stevens	Laz Barrera	Aaron U. Jones	2:26.00
1984	Sir Pele	5	Rafael Meza	Laz Barrera	Aaron U. Jones	2:27.40
1983	Pelerin	6	Bill Shoemaker	Charles Whittingham	Doherty & Snowden	2:24.60
1982	Regal Bearing	6	Joe Steiner	Johnny Longden	Longden & Carr Stables	2:27.20
1981	John Henry	6	Laffit Pincay Jr.	Ron McAnally	Dotsam Stable	2:24.00
1980	Silver Eagle	6	Bill Shoemaker	Thomas Bell Jr.	Gayno Stable et al.	2:30.20
1979	Fluorescent Light	5	Laffit Pincay Jr.	Angel Penna Sr.	Ogden Mills Phipps	2:28.20
1978	Copper Mel	6	Sandy Hawley	Tommy Doyle	Cathryn Charles	2:28.00
1977	Royal Derby II	8	Bill Shoemaker	Charles Whittingham	Fogelson/Whittingham	2:24.80
1976	Announcer	4	Fernando Toro	Vincent Clyne	Elmendorf Farm	2:30.80
1975	Madison Palace	7	Laffit Pincay Jr.	Farrell W. Jones	Sultan & Valenti	2:30.20
1974	Captain Cee Jay	4	Fernando Alvarez	Syl Veitch	Saron Stable	2:23.80
1974	Astray	5	Jacinto Vásquez	David A. Whiteley	William Haggin Perry	2:24.40
1973	Queen's Hustler	4	Rudy Rosales	Gene Cleveland	Laguna Seca & Ward	2:27.20
1972	Practicante	6	Bill Shoemaker	Charles Whittingham	Claiborne Farm	2:26.40
1972	Lord Derby	5	Bill Shoemaker	Charles Whittingham	Llangollen Farm	2:27.40
1971	Daryl's Joy	5	Johnny Sellers	Charles Whittingham	Robert K. C. Goh	2:29.20
1970	Quilche	6	Jerry Lambert	Steve Ippolito	Kerr Stable	1:58.00
1969	Quicken Tree	6	Bill Hartack	Clyde Turk	L. R. Rowan/W. Whitney Jr.	2:37.60
1968	Dr. Isby	4	Walter Blum	Bob R. Roberts	Bent Tree Ranch	2:27.80
1968	Tumble Wind	4	Johnny Sellers	Charles Whittingham	Rock Spring & Langollen	2:27.00
	no race 1963–1967					
1962	The Axe II	4	Bill Shoemaker	Robert L. Wheeler	Greentree Stable	2:37.00
1961	Geechee Lou	5	Johnny Longden	Gilbert Guariglia	Lawrence J. Krakower	2:26.00
1960	Twentyone Guns	5	George Taniguchi	T. F. M. Smith	Eyrauds & Sandahl	2:26.00
1959	Hakuchikara	6	Raymond York	Robert L. Wheeler	Hiroshi Nishi	2:32.40
1958	Tall Chief II	6	Johnny Longden	William Molter	Golden Gate Stables	2:30.20
1957	St. Vincent	6	Johnny Longden	Vance Longden	Gardiner/Alberta Ranches	2:26.00
1956	Blue Volt	7	Bill Shoemaker	Edward D. Cox	Altandor Stable & Cox	2:26.80
1955	St. Vincent	4	Johnny Longden	Vance Longden	Gardiner/Alberta Ranches	2:25.40
1954	13 of Diamonds	5	Johnny Longden	Vance Longden	Alberta Ranches, Ltd.	2:00.00
1953	Reighs Bull	5	Jack Westrope	Allen Drumheller Sr.	Tom Ross & Asa Brunk	1:22.80
1952	Pet Bully	4	Bill Shoemaker	Howard Hoffman	Ada L. Rice	1:22.40
1951	Be Fleet	4	Nick Wall	George E. Mayberry	Andrew J. Crevolin	2:01.80
1950	But Why Not	6	William Boland	William J. Hirsch	King Ranch	1:23.20
