= San Gabriel Stakes =

- Class: Grade II
- Location: Santa Anita Park; Arcadia, California, United States
- Inaugurated: 1935
- Race type: Thoroughbred – Flat racing
- Website: Santa Anita Park

Race information
- Distance: 1 1/8 miles (9 furlongs)
- Surface: Turf
- Track: Left-handed
- Qualification: Three-years-old & up
- Weight: Assigned
- Purse: US$201,000

The San Gabriel Stakes is an American Thoroughbred horse race run at Santa Anita Park in Arcadia, California at the close of each year (though on occasion it is run in very early January). The Grade II race is open to horses, age three and up, willing to race one and one-eighth miles on the turf and offers a current purse of $201,000.

First run in 1935, it was contested on dirt through 1954. Since inception, the San Gabriel Handicap has been contested under various conditions and distances:

- 3 furlongs : 1935, 1937, 1938, for two-year-olds
- 6 furlongs : 1945–1946, for three-year-olds
- 7 furlongs : 1952–1954, as the San Gabriel Stakes for three-year-olds
- 9 furlongs : 1960–present
- 10 furlongs (1 1/4 miles) : 1955–1959.

The race has been contested twice in six of its years: in January and then again in December 1973, 1980, 1988, 1997, 2001, and 2006. It was run in two divisions in 1984.

The race was transferred to the dirt track in 1972, 1974, 1977, 1978, 1987, December 1988, 2005 and 2008.

There was no race in 1936, 1939–1944, 1947–1951, 1970, 1976, 1982, 1991, 1999 and 2004.

== Records ==
Speed record: (at current distance of 1 1/8 miles)

- 1:46.20 – Wretham (1989)

Most wins:

- 3 – Jeranimo (2010, 2013, 2014)

Most wins by an owner:

- 3 – B. J. Wright (2010, 2013, 2014)

Most wins by a jockey:

- 6 – Rafael Bejarano (2008, 2009, 2010, 2012, 2013, 2014)

Most wins by a trainer:

- 7 – Charles Whittingham (1957, 1966, 1971, 1977, 1984, 1985, 1997)

== Winners ==
Year	Winner	Age	Jockey	Trainer	Owner	Time
2025	Cabo Spirit	6	Mike E. Smith	George Papaprodromou	Kretz Racing LLC	1:47.34
2024	Johannes	4	Umberto Rispoli	Tim Yakteen	Cuyathy LLC	1:46.50
2023	Easter	5	Antonio Fresu	Philip D'Amato	Madaket Stables LLC	1:47.60
2022	Dicey Mo Chara	4	Juan J. Hernandez	Leonard Powell	Red Baron's Barn LLC & Rancho Temescal LLC	1:47.78
2021	Bob and Jackie	5	Jose Valdivia Jr.	Richard Baltas	Calvin Nguyen and Joey Tran	1:53.51
2020	Desert Stone	5	Geovanni Franco	Richard Baltas	Zayat Stables	1:47.63
2019	Next Shares	6	Joel Rosario	Richard Baltas	Michael Iavarone et al.	1:48.61
2018	Itsinthepost	6	Tyler Baze	Jeff Mullins	Red Baron's Barn LLC	1:47.59
2017	Blue Tone	8	Kent J. Desormeaux	Robert B. Hess Jr.	Engelberg/Schoeder Farms/Steeper	1:49.82
2016	Flamboyant (FR)	5	Brice Blanc	Patrick Gallagher	Bienstock/Winner	1:46.64
2015	Finnegans Wake	6	Victor Espinoza	Peter Miller	Donegal Racing/Rockingham Ranch	1:48.38
2014	Jeranimo	8	Rafael Bejarano	Michael Pender	LaPenta/Wright	1:46.00
2013	Jeranimo	7	Rafael Bejarano	Michael Pender	B. J. Wright	1:46.50
2012	Norvsky	6	Rafael Bejarano	Donald Warren	E.W. and Judy Johnston & Robert Riggio	1:47.03
2011	no race					
2010	Jeranimo	4	Rafael Bejarano	Michael Pender	B. J. Wright	1:47.20
2009	Proudinsky	6	Rafael Bejarano	Humberton Ascanio	Johanna Louise Glen-Teven	1:46.91
2008	Proudinsky	5	Rafael Bejarano	Robert J. Frankel	Johanna Glen-Teven	1:48.39
2007	Daytona	3	Mike E. Smith	Dan L. Hendricks	Jeff Davenport, et al.	1:47.57
2006	King's Drama	6	David Flores	Robert J. Frankel	Gary A. Tanaka	1:48.53
2006	Badge of Silver	6	Pat Valenzuela	Robert J. Frankel	Ken & Sarah Ramsey	1:50.02
2005	Truly A Judge	7	Martin Pedroza	David Bernstein	A. Aidekman/G. Ailshie/T. Harris	1:48.90
2004	no race					
2003	Redattore	8	Alex Solis	Richard E. Mandella	Luis Alfredo Taunay	1:48.17
2002	Grammarian	4	Jose Valdivia Jr.	C. Beau Greely	Pacific Heritage Farm	1:48.12
2001	Irish Prize	5	Gary Stevens	Neil D. Drysdale	Maktoum al Maktoum	1:50.56
2001	Irish Prize	5	Kent Desormeaux	Neil D. Drysdale	Maktoum al Maktoum	1:47.88
2000	Brave Act	6	Alex Solis	Ronald McAnally	Sidney H. Craig	1:49.25
1999	no race					
1998	Brave Act	4	Goncalino Almeida	Ronald McAnally	Sidney H. Craig	1:46.78
1997	Martiniquais	4	Corey Nakatani	Robert J. Frankel	Edmund A. Gann (Lessee)	1:48.42
1997	Rainbow Blues	4	Gary Stevens	Charles Whittingham	Frankfurt Stable	1:46.89
1996	Romarin	6	Corey Nakatani	Richard E. Mandella	L. E. de Paula Machado	1:49.69
1995	Romarin	5	Corey Nakatani	Richard E. Mandella	L. E. de Paula Machado	1:49.36
1994	Earl of Barking	4	Chris McCarron	Richard L. Cross	Henry E. Pabst	1:48.64
1993	Star of Cozzene	5	Gary Stevens	Mark A. Hennig	Team Valor, et al.	1:48.33
1992	Classic Fame	6	Eddie Delahoussaye	Gary F. Jones	Classic Thoroughbreds	1:46.69
1991	no race					
1990	In Excess	3	Gary Stevens	Bruce L. Jackson	Jack J. Munari	1:47.20
1989	Wretham	4	Laffit Pincay Jr.	Neil D. Drysdale	Relatively Stable	1:46.20
1988	Simply Majestic	4	Jerry Bailey	John Parisella	Ted Sabarese	1:47.40
1988	Conquering Hero	5	Gary Stevens	Darrell Vienna	No Problem Stable, et al.	1:50.60
1987	Nostalgia's Star	5	Laffit Pincay Jr.	John W. Russell	Duckett, Hinds & Robbins	1:51.20
1986	Yashgan	5	Chris McCarron	John Sullivan	Paniolo Ranch, et al.	1:49.60
1985	Dahar	4	Fernando Toro	Charles Whittingham	Summa Stable (Lessee)	1:47.60
1984	Prince Florimund	6	Pat Valenzuela	Charles Whittingham	E. W. Miller	1:48.20
1984	Beldale Lustre	5	Laffit Pincay Jr.	John Gosden	Will A. Bailey	1:48.80
1983	Greenwood Star	6	Donald Pierce	John W. Russell	David K. Harris	1:47.20
1982	no race					
1981	The Bart	5	Eddie Delahoussaye	John Sullivan	Franklin N. Groves	1:48.00
1980	Premier Ministre	4	Laffit Pincay Jr.	Laz Barrera	Dolly Green	1:48.20
1980	John Henry	5	Darrel McHargue	Ronald McAnally	Dotsam Stable	1:49.80
1979	Fluorescent Light	5	Ángel Cordero Jr.	Angel Penna Sr.	Ogden Mills Phipps	1:47.60
1978	Mr. Redoy	4	Sandy Hawley	Tommy Doyle	Felty J. Yoder	1:48.40
1977	Riot in Paris	6	Bill Shoemaker	Charles Whittingham	M. F. Bradley & Whittingham	1:50.00
1976	no race					
1975	Zanthe	6	Sandy Hawley	Robert J. Frankel	Martin Ritt	1:47.40
1974	Fair Test	6	Angel Santiago	Vincent Clyne	Elmendorf Farm	1:50.60
1973	Astray	4	Jacinto Vásquez	Paul K. Parker	William Haggin Perry	1:48.20
1973	Kentuckian	4	Donald Pierce	David A. Whiteley	Preston Madden	1:47.60
1972	Big Shot II	7	Eddie Belmonte	Pancho Martin	Sigmund Sommer	1:48.60
1971	Cougar II	5	Bill Shoemaker	Charles Whittingham	Mary F. Jones	1:52.60
1970	no race					
1969	Easy Mark	4	Eddie Belmonte	Laz Barrera	High Tide Stable	1:49.00
1968	Rivet	4	Merlin Volzke	Dale Landers	Pierce Doty	1:50.60
1967	Flag	7	Walter Blum	Wayne B. Stucki	M/M Roy C. Kidder	1:47.60
1966	Perfect Sky	4	Álvaro Pineda	Charles Whittingham	Foxcatcher Farms	1:55.00
1965	Biggs	5	William Harmatz	Leonard Dorfman	E. F. Gould	1:49.00
1964	Marlin Bay	4	Manuel Ycaza	A. W. Beuzeville	Verna Lea Farm	1:48.40
1963	Dusky Damion	6	Ismael Valenzuela	William B. Finnegan	Swiftsure Stable	1:48.40
1962	Art Market	4	Ismael Valenzuela	Hirsch Jacobs	Jerome Fendrick	1:48.40
1961	Geechee Lou	5	Johnny Longden	Gilbert Guariglia	Lawrence J. Krakower	1:46.60
1960	Eddie Schmidt	7	Alex Maese	Frank L. Carr	Elobee Farm	1:49.60
1959	MacBern	4	Henry Moreno	William J. Hirsch	King Ranch	2:00.40
1958	Tall Chief II	6	William Harmatz	William Molter	Golden Gate Stables	1:59.80
1957	Corn Husker	4	George Taniguchi	Charles Whittingham	Llangollen Farm Stable	2:00.20
1956	Star of Ross	4	Rogelio Trejos	William B. Finnegan	Neil S. McCarthy	2:01.20
1955	St. Vincent	4	Johnny Longden	Vance Longden	G. Gardiner & Alberta Ranches	2:00.00
1954	Determine	3	Raymond York	William Molter	Andrew J. Crevolin	1:24.40
1953	Decorated	3	Johnny Longden	William Molter	Andrew J. Crevolin	1:23.00
1952	Windy City II	3	Eddie Arcaro	Willie Alavardo	Mrs. Petite Luellwitz	1:22.40
1947	no race 1947–1951					
1946	Sun Lady	4	Hubert Trent	Andrew G. Blakely	Longchamps Farm	1:10.40
1945	Vain Prince	6	George Woolf	Clyde Phillips	Mrs. Clyde Phillips	1:11.40
1939	no race 1939–1944					
1938	Morning Breeze	2	Ned Merritt	Hurst Philpot	Neil S. McCarthy	0:33.40
1937	Rolling Ball	2	George Woolf	Walter W. Taylor	Silver State Stable	0:34.00
1936	no race					
1935	Forced Landing	2	Alfred Robertson	John A. Healey	C. V. Whitney	0:34.60
