= William B. Finnegan =

Personal information
- Born: September 19, 1890 New York City, New York, United States
- Died: October 18, 1970 (aged 80)
- Occupation: Trainer

Horse racing career
- Sport: Horse racing

Major racing wins
- California Breeders' Champion Stakes (1936, 1963); Escondido Handicap (1937); San Diego Handicap (1937); La Jolla Mile (1938, 1969); Hollywood Derby (1939); Hollywood Gold Cup (1941); McLennan Handicap (1941); Washington Park Handicap (1941); Widener Challenge Cup (1941); Bahamas Stakes (1946); Fashion Stakes (1947); Bing Crosby Handicap (1950, 1959); Del Mar Handicap (1952); Questionnaire Handicap (1953); Del Mar Futurity (1954); Starlet Stakes (1954); La Jolla Handicap (1955); San Felipe Stakes (1955, 1959, 1964); San Gabriel Handicap (1956, 1963); Santa Monica Handicap (1957); Californian Stakes (1958); San Carlos Handicap (1958); Santa Anita Oaks (1958); Oceanside Handicap (1959); San Vicente Stakes (1959); Los Angeles Handicap (1960); Malibu Stakes (1960); Palos Verdes Handicap (1960); San Marcos Stakes (1961); Derby Trial Stakes (1964); Forerunner Stakes (1964); Santa Anita Derby (1964); Man o' War Stakes (1965); San Fernando Stakes (1965); Santa Anita Handicap (1965); San Antonio Handicap (1966); Sunset Handicap (1967); Del Mar Oaks (1968); El Encino Stakes (1968); Ramona Handicap (1969)

Significant horses
- Big Pebble, Count Turf, Hill Rise

William B. Finnegan (September 19, 1890 – October 18, 1970) was an American Thoroughbred horse racing trainer.

A native of New York City, Finnegan spent more than fifty years as a trainer primarily on the West Coast of the United States. During his career he conditioned horses for major stable owners such as Vera S. Bragg, movie mogul Louis B. Mayer, Walter P. Chrysler Jr., Edward S. Moore's Circle M Ranch stable, George A. Pope, Jr.'s El Peco Ranch, and Neil S. McCarthy who would name one of his horses in his honor.

Following its opening in December 1929, Finnegan was racing at Agua Caliente Racetrack in Tijuana, Mexico. Racing in California, where he would make his home in Arcadia near Santa Anita Park, Finnegan won the 1939 Hollywood Derby with Shining One who equalled the Hollywood Park track record. In 1940, he took over as the trainer of Big Pebble after the four-year-old was purchased by client, Edward S. Moore. Raced by his former owner at age two and three, Big Pebble showed little and had even been used as a lead pony. Under Finnegan in 1941, Big Pebble blossomed into the best older horse in the United States. En route to being named American Champion Older Male Horse, Big Pebble's wins included the most important and richest race in Florida, the Widener Challenge Cup at Hialeah Park Race Track and the prestigious Hollywood Gold Cup at California's Hollywood Park Racetrack.

In October 1951, that year's Kentucky Derby winner Count Turf was sent to Bill Finnegan to race in California but met with little success. Thirteen years late, Finnegan would have the betting favorite going into the 1964 U.S. Triple Crown series with George A. Pope, Jr.'s colt, Hill Rise. The winner of eight straight races, including the Santa Anita Derby by six lengths in record time and the Derby Trial by more than two lengths, Hill Rise ran second to Northern Dancer in the Kentucky Derby and third to him in the Preakness Stakes. The following year Hill Rise won several important races for Finnegan including the Man o' War Stakes, San Fernando Stakes and Santa Anita Handicap and at age five in 1966, the San Antonio Handicap.

William Finnegan continued to train horses until his death in 1970 at age eighty. He is buried in the Live Oak Memorial Park Cemetery in Monrovia, California.
