= Jay M. Robbins =

American horse trainer

Jay Robbins
Personal information
- Born: December 2, 1945 (age 80) Pasadena, California, United States
- Occupation: Trainer

Horse racing career
- Sport: Horse racing
- Career wins: Not found

Major racing wins
- Chula Vista Handicap (1977); Oceanside Stakes (1977); San Felipe Stakes (1977); Sorrento Stakes (1977); Santa Ana Handicap (1980); El Cajon Stakes (1985); Strub Stakes (1986, 1990); Hawthorne Gold Cup Handicap (1987); Affirmed Handicap (1989, 2000, 2005); Santa Catalina Stakes (1989); Jockey Club Gold Cup (1990); San Carlos Handicap (1990); San Fernando Stakes (1990, 2001); Del Mar Mile Handicap (1992); Goodwood Stakes (1992, 1993, 2000); Super Derby (2000); Santa Anita Handicap (2001); Malibu Stakes (2007); Vernon O. Underwood Stakes (2008) Breeders' Cup wins: Breeders' Cup Classic (2000, 2001)

Significant horses
- Flying Continental, Tiznow

Jay M. Robbins (born December 2, 1945, in Pasadena, California) is an American trainer in thoroughbred horse racing based in California. He is the son of veterinarian Dr. Jack Robbins, President and founding Director of Oak Tree Racing Association.

Jay Robbins trained Tiznow, who won the Eclipse Award for Horse of the Year in 2000 and who is the only horse to win two Breeders' Cup Classic races.
