= Santa Anita Derby top three finishers =

This is a listing of the horses that finished in either first, second, or third place and the number of starters in the Santa Anita Derby, an American Grade 1 race for three-year-olds at 1-1/8 miles on the dirt held at Santa Anita Park in Arcadia, California. (List 1973–present)

Year	Winner	Second	Third	Starters
2025	Journalism	Baeza	Westwood	5
2024	Stronghold	Imagination	E J Won The Cup	8
2023	Practical Move	Manderin Hero	Skinner	8
2022	Taiba	Messier	Happy Jack	6
2021	Rock Your World	Medina Spirit	Dream Shake	8
2020	Honor A. P.	Authentic	Rushie	7
2019	Roadster	Game Winner	Instagrand	6
2018	Justify	Bolt d'Oro	Core Beliefs	7
2017	Gormley	Battle of Midway	Royal Mo	13
2016	Exaggerator	Mor Spirit	Uncle Lino	8
2015	Dortmund	One Lucky Dane	Bolo	6
2014	California Chrome	Hoppertunity	Candy Boy	8
2013	Goldencents	Flashback	Super Ninety Nine	8
2012	I'll Have Another	Creative Cause	Blueskiesnrainbows	9
2011	Midnight Interlude	Comma to the Top	Mr. Commons	9
2010	Sidney's Candy	Setsuko	Lookin at Lucky	11
2009	Pioneerof the Nile	Chocolate Candy	Mr. Hot Stuff	7
2008	Colonel John	Bob Black Jack	Coast Guard	11
2007	Tiago	King of the Roxy	Sam P.	10
2006	Brother Derek	Point Determined	A. P. Warrior	5
2005	Buzzards Bay	General John B	Wilko	11
2004	Castledale	Imperialism	Rock Hard Ten	7
2003	Buddy Gil	Indian Express	Kafwain	9
2002	Came Home	Easy Grades	Lusty Latin	8
2001	Point Given	Crafty C. T.	I Love Silver	6
2000	The Deputy	War Chant	Captain Steve	6
1999	General Challenge	Prime Timber	Desert Hero	8
1998	Indian Charlie	Real Quiet	Artax	7
1997	Free House	Silver Charm	Hello	10
1996	Cavonnier	Honour and Glory	Corker	8
1995	Larry the Legend	Afternoon Deelites	Jumron	8
1994	Brocco	Tabasco Cat	Strodes Creek	6
1993	Personal Hope	Union City	Eliza	7
1992	A.P. Indy	Bertrando	Casual Lies	7
1991	Dinard	Best Pal	Sea Cadet	9
1990	Mister Frisky	Video Ranger	Warcraft	8
1989	Sunday Silence	Flying Continental	Music Merci	6
1988	Winning Colors	Lively One	Mi Preferido	9
1987	Temperate Sil	Masterful Advocate	Something Lucky	6
1986	Snow Chief	Icy Groom	Ferdinand	7
1985	Skywalker	Fast Account	Nostalgia's Star	9
1984	Mighty Adversary	Precisionist	Prince True	8
1983	Marfa	My Habitony	Naevus	10
1982	Muttering	Prince Spellbound	Journey At Sea	9
1981	Splendid Spruce	Johnlee n' Harold	Hoedown's Day	13
1980	Codex	Rumbo	Bic's Gold	9
1979	Flying Paster	Beau's Eagle	Switch Partners	10
1978	Affirmed	Balzac	Think Snow	12
1977	Habitony	For The Moment	Steve's Friend	15
1976	An Act	Double Discount	Life's Hope	9
1975	Avatar	Rock of Ages	Diablo	7
1974	Destroyer	Aloha Mood	Agitate	8
1973	Sham	Linda's Chief	Out of the East	6
