= Four-and-Twenty =

American-bred Thoroughbred racehorse

- Sire: Blue Prince
- Grandsire: Princequillo
- Dam: Sixpence
- Damsire: Ballyogan
- Sex: Stallion
- Foaled: 1958
- Country: United States
- Colour: Bay
- Breeder: Alberta Ranches, Ltd.
- Owner: Alberta Ranches, Ltd.
- Trainer: Vance Longden
- Record: 32: 13-2-5
- Earnings: US$447,580

Major wins
- Forerunner Stakes (1961); Hollywood Derby (1961); Santa Anita Derby (1961); Cinema Handicap (1961); Will Rogers Stakes (1961); Santa Anita Maturity (1962); San Carlos Handicap (1962); San Fernando Stakes (1962); San Bernardino Handicap (1962); Tropicana Hotel of Las Vegas Handicap (1963)

Four-and-Twenty (foaled 1958 in Kentucky) was an American Thoroughbred racehorse. The name comes from the lyrics to Sing a Song of Sixpence.

== Background ==
Four-and-Twenty was bred and raced by the Alberta Ranches, Ltd. partnership of Max Bell, Frank McMahon and superstar jockey Johnny Longden and his son, Vance. He was sired by a son of the two-time Leading sire in North America, Princequillo. His dam was Sixpence, a good runner in England and Ireland voted the 1953 British Champion Two-Year-Old Filly.

Four-and-Twenty's name came from a line in the nursery rhyme featuring the name used by his dam, titled Sing a Song of Sixpence.

== Racing career ==
Four-and-Twenty was ridden by Johnny Longden and trained by his son, Vance. In his three-year-old season in 1961, the colt won California's most important race for his age group, the one and one-eighth-mile Santa Anita Derby. He was then sent to Churchill Downs in Louisville, Kentucky where he suffered the first loss of his career when he finished second to Crozier in the Derby Trial Stakes. Remaining at Churchill downs, Four-and-Twenty was entered in the first leg of the U.S. Triple Crown series, the one and one-quarter-mile Kentucky Derby. On race day he was sent off as the third choice among bettors behind favorite Carry Back and second choice, Crozier. In the race, Four-and-Twenty moved into the lead as the field headed for the homestretch but found the extra one-eighth of a mile too much and quickly faded in midstretch. He wound up in seventh place behind winner, Carry Back. The colt rebounded to win important races in 1961 such as the Hollywood Derby.

Competing at age four in California in races at a mile and an eight or less, Four-and-Twenty won a number of important events including the 1962 Santa Anita Maturity, San Carlos Handicap, San Fernando Stakes, and the San Bernardino Handicap. He returned to racing at age five, winning the Tropicana Hotel of Las Vegas Handicap at Bay Meadows Racetrack in San Mateo, California.

== Stud record ==
Retired to stud, Four-and-Twenty's offspring met with modest success in racing. Among his progeny was the multiple stakes winner, Haveago, whose wins included the 1971 Bing Crosby Handicap.
