= Max Bell =

Canadian newspaper publisher (1911–1972)

- Born: George Maxwell Bell; October 13, 1911; Regina, Saskatchewan, Canada
- Died: July 19, 1972 (aged 60); Montreal, Quebec, Canada
- Occupations: Newspaper publisher; oil and gas executive; racehorse owner; philanthropist

George Maxwell Bell (October 13, 1911 – July 19, 1972) (Note: Birth date is according to his birth certificate. Several sources incorrectly cite his birth year as 1912.) was a Canadian newspaper publisher, race horse owner and philanthropist. He was best known as the co-founder of FP Publications, Canada's largest newspaper syndicate in the 1960s. He built his newspaper empire after inheriting the Calgary Albertan, and its $500,000 debt, from his father in 1936. He repaid the debt by 1945 and proceeded to purchase papers across the country, including the Ottawa Journal and The Globe and Mail. Much of Bell's fortune was built on Alberta's burgeoning oil and gas industry. He formed several companies in the late 1940s which came to be worth millions of dollars when sold.

Bell was a long time owner of thoroughbred race horses. He partnered with Frank McMahon to form two stables that won races across Canada, the United States and Europe. The pair joined with singer Bing Crosby to win the Irish Derby in 1965 while he and McMahon won the 1968 Queen's Plate. Bell was a part owner of several race tracks, including Balmoral Park, of which he became the first Canadian president. A noted philanthropist, he established the Max Bell Foundation shortly before his death, which has awarded millions of dollars in grants for medical, veterinary, sporting and educational causes.

== Early life ==
Bell was born October 13, 1911, in Regina, Saskatchewan. He was the son of George Melrose Bell and Edna Mae Parkin and had one brother, Gordon and two sisters, Audrey and Olive. His grandfather, George Alexander Bell, was a Canadian pioneer and Liberal minister in the Legislative Assembly of Saskatchewan. His father earned his fortune selling insurance and owned several newspapers and periodicals before losing much of his wealth investing in mining and oil.

Bell earned a degree in commerce from Montreal's McGill University during the Great Depression while working for his father at the Calgary Albertan newspaper during his summers. After graduating in 1932, Bell moved to British Columbia where he unsuccessfully attempted to prospect for gold in the Kootenays for a time and played two seasons of senior hockey with the Kimberley Dynamiters.

He met and married his first wife, Suzanne Staples, during this time and in 1935 returned to Calgary. He returned to the Albertan, earning $35 per week as the classified advertising manager. Bell inherited the paper upon his father's death in 1936, however the Albertan was under the control of the Royal Bank of Canada against $500,000 in loans that the elder Bell had made.

Additionally, Bell invested in an oil well near Turner Valley, Alberta. When the well struck oil in mid 1936, the income from his one percent share was double that of his newspaper salary.

In 1946, Canadian oilman Frank McMahon and Bell started Alberta Distillers Limited in Calgary, Alberta.

== Newspaper career ==
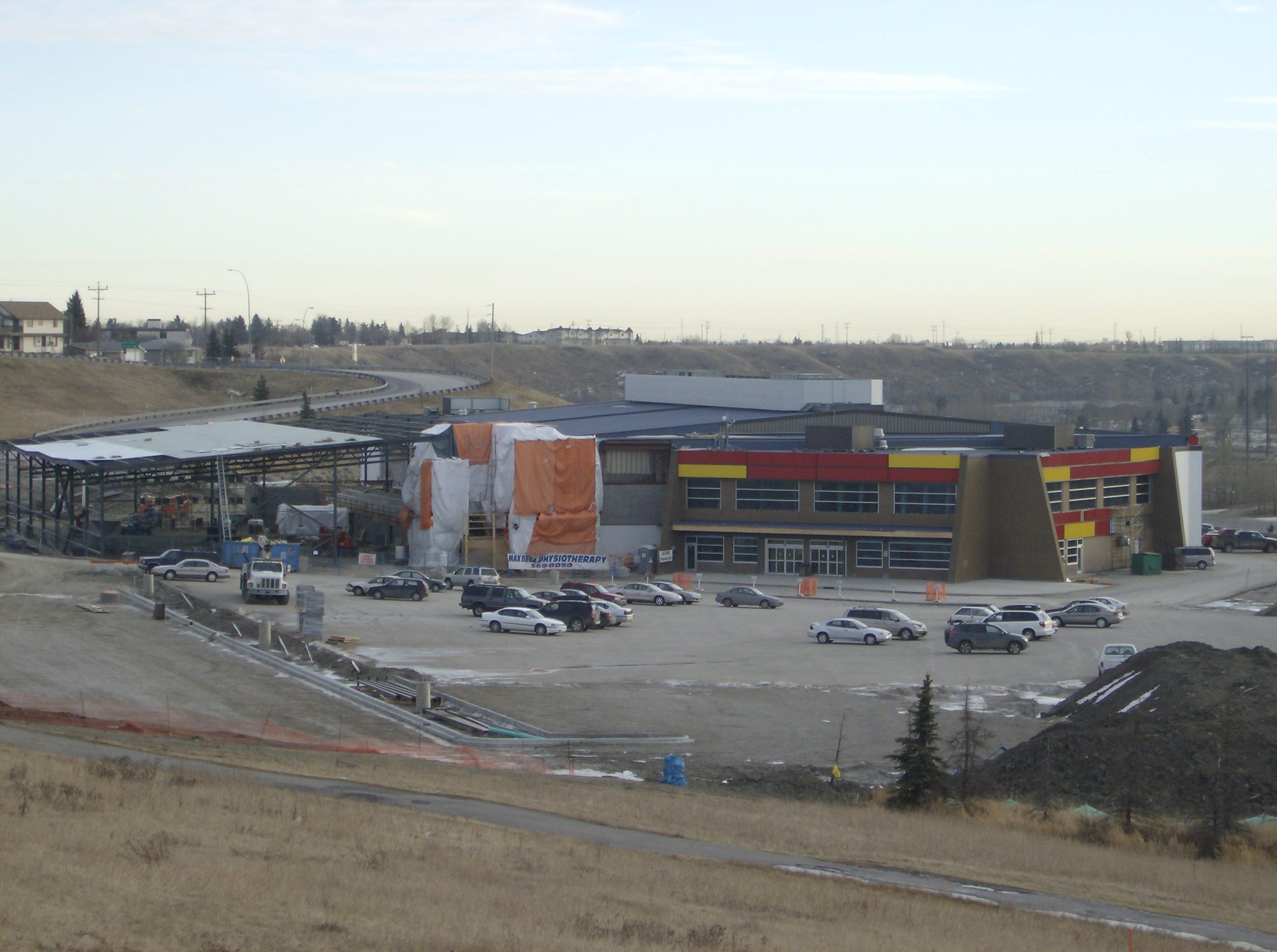
Max Bell Centre in Calgary, Alberta

Despite the oil strike, Bell continued to work for the Royal Bank at the Albertan. After seven years of what he called "clerking", he made a bid to regain his family's control of the paper. He convinced five friends in the oil and gas industry to form the Essex Company and put up $35,000 to operate the paper. He then convinced the Royal Bank to give him control, and in mid-1943, was made publisher of the Albertan. Under Bell's leadership, the paper returned to profitability, prompting the partners in Essex to raise his salary to $85 per week. Within three years, Bell was able to repay both his partners in Essex and purchase full control of the paper from the bank. Almost immediately after repaying his partners, Bell convinced them to purchase the Edmonton Bulletin. However, Bell lacked the capital to support the paper which was burdened with labour strife and aging equipment. He made the decision to fold the paper in 1951.

While he worked to regain control of the Albertan, Bell also continued to invest in oil ventures. In 1944 he partnered with Frank McMahon and others forming Empire Petroleum Limited, in an unsuccessful attempt to raise capital to drill a wildcat well. Two years later he tried again with two new companies, Reef Petroleum and Tower Petroleum. The two new companies also failed to find oil, but the efforts raised enough money for Bell and his partners to form Calvan Petroleums on the heels of Imperial Oil's discovery of a large oil field at Redwater, Alberta. The company found success trading in leases and drilling rights on crown land, prompting Bell to form several other oil companies in the years that followed. In 1951, Bell amalgamated his various companies into Calvan Consolidated Ltd. The new company held an interest in 77 wells at the Redwater field. He sold Calvan to Petrofina in 1955 for $40 million and, while he continued to trade in oil and gas companies for several years, his focus returned to the newspaper business.

Bell purchased the Victoria Times Colonist in 1959 for $750,000, and one year later built a plant to print both the Times and The Colonist, which he gained control of in 1953 for $1 million. In 1954, Bell acquired a controlling interest in the Lethbridge Herald. He had a habit of appearing unannounced at the offices of his papers, often to chat with the editors, though never told them what to print. Bell continued to acquire newspapers, joining with Victor Sifton, owner of the Winnipeg Free Press to purchase the Ottawa Journal in 1959. The pair combined their interests to form FP (Federated Paper) Publications Ltd. that same year. Bell purchased the Vancouver Sun in 1963, and Toronto's The Globe and Mail in 1965, making FP Publications Canada's largest newspaper syndicate. By 1972, the papers had a combined circulation of over 820,000.

Among acquisitions made outside the newspaper industry, Bell led a group that attempted to gain control of the Hudson's Bay Company in 1950. The bid was thought to have been motivated by the land and mineral rights that the company controlled, but was thwarted by company bylaws that prevented the transfer of such rights. It was later suggested Bell backed out of the deal in the belief the company would struggle to adapt to his ideas. By 1965, Bell was the largest single shareholder in Canadian Pacific Railway (CPR).

In addition to serving as a director for the CPR, Bell was also director for the Bank of Nova Scotia, a member of the board of governors of McGill University and was a senior director of the Calgary Exhibition and Stampede.

== Thoroughbred horse racing ==
A longtime thoroughbred horse racing enthusiast, Bell met future jockey Johnny Longden as a young man in Calgary, and later bought a horse from Longden, Mac Aurelius, whose victory in a Regina claiming race fueled Bell's interest in the sport. He invested in several ranches and was at least part-owner in three race tracks, including Balmoral Park, where he was the track's first Canadian president.

Bell partnered with Frank McMahon to form Golden West Farms near Okotoks, Alberta, and the pair joined with Vance Longden and Wilder Ripley in 1952 to form Alberta Ranches, Ltd., which raced in California. The stables won numerous races throughout North America, as well as England and Ireland. Among Bell and McMahon's biggest successes was Four-and-Twenty, whose victories included the 1961 Santa Anita Derby, and the Hollywood Derby.

Among his biggest victories, Bell won the 1965 Irish Derby with the colt Meadow Court, having sold one-third shares of ownership to McMahon and Bing Crosby just prior to the race. Meadow Court then won two more races before being retired to stud following the season. The horse, purchased by Bell for $9,000 won over $280,000 in purses before being sold for over $1.2 million. He and McMahon won the 1968 Queen's Plate with Merger.

Max Bell was inducted into the Canadian Horse Racing Hall of Fame in 1977.

== Personal life ==
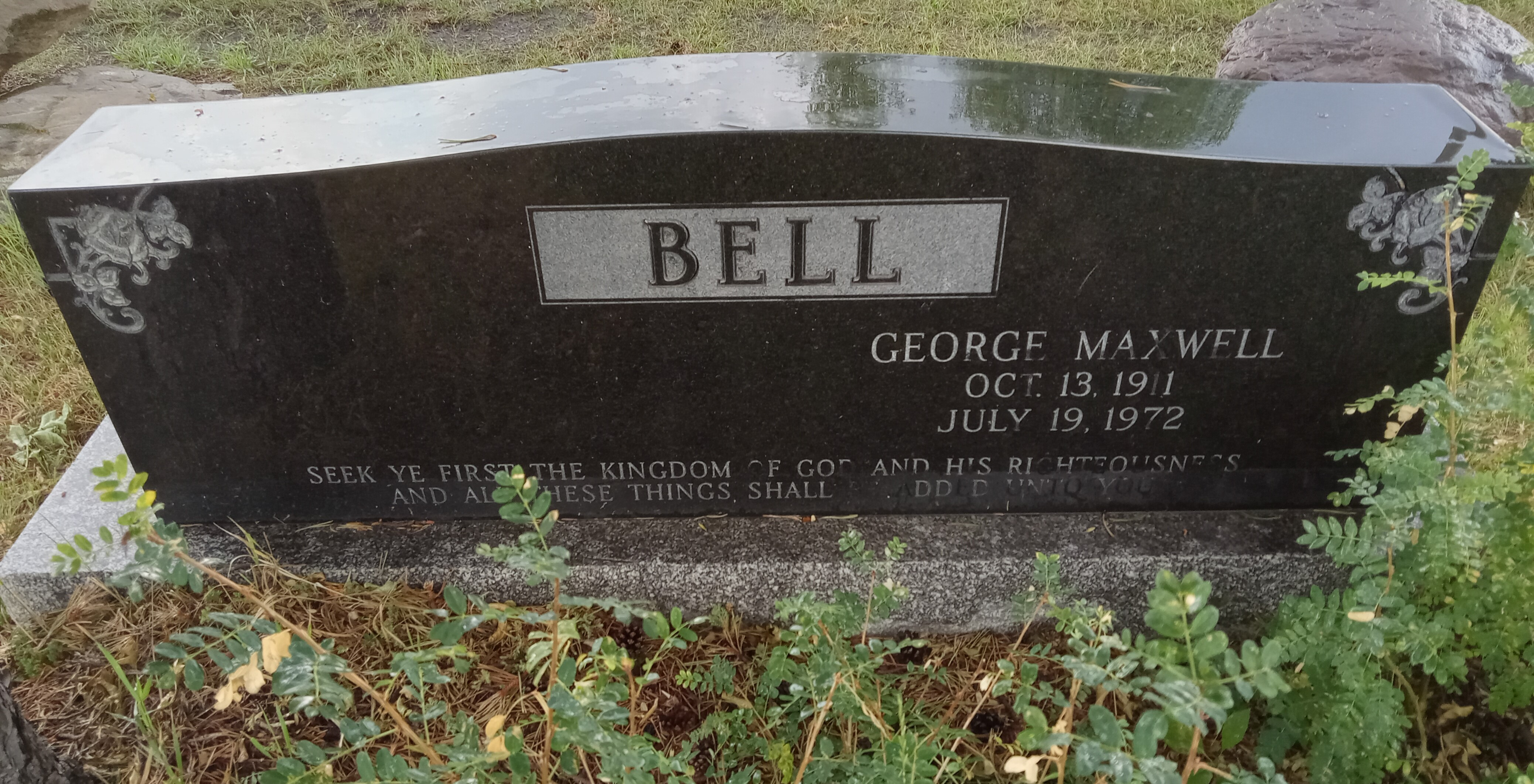
Bell's grave marker in Okotoks Cemetery

Bell's first marriage was to Suzanne de Nancrede Staples (1917–2001). Suzanne's sister Katharine was the wife of George L. McMahon. The Bells had four children: sons Chester (died 1970) and Paul, and daughters Diane and Gretchen. They divorced in 1949. In 1955 remarried to Agnes Eileen McKeown (1929–1999), who was widowed when her husband Frank McMahon Jr. was killed in an automobile accident in 1953. The family maintained a winter home in Palm Desert, California, and a ranch in Okotoks.

An ardent member of the Presbyterian Church, Bell was said to have read the Bible as often as his weekly horse racing forms. He neither drank nor smoked, and was a generous donor to his church. He enjoyed playing golf and badminton, and frequently sailed his yacht, Campana, throughout the area around Vancouver Island and used it to ferry politicians and businessmen to a special forum on Canadian-American relations which he organized in 1959. Bell was a supporter of organized sport at several levels and helped finance the Vancouver Canucks' entry into the National Hockey League. Bell was the original chairman of Hockey Canada when it was formed in 1968, as a separate entity from the Canadian Amateur Hockey Association.

Bell fell ill to a neurological illness in 1967 resulting in numerous surgeries over the following five years. He died on July 19, 1972, at the Montreal Neurological Institute. Shortly before his death, he created the Max Bell Foundation and funded it with $17 million of FP Publications stock. In 50 years, the foundation's assets had grown to $97 million in addition to over $97 million distributed as part of more than 500 grants across the nation. Capital grants have helped to fund several facilities throughout Canada, most notably in Calgary and Winnipeg. Thirty percent of the grants go to McGill University. Max Bell Foundation has funded charities in a variety of areas since its inception, and currently focuses its grants on health, environment, education, and democracy and civic engagement.
