= Strub Stakes =

Horse race in Arcadia, California, US

- Class: Grade II
- Location: Santa Anita Park; Arcadia, California, United States
- Inaugurated: 1948
- Race type: Thoroughbred - Flat racing
- Website: www.santaanita.com

Race information
- Distance: 1 1/8 miles (9 furlongs)
- Surface: Dirt
- Track: left-handed
- Qualification: Four-year-olds
- Weight: Assigned
- Purse: $200,000

The Strub Stakes is an American race for thoroughbred horses run at Santa Anita Park in Arcadia, California, each year.

Currently a Grade II stakes race with a purse of $200,000, it is for four-year-olds, at one and one-eighth miles on Santa Anita Park's dirt track. Run in early February, the race is the third leg of Santa Anita Park's Strub Series.

Inaugurated in 1948 as the Santa Anita Maturity, the name was changed to the Charles H. Strub Stakes in 1963 in honor of Charles H. Strub (1884–1958) who built and owned Santa Anita Park. In 1994 the billing was shortened to the Strub Stakes to honor both Dr. Strub and Dr. Strub's son, Robert P. Strub, who succeeded Dr. Strub as CEO at Santa Anita and had died the previous May.

From 1948 to 1969 and from 1971 to 1997 the race was contested at 1 1/4 miles.

== Records ==
Speed record:

- 1:47.25 - Mizzen Mast (2002)
- 1:57.80 - Spectacular Bid (1980 at 1 1/4 miles)

Most wins by a jockey:

- 7 - Bill Shoemaker (1951, 1961, 1964, 1966, 1972, 1975, 1980)

Most wins by a trainer:

- 5 - Bob Baffert (1998, 2000, 2001, 2013, 2014)

Most wins by an owner:

- 3 - Golden Eagle Farm (1992, 1999, 2000)

== Winners ==
Year	Winner	Jockey	Trainer	Owner	Time
2014	Shakin It Up	Mike E. Smith	Bob Baffert	Cardoza/Pegram	1:41.86
2013	Guilt Trip	Joseph Talamo	Bob Baffert	Gary & Mary West	1:48.97
2012	Ultimate Eagle	Martin Pedroza	Michael Pender	B.J. Wright	1:47.08
2011	Twirling Candy	Joel Rosario	John W. Sadler	Craig Family Trust	1:46.53
2010	Jeranimo	Martin Garcia	Michael Pender	B.J. Wright	1:47.83
2009	Cowboy Cal	John Velazquez	Todd Pletcher	Robert and Janice McNair	1:48.22
2008	Monterey Jazz	David Flores	Craig Dollase	A&R Stables/Class Stable	1:45.65
2007	Arson Squad	Garrett Gomez	Bruce Headley	Jay Em Ess Stable	1:48.65
2006	High Limit	Pat Valenzuela	Robert J. Frankel	Gary & Mary West Stables	1:49.14
2005	Rock Hard Ten	Gary Stevens	Richard Mandella	Mercedes Stable/M. Paulson	1:49.24
2004	Domestic Dispute	Kent Desormeaux	Paddy Gallagher	Bienstock & Winner	1:49.08
2003	Medaglia d'Oro	Jerry Bailey	Robert J. Frankel	Edmund A. Gann	1:48.04
2002	Mizzen Mast	Kent Desormeaux	Robert J. Frankel	Juddmonte Farms	1:47.25
2001	Wooden Phone	Corey Nakatani	Bob Baffert	Durant Helzer & Helzer	1:48.43
2000	General Challenge	Corey Nakatani	Bob Baffert	Golden Eagle Farm	1:48.81
1999	Event of the Year	Corey Nakatani	Richard Mandella	Golden Eagle Farm	1:47.65
1998	Silver Charm	Gary Stevens	Bob Baffert	Bob & Beverly Lewis	1:47.27
1997	Victory Speech	Jerry D. Bailey	D. Wayne Lukas	Sue Magnier/Michael Tabor	2:01.50
1996	Helmsman	Chris McCarron	Wallace Dollase	Horizon Stable, et al.	2:02.76
1995	Dare And Go	Alex Solis	Richard Mandella	La Presle Farm	2:00.15
1994	Diazo	Laffit Pincay Jr.	Bill Shoemaker	Allen E. Paulson	2:00.33
1993	Siberian Summer	Corey Nakatani	Ronald McAnally	Buckram Oak Farm	2:00.78
1992	Best Pal	Kent Desormeaux	Gary F. Jones	Golden Eagle Farm	1:59.95
1991	Defensive Play	José A. Santos	C. R. McGaughey III	Juddmonte Farms	2:00.80
1990	Flying Continental	Corey Black	Jay M. Robbins	Jack Kent Cooke	2:01.40
1989	Nasr El Arab	Pat Valenzuela	Charlie Whittingham	Sheikh Mohammed	2:02.20
1988	Alysheba	Chris McCarron	Jack Van Berg	Dorothy & Pam Scharbauer	2:00.40
1987	Snow Chief	Pat Valenzuela	Melvin F. Stute	Grinstead & Rochelle	2:00.00
1986	Nostalgia's Star	Fernando Toro	Jay M. Robbins	Duckett, Hinds & Robbins	2:03.60
1985	Precisionist	Chris McCarron	L. R. Fenstermaker	Fred W. Hooper	2:00.20
1984	Desert Wine	Ed Delahoussaye	Jerry M. Fanning	Cardiff Stud Farm/T90 Ranch	2:02.20
1983	Swing Till Dawn	Pat Valenzuela	Charles Marikian	Paniolo Ranch, et al.	2:02.00
1982	It's the One	Walter Guerra	Laz Barrera	Amin Saiden	2:00.40
1981	Super Moment	Fernando Toro	Ronald McAnally	Elmendorf Farm	2:01.20
1980	Spectacular Bid	Bill Shoemaker	Bud Delp	Hawksworth Farm	1:57.80
1979	Affirmed	Laffit Pincay Jr.	Laz Barrera	Harbor View Farm	2:01.00
1978	Mr. Redoy	Darrel McHargue	A. Thomas Doyle	Felty J. Yoder	2:01.00
1977	Kirby Lane	Sandy Hawley	Laz Barrera	Gedney Farms	2:00.40
1976	George Navonod	Fernando Toro	Gordon Campbell	Navonod Stable	2:12.00
1975	Stardust Mel	Bill Shoemaker	Charlie Whittingham	Marjorie L. Everett	2:04.20
1974	Ancient Title	Laffit Pincay Jr.	Keith Stucki Sr.	Ethel Kirkland	2:00.80
1973	Royal Owl	Johnny Sellers	John G. Canty	Royal Oaks Farm/Owl Stable	2:04.00
1972	Unconscious	Bill Shoemaker	John G. Canty	Arthur A. Seeligson Jr.	2:00.40
1971	War Heim	Johnny Sellers	Dale Landers	Hazel Huffman	2:00.60
1970	Snow Sporting	Laffit Pincay Jr.	Warren Stute	Clement L. Hirsch	1:48.80
1969	Dignitas †	Fernando Alvarez	James W. Maloney	William H. Perry	2:02.00
1968	Most Host	William Harmatz	Gene Cleveland	Mmes. Bishop-Robbins	2:04.00
1967	Drin	Laffit Pincay Jr.	Charlie Whittingham	Howard B. Keck	2:02.00
1966	Bold Bidder	Bill Shoemaker	Randy Sechrest	John R. Gaines (lessee)	1:59.60
1965	Duel	Manuel Ycaza	James W. Maloney	Claiborne Farm	2:00.60
1964	Gun Bow	Bill Shoemaker	Edward A. Neloy	Gedney Farms	1:59.80
1963	Crimson Satan	Herb Hinojosa	J. W. King	Crimson King Farm	2:00.60
1962	Four-and-Twenty	Johnny Longden	Vance Longden	Alberta Ranches, Ltd.	2:01.00
1961	Prove It	Bill Shoemaker	Mesh Tenney	Rex C. Ellsworth	2:01.00
1960	First Landing	Eddie Arcaro	Casey Hayes	Meadow Stable	2:00.60
1959	Hillsdale	Tommy Barrow	Martin L. Fallon	C. W. Smith Enterprises	2:02.40
1958	Round Table	William Harmatz	William Molter	Kerr Stable	2:01.80
1957	Spinney	William Harmatz	Reggie Cornell	Louis R. Rowan	2:04.80
1956	Trackmaster	Ralph Neves	Ted Saladin	M/M Hal Seley	2:04.80
1955	Determine †	Raymond York	William Molter	Andrew J. Crevolin	2:00.40
1954	Apple Valley	Merlin Volzke	Robert H. McDaniel	Mrs. A. W. Ryan	2:08.00
1953	Mark-Ye-Well	Eddie Arcaro	Horace A. Jones	Calumet Farm	2:03.40
1952	Intent	Eddie Arcaro	William J. Hirsch	Brookfield Farm	2:02.80
1951	Great Circle	Bill Shoemaker	Warren Stute	Yolo Stable	2:00.40
1950	Ponder	Steve Brooks	Horace A. Jones	Calumet Farm	2:02.40
1949	Ace Admiral	John Gilbert	William Molter	Maine Chance Farm	2:02.20
1948	Flashco	Jack Westrope	George Reeves	F. Frankel	2:03.20

* † Miz Clementine (1955) and Nodouble (1969) both finished first but after a stewards' inquiry were disqualified to second place.
