= Merger (horse) =

Canadian-bred Thoroughbred racehorse

- Sire: Prince d'Amour
- Grandsire: Tantieme
- Dam: Anglirish
- Damsire: Ballyogan
- Sex: Stallion
- Foaled: 1965
- Country: Canada
- Colour: Bay
- Breeder: Golden West Farms
- Owner: Golden West Farms
- Trainer: Roy Johnson
- Record: 9: 5-?-?
- Earnings: $67,280

Major wins
- Plate Trial Stakes (1968) Canadian Classic Race wins: Queen's Plate (1968)

Merger (foaled 1965 in Alberta) is a Canadian Thoroughbred racehorse best known for winning the 1968 Queen's Plate, Canada's most prestigious horse race.

Merger was bred and raced by Golden West Farms, a partnership of prominent Canadian businessmen, Frank McMahon and Max Bell.
