= Triple Bend =

American-bred Thoroughbred racehorse

- Sire: Never Bend
- Grandsire: Nasrullah
- Dam: Triple Orbit
- Damsire: Gunshot
- Sex: Stallion
- Foaled: March 20, 1968
- Country: United States
- Colour: Dark Bay/Brown
- Breeder: Leslie Combs II
- Owner: Frank McMahon
- Trainer: Vance Longden (West Coast); William J. Hirsch (East Coast)
- Record: 29: 10-6-5
- Earnings: $366,760

Major wins
- Contra Costa Stakes (1971); Los Angeles Handicap (1972); Santa Anita Handicap (1972); San Fernando Stakes (1972); Vosburgh Stakes (1972)

Honours
- Triple Bend Handicap at Hollywood Park Racetrack

Triple Bend (March 20, 1968 – January 31, 1995) was an American Thoroughbred racehorse who set a world record time of 119.80 for seven furlongs on dirt in winning the 1972 Los Angeles Handicap.

== Background ==
Bred by Leslie Combs II, Triple Bend was sold at the 1969 Keeneland summer yearling sales for $100,000 to Vancouver industrialist Frank McMahon, the owner of Majestic Prince who won that year's Kentucky Derby and Preakness Stakes. Soon after McMahon purchased Triple Bend, while on a farm he became caught in a fence and his struggles left him partially paralyzed and his euthanasia became a possibility. Nursed back to health, Triple Bend raced once as a juvenile in 1970.

== Racing career ==
Under trainer Vance Longden, in 1971 his best results included a win in the Contra Costa Stakes plus four second-place finishes in other stakes races. A rapidly improving horse at age four, in 1972 Triple Bend ran second to Unconscious in the Strub Stakes then beat him in winning California's richest and most prestigious race, the Santa Anita Handicap. Triple Bend dead heated with Autobiography for first in the San Fernando Stakes and in winning the Los Angeles Handicap at Hollywood Park Racetrack, set a world record time of 119.80 for seven furlongs. In the late fall, Triple Bend won the Vosburgh Stakes at Aqueduct Race Track in the New York City borough of Queens.

== Stud record ==
Retired to stud duty, Triple Bend's progeny met with only modest racing success. He died on January 31, 1995, at the age of twenty-seven. He was standing at stud at Jackson Farm, owned by Gary L. and Christine Jackson, in Yakima, Washington.

== Honors ==
In 1979, Hollywood Park Racetrack renamed the Lakes And Flowers Handicap in honor of Triple Bend. Since 2004, the Triple Bend Handicap has been a Grade 1 event.
