= Hill Rise =

American-bred Thoroughbred racehorse

- Sire: Hillary
- Grandsire: Khaled
- Dam: Red Curtain
- Damsire: Russia
- Sex: Stallion
- Foaled: 1961
- Country: USA
- Colour: Bay
- Breeder: George A. Pope Jr.
- Owner: El Peco Ranch
- Trainer: William B. Finnegan; Noel Murless (in England)
- Record: 43: 15-8-6
- Earnings: $653,160

Major wins
- California Breeders' Champion Stakes (1963); San Felipe Stakes (1964); Santa Anita Derby (1964); Forerunner Stakes (1964); Derby Trial (1964); Man O' War Stakes (1965); Santa Anita Handicap (1965); San Fernando Stakes (1965); San Antonio Handicap (1966); Queen Elizabeth II Stakes (1966)

Awards
- United Kingdom Champion Miler (1966)

Honours
- Hill Rise Stakes at Santa Anita Park

Hill Rise (1961–1982) was an American-bred Thoroughbred Champion racehorse. After winning several races in the United States, he was relocated to Britain, where he won the Queen Elizabeth II Stakes at Ascot Racecourse in 1966.

== Background ==
Hill Rise was bred at El Peco Ranch in Madera, California by George A. Pope Jr. (1901–1979), who also owned and bred 1962 Kentucky Derby winner Decidedly.

== Races and wins ==
The winner of California Breeders' Champion Stakes at age two, in his three-year-old campaign Hill Rise scored the widest margin of victory in the fastest Santa Anita Derby ever run and won 8 straight starts going into the 1964 Kentucky Derby.

For the Derby, trainer Horatio Luro, who had trained Decidedly, offered Bill Shoemaker the chance to ride his colt Northern Dancer. However, the future Hall of Fame jockey chose to ride the favored Hill Rise instead and wound up 2nd in the Derby and 3rd in the Preakness Stakes to Northern Dancer.

At age four, Hill Rise won the Man O' War Stakes on grass. The following year, after racing in the U.S. and winning the San Antonio Handicap, he was sent to race on the grass in England. Of his four races there, he won the Rous Memorial Stakes and the Queen Elizabeth II Stakes at Ascot Racecourse. His victory made him the first California-bred horse to win a major stakes in the United Kingdom since 1908. The effort earned Hill Rise 1966 Champion Miler honors in the UK.
