= Hollywood Derby =

- Class: Grade I
- Location: Del Mar racetrack (2014–present); Hollywood Park Racetrack (1938–2013)
- Inaugurated: 1938
- Race type: Thoroughbred – Flat racing
- Website: www.dmtc.com

Race information
- Distance: 1 1/8 miles (9.0 furlongs; 1.8 km)
- Surface: Turf
- Track: left-handed
- Qualification: Three-year-olds
- Weight: 122 lbs.
- Purse: $400,000 (2021)

The Hollywood Derby is a Grade I American Thoroughbred horse race held annually in late November/early December. Now held at Del Mar racetrack in San Diego, California, until 2014 it was held at Hollywood Park Racetrack in Inglewood, California. The race is open to horses aged three and contested at a mile and an eighth on turf. It currently offers a purse of $300,000.

Inaugurated in 1938, the race has been a Grade I event since 1973 when grading was first introduced. There was no race from 1942 through 1944 as a result of World War II and it was not run in 2005 as a safety precaution after new grass had been planted on the turf course. It was contested in two divisions from 1981 through 1987.

Known as the Westerner Stakes from 1948 to 1958, the race was held at Santa Anita Park in 1949 after a fire destroyed the Hollywood Park grandstand and clubhouse. When Hollywood Park closed in December 2013, the race was transferred to Del Mar. Due to the layout of the turf course at Del Mar, the race was shortened to 1 1/8 miles (1.8 km).

Only five fillies have ever won the race: Busher (1945), Honeymoon (1946), A Gleam (1952), De La Rose (1981) and Royal Heroine (1983).

In 2014, California Chrome accomplished a rare feat when, having won the Santa Anita Derby, Kentucky Derby and Preakness Stakes on dirt earlier in the year, he won the Hollywood Derby in his first appearance on the turf.

The Hollywood Derby has been contested at various distances on both dirt and turf:

- 1 1/8 miles (1.8 km) on dirt : 1945, 1950, 1976–1980
- 1 1/4 miles (2.0 km) on dirt : 1938–1941, 1946–1949, 1951–1972
- 1 1/2 miles (2.4 km) on turf : 1973–1975
- 1 1/8 miles (1.8 km) on turf : 1981–2002
- 1 1/4 miles (2.0 km) on turf : 2003 to 2013
- 1 1/8 miles (1.8 km) on turf: 2014 to present

== Records ==
Speed record: on turf

- 1:45.82 – Super Quercus (1999) (at current distance of 1 1/8 miles (1.8 km))
- 1:59.35 – Showing Up (2006) (at previous distance of 1 1/4 miles (2.0 km))
- 2:27.80 – Amen II (1973) (at previous distance of 1 1/2 miles (2.4 km))

Speed record: on dirt

- 1:59.40 – Count of Honor (1956) (at 1 1/4 miles (2.0 km))
- 1:47.40 – Codex (1980) (at 1 1/8 miles (1.8 km))

Most wins by a jockey:

- 8 – Bill Shoemaker (1951, 1955, 1957, 1958, 1974, 1976, 1982, 1986)

Most wins by a trainer:

- 5 – Chad C. Brown (2016, 2018, 2020, 2023, 2025)

Most wins by an Owner:

- 4 – Klaravich Stables (1997, 2016, 2020, 2023)

== Winners ==
Year	Winner	Age	Jockey	Trainer	Owner	Dist. (Miles)	Time	Win$	Gr.
2025	Salamis	3	Umberto Rispoli	Chad C. Brown	Juddmonte Farms	1 1/8	1:50.74	$301,500	G1
2024	Formidable Man	3	Umberto Rispoli	Michael W. McCarthy	Warren, Jr., William K. and Warren, Suzanne	1 1/8	1:48.40	$180,000	G1
2023	Program Trading (GB)	3	Flavien Prat	Chad C. Brown	Klaravich Stables	11/8	1:47.82	$180,000	G1
2022	Speaking Scout	3	Juan J. Hernandez	H. Graham Motion	Eclipse Thoroughbred Partners	11/8	1:49.34	$240,000	G1
2021	Beyond Brilliant	3	Kent Desormeaux	John Shirreffs	C R K Stable	11/8	1:48.84	$240,000	G1
2020	Domestic Spending (GB)	3	Irad Ortiz, Jr.	Chad C. Brown	Klaravich Stables	11/8	1:47.15	$180,000	G1
2019	Mo Forza	3	Paco Lopez	Peter Miller	OG Boss & Bardy Farm (Barry & Dyan Abrams)	11/8	1:48.57	$180,000	G1
2018	Raging Bull	3	Joel Rosario	Chad C. Brown	Peter M. Brant	11/8	1:48.34	$180,000	G1
2017	Mo Town	3	John R. Velazquez	Anthony Dutrow	Susan Magnier, Michael Tabor, Derrick Smith	11/8	1:46.36	$180,000	G1
2016	Annals of Time	3	Javier Castellano	Chad C. Brown	Klaravich Stables & William Lawrence	11/8	1:47.73	$180,000	G1
2015	Chiropractor	3	Corey Nakatani	Thomas F. Proctor	Glen Hill Farm	11/8	1:48.87	$180,000	G1
2014	California Chrome	3	Victor Espinoza	Art Sherman	DAP Racing	11/8	1:47.88	$180,000	G1
2013	Seek Again	3	Corey Nakatani	John Gosden	Juddmonte Farms	11/4	2:00.60	$180,000	G1
2012	Unbridled Command	3	Javier Castellano	Thomas M. Bush	Lewis G. Lakin	11/4	2:01.07	$150,000	G1
2011	Ultimate Eagle	3	Martin Pedroza	Michael Pender	Robert "B. J." Wright	11/4	2:01.43	$150,000	G1
2010	Haimish Hy	3	Garrett Gomez	Art Sherman	Sherman/Akin/Franco/Goldstein	11/4	2:01.20	$150,000	G1
2009	The Usual Q.T.	3	Victor Espinoza	James M. Cassidy	Van Kempen & partners	11/4	1:59.69	$180,000	G1
2008	Court Vision	3	Ramon Domínguez	William I. Mott	IEAH Stables & WinStar Farm	11/4	2:01.43	$300,000	G1
2007	Daytona	3	Mike E. Smith	Dan Hendricks	Jeff Davenport, Tom Lenner, Jess Ravich, Thomas Murray	11/4	1:59.75	$300,000	G1
2006	Showing Up	3	Cornelio Velásquez	Barclay Tagg	Lael Stables	11/4	1:59.35	$300,000	G1
2005	Race not held								
2004	Good Reward	3	Jerry Bailey	C. R. McGaughey III	Ogden Mills Phipps	11/4	2:01.53	$300,000	G1
2003	Sweet Return	3	Julie Krone	Ron McAnally	Red Oak Stable (John J. Brunetti)	11/4	2:04.27	$360,000	G1
2002	Johar	3	Alex Solis	Richard Mandella	The Thoroughbred Corp.	11/8	1:48.70	$300,000	G1
2001	Denon	3	Chris McCarron	Robert J. Frankel	Flaxman Holdings	11/8	1:49.28	$300,000	G1
2000	Brahms	3	Pat Day	W. Elliott Walden	Tom VanMeter II	11/8	1:46.73	$300,000	G1
1999	Super Quercus	3	Alex Solis	Robert J. Frankel	3 Plus U Stable	11/8	1:45.82	$300,000	G1
1998	Vergennes	3	John R. Velazquez	Steve Asmussen	Gary A. Tanaka	11/8	1:49.44	$300,000	G1
1997	Subordination	3	Jerry Bailey	Gary Sciacca	Klaravich Stables	11/8	1:50.00	$300,000	G1
1996	Marlin	3	Corey Nakatani	D. Wayne Lukas	Michael Tabor	11/8	1:46.08	$300,000	G1
1995	Labeeb	3	Ed Delahoussaye	Neil D. Drysdale	Sheikh Mohammed	11/8	1:46.42	$240,000	G1
1994	River Flyer	3	Chris Antley	David Hofmans	Gary Folgner	11/8	1:47.48	$240,000	G1
1993	Explosive Red	3	Corey Nakatani	Daniel J. Vella	Frank Stronach	11/8	1:46.88	$240,000	G1
1992	Paradise Creek	3	Pat Day	William I. Mott	Bertram R. Firestone	11/8	1:47.36	$240,000	G1
1991-1	Eternity Star	3	Ed Delahoussaye	Robert J. Frankel	Peter Wall	11/8	1:47.30	$240,000	G1
1991-2	Olympio	3	Ed Delahoussaye	Ron McAnally	V.H.W. Stables	11/8	1:47.10	$240,000	G1
1990	Itsallgreektome	3	Corey Nakatani	Wallace Dollase	Jhayare Stables	11/8	1:46.60	$240,000	G1
1989	Live The Dream	3	Alex Solis	Charles E. Whittingham	Mary Bradley & Nancy Chandler	11/8	1:47.00	$240,000	G1
1988	Silver Circus	3	Gary Stevens	Julio Canani	Joseph M. Scardino	11/8	1:48.40	$120,000	G1
1987-1	Political Ambition	3	Jacinto Vásquez	Neil D. Drysdale	Clover Racing Stable	11/8	1:48.20	$101,600	G1
1987-2	Stately Don	3	Eddie Delahoussaye	LeRoy Jolley	Bradley M. Shannon	11/8	1:47.40	$104,600	G1
1986-1	Thrill Show	3	Ray Sibille	Charles E. Whittingham	Mary Bradley, Richard Duchossois, C. E. Whittingham	11/8	1:46.80	$146,000	G1
1986-2	Spellbound	3	Bill Shoemaker	Paul H. Murphy	Edward Brennan	11/8	1:46.80	$147,000	G1
1985-1	Charming Duke	3	Jorge Velásquez	Jean-Pierre Dupuis	Greenhorn Stable	11/8	1:46.80	$171,225	G1
1985-2	Slew The Dragon	3	Yves Saint-Martin	John O. Hertler	Mickey Taylor & Dr. Jim Hill, et al.	11/8	1:46.40	$168,725	G1
1984-1	Procida	3	Cash Asmussen	François Boutin	Stavros Niarchos	11/8	1:48.40	$139,250	G1
1984-2	Foscarini	3	Darrel McHargue	Laurie N. Anderson	J. Carlisle & J. Sheridan	11/8	1:47.40	$140,750	G1
1983-1	Royal Heroine	3	Fernando Toro	John Gosden	Robert Sangster	11/8	1:48.20	$87,400	G1
1983-2	Ginger Brink	3	Fernando Toro	Ted West Sr.	David Sofro	11/8	1:49.20	$86,400	G1
1982-1	Racing Is Fun	3	Bill Shoemaker	Roger E. Clapp	Connie M. Ring	11/8	1:47.20	$70,150	G1
1982-2	Victory Zone	3	Eddie Delahoussaye	Robert J. Frankel	Honeybee Farm	11/8	1:47.80	$70,150	G1
1981-1	De La Rose	3	Eddie Maple	Woody Stephens	Henryk de Kwiatkowski	11/8	1:47.60	$68,700	G1
1981-2	Silveyville	3	Danny Winick	Emmett L. Campbell	Kjell Qvale	11/8	1:48.20	$68,700	G1
1980	Codex	3	Eddie Delahoussaye	D. Wayne Lukas	Tartan Stable	11/8	1:47.40	$195,250	G1
1979	Flying Paster	3	Donald Pierce	Gordon C. Campbell	Bernard J. Ridder	11/8	1:47.60	$166,750	G1
1978	Affirmed	3	Steve Cauthen	Laz Barrera	Harbor View Farm	11/8	1:48.20	$174,750	G1
1977	Steve's Friend	3	Ruben Hernandez	John W. Fulton	Kinsman Stable	11/8	1:47.80	$140,000	G1
1976	Crystal Water	3	Bill Shoemaker	Roger E. Clapp	Connie M. Ring	11/8	1:48.40	$157,750	G1
1975	Intrepid Hero	3	Donald Pierce	John W. Russell	Ogden Phipps	11/2	2:29.00	$90,000	G1
1974	Agitate	3	Bill Shoemaker	James Jimenez	Meeken Stable (John & Paula Kent Meeken)	11/2	2:28.20	$90,000	G1
1973	Amen II	3	Eddie Belmonte	Philip G. Johnson	Dee-Bee Stable	11/2	2:27.80	$90,000	G1
1972	Riva Ridge	3	Ron Turcotte	Lucien Laurin	Meadow Stable	11/4	1:59.60	$59,900	
1971	Bold Reason	3	Laffit Pincay Jr.	Angel Penna Sr.	William A. Levin	11/4	2:01.00	$61,200	
1970	Hanalei Bay	3	Merlin Volzke	Robert K. Miller	Robert K. Miller	11/4	2:01.20	$73,200	
1969	Tell	3	Donald Pierce	Charles E. Whittingham	Elizabeth A. Keck	11/4	2:00.00	$76,600	
1968	Poleax	3	Bill Hartack	Joseph S. Dunn	William R. Hawn	11/4	1:59.80	$82,000	
1967	Tumble Wind	3	Johnny Sellers	Charles E. Whittingham	Rock Spring & Llangollen Farm Stable	11/4	2:00.20	$72,900	
1966	Fleet Host	3	Jerry Lambert	Raymond Priddy	Westerly Stud	11/4	2:00.40	$75,500	
1965	Terry's Secret	3	Alex Maese	Carl A. Roles	Poltex Stable	11/4	2:00.80	$80,200	
1964	Real Good Deal	3	Johnny Longden	T. R. Scott	Ellwood B. & Betty Johnston	11/4	2:00.80	$71,100	
1963	Y Flash	3	Eddie Burns	Jess Byrd	J. Kell Houssels	11/4	2:00.60	$79,000	
1962	Drill Site	3	Ralph Neves	John Adams	Ralph Lowe	11/4	2:00.00	$68,900	
1961	Four-and-Twenty	3	Johnny Longden	Vance Longden	Alberta Ranches, Ltd.	11/4	2:00.60	$77,900	
1960	Tempestuous	3	Peter Moreno	Matthew J. Dragna	Joe Dragna & Dr. S. E. Santoro	11/4	2:01.40	$68,700	
1959	Bagdad	3	Bill Shoemaker	Joseph S. Dunn	Howard B. Keck	11/4	1:59.60	$65,900	
1958	Strong Bay	3	Manuel Ycaza	Jack Williams	Mr. & Mrs. Ray Camp	11/4	2:02.60	$70,800	
1957	Round Table	3	Bill Shoemaker	William Molter	Kerr Stable	11/4	2:00.60	$69,300	
1956	Count of Honor	3	Eddie Arcaro	Buster Millerick	Robert Lehman	11/4	1:59.40	$48,950	
1955	Swaps	3	Bill Shoemaker	Mesh Tenney	Rex Ellsworth	11/4	2:00.60	$34,700	
1954	Fault Free	3	Ralph Neves	Ronald H. McClellan	Mrs. A. W. Ryan	11/4	2:00.80	$32,850	
1953	Rejected	3	Ralph Neves	William J. Hirsch	King Ranch	11/4	2:01.40	$64,500	
1952	A Gleam	3	Henry E. Moreno	Horace A. Jones	Calumet Farm	11/4	2:01.20	$36,550	
1951	Grantor	3	Bill Shoemaker	Harry L. Daniels	William Goetz	11/4	2:01.80	$33,600	
1950	Valquest	3	Jack Westrope	George E. Mayberry	Andrew J. Crevolin	11/8	1:49.00	$17,200	
1949	Pedigree	3	Johnny Longden	William Molter	C. H. Jones & Son	11/4	2:03.00	$42,900	
1948	Solidarity	3	Johnny Longden	William Molter	Mrs. Nat Goldstone	11/4	2:02.60	$33,300	
1947	Yankee Valor	3	Noel Richardson	Paul L. Lycan	Col. L. G. Burns	11/4	2:01.80	$36,000	
1946	Honeymoon	3	Jack Westrope	Graceton W. Philpot	Louis B. Mayer	11/4	2:02.00	$39,300	
1945	Busher	3	Johnny Longden	George M. Odom	Louis B. Mayer	11/8	1:50.20	$40,470	
1942	– 1944	Race not held							
1941	Staretor	3	George Woolf	George H. Strate	Hugh S. Nesbitt	11/4	2:03.20	$19,675	
1940	Big Flash	3	Eugene Rodriguez	Clyde Phillips	Thomas D. Taggart	11/4	2:03.60	$18,750	
1939	Shining One	3	Jack Westrope	William B. Finnegan	Edward S. Moore	11/4	2:03.80	$18,275	
1938	Specify	3	John Adams	Albert A. Baroni	Albert A. Baroni	11/4	2:04.40	$11,900	

* In 2001, Designed for Luck won but was disqualified for drifting out in the stretch and was set back to fifth.
