= Ray York =

American jockey (1933–2020)

Raymond York
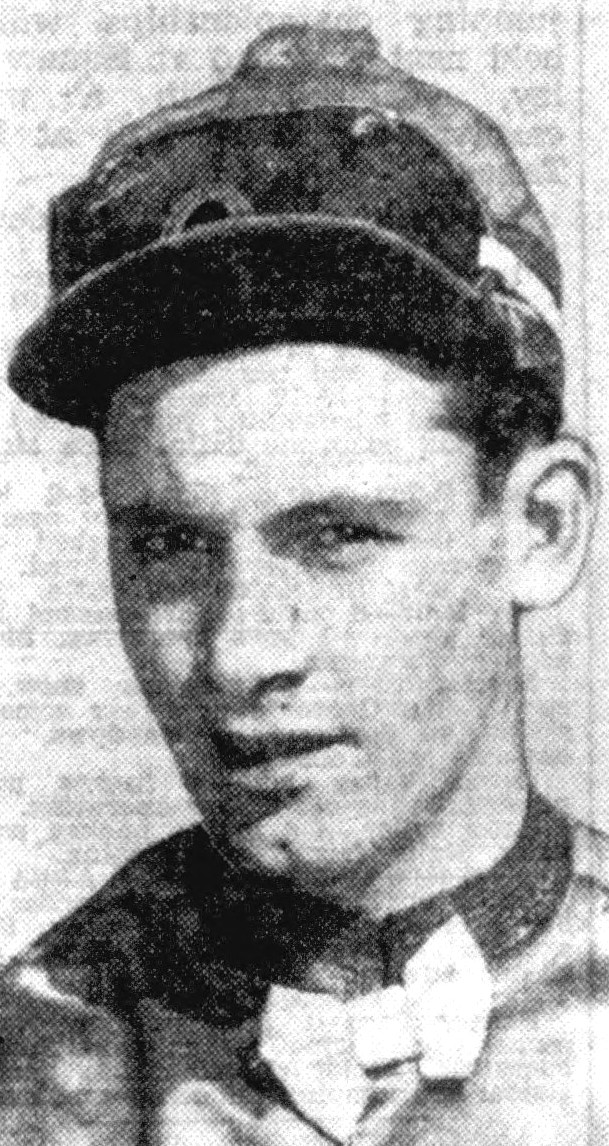
- York, circa 1951

Personal information
- Born: November 23, 1933 Gloucester, Massachusetts, U.S.
- Died: February 23, 2020 (aged 86) near Bakersfield, California, U.S.
- Occupation: Jockey

Horse racing career
- Sport: Horse racing
- Career wins: 3,082

Major racing wins
- San Felipe Stakes (1951, 1954); Gazelle Handicapo (1952); Malibu Stakes (1952, 1954, 1955, 1963); San Antonio Handicap (1952); Schuylerville Stakes (1952); Test Stakes (1952); Withers Stakes (1952); Bing Crosby Handicap (1953, 1957, 1962); Santa Anita Derby (1954, 1959); San Gabriel Handicap (1954); San Juan Capistrano Handicap (1954); San Luis Rey Handicap (1954, 1958); Del Mar Debutante Stakes (1955, 1958, 1964); Del Mar Futurity (1955, 1961); Hollywood Lassie Stakes (1955, 1958); Hollywood Oaks (1955, 1957); Strub Stakes (1955); Santa Monica Handicap (1958); San Luis Obispo Handicap (1959); Santa Ynez Stakes (1959); Saratoga Special Stakes (1960); Sheepshead Bay Handicap (1960); Firenze Handicap (1960); Ramona Handicap (1962, 1964); Santa Catalina Handicap (1963); Hollywood Gold Cup (1964) American Classic Race wins: Kentucky Derby (1954)

Honors
- George Woolf Memorial Jockey Award (1955)

Significant horses
- Determine, Silver Spoon, Colorado King

Raymond York (November 23, 1933 – February 23, 2020) was an American Thoroughbred horse racing jockey who rode in a record seven consecutive decades.

During his long career, Ray York rode primarily in California where he won the 1964 Hollywood Gold Cup and twice won the West Coast's most important race for three-year-old horses, the Santa Anita Derby. He also won important Graded stakes races at New York State tracks including the 1952 edition of the Withers Stakes.

In 1954, Ray York earned the most significant win of his career when he rode Determine to victory in the Kentucky Derby. In his only appearance in the Preakness Stakes, in 1952 York rode Armageddon to a tenth place showing. In 1955 he was voted the George Woolf Memorial Jockey Award in recognition of his racing success accomplished with a high standard of personal and professional conduct, on and off the racetrack. In 1959, he dated legendary roller derby skater Ann Calvello.

Ray York retired in 1992 having won 3,082 races. On January 13, 2000, the 66-year-old became the first jockey to ride in seven different decades when he rode a 4-year-old gelding named Culebra to a tenth-place finish in a seven-furlong claiming race at Santa Anita Park in Arcadia, California. He died at a care facility near Bakersfield, California, from pneumonia on February 23, 2020, at the age of 86.
