= Santa Anita Derby =

Grade I Thoroughbred horse race

- Class: Grade I
- Location: Santa Anita Park; Arcadia, California, USA
- Inaugurated: 1935
- Race type: Thoroughbred – Flat racing
- Website: Santa Anita Park

Race information
- Distance: 1 1/8 miles (9 furlongs)
- Surface: Dirt
- Track: Left-handed
- Qualification: Three-year-olds only
- Weight: 124 lbs
- Purse: $500,000 (2024)

The Santa Anita Derby is an American Grade 1 thoroughbred horse race for three-year-olds run each April at Santa Anita Park in Arcadia, California. It is currently run at a distance of 1 1/8 miles on the dirt and carries a purse of US$500,000. It is one of the final prep races on the official Road to the Kentucky Derby.

== History ==
Inaugurated in 1935, the Santa Anita Derby has long been considered the most important West Coast stepping-stone to the Kentucky Derby. Since 2013, it has been part of the official Road to the Kentucky Derby, offering the winner 100 points and thus assuring a position in the starting gate. Since its inception, ten Santa Anita Derby winners have gone on to win the Kentucky Derby (shown in bold in the Winners section below), plus seven horses who lost at Santa Anita went on to triumph in Kentucky. In 1988, Winning Colors became the first and to date only filly to win both Derbies. Santa Anita Derby winners have also been successful in other Triple Crown races, with Affirmed sweeping the series in 1978.

Now run at a distance of 1 1/8 miles (9 Furlongs), for the first three years it was run at 1 1/16 miles, and at 1 1/4 miles in 1947. Until 2008, the race had been run on a natural dirt surface. The race has been contested on Cushion Track (2008) and Pro-Ride (2009 & 2010) artificial surfaces. In 2011, the race returned to dirt.

In 1938, Stagehand became the only colt to win both the Santa Anita Derby and the Santa Anita Handicap in the same year, defeating eventual Horse of the Year Seabiscuit in the latter.

Prep races leading to the Santa Anita Derby include the San Rafael Stakes, San Miguel Stakes, Sham Stakes, San Vicente Stakes, San Pedro Stakes, the Robert B. Lewis Stakes and the San Felipe Stakes, all run at Santa Anita Park. The Sham, Robert Lewis and San Felipe are also on the Road to the Kentucky Derby.

As a result of World War II, there were no races held from 1942 to 1944. The 2020 race was held on Saturday June 6 due to the COVID-19 outbreak.

== Records ==
- At age 17, Pat Valenzuela became the youngest jockey to win the Santa Anita Derby when he rode Codex to victory in the 1980 race.
- In 2000, Jenine Sahadi became the first woman trainer to win the Santa Anita Derby.
- In 2005, Jeff Mullins became the first trainer to win three consecutive editions of the Santa Anita Derby.

Speed Record:
Three horses share the record for the fastest winning time of 1:47 flat:

- Lucky Debonair (1965)
- Sham (1973)
- Indian Charlie (1998)

Most wins by an owner:

- 3 – Rex Ellsworth (1955, 1956, 1963)

Most wins by a jockey:

- 9 – Gary Stevens (1988, 1990, 1993, 1994, 1995, 1998, 1999, 2001, 2003)

Most wins by a Trainer:

- 9 – Bob Baffert (1996, 1998, 1999, 2001, 2009, 2011, 2015, 2018, 2019)

== Winners ==
Year	Winner	Jockey	Trainer	Owner	Distance (Miles)	Time	Grade
2026	So Happy	Mike E. Smith	Mark Glatt	Norman Stabl & Saints or Sinners	1 1/8	1:49.01	I
2025	Journalism	Umberto Rispoil	Michael W. McCarthy	Bridlewood Farm, Don Alberto Stable, Eclipse Thoroughbred Partners, Elayne Stables 5, Robert V. LePenta, Mrs. John Magnier Lessee, Derrick Smith Lessee & Michael Tabor Lessee	1 1/8	1:49.56	I
2024	Stronghold	Antonio Fresu	Philip D’Amato	Eric M. Waller & Sharon Waller	1 1/8	1:49.98	I
2023	Practical Move	Ramon A. Vazquez	Tim Yakteen	Leslie A. Amestoy, Pierre Jean Amestoy Jr. & Roger K. Beasley	1 1/8	1:48.69	I
2022	Taiba	Mike E. Smith	Tim Yakteen	Zedan Racing Stables	1 1/8	1:48.46	I
2021	Rock Your World	Umberto Rispoli	John W. Sadler	Hronis Racing LLC and David Michael Talla	1 1/8	1:49.17	I
2020	Honor A. P.	Mike E. Smith	John Shirreffs	C R K Stable LLC	1 1/8	1:48.97	I
2019	Roadster	Mike E. Smith	Bob Baffert	Speedway Stable LLC	1 1/8	1:51.28	I
2018	Justify (Note: Justify finished first but was disqualified and Bolt d'Oro was placed into first.)	Mike E. Smith	Bob Baffert	Winstar Farm, China Horse Club, SF Racing LLC	1 1/8	1:49.72	I
2017	Gormley	Victor Espinoza	John Shirreffs	Jerry Moss & Ann Moss	1 1/8	1:51.16	I
2016	Exaggerator	Kent J. Desormeaux	J. Keith Desormeaux	Big Chief Racing, Rocker O Ranch, Head Of Plain Parthers & J. Keith Desormeaux	1 1/8	1:49.66	I
2015	Dortmund	Martin Garcia	Bob Baffert	Kaleem Shah	1 1/8	1:48.73	I
2014	California Chrome	Victor Espinoza	Art Sherman	Martin Perry & Steve Coburn	1 1/8	1:47.52	I
2013	Goldencents	Kevin Krigger	Doug O'Neill	W. C. Racing, D. Kenney, RAP Racing	1 1/8	1:48.78	I
2012	I'll Have Another	Mario Gutierrez	Doug O'Neill	J. Paul Reddam	1 1/8	1:47.88	I
2011	Midnight Interlude	Victor Espinoza	Bob Baffert	Arnold Zetcher	1 1/8	1:48.56	I
2010	Sidney's Candy	Joe Talamo	John W. Sadler	Sid & Jenny Craig	1 1/8	1:48.00	I
2009	Pioneerof the Nile	Garrett Gomez	Bob Baffert	Zayat Stables	1 1/8	1:49.17	I
2008	Colonel John	Corey Nakatani	Eoin G. Harty	WinStar Farm	1 1/8	1:48.16	I
2007	Tiago	Mike E. Smith	John Shirreffs	Jerry & Ann Moss	1 1/8	1:49.51	I
2006	Brother Derek	Alex Solis	Dan Hendricks	Cecil Peacock	1 1/8	1:48.00	I
2005	Buzzards Bay	Mark Guidry	Jeff Mullins	Fog City Stable	1 1/8	1:49.18	I
2004	Castledale	Jose Valdivia Jr.	Jeff Mullins	Frank Lyons & Greg Knee	1 1/8	1:49.24	I
2003	Buddy Gil	Gary Stevens	Jeff Mullins	Desperado Stables, Donnie McFadden & Merrill Stables	1 1/8	1:49.36	I
2002	Came Home	Chris McCarron	Paco J. Gonzalez	John Toffan, Trudy McCaffery, William S. Farish III & John B. Goodman	1 1/8	1:50.02	I
2001	Point Given	Gary Stevens	Bob Baffert	The Thoroughbred Corp.	1 1/8	1:47.77	I
2000	The Deputy	Chris McCarron	Jenine Sahadi	Team Valor & Gary Barber	1 1/8	1:49.08	I
1999	General Challenge	Gary Stevens	Bob Baffert	Golden Eagle Farm	1 1/8	1:48.92	I
1998	Indian Charlie	Gary Stevens	Bob Baffert	Hal Earnhardt & John R. Gaines	1 1/8	1:47.00	I
1997	Free House	Kent Desormeaux	J. Paco Gonzalez	John Toffan & Trudy McCaffery	1 1/8	1:47.60	I
1996	Cavonnier	Chris McCarron	Bob Baffert	Walter Family Trust	1 1/8	1:48.91	I
1995	Larry the Legend	Gary Stevens	Craig A. Lewis	Craig A. Lewis	1 1/8	1:47.99	I
1994	Brocco	Gary Stevens	Randy Winick	Albert R. Broccoli	1 1/8	1:48.33	I
1993	Personal Hope	Gary Stevens	Mark A. Hennig	Lee & Debi Lewis	1 1/8	1:49.03	I
1992	A.P. Indy	Ed Delahoussaye	Neil Drysdale	Tomonori Tsurumaki	1 1/8	1:49.25	I
1991	Dinard	Chris McCarron	Richard J. Lundy	Allen E. Paulson	1 1/8	1:48.00	I
1990	Mister Frisky	Gary Stevens	Laz Barrera	Solymar Stable	1 1/8	1:49.00	I
1989	Sunday Silence	Pat Valenzuela	Charlie Whittingham	H-G-W Partners	1 1/8	1:47.60	I
1988	Winning Colors†	Gary Stevens	D. Wayne Lukas	Eugene V. Klein	1 1/8	1:47.80	I
1987	Temperate Sil	Bill Shoemaker	Charlie Whittingham	Frankfurt Stables & Charlie Whittingham	1 1/8	1:49.00	I
1986	Snow Chief	Alex Solis	Melvin F. Stute	Grinstead & Rochelle	1 1/8	1:48.60	I
1985	Skywalker	Laffit Pincay Jr.	Michael Whittingham	Oak Cliff Stable	1 1/8	1:48.40	I
1984	Mighty Adversary	Ed Delahoussaye	Tommy Doyle	M/M Felty J. Yoder	1 1/8	1:49.00	I
1983	Marfa	Jorge Velásquez	D. Wayne Lukas	French, Beal, D. Wayne Lukas	1 1/8	1:49.40	I
1982	Muttering	Laffit Pincay Jr.	D. Wayne Lukas	Tartan Farms (James & Virginia Binger)	1 1/8	1:47.60	I
1981	Splendid Spruce	Darrel McHargue	Chay R. Knight	Surf and Turf Stable	1 1/8	1:49.00	I
1980	Codex	Pat Valenzuela	D. Wayne Lukas	Tartan Stable	1 1/8	1:47.60	I
1979	Flying Paster	Donald Pierce	Gordon C. Campbell	Bernard J. Ridder	1 1/8	1:48.00	I
1978	Affirmed	Laffit Pincay Jr.	Laz Barrera	Harbor View Farm	1 1/8	1:48.00	I
1977	Habitony	Bill Shoemaker	Tommy Doyle	Anthony W. Pejsa	1 1/8	1:48.20	I
1976	An Act	Laffit Pincay Jr.	Ron McAnally	Katz RobertBrun Roberts	1 1/8	1:48.00	I
1975	Avatar	Jorge Tejeira	Tommy Doyle	Arthur A. Seeligson Jr.	1 1/8	1:47.60	I
1974	Destroyer	Ismael Valenzuela	Monti C. Sims	Kenneth Opstein	1 1/8	1:48.80	I
1973	Sham	Laffit Pincay Jr.	Frank "Pancho" Martin	Sigmund Sommer	1 1/8	1:47.00	I
1972	Solar Salute	Laffit Pincay Jr.	Louis Glauburg	M/M John J. Elmore	1 1/8	1:47.60	
1971	Jim French	Ángel Cordero Jr.	John P. Campo	Frank Caldwell	1 1/8	1:48.20	
1970	Terlago	Bill Shoemaker	Jerry M. Fanning	Samuel J. Agnew	1 1/8	1:48.40	
1969	Majestic Prince	Bill Hartack	Johnny Longden	Frank M. McMahon	1 1/8	1:49.20	
1968	Alley Fighter	Laffit Pincay Jr.	James W. Maloney	Cragwood Stables	1 1/8	1:49.00	
1967	Ruken	Fernando Alvarez	Clyde Turk	Louis R. Rowan	1 1/8	1:49.80	
1966	Boldnesian	Walter Blum	James W. Maloney	William Haggin Perry	1 1/8	1:48.40	
1965	Lucky Debonair	Bill Shoemaker	Frank Catrone	Ada L. Rice	1 1/8	1:47.00	
1964	Hill Rise	Donald Pierce	William B. Finnegan	El Peco Ranch	1 1/8	1:47.40	
1963	Candy Spots	Bill Shoemaker	Mesh Tenney	Rex C. Ellsworth	1 1/8	1:50.20	
1962	Royal Attack	Edward Burns	William J. Hirsch	Neil S. McCarthy	1 1/8	1:49.60	
1961	Four-and-Twenty	Johnny Longden	Vance Longden	Alberta Ranches, Ltd.	1 1/8	1:48.00	
1960	Tompion	Bill Shoemaker	Robert L. Wheeler	Cornelius V. Whitney	1 1/8	1:47.80	
1959	Silver Spoon†	Raymond York	Robert L. Wheeler	Cornelius V. Whitney	1 1/8	1:49.00	
1958	Silky Sullivan	Bill Shoemaker	Reggie Cornell	Tom Ross & Phil Klipstein	1 1/8	1:49.40	
1957	Sir William	Henry E. Moreno	Cecil Jolly	Louella & Herbert Armstrong	1 1/8	1:54.20	
1956	Terrang	Bill Shoemaker	Mesh Tenney	Rex C. Ellsworth	1 1/8	1:51.00	
1955	Swaps	Johnny Longden	Mesh Tenney	Rex C. Ellsworth	1 1/8	1:50.00	
1954	Determine	Raymond York	William Molter	Andrew J. Crevolin	1 1/8	1:48.80	
1953	Chanlea	Eddie Arcaro	Horace A. Jones	Calumet Farm	1 1/8	1:49.80	
1952	Hill Gail	Ted Atkinson	Horace A. Jones	Calumet Farm	1 1/8	1:50.00	
1951	Rough'n Tumble	Eddie Arcaro	Melvin Calvert	Frances Genter	1 1/8	1:50.40	
1950	Your Host	Johnny Longden	Harry L. Daniels	William Goetz	1 1/8	1:48.80	
1949	Old Rockport	Gordon Glisson	Phil Reilly	Clifford Mooers	1 1/8	1:50.20	
1948	Salmagundi	Johnny Longden	William M. Booth	William G. Helis	1 1/8	1:51.20	
1947	On Trust	Johnny Longden	William Molter	Earl O. Stice & Sons	1 1/4	2:03.20	
1946	Knockdown	Robert Permane	James W. Smith	Maine Chance Farm	1 1/8	1:50.60	
1945	Bymeabond	George Woolf	Wayne B. Stucki	J. Kel Houssels	1 1/8	1:50.00	
1941	Porter's Cap	Leon Haas	Tom Smith	Charles S. Howard	1 1/8	1:54.40	
1940	Sweepida	Ralph Neves	L. Roy Staples	H. C. "Dutch" Hill	1 1/8	1:51.60	
1939	Ciencia†	Carroll Bierman	William J. Hirsch	King Ranch	1 1/8	1:50.60	
1938	Stagehand	Jack Westrope	Earl Sande	Maxwell Howard	1 1/8	1:50.40	
1937	Fairy Hill	Maurice Peters	Richard E. Handlen	William du Pont Jr.	1 1/16	1:45.80	
1936	He Did	Wayne D. Wright	J. Thomas Taylor	Suzanne Mason	1 1/16	1:49.40	
1935	Gillie	Silvio Coucci	William Brennan	Greentree Stable	1 1/16	1:44.60	

† Indicates filly

Bold typeface indicates Kentucky Derby winner

== See also ==
- Santa Anita Derby "top three finishers" and starters
- Road to the Kentucky Derby
