= James Harold Seley =

American businessman

James Harold "Hal" Seley (April 19, 1906 – September 22, 1994) was an American businessman.

In 1947, when owner Dan Reeves relocated his National Football League Cleveland Rams to Los Angeles, Seley acquired an interest in the team.

In 1957, he established Seley Ranches, a citrus farm in Southern California's Anza-Borrego Valley. Best known for its "Seley Reds" brand of grapefruit, the business remains in family hands.

== Thoroughbred horse racing ==
Hal Seley and his wife owned a stable of Thoroughbred racehorses. Among their successes, their colt Trackmaster won the 1955 California Derby and the 1956 Santa Anita Maturity. They had two horses compete in the Kentucky Derby. Duplicator, who won the California Breeders' Champion Stakes, finished eighth in the 1949 Derby and Trackmaster's son, Field Master, finished thirteenth in the 1967 edition.
