= Meadow Court =

British-bred, Irish-trained Thoroughbred racehorse

- Sire: Court Harwell
- Grandsire: Prince Chevalier
- Dam: Meadow Music
- Damsire: Tom Fool
- Sex: Stallion
- Foaled: 1962
- Country: Great Britain
- Colour: Chestnut
- Breeder: Elisabeth Ireland Poe
- Owner: Max Bell, Frank McMahon, Bing Crosby
- Trainer: Paddy Prendergast
- Record: 8: 3-4-?
- Earnings: US$254,503 (equivalent)

Major wins
- Irish Derby (1965); K. George VI & Q. Elizabeth Stakes (1965)
- Last updated on 11 July 2022

Meadow Court (1962-c. 1982) was a British-bred, Irish-trained Thoroughbred racehorse. He won the Irish Derby and the King George VI & Queen Elizabeth Stakes in 1965.

== Background ==
He was bred by the American heiress Elisabeth Ireland Poe who owned Shawnee Farm in Harrodsburg, Kentucky as well as a racing and breeding operation in Ireland. Meadow Court was sired by Court Harwell, and out of the mare Meadow Music. His grandsire was Prince Chevalier, the Leading sire in France in 1960, and his damsire the U.S. Racing Hall of Fame inductee, Tom Fool.

Meadow Court was owned by Canadian businessman Max Bell and Frank McMahon, the owners of Golden West Farms, and the famous American singer, Bing Crosby.

== Racing career ==
Meadow Court had the bad luck to be born the same year as the great colt, Sea-Bird, behind whom he finished second in the 1965 Epsom Derby. However, that year Meadow Court went on to win the Irish Derby. In the winner's circle at the Curragh, Bing Crosby sang When Irish Eyes Are Smiling for the crowd. Meadow Court then gave jockey Lester Piggott his first win in the King George VI and Queen Elizabeth Stakes. In the autumn, starting at long odds on, Meadow Court ran second to Provoke in the St. Leger Stakes on a rain-soaked Town Moor (Doncaster). A month later, the horse travelled over to Paris to contest the Prix l'Arc de Triomphe. His pacemaker, Khalife, was unable to get to the front and Meadow Court finished a distant ninth to Sea Bird.

== Stud career ==
Retired to stud duty, Meadow Court's offspring met with modest success. The product of his last mating was born in 1981.
