= Vance Longden =

American horse trainer

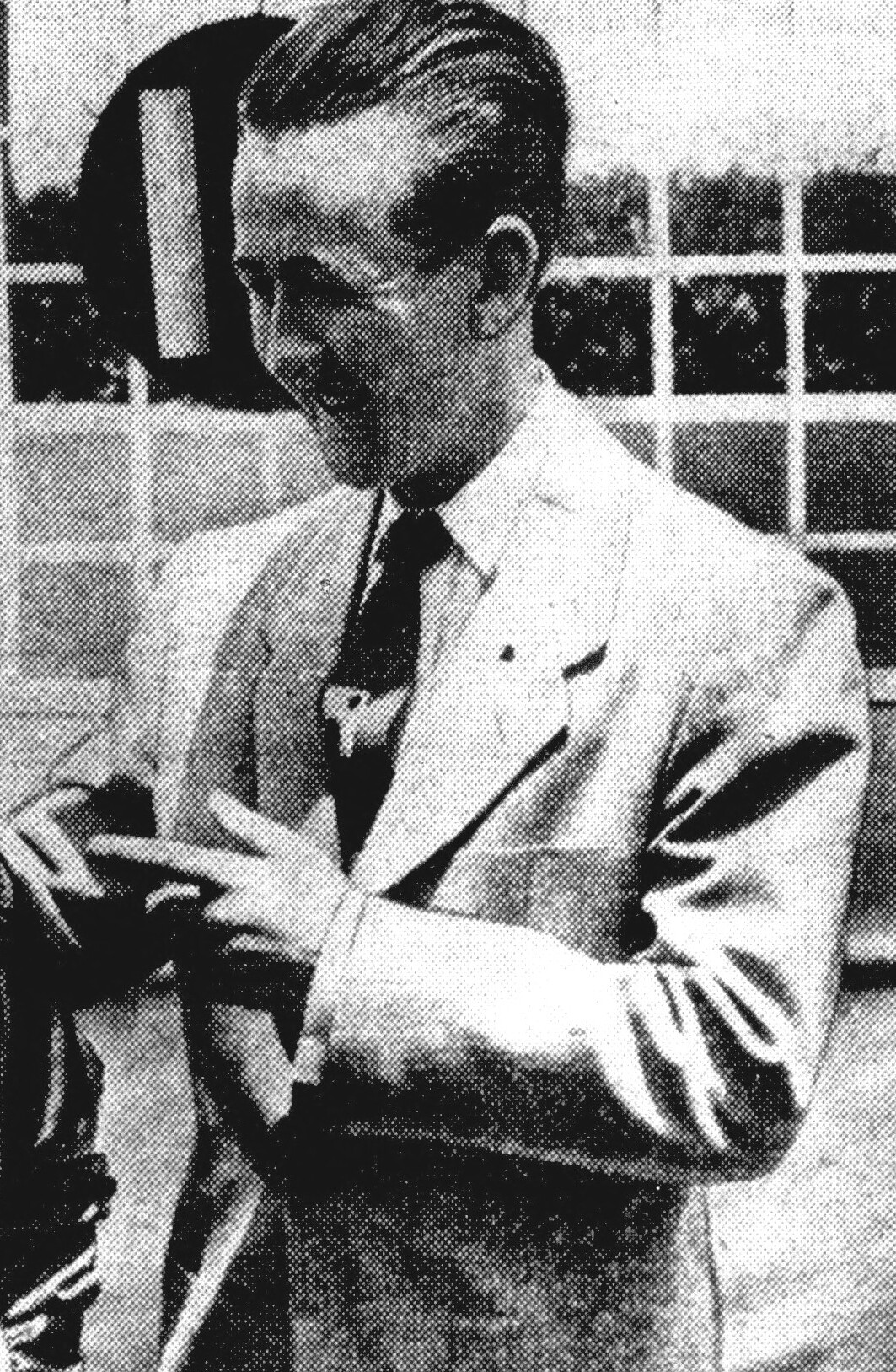
- Longden in 1950

Personal information
- Born: March 14, 1930 California
- Died: January 7, 2003 (aged 72)
- Occupation: Trainer

Horse racing career
- Sport: Horse racing
- Career wins: Not found

Major racing wins
- Hollywood Gold Cup (1953); San Gabriel Handicap (1955); San Juan Capistrano Handicap (1955); San Luis Obispo Handicap (1954, 1955, 1957); Hollywood Derby (1961); San Felipe Stakes (1961); Santa Anita Derby (1961); San Fernando Stakes (1962, 1972); San Bernardino Handicap (1962); San Carlos Handicap (1962); Santa Anita Maturity (1962); Los Angeles Handicap (1972); Santa Anita Handicap (1972)

Significant horses
- Royal Serenade, St. Vincent; Four-and-Twenty, Triple Bend
- Updated on March 7, 2007

Vance Longden (March 14, 1930 – January 7, 2003) was an American Thoroughbred horse trainer based in California.

Vance Longden was the son of U.S. Racing Hall of Fame jockey Johnny Longden and his first wife, Helen. He was raised around horses and apprenticed with trainer William Molter. At age twenty-three, Vance Longden was training on his own and using his father to ride some of his horses. Together, and as part of the Alberta Ranches, Ltd. partnership, they successfully raced a number of horses including the 1953 Hollywood Gold Cup winner Royal Serenade, the 1955 U.S. Champion Turf Horse St. Vincent, plus Four-and-Twenty, winner of the 1961 Santa Anita Derby. The North American Pari-Mutuel Regulators Association says they are perhaps the only father-son, jockey-trainer duo ever to win major races at major tracks.

Longden also raced a few seasons at Hastings Racecourse in Vancouver, British Columbia where he won thirty-six stakes races. In 1961 Vance Longden had two starters in the Kentucky Derby, both finishing off the board.

Vance Londgen battled throat cancer for several years and eventually was only able to speak through the use of a voice box. His illness forced his retirement from racing and he was living in Arcadia, California at the time of his death in 2003.
