= Alberta Ranches, Ltd. =

- Type: Horse breeding/Racing Stable
- Industry: Thoroughbred Horse racing
- Founded: 1952
- Headquarters: Okotoks, Alberta, Canada & Arcadia, California, United States
- Key people: John Longden, owner/jockey Vance Longden, owner/trainer Frank McMahon, owner Wilder H. Ripley, owner, Max Bell, owner

Alberta Ranches, Ltd. was a Thoroughbred horse racing partnership between U.S. Racing Hall of Fame jockey and Kentucky Derby-winning trainer Johnny Longden, his son Vance, and businessmen and Frank McMahon, Wilder H. Ripley, and Max Bell. The three men were all longtime friends from the Province of Alberta in Canada. The partnership was formed in 1952 and was dissolved in 1962 following a dispute between McMahon and Bell.

The business leased part of Bell and McMahon's 640-acre (260 ha) Golden West Farms Thoroughbred breeding operation at Okotoks, Alberta and based their racing stable in Los Angeles, California.

Alberta Ranches, Ltd.'s racing colors were purple and white. The racing partnership notably owned Royal Serenade, a colt they bought in England and brought to California where he won the 1953 Hollywood Gold Cup. Another important horse was Four-and-Twenty who won the 1961 Hollywood and Santa Anita Derbys. In 1961 the partnership had two starters in the Kentucky Derby. They won a number of other important stakes races including the Hollywood Gold Cup (1953), Santa Margarita Invitational Handicap (1955), Palomar Handicap (1955, 1956). Santa Maria Handicap (1955, 1956). San Felipe Stakes (1961). Strub Stakes (1962), and the San Bernardino Handicap (1962).

The Longdens additionally contributed to the business through riding and training the horses. The Alberta Ranches, Ltd. partners were each racehorse owners, both individually as well as in other partnerships. Johnny Longden, his son, and second wife Hazel, owned a number of horses. Max Bell and Frank McMahon founded the Golden West Farms breeding and racing operation whose wins included Canada's most prestigious race, the Queen's Plate. Max Bell and Frank McMahon owned other horses such as the colt Meadow Court in a partnership with friend, Bing Crosby. Meadow Court raced in Europe where he won the 1965 Irish Derby and the King George VI and Queen Elizabeth Stakes.

Frank McMahon is best known as the owner of Majestic Prince who won the 1969 Kentucky Derby and Preakness Stakes. Majestic Prince was inducted in the U.S. Racing Hall of Fame in 1988.
