= Oceanside Stakes =

- Class: Restricted stakes
- Location: Del Mar Racetrack; Del Mar, California
- Inaugurated: 1937
- Race type: Thoroughbred - Flat racing
- Website: www.dmtc.com

Race information
- Distance: 1 mile (8 furlongs)
- Surface: Turf
- Track: Left-handed
- Qualification: Three-year-olds & up
- Purse: $100,000+

The Oceanside Stakes is an American Thoroughbred horse race run annually in July at Del Mar Racetrack in Del Mar, California. Raced on turf since 1975, it is restricted to three-year-old non-winners of a $50,000 sweepstakes. The race is contested at a distance of one mile. First run in 1937 as the Oceanside Handicap, through 1939 and again in 1975-76 it was open to horses age three and up. In 1950, the race was restricted to fillies and mares.

Historically a very popular event, the Oceanside was raced in two divisions in 1964, 1977, 1978, 1981, 1982, 1983, 1985, 1987, 1989, 1990, 1991, 1992, 1993, 1994, 1995, 1996, 1997, 1998, 1999, 2000, 2001, 2002, 2003, 2004, 2005, 2006, 2008 and 2012. In 2007, the number of entrants required it to be run in three divisions. In 2014 and 2015 there was only one division.

The Oceanside Handicap was not run from 1940 through 1948.

== Past winners ==
2016

- Monster Bea (1:35.93) (Gary Stevens)

2015

- Soul Driver (1:35.86) (Mike E. Smith)

2014

- Enterprising (1:33.89) (Mike E. Smith)

2013

- First Division: Gervinho (1:33.88) (Rafael Bejarano)
- Second Division: Rising Legend (1:33.96) (Julien Leparoux)

2012

- First Division: Midnight Crooner (1:34.74) (Rafael Bejarano)
- Second Division: My Best Brother (1:34.39) (Martin Garcia)

2011

- Mr. Commons (1:34.96)

2010

- Twirling Candy (1:34.69)

2009

- Afleet Eagle (1:34.35)

2008

- First Division: Kilderry (1:35.45)
- Second Division: Dixie Chatter (1:35.81)

2007

- First Division: Ten a Penny (1:35.51)
- Second Division: Knockout Artist (1:35.45)

2006

- First Division: Lightning Hit (1:34.12)
- Second Division: Obrigato (1:34.20)

2005

- First Division: Becrux (1:33.91)
- Second Division: El Roblar (1:33.57)

2004

- First Division: Wild Babe (1:34.56)
- Second Division: Blackdoun (1:33.54)

2003

- First Division: Sweet Return (1:33.98)
- Second Division: Devious Boy (1:34.73)

2002

- First Division: Rock Opera (1:34.14)
- Second Division: True Phenomena (1:34.52)

2001

- First Division: Sigfreto (1:35.90)
- Second Division: Dr. Park (1:34.47)

2000

- First Division: Duke of Green (1:35.57)
- Second Division: Stormy Jack (1:36.67)
