= Golden West Farms =

Coordinates: 50.723055°N 113.999772°W

Golden West Farms was a Canadian Thoroughbred horse racing stable and breeding farm at Okotoks, Alberta owned by Frank McMahon and Max Bell.

Both partners were successful businessmen who invested in Thoroughbred racehorses. Frank McMahon most notably owned U.S. Racing Hall of Fame colt Majestic Prince, winner of the 1969 Kentucky Derby and Preakness Stakes. Max Bell owned successful horses including the colt Meadow Court in a partnership with friend, Bing Crosby. Meadow Court raced in Europe where he won the 1965 Irish Derby and the King George VI and Queen Elizabeth Stakes.

According to the Canadian Horse Racing Hall of Fame, Golden West Farms was "by far the most elaborate thoroughbred breeding farm between Ontario and British Columbia". The operation campaigned at race tracks across Canada. In 1967 their horse Gilmore won the Canadian Derby at Edmonton's Northlands Park. Trainer Roy Johnson campaigned horses for Golden West Farms at Woodbine Racetrack during the 1960s where they won numerous stakes races including the Coronation Futurity Stakes and the 1968 Plate Trial Stakes then Canada's most prestigious horse race, the Queen's Plate.

The partnership was dissolved on the death of Max Bell in 1972.
