= Midnight Interlude =

1931 Australian radio play

- Genre: drama play
- Running time: 30 mins (8:15 pm – 8:45 pm)
- Country of origin: Australia
- Language: English
- Home station: 2GB
- Written by: Rex Rienits
- Recording studio: Sydney
- Original release: April 29, 1931

Midnight Interlude is a 1931 Australian radio play by Rex Rienits. It was one of the earliest Australian written plays on radio. The play helped launch Rienits' career as a radio writer.

== Premise ==
According to one description, "It concerns the meeting at midnight of a burglar and a prominent financier, in the home of the latter. The burglar has broken in with the intention of rifling financier’s safe, but he is discovered at his task. Both men are suave and quick-witted, as befits their respective professions, but their calm is shattered when the mutual discovery is made that, years before, they attended lectures together at the university. Because of their old friendship the financier makes the burglar a sporting offer of escape, and from thence the duologue resolves itself into a battle of wits between the two men. with honors fairly easy at the finish."
