= Johnny Longden =

American horse trainer and jockey (1907–2003)

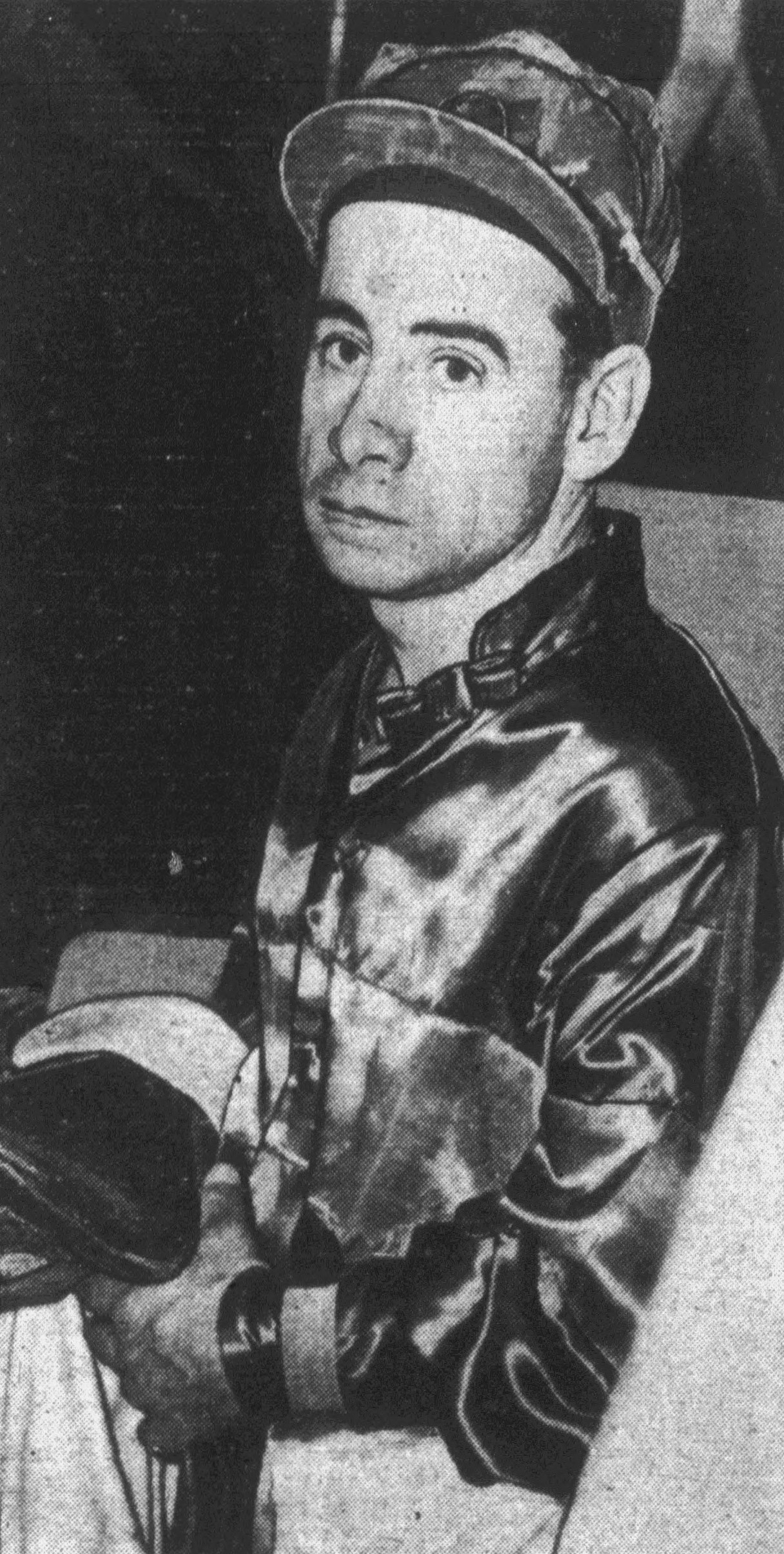
- Longden, circa 1947

Personal information
- Born: February 14, 1907 Wakefield, Yorkshire, England
- Died: February 14, 2003 (aged 96) Banning, California, U.S.
- Occupation: Jockey / Trainer

Horse racing career
- Sport: Horse racing
- Career wins: 6,032

Major racing wins
- American Classics wins: As a jockey: United States Triple Crown (1943); Kentucky Derby (1943); Preakness Stakes (1943); Belmont Stakes (1943); As a trainer: Kentucky Derby (1969); Preakness Stakes (1969) Other: Hollywood Gold Cup (1950, 1953, 1954, 1961); Hollywood Derby (1945, 1948, 1949, 1961, 1964); Canadian Derby (1932); Matron Stakes (1937); Wood Memorial Stakes (1937, 1943, 1944); Brooklyn Handicap (1938); Adirondack Stakes (1938, 1941, 1942); Walden Stakes (1938, 1942); Hopeful Stakes (1940); Breeders' Futurity (1940); Saratoga Special Stakes (1940); Champagne Stakes (1939, 1942); Lawrence Realization Stakes (1943); Remsen Stakes (1943); Withers Stakes (1943, 1944); Gazelle Handicap (1944); Bing Crosby Handicap (1964); Del Mar Oaks (1964); Del Mar Handicap (1952, 1955, 1956); Palomar Breeders' Cup Handicap (1955, 1956, 1964); Del Mar Derby (1963); Del Mar Futurity (1950); Santa Anita Handicap (1945, 1950, 1951, 1956); Jamaica Handicap (1947); Kentucky Oaks (1947); Santa Anita Derby (1947, 1948, 1950, 1955, 1961, 1969); San Felipe Stakes (1945, 1947, 1950, 1953, 1961); San Juan Capistrano Handicap (1950, 1951, 1955, 1965, 1966); Hawthorne Gold Cup Handicap (1961); Washington, D.C. International (1961); Canadian International Stakes (1965)

Racing awards
- United States Champion Jockey by earnings (1943, 1945); United States Champion Jockey by wins (1938, 1947, 1948); George Woolf Memorial Jockey Award (1952); Avelino Gomez Memorial Award (1985); Eclipse Special Award (1994)

Honors
- United States' Racing Hall of Fame (1958); Canada's Sports Hall of Fame (1958); Canadian Horse Racing Hall of Fame (1976); Fair Grounds Racing Hall of Fame (1995); Lifesize bust at Santa Anita Park; Longden Turf Course at Bay Meadows Racetrack; Longden Avenue, Arcadia, California

Significant horses
- Count Fleet, Busher, Jet Pilot, Your Host, Whirlaway, Noor, Rushaway, Swaps, T.V. Lark, Four-and-Twenty, George Royal, Majestic Prince
- Updated on March 6, 2007

John Eric "Johnny" Longden (February 14, 1907 – February 14, 2003) was an American Hall of Fame and National Champion jockey and a trainer of Thoroughbred racehorses who was born in Wakefield, Yorkshire, England. His father emigrated to Canada in 1909, settling in Taber, Alberta.

== Career ==
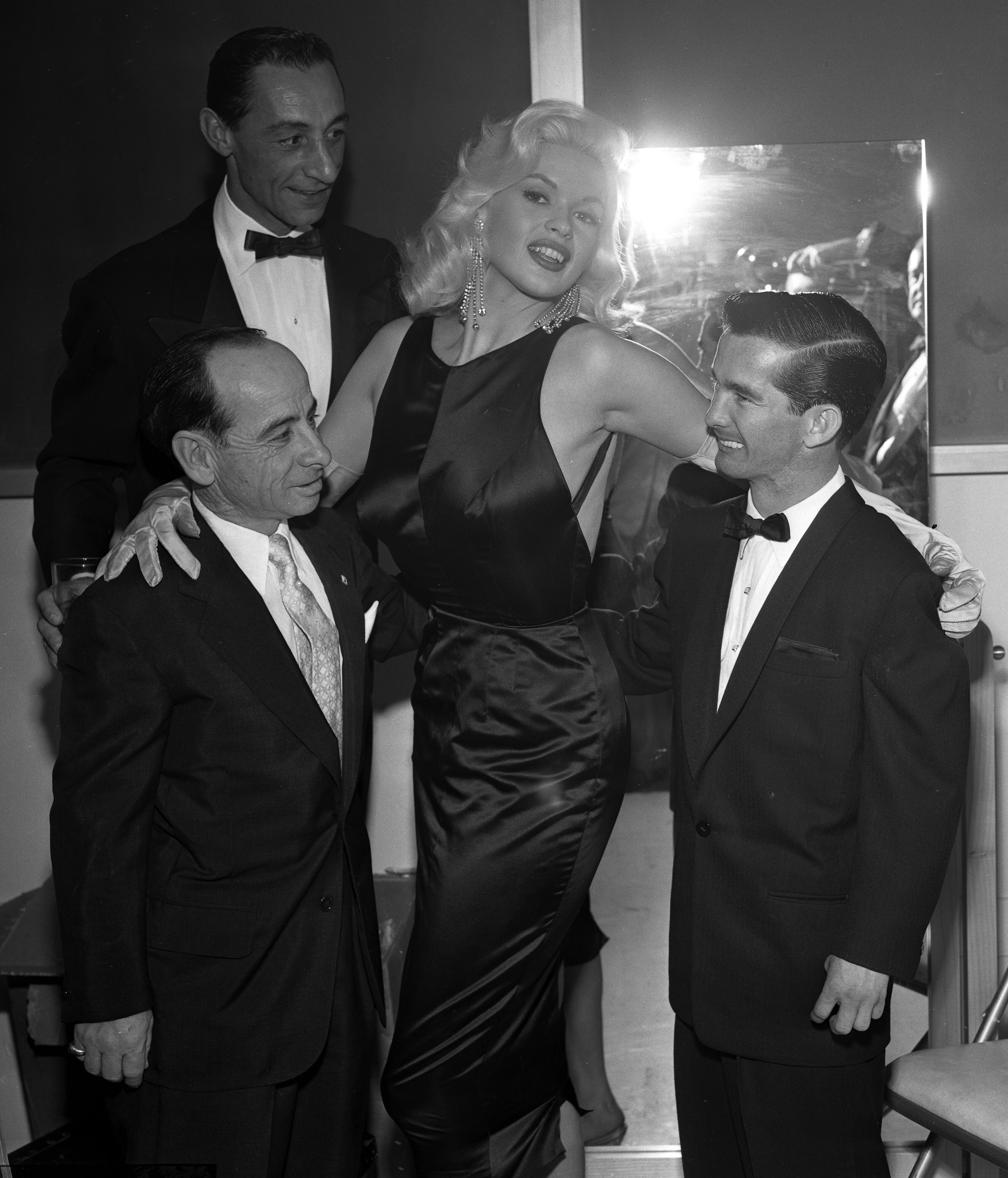
Jayne Mansfield with jockeys Johhny Longden, Eddie Arcaro and Willie Shoemaker (left to right) in 1957

By 1912, Longden Sr. had saved enough money to send for his wife and young son to join him in Canada. However, the Longdens' train was late getting to the port of Southampton, and they missed their scheduled voyage to New York City on the Titanic.

As a young man, Longden Jr. worked in the mining industry. His love of horses and horse-racing, as well as his small stature standing at 4' 11', led him to leave Canada in 1927 to seek opportunities as a jockey in California's burgeoning racing scene. Based at Santa Anita Park, by 1956 he had become thoroughbred racing's winningest rider, breaking the record of 4,870 wins by British jockey Sir Gordon Richards (1904–1988). Longden, who was called "The Pumper" by his fellow jockeys because of his riding style, rode many of the great thoroughbreds of the day. In 1943, he captured the United States Triple Crown of Thoroughbred Racing winning the Kentucky Derby, the Preakness Stakes and the Belmont Stakes aboard Count Fleet. A sculptured bust of Longden, along with busts of fellow jockeys William Shoemaker and Laffit Pincay, has been placed in the paddock area at Santa Anita Racetrack in Arcadia, California.

A founding member of the Jockeys' Guild in 1940, Longden was the United States' leading jockey in races won in 1938, 1947, and 1948. He was also the leading jockey in purses won in 1943 and 1945. He was voted the prestigious George Woolf Memorial Jockey Award in 1952.

In 1958, Longden was inducted into the National Museum of Racing and Hall of Fame. He retired the following year as the jockey with the most wins in racing history with 6,032 victories from his 32,413 mounts. His last ride was in the 1966 San Juan Capistrano Handicap at Santa Anita Park, which he won aboard George Royal in a stretch duel. The clubhouse at Santa Anita Park contains an oil painting of the finish of this race. The image was used for the cover of the Santa Anita official program during the 1967 racing season.

== Horse ownership and training career ==
Longden operated a racing stable under the name Alberta Ranches Ltd. in partnership with Frank McMahon, Wilder H. Ripley and Max Bell, longtime friends from Alberta. On January 28, 1971, Longden's wife Hazel became the first woman to train a stakes winner at Santa Anita Park when her horse Diplomatic Agent won the San Vicente Stakes. Longden's sons Eric and Vance Longden both became horse trainers.

Following his retirement from riding, Longden turned to training and became the only person to ever win the Kentucky Derby as both a jockey and trainer when he captured the 1969 Derby with Frank McMahon's colt Majestic Prince. Longden was inducted into the Canadian Horse Racing Hall of Fame on its formation in 1976. He went on to become the second ever recipient of the Avelino Gomez Memorial Award in 1985, given annually to jockeys who have made significant contributions to the sport. In 1994, he was recognized further by the North American racing industry with a Special Eclipse Award.

== Harness racing ==
The June 12, 1954 issue of the Daily Racing Form reported that Johnny Longden was also an owner of a Standardbred racehorse which he personally drove to victory in a race at Sportsman's Park in Phoenix, Arizona.

== Television appearance ==
In 1957, Johnny Longden and his wife Hazel Longden, both appeared briefly as themselves on the legendary sitcom, I Love Lucy. In the episode, "Lucy and the Loving Cup" (Season 6 Episode 12), Longden was set to receive a trophy for being the winningest jockey in history at an awards dinner at the Babalú nightclub run by Ricky Ricardo. Early in the episode, Ricky makes fun of Lucy's new hat, so she puts the trophy over her head as a joke, but it ends up stuck on her head; after many failed attempts to remove it, she is forced to comically make her way through the New York City Subway system to get the trophy to the club in time for the ceremony. After a run-in with an elderly lady, a homeless man and a cop, Lucy finally makes it to the nightclub and the trophy (with Lucy's head still stuck inside) is presented to a very confused Johnny Longden. Longden thanks Ricky for the trophy but asks what he should do about Ricky's wife. Ricky replies that Lucy has been his problem for 15 years, so now Johnny can deal with her.

== Last years/legacy ==
As of 2006, Longden still holds five track records at Santa Anita Park. Longden was a member of the Church of Jesus Christ of Latter-day Saints. Longden died on February 14, 2003, his 96th birthday, at his home in Banning, California.

== Sources ==
- Beckwith, Brainerd Kellogg. The Longden Legend. (1973) A. S. Barnes Publishing Co.; ISBN 0-498-01242-5
- Newsreel of his last race
- Drager, Marvin. The Most Glorious Crown: The Story Of America's Triple Crown Thoroughbreds From Sir Barton To Affirmed (2005) Triumph Books; ISBN 1-57243-724-3
