= Frank McMahon (oilman) =

Canadian oilman

- Born: Francis Murray Patrick McMahon; October 2, 1902; Moyie, British Columbia
- Died: May 20, 1986 (aged 83); Hamilton, Bermuda
- Education: Gonzaga University
- Occupation: Businessman
- Known for: Westcoast Transmission Co., Majestic Prince, McMahon Stadium

Francis Murray Patrick McMahon (/məkˈmæn/ mək-MAN; October 2, 1902 – May 20, 1986) was a Canadian oilman best known as the founder of Pacific Petroleums and the Westcoast Transmission Company. Time magazine called him "The man who did the most to open up northwest Canada's wilderness—and convince oilmen of its treasures."

In addition, McMahon was a major racehorse owner/breeder whose Thoroughbreds competed in North America and Europe and who won the 1969 Kentucky Derby and Preakness Stakes with the U.S. Racing Hall of Fame colt, Majestic Prince.

== Biography ==
=== Early life and career ===
Frank McMahon was born in the village of Moyie in the East Kootenays of British Columbia, Canada, the son of a hard-rock miner.

He attended Gonzaga University in Spokane, Washington, where he was a campus mate of Bing Crosby. As a young man, he worked as a driller for British Columbia mining companies until 1927 when he founded his own diamond-drilling contracting business which he expanded into drilling for oil and natural gas.

=== West Turner Petroleums ===
Frank McMahon and two brothers established West Turner Petroleums to explore and develop oil deposits in the Turner Valley Oilfields in Alberta. Their major find generated sufficient revenues and income to allow for expansion through acquisitions and exploration. He later merged two smaller companies with West Turner and formed a holding company, Pacific Petroleums Ltd.

In 1945 McMahon founded Atlantic Oil Company and acquired rights to a part of the Leduc field, near Leduc, Alberta. After Imperial Oil's discovery of oil at Leduc in 1947, the Atlantic No. 3 well discovered oil on March 8, 1948. It was well-publicized due to the oil blowout that took six months to contain and a well fire that started in the week prior to the well being contained. The well propelled McMahon's wealth. Pacific's headquarters were set up in Calgary, Alberta.

In December 1947, McMahon's operations began oil and gas exploration in the Peace River Region after the B.C. government opened the area to exploration.

In November 1951, Pacific's Fort St. John No. 1 well found significant quantities of good quality oil, British Columbia's first oil discovery. In 1952 the company drilled the first of many high-producing gas wells at Fort St. John.

In about 1961 McMahon and his brother George sold their controlling interest in Pacific Petroleums to Phillips Petroleum Company. In 1977 Pacific Petroleums was purchased by Petro-Canada.

=== Westcoast Transmission ===
McMahon saw an enormous opportunity to supply natural gas to the huge United States market. In 1949 he incorporated Westcoast Transmission Co. Ltd. whose business plan included the construction of a 650-mile gas pipeline from Taylor in north-eastern British Columbia to the United States.

McMahon personally began lobbying the Canadian and American governments to remove their restrictions on the export and import of natural gas. In December 1954, he signed a $400-million contract with Pacific Northwest Pipeline Corp. to sell natural gas into their pipeline system in the United States. In 1955 Westcoast was awarded permission from the U.S. Federal Power Commission to export gas. Construction started the same year on the $170-million, 650-mile Westcoast Pipeline from the Peace River area to the U.S. border, to hook into the Pacific Northwest Pipeline Corp.'s six-state gas grid and to supply gas to Vancouver. The pipeline was Canada's first "big-inch" pipeline. Along with its gathering system, the processing plants and compressor stations were completed in the fall of 1957.

In 1964, Westcoast Transmission built another processing plant at Fort Nelson, British Columbia, in support of an additional 250-mile line to the company's new discoveries in the Canadian Northwest.

After McMahon's death in 1986, Westcoast Transmission Co. Ltd. was renamed Westcoast Energy Inc., and in 2002 Duke Energy of Charlotte, North Carolina, acquired the company in a deal worth US$3.5 billion. The natural gas pipeline business was later spun off as part of Spectra Energy, which merged with Enbridge in 2017.

=== Other business ventures ===
In the 1950s McMahon had an interest in Alberta Distillers Ltd. The distillery was started in Calgary, Alberta with Max Bell in 1946. In October 1957, Time magazine estimated his worth at $50-million and that he controlled assets in partnership with others that totaled about $500-million.

McMahon's significant contribution to Canada's economic prosperity was recognized by his election to the Canadian Business Hall of Fame.

In the 1950s McMahon backed a number of Broadway plays in New York, including The Pajama Game and Damn Yankees.

=== Horse racing ===
Frank McMahon, a founding member of the Jockey Club of Canada, raced thoroughbreds on his own as well as in partnership with others.

His Frank McMahon Stable Inc. won numerous races at racetracks across Canada including the 1966 British Columbia Derby at Exhibition Park Racetrack in Vancouver and the 1970 Canadian Derby at Edmonton's Northlands Park. His most famous horse was Majestic Prince.

McMahon was inducted in the British Columbia Horse Racing Hall of Fame in 1995 in the breeders/owners category.

He set up a racing stable in California with U.S. Racing Hall of Fame jockey-turned-trainer Johnny Longden. Among the horses they raced was the great Majestic Prince whose important stakes include the 1969 Kentucky Derby and Preakness Stakes. Majestic Prince was inducted into the National Museum of Racing and Hall of Fame in 1988 and was listed at No. 46 in The Blood-Horse magazine ranking of the top 100 U.S. thoroughbred champions of the 20th century. In 1975, McMahon had another Triple Crown contender with Diabolo who finished third in both the Kentucky Derby and Preakness Stakes, and was fourth in the Belmont Stakes.

In the 1950s he was part owner of Alberta Ranches, Ltd. which won the 1953 Hollywood Gold Cup with Royal Serenade.

Together with Calgary newspaper publisher Max Bell, McMahon founded the Golden West Farms thoroughbred breeding operation at Okotoks, Alberta. Among its notable wins, Golden West Farms' racing stable won the 1968 Queen's Plate with Merger. In partnership with American singer, Bing Crosby, McMahon and Bell owned Meadow Court who raced in Europe where he won the 1965 Irish Derby and the King George VI and Queen Elizabeth Stakes.

McMahon also teamed up with Kentucky horseman Leslie Combs II of Spendthrift Farm to breed Crowned Prince, a sibling of Majestic Prince, who in 1970 became the first yearling to be sold at auction for half a million dollars. McMahon won the bidding for Crowned Prince and sent him to race in England where he won the Dewhurst and Champagne Stakes and was the 1971 champion two-year-old colt in England. Leslie Combs also bred McMahon's Triple Bend, a colt who set a world record time in winning the 1972 Los Angeles Handicap.

=== McMahon Stadium ===
In 1960 Frank and brother George McMahon donated $300,000 to the then University of Alberta (Calgary), now the University of Calgary, to help build a football stadium. They also guaranteed the $750,000 balance of the $1,050,000 construction cost. It was named McMahon Stadium in their honour. In 1988, the stadium hosted the opening and closing ceremonies of that year's winter Olympics held in Calgary.

The university acquired complete ownership of the stadium and land in 1985 after the guaranteed financing was retired in 1973. The stadium is operated by the McMahon Stadium Society. Until the guaranteed financing was retired the McMahons appointed two of the six members of the society. The first treasurer of the society was the McMahons' accountant, William Macintosh.

In 2001 the McMahon brothers were named to the Calgary Stampeders Wall of Fame in the builder category.

=== Personal life ===
On 17 September 1928, McMahon married Isabella Marion Grant (1903–1995). The couple had three children: Frank Grant (1929–1953), William George (1930–2022), and Marion Brenda (Mrs Dean L. Macdonald). The couple divorced in 1955. Following the divorce, Isabella remarried to actor Gar Moore (1920–1985) and settled in Palm Springs.

On 7 April 1956 in Branford, Connecticut, McMahon remarried to Betty Lorraine Betz (1920–2010). Betz, born in Chicago, attended Sarah Lawrence College where she earned a degree in journalism in 1941. After graduation, she worked for a year for Harper's Bazaar, and then went on to create an advice column for teens, which was syndicated in Hearst newspapers. In 1951 she hosted the television programme Going Places with Betty Betz. Additionally, she illustrated seven books, including Manners for Moppets, The Betty Betz Teen-Age Cookbook, and The Betty Betz Party Book, the Teen-Age Guide to Social Success. The McMahons maintained several residences, including the famous "Concha Marina" in Palm Beach and "Crow Lane House" in Bermuda. The couple had two children: Francine Patricia and Bettina Lorraine (1959–2014).

Frank McMahon died in Hamilton, Bermuda, in 1986 and was buried at St Paul's in Paget.
