= Candy Ride =

Argentine-bred Thoroughbred racehorse

- Sire: Ride The Rails (USA)
- Grandsire: Cryptoclearance
- Dam: Candy Girl
- Damsire: Candy Stripes
- Sex: Stallion
- Foaled: September 27, 1999
- Country: Argentina
- Colour: Bay
- Breeder: Haras Abolengo
- Owner: Sidney & Jenny Craig
- Trainer: Ron McAnally
- Record: 6: 6-0-0
- Earnings: US$749,149

Major wins
- Gran Premio San Isidro (2002); G. P. Internacional Joaquín S. de Anchorena (2002); American Handicap (2003); Pacific Classic Stakes (2003)

Awards
- Argentina Champion Miler (2002)

Candy Ride (foaled September 27, 1999 in Argentina) is a retired Thoroughbred racehorse who went undefeated in six starts on both turf and dirt racing surfaces in Argentina and the United States. In Argentina, he won the Gran Premio San Isidro and the Gran Premio Joaquin S. de Anchorena, setting a world record of 1:31.01 for 1,600 meters on the turf in the latter. He was named Argentina's Champion Miler of 2002. Relocated to the United States in 2003, he won the American Handicap and set a track record in the Pacific Classic Stakes. Retired to stud in Kentucky, he developed into a top 10 sire whose notable offspring include American Horse of the Year Gun Runner.

== Background ==
Candy Ride is a bay stallion standing 16^{1}/_{2} hands (64.5 inches, 164 cm) high who was bred in Argentina by Haras Abolengo. He was sired by American-bred Ride The Rails, who raced in the United States and stood at stud in Argentina. His grandsire is American multiple Grade I winner Cryptoclearance, who was a grandson of Mr. Prospector. Candy Ride is out of the mare Candy Girl, a daughter of Candy Stripes, who also sired 2005 American Champion Male Turf Horse Leroidesanimaux and 2006 American Horse of the Year Invasor. Candy Girl is from a strong female family that produced multiple stakes winners in South America.

As a yearling, Candy Ride was privately sold for the equivalent of about $12,000 to Gumercindo Alonzo.

== Racing record ==
=== 2002: in Argentina ===
Candy Ride did not officially race at age two. However, he made one start over 500 meters in General Cabrera, Cordoba on may 1st 2002 winning by 2 lengths. He went off as the favorite in his first official start at the Hipodromo Argentino on August 9, 2002 in a maiden race over 1,200 meters (roughly 6 furlongs) on the dirt. After tracking the early leader, he took the lead halfway through the race and continued to draw away to win by twelve lengths.

For his next start on October 12, Candy Ride was stepped up to the Group One level in the Gran Premio San Isidro at a distance of 1,600 meters (roughly one mile) on the turf. Going off at odds of 4–1 in a field of 11, he rated in fourth place then went to the lead with 2 1/2 furlongs remaining. He drew clear to win by 8 lengths.

Candy Ride made the final start of the year in the Gran Premio Joaquín S. de Anchorena, another Group 1 event at a distance of a 1,600 meters on the turf. He once again tracked the early pace and then moved to the lead with three furlongs to go. He won by eight lengths in a time of 1:31.01, a world record. His performances earned the colt Argentine Champion Miler honors.

=== 2003: in the United States ===
In January 2003, Candy Ride was purchased for US$900,000 by Americans Sid and Jenny Craig. The couple had previously met with great success with horses bought in Argentina, most notably with Paseana, who won the 1992 Breeders' Cup Distaff and was voted the Eclipse Award as American Champion Older Female Horse for 1992 and 1993. The Craigs sent Candy Ride into training with Hall of Famer Ron McAnally.

On June 7, 2003, Candy Ride made his American debut in an allowance race at Hollywood Park over 1 1/16 miles on the dirt. He dueled for the early lead then took the lead turning to home to win by three lengths. His next start was on July 4 as the even money favorite in the Grade II American Handicap at Hollywood Park at a distance of 1 1/8 on the turf. He and Special Ring raced heads apart for most of the race before Candy Ride finally pulled clear in the stretch to win by three-quarters of a length. "The jets got cranked up at the half-mile pole and they just kept cranking," said jockey Gary Stevens. "He gives me a heck of a good feeling."

In what turned out to be his last race, Candy Ride was entered in the Grade I Pacific Classic Stakes at Del Mar over a distance of 1 1/4 miles on the dirt. Medaglia d'Oro, the 3-5 favorite, went to the early lead and set moderate fractions of :23 2/5 for the first quarter-mile and :46 4/5 for the half. Candy Ride bobbled at the start but soon recovered to settle into second place. He took the lead turning for home and drew off to win by 3 1/4 lengths while setting a track record of 1:59:11. In beating the highly regarded (2nd), Candy Ride earned a Beyer speed figure of 123, the highest of any horse in the United States in 2003.

After inheriting the ride from an injured Gary Stevens, Julie Krone became the first female jockey to win a million dollar race. She credited Stevens for sharing his knowledge of the colt's idiosyncrasies, and wondered, "How good a horse is he? Wow! That's how good a horse he is. Amazing. He is a rocketship. I still can't believe this is real. Pulling up, I asked the pony rider to pinch me. I asked the clerk of scales if this was really happening."

Because Candy Ride was foaled in Argentina, his breeders had not nominated him for the Breeders' Cup and as such, the Craigs would have been required to pay an $800,000 supplemental fee if they wanted to run their horse in the Breeders' Cup Classic. McNally also noted that the colt's feet were very small and he wanted to remove the horseshoes to allow the feet to spread naturally. With a view to racing in 2004, Candy Ride was given some time off and returned to training in December 2003. However, a variety of issues kept delaying his return to racing, and he was retired to stud in August 2004.

== Stud record ==
Candy Ride's first crop, foaled in 2006, produced Grade 1 winners Evita Argentina, El Brujo, Capt. Candyman Can and Misremembered. Demonstrating Candy Ride's versatility as a sire, both Evita Argentina and Capt. Candyman were graded stakes winners at age two and went on to earn Grade I wins at age three over sprint distances in the La Brea Stakes and King's Bishop Stakes respectively. By contrast, Misremembered won the Santa Anita Handicap over 10 furlongs as a four-year-old.

From his 2007 crop, Sidney's Candy won the Santa Anita Derby and also set a track record for 1 1/16 miles on turf at Del Mar. In addition, Twirling Candy became a star on the West Coast in 2010 and 2011, winning multiple Grade I races on turf and dirt. John Sadler, who trained both Sidney's Candy and Twirling Candy, is quoted as saying that Twirling Candy is the best horse he's ever trained. Twirling Candy became the sire of 2021 Preakness Stakes winner Rombauer.

In 2010, Candy Ride was relocated to Lane's End, and has developed into a top 10 sire. Candy Ride's first champion was the ill-fated gelding Shared Belief, who was voted American Champion Two-Year-Old Male Horse in 2013 and won five Grade I stakes from ages 2 to 4.

More recently, Candy Ride has sired Gun Runner, who finished third in the 2016 Kentucky Derby and went on to win the Clark Handicap later that year. In 2017, Gun Runner was the American Horse of the Year after winning the Breeders' Cup Classic, Whitney Stakes and Woodward Stakes. Candy Ride finished second on the North American general sire lists in both 2017 and 2018. Gun Runner is the sire of 2022 Preakness Stakes winner Early Voting making Candy Ride the grandsire of two consecutive winners of that classic.

=== Notable progeny ===
His major stakes winners include:

c = colt, f = filly, g = gelding

| Foaled | Name | Sex | Grade I wins |
| 2006 | Capt. Candyman Can | c | King's Bishop Stakes |
| 2006 | El Brujo | c | Pat O'Brien Stakes |
| 2006 | Evita Argentina | f | La Brea Stakes |
| 2006 | Misremembered | c | Santa Anita Handicap |
| 2007 | Sidney's Candy | c | Santa Anita Derby |
| 2007 | Twirling Candy | c | Malibu Stakes |
| 2008 | Home Sweet Aspen | f | Santa Monica Stakes |
| 2011 | Shared Belief | g | 2013 Champion 2yo colt – Los Alamitos Futurity, 2014 Pacific Classic Stakes, Awesome Again Stakes, Malibu Stakes, 2015 Santa Anita Handicap |
| 2012 | Ascend | g | 2017 Manhattan Stakes |
| 2013 | Gun Runner | c | 2017 Horse of the Year – Stephen Foster Handicap, Whitney Handicap, Woodward Stakes, and Breeders' Cup Classic. 2018 Pegasus World Cup |
| 2013 | Leofric | c | Clark Handicap |
| 2014 | Mastery | c | Los Alamitos Futurity |
| 2015 | Ollie's Candy | f | 2019 Clement L. Hirsch |
| 2015 | Separationofpowers | f | 2017 Frizette Stakes, 2018 Test Stakes |
| 2016 | Vekoma | c | Carter Handicap, Metropolitan Handicap |
| 2017 | Game Winner | c | 2017 champion 2yo colt – Del Mar Futurity, American Pharoah, Breeders' Cup Juvenile |
| 2018 | Rock Your World | c | Santa Anita Derby |
| 2020 | Geaux Rocket Ride | c | Haskell Stakes |
| 2020 | Hit Show | c | Dubai World Cup |
| 2021 | Candied | f | Alcibiades Stakes |

Candy Ride's most notable progeny includes:

- Capt. Candyman Can: In 2008, won Iroquois Stakes (Churchill Downs). In 2009, won King's Bishop Stakes, Hutcheson Stakes, Bay Shore Stakes, Matt Winn Stakes.
- Misremembered: In 2009, won Los Alamitos Derby and Indiana Derby. In 2010, won Santa Anita Handicap.
- Twirling Candy: In 2010, won Malibu Stakes, Del Mar Derby, Oceanside Stakes. In 2011, won Strub Stakes.
- Sidney's Candy: In 2010, won Santa Anita Derby, San Vicente Stakes, San Felipe Stakes, La Jolla Handicap, Sir Beaufort Stakes.

== Pedigree ==
Pedigree of Candy Ride (ARG), bay stallion, foaled September 27, 1999
| Sire Ride The Rails dkb/br. 1991 | Cryptoclearance dkb/br. 1984 | Fappiano b. 1977 | Mr. Prospector |
| Sire Ride The Rails dkb/br. 1991 | Cryptoclearance dkb/br. 1984 | Fappiano b. 1977 | Killaloe |
| Sire Ride The Rails dkb/br. 1991 | Cryptoclearance dkb/br. 1984 | Naval Orange dkb/br. 1975 | Hoist The Flag |
| Sire Ride The Rails dkb/br. 1991 | Cryptoclearance dkb/br. 1984 | Naval Orange dkb/br. 1975 | Mock Orange |
| Sire Ride The Rails dkb/br. 1991 | Herbalesian b. 1969 | Herbager (FR) b. 1956 | Vandale (FR) |
| Sire Ride The Rails dkb/br. 1991 | Herbalesian b. 1969 | Herbager (FR) b. 1956 | Flagette (FR) |
| Sire Ride The Rails dkb/br. 1991 | Herbalesian b. 1969 | Alanesian b. 1954 | Polynesian |
| Sire Ride The Rails dkb/br. 1991 | Herbalesian b. 1969 | Alanesian b. 1954 | Alablue |
| Dam Candy Girl (ARG) ch. 1990 | Candy Stripes ch. 1982 | Blushing Groom (FR) ch. 1974 | Red God |
| Dam Candy Girl (ARG) ch. 1990 | Candy Stripes ch. 1982 | Blushing Groom (FR) ch. 1974 | Runaway Bride (GB) |
| Dam Candy Girl (ARG) ch. 1990 | Candy Stripes ch. 1982 | Bubble Company (FR) ch. 1977 | Lyphard |
| Dam Candy Girl (ARG) ch. 1990 | Candy Stripes ch. 1982 | Bubble Company (FR) ch. 1977 | Prodice (FR) |
| Dam Candy Girl (ARG) ch. 1990 | City Girl (ARG) ch. 1982 | Farnesio (ARG) b. 1974 | Good Manners |
| Dam Candy Girl (ARG) ch. 1990 | City Girl (ARG) ch. 1982 | Farnesio (ARG) b. 1974 | La Farnesina (ARG) |
| Dam Candy Girl (ARG) ch. 1990 | City Girl (ARG) ch. 1982 | Cithara (ARG) ch. 1975 | Utopico (ARG) |
| Dam Candy Girl (ARG) ch. 1990 | City Girl (ARG) ch. 1982 | Cithara (ARG) ch. 1975 | Cithere (FR) (Family 13-c) |

== See also ==
- List of leading Thoroughbred racehorses
