= Lawyer Ron =

American-bred Thoroughbred racehorse

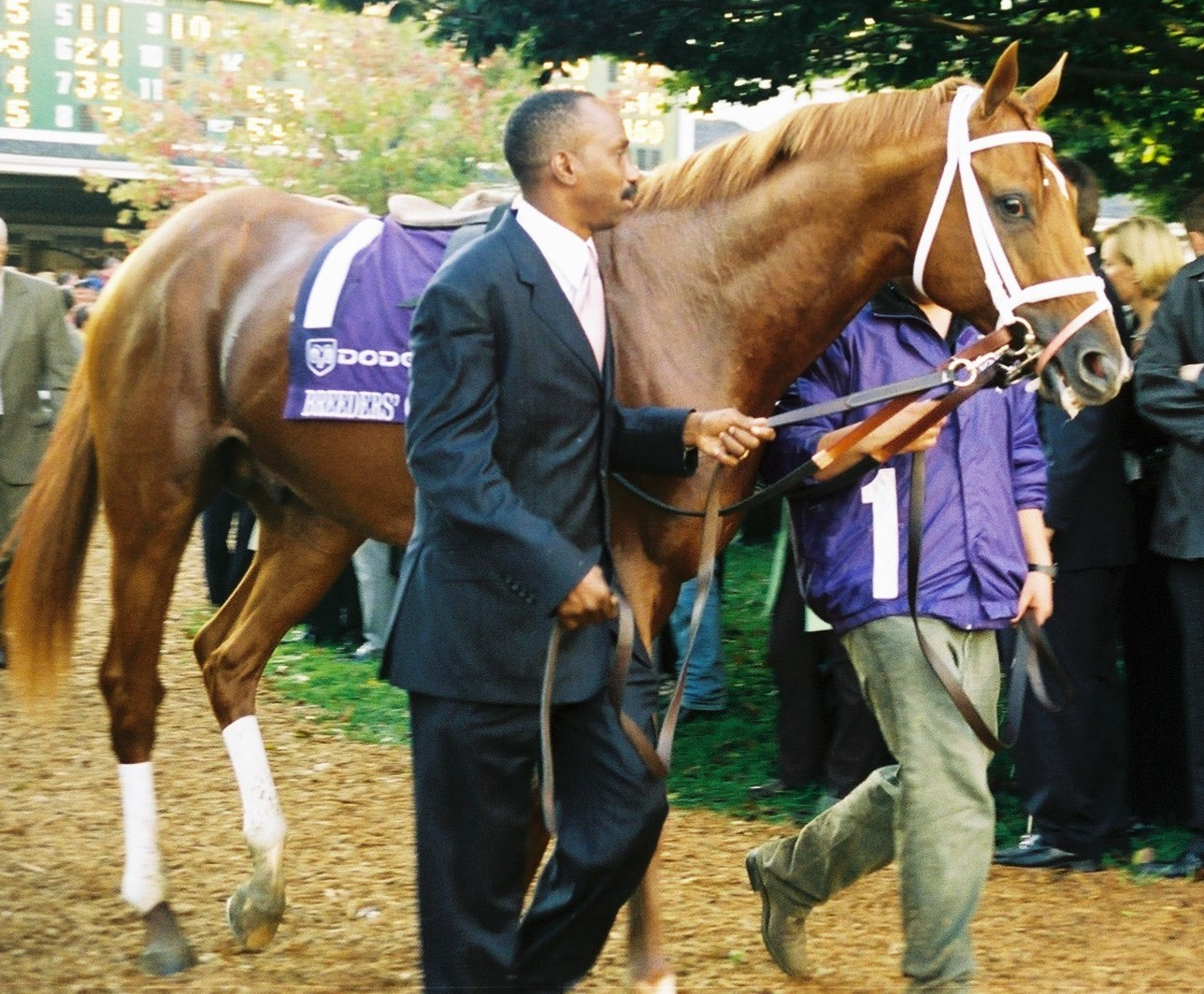
- Sire: Langfuhr
- Grandsire: Danzig
- Dam: Donation
- Damsire: Lord Avie
- Sex: Stallion
- Foaled: 2003
- Country: United States
- Colour: Chestnut
- Breeder: James T. Hines, Jr.
- Owner: James T. Hines, Jr. Stonewall Farm (May, 2006)
- Trainer: Bob Holthus; Todd Pletcher (October 2006)
- Record: 24: 12-4-4
- Earnings: $2,790,008

Major wins
- Diamond Joe Stakes (2005); Risen Star Stakes (2006); Southwest Stakes (2006); Rebel Stakes (2006); Arkansas Derby (2006); St. Louis Derby (2006); Oaklawn Handicap (2007); Whitney Handicap (2007); Woodward Stakes (2007)

Awards
- American Champion Older Male Horse (2007)
- Last updated on July 11, 2009

Lawyer Ron (March 1, 2003 – July 11, 2009) was an American thoroughbred race horse.

== Background ==
Lawyer Ron was bred and owned by James T. Hines Jr., an entrepreneur who started his first company, Premium Allied Tool, in Owensboro, Kentucky, in 1966 and turned it into a multimillion-dollar business. Hines became involved in thoroughbred horse racing in 1995 but died at the age of 69 in a drowning accident in his home swimming pool on February 20, 2006, just before Lawyer Ron's victory in the Rebel Stakes. The estate and Lawyer Ron's racing career were both managed by Mr. Hines' lawyer, Ron Bamberger, for whom the horse was named.

Stonewall Farm of Midway, Kentucky, bought a majority interest in Lawyer Ron in the week preceding the 2006 Kentucky Derby. He raced as a 4-year-old in 2007 under the banner of Hines Racing LLC, and stood at stud for Stonewall Stallions Farm after he retired.

== Racing career ==
Lawyer Ron broke his maiden on October 10, 2005, in a maiden race at Keeneland Race Course. It was his first race on a dirt track, and he won by 3 1/2 lengths. On December 9, 2005, in an allowance race at Louisiana Downs, Lawyer Ron drew away from the field to win by ten lengths. He then won the Diamond Joe Stakes at Evangeline Downs on December 31, 2005, by eight lengths.

Although Lawyer Ron dominated in races on the dirt, his performances on the turf and polytrack surfaces were mediocre. Overall he was 0–7 away from the dirt, finishing in the money only four times. However, he won nine of his next twelve races (and placed second in one) on dirt.

In the 2006 Grade III Risen Star Stakes held at Louisiana Downs on January 14, Lawyer Ron broke well and was second heading into the first turn. He stayed just to the outside of the leader, Mark of Success, before passing him early on the backstretch. Lawyer Ron and Mark of Success battled down the backstretch and into the final turn with Mark of Success on the inside and Lawyer Ron on the outside. Mark of Success continued to press Lawyer Ron for the lead early in the stretch until Lawyer Ron opened up and pulled away to an 8 length victory.

The 2006 Southwest Stakes was held on February 25 at Oaklawn Park featuring Lawyer Ron as the odds-on favorite. He broke strongly to take an early lead. Heading down the stretch, Steppenwolfer made a strong challenge for the lead, but Lawyer Ron held him off to win by 3/4 length.

In the 2006 Grade III Rebel Stakes held at Oaklawn Park on March 18, Lawyer Ron got a poor start and was trapped against the rail in fifth. Coming out of the first turn, he moved to the outside but remained in fifth down the backstretch. Under jockey John McKee, he made his move at the start of the second turn. Moving strongly up the field, he took the lead by the time he came out of the turn and won by three lengths.

The 2006 Arkansas Derby was a $1 million Grade II stakes race run at Oaklawn Park in Hot Springs, Arkansas, on April 15, 2006. Lawyer Ron was the odds-on favorite. Early in the race, he was bottled in between horses in fourth but moved up on the rail coming out of the first turn to gain the lead. Lawyer Ron was then challenged by Private Vow coming out of the second turn but pulled away and won by 2¾ lengths over a late-surging Steppenwolfer.

== Past Performances ==
In most of Lawyer Ron's victories, he jumped out to an early lead and set the pace. All of his wins were characterized by a strong driving finish. In the 2006 Rebel Stakes, Lawyer Ron demonstrated the ability to come from the back of the field as well. His ability to both start and close a race made him a favorite to win the 2006 Kentucky Derby, according to many experts. He left the gate in 6th place in the Derby but after the first turn moved quickly to 2nd place, where he remained down the long back side. He tired at the top of the stretch and finished 12th.

On August 25, 2006, Lawyer Ron won the inaugural running of the St. Louis Derby at Fairmount Park Race Track in Illinois.

Ridden by John Velazquez and hard to handle in the early part of the race, on September 30 Lawyer Ron lost to Curlin by a neck in a stretch duel in the Grade I Jockey Club Gold Cup at Belmont Park. Early in the race, he ran in second place behind the early fractions of 24:26, 47:88, and 1:11:66 set by Brother Bobby.

== Jockeys ==
Through his early racing career, while Bob Holthus was trainer, Lawyer Ron was ridden by John McKee, who called the colt one of the best horses he had ever ridden. McKee was the primary rider for Lawyer Ron's trainer, Bob Holthus. Prior to the 2006 Kentucky Derby, McKee had two Derby mounts: Greater Good in 2005 and Pro Prado in 2004.

Beginning in October 2006, Lawyer Ron was conditioned by multiple Eclipse Award winning trainer Todd Pletcher. On February 11, 2007, Lawyer Ron, who continued to be rank throughout his career (probably contributing to his loss in the 2006 Breeders' Cup Classic which went to Invasor), was ridden by jockey John Velazquez for an optional/allowance claiming race at Gulfstream Park. Velazquez kept control of the headstrong colt, forcing him to settle and then steady behind the field until finding his opening for the win.

In the $500,000 Oaklawn Handicap on April 7, 2007, Lawyer Ron was ridden for the first time by Edgar Prado. Although previously a headstrong horse, he settled early and moved to the lead on the outside passing the three-eighths pole and entered the stretch with a clear advantage. He pulled away to win by 4 lengths. Prado never used the whip on him.

John Velazquez rode him to a track record time of 1:46.64 in the 2007 Whitney Stakes and then again a few weeks later, in the Woodward Stakes, which he won over a fast track by 8 1/4 lengths in a time of 1:48.60. In late October, he finished seventh in the 2007 Breeders' Cup Classic at Monmouth Park Racetrack on a sloppy track.

== Death ==
In November 2007, Lawyer Ron retired with an initial stud fee of $30,000 at Stonewall Farm in Versailles, Kentucky. On July 11, 2009, he died from complications after colic surgery. At the age of six, he was standing his second season. His first crop of foals arrived in 2009.

== Races ==
Finish	Race	Distance	Track	Condition
7th	Breeders' Cup Classic	One and one-quarter miles	Monmouth Park	Sloppy
2nd	Jockey Club Gold Cup	One and one-quarter miles	Belmont Park	Fast
1st	Woodward Stakes	One and one-eighth miles	Saratoga Race Course	Fast
1st	Whitney Stakes	One and one-eighth miles	Saratoga Race Course	Fast
3rd	Salvator Mile Handicap	One mile	Monmouth Park	Fast
2nd	Metropolitan Handicap	One mile	Belmont Park	Fast
1st	Oaklawn Handicap	One and one-eighth miles	Oaklawn Park	Fast
1st	Optional/Allowance Claiming	One Mile	Gulfstream Park	Fast
9th	Breeders' Cup Classic	One and one quarter miles	Churchill Downs	Fast
1st	St. Louis Derby	One and One-Sixteenth Miles	Fairmount Park Race Track	Fast
12th	Kentucky Derby	One and One-Quarter Miles	Churchill Downs	Fast
1st	Arkansas Derby	One and One-Eighth Miles	Oaklawn Park	Fast
1st	Rebel Stakes	One and One-Sixteenth Miles	Oaklawn Park	Fast
1st	Southwest Stakes	One Mile	Oaklawn Park	Fast
1st	Risen Star Stakes	One and One-Sixteenth Miles	Fair Grounds Race Course at Louisiana Downs	Fast
1st	Diamond Jo Stakes	One Mile	Evangeline Downs	Fast
1st	Allowance Opitional Claiming	One Mile	Fair Grounds Race Course at Louisiana Downs	Fast
4th	Grand Canyon Handicap	One and One-Sixteenth Miles (Turf)	Churchill Downs	Firm
3rd	Allowance	One and One-Sixteenth Miles (Turf)	Churchill Downs	Firm
1st	Maiden	Seven Furlongs	Keeneland Race Course	Sloppy (Sealed)
5th	Maiden	Six and One-Half Furlongs	Turfway Park	Fast
2nd	Maiden Claimer	Six Furlongs	Turfway Park	Fast
7th	Maiden	One Mile (Turf)	Ellis Park Racecourse	Firm
3rd	Maiden	One Mile (Turf)	Ellis Park Racecourse	Firm
