= Mathis Mile Stakes =

- Class: Grade II
- Location: Santa Anita Park; Arcadia, California, United States
- Inaugurated: 2000 (as Sir Beaufort Stakes)
- Race type: Thoroughbred - Flat racing
- Sponsor: Mathis Brothers (since 2014)
- Website: Santa Anita Park

Race information
- Distance: 1 mile
- Surface: Turf
- Track: Left-handed
- Qualification: Three-year-olds
- Weight: 124 lbs with allowances
- Purse: $200,000 (since 2013)

The Mathis Mile Stakes is a Grade II American thoroughbred horse race for three-year-olds over a distance of one mile on the turf held annually in late December Santa Anita Park in Arcadia, California, USA. The event currently offers a purse of US$200,000.

== History ==
The inaugural running of the event was on 26 December 2000 as the Sir Beaufort Stakes, opening day of 2000–01 Santa Anita Park's Winter meeting. The event attracted eight entrants and was won by Edmund A. Gann's Fateful Dream, who was trained by US Hall of Fame trainer Bobby Frankel and ridden by US Hall of Fame jockey Kent Desormeaux by one length in a time of 1:35.01 on a turf course that was rated as firm.

The event was named after the 1993 Santa Anita Handicap winner Sir Beaufort.

In 2003 the event was moved off the turf and run on a dirt track.

In 2005 the event was run in split divisions.

The following year, 2006, the American Graded Stakes Committee classified the event as Grade III and in 2011 the event was upgraded again to Grade II.

Due to poor racecourse conditions as a result of wet weather, the race was switched to the synthetic track in 2008 and to the dirt track in 2010.

The event was renamed the Mathis Brothers Mile Stakes in 2014 under a marketing agreement between Santa Anita Park and Mathis Brothers Furniture.

The event was run once more on the dirt in 2021. However, after review the Grade II status was reinstated.

== Records ==
Speed record:

- 1 mile on turf: 1:33.46 - Bowies Hero (2017)
- 1 mile on turf: 1:33.70 - Sidney's Candy (2010)

Margins:

- 7 1/4 lengths - Sidney's Candy (2010)

Most wins by an owner:

- 2 - Triple B Farms (2004, 2005)

Most wins by a jockey:

- 3 - Kent Desormeaux (2000, 2005, 2017)
- 3 - Flavien Prat (2016, 2018, 2024)

Most wins by a trainer:

- 3 - Philip D'Amato (2016, 2017, 2024)

== Winners ==
| Year | Winner | Jockey | Trainer | Owner | Distance | Time | Purse | Grade | Ref |
|---|---|---|---|---|---|---|---|---|---|
Mathis Mile Stakes
| 2025 | Hiding in Honduras | Antonio Fresu | Jonathan Thomas | Robert V. LaPenta | 1 mile | 1:35.13 | $200,500 | II | |
| 2024 | King of Gosford | Flavien Prat | Philip D'Amato | Benowitz Family Trust, CYBT, Saul Gevertz, Michael Nentwig, Jeremy Peskoff | 1 mile | 1:34.49 | $201,000 | II | |
| 2023 | Watsonville | Antonio Fresu | Mark Glatt | Pine Racing Stables & Saints or Sinners | 1 mile | 1:34.55 | $200,500 | II | |
Santa Anita Mathis Mile Stakes
| 2022 | One More Bid | Ramon Vazquez | Ryan Hanson | California Racing Partners, Ciaglia Racing & Ryan Hanson | 1 mile | 1:33.67 | $201,000 | II | |
| 2021 | Law Professor | Jose Ortiz | Michael McCarthy | Twin Creeks Racing Stable | 1 mile | 1:37.41 | $201,500 | II | Off turf |
Mathis Brothers Mile Stakes
| 2020 | Smooth Like Strait | Umberto Rispoli | Michael McCarthy | Cannon Thoroughbreds | 1 mile | 1:33.51 | $201,000 | II | |
| 2019 | Mo Forza | Joel Rosario | Peter L. Miller | Bardy Farm & OG Boss | 1 mile | 1:34.26 | $202,106 | II | |
| 2018 | River Boyne (IRE) | Flavien Prat | Jeff Mullins | Red Baron's Barn & Rancho Temescal | 1 mile | 1:34.52 | $201,725 | II | |
| 2017 | Bowies Hero | Kent J. Desormeaux | Philip D'Amato | Agave Racing Stable | 1 mile | 1:33.46 | $201,035 | II | |
| 2016 | Conquest Enforcer | Flavien Prat | Philip D'Amato | Loooch Racing, Imaginary Stables & Raquel Ritchie | 1 mile | 1:33.64 | $201,725 | II | |
| 2015 | Om | Gary L. Stevens | Dan L. Hendricks | Sareen Family Trust | 1 mile | 1:35.57 | $201,500 | II | |
| 2014 | Alert Bay | Tyler Baze | Blaine D. Wright | Peter Redekop | 1 mile | 1:35.06 | $201,250 | II | |
Sir Beaufort Stakes
| 2013 | Gervinho | Rafael Bejarano | Carla Gaines | Glen Hill Farm | 1 mile | 1:33.47 | $201,000 | II | |
| 2012 | Silentio | Rafael Bejarano | Gary Mandella | Wertheimer et Frère | 1 mile | 1:34.27 | $150,750 | II | |
| 2011 | Mr. Commons | Mike E. Smith | John Shirreffs | St. George Farm Racing | 1 mile | 1:33.84 | $150,000 | II | |
| 2010 | Sidney's Candy | Joel Rosario | John W. Sadler | Craig Family Trust | 1 mile | 1:33.70 | $150,000 | III | |
| 2009 | The Usual Q. T. | Victor Espinoza | James M. Cassidy | Don Van Racing, Michael Nentwig, George Saadeh & Jeffrey Byer | 1 mile | 1:34.58 | $100,000 | III | |
| 2008 | Gio Ponti | Garrett K. Gomez | Christophe Clement | Castleton Lyons | 1 mile | 1:34.92 | $100,000 | III | |
| 2007 | Monterey Jazz | David R. Flores | Craig Dollase | A and R Stables & Class Racing Stable | 1 mile | 1:34.36 | $122,100 | III | |
| 2006 | Kip Deville | Richard Migliore | Richard E. Dutrow Jr. | IEAH Stables, Dan Borislew, Andrew Cohen, et al. | 1 mile | 1:36.12 | $114,300 | III | |
| 2005 | Chinese Dragon | Kent J. Desormeaux | Robert B. Hess Jr. | Michael Carter, Richard T. Hale Jr., Roncelli Family Trust et al. | 1 mile | 1:35.09 | $84,500 | Listed | Division 1 |
| 2005 | Tedo (GER) | Corey Nakatani | Doug F. O'Neill | Triple B Farms | 1 mile | 1:34.34 | $86,500 | Listed | Division 2 |
| 2004 | Whilly (IRE) | Felipe F. Martinez | Doug F. O'Neill | Triple B Farms | 1 mile | 1:36.60 | $112,700 | Listed | |
| 2003 | Buckland Manor | Corey Nakatani | J. Paco Gonzalez | Trudy McCaffery & John Toffan | 1 mile | 1:36.08 | $78,000 | Listed | |
| 2002 | Inesperado (FR) | Pat Valenzuela | Robert J. Frankel | 3 Plus U Stable | 1 mile | 1:35.82 | $78,050 | Listed | |
| 2001 | Orientate | Chris McCarron | D. Wayne Lukas | Robert & Beverly Lewis | 1 mile | 1:36.39 | $77,400 | Listed | |
| 2000 | Fateful Dream | Kent J. Desormeaux | Robert J. Frankel | Edmund A. Gann | 1 mile | 1:35.01 | $76,175 | Listed | |

Legend:
All Weather Track Dirt Turf

== See also ==
List of American and Canadian Graded races
