= La Jolla Handicap =

- Class: Listed
- Location: Del Mar Racetrack; Del Mar, California
- Inaugurated: 1937
- Race type: Thoroughbred – flat racing
- Website: Del Mar

Race information
- Distance: 1 1/16 miles
- Surface: Turf
- Track: left-handed
- Qualification: Three-year-olds
- Weight: Handicap
- Purse: $150,000 (2021)

The La Jolla Handicap is a Listed American Thoroughbred horse race for three-year-olds over a distance of one and one-sixteenth miles on the turf scheduled annually in August at Del Mar Racetrack in Del Mar, California. The event currently carries a purse of $150,000.

== History ==
The event is named for the city of La Jolla, California, which is not far from Del Mar.

The event was inaugurated on July 11, 1937, as an event for three-year-olds and older and was won by the five-year-old mare Topsy Omar by the shortest of margins defeating the favorite Grey Count in a time of 1:45 2/5. The event was not run in 1939 but moved to early February 1940 to Santa Anita as a seven furlong event for four-year-olds and older on the turf. The champion Seabiscuit resumed in this event after a long layoff carrying 128 pounds after injury and was placed third to Heelfly. Later in the year the event was run at Del Mar at the set distance of one mile.

The event was idle during 1942–1944 due to World War II, resuming in 1945 as a three-year-olds and older California bred handicap.

In 1950 the event's conditions were set for three-year-olds at the distance.

In 1973 the event was classified as Grade III and in 1975 was moved to the turf track and has been run since then on that surface. In 1987 the event's distance was extended from one mile to 1 1/16 miles. From 2004 to 2013 the event was run as a Grade II.

In 2024 the event was downgraded by the Thoroughbred Owners and Breeders Association to Listed status.

The event's position in the racing calendar at Del Mar has led to the race being a preparatory race for the Del Mar Derby which is scheduled usually several weeks later.

The event has been split into division four times, the last being in 1982.

Two fillies or mares have won this event. The inaugural running in 1937 and Henpecker in 1948 when the event was restricted to three-year-old fillies.

== Records ==
Speed record:

- 1 1/16 miles: 1:39.52 – Sidney's Candy (2010)
- 1 mile (dirt): 1:34.20 – Groshawk (1973)
- 1 mile (turf): 1:34.60 – Floating Reserve (1985)

Margins:

- 5 1/2 lengths – Sidney's Candy (2010)

Most wins by a jockey:

- 7 – Chris McCarron (1980, 1981, 1982, 1984, 1987, 1989, 1993)

Most wins by a trainer:

- 4 – Farrell Jones (1962, 1971, 1974, 1975)

Most wins by an owner:

- 4 – Red Baron's Barn & Rancho Temescal (2014, 2018, 2021, 2023)

La Jolla Handicap – Del Mar Derby double:

- Big Raff (1963)
- Lightning Mandate (1974)
- Larrikin (1975)
- Relaunch (1979)
- Tanks Brigade (1983)
- Vernon Castle (1986)
- Tight Spot (1990)
- Ladies Din (1998)
- Inesperado (FR) (2002)
- Free Rose (2016)
- Sharp Samurai (2017)

== Winners ==
Year	Winner	Age	Jockey	Trainer	Owner	Distance	Time	Purse	Grade	Ref
At Del Mar – La Jolla Handicap
2024	Stay Hot	3	Antonio Fresu	Peter Eurton	Burns Racing, Exline-Border Racing, SAF Racing, The Estate of Brereton C. Jones & William D. Hudock	1 1/16 miles	1:40.98	$100,000	Listed	
2023	Maltese Falcon (IRE)	3	Juan Hernandez	Leonard Powell	Red Baron's Barn & Rancho Temescal	1 1/16 miles	1:44.20	$151,500	III	
2022	Cabo Spirit	3	Joe Bravo	George Papaprodromou	Kretz Racing	1 1/16 miles	1:42.28	$150,500	III	
2021	₫Zoffarelli (IRE)	3	Drayden Van Dyke	Jeff Mullins	Red Baron's Barn & Rancho Temescal	1 1/16 miles	1:42.27	$150,500	III	
2020	Smooth Like Strait	3	Umberto Rispoli	Michael W. McCarthy	Cannon Thoroughbreds	1 1/16 miles	1:40.29	$126,500	III	
2019	Kingly	3	Mario Gutierrez	Bob Baffert	Clearview Stables, RAC 04 Racing & Michael Meegan	1 1/16 miles	1:39.95	$151,053	III	
2018	River Boyne (IRE)	3	Flavien Prat	Jeff Mullins	Red Baron's Barn & Rancho Temescal	1 1/16 miles	1:40.93	$150,345	III	
2017	Sharp Samurai	3	Gary L. Stevens	Mark Glatt	Red Baron's Barn, Rancho Temescal & Mark Glatt	1 1/16 miles	1:41.51	$151,035	III	
2016	Free Rose	3	Joseph Talamo	Richard Baltas	Abbondanza Racing	1 1/16 miles	1:40.73	$151,275	III	
2015	Prospect Park	3	Kent J. Desormeaux	Clifford W. Sise Jr.	Pam & Martin Wygod	1 1/16 miles	1:41.54	$151,000	III	
2014	Enterprising	3	Mike E. Smith	Thomas F. Proctor	Glen Hill Farm	1 1/16 miles	1:41.31	$150,250	III	
2013	Dice Flavor	3	Garrett K. Gomez	Patrick Gallagher	Oda Racing Stable & US Equine	1 1/16 miles	1:39.82	$151,000	II	
2012	Old Time Hockey	3	Joseph Talamo	Thomas F. Proctor	Glen Hill Farm	1 1/16 miles	1:40.55	$147,000	II	
2011	Burns	3	Pat Valenzuela	Barry Abrams	Madeline Auerbach & Alfred Pais	1 1/16 miles	1:42.36	$150,000	II	
2010	Sidney's Candy	3	Joel Rosario	John W. Sadler	Craig Family Trust	1 1/16 miles	1:39.52	$150,000	II	
2009	Meteore	3	Alex O. Solis	Richard E. Mandella	Wertheimer et Frère	1 1/16 miles	1:40.82	$150,000	II	
2008	Sky Cape	3	Joel Rosario	Kristin Mulhall	Visionary Racing & Steve Taub	1 1/16 miles	1:40.92	$150,000	II	
2007	† Worldly (GB)	3	Michael Baze	Ben D. A. Cecil	Christopher Wright	1 1/16 miles	1:42.57	$150,000	II	
2006	A. P. Warrior	3	David R. Flores	John Shirreffs	Stan E. Fulton	1 1/16 miles	1:40.71	$150,000	II	
2005	Willow O Wisp	3	Garrett K. Gomez	Vladimir Cerin	Robert A. Alexander	1 1/16 miles	1:41.45	$150,000	II	
2004	Blackdoun (FR)	3	Corey Nakatani	Julio C. Canani	Marsha Naify & Woodside Farms	1 1/16 miles	1:41.03	$150,000	II	
2003	Singletary	3	Pat Valenzuela	Don Chatlos	Little Red Feather Racing	1 1/16 miles	1:40.39	$150,000	III	
2002	Inesperado (FR)	3	Eddie Delahoussaye	Robert J. Frankel	3 Plus U Stable	1 1/16 miles	1:43.92	$147,000	III	
2001	Marine (GB)	3	Corey Nakatani	Robert J. Frankel	Juddmonte Farms	1 1/16 miles	1:41.72	$150,000	III	
2000	Purely Cozzene	3	David R. Flores	Bob Baffert	Ed & Natalie Friendly	1 1/16 miles	1:41.50	$150,000	III	
1999	Eagleton	3	Isaias D. Enriquez	Kevin Lewis	Dennis E. Weir	1 1/16 miles	1:41.89	$150,000	III	
1998	Ladies Din	3	Gary L. Stevens	Julio C. Canani	Terrence J. Lanni, Bernard Schiappa & Mike Sloan	1 1/16 miles	1:41.94	$136,350	III	
1997	Fantastic Fellow	3	Alex O. Solis	D. Wayne Lukas	The Thoroughbred Corporation	1 1/16 miles	1:43.43	$135,450	III	
1996	Ambivalent	3	René R. Douglas	J. Michael Orman	Ted C. Ford	1 1/16 miles	1:43.34	$132,850	III	
1995	Pétionville	3	Corey Nakatani	Randy K. Bradshaw	Everest Stables	1 1/16 miles	1:44.26	$130,850	III	
1994	Marvin's Faith (IRE)	3	Chris Antley	Ian P. D. Jory	Marvin Malmuth	1 1/16 miles	1:42.38	$107,800	III	
1993	Manny's Prospect	3	Chris McCarron	Michael R. Smith	Clover Creek Ranch	1 1/16 miles	1:42.12	$109,700	III	
1992	Blacksburg	3	Kent J. Desormeaux	D. Wayne Lukas	Overbrook Farm	1 1/16 miles	1:41.60	$109,700	III	
1991	Track Monarch	3	Pat Valenzuela	Darrell Vienna	David S. Milch	1 1/16 miles	1:41.91	$106,400	III	
1990	Tight Spot	3	Eddie Delahoussaye	Ron McAnally	Anderson, VHW Stable, et al.	1 1/16 miles	1:41.80	$107,600	III	
1989	River Master	3	Chris McCarron	Charles E. Whittingham	Cardiff Stud, Red Baron's Barn & Timestable	1 1/16 miles	1:42.60	$110,100	III	
1988	Perfecting	3	Gary L. Stevens	Laz Barrera	Harbor View Farm	1 1/16 miles	1:41.60	$109,800	III	
1987	The Medic	3	Chris McCarron	Gary F. Jones	Dr. E. Giammarino	1 1/16 miles	1:42.20	$100,000	III	
La Jolla Mile Handicap
1986	Vernon Castle	3	Eddie Delahoussaye	John Sullivan	Allen E. Paulson	1 mile	1:35.20	$105,600	III	
1985	Floating Reserve	3	Pat Valenzuela	Joseph Manzi	Robert E. Hibbert	1 mile	1:34.60	$98,300	III	
1984	Tights	3	Chris McCarron	Laz Barrera	Mill House Stable	1 mile	1:35.60	$101,000	III	
1983	Tanks Brigade	3	Eddie Delahoussaye	Joseph Manzi	Lee, Manzi & Ozer	1 mile	1:35.80	$83,900	III	
1982	Hugabay	3	Kenneth D. Black	Jesse C. Newsom	Melvin Ross	1 mile	1:35.60	$55,550	III	Division 1
1982	Take the Floor	3	Chris McCarron	John Gosden	Jason & Scott Beck	1 mile	1:35.60	$55,550	III	Division 2
La Jolla Mile Stakes
1981	Minnesota Chief	3	Chris McCarron	Leonard Dorfman	Larkin & Stames	1 mile	1:35.20	$67,950	III	
1980	Aristocratical	3	Chris McCarron	Edwin J. Gregson	Leone J. Peters	1 mile	1:36.20	$55,350	III	
1979	Relaunch	3	Laffit Pincay Jr.	John H. Adams	Glen Hill Farm	1 mile	1:35.40	$43,600	III	
1978	Singular	3	Darrel G. McHargue	Edwin J. Gregson	Jan Siegel	1 mile	1:35.80	$38,900	III	
1977	Stone Point	3	Marco Castaneda	Charles E. Whittingham	Howard B. Keck	1 mile	1:35.80	$32,350	III	
1976	Today 'N Tomorrow	3	Donald Pierce	Roger E. Clapp	Connie M. Ring	1 mile	1:35.80	$32,900	III	
1975	Larrikin	3	Donald Pierce	Farrell W. Jones	Joseph Morjoseph	1 mile	1:35.00	$28,100	III	
1974	Lightning Mandate	3	Álvaro Pineda	Farrell W. Jones	Farrell W. Jones & Mrs. Norman Z. McLeod	1 mile	1:34.40	$27,050	III	
1973	Groshawk	3	Bill Shoemaker	Charles E. Whittingham	Mr. & Mrs. Quinn Martin	1 mile	1:34.20	$27,550	III	
1972	Solar Salute	3	William Mahorney	Louis Glauberg	Mr. & Mrs. John J. Elmore	1 mile	1:34.40	$26,800		
1971	Petes Ruler	3	William Mahorney	Henry E. Moreno	Jules Biharile	1 mile	1:35.20	$16,625		Division 1
1971	Great Career	3	Jerry Lambert	Farrell W. Jones	Mr. & Mrs. John C. Mabee	1 mile	1:35.60	$16,625		Division 2
1970	Sugar Loaf	3	Fernando Toro	Dale K. Landers	Mrs. K. Dudley Malloy	1 mile	1:34.40	$22,400		
1969	Eagle Fly	3	Merlin Volzke	William B. Finnegan	Jack Schwabacher	1 mile	1:35.20	$19,025		
1968	Baffle	3	Bill Hartack	Johnny Longden	Frank M. McMahon	1 mile	1:35.40	$17,150		
1967	Jungle Road	3	Jack Robinson	Johnny Longden	Frank M. McMahon	1 mile	1:34.60	$19,525		
1966	Embassy	3	Robert L. Menell	Mesh Tenney	Rex C. Ellsworth	1 mile	1:35.40	$16,625		
1965	Mr. Payne	3	Jerry Lambert	Michael E. Millerick	Klipstein Stable	1 mile	1:35.40	$13,600		Division 1
1965	Hoist Bar	3	Bill Hartack	Noble Threewitt	Ben Canter	1 mile	1:35.80	$13,600		Division 2
1964	Royal Eiffel	3	Jerry Lambert	Michael E. Millerick	Mr. & Mrs. Harry S. Hart	1 mile	1:35.80	$16,450		
1963	Top Light	3	Jackie Leonard	Charles A. Comiskey	Robert S. LeSage	1 mile	1:36.20	$13,600		Division 1
1963	Big Raff	3	Rudy Campas	John H. Adams	Ralph Lowe	1 mile	1:35.80	$13,600		Division 2
1962	Testum	3	Dean C. Hall	Farrell W. Jones	Schilz & Anderson	1 mile	1:35.40	$16,025		
1961	Apple	3	Emile Ohayon	Joseph S. Dunn	Howard B. Keck	1 mile	1:35.20	$16,575		
1960	Our Rulla	3	Johnny Longden	Fred Houghton	Mrs. John D. Hertz	1 mile	1:35.00	$16,550		
1959	King Ara	3	Donald Pierce	Richard L. Crosby	Mr. & Mrs. Richard L. Crosby	1 mile	1:35.40	$16,075		
1958	Sir Ruler	3	George Taniguchi	Joseph S. Dunn	Howard B. Keck & Claiborne Farm	1 mile	1:36.60	$16,175		
La Jolla Handicap
1957	No Bumps	3	Warren Ferguson	Victor Cowdell	Harry James & Betty Grable James	1 mile	1:36.80	$16,500		
1956	Blen Host	3	Ralph Neves	Bob R. Roberts	Gazelle Stable	1 mile	1:37.00	$16,525		
1955	Hillary	3	Gordon Glisson	William B. Finnegan	El Peco Ranch	1 mile	1:35.40	$11,375		
1954	Leterna	3	William Harmatz	Keith L. Stucki	Triple K Stable	1 mile	1:36.00	$11,150		
1953	Threesome	3	Joseph Phillippi	J. Thomas Taylor	J. Thomas Taylor	1 mile	1:36.40	$11,250		
1952	Arroz	3	Bill Shoemaker	Wally Dunn	Mrs. Gordon Guiberson	1 mile	1:37.40	$11,375		
1951	Oats	3	Gordon Glisson	W. H. Tyree	J. A. Lyons	1 mile	1:37.80	$11,150		
1950	§ Blue Reading	3	Billy Pearson	Robert H. McDaniel	Mr. & Mrs. Clement L. Hirsch	1 mile	1:36.00	$11,525		
1949	Dinner Gong	4	Ralph Neves	Frank E. Childs	Abraham Hirschberg	1 mile	1:36.00	$11,225	3YO & older	
1948	ƒ Henpecker	3	John Gilbert	William Molter	Mrs. Harry Curland	1 mile	1:37.80	$10,950	‡3YO fillies	
1947	Handlebars	3	Lester Balaski	Charles Irby	Mrs. R. F. Black	1 mile	1:38.40	$8,150	♯3YO Cal Bred	
1946	§ First To Fight	5	Hubert Trent	Haskell E. Ross	L. J. Montgomery	1 mile	1:37.40	$8,280	¶3YO+ Cal Bred	
1945	Gold Boom	4	Francis Zehr	Robert R. Tilden	Sunland Stable	1 mile	1:37.60	$5,585	¶3YO+ Cal Bred	
1942–1944		Race not held								
1941	Vain Grove	4	Ferril Zufelt	Charles T. Leavitt	G. W. Lawless	1 mile	1:37.80	$2,500	¶3YO+ Cal Bred	
1940	Justice M.	3	Eugene A. Rodriguez	Harry M. Unna	Harry M. Unna	1 mile	1:37.20	$2,170	♯3YO Cal Bred	August
At Santa Anita racetrack
1940	Heelfly	6	George Woolf	Sylvester E. Veitch	Circle S. Stable	7 furlongs	1:23.00	$2,000	°4YO & older	February
1939	Race moved to 9 February 1940 at Santa Anita Racetrack									
At Del Mar racetrack
1938	Dogaway	4	Eddie Yager	William B. Finnegan	Robert Riskin	1 mile	1:37.20	$2,210	3YO & older	
1937	ƒ Topsy Omar	5	Tim Sena	Cecil Wilhelm	Mrs. Theresa Loeff	1 1/16 miles	1:45.40	$1,680	3YO & older	

Legend:
Dirt Turf
Notes:
§ Ran as an entry
ƒ Filly or Mare
₫ In the 2021 running of the event Sword Zorro (IRE) finished first by a nose in a photo finish but bumped the second-placed finisher Zoffarelli (IRE) from his inside when drifting out under left-handed urging by his jockey Umberto Rispoli and was disqualified. Zoffarelli (IRE) was declared the winner.
† In the 2007 running of the event Medici Code was first past the post and wagering was paid out as the winner, however the horse returned a positive swab for an excess amount of Clenbuterol and consequently was disqualified from the prizemoney and was placed eighth (last). Worldly was declared the official winner of the event.
‡ In 1948 the event was for three-year-old fillies
♯ In August 1940 and 1947 the event was for three-year-olds that were bred in California
¶ In 1941, 1945 and 1946 the event was for three-year-olds and older that were bred in California
°In February 1940 for four-year-olds and older

== See also ==
- List of American and Canadian Graded races
