= Jenny Craig (businesswoman) =

American businesswoman (born 1932)

- Born: Genevieve Guidroz; August 7, 1932 (age 94); Berwick, Louisiana
- Occupation: Business executive
- Known for: Jenny Craig, Inc.
- Spouse: Sidney Craig (m. 1979; died 2008)

Genevieve Marie Craig (née Guidroz; born August 7, 1932) is an American businesswoman who co-founded the weight loss, weight management, and nutrition company Jenny Craig, Inc. Craig was born in Berwick, Louisiana, was raised in New Orleans, and married Sidney Craig in 1979. In 1983, she and her husband created their weight management company in Australia. They began offering similar programs in the United States in 1985. The company was purchased by Nestlé Nutrition in 2006 for $600 million.

== Philanthropy ==
In 1992, Craig and her husband committed $10 million to Fresno State University for its School of Business and Administrative Services, later renamed the Sid Craig School of Business. In 1996, the couple committed another $10 million to the University of San Diego, $7 million of which was used to build the Jenny Craig Pavilion, a recreation and sports pavilion that was dedicated in October 2000. In 2022, Craig pledged $5 million to the National WWII Museum in New Orleans.

== Horse racing ==
In 1995, Craig and her husband bought a thoroughbred horse ranch and breeding operation in Rancho Santa Fe, California, formerly owned by sportsman Gene Klein. This area is home to the Del Mar Thoroughbred Club. Craig has been involved in racing and she and her husband have owned a number of successful thoroughbreds. One of their colts, Dr. Devious, finished seventh in the 1992 Kentucky Derby and also raced in England, where he won the 1992 Epsom Derby. That same year, their future National Museum of Racing and Hall of Fame filly Paseana won the Breeders' Cup Distaff at Gulfstream Park. In 2003, their horse Candy Ride won six races in a row including the Grade I Pacific Classic Stakes in which he set a new Del Mar track record for one and a quarter miles. Another Craig owned horse, Sidney's Candy, named after Sid Craig, ran in the 2010 Kentucky Derby.

== Health issues ==
In April 1995, while napping in an armchair, she was startled awake, triggering a medical anomaly that mimicked lockjaw but was not, as Craig was eventually able to pry her mouth open. Craig's condition gradually worsened, making it difficult for her to speak and eat. Her dentist diagnosed temporomandibular joint dysfunction. In the spring of 1998, she was diagnosed as having atrophy of her mouth muscles. Corrective surgery was performed, including installing bio-absorbable screws into her cheeks. She then underwent a year of speech therapy. Craig has since fully recovered from the debilitating condition.
