= Sidney's Candy =

American Thoroughbred racehorse

- Sire: Candy Ride
- Grandsire: Ride The Rails
- Dam: Fair Exchange
- Damsire: Storm Cat
- Sex: Colt
- Foaled: 2007
- Country: United States
- Colour: Chestnut
- Breeder: Sidney & Jenny Craig
- Owner: Serdar Özçolak, Tarık Tekçe, İbrahim Açıksöz
- Trainer: John W. Sadler
- Record: 11: 6-2-0
- Earnings: $893,560

Major wins
- San Vicente Stakes (2010); San Felipe Stakes (2010); Santa Anita Derby (2010); La Jolla Handicap (2010); Sir Beaufort Stakes (2010); Fourstardave Handicap (2011)

Sidney's Candy (foaled January 27, 2007 in Kentucky) is an American Thoroughbred racehorse. He is sired by Candy Ride out of the Storm Cat mare Fair Exchange. He was named after Sidney Craig.

== Racing career ==
Sidney's Candy set a new track record for 5 1/2 furlongs (1:02.71) in his maiden win on August 22, 2009, at Del Mar. He was sent to the sidelines following the race due to sore shins. He returned to the track in an allowance race at Santa Anita on December 30 and finished fourth after hopping and stumbling at the start.

He began his three-year-old season with a victory in the seven-furlong GII San Vicente Stakes. He followed that up with a half-length victory in the 1 1/16-mile GII San Felipe Stakes, beating previously undefeated graded stakes winner Caracortado.

Sidney's Candy won the first Grade I of his career when he wired the field in the 2010 Santa Anita Derby, winning by 4 1/2 lengths under jockey Joe Talamo. It was the first Santa Anita Derby victory for Talamo and Southern California-based trainer John W. Sadler.

Sidney's Candy started in the 20th position at the 2010 Kentucky Derby.

On July 31, 2011, Sidney's Candy (now owned by WinStar Farm and the Rubio B Stable), won the Fourstardave Handicap.

== Pedigree ==
Pedigree of Sidney's Candy
Sire Candy Ride (ARG)	Ride the Rails	Cryptoclearance	Fappiano
Sire Candy Ride (ARG)	Ride the Rails	Cryptoclearance	Naval Orange
Sire Candy Ride (ARG)	Ride the Rails	Herbalesian	Herbager (FR)
Sire Candy Ride (ARG)	Ride the Rails	Herbalesian	Alanesian
Sire Candy Ride (ARG)	Candy Girl (ARG)	Candy Stripes	Blushing Groom (FR)
Sire Candy Ride (ARG)	Candy Girl (ARG)	Candy Stripes	Bubble Company (FR)
Sire Candy Ride (ARG)	Candy Girl (ARG)	City Girl (ARG)	Farnesio (ARG)
Sire Candy Ride (ARG)	Candy Girl (ARG)	City Girl (ARG)	Cithara (ARG)
Dam Fair Exchange	Storm Cat	Storm Bird	Northern Dancer
Dam Fair Exchange	Storm Cat	Storm Bird	South Ocean
Dam Fair Exchange	Storm Cat	Terlingua	Secretariat
Dam Fair Exchange	Storm Cat	Terlingua	Crimson Saint
Dam Fair Exchange	Exchange	Explodent	Nearctic
Dam Fair Exchange	Exchange	Explodent	Venomous
Dam Fair Exchange	Exchange	Wooly Willow	Irish Stronghold
Dam Fair Exchange	Exchange	Wooly Willow	Crelita
