= St. Louis Derby =

Horse race

The St. Louis Derby run at Fairmount Park Racetrack in Collinsville, Illinois held its inaugural race on August 26, 2006. Open to three-year-old thoroughbred horses of either gender, and run at one and one sixteenth miles on the dirt, this ungraded stakes race offers a purse of $250,000, funded privately by local business men.

Inaugurated in 1926, the race was called the Fairmount Derby. It ran until 1930 after which it did not return until 1967 and for a time achieved Grade III status. It was last run in 2006. Following this hiatus, it was reintroduced in 2021 as the FanDuel Saint Louis Derby with a $250,000 prize pool and has been run yearly in the month of August since.

Sharons Beach after winning the 2026 St. Louis Derby with Jockey Rajiv Maragh

== Past winners ==
- 2026 - Sharons Beach
- 2025 - Disco Time
- 2024 - EJ Won The Cup
- 2023 - Tabeguache
- 2022 - Rattle N Roll
- 2021 - Flash of Mischief
- 2007 through 2020 - NOT RUN
- 2006 - Lawyer Ron
- 1996 through 2005 - NOT RUN
- 1995 - Strawberry Wine
- 1994 - Silver Goblin (Millionaire Oklahoma-Bred stakes winner.)
- 1993 - Adhocracy
- 1992 - Count The Time
- 1991 - Discover
- 1989 - Andover Man
- 1988 - Primal (Millionaire stakes winner, including Grade I Donn Handicap.)
- 1987 - Parochial
- 1986 - Goshen Store
- 1985 - Smile (Millionaire and American Champion Sprint Horse, 1986.) (Clever Allemont, winner of the 1985 Rebel Stakes and Southwest Stakes, came in third. In 2008, 26-year-old Clever Allemont was rescued from slaughter.)
- 1984 - Big Pistol (stakes winner of Grade I Haskell Invitational Handicap.)
- 1983 - Hail to Rome
- 1982 - Northern Majesty
- 1981 - Pocket Zipper (stakes winner of Grade I American Derby.)
- 1970 - Robin's Bug (Maryland Horse of the Year, 1970.)
- 1969 - Barely Once (Illinois Horse of the Year, 1970.)
- 1968 - Blarney Kiss
- 1967 - English Muffin
- Discontinued for 37 years
- 1930 - Gallant Knight (stakes winner of Latonia Derby, 2nd in Kentucky Derby.)
- 1929 - Karl Eitel
- 1928 - Misstep (stakes winner of the Arlington Handicap, 2nd in Kentucky Derby.)
- 1927 - Buddy Bauer (Kentucky Derby winner Whiskery finished second.)
- 1926 - Haste (stakes winner of the Withers Stakes.)
