= A.P. Warrior =

American-bred Thoroughbred racehorse

- Sire: A.P. Indy
- Grandsire: Seattle Slew
- Dam: Warrior Queen
- Damsire: Quiet American
- Sex: Stallion
- Foaled: 2003
- Country: United States
- Colour: Dark Bay
- Breeder: Jim Fleming
- Owner: Stanley E. Fulton
- Trainer: John Shirreffs
- Record: 13: 4-2-3
- Earnings: $548,595

Major wins
- San Felipe Stakes (2003); La Jolla Handicap (2003)

A.P. Warrior (foaled February 24, 2003 in Kentucky) is a thoroughbred race horse who was a Kentucky Derby contender in 2006 and Grade II winner on both dirt and turf.

== Racing career ==
A son of A.P. Indy and Warrior Queen, he was owned and raced by Stanley E. Fulton, owner of Sunland Park Racetrack. Initially trained by Eoin Harty, John Shirreffs conditioned the horse for his last seven starts. He won four times in twelve starts.

In 2007, A.P. Warrior was retired and sold to Stonewall Farm in Versailles, Kentucky where he stands for $15,000. In 2011 he moved to Stonewall Farms Ocala Location in Ocala, FL. He died there in early 2016 of a heart attack.

== Races ==
Finish	Race	Distance	Track	Condition
3rd	Oak Tree Derby	One and One-Eighth Miles (Turf)	Oak Tree at Santa Anita Park	Firm
1st	La Jolla Handicap	One and One-Sixteenth Miles (Turf)	Del Mar Racetrack	Firm
3rd	Swaps Breeders' Cup Stakes	One and One-Eighth Miles	Hollywood Park Racetrack	Fast
2nd	Affirmed Handicap	One and One-Sixteenth Miles	Hollywood Park Racetrack	Fast
18th	Kentucky Derby	One and One-Quarter Miles	Churchill Downs	Fast
3rd	Santa Anita Derby	One and One-Eighth Miles	Santa Anita Park	Fast
1st	San Felipe Stakes	One and One-Sixteenth Miles	Santa Anita Park	Fast
4th	El Camino Real Derby	One and One-Sixteenth Miles	Bay Meadows	Fast
4th	Hollywood Futurity	One and One-Sixteenth Miles	Hollywood Park Racetrack	Fast
1st	Allowance	One Mile	Oak Tree at Santa Anita Park	Fast
2nd	Norfolk Stakes	One and One-Sixteenth Miles	Oak Tree at Santa Anita Park	Fast
6th	Del Mar Futurity	Seven Furlongs	Del Mar Racetrack	Fast
1st	Maiden Special Weight	Seven Furlongs	Hollywood Park Racetrack	Fast
