= Gran Premio Joaquín S. de Anchorena =

G1 horse race in Argentina

Gran Premio Joaquín de Anchorena
- Class: Group 1
- Location: Hipódromo de San Isidro
- Inaugurated: 1980

Race information
- Distance: 1600 meters
- Surface: Turf
- Qualification: Three years old and older
- Weight: Weight for age
- Purse: $100,000,000 ARS (2025); 1st: $50,000,000 ARS

The Gran Premio Joaquín S. de Anchorena Internacional is a Group 1 horse race run at Hipódromo de San Isidro in Buenos Aires, Argentina, open to horses three years old or older. It is run over a distance of 1600 metres (0.99 mi) on the turf and is the most important mile race in Argentina.

== History ==
The Gran Premio Joaquín S. de Anchorena was inaugurated in 1980 as a Group 1 race, a designation it has retained since. The race is named after the presidente of the Jockey Club Argentino from 1922 to 1923 and from 1958 to 1959.

== Records since 1988 ==
Speed record:

- 1:30.90 – Satu (2022)

Greatest winning margin:

- 9 lengths – Inter Red (2010)

Most wins:

Since 1988, no horse has won the Gran Premio Joaquín S. de Anchorena more than once.

Most wins by a jockey:

- 4 – Juan Cruz Villagra (2011, 2014, 2016, 2024)
- 3 – Jorge Antonio Ricardo (1992, 2006, 2008)
- 3 – Pablo Gustavo Falero (2000, 2001, 2013)
- 3 – José Ricardo Méndez (2003, 2004, 2010)
- 3 – Gustavo E. Calvente (2005, 2015, 2018)

Most wins by a trainer:

- 3 – Ernesto Eusebio Romero (1994, 2011, 2014)
- 3 – Alfredo F. Gaitán Dassié (1995, 2003, 2016)
- 3 – Roberto Pellegatta (2005, 2006, 2015)
- 3 – Nicólas Martín Ferro (2012, 2022, 2023)

Most wins by an owner:

- 3 – Haras Pozo de Luna (1995, 1999, 2004)

Most wins by a breeder:

- 3 – Haras La Biznaga (2004, 2006, 2018)

== Winners since 1988 ==
Year	Winner	Age	Jockey	Trainer	Owner	Breeder	Time	Margin	Ref
2025	Earth God	4	Gustavo E. Calvente	Nicólas Martín Ferro	Stud Grupo 4	Haras Abolengo	1:32.19	Neck	
2024	El Que Sabe	4	Juan Cruz Villagra	Miguel Ángel Cafere	Stud J.C.V.	Haras El Paraíso	1:32.64	Neck	
2023	Huapango Torero	6	F. Fernandes Gonçalves	Nicólas Martín Ferro	Haras Pozo de Luna	Haras Cachagua and Haras Pozo de Luna	1:32.63	2 1/2 lengths	
2022	Satu	3	Eduardo Ortega Pavón	Nicólas Martín Ferro	Stud Libertadores de América	Haras Abolengo	1:30.90	1/2 length	
2021	Zillion Stars	4	Wilson R. Moreyra	Jorge A. Mayansky Neer	Stud Tinta Roja	Haras Phalaris	1:32.62	1/2 head	
2020	Irideo	4	Rodrigo G. Blanco	Nicolás Alfredo Gaitán	Haras Pozo de Luna	Haras Pozo de Luna	1:36.24	1/2 length	
2019	Top One Scape	4	Cristian E. Velázquez	Pablo Gabriel Guerrero	Stud Castañon	Haras Firmamento	1:32.79	1 length	
2018	Hat Mario	5	Gustavo E. Calvente	Hugo Miguel Pérez Sisto	Stud Los Cantores	Haras La Biznaga	1:35.73	Head	
2017	Nicholas	4	Eduardo Ortega Pavón	Enrique Martín Ferro	Stud Nosotros	Haras El Doguito	1:35.16	1/2 length	
2016	Le Ken	3	Juan Cruz Villagra	Alfredo F. Gaitán Dassié	Haras Pozo de Luna	Haras Cachagua and Haras Pozo de Luna	1:33.73	1 length	
2015	Eragon	4	Gustavo E. Calvente	Roberto Pellegatta	Stud Juan Antonio	Haras Avourneen	1:32.82	1/2 length	
2014	Todo Un Amiguito	6	Juan Cruz Villagra	Ernesto Eusebio Romero	Haras y Stud Don Nico	Carlos Alberto Virgini Monayer	1:33.29	2 lengths	
2013	Infiltrada ƒ	5	Pablo Gustavo Falero	José Luis Palacios	Stud Quilmes	Estacion de Montas La Mission and Miguel A. Repetto	1:32.55	1 length	
2012	Winning Prize	3	Jorge G. Ruíz Díaz	Nicólas Martín Ferro	Stud Los Nelson	Haras de la Pomme	1:31.45	2 lengths	
2011	Thunder One	3	Juan Cruz Villagra	Ernesto Eusebio Romero	Haras El Ángel de Venecia	Haras La Madrugada	1:32.11	1/2 length	
2010	Inter Red	6	José Ricardo Méndez	Néstor Eduardo Bustos	Haras Los Paraisos	Haras Los Paraisos	1:34.97	9 lengths	
2009	Maruco Plus	5	Cardenas E. Talaverano	Natalio D. Mezzotero	Stud Los Gauchoes	Haras La Gringa	1:32.06	1 1/2 lengths	
2008	Inter Optimist	4	Jorge Antonio Ricardo	Waldir Libero Zancanaro	Haras y Stud Vengador	Haras y Stud Vengador	1:31.62	1/2 length	
2007	Star Plus	4	Pedro Roberto Robles	Gregorio Bernardo Vivas	Stud Epona	Claudio Javier Valle and Marc Valle	1:32.49	3/4 length	
2006	Storm Military	4	Jorge Antonio Ricardo	Roberto Pellegatta	Haras La Biznaga	Haras La Biznaga	1:31.94	5 lengths	
2005	Strawberry Lake	5	Gustavo E. Calvente	Roberto Pellegatta	Stud El Wing	Haras Arroyo de Luna	1:32.44	1/2 length	
2004	Forty Fabuloso	4	José Ricardo Méndez	Jorge A. Mayansky Neer	Stud El Tute	Haras La Biznaga	1:32.11	1 1/2 lengths	
2003	From the Sky	3	José Ricardo Méndez	Alfredo F. Gaitán Dassié	Haras Rio Claro	Haras Rio Claro	1:32.06	7 lengths	
2002	Candy Ride	3	Armando C. Glades	Roberto Daniel López	Haras Ojos Claros	Haras Abolengo	1:31.01	8 lengths	
2001	Randy Cat ƒ	3	Pablo Gustavo Falero	Juan Carlos Maldotti	Haras Vacacion	Haras Vacacion	1:31.83	3/4 length	
2000	Paga ƒ	3	Pablo Gustavo Falero	Juan Carlos Maldotti	Stud Camelias Mercedinas	Haras Las Camelias	1:31.83	3 lengths	
1999	Cafetin	3	Daniel Jorge Ojeda	Enrique Clerc	Haras Rodeo Chico	Haras Rodeo Chico	1:31.62	Neck	
1998	Ixal	3	Carlos F. Fernández	Nahuel Orlandi	Stud Chichin	Haras El Paraíso	1:31.54	3 lengths	
1997	Geneve	5	Jacinto R. Herrera	Juan Carlos Etchechoury	Haras La Quebrada	Haras La Quebrada	1:36.72	1/2 length	
1996	Atonic	4	Rubén Emilion Laitán	Ever W. Perdomo		Haras Don Santiago	1:33.78	1/2 neck	
1995	Riton	5	Horacio E. Karamanos	Alfredo F. Gaitán Dassié	Haras Rio Claro	Linneo Edouardo de Paula Machado	1:31.68	2 lengths	
1994	El Coliseo	4	Pedro A. Santos L.	Ernesto Eusebio Romero	Stud El Galo	Haras Comalal	1:32.4	3/4 length	
1993	Cleante	4	Jacinto R. Herrera	Vilmar Sanguinetti	Frank E. Whitham	Haras Malacate	1:32.6	Neck	
1992	Mount Royal	3	Jorge Antonio Ricardo	Ricardo Amado	Haras Los Apamates	Haras Los Apamates	1:33.2	3/4 length	
1991	Vigorous Toss	5	Rubén Emilion Laitán		Stud Rencontre		1:33.2	1/2 length	
1990	Aldabon	3	Miguel Ángel Sarati	Juan Carlos Bianchi	Stud Faruk	José Antonio de All	1:33.6		
1989	Odalea ƒ	3	Juan Alberto Maciel	Isidoro L. San Millán	Stud Castelli	Haras Vacacion	1:32.6	1 1/2 lengths	
1988	Companion	3	Edgardo Gramática	Juan Alberto Maldotti	Stud La Titina	Héctor Sánchez	1:32.2		

ƒ indicates a filly/mare

== Earlier winners ==
- 1980: Con Otelo
- 1981: Hackman
- 1982: Guston
- 1983: Lord at War
- 1984: Fayrsal
- 1986 (Jan): Good Champagne
- 1986 (Dec): Ieron
- 1987: Sol Naciente
