= Tinners Way =

American-bred Thoroughbred racehorse

- Sire: Secretariat
- Grandsire: Bold Ruler
- Dam: Devon Diva
- Damsire: The Minstrel
- Sex: Stallion
- Foaled: May 25, 1990
- Died: July 5, 2017 (aged 27); Old Friends Equine
- Country: United States
- Colour: Chestnut
- Breeder: Juddmonte Farms
- Owner: Juddmonte Farms
- Trainer: Bobby Frankel
- Jockey: Ed Delahoussaye
- Record: 27: 7-6-4
- Earnings: $1,846,546

Major wins
- City of York Stakes (1993); Fortune Stakes (1993); Pacific Classic (1994 ,1995); Californian Stakes (1996)
- Last updated on May 11, 2013

Tinners Way (May 25, 1990 – July 5, 2017) was an American Thoroughbred best known as the last colt from his sire Secretariat's final crop. He began running on European turf in 1992 and concluded three and a half seasons later with strong performances against top-rated fields on American dirt courses, including back-to-back wins in the Pacific Classic. His earnings exceeded $1.8 million, which established him, along with Risen Star, Lady's Secret, and General Assembly, as one of his sire's top performers. After standing at stud for many years in Kentucky, California and Texas, he was retired to Old Friends Equine near Lexington, Kentucky in 2010, where he died in 2017.

== Background ==
Tinners Way was a golden chestnut horse with a white star and stripe on his forehead, reminiscent of his sire Secretariat. His dam was Devon Diva, whose sire The Minstrel won both the Epsom and Irish Derby. Although Devon Diva only won once, her dam Devon Ditty was the Champion 2-year-old filly in England.

== Career highlights ==
Bred by and running for Juddmonte Farms, Tinners Way began his career on the British turf, trained by John Gosden and ridden by Pat Eddery. His first start was on November 7, 1992, with a 7-furlong maiden win at Doncaster Racecourse. He returned five months later at age three in the Greenham Stakes at Newbury, where he finished third. On May 9, he faced Group 1 company in the Poule d'Essai des Poulains at Longchamp, finishing ninth. He next tried the Sussex Stakes at Goodwood and finished eighth. Dropping down to the City of York Stakes, he earned his first win of the season, and followed it up with a win in the Fortune Stakes at Kempton Park. He then finished third in the prestigious Prix de la Forêt at Longchamp before being shipped to Santa Anita Park in California for the Volante Handicap, where he finished fourth.

For 1994, he remained in the United States and was placed under the conditioning of Hall of Fame trainer Bobby Frankel. He raced on the dirt for the first time in an allowance race at Santa Anita Park, finishing second. This was followed by losses in five stakes races, though he did manage to place in the Mervyn Leroy Handicap and Arcadia Handicap, the latter being his only turf competition for the year. He finally returned to the winner's circle in the Golden Gate Fields Breeders' Cup Handicap, then finished second in the Bel Air Handicap at Hollywood Park.

He came into the Pacific Classic at Del Mar on August 13 with only 1 win in 8 starts for the year, and faced a top quality field headed by Bertrando and Best Pal. He was ridden for the first time by Hall of Fame jockey Eddie Delahoussaye, who said after the race: "Bobby told me that this horse has one good spurt. Not a long one, but a good one. At the three-eighths pole, I had to go with my horse, because Best Pal came to me. It was a premature move, but I didn't have much choice. I had to go or I was going to get trapped." Tinners Way would win by 1 length over Best Pal in a time of 1:59 2/5 for the 1 1/4 miles, tying the track record.

Tinners Way finished his four-year-old campaign by shipping across the country to Belmont Park for the Woodward Stakes on September 17. He finished sixth behind eventual Horse of the Year Holy Bull.

Tinners Way would not return to the track until June 11, 1995, in the Californian Stakes, where he finished third behind Concern, who had won the 1994 Breeders' Cup Classic. On July 2 in the Hollywood Gold Cup, he beat Concern but finished second to eventual Horse of the Year Cigar. Tinners Way then returned to Del Mar for the Pacific Classic on August 13, which he won easily over Soul of the Matter in a time of 1:59.63. He was the first horse to repeat in the Pacific Classic.

He then shipped to Illinois for the Arlington Million on August 27. In his first start on the turf in over a year, Tinners Way finished fifth behind Awad, beaten by only 4 1/4 lengths. Returning to California for the Goodwood Handicap, he finished second to Soul of the Matter. He then shipped again, this time to Belmont Park for the Breeders' Cup Classic on October 28. After a slow start and racing wide, Tinners Way would finish seventh behind Cigar.

Tinners Way did not begin his six-year-old campaign until June 2, 1996, in the Californian Stakes. Going off as the third choice in a field of four, he won by 1/2 lengths in 1:46 3/5 for the 1 1/8 miles, equaling the track record. He then failed to respond to his jockey's urging down the stretch in his second attempt at the Hollywood Gold Cup, finishing sixth. He then returned to Del Mar to attempt to win his third running of the Pacific Classic. Unfortunately, Tinners Way injured his left front ankle and was vanned off. He never competed again.

== Retirement ==
In 1996, Tinners Way assumed stallion duties at Vinery, Kentucky. In 2000 he was sold to the Harris Farm operation in California where he stood for the next three years. He was then acquired by Phil Leckinger to stand at Key Ranch in Texas. Leckinger said: "Harris Farms told us we'd get a lot of phone calls and requests to see him. It's gone beyond fascinating. It's gratifying to know that so many people care about an individual horse. And, if you look, his daughters especially are doing well. We still think there are enough people who understand he has something to offer the gene pool." From 14 crops, Tinners Way sired 93 winners with a combined earnings of $3,263,785.

On September 13, 2010, Tinners Way was retired to Old Friends Equine at Dream Chase Farm in Georgetown, Kentucky. On July 5, 2017, he was euthanized due to the acute onset of severe neurologic disease.

== Pedigree ==
Pedigree of Tinners Way, chestnut horse, 1990
Sire Secretariat 1970	Bold Ruler; 1954	Nasrullah	Nearco (ITY)
Sire Secretariat 1970	Bold Ruler; 1954	Nasrullah	Mumtaz Begum
Sire Secretariat 1970	Bold Ruler; 1954	Miss Disco	Discovery
Sire Secretariat 1970	Bold Ruler; 1954	Miss Disco	Outdone
Sire Secretariat 1970	Somethingroyal; 1952	Princequillo	Prince Rose (GB)
Sire Secretariat 1970	Somethingroyal; 1952	Princequillo	Cosquilla
Sire Secretariat 1970	Somethingroyal; 1952	Imperatrice	Caruso
Sire Secretariat 1970	Somethingroyal; 1952	Imperatrice	Cinquepace
Dam Devon Diva 1982	The Minstrel; 1974	Northern Dancer	Nearctic
Dam Devon Diva 1982	The Minstrel; 1974	Northern Dancer	Natalma
Dam Devon Diva 1982	The Minstrel; 1974	Fleur	Victoria Park
Dam Devon Diva 1982	The Minstrel; 1974	Fleur	Flaming Page
Dam Devon Diva 1982	Devon Ditty (GB); 1976	Song (GB)	Sing Sing (GB)
Dam Devon Diva 1982	Devon Ditty (GB); 1976	Song (GB)	Intent
Dam Devon Diva 1982	Devon Ditty (GB); 1976	Devon Night	Midsummer Night
Dam Devon Diva 1982	Devon Ditty (GB); 1976	Devon Night	Devon Violet family: 1-t

== References and external links ==
1994 Pacific Classic on YouTube
