= Gordon Glisson =

American jockey

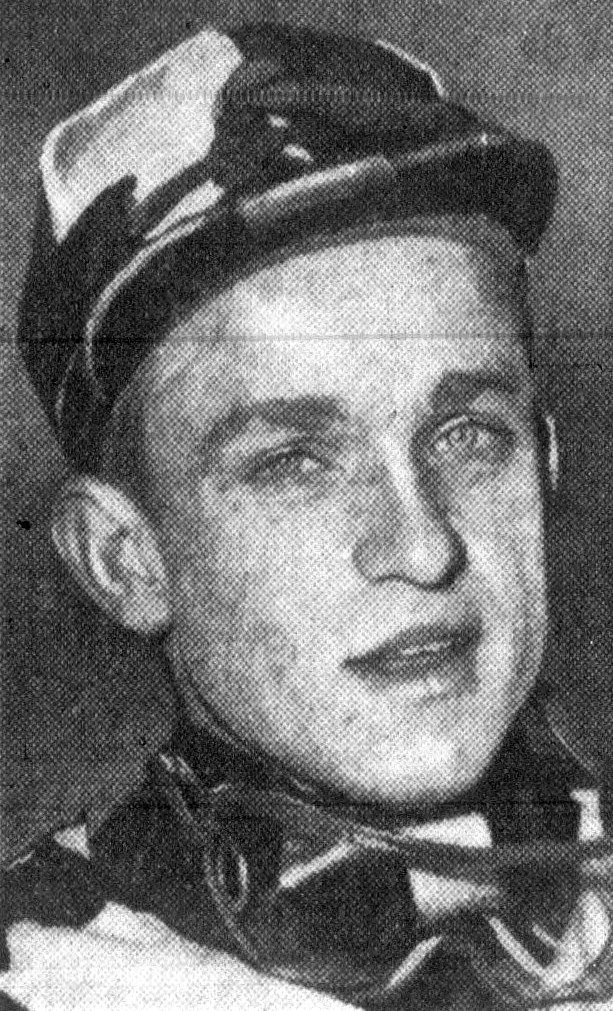
- Glisson, circa 1949

Personal information
- Born: October 31, 1930 Winnsboro, South Carolina, U.S.
- Died: February 23, 1997 (aged 66)
- Occupation: Jockey

Horse racing career
- Sport: Horse racing
- Career wins: Not found

Major racing wins
- American Legion Handicap (1949); Kentucky Oaks (1949); Santa Anita Derby (1949); Saratoga Special Stakes (1949); Wilson Stakes (1949); Del Mar Debutante Stakes (1951); La Jolla Handicap (1951, 1955); San Luis Rey Handicap (1952); Santa Maria Handicap (1954); Hollywood Gold Cup (1955); Los Angeles Handicap (1955); Palomar Handicap (1955); San Felipe Stakes (1957)

Racing awards
- Seattle Post-Intelligencer Sports Star of the Year (1949); United States Champion Jockey by wins (1949); George Woolf Memorial Jockey Award (1950)

Significant horses
- Old Rockport, Rejected
- Updated on October 23, 2008

Gordon P. Glisson (October 31, 1930 – February 23, 1997) was an American Champion Thoroughbred horse racing jockey.

Born in Winnsboro, South Carolina, at age fifteen he and his mother moved to Seattle, Washington. He began working at the Longacres Racetrack in nearby Renton, Washington then as an apprentice jockey rode in his first race at the Ak-Sar-Ben Racetrack in Omaha, Nebraska. In 1948, younger brother John Weldon Glisson would also become a jockey.

Within a few years, Gordon Glisson developed into a top jockey and in the 1948-1949 winter racing season he led all jockeys at Santa Anita Park in wins. In 1949 he also rode in New York State where he had four winners in one day and ended the year as the leading jockey in New York and in total won more races than any jockey in the United States. During his outstanding 1949 campaign he won the prestigious Santa Anita Derby with Old Rockport then rode him to a fourth-place finish in the Kentucky Derby and to eighth place in the Preakness Stakes. Among Glisson's other important wins, on January 26, 1950, he rode Miche to a huge upset win over the great Citation in the La Sorpresa Handicap at Santa Anita Park. In 1955, Glisson won another major West Coast event, capturing the Hollywood Gold Cup aboard King Ranch's, Rejected.

A fan favorite, The New Yorker magazine of March 5, 1949 (p. 79) wrote that "What impresses horsemen most is that his style is remarkably like that of the late George Woolf, even to the coolness he shows in tight finishes." In a similar vein, the October 31, 1949, issue of Time magazine did an article on Gordon Glisson titled "The Kid with the Cold Eye".

In 1950, Glisson was the first recipient of the newly created George Woolf Memorial Jockey Award given to a successful Thoroughbred racing jockey in North America who demonstrates high standards of personal and professional conduct, on and off the racetrack. In 2003, he was nominated for the Washington Thoroughbred Racing Hall of Fame.

Gordon Glisson was living in Ojai, California, when he died in 1997 at the Sherman Oaks Burn Center following an accident at his home.
