= Stonewall Farm =

Thoroughbred racehorse breeding farm in Kentucky, United States

Coordinates: 38.1098°N 84.7077°W

Stonewall Farm (also known as Stonewall Dominion) is a thoroughbred race horse breeding farm in Versailles, Kentucky established in 1852. It is named for its famous "stone wall" built during the Civil War by Irishman John Kearney in 1863. Originally owned by Major Warren Viley, it was known as Woodford (County) Stud.

Lexington, Leading sire in North America 16 times, stood at stud there in the 1860s and 1870s.

== Present day ==
The farm is currently owned and run by Jose Luis Espinoza and was previously known as Gaillardia Farm.

The farm has been home to a number of famous horses including 2007 American Champion Older Male Horse Lawyer Ron, 2005 American Champion Male Turf Horse Leroidesanimaux, and stakes winners A. P. Warrior, Marquetry, Doneraile Court, Da Stoops, and Medaglia d'Oro, who sired 2009 Preakness Stakes winner Rachel Alexandra.
