= Pacific Classic Stakes =

- Class: Grade I
- Location: Del Mar Racetrack; Del Mar, California
- Inaugurated: 1991
- Race type: Thoroughbred - Flat racing
- Sponsor: FanDuel Racing (since 2023)
- Website: Del Mar

Race information
- Distance: 1 1/4 miles
- Surface: Dirt
- Track: Left-handed
- Qualification: Three-year-olds & older
- Weight: Three-year-olds: 118 lbs. Older horses: 124 lbs.
- Purse: $1,000,000 (2021)
- Bonuses: Winner automatic entry into Breeders' Cup Classic

The Pacific Classic Stakes is an American Thoroughbred horse race held annually in August or September at the Del Mar Racetrack in Del Mar, California. This Grade I one and one-quarter miles race on dirt is open to horses aged three years and older. The event currently carries a purse of $1,000,000.

== History ==
The event was inaugurated on 10 August 1991 with a purse of US$1 million and immediately became the premier event of the racing season at Del Mar. The first running was won by the 1990 California Horse of the Year three year old Best Pal in a time of 1:59 4/5. Best Pal would run two more times, finishing third to Bertrando in 1993 and second to Tinners Way in 1994.

The event was classified as Grade I for the third running in 1993 and has held that class since.

Del Mar switched its main racing surface from dirt to synthetic Polytrack in 2007 and the Pacific Classic winner that year was long-shot Student Council, who was handled by veteran Richard Migliore.

Starting in 2008, the TVG Pacific Classic became a part of the Breeders' Cup Challenge, where the winner of the race would automatically earn a spot in the Breeders' Cup Classic. has become one of the top prizes for older horses racing in the United States each year.

In 2015 Beholder became the first filly or mare to win the event. She won by 8 1/4 lengths with a final time of 1:59.77, against an otherwise all-male field of nine other horses, including 2014 Breeders' Cup Classic winner Bayern. She won in the third-fastest winning time in the history of the race, and with the second-largest margin of victory at that time, behind the 2013 win of Game On Dude. In 2018 Accelerate would win by an even greater margin of 12 1/2 lengths.

In 2016 California Chrome became the first Kentucky Derby winner to win the event.

== Records ==
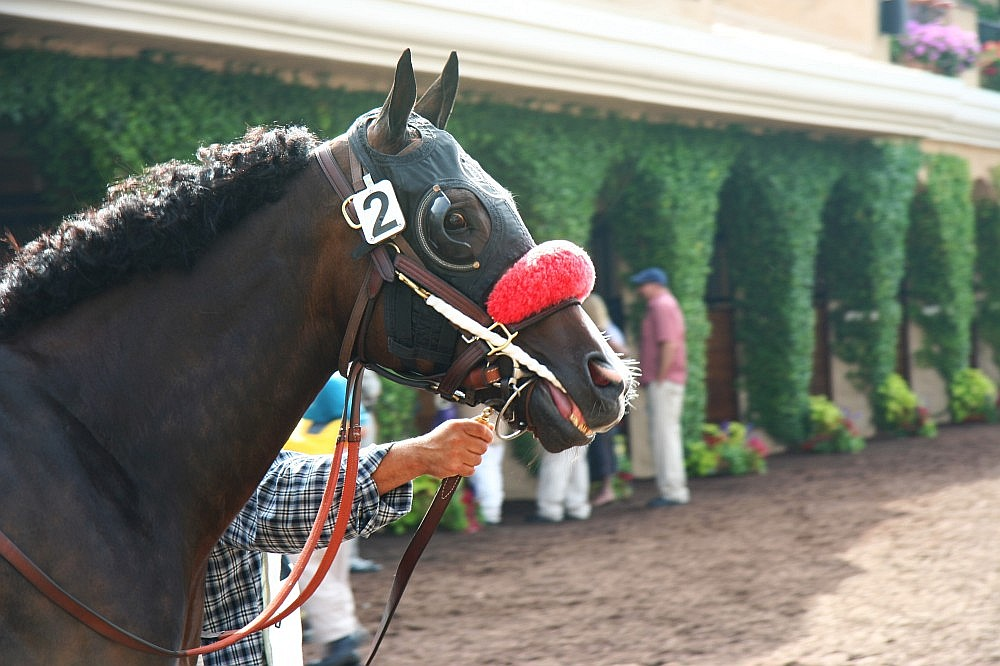
2006 winner Lava Man - first horse ever to take the Grade I Santa Anita Handicap, the Grade I Hollywood Gold Cup, and the Grade I Pacific Classic Stakes in the same calendar year

Time record:

- 1:59.11 - Candy Ride (2003)

Largest Margin

- 19 1/4 lengths - Flightline (2022)

Most wins:

- 2 - Tinners Way (1994, 1995)
- 2 - Skimming (2000, 2001)
- 2 - Richard's Kid (2009, 2010)

Most wins by an owner:

- 4 - Juddmonte Farms (1994, 1995, 2000, 2001)
- 4 - Hronis Racing (2018, 2019, 2021, 2022)

Most wins by a jockey:

- 4 - Garrett K. Gomez (2000, 2001, 2005, 2008)
- 4 - Mike E. Smith (2002, 2009, 2010, 2014)

Most wins by a trainer:

- 7 - Bob Baffert (1999, 2009, 2010, 2013, 2017, 2020, 2023)

== Winners ==
Year	Winner	Age	Jockey	Trainer	Owner	Distance	Time	Purse	Grade	Ref
2026	Knightsbridge	5	Junior Alvarado	Bill Mott	Godolphin LLC	1 1/4 miles	2:02.28	$1,001,000	I	
2025	Fierceness	4	John R. Velazquez	Todd A. Pletcher	Repole Stable, Derrick Smith, Mrs. John Magnier & Michael Tabor	1 1/4 miles	2:01.00	$1,001,000	I	
2024	Mixto	4	Kyle Frey	Doug F. O'Neill	Calumet Farm	1 1/4 miles	2:02.10	$1,001,500	I	
2023	Arabian Knight	3	Flavien Prat	Bob Baffert	Zedan Racing	1 1/4 miles	2:03.19	$1,002,500	I	
2022	Flightline	4	Flavien Prat	John W. Sadler	Hronis Racing, Summer Wind Equine, West Point Thoroughbreds, & Siena Farm	1 1/4 miles	1:59.28	$1,000,500	I	
2021	Tripoli	4	Tiago Pereira	John W. Sadler	Hronis Racing	1 1/4 miles	2:02.37	$1,002,000	I	
2020	Maximum Security	4	Abel Cedillo	Bob Baffert	Gary L & Mary E West, Mrs J Magnier, M Tabor & D Smith	1 1/4 miles	2:01.24	$500,500	I	
2019	Higher Power	4	Flavien Prat	John W. Sadler	Hronis Racing	1 1/4 miles	2:02.43	$1,001,755	I	
2018	Accelerate	5	Joel Rosario	John W. Sadler	Hronis Racing	1 1/4 miles	2:01.83	$1,000,690	I	
2017	Collected	4	Martin Garcia	Bob Baffert	Speedway Stable	1 1/4 miles	2:00.70	$1,000,690	I	
2016	California Chrome	5	Victor Espinoza	Art Sherman	California Chrome	1 1/4 miles	2:00.13	$1,001,380	I	
2015	ƒ Beholder	5	Gary L. Stevens	Richard E. Mandella	Spendthrift Farm	1 1/4 miles	1:59.77	$1,001,250	I	
2014	Shared Belief	3	Mike E. Smith	Jerry Hollendorfer	Jungle Racing, KMN Racing, Hollendorfer, Litt, Solis II & Todaro	1 1/4 miles	2:00.28	$1,001,250	I	
2013	Game On Dude	6	Martin Garcia	Bob Baffert	Lanni Family Trust, Mercedes Stable, Diamond Pride & B. Schiappa	1 1/4 miles	†2:00.69	$1,001,750	I	
2012	Dullahan	3	Joel Rosario	Dale L. Romans	Donegal Racing	1 1/4 miles	1:59.54	$1,000,000	I	
2011	Acclamation	5	Pat Valenzuela	Donald Warren	Peter & Mary Hilvers and E. W. & Judy Johnston	1 1/4 miles	2:00.61	$1,000,000	I	
2010	Richard's Kid	5	Mike E. Smith	Bob Baffert	Zabeel Racing International	1 1/4 miles	2:03.27	$1,000,000	I	
2009	Richard's Kid	4	Mike E. Smith	Bob Baffert	Arnold Zetcher	1 1/4 miles	2:02.39	$1,000,000	I	
2008	Go Between	5	Garrett K. Gomez	William I. Mott	Peter Vegso	1 1/4 miles	2:01:18	$1,000,000	I	
2007	Student Council	5	Richard Migliore	Vladimir Cerin	Millennium Farms	1 1/4 miles	2:07.29	$1,120,000	I	
2006	Lava Man	5	Corey Nakatani	Doug F. O'Neill	STD Stable & Jason Wood	1 1/4 miles	2:01.62	$1,000,000	I	
2005	Borrego	4	Garrett K. Gomez	C. Beau Greely	J. Kelly, B. Scott, Ralls & Foster	1 1/4 miles	2:00.71	$1,000,000	I	
2004	Pleasantly Perfect	6	Jerry D. Bailey	Richard E. Mandella	Diamond A Racing Corp	1 1/4 miles	2:01.17	$1,000,000	I	
2003	Candy Ride (ARG)	4	Julie Krone	Ron McAnally	Sidney & Jenny Craig	1 1/4 miles	1:59.11	$980,000	I	
2002	§ Came Home	3	Mike E. Smith	J. Paco Gonzalez	William S. Farish III, John B. Goodman, Trudy McCaffery & John A. Toffan	1 1/4 miles	2:01.45	$1,000,000	I	
2001	Skimming	5	Garrett K. Gomez	Robert J. Frankel	Juddmonte Farms	1 1/4 miles	1:59.96	$1,000,000	I	
2000	Skimming	4	Garrett K. Gomez	Robert J. Frankel	Juddmonte Farms	1 1/4 miles	2:01.22	$1,000,000	I	
1999	General Challenge	3	David R. Flores	Bob Baffert	Golden Eagle Farm	1 1/4 miles	2:00.40	$1,180,000	I	
1998	Free House	4	Chris McCarron	J. Paco Gonzalez	John A. Toffan & Trudy McCaffery	1 1/4 miles	2:00.20	$1,000,000	I	
1997	Gentlemen (ARG)	5	Gary L. Stevens	Richard E. Mandella	Randall Dee Hubbard	1 1/4 miles	2:00.40	$1,375,000	I	
1996	Dare and Go	4	Alex O. Solis	Richard E. Mandella	La Presle Farm	1 1/4 miles	1:59.80	$1,500,000	I	
1995	Tinners Way	5	Eddie Delahoussaye	Robert J. Frankel	Juddmonte Farms	1 1/4 miles	1:59.60	$1,000,000	I	
1994	Tinners Way	4	Eddie Delahoussaye	Robert J. Frankel	Juddmonte Farms	1 1/4 miles	1:59.40	$1,000,000	I	
1993	§ Bertrando	4	Gary L. Stevens	Robert J. Frankel	505 Farms & Ed Nahem	1 1/4 miles	1:59.55	$1,000,000	I	
1992	Missionary Ridge (GB)	5	Kent J. Desormeaux	Robert J. Frankel	Peter Wall	1 1/4 miles	2:00.80	$1,225,000		
1991	Best Pal	3	Pat Valenzuela	Gary F. Jones	Golden Eagle Farm	1 1/4 miles	1:59.80	$1,000,000		

Legend:
All Weather Track Dirt
Notes:
§ Ran as part of an entry
ƒ Filly or mare
† Game On Dude's 2013 actual winning time according to "Trakus time" is 1:59.26.

== See also ==
- List of American and Canadian Graded races
