= Borrego (horse) =

American-bred Thoroughbred racehorse

- Sire: El Prado
- Grandsire: Sadler's Wells
- Dam: Sweet as Honey
- Damsire: Strike the Gold
- Sex: Stallion
- Foaled: 2001
- Country: United States
- Colour: Chestnut
- Breeder: Jon S. Kelly, Ralls & Foster LLC, Brad Scott, et al.
- Owner: Jon S. Kelly, Ralls & Foster LLC, Brad Scott, et al.
- Trainer: C. Beau Greely
- Record: 20: 5-6-2
- Earnings: $2,052,090

Major wins
- Pacific Classic Stakes (2005); Jockey Club Gold Cup (2005)
- Last updated on September 21, 2007

Borrego (foaled May 17, 2001 in Kentucky, United States) is an American Thoroughbred racehorse and sire. Borrego was bred to sell by a partnership Jon Kelly, Ralls and Foster LLC, Brad Scott and C. Beau Greeley. The partnership twice bought Borrego back at auction when bidding did not reach the reserve price set by the partnership. He was campaigned by Lexington-native C. Beau Greely throughout his 20 race career, which included victories in a pair of Grade 1 races and a start in the prestigious Kentucky Derby at Churchill Downs.

== Racing career ==
=== 2004: Two-year-old season ===
Borrego's career as a racehorse began in October 2003. Being by the Irish sire El Prado, a sire known for producing both turf and dirt runners, trainer C. Beau Greely debuted his homebred colt on the turf in a one-mile Maiden Special Weight at Santa Anita Park. After running 4th in his debut, he won for the first time in his next start, and went on to win once more in his juvenile season.

=== 2005: Three-year-old season ===
Greely started Borrego on the road to the Kentucky Derby in 2004, first in the Sham Stakes at Santa Anita Park.

He earned his spot in the Derby after respectable finishes in the Louisiana Derby and Arkansas Derby, but could do no better than 10th on Derby Day. He wheeled back two weeks later in the second leg of the Triple Crown, Pimlico's Preakness Stakes. He ran 7th in that race, but rebounded that fall to finish 2nd in a pair of stakes races.

=== 2006: Four-year-old season ===
Borrego came back for his four-year-old season, and after several solid efforts he finally broke through in the Pacific Classic at Del Mar, rallying from well back to pull off a 1/2-length upset at 11/1 odds.

Greely shipped Borrego across the country for the Grade 1 Jockey Club Gold Cup at Belmont Park. Under regular rider Garrett Gomez, dropped back to his usual position near the rear of the pack early before unleashing a rally en route to an effortless 4½ length win. With that victory he became the first horse to win both the Pacific Classic and Jockey Club Gold Cup, each valued at $1,000,000.

Borrego's final career race was the Breeders' Cup Classic, also held at Belmont that year, but he was unable to replicate his previous efforts as he ran 10th. Borrego was set to return to race as a five-year-old in 2006, but ankle surgery in March of that year pushed back his expected return date until late that summer. By April, Borrego had been officially retired from racing as he was not healing as quickly as expected.

== Race record ==
Finish	Race	Distance	Track	Beyer
2005
10th	Breeders' Cup Classic	One and One-Fourth Miles	Belmont Park	97
1st	Jockey Club Gold Cup	One and One-Fourth Miles	Belmont Park	110
1st	Pacific Classic	One and One-Fourth Miles	Del Mar	113
2nd	Hollywood Gold Cup	One and One-Fourth Miles	Hollywood Park	107
4th	Californian Stakes	One and One-Eighth Miles	Hollywood Park	104
3rd	Mervyn Leroy Handicap	One and One-Sixteenth Miles	Hollywood Park	107
3rd	Santa Anita Handicap	One and One-Fourth Miles	Santa Anita Park	103
1st	Allowance Optional Claiming	One and One-Sixteenth Miles	Santa Anita Park	94
2004
9th	Oak Tree Derby	One and One-Eighth Miles (Turf)	Santa Anita Park	98
2nd	Super Derby	One and One-Eighth Miles	Louisiana Downs	102
2nd	El Cajon Stakes	One Mile	Del Mar	91
7th	Preakness Stakes	One and Three-Sixteenth Miles	Pimlico	94
10th	Kentucky Derby	One and One-Fourth Miles	Churchill Downs	83
2nd	Arkansas Derby	One and One-Eighth Miles	Oaklawn Park	107
2nd	Louisiana Derby	One and One-Sixteenth Miles	Fair Grounds	97
2nd	Sham Stakes	One and One-Eighth Miles	Santa Anita Park	98
2003
1st	Allowance Optional Claiming	One and One-Sixteenth Miles	Santa Anita Park	93
8th	Generous Stakes	One Mile (Turf)	Hollywood Park	77
1st	Maiden Special Weight	One Mile (Turf)	Santa Anita Park	84
4th	Maiden Special Weight	One Mile (Turf)	Santa Anita Park	61

== As a stallion ==
Upon retirement, Borrego was shipped to Kentucky to stand at the Wintergreen Stallion Station in Midway. He stands for a fee of $20,000 for a single live cover breeding. His first crop began racing in 2010.
