= Backstretch =

Backstretch refers to either: (1) the portion of an oval racetrack on the far side of the grandstand, parallel to the homestretch, or, (2) particularly in North America, the area near the racetrack where horses are stabled and the daily work of maintaining the horses occurs. In many racetracks, the stabling area is located next to the far side of the track, and may also be called "the other side of the track" or the "backside".

== Portion of the racetrack ==
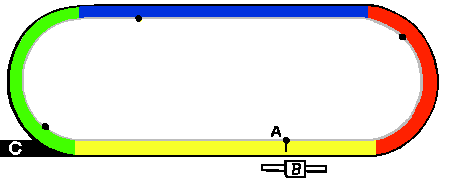
Generic left-handed racetrack diagram: A = finish line, B = grandstand, C/black = chute, Yellow = homestretch, Red = clubhouse turn, Blue = backstretch, Green = far turn, gray inside line = rail and the white center is the infield.

The standard definition of backstretch refers to the configuration of an oval racetrack, where the backstretch is parallel to the homestretch. It is shown in blue on the adjacent diagram. On an oval track, sprint races (typically 7 furlongs or less) begin on the backstretch and go around one turn to the finish line. Longer races start in the homestretch, take one turn into the backstretch, then another turn into the homestretch, so may be called "two turn" races. Depending on the track dimensions, very long races may consist of three turns, starting on the backstretch and then making a full lap and more.

== Stabling area ==
Backstretch is also used to refer to the stabling area adjacent to the racetrack. A backstretch is divided into several areas. One, known as "shed row", is a line of stables, each stable home to many of the horses at the track. There are also dormitories, where workers (many migrant) live; offices for the trainers to register horses for upcoming races; a cafeteria; a recreation hall; and offices for the Chaplain. People working in this area are sometimes described as "the backstretch family", consisting of trainers, exercise riders, jockeys, grooms, farriers, veterinarians, muckers, jockey agents, and others in various positions.

One groom explained the daily routine: "I come in about four-thirty. Feed breakfast. Most people have watchers [who observe a horse to make sure it is eating well and shows no signs of illness] when they feed breakfast. We don't because the stable's not that big. But I come in about four-thirty. Feed. Muck out my stalls. Then about five-thirty—six we start training. You know, we pack them up and send them to the track. They come back, we bathe them. But that lasts until ten or ten-thirty. Then we do them up. We put all kinds of liniments and poultices on them and put bandages on them. We feed about eleven a.m. Then we come back about three-thirty. Muck out the stalls again and feed them about five. And then we're done..."

On racedays, the groom is also responsible for leading the horse to and from the racetrack, followed by a bath.
