= Fairmount Park Racetrack =

Horse racing track in Illinois, United States

Fanduel Sportsbook and Horse Racing Fairmount Park
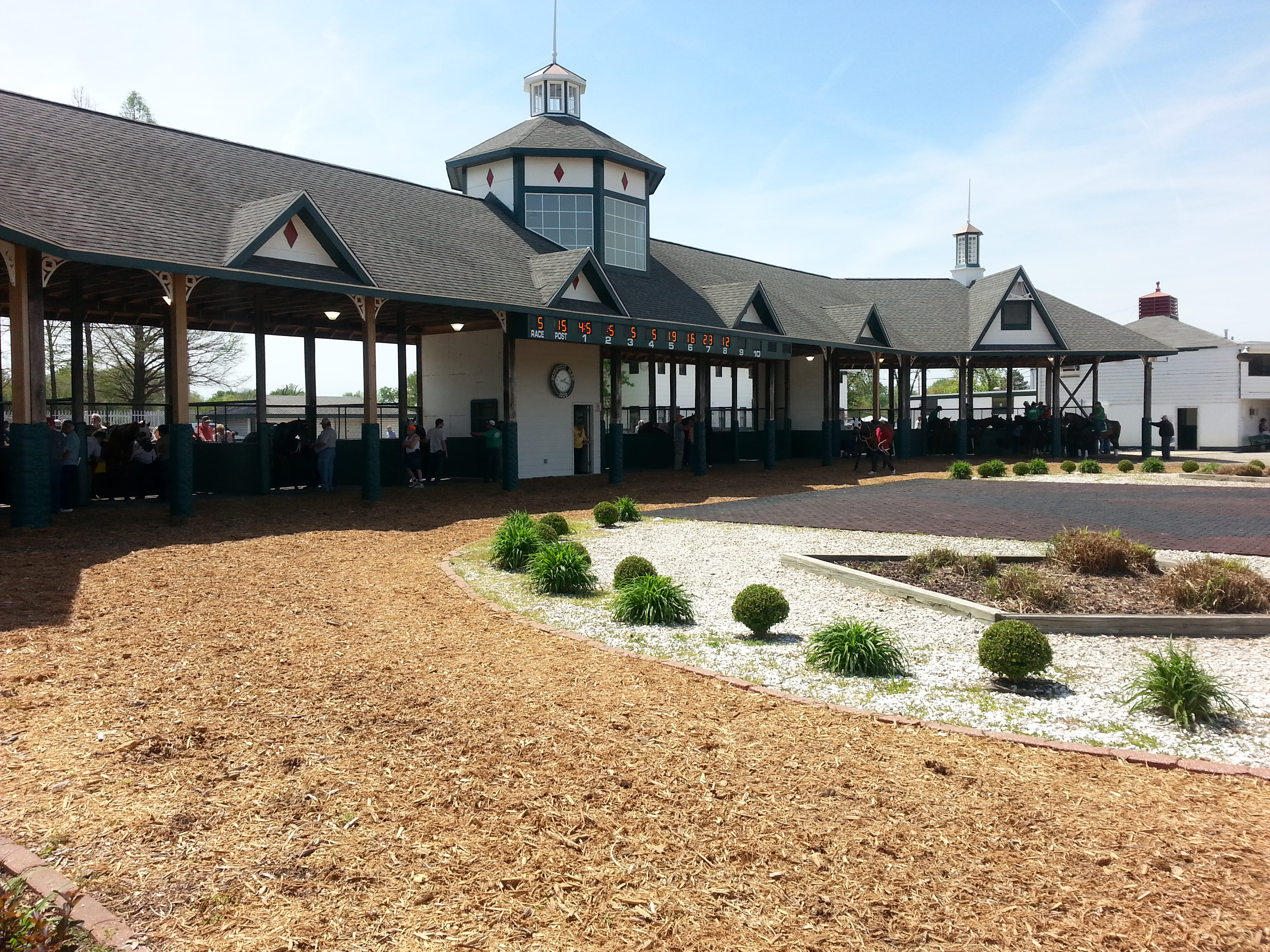
- View of the paddock at Fairmount Park Horse Race Track in Collinsville, Illinois
- Interactive map of Fanduel Sportsbook and Horse Racing; Fairmount Park
- Location: Collinsville, Illinois, United States
- Coordinates: 38°39′47″N 90°2′8″W
- Date opened: 1925
- Race type: Thoroughbred (current), harness (through 1999)
- Notable races: St. Louis Derby

Fairmount Park Casino and Racing is a horse racing venue in Collinsville, Illinois, United States, a part of the St. Louis metropolitan area. The track hosts Thoroughbred flat racing. It is one of two horse racing venues currently active in Illinois, and the only one outside the Chicago, Illinois metro area. The track also featured Standardbred harness racing, but discontinued it in 1999.

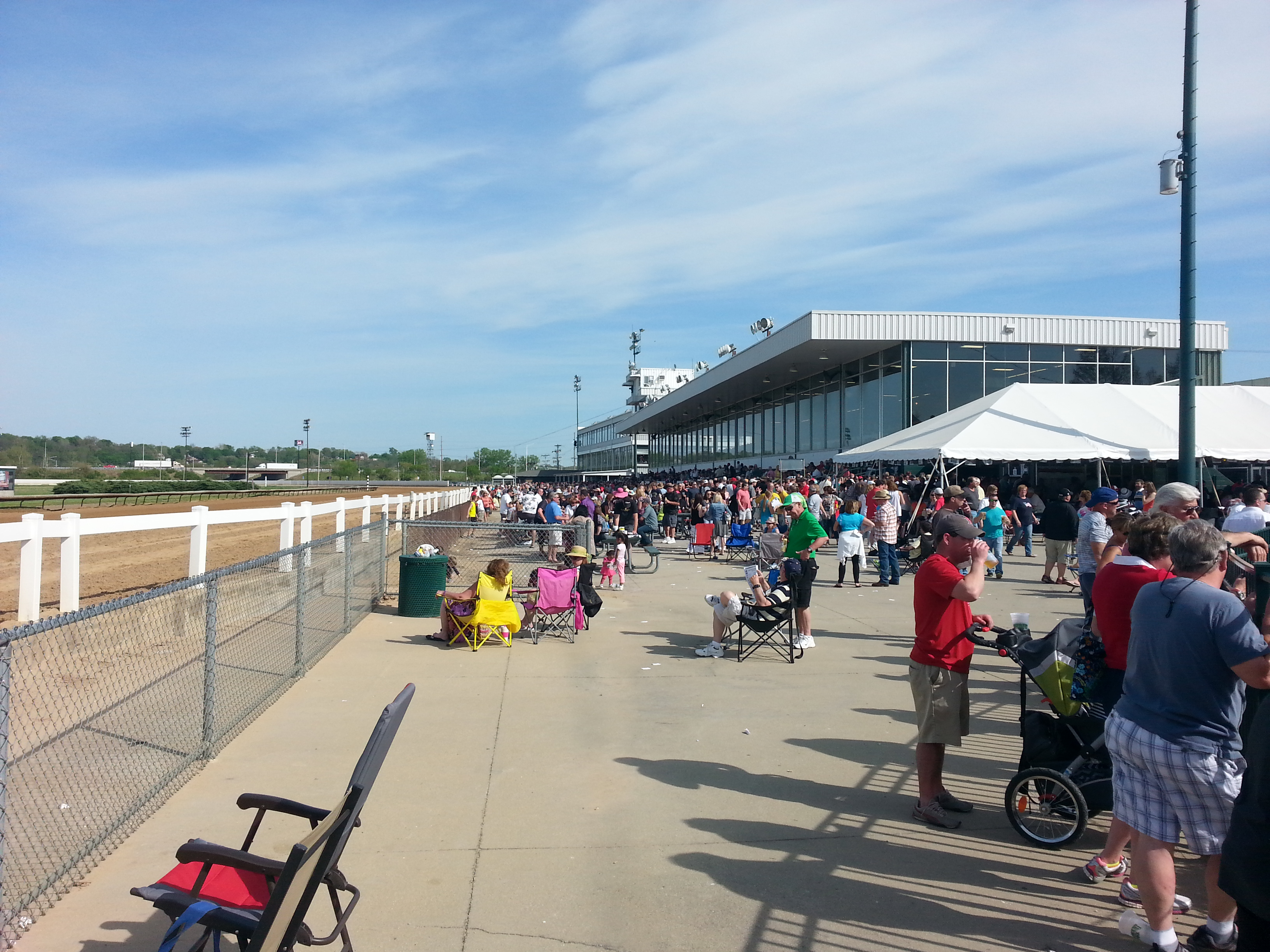
View of the spectator stands at Fairmount Park Horse Race Track in Collinsville, Illinois

The track opened in 1925. The racing surface is a one-mile (1.6 km) dirt oval, with straight chutes for six furlong and 1¼ mile races.

Ogden Corporation bought the track in 1969. In 2000, Ogden sold the track to Bill Stiritz, then the chairman of Ralston Purina.

Fairmount Park offers simulcast wagering from tracks throughout the country. It also operates four off-track betting facilities in Alton, Carbondale, Springfield and Sauget, Illinois; a fifth OTB facility in Grayville, Illinois, closed in early 2007.

As recently as 1997, Fairmount Park offered as many as 232 live racing days per year. But in recent years, the track has suffered greatly with the advent of riverboat casinos in the St. Louis metropolitan area. Racing dates have declined to 90 per year, on Tuesdays, Fridays and Saturdays.

In 2007, track management announced a plan to build a 20,000-seat amphitheater at the track and expand live racing (including the reinstatement of harness racing), pending approval by state lawmakers to allow slot machines to be installed, similar to racinos in nearby locations. When the legislature did not approve slots in its regular session, Fairmount management applied to the Illinois Racing Board for 90 days of live racing, but said that if lawmakers did not approve relief for horse tracks in its November veto session, the track would only run 60 days, citing declining attendance and betting handle, competition from casinos, and overpayment of the horsemen's account for purses. The track's general manager claimed that purses at the track were less than half that of similar tracks in neighboring Kentucky and Indiana. The request was granted with those conditions intact.

From 2020 to 2024, Fairmount Park Racetrack was known as FanDuel Sportsbook and Racing, under a partnership with FanDuel which opened a sportsbook inside the clubhouse. 2024 saw the track sold to gaming machine operator Accel Entertainment. The new ownership restored the traditional name of Fairmont Park, converting part of the grandstand into a racino. More than 200 slot machines and electronic table games were installed, with Accel committing more than $85 million into enhancements to the track including a new, permanent casino building.
