= Garrett K. Gomez =

American jockey (1972–2016)

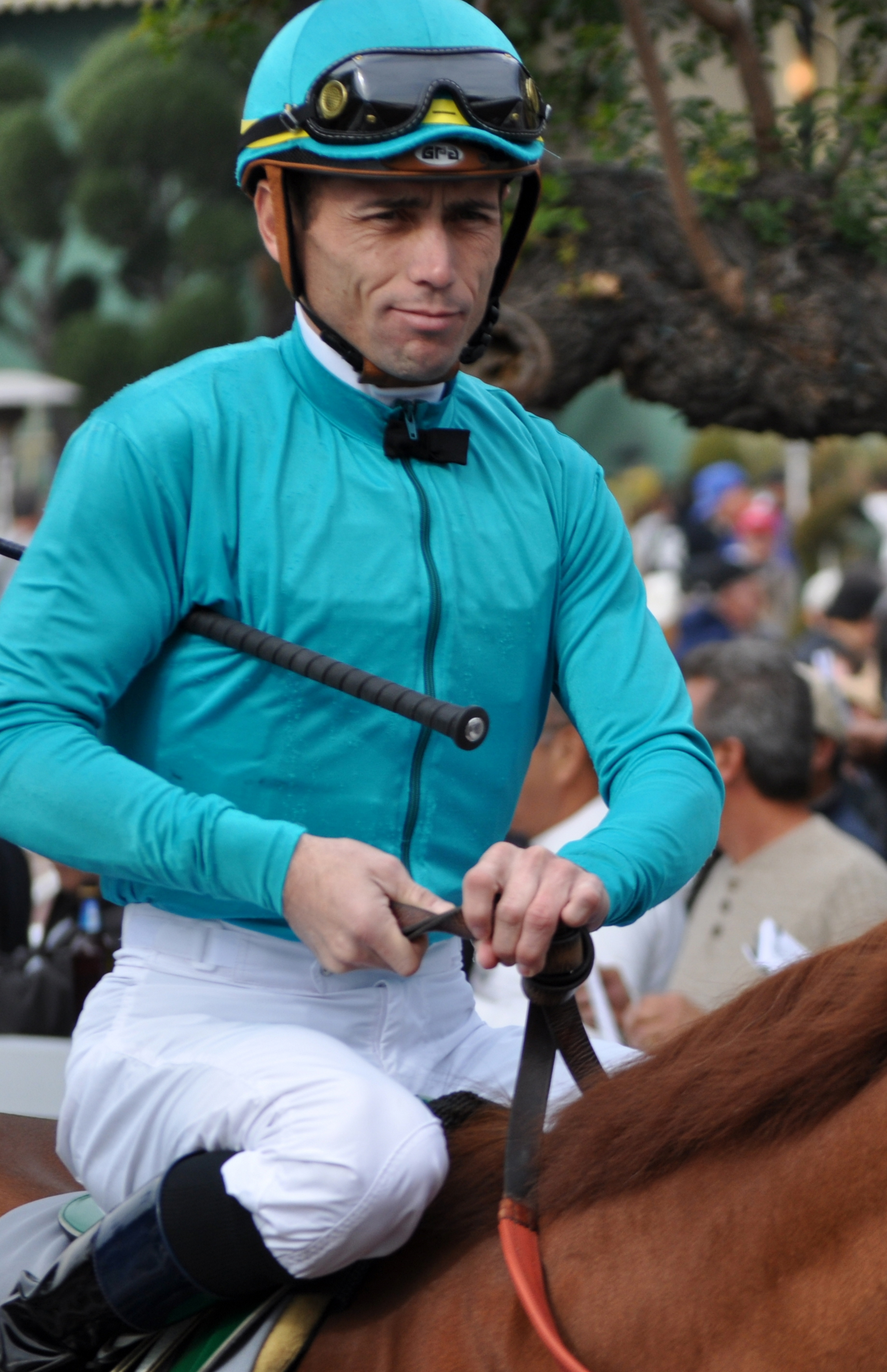
- Gomez in 2009

Personal information
- Born: January 1, 1972 Tucson, Arizona, U.S.
- Died: December 14, 2016 (aged 44) near Tucson, Arizona, U.S.
- Occupation: Jockey

Horse racing career
- Sport: Horse racing
- Career wins: 3,769

Major racing wins
- Arlington Oaks (1992, 1997); Secretariat Stakes (1997); Citation Handicap (1998, 2006); Frank E. Kilroe Mile Handicap (1999); Goodwood Breeders' Cup Handicap (1999); Malibu Stakes (1999, 2012); Santa Maria Handicap(1999); Del Mar Debutante Stakes (2000); Pacific Classic (2000, 2001, 2005, 2008); Spinster Stakes (2000, 2007); Del Mar Oaks (2001, 2009); Charles Whittingham Memorial Handicap (2002); Cigar Mile Handicap (2005, 2006); Del Mar Futurity (2005, 2007, 2009); Jockey Club Gold Cup (2005); La Brea Stakes (2005); Lady's Secret Handicap (2005); Vosburgh Stakes (2005); American Oaks (2006); Blue Grass Stakes (2006); Garden City Handicap (2006); Hollywood Turf Cup Stakes (2006, 2007); Hudson Stakes (NYB) (2006); Humana Distaff Handicap (2006); Hopeful Stakes (2006, 2007); Shadwell Turf Mile Stakes (2006); Turf Classic Stakes (2006); Wood Memorial Stakes (2006); Yellow Ribbon Stakes (2006); Frizette Stakes (2007); Haskell Invitational Handicap (2007); Kentucky Oaks (2007); Las Virgenes Stakes (2007, 2013); Oak Tree Mile Stakes (2008); Santa Anita Oaks (2007, 2013); Santa Monica Handicap (2007, 2009); John C. Mabee Handicap (2008, 2011); Just A Game Handicap (2008); Santa Margarita Invitational Handicap (2008, 2009, 2011); Vinery Madison Stakes (2008, 2011); Travers Stakes (2008); CashCall Futurity (2008, 2009); Santa Anita Derby (2009); Manhattan Handicap (2009); Norfolk Stakes (United States) (2009); Ancient Title Stakes (2009); Matriarch Stakes (2009); Stephen Foster Handicap (2010); United Nations Stakes (2010); Prioress Stakes (2010); Whitney Handicap (2010); Sword Dancer Invitational Handicap (2010); Spinaway Stakes (2010); Hollywood Derby (2010); Vanity Handicap (2011, 2012); Shoemaker Mile Stakes (2012); Rodeo Drive Stakes (2012); Hollywood Starlet Stakes (2012) Breeders' Cup wins: Breeders' Cup Juvenile (2005, 2008); Breeders' Cup Mile (2005); Breeders' Cup Sprint (2007, 2008); Breeders' Cup Juvenile Fillies (2007, 2012); Breeders' Cup Filly & Mare Sprint (2008); Breeders' Cup Dirt Mile (2008); Breeders' Cup Ladies' Classic (2009); Breeders' Cup Juvenile Fillies Turf (2010); Breeders' Cup Juvenile Turf (2010); Breeders' Cup Classic (2010) International race wins: Godolphin Mile (2007); Woodbine Mile (2007, 2009); Northern Dancer Breeders' Cup Turf (2008); Canadian International Stakes (2009); Dubai Golden Shaheen (2010); Nearctic Stakes (2010); Summer Stakes (2010)

Racing awards
- United States Champion Jockey by earnings (2006, 2007, 2008, 2009); Eclipse Award for Outstanding Jockey (2007, 2008); George Woolf Memorial Jockey Award (2011); National Museum of Racing and Hall of Fame (2017)

Significant horses
- Any Given Saturday, Beholder, Blame, Borrego, Concern, Colonel John, Discreet Cat, Honor Glide, Hystericalady, Indian Blessing, Midnight Lute, Rags to Riches, Skimming, Stevie Wonderboy, Wait A While, Life Is Sweet, Blind Luck, Ruler on Ice, Pioneerof the Nile
- Updated on March 27, 2010

Garrett Keith Gomez (January 1, 1972 – December 14, 2016) was an American Thoroughbred jockey who won two Eclipse Awards and thirteen Breeders' Cup races during his career.

== Racing career ==
=== Early career ===
Gomez learned to ride by watching his father, Louie, who was a jockey at many tracks in the Southwest United States. When Gomez was in the tenth grade, he dropped out of school to start his career as a jockey, and began riding at Santa Fe Downs in New Mexico in September 1988, picking up his first victory at that venue aboard Furlong Circle.

After a stint riding on the California Fair Circuit, Gomez switched his tack to the Midwest and rode at Ak-Sar-Ben and Fonner Park in Nebraska. Gomez was the second leading apprentice rider in 1989, racking up 182 winners.

In the mid-1990s, Gomez's career began to take off. He won back-to-back runnings of the Arkansas Derby in 1994 (with Concern) and 1995 (with Dazzling Falls). Two years later, he captured the "Mid-America Triple" at Arlington Park by winning the American Derby, Arlington Classic, and his first Grade I, the Secretariat Stakes, all aboard Honor Glide.

After his triumphs in the Midwest, Gomez moved west to California, and was successful right away, as he won the 1998 Hollywood Park Fall Meet riding title. In 1999, Gomez picked up four Grade I victories on the West Coast, as he took the Malibu Stakes with Love That Red, the Santa Maria Handicap with India Divina, the Frank E. Kilroe Mile Handicap with Lord Smith, and the Goodwood Breeders' Cup Handicap with Budroyale.

In 2000, Gomez rode Skimming, owned by Juddmonte Farms and trained by Robert J. Frankel, who would give Gomez back-to-back victories in the Grade 1 Pacific Classic Stakes at Del Mar. Gomez also took the Grade I Del Mar Debutante Stakes in 2000 aboard Cindy's Hero.

=== Legal troubles and return ===
After battling substance-abuse issues and serving jail time in 2003, Gomez returned to riding in 2004. In 2005, he paired up with Borrego, who gave him his first victory in the Jockey Club Gold Cup and his record third victory in the Pacific Classic Stakes, and on the second anniversary of his entering rehab, Gomez won two Breeders' Cup events, the Breeders' Cup Juvenile with Stevie Wonderboy and the Breeders' Cup Mile with Artie Schiller. Gomez won the riding title at Hollywood Park in their spring-summer meet.

Then in 2006, jockey John Velazquez was injured in a riding accident at Keeneland, which meant that trainer Todd Pletcher needed a new lead rider on the East Coast, and turned to Gomez. Gomez won 16 stakes races aboard Pletcher-trained horses, including five Grade I races. Thanks in part to those victories, Gomez led the nation in earnings for a jockey with over $20.1 million. He was a finalist for the Eclipse Award for the Outstanding Jockey, which was ultimately won that year by Edgar Prado.

Like most jockeys, Gomez also suffered multiple injuries throughout his career.

=== Career peak ===
In 2007, Gomez broke Jerry Bailey's record for most stakes victories in a season by winning 76 stakes races, including two Breeders' Cup races, the Breeders' Cup Juvenile Fillies with undefeated Eclipse Award winner Indian Blessing and the Breeders' Cup Sprint with Midnight Lute.

Early in the year, Gomez was the rider for Rags to Riches, winning the Las Virgenes Stakes, the Santa Anita Oaks and the Kentucky Oaks with her. In the Belmont Stakes, he was booked to ride Hard Spun, which left the mount open on Rags To Riches for John Velazquez to pick up and win with.

At the end of the year, thanks to his stakes victory record and his $22.8 million in earnings, Gomez won the Eclipse Award for the Outstanding Jockey.

Gomez also tied with jockey Victor Espinoza for the riding title at Santa Anita in 2007.

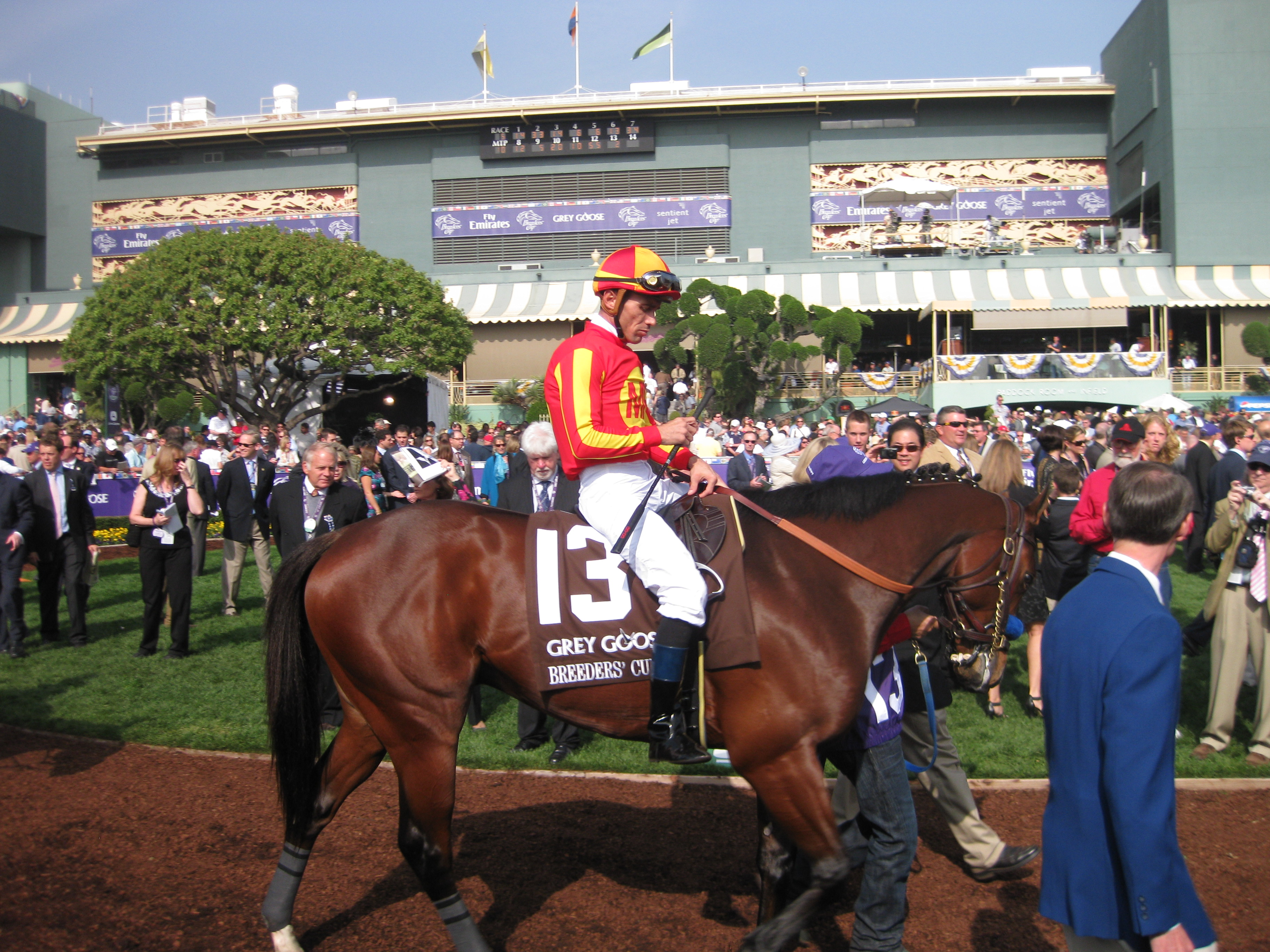
On Lookin At Lucky at the 2009 Breeder's Cup Juvenile

Gomez earned his 3,000th win aboard Hyperbaric in the Oak Tree Mile Stakes on September 28, 2008. He won four races at the Breeders' Cup and was again the leading jockey by nationwide earnings. He had a chance to surpass the record for earnings by a jockey in one season, which is held by Jerry Bailey, but fell just over $10,000 short. It is likely Gomez would've broken the record, but he was injured in a spill at Santa Anita on the final Saturday of 2008 and had to miss the following race card where Proudinsky, who he was scheduled to ride, won the $150,000 San Gabriel Handicap. He won his second Eclipse Award for Outstanding Jockey in 2008.

In 2009, Gomez won his fourth straight earnings title in a close contest with Julien Leparoux that was only decided when Gomez won the last race of the year at Santa Anita aboard Cenizo. "To have to go down to actually my last mount of the year is unreal," said Gomez. "I was lucky enough to pick up the winner. I was hanging around the jockeys' room hoping to pick up something and Martin (Pedroza, the regular rider of Cenizo) didn't feel well."

In 2010 Gomez picked up his biggest win to date when he won the Breeders' Cup Classic with Blame, handing champion mare Zenyatta her only loss in the process. That marked his third Breeders' Cup win of the weekend, despite the fact he was injured in a spill just a day before the two-day Breeders' Cup program. Gomez also won the Stephen Foster Handicap and the Whitney Handicap with Blame, helping the horse get the Eclipse Award for American Champion Older Male Horse. Gomez also won his first riding title at Keeneland Race Course during the spring meet.

Gomez also won some major races outside of the United States. At Woodbine Racetrack in Ontario, Canada, he won the Woodbine Mile in both 2007 and 2009; the Northern Dancer Breeders' Cup Turf in 2008; the Canadian International Stakes in 2009, and the Nearctic Stakes and Summer Stakes in 2010. He also won two big races in Dubai, the Godolphin Mile in 2007 and the Dubai Golden Shaheen in 2010.

In 2011, he received the George Woolf Memorial Jockey Award from his peers. "He's just an American success story," said his agent Ron Anderson. "He and his family have been through a lot and Garrett has been very upfront in dealing with all of this. Professionally, his accomplishments speak for themselves. He's won 12 Breeders' Cup races over the past six years and nobody in the history of the sport has done that."

In May 2012, he teamed up with Dr. Tony Ryan Book Award winner Rudolph Alvarado to write The Garrett Gomez Story: A Jockey's Journey Through Addiction & Salvation. The book captures the story behind Gomez' lifelong struggle to overcome his addiction to alcohol and drugs. Gomez rode Beholder to victory in the 2012 Breeders' Cup Juvenile Fillies, his thirteenth win at the Breeders' Cup.

=== 2013 and retirement from horse racing ===
Gomez started 2013 by guiding the filly to victories in the Las Virgenes and Santa Anita Oaks. However, he suffered a relapse in his fight against alcoholism in the summer and missed time from the saddle as a result. He returned later in the year at Del Mar and also made appearances at Belmont and Woodbine, but he then left again during the fall meet at Keeneland.

On June 8, 2015, Gomez announced his retirement from horse racing on his Facebook page. He said, "I would like to thank everyone in the sport of horse racing for all the support I ever received in my career. I enjoyed every horse I ever rode and I thank all of them for making my career. I'd like to apologize to all my fans for leaving the sport the way I did. Sometimes you have to do things in life for yourself. I'd like everyone to know I'm officially retired from the sport of horse racing. I thank everyone for all I achieved that had a part in my career. I had a lot of awesome moments in this game."

In 2017 Gomez was posthumously inducted into the National Museum of Racing and Hall of Fame.

== Personal life ==
Gomez had four children: Shelby and Collin with his first wife Beth, and Amanda and Jared with his second wife Pam.

Gomez was found dead in his hotel room at the Casino Del Sol in Tucson, Arizona on December 14, 2016. The cause of death was determined to be an accidental overdose of methamphetamine.

== Year-end charts ==
Chart (2000–present)	Rank
National Earnings List for Jockeys 2000	21
National Earnings List for Jockeys 2001	19
National Earnings List for Jockeys 2002	48
National Earnings List for Jockeys 2005	5
National Earnings List for Jockeys 2006	1
National Earnings List for Jockeys 2007	1
National Earnings List for Jockeys 2008	1
National Earnings List for Jockeys 2009	1
National Earnings List for Jockeys 2010	4
National Earnings List for Jockeys 2011	8
National Earnings List for Jockeys 2012	12
National Earnings List for Jockeys 2013	28

== See also ==
- List of jockeys
- Thoroughbred horse racing
