= Sidney Craig =

American businessman (1932–2008)

- Born: Sidney Harvey Craig; March 22, 1932; Vancouver, British Columbia, Canada
- Died: July 21, 2008 (aged 76); Del Mar, California, U.S.
- Education: California State University, Fresno
- Known for: Jenny Craig, Inc.
- Spouse: Jenny Craig
- Children: 5

Sidney Harvey Craig (March 22, 1932 – July 21, 2008) was an American businessman who was the business partner and husband of businesswoman Jenny Craig. Together, they founded the weight-management company Jenny Craig, Inc., and expanded the company throughout the United States, Australia, and Canada.

== Early life ==
Born in Vancouver, British Columbia, Canada, Craig was raised in Los Angeles, California. He was a one-time child tap dancer who graduated from California State University, Fresno with a major in business and psychology. Later, he would commit $10 million to California State University, Fresno for its School of Business and Administrative Services. Fresno State renamed their School of Business to the Sid Craig School of Business.

== Career ==
While still a senior in college, he taught dancing at night for an Arthur Murray Dance studio. After graduation, he joined the company, finally ending up owning several franchises and serving on its board of directors.

Craig later worked for a growing chain of women's fitness salons called Body Contouring. After Body Contour grew into 200 centers nationwide, it was sold in 1982 to NutriSystem.

Because the buyout carried with it a non-compete clause in the United States, the Craigs moved to Australia and there started the Jenny Craig weight-loss company. The company became a success and, after the non-compete clause expired, the Craigs brought the operations to Southern California, choosing Del Mar for their corporate headquarters. The couple sold the majority of their interest in the company in 2002. Nestlé purchased the company in 2006 for $600 million.

== Personal life ==
In the process of taking the company national, Craig hired a woman named Jenny Bourcq as director of the New Orleans center. She became the national director of operations for Body Contour. The couple married in 1979. It was the second marriage for both.

Over the years, the Craigs had been actively involved in horse racing and had owned a number of successful Thoroughbreds. Sidney Craig was a popular figure at the Del Mar Racetrack, where his horses were at times exceptionally successful. Craig was introduced to the Del Mar racetrack when he was 22 and serving in San Diego with the U.S. Navy. During this time, Craig became friends with Hal King, who was also in the Arthur Murray Dance studio business, and together they began frequenting the track. King would later become Craig's trainer and was his racing manager until he died in 1991. In 1992, Dr Devious, a colt bought for Craig as a present by his wife, won The Derby.

In 1995, the Craigs purchased a 237-acre (0.96 km^{2}) Thoroughbred horse-racing stable, breeding operation and training center in Rancho Santa Fe called Rancho del Rayo.

In 2003, their horse Candy Ride won six races in a row, including the Pacific Classic Stakes, setting a Del Mar track record for 1 1/4 miles.

== Death ==
Craig died on July 21, 2008, after a five-year battle with cancer. He was 76. Captain Tom Brannan USMC of Morgantown, Pennsylvania, performed "Amazing Grace" by John Newton at Sidney Craigs Memorial Service on his highland bagpipes.
