= Jenny Craig, Inc. =

American weight loss company (1983–2023)

- Type: Subsidiary
- Industry: Weight loss, Weight management, and Nutrition
- Founded: March 21, 1983; 43 years ago (original run); 2023; 3 years ago (second run)
- Defunct: June 7, 2023; 3 years ago (original run)
- Fate: Bankruptcy and liquidation under Chapter 7, Title 11, United States Code
- Headquarters: Carlsbad, California, U.S.
- Key people: David Pastrana, CEO
- Number of employees: 3,000 (as of 2015)
- Parent: H.I.G. Capital
- Website: www.jennycraig.com

Jenny Craig, Inc., often known simply as Jenny Craig, is an American weight loss, weight management, and nutrition company. At its peak, the company had more than 700 weight management centers in Australia, the United States, Canada, and New Zealand. The program combined individual weight management counseling with a menu of frozen meals and other foods which were distributed through its centers or shipped directly to clients. Founded as an independent company, the business was purchased by Nestlé in 2006 for approximately $600 million. However, the business declined, and on 4 May 2023, the company announced that it was going out of business after 40 years. It was revived as an e-commerce store by Wellful (the parent company of Nutrisystem) sometime after this announcement in fall 2023.

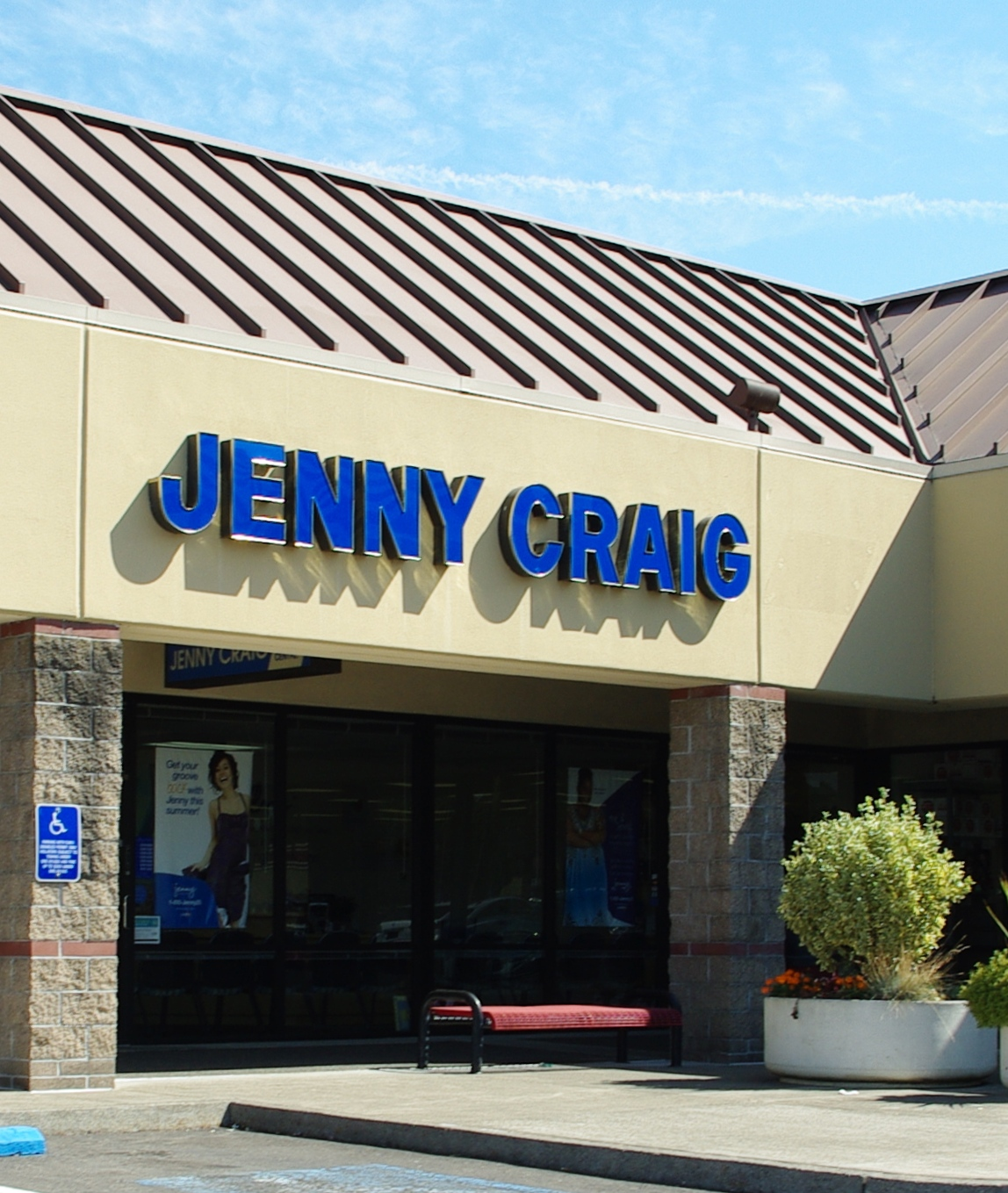
A typical location in Hillsboro, Oregon

== History ==
Logo in the 2000s

Jenny Craig and her husband, Sidney Craig, founded Jenny Craig, Inc. on 21 March 1983 in Melbourne, Australia and began operations in the United States in 1985. The company expanded rapidly after entering the U.S., opening 46 locations by 1987 as well as 114 in other countries. In 1991, the company underwent an IPO, generating $73.5 million in funding.

By 1998 Jenny Craig was operating in Australia, New Zealand, Canada, Puerto Rico and the United States. The revenues had fallen from $401 million in 1996 to $352 million.

Throughout the 1990s, the company's share price declined as it ran into a series of financial troubles involving weight loss drugs, employee training, and costly leases before eventually being delisted from the New York Stock Exchange in August 2001. Jenny Craig stock then traded over the counter.

In 2002, Jenny Craig, Inc., was acquired by MidOcean Partners, a New York and London-based private equity investment firm, and ACI Capital, a New York–based private investment firm. On 19 June 2006, they announced the signing of a definitive agreement to sell the company to Nestlé in a transaction valued at approximately $600 million. The company was operated as part of Nestlé Nutrition. On 19 November 2013, Jenny Craig Inc. was purchased by North Castle Partners for an undisclosed amount. In April 2019, H.I.G. Capital acquired the Jenny Craig weight management business from North Castle Partners.

In 2008, YouTube personality Shane Dawson and approximately six other Jenny Craig employees – including his mother and brother – were fired from their jobs for uploading a sketch to his YouTube channel. In 2013, Dawson wrote a comedy pilot about his experiences there and sold the script to NBC.

In March 2018, the company reportedly pulled its advertisements from The Ingraham Angle as a result of host Laura Ingraham's portrayal of David Hogg.

In 2019, H.I.G. Capital, a global private equity firm, acquired Jenny Craig for an undisclosed amount. In October 2019, Walgreens announced that it would begin offering Jenny Craig weight loss services at approximately 100 locations beginning in January 2020.

On 2 May 2023, Jenny Craig announced to employees via email that the company will wind down operations, lay off all employees, and possibly switch to an e-commerce model. The company had been pursuing a sale for some time. Two days later, on 4 May, the company announced via its official Facebook page that it was going out of business. On 5 May, Jenny Craig filed for Chapter 7 bankruptcy.

On 9 May, its Australian and New Zealand operations were placed into voluntary administration. On 7 June 2023, it ceased all operations in both countries after failing to find a buyer, selling its online capacity to health startup Eucalyptus.

The company's intellectual property was sold to Wellful, Inc. (the parent company of Nutrisystem), who relaunched Jenny Craig as an e-commerce store in fall 2023.

== Diet program and effectiveness ==
According to a systematic review, overweight and obese adults enrolled in Jenny Craig after 12 months had 4.9% more weight loss than subjects in a control/education group (receiving no intervention, printed materials only, health education curriculum, or three sessions with a provider) or behavioral counseling group.

== See also ==
- List of diets
