= Energy policy of Canada =

Canada total primary energy consumption by source in 2015
1. Coal (6.00%)
2. Natural gas (28.0%)
3. Hydro (26.0%)
4. Nuclear (7.00%)
5. Oil (31.0%)
6. Renewable energy (2.00%)

Development of CO2 emissions

Canada has access to all main sources of energy including oil and gas, coal, hydropower, biomass, solar, geothermal, wind, marine and nuclear. It is the world's second largest producer of uranium, third largest producer of hydro-electricity, fifth largest natural gas producer, and the fifth largest producer of crude oil. In 2023, only Russia, China, the United States and Saudi Arabia produced more total energy than Canada.

The United States is Canada's major trade market for energy products and services. Canada sent around 98% of its total energy exports to the United States in 2015, meaning that Canada is the largest supplier of energy exports to the world's largest economy by nominal GDP. Canada also exports significant amounts of uranium and coal to Asia, Europe and Latin America.

Canada is a net exporter of energy products. In 2024, Canada exported $199.1 billion of energy products and imported $57.9 billion for a net of $141.2 billion of exports

In 2025, Canda exported 249.9 million cubic meters of crude oil and equivalent products. The United States remained the main destination, receiving 222.7 million cubic meters, while exports to other countries rose to 27.2 million cubic meters.

Canada has a robust energy profile with abundant and diverse resources. The energy and climate policies in Canada are interrelated. These energy and climate policies are implemented at both the federal and provincial government level. The federal government is responsible for establishing objectives for the entire country and the provincial governments are responsible for enforcing these objectives and developing the methods to achieve these goals. In 2015, the federal and provincial governments created a national agreement for cooperating in boosting the nation's energy industry while transitioning to a low-carbon economy. Provincial governments are developing their own strategies in order to reach the national goals. In 2016, Prince Edward Island Strategy became one of the first provinces to develop their own strategies in response to the federal agreement goals.

== Background ==
"Canada has been dependent on energy imports largely because of the great distances separating indigenous sources of supply from markets. It is therefore primarily as a result of geography, rather than geology, that questions concerning the importation, export and particularly the transportation of energy have preoccupied energy policymakers."

— François Bregha, Energy Policy. (1999)

Aspects of Canada's "unique" political and economic reality affect its federal energy strategies. Canada has "significant resources of conventional and unconventional oil, natural gas and hydroelectricity" and has become "one of the world’s largest energy producers." According to a 2015 Canadian Global Affairs Institute (CGAI), the "design and structure" of Canadian federalism has resulted in an "unwillingness of the federal government to commit to a national vision in most resource issues for fear of risking political capital in debates with those provinces who resist cooperative resource development." Canada was one of the few OECD countries that did not have a national energy policy. The authors of the 2003 publication, Power Switch: Energy Regulatory Governance in the 21st Century, wrote that "Canada has one of the most divided and decentralized constitutional arrangements for energy among Western industrialized countries."

Since 1867, the rules of Canadian federalism ensure that "individual provinces own, market and control energy exports" of energy resources contained within their own provincial borders. The federal government has the responsibility over infrastructure between provinces, which includes pipelines.

One of the major challenges of energy policy in Canada concerns geography not geology. The majority of energy consumers live in Ontario and Quebec and the major energy producers are located in the east and west. Canada's energy policies attempt to reconcile the economic interests of energy consumers who want the cheapest product, with the challenge of transporting indigenous energy products—such as coal from Nova Scotia in the 19th century for example, or oil and gas from Alberta—over long distances at competitive prices.

In the post-Confederation period one of the most important energy policy debates involved Nova Scotia's coal producers who sought tariffs that would protect their industry against imports of cheaper coal from the American midwest. Coal consumers in central Canada wanted free trade which would ensure access to the less expensive American coal which involved much lower transportation costs. In his 1982 publication entitled Fuels and the National Policy, John N. McDougall wrote that debates on energy policies in Canada pitted those who proposed free markets for energy products, regardless of national origin, against those who called for government intervention through tariffs and other means.

In 1946, the Atomic Energy Control Act was passed and the Atomic Energy Control Board (AECB) was established to regulate the production and uses of uranium in Canada, under the premiership of William Lyon Mackenzie King. The federal government took over the jurisdiction over uranium from the provinces.

The Royal Commission on Energy (1957–1959)−the Borden Commission—established by then-Prime Minister, John Diefenbaker, resulted in new legislation—the National Energy Board Act—Canada's "first integrated federal energy statute". In 1957, oil producers in the western provinces sought federal support for the construction of a pipeline to provide them with access to eastern markets. Eastern oil refiners were purchasing cheap oil mainly from the Middle East. In 1959, the NEB was advised by a New York oil consultant Walter J. Levy to not build the proposed Edmonton-to-Montreal pipeline. Levy also recommended that "Alberta oil should go to U.S. markets."

In 1961, the National Oil Policy (NOP) was adopted through which the NEB accepted Mr. Levy's recommendations, and was the cornerstone of Canada's energy policy until the NOP ended in September 1973. The NOP fostered growth of the fledgling oil industry in Western Canada, which had begun with discovery of oil in Leduc, Alberta in 1947. According to a 2009 article in the Alberta Oil Magazine, the NOP made "consumers buy more Alberta oil and pay a premium over international prices that were depressed at the time. All of Canada west of the Ottawa River was reserved as an exclusive market for domestic production by a federal ban against cheaper imports." The NOP "established a protected market for domestic oil west of the Ottawa Valley, which freed the industry from foreign competition", while the five eastern provinces, which included major refineries in Ontario and Quebec, continued to rely on foreign imports of crude oil, for example from Venezuela. There were no major oil and gas policies made during the rest of the 1960s, a period marked stable fuel prices by increase in oil and gas consumption.

During the Premiership of John Diefenbaker from 1957 to 1963, and that of his successor, Lester B. Pearson, there was a focus on increased development of electricity resources for both domestic and export to the United States and to improve interprovincial transmission systems which many hoped would become a national electricity grid. In 1963, Pearson's administration introduced the National Power Policy. However, the installation of interprovincial transmission lines was politically sensitive. If federal policies forced provinces to comply they would be accused of being heavy-handed. Some provinces preferred to market their excess power to the United States to escape the perceived burden of federalism. The premiers of Newfoundland and Quebec were engaged in a decades-long dispute over transmission of electricity from Newfoundland's Churchill Falls hydroelectric project on the lower portion of the Churchill River through the province of Quebec. Then Newfoundland Premier Smallwood, had appealed to Prime Minister Pearson to "strengthen provisions for interprovincial transmission of electricity".

In response to the provinces' increasing concerns about federal funding programs, the Federal-Provincial Fiscal Arrangements and Established Programs Financing Act of 1977 was passed which gave the provinces more autonomy. It resulted in significant decentralization of government that favoured the provinces.

The 1980 National Energy Program (NEP), which was introduced during the Premiership of Pierre Trudeau, was one of the "most controversial policy initiatives in Canadian history". It was introduced by the federal Liberal government, against the backdrop of the global recession following the Energy crisis of the 1970s—which included two major oil price shocks: the 1973 oil crisis and the 1979 oil crisis, From the mid-1970s to mid-1980s, energy policies—particularly policy regarding the oil and gas industry—was a very "contentious", and "high profile" intergovernmental issue, which had a "deletrious effect on federal-provincial relations".

By 1986, during the Premiership of Brian Mulroney, provincial-federal relationships improved with greater cooperation regarding energy policies, largely because the international energy situation had changed. Prime Minister Mulroney entered into three "important intergovernmental agreements in the energy sector". Federal-provincial accords and agreements included policies related to "management of Newfoundland's offshore resources, oil pricing and taxation in the western provinces, and natural gas pricing in western Canada." The NEP was dismantled through the Western Accord, market oriented agreement which brought in full deregulation of oil prices, "abolished import subsidies, the export tax on crude and oil products, and the petroleum compensation charge. It also phased out PIP grants and the PGRT. In addition, controls were lifted on oil exports."

Other major agreements and accords between the provinces and the federal government include the 1994 Agreement on Internal Trade (AIT), the 1999 Social Union Framework Agreement (SUFA) and the 2003 Council of the Federation (COF).

Energy production, energy resource marketing, equity investment in the energy sector, environmental issues, relationships First Nations peoples, are more complex because of the nature of Canadian federalism. Throughout Canada's history, federal powers and policies have fluctuated between centralization and de-centralization. By 2015, Canada faced a deepening dilemma regarding energy export potential.

In 2014, under the Premiership of Stephen Harper, the federal government focused on three main principles underlying its energy policies—market orientation, "respect for jurisdictional authority and the role of the provinces", and when necessary, "targeted intervention in the market process to achieve specific policy objectives through regulation or other means." In 2014, Canada Natural Resources described how federal-provincial agreements and accords had informed Canada's energy policy including the Western Accord on oil and gas pricing and taxation with the provinces of Alberta, Saskatchewan and British Columbia, the Agreement on Natural Gas Markets and Prices with Alberta, Saskatchewan and British Columbia, and the Atlantic Accords with Nova Scotia, Newfoundland and Labrador, which included the creation of the Offshore Boards. International agreements that impact on Canada's energy policy include the North American Free Trade Agreement (NAFTA). In 2014, the NRC listed the National Energy Board (NEB) (1959-2019) the Canadian Nuclear Safety Commission, the Atomic Energy of Canada Limited, and the Program on Energy Research and Development as contributors to the development of Canada's energy policy.

During the Premiership of Justin Trudeau, Canada entered into the Canada-EU Strategic Partnership Agreement in 2018, which includes the High Level Energy Dialogue (HLED), on "energy policy issues, such as market transparency, maintaining a safe, sustainable and competitive energy supply, as well as research and development in the energy industries with a focus on "transition toward a low carbon future, addressing market barriers and 'clean financing'." The EU's 2018 modern energy policy legislative framework called "Clean Energy for All Europeans" includes "regulatory certainty" with "binding renewable energy and energy efficiency targets", "national energy and climate plans", creates a "new energy ecosystem" and a market for Canadian "transition fuels (e.g. LNG), clean technologies, and services."

During the 2019 federal election campaign, both the Liberals and Conservatives had "agreed to try to hit existing Paris commitments to reduce greenhouse gas emissions by 30 per cent by 2030." The Canada research chair in climate and energy policy, Nicholas Rivers, said that there is not enough discussion of "renewable technologies such as wind power, solar and zero-emissions aluminum" in the electricity sector. Rivers said that, "Canadian governments have a terrible record at hitting their climate targets...What matters is what impact the policies will have on these emissions....We should be pretty cautious, because we haven't got a great deal of data to look at in terms of what the effects of these policies will actually be...Things are changing more rapidly than we imagined." Rivers said that the "federal government’s climate goals and Canada's oil and gas industry are [not] fundamentally incompatible." There is, however, "some tension between them."

In June 2018, NRCAN's Generation Energy Council submitted their report entitled "Canada's Energy Transition: Getting to Our Energy Future, Together", which examined Canada's "long-term energy future", "generational goals", "guiding principles", and "potential pathways and milestones." The report by NRC's Generation Energy Council was informed by a 2017 national dialogue which included a Generation Energy Forum held in Winnipeg in October, on a "low-carbon energy future". In December 2017, Natural Resources Canada established the Generation Energy Council, composed of "energy thought leaders with diverse perspectives and expertise on Canada's energy systems" as a follow-up to the forum. According to the "Canada’s Energy Transition" report, the decoupling of Canadian energy use and GDP growth from 1990 to 2015, was confirmed by statistics showing that during that period, Canada's GDP grew by almost 80 percent, while Canadian energy use increased by only 30 percent.

In June 2016, Prime Minister Trudeau, said that he supported "interprovincial efforts to get carbon emissions down and emphasize hydroelectricity as a power source." BC Hydro's $8.8-billion John Horgan Dam hydroelectric project on Peace River in northeastern B.C. which is slated for completion in 2024, would supply electricity to Alberta to decrease Alberta's dependency on natural gas and coal.

In April 2020, during the 2020 coronavirus pandemic, Prime Minister Trudeau's energy policy appeared to appease both environmentalists and the oil industry. The COVID-19 recession, the 2020 stock market crash, and the 2020 Russia–Saudi Arabia oil price war which resulted in the "collapse in oil prices", left Alberta with its "greatest challenge" in the province's "modern history, threatening its main industry and wreaking havoc on its finances." While announcing a "series of measures to support the oil and gas industry", Trudeau said that "Just because we're in a health crisis doesn't mean we can neglect the environmental crisis." Some of the "measures had a complementary goal of addressing serious environmental concerns."

== International Energy Statistics (IEA) as of 2014 ==
Energy in Canada
	Capita	Prim. energy	Production	Export	Electricity	CO_{2} emission
	Million	TWh	TWh	TWh	TWh	Mt
2004	31.95	3,129	4,623	1,558	549	551
2007	32.98	3,133	4,805	1,742	560	557
2008	33.33	3,103	4,738	1,683	568	551
2009	33.74	2,955	4,533	1,645	522	521
2010	34.11	2,929	4,627	1,741	516	536
2012	34.48	2,929	4,757	1,843	566	530
2012R	34.88	2,921	4,881	1,962	543	534
2013	35.15	2,945	5,060	2,146	546	536
Change 2004-10	6.8%	-6.4%	0.1%	11.7%	-5.9%	-2.6%
Mtoe = 11.63 TWh, Prim. energy includes energy losses that are 2/3 for nuclear power 2012R = CO_{2} calculation criteria changed, numbers updated

== Regulatory framework ==
According to a 2006 Natural Resources Canada report on legal and policy frameworks on energy in North America, Canada's federal system of government, jurisdiction over energy is divided between the federal and provincial and territorial governments. Provincial governments have jurisdiction over the exploration, development, conservation, and management of non-renewable resources, as well as the generation and production of electricity. Federal jurisdiction in energy is primarily concerned with regulation of inter-provincial and international trade and commerce, and the management of non-renewable resources on federal lands.

=== Federal regulation ===
The National Energy Board (NEB) was an independent federal regulatory agency that regulated the Canadian energy industry. The NEB was created in 1959 and reported through the Minister of Natural Resources to the Parliament of Canada. Its primary responsibilities included:

- Inter-provincial and international oil and gas pipelines and power lines,
- Export and import of natural gas under long-term licenses and short-term orders,
- Oil exports under long-term licenses and short-term orders (no applications for long-term exports have been filed in recent years), and
- Frontier lands and offshore areas not covered by provincial/federal management agreements.

The NEB was superseded by the Canadian Energy Regulator (CER) in 2019.

In 1985, the federal government and the provincial governments in Alberta, British Columbia and Saskatchewan agreed to deregulate the prices of crude oil and natural gas. Offshore oil Atlantic Canada is administered under joint federal and provincial responsibility in Nova Scotia and Newfoundland and Labrador.

=== Provincial regulation ===
Provincial regulation of oil and natural gas activities, pipelines, and distribution systems is administered by provincial utility boards. The producing provinces impose royalties and taxes on oil and natural gas production; provide drilling incentives; and grant permits and licenses to construct and operate facilities. The consuming provinces regulate distribution systems and oversee the retail price of natural gas to consumers. The key regulations with respect to the wholesale and retail electricity competition are at the provincial level. To date, two provinces (Alberta and Ontario) have initiated retail competition. In Alberta, the electricity sector is largely privatized, in Ontario the process is ongoing. In other provinces electricity is mostly generated and distributed by provincially owned utilities.

=== Fossil fuel subsidies in Canada ===
According to the 2 May 2019 International Monetary Fund (IMF) report, in 2015, Canada paid US$43 billion in post-tax energy subsidies which represents 2.9 percent of the GDP and an expenditure of US$1,191 per capita. On the eve of the 2015 United Nations Climate Change Conference (COP21) held in Paris, CBC news reported that G20 countries spend US$452 billion annually on fossil fuel subsidies. In the fiscal year 2013–2014, the federal government gave the petroleum industry approximately US$1.6 billion. The combined federal and provincial support for the petroleum industry during that period totaled almost US$2.7 billion. The CBC article cite the Overseas Development Institute 2015 report on G20 subsidies to oil, gas and coal production. The leaders of the G20 countries had pledged in 2011 to phase-out fossil fuel subsidies. In 2013–2014, Canada also provided a "high level of public finance"—several billion dollars—for fossil fuel production abroad. This included subsidies for oil and gas and fossil fuel-based electricity for state-owned enterprises (SOE), such as, Oil India, JOGMEC in Japan, KNOC in Korea, and EDF in France. The ODI report noted that as the global price of oil decreased, about 30 countries introduced fossil fuel consumer subsidy phase-out in 2014 and 2015. During that same period, fossil fuel-extracting companies in Canada "increased their pressure on governments" for help in remaining "competitive" by giving them "more tax breaks and other support."

In 2015, the Organization for Economic Co-operation and Development (OECD) published The OECD Inventory of Support Measures for Fossil Fuels 2015 and a Companion to the inventory. Canada prepared a Study of Federal Support to the Fossil Fuel Sector and the Office of the Auditor General of Canada compiled a report as part of a parliamentary enquiry in 2012. in 2013-2014 Canada spent US$2,738 million on subsidies for "upstream oil and gas, oil and gas pipelines, power plants and refining, multiple fossil fuels or unspecified, coal mining, and coal-fired power."

The ODI reported that by late 2015, the Canadian federal government was phasing out some subsidies to oil, gas and mining. By January 2015, the Athabasca oil sands "were no longer eligible for accelerated depreciation." They were "subject to the same tax regime as other oil, mining and gas development." The Atlantic Investment Tax Credit was also in the process of being phased out. The federal government introduced new fossil fuel subsidies in the form of "tax breaks for LNG production in the form of increased capital cost allowance rates that allow companies to deduct capital spending more quickly than was previously possible."

The Export Development Canada (EDC), Canada's export credit agency spent about $2.5 billion per year in 2013 and 2014 in the energy industries.

=== Constitutional issues ===
Canadian energy policy reflects the constitutional division of powers between the federal government and the provincial governments. The Constitution of Canada places natural resources under the jurisdiction of the provinces. However, the three prairie provinces originally did not control the natural resources in the provinces as a condition of their entry into Confederation, until the Natural Resources Acts of 1930. The provincial governments own most of the petroleum, natural gas and coal reserves, and control most of the electricity production. This means that the national government must coordinate its energy policies with those of the provincial governments, and intergovernmental conflicts sometimes arise. The problem is particularly acute since, while the energy consuming provinces have the bulk of the population and are able to elect federal governments which introduce policies favouring energy consumers, the energy producing provinces have the ability to defeat such policies by exercising their constitutional authority over natural resources.

Section 92A of the Constitution Act, 1867 assigned to the provincial governments the exclusive authority to make laws in relation to non-renewable resources and electrical energy, while Section 125 prevented the federal government from taxing any provincial government lands or property. On the other hand, the federal government has the power to make treaties with foreign countries. This has important implications for treaties involving energy production, like the Kyoto Protocol, which the Canadian government signed in 2002. Although the federal government had the authority to sign the treaty, it may require the cooperation of the provincial governments to enforce it.

== Energy policies ==
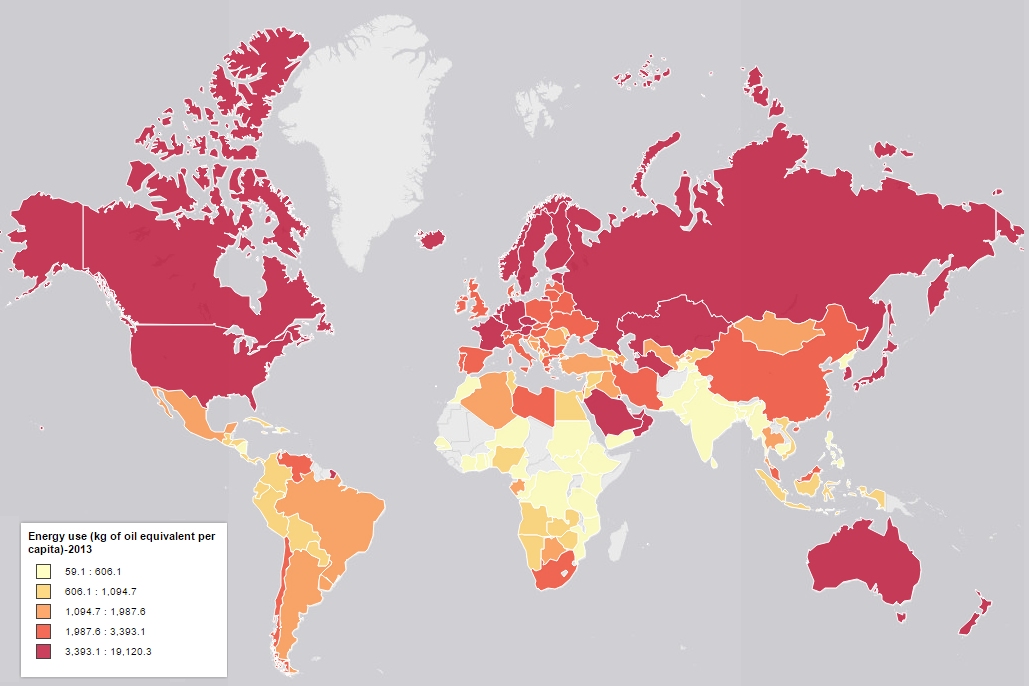
A map depicting world energy consumption per capita based on 2013 data from the World Bank

Canada has a robust energy profile with abundant and diverse resources. Energy and climate policies are interrelated. These policies are implemented at both the federal and provincial governmental level. A recent SWOT analysis conducted in 2013 of a Canadian energy and climate policies has shown that there is a lack of consistency between federal and regional strategies. The reason for this lack of consistency was attributed to the economic and environmental realities, the diversity of energy sources and energy demands that vary greatly among the Canadian provinces. As a result of the differing energy characteristics of the provinces there is creation of multiple federal and provincial strategies, sometimes complementary, but often contradictory.

The Canadian energy policy is based on three important principles. These principles are (1) competitive markets to ensure a successful and innovative energy system capable of meeting Canadian energy needs, (2) respecting the jurisdictions of provinces and the federal government and (3) targeted federal interventions in the energy trading process ensuring the specific energy-policy objectives are achieved.

In order to improve the coherence of provinces and federal policies a combination of policy tools have been instituted to facilitate collaboration between the federal and provincial governments. These policies tools have resulted in equal balance of federal and provincial government in the creation of energy policies. The federal government is responsible for establishing objectives for the entire country and the provincial governments are responsible for enforcing these objectives and developing the methods to achieve these goals.

In 2015, the federal government worked with Canada's provincial leaders and reached an agreement for cooperating in boosting the nation's industry while transitioning to a low-carbon economy. The critics of this agreement doubted that the provincial leaders would be to reach an agreement and they also doubted that they would be successful in forming a joint energy policy. However, this was not the case. After a three-day meeting in St. John's, Newfoundland and Labrador, the Council of the Federation released this report that set out their vision for a national energy strategy. This agreement is meant to guide energy policy among the provincial governments. This agreement seeks out to influence provinces to promote energy efficiency and conservation, transition to lower carbon economy and enhance energy information and awareness. The Prince Edward Island Strategy is a provincial strategy that was in response to meeting the federal government goals presented in this agreement.

== Coal ==
=== History of coal in Canada ===
Coal has been mined in Canada since 1639 when a small mine was opened at Grand Lake, New Brunswick. In 1720 French soldiers opened a mine in Cape Breton, Nova Scotia to supply the fortress of Louisbourg. Cape Breton later supplied coal to Boston and other American ports. Commercial mining in New Brunswick began in 1825 although most of the province's coal production has been used locally. In western Canada, coal was first mined on Vancouver Island from 1853. Starting in the 1880s, the building of the transcontinental railways through Alberta and British Columbia caused coal mines to be developed in various locations near railway lines in the prairies and mountains. By 1911 western mines produced most of the coal in Canada and, despite downturns, gradually expanded to produce over 95% of Canadian coal. Coal was subsidized in Canada from 1887. The mines of Cape Breton were involved in this tariff protection to help it compete against American coal entering Ontario via the Great Lakes. Cape Breton coal was dug underground then shipped to Toronto and Montreal. The vast industries of the east, including steel mills, were fueled with this coal. While there were difficulties and strikes, coal powered Canada into the Second World War. There were several Royal Commissions into coal: one in 1947 and other in 1965.

Federal involvement in Cape Breton continued with the Cape Breton Development Corporation, which was in reality a large subsidy. The completion of the trans-Canada pipeline, nuclear reactors and the Hibernia oil fields have finished coal in Nova Scotia. Coal is located on Vancouver Island: there are coal deposits in Cassidy, Nanaimo, Campbell River and Fort Rupert. Coal was mined at Nanaimo for 102 years from 1853 to 1955. In BC's interior coal was mined at Merritt, Coalmont, Fernie and Hudson's Hope. The development of coal mines in western Canada is integrally mixed with the building of railways—the Canadian Pacific Railway was directly involved with the Fernie mines. A separate railway—the Crow's Nest Line—was built to move coal from the Rockies to the smelter at Trail. Coal in Alberta underlays parts of the Rocky Mountains. Historically, there were pits in Lethbridge, Pincher Creek, Canmore and Nordegg.

The discovery of huge oil fields in western Canada starting with the Leduc, Alberta field in 1947, and growing imports of cheap foreign oil into eastern Canada drastically affected the demand for Canadian coal. Beginning about 1950, almost all the coal used for heating, industry, and transportation was replaced by petroleum products and natural gas. This had a devastating effect on the coal mining communities of Atlantic Canada, although in western Canada the loss of jobs in the coal industry was more than compensated for by gains in the oil industry.

Coal mining began an expansion phase in the late 1960s with the signing of long-term contracts to supply metallurgical coal to the booming Japanese steel industry. This was of little benefit to Atlantic Canada, but led to the re-opening of closed mines and the development of new mines in Alberta and BC. Around the same time, Alberta and Saskatchewan began to use their substantial coal resources to generate electricity. Crude oil price increases in the 1970s and early 1980s increased the demand for coal worldwide. New mines opened in Alberta and BC, and new port facilities were built in BC to supply the growing demand in Asia.

=== Coal in modern day Canada ===
Canada has the tenth largest coal reserves in the world, an enormous amount considering the sparse population of the country. However, the vast majority of those reserves are located hundreds or thousands of kilometres from the country's industrial centres and seaports, and the effect of high transportation costs is that they remain largely unexploited. As with other natural resources, regulation of coal production is within the exclusive jurisdiction of the provincial governments, and it only enters federal jurisdiction when it is imported or exported from Canada.

Over 90% of Canada's coal reserves and 99% of its production are located in the Western provinces of Alberta, British Columbia, and Saskatchewan. Alberta has 70% of Canada's coal reserves, and 48% of the province is underlain by coal deposits. The Hat Creek deposit in British Columbia has one of the thickest coal deposits in the world, about 550 metres (1,800 ft) thick. There are also smaller, but substantial, coal deposits in Yukon and Northwest Territories and the Arctic Islands, which are even further from markets. The Atlantic provinces of Nova Scotia and New Brunswick have coal deposits that were historically a very important source of energy, and Nova Scotia was once the largest coal producer in Canada, but these deposits are much smaller and much more expensive to produce than the Western coal, so coal production in the Atlantic provinces has virtually ceased. Nova Scotia now imports most of the coal for its power plants from other countries like Colombia. At the same time, the Western provinces export their coal to 20 different countries, particularly Japan, Korea, and China, in addition to using it in their own thermal power plants.

The region between New Brunswick and Saskatchewan, a distance of thousands of kilometres which includes the major industrial centres of Ontario and Quebec, is largely devoid of coal. As a result, these provinces used to import almost all of the coal for their steel mills and thermal power plants from the United States. Unfortunately coal from the Eastern United States is high in sulphur content, and this had contributed to a serious air quality problem, particularly in heavily populated Southwestern Ontario until they phased out the last coal-fired power plant in 2014.

== Petroleum ==
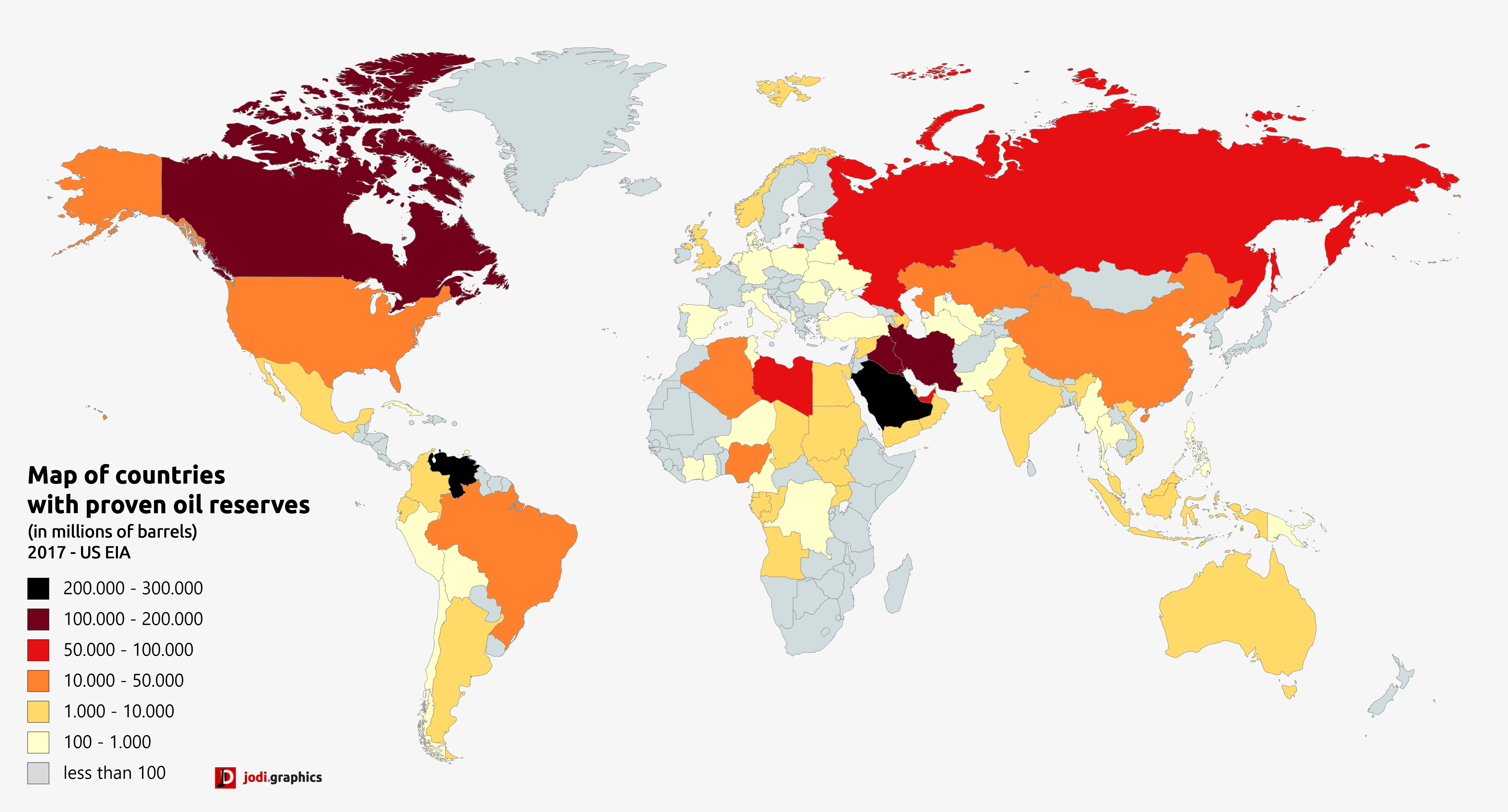
A map of world oil reserves according to U.S. EIA, 2017

=== First fields ===
In 1858 James Miller Williams dug the first oil well in North America at Oil Springs, Ontario, preceding Edwin Drake who drilled the first one in the United States one year later. By 1870 Canada had 100 refineries in operation and was exporting oil to Europe. However, the oil fields of Ontario were shallow and small, and oil production peaked and started to decline around 1900. In contrast, oil production in the United States grew rapidly in the first part of the 20th century after huge discoveries were made in Texas, Oklahoma, California and elsewhere.

=== Turner Valley era ===
In 1914, Turner Valley became the first significant field found in Alberta. Eastern Canadian investors and the federal government showed little interest and the field was developed primarily by subsidiaries of U.S. companies. It was originally believed to be a gas field with a small amount of naptha condensed in the gas, but due to the lack of regulations, about 90% of the gas was flared off to extract the small amount of petroleum liquids, an amount of gas that today would be worth billions of dollars.

In 1930, crude oil was discovered in the Turner Valley field, below and to the west of the gas cap. This came as a shock to geologists because the free gas cap, which could have provided the reservoir drive to produce the oil, had largely been produced and flared off by that time. As a result, less than 12% of the original oil in place at Turner Valley will ever be recovered.

The Alberta provincial government became upset by the conspicuous waste so in 1931 it passed the Oil and Gas Wells Act, followed in 1932 by the Turner Valley Conservation Act. However, the federal government declared both Acts unconstitutional, and the wasteful burning of natural gas continued. However, in 1938 the provincial government established the Alberta Petroleum and Natural Gas Conservation Board (today known as the Energy Resources Conservation Board) to initiate conservation measures, and this time was successful in implementing it.

This body was the regulator of oil and gas production in Alberta, and therefore of most production in Canada. As the provincial regulatory authority with the most experience in the industry, it became a model for the other oil and gas producing provinces - indeed, it has been used as a model by many national petroleum industries around the world.

=== Post-war discoveries and development ===
At the end of World War II, Canada was importing 90% of its oil from the U.S. The situation changed dramatically in 1947 when Imperial Oil drilled into a peculiar anomaly on its newly developed seismic recordings near the then-village of Leduc, Alberta. The Leduc No. 1 well identified a large oil field, and provided the geological key for other important discoveries within Alberta. Geologists soon began to identify and drill other Devonian reefs, mostly in the north-central portion of the province. The Alberta oil rush began, and drillers quickly began to identify other important oil-bearing formations like the one hosting the giant Pembina oilfield.

The Leduc discovery and the string of even bigger ones that followed rapidly backed imported oil out of the Canadian prairies and produced a huge oil surplus which had no immediate market. In 1949, Imperial Oil applied to the federal government to build the Interprovincial Pipeline (IPL) to Lake Superior, and in 1950 it was completed to the port of Superior, Wisconsin. Many people questioned why it was built to an American port rather than a Canadian one, but the federal government was more interested in the fact that oil exports completely erased the country's trade deficit.

In 1950 the federal government approved a western pipeline, and in 1953 the 1,200 km (750 mi) Transmountain Pipeline was built from Edmonton to the port of Vancouver, British Columbia, with an extension to Seattle, Washington. The IPL was extended via Sarnia, Ontario, to Toronto by 1956 and became, at 3,100 km (1,900 mi), the world's longest oil pipeline at that time. Extensions were built to Chicago and other refinery locations in the Midwestern United States during the 1960s, which improved US energy security.

=== National Oil Policy (1964) ===
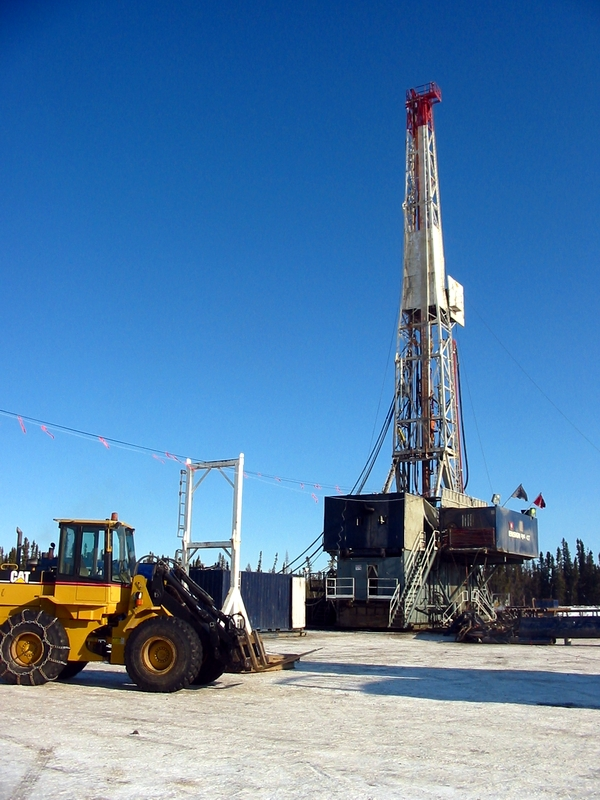
Drilling rig in northern Alberta

Alberta oil producers found that they were receiving better treatment from the US government than from the Canadian government. US energy policy during the Cold War gave preference to Canadian oil and treated Alberta as if it were a US state, as the location of Alberta's vast oil fields made them more secure from attack than the major US oil fields in Alaska, California and Texas. The Alberta producers asked the federal government for exclusive access to the Eastern Canadian oil market, although they calculated that they could not deliver Alberta oil to Montreal for less than the price of imported oil. The Montreal-area refineries and the Quebec government balked at this, resulting in the National Oil Policy of 1961. This drew a dividing line at the Ottawa River and gave Canadian producers exclusive rights to sell oil to the west of the line. Only the refineries east of the line could continue to process imported oil.

Not everyone was happy with the arrangement. The aim of the National Oil Policy was to promote the Alberta oil industry by securing for it a protected share of the domestic market. Under the policy, Canada was divided into two oil markets. The market east of the Ottawa Valley (the Borden Line) would use imported oil, while west of the Borden Line, consumers would use the more expensive Alberta supplies. For most of the 1961–1973 period, consumers to the west paid between $1.00 and $1.50 per barrel above the world price, which, just before the 1973 OPEC oil embargo and price increase, stood at around $3.00. They also paid proportionately higher prices at the pump than Canadians east of the Borden line.

=== Government energy companies ===
In 1970, Quebec created a provincially owned petroleum company called SOQUIP. A year later, the Gordon Commission's nationalist flavour found practical expression with the creation of the Canada Development Corporation, to "buy back" Canadian industries and resources with deals that included a takeover of the Western operations of France's Aquitaine and their conversion into Canterra Energy. Also in 1971, the federal government blocked a proposed purchase of Canadian-controlled Home Oil by American-based Ashland Oil.

The wave of direct action spread to Alberta when Premier Peter Lougheed and his Conservatives won power in 1971, ending 36 years of Social Credit rule. Lougheed's elaborate election platform, titled New Directions, sounded themes common among OPEC countries by pledging to create provincial resources and oil growth companies, collect a greater share of energy revenues, and foster economic diversification to prepare for the day when petroleum reserves ran out. The idea of limited resources emerged from the realm of theory into hard facts of policy when the NEB rejected natural-gas export applications in 1970 and 1971, on grounds that there was no surplus and Canada needed the supplies. The strength of the new conservationist sentiment was underlined when the NEB held its position despite a 1971 declaration by the federal Department of Energy that it thought Canada had a 392-year supply of natural gas and enough oil for 923 years.

=== Energy crises (1973 and 1979) ===
In 1973, this situation changed abruptly.

The Canadian government had already begun to change its energy policy. Inflation had become a national problem and oil prices were rising, and on 4 September 1973 Pierre Trudeau asked the western provinces to agree to a voluntary freeze on oil prices. Nine days later, his government imposed a 40-cent tax on every barrel of exported Canadian oil. The tax equalled the difference between domestic and international oil prices, and the revenues were used to subsidize imports for eastern refiners. At a stroke, Ottawa began subsidizing eastern consumers while reducing the revenues available to producing provinces and the petroleum industry. Alberta premier Peter Lougheed soon announced that his government would revise its royalty policy in favour of a system linked to international oil prices.

Two days later, on 6 October, the Yom Kippur War broke out. OPEC used the conflict to double the posted price for a barrel of Saudi Arabian light oil, to US$5.14. Saudi and the other Arab states then imposed embargoes on countries supporting Israel, and oil prices rose to $12.

These events aggravated tensions among provincial, federal and industry leaders. The rest of the 1970s were marked by rapid-fire, escalating moves and counter-moves by Ottawa, Western provinces and even Newfoundland. The atmosphere was one of urgency, alarm and crisis, with global conflicts adding gravity to the federal-provincial quarrelling.

In 1979–1980, further crises in the Middle East led to panic-driven pricing. The Iranian Revolution came first. War between that country and Iraq soon followed. Oil prices more than doubled, to US$36 per barrel.

=== National Energy Program (1980–1985) ===
Introduced by the Liberal government under Pierre Trudeau on 28 October 1980, the controversial National Energy Program (NEP) had three objectives: energy self-sufficiency; redistributing wealth from a non-sustainable resource to benefit the country as a whole; and increased ownership of the oil industry by Canadians. As implemented, the NEP gave the Federal government control over petroleum prices, imposing a price ceiling and export duties.

The federal government had two major challenges in creating a truly national energy program. The first problem was that Canada is both an importer and an exporter of oil. It imports oil from offshore sources such as Venezuela and the Middle East into its Eastern provinces, while simultaneously exporting oil from its Western provinces into the United States. While it was popular in Eastern and Central Canada, the program incurred strong resentment in the province of Alberta where oil and gas production are concentrated. The second problem was that provincial governments, rather than the federal government, have constitutional jurisdiction over natural resources. The Government of Alberta actually owned most of the oil in Canada. This provoked a confrontation with the government of Alberta, since any reduction in oil prices came directly out of Alberta government revenues. The conflict was made worse by the fact that the Alberta government had constitutional mechanisms available to it by which it could remove oil from federal taxation and shift the costs of oil subsidies onto the federal government. This increased the federal government deficit.

The National Energy Program had a number of other flaws. It was based on a world price steadily increasing to $100 per barrel. The world oil price declined to as little as $10 per barrel in the years following. Since the federal government based its spending on the larger figure, the result was that it spent a great deal of money on subsidies that could not be recovered in taxes on production. Furthermore, due to proximity to the U.S. market companies had opportunities to make money by playing differentials in prices. For instance, refiners in Eastern Canada would import oil subsidized down to half the world price, refine it into products, and export the products to the U.S. at full world price. Airlines flying between Europe and the U.S. via the polar route would take off with as little fuel as possible, and stop briefly in Canada to fill up before continuing on to their destination. Trucking companies operating between locations in the Northern U.S. would detour their trucks through Canada to refuel. None of these transactions was illegal, or even unusual considering the integrated nature of the economies, but all had the effect of transferring billions of Canadian tax dollars to the balance sheets of (mostly foreign owned) companies. A third flaw was that the NEP assumed that future oil discoveries would be made in areas under federal jurisdiction, such as the Arctic and offshore. As it turned out, most of the major oil discoveries in Canada had already been made, and the subsidies given by the federal government to companies exploring in federal jurisdiction were not productive. All of these flaws resulted in large, and unexpected, increases in the federal budget deficit.

The final result of the NEP was that the federal government failed to keep fuel prices low while incurring financial losses. In the subsequent election in 1984, the governing Liberal party was defeated. The winning Progressive Conservative party dismantled the policy a year after its election.

=== Petro-Canada ===
In 1975 the Liberal government reacted to the 1973 oil crisis by creating a federally owned oil company, Petro-Canada. The Crown corporation was originally developed to be an "eye on the petroleum industry" during a period of perceived energy crisis. Initially, its assets consisted only of the federal government's share of the oil sands company Syncrude and the Arctic oil explorer Panarctic Oils.

However, the government quickly expanded it by buying the Canadian assets of foreign-owned oil companies, such as Atlantic Richfield in 1976, Pacific Petroleums in 1979, Petrofina in 1981, the refining and marketing assets of BP in 1983 and of Gulf Oil in 1985.

Federal ownership brought Petro-Canada into conflict with the provincial governments which had control over the largest and lowest cost oil production in the country. They objected to federal intrusion into their constitutional jurisdiction, and tried to block federal incursions. For instance, when Petro-Canada attempted to buy Husky Oil in 1978, the Alberta government surreptitiously got control of Husky stock through Alberta Gas Trunk Line, and successfully blocked the takeover. In 1979 Petro-Canada acquired Westcoast Transmission Co. Ltd. and Pacific Petroleums Ltd., its parent company, as a fully integrated oil company for the then-record purchase price of $1.5 billion.

Petro-Canada overestimated the future price of oil, and consequently paid high prices for the oil assets it acquired, which subsequently fell considerably in value. Its assumption that big new oil discoveries would be made in the Arctic and off the Atlantic coast turned out to be incorrect. Petro-Canada has since abandoned all the wells Panarctic drilled, and the discoveries it did make off the Atlantic coast were fewer, more expensive, and took longer to develop than expected. Hibernia did not produce oil until 1997 and Terra Nova until 2002. The government also expected Petro-Canada to force down what it considered the high price of gasoline to consumers, but Petro-Canada's oil production was more expensive and its oil refineries less efficient than those of the competing multi-national companies, and it found itself losing money on all aspects of the oil industry.

When the Conservatives replaced the Liberals in power in 1984, they began to reverse the nationalization process. In 1991, they passed legislation allowing privatization and began selling shares to the public. The Liberals returned to power in 1993, but had lost interest in having a national oil company, and continued the privatization process. In 1995 the federal government reduced its interest to 20 percent, and in 2004 sold the remaining shares. Petro-Canada has done better since privatization because oil price increases since 2003 make its high-cost production profitable, and consolidation of its refining operations to fewer but larger refineries reduced its downstream costs even as prices increased.

On 23 March 2009, Petro-Canada and Suncor Energy announced they would merge to create Canada's largest oil company. At the time of the announcement, combined market capitalization of the two corporations was $43 billion. The merged organization would operate under the Suncor name, but would use the Petro-Canada brand in its retail operations. The companies estimated that the merger would save $1.3 billion per year in capital and operating costs, and said that the larger company will have the financial resources to move ahead with the most promising oilsands projects.

== Non-conventional oil ==
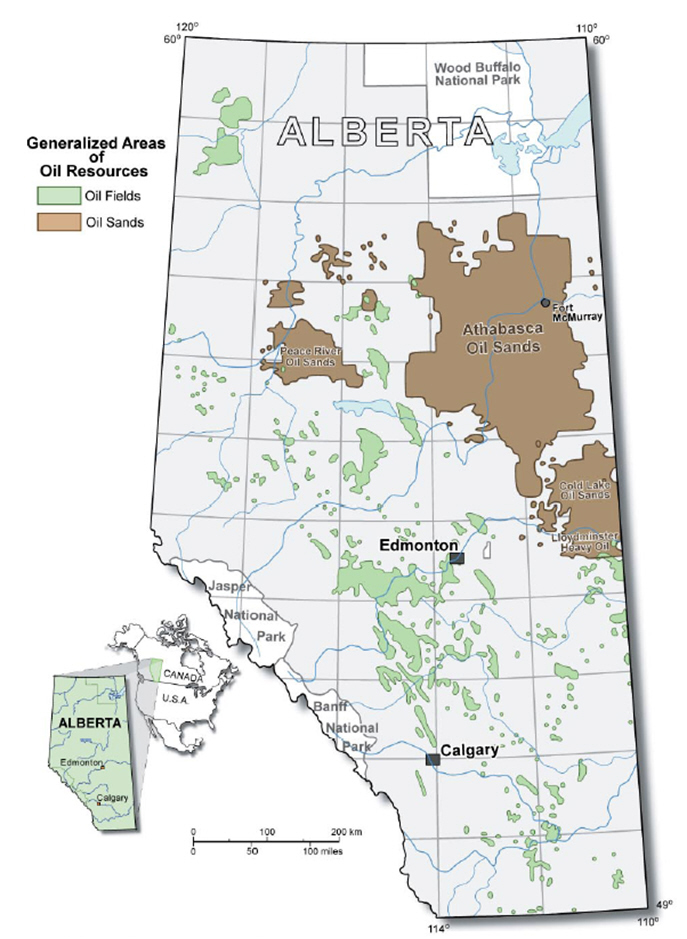
Petroleum resources in Alberta

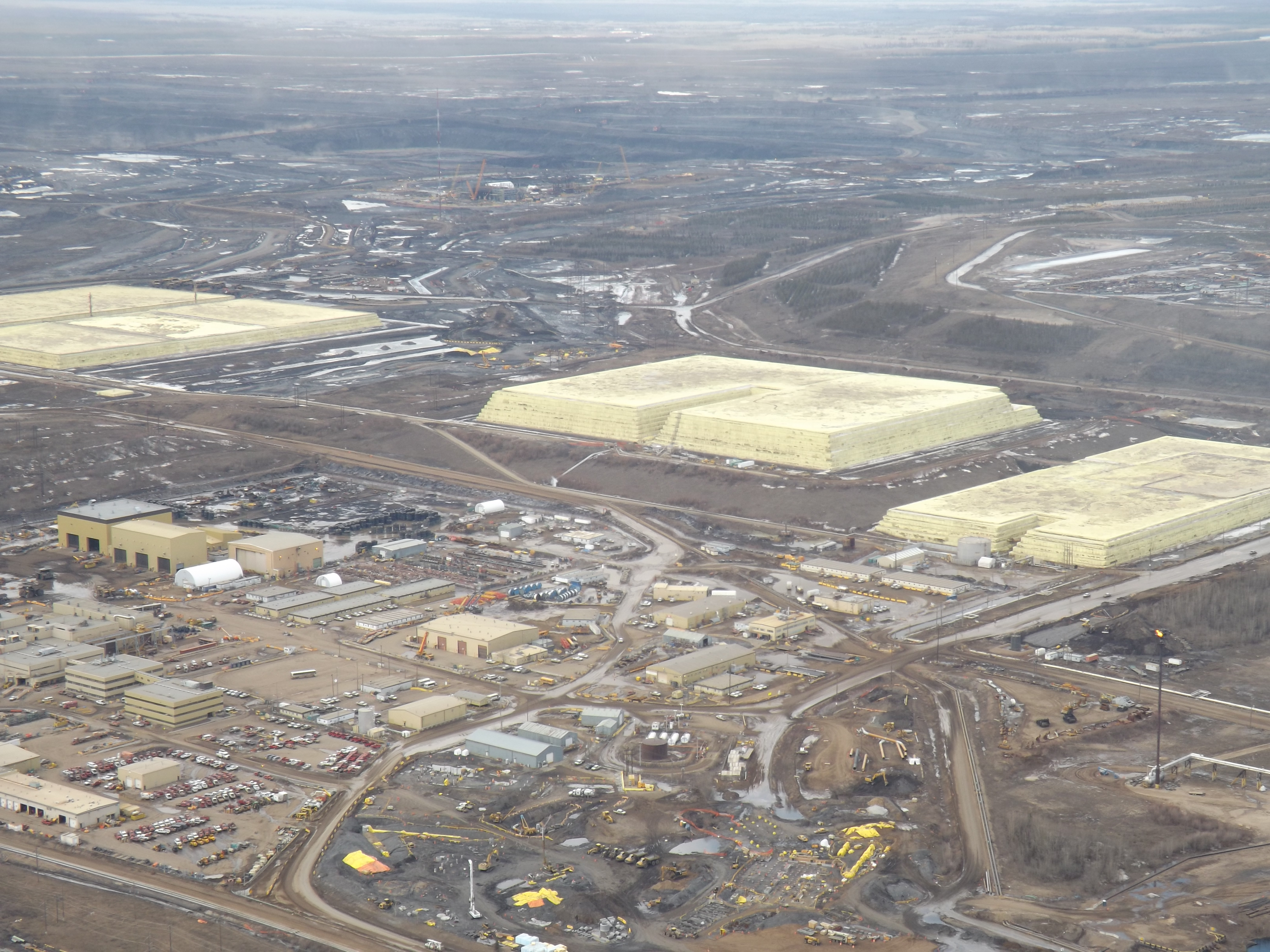
Sulfur blocks at Syncrude base plant

Canada has oil sands deposits greater than the world's total supply of conventional oil at 270 billion m^{3} (1,700 billion bbl) to 400 billion m^{3} (2,500 billion bbl). Of these, 27.8 billion m^{3} (175 billion bbl) are extractable at current prices using current technology, which makes Canada's proven oil reserves second only to Saudi Arabia. Production costs are considerably higher than in the Middle East, but this is offset by the fact that the geological and political risks are much lower than in most major oil-producing areas. Almost all of the Canadian oil sands are located in Alberta. The Athabasca oil sands are the only major oil sands deposits in the world which are shallow enough for surface mining.

Commercial production began in 1967 when Great Canadian Oil Sands (now Suncor) launched the world's first major oil sands mine. Syncrude opened the second major facility in 1978. The third, by Shell Canada, started in 2003. The oil price increases of 2004-2007 made the oil sands much more profitable, and by 2007 over $100 billion worth of new mines and thermal projects were under construction or on the drawing boards. Royal Dutch Shell announced that in 2006 its Canadian oil sands operations were almost twice as profitable on a per-barrel basis as its international conventional oil operations and in July 2007, it announced it would start a massive $27 billion expansion of its oil sands plants in Alberta.

Cost of production in the oil sands, from raw oil sand to fractionate in the pipe feed, was $18 per barrel; now with improvements it is in the 12–15-dollar range. Rapid price increases in recent years have greatly contributed to the profitability of an industry which has traditionally focused on reducing operating costs, and continues to do so. Environmental economists point out that the focus on operating costs does not sufficiently address environmental issues - for example, "ravaged landscapes, despoiled rivers, diseased denizens, and altered atmospheric chemistry."

Oil sands operations differ from conventional oil in that the initial profitability is somewhat lower, but the geological and political risks are low, the reserves are vast, and the expected lifetime of production extends for generations rather than just a few years. Governments have an incentive to subsidize the start-up costs since they will recover their initial subsidies from tax revenues over a long period of time. From the standpoint of federal-provincial revenues, they also differ in that the federal government will receive larger higher share and higher return on its incentives than it would from conventional oil, while the provincial share, although substantial, will be proportionally smaller. Consequently, there has tended to be much less intergovernmental conflict and more agreement on how these projects should be handled.

== Natural gas ==
Countries by natural gas proven reserves (2014), based on data from The World Factbook

=== Albertan natural gas ===
The natural gas industry in Alberta, dating back to 1883, faced political complexities in exporting gas compared to oil. Canadians historically regarded natural gas as a crucial resource, rooted in its importance for space heating. In the late 1940s, Alberta's Conservation Board addressed wasteful production practices, and the Dinning Commission supported prioritizing Albertans for gas supplies. Alberta then passed the Gas Resources Conservation Act, giving control over gas and export permits to the Oil and Gas Conservation Board. The federal government, aligning with Alberta's approach, treated natural gas as a Canadian resource, regulating exports through the Pipe Lines Act in 1949. It wasn't until the Canada-United States Free Trade Agreement in 1988 that natural gas became freely traded between the US and Canada. As of 2016, Alberta, Canada's largest natural gas producer, consumed the most natural gas, attributing 40% to electricity generation.

=== British Columbian natural gas ===
The provincial government has stated "natural gas is a climate solution", under the LiveSmart BC initiative, natural gas furnaces and water heaters receive cash back thereby promoting the burning of fossil fuel in the province. The province states that an important part of new natural gas production will come from the Horn River basin where about 500 million tonnes of CO_{2} will be released into the atmosphere. Natural gas production in BC tripled between 1990 and 2010.

Total BC petroleum and natural gas emissions in 2014 were 50 million tonnes of carbon dioxide equivalent. The city of Vancouver in 2015 issued a report stating that for buildings, natural gas supplied 59% of all energy use, while electricity made up the remainder. BC has committed to reducing greenhouse gases to 33 per cent below 2007 levels by 2020, however the province is far short of that goal, only achieving a 6.5% reduction as of 2015. Although the new John Horgan Dam is expected to have a large initial electricity surplus, the former Liberal government of the province proposed to sell this power rather than using it to cut the 65 million m^{3} (2.3 billion cu ft) per day of natural gas consumption.

== Electricity ==
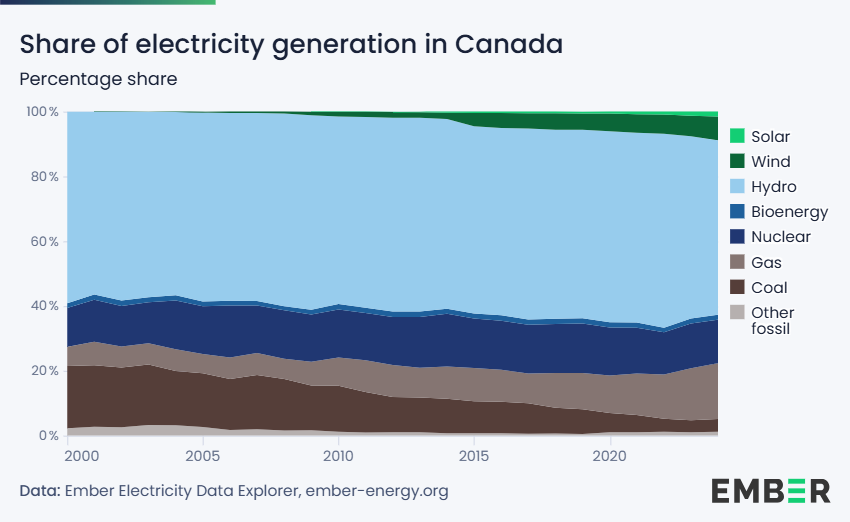
Share of electricity generation in Canada - percentage share

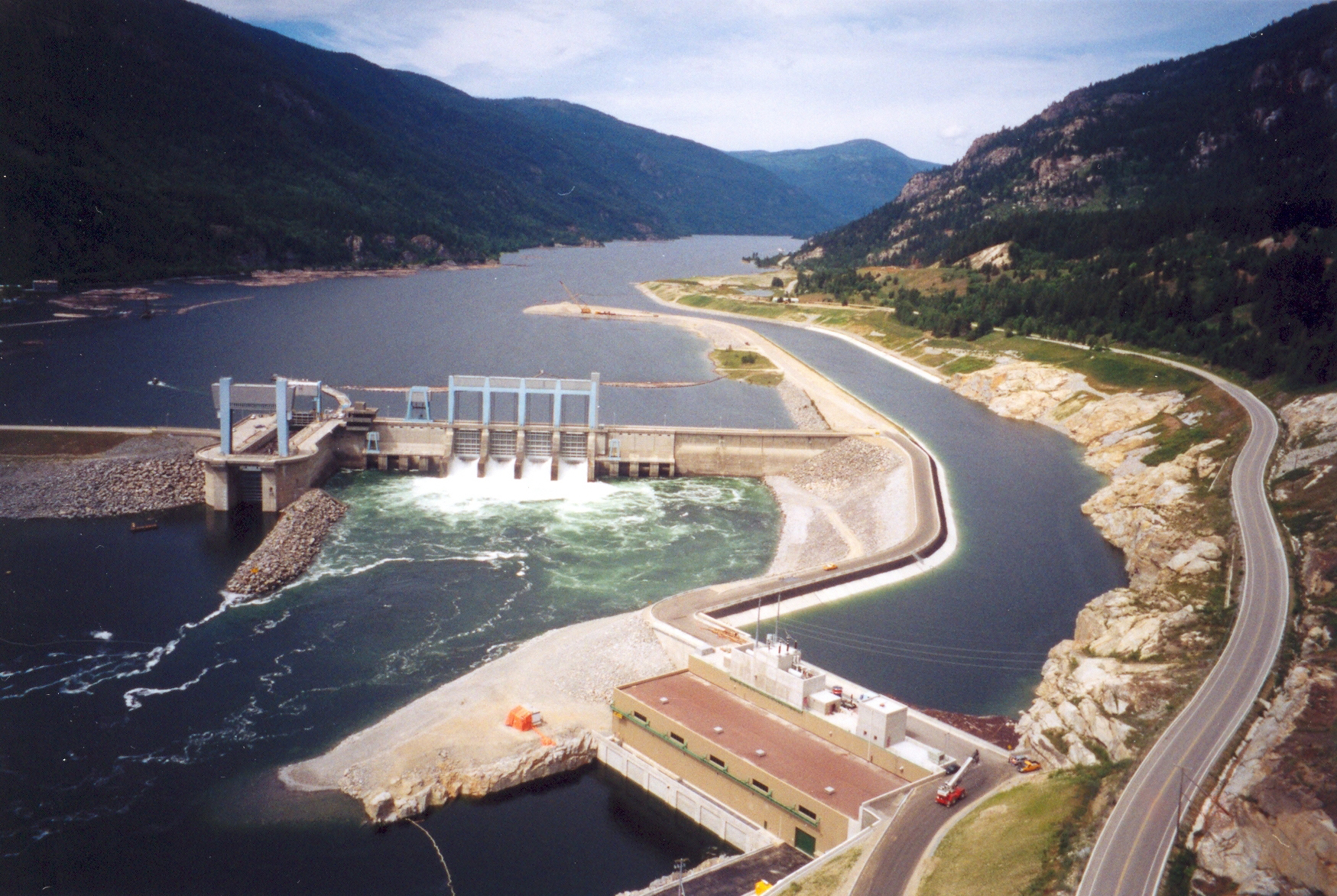
Arrow Lakes hydroelectric dam

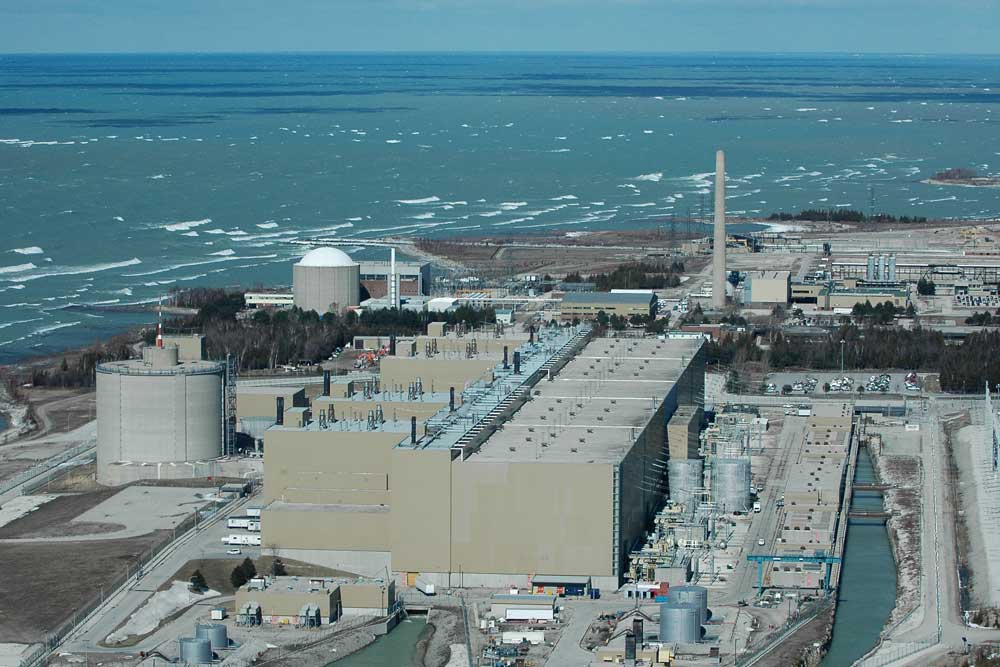
Bruce Nuclear Generating Station near Kincardine, Ontario

=== Early history ===
The use of electricity in Canada began with a few trial installations of electric arc lights in Montreal and Toronto in 1878 and 1879. A permanent arc lighting system was installed in Toronto in 1881 and used to illuminate a number of stores, including Eaton's. In Ottawa, arc lights were installed in several mills. By 1883 arc lights were installed in the streets of Toronto, Montreal and Winnipeg, and by 1890 numerous cities from St. John's, Newfoundland and Labrador to Victoria, British Columbia had arc lighting.

The first successful installations of Thomas Edison's incandescent lighting systems began in Ontario and Quebec starting in 1882. In 1886 a small plant supplying incandescent lights was installed in the Parliament Buildings in Ottawa. These direct current (DC) systems could serve only a radius of 800 metres (2,600 ft) from the power plant. However, in 1888 the first permanent installation of a Westinghouse alternating current (AC) system was installed in Cornwall, Ontario.

The competition between AC and DC came to a head during the development of the potential of Niagara Falls because AC systems could supply electricity over much longer distances than DC systems. This was enormously important to Canada, which had numerous potential hydroelectric sites in remote locations. In 1897 a transmission system was built from the Batiscan River 26 kilometres (16 mi) to Trois-Rivières, Quebec. In 1901 Shawinigan Falls was harnessed, and by 1903 a 50,000-volt power line carried electricity from it to Montreal.

=== Development in Ontario ===
In 1906, influenced by Adam Beck, the Ontario Legislature created the Hydro-Electric Power Commission (HEPC) to build transmissions lines to supply municipal utilities with power generated at Niagara Falls by private companies. In 1910 the HEPC began building 110,000-volt electric power lines to supply electricity to numerous municipalities in southwestern Ontario. In 1922 it started building its own generating stations, and gradually it took over most power generation in Ontario. In 1926 it signed long-term contracts to buy electricity from power companies in Quebec, but these proved controversial when jurisdictional disputes impeded development of the St. Lawrence and Ottawa Rivers and the Great Depression reduced demand. However, during World War II they proved an extremely important source of power for war production.

After WWII, the development of the Saint Lawrence Seaway in conjunction with American power authorities allowed the development of the potential of the St. Lawrence River, and agreements with Quebec allowed Ontario to develop sites on the upper Ottawa River. However, hydroelectric capacity in Ontario was inadequate to meet growing demand, so coal burning power stations were built near Toronto and Windsor in the early 1950s. In the 1960s, Ontario turned to nuclear power. In 1962 the HEPC and Atomic Energy of Canada Limited started operating a 25-megawatt Nuclear Power Demonstrator, and in 1968 they brought the 200-megawatt Douglas Point Nuclear Generating Station into service. This was followed by the Pickering Nuclear Generating Station in 1971, the Bruce Nuclear Generating Station in 1977, and the Darlington Nuclear Generating Station in 1989. In 1974, toward the beginning of this expansion, the HEPC was renamed Ontario Hydro, which had long been its informal name. Eventually, Pickering grew to eight 540 MW nuclear reactors, Bruce to eight 900+ MW reactors, and Darlington to four 935 MW units.

In the 1990s, the enormous debt from building nuclear power stations, combined with lower than expected reliability and life span, became a political issue. The Ontario government decided to open the market to competition. In the meantime, the closure of many of Ontario's nuclear reactors for rehabilitation, combined with increasing demand resulted in a substantial increase in coal-fired power generation, with resulting increases in air pollution levels. In 2003 a new government came into power in Ontario and pledged to phase out coal as a generation source, leaving open the question of how Ontario was to meet future demand.

=== Development in Quebec ===
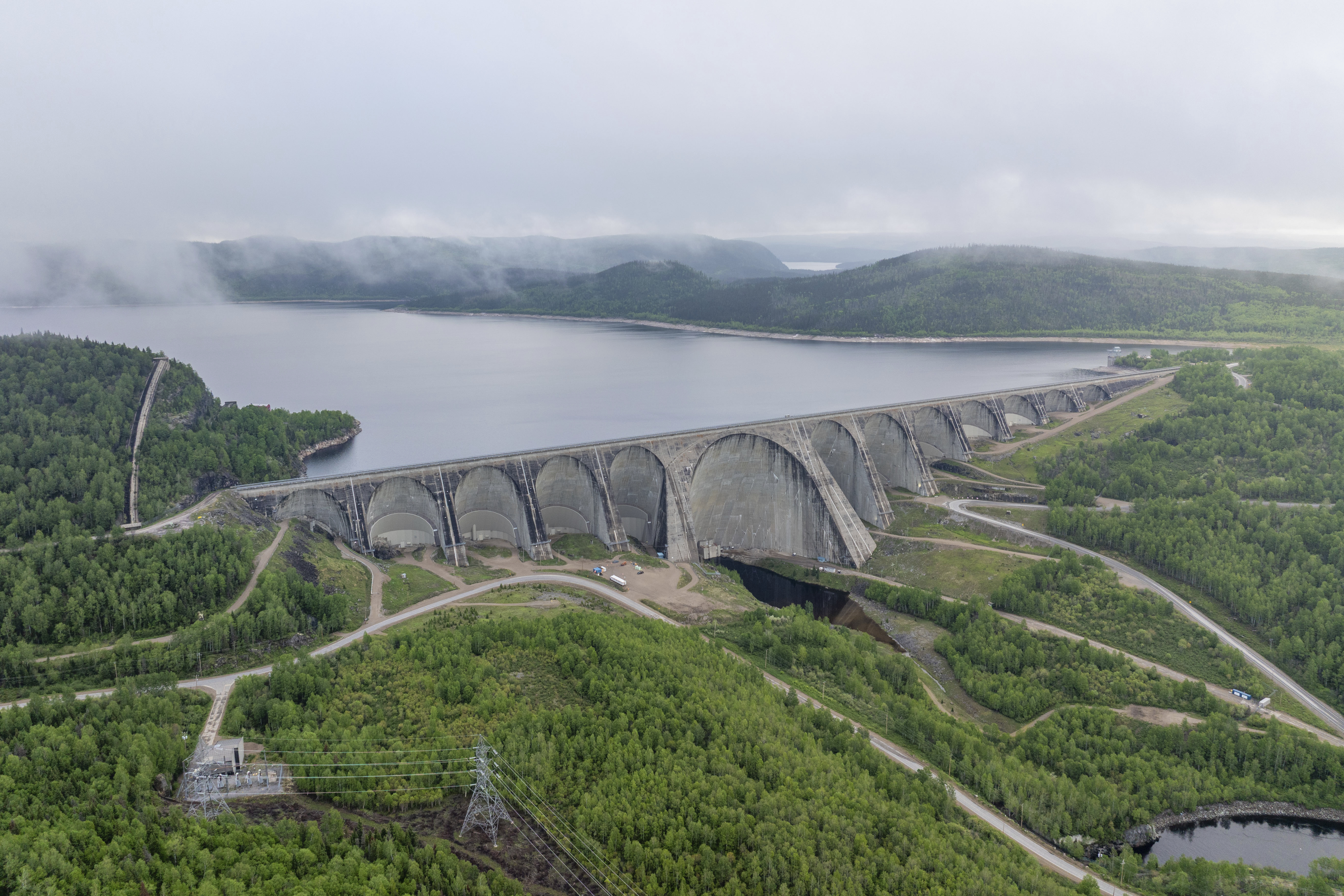
The Daniel-Johnson Dam, on the Manicouagan River, was named after Daniel Johnson, Sr., the Quebec premier who died at the site, on 26 September 1968.

The Quebec government followed the example of Ontario in nationalizing its electrical sector, and in 1944 expropriated the assets of the monopoly Montreal Light, Heat and Power Company to create a new crown corporation called Hydro-Québec. In the post-war era, Hydro-Québec set about expanding and improving the reliability of the electric power grid, and demonstrated it could transmit electricity over long distances at extremely high voltages. Under Maurice Duplessis the Quebec government preferred to leave electrification of rural areas to the Rural Electrification Agency., however after Jean Lesage took power in 1960, Hydro-Québec gained exclusive rights to develop new hydroelectric projects, and in 1963 it began the gradual takeover of all private distributors in the province. Driven by rapidly growing demand, Hydro-Québec built three major hydroelectric complexes in rapid succession: Manicouagan-Outardes on the North Shore of the Saint Lawrence River, and the James Bay Project on La Grande River. This, combined with lower than projected demand, created a surplus of electricity in Quebec, so in 1997, Hydro-Québec began wholesale marketing of electricity to the United States.

=== Development in British Columbia ===
The development of electric power in British Columbia began with the installation of electric lights in Victoria in 1883. Created in 1897, the BC Electric Company built BC's first hydroelectric plant near Victoria the following year, and created subsidiaries to supply electricity to Victoria and Vancouver, the province's two largest cities. BC Electric was taken over by Montreal-based Power Corporation in 1928. Before and during World War II, BC Electric primarily supplied power to the main cities of Vancouver and Victoria, leaving other regions with spotty and unreliable supply. In 1938, the BC government created the British Columbia Utilities Commission, which limited BC Electric's profit margins. In 1945, the provincial government created a crown corporation, the BC Power Commission (BCPC), to acquire small utilities and extended electrification to rural and isolated areas. BCPC grew to supply more than 200 small communities throughout the province.

The American and Canadian governments signed the Columbia River Treaty in 1961 and ratified it in 1964, agreeing to share power from hydroelectric dams on the Columbia River. To enable development of major hydroelectric sites on the Columbia and Peace rivers, the BC government under Premier W. A. C. Bennett bought BC Electric in 1961, and the following year merged it with the BCPC to create the British Columbia Hydro and Power Authority, commonly known as BC Hydro. During the 60s and 70s, BC Hydro built some of the largest hydroelectric projects in the world, notably the W. A. C. Bennett Dam. More than 80% of BC Hydro's electricity is produced by 61 dams at 43 locations on the Columbia and Peace rivers. Since that time the company's developments have been much smaller. During the 1980s BC Hydro changed its focus from building new hydroelectric plants to promoting energy conservation.

In 2010 the province enacted the Clean Energy Act which puts it on a path toward electricity self-sufficiency and energy conservation, while opening the door to energy exports, further investments in clean, renewable energy and a requirement that 93 percent of its electricity must come from clean or renewable sources. After the first application to build the John Horgan Dam was denied by the BC Utilities Commission in 1983, BC Hydro began purchasing from independent power producers which provide 20% of BC Hydro's supply.

=== Development in Alberta ===
With its earliest beginnings in the 1890s, Alberta's electricity system evolved as a combination of a municipally and privately owned and operated systems based on coal-fired generation supplemented with some hydro. Most major municipalities operated municipally owned distribution systems.

As of 2008, Alberta's electricity sector was the most carbon-intensive of all Canadian provinces and territories, with total emissions of 55.9 million tonnes of CO_{2} equivalent in 2008, accounting for 47% of all Canadian emissions in the electricity and heat generation sector.

==== Alberta Power ====
On 19 July 1911, Canadian Western Natural Gas, Light, Heat, and Power Company Limited was incorporated to provide natural gas from near Medicine Hat to other communities in southern Alberta. Electricity was also provided.

In 1954, International Utilities became the corporate owner of Canadian, Northwestern and Canadian Western Utilities. Canadian Utilities purchased the McMurray Light and Power Company Limited and Slave Lake Utilities. Northland Utilities Limited was added in 1961. In the early 1970s, Canadian Utilities became the corporate parent of Canadian Western, Northwestern, Northland, and Alberta Power Limited, which was the electrical operations of Canadian Utilities.

==== Edmonton Power ====
On 23 October 1891 a group of entrepreneurs obtain a 10-year permit to build the Edmonton Electric Lighting and Power Company on the banks of the North Saskatchewan River. The Edmonton Electrical Lighting and Power Company became a municipally owned electric utility in 1902, then the Electrical Distribution and Power Plant departments combined to form Edmonton Power in 1970. Electrical generation capacity was also expanded in 1970 with the coal fired Clover Bar Generating Station construction. Within the next eight years, another three units are added, bringing the combined generating capacity of the Clover bar and Rossdale generating stations to 1050 megawatts by 1979. Expansion occurred again in 1989 with the first Genesee unit is operating at full load and in 1994 with a second Genesee unit to a total capacity of both units to 850 megawatts. Electricity generated at Genesee was made commercially available through the Alberta Interconnected Grid in the early 1990s. EPCOR was formed from the merger of Edmonton's municipal power and water utilities in 1996 and converted into a public company in 2006. Then EPCOR Utilities Inc. spun off its power generation business to create Capital Power Corporation in 2009.

==== Alberta Electrical Distribution System ====
This electrical system changed in 1996, when Alberta began to restructure its electricity market away from traditional regulation to a market-based system. The market now includes a host of buyers and sellers, and an increasingly diverse infrastructure.

Consumers range from residential buyers to larger industrial consumers mining the oil sands, operating pipelines and milling forest products. On the supply side, generators range from wind farms east of Crowsnest Pass to oilsands plants and other petroleum processing facilities which generate marketable electricity surplus to their own needs, to coal-fired plants near Edmonton. Because of lower altitude, cooler temperatures, greater supplies of water for cooling and steam generation, and large near surface supplies of thermal coal, central Alberta is thermodynamically the best place in Alberta to generate hydrocarbon-fuelled electricity.

The diversity of Alberta's electricity supply has increased substantially in recent years. To a large extent because of deregulation, the province has more technology, fuels, locations, ownership, and maintenance diversity than in the past and the rest of Canada. The system's reliability, its cost structure and Alberta's collective exposure to risk are now met by a complex system based on diverse power sources. However, overloaded power lines between northern Alberta and the south of the province are wasting enough electricity to power half the city of Red Deer, Alberta.

== Nuclear power and Uranium ==
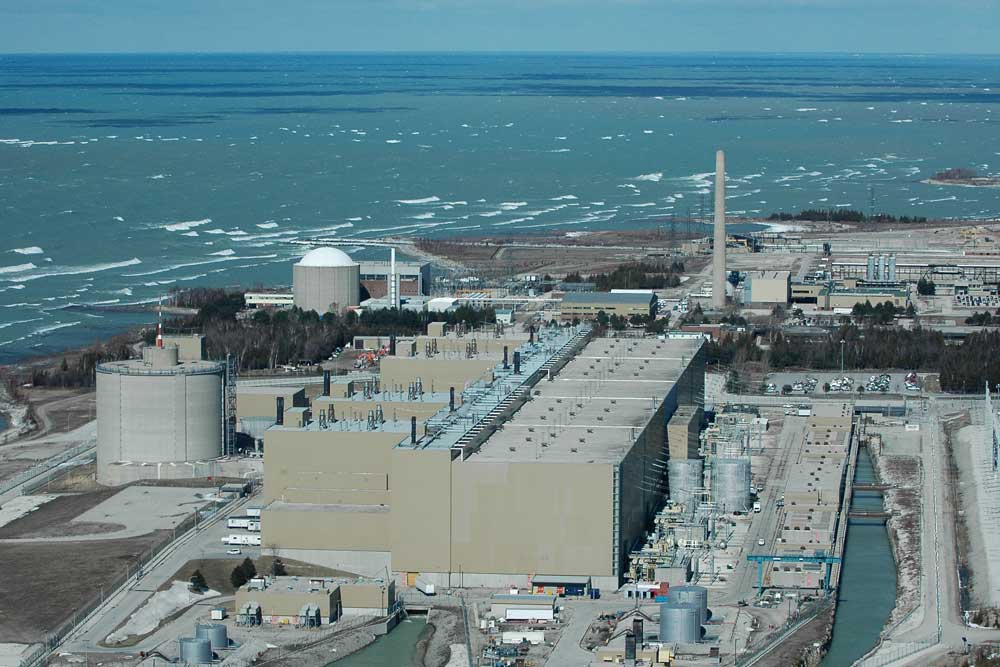
The Bruce Nuclear Generating Station near Kincardine is the world's largest nuclear station with an installed capacity of 7,276 MW (gross).

Canada is a leader in the field of nuclear energy. Nuclear power in Canada is provided by 19 commercial reactors with a net capacity of 13.5 Gigawatts (GWe), producing a total of 95.6 Terawatt-hours (TWh) of electricity, which accounted for 16.6% of the nation's total electric energy generation in 2015. All but one of these reactors are located in Ontario where they produced 61% of the province's electricity in 2016 (91.7 TWh). Seven smaller reactors are used for research and to produce radioactive isotopes for nuclear medicine.

Canadian nuclear reactors are a type of pressurized heavy-water reactor (PHWR) of indigenous design, the CANDU reactor. CANDU reactors have been exported to India, Pakistan, Argentina, South Korea, Romania, and China.

Uranium mining in Canada took off with the Great Bear Lake deposit furnishing some material for the Manhattan Project. Today Cameco and Areva Resources Canada are major produces of uranium for nuclear power. Cameco mines the world's largest high-grade uranium deposit at the McArthur River mine in Northern Saskatchewan.

ZEEP was Canada's first nuclear reactor built in 1945. Canada set up its NRX research reactor at Chalk River Laboratories in 1947. In 1962 the NPD reactor in Rolphton, Ontario was the first prototype power reactor in Canada. From this the NRC and the AECL developed the CANDU reactor. Ontario Hydro's first production power reactor was constructed at the Douglas Point in 1956. Eighteen reactors were then built in the following four decades in Ontario, Quebec and New Brunswick.

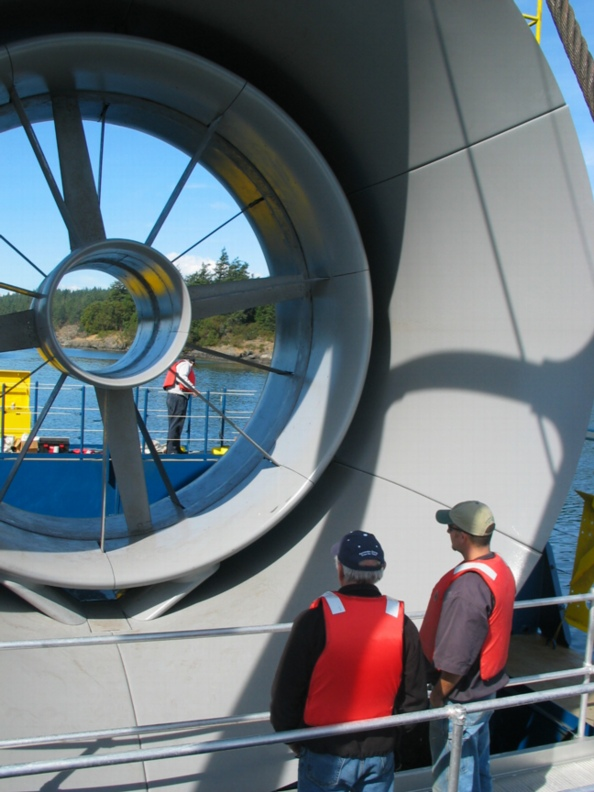
The Race Rocks Tidal Current Generator before installation

== Renewable energy and carbon neutral energy ==
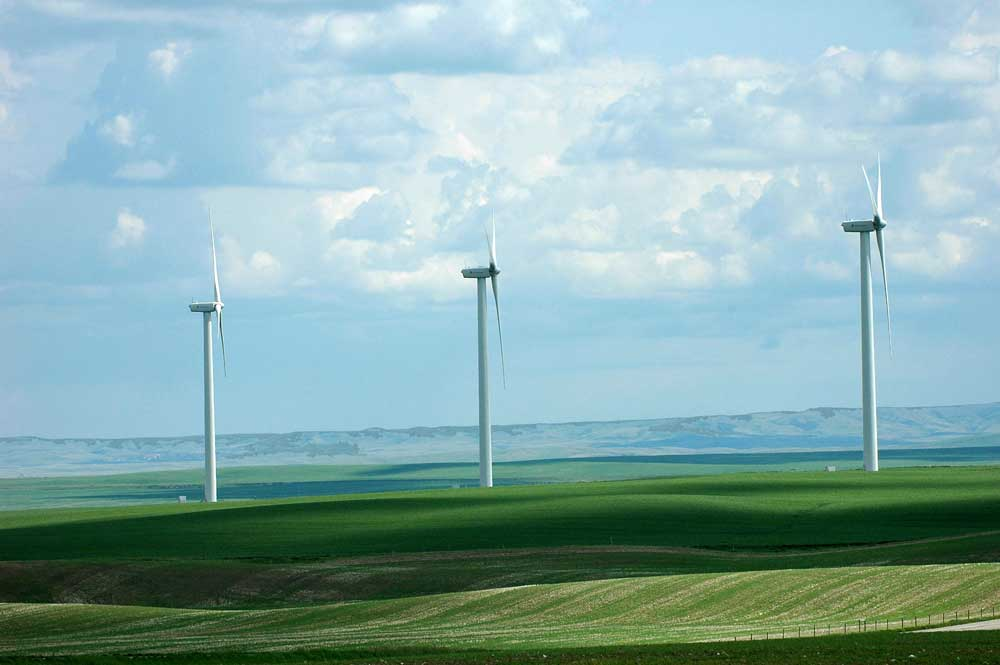

Canada generates a significant part of its electricity from hydroelectric dams, but has otherwise limited renewable energy generation, although wind power is growing quickly. The first commercial wind farm in Canada was built in Alberta in 1993. A 20-megawatt tidal plant sits at Annapolis, Nova Scotia, and uses the daily tides of the Bay of Fundy.

The first commercial solar project was built in Stone Mills, Ontario in 2009.Skypower Ltd, used over 120,000 thin film photovoltaic solar panels, for a total of 9,1 megawatt, creating clean solar energy for 1000 homes annually.

Politicians have been willing to subsidize renewable methods using taxpayer funds to increase the amount and percentage of Canada's electricity generated.

== Energy conservation in Canada ==
After the 1973 Oil Crisis, energy conservation became practical with smaller cars and insulated homes. Appliances were improved to use less energy. In the recent years, this successfully lead to both a reduction in energy use and CO_{2} emissions.

However, the adaptation of new technologies in civil engineering also caused new issues, such as the Urea-formaldehyde insulation disaster and the ongoing Leaky condo crisis.

== See also ==
- Climate change in Canada
- Canada and the Kyoto Protocol
- Renewable energy in Canada
- Electricity policy of Alberta
- Electricity policy of Ontario
- Science and technology in Canada
- Oil megaprojects (2011)
- Petroleum production in Canada
- Coal in Canada
- Electricity sector in Canada
