= George L. McMahon =

Canadian business and sports executive (1904–1978)

- Born: George Levy McMahon; June 18, 1904; Moyie, British Columbia
- Died: July 11, 1974 (aged 70); Calgary, Alberta
- Other name: Mr. Football
- Education: Whitworth College
- Occupation: President of the Calgary Stampeders and Pacific Petroleums Namesake of McMahon Stadium
- Spouses: Helen Galbraith (m. 1937; div. 1945); Katherine Latimer Staples (m. 1946)
- Children: 6

George Levy McMahon (June 18, 1904 – July 11, 1978) was a Canadian oil executive who was president of Pacific Petroleums from 1952 to 1961. He also served as president of the Calgary Stampeders and along with his brother, Frank McMahon, provided funding for the construction of McMahon Stadium.

== Early life ==
McMahon was born on June 18, 1904, to Francis J. and Stella (Soper) McMahon. He grew up in Moyie, British Columbia, and Spokane, Washington, and attended Gonzaga University and Whitworth College. In 1924, he earned a degree in business administration from the latter institution.

From 1924 to 1926, McMahon worked in the metal department of the Consolidated Mining and Smelting Company in Kimberley, British Columbia. He then worked for Pemberton and Son, a stock and bond brokerage based in Vancouver.

== Business ==
McMahon's success as a broker provided much of the money he and his brother needed to start their own oil well drilling business. They entered the oil business in 1930 and in 1939, founded Pacific Petroleum. In 1948, they drilled one of Alberta's first oil wells, Leduc No. 3. They were also among the first to develop the Turner Valley oil fields. In 1949, they started the Westcoast Transmission Company, which constructed the $200-million Westcoast Pipeline. McMahon served as president of Pacific Petroleum from 1952 to 1961. He then served as Pacific's vice chairman until his retirement.

In 1963, McMahon began construction on the Calgary Inn, a 12-story, 319-room hotel. He served as president of Calgary Inn Ltd. until 1968 and the hotel is now the Westin Hotel Calgary.

McMahon also served as a director of the National Trust Company, Phillips Petroleum Company, Canadian Atlantic Oil, Peace River Natural Gas Company, Charter Oil Company, and New Gas Exploration Company of Alberta.

== Calgary Stampeders ==
A longtime director of the Calgary Stampeders, McMahon was elected president of the team in December 1959. Under his leadership, the Stampeders went from a deficit of $2,066 in 1959 to surplus of $233,666 in 1967. In 1960, George and Frank McMahon put up the initial $300,000 towards the construction of a new football stadium in Calgary, which was named in their honor. McMahon stepped down in 1968 due to ill health and was replaced by Pat Mahoney.

== Personal life ==
McMahon was a member of the Canadian Scottish Regiment and served in the 2nd Reserve Battalion of the British Columbia Regiment during World War II. In 1955, he was made an honorary colonel of the South Alberta Light Horse.

McMahon's first marriage ended in divorce in 1945. On March 21, 1946, he married Katherine Latimer Staples. They had three sons and three daughters.

In 1967, illness forced McMahon to live most of the year in The Bahamas. He died on July 11, 1978, at Calgary General Hospital.
