= Moyie =

Moyie may refer to

- Moyie, British Columbia, a town in Canada
- Moyie Springs, Idaho a town in the United States
- Moyie (sternwheeler), an 1898 paddle steamer
- Moyie Lake, a lake in British Columbia
- Moyie River, a river in British Columbia and Idaho
