= NW Innovation Works =

American methanol refinery company

NW Innovation Works (Northwest Innovation Works or NWIW) is an American company proposing methanol refineries in the Pacific Northwest region. The company refers to itself as a clean tech company.

== Company history ==
The company was founded in 2011 by the Pan-Pacific Energy Corp, owned by Shanghai Bi Ke Clean Energy Technology Co., Ltd, the private equity arm of the government-owned Chinese Academy of Sciences, and BP, who later sold their share of the company. Johnson Matthey joined in 2015, and by 2016, a shareholder was Stonepeak Partners, a private equity firm managing over $5 billion in equity in 2016.

The natural gas feedstock, typically produced by fracking and supplied through the Northwest Pipeline, would go through a methane reforming process to produce liquid methane, which would be shipped to Dalian, China for plastics production.

== Proposed facilities ==
=== Tacoma, Washington ===
After lobbying on a 2013 Chinese trade mission by Washington State's governor Jay Inslee, NWIW announced plans to build "the world's largest methanol plant" in Tacoma, Washington, at the site of a former Kaiser Aluminum smelter. The plant was announced in 2014 and canceled in 2016 after protests and lawsuits.

=== Kalama, Washington ===
NWIW announced their planned liquid methanol plant at the Port of Kalama in Kalama, Washington. The company touts this refinery as reducing greenhouse gas emissions by displacing coal plants in China, though the Stockholm Environment Institute and others dispute this, stating greenhouse gas emissions would increase, displacing sources other than coal plants.

The Kalama plant would also use a Zero Liquid Discharge system to prevent waste products from flowing into the Columbia River.

While the plant has been touted as displacing coal-to-plastics processes, OPB obtained documents showing that in 2019 the company said the methanol would be used as fuel in China.

Financing for the plant may be backed with a $2 billion federal loan guarantee, as well as federal and state grants, loans, and tax breaks.

=== Clatskanie, Oregon ===
NWIW also has plans to build a methane reforming facility on the Columbia River at Port Westward industrial park near Clatskanie, Oregon.
