= George McMahon =

George McMahon may refer to:

- George McMahon (actor) (born 1985), Irish actor
- George McMahon (failed assassin) (died 1970), journalist and attempted assassin
- George McMahon (activist) (1950–2019), patient in the Compassionate Investigational New Drug program
- George McMahon (politician) (1929–2019), Canadian politician in Prince Edward Island
- George L. McMahon (1904–1978), Canadian business and sports executive
