= Nicolas Coccola =

French missionary to British Columbia

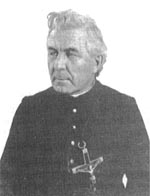
- Father Nicolas Coccola
- Born: December 12, 1854; Corsica, France
- Died: March 1, 1943 (aged 88); Smithers, British Columbia
- Occupation: Oblate missionary
- Parent(s): Jean and Elise di Coccola

Nicolas Coccola (December 12, 1854–March 1, 1943) was a French Oblate missionary in British Columbia, Canada from 1880 until his death in 1943.

He spent 63 years in different regions of the province, working among the Shuswap, Kootenai, Dakelh, Sekani, Gitxsan, Hagwilget, Babine and Lheidli T'enneh First Nations.

== British Columbia ==
Nicholas Coccola left France for British Columbia on June 6, 1880, aboard the SS Gascoigne, arriving in New York City thirteen days later. After taking a train to San Francisco, he boarded a small sidewheel sternwheeler and arrived in New Westminster on July 26.

At the St. Mary's Mission, Coccola continued his studies and on Passion Sunday, 1881, he was ordained a Roman Catholic priest and sent to Kamloops.

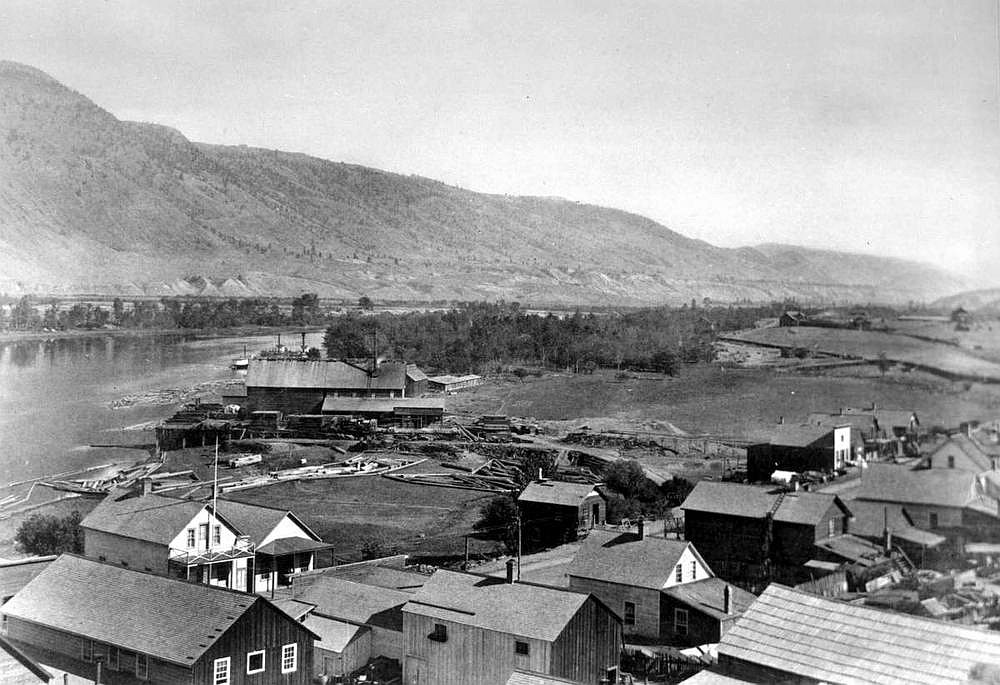
Kamloops in the 1880s

In 1881, Kamloops was a new settlement and consisted of two stores and a like number of hotels. The First Nations camp was three miles (4.8 km) outside of the village on the Thompson River. It had thirty homes, a school and a church. When Coccola arrived he began his service with Father Jean-Marie Lejacq, Father Edward Peytavin and Brother Surel, who all stayed in a 24 x 32 log cabin. Coccola spent much of his time building homes and working in the gardens. His duties often extended to providing medical attention to the local residents, as there was no doctor in the region. On one occasion he was sent with medicine for a son of a Chief in the Nicola Valley and when the man recovered, Coccola was sent on more sick calls to Fountain and Lillooet.

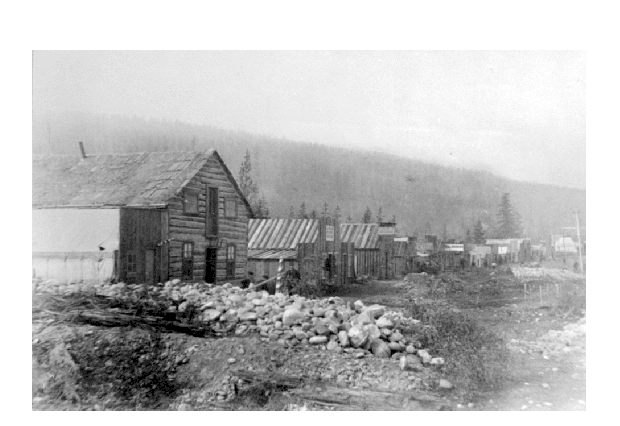
Donald in the 1880s

In August 1883, Coccola and the other missionaries at Kamloops were contacted by Father Albert Lacombe of Alberta with the news that the construction camps of the Canadian Pacific Railway were moving across the Alberta-British Columbia border and that more missionaries were needed to attend to the workers. Nicholas Coccola heeded the call and went to Eagle's Pass and the other advance camps of the railway construction workers. He often stayed in the bunkhouses with the workers, giving communion and instructions and hearing confessions. He went from camp to camp, through to Rogers Pass and in the fall of 1883, arrived in Donald. By then the rails had arrived in town and there was a population of 300 living in tents, boxcars and shacks. Coccola said Mass anywhere he was invited to do so and prepared the children of Donald and nearby Golden for their first Communion. In November 1884, Coccola was at Craigellachie when the last spike of the Canadian Pacific Railway was driven and with rail construction over, he returned to Kamloops.

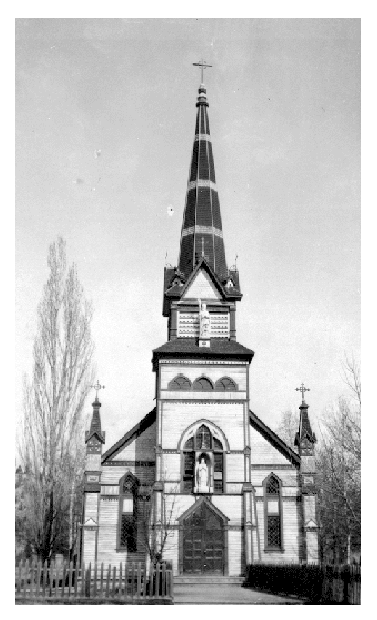
St. Eugene Mission near Cranbrook, British Columbia

=== St. Eugene Mission ===
In the fall of 1887, Nicolas Coccola had just finished serving in Golden when he was transferred to the St. Eugene Mission near Moyie and north of Cranbrook. The mission was 200 miles (320 km) from Golden and river navigation had ended for the year, so Coccola was guided there by a family of Shuswaps.

The St. Eugene Mission had a large garden that provided fresh produce for the residents of the mission and the local miners who were prospecting nearby at Wild Horse and Perry Creeks. There were few white settlers in the area and many had left because they had concerns that the local Kootenai First Nations were going to revolt. Their concerns dated back a few years earlier to 1884 when two Kootenai men had been arrested and charged with murdering two white men. Upon learning that there was no evidence to support the charges, Chief Isador led a band of thirty warriors to Wild Horse Creek and broke the two suspects out of the gaol. When confronted, Chief Isador had defended the action with this statement, "If it can be found that these men are guilty, I will be the first to punish and deliver them. How many Indians have been found killed and white men not arrested?". The Chief then ordered that the judge, the arresting officer and the land surveyor leave the area within twenty-four hours. When Coccola arrived in 1887, the settlers had petitioned the government for protection and North-West Mounted Police (later the Royal Canadian Mounted Police) were established at Galbraith's Ferry, later known as Fort Steele, which was seven miles (11 km) from the St. Eugene Mission.

Coccola's work in the St. Eugene Mission were much like what he had performed in Kamloops and along with his regular duties, his medical services were often required. There were few doctors in the region and influenza was a common ailment. In October, 1890 a residential school was opened at the mission with 20 students in attendance. Coccola often visited and held Mass at Ainsworth, Kaslo and Nelson where churches and hospitals were being built to fill the demands of the rush of settlers caused by railway construction.

In the fall of 1891, two Kootenai women picking berries along the St. Mary's River discovered a large shiny rock. They carried it for a distance and then discarded it upon reaching a good berry patch. The rock was found by Joseph Bourgeois and its discovery was the beginning of the North Star Mine, which would be purchased for by the CPR's Donald Mann for $40,000 the following year.

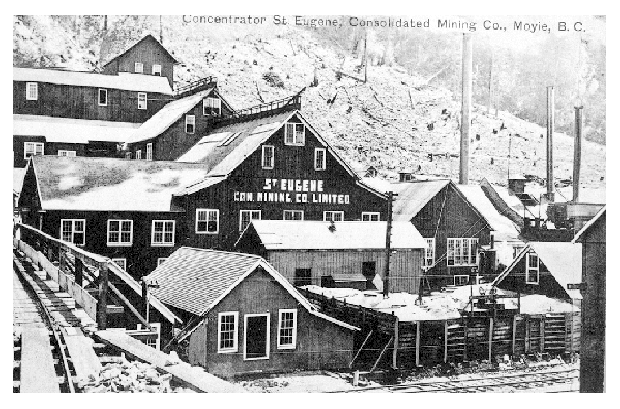
St. Eugene Mining Company in Moyie in 1908

The story prompted Coccola to suggest to the local Kootenai that mining could be profitable for them as well and advised them to keep a lookout for similar stones. In April 1893, Coccola had just returned to the mission when he was approached by a Kootenai man named Pierre or Pielle, who showed him just such a stone and led him to where he had found it near Moyie Lake. Coccola immediately went to Fort Steele and registered for a miner's licence. He sent the samples to Spokane for analysis. Upon learning that the ore contained high percentages of silver, Coccola, Pielle and a Spokane developer by the name of James Cronin each staked a claim above Moyie Lake and registered them in Fort Steele on June 25.

Pielle and Father Coccola both sold their claims in 1895 for $12,000. Father Coccola became known as the "miner priest" and he used the profits to construct a hospital and a new gothic church in the St. Eugene Mission as well as another church in Moyie.

Throughout the next decade the St. Eugene Mine produced more than $10,000,000 in ore and was the catalyst for the Consolidated Mining and Smelting Company, later known as Cominco.

=== Fort George ===
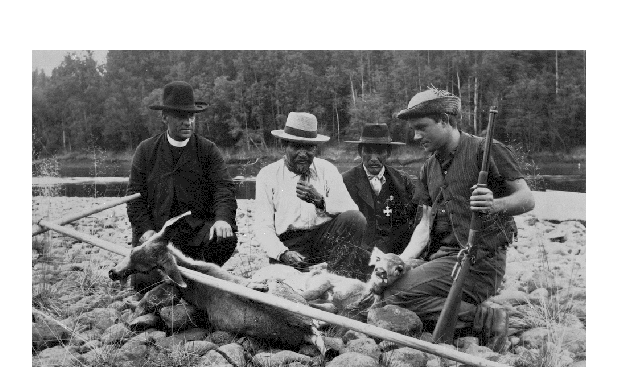
Father Nicolas Coccola with the Chief from Fort George and surveyor Frank Swannell in 1909

By 1911, Nicolas Coccola was visiting the First Nations Lheidli T'enneh village at Fort George, later Prince George, regularly and he began to grow concerned over the bad influences of the railway construction workers and settlers in the nearby townsite of South Fort George, where there was a large licensed hotel. The First Nations village was a valuable property, as it had been decided that the railway was going to pass through Fort George. Several different concerns tried to purchase the property, among them Charles Vance Millar of the BC Express Company. Eventually the railway succeeded in negotiating for the 1,366-acre (5.53 km^{2}) property and with Nicolas Coccola as the band's spokesman, the village was sold for $125,000 and a new reservation was built 16 miles (26 km) north on the Fraser River. By the summer of 1913, the old First Nations village was burned and only the church was left standing.

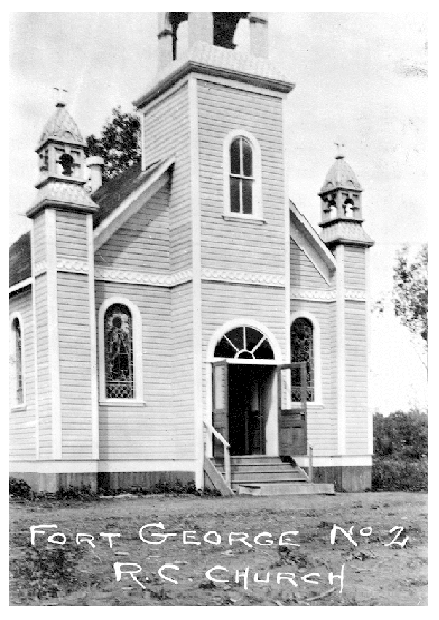
Church at Fort George Reservation No.2 in 1914

On August 31, 1913, Coccola blessed the new reservation and its church. Several townspeople from Fort George arrived in boats to watch the ceremony. He then returned to Fort St. James and Stoney Creek for the winter. In the spring of 1914, he traveled to Smithers where three lots of the new town had been purchased for the construction of a church. He also went to Prince Rupert and inspected the church at Moricetown. In April the construction of the Grand Trunk Pacific was completed, but August brought the outbreak of World War I and Coccola returned to Fort St. James.

By 1917, Prince George, Fort St. James and Hagwilget each had their own priests and Cocola held Mass and served at other towns along the rails such as Vanderhoof and McBride. In the fall of 1918, the Spanish flu epidemic swept the region. In Stoney Creek, one third of the population was lost and at Fort St. James 14 people died and were buried in a single day. Other victims succumbed out in the wilderness at their trap lines and their bodies were never recovered.

=== Lejac Residential School ===
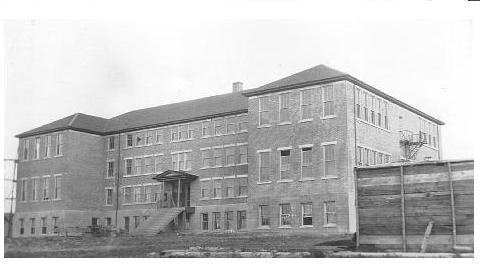
Lejac Residential School at Fraser Lake 1920's

In 1921 construction was begun on a new residential school, this time on Fraser Lake. The Lejac Residential School was completed on January 17, 1922, and the staff and students were moved from the old school at Fort St. James. The same year brought a new St. Joseph's church for Fort Fraser. Coccola was made the principal of the Lejac school that fall and he served there on and off until 1925 when he went to Vancouver for a hernia operation and took some time to visit his old St. Eugene Mission. He returned to the Lejac school and remained there until 1934 when he was made chaplain of Sisters of the Child Jesus Hospital in Smithers.

In 1936, pioneer surveyor, Frank Swannell, suggested that Mount Coccola near Hazelton be named in his honor.

At Easter in 1940, although retired from missionary work, Coccola was summoned to Moricetown as the residents had found themselves without a priest for the holiday and they didn't want to go without Mass and Communion.

After performing his last duties as a missionary, Nicolas Coccola returned to Smithers, where he died on March 1, 1943.
