= Moyie, British Columbia =

- Unincorporated community
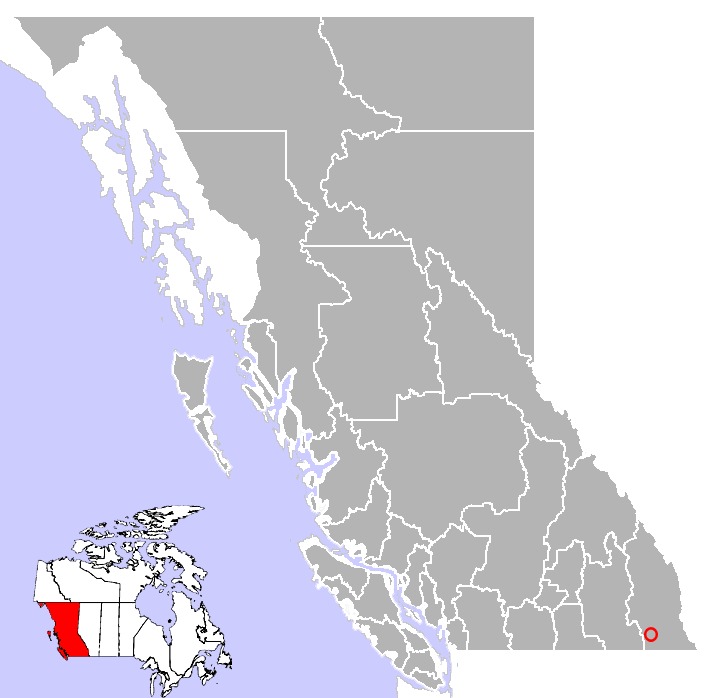
- Location of Moyie in British Columbia
- Coordinates: 49°17′19″N 115°50′0″W
- Country: Canada
- Province: British Columbia
- Regional district: East Kootenay
- Elevation: 1,080 m (3,543 ft)

Population (2006)
  - Total: 450
- Time zone: UTC-6 (CST)
- Postal code: V0B 2A0
- Area code: 250
- Highway: Highway 3
- Waterway: Moyie Lake
- Website: Moyie Lake website

Moyie is an unincorporated community in the East Kootenay region of British Columbia, Canada. It is located on Highway 3, 30 km (19 miles) south of Cranbrook on the eastern shore of Moyie Lake.

Once known as Grande Quete, the origin of Moyie's name is, via the river of the same name, thought to be the French word mouille, meaning wet.

== History ==
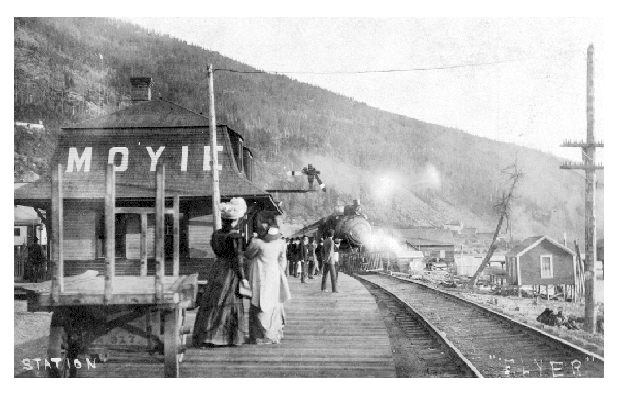
CPR station at Moyie, 1908

Moyie was developed in 1897 by Glencairn Campbell, who purchased the property and subdivided it into lots. Lot sales were brisk as the Canadian Pacific Railway completed a tote road that allowed twice weekly stagecoach service from Fort Steele, while another tote road from Kootenay Lake was completed that November.

It was predicted that Moyie would have a prosperous future and the CPR's new sternwheeler Moyie, launched in 1898, was named for the town.

The first newspaper, the Moyie City Leader was published in the spring of 1898. One of the first stores in Moyie was a meat market owned by Pat Burns, one of a string of such stores that supplied beef to the railway and the residents along the line.

By 1900, Moyie had a population of 600, a train station, a water company and a school with twelve students.

In the 1901 census, Moyie had a thousand residents, predominantly males who lived in boarding houses. Most of the local recreation consisted of what was offered by the lakefront saloons and brothels.

By 1906, Moyie was promoted as "Moyie City" and had five hotels, a lumber mill, a brewery and the St. Peter's church built by Father Nicholas Coccola in 1904.

In 1907 the St. Eugene Mine was described by the Canadian Department of Mines as being "...the most important silver-lead mine in Canada.". By 1909 Moyie had a population of 1,200 with about 450 employed in the mine. However, by 1920, Moyie's glory days had passed and the mine only employed 20 men. The population plummeted to 100 people and Moyie never recovered.

=== St. Eugene Mine ===
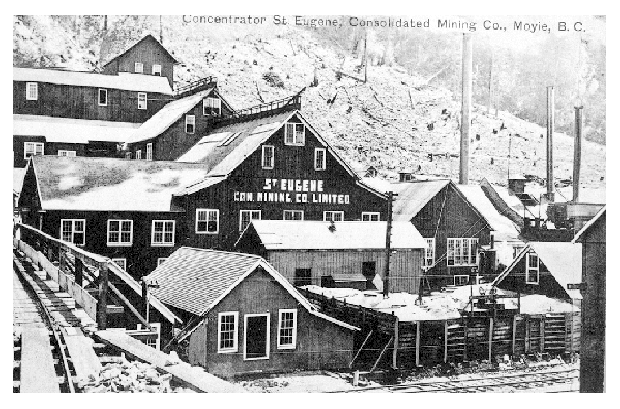
St. Eugene Mining Company in Moyie, 1908

In 1893, rich galena deposits were discovered near Moyie Lake by a Ktunaxa man by the name of Pielle or (Pierre). Pielle took the galena to Father Nicolas Coccola, then head of the St. Eugene Mission, who sent the samples to Spokane for analysis. Upon learning that the ore contained high percentages of silver, Coccola, Pielle and a Spokane developer by the name of James Cronin each staked a claim above Moyie Lake and registered them in Fort Steele on June 25.

Pielle and Father Coccola both sold their claims in 1895 for $12,000. Father Coccola used the profits to construct a hospital and the St. Eugene Church in the St. Eugene Mission. Miners and other fortune seekers began to rush to the area and throughout the next decade the St. Eugene Mine produced more than $10,000,000 in ore and was the catalyst for the Consolidated Mining and Smelting Company, later known as Cominco.

== Attractions ==
Moyie is a retirement community. Restored heritage buildings include the fire station, St. Peter's Catholic Church, and the Kokanee Cove Pub, which was built from parts of the old Manhattan Hotel. All that remains of the St. Eugene Mine are piles of mine tailings and the concrete foundations.

== Media ==
Moyie was featured on the historical television series Gold Trails and Ghost Towns.

== Notable people ==
- Frank McMahon (1902-1986), oil tycoon and founder of both Pacific Petroleums and the Westcoast Transmission Company, known for opening much of northwest Canada’s wilderness
