= Northwest Pipeline =

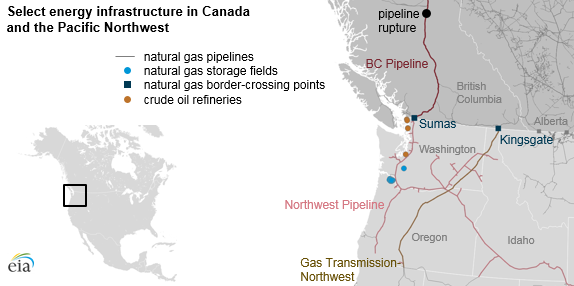
Selected energy infrastructure in the northwest. The Northwest Pipeline is shown in light red.

Northwest Pipeline is a natural gas pipeline network which takes gas from western Canada and the Rocky Mountains via the Westcoast Pipeline and brings it into California, either through Gas Transmission Northwest or Kern River. A small amount of gas goes through the San Juan Basin to El Paso Natural Gas. It is owned by the Williams Companies. Its FERC code is 37.

Consisting of over 3,900 miles of bi-directional pipeline with 41 compressor stations, it is capable of a peak capacity of 3.8 million dekatherms per day.

Klickitat Public Utility District sells landfill gas to Puget Sound Energy that is transported through the Northwest Pipeline.

Northwest Pipeline gathers from the Rockies and Canada. Its primary market is the Northwestern states. Its biggest market is the greater Seattle area.
