= Westcoast Pipeline =

Natural gas pipeline in British Columbia, Canada

Westcoast Pipeline System

Location
- Country: Canada
- Province: Alberta; British Columbia
- Start: Muskwa, British Columbia
- To: Abbotsford, British Columbia

General information
- Type: Natural gas
- Status: Operational
- Owner: Enbridge
- Operator: Westcoast Energy
- Commissioned: 1957

Technical information
- Length: 2,953 km (1,835 mi)
- Maximum discharge: 3.6 billion cubic feet per day
- No. of compressor stations: 14

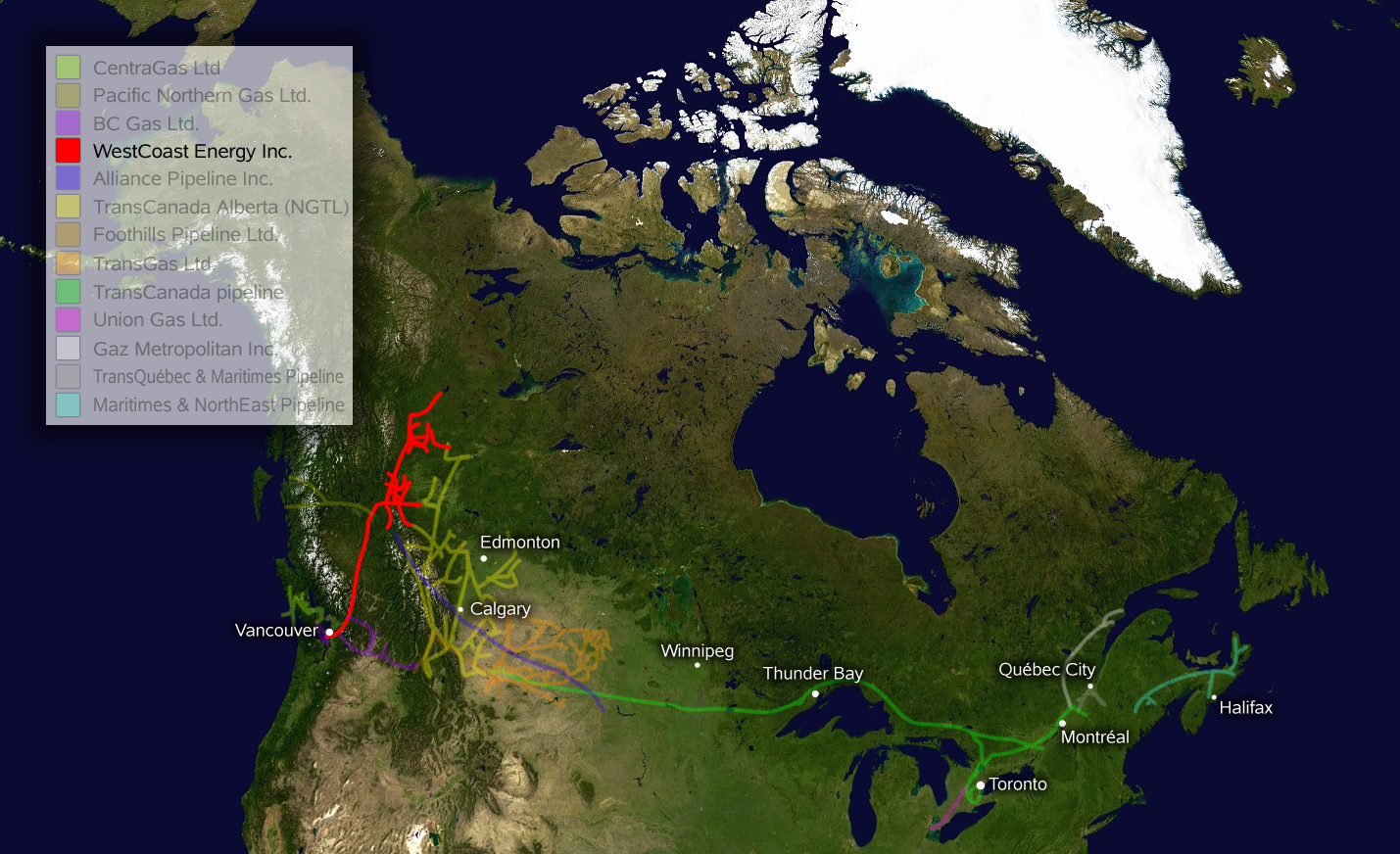

The Westcoast Pipeline, also known as the Westcoast Transmission System or the BC Pipeline, is a natural gas pipeline in British Columbia that brings natural gas from the Western Canadian Sedimentary Basin south to the province's heavily populated Lower Mainland (which includes Vancouver). It connects to the Northwest Pipeline in the United States and east to TransCanada pipeline. Built in 1957 by Frank McMahon's Westcoast Transmission Co. Ltd., the 650-mile gas pipeline from Taylor in north-eastern British Columbia to the United States was Canada's first "big-inch" pipeline.

From 2002 to 2007, it was owned by Duke Energy of Charlotte, North Carolina. In 2007, Duke's natural gas business was spun off as Spectra Energy, which merged with Enbridge in 2017.

The pipeline experienced an explosion in Shelley, British Columbia, near Prince George, on October 9, 2018. The explosion forced about 100 members of the Lheidli T'enneh Band to evacuate their homes. Although nobody was hurt in the explosion, and no property was damaged apart from the pipeline itself, the explosion led to shortages of natural gas in British Columbia. In 2019, the affected First Nation filed a lawsuit seeking a permanent injunction which would prevent Enbridge from operating the pipeline in their territory and reserves, and require the company to dismantle the pipeline and restore the affected lands to their natural state.

Enbridge has proposed a "reliability and expansion program" which would entail replacing old compressor stations, adding an additional compressor station, and other maintenance activities. This project would increase the pipeline's capacity by 190 million cubic feet (5.4 million cubic metres) per day, and is expected to be completed in late 2021.

== See also ==
- Westcoast Transmission Co.
- List of North American natural gas pipelines
