= Walter J. Levy =

German-American lawyer and expert on oil issues

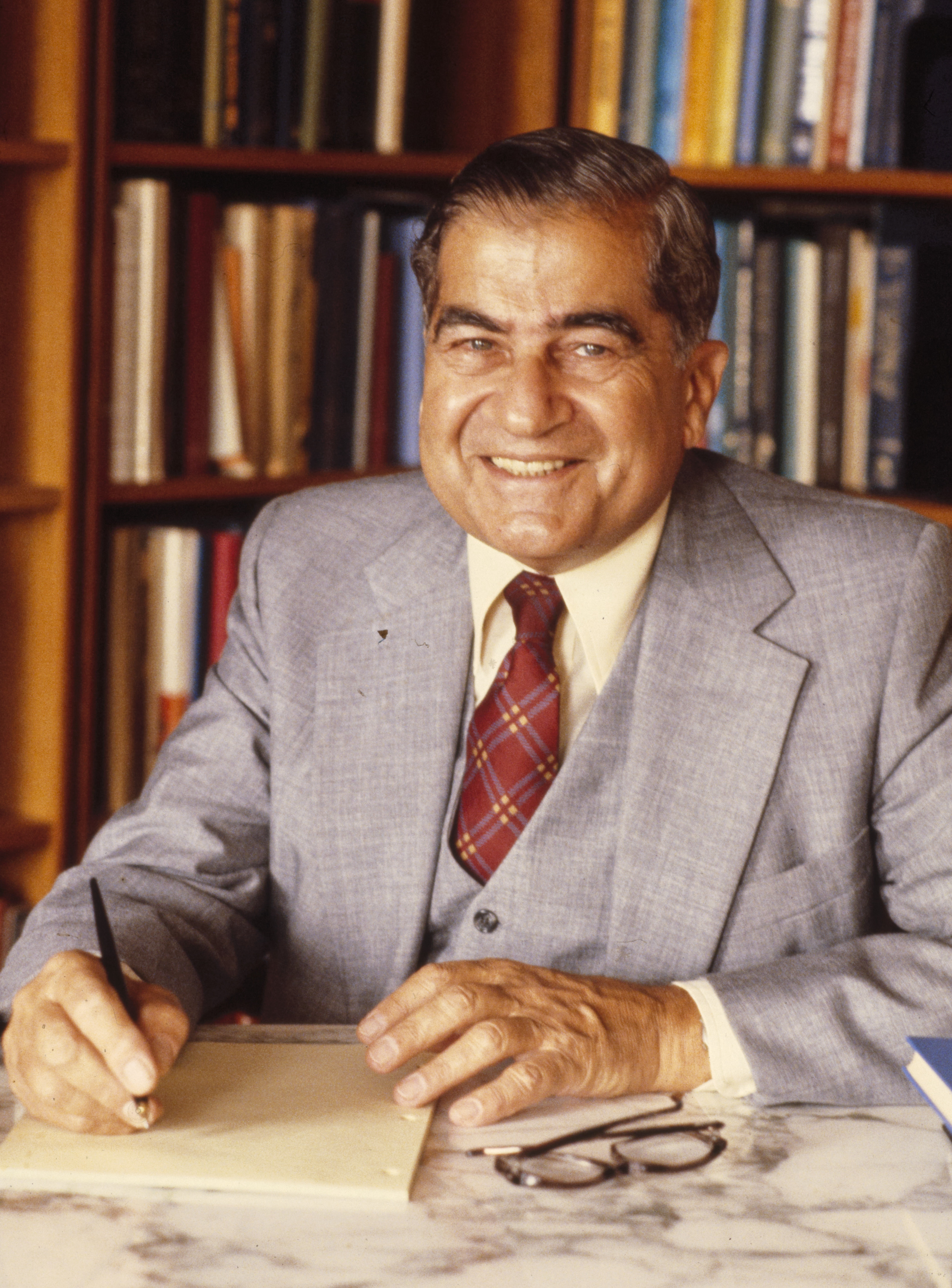
Walter J. Levy (1979)

Walter James Levy (21 March 1911, Altona – 10 December 1997 in New York City) was a German-American lawyer and expert on oil issues. He advised numerous companies and governments.

== Family ==
Walter was the son of the Jewish couple Moses Levi and Betty Lindenberger; he had two older and one younger sister. His father worked as a lawyer and died in March 1938. His sisters survived the Holocaust; his mother was deported to the Auschwitz death camp in July 1942.

Walter J. Levy was married to Augusta (1918–1981), née Sondheimer, as of April 1942. The couple had two children, Robert Allen and Susan Clementine.

== Studies ==
Levy studied economics and law at the University of Freiburg, the Ludwig-Maximilians-Universität München, Heidelberg University (1929–1930), the Friedrich Wilhelm University of Berlin (1930–1931), and Kiel University (1931–1932). At Kiel University, he was awarded a doctorate in law in 1933.

== Exile in Great Britain ==
As a result of the Nazi seizure of power and the ensuing anti-Semitic laws and measures, Levy went into exile in Britain in 1933. He found employment with the Petroleum Press Bureau, which began publishing the Petroleum Press Service in 1934, a multilingual trade journal. Levy took up the study of statistics and wrote a book on oil in war, which attracted the attention of British economic officials, whom he subsequently provided with specialized information. After the start of World War II, he initially worked for the British Minister of Economic Warfare, but was then interned as an Enemy alien.

== Oil expert in the USA ==
Levy emigrated to the United States in 1941 and settled in New York City. There he first worked as a petroleum journalist for Fortune. From 1942, at the request of William J. Donovan, he was an employee of the Office of Strategic Services in Washington, D.C. There, as a section chief in the Enemy Oil Committee, he was particularly concerned with German petroleum deposits, oil supply routes, refineries, and plants for the synthetic production of fuel (→ coal liquefaction) in order to identify targets for air attack. Studying reports of altered freight rates in publicly available German railroad journals helped him encircle appropriate targets. He was subsequently responsible for petroleum research at the U.S. State Department before moving to the Economic Cooperation Administration, which administered Marshall Plan funds.

Levy founded the consulting firm W. J. Levy Consultants Corp. in New York in 1949. His clients included oil industry companies and numerous governments, government officials, and agencies, including those in the United States, Venezuela, and Canada, India, Brunei, and Saudi Arabia. European governments also drew on his expertise, such as those of the United Kingdom and the Federal Republic of Germany. The United Nations and the European Economic Community were also among his clients. His consulting work involved conflict mediation, the formulation of national oil policies, or questions about the future of the international oil market.

He retired in the mid-1980s.

== Works, media appearances and reception ==
He published his most extensive monograph in 1982, covering oil strategies and oil policy. He also published a number of essays, notably in Foreign Affairs. He was also a guest on well-known programs and broadcasters, such as Meet the Press (1973, 1979 and 1980), This Week with David Brinkley (1982), and the BBC (1980).

1977, Time called him "an eminent international petroleum consultant". The New York Times called him the "dean of oil consultants" in 1969, and "the dean of United States oil economists" in its 1997 obituary. The Times characterized him and his company in 1967 as follows: "The consultancy, run by Levy – a man of enormous energy – from New York, is one of the leading, if not the leading, petroleum consultants in the world. Ranging over the whole world, he is said to have instant access to the presidential ears of the major companies and the highest circles in the oil governments."

== Honors ==
- In 1947, he was awarded the President's Certificate of Merit for his service in World War II.
- In 1968, he was presented with the Special Plaque from the U.S. Department of State.
- The Sultan of Brunei recognized Levy's service with the Dato Seri Laila Jasa in 1969.
- In 1969, he received the Order of the Taj of Iran.
- British Foreign Secretary Alec Douglas-Home awarded him the Order of St Michael and St George (C.M.G.) in 1973.
- In 1979, the Federal Republic of Germany honored him with the Great Cross of Merit.

== Archival material ==
Legacies of Levy's consulting work are archived as the Walter J. Levy Papers, 1911–1998 in the American Heritage Center at the University of Wyoming.

== Literature ==
- Levy, Walter James. In: Werner Röder, Herbert A. Strauss, Dieter Marc Schneider, Louise Forsyth: Biographisches Handbuch der deutschsprachigen Emigration nach 1933–1945. Vol. 1: Politik, Wirtschaft, Öffentliches Leben. De Gruyter, Berlin 1980, p. 439, ISBN 3-598-10088-4.
