= Moyie Lake =

Lake in British Columbia, Canada

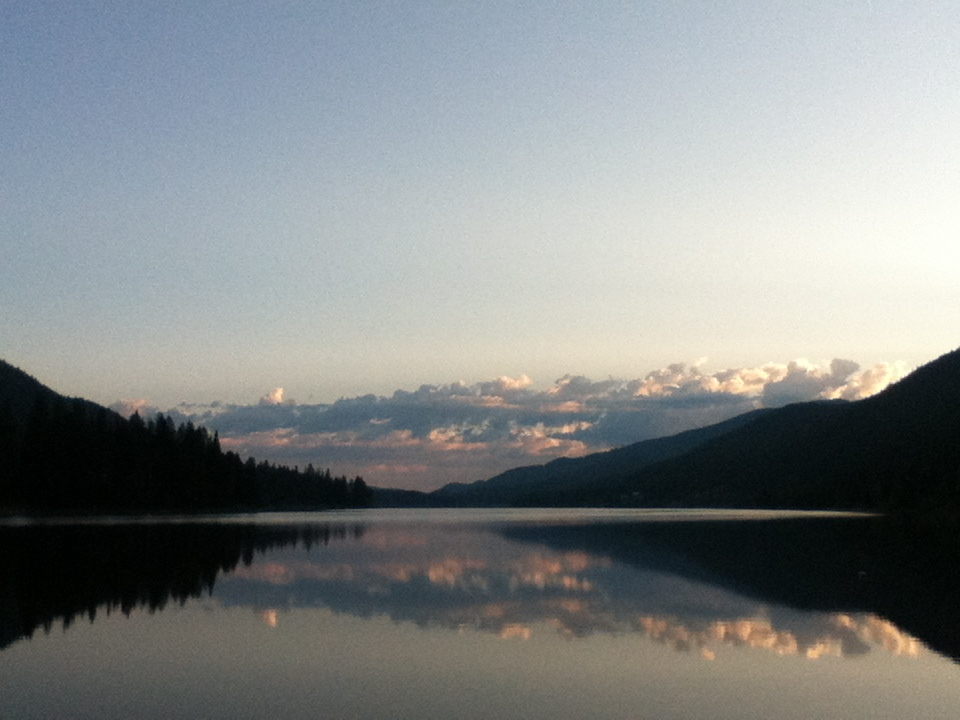
- Moyie lake at twilight

- Location within British Columbia
- Location: southern British Columbia
- Coordinates: 49.347°N 115.833°W
- Primary inflows: Moyie River
- Primary outflows: Moyie River
- Basin countries: Canada

Moyie Lake is a small, narrow kettle lake in southern British Columbia, located along the Moyie River. While building the Crowsnest Pass Railroad, this was the hardest part to build the tracks. The walls of the land around it are very steep and short. It is a lot like Swan Lake to the south in Montana. The lake is located between Cranbrook and Creston. The small town of Moyie is located at the south end of the lake.

Located 20 kilometres south of Cranbrook off Highway 3, Moyie Lake Provincial Park day-use area, boat launch, and 111 site campground provides the only public access to the deep blue mountain waters of Moyie Lake.

== See also ==
- List of lakes of British Columbia
