= Pacific Petroleums =

Canadian petroleum company (1939–1979)

Pacific Petroleums Limited
- Industry: Petroleum
- Founded: 1939
- Defunct: 1979
- Fate: Acquired by Petro-Canada
- Headquarters: Pacific 66 Plaza, 700 6 Ave SW, Calgary, Alberta

Pacific Petroleums Limited was a Canadian integrated petroleum company that existed between 1939 and 1979. The company was founded and built by Frank McMahon, a wildcat driller from British Columbia. Pacific was also the largest shareholder of McMahon's other main venture, Westcoast Transmission. Until 1958 the company operated at an annual loss, but from that time on was one of the most profitable oil companies in the country. In 1960, Phillips Petroleum became Pacific's largest shareholder with a 39 per cent stake, and Pacific began selling retail gasoline under the "66" brand. Between 1978 and 1979, the crown corporation Petro-Canada purchased Pacific for $1.5 billion in what was then the most expensive corporate takeover in Canadian history.

== History ==
Pacific Petroleums Limited was formed as a merger of two companies: West Turner Petroleums and British Pacific Oils, both of which had been founded by Frank McMahon. The vote to merge took place on Saturday, 14 January 1939 in Vancouver. McMahon stayed with the company until 1941, when he left to form several other oil companies. He returned in 1948 and launched a major gas exploration programme.

== Leadership ==
=== President ===
1. Norman R. Whittall, 1939–1948
2. Frank M. McMahon, 1948–1952
3. George L. McMahon, 1952–1961
4. John Getgood, 1961–1964
5. Kelly H. Gibson, 1964–1970
6. L. Merrill Rasmussen, 1970–1979

=== Chairman of the Board ===
1. Norman R. Whittall, 1948–1952
2. Frank M. McMahon, 1952–19??
