= Westcoast Transmission Company =

Canadian pipeline company

Westcoast Transmission Company Limited
- Industry: Pipeline transport
- Founded: 30 April 1949
- Headquarters: Westcoast Building, Vancouver, British Columbia
- Parent: Duke Energy (2002–2007); Spectra Energy (2007–2017); Enbridge (2017–present)

Westcoast Energy Inc. is a Canadian natural gas pipeline company that has been in operation since 1949. The company was founded as the Westcoast Transmission Company Limited by Frank McMahon as a sister company to his main operation, Pacific Petroleums. In 1988 it was renamed Westcoast Energy. In 2002, the company was acquired by Duke Energy, and in 2007 was taken over by Duke's spinoff company Spectra Energy. In 2017, Spectra was acquired by Enbridge, and since that time Westcoast has remained a subsidiary of the latter.

== History ==
In 1949, through a special Act of the Parliament of Canada, he incorporated Westcoast Transmission Co. Ltd. whose business plan included the construction of a 650-mile gas pipeline from Taylor in north-eastern British Columbia to the United States. McMahon personally began lobbying the Canadian and American governments to remove their restrictions on the export and import of natural gas. After exhaustive efforts he succeeded and in 1955 construction began on the Westcoast Pipeline, Canada's first "big-inch" pipeline. Along with its gathering system, processing plants and compressor stations were completed in the fall of 1957. In 1964, Westcoast Transmission built another processing plant at Fort Nelson, British Columbia in support of an additional 250-mile line to the company's new discoveries in the Canadian Northwest. In 1974, Westcoast Tramsmission created Foothills Pipeline Ltd., a subsidiary company established to build and operate the Canadian portions of the Alaska Natural Gas Transportation System.

Westcoast sold the company's natural gas distribution subsidiary, Centra Gas Manitoba, to Manitoba Hydro in 1999.

After McMahon's death in 1986, Westcoast Transmission Co. Ltd. was renamed Westcoast Energy Inc., and in 2002 Duke Energy of Charlotte, North Carolina, acquired the company in a deal worth US$3.5 billion. The natural gas pipeline business was later spun off as part of Spectra Energy, which merged with Enbridge in 2017.

== Company histories ==
- Gray, Earle. Wildcatters: The Story of Pacific Petroleums and Westcoast Transmission. Cannon Books, 1983.
- Newman, Peter C. Continental Reach: The Westcoast Energy Story. Douglas & McIntyre, 2002.
