= Sunshine Millions Filly & Mare Turf =

The Sunshine Millions Filly & Mare Turf is a race for thoroughbred horses held in January at Santa Anita Park in Arcadia, California or at Gulfstream Park in Hallandale Beach, Florida. Half the eight races of the Sunshine Millions are run at one track and half at the other.

Open to four-year-olds and older fillies and mares willing to race one and one/eighth miles on the turf, the Filly & Mare Turf is an ungraded stakes event but currently carries a purse of $150,000. This race is also known as the Warren's Thoroughbred Filly & Mare Turf (in 2006) as part of the eight-race Sunshine Millions series.

In its 16th running in 2017, the series of races called the Sunshine Millions are restricted to horses bred either in Florida or in California and is the brainchild of the Thoroughbred Owners of California, the California Thoroughbred Breeders Association, the Florida Thoroughbred Breeders’ and Owners’ Association, Inc., Santa Anita Park, Gulfstream Park, and Magna Entertainment Corporation.

== Past winners ==
- 2022 - Lovely Luvy (Junior Alvarado)
- 2020 - Starship Jubilee (Fla-bred) (Javier Castellano)
- 2019 - Starship Jubilee (Fla-bred) (Javier Castellano)
- 2018 - Starship Jubilee (Fla-bred) (Jose Lezcano)
- 2017 - Family Meeting (Jose Lezcano)
- 2016 - Lori's Store (John R. Velazquez)
- 2015 - Pink Poppy (Fla-bred) (Julien Leparoux)
- 2014 - Parranda (Fla-bred) (Jose Lezcano)
- 2013 - Regalo Mia (Fla-bred)(Javier Castellano)
- 2012 - Hooh Why (Fla-bred) (John Velazquez)
- 2011 - Trip for A. J. (Fla-bred) (John Velazquez)
- 2010 - Tight Precision (Fla-bred) (Joel Rosario)
- 2009 - Wild Promises (Fla-bred) (Aaron Gryder)
- 2008 - Quite a Bride (Fla-bred) (Garrett Gomez)
- 2007 - Miss Shop (Fla-bred) (Rafael Bejarano)
- 2006 - Moscow Burning (Cal-bred) (David R. Flores)
- 2005 - Valentine Dancer (Cal-bred) (Jon Court)
- 2004 - Valentine Dancer (Cal-bred) (Jon Court)
- 2003 - Stay Forever (Fla-bred) (José A. Santos)
