= Cecil B. DeMille Stakes =

Annual US horse race

- Class: Grade III
- Location: Del Mar Racetrack; Del Mar, California, United States
- Inaugurated: 1982 (as Hoist The Flag Stakes at Hollywood Park Racetrack)
- Race type: Thoroughbred - Flat racing
- Website: Del Mar

Race information
- Distance: 1 mile
- Surface: Turf
- Track: left-handed
- Qualification: Two-years-old
- Weight: 124 lbs. with allowances
- Purse: $100,000 (since 2015)

The Cecil B. DeMille Stakes is a Grade III American Thoroughbred horse race for two-year-olds over a distance of one mile on the turf track scheduled annually in November at Del Mar Racetrack in Del Mar, California. The event currently carries a purse of $100,000.

== History ==
The event was inaugurated on 11 November 1982 as the Hoist The Flag Stakes at Hollywood Park Racetrack and was won by Fifth Division who was trained by A. Thomas Doyle and ridden by the US Hall of Fame jockey Laffit Pincay Jr. in a time of 1:35 3/5. The event was named in honor of Hoist The Flag, the 1970 US Champion Two-Year-Old Colt whose career was cut short due to injury as a three-year-old. Hoist The Flag was successful as a sire and as a broodmare sire, he was the leading juvenile sire in North America in 1981 and the leading broodmare sire in 1987.

In 1986 the event was classified as Grade III and in 1988 the event was upgraded to Grade II. However, the event that year was moved off the turf course and both divisions were held on the muddy dirt course. After one more running the event was downgraded back to Grade III in 1990.

In 1993 the event was renamed to the Generous Stakes after the Irish bred Generous who in a period of seven weeks in 1991 won the Epsom Derby by five lengths, the Irish Derby by three lengths and the King George VI and Queen Elizabeth Stakes by a record seven lengths. In 2005 the event was not held because the newly planted Hollywood Park's turf course had failed to root properly.

The event has been run in split divisions six times, the last of which was in 2006.

With the closure of Hollywood Park Racetrack in 2013 the event was renamed in 2014 to the Cecil B. DeMille Stakes and moved to Del Mar Racetrack. The movie producer Cecil B. DeMille and movie stars often frequented Del Mar Racetrack in the 1930s and ’40s. His grandson, Joseph Harper has been in a management position at Del Mar since 1978 and became CEO of the track in 1990.

== Records ==
Speed record:

- 1 mile: 1:34.28 - The Leopard (2007)

Margins:

- 9 lengths – Incurable Optimist (1998)

Most wins by an owner:

- 2 - Henry Pabst (1991, 1992)
- 2 - Budget Stable (1997, 2015)
- 2 - Gary Barber (2010, 2011)
- 2 - Calumet Farm (2016, 2017)

Most wins by a jockey:

- 5 - Chris McCarron (1983, 1984, 1987, 1996, 1997)

Most wins by a trainer:

- 3 - Bob Baffert (2001, 2012, 2022)

== Winners ==
Year	Winner	Jockey	Trainer	Owner	Distance	Time	Purse	Grade	Ref
At Del Mar – Cecil B. DeMille Stakes
2025	Unrivaled Time	Diego A. Herrera	Leonard Powell	Innergy Racing & Alfred Pais	1 mile	1:36.42	$101,000	III	
2024	Clock Tower	John R. Velazquez	Wesley A. Ward	Mrs. Fitriani Hay	1 mile	1:36.78	$101,000	III	
2023	Stay Hot	Antonio Fresu	Peter Eurton	Burns Racing, Exline-Border Racing, SAF Racing, The Estate of Brereton C. Jones & William Dan Hudock	1 mile	1:35.89	$102,000	III	
2022	Speed Boat Beach	Flavien Prat	Bob Baffert	Karl Watson, Michael E. Pegram & Paul Weitman	1 mile	1:35.38	$101,500	III	
2021	Verbal	Jose Ortiz	Chad Brown	Juddmonte	1 mile	1:36.16	$100,000	III	
2020	Beer Can Man	Juan Hernandez	Mark Glatt	Little Red Feather Racing & Sterling Stable	1 mile	1:34.75	$103,000	III	
2019	Smooth Like Strait	Geovanni Franco	Michael W. McCarthy	Cannon Thoroughbreds	1 mile	1:36.02	$102,808	III	
2018	Flying Scotsman	Flavien Prat	Jerry Hollendorfer	Calumet Farm	1 mile	1:34.44	$100,000	III	
2017	Analyze It	Jose L. Ortiz	Chad Brown	William H. Lawrence	1 mile	1:35.05	$102,070	III	
2016	Term of Art	Joseph Talamo	Doug F. O'Neill	Calumet Farm	1 mile	1:41.69	$100,690	III	Off turf
2015	Dressed in Hermes	Mike E. Smith	Janet Armstrong	Budget Stable	1 mile	1:36.13	$101,750	III	
2014	Conquest Typhoon	Mike E. Smith	Mark E. Casse	Conquest Stables	1 mile	1:36.25	$150,750	III	
At Hollywood Park – Generous Stakes
2013	Global View	Joseph Talamo	Thomas F. Proctor	Glen Hill Farm	1 mile	1:36.25	$100,250	III	
2012	Den's Legacy	Garrett K. Gomez	Bob Baffert	Westrock Stables	1 mile	1:36.32	$100,000	III	
2011	Stoney Fleece	Joel Rosario	John W. Sadler	Cecil & Gary Barber	1 mile	1:34.77	$100,000	III	
2010	Comma to the Top	Corey Nakatani	Peter L. Miller	Gary Barber, Roger Birnbaum & Kevin Tsujihara	1 mile	1:34.77	$100,000	III	
2009	Who's Up	Victor Espinoza	Kathy Walsh	M Racing	1 mile	1:34.39	$100,000	III	
2008	Mr. Rod	Chantal Sutherland	Dan L. Hendricks	Cecil N. Peacock	1 mile	1:35.04	$109,300	III	
2007	The Leopard	Garrett K. Gomez	Todd A. Pletcher	Derrick Smith, Mrs. John Magnier & Michael Tabor	1 mile	1:34.28	$111,800	III	
2006	Warning Zone	Corey Nakatani	John W. Sadler	Rising Sun Racing Stable	1 mile	1:36.59	$75,000	III	Division 1
2006	Whatsthescript (IRE)	Isaias D. Enriquez	Manuel F. Marques	Tommy Town Thoroughbreds	1 mile	1:36.04	$75,000	III	Division 2
2005	Race not held								
2004	Dubleo	Corey Nakatani	Todd A. Pletcher	James T. Scatuorchio, Jake Pletcher & Pete Wetterman	1 mile	1:37.21	$100,000	III	
2003	Castledale (IRE)	Julie Krone	Jeff Mullins	Frank Lyons & Greg Knee	1 mile	1:35.43	$100,000	III	
2002	§ Peace Rules	Victor Espinoza	Robert J. Frankel	Edmund A. Gann	1 mile	1:35.49	$200,000	III	
2001	Mountain Rage	David R. Flores	Bob Baffert	Jacobs & Natalie Moss	1 mile	1:40.31	$200,000	III	
2000	Startac	Alex O. Solis	Simon Bray	Allen E. Paulson Trust	1 mile	1:34.76	$200,000	III	
1999	Jokerman	Pat Day	Neil D. Drysdale	David & Jill Heerensperger	1 mile	1:35.23	$200,000	III	
1998	Incurable Optimist	John R. Velazquez	David G. Donk	John & Theresa Behrendt	1 mile	1:37.72	$250,000	III	
1997	Mantles Star (GB)	Chris McCarron	Kathy Walsh	Budget Stable	1 mile	1:36.73	$250,000	III	
1996	Hello (IRE)	Chris McCarron	Ron McAnally	Al & Saundra S. Kirkwood	1 mile	1:34.77	$250,000	III	
1995	Old Chapel	Gary L. Stevens	John C. Kimmel	Sherwood Stable & December Hill Farm	1 mile	1:35.11	$250,000	III	
1994	Native Regent	Dave Penna	David R. Bell	John A. Franks	1 mile	1:37.15	$250,000	III	
1993	Delineator	Russell Baze	Fordell Fierce	Ron Crockett	1 mile	1:34.73	$250,000	III	
Hoist the Flag Stakes
1992	Earl of Barking (IRE)	Alex O. Solis	Richard J. Cross	Henry Pabst	1 mile	1:34.73	$250,000	III	
1991	Silver Ray	Martin A. Pedroza	Brian A. Mayberry	Ann & Jerry Moss	1 mile	1:35.00	$125,400	III	Division 1
1991	Contested Bid	Corey Nakatani	Maurice Zilber	Henry Pabst	1 mile	1:34.41	$122,400	III	Division 2
1990	Satis (FR)	Corey Black	Christian Doumen	Lonimar Stables	1 mile	1:35.20	$112,800	III	
1989	Single Dawn	Alex O. Solis	Ron McAnally	Jack Kent Cooke	1 mile	1:35.60	$114,600	II	
1988	Music Merci	Gary L. Stevens	Craig Anthony Lewis	Pendleton & Royal T Stable	1 mile	1:36.40	$98,450	II	† Division 1
1988	Shipping Time	Corey Black	Melvin F. Stute	I. S. Longo	1 mile	1:37.20	$98,450	II	† Division 2
1987	Purdue King	Chris McCarron	Irv Guiney	John Valpredo	1 mile	1:36.00	$94,750	III	Division 1
1987	White Mischief	Jose A. Santos	LeRoy Jolley	Peter Brant	1 mile	1:35.80	$112,625	III	Division 2
1986	Persevered	Gary L. Stevens	Laz Barrera	Ethel D. Jacobs	1 1/16 miles	1:41.80	$113,050	III	Division 1
1986	ƒ Sweettuc	Gary L. Stevens	Charles E. Whittingham	Nelson Bunker Hunt	1 1/16 miles	1:41.60	$143,050	III	Division 2
1985	Darby Fair	Antonio Lopez Castanon	Melvin F. Stute	Golden Eagle Farm	1 mile	1:37.00	$191,400		Off turf
1984	Overtrump	Chris McCarron	Jerry M. Fanning	Singer & T 90 Ranch	1 1/16 miles	1:41.80	$146,350		
1983	Artichoke	Bill Shoemaker	Jerry M. Fanning	Tom E. Gentry	1 mile	1:38.80	$93,800		Division 1
1983	Precisionist	Chris McCarron	L. Ross Fenstermaker	Fred W. Hooper	1 mile	1:37.60	$83,950		Division 2
1982	Fifth Division	Laffit Pincay Jr.	A. Thomas Doyle	Mr. & Mrs. Felty J. Yoder	1 mile	1:35.60	$53,450		

Legend:
Dirt Turf
Notes:
§ Ran as an entry
ƒ Filly or Mare
† Off turf

== See also ==
List of American and Canadian Graded races
