= Sunshine Millions Oaks =

The Sunshine Millions Oaks is an American race for thoroughbred horses held in January as part of the eight-race Sunshine Millions series. Run at Santa Anita Park in Arcadia, California or at Gulfstream Park in Hallandale Beach, Florida, half the eight-race series is run at one track and half at the other.

Open to three-year-old fillies willing to race six furlongs on the dirt, the Sunshine Millions Oaks is an ungraded stakes event but carries a purse of $250,000. Inaugurated at seven furlongs in 2003, the race is also known as the Ocala Stud Oaks (in 2006).

In its eighth running in 2010, the series of races called the Sunshine Millions are restricted to horses bred either in Florida or in California and is the brainchild of the Thoroughbred Owners of California, the California Thoroughbred Breeders Association, the Florida Thoroughbred Breeders' and Owners' Association, Inc., Santa Anita Park, Gulfstream Park, and Magna Entertainment Corp.

== Winners ==
Year	Winner	Bred	Jockey	Trainer	Owner	Time
2009	Beltene	CA	Joel Rosario	Jack Carava	La Canada Stable	1:09.16
2008	American County	Fl	Edgar Prado	Dale L. Romans	Mike Tarp	1:10.38
2007	Mistical Plan	CA	David R. Flores	Doug F. O'Neill	J. Paul Reddam	1:10.50
2006	Joint Effort	FL	Eddie Castro	Dale L. Romans	Harry J. Aleo	1:09.49
2005	Hot Storm	FL	Jerry D. Bailey	Dallas Stewart	Robert A. Adams	1:09.16
2004	Silent Sighs	CA	David R. Flores	Julio C. Canani	Pam & Martin Wygod	1:10.82
2003	Atlantic Ocean	FL	David R. Flores	Bob Baffert	The Thoroughbred Corp.	1:23.03
