= Daytona Stakes =

- Class: Grade III
- Location: Santa Anita Park; Arcadia, California, United States
- Inaugurated: 1968 (as San Simeon Handicap)
- Race type: Thoroughbred - Flat racing
- Website: www.santaanita.com

Race information
- Distance: about 6 1/2 furlongs
- Surface: Turf
- Track: Left-handed
- Qualification: Three years old and older
- Weight: 124 lbs. with allowances
- Purse: $100,000

The Daytona Stakes is a Grade III American Thoroughbred horse race for horses three years old and older run over the distance of about 6 1/2 furlongs on the downhill turf scheduled annually in late May at Santa Anita Park in Arcadia, California.

== History ==
The event was inaugurated in 1968 as the San Simeon Handicap

The race has been run at a variety of distances and track surfaces. The race was originally run on the dirt but in 1980 was switched to the downhill turf course. Since that time, it has only been run on dirt when the turf course was unusable due to weather-related conditions. Due to course conditions, several runnings of the event were taken off the turf and run on the dirt track.

The event was upgraded to a Grade III event for 1984.

In 2013 the race was renamed to the San Simeon Stakes.

The event was originally scheduled in April but the Los Angeles Turf Club in 2017 moved the race to the Memorial Day weekend at Santa Anita. In that same year the Los Angeles Turf Club renamed the race to the current name of Daytona Stakes. The original Daytona Stakes was renamed to the San Simeon Stakes. The event was named after the Irish bred horse Daytona who a three year old won the Grade 1 Hollywood Derby and a four year old won the Grade I Shoemaker Mile Stakes at Santa Anita.

In 2019, the distance was shortened by over a furlong, and the event started on the backstretch of the turf oval. In 2020 the event was extended to 5 1/2 furlongs and in 2021 the event was held over 6 1/2 furlongs.

== Records ==
Speed record:

- about 6 1/2 furlongs – 1:11:28 Chips All In (2013)

Margins:

- 4 1/2 lengths – Century's Envoy (1975)

Most wins:

- 2 - Mr. Gruff (2009, 2010)
- 2 - Champagne Bid (1984, 1985)

Most wins by an owner:

- 2 - Elmendorf Farm (1976, 1981)
- 2 - Saddle Hill Farm (1984, 1985)
- 2 - Juddmonte Farms (1989, 2003)
- 2 - Gary Broad (2009, 2010)
- 2 - Hronis Racing (2014, 2022)

Most wins by a jockey:

- 6 - Laffit Pincay, Jr. (1969, 1970, 1976, 1978, 1982, 1983)

Most wins by a trainer:

- 6 - Ron McAnally (1973, 1976, 1977, 1981, 1990, 2007)

== Winners ==
Year	Winner	Age	Jockey	Trainer	Owner	Distance	Time	Purse	Grade	Ref
Daytona Stakes
2026	Freedom's Not Free	4	Juan J. Hernandez	Mark Glatt	Blinkers On Racing Stable, Janlois Racing, Valinor Racing Stable, Tom Corbett, Andy Kwan and Jay Lester Wagner	abt. 6 1/2 furlongs	1:12.49	$100,000	III	
2025	Motorious (GB)	7	Antonio Fresu	Philip D'Amato	Anthony Fanticola	abt. 6 1/2 furlongs	1:13.13	$100,500	III	
2024	Mucho Del Oro	6	Kyle Frey	Doug F. O'Neill	Purple Rein Racing	abt. 6 1/2 furlongs	1:11.37	$102,000	III	
2023	Fast Buck	5	Hector Berrios	Cesar DeAlba	Zepher Racing, Peter Cruz & Cesar DeAlba	abt. 6 1/2 furlongs	1:11.68	$101,000	III	
2022	Bran (FRA)	4	Juan J. Hernandez	John W. Sadler	Hronis Racing	abt. 6 1/2 furlongs	1:12.44	$100,000	III	
2021	Bombard	8	Flavien Prat	Richard E. Mandella	Ramona S. & Perry R. Bass II, Adele B. Dilschneider & Waddell W. Hancock II	6 1/2 furlongs	1:14.47	$100,000	III	
2020	Wildman Jack	4	Mike E. Smith	Doug F. O'Neill	W.C. Racing	5 1/2 furlongs	1:01.01	$101,000	III	
2019	Eddie Haskell	6	Kent J. Desormeaux	Mark Glatt	Philip J. Wood & James Hailey	5 furlongs	0:55.49	$100,702	III	
2018	Conquest Tsunami	6	Victor Espinoza	Peter L. Miller	Gary Barber	abt. 6 1/2 furlongs	1:12.03	$150,000	III	
San Simeon Stakes
2017	Stormy Liberal	5	Norberto Arroyo Jr.	Peter L. Miller	Rockingham Ranch	abt. 6 1/2 furlongs	1:12.43	$147,000	III	
2016	Guns Loaded	5	Rafael Bejarano	Doug F. O'Neill	Westside Rentals.com, Neil Haymes, Leo Rodriguez & Steve Rothblum	abt. 6 1/2 furlongs	1:13.33	$101,380	III	
2015	Get Happy Mister	5	Tyler Baze	Mark D. Tsagalakis	Annette Bishop	abt. 6 1/2 furlongs	1:13.11	$100,500	III	
2014	Sweet Swap	5	Joseph Talamo	John W. Sadler	Hronis Racing	abt. 6 1/2 furlongs	1:11.59	$101,000	III	
2013	Chips All In	4	Tyler Baze	Jeff Mullins	Jean Everest, John O'Brien, Danny Valdez & Michelle Turpin	abt. 6 1/2 furlongs	1:11.28	$100,250	III	
San Simeon Handicap
2012	California Flag	8	Joseph Talamo	Brian J. Koriner	Barbara Card, E-Racing.Com, John Fradkin & Kevin Jacobsen	abt. 6 1/2 furlongs	1:11.59	$100,000	III	
2011	Regally Ready	4	Mike E. Smith	Steven M. Asmussen	Vinery Stables	abt. 6 1/2 furlongs	1:12.33	$100,000	III	
2010	Mr Gruff	6	Joel Rosario	Ronald W. Ellis	Gary Broad	abt. 6 1/2 furlongs	1:11.53	$100,000	III	
2009	Mr Gruff	5	Joel Rosario	Ronald W. Ellis	Gary Broad	abt. 6 1/2 furlongs	1:11.88	$100,000	III	
2008	Stoneside (IRE)	4	Martin A. Pedroza	Julio C. Canani	Marsha Naify	abt. 6 1/2 furlongs	1:12.54	$112,400	III	
2007	Bonfante	6	Aaron Gryder	Ron McAnally	Frankfurt Stables & Eugene Tenbrink	6 1/2 furlongs	1:14.59	$103,488	III	
2006	Pure as Gold	4	Pat Valenzuela	Doug F. O'Neill	Steve L. Keh, Robert Richmond & Dennis O'Neill	abt. 6 1/2 furlongs	1:12.56	$109,400	III	
2005	Shadow of Illinois	5	Mark Guidry	Anthony K. Saavedra	Ella & William. D. Sivage	abt. 6 1/2 furlongs	1:12.62	$107,000	III	
2004	Glick	8	Alex O. Solis	Jeff Mullins	Robert D. Bone	abt. 6 1/2 furlongs	1:11.46	$107,300	III	
2003	Speak in Passing	6	David R. Flores	Robert J. Frankel	Juddmonte Farms	abt. 6 1/2 furlongs	1:12.87	$137,500	III	
2002	Malabar Gold	5	Chris McCarron	Ronald W. Ellis	B. Wayne Hughes	abt. 6 1/2 furlongs	1:11.73	$138,125	III	
2001	Lake William	5	Victor Espinoza	Richard E. Mandella	Ann & Jerry Moss	abt. 6 1/2 furlongs	1:12.34	$133,625	III	
2000	El Cielo	6	Jose Valdivia Jr.	Craig Dollase	Larry Carr, Miller Trust, D & P Webber Trust, et al	abt. 6 1/2 furlongs	1:12.66	$132,400	III	
1999	Naninja	6	Chris McCarron	Mike R. Mitchell	Wes R. Horton, Marlin Merhab & Ed Nance	abt. 6 1/2 furlongs	1:13.32	$108,700	III	
1998	Labeeb (GB)	6	Kent J. Desormeaux	Neil D. Drysdale	Maktoum Al Maktoum	abt. 6 1/2 furlongs	1:12.94	$113,100	III	
1997	Sandtrap	4	Alex O. Solis	Ben D. A. Cecil	Estate Robert E. Hibbert	abt. 6 1/2 furlongs	1:12.50	$156,850	III	
1996	ƒ Ski Dancer	4	Gary L. Stevens	Gary F. Jones	Kallenberg Thoroughbreds	abt. 6 1/2 furlongs	1:13.98	$104,200	III	
1995	Finder's Fortune	6	Pat Valenzuela	Darrell Vienna	David S. Milch & Jack Silverman	abt. 6 1/2 furlongs	1:13.65	$109,550	III	
1994	Rapan Boy (AUS)	6	Gary L. Stevens	Gary F. Jones	Huthart & Moore	abt. 6 1/2 furlongs	1:13.16	$108,100	III	
1993	Exemplary Leader	7	Martin A. Pedroza	Brian A. Mayberry	Jan, Mace & Samantha Siegel	abt. 6 1/2 furlongs	1:13.98	$109,300	III	
1992	ƒ Heart of Joy	5	Chris McCarron	Gary F. Jones	Golden Eagle Farm	abt. 6 1/2 furlongs	1:12.94	$114,600	III	
1991	Forest Glow	4	Julio A. Garcia	Brad MacDonald	John A. Bell III	abt. 6 1/2 furlongs	1:12.40	$108,900	III	
1990	Coastal Voyage	6	Alex O. Solis	Ron McAnally	Red Tree Farm	abt. 6 1/2 furlongs	1:12.20	$106,400	III	
1989	Mazilier	5	Pat Valenzuela	Edwin J. Gregson	Juddmonte Farms	abt. 6 1/2 furlongs	1:15.80	$82,500	III	
1988	Caballo de Oro	4	Rafael Q. Meza	Lewis A. Cenicola	Humberto Ascanio, Fer & Zankich	6 1/2 furlongs	1:15.40	$80,450	III	
1987	Bolder Than Bold	5	Gary Baze	Charles E. Whittingham	Mary Jones Bradley, Ann Chandler & Charles E. Whittingham	abt. 6 1/2 furlongs	1:13.60	$83,550	III	
1986	§ Estate	7	Antonio Lopez Castanon	Jack Van Berg	Tom E. Norton	abt. 6 1/2 furlongs	1:13.80	$88,150	III	
1985	Champagne Bid	6	Ray Sibille	Randy Winick	Saddle Hill Farm	abt. 6 1/2 furlongs	1:13.60	$97,150	III	
1984	Champagne Bid	5	Ray Sibille	Randy Winick	Saddle Hill Farm & Randy Winick	abt. 6 1/2 furlongs	1:14.40	$89,350	III	
1983	Chinook Pass	4	Laffit Pincay Jr.	Laurie N. Anderson	Hi Yu Stable	6 1/2 furlongs	1:15.40	$66,100	Listed	
1982	Shagbark	7	Laffit Pincay Jr.	Robert J. Frankel	Mr. & Mrs. Martin Ritt	abt. 6 1/2 furlongs	1:13.00	$66,850	Listed	
1981	Syncopate	6	Donald Pierce	Ron McAnally	Elmendorf Farm	6 1/2 furlongs	1:16.40	$53,950	Listed	
1980	Dragon Command (NZ)	6	Eddie Delahoussaye	Michael C. Whittingham	Ivan W. Allan & Lee Ah Seong	abt. 6 1/2 furlongs	1:12.60	$47,050	Listed	
1979	Bywayofchicago	5	Darrel G. McHargue	Thomas A. Pratt	Robert Fluor, Sidney Port & Herman Sarkowsky	7 furlongs	1:21.80	$56,350	Listed	
1978	Maheras	5	Laffit Pincay Jr.	Lin Wheeler	Peter Cristofi & Nicholas P. Bissias	7 furlongs	1:22.80	$43,650	Listed	
1977	Mark's Place	5	Sandy Hawley	Ron McAnally	Bob D. Bird	7 furlongs	1:21.00	$44,250	Listed	
1976	Pay Tribute	4	Laffit Pincay Jr.	Ron McAnally	Elmendorf Farm	1 mile	1:35.20	$43,650	Listed	
1975	Century's Envoy	4	Jorge Tejeira	Jerry Dutton	Mr. & Mrs. John J. Elmore	7 furlongs	1:22.40	$33,200	Listed	
1974	Matun	5	Steve Valdez	Charles E. Whittingham	Marjorie Everett	7 furlongs	1:21.20	$34,700	III	
1973	Soft Victory	5	Donald Pierce	Ron McAnally	Maxwell R. Prestridge Jr.	7 furlongs	1:21.40	$36,550	III	
1972	Single Agent	4	Howard Grant	Wayne B. Stucki	Indian Hill Stable & Frank Marshall	7 furlongs	1:21.00	$34,700		
1971	Long Position	5	Johnny Sellers	Morton Lipton	Westerly Stud	7 furlongs	1:21.80	$27,650		
1970	Right Cross	4	Laffit Pincay Jr.	Ted Saladin	Mr. & Mrs. Bert W. Martin	7 furlongs	1:21.60	$23,050		
1969	Ottawa Hills	6	Laffit Pincay Jr.	John Adams	Hasty House Farms	7 furlongs	1:22.20	$23,850		
1968	Poona Khan	7	Miguel Yanez	John W. Pappalardo	Jay F. Walker	7 furlongs	1:22.00	$23,000		

Legend:
Dirt Turf
Notes:
§ Ran as an entry
ƒ Filly or Mare

== See also ==
List of American and Canadian Graded races
