= Caracortado =

American-bred Thoroughbred racehorse

- Sire: Cat Dreams
- Grandsire: Storm Cat
- Dam: Mons Venus
- Damsire: Maria's Mon
- Sex: Gelding
- Foaled: 2007
- Country: United States
- Colour: Chestnut
- Breeder: Mike Machowsky
- Owner: Blahut Racing, LLC (Donald Blahut) & Lo Hi Racing (Machowsky)
- Trainer: Mike Machowsky
- Jockey: Joe Talamo
- Record: 17: 8-2-3
- Earnings: $774,105 (€537,162)

Major wins
- California Breeders' Champion Stakes (2009); Robert B. Lewis Stakes (2010); Sunshine Millions Turf Stakes (2011); Del Mar Mile Handicap (2011); GIIIT Daytona Stakes (2012)

Awards
- Champion California-bred 2-year-Old male (2009); Champion California-bred 3-Year-Old Male (2010)
- Last updated on May 22, 2017

Caracortado (foaled May 7, 2007, in California) is an American Thoroughbred racehorse. His sire, Cat Dreams, is a son of the influential stallion Storm Cat. His dam, Mons Venus, is by Maria's Mon, the American Champion Two-Year-Old Male Horse of 1995 who won the Sanford Stakes, the Champagne Stakes, and the Belmont Futurity Stakes. Maria's Mon also sired Kentucky Derby winners Monarchos and Super Saver.

Caracortado is owned by Blahut Racing, LLC & Lo Hi Racing, and is bred and trained by Mike Machowsky.

== Racing career ==
Caracortado (Spanish for “scarface“), a specialist on turf, was named as a juvenile by Machowsky for a scar down the middle of his head. Caracortado's sire, Cat Dreams, previously stood for a $1,500 stud fee. The chestnut Californian-bred gelding went undefeated through his first four starts at age two, capped by a victory in the 2009 California Breeders' Champion Stakes. At three, Caracortado won the 2010 Robert B. Lewis Stakes (G2), establishing himself as among the better three-year-old colts in North America when he drew off to a 1 3/4 length score over highly regarded sophomores Dave In Dixie, American Lion, and Tiz Chrome. With this win, the grandson of Storm Cat moved his career record to five wins in five starts. Caracortado lost his perfect status when he finished third in the San Felipe Stakes (G2) to Sidney's Candy and Interactif. A troubled fourth in the Santa Anita Derby (G1) in April, he lacked sufficient graded earnings to enter the Kentucky Derby, and he then finished seventh in the Preakness Stakes (G1).

Following a six-month freshening after the Preakness, Caracortado returned under new rider Joe Talamo with a win in his turf debut in a November 11 optional claiming race at Hollywood Park, defeating older rivals in near-record time. Entered in the December 26 Malibu Stakes (G1) on dirt at Santa Anita Park, he finished third to track record-setter Twirling Candy and Smiling Tiger. On January 29, 2011, he returned to grass as a newly turned four-year-old in the Sunshine Millions Turf with a win in fast time over older graded stakes winners The Usual Q.T., Presious Passion, and Jeranimo. Bet to the 6/5 favorite in a field of ten for the grade one Frank E. Kilroe Mile Handicap, he came from far back to just miss in a photo finish to Fluke in the fastest turf mile of the Santa Anita meeting. He skipped an international campaign through the spring and focused on top North American grass races leading up to the November Breeders Cup at Churchill Downs. On July 3, 2011, Caracortado finished second to Courageous Cat in the grade one Shoemaker Mile Stakes at Hollywood Park on turf. On August 27, 2011, he won the grade two Del Mar Mile Handicap on turf.

After finishing fifth in the Breeders' Cup Turf Sprint to Regally Ready after a wide trip, Caracortado made his 2012 debut in the January 8 Grade IIIT Daytona Stakes over Santa Anita's downhill turf course. He came from far back in a short field to score by 1 1/4 lengths over Victory Pete and Regally Ready.
