= San Simeon Stakes =

- Class: Grade III
- Location: Santa Anita Park; Arcadia, California, United States
- Inaugurated: 2004 as Daytona Handicap
- Race type: Thoroughbred - Flat racing
- Website: www.santaanita.com

Race information
- Distance: 6 furlongs
- Surface: Turf
- Track: Left-handed
- Qualification: Three-year-olds & older
- Weight: 124 lbs with allowances
- Purse: $100,000

The San Simeon Stakes is a Grade III American Thoroughbred horse race for horses aged three years old or older over the distance of about six and one-half furlongs on the turf scheduled annually in March at Santa Anita Park in Arcadia, California.

== History ==
The event was inaugurated in 2004 as the Daytona Handicap.

Due to course conditions, several runnings of the Daytona Handicap were taken off the turf and run on the dirt track.

The event was upgraded to a Grade III event for 2009.

In 2011 the race was renamed to the Daytona Stakes.

The event was originally scheduled in February but the Los Angeles Turf Club in late 2012 moved the race to the start of the winter racing meet at Santa Anita whereby the race was run twice in the calendar year.

In 2016 the Los Angeles Turf Club renamed the race to the current name. The original San Simeon Stakes was renamed to the Daytona Stakes.

2020 saw the race shortened to 5 1/2 furlongs on turf, using the backstretch start, but since 2021, the distance was extended to the current six furlongs.

== Records ==
Speed record:

- 6 1/2 furlongs: 1:11.21 – Law Abidin Citizen (2019)
- 5 1/2 furlongs: 1:02.68 – Cistron (2020)

Margins:

- 2 1/2 lengths – Desert Code (2009)

Most wins:

- 2 – Bettys Bambino (2014, 2016)

Most wins by an owner:

- 2 – Sharon Alesia, Bran Jam Stable & Ciaglia Racing (2014, 2016)
- 2 – Gary Barber (2012, 2018)

Most wins by a jockey:

- 2 – Garrett Gomez (2005, 2011)
- 2 – Tiago Josue Pereira (2015, 2019)
- 2 – Juan J. Hernandez (2021, 2024)

Most wins by a trainer:

- 3 – Philip D'Amato (2015, 2021, 2023)

== Winners ==
Year	Winner	Age	Jockey	Trainer	Owner	Distance	Time	Purse	Grade	Ref
San Simeon Stakes
2026	Sumter	7	Mike E. Smith	Richard E. Mandella	Perry R. Bass II and Ramona S. Bass	abt. 6 1/2 furlongs	1:12.80	$100,500	III	
2025	Air Force Red	7	Armando Ayuso	Leonard Powell	Eclipse Thoroughbred Partners and Holly Golightly	abt. 6 1/2 furlongs	1:12.99	$101,000	III	
2024	Mucho Del Oro	6	Juan J. Hernandez	Doug F. O'Neill	Purple Rein Racing	abt. 6 1/2 furlongs	1:12.76	$101,500	III	
2023	Motorious (GB)	4	Flavien Prat	Philip D'Amato	Anthony Fanticola	abt. 6 1/2 furlongs	1:11.34	$101,000	III	
2022	Barraza	4	Daisuke Fukumoto	Vladimir Cerin	Holly & David Wilson	abt. 6 1/2 furlongs	1:12.66	$101,500	III	
2021	Gregorian Chant (GB)	6	Juan Hernandez	Philip D'Amato	Old Bones Racing Stable, Slam Dunk Racing & Michael Nentwig	6 furlongs	1:08.79	$100,500	III	
2020	Cistron	6	Victor Espinoza	John W. Sadler	Hronis Racing	5 1/2 furlongs	1:02.68	$101,000	III	
2019	Law Abidin Citizen	5	Tiago Josue Pereira	Mark Glatt	Dan J. Agnew, Gerry Schneider & John V. Xitco	abt. 6 1/2 furlongs	1:11.21	$100,702	III	
2018	ƒ Belvoir Bay (GB)	6	Tyler Baze	Peter L. Miller	Team Valor International & Gary Barber	abt. 6 1/2 furlongs	1:12.37	$100,345	III	
2017	Race not held									
2016	Bettys Bambino	6	Joel Rosario	Peter Eurton	Sharon Alesia, Bran Jam Stable & Ciaglia Racing	abt. 6 1/2 furlongs	1:11.95	$102,415	III	
Daytona Stakes
2015	Toowindytohaulrox	4	Tiago Josue Pereira	Philip D'Amato	Queen Bee Racing	abt. 6 1/2 furlongs	1:14.26	$101,750	III	
2014	Bettys Bambino	4	Martin Garcia	Peter Eurton	Sharon Alesia, Bran Jam Stable & Ciaglia Racing	abt. 6 1/2 furlongs	1:12.49	$101,000	III	
2013	Unbridled's Note	4	Corey Nakatani	Steven M. Asmussen	Mike McCarty	abt. 6 1/2 furlongs	1:11.89	$100,500	III	
2012	Comma to the Top	4	Edwin A. Maldonado	Peter L. Miller	Gary Barber, Roger Birnbaum & Kevin Tsujihara	6 1/2 furlongs	1:14.55	$100,000	III	December
2012	Caracortado	5	Rafael Bejarano	Michael Machowsky	AJL Productions, Blahut Racing & Lo Hi Racing	abt. 6 1/2 furlongs	1:11.59	$98,000	III	January
2011	Dilemma	7	Garrett K. Gomez	Thomas F. Proctor	Glen Hill Farm	abt. 6 1/2 furlongs	1:12.28	$100,000	III	
2010	Race not held									
Daytona Handicap
2009	Desert Code	5	Aaron Gryder	David E. Hofmans	Tarabilla Farms	abt. 6 1/2 furlongs	1:12.58	$100,000	III	
2008	Cheroot	7	Martin A. Pedroza	Darrell Vienna	Charlotte M. Wrather	abt. 6 1/2 furlongs	1:12.82	$98,650	Listed	
2007	Night Chapter (GB)	6	Brice Blanc	Robert J. Frankel	Robert J. Frankel & Diamond Pride	abt. 6 1/2 furlongs	1:12.57	$80,000	Listed	
2006	Siren Lure	5	Alex O. Solis	Art Sherman	Stuart Kesselman, Tony & Marilyn Melkonian	6 1/2 furlongs	1:16.20	$85,140	Listed	Off turf
2005	Royal Place	5	Garrett K. Gomez	Rafael Becerra	K. K. Sangara	6 1/2 furlongs	1:14.03	$78,600	Listed	Off turf
2004	Tsigane (FR)	5	David R. Flores	Julio C. Canani	Prestonwood Farm	abt. 6 1/2 furlongs	1:12.49	$71,000		

Legend:
Turf Dirt
Notes:
ƒ Filly or Mare

== See also ==
- List of American and Canadian Graded races
