= Lazaro Barrera Stakes =

American horse race in California

Lázaro Barrera Stakes
- Class: Listed
- Location: Santa Anita Park; Arcadia, California
- Inaugurated: 1953 (as Playa Del Rey Stakes at Hollywood Park Racetrack)
- Race type: Thoroughbred - Flat racing
- Website: santaanita.com

Race information
- Distance: 6 1/2 furlongs
- Surface: Dirt
- Track: left-handed
- Qualification: Three-year-olds
- Weight: 124 lbs. with allowances
- Purse: $100,000

The Lázaro Barrera Stakes is a Listed American Thoroughbred horse race for three years old horses. It is run over a distance of 6 1/2 furlongs on a dirt track and is held annually in June at Santa Anita Park in Arcadia, California.

== History ==
The event is named in honor of United States Triple Crown and Hall of Fame trainer Lázaro "Laz" Barrera.

The inaugural date of the event is unclear since there are two separate races that converged into the current event. The Los Angeles Turf Club, which holds the event at Santa Anita, believe that the current Lázaro Barrera Stakes had its beginnings with the Playa Del Rey Stakes, which had its first race in 1953 at Hollywood Park Racetrack in Inglewood, California. This event was ment for Californian bred three year old fillies at a distance of 7 furlongs. The event took place one more time in 1954 and then again in 1995.

The other path merits consideration, regarding the first race of the Affirmed Handicap in 1981, the event was named after the 1978 United States Triple Crown Champion Affirmed who was trained by Lázaro Barrera. This event was held in the fall and was changed in 1991 by the Hollywood Turf Club to the Lazaro S. Barrera Handicap four years before the renewal of the Playa Del Rey Stakes in 1995, the implied predecessor to the current event.

In 1999 the Hollywood Turf Club scheduled the Lazaro Barrera Memorial Stakes in late May at the current distance of 7 furlongs.

The event was upgraded to a Grade II event in 2002, and was downgraded to Grade III in 2007. In 2013 the event was run as the Listed Came Home Stakes. In 2022 the event was downgraded to Listed.

== Records ==
Speed record:

- 7 furlongs: 1:20.42 - Early Flyer (2001)
- 1 1/16 miles: 1:40.83 - Goldigger's Dream (1993)

Margins:

- 6 lengths – Sea Cadet (1991)

Most wins by a trainer:

- 4 - Ron McAnally (1991, 1996, 1997, 2001)

Most wins by a jockey:

- 5 - Chris McCarron (1982, 1983, 1984, 1985, 2001)

Most wins by an owner:

- 3 - VHW Stables (1991, 1996, 2001)

== Winners ==
=== Lazaro Barrera Stakes ===
Year	Winner	Jockey	Trainer	Owner	Distance	Time	Purse	Grade	Ref
At Santa Anita Park – Lazaro Barrera Stakes
2021	The Chosen Vron	Umberto Rispoli	J. Eric Kruljac	J. Eric Kruljac, Robert Fetkin, John Sondereker & Richard Thornburgh	6 1/2 furlongs	1:16.28	$98,000	III	
2020	Collusion Illusion	Flavien Prat	Mark Glatt	Dan J. Agnew, Rodney E. Orr, Jerry Schneider & John V. Xitco	6 1/2 furlongs	1:16.03	$100,000	III	
2019	Mucho Gusto	Joseph Talamo	Bob Baffert	Michael Lund Petersen	7 furlongs	1:22.96	$100,351	III	
2018	Kanthaka	Flavien Prat	Jerry Hollendorfer	West Point Thoroughbreds	7 furlongs	1:23.25	$100,345	III	
2017	American Anthem	Mike E. Smith	Bob Baffert	WinStar Farm, China Horse Club, SF Racing & Head of Plains Partners	7 furlongs	1:22.02	$100,000	III	
2016	I Will Score	Martin Garcia	Jerry Hollendorfer	Hans Poetsch	7 furlongs	1:21.30	$100,690	III	
2015	Kentuckian	Mike E. Smith	Jerry Hollendorfer	Fox Hill Farms	7 furlongs	1:20.97	$100,250	III	
2014	Top Fortitude	Kayla Stra	R. Kory Owens	Triple AAA Ranch	7 furlongs	1:22.98	$100,500	III	
At Hollywood Park – Came Home Stakes
2013	Let Em Shine	Edwin A. Maldonado	Adam Kitchingman	William R. Peeples	7 furlongs	1:21.65	$71,850		
Lazaro Barrera Memorial Stakes
2012	Drill	Martin Garcia	Bob Baffert	Karl Watson, Michael E. Pegram & Paul Weitman	7 furlongs	1:22.88	$98,000	III	
2011	Bench Points	Rafael Bejarano	Tim Yakteen	Donnie Crevier, Linda Mariani, Charles V. Martin & Mary J. Zuraitis	7 furlongs	1:22.50	$100,000	III	
2010	Smiling Tiger	Victor Espinoza	Jeffrey L. Bonde	Philip Lebherz & Alan Klein	7 furlongs	1:21.34	$100,000	III	
2009	Charlie's Moment	Alex O. Solis	Walther Solis	Robert Gramer, David Pycz, Michael Nicolarsen, Jerry Rasky & Walther Solis	7 furlongs	1:21.89	$100,000	III	
2008	Two Step Salsa	Martin A. Pedroza	Julio C. Canani	Everest Stables	7 furlongs	1:20.66	$107,200	III	
2007	Time to Get Even	David R. Flores	Walther Solis	Murrietta Stable, Lopez, Joe, Mario, et al.	7 furlongs	1:21.91	$109,700	III	
2006	Northern Soldier	Chance J. Rollins	Brian J. Koriner	Julie Berta, E Racing.Com & Wind River Stable	7 furlongs	1:22.46	$150,000	II	
2005	Storm Wolf	Alex O. Solis	Bruce Headley	Mercedes Stable & Marsha Naify	7 furlongs	1:22.26	$150,000	II	
2004	Twice as Bad	Alex O. Solis	Vladimir Cerin	Mercedes Stable	7 furlongs	1:21.57	$150,000	II	
2003	Blazonry	Mike E. Smith	Kathy Walsh	Sanford Robertson	7 furlongs	1:22.19	$150,000	II	
2002	Captain Squire	Chance J. Rollins	Jeff Mullins	Robert Bone & Jeffrey Diener	7 furlongs	1:21.95	$150,000	II	
2001	Early Flyer	Chris McCarron	Ron McAnally	VHW Stables	7 furlongs	1:20.42	$108,600	III	
2000	Caller One	Corey Nakatani	James K. Chapman	Carolyn Chapman & Theresa McArthur	7 furlongs	1:21.10	$99,568	Listed	
1999	Love That Red	Garrett K. Gomez	Leonard M. Duncan	Terry D. Wells	7 furlongs	1:20.81	$85,828	Listed	
Playa Del Rey Stakes
1998	Reraise	Eddie Delahoussaye	Craig Dollase	B. Fey, M. Han, L. Opas, F. Sinatra & Class Racing Stable	6 furlongs	1:08.51	$68,110	Listed	
1997	Race not held								
Playa Del Rey Handicap
1996	Future Quest	Kent J. Desormeaux	Ron McAnally	VHW Stables	6 1/2 furlongs	1:15.17	$62,100	Listed	
1995	Flying Standby	Chris Antley	Heath Stokes	Joseph D. Kowal	6 furlongs	1:09.09	$71,700	Listed	
1955–1994		Race not held							
Playa Del Rey Stakes
1954	† Milla's Abbey	Bill Shoemaker	Reggie Cornell	Biff Stables	6 furlongs	1:09.09	$16,375		
1953	† Perfection	Bill Shoemaker	Hack Ross	Clifton H. Jones & Sons	7 furlongs	1:23.20	$17,300		

=== Lazaro S. Barrera Handicap ===
Year	Winner	Jockey	Trainer	Owner	Distance	Time	Purse	Grade	Ref
At Hollywood Park – Lazaro S. Barrera Handicap
1998	Mazel Trick	Kent J. Desormeaux	Robert J. Frankel	Three Plus U Stables	1 1/16 miles	1:41.42	$98,000	III	
1997	Kukulcan	Alex O. Solis	Ron McAnally	Alex G. Campbell, Jr.	1 1/16 miles	1:42.02	$98,000	III	
1996	Victory Speech	Gary L. Stevens	D. Wayne Lukas	Michael Tabor, Mrs. John Magnier	1 1/16 miles	1:41.31	$106,100	III	
1995	Score Quick	Goncalino Almeida	Melvin F. Stute	Bill M. Thomas	1 1/16 miles	1:41.99	$107,300	III	
1994	College Town	Laffit Pincay Jr.	Melvin F. Stute	David N. Brown	1 1/16 miles	1:41.13	$100,000	III	
1993	Goldigger's Dream	Kent J. Desormeaux	Dan L. Hendricks	Ed & Natalie Friendly	1 1/16 miles	1:40.83	$107,200	III	
1992	Star Recruit	Laffit Pincay Jr.	Jerry M. Fanning	Dan Dar Farm	1 1/16 miles	1:41.04	$108,500	III	
1991	Sea Cadet	Martin A. Pedroza	Ron McAnally	VHW Stables	1 1/16 miles	1:42.30	$109,200	III	
Affirmed Handicap For the thoroughbred horse race that was renamed from the Silver Screen Handicap to the Affirmed Handicap in 1993, see Affirmed Stakes (LATC).
1990	Greydar	Gary L. Stevens	D. Wayne Lukas	Calumet Farm	1 mile	1:33.40	$108,900	III	
1989	Exploding Prospect	Laffit Pincay Jr.	Vladimir Cerin	Marge & Irving Cowan	1 mile	1:34.20	$112,300	III	
1988	Speedratic	Gary L. Stevens	Mike R. Mitchell	Robert Kerlan et al.	1 mile	1:36.40	$112,800	III	
1987	W. D. Jacks	Laffit Pincay Jr.	Neil D. Drysdale	William K. Warren, Jr.	1 mile	1:34.60	$114,600	III	
1986	Cheapskate	Gary L. Stevens	Darrell Vienna	Triple Dot Dash Stable	1 mile	1:35.40	$83,100	III	
1985	Turkoman	Chris McCarron	Gary F. Jones	Saron Stable	1 mile	1:34.20	$84,300	III	
1984	Bean Bag	Chris McCarron	Noble Threewitt	Connie M. Ring	1 1/16 miles	1:41.80	$81,100	II	
1983	Glacial Stream	Chris McCarron	Gordon C. Campbell	Estate of Bernard J. Ridder	1 1/16 miles	1:41.20	$87,250		
1982	Poley	Chris McCarron	Richard E. Mandella	Hal Oliver & Sam Bretzfield	1 1/16 miles	1:41.00	$84,450		
1981	It's the One	Walter Guerra	Laz Barrera	Amin Saiden	1 1/16 miles	1:41.80	$85,250		

Legend:
All Weather Track Dirt
Notes:
† Filly or Mare

== See also ==
- List of American and Canadian Graded races
