= Del Mar Mile Stakes =

- Class: Grade II
- Location: Del Mar Racetrack; Del Mar, California, United States
- Inaugurated: 1987 (as Del Mar Budweiser Breeders' Cup)
- Race type: Thoroughbred - Flat racing
- Website: Del Mar

Race information
- Distance: 1 mile (8 furlongs)
- Surface: Turf
- Track: Left-handed
- Qualification: Three-year-olds and older
- Weight: Base weights with allowances: Older: 126 lbs 3YOs: 122 lbs
- Purse: $300,000 (2021)

The Del Mar Mile Stakes is a Grade II American Thoroughbred horse race for horses aged three years and older run over a distance of one mile on the turf held annually in August at Del Mar Racetrack in Del Mar, California. The event currently carries a purse of $150,000.

== History ==
The event was inaugurated on September 2, 1987, with additional sponsorship from Budweiser and the Breeders' Cup at a distance of as a one-mile race on the dirt track and was won by the 9:1 shot Good Command, who was ridden by United States' Racing Hall of Fame jockey Chris McCarron in a time of 1:35 4/5. The following year the event was by Precisionist, the 1985 U.S. Champion Sprint Horse who had come out of retirement after an unsuccessful stud career.

For the third running the event had been classified as Grade III and the next year in 1990 a Grade II, the current classification.

Budweiser continued sponsorship until 1995 and the Breeders' Cup until 2006. After sponsorship ceased the event was renamed by the Del Mar administration to Del Mar Mile Handicap.

In 2005 the event was moved from the dirt track to the turf.

In 2021 the conditions of the event were changed from a handicap to a stakes allowance.

== Records ==
Speed record:

- 1 mile (turf): 1:32.10 - Obviously (IRE) (2012)
- 1 mile (dirt): 1:33.40 - On The Line (1989)

Margins:

- 5 lengths - Old Trieste (1998)

Most wins:

- 2 - El Corredor (2000, 2001)
- 2 - Obviously (IRE) (2012, 2013)
- 2 - Mo Forza (2020, 2021)

Most wins by an owner:

- 2 - Hal J. Earnhardt (2000, 2001)
- 2 - Anthony Fanticola & Joseph Scardino (2012, 2013)
- 2 - Bardy Farm & OG Boss (2020, 2021)

Most wins by a jockey:

- 4 - Chris McCarron (1987, 1988, 1995, 1998)
- 4 - Flavien Prat (2020, 2021, 2022, 2023)

Most wins by a trainer:

- 4 - Bob Baffert (2000, 2001, 2002. 2023)

== Winners ==
Year	Winner	Age	Jockey	Trainer	Owner	Distance	Time	Purse	Grade	Ref
Del Mar Mile Stakes
2026	King of Gosford (GB)	5	Umberto Rispoli	Philip D'Amato	Benowitz Family Trust, CYBT, Saul Gevertz, Michael Nintwig and Jeremy Peskoff	1 mile	1:34.22	$300,000	II	
2025	Formidable Man	4	Umberto Rispoli	Michael W. McCarthy	Suzanne & William K. Warren Jr.	1 mile	1:34.20	$300,500	II	
2024	Conclude	4	Hector Berrios	Bob Baffert	Little Red Feather Racing, Sterling Stables & Marsha Naify	1 mile	1:34.05	$302,500	II	
2023	Du Jour	5	Flavien Prat	Bob Baffert	Natalie J. Baffert & Debbie Lanni	1 mile	1:33.82	$302,500	II	
2022	Hong Kong Harry	5	Flavien Prat	Philip D'Amato	Scott Anastasi, Jimmy Ukegawa, Tony Valazza	1 mile	1:33.15	$302,000	II	
2021	Mo Forza	5	Flavien Prat	Peter Miller	Bardy Farm & OG Boss	1 mile	1:35.03	$300,000	II	
Del Mar Mile Handicap
2020	Mo Forza	4	Flavien Prat	Peter Miller	Bardy Farm & OG Boss	1 mile	1:33.27	$152,000	II	
2019	Prince Earl	4	Geovanni Franco	Philip D'Amato	Old Bones Racing Stable & Todd Marshall	1 mile	1:33.13	$201,755	II	
2018	Catapult	5	Drayden Van Dyke	John W. Sadler	Woodford Racing	1 mile	1:33.40	$202,760	II	
2017	Blackjackcat	4	Kent J. Desormeaux	Mark Glatt	Al & Saundra S. Kirkwood	1 mile	1:34.06	$200,345	II	
2016	Midnight Storm	5	Rafael Bejarano	Philip D'Amato	A Venneri Racing & Little Red Feather Racing	1 mile	1:33.92	$200,000	II	
2015	Avanzare	5	Gary L. Stevens	Thomas F. Proctor	Donato Lanni & John F. Youngblood	1 mile	1:35.22	$201,250	II	
2014	Tom's Tribute	4	Mike E. Smith	James M. Cassidy	Braly Family Trust	1 mile	1:33.75	$250,500	II	
2013	Obviously (IRE)	5	Joseph Talamo	Mike R. Mitchell	Anthony Fanticola & Joseph Scardino	1 mile	1:32.64	$200,000	II	
2012	Obviously (IRE)	4	Joseph Talamo	Mike R. Mitchell	Anthony Fanticola & Joseph Scardino	1 mile	1:32.10	$200,000	II	
2011	Caracortado	4	Joseph Talamo	Michael Machowsky	Blahut Racing & Lo Hi Racing	1 mile	1:34.24	$200,000	II	
2010	Enriched	5	Joel Rosario	Doug F. O'Neill	W.C. Racing, Neil Haymes & Westside Rentals.com	1 mile	1:34.83	$190,000	II	
2009	Ferneley (IRE)	5	Joel Rosario	Ben D. A. Cecil	Silver Springs Stud Farm	1 mile	1:33.11	$238,000	II	
2008	Whatsthescript (IRE)	4	Garrett K. Gomez	John W. Sadler	Tommy Town Thoroughbreds	1 mile	1:32.40	$328,000	II	
2007	Crossing The Line (NZ)	5	Garrett K. Gomez	John W. Sadler	Doubledown Stable & Mike MacQuoid	1 mile	1:32.59	$322,000	II	
Del Mar Breeders' Cup Handicap
2006	Aragorn (IRE)	4	Corey Nakatani	Neil D. Drysdale	Ballygallon Stud	1 mile	1:32.68	$374,000	II	
2005	Three Valleys	4	Pat Valenzuela	Robert J. Frankel	Juddmonte Farms	1 mile	1:32.21	$338,000	II	
2004	Supah Blitz	4	Victor Espinoza	Doug F. O'Neill	Kagele Brothers & Mark Lieb	1 mile	1:35.14	$250,000	II	
2003	Joey Franco	4	Pat Valenzuela	Darrell Vienna	Jerry Frankel	1 mile	1:35.70	$178,000	II	
2002	Congaree	4	Mike E. Smith	Bob Baffert	Stonerside Stable	1 mile	1:36.34	$250,000	II	
2001	El Corredor	4	Victor Espinoza	Bob Baffert	Hal J. Earnhardt	1 mile	1:35.24	$250,000	II	
2000	El Corredor	3	Victor Espinoza	Bob Baffert	Hal J. Earnhardt	1 mile	1:35.05	$178,000	II	
1999	Hollycombe	5	Gary L. Stevens	J. Paco Gonzalez	John Toffan	1 mile	1:35.46	$195,100	II	
1998	Old Trieste	3	Chris McCarron	Mike Puype	Cobra Farm Inc.	1 mile	1:35.35	$186,200	II	
1997	Benchmark	6	Eddie Delahoussaye	Ronald W. Ellis	Pam & Martin Wygod	1 mile	1:35.57	$206,700	II	
1996	Dramatic Gold	5	Kent J. Desormeaux	David E. Hofmans	Golden Eagle Farm	1 mile	1:34.78	$205,650	II	
Del Mar Budweiser Breeders' Cup Handicap
1995	Alphabet Soup	4	Chris McCarron	David E. Hofmans	Ridder Thoroughbred Stable	1 mile	1:34.33	$164,650	II	
1994	Lykatill Hil	4	Eddie Delahoussaye	Art Sherman	William J. Zellerbach	1 mile	1:34.01	$152,200	II	
1993	Region	4	Corey Nakatani	Richard E. Mandella	Claiborne Farm	1 mile	1:34.98	$169,600	II	
1992	Reign Road	4	David R. Flores	Jay M. Robbins	Jack Kent Cooke	1 mile	1:35.29	$182,000	II	
1991	Twilight Agenda	5	Kent J. Desormeaux	D. Wayne Lukas	Moyglare Stud Farm	1 mile	1:34.00	$206,950	II	
1990	Stalwart Charger	3	Roberto M. Gonzalez	Alcides Pico Perdomo	Sidney B. Factor	1 mile	1:34.60	$206,500	II	
1989	On the Line	5	Laffit Pincay Jr.	D. Wayne Lukas	Eugene V. Klein	1 mile	1:33.40	$205,400	III	
1988	Precisionist	7	Chris McCarron	John W. Russell	Fred W. Hooper	1 mile	1:34.60	$148,900		
1987	Good Command	4	Chris McCarron	Gary F. Jones	Prestonwood Farm	1 mile	1:34.80	$153,750		

Legend:
Dirt Turf

== See also ==
List of American and Canadian Graded races
