= Sunshine Millions Distaff =

- Class: Ungraded
- Location: Alternates: Santa Anita Park & Gulfstream Park
- Inaugurated: 2003
- Race type: Thoroughbred
- Website: www.sunshinemillions.com

Race information
- Distance: 1 1/8 miles
- Surface: Dirt
- Track: Left-handed
- Qualification: 4-y-o & Up, Fillies and Mares
- Purse: $200,000

The Sunshine Millions Distaff is a race for thoroughbred horses held in January at Santa Anita Park in Arcadia, California or at Gulfstream Park in Hallandale Beach, Florida. Half the eight races of the Sunshine Millions are run at one track and half at the other.

Open to fillies and mares four-years-old and older willing to race one and one/eighth miles on the dirt, the Sunshine Millions Distaff is an ungraded stakes event but currently carries a purse of $200,000. This race is also known as the Ocala Breeders' Sales Distaff (in 2006) as part of the eight-race Sunshine Millions series.

In its 16th running in 2017, the series of races called the Sunshine Millions are restricted to horses bred either in Florida or in California and is the brainchild of the Thoroughbred Owners of California, the California Thoroughbred Breeders Association, the Florida Thoroughbred Breeders' and Owners' Association, Inc., Santa Anita Park, Gulfstream Park, and Magna Entertainment Corporation.

== Winners of the Sunshine Millions Distaff ==
Year	Winner	Age	Jockey	Trainer	Owner	Time
2016	Mom'z Laugh	4	Javier Castellano	Marcus J. Vitali	A. Bianco Holding	1:22.96
2015	Dame Dorothy	4	Edgar S. Prado	Todd Pletcher	Bobby Flay	1:23.26
2014	Sweet N Discreet	FL-4	Joe Bravo	Todd Pletcher	E. Paul Robsham Stables	1:50.21
2013	Successful Song	FL-6			Live Oak Plantation	1:52.28
2012	Awesome Feather	FL-4	Jeffrey Sanchez	Chad Brown	Stronach Stables	1:49.17
2011	Evening Jewel	CA-4	Victor Espinoza	James Cassidy	Tom & Marilyn Braly	1:42.25
2010	Sweet Repent	FL-4	Manoel Cruz	J. David Braddy	Buongiorno A Tutti Stable	1:49.26
2009	Leah's Secret	FL-6	Eibar Coa	Todd Pletcher	WinStar Farm	1:42.58
2008	Ginger Punch	FL-5	Rafael Bejarano	Robert J. Frankel	Stronach Stables	1:49.14
2007	Joint Effort	FL-4	Eddie Castro	Dale L. Romans	Donald Dizney	1:43.36
2006	House of Fortune	CA-5	Pat Valenzuela	Ron McAnally	Arnold Zetcher, LLC.	1:49.33
2005	Sweet Lips	FL-4	René R. Douglas	Robert J. Frankel	West Stables, Inc.	1:42.64
2004	Secret Request	FL-4	Eibar Coa	David Brownlee	JD Farms	1:45.16
2003	Smok'n Frolic	FL-4	Jerry Bailey	Todd Pletcher	Dogwood Stable	1:43.40
