= Sunshine Millions Filly & Mare Sprint =

The Sunshine Millions Filly & Mare Sprint is an American race for thoroughbred horses held in January at Santa Anita Park in Arcadia, California or at Gulfstream Park in Hallandale Beach, Florida as part of the eight-race Sunshine Millions series. Half the eight races of the Sunshine Millions are run at one track and half at the other.

Open to fillies (younger than 5 years) and mares (5 years and older) willing to race six furlongs on the dirt, the Sunshine Millions Fillies & Mares Sprint is a restricted stakes carrying a purse of $150,000.

In its 15th running in 2017, the series of races called the Sunshine Millions is restricted to horses bred in Florida or California and is the brainchild of the Thoroughbred Owners of California, the California Thoroughbred Breeders Association, the Florida Thoroughbred Breeders' and Owners’ Association, Inc., Santa Anita Park, Gulfstream Park, and Magna Entertainment Corp.

== Winners ==
Year	Winner	B–A	Jockey	Trainer	Owner	Time
2014	Ullapool	FL-5	Jose Lezcano	Eddie Kenneally	Kenneally/Detampel	1:10.41
2013	Golden Mystery	FL-7	Luis Saez	Martin D. Wolfson	Dacosta & Pinchin	1:11.07
2012	It's Me Mom	FL-4	Willie Martinez	Lynne Scace	Thomas & Jean Bosch	1:08.85
2011	Aegean	FL-4	Jeffrey Sanchez	Wesley A. Ward	Steven Michael Bell	1:09.61
2010	Quisisana	CA-5	Rafael Bejarano	Mike Puype	Ran Jan Racing	1:08.47
2009	High Resolve	FL-4	Robby Albarado	Greg Gilchrist	Estate of Harry J. Aleo	1:10.55
2008	Dearest Trickski	FL-4	Mike E. Smith	John W. Sadler	Tom Mankiewicz	1:07.66
2007	Shaggy Mane	CA-4	Mark Guidry	Donald Chatlos Jr.	IEAH Stables et al.	1:09.31
2006	Hot Storm	FL-4	David R. Flores	Dallas Stewart	Robert A. Adams	1:09.44
2005	Alix M	FL-5	Cornelio Velásquez	Ronald B. Spatz	Seven Oaks Farm	1:10.40
2004	Mooji Moo	FL-5	Corey Nakatani	Timothy Hills	Robert Deckert	1:09.34
2003	Madame Pietra	FL-6	Pat Valenzuela	Howard Zucker	Carl T. Grether	1:10.22
