= Sunshine Millions Sprint =

The Sunshine Millions Sprint is a race for thoroughbred horses held in January at Santa Anita Park in Arcadia, California or at Gulfstream Park in Hallandale Beach, Florida. Half the eight races of the Sunshine Millions are run at one track and half at the other.

Open to four-year-olds and older willing to race six furlongs on the dirt, the Sunshine Millions Sprint is an ungraded stakes event but currently carries a purse of $150,000. This race is also known as the Padua Stables Sprint (in 2006) as part of the eight-race Sunshine Millions series.

In its 17th running in 2017, the series of races called the Sunshine Millions are restricted to horses bred either in Florida or in California and is the brainchild of the Thoroughbred Owners of California, the California Thoroughbred Breeders Association, the Florida Thoroughbred Breeders’ and Owners’ Association, Inc., Santa Anita Park, Gulfstream Park, and Magna Entertainment Corporation.

== Past winners ==
- 2016 - X Y Jet (Emisael Jaramillo)
- 2015 - Weekend Hideaway (Javier Castellano)
- 2014 - Ribo Bobo (Paco Lopez)
- 2013 - Off the Jak (Fla-bred)
- 2012 - Soaring Stocks (Fla-bred) (John Velazquez)
- 2011 - Amazombie (Cal-bred) (Mike E. Smith)
- 2010 - This Ones for Phil (Fla-bred) (John Velazquez)
- 2009 - Georgie Boy (Cal-bred) (Garrett Gomez)
- 2008 - Benny the Bull (Fla-bred) (Edgar Prado) (Richard E. Dutrow, Jr.)
- 2007 - Smokey Stover (Fla-bred) (Aaron Gryder)
- 2006 - Bordonaro (Cal-bred) (Pat Valenzuela)
- 2005 - Red Warrior (Cal-bred) (Garrett Gomez)
- 2004 - Shake You Down (Fla-bred) (Mike Luzzi)
- 2003 - Captain Squire (Fla-bred) (Alex Solis)
