= Pat Valenzuela =

American jockey

Patrick Valenzuela
Personal information
- Born: October 17, 1962 (age 63) Montrose, Colorado, United States
- Occupation: Jockey

Horse racing career
- Sport: Horse racing
- Career wins: 4,000+ (ongoing)

Major racing wins
- Del Mar Oaks (1980); Santa Anita Derby (1980, 1989); San Juan Capistrano Handicap (1981, 1989, 1992); Vanity Handicap (1981, 1991); Spinster Stakes (1982, 1992); Strub Stakes (1983, 1987, 1989, 2006); Santa Anita Handicap (1984, 1993); Santa Anita Oaks (1985, 1993); Kentucky Oaks (1985); Oak Leaf Stakes (1985); Santa Maria Handicap (1985, 2003); Secretariat Stakes (1989); Super Derby (1989); American Derby (1990); Best Pal Stakes (1990, 2003, 2010); Del Mar Futurity (1990, 2010); Arlington Handicap (1991); Clement L. Hirsch Handicap (1991, 1992, 2011); Hawthorne Handicap (1991, 2002); Metropolitan Handicap (1991); Pacific Classic Stakes (1991, 2011); Arlington-Washington BC Lassie Stakes (1992); Del Mar Handicap (1992, 1994, 1996); Beverly D. Stakes (2002); Yellow Ribbon Stakes (2002, 2003); Sunshine Millions Fillies & Mares Sprint (2003); Santa Margarita Invitational Handicap (2003, 2005); Del Mar Breeders' Cup Mile (2003, 2005); Will Rogers Stakes (2004); Hollywood Gold Cup (2005); Sunshine Millions Distaff (2006); Sunshine Millions Sprint (2006) International race wins: Queen's Plate (2005); Woodbine Mile (2006) American Classics / Breeders' Cup wins: Kentucky Derby (1989); Preakness Stakes (1989); Breeders' Cup Juvenile Fillies (1986, 1992); Breeders' Cup Sprint (1987); Breeders' Cup Juvenile (1991); Breeders' Cup Turf (1992); Breeders' Cup Mile (1991); Breeders' Cup Distaff (2003)

Racing awards
- George Woolf Memorial Jockey Award (1982)

Significant horses
- Arazi, Sunday Silence, Bertrando, Best Pal; Opening Verse, Fraise, Lava Man
- Updated on March 30, 2007

Patrick Angel Valenzuela (born October 17, 1962) is an American thoroughbred horse racing jockey. Born into a racing family, his father plus three of his uncles, including Ismael Valenzuela, were jockeys. He rode his first career winner on November 10, 1978, at Sunland Park Racetrack in Sunland Park, New Mexico. In 1980, 17-year-old Pat Valenzuela became the youngest jockey to ever win the Santa Anita Derby. He was voted the George Woolf Memorial Jockey Award by his peers in 1982.

Pat Valenzuela has repeatedly said throughout his career that the best horse he has ever ridden was Arazi.

In 1989 Pat Valenzuela won the Kentucky Derby and Preakness Stakes aboard Sunday Silence but lost his chance to capture the American Triple Crown when he was beat by Easy Goer in the Belmont Stakes.

Pat Valenzuela is a seven-time winner of Breeders' Cup races. In 1992, he became the first jockey to win two Breeders' Cup races twice on the same card.

During his career, Valenzuela has dealt with a drug abuse problem that many observers believe prevented his natural talents from making him one of the greatest of jockeys in racing. During the 1990s, he was suspended by racing authorities eight times and in 2000 another suspension kept him out of racing for 22 months. Problems emerged again in January 2004 that resulted in suspension but he came back to win top jockey honors during the 2004-2005 racing season at Santa Anita Park. In 2005, he rode Wild Desert to victory for trainer Robert Frankel in the Queen's Plate, Canada's most important horse race.

Valenzuela's conditional California license, which stipulated many conditions including drug testing, was suspended once in 2006 and twice in 2007 for violations. The CHRB Stewards 'permanently' revoked Valenzuela's CA license in early 2008 after a drunk driving arrest. Stewards said then that he would not be able to reapply in the state of California. Louisiana still allowed Patrick to ride so he was able to use some time there and in Canada to get his career back on track.

On October 9, 2008, at Louisiana Downs in Bossier City, Louisiana, Pat Valenzuela rode his 4,000th winner.

On July 22, 2010, the CHRB Stewards granted Patrick Valenzuela another conditional thoroughbred license, whose conditions include thrice weekly AA meetings, submission to random and for cause drug tests and must completely abstain from the possession, injection or consumption of all mood-altering drugs, including alcohol. Tom Knust, Patrick's agent, has insisted that he has been clean since May 2008, which was confirmed by Louisiana stewards as Valenzuela never failed a random drug test there.

Since his return to California racing he won the G1 $1 Million Pacific Classic at Del Mar aboard Acclamation, 20 years after winning the same race aboard Best Pal. He also won the G1 Shoemaker Mile with Courageous Cat and three more graded stakes from 10 stakes wins going into the 2011 Breeders' Cup.

On Thursday, November 10, 2011, Patrick Valenzuela was a no-call no-show to ride his mounts at Hollywood Park. His agent could not get a hold of him all day long and stewards removed Valenzuela from his mounts. The next day, Patrick called Knust and told him that he had gone to see his fiancée and was afraid to leave her for her own well-being. Other than saying it was a personal issue which takes precedence, he gave no further explanation, except he must travel with his fiancée to Kansas. CA stewards have taken him off all mounts until, and only until, Valenzuela meets with the stewards, provides proof of his whereabouts and consents to a drug test. The earliest he may begin riding is November 26 but may not be returning until early December.

After passing a drug test to prove that his recent absence was not a slip back into his old lifestyle, on December 9, 2011, 49-year-old Champion Thoroughbred Jockey, Patrick Valenzuela, announced his retirement after a 33-year-long career. He cited his recent emergency gal bladder surgery, weight maintenance issues and knee injuries as reasons for his retirement.

On April 12, 2012, Patrick Valenzuela announced through his agent, Tom Knust, that he will return to the jockey colony at Hollywood Park, riding on April 26, the first day of the Hollywood Park meet. In June 2012, Valenzuela won the Charles Whittingham Memorial Handicap at Betfair Hollywood aboard Acclamation, who was undefeated in 2012.

== Year-end charts ==
Chart (2002–present)	Peak position
National Earnings List for Jockeys 2002	7
National Earnings List for Jockeys 2003	5
National Earnings List for Jockeys 2005	8
National Earnings List for Jockeys 2006	14
National Earnings List for Jockeys 2010	39
National Earnings List for Jockeys 2011	30
