= Jimmy Durante Stakes =

- Class: Grade III
- Location: Del Mar Racetrack; Del Mar, California, United States
- Inaugurated: 1990 (as Miesque Stakes at Hollywood Park Racetrack)
- Race type: Thoroughbred - Flat racing
- Website: Del Mar

Race information
- Distance: 1 mile
- Surface: Turf
- Track: Left-handed
- Qualification: Two-year-old fillies
- Weight: 124 lbs. with allowances
- Purse: $100,000 (since 2015)

The Jimmy Durante Stakes is a Grade III American Thoroughbred horse race for two-year-old fillies over a distance of one mile on the turf track scheduled annually in November at Del Mar Racetrack in Del Mar, California. The event currently carries a purse of $100,000.

== History ==
The event was inaugurated on 19 December 1990 as the Miesque Stakes at Hollywood Park Racetrack as a race for three year old fillies over a distance of 1 1/16 miles and was won by Dead Heat in a time of 1:41 flat. The following year the event was restricted to two-year-old fillies and the distance was decreased to one mile.

The event was named in honor of the mare Miesque, who won the Breeders' Cup Mile twice and was the United States Champion Female Turf Horse in 1987 and 1988.

In 1995, the event was classified as Grade III.

The 2005 edition of the Miesque Stakes had to be canceled because the newly planted Hollywood Park's turf course had failed to root properly.

When Hollywood Park closed in 2013, the race was renamed in honor of the actor Jimmy Durante as part of a Del Mar rebranding initiative to evoke "old Hollywood cool".

== Records ==
Speed record:

- 1:34.30 - Antespend (1995)

Margins:

- 3 1/2 lengths – Here's to You (1998)

Most wins by a Jockey:

- 3 - Eddie Delahoussaye (1991, 1996, 1998)
- 3 - Corey Nakatani (1993, 2001, 2004)

Most wins by a trainer:

- 4 - Robert J. Frankel (1992, 1997, 2000, 2004)

Most wins by an Owner

- 2 - Agri-Harvest (1997, 2000)
- 2 - Godolphin Racing (2018, 2019)

== Winners ==
Year	Winner	Jockey	Trainer	Owner	Distance	Time	Purse	Grade	Ref
At Del Mar – Jimmy Durante Stakes
2025	Just Aloof	Hector I. Berrios	Chad C. Brown	Whisper Hill Farm	1 mile	1:36.78	$103,000	III	
2024	Will Then	Vincent Cheminaud	Jonathan Thomas	Augustin Stable	1 mile	1:36.46	$103,000	III	
2023	Zona Verde (IRE)	Juan J. Hernandez	Philip D'Amato	Benowitz Family Trust, CYBT, McLean Racing Stables & Michael Nentwig	1 mile	1:36.02	$102,500	III	
2022	Liguria	Flavien Prat	Chad C. Brown	Alpha Delta Stables	1 mile	1:36.16	$103,500	III	
2021	Tezzaray (GB)	Irad Ortiz Jr.	Peter Miller	Slam Dunk Racing & Roger H. Newman	1 mile	1:37.56	$103,000	III	
2020	Fluffy Socks	Irad Ortiz Jr.	Chad C. Brown	Head Of Plains Partners	1 mile	1:35.35	$102,500	III	
2019	Alms	Paco Lopez	Michael Stidham	Godolphin Racing	1 mile	1:36.01	$102,106	III	
2018	Elsa	Joe Bravo	Michael Stidham	Godolphin Racing	1 mile	1:35.68	$102,415	III	
2017	Daddy Is a Legend	Joe Bravo	George Weaver	Jim & Susan Hill	1 mile	1:36.06	$102,415	III	
2016	Journey Home	Drayden Van Dyke	H. Graham Motion	Sam-Son Farm	1 mile	1:38.24	$102,760	III	
2015	Family Meeting	Drayden Van Dyke	Thomas F. Proctor	Glen Hill Farm	1 mile	1:37.14	$101,750	III	
2014	Ol' Fashion Gal	Joseph Talamo	Mark E. Casse	Bill & Vicki Poston	1 mile	1:37.27	$151,500	III	
At Hollywood Park – Miesque Stakes
2013	Full Ransom	Victor Espinoza	James M. Cassidy	Deron Pearson	1 mile	1:37.51	$100,250	III	
2012	Travesura	Tyler Baze	Jeff Mullins	Val-U-Chem	1 mile	1:37.01	$100,000	III	
2011	More Than Love	Ramon A. Dominguez	John P. Terranova II	Newtown Anner Stud Farm	1 mile	1:36:32	$100,000	III	
2010	Neversaidiwassweet	Rafael Bejarano	Jerry Hollendorfer	Red Oak Stable	1 mile	1:35.88	$100,000	III	
2009	The Mailet	Joel Rosario	Bruce N. Levine	J. W. Singer, LLC	1 mile	1:35.05	$100,000	III	
2008	Habaya	Richard Migliore	Kiaran P. McLaughlin	Shadwell Farm	1 mile	1:37.07	$113,800	III	
2007	Sea Chanter	Mike E. Smith	Todd A. Pletcher	Stonerside Stable	1 mile	1:35.84	$113,200	III	
2006	Valbenny (IRE)	Alex O. Solis	Patrick Gallagher	LGL Racing, Rita DiPietro, Michael Rosenmayer et al.	1 mile	1:36.58	$100,000	III	
2005	Race not held								
2004	Louvain (IRE)	Ramon A. Dominguez	Robert J. Frankel	Edmund A. Gann	1 mile	1:37.19	$75,000	III	Division 1
2004	Paddy's Daisy	Corey Nakatani	Todd A. Pletcher	Stonehaven Farm	1 mile	1:36.92	$75,000	III	Division 2
2003	Mambo Slew	Mike E. Smith	Patrick L. Biancone	Frank Manganaro	1 mile	1:36.17	$100,000	III	
2002	§ Atlantic Ocean	David R. Flores	Bob Baffert	The Thoroughbred Corporation	1 mile	1:34.63	$200,000	III	
2001	Forty On Line (GB)	Corey Nakatani	Robert B. Hess Jr.	Jack Cohen, Michael Sigband, Rich Ulmer et al.	1 mile	1:36.38	$200,000	III	
2000	Fantastic Filly (FR)	Garrett K. Gomez	Robert J. Frankel	Agri-Harvest	1 mile	1:35.11	$200,000	III	
1999	Prairie Princess	Alex O. Solis	Linda L. Rice	Clyde D. Rice	1 mile	1:37.30	$200,000	III	
1998	Here's to You	Eddie Delahoussaye	Simon Magnier	Sally Stacey	1 mile	1:36.57	$200,000	III	
1997	Star's Proud Penny	Garrett K. Gomez	Robert J. Frankel	Agri-Harvest	1 mile	1:37.42	$200,000	III	
1996	Ascutney	Eddie Delahoussaye	David G. Donk	December Hill Farm	1 mile	1:35.16	$200,000	III	
1995	§ Antespend	Chris Antley	Ron McAnally	Jack Kent Cooke	1 mile	1:34.30	$200,000	III	
1994	Bail Out Becky	Kent J. Desormeaux	William I. Mott	Kenneth L. Ramsey	1 mile	1:37.26	$200,000	Listed	
1993	Tricky Code	Corey Nakatani	Gary F. Jones	Kallenberg Thoroughbred	1 mile	1:35.15	$250,000	Listed	
1992	Creaking Board (GB)	Kent J. Desormeaux	Robert J. Frankel	Patrizio Cozzi	1 mile	1:35.62	$250,000	Listed	
1991	More Than Willing	Eddie Delahoussaye	Rodney Rash	Robert E. Hibbert	1 mile	1:35.51	$112,500	Listed	Division 1
1991	Hopeful Amber	David R. Flores	Lewis A. Cenicola	Margaret Elardi	1 mile	1:36.72	$112,500	Listed	Division 2
1990	Dead Heat	Julio A. Garcia	John K. Dolan	Larry S. Smith	1 1/16 miles	1:41.00	$60,000		3YO fillies

Legend:
Dirt Turf
Notes:
§ Ran as an entry

== See also ==
- List of American and Canadian Graded races
