= Star Over The Bay =

American-bred Thoroughbred racehorse

- Sire: Cozzene
- Grandsire: Caro
- Dam: Lituva Bay
- Damsire: Empery
- Sex: Gelding
- Foaled: 1998
- Country: United States
- Colour: Gray
- Breeder: Four Horsemen's Ranch
- Owner: G. Racing
- Trainer: Mike R. Mitchell
- Record: 42: 10-4-3
- Earnings: US$917,353

Major wins
- Clement L. Hirsch Turf Championship Stakes (2004); Del Mar Handicap (2004); Sunset Handicap (2004); Sunshine Millions Turf (2005)

Star Over The Bay (foaled February 5, 1998, in Florida - died in Singapore on May 15, 2005) was a Thoroughbred racehorse who rose from the claimer ranks and earned more than $700,000.

In early 2004, at age five, the light gray was claimed at Hollywood Park. Under the guidance of new trainer Mike Mitchell, he soon won three consecutive graded turf races, including the 2004 Grade II Sunset Handicap in a wire-to-wire effort. Star Over The Bay's biggest win came in the January 2005 running of the Sunshine Millions Turf at Santa Anita Park under Eclipse Award-winning jockey Tyler Baze.

On May 15, 2005, at age seven, Star Over The Bay fractured his right foreleg (sesamoid). He was near the front of the field at the half mile pole in the Grade I US$1.8 million (SGD $3 million) Singapore Airlines International Cup at Kranji Racecourse when he broke down. He was humanely euthanized on the track. Mitchell said: "I saw Tyler pulling him up and didn't realize how bad it was until he came back crying. If I could have just brought him back and retired him, I would feel so much better."
