= Sunshine Millions Turf Stakes =

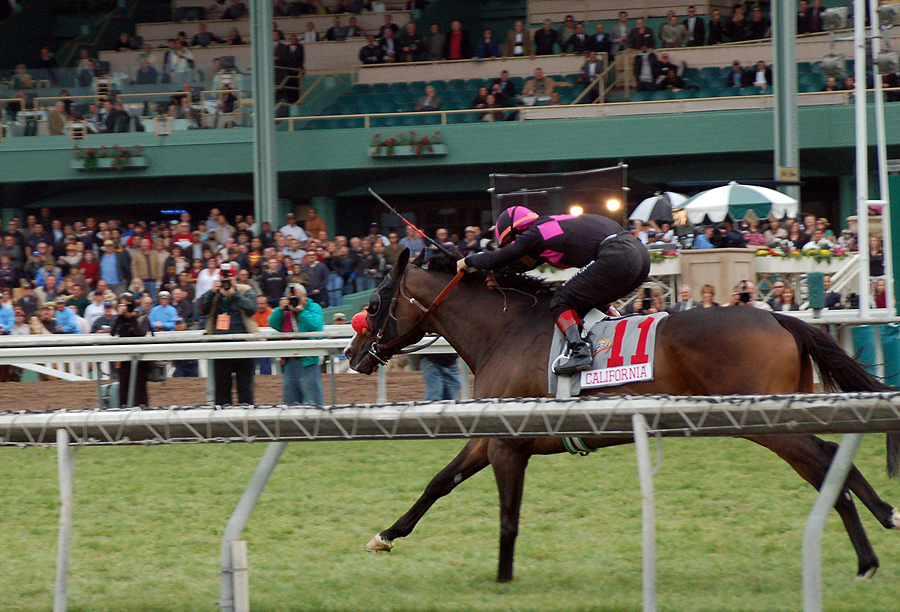
Lava Man (with jockey Corey Nakatani) about to cross the finish line to take 1st place in the 2007 Sunshine Millions Turf Stakes.

The Sunshine Millions Turf Stakes is a race for thoroughbred horses held in January at Santa Anita Park in Arcadia, California or at Gulfstream Park in Hallandale Beach, Florida. Half the eight races of the Sunshine Millions are run at one track and half at the other.

Open to four-year-olds and older willing to race one and one/eighth miles on the turf, the Sunshine Millions Turf is an ungraded stakes event but currently carries a purse of $75,000. This race is also known as the Cloverleaf Farms Turf (in 2006) as part of the eight-race Sunshine Millions series.

In its 14th running in 2015, the series of races called the Sunshine Millions are restricted to horses bred either in Florida or in California and is the brainchild of the Thoroughbred Owners of California, the California Thoroughbred Breeders’ Association, the Florida Thoroughbred Breeders’ and Owners’ Association, Inc., Santa Anita Park, Gulfstream Park, and Magna Entertainment Corporation.

== Past winners ==
- 2022 – Lure Him In (Junior Alvarado)
- 2018 – Galleon Mast ( Irad Ortiz, Jr.)
- 2017 – Our Way (John Velazquaz)
- 2016 – Manchurian High (Luis Saez)
- 2015 – Manchurian High (Luis Saez)
- 2014 – Star Channel (Fla-bred)
- 2013 – Teaks North (Fla-bred)
- 2012 – Little Mike (Fla-bred) (Joe Bravo)
- 2011 – Caracortado (Cal-bred) (Joe Talamo)
- 2010 – Jet Propulsion (Fla-bred) (Julien Leparoux)
- 2009 – Soldier's Dancer (Fla-bred) (Rafael Bejarano) (Presious Passion placed.)
- 2008 – War Monger (Fla-bred) (Kent Desormeaux)
- 2007 – Lava Man (Cal-bred) (Corey Nakatani)
- 2006 – Miesque's Approval (Fla-bred) (Eddie Castro)
- 2005 – Star Over The Bay (Fla-bred) (Tyler Baze)
- 2004 – Proud Man (Fla-bred) (René R. Douglas)
- 2003 – Adminniestrator (Cal-bred) (Martin Pedroza)
