= Martin A. Pedroza =

Jockey (born 1965)

Martin Pedroza
Personal information
- Born: July 20, 1965 (age 61) Panama City, Panama
- Occupation: Jockey

Horse racing career
- Sport: Horse racing
- Career wins: 3,346 (ongoing)

Major racing wins
- Los Angeles Handicap (1983); Graduation Stakes (1989); Santa Anita Handicap (1989); Landaluce Stakes (1990, 1991, 1992, 1996); Chula Vista Handicap (1991); Hoist The Flag Stakes (1991); Honeymoon Handicap (1991); Las Flores Handicap (1991); Sorority Stakes (1991); A Gleam Handicap (1992); Morvich Handicap (1992); Santa Paula Stakes (1992); California Breeders' Champion Stakes (1993); San Simeon Handicap (1993, 2008); Sunshine Millions Turf Stakes (2003); Texas Mile Stakes (2003); Ancient Title Stakes (1994); San Miguel Stakes (1994, 2003); Del Mar Debutante Stakes (1995); Hutcheson Stakes (1995); El Camino Real Derby (1996); Haggin Stakes (1998); Westchester Stakes (1998); Native Diver Handicap (2004); San Gabriel Handicap (2004); Bayakoa Handicap (2005); John C. Mabee Handicap (2005); Real Quiet Stakes (2005); Cinema Handicap (2006); Hawthorne Handicap (2006); San Antonio Handicap (2006); San Francisco Mile Stakes (2006); San Luis Obispo Handicap (2006); Santa Maria Handicap (2006); Cougar II Handicap (2007); Del Mar Derby (2007); Affirmed Handicap (2008); Daytona Handicap (2008); Lazaro Barrera Memorial Stakes (2008); Triple Bend Invitational Handicap (2010); Tokyo City Cup (2011); Cigar Mile Handicap (2014)

Racing awards
- Leading apprentice jockey at Santa Anita (1983); Leading apprentice jockey at Oak Tree (1983); Leading apprentice jockey at Los Alimitos (1983); Leading jockey at Fairplex Park (1989, 1999-2010); Leading jockey at Hollywood Park (Fall, 2005)

Honours
- Fairplex Park Hall of Fame (2009)

Significant horses
- Martial Law

Martin A. Pedroza (born July 20, 1965, in Panama City, Panama) is a jockey in American Thoroughbred horse racing.

Pedroza trained at the Panama jockey school and in 1981 rode his first winner at Hipódromo Presidente Remón in Panama City. He emigrated to California for the 1983 racing season where he won more races than any other apprentice jockey during three meets at Santa Anita Park, Oak Tree and Los Alamitos. He is considered one of the best jockeys of all time.

== Major racing accomplishments ==
Martin Pedroza won six consecutive races at Santa Anita Park on October 31, 1992, equaling that track's record held by Steve Valdez in 1973 and matched by Darrel McHargue in 1979 and by Laffit Pincay Jr. in 1987 and Patrick Valenzuela in 1988. Of the four record holders, only Pedroza earned his wins in successive races. In 2008, he won his 3000th career race at Fairplex Park on a day when he won a record seven races then followed up with another seven-race win day just two days later.

At the 2005 Hollywood Park 2005 fall meet, Martin Pedroza won more races than any other jockey and in 2010 he won his thirteenth riding title at Fairplex Park, twelve of which have been consecutive since 1999. Pedroza's longtime agent is Richie Silverstein

On May 13, 2021, at Churchill Downs, Martin Pedroza rode his last race, having won 3,911 during his career. A resident of Duarte, California, he stayed in the business as an exercise jockey and voluntary advisor to young riders.

=== Year-end charts ===
Chart (2000–present)	Peak position
National Earnings List for Jockeys 2000	63
National Earnings List for Jockeys 2001	66
National Earnings List for Jockeys 2002	83
National Earnings List for Jockeys 2003	56
National Earnings List for Jockeys 2004	63
National Earnings List for Jockeys 2005	37
National Earnings List for Jockeys 2006	42
National Earnings List for Jockeys 2007	59
National Earnings List for Jockeys 2008	62
National Earnings List for Jockeys 2010	67
National Earnings List for Jockeys 2011	42
National Earnings List for Jockeys 2012	47
National Earnings List for Jockeys 2013	52
National Earnings List for Jockeys 2015	62
