= Sunshine Millions =

- Location: Hallandale Beach, Florida
- Owned by: Stronach Group
- Date opened: 2002
- Course type: Flat
- Notable races: Sunshine Millions Classic; Sunshine Millions Turf Stakes; Sunshine Millions Distaff; Sunshine Millions Filly & Mare Turf; Sunshine Millions Sprint; Sunshine Millions Turf Sprint

The Sunshine Millions is a series of American races for thoroughbred horses held in January at Santa Anita Park in Arcadia, California or at Gulfstream Park in Hallandale Beach, Florida. The brainchild of prominent horseman Frank Stronach, when it first began, half of the eight Sunshine Millions races are run at one track and half at the other. Beginning in 2012, the revamped version of the Sunshine Millions feature six races at Gulfstream Park in Hallandale Beach, Florida, exclusively for Florida-breds, with a combined purse of $1.3 million. The series now consists of the:

1. Sunshine Millions Classic
2. Sunshine Millions Turf Stakes
3. Sunshine Millions Distaff
4. Sunshine Millions Filly & Mare Turf
5. Sunshine Millions Sprint
6. Sunshine Millions Turf Sprint

The series originally consisted of the:

1. Sunshine Millions Oaks
2. Sunshine Millions Dash
3. Sunshine Millions Distaff
4. Sunshine Millions Filly & Mare Sprint
5. Sunshine Millions Sprint
6. Sunshine Millions Filly & Mare Turf
7. Sunshine Millions Turf Stakes
8. Sunshine Millions Classic
