= Lava Man =

American-bred Thoroughbred racehorse

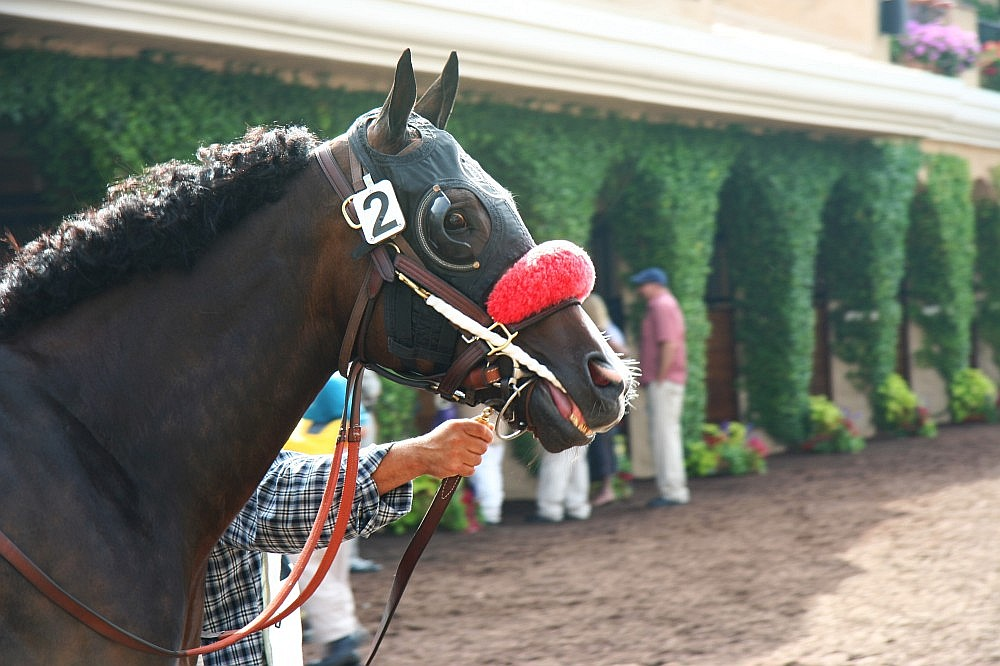
- Lava Man in 2006 Pacific Classic
- Sire: Slew City Slew
- Grandsire: Seattle Slew
- Dam: L'il Ms. Leonard
- Damsire: Nostalgia's Star
- Sex: Gelding
- Foaled: 2001
- Country: USA
- Colour: Dark Bay
- Breeder: Lonnie Arterburn, Eve Kuhlmann, Kim Kuhlmann
- Owner: Arterburn and Kuhlmann; STD Racing Stable/Jason Wood
- Trainer: Lonnie Arterburn; Doug O'Neill
- Record: 47:17-8-5
- Earnings: $5,268,706

Major wins
- Californian Stakes (2005); Hollywood Gold Cup (2005, 2006, 2007); Sunshine Millions Classic (2006); Santa Anita Handicap (2006, 2007); Khaled Stakes (2006); Charles Whittingham Memorial Handicap (2006); Pacific Classic Stakes (2006); Goodwood Breeders' Cup Handicap (2006); Sunshine Millions Turf (2007)

Awards
- California Bred Champion Older Horse (2005, 2006, 2007); California Horse of the Year (2005, 2006); California Bred Champion Turf Horse (2006)

Honors
- United States Racing Hall of Fame inductee (2015)

Lava Man (foaled on March 20, 2001) is an American-bred Thoroughbred racehorse who was once claimed for $50,000 but wound up being inducted into the National Museum of Racing and Hall of Fame in 2015. In a forty-seven race career, despite finishing off the board while losing all 5 of his races outside California, he won seventeen times with his major victories including three Hollywood Gold Cups, two Santa Anita Handicaps, and the Pacific Classic Stakes.

== Background ==
Lava Man is dark bay thoroughbred gelding with a white blaze on his forehead. His dam L'il Ms. Leonard was claimed by Lonnie Arterburn for $16,000 and then sent to Kentucky to be bred to Slew City Slew, a son of Triple Crown winner Seattle Slew. Kim and Eve Kuhlman acquired a half interest in L'il Ms. Leonard and kept her at their farm in Kentucky before shipping her back to California. Lava Man was foaled on March 20, 2001, at Poplar Meadows Ranch near Sanger, California. He originally ran as a homebred for Arterburn and the Kuhlmans, and was trained by Arterburn.

Eve Kuhlmann, who competes in triathlons, named the horse Lava Man for a triathlon on the Big Island in Hawaii.

Lava Man is known for both his intelligent and friendly personality and his "tenacity, courage and adaptability" on the track. A jockey who regularly rode Lava Man, Corey Nakatani, has said of him, "This horse has gears, so many gears. What a horse. He's just about unbelievable."

== Racing career ==
=== Early career ===
Lava Man first raced as a 2-year-old in a $12,500 maiden claiming race at the San Joaquin County Fair in June 2003, finishing fourth and earning a paltry Beyer Speed Figure of 27. The Fair Circuit is the lowest level of thoroughbred competition in California thoroughbred racing. Arterburn said he was a big, long-striding horse that never got tired. "But he was so laid back he could be a pony. He didn't show anything in the mornings. I took him out to Stockton, California to get him a race, make him eligible for starter allowances and not get him claimed away." In the words of Daily Racing Form columnist Dick Jerardi, "Lava Man did not start his career on the other side of the tracks. He started his career in a place [Stockton] where there are no tracks."

Lava Man lost his next two races before Arterburn tried him on the grass. The horse won for the first time on November 29, 2003, at Golden Gate Fields, then followed up with an allowance race win in January 2004. He then lost his next four races, shipping between Santa Anita, Bay Meadows and Hollywood Park, before earning his third win after Arterburn removed his blinkers. Arterburn then entered him in a $62,500 claiming race at Del Mar Racetrack because, as he said, "We had no other place to run him so we took him south. It was the usual Northern California problem." He came in sixth, so in his next race, Arterburn dropped him down a notch in a $50,000 claiming race on August 13. In that race, Lava Man was claimed by Doug O'Neill for owner Steve Kenly, who was looking for a useful California-bred for his STD Stables. "I never should have run him back down there," said Arterburn. "You go down to that claiming pit at Del Mar and you're asking for trouble. They claim crazy down there, and I never should have taken him there. I really liked the horse. He had a great personality; almost a clown. He was like a big kid, always wanting attention. He was a one of a kind character, and we tried to protect him the best we could."

Now racing for O'Neill, Lava Man won the Derby Trial Stakes at Fairplex, then finished third in the Pomono Derby. O'Neill initially kept the horse on turf, but then moved him back to dirt where he finished second in three straight races, including a promising performance behind Rock Hard Ten in the Grade 1 Malibu Stakes. Lava Man finished his three-year-old season with three wins and six seconds from thirteen starts.

=== 2005 ===
At the start of his 2005 campaign, Lava Man was badly beaten in his first three starts, finishing seventh, fifth and sixth, with one of these being the Sunshine Millions Classic at Gulfstream Park in Florida. O'Neill re-fitted the horse with blinkers, then entered him in a $100,000 claiming race in May. Lava Man won but was not claimed as Arterburn lacked the funds to do so at the time. Arterburn would later call Lava Man "the best and worst thing that ever happened to me" after the horse started winning major races for O'Neill. However, because California-breds winning open races in the state generate breeders' rewards worth approximately 15 percent of the purse, Arterburn continued to receive a share of some of Lava Man's earnings as his co-breeder.

On June 18, Lava Man won the Californian Stakes for his first graded stakes victory. In his next race, the $750,000 Grade 1 Hollywood Gold Cup in July, Lava Man won by a stakes-record margin of over 8 lengths and earned his career-high Beyer Speed Figure of 120 while carrying the highweight. Kenly later said, "The first Gold Cup, that was the biggest race we'd ever run in, and that was the most special because it was our first."

In August, Lava Man entered the Pacific Classic in which he led for most of the race but was caught near the wire and finished third. Despite the loss, O'Neill considered the race one of his finest efforts. "He just laid his body down – what a huge race," said O'Neill. "He was just rubber-legged, like a boxer, just no legs. He was okay. We got him back to the barn, got him drinking, got a hose on him right away, and he finally came to. But you don't see many horses run that hard to where they're rubber-legged. They usually stop miles before that happens." Lava Man was so exhausted he had to be vanned off the racetrack. "He gave us such a scare," said O'Neill. "We thought he broke down. You wanted to hug the horse even more. He gave everything he had. People don't do that and horses don't do that."

Lava Man was sent east for the Jockey Club Gold Cup at Belmont Park in New York, where he finished over 45 lengths behind in seventh place, hampered by a sore left front hoof. In late November, he went to Japan for the Japan Cup Dirt where he finished eleventh, running without Lasix for the first time. At the start of the race, Lava Man stumbled and tore the sole of his hoof. "He bled for 1 1/2 miles. We thought it was the end of him, that he was done racing," said Leandro Mora, O'Neill's assistant trainer. He finished the year with three wins from nine starts and was named the California-bred Horse of the Year and Champion Older Horse.

=== 2006 ===
Lava Man's first race of 2006 was the $1,000,000 Sunshine Millions Classic at Santa Anita Park in California on January 28, restricted to California- and Florida-bred horses. Fitted with a special shoe to help with his sore feet, he returned to form with a 2 1/2 length win. O'Neill was relieved. "If I wasn't connected to this horse, I would have said [he] had lost it," the trainer said. "But he finally ran like he had been training."

In his next race, the $1,000,000 Grade 1 Santa Anita Handicap, Lava Man faced favorite High Limit, 2005 Kentucky Derby winner Giacomo, and 2004 Breeders' Cup Juvenile Champion Wilko. He scored a "spectacular" 3/4 length victory over Magnum, who was getting 7 pounds. Because of his earlier turf form, O'Neill next entered him in the restricted Khaled Stakes at Hollywood Park Racetrack. Lava Man won easily and set a new track record of 1:44.26 for 1 1/8 miles. Keeping him on the turf, O'Neill followed up by entering the horse in the Grade 1 Charles Whittingham Memorial Handicap at Hollywood Park Racetrack. Lava Man won the 1 1/4 mile race easily after getting an unchallenged early lead. This victory made him the first horse since Eclipse Award winner Vanlandingham in 1985 to win a Grade 1 Turf and Dirt race in the same year.

Next up for Lava Man was an attempt to repeat in the Hollywood Gold Cup on July 8. Only California-bred Hall of Famer Native Diver had ever repeated in the Gold Cup, in 1965–1967. Lava Man raced out of a detention barn because O'Neil had been penalized after another horse had an excess of total carbon dioxide in a post race drug test in May. Lava Man stumbled badly at the start of the race and settled farther off the pace than he generally preferred. Nevertheless, he took the lead in mid-stretch and won by a short nose over longshot Ace Blue, who was carrying 10 pounds fewer than Lava Man. Lava Man had now won the Gold Cup by both the biggest (in 2005) and smallest (in 2006) margins in the race history.

Lava Man became the first horse since Triple Crown Winner Affirmed in 1979 to win the Santa Anita Handicap and Hollywood Gold Cup in the same year. He also became the first horse to win the Whittingham and the Gold Cup in the same year since Exceller in 1978. Lava Man earned his third straight Beyer Speed Figure of 108 in the race. Daily Racing Form columnist Dick Jerardi wrote, "[N]early 27 months after his first visit to Hollywood Park Racetrack [finishing last at 57-1 in the Snow Chief Stakes], Lava Man was 3-5 in the Grade 1 Hollywood Gold Cup. This is about as close to Seabiscuit as this sport has seen since Seabiscuit."

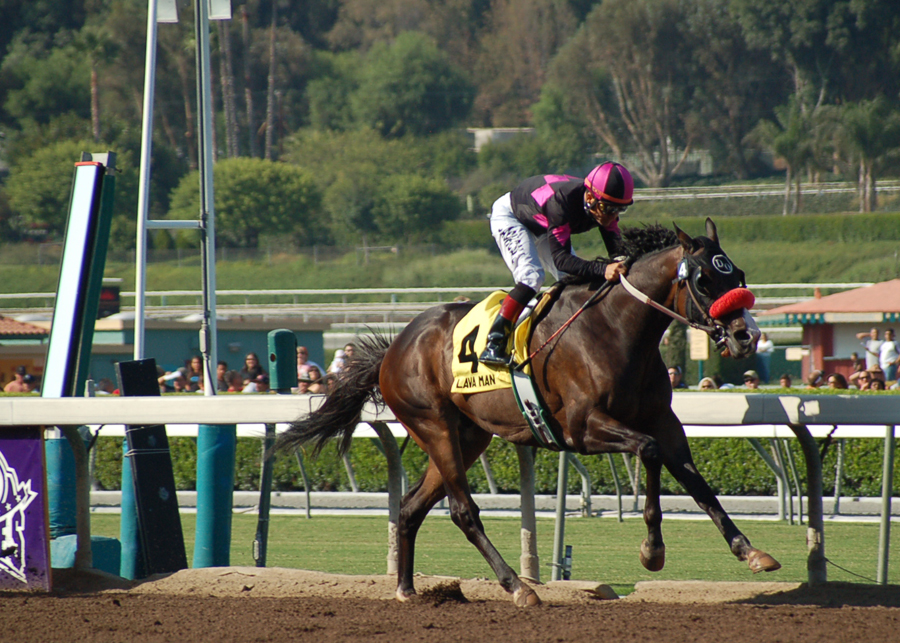
Lava Man (with jockey Corey Nakatani) after crossing the finish line to take 1st place in the 2006 Goodwood Breeder's Cup Handicap

On August 20, Lava Man won the Grade 1 Pacific Classic Stakes over a strong field of equal-weighted thoroughbreds including Giacomo, Perfect Drift, Good Reward, Super Frolic, and Magnum. By virtue of this win, he became the first horse ever to take the Grade 1 Santa Anita Handicap, the Grade 1 Hollywood Gold Cup, and the Grade 1 Pacific Classic Stakes in the same calendar year. The feat has since been matched by Game On Dude in 2013 and Accelerate in 2018. "It's incredible when you think about all the great horsemen and great horses that have run in this state", said O'Neil. In October, Lava Man won his seventh straight race, the $500,000 Goodwood Breeders' Cup Handicap, while carrying 126 lbs., 10 more lbs. than runner-up Brother Derek.

He was touted by many racing observers as a possible 2006 Horse of the Year candidate if he could beat favored Bernardini outside California in the Breeders' Cup Classic at Churchill Downs in Kentucky on November 4. However, he was never a factor in the Classic, finishing seventh after a troubled trip, well behind Bernardini and the winner, Invasor, who came from Argentina by way of Uruguay and Dubai. "I'm a little disappointed with the result, but I'm proud of how he ran and how he tried," said O'Neill.

Despite his Breeders' Cup Classic loss, Lava Man's likeness was inserted into a snowglobe given to paid admissions at Hollywood Park Racetrack in December 2006.

With seven wins (four of them Grade I) in eight starts, Lava Man was named the 2006 California-bred Horse of the Year, Champion older horse and Champion turf horse. He earned a 127 rating in the 2006 World Thoroughbred Racehorse Rankings.

=== 2007 ===
Lava Man's first start of 2007 was the $500,000 Sunshine Millions Turf at Santa Anita Park on January 27. Racing wide most of the way, he pulled away in the stretch to win by two lengths. On March 3, Lava Man earned back-to-back victories in the Santa Anita Handicap, a feat previously only accomplished by John Henry and Milwaukee Brew. In this race, he carried the topweight of 124 pounds and beat Molengao, Boboman, and 2007 Sunshine Millions Classic winner McCann's Mojave in front of 43,024 fans. He became the only horse to win two Santa Anita Handicaps and two Hollywood Gold Cups. "These are the moments we all live and work for," said O'Neill. "He's truly a champion."

Three weeks after this win, he was shipped to Dubai to compete in the $5,000,000 Dubai Duty Free Stakes over approximately 1 1/8 miles on the turf. As was his characteristic when traveling outside of California, Lava Man did not fare well. He finished last of 16 horses after he had the lead 3 furlongs from the finish line. Lava Man's career record outside California was 5 losses in all 5 races and finishing off the board in each. On returning home, O'Neill said, "I think it's reasonable to say we won't be leaving California again... We'll let him tell us how he is through the feed tub and play it by ear."

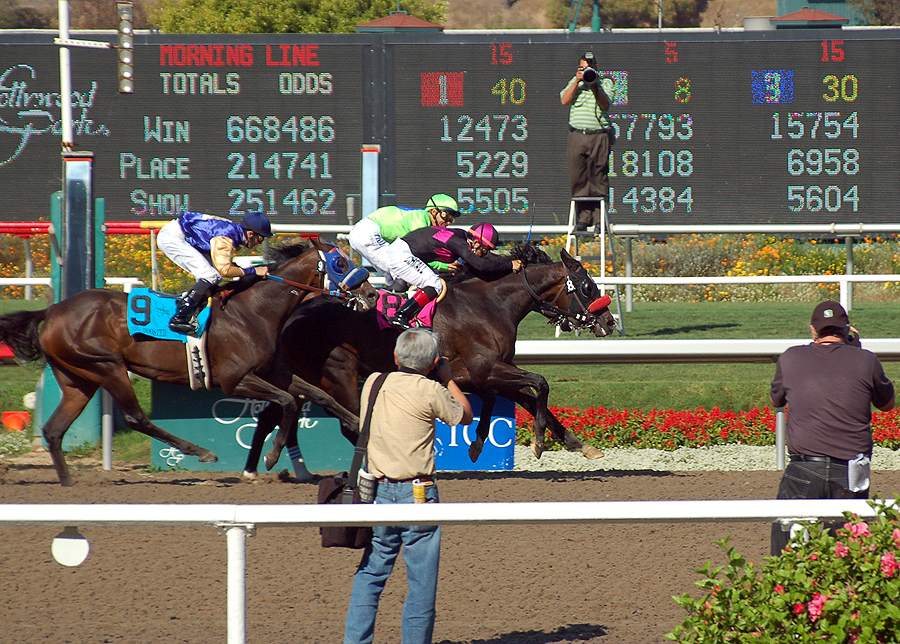
Lava Man (with jockey Corey Nakatani) after dueling with A.P. Xcellent to win the 2007 Hollywood Gold Cup

On June 11, Lava Man returned to the California race circuit with a second-place finish in the Charles Whittingham Memorial Handicap, won by After Market in the excellent time of 1:58.77, just 1/5 off the course record. His connections were pleased at the result after the layoff, especially considering Lava Man six pounds more than the winner.

On June 30, Lava Man won his third consecutive Hollywood Gold Cup, beating A.P. Xcellent by a nose after dueling down the stretch. Lava Man's third consecutive Gold Cup matched Native Diver's three-peat of 1965–1967 and set a new course record for 1 1/4 miles on the new Hollywood Park "Cushion Track" synthetic dirt surface. "He's done so much and every time he does it, you're like, 'Wow, that's crazy,' and then he does something more," said co-owner Jason Wood. "So here we sit, three-peat of the Gold Cup." With his win on cushion track, Lava Man became the first horse to win Grade 1 races on three different surfaces: conventional dirt, synthetic dirt, and turf.

After his Gold Cup win, Steve Haskin of the Blood-Horse contemplated Lava Man's failure to win outside of the state of California and called upon his owners to make another attempt at the Breeders' Cup. Haskin wrote: "Sure, it could backfire, but it's not as if Lava Man's reputation is going to suffer if it did. He'll still be the king of California. He'll still be a racing treasure. He'll still be a legend. In short, he'll still be Lava Man. And that's enough in anyone's lifetime." On July 15, 2007, Lava Man was named "Horse of the Meet" for the Hollywood Park Spring/Summer Meet for the third consecutive year.

On July 23, 2007, Lava Man's long-time groom, Noe Garcia, suffered serious injuries in an automobile accident just outside the Del Mar Racetrack, where Lava Man was stabled in preparation for the Pacific Classic Stakes. The accident left Garcia without his left arm. O'Neill said, "He's lucky to be alive and he's got a lot to live for. He's got a job with this stable forever." Some of his connections felt that the absence of Garcia contributed to Lava Man's subsequent loss of form. "Horses have sensitivity, feelings, and heart. He could have been feeling the loss, and the change in routine," said assistant trainer Mora.

On August 19, Lava Man was sent-off as the 6-5 favorite in the Pacific Classic Stakes but did not take well to Del Mar's new Polytrack racing surface and finished a well-beaten sixth. He was then pointed to the October 7 Oak Tree Mile Stakes at Santa Anita's Oak Tree meet in hopes that the shorter distance and firmer turf might benefit him. The gelding placed sixth and last, and jockey Corey Nakatani said, "There was no energy level there at all. We were sitting in a real good spot right behind the leaders, and then I can normally push the horse outside, but he just had no fight today. I don't know what the deal was."

Lava Man then went off as the favorite in the California Cup Classic at Santa Anita Park on November 3. The gelding broke well and assumed a stalking position. However, in mid stretch he again ran out of steam and placed 6th. Veterinarians at Alamo Pintado Equine Medical Center in Santa Barbara, CA, were unable to identify anything physically wrong with the horse, and O'Neill sent Lava Man to NexStar farm in Temecula, CA, for a planned several-month vacation from racing. Lava Man was also featured in an hour-plus DVD Biography offered at Hollywood Park Racetrack in December 2007 as a fundraiser for Garcia. The biography was narrated by Jim Forbes of VH1 Behind the Music fame, and was later incorporated into the TVG Racing Network's biography series Legends. He was named Champion Older Horse by the CTBA.

=== Later career and retirements ===
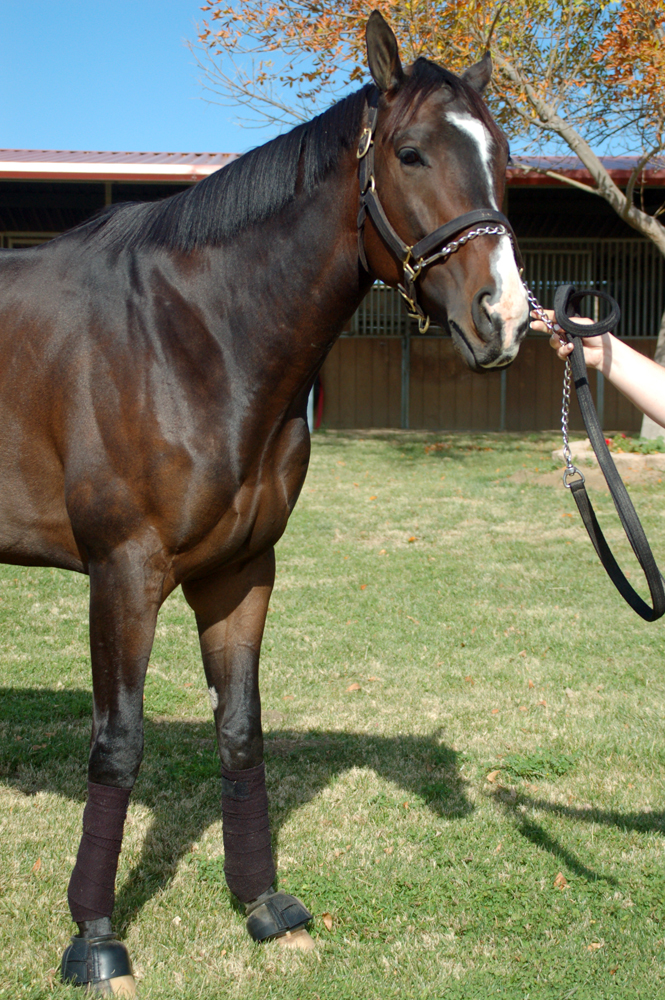
Lava Man at NexStar farm in Temecula, CA

Lava Man was again examined at the Alamo Pintado Equine Medical Center before returning to Hollywood Park on January 26, 2008. O'Neill ran Lava Man at Khaled Stakes on April 28, where he finished third. Lava Man went on to run competitively in the $300,000 Charles Whittingham Handicap at Hollywood Park on June 7, 2008, placing third, a neck behind the winner. O'Neill deemed the three-week timetable between the Whittingham and the Hollywood Gold Cup to be too short of a rest for Lava Man to make an attempt to win the race for the fourth consecutive time. The horse then started in the Grade I Eddie Read Handicap at Del Mar Racetrack on July 20, 2008, finishing sixth. Subsequent x-rays, performed at the Alamo Pintado Equine Medical Center, revealed that the gelding's front ankles showed marked changes from x-rays taken earlier in the year. Based on the veterinarian's assessment and the gelding's performance in the Eddie Read, Lava Man was retired on July 30, 2008, after having made 46 starts.

The original plan was to retire the horse to Old Friends. However, Lava Man was restless away from the racetrack so was sent back to Alamo Pintado in hopes that his physical problems could be repaired sufficiently to allow him to be used as a riding horse. Dr. Doug Herthel used stem cell therapy, which proved so successful that his connections considered a return to the racetrack.

On September 23, 2009, after Lava Man ran an official 3 furlong workout in 36 seconds flat at Hollywood Park (tied for the fastest time of the 24 horses that ran at that distance), O'Neill announced that the gelding was back in training and preparing for a comeback only if he could compete at a Grade 1 level. Lava Man's only comeback start was in the San Gabriel Handicap (Gr. IIT) at Santa Anita Park on December 27, 2009, where he finished last. It was announced on January 5, 2010, that Lava Man was retired for good. "He came out of the race sound and he is a strong and sturdy horse, but we don't want to tarnish his reputation," said Kenly. "It was his first race in a year and half and I'm sure he would improve in his next race, but I think he has lost a step. It was disappointing for all of us because he was training unbelievably."

In May 2010, O'Neill said that the horse was his stable pony and that he had become accustomed to his new role. On May 5, 2012, Lava Man served as lead pony for three-year-old colt I'll Have Another in the post parade for both the Kentucky Derby and Preakness Stakes, races which I'll Have Another subsequently won. "He's great with the young horses and happy as he can be," said O'Neill in 2015. "He's been a great asset for the team, taking the babies to and from the track."

Lava Man underwent colic surgery in July 2018. He recovered and returned to O'Neill's barn but had a second bout of colic in July 2022. On October 19, O'Neill announced that Lava Man would make his final appearance as a stable pony when leading Hot Rod Charlie to the post at the 2022 Breeders' Cup Classic. He was then retired to Old Friends. O'Neill noted, "At Team O'Neill we are extremely grateful for the 18 years we had to race and work alongside Lava Man. He can never be replaced, and we will never look to replace him."

== Legacy ==
Lava Man won 7 Grade 1 races, ranking him as the all-time leader among California-breds. He scored nine triple digit Beyer Speed Figures during his career and set two course records. His earnings of nearly $5.2 million place him third on the list of leading California-bred earners, behind Best Pal ($5,668,245) and Tiznow ($6,427,830). He and Game on Dude are the only horses to win the signature race at each of Southern California's major thoroughbred racetracks in one year, and he equaled Native Diver's record of winning three consecutive Hollywood Gold Cups. Lava Man was the first horse in a generation to win a Grade 1 race on dirt and turf in the same year, and he is the only horse to win a North American Grade 1 race on dirt, turf, and an artificial racing surface. He is the all-time leading earner among claimers and is arguably the greatest claim in racing history.

Lava Man made an appearance at the Thoroughbred Classic Horse Show held at the Rancho Mission Viejo Riding Park in order to demonstrate the versatility of retired racehorses. Handled by Sommer Smith of NexStar Ranch, he won all three classes in which he was entered – War Horse, War Horse Showmanship, and Spirit of a Winner.

On April 20, 2015, Lava Man's induction into the National Museum of Racing and Hall of Fame was announced. The horse's formal induction took place during ceremonies on August 7, 2015, in Saratoga Springs, New York. "I didn't think he'd get in the Hall of Fame," said Kenly. "He never did much outside of California. What an honor." O'Neill said, "He's family to me and to everyone connected with him. You are lucky if you get a horse like this once in a lifetime."

== Pedigree ==
Pedigree of Lava Man (USA), bay gelding, 2001
Sire Slew City Slew (USA) 1984	Seattle Slew (USA); 1974	Bold Reasoning	Boldnesian
Sire Slew City Slew (USA) 1984	Seattle Slew (USA); 1974	Bold Reasoning	Reason to Earn
Sire Slew City Slew (USA) 1984	Seattle Slew (USA); 1974	My Charmer	Poker
Sire Slew City Slew (USA) 1984	Seattle Slew (USA); 1974	My Charmer	Fair Charmer
Sire Slew City Slew (USA) 1984	Weber City Miss (USA); 1977	Berkley Prince	Rash Prince
Sire Slew City Slew (USA) 1984	Weber City Miss (USA); 1977	Berkley Prince	Betrayed
Sire Slew City Slew (USA) 1984	Weber City Miss (USA); 1977	Esirnus	Sunrise Flight
Sire Slew City Slew (USA) 1984	Weber City Miss (USA); 1977	Esirnus	Water Lady
Dam Lil Miss Leonard (USA) 1992	Nostalgia's Star (USA); 1982	Nostalgia	Silent Screen
Dam Lil Miss Leonard (USA) 1992	Nostalgia's Star (USA); 1982	Nostalgia	The Garden Club
Dam Lil Miss Leonard (USA) 1992	Nostalgia's Star (USA); 1982	Aunt Carol	Big Spruce
Dam Lil Miss Leonard (USA) 1992	Nostalgia's Star (USA); 1982	Aunt Carol	Dinky Pinky
Dam Lil Miss Leonard (USA) 1992	Pink Native (USA); 1982	Be A Native	Exclusive Native
Dam Lil Miss Leonard (USA) 1992	Pink Native (USA); 1982	Be A Native	Poteen
Dam Lil Miss Leonard (USA) 1992	Pink Native (USA); 1982	Pink Khal	Khalex
Dam Lil Miss Leonard (USA) 1992	Pink Native (USA); 1982	Pink Khal	Pinky Jo (Family:8-k)

== See also ==
- Repeat winners of horse races
