= Aaron Gryder =

American jockey

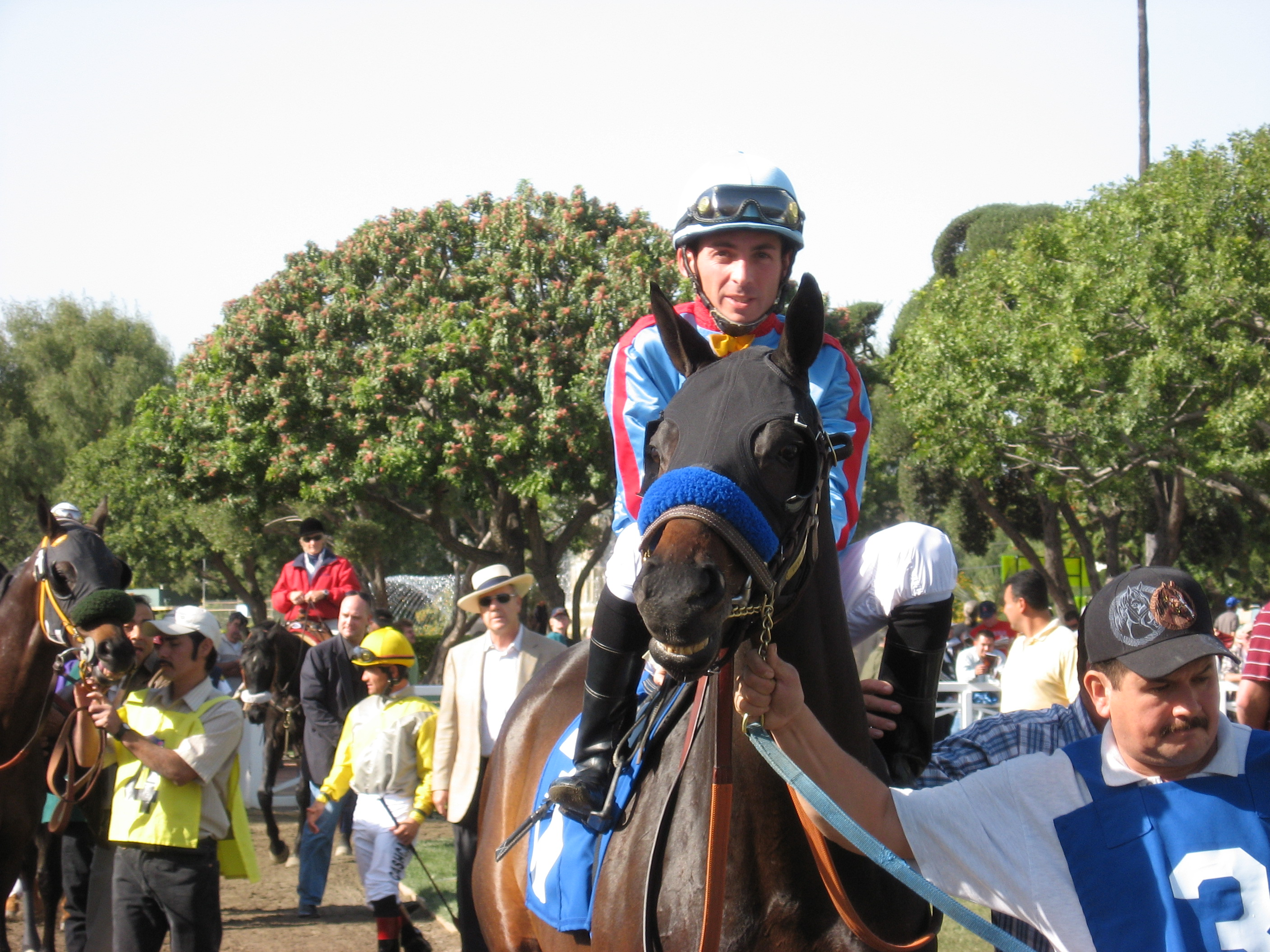
- Aaron Gryder on Devil's Bay in 2007.

Personal information
- Born: June 5, 1970 (age 56) West Covina, California
- Occupation: Jockey

Horse racing career
- Sport: Horse racing
- Career winnings: $100,000,000 (ongoing)
- Career wins: 3,900+ (ongoing)

Major racing wins
- Matriarch Stakes (1987); Stephen Foster Handicap (1990, 1995); Adirondack Stakes (1991); Super Derby (1992); Stymie Handicap (1992); Hopeful Stakes (1992); Hawthorne Gold Cup Handicap (1993); Laurence Armour Handicap (1993); American Derby (1995); Mac Diarmida Handicap (1996); Interborough Handicap (1998); Count Fleet Stakes (1998, 2003); Jimmy Winkfield Stakes (1998); Stuyvesant Handicap (1998); Dearly Precious Stakes (1998, 2000); Busher Stakes (1998, 2004); Damon Runyon Stakes (1998, 2000, 2002, 2015); Ruthless Stakes (1999); Affectionately Handicap (1999); Nashua Stakes (2000); National Museum of Racing Hall of Fame Stakes (2000); Broadway Handicap (2000); Paumonok Handicap (1998, 2001, 2002, 2005); Distaff Handicap (2001); New York Breeders' Futurity (2002); Bed O' Roses Breeders' Cup Handicap (2003); Aqueduct Handicap (2004); The Saratoga Dew (2004); Queens County Handicap (2004); Longfellow Stakes (2005); Potrero Grande Handicap (2007); Bay Meadows Breeders' Cup Sprint (2007); Sunshine Millions Sprint (2007); Icecapade Stakes (2007); Hollywood Breeders' Cup Oaks (2007); San Simeon Handicap (2007); Hawthorne Handicap (2008); San Fernando Stakes (2008); San Antonio Handicap (2008); San Diego Handicap (2008); Goodwood Stakes (2008); Daytona Handicap (2009); Las Flores Handicap (2009) International race wins: Dubai World Cup (2009) American Classics / Breeders' Cup wins: Breeders' Cup Marathon (2012)

Significant horses
- Well Armed, Tough Tiz's Sis, Barbecue Eddie, Say Florida Sandy, Seattle Fitz, Songandaprayer, Dat You Miz Blue, Smokey Stover, Desert Code, Calidoscopio
- Updated on August 3, 2008

Aaron Tod Gryder (born June 5, 1970, in West Covina, California) is an American Thoroughbred horse racing jockey.

== Career ==
At age 16 in 1986, Gryder began his career as a professional jockey in Tijuana, Mexico at Agua Caliente Racetrack. His first winner came in 1987 at Agua Caliente aboard Ragen Henry. Gryder returned to the United States to ride at Santa Anita Park. His first win came on long shot horse with no left eye named One Eyed Romeo. He later rode at Hollywood Park as an apprentice jockey, and became the first and only apprentice jockey to ever win the Leading Rider title in the track's 75-year history. Gryder has also won several Leading Rider titles at Churchill Downs, Arlington Park, Aqueduct Racetrack, and Golden Gate Fields.

In 2009, Gryder rode Well Armed to a win in the world's richest race, the $6,000,000 Dubai World Cup, finishing 14 lengths in front of Gloria De Campeao, the largest margin of victory in the history of the race. Gryder won the 2012 G1 Breeders' Cup Marathon on long shot Calidoscopio. At the time of his retirement, Gryder had more than 4,000 victories internationally,

Beyond racing, Gryder appeared in television's Dellaventura and The Sopranos. He has worked as an On-Air Analyst for ESPN, NBC Sports, Fox Sports, TVG Network, and HRTV. He was one of the six jockeys featured in Animal Planet's 2009 reality documentary, Jockeys. Gryder retired from racing in 2020. He joined Stronach Group in 2021 as Vice President of racing industry relations.

== Year-end charts ==
Chart (2000–present)	Peak position
National Earnings List for Jockeys 2000	12
National Earnings List for Jockeys 2001	21
National Earnings List for Jockeys 2002	43
National Earnings List for Jockeys 2003	61
National Earnings List for Jockeys 2004	39
National Earnings List for Jockeys 2005	43
National Earnings List for Jockeys 2006	43
National Earnings List for Jockeys 2007	40
National Earnings List for Jockeys 2008	47
National Earnings List for Jockeys 2009	37
National Earnings List for Jockeys 2012	90
