= Corey Nakatani =

American jockey (b. 1970)

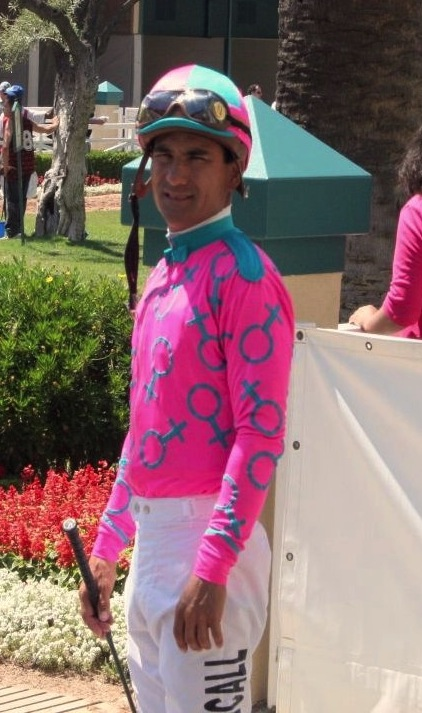

Personal information
- Born: October 21, 1970 (age 55) Covina, California, United States
- Occupation: Jockey

Horse racing career
- Sport: Horse racing
- Career wins: 3,909

Major racing wins
- Hollywood Turf Cup Stakes (1990, 1998, 2010); Hollywood Derby (1990, 1993, 1996); Coaching Club American Oaks (1991); Kentucky Oaks (1991, 1996); Del Mar Futurity (1993); Miesque Stakes (1993, 2001, 2004); Yellow Ribbon Stakes (1993); Lane's End Stakes (1995); Beverly D. Stakes (1995, 2001); John C. Mabee Handicap (1995, 1996, 1998, 2006); Hawthorne Handicap (1996); Kentucky Cup Classic Handicap (1996); San Felipe Stakes (1996, 2006); Flower Bowl Invitational Stakes (1997); Beldame Stakes (1998); Champagne Stakes (1998); Garden City Breeders' Cup Handicap (1998, 2001); Super Derby (1998); Royal Heroine Stakes (1999, 2003); Landaluce Stakes (1997, 2000, 2009); Santa Anita Handicap (2000, 2006, 2007); Sir Beaufort Stakes (2003); Yerba Buena Handicap (2003); Frizette Stakes (2004); Generous Stakes (2004, 2006, 2010); Sunshine Millions Fillies & Mares Sprint (2004); Del Mar Breeders' Cup Mile (2006); Goodwood Breeders' Cup Handicap (2006); Hollywood Gold Cup (2006, 2007); Sunshine Millions Classic (2006); Fair Grounds Oaks (2007); First Lady Stakes (2007); San Rafael Stakes (2007); Sunshine Millions Turf (2007); Commonwealth Breeders' Cup Stakes (2007); Suwannee River Handicap (2007); Santa Anita Derby (2008); Princess Rooney Handicap (2008); Gallant Bloom Handicap (2008); Eddie Read Handicap (1994, 1996, 2002, 2006, 2009); Shoemaker Mile Stakes (2010); Regret Stakes (2010); Oak Tree Derby (2010); CashCall Futurity (2010); Chicago Handicap (2011); West Virginia Governor's Stakes (2012) International race wins: Molson Export Million (1994); Dubai Golden Shaheen (2001); Canadian International Stakes (2005) Breeders' Cup wins: Breeders' Cup Distaff (1996); Breeders' Cup Sprint (1996, 1997, 1998, 2006); Breeders' Cup Mile (1999); Breeders' Cup Juvenile Fillies (2004, 2011); Breeders' Cup Turf Sprint (2011); Breeders' Cup Dirt Mile (2012)

Racing awards
- Riding Titles; Del Mar: 1994, 1998, 2004; Oak Tree: 1994, 1995, 2004, 2006; Hollywood Park: 1995; Santa Anita: 1996, 2000

Honors
- National Museum of Racing and Hall of Fame (2023)

Significant horses
- Jackson Bend, Nehro, Colonel John, Lava Man, Thor's Echo, Aragorn, Indian Blessing, Lit de Justice, Lite Light, Relaxed Gesture, Sandpit, Serena's Song, Silic, Bolt d'Oro
- Updated on 25 April 2023

Corey S. Nakatani (born October 21, 1970) is a retired American Hall of Fame Thoroughbred horse racing jockey. He has won 3,909 races in his career including the Kentucky Oaks twice and the Strub Stakes four times. He has won ten races in the Breeders' Cup, including three consecutive victories in the Breeders' Cup Sprint between 1996 and 1998. A fixture on the southern California racing circuit, Nakatani won a total of ten riding titles between Santa Anita Park, Del Mar and the now-closed Hollywood Park.

== Background ==
Nakatani is married to his second wife, Lisa, and has two daughters, Lilah and Brittany, and two sons, Matthew, a sports agent who specialises in horse racing and previous Louisville Cardinals football placekicker, and Austin. Brittany, Matthew, and Austin are from a previous marriage to Michele Dollase, daughter of trainer Wallace Dollase. His late father Roy Nakatani, a Japanese American, was born in a World War II internment camp and spent time at Santa Anita Park when it was a relocation camp. Corey's mother is Marie Nakatani and he is one of ten children.

== Racing career ==
Corey was a champion high school wrestler who became intrigued by racing after visiting Santa Anita with his father after a wrestling tournament at the age of sixteen. Nakatani eventually approached horse trainer Roger Stein for work. After three days of mucking out stalls and walking horses, he decided he wanted to ride even though he had never been on a horse before. Stein then suggested that he get some experience on a working farm, so he learned the ropes on the Thoroughbred farm of Tony Matos. He then went on and broke and galloped horses for Johnny Longden and Longden's son, Eric Longden before starting his career as a jockey. He graduated from jockey school in Castaic, California, and won his first race, a dead heat, in Caliente, Mexico in 1988 aboard Blue King. He moved to Southern California in April 1989, and became the leading apprentice jockey that same year. His current residence is Southern California.

Nakatani won his 3,500th race at Aqueduct Racetrack on November 17, 2011, aboard Grand Strategy in the eighth race of the day.

Nakatani has ridden a number of notable horses including Jackson Bend, Nehro, Colonel John, Lava Man, Thor's Echo, Aragorn, Rock Hard Ten, Sarafan, Indian Blessing, Lite Light, Relaxed Gesture, Sandpit, Serena's Song, Bolt d'Oro, Silic, and Lit de Justice.

In the 2015 Kentucky Derby, won by American Pharoah, Nakatani was the jockey of Frammento, which placed 15th. Weeks earlier, the jockey had broken his collarbone in a March 17 spill at Santa Anita. In the 2014 Kentucky Derby, he finished sixth on Dance With Fate.

Nakatani was badly injured in a spill at Del Mar in August 2018, suffering multiple compression fractures and herniated discs. Nakatani never returned to the saddle and formally announced his retirement as a jockey on November 23, 2019, in a statement through his son and jockey agent Matt.

In 2023 Nakatani will be inducted into the National Museum of Racing and Hall of Fame.

Chart (2000–present)	Rank by earnings
National Earnings List for Jockeys 2000	9
National Earnings List for Jockeys 2001	16
National Earnings List for Jockeys 2002	35
National Earnings List for Jockeys 2003	17
National Earnings List for Jockeys 2004	7
National Earnings List for Jockeys 2005	12
National Earnings List for Jockeys 2006	6
National Earnings List for Jockeys 2007	21
National Earnings List for Jockeys 2008	71
National Earnings List for Jockeys 2009	116
National Earnings List for Jockeys 2010	48
National Earnings List for Jockeys 2011	16
National Earnings List for Jockeys 2012	18
National Earnings List for Jockeys 2013	35
National Earnings List for Jockeys 2014	22
National Earnings List for Jockeys 2015	106
National Earnings List for Jockeys 2016	192
National Earnings List for Jockeys 2017	46
