= Joel Rosario =

Dominican Republic jockey

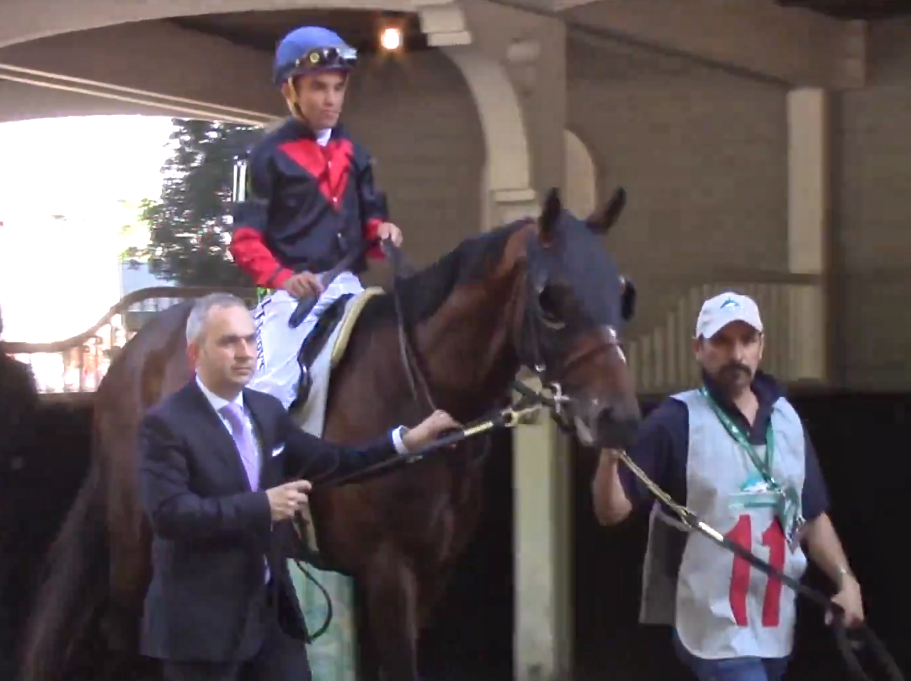
- Joel Rosario on Tonalist at the 2014 Belmont Stakes

Personal information
- Born: January 14, 1985 (age 41) Santo Domingo, Dominican Republic
- Occupation: Jockey
- Height: 5’0”

Horse racing career
- Sport: Horse racing
- Career wins: 3,678

Major racing wins
- Ogden Phipps Stakes (2014, 2022, 2023, 2024); Pan American Stakes (2014, 2022, 2024); Pennine Ridge Stakes (2020, 2021, 2024); Winning Colors Stakes (2020, 2021, 2024); Gotham Stakes (2013, 2024); San Marcos Stakes (2021, 2024); New Orleans Classic Stakes (2018, 2024); Lecomte Stakes (2024); Beaugay Stakes (2024); Matriarch Stakes (2010, 2014, 2017, 2020, 2023); Franklin-Simpson Stakes (2010, 2023); Kingston Stakes (2016, 2023); Alabama Stakes (2023); Oaklawn Handicap (2023); Muniz Memorial Classic Stakes (2023); Mother Goose Stakes (2013, 2017, 2021, 2022); Shuvee Stakes (2020, 2021, 2022); Louisiana Derby (2021, 2022); Test Stakes (2019, 2022); Wood Memorial Stakes (2015, 2022); Travers Stakes (2022); Churchill Downs Stakes (2022); La Troienne Stakes (2022); Santa Anita Handicap (2019, 2020, 2021); Whitney Stakes (2016, 2021); Pegasus World Cup (2021); Ruffian Stakes (2021); Vosburgh Stakes (2021); Jaipur Stakes(2020); Shoemaker Mile Stakes(2020); Man o' War Stakes (2014, 2019); San Antonio Handicap (2009, 2018, 2019); First Lady Stakes (2019); Spinaway Stakes (2018); Personal Ensign Stakes (2014, 2017); Pegasus World Cup Turf Invitational (2017); Metropolitan Handicap (2013, 2016); New York Stakes (2014); Edgewood Stakes (2013); Pacific Classic Stakes (2012); Santa Maria Handicap (2010, 2011); Las Virgenes Stakes (2011); Strub Stakes (2011); Del Mar Derby (2009, 2010); La Jolla Handicap (2008, 2010); San Simeon Handicap (2009, 2010); La Brea Stakes (2009, 2010); Queen Elizabeth II Challenge Cup Stakes (2010); Malibu Stakes (2010); Santa Ysabel Stakes (2010); Del Mar Mile Handicap (2009); Honeymoon Handicap (2008, 2009); Miesque Stakes (2009); Santa Ana Handicap (2009); Sunshine Millions Oaks (2009); A Gleam Handicap (2009); Cinema Handicap (2009); Ack Ack Handicap (2009); Clasico del Caribe (2008); California Cup Matron (2008); Yerba Buena Stakes (2007) International Wins; Norfolk Stakes (2013, 2018); Dubai World Cup (2013) U.S. Triple Crown wins: Kentucky Derby (2013); Belmont Stakes (2014, 2019) Breeders' Cup wins: Breeders' Cup Sprint (2009); Breeders' Cup Filly & Mare Sprint (2015, 2019); Breeders' Cup Mile (2016, 2019); Breeders' Cup Turf Sprint (2017); Breeders' Cup Juvenile (2018); Breeders' Cup Juvenile Fillies (2018, 2020, 2021); Breeders Cup Classic (2018, 2021); Breeders' Cup Dirt Mile (2020)

Racing awards
- Eclipse Award for Outstanding Jockey (2021)

Honours
- National Museum of Racing and Hall of Fame (2024)

Significant horses
- Accelerate, Animal Kingdom, Blind Luck, Sicotico, Bobby's Kitten, Close Hatches, Dancing in Silks, Game Winner, Jackie's Warrior, Jaywalk, Knicks Go, Orb, Frosted, Tonalist
- Updated on 12 February 2022

Joel Rosario (born January 14, 1985) is a Dominican jockey who mainly competes in American thoroughbred horse racing, originally from the Dominican Republic. In the space of five weeks in 2013 he rode the winners of the Dubai World Cup and the Kentucky Derby. In 2021 he rode Knicks Go to wins in the Pegasus World Cup, Whitney Stakes, and Breeders' Cup Classic.

A winner of 15 Breeders' Cup races and nine riding titles in Southern California, Rosario was elected to the National Museum of Racing and Hall of Fame in 2024 in his first year of eligibility.

== Career ==
On December 11, 2009, Rosario equaled a Hollywood Park Racetrack record when he won six races on a single race card. Previously, the feat had been achieved by Hall of Fame jockeys Bill Shoemaker (1953, 1970), Laffit Pincay, Jr. (1968), and Kent Desormeaux (1992).

On March 30, 2013, Rosario won what was then the world's richest horse race, the US$10 million Dubai World Cup at Meydan Racecourse in Dubai, aboard the US-based stallion Animal Kingdom. The same year, on May 4, 2013, he won the Kentucky Derby aboard the colt Orb. On June 20, 2013, Rosario won the Norfolk Stakes aboard No Nay Never at Royal Ascot, and broke the 5 furlong track record for two-year-olds. In 2014, he won the Belmont Stakes on Tonalist. In April 2015, he surpassed 2,000 career wins.

On November 13, 2020, Rosario won his 3,000th career race aboard Hit the Woah at Aqueduct Racetrack.

=== Year-end charts ===
Chart (2005–present)	Rank by earnings
National Earnings List for Jockeys 2005	1361
National Earnings List for Jockeys 2006	578
National Earnings List for Jockeys 2007	80
National Earnings List for Jockeys 2008	20
National Earnings List for Jockeys 2009	5
National Earnings List for Jockeys 2010	3
National Earnings List for Jockeys 2011	4
National Earnings List for Jockeys 2012	5
National Earnings List for Jockeys 2013	2
National Earnings List for Jockeys 2014	2
National Earnings List for Jockeys 2015	5
National Earnings List for Jockeys 2016	6
National Earnings List for Jockeys 2017	6
National Earnings List for Jockeys 2018	4
National Earnings List for Jockeys 2019	4
National Earnings List for Jockeys 2020	2
National Earnings List for Jockeys 2021	1
