= David R. Flores =

Mexican jockey

David Flores
Personal information
- Born: February 5, 1968 (age 58) Tijuana, Mexico
- Occupation: Jockey

Horse racing career
- Sport: Horse racing
- Career wins: 3,000+ (ongoing) kids = John Flores, Jordyn Flores, Cynthia Flores, Natalia Flores, Taylor Flores, Priscilla Flores

Major racing wins
- Hollywood Gold Cup (1991, 1996, 2010); Miesque Stakes (1991, 2002); Eddie Read Handicap (1992, 1998, 2003); Del Mar Futurity (1996, 1999, 2002); Cornhusker Handicap (1997); Santa Anita Handicap (1997); San Felipe Stakes (1997, 1999); Texas Mile Stakes (1997, 2001, 2008); Kentucky Oaks (1998); Moccasin Stakes (1998); Speakeasy Stakes (1998); Pacific Classic Stakes (1999); Godolphin Mile (2001); UAE Derby (2001); Yellow Ribbon Stakes (2001); Yerba Buena Handicap (2001); American Oaks (2003); Arlington Million (2003); Sunshine Millions Oaks (2003, 2004, 2007); Turf Paradise Derby (2003, 2009); Daytona Handicap (2004); Sunshine Millions Fillies & Mares Sprint (2006); Sunshine Millions Filly & Mare Turf (2006); Gamely Stakes (2007); Malibu Stakes (2007, 2008); CashCall Mile Invitational Stakes (2008); Los Angeles Handicap (2008); Sunshine Millions Dash (2008); Triple Bend Invitational Handicap (2008); Senorita Stakes (2009); Illinois Derby (2010) Breeders' Cup wins: Breeders' Cup Juvenile Fillies (2001); Breeders' Cup Juvenile (2003); Breeders' Cup Mile (2004)

Significant horses
- Tempera, Silver Charm, Siphon, Sulamani, Marquetry, Bob Black Jack, Zenyatta, Majestic City, Sarah's Secret (horse)
- Updated on January 28, 2007

David Romero Flores (born February 5, 1968) is a Mexican jockey in American Thoroughbred horse racing.

Flores was born in Tijuana, Mexico. His father was a jockey and an exercise rider in Southern California.

David Flores rode his first winner at Agua Caliente Racetrack in his native Mexico in 1984. He went on to win riding titles at Santa Anita Park, Del Mar Racetrack, Oak Tree Racing Association and Fairplex. His big break came in 1996 and 1997 when he rode Siphon to victories in big races. Among his notable victories were three Breeders' Cup wins aboard Tempera, Action This Day, and Singletary. Riding for Godolphin Stables, he won the UAE Derby in 2001 aboard Express Tour.

In May 2007, Flores earned his 3,000th career victory by winning the Lazaro Barrera Memorial Stakes at Hollywood Park Racetrack.

In December 2013, Flores moved his tack to Singapore. On March 25, 2015, Singapore racing authorities suspended Flores for one year for "failing to take all reasonable and permissible measures to obtain the best possible placing" in a race run the previous month. This was effectively reversed by stewards in California on May 7, who ruled following a formal fitness hearing that Flores was permitted to hold a jockey license.

== Year-end charts ==
Chart (2000–present)	Peak position
National Earnings List for Jockeys 2000	16
National Earnings List for Jockeys 2001	15
National Earnings List for Jockeys 2002	23
National Earnings List for Jockeys 2003	11
National Earnings List for Jockeys 2004	18
National Earnings List for Jockeys 2005	46
National Earnings List for Jockeys 2006	27
National Earnings List for Jockeys 2007	15
National Earnings List for Jockeys 2008	22
National Earnings List for Jockeys 2009	84
National Earnings List for Jockeys 2010	47
National Earnings List for Jockeys 2011	47
National Earnings List for Jockeys 2012	60
National Earnings List for Jockeys 2013	95
