= California Thoroughbred Breeders Association =

US non-profit organization

The California Thoroughbred Breeders Association (CTBA), founded in 1937, is a non-profit organization committed to the advancement of thoroughbred breeding and racing in California. It is governed by a board of 16 directors elected by the association's general membership. The current president of the CTBA is Doug Burge.

The CTBA is among the largest organizations of its kind in the nation.

== See also ==
- California Horse of the Year
