= Precisionist Stakes top three finishers and starters =

This is a listing of the horses that finished in either first, second, or third place and the number of starters in the Precisionist Stakes, an American Thoroughbred horse race run at Santa Anita Park in Arcadia, California. The race is a Grade 3 event for horses three years-old and older and run at 1-1/16 miles in dirt.

From inception through 2013 the race was known as the Mervyn Leroy Handicap when it was hosted by Hollywood Park Racetrack in Inglewood, California. (List 1980–present)

Year	Winner	Second	Third	Starters
2013	Liaison	Kettle Corn	Guilt Trip	6
2012	Morning Line	Prayer for Relief	Kettle Corn	
2011	Crown of Thorns	Sidneys Candy	Spurrier	
2010	Rail Trip	Sangaree	Cigar Man	
2009	Ball Four	Rail Trip	Dakota Phone	6
2008	Surf Cat	Desert code	Global Hunter	8
2007	Molengao	Porto Santo	Buzzards Bay	8
2006	Surf Cat	Spellbinder	Dixie Meister	5
2005	Ace Blue	Ender's Shadow	Borrego	7
2004	Even The Score	Ender's Shadow	Total Impact	8
2003	Total Impact	Fleetstreet Dancer	Piensa Sonando	8
2002	Sky Jack	Bosque Redondo	Devine Wind	6
2001	Futural	Skimming	Moonlight Charger	5
2000	Out Of Mind	Early Pioneer	Skimming	7
1999	Budroyale	Moore's Flat	Wild Wonder	6
1998	Wild Wonder	Budroyale	Flick	7
1997	Hesabull	Region	Kingdom Found	5
1996	Siphon	Del Mar Dennis	Dramatic Gold	4
1995	Tossofthecoin	Ferrara	Polar Route	8
1994	Del Mar Dennis	Tinner's Way	Hill Pass	6
1993	Marquetry	Potrillion	Lottery Winner	6
1992	Another Review	Sir Beaufort	Marquetry	5
1991	Louis Cyphre	Warcraft	Anshan	6
1990	Super May	Charlatan	Lively One	12
1989	Ruhlmann	Sabona	Perfec Travel	5
1988	Judge Angelucci	Simply Majestic	Mark Chip	8
1987	Zabaleta	Nostalgia's Star	Sabona	7
1986	Skywalker	Sabona	Al Mamoon	8
1985	Precisionist	Greinton	My Habitony	5
1984	Sari's Dreamer	Fighting Fit	Ancestral	7
1983	Fighting Fit	Island Whirl	Kangroo Court	7
1982	Mehmet	A Run	Major Sport	6
1981	Eleven Stitches	Glorious Song	Summer Time Guy	8
1980	Spectacular Bid	Peregrinator	Beau's Eagle	6
