= Autumn Miss Stakes =

- Class: Grade III
- Location: Santa Anita Park; Arcadia, California, USA
- Inaugurated: 1981 (as Yankee Valor Handicap)
- Race type: Thoroughbred - Flat racing
- Website: Santa Anita

Race information
- Distance: 1 mile (8 furlongs)
- Surface: Turf
- Track: Left-handed
- Qualification: Three-year-old fillies
- Weight: 124 lbs. with allowances
- Purse: $100,000 (since 2003)

The Autumn Miss Stakes is a Grade III American Thoroughbred horse race for fillies that are three years old, over a distance of one mile on the turf track held annually in October at Santa Anita Park, Arcadia, California. The event currently carries a purse of $100,000.

== History ==
The inaugural running of the event as part of the Oak Tree Racing Association fall meeting at Santa Anita Park was on 10 October 1981 as the Yankee Valor Handicap for three-year-olds and older over a distance of 1 1/16 miles on the dirt and was won by Rogers Red Top Farm's Shamgo who ridden by US Hall of Fame jockey Laffit Pincay Jr. finishing fast to win by a neck over Major Sport in a time of 1:42.80. The event was not held the following year.

In 1985 the three-year-old filly Fran's Valentine, winner of the Kentucky Oaks that year won the event defeating her male counterparts in her preparation for the Breeders' Cup. In 1986 the distance of the event was increased to 1 1/8 miles and attracted several horses who were aiming for the Breeders' Cup which was held at Santa Anita Park. This included 1985 Breeders' Cup Sprint winner Precisionist who won the race by an emphatic 4 1/2 lengths over Garthorn and 1985 Breeders' Cup Juvenile winner Tasso. Precisionist finished third in the Breeders' Cup Classic to Skywalker.

In 1987 the distance was reverted to 1 1/16 miles.

In 1989 the event was renamed the Harold C. Ramser Sr. Handicap after Harold C. Ramser (3 February 1908 – 15 May 1989) who was a prominent businessman involved in Republican politics in California and horse racing aficionado. The same year the American Graded Stakes Committee upgraded the event to Grade III classification.

After not being held in 1990 the Oak Tree Racing Association changed the conditions of the event to a turf race for three-year-old fillies over a distance of a mile. The event was not stable by not being held continuously every season and lost its graded status in 1993.

In 2002, the race was run in two divisions.

In 2008 the event regained its Grade III status. In 2010 the event was held at Hollywood Park when the Oak Tree Racing Association held their meeting that year.

After the Oak Tree Racing Association ceased holding their meeting at Santa Anita the event was renamed to its present title Autumn Miss Stakes.

== Records ==
Speed record:

- 1 mile (turf): 1:32.66 Lull (2017)
- 1 1/16 miles (dirt): 1:40.60 Present Value (1989)

Margins

- 4 1/2 lengths: Precisionist (1986)

Most wins by a jockey:

- 3 - Pat Valenzuela (1985, 2002, 2003)
- 3 - Gary Stevens (1986, 1998, 2004)
- 3 - Kent J. Desormeaux (1995, 2000, 2015)
- 3 - Flavien Prat (2017, 2018, 2020)

Most wins by a trainer:

- 2 - Wayne Charlton (1983, 1984)
- 2 - Ron McAnally (1999, 2004)
- 2 - Robert Frankel (2002, 2005)
- 2 - Neil D. Drysdale (2006, 2018)
- 2 - Craig A. Lewis (2003, 2020)
- 2 - Philip D'Amato (2021, 2022)

Most wins by an owner:

- 2 - Brent W. Charlton (1983, 1984)
- 2 - The Thoroughbred Corporation (1998, 2002)

== Winners ==
Year	Winner	Age	Jockey	Trainer	Owner	Distance	Time	Purse	Grade	Ref
At Santa Anita Park – Autumn Miss Stakes
2026	People Watching	3	Katie Davis	Thomas F. Proctor	Glen Hill Farm	1 mile	1:34.10	$102,000	III	
2025	Warming	3	Juan J. Hernandez	H. Graham Motion	Eclipse Thoroughbred Partners	1 mile	1:34.44	$102,000	III	
2024	Watchtower	3	Diego Herrera	Richard Baltas	Abbondanza Racing, Omar Aldabbagh & Michael Iavarone	1 mile	1:34.35	$102,500	III	
2023	Ruby Nell	3	Edwin Maldonado	Richard E. Mandella	Spendthrift Farm	1 mile	1:32.67	$101,000	III	
2022	Rhea Moon (IRE)	3	Juan Hernandez	Philip D'Amato	Rockingham Ranch & Talla Racing	1 mile	1:34.44	$103,000	III	
2021	Burgoo Alley (IRE)	3	Umberto Rispoli	Philip D'Amato	CYBT, Michael Nentwig & Ray Pagano	1 mile	1:34.37	$101,500	III	
2020	Warren's Showtime	3	Flavien Prat	Craig A. Lewis	Benjamin C. & Sally Warren	1 mile	1:33.77	$101,000	III	
2019	Keeper Ofthe Stars	3	Abel Cedillo	Jonathan Wong	Tommy Town Thoroughbreds	1 mile	1:32.70	$102,457	III	
2018	Toinette	3	Flavien Prat	Neil D. Drysdale	Lisa & Nicholas Hawkins, Joseph & Lynne Hudson & Ken Baca	1 mile	1:33.11	$103,105	III	
2017	Lull	3	Flavien Prat	Christophe Clement	Claiborne Farm & Adele B. Dilschneider	1 mile	1:32.66	$102,760	III	
2016	Cover Song	3	Kent J. Desormeaux	Carla Gaines	Spendthrift Farm	1 mile	1:33.73	$101,725	III	
2015	Belle Hill	3	Leslie Mawing	Larry D. Ross	Aithon Stable	1 mile	1:35.10	$101,250	III	
2014	Lexie Lou	3	Corey Nakatani	Mark E. Casse	Gary Barber	1 mile	1:33.70	$101,250	III	
2013	Wishing Gate	3	Gary L. Stevens	Thomas F. Proctor	Glen Hill Farm	1 mile	1:34.67	$101,500	III	
2012	Lady Ten	3	Rafael Bejarano	Bob Baffert	Mercedes Stables	1 mile	1:34.95	$100,000	III	
At Santa Anita Park – Harold C. Ramser Sr. Stakes
2011	Up In Time (GB)	3	Martin Garcia	Simon Callaghan	Anthony Ramsden & Three Chimneys Farms	1 mile	1:34.25	$100,000	III	
At Hollywood Park – Harold C. Ramser Sr. Handicap
2010	Go Forth North	3	David R. Flores	A. C. Avila	L-Bo Racing, Monte Pyle & Summer of Fun Racing	1 mile	1:34.48	$100,000	III	
At Santa Anita Park
2009	April Pride (GB)	3	Garrett K. Gomez	James M. Cassidy	Forging Oaks Farm	1 mile	1:34.02	$100,000	III	
2008	Tasha's Miracle	3	Mike E. Smith	John W. Sadler	Budget Stable & Team Valor	1 mile	1:34.83	$106,100	III	
2007	Gotta Have Her	3	Richard Migliore	Jenine Sahadi	Green Lantern Stables	1 mile	1:34.16	$110,600	Listed	
2006	Illuminise (IRE)	3	Corey Nakatani	Neil D. Drysdale	Ballygallon Stud	1 mile	1:34.62	$100,000	Listed	
2005	Louvain (IRE)	3	Tyler Baze	Robert J. Frankel	Edmund A. Gann	1 mile	1:35.14	$100,000	Listed	
2004	Mea Domina	3	Gary L. Stevens	Ron McAnally	Janis R. Whitham	1 mile	1:33.90	$100,000	Listed	
2003	§Valentine Dancer	3	Pat Valenzuela	Craig A. Lewis	Al & Saundra Kirkwood	1 mile	1:32.87	$113,900	Listed	
2002	Kithira (GB)	3	Pat Valenzuela	Robert J. Frankel	Juddmonte Farms	1 mile	1:33.73	$83,300	Listed	Division 1
2002	Sentimental Value	3	Victor Espinoza	Kristin Mulhall	The Thoroughbred Corporation	1 mile	1:33.98	$84,300	Listed	Division 2
2001	Cindy's Hero	3	Garrett K. Gomez	David E. Hofmans	Tom & Elizabeth Baxter	1 mile	1:33.70	$110,500	Listed	
2000	High Margin	3	Kent J. Desormeaux	Craig Dollase	Bruce K. & Joanne H. Thayre	1 mile	1:35.19	$108,000	Listed	
1999	Olympic Charmer	3	Chris McCarron	Ron McAnally	Deborah McAnally	1 mile	1:34.30	$111,800	Listed	
1998	Sapphire Ring (GB)	3	Gary L. Stevens	Wallace Dollase	The Thoroughbred Corporation	1 mile	1:38.32	$100,000	Listed	
1996–1997		Race not held								
1995	Ski Dancer	3	Kent J. Desormeaux	Gary F. Jones	Kallenberg Thoroughbred	1 mile	1:36.78	$107,200	Listed	
1994	Race not held									
1993	Zoonaqua	3	Alex O. Solis	Brian A. Mayberry	Jerry & Ann Moss	1 mile	1:34.42	$85,300	Listed	
1992	Race not held									
1991	Flawlessly	3	Chris McCarron	Charles E. Whittingham	Harbor View Farm	1 mile	1:33.42	$112,500	III	
1990	Race not held									
Conditions 1981–1989: For three-year-olds and older
1989	Present Value	5	Bill Shoemaker	Jerry M. Fanning	Jay Bligh, Richard Fontana & Gary Potter	1 1/16 miles	1:40.60	$106,600	III	
Yankee Valor Handicap
1988	Mi Preferido	3	Eddie Delahoussaye	Laz Barrera	Amin Saiden & Laz Barrera	1 1/16 miles	1:41.80	$106,000		
1987	Super Diamond	7	Laffit Pincay Jr.	Edwin J. Gregson	Roland & Ramona Sahm	1 1/16 miles	1:40.80	$115,500		
1986	Precisionist	5	Gary L. Stevens	Leland R. Fenstermaker	Fred W. Hooper	1 1/8 miles	1:48.40	$94,250		
1985	ƒFran's Valentine	3	Pat Valenzuela	Joseph Manzi	Green Thumb Farm Stable	1 1/16 miles	1:41.80	$106,000		
1984	Pettrax	6	Kenneth D. Black	Wayne Charlton	Brent W. Charlton	1 1/16 miles	1:42.40	$65,500		
1983	†Pettrax	5	Kenneth D. Black	Wayne Charlton	Brent W. Charlton	1 1/16 miles	1:41.80	$65,100		
1982	Race not held									
1981	Shamgo	3	Laffit Pincay Jr.	John Sullivan	Rogers Red Top Farm	1 1/16 miles	1:42.80	$54,350		

Legend:
Dirt Turf
Notes:
§ Ran as an entry
ƒ Filly or Mare
† In the 1983 running of the event Water Bank finished first but was disqualified for brushing Pettrax in the stretch run and set back to second.

== See also ==
List of American and Canadian Graded races
