= Precisionist Stakes =

- Class: Grade III
- Location: Santa Anita Park; Arcadia, California, United States
- Inaugurated: 1980
- Race type: Thoroughbred - Flat racing
- Website: www.hollywoodpark.com

Race information
- Distance: 1 1/16 miles (8.5 furlongs)
- Surface: Dirt
- Track: left-handed
- Qualification: Three-years-old & up
- Weight: Assigned
- Purse: $100,000

The Precisionist Stakes was an American Thoroughbred horse race run annually at Santa Anita Park in Arcadia, California. A Grade III event open to horses, age three and up, it was contested over a distance of one and one-sixteenth miles on Cushion Track synthetic dirt. The race was named for the U.S. Racing Hall of Fame horse, Precisionist who won this race in 1985 in which he set a Hollywood Park track record for the then one mile distance.

The race was run as the Mervyn Leroy Handicap at Hollywood Park Racetrack from inception in 1980 through 2013 when that racetrack closed. The original race was named for the American film director, Mervyn LeRoy who was a racing enthusiast and one of the track's founders. The Mervyn LeRoy Handicap carried a purse of $150,000 and was a prep to the Hollywood Gold Cup.

Elevated to a Grade I event in 1988, it was downgraded to Grade II status in 1991 then to Grade III in 2014.

== Records ==
Speed record:

- 1 1/16 mile - 1:40.20 - Ruhlmann (1989)
- 1 mile - 1:32.80 - Precisionist (1985)

Most wins:

- 2 - Surf Cat (2006, 2008)

Most wins by a jockey:

- 4 - Laffit Pincay, Jr. (1986, 1987, 1989, 2002)

Most wins by a trainer:

- 4 - Robert J. Frankel (1982, 1983, 1991, 1993)

Most wins by an owner:

- 2 - Jerry Moss (1983, 1989)
- 2 - Rosendo G. Parra (2003, 2004)
- 2 - Aase Headley & Marsha Naify (2006, 2008)

== Winners ==
Year	Winner	Age	Jockey	Trainer	Owner	Dist. (Miles)	Time	Grade	Win $
2017	Collected	4	Martin Garcia	Bob Baffert	Speedway Stables	1-1/16	1:41.52	III	$100,000
2016	Race not held								
2015	Catch a Flight	5	Flavien Prat	Richard E. Mandella	Haras Santa Maria de Araras	1-1/16	1:42.22	III	$100,000
2014	Fury Kapcori	4	Rafael Bejarano	Jerry Hollendorfer	Awtrey, Hollendorfer & Todaro	1-1/16	1:42.11	III	$100,000
Mervyn LeRoy Handicap
2013	Liaison	6	Victor Espinoza	John W. Sadler	C R K Stable	1-1/16	1:42.79	II	$150,000
2012	Morning Line	5	Joseph Talamo	John Shirreffs	Farish/Dixiana/Thoroughbred Legends Racing Stable	1-1/16	1:42.42	II	$150,000
2011	Crown of Thorns	6	Tyler Baze	Richard Mandella	Spendthrift Farm	1-1/16	1:42.73	II	$150,000
2010	Rail Trip	5	Rafael Bejarano	Ron Ellis	Jay Em Ess Stable (Siegel family)	1-1/16	1:42.37	II	$150,000
2009	Ball Four	8	Joe Talamo	Patrick Biancone	Flying Zee Stable (Carl Lizza)	1-1/16	1:41.58	II	$150,000
2008	Surf Cat	6	Alex Solis	Bruce Headley	Aase Headley & Marsha Naify	1-1/16	1:41.13	II	$150,000
2007	Molengao	6	Victor Espinoza	Paulo Lobo	Stud TNT	1-1/16	1:42.86	II	$150,000
2006	Surf Cat	4	Alex Solis	Bruce Headley	Aase Headley & Marsha Naify	1-1/16	1:40.65	II	$150,000
2005	Ace Blue	5	David Flores	Paulo Lobo	Eternamente Rio Stud	1-1/16	1:41.45	II	$150,000
2004	Even The Score	6	David Flores	Vladimir Cerin	Rosendo G. Parra	1-1/16	1:40.81	II	$150,000
2003	Total Impact	5	Mike E. Smith	Laura de Seroux	Rosendo G. Parra	1-1/16	1:40.88	II	$150,000
2002	Sky Jack	6	Laffit Pincay, Jr.	Douglas F. O'Neill	Rene & Margie Lambert	1-1/16	1:41.36	II	$150,000
2001	Futural	5	Chris McCarron	Craig Dollase	Jess Miller & Jack Weitz	1-1/16	1:42.02	II	$150,000
2000	Out Of Mind	5	Eddie Delahoussaye	Richard E. Mandella	Sierra Thoroughbreds	1-1/16	1:41.82	II	$150,000
1999	Budroyale	6	Garrett Gomez	Ted H. West	Jeffrey Sengara	1-1/16	1:42.12	II	$150,000
1998	Wild Wonder	4	Eddie Delahoussaye	Greg Gilchrist	VHW Stables	1-1/16	1:40.92	II	$100,000
1997	Hesabull	4	Goncalino Almeida	Mike Chambers	Ron Judy	1-1/16	1:41.30	II	$100,000
1996	Siphon	5	David Flores	Richard E. Mandella	Linneo Eduardo de Paula Machado	1-1/16	1:40.44	II	$100,000
1995	Tossofthecoin	5	Corey Nakatani	Ron McAnally	Sidney Craig	1-1/16	1:40.70	II	$100,000
1994	Del Mar Dennis	4	Sal Gonzalez, Jr.	J. Paco Gonzalez	Trudy McCaffery & John Toffan	1-1/16	1:40.48	II	$155,000
1993	Marquetry	6	Kent Desormeaux	Robert J. Frankel	Morley Engelson & R. J. Frankel	1-1/8	1:49.10	II	$155,000
1992	Another Review	4	Kent Desormeaux	Chris Speckert	Thomas Mellon Evans	1-1/16	1:41.38	II	$150,000
1991	Louis Cyphre	5	José A. Santos	Robert J. Frankel	Edmund A. Gann	1-1/16	1:40.80	I	$185,000
1990	Super May	4	Robbie Davis	Richard E. Mandella	Jack Kent Cooke	1-1/16	1:40.80	I	$200,000
1989	Ruhlmann	4	Laffit Pincay, Jr.	Charles E. Whittingham	Jerry Moss	1-1/16	1:40.20	I	$200,000
1988	Judge Angelucci	5	Eddie Delahoussaye	Charles E. Whittingham	Olin B. Gentry	1-1/16	1:40.80	I	$200,000
1987	Zabaleta	4	Laffit Pincay, Jr.	John Gosden	Michael Riordan	1 mile	1:34.80	II	$200,000
1986	Skywalker	4	Laffit Pincay, Jr.	Michael C. Whittingham	Oak Cliff Stable (Thomas P. Tatham & partners)	1 mile	1:34.80	II	$200,000
1985	Precisionist	4	Chris McCarron	L. Ross Fenstermaker	Fred W. Hooper	1 mile	1:32.80	II	$200,000
1984	Sari's Dreamer	5	Rafael Meza	Melvin F. Stute	Carl Grinstead & Ben Rochelle	1 mile	1:34.20	II	$160,000
1983	Fighting Fit	4	Bill Shoemaker	Robert J. Frankel	Jerry Moss	1 mile	1:35.80	II	$100,000
1982	Mehmet	4	Sandy Hawley	Robert J. Frankel	A. J. Chlad et al.	1 mile	1:34.60	II	$100,000
1981	Eleven Stitches	4	Sandy Hawley	Donn Luby	Morey & Claudia Mirkin	1 mile	1:36.40		$160,000
1980	Spectacular Bid	4	Bill Shoemaker	Bud Delp	Hawksworth Farm (Harry & Teresa Meyerhoff)	1 mile	1:40.40		$200,000

== See also ==
- Precisionist Stakes / Mervyn Leroy Handicap top three finishers and starters
