= Tokyo City Cup Stakes =

- Class: Non-Listed Black Type
- Location: Santa Anita Park; Arcadia, California, United States
- Inaugurated: 1957
- Race type: Thoroughbred - Flat racing
- Website: Santa Anita Park; Tokyo City Cup website

Race information
- Distance: 1 mile (8 furlongs)
- Surface: Dirt
- Track: Left-handed
- Qualification: Four-year-olds & up
- Weight: Allowance
- Purse: $85,000

The Tokyo City Cup Stakes is an American Thoroughbred horse race run annually at the beginning of April at Santa Anita Park in Arcadia, California. A Grade III event raced on dirt at a distance of 1 1/2 miles (12 furlongs), it is open to horses aged four and older.

Run as the San Bernardino Handicap prior to 2005, the race's name honors the partnership between Santa Anita Park and Ohi Racecourse in Tokyo, Japan.

The race was open to three-year-olds only in 1957 and for three-year-olds and up from 1958 through 1967. Raced on dirt at 1 1/16 miles from 1957 through 1966 and on turf at 1 1/8 miles from 1967 through 1972 and 1974 through 1978 at which point it switched back to dirt.

Beginning with the 2025 renewal, the race was shortened from 12 furlongs (1½ miles) to eight furlongs (1 mile) on the dirt. Due to the distance change, the Thoroughbred Owners and Breeders Association (TOBA) grading committee reclassified the Tokyo City Cup as a non-listed black-type event. Under TOBA rules, a race shortened in distance is treated as a new event and must be run twice at its new eight-furlong distance before becoming eligible for re-grading consideration in 2027.

Since inception it has been contested at various distances and run on both dirt and turf:

- 1 1/16 miles : 1957–1966 on dirt
- 1 1/8 miles : 1967–1972, 1974–1978 on turf
- 1 1/8 miles : 1979–2007 on dirt
- 1 1/2 miles : 2008 on dirt
- 1 mile : 2025 on dirt

The Tokyo City Cup Stakes was run in two divisions in 1971 and again in 1974.

== Records ==
Speed record:

- 2:28.79 - Big John B (2016) (at current distance of 1 1/2 miles on dirt)

Most wins:

- 3 - Del Mar Dennis (1994, 1995, 1996)

Most wins by a jockey:

- 7 - Laffit Pincay, Jr. (1967, 1968, 1971, 1974, 1979, 1985, 1989)

Most wins by a trainer:

- 12 - Charles Whittingham (1960, 1969, 1971, 1973, 1975, 1981, 1983, 1985, 1987, 1989, 1990, 1991)

Most wins by an owner:

- 4 - Trudy McCaffery & John Toffan (1994, 1995, 1996, 2002)

== Winners ==
Year	Winner	Age	Jockey	Trainer	Owner	Time
2026	Mr. A. P.	3	Emisael Jaramillo	Vladimir Cerin	Holly Wilson and David Wilson	1:36.87
2025	Privman	3	Juan Hernandez	Bob Baffert	SF Racing LLC, Starlight Racing, Madaket Stables LLC, Stonestreet Stables LLC, Bashor Racing LLC, Determined Stables, Robert E. Masterson, Front Row Club LLC, Waves Edge Capital LLC and Catherine Donovan	1:36:21
2023	Missed the Cut	4	Umberto Rispoli	John W. Sadler	Bee Zee LLC, Lanes End Racing, St. Elias Stables, LLC, Babington, Edward P., Hudson, Jr., Edward J. and Hudson, Lynne	2:32.78
2022	Heywoods Beach	5	Ramon A. Vazquez	John W. Sadler	Hronis Racing	2:31.98
2021	Tizamagician	4	Flavien Prat	Richard E. Mandella	MyRacehorse.com & Spendthrift Farm	2:32.45
2020	No race due to the COVID-19 pandemic.					
2019	Campaign	4	Rafael Bejarano	John W. Sadler	Woodford Racing LLC	2:34.73
2018	Hoppertunity	7	Flavien Prat	Bob Baffert	Michael E. Pegram	2:32.63
2017	Hard Aces	7	Santiago Gonzalez	John W. Sadler	Hronis Racing LLC	2:31.99
2016	Big John B	7	Rafael Bejarano	Philip D'Amato	Michael House	2:28.79
2015	Sky Kingdom	6	Martin Garcia	Bob Baffert	Westrock Stables	2:28.90
2014	Majestic Harbor	6	Tyler Baze	Sean McCarthy	Gallant Stable	2:29.97
2013	Sky Kingdom	4	Martin Garcia	Bob Baffert	Westrock Stables	2:30.56
2012	Dynamic Host	6	David Flores	Art Sherman	Akin/Avery/Wilbur/Sherman	2:30.22
2011	Worth Repeating	5	Martin A. Pedroza	Richard Mandella	Spendthrift Farm	2:29.23
2010	Tap It Light	6	Tyler Baze	Mike R. Mitchell	S. Anastasi/D. Capen/J. Ukegawa	2:29.62
2009	Stream Cat	6	Joseph Talamo	Patrick Biancone	Fab Oak Stable et al.	2:31.92
2008	Niagara Causeway	5	Jon Court	Leonard Powell	La Bahia Stud, Inc.	2:29.00
2007	Fairbanks	4	Richard Migliore	Todd A. Pletcher	Team Valor	1:47.87
2006	Preachinatthebar	5	Jon Court	Bob Baffert	Michael E. Pegram	1:48.14
2005	Supah Blitz	5	Victor Espinoza	Doug O'Neill	Black Saddle Stable	1:48.90
2004	Dynever	4	Corey Nakatani	Christophe Clement	Karches & Willis	1:48.07
2003	Western Pride	5	Pat Valenzuela	James K. Chapman	Carolyn Chapman	1:48.56
2002	Bosque Redondo	5	Chris McCarron	J. Paco Gonzalez	McCaffery & Toffan	1:49.11
2001	Futural	5	Garrett Gomez	Craig Dollase	Miller Trust & Weitz	1:47.87
2000	Early Pioneer	5	Matt Garcia	Vladimir Cerin	David & Holly Wilson	1:49.08
1999	Classic Cat	4	Gary Stevens	Bob Baffert	Gary M. Garber	1:47.77
1998	Budroyale	5	Matt Garcia	Ted West	Jeffrey Sengara	1:48.48
1997	Benchmark	6	Chris McCarron	Ronald W. Ellis	Pam & Martin Wygod	1:48.26
1996	Del Mar Dennis	6	Kent Desormeaux	J. Paco Gonzalez	McCaffery & Toffan	1:48.37
1995	Del Mar Dennis	5	Chris Antley	J. Paco Gonzalez	McCaffery & Toffan	1:47.27
1994	Del Mar Dennis	4	Sal Gonzalez, Jr.	J. Paco Gonzalez	McCaffery & Toffan	1:48.36
1993	Memo	6	Paul Atkinson	Richard Mandella	Stud Panter	1:47.49
1992	Another Review	4	Kent Desormeaux	Christopher Speckert	Buckland Farm	1:47.33
1991	Anshan	4	Corey Nakatani	Charles Whittingham	Sheikh Mohammed	1:47.00
1990	Ruhlmann	5	Gary Stevens	Charles Whittingham	Ann & Jerry Moss	1:47.20
1989	Ruhlmann	4	Laffit Pincay, Jr.	Charles Whittingham	Ann & Jerry Moss	1:47.20
1988	Alysheba	4	Chris McCarron	Jack Van Berg	D. & P. Scharbauer	1:47.20
1987	Judge Angelucci	4	Bill Shoemaker	Charles Whittingham	Olin B. Gentry	1:48.40
1986	Precisionist	5	Chris McCarron	L. R. Fenstermaker	Fred W. Hooper	1:47.60
1985	Greinton	4	Laffit Pincay, Jr.	Charles Whittingham	Mary J. Bradley et al.	1:47.00
1984	Journey At Sea	5	Walter Guerra	L. R. Fenstermaker	Fred W. Hooper	1:48.00
1983	The Wonder	5	Bill Shoemaker	Charles Whittingham	Alain du Breil	1:49.20
1982	Super Moment	5	Chris McCarron	Ron McAnally	Elmendorf Farm	1:48.60
1981	Borzoi	5	Bill Shoemaker	Charles Whittingham	Fluor, Chesne et al.	1:46.20
1980	Peregrinator	5	Chris McCarron	David Hofmans	Burns & Hermanson	1:47.80
1979	Star Spangled	5	Laffit Pincay, Jr.	Lazaro S. Barrera	Mill House	1:45.80
1978	J. O. Tobin	4	Steve Cauthen	Lazaro S. Barrera	George A. Pope, Jr.	1:47.80
1977	Today 'n Tomorrow	4	Sandy Hawley	Roger Clapp	Connie M. Ring	1:46.40
1976	Zanthe	7	Sandy Hawley	Robert J. Frankel	Martin Ritt	1:45.80
1975	Royal Glint	5	Bill Shoemaker	Gordon R. Potter	Dan Lasater	1:45.80
1974	Court Ruling	4	Braulio Baeza	W. P. King	Milton Polinger	1:48.40
1974	Wichita Oil	6	Laffit Pincay, Jr.	Robert J. Frankel	Marion R. Frankel	1:47.60
1973	Quack	4	Don Pierce	Charles Whittingham	Bwamazon Farm	1:49.00
1972	Golden Eagle II	7	Jerry Lambert	Jack Van Berg	Van Berg Stable, Inc.	1:46.80
1971	Bargain Day	6	Laffit Pincay, Jr.	Charles Whittingham	Forked Lightning Ranch	1:46.60
1971	Dendron	4	Jerry Lambert	Pancho Martin	Sigmund Sommer	1:47.20
1970	Governor's Party	4	Wayne Harris	Johnny Longden	Frank McMahon	1:49.60
1969	Pinjara	4	Bill Shoemaker	Charles Whittingham	Howard B. Keck	1:46.40
1968	Tiltable	4	Laffit Pincay, Jr.	James I. Nazworthy	Kerr Stables	1:49.00
1967	Sermon	4	Laffit Pincay, Jr.	Steve Ippolito	Jacnot Stable	1:47.40
1966	Native Diver	7	Jerry Lambert	Buster Millerick	M/M Lou K. Shapiro	1:40.60
1965	Real Good Deal	4	Don Pierce	T. R. Scott	M/M E. B. Johnston	1:41.80
1964	Cyrano	5	Manuel Ycaza	William J. Hirsch	Greentree Stable	1:42.20
1963	Crozier	5	Braulio Baeza	J. E. "Cotton" Tinsley	Fred W. Hooper	1:41.60
1962	Four-and-Twenty	4	Johnny Longden	Vance Longden	Alberta Ranches, Ltd.	1:48.20
1961	New Policy	4	Bill Shoemaker	John H. Adams	Ralph Lowe	1:42.00
1960	Restless Wind	4	Eddie Arcaro	Charles Whittingham	Llangollen Farm	1:42.20
1959	Terrang	6	William Boland	Carl A. Roles	Poltex Stable/R. Bond	1:42.00
1958	Terrang	5	William Boland	Carl A. Roles	Poltex Stable/R. Bond	1:42.00
1957	Lightning Jack	3	Mel Peterson	Charles B. Leavitt	Shapiro & Leavitt	1:49.20

=== Other North American Marathon races ===
On dirt:

- Brooklyn Handicap
- Fort Harrod Stakes
- Gallant Man Handicap
- Valedictory Stakes

On turf:

- Canadian International Stakes
- Carleton F. Burke Handicap
- San Juan Capistrano Invitational Handicap
