= San Rafael Stakes =

- Class: Grade III
- Location: Santa Anita Park; Arcadia, California United States
- Inaugurated: 1981
- Race type: Thoroughbred - Flat racing
- Website: www.santaanita.com

Race information
- Distance: 1 mile (8 furlongs)
- Surface: Dirt
- Track: left-handed
- Qualification: Three-year-olds
- Weight: Assigned
- Purse: $150,000

The San Rafael Stakes was an American Thoroughbred horse race run at Santa Anita Park, located in Arcadia, California. The race was a Grade III event with a purse of $150,000 and was open to three-year-olds willing to race one mile (8 furlongs) on the facility's dirt race track.

Prior to 2005, the race was held in early March. Beginning in 2005, the race was moved to mid-January to offer a better fit to trainers to race in the Sham Stakes, the Robert B. Lewis Stakes (formerly known as the Santa Catalina Stakes) and the San Felipe Stakes. It became the year's first official prep race for the U.S. Triple Crown series. However, after Conveyance's win in 2010, Santa Anita has stopped running this event.

On November 28, 2007, this Grade II stakes race was downgraded to a Grade III by the American Graded Stakes Committee.

== Records ==
Speed record:

- 1:33.37 - El Gato Malo (2008) (On Cushion Track)
- 1:34.40 - Prince Spellbound (1982) (on dirt)

Most wins by a jockey:

- 5 - Chris McCarron (1983, 1984, 1986, 1991, 2002)
- 5 - Gary Stevens (1988, 1989, 1990, 1996, 2005)

Most wins by a trainer:

- 2 - Laz S. Barrera (1985, 1990)
- 2 - Craig A. Lewis (1989, 1995)
- 2 - Neil Drysdale (1992, 2000)
- 2 - D. Wayne Lukas (1994, 1996)
- 2 - Wallace Dollase (1998, 1999)

Most wins by an owner:

- 2 - Thoroughbred Corp. (1998, 1999)

== Winners of the San Rafael Stakes ==
Year	Winner	Jockey	Trainer	Owner	Time
2010	Conveyance	Garrett Gomez	Bob Baffert	Zabeel Racing International	1:36.45
2009	The Pamplemousse	Alex Solis	Julio C. Canani	Alex Solis, Jr.	1:35.31
2008	El Gato Malo	David R. Flores	Craig Dollase	West Point Thoroughbreds	1:33.37
2007	Notional	Corey Nakatani	Doug O'Neill	J. Paul Reddam	1:36.48
2006	Brother Derek	Alex Solis	Dan Hendricks	Cecil N. Peacock	1:36.11
2005	Spanish Chestnut	Gary Stevens	Patrick Biancone	Smith & Tabor	1:36.69
2004	Imperialism	Victor Espinoza	Kristin Mulhall	Steve Taub	1:36.11
2003	Rojo Toro	Jerry Bailey	Bob Baffert	Hal Earnhardt	1:35.89
2002	Came Home	Chris McCarron	J. Paco Gonzalez	Farish et al.	1:36.24
2001	Crafty C.T.	Ed Delahoussaye	Howard Zucker	C. T. Grether, Inc.	1:35.79
2000	War Chant	Kent Desormeaux	Neil D. Drysdale	Irving & Marjorie Cowan	1:36.45
1999	Desert Hero	Corey Nakatani	Wallace Dollase	Thoroughbred Corp.	1:36.45
1998	Orville N Wilbur's	Corey Nakatani	Wallace Dollase	Thoroughbred Corp. et al.	1:35.96
1997	Funontherun	Goncalino Almeida	Melvin F. Stute	Dave & Herb Alpert	1:36.01
1996	Honour and Glory	Gary Stevens	D. Wayne Lukas	Michael Tabor	1:36.45
1995	Larry The Legend	Kent Desormeaux	Craig A. Lewis	Craig A. Lewis	1:37.61
1994	Tabasco Cat	Pat Day	D. Wayne Lukas	Overbrook & Reynolds	1:36.39
1993	Devoted Brass	Kent Desormeaux	Noble Threewitt	Don W. Jordens	1:35.13
1992	A.P. Indy	Ed Delahoussaye	Neil D. Drysdale	Tomonori Tsurumaki	1:35.41
1991	Dinard	Chris McCarron	Richard J. Lundy	Allen E. Paulson	1:35.80
1990	Mister Frisky	Gary Stevens	Laz S. Barrera	Solymar Stud	1:36.60
1989	Music Merci	Gary Stevens	Craig A. Lewis	Pendleton/Royal T. Stable	1:34.80
1988	What a Diplomat	Gary Stevens	Richard Mulhall	Meyer & Mollie Gaskin	1:38.00
1987	Masterful Advocate	Laffit Pincay, Jr.	Joseph Manzi	Belles (Lessee) & Leveton	1:35.80
1986	Variety Road	Chris McCarron	Bruce Headley	Kjell H. Qvale	1:35.60
1985	Smarten Up	Rafael Meza	Laz S. Barrera	Ryehill Farm	1:36.20
1984	Precisionist	Chris McCarron	Ross Fenstermaker	Fred W. Hooper	1:35.00
1983	Desert Wine	Chris McCarron	Jerry M. Fanning	Cardiff Stud/T90 Ranch	1:35.60
1982	Prince Spellbound	Marco Castaneda	Lester W. Holt	William L. Pease	1:34.40
1981	Johnlee n' Harold	Marco Castaneda	Hal King	Michael I. Blake	1:36.00
