= Fran's Valentine =

American Thoroughbred racehorse

- Breed: Thoroughbred
- Sire: Saros
- Grandsire: Sassafras
- Dam: Iza Valentine
- Damsire: Bicker
- Sex: mare
- Foaled: 1982
- Died: 2007
- Country: United States
- Color: Dark bay
- Breeder: Earl Scheib
- Owner: Earl Scheib, George W. Strawbridge Jr.
- Trainer: Joseph Manzi
- Earnings: $1,375,465

Major wins
- Las Virgenes Stakes (1985); Hollywood Oaks (1985); Kentucky Oaks (1985); Santa Susana Stakes (1985); Yankee Valor Handicap (1985); Chula Vista Handicap (1986); Santa Maria Handicap (1986)

Honors
- Fran's Valentine Stakes (1995– ) at Santa Anita Park
- Last updated on 27 October 2021

Fran's Valentine (1982 – October, 2007) was a Thoroughbred racehorse filly, who, in 1985 as a three-year-old, won the Graded stakes races the Hollywood Oaks, Kentucky Oaks and Santa Susana Stakes. Trained by Joseph Manzi, she was the first filly to win both the Kentucky Oaks and Hollywood Oaks. Her lifetime earnings were $1,375,465, and she had 13 wins from 34 races.

Fran's Valentine was bred at Green Thumb Farm Stables, in Chino, California by Earl Scheib, an entrepreneur who made his fortune in discounted car paint. Both of Fran's Valentine's parents, her dam Iza Valentine, and her sire, Saros, were owned by Scheib. Scheib named Fran's Valentine after his wife Fran; the filly was his favourite horse.

== Racing career ==
In November 1984, as a two-year-old, Fran's Valentine was first over the line in the inaugural Breeders' Cup Juvenile Fillies at Hollywood Park. Although she finished first by half a length, Fran's Valentine was relegated to tenth after stewards judged that she had bumped another horse at the top of the back stretch. The decision moved her jockey, Pat Valenzuela, to tears. Scheib, who was well known for starring in television commercials promoting his discount car-painting business, was asked why he was still smiling in the commercial that aired just after the race; his questioner had not realized that the commercial had been recorded in advance. Fernando Toro, the jockey of Pirate's Glow who was bumped during the race, said he could have been killed, and criticized Valenzuela's riding. The win was awarded to Outstandingly, the filly that was second across the line.

On March 2, 1985, Fran's Valentine won the Las Virgenes Stakes at Santa Anita to win $77,150. Later that month, ridden by Pat Valenzuela, she won the Grade I Santa Susana Stakes by two and a half lengths, earning $122,100. Her next race, in May 1985, was the Kentucky Oaks. Fran's Valentine was the first filly that her trainer, Joe Manzi, had entered into the Oaks, and she won in a record time for the track, again ridden by Valenzuela. The track was hard, her preferred type of surface.

In July 1985, Fran's Valentine won the Hollywood Oaks by a head over Magnificent Lindy; this was her fifth stakes victory in six starts. Chris McCarron rode her to this victory in a record time for the track of 1:47.25. In preparation for the Breeders' Cup Distaff, Fran's Valentine defeated her male counterparts in the Yankee Valor Handicap at Santa Anita Park. Her winnings were $93,300, with an additional Breeders Cup award of $27,000.

In August 1986, she won the Grade II Chula Vista Handicap on a track that was hard, and in 1987 she won the Santa Maria Handicap (Grade II).

== Retirement and stud ==
After racing, Fran's Valentine became a broodmare; six of her ten foals became winners, including With Anticipation, a Grade I winning horse who earned over $2.6 million in his career. After having her third foal, she was bought by George W. Strawbridge Jr.

Fran's Valentine was retired to Derry Meeting Farm, Cochranville, Pennsylvania, where she lived until she was euthanized at the age of 25 due to infirmities of old age.
