= Ruhlmann =

American-bred Thoroughbred racehorse

- Sire: Mr. Leader
- Grandsire: Hail To Reason
- Dam: Indian Maiden
- Damsire: Chieftain
- Sex: Stallion
- Foaled: 1985
- Country: United States
- Colour: Brown
- Breeder: North Ridge Farm
- Owner: Ann & Jerry Moss
- Trainer: André Fabre (at 2 in France); Robert J. Frankel (1988); Charles E. Whittingham (1989–1990)
- Record: 27: 10-3-4
- Earnings: US$1,824,353

Major wins
- El Camino Real Derby (1988); Jamaica Handicap (1988); San Bernardino Handicap (1989, 1990); Mervyn Leroy Handicap (1989); Native Diver Handicap (1989); Viking Spirit Stakes (1989); Santa Anita Handicap (1990)
- Last updated on January 1, 2010

Ruhlmann (April 22, 1985 – December 24, 2008) was an American millionaire Thoroughbred racehorse who holds the track record of 1:33.4 for one mile on dirt set on March 5, 1989, at Santa Anita Park in Arcadia, California.

== Racing career ==
First raced in France as a two-year-old for trainer André Fabre, Ruhlmann was a difficult horse to handle. In three starts, he ran second in his debut at Chantilly Racecourse then finished seventh in his next two outings. Sent to the United States, his training was taken over by Robert Frankel for owners, Ann & Jerry. As a three-year-old, Ruhlmann set a new stakes record time of 1:39 2/5 for 1^{1}/16 miles on dirt in winning the 1988 El Camino Real Derby at Bay Meadows Racetrack. His winning time was nearly two seconds faster than the previous record set by Tank's Prospect in 1985. He was then made the betting favorite for the Florida Derby but Ruhlmann bled from the lungs during the race. He was put on Lasix for the Santa Anita Derby but finished eighth and then in the April 23 California Derby at Golden Gate Fields, he clipped heels with another horse and went down. Ruhlmann's injuries forced him to miss the 1988 U. S. Triple Crown series and kept him out of racing until September. In November, Ruhlmann finished ninth in the Breeders' Cup Sprint at Churchill Downs and his owner transferred him to trainer Charlie Whittingham.

As a four-year-old under Whittingham's handling, Ruhlmann won his first start of the year on March 5, taking the Viking Spirit Stakes at Santa Anita Park in track record time for one mile on dirt. He went on to win the first of his two consecutive editions of the San Bernardino Handicap plus the Mervyn Leroy and Native Diver Handicaps.

In 1990, Ruhlmann won the most important race of his career when he defeated Criminal Type to win the Santa Anita Handicap. He then followed up with another win over Criminal Type for his second straight victory in the San Bernardino Handicap.

== Stud career ==
Retired to stud duty, the still high-strung Ruhlmann met with modest success as a sire of 121 race winners, including five stakes race winners. He stood at Fox Hollow Farm in Texas until being pensioned in December, 2004 then was sent to Old Friends Equine, Dream Chase Farm in Georgetown, Kentucky in 2005. He died there from an aneurysm at age twenty-three on Christmas Eve 2008.
