= Cause to Believe =

American-bred Thoroughbred racehorse

- Sire: Maria's Mon
- Grandsire: Wavering Monarch
- Dam: Imaginary Cat
- Damsire: Storm Cat
- Sex: Stallion
- Foaled: 2003
- Country: United States
- Colour: Gray
- Breeder: Overbrook Farm
- Owner: Peter Redekop & Peter Abruzzo
- Trainer: Jerry Hollendorfer
- Record: 17: 6-4-2
- Earnings: $421,543

Major wins
- Mill Valley Stakes (2005); El Camino Real Derby (2006); California Derby (2006)

Cause to Believe (foaled February 11, 2003 in Kentucky) is an American Thoroughbred racehorse. He was a contender for the U.S. Triple Crown in 2006.

Cause to Believe was bred by Overbrook Farm. He is the son of Maria's Mon, the 1995 American Champion Two-Year-Old Colt. Out of the mare Imaginary Cat, a daughter of Storm Cat, his breeding line includes such notable horses as Northern Dancer, Secretariat and Majestic Prince.

Cause to Believe was purchased by Vancouver, British Columbia businessman Peter Redekop for $30,000 at the 2005 Ocala Breeders' Sales Co. March Selected Two-Year-Olds in Training Sale. In early 2006, Redekop sold a 25% interest in the horse to Chicago businessman, Peter Abruzzo.

The colt was trained by Jerry Hollendorfer and ridden by Russell Baze.

== Races ==
Finish	Race	Distance	Track	Condition
13th	Kentucky Derby	One and One-Quarter Miles	Churchill Downs	Fast
3rd	Illinois Derby	One and One-Eighth Miles	Hawthorne Race Course	Fast
1st	California Derby	One and One-Sixteenth Miles	Golden Gate Fields	Fast
1st	El Camino Real Derby	One and One-Sixteenth Miles	Bay Meadows	Fast
2nd	San Miguel Stakes	Six Furlongs	Santa Anita Park	Fast
1st	Mill Valley Stakes	Six Furlongs	Golden Gate Fields	Fast
1st	Bay Meadows Juvenile	One Mile	Bay Meadows	Fast
1st	Cavonnier Juvenile	Five and One-Half Furlongs	Sonoma County Fair	Fast
2nd	Malcom Anderson Stakes	Five Furlongs	Golden Gate Fields	Fast
1st	Maiden	Four and One-Half Furlongs	Golden Gate Fields	Fast
2nd	Maiden	Four and One-Half Furlongs	Golden Gate Fields	Fast
