= Rafael Meza =

American jockey

Personal information
- Born: February 19, 1958 (age 68) Tijuana, Mexico
- Occupation: Jockey

Horse racing career
- Sport: Horse racing

Major racing wins
- Del Mar Derby (1983); Speakeasy Stakes (1983); El Conejo Handicap (1984); Frank E. Kilroe Mile Handicap (1984); Mervyn Leroy Handicap (1984); San Luis Obispo Handicap (1984); Santa Catalina Stakes (1984); Bay Meadows Handicap (1985); Hawthorne Gold Cup Handicap (1985); San Diego Handicap (1985); San Rafael Stakes (1985); Autumn Days Handicap (1985, 1989); Stuyvesant Handicap (1985); Excelsior Handicap (1986); Las Virgenes Stakes (1986); Metropolitan Handicap (1986); New Orleans Handicap (1986); San Fernando Stakes (1986); Westchester Handicap (1986); Comely Stakes (1987); Del Mar Oaks (1988); San Simeon Handicap (1988); Morvich Handicap (1989); San Carlos Handicap (1989); Bing Crosby Handicap (1990); Eddie Read Stakes (1990); Oak Tree Invitational Stakes (1990); Pat O'Brien Handicap (1990); Golden Gate Handicap (1991); El Camino Real Derby (1993); Bay Meadows Derby (1997, 1999); California Derby (1998); Yerba Buena Handicap (2000)

Significant horses
- Garthorn, Snow Chief, Super Diamond

Rafael Q. Meza (born February 19, 1958) is an American retired jockey who competed in Thoroughbred horse racing in the United States.

A native of Tijuana, Mexico, Meza began riding in California near the end of the 1970s. and would spend his career riding from a base in that State. In 1982 he was the second- leading rider at the spring/summer meeting at Golden Gate Fields and enjoyed his best year in racing in 1986 when he won six important races at tracks in California, New York and Louisiana.
