= Swept Overboard =

American thoroughbred racehorse

- Sire: End Sweep
- Grandsire: Forty Niner
- Dam: Sheer Ice
- Damsire: Cutlass
- Sex: Stallion
- Foaled: 1997
- Died: 2017
- Country: USA
- Colour: Gray/Roan
- Breeder: Harry T. Mangurian Jr.
- Owner: J. Paul Reddam
- Trainer: Craig Dollase
- Record: 20:8-5-3
- Earnings: $1,137,767

Major wins
- San Miguel Stakes (2000); San Pedro Stakes (2000); Ancient Title Stakes (2001); Hollywood Turf Express Handicap; Robert K. Kerlan Memorial Handicap (2001); Metropolitan Handicap (2002)
- Last updated on 2020-01-18

Swept Overboard (February 6, 1997 - November 1, 2017) was an American Thoroughbred racehorse and the winner of the 2002 Metropolitan Handicap.

== Career ==
Swept Overboard's first race was on October 9, 1999, at Santa Anita, where he came in 2nd place.

He then went on a three race win streak, starting off the year 2000 with wins at the San Miguel Stakes and the San Pedro Stakes.

Starting with his win at the June 23rd, 2001 Robert K. Kerlan Memorial Handicap, he began competing only in graded races.

He picked up his next big win on October 6, 2001, by winning the Ancient Title Stakes. He then picked up another win to close the year by winning the November 23rd, 2001, Hollywood Turf Express Handicap.

He picked up the final win of his career by winning the 2002 Metropolitan Handicap. He then finished out his career with a 4th place finish at the 2002 Ancient Title Stakes and an 8th place finish at the 2002 Breeders' Cup Sprint.

== Stud career ==
At the end of his racing career Swept Overboard was sold to Japanese interests where he stood at stud at Shadai Stallion Station in 2003 then in 2008 was moved to Breeders Stallion Station.

Swept Overboard's descendants include:

c = colt, f = filly

| Foaled | Name | Sex | Major Wins |
| 2004 | Urban Street | f | Silk Road Stakes |
| 2007 | Pas de Trois | f | Hakodate Sprint Stakes |
| 2008 | A Shin Blanc | f | Hyogo Championship |
| 2011 | Red Falx | f | Sprinters Stakes |
| 2015 | Omega Perfume | f. | Tokyo Daishōten (4 times in a row) |

== Pedigree ==
Pedigree of Swept Overboard (USA), 1997
| Sire End Sweep (USA) 1991 | Forty Niner (USA); 1985 | Mr. Prospector | Raise a Native |
| Sire End Sweep (USA) 1991 | Forty Niner (USA); 1985 | Mr. Prospector | Gold Digger |
| Sire End Sweep (USA) 1991 | Forty Niner (USA); 1985 | File | Tom Rolfe |
| Sire End Sweep (USA) 1991 | Forty Niner (USA); 1985 | File | Continue |
| Sire End Sweep (USA) 1991 | Broom Dance (USA); 1979 | Dance Spell | Northern Dancer |
| Sire End Sweep (USA) 1991 | Broom Dance (USA); 1979 | Dance Spell | Obeah |
| Sire End Sweep (USA) 1991 | Broom Dance (USA); 1979 | Witching Hour | Thinking Cap |
| Sire End Sweep (USA) 1991 | Broom Dance (USA); 1979 | Witching Hour | Enchanted Eve |
| Dam Sheer Ice (USA) 1982 | Cutlass (USA); 1970 | Damascus | Sword Dancer |
| Dam Sheer Ice (USA) 1982 | Cutlass (USA); 1970 | Damascus | Kerala |
| Dam Sheer Ice (USA) 1982 | Cutlass (USA); 1970 | Aphonia | Dunce |
| Dam Sheer Ice (USA) 1982 | Cutlass (USA); 1970 | Aphonia | Gambetta |
| Dam Sheer Ice (USA) 1982 | Hey Dolly A (USA); 1974 | Ambehaving | Ambiorix |
| Dam Sheer Ice (USA) 1982 | Hey Dolly A (USA); 1974 | Ambehaving | Dentifrice |
| Dam Sheer Ice (USA) 1982 | Hey Dolly A (USA); 1974 | Swift Deal | Native Charger |
| Dam Sheer Ice (USA) 1982 | Hey Dolly A (USA); 1974 | Swift Deal | Miss Barter |
