= Mollie McCarty =

American thoroughbred racehorse

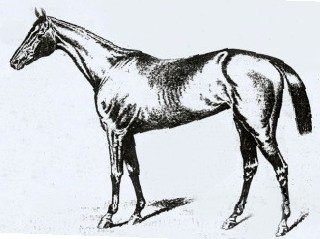
- Sire: Monday
- Grandsire: Colton
- Dam: Hennie Farrow
- Damsire: Shamrock (iiu)
- Sex: Mare
- Foaled: 1873
- Country: US (California)
- Colour: Bay
- Breeder: Adolph Mallard
- Owner: Theodore Winters; Lucky Baldwin
- Trainer: Bud Doble (for Baldwin)
- Record: 17: 15-2-0

Major wins
- California Derby (1876); Garden City Cup (1879)
- Last updated on 22 February 2011

Mollie McCarty (sometimes spelled Mollie McCarthy) foaled in 1873, was an outstanding California-based Thoroughbred racehorse who won her first 13 race starts and was second on the two occasions when she was defeated.

== Breeding ==
Mollie McCarty was by bred by Adolph Mallard and was by Monday (by Colton, by Lexington), who had broken down early in his career, but when standing in Marin County, California, he sired Mollie McCarty as well as Joe Hooker, sire of the good filly, Yo Tambien (bred by Winters). Her dam, Hennie Farrow (1853) by Shamrock (imported in utero), was a good broodmare who also produced Mayflower (1867, by Eclipse, dam of Joe Hooker.), Shannon (grandsire of Racine, a track and national record holder), Electra (1871, a mare by Eclipse, that established a good family), and Flood (1877, a good racehorse and sire). Hennie Farrow, had been owned for years by a Californian named J. B. Chase. They were from the old American, A10 family which was traced to the Harrison of Brandon Mare.

== Racing career ==
Winning her first and only start as a two-year-old, at three Mollie won six consecutive races. Two of these wins were on the same day: September 8, 1876 at the Agricultural Park in Sacramento, California. At the end of her second season she won a $10,000 purse in a four-heat race in San Francisco, California for females of all ages. There was a clause in that race which effectively said that if a horse was distanced (meaning they'd given up or were so far behind they might as well give up), no prize would be awarded. Mollie distanced all but one of her rivals in the first heat. By this, she saved the track the trouble of paying out third and fourth place money. She also won the California Derby in 1876. Mollie McCarty was raced until she was four exclusively in California for Theodore Winters (called Black T because of his huge black moustache).

At age four, she started in another four-mile heat. Again she outdistanced all but one horse named Bazar. Again she saved the track money. She then went on to win four more races, although a big race (meaning a big purse) was cancelled on February 22, 1877, due to bad weather. Instead, on March 2, Mollie was entered into a two-mile match against Jake, again in Sacramento. Though they were the same age, she conceded 14 pounds to Jake. Because Jake's rider couldn't make the weight, Mollie's 14 pounds was reduced to 11 pounds, and she beat Jake in straight heats.

=== The match race ===
When Mollie McCarty was undefeated after thirteen races, Winters sold her to Lucky Baldwin. Baldwin sent her to Kentucky, the first California horse ever sent east, a long, difficult journey by train. Due to public demand that the best in the west should race the best in the east (at least 30,000 people showed up on the day: July 4, 1878), Bud Doble, training for Baldwin, sent her out against Ten Broeck. Like Mollie in the west, Ten Broeck, owned and bred by John Harper, had run out of competition in the east. John Harper had developed the Nantura Stud, breeding and owning the great Longfellow. Ten Broeck was the eastern champion and held six records for distances ranging from one to four miles. In his last two racing seasons, Ten Broeck had recorded 16 wins and 2 seconds from his 18 starts.

Ten Broeck and Mollie McCarty met in the four-mile match race at Louisville Jockey Club (now Churchill Downs) in Louisville, Kentucky. On that day, Mollie suffered her first ever defeats in the first and last heats of the three-heat four-mile race. It seems that not only was the course mostly mud due to heavy rain the night before, which did not suit Mollie, but she could have been ridden better. It seems possible Ten Broeck had been doped. A book written by Colonel John F. Wall called Famous Running Horses records that Ten Broeck was laboring badly, did not sweat, was glassy eyed, and had to be whipped through the match. Whether this story is true or not, this was Ten Broeck's last race. It was also the last race of its kind, and the end of an era. American horse racing was now turning to the shorter English-style "dash" races rather than long grueling match races.

Mollie McCarty was again defeated in the Minneapolis Cup. In her last season, she won the Garden City Cup in Chicago, Illinois and a purse race in San Francisco.

== Stud record ==
Mollie was retired to Baldwin's Rancho Santa Anita, (later part of Santa Anita Park). Here she produced:

- Fallen Leaf (1881 filly by Grinstead), is a race winner whose female descendants produced winners, over several generations.
- Brandy-Wine, a colt by Lexingtor (by Lexington)
- Mollie's Last, by Rutherford (Australian) was a stakes winner in California.

She died on March 15, 1883, soon after foaling Mollie's Last.

== Honors ==
The match race was immortalized in the bluegrass music song: Molly and Tenbrooks. The song has a number of other names, among them Run, Molly, Run, and it came about because Mollie had raced against the Eastern champion Ten Broeck in an 1878 match race.

== See also ==
- List of leading Thoroughbred racehorses
