= Mill Valley Stakes =

The Mill Valley Stakes is an American Thoroughbred horse race run each year at Golden Gate Fields. An ungraded stakes, it's open to horses three years old and older.

The race is named for a small town in Marin County across the San Francisco Bay from the site of Golden Gate Fields. Mill Valley, once a mill sending lumber to build San Francisco, is now a bustling community of many thousands.

This race is not listed as running for the time being.

== Past winners ==
- 2006 - Cause to Believe
