= Ollie's Candy =

American thoroughbred racehorse

- Sire: Candy Ride
- Grandsire: Ride the Rails
- Dam: Afternoon Stroll
- Damsire: Stroll
- Sex: Mare
- Foaled: March 20, 2015
- Country: United States
- Colour: Dark bay or brown
- Breeder: Paul Eggert & Karen Eggert
- Owner: Paul Eggert & Karen Eggert
- Trainer: John W. Sadler
- Jockey: Flavien Prat
- Record: 14:4-5-3
- Earnings: $830,151

Major wins
- Summertime Oaks (2018); Clement L. Hirsch Stakes (2019)

Ollie's Candy (foaled April 27, 2015) is an American Thoroughbred racehorse and the winner of the 2019 Clement L. Hirsch Stakes.

== Career ==
Ollie Candy's first race was on April 22, 2018, at Golden Gate, where she came in first in a Maiden Special Weight race. She picked up another win on May 13, 2018, when she won an Allowance Optional Claiming race at Golden Gate.

On June 16, 2018, she competed in and won her first graded race - the Grade-2 2018 Summertime Oaks. She came in as the 3:1 underdog and beat Thirteen Squared by a neck. She finished her 2018 season with 2nd-place finishes at both the July San Clemente Stakes and the August Del Mar Oaks.

She began her 2019 season on May 27, 2019, when she finished a disappointing 7th at the Grade-1 Gamely Stakes. She had a better showing at the June 22nd, 2019 Grade-3 Wilshire Stakes as the 2:1 favorite, but was defeated by Great Britain's Simply Breathless.

She won her first and only Grade-1 race to date when she won the July 28th, 2019, Clement L. Hirsch Stakes. She defeated 6:5 favorite Secret Spice by a head. This was her last victory of the year as she finished in 3rd at the September 29th, 2019 Grade-2 Zenyatta Stakes and 4th at the November 2nd, 2019, Breeders' Cup Distaff.

Her 2020 season began with another series of close calls as she finished on the podium in four different Grade-1 races, but was unable to secure victory.

== Pedigree ==
Pedigree of Ollie's Candy (USA), 2015
Sire Candy Ride (ARG) b. 1999	Ride the Rails (USA) b. 1991	Cryptoclearance	Fappiano
Sire Candy Ride (ARG) b. 1999	Ride the Rails (USA) b. 1991	Cryptoclearance	Naval Orange
Sire Candy Ride (ARG) b. 1999	Ride the Rails (USA) b. 1991	Herbalesian	Herbager
Sire Candy Ride (ARG) b. 1999	Ride the Rails (USA) b. 1991	Herbalesian	Alanesian
Sire Candy Ride (ARG) b. 1999	Candy Girl (ARG) b. 1990	Candy Stripes	Blushing Groom
Sire Candy Ride (ARG) b. 1999	Candy Girl (ARG) b. 1990	Candy Stripes	Bubble Company
Sire Candy Ride (ARG) b. 1999	Candy Girl (ARG) b. 1990	City Girl	Farnesio
Sire Candy Ride (ARG) b. 1999	Candy Girl (ARG) b. 1990	City Girl	Cithara
Dam Afternoon Stroll (USA) b. 2006	Stroll (USA) b. 2000	Pulpit	A.P. Indy
Dam Afternoon Stroll (USA) b. 2006	Stroll (USA) b. 2000	Pulpit	Preach
Dam Afternoon Stroll (USA) b. 2006	Stroll (USA) b. 2000	Maid for Walking	Prince Sabo
Dam Afternoon Stroll (USA) b. 2006	Stroll (USA) b. 2000	Maid for Walking	Stinging Nettle
Dam Afternoon Stroll (USA) b. 2006	Gertie (USA) b. 1995	Danzatore	Northern Dancer
Dam Afternoon Stroll (USA) b. 2006	Gertie (USA) b. 1995	Danzatore	Shake a Leg
Dam Afternoon Stroll (USA) b. 2006	Gertie (USA) b. 1995	Granny Ruth	Key to the Mint
Dam Afternoon Stroll (USA) b. 2006	Gertie (USA) b. 1995	Granny Ruth	Best of My Love
