= Iza Valentine =

American Thoroughbred racehorse

- Breed: Thoroughbred
- Sire: Bicker
- Grandsire: Round Table
- Dam: Countess Market
- Damsire: Count of Honor
- Sex: mare
- Foaled: 1976
- Died: August 6, 2009 (aged 33)
- Country: United States
- Earnings: $69,500

Iza Valentine (1976–2009) was an American Thoroughbred racing filly best known for coming in second in the 1980 Las Madrinas Handicap and coming in third in the 1980 Bangles and Beads Stakes. Her total career earnings were $69,500, and she won five races from 25 starts. Her greater success was as a broodmare; she was California Broodmare of the Year in 1985.

Iza Valentine's first foal was multiple stakes winner Fran's Valentine (sired by Saros), who won the Kentucky Oaks and Hollywood Oaks. Iza Valentine was also the dam of Iz A Saros and Carsonality.

In November 2004, she retired to Our Mims Retirement Haven, Kentucky, where she lived until failing health led to her euthanasia on August 6, 2009.
