= Jaklin Klugman =

American Thoroughbred racehorse

- Sire: Orbit Ruler
- Grandsire: Our Rulla
- Dam: The End All
- Damsire: Promised Land
- Sex: Stallion
- Foaled: 1977
- Country: United States
- Colour: Gray
- Breeder: John Dominguez and Jack Klugman
- Owner: Jack Klugman
- Trainer: Riley S. Cofer
- Record: 19: 10-2-2
- Earnings: $478,878

Major wins
- California Breeders' Champion Stakes (1979); California Derby (1980); Stepping Stone Purse (1980); Hawthorne Derby (1980); Jerome Handicap (1980); Syrian Sea Handicap (1980)

Awards
- California Horse of the Year (1980)
- Last updated on May 24, 2007

Jaklin Klugman (1977–1996) was an American Thoroughbred racehorse. He was owned and bred in California by John Dominguez and actor Jack Klugman. He showed promise as a two-year-old, winning the California Breeders' Champion Stakes. At age three, after winning the California Derby at Golden Gate Fields in March, he raced in the Kentucky Derby.

Ridden by Champion jockey Darrel McHargue in the 1980 Kentucky Derby, Jaklin Klugman ran third to winner Genuine Risk. That year, he also finished second in the then-Grade I Vosburgh Stakes and third in the Marlboro Cup Invitational Handicap before winning the Jerome Handicap and the Hawthorne Derby in the fall. His performances earned him 1980 California Horse of the Year honors.

In May 1981, Jaklin Klugman was syndicated for $4 million.

Retired to stud duty, Jaklin Klugman stood at a ranch in Temecula, California, which was purchased by owner Jack Klugman and named El Rancho de Jaklin. Among his offspring was Sky Jack, who won the 2002 Hollywood Gold Cup.

Jaklin Klugman died in March 1996 from a ruptured aorta at El Rancho de Jaklin.
