= Shared Belief Stakes =

- Class: Listed
- Location: Del Mar Racetrack; Del Mar, California, United States
- Inaugurated: 1973
- Race type: Thoroughbred - Flat racing
- Website: www.dmtc.com

Race information
- Distance: 1 mile (8 furlongs)
- Surface: Dirt
- Track: left-handed
- Qualification: Three-years-old
- Weight: Assigned
- Purse: $100,000

The Shared Belief Stakes (formerly the El Cajon Stakes) is a Listed American Thoroughbred horse race run annually during the last week of August or the first week of September at Del Mar Racetrack in Del Mar, California. Open to three-year-old horses, the event is contested at a distance of one mile (8 furlongs) on the dirt. The purse is currently $100,000.

The race is named for champion Shared Belief, whose major wins included the 2014 Pacific Classic at Del Mar. It was previously named for the city of El Cajon, California.

Inaugurated in 1973, the race was run as a restricted overnight stakes until 2004. The distance was set at one and one-eighth miles in 1973 and 1974, then reduced to a mile and a sixteenth from 1975 through 1996 after which it was set at its current distance of one mile. From 2008 to 2015, the race was run on Polytrack synthetic dirt surface – all other renewals have been on a natural dirt surface.

The race was not run in 1994 and 2001.

== Past winners ==
- 2025 - Citizen Bull
- 2024 - Muth
- 2023 - Tahoe Sunrise
- 2022 - Go Joe Won
- 2021 - Medina Spirit
- 2020 - Thousand Words
- 2019 - Improbable
- 2018 - Tatters To Riches
- 2017 - Battle of Midway
- 2016 - Accelerate
- 2015 - Gimme Da Lute
- 2014 - Red Outlaw
- 2013 - Holy Lute
- 2012 - Fed Biz
- 2011 - Celestic Night
- 2010 - Haimish Way
- 2009 - Grazen
- 2008 - Slews Tiznow
- 2007 - Rush with Thunder
- 2006 - Cindago
- 2005 - Follow the Rainbow
- 2004 - Perfect Moon
- 2003 - Excess Summer
- 2002 - Joey Franco
- 2001 - RACE NOT RUN
- 2000 - Spicy Stuff
- 1999 - National Saint
- 1998 - Opine
- 1997 - Best Star
- 1996 - Ready to Order
- 1995 - Turbulent Dancer
- 1994 - RACE NOT RUN
- 1993 - Pleasant Tango
- 1992 - Slerp
- 1991 - Letthebighossroll (California Champion sprinter)
- 1990 - Asia
- 1989 - Bruho
- 1988 - Old Exclusive
- 1987 - Sebrof
- 1986 - Tasso (1985 American Champion Two-Year-Old Colt)
- 1985 - Nostalgias Star
- 1984 - Bunker
- 1983 - Mamaison
- 1982 - Craelius
- 1981 - Island Whirl
- 1980 - Mighty Return
- 1979 - Shamgo
- 1978 - Go West Young Man (Multiple Grade I winner)
- 1977 - Kulak
- 1976 - Wood Green
- 1975 - Crumbs
- 1974 - Within Hail
- 1973 - Quick Bluff
