= California Horse of the Year =

American horse racing honor

The California Horse of the Year is an American horse racing honor awarded annually since 1973 by the California Thoroughbred Breeders Association (CTBA) to a Thoroughbred racehorse bred in the state of California.

== Winners ==
- 2024 - The Chosen Vron
- 2023 - The Chosen Vron
- 2022 - Fun To Dream
- 2021 - Lieutenant Dan
- 2020 - Mucho Unusual
- 2019 - Spiced Perfection
- 2018 - Spiced Perfection
- 2017 - Sircat Sally
- 2016 - California Chrome
- 2015 - Gimme Da Lute
- 2014 - California Chrome
- 2013- Points Offthebench
- 2012- Acclamation
- 2011 - Acclamation
- 2010- Evening Jewel
- 2009 - California Flag & Dancing in Silks (tie)
- 2008 - Bob Black Jack
- 2007 - Nashoba's Key
- 2006 - Lava Man
- 2005 - Lava Man
- 2004 - Moscow Burning
- 2003 - Joey Franco
- 2002 - Continental Red
- 2001 - Tiznow
- 2000 - Tiznow
- 1999 - Budroyale
- 1998 - Free House
- 1997 - Free House
- 1996 - Cavonnier
- 1995 - Cat's Cradle
- 1994 - Soviet Problem
- 1993 - Bertrando
- 1992 - Best Pal
- 1991 - Best Pal
- 1990 - Best Pal
- 1989 - Brown Bess
- 1988 - King Glorious
- 1987 - Snow Chief
- 1986 - Snow Chief
- 1985 - Snow Chief
- 1984 - Silveyville
- 1983 - Fali Time
- 1982 - Prince Spellbound
- 1981 - Eleven Stitches
- 1980 - Jaklin Klugman
- 1979 - Golden Act
- 1978 - Flying Paster
- 1977 - Crystal Water
- 1976 - Crystal Water
- 1975 - Ancient Title
- 1974 - Ancient Title
- 1973 - Windy's Daughter
