= 1980 Kentucky Derby =

Horse race

106th Kentucky Derby
- Kentucky Derby
- Grade I stakes race
- Location: Churchill Downs
- Date: May 3, 1980
- Winning horse: Genuine Risk
- Jockey: Jacinto Vásquez
- Trainer: LeRoy Jolley
- Owner: Diana Firestone
- Conditions: Fast
- Surface: Dirt
- Attendance: 131,859

The 1980 Kentucky Derby was the 106th running of the Kentucky Derby. The race took place on May 3, 1980, with 131,859 people in attendance.

== Full results ==
Finished	Post	Horse	Jockey	Trainer	Owner	Time / behind
1st	8	Genuine Risk	Jacinto Vásquez	LeRoy Jolley	Diana Firestone	
2nd	7	Rumbo	Laffit Pincay Jr.	Thomas R. Bell Jr.	Gayno Stable and Bell Bloodstock Co.	
3rd	2	Jaklin Klugman	Darrel McHargue	Riley S. Cofer	Jack Klugman & John Dominguez	
4th	3	Super Moment	Donald Pierce	Ron McAnally	Elmendorf Farm	
5th	5	Rockhill Native	John Oldham	Herbert K. Stevens	Harry A. Oak	
6th	1	Bold 'n Ruling	Pat Valenzuela	Melvin F. Stute	Hughes Brothers	
7th	9	Plugged Nickle	Buck Thornburg	Thomas Joseph Kelly	John M. Schiff	
8th	4	Degenerate Jon	Ruben Hernandez	Joseph Trovato	Barry K. Schwartz	
9th	10	Withholding	Michael Morgan	Ronnie G. Warren	Russell Michael Jr.	
10th	12	Tonka Wakhan	Melvin Holland	Glen P. Bernis	Glenn Bromagen	
11th	11	Execution's Reason	Randy Romero	J. Bert Sonnier	Howard B. Noonan	
12th	6	Gold Stage	Ángel Cordero Jr.	William Curtis Jr.	Mrs. Philip B. Hofmann	
13th	13	Hazard Duke	Donald Brumfield	David C. Kassen	Andrew Adams	
