= Hollywood Turf Express Handicap =

American Thoroughbred horse race

The Hollywood Turf Express Handicap is an American Thoroughbred horse race run annually during the second half of November at Hollywood Park Racetrack in Inglewood, California. Formerly a Grade III event raced at a distance of six furlongs on turf, it is open to horses age three and older. The race was not eligible for grading in 2011. The race currently offers a purse of $150,000.

There was no race run in 2005 due to condition problems with the Hollywood Park turf course.

In 2013, there was a triple dead-heat for second place between No Silent, Chips All In, and Unbridled's Note. The race was won by Boat Trip.

== Winners since 1999 ==
Year	Winner	Age	Jockey	Trainer	Owner	Time
2013	Boat Trip	4	Joseph Talamo	Michael V. Pender	Jim Hirschmann & B.J. Wright	1:08.45
2009	2012	Race not held				
2008	California Flag	4	Joseph Talamo	Brian Koriner	Hi Card ranch	1:08.81
2007	Unusual Suspect	3	Tyler Baze	Barry Abrams	Barry, David & Dyan Abrams	1:09.06
2006	Jungle Prince	5	Agapito Delgadillo	Juan J. Garcia	J. D. Burk & J. A. Sciarr	1:08.76
2005	Race not held					
2004	Cajun Beat	4	Ramon Dominguez	Robert J. Frankel	Padua Stables et al.	1:02.08
2003	King Robyn	3	Tyler Baze	Jeff Mullins	Cornejo Racing	1:02.08
2002	Texas Glitter	6	John Velazquez	Todd Pletcher	M. J. Ryan & D. B. Swartz	1:01.52
2001	Swept Overboard	4	Ed Delahoussaye	Craig Dollase	J. Paul Reddam	1:01.86
2000	El Cielo	6	Corey Nakatani	Craig Dollase	Miller Trust & partners	1:01.73
1999	Mr. Doubledown	5	Victor Espinoza	Jeffrey L. Bonde	Cindy Olsen & Jack Retzloff	1:01.98
