= San Miguel Stakes =

- Class: Discontinued stakes
- Location: Santa Anita Park; Arcadia, California, United States
- Inaugurated: 1956
- Race type: Thoroughbred - Flat racing

Race information
- Distance: 6 furlongs
- Surface: Dirt
- Track: left-handed
- Qualification: Three-year-olds
- Purse: $70,000

The San Miguel Stakes was American Thoroughbred horse race run between 1956 and 2009 at Santa Anita Park in Arcadia, California. A race for three-year-olds, it was contested on dirt until its final two years when the synthetic Cushion Track was installed. It was raced at a distance of 7 furlongs in its 1956 inaugural then at 6 furlongs in 1957 and at 6.5 furlongs from 1958 through 1963 after which it reverted permanently to six furlongs.

Tompion came in third, and T.V. Lark placed in 1960. Linda's Chief won and Ancient Title placed in 1973. Bold Forbes placed in 1976. A filly, Motivity, won in 1981. Precisionist won in 1984.

The final running of the San Miguel Stakes took place on March 28, 2009.

== Records ==
Speed record:

- 1:08.22 @ 6 furlongs : Prince Wild (1991)

Most wins by a jockey:

- 6 - Bill Shoemaker (1960, 1964, 1966, 1971, 1977, 1980)

Most wins by a trainer:

- 3 - Ross Fenstermaker (1979, 1981, 1984)
- 3 - D. Wayne Lukas (1996, 1999, 2005)
- 3 - Bob Baffert (2002, 2006, 2007)

Most wins by an owner:

- 4 - Fred W. Hooper (1962, 1979, 1981, 1984)

== Winners ==
Year	Winner	Age	Jockey	Trainer	Owner	Dist. (Miles)	Time	Win$	Gr.
2009	Triumphant Flight	3	Victor Espinoza	Eric Kruljac	Tyler Seltzer	6 F	1:09.54	$57,480	BT
2008	Salute the Sarge	3	Michael Baze	Eric Guillot	Southern Equine Stable LLC (Michael Moreno & Eric Guillot)	6 F	1:09.07	$46,800	LR
2007	EZ Warrior	3	David Flores	Bob Baffert	Zayat Stables	6 F	1:08.82	$48,000	LR
2006	Too Much Bling	3	Garrett Gomez	Bob Baffert	Stonerside Stable & Blazing Meadow Farm	6 F	1:08.59	$48,720	LR
2005	Going Wild	3	Mike E. Smith	D. Wayne Lukas	Robert & Beverly Lewis	6 F	1:09.62	$64,140	LR
2004	Hosco	3	Tyler Baze	Douglas F. O'Neill	Rod & Lorraine Rodriguez	6 F	1:09.36	$64,860	G3
2003	Omega Code	3	Martin Pedroza	Wesley A. Ward	Mike Moore, Dan Butler, Wesley Ward	6 F	1:08.65	$64,680	G3
2002	Popular	3	Victor Espinoza	Bob Baffert	The Thoroughbred Corp.	6 F	1:09.00	$64,740	G3
2001	Lasersport	3	Corey Nakatani	Darrell Vienna	Herrick Racing Stable (Donna & William J. Herrick)	6 F	1:08.60	$64,500	G3
2000	Swept Overboard	3	Eddie Delahoussaye	John Shirreffs	505 Farms	6 F	1:08.99	$64,320	G3
1999	Cape Canaveral	3	David Flores	D. Wayne Lukas	Overbrook Farm	6 F	1:09.15	$62,760	G3
1998	Rio Oro	3	Dario A. Lozoya	Debi Ferguson	Larry D. Wells	6 F	1:08.60	$66,180	LR
1997	Thisnearlywasmine	3	Chris McCarron	Randy Bradshaw	Jan, Mace & Samantha Siegel	6 F	1:08.55	$64,350	LR
1996	Honour And Glory	3	Gary Stevens	D. Wayne Lukas	Michael Tabor	6 F	1:08.93	$64,350	LR
1995	Petionville	3	Chris Antley	Randy Bradshaw	Everest Stables (Jeffrey L. Nielsen)	6 F	1:09.16	$45,225	
1994	Mr. Cooperative	3	Martin Pedroza	Donald Roberts	Kanichi Ando, Alan Klein, John Woo	6 F	1:09.53	$48,300	
1993	Denmars Dream	3	Alex Solis	Ian P. D. Jory	Dennis Deering, Terry Kirchenwitz, Marvin Malmuth	6 F	1:08.76	$47,475	
1992	Race not held								
1991	Prince Wild	3	Gary Stevens	Jack Van Berg	John & JoAnn Bozak	6 F	1:08.22	$46,875	
1990	Apollo	3	Chris McCarron	Gary F. Jones	Diane & Harold Keith & Leon Rasmussen	6 F	1:08.60	$46,050	
1989	Tarascon	3	Chris McCarron	David Hofmans	Ridder Thoroughbred Stable	6 F	1:08.60	$49,200	
1988	Raise a Stanza	3	Eddie Delahoussaye	Jay Robbins	Jack Kent Cooke	6 F	1:09.80	$48,200	
1987	Drouilly's Boy	3	Frank Olivares	William Spawr	Jim Franklin, William Spawr, John Sullivan	6 F	1:09.80	$46,800	
1986	Broadway Pointe	3	Eddie Delahoussaye	Jude T. Feld	Michael House	6 F	1:10.40	$38,700	
1985 †	Dancing Pirate	3	Eddie Delahoussaye	Morris Soriano	Berman, Shanberg, Soriano	6 F	1:10.60	$36,100	
1985 †	Teddy Naturally	3	Jorge Estrada	Ted West Sr.	A. Hubert Webb	6 F	1:08.80	$37,150	
1984	Precisionist	3	Chris McCarron	Ross Fenstermaker	Fred W. Hooper	6 F	1:09.00	$37,150	
1983	Pillager	3	Laffit Pincay Jr.	Joseph Manzi	Robert E. Hibbert	6 F	1:09.80	$38,250	
1982	Unpredictable	3	Eddie Delahoussaye	David LaCroix	Joseph W. LaCroix	6 F	1:10.20	$38,550	
1981	Motivity	3	Ron Hansen	Ross Fenstermaker	Fred W. Hooper	6 F	1:09.80	$32,000	
1980	Rex Imperator	3	Bill Shoemaker	Bud Delp	James A. & Nancy L. Bayard	6 F	1:09.40	$34,150	
1979	Crest of the Wave	3	William Rodriguez	Ross Fenstermaker	Fred W. Hooper	6 F	1:09.00	$32,400	
1978	O Big Al	3	Darrel McHargue	Joseph Manzi	Mildred or Al Ross	6 F	1:09.40	$26,000	
1977	Smasher	3	Bill Shoemaker	Jay Robbins	Robbins & Rogers	6 F	1:10.20	$26,450	
1976	Sure Fire	3	Carlos E. Lopez Sr.	Bert C. Littrell	Bert C. Littrell	6 F	1:09.60	$19,800	
1975	Mr. Paul	3	Laffit Pincay Jr.	Paul Falkenstein	Harold Elkind & Paul Falkenstein	6 F	1:11.00	$22,050	
1974	Money Lender	3	Dennis Tierney	Johnny Longden	Hazel Longden	6 F	1:11.40	$20,600	
1973	Linda's Chief	3	Laffit Pincay Jr.	Robert J. Frankel	Neil Hellman	6 F	1:11.40	$20,450	
1972	MacArthur Park	3	Laffit Pincay Jr.	Tommy Doyle	Mark Three Stable	6 F	1:08.40	$19,500	
1971	Tower East	3	Bill Shoemaker	Wayne B. Stucki	Robert J. Sabinske & Leslie A. Stemmons Jr.	6 F	1:13.20	$17,900	
1970	Race not held								
1969	Mr. Joe F.	3	Merlin Volzke	Carl A. Roles	Mrs. Joseph T. Forno	6 F	1:09.80	$13,700	
1968	Don B.	3	Donald Pierce	Lester Holt	Donald B. Wood	6 F	1:09.40	$15,000	
1967	Disciplinarian	3	Donald Pierce	Edward A. Neloy	Wheatley Stable	6 F	1:10.80	$13,700	
1966	Port Wine	3	Bill Shoemaker	Robert L. Wheeler	Cornelius Vanderbilt Whitney	6 F	1:10.00	$15,800	
1965	Hempen	3	Ismael Valenzuela	Steve Ippolito	Jacnot Stable (Jack R. Hogan)	6 F	1:09.40	$15,150	
1964	Real Good Deal	3	Bill Shoemaker	T. R. Scott	Elwood B. & Elizabeth E. Johnston	6 F	1:10.20	$14,200	
1963	Royal Grounded	3	Ismael Valenzuela	Cecil C. Jolly	Royal Oaks Farm & J K Stable	6.5 F	1:17.20	$10,800	
1962	Admiral's Voyage	3	Braulio Baeza	Julius E. Tinsley	Fred W. Hooper	6.5 F	1:16.40	$11,150	
1961	Captain Fair	3	Donald Pierce	Charles A. Comiskey	Robert S. LeSage	6.5 F	1:16.20	$10,750	
1960	New Policy	3	Bill Shoemaker	John H. Adams	Ralph Lowe	6.5 F	1:15.80	$13,100	
1959	Race not held								
1958	Aliwar	3	Ralph Neves	Noble Threewitt	Warner Ranch	6.5 F	1:16.40	$10,300	
1957	Buford	3	Ismael Valenzuela	Willie Alvarado	Earl O. Stice & Sons	6 F	1:09.60	$9,900	
1956	Count Chic	3	William Boland	Lloyd A. Lawson	Dino A. Lozzi	7 F	1:23.60	$11,700	

- † In 1985 the race was run in January and again in December.
