= Turkoman (horse) =

American-bred Thoroughbred racehorse

- Sire: Alydar
- Grandsire: Raise a Native
- Dam: Taba
- Damsire: Table Play
- Sex: Stallion
- Foaled: April 11, 1982; Waterford Millford Farm; Midway, Kentucky
- Died: December 21, 2016; EA Ranches; Ramona, California
- Country: United States
- Colour: Dark Brown
- Breeder: Corbin Robertson
- Owner: Saron Stable (Corbin Robertson)
- Trainer: Gary F. Jones
- Record: 22: 8-8-3
- Earnings: $2,146,924

Major wins
- Affirmed Handicap (1985); Widener Handicap (1986); Marlboro Cup Invitational Handicap (1986); Oaklawn Handicap (1986); Tallahassee Handicap (1986)

Awards
- U.S. Champion Older Male Horse (1986)
- Last updated on December 15, 2007

Turkoman (April 11, 1982 – December 21, 2016) was an American Thoroughbred racehorse and sire.

== Background ==
Owned and bred by Corbin Robertson, he was sired by 1989 United States Racing Hall of Fame inductee Alydar out of the Table Play mare, Taba, who was the Champion 2 year old Filly in Argentina.

Raced under Corbin Robertson's Saron Stable banner, Turkoman was trained by Gary Jones.

== Racing career ==
Turkoman was lightly raced at two, winning only a six-furlong maiden race at Hollywood Park.

At three, he won the Grade III Affirmed Handicap, placed second in the Grade I Travers Stakes, was second in the Grade I Swaps Stakes, finished second in the California Derby, and was third in the Breeders' Cup Classic behind winner Proud Truth and Gate Dancer.

At four, he started the season with a win in the Tallahassee Handicap in 1:08 1/5 for six furlongs. He beat Preakness Stakes winner Gate Dancer in both the Widener Handicap, which he set a track record in 1:58 3/5, and the Oaklawn Handicap with Chris McCarron aloft. In perhaps his best race, Turkoman outdueled Precisionist down the stretch for a win in the Marlboro Cup Invitational Handicap. He then finished second to Crème Fraiche in the Jockey Club Gold Cup. In the Breeders Cup Classic with jockey Pat Day substitute riding for the injured Chris McCarron, coming from far back his late rally fell short of catching front-runner Skywalker though he once again finished ahead of Precisionist. These performances saw him clinch the 1986 U.S. Champion Older Male Horse.

== Retirement ==
Upon retirement in 1987, Turkoman was initially sent to Circle H Ranch in California and then relocated in 2004 to Mira Loma Thoroughbred Farm in Riverside County where he stood at stud until the farm closed in 2006. He is pensioned at E. A. Ranches in Santa Ysabel.

He was the sire of graded stakes race winners Turk Passer, Man From Wicklow, Peruvian three-year-old Champion Captain Garfio, Personal Merit, and Miss Turkana.

As a broodmare sire, he has sired Turko's Turn, dam of 2001 United States Horse of the Year Point Given, and Turkish Tryst, dam of Hard Spun, second in the 2007 Kentucky Derby. Turkoman is also the broodmare sire of Colonel John, a Grade I winner of the Santa Anita Derby

Turkoman lived out his days at E.A. Ranches in Ramona, California. A portion of his boarding fee was paid by Our Mims Retirement Haven in Paris Ky through a grant funded by his racing owners. He was euthanized in December 2016 due to chronic instability in his hindquarters and will be cremated and buried back in Kentucky next to his dam, Taba, and his half sister.
