= Gimme Da Lute =

American-bred Thoroughbred racehorse

- Sire: Midnight Lute
- Grandsire: Real Quiet
- Dam: Casino Gold
- Damsire: Proud Citizen
- Sex: Stallion
- Foaled: 2012
- Country: United States
- Colour: Bay
- Breeder: Karl Watson, Michael E. Pegram, Paul Weitman
- Owner: Karl Watson, Michael E. Pegram, Paul Weitman
- Trainer: Bob Baffert
- Record: 9 starts: 6-1-2
- Earnings: US$627,560

Major wins
- Echo Eddie Stakes (2015); Affirmed Stakes (2015); Los Alamitos Derby (2015); El Cajon Stakes (2015); Real Good Deal Stakes (2015)

Awards
- California Horse of the Year (2015)

Gimme Da Lute (March 13, 2012 – November 6, 2015) was an American Thoroughbred racehorse and graded stakes winner.

== Career ==
Gimme Da Lute won his first race in his second start at age three. After that he won the Echo Eddie Stakes then followed that with third-place finishes in the Chick Lang and Pat Day Mile Stakes. He got his first big stakes victory in the Affirmed Handicap after which he won the Los Alamitos Derby, the most important victory in his career. Gimme Da Lute only ran two more times after that with wins in the Real Good Deal Stakes for California-bred 3-year-olds, and the El Cajon Stakes.

== Death ==
After he won the El Cajon, Gimme Da Lute suffered a hind leg fracture while working out at Santa Anita Park. A week later he underwent surgery that at first seemed to be successful. However, the colt fractured his leg again coming out of surgery and had to be euthanized.

== Honors ==
In February 2016 Gimme Da Lute was posthumously voted the title of California Horse of the Year.
