= Nashoba's Key =

American-bred Thoroughbred racehorse

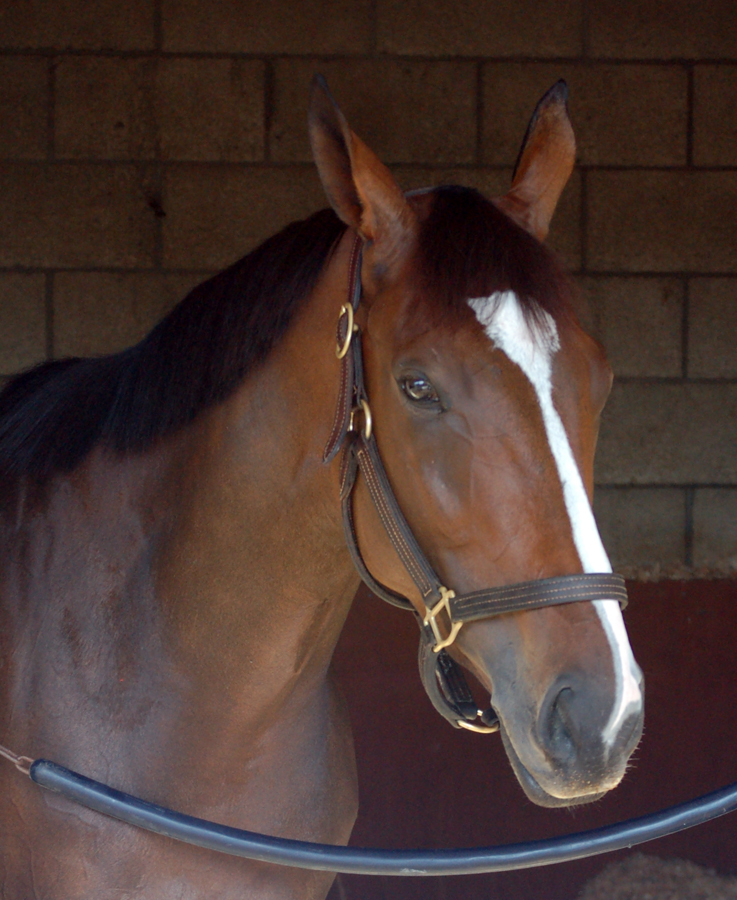
- Nashoba's Key in her stall at Del Mar
- Sire: Silver Hawk
- Grandsire: Roberto
- Dam: Nashoba
- Damsire: Caerleon
- Sex: Filly
- Foaled: 2003
- Country: United States
- Colour: Bay
- Breeder: Williamson Racing LLC
- Owner: Warren B. Williamson
- Trainer: Carla Gaines
- Record: 10:8-1-0
- Earnings: $1,252,090

Major wins
- Milady Breeders' Cup Handicap (2007); Vanity Handicap (2007); Clement L. Hirsch Handicap (2007); Yellow Ribbon Stakes (2007); Santa Margarita Invitational Handicap (2008)

Awards
- California Horse of the Year (2007)
- Last updated on September 28, 2008

Nashoba's Key (March 26, 2003 – May 28, 2008) was a bay filly thoroughbred race horse by Silver Hawk (Roberto) out of Nashoba (Caerleon) who went undefeated in her first seven starts in the Southern California racing circuit, before placing 4th in the 2007 Breeders' Cup Filly & Mare Turf.

Bred and owned by 79-year-old Warren B. Williamson and trained by Carla Gaines, Nashoba's Key went from an untested 4-year-old maiden to a Grade I winner in less than 6 months. With her first three starts on turf with jockey Garrett Gomez aboard, she earned her first big win in the June 3, 2007, Milady Breeders' Cup Handicap on Hollywood Park Racetrack's new synthetic Cushion Track. Seventeen-year-old jockey Joseph Talamo drove her to a surprise victory against Grade I winners Hystericalady and Balance in this race. A month later, on July 7, 2007, Talamo rallied Nashoba's Key to her first Grade I victory in the Vanity Handicap, again defeating Balance and Hystericalady on Hollywood's All Weather Track.

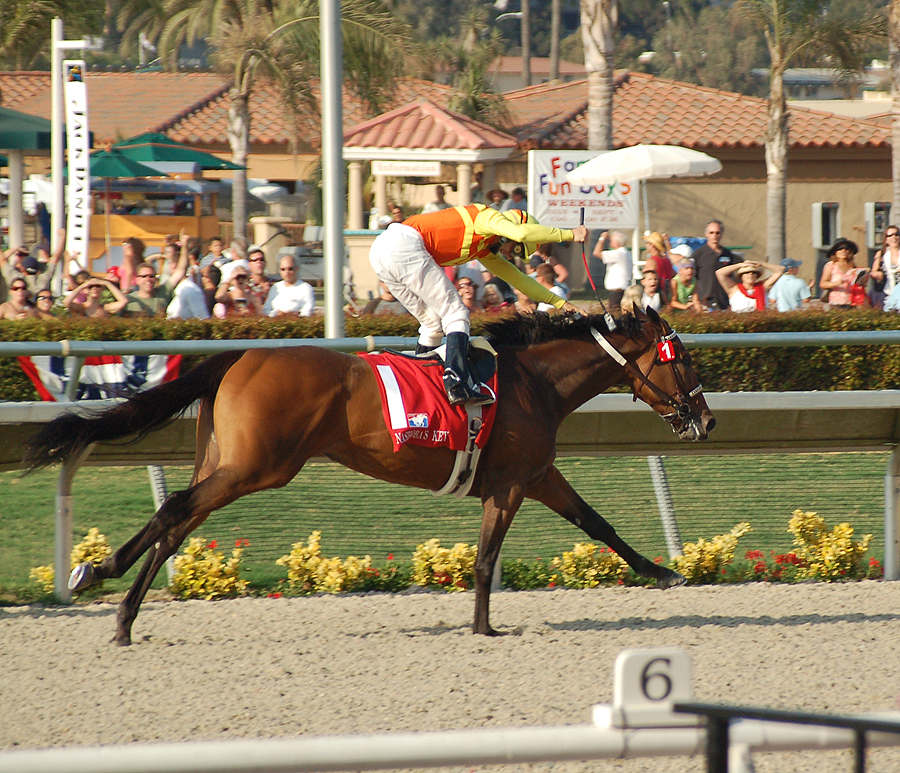
Nashoba's Key (with jockey Joseph Talamo) after crossing the finish line to take 1st place in the 2007 Clement L. Hirsch Handicap.

On August 5, 2007, the filly won the Grade II Clement L. Hirsch Handicap on Del Mar Racetrack's new Polytrack. Nashoba's Key was bumped at the start of the race and was then boxed in on the stretch, but she escaped and outkicked Balance for another win. Owner-breeder Warren B. Williamson commented on the race, "I don't know if you'd call it a conspiracy, but it looked like it. They tried everything to beat her and it didn't work. She was gone."

The 4-year-old returned to the turf for the GI Yellow Ribbon Stakes at Santa Anita Park's Oak Tree meet on Sept 29 for a win against the slimly favored Citronnade. Nashoba's Key stalked the pace-setting Citronnade until the top of the stretch, where the pair dueled and Nashoba's Key pulled ahead by 3/4 of a length.

Nashoba's Key (with jockey Joseph Talamo) along the rail for the Breeders' Cup Filly and Mare Turf.

On Oct. 27, 2007, Nashoba's Key ran in the prestigious Breeders' Cup Filly & Mare Turf at Monmouth Park and received her first defeat. After a good break, the filly was forced to take an inward position along the rail amid a traffic jam of other horses on the rain-soaked turf. Jockey Joseph Talamo said, "She was on the worst part of the turf the whole way around there. It was probably 6 inches deep along the rail." Nashoba's Key had gone off as the second favorite, but was unable to rally enough to catch the leaders along the stretch and finished 4th, two lengths behind the surprise winner Lahudood. Nonetheless, Nashoba's Key was awarded California Horse of the Year honors by the California Thoroughbred Breeders' Association for the 2007 season.

Nashoba's Key made her 2008 racing debut on January 26 in the Sunshine Millions Filly & Mare Turf at Santa Anita Park. Sent off as the 3-5 favorite with jockey Joseph Talamo aboard, the 5-year-old mare was unable to catch the leader, Quite a Bride, down the stretch and finished 1 3/4 lengths behind, placing 2nd. On March 9, 2008, Nashoba's Key won the GI Santa Margarita Invitational Handicap at Santa Anita by over four lengths under jockey Garrett Gomez, which pushed her earnings past the $1 million mark.

On May 28, 2008, Nashoba's Key was euthanized after breaking her left hock in her stall at Hollywood Park. The 5-year-old was expected to be one of the favorites for that fall's Breeders' Cup at Santa Anita. She was known for her feisty demeanor, and she apparently kicked the stall, shattering her left tibia. Visitors were often warned against getting too close to Nashoba's Key to avoid angering her. Trainer Carla Gaines issued a short statement: "In a freak accident at 5:30 a.m. this morning at Hollywood Park, Nashoba’s Key kicked the wall of her pen and broke her hind leg. She was euthanized shortly thereafter. She brought a lot of joy to everyone’s lives that were lucky enough to be associated with her and we will all miss her very much."
