= Snow Chief =

American-bred Thoroughbred racehorse

- Sire: Reflected Glory
- Grandsire: Jester
- Dam: Miss Snowflake
- Damsire: Snow Sporting
- Sex: Male
- Foaled: 1983
- Country: United States
- Colour: Black
- Breeder: Blue Diamond Ranch (Carl F. Grinstead)
- Owner: Carl Grinstead & Ben Rochelle
- Trainer: Melvin F. Stute
- Record: 24: 13-3-5
- Earnings: $3,383,210

Major wins
- Hollywood Futurity (1985); Norfolk Stakes (1985); California Breeders' Champion Stakes (1986); El Camino Real Derby (1986); Florida Derby (1986); Santa Anita Derby (1986); Jersey Derby (1986); Charles H. Strub Stakes (1987); Oaklawn Handicap (1987) American Classic Race wins: Preakness Stakes (1986)

Awards
- California Horse of the Year (1985, 1986, 1987); American Champion 3-Year-Old Male Horse (1986)
- Last updated on September 27, 2008

Snow Chief (March 17, 1983 in California – May 18, 2010) was an American Champion Thoroughbred racehorse.

== Background ==
Snow Chief was bred by Carl Grinstead. In 1984, retired vaudevillian and successful real estate investor Ben Rochelle bought a fifty percent interest in Grinstead's Blue Diamond Ranch, thus becoming a half owner of the yearling. Snow Chief was one of several winners produced by the mare Miss Snowflake: the others included Mujaazif, who won the Royal Lodge Stakes in 1990.

== Racing career ==
=== 1985: two-year-old season ===
Conditioned by veteran California trainer Mel Stute, Snow Chief made nine starts at age two, winning five, including the Norfolk Stakes and the Hollywood Futurity. His 1985 performances earned him California Horse of the Year honors, but Tasso, the 1985 Breeders' Cup Juvenile winner, was voted the Eclipse Award for American Champion Two-Year-Old Colt.

=== 1986: three-year-old season ===
As a three-year-old, Snow Chief made a further nine starts. In California, he won two stakes races, then was sent to Florida, where he won the important Florida Derby. Back in California, he established himself as the solid Kentucky Derby favorite with a win in that state's most important race for three-year-olds, the Santa Anita Derby.

Snow Chief was sent off at even money as the bettors' choice in the Kentucky Derby but in a sixteen-horse field, he finished eleventh to winner Ferdinand. However, Snow Chief returned to form in the Preakness Stakes, defeating runner-up Ferdinand by four lengths.

His handlers chose not to run him in the 1½ mile Belmont Stakes. Instead they later sent him to Garden State Park, where he won the Jersey Derby. For his performances in 1986, Snow Chief was named California Horse of the Year for the second straight year and was voted American Champion Three-Year-Old Male Horse.

=== 1987: four-year-old season ===
Snow Chief returned to racing as a four-year-old in 1987. From six starts, he won two and earned three seconds. His wins came in the Charles H. Strub Stakes at Santa Anita Racetrack in California and the Oaklawn Handicap at Oaklawn Park Race Track in Arkansas. He was voted California Horse of the Year for the third time.

== Stud career ==
He was retired to stud duty, producing offspring that have met with modest success. He stood at Diane Rochelle's Eagle Oak Ranch in Paso Robles, California, and died due to an apparent heart attack on the morning of May 18, 2010.

== Pedigree ==
Pedigree of Snow Chief
Sire Reflected Glory drk.br. 1964	Jester bay 1955	Tom Fool	Menow
Sire Reflected Glory drk.br. 1964	Jester bay 1955	Tom Fool	Gaga
Sire Reflected Glory drk.br. 1964	Jester bay 1955	Golden Apple	Eight Thirty
Sire Reflected Glory drk.br. 1964	Jester bay 1955	Golden Apple	Thorn Apple
Sire Reflected Glory drk.br. 1964	Lysistrata gray 1954	Palestinian	Sun Again
Sire Reflected Glory drk.br. 1964	Lysistrata gray 1954	Palestinian	Dolly Whisk
Sire Reflected Glory drk.br. 1964	Lysistrata gray 1954	Jaconda	Belfonds
Sire Reflected Glory drk.br. 1964	Lysistrata gray 1954	Jaconda	Jacola
Dam Miss Snowflake bay 1978	Snow Sporting drk.br. 1966	Snow Cat	Arctic Prince
Dam Miss Snowflake bay 1978	Snow Sporting drk.br. 1966	Snow Cat	Calash
Dam Miss Snowflake bay 1978	Snow Sporting drk.br. 1966	Extatica	Claro
Dam Miss Snowflake bay 1978	Snow Sporting drk.br. 1966	Extatica	Extasiada
Dam Miss Snowflake bay 1978	Bold Jewel ch. 1973	Any Time Now	Nigromante
Dam Miss Snowflake bay 1978	Bold Jewel ch. 1973	Any Time Now	Time to Khal
Dam Miss Snowflake bay 1978	Bold Jewel ch. 1973	Bold Contessa	Bold Combatant
Dam Miss Snowflake bay 1978	Bold Jewel ch. 1973	Bold Contessa	Fleet Contessa
