= Del Mar Dennis =

American-bred Thoroughbred racehorse

- Sire: Dixieland Band
- Grandsire: Northern Dancer
- Dam: Party Bonnet
- Damsire: The Axe II
- Sex: Gelding
- Foaled: 1990
- Country: United States
- Colour: Chestnut
- Breeder: Woodcrest
- Owner: Trudy McCaffery & John Toffan
- Trainer: J. Paco Gonzalez
- Jockey: Sal Gonzalez jr.
- Record: 26: 10-1-4
- Earnings: US$1,023,612

Major wins
- Mervyn Leroy Handicap (1994); San Bernardino Handicap (1994, 1995, 1996); San Pasqual Handicap (1995)
- Last updated on January 1, 2010

Del Mar Dennis (foaled 1990 in Kentucky) is an American millionaire Thoroughbred racehorse who raced from a base at Santa Anita Park in Arcadia, California where he won three straight editions of the San Bernardino Handicap between 1994 and 1996.

Sired by Dixieland Band, a son of Northern Dancer, Del Mar Dennis was out of the mare, Party Bonnet. He was purchased as a yearling for US$50,000 at the Keeneland Sales by the California racing/breeding partnership of Canadians Trudy McCaffery and John Toffan. Physical problems prevented the colt from racing at age two in 1992 and into the first part of 1993 and the decision was made to geld him.

In 1994, the then four-year-old won the Mervyn Leroy Handicap at Hollywood Park Racetrack and the first of his three consecutive runnings of the San Bernardino Handicap. As well, he earned a third-place result in that year's Hollywood Gold Cup. In 1995, Del Mar Dennis won the San Pasqual Handicap and his 1996 win of the San Bernardino Handicap marked the first time in the 59-year history of the Santa Anta racetrack that a horse had won a race three years in a row.
