= Sky Jack =

American-bred Thoroughbred racehorse

- Sire: Jaklin Klugman
- Grandsire: Orbit Ruler
- Dam: Sky Captive
- Damsire: Skywalker
- Sex: Gelding
- Foaled: 1996
- Country: United States
- Colour: Roan
- Breeder: Ren-Mar Thoroughbreds, Inc.
- Owner: Rene & Margie Lambert
- Trainer: Douglas F. O'Neill
- Record: 18: 10-2-2
- Earnings: $1,115,127

Major wins
- California Cup Classic (2000); Native Diver Handicap (2000); Mervyn Leroy Handicap (2002); Hollywood Gold Cup (2002); Longacres Mile Handicap (2003)
- Last updated on October 1, 2007

Sky Jack (April 18, 1996 – June 30, 2016) was an American thoroughbred racehorse.

== Background ==
Bred and raced by Rene and Margie Lambert, he was sired by Jaklin Klugman and out of the mare Sky Captive, a daughter of the 1986 Breeders' Cup Classic winner Skywalker.

== Racing career ==
After a successful season in 2000, Sky Jack incurred a knee injury that required multiple surgeries. In addition, he suffered from bouts of colic, all of which kept him out of racing until September 2002. Having recovered from life-threatening illnesses, the gelding enjoyed his most successful season, winning the Grade II Mervyn Leroy Handicap and the Grade I Hollywood Gold Cup. In winning the 2003 Longacres Mile Handicap, Sky Jack set the record for both the fastest time and widest margin of victory.

== Retirement ==
Due to a recurring knee problem, Sky Jack was retired in November 2003 to his owners' farm near Temecula, California. Suffering from melanoma, on June 30, 2016 Sky Jack was humanely euthanized.
