= Tank's Prospect =

American-bred Thoroughbred racehorse

- Sire: Mr. Prospector
- Grandsire: Raise a Native
- Dam: Midnight Pumpkin
- Damsire: Pretense
- Sex: Stallion
- Foaled: 1982
- Country: United States
- Colour: Bay
- Breeder: Edward A. Seltzer
- Owner: Eugene V. Klein
- Trainer: D. Wayne Lukas
- Record: 14: 5-2-2
- Earnings: US$1,355,645

Major wins
- El Camino Real Derby (1985); Arkansas Derby (1985) American Classic Race wins: Preakness Stakes (1985)

Tank's Prospect (May 2, 1982 – March 2, 1995) was an American Thoroughbred racehorse best known for winning the second leg of the U.S. Triple Crown series, the Preakness Stakes.

== Background ==
Bred by Edward A. Seltzer, he was purchased for $625,000 at the 1983 Keeneland July Selected Yearling sale by trainer D. Wayne Lukas for his client, Eugene Klein. Klein named the horse after Paul "Tank" Younger, a former National Football League player and executive with Klein's San Diego Chargers football team.

== Racing career ==
At age two, Tank's Prospect won his first start, a six-furlong race at California's Santa Anita Park. While he did not win a major race that year, in the inaugural running of the Breeders' Cup Juvenile he finished second to winner Chief's Crown and ahead of third-place finisher Spend A Buck. Racing at age three in 1985, Tank's Prospect won the El Camino Real Derby and Arkansas Derby before running seventh in the Kentucky Derby. He then ran in the Preakness Stakes. Ridden by Pat Day, he caught the favorite, Chief's Crown, close to the finish and won by a head. The winning time of 1:53.4 was, at the time, considered a stakes record, although a commission in 2012 determined that Secretariat is the official record-holder at 1:53.0. In the third leg of the Triple Crown, Tank's Prospect broke down at the top of the stretch in the Belmont Stakes and did not finish the race. The injury ended his racing career.

== Stud record ==
Retired to stud duty, Tank's Prospect met with modest success. One of his best runners, Real Cash, won the American Derby and San Felipe Stakes.

Tank's Prospect was standing at Venture Farms in Aubrey, Texas, when he died on March 2, 1995, from a ruptured arterial blood vessel.

== Breeding ==
Pedigree of Tank's Prospect
Sire Mr. Prospector bay 1970	Raise a Native ch. 1961	Native Dancer	Polynesian
Sire Mr. Prospector bay 1970	Raise a Native ch. 1961	Native Dancer	Geisha
Sire Mr. Prospector bay 1970	Raise a Native ch. 1961	Raise You	Case Ace
Sire Mr. Prospector bay 1970	Raise a Native ch. 1961	Raise You	Lady Glory
Sire Mr. Prospector bay 1970	Gold Digger bay 1962	Nashua	Nasrullah
Sire Mr. Prospector bay 1970	Gold Digger bay 1962	Nashua	Segula
Sire Mr. Prospector bay 1970	Gold Digger bay 1962	Sequence	Count Fleet
Sire Mr. Prospector bay 1970	Gold Digger bay 1962	Sequence	Miss Dogwood
Dam Midnight Pumpkin bay 1977	Pretense drk.brn. 1963	Endeavor	British Empire
Dam Midnight Pumpkin bay 1977	Pretense drk.brn. 1963	Endeavor	Himalaya
Dam Midnight Pumpkin bay 1977	Pretense drk.brn. 1963	Imitation	Hyperion
Dam Midnight Pumpkin bay 1977	Pretense drk.brn. 1963	Imitation	Flattery
Dam Midnight Pumpkin bay 1977	Me Next bay 1960	Rough'n Tumble	Free for All
Dam Midnight Pumpkin bay 1977	Me Next bay 1960	Rough'n Tumble	Roused
Dam Midnight Pumpkin bay 1977	Me Next bay 1960	Iltis	War Relic
Dam Midnight Pumpkin bay 1977	Me Next bay 1960	Iltis	We Hail
