= California Derby =

Horse race in Berkeley, California, US

- Class: Ungraded
- Location: Golden Gate Fields; Berkeley, California
- Inaugurated: 1876
- Race type: Thoroughbred - Flat racing
- Website: www.goldengatefields.com

Race information
- Distance: 1 1/16 Miles (8.5 Furlongs)
- Track: Synthetic, left-handed
- Qualification: Three-year-olds
- Weight: Assigned
- Purse: $100,000

The California Derby was a race for Thoroughbred horses held early in the year at Golden Gate Fields until the track's closure on June 9, 2024. An ungraded stakes, it was open to three-year-olds at a distance of one and one-sixteenth miles on a Tapeta surface. The Derby last offered a purse of $100,000.

In a March 29, 1898 column, the Daily Racing Form wrote that the California Derby was one of the most important races in California and the most important for three-year-old horse.

Northern California's first major test for horses hoping to run for the Triple Crown, the California Derby was also the main local prep race for the $200,000 El Camino Real Derby also run at Golden Gate.

The California Derby had been run since 1873. At that time it was set at twelve furlongs or a mile and a half and was won by Camilla Urso. Mollie McCarty won the 1876 edition and in 1909, African-American jockey James Lee won the race aboard High Private, yet Joe Madden, who ran second to High Private, won the 1909 Belmont Stakes. Royal Orbit, who ran third in the California Derby, won the 1959 Preakness Stakes. The 1996 winner, Pike Place Dancer won the Kentucky Oaks.

== Winners of the California Derby since 1991 ==
Year	Winner	Age	Jockey	Trainer	Owner	Time
2023	Prince Abu Dhabi	3	Alexander Chavez	Blaine D. Wright	Lance & Steve Kinross	1:44.91
2022	Il Bellator	3	Alejandro Gomez	Jose Bautista	Edward & Theresa DeNike	1:44.27
2021	Stalking Shadow	3	Evin Roman	Jonathan Wong	Tommy Town Thoroughbreds	1:45.22
2020	No Race	-	No Race	No Race	No Race	0:00.00
2019	Kingly	3	Mario Gutierrez	Bob Baffert	Clearview Stable LLC	1:42.73
2018	Choo Choo	3	Juan J. Hernandez	Jerry Hollendorfer	Calumet Farm	1:44.50
2017	So Conflated	3	Mario Gutierrez	Doug F. O'Neill	Reddam Racing	1:44.71
2016	Frank Conversation	3	Mario Gutierrez	Doug F. O'Neill	Reddam Racing	1:43.37
2015	Cross the Line	3	Juan J. Hernandez	Jerry Hollendorfer	Hollendorfer/Todaro, Live Your Dream Racing et al.	1:44.79
2014	Exit Stage Left	3	Russell Baze	Jerry Hollendorfer	Hollendorfer/Dedomenico	1:44.07
2013	Zeewat	3	Russell Baze	Jerry Hollendorfer	Hollendorfer/Todaro	1:46.50
2012	Russian Greek	3	Aaron Gryder	Jerry Hollendorfer	Olympia Star, Inc.	1:45.07
2011	Positive Response	3	Julien Couton	William E. Morey	Gevertz/Morey/ Newman/Pagano	1:44.56
2010	Ranger Heartley	3	Julio Garcia	John W. Sadler	David Alpert/Herb Alpert	1:45.40
2009	Chocolate Candy	3	Russell Baze	Jerry Hollendorfer	Craig Family Trust	1:43.98
2008	Yankee Bravo	3	Alex Solis	Patrick Gallagher	Harlequin Ranches et al.	1:44.57
2007	Bwana Bull	3	David Lopez	Jerry Hollendorfer	Mark De Domenico et al.	1:44.70
2006	Cause to Believe	3	Russell Baze	Jerry Hollendorfer	Peter Redekop/Peter Abruzzo	1:41.07
2005	No Race	-	No Race	No Race	No Race	0:00.00
2004	Trieste's Honor	3	Russell Baze	Mike Puype	Cobra Farm	1:47.95
2003	Mr. Technique	3	Roberto M. Gonzalez	Jeffrey L. Bonde	James Vreeland	1:47.65
2002	Tracemark	3	Jason Lumpkins	Craig Dollase	Edward T. McGrath	1:47.93
2001	Takin It Deep	3	Jose Arriaga	Gil Matos	M. A. Douzas	1:49.25
2000	Bet On Red	3	Ron Warren Jr.	Brent Sumja	James Egide/Barry Thiriot	1:48.00
1999	Red Sky's	3	Russell Baze	Jeffrey L. Bonde	Barton D. Heller	1:47.16
1998	Prime Meridian	3	Rafael Meza	Brent Surnja	Kenwood Racing	1:48.64
1997	I'm a Jewel	3	Agapito Delgadillo	William Delia	Will.Delia & E.Garrison	1:52.55
1996	Pike Place Dancer	3	Corey Nakatani	Jerry Hollendorfer	Hollendorfer & Todaro	1.50.33
1995	Fine n' Majestic	3	Eddie Delahoussaye	Bill Shoemaker	Bienstock & Papiano	1:42.49
1994	Screaming Don	3	Adalberto Lopez	Lanny Sharp	Heim, Said & Sharp	1:48.31
1993	Denmars Dream	3	Alex Solis	Ian Jory	Terry Dennis Deering	1:49.96
1992	Treekster	3	Gary Boulanger	Vladimir Cerin	Mary Ann Racing Stable	1:48.19
1991	Green Alligator	3	Corey Nakatani	Murray Johnson	Anderson Fowler	1:47.90

== Winners before 1991 ==
- 1990 - Stalwart Charger
- 1989 - Endow
- 1988 - All Thee Power
- 1987 - Simply Majestic
- 1986 - Vernon Castle
- 1985 - Hajjis Treasure
- 1984 - Distant Ryder
- 1983 - Paris Prince
- 1982 - Rockwall
- 1981 - Always a Cinch
- 1980 - Jaklin Klugman
- 1979 - Beau's Eagle
- 1978 - Noble Bronze
- 1977 - Cuzwuzwrong
- 1976 - Telly's Pop
- 1975 - Diabolo
- 1974 - Agitate
- 1973 - Linda's Chief
- 1972 - Quack
- 1971 - Unconscious
- 1970 - George Lewis
- 1969 - Jay Ray
- 1968 - Proper Proof
- 1967 - Reason to Hail
- 1966 - Tragniew
- 1965 - Perfect Sky
- 1964 - Real Good Deal
- 1963 - On My Honor
- 1962 - Doc Jocoy
- 1961 - Mr. Consistency
- 1960 - Noble Noor
- 1959 - Finnegan
- 1958 - Nice Guy
- 1957 - NOT RUN
- 1956 - No Regrets
- 1955 - Trackmaster
- 1954 - Miz Clementine
- 1949 - 1953 - NOT RUN
- 1948 - May Reward
- 1947 - NOT RUN
- 1946 - War Spun
- 1945 - NOT RUN
- 1944 - Jade Boy
- 1942 & 1943 - NOT RUN
- 1941 - Pirate
- 1939 & 1940 - NOT RUN
- 1938 - Grim Reaper
- 1937 - Rockwood
- 1936 - Lloyd Pan
- 1935 - Toro Flight
- 1923 - Victoire
- 1910 - Turrets
- 1909 - High Private
- 1908 - Meelick
- 1907 - Temaceo
- 1906 - Good Luck
- 1905 - Dr Leggo
- 1904 - Bombardier
- 1903 - Claude
- 1902 - Sombrero
- 1901 - Joe Frey
- 1900 - NOT RUN
- 1899 - Corsini
- 1898 - Traverser
- 1897 - Scarborough
- 1890 - Muta
- 1889 - Hotspur
- 1888 - Peel
- 1887 - Jim Duffy
- 1886 - May Blossom
- 1885 - Ned Cook
- 1884 - Phillip S
- 1883 - Augusta E
- 1882 - Duke of Monday
- 1881 - Jim Douglas
- 1880 - Sally Black
- 1879 - Sister Anne
- 1878 - Mark L
- 1877 - Lena Dunbar
- 1876 - Mollie McCarty
- 1875 - Bradley
- 1874 - NOT RUN
- 1873 - Camilla Urso
