= Earl Scheib =

Automotive paint and repair shop chain

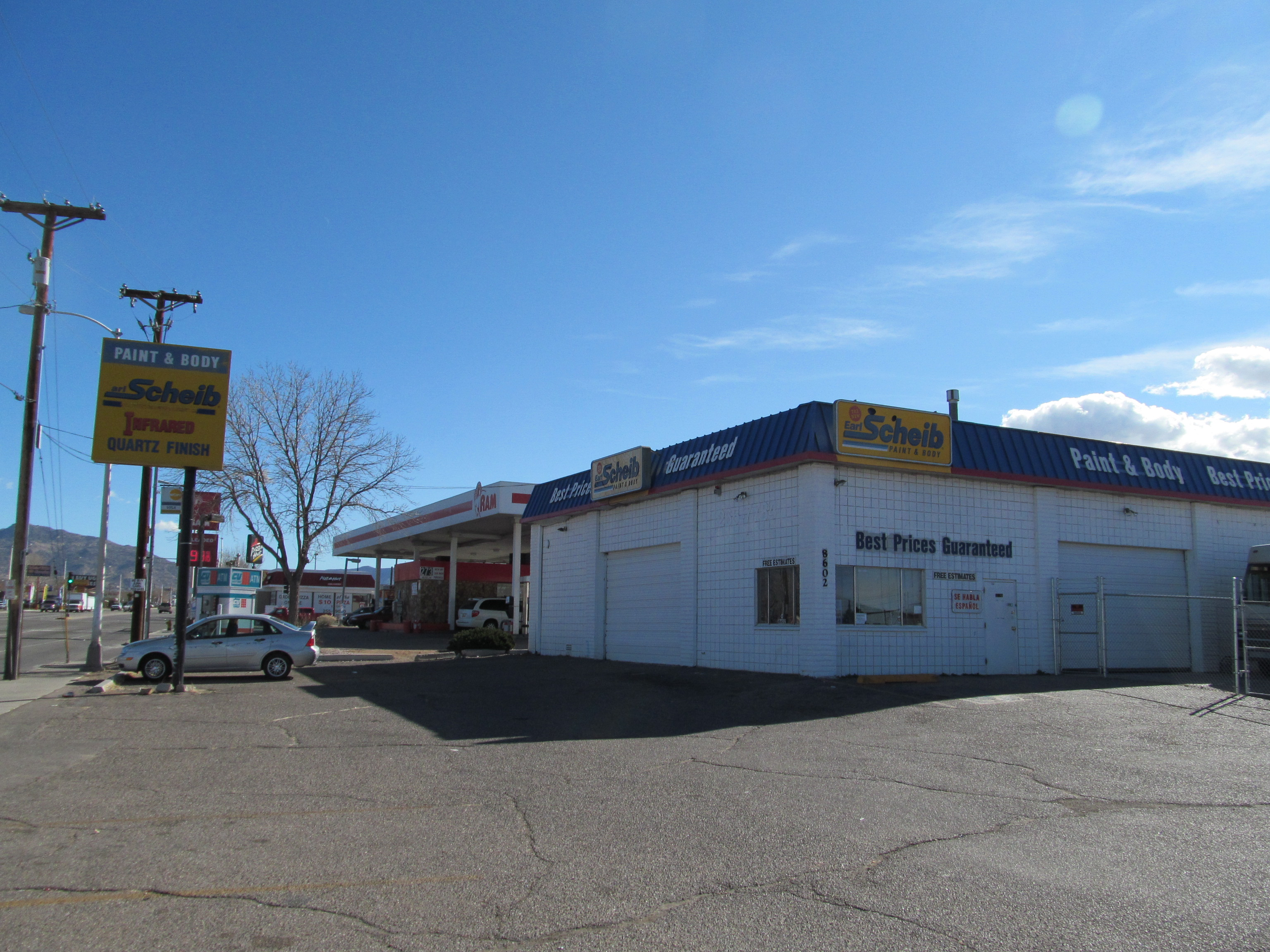
- Earl Scheib shop on Central Avenue in Albuquerque, New Mexico
- Industry: Automotive painting, automotive repair
- Founded: 1937 in Los Angeles, California, United States
- Founder: Earl Scheib
- Defunct: July 16, 2010
- Headquarters: Los Angeles, California, United States
- Key people: Earl Scheib

Earl Scheib was a company that specialized in low-cost repainting and collision repair of automobiles, with locations in 23 states in the United States.

== Company history ==
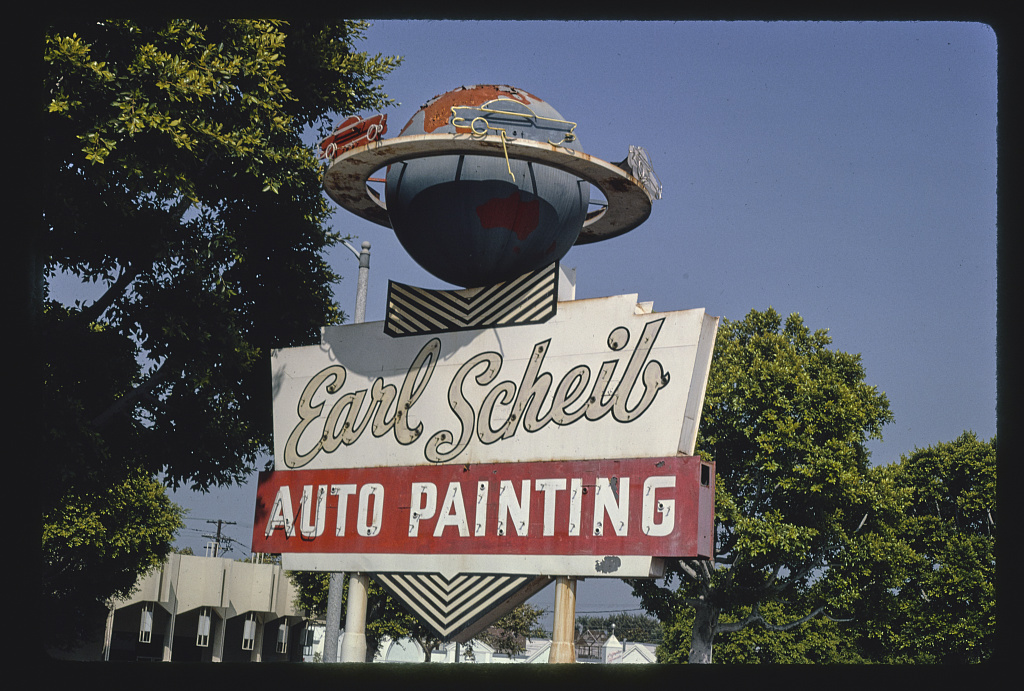
Earl Scheib Auto Painting sign, Olympic Boulevard, Beverly Hills, California, 1991

Founded by Earl Scheib (February 28, 1908 – February 29, 1992) in Los Angeles in 1937, the company grew quickly following World War II and by 1975 had branches in Germany and England, all company-owned, with Scheib manufacturing his own paint through a wholly owned subsidiary.

Born in San Francisco on February 28, 1908, Scheib moved to Southern California with his family when he was 10. A graduate of Los Angeles High School, Scheib never went to college. Instead, he got a job as a gas station attendant changing oil and tires for General Petroleum Co. in the late 1920s. Not long after, he went into business with his own gas station on the corner of Whitworth and Fairfax. His neighbors soon began asking if he knew anyone who could paint their cars. So, each night, after closing time, Scheib would paint cars in the station's lube garage.

It didn't take long for word of Scheib's painting service to spread, and soon there was more paint business than the station could handle. As a result, he sold his station, rented a "shack" on the corner of Pico and La Brea in Los Angeles, and in 1937 opened the first Earl Scheib Paint and Body. His philosophy was, "Work hard, be on time, and don't worry about how much you make." It was a belief that underscored the way he ran his business.

Scheib's paint-coating systems were used by its company-owned paint and collision repair shops. The paint also was sold to original equipment manufacturers and architectural construction firms.

== Advertising ==
Scheib began to expand nationally in the 1950s, and to raise awareness of his auto painting shops he turned to advertising. Earl Scheib marketed his shops through low-budget television commercials. Appearing on late-night television programs, Scheib soon became a national icon and celebrity, and his oft-heard sales pitch, "I'm Earl Scheib, and I'll paint any car, any color for $29.95. No ups, no extras," became an instantly recognizable phrase, with $29.95 the nationally advertised price even into the late 1960s. With inflation, this increased to $39.95-$59.95 by 1974 and $99.95 in the 1980s. Scheib, credited as being the first spokesperson for his own company, handled all advertising and developed and wrote his own television commercials. Scheib believed viewers would find his ads more convincing and genuine if he spoke directly to the viewers about the company's offerings.

Earl Scheib also handled media buys, placing his television and radio ads carefully. As son Donald explained in a company statement: 'He'd personally call the station manager and tell him to interrupt a sponsored show at a pivotal moment and run his ad. ... So you'd be watching a show, the villain's sneaking up behind the hero with a knife, and just when he's about to plunge the knife into the hero's back ... Earl comes on the screen pitching his service.' Scheib's commercials were seen and heard on television and radio stations in more than 100 cities, and he continued to film spots until his death in 1992. Despite his fame and television ad ubiquity, son Donald claimed that Scheib was not fond of appearing in commercials. 'In truth,' Donald Scheib said in a company statement, 'he hated doing those television spots. ... He didn't like being in front of the camera, you'd have to drag him feet-first into that studio, screaming.' Earl Scheib received many mentions on the Johnny Carson show in the '70s and '80s. These happened occasionally during skits as part of a punchline or in support of a set up. One example is that Earl Scheib would paint the smog in LA blue for 89.99. The context was the 1984 Olympics were starting, with the premise being the participants and fans wouldn't know there was smog there.

== Restructuring ==
In 1999, the company began closing branches and selling company-owned properties to show a profit to shareholders. The organization reduced the number of its shops as a result of this practice, with most of its remaining centers in the western states, where rust and corrosion are less likely to be a problem.

On February 18, 2009, Earl Scheib and Kelly Capital LLC, a private equity firm, announced the signing of the merger agreement. Kelly Capital LLC acquired the company in the second quarter of 2009 following shareholder approval of a merger agreement.

Beginning in July 2010, the company closed certain locations and franchised off the remaining locations to shop managers, giving them the opportunity to become small business owners. Specifically, the company offered them the rights to purchase all the equipment and fixtures in their shops and to use the Earl Scheib name for their own business. Many managers took advantage and agreed to the terms, resulting in today's independent Earl Scheib paint centers. These modern Earl Scheib centers now offer paint jobs and most of today's Scheib shops also offer custom painting, collision repair, and pinstriping.
