= El Camino Real Derby =

- Class: Listed
- Location: Golden Gate Fields; Berkeley, California
- Inaugurated: 1982
- Race type: Thoroughbred – Flat racing
- Website: www.goldengatefields.com

Race information
- Distance: 1 1/8 Miles (9 Furlongs)
- Track: Synthetic, left-handed
- Qualification: Three-year-olds
- Weight: Assigned
- Purse: $100,000

The El Camino Real Derby is a Listed American Thoroughbred horse race held in February at Golden Gate Fields in Albany, California. The race is open to three-year-olds willing to race one and one-eighth miles (9 furlongs) on Tapeta, a synthetic racing surface.

Northern California's premier Kentucky Derby prep, the El Camino Real Derby was first run in 1982. It was hosted by Bay Meadows racetrack until its closing in August 2008.

Originally a Grade III race, the event was downgraded in 2018 to listed status. It was part of the Road to the Kentucky Derby, but no longer so for the 2024 Kentucky Derby.

== Records ==
Stakes Record:

- 1:39.40 – Ruhlmann (1988)

Most wins by a jockey:

- 9 – Russell Baze (1984, 1998, 2005, 2006, 2007, 2009, 2010, 2011, 2014)

Most wins by a trainer:

- 6 – Jerry Hollendorfer (1998, 2002, 2006, 2007, 2009, 2014)

Most wins by an owner:

- 2 – Jenny Craig (2002, 2009)

== Winners of the El Camino Real Derby since 1982 ==
Year	Winner	Jockey	Trainer	Owner	Dist. (Miles)	Time	Grade
2024	Endlessly	Umperto Rispoli	Michael W. McCarthy	Amerman Racing LLC	1-1/8	1:50.68	Listed
2023	Chase the Chaos	Armando Ayuso	Ed Moger Jr.	Bill Dory & Adam Ference	1-1/8	1:51.68	Listed
2022	Blackadder	Edwin Maldonado	Bob Baffert	SF Racing LLC, Starlight Racing, & Madaket Stables	1-1/8	1:50.34	Listed
2021	Rombauer	Kyle Frey	Michael W. McCarthy	John & Diane Fradkin	1-1/8	1:51.64	Listed
2020	Azul Coast	Rafael Bejarano	Bob Baffert	Michael E. Pegram	1-1/8	1:51.58	Listed
2019	Anothertwistafate	Juan J. Hernandez	Blaine Wright	Peter Redekop	1-1/8	1:50.38	Listed
2018	Paved †	Drayden Van Dyke	Michael W. McCarthy	Ciaglia Racing & Eclipse Thoroughbred	1-1/8	1:50.04	Listed
2017	Zakaroff	Kyle Frey	Stephen Specht	Antone Melaxas	1-1/8	1:51.34	III
2016	Frank Conversation	Mario Gutierrez	Doug F. O'Neill	Reddam Racing	1-1/8	1:50.64	III
2015	Metaboss	Alex O. Solis	Jeffrey L. Bonde	M. J. Arndt, Milan McFetridge, Daniel Preiss, Mersad Metanovic, Azcarate & MRS Stables	1-1/8	1:49.92	III
2014	Tamarando	Russell Baze	Jerry Hollendorfer	Mr. & Mrs. Larry Williams	1-1/8	1:51.23	III
2013	Dice Flavor	Jose Valdivia Jr.	Patrick Gallagher	Oda Racing Stables and US Equine	1-1/8	1:51.45	III
2012	Daddy Nose Best	Julien Leparoux	Steven M. Asmussen	Bob & Cathy Zollars	1-1/8	1:50.46	III
2011	Silver Medallion	Russell Baze	Steven M. Asmussen	Michael J. Ryan	1-1/8	1:50.45	III
2010	Connemara	Russell Baze	Todd A. Pletcher	Michael Tabor	1-1/8	1:51.26	III
2009	Chocolate Candy	Russell Baze	Jerry Hollendorfer	Sidney Craig & Jenny Craig	1-1/8	1:50.54	III
2008	Autism Awareness	Luis Contreras	Genaro Vallejo	Johnny Taboada	1-1/16	1:43.17	III
2007	Bwana Bull	Russell Baze	Jerry Hollendorfer	Mark DeDomenico et al.	1-1/16	1:43.22	III
2006	Cause to Believe	Russell Baze	Jerry Hollendorfer	Peter Redekop/Peter Abruzzo	1-1/16	1:41.81	III
2005	Uncle Denny	Russell Baze	Rafael Becerra	Stanley E. Fulton	1-1/16	1:42.22	III
2004	Kilgowan	Chance Rollins	Lonnie Arterburn	Terrence & Noreen O'Neill	1-1/16	1:43.87	III
2003	Ocean Terrace	Mike E. Smith	Robert Hess Jr.	David Shimmon	1-1/16	1:42.26	III
2002	Yougottawanna	Jason Lumpkins	Jerry Hollendorfer	S Craig, Jenny Craig & Ted Aroney	1-1/16	1:43.48	III
2001	Hoovergetthekeys	Ron Warren	Brian Koriner	Carl Odegaard	1-1/16	1:40.85	III
2000	Remember Sheikh	Frank Alvarado	Lonnie Arterburn	J. Peppard / S. Smith	1-1/16	1:43.47	III
1999	Cliquot	David R. Flores	John Shirreffs	505 Farms	1-1/16	1:43.29	III
1998	Event of the Year	Russell Baze	Jerry Hollendorfer	Golden Eagle Farm	1-1/16	1:40.27	III
1997	Pacificbounty	Kent Desormeaux	Walter Greenman	Grey, Harris et al.	1-1/16	1:41.85	III
1996	Cavonnier	Martin Pedroza	Bob Baffert	Walter Family Trust	1-1/16	1:43.40	III
1995	Jumron	Goncalino Almeida	Gary Lewis	Charles Dunn	1-1/16	1:43.73	III
1994	Tabasco Cat	Pat Day	D. Wayne Lukas	Overbrook Farm/D. Reynolds	1-1/16	1:42.78	III
1993	El Atroz	Rafael Meza	Jose Silva	Cuadra Tyt	1-1/16	1:43.77	III
1992	Casual Lies	Alan Patterson	Shelley L. Riley	Shelley L. Riley	1-1/16	1:42.00	III
1991	Sea Cadet	Tom Chapman	Ron McAnally	V.H.W. Stables (lessee)	1-1/16	1:40.60	III
1990	Silver Ending	Gary Stevens	Ron McAnally	Costanza & McAnally	1-1/16	1:43.00	III
1989	Double Quick	Alex Solis	Melvin F. Stute	King III & McGaughey	1-1/16	1:43.60	III
1988	Ruhlmann	Pat Day	Robert J. Frankel	Ann & Jerry Moss	1-1/16	1:39.40	III
1987	Masterful Advocate	Laffit Pincay Jr.	Joseph Manzi	Belles (Lessee) & Leveton	1-1/16	1:42.40	III
1986	Snow Chief	Alex Solis	Melvin F. Stute	Grinstead & Rochelle	1-1/16	1:42.60	III
1985	Tank's Prospect	Jorge Velásquez	D. Wayne Lukas	Eugene V. Klein	1-1/16	1:41.00	III
1984	French Legionaire	Russell Baze	David Hofmans	David V. Ringler	1-1/16	1:42.40	
1983	Knightly Rapport	Fernando Toro	Joseph Manzi	Cotroneo/Leveton/Manzi	1-1/16	1:44.80	
1982	Cassaleria	Darrel McHargue	Ron McAnally	J. Brady et al.	1-1/16	1:42.80	

† filly

== See also ==
- Road to the Kentucky Derby
