= Goncalino Almeida =

Brazilian jockey (born 1956)

Personal information
- Born: January 28, 1956 (age 70) Rio de Janeiro, Brazil
- Occupation: Jockey

Horse racing career
- Sport: Horse racing
- Career wins: Ongoing

Major racing wins
- California Breeders' Champion Stakes (1995); El Camino Real Derby (1995); Explosive Bid Handicap (1995); Hollywood Turf Handicap (1995); Morvich Handicap (1995); Oak Tree Mile Stakes (1995); Monrovia Handicap (1996); Las Palmas Handicap (1997); San Rafael Stakes (1997); Triple Bend Handicap (1997); Palos Verdes Handicap (1998); San Gabriel Handicap (1998); Santa Margarita Handicap (1998); Inglewood Handicap (1999); San Marcos Stakes (1999); Del Mar Handicap (2002)

Significant horses
- Earl of Barking, Windsharp, Brave Act
- Updated on October 7, 2007

Gonçalino Feijó de Almeida (born 28 January 1956)) is a Brazilian jockey in Thoroughbred horse racing. A riding champion in his native Brazil, he has been racing in the United States since 1990. Based in California, he makes his home in Arcadia, California near the Santa Anita Park racetrack.

Almeida has won a number of important Graded stakes races in California and at the Fair Grounds Race Course in Louisiana. He has ridden in two Kentucky Derbys with his best result a fourth aboard Jumron in the 1995 running won by Thunder Gulch.

His son Goncalino Jr. is a natural science major and star athlete in cross country running at Loyola Marymount University.
