= Skywalker (horse) =

American Thoroughbred racehorse

- Sire: Relaunch
- Grandsire: In Reality
- Dam: Bold Captive
- Damsire: Boldnesian
- Sex: Stallion
- Foaled: 1982
- Country: United States
- Colour: Dark Bay
- Breeder: Oak Cliff Thoroughbreds Ltd.
- Owner: Oak Cliff Stable
- Trainer: Michael Whittingham
- Record: 20: 8-3-3
- Earnings: $2,226,750

Major wins
- Santa Anita Derby (1985); Longacres Mile (1986); Mervyn Leroy Handicap (1986); San Diego Handicap (1986) Breeders' Cup wins: Breeders' Cup Classic (1986)
- Last updated on October 10, 2007

Skywalker (March 4, 1982 – February 25, 2003) was an American Thoroughbred racehorse. He was best known for winning the 1986 Breeders' Cup Classic.

== Background ==
Bred in Kentucky by Thomas P. Tatham's Oak Cliff Thoroughbreds Ltd., who also bred Sunday Silence, Skywalker was foaled on March 4, 1982 and raised at Arthur B. Hancock III's Stone Farm. Sired by Relaunch and out of the mare Bold Captive, he was named by Tatham's son for Luke Skywalker, a lead character in the Star Wars motion pictures.

Skywalker was trained by Michael Whittingham and raced under the Oak Cliff Stable partnership led by Thomas Tatham.

== Racing career ==
Skywalker began racing in California in 1984 at age two, where he won one of his two starts and was off the board in the other. In his three-year-old campaign, he made five starts, winning twice. His most notable victory came under future U.S. Racing Hall of Fame jockey Laffit Pincay, Jr. when they won the most important West Coast race for three-year-olds, the Santa Anita Derby. He was then sent to Churchill Downs for the Kentucky Derby, where jockey Eddie Delahoussaye rode him to a sixth-place finish behind winner Spend A Buck.

In 1986, the four-year-old Skywalker had his best year in racing when he won the Longacres Mile, Mervyn Leroy Handicap, San Diego Handicap, and Breeders' Cup Classic run at California's Santa Anita Park. Ridden by Laffit Pincay, Jr., he defeated the heavy favorites Turkoman (Pat Day riding) and Precisionist (Gary Stevens on board), who finished second and third respectively, as well as the European star Triptych, who finished sixth.

Sent back to race at age five, Skywalker was second in the Arcadia Handicap and third in the Goodwood Handicap.

== Stud record ==
Retired to stud duty at Cardiff Stud Farm in Creston, California, he sired Bertrando, the 1993 Eclipse Award winner for American Champion Older Male Horse. Another notable son is Sky Terrace (2002 winnings: 16 starts: 4 - 1 - 2, $218,709 - 1st Derby Trial Stakes-G3 2nd Le-Comte S. 3rd Lafayette Stakes-G3, Northern Dancer Stakes). Skywalker was also the damsire of Sky Jack, a Hollywood Gold Cup winner. Skywalker was moved to his birthplace at Stone Farm in 1996 and died of a heart attack at age 21 on February 25, 2003. He is buried in the Stone Farm equine cemetery.

== Sire line tree ==
- Skywalker
  - Bertrando
    - Stormy Jack
    - Officer
      - Elite Squadron
      - Boys at Tosconova
    - Bilo
    - Unfurl the Flag
    - Karelian
    - Liberian Freighter
    - Sierra Sunset
    - Coach Bob
    - Tamerando
  - Al Skywalker
  - Sky Terrace

== Pedigree ==
Pedigree of Skywalker, dark bay/brown colt, 1982
Sire Relaunch	In Reality	Intentionally	Intent
Sire Relaunch	In Reality	Intentionally	My Recipe
Sire Relaunch	In Reality	My Dear Girl	Rough'n Tumble
Sire Relaunch	In Reality	My Dear Girl	Iltis
Sire Relaunch	Foggy Note	The Axe	Mahmoud
Sire Relaunch	Foggy Note	The Axe	Blackball
Sire Relaunch	Foggy Note	Silver Song	Royal Note
Sire Relaunch	Foggy Note	Silver Song	Beadah
Dam Bold Captive	Boldnesian	Bold Ruler	Nasrullah
Dam Bold Captive	Boldnesian	Bold Ruler	Miss Disco
Dam Bold Captive	Boldnesian	Alanesian	Polynesian*
Dam Bold Captive	Boldnesian	Alanesian	Alablue
Dam Bold Captive	Captive Audience	Native Dancer	Polynesian*
Dam Bold Captive	Captive Audience	Native Dancer	Geisha
Dam Bold Captive	Captive Audience	Home Port	Count Fleet
Dam Bold Captive	Captive Audience	Home Port	Home-Made (family: 2-d)

* Skywalker is inbred 4D × 4D to the stallion Polynesian, meaning that he appears twice fourth generation on the dam side of his pedigree.
