= Tasso (horse) =

American-bred Thoroughbred racehorse

- Sire: Fappiano
- Grandsire: Mr. Prospector
- Dam: Ecstacism
- Damsire: What A Pleasure
- Sex: Stallion
- Foaled: 1983
- Country: United States
- Colour: Bay
- Breeder: Gerald Robins & Timothy H. Sams
- Owner: Gerald Robins
- Trainer: Neil D. Drysdale
- Record: 23: 9-4-4
- Earnings: $1,207,884

Major wins
- Breeders' Futurity (1985); Del Mar Futurity (1985); El Cajon Stakes (1986) Breeders' Cup wins: Breeders' Cup Juvenile (1985)

Awards
- U.S. Champion 2-Yr-Old Colt (1985)
- Last updated on September 5, 2007

Tasso (foaled April 20, 1983, in Florida) is an American Thoroughbred racehorse who was named the Champion two-year-old of 1985 after winning the Breeders' Cup Juvenile.

== Background ==
Tasso was bred by Gerald Robbins and Timothy Sams of Waldemar Farm, subsequently renamed Stonehedge Farm South. Out of the mare Ecstacism, Tasso was from the first crop of Fappiano, a son of the very influential Champion sire Mr. Prospector. Tasso's wins as a two-year-old helped make Fappiano the leading freshman sire of 1985.

In the Fasig-Tipton Florida sales of 1984, Tasso was sold for $100,000 to Bertram Firestone, but Firestone was reportedly dissatisfied and returned the colt. Tasso was also offered at the Fasig-Tipton Saratoga sales, but his reserve price of $50,000 was not met. Tasso subsequently raced for Gerald Robbins and was trained by Neil Drysdale.

== Racing career ==
Tasso raced seven times at age two in 1985, scoring five wins with one second and one third. After misbehaving in the post parade, he finished third in his first start on May 31, 1985 in a maiden special weight race at Hollywood Park in California. He returned nearly two months later with a win in a similar race, then followed up with a victory in a 1-mile allowance race at Del Mar racetrack. On September 11, he stepped up in class to enter the Grade I Del Mar Futurity, where he was ridden by Laffit Pincay Jr. to a close win over the filly Arewehavingfunyet. He was then shipped to Keeneland race track in Kentucky, where he first finished second in an allowance race and then won the Breeders' Futurity Stakes.

For the most important race of the year for his age group, Tasso's owner had to pay a supplemental fee of $120,000 to enter the colt in the Breeders' Cup Juvenile, which was raced that year at Aqueduct Racetrack in Queens, New York. Tasso was the third betting choice in a field of 13; Storm Cat was the favorite. In the early stages of the race, Storm Cat raced in third and then went to the lead around the far turn. Tasso was in eighth place down the backstretch then moved to the outside of the field and started to close ground, catching Storm Cat in the final stride to win by a nose. Tasso's performances earned him U.S. Champion 2-Yr-Old Colt honors for 1985.

Racing at age three, Tasso again made seven starts, ending the season with two wins, two seconds, and two third-place finishes. He began his 3-year-old campaign with a three-length win in the Manassa Mauler Stakes at Aqueduct Racetrack. He then finished second in the Gotham and fourth in the Wood Memorial, so his connections decided to bypass the Triple Crown series. Instead he was entered in the Withers Stakes, in which he finished second, and then the Jersey Derby, in which he finished third. After a short break, he returned with a win in the El Cajon Stakes at Del Mar. He finished the year with a third-place finish in the Yankee Valor Handicap.

At age four, Tasso started nine times, winning two allowance races. The highlight of the year was a dead heat for second behind Ferdinand in the Grade I Hollywood Gold Cup.

== Stud career ==
Retired to stud, Tasso met with only modest success. In 2000, he was moved to the Janadriyah Stud Farm near Riyadh, Saudi Arabia, owned by Prince Abdul Aziz bin Abdullah. As of 2009, he was a pensioner at that farm.
