= Precisionist (horse) =

American-bred Thoroughbred racehorse (1981–2006)

- Sire: Crozier
- Grandsire: My Babu
- Dam: Excellently
- Damsire: Forli
- Sex: Stallion
- Foaled: 1981
- Country: USA
- Colour: Chestnut
- Breeder: Fred W. Hooper
- Owner: Fred W. Hooper
- Trainer: L. Ross Fenstermaker; John W. Russell (1988)
- Record: 46: 20-10-4
- Earnings: $3,485,398

Major wins
- Swaps Stakes (1984); San Miguel Stakes (1984); Malibu Stakes (1985); San Fernando Stakes (1985); Charles H. Strub Stakes (1985); Breeders' Cup Sprint (1985); Californian Stakes (1986); Woodward Stakes (1986); San Pasqual Handicap (1986); Del Mar Breeders' Cup Handicap (1988); Cabrillo Handicap (1988)

Awards
- U.S. Champion Sprint Horse (1985)

Honours
- United States Racing Hall of Fame (2003)
- Last updated on March 17, 2008

Precisionist (February 28, 1981 – September 27, 2006) was an American Hall of Fame Thoroughbred racehorse.

== Race career ==
In 1985, Precisionist won the Strub Series at Santa Anita Park, becoming only the fifth horse to win the Malibu Stakes, the San Fernando Stakes, and the Charles H. Strub Stakes. Winner of an Eclipse Award as a champion sprinter and a Breeders' Cup Sprint winner, Precisionist was also victorious in races beyond a mile including Grade I races at 1¼ miles.

In 1986, he won the Woodward Stakes over Lady's Secret (eventual Horse of the Year). In the fall, he and Turkoman were the heavy favorites for the Breeders' Cup Classic but ran third and second respectively to upset winner Skywalker.

In 1988, overcoming a 20-month layoff and a fracture to his left foreleg that was repaired with a pin, Precisionist set the current one-mile track record at Del Mar Racetrack in 1:33 1/5. William Donovan handled training duties for Precisionist's final start when he finished twelfth in the 1988 Sunny Isle Handicap at Calder Race Course.

== Stud career ==
Retired initially at age 6, Precisionist proved nearly sterile, siring only four offspring in three foal crops. He produced three daughters and a son, all started and two were winners; none were stakes winners. His progeny earned a total of $34,230. He managed to become a one-time proven dam-sire when his daughter, Preciseness, produced the graded stakes winner Dawn Again, and his granddaughters had several stakes performers.

Due to his inability to effectively produce offspring, the Herod sire line became extinct in North America.

== Retirement ==
As a result of his inability to reliably produce foals, his owners returned him to racing under trainer John Russell. He was permanently retired after a successful 1988 campaign. Several attempts were made to improve his fertility, but nothing worked to satisfaction. He was sent to live at a farm in Ocala, Florida where he remained until June 2006 when he was sent to the Old Friends, Inc. equine retirement center near Georgetown, Kentucky.

== Death ==
Diagnosed with inoperable sinus tumors, Precisionist was euthanized on September 27, 2006. He was buried in his entirety at the Old Friends cemetery.
