= Fred W. Hooper =

American racehorse owner and breeder

Fred Hooper
- Born: October 6, 1897; Cleveland, Georgia; United States
- Died: August 4, 2000 (aged 102); Miami, Florida
- Education: Public school: Grade 8
- Occupations: Businessman, Racehorse owner/breeder
- Spouses: Laura C. Girdner Hooper, Wanda Hooper
- Children: Betty, Fred Jr., Robin, Kay
- Honors: Eclipse Award for Outstanding Breeder (1975, 1982); Fred W. Hooper Handicap at Gulfstream Park

Fred William Hooper (October 6, 1897 – August 4, 2000) was an American Thoroughbred racehorse owner and breeder. He was a member of The Jockey Club, an honorary director of the Breeders' Cup, and one of the founders of the Thoroughbred Owners and Breeders Association and one of its first presidents.

== Early years ==
Born in Cleveland, Georgia, Hooper quit school in the eighth grade and worked as a schoolteacher, a carpenter, a riveter, a prizefighter and a potato farmer. He would make his fortune in the heavy construction business. He bought 5,000 acres (20 km^{2}) near Montgomery, Alabama and started breeding champion Hereford cattle and eventually horses. He later built the Circle H Farm, an 1,100-acre (4.5 km^{2}) horse breeding operation in Ocala, Florida.

== Thoroughbred Racing ==
Hooper won the 1945 Kentucky Derby with his first thoroughbred, Hoop Jr. In his 50 years as a horse-breeder, Hooper bred or raced the winners of more than one hundred stakes races. Among his other notable horse were U.S. Racing Hall of Fame inductees Precisionist and Susan's Girl.

In 1975 and again in 1982, Fred Hooper was voted the Eclipse Award for Outstanding Breeder. In 1992, he was voted the Eclipse Award Of Merit, the industry's highest honor. In 1995 he was inducted in the Calder Race Course Hall of Fame.

Fred Hooper was responsible for bringing top Latin American riders to the United States. Hall of Fame jockeys Laffit Pincay Jr., Braulio Baeza, and Jorge Velásquez all got their start with him.

== Death & Legacy ==
Hooper died at the age of 102 in Ocala, Florida. The Fred W. Hooper Handicap at Gulfstream Park is named in his honor. Hooper Academy in Hope Hull, Alabama is named in his honor.
