= First Samurai (horse) =

American-bred Thoroughbred racehorse

- Sire: Giant's Causeway
- Grandsire: Storm Cat
- Dam: Freddie Frisson
- Damsire: Dixieland Band
- Sex: Stallion
- Foaled: February 2, 2003
- Country: United States
- Colour: Chestnut
- Breeder: John D. Gunther
- Owner: Bruce Lunsford, Tom Hansen, Tom Morris & Lansdon B. Robbins III
- Trainer: Frank L. Brothers
- Record: 8: 5–1–1
- Earnings: $915,075

Major wins
- Hopeful Stakes (2005); Champagne Stakes (2005); Fountain of Youth Stakes (2006)
- Last updated on August 7, 2019

First Samurai is an American-bred Thoroughbred racehorse foaled on February 2, 2003. A talented colt with a strong pedigree, he emerged as one of the top juveniles of his generation. As a two-year-old in 2005, he captured the prestigious Hopeful Stakes and the Champagne Stakes, quickly marking himself as a contender for the Triple Crown in 2006.

Going into his three-year-old season, expectations were high. He began the year with a victory in the Fountain of Youth Stakes, albeit via disqualification of the original winner. However, in the Blue Grass Stakes at Keeneland Race Course, a starting gate incident hampered his performance, and he finished fifth. Two weeks later, veterinary examinations revealed that he had sustained two broken ribs during the race, diagnosed via ultrasound. As a result, he was withdrawn from the Kentucky Derby, and the Blue Grass proved to be the final race of his career.

== Connections ==
First Samurai was bred in Kentucky by John D. Gunther. He was owned by Bruce Lunsford, Tom Hansen, Tom Morris, and Raymond Coudriet, and trained by Frank Brothers. Over the course of his racing career, he was ridden by notable jockeys such as Pat Day and Jerry Bailey (both now retired), as well as Edgar Prado, who was still active during First Samurai's racing years.

== Racing record ==
Finish	Race	Distance	Track	Condition
5th	Blue Grass Stakes	1 1/8 miles (1.8 km)	Keeneland Race Course	Fast
1st (by DQ)	Fountain of Youth Stakes	1 1/8 miles (1.8 km)	Gulfstream Park	Fast
2nd	Hutcheson Stakes	15/16 mile (1.5 km)	Gulfstream Park	Sloppy
3rd	Breeders' Cup Juvenile	1 1/16 miles (1.7 km)	Belmont Park	Fast
1st	Champagne Stakes	1 mile (1.6 km)	Belmont Park	Sloppy (sealed)
1st	Hopeful Stakes	7/8 mile (1.4 km)	Saratoga Race Course	Fast
1st	Allowance	6/8 mile (1.2 km)	Saratoga Race Course	Fast
1st	Maiden	6/8 mile (1.2 km)	Churchill Downs	Fast

In his career, which was cut short by injury, he started 8 times, winning 5 races, placing in 1, and showing in 1, earning a total of $915,075.

== Stud career ==
First Samurai was retired to stud at the Hancock family's Claiborne Farm near Paris, Kentucky. His introductory stud fee in 2007 was $40,000. Standing alongside other Claiborne stallions such as Pulpit, Seeking the Gold, During, Eddington, and Strong Hope, he quickly became a notable sire.

First Samurai's descendants include:

c = colt, f = filly

Foaled	Name	Sex	Major Wins
2009	Lea	c	Donn Handicap, Hal's Hope Stakes
2008	Justin Phillip	c	Alfred G. Vanderbilt Handicap, Count Fleet Sprint Handicap
2009	Last Gunfighter	c	Hawthorne Gold Cup Handicap, Philip H. Iselin Stakes, Pimlico Special
2009	Northern Passion	c	Natalma Stakes
2010	Executiveprivilege	c	Chandelier Stakes, Del Mar Debutante Stakes
2011	Stacked Deck	c	Kennedy Road Stakes, Bold Venture Stakes
2014	Sharp Samurai	c	City of Hope Mile Stakes, Twilight Derby, Del Mar Derby
2014	Miss Sky Warrior	f	Gazelle Stakes, Davona Dale Stakes, Demoiselle Stakes
2016	Cutting Humor	c	Sunland Derby

== Pedigree ==
Pedigree of First Samurai (USA), 2003
Sire Giant's Causeway (USA) 1997	Storm Cat (USA); 1983	Storm Bird	Northern Dancer
Sire Giant's Causeway (USA) 1997	Storm Cat (USA); 1983	Storm Bird	South Ocean
Sire Giant's Causeway (USA) 1997	Storm Cat (USA); 1983	Terlingua	Secretariat
Sire Giant's Causeway (USA) 1997	Storm Cat (USA); 1983	Terlingua	Crimson Saint
Sire Giant's Causeway (USA) 1997	Mariah's Storm (USA); 1991	Rahy	Blushing Groom
Sire Giant's Causeway (USA) 1997	Mariah's Storm (USA); 1991	Rahy	Glorious Song
Sire Giant's Causeway (USA) 1997	Mariah's Storm (USA); 1991	Immense	Roberto
Sire Giant's Causeway (USA) 1997	Mariah's Storm (USA); 1991	Immense	Imsodear
Dam Freddie Frisson (USA) 1993	Dixieland Band (USA); 1980	Northern Dancer	Nearctic
Dam Freddie Frisson (USA) 1993	Dixieland Band (USA); 1980	Northern Dancer	Natalma
Dam Freddie Frisson (USA) 1993	Dixieland Band (USA); 1980	Mississippi Mud	Delta Judge
Dam Freddie Frisson (USA) 1993	Dixieland Band (USA); 1980	Mississippi Mud	Sand Buggy
Dam Freddie Frisson (USA) 1993	Frisson (USA); 1988	Fappiano	Mr. Prospector
Dam Freddie Frisson (USA) 1993	Frisson (USA); 1988	Fappiano	Killaloe
Dam Freddie Frisson (USA) 1993	Frisson (USA); 1988	Mavera	Reviewer
Dam Freddie Frisson (USA) 1993	Frisson (USA); 1988	Mavera	Miz Spock
