= Sharp Samurai =

American Thoroughbred racehorse

- Sire: First Samurai
- Grandsire: Giant's Causeway
- Dam: Secret Wish
- Damsire: Street Cry
- Sex: Stallion
- Foaled: March 9, 2014
- Country: USA
- Breeder: Cudney Stables
- Owner: Red Baron's Barn LLC, Rancho Temescal LLC and Glatt, Mark
- Trainer: Mark Glatt
- Jockey: Juan J. Hernandez
- Record: 20:8-4-2
- Earnings: $881,270

Major wins
- City of Hope Mile Stakes (2018); Twilight Derby (2017); Del Mar Derby (2017)

Sharp Samurai (foaled March 9, 2014) is an American Thoroughbred racehorse and the winner of the 2018 City of Hope Mile Stakes.

== Career ==
Sharp Samurai's first race was on November 5, 2016, at Santa Anita, where he came in 8th. He was able to pick up his first win in his next race on February 10, 2017, in a Maiden Claiming race at Santa Anita.

He grabbed his first stakes win six races into his career, when he won the Rainbow Stakes on June 10, 2017, at Santa Anita. He defeated 2nd-place finisher, Conquest Fahrenheit, by 1 and 1/4 lengths to win $75,000.

This victory started a four win race streak. His next victory came on August 6, 2017, when he captured his first graded stakes win–the Grade III La Jolla Handicap. He came in at 1:1 odds as the favorite and defeated Fashion Business by a length.

On September 3, 2017, he picked up a Grade II win at the Del Mar Derby. He came into the race as the 2:1 favorite and was able to beat Big Score by a half-length and Bowies Hero by a full-length.

On October 28, 2017, he won the Grade II Twilight Derby. He came in again as the race favorite at 2:1 odds and again defeated Big Score and Bowies Hero for the win.

He came in 2nd at both the Del Mar Mile Handicap and the Eddie Read Stakes in 2017. He did not get another stakes race victory until October 6, 2018, when he came in first at the Grade II City of Hope Mile Stakes. He came in as the 6:5 favorite and won by a nose over 2:1 Fly to Mars.

Sharp Samurai had more close calls, but no victories in his 2019 season. He came in 3rd at the 2019 Grade III American Stakes in June and came in 2nd at the Grade II Del Mar Handicap in August, which was his last race of the season.

He had similar luck to start his 2020 season with another 3rd-place finish at the 2020 American Stakes and a 2nd-place finish at the July 26th, 2020, Eddie Read Stakes, which was won by United.

== Retirement ==
In 2021, Sharp Samurai was retired to Old Friends in Georgetown, Kentucky.

== Pedigree ==
Pedigree of Sharp Samurai (USA), 2014
Sire First Samurai	Giant's Causeway	Storm Cat	Storm Bird
Sire First Samurai	Giant's Causeway	Storm Cat	Terlingua
Sire First Samurai	Giant's Causeway	Mariah's Storm	Rahy
Sire First Samurai	Giant's Causeway	Mariah's Storm	Immense
Sire First Samurai	Freddie Frisson	Dixieland Band	Northern Dancer
Sire First Samurai	Freddie Frisson	Dixieland Band	Mississippi Mud
Sire First Samurai	Freddie Frisson	Frisson	Fappiano
Sire First Samurai	Freddie Frisson	Frisson	Mavera
Dam Secret Wish	Street Cry	Machiavellian	Mr. Prospector
Dam Secret Wish	Street Cry	Machiavellian	Coup De Folie
Dam Secret Wish	Street Cry	Helen Street	Troy
Dam Secret Wish	Street Cry	Helen Street	Waterway
Dam Secret Wish	Awesome Lass	Awesome Again	Deputy Minister
Dam Secret Wish	Awesome Lass	Awesome Again	Primal Force
Dam Secret Wish	Awesome Lass	Smart N irish	Smarten
Dam Secret Wish	Awesome Lass	Smart N irish	Ocre Jaune
