= Aragorn (horse) =

Irish-bred Thoroughbred racehorse

- Sire: Giant's Causeway
- Grandsire: Storm Cat
- Dam: Onaga
- Damsire: Mr. Prospector
- Sex: Stallion
- Foaled: 2002
- Country: Ireland
- Colour: Chestnut
- Record: 14: 6-5-1
- Earnings: US$1,529,325

Major wins
- Oak Tree Derby (2005); Eddie Read Handicap (2006); Shoemaker Breeders' Cup Mile (2006); Del Mar Breeders' Cup Handicap (2006); Oak Tree Breeders' Cup Mile (2006)

Aragorn (foaled in 2002) is an Irish millionaire Thoroughbred racehorse who won major Graded stakes races in 2005 and 2006.

== Career ==
Aragorn's first race was on 12 July 2004 at Cork, where he came in second place.

He captured his first win at the 2005 Oak Tree Derby.

His next win came on 29 May 2006 at the Shoemaker Mile Stakes. His next race, on 23 July 2006, also resulted in a win at the 2006 Eddie Read Stakes.

On 26 August 2006 he won the Del Mar Mile Handicap, then captured the final win of his career at the 2006 City of Hope Mile Stakes.

== Stud career ==
Aragorn descendants include:

c = colt, f = filly

Foaled	Name	Sex	Major Wins
2010	Shining Copper	f	Fort Lauderdale Stakes, River City Handicap

He retired to stud at Lane's End Farm in Kentucky.

== Pedigree ==
Pedigree of Aragorn (USA), 2002
Sire Giant's Causeway	Storm Cat	Storm Bird	Northern Dancer
Sire Giant's Causeway	Storm Cat	Storm Bird	South Ocean
Sire Giant's Causeway	Storm Cat	Terlingua	Secretariat
Sire Giant's Causeway	Storm Cat	Terlingua	Crimson Saint
Sire Giant's Causeway	Mariah's Storm	Rahy	Blushing Groom
Sire Giant's Causeway	Mariah's Storm	Rahy	Glorious Song
Sire Giant's Causeway	Mariah's Storm	Immense	Roberto
Sire Giant's Causeway	Mariah's Storm	Immense	Imsodear
Dam Onaga	Mr. Prospector	Raise a Native	Native Dancer
Dam Onaga	Mr. Prospector	Raise a Native	Raise You
Dam Onaga	Mr. Prospector	Gold Digger	Nashua
Dam Onaga	Mr. Prospector	Gold Digger	Sequence
Dam Onaga	Savannah Dancer	Northern Dancer	Nearctic
Dam Onaga	Savannah Dancer	Northern Dancer	Natalma
Dam Onaga	Savannah Dancer	Valoris	Tiziano
Dam Onaga	Savannah Dancer	Valoris	Vali
