= United (horse) =

American thoroughbred racehorse

- Sire: Giant's Causeway
- Grandsire: Storm Cat
- Dam: Indy Punch
- Damsire: Pulling Punches
- Sex: Gelding
- Foaled: 2015
- Country: United States
- Color: Chestnut
- Breeder: Rosemont Farm LLC
- Owner: LNJ Foxwoods (Larry, Nanci & Jaime Roth)
- Trainer: Richard E. Mandella
- Record: 22:10-4-1
- Earnings: $1,813,549

Major wins
- San Marcos Stakes (2020); Charles Whittingham Stakes (2020); Eddie Read Stakes (2020, 2021); John Henry Turf Championship Stakes (2020, 2021); San Luis Rey Stakes (2021)
- Last updated on November 23, 2021

United (foaled April 7, 2015, in Kentucky) is an American Thoroughbred racehorse and winner of multiple top-level stakes races for owners Larry and Nanci Roth and their daughter Jaime.

== Career ==
United's first race was on May 27, 2018, at Woodbine Racetrack in Toronto, Ontario, where he came in 5th.

On July 4, 2018, he picked up his win first in a Maiden Special Weight race at Woodbine. This was his last win of the season and his last until April 6, 2019, when he won an Allowance Optional Claiming race.

He competed in his first stakes race on May 25, 2019, when he came in 2nd place at the 2019 Charles Whittingham Stakes. This would be the start of four straight podium finishes at stakes races, as he finished 3rd at the 2019 John Henry Turf Championship Stakes, 2nd at the 2019 Breeders' Cup Turf and 2nd at the 2019 Hollywood Turf Cup Stakes.

He finally captured his first stakes race on February 1, 2020, when he won the Grade-2 2020 San Marcos Stakes. He came into the race as the 4:5 favorite and won by a half-length over Cleopatra's Strike.

United earned another stakes win on May 23, 2020, when he won the Grade 2 Charles Whittingham Stakes. He defeated Rockemperor by less than a nose in a photo-finish for the $200,500 cash prize.

United grabbed this third Grade-2 stakes win in a row when he won the July 26, 2020, Eddie Read Stakes. In the final stretch, United was able to outrun Sharp Samurai and Neptune's Storm for the win.

In 2021 United continued excellent form winning the Grade 3 San Luis Rey Stakes in March and repeating as a winner of the Eddie Read Stakes and John Henry Turf Championship Stakes.

== Pedigree ==
Pedigree of United (USA), 2015
Sire Giants Causeway	Storm Cat	Storm Bird	Northern Dancer
Sire Giants Causeway	Storm Cat	Storm Bird	South Ocean
Sire Giants Causeway	Storm Cat	Terlingua	Secretariat
Sire Giants Causeway	Storm Cat	Terlingua	Crimson Saint
Sire Giants Causeway	Mariah's Storm	Rahy	Blushing Groom
Sire Giants Causeway	Mariah's Storm	Rahy	Glorious Song
Sire Giants Causeway	Mariah's Storm	Immense	Roberto
Sire Giants Causeway	Mariah's Storm	Immense	Imsodear
Dam Indy Punch	Pulling Punches	Two Punch	Mr. Prospector
Dam Indy Punch	Pulling Punches	Two Punch	Heavenly Cause
Dam Indy Punch	Pulling Punches	Voo Doo Dance	Stage Door Johnny
Dam Indy Punch	Pulling Punches	Voo Doo Dance	Witch Dance
Dam Indy Punch	Indy Flash	A.P. Indy	Seattle Slew
Dam Indy Punch	Indy Flash	A.P. Indy	Weekend Surprise
Dam Indy Punch	Indy Flash	Mirror Bright	Gleaming
Dam Indy Punch	Indy Flash	Mirror Bright	Pet Eagle
