= Dreamer (2005 film) =

- Theatrical release poster
- Directed by: John Gatins
- Written by: John Gatins
- Produced by: Brian Robbins; Hunt Lowry; Michael Tollin
- Starring: Kurt Russell; Dakota Fanning; Kris Kristofferson; Freddy Rodriguez; Luis Guzmán; Elisabeth Shue; David Morse
- Cinematography: Fred Murphy
- Edited by: David Rosenbloom
- Music by: John Debney
- Production companies: Hyde Park Entertainment; Tollin/Robbins Productions
- Distributed by: DreamWorks Pictures
- Release dates: September 10, 2005 (TIFF); October 21, 2005 (United States)
- Running time: 105 minutes
- Country: United States
- Language: English
- Budget: $32 million
- Box office: $39.5 million

Dreamer (also known as Dreamer: Inspired by a True Story) is a 2005 American sports drama film written and directed by John Gatins in his directorial debut. It is inspired by the true story of an injured Thoroughbred racehorse named Mariah's Storm. The film stars Kurt Russell, Dakota Fanning, Kris Kristofferson, Freddy Rodriguez, Luis Guzmán, Elisabeth Shue, and David Morse.

Dreamer premiered at the Toronto International Film Festival on September 10, 2005, and was theatrically released in the United States by DreamWorks Pictures on October 21, 2005. The film received mixed reviews from critics, and earned $39.5 million on a $32 million budget. It also received a Critics' Choice Award nomination for Best Family Film.

== Plot ==
Ben Crane, a horse trainer, neglects his precocious daughter Cale while he pours his heart into the care of the horses that he trains. Determined to make good on an overdue promise, Cale prods him to take her along to work and succeeds. Soñador, a horse that is to race that day, refuses to leave her stall. Ben mentions that one of her legs feels warm, but his boss, Palmer, tells him to get Soñador on the track. During the race, the horse injures herself severely that Palmer demands that she be put down. Having Cale along and not wanting her to see this, Ben strikes a bargain with Palmer and becomes the new owner of the wounded horse, but he loses his job as a result. With no job and facing foreclosure on his property, he decides to breed Soñador, nicknamed Sonya, who gets a cast on her injured leg and begins to recover.

Cale, having fallen in love with Soñador, sneaks out to the barn at night to see her. She then sneaks over to see her grandfather, 'Pop', Ben's dad, who loves teaching her about horses. They go to a farm to pick a stallion to breed with Soñador, but the stud fee is too high. Pop gives Ben some money to use to breed, and Ben reluctantly takes it. But before they can breed, the vet tests Soñador and finds out she is infertile.

After, Cale hears her father tell her mother, Lilly, that Soñador has ruined them because she cannot have a foal. Lilly responds that Soñador is the best thing that happened to them, alluding to the fact that Ben is finally spending time with Cale. Frustrated, Ben says that if Cale wasn't there the day when Soñador was hurt, he would have let her be put down. Hurt, Cale sets out to run away from home and saddles Soñador. Not knowing of this plan, Ben enters the barn. The door slams behind him, and Soñador bolts with Cale hanging on for dear life. Ben scrambles to his truck and sets out after them. He catches up and gets Cale to safety, noticing how fast Soñador is despite her previous injury.

The family decides to race Sonya, but she is claimed after the race, and Cale becomes angry at her father for entering the horse in a claiming race. At a parent-teacher night at school, Ben reads a story that Cale wrote about a king and his horse, and he realizes how much their family needs Soñador. He buys her back with money from his father. Cale decides to race Soñador in the Breeders' Cup Classic, with Manny, Ben's colleague, as the jockey. They start training and get a wealthy sponsor.

On the day of the race, Ben notices that Sonya's leg is warm and contemplates not racing her, fearing that she might get injured again. However, Sonya refuses to go back in the stall. Manny and Sonya enter the race and win.

== Cast ==
- Kurt Russell as Benjamin "Ben" Crane
- Dakota Fanning as Cale Crane
- Kris Kristofferson as "Pop" Crane
- Elisabeth Shue as Lillian "Lilly" Crane
- David Morse as Everett Palmer
- Freddy Rodríguez as Manolin "Manny" Vallarta
- Luis Guzmán as Balon
- Oded Fehr as Prince Sadir
- Ken Howard as William "Bill" Ford
- Holmes Osborne as "Doc" Fleming
- Sacrifice (horse actor) as Soñador

== Production ==
The film is loosely inspired by the story of the mare Mariah's Storm. She was a promising filly who was being pointed towards the Breeders' Cup Juvenile Fillies in 1993 but then broke her cannon bone (the incident is mentioned in the film by Soñador's veterinarian). She recovered and later won some graded stakes races. She started in the 1995 Breeders' Cup Distaff and finished ninth. She was owned by Thunderhead Farms and trained by the father and son team of Don Von Hemel and Donnie K. Von Hemel. She is now known mostly for being the dam of Giant's Causeway. In the movie, when Cale and Ben go to Ashford Stud to check out the studs, the stallions they are naming, such as Fusaichi Pegasus, Giant's Causeway, Johannesburg, and Grand Slam, are real horses who actually stand at Ashford. However, the actual stallions were not used in filming. Stand-ins were placed in their stalls instead. In the scene where Soñador is considered for the Breeder's Cup, Prince Sadir says that his horse "Rapid Cat is sired by Storm Cat, the best sire in the world." Coincidentally, Mariah's Storm (on whom Soñador is based) was bred to Storm Cat.

While doing research in Kentucky, the director/writer came upon a vet who told him about a racehorse who miraculously made a comeback after a serious injury, and he loosely based the script on this story. After four years of intensive search and an initial studio rejection, the film was picked up by DreamWorks. The role of Cale Crane was originally written for a boy, and the role was changed specifically so that Fanning could play it. The first script that was sent to her actually had the word "boy" in the character description.

To produce the soundtrack, an advance showing of this film was shown to a number of recording artists, who were then asked to submit ideas for theme songs. Bethany Dillon's song "Dreamer" was chosen out of the submissions. After the movie, Kurt Russell bought Dakota Fanning a real Palomino horse, whom she named Goldie.

== Music ==
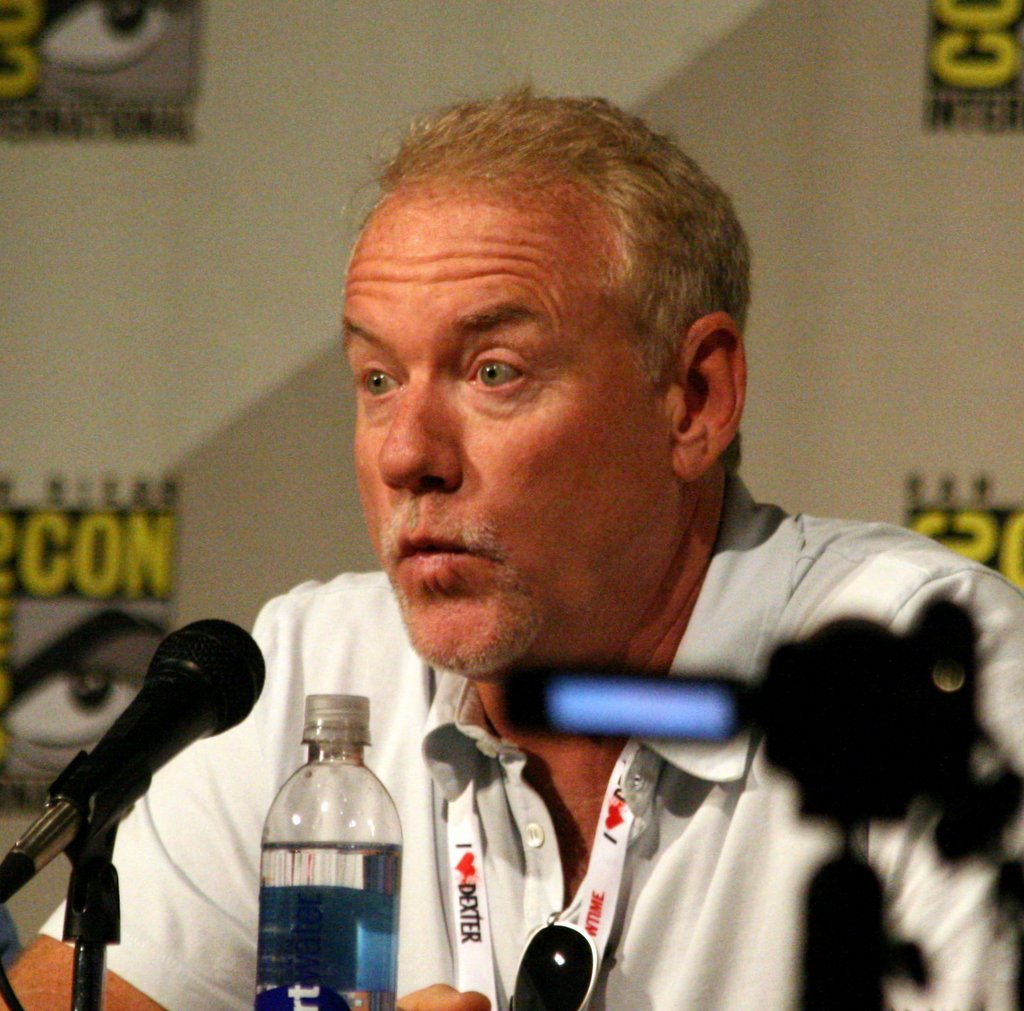
John Debney composed the film's score.

- "Theme From Dreamer"
- "The Stand Off: 1st Ride"
- "First Race"
- "Ben Asks Pop For Help"
- "Sonador In Harness"
- "Popsicles"
- "Manny's Story"
- "Testing Sonador's Leg"
- "2nd Ride: Thunderpants"
- "Runaway Horse"
- "Exercising Sonador"
- "The Noble King"
- "New Owner Montage"
- "Training Montage"
- "Smart And Beautiful"
- "Sonador Chosen"
- "Cale Won't Sell Sonador"
- "Leaving Sadir's"
- "She's Ready To Run"
- "She Wants To Race"
- "Last Race"
- "End Credit Medley"
- "Dreamer" (Film Mix) – Bethany Dillon
- "Main Title" (Film Version)
- "Dreamer" [Hidden Bonus Track] (Pop Mix)

== Release ==
Dreamer premiered at the Toronto International Film Festival on September 10, 2005, and was theatrically released in the United States by DreamWorks Pictures on October 21, 2005.

== Reception ==
=== Box office ===
Dreamer opened in second place at the box office behind Doom, with $9,178,233 earned for a $4,573 average from 2,007 theaters. In its second weekend, it held well with a 33.2% drop to fourth place with $6,132,856 earned for a $2,462 average from being expanded to 2,491 theaters and lifting its two-week total to $17,374,339. It held up even better in its third weekend, only slipping 21.8% to sixth place and $4,794,741 for a $1,832 average from being expanded to 2,617 theaters. In its fourth weekend, it once again held well with a 22.2% slide to $3,728,510 and ninth place, for a $1,363 average from being expanded to its widest release, 2,735 theaters.

The film closed on January 5, 2006, after 77 days of release and grossing $32,751,093 domestically along with an additional $5,990,639 overseas for a worldwide total of $38,741,732. Produced on a $32 million budget, the film performed average at the box office, as it barely recouped its budget.

=== Critical response ===
On Rotten Tomatoes, the film has a rating of 64%, based on 117 reviews, with an average rating of 6.3/10. The site's critical consensus reads, "Though formulaic, this horse story's saving grace is its strong performances." On Metacritic, the film has a weighted average score of 59 out of 100, based on reviews 28 critics, indicating "mixed or average" reviews. Audiences polled by CinemaScore gave the film a rare grade of "A+" on an A+ to F scale.

Roger Ebert of the Chicago Sun-Times gave it 3 out of 4 stars, and called "A well-made use of familiar materials." He praised the central performance of Dakota Fanning, and the understated performances by Russell, Kristofferson and Morse. Joe Leydon of Variety called it "Modestly engaging but mostly unexceptional." Kirk Honeycutt of The Hollywood Reporter said it "Recycles just about every sentimental ploy and cliche from a raft of horse racing movies."

=== Accolades ===
Award	Category	Recipient	Result
Critics' Choice Award	Best Family Film (Live Action)		Nominated
ESPY Award	Best Sports Movie		Nominated
Kids' Choice Awards	Favorite Movie Actress	Dakota Fanning	Nominated
Young Artist Award	Best Performance in a Feature Film (Comedy or Drama)- Leading Young Actress and Best Family Feature Film - Drama	Dakota Fanning	Won

== See also ==
- List of films about horses
- List of films about horse racing
