= Vexatious (horse) =

American thoroughbred racehorse

- Sire: Giant's Causeway
- Grandsire: Storm Cat
- Dam: Dream of Summer
- Damsire: Siberian Summer
- Sex: Mare
- Foaled: April 9, 2014
- Country: USA
- Breeder: James C. Weigel & Giant's Causeway Syndicate, LLC.
- Owner: Calumet Farm
- Trainer: Jack Sisterson
- Jockey: Jose Lezcano
- Record: 22:3-3-7
- Earnings: $448,985

Major wins
- Personal Ensign Stakes (2020); Dowager Stakes (2018)

Vexatious (foaled April 9, 2014) is an American Thoroughbred racehorse and the winner of the 2020 Personal Ensign Stakes.

== Career ==
Vexatious's first race was on October 28, 2016, at Santa Anita, where she came in third. She picked up her first win in a Maiden Special Weight race on November 26, 2016, at Del Mar.

She started competing in stakes races during the 2017 season. Through five stakes races, her best results were 3rd-place finishes at the Grade-2 April 1, 2017 Fair Grounds Oaks and the April 14th, 2017, Grade-3 Fantasy Stakes.

Vexatious did not pick up another win until August 15, 2018, when she won the listed August 15, 2018, CTT and TOC Stakes (Black Type) at Del Mar.

On October 21, 2018, she won her first graded stakes race when she won the Grade-3 2018 Dowager Stakes after Beach Flower was disqualified. Vexatious came into the race at 4:1 odds and received $75,000 for the victory. She followed the victory up with a 3rd-place finish at the November 22nd, 2018, Grade-3 Red Carpet Handicap to close the 2018 season.

She had a disappointing 2019 season going winless. Her best results were 2nd-place finishes at the Grade-3 July Modesty Handicap and the August Summer Colony Stakes.

Her 2020 season did not start out much better, as she was only able to manage a 5th-place finish in an Allowance Optional Claiming Race, a 3rd-place finish in an Allowance race and a 2nd-place finish at the Grade-2 Ruffian Stakes. Her luck finally changed though on August 1, 2020. At 9:1 odds, she defeated favorite Midnight Bisou and captured her first ever Grade-1 victory by winning the Personal Ensign Stakes.

== Pedigree ==
Pedigree of Vexatious (USA), 2014
| Sire Giants Causeway (USA) b. 1997 | Storm Cat (USA) b. 1983 | Storm Bird | Northern Dancer |
| Sire Giants Causeway (USA) b. 1997 | Storm Cat (USA) b. 1983 | Storm Bird | Bricks and Mortar |
| Sire Giants Causeway (USA) b. 1997 | Storm Cat (USA) b. 1983 | Terlingua | Secretariat |
| Sire Giants Causeway (USA) b. 1997 | Storm Cat (USA) b. 1983 | Terlingua | Crimson Saint |
| Sire Giants Causeway (USA) b. 1997 | Mariah's Storm (USA) b. 1991 | Rahy | Blushing Groom |
| Sire Giants Causeway (USA) b. 1997 | Mariah's Storm (USA) b. 1991 | Rahy | Glorious Song |
| Sire Giants Causeway (USA) b. 1997 | Mariah's Storm (USA) b. 1991 | Immense | Roberto |
| Sire Giants Causeway (USA) b. 1997 | Mariah's Storm (USA) b. 1991 | Immense | Imsodear |
| Dam Dream of Summer (USA) b. 1999 | Siberian Summer (USA) b. 1989 | Siberian Express | Caro |
| Dam Dream of Summer (USA) b. 1999 | Siberian Summer (USA) b. 1989 | Siberian Express | Indian Call |
| Dam Dream of Summer (USA) b. 1999 | Siberian Summer (USA) b. 1989 | Mia Karina | Icecapade |
| Dam Dream of Summer (USA) b. 1999 | Siberian Summer (USA) b. 1989 | Mia Karina | Basin |
| Dam Dream of Summer (USA) b. 1999 | Marys Dream (USA) b. 1990 | Skywalker | Relaunch |
| Dam Dream of Summer (USA) b. 1999 | Marys Dream (USA) b. 1990 | Skywalker | Bold Captive |
| Dam Dream of Summer (USA) b. 1999 | Marys Dream (USA) b. 1990 | Proper Mary | Properantes |
| Dam Dream of Summer (USA) b. 1999 | Marys Dream (USA) b. 1990 | Proper Mary | My Mary |
