= Giant's Causeway (horse) =

American-bred, Irish-trained Thoroughbred racehorse

- Sire: Storm Cat
- Grandsire: Storm Bird
- Dam: Mariah's Storm
- Damsire: Rahy
- Sex: Stallion
- Foaled: 1997
- Country: United States
- Colour: Chestnut
- Breeder: Orpendale and Michael Tabor
- Owner: Sue Magnier and Michael Tabor
- Trainer: Aidan O'Brien
- Record: 13: 9–4–0
- Earnings: $3,078,989

Major wins
- Futurity Stakes (1999); Prix de la Salamandre (1999); Gladness Stakes (2000); St. James's Palace Stakes (2000); Eclipse Stakes (2000); Sussex Stakes (2000); Juddmonte International Stakes (2000); Irish Champion Stakes (2000)

Awards
- Cartier Horse of the Year (2000); Leading sire in North America (2009, 2010, 2012); Leading broodmare sire in North America (2018); Timeform rating: 132

Honours
- Giant's Causeway Stakes at Keeneland (2006– )
- Last updated on 23 February 2024

Giant's Causeway (14 February 1997 – 16 April 2018) was an American-bred, Irish-trained Thoroughbred racehorse who won five Group One races in Great Britain and Ireland as a three-year-old in 2000: the St James's Palace Stakes, Eclipse Stakes, Sussex Stakes, Juddmonte International Stakes and Irish Champion Stakes. He was named the 2000 Cartier Horse of the Year. The horse was sent to stud and proved to be an outstanding sire.

Nicknamed the "Iron Horse" on account of his toughness and constitution, Giant's Causeway was hailed by his trainer Aidan O'Brien as a "true champion".

== Background ==
Giant's Causeway was a chestnut horse with a white blaze. He was bred in Kentucky by Coolmore Stud and Michael Tabor. His sire Storm Cat was the 1999 and 2000 leading sire in North America, and his dam Mariah's Storm also produced Freud, the 2008 leading sire in New York.

== Racing career ==
=== 1999: Two-year-old season ===
As a two-year-old in 1999, Giant's Causeway was unbeaten in three races: a maiden race at Naas, the Futurity Stakes at the Curragh and the Prix de la Salamandre at Longchamp.

=== 2000: Three-year-old season ===
In the spring of 2000, Giant's Causeway won the Gladness Stakes at the Curragh and then finished second in both the 2000 Guineas and the Irish 2000 Guineas.

He then won five straight Group One races: the St. James's Palace Stakes at Royal Ascot, the Eclipse Stakes at Sandown Park, the Sussex Stakes at Goodwood, the Juddmonte International Stakes at York and the Irish Champion Stakes at Leopardstown.

His winning sequence was broken in the Queen Elizabeth II Stakes at Ascot on 23 September, when he was beaten half a length by Observatory. On his final racecourse appearance, Giant's Causeway was sent to the United States to contest the Breeders' Cup Classic at Churchill Downs in which he raced on dirt for the first time. Starting at odds of 7.6/1, he was beaten only a neck into second place by the American colt Tiznow.

Giant's Causeway's performances in 2000 earned him European Horse of the Year honours.

== Retirement and breeding career ==
In 2001, Giant's Causeway started his stud career at Coolmore Stud in Ireland. He stood one season there before relocating to Coolmore's United States branch Ashford Stud in Versailles, Kentucky. He was a great success at stud, becoming one of the most influential sires in North America. In 2006, he stood for a fee of $300,000.

Giant's Causeway died at the Ashford Stud on 16 April 2018 after a "brief illness" at the age of 21.

== Notable progeny ==
Giant Causeway's notable descendants include:

c = colt, f = filly

Foaled	Name	Sex	Major Wins
2002	Footstepsinthesand	c	2000 Guineas
2002	My Typhoon	f	Diana Stakes
2002	Maids Causeway	f	Coronation Stakes
2002	Aragorn	c	Oak Tree Derby, Eddie Read Stakes, Shoemaker Mile Stakes, Del Mar Mile Handicap
2002	Shamardal	c	Poule d'Essai des Poulains, St James's Palace Stakes, Vintage Stakes, Dewhurst Stakes
2003	Heatseeker	c	Santa Anita Handicap
2003	Frost Giant	c	Suburban Handicap
2003	First Samurai	c	Hopeful Stakes
2004	Mike Fox	c	Queen's Plate
2004	Suzuka Causeway	c	Keio Hai Spring Cup
2004	Swift Temper	f	Ruffian Stakes, Delaware Handicap, Groupie Doll Stakes
2004	Red Giant	c	Virginia Derby, Fourstardave Handicap, Clement L. Hirsch Turf Championship Stakes
2005	Cowboy Cal	c	Oak Tree Mile Stakes, Strub Stakes, San Pasqual Handicap, Bryan Station Stakes
2006	Ghanaati	c	1000 Guineas Stakes
2007	Eishin Apollon	f	Mile Championship
2007	Await the Dawn	f	Hardwicke Stakes, Kilternan Stakes
2007	Eskendereya	c	Wood Memorial Stakes, Pilgrim Stakes, Fountain of Youth Stakes
2009	Creative Cause	c	Norfolk Stakes, San Felipe Stakes
2009	Irish Mission	c	Glens Falls Stakes, La Prevoyante Stakes
2010	Rite of Passage	c	Ascot Gold Cup
2010	Red Rifle	c	Bowling Green Handicap, Dominion Day Stakes
2011	Protonico	c	Alysheba Stakes, Discovery Handicap
2012	Take Charge Brandi	c	Breeders' Cup Juvenile Fillies
2013	Aquaphobia	c	United Nations Stakes
2013	Brody's Cause	c	Breeders' Futurity Stakes, Blue Grass Stakes
2014	Bricks and Mortar	c	Manhattan Handicap, Turf Classic Stakes, Pegasus World Cup Turf, Arlington Million, Breeders' Cup Turf
2014	Vexatious	f	Personal Ensign Stakes
2019	Classic Causeway	c	Belmont Derby

He is also the damsire of three-time Dubai Turf winner Lord North, two-time Champions Cup winner Lemon Pop, and Lovcen, winner of the Hopeful Stakes, Satsuki Sho, and Japanese Derby.

== Pedigree ==
Pedigree of Giant's Causeway
Sire Storm Cat	Storm Bird	Northern Dancer	Nearctic
Sire Storm Cat	Storm Bird	Northern Dancer	Natalma
Sire Storm Cat	Storm Bird	South Ocean	New Providence
Sire Storm Cat	Storm Bird	South Ocean	Shining Sun
Sire Storm Cat	Terlingua	Secretariat	Bold Ruler
Sire Storm Cat	Terlingua	Secretariat	Somethingroyal
Sire Storm Cat	Terlingua	Crimson Saint	Crimson Satan
Sire Storm Cat	Terlingua	Crimson Saint	Bolero Rose
Dam Mariah's Storm	Rahy	Blushing Groom	Red God
Dam Mariah's Storm	Rahy	Blushing Groom	Runaway Bride
Dam Mariah's Storm	Rahy	Glorious Song	Halo
Dam Mariah's Storm	Rahy	Glorious Song	Ballade
Dam Mariah's Storm	Immense	Roberto	Hail To Reason
Dam Mariah's Storm	Immense	Roberto	Bramalea
Dam Mariah's Storm	Immense	Imsodear	Chieftain
Dam Mariah's Storm	Immense	Imsodear	Ironically
