= Sham Stakes =

American horse race

- Class: Grade III
- Location: Santa Anita Park; Arcadia, California, United States
- Inaugurated: 2001
- Race type: Thoroughbred - Flat racing
- Website: www.santaanita.com/

Race information
- Distance: 1 mile (8 furlongs)
- Surface: Dirt
- Track: Left-handed
- Qualification: Three-year-olds
- Weight: 124 lbs with allowances
- Purse: $100,000 (since 2012)

The Sham Stakes is a Grade III American Thoroughbred horse race for horses aged three years old over the distance of one mile on the dirt scheduled annually in January at Santa Anita Park in Arcadia, California. The event currently carries a purse of $100,000.

== History ==
The event was inaugurated on 9 February 2001 over a distance of 1 1/8 miles and was won by the US Hall of Fame trained Bob Baffert's Wild and Wise who was entered as an entry with Special Times. He was ridden by the entry with Special Times. He was ridden by the US Hall of Fame jockey Victor Espinoza winning by half a length in a time of 1:50.51.

The event is named in honor for the racehorse Sham, winner of the 1973 Santa Anita Derby and remembered for his battles with Secretariat in that year's U.S. Triple Crown Races.

The event was upgraded to Grade III in 2006.

In 2011 distance for the event was decreased to 1 1/16 miles and once again the following year was decreased to 1 mile. Since 2011 the event has been held early in January.

An official prep race for the Kentucky Derby with qualification points.

== Records ==
Speed record:

- 1 mile – 1:34.56 - Out of Bounds (2012)
- 1 1/8 mile – 1:47.86 - The Pamplemousse (2009)

Margins:

- 7 3/4 lengths – Authentic (2020)

Most wins by a jockey:

- 4 - Alex Solis (2003, 2004, 2009, 2010)
- 4 - Garrett Gomez (2007, 2008, 2011, 2012)
- 4 - Victor Espinoza (2001, 2005, 2006, 2017)
- 4 - Mike E. Smith (2014, 2018, 2019, 2021)

Most wins by a trainer:

- 9 - Bob Baffert (2001, 2006, 2014, 2016, 2018, 2020, 2021, 2022, 2023)

Most wins by an owner:

- 3 - Golconda Stable (2020, 2022, 2023)
- 3 - Madaket Stables (2020, 2022, 2023)
- 3 - SF Racing (2020, 2022, 2023)
- 3 - Starlight Racing (2020, 2022, 2023)

== Winners ==
Year	Winner	Jockey	Trainer	Owner	Distance	Time	Purse	Grade	Ref
2024	Race Not Held								
2023	Reincarnate	Juan J. Hernandez	Bob Baffert	Golconda Stable, Madaket Stables, SF Racing, Siena Farm, Starlight Racing, Stonestreet Stables, Waves Edge Capital, Catherine Donovan, Robert E. Masterson & Jay A. Schoenfarber	1 mile	1:35.87	$100,000	III	
2022	Newgrange	John Velazquez	Bob Baffert	Golconda Stable, Madaket Stables, SF Racing, Siena Farm, Starlight Racing, Stonestreet Stables, Waves Edge Capital, Catherine Donovan, Robert E. Masterson & Jay A. Schoenfarber	1 mile	1:38.32	$100,000	III	
2021	Life Is Good	Mike E. Smith	Bob Baffert	China Horse Club & WinStar Farm	1 mile	1:36.63	$100,000	III	
2020	Authentic	Drayden Van Dyke	Bob Baffert	SF Racing, Starlight Racing, Madaket Stables, F. Hertrich III, J.D. Fielding & Golconda Stables	1 mile	1:37.57	$100,500	III	
2019	Gunmetal Gray	Mike E. Smith	Jerry Hollendorfer	Jerry Hollendorfer, Pearl Racing & West Point Thoroughbreds	1 mile	1:38.96	$100,702	III	
2018	McKinzie	Mike E. Smith	Bob Baffert	Karl Watson, Michael E. Pegram & Paul Weitman	1 mile	1:36.58	$100,345	III	
2017	Gormley	Victor Espinoza	John Shirreffs	Mr. & Mrs. Jerome Moss	1 mile	1:35.89	$100,690	III	
2016	Collected	Martin Garcia	Bob Baffert	Speedway Stable	1 mile	1:38.00	$100,750	III	
2015	Calculator	Elvis Trujillo	Peter L. Miller	Richard C. Pell	1 mile	1:34.88	$100,750	III	
2014	Midnight Hawk	Mike E. Smith	Bob Baffert	Hill 'n' Dale Farms, Mike Kitchen, Michael E. Pegram, Mike Tice & Joel Quenneville	1 mile	1:36.48	$98,000	III	
2013	Goldencents	Kevin Krigger	Doug F. O'Neill	W.C. Racing, Dave Kenney & RAP Racing	1 mile	1:36.50	$100,000	III	
2012	Out of Bounds	Garrett K. Gomez	Eoin G. Harty	Darley Stud	1 mile	1:34.56	$100,000	III	
2011	Tapizar	Garrett K. Gomez	Steven M. Asmussen	Winchell Thoroughbreds	1 1/16 miles	1:40.38	$100,000	III	
2010	Alphie's Bet	Alex O. Solis	Alexis Barba	Teresa McWilliams & Peter O. Johnson Sr.	1 1/8 miles	1:48.72	$150,000	III	
2009	The Pamplemousse	Alex O. Solis	Julio C. Canani	Jeffrey Strauss, Bienstock and Winner Stables, Alex Solis II, Tom Lenner & Skyline Stables	1 1/8 miles	1:47.86	$200,000	III	
2008	Colonel John	Garrett K. Gomez	Eoin G. Harty	WinStar Farm	1 1/8 miles	1:50.15	$200,000	III	
2007	Ravel	Garrett K. Gomez	Michael W. McCarthy	Michael Tabor & Derrick Smith	1 1/8 miles	1:48.91	$101,500	III	
2006	Bob and John	Victor Espinoza	Bob Baffert	Stonerside Stable	1 1/8 miles	1:49.15	$102,500	III	
2005	Going Wild	Victor Espinoza	D. Wayne Lukas	Robert & Beverly Lewis	1 1/8 miles	1:50.18	$102,300	Listed	
2004	Master David	Alex O. Solis	Robert J. Frankel	Georgica Stable, Stephen Mack & Andrew Rosen	1 1/8 miles	1:49.20	$81,400	Listed	
2003	Man Among Men	Alex O. Solis	Gary Mandella	Randell D. Hubbard & Constance Sczesny	1 1/8 miles	1:48.39	$81,000	Listed	
2002	U S S Tinosa	Kent J. Desormeaux	Jerry Hollendorfer	Peter Abruzzo & Barry Thiriot	1 1/8 miles	1:49.11	$78,650	Listed	
2001	§ Wild and Wise	Victor Espinoza	Bob Baffert	Golden Eagle Farm	1 1/8 miles	1:50.51	$96,750		

Legend:
All Weather Track Dirt
Notes:
§ Ran as an entry

== See also ==
- List of American and Canadian Graded races
- Road to the Kentucky Derby
