= The Pamplemousse =

American-bred Thoroughbred racehorse

- Sire: Kafwain
- Grandsire: Cherokee Run
- Dam: Comfort Zone
- Damsire: Rubiano
- Sex: Stud
- Foaled: 2006
- Country: United States
- Colour: Roan (Gray)
- Breeder: Clarkland Farm
- Owner: Bienstock and Winner Stable (Ann Winner and Carol Bienstock), Alex Solis II, J. Strauss, T. Lenner, and Davenport
- Trainer: Julio Canani
- Record: 5: 3-0-1
- Earnings: $209,280

Major wins
- San Rafael Stakes (2009); Sham Stakes (2009)

The Pamplemousse (foaled April 19, 2006 in Kentucky) is an American Thoroughbred racehorse and stallion. Known for his speed, he was a contender for the 2009 Kentucky Derby and Triple Crown but had to withdraw due to injury. His regular jockey was Alex Solis.

== Background ==
The Pamplemousse was bred in Kentucky by Fred and Nancy Mitchell's Clarkland Farm. He is sired by Kafwain, a multiple graded stakes winner, and is out of the Rubiano mare Comfort Zone. Comfort Zone, a half-sister to four stakes winners and the dam of Gr.I winner Stormello, also produced stakes winner American Lady (by Stormy Atlantic) and graded stakes-placed Emmzy (by Eskendereya).

"Pamplemousse" is French for "grapefruit".

As a yearling, The Pamplemousse was sold for $80,000 at the 2007 Fasig-Tipton Kentucky July Sale. and was later sold for $150,000 as a two-year-old at the Ocala Breeders' Sales March Sale.

He was trained by Julio Canani, who stated that The Pamplemousse "had more raw ability than any horse I ever trained."

== Racing career ==
The Pamplemousse broke his maiden at Hollywood Park on December 14, 2008. He won the San Rafael Stakes for his 3-year-old debut, defeating Square Eddie, and was also victorious in the Sham Stakes, leading the entire way and winning by 6 lengths. According to the media: "he is that rare thoroughbred with sharp speed and the ability to carry it over a distance of ground." However, The Pamplemousse was scratched from the Santa Anita Derby on the morning of the race on the advice of the vet. It was announced on April 5, 2009, that he was out of the Derby due to a tendon flare-up, and would be sidelined as long as 6 months.

It was reported in May 2010 that The Pamplemousse resumed training after recently undergoing tests that showed he could resume exercise with trainer Canani. He was scheduled to start off with light jogging, and the plan was to have him ready to race at Del Mar Racetrack when it opened for its 2010 summer meet.

The Pamplemousse was officially retired from racing in 2010. While training for his return to racing, he developed ankle problems. “He wasn’t finishing as strong in his last two works,” said Alex Solis II, one of The Pamplemousse's owners. “It was his ankles. There were no chips. There was some remodeling that was going on. We decided we didn’t want to take any chances.”

== Stallion career and later career ==
The Pamplemousse entered stud in 2011 at Rancho San Miguel in San Miguel, California, for a stud fee of $3500.

The Pamplemousse was met with modest success as a stallion. His best performer is multiple black-type stakes winner North County Guy, a gelding who was claimed in his ninth start for $20,000 and has earned $538,527 through 2021.

Due to the stallion's declining popularity, Rancho San Miguel sought to find a suitable home for The Pamplemousse. Stevee Keller, a show horse trainer in Idaho, expressed interest in the stallion after speaking with consignor Adrian Gonzalez, who works with the farm, at a sale. Gonzalez asked if Keller had a preference for particular bloodlines in her show horses."I told him the one that is really up-and-coming are with The Pamplemousse babies. I have, like, four that are on their way to becoming two-star, three-star, almost up to Olympic level, three-day eventing horses. Adrian just laughed." After meeting with Clay Murdock, the manager of Rancho San Miguel, Keller acquired The Pamplemousse and he was brought to her Edgeview Equestrian Center, near Eagle, Idaho. She plans to train him in eventing and eventually stand him as a stallion of show horses.
