= Silic =

French-bred Thoroughbred racehorse

- Sire: Sillery
- Grandsire: Blushing Groom
- Dam: Balletomane
- Damsire: Sadler's Wells
- Sex: Stallion
- Foaled: 1995
- Country: France
- Colour: Bay
- Breeder: Simoes de Almeida Armenio
- Owner: Terrence Lanni, Bernard Schiappa and Kenneth Poslosky
- Trainer: Julio C. Canani
- Record: 15: 8-2-0
- Earnings: $1,422,299

Major wins
- Prix Pontarme (1998); Prix de la Jonchere (1998); Breeders' Cup Mile (1999); Oak Tree Breeders' Cup Mile Stakes (1999); Shoemaker Breeders' Cup Mile Stakes (1999, 2000)
- Last updated on November 27, 2006

Silic (1995–2013) is a French Thoroughbred racehorse who competed both in France and in the United States. His most notable win came in the 1999 Breeders' Cup Mile.

Retired after the 2000 racing season, Silic stood at stud at Crestwood Farm in Lexington, Kentucky then for 2007 was sent to Getaway Thoroughbred Farm in Romoland, California.
