= Dowager Stakes =

- Class: Grade III
- Location: Keeneland Race Course, Lexington, Kentucky United States
- Inaugurated: 1992
- Race type: Thoroughbred - Flat racing - Turf
- Sponsor: Rood and Riddle (since 2019)
- Website: www.keeneland.com

Race information
- Distance: 1 1/2 miles
- Surface: Turf
- Track: Left-handed
- Qualification: Fillies and Mares, three years old and older
- Weight: Base weight with allowances 4-year-olds and up: 125 lbs. 3-year-olds: 122 lbs.
- Purse: $350,000 (since 2025)

The Dowager Stakes is a Grade III American Thoroughbred horse race for fillies and mares that are three years old or older, over a distance of 1 1/2 miles on the turf held annually in October at Keeneland Race Course, Lexington, Kentucky during the autumn meeting. The event currently carries a purse of $350,000.

== History ==
The race was inaugurated in 1992 and the event was run over the 1 1/8 miles distance.

In 1994 the event was extended to the current distance of 1 1/2 miles.

In 2015 the event was upgraded to a Grade III.

== Records ==
Speed record:

- 1 1/2 miles – 2:27.98 - Temple City Terror (2022)

Margins:

- 7 lengths – Casablanca Smile (2010)

Most wins by a jockey

- 4 – Shane Sellers (1994, 1995, 1996, 1999)

Most wins by a trainer

- 4 – H. Graham Motion (2004, 2015, 2020, 2023)

Most wins by an owner

- 2 – Augustin Stable (2007, 2015)
- 2 – H. Joseph Allen (2006, 2017)

== Winners ==
Year	Winner	Age	Jockey	Trainer	Owner	Distance	Time	Purse	Grade	Ref
2026	Malibu Smart	6	Ben Curtis	Michael J. Maker	Michael M. Hui & Phil Forte	1 1/2 miles	2:33.27	$346,250	III	
2025	Venencia (FR)	5	Ben Curtis	Brendan P. Walsh	Bradley Thoroughbreds, Laura Leigh Stables, Jim Cone, Belmar Racing and Breeding, Team Hanley, Cambron Equine LLC	1 1/2 miles	2:35.69	$262,000	III	
2024	Chop Chop	4	Luan Machado	Brad H. Cox	Selective	1 1/2 miles	2:29.00	$296,738	III	
2023	Romagna Mia (GB)	4	John R. Velazquez	H. Graham Motion	Team Valor International	1 1/2 miles	2:29.87	$260,025	III	
2022	Temple City Terror	6	Tyler Gaffalione	Brendan P. Walsh	Pocket Aces Racing & Somewhere Stable Kentucky	1 1/2 miles	2:27.98	$294,688	III	
2021	Summer in Saratoga	5	Corey Lanerie	Joe Sharp	Highlander Training Center	1 1/2 miles	2:30.02	$150,000	III	
2020	Blame Debbie	3	Manuel Franco	H. Graham Motion	Eclipse Thoroughbred Partners, Michael P. Cloonan & Timothy C. Thornton	1 1/2 miles	2:34.74	$125,000	III	
2019	Gentle Ruler	4	Chris Landeros	Ian R. Wilkes	Morsches Stable	1 1/2 miles	2:31.95	$125,000	III	
2018	Vexatious (Note: Won after Beach Flower who was first past the post was disqualified)	4	Florent Geroux	Neil D. Drysdale	Calumet Farm	1 1/2 miles	2:32.40	$125,000	III	
2017	Apple Betty (IRE)	4	John R. Velazquez	Claude R. McGaughey III	H. Joseph Allen	1 1/2 miles	2:30.80	$125,000	III	
2016	Elektrum (IRE)	5	Drayden Van Dyke	John W. Sadler	Hronis Racing	1 1/2 miles	2:33.08	$125,000	III	
2015	Kitten's Point	5	Edgar S. Prado	H. Graham Motion	Augustin Stable	1 1/2 miles	2:30.37	$125,000	III	
2014	White Rose	4	Shaun Bridgmohan	William I. Mott	Jake Ballis & Rashar Lewis	1 1/2 miles	2:31.34	$125,000	Listed	
2013	Preferential (GB)	4	Leandro D. Goncalves	William I. Mott	Juddmonte Farm	1 1/2 miles	2:33.11	$125,000	Listed	
2012	Upperline	5	James Graham	Michael Stidham	Stone Farm, J.H. Adger, Oakcrest Farm & M. Stidham	1 1/2 miles	2:32.19	$125,000	Listed	
2011	Senada	4	Edgar S. Prado	Barclay Tagg	Lael Stables	1 1/2 miles	2:31.19	$125,000	Listed	
2010	Casablanca Smile (CHI)	4	Javier Castellano	Claude R. McGaughey III	Green Hills Farm	1 1/2 miles	2:33.70	$125,000	Listed	
2009	Black Mamba (NZ)	6	Robby Albarado	John W. Sadler	Doubledown Stables	1 1/2 miles	2:37.07	$125,000	Listed	
2008	Herboriste (GB)	5	Julien R. Leparoux	Michael R. Matz	Northern Bloodstock	1 1/2 miles	2:31.16	$150,000	Listed	
2007	Omeya (CHI)	7	Mark Guidry	Jonathan E. Sheppard	Augustin Stable	1 1/2 miles	2:31.15	$150,000	Listed	
2006	Louve Royale (IRE)	5	Julien R. Leparoux	Patrick L. Biancone	H. Joseph Allen	1 1/2 miles	2:32.59	$150,000	Listed	
2005	Briviesca (GB)	4	John Jacinto	William I. Mott	Darpat S.L. Stables	1 1/2 miles	2:38.77	$150,000	Listed	
2004	Humaita (GER)	4	Robby Albarado	H. Graham Motion	Andreas Jacobs	1 1/2 miles	2:33.28	$150,000	Listed	
2003	Spice Island	4	Cornelio H. Velasquez	John S. Pregman Jr.	Denlea Park	1 1/2 miles	2:31.93	$150,000	Listed	
2002	Lapuma	5	Larry Melancon	Alton H. Quanbeck	Highclere Stables	1 1/2 miles	2:35.17	$112,200	Listed	
2001	Only to You	5	Robby Albarado	Mark Frostad	Sam-Son Farm	1 1/2 miles	2:35.77	$111,400	Listed	
2000	Illiquidity	4	Jon K. Court	Patrick B. Byrne	Stonerside Stable	1 1/2 miles	2:30.45	$113,600	Listed	
1999	Moments of Magic	4	Shane Sellers	George R. Arnold II	G. Watts Humphrey Jr. & L.I. Humphrey Trust	1 1/2 miles	2:29.80	$113,400	Listed	
1998	Verinha (BRZ)	4	Pat Day	D. Wayne Lukas	Padua Stables	1 1/2 miles	2:31.35	$84,525	Listed	
1997	Sagar Pride (IRE)	4	Shane Sellers	Patrick B. Byrne	Scuderia Sant' Ambroeus	1 1/2 miles	2:31.20	$58,500	Listed	
1996	Ampulla	5	Shane Sellers	Patrick B. Byrne	North Cliff Farms	1 1/2 miles	2:32.80	$65,000	Listed	
1995	Sudana	4	Shane Sellers	Nicholas P. Zito	Allen E. Paulson	1 1/2 miles	2:37.80	$58,000	Listed	
1994	Market Booster	4	Pat Day	D. Wayne Lukas	Moyglare Stud	1 1/2 miles	2:31.20	$57,940	Listed	
1993	Navarra	5	Brent E. Bartram	Steven L. Morguelan	Craig B. Singer	1 1/8 miles	1:49.20	$46,375		
1992	Green Noble	6	Steven Ronald Bahen	Emile M. Allain	Jurgen Schemmer	1 1/8 miles	1:50.00	$44,450		

== See also ==
- List of American and Canadian Graded races
