= Val Royal =

French-bred Thoroughbred racehorse

- Sire: Royal Academy
- Grandsire: Nijinsky
- Dam: Vadlava
- Damsire: Bikala
- Sex: Stallion
- Foaled: 1996
- Country: France
- Colour: Bay
- Breeder: Jean-Luc Lagardere
- Owner: David Milch
- Trainer: 1) André Fabre (France); 2) Julio C. Canani (USA)
- Record: 12: 7-2-0
- Earnings: US$1,186,687

Major wins
- Prix de Guiche (1999); Prix Guillaume d'Ornano (1999); Del Mar Derby (1999); Oak Tree Mile Stakes (2001) Breeders' Cup wins: Breeders' Cup Mile (2001)

Val Royal (April 7, 1996 – October 17, 2008) was a French-bred Thoroughbred racehorse who competed successfully in France and the United States and was best known for winning the 2001 Breeders' Cup Mile.

== Background ==
Val Royal was bred and raced by Jean-Luc Lagardere. His dam was Vadlava, a daughter of 1981 French Derby winner Bikala. His sire, Royal Academy, won the 1990 Breeders' Cup Mile.

== Racing career ==
=== France ===
Val Royal made his racing debut at Longchamp Racecourse with a win on October 25, 1998. This was his only start at two. He began his three-year-old campaign in 1999 with a win in a Listed race at Chantilly Racecourse on May 3, then on May 20 won his first try in a Conditions race, capturing the 1,800 m (5,900 ft) Prix de Guiche at Longchamp. Sent to England for that country's most prestigious race, The Derby at 1 1/2 miles (2.4 km) on soft turf, Val Royal finished eleventh in a field of sixteen. Back in France, he earned a runner-up finish in the 1,800 m (5,900 ft) Prix Daphnis, then, after winning the 2,000 m (6,600 ft) Group 2 Prix Guillaume d'Ornano at Deauville Racecourse, he was sold in a private transaction to American Television producer David Milch.

=== United States ===
Brought to California, Val Royal was trained by Julio Canani. In his first start in the United States on September 6, 1999, at Del Mar Racetrack, the horse charged from far back to win the Grade II Del Mar Derby. A series of minor ailments kept him out of racing for the remainder of 1999 and all of 2000. Unraced for nineteen months, Val Royal returned on March 3, 2001, finishing second in the G II Frank E. Kilroe Mile Handicap at Santa Anita Park. Once again, an injury kept him out of racing, this time for seven months. Returning on October 7, he came from last place at the turn for home to win Santa Anita's Oak Tree Mile Stakes by more than two lengths in a quick time of 1:33.21.

==== Record run in the Breeders' Cup Mile ====
Following his win in the Oak Tree Mile, Val Royal was shipped east to Belmont Park in Elmont, New York, to compete in the October 27 Breeders' Cup Mile. He was last as the field turned for home but swung eight-wide on the turn, running the final two furlongs (400 metres) in 0:22 to win by two lengths. His time for the mile of 1:32.05 was the fastest in the history of the race and is a record that going into 2010 has not been matched.

Scheduled to go to Hong Kong's Sha Tin Racecourse to run in the Hong Kong Mile, Val Royal developed a quarter crack that saw him sidelined him until March 2, 2002, when he returned to Santa Anita and finished fourth in the Frank E. Kilroe Mile Handicap. Sent to Nad Al Sheba Racecourse in Dubai for the 2002 Dubai Duty Free Stakes, he finished fifth in a sixteen-horse field in his final race.

== Stud record ==
In April 2002, Val Royal suffered a career-ending tendon injury and was then sold to a breeding operation. He stood from 2003 through 2006 at Oak Lodge Stud in County Kildare, Ireland and was shuttled to Eliza Park stud near Kerrie, Victoria, Australia, for the Southern Hemisphere breeding seasons. In 2007 and 2008, he stood at the Irish National Stud plus was shuttled to Brazil.

While standing at Haras Basano in São Paulo, Brazil, on October 17, 2008, Val Royal collapsed suddenly in the paddock and died from a suspected internal hemorrhage. During his short career as a stallion, he sired more than seventy winners, including:

- Cockney Rebel (b. 2004) – won English Classic 2,000 Guineas Stakes and Irish 2,000 Guineas;
- Valbenny (b. 2004) – multiple-stakes-winning filly in the U.S., including the Honeymoon Handicap.
