= Kentucky Cup Distaff Stakes =

- Class: Grade III
- Location: Turfway Park; Florence, Kentucky, United States
- Inaugurated: 1986
- Race type: Thoroughbred - Flat racing
- Website: www.turfway.com

Race information
- Distance: 1 1/16 miles (8.5 furlongs)
- Surface: Polytrack
- Track: left-handed
- Qualification: Fillies & Mares, Three-years-old & up
- Weight: Assigned
- Purse: $100,000

The Kentucky Cup Distaff Stakes is an American Thoroughbred horse race run annually at Turfway Park in Florence, Kentucky. The Grade III event is run near the end of the fall meet and is open to fillies and mares aged three and older. Contested on Polytrack synthetic dirt at a distance of one and one-sixteenth miles, the race offered a purse of $100,000 in 2008.

Before 2008, the race was part of the Breeders' Cup Stakes Program and carried $75,000 in additional purse money from the Breeders' Cup Fund. Until 2007 the race was called the Turfway Breeders' Cup Stakes.

With the support of WinStar Farm, this race which was suspended in 2010 due to economic challenges, will return in 2011.

== Records ==
Speed record

- 1:41.60 - Mariah's Storm (1995)

Most wins

- 2 - Fit For A Queen (1991, 1992)
- 2 - Trip (2001, 2002)

Most wins by an owner

- 2 - Hermitage Farm (1991, 1992)
- 2 - Claiborne Farm (2001, 2002)

Most wins by a jockey

- 2 - Chris McCarron (1989, 1994)
- 2 - Ricardo Lopez (1991, 1992)
- 2 - Willie Martinez (1999, 2006)
- 2 - Pat Day (2000, 2002)

Most wins by a trainer

- 4 - D. Wayne Lukas (1989, 1996, 2000, 2004)
- 3 - William I. Mott (1997, 2005, 2009)

== Winners of the Kentucky Cup Distaff Stakes ==
Year	Winner	Age	Jockey	Trainer	Owner	Time
2011	La Gran Bailadora	4	Corey Lanerie	Mike Maker	Tracy Farmer	1:44.90
2010	No Race					
2009	Indescribable	5	Garrett Gomez	William I. Mott	Courtlandt Farms	1:42.92
2008	Bear Now	4	Eurico Rosa Da Silva	Reade Baker	Bear Stables	1:43.37
2007	Danzon	4	Julien Leparoux	Patrick Biancone	H. Joseph Allen	1:43.42
2006	Beautiful Bets	6	Willie Martinez	Glenn Wismer	Casa De Caballos	1:42.79
2005	Miss Fortunate	5	Larry Melancon	William I. Mott	Lyon Stables	1:44.48
2004	Susan's Angel	3	Rafael Bejarano	D. Wayne Lukas	S. Angel Stable	1:44.21
2003	Smok'n Frolic	4	Edgar Prado	Todd Pletcher	Dogwood Stable	1:44.98
2002	Trip	5	Pat Day	C. R. McGaughey III	Claiborne Farm	1:43.00
2001	Trip	4	Craig Perret	Frank L. Brothers	Claiborne Farm	1:42.40
2000	Spain	3	Pat Day	D. Wayne Lukas	Thoroughbred Corp.	1:44.80
1999	Ruby Surprise	4	Willie Martinez	Robert E. Holthus	James T. Hines, Jr.	1:44.80
1998	Biding Time	4	Corey Nakatani	Mark Hennig	Edward P. Evans	1:43.00
1997	Feasibility Study	5	Mike E. Smith	William I. Mott	Char-Mari Stable	1:42.40
1996	Golden Attraction	3	Gary Stevens	D. Wayne Lukas	Overbrook Farm	1:42.40
1995	Mariah's Storm	4	Robert Lester	Donnie K. Von Hemel	Thunderhead Farm	1:41.60
1994	Pennyhill Park	4	Chris McCarron	Roger Attfield	Anderson Farms	1:44.20
1993	Gray Cashmere	4	Dean Kutz	Peter Vestal	Willmott Stables	1:43.20
1992	Fit For A Queen	6	Ricardo Lopez	Steven Penrod	Hermitage Farm	1:43.20
1991	Fit For A Queen	5	Ricardo Lopez	Steven Penrod	Hermitage Farm	1:43.20
1990	Barbarika	5	Aaron Gryder	Philip M. Hauswald	Fares Farm	1:44.00
1989	Winning Colors	4	Chris McCarron	D. Wayne Lukas	Eugene V. Klein	1:44.80
1988	Darien Miss	3	Patrick Johnson	George R. Arnold II	Taylor Asbury	1:43.60
1987	In Neon	5	Michael McDowell	Robert L. De Sensi	Merly Ann Cassidy	1:45.20
1986	Gypsy Prayer	5	M. Bryan	James D. Frederiksen	T. H. Seale	1:43.20
