= Shoemaker Mile Stakes =

- Class: Grade I
- Location: Santa Anita Park; Arcadia, California, USA
- Inaugurated: 1938 (as the Premiere Handicap)
- Race type: Thoroughbred – Flat racing
- Website: Santa Anita Park

Race information
- Distance: 1 mile (8 furlongs)
- Surface: Turf
- Track: Left-handed
- Qualification: Three-year-olds and older
- Weight: Base weights with allowances: 4-year-olds and up: 126 lbs. 3-year-olds: 118 lbs.
- Purse: $300,000 (2024)

The Shoemaker Mile Stakes is a Grade I American Thoroughbred horse race for horses age three years old and older over a distance of one mile on the turf held annually in late May at Santa Anita Park in Arcadia, California, USA. The event currently carries a purse of $300,000.

== History ==
Inaugurated in 1938 as the Premiere Handicap over a distance of six furlongs at Hollywood Park Racetrack in Inglewood, California.

In 1950, there were two separate races, one in the Spring called Preview Handicap at six furlongs and the autumn race as The Premiere Handicap at seven furlongs.

In 1984 & 1985, the event was run in two divisions and held on the turf for the first time.

In 1990 it was renamed to honor U.S. Racing Hall of Fame jockey Bill Shoemaker.

In 2014 when Hollywood Park Racetrack closed the race was moved to Santa Anita Park.

=== Distance ===
Since inception, the race has been contested at a variety of distances:

- 1 mile on turf: 1988–1991, 1993–present
- 1 1/16 miles: 1978–1980 on main track, 1986–87 on Turf
- 7 furlongs on main track: 1950 in Autumn Meet (Premiere Handicap)
- 6 furlongs on main track: 1938–1941, 1944–1947, 1949, 1950 as Spring renewal (Preview Handicap), 1951–1977
- Not run in 1942–1943, 1948, 1981–1983, 1992

== Winners ==
Year	Winner	Age	Jockey	Trainer	Owner	Time	Purse	Grade
Shoemaker Mile Stakes (Santa Anita Park)
2026	Formidable Man	5	Flavien Prat	Michael W. McCarthy	William K. Warren Jr. and Suzanne Warren	1:32.52	$300,000	I
2025	King of Gosford (GB)	4	Flavien Prat	Philip D'Amato	Benowitz Family Trust, CYBT, Gevertz, Saul, Nentwig, Michael and Peskoff, Jeremy	1:33.52	$300,000	I
2024	Johannes	4	Umberto Rispoli	Tim Yakteen	Cuyathy, LLC	1:33.00	$300,000	I
2023	Exaulted	6	Juan Hernandez	Peter Eurton	C R K Stable	1:34.08	$500,500	I
2022	Count Again (CAN)	7	Irad Ortiz Jr	Philip D'Amato	Agave Racing Stable and Sam-Son Farm	1:32.40	$500,500	I
2021	Smooth Like Strait	4	Umberto Rispoli	Michael McCarthy	Cannon Thoroughbreds	1:34.19	$300,500	I
2020	Raging Bull	5	Joel Rosario	Chad C. Brown	Peter M. Brant	1:32.73	$300,000	I
2019	Bolo	7	Florent Geroux	Carla Gaines	Golden Pegasus Racing, Inc.	1:34.07	$500,000	I
2018	Hunt (IRE)	6	Flavien Prat	Philip D'Amato	Michael House	1:34.07	$400,000	I
2017	Bal a Bali (BRZ)	6	Mike E. Smith	Richard Mandella	Calumet Farm	1:32.22	$400,000	I
2016	Midnight Storm	5	Rafael Bejarano	Philip D'Amato	A Venneri Racing/Little Red Feather Racing	1:33.55	$400,000	I
2015	Talco (FR)	4	Rafael Bejarano	John W. Sadler	Hronis Racing	1:35.00	$400,000	I
2014	Obviously (IRE)	6	Joe Talamo	Philip D'Amato	Fanticola & Scardino	1:32.66	$400,000	I
Shoemaker Mile Stakes (Hollywood Park)
2013	Obviously (IRE)	5	Joe Talamo	Mike R. Mitchell	Fanticola & Scardino	1:32.86	$300,000	I
2012	Jeranimo	6	Garrett Gomez	Michael Pender	B.J. Wright	1:33.97	$300,000	I
2011	Courageous Cat	5	Patrick Valenzuela	William I Mott	Pam & Martin Wygod	1:33.19	$300,000	I
2010	Victor's Cry	5	Corey Nakatani	Eoin Harty	Equilete Stable	1:32.88	$250,000	I
2009	Thorn Song	6	Mike Smith	Dale Romans	Zayat Stables	1:33.33	$250,000	I
2008	Daytona (IRE)	4	Alex Solis	Dan Hendricks	Skyline St, Bienstock & Winner St, Lenner et al.	1:33.44	$250,000	I
2007	The Tin Man	9	Victor Espinoza	Richard Mandella	Aury & Ralph E. Todd	1:34.34	$300,000	I
Shoemaker Breeders' Cup Mile Stakes
2006	Aragorn	4	Corey Nakatani	Neil Drysdale	Ballygallon Stud	1:32.95	$300,000	I
2005	Castledale (IRE)	4	René Douglas	Jeff Mullins	Frank Lyons & Greg Knee	1:33.17	$350,000	I
2004	Designed for Luck	7	Patrick Valenzuela	Vladimir Cerin	David & Holly Wilson	1:32.81	$350,000	I
2003	Redattore (BRZ)	8	Alex Solis	Richard Mandella	Luis Alfredo Taunay	1:33.20	$350,000	I
2002	Ladies Din	7	Patrick Valenzuela	Julio Canani	J. Terrence Lanni & Bernard C. Schiappa	1:33.20	$500,000	I
2001	Irish Prize	5	Gary Stevens	Neil Drysdale	Maktoum al Maktoum	1:33.60	$350,000	I
2000	Silic (FR)	5	Corey Nakatani	Julio Canani	J. Terrence Lanni, Ken Poslosky & Bernard C. Schiappa	1:33.20	$350,000	I
1999	Silic (FR)	4	Corey Nakatani	Julio Canani	J. Terrence Lanni, Ken Poslosky & Bernard C. Schiappa	1:32.80	$350,000	II
1998	Labeeb	6	Kent Desormeaux	Neil Drysdale	Maktoum al Maktoum	1:33.20	$400,000	II
1997	Pinfloron (FR)	5	David Flores	Walter Greenman	Cobra Farm	1:34.40	$400,000	II
1996	Fastness (IRE)	6	Corey Nakatani	Jenine Sahadi	Evergreen Farm	1:32.60	$700,000	II
Shoemaker Handicap
1995	Unfinished Symph	4	Chris Antley	Wesley Ward	Hatcher & Rice & Seawind St	1:33.00	$150,000	II
1994	Megan's Interco	5	Corey Black	Jenine Sahadi	Milton M. Bronson	1:32.60	$100,000	II
1993	Journalism	5	Alex Solis	Wallace Dollase	Richard J. Stephen	1:32.80	$100,000	II
1992	Race not run							
1991	Exbourne	5	Gary Stevens	Robert J. Frankel	Juddmonte Farms	1:33.40	$100,000	II
1990	Shining Steel	4	Chris McCarron	Charles E. Whittingham	Gretzky & Summa Stable	1:34.00	$100,000	II
Premier Handicap

=== Other earlier winners ===
- 1968 – Kissin' George
- 1953 – Pet Bully
