= Del Mar Derby =

- Class: Grade II
- Location: Del Mar Racetrack; Del Mar, California, United States
- Inaugurated: 1945
- Race type: Thoroughbred – Flat racing
- Website: www.dmtc.com

Race information
- Distance: 1 1/8 miles (9 furlongs)
- Surface: Turf
- Track: Left-handed
- Qualification: Three-year-olds
- Weight: Assigned
- Purse: $250,000 (2021)

The Caesars Sportsbook Del Mar Derby is an American thoroughbred horse race run annually during the first week of September at Del Mar Racetrack in Del Mar, California. A Grade II race open to three-year-old horses, it is contested on turf over a distance of one and one-eighth miles (9 furlongs).

Inaugurated in 1945 as the Quigley Memorial Handicap at a distance of 1 1/16 miles on dirt, it was renamed in 1948, modified to its present distance in 1950, and moved to turf in 1970. It was raced in two divisions in 1963, in 1970, and again in 2013. In 2013, 24 sophomores passed the entry box so the race had to be split into two divisions.

In 1968 there was a dead heat for the win.

In 2021, the race was presented for the first time by Caesars Sportsbook.

== Records ==
Speed record: (on turf at 1 1/8 miles)

- 1:45.85 – Willow O Wisp (2005)

Most wins by an owner:

- 3 – Howard B. Keck (1960, 1962, 1966)
- 3 – (Glen Hill Farm) (1973, 1979, 2011)

Most wins by a jockey:

- 5 – Laffit Pincay Jr. (1979, 1980, 1982, 1990, 1994)
- 5 – Eddie Delahoussaye (1984, 1986, 1987, 1992, 2000)

Most wins by a trainer:

- 4 – Julio C. Canani (1988, 1998, 1999, 2004)

== Winners ==
Year	Winner	Jockey	Trainer	Owner	Time
2026	Proletariat	Kyle Frey	Jeff Mullins	Dutch Girl Holdings and Irving Ventures	1:47.66
2025	The Padre	Umberto Rispoli	Philip D'Amato	Little Red Feather Racing, Sterling Stables, LLC and Naify, Marsha	1:49.23
2024	Formidable Man	Umberto Rispoli	Michael W. McCarthy	Warren, Jr., William K. and Warren, Suzanne	1:49.87
2023	Conclude	Hector Isaac Berrios	Philip D'Amato	Little Red Feather Racing, Madaket Stables LLC and Jones, Brereton C	1:48.61
2022	Slow Down Andy	Mario Gutierrez	Doug O'Neill	Reddam Racing	1:48.27
2021	None Above the Law	Joe Bravo	Peter Miller	Downstream Racing, LLC	1:48.97
2020	Pixelate	Umberto Rispoli	Michael Stidham	Godolphin Racing	1:50.25
2019	Nolde	Victor Espinoza	John Shirreffs	Jerry Moss	1:46.98
2018	Ride a Comet	Drayden Van Dyke	Mark Casse	Oxley, John C. and My Meadowview Farm LLC	1:48.11
2017	Sharp Samurai	Gary Stevens	Mark Glatt	Red Barron's Barn, Mark Glatt, et al.	1:48.03
2016	Free Rose	Norberto Arroyo Jr.	Richard Baltas	Abbondanza Racing/McCauley	1:47.70
2015	Om	Gary Stevens	Dan L. Hendricks	Sareen Family Trust	1:47.79
2014	Midnight Storm	Tyler Baze	Philip D'Amato	Dye and Venneri Racing	1:47.47
2013	Gabriel Storm (1st div.)	Mike E. Smith	Jeff Mullins	Sam Britt & Michael House	1:46.94
2013	Ethnic Dance (2nd div.)	Edwin Maldonado	John W. Sadler	Craig Stables	1:48.24
2012	My Best Brother	Martin Garcia	Julio C. Canani	Currin/Eisman	1:46.83
2011	Banned	Garrett Gomez	Tom Proctor	Glen Hill Farm	1:47.93
2010	Twirling Candy	Joel Rosario	John W. Sadler	Craig Family Trust	1:46.96
2009	Rendezvous	Joel Rosario	Jerry Hollendorfer	Hollendorfer/G. Todaro et al.	1:46.88
2008	Madeo	Mike E. Smith	John Shirreffs	Ann & Jerry Moss	1:46.68
2007	Medici Code	Martin Pedroza	Darrell Vienna	Herrick Racing	1:47.10
2006	Get Funky	Jose Valdivia Jr.	John W. Sadler	Keith Abrahams	1:46.39
2005	Willow O Wisp	Garrett Gomez	Vladimir Cerin	Robert A. Alexander	1:45.85
2004	Blackdoun	Corey Nakatani	Julio C. Canani	Naify & Woodside Farms	1:46.75
2003	Fairly Ransom	Alex Solis	Ron McAnally	Arnold Zetcher	1:46.45
2002	Insperado	Corey Nakatani	Robert J. Frankel	3 Plus U Stable	1:47.49
2001	Romanceishope	Chris McCarron	Jenine Sahadi	S. Hatake & S. Nishimura	1:47.93
2000	Walkslikeaduck	Eddie Delahoussaye	Patrick Gallagher	D. Bienstock/C. Winner et al.	1:46.66
1999	Val Royal	Corey Nakatani	Julio C. Canani	David Milch	1:48.40
1998	Ladies Din	Kent Desormeaux	Julio C. Canani	Lanni-Schiappa-Sloan	1:48.40
1997	Anet	Gary Stevens	Bob Baffert	Donald Dizney	1:48.40
1996	Rainbow Blues	Corey Nakatani	Charles Whittingham	Frankfurt Stable	1:50.00
1995	Da Hoss	René Douglas	Michael W. Dickinson	Prestonwood Farm et al.	1:48.00
1994	Ocean Crest	Laffit Pincay Jr.	Frank L. Brothers	Lazy Lane Farms Inc.	1:48.60
1993	Guide	Kent Desormeaux	Robert B. Hess Jr.	Jeremys Stable et al.	1:49.60
1992	Daros	Eddie Delahoussaye	Michael Puhich	Al & Sandee Kirkwood	1:48.80
1991	Eternity Star	Frank Alvarado	Robert J. Frankel	Peter Wall	1:49.20
1990	Tight Spot †	Laffit Pincay Jr.	Ron McAnally	Anderson, VHW St., et al.	1:49.60
1989	Hawkster	Pat Valenzuela	Ron McAnally	J. Shelton Meredith	1:48.00
1988	Silver Circus	Russell Baze	Julio C. Canani	Joseph M. Scardino	1:49.00
1987	Deputy Governor	Eddie Delahoussaye	Neil D. Drysdale	Universal Stable	1:48.40
1986	Vernon Castle	Eddie Delahoussaye	John Sullivan	Allen E. Paulson (Lessee)	1:48.40
1985	First Norman	Gary Stevens	Albert Barrera	Laz Barrera/Norman Silverman	1:48.00
1984	Tsunami Slew	Eddie Delahoussaye	Edwin J. Gregson	Royal Lines (Lessee)	1:48.00
1983	Tanks Brigade	Rafael Meza	Joe Manzi	Lee, Manzi & Ozer	1:49.00
1982	Give Me Strength	Laffit Pincay Jr.	Luis Barrera	Happy Valley Farm	1:49.00
1981	Juan Barrera	Fernando Toro	Greg Gilchrist	Harris Farms, Inc.	1:49.00
1980	Exploded	Laffit Pincay Jr.	Charles Whittingham	M.J. Bradley/Whittingham/Wynne	1:49.60
1979	Relaunch	Laffit Pincay Jr.	John H. Adams	Glen Hill Farm	1:48.80
1978	Misrepresentation	Donald Pierce	Gordon C. Campbell	Bernard J. Ridder	1:49.60
1977	Text	Darrel McHargue	Vincent Clyne	Elmendorf	1:49.40
1976	Montespan	Darrel McHargue	John H. Adams	El Peco Ranch	1:48.40
1975	Larrikin	Donald Pierce	Farrell W. Jones	Joseph Morjoseph	1:48.80
1974	Lightning Mandate	Álvaro Pineda	Farrell W. Jones	Jones, McLeod & Mabee, et al.	1:50.00
1973	Right Honorable	Jerry Lambert	Willard L. Proctor	Glen Hill Farm	1:49.20
1972	Bicker	Glen Brogan	Robert E. Wingfield	Green Thumb Farm Stable	1:49.00
1971	Regal Case	Howard Grant	Robert L. Wheeler	Flag Is Up Farm	1:49.00
1970	War Heim	Fernando Toro	Dale Landers	Hazel E. Huffman	1:49.20
1970	Mayhedo	Jerry Lambert	Jay Saladin	Edward C. Flynn	1:49.20
1969	Orbit Ruler	Fernando Alvarez	Robert K. Mitchell	SBL Stable	1:47.40
1968	Prince Hemp	Jerry Lambert	Lydell T. Ruff	Herbert L. Pratt	1:46.60
1968	Glory Hallelujah	Raul Caballero	Wally Dunn	Flying M. Stable	1:46.60
1967	Charlie Boots	Álvaro Pineda	Willie H. Wyndle	Mrs. Harry Hart	1:47.40
1966	Drin	Donald Pierce	Charles Whittingham	Howard B. Keck	1:47.40
1965	Hasty Trip	Bobby Jennings	Richard Chew	M/M/ R. L. Cooper	1:47.60
1964	Pop's Harmony	George Taniguchi	Buddy Leavitt	Shapiro & Leavitt	1:48.60
1963	Big Raff	Rudy Campas	John H. Adams	Ralph Lowe	1:48.00
1963	Olympiad King	Johnny Longden	Jack M. Phillips	Connie M. Ring	1:47.80
1962	Bayou Bourg	Pete Moreno	Joseph S. Dunn	Howard B. Keck	1:48.20
1961	Speak John	Pete Moreno	Farrell W. Jones	Elmendorf	1:48.00
1960	Nagea	Alex Maese	Joseph S. Dunn	Howard B. Keck	1:47.60
1959	Mr. Eiffel	George Taniguchi	Dale Landers	Verne Winchell	1:47.60
1958	The Shoe	Alex Maese	Mesh Tenney	Rex C. Ellsworth	1:48.60
1957	Mystic Eye	William Skuse	T. Scholfield	O Enterprises	1:48.20
1956	Bounty Bay	John R. Adams	William J. Hirsch	Raoul Walsh	1:48.00
1955	Hi Pardner	Willie Harmatz	Wally Dunn	Joe W. Brown	1:49.00
1954	Musselshell	Bill Shoemaker	Jim Sinnott	Jim Sinnott	1:48.80
1953	Apple Valley	Bill Pearson	Red McDaniel	Mrs. A. W. Ryan	1:49.40
1952	Southarlington	Robert Summers	J. Thomas Taylor	J. Ross Clark III	1:48.80
1951	Grantor	Bill Shoemaker	Harry L. Daniels	William Goetz	1:48.60
1950	Great Circle	Ralph Neves	Warren Stute	Yolo Stable	1:48.40
1949	Bolero	Jack Westrope	Frank E. Childs	Abraham Hirschberg	1:42.00
1948	Frankly	Gene Pederson	Buster Millerick	Frank Frankel	1:42.80
1947	Wheatfield	Melvin Peterson	Ross Brinson	Zack T. Addington	1:43.80
1946	Terry Bargello	William Swigart	Bob R. Roberts	Ranchita Alvera	1:44.40
1945	Timber Slide	Scotty Craigmyle	W. Robertson	Mill B Stable	1:48.80

* † In 1990, Tight Spot finished first, but was disqualified and set back to tenth place. That ruling was contested and later was overturned by the California Horse Racing Board and his victory reinstated.
