= Twilight Derby =

- Class: Grade II
- Location: Santa Anita Park; Arcadia, California, United States
- Inaugurated: 1969 (as Volante Handicap)
- Race type: Thoroughbred – Flat racing
- Website: Santa Anita Park

Race information
- Distance: 1 1/8 miles (9 furlongs)
- Surface: Turf
- Track: Left-handed
- Qualification: Three-year-olds
- Weight: 124 lbs.
- Purse: $200,000 (since 2024)

The Twilight Derby is a Grade II American Thoroughbred horse race for three years olds over the distance of one-and-one-eighth miles on the turf scheduled annually in late October at Santa Anita Park in Arcadia, California. The event currently carries a purse of $200,000.

== History ==
The event was inaugurated on 18 October 1969 as the Volante Handicap at the Oak Tree Racing Association meeting at Santa Anita Park and was won by the Mrs. Howard B. Keck's entry Tell who was ridden by US Hall of Fame jockey Bill Shoemaker carrying the imposing weight of 130 pounds by 3/4 of a length over Noholme Jr. in a time of 1:46 4/5. The event was named for Elias Jackson "Lucky" Baldwin's 1885 American Derby winner, Volante, who was ridden to victory by jockey Isaac Burns Murphy. Lucky Baldwin had built the original Santa Anita Racetrack Track in 1907 and Volante was buried at the track.

When the grading of races began as a Thoroughbred Owners and Breeders Association project in 1973 the event was classified as Grade III, however, the event was not held that year due to a strike by pari-mutual clerks.

In 1988 and 1989 the event was upgraded to Grade II before returning to Grade III. In 1996 the event was once again upgraded to Grade II.

In 1997 the event was renamed to the Oak Tree Derby after the Oak Tree Racing Association. In 2012 with the Oak Tree Racing Association abandoning the Santa Anita Track the event was renamed to the Twilight Derby.

The event has been held on the undercard of the Saturday Breeders' Cup card in 2008, 2009, 2016, 2019 and 2023.

== Records ==
Time record:

- 1:44.48 – The Usual Q.T. (2009)

Margins:

- 4 1/4 lengths - Daytona (IRE) (2007)

Most wins by an owner:

- 2 – Charles E. Whittingham (1977, 1979)

Most wins by a jockey:

- 6 – Gary Stevens (1986, 1990, 1998, 1999, 2015, 2017)

Most wins by a trainer:

- 5 – Charles E. Whittingham (1969, 1974, 1977, 1979, 1989)

== Winners ==
Year	Winner	Jockey	Trainer	Owner	Distance	Time	Purse	Grade	Ref
At Santa Anita Park – Twilight Derby
2026	Unrivaled Time	Joel Rosario	Leonard Powell	Innergy Racing Corp and Alfred Pais	1 1/8 miles	1:47.27	$200,000	II	
2025	Test Score	Juan J. Hernandez	H. Graham Motion	Amerman Racing	1 1/8 miles	1:47.66	$200,000	II	
2024	Atitlan	Hector Berrios	John A. Shirreffs	John M. B. O'Connor	1 1/8 miles	1:49.12	$201,000	II	
2023	Seal Team (GB)	Umberto Rispoli	Richard E. Mandella	Perry R. & Ramona S. Bass	1 1/8 miles	1:47.29	$254,000	II	
2022	Cabo Spirit	Joe Bravo	George Papaprodromou	Kretz Racing	1 1/8 miles	1:49.46	$201,500	II	
2021	Subconscious	Juan Hernandez	Richard E. Mandella	LNJ Foxwoods	1 1/8 miles	1:47.00	$202,500	II	
2020	Smooth Like Strait	Umberto Rispoli	Michael W. McCarthy	Cannon Thoroughbreds	1 1/8 miles	1:46.89	$202,000	II	
2019	Mo Forza	Joel Rosario	Peter L. Miller	Bardy Farm & OG Boss	1 1/8 miles	1:46.18	$202,106	II	
2018	River Boyne (IRE)	Flavien Prat	Jeff Mullins	Red Baron's Barn & Rancho Temescal	1 1/8 miles	1:45.36	$201,380	II	
2017	Sharp Samurai	Gary L. Stevens	Mark Glatt	Mark Glatt, Red Barron's Barn & Rancho Temescal	1 1/8 miles	1:45.36	$201,380	II	
2016	Frank Conversation	Mario Gutierrez	Doug F. O'Neill	Reddam Racing	1 1/8 miles	1:46.81	$201,725	II	
2015	Om	Gary L. Stevens	Dan L. Hendricks	Sareen Family Trust	1 1/8 miles	1:45.90	$200,750	II	
2014	Long On Value	Rosie Napravnik	William I. Mott	Watchtel Stables & George J. Kerr	1 1/8 miles	1:46.82	$201,500	II	
2013	Rookie Sensation	Victor Espinoza	John Shirreffs	Stronach Stables	1 1/8 miles	1:46.54	$152,000	II	
2012	Grandeur (IRE)	William T. Buick	Jeremy Noseda	Yvonne Jacques	1 1/8 miles	1:46.78	$150,000	II	
Oak Tree Derby
2011	Ultimate Eagle	Martin A. Pedroza	Michael Pender	B. J. Wright	1 1/8 miles	1:47.03	$150,000	II	
At Hollywood Park
2010	Fantastic Pick (GB)	Corey Nakatani	James Lloyd	Jim Ford, Robert Maycock & Ken Smole	1 1/8 miles	1:48.51	$150,000	II	
At Santa Anita Park
2009	The Usual Q. T.	Victor Espinoza	James M. Cassidy	Don Van Racing, Michael Nentwig, George Saadeh, Thomas H. Braden	1 1/8 miles	1:44.48	$150,000	II	
2008	Muny	David R. Flores	Mike Puype	Robert Bone, Don Johnson, Richard S. Trontz, Brewer Racing Stable & Robinson	1 1/8 miles	1:47.69	$150,000	II	
2007	Daytona (IRE)	Mike E. Smith	Dan L. Hendricks	Jeff Davenport, Tom Lenner, Jess Ravich & Thomas W. Murray	1 1/8 miles	1:46.40	$150,000	II	
2006	Dark Islander (IRE)	Jose Valdivia Jr.	John W. Hills	Donald M. Kerr	1 1/8 miles	1:46.21	$150,000	II	
2005	Aragorn (IRE)	Pat Valenzuela	Neil D. Drysdale	Ballygallon Stud	1 1/8 miles	1:46.48	$150,000	II	
2004	Greek Sun	Edgar S. Prado	Robert J. Frankel	Peter G. Angelos	1 1/8 miles	1:48.08	$150,000	II	
2003	Devious Boy (GB)	Julie Krone	Kathy Walsh	James R. Vreeland	1 1/8 miles	1:48.92	$150,000	II	
2002	Johar	Alex O. Solis	Richard E. Mandella	The Thoroughbred Corporation	1 1/8 miles	1:46.00	$150,000	II	
2001	No Slip (FR)	Kent J. Desormeaux	Robert J. Frankel	Amerman Racing Stables	1 1/8 miles	1:46.56	$150,000	II	
2000	Sign of Hope (GB)	Alex O. Solis	Neil D. Drysdale	Relatively Stable	1 1/8 miles	1:47.71	$250,000	II	
1999	Mula Gula	Gary L. Stevens	Jerry Hollendorfer	Steven J. Gula	1 1/8 miles	1:46.67	$250,000	II	
1998	Ladies Din	Gary L. Stevens	Julio C. Canani	J. Terrence Lanni, Bernard Schiappa & Mike Sloan	1 1/8 miles	1:50.24	$250,000	II	
1997	Lasting Approval	Alex O. Solis	Diane L. Perkins	Wimborne Farm	1 1/8 miles	1:50.84	$250,000	II	
Volante Handicap
1996	Odyle	Chris McCarron	J. Paco Gonzalez	Ron Brimacombe, Trudy McCaffery & John Toffan	1 1/8 miles	1:46.83	$130,250	II	
1995	Helmsman	Chris McCarron	Wallace Dollase	Horizon Stable, Jarvis & Taber, et al.	1 1/8 miles	1:48.98	$131,900	III	
1994	Run Softly	Laffit Pincay Jr.	Robert J. Frankel	Juddmonte Farms	1 1/8 miles	1:49.96	$109,800	III	
1993	Eastern Memories (IRE)	Jerry D. Bailey	Mark A. Hennig	Team Valor, Amerman & Stibor	1 1/8 miles	1:48.00	$111,800	III	
1992	Blacksburg	Alex O. Solis	D. Wayne Lukas	Overbrook Farm	1 1/8 miles	1:48.00	$112,700	III	
1991	General Meeting	Kent J. Desormeaux	David E. Hofmans	Golden Eagle Farm	1 1/8 miles	1:46.78	$114,500	III	
1990	In Excess (IRE)	Gary L. Stevens	Bruce L. Jackson	Jack J. Munari	1 1/8 miles	1:46.60	$110,300	III	
1989	Seven Rivers	Robbie Davis	Charles E. Whittingham	Enemy Stable & Mandysland Farm	1 1/8 miles	1:45.80	$111,100	II	
1988	Coax Me Clyde	Pat Valenzuela	Barry Knight	Vistas Stables	1 1/8 miles	1:48.40	$135,000	II	
1987	The Medic	Sandy Hawley	Gary F. Jones	Dr. Edward Giammarino	1 1/8 miles	1:47.80	$84,050	III	
1986	Air Display	Gary L. Stevens	Darrell Vienna	Apple, Forgnone, Levy, et al.	1 1/8 miles	1:48.00	$107,450	III	
1985	Justoneoftheboys	Alex O. Solis	Ron McAnally	Morris Cohen & Dion Recachina	1 1/8 miles	1:47.60	$110,000	III	
1984	Tights	Chris McCarron	Laz Barrera	Mill House Stable	1 1/8 miles	1:46.60	$110,500	III	
1983	Mamaison	Chris McCarron	Richard E. Mandella	Sam Bretzfield & Hal Oliver	1 1/8 miles	1:49.80	$108,900	III	
1982	Lamerok	Laffit Pincay Jr.	LeRoy Jolley	Peter M. Brant	1 1/8 miles	1:46.20	$111,300	III	
1981	Seafood	Marco Castaneda	Ron McAnally	Elmendorf Farm	1 1/8 miles	1:49.00	$85,450	III	Dead heat
1981	Waterway Drive	Jerry D. Bailey	Robin Frank	Eric Frank	1 1/8 miles	1:49.00	$85,450	III	Dead heat
1980	Pocketful in Vail	Fernando Toro	Jerry M. Fanning	Kahn, Morcus & Rosburg	1 1/8 miles	1:47.80	$66,400	III	
1979	Hyannis Port	Bill Shoemaker	Charles E. Whittingham	Bell Bloodstock & Charles E. Whittingham	1 1/8 miles	1:47.60	$54,800	III	
1978	Wayside Station	Laffit Pincay Jr.	John H. Adams	El Peco Ranch	1 1/8 miles	1:47.80	$57,100	III	
1977	Kulak	Bill Shoemaker	Charles E. Whittingham	Mary Jones Bradley, Charles E. Whittingham & Buck Wynne Jr.	1 1/8 miles	1:46.80	$33,300	III	
1976	Today 'n Tomorrow	Laffit Pincay Jr.	Roger E. Clapp	Connie M. Ring	1 1/8 miles	1:46.80	$32,950	III	
1975	§ Messenger of Song	Jerry Lambert	Gordon C. Campbell	Bernard J. Ridder	1 1/8 miles	1:46.80	$43,450	III	
1974	Within Hail	Bill Shoemaker	Charles E. Whittingham	Bwamazon Farm	1 1/8 miles	1:48.40	$45,250	III	
1973	‡ Race not held								
1972	Bicker	Glen Brogan	Robert Wingfield	Green Thumb Farm Stable	1 1/8 miles	1:48.20	$33,150		
1971	Vegas Vic	Howard Grant	Randy Sechrest	Betty Sechrest & Charles Fritz	1 1/8 miles	1:48.20	$33,550		
1970	Mickey McGuire	Bill Shoemaker	Paul K. Parker	Vanguard Stable (Suzanne Reagan) & Anita Madden	1 1/8 miles	1:47.40	$25,450		
1969	§ Tell	Bill Shoemaker	Charles E. Whittingham	Elizabeth A. Keck	1 1/8 miles	1:46.80	$57,500		

Legend:
Turf
Notes:
§ Ran as an entry
‡ In 1973 the Volante Handicap was scheduled to be held on Saturday, 7 October 1973, opening day of the Oak Tree Racing Association's meeting at Santa Anita but was cancelled due to a three-day strike by the pari-mutuel clerks.

== See also ==
List of American and Canadian Graded races
