= Leandros =

Leandros is a Greek surname. Notable people with the surname include:

- Leo Leandros (1923–2025), Greek musician, composer, and producer
- Vicky Leandros (born 1949), Greek singer

This name means "lion man" in Greek. "leon" means lion, and "andros," a variation of the modern Greek "andras," means man.
