= City of Hope Mile Stakes =

Horse race in Arcadia, California, US

- Class: Grade II
- Location: Santa Anita Park; Arcadia, California, United States
- Inaugurated: 1986 (as Colonel F. W. Koester Handicap)
- Race type: Thoroughbred – Flat racing
- Website: Santa Anita Park

Race information
- Distance: 1 mile
- Surface: Turf
- Track: Left-handed
- Qualification: Three-year-olds and older
- Weight: Base weights with allowances: 4-year-olds and up: 126 lbs. 3-year-olds: 122 lbs.
- Purse: $200,000 (since 2018)

The City of Hope Mile Stakes is a Grade II American Thoroughbred horse race for horses aged three years old or older over the distance of one mile on the turf scheduled annually in September at Santa Anita Park in Arcadia, California. The event currently carries a purse of $200,000.

== History ==
The event was inaugurated on 4 October 1986 as the Colonel F. W. Koester Handicap at the Oak Tree Racing Association meeting at Santa Anita Park as the eighth race on the racecard and was won by the US Hall of Fame, Charles E. Whittingham trained Palace Music who broke the track record for the distance that was set by Pettrax in 20 April 1986. Palace Music in his next start would just fail winning the Breeders' Cup Mile finishing a head second to Last Tycoon. Colonel F. W. Koester was part of 1932 US Equestrian team, later was the General Manager of the California Thoroughbred Breeders Association from 1955 to 1969 and was elected into the California Racing Hall of Fame in 1988.

In 1989 the event was classified by the American Graded Stakes Committee as Grade III and was upgraded to Grade II status the following year.

In 1996 the event was renamed to the Oak Tree Mile Handicap and at the same time was downgraded to Grade III. Between 1996 and 2006 the event had Breeders' Cup incentives which reflected in the name of the event. In 2003 the event was upgraded back to Grade II.

In 2013 the name of the event was changed to the City of Hope Stakes in honor of the cancer treatment center in Los Angeles.

In 2017 the event was run as a Black Type event with a much lower purse as the Obviously Mile Stakes. The Irish bred Obviously won this event in 2012 when it was run as the Arroyo Seco Stakes and was fourth in 2013 and was third in 2016.

== Records ==
Time record:

- 1:31.84 – No Jet Lag (2013)

Margins:

- 4 lengths - Double Feint (1987), Urgent Request (IRE) (1996)

Most wins:

- 2 – Mo Forza (2020, 2021)
- 2 – Johannes (2024, 2025)

Most wins by an owner:

- 2 – Bardy Farm & OG Boss (2020, 2021)

Most wins by a jockey:

- 4 – Gary Stevens (1986, 1988, 2000, 2018)

Most wins by a trainer:

- 6 – Neil D. Drysdale (1989, 1998, 2000, 2004, 2006, 2010)

== Winners ==
Year	Winner	Age	Jockey	Trainer	Owner	Distance	Time	Purse	Grade	Ref
At Santa Anita Park – City of Hope Mile Stakes
2026	Cabo Spirit	7	Mike E. Smith	George Papaprodromou	Kretz Racing	1 mile	1:33.06	$200,000	II	
2025	Johannes	5	Umberto Rispoli	Tim Yakteen	Cuyathy	1 mile	1:34.13	$200,500	II	
2024	Johannes	4	Umberto Rispoli	Tim Yakteen	Cuyathy	1 mile	1:32.45	$201,500	II	
2023	Hong Kong Harry (IRE)	6	Juan J. Hernandez	Phillip D'Amato	Scott Anastasi, Jimmy Ukegawa & Tony Valazza	1 mile	1:33.77	$202,000	II	
2022	Beyond Brilliant	4	Victor Espinoza	John Shirreffs	C R K Stable	1 mile	1:32.61	$200,500	II	
2021	Mo Forza	5	Flavien Prat	Peter L. Miller	Bardy Farm & OG Boss	1 mile	1:32.45	$200,000	II	
2020	Mo Forza	4	Flavien Prat	Peter L. Miller	Bardy Farm & OG Boss	1 mile	1:32.09	$201,000	II	
2019	True Valour (IRE)	5	Drayden Van Dyke	Simon Callaghan	Qatar Racing Limited	1 mile	1:32.82	$202,106	II	
2018	Sharp Samurai	4	Gary L. Stevens	Mark Glatt	Red Baron's Barn, Rancho Temescal & Mark Glatt	1 mile	1:32.47	$201,380	II	
Obviously Mile Stakes
2017	Blackjackcat	4	Kent J. Desormeaux	Mark Glatt	Al & Saundra Kirkwood	1 mile	1:33.70	$79,695		
City of Hope Mile Stakes
2016	Vyjack	6	Flavien Prat	Philip D'Amato	Pick Six Racing	1 mile	1:31.69	$201,725	II	
2015	Alert Bay	4	Martin Garcia	Blaine D. Wright	Peter Redekop B. C.	1 mile	1:33.58	$200,750	II	
2014	Big Bane Theory	5	Joseph Talamo	Carla Gaines	Scott Gross & Mark Devereaux	1 mile	1:32.38	$201,500	II	
2013	No Jet Lag	3	Mike E. Smith	Simon Callaghan	Anthony Ramsden	1 mile	1:31.84	$150,750	II	
Arroyo Seco Mile Stakes
2012	Obviously (IRE)	4	Joseph Talamo	Mike R. Mitchell	Anthony Fanticola & Joseph Scardino	1 mile	1:31.95	$150,000	II	
Oak Tree Mile Stakes
2011	Jeranimo	5	Martin Garcia	Michael Pender	Robert J. Wright	1 mile	1:32.61	$150,000	II	
At Hollywood Park – Oak Tree Mile Stakes
2010	Liberian Freighter	5	Martin Garcia	Neil D. Drysdale	Shawn L. Dugan, King Edward Racing Stable & Charles N. Winner	1 mile	1:33.24	$150,000	II	
At Santa Anita Park – Oak Tree Mile Stakes
2009	Cowboy Cal	4	Garrett K. Gomez	Todd A. Pletcher	Robert C. & Janice McNair	1 mile	1:33.12	$150,000	II	
2008	Hyperbaric	5	Garrett K. Gomez	Julio C. Canani	Prestonwood Farm	1 mile	1:33.62	$200,000	II	
2007	Out of Control (BRZ)	4	Michael C. Baze	Robert J. Frankel	T N T Stud	1 mile	1:34.16	$252,000	II	
2006	Aragorn (IRE)	4	Corey Nakatani	Neil D. Drysdale	Ballygallon Stud	1 mile	1:32.87	$249,000	II	
2005	Singletary	5	David R. Flores	Don Chatlos	Little Red Feather Racing	1 mile	1:34.54	$249,000	II	
2004	Musical Chimes	4	Kent J. Desormeaux	Neil D. Drysdale	Sheik Mohammed bin Rashid Al Maktoum	1 mile	1:33.29	$246,000	II	
2003	Designed for Luck	6	Pat Valenzuela	Vladimir Cerin	David & Holly Wilson	1 mile	1:32.61	$300,000	II	
2002	Night Patrol	6	Jose Valdivia Jr.	Nick Canani	Everest Stables	1 mile	1:32.93	$234,000	II	
2001	Val Royal (FR)	5	Jose Valdivia Jr.	Julio C. Canani	David S. Milch	1 mile	1:33.21	$219,000	II	
2000	War Chant	3	Gary L. Stevens	Neil D. Drysdale	Irving & Marjorie Cowan	1 mile	1:33.75	$249,000	II	
1999	Silic (FR)	4	Corey Nakatani	Julio C. Canani	Terrence Lanni, Ken Poslosky, Bernard C. Schiappa, et al	1 mile	1:33.76	$200,000	III	
Oak Tree Mile Handicap
1998	Hawksley Hill (IRE)	5	Alex O. Solis	Neil D. Drysdale	David & Jill Heerensperger	1 mile	1:36.72	$274,000	III	
1997	Fantastic Fellow	3	Alex O. Solis	D. Wayne Lukas	The Thoroughbred Corporation	1 mile	1:36.23	$200,000	III	
1996	Urgent Request (IRE)	6	Chris McCarron	Charles E. Whittingham	Stewart Aitken	1 mile	1:32.44	$180,300	III	
Colonel F. W. Koester Handicap
1995	Ventiquattrofogli (IRE)	5	Goncalino Almeida	Wallace Dollase	Bonilla, Carr & Horizon Stable	1 mile	1:35.30	$133,100	II	
1994	Bon Point (GB)	4	Eddie Delahoussaye	Robert J. Frankel	Juddmonte Farms	1 mile	1:33.86	$107,050	II	
1993	Johann Quatz (FR)	4	Eddie Delahoussaye	Ron McAnally	Tadahiro Hotehama	1 mile	1:36.28	$107,350	II	
1992	Twilight Agenda	6	Chris McCarron	D. Wayne Lukas	Moyglare Stud	1 mile	1:33.36	$110,300	II	
1991	Ibero (ARG)	4	Alex O. Solis	Ron McAnally	Ivan Pavlovsky & Frank Whitham	1 mile	1:33.77	$112,000	II	
1990	Notorious Pleasure	4	Laffit Pincay Jr.	Hector O. Palma	Robert, Karen, Marc, Michael & Richard Levy	1 mile	1:33.00	$113,700	II	
1989	Political Ambition	5	Eddie Delahoussaye	Neil D. Drysdale	Clover Racing Stable (lessee), Kinkade, Wolfe, et al	1 mile	1:33.40	$112,800	III	
1988	Mohamed Abdu (IRE)	4	Gary L. Stevens	Richard W. Mulhall	Meyer & Molly Gaskin Trust – Markovic	1 mile	1:34.40	$110,550		
1987	Double Feint	4	Fernando Toro	LeRoy Jolley	Peter M. Brant	1 mile	1:37.00	$107,200		
1986	Palace Music	5	Gary L. Stevens	Charles E. Whittingham	Nelson Bunker Hunt & Allen E. Paulson	1 mile	1:35.00	$82,300		

Legend:
Turf

== See also ==
- List of American and Canadian Graded races
