= Eddie Read Stakes =

- Class: Grade II
- Location: Del Mar Racetrack; Del Mar, California, United States
- Inaugurated: 1974 (as Eddie Read Handicap)
- Race type: Thoroughbred - Flat racing
- Website: Del Mar

Race information
- Distance: 1 1/8 miles
- Surface: Turf
- Track: Left-handed
- Qualification: Three-year-olds and older
- Weight: Base weights with allowances: 4-year-olds and up: 125 lbs. 3-year-olds: 120 lbs.
- Purse: $250,000 (2021)

The Eddie Read Stakes is a Grade II American Thoroughbred horse race for three-year-olds and older over a distance of one and one-eighth miles on the turf course scheduled annually in late July or early August at Del Mar Racetrack in Del Mar, California. The event currently carries a purse of $250,000.

== History ==
The inaugural running of the event was on 25 August 1974 as the Eddie Read Handicap with Elmendorf Farm's My Old Friend winning as the 9-1 longshot winning by 3/4 length in a time of 1:49 1/5. The event was named in honor of William E. (Eddie) Read who served as the publicity directory at Del Mar and died 28 May 1973.

In 1980 the event was upgrade by the Thoroughbred Owners and Breeders Association to Grade III. Two years later the event upgraded once more to Grade II. With the stake money increasing yearly and the quality of the entrants running the race performing well in high level events the event was upgraded to the highest classification of Grade I in 1988.

In the Breeders' Cup era the event became a logical preparatory race for both the Breeders' Cup Mile and Breeders' Cup Turf. The 1993 winner of the event, the French-bred Kotashaan, went on to win the Breeders' Cup Turf and later was voted to win US Champion Male Turf Horse and US Horse of the Year honors.

In 2006 the Irish-bred Aragorn set a new stakes and track record of 1:44.79 winning by four lengths as a 3-2 favorite.

In 2009 the conditions of the event were changed from handicap to stakes allowance and the name of the event was modified to the Eddie Read Stakes.

In 2016 the event was downgraded to Grade II.

== Records ==
Speed record:

- 1:44.79 - Aragorn (2006) (new race and course record)

Margins:

- 5 lengths - Special Ring (2003)

Most wins:

- 2 - United (2020, 2021)
- 2 - Wickerr (1981, 1982)
- 2 - Fastness (1995, 1996)
- 2 - Special Ring (2003, 2004)
- 2 - Acclamation (2011, 2012)
- 2 - Gold Phoenix (IRE) (2023, 2026)

Most wins by an owner:

- 3 - Edmund A. Gann (1981, 1982, 1986)

Most wins by a jockey:

- 5 - Corey Nakatani (1994, 1996, 2002, 2006, 2009)

Most wins by a trainer:

- 7 - Robert J. Frankel (1977, 1981, 1982, 1986, 1989, 1992, 1997)

== Winners ==
Year	Winner	Age	Jockey	Trainer	Owner	Distance	Time	Purse	Grade	Ref
Eddie Read Stakes
2026	Gold Phoenix (IRE)	8	Hector Issac Berrios	Philip D'Amato	Agave Racing Stable, Little Red Feather Racing, Sterling Stables & Marsha Naify	1 1/8 miles	1:47.73	$250,000	II	
2025	Formidable Man	4	Umberto Rispoli	Michael McCarthy	Suzanne & William K. Warren Jr.	1 1/8 miles	1:48.55	$250,500	II	
2024	Johannes	4	Umberto Rispoli	Tim Yakteen	Cuyathy	1 1/8 miles	1:47.88	$252,000	II	
2023	Gold Phoenix (IRE)	5	Hector Berrios	Philip D'Amato	Little Red Feather Racing, Sterling Stables & Marsha Naify	1 1/8 miles	1:48.62	$252,000	II	
2022	Master Piece (CHI)	6	Abel Cedillo	Michael McCarthy	Fernando Diaz-Valdes, Baalbek Corp. & Don Alberto Stable	1 1/8 miles	1:46.25	$252,500	II	
2021	United	6	Flavien Prat	Richard E. Mandella	LNJ Foxwoods	1 1/8 miles	1:49.49	$251,000	II	
2020	United	5	Flavien Prat	Richard E. Mandella	LNJ Foxwoods	1 1/8 miles	1:46.71	$200,500	II	
2019	Bowies Hero	5	Flavien Prat	Philip D'Amato	Agave Racing Stable, ERJ Racing, Madaket Stables & Rockin Robin Racing Stable	1 1/8 miles	1:46.63	$250,351	II	
2018	Catapult	5	Drayden Van Dyke	John W. Sadler	Woodford Racing LLC	1 1/8 miles	1:46.07	$251,725	II	
2017	Hunt (IRE)	5	Flavien Prat	Philip D'Amato	Michael House	1 1/8 miles	1:47.62	$250,690	II	
2016	Midnight Storm	5	Rafael Bejarano	Philip D'Amato	A Venneri Racing & Little Red Feather Racing	1 1/8 miles	1:47.88	$251,380	II	
2015	Gabriel Charles	5	Mike E. Smith	Jeff Mullins	Sam Britt & Michael House	1 1/8 miles	1:48.13	$400,500	I	
2014	Tom's Tribute	4	Mike E. Smith	James M. Cassidy	Braly Family Trust	1 1/8 miles	1:46:01	$300,250	I	
2013	Jeranimo	7	Rafael Bejarano	Michael Pender	Robert V. LaPenta & Robert J. Wright	1 1/8 miles	1:45.80	$300,000	I	
2012	Acclamation	6	Pat Valenzuela	Donald Warren	Peter & Mary Hilvers, Ellwood W. & Judy Johnston	1 1/8 miles	1:46.99	$300,000	I	
2011	Acclamation	5	Joel Rosario	Donald Warren	Peter & Mary Hilvers, Ellwood W. & Judy Johnston	1 1/8 miles	1:46.99	$300,000	I	
2010	The Usual Q. T.	4	Victor Espinoza	James M. Cassidy	Don Van Racing, Michael Nentwig, George Saadeh & Jeffrey Byer	1 1/8 miles	1:47.28	$300,000	I	
2009	Global Hunter (ARG)	6	Corey Nakatani	A. C. Avila	L-Bo Racing & Monte Pyle	1 1/8 miles	1:46.24	$350,000	I	
Eddie Read Handicap
2008	Monzante	4	Rafael Bejarano	Mike R. Mitchell	Scott Anastasi, Jay & Gretchen Manoogian	1 1/8 miles	1:46.53	$400,000	I	
2007	After Market	4	Alex O. Solis	John Shirreffs	Pam & Martin Wygod	1 1/8 miles	1:47.36	$400,000	I	
2006	Aragorn (IRE)	4	Corey Nakatani	Neil D. Drysdale	Ballygallon Stud	1 1/8 miles	1:44.79	$400,000	I	
2005	Sweet Return (GB)	5	Alex O. Solis	Ron McAnally	Red Oak Stable	1 1/8 miles	1:46.53	$400,000	I	
2004	§ Special Ring	7	Victor Espinoza	Julio C. Canani	Prestonwood Farm	1 1/8 miles	1:45.90	$400,000	I	
2003	Special Ring	6	David R. Flores	Julio C. Canani	Prestonwood Farm	1 1/8 miles	1:45.87	$400,000	I	
2002	Sarafan	5	Corey Nakatani	Neil D. Drysdale	Gary A. Tanaka	1 1/8 miles	1:46.77	$400,000	I	
2001	Redattore (BRZ)	6	Alex O. Solis	Richard E. Mandella	Luis Alfredo Taunay	1 1/8 miles	1:47.16	$400,000	I	
2000	Ladies Din	5	Kent J. Desormeaux	Julio C. Canani	Terrence J. Lanni & Bernard C. Schiappa	1 1/8 miles	1:48.64	$400,000	I	
1999	Joe Who (BRZ)	6	Chris Antley	Bob Baffert	James E. Helzer	1 1/8 miles	1:48.75	$400,000	I	
1998	Subordination	4	David R. Flores	Gary Sciacca	Klaravich Stables	1 1/8 miles	1:47.49	$300,000	I	
1997	Expelled	5	Julio A. Garcia	Robert J. Frankel	Juddmonte Farms	1 1/8 miles	1:48.40	$300,000	I	
1996	Fastness (IRE)	6	Corey Nakatani	Jenine Sahadi	Evergreen Farm	1 1/8 miles	1:47.05	$313,000	I	
1995	Fastness (IRE)	5	Gary L. Stevens	Jenine Sahadi	Evergreen Farm	1 1/8 miles	1:48.42	$317,600	I	
1994	Approach the Bench (IRE)	6	Corey Nakatani	Richard J. Cross	John E. Mulhern	1 1/8 miles	1:48.83	$322,250	I	
1993	Kotashaan (FR)	5	Kent J. Desormeaux	Richard E. Mandella	La Presle Farm	1 1/8 miles	1:48.45	$318,750	I	
1992	§ Marquetry	5	David R. Flores	Robert J. Frankel	Juddmonte Farms, Robert J. Frankel Dale & Morley Engelson	1 1/8 miles	1:47.20	$322,250	I	
1991	Tight Spot	4	Laffit Pincay Jr.	Ron McAnally	VHW Stable, Frank Whitham, Frank Anderson & Rick Corradini	1 1/8 miles	1:47.32	$323,500	I	
1990	Fly Till Dawn	4	Rafael Q. Meza	Darrell Vienna	Josephine Gleis	1 1/8 miles	1:48.20	$270,250	I	
1989	Saratoga Passage	4	Eddie Delahoussaye	Robert J. Frankel	Saratoga I Stable	1 1/8 miles	1:49.00	$275,250	I	
1988	Deputy Governor	4	Eddie Delahoussaye	Neil D. Drysdale	Universal Stable	1 1/8 miles	1:48.80	$289,000	I	
1987	Sharrood	4	Laffit Pincay Jr.	John Gosden	Maktoum bin Rashid Al Maktoum	1 1/8 miles	1:48.00	$223,200	II	
1986	Al Mamoon	5	Pat Valenzuela	Robert J. Frankel	Bertram R. Firestone & Edmund A. Gann	1 1/8 miles	1:46.60	$180,900	II	
1985	Tsunami Slew	4	Gary L. Stevens	Edwin J. Gregson	Royal Lines (Lessee)	1 1/8 miles	1:46.80	$186,550	II	
1984	Ten Below	5	Laffit Pincay Jr.	Ron McAnally	Viola Sommer	1 1/8 miles	1:48.20	$165,950	II	
1983	Prince Spellbound	4	Chris Lamance	Lester Holt	William L. Pease	1 1/8 miles	1:48.80	$175,500	II	
1982	Wickerr	7	Eddie Delahoussaye	Robert J. Frankel	Edmund A. Gann	1 1/8 miles	1:48.40	$162,500	II	
1981	Wickerr	6	Chris McCarron	Robert J. Frankel	Edmund A. Gann	1 1/8 miles	1:49.80	$137,000	III	
1980	Go West Young Man	5	Eddie Delahoussaye	Mary Lou Tuck	Wild Plum Farm	1 1/8 miles	1:47.60	$109,200	III	
1979	Good Lord (NZ)	8	Bill Shoemaker	Charles E. Whittingham	Michael L. Hines	1 1/8 miles	1:49.20	$69,250		
1978	Effervescing	5	Laffit Pincay Jr.	D. Wayne Lukas	Mel Haley & Albert Yank	1 1/8 miles	1:48.60	$55,550		
1977	No Turning	4	Fernando Toro	Robert J. Frankel	Martin Ritt	1 1/8 miles	1:48.80	$54,900		
1976	Branford Court	6	Rudy Campas	Gene Cleveland	Cardiff Stock Farm	1 1/8 miles	1:48.40	$44,150		
1975	Blue Times	4	Jerry Lambert	Charles E. Whittingham	Aaron U. Jones	1 1/8 miles	1:49.20	$46,200		
1974	My Old Friend	5	Antonio L. Diaz	Vincent Clyne	Elmendorf Farm	1 1/8 miles	1:49.20	$33,400		

Notes:
§ Ran as an entry

== See also ==
- List of American and Canadian Graded races
