= Julio Canani =

American horse trainer (1938–2021)

Personal information
- Born: November 13, 1938 Oxapampa, Peru
- Died: February 5, 2021 (aged 82) Pasadena, California, U.S.
- Occupation: Trainer

Horse racing career
- Sport: Horse racing
- Career wins: 1,137 ($49,274,820)

Major racing wins
- Del Mar Derby (1988, 1998, 1999, 2004); Hollywood Derby (1988); San Francisco Mile Stakes (1989, 1990, 1999, 2000, 2006); Santa Ana Handicap (1989, 1991); Santa Anita Handicap (1989); Citation Handicap (1990, 2008); San Marcos Stakes (1990, 2010); Wickerr Handicap (1991, 2002, 2005); Dahlia Handicap (1998, 1999); La Jolla Handicap (1998, 2004); Palomar Handicap (1998, 2000); Gamely Breeders' Cup Handicap (1999, 2006); Royal Heroine Stakes (1999, 2000); Oak Tree Mile Stakes (1999, 2001, 2008); Shoemaker Mile Stakes (1999, 2000, 2002); Wilshire Handicap (2001); Santa Barbara Handicap (2005); Yellow Ribbon Stakes (2000); San Luis Obispo Handicap (2002); Eddie Read Handicap (2000, 2003, 2004); American Handicap (2004); Del Mar Oaks (2004); Del Mar Debutante Stakes (2004); Sunshine Millions Oaks (2004); Santa Anita Oaks (2004, 2005); California Cup Mile (2005); John C. Mabee Handicap (2005); San Clemente Handicap (2005, 2006); San Pasqual Handicap (2007); Del Mar Handicap (2008, 2009) Breeders' Cup wins: Breeders' Cup Mile (1999, 2001); Breeders' Cup Juvenile Fillies (2004)

Significant horses
- Silic, Val Royal, Tranquility Lake, Sweet Catomine

Julio Canani (November 13, 1938 – February 5, 2021) was a Peruvian-born American horse trainer in Thoroughbred horse racing. He won three Breeders' Cup races.

== Biography ==
Canani emigrated to the United States in 1954, and settled in California where he began working for racehorse trainer Tommy Doyle. In 1968, he obtained his trainer's license and over the next few years earned a reputation for developing claiming horses into stakes race winners. In 1993, having won numerous major California races including the prestigious Santa Anita Handicap, Canani took a break from racing until the spring of 1997 when he returned to operate the Nick Canani Racing Stable at Hollywood Park Racetrack. He went on to win the 1999 and 2001 editions of the Breeders' Cup Mile and in 2004 the Breeders' Cup Juvenile Fillies.

Canani was afflicted with dementia in recent years. He died on February 5, 2021, at Huntington Hospital in Pasadena, California. He was 82, and contracted COVID-19 in the time leading up to his death.
