= Alex Solis =

Panamanian jockey (born 1964)

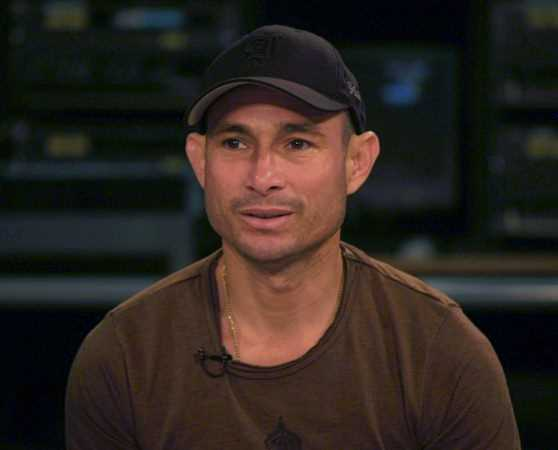
- Alex Solis, 2006

Personal information
- Born: March 25, 1964 (age 62) Panama City, Panama
- Occupation: Jockey

Horse racing career
- Sport: Horse racing
- Career wins: 5,035 As of 2017

Major racing wins
- American Classics wins: Preakness Stakes (1986); Breeders' Cup wins: Breeders' Cup Sprint (2000); Breeders' Cup Turf (2003); Breeders' Cup Classic (2003); Canadian Classic Race wins: Breeders' Stakes (2012); International race wins: Dubai Golden Shaheen (2000, 2004); Dubai World Cup (2004); Graded Stakes wins: Florida Derby (1986, 1997); Santa Anita Derby (1986, 2006); San Juan Capistrano Handicap; (1986, 1996, 2006); Los Angeles Handicap; (1988, 1999, 2002, 2006); Hollywood Derby (1989, 1999, 2002); La Brea Stakes (1990, 2002); Malibu Stakes (1990, 2000); San Felipe Stakes (1990, 1992); Del Mar Oaks (1992, 2008); Hawthorne Handicap (1993); Eatontown Handicap (2000); John C. Mabee Handicap (2003); Eddie Read Handicap (2001, 2005, 2007); Bing Crosby Handicap (1988, 1998, 2000, 2001); Pat O'Brien Handicap (2006); Del Mar Handicap (1990, 1997, 2003, 2006); Del Mar Debutante Stakes; (1990, 1991, 1994, 2005); Del Mar Futurity (1991, 1994); Santa Paula Stakes (1995, 1997, 2007); La Cañada Stakes (1996, 2003, 2004); Morris Handicap (1996); Pacific Classic Stakes (1996); Queen Elizabeth II Challenge Cup Stakes (1997); Wood Memorial Stakes (1997); Yellow Ribbon Stakes (1997, 2005, 2009); Santa Anita Handicap (1998); Vernon O. Underwood Stakes (1999); Providencia Stakes(1999, 2002, 2005); San Gabriel Handicap (2000, 2003); Hollywood Turf Cup Stakes (2001); Secretariat Stakes (2001); Manhattan Handicap (2002); Del Mar Handicap (2003, 2006); Sham Stakes (2003, 2004, 2009, 2010); Sunshine Millions Sprint (2003); Carter Handicap (2004); Metropolitan Handicap (2004); Acorn Stakes (2006); Eddie Logan Stakes (2007); Las Cienegas Handicap (2008); Gamely Stakes (2009); San Clemente Handicap (2009); Sham Stakes (2009); San Rafael Stakes (2009); Railbird Stakes (2010)

Racing awards
- George Woolf Memorial Jockey Award (1997)

Honours
- Calder Race Course Hall of Fame (2002); United States Racing Hall of Fame (2014)

Significant horses
- Snow Chief, Kona Gold, Beat Hollow, Pleasantly Perfect, Captain Bodgit, Victory Gallop, Brother Derek, Megahertz, The Pamplemousse, Irish Mission
- Updated on April 13, 2007

Alex O. Solis (born March 25, 1964) is a Panamanian jockey based in the United States. He lives in Glendora, California and rides predominantly in Southern California. He got his big break and his first gained national prominence when he won the 1986 Preakness Stakes with Snow Chief. In 2014, he was elected to the horse racing hall of fame and on January 1, 2015, became the 29th jockey in North American history to have 5,000 wins.

== Background ==
He grew up poor on a farm in San Carlos, Panama, where he spent a lot of time around horses. He visited a race track for the first time when he was 13 and by 14 was enrolled in a jockey school. After two years in jockey school and after becoming the leading apprentice jockey in Panama, he came to the United States in 1982 with only $700 and did not speak English. He began his American career at Calder Race Course in Florida, where he quickly achieved racing success and was given the nickname El Maestrito ("The Little Master"). He told interviewers that he worked to improve his English by watching television and listening to music.

== Racing career ==
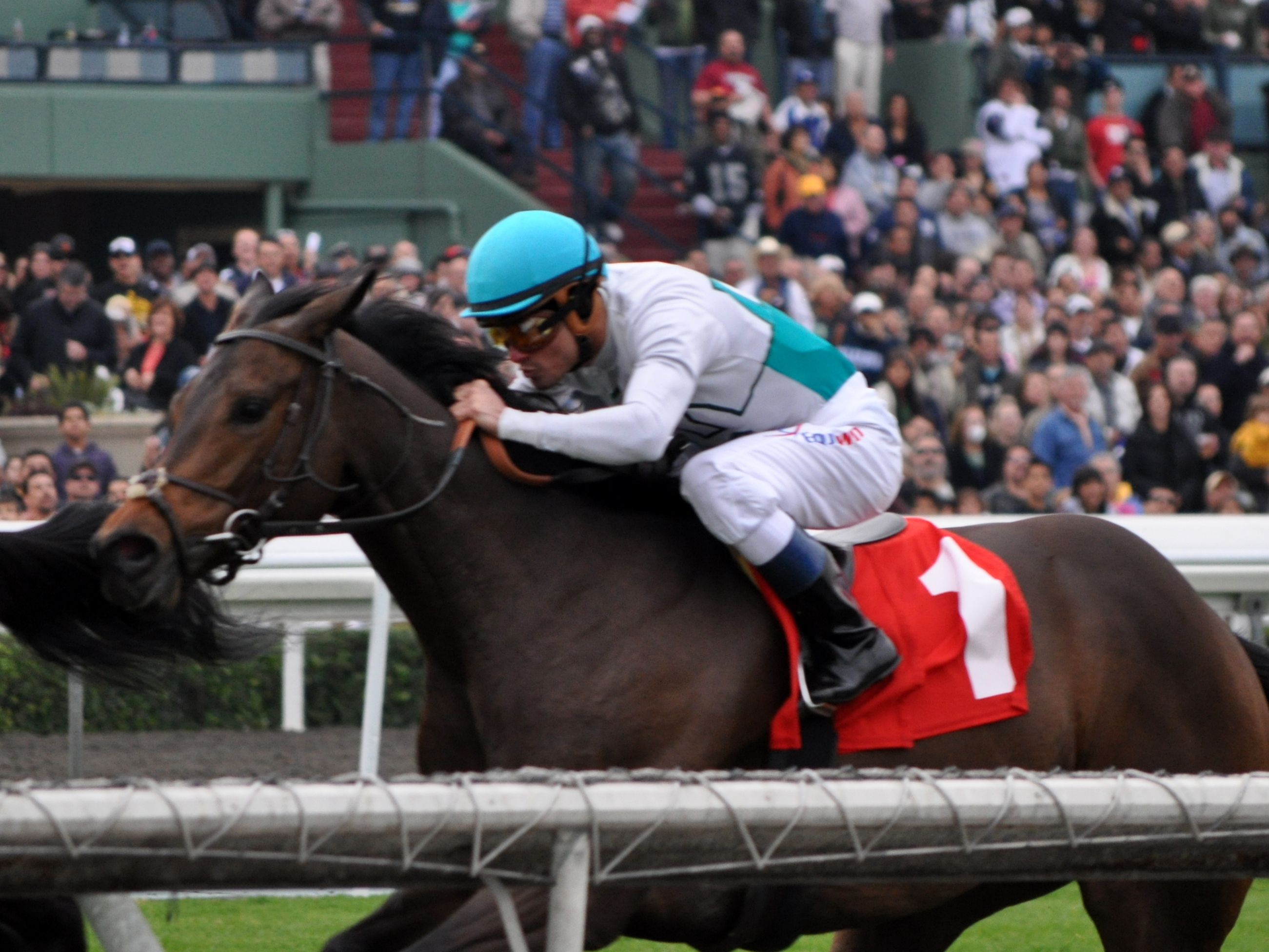
Solis on Leandros, Santa Anita Park, 2009

Solis' first rode in the Kentucky Derby in 1983 on a longshot named Current Hope, and did not place in the money. He rode the Derby again in 1986 on Snow Chief, who had won the Santa Anita Derby and was the morning line favorite, but again finished well back. The horse and rider went on to with the Preakness Stakes that year, marking Solis' only win to date in an American Triple Crown race. He was third in the 1991 Derby on Mane Minister, and also third in the Belmont Stakes on the same horse. Solis finished second in the Kentucky Derby and third in the Preakness with Captain Bodgit in 1997, second in the Derby with Victory Gallop in 1998 and second in both the Derby and the Belmont with Aptitude in 2000. His first Breeders' Cup win was the 2000 Breeders' Cup Sprint on Kona Gold. He won two Breeders' Cup races in 2003 with Johar (who finished in a dead heat) in the Breeders' Cup Turf, and the Breeders' Cup Classic on Pleasantly Perfect, both trained by Richard Mandella. He ended 2003 ranked fourth nationally in purse earnings with a career-best $16,304,252.

He won the 2004 Dubai World Cup on Pleasantly Perfect, and the 2006 Santa Anita Derby aboard Brother Derek. In 2010, Solis rode Mandurah to a new world record for a mile on the turf at Monmouth Park, 1:31.23, breaking the previous record of 1:31.41 set by Mister Light in 2005 at Gulfstream Park.

His first two sons, Alex Solis II and Andreu Solis, both became bloodstock agents and purchase and sell horses for various clients, some of whom his father has ridden in races. In 2009, Solis won the Sham Stakes aboard The Pamplemousse, a horse who was part-owned by Alex II, and in 2012 rode the filly Irish Mission to victory on the turf at Woodbine to capture the Breeders' Stakes. The win marked his first ever victory in a Canadian Triple Crown race.

Solis' most serious riding injury was a broken back in 2004, when he was out eight months following surgery that included two titanium rods and eight screws. He has also had broken knees, fingers, toes, ribs and his left leg. He was one of the jockeys featured in Animal Planet's 2009 reality documentary, Jockeys, something he enjoyed doing, but felt that the end product did not accurately portray the life of a jockey. He commented, " They put more drama–or a different type of drama–into horse racing. The sport is already full of drama with all the hardships that jockeys have to go through, such as breaking bones. So they didn't need to add more drama."

In 2002, Solis was inducted in the Calder Race Course Hall of Fame. In 2010, Solis was inducted into the Panama Racing Hall of Fame. He was elected to the National Museum of Racing's Hall of Fame in 2014 and earned his 5,000th North American racing win at Santa Anita Park on January 1, 2015, becoming only the 29th jockey in North American history to do so. His 5,000th win came on a horse named Lutine Belle, owned partly by trainer Jerry Hollendorfer and part-owned by Solis' son Alex II.

On April 30, 2015, Solis was appointed by Governor Jerry Brown to the California Horse Racing Board to fill the seat vacated by Bo Derek. His appointment must be confirmed by the State Senate. He plans to continue riding horses while serving on the board.

On November 26, 2017, he announced his retirement from riding horses and is currently working with his son Andreu and Matt Weinmann at Equine Analysis finding future G1 Winners and Champions.

Alex Solis has a son named Austin who is also a jockey.

=== Year-end charts ===
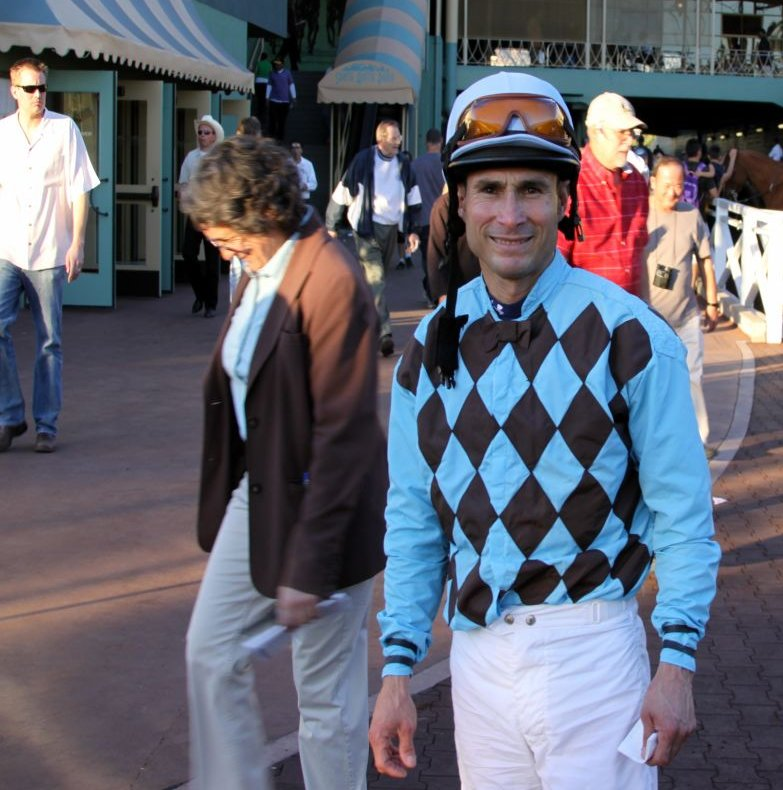
Solis in 2009

Chart (2000–present)	Peak position
National Earnings List for Jockeys 2000	11
National Earnings List for Jockeys 2001	8
National Earnings List for Jockeys 2002	8
National Earnings List for Jockeys 2003	4
National Earnings List for Jockeys 2004	9
National Earnings List for Jockeys 2005	14
National Earnings List for Jockeys 2006	12
National Earnings List for Jockeys 2007	35
National Earnings List for Jockeys 2008	37
National Earnings List for Jockeys 2009	30
National Earnings List for Jockeys 2010	66
National Earnings List for Jockeys 2011	28
National Earnings List for Jockeys 2012	91
National Earnings List for Jockeys 2013	77
National Earnings List for Jockeys 2014	175

== See also ==
- List of jockeys
- Thoroughbred horse racing
