= Mariah's Storm =

American-bred Thoroughbred racehorse

- Sire: Rahy
- Grandsire: Blushing Groom
- Dam: Immense
- Damsire: Roberto
- Sex: Mare
- Foaled: 1991
- Country: United States
- Colour: Bay
- Breeder: Crescent Farm
- Owner: Thunderhead Farms
- Trainer: 1) Don Von Hemel; 2) Donnie K. Von Hemel
- Record: 16: 10-2-1
- Earnings: $724,894

Major wins
- Arlington-Washington Lassie Stakes (1993); Ak-Sar-Ben Oaks (1994); Arlington Oaks (1994); Arlington Matron Stakes (1995); Falls City Handicap (1995); Turfway Breeders' Cup Stakes (1995)

Honours
- Mariah's Storm Stakes at Arlington Park
- Last updated on June 18, 2007

Mariah's Storm (April 1, 1991 – February 17, 2022) was an American thoroughbred racehorse, bred by Donald T. Johnson's Crescent Farm in Lexington, Kentucky. She suffered a serious injury while racing but later made a full recovery and continued her career.

In 2005, film director John Gatins made a motion picture titled Dreamer: Inspired by a True Story in which the horse "Soñador" is based on Mariah's Storm.

== Background ==
Mariah's Storm was trained by the father and son team of Don Von Hemel and Donnie K. The father won the 1994 Ak-Sar-Ben Oaks and the 1995 Falls City Handicap with her and the son the 1993 Arlington-Washington Lassie Stakes, 1994 Arlington Heights Oaks, and in 1995 the Arlington Matron Handicap and the Turfway Park Budweiser Breeders' Cup Stakes.

In 1993, Mariah's Storm was working on building points to qualify for a chance to run in that fall's Breeders' Cup when she fractured her front left cannon bone while running in the Alcibiades Stakes at Keeneland Race Course. When a horse injures her cannon bone, it usually ends her racing career. However, Mariah's Storm's owners and trainers refused to give up hope and with the work of several skilled veterinarians, the fractured cannon bone healed and strengthened.

== Full recovery ==
In September 1993, before the injury occurred, Mariah's Storm won the Arlington-Washington Lassie Stakes at Chicago's Arlington Park. This was a Grade III stakes for two-year-old-fillies. After her injury healed and she fully recovered, she made a return to racing in 1994 and won the Arlington Oaks. In 1995, she won the Arlington Matron Stakes. Since her record of winning all three stakes races at Arlington Park was a rare accomplishment, Arlington officials named the Mariah's Storm Stakes in her honor.

Racing at age four, in September 1995 Mariah's Storm won the Turfway Breeders' Cup Stakes at Turfway Park, defeating future U.S. Racing Hall of Fame filly Serena's Song, also a daughter of Rahy. She then won the Falls City Handicap at Churchill Downs and competed in the Breeders' Cup Distaff, where she finished ninth in a ten-horse field.

== Produce record ==
Mariah's Storm made her mark on the racing industry as a broodmare, producing the great Giant's Causeway (by Storm Cat), the European Horse of the Year for 2000. She also produced Freud, a full brother to Giant's Causeway who stands at Sequel Stallions New York. Freud was the leading sire in New York in 2008. She has also produced significant mares: her first filly, a full sister to Giant's Causeway named You'resothrilling, produced four-time Group 1 winner Gleneagles and Irish 1,000 Guineas winner Marvellous. Mariah's Storm also produced a Sadler's Wells filly named Love Me Only that is the dam of Storm the Stars (by Sea the Stars), winner of the Group 2 Great Voltigeur Stakes and placed in multiple Group 1 races. Mariah's Storm produced six colts in a row from 1997 to 2002, followed by seven fillies from 2005 to 2015, and died on February 17, 2022.

== In the media ==
The 2005 film Dreamer was loosely based on the story of Mariah's Storm. However, in the movie, Soñador (the horse based on Mariah's Storm) won the Breeders' Cup Classic (as the fifth filly ever to participate in that race), whereas in real life, Mariah's Storm ran in the Breeders' Cup Distaff and finished ninth of ten.

== Pedigree ==
Pedigree of Mariah's Storm, bay mare, foaled April 1, 1991
Sire Rahy chestnut 1985	Blushing Groom ch. 1974	Red God ch. 1954	Nasrullah
Sire Rahy chestnut 1985	Blushing Groom ch. 1974	Red God ch. 1954	Spring Run
Sire Rahy chestnut 1985	Blushing Groom ch. 1974	Runaway Bride b. 1962	Wild Risk
Sire Rahy chestnut 1985	Blushing Groom ch. 1974	Runaway Bride b. 1962	Aimee
Sire Rahy chestnut 1985	Glorious Song b. 1976	Halo blk. 1969	Hail to Reason
Sire Rahy chestnut 1985	Glorious Song b. 1976	Halo blk. 1969	Cosmah
Sire Rahy chestnut 1985	Glorious Song b. 1976	Ballade dkb/br. 1972	Herbager
Sire Rahy chestnut 1985	Glorious Song b. 1976	Ballade dkb/br. 1972	Miss Swapsco
Dam Immense bay 1979	Roberto b. 1969	Hail To Reason br. 1958	Turn-To
Dam Immense bay 1979	Roberto b. 1969	Hail To Reason br. 1958	Nothirdchance
Dam Immense bay 1979	Roberto b. 1969	Bramalea dkb/br. 1959	Nashua
Dam Immense bay 1979	Roberto b. 1969	Bramalea dkb/br. 1959	Rarelea
Dam Immense bay 1979	Imsodear b. 1967	Chieftain br. 1961	Bold Ruler
Dam Immense bay 1979	Imsodear b. 1967	Chieftain br. 1961	Pocahontas
Dam Immense bay 1979	Imsodear b. 1967	Ironically ch. 1960	Intent
Dam Immense bay 1979	Imsodear b. 1967	Ironically ch. 1960	Itsabet (Family 11)

== See also ==
- Dreamer: Inspired by a True Story
- Giant's Causeway (horse)
