= Triple Bend Stakes =

- Class: Grade III
- Location: Santa Anita Park; Arcadia, California, USA
- Inaugurated: 1952 (as Lakes and Flowers Handicap at Hollywood Park Racetrack)
- Race type: Thoroughbred - Flat racing
- Website: Santa Anita Park

Race information
- Distance: 7 furlongs
- Surface: Dirt
- Track: Left-handed
- Qualification: Four-years-old & up
- Weight: 124 lbs with allowances
- Purse: $100,000 (2025)

The Triple Bend Stakes is a Grade III American Thoroughbred horse race for horses age four years and older over a distance of seven furlongs on the dirt held at Santa Anita Park in Arcadia, California in June. The race currently offers a purse of $100,000.

== History ==
The event was inaugurated on the 10 June 1952 as the Lakes And Flowers Handicap and was won by Intent defeating Admiral Drake with Last Round finishing in third before a crowd of 42,004. In 1956 the event was shortened to 6 furlongs.

The event reverted to its original distance of 7 furlongs in 1973.

In 1979 the name was changed to Triple Bend Handicap honoring Frank McMahon's colt Triple Bend whose wins included the Santa Anita Handicap and who set a world record time of 1:19.80 for seven furlongs on dirt in winning the 1972 Los Angeles Handicap at Hollywood Park Racetrack. In 1980, Rich Cream broke that mark with another world record time for seven furlongs on dirt in winning the Triple Bend Handicap.

In 1988 the event was upgraded to a Grade III and ten years later to GII. For a period of 16 years the event was a Grade I, ending in 2018.

After the closure of Hollywood Park in 2013, the event was moved to Santa Anita Park.

In 2025 the event was downgraded by the Thoroughbred Owners and Breeders Association to Gradec III status.

Time To Leave is the only mare to have won the race, doing so in 1970.

== Records ==
Speed record:

- 7 furlongs – 1:19.40 Rich Cream (1980) (World record)
- 6 furlongs – 1:07.80 Time To Leave (1970)

Margins:

- 8 1/2 lengths – Robyn Dancer (1991)

Most wins:

- 2 – Porterhouse (1955 & 1956)

Most wins by an owner:

- 3 - Llangollen Farm Stable (1955, 1956, 1957)

Most wins by a jockey:

- 8 – Bill Shoemaker (1953, 1960, 1962, 1963, 1964, 1973, 1979, 1980)

Most wins by a trainer:

- 8 – Bob Baffert (1996, 2009, 2010, 2014, 2016, 2020, 2021, 2025)

== Winners ==
Year	Winner	Age	Jockey	Trainer	Owner	Distance	Time	Purse	Grade	Ref
At Santa Anita Park – Triple Bend Stakes
2026	Stronghold	5	Antonio Fresu	Philip D'Amato	Eric M. Waller and Sharon Waller	7 furlongs	1:21.36	$100,000	III	
2025	Nysos	4	Juan J. Hernandez	Bob Baffert	Baoma	7 furlongs	1:21.28	$100,000	III	
2024	Happy Jack	5	Edwin Maldonado	Doug F. O'Neill	Calumet Farm	7 furlongs	1:21.32	$196,000	II	
2023	Spirit of Makena	5	Joe Bravo	George Papaprodromou	Bruce Chandler	7 furlongs	1:23.07	$201,000	II	
2022	American Theorem	5	Joe Bravo	George Papaprodromou	Kretz Racing	7 furlongs	1:22.17	$200,500	II	
2021	Magic On Tap	5	Juan J. Hernandez	Bob Baffert	Summer Wind Equine	7 furlongs	1:23.54	$200,000	II	
2020	McKinzie	5	Mike E. Smith	Bob Baffert	Karl Watson, Michael E. Pegram & Paul Weitman	7 furlongs	1:22.56	$200,000	II	
2019	Air Strike	4	Norberto Arroyo Jr.	Philip D'Amato	Madaket Stables, Slam Dunk Racing, Michael Nentwig	7 furlongs	1:23.12	$201,053	II	
2018	City of Light	4	Drayden Van Dyke	Michael W. McCarthy	Mr. & Mrs. William K. Warren Jr.	7 furlongs	1:21.35	$400,000	I	
2017	Denman's Call	4	Tyler Baze	Doug F. O'Neill	Gilman Racing, Westside Rentals.com & W.C. Racing	7 furlongs	1:20.94	$400,690	I	
2016	Lord Nelson	4	Rafael Bejarano	Bob Baffert	Spendthrift Farm	7 furlongs	1:21.04	$301,035	I	
2015	Masochistic	5	Tyler Baze	Ronald W. Ellis	Los Pollos Hermanos Racing & Jay Em Ess Stable	7 furlongs	1:20.25	$300,500	I	
2014	Declassify	4	Martin Garcia	Bob Baffert	Kaleem Shah	7 furlongs	1:22.03	$300,250	I	
At Hollywood Park – Triple Bend Handicap
2013	Centralinteligence	5	Victor Espinoza	Ronald W. Ellis	Amerman Racing Stables, Bongo Racing Stable, Gary Finder et al.	7 furlongs	1:21.57	$250,750	I	
2012	Camp Victory	5	Joseph Talamo	Michael R. Mitchell	Jacobsen, Featherston & Millers	7 furlongs	1:22.75	$250,000	I	
2011	Smiling Tiger	4	Joel Rosario	Jeffrey L. Bonde	Alan Phillip Klein & Philip Lebherz	7 furlongs	1:21.22	$250,000	I	
2010	E Z's Gentleman	5	Martin A. Pedroza	Bob Baffert	Arnold Zetcher	7 furlongs	1:21.11	$248,500	I	
2009	Zensational	3	Victor Espinoza	Bob Baffert	Zayat Stables	7 furlongs	1:21.34	$296,000	I	
2008	Street Boss	4	David R. Flores	Bruce Headley	Blue Gate Corp., Bruce Headley & Marsha Naify	7 furlongs	1:22.42	$300,000	I	
2007	Bilo	7	Joseph Talamo	Martin F. Jones	King Edward Racing Stable	7 furlongs	1:21.65	$300,000	I	
2006	Siren Lure	5	Alex O. Solis	Art Sherman	Stuart Kesselman, Tony & Marilyn Melkonian	7 furlongs	1:21.29	$300,000	I	
2005	Unfurl the Flag	5	Corey Nakatani	David Bernstein	Ailshie Gaylord, Tom Harris, Bruce Rose et al.	7 furlongs	1:20.95	$350,000	I	
2004	Pohave	6	Victor Espinoza	Doug F. O'Neill	Kagele Brothers, Ty Leatherman & Mark Leib	7 furlongs	1:21.06	$300,000	I	
2003	Joey Franco	4	Pat Valenzuela	Darrell Vienna	Jerry Frankel	7 furlongs	1:21.56	$269,000	I	
2002	Disturbingthepeace	4	Victor Espinoza	Darrell Vienna	Rita & David Milch	7 furlongs	1:21.09	$266,000	II	
2001	Ceeband	4	Matt S. Garcia	John W. Sadler	C R K Stable	7 furlongs	1:21.17	$266,000	II	
2000	Elaborate	5	Victor Espinoza	J. Paco Gonzalez	John Tofan & Trudy McCaffery	7 furlongs	1:21.19	$298,000	II	
1999	Mazel Trick	4	Chris McCarron	Robert J. Frankel	3 Plus U Stable	7 furlongs	1:19.97	$278,000	II	
1998	Son of a Pistol	6	Alex O. Solis	Bruce Headley	Luis Asistio, BBC Stables & Jeff Davenport	7 furlongs	1:20.81	$240,000	II	
1997	Score Quick	5	Goncalino Almeida	Melvin F. Stute	Bill M. Thomas	7 furlongs	1:21.01	$196,300	III	
1996	Letthebighossroll	8	Chris McCarron	Bob Baffert	Romi Stables	7 furlongs	1:21.43	$189,100	III	
1995	Concept Win	5	Pat Valenzuela	Willard L. Proctor	Glen Hill Farm	7 furlongs	1:21.09	$108,100	III	
1994	Memo (CHI)	7	Paul Atkinson	Richard E. Mandella	Stud Panter	7 furlongs	1:20.52	:$107,400	III	
1993	Now Listen	6	Kent J. Desormeaux	Robert J. Frankel	Juddmonte Farms	7 furlongs	1:20.83	$111,400	III	
1992	Slew the Surgeon	4	Manuel G. Linares	Eric Guillot	Jens L. List Jr.	7 furlongs	1:21.44	$109,600	III	
1991	Robyn Dancer	4	Laffit Pincay Jr.	Darrell Vienna	Herrick & No Problem Stable	7 furlongs	1:21.10	$107,700	III	
1990	Prospectors Gamble	5	Julio A. Garcia	Brian A. Mayberry	Jay Emm Ess Stable	7 furlongs	1:21.40	$109,200	III	
1989	Sensational Star	5	Rafael Q. Meza	William Spawr	Calhoun-Risoldi-Sullivan	7 furlongs	1:21.40	$83,450	III	
1988	Perfec Travel	6	Corey Black	Art Sherman	Samuel J. Matar	7 furlongs	1:22.20	$83,350	III	
1987	Bedside Promise	5	Rafael Q. Meza	Robert L. Martin	Jawl Brothers	7 furlongs	1:21.00	$80,250	Listed	
1986	Sabona	4	Chris McCarron	John Gosden	Sir Ernest L. Harrison & Audrey Reed	7 furlongs	1:21.00	$80,900	Listed	
1985	Fifty Six Ina Row	4	Laffit Pincay Jr.	Jaime Villagomez	John Valpredo	7 furlongs	1:20.80	$65,500	Listed	
1984	Debonaire Junior	3	Chris McCarron	Noble Threewitt	Jack D. Rogers	7 furlongs	1:21.20	$65,180	Listed	
1983	Regal Falcon	5	Eddie Delahoussaye	Richard E. Mandella	H. Sarkowsky, M. Wygod & D. Wyman	7 furlongs	1:23.40	$53,200	Listed	
1982	Never Tabled	5	Chris McCarron	Richard E. Mandella	Martin J. Wygod	7 furlongs	1:21.00	$54,250	Listed	
1981	Summer Time Guy	5	Chris McCarron	Willard L. Proctor	William R. Hawn	7 furlongs	1:20.20	$64,400	Listed	
1980	Rich Cream	5	Bill Shoemaker	Laz Barrera	Carmen Barrera	7 furlongs	1:19.40	$54,750	Listed	
1979	White Rammer	5	Bill Shoemaker	Charles E. Whittingham	Mr. & Mrs. J. C. Bryant	7 furlongs	1:21.20	$42,650	Listed	
Lakes and Flowers Handicap
1978	Drapier	6	Fernando Toro	Jack Van Berg	Gilster, Querbes, Stall & Van Berg	7 furlongs	1:21.20	$42,200	Listed	
1977	Painted Wagon	4	Chuck Baltazar	Marvin G. Williams	Silver Creek Ranch	7 furlongs	1:20.20	$43,750	Listed	
1976	Home Jerome	6	Marco Castaneda	Randy Winick	Maribel G. Blum	7 furlongs	1:21.20	$44,050	Listed	
1975	Messenger Of Song	3	Jerry Lambert	Gordon C. Campbell	Bernard J. Ridder	7 furlongs	1:20.60	$44,650	Listed	
1974	Woodland Pines	5	Laffit Pincay Jr.	Cecil Jolly	Linda B. Smith	7 furlongs	1:20.60	$33,300	Listed	
1973	Briartic (CAN)	5	Bill Shoemaker	Wally Dunn	Dr. M. F. Bennett	7 furlongs	1:21.20	$43,950	Listed	
1972	Miles Tyson	4	Donald Pierce	Frank E. Childs	Perne L. & Charles T. Grissom	6 furlongs	1:08.00	$27,550		
1971	Fleet Surprise	5	Donald Pierce	Frank E. Childs	Perne L. & Charles T. Grissom	6 furlongs	1:09.40	$27,900		
1970	ƒ Time To Leave	5	Danny Velasquez	John G. Canty	Neil S. McCarthy	6 furlongs	1:07.80	$27,900		
1969	Baffle	4	Ismael Valenzuela	Johnny Longden	Frank M. McMahon	6 furlongs	1:08.40	$21,550		
1968	Speedy King	4	Johnny Sellers	Glenn H. Moeller	Miles Arnold	6 furlongs	1:08.20	$22,450		
1967	Kissin' George	4	William Mahorney	Michael E. Millerick	DeCourcy Graham	6 furlongs	1:08.20	$22,450		
1966	Azure Te	4	Jerry Lambert	Michael E. Millerick	Mr. & Mrs. Louis K. Shapiro	6 furlongs	1:09.20	$22,800		
1965	Solazo	6	Jerry Lambert	William J. Hirsch	King Ranch	6 furlongs	1:09.60	$22,800		
1964	Turloc	4	Bill Shoemaker	Hurst Philpot	Helen L. Kenaston	6 furlongs	1:09.60	$22,000		
1963	Windy Sea	6	Bill Shoemaker	Michael E. Millerick	Mrs. Nat Goldston	6 furlongs	1:08.80	$21,750		
1962	Wallet Lifter	3	Bill Shoemaker	Mesh Tenney	Rex Ellsworth	6 furlongs	1:08.80	$27,450		
1961	Windy Sands	4	Ray York	Jack M. Phillips	Connie M. Ring	6 furlongs	1:08.80	$21,900		
1960	Aliwar	5	Bill Shoemaker	James D. Jordan	Jimmie Garibaldi	6 furlongs	1:09.40	$21,800		
1959	Fleet Nasrullah	4	Ismael Valenzuela	James I. Nazworthy	Fannie Hertz	6 furlongs	1:09.20	$26,650		
1958	The Searcher	4	John Longden	Theodore B. Saladin	Mr. & Mrs. Bert W. Martin	6 furlongs	1:09.60	$27,150		
1957	§ Nashville	3	Ismael Valenzuela	Charles E. Whittingham	Llangollen Farm Stable	6 furlongs	1:09.20	$27,200		
1956	Porterhouse	5	Ismael Valenzuela	Charles E. Whittingham	Llangollen Farm Stable	6 furlongs	1:09.00	$27,300		
1955	Porterhouse	4	John Longden	Charles E. Whittingham	Llangollen Farm Stable	7 furlongs	1:21.20	$28,300		
1954	Curragh King (IRE)	4	Roy Lumm	James Wallace	Mr. & Mrs Edward M. Goemans	7 furlongs	1:21.20	$28,750		
1953	Pet Bully	5	Bill Shoemaker	Charles E. Whittingham	Ada L. Rice	7 furlongs	1:21.80	$28,300		
1952	Intent	4	Euclid LeBlanc	William J. Hirsch	Brookfield Farm	7 furlongs	1:21.80	$22,500		

Legend:
All Weather Track Dirt
Notes:
§ Ran as part of an entry
ƒ Filly or Mare

== See also ==
List of American and Canadian Graded races
