= Bing Crosby Stakes =

American Thoroughbred horse race

- Class: Grade I
- Location: Del Mar Racetrack; Del Mar, California, USA
- Inaugurated: 1946
- Race type: Thoroughbred – Flat racing
- Website: www.dmtc.com

Race information
- Distance: 6 furlongs
- Surface: Dirt
- Track: left-handed
- Qualification: Three-year-olds and up
- Weight: Assigned
- Purse: $400,000 (2023)

The Bing Crosby Stakes is an American Thoroughbred horse race held annually at Del Mar Racetrack in Del Mar, California. The Grade 1 race is open to horses three years of age and up. It is run on Dirt at a distance of six furlong and presently offers a purse of $400,000, up from 250,000.

The race is named for entertainer Bing Crosby, a founding partner of Del Mar Racetrack and a racehorse owner and breeder.

== Records ==
Handicap record

- Lord Nelson – 1:07.65 (2016)

Most wins by a jockey:

- 6 - Flavien Prat (2015, 2016, 2017, 2018, 2020, 2021)

Most wins by a trainer:

- 4 – Bob Baffert (1992, 2009, 2011, 2016)
- 4 – Bruce Headley (1998, 2000, 2001, 2008)

== Winners ==
Year	Winner	Jockey	Trainer	Owner	Time
2026	Listenupshance	Emisael Jaramillo	Doug F. O'Neill	Great Friends Stables and Run Fast Racing	1:09.33
2025	Lovesick Blues	Geovanni Franco	Librado Barocio	Mia Familia Racing Stable	1:08.74
2024	The Chosen Vron	Hector Isaac Berrios	J. Eric Kruljac	Robert Fetkin, John Sondereker, Richard Thornburgh, J. Eric Kruljac	1:08.99
2023	The Chosen Vron	Hector Isaac Berrios	J. Eric Kruljac	Robert Fetkin, John Sondereker, Richard Thornburgh, J. Eric Kruljac	1:09.24
2022	American Theorem	Joe Bravo	George Papaprodromou	Kretz Racing	1:08.67
2021	Dr. Schivel	Flavien Prat	Mark Glatt	Red Baron's Barn, Rancho Temescal, William A. Branch and William Dean Reaves	1:10.47
2020	Collusion Illusion	Flavien Prat	Mark Glatt	Agnew, Schneider, Xitco, et al.	1:10.41
2019	Cistron	Victor Espinoza	John W. Sadler	Hronis Racing LLC	1:09.95
2018	Ransom the Moon	Flavien Prat	Phillip D'Amato	Agave Racing Stable	1:10.08
2017	Ransom the Moon	Flavien Prat	Phillip D'Amato	Agave Racing Stable	1:09.63
2016	Lord Nelson	Flavien Prat	Bob Baffert	Spendthrift Farm	1:07.65
2015	Wild Dude	Flavien Prat	Jerry Hollendorfer	Hollendorfer/Smith	1:09.51
2014	Big Macher	Tyler Baze	Richard Baltas	Mansor/Tachycardia Stables	1:08.82
2013	Points Offthebench	Mike E. Smith	Tim Yakteen	Crevier/Martin	1:09.04
2012	Amazombie	Mike E. Smith	William Spawr	Sanford/Spawr	1:08.65
2011	Euroears	Rafael Bejarano	Bob Baffert	James and Marilyn Helzer	1:08.17
2010	Smiling Tiger	Victor Espinoza	Jeffrey L. Bonde	Alan Klein/Phil Lebherz	1:09.21
2009	Zensational	Victor Espinoza	Bob Baffert	Zayat Stables	1:08.57
2008	Street Boss	David Flores	Bruce Headley	Headley/Naify/Yu	1:08.67
2007	In Summation	Corey Nakatani	Christophe Clement	Waterford Stable	1:11.06
2006	Pure as Gold	Jon K. Court	Jack Carava	La Canada Stable	1:08.79
2005	Greg's Gold	David R. Flores	David Hofmans	William R. Boswell	1:08.04
2004	Kela	Tyler Baze	Mike R. Mitchell	Jay Manoogian	1:08.51
2003	Beau's Town	Pat Valenzuela	Cole Norman	David Hulkewicz	1:07.96
2002	Disturbingthepeace	Victor Espinoza	Darrell Vienna	David & Rita Milch	1:09.21
2001	Kona Gold	Alex Solis	Bruce Headley	Headley & Molasky	1:08.22
2000	Kona Gold	Alex Solis	Bruce Headley	Headley & Molasky	1:08.50
1999	Christmas Boy	Corey Nakatani	John W. Sadler	Opas & Sinatra	1:08.11
1998	Son of a Pistol	Alex Solis	Bruce Headley	Luis Asistio et al.	1:08.10
1997	First Intent	René R. Douglas	Jack Carava	Lima Family Trust	1:08.80
1996	Lit De Justice	Corey Nakatani	Jenine Sahadi	Evergreen Farm	1:08.19
1995	Gold Land	Ed Delahoussaye	Neil Drysdale	Prince Fahd Salman	1:08.07
1994	King's Blade	Corey Nakatani	Richard Mandella	Gamel & Kinerk	1:08.64
1993	The Wicked North	Corey Black	David Bernstein	Philip Hersh	1:08.52
1992	Thirty Slews	Ed Delahoussaye	Bob Baffert	Degroot & Dutch Masters III	1:08.20
1991	Bruho	Corey Nakatani	Jerry M. Fanning	J. M. Scardino	1:08.25
1990	Sensational Star	Rafael Meza	William Spawr	Calhoun-Risoldi-Sullivan	1:08.00
1989	On The Line	Gary Stevens	D. Wayne Lukas	Eugene V. Klein	1:08.00
1988	Olympic Prospect	Alex Solis	John W. Sadler	Alsdorf, Opas & Sinatra	1:08.80
1987	Zany Tactics	Jack Kaenel	Blake R. Heap	Vera C. Brunette	1:09.00
1986	American Legion	Ed Delahoussaye	D. Wayne Lukas	Melvin E. Hatley	1:08.20
1985	My Favorite Moment	Ed Delahoussaye	Warren Stute	William L. Conner	1:09.80
1984	Night Mover	Luis Ortega	Robert J. Frankel	Jerry & Ann Moss	1:08.60
1983	Chinook Pass	Laffit Pincay Jr.	Laurie N. Anderson	Hi-Yu Stable	1:08.60
1982	Pencil Point	Chris McCarron	Neil French	De Benedetti & Duffel	1:09.00
1981	Syncopate	Ed Delahoussaye	Ron McAnally	Elmendorf Farm	1:08.60
1980	Reb's Golden Ale	Sandy Hawley	Jerry M. Fanning	3 Plus U Stable	1:08.80
1979	Syncopate	Sandy Hawley	Ron McAnally	Elmendorf Farm	1:08.40
1978	Bad'n Big	Bill Shoemaker	Richard Mandella	Dr/M. B. Wynne Jr.	1:07.80
1977	Cherry River	Laffit Pincay Jr.	Douglas R. Oliver	Douglas R. Oliver	1:08.40
1976	Cherry River	Laffit Pincay Jr.	Douglas R. Oliver	Douglas R. Oliver	1:09.40
1975	Messenger of Song	Jerry Lambert	Gordon C. Campbell	Bernard J. Ridder	1:08.80
1974	Rise High	Jorge Tejeira	Larry Rose	Sidney Factor	1:09.00
1973	Pataha Prince	Bill Shoemaker	Robert J. Frankel	M. R. Frankel	1:08.00
1972	Dominant Star	Fernando Alvarez	Cecil Jolly	V. H. Winchell Jr.	1:08.80
1971	Haveago	Johnny Sellers	Tommy Doyle	George Franklin Getty II	1:08.20
1970	Bargain Day	Rudy Rosales	Charles Whittingham	Forked Lightning Ranch	1:27.60
1969	Kissin' George	William T. Mahorney	Buster Millerick	DeCourcy Graham	1:07.80
1968	Pretense	Donald Pierce	Charles Whittingham	Llangollen Farm	1:07.80
1967	Kissin' George	William T. Mahorney	Buster Millerick	DeCourcy Graham	1:08.60
1966	Chiclero	Donald Pierce	Bob R. Roberts	Bingman & Gheen	1:08.80
1965	Viking Spirit	Kenneth Church	James I. Nazworthy	Thomas E. Brittingham III	1:08.60
1964	Soldier Girl	Johnny Longden	Charles A. Comiskey	M/M J. Tusquellas	1:09.40
1963	Sledge	Miguel Yanez	Willis A. Reavis	Dee Dee Stable	1:08.60
1962	Sea Orbit	Raymond York	John M. Leavitt	Wonder Y Ranch	1:08.80
1962	Crazy Kid	Angel Valenzuela	John G. Canty	Vista Hermosa Stable	1:07.80
1961	Ann's Knight	Robert Mundorf	Farrell W. Jones	M/M S. N. Simmons	1:08.60
1960	High Performance	Rudy Campas	Edward E. Presnell	M/M Maurice H. Robineau	1:09.00
1959	Ole Fols	Ismael Valenzuela	William B. Finnegan	Neil S. McCarthy	1:08.80
1958	How Now	Willie Harmatz	Cecil Jolly	George C. Newell	1:09.40
1957	How Now	Raymond York	Cecil Jolly	George C. Newell	1:09.20
1956	Colonel Mack	Ralph Neves	Sam Brunson	A C T Stock Farm	1:08.80
1955	One Ton Tony	Pete Moreno	Cecel Wihelm	W-L Ranch Co.	1:09.20
1954	Alibhai Lynn	Joe Phillippi	Richard D. Moon	G. I. Martin	1:09.60
1953	Ode	Raymond York	Richard D. Moon	G. I. Martin	1:10.20
1952	Gustaf	Willie Marsh	William W. Morris	Mrs C. C. Cate	1:10.00
1951	Blue Reading	Bill Pearson	Red McDaniel	M/M Clement L. Hirsch	1:10.40
1950	Imprerium	Bill Shoemaker	William B. Finnegan	Delman & Finnegan	1:09.80
1949	Cover Up	Merlin Volzke	Bob R. Roberts	Z T Addington	1:10.00
1948	Prevaricator	Jose Bravo	William Molter	E. O. Stice & Sons	1:10.20
1947	Be Fearless	Lester Balaski	R. Lyall	Cuadra Coahuila	1:10.80
1946	War Allies *	Ralph Neves	Hack Ross	L. J. Montgomery	1:11.40
1946	Indian Watch *	Melvin Peterson	Harry Dunster	Rancho Ojo Agua	1:11.40

*1946: Dead Heat
