= Elizabeth Dobson Altemus =

American socialite

Elizabeth Altemus Eastman
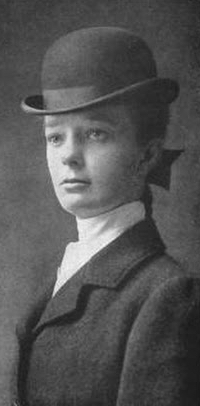
- Bessie Dobson Altemus, in riding gear, from a 1903 publication.
- Born: Elizabeth Dobson; February 7, 1874; Pennsylvania
- Died: August 4, 1947 (aged 73); Philadelphia, Pennsylvania
- Other names: Elizabeth Dobson Altemus Eastman, Bessie Dobson Altemus
- Occupations: Socialite, political organizer, clubwoman

Elizabeth Altemus Eastman (née Dobson; February 7, 1874 – August 4, 1947) was a Philadelphia socialite and political organizer, "an effective influence for progress and betterment in the civic, social, and political affairs of Philadelphia."

== Early life ==
Elizabeth "Bessie" Dobson was born in Pennsylvania, the daughter of English-born parents, James Dobson and Mary Ann (Schofield) Dobson. Her father owned a textile mill, Dobson Mills, now known as a national historic site. As a young woman she was "renowned for her wonderful gowns and her marvelous hats and for her daring as a horsewoman."

== Career ==
Bessie Dobson Altemus was president of the Women's Board of the Jefferson Medical College Hospital for 23 years; "there is no part of the hospital proper that does not bear the imprint of her work and of her personality," commented one colleague in 1948. During World War I, she was active in American Red Cross work, organizing the preparation of surgical materials by the Women's Board of Jefferson Medical College Hospital. She worked to build a rooftop garden for patients in the chest unit at Jefferson Medical College Hospital, and during World War II she arranged "practical gifts" for all the nurses leaving for overseas service. She also organized a knitting group to make scarves and socks for servicemen.

Dobson was president of the Pennsylvania Council of Republican Women, elected in 1925. "Men did not want us to get the vote," she told an audience in 1923, "and now that we have it they are watching us closely. It is up to us to make good. The women have never fallen down in anything they have undertaken, and it is up to them to show what they can do now."

In 1931, she was one of the council's vice presidents, and a member of the finance and publicity committees. She was also president of the Republican Women of Philadelphia, president of the Coolidge Clubs of America, and a member of the Valley Forge Park Commission.

== Bella Vista ==
During the Great Depression, Altemus and her son opened five acres of the Dobson estate on the Schuylkill River, called Bella Vista, for vegetable gardens. During World War II the federal government took over the North Philadelphia property, evicted Altemus, and built housing for war workers on the site. In 1953, the space was transferred to the Philadelphia Housing Authority for low-income housing, now known as Abbottsford Homes. The mansion's books were donated to the Free Library of Philadelphia, the furnishings to the Falls of the Schuylkill Presbyterian Church and the Philadelphia Museum of Art.

== Personal life ==
Elizabeth Dobson married a businessman, Lemuel Coffin Altemus, in 1901. Lemuel Altemus declared bankruptcy in 1908, and the couple divorced shortly thereafter in 1911. She had a son, James Dobson Altemus (1901–1966), who became an inventor, and a daughter, Mary Elizabeth (1906–1988), who became a horsebreeder known as Liz Whitney Tippett. She remarried, to a Marine Corps officer from Georgia, Nedom Angier Eastman, in 1924. In 1933, a woman named Estelle Maxwell sued her and her son for working to prevent the remarriage of Lemuel Coffin Altemus. The lawsuit was dismissed.

Elizabeth Altemus Eastman was widowed when her second husband died in 1935. She died in 1947, aged 73, in Philadelphia. There was a Bessie Dobson Altemus Memorial Prize given by the School of Nursing at Thomas Jefferson University, from 1948 to 1981.
