= Bob Black Jack =

American-bred Thoroughbred racehorse

- Sire: Stormy Jack
- Grandsire: Bertrando
- Dam: Molly's Prospector
- Damsire: Native Prospector
- Sex: Stallion
- Foaled: 2005
- Country: United States
- Color: Bay
- Breeder: Gary Howard, Marlene Howard and Bruce Dunmore
- Owner: Jeff Harmon & Tim Kasparoff
- Trainer: James Kasparoff
- Record: 11: 5-2-1
- Earnings: US$684,925

Major wins
- California Breeders' Champion Stakes (2007); Sunshine Millions Dash (2008); Malibu Stakes (2008); San Carlos Handicap (2010)

Bob Black Jack is a California-bred colt by Stormy Jack (a son of Bertrando), out of the mare Molly's Prospector. He holds the Santa Anita Racetrack track records for 6 and 7 furlongs. His earnings amount to over 300 times his sale price of $4,500.

Bob Black Jack was the pace setter in the 2008 Kentucky Derby and finished second in the Santa Anita Derby behind Colonel John.

In the Grade I Malibu Stakes, he surpassed the record time set by Spectacular Bid in 1980.

After a 14-month layoff, the lightly raced Bob Black Jack came back to wire the field in the San Carlos Handicap by 2 and 1/2 lengths over the favored 2009 Breeders' Cup Sprint winner, Dancing in Silks.
