= Sunshine Millions Dash =

Thoroughbred horse race

The Sunshine Millions Dash is an American race for thoroughbred horses held in January as part of the eight-race Sunshine Millions series. Run at Santa Anita Park in Arcadia, California or at Gulfstream Park in Hallandale Beach, Florida. Half the eight races of the Sunshine Millions series are run at one track and half at the other.

Open to three-year-olds willing to race six furlongs on the dirt, the Dash is an ungraded stakes event but carries a purse of $250,000. This race is also known as the Ocala Stud Dash Stakes.

The Sunshine Millions series of races are restricted to horses bred either in Florida or in California and is the brainchild of the Thoroughbred Owners of California, the California Thoroughbred Breeders Association, the Florida Thoroughbred Breeders' and Owners' Association, Inc., Santa Anita Park, Gulfstream Park, and Magna Entertainment Corp.

== Winners ==
Year	Winner	Bred	Jockey	Trainer	Owner	Time
2009	This Ones for Phil	FL	Edgar Prado	Richard E. Dutrow, Jr.	Paul Pompa, Jr.	1:09.10
2008	Bob Black Jack	CA	David Flores	James Kasparoff	Harmon/Kasparoff	1:06.53
2007	Storm in May	FL	Manoel R. Cruz	William A. Kaplan	Teresa & David Palmer	1:10.22
2006	Da Stoops	CA	Victor Espinoza	Bob Baffert	Watson & Weitman Performances	1:08.94
2005	Lost in the Fog	FL	Russell Baze	Greg Gilchrist	Harry J. Aleo	1:09.96
2004	Saint Afleet	FL	Kent Desormeaux	Craig Dollase	Ron Waranch	1:08.68
2003	Valid Video	FL	Edgar Prado	Dennis J. Manning	Mack Fehsenfeld	1:22.38
