= Ralph Neves =

American jockey

Ralph P. Neves
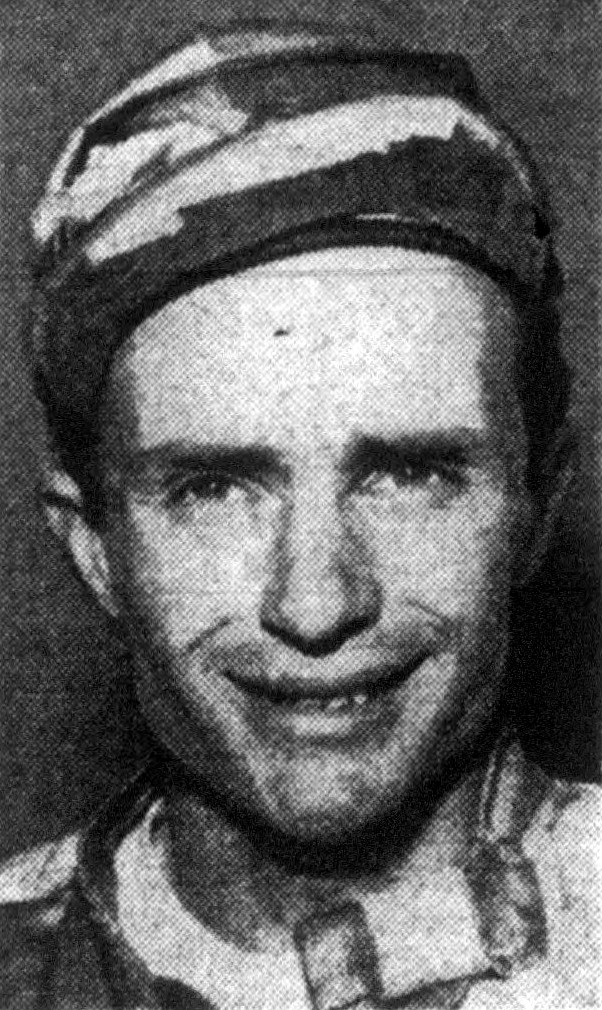
- Neves, circa 1953

Personal information
- Born: August 26, 1916 Cape Cod, Massachusetts, United States
- Died: July 7, 1995 (aged 78)
- Occupation: Jockey

Horse racing career
- Sport: Horse racing
- Career wins: 3,772

Major racing wins
- Sunset Handicap (1939, 1954, 1957); Santa Anita Derby (1940); San Felipe Stakes (1940, 1946); San Carlos Handicap (1941, 1957); Arlington Matron Handicap (1942); California Breeders' Champion Stakes (1946, 1950, 1951, 1952); Santa Margarita Handicap (1947); Santa Maria Handicap (1947); Del Mar Handicap (1949); Hollywood Gold Cup (1949); San Pasqual Handicap (1949, 1950, 1953); Santa Barbara Handicap (1953); Hollywood Derby (1953, 1954, 1962); Las Flores Handicap (1955); Palos Verdes Handicap (1955); Los Angeles Handicap (1956, 1960); Strub Stakes (1956); Blue Grass Stakes (1957); Santa Anita Handicap (1957); San Vicente Stakes (1958); San Juan Capistrano Handicap (1959); Graduation Stakes (1960, 1963); San Marcos Stakes (1960); Malibu Stakes (1962) International wins: Handicap de las Americas (1945)

Racing awards
- George Woolf Memorial Jockey Award (1954)

Honours
- United States Racing Hall of Fame (1960); Washington Racing Hall of Fame (2003)

Significant horses
- Native Diver, Corn Husker, Round Table
- Updated on April 22, 2020

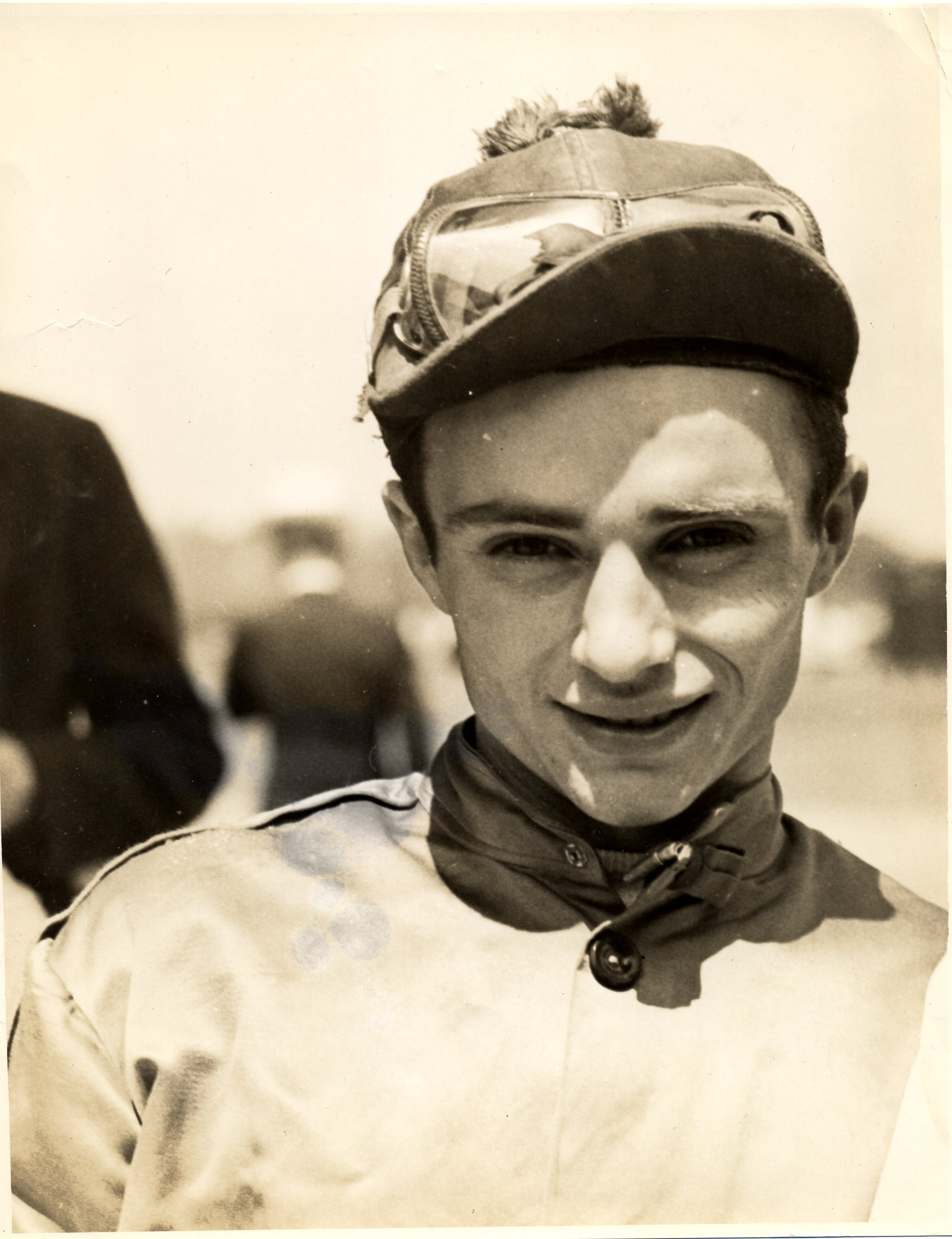
Ralph Neves, ca. 1940.

Ralph P. Neves (August 26, 1916 – July 7, 1995) was an American Hall of Fame jockey in Thoroughbred horse racing. Born in Cape Cod, Massachusetts, Neves won 3,772 races, including 173 stakes, and was elected to the Racing Hall of Fame in 1960. His long career was interrupted only by several injuries and service in the United States Army Cavalry during World War II; a serious back injury suffered in the war bothered him during the rest of his career. He retired in 1964.

In the early part of his career Neves rode at Santa Anita Park and Longacres Racetrack. By the mid-1930s, he was considered one of the top west coast riders, known for his cocky self-confidence.

== Death and "resurrection" ==
He is best known for an incident at Bay Meadows Racetrack in San Mateo, California on May 8, 1936. After being thrown from his horse, Flannikins (another newspaper account says it was Lady Valorous in the third race), he was pronounced dead due to heart failure after a hasty examination and sent to the local hospital, where the track physician administered a shot of adrenaline to the heart. Neves made it back to the racetrack and demanded to be allowed to ride the rest of his mounts that day (he was not permitted to do so until the next day).

The story has been told many times since, familiar to many jockeys, and as a result has gathered a number of variations. Two different doctors have been said to have given the key injection in two different places, and even Neves' Hall of Fame plaque states incorrectly that he won five races the following day. Instead, Neves would go on to ride four winning horses on May 14. The incident was covered extensively in local newspapers at the time; the San Francisco Examiner is particularly remembered for the headline "Neves, Called Dead in Fall, Denies It."

After his fall, new safety regulations were instituted. Nevertheless, Neves suffered several more injuries in falls, including vision problems, and required brain surgery in 1959. Still known for his individualistic style, he was suspended frequently throughout his career, including a five-day suspension for "careless riding" in 1961, after his Hall of Fame induction.

Among his other accomplishments, Ralph Neves rode six winners on October 24, 1961 at Bay Meadows Racetrack. In 1954 he was voted the George Woolf Memorial Jockey Award. In addition to his induction in the National Museum of Racing and Hall of Fame, he was elected to the Washington Racing Hall of Fame.

At the time of his retirement in mid-1963 he was one of only eight riders with at least 3000 wins.

Ralph Neves was living in San Marcos, California at the time of his death in 1995. He was survived by his ex-wife, Midge Neves, and their three children, Gary, Craig, and Cathy.

== See also ==
- List of premature obituaries
