= Larson Family Winery =

Coordinates: 38°16′51″N 122°25′1″W

- Location: Sonoma, California, USA
- Appellation: Los Carneros AVA
- Formerly: Sonoma Creek Winery
- Other labels: Millerick Road
- Founded: 1987
- First vintage: 1988
- Key people: Bob Larson, Tom Larson, Becky Larson
- Cases/yr: 3,500
- Varietals: Chardonnay, Pinot grigio, Gewurztraminer, Pinot noir, Cabernet Sauvignon
- Other products: Meritage
- Distribution: national
- Tasting: open to the public
- Website: www.larsonfamilywinery.com

Larson Family Winery is a winery on Sonoma Creek in the Los Carneros AVA of Sonoma County.

== History ==
The site of the winery in the Schellville region of Sonoma Valley was first a ranch, then later the site of the Sonoma Rodeo. The land has been in the family for generations and is where notable horse trainer Buster Millerick who worked with Seabiscuit learned to ride.

== Winery ==
Larson Family Winery has produced many award winning wines. A few of these include their 2008 Late Harvest Carneros Gewürtztraminer, which won gold in the 2011 SF Chronicle Wine Competition, and the 2009 Pinot noir Rose won 90 points and a Silver Medal at the California State Fair and the 2008 Late Harvest Carneros Gewürztraminer won gold in the 2011 SF Chronicle Wine Competition.
