= Disturbingthepeace =

American-bred Thoroughbred racehorse

- Sire: Bold Badgett
- Grandsire: Damascus
- Dam: Regal Riot
- Damsire: Sovereign Dancer
- Sex: Gelding
- Foaled: 1998
- Country: United States
- Colour: Bay
- Breeder: Buddy Johnston
- Owner: Rita & David Milch & Herrick Racing
- Trainer: Darrell Vienna
- Record: 24: 8-4-4
- Earnings: $666,020

Major wins
- Pat O'Brien Handicap (2002, 2003); Bing Crosby Breeders' Cup Handicap (2002); Triple Bend Handicap (2002)

Disturbingthepeace (foaled 1998 in California) is a retired American Thoroughbred racehorse.

== Background ==
Disturbingthepeace was bred by Buddy Johnston, the owner of Old English Rancho in Sanger, California. He was purchased by David Milch and his wife Rita as in May 2001. At the 2002 Fasig-Tipton November select sale, Bill and Donna Herrick, who race under the name Herrick Racing, acquired an interest in Disturbingthepeace. He was trained by Darrell Vienna.

== Racing career ==
After losing his first two starts in 2002, the gelding won six straight races. He then went winless in his next six races including a seventh-place finish in the 2002 Breeders' Cup Sprint at Chicago's Arlington Park Racetrack. On August 17, 2003, Disturbingthepeace snapped his losing streak at Del Mar Racetrack when he became the first two-time winner in the history of the Pat O'Brien Handicap. He was then sidelined for nearly a year with a sesamoid injury and did not return to racing until July 25, 2004 when he finished ninth in the Bing Crosby Breeders' Cup Handicap. In his next and last start on August 25, Disturbingthepeace finished fourth in an allowance/optional claiming race at Del Mar Racetrack.

He was retired in 2004. He currently resides at Old Friends Equine Retirement Farm.
