= Buster Millerick =

American racehorse trainer (1905 – 1986)

Personal information
- Born: November 30, 1905 Petaluma, California, United States
- Died: September 30, 1986 (aged 80) Arcadia, California, United States
- Occupation: Trainer

Horse racing career
- Sport: Horse racing

Major racing wins
- California Breeders' Champion Stakes (1940); Jamaica Handicap (1946); Del Mar Handicap (1948, 1950, 1967); Palos Verdes Handicap (1955, 1964, 1965); Hollywood Derby (1956); Malibu Stakes (1962, 1971); Inglewood Handicap (1963, 1964, 1966); San Diego Handicap (1963, 1964, 1965, 1969); San Francisco Mile Handicap (1963, 1967); American Handicap (1965); Hollywood Gold Cup (1965, 1966, 1967); Los Angeles Handicap (1965, 1967, 1968, 1983); San Carlos Handicap (1965, 1967); San Pasqual Handicap (1966); San Bernardino Handicap (1966); Bing Crosby Handicap (1967, 1969); Del Mar Debutante Stakes (1967); Del Mar Handicap (1967); Santa Ana Handicap (1968); Sport Page Handicap (1968); Del Mar Futurity (1969); San Fernando Stakes (1969); California Derby (1970); Arcadia Handicap (1972); Baldwin Stakes (1973); La Brea Stakes (1974)

Racing awards
- Leading trainer at Del Mar Racetrack (1967)

Honours
- United States Racing Hall of Fame (2010)

Significant horses
- Kissin' George, Mira Femme, Native Diver

Michael E. "Buster" Millerick (November 30, 1905 – September 30, 1986) was an American Hall of Fame racehorse trainer.

== Early life ==
Michael "Buster" Millerick was born in Petaluma, California. He learned to train horses at his cousin's ranch in Schellville where Larson Family Winery is located today. The Millerick family raised horses, ran the largest rodeo stock line in California and operated a rodeo. Buster's uncles Tom, Jack and George also trained thoroughbred racehorses.

== Career ==
Buster Millerick began working as a professional trainer while in his twenties. Shortly after Santa Anita Park opened in Arcadia, California in 1934, Millerick was hired to condition horses for Charles Howard and would work under head trainer Tom Smith when the stable acquired Seabiscuit in 1936. In 1940, Millerick won his first major race for the Howard stable when Yankee Dandy captured the California Breeders' Champion Stakes.

Buster Millerick avoided the limelight as much as possible. In a July 2005 story on Native Diver, the California Thoroughbred Breeders Association quotes stable owner and Millerick client Louis K. Shapiro as saying that "you never saw him [Millerick] in a winner's circle photograph."

During his career, Buster Millerick trained a number of racehorses including DeCourcy Graham's Kissin' George and Verne Winchell's Champion filly, Mira Femme. He was the trainer of Mr. & Mrs. Louis K. Shapiro's U.S. Racing Hall of Fame inductee, Native Diver. A gelding, Native Diver won thirty-four stakes races from age two through age eight, including a three straight editions of the Hollywood Gold Cup, and was the first California-bred to earn a million dollars in racing.

== Death and legacy ==
After a short illness, Millerick died at age eighty on September 30, 1986, at Methodist Hospital in Arcadia, California.

In 2010, Millerick was voted into the National Museum of Racing and Hall of Fame.
