= Llangollen Farm =

Historic horse and cattle farm in Virginia, United States

Coordinates: 39.029635°N 77.873592°W

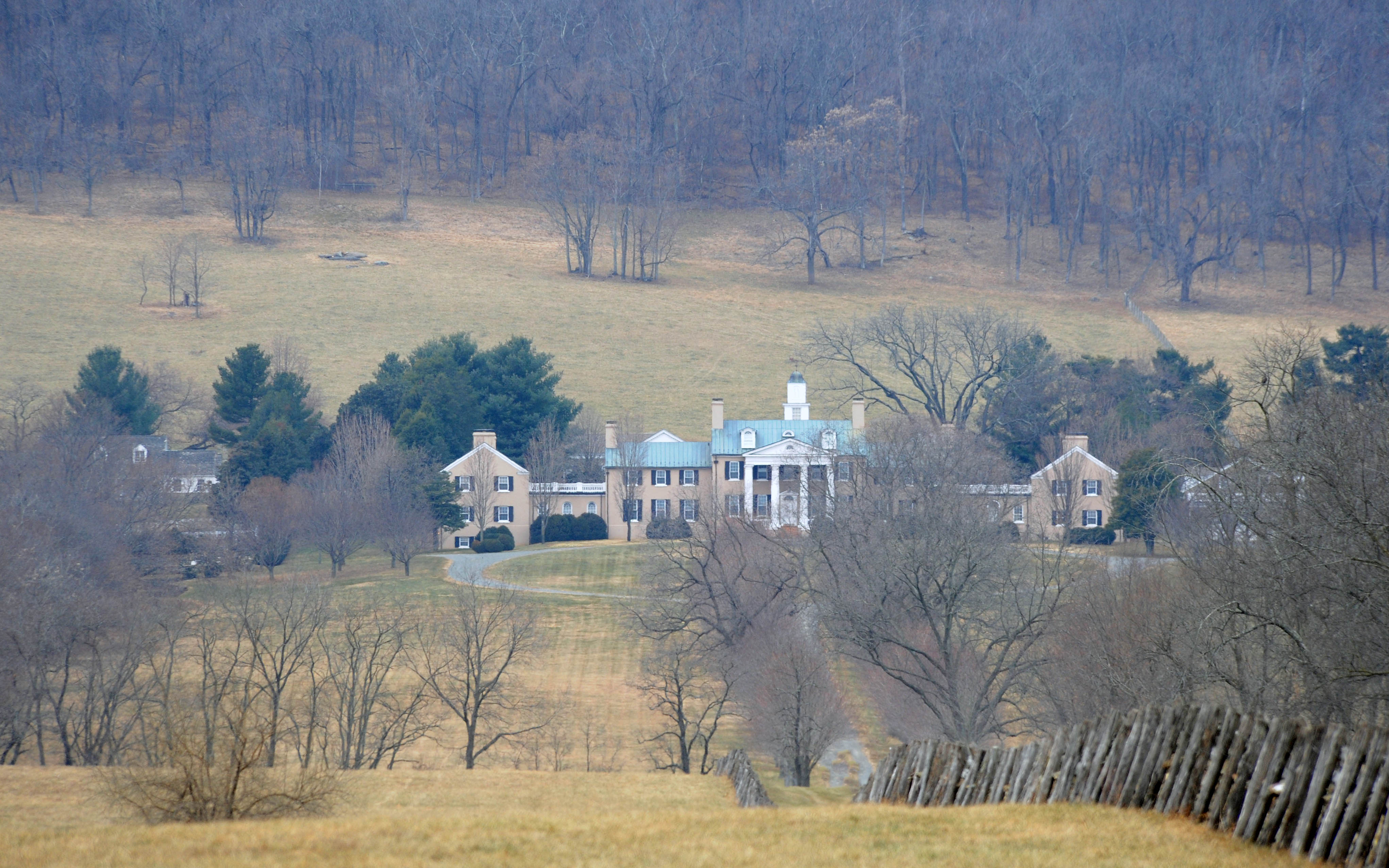
Farm in 2017

Llangollen Farm is an historic horse and cattle farm located in western Loudoun County, Virginia, United States. It sits on Trappe Rd. near Upperville at the foot of the Blue Ridge Mountains. Eight miles (13 km) from the town of Middleburg, the area is home to a number of prominent Thoroughbred-breeding farms and a large country estates. The farm was listed on the National Register of Historic Places in 2017.

== History ==
Llangollen, which takes its name from the Welsh language and historic small Welsh market town of the same name (Llan meaning "Church; a religious settlement; or an enclosure" and Saint Collen, a 7th-century monk who founded a church beside the river), was originally part of a 10,000-acre (40 km^{2}) land grant on which a two-story manor house was built in the late 1770s. Over the years, portions of the Llangollen estate were sold off. In the first part of the 19th century, Congressman Cuthbert Powell owned Llangollen. He died there in 1849. Two of his grandsons died at fighting for the Confederacy at the two battles of Manassas. Another grandson born at Llangollen, Rev. Arthur Gray Sr. (1853–1921) revitalized the Bear Mountain Indian Mission School in Amherst County circa 1908 and died in rural Brunswick County. By 1930, only 2,200 acres (8.90 km^{2}) remained of the Llangollen estate when John Hay "Jock" Whitney purchased it as a wedding gift for his fiancée, Mary Elizabeth "Liz" Altemus.

Involved with show horses from a young age, Liz Whitney spent a great deal of money turning Llangollen into a major breeding and training center for hunt horses as well as for Thoroughbreds for flat racing and steeplechase events. She renovated and expanded the manor house and built tack rooms, six barns, including a large horseshoe-shaped barn, a stud barn and broodmare sheds. She had paddocks and a training track built on the property and eight employee and guest cottages. Under the name "Llangollen Farm", Liz Whitney was successfully involved for many years in the sport of Thoroughbred horse racing. In 1984 1,085.22 acres of property, including the house and barns, was put into permanent protective easement to prevent the estate from ever being broken up and developed.

Liz and Jock Whitney divorced in June 1940 but she retained the estate and lived there for almost six decades until her death in 1988. During her latter years, the elderly Liz Whitney allowed the property to become run down. She died in 1988, and the property was sold in 1989.

=== Recent owners ===
In 1989 the 1,100-acre (4.5 km^{2}) property was bought by Roy L. Ash and his wife, Lila. Mr. and Mrs. Ash undertook a major restoration of the house and the barns. They also instituted a large cow-calf operation raising upward of 300 Angus and Angus-cross cows. They earned wide recognition and received major awards for implementing environmental conservation methods that protected the water on the land through hardened low-water crossings and the creation of acres of riparian buffers that also provided habitat for wildlife.

Approaching his ninetieth birthday, in 2007 Roy Ash sold the Llangollen estate for $22 million to a corporation controlled by American businessman Donald P. Brennan and his wife, Patricia. Daughter Maureen, bringing the sport of polo to the estate and filling the pastures and fields once again with horses, formed the VIPolo Club training facility at Llangollen. Three polo fields were created including one polo field designed for public viewing where games were played during the summer. Further improvements to the property and house were made during the Brennans ownership. In 2017 the property was added to the National Register of Historic Places.

In September 2019, the 1, 085 acre property was put up for sale for $34 million. The sales price was reduced to $29 million in January 2020 and then later dropped to $27.5 million. In January 2022 the listing for the house was withdrawn.
