= James Kasparoff =

American horse trainer

Personal information
- Born: January 9, 1974 (age 52)
- Occupation: Racehorse trainer

Horse racing career
- Sport: Horse racing

Major racing wins
- California Breeders' Champion Stakes (2007); Malibu Stakes (2008); Sunshine Millions Dash (2008); San Carlos Stakes (2010); Moccasin Stakes (2011)

Significant horses
- Bob Black Jack
- Updated on October 25, 2020

James M. Kasparoff (born January 9, 1974) is a retired California horse trainer whose premier horse, Bob Black Jack, raced in the 2008 Kentucky Derby. He trains a stable of five horses owned by his brother Tim Kasparoff and Jeff Harmon.

Bob Black Jack won the California Breeders' Champion Stakes as a two-year-old, giving Kasparoff his first career stakes winner, and later set a track record for six furlongs in the Sunshine Millions Dash Stakes at Santa Anita. The horse was the last entry accepted to the 2008 Kentucky Derby. He led the first half of the race before falling back in the pack, ultimately finishing 16th.

Kasparoff blogged about the 2008 Derby for the New York Times.
