= Kissin' George =

American-bred Thoroughbred racehorse

- Sire: Slamruler
- Grandsire: Nasrullah
- Dam: Nothead
- Damsire: Head Play
- Sex: Stallion
- Foaled: 1963
- Country: United States
- Colour: Chestnut
- Breeder: Jim Sinnott & Buster Millerick
- Owner: DeCourcy Graham
- Trainer: Buster Millerick
- Record: 62: 26-15-1
- Earnings: $271,400

Major wins
- Bing Crosby Handicap (1967, 1969); Palos Verdes Handicap (1967); Lakes And Flowers Handicap (1967); Sport Page Handicap (1968); Los Angeles Handicap (1968); Shoemaker Mile Stakes (1968); San Diego Handicap (1969); Governor's Cup Handicap (1969); Olympia Handicap (1969)

Kissin' George (foaled 1963 in California) was an American thoroughbred racehorse, considered one of America's premier sprint horses of the late 1960s. Kissin' George was out of a Head Play mare called Nothead. He was sired by Slamruler, a grandson of Nearco through his son, Nasrullah.

Kissin' George was active for two time periods, 1966-1969 and 1973-74. Although he lost to Dr. Fager on two occasions when stretching beyond his preferred six furlong distance, he was a dominant force at sprint race distances.

== Career statistics ==
- 1966 age 3; 2 starts, won both for earnings of $6,875.
- 1967 age 4; 8 starts winning 7 and coming 2nd once for $65,200.
- 1968 age 5; 12 starts with 6 wins and 3 places for $111,812.
- 1969 age 6; 8 starts with 4 wins and 2 places for $62,650.
- 1973 age 10; 18 starts 2 wins 5 places and 2 shows for $11,480.
- 1974 age 11; 14 starts 5 wins 4 places and 1 show for $13,383.

== See also ==
- List of racehorses
