= Street Boss =

American-bred Thoroughbred racehorse

- Sire: Street Cry
- Grandsire: Machiavellian
- Dam: Blushing Ogygian
- Damsire: Ogygian
- Sex: Stallion
- Foaled: 31 March 2004
- Country: United States
- Colour: Chestnut
- Breeder: Brilliant Stable, Inc
- Owner: Bruce Headley, Marsha Naify, Simon Yu
- Trainer: Bruce Headley
- Jockey: David Flores
- Record: 13: 7–3–1
- Earnings: US$831,800

Major wins
- Los Angeles Handicap (2008); Triple Bend Handicap (2008); Bing Crosby Handicap (2008)

Street Boss (foaled 31 March 2004) is an American Thoroughbred racehorse that won the 2008 Triple Bend Handicap and Bing Crosby Handicap. He stands as a shuttle stallion for Darley Stud, the global breeding operation of Godolphin.

== Background ==
Street Boss was bred in Kentucky and foaled on the 31 March 2004. He was sired by champion sire Street Cry, whose progeny includes over 130 stakes-winners. Street Boss was sold for $300,000 as a yearling at Keeneland in September 2005.

== Racing career ==
On 2 September 2007, Street Boss won on debut at Del Mar as a three-year-old.

As a four-year-old Street Boss went on a winning streak of 5 races in succession, culminating in duel Grade One victories in the Triple Bend and Bing Crosby Handicap's.

Street Boss had his last ever run in the 2008 Breeders' Cup Sprint where he finished third behind Midnight Lute.

== Stud career ==
Street Boss was retired to Darley Stud and has since performed as a shuttle stallion in the United States, Europe, Australia and New Zealand.

=== Notable progeny ===
Street Boss has currently sired 14 Grade/Group One winners:

c = colt, f = filly, g = gelding

Foaled	Name	Sex	Major Wins
2010	Capo Bastone	c	King's Bishop Stakes
2010	The Quarterback	g	Newmarket Handicap
2011	Danza	c	Arkansas Derby
2013	Cathryn Sophia	f	Kentucky Oaks
2013	Decked Out	f	American Oaks
2016	Elite Street	g	Winterbottom Stakes
2017	Fair Maiden	f	La Brea Stakes
2018	Anamoe	c	Sires' Produce Stakes, Caulfield Guineas, Rosehill Guineas, Winx Stakes, George Main Stakes, Caulfield Stakes, W. S. Cox Plate, Chipping Norton Stakes
2018	Pinstriped	g	Memsie Stakes
2019	Another Wil	g	C F Orr Stakes
2019	Pericles	g	Futurity Stakes
2022	Tempted	f	Surround Stakes, The Everest
2022	Tentyris	c	Coolmore Stud Stakes, Black Caviar Lightning
2023	Green Spaces	c	Australian Derby

== Pedigree ==
Pedigree of Street Boss (USA) 2004
Sire Street Cry (IRE) 1998	Machiavellian (USA); 1987	Mr. Prospector	Raise a Native
Sire Street Cry (IRE) 1998	Machiavellian (USA); 1987	Mr. Prospector	Gold Digger
Sire Street Cry (IRE) 1998	Machiavellian (USA); 1987	Coup de Folie	Halo
Sire Street Cry (IRE) 1998	Machiavellian (USA); 1987	Coup de Folie	Raise the Standard
Sire Street Cry (IRE) 1998	Helen Street (GB); 1982	Troy	Petingo
Sire Street Cry (IRE) 1998	Helen Street (GB); 1982	Troy	La Milo
Sire Street Cry (IRE) 1998	Helen Street (GB); 1982	Waterway	Riverman
Sire Street Cry (IRE) 1998	Helen Street (GB); 1982	Waterway	Boulevard
Dam Blushing Ogygian (USA) 1994	Ogygian (USA); 1983	Damascus	Sword Dancer
Dam Blushing Ogygian (USA) 1994	Ogygian (USA); 1983	Damascus	Kerala
Dam Blushing Ogygian (USA) 1994	Ogygian (USA); 1983	Gonfalon	Francis S
Dam Blushing Ogygian (USA) 1994	Ogygian (USA); 1983	Gonfalon	Grand Splendor
Dam Blushing Ogygian (USA) 1994	Fruhlingshochzeit (USA); 1984	Blushing Groom	Red God
Dam Blushing Ogygian (USA) 1994	Fruhlingshochzeit (USA); 1984	Blushing Groom	Runaway Bride
Dam Blushing Ogygian (USA) 1994	Fruhlingshochzeit (USA); 1984	Fruhlingstag	Orsini
Dam Blushing Ogygian (USA) 1994	Fruhlingshochzeit (USA); 1984	Fruhlingstag	Revada
