= Your Host =

American-bred Thoroughbred racehorse

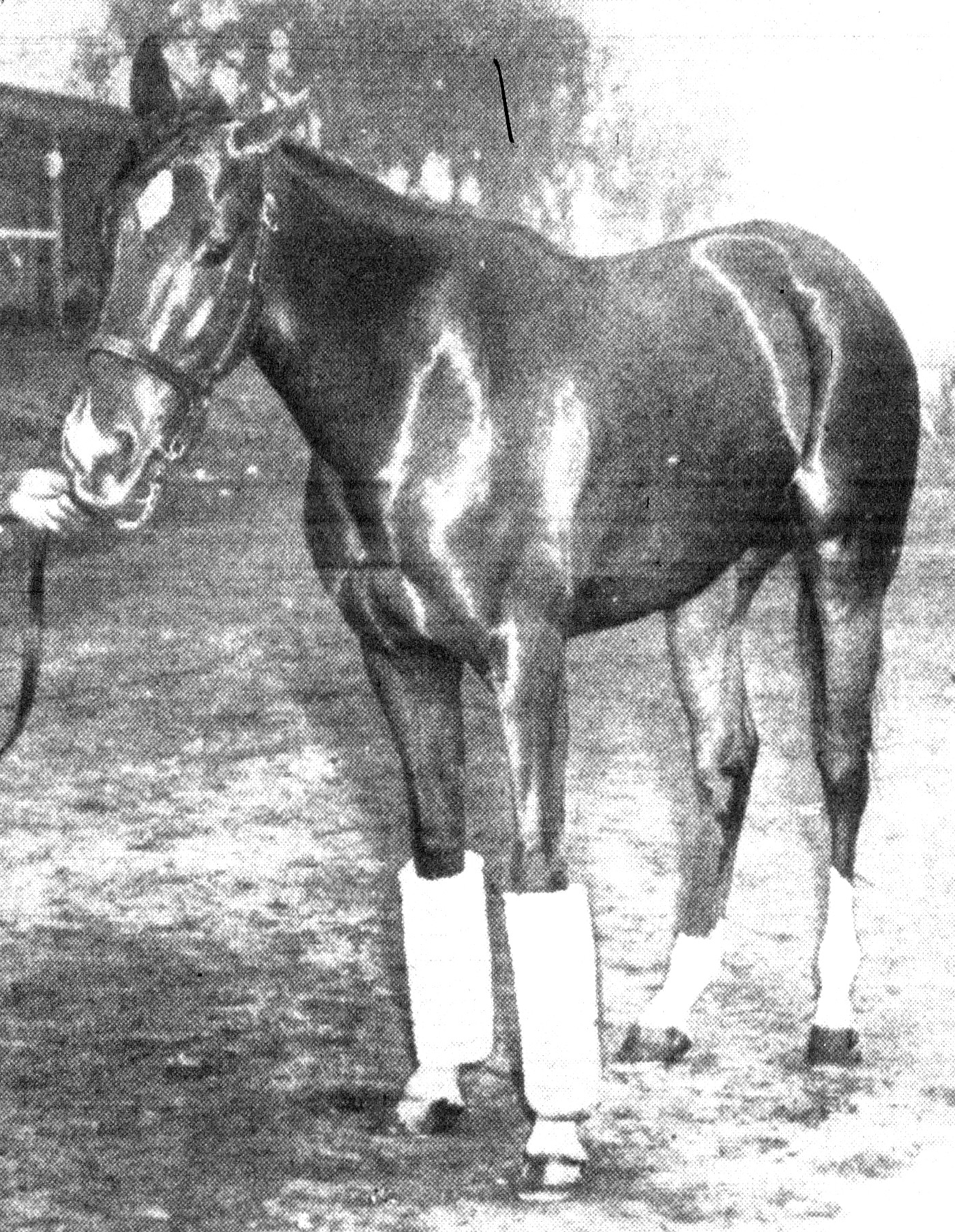
- Your Host in 1950
- Sire: Alibhai
- Grandsire: Hyperion
- Dam: Boudoir
- Damsire: Mahmoud
- Sex: stallion
- Foaled: 1947
- Country: United States
- Colour: Chestnut
- Breeder: Louis B. Mayer
- Owner: William Goetz
- Trainer: Harry L. Daniels
- Record: 23: 13-5-2
- Earnings: $384,795

Major wins
- California Breeders' Champion Stakes (1949); Del Mar Futurity (1949); Forerunner Stakes (1950); Santa Anita Derby (1950); San Felipe Stakes (1950); Thanksgiving Day Handicap (1950); Golden Gate Breeders' Handicap (1950); Kent Stakes (1950); Dick Welles Stakes (1950); Sheridan Handicap (1950); Santa Catalina Handicap (1951)
- Last updated on August 21, 2011

Your Host (1947–1961) was an American Thoroughbred racehorse. Foaled in California, he was by the imported British stallion Alibhai out of the Irish mare Boudoir by the French stallion Mahmoud. Bred in the stables of Louis B. Mayer (head of Metro Goldwyn Mayer), Your Host was owned by Mayer's son-in-law (film producer William Goetz) and trained by Harry L. Daniels. Despite illness and injury, he had a successful racing career, and went on to sire the great gelding Kelso.

== Early life ==
Your Host was foaled with his right eye and ear set higher than his left, a crooked neck, low withers and light flanks. It was said his neck was twisted due to a youthful injury, but his groom claimed he held his head oddly in order to see properly. Your Host was nervous, headstrong and often uncontrollable. A chestnut, he had four white stockings (considered unlucky by some horsemen). At age two, Your Host became seriously ill, and only the skill of his veterinarians and his own will to live saved his life.

== Racing career ==
As a two-year-old, Your Host won the California Breeders' Champion Stakes, the Del Mar Futurity, and finished second in the Salinas Handicap and the Homebred Stakes. At three, he won the San Felipe Stakes and the Santa Anita Derby; he also won a race at Keeneland Race Course by 6 1/2 lengths in track-record time, beating Flamingo Stakes winner Oil Capitol and Blue Grass Stakes winner Mr. Trouble. The horse the press began to call "The Magnificent Cripple" was favored to win the 76th Kentucky Derby in 1950.

Your Host arrived at Churchill Downs with great fanfare. The sign on his Hollywood connections' railroad car read, "1950 Kentucky Derby Winner". Although ridden by Johnny Longden (who was inducted into both the Canadian Horse Racing Hall of Fame and the National Museum of Racing and Hall of Fame), and dueling for a mile with Mr. Trouble, Your Host faded badly. In the second-fastest Derby yet run (timed at 2:01 3/5) he lost to Middleground, finishing an exhausted ninth. He then returned to California and shorter races, where he won the Thanksgiving Day Handicap, the Golden State Breeders' Handicap, the Kent Stakes, the Dick Welles Stakes, and the Sheridan Handicap. He placed in the Premiere Handicap and finished third in the American Derby and the Arlington Classic. As a three-year-old, Your Host defeated eventual Horse of the Year Hill Prince, who had finished second in the Derby. He also defeated Kentucky Derby winner Ponder.

Early in 1951, Your Host's four-year-old season, he finished second to Bolero while conceding five pounds in the San Carlos Handicap and then won the Santa Catalina Stakes under 130 pounds (59 kg). Although during this race Your Host's saddle slipped forward, nearly unseating his rider, he set a new track record of 1:48 1/5 for 1 1/8 miles.

On January 13, entered in the San Pasqual Handicap, Your Host clipped heels with Renown. His jockey, Eric Guerin (who had been having difficulty rating him), rolled clear, but Your Host fell heavily on his right shoulder. His right ulna bone in his foreleg was fractured in four places, and his right shoulder and upper leg were also fractured. The first to get to him was his exercise rider, Tuffy Morlan. Morlan later said, "There he stood, broken and in horrible pain, but his funny cock-eyed head was up, and he whinnied at me, a faint, desperate sound. It was the first time he had ever asked me for help. I knew he needed me then, and I could do nothing but take him by the head and weep. I don't think I ever felt so empty and lost as at that moment."

Vanned off the track, Your Host was expected to die; his veterinarians felt there was no point in prolonging his suffering. The horse was insured by Lloyd's of London, which purchased and managed to save him. Sent to the Circle S Ranch of George Stratton, he was attended by Dr. John Walker, who tried everything to immobilize the injury. In the end, he packed the horse in sand to keep him steady. Your Host eventually recovered; however, his right foreleg healed shorter than his left. Your Host ran in 23 races, won 13 times, placed 5 times, and came in third twice. In his lifetime, he won $384,795.

== Stud record ==
Lloyd's of London sent Your Host to stud, where he quickly became a successful sire; in his first California crops, he sired stakes winners Miss Todd, Social Climber and Blen Host. He also produced Windy Sands, who in turn sired Crystal Water. Later, he stood at Meadow View Farms in New Jersey where he sired Kelso, out of Maid of Flight (daughter of Count Fleet and granddaughter of Man o' War). Kelso was five times American Horse of the Year and was rated #4 in the Blood-Horse magazine List of the Top 100 Racehorses of the 20th Century.

Your Host died in 1961, aged fifteen.

== Sire line tree ==
- Your Host
  - Blen Host
  - Social Climber
  - Kelso
  - Windy Sands
    - Crystal Water

== See also ==
- List of racehorses
