= Zensational =

American-bred Thoroughbred racehorse

- Sire: Unbridled's Song
- Grandsire: Unbridled
- Dam: Joke
- Damsire: Phone Trick
- Sex: Colt
- Foaled: 2006
- Country: United States
- Colour: Roan
- Breeder: Claiborne Farm
- Owner: Zayat Stables LLC
- Trainer: Bob Baffert
- Record: 8: 5-1-0
- Earnings: $669,300

Major wins
- Triple Bend Invitational Handicap (2009); Bing Crosby Handicap (2009); Pat O'Brien Handicap (2009)
- Last updated on October 12, 2009

Zensational (foaled April 26, 2006) is an American Thoroughbred racehorse best known for his performances over sprint distances.

== Background ==
Zensational is a gray or roan colt, bred in Kentucky. He was sired by Unbridled's Song out of the Phone Trick mare Joke. Like her son, Joke was also a speedster, winning the Vallejo Stakes. Zensational's dam Joke was a stakes winner and she is a half-sister to the stakes winners Trip (Lord at War) and Laity (Pulpit).

A $700,000 yearling purchase at the Fasig-Tipton Florida select sale of 2-year-olds in training in 2008, Zensational was bred by Claiborne Farm in Kentucky.

== Racing career ==
Owned by Zayat Stables, trained by Bob Baffert and ridden by Garrett K. Gomez, the Roan almost Gray Colt swept all three major sprints in Southern California in the summer of 2009, beating older horses in the Triple Bend Handicap, then in the Bing Crosby Handicap and the Pat O'Brien Handicap. The victory in the Pat O'Brien Handicap earned Zensational a spot in the BC Sprint on Nov. 7 at Santa Anita's Oak Tree meeting through the Win and You're In.

== 2009 Breeders Cup Sprint ==
Zensational faced a heavy field of sprint horses at their best in the $2 million Sentient Jet Breeders' Cup Sprint at the Oak Tree Meeting at Santa Anita Park. The field included Kentucky Cup Sprint winner, El Brujo, Forego Handicap winner Pyro and winner of the 2009 Ancient Title Stakes going 6 furlongs, Gayego.

Retired following an unplaced finish in the 2009 Breeders' Cup Sprint. Zensational Entered stud in 2010 at Hill 'N' Dale Farms, Lexington KY.
