= Pat O'Brien Stakes =

- Class: Grade II
- Location: Del Mar Racetrack; Del Mar, California, United States
- Inaugurated: Initial – 1980; Renewed – 1986
- Race type: Thoroughbred – Flat racing
- Website: Del Mar

Race information
- Distance: 7 furlongs
- Surface: Dirt
- Track: left-handed
- Qualification: Three-years-old & older
- Weight: Base weights with allowances: 4-year-olds and up: 125 lbs. 3-year-olds: 122 lbs.
- Purse: $250,000 (2022)
- Bonuses: Breeders' Cup "Win And You're In" to the Breeders' Cup Dirt Mile

The Pat O'Brien Stakes is a Grade II American Thoroughbred horse race for three-year-olds and older over a distance of seven furlongs on the dirt track scheduled annually in August at Del Mar Racetrack in Del Mar, California. The event currently carries a purse of $250,000.

== History ==
The race was named in honor of actor and Del Mar Racetrack co-founder, Pat O'Brien (1899–1983). Pat O'Brien, a classic character movie actor who often appeared in a James Cagney starring vehicle, loved the races.

The inaugural running of the event was on 25 September 1980, the twelfth and final day of the Del Mar Fair meeting. The event was for two-year-olds, over a distance of 7 1/2 furlongs on the turf track and was won by Elmendorf Farm's Seafood in a time of 1:30 2/5. The following year the L.A. County Fair was moved to Pomona Fairgrounds and the event was idle.

In 1986 the administration of Del Mar renewed the event during their summer meeting as a sprint handicap over seven furlongs on the dirt.

Between 1990–1995 and 2004–2006 the race had Breeders' Cup incentives which were reflected in the name of the event.

The event was classified a Grade III event in 1994 and upgraded to Grade II in 1999. In 2009 the event became a Grade I and after three runnings it was downgraded back to a Grade II stakes.

Of the notable winners of the event are Lit de Justice who won in 1995 in stakes record time, the following year he won the Breeders' Cup Sprint. The 1996 winner Alphabet Soup used the sprint event in his campaign which led to a victory in the Breeders' Cup Classic. The 2014 winner Goldencents went on to win his second Breeders' Cup Dirt Mile.

== Records ==
Speed record:

- 7 furlongs (dirt): 1:20.06 – Lit de Justice (1995)
- 7 furlongs (Polytrack): 1:20.99 – Goldencents (2014)

Margins:

- 12 1/2 lengths – Catalina Cruiser (2018)

Most wins:

- 2 – Catalina Cruiser (2018, 2019)
- 2 – Disturbingthepeace (2002, 2003)

Most wins by a jockey:

- 6 – Victor Espinoza (2001, 2002, 2003, 2005, 2007, 2009)

Most wins by a trainer:

- 8 – Bob Baffert (2000, 2001, 2009, 2010, 2011, 2012, 2013, 2022)

Most wins by an owner:

- 2 – Hronis Racing (2018, 2019)
- 2 – Rita & David Milch (2002, 2003)

== Winners ==
Year	Winner	Age	Jockey	Trainer	Owner	Distance	Time	Purse	Grade	Ref
Pat O'Brien Stakes
2026	Iron Man Cal	4	Joel Rosario	Philip D'Amato	Little Red Feather Racing and Madaket Stables	7 furlongs	1:22.02	$250,000	II	
2025	Dr. Venkman	5	Umberto Rispoli	Mark Glatt	Alipony Racing, Dan J. Agnew, Clint Bunch & James Hailey	7 furlongs	1:21.53	$250,500	II	
2024	Raging Torrent	3	Antonio Fresu	Doug F. O'Neill	Great Friends Stables & Mark Davis	7 furlongs	1:21.17	$251,500	II	
2023	Anarchist	4	Ramon Vazquez	Doug F. O'Neill	Ilium Stables	7 furlongs	1:23.21	$250,000	II	
2022	Laurel River	4	Juan J. Hernandez	Bob Baffert	Juddmonte	7 furlongs	1:21.37	$250,000	II	
2021	Ginobli	4	Drayden Van Dyke	Richard Baltas	Slam Dunk Racing et al.	7 furlongs	1:22.36	$200,000	II	
2020	C Z Rocket	6	Flavien Prat	Peter L. Miller	Tom Kagele	7 furlongs	1:22.25	$151,000	II	
2019	Catalina Cruiser	5	Flavien Prat	John W. Sadler	Hronis Racing	7 furlongs	1:22.00	$200,351	II	
2018	Catalina Cruiser	4	Drayden Van Dyke	John W. Sadler	Hronis Racing	7 furlongs	1:22.13	$196,000	II	
2017	Giant Expectations	4	Gary L. Stevens	Peter Eurton	Border Racing & Gatto Racing	7 furlongs	1:21.08	$201,725	II	
2016	Masochistic	6	Tyler Baze	Ronald W. Ellis	Los Pollos Hermanos Racing & Jay Em Ess Stable	7 furlongs	1:20.31	$184,000	II	
2015	Appealing Tale	5	Joseph Talamo	Peter L. Miller	Cecil & Gary Barber	7 furlongs	1:21.40	$245,000	II	
2014	Goldencents	4	Rafael Bejarano	Doug F. O'Neill	W. C. Racing	7 furlongs	1:20.99	$250,500	II	
2013	Fed Biz	4	Martin Garcia	Bob Baffert	Kaleem Shah	7 furlongs	1:21.12	$251,750	II	
2012	Capital Account	5	David R. Flores	Bob Baffert	Thoroughbred Legends Racing Stable	7 furlongs	1:21.56	$250,000	II	
2011	The Factor	3	Martin Garcia	Bob Baffert	George Bolton & Fog City Stable	7 furlongs	1:21.56	$250,000	I	
2010	El Brujo	4	Joel Rosario	Bob Baffert	Arnold Zetcher	7 furlongs	1:21.70	$298,000	I	
2009	Zensational	3	Victor Espinoza	Bob Baffert	Zayat Stables	7 furlongs	1:22.31	$300,000	I	
Pat O'Brien Handicap
2008	Lewis Michael	5	René R. Douglas	Wayne M. Catalano	Frank C. Calabrese	7 furlongs	1:21.17	$297,500	II	
2007	Greg's Gold	6	Victor Espinoza	David E. Hofmans	Bill Boswell	7 furlongs	1:23.95	$306,000	II	
2006	Siren Lure	5	Alex O. Solis	Art Sherman	Stuart Kesselman and Tony & Marilyn Melkonian	7 furlongs	1:21.89	$298,000	II	
2005	Imperialism	4	Victor Espinoza	Kristin Mulhall	Steve Taub	7 furlongs	1:21.70	$280,000	II	
2004	Kela	6	Tyler Baze	Mike R. Mitchell	Jay Manoogian	7 furlongs	1:21.17	$194,000	II	
2003	Disturbingthepeace	5	Victor Espinoza	Darrell Vienna	David S. & Rita Milch & Herrick Racing	7 furlongs	1:21.53	$150,000	II	
2002	Disturbingthepeace	4	Victor Espinoza	Darrell Vienna	David S. & Rita Milch	7 furlongs	1:21.89	$150,000	II	
2001	El Corredor	4	Victor Espinoza	Bob Baffert	Hal Earnhardt III	7 furlongs	1:20.42	$150,000	II	
2000	Love That Red	4	Corey Nakatani	Bob Baffert	Terry D. Wells	7 furlongs	1:21.89	$150,000	II	
1999	Regal Thunder	5	Chris Antley	Julio C. Canani	Dehaven, Levy, Malibu Valley Farms, et al.	7 furlongs	1:21.13	$150,000	II	
1998	Old Topper	3	Eddie Delahoussaye	Noble Threewitt	Barbara Hunter	7 furlongs	1:21.51	$158,700	III	
1997	Tres Paraiso	5	Gary L. Stevens	Darrell Vienna	Ernest Auerbach	7 furlongs	1:21.45	$108,200	III	
1996	Alphabet Soup	5	Chris Antley	David E. Hofmans	Ridder Thoroughbred Stud	7 furlongs	1:20.79	$105,450	III	
1995	Lit de Justice	5	Corey Nakatani	Jenine Sahadi	Evergreen Farm	7 furlongs	1:20.06	$103,525	III	
1994	D'Hallevant	4	Corey Nakatani	Ron McAnally	Mary Fusselman & Janice L. Ely	7 furlongs	1:20.25	$100,350	III	
1993	Slerp	4	Adalberto Diaz Lopez	Robert B. Hess Jr.	Allan L. Richie	7 furlongs	1:21.36	$87,850	Listed	
1992	Light of Morn	6	Eddie Delahoussaye	Rodney Rash	Robert E. Hibbert	7 furlongs	1:20.65	$107,275	Listed	
1991	Bruho	5	Corey Nakatani	Jerry M. Fanning	Joseph M. Scardino	7 furlongs	1:21.40	$82,600	Listed	
1990	Sensational Star	6	Rafael Q. Meza	William Spawr	Tony Calhoun, Larry Risoldi & John Sullivan	7 furlongs	1:20.60	$108,025		
1989	Olympic Native	4	Robbie Davis	Mike J. Orman	Joe Alvarez & Helen Smith	7 furlongs	1:20.20	$78,600		
1988	Sebrof	4	Gary L. Stevens	Laz Barrera	Aaron U. Jones	7 furlongs	1:20.40	$66,350		
1987	Zany Tactics	6	Jack L. Kaenel	Blake R. Heap	Vera C. Brunette	7 furlongs	1:21.20	$54,250		
1986	Bold Brawley	3	Pat Valenzuela	Ronald W. Ellis	Gilmour & Morrow	7 furlongs	1:20.40	$53,350		
1981–1985		Race not held								
Pat O'Brien Stakes
1980	Seafood	2	Marco Castaneda	Robert J. Frankel	Elmendorf Farm	7 1/2 furlongs	1:30.40	$45,850		2YO only

Legend:
All Weather Track Dirt Turf

== See also ==
List of American and Canadian Graded races
