= Los Angeles Handicap =

- Class: Grade III
- Location: Santa Anita Park; Arcadia, California, USA (relocated from the now closed Hollywood Park Racetrack; Inglewood, California, United States)
- Inaugurated: 1938
- Race type: Thoroughbred - Flat racing
- Website: www.santaanita.com

Race information
- Distance: 6 furlongs
- Surface: Cushion Track synthetic dirt
- Track: left-handed
- Qualification: Three-years-old
- Weight: Assigned
- Purse: $100,000 (since 2006)

The Los Angeles Handicap is an American Thoroughbred horse race run annually at Santa Anita Park in Arcadia, California during the spring racing season. It was previously run at Hollywood Park Racetrack in Inglewood, California), which closed in 2013. A Grade III sprint race run on dirt over a distance of six furlongs, it is open to horses aged three and older.

The race was not run in 2018. From 2007 to 2013, it was run on (Cushion Track synthetic dirt. For 2015 only, the race was run at Los Alamitos Racetrack and shortened to 5 1/2 furlongs due to the track dimensions. Prior to 1979, the race was run at a distance of seven furlongs.

The 1968 race was run in two divisions.

== Records ==
Speed record:

- 1:07.55 - Street Boss (2008) (at current distance of 6 furlongs)
- 1:19.80 - Triple Bend (1972) (stakes, track, and world record (at previous distance of 7 furlongs)

Most wins:

- 2 - Native Diver (1965, 1967)

Most wins by a jockey:

- 6 - Laffit Pincay, Jr. (1968, 1974, 1975, 1980, 1989, 1997)
- 5 - Donald Pierce (1969, 1970, 1971, 1972, 1973)

Most wins by a trainer:

- 5 - John W. Sadler (1986, 1988, 2003, 2009, 2010)
- 4 - Buster Millerick (1965, 1967, 1968, 1983)
- 4 - Bruce Headley (1999, 2002, 2008, 2014)

Most wins by an owner:

- 2 - Austin C. Taylor (1938, 1956)
- 2 - Fred W. Hooper (1962, 1977)
- 2 - M/M Louis K. Shapiro (1965, 1967)
- 2 - Gary & Cecil Barber (2009, 2010)

== Winners ==
Year	Winner	Age	Jockey	Trainer	Owner	Time
2017	Lord Simba	4	Martin Garcia	Bob Baffert	Baoma Corporation	1:08.74
2016	San Onofre	6	Edwin A. Maldonado	Karen Headley	Matson Racing	1:02.04
2015	Distinctiv Passion	5	Edwin A. Maldonado	Jeffrey L. Bonde	Brown/Klein/Lebherz	1:08.00
2014	Cyclometer	6	Edwin A. Maldonado	Bruce Headley	Headley/I. & A. Molasky	1:09.02
2013	Comma to the Top	5	Edwin A. Maldonado	Peter Miller	Barber/Birnbaum/Tsujihara	1:09.11
2012	Roman Threat	4	Rafael Bejarano	Bob Baffert	P & H Earnhardt III	1:08.57
2011	Camp Victory	4	Joe Talamo	Mike R. Mitchell	Featherston/Jacobsen/Miller	1:08.87
2010	Cost of Freedom	7	Tyler Baze	John W. Sadler	Gary & Cecil Barber	1:08.49
2009	Red Arrow	6	Joe Talamo	John W. Sadler	Gary & Cecil Barber	1:08.40
2008	Street Boss	4	David Flores	Bruce Headley	Bluegate Corp. et al.	1:07.55
2007	Sailors Sunset	4	Jon Court	Marcelo Polanco	Everest Stable	1:09.03
2006	Siren Lure	5	Alex Solis	Art Sherman	Stuart Kesselman et al.	1:08.57
2005	Forest Grove	4	Corey Nakatani	Eoin G. Harty	Aaron & Marie Jones	1:08.57
2004	Pohave	6	Jon Court	Douglas F. O'Neill	Kagele Bros, Inc. et al.	1:08.12
2003	Hombre Rapido	6	Jose Valdivia Jr.	John W. Sadler	Granja Vista Del Rio Stable	1:08.49
2002	Kona Gold	8	Alex Solis	Bruce Headley	Headley, Molasky, High Tech	1:08.72
2001	Caller One	4	Corey Nakatani	James K. Chapman	Carolyn Chapman & Theresa McArthur	1:08.35
2000	Highland Gold	5	Chris McCarron	Jerry Hollendorfer	George Todaro & J. Hollendorfer	1:09.11
1999	Son Of A Pistol	7	Alex Solis	Bruce Headley	Luis Asistio, B.B.C. Stables, Jeff Davenport	1:08.17
1998	Gold Land	7	Kent Desormeaux	Neil D. Drysdale	Prince Fahd Salman	1:08.06
1997	Men's Exclusive	4	Laffit Pincay Jr.	Wesley A. Ward	Hartsel E. Reed	1:08.97
1996	Abaginone †	5	Gary Stevens	Sanford Shulman	Charles & Clear Valley Stables	1:08.33
1996	Paying Dues †	4	Chris Antley	Clifford W. Sise Jr.	Randy Welty et al.	1:08.33
1995	Forest Gazelle	4	Kent Desormeaux	Robert J. Frankel	Juddmonte Farms	1:07.90
1994	J F Williams	5	Chris McCarron	Ron McAnally	John Carr & Double J Farm	1:09.03
1993	Star of the Crop	4	Gary Stevens	Willard L. Proctor	Glen Hill Farm	1:08.78
1992	Cardmania	6	Eddie Delahoussaye	Derek Meredith	Jean Couvercelle	1:08.73
1991	Black Jack Road	7	Russell Baze	Fordell Fierce	Donna & Dorothy Kisela	1:09.10
1990	Timeless Answer	4	Robbie Davis	Ronald W. Ellis	Ed Friendly	1:08.80
1989	Sam Who	4	Laffit Pincay Jr.	Henry M. Moreno	Carlton Sell	1:09.40
1988	Olympic Prospect	4	Alex Solis	John W. Sadler	Gregg Alsdorf, Frank Sinatra, Lawrence Opas	1:08.80
1987	Bedside Promise	5	Gary Stevens	Robert L. Martin	Jawl Brothers	1:08.40
1986	Rosie's K. T.	5	Pat Valenzuela	John W. Sadler	Marianne Millard & Bea Rous	1:10.00
1985	Charging Falls	4	Bill Shoemaker	Jack Van Berg	John A. Franks	1:08.80
1984	Night Mover	4	Eddie Delahoussaye	Robert J. Frankel	Ann & Jerry Moss	1:08.40
1983	Mr. Prime Minister	7	Martin Pedroza	Buster Millerick	Sardara Sengara	1:09.80
1982	Terresto's Singer	5	Pat Valenzuela	Cliff Goodwin	Tschudi & Wong	1:09.20
1981	Doonesbury	4	Sandy Hawley	Barney Willis	Fletcher Jones, Sam Roffe, et al.	1:08.80
1980	Beau's Eagle	4	Laffit Pincay Jr.	Larry Rose	Relatively Stable	1:08.20
1979	Hawkin's Special	4	Darrel McHargue	Jack Van Berg	Donald Bruce & Jack Van Berg	1:08.40
1978	J. O. Tobin	4	Steve Cauthen	Laz Barrera	George A. Pope Jr.	1:21.40
1977	Beat Inflation	4	Darrel McHargue	Julius E. Tinsley Jr.	Fred W. Hooper	1:20.20
1976	Century's Envoy	5	Sandy Hawley	Jerry Dutton	M/M John J. Elmore Sr.	1:20.80
1975	Big Band	5	Laffit Pincay Jr.	Tommy Heard Jr.	Heardsdale	1:20.60
1974	Ancient Title	4	Laffit Pincay Jr.	Keith L. Stucki Sr.	Kirkland Stable	1:20.40
1973	Soft Victory	5	Donald Pierce	Ron McAnally	Max R. Prestridge Jr.	1:21.00
1972	Triple Bend	4	Donald Pierce	Vance Longden	Frank M. McMahon	1:19.80
1971	Fleet Surprise	5	Donald Pierce	Frank E. Childs	Perne L. & Chuck T. Grissom	1:20.80
1970	Ack Ack	4	Donald Pierce	Charles E. Whittingham	Cain Hoy Stable	1:20.60
1969	Indulto	6	Donald Pierce	Bert C. Littrell	Mrs. Edward Lasker	1:20.60
1968	Rising Market (1st div.)	4	Laffit Pincay Jr.	Ted Saladin	M/M Bert W. Martin	1:20.60
1968	Kissin' George (2nd div.)	5	Bill Mahorney	Buster Millerick	DeCourcy Graham	1:21.20
1967	Native Diver	8	Jerry Lambert	Buster Millerick	M/M Louis K. Shapiro	1:21.00
1966	Nasharco	4	Bobby Jennings	Roy Hodges	Dr. Robert S. Flinn	1:21.60
1965	Native Diver	6	Jerry Lambert	Buster Millerick	M/M Louis K. Shapiro	1:20.00
1964	Cyrano	5	John L. Rotz	William J. Hirsch	Greentree Stable	1:21.40
1963	Doc Jocoy	4	Willie Harmatz	Lionel C. Sternberger	M/M Lionel C. Sternberger	1:20.80
1962	Winonly	5	Willie Harmatz	Julius E. Tinsley Jr.	Fred W. Hooper	1:21.60
1961	T.V. Lark	4	Johnny Longden	Paul K. Parker	Preston W. Madden	1:21.80
1960	Finnegan	4	Ralph Neves	William B. Finnegan	Neil S. McCarthy	1:20.80
1959	Hillsdale	4	Tommy Barrow	Martin L. Fallon Jr.	Clarence W. Smith	1:21.00
1958	How Now	5	Willie Harmatz	Cecil Jolly	George C. Newell	1:21.60
1957	Porterhouse	6	Johnny Longden	Charles E. Whittingham	Llangollen Farm Stable	1:20.80
1956	Colonel Mack	4	Ralph Neves	Sam Brunson	Austin C. Taylor	1:09.00
1955	Karim	5	Gordon Glisson	Fred M. Smith	M/M John Eyraud	1:09.20
1939	Main Man	5	George Woolf	Ted D. Grimes	Louis B. Mayer	1:43.00
1938	Whichcee	4	Tim Sena	Darrell Cannon	Austin C. Taylor	1:44.40

- † In 1996 there was a dead heat for first.
