= Porterhouse (horse) =

American-bred Thoroughbred racehorse

- Sire: Endeavour
- Grandsire: British Empire
- Dam: Red Stamp
- Damsire: Bimelech
- Sex: Stallion
- Foaled: 1951
- Country: United States
- Colour: Bay
- Breeder: Liz Person
- Owner: Llangollen Farm
- Trainer: Charles E. Whittingham
- Record: 70: 19-8-12
- Earnings: $519,460

Major wins
- Christiana Stakes (1953); Belmont Futurity Stakes (1953); National Stallion Stakes (1953); Old Knickerbocker Handicap (1954); Lakes and Flowers Handicap (1955, 1956); San Carlos Handicap (1955, 1956); Santa Barbara Handicap (1956); Californian Stakes (1956); Hollywood Express Handicap (1957); Los Angeles Handicap (1957); Palos Verdes Handicap (1957)

Awards
- DRF & TRA American Champion Two-Year-Old Colt (1953)

Honours
- Porterhouse Handicap at Hollywood Park Racetrack

Porterhouse (1951–1971) was an American Champion Thoroughbred racehorse.

== Background ==
Bred by Liz Person and raced under her Llangollen Farm banner, Porterhouse was a son of the Argentine-bred Endeavour who also sired Corn Husker, Prove It and Pretense, three top runners who each won the Santa Anita Handicap. His dam was Red Stamp, a daughter of the U.S. Racing Hall of Fame inductee Bimelech.

Conditioned for racing by Charlie Whittingham, Porterhouse was the forty-year-old trainer's first stakes winner and first Champion.

== Racing career ==
In 1953, Porterhouse won East Coast races including the National Stallion Stakes and the then most important race for his age group, the Belmont Futurity Stakes. Porterhouse also won the 1953 Saratoga Special Stakes but was disqualified and set back to last.

Porterhouse was voted American Champion Two-Year-Old Colt by the Daily Racing Form and the Thoroughbred Racing Association. The rival poll organized by Turf & Sports Digest magazine was topped by Hasty Road.

In 1954, three-year-old Porterhouse had a sub-par year in racing, with his only important win coming in the Old Knickerbocker Handicap. The colt did not run in either of the first two races of the U.S. Triple Crown series and finished ninth in the Belmont Stakes won by High Gun. During the next three years in racing, Porterhouse returned to his winning ways at racetracks in California. He captured several top events, highlighted by his win over future U.S. Racing Hall of Fame inductee Swaps in the 1956 Californian Stakes and the Hollywood Express Handicap in world record time for 5 1/2 furlongs on dirt at Hollywood Park Racetrack.

== Stud career ==
Retired to stud duty, Porterhouse met with reasonable success, siring several good runners including Coaching Club American Oaks winner, Our Cheri Amour, and multiple stakes winners Isle of Greece, Port Wine, and Farwell Party.

Porterhouse died at age twenty in 1971 and was buried a The Stallion Station in Lexington, Kentucky.
