= Windy Sands Handicap =

The Windy Sands Handicap is an American Thoroughbred horse race held annually at Del Mar Racetrack in Del Mar, California. An ungraded stakes, it is open to three-year-olds and up willing to race the 1 mile (8 furlongs) on the dirt. It currently offers a purse of $85,000 added.

The race is named after Windy Sands, born in 1957, by Your Host (sire of Kelso, out of Samoa Winds) who holds the Del Mar track record for 1 1/16 miles on dirt of 1:40.00 set on August 4, 1962, in winning the San Diego Handicap.

== Past winners ==
Winners of the Windy Sands since 2005:

- 2010 - Tropic Storm
- 2009 - Star Nicholas (Michael C. Baze)
- 2008 - Albertus Maximus (this was Perfect Drift's last race; he came in third at the age of 9)
- 2007 - Wanna Runner (Tyler Baze) (Grade I winner, Heatseeker, placed.)
- 2006 - Preachinatthebar
- 2005 - Total Impact
