= Dobson Mills =

- U.S. National Register of Historic Places
- U.S. Historic district
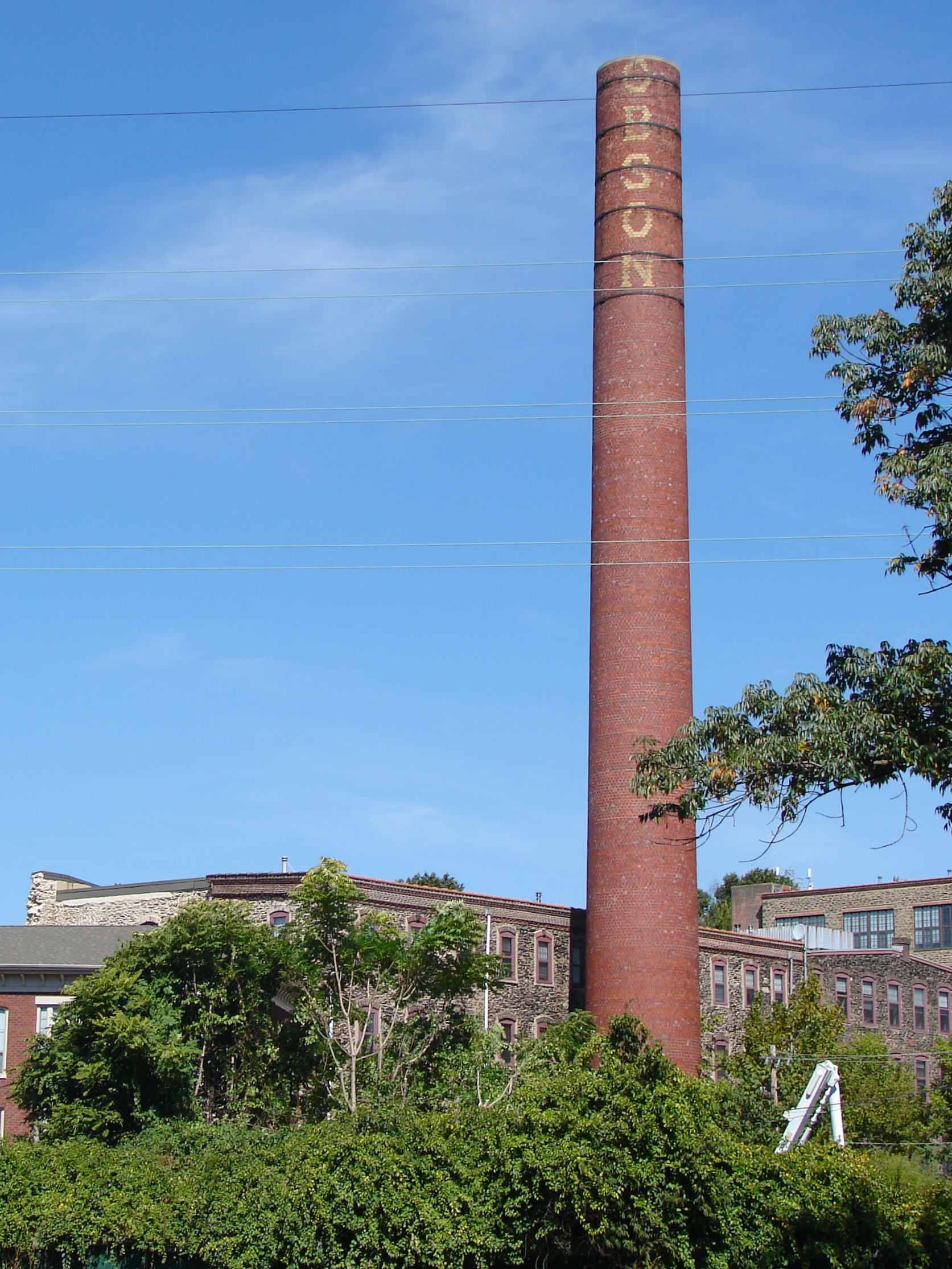
- Dobson Mills, September 2010

- Location within Philadelphia Location within Pennsylvania Location within the United States
- Location: 4001-4041 Ridge Ave.; 3502-3530 Scott's La., Philadelphia, Pennsylvania
- Coordinates: 40°00′28″N 75°11′14″W
- Area: 20 acres (8.1 ha)
- Architect: Lockwood, Greene & Co.; Et al.
- NRHP reference No.: 88001214
- Added to NRHP: July 28, 1988

Dobson Mills is a historic industrial complex and national historic district located in the Hunting Park Industrial Area of Philadelphia, Pennsylvania. It encompasses 19 contributing buildings, 2 contributing sites, and 2 contributing structures. They were built between 1858 and 1928, and are primarily of heavy timber frame construction with load bearing masonry walls. They range from two to five stories in height. The complex included blanket, overcoat, and wool yarn production facilities, a carpet mill, and plush mill.

It was added to the National Register of Historic Places in 1988.
