= Liz Whitney Tippett =

American socialite, philanthropist and champion horsewoman

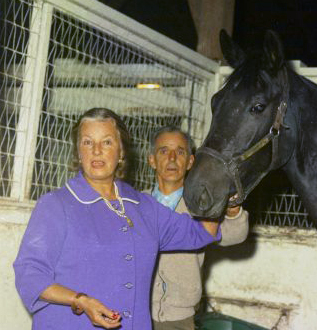
- Tippett pictured with yearling, 1969
- Born: Mary Elizabeth Altemus; June 18, 1906; Wynnewood, Pennsylvania
- Died: October 30, 1988 (aged 82); Llangollen Farm, Loudoun County, Virginia
- Resting place: Ivy Hill Cemetery, Upperville, Virginia
- Occupations: Socialite, horsewoman, racehorse owner, breeder, philanthropist
- Organization: Llangollen Farm Stable
- Spouses: John Hay Whitney (m. 1930; div. 1940) Dr. E. Cooper Person Jr. (m. 1948; died 1952) Richard D. Lunn (m. 1954; div. 1959) Col. Cloyce Joseph Tippett (m. 1960)
- Relatives: Samuel D. Riddle (uncle)

Mary Elizabeth Whitney Person Lunn Tippett (born Mary Elizabeth Altemus; June 18, 1906 – October 30, 1988) was a wealthy American socialite and philanthropist who was a champion horsewoman and for more than fifty years, a prominent owner/breeder of Thoroughbred racehorses.

== Early life ==
Liz was born Mary Elizabeth Altemus in Wynnewood, Pennsylvania. She was the daughter of Elizabeth Dobson Altemus and Lemuel Coffin Altemus, a wealthy entrepreneur who made his success in the textile business. "Liz", as she would become known throughout her life, developed a love of horses and equestrian competitions at an early age. A 1939 TIME magazine article describes her as "a spirited, devil-may-care rider who has been winning blue ribbons on the horseshow circuit for 15 years" and whose "riding technique became the very pattern for aspiring horsewomen."

== Thoroughbred horse racing ==
Liz Altemus owned and raced Thoroughbred horses before she married. In 1930, her horse Capstone ran fifth in the inaugural running of the Wilson Stakes at Saratoga Race Course. After her marriage to Jock Whitney she remained active in Thoroughbred racing. She set up her own operations and made her Llangollen home a major breeding and training center, constructing a variety of equine fittings, including a famous horseshoe-shaped barn, stud barn and broodmare sheds, tack rooms, paddocks, and a training track on the property.

In the 1930s, she owned a string of successful racehorses, winning the 1931 Adirondack Stakes with her filly Brocado and with Stepenfetchit, won the 1932 Latonia Derby and ran third in the Kentucky Derby. With her colt Singing Wood, Liz won the 1933 Belmont Futurity Stakes, the 1934 Withers Stakes and Queens County Handicap. In 1936, Singing Wood won the Toboggan Handicap at Belmont Park in Elmont and when her husband's business interest took the couple to Hollywood, the colt raced there and won the 1936 Santa Margarita Handicap.

Following her divorce from Jock Whitney, TIME, in its March 1942 issue, reported that she planned to concentrate on racing and would sell all but one of her show horses. Nonetheless, she remained active in the sport for many years, racing horses in both flat racing and steeplechase events under the name of Llangollen Farm. She imported bloodstock from Europe for breeding purposes and over the years expanded operations to breed horses in Ocala, Florida and in Ireland.

Whitney worked with notable trainers such as future U.S. Racing Hall of Fame inductee Henry S. Clark who got his first stakes win with her colt, Blue Cypress. Other trainers of note who conditioned Llangollen Farm horses were Norman L. Haymaker, James W. Healy, Stanley T. Greene, Frank H. Merrill Jr. and another future Hall of Fame trainer Charlie Whittingham who ran her California stable. In 1953, Whittingham trained his first Champion in the form of her two-year-old colt, Porterhouse. She bred Sherluck, winner of the 1961 Belmont Stakes.

=== Saratoga, New York ===
She purchased a farm property on Fitch Road in the town of Saratoga, New York. The house, built in the 1770s, was used as her residence during the racing season at nearby Saratoga Race Course where many of America's horse racing elite gathered each summer. Sold in 1971, the property today is owned by McMahon of Saratoga Thoroughbreds, LLC. Her stable colors of purple and pink on farm structures in time have given way to the more modest colors for McMahon of green and white.

== Personal life ==
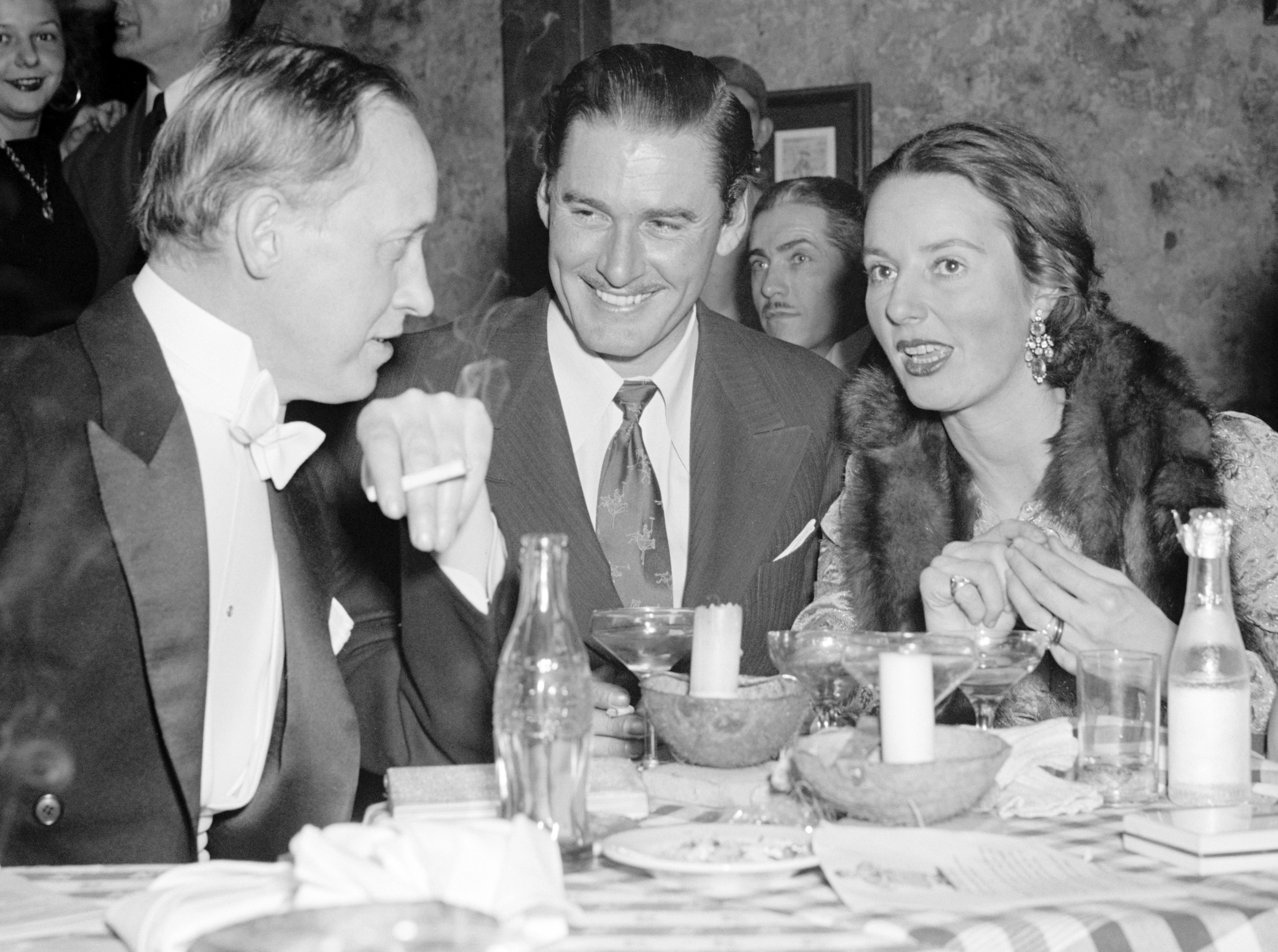
Liz Whitney (right) with Harry Hopkins and Errol Flynn in February 1939, at the opening of a supper club in Washington, D.C.

Through her social standing and involvement with horses, Liz Altemus met and married on September 25, 1930 John Hay "Jock" Whitney (1904–1982), a member of the extremely wealthy Whitney family of New York. Jock Whitney's grandfather, father and uncle were all heavily involved in Thoroughbred horse racing. They divorced in June 1940, and Liz retained the Virginia estate.

On June 18, 1948, she married for a second time to Dr. Edward Cooper Person Jr. (1910–1952), a surgery professor, in Upperville. At the wedding, her matron of honor was Lillian Bostwick Phipps, the wife of Ogden Phipps, and her husband's best man was Dr. William Harding Jackson, the president of New York Hospital. Person died in 1952.

In November 1954, she married for the third time, to Richard Dwight Lunn (1914–1962), a forty-year-old public-relations man and step-son of U.S. Senator Wallace H. White, in Washington, D.C. They divorced five years later, and Lunn died shortly thereafter in 1962.

Her fourth, and final marriage, took place in 1960 to Col. Cloyce Joseph Tippett (1913–1993), who headed the Lima, Peru, office of the International Civil Aviation Organization. This marriage, her longest, lasted until her death in 1988.

Tippett died of cancer in 1988 at Llangollen Farm. In 2004, she was inducted posthumously in the Virginia Thoroughbred Association Hall of Fame.

=== Llangollen estate ===
For their 1930 marriage, Jock Whitney bought his bride Llangollen estate, a large and historic property off Trappe Road west of Upperville, Virginia at the foot of the Blue Ridge Mountains.

Eight miles from the village of Middleburg, the area had long been home to many horse farms and since the mid-19th century, a center for equestrian events. By the early part of the 20th century Thoroughbred breeding operations were gaining importance and in 1930, Liz Whitney would be one of the first of a number of prominent personalities in Thoroughbred horse racing who would develop substantial and important breeding operations. Others who came to the area include heiress Isabel Dodge Sloane, who built the highly successful Brookmeade Stud, the prestigious Rokeby Farm of Paul Mellon, Jack Kent Cooke's Kent Farms, and the Newstead Farm of Diana M. Firestone and her husband Bertram. Since the early 1960s, for two days each year more than ten horse farms and centers in Upperville and Middleburg open their gates to visitors.

A prominent part of the hunt set, Liz Whitney was a member of the Upperville Colt and Horse Show for many years and has a place on the organizations Wall of Honor.

At her Llangollen estate, Liz Whitney entertained celebrities and politicians as well as personalities involved in the racing world such as Bing Crosby, Eddie Arcaro and Prince Aly Khan. Always a free spirit, in a 2001 book titled The Middleburg Mystique, author Vicky Moon recounted how Whitney hosted wild hunt balls and of the time when she brought her favorite horse into the mansion's great room. Moon's book also says that she kept thirty-five dogs with the most beloved ones stored in her deep freezer after they died.

== Racehorses owned ==
Some other successful racehorses owned by Liz Whitney Tippett included:

- Corn Husker - won L. E. Stoddard Jr. Steeplechase in 1956 and in 1957 flat racing won the San Gabriel and San Juan Capistrano Handicap and the prestigious Santa Anita Handicap.
- Divine Comedy - won the 1960 Saranac Handicap, Roamer Handicap and 1961 Saratoga Handicap.
- Lord Derby - won 1972 San Luis Obispo Handicap.
- Mister Gus - won 1955 William P. Kyne Handicap; 1956 San Antonio Handicap, Arlington Handicap and Woodward Stakes.
- Nashville - won 1957 Lakes and Flowers Handicap and Palos Verdes Handicap.
- Porterhouse - 1953 Champion 2-year-old colt. Won the Belmont Futurity Stakes, San Carlos Handicap (1955, 1956), Santa Barbara Handicap (1956), defeated Swaps in the 1956 Californian Stakes.
- Pretense - won numerous stakes races including the 1967 Santa Anita Handicap and Gulfstream Park Handicap and voted Champion Handicap Male in 1967.
- Tumble Wind - won 1966 Westchester Stakes, Haggin Stakes; 1967 San Vicente Stakes, Argonaut Stakes, Hollywood Derby; 1968 San Gorgonio Handicap and San Luis Obispo Handicap.
- Restless Runner - won 1971 Baldwin Stakes and Marina del Rey Stakes.
- Restless Wind - won 1958 Prairie State Stakes, National Stakes, Washington Park Futurity, Arlington Futurity, Tremont Stakes and 1960 Tokyo City Cup. He was the leading Florida-based stallion during the mid-sixties.
- Royal Living - won 1959 San Juan Capistrano Handicap.
- Social Climber - won 1956 Cinema Handicap, San Felipe Stakes, El Dorado Handicap and 1957 Californian Stakes

== In popular culture ==
In the 1979 film, The Champ, actress Joan Blondell based her character Dolly Kenyon, a "salty horse owner and society matron," on Liz.
