= California Breeders' Champion Stakes =

Annual horse race in Arcadia, California, US

California Breeders' Champion Stakes is an American Thoroughbred horse race held annually since 1935 at Santa Anita Park in Arcadia, California.

Run during the last week of December, the seven Furlong race is open to two-year-old horses bred in the State of California. The race currently offers a purse of $125,000.

In winning the 2007 edition, Bob Black Jack set a new Santa Anita track record of 1:20.37 for seven furlongs on synthetic dirt. In the 2009 running, the race was set at one and one/sixteenth miles.

== Winners of the California Breeders' Champion Stakes ==
Year	Winner	Jockey	Trainer	Owner	Time
2013	Qiaona (Filly Division)	Garrett Gomez	Ed Moger Jr.	Curt & Lila Lanning	1:37.35
2013	Tiz a Minister (2nd Division)	Garrett Gomez	Paul Aguirre	S.A.Y. Racing	1:36.56
2012	NO RACE?
2011	Ismene (Filly Division)			Stephen Ferraro	1:21.61
2010	Thirtyfirststreet	Rafael Bejarano	Doug F. O'Neill	Sterling Stable/Gorman/Haymes	1:22.20
2009	Caracortado	Paul Atkinson	Michael Machowsky	Blahut Racing/LLC/Lo Hi Racing	1:43.61
2008	All Saint	Rafael Bejarano	Triphon B. Dahl	Eduardo Gamez	1:22.07
2007	Bob Black Jack	Richard Migliore	James Kasparoff	Jeff Harmon & Tim Kasparof	1:20.37
2006	Pirates Deputy	Garrett Gomez	Bob Baffert	Villyard, Shapiro, Tweedy	1:23.66
2005	Da Stoops	Victor Espinoza	Bob Baffert	Watson & Weitman Performances LLC	1:21.63
2004	Uncle Denny	René Douglas	Rafael Becerra	Stan E. Fulton	1:22.73
2003	Don'tsellmeshort	Alex Solis	Dan Hendricks	Cecil N. Peacock	1:25.09
2002	Excessivepleasure	David Flores	Doug F. O'Neill	Lee & Ty Leatherman	1:22.62
2001	Earl of Danby	Chris McCarron	J. Paco Gonzalez	McCaffery & Toffan	1:23.32
2000	Proud Tower	Victor Espinoza	Jose L. Silva	Tricar Stables	1:21.73

== Earlier winners ==
- 1999 – Gibson County
- 1998 – General Challenge
- 1997 – Oly Ogy
- 1996 – In Excessive Bull
- 1995 – Ready To Order
- 1995 – Snow Kidd'n
- 1994 – Individual Style
- 1993 – El Atroz
- 1992 – Irish Twist
- 1991 – Apollo
- 1990 – Tarascon
- 1989 – Kool Arrival
- 1988 – No Commitment
- 1987 – Fast Delivery
- 1986 – Snow Chief
- 1985 – The Rogers Four
- 1984 – Fali Time
- 1983 – Northrexford Drive
- 1982 – Prince Spellbound
- 1981 – No race held
- 1980 – Johnlee n' Harold
- 1979 – Jaklin Klugman
- 1978 – Flying Paster
- 1977 – Misrepresentation
- 1976 – Current Concept
- 1975 – Stained Glass
- 1974 – Mr Paul
- 1973 – Money Lender
- 1972 – Ancient Title
- 1971 – Royal Owl
- 1970 – Bold Joey
- 1969 – No race held
- 1968 – Mr Joe F
- 1967 – Don B
- 1966 – Mira Femme
- 1965 – Separate Checks (1st div)
- 1965 – Wingover (2nd div)
- 1964 – Gummo
- 1963 – Hill Rise (1st division)
- 1963 – Nearco Blue (2nd division)
- 1962 – Kingomine
- 1961 – Najin
- 1961 – Olden Times
- 1960 – New Policy
- 1959 – Linmold
- 1958 – Old Pueblo
- 1957 – Prince Khaled
- 1956 – Fathers Risk
- 1955 – Guerrero
- 1954 – Major Speed
- 1952 – De Anza
- 1951 – Big Noise
- 1950 – Gold Capitol
- 1949 – Your Host
- 1948 – Duplicator
- 1947 – Call Bell
- 1946 – Shim Malone
- 1945 – Honeymoon
- 1941–1944 – No race held
- 1940 – Yankee Dandy
- 1939 – Red Chip
- 1938 – Dear Diary
- 1937 – Iron Hills
- 1936 – Some Devil
- 1935 – Lloyd Pan
