= Hughlette Wheeler =

American sculptor

- Born: April 24, 1901; Christmas, Florida, United States
- Died: December 12, 1954 (aged 53); Christmas, Florida, United States
- Occupation: Sculptor

James Hughlette Wheeler (April 24, 1901 – December 12, 1954) also known as "Tex" Wheeler, was an American sculptor renowned for his lifelike depictions of cowboys, cattlemen, and horses. Known as the "Cowboy Sculptor," Wheeler's work captured the essence of the American West and the spirit of the equestrian world. Some of his most famous works include a life-sized statue of "Seabiscuit" and a life sized statue of the renowned jockey, George Woolf, and statues of cowboy entertainer Will Rogers.

== Early life and education ==
Wheeler was born to James and Nora Ida Wheeler. He had one sibling, a sister three years his junior. Their mother died when Wheeler was seven years old, leaving the children to be raised by friends and family members. Their father, described as a poor provider, largely abandoned them until they were old enough to work around the home. His teen years were spent as a cowhand in the wilds of Orange and Osceola Counties in Central Florida. During this time, he created one of his first pieces: a cow's head whittled from a cowhorn using a pocket knife.

== Early artistic development and recognition ==
In 1925, at age 24 he matriculated at the Cleveland School of Art, today called Cleveland Institute of Art for sculpture, having never modeled until 1923 but showing natural aptitude. Wheeler's artistic potential was recognized by his father's first cousin from Cleveland, Ohio. This relative offered him room and board to attend the Cleveland School of Art, with tuition paid by an aunt. When asked to make a flower out of a piece of clay, Wheeler instead crafted a horse so impressive that his teacher had it cast in bronze. The first mention of him in a newspaper appears to be in the local paper, September 1926, where he is both praised and criticized, "Being a student he still has faults."

While in college, he was successful doing commissions of favorite animals of wealthy polo pony owners earning several thousand dollars for many. His first student works were purchased by Cleveland book store owners Korner & Wood Galleries. In his first year, it is reported he sold five bronzes that had been cast in bronze at a foundry in France and the following year had some of his work handled by Tiffany. In his second year he was being referred to as a prodigy in local newspaper and his work was on display in a local gallery. By 1928 he had his work in the Cleveland Museum of Art.

He studied under Russian-American sculptor, Alexander Blazys. While in art school, he won the Herman Matzen Scholarship to study a year in Europe / Paris. The Orlando Evening Star quoted Matzen as saying, "Wheeler will be greater than Remington as an interpreter of wild things and fine animals." In 1930, in Paris he became a pupil of the great French sculptors, Despiau, and Gimond. While there he took up the study of etching and drawing.

It was during his time at art school, Wheeler says he was given the nickname "Tex". It was during his years at Cleveland School of Art that Wheeler said, "I have learned to model the human figure. When I first went to school I could do horses and steers."

One of his early pieces, "The Hard Pull," depicted a cowboy throwing his weight on the off-stirrup, helping his horse keep its feet while dragging a steer out of a bog. The tension and struggle were so vividly rendered that the unseen steer became almost visible to viewers.

The proportions and positions of Wheeler's first three models were indeed so natural that one teacher declared they had no "art" in them, they were "too natural". However, even this criticism, which paradoxically praised Wheeler's accuracy, faded away when Wheeler returned from a visit to the Messrs. Korner & Wood with a quotation of $625 apiece for his first works. This significant valuation of his early pieces demonstrated the immediate recognition of Wheeler's exceptional talent and the commercial appeal of his naturalistic style.

== Critical acclaim and comparisons to Western art legends ==
By January 1927, Wheeler's work was gaining significant attention. The Time magazine article of January 10, 1927, which reported on Wheeler's rapid rise to prominence, noted that "Fame impended" for the young artist from Florida. By April 1932, he was featured on the front page of The Los Angeles Times and called by the paper, "Cowboy Sculptor Master of His Craft." This early recognition set the stage for Wheeler's long career as one of America's preeminent sculptors of Western and equestrian subjects.

Time magazine reported that for two months, Clevelanders had been admiring his small white plaster sculptures of horses and men, which experts declared were superior to anything of their kind ever before produced in the United States.

Wheeler's emergence came at a pivotal time in Western art. Frederick Remington, known for his paintings and models of Western plains life, had died in 1909. Charles Marion Russell, a Montana-based cowboy artist celebrated for his authentic depictions of ranch life, had died in 1926. In this context, Wheeler was seen as a potential successor to these giants of Western art. Will James, a respected cowboy artist and writer from Great Falls, Montana, gave Wheeler's work a resounding endorsement. After viewing Wheeler's casts in Cleveland, James stated, "I have seen the work of the best of 'em - sculptors of cowboy life, that of Frederick Remington and Charles Marion Russell, and today's the first day I've ever seen a real cowboy ridin' a real cowpony."

Wheeler's work gained international recognition when his work was part of the sculpture event in the art competition at the 1932 Summer Olympics, though he did not win a medal.

15 years after his death, Willard H. Porter, wrote about him, "the stuff he did for horsemen, in its own way, was just as great as the stuff two other artists - Remington and Russell - did for the old west."

== Artistic philosophy and working methods ==
Wheeler's artistic philosophy was deeply rooted in his understanding and appreciation of horses. He felt that "no two bronze horses should look exactly alike, just as no two live horses do." This commitment to authenticity sometimes led to interesting interactions with clients. In one notable instance, George M. Humphrey, who served as the United States Secretary of the Treasury from 1953 to 1957, commissioned Wheeler to create a model of his favorite hunter in the early 1930s. The horse was slightly "over in the knees" (buck-kneed), and Humphrey asked Wheeler for an exact portrayal. When the sculpture was completed, Humphrey was surprised by the accuracy of the depiction, initially believing Wheeler had exaggerated the horse's condition. Upon comparing the sculpture to the actual horse, Humphrey had to admit that Wheeler had faithfully duplicated his hunter in every respect, including the slight unsoundness in the forelegs.

Wheeler believed that "A piece of sculpture that is good rouses some feeling in a person." This philosophy guided his work process, leading him to assert, "That's why I think it's a mistake to keep on working on things when you know you've done your best to put in clay the feeling you had." For Wheeler, knowing when to stop was one of an artist's most important skills. His niece, Mary Ida Shearhart said of him, “He used to say it took two people to do a piece of art: one to do it, and the other to shoot him before he ruined it.”

In terms of technique, Wheeler primarily used the lost-wax process for casting his bronzes. This method, in which a wax model is created, encased in a mold, and then melted out to be replaced by molten bronze, allowed for the fine, accurate details that Wheeler was particularly concerned with capturing.

Wheeler was known to prioritize authenticity over artistic convention. He would rather go unpaid than create a model of a horse he didn't like. He also once told the Los Angeles Times that polo, because of its exciting moments of action for both horse and rider was a subject that interested him greatly.

== Reception, notable works, and exhibitions ==
Wheeler's sculptures gained significant recognition and acclaim, and also sometimes received mixed reactions from art critics and horse experts, reflecting the unique position he occupied between fine art and specialist equestrian knowledge.

A notable example of the varying reception to his work is his piece "Tail Shot," which depicted a difficult polo maneuver. Initially, art critics derided the work as "utterly impossible," questioning Wheeler's knowledge of polo and horses. However, Wheeler invited high-goal polo players to explain the maneuver to the critics. After this explanation, one critic who had originally criticized the statue praised it as "a unique demonstration of sheer virtuosity in solving the complex problem of balance and jet-propelled action."

This incident exemplifies Wheeler's prioritization of accuracy and authenticity in his depictions of horses and equestrian sports. It also demonstrates how his work could bridge the gap between fine art and specialist knowledge of horsemanship, however, Wheeler was clear about his intended audience. He often said, "I'm doing this stuff for horsemen, not critics."

While Wheeler's work may not have received widespread public recognition during his lifetime, his sculptures pleased his clients. Rukin Jelks, a racer of quarter horses and thoroughbreds, said of Wheeler: "I haven't seen any other artist who could do a portrait of a horse and do it so realistically. Tex could shape up a horse's personality perfectly after the first draft in clay." Similarly, Melvin Haskell, who raced thoroughbreds and quarter horses, stated, "Without reservation, he was great and he got great likenesses. He had the extraordinary talent of catching the perfect likeness of an animal."

His work was exhibited at several prestigious venues, including:

- Korner & Wood Galleries, (1926–1930), Cleveland
- The Central Florida Exposition, (Orlando), 1928
- Cleveland Museum of Art (1928–1929)
- London [unknown when or where]
- Paris [unknown when or where]
- The Central Florida Exposition, (Orlando), 1930
- Gage Gallery, Cleveland (1931)(1934)
- The Central Florida Exposition, (Orlando), 1931
- Olympiad, Los Angeles County Museum of Art (LACMA), 1932
- The Ambassador, (Los Angeles), 1932
- Ilsley Gallery (Los Angeles), 1932-1933
- Art Exhibition, (Miami, FL), 1934
- Arizona Biltmore Hotel, (Phoenix), 1934
- Ackerman Gallery, (NYC, NY), 1936
- Fort Worth Frontier Centennial, 1936
- Biltmore Salon (Los Angeles), 1939
- Desert Inn Gallery (Palm Desert), 1939
- Golden Gate International Exposition (GGIE), 1940
- N.C. Museum of Art, 1967
- Amon Carter Museum (Fort Worth, TX), 1961–2000.

His works can be found in notable collections including Will Rogers State Park (Santa Monica), Will Rogers Memorial Museum (Claremore, OK), Santa Anita Park (Seabiscuit statue and George Woolf statue), National Museum of Racing and Hall of Fame, Ridgewood Ranch, the permanent collection at the Fort Christmas Historical Park, and at Pebble Hill Plantation in the Elisabeth Ireland Gallery.

=== Seabiscuit and George Woolf statues ===
Perhaps Wheeler's most famous work is his statue of the racehorse Seabiscuit. Commissioned by Charles S. Howard, Wheeler cast two statues of Seabiscuit in 1940-41 while the horseracing legend was still alive. Many sculptors tried to get the commission but it was Wheeler's rough model that won the job.

Legend had it that Wheeler would not work with a horse he did not like, going through painstaking observation and detail to capture his subject's personality. Seabiscuit, once considered an unmanageable nag, was described by Wheeler as a "highly satisfactory model" during their time together. Wheeler made two castings of the Seabiscuit statue:

1. The first and best-known resides in the walking ring at Santa Anita Park. Unveiled in February 1941, the revealing was attended by thousands, including Seabiscuit himself. This statue remains a staple of the track's layout to this day.
2. The second statue initially resided with Seabiscuit at Ridgewood Ranch until Charles Howard's death in 1950 led the surviving family to sell the property. It was then relocated to Binglin Stables in Moorpark Ranch, California, owned by musician Bing Crosby and Lindsay Howard, Charles Howard's son.

By the mid-1990s, the elements had taken their toll on the second statue. Kittredge Collins, the great-grandson of Charles S. Howard, recognized the need to preserve its integrity and donated it to the National Museum of Racing and Hall of Fame in Saratoga Springs, New York. The statue was unveiled there in June 1996.

In 2007, Chris and Anita Lowe, England-based benefactors of the Seabiscuit Heritage Foundation, funded a project to create a replica of the piece. This duplicate was toured around the country before being permanently placed at Ridgewood Ranch, bringing a version of the monument back to its original resting place along with its subject, who is buried on the property.

Following the success of the Seabiscuit statue, Wheeler created another significant work for Santa Anita Park: the bronze statue of jockey George Woolf. Sculpted in 1948, this statue stands as a testament to one of Seabiscuit's primary riders and a legendary jockey in his own right.

The George Woolf statue was erected in 1949, with an inscription on its black marble base indicating it was "Sponsored by the California Turf Writers" and "Erected by the Public."

=== Will Rogers statues ===
Also among Wheeler's most famous work are his statues of famous humorist Will Rogers. Wheeler created three different statues of Will Rogers.

The first statue Wheeler did of Will Rogers (1936 written on the base) was done shortly after Will Rogers death in 1935. Wheeler made the statue, Will Rogers on his horse Soapsuds, hoping for it to be chosen as a memorial statue. Instead, a statue of Rogers by Jo Davidson was chosen to commemorate the famous entertainer. Wheeler made the 1/8 size statue into a bronze.

A second statue Wheeler did of Will Rogers was done in 1939, commissioned by Betty Rogers, Will's widow. The commissioned work was planned to be made into a full size and placed in Beverly Hills, but the full size never came to be. Wheeler made three plasters of the 1/4 size statue titled, "Will Rogers Astride Soapsuds." While working on a clay "sketch model" of the statue, Wheeler stayed on Jimmy Rogers's ranch for three weeks. and used Jimmy as a model for Will. Larger polychrome plasters of the sketch model were made circa 1941 while staying at the home of Betty and Will Rogers, in Pacific Palisades. One of these plasters resides in the Roger's home which today is a state park. The other of these plasters (1941 written on the base), was painted by renowned California painter, and friend of Wheeler, Victor Clyde Forsythe, and is kept in the Will Rogers Memorial Museum in Claremore, Oklahoma. A small 1/8 size bronze of this statue (1939 written on the base) is part of the permanent collection at Fort Christmas, in Christmas, FL. This 1/8 size bronze can also be seen in a 1943 short film, a Will Rogers Memorial Hospital appeal, starring Judy Garland, in which she sings "If I Forget You" by Irving Caesar.

Wheeler made a third statue of Will Rogers, "Will Rogers," a 12" tall bronze of the entertainer standing with rope in hand. 30 or less were said to have been cast in bronze circa 1980.

Wheeler's niece, Mary Ida Bass Shearhart, said about Wheeler, "My Uncle, James Hughlette "Tex" Wheeler, was a sculptor, seemed drawn to Will Rogers. He lived at the Rogers' ranch while doing several pieces of Will on his horse, "Soapsuds" never knowing they were related by blood "way back". She traces their common ancestry to a Cherokee woman, Millie Vann.

== Eight of Alhambra and Artist Alley ==
A significant chapter in Wheeler's artistic life unfolded in Alhambra, California, where he became part of a remarkable but lesser-known art colony. This colony was centered on Champion Place, a short, tree-lined street that ended in a cul-de-sac, just off Main Street where Alhambra becomes San Gabriel. This unassuming location, nicknamed "Artist Alley" or "Little Bohemia," was home to some of the most prominent names in American art during the 1920s and 1930s.

Wheeler was part of a group dubbed "The Eight of Alhambra," which included Norman Rockwell, Frank Tenney Johnson, Jack Wilkinson Smith, Eli Harvey, Victor Clythe Forsythe, Sam Hyde Harris, and Marjorie Reed. Unlike the more cohesive "The Eight" associated with the Ashcan School, Alhambra's Eight came from diverse backgrounds and worked in various art styles.

Wheeler's time in Alhambra allowed him to work alongside and learn from other distinguished artists. Frank Tenney Johnson, in particular, played a significant role in this artistic community. Johnson, considered the Western master and heir to the cowboy throne after Charles Marion Russell and Frederick Remington, had moved to Champion Place in 1926. When Johnson died in 1939, Wheeler used his studio to sculpt his best-known work, the life-size statue of Seabiscuit.

It is also reported that movie stars such as Tom Mix, Gloria Swanson, and Will Rogers, who was a friend of several of the artists, visited the colony. As well as artists Charles Marion Russell, J.R. Williams, Ed Borein, and Dean Cornwell.

== Arizona years and Quarter Horse racing connections ==
Wheeler spent significant time in Arizona between 1931 and 1950, where he developed close relationships with prominent horsemen and artists. He maintained a studio on the X9 / Casa Blanca ranch of J. Rukin Jelks, and was also close friends with Melville H. Haskell, both key figures in popularizing the sport of Quarter Horse racing. Wheeler first met Jelks in the late 1920s and visited his ranch as early as 1932. He may have modeled Jelks on his horse Wheeler is thought to have done at least four bronzes for Haskell, and he did at least three bronzes for Jelks, one of racing horse Queenie, and another of famous thorough bred sire Piggin String, and a horse named Rukin String. Circa 1943, famous photojournalist Alfred Einsenstaedt visited Jelks Ranch and photographed Wheeler at work on the Queenie sculpture, with Jelks and Queenie also in the photo. Wheeler also did an illustration of a cowboy on a horse facing a sign that says "Casa Blanca" and gave it to Rukin and Mary Jelks as a gift.

His friendship circle in Arizona included prominent Western figures such as the prolific "cowboy author" of Westerns, Walt Coburn and daily syndicated cartoonist cowboy cartoonist J.R. Williams who had 40 million readers by 1930, the latter of whom Wheeler portrayed in bronze mounted on his favorite horse, Old Lizzard. Western artists Ed Borein, Charles Marion Russell, Pete Martinez, and Victor Clyde Forsythe who was also one of "The Eight of Alhambra" were also visitors at Jelk's ranch. Perhaps Clyde introduced Wheeler to the Alhambra Artist community.

Wheeler commented about his time in Arizona, "It's a funny thing that everybody who has ever worked with cows thinks sorter alike, whether they live in Kissimmee or Tucson, Arizona. They talk pretty much the same. The life of a cowboy is about the same here and out West. They live in the saddle from dawn 'til dusk, only we do stop for lunch." Writing an obituary for Wheeler, Willard H. Porter wrote, "He enjoyed staying with these Arizona horseman. He enjoyed the companionship and he loved to sit and watch the good horseflesh, some of which he captured in bronze."

== Known Bronze Sculptures ==
Wheeler's work was not artistically or commercially well known to the general public as he worked mainly on assignment or commission for horseman and wealthy horse owners, and the resulting bronze was cast just once. Many of his works may still be with the families of the original owners.

Work	Material	Year	Size	Description
Howdy Boys	Bronze	1926	14" tall.	Cowboy in chaps on a horse waving. Tex remarked, "Was done when I was lonesome." In 1937 was the property of Miss Molly Garfield, granddaughter of President Garfield.
The Steer Bulldogger	Bronze			
Cowboy Fun	Bronze	1926	16" high.	A cowboy with one hand held high on a rearing horse. Inscribed "Cowboy Fun." Owned by Korner & Wood in 1927.
The Mix Up	Bronze	1926		A cowboy on a horse running into a steer. Owned by Dudley S. Blossom in 1927. C 1926 with the Valsuani Cire Perdue foundry seal and the artist's thumb print.
Ride Em Cowboy	Bronze			Cowboy on a bucking horse, left hand on the reigns, outstretched right hand holding hat, only horses front feet are on the ground. Horse tail bent. Owned by Miss Elizabeth Ireland in 1927.
Packhorse	Bronze			Cowboy loading a horse. Permanent Collection at Fort Christmas, FL.
A Pair of Jacks	Bronze			A foal and a rabbit. Permanent Collection at Fort Christmas, FL.
Stand back	Bronze			A mare protecting her foal. Permanent Collection at Fort Christmas.
The Hard Pull	Bronze	1927		A cowboy pulling a calf from a bog, but without the calf portrayed. Owned by Miss Elizabeth Ireland in 1927.
Pullin Bog	Bronze			perhaps Wheeler called The Hard Pull, "Pullin Bog" and they are the same.
Loosened Up	Bronze	1927		A cowboy with no hat, on a horse bucking with only back two legs on the ground. Round base.
Orphan Boy	Bronze	1927	7 5/8" tall.	A colt. Engraved Orphan Boy on the base.
The Orphan	Bronze	1928		A cowboy on a horse carrying a baby calf. Permanent Collection at Fort Christmas, FL.
Tail Shot	Bronze	1928		Polo Player
Molly Blossom	Bronze	1928		A woman sitting upright on a horse.
Mary Reynolds	Bronze	circa 1928		Race horse owned by W.N. Reynolds
Raw Material	Bronze	1928		
Sweet Briar	Bronze	1928		A stallion belonging to Mr. & Mrs. J.A. Wigmore. Inscribed "Sweet Briar"
Mrs Poe on Her Horse Mighty	Bronze			Mrs Poe on her horse jumping a fence. Pebble Hill collection.
Let'r Buck	Bronze	1929		perhaps was also called "Ride em cowboy"
Sunrise	Bronze	1929		A Hackney pony who won many blue ribbons. For Carl H. Hanna of Boston.
Mrs E.C. Higby	Bronze	1929		Mrs. Higby on her favorite mare
Mrs E.C. Higby	Bronze	1929		Mrs. Higby riding on a side saddle dressed in formal riding habit
Pep	Bronze	1929		A colt. Wheeler said he liked his Pep bronze better than his earlier "Orphan Boy."
Polo Player	Bronze	1929		Player with mallet high in the air
Following the Ball	Bronze			Two polo players
Russell Boy	Bronze	1929		Dan Hann's polo pony
The Storm	Bronze	1929		A cowboy and horse in a bad storm. The cowboys coat flying.
man on bucking horse	Bronze			A comboy with no hat, right hand on the reins, left hand at shoulder height, on a horse that is bucking with front right leg and left back leg kicked up in the air. Inscription on the base that might say H. Wheeler
A cowboy and his horse, also "Raw Material"	Bronze	1929		Cowboy beside his horse
Flop	Bronze	1929		A pony belonging to Miss Pansy Ireland of Cleveland
Two of a kind	Bronze	1930	14 1/4" tall.	Man and horse, sculpted in Paris. A cowboy with no hat, on a horse with an arched back and only the back two legs on the ground. Square base.
Dog Gone	Bronze	1930		Cowboy bustin a bronc. Perhaps also called "Bronc Twister."
First call to dinner	Bronze	1930		Mare and foal. Sculpted in Paris. Permanent Collection at Fort Christmas, FL.
Man Scent	Bronze			Horse smelling a cowboy hat. Permanent Collection at Fort Christmas, FL.
Hard Heads	Bronze	1931	12 1/2" high.	African-American on a mule.
Ridin Fool	Bronze			Cowboy on a horse with hat in hand and high in the air, on horse that's bucking with only its front two feet on the ground.
Jerry	Bronze		12 1/4" high.	Horse. Jerry inscribed on base. Stamped Roman Bronze Works NY.
The Bronc Twister	Bronze	1931		Cowboy wearing a hat, on a bucking horse with only back legs on the ground. Roundish base.
Emperor	Bronze			Braham bull belonging to Henry O. Partin of the Hart Bar Ranch in Florida.
The Steer Bulldogger	Bronze	circa 1934		
Buster	Bronze	circa 1934		
Trail Time	Bronze	circa 1934		
J.R. Williams	Bronze	1934		J.R. Williams on a horse.
Portait of Jinx	Bronze	1934	13 x 14 x 3 in	Standing horse. bronze; dark brown patina,
Captain Lawton	Bronze	1935	16 x 21 x 4 1/4 in.	Standing horse. 1935, patinated bronze, signed and dated with title to the terrace edge, with Antioch Art Foundry (Antioch, Ohio) stamp. The Estate of the late Peggy Augustus, Old Keswick, Virginia
Colt	Bronze	1935	6 1/2" tall	Standing horse
Scorpion	Bronze	1935	6 1/2" tall	colt, Standing horse
Cynthia on Mickey Mouse	Plaster cast	1935		
Will Rogers on Soapsuds	Bronze	1936		1/8 size of Will Rogers riding a horse. Base inscription includes 1936.
Lot of Whiff	Bronze			Last known owner, Valley National Bank of Arizona, Fine Arts Department, Phoenix, Arizona
Kayak II		circa 1938-39		1/4 sized of race horse with George Woolf riding in the Santa Anita Handicap. Commission by Charles S. Howard
Citation				Race horse. Commission by Calumet Farms.
Hunter	Bronze	1930's		Commission by George Humphrey, former Secretary of the Treasury.
Will Roges Astride Soapsuds	Polychrome Paster	1939	1/4 size.	Will Rogers on his horse. Three copies. Commission by Betty Rogers. Will Rogers State Park, Will Rogers Memorial Museum and Private Collector.
Portrait of a Pony	Bronze			Commission by Harvey Firestone
Stage Hand	Bronze			Race horse. Commission by Harvey Firestone
Bayard II	Bronze			Thoroughbred owned by Mel Haskell
Queenie	Bronze	1943		Quarter horse owned by Rukin Jelks, Jelks Ranch, Tucson, AZ.
Piggin String	Bronze			Thoroughbred horse owned by Rukin Jelks, Jelks Ranch, Tucson, AZ.
Rukin Jelks	Bronze			Quarter horse owned by Rukin Jelks, Jelks Ranch, Tucson, AZ.
Hereford Bull	Bronze			Bull owned by Barney York of Seven V Ranches, Prescott, AZ
Arizona Cowboy	Bronze			Cowboy in hat, sitting right on a horse that is standing still with tail pointed straight down. Cowboy has reins in right hand, left hand on saddle, is looking almost straight ahead and wearing chaps and tapaderos.
Will Rogers	Bronze		11 3/4 inches tall	Will Rogers standing with rope in hand.
Seabiscuit with Red Pollard riding	bronze	1940	table-top	Horse is walking with rider on top.
Seabiscuit	Bronze	1940-41	Full-size	race hours. Three copies: Santa Anita Park. National Museum of Racing and Hall of Fame, Ridgewood Ranch.
George Woolf	Bronze	1949	Full-size	George Woolf standing. Erected by the Public.
Noor	Bronze	1950	Full-size	Race horse owned by Charles S. Howard, and likely a commission by Howard. Two of these bronzes were shipped in Nov 9, 1954 to an unknown client.
Bust of a Male	Bronze	1950	10" tall	Bust of a man, possibly Tom Mix. dated 1950, foundry mark Cire Valsuani.

Citations for his known works".

== Personal life ==
Wheeler came from a family of three children, including an older brother, John Rex (1899–1900), who died in infancy, and a younger sister, Coralie (1903–1978). Wheeler was married twice and had one child. He was close friends in his adult life with J.R. Williams, whom he did a bronze of circa 1943.

Wheeler's first marriage was to Gloria Alice Kirschbaum on August 31, 1935, in Gates Mills, Ohio. His best man at the ceremony was William M. McVey. This marriage was short-lived, ending in divorce in 1936.

Wheeler lived and worked for multiple years in California / Arizona, circa 1931–1950, living on J. Rukin Jelk's ranch in Tucson, and Mell Haskell's Rincon ranch also in Tucson. He had a studio in Vail, AZ. And a studio in Alhambra, Ca. Later, he had a studio, The Boar's Nest, in Christmas, FL.

In 1940, Wheeler married for the second time to Lillian Simonton of Live Oak, Florida. They married in Arizona. Lillian was a school teacher and five years younger than Wheeler. It was reported that their romance dated back to their college days.

After being commissioned to do a sculpture of the late humorist, Will Rogers, by Will's widow Betty, Wheeler and his wife spent several months on the Rogers ranch. It was during this stay that their only child, a daughter named Betty, was born in 1941 on the Rogers Ranch. Betty was named after Betty Rogers. Betty Wheeler did not have any children of her own.

== Later years and legacy ==
World War II made it impossible for Wheeler to have his sculptures made into bronzes. He returned to Florida and made signs to earn a living. After WWII he began his sculpting work again in earnest, completing several pieces but work was scarce. Lillian was with him and returned to teaching school. 1943, Wheeler was struck by severe rheumatoid arthritis, which significantly impacted his work and health. He struggled with constant severe pain and turned to alcohol for relief. Despite these challenges, he continued to create. "He had arthritis everywhere but his hands," said his only daughter Betty.

Wheeler died in his studio, The Boar's Nest, on December 12, 1954, in Fort Christmas (now simply called Christmas), Florida, following a fatal heart attack brought on by his ongoing health issues. He is buried in the Fort Christmas Cemetery adjacent his brother, mother and father. His epitaph reads, "Cowboy Sculptor." After his death, the Boar's Nest burned down and with it many of Tex's molds and illustrations.

Wheeler's work is considered rare. His legacy lives on through his sculptures, which continue to capture the spirit of the American West and the beauty of equestrian life.

Willard H. Porter, writing in The Western Horseman magazine 15 years after Wheeler's death, summed up his impact: "Hughlette Wheeler, the cowboy-sculptor from the Sunshine State, was a genius... a great artist who portrayed horses and their actions with a brilliant style. He should not be forgotten."
