= Noor (horse) =

Irish-bred Thoroughbred racehorse

- Sire: Nasrullah
- Grandsire: Nearco
- Dam: Queen of Baghdad
- Damsire: Bahram
- Sex: Stallion
- Foaled: 1945
- Country: Ireland
- Colour: Black
- Breeder: HH Aga Khan III
- Owner: HH Aga Khan III; Charles S. Howard (from October 1949)
- Trainer: Frank Butters (1947–1948); Burley Parke (1949–1950)
- Record: 31: 12-6-6
- Earnings: $383,968

Major wins
- Bretby Nursery Handicap (1947); Diomed Stakes (1948); Great Foal Stakes (1948); Santa Anita Handicap (1950); San Juan Capistrano Handicap (1950); American Handicap (1950); Golden Gate Handicap (1950); Hollywood Gold Cup (1950)

Awards
- U.S. Champion Handicap Male Horse (1950)

Honours
- United States Racing Hall of Fame (2002) #69 - Top 100 U.S. Racehorses of the 20th Century
- Last updated on 5 November 2006

Noor (1945 – 16 November 1974) was an Irish-bred Thoroughbred racehorse Champion who competed successfully in the United Kingdom and the United States.

== Background ==
Given the Arabic name meaning "Light", Noor was sired by five-time U.S. leading sire Nasrullah. His damsire, Bahram, won the English Triple Crown in 1935.

== Racing career ==
Noor raced at ages two to four in England, meeting with modest success, including a third-place finish in Britain's most prestigious race, The Derby. During the 1949 racing season, he won only one minor race, and his owner sold him to the American Charles S. Howard, famous as the owner of the 1938 U.S. Horse of the Year, Seabiscuit. Howard's trainer, Burley E. Parke, brought Noor to Howard's Ridgewood Ranch in Willits, California, where patience and training transformed the temperamental thoroughbred's style of racing to American standards. Noor made the transition from running on resilient English turf courses to the hard dirt surfaces in the U.S. and by 1950, he was the dominant older horse in America, setting three world records and three track records while scoring victories over U.S. Triple Crown champion Citation in four out of their five encounters.

Famous for his come-from-behind stretch drives, in 1950 Noor finished the season with a record of 7–4–1 from his 12 starts. In his three years racing in England, he had earned less than $40,000 in total but in the U.S. in 1950 alone he earned $346,940. Noor twice defeated Assault, making him the first horse to ever defeat two U.S. Triple Crown champions. In capturing the Hollywood Gold Cup, he also beat 1950 U.S. Horse of the Year Hill Prince as well as 1949 Kentucky Derby winner Ponder. Noor's performance in 1950 earned him U.S. Champion Handicap Male Horse honors.

== Retirement and stud record ==
At the end of the 1950 racing season, the five-year-old horse was retired to stand at stud at Ridgewood Ranch but after the property was sold by the estate of Charles Howard, Noor was moved to son Lindsay Howard's Binglin Stable in Moorpark, California.

Noor was moved again at the age of 19 to Frank Knoop's Loma Rica Ranch in Grass Valley, California. He died on 16 November 1974 at the age of 29. In 2002, he was inducted into the United States' National Museum of Racing and Hall of Fame.

A mixed-use business park and residential development was planned for the former Loma Rica Ranch. In March 2010, Noor's grave was located and an effort was mounted to ensure that his remains were not disturbed. In August 2011, Noor's remains were exhumed for reburial in Kentucky. They were reinterred on 31 August 2011 at Old Friends Equine in Georgetown, KY. Charlotte Farmer, the woman who led the effort to bring Noor's remains from California to Kentucky, attended.
