= Van Ostrand =

Van Ostrand is a surname. Notable people with the surname include:

- Jimmy Van Ostrand (born 1984), Canadian baseball player
- Maggie Van Ostrand, American humorist and journalist
