= The Story of Seabiscuit =

1949 film by David Butler

- Directed by: David Butler
- Written by: John Taintor Foote
- Produced by: William Jacobs
- Starring: Shirley Temple; Barry Fitzgerald; Lon McCallister
- Cinematography: Wilfred M. Cline
- Edited by: Irene Morra
- Music by: David Buttolph
- Color process: Technicolor
- Production company: Warner Bros. Pictures
- Distributed by: Warner Bros. Pictures
- Release date: November 12, 1949
- Running time: 98 minutes
- Country: United States
- Language: English
- Budget: $700,000 (est.)

The Story of Seabiscuit is a 1949 American drama film directed by David Butler and starring Shirley Temple and Barry Fitzgerald in a semi-fictionalized account of racehorse Seabiscuit, the top money winner up to the 1940s. The screenplay was written by John Taintor Foote; it changes the names of the people involved but uses the racehorses' real names.

Though shot in Technicolor, the film incorporates actual black-and-white and color footage of Seabiscuit in races, including the 1940 Santa Anita Handicap and the 1938 match race against rival War Admiral, which is still considered by many to be the greatest horse race of all time.

== Plot ==
The film is a fictionalized account of the career of the 1930s racehorse Seabiscuit (1933–1947), with a subplot involving the romance between the niece (Temple) of a horse trainer (Fitzgerald) and a jockey (Lon McCallister).

== Cast ==
- Shirley Temple as Margaret O'Hara
- Barry Fitzgerald as trainer Sean O'Hara
- Lon McCallister as jockey Ted Knowles
- Rosemary DeCamp as Mrs. Charles S. Howard
- Donald MacBride as George Carson
- Pierre Watkin as Charles S. Howard
- William Forrest as Thomas Milford
- Claudia Barrett as a nurse (uncredited)

== Production notes ==
In July 1940 David Butler was taking technicolor footage of Seabiscuit for a film called Blood Will Tell for RKO. This included footage of Seabiscuit's win at Santa Anita against Kayak after Seabiscuit had recovered from a ruptured suspensory ligament. The cast was to include Lucille Ball, Edna May Oliver and Leon Errol. Dick Powell was going to play the lead then John Wayne; the title was changed to True to Form. Wayne fell out and Randolph Scott and James Craig were considered for the film. Eventually it was not made.

Butler was friends with Charles Howard. A common friend, Phil Hall, told Butler that Howard was ill and would love to see a film made out of Seabiscuit. Butler approached Jack Warner, who was a horse owner, and pitched the project, saying Barry Fitzgerald would be ideal for the role of Tom Smith the trainer.

In August 1947 Warner Bros. Pictures announced they had done a deal with C. S. Howard, owner of the horse, to make The Story of Seabiscuit. Butler would direct in color from a scenario which included material from Howard. Butler got John Traintor Foote, who wrote the horse riding film Kentucky, to write the script. In November the studio said Foote had written a script and that Barry Fitzgerald would play the lead alongside Geraldine Brooks, with William Jacobs to produce and filming to begin in December.

However filming was delayed and Brooks dropped out. In March 1949, Shirley Temple and Lon McAllister were signed to co star alongside Fitzgerald, and the title was Always Sweethearts. The same month Warners completed a deal with RKO worth a reported $25,000 for the 10,000 feet of color footage of Seabiscuit shot in 1940.

Filming started in April 1949. Temple was coached in an Irish accent by Arthur Shields. The role of Seabiscuit was played by two of his children, Sea Sovereign and Sea Gamble.

The bulk of the film was shot at Northridge Farms, a development established by Barbara Stanwyck and her then agent Zeppo Marx, then sold to a syndicate. According to one report the Farm is "used pretty generally when Hollywood is trying to look like the blue grass country of Kentucky." It was also shot at Santa Anita, Burns Park and Burns Ranch in Woodland Hills.

The part of the film where Seabiscuit races War Admiral was shown in black and white because Butler could only source black and white news footage of that race.

Butler says a copy of the finished film was sent to Howard in Hawaii. "He was very sick there, but he got a big kick out of it", said Butler. "That was one of the nicest things that ever happened to him."

The film's title was changed from Always Sweethearts to The Story of Seabiscuit.

== Reception ==
=== Box office ===
According to Butler "the picture caught on. In Europe it did the best business of any Warner picture that year. We had all the things in it that happened in Seabiscuit's life. The picture runs on television all the time. It didn't cost much to make – about $700,000 – and it made a fortune."

=== Critical ===
The New York Times reviewer panned the film, stating, "the odds are that Seabiscuit's screen saga will prove an also-ran" and characterizing the subplot as "one of the season's dullest romances". AMC critic Christopher Null agreed, writing, "The only actual reason to watch this film ... is the black and white footage of Seabiscuit's actual races".

== See also ==
- Shirley Temple filmography
- List of films about horses
- List of films about horse racing
- Seabiscuit, 2003 film

== Notes ==
- Butler, David (1993). David Butler. Directors Guild of America. ISBN 9780810827059.
