= Ridgewood Summit =

Mountain pass in California, U.S.

Coordinates: 39.3407°N 123.3167°W

Ridgewood Summit is a low mountain pass in Mendocino County, California, traversed by U.S. Route 101 at an altitude of 1,956 feet (596 m). It crosses the Mendocino Range, connecting Ukiah and the watershed of the Russian River, on the south of the pass, to Willits and the watershed of the Eel River on the north. It is the highest pass on U.S. Route 101 in California. Greenough Ridge and Irene Peak rise to the west of the pass. The spur of the Mendocino Range to the east of the pass is called the Laughlin Range.

Ridgewood Ranch, the last resting place of racehorse Seabiscuit, lies immediately to the south of the pass, in the Walker Valley.

A large rock near the pass is called Black Bart Rock. However, although Black Bart twice robbed stagecoaches on the road from Willits to Ukiah, in October 1878 and again in June 1882, he did so from a smaller rock near Forsythe Creek, to the south of the pass on its descent to Ukiah, rather than on the pass itself. The rock he used has since been blasted away. Another bandit, John Schneider, held up another stagecoach in the pass in 1896; it was called "robber's pass" as a consequence of these frequent robberies.
