= Leslie Pope =

American set decorator (1954–2020)

- Born: Leslie Ann Pope; June 2, 1954; Bowling Green, Kentucky, U.S.
- Died: May 6, 2020 (aged 65); Venice, California, U.S.
- Other name: Leslie A. Pope
- Occupation: Set decorator
- Years active: 1982-2019
- Relatives: Bill Pope (brother)

Leslie Pope (June 2, 1954 – May 6, 2020) was an American set decorator who was nominated at the 76th Academy Awards for her work on the 2003 film Seabiscuit in the category of Best Art Direction. Her nomination was shared with Jeannine Oppewall.

Pope was born in Bowling Green, Kentucky. She was an alumna of Antioch College, where she received a B.A. in biology.

== Selected filmography ==
- After Hours (1985)
- Angel Heart (1987)
- Ironweed (1987)
- Crocodile Dundee II (1988)
- The Prince of Tides (1991)
- Carlito's Way (1993)
- The Juror (1996)
- Donnie Brasco (1997)
- In & Out (1997)
- The Astronaut's Wife (1999)
- Flawless (1999)
- The Family Man (2000)
- Bad Company (2002)
- Catch Me If You Can (2002)
- S1m0ne (2002)
- Seabiscuit (2003)
- Spanglish (2004)
- Failure to Launch (2006)
- Lions for Lambs (2007)
- Spider-Man 3 (2007)
- Seven Pounds (2008)
- Funny People (2009)
- Get Him to the Greek (2010)
- The Amazing Spider-Man (2012)
- Django Unchained (2012)
- This Is 40 (2012)
- Captain America: The Winter Soldier (2014)
- Ant-Man (2015)
- Ghostbusters (2016)
- Avengers: Infinity War (2018)
- Avengers: Endgame (2019)
