= Seabiscuit (film) =

- International theatrical release poster
- Directed by: Gary Ross
- Screenplay by: Gary Ross
- Based on: Seabiscuit: An American Legend by Laura Hillenbrand
- Produced by: Kathleen Kennedy; Frank Marshall; Gary Ross; Jane Sindell
- Starring: Tobey Maguire; Jeff Bridges; Chris Cooper; Elizabeth Banks; Gary Stevens; William H. Macy
- Cinematography: John Schwartzman
- Edited by: William Goldenberg
- Music by: Randy Newman
- Production companies: DreamWorks Pictures; Spyglass Entertainment; The Kennedy/Marshall Company; Larger Than Life Productions
- Distributed by: Universal Pictures (North America); Spyglass International (International)
- Release date: July 25, 2003
- Running time: 140 minutes
- Country: United States
- Language: English
- Budget: $87 million
- Box office: $148.3 million

Seabiscuit is a 2003 American historical sports drama film co-produced, written and directed by Gary Ross and based on the best-selling 1999 non-fiction book Seabiscuit: An American Legend by Laura Hillenbrand. The film stars Tobey Maguire, Jeff Bridges, Chris Cooper, Elizabeth Banks, Gary Stevens, and William H. Macy and is loosely based on the life and racing career of Seabiscuit, an undersized and overlooked Thoroughbred race horse, whose unexpected successes made him a hugely popular media sensation in the United States during the Great Depression.

Seabiscuit was released by Universal Pictures on July 25, 2003. The film received positive reviews from critics and grossed $148.3 million against an $87 million budget. At the 76th Academy Awards, Seabiscuit received seven nominations, including Best Picture, but ultimately lost all seven, including six to The Lord of the Rings: The Return of the King.

== Plot ==
In the early 20th century, as America enters the automobile age, Charles S. Howard opens a bicycle shop in San Francisco. He is soon selling automobiles, becoming the largest car dealer in California and one of the Bay Area's richest men. In the wake of the Great Depression, 16-year-old Canadian John "Red" Pollard's family is financially ruined, and he is sent to live with a horse trainer. Years pass and Pollard becomes a jockey, but amateur boxing leaves him blind in one eye.

After their young son is killed in an automobile accident, Howard's wife leaves him. He obtains a divorce in Mexico, where Pollard is struggling to make his mark as a jockey. Howard meets and marries Marcela Zabala. When he acquires a stable of racehorses, he hires itinerant horseman Tom Smith as his trainer. Smith convinces him to buy a colt called Seabiscuit. Though a grandson of the great Man o' War and trained by the renowned James E. Fitzsimmons, Seabiscuit is viewed as small, lazy, and unmanageable. Smith witnesses Pollard's similarly temperamental spirit, and hires him as Seabiscuit's jockey.

Under Smith's innovative training, Seabiscuit becomes the most successful racehorse on the West Coast and an underdog hero to the public. Howard issues a challenge to Samuel D. Riddle, owner of the East Coast champion and Triple Crown-winning racehorse War Admiral, but Riddle dismisses California racing as inferior. In the prestigious Santa Anita Handicap, Seabiscuit takes the lead, but Pollard's impaired vision prevents him from noticing another horse surging up on the outside. Losing by a nose, Pollard admits his partial blindness to Smith.

Howard declares that Pollard will remain Seabiscuit's jockey, and rallies public support for a match race with War Admiral. Riddle agrees, on the condition that they race with a rope and bell instead of a starting gate. With Seabiscuit at a disadvantage, Smith trains the horse to break fast at the sound of the bell. As the race approaches, Pollard severely fractures his leg in a riding accident. Informed he may never walk again, let alone ride, he recommends that his friend and skilled jockey George Woolf ride Seabiscuit, advising him on the horse's handling and behavior from his hospital bed.

The highly anticipated "race of the century" draws a sellout crowd, with 40 million more people listening on the radio. Seabiscuit takes an early lead until nearing the far turn; following Pollard's advice, Woolf slows Seabiscuit, allowing War Admiral to match Seabicuit's stride. Seabiscuit looks War Admiral in the eye before surging ahead and winning by four lengths, enthralling the nation. A few months later, Seabiscuit injures his leg. Pollard, still recovering from his own injury, tends to the horse as they both heal. When Seabiscuit is fit enough to race again, Howard brings him back to the Santa Anita Handicap; he is reluctant to allow Pollard to ride and risk crippling himself for life. At the urging of Woolf and Marcela, Howard relents.

Pollard, using a self-made leg brace, discovers Woolf is also in the race on a new mount. Seabiscuit drops far behind the field; Woolf slows and pulls alongside Pollard, allowing Seabiscuit a good look at Woolf's mount. With Woolf's encouragement, Seabiscuit surges ahead. Heading for the finish line several lengths ahead, Pollard's voiceover explains that Seabiscuit was not merely a broken-down horse that three men fixed, but that Seabiscuit fixed them and, in a way, they fixed one another.

== Cast ==
- Tobey Maguire as John "Red" Pollard
  - Michael Angarano as Young John "Red" Pollard
- Jeff Bridges as Charles S. Howard
- Chris Cooper as Tom Smith
- Elizabeth Banks as Marcela Zabala-Howard
- Gary Stevens as George Woolf
- William H. Macy as "Tick Tock" McLaughlin
- Kingston DuCoeur as Sam
- Eddie Jones as Samuel Riddle
- Ed Lauter as Charles Strub
- Michael O'Neill as Mr. Pollard
- Royce D. Applegate as Dutch Doogan
- Annie Corley as Mrs. Pollard
- Valerie Mahaffey as Annie Howard
- David McCullough as The Narrator

== Production ==
The film was shot at Santa Anita Park in Arcadia, California, Keeneland Race Course in Lexington, Kentucky and Saratoga Race Course in Saratoga Springs, New York. Keeneland doubled for Pimlico Race Course, because Pimlico had dramatically changed physically since Seabiscuit's time. Additional filming took place in Hidden Valley, California. The film also marks a second collaboration between director Gary Ross and actors Tobey Maguire and William H. Macy, who worked together in Ross's 1998 film Pleasantville, while Maguire and Elizabeth Banks both worked together in Sam Raimi's Spider-Man (2002).

== Release ==
Seabiscuit was released on July 25, 2003. Universal Pictures, DreamWorks Pictures and Spyglass Entertainment are listed as the joint copyright holders of the film, with Universal distributing the film in the United States and Canada. DreamWorks Pictures through United International Pictures handled distribution in Germany, Scandinavia, and Spain, while Spyglass Entertainment took all other territories. Japanese theatrical distribution was handled by UIP separately from the DreamWorks/Universal deal, while Pony Canyon handled VHS and DVD rights, with Buena Vista International purchasing distribution rights in all other territories. Paramount Pictures inherited DreamWorks' distribution rights for the film when its parent company Viacom purchased the studio for $1.6 billion in February 2006.

== Reception ==
=== Critical response ===
On Rotten Tomatoes, the film has an approval rating of 77% based on 206 reviews with an average rating of 7.5/10. The website's critical consensus reads, "A life-affirming, if saccharine, epic treatment of a spirit-lifting figure in sports history". On Metacritic, the film has a weighted average score of 72 out of 100, based on 43 critics, indicating "generally favorable reviews". Audiences surveyed by CinemaScore gave the film an average grade of "A" on a scale of A to F.

Roger Ebert of the Chicago Sun-Times gave the film 3.5 stars out of 4, and wrote: "The movie's races are thrilling because they must be thrilling; there's no way for the movie to miss on those, but writer-director Gary Ross and his cinematographer, John Schwartzman, get amazingly close to the action."

=== Accolades ===
Group	Category	Recipient	Result
ASCAP Film and Television Music Awards	Top Box Office Films	Randy Newman	Won
76th Academy Awards	Best Picture	Kathleen Kennedy, Frank Marshall and Gary Ross	Nominated
76th Academy Awards	Best Writing (Adapted Screenplay)	Gary Ross	Nominated
76th Academy Awards	Best Art Direction	Art Direction: Jeannine Oppewall; Set Decoration: Leslie Pope	Nominated
76th Academy Awards	Best Cinematography	John Schwartzman	Nominated
76th Academy Awards	Best Costume Design	Judianna Makovsky	Nominated
76th Academy Awards	Best Film Editing	William Goldenberg	Nominated
76th Academy Awards	Best Sound Mixing	Andy Nelson, Anna Behlmer and Tod A. Maitland	Nominated
54th ACE Eddie Awards	Best Edited Feature Film – Dramatic	William Goldenberg	Nominated
2003 American Society of Cinematographers Awards	Outstanding Achievement in Cinematography in Theatrical Releases	John Schwartzman	Won
Broadcast Film Critics Association Awards 2003	Best Film		Nominated
Broadcast Film Critics Association Awards 2003	Best Screenplay	Gary Ross	Nominated
Directors Guild of America Awards 2003	Outstanding Directing – Feature Film	Gary Ross	Nominated
61st Golden Globe Awards	Golden Globe Award for Best Motion Picture – Drama		Nominated
61st Golden Globe Awards	Golden Globe Award for Best Supporting Actor – Motion Picture	William H. Macy	Nominated
Satellite Awards 2003	Best Supporting Actor – Motion Picture	Jeff Bridges	Nominated
Satellite Awards 2003	Best Art Direction and Production Design		Nominated
Satellite Awards 2003	Best Cinematography	John Schwartzman	Nominated
Satellite Awards 2003	Best Costume Design	Judianna Makovsky	Nominated
Satellite Awards 2003	Best Editing	William Goldenberg	Nominated
Satellite Awards 2003	Best Original Score	Randy Newman	Nominated
Satellite Awards 2003	Best Adapted Screenplay	Gary Ross	Nominated
Satellite Awards 2003	Best Sound		Nominated
10th Screen Actors Guild Awards	Outstanding Performance by a Male Actor in a Supporting Role	Chris Cooper	Nominated
10th Screen Actors Guild Awards	Outstanding Performance by a Cast in a Motion Picture	Elizabeth Banks, Jeff Bridges, Chris Cooper, William H. Macy, Tobey Maguire, and Gary Stevens	Nominated
Writers Guild of America Awards 2003	Best Adapted Screenplay	Gary Ross	Nominated

The film is recognized by American Film Institute in these lists:

- 2006: AFI's 100 Years...100 Cheers – #50

== See also ==
- List of films about horses
- List of films about horse racing
- The Story of Seabiscuit, 1949 film
