= Sea Sovereign =

American Thoroughbred racehorse

- Sire: Seabiscuit
- Dam: Queen Helen
- Sex: Stallion
- Country: United States
- Color: Bay
- Breeder: Charles Howard
- Owner: Charles Howard
- Record: 8:3-2-0
- Earnings: $34,070

Major wins
- Santa Catalina Handicap (1945)

Sea Sovereign was an American Thoroughbred stallion racehorse foaled in 1942, sired by 1930s winner Seabiscuit, for owner Charles Howard. Although Sea Sovereign achieved moderate success as a racehorse, he is most famous for being part of the line sired by Seabiscuit. The fine lines of Sea Sovereign's posture, along with his light-bay coloring, resulted in the horse appearing in the 1949 Shirley Temple film The Story of Seabiscuit, to portray his sire.

== Background ==
Sea Sovereign was foaled in 1942, sired by Seabiscuit, who was born on May 23, 1933, in Lexington, Kentucky, and was among the most famous race horses of the century. Both horses were in a line of pedigree descended from Man o' War. Seabiscuit had been mated over one hundred times successfully, though none of his foals turned out to be extraordinary runners. Sea Sovereign's mother was Queen Helen by Light Brigade.

One account of Seabiscuit's life is depicted in a Shirley Temple film from 1949 titled The Story of Seabiscuit, though it was Sea Sovereign who portrayed Seabiscuit. The film also included archival racetrack footage which showed the actual Seabiscuit racing in competition.

Sea Sovereign was also the great-grandson of Man o' War (who appeared in a separate, 1925 film titled Kentucky Pride).

== Racing career ==
Sea Sovereign had a very moderate and very brief career as a racehorse. He made eight starts with three firsts and $34,070 in earnings. The most notable win came in the Santa Catalina Handicap in 1945.

== Stud career ==
Very little is known of the subsequent career of Sea Sovereign, and the principal interest in the horse after a moderately successfully racing career appears to be as part of the study of the stud career of Seabiscuit.
