= John Taintor Foote =

American dramatist

- John Taintor Foote
- Born: March 29, 1881; Leadville, Colorado, United States
- Died: January 28, 1950 (aged 68); Los Angeles, California, United States
- Occupation: Writer
- Years active: 1913–1949
- Spouse: Jessica Todhunter Foote
- Children: 2

John Taintor Foote (March 29, 1881 – January 28, 1950) was an American novelist, playwright, short-story writer, and screenwriter.

Foote studied at Kenyon Military Academy, Gambier, Ohio. He began as a writer of sporting stories. His first story was published in The American Magazine in 1913. He wrote horse stories featuring the roguish track character Blister Jones, and the story upon which the Alfred Hitchcock film Notorious is loosely based. He also wrote or collaborated on five plays, among them the blackface comedy Toby's Bow (1919, made into a film the same year) and the dramas Tight Britches (1934), and Julie the Great (1936).

Foote came to Hollywood in 1938 to work on the screenplay of his book The Look of Eagles, which was retitled Kentucky, starred Loretta Young, and won an Academy Award for Walter Brennan. Foote's subsequent scripts included The Mark of Zorro, Broadway Serenade, Swanee River, The Story of Seabiscuit and The Great Dan Patch.

Foote is buried at Hollywood Forever Cemetery in Los Angeles.
