= Maggie Van Ostrand =

American humorist (1933–2026)

Margaret Van Ostrand (née Rinhard; June 1, 1933 – January 26, 2026) was an American humorist best known for her newspaper column, which appeared in the United States, Mexico and Canada. She is also known within the entertainment industry for ghostwriting satire and stand-up comedy, and ghosting for television sitcoms.

Van Ostrand was a regular contributor to the Chicago Tribune, and her articles have appeared in the Boston Globe, Amarillo Globe-News, Newsday, and other publications.

In 1998, 2001, 2003, and 2004 she received Outstanding Literary Achievement awards and, in 2002, Best Article of the Year award from two English-language Mexican publications. In 2004 she was recognized as Strike Force Member of the Year by the National Society of Newspaper Columnists.

Van Ostrand appeared on network television news in support of a postage stamp featuring the thoroughbred racehorse Seabiscuit, as keynote speaker at conferences nationwide, and on radio, as a Woman of Significance, discussing Mexico. She also appeared in a satirical documentary on emigration, based partly on one of her columns, produced by two award-winners, Abraham Osuna and M.K. Asante, Jr., the latter having just completed a film on Kwanzaa narrated by and co-written with renowned poet Maya Angelou.

She was a member of the following organizations: National Society of Newspaper Columnists, Society of Women Writers and Journalists, U.K., and Erma Bombeck Humor Writers Workshop.

Van Ostrand was a judge of the Erma Bombeck Writers' Competition from 2004, and in 2007 served as a judge of the Arizona Press Club's Journalism Award. Her essay on the origin of the word "gringo" appears in Stanford University's World Association of International Studies, January 2006.

== Career ==
Van Ostrand's writing career began with the liner notes for a Roger Miller album, and she began writing professionally upon the death of her friend and mentor Mark Goodson, for whose show Trivia Trap she was head writer. Other Mark Goodson game shows on which she worked in varying capacities were Card Sharks, The Price Is Right, Family Feud, To Tell The Truth (1990–91) and That's My Line (reality show).

In 1978 she was the theatrical agent instrumental in galvanizing the acting career of Wilford Brimley. She has also worked with entertainment management which represented the careers of Andy Williams, Mary Tyler Moore, and Bob Newhart.

== Death ==
Van Ostrand died on January 26, 2026, at the age of 92.

== Quotes ==
- "The way to a man's heart is through his stomach. The way to a woman's is through her ears."
- "Women want men to respect our whims of iron."
- "Not even Harvey Weinstein understands why Roman numerals are used at the end of movies."
- "Make a terrorist stand all day long in four-inch heels. If he doesn't give up everything he knows after that, he's probably already dead."
- "There are two indisputable indications of uncommon bravery. The first is when the military earn their medals, and the second is when the moms earn their wrinkles."
- "Guilt is indispensable to a mother. It's as important as football, and as easily applied as lipstick."
- "Take the fear from in front of you where it inhibits, and place it behind you where it impels."
- "With the abundance of room and people scents available today, about the only thing that smells the same as it always did is the end of the nozzle at a gas pump."
- "He's so manly, he sweats diesel fuel."
