= Lindsay C. Howard =

American sportsman

Lindsay Howard
- Born: March 31, 1904; San Francisco, California, U.S.
- Died: September 6, 1971 (aged 67); Moorpark, California, U.S.
- Occupation: Sportsman
- Spouses: Anita Zabala (m. 1925; div. 1938) Judith Barrett (m. 1940; div. 1952)
- Children: 5
- Parent(s): Charles S. Howard; Fannie May Howard

Lindsay Coleman Howard (March 31, 1904 – September 6, 1971) was an American sportsman.

== Early life ==
Lindsay was born on March 31, 1904, in San Francisco, California. He was the son of Fannie May Howard and Charles S. Howard, a prominent businessman and thoroughbred racehorse owner. His siblings were Charles Howard Jr., Robert Stewart Howard, and Frank R. Howard.

Howard served with the United States Army, rising to the rank of captain.

== Polo and thoroughbred racing ==
Lindsay Howard began riding horses at a young age and by the early 1930s had developed into a top class polo player. He captained the San Mateo Hurricanes that played in the Pacific Coast Inter-circuit Cup Polo Championship against such teams as the Midwick Country Club, captained by Neil McCarthy. Lindsay Howard and his brother Robert frequently played matches in Argentina, the polo capital of the world, and they and friend Bing Crosby decided to establish "Caballeriza Binglin Stock Farm" near Buenos Aires where they purchased a number of locally bred horses and shipped them back to the United States.

In the latter part of the 1930s. Lindsay Howard became nationally known when he and Bing Crosby bought and raced horses together under the name Binglin Stable, at the same time as his father Charles Howard owned the superstar runner, Seabiscuit. In 1939, Lindsay Howard took over as trainer of the Binglin racing stable. The Binglin Stable partnership came to an end in 1953 as a result of a liquidation of assets by Bing Crosby in order to raise the funds necessary to pay the federal and state inheritance taxes on his deceased wife's estate.

== Personal life ==
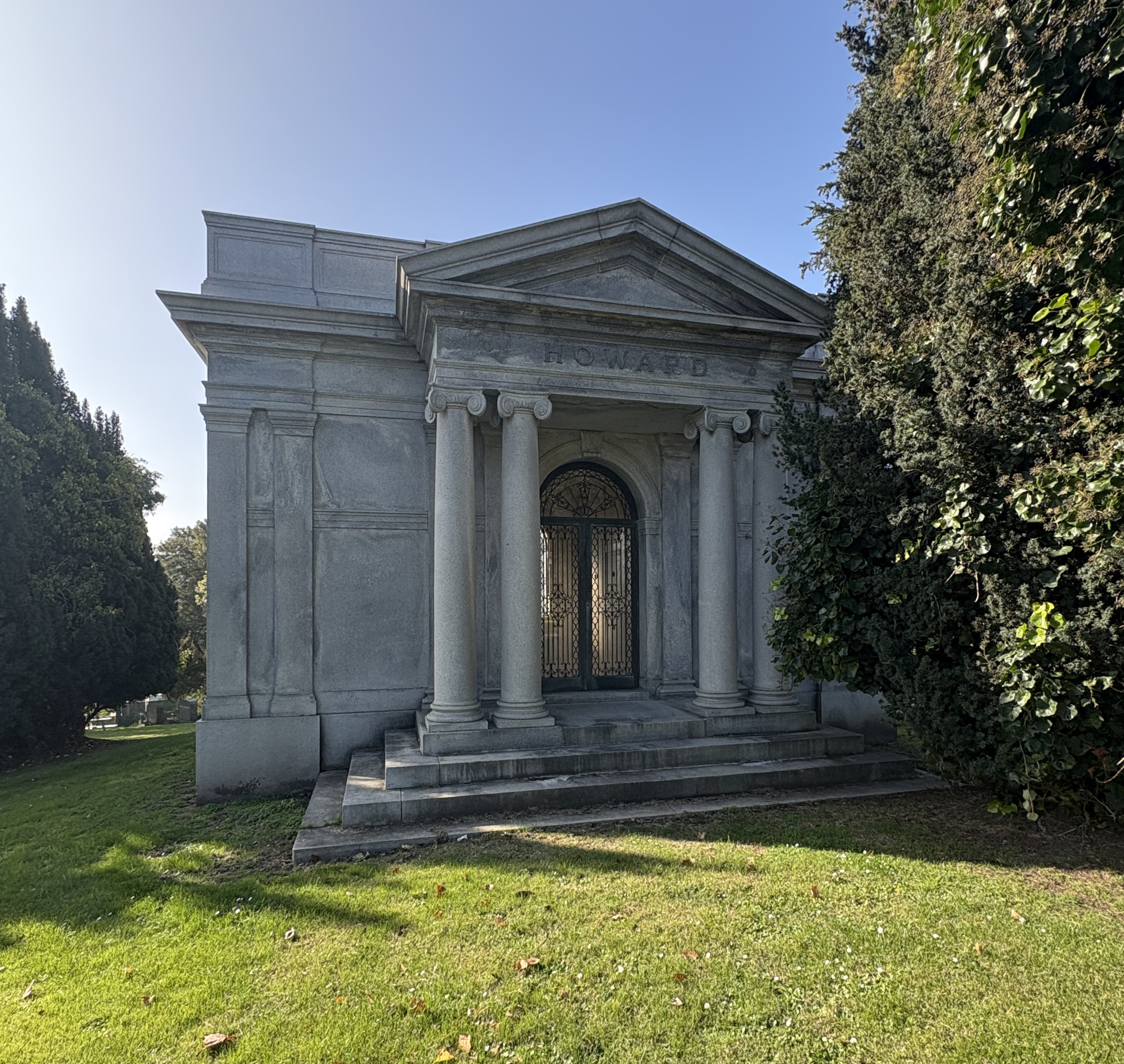
Howard mausoleum at Cypress Lawn Memorial Park

In 1925, Lindsay Howard married Anita Zabala of Salinas, California, a descendant of one of California's first Spanish families, and sister to Marcela Zabala, second wife of his father Charles S. Howard. The couple had three (Mary, Lindsay Jr, and Peter) children before divorcing in 1938. The divorce involved much bitterness and on December 13, 1943, Lindsay Howard faced a court martial for conduct unbecoming an officer. The charges were brought against him a result of his missed alimony payments but in the military trial he was acquitted. Anita Howard remarried to George Vanderbilt in 1946.

In 1940, Lindsay Howard married a second time to actress Judith Barrett (1909–2000) with whom he had two children before their much publicized divorce in 1952.

Lindsay Howard died in 1971 at age sixty-seven at his home in Moorpark, California, and was interred at Cypress Lawn Memorial Park in Colma.
