= Fort Christmas =

Fort in Florida, United States

Coordinates: 28.5623°N 81.0215°W

Fort Christmas was built in present-day Christmas, Florida during the Second Seminole War. Construction began on December 25, 1837, with the arrival of 2,000 U.S. Army soldiers and Alabama volunteers.

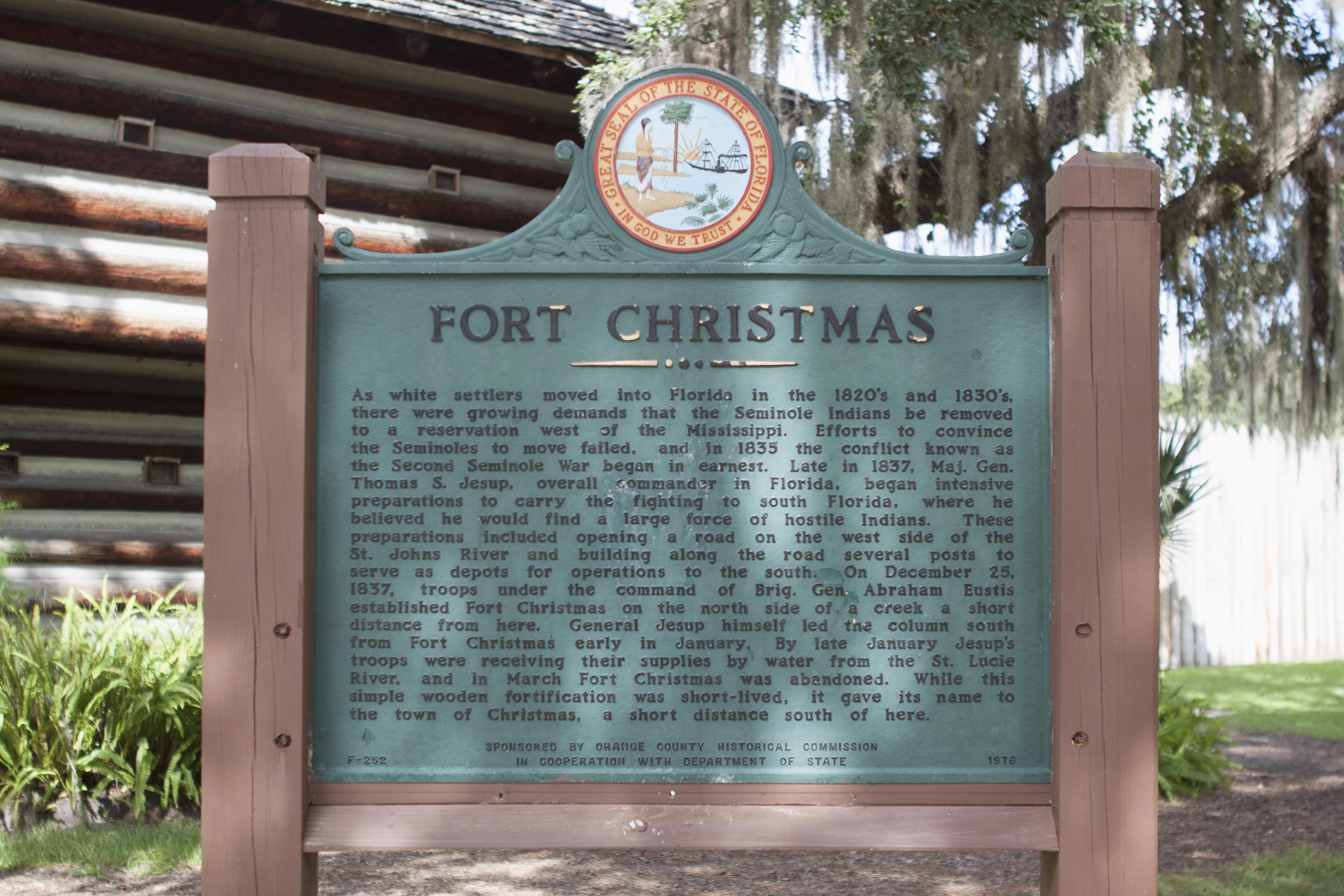
Fort Christmas Historical Park - Historical Marker

== Seminole War Army Post ==
2,000 U.S. Army Soldiers and Alabama militiamen, 1000 horses, and 70 wagons led by Brigadier General Abraham Eustis arrived at the location of Ft. Christmas on 25 December 1837. The Fort was built in just over week and would become one of 200 such installations built between 1835 and 1847 as part of the Second Seminole War. A fixed garrison of two companies would be maintained at the location until the fort was abandoned in 1845 with the conclusion of the Second Seminole War.

== Fort Christmas Historical Park ==
A full-scale replica of Fort Christmas was built by Orange County Parks and Recreation, in cooperation with the Fort Christmas Historical Society in the late 1970s; it was dedicated in 1977. Located just south of Christmas Creek, the site is probably less than 1 mile (1.6 km) from the location of the original fort.

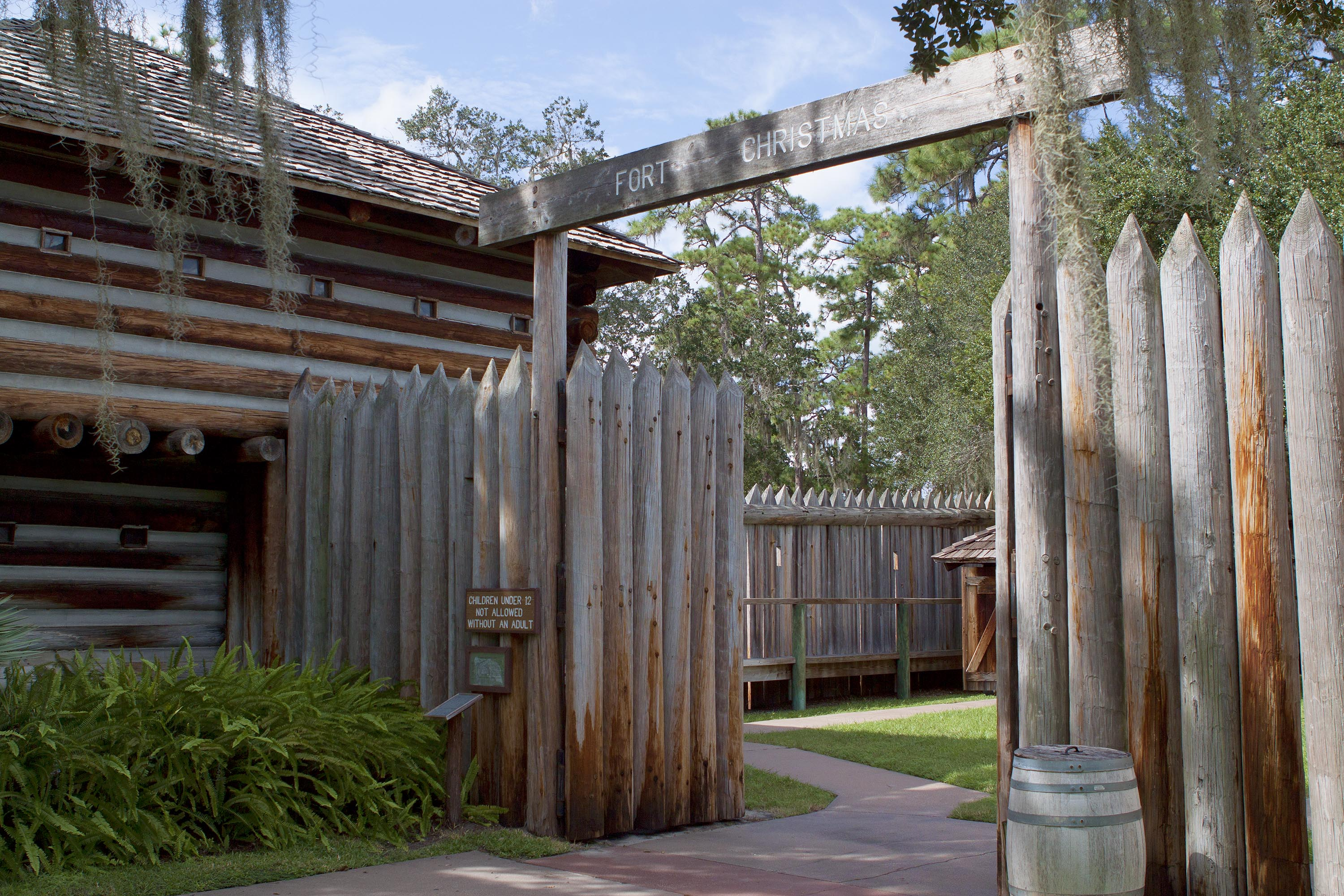
Fort Christmas historical Park - Fort Entrance

A small museum within the walls of the re-created fort displays US military, Seminole Indian and pioneer artifacts dating from the Seminole War period, including weapons, clothing, tools, household appliances and other items. In addition to the life-size replica of the fort, the park also features a growing number of restored "Florida Cracker" houses and farm buildings furnished with original and reproduction period pieces that show rural Florida life from the 1870s through the 1930s.

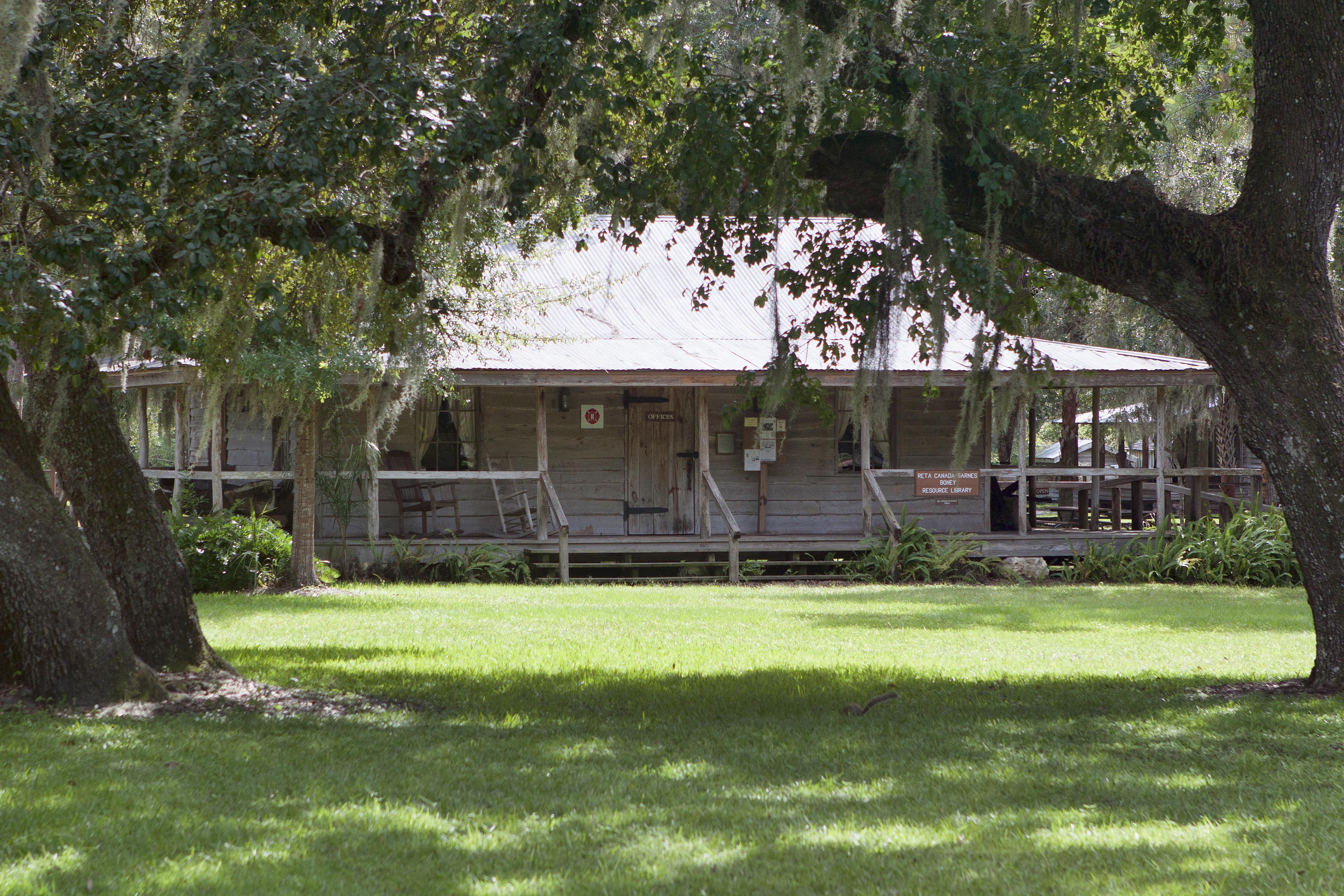
Fort Christmas Historical Park - Florida Cracker Home

Other restored structures in the park include a 1906 school and its lunch room.

Fort Christmas Park has picnic areas as well as facilities for baseball, basketball, tennis and a children's playground. The park hosts a number of events each year, including the annual "Cracker Christmas" in December and a bluegrass music festival in late March. The Fort Christmas Historical Park is operated by the Fort Christmas Historical Society and Orange County Parks and Recreation.
