= Christmas, Florida =

Unincorporated area in Florida, US

- Census-designated place
- Location in Orange County and the state of Florida
- Coordinates: 28°33′32″N 81°00′08″W
- Country: United States
- State: Florida
- County: Orange

Area
  - Total: 45.22 sq mi (117.13 km^{2})
  - Land: 45.21 sq mi (117.10 km^{2})
  - Water: 0.012 sq mi (0.03 km^{2})
- Elevation: 52 ft (16 m)

Population (2020)
  - Total: 2,439
  - Density: 53.9/sq mi (20.83/km^{2})
- Time zone: UTC-5 (Eastern (EST))
  - Summer (DST): UTC-4 (EDT)
- ZIP code: 32709
- Area codes: 407, 689, 321
- FIPS code: 12-12250
- GNIS feature ID: 2402771

Christmas is an unincorporated area and census-designated place in Orange County, Florida, United States. It is part of Greater Orlando.

As of the 2020 census, Christmas had a population of 2,439. Christmas is home to the world's largest alligator-shaped building, measuring at just over 200 feet (61 m); to Fort Christmas Historical Park, a recreation of the Second Seminole War Fort Christmas; and to Fort Christmas Folk School, a nonprofit school dedicated to teaching folk arts. Every year, Christmas sends a large amount of mail from its post office from people who mail letters from the town so they can have the "Christmas" postmark on their holiday mailings.

Christmas is the birthplace of the American sculptor James Hughlette "Tex" Wheeler, who is buried in the Fort Christmas Cemetery.

Christmas is home to many Orlando digital TV stations' transmission towers.

== History ==
On December 25, 1837, a force of 2,000 U.S. Army soldiers and Alabama Volunteers arrived in the area to construct a fort, which they named Fort Christmas. The fort was one of over 200 forts built during the Second Seminole War. In 1892, a Post Office opened at Christmas.

== Geography ==
According to the United States Census Bureau, the Christmas CDP (Census Designated Place) has a total area of 3.4 square miles (8.9 km^{2}), all land.

== Popular culture ==
Christmas is one of the many settings in John Green's 2008 novel Paper Towns. In the book, three Orlando high school students embark on a journey to find their friend, who has recently gone missing. An old abandoned mini-mall in Christmas is one of the places where they search for her and find clues vital to her case.

== Demographics ==
Historical population
Census	Pop.	Note	%±
2000	1,162		—
2010	1,146		−1.4%
2020	2,439		112.8%
U.S. Decennial Census

=== 2020 census ===
As of the 2020 census, Christmas had a population of 2,439. The median age was 45.8 years. 19.6% of residents were under the age of 18 and 18.4% of residents were 65 years of age or older. For every 100 females there were 110.3 males, and for every 100 females age 18 and over there were 105.9 males age 18 and over.

0.0% of residents lived in urban areas, while 100.0% lived in rural areas.

There were 928 households in Christmas, of which 28.9% had children under the age of 18 living in them. Of all households, 52.2% were married-couple households, 20.6% were households with a male householder and no spouse or partner present, and 17.8% were households with a female householder and no spouse or partner present. About 23.1% of all households were made up of individuals and 9.1% had someone living alone who was 65 years of age or older.

There were 1,080 housing units, of which 14.1% were vacant. The homeowner vacancy rate was 1.4% and the rental vacancy rate was 4.7%.

Racial composition as of the 2020 census
Race	Number	Percent
White	2,019	82.8%
Black or African American	36	1.5%
American Indian and Alaska Native	17	0.7%
Asian	18	0.7%
Native Hawaiian and Other Pacific Islander	0	0.0%
Some other race	124	5.1%
Two or more races	225	9.2%
Hispanic or Latino (of any race)	350	14.4%

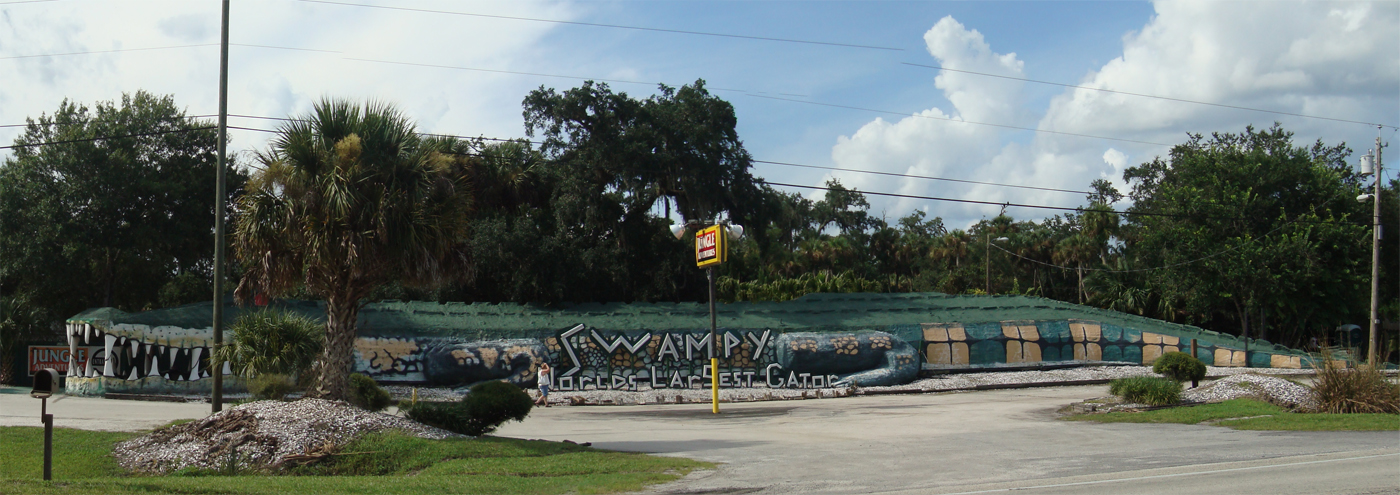
"Swampy", the World's Largest Gator, at Jungle Adventures Nature Animal Park

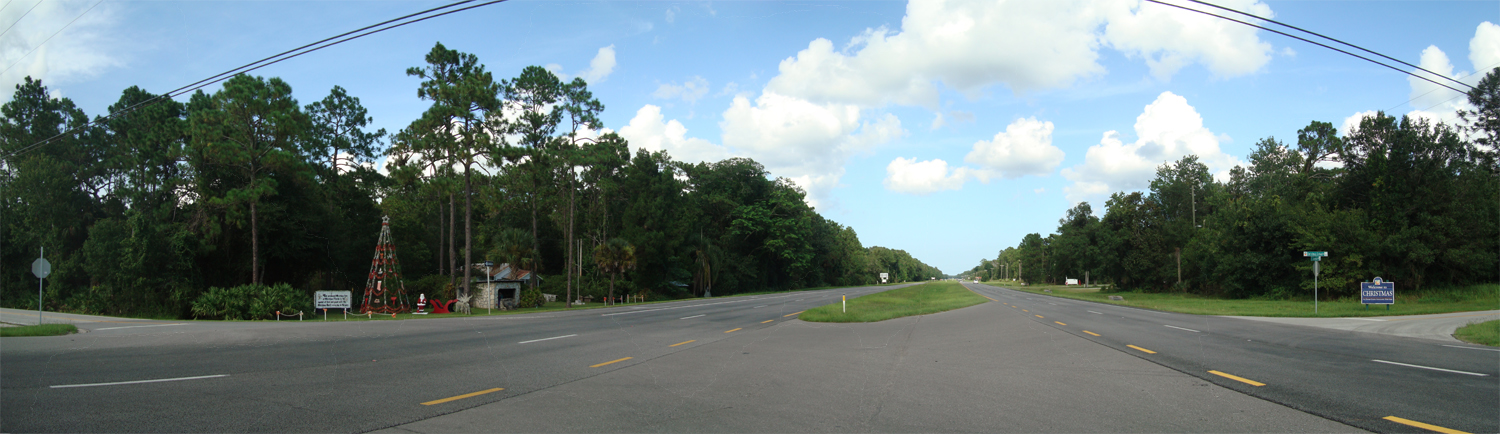
Panorama of Christmas showing Christmas Tree and Sign

=== 2010 census ===
As of the 2010 census, there were 1,146 people (down from 1,162 in the 2000 Census), 422 households (up from 420 in the 2000 Census), and 304 families (the same as in the 2000 Census) residing in the Christmas CDP (Census Designated Place).

As of 2010 there were 422 households, of which 34.8% had children under the age of 18 (up from 30.5% in the 2000 census) living with them, 50.5% were married couples living together (up from 49.5% in 2000), 12.1% had a female householder with no male present (down from 14.0% in the 2000 Census), 9.5% had a male householder with no female present (data from the 2000 Census is not available) and 28% were non-families (up from 27.6% in 2000). 25.4% of the households had individuals 65 years of age or older (a dramatic increase from the 8.3% in 2000). The average household size was 2.72 (2.77 in 2000) and the average family size was 2.99 (down from 3.08 in 2000).

In the Christmas Census Designated Place (CDP), as of the 2010 Census, the median age was 41 years old (up from 37 years old in the 2000 Census). In 2010, 46.9% of the residents of the Christmas CDP were women and 53.1% were males.

The median income for a household in the Christmas CDP was not available for the 2010 Census.

=== 2000 census ===
As of the 2000 Census, the population density was 125.7/km^{2} (325.3/mi²). There were 446 housing units at an average density of 48.2/km^{2} (124.9/mi²). The racial makeup of the Christmas CDP was 95.44% White, 0.43% African American, 0.69% Native American, 0.95% Asian, 0.60% from other races, and 1.89% from two or more races. Hispanic or Latino of any race were 2.15% of the population.
