= Binglin Stable =

Coordinates: 34.2797°N 118.9628°W

- Company type: Horse breeding farm & Thoroughbred racing stable
- Industry: Thoroughbred horse racing
- Defunct: 1953
- Headquarters: Moorpark, California; United States
- Key people: Bing Crosby & Lindsay Howard (co-owners); Albert Johnson, trainer

Binglin Stable in Moorpark, Ventura County, California, was a stock farm established during the latter part of the 1930s to race and breed Thoroughbred horses. The stable was owned by entertainer Bing Crosby and close friend, Lindsay Howard. Crosby was a fan of Thoroughbred horse racing who in 1937 became a founding partner and member of the board of directors of the Del Mar Thoroughbred Club, operators of Del Mar Racetrack in Del Mar, California. Lindsay Howard's father, Charles S. Howard, was a millionaire businessman who was also a founding partner and director of the Del Mar Thoroughbred Club and who owned a successful racing stable that included the 1938 U.S. Horse of the Year, Seabiscuit. Upon his retirement from riding, future Hall of Fame jockey Albert Johnson, a childhood friend of Crosby, became the stable's trainer.

Lindsay Howard was a top-ranked polo player, as was his brother Robert. They frequently played in Argentina, the polo capital of the world, and as such the brothers and Crosby decided to establish "Caballeriza Binglin Stock Farm" near Buenos Aires where they purchased a number of locally bred horses and shipped them back to the United States. As well, Binglin Stable raced horses at Hipódromo de Palermo in Palermo, notably the mare Blackie whom they later sent to the US to serve as a broodmare. Blackie would appear on the cover of the September 19, 1942 issue of The Blood-Horse magazine.

Other Argentine horses of note that Binglin Stable brought to the US included Kayak II, who was sold to Charles S. Howard, plus Ligaroti and Don Bingo, the latter a winner of the 1943 Suburban Handicap at Belmont Park in Elmont, New York. On August 12, 1938, the Del Mar Thoroughbred Club hosted a $25,000 winner-take-all match race between Seabiscuit and Ligaroti. In an era when horse racing ranked second in popularity with Americans to Major League Baseball, the match race was much written and talked about and drew a record crowd that helped make the fledgling Del Mar race track a success. It was the first nationwide broadcast of a thoroughbred race by NBC radio. Many racing experts felt that Ligaroti was not in the same class as Seabiscuit, but the two horses battled head to head with Seabiscuit winning by a nose.

The Binglin Stable partnership ended in 1953 as a result of a liquidation of assets by Bing Crosby to raise the funds to pay the federal and state inheritance taxes on his late wife's estate.
