= Charles S. Howard =

American businessman

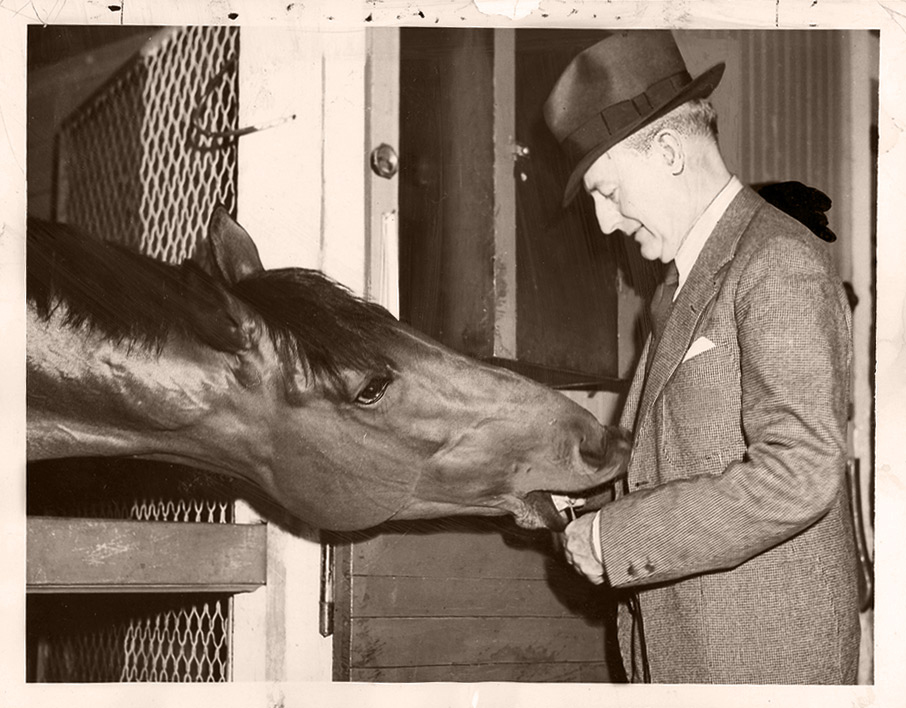
- Born: Charles Stewart Howard; February 28, 1877; Marietta, Georgia, United States
- Died: June 6, 1950 (aged 73); San Francisco, California, United States
- Resting place: Cypress Lawn Memorial Park, Colma, California
- Occupations: Automobile dealer Thoroughbred racehorse owner
- Spouses: Fannie May Smith (m. 1901; div. 1932) Marcela Zabala (m. 1932)
- Children: 4, including Lindsay C. Howard

Charles Stewart Howard (February 28, 1877 – June 6, 1950) was an American businessman. He made his fortune as an automobile dealer and became a prominent thoroughbred racehorse owner.

== Biography ==
Howard was dubbed one of the most successful Buick salesmen of all time. He bought the soon-to-be-famous horse Seabiscuit. According to Laura Hillenbrand's biography of Seabiscuit, Howard's early car dealership in San Francisco was given a boost by the hand of fate; on the day of the 1906 San Francisco earthquake, he was one of the few individuals who had operational vehicles in the city, and was thus able to help the rescue effort significantly.

In 1921, long before he bought Seabiscuit, Charles Howard purchased the 16,000-acre (6,475 ha) Ridgewood Ranch at Willits in Mendocino County. His 15-year-old son, Frankie, died there in 1926 after a truck accident on the property (the elder Howard established the Frank R. Howard Memorial Hospital as a memorial to his son). Used as a secondary residence, by the 1930s Howard had converted part of the ranch into a thoroughbred horse breeding and training center. Although Seabiscuit was the most famous resident at Ridgewood Ranch, Charles Howard owned many horses in his secondary career as a Thoroughbred owner including Kayak II (also Kajak) and Hall of Fame colt Noor, the first of only two horses to defeat two U.S. Triple Crown champions.

In the early 1930s, Howard was involved in a series of legal disputes with Edmond Herrscher, the divorce attorney who had represented his former wife, Fannie May Howard, in their divorce proceedings. Herrscher had secured Fannie May a divorce settlement of approximately $2.5 million in 1932, and then married her eleven days later. Howard and Fannie May also contested control of the substantial trust fund established for their teenage son, Robert, with the court ruling in Fannie May's favor.

During his marriage to Fannie May, Howard began a relationship with Marcela Zabala who was 27 years his junior, and they married in 1932. Zabala was the sister of Anita Zabala Howard, the wife of his son, Lindsay C. Howard.

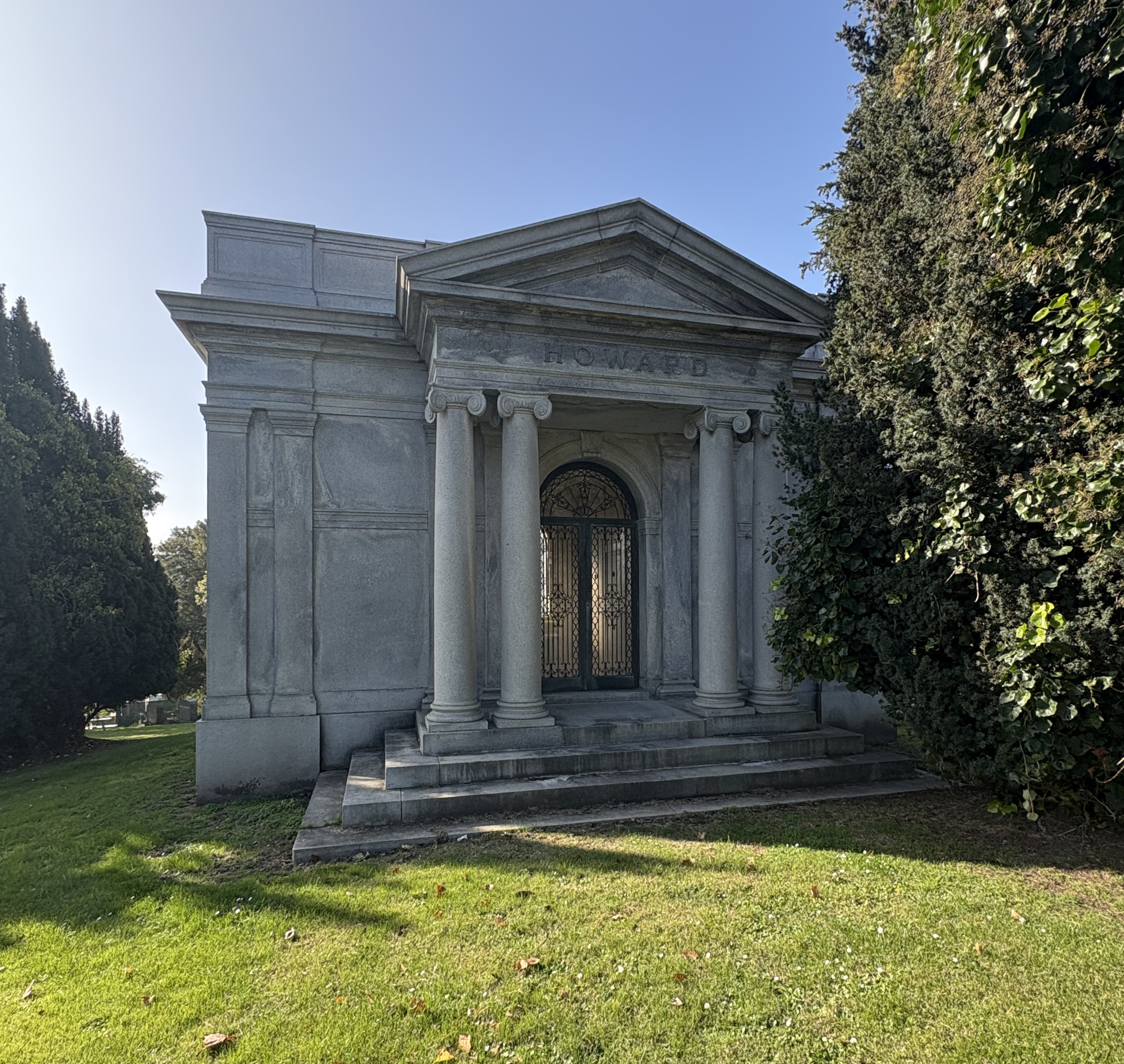
Howard mausoleum at Cypress Lawn Memorial Park

Charles Howard died of a heart attack in 1950 and was buried in the Cypress Lawn Memorial Park in Colma, California. Ridgewood Ranch was sold by his heirs, with some of the horses sent to his son Lindsay's Binglin Stable in Moorpark, California.

== See also ==
- Seabiscuit – a film starring Jeff Bridges as Charles S Howard
