= Ridgewood Ranch =

Ranch in California, United States

Coordinates: 39°19′10.00″N 123°18′30.00″W

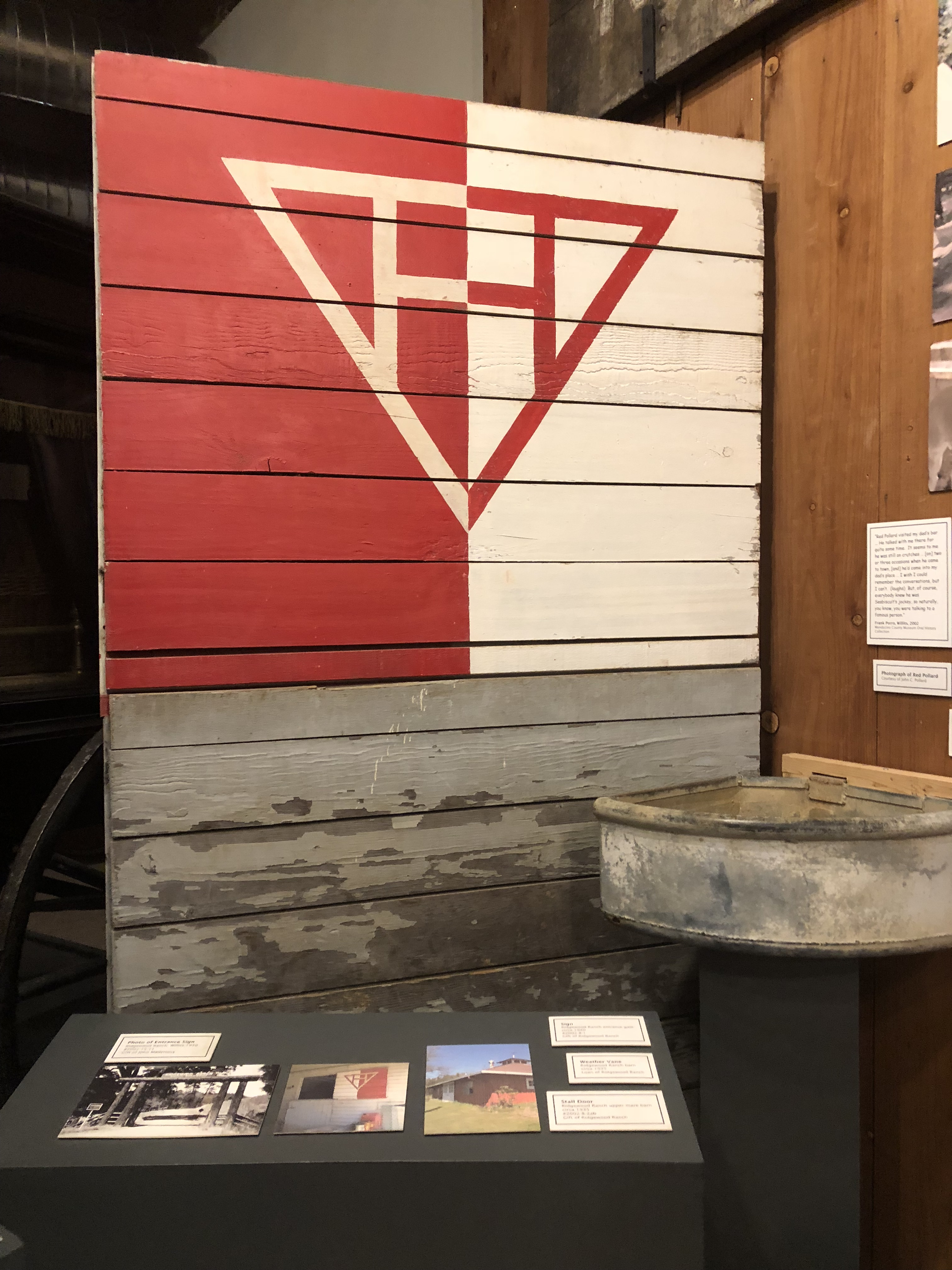
Ridgewood Ranch sign on display at the Mendocino County Museum

Ridgewood Ranch is a large ranch situated 7 miles (11 km) south of Willits, California, in rural Mendocino County. It may be known best as the final resting place of the racehorse Seabiscuit.

== History ==
Situated in a low mountain valley below Ridgewood Summit, the 5,000 acres (20 km^{2}) that would become Ridgewood Ranch were originally inhabited by the indigenous Pomo peoples. The property was purchased by automobile magnate Charles S. Howard in 1919, and he quickly transformed it into a fully working ranch and thoroughbred facility, complete with the Howards' large Craftsman style home, and horse stud barn. In May 1926, Charles's son Frank was killed in a vehicle accident on the ranch. That tragedy led the Howards to fund the construction of Frank R. Howard Memorial Hospital, opened in 1928 in nearby Willits. At the end of Seabiscuit's successful racing career in 1940, he was put out to stud and live his retirement at the ranch, finally being laid to rest on the property in 1947.

Today the property is owned by the Golden Rule Church Association, which has taken steps to preserve its historic and environmental value. The Howard family's house still stands, together with Seabiscuit's stud barn and the remains of an old Pomo village. The ranch is also home to nearly 20 acres (81,000 m^{2}) of first and second growth redwood, large fir forests and oak woodlands. It contains some rare vernal pools and provides habitat to a number of native species, including the golden eagle and California mountain lion.

Recently the conservancy erected a statue of Seabiscuit to help preserve the heritage of the ranch, and guided tours of the ranch are offered to the public.
