= Seabiscuit =

American champion thoroughbred racehorse (1933–1947)

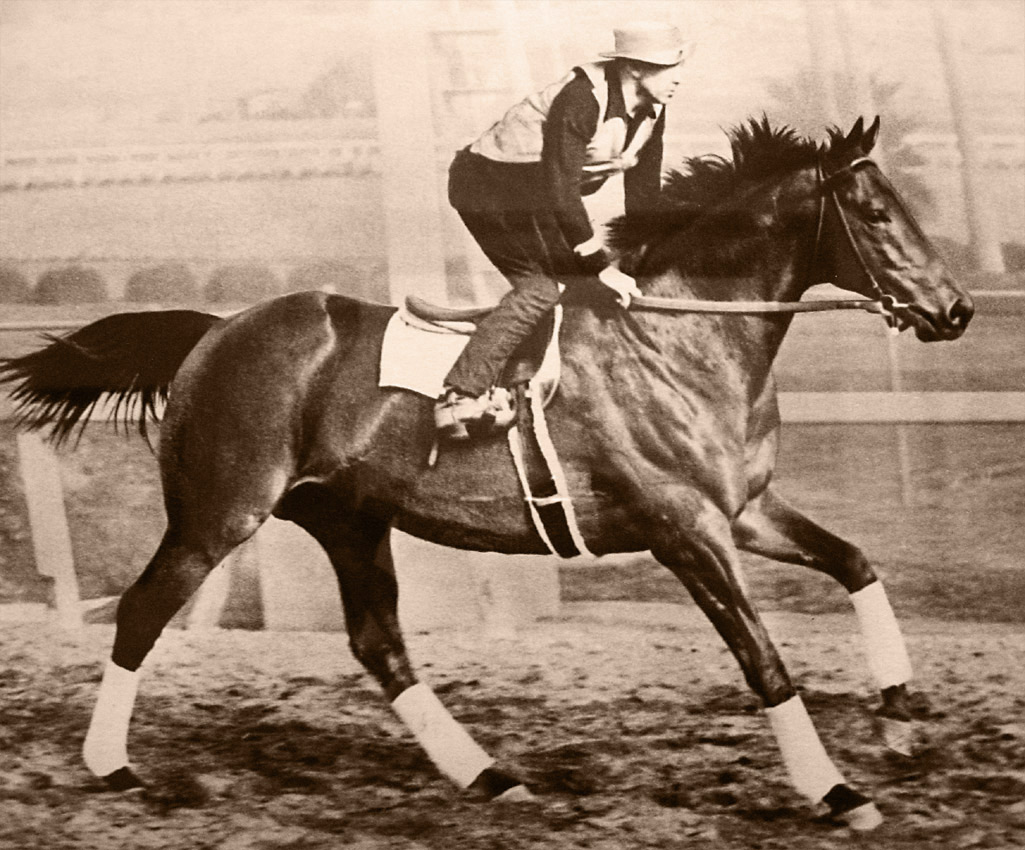
- George Woolf on Seabiscuit
- Sire: Hard Tack
- Grandsire: Man o' War
- Dam: Swing On
- Damsire: Whisk Broom II
- Sex: Stallion
- Foaled: 23 May 1933
- Died: 17 May 1947 (aged 13)
- Country: United States
- Colour: Bay
- Breeder: Gladys Mills Phipps
- Owner: Charles Howard
- Trainer: 1) "Sunny Jim" Fitzsimmons; 2) Tom Smith
- Record: 89: 33–15–1
- Earnings: $437,730

Major wins
- Scarsdale Handicap (1936); Massachusetts Handicap (1937); Brooklyn Handicap (1937); Butler Memorial Handicap (1937); Riggs Handicap (1937); San Juan Capistrano Handicap (1937); Bay Meadows Handicap (1937, 1938); Agua Caliente Handicap (1938); Havre de Grace Handicap (1938); Match race vs Ligaroti (1938); Pimlico Special vs War Admiral (1938); Hollywood Gold Cup (1938); San Antonio Handicap (1940); Santa Anita Handicap (1940)

Awards
- U.S. Champion Handicap Male (1937 & 1938); U.S. Horse of the Year (1938)

Honors
- United States Racing Hall of Fame (1958) #25 – Top 100 U.S. Racehorses of the 20th Century; Life-size statues at Santa Anita Park and Saratoga Springs; Grade II Seabiscuit Handicap at Del Mar Racetrack (2014– )
- Last updated on 21 November 2021

Seabiscuit (May 23, 1933 – May 17, 1947) was a champion thoroughbred racehorse in the United States who became the top money-winning racehorse up to the 1940s. He beat the 1937 Triple Crown winner, War Admiral, by four lengths in a two-horse special at Pimlico and was voted American Horse of the Year for 1938.

A small horse, at 15.2 hands high, Seabiscuit had an inauspicious start to his racing career, winning only a quarter of his first 40 races, but became an unlikely champion and a symbol of hope to many Americans during the Great Depression.

Seabiscuit has been the subject of numerous books and films, including Seabiscuit: the Lost Documentary (1939); the Shirley Temple film The Story of Seabiscuit (1949); a book, Seabiscuit: An American Legend (1999) by Laura Hillenbrand; and a film adaptation of Hillenbrand's book, Seabiscuit (2003), that was nominated for the Academy Award for Best Picture. There is also a street in Indian Trail, North Carolina named after him.

== Background and early days ==
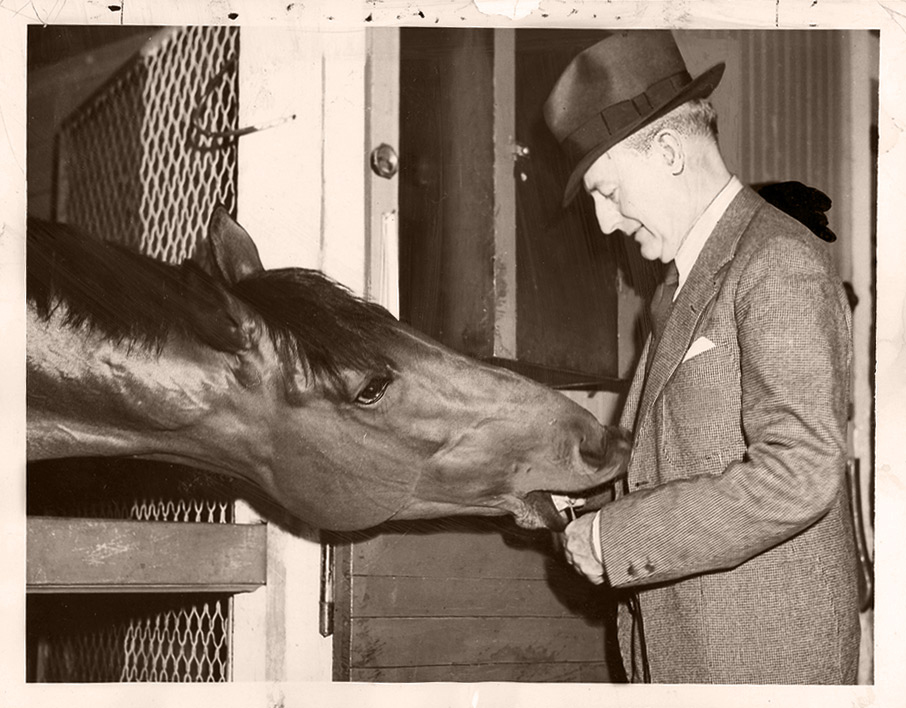
Seabiscuit with owner Charles Howard

Seabiscuit was foaled on May 23, 1933, at Claiborne Farm in Paris, Kentucky. He was a result of owner Gladys Phipps' breeding of the infamous Hard Tack and one of her mares Swing On. Seabiscuit was named for his father; "sea biscuit" is another name for hardtack, a type of cracker eaten by sailors.

The bay colt grew up at Claiborne Farm where he was trained. He was undersized, knobby-kneed, and given to sleeping and eating for long periods.

Initially, Seabiscuit was owned by the powerful Wheatley Stable and trained by "Sunny Jim" Fitzsimmons, who had taken Gallant Fox to the United States Triple Crown of Thoroughbred Racing. Fitzsimmons saw some potential in Seabiscuit but felt the horse was too lazy. Fitzsimmons devoted most of his time to training Omaha, who won the 1935 Triple Crown.

Seabiscuit was relegated to a heavy schedule of smaller races. He failed to win any of his first 17 races, usually finishing back in the field. After that, Fitzsimmons did not spend much time on him, and the horse was sometimes the butt of stable jokes. However, Seabiscuit began to gain attention after winning two races at Narragansett Park and setting a new track record in the second—Claiming Stakes race.

As a two-year-old, Seabiscuit raced 35 times (a heavy racing schedule), coming in first five times and finishing second seven times. These included three claiming races, in which he could have been purchased for $2,500, but he had no takers.

While Seabiscuit had not lived up to his racing potential, he was not the poor performer Fitzsimmons had taken him for. His last two wins as a two-year-old came in minor stakes races. The next season started with a similar pattern. The colt ran 12 times in less than four months, winning four times. One of those races was a cheap allowance race on the "sweltering afternoon of June 29," 1936, at Suffolk Downs. That was where trainer Tom Smith first laid eyes on Seabiscuit. His owners sold the horse to automobile entrepreneur Charles S. Howard for $8,000 at Saratoga, in August.

== 1936/1937: The beginning of success ==
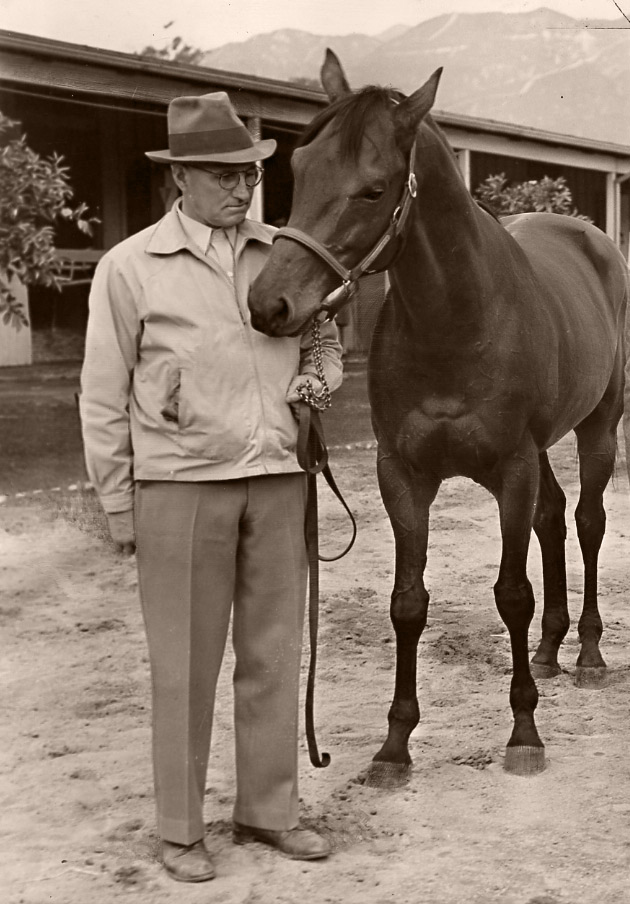
Seabiscuit with trainer Tom Smith

Howard assigned Seabiscuit to a new trainer, Tom Smith, who, with his unorthodox training methods, gradually brought Seabiscuit out of his lethargy. Smith paired the horse with Canadian jockey Red Pollard (1909–1981), who had experience racing in the West and in Mexico. On August 22, 1936, they raced Seabiscuit for the first time. Improvements came quickly, and in their remaining eight races in the East, Seabiscuit and Pollard won several times, including the Detroit Governor's Handicap (worth $5,600) and the Scarsdale Handicap ($7,300) at Empire City Race Track in Yonkers, New York.

In early November 1936, Howard and Smith shipped the horse to California by rail. His last two races of the year were at Bay Meadows racetrack in San Mateo, California. The first was the $2,700 Bay Bridge Handicap, run over one-mile (1.6 km). Despite starting badly and carrying the top weight of 116 pounds (53 kg), Seabiscuit won by five lengths. At the World's Fair Handicap (Bay Meadows' most prestigious stakes race), Seabiscuit led throughout.

In 1937, the Santa Anita Handicap, California's most prestigious race, was worth over $125,000 ($3 million in 2010) to the winner; it was known colloquially as "The Hundred Grander." In his first warm-up race at Santa Anita Park, Seabiscuit won easily. In his second race of 1937, the San Antonio Handicap, he suffered a setback after he was bumped at the start and then pushed wide; Seabiscuit came in fifth, losing to Rosemont.

The two met again in the Santa Anita Handicap a week later, where Rosemont won by a nose. The defeat was devastating to Smith and Howard and was widely attributed in the press to a jockey error. Pollard, who had not seen Rosemont over his shoulder until too late, was blind in one eye due to an accident during a training ride, a fact he had hidden throughout his career. A week after this defeat Seabiscuit won the San Juan Capistrano Handicap by seven lengths in track record time of 1:48 4/5 for the 1 1/8 mile event.

Seabiscuit was rapidly becoming a favorite among California racing fans, and his fame spread as he won his next three races. With his successes, Howard decided to ship the horse east for its more prestigious racing circuit.

Seabiscuit's run of victories continued. Between June 26 and August 7, he ran five times, each time in a stakes race, and each time he won under steadily increasing handicap weights (imposts) of up to 130 pounds (59 kg). For the third time, Seabiscuit faced off against Rosemont again, this time beating him by seven lengths. On September 11, Smith accepted an impost of 132 pounds (60 kg) for the Narragansett Special at Narragansett Park. On race day, the ground was slow and heavy, and unsuited to "the Biscuit", carrying the heaviest burden of his career. Smith wanted to scratch, but Howard overruled him. Never in the running, Seabiscuit finished third. His winning streak was snapped, but the season was not over; Seabiscuit won his next three races (one a dead heat) before finishing the year with a second-place at Pimlico.

In 1937, Seabiscuit won 11 of his 15 races and was the year's leading money winner in the United States. However, War Admiral, having won the Triple Crown that season, was voted the most prestigious honor, the American Horse of the Year Award.

== Early five-year-old season ==
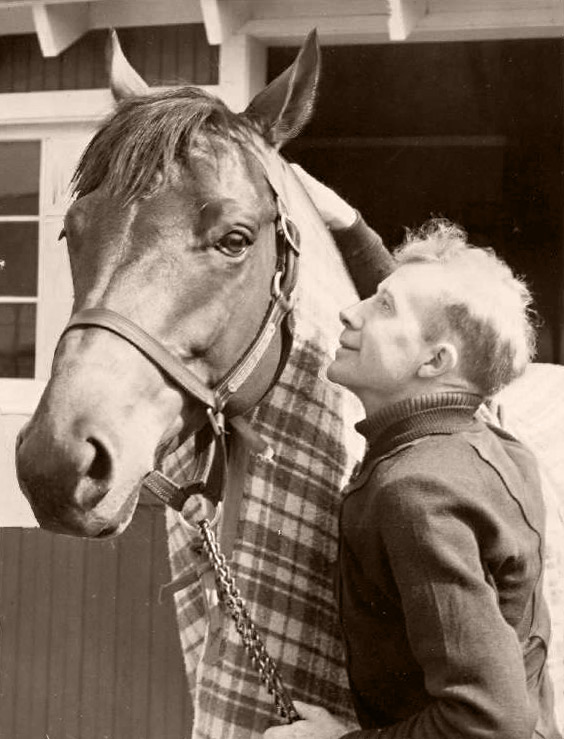
Seabiscuit with Red Pollard

In 1938, as a five-year-old, Seabiscuit's success continued. On February 19, Pollard suffered a terrible fall while racing on Fair Knightess, another of Howard's horses. With half of Pollard's chest caved in by the weight of the fallen horse, Howard had to find a new jockey. After trying three, he settled on George Woolf, an already successful rider and old friend of Pollard's.

Woolf's first race aboard Seabiscuit was the Santa Anita Handicap, "The Hundred Grander" the horse had narrowly lost the previous year. Seabiscuit was drawn on the outside, and at the start was impeded by another horse, Count Atlas, angling out. The two were locked together for the first straight, and by the time Woolf disentangled his horse, they were six lengths off the pace. Seabiscuit worked his way to the lead but lost in a photo finish to the fast-closing Santa Anita Derby winner, Stagehand (owned by Maxwell Howard, not related to Charles), who had been assigned 30 pounds (14 kg) less than Seabiscuit.

Throughout 1937 and 1938, the media speculated about a match race between Seabiscuit and the seemingly invincible War Admiral (sired by Man o' War, Seabiscuit's grandsire). The two horses were scheduled to meet in three stakes races, but one or the other was scratched, usually due to Seabiscuit's dislike of heavy ground. After extensive negotiation, the owners organized a match race for May 1938 at Belmont, but Seabiscuit was scratched.

By June, Pollard had recovered, and on June 23, he agreed to work a young colt named Modern Youth. Spooked by something on the track, the horse broke rapidly through the stables and threw Pollard, shattering his leg and seemingly ending his career.

Howard arranged a match race for Seabiscuit against Ligaroti, a highly regarded horse owned by the Hollywood entertainer Bing Crosby and Howard's son, Lindsay, through Binglin Stable, in an event organized to promote Crosby's resort and Del Mar Racetrack in Del Mar, California. With Woolf aboard, Seabiscuit won that race, despite persistent fouling from Ligaroti's jockey. After three more outings and with only one win, he was scheduled to go head-to-head with War Admiral in the Pimlico Special in November, in Baltimore, Maryland.

Sent to race on the East Coast, on October 16, 1938, Seabiscuit ran second by two lengths in the Laurel Stakes to the filly Jacola, who set a new Laurel Park Racecourse record of 1:37.00 for one mile.

"George Woolf always said he never had more fun on a racehorse than he did that day in 1938 at Pimlico, when Tom Smith, the horse's trainer, lifted Woolf aboard Seabiscuit for the big match race against War Admiral."

— William Nack, Sports Illustrated, November 29, 1999

On November 1, 1938, Seabiscuit met War Admiral and jockey Charles Kurtsinger in what was dubbed the "Match of the Century." The event was run over 1 3/16 miles (1.9 km) at Pimlico Race Course. From the grandstands to the infield, the track was jammed with fans. Trains were run from all over the country to bring fans to the race, and the estimated 40,000 at the track were joined by 40 million listening on the radio. War Admiral was the favorite (1–4 with most bookmakers) and a nearly unanimous selection of the writers and tipsters, excluding a California contingent.

Head-to-head races favor fast starters, and War Admiral's speed from the gate was well known. Seabiscuit, on the other hand, was a pace stalker, skilled at holding with the pack before pulling ahead with late acceleration. From the scheduled walk-up start, few gave him a chance to lead War Admiral into the first turn. Smith knew these things and trained Seabiscuit to run against this type, using a starting bell and a whip to give the horse a Pavlovian burst of speed from the start.

When the bell rang, Seabiscuit broke in front, led by over a length after 20 seconds, and soon crossed over to the rail position. Halfway down the backstretch, War Admiral started to cut into the lead, gradually pulling level with Seabiscuit, then slightly ahead. Following advice he had received from Pollard, Woolf had eased up on Seabiscuit, allowing his horse to see his rival, then asked for more effort. Two hundred yards from the wire, Seabiscuit pulled away again and continued to extend his lead over the closing stretch, finally winning by four lengths despite War Admiral running his best time for the distance.

As a result of his races that year, Seabiscuit was named American Horse of the Year for 1938, beating War Admiral by 698 points to 489 in a poll conducted by the Turf and Sport Digest magazine. Seabiscuit was the number one newsmaker of 1938. The only major prize that eluded him was the Santa Anita Handicap.

== Injury and return ==
Seabiscuit was injured during a race. Woolf, who was riding him, said that he felt the horse stumble. The injury was not life-threatening, although many predicted Seabiscuit would never race again. The diagnosis was a ruptured suspensory ligament in the front left leg. With Seabiscuit out of action, Smith and Howard concentrated on their horse Kayak II, an Argentine stallion. In the spring of 1939, Seabiscuit covered seven of Howard's mares, all of which had healthy foals in spring of 1940. One, Fair Knightess's colt, died as a yearling.

Seabiscuit and a still-convalescing Pollard recovered together at Howard's ranch, with the help of Pollard's new wife Agnes, who had nursed him through his initial recovery. Slowly, both horse and rider learned to walk again (Pollard joked that they "had four good legs between" them). Poverty and his injury had brought Pollard to the edge of alcoholism. A local doctor broke and reset Pollard's leg to aid his recovery, and slowly Pollard regained the confidence to sit on a horse. Wearing a brace to stiffen his atrophied leg, he began to ride Seabiscuit again, first at a walk and later at a trot and canter. Howard was delighted at their improvement, as he longed for Seabiscuit to race again, but was extremely worried about Pollard, as his leg was still fragile.

Over the fall and winter of 1939, Seabiscuit's fitness seemed to improve by the day. By the end of the year, Smith was ready to return the horse to race training, with a collection of stable jockeys in the saddle. By the time of his comeback race, Pollard had cajoled Howard into allowing him the ride. After the horse was scratched due to soft going, the pair finally lined up at the start of the La Jolla Handicap at Santa Anita, on February 9, 1940. Seabiscuit was third, beaten by two lengths. By their third comeback race, Seabiscuit was back to his winning ways, running away from the field in the San Antonio Handicap to beat his erstwhile training partner, Kayak II, by two and a half lengths. Under 124 pounds (56 kg), Seabiscuit equalled the track record for a mile and 1/16.

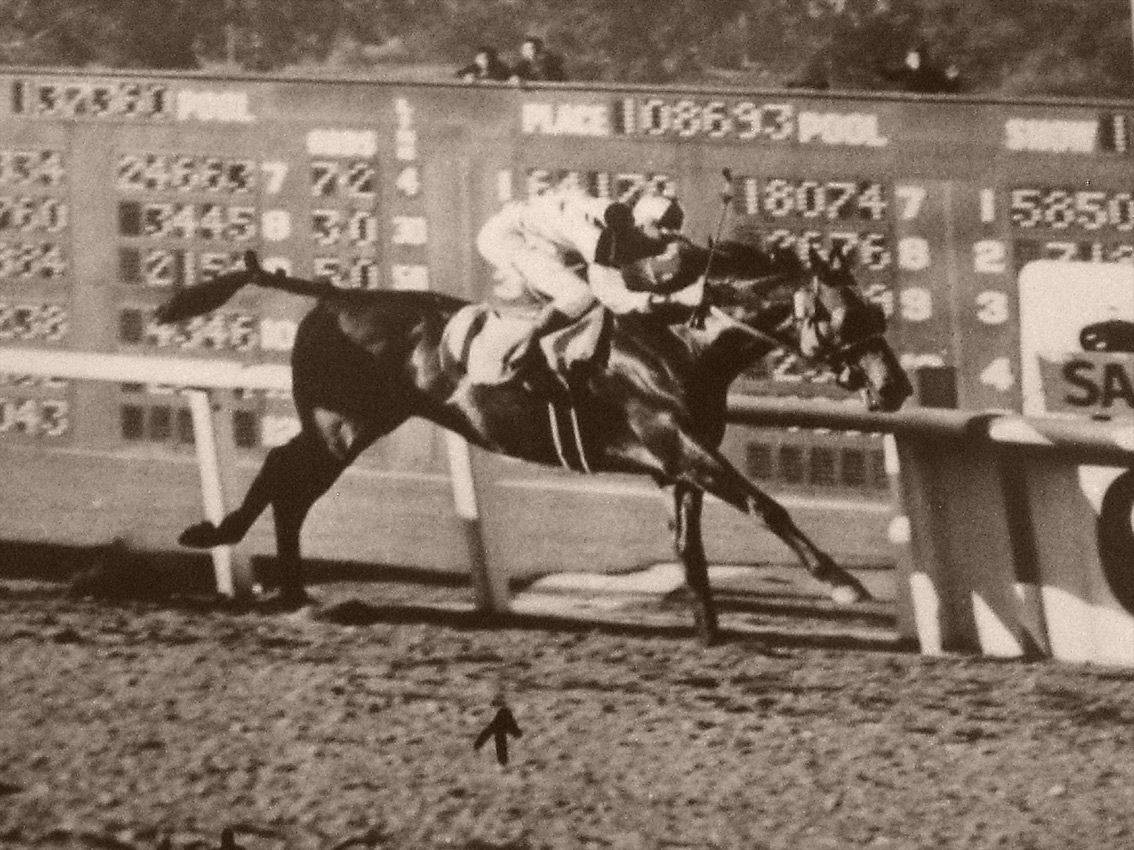
Seabiscuit winning the Santa Anita Handicap in 1940

One race was left in the season. A week after the San Antonio, Seabiscuit and Kayak II both took the gate for the Santa Anita Handicap and its $121,000 prize. Seventy-eight thousand paying spectators crammed the racetrack, most backing Seabiscuit. Pollard found his horse blocked almost from the start. Picking his way through the field, Seabiscuit briefly led. As they thundered down the back straight, Seabiscuit became trapped in third place, behind leader Whichcee and Wedding Call on the outside.

Trusting in his horse's acceleration, Pollard steered between the leaders and burst into the lead, taking the firm ground just off the rail. As Seabiscuit showed his old surge, Wedding Call and Whichcee faltered, and Pollard drove his horse on, taking "The Hundred Grander" by a length and a half from the fast-closing Kayak II under jockey Leon Haas. Pandemonium engulfed the course. Neither horse and rider, nor trainer and owner, could get through the crowd of well-wishers to the winner's enclosure for some time.

== Retirement, later life, and offspring ==
On April 10, 1940, Seabiscuit's retirement from racing was officially announced. When he was retired to the Ridgewood Ranch near Willits, California, he was horse racing's all-time leading money winner. Put out to stud, Seabiscuit sired 108 foals, including two moderately successful racehorses: Sea Sovereign and Sea Swallow. Over 50,000 visitors went to Ridgewood Ranch to see Seabiscuit in those seven years before his death in 1947.

== Death and interment ==
Seabiscuit died of a probable heart attack on May 17, 1947, in Willits, California, six months before his grandsire Man o' War. He is buried at Ridgewood Ranch in Mendocino County, California.

== Legacy and honors ==
=== Awards and honorable distinctions ===
- 1938 American Horse of the Year
- In 1958, Seabiscuit was voted into the National Museum of Racing and Hall of Fame.
- In the Blood-Horse magazine List of the Top 100 U.S. Racehorses of the 20th Century (1999), Seabiscuit was ranked 25th. War Admiral was 13th, and Seabiscuit's grandsire and War Admiral's sire, Man o' War, placed 1st.

=== Portrayals in film and television ===
==== Documentaries ====
- American Experience: "Seabiscuit" (April 21, 2003)) is a documentary episode that aired as Season 15, Episode 11 of the PBS American Experience series.
- ESPN SportsCentury: "Seabiscuit" (November 17, 2003), Seabiscuit was featured on ESPN's SportsCentury Greatest Athletes series.
- The True Story of Seabiscuit (July 27, 2003) is a 45-minute made-for-TV documentary directed by Craig Haffner, written by Martin Gillam, and containing interviews and footage with William H. Macy, Seabiscuit, and Tobey Maguire, that aired on the USA Network.
- Seabiscuit: the Lost Documentary (1939) by Seabiscuit's owner Charles Howard. The film was directed by Manny Nathan, and written by Nathan and Hazel Merry Hawkins. It stars Martin Mason, Doc Bond, Charles Howard as himself and his wife, Marcella. It was colorized and released in 2003 by Legend Films to coincide with interest around the movie.
- Seabiscuit: America's Legendary Racehorse (2003) directed and produced by Nick Krantz.

==== Fiction films ====
- Stablemates (1938), starring Wallace Beery and Mickey Rooney. Film producer Harry Rapf arranged a deal whereby he could film the $50,000 Hollywood Gold Cup, and actual footage of Seabiscuit running in the race was used. The field is headed by Seabiscuit for the "straight" race in the film.
- Porky and Teabiscuit (1939) is Warner Bros.' Porky Pig cartoon take on Seabiscuit's underdog story.
- The Story of Seabiscuit (1949), starring Shirley Temple in her penultimate film, is a fictionalized account featuring Sea Sovereign in the title role. An otherwise undistinguished film, it did include actual footage of the 1938 match race against War Admiral and the 1940 Santa Anita Handicap.
- Seabiscuit (2003), Universal Studios' adaptation of Laura Hillenbrand's bestselling 2001 book, was nominated for seven Academy Awards, including Best Picture
- The Making of Seabiscuit (December 16, 2003) is a documentary short directed by Laurent Bouzereau and starring Tobey Maguire, Jeff Bridges, Chris Cooper, and William Goldenberg, produced by DreamWorks SKG, Herzog Productions, Spyglass Entertainment, and Universal Studios, and distributed by Universal Studios Home Video.

=== Non-fiction books ===
- Track writer B.K. Beckwith wrote Seabiscuit: The Saga of a Great Champion (1940), with a foreword by Grantland Rice.
- Ralph Moody wrote Come On, Seabiscuit! (1963), illustrated by Robert Riger.
- Laura Hillenbrand's book Seabiscuit: An American Legend (2001) became a bestseller, and in 2003 it was adapted for film.

=== Postage stamp ===
In 2009, after an eight-year-long grassroots effort by Maggie Van Ostrand and Chuck Lustick, Seabiscuit was honored by the United States Postal Service with a stamp bearing his likeness. Thousands of signatures were obtained from all over the nation, and the final approval was given by Citizens Stamp Committee member Joan Mondale, wife of former Vice President Walter Mondale.

=== Statues ===
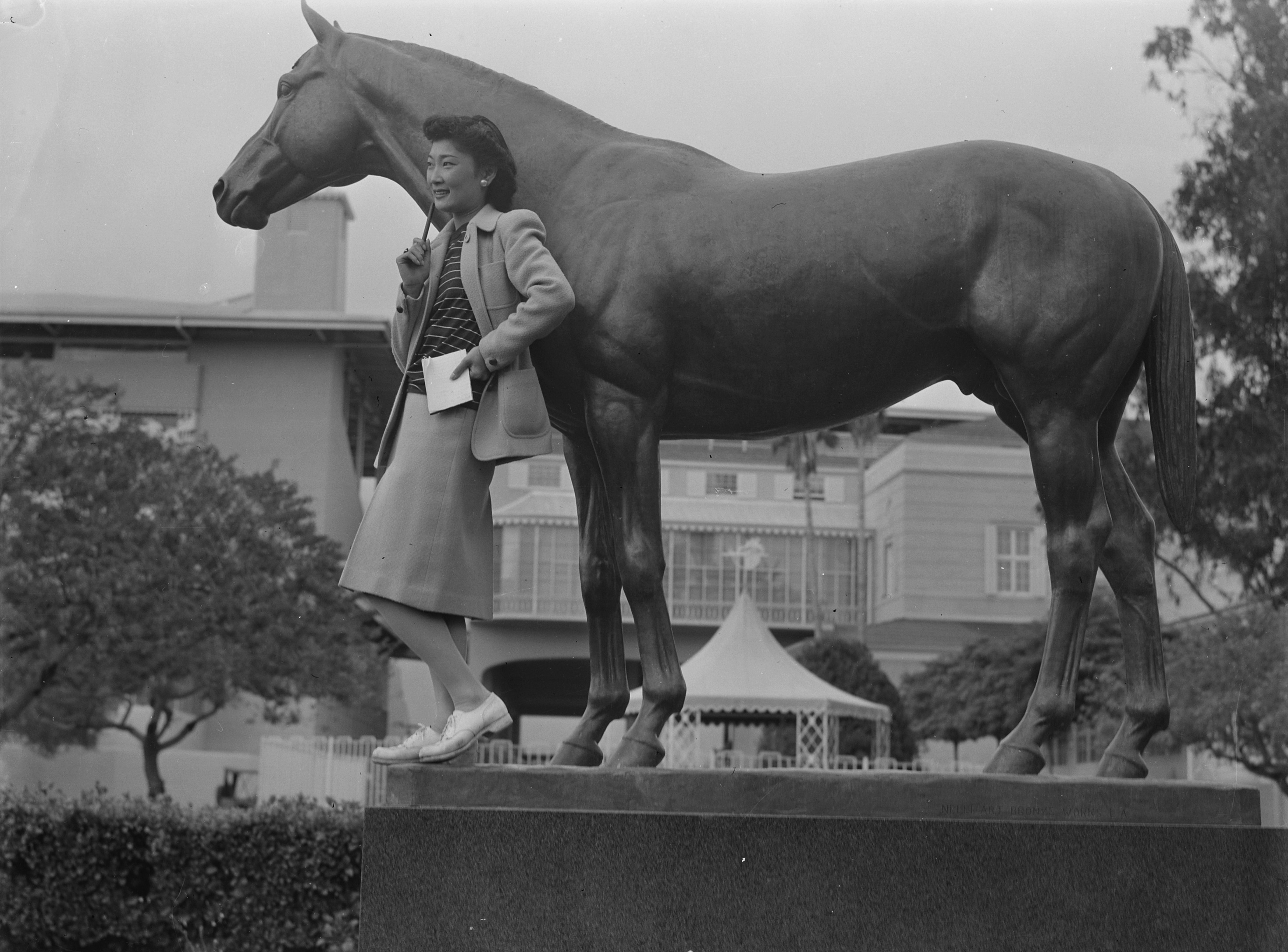
1941 Seabiscuit statue by American sculptor Jame Hughlette ("Tex") Wheeler at Santa Anita Park racetrack. Lily Okuru, a Japanese American woman who lived on the track site during its time as a War Relocation Camp, poses with the statue in 1942.

- A statue of Seabiscuit (not life-sized) sits outside the main entrance of The Shops at Tanforan, a shopping mall built upon the former site of the Tanforan Racetrack. Seabiscuit was stabled there briefly in 1939, while preparing for his comeback.
- In the 1940s, businessman and racehorse owner W. Arnold Hanger donated a statuette of Seabiscuit to the Keeneland library.
- In 1941, American sculptor Jame Hughlette "Tex" Wheeler cast two life-sized bronze statues of Seabiscuit hand-tooled by Frank Buchler, the German immigrant owner of Washington Ornamental Iron Company Los Angeles: one stands in "Seabiscuit Court", the walking ring at Santa Anita Park racetrack in Arcadia, CA; the other is outside the National Museum of Racing in Saratoga Springs, NY.
- On June 23, 2007, a statue of Seabiscuit was unveiled at Ridgewood Ranch, Seabiscuit's final resting place.
- On July 17, 2010, a life-size statue of George Woolf and Seabiscuit was unveiled at the Remington Carriage Museum in Woolf's hometown of Cardston, Alberta. This coincided with the 100th anniversary of Woolf's birth, though not the actual date.
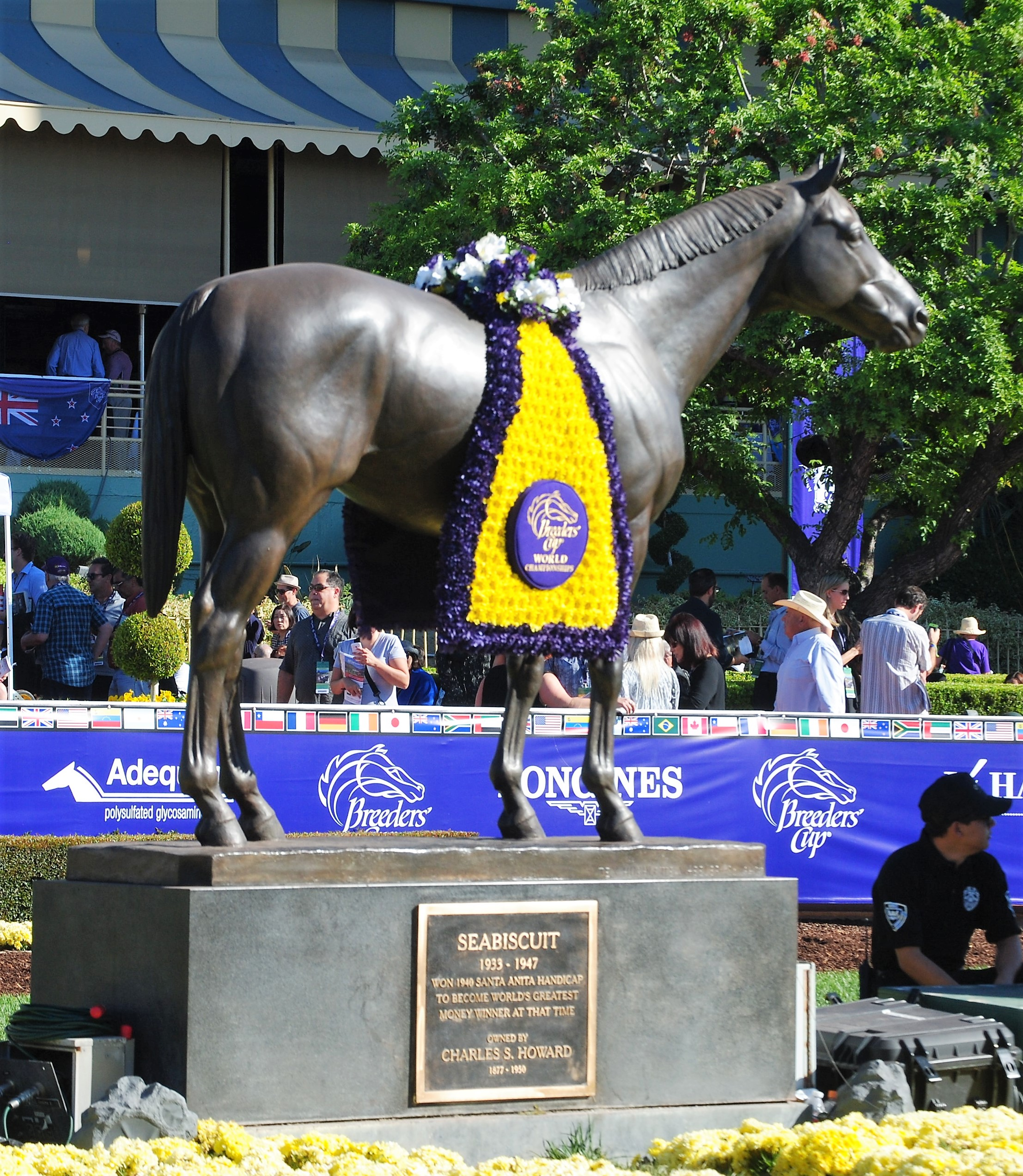
"Seabiscuit" statue at Santa Anita in 2016, draped in a Breeders' Cup winner's blanket.

== Pedigree ==
Pedigree of Seabiscuit
Sire Hard Tack b. 1926	Man o' War ch. 1917	Fair Play ch. 1905	Hastings
Sire Hard Tack b. 1926	Man o' War ch. 1917	Fair Play ch. 1905	Fairy Gold
Sire Hard Tack b. 1926	Man o' War ch. 1917	Mahubah b. 1910	Rock Sand
Sire Hard Tack b. 1926	Man o' War ch. 1917	Mahubah b. 1910	Merry Token
Sire Hard Tack b. 1926	Tea Biscuit; 1912	Rock Sand br. 1900	Sainfoin
Sire Hard Tack b. 1926	Tea Biscuit; 1912	Rock Sand br. 1900	Roquebrune
Sire Hard Tack b. 1926	Tea Biscuit; 1912	Tea's Over ch. 1893	Hanover
Sire Hard Tack b. 1926	Tea Biscuit; 1912	Tea's Over ch. 1893	Tea Rose
Dam Swing On b. 1926	Whisk Broom II ch. 1907	Broomstick b. 1901	Ben Brush
Dam Swing On b. 1926	Whisk Broom II ch. 1907	Broomstick b. 1901	Elf
Dam Swing On b. 1926	Whisk Broom II ch. 1907	Audience; 1901	Sir Dixon
Dam Swing On b. 1926	Whisk Broom II ch. 1907	Audience; 1901	Sallie McClelland
Dam Swing On b. 1926	Balance b. 1919	Rabelais br. 1900	St. Simon
Dam Swing On b. 1926	Balance b. 1919	Rabelais br. 1900	Satirical
Dam Swing On b. 1926	Balance b. 1919	Balancoire b. 1911	Meddler
Dam Swing On b. 1926	Balance b. 1919	Balancoire b. 1911	Ballantrae

== Notable races won ==
Seabiscuit ran 89 times at 16 different distances over the course of his career.

- Brooklyn Handicap (1937)
- San Antonio Handicap (1940)
- Santa Anita Handicap (1940)

== See also ==
- List of racehorses

== Notes ==
a: The Saturday Evening Post, dated April 27, 1940, reported: "By the following March the horse failed only by inches—because his jockey erred in looking back—to win in his first try at the Santa Anita Handicap, richest of all races."
