= William Frederick Harris =

United States Marine Corps officer

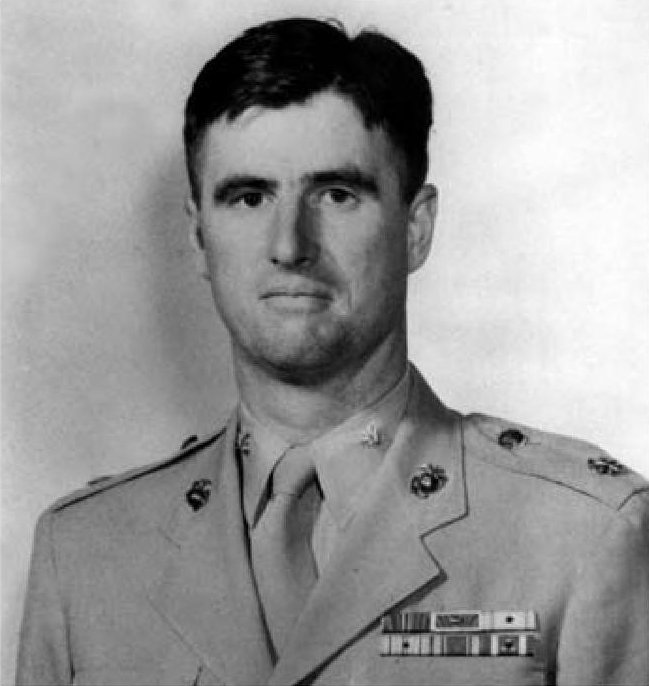
- Lt Col William Harris
- Born: March 6, 1918; Lexington, Kentucky, US
- Died: December 7, 1950 (aged 32); Changjin County, South Hamgyong, North Korea
- Relatives: Field Harris (father)
- Military career
- Allegiance: United States
- Branch: United States Marine Corps
- Service years: 1939–1950
- Rank: Lieutenant colonel
- Nickname: Bill F. Harris
- Service number: 0-5917
- Commands: 3rd Battalion 7th Marines, 1st Marine Division
- Conflicts: World War II; Battle of Corregidor; Korean War; Battle of Chosin Reservoir
- Awards: Navy Cross; Purple Heart

William Frederick Harris (March 6, 1918 – December 7, 1950) was a United States Marine Corps (USMC) lieutenant colonel during the Korean War. The son of USMC General Field Harris, he was a prisoner of war during World War II and a recipient of the Navy Cross for extraordinary heroism during the breakout in the Battle of Chosin Reservoir. He was last seen by American forces on December 7, 1950, was listed missing in action and is presumed to have been killed in action. Harris was featured in the book and film Unbroken.

== Biography ==
William Frederick Harris was born on March 6, 1918, at Good Samaritan Hospital in Lexington, Kentucky, to Field Harris (1895–1967) and Katherine Chinn-Harris (1899–1990).

Harris graduated from the United States Naval Academy, Annapolis, Maryland, in the class of 1939. He was in A Company, 1st Battalion, 4th Marines and was captured by Japanese forces during the Battle of Corregidor in May 1942.

He escaped with Edgar Whitcomb, future governor of Indiana, and on May 22, 1942, swam 8 1/2 hours across Manila Bay to Bataan, where he joined Filipino guerrillas fighting Japan just after the Battle of Bataan. In the summer of 1942, Harris and two others left Whitcomb and attempted to sail to China in a motorboat, but the engine failed and the boat drifted for 29 days with little food or water. The monsoon blew them back to an island in the southern part of the Philippines where they split up and he joined another resistance group. Harris headed towards Australia hoping to rejoin American forces he heard were fighting in Guadalcanal, but he was recaptured in June or September 1943 by Japan on Morotai island, Indonesia, around 1,000 miles (1,600 km) from Bataan.

Harris was taken to Ōfuna POW camp, arriving February 13, 1944 and became acquainted with Louis Zamperini. Harris experienced malnutrition and brutal treatment at the hands of his jailers, notably by Sueharu Kitamura (later convicted of war crimes). Due to malnutrition, by mid-1944 the over 6 feet (180 cm) tall Harris weighed only 120 pounds (54 kg) and had beriberi. In September and November 1944, Harris was beaten severely, to the point of unconsciousness, by Kitamura. According to fellow captive, Pappy Boyington, Harris was knocked down 20 times with a baseball bat for reading a newspaper stolen from the trash. Harris was near death when he arrived at a POW camp near Ōmori in early 1945. Zamperini provided Harris with additional rations and he recovered. William Harris was chosen to represent prisoners of war during the surrender of Japan, aboard USS Missouri on September 2, 1945.

After World War II, Harris remained in the Marines. He married Jeanne Lejeune Glennon in 1946 and had two daughters.

He was recalled to active duty during the Korean War. He was the commanding officer of Third Battalion, Seventh Marines, First Marine Division (Reinforced) in the Korean War. During the breakout in the Battle of Chosin Reservoir, his unit stayed behind as a rear guard to protect retreating forces. Despite heavy losses, Harris rallied his troops and personally went into harm's way during the battle. Harris was last seen by American forces on December 7, 1950, walking and carrying two rifles on his shoulders. He was listed as missing in action, but after the war when former POWs had neither seen nor heard of him, Harris was declared to be dead. He was awarded the Navy Cross in 1951 for his actions at Chosin. Because of his penchant for escape and survival exhibited during World War II, his peers and family were reluctant to accept his death. A superior officer held on to his Navy Cross for a number of years, expecting to be able to give it to Harris personally.

Remains thought to be his were eventually recovered. His family doubted the remains were his, and conclusive testing using DNA had not been attempted as of 2014.

== Awards ==
Navy Cross

For his leadership and heroism on December 7, 1950, Harris was awarded the Navy Cross.

The President of the United States of America takes pride in presenting the Navy Cross (Posthumously) to Lieutenant Colonel William Frederick Harris (MCSN: 0-5917), United States Marine Corps, for extraordinary heroism in connection with military operations against an armed enemy of the United Nations while serving as Commanding Officer of the Third Battalion, Seventh Marines, FIRST Marine Division (Reinforced), in action against enemy aggressor forces in the Republic of Korea the early morning of 7 December 1950. Directing his Battalion in affording flank protection for the regimental vehicle train and the first echelon of the division trains proceeding from Hagaru-ri to Koto-ri, Lieutenant Colonel Harris, despite numerous casualties suffered in the bitterly fought advance, promptly went into action when a vastly outnumbering, deeply entrenched hostile force suddenly attacked at point-blank range from commanding ground during the hours of darkness. With his column disposed on open, frozen terrain and in danger of being cut off from the convoy as the enemy laid down enfilade fire from a strong roadblock, he organized a group of men and personally led them in a bold attack to neutralize the position with heavy losses to the enemy, thereby enabling the convoy to move through the blockade. Consistently exposing himself to devastating hostile grenade, rifle and automatic weapons fire throughout repeated determined attempts by the enemy to break through, Lieutenant Colonel Harris fought gallantly with his men, offering words of encouragement and directing their heroic efforts in driving off the fanatic attackers. Stout-hearted and indomitable despite tremendous losses in dead and wounded, Lieutenant Colonel Harris, by his inspiring leadership, daring combat tactics and valiant devotion to duty, contributed to the successful accomplishment of a vital mission and upheld the highest traditions of the United States Naval Service.

— Board of Awards, Serial 1089, 17 October 1951

Harris also received the Purple Heart, the Prisoner of War Medal, the Combat Action Ribbon, the Korean Service Medal, the United Nations Service Medal, the National Defense Service Medal, the Republic of Korea Presidential Unit Citation, the Korean War Service Medal and the World War II Victory Medal.

1st Row	Navy Cross		Purple Heart	
2nd Row	Combat Action Ribbon	Prisoner of War Medal	Asiatic-Pacific Campaign Medal	World War II Victory Medal
3rd Row	National Defense Service Medal	Korean Service Medal	Republic of Korea Presidential Unit Citation	United Nations Korea Medal

== See also ==
- List of Navy Cross recipients for the Korean War
