= Unbroken: Path to Redemption =

2018 sequel film directed by Harold Cronk

- Theatrical release poster
- Directed by: Harold Cronk
- Screenplay by: Richard Friedenberg; Ken Hixon
- Based on: Unbroken by Laura Hillenbrand
- Produced by: Matthew Baer; Mike Elliott
- Starring: Samuel Hunt; Merritt Patterson; Vanessa Bell Calloway; Bobby Campo; Maddalena Ischiale; David DeLuise; Bob Gunton; David Sakurai; Gary Cole; Will Graham
- Cinematography: Zoran Popovic
- Edited by: Amy McGrath
- Music by: Brandon Roberts
- Production companies: Universal 1440 Entertainment; The Wta Group; Matt Baer Films
- Distributed by: Pure Flix Entertainment (United States); Universal Pictures Home Entertainment (International)
- Release date: September 14, 2018
- Running time: 98 minutes
- Country: United States
- Language: English
- Budget: $6 million
- Box office: $6.2 million

Unbroken: Path to Redemption is a 2018 American Christian drama film directed by Harold Cronk, and is the sequel to the 2014 film Unbroken. Because of the much lower budget, none of the original cast or crew returned, except the producer Matthew Baer and actors Vincenzo Amato and Maddalena Ischiale. The film chronicles the rest of Louis Zamperini's story, following his return from World War II. The film features a role from evangelist Will Graham, who portrays his grandfather, Billy Graham.

It was theatrically released by Pure Flix Entertainment in the United States on September 14, 2018. It received generally negative reviews from critics, who criticized it as "a dull drama", but was given high ratings by audiences and grossed just over $6 million against its $6 million production budget.

== Plot summary ==
Based on Laura Hillenbrand's bestselling book, the film begins where the movie Unbroken concludes, sharing the next chapter of the true story of Olympian and World War II veteran Louis Zamperini. Haunted by nightmares of his torment, Louie sees himself as anything but a hero.

Louie's PTSD-driven quest for revenge drives him deeper into despair and alcoholism, putting the couple on the brink of divorce until Cynthia experiences Billy Graham's 1949 Los Angeles Crusade, where both find faith in Jesus Christ, a renewed commitment to their marriage, and Louie finds forgiveness for his wartime captors.

== Cast ==
- Samuel Hunt as Louis Zamperini, a former Olympian, World War II Bombardier, and later former POW who has recently been rescued and sent back home, and currently haunted by his past. He decides to seek God's grace and forgiveness in Jesus Christ. He was previously portrayed by Jack O'Connell in the original film.
- Merritt Patterson as Cynthia Applewhite-Zamperini, Louis' wife
- Vincenzo Amato as Anthony Zamperini, Louis' father.
- Vanessa Bell Calloway as Lila Burkholder
- Bobby Campo as Pete Zamperini, Louis' brother
- Bob Gunton as Major Zeigler
- Maddalena Ischiale as Louise Zamperini
- David Sakurai as Mutsuhiro "The Bird" Watanabe, a sadistic Japanese warden and Louis' torturer who appears in flashbacks. He was previously portrayed by Japanese musician Miyavi in the original film.
- Gary Cole as George Bailey
- Will Graham as Billy Graham, an American pastor who changes Zamperini's life by having him hear the gospel. Actor Will Graham is the real-life grandson of Billy Graham.
- David DeLuise as Howard Lambert
- Gianna Simone as Sylvia Zamperini, Louis' sister. She was previously portrayed by Savannah Lamble in the original film.
- April Bowlby as Cecy Phillips

== Release ==
The film was originally going to be released on October 5, 2018, but was moved up from its original release to September 14, 2018.

=== Box office ===
In the United States and Canada, Unbroken: Path to Redemption was released alongside White Boy Rick, A Simple Favor and The Predator, and was projected to gross $2–6 million from 1,620 theaters in its opening weekend. It ended up debuting to just $2.2 million, finishing tenth at the box office. It dropped 40% in its second weekend to $1.3 million, finishing 12th.

=== Critical response ===
On review aggregator Rotten Tomatoes, 40% of 25 critics gave the film a positive review, with an average rating of 5.5/10. The website's critics consensus reads: "Unbroken: Path to Redemption overestimates the power of its inspirational real-life story, settling for a dull drama that too often preaches to the choir." According to Metacritic, which assigned a weighted average score of 38 out of 100 based on seven critics, the film received "generally unfavorable reviews". Audiences polled by CinemaScore gave the film an average grade of "A" on an A+ to F scale, while PostTrak reported that filmgoers gave it 4 out of 5 stars.

== See also ==
- Captured by Grace, a documentary about Louis Zamperini.
