= Ōmori =

Area in Ōta-ku, Tokyo, Japan

Coordinates: 35°35′23″N 139°43′44″E

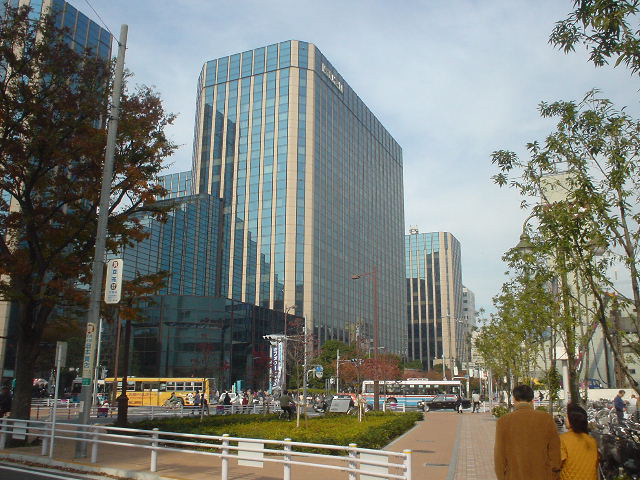
Omori Bell Port

Ōmori (大森) is a district located a few kilometres south of Shinagawa, Tokyo, Japan accessed by rail via the Keihin Tohoku line, or by road via Dai Ichi Keihin. Ōmorikaigan, the eastern area of Ōmori, can be reached via the Keikyu line.

Ōmori is one of many areas in Tokyo's largest ward, Ōta-ku, but as Ōmori train station is located close to the border with Shinagawa-ku, some buildings bearing the name Ōmori, such as the Omori Bell Port complex, are located in Shinagawa-ku.

Prior to its development as a residential and business location, Ōmori was a fishing village along the Tōkaidō Highway and famous for its farming of nori seaweed, a staple of the Japanese diet.

== Areas ==
There are six neighbourhoods in Ōta with the place name Ōmori: Ōmorihonchō, Ōmorihigashi, Ōmorikita, Ōmoriminami, Ōmorinaka and Ōmorinishi. All of them are located on the east side of the tracks of the Tōkaidō Main Line railway.

Other neighborhoods in the vaguely defined Ōmori area include Sannō, or unofficially Ōmori-sannō, to the west of Ōmori station. It is an upscale neighbourhood compared to the other side of the tracks. The area is known for the poets, philosophers, and writers who made their homes there. The area was formerly home to the German International School before its relocation to Yokohama.

== History ==
=== Ōmori-ku, Tokyo ===
Ōmori was a ward of former Tokyo City. In 1932, Ōmori-ku was formed with the territories of former municipalities of Higashi-Chōfu, Ikegami, Iriarai, Magome, and Ōmori. In 1947, Ōmori-ku merged with Kamata-ku to form the present Ōta-ku.

=== World War II POW Camp ===
Ōmori was the site of an Imperial Japanese Army-administered prisoner-of-war camp during World War II. The inhumane conditions in the camp were described in detail in the book Unbroken: A World War II Story of Survival, Resilience, and Redemption describing the life of American Olympic Athlete Louis Zamperini. The camp was brutal, and included in its staff was known war criminal Mutsuhiro Watanabe. However, US Navy submarine commander Richard O'Kane found Omori camp harsh, but essentially correct in administration, particularly compared with the Ōfuna Imperial Japanese Navy detention centre. Local anti-militarist Japanese civilians sometimes helped the prisoners with small gifts of food.

=== Other notable events ===
Four years after the opening of the railway through the area, Ōmori Station was opened in 1876. In the next year, Edward S. Morse discovered the Ōmori Shell Mound from a train window.

In 1932, there was a bank robbery at Kawasaki Daihyaku Bank Ōmori Branch, one of the first cases of bank robbery in Japan.

On August 24, 1938, a mid-air collision above Ōmori showered debris on an iron works there, killing at least 53 people on the ground.

== Education ==
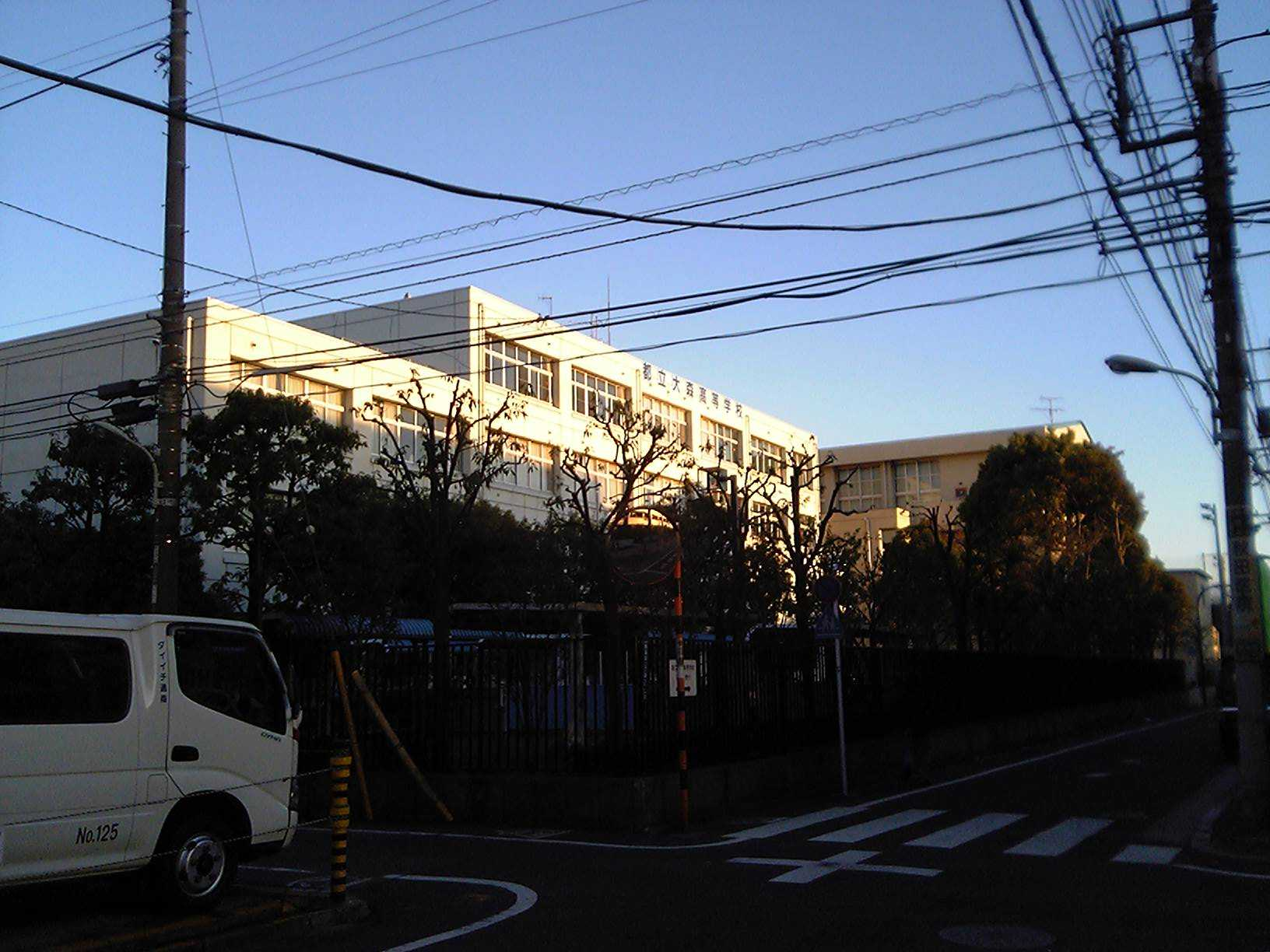
Omori High School

Ota operates the public elementary and junior high schools in Ōmori.

Tokyo Metropolitan Government Board of Education operates Ōmori High School and Mihara High School.

Private high schools include Omori Gakuen High School.

== Parks ==
- Heiwa-no-mori Park. Largest park in Ota-ku (99,000 m^{2})
- Heiwajima Park. Includes: baseball ground; barbecue park (2,200 yen for ward residents, 2,600); swimming pool (inside and outside)
- Ōmori-furusato-no-hamabe Park. Maritime park. Local elementary school children call it "Furuhama". Particulars: Free entrance; Closed at night; Fishing is allowed in the rocky stretch of water; Campfires are not allowed; Benches and some tables available; Drinking water; Toilets and no showers; The chlorine count usually exceeds the "suitable to swim" level so swimming is prohibited); No shade from sun, and unlike Odaiba beach, there are no shops around the beach; Parking lot is not near.
