= Mutsuhiro Watanabe =

Japanese soldier (1918–2003)

- 渡邊 睦裕
- Born: 18 January 1918
- Died: 1 April 2003 (aged 85)
- Military career
- Allegiance: Empire of Japan
- Branch: Imperial Japanese Army
- Service years: 1941–1945
- Rank: Sergeant
- Nickname: "The Bird"
- Conflicts: World War II

Sergeant Mutsuhiro Watanabe (渡邊 睦裕, Watanabe Mutsuhiro; 18 January 1918 – 1 April 2003), nicknamed "The Bird" by his prisoners, was a Japanese soldier who served in several prisoner-of-war camps during World War II. Infamous for his mistreatment of Allied prisoners of war, after the surrender of Japan in 1945 American occupational authorities classified Watanabe as a war criminal for his mistreatment and torture of POWs, but he managed to elude arrest and was never tried in court.

== World War II ==
Watanabe served at POW camps in Omori, Naoetsu (present-day Jōetsu), Niigata, Mitsushima (present-day Hiraoka) and at a civilian POW camp in Yamakita.

While in the military, Watanabe allegedly ordered one man who reported to him to be punched in the face every night for three weeks and practiced judo on an appendectomy patient. One of his prisoners was American track star and Olympian Louis Zamperini. Zamperini reported that Watanabe beat his prisoners often, causing them serious injuries. Watanabe made one officer sit in a shack, wearing only a fundoshi undergarment, for four days in winter, and that he tied a 65-year-old prisoner to a tree for days. According to Laura Hillenbrand's book, Watanabe had studied French, in which he was fluent, and had an interest in the French school of nihilist philosophy.

== Later life and death ==
In 1945, General Douglas MacArthur included Watanabe as number 23 on his list of the 40 most wanted war criminals in Japan.

However, Watanabe went into hiding and was never prosecuted when Washington suspended the arrest warrants of suspected war criminals after the San Francisco Peace Treaty went into effect on April 1, 1952. In 1956, the Japanese literary magazine Bungeishunjū published an interview with Watanabe, titled "I do not want to be judged by America." He later became an insurance salesman.

Prior to the 1998 Winter Olympics in Nagano, the CBS News program 60 Minutes interviewed Watanabe at the Hotel Okura Tokyo as part of a feature on Louis Zamperini who, aged 80, was returning to carry the Olympic Flame torch through Naoetsu en route to Nagano, not far from the POW camp where he had been held. In the interview, Watanabe acknowledged beating and kicking prisoners, but was unrepentant, saying, "I treated the prisoners strictly as enemies of Japan." Zamperini attempted to meet with Watanabe as he had with his other wartime captors, but Watanabe refused to see him.

Watanabe died on 1 April 2003, at 85 years old.

== Legacy ==
Accounts of Watanabe's abusive behavior are given in:

- Laura Hillenbrand's book about Zamperini titled Unbroken: A World War II Story of Survival, Resilience, and Redemption (2010)
- Alfred A. Weinstein's 1948 memoir, Barbed Wire Surgeon
- Tom Henling Wade's 1994 memoir, Prisoner of the Japanese: From Changi to Tokyo

In 2014, Japanese musician Miyavi played Watanabe in Angelina Jolie's Unbroken, the film adaptation of Hillenbrand's book. David Sakurai portrays Watanabe in Harold Cronk's Unbroken: Path to Redemption, a "spiritual successor" to Jolie's film, released in 2018.
