= Unbroken (book) =

Biography of Louis Zamperini by Laura Hillenbrand

Unbroken: A World War II Story of Survival, Resilience, and Redemption
- Author: Laura Hillenbrand
- Original title: Unbroken
- Cover artist: Tom Hallman
- Language: English
- Genre: Biography
- Publisher: Random House
- Publication date: November 16, 2010
- Media type: Print
- Pages: 473
- ISBN: 978-1-4000-6416-8
- OCLC: 613293334
- LC Class: D805.J3 Z364 2010

Unbroken: A World War II Story of Survival, Resilience, and Redemption is a 2010 non-fiction book by Laura Hillenbrand. Unbroken is a biography of World War II veteran Louis Zamperini, a former Olympic track star who survived a plane crash in the Pacific Theater, spent 47 days drifting on a raft, and then survived more than two and a half years as a prisoner of war (POW) in three Japanese POW camps.

Unbroken spent more than four years on The New York Times best seller list, including 14 weeks at number one. It is the 5th longest-running nonfiction best seller of all time.

== Background ==
Inspired by the story Come on SeaBiscuit in childhood, as an adult Hillenbrand wrote Seabiscuit: An American Legend (2001). While researching that novel, Hillenbrand came across a 1938 newspaper article about Zamperini. The discovery led Hillenbrand to tell the story of Zamperini's experience as a prisoner of war (POW) during World War II. “Unbroken” (2010) became a New York Times Bestseller and formed the basis for a feature film.

== Synopsis ==
Zamperini grows up in a Christian home. In his youth, he is a troublemaker in his hometown of Torrance, California, stealing and stashing food, liquor, and cigarettes. He is also bullied for his Italian background.

Zamperini is caught by law enforcement and returned to his family. Although his father disciplines him with beatings, his behavior does not improve.

Coached by his older brother, Pete, Zamperini soon begins to pursue running. Pete rides a bicycle alongside Louis as he runs home from school, ringing the bike bell as encouragement. This positive reinforcement changes Zamperini, who then joins his high school track team. Subsequently, he begins to win races, and becomes known as the Torrance Tornado. Training at a college track facility, Louis becomes acquainted with James Sasaki, a man he presumes to be Japanese-American.

In 1936, Zamperini earns a place on the U.S. Olympic Team to compete in the Berlin Olympic Games. Pete walks his younger brother to the train station for his departure to Germany. At the station, Zamperini says that this first Olympic Games will just be a “try-out” for the next Olympics 4 years later in Tokyo, Japan. Pete tells Louis to never forget that “a moment of pain is worth a lifetime of glory”.

At the Olympics, Zamperini participates in the opening ceremonies as the Olympic Torch is lit, and notices a Japanese contestant who politely nods at him. Competing in the 5,000 meter race against more experienced athletes, Zamperini first seems to fall behind. As the second lap bell rings, he remembers Pete’s words and rallies to place 8th with a time of 14 minutes, 46.8 seconds.

Following the start of World War II, Zamperini’s running career abruptly ends. He enlists in the United States Army Air Corps and becomes a bombardier, and is subsequently assigned to the Pacific theater to a squadron based in the Hawaiian Islands. Zamperini and his crew grow close during this time.

When his plane, the Super-Man, bombs a Japanese target, it is hit over five hundred times. Despite failed brakes, the crew is able to crash land at their air field. All but one of the crew survive the ordeal.

As he awaits his next mission, Zamperini continues to train, trying to beat his own record. His crew’s aircraft is replaced with a less reliable plane, the Green Hornet. While Zamperini’s crew understands that the Green Hornet is an unreliable plane, his superiors insist that it is flight-worthy.

When his crew is assigned a search mission, Zamperini observes that their mission involves “a lot of ocean”. The Green Hornet crashes due to mechanical difficulties 850 miles (1,370 km) south of Oahu, killing eight of the 11 men aboard.

The survivors, Louis Zamperini, Phil, and Mac, are wounded and face a grave future. Phil becomes seriously depressed. Mac goes through various mental breakdowns and eats all the chocolate rations.

The survivors also become creative, devising ways to obtain fresh water and food. After the first day at sea, they attempt to signal a plane with no luck. The men are able to capture an albatross. When they attempt to eat it, they become ill. Instead, they use the meat of the bird for fish bait. When they catch and eat a fish raw, Phil remarks that the Japanese eat their fish raw.

Aware of past records for survival at sea, the survivors carefully track the passage of time. Phil recalls that another air crew that was stranded at sea for 24 days. To pass time and maintain sanity, Zamperini talks about his mother’s cooking.

By Day 18, Zamperini and Phil both seriously question their unfortunate fate. During a terrible storm, Zamperini prays, promising God that he will dedicate his life to Him.

On their 28th day at sea, the survivors signal a plane. The enemy plane makes two strafing runs, damaging both life rafts. Zamperini and Phil manage to repair a life raft. Mac dies soon after.

Louie and Phil survive 46 days at sea and are captured by the Japanese. They are first taken to a small base camp, given an insufficient meal, and subjected to interrogation.

After a few days, both men are made to strip. Their guards hose them down and shave their hair in preparation for transfer to POW camps. Phil and Zamperini are separated. Placed on a bus blindfolded, Zamperini speaks to another POW named Tinker, Zamperini asks “Is this Tokyo, I’ve always wanted to go to Tokyo”. Tinker replies “Be careful what you wish for”.

At the POW camp, a camp leader nicknamed “The Bird” introduces himself to the new arrivals. The Bird states that the POWs are enemies of Japan and shall be treated accordingly. Zamperini glances at the Bird who then orders Zamperini to look at him but beats Zamperini whenever he does so.

In their barracks, the other POWs recognizes the wounds on Zamperini as the work of the Bird. The POWs explain that the nickname “The Bird” refers to their tormentor’s way of constantly watching and listening.

During one of their morning “trainings”, the Bird calls out Zamperini as an Olympic athlete and forces him to race against one of the camp guards. When the weakened Zamperini loses, he is beaten and called a failure in order to demoralize him.

In a talk with a senior POW, Zamperini expresses that he would rather be killed than watch others be tortured. The reply is that “the only way to beat them would be to make it out alive”.

Japanese officers tell Zamperini that everyone in America thinks he is dead. Zamperini is offered a deal: in return for speaking on the radio to announce that he is alive and well, Zamperini could spend a day outside the camp. During this time, Zamperini recognizes one of the Japanese officers as none other than James Sasaki, an acquaintance during training as a track athlete at a college in the USA.

After Zamperini goes through with the initial broadcast, the Japanese offer him an opportunity to take part in propaganda broadcasts in exchange for a more comfortable life outside of the camp. Zamperini experiences discomfort at the sight of other clean and well-dressed American personnel taking part in this kind of collaboration with the Japanese.

When Zamperini declines, he is sent back to the camp. The Bird sets out to punish Zamperini. One punishment involves other prisoners punching Zamperini in the face.

When the camp comes under attack, the prisoners are moved to a coal production facility and told to work or be killed. Zamperini spends weeks at the camp, but when he rests briefly, he is taken away to be punished.

The Bird orders Zamperini to hold a large beam over his head under threat of death. Zamperini endures for 37 minutes and stares down the Bird until the Bird snaps and severely beats Zamperini.

As the war comes to an end, the camp guards scatter and American planes drop food and other supplies to the POWs. Eventually, Zamperini returns to the United States. Upon his return to the United States, Zamperini kisses the ground.

Zamperini is reunited with his family. He meets Cynthia Applewhite and they marry after knowing each other for two months. They have a daughter. However, traumatized by his wartime ordeal, without a career, and unable to pursue his love of running, Zamperini becomes an alcoholic. Cynthia seeks a divorce.

When evangelist Billy Graham comes to town, Cynthia convinces Zamperini to attend a revival meeting. There Zamperini recalls his bargain while lost at sea and the bargain that he made with God. Zamperini is inspired to turn his life around, which saves his marriage.

Over time, Zamperini forgives all who wronged him during WWII. Zamperini returns to Japan where he locates and makes peace with many of his former tormentors. When the Bird refuses to meet him, Zamperini sends him a letter to express his forgiveness.

Zamperini takes part in the torch relay for the 1998 Olympic Winter Games in Nagano. As a gesture of reconciliation and resilience, he carries the torch past one of the locations where he was once imprisoned.

== Character list ==
Louis Zamperini: A child of Italian immigrants, born in 1917. Olympic middle distance runner (1936) who becomes a POW during World War II.

Pete Zamperini: Louis Zamperini's older brother, his role model and first running coach.

Louise Zamperini: Louis’ mother, who refuses to give up on Louis for dead.

Anthony Zamperini: Louis’ father, depicted as a disciplinarian.

Sylvia Zamperini: One of Louis’ two sisters.

Virginia Zamperini: One of Louis’ two sisters.

Glenn Cunningham: An athlete who serves as one of Louis’ biggest role models.

James Kunichi Sasaki: Sasaki is a Japanese man who becomes friends with Louis in the United States long before his POW capture. Sasaki reappears at the Ofuna camp, as a head interrogator.

Russell Allen Phillips: Russell / “Phil”, a survivor of the Green Hornet crash alongside Louis and one of Louis’ best friends. Initially they were both imprisoned at Ofuna but Phil was relocated. He survives the war and marries.

Francis McNamara: Francis / “Mac”, the third survivor of the crash of the Green Hornet, buried at sea.

Gaga: Gaga was a pet duck of the Ofuna POWs killed by the guards.

The Quack: An unnamed Japanese officer who beats Bill Harris for creating a map of the camp and a Japanese-English dictionary.

William Harris: William / Bill, one of the first people Louis meets at Ofuna camp, known for his photographic memory and language skills.

Mutsuhiro Watanabe: Known as “The Bird”, a sadistic guard at Ofuna, intent on breaking Louis down.

Cynthia Applewhite Zamperini: Louis’ wife, who meets Louis in Miami Beach after the war and marries him against the wishes of her parents after two months. Cynthia leads Louis to seek spiritual guidance when he succumbs to alcoholism.

Billy Graham: The evangelist who inspires Louis’ post-war spiritual reawakening that lifts him out of alcoholism and despair.

== Publication ==
Unbroken: A World War II Story of Survival, Resilience, and Redemption was officially published on November 16, 2010 by Random House Publishing Group. Soon after its publication, the book was praised on the New York Times Bestseller list and remained on the list for a consecutive 160 weeks. As of 2014, the book sold over 5.5 million copies.

== Awards and honors ==
- 2010 Publishers Weekly "Top 10 Best Books"
- 2010 The New York Times Best Seller list (Nonfiction)
- 2010 Time magazine's "Top 10 Nonfiction Books" (#1)
- 2010 Los Angeles Times Book Prize finalist (Biography)
- 2011 Indies Choice Book Awards (Adult Non-Fiction)
- 2011 Dayton Literary Peace Prize shortlist
- 2012 Andrew Carnegie Medals for Excellence in Fiction and Nonfiction longlist

== Adaptations ==
A feature film based on the book was adapted by Universal Pictures and Legendary Pictures. Angelina Jolie served as the film's director, while the Coen brothers, Richard LaGravenese, and William Nicholson wrote the screenplay. Jack O'Connell portrays Louis Zamperini and the film had its general release on Christmas 2014 to mixed reviews but was a box office success.

A subsequent movie, Unbroken: Path to Redemption was made as a sequel in 2018 to this first movie, to less success than the first one.
