= Gianna Simone =

American actress, model, and producer (born 1989)

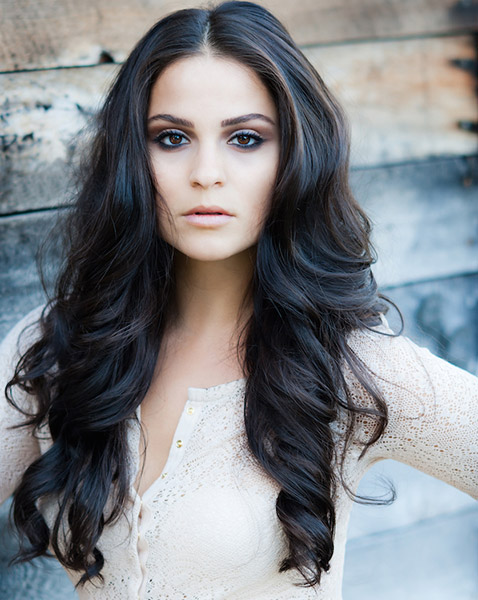
- Born: December 22, 1989 (age 35); Boston, Massachusetts, U.S.
- Occupations: Actress; model; producer
- Organization: Gianna Simone Foundation

Gianna Simone (born December 22, 1989) is an American actress, model, and producer. She has appeared in roles in the feature films Star Trek Into Darkness (2013), Mother's Day (2016), I Can Only Imagine (2018), Unbroken: Path to Redemption (2018), and several television series.

== Early life ==
Simone is originally from Boston, Massachusetts and during her youth, lived in East Boston, Chelsea, Revere, and Wilbraham. She was abused as a child and placed in Boston's foster care system at thirteen years old. Her father, Anthony Baxter, was unable to serve as her caretaker at the time, though Simone has since said that Baxter has been "a very positive influence" in her life and helped her make the decision to focus on acting. Around the time Simone entered the foster care system, she enrolled at a gym, where she met the owner Kathy DeMarco, who became her mentor. DeMarco introduced Simone to a small non-denominational Christian church and wanted to adopt the teenager, but died before doing so.

Simone attended Boston Latin Academy. Around age sixteen she began pursuing a modeling career.

== Career ==
Simone originally only wanted to focus on modeling, which she pursued despite opposition from agencies, and secured modeling work without agency representation for several years. She signed her first modeling contract with Boston's Maggie Inc. in 2009, and appeared in advertisements for the American Dental Association, Carolina Herrera, Elie Saab, Hasbro, New Balance, Reebok, and Vera Wang. In 2010, she appeared on the cover of Boston magazine at the age of 20, while living in Boston.

While pursuing modeling, Simone was encouraged to act by her colleagues. She began to focus on acting when she enrolled at Bunker Hill Community College and then joined the Screen Actors Guild shortly after. She relocated to Los Angeles at the age of 21. She has appeared in the feature films Star Trek Into Darkness (2013), 90 Minutes in Heaven (2015), God's Not Dead 2 (2016), Mother's Day (2016), and I Can Only Imagine (2018). She is slated to appear in the upcoming films Unbroken: Path to Redemption, God Bless the Broke Road, and Run the Race. Simone has also appeared in several television series, including Law & Order: Criminal Intent, Chuck, and Hitting the Breaks, which she co-produced with Pure Flix Entertainment through her company GS Productions. In 2015, she created the original series "Love Gianna", launched via YouTube channel by REBL HQ, the digital entertainment studio created by Maker Studios and Full Sail University.

In 2016, Livingly included Simone in their red carpet fashion rankings following the Cannes Film Festival and Teen Choice Awards. She was also included in Vogue Germany's "Best Dressed" list from the 2016 Cannes Film Festival.

== Personal life ==
Simone founded the Gianna Simone Foundation, which provides rescue as well as support to abused and neglected people and animals. The foundation is managed by the National Christian Foundation and supports youth in Maryvale (Los Angeles) and Rwandan genocide survivors. Simone also works with the animal rescue group Wings of Rescue, which relocates adoptable pets, on private planes, to no kill shelters and permanent homes. Simone also serves on the board of The Plantrician Project.

Simone is of Italian descent and identifies as a Christian and vegan. She likes extreme sports, including riding motorcycles and skydiving, and is an avid aerialist and target shooter. Simone resides in Los Angeles.

== Filmography ==
- 3rd Shift: Michael's Lament (2009)
- Beg (2011)
- Star Trek Into Darkness (2013)
- 90 Minutes in Heaven (2015)
- God's Not Dead 2 (2016)
- Mother's Day (2016)
- Run the Race (2017)
- I Can Only Imagine (2018)
- Unbroken: Path to Redemption (2018)
- God Bless the Broken Road (2018)

== Television ==
- Law & Order: Criminal Intent (1 episode: "Gods & Insects", season 9, 2010)
- Chuck (1 episode: "Chuck Versus the Wedding Planner", season 4, 2011)
- Hitting the Breaks (ten episodes, 2016)

== See also ==
- List of Chuck cast members
- List of Italian-American actors
