= Louis Zamperini: Captured by Grace =

2015 American documentary

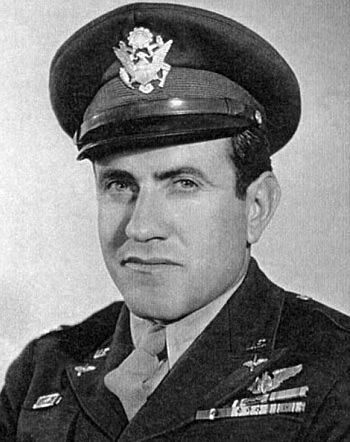
Louis Zamperini

Louis Zamperini: Captured by Grace is a 2015 documentary about American WWII veteran Louis Zamperini. The film depicts Zamperini's capture by the Japanese after his bomber crashed into the ocean in 1943, killing eight of the 11 men on board.

Captured by Grace was produced by the Billy Graham Evangelistic Association and includes portions of in-depth interviews with Zamperini. The film was released after the 2014 movie Unbroken, which portrayed Zamperini's WWII survival story and his time as an Olympic distance runner but did not delve into his life after the war. Zamperini battled with post-traumatic stress disorder and alcoholism, which threatened to destroy his marriage.

The film focuses on Zamperini's life after the war, including his violent nightmares and alcohol addiction. The film covers Zamperini's reluctant visit to evangelist Billy Graham's 1949 Los Angeles Crusade, which changed the trajectory of Zamperini's life. Zamperini said the message Billy Graham preached led him to enter into a relationship with Jesus Christ and to forgive his Japanese captors. Zamperini dedicated the rest of his life to sharing the gospel with others. He spoke at the 1958 Billy Graham crusade in San Francisco and maintained a lifelong friendship with Billy Graham.
