= Ōmori High School =

Coordinates: 35°34′16″N 139°42′34″E

- Japanese: 東京都立大森高等学校
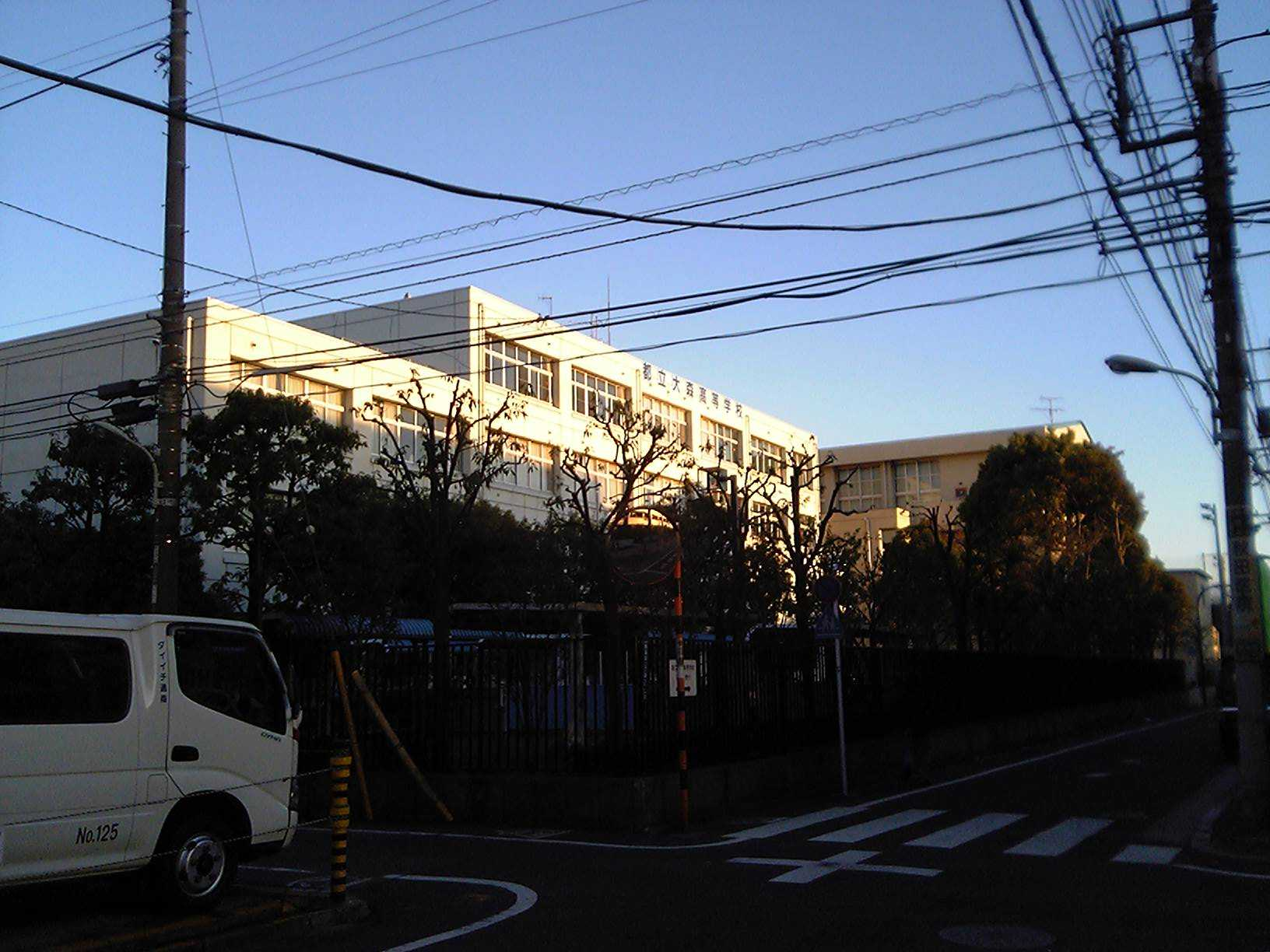

Information
- Other name: Morikō (Japanese: 森高)

Tokyo Metropolitan Ōmori High School (東京都立大森高等学校, Tōkyō Toritsu Ōmori Kōtōgakkō) is a Japanese high school located in the Ōmori area of Ōta, Tokyo. The school's nickname is Morikō (森高, roughly "Mori High").

Tōkyū Ikegami Line's Ikegami Station is located near the school.

== Club activities ==
Ōmori High School is home to a number of clubs, but is most known for its dance club. The club uploads regularly on their YouTube channel 東京都立大森高校ダンス部. Clubs are divided into sports and culture clubs. For sports, there is a basketball club, volleyball club, table tennis club, baseball club, track and field club, swimming club, tennis club, soft tennis club, judo club, kendo club, badminton club, and soccer club. Culture clubs include a light music club (K-on), drama club, cooking club, ikebana club (flower arrangement), science club, astronomy club, brass band club, art club, and tea ceremony club.

== See also ==
- List of high schools in Tokyo
