= Mónika Balsai =

Hungarian actress (born 1977)

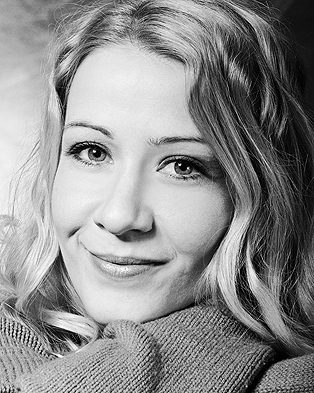
- Born: 13 December 1977 (age 48); Vác, Hungary
- Occupation: Actress

Mónika Balsai (born 13 December 1977) is a Hungarian actress.

== Selected filmography ==
- Liza, the Fox-Fairy (2015)
- Kills on Wheels (2016)
- Jupiter's Moon (2017)
