= Unbroken (film) =

2014 American war film

- Theatrical release poster
- Directed by: Angelina Jolie
- Screenplay by: Joel Coen; Ethan Coen; Richard LaGravenese; William Nicholson
- Based on: Unbroken by Laura Hillenbrand
- Produced by: Angelina Jolie; Matthew Baer; Erwin Stoff; Clayton Townsend
- Starring: Jack O'Connell; Domhnall Gleeson; Miyavi; Garrett Hedlund; Finn Wittrock
- Cinematography: Roger Deakins
- Edited by: Tim Squyres; William Goldenberg
- Music by: Alexandre Desplat
- Production companies: Legendary Pictures; Jolie Pas; 3 Arts Entertainment
- Distributed by: Universal Pictures
- Release dates: November 17, 2014 (Sydney); December 25, 2014 (United States)
- Running time: 138 minutes
- Country: United States
- Language: English
- Budget: $65 million
- Box office: $163.4 million

Unbroken is a 2014 American war drama film produced and directed by Angelina Jolie and written by the Coen brothers, Richard LaGravenese, and William Nicholson. It is based on the non-fiction book by Laura Hillenbrand, Unbroken: A World War II Story of Survival, Resilience, and Redemption (2010). The film stars Jack O'Connell as Army officer Louis "Louie" Zamperini, an American Olympian, and Miyavi as Imperial Japanese Army (IJA) corporal Mutsuhiro Watanabe. Zamperini survived in a raft for 47 days after his bomber ditched in the ocean during the Second World War, before being captured by the Japanese and being sent to a series of prisoner of war camps.

Filming took place in Australia from October 2013 to February 2014. Unbroken had its world premiere in Sydney on November 17, 2014, followed by a London premiere at the Odeon Leicester Square on November 26, 2014. The film was released in the United States on December 25, 2014.

It received mixed reviews from critics, though praise was given to O'Connell's performance and Deakins's cinematography. It was a financial success, grossing $163 million worldwide. The film was followed by the less successful sequel Unbroken: Path to Redemption in 2018.

== Plot ==
Louis "Louie" Zamperini is a bombardier in the United States Army Air Forces in World War II. An April 1943 bombing mission against Japanese installations on Nauru exposes him to danger. His B-24 Liberator is hit by enemy fire, a crewman is badly wounded, and the pilot, Phil, nurses the damaged aircraft to a stop just short of the end of the runway.

In a flashback to his youth in Torrance, California, Louie misbehaves by stealing, drinking alcohol and smoking. He is often bullied by others for his Italian ethnicity. His brother Peter trains him to be an athlete and Louie becomes a disciplined distance runner, earning the nickname "The Torrance Tornado". He finishes 8th in the 1936 Summer Olympics and sets a record in the final lap for the 5,000-meter race.

In his 1943 combat service, Louie flies on a search-and-rescue mission in a war-weary plane which loses engine power and crashes into the ocean. Louie, Phil and Mac are the only survivors. After 27 days adrift on two rafts, they're strafed by a Japanese fighter plane. Mac dies six days later. On the 47th day, Japanese sailors capture Louie and Phil. They become prisoners of war on Kwajalein Atoll and are interrogated for technical information on aircraft models and the Norden bombsight. Louie successfully navigates the interrogation without revealing important information, and the pair are transferred to Japan and split up. Louie goes to camp Ōmori, in Tokyo. Japanese corporal Mutsuhiro Watanabe is especially hard on Louie, beating him often. Louie is given an opportunity to broadcast a message home after learning the U.S. government classified him as KIA. He refuses to broadcast anti-American propaganda and returns to camp where Watanabe has each prisoner punch him.

After two years, Watanabe received a promotion and leaves the camp, but when the prisoners are transferred to Naoetsu prison camp, Sergeant Watanabe is again in command. When Louie pauses during work of loading coal barges, he is punished by Watanabe, who makes him lift a large wooden beam and hold it over his head. The sergeant orders a guard to shoot Louie if he drops it, but the American defiantly holds it up despite his exhaustion. The enraged Watanabe beats Louie for defiantly staring into his eyes. The prisoners are liberated when the Americans occupy Japan at the end of the war. Louie looks in Watanabe's quarters, finding he's fled, and is transfixed by a photo of Watanabe as a child. Louie returns to America and kisses the ground, embracing his family happy to be home.

The film ends with a slideshow of contemporary photos showing the post-war lives of the characters. Louie married and had two children. Phil married. Mutsuhiro "The Bird" Watanabe went into hiding and evaded prosecution despite being on the top 40 most-wanted Japanese war criminals list compiled by General Douglas MacArthur's staff. Louie lived out his promise to convert to Christianity, to devote his life to God and to forgive his wartime enemies. Louie met with many of his Japanese captors but Watanabe refused.

Louie was honored by running a leg of the Olympic Torch relay for the 1998 Winter Olympics in Nagano, Japan, four days short of his 81st birthday. His leg was near one of the POW camps where he was held. The closing titles reveal that Louie Zamperini died on July 2, 2014, at 97.

== Cast ==
- Jack O'Connell as Capt. Louis 'Louie' Zamperini, a former Olympian and bombardier who is held in captivity by the Japanese.
  - C.J. Valleroy as young Louis Zamperini
- Domhnall Gleeson as Lt. Russell 'Phil' Phillips, Louie's companion at sea and his capture
- Garrett Hedlund as Lt. Cmdr. John Fitzgerald (captain of submarine USS Grenadier)
- Miyavi as Sgt. Mutsuhiro 'The Bird' Watanabe, a sadistic prison camp commander who tortures and treats Louie cruelly.
- Finn Wittrock as T-3 S/Sgt. Francis 'Mac' McNamara
- Jai Courtney as Lt. Charlton Hugh 'Cup' Cupernell
- Luke Treadaway as Miller
- Spencer Lofranco as Harry Brooks
- Travis Jeffery as Jimmy
- Jordan Patrick Smith as Cliff
- John Magaro as Frank A. Tinker
- Alex Russell as Pete Zamperini, Louie's brother
  - John D'Leo as Young Pete
- Vincenzo Amato as Anthony Zamperini, Louie's father
- Louis McIntosh as William Frederick Harris
- Ross Anderson as Blackie
- Maddalena Ischiale as Louise Zamperini, Louie's mother
- Savannah Lamble as Sylvia Zamperini, Louie's younger sister
- Sophie Dalah as Virginia Zamperini, Louie's second younger sister
- David Roberts as Officer Collier

== Production ==
=== Development ===
Universal Pictures purchased the rights to the book in January 2011, having already acquired the film rights to Zamperini's life story towards the end of the 1950s. Early drafts for the film were written by William Nicholson and Richard LaGravenese while Francis Lawrence was scheduled to direct. Joel and Ethan Coen were then tapped to rewrite the script after Jolie was named director.

On September 30, 2013, Jolie was confirmed to direct the film in Australia. Jolie was paid a $1 million salary for directing the film. Walden Media was originally set as Universal's co-financier, but withdrew from the project prior to filming and were subsequently replaced by Legendary Pictures. The filming was based in New South Wales and Queensland, with scenes also shot in Fox Studios Australia and Village Roadshow Studios.

=== Filming ===
Principal photography began on October 16, 2013, in Queensland, Australia and ended on February 4, 2014, with post-production also being done in Australia.

Some of the scenes were shot at sea in Moreton Bay on October 16, 2013. On December 14, four days of filming were completed in Werris Creek, New South Wales.

The POW "Coal" scenes were all filmed at Cockatoo Island.

The scene where they were captured by the Japanese destroyer was filmed in Sydney Harbour on board the MV Cape Don.

=== Music ===
The official film soundtrack was released on December 15, 2014, through Parlophone and Atlantic Records. The film score was composed by Alexandre Desplat. The album also features "Miracles", a song written and recorded by British alternative rock band Coldplay, which was released digitally as a single on December 15.

== Reception ==
=== Box office ===
Unbroken grossed $115.6 million in the U.S. and Canada and $47.6 million in other territories for a worldwide total of $163 million, against a budget of $65 million.

The film opened in North America on December 25, 2014, across 3,131 theaters and grossed $15.6 million on its opening day (including Christmas Eve previews) which is the third-biggest Christmas Day debut ever, behind Les Misérables ($18 million), and Sherlock Holmes ($24 million) and the fifth-biggest Christmas Day gross ever. The film was one of the four widely released films on December 25, 2014, the other three being Walt Disney's Into the Woods (2,478 theaters), Paramount Pictures' The Gambler (2,478 theaters) and TWC's Big Eyes (1,307 theaters). It earned $31,748,000 in its traditional three-day opening weekend (including its revenue from Christmas Day it earned $47.3 million) debuting at #2 at the box office behind The Hobbit: The Battle of the Five Armies setting a record for the third-biggest Christmas debut behind Sherlock Holmes ($62 million) and Marley & Me ($36 million). and fourth biggest among World War II theme movies. It was the eighth film that earned $25 million plus in its debut weekend for Universal Pictures and the fifth $30 million plus debut for an "original" movie following Lone Survivor, Ride Along, Neighbors and Lucy.

=== Critical response ===
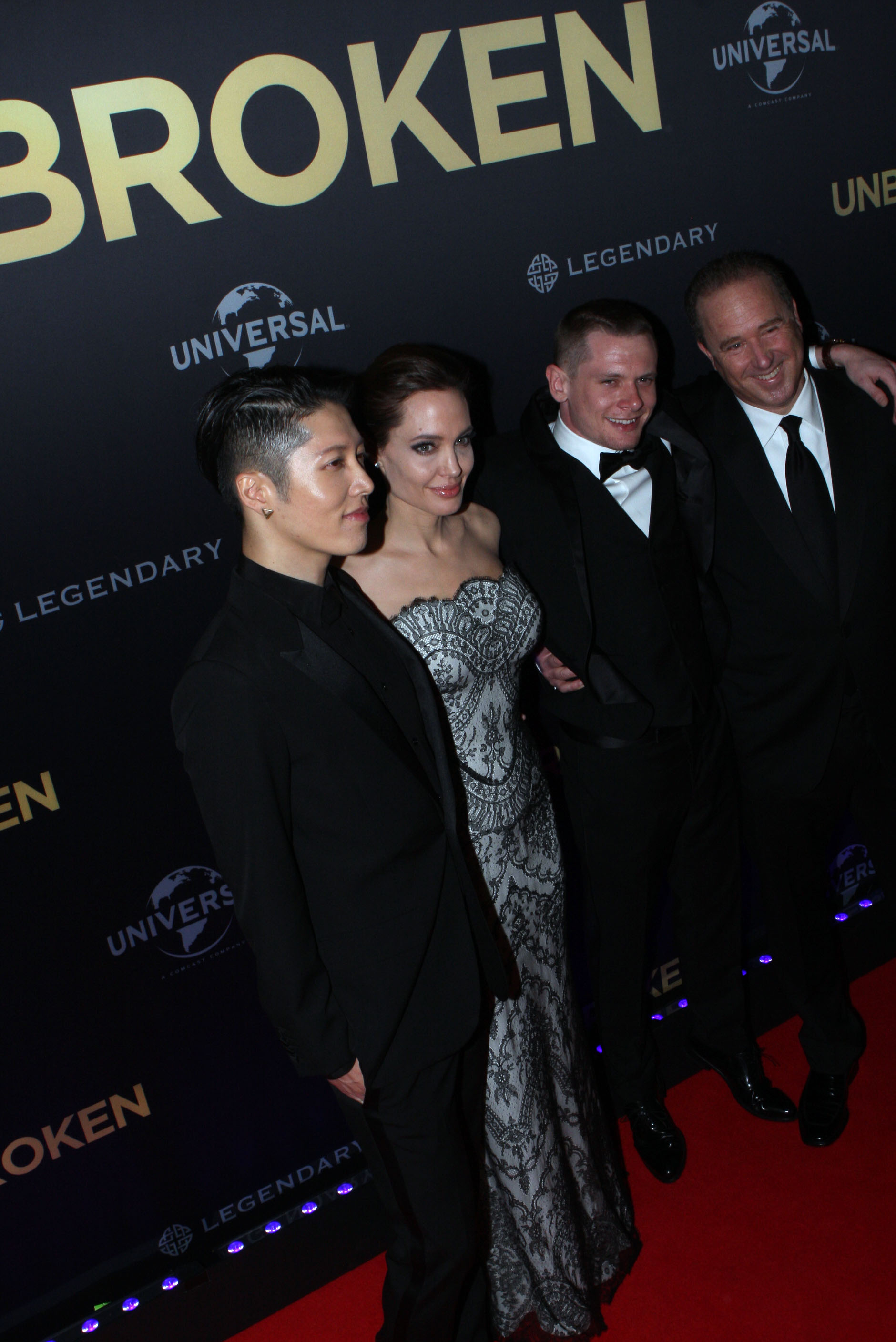
Miyavi, Angelina Jolie, Jack O'Connell and Matthew Baer at Unbroken World Premiere in Sydney

The film received mixed reviews from critics. Rotten Tomatoes gives the film a rating of 53% based on 230 reviews, with an average rating of 6.00/10. The website's critical consensus reads, "Unbroken is undoubtedly well-intentioned, but it hits a few too many of the expected prestige-pic beats to register as strongly as it should." On Metacritic, the film has a score of 59 out of 100 based on 48 reviews, indicating "mixed or average reviews". Audiences surveyed by CinemaScore gave the film an average grade of "A−" on an A+ to F scale. The audience was 52 percent female and 71 percent over the age of 25.

The SAG Nominating Committee gave it a standing ovation after a screening.

The score received a mixed critical reaction. Callum Hofler of Entertainment Junkie stated, "At its finest, Unbroken is perhaps Desplat's strongest and most resonant emotional work since The Tree of Life or Harry Potter and the Deathly Hallows – Part 2, both from 2011. It comes off as bold, ambitious, yet intimate and sentimental all the same. It can be an elegant and harmonious exploration of human determination, drive and spirit." He also criticized numerous components, claiming that, "In most cases though, the primary issue with the album is its lack of energy and vitality. There is many a time where [sic] the music seems to just sit in place, lacking major progression in character, motive or mindset." He awarded the score a final rating of 6 out of 10. Jorn Tillnes of Soundtrack Geek acclaimed the album, stating, "This score is pretty great. It's been a really good year for Desplat. Godzilla and The Monuments Men at the top of the pile, but this is not far behind." He summarized with, "It is a turning point though for those who think Desplat is about boring bass rhythms and motifs. This might even get the haters to respect him as a composer." He awarded the score an 87.8 out of 100.

=== Controversies ===
Prior to the film's release, some Japanese nationalists asked for the film and the director to be banned from their country, largely because of a part in Hillenbrand's book, which was not depicted in the film, where she accurately reported that "POWs were beaten, burned, stabbed, or clubbed to death, shot, beheaded, killed during medical experiments, or eaten alive in ritual acts of cannibalism" by the Imperial Japanese Army. A petition on Change.org calling for a ban attracted more than 10,000 signatures. In response, it triggered a Change.org petition by Dutch Indonesian group The Indo Project voicing support for the movie, as they saw it as a reflection of what their family members in the former Dutch East Indies experienced in Japanese camps. Several prominent Dutch Indos (including those who are not descendants of former POWs), such as author Adriaan van Dis, Doe Maar frontman Ernst Jansz, and actress Wieteke van Dort, signed the petition in support of the film. Another petition on Change.org calling for a release of the film in Japan, this time in Japanese, gathered more than 1,200 signatures. The film was eventually released in Japan on February 6, 2016, by independent distributor Bitters End on a much smaller scale than originally intended, while Toho-Towa, the usual distributor of Universal titles, had passed on releasing the film.

The film received some criticism for omitting Zamperini's fight against alcoholism and PTSD, as well as his Billy Graham-inspired religious conversion.

=== Accolades ===
List of awards and nominations
| Award | Date of ceremony | Category | Recipients | Result | References |
|---|---|---|---|---|---|
| Academy Awards | February 22, 2015 | Best Cinematography | Roger Deakins | Nominated | |
| Academy Awards | February 22, 2015 | Best Sound Editing | Becky Sullivan and Andrew DeCristofaro | Nominated | |
| Academy Awards | February 22, 2015 | Best Sound Mixing | Jon Taylor, Frank A. Montaño and David Lee | Nominated | |
| American Film Institute | December 8, 2014 | Top Eleven Films of the Year | | Won | |
| Art Directors Guild Awards | January 31, 2015 | Excellence in Production Design for a Period Film | Jon Hutman | Nominated | |
| ASC Award | February 15, 2015 | Theatrical Motion Picture | Roger Deakins | Nominated | |
| Cinema Audio Society Awards | February 14, 2015 | Outstanding Achievement in Sound Mixing for a Motion Picture – Live Action | David Lee, Jon Taylor, Frank A. Montaño, Jonathan Allen, Paul Drenning, John Guentner | Nominated | |
| Critics' Choice Movie Award | January 15, 2015 | Best Picture | | Nominated | |
| Critics' Choice Movie Award | January 15, 2015 | Best Director | Angelina Jolie | Nominated | |
| Critics' Choice Movie Award | January 15, 2015 | Best Adapted Screenplay | Joel and Ethan Coen, Richard LaGravenese, William Nicholson | Nominated | |
| Critics' Choice Movie Award | January 15, 2015 | Best Cinematography | Roger Deakins | Nominated | |
| Empire Awards | March 29, 2015 | Best Male Newcomer | Jack O'Connell | Nominated | |
| Hollywood Film Awards | November 14, 2014 | New Hollywood Award | Jack O'Connell | Won | |
| Houston Film Critics Society Awards | January 12, 2015 | Best Cinematography | Roger Deakins | Nominated | |
| Make-Up Artists and Hair Stylists Guild Awards | February 14, 2015 | Best Period and/or Character Make-Up in Feature Length Motion Picture | Toni G. and Nik Dorning | Nominated | |
| MPSE Golden Reel Awards | February 15, 2015 | Feature English Language – Dialogue/ADR | Becky Sullivan, Andrew DeCristofaro, Laura Atkinson, Glynna Grimala, Lauren Hadaway | Won | |
| MPSE Golden Reel Awards | February 15, 2015 | Feature English Language – Effects/Foley | Becky Sullivan, Andrew DeCristofaro, Jay Wilkinson, Eric A. Norris, David Raines, Dan O'Connell, John T. Cucci, Karen Triest, Dan Hegeman, Nancy MacLeod, Darren "Sunny" Warkentin | Nominated | |
| National Board of Review | December 2, 2014 | Top 10 Films | | Won | |
| National Board of Review | December 2, 2014 | Breakthrough Performance | Jack O'Connell (also for Starred Up) | Won | |
| Saturn Awards | June 25, 2015 | Best Action or Adventure Film | Unbroken | Won | |
| Saturn Awards | June 25, 2015 | Best Editing | William Goldenberg, Tim Squyres | Nominated | |
| Screen Actors Guild Awards | January 25, 2015 | Outstanding Action Performance By Stunt Ensemble Motion Picture | Unbroken | Won | |
| St. Louis Film Critics Association | December 15, 2014 | Best Adapted Screenplay | Joel and Ethan Coen, Richard LaGravenese, William Nicholson | Nominated | |
| St. Louis Film Critics Association | December 15, 2014 | Best Cinematography | Roger Deakins | Nominated | |
| Visual Effects Society Awards | February 4, 2015 | Outstanding Supporting Visual Effects in a Photoreal/Live Action Feature Motion Picture | Bill George, Steve Gaub, Erin Dusseault, Dave Morley, Brian Cox | Nominated | |
| MovieGuide Awards | | Best Movie for Mature Audiences | Unbroken | Won | |

=== Home media ===
Unbroken was released on March 24, 2015, in the United States in two formats: a one-disc standard DVD and a Blu-ray Combo pack (Blu-ray + DVD + Digital Copy).

== Sequel ==
A faith-based film also based on Hillenbrand's book, titled Unbroken: Path to Redemption, which depicts later events of Zamperini's life than those depicted in Unbroken, was released by Pure Flix Entertainment on September 14, 2018. It was directed by Harold Cronk with the script written by Richard Friedenberg and Ken Hixon. Aside from producer Matthew Baer and actors Vincenzo Amato and Maddalena Ischiale, who reprised the roles of Anthony and Louise Zamperini, none of the original cast or crew was involved in the new film. Legendary Pictures also had no involvement with the sequel. The sequel was much less successful than the original movie; receiving less favorable reviews and breaking even on its budget.

== See also ==
- The Great Raid, a 2005 war film about the raid at Cabanatuan in the Philippines during World War II.
- To End All Wars, a 2001 film set in a Japanese prisoner of war labor camp where the inmates are building the Burma Railway during World War II.
- Merry Christmas, Mr. Lawrence
- My Way, a 2011 South Korean war film based on the story of a Korean captured by the Americans on D-Day.
- List of films about the sport of athletics
- List of World War II films
