= Liza, the Fox-Fairy =

- Theatrical release poster
- Liza, a rókatündér
- Directed by: Károly Ujj Mészáros
- Written by: Károly Ujj Mészáros; Bálint Hegedűs
- Based on: Liselotte és a május by Zsolt Pozsgai
- Produced by: István Major, Csanád Darvas^{(as associate producer)}
- Starring: Mónika Balsai; Szabolcs Bede-Fazekas; David Sakurai
- Cinematography: Péter Szatmári
- Edited by: Judit Czakó
- Music by: Dániel Csengery; Ambrus Tövisházi
- Production company: Filmteam
- Release date: 19 February 2015
- Running time: 98 minutes
- Country: Hungary
- Language: Hungarian
- Budget: $1.5–1.6 million
- Box office: $$532,381

Liza, the Fox-Fairy (Hungarian: Liza, a rókatündér) is a 2015 Hungarian black comedy film directed by Károly Ujj Mészáros, starring Mónika Balsai, Szabolcs Bede-Fazekas and David Sakurai. The film drew an audience of over 100,000 in Hungary.

The film's music was elected as one of 2015's "catchiest soundtracks" in Hungary and four songs were recorded on a limited 7-inch vinyl.

== Plot ==
Liza is a 30-year-old, naïve, lonely nurse living in "Csudapest", (Note: A portmanteau from csuda (or csoda) ’miracle’ and Budapest, the capital of Hungary) the capital of a fictionalized 1970s Hungary with a capitalist system. She has taken care of Márta, the widow of the former Japanese ambassador, for the last 12 years. Taking inspiration from a cheap Japanese romance novel, on her 30th birthday, Liza goes to a Mekk Burger restaurant in hopes of falling in love. While she’s away, Márta is killed by Liza's only friend, Tomy Tani, the ghost of a Japanese pop singer from the 1950s, resulting in Liza inheriting her apartment. Relatives report Liza to the police for murdering Márta. Sergeant Zoltan is put on the case, who gets very nearly killed in the process, and falls slowly in love with Liza after moving into her apartment as a flatmate. She gains confidence, but all her dating efforts end in fatal accidents. Liza is convinced that she has become a fox-fairy, a demon from Japanese mythology. According to the legend, men who fall in love with a fox-fairy die soon afterwards, and the fox-fairy is doomed to be alone forever.

== Cast ==
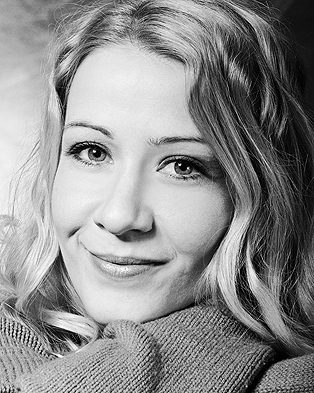
Mónika Balsai

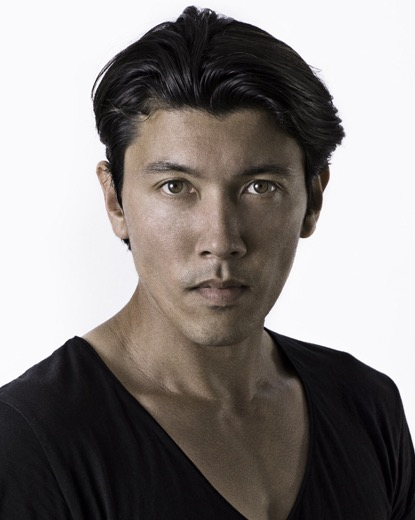
David Sakurai

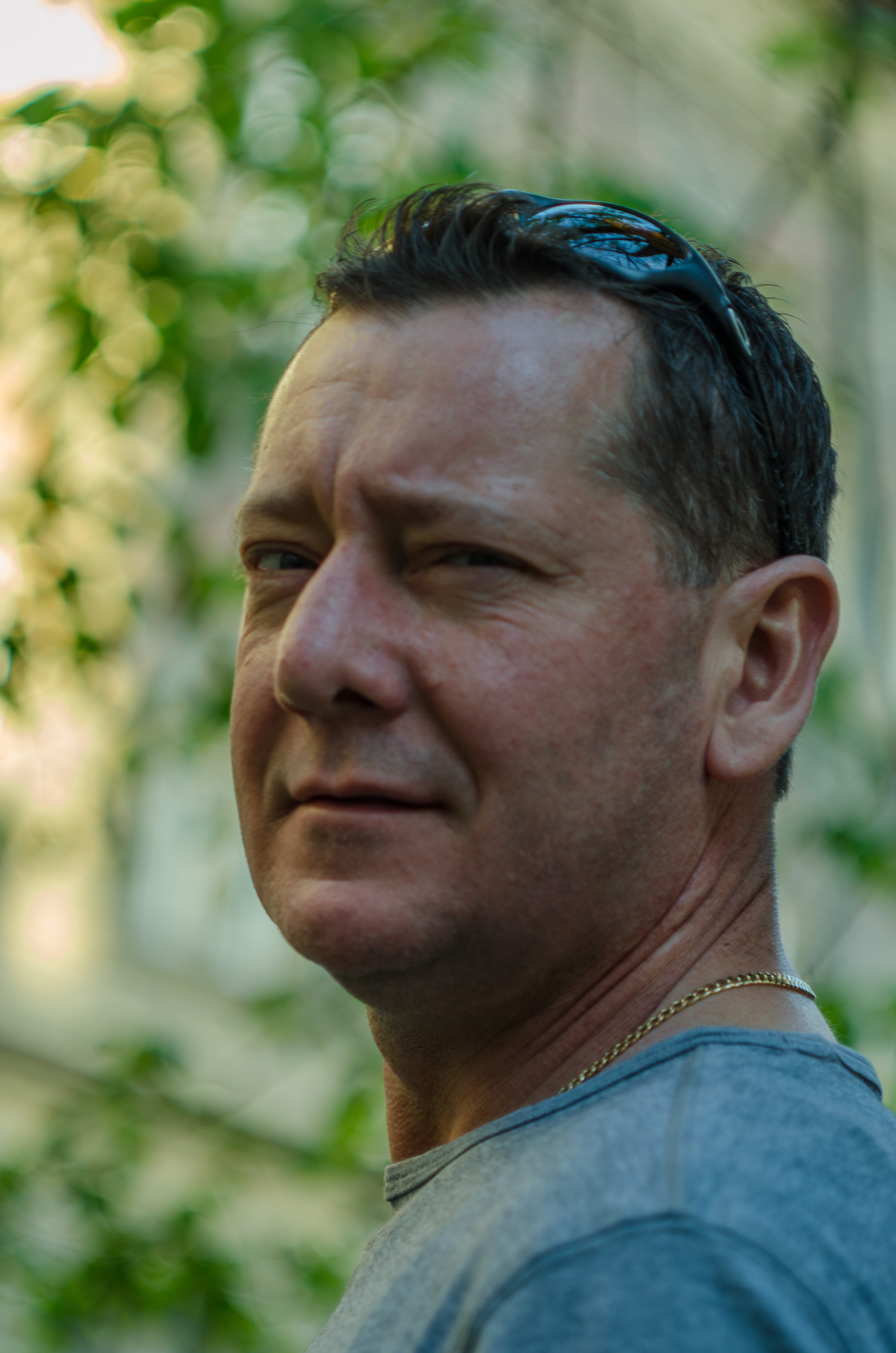
Szabolcs Bede-Fazekas

- Mónika Balsai as Liza, the Fox-Fairy
- David Sakurai as Tomy Tani
- Szabolcs Bede-Fazekas as Sergeant Zoltán
- Piroska Molnár as Márta, the widow of a Japanese Ambassador to Hungary
- Zoltán Schmied as Henrik
- Antal Cserna as Károly
- Gábor Reviczky as police Colonel
- Mariann Kocsis as Hildácska
- Ági Gubík as Inge
- Lehel Kovács as Mr. Ludvig
- Győző Szabó: Mr B., or Jonny
- János Bán as Heartbreak
- István Hajdu as Ferenc, a manager
- László Nádasi as staff sergeant
- Sándor Szűcs as police doctor
- Nóra Diána Takács as Police Secretary
- Dezső Rancsó as chimney sweeper
- Vali Dániel as Teri
- Zsuzsa Töreky as Edit
- Mária Bókay as Vilma
- István Gőz as Dr. Keserű
- Kata Bartsch as Kriszta
- Klára Jarábik as Orsi
- Rodrigo Crespo as Orsi's husband
- Batjav Batod as Eskimo
- Zoltán Karácsonyi as Teleshop Giovanni
- Katalin Kiss Horváth as Johnny's daughter
- Orsolya Mihály as Mekk Burger's salesgirl
- Andrea Balázs as sick-nurse
- Katalin Ben as Malvinka
- Kata Losonczi as Timi
- Gyöngy Bérces as Cosmo cover girl
- Gábor Harsányi as Narrator (voice)

== Production ==
The film is based on the play Liselotte és a május by Zsolt Pozsgai. The Japanese theme was added by Károly Ujj Mészáros, who was fascinated by Japanese culture, especially pop music from the 1960s and 1970s. He was also attracted by similarities between Japanese and Hungarian traditions. He had directed several commercials in Japan, which gave him further familiarity with Japanese culture. The film was produced by Filmteam with co-production support from Origo Film Group. The budget was 420 million forint (~1.6 million USD), of which 220 million came from the Hungarian National Film Fund. The cast rehearsed for a month before filming started.

== Release ==
The film was released theatrically in Hungary on 19 February 2015. It was also screened at various film like Fantasporto Film Festival in Portugal) on 2 March 2015 and Seattle International Film Festival (USA) on 25 May 2015.

== Awards ==
- 31st Imagine Film Festival

- Silver Scream Award, Méliès d’Argent for the best European fantastic film

nominated for Golden Méliès

- The audiences top-3 of the festival

- 33rd Brussels International Fantastic Film Festival (BIFFF)

- 7th Orbit Award for Best Film (haven’t already been presented at Brussels and have been produced in the last two years, attributed by a national jury of professionals)
- The Pegasus Award, Prize of the Audience

- Nocturna 2015 - Madrid International Fantastic Film Festival

- "Paul Naschy" Award(Best Film)
- Best Director
- Best Play: Actor (Szabolcs Bede-Fazekas) and Actress (Mónika Balsai)
- Best Screenplay (Note: (ex aequo with the US-Canadian film Exeter))
- Best Special Effects

- Fantaspoa - XI. International Fantastic Film Festival of Porto Alegre

- Best Actress (Mónika Balsai)

- 41st Seattle International Film Festival

- Grand Jury Prize, New Directors Competition (Károly Ujj Mészáros)

- 8th CinEmaCity International Film Festival - Serbia and the region

- Cineuropa Prize, which singles out the best international film hailing from the Danube countries

- 10th Fantastic Fest - Austin

- Audience award 2nd Place

- 21st Lund International Fantastic Film Festival − Lund

- Siren Award for best international film,
- Audience Award for Best Feature

- 4th Monsters of Film - Stockholm

- Audience Award for Best Feature

- 3rd Cellar Door Film Festival - Ottawa

- Audience Award for Best Feature

- 15th Hungarian Film Festival of Los Angeles

- Best Film "Hungarians in Hollywood" Award: Károly Ujj Mészáros
- Best Actress Award jury prize: Mónika Balsai

- 29th Leeds International Film Festival - Leeds

- Audience Award for New Narrative Feature

- 17th European Film Festival in Essonne - Ris-Orangis

- Grand Prix (2015)

- 54th Hungarian Film Critics Award - Budapest

- Best First Film of 2015 (Károly Ujj Mészáros)

== Adaptation ==
An Indian adaptation of the film, titled Aafat-E-Ishq, was released on October 29, 2021.
