= David Sakurai =

Japanese-Danish actor, director, scriptwriter, and martial artist

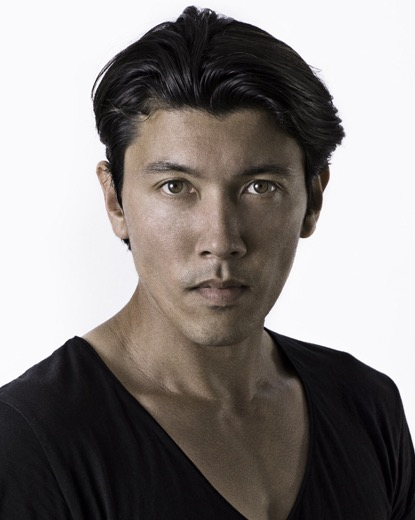
- David Sakurai on Jesper Skoubølling's photo
- Born: 19 July 1979 (age 46); Copenhagen, Denmark
- Occupations: Actor, director, scriptwriter, martial artist
- Years active: 2006–present

David Sakurai (Copenhagen, 19 July 1979) is a Danish Japanese actor, director, scriptwriter and martial artist.

== Biography ==
David Sakurai was born in Copenhagen to a Japanese father and a Danish mother and raised in Frederiksværk, Denmark. He has a brother named Kristoffer, who is a former dancer.

Sakurai was interested in filmmaking from a young age and at the age of 18 moved to Japan, where he also learned acting. He played smaller roles in theatre and in indie films, like Tokyo G.P. in 2001 and Scarlet Runaway in 2005.

Sakurai returned to Denmark in 2008, mainly because he wanted to work with Jack Hansen and other talented new directors and in his native tongue. Here he continued training under the Danish Actors' Association. He played one of his first leading roles in Eastern Army. He worked with Stellan Skarsgård, Steven Van Zandt and Hans Petter Moland, among others.

In 2012, Sakurai starred in Hungarian dark romantic comedy Liza, the Fox-Fairy, which won the Grand Prize at Portuguese film festival Fantasporto in 2015.

Sakurai has trained in Wing Chun and Muay Thai, among other martial art styles.

Sakurai lives in Los Angeles with his wife.

== Filmography ==
- 2006 Skyggen af tvivl (short film) - Lars
- 2007 Fighter - fighter
- 2009 No Right Turn - waiter
- 2010 Tour de Force - Hiru
- 2010 Wasteland Tales - stranger
  "Eastern Army"
  "I Barbari Dei Cph" (scriptwriter, producer)
- 2010 Tony Venganza - Shiba
- 2011 Hapa (short film) - "self"; (scriptwriter, director, producer)
- 2011 Shaky González/The Last Demon Slayer - Jiro (martial arts choreography)
- 2012 Emma (short film, Supernatural Tales video) - Bastian
- 2012 Ud af mørket - Johnny; (scriptwriter, director, producer)
- 2012 Hitman: Absolution (video game) - several characters
- 2012–2014 Lilyhammer (Norwegian television series) - Tensing
- 2013 Detektiverne (Danish youth thriller) - Sony Kazu
- 2014 Kraftidioten - Kinamann
- 2014 Echoes of a Ronin (short film) - Shin; (scriptwriter, producer)
- 2014 Dark Samurai - Miyamoto
- 2015 Liza, the Fox-Fairy (Hungarian dark romantic comedy) - Tomy Tani
- 2017 Iron Fist - Scythe
- 2017 Housewife - Bruce O’Hara
- 2018 Unbroken: Path to Redemption - Mutsuhiro “The Bird” Watanabe
- 2018 Fantastic Beasts: The Crimes of Grindelwald - Krall
- 2018 Origin - Murakawa
- 2020 Doorman as Andre
- 2024 Avatar: The Last Airbender as an Earthbender

== Awards ==
- 2010 Best Actor and Audience Awards (Eastern Army; Movie Battle Film Festival, Copenhagen)
- 2010 Breakout Action Star (Action On Film International Film Festival, Los Angeles)
- 2011 GoVisual Award (Hapa, shared with I Am Your Ecstacy; Nordisk Film Festival)
