= Seabiscuit: An American Legend =

1999 non-fiction book by Laura Hillenbrand

- The cover of the paperback version
- Author: Laura Hillenbrand
- Language: English
- Publisher: Random House
- Publication date: June 30, 1999
- Publication place: United States
- Media type: Various
- Pages: 416 (hardcover); 399 (softcover)
- ISBN: 978-0-375-50291-0 (hardcover); ISBN 978-0-449-00561-3 (softcover)
- OCLC: 46369186
- Dewey Decimal: 798.4/0092/9 21
- LC Class: SF355.S4 H56 2001b

Seabiscuit: An American Legend is a non-fiction book written by Laura Hillenbrand, published in 1999. The book is a biography of the Thoroughbred racehorse Seabiscuit. It won the William Hill Sports Book of the Year and was adapted as a feature film in 2003. It has also been published under the title Seabiscuit: The True Story of Three Men and a Racehorse.

== Reception ==
Seabiscuit: An American Legend enjoyed near universal acclaim, with most praise centering on the compelling nature of the story and expert storytelling of Hillenbrand, who had done much research. Praising her accounts of the races, the Sports Illustrated writer Ron Fimrite said, "She writes about the confusion, turbulence and artistry of a race with the same grasp of sound and movement that Whitney Balliett brings to jazz in his 'New Yorker' profiles [...] no mean accomplishment." The Economist found "the research is meticulous, the writing elegant and concise, so that every page transports you back to the period," and Jim Squires of the New York Times likewise called her research "meticulous." Newsweek noted that "what chiefly distinguishes this account is the straightforward pleasure Hillenbrand takes in the accomplishments of her heroes, two-footed and four-footed alike." People magazine said that "Hillenbrand's jargon-free language makes the races--and the period--exhilarating." More conservatively, Karen Valby with Entertainment Weekly found "Hillenbrand's account ... saddled by loosely connected anecdotes and confused scene-setting," finally giving the book a grade of a "B". William Nack, the author of Secretariat: The Making of a Champion, stated: "You had clearly created a world, and you had done so with a distinctly lyrical feel and touch."

== Awards and honors ==
- 2001 National Book Critics Circle Award finalist (General Nonfiction)
- 2001 William Hill Sports Book of the Year (2001)
- 2001 Time magazine's "Best Books of the Year" (Non-fiction #4)
- 2001 Los Angeles Times Book Prize finalist (Biography)
- 2001 New York Times Notable Book of the Year
- 2001 Washington Post "Best Books"
- 2001 Fresh Air (National Public Radio) "Best Nonfiction of the Year" (#1)
- 2001 People Magazine "Best Pages"
- 2001 USA Today "Sports Book of the Year" (#1)
- 2001 New York Magazine "Best Books"
- 2001 The Economist "Best Books"
- 2001 St. Louis Post-Dispatch "Best Books"
- 2001 Los Angeles Times "Best Books of the Year"
- 2001 Christian Science Monitor "Recommended Books"
- 2001 Barnes & Noble "Best Books in History, Biography, and Sports"
- 2001 Salon Book Award (Nonfiction)
- 2001 Amazon's Best Books of the Year
- 2001 New York Times bestseller (Nonfiction)
- 2002 Book Sense Book of the Year winner (Adult Nonfiction)
- 2002 ALA Notable Books for Adults
- 2003 New York Times bestseller (Nonfiction)
- 2003 Academy Award for Best Adapted Screenplay nominee
- 2003 JRA Equine Cultural Award

== See also ==
- Horse racing
