= Laura Hillenbrand =

American writer (born 1967)

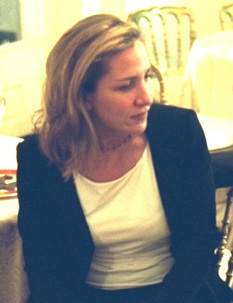
- Hillenbrand in 2003
- Born: May 15, 1967 (age 59); Fairfax, Virginia, U.S.
- Occupation: Author
- Spouse: Borden Flanagan (m. 2006; div. 2015)
- Writing career
- Genre: non-fiction
- Notable works: Seabiscuit: An American Legend; Unbroken: A World War II Story of Survival, Resilience, and Redemption
- Notable awards: Christopher Award (2011)

Laura Hillenbrand (born May 15, 1967) is an American author. Her two bestselling nonfiction books, Seabiscuit: An American Legend (2001) and Unbroken: A World War II Story of Survival, Resilience, and Redemption (2010), have sold over 13 million copies, and each was adapted for film. Her writing style is distinct from New Journalism, dropping "verbal pyrotechnics" in favor of a stronger focus on the story itself.

Hillenbrand fell ill in college and was unable to complete her degree. She shared that experience in an award-winning essay, A Sudden Illness, published in The New Yorker in 2003. Her books were written while she was disabled by myalgic encephalomyelitis, also known as chronic fatigue syndrome. In a 2014 interview, Bob Schieffer said to Laura Hillenbrand: "To me your story – battling your disease... is as compelling as his (Louis Zamperini's) story."

== Career ==
Hillenbrand began her career as a freelance magazine writer, pitching and submitting stories to various publications. Initially, she began submitting stories while living in a tiny apartment in Chicago. Having been forced by her ill health to suspend her studies at Kenyon College in Ohio, she turned to freelance writing as a focus until she could return to school. Her fiancé was working on his PhD at the time.

She first wrote for Equus magazine with a story called Surviving Fractures in June 1990 (Equus 152). This piece catalogued innovations in equine orthopedic surgery. She continued to contribute to the magazine and in 1997 she became a contributing editor.

Equus editors were impressed by Hillenbrand's dedication to her research and getting to the essence of a story. Consequently, she produced some of the magazine's most powerful stories. Many of these stories would provide her with the perfect preparation for the book she would eventually write. One in particular, Of Love and Loss, from Equus 238, was a special report exploring the dimensions of grief associated with the death of a horse. Hillenbrand recalled:

“That was one of my favorites. I learned so much about how an animal’s passing is unique, and it was gratifying because the story was so well received by EQUUS readers. In fact, I still occasionally hear from people who were touched by it.”

Her first book was the acclaimed Seabiscuit: An American Legend (2001), a nonfiction account of the career of the great racehorse. She won the William Hill Sports Book of the Year in 2001 for this book. She says she was compelled to tell the story because she "found fascinating people living a story that was improbable, breathtaking and ultimately more satisfying than any story [she'd] ever come across." She first covered the subject in an essay, "Four Good Legs Between Us", that was published in American Heritage magazine. Given positive feedback, she decided to proceed to write a full-length book.

In a C-Span record of a rare personal appearance on 29 August 2002 to promote Seabiscuit, Hillenbrand said:

"When you're a journalist you get used to working for almost no money and nobody earns less than I did. You tell stories because you want to tell stories and this was the story I waited my career for."

The book received positive reviews for the storytelling and research. It was adapted as the film Seabiscuit, nominated for Best Picture of 2003 at the 76th Academy Awards.

Hillenbrand's second book, Unbroken: A World War II Story of Survival, Resilience, and Redemption (2010), was a biography of World War II hero Louis Zamperini, an Olympian track runner. The book's film adaptation is called Unbroken (2014).

These two books topped the best seller lists in both hardback and paperback. Combined, they sold more than 10 million copies, which was reported in 2016 to have increased to over 13 million copies.

Hillenbrand's essays have appeared in The New Yorker, Equus magazine, American Heritage, The Blood-Horse, Thoroughbred Times, The Backstretch, Turf and Sport Digest, and other publications. Her 1998 American Heritage article on the horse Seabiscuit won the Eclipse Award for Magazine Writing.

Hillenbrand is a co-founder of Operation International Children.

== Writing style ==
Hillenbrand's writing style belongs to a new school of nonfiction writers, who come after the new journalism, focusing more on the story than a literary prose style:

Hillenbrand belongs to a generation of writers who emerged in response to the stylistic explosion of the 1960s. Pioneers of New Journalism like Tom Wolfe and Norman Mailer wanted to blur the line between literature and reportage by infusing true stories with verbal pyrotechnics and eccentric narrative voice. But many of the writers who began to appear in the 1990s ... approached the craft of narrative journalism in a quieter way. They still built stories around characters and scenes, with dialogue and interior perspective, but they cast aside the linguistic showmanship that drew attention to the writing itself.

== Personal life ==
Hillenbrand was born in Fairfax, Virginia, the daughter and youngest of four children of Elizabeth Marie Dwyer, a child psychologist, and Bernard Francis Hillenbrand, a lobbyist who became a minister.

Hillenbrand spent much of her childhood riding bareback "screaming over the hills" of her father's Sharpsburg, Maryland farm. A favorite childhood book of hers was Come On Seabiscuit (1963). She studied at Kenyon College in Gambier, Ohio but was forced to leave before graduation when she contracted chronic fatigue syndrome, with which she has struggled ever since. Until late 2015, she lived in Washington, D.C. and rarely left her house because of the condition.

Hillenbrand married Borden Flanagan, a professor of government at American University and her college sweetheart, in 2006. In 2014, they separated after 28 years as a couple, living in separate homes. Their divorce was finalized in 2015.

In January 2015, she was interviewed by James Rosen of Fox News at her home in Georgetown, primarily about how she had written the book Unbroken; Rosen noted her improved health, as the interview had been put off multiple times since 2010 due to her ill health. She mentioned in the interview how her subject, Louis Zamperini, inspired her in facing her own life problems during their many phone calls with his unfailing optimism. She said that Zamperini had read her essay about her own illness, which was partly why he opened up about his life so thoroughly, trusting that she could understand what he had endured. She stated that her primary literary influences were writers of fiction, including Hemingway, Tolstoy, and Jane Austen.

== Chronic fatigue syndrome ==
At Kenyon College, Hillenbrand had been an avid tennis player, cycler, and football player. At age 19, in her sophomore year, Hillenbrand experienced the sudden onset of an unknown sickness while driving back to school from spring break. She became ill and, three days later, could hardly sit up in bed or walk to classes. "Terrified, confused, she dropped out of school" and her sister drove her home. She was diagnosed with chronic fatigue syndrome at Johns Hopkins. Hillenbrand said it was the most hellish year of her life. In 2011 Hillenbrand said of her diagnosis:

This is why I talk about it. You can’t look at me and say I’m lazy or that this is someone who wants to avoid working. The average person who has this disease, before they got it, we were not lazy people; it’s very typical that people were Type A and hard, hard workers. I was that kind of person. I was working my tail off in college and loving it. It’s exasperating because of the name, which is condescending and so grossly misleading. Fatigue is what we experience, but it is what a match is to an atomic bomb.

Hillenbrand's family and friends did not understand her sickness and pulled away, leaving Hillenbrand to battle an unknown disease on her own. She was met with ridicule and told she was lazy during the first ten years of her sickness. In 2014, she said, "'I was not taken seriously, and that was disastrous. If I’d gotten decent medical care to start out with — or at least emotional support, because I didn’t get that either — could I have gotten better? Would I not be sick 27 years later?'”

She described the onset and early years of her illness in an award-winning essay, A Sudden Illness in 2003. The disease structured her life as a writer, keeping her mainly confined to her home. She read old newspaper articles by buying the old newspapers or borrowing them from libraries, rather than using microfilm or other forms of archived news articles, and did all her live interviews by telephone.

On the irony of writing about physical paragons while being so incapacitated herself, Hillenbrand said, "I'm looking for a way out of here. I can't have it physically, so I'm going to have it intellectually. It was a beautiful thing to ride Seabiscuit in my imagination. And it's just fantastic to be there alongside Louie as he's breaking the NCAA mile record. People at these vigorous moments in their lives – it's my way of living vicariously."

In a 2014 interview, Bob Schieffer said to Laura Hillenbrand: To me your story – battling your disease ….is as compelling as his (Louis Zamperini’s) story. By the time of her January 2015 interview with Ken Rosen, her ability to function had improved after hitting a real low during the writing of Unbroken; she increased her ability to walk down her stairs by taking one step and returning to bed, then some days later, two steps, until she could go down the whole staircase, a process that took several months. When Rosen and his crew met her, she was not having trouble with her balance or with vertigo. When asked about her health, she reported having myalgic encephalomyelitis (M.E.), formerly called Chronic Fatigue Syndrome.

In 2015–2016, Hillenbrand reported changes in her health in an interview with Paul Costello for Stanford Medicine: "Recently, Hillenbrand has made a lot of changes in her medical treatments and in her life. There’s optimism in her voice and a sense of wonderment at new beginnings." Vertigo has been a serious problem for her, so that she had not left Washington D. C. since 1990 because of it. After a disciplined effort to tolerate riding in a car, starting at five minutes and increasing to two hours over two years, she was able to drive out of Washington D. C. after 25 years. She is not cured, "I was not well. I am not well. I am always dealing with symptoms," [emphasis in original]. The changes in her health allowed her to make a cross-country trip to Oregon. She has also begun horse riding and bicycle riding, two activities she had not done since the disease struck her in 1987.

Preceded by Lance Armstrong	William Hill Sports Book of the Year winner 2001	Succeeded by Donald McRae
