= Equus (magazine) =

American monthly magazine for horse owners

- Frequency: Quarterly
- Total circulation: 131,740 (2011)
- First issue: November 1977
- Company: Equine Netword
- Country: United States
- Based in: Gaithersburg, Maryland
- Language: English
- Website: equusmagazine.com
- ISSN: 0149-0672

Equus is a quarterly magazine for horse owners that was first published in November 1977.

The intent of the magazine is succinctly stated by founding editor and publisher Ami Shinitzky's original working title: The Horseman's Veterinary Journal. In the editorial in the first issue Shinitzky wrote, "EQUUS serves as a bridge between the veterinarian and the horse owner, bringing to our readers the expertise of the nation's leading authorities on the care and maintenance of the animal through the talents of writers who are able to translate often technical information into a language easily understood and rapidly absorbed."

Carrying the slogan, "The horse owner's resource", Equus is meant to be collected by subscribers so they might use articles in past issues as a reference. Each issue has a prominent issue identification number on the cover (e.g., the June 2005 issue is "Equus 332"), and an index to articles is published annually.

After the June 1998 sale of Shinitzky's Fleet Street Publishing to Primedia Inc., the magazine was published by Primedia Equine Group. From 2007 to 2010, with the completion of the sale of the PRIMEDIA Enthusiast Media group, the publisher was Source Interlink. In 2010, Equus was purchased by Active Interest Media and is based in Gaithersburg, Maryland. In 2021, Active Interest Media sold its Equine Network properties to Growth Catalyst Partners.

== Mission ==
EQUUS provides information from veterinarians, equine researchers, riders, and trainers on understanding and influencing equine behavior, recognizing the warning signs of illness and disease, and solving riding and training problems.
