= Louis Zamperini =

American athlete and army officer (1917–2014)

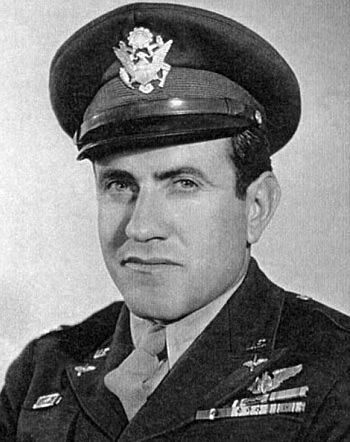
- Zamperini in 1943

Personal information
- Nicknames: The Zamp; Torrance Tornado
- Born: Louis Silvie Zamperini; January 26, 1917 Olean, New York, U.S.
- Died: July 2, 2014 (aged 97) Los Angeles, California, U.S.
- Education: University of Southern California
- Height: 5 ft 10 in (178 cm)
- Weight: 132 lb (60 kg)
- Spouse: Cynthia Applewhite (m. 1946; died 2001)
- Children: 2

Sport
- Country: United States
- Sport: Track and field
- Event: Middle-distance running
- College team: University of Southern California

Achievements and titles
- Olympic finals: 1936 Berlin: 5000 m – 8th
Personal best
800 m:	1:53.2 (1938)
1500 m:	3:52.6 (1939)
5000 m:	14:46.8 (1936)
Mile run:	4:08.3 (1938)
	4:07.6 i (1940)
- Military career
- Branch: U.S. Army Air Forces
- Service years: 1941–1946
- Rank: Captain
- Unit: 372nd Bomb Squadron
- Wars: World War II
- Awards: Distinguished Flying Cross

Louis Silvie Zamperini (January 26, 1917 – July 2, 2014) was an American World War II veteran, Olympic distance runner, and Christian evangelist. He began running in high school and qualified for the United States in the 5,000 m event at the 1936 Summer Olympics, where he finished eighth and set a new lap record.

Zamperini was commissioned in the United States Army Air Forces as a lieutenant. He served as a bombardier on B-24 Liberators in the Pacific. On a search and rescue mission, his plane experienced mechanical difficulties and crashed into the ocean. After drifting at sea on a life raft for 47 days, with two other crewmates, Zamperini landed on the then Japanese Marshall Islands and was captured.

He was taken to a total of four different prisoner-of-war camps in Japan, where he was tortured and beaten by Japanese military personnel—including Mutsuhiro Watanabe—because of Zamperini's status as a famous Olympic runner. He was later taken to a new prison camp at a coal factory, and after much hardship, he was finally released. Following the war he initially struggled to overcome his ordeal, afflicted with post-traumatic stress disorder and alcoholism.

He later became a Christian evangelist with a strong belief in forgiveness. From 1952 onwards, he devoted himself to at-risk youth. Zamperini is the subject of three biographical films: Unbroken (2014), its sequel Unbroken: Path to Redemption (2018), and Captured by Grace (2015).

== Early life ==
Louis Zamperini was born on January 26, 1917, in Olean, New York, to Anthony Zamperini (1889-1975) and Louise Dossi (1898-1993), both native to Verona in northern Italy. He had an older brother named Pete (1915-2008) and two younger sisters, Sylvia (1918-2008) and Virginia (1923-2008). He was raised in a strict, devout Catholic household. Regardless, he took up smoking at age 5 and drinking at age 8. He struggled with bullies and supposedly almost died twice, once due to a house fire, and another from having fallen into an oil rig, almost drowning. In later childhood, his brother Pete was highly supportive of him and encouraged him to start his running career.

=== Childhood ===
The Zamperini family moved from Olean, New York to Long Beach, California when Louis Zamperini was two years old. In 1919, the family moved to nearby Torrance where Louis attended Torrance High School. He and his family spoke no English when they moved to California, making him a target for bullies because of his Italian roots. His father taught him how to box in self-defense. Soon he claimed to be "beating the tar out of every one of them; but I was so good at it that I started relishing the idea of getting even. I was sort of addicted to it."

=== High school ===
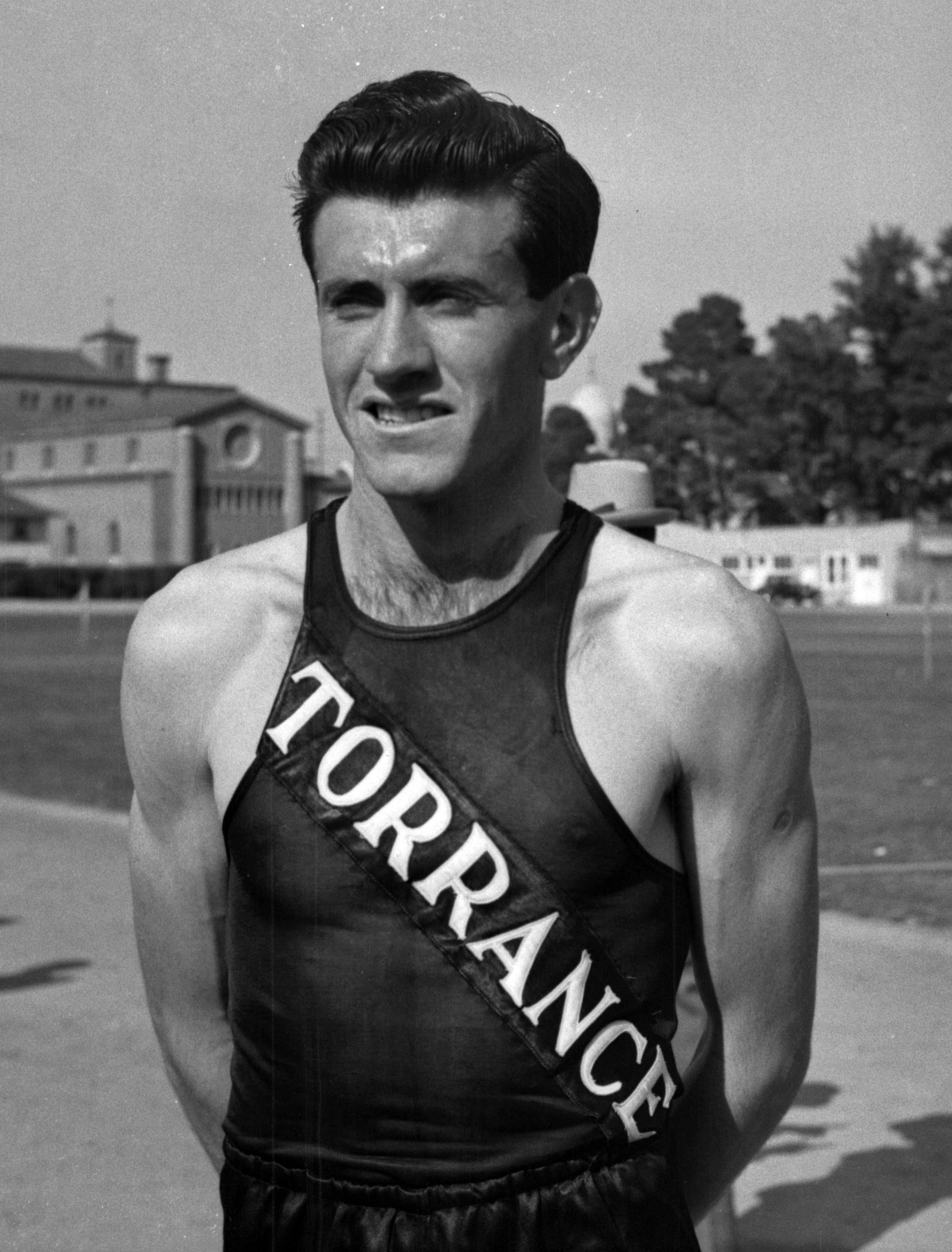
Zamperini wearing a Torrance High School track uniform, 1938

To stop Zamperini from getting into trouble, his older brother Pete got him involved in the school track team, where Pete was already a star. Before then, in the ninth grade, Zamperini's classmates challenged him to a footrace. Louis came in last, and was humiliated. Pete took Louis on several training runs. Zamperini began winning races, and he was becoming much faster. After Louis found his role model, Glenn Cunningham, he took up distance running. At the end of his freshman year, he finished fifth in the All City C-division 660 yards (600 m) dash.

It was the recognition, nobody in school, except for a few of my buddies, knew my name before I started running. Then, as I started winning races, other kids called me by name. Pete told me I had to quit drinking and smoking if I wanted to do well, and that I had to run, run, run. I decided that summer to go all-out; overnight I became fanatical. I wouldn't even have a milkshake.

After a summer of running in 1932, starting with his first cross-country race, and throughout the last three years of high school, he was undefeated. He started beating his brother's records. On May 10, 1934, he set a national high school record for the mile, clocking in at 4 minutes, 21.3 seconds at the preliminary meeting to the California state championships. The following week, he won the CIF California State Meet championships with a time of 4 minutes and 27.8 seconds. That record helped him win a scholarship to the University of Southern California.

In 1936, Zamperini decided to try out for the Olympics. In those days, athletes had to pay their way to the Olympic trials, but since his father worked for the railroad, Louis could get a train ticket free of charge. A group of Torrance merchants raised enough money for the local hero to live on once he got there. The competition for the 1,500 meters spot was fierce that year, with eventual silver medalist Glenn Cunningham, Archie San Romani, and Gene Venzke all challenging to get on the team.

Zamperini did not compete in the 1,500 meters; instead, he ran the 5,000 meters. On one of the hottest days of the year during the 1936 North American heat wave in Randalls Island, New York, the race saw co-favorite Norm Bright and several others collapse during the race. It was reported that 40 people died from the heat in Manhattan alone that week. With a sprint finish at the end, Zamperini finished in a dead-heat tie against American record-holder Don Lash and qualified for the 1936 Summer Olympics in Berlin, Germany. Having qualified at age 19 years, 178 days, he remains the youngest American 5,000 meters qualifier.

=== Olympics ===
Neither Zamperini nor Lash was believed to have much chance of winning the 1936 Olympics 5,000-meter race against world record holder Lauri Lehtinen. Zamperini later related several anecdotes from his Olympic experience, including gorging himself on the boat trip to Europe: "I was a Depression-era kid who had never even been to a drugstore for a sandwich in his life," he said, "and all the food was free. I had not just one sweet roll, but about seven every morning, with bacon and eggs. My eyes were like saucers." By the end of the trip, Louis Zamperini, in common with most athletes on the ship, had gained a good deal of weight: in Zamperini's case, 12 pounds (5 kg). While the weight gain was not advantageous for his running, it was necessary for his health, as he had lost 15 pounds (7 kg) while training in the summer heat in New York for the Olympic Trials.

Zamperini finished 8th in the 5,000-meter distance event at that Olympics, in the time of 14 minutes 46.8 seconds, behind Finland's Gunnar Hockert's Olympic record time of 14 minutes 22.2 seconds (world record holder Lehtinen was second, and Zamperini's teammate, Lash, 13th). However, his final lap of 56 seconds was fast enough to catch the attention of Adolf Hitler, who afterwards had Zamperini come to his stand, where as Zamperini told the story, Hitler shook his hand, and said, "Ah, you're the boy with the fast finish."

=== Collegiate career ===
After the Olympics, Zamperini enrolled as a student at the University of Southern California. At USC, he was a member of Kappa Sigma fraternity (Delta-Eta Chapter). In 1938, Zamperini set a national collegiate mile (1,609 meters) record of 4 minutes 8.3 seconds, despite severe cuts to his shins from competitors attempting to spike him during the race; this record lasted for fifteen years, earning him the nickname "Torrance Tornado."

== World War II service ==
Japanese-occupied Nauru Island under attack by Liberator bombers of the Seventh Air Corps, April 1943.

After graduating from USC in 1940, Zamperini enlisted in the United States Army Air Forces as an aviation cadet in September 1941 and earned a commission as a second lieutenant. He was posted to the Pacific island of Funafuti as a bombardier on the Consolidated B-24 Liberator bomber Super Man.

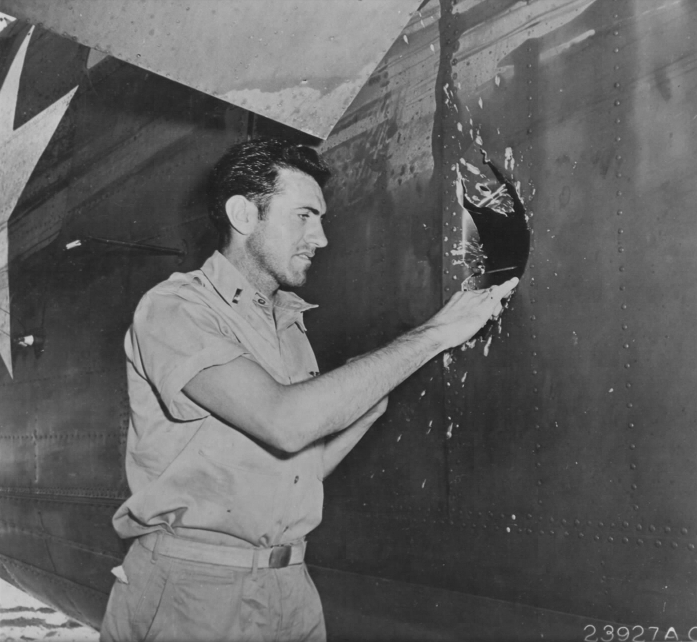
Zamperini examines a hole in his B-24D Liberator Super Man made by a 20 mm shell over Nauru.

In April 1943, Super Man participated in a bombing mission against the Japanese-held island of Nauru, with Zamperini serving as bombardier. Following the successful raid, his craft was attacked by three Japanese Zeros and the bomber was severely damaged. Five of the crew were wounded, one of whom died. The May 4 New York Times credited Zamperini with administering first aid to the five wounded members of his Liberator bomber crew and saving the lives of two on the return flight from the April 21 Nauru raid. "Ground crewmen counted 594 bullet and shell fragment holes in the fuselage and tail structure of the big four-engine bomber after it had skidded to a stop with a flat tire."

=== Lost during search mission ===
With Super Man no longer airworthy, the healthy crew members were transferred to Hawaii for reassignment. Zamperini, along with some other former Super Man crewmates, was assigned to conduct a search for a lost aircraft and crew. They were given another B-24, Green Hornet, notorious among the pilots as a defective "lemon." (Aircraft records show several B-24s with the name: "Green Hornet" and "The Green Hornet"; in this case the name was verified from Zamperini's diary before the mission.) In May 1943, before his last mission, Louis ran a mile in under 4 minutes, 12 seconds. This is an immense achievement, considering he was running in sand.

On May 27, 1943, while on the search, mechanical difficulties caused the bomber to crash into the ocean 850 miles (1,370 km) south of Oahu, killing eight of the 11 men aboard.

The three survivors were Zamperini, pilot Russell Allen Phillips and Francis Pershing McNamara; with their emergency rations having all been eaten by McNamara on their first night, they subsisted on rainwater, small fish eaten raw, and birds that landed on their raft. McNamara used an oar to defend the survivors from a shark attack. They attempted to gain the attention of a search plane, but failed. With the few tools they were able to salvage from the crash, the men were able to manage on two small rafts that got released. They caught two albatrosses, one of which they ate, and used pieces as bait to catch fish, all while fending off constant shark attacks and nearly being capsized by a storm. They were strafed a number of times by a Japanese bomber, which punctured their life raft, but no one was hit. After 33 days at sea, McNamara died; Zamperini and Phillips wrapped up his body and pushed it overboard.

=== Prisoner of war ===
On their 47th day adrift, with little food or water, Zamperini and Phillips reached the Marshall Islands and were immediately taken prisoner by the Japanese Navy. They were held in captivity, severely beaten, and mistreated until the end of the war in August 1945. Initially held at Kwajalein Atoll, after 42 days they were transferred to the Japanese prisoner-of-war camp at Ōfuna, for captives who were not registered as prisoners of war (POWs). After slightly over a year in Ofuna, Zamperini was transferred to Tokyo's Ōmori POW camp, and was eventually transferred to the Naoetsu POW camp in northern Japan, where he remained until the war ended. While at Omori and Naoetsu, he was tormented by prison guard Mutsuhiro "The Bird" Watanabe, who was later included in General Douglas MacArthur's list of the forty most wanted war criminals in Japan.

Zamperini was held at the same camp as then-Major Greg "Pappy" Boyington, and in his book, Baa Baa Black Sheep, Boyington describes the Italian recipes Zamperini wrote to keep the prisoners' minds off the food and conditions.

== Post-war life ==
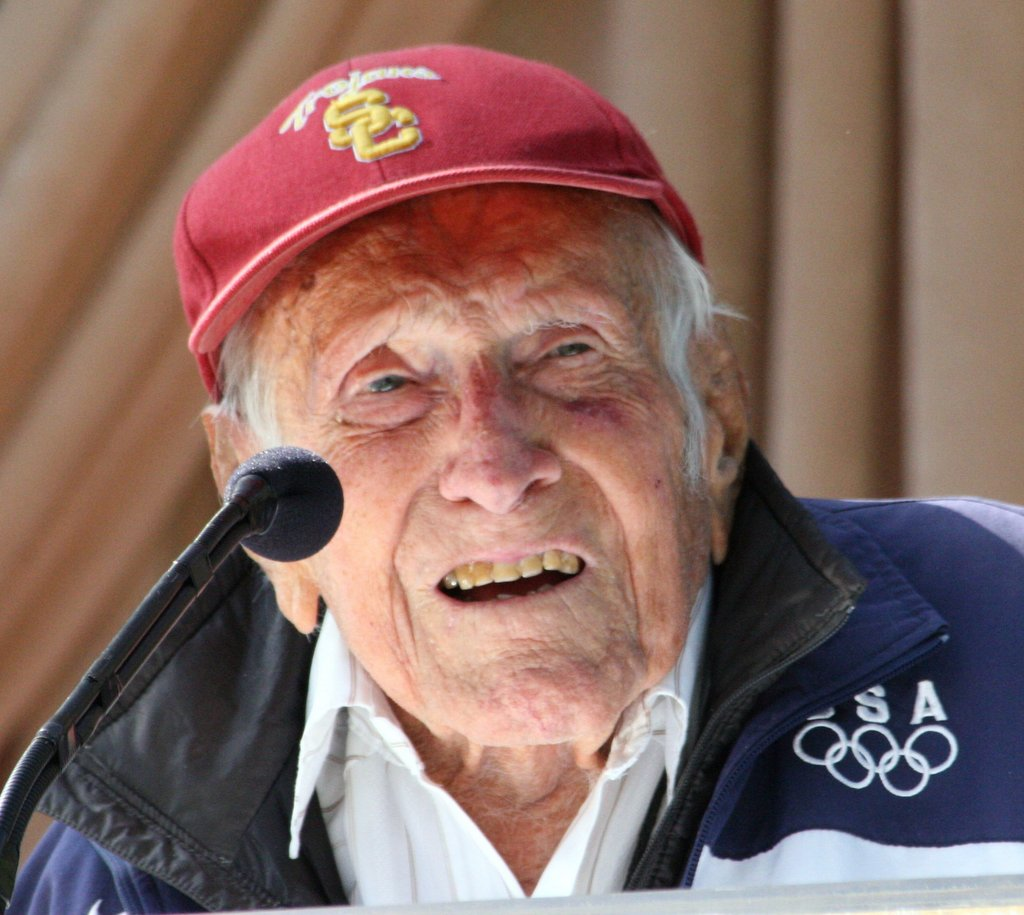
Zamperini at the announcement of 2014 Tournament of Roses Grand Marshal

Never being registered as a prisoner of war, Zamperini had at first been declared missing in action, then, a year and a day after the date of his disappearance, his status was changed to killed in action. When he eventually returned home, he received a hero's welcome.

Zamperini married Cynthia Applewhite in 1946. Zamperini struggled with post-traumatic stress disorder after returning home, on one occasion unintentionally strangling a pregnant Applewhite. Zamperini also became addicted to alcohol, which caused Applewhite to seek a divorce; however, after attending one of Billy Graham's Los Angeles Crusades, she became a Christian and told Zamperini she no longer wanted a divorce. They remained married until her death in 2001. They had two children, Luke Zamperini and Cynthia Garris. Luke Zamperini went on the marry Lisa Zamperini and have a kid of his own, Clay Zamperini. Cynthia Garris, also known as Cissy, went on to marry Mick Garris.

=== Evangelism ===
In a televised interview on the Christian Broadcasting Network in 2003, Zamperini related that after the war, he had nightmares about strangling his former captors and began drinking heavily, trying to forget his experiences as a POW. His wife Cynthia attended one of the evangelistic crusades led by Billy Graham in Los Angeles, and became a born-again Christian. In 1949, at the encouragement of his wife and her Christian friends, Zamperini reluctantly agreed to attend a crusade. Graham's preaching reminded him of his prayers during his time on the life raft and imprisonment, and Zamperini committed his life to Christ. Following this, he forgave his captors, and his nightmares ceased.

Later Graham helped Zamperini launch a new career as a Christian evangelist. One of his recurring themes was forgiveness, and he visited many of the guards from his POW days to let them know that he had forgiven them. This included an October 1950 visit to Sugama Prison in Tokyo, where many war criminals were imprisoned, and expressed forgiveness to them. Zamperini told CBN that some became Christians in response.

=== Last years ===
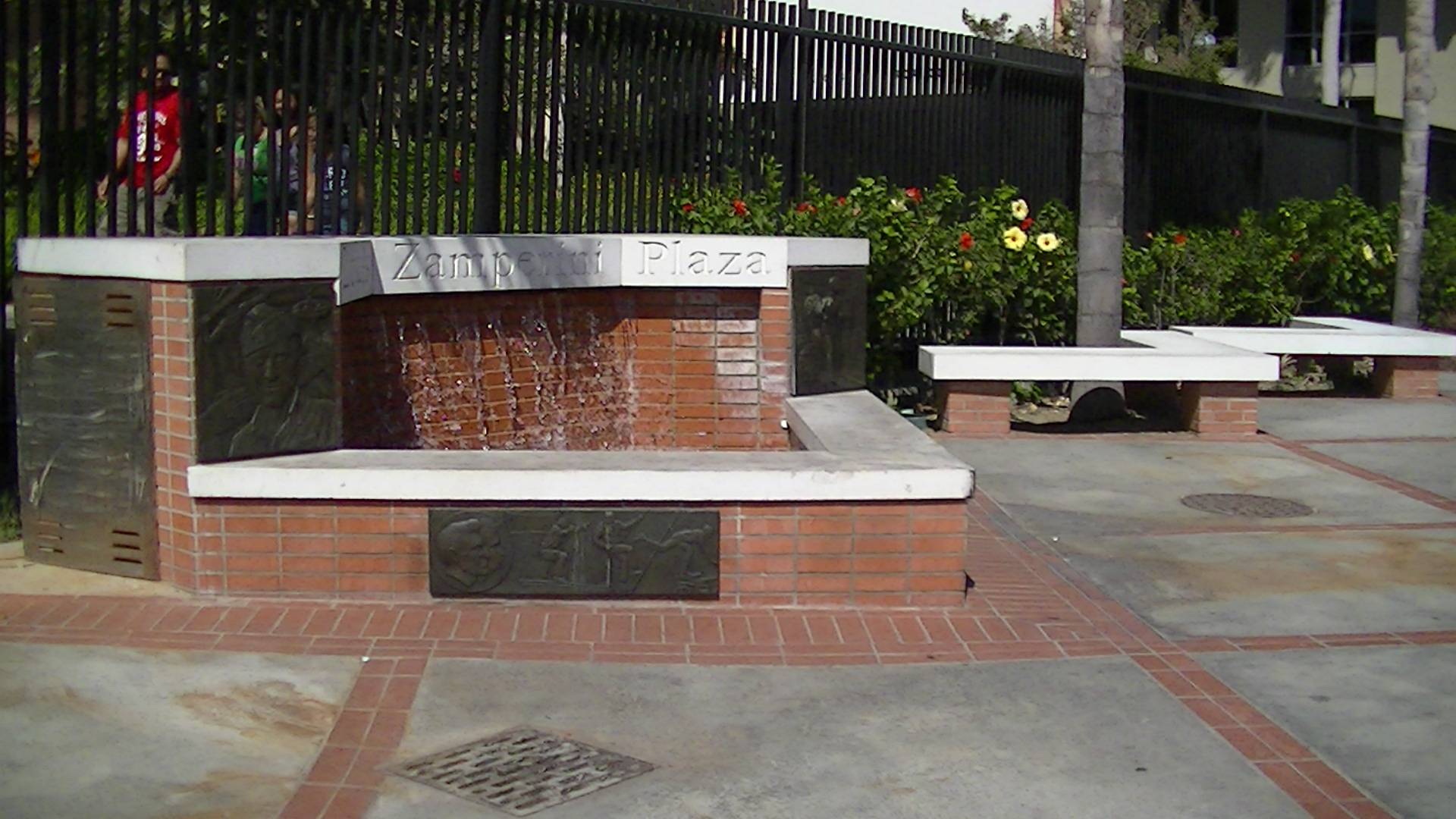
Louis Zamperini Plaza on the campus of the University of Southern California

In January 1998, an 80-year-old Zamperini ran a leg in the Olympic Torch relay for the Winter Olympics in Nagano, Japan, not far from the POW camp where he had been held. While there, he attempted to meet with his chief and most brutal tormentor during the war, Mutsuhiro Watanabe, also known as "the Bird", who had evaded prosecution as a war criminal. Watanabe, however, refused to see him. Nevertheless, Zamperini sent him a letter, stating that while he suffered great mistreatment from him, he had forgiven him. It is unknown whether Watanabe even read the letter; Zamperini never received any response, and Watanabe died in 2003. In March 2005, Zamperini returned to Germany to visit the Berlin Olympic Stadium for the first time since he had competed there.

In his 90s, Zamperini continued to attend USC football games, and he befriended star quarterback Matt Barkley in 2009.

Zamperini appeared on The Tonight Show with Jay Leno on June 7, 2012, speaking about his life in general, the 1936 Olympics, and his World War II exploits.

=== Death ===
During his World War II service, Zamperini's death had mistakenly been announced when the US government classified him as killed in action. President Franklin D. Roosevelt even sent Zamperini's parents a formal condolence note in 1944. It was not until the end of World War II in late 1945 that Zamperini was discovered to still be alive and freed from his captors.

Zamperini's actual death came 70 years later, when he died of pneumonia on July 2, 2014, at his home in Los Angeles; he was 97.

== Media ==
=== Biographies and memoirs ===
Zamperini wrote two memoirs about his experiences, both bearing the same title, Devil at My Heels, but with different co-authors and content.

Author Laura Hillenbrand wrote a biography of Zamperini entitled Unbroken: A World War II Story of Survival, Resilience, and Redemption (2010) and published by Random House, was a #1 New York Times bestseller. It was named the top nonfiction book of 2010 by Time Magazine.

=== Film ===
The book Unbroken: A World War II Story of Survival, Resilience, and Redemption was twice adapted into film. First, Unbroken, written by the Coen brothers and two others, was directed by Angelina Jolie and starred Jack O'Connell as Zamperini. It covered the time up to Zamperini's return from the war. Later, a sequel, Unbroken: Path to Redemption, covers Zamperini's recovery from his abuse as a POW, and was directed by Harold Cronk, and was released in September 2018, with Samuel Hunt portraying Zamperini.

In 2015, the Billy Graham organization released a 30-minute documentary film, Captured by Grace. The film focused on Zamperini's faith, to which he credited his "unbroken" status.

=== In popular culture ===
Zamperini features as a character in the 2012 novel Flight from Berlin by David John, published by Harper Collins.

=== In sports ===
Zamperini is an Irish horse named after Louis trained by G. L Moore.

== Legacy and awards ==
- USAAF Decorations

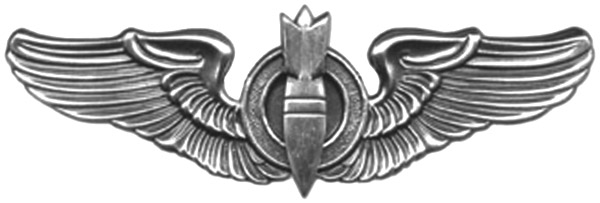

Presidential Unit Citation
Presidential Unit Citation	Bombardier Badge		
Presidential Unit Citation	Distinguished Flying Cross		Purple Heart with one oak leaf cluster
Presidential Unit Citation	Air Medal with three oak leaf clusters	Prisoner of War Medal	American Defense Service Medal
Presidential Unit Citation	Asiatic-Pacific Campaign Medal with three service stars	World War II Victory Medal	Philippine Liberation Medal with one service star

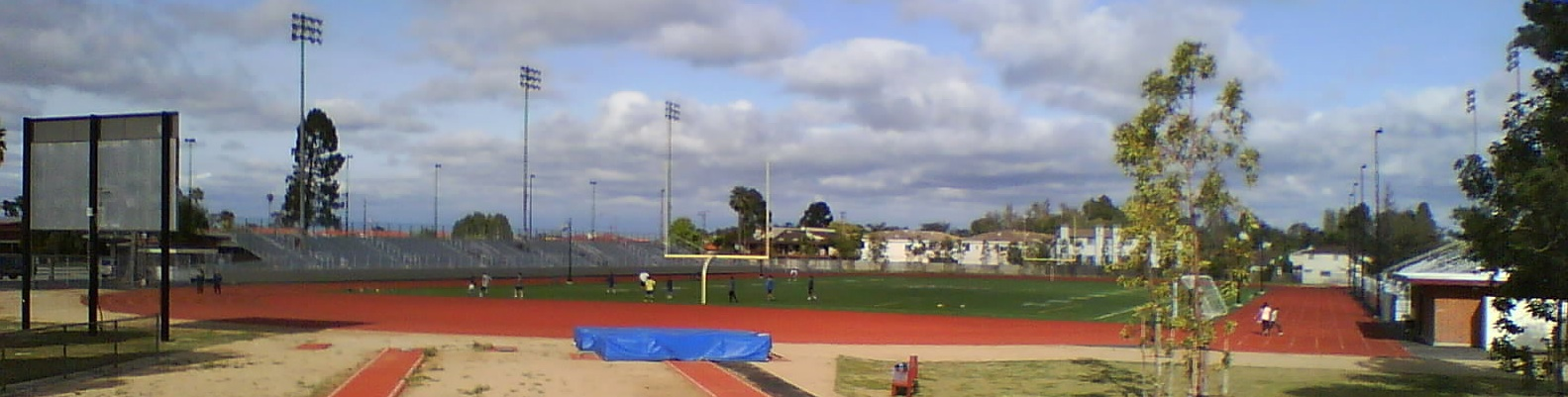
Zamperini Stadium at Torrance High School

- A race at Madison Square Garden was named the Louis Zamperini Invitational Mile.
- On December 7, 1946, Torrance Airport was named Zamperini Field after him.
- Zamperini was a torchbearer for the 1984 Summer Olympic Games in Los Angeles and the 1998 Winter Games in Nagano.
- Torrance High School's home football, soccer, and track stadium was named Zamperini Stadium, and the entrance plaza at USC's track & field stadium was named Louis Zamperini Plaza in 2004.
- On May 10, 2008, Zamperini was awarded the Ellis Island Medal of Honor by the National Ethnic Coalition of Organizations.
- In October 2008, Zamperini was inducted into the National Italian American Sports Hall of Fame in Chicago, Illinois.
- On April 24, 2011, Zamperini received an honorary degree, Doctor of Humane Letters from Azusa Pacific University.
- On May 20, 2011, Zamperini delivered Bryant University's 2011 baccalaureate address and received Bryant's inaugural Distinguished Character Award.
- On May 21, 2011, Bryant University presented Zamperini with an honorary degree, Doctor of Humane Letters.
- On May 22, 2011, Zamperini threw out the ceremonial first pitch before the Red Sox-Cubs game at Fenway Park in Boston.
- In late July 2011, Zamperini received the Kappa Sigma Golden Heart Award during the Kappa Sigma 68th Biennial Grand Conclave held at the Flamingo Casino in Las Vegas, Nevada.
- In May 2011, Zamperini was guest of honor at Magellan Christian Academy's graduation ceremony with over 700 attendees at the University of North Florida in Jacksonville, Florida. Lorrie Blitch, owner of Magellan Christian Academy, was so moved after reading about his life, he was asked to speak at their private Christian school graduation ceremony. Zamperini's presentation was so inspirational that he received a 10-minute standing ovation.
- He was chosen to serve as Grand Marshal of the 2015 Rose Parade, held before the college football playoff game in his home state of California. After Zamperini's death on July 2, 2014, the Tournament announced that it is "committed to honoring him as the Grand Marshal of the 2015 Rose Parade". At the parade, Zamperini's family followed USC mascot Traveler as a riderless horse.
- On January 16, 2013, The USAG-KA (Kwajalein Atoll) Dining Facility was renamed The Captain Louis S. Zamperini Dining Facility in honor of Louis Zamperini.
- In August 2014, his hometown of Olean, New York dedicated a monument to Zamperini. It sits at War Veterans Park. Louis was born in Olean before moving to Los Angeles, CA.
- In the fall of 2015, Zamperini was named as the class exemplar for the United States Air Force Academy Class of 2018 for his character and courage in service to his country in the United States Army Air Force.
- In 2017, a 2-mile stretch of the 405 Freeway between Redondo Beach Boulevard and Western Avenue (border to border the portion within the city of Torrance) was named the Louis Zamperini Memorial Highway.

== See also ==
- Jacob DeShazer
- Four-minute mile
- List of people who disappeared mysteriously at sea

== Bibliography ==
- Hillenbrand, Laura (2010). Unbroken: A World War II story of survival, resilience, and redemption. New York, NY: Random House. ISBN 978-0-81297-449-2.
- Hilton, Christopher (2011). Hitler's Olympics: The 1936 Berlin Olympic Games. Troud, Gloucestershire, UK: The History Press. ISBN 978-0-75247-538-7.
- Lobb, Charles (2006). Torrance Airport. Charleston, South Carolina: Arcadia Publishing. ISBN 978-0-7385-4662-9.
- Zamperini, Louis; Itria, Helen (1956). Devil at My Heels: The story of Louis Zamperini. E.P. Dutton and Company. ASIN B0018KCZFE.
- Zamperini, Louis; Rensin, David (2003). Devil at My Heels: A World War II hero's epic saga of torment, survival, and forgiveness. New York, NY: Harper Collins Publishers. ISBN 978-0-06211-885-1.
- Zamperini, Louis; Rensin, David (2014). Don't Give Up, Don't Give In: Lessons from an extraordinary life. New York, NY: Dey Street Books. ISBN 978-0-06236-833-1.
