= Ōfuna prisoner-of-war camp =

World War II Japanese Navy installation

Coordinates: 35°21′4.31″N 139°31′6.35″E

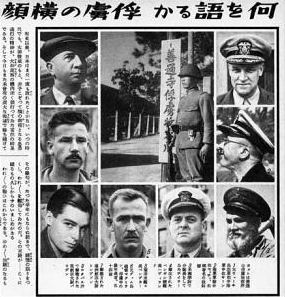
An example of Japanese P.O.W. propaganda, featuring prominent POWs held by the Japanese government. Clockwise and starting upper right: Commander Campbell Keene, American Commander of Naval Air Station, Wake Island; US Navy doctor Thatcher, a famous optician of the time; Sergeant Taylor, an American platoon leader; Captain Haviland, American Captain of the USS Penguin; Vendekar, Dutch Submarine Captain; Major Bowden, English pilot; Thompson, Australian pilot; and George J. McMillin, Governor of Guam.

The Ōfuna Camp (大船収容所, Ōfuna shūyōsho) was an Imperial Japanese Navy installation located in Kamakura, outside Yokohama, Japan during World War II, where high-value enlisted and officers, particularly pilots and submariner prisoners of war were incarcerated and interrogated by Japanese naval intelligence. Richard O'Kane, Louis Zamperini and Gregory Boyington were among the prisoners held at Ōfuna.

== Background ==
The Ōfuna Camp was opened on April 26, 1942, and was operated by a detachment of the Guard Unit of the Yokosuka Naval District. Whereas most other Japanese P.O.W. camps were run by the Imperial Japanese Army, Ōfuna was run by the Navy. In violation of international agreements, including the Geneva Convention, it was never officially reported as a prisoner camp, and the International Red Cross was not allowed access. The Japanese position was that the Ōfuna Camp was only a temporary holding facility for prisoners, who would be transferred elsewhere. It was commanded by Commander Yokura Sashizo, who was later sentenced to 25 years of hard labor for war crimes.

== Description ==
The Ōfuna Camp consisted of three interconnected one-story buildings surrounding a large field, surrounded by an eight-foot-high wooden fence. The area had formerly been an elementary school. The buildings were of unpainted wood roofed with tar paper, and had a long central corridor with thirty rooms to a side, each about six by nine feet (1.83 by 2.74 meters), a single electric light, bunk, bamboo mat, and door with a small window. One of the cells was a dispensary. The camp contained two latrines and one shower room, along with a barracks for the guards, kitchen, and rooms for the Japanese commandant, non-commissioned officers and orderly.

== Policy ==
Among the prisoners held at Ōfuna were the surviving crews of the USS Tang (SS-306), USS Perch (SS-176) and the USS Sculpin (SS-191), along with a number of American and British aviators.

Prisoners were housed in individual cells, and were allowed to talk to no one, not even to themselves in their sleep. In good weather, they were allowed to sit outside their cells, looking straight forward, and the rule of silence was strictly enforced. Meals consisted of a little rice and soup. The prisoners were given no blankets, and the only clothing was the clothing that they had been captured in. The normal stay at Ōfuna was limited to eight days, although some prisoners were held much longer. Some were held at Ōfuna for several months. Three crew members of the USS Perch (SS-176) remained at Ōfuna for the duration of the war and were used to intercept Allied radio traffic.

Ōfuna had a reputation for intimidation and for torturing their inmates in an attempt to get military information, and was nicknamed the "Torture Farm" by its inmates. As the prisoners sent to Ōfuna were primarily officers, who might have inside knowledge of Allied strategy, or others working in critical areas such as communications and submarines, it was the goal of the Japanese to extract as much information as possible in a short time. The names of the prisoners held at Ōfuna were not divulged to the Red Cross, and the camp was so secret that even local inhabitants were not aware of its existence.

As relayed to a submarine prisoner: "You have survived the sinking of a submarine. No one survives the sinking of a submarine. No one knows you're alive. We're going to ask you questions. This man and this man are going to shoot you if you don't answer the questions, and no one will know you were alive." In some cases, the inmates were told by their captors that they were regarded as war criminals, since 90 percent of the crews of the merchant vessels sunk by American submarines were civilians, and that as war criminals, they would be given only half the rations of normal prisoners of war.

The interrogations were repeated every two weeks, and the interrogators compared notes to see if there were any discrepancies. Refusing to answer questions, lying, disrespect to the interrogators, and a number of other infractions were punished by a beating with wooden clubs. Guards often beat prisoners or slapped them in the face for the slightest infraction or at times at random. Officers typically faced harsher treatment than enlisted ranks. Inmates also claimed that Ōfuna guards were often sadistic, enjoying the beating and clubbing of inmates.

Inmates claimed that their scarce food rations were due to their Japanese and Red Cross rations being sold on the black market outside of camp. The inmates were forced to exercise every day. An inmate recalls, "We were dying, on about 500 calories a day". In 1948, the camp's notorious medical orderly, Sueharu Kitamura, was tried for causing the death of one prisoner and contributing to the deaths of three others; originally sentenced to hang, he later had his sentence reduced to thirty years of hard labor.

Despite the physical and verbal abuse, of the estimated one thousand prisoners who passed through during the war, only six prisoners died while incarcerated at the Ōfuna Camp. The remaining 126 American and nine British prisoners were liberated on 21 August 1945. The buildings of Ōfuna Camp were used as a kindergarten until they were pulled down in 1969.
