= Jeremy Foley (athletic director) =

American football player and college athletics director

Current position
- Title: Athletic director emeritus
- Team: Florida
- Conference: SEC

Biographical details
- Born: December 1, 1952 (age 73); Washington, D.C., U.S.
- Education: Hobart College (B.A., 1974); Ohio University (MSA, 1976)

Playing career
- 1970–1973: Hobart football
- 1971–1974: Hobart lacrosse

Administrative career (AD unless noted)
- 1976–1977: Florida (Intern UAA ticket office)
- 1977–1979: Florida (ticket mngr.)
- 1979–1980: Florida (tickets & game operations)
- 1981–1986: Florida (assoc. AD)
- 1986–1987: Florida (interim AD)
- 1987–1992: Florida (senior assoc. AD)
- 1992–2016: Florida
- 2016–present: Florida (AD emeritus)

Accomplishments and honors

Awards
- SportsBusiness Journal AD of the Year (2006); John L. Toner Award (2007); Carl Maddox Sport Management Award (2009)

Jeremy N. Foley (born December 1, 1952) is an American university sports administrator and former college athlete. Foley was athletic director for the Florida Gators Division I sports program of the University of Florida located in Gainesville, Florida from 1992 to 2016, when he semi-retired and became an emeritus athletic director focusing on fundraising for the school. He also served as the chief financial officer of the University Athletic Association (UAA), the private non-profit corporation that is responsible for the administration and financial management of the Florida Gators sports program.

== Early life and education ==
Foley was born in Washington, D.C. in 1952, and raised in New London, New Hampshire. He graduated from the Holderness School in New Hampshire in 1970. He attended Hobart College in Geneva, New York, where he played football and lacrosse, and was a member of Kappa Sigma fraternity (Delta Phi chapter); he graduated with a Bachelor of Arts degree in psychology in 1974. In 1976, he completed a master's degree in sports administration from Ohio University in Athens, Ohio. He is the older brother of Navy Cross recipient and Gulf War hero Lt. Col. James Lucian Foley USMC(Ret.) of Derry, NH.

== Early career ==
Foley started his career at the University of Florida as an intern in the UAA ticket office in August 1976. When his internship ended, Foley was hired as a full-time employee and was soon promoted to ticket manager. Two years later he was named director of ticket and game operations. After just one additional year, he became an assistant athletic director and spent the next twelve years learning every facet of Gators athletics. From 1981 to 1986, Foley was the associate athletic director for business affairs.

Bill Carr was appointed Florida's athletic director in 1979 at age 33, younger than all of the then-current head sports coaches at Florida. When Carr left in 1986, Jeremy Foley was named the interim athletic director. The athletic director search committee selected Bill Arnsparger in 1987, Arnsparger had no experience as an athletic director. Foley was disappointed not to have been selected, but accepted the position of senior associate athletic director. Arnsparger resigned in 1992, and at age 39, Foley was named the Florida athletic director.

== Later career ==
Foley served as UF's athletic director from 1992 until 2016, and was responsible for the hiring of several of Florida's most notable coaches, including Urban Meyer as the head football coach in 2004 and Billy Donovan as the men's basketball coach in 1996. The sports program finished as the top-ranked overall program in the Southeastern Conference (SEC) during all but one year under his tenure. On June 22, 2007, Foley and the UAA signed an eleven-year employment contract "worth up to $1.2 million annually with bonuses, making him the highest paid athletic director in the country and keeping him in Gainesville until retirement age." University of Florida President Bernie Machen said "Jeremy's contract is what you would expect for the best athletic director in the nation."

Jeremy Foley's tenure as Florida's athletic director was generally considered successful by Gator alumni and supporters. He is most notably credited for his hiring of Meyer and Donovan who have won national championships at Florida in the two most popular intercollegiate sports. Foley's successful hires also include Becky Burleigh (the first coach of the fledgling Florida Gators women's soccer program that won the 1998 national title) and, more recently, Tim Walton (whose Gators softball team won the program's first-ever national championship in 2014 and successfully defended its title in 2015).

Foley has also maintained successful and long-term relationships with coaches who were hired before he became athletic director, most notably men's golf coach Buddy Alexander and volleyball coach Mary Wise.

Though he demonstrates a fierce loyalty to coaches who bring success to Florida, Foley also proved willing to remove unsuccessful coaches when he became convinced a change was necessary. Carolyn Peck, who led Purdue University to a women's basketball NCAA championship, was removed after her fifth season in Gainesville, and two-time College World Series coach Andy Lopez was fired after six seasons.

While Foley's firing of football coach Ron Zook midway through the 2004 season was unusual at the time, after the success of Urban Meyer's football teams, other universities have more commonly chosen to jettison football coaches mid-season in order to gain an advantage in the hiring process.

Foley personally attended many athletic competitions for all sports on campus and often traveled with Florida's various sports teams for significant events. In addition to the Gators' success on the playing field, the University of Florida's is one of the few athletic programs in the nation that not only supports itself financially, but makes regular seven-figure contributions to the general fund of its university.

One of Foley's responsibilities as the University of Florida's athletic director was to act as chief financial officer (CFO) for the University Athletic Association. In that capacity he oversaw over $180 million in capital improvements, including two major expansions of the football stadium, the addition of a multi-purpose field house on campus and new facilities for tennis, track & field, soccer, baseball, golf, softball and swimming. Jeremy Foley managed an annual budget of more than $89 million, but was particularly proud of the athletic program's academic success. "The national average for student-athlete graduation is around 76 percent," he said. "At UF, 92 percent of student-athletes graduate."

== Honors & awards ==
Foley is an ardent runner who has competed in the Boston Marathon.

In addition to being a member of the UAA board of directors, Foley also serves on the board of directors for Gator Boosters, Inc.

In 1995, Foley was the recipient of the Distinguished Alumnus Award from the Sports Administration and Facility Management Department at Ohio University.

The UF Alumni Association Board of Directors named Foley an Honorary Alumnus in October 2000.

From 1997 to 2002, Foley served on the NCAA Division I Management Council, the most powerful group (below the board of directors) within the NCAA.

In June 2006, Street & Smith named Foley as its SportsBusiness Journal National Athletics Director of the Year.

The National Football Foundation awarded Foley the John L. Toner Award in 2007, recognizing him as its national athletic director of the year.

Foley's alma mater, the Holderness School, a small, private, college preparatory school near Plymouth, New Hampshire presented him with its 2007 Distinguished Alumni Award on November 28, 2007.

On April 25, 2008, the Hobart College Alumni Association presented Foley with its Medal of Excellence, its highest honor, for outstanding achievements as the University of Florida athletic director, which has brought honor and distinction to his alma mater.

In 2009 the United States Sports Academy awarded Foley its Carl Maddox Sport Management Award in recognition of his contributions to the growth and development of sport enterprise through effective management practices.

== See also ==
- History of the University of Florida
- List of Hobart College alumni
- List of Kappa Sigma members
- University Athletic Association
