= List of Kappa Sigma grand conclaves =

Kappa Sigma is an international fraternity with currently over 400 active chapters and colonies in North America. There have been more than 245,000 initiates, of which more than 188,000 are living and more than 12,900 are undergraduates. This is a list of Kappa Sigma Grand Conclaves and Leadership Conferences.

Conclave number	Dates	Meeting type	Location	References
1st	July 5, 1876 – July 6, 1876	Grand Conclave	Eutaw House, Baltimore, Maryland	
2nd	October 29, 1878 – November 1, 1878	Grand Conclave	Exchange Hotel, Richmond, Virginia	
3rd	September 17, 1880 – September 18, 1880	Grand Conclave	The Town Hall, Abingdon, Virginia	
4th	December 21, 1883 – December 22, 1883	Grand Conclave	Lambda Chapter, Knoxville, Tennessee	
5th	Not called	Grand Conclave		
6th	June 22, 1885 – June 23, 1885	Grand Conclave	Lynch House, Lynchburg, Virginia	
7th	June 27, 1887 – June 28, 1887	Grand Conclave	Kappa Chapter, Nashville, Tennessee	
8th	November 14, 1888 – November 16, 1888	Grand Conclave	Atlanta Y.M.C.A., Atlanta, Georgia	
9th	December 31, 1890 - January 2, 1891	Grand Conclave	Carrollton Hotel, Baltimore, Maryland	
10th	October 12, 1892 – December 14, 1892	Grand Conclave	Ebbitt House, Washington, D.C.	
11th	October 10, 1894 – October 12, 1894	Grand Conclave	Richmond, Virginia	
12th	October 14, 1896 – October 16, 1896	Grand Conclave	Grand Hotel, Indianapolis, Indiana	
13th	December 28, 1898 – December 30, 1898	Grand Conclave	Chattanooga, Tennessee	
14th	November 28, 1900 – November 30, 1900	Grand Conclave	University of Pennsylvania, Philadelphia, Pennsylvania	
15th	November 26, 1902 – November 28, 1902	Grand Conclave	St. Charles Hotel, New Orleans, Louisiana	
16th	August 1904 – August 5, 1904	Grand Conclave	World's Fair Grounds, St. Louis, Missouri	
17th	July 25, 1906 – July 27, 1906	Grand Conclave	Lookout Mountain, Tennessee	
18th	July 1, 1908 – July 3, 1908	Grand Conclave	Denver, Colorado	
19th	July 13, 1910 – July 15, 1910	Grand Conclave	Waldorf-Astoria Hotel, New York City, New York	
20th	July 10, 1912 – July 12, 1912	Grand Conclave	Louisville, Kentucky	
21st	July 21, 1915 – July 23, 1915	Grand Conclave	Panama–Pacific International Exposition, San Francisco, California	
22nd		Grand Conclave	Atlanta, Georgia	(Note: Conclave wascheduledle for July but was canceled due to World War I.)
23rd	July 23, 1919 – July 25, 1919	Grand Conclave	Hotel Washington, Washington, D.C.	
24th	July 20, 1921 – July 22, 1921	Grand Conclave	Congress Hotel, Chicago, Illinois	
25th	June 28, 1923 – June 30, 1923	Grand Conclave	Hotel Ansley, Atlanta, Georgia	
26th	June 30, 1925 – July 2, 1925	Grand Conclave	The Broadmoor, Colorado Springs, Colorado	
27th	July 20, 1927 – July 23, 1927	Grand Conclave	Boston Park Plaza, Boston, Massachusetts	
28th	July 17, 1929 – July 20, 1929	Grand Conclave	The Ambassador Hotel, Los Angeles, California	
29th	June 30, 1931 – July 2, 1931	Grand Conclave	Bigwin Island, Lake of Bays, Ontario	
30th	July 19, 1933 – July 21, 1933	Grand Conclave	Hotel Loraine, Madison, Wisconsin	
31st	August 27, 1935 – August 31, 1935	Grand Conclave	John Mashall Hotel, Richmond, Virginia	
32nd	June 29, 1937 – July 2, 1937	Grand Conclave	Columbus, Ohio	
33rd	August 30, 1939 – September 7, 1939	Grand Conclave	Glacier National Park, Montana	
34th	August 27, 1941 – August 29, 1941	Grand Conclave	French Lick Springs Hotel French Lick, Indiana	
35th		Grand Conclave	Portand, Oregon	(Note: Conclave was scheduled but was canceled due to World War II.)
36th	August 30, 1947 – September 6, 1947	Grand Conclave	Edgewater Gulf Hotel, Biloxi, Mississippi	
37th	September 6, 1949 – September 10, 1949	Grand Conclave	The New Ocean House, Swampscott, Massachusetts	
38th	August 28, 1951 – August 31, 1951	Grand Conclave	Palmer House, Chicago, Illinois	
39th	August 24, 1953 – August 27, 1953	Grand Conclave	St. Louis, Missouri	
40th	August 28, 1955 – September 1, 1955	Grand Conclave	Lookout Mountain, Tennessee	
41st	August 27, 1957 – August 30, 1957	Grand Conclave	Miami, Florida	
42nd	August 23, 1959 – August 27, 1959	Grand Conclave	Brown Palace Hotel, Denver, Colorado	
43rd	August 21, 1961 – August 25, 1961	Grand Conclave	Portland, Oregon	
44th	August 26, 1963 – August 29, 1963	Grand Conclave	Muehlebach Hotel, Kansas City	
45th	August 18, 1965 – August 21, 1965	Grand Conclave	Shamrock Hotel, Houston, Texas	
46th	August 30, 1967 – September 2, 1967	Grand Conclave	Marriott Motor Hotel, Atlanta, Georgia	
47th	August 18, 1969 – August 23, 1969	Grand Conclave	Hotel John Marshall, Richmond, Virginia	
48th	August 23, 1971 – August 28, 1971	Grand Conclave	The Ambassador Hotel, Los Angeles, California	
49th	August 19, 1973 – August 24, 1973	Grand Conclave	Royal Coach Inn, Dallas, Texas	
50th	August 10, 1975 – August 15, 1975	Grand Conclave	Diplomat Resort & Spa Hollywood, Hollywood Beach, Florida	
51st	August 9, 1977 – August 13, 1977	Grand Conclave	The Chase Park Plaza Hotel, St. Louis, Missouri	
52nd	August 15, 1979 – August 18, 1979	Grand Conclave	Del Webb TowneHouse Hotel, Phoenix, Arizona	
53rd	August 18, 1981 – August 21, 1981	Grand Conclave	Marriott Hotel, New Orleans, Louisiana	
54th	August 10, 1983 – August 13, 1983	Grand Conclave	Holiday Inn at World's Fair Park, Knoxville, Tennessee	
55th	July 24, 1985 – July 28, 1985	Grand Conclave	Peabody Hotel, Memphis, Tennessee	
56th	July 22, 1987 – July 26, 1987	Grand Conclave	Hyatt Regency Indianapolis, Indianapolis, Indiana	
57th	July 26, 1989 – July 30, 1989	Grand Conclave	Hyatt Regency Orlando, Orlando, Florida	
58th	July 24, 1991 – July 28, 1991	Grand Conclave	Colony Square Hotel, Atlanta, Georgia	
59th	July 28, 1993 – August 1, 1985	Grand Conclave	The Fairmont Hotel, Dallas, Texas	
60th	July 19, 1995 – July 23, 1995	Grand Conclave	Marriott Hotel, Richmond, Virginia	
61st	July 30, 1997 – August 3, 1997	Grand Conclave	The Roosevelt New Orleans, New Orleans, Louisiana	
62nd	August 4, 1999 – August 7, 1999	Grand Conclave	The Pointe Hilton Squaw Peak, Phoenix, Arizona	
63rd	July 25, 2001 – July 29, 2001	Grand Conclave	Peabody Hotel, Memphis, Tennessee	
64th	July 30, 2003 – August 3, 2003	Grand Conclave	Tampa Marriott Waterside, Tampa, Florida	
	July 16, 2004 – July 17, 2004	Leadership Conference (East)	Cincinnati, Ohio	
	July 30, 2004 – July 31, 2004	Leadership Conference (West)	Denver, Colorado	
65th	July 13, 2005 – July 17, 2005	Grand Conclave	Riviera, Las Vegas, Nevada	
	July 21, 2006 – July 23, 2006	Leadership Conference (East)	Cincinnati, Ohio	
	July 28, 2006 – July 30, 2006	Leadership Conference (West)	Salt Lake City, Utah	
66th	July 11, 2007 – July 15, 2007	Grand Conclave	Doral Golf Resort & Spa, Miami, Florida	
	July 18, 2008 – July 20, 2008	Leadership Conference (West)	Marriott Pyramid North, Albuquerque, New Mexico	
	July 25, 2008 – July 27, 2008	Leadership Conference (East)	Marriott Hotel, Richmond, Virginia	
67th	July 22, 2009 – July 26, 2009	Grand Conclave	Hyatt Regency San Antonio on the Riverwalk, San Antonio, Texas	
	July 9, 2010 – July 11, 2010	Leadership Conference (East)	New Orleans Marriott, New Orleans, Louisiana	
	July 16, 2010 – July 18, 2010	Leadership Conference (West)	Flamingo Las Vegas, Las Vegas, Nevada	
68th	July 27, 2011 – July 31, 2011	Grand Conclave	Flamingo Las Vegas, Las Vegas, Nevada	
	July 20, 2012 – July 22, 2012	Leadership Conference (West)	Flamingo Las Vegas, Las Vegas, Nevada	
	July 27, 2012 – July 29, 2012	Leadership Conference (East)	New Orleans Marriott, New Orleans, Louisiana	
69th	July 24, 2013 – July 28, 2013	Grand Conclave	Flamingo Las Vegas, Las Vegas, Nevada	
	July 18, 2014 – July 20, 2014	Leadership Conference (East)	New Orleans Marriott, New Orleans, Louisiana	
	August 1, 2014 – August 3, 2014	Leadership Conference (West)	Flamingo Las Vegas, Las Vegas, Nevada	
70th	July 22, 2015 – July 26, 2015	Grand Conclave	Flamingo Las Vegas, Las Vegas, Nevada	
	July 22, 2016 – July 24, 2016	Leadership Conference	Renaissance Orlando at SeaWorld Orlando, Orlando, Florida	
71st	July 12, 2017 – July 16, 2017	Grand Conclave	Planet Hollywood Resort & Casino, Las Vegas, Nevada	
	July 19, 2018 – July 22, 2018	Leadership Conference	New Orleans Marriot, New Orleans, Louisiana	
72nd	July 24, 2019 – July 27, 2019	Grand Conclave	Paramount Theatre & Kappa Sigma HQ, Charlottesville, Virginia	(Note: This was the fraternity's 150th Anniversary.)
	January 8, 2021 – January 10, 2021	Leadership Conference	Bally’s Las Vegas, Las Vegas, Nevada	
73rd	July 21, 2021 – January 25, 2021	Grand Conclave	Renaissance Nashville, Nashville, Tennessee	
	July 29, 2022 – July 31, 2022	Leadership Conference	Denver, Colorado	
74th	July 26, 2023 – July 30, 2023	Grand Conclave	Charlottesville, Virginia	
