= List of Kappa Sigma chapters =

This list contains the names and schools of all Kappa Sigma chapters and colonies. The fraternity was established at the University of Virginia in 1869.

== Undergraduate chapters ==
In the following list, active chapters are indicated in bold and inactive chapters and institutions are in italics.

Chapter	Charter date and range	Institution	City	State or province	Status	Ref.
Zeta	December 10, 1869 – September 10, 2024	University of Virginia	Charlottesville	Virginia	Inactive	(Note: The university terminated the fraternity for numerous hazing incidents.)
Eta Prime	February 28, 1873 – 1887; 1892–2002; 2011 – February 2013	Duke University	Durham	North Carolina	Inactive	(Note: The national fraternity suspended the chapter in 2013 for holding a racist party featuring racial stereotypes of Asians.)
**Mu**	December 31, 1873 – 1877; 1888–1900; 1904–1970; 1980–200x ?; 2012	Washington and Lee University	Lexington	Virginia	Active	
Xi Prime	January 3, 1874 – 1884	Virginia Military Institute	Lexington	Virginia	Inactive	(Note: Chapter closed when the college banned fraternities.)
**Nu Prime**	June 17, 1874 – 1889; 1971–2009; 2015	Virginia Tech	Blacksburg	Virginia	Active	(Note: Chapter is not formally recognized by college.)
**Omikron**	June 24, 1874 – 1895; 2018	Emory and Henry University	Emory	Virginia	Active	
**Alpha-Alpha**	November 28, 1874 – 1876; 1890–1902	University of Maryland, College Park	College Park	Maryland	Colony	(Note: Formed or revived as a colony in 2024.)
Alpha-Beta	1874–1876, 1891–2023	Mercer University	Macon	Georgia	Inactive	(Note: In 2023, the chapter was suspended for at least five years for physical hazing.)
**Kappa**	April 13, 1877 – 1880; 1885–2006; 2009	Vanderbilt University	Nashville	Tennessee	Active	
Psi Prime	February 3, 1880 – 1882	Bethel Academy	Warrenton	Virginia	Inactive	(Note: Bethel Academy closed in 1911.)
**Lambda**	May 11, 1880 – 2006; 2008	University of Tennessee	Knoxville	Tennessee	Active	
Gamma Prime	August 31, 1880 – 1884	Cumberland College	Cumberland	Virginia	Inactive	(Note: Cumberland College is closed. Baird's notes that this college was situated in Cumberland, Virginia. It is not the school in Lee County. Not to be confused with Cumberland University.)
Sigma Prime	September 1, 1880 – 1881	Virginia Episcopal School	Lynchburg	Virginia	Inactive	
Alpha-Chi	October 23, 1880 – 1882; 1896–1967; 1990–2005	Lake Forest College	Lake Forest	Illinois	Inactive	
Alpha-Iota	February 1882 – 1883; 1892–1898	U.S. Grant Memorial University	Chattanooga	Tennessee	Inactive	(Note: U.S. Grant Memorial University, Chattanooga is now the University of Tennessee at Chattanooga.)
**Phi**	April 12, 1882 – 1981; 1983	Rhodes College	Memphis	Tennessee	Active	
Omega	May 6, 1882 – 1970	Sewanee: The University of the South	Sewanee	Tennessee	Inactive	
Gamma-Phi	September 30, 1883 – 1887; 1918–200x ?; 2008 – October 2014	West Virginia University	Morgantown	West Virginia	Inactive	(Note: The national fraternity withdrew the chapter's charter in October 2014 for violations of the fraternity's code of conduct. While operating illegally in November 2014, Kappa Sigma pledge Nolan Burch died after being forced to consume a large amount of alcohol in a hazing incident.)
**Upsilon**	November 14, 1883	Hampden–Sydney College	Hampden Sydney	Virginia	Active	
**Tau**	September 18, 1884	University of Texas at Austin	Austin	Texas	Active	
**Rho Prime**	February 11, 1885 – 1891; 1994	University of North Georgia	Dahlonega	Georgia	Active	
Chi	March 15, 1885 – 199x ?; 2000 – April 13, 2026	Purdue University	West Lafayette	Indiana	Inactive	
**Epsilon**	August 29, 1885 – 1904; 2000	Centenary College of Louisiana	Shreveport	Louisiana	Active	
Delta Prime	October 19, 1885 – 1887	Maryland Military and Naval Academy	Oxford	Maryland	Inactive	(Note: This short-lived school was in operation between 1885 and 1888. The chapter became inactive because of the school's closure.)
**Psi second**	January 1, 1886 – 1979; 1981	University of Maine	Orono	Maine	Active	
Sigma second	May 8, 1886 – 1888	Ohio Northern University	Ada	Ohio	Inactive	
**Iota**	October 15, 1886	Southwestern University	Georgetown	Texas	Active	
**Gamma second**	February 24, 1887	Louisiana State University	Baton Rouge	Louisiana	Active	
**Alpha**	March 26, 1887 – 1891; 1925–1935; 2006	Emory University	Atlanta	Georgia	Active	
**Beta-Theta**	May 14, 1887 – 1888; 1900–2018; 2023	Indiana University Bloomington	Bloomington	Indiana	Active	
**Theta Prime**	October 7, 1887 – 1917; 1993	Cumberland University	Lebanon	Tennessee	Active	
Beta Prime	February 27, 1888 – 1891	Thatcher Institute	Shreveport	Louisiana	Inactive	(Note: Chapter inactive because the school closed.)
Pi	July 21, 1888 – 1962	Swarthmore College	Swarthmore	Pennsylvania	Inactive	
Eta	November 14, 1888 – 1991; 1995 - 2024	Randolph–Macon College	Ashland	Virginia	Inactive	
**Sigma (third)**	January 26, 1889 – July 14, 2017; April 9, 2022	Tulane University	New Orleans	Louisiana	Active	(Note: The national fraternity closed the chapter in 2017 for three years for holding a party with alcohol, while under strictures for hazing and alcohol violations.)
Nu	March 1, 1890 – 200x ?; 2006 – May 13, 2024	College of William & Mary	Williamsburg	Virginia	Inactive	(Note: The national fraternity and college closed the chapter in 2024 for hazing.)
**Chi-Omega**	April 24, 1890 – 1897; 1927 – December 2014; 2016	University of South Carolina	Columbia	South Carolina	Active	(Note: The national fraternity withdrew the chapter's charter in 2014 for alcohol abuse, and controlled-substance violations, and hazing by 81 members.)
**Xi second**	May 29, 1890	University of Arkansas	Fayetteville	Arkansas	Active	
**Delta**	November 17, 1890 – 1971, 1988–2006	Davidson College	Davidson	North Carolina	Active	
Beta second, then Epsilon-Omicron	February 16, 1891 – 1894, 1949–1980	Butler University	Indianapolis	Indiana	Inactive	
**Alpha-Gamma**	December 12, 1891	University of Illinois Urbana–Champaign	Urbana and Champaign	Illinois	Active	
**Alpha-Delta**	January 8, 1892 – 2006; 2009–2020; 2026	Pennsylvania State University	University Park	Pennsylvania	Active	
**Alpha-Epsilon**	January 20, 1892 – 1981; 1987	University of Pennsylvania	Philadelphia	Pennsylvania	Active	
**Alpha-Zeta**	February 23, 1892 – 1899; 1902–2019; 2024	University of Michigan	Ann Arbor	Michigan	Active	
**Alpha-Eta**	February 23, 1892 – 1971; 1994	George Washington University	Washington	District of Columbia	Active	
Alpha-Theta	March 5, 1892 – 1908	Union University	Jackson	Tennessee	Inactive	
**Alpha-Kappa**	May 23, 1892 – 2010; 2013	Cornell University	Ithaca	New York	Active	
**Alpha-Lambda**	February 16, 1893 – 200x ?; 2007	University of Vermont	Burlington	Vermont	Active	
**Alpha-Mu**	June 3, 1893 – 1898; 1902	University of North Carolina at Chapel Hill	Chapel Hill	North Carolina	Active	
**Alpha-Nu**	January 27, 1894 – 1909; 1915	Wofford College	Spartanburg	South Carolina	Active	
Alpha-Xi	May 28, 1894 – 1902	Bethel College	Russellville	Kentucky	Inactive	(Note: Bethel College closed in 1964.)
Alpha-Omicron	September 7, 1894 – 1901	Transylvania University	Lexington	Kentucky	Inactive	
**Alpha-Pi**	February 1, 1895	Wabash College	Crawfordsville	Indiana	Active	
Alpha-Rho	February 22, 1895 – 1965	Bowdoin College	Brunswick	Maine	Inactive	
**Alpha-Sigma**	February 22, 1895 – 2000; 2004 – July 8, 2020	Ohio State University	Columbus	Ohio	Colony	(Note: The national fraternity closed the chapter in 2020 until 2024, after it was charged with hazing by the university. In January 2021, students were representing themselves as members of the chapter, illegally. The chapter was reformed as a colony on March 1, 2026.)
**Alpha-Tau**	October 5, 1895	Georgia Tech	Atlanta	Georgia	Active	
**Alpha-Upsilon**	November 9, 1895 – 200x ?; 2011	Millsaps College	Jackson	Mississippi	Active	
Alpha-Phi	December 11, 1896 – 200x ?; 2009–2017	Bucknell University	Lewisburg	Pennsylvania	Inactive	
**Alpha-Psi**	February 13, 1897 – 2002; 2009	University of Nebraska–Lincoln	Lincoln	Nebraska	Active	
Alpha-Omega	May 8, 1897 – 1936	William Jewell College	Liberty	Missouri	Inactive	
Beta-Alpha	February 22, 1898 – 1969; 1983–1990	Brown University	Providence	Rhode Island	Inactive	
Beta-Beta	March 5, 1898 – 2012; 2020–2025	University of Richmond	Richmond	Virginia	Inactive	
Beta-Delta	May 15, 1898 – 200x ?	Washington and Jefferson College	Washington	Pennsylvania	Inactive	
**Beta-Gamma**	April 16, 1898	University of Missouri	Columbia	Missouri	Active	
**Beta-Epsilon**	June 11, 1898 – 2018; 2024	University of Wisconsin–Madison	Madison	Wisconsin	Active	
**Beta-Zeta**	May 19, 1899 – 1981; 1983	Stanford University	Stanford	California	Active	
**Beta (third)**	June 3, 1867	University of Alabama	Tuscaloosa	Alabama	Active	
Beta-Eta	January 20, 1900 – 2018	Auburn University	Auburn	Alabama	Active	
Beta-Iota	November 28, 1900 – 2017	Lehigh University	Bethlehem	Pennsylvania	Inactive	
**Beta-Kappa**	February 2, 1900 – 1992; 2014	University of New Hampshire	Durham	New Hampshire	Active	(Note: Beta-Kappa chapter originally formed in 1881 as the Gamma chapter or "Granite chapter" of Q.T.V., an early Latin-named regional fraternity.)
**Beta-Lambda**	March 16, 1901 – 2010; 2015 - 2025	University of Georgia	Athens	Georgia	Inactive	
**Beta-Nu**	April 5, 1901	University of Kentucky	Lexington	Kentucky	Active	
**Beta-Mu**	April 6, 1901	University of Minnesota	Minneapolis	Minnesota	Active	
Beta-Xi	August 24, 1901 – 200x ?; 2013–2018	University of California, Berkeley	Berkeley	California	Inactive	
Beta-Pi	February 7, 1902 – 2004; 2008–2018	Dickinson College	Carlisle	Pennsylvania	Inactive	
Beta-Omicron	February 8, 1902 – 2017	University of Denver	Denver	Colorado	Inactive	
Beta-Rho	September 27, 1902 – 1934; 1969–2003; 2014–2019	University of Iowa	Iowa City	Iowa	Inactive	
Beta-Sigma	November 22, 1902 – 1934; 1948–19xx ?; 19xx ?–2025	Washington University in St. Louis	St. Louis	Missouri	Inactive	
**Beta-Tau**	February 2, 1903	Baker University	Baldwin City	Kansas	Active	
**Beta-Upsilon**	February 23, 1903 – 2020; 2025	North Carolina State University	Raleigh	North Carolina	Active	
Beta-Phi (first)	November 26, 1903 – 1934	Case Western Reserve University	Cleveland	Ohio	Inactive	
**Beta-Psi**	December 15, 1903	University of Washington	Seattle	Washington	Active	
**Beta-Chi**	December 19, 1903	Missouri University of Science and Technology	Rolla	Missouri	Active	
**Beta-Omega**	March 12, 1904	Colorado College	Colorado Springs	Colorado	Active	
**Gamma-Alpha**	April 16, 1904 – 2004; 2012	University of Oregon	Eugene	Oregon	Active	
Gamma-Beta	May 11, 1904 – 1947	University of Chicago	Chicago	Illinois	Inactive	
**Gamma-Gamma**	May 21, 1904	Colorado School of Mines	Golden	Colorado	Active	
**Gamma-Delta**	June 13, 1904 – 1980; 2014	University of Massachusetts Amherst	Amherst	Massachusetts	Active	
**Gamma-Zeta**	April 6, 1905 – 1974; 2013	New York University	New York City	New York	Active	
Gamma-Epsilon	April 11, 1905 – 1980	Dartmouth College	Hanover	New Hampshire	Inactive	
Gamma-Eta	June 24, 1905 – 1933; 2014–2017	Harvard University	Cambridge	Massachusetts	Withdrew	(Note: Chapter disaffiliated.)
**Gamma-Theta**	September 30, 1905	University of Idaho	Moscow	Idaho	Active	
Gamma-Iota	May 15, 1906 – 1975; 1987–200x ?	Syracuse University	Syracuse	New York	Inactive	
**Gamma-Kappa**	June 7, 1906 – 2009; 2013	University of Oklahoma	Norman	Oklahoma	Active	
**Gamma-Lambda**	January 21, 1901	Iowa State University	Ames	Iowa	Active	
Gamma-Mu	March 6, 1909 – 202x ?	Washington State University	Pullman	Washington	Inactive	
**Gamma-Nu**	March 6, 1909	Washburn University	Topeka	Kansas	Active	
**Gamma-Xi**	February 15, 1911 – 2004; 2007	Denison University	Granville	Ohio	Active	
**Gamma-Omicron**	May 18, 1912	University of Kansas	Lawrence	Kansas	Active	
**Gamma-Pi**	September 25, 1914	Massachusetts Institute of Technology	Cambridge	Massachusetts	Active	
**Gamma-Rho**	May 29, 1915 – 1973; 1980–2008; 2013–2018; 2023	University of Arizona	Tucson	Arizona	Active	
**Gamma-Sigma**	May 30, 1915	Oregon State University	Corvallis	Oregon	Active	
Gamma-Tau	June 2, 1916 – 2001; 2008–2025	University of Colorado Boulder	Boulder	Colorado	Inactive	
**Gamma-Upsilon**	April 29, 1918–2003; 2010–2018; 2023	Rutgers University–New Brunswick	New Brunswick	New Jersey	Active	
**Gamma-Chi**	June 7, 1919	Kansas State University	Manhattan	Kansas	Active	
Gamma-Psi	May 13, 1920 – 2025	Oklahoma State University	Stillwater	Oklahoma	Inactive	
Gamma-Omega	November 18, 1920 – 1941; 1967–1979; 1997–2016	University of Pittsburgh	Pittsburgh	Pennsylvania	Inactive	
Alpha-Alpha Prime	December 21, 1920 – 1941	Johns Hopkins University	Baltimore	Maryland	Inactive	
Delta-Alpha	April 12, 1921 – 2023	Carnegie Mellon University	Pittsburgh	Pennsylvania	Inactive	
Delta-Beta	May 5, 1921 – 1986	Lafayette College	Easton	Pennsylvania	Inactive	
Delta-Gamma	September 10, 1921 – 2002; 2018–2025	University of Wyoming	Laramie	Wyoming	Inactive	
**Delta-Delta**	April 28, 1922 – 1970; 199x ?	University of Florida	Gainesville	Florida	Active	
Delta-Epsilon	September 26, 1924 – 1987; 199x ?–2008	University of Toronto	Toronto	Ontario, Canada	Inactive	
**Delta-Zeta**	January 24, 1925 – 1967; 1981–2007; 2012–2016; 2019	University of New Mexico	Albuquerque	New Mexico	Active	
**Delta-Eta**	September 11, 1925 – 1959, 1963	University of Southern California	Los Angeles	California	Active	
Delta-Iota	March 19, 1926 – 1941	University of South Dakota	Vermillion	South Dakota	Inactive	
Delta-Kappa	May 14, 1926 – 1975	Ohio Wesleyan University	Delaware	Ohio	Inactive	
**Delta-Nu**	September 10, 1926 – 1964; 1978–1997; 200x ?	University of California, Los Angeles	Los Angeles	California	Active	
**Delta-Mu**	September 17, 1926	University of North Dakota	Grand Forks	North Dakota	Active	
**Delta-Lambda**	September 20, 1926	Montana State University	Bozeman	Montana	Active	
**Delta-Xi**	October 8, 1926 – 2006; 2008	University of Mississippi	Oxford	Mississippi	Active	
Delta-Omicron	May 13, 1927 – 1937; 2003–202x ?	University of Montana	Missoula	Montana	Inactive	
**Delta-Pi**	October 20, 1927	Southern Methodist University	Dallas	Texas	Active	
**Delta-Sigma**	May 16, 1928 – 200x ?; 2009	University of Utah	Salt Lake City	Utah	Active	
Delta-Rho	June 1, 1928 – 2021	Franklin & Marshall College	Lancaster	Pennsylvania	Colony	
Delta-Tau	March 22, 1929 – 1964; 1979–200x ?	Union College	Schenectady	New York	Inactive	
Delta-Upsilon	September 8, 1933 – 1964; 1986–200x ?	Occidental College	Los Angeles	California	Inactive	
**Delta-Phi**	March 2, 1935 – 19xx ?; 2002	Hobart and William Smith Colleges	Geneva	New York	Active	
**Delta-Chi**	March 6, 1936–2009; 2010	Mississippi State University	Starkville	Mississippi	Active	
**Delta-Psi**	November 15, 1937	Michigan State University	East Lansing	Michigan	Active	
**Delta-Omega**	December 9, 1937 – November 23, 2013; 2020	Wake Forest University	Winston-Salem	North Carolina	Active	(Note: The university banned the fraternity in 2014 for hazing.)
Epsilon-Alpha	May 1, 1939 – 2024	University of Alberta	Edmonton	Alberta, Canada	Inactive	
**Epsilon-Beta**	August 28, 1939 – 1973; 1986–2001; 2013–2020	University of Miami	Coral Gables	Florida	Colony	(Note: Formed or revived as a colony in 2025.) (Note: In 2001, the chapter was removed from campus after a pledge drowned while with two brothers.)
**Epsilon-Gamma**	April 7, 1941	Louisiana Tech University	Ruston	Louisiana	Active	
Epsilon-Delta	April 7, 1941 – 2003	Northwestern University	Evanston	Illinois	Inactive	
**Epsilon-Epsilon**	April 7, 1941	University of British Columbia	Vancouver	British Columbia, Canada	Active	
Epsilon-Zeta	April 7, 1942 – 1951; 1982–2017	University of Connecticut	Storrs	Connecticut	Inactive	(Note: In 2017, the chapter expelled following the death of a girl the prior October. Fraternity members were charged with serving alcohol to a minor.)
**Epsilon-Eta**	August 15, 1947 – 2013; 2017	Bowling Green State University	Bowling Green	Ohio	Active	
**Epsilon-Theta**	August 30, 1947 – 1970; 2006–2008; 2015	University of California, Santa Barbara	Santa Barbara	California	Active	
Epsilon-Iota	December 9, 1947 – 2002; 2004–2010; 2013 – December 19, 2022	San Diego State University	San Diego	California	Inactive	
Epsilon-Kappa	December 9, 1947 – 1964	Utah State University	Logan	Utah	Inactive	
Epsilon-Lambda	February 10, 1948 – 199x ?	University of Puget Sound	Tacoma	Washington	Inactive	
**Epsilon-Mu**	November 29, 1948	University of Tulsa	Tulsa	Oklahoma	Active	
**Epsilon-Nu**	December 11, 1948 – 2008; 2012	University of Southern Mississippi	Hattiesburg	Mississippi	Active	
**Epsilon-Xi**	September 12, 1949 – 20xx ?; 2024	University of Texas at El Paso	El Paso	Texas	Active	
**Epsilon-Pi**	May 28, 1950 – 20xx ?; 2017	University of Memphis	Memphis	Tennessee	Active	
**Epsilon-Rho**	June 5, 1950 – 1983; 2010	Kent State University	Kent	Ohio	Active	
Beta-Phi	March 20, 1951 – 1976; 1980–2006; 2013–2015	University of California, Davis	Davis	California	Inactive	
**Epsilon-Sigma**	June 2, 1951	Florida State University	Tallahassee	Florida	Active	
**Epsilon-Tau**	June 9, 1951 – 1970; 1981–200x ?; 2004	California State University, Fresno	Fresno	California	Active	
**Epsilon-Upsilon**	October 16, 1952 – 2015; 2019	University of North Texas	Denton	Texas	Active	
**Epsilon-Phi**	May 16, 1953 – 2016; 2020	Texas Tech University	Lubbock	Texas	Active	
**Theta**	February 19, 1955	Texas Christian University	Fort Worth	Texas	Active	
Epsilon-Chi	March 17, 1956 – 2017	University of Louisiana at Lafayette	Lafayette	Louisiana	Inactive	
Epsilon-Psi	May 30, 1958 – 2011	Lambuth University	Jackson	Tennessee	Inactive	(Note: Lambuth University closed in 2011.)
**Epsilon-Omega**	September 15, 1958 – 2016; 2019	Georgia State University	Atlanta	Georgia	Active	
Theta-Alpha	April 11, 1959 – 1969	Florida Southern College	Lakeland	Florida	Inactive	
**Theta-Beta**	May 9, 1959 – 2004; 2007	California State University, Long Beach	Long Beach	California	Active	
**Theta-Gamma**	November 21, 1959	Midwestern State University	Wichita Falls	Texas	Active	
**Theta-Delta**	February 18, 1961 – 2006; 2012	Willamette University	Salem	Oregon	Active	
**Theta-Epsilon**	February 19, 1961	Portland State University	Portland	Oregon	Active	
**Theta-Zeta**	November 16, 1962	Eastern New Mexico University	Portales	New Mexico	Active	
**Theta-Eta**	June 1, 1963 – 201x ?; 2016	University of Arkansas at Little Rock	Little Rock	Arkansas	Active	
Rho	December 14, 1963 – 2025	Arizona State University	Tempe	Arizona	Inactive	
**Theta-Theta**	February 5, 1965	Western Kentucky University	Bowling Green	Kentucky	Active	
**Theta-Iota**	April 24, 1965	San Jose State University	San Jose	California	Active	
Theta-Kappa	May 9, 1965 – 1992; 2013–2024	Texas A&M University–Kingsville	Kingsville	Texas	Inactive	
**Theta-Lambda**	February 12, 1966 – 1987; 1990	Texas State University	San Marcos	Texas	Active	
Theta-Mu	March 26, 1966 – 2023	Northwestern State University	Natchitoches	Louisiana	Inactive	
Gamma-Beta Prime	March 26, 1966 – 2002	Millikin University	Decatur	Illinois	Inactive	
**Theta-Nu**	May 28, 1966 – 200x ?; 2013	Ashland University	Ashland	Ohio	Active	
**Theta-Xi**	November 12, 1966	Trine University	Angola	Indiana	Active	
**Theta-Omicron**	November 19, 1966 – 200x ?; 2013	Muskingum University	New Concord	Ohio	Active	
**Theta-Pi**	November 20, 1966 – 2014; 2017	East Carolina University	Greenville	North Carolina	Active	
**Theta-Rho**	December 9, 1966	McNeese State University	Lake Charles	Louisiana	Active	
Theta-Sigma	February 11, 1967 – 1969	Spring Hill College	Mobile	Alabama	Inactive	
Theta-Tau	March 25, 1967 – 1969; 2017–20xx ?	California State University, Los Angeles	Los Angeles	California	Inactive	
**Theta-Upsilon**	April 1, 1967 – 2015; 2022	Miami University	Oxford	Ohio	Active	
Theta-Phi	April 29, 1967 – 20xx ?	Wichita State University	Wichita	Kansas	Inactive	
**Theta-Chi**	May 6, 1967 – 200x ?; 2006–2017; 2019	University of Louisiana at Monroe	Monroe	Louisiana	Active	
**Theta-Psi**	May 13, 1967	Oklahoma City University	Oklahoma City	Oklahoma	Active	
**Theta-Omega**	May 20, 1967 – 1995; 2013	University of Texas at Arlington	Arlington	Texas	Active	
Kappa-Alpha	June 2, 1967 – 2022	University of Nevada, Las Vegas	Paradise	Nevada	Withdrew	(Note: Chapter was under interim suspension pending the outcome of student conduct investigations on December 1, 2021. It voluntarily withdrew in 2022.)
Kappa-Beta	January 13, 1968 – 1984	Indiana State University	Terre Haute	Indiana	Inactive	
**Kappa-Gamma**	February 16, 1968 – 2013; 2019	Northern Arizona University	Flagstaff	Arizona	Active	
**Kappa-Delta**	March 23, 1968	University of South Florida	Tampa	Florida	Active	
**Kappa-Epsilon**	June 8, 1968 – 1988; 2006	University of Texas Rio Grande Valley	Edinburg	Texas	Active	
**Kappa-Zeta**	October 26, 1968	Georgia Southern University	Statesboro	Georgia	Active	
**Kappa-Eta**	November 16, 1968 – 200x ?; 2012	Widener University	Chester	Pennsylvania	Active	
**Kappa-Theta**	December 6, 1968 – 199x ?; 2007	Indiana University of Pennsylvania	Indiana	Pennsylvania	Active	
Kappa-Iota	March 8, 1969 – 2022	Middle Tennessee State University	Murfreesboro	Tennessee	Inactive	(Note: Kappa-Iota chapter was permanently expelled from Middle Tennessee State University.)
**Kappa-Kappa**	March 29, 1969	Georgia Southwestern State University	Americus	Georgia	Active	
**Kappa-Lambda**	April 26, 1969 –1999; 2005	Shippensburg University of Pennsylvania	Shippensburg	Pennsylvania	Active	
**Kappa-Mu**	May 2, 1969	Tennessee Technological University	Cookeville	Tennessee	Active	
Kappa-Nu	May 3, 1969 – 2022	University of South Alabama	Mobile	Alabama	Inactive	
Kappa-Xi	May 17, 1969 – 1978	University of Massachusetts Lowell	Lowell	Massachusetts	Inactive	
Kappa-Omicron	June 7, 1969 – 2007	LaGrange College	LaGrange	Georgia	Inactive	
**Kappa-Pi**	October 10, 1969 – 2016; 2025	University of Central Oklahoma	Edmond	Oklahoma	Active	
**Kappa-Rho**	December 5, 1969 – 2013; 2017	Boise State University	Boise	Idaho	Active	
Kappa-Tau	January 18, 1970 – 1978	Youngstown State University	Youngstown	Ohio	Inactive	
**Kappa-Upsilon**	March 6, 1970 – 2008; 2011	Clemson University	Clemson	South Carolina	Active	
**Kappa-Phi**	March 14, 1970 – xxxx ?; November 16, 2024	George Mason University	Fairfax	Virginia	Active	
**Kappa-Chi**	September 19, 1970 – 2002; 2005–2018; 2024	College of Charleston	Charleston	South Carolina	Active	
Kappa-Psi	September 20, 1970 – 1974	Villanova University	Villanova	Pennsylvania	Inactive	
Kappa-Omega	November 21, 1970 – 2022	University of North Carolina at Charlotte	Charlotte	North Carolina	Inactive	
Lambda-Alpha	December 5, 1970 – 1976	Northern Michigan University	Marquette	Michigan	Inactive	
**Lambda-Beta**	March 19, 1971 – 1984; 2006–201x ?; 2015–2019; 2023	East Tennessee State University	Johnson City	Tennessee	Active	
**Lambda-Gamma**	March 26, 1971 – 200x ?; 2008	Jacksonville State University	Jacksonville	Alabama	Active	
**Lambda-Delta**	April 2, 1971 – 2019; 2024	University of West Georgia	Carrollton	Georgia	Active	
**Lambda-Epsilon**	April 30, 1971	University of Central Florida	Orlando	Florida	Active	
**Lambda-Zeta**	May 14, 1971 –2009; 2022	Virginia Commonwealth University	Richmond	Virginia	Active	(Note: The university suspended the chapter for four years (through the end of the spring 2028 semester) for hazing and alcohol violations.)
Lambda-Eta	August 25, 1972 – 20xx ?	Lamar University	Beaumont	Texas	Inactive	
Lambda-Theta	September 25, 1972 – 1980	Dallas Baptist University	Dallas,	Texas	Inactive	(Note: University now only allows local fraternities.)
**Lambda-Iota**	April 27, 1973	Lyon College	Batesville	Arkansas	Active	
**Lambda-Kappa**	May 18, 1973 – 200x ?; 2022	Montana State University Billings	Billings	Montana	Active	
Lambda-Lambda	September 21, 1973 – 2019	Elon University	Elon	North Carolina	Inactive	
Lambda-Mu	December 14, 1973 – 200x ?	Southern New Hampshire University	Manchester	New Hampshire	Inactive	
**Lambda-Nu**	February 9, 1974	Appalachian State University	Boone	North Carolina	Active	
**Lambda-Xi**	March 29, 1974	Georgia College & State University	Milledgeville	Georgia	Active	
**Lambda-Omicron**	May 4, 1974	University of North Alabama	Florence	Alabama	Active	
**Lambda-Pi**	January 11, 1975	Delta State University	Cleveland	Mississippi	Active	
Lambda-Rho	December 14, 1975 – 1982	Nathaniel Hawthorne College	Antrim	New Hampshire	Inactive	(Note: Its name was shortened to Hawthorne College when it merged with the Florida Institute of Technology in the 1980s. The College then closed altogether in 1988.)
**Lambda-Sigma**	February 27, 1976 – 2014; 2018	James Madison University	Harrisonburg	Virginia	Active	
**Lambda-Tau**	November 13, 1976	Baylor University	Waco	Texas	Active	
Lambda-Upsilon	March 25, 1977 – 2012	Emporia State University	Emporia	Kansas	Inactive	
Lambda-Phi	March 11, 1978 – 1991; 1996–2002; 2008–202x ?	Sam Houston State University	Huntsville	Texas	Inactive	
Lambda-Chi	April 28, 1979 – 2023	College of Idaho	Caldwell	Idaho	Inactive	
**Lambda-Psi**	February 16, 1980 – 200x ?; 2012	St. Mary's University	San Antonio	Texas	Active	
**Lambda-Omega**	November 15, 1980 – 20xx ?	Lander University	Greenwood	South Carolina	Colony	
**Mu-Alpha**	April 25, 1981 – 200x ?; 2007–20xx ?	Colorado State University Pueblo	Pueblo	Colorado	Colony	
Mu-Beta	January 23, 1982 – 20xx ?	Huntingdon College	Montgomery	Alabama	Inactive	
Mu-Gamma	May 8, 1983	Texas A&M University	College Station	Texas	Inactive	(Note: Chapter suspended and expelled following 2025 hazing incident.)
**Mu-Delta**	November 20, 1982	University of California, Irvine	Irvine	California	Active	
Mu-Epsilon	February 26, 1983 – 2019	Linfield College	McMinnville	Oregon	Inactive	
**Mu-Zeta**	March 26, 1983	University of North Carolina Wilmington	Wilmington	North Carolina	Active	
**Mu-Eta**	November 5, 1983	University of Louisville	Louisville	Kentucky	Active	
Mu-Theta	December 3, 1983 – 1990	Davis & Elkins College	Elkins	West Virginia	Inactive	
**Mu-Iota**	December 10, 1983	Gallaudet University	Washington	District of Columbia	Active	
Mu-Kappa	March 3, 1984 – 1997	University at Buffalo	Buffalo	New York	Inactive	
**Mu-Lambda**	March 10, 1984	University of Calgary	Calgary	Alberta, Canada	Active	
Mu-Xi	March 3, 1984 – 200x ?	California State University, Fullerton	Fullerton	California	Colony	
**Mu-Omicron**	April 14, 1984	Louisiana State University Shreveport	Shreveport	Louisiana	Active	
**Mu-Rho**	April 28, 1984	Missouri State University	Springfield	Missouri	Active	
Mu-Sigma	May 4, 1985 – 200x ?; 2012–2020	Towson University	Towson	Maryland	Inactive	
Mu-Tau	October 19, 1985 – 2015; 2020–2023	Austin Peay State University	Clarksville	Tennessee	Inactive	
**Mu-Upsilon**	November 16, 1985	University of Northern Iowa	Cedar Falls	Iowa	Active	
Mu-Phi	December 8, 1985 – 1987	Yale University	New Haven	Connecticut	Inactive	
Mu-Psi	November 14, 1987 – October 27, 2021	Boston University	Boston	Massachusetts	Inactive	(Note: The college closed the chapter over allegations of a sexual assault.)
**Mu-Omega**	January 14, 1989 – 200x ?, 2008	Southeastern Louisiana University	Hammond	Louisiana	Active	
**Nu-Alpha**	May 6, 1989 – 2005; 2014	California Polytechnic State University, San Luis Obispo	San Luis Obispo	California	Active	
Nu-Beta	November 4, 1989 – 200x ?	Northern Illinois University	DeKalb	Illinois	Inactive	
Nu-Gamma	January 27, 1990 – 2022	Pratt Institute	Brooklyn	New York	Inactive	
Nu-Delta	May 5, 1990 – 200x ?	University of Alabama at Birmingham	Birmingham	Alabama	Inactive	
**Nu-Epsilon**	June 2, 1990 – 199x ?; 2000–2020; November 2025	New Mexico State University	Las Cruces	New Mexico	Active	(Note: The university removed the campus in 2020 after a pledge was shot in the leg during an initiation event.)
Nu-Zeta	February 9, 1991 – 2010	University of Wisconsin–Oshkosh	Oshkosh	Wisconsin	Inactive	
**Nu-Theta**	March 2, 1991	Morehead State University	Morehead	Kentucky	Active	
Nu-Eta	April 6, 1991 – 2010	Hofstra University	Hempstead	New York	Inactive	
**Nu-Iota**	April 13, 1991 – 2007; 2018	Rowan University	Glassboro	New Jersey	Active	
**Nu-Kappa**	November 16, 1991 – 199x ?; 2008–2018; 202x ?	University of Central Arkansas	Conway	Arkansas	Active	
**Nu-Lambda**	December 8, 1991	California State University, Sacramento	Sacramento	California	Active	
Nu-Xi	February 14, 1992 – 2002	Alfred University	Alfred	New York	Inactive	
**Nu-Omicron**	March 28, 1992	University of Texas at Dallas	Dallas	Texas	Active	
Nu-Rho	November 1, 1992 – 200x ?	Southeastern Oklahoma State University	Durant	Oklahoma	Inactive	
Nu-Sigma	December 12, 1992 – 20xx ?	Radford University	Radford	Virginia	Inactive	
**Nu-Tau**	March 27, 1993	Stephen F. Austin State University	Nacogdoches	Texas	Active	
Nu-Upsilon	May 8, 1993 – 2017	Winthrop University	Rock Hill	South Carolina	Inactive	
**Nu-Phi**	May 15, 1993	Northeastern State University	Tahlequah	Oklahoma	Active	
**Nu-Psi**	April 23, 1994 – 2000; 2017	University of Cincinnati	Cincinnati	Ohio	Active	
Nu-Omega	April 23, 1994 – 200x ?	University of Tampa	Tampa	Florida	Inactive	
Xi-Alpha	May 14, 1994 – 200x ?	Minnesota State University, Mankato	Mankato	Minnesota	Inactive	
**Xi-Beta**	March 4, 1995	Northeastern University	Boston	Massachusetts	Active	
Xi-Gamma	April 1, 1995 – 2019	State University of New York at New Paltz	New Paltz	New York	Inactive	
**Xi-Delta**	April 29, 1995	University of Texas at San Antonio	San Antonio	Texas	Active	
**Xi-Epsilon**	March 30, 1996	Thiel College	Greenville	Pennsylvania	Active	
Xi-Zeta	July 27, 1996 – 200x ?	Northwest Missouri State University	Maryville	Missouri	Inactive	
Xi-Eta	November 16, 1996 – 2023	Christian Brothers University	Memphis	Tennessee	Inactive	
Xi-Theta	November 16, 1996 – 2018	Valdosta State University	Valdosta	Georgia	Inactive	
**Xi-Iota**	November 16, 1996	Columbus State University	Columbus	Georgia	Active	
Xi-Kappa	December 7, 1996 – 20xx ?; 2021–2024	Florida International University	Miami	Florida	Colony	
Xi-Lambda	March 22, 1997 – 2018	University of Delaware	Newark, Delaware	Delaware	Inactive	
**Xi-Mu**	April 18, 1998 – 200x; 2026 -	West Texas A&M University	Canyon	Texas	Active	
**Xi-Nu**	March 27, 1999 – 2003; February 10, 2018	University of Western Ontario	London	Ontario, Canada	Active	
Xi-Xi	April 10, 1999 – October 30, 2021	Marquette University	Milwaukee	Wisconsin	Inactive	(Note: The national fraternity expelled the chapter for a financial delinquency” of $21,810, and violations the fraternity’s constitution, rules, and by-laws.)
**Xi-Omicron**	May 1, 1999 – 2000	Eastern Michigan University	Ypsilanti	Michigan	Inactive	
**Xi-Rho**	February 5, 2000	Stockton University	Galloway	New Jersey	Active	
**Xi-Sigma**	August 25, 2001 – 20xx ?; 2021 –	Western Carolina University	Cullowhee	North Carolina	Active	
Xi-Tau	April 27, 2002 – 20xx ?	John Carroll University	University Heights	Ohio	Inactive	
**Xi-Upsilon**	September 28, 2002 – 200x ?; 2008	East Texas A&M University	Commerce	Texas	Active	(Note: Texas A&M University at Commerce changed its name to East Texas A&M University on 7 November 2024.)
Xi-Phi	April 26, 2003 – December 2014	University of South Carolina Upstate	Spartanburg	South Carolina	Inactive	(Note: The university banned the fraternity for hazing and drug problems.)
Xi-Chi	April 24, 2004 – 2016	University of Northern Colorado	Greeley	Colorado	Inactive	
Xi-Psi	November 6, 2004 – 2020	University of North Florida	Jacksonville	Florida	Inactive	(Note: The fraternity was expelled from campus after a member was found responsible for sexual misconduct, harassment, endangerment and conspiracy.)
**Xi-Omega**	November 13, 2004	Idaho State University	Pocatello	Idaho	Active	
Omicron-Alpha	December 10, 2004 – 20xx ?	Rochester Institute of Technology	Rochester	New York	Inactive	
Omicron-Beta	April 9, 2005 – 2015	LIU Post	Brookville	New York	Inactive	
**Omicron-Gamma**	April 9, 2005	Arkansas Tech University	Russellville	Arkansas	Active	
Omicron-Delta	April 16, 2005 – 200x ?	Suffolk University	Boston	Massachusetts	Inactive	
**Omicron-Epsilon**	September 24, 2005	Adelphi University	Garden City	New York	Active	
**Omicron-Zeta**	October 28, 2005	University of Hawaii	Honolulu	Hawaii	Active	
**Omicron-Eta**	December 10, 2005 – 2022; April 27, 2024	Nova Southeastern University	Davie	Florida	Active	
**Omicron-Theta**	February 25, 2006	Thompson Rivers University	Kamloops	British Columbia, Canada	Active	
**Omicron-Iota**	April 1, 2006 – 2023	Armstrong State University	Savannah	Georgia	Colony	
Omicron-Kappa	April 29, 2006 – 2023	Kennesaw State University	Kennesaw	Georgia	Inactive	
Omicron-Lambda	May 6, 2006 – 2015	Southern Polytechnic State University	Marietta	Georgia	Inactive	(Note: Chapter merged with Omicron-Kappa when SPSU merged with Kennesaw State University.)
Omicron-Mu	November 18, 2006 – 2023	California State University, Bakersfield	Bakersfield	California	Inactive	
Omicron-Nu	December 2, 2006 – 2010	Murray State University	Murray	Kentucky	Inactive	
Omicron-Xi	December 2, 2006 – 2024	University of Lethbridge	Lethbridge	Alberta, Canada	Inactive	
**Omicron-Omicron**	December 2, 2006	Kutztown University of Pennsylvania	Kutztown	Pennsylvania	Active	
**Omicron-Pi**	March 17, 2007	Carleton University	Ottawa	Ontario, Canada	Active	
**Omicron-Rho**	March 31, 2007	University of Michigan–Flint	Flint	Michigan	Active	
**Omicron-Sigma**	March 31, 2007	Slippery Rock University	Slippery Rock	Pennsylvania	Active	
**Omicron-Tau**	April 14, 2007	University of Arkansas–Fort Smith	Fort Smith	Arkansas	Active	
Omicron-Upsilon	April 28, 2007 – 2019	Temple University	Philadelphia	Pennsylvania	Inactive	(Note: Chapter was suspended from campus for three years for violations of the student code of conduct.)
**Omicron-Phi**	April 14, 2007	Washington College	Chestertown	Maryland	Active	
**Omicron-Chi**	April 28, 2007	Nicholls State University	Thibodaux	Louisiana	Active	
Omicron-Psi	September 15, 2007 – 2020	Bloomsburg University of Pennsylvania	Bloomsburg	Pennsylvania	Inactive	
**Omicron-Omega**	September 22, 2007	California State University, Stanislaus	Turlock	California	Active	
**Pi-Alpha**	December 1, 2007 – 2010 and August 15, 2024 - Present	Louisiana State University of Alexandria	Alexandria	Louisiana	Colony	
Pi-Beta	December 8, 2007 – 201x ?	Loyola Marymount University	Los Angeles	California	Inactive	
Pi-Gamma	January 26, 2008 – 2020	Johnson & Wales University North Miami Campus	North Miami	Florida	Inactive	
Pi-Delta	February 2, 2008 – 2024	University of Virginia's College at Wise	Wise	Virginia	Inactive	
**Pi-Epsilon**	February 16, 2008	University of Houston	Houston	Texas	Active	
Pi-Zeta	March 8, 2008 – 2024	Johnson and Wales University Charlotte Campus	Charlotte	North Carolina	Inactive	
**Pi-Eta**	May 3, 2008	Missouri Southern State University	Joplin	Missouri	Active	
Pi-Theta	August 23, 2008 – 2024	Coastal Carolina University	Conway	South Carolina	Inactive	
**Pi-Iota**	September 6, 2008	California State University, Chico	Chico	California	Active	
**Pi-Kappa**	October 4, 2008	Bentley University	Waltham	Massachusetts	Active	
Pi-Lambda	November 1, 2008 – 201x ?	Penn State Harrisburg	Harrisburg	Pennsylvania	Inactive	
Pi-Mu	November 16, 2008 – 2023	Methodist University	Fayetteville	North Carolina	Inactive	
**Pi-Nu**	December 6, 2008	Ramapo College of New Jersey	Mahwah	New Jersey	Active	
**Pi-Xi**	December 6, 2008	Colorado State University	Fort Collins	Colorado	Active	
Pi-Omicron	February 28, 2009 – 201x ?	University of Colorado Colorado Springs	Colorado Springs	Colorado	Inactive	
**Pi-Rho**	April 4, 2009	University of Akron	Akron	Ohio	Active	
**Pi-Tau**	April 10, 2009 – 2019; December 9, 2023	New Mexico Institute of Mining and Technology	Socorro	New Mexico	Active	
Pi-Upsilon	April 18, 2009 – 2020	Academy of Art University	San Francisco	California	Inactive	
**Pi-Sigma**	May 9, 2009	Salisbury University	Salisbury	Maryland	Active	
**Pi-Phi**	October 30, 2009	Brooklyn College	Brooklyn	New York	Active	
Pi-Chi	August 29, 2009 – 2018	Lake Erie College	Painesville	Ohio	Inactive	
**Pi-Psi**	September 26, 2009	University of California, San Diego	La Jolla	California	Active	
**Pi-Omega**	November 7, 2009	Sacred Heart University	Fairfield	Connecticut	Active	
Rho-Alpha	November 7, 2009 – 20xx ?	University of Pittsburgh at Bradford	Bradford	Pennsylvania	Inactive	
**Rho-Beta**	December 5, 2009 – 2018; 2024	St. John's University	Queens	New York	Active	
Rho-Gamma	January 23, 2010 – 202x ?	Texas Woman's University	Denton	Texas	Inactive	
**Rho-Delta**	February 27, 2010	California State University, Northridge	Northridge	California	Active	
Rho-Epsilon	March 3, 2010 – 201x ?	University of Alaska Anchorage	Anchorage	Alaska	Inactive	
**Rho-Zeta**	April 1, 2010	Florida Gulf Coast University	Fort Myers	Florida	Active	
Rho-Eta	April 17, 2010 – February 16, 2023	High Point University	High Point	North Carolina	Inactive	
**Rho-Theta**	April 24, 2010	University of New Orleans	New Orleans	Louisiana	Active	
Rho-Iota	May 1, 2010 – 20xx ?	State University of New York College at Cortland	Cortland	New York	Inactive	
**Rho-Kappa**	May 29, 2010	California State University, Monterey Bay	Monterey Bay	California	Active	
Rho-Lambda	October 2, 2010 – 2024	Belmont Abbey College	Belmont	North Carolina	Inactive	
**Rho-Mu**	November 13, 2010	Central Washington University	Ellensburg	Washington	Active	
**Rho-Nu**	December 4, 2010 –November 3, 2015; December 2, 2023	University of Texas at Tyler	Tyler	Texas	Active	(Note: The national fraternity closed the chapter in 2015 for allegations of inappropriate behavior.)
**Rho-Xi**	December 4, 2010	Eastern Kentucky University	Richmond	Kentucky	Active	
**Rho-Omicron**	February 12, 2011	University of California, Merced	Merced	California	Inactive	
**Rho-Pi**	February 19, 2011	Young Harris College	Young Harris	Georgia	Active	
**Rho-Rho**	April 30, 2011	Abraham Baldwin Agricultural College	Tifton	Georgia	Active	
Rho-Sigma	April 30, 2011 – 2024	St. John's University Staten Island Campus	Staten Island	New York	Inactive	
**Rho-Tau**	August 13, 2011	Queens College, City University of New York	Queens	New York	Active	
**Rho-Upsilon**	August 27, 2011 – 2016; April 26, 2025	University of the Incarnate Word	San Antonio	Texas	Active	
Rho-Phi	November 19, 2011 – 201x ?	Utah Valley University	Orem	Utah	Inactive	
Rho-Chi	December 3, 2011 – 2017	University of Mary Washington	Fredericksburg	Virginia	Inactive	
**Rho-Psi**	January 21, 2012 – 2015; May 4, 2024	Texas A&M University-Corpus Christi	Corpus Christi	Texas	Active	
**Rho-Omega**	January 28, 2012	Stevens Institute of Technology	Hoboken	New Jersey	Active	
**Sigma-Alpha**	March 10, 2012	Trinity College	Hartford	Connecticut	Active	
Sigma-Beta	March 21, 2012 – 2016	Oglethorpe University	Atlanta	Georgia	Inactive	
**Sigma-Gamma**	April 28, 2012	Henderson State University	Arkadelphia	Arkansas	Active	
**Sigma-Delta**	May 12, 2012	Stony Brook University	Stony Brook	New York	Active	
**Sigma-Epsilon**	September 8, 2012	Hunter College	New York City	New York	Active	
**Sigma-Zeta**	September 15, 2012	Northwood University	Midland	Michigan	Active	
Sigma-Eta	November 17, 2012 – 202x ?	Central Michigan University	Mount Pleasant	Michigan	Inactive	
**Sigma-Theta**	December 1, 2012	Old Dominion University	Norfolk	Virginia	Active	
**Sigma-Iota**	December 8, 2012	St. Norbert College	De Pere	Wisconsin	Active	
**Sigma-Kappa**	January 19, 2013 – 2018	Grand Valley State University	Allendale	Michigan	Colony	
**Sigma-Lambda**	January 19, 2013	Christopher Newport University	Newport News	Virginia	Active	
**Sigma-Mu**	January 26, 2013	Colorado Mesa University	Grand Junction	Colorado	Active	
Sigma-Nu	February 9, 2013 – 2022	Binghamton University	Binghamton	New York	Inactive	
**Sigma-Xi**	March 23, 2013	University of West Florida	Pensacola	Florida	Active	
Sigma-Omicron	March 23, 2013 – 2016	Furman University	Greenville	South Carolina	Inactive	
**Sigma-Pi**	April 13, 2013 – 2018; February 24, 2024	University at Albany, State University of New York	Albany	New York	Active	
**Sigma-Rho**	April 27, 2013	Southern Illinois University Edwardsville	Edwardsville	Illinois	Active	
Sigma-Sigma	May 4, 2013 – 202x ?	Minnesota State University Moorhead	Moorhead	Minnesota	Inactive	
Sigma-Tau	May 18, 2013 – 202x ?	Western Oregon University	Monmouth	Oregon	Inactive	
**Sigma-Upsilon**	May 18, 2013	University of California, Riverside	Riverside	California	Active	
**Sigma-Phi**	January 1, 2014	Campbell University	Buies Creek	North Carolina	Active	
**Sigma-Psi**	March 22, 2014	Catholic University of America	Washington	District of Columbia	Active	
**Sigma-Omega**	April 5, 2014	Santa Clara University	Santa Clara	California	Active	
Tau-Alpha	April 19, 2014 – 2024	State University of New York at Geneseo	Geneseo	New York	Inactive	
Tau-Beta	April 26, 2014 – 2024	California State Polytechnic University, Humboldt	Arcata	California	Inactive	
**Tau-Gamma**	April 26, 2014	University of Nevada, Reno	Reno	Nevada	Active	
**Tau-Delta**	May 10, 2014	Pace University	New York	New York	Active	
Tau-Epsilon	October 11, 2014 – 2024	Gonzaga University	Spokane	Washington	Inactive	
**Tau-Zeta**	November 15, 2014	Arkansas State University	Jonesboro	Arkansas	Active	
**Tau-Eta**	November 22, 2014	University of Rhode Island	Kingston	Rhode Island	Active	
Tau-Theta	January 31, 2015 – 2019	West Chester University	West Chester	Pennsylvania	Inactive	
**Tau-Iota**	March 7, 2015	Farmingdale State College	East Farmingdale	New York	Active	
**Tau-Kappa**	March 14, 2015	Indiana University Southeast	New Albany	Indiana	Active	
Tau-Lambda	March 28, 2015 – 20xx ?	Johnson & Wales University Providence Campus	Providence	Rhode Island	Inactive	
**Tau-Mu**	April 18, 2015	Capital University	Bexley	Ohio	Active	
**Tau-Nu**	April 25, 2015	Marshall University	Huntington	West Virginia	Active	
**Tau-Xi**	May 2, 2015	Bethel University	McKenzie	Tennessee	Active	
**Tau-Omicron**	September 12, 2015	California State University, San Marcos	San Marcos	California	Active	
**Tau-Pi**	September 19, 2015	San Francisco State University	San Francisco	California	Active	
Tau-Rho	October 3, 2015 – 2020	Ithaca College	Ithaca	New York	Inactive	
**Tau-Sigma**	October 24, 2015	Angelo State University	San Angelo	Texas	Active	
**Tau-Tau**	December 5, 2015	University of Wisconsin–Milwaukee	Milwaukee	Wisconsin	Active	
**Tau-Upsilon**	February 20, 2016	York University	Toronto	Ontario, Canada	Active	
**Tau-Phi**	March 12, 2016	Hartwick College	Oneonta	New York	Active	
**Tau-Chi**	April 9, 2016 – April 7, 2022; May 6, 2023	Fairleigh Dickinson University	Madison	New Jersey	Active	
**Tau-Psi**	April 23, 2016	State University of New York at Fredonia	Fredonia	New York	Active	
**Tau-Omega**	September 17, 2016	Montclair State University	Montclair	New Jersey	Active	
**Upsilon-Alpha**	September 17, 2016	Reinhardt University	Waleska	Georgia	Active	
**Upsilon-Beta**	September 24, 2016	California State University, San Bernardino	San Bernardino	California	Active	
**Upsilon-Gamma**	November 5, 2016	College of Staten Island	Staten Island	New York	Active	
Upsilon-Delta	November 5, 2016 – 2024	Eastern Washington University	Cheney	Washington	Inactive	
**Upsilon-Epsilon**	December 3, 2016	Marist College	Poughkeepsie	New York	Active	
**Upsilon-Eta**	February 4, 2017	University of Wisconsin–Green Bay	Green Bay	Wisconsin	Active	
**Upsilon-Kappa**	April 21, 2018	Monmouth University	West Long Branch	New Jersey	Active	
**Upsilon-Theta**	April 22, 2017	Saint Leo University	Saint Leo	Florida	Active	
**Upsilon-Lambda**	April 28, 2018	State University of New York at Oneonta	Oneonta	New York	Active	
Upsilon-Mu	May 5, 2018 – 2025	City College of New York	New York	New York	Inactive	
**Upsilon-Nu**	September 1, 2018	Eastern Connecticut State University	Willimantic	Connecticut	Active	
**Upsilon-Iota**	October 2, 2018	Florida Atlantic University	Boca Raton	Florida	Active	
Upsilon-Xi	February 9, 2019 – 2023	Rutgers University–Newark	Newark	New Jersey	Inactive	
**Upsilon-Omicron (West Haven)**	March 23, 2019	University of New Haven	West Haven	Connecticut	Active	(Note: As of 2025, Kappa Sigs refer to this as the West Haven chapter, as the chapter is not recognized by the university.)
Upsilon-Pi	April 13, 2019 – February 22, 2025	State University of New York at Oswego	Oswego	New York	Inactive	(Note: Chapter was suspended by the university for one year after a hazing incident that took place in February 2025.)
Upsilon-Rho	May 4, 2019 – 2024	California State University, Channel Islands	Camarillo	California	Inactive	
**Upsilon-Sigma**	January 2, 2020	University of Massachusetts Boston	Boston	Massachusetts	Active	
**Upsilon-Tau**	February 29, 2020	Merrimack College	North Andover	Massachusetts	Active	
**Upsilon-Upsilon**	March 13, 2021	Illinois State University	Normal	Illinois	Active	
**Upsilon-Zeta**	May 15, 2021	Middle Georgia State University	Macon	Georgia	Active	
**Upsilon-Phi**	November 13, 2021	University of Guelph	Guelph	Ontario, Canada	Active	
**Upsilon-Chi**	November 13, 2021	Baruch College	New York	New York	Active	
**Upsilon-Psi**	August 20, 2022	University of Missouri–Kansas City	Kansas City	Missouri	Active	
**Upsilon-Omega**	December 30, 2022	Tarleton State University	Stephenville	Texas	Active	
**Phi-Alpha**	February 25, 2023	The College of New Jersey	Ewing	New Jersey	Active	
**Phi-Beta**	April 22, 2023	Western New England University	Springfield	Massachusetts	Active	
**Phi-Gamma**	April 29, 2023	Cameron University	Lawton	Oklahoma	Active	
**Phi-Delta**	September 16, 2023	Penn State Erie, The Behrend College	Erie	Pennsylvania	Active	
**Phi-Epsilon**	February 10, 2024	Ohio University	Athens	Ohio	Active	
**Phi-Zeta**	September 21, 2024	University of South Carolina Aiken	Aiken	South Carolina	Active	
**Phi-Eta**	December 7, 2024	New Jersey Institute of Technology	Newark	New Jersey	Active	
**Phi-Theta**	April 12, 2025	Grand Canyon University	Phoenix	Arizona	Active	
**Phi-Iota**	December 6, 2025	Southern Utah University	Cedar City	Utah	Active	
**Phi-Kappa**	January 24, 2026	University of Hartford	Hartford	Connecticut	Active	
		Fitchburg State University	Fitchburg	Massachusetts	Colony	
		Jacksonville University	Jacksonville	Florida	Colony	
		State University of New York at Potsdam	Potsdam	New York	Colony	
		University of South Carolina Beaufort	Bluffton	South Carolina	Colony	
		University of Texas Permian Basin	Odessa	Texas	Colony	
		Utah Tech University	St. George	Utah	Colony	
		Western Michigan University	Kalamazoo	Michigan	Colony	
		Wright State University	Dayton	Ohio	Colony	

== Alumni chapters ==
Active chapters are indicated in bold. Inactive chapters are indicated in italic.

Chapter	Abbreviation	City	State	Status	Ref.
Alpha-Upsilon Alumni Chapter		Jackson	Mississippi	Active	
Atlanta Alumni Chapter of Kappa Sigma	AAC	Atlanta	Georgia	Active	
Beta-Gamma Alumni Association		St. Louis	Missouri	Active	
Beta-Lambda Alumni Chapter		Atlanta	Georgia	Active	
Birmingham Area Chapter of Kappa Sigma	BACKS	Birmingham	Alabama	Active	
Boston Area Alumni Chapter		Windham	New Hampshire	Active	
Central California Alumni		Fresno	California	Active	
Central South Carolina Alumni Chapter		Chapin	South Carolina	Active	
Chicago Area Alumni Chapter		Chicago	Illinois	Active	
Columbus Georgia Alumni Chapter		Columbus	Georgia	Active	
Connecticut Alumni Chapter		Avon	Connecticut	Active	
Dallas Alumni Chapter		Dallas	Texas	Active	
Delta Rho Star & Crescent Alumni Chapter		Cincinnati	Ohio	Active	
Delta State's Lambda Pi Alumni Chapter		Horn Lake	Mississippi	Active	
Epsilon Upsilon Alumni Chapter		Denton	Texas	Active	
Epsilon-Chi Alumni Association		Lafayette	Louisiana	Active	
Epsilon-Eta Alumni Association		Bowling Green	Ohio	Active	
Epsilon-Nu Alumni Association		Jackson	Mississippi	Active	
Gamma-Sigma Alumni Chapter		Corvallis	Oregon	Active	
Greater Miami Alumni Chapter		Miami	Florida	Active	
Greater Phoenix Alumni Chapter		Phoenix	Arizona	Active	
Greater Toronto Alumni Chapter		Toronto	Ontario	Active	
Houston Alumni Chapter		Katy	Texas	Active	
Kappa Sigma Alumni Association of Central Florida		Orlando	Florida	Active	
Kappa-Phi Alumni Chapter		Vienna	Virginia	Active	
Kappa-Rho Alumni Association		Boise	Idaho	Active	
Lambda-Gamma Alumni Association		Jacksonville	Alabama	Active	
Lambda Zeta Alumni Chapter		Broadway	Virginia	Active	
Los Angeles County Alumni Chapter		Sherman Oaks	California	Active	
Low Country Kappa Sigma Alumni Chapter		Charleston	South Carolina	Active	
Memphis Alumni Chapter		Memphis	Tennessee	Active	
Mu-Alpha/Colorado Alumni Chapter		Centennial	Colorado	Active	
Mu-Beta Alumni Association		Montgomery	Alabama	Active	
Nevada Alumni Chapter		Henderson	Nevada	Active	
Northeast Kansas Alumni Chapter		Topeka	Kansas	Active	
Northwest Louisiana Alumni Chapter		Shreveport	Louisiana	Active	
Nu-Epsilon Alumni Chapter		Las Cruces	New Mexico	Active	
New York City Alumni Chapter		New York City	New York	Active	
Portland Alumni of Kappa Sigma		Portland	Oregon	Active	
Rho Prime Alumni Chapter		Dahlonega	Georgia	Active	
San Diego Area Alumni Association		San Diego	California	Active	
San Francisco Bay Area Alumni Chapter		San Francisco	California	Active	
Southeast Virginia Alumni Chapter		Portsmouth	Virginia	Active	
Tau Chapter Alumni Association of Kappa Sigma		Austin	Texas	Active	
Theta-Rho Alumni Chapter		Lake Charles	Louisiana	Active	
Theta-Upsilon Alumni Chapter		Cincinnati	Ohio	Active	
Tucson Alumni Chapter		Tucson	Arizona	Active	
Xi-Beta Alumni Chapter		Boston	Massachusetts	Active	
Xi-Theta Alumni Chapter		Stockbridge	Georgia	Active	
