= Kappa Sigma =

North American collegiate fraternity

- ΚΣ
- Founded: December 10, 1869; 156 years ago University of Virginia
- Type: Social
- Affiliation: Independent
- Former affiliation: NIC
- Status: Active
- Scope: International
- Motto: Bononia Docet "Bologna Teaches"
- Pillars: Fellowship, Leadership, Scholarship, and Service
- Member badge

- Pledge pin
- Colors: Scarlet; White; Emerald Green; Gold
- Symbol: Star and Crescent
- Flag
- Flower: Lily of the Valley
- Publication: The Caduceus
- Philanthropy: A Greater Cause; Military Heroes Campaign
- Chapters: 318
- Members: 17,000 active 282,000 lifetime
- Nicknames: Kappa Sig, K-Sig
- Headquarters: 1610 Scottsville Road; Charlottesville, Virginia 22902; United States
- Website: kappasigma.org

Kappa Sigma (ΚΣ), commonly known as Kappa Sig or KSig, is an American collegiate social fraternity founded at the University of Virginia in 1869. Kappa Sigma is one of the five largest international fraternities which, as of 2013, had 318 active chapters and colonies in North America. Its endowment fund, founded in 1919, has donated more than $5 million to undergrads since 1948. In 2012 alone, the Fraternity's endowment fund raised over $1 million in donations.

== History ==
=== Traditional founding ===
According to the traditions of the fraternity, Kappa Sigma is based on a Medieval student group known in some accounts as "Kirjath Sepher", said to have been founded between 1395 and 1400 at the University of Bologna. The story says that the corrupt governor of the city, one-time pirate and later papal usurper Baldassare Cossa, took advantage of the students at Bologna, one of Europe's oldest universities which attracted students from all over the continent, by sending his men to assault and rob them; this motivated one of the university's scholars Manuel Chrysoloras to found a secret society of students beginning with five of his most devoted disciples, for mutual protection against Cossa.

=== Historical founding ===
The plaque at the entrance to the University of Virginia Kappa Sigma fraternity house, site of the fraternity's national founding in 1869

The Kappa Sigma chapter house at the University of New Hampshire in Durham, New Hampshire, in 1923

On December 10, 1869, five students at the University of Virginia met in 46 East Lawn and founded the Kappa Sigma Fraternity in America. William Grigsby McCormick, George Miles Arnold, John Covert Boyd, Edmund Law Rogers, Jr., and Frank Courtney Nicodemus established the fraternity based in part on the traditions of the student group from Bologna, Italy. These five founders became collectively known as the "Five Friends and Brothers".

=== 19th century ===
In 1872, Kappa Sigma initiated Stephen Alonzo Jackson, who would go on to transform a struggling local fraternity into a strong international Brotherhood. The organization attributes much of its success to Jackson noting that, "Since his death in 1892, the success of the Order is the direct result of Jackson's devotion 'to make Kappa Sigma the leading college fraternity of the world.'"

In 1873, Kappa Sigma expanded to Trinity College (now Duke University), the University of Maryland, and Washington and Lee University. The fraternity attributes this growth to the initiation of Stephen Alonzo Jackson in 1872. During his membership, Jackson expanded and revised the ritual of Kappa Sigma. He created the Supreme Executive Committee (SEC), which now serves as the governing body of the Kappa Sigma Fraternity on an international level. Jackson also introduced the idea of a frequent, national convention of all Kappa Sigmas, a practice now continued by the biennial Grand Conclave and characterized the event as "the finest hour" of Kappa Sigma.

In 1885, the publication of Kappa Sigma's quarterly magazine was commissioned under the name The Quarterly. This publication ran successfully for 5 years until it was reorganized to run bi-monthly and renamed The Caduceus, the name it holds to this day.

=== 20th century ===
In 1912, Wilbur F. Denious (who would later become Worthy Grand Master) struck upon the idea of establishing a charitable endowment for Kappa Sigma. As a result of his hard work he and many others, the Kappa Sigma Endowment Fund was established in 1919 "to support the charitable and beneficent purposes of the Kappa Sigma."

=== 21st century ===
In 2002, along with Phi Delta Theta, Kappa Sigma ended its involvement in the North American Interfraternity Conference. However, many individual chapters remain members of their host university's Interfraternity Conference, but no chapter is required to recognize or be involved with their university's IFC if they choose not to.

In 2003, the Kappa Sigma ushered in an unprecedented era of growth for the fraternity. In the Spring of 2005, Kappa Sigma began fundraising for and construction of a new headquarters. This $6 million project had its grand opening on June 2, 2007. At the 66th Conclave, the Kappa Sigma Endowment Fund was declared to be the only official educational foundation of the fraternity and is also housed at the new headquarters.

== Symbols ==
Kappa Sigma's Star and Crescent

Kappa Sigmas are taught to live their lives by the star and crescent, which are also the symbols of the fraternity that make up the official badge:

The Star and Crescent shall not be worn by every man, but only by him who is worthy to wear it.
He must be a gentleman ...
a man of honor and courage ...
a man of zeal, yet humble ...
an intelligent man ...
a man of truth ...
one who tempers action with wisdom and,
above all else, one who walks in the light of God.

Kappa Sigma's four pillars are fellowship, leadership, scholarship, and service. Its motto is Bononia docet, or "Bologna teaches".

The fraternity's original colors were maroon, old gold, and peacock blue. Its modern colors are scarlet, white, and emerald green. Its flower is the lily of the valley. Its publication is The Caduceus. The fraternity's nickname is Kappa Sig.

== Membership ==
To be eligible for membership a prospective member must profess a belief in God, though adherence to a specific religion is not required. In at least one situation, Kappa Sigma has revoked a chapter's charter for omitting the fraternity's religious requirements from its initiation.

== Philanthropy ==
While most activities of the Kappa Sigma Fraternity occur in the undergraduate chapters, the fraternity oversees several international programs or campaigns.

=== Greater Cause ===
The Greater Cause program encourages Kappa Sigma members to be active in their communities. The program aims to raise $25 for and dedicate 25 hours per year towards charitable causes for each member. The program also aims at having 100% of the eligible chapter members registered to vote. Every chapter organizes its charitable events, usually donating the proceeds to Kappa Sigma's Military Heroes Campaign or a local charity. During the 2015–2016 school year, Kappa Sigma chapters and colonies donated $3,653,930 million and 671,537 volunteer hours to charitable causes around the United States and Canada.

Some of the bigger events that chapters organize are the Catch-A-Dream Charity Classic Football Game organized by the Delta-Chi chapter at Mississippi State University, and the Apple Cup Run, jointly organized by the Beta-Psi chapter at the University of Washington and the Gamma-Mu chapter at Washington State University. The Governor's Cup Ball Run is jointly organized by the Mu-Eta chapter at the University of Louisville and the Beta-Nu chapter at the University of Kentucky. The Chi-Omega chapter at the University of South Carolina raises money annually for the Ray Tanner Foundation, which benefits economically and medically disadvantaged children in South Carolina, and the Columbia metropolitan area. The Kappa-Pi chapter at the University of Central Oklahoma hosts the Bath Tub push that benefits the Veterans' Families United Foundation.

=== Military Heroes ===
During the 66th Grand Conclave in 2007, the fraternity announced Kappa Sigma Fraternity Military Heroes Campaign, a charitable entity. Since its inception, the campaign has donated over $1,000,000 to non-profit organizations that advocate on behalf of servicemen and women and those wounded in combat. The Supreme Executive Committee determines how the contributions will be distributed to support these patriots and veterans. Some of these charities include the Fisher House Foundation, the SEAL Legacy Foundation, and the Valour Place.

=== Kappa Sigma Endowment Fund ===
In 1919, the Kappa Sigma Endowment Fund was established "to support the charitable and beneficent" of the fraternity. The Endowment Fund assists with the educational and leadership programming at each Conclave and Leadership Conference. In addition, each year, the Endowment Fund awards $250,000 in scholarships to undergraduate members. These scholarship and leadership awards are presented on Founders' Day (December 10). To date, the Endowment Fund has contributed over $5 million in scholarships since 1948. The Endowment Fund sponsors leadership conferences and Kappa Sigma's Biennial Grand Conclave.

== Organization ==
=== Undergraduate organization ===
Kappa Sigma has over 300 chapters and colonies (probationary chapters). Each chapter is led by a five-member executive committee consisting of officers. These officers include the Grand Master (president), Grand Procurator (first vice president), Grand Master of Ceremonies (second vice president), Grand Scribe (secretary), and Grand Treasurer.

=== Volunteer organization ===
Over 1,500 alumni volunteer as advisors for Kappa Sigma. At the international level, the Supreme Executive Council (SEC) sets policy for the fraternity, disciplines chapters, and approves the formation of colonies and chapter. The offices of the SEC mirror the office of the undergraduate executive committee and consist of the Worthy Grand Master, the Worthy Grand Procurator, the Worthy Grand Master of Ceremonies, the Worthy Grand Scribe, and the Worthy Grand Treasurer.

There are just under sixty districts covering the United and Canada that are divided into five areas. Typically, districts are composed of all the Kappa Sigma chapters and colonies within a state or province. Each district, composed of roughly five chapters, is overseen by the District Grand Masters and Assistant District Grand Masters who serve as liaisons between the undergraduate chapters and colonies and the Supreme Executive Council.

An alumnus adviser and several assistant alumnus advisers provide advice and assistance to each undergraduate chapter and colony. The Undergraduate Advisory Committee, which is made of one undergraduate from each of the five areas, is charged with representing their respective area as well as the general undergraduate perspective at all Supreme Executive Council meetings.

Kappa Sigma's international headquarters in Charlottesville, Virginia

=== Professional staff ===
The fraternity's professional staff is based at the international headquarters in Charlottesville, Virginia, which manages the day-to-day operations of the fraternity. The staff includes the executive director, currently Mitchell Wilson, and several program directors and administrative assistants. Also, based in the international headquarters are the Area Recruitment Managers (ARM), who are in charge of recruitment goals and provide assistance to chapters in their respective service area.

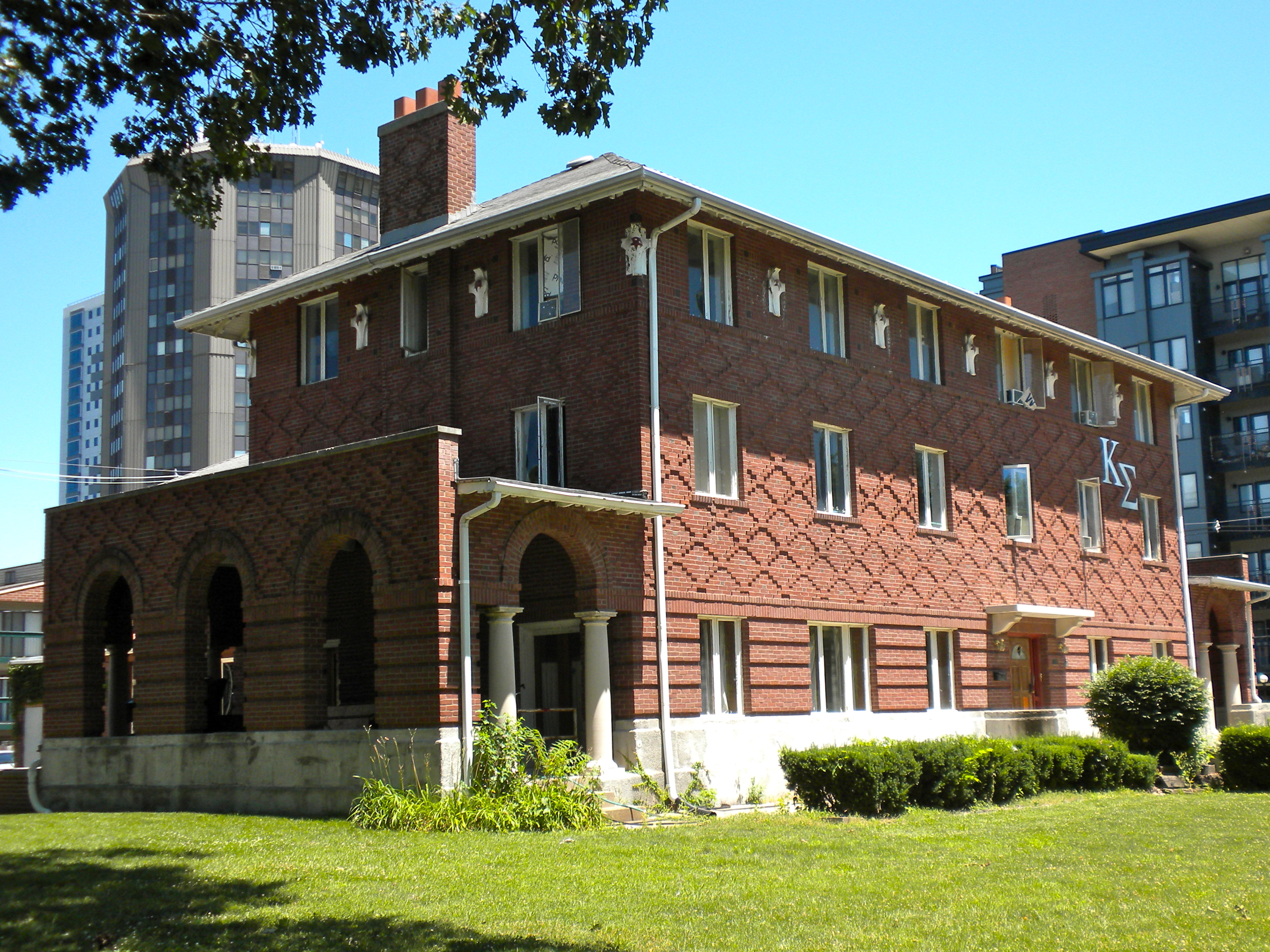
University of Illinois Urbana-Champaign chapter house in Champaign, Illinois, listed in the National Register of Historic Places

== Chapter and member misconduct ==
Kappa Sigma has a history of litigation and lasting cultural impact stemming from hazing and alcohol-related fatalities that have occurred at its college chapters.

In 1959, a high-profile death of a Kappa Sigma pledge occurred at the University of Southern California. Richard Swanson died during a hazing incident where he was told to eat a quarter-pound piece of raw liver whole. The incident inspired the 1977 film Fraternity Row, as well a CSI: Crime Scene Investigation episode titled "Pledging Mr. Johnson" and has been used in academic studies as a foundational case study of hazing risks at college campuses. Swanson's parents filed a $750,000 damage suit against the fraternity.

A 2001 drowning at the University of Miami led to the passage of the Chad Meredith Act, making hazing a criminal offence in the state. A jury awarded Meredith's parents $12.6 million in a negligence suit against the fraternity, the largest verdict against a fraternal organization Deaths involving alcohol poisoning or negligence have occurred at West Virginia University (2015), the University of Louisiana at Lafayette (2016), and the University of Connecticut (2017).

Several chapters have faced suspensions for allegations involving drug distribution and physical assault, notably at the University of Central Florida (2019) and New Mexico State University (2020), where an initiation event resulted in a member being shot in the leg.

In the past five years, the fraternity faced challenges and lawsuits from other hazing incidents. In 2023, the chapter at San Diego State University (SDSU) faced a hazing lawsuit after it was discovered a 19-year-old pledge was beaten and challenged to drink large amounts of alcohol in an initiation ritual. Other notable hazing incidents occurred at chapters from the University of Virginia (2024), Texas A&M University (2025), and the University of Georgia (2026).

Following incidents of hazing, Kappa Sigma has shut down local chapters and has expelled members for hazing.

=== Discriminatory incidents ===
The founding chapter at the University of Virginia has been investigated by the university and the student-run Inter Fraternity Council multiple times for alleged incidents of racist costumes and parties. In 2009, the chapter hosted a Cowboys & Indians-themed party where, according to photographs posted to social media, some members dressed in fake Native American costumes, wore redface, and posed for photographs simulating scalping. In 2011, members of the chapter hosted a similarly themed party, decorating the outside of their chapter house with imitations of Native American art, constructing a fake tipi, and dressing in costumes; this occurred despite intervention by the university and the Native American Student Union following the previous event to educate the chapter on cultural appropriation and violence against Native Americans. In 2019, the chapter hosted a bid event that featured multiple members wearing fake Native American headdresses and costumes; the Inter Fraternity Council and the Office of Fraternity & Sorority Life at the university both investigated the incident.

In January 2023, the Illinois State University chapter was suspended through 2025 after pledges spray-painted derogatory and homophobic slurs on several other fraternity and sorority houses on campus.

== See also ==
- List of social fraternities and sororities
