= Ridder =

Ridder may refer to:

== Places ==
- DeRidder, Louisiana, city in US state of Louisiana
- Ridder, Kazakhstan, city in Kazakhstan (named for Philip Ridder)

== Things ==
- Ridder (title), Dutch and Belgian title equivalent to knight
- Knight Ridder, newspaper chain
- Arbeidets Ridder, US newspaper (1880s), published in Minneapolis, Minnesota (Norwegian/Danish language; concerning news of interest to labor groups)
- Ridder Arena, an ice hockey arena in Saint Paul, Minnesota

== People ==
- Alexandra Simons de Ridder (born 1963), German equestrian
- Atie Ridder-Visser (1914–2014), Dutch resistance fighter during World War II
- Bernard J. Ridder (1913–1983), American newspaper publisher
- Daniël de Ridder (born 1984), Dutch football player
- Desmond Ridder (born 1999), American football player
- Eric Ridder (1918–1996), US sailor and Olympic athlete
- Georgia B. Ridder (1914–2002), American thoroughbred racehorse owner
- Herman Ridder (1851–1915), American newspaper publisher and editor
- Kathleen Ridder (1922–2017), American activist and philanthropist
- Koen Ridder (born 1985), Dutch badminton player
- Louis De Ridder (1902–1981), Belgian winter sports athlete
- Luis de Ridder (1928–2004), Argentine alpine skier
- Marcello de Ridder (1922–1973), Argentine bobsled athlete
- Marjan Ridder (born 1953), Dutch badminton player
- Peter de Ridder (born 1946), Dutch sailor and businessman
- Peter Hollander Ridder (1608–1692), Governor of New Sweden
- Philip Ridder (1759–1838), Russian explorer who discovered valuable metal ores in Kazakhstan
- Robert Ridder (1919–2000), American ice hockey administrator, media mogul
- Steve De Ridder (born 1987), Belgian football player
- Victor F. Ridder (1886–1963), American newspaper publisher
