= The Journal of Commerce =

US biweekly magazine on global trade topics

Journal of Commerce
- Editor: Mark Szakonyi, Executive Editor
- Frequency: Bi-weekly
- Circulation: 15,000
- Founded: September 1, 1827; 199 years ago
- Company: S&P Global
- Country: United States
- Based in: New York, NY
- Language: English
- Website: joc.com
- ISSN: 1530-7557

The Journal of Commerce is a biweekly magazine published in the United States that focuses on global trade topics. First published in 1827 in New York, it has a circulation of approximately 15,000. It provides editorial content to manage day-to-day international logistics and shipping needs, covering the areas of cargo and freight transportation, export and import, global transport logistics and trade, international supply chain management and US Customs regulations.

== 1800s ==
The first issue of the Journal of Commerce was printed by Arthur Tappan and Samuel Morse on September 1, 1827. The newspaper operated two deepwater schooners to intercept incoming vessels and get stories ahead of the competition. Following Morse's invention of the telegraph, the JOC was a founding member of the Associated Press, now the world's largest news-gathering organization.

In 1840, the paper merged with the Daily Gazette and General Advertiser, which had been founded as the Independent Journal in 1783 and was noted for being the first to publish The Federalist Papers. The paper briefly changed its name to the Journal of Commerce and Gazette to reflect the merger, reverting to its previous name less than a year later.

Publications in the 19th century took positions on political issues and were rarely concerned with being impartial. The JOC weighed in on the biggest issue of the day, slavery. Gerard Hallock and David Hale, partners in the JOC, were opponents of slavery but also critics of Abolitionists, and they decried the tactics of the war wing of the Republican Party.

After the American Civil War broke out in 1861, the US Postmaster General suspended the paper's mail privileges, effectively interrupting its publication, on grounds of "disloyalty." Hallock challenged the decision but failed to have it overturned. With its evening edition suspended and the morning edition distributed only to non-postal subscribers, editor Gerard Hallock stepped down on August 31, 1861. David M Stone, head of the commercial news department, and William Cowper, took over his interest in the Journal. Three years later, President Abraham Lincoln ordered the JOC closed after it was among New York papers victimized by a bogus story quoting the president as calling for 400,000 more volunteers.

Following the Civil War, David Stone and William C. Prime, a lawyer who invested part of his fortune in the paper converted the paper from a partnership into a corporation. Prime soon retired to become president of the Metropolitan Museum of Art. Though continuing as one of the lead investors, Prime left Stone in sole control. Stone devoted himself to the paper, writing most of the editorials and many of the page one stories.

But he neglected the paper's physical plant, allowing its technology to become outdated. The Type was still set by hand in an era when most papers had switched over to linotype machines. The paper lost ground to its competitors, including the Daily Commercial Bulletin, founded in 1865 and owned by William Dodsworth, a friend of Stone's. But unlike his friend, Dodsworth believed it was more important to invest earnings in plant and equipment than to pay it out to investors.

In 1893, Prime and Stone agreed to sell the JOC to Dodsworth and merge it with the Commercial Bulletin. Though Dodsworth was the acquirer, he retained the JOC's name. The new paper became The Journal of Commerce and Commercial Bulletin, a name that was to be maintained through the 1990s.

The merged paper benefited enormously from the Commercial's new presses and linotype machines, each of which could replace three or four men setting type by hand, one letter at a time. The papers also had complementary advertising support. The Commercial drew advertising from the grocery and provisions business, from insurance and banking. The JOC's coverage focused on shipping and chemicals, textiles and insurance.

When Dodsworth took over, he immediately laid off most members of both staffs. He did not want writers who could not write on the new typewriting machines or compositors who could not run linotypes.

== 1900s ==
After the 1907 panic, a young editor at The Journal of Commerce, H. Parker Willis, became a leader in the drive to establish a central bank. He teamed up with Virginia Senator Carter Glass to write the Federal Reserve Act. Much of the work was done in the offices of the JOC.

Throughout its history, the JOC maintained a different perspective on the news. Coverage of major events, such as the San Francisco earthquake of 1906 and the US entry into World War I, emphasized the effect on business. During World War II, the JOC reprinted and indexed the wartime regulations that controlled production and supplies.

The JOC's profits boomed during World War I with a sharp increase in advertising and circulation related to the wartime industrial expansion. The growth continued into the early 1920s. Then in 1921, the Dodsworths sold the paper to William C. Reick, who acquired it with money put up by Charles A. Stoneham, the wealthy owner of racehorses and the New York Giants. After Reick died in 1924, Stoneham appointed a new front man, Raphael Govin, who pushed the JOC into more sports coverage.

Willis, who had become editor-in-chief of the JOC in 1919, watched with alarm as the paper's profits began to dwindle, when everyone else in the Roaring Twenties was making money. After Govin died and the JOC appeared to be on the verge of extinction, the paper was purchased in 1927 by the three Ridder brothers: Bernard H., Joseph E. and Victor F. They were the sons of Herman Ridder, the publisher of the German-language New Yorker Staats-Zeitung, the New Yorker Herald and the Long Island Daily Press.

The outbreak of World War II dramatically affected financial and commodity markets. The Ridder brothers soon built a newspaper empire of their own. They sold the JOC's AP franchise, which was a valuable asset in a day when access to the AP wires was restricted to franchise-holders. This enabled them to buy the St. Paul Pioneer Press-Dispatch. Bernard H. Ridder became publisher of the Pioneer Press-Dispatch, turning the JOC presidency over to Joseph E. Ridder.

In the postwar years, the JOC also earned a reputation as a prime source of international trade news. In 1973 the paper scooped the world on perhaps the most significant economic development of the last 30 years. Six days ahead of any other newspaper, the JOC reported that Arab nations were going to embargo oil shipments to the US.

On Saturday, October 20, 1973, as the Yom Kippur War raged, the world learned that Arab nations would be suspending the supply of oil to the United States. The JOC had the story of the notorious Arab oil embargo more than a week earlier. "It was a story that impacted the entire world", said Harold Gold, who was editor of the JOC at the time. Few thought the Arab nations would use oil as a weapon against the US in response to its military support for Israel, which included a $2.2 billion military aid package. There had been threats, but since an attempted embargo in 1967 failed, most dismissed the idea that it would ever happen.

In the later part of the 20th century, the JOC intensified its coverage of shipping, earning its nickname as the Bible of the maritime industry. Shipping was transformed forever by the introduction by Malcom McLean in 1956 of the container ship. Containerized shipping made traditional breakbulk ports obsolete and provided the means for Asia's export boom, which changed the world's economic map. The JOC reported in detail on these and other developments in transportation and logistics.

The JOC never missed a day of publication, even on February 26, 1993, when a terrorist bomb detonated in the garage under the World Trade Center, killing six people. The paper's New York staff managed to find its way down the darkened, smoke-filled fire-escape stairs of the tower to safety below. The staff at the Phillipsburg, New Jersey printing plant put the paper out that day.

The shipping industry, which had flourished through the 1960s and 1970s, began a period of consolidation in the mid-1990s because of plunging freight rates. Separate shipping companies that had run multiple ads in the paper merged and eliminated competing routes. With the rapid growth of the Internet in the 1990s, many shipping companies began to switch their ship schedules onto their Web sites, where shippers around the world could access them.

Knight-Ridder decided to get out of business information altogether to focus on its daily metropolitan newspapers. In 1995, it sold the JOC to The Economist Group of London, publishers of the widely respected The Economist. Under The Economist Group, the JOC tightened its focus to cover international trade logistics. In 1999, the broadsheet newspaper was converted to a tabloid newspaper format.

== 2000s ==
It became increasingly apparent that a print newspaper with a worldwide readership faced a struggle to keep its readers up-to-date on breaking news. By the time the newspaper was delivered, most readers had already gotten their news by fax, telephone or on the Internet. In 2000, the JOC converted its daily print publication into a weekly magazine, JOC Week, which provided an analysis of trade logistics.

In 2001, The Economist sold the JOC to Commonwealth Business Media, the New Jersey–based publisher of Pacific Shipper, Canadian Sailings, and a number of railroad and trucking directories. The new owners had long-standing connections with the transportation industry, having previously owned Traffic World, another magazine acquired with its purchase of the JOC Group.

In 2006, United Business Media acquired Commonwealth Business Media, from its owners: RFE Investment Partners, Bariston Partners, The Economist Group, ABRY Partners and Commonwealth's management. In 2008, United Business Media reorganized Commonwealth Business Media into two separate market-focused businesses. The Journal of Commerce became a part of the UBM Global Trade group, focusing on serving professional communities engaged in commercial sea, rail and road transportation and logistics worldwide.

On March 2, 2009, Traffic World magazine and The Journal of Commerce merged into one publication under the flagship Journal of Commerce banner. The JOC introduced a redesigned, comprehensive editorial product that uses data from PIERS: The Port Import/Export Reporting Service to enhance news stories to offer a variety of Web tools that will complement its move to a digital environment with real-time focus, and provide more analysis and market-oriented content. The combined publication integrates the trucking, rail transport, express and domestic-focused logistics coverage of Traffic World with the international, US Customs, container shipping, intermodal and breakbulk focus of The Journal of Commerce titles. Pacific Shipper and other regional publications were also merged into The Journal of Commerce. The new publication was led by Paul Page, Editorial Director, and Joe Bonney, Executive Editor. Canadian Sailings was sold to management in 2010.

UBM sold the majority of its data business to Electra Partners in 2013, who formed AXIO Data Group. IHS Inc. announced in November 2014 that it had signed a definitive agreement to acquire JOC Group Inc.

In March 2022 Journal of Commerce becomes part of S&P Global through the latter's merger with IHS Markit.
