= Anna Youngman =

American economist and writer

- Youngman in 1922
- Died: 1974
- Education: University of Chicago
- Occupations: Economist, writer, professor
- Years active: 1908–1952
- Employer(s): Wellesley College, The Washington Post
- Notable work: The Economic Causes of Great Wealth

Anna P. Youngman (died 1974) was an American economist, writer and professor. After earning her doctorate in economics from the University of Chicago, she joined the faculty of Wellesley College. She later worked at the Federal Reserve Bank of New York, then became one of the first two women to work as an editorial writer for The Washington Post.

== Early life ==
Youngman was raised in Louisville, Kentucky by Mr. and Mrs. Charles Youngman. She graduated first in her high school class in 1901, winning a scholarship to attend the University of Chicago, where she earned a PhB in 1905 and PhD in 1908.

== Career ==
In 1908 she became Professor of Economics at Wellesley. In 1909, Youngman published The Economic Causes of Great Wealth, based on her doctoral dissertation by the same title. In it she contests the idea that such fortunes could be earned, outlining factors outside of personal ability that contribute to the amassing of wealth. A favorable review in The New York Times said, "Dr. Youngman may take her seat beside Ida Tarbell, who knows how to impress herself upon her times even without voting."

She later took leave from Wellesley to work at the Federal Reserve in New York. From 1924 to 1932, she was an editor at The Journal of Commerce. After Eugene Meyer resigned as Fed chair and bought The Washington Post in 1933, he hired Youngman as an editorial writer. She and Bett Hooper were the paper's first two women to serve in that capacity.

In 1945, while working at the Post, Youngman published The Federal System in Wartime, on the subject of the Federal Reserve's role in financing war production. She retired from the Post in 1952.

== Later life ==
As of 1954 she lived with her sister at the Marlyn Apartments in Washington, DC. Youngman died in 1974.
