= Bernard H. Ridder =

American newspaper publisher

- Born: March 20, 1883; New York City, United States
- Died: May 5, 1975 (aged 92); West Palm Beach, Florida, United States
- Education: Columbia University
- Occupation: Newspaper publisher
- Title: Chairman of Ridder Publications, Inc.
- Parent(s): Herman Ridder; Mary C. Amend
- Relatives: Victor F. Ridder (brother); Joseph E. Ridder (brother)

Bernard H. Ridder (March 20, 1883 – May 5, 1975) was an American newspaper publisher who was the chairman emeritus of Ridder Publications.

== Biography ==
Ridder was one of the sons of Herman Ridder, who founded the New York German-language newspaper Staats-Zeitung und Herold. He graduated from Columbia University in 1903 and joined the family paper shortly afterwards.

In 1915, he became the president of the family paper. In 1927, he and his brothers purchased The New York Journal of Commerce and The St. Paul Dispatch and The Pioneer Press.

In 1938, Ridder became publisher of The Dispatch and The Pioneer Press and was named president in 1952. In 1973, he was named chairman emeritus of Ridder Publications.

Ridder died on May 5, 1975, at 92 years old in West Palm Beach, Florida. He had three sons: Daniel Ridder, who served as publisher of the Press-Telegram; Joseph Ridder, who was publisher of The Mercury News, and Bernard Ridder Jr., who served as vice-chairman of Knight Ridder and was one of the original owners of the Minnesota Vikings.
