= Bernard J. Ridder =

American newspaperman and racehorse owner

- Born: June 29, 1913; New York City, United States
- Died: July 30, 1983 (aged 70); Huntington Beach, California, United States
- Education: Princeton University
- Occupation(s): Newspaper publisher, Thoroughbred racehorse owner/breeder
- Board member of: Ridder Publications, Inc., California Thoroughbred Breeders' Association
- Spouse: Georgia Buck (1914–2002)
- Children: 2
- Parent: Joseph E. Ridder & Hedwig Schneider
- Relatives: Herman Ridder (grandfather); Victor F. Ridder (uncle)

Bernard Joseph "Ben" Ridder (June 29, 1913 – July 29, 1983) was an American newspaper publisher who served as chairman of the board of directors of Ridder Publications, Inc. and an executive in the California Thoroughbred horse racing industry as well as a racehorse owner and breeder.

Ridder was born in New York City, one of eight grandsons of the newspaper magnate, Herman Ridder. His father, Joseph E. Ridder was chairman of the family's Ridder Publications, Inc.

Ben Ridder married Georgia Buck in 1936. They moved from their home on Long Island, New York in 1956 to California in order for him to take over as the publisher of the Pasadena Independent & Star News when Ridder Publications acquired the newspaper.

His granddaughter, Katie Ridder, is married to the architect Peter Pennoyer, a great-great-grandson of J. P. Morgan.

== Ridder Thoroughbred Stable ==
A few years after settling in California, Ben Ridder and his wife Georgia became owners of Thoroughbred racehorses. Some of their notable runners included Flying Paster, the winner of the Grade 1 Santa Anita and Hollywood Derbys and California Horse of the Year plus the Eclipse Award winner, Cascapedia.

Ben Ridder served as president of the California Thoroughbred Breeders' Association and in 1969 was a founding executive of the Oak Tree Racing Association, which operates the annual fall meet at Santa Anita Park.
