= Mendota Heights, Minnesota =

City in Minnesota, United States

Mendota Heights
- City
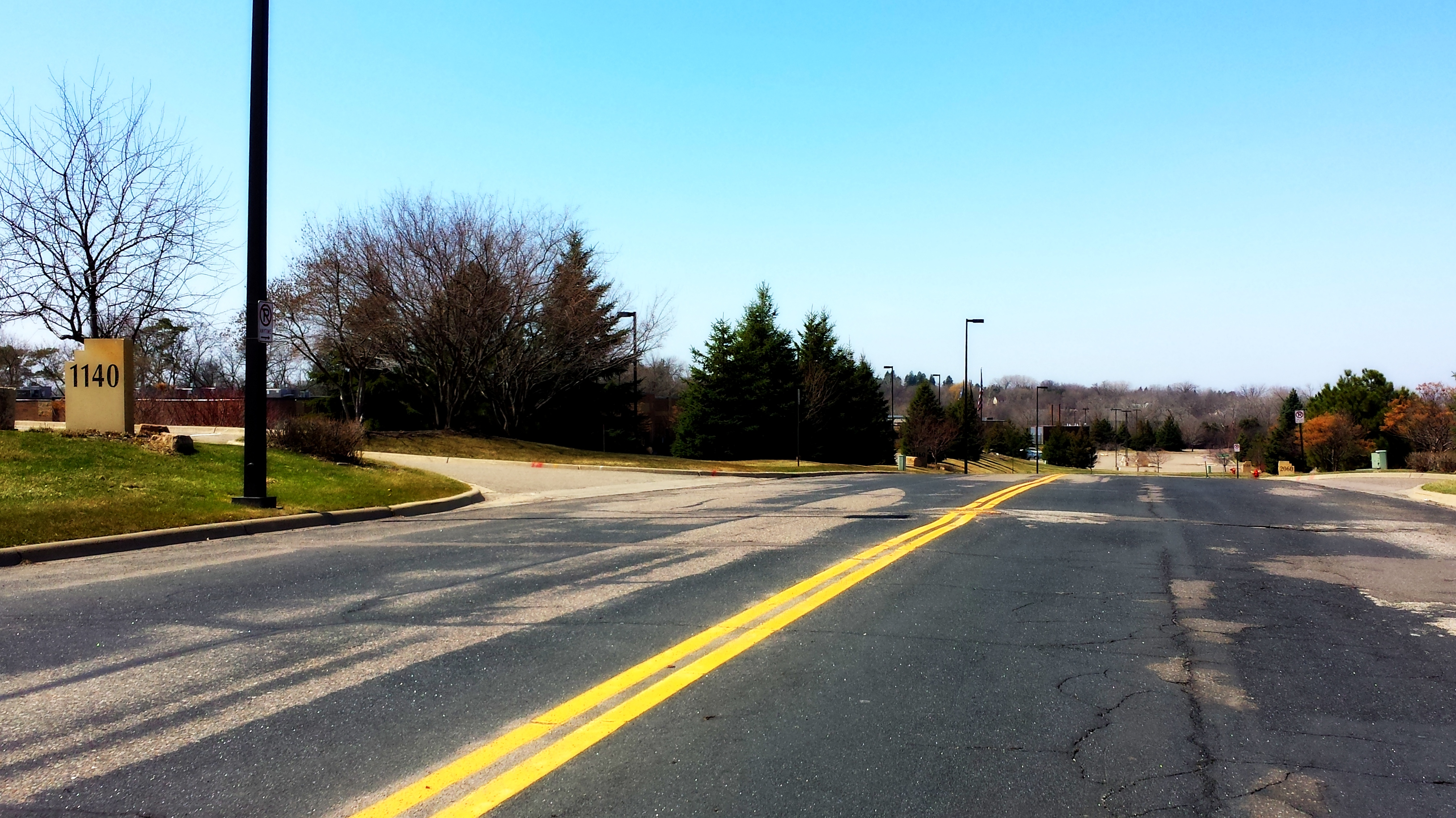
- Centre Point Boulevard in Mendota Heights
- Motto: "Between St.Paul And Minneapolis The Best Kept Secret"
- Location of the city of Mendota Heights within Dakota County, Minnesota
- Coordinates: 44°53′13″N 93°8′6″W
- Country: United States
- State: Minnesota
- County: Dakota

Area
  - Total: 10.05 sq mi (26.02 km^{2})
  - Land: 9.07 sq mi (23.50 km^{2})
  - Water: 0.97 sq mi (2.52 km^{2})
- Elevation: 912 ft (278 m)

Population (2020)
  - Total: 11,744
  - Density: 1,294.1/sq mi (499.66/km^{2})
- Time zone: UTC−6 (Central (CST))
  - Summer (DST): UTC−5 (CDT)
- ZIP codes: 55118, 55120
- Area code: 651
- FIPS code: 27-41696
- GNIS feature ID: 0647763
- Website: https://mendotaheightsmn.gov/

Mendota Heights (/mɛnˈdoʊtə/ men-DOH-tə) is a city in Dakota County, Minnesota, United States. It is a first-ring southern suburb of the Twin Cities. The population was 11,744 at the 2020 census.

== Geography ==
According to the United States Census Bureau, the city has an area of 10.12 square miles (26.21 km^{2}), of which 9.15 square miles (23.70 km^{2}) is land and 0.97 square miles (2.51 km^{2}) is water.

Interstate Highway 35E, Interstate Highway 494 and Minnesota Highways 55 and 62 are four of the main routes near the town.

== Demographics ==
Historical population
Census	Pop.	Note	%±
1860	454		—
1870	444		−2.2%
1880	741		66.9%
1890	741		0.0%
1900	813		9.7%
1910	823		1.2%
1920	757		−8.0%
1930	948		25.2%
1940	1,360		43.5%
1950	2,107		54.9%
1960	5,028		138.6%
1970	6,565		30.6%
1980	7,288		11.0%
1990	9,431		29.4%
2000	11,434		21.2%
2010	11,071		−3.2%
2020	11,744		6.1%
U.S. Decennial Census

=== 2020 census ===
As of the 2020 census, Mendota Heights had a population of 11,744. The median age was 48.9 years. 20.7% of residents were under the age of 18 and 25.5% of residents were 65 years of age or older. For every 100 females there were 93.8 males, and for every 100 females age 18 and over there were 91.2 males age 18 and over.

100.0% of residents lived in urban areas, while 0.0% lived in rural areas.

There were 4,787 households in Mendota Heights, of which 25.6% had children under the age of 18 living in them. Of all households, 61.5% were married-couple households, 12.8% were households with a male householder and no spouse or partner present, and 22.0% were households with a female householder and no spouse or partner present. About 25.6% of all households were made up of individuals and 14.1% had someone living alone who was 65 years of age or older.

There were 4,977 housing units, of which 3.8% were vacant. The homeowner vacancy rate was 0.7% and the rental vacancy rate was 3.7%.

Racial composition as of the 2020 census
Race	Number	Percent
White	10,420	88.7%
Black or African American	198	1.7%
American Indian and Alaska Native	33	0.3%
Asian	261	2.2%
Native Hawaiian and Other Pacific Islander	3	0.0%
Some other race	164	1.4%
Two or more races	665	5.7%
Hispanic or Latino (of any race)	482	4.1%

=== 2010 census ===
As of the census of 2010, there were 11,071 people, 4,378 households, and 3,204 families living in the city. The population density was 1,209.9 inhabitants per square mile (467.1/km^{2}). There were 4,620 housing units at an average density of 504.9 per square mile (194.9/km^{2}). The racial makeup of the city was 93.8% White, 1.5% African American, 0.2% Native American, 2.2% Asian, 0.6% from other races, and 1.8% from two or more races. Hispanic or Latino of any race were 2.9% of the population.

There were 4,378 households, of which 29.1% had children under the age of 18 living with them, 64.4% were married couples living together, 6.4% had a female householder with no husband present, 2.3% had a male householder with no wife present, and 26.8% were non-families. 22.3% of all households were made up of individuals, and 10.8% had someone living alone who was 65 years of age or older. The average household size was 2.51 and the average family size was 2.96.

The median age in the city was 47.5 years. 22.6% of residents were under the age of 18; 6.4% were between the ages of 18 and 24; 16.9% were from 25 to 44; 36.3% were from 45 to 64; and 17.7% were 65 years of age or older. The gender makeup of the city was 48.3% male and 51.7% female.

=== 2000 census ===
At the 2000 census, there were 11,434 people, 4,178 households and 3,237 families living in the town. The population density was 1,222.2 inhabitants per square mile (471.9/km^{2}). There were 4,252 housing units at an average density of 454.5 per square mile (175.5/km^{2}). The racial makeup of the town was 95.66% White, 0.88% African American, 0.17% Native American, 1.78% Asian, 0.46% from other races, and 1.04% from two or more races. Hispanic or Latino of any race were 1.78% of the population.

There were 4,178 households, of which 36.3% had children under the age of 18 living with them, 69.5% were married couples living together, 6.1% had a female householder with no husband present, and 22.5% were non-families. 18.9% of all households were made up of individuals, and 8.4% had someone living alone who was 65 years of age or older. The average household size was 2.72 and the average family size was 3.14.

Age distribution was 27.6% under the age of 18, 5.8% from 18 to 24, 22.7% from 25 to 44, 29.5% from 45 to 64, and 14.5% who were 65 years of age or older. The median age was 42 years. For every 100 females, there were 92.7 males. For every 100 females age 18 and over, there were 89.9 males.

The median income for a household in the town was $97,701 and the median income for a family was $103,204. Males had a median income of $61,095 versus $41,208 for females; the per capita income was $49,589. About 1.3% of families and 1.9% of the population were below the poverty line, including 0.9% of those under age 18 and 2.0% of those age 65 or over.

== Local government and politics ==
Mendota Heights was incorporated in 1956. It operates as a Plan A form of government under Minnesota law, with an elected mayor and four-member city council. The mayor's term of office is two years. City councilors are elected to staggered four-year terms.

Presidential election results

2020 Precinct Results Spreadsheet2016 Precinct Results Spreadsheet2012 Precinct Results Spreadsheet2008 Precinct Results Spreadsheet2004 Precinct Results Spreadsheet2000 Precinct Results Spreadsheet1996 Precinct Results1992 Precinct Results1988 Precinct Results1984 Precinct Results1980 Precinct Results1976 Precinct Results1968 Precinct Results1964 Precinct Results1960 Precinct Results
Year	Republican	Democratic	Third parties
2020	35.6% 3,114	62.3% 5,448	2.1% 187
2016	36.2% 2,871	55.2% 4,382	8.6% 680
2012	45.9% 3,718	52.6% 4,263	1.5% 127
2008	43.2% 3,467	55.1% 4,422	1.7% 133
2004	47.1% 3,700	52.2% 4,105	0.7% 52
2000	47.4% 3,462	46.9% 3,432	5.7% 416
1996	43.5% 2,898	48.5% 3,234	8.0% 537
1992	37.1% 2,479	42.2% 2,821	20.7% 1,378
1988	54.7% 2,938	45.3% 2,432	0.0% 0
1984	58.9% 2,788	41.1% 1,946	0.0% 0
1980	50.1% 2,219	36.7% 1,628	13.2% 584
1976	57.7% 2,270	39.7% 1,559	2.6% 102
1968	50.1% 1,388	47.4% 1,313	2.5% 68
1964	45.3% 1,076	54.5% 1,295	0.2% 6
1960	55.1% 1,278	44.8% 1,039	0.1% 3

== Economy ==
Businesses headquartered in Mendota Heights include:

- Patterson Companies
- Bellarcor, Esslinger & Co.
- Mayflower Distributing, Inc.

== Education ==
- Mendota Elementary (public, K-4)
- Somerset Elementary (public, K-4)
- Friendly Hills Middle School (public, 5–8)
- Two Rivers High School (public, 9–12)
- Convent of the Visitation (private, boys K-5, girls K–12)
- Saint Thomas Academy (private, boys 6–12)

== Notable people ==
- Matt Birk, Minnesota Vikings and Baltimore Ravens center
- Bree Fram, highest ranking transgender person in the United States Armed Forces
- David Hicks, basketball player in the Israeli Basketball Premier League
- Becky Holder, 2008 Summer Olympic Games equestrian
- Bert McKasy, Minnesota state legislator, lawyer, and businessman
- Justin Morneau, Minnesota Twins player and 2006 American League MVP
- T. J. Oshie, hockey player, Washington Capitals forward
- Robert and Kathleen Ridder, local philanthropists and businesspeople
- Kareem Rahma, comedian and artist
