= Joseph E. Ridder =

American newspaper publisher

- Born: April 4, 1886; New York City, United States
- Died: April 21, 1966 (aged 80); Long Island, United States
- Education: Columbia University
- Occupation: Newspaper publisher
- Board member of: Ridder Publications, Inc.
- Children: 4
- Parent(s): Herman Ridder; Mary C. Amend
- Relatives: Victor F. Ridder (brother); Bernard H. Ridder (brother)

Joseph Edward Ridder (April 4, 1886 – April 21, 1966) was an American newspaper publisher who was the chairman of Ridder Publications. He was the son of newspaper magnate Herman Ridder.

== Biography ==
Ridder was born on April 4, 1886, to Herman Ridder and his wife Mary C. Amend. Four years after he was born, his father became business manager of the New Yorker Staats-Zeitung. He attended De La Salle Institute with his twin brother Victor F. Ridder and graduated from Columbia College in 1907.

After graduating from Columbia, Ridder worked in the press room of the Staats-Zeitung, which his father recently acquired. Mechanically adept, Ridder helped his father design and invent the Intertype machine, which was marketed through the International Type-setting Machine Company. Ridder worked for Henry Ford until his father's death in 1915, when he rejoined his brothers at the family newspaper. He also served in the Motor Transport Corps during World War I.

After putting the newspaper on a sound financial footing, Ridder bought The Long Island Press in 1926. The same year, he and his brothers purchased the New York Journal of Commerce, the St. Paul Dispatch, and Pioneer Press. He later sold The Long Island Press to the Newhouse family in 1934.

During World War II, Ridder was staunchly pro-American and defended his family paper from accusations of pro-German sympathies. He became president and operating head of the Journal of Commerce and filed many dispatches from Germany after World War II. The family newspaper later extended to the Midwest and the West Coast, controlling 15 newspapers and several broadcasting companies. The Time magazine estimated the net worth of Ridder Publications to be at $15,000,000 in 1946 dollars.

He was a major contributor to the syndicate that defended the 1964 America's Cup against challengers. His son, Eric Ridder, was the skipper for Constellation, owned by the New York Yacht Club.

Ridder was a close friend of James Forrestal and worked with former United States Postmaster General James Farley on his 1936 Presidential Campaign. A former friend of Franklin D. Roosevelt, he broke with the president when he declared intentions to run for a third term. Nonetheless, he took a position on the United States Department of War's Price Renegotiation Board during World War II.

He was a member of India House, New York Yacht Club, University Club of New York.

== Personal life ==
Ridder married Hedwig Ottilia Schneider (1889-1960) in 1911 and after Schneider's death in 1960, married her half-sister, Irma Saltzseider (1899-1971). It was a second marriage for both, their previous spouses were deceased. He had two daughters and two sons, Olympic sailor and newspaper publisher Eric Ridder and Bernard J. Ridder, who was a publisher of The Pasadena Star-News. He died on April 20 at the Good Samaritan Hospital at 80 years old.
