= Port Import/Export Reporting Service =

Global trade intelligence company

PIERS
- Type: Division of S&P Global
- Industry: International Trade Data
- Headquarters: New York, New York
- Key people: Stuart Strachan, SVP, maritime & trade, IHS Markit; Wael Jarous, executive director; Guy Sear, executive director
- Products: Maritime Data
- Website: www.spglobal.com/marketintelligence/en/mi/industry/economics-country-risk.html

Port Import/Export Reporting Service (PIERS) is a trade information service offered by S&P Global Maritime Intelligence. Launched in the mid-1970s, PIERS is considered a pioneer in compiling digital data on global trade.

== Operations ==
PIERS gathers raw import Bills of Lading for all waterborne cargo vessels that enter and exit ports in the United States, sourced by U.S. Customs and Border Protection. Additionally, PIERS staff reporters manually collect export Bills of Lading from each port in the United States. These import and export records account for 17 million Bills of Lading collected by PIERS per year. The raw data is subsequently verified, analyzed, and synthesized with supplementary data sourced from The United Nations, United States Census, Dun & Bradstreet, and direct international country sources for use in PIERS trade intelligence tools. The synthesis of these multiple data sources forms the foundation for PIERS trade intelligence resources. PIERS also provides historical records dating from 1950 to the present.

== Products ==
PIERS trade intelligence tools are primarily used for market share and trend analysis, lead generation, fraud detection, to monitor contractual compliance, and to find buyers and suppliers. PIERS provides quantitative data pertaining to commodity details, including SIC and HS Codes, tonnage shipped, twenty-foot equivalent units (TEUs), and estimated values, as well as qualitative profiles on companies that import and export. In 2010, PIERS acquired CenTradeX, a provider of online trade intelligence tools for commodity trend analysis, statistical research, and lead prospecting.

PIERS serves multiple industries involved in importing and exporting, particularly the manufacturing, chemical, financial, and transportation industries, as well as several U.S. and foreign government agencies, and many ocean carriers. PIERS also periodically provides trade data for publications such as The Journal of Commerce, The New York Times, The Wall Street Journal, Bloomberg, and CNBC.
