= Franz Umbscheiden =

American journalist

Franz Umbscheiden (June 24, 1821 Grünstadt, Rhine Province - December 13, 1874 Newark, New Jersey) was a revolutionary during the revolutions of 1848 who emigrated to the United States (one of the Forty-Eighters) and became a journalist.

== Biography ==
Umbscheiden was educated at Heidelberg University and the Ludwig-Maximilians-Universität München, where he studied law and national economy. In 1848, he took an active part in revolutionary movements, traveling and making inflammatory speeches. One of his speeches on the death of Robert Blum resulted in him being compelled to flee to France. When the revolution began in Rhenish Bavaria, he returned, served in the army, and was present at the occupation of Worms and at the storming of Landau, after which he went to Baden under Gen. Franz Sigel, and afterward to Switzerland, where he became a private tutor. He was expelled from Switzerland to appease Louis Napoleon in 1852.

He went to Newark, New Jersey, and taught there. He married Philipina Schweitzer June 9, 1853. They had six children. During the Frémont canvass in 1856, he joined the Republican Party, but in 1859 he co-operated with the Democrats. From 1860 to 1864, he was on the staff of the New Yorker Staats-Zeitung; he left to establish the Newark Volksmann. In 1867 he was editor of the New Jersey Democrat, and he again edited the Volksmann in 1869–74.
