= Florida Keys Keynoter =

American broadsheet newspaper

- Type: Biweekly newspaper
- Format: Broadsheet
- Owner: The McClatchy Company
- Founder: Edgar Seney Jr.
- Editor: David Goodhue
- Founded: February 19, 1953
- Headquarters: Marathon, Florida
- Circulation: 14,000
- Website: flkeysnews.com

The Florida Keys Keynoter is a twice-weekly broadsheet format newspaper owned by The McClatchy Company and is a subsidiary of the Miami Herald. It primarily serves Monroe county in the U.S. state of Florida. In addition to publishing regular issues on Wednesday and Saturday, the Keynoter also publishes the quarterly magazine Unwind. The Keynoter is a partner of the Upper Keys Reporter, which specializes in coverage of the Upper Florida Keys, including Key Largo.

== History ==
The Keynoter was founded by Edgar Seney Jr., on February 19, 1953. Seney, a regular vacationer from his home state of Michigan, felt the Keys were missing a platform to inform residents about happenings and issues affecting the Florida Keys. Until that point, the only daily newspaper in the Florida Keys had been the Key West Citizen, which was and still is primarily concerned with events in Key West. Upon moving to the Florida Keys on a permanent basis, Seney began work on a newspaper that would eventually become the Keynoter.

The first issue was published from a small Marathon office operated by Seney, his wife, and half a dozen other workers. Initially published on a weekly basis, Seney accepted a college fellowship in 1955, selling the newspaper to Nicholas Mitchell, associate editor of the Greenville, South Carolina, newspaper.

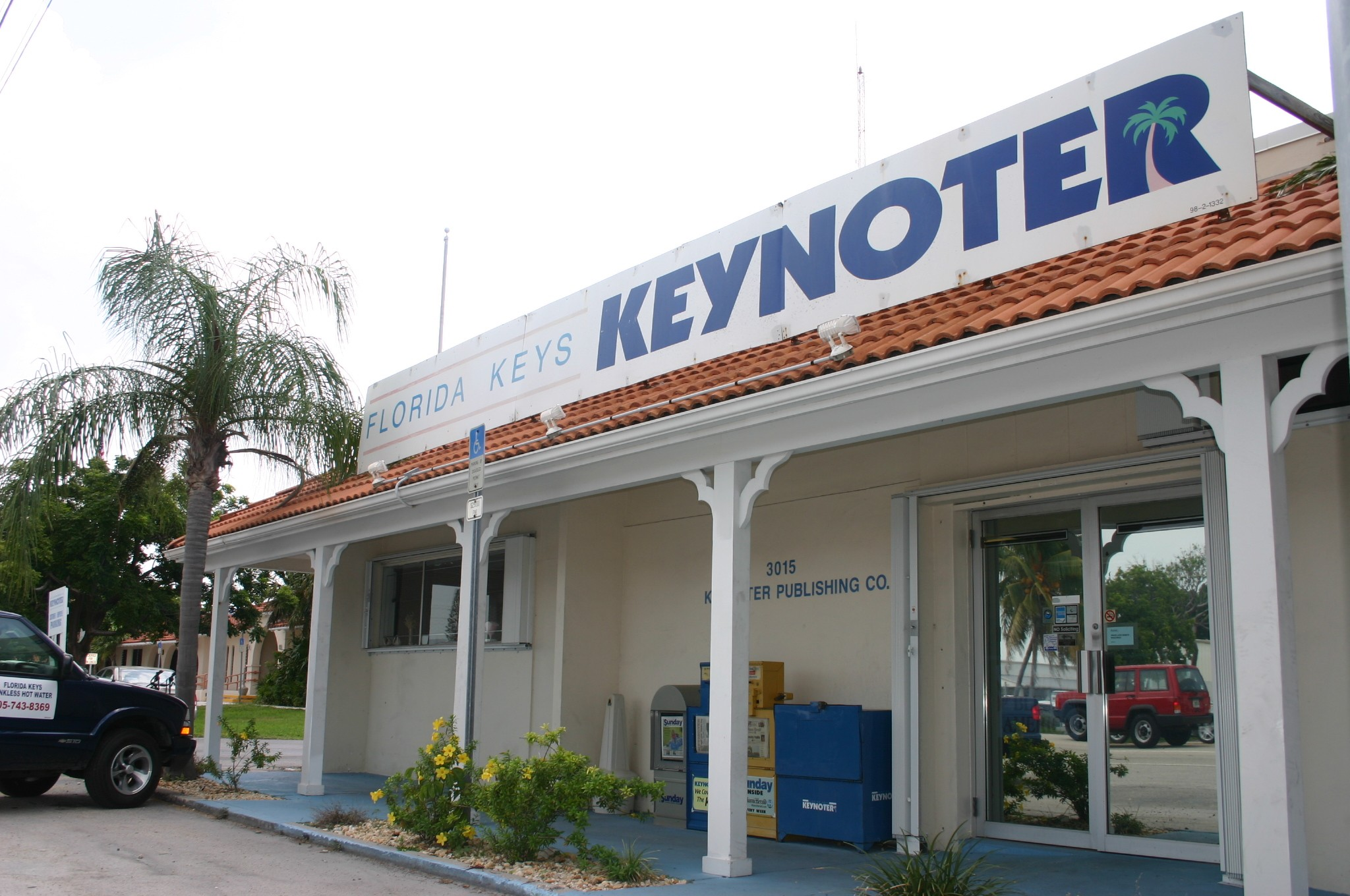
The Marathon offices of the Florida Keys Keynoter

In 1956, James L. Knight, one of the founders of the Knight-Ridder newspaper group, purchased the Keynoter. The Keynoter would remain a Knight-Ridder newspaper until 2006, when Knight-Ridder was purchased by rival newspaper group The McClatchy Company.

The Keynoter did not come into its own, however, until Hurricane Donna ravaged the Florida Keys in September 1960. In the wake of the destruction caused by the hurricane, and to better provide coverage of the devastation, the Keynoter temporarily merged resources with the Florida Keys Sun, a weekly newspaper located in Islamorada. The two newspapers published joint editions for three weeks until splitting once more. After only one month of separate operation, however, the two papers merged permanently under the Keynoter name.

The post-merger Keynoter operated an Upper Keys bureau in the former Sun offices until 1977, when the bureau was moved to Key Largo, where it today occupies the second floor of the Upper Keys Reporter building. In 1984, the Keynoter switched to a twice-weekly Wednesday and Saturday publication schedule under the motto "Everyone needs it twice a week." The Keynoter continues to use this publication schedule and motto today.

In 2000, the bi-weekly schedule was bolstered by the addition of L'Attitudes, a weekly arts and entertainment insert included in the Saturday edition of the Keynoter. Also in 2000, the Keynoter launched the Key West Keynoter, a Key West-oriented edition of the Keynoter, specifically written and designed to appeal to readers in Key West, the most populous city in the Florida Keys.

== Awards ==
In 2006 and 2007, Florida Monthly magazine named the Keynoter the best weekly newspaper in the state of Florida.

The Florida Keys Keynoter is also the only Florida newspaper, daily, weekly, or otherwise, to win the First Amendment Defense Award three separate times.
