= Minnesota Hockey =

Statewide governing body of amateur hockey in Minnesota

- Sport: Ice hockey
- Founded: 1947
- Founder: Robert Ridder
- No. of teams: 119 (approx.)
- Country: United States
- Website: www.minnesotahockey.org

Minnesota Hockey is the statewide governing body of amateur hockey in Minnesota and an affiliate of USA Hockey. Since 1947, Minnesota Hockey (formerly known as the Minnesota Amateur Hockey Association or MAHA) has been providing volunteer services for the development and promotion of all youth hockey in Minnesota. Robert Ridder was the founding president of the MAHA, and affiliated the state group with the Amateur Hockey Association of the United States.

== Districts ==
- District 1
  - Dino Mights
  - Edgcumbe Hockey Association
  - City of Lakes Youth Hockey Association
  - Langford Park Hockey
- District 2
  - Forest Lake
  - Highland/Central Hockey Association
  - Mahtomedi
  - Mounds View
  - North St. Paul
  - Roseville
  - Stillwater
  - Tartan
  - White Bear Lake
- District 3
  - Armstrong/Cooper Youth Hockey New Hope
  - Crow River
  - Hopkins
  - Minneapolis Storm
  - Mound/Westonka
  - North Metro Youth Hockey
  - Orono
  - Osseo/Maple Grove Hockey Association
  - St. Louis Park
  - Wayzata
- District 4
  - Fairmont
  - Luverne
  - Marshall
  - Redwood Falls, Minnesota
  - Sleepy Eye, Minnesota
  - Windom
  - Worthington
- District 5
  - Becker/Big Lake
  - Buffalo
  - Hutchinson
  - Litchfield/Dassel/Cokato
  - Richmond
  - Sartell
  - Sauk Rapids
  - St. Cloud
  - St. Michael/Albertville
  - Monticello/Annandale/ Maple Lake
  - Willmar
- District 6
  - Bloomington Jefferson
  - Bloomington Kennedy
  - Burnsville
  - Chaska
  - Eastview
  - Eden Prairie
  - Edina
  - Minnetonka
  - Prior Lake/Savage
  - Richfield
  - Shakopee
  - Waconia
- District 8
  - Apple Valley
  - Cottage Grove
  - Dodge County
  - Eagan
  - Eastview Hockey Association
  - Farmington
  - Hastings
  - Inver Grove Heights
  - Johnson/Como HOckey Association
  - Lakeville
  - Rosemount
  - Sibley Area Youth Hockey
  - South St. Paul
  - Woodbury
- District 9
  - Albert Lea
  - Austin
  - Dodge County Youth Hockey
  - Faribault
  - La Crescent
  - Mankato
  - Montgomery
  - New Ulm
  - Northfield
  - Owatonna
  - Red Wing
  - Rochester
  - St. Peter
  - Waseca
  - Winona
- District 10
  - Andover
  - Anoka
  - Blaine
  - Cambridge/Isanti
  - Circle Pines
  - Champlin Park
  - Chisago Lakes
  - Coon Rapids
  - Elk River
  - Hinckley
  - Mora
  - North Branch
  - Pine City
  - Princeton
  - Rogers
  - Spring Lake Park
  - St. Francis
- District 11
  - Carlton
  - Cook County
  - Duluth
  - Carlton
  - Hermantown
  - Moose Lake
  - Proctor
  - Silver Bay
  - Saginaw
  - Two Harbors
- District 12
  - Ely
  - Eveleth
  - Grand Rapids
  - Coleraine
  - Hibbing/Chisholm
  - International Falls
  - Hoyt Lakes
  - Virginia
- District 15
  - Alexandria
  - Benson
  - Brainerd
  - Crosby/Ironton/Aitkin
  - Detroit Lakes
  - Fergus Falls
  - Walker
  - Little Falls
  - Long Prairie
  - Moorhead
  - Morris
  - Park Rapids
  - Pequot Lakes
  - Perham
  - Sauk Centre
  - Wadena
- District 16
  - Bagley
  - Bemidji
  - Blackduck
  - Crookston
  - East Grand Forks
  - Hallock
  - Baudette
  - Red Lake Falls
  - Roseau
  - Thief River Falls
  - Warroad

== Disabled Hockey ==
Minnesota Hockey also governs Disabled Hockey.

- Sled Hockey
- Special Hockey
- Amputee Hockey

== CCM High Performance Program ==
The CCM High Performance Program (A.K.A HP) is a Minnesota Hockey and USA Hockey program designed to identify the best players ages 14-18 and provide top players in each section or district with an opportunity to play against the top players in their area and the state.

The Spring High Performance program, referred to as select teams throughout other parts of the country, allows the top players from each section or district to participate in festivals for chances to receive invites to the MNHP Summer Camp, HP Goalie and Shooting Camp, and the USA Hockey National Development camp.

The MNHP Tier 1 and Prospects league is a fall development league featuring an emphasis on local training and a minimum of 15 games against top competition from Minnesota and across the country. The season ends with a playoff where the top 3 Tier 1 teams and Shattuck-Saint Mary's School will participate in a 4-team playoff to determine who represents Minnesota at the Chipotle-USA Hockey National Championships. The Prospects league also boasts a playoff where the winning team will represent Minnesota at the Tier II National Championships.
