= Georgia B. Ridder =

American thoroughbred racehorse owner

- Born: December 5, 1914; Baltimore, Maryland; United States
- Died: June 14, 2002 (aged 87); Pasadena, California
- Education: Ethel Walker School
- Occupation: Thoroughbred racehorse owner
- Spouse: Bernard J. Ridder
- Children: Bernard Jr., Michael
- Parent(s): Laurance Buck & Mary Elizabeth Pue

Georgia Ridder (December 5, 1914 – June 14, 2002) was an American thoroughbred racehorse owner and a member of the board of directors of the Oak Tree Racing Association.

== Biography ==
Born Georgia Buck in Baltimore, Maryland, she attended Ethel Walker School in Simsbury, Connecticut. She married Bernard J. Ridder, co-founders and operators of the Knight Ridder newspaper chain. The couple made their home on Long Island, New York until 1955 when they moved to Pasadena, California where her husband took over as publisher of the Pasadena Independent & Star News.

Active in Pasadena culture, Georgia Ridder was a member of the board of directors of the Pasadena Art Museum and the Pasadena Symphony Association.

== Ridder Thoroughbred Stable ==
A few years after settling in California, Georgia and Ben Ridder became owners of Thoroughbred racehorses. Some of their notable runners included Flying Paster, the winner of the Grade 1 Santa Anita and Hollywood Derbys and California Horse of the Year plus the 1977 Eclipse Award winner, Cascapedia.

Following her husband's death in 1983, Georgia Ridder continue to operate their stable. She owned the 165-acre (0.67 km^{2}) Hidden Springs Ranch in Mountain Center in the San Jacinto Mountains and enjoyed considerable further success highlighted by Cat's Cradle being voted California Horse of the Year in 1995 and Alphabet Soup's win in the 1996 Breeders' Cup Classic.

Georgia Ridder died at her Pasadena home in 2002 at age eighty-seven.
