= Kathleen Ridder =

American philanthropist, educator, writer, and feminist (1922–2017)

- Born: October 2, 1922; New York City, US
- Died: April 3, 2017 (aged 94); Lantana, Florida, US
- Education: University of Minnesota Duluth
- Known for: Philanthropist, educator, writer, feminist
- Spouse: Robert Ridder

Kathleen Culman Ridder (October 2, 1922 – April 3, 2017) was an American philanthropist, educator, writer, and feminist. She graduated from University of Minnesota Duluth as a teacher, advocated for women's athletic programs at the University of Minnesota, and was a benefactor of Minnesota Golden Gophers women's ice hockey. She was active in Republican politics, supported the Equal Rights Amendment, and later turned to writing and philanthropy to help her causes. She was married to Robert Ridder, and is a namesake of the Ridder Arena.

== Early life ==
Ridder was born Kathleen Marie Culman on October 2, 1922, in New York City. Her father was a stockbroker who went broke during the Great Depression, and her mother worked in a dress shop to support the household. Ridder was active in sports in her youth, attended the all-girls Brearley School, and later went to Smith College. After college she married Robert Ridder, who was a member of the family which founded Knight Ridder media company, and moved with him to Minnesota in 1943. She resided in Duluth with her husband while she completed a teacher's degree at the University of Minnesota Duluth, then relocated to Saint Paul.

== Activism ==
Ridder dedicated her life to fighting for women's access to opportunities in education and athletics, that she did not have as a young lady who grew up before Title IX came into effect. Ridder felt that supporting women's athletics was a means to help women succeed in life, and in the business world. She volunteered on the boards of non-profit organizations, and multiple committees at the University of Minnesota while being an advocate for women.

Ridder supported the Republican Party, embraced civil and political rights, was opposed to United States involvement in the Vietnam War, supported legalized abortion in the United States, LGBT rights in the United States, and the proposed Equal Rights Amendment at the 1980 Republican National Convention. Ridder befriended Rosalie E. Wahl as the first female on the Minnesota Supreme Court, funded a book about Wahl and a Twin Cities Public Television documentary about Wahl. Ridder collaborated with Marlene Johnson in 1982 to set up the Minnesota Women's Campaign Fund, in an effort to encourage more women in political office.

Ridder's other involvement included serving on the Metropolitan Council, the Minnesota State Board of Human Rights, the Saint Paul Urban League, and the Minnesota Foundation Board of Trustees. She also sat on the board of trustees for the William Mitchell College of Law, and the accreditation committee for the American Bar Association.

== Philanthropy ==
In 1983, Ridder established the first endowment awarded to a female student-athlete at the University of Minnesota, known as the Kathleen C. Ridder scholarship for studies in math, medicine, or science. The University of Minnesota also awards the "Kathleen C. and Robert B. Ridder Scholarship" annually to a student athlete on the Golden Gophers women's ice hockey team.

Ridder and her husband helped build the first women's-only college ice hockey facility, and which became the Ridder Arena, home to the Minnesota Golden Gophers women's ice hockey. The Ridders gifted $500,000 towards the project which opened in 2002, and remained the sole facility dedicated to college women's ice hockey until the Wisconsin Badgers opened LaBahn Arena in 2010. Robert Ridder died in 2000 before the arena's completion, but Kathleen Ridder attended the opening night and dropped the ceremonial first puck.

== Publications ==
Ridder authored a total of seven books and articles, including three autobiographical books of her life:

Books

- Kathleen Incorporated. (1990). Privately published.
- A Woman Ahead of her Time. (1995). Privately published.
- Shaping My Feminist Life: A Memoir. (1998). Minnesota Historical Society Press.
- Stories by Minnesota women in sports: Leveling the playing field. (2005). North Star Press

Articles

- Kathleen C. Ridder papers, 1978–1985. Minnesota Historical Society.
- The Women's Institute and how it revived downtown St. Paul: Speakers, style shows, and 12,000 shoppers. (1997).
- A win at Wimbledon in 1959; Links, courts, lanes, diamonds: Ramsey County's women athletes and their history of success. (1998).

== Later life ==
Ridder was married to Robert for 56 years, until his death in 2000. She moved to Lantana, Florida in 2008, later volunteered as a hospice worker, funded exhibits at the South Florida Science Center and Aquarium for water quality and restoring the Everglades, and funded educational programs operated by the League of Women Voters in Palm Beach, Florida. She died at home on April 3, 2017.

== Honors and awards ==
Ridder was inducted into the University of Minnesota M Club Hall of Fame in 1990 as a benefactor, and received the Director's Award in 2004 in recognition of her generosity and service to the Minnesota Golden Gophers sports programs. The American Hockey Coaches Association recognized Ridder and her late husband in 2009 with the Joe Burke Award, for dedication to women's ice hockey.
