= Aberdeen American News =

Newspaper from South Dakota

- "Worth Looking Into"

- Front page on February 19, 2026
- Type: Daily newspaper
- Format: Broadsheet
- Owner: Lee Enterprises
- Founder(s): C.W. Starling; Paul S. Ware
- Editor: Alice Mannette
- Founded: 1885
- Language: English
- Headquarters: Aberdeen, South Dakota, United States
- Circulation: 12,779 (as of 2015)
- Website: aberdeennews.com

Aberdeen American News is a newspaper in Aberdeen, South Dakota, published by Lee Enterprises. It is published five days a week, Tuesday through Saturday.

== History ==
In 1885, C.W. Starling and Paul S. Ware founded the weekly Aberdeen News. In 1886, Starling bought out Ware, and then sold a half-interest to E.C. Torrey. In 1889, George Schlosser bought Starling's controlling interest for $15,000 and assumed management. In 1892, Schlosser resigned as editor, and was soon succeeded by C.J. McLeod.

In 1906, a rival paper called the Aberdeen Daily American was launched. In 1909, John H. McKeever joined A.A. Pickler and J.K. Kutrewsky as co-owners. A year later McKeever bought out Pickler, and Kutrewsky soon after. In 1914, E.P. Neill became American co-owner. Five years later the two came to an agreement with McLeod of the Evening News after running into him at a Rotary Club luncheon.

In October 1919, the News and American merged to form the American News. In 1923, the paper bought and absorbed the Aberdeen Journal. In 1928, the Ridder family purchased the paper. In 1974, Ridder Publications and Knight Newspapers merged to form Knight Ridder.

In 2006, the company was acquired by McClatchy, which then sold the American News to Schurz Communications. In 2019, Schurz sold all its papers to GateHouse Media. Later that year the company merged with Gannett. In 2020, the paper's printing plant ceased and production moved to Sioux Falls. In 2025, Gannett was renamed to USA Today Co. In 2026, Lee Enterprises acquired the paper.

== Market ==
Aberdeen is three hours from Fargo, North Dakota, and Sioux Falls, South Dakota, and about five hours from Minneapolis–Saint Paul. The market area, known as the Dakota Midland, is based primarily on agriculture. Hundreds of family-owned farms and small communities dot the Northern Plains. Aberdeen is the largest community within a 150-mile (240 km) radius.
