= Long Island Daily Press =

Former US newspaper (1821–1977)

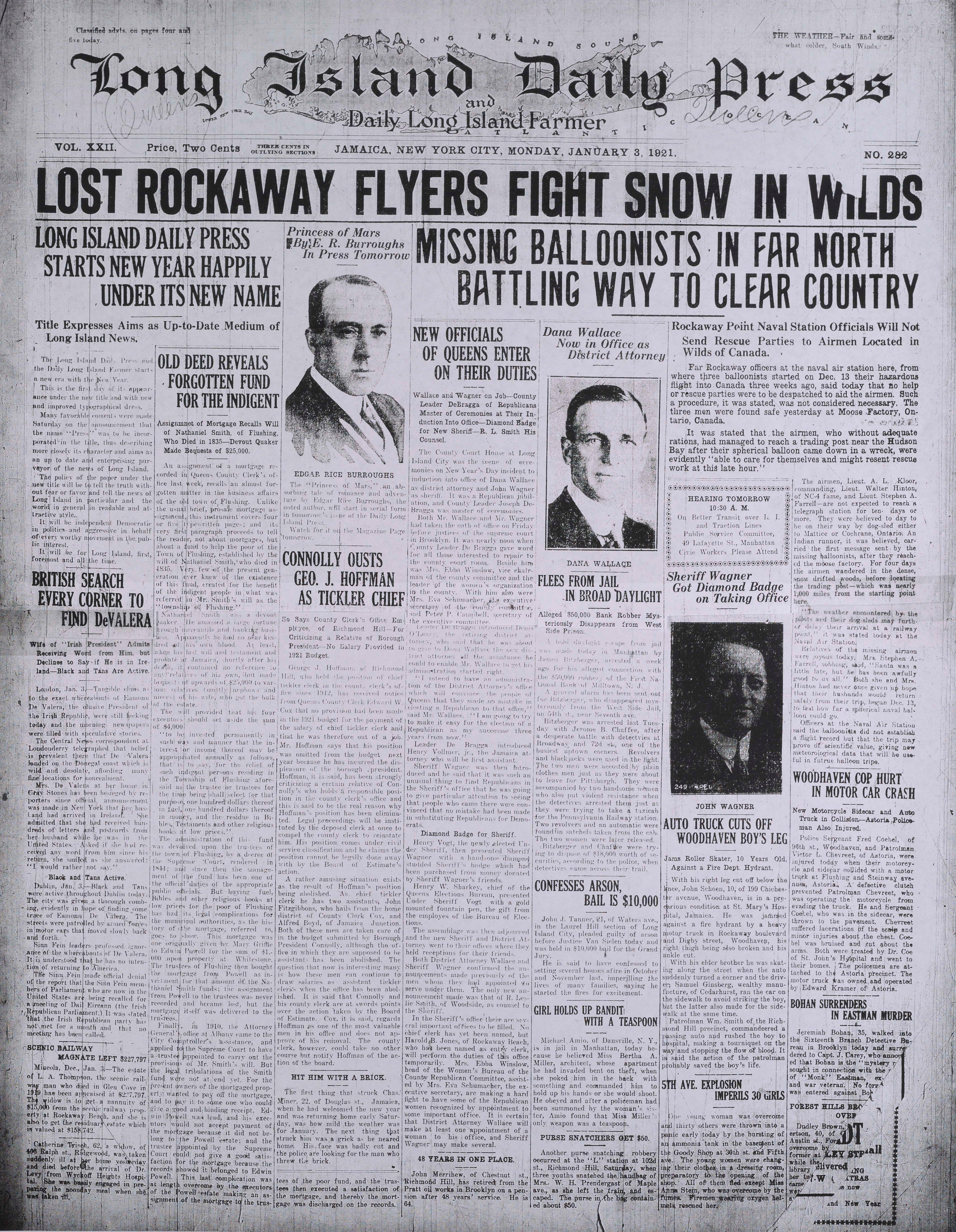
- photo of first Long Island Daily Press newspaper
- Type: Daily newspaper
- Owner: Advance Publications (1932-1977)
- Founder: Henry C. Sleight
- Founded: 1821; 205 years ago
- Ceased publication: March 25, 1977
- Language: English
- City: Jamaica, Queens, New York
- Country: United States

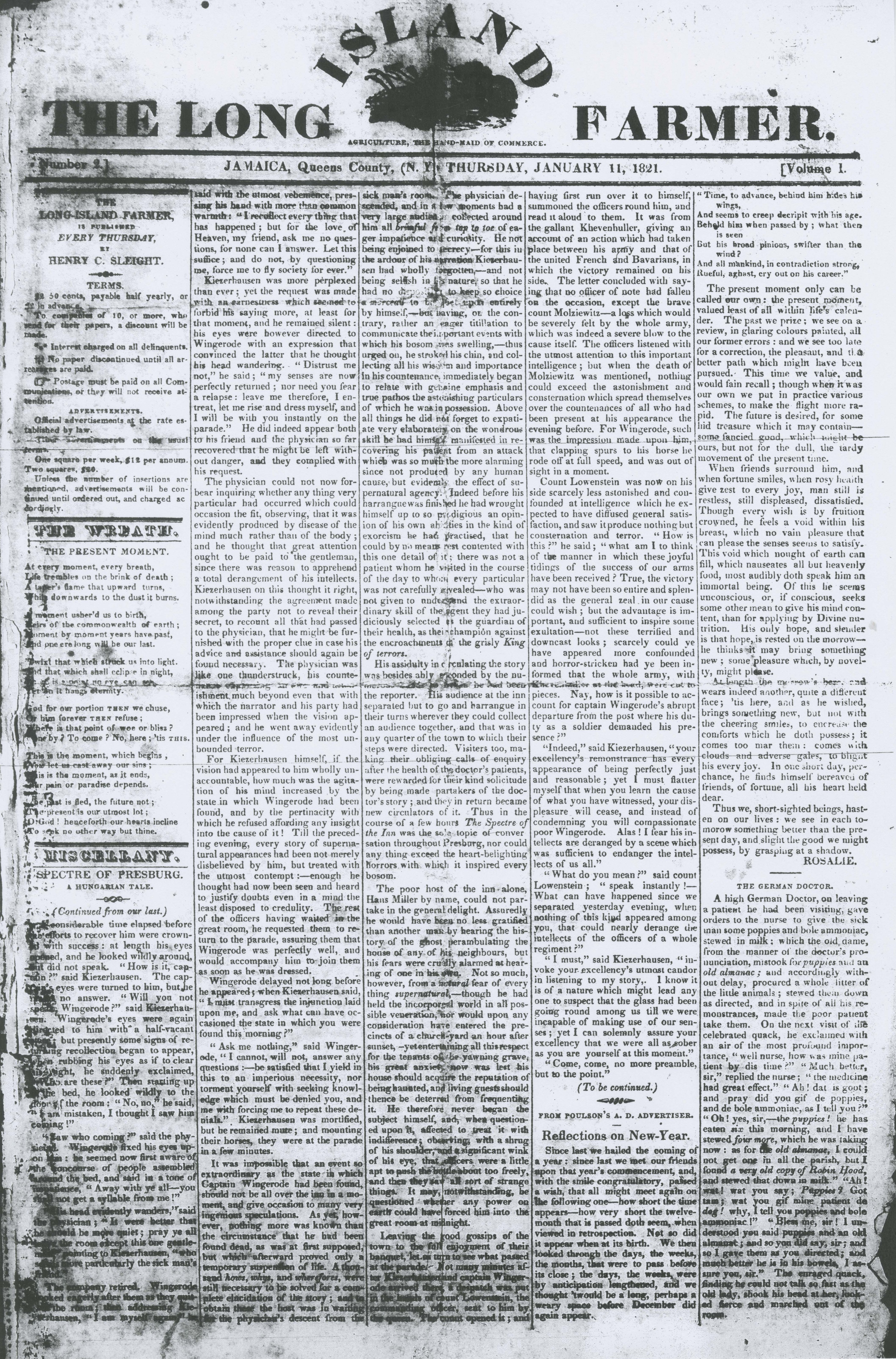
photo of first Long Island Farmer newspaper

The Long Island Daily Press was a daily newspaper that was published in Jamaica, Queens. It was founded in 1821 as the Long Island Farmer. The paper’s founder, Henry C. Sleight, was born in New York City in 1792, and raised in Sag Harbor, Long Island. Sleight got his start as a newspaperman when he worked on the staff of the Suffolk County Gazette, a weekly newspaper published in Sag Harbor. During the War of 1812 Sleight enlisted in the army and saw action on the Kentucky frontier. After the war he remained in Kentucky for a few years, during which time he published another weekly newspaper, the Messenger, and later went into the mercantile business. After suffering heavy business losses due to a fire, Sleight returned to New York and settled in Jamaica, where he established the Long Island Farmer.

The Long Island Farmer began as a weekly newspaper, publishing its first issue on January 4, 1821. It continued, sometimes as a weekly and sometimes bi-weekly, under Sleight’s successors Thomas Bradley, Isaac F. Jones and Charles S. Watrous. In the 1880s the paper came under the ownership of John C. Kennehan, a farmer and printer who had been in charge of the Brooklyn Daily Eagle's Long Island Department. At the time Kennehan became its owner, the Farmer’s offices were located on the west side of Herriman Avenue (now 161st Street) in Jamaica. Kennehan was still the paper’s editor in 1898, when Queens County was partitioned, with the western portion of the original county (including Jamaica) becoming part of Greater New York City, while the eastern portion became present-day Nassau County. In response to these changes, Kennehan began to change the Farmer's format and approach to bring it into line with Queens’ new role as part of an emerging metropolis. After Kennehan’s death his nephew James F. Sullivan took over as the Farmer's owner, but after some setbacks he sold his interest in the paper to James O’Rourke.

In 1912 the Long Island Farmer absorbed the Long Island Democrat, Jamaica’s other weekly newspaper. At the same time the Farmer became a daily newspaper. In 1920 a Jamaica lawyer named Benjamin Marvin became the Farmer's sole owner. At the start of the following year the newspaper changed its name to the Long Island Daily Press and Farmer.

In June 1926 the Long Island Press and Farmer was acquired by the Ridder Brothers, owners of New York’s German-language newspaper, the Staats-Zeitung. The Ridders shortened the paper’s name to the Long Island Press and appointed William F. Hofmann as its publisher. During Hoffman’s tenure the Press built a new printing plant and offices at 92-24 168th Street, south of Jamaica Avenue. The first papers were printed in the new building on September 17, 1931. In February of the following year Hoffman launched a Sunday edition, the Long Island Sunday Press.

Later in 1932 the Ridders sold their controlling interest in the Press to Samuel I. Newhouse, who also owned the Staten Island Advance. In June 1938, Newhouse acquired the Press' main competitor, the Long Island Daily-Star Journal. In the years that followed, many stories and photographs that appeared in the Press would also appear in the Star-Journal. The Newhouse family would continue to publish the Star-Journal until 1968 and the Press until 1977.

Under Newhouse’s ownership the Press began to expand its coverage eastward, first to Nassau and then to Suffolk County. In 1932 the Press' daily circulation was less than 30,000. By 1952 that number had climbed to 157,000. With the arrival of the post-war boom in Queens, Nassau and Suffolk the Press' circulation continued to rise, reaching an all-time high of 445,000 daily and 422,000 Sunday in 1969. But with the economic decline of the 1970s many of the stores and other local businesses that the Press depended on for advertising sales either closed or cut their advertising budgets. At the same time the Press began losing circulation, particularly in Nassau and Suffolk Counties, as other New York daily papers expanded their suburban coverage, and their primary Nassau-Suffolk competitor, Newsday, improved quality, increased circulation and added a Sunday edition. On March 25, 1977 the Long Island Press ceased publication, citing increasing costs, decreased advertising revenue and declining circulation. The old Long Island Press building stood unoccupied on 168th Street until 2005, when it was demolished to make way for the Home Depot store that currently occupies the site.

The Archives (formerly the Long Island Division) at the Queens Library has microfilm of the Long Island Daily Press from 1921 to 1977, and of the Long Island Farmer from 1821 to 1920. The Queens Library Archives also has a collection of approximately 3,600 photographs from the Long Island Daily Press photo morgue. The Levittown Public Library in Nassau County has microfilm of the Long Island Daily Press from 1944 to 1977.
