= Ridder Arena =

Indoor ice rink in Minnesota

Coordinates: 44.9785°N 93.2293°W

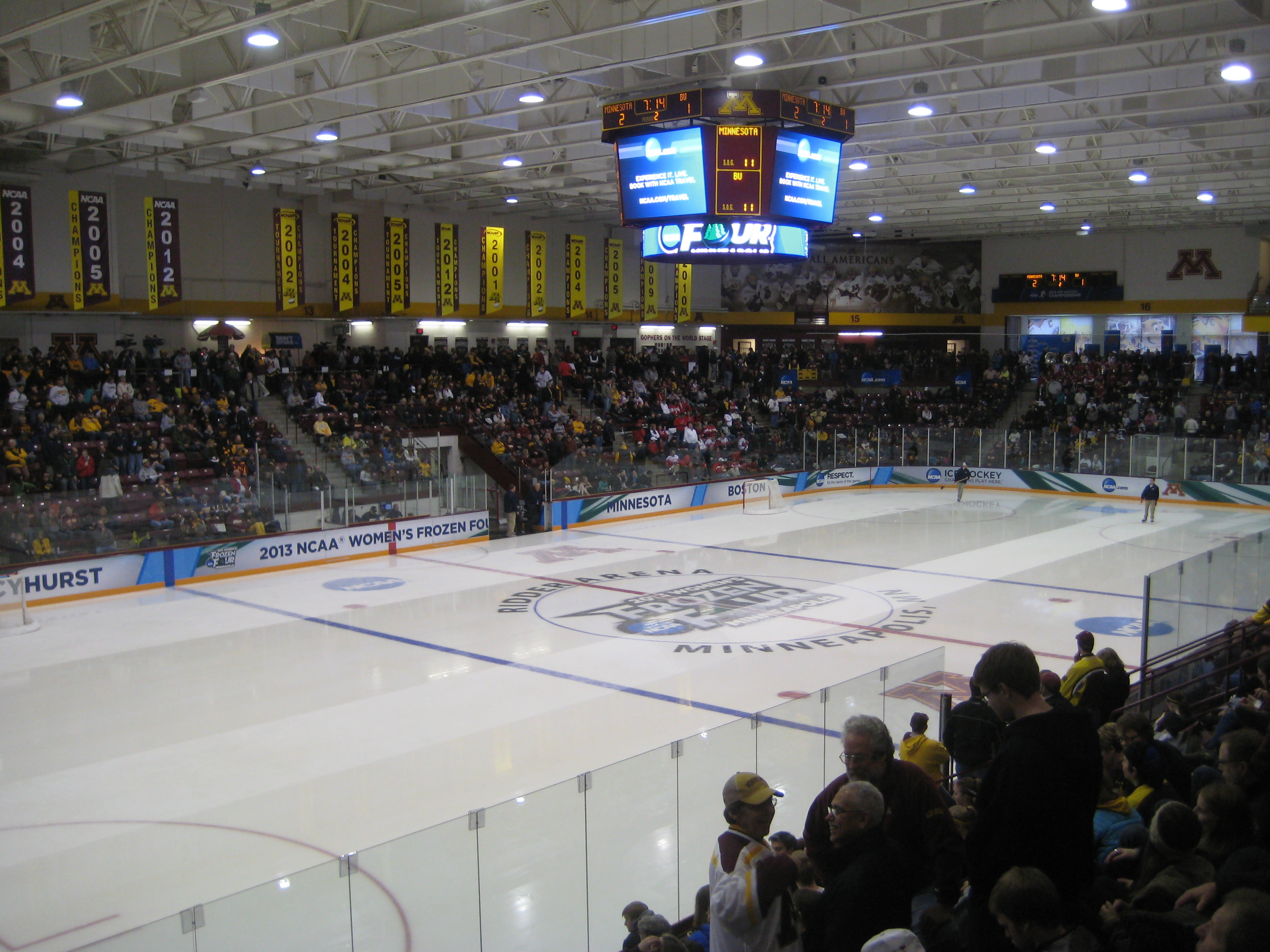

- Location in Minnesota Location in the United States
- Location: 1901 4th St. SE; Minneapolis, MN 55455
- Owner: University of Minnesota
- Operator: University of Minnesota
- Capacity: 3,400
- Surface: 200' x 85'

Construction
- Opened: 2002
- Architects: Rossetti Architects; Ankeny Kell Architects

Tenant
- Minnesota Golden Gophers Women's Hockey (NCAA) (2002–present)

Ridder Arena is an indoor ice rink at the University of Minnesota, and home to the Minnesota Golden Gophers women's ice hockey team. The arena is adjacent to the men's 3M Arena at Mariucci. It was completed in 2002, and includes the connected Baseline Tennis Center for the men's and women's tennis teams. It was the first facility in the United States built specifically for college women's ice hockey, and has hosted the NCAA Women's Frozen Four on four occasions. The arena is named for benefactors Robert Ridder and Kathleen Ridder.

== Background ==
Planning for Ridder Arena began in the mid-1990s due to growth of the Minnesota Golden Gophers women's ice hockey program, and the need for a second arena on the University of Minnesota campus. Local businessman Robert Ridder co-chaired a task force to build a rink for the women's team, but he died in 2000 before the completion of the project. Funding for the new arena was approved in 1999, and included contributions from the Minnesota Legislature, university fundraising, and other private donations. Ridder and his wife, Kathleen, donated $500,000 towards the project, and additional money came from "Wilson's Way", a fundraising initiative by Gary Wilson, coach of the women's cross country team. The design of the facility was a collaboration between Rossetti Architects and Ankeny Kell, with construction completed by Shaw Lundquist Associates.

== Description ==
Ridder Arena is located on the Minneapolis campus of the University of Minnesota near Dinkytown, and was built directly adjacent to 3M Arena at Mariucci on its west side. The arena has seating capacity for 3,400 spectators, which includes club seating for 200, and nine luxury boxes. The playing surface is National Hockey League (NHL) size, measuring 85 feet wide, by 200 feet long. Ridder Arena is connected to 3M Arena at Mariucci by a tunnel to allow sharing of an ice resurfacer and a refrigeration system. The same tunnel includes, a locker room specific to the women's team, coaches' offices, referees' rooms, and public change rooms. The facility also included a 5,000-square-foot strength training and aerobic conditioning area specific for the women's team.

The university operates several parking facilities in the vicinity of the arena, shared with its other nearby sports facilities. Within several blocks is the East Bank station and Stadium Village station on the Metro Green Line light rail, and the U of M Transitway busway. Metro Transit operates bus routes 2 and 6, passing by the arena on 4th Street SE.

The Baseline Tennis Center is attached to Ridder Arena on its west side and is the largest portion of the complex. It is home to the Minnesota Golden Gophers men's and women's tennis teams, who previously had no dedicated facility of their own. According to the architects Ankeny Kell, the joint project was "brought on by the economies of scale and site considerations". The tennis center includes 12 outdoor tennis courts, 10 indoor tennis courts, a complete tennis professional shop, and received the municipal facility of the year award from the Tennis Industry magazine.

== History ==
Ridder Arena was the first facility in the United States to be constructed specifically for college women's hockey, and the only such facility until LaBahn Arena was built for the Wisconsin Badgers women's ice hockey team in 2010. As of 2018, it remains just one of two arenas built for a college women's ice hockey program. The first game was played on October 19, 2002, attended by 3,239 spectators. Kathleen Ridder attended the first game to drop the ceremonial first puck. The team set its attendance record with a sold out crowd of 3,400 on March 24, 2013.

The University of Minnesota has taken advantage of having an NHL-sized rink at Ridder, and an Olympic-sized rink at Mariucci for training and practicing needs, depending on upcoming opponents. Women's team coach Laura Halldorson felt that having a smaller and more intimate arena created a better atmosphere for home games and an energetic environment, instead of playing in the much larger Mariucci arena to the same size crowd. In the 16 years that the women's team has played at Ridder Arena, the team has won 12 conference titles, and six national titles. Ridder Arena hosted the NCAA Women's Frozen Four on five occasions, in 2010, 2013, 2015, 2018, and 2025. (Note: Ridder Arena hosted the NCAA Women's Ice Hockey Tournament in 2010, 2013, 2015, and 2018. Ridder Arena hosted the NCAA Women's Ice Hockey Tournament in 2025.) The Golden Gophers won the NCAA Women's Frozen Four at home in 2013, and 2015.

Ridder Arena has hosted the Western Collegiate Hockey Association conference championships on ten occasions, in 2004, 2005, 2006, 2007, 2009, 2010, 2011, 2013, 2016, and 2017. It has also hosted the Minnesota Girls State Hockey Tournament, and been used as a practice venue for visiting NHL teams and the IIHF U18 Women's World Championship.

In 2010, the University of Minnesota did its own study on energy conservation at Ridder Arena and the Baseline Tennis Center. Changes were made in the airflow supply when events were not scheduled, resulting in a reduction of 17% of annual energy costs.

== Notes ==
Sporting positions
Preceded by Herb Brooks Arena; Androscoggin Bank Colisée	Host of the Division III men's Frozen Four; 2011; 2015	Succeeded by Herb Brooks Arena; Herb Brooks Arena
