= Victor F. Ridder =

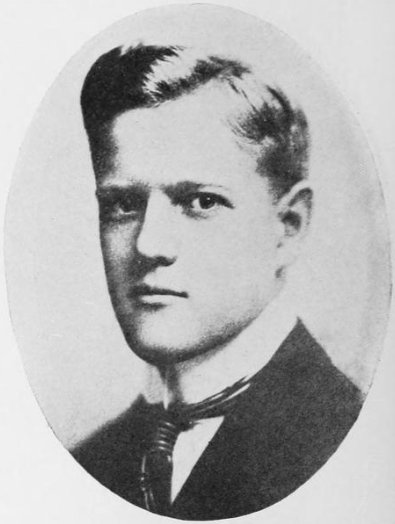
- Born: Victor Frank Ridder; April 4, 1886; New York, New York, US
- Died: June 14, 1963 (aged 77); New York, New York, US
- Occupation(s): Newspaper publisher, civic leader
- Spouses: Marie Thompson (m. 1911; died 1935) Ruth O'Day (m. 1937)
- Children: 6, including Robert Ridder

Victor Frank Ridder (April 4, 1886 – June 14, 1963) was a newspaper publisher and civic leader in New York City for many decades.

== Early life and career ==
Victor F. Ridder was born in New York City on April 4, 1886. He and his brothers Bernard H. Ridder and Joseph E. Ridder were the owners and publishers of the New Yorker Staats-Zeitung, the premier daily newspaper of German-speaking residents of the New York City area, which they had inherited from their father Herman Ridder.

His company, founded by his father, Ridder Publications, Inc., later merged with Knight Newspapers, Inc. in 1974, and operated under the name Knight Ridder until 2006, when the company was purchased by The McClatchy Company.

=== Philanthropy and volunteering ===
Victor Ridder was active in the Boy Scouts of America as a volunteer leader in New York City for many years. In 1912, he helped organize New York's first Catholic parish troop, and within a couple of years became a National BSA volunteer with responsibility for promoting Catholic Scouting. He was a co-founder in 1922 of the National Catholic Committee on Scouting, and was later recognized by the National Council BSA for his distinguished service to youth with the Silver Buffalo Award.

He served as president of the New York State Board of Social Welfare from 1929 to 1939, and as New York City administrator of the Works Progress Administration from October 1935 until his resignation in July 1936 (effective August 1.).

== Personal life ==
Ridder was twice married, first to Marie Thompson (1885–1935) in 1911. Before her death in 1935, they were the parents of:

- Mary Hartmann Ridder (1912–1960)
- Gretchen Ridder Nicholas (1915–2019)
- Walter Thompson Ridder (1917–1990)
- Robert Ridder (1919–2000)
- Esther Margaret Ridder (1925–2014)
- Joan Ridder Challinor (1927–2018)

After the death of his first wife, he married Ruth O'Day (1886–1969) on June 2, 1937.

Ridder died from a heart attack at his home in Manhattan on June 14, 1963.
