= Herman Ridder =

American newspaper publisher (1851–1915)

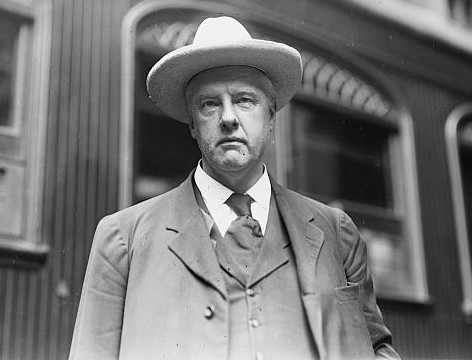
- Ridder in 1910
- Born: March 5, 1851; New York City
- Died: November 1, 1915 (aged 64)
- Occupation: newspaper publisher
- Known for: founding Knight Ridder
- Spouse: Mary C. Amend
- Children: Victor F. Ridder; Bernard H. Ridder; Joseph E. Ridder

Treasurer of the Democratic National Committee
- In office September 27, 1908 – August 6, 1912
- Preceded by: Charles N. Haskell
- Succeeded by: Rolla Wells

Signature
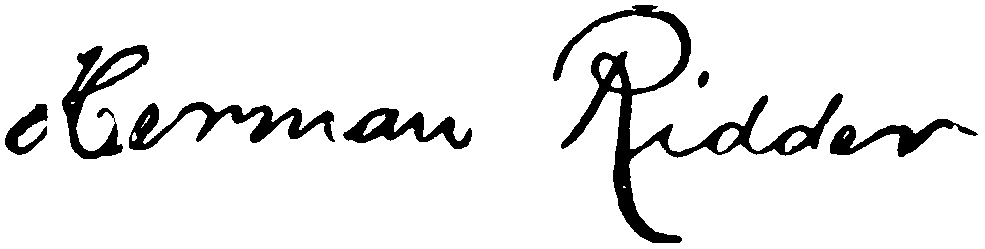

Herman Ridder (March 5, 1851 – November 1, 1915) was an American newspaper publisher and editor.

== Biography ==
Ridder was born in New York City, of German Catholic parents. Because of his parents' financial difficulties, Ridder had to leave school at age 11. He had little education, and was an insurance salesman.

In 1878 he established the Katholisches Volksblatt, and married Mary C. Amend in 1880. They had three children: Victor F. Ridder, Bernard H. Ridder, and Joseph E. Ridder, all of whom worked in the family newspaper. He founded the Catholic News in 1886, later continued by his brother Henry Ridder. In 1890 he became trustee and manager, and in 1907 president of the New Yorker Staats-Zeitung, then the largest and most influential daily paper printed in the German language in the United States.

During the visit of Prince Henry of Prussia in February 1903, Ridder arranged a dinner in Henry's honor. In 1908 he was appointed treasurer of the Democratic National Committee, where he insisted on campaign finance transparency, then declined his re-appointment in 1912. He was an official of several important financial institutions. He was a presidential elector in 1912.

In 1917, after his death, the U.S. declared war on Germany. In 1918 George Sylvester Viereck told federal officials that in 1915 Ridder planned a to purchase a newspaper on behalf of propaganda for the German government. Ridder's son said he was very sick at the time and did no such planning. There was no such purchase.

He died insolvent, having lost his means with the failure of the International Typesetting Machine Company at the start of World War I. Friends and supporters of Ridder assumed the debts of his publishing enterprise, and the Staats-Zeitung continued under the joint management of his sons, Bernard H. Ridder and Victor F. Ridder, and later his grandson Robert Ridder. His company, Ridder Publications, Inc., later merged with Knight Newspapers, Inc. in 1974, and operated under the name Knight Ridder until 2006, when the company was purchased by McClatchy.

Herman Ridder Junior High School in The Bronx was named in his honor in 1931.

== Notes ==
- "Herman Ridder, Editor, Is Dead" (PDF). The New York Times. November 2, 1915.
