= Knight Ridder =

American media company

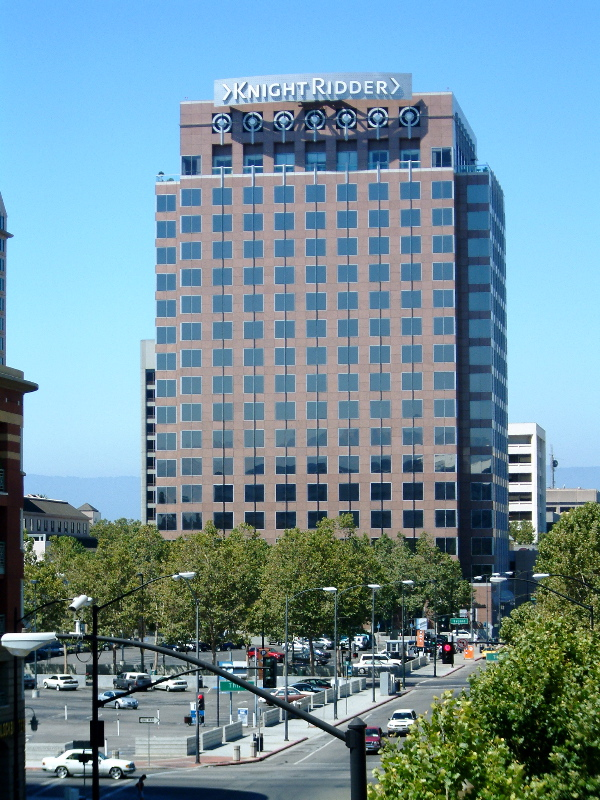
- The Knight Ridder building in San Jose, California.
- Industry: Mass media
- Predecessor: Knight Newspapers, Inc.; Ridder Publications, Inc.
- Founded: July 11, 1974; 52 years ago
- Founder: John S. Knight; Herman Ridder
- Defunct: June 27, 2006; 20 years ago (31 years, 11 months and 16 days)
- Fate: Purchased by The McClatchy Company
- Successor: McClatchy
- Headquarters: San Jose, California, United States
- Products: Newspapers

Knight Ridder /ˈrɪdər/ was an American media company, specializing in newspaper and Internet publishing. It was bought by McClatchy on June 27, 2006, allowing the latter to become the second largest newspaper publisher in the United States at the time, with 32 daily newspaper brands sold. Its headquarters were located in San Jose, California.

== History ==
=== Origins ===
==== Ridder Publications Inc. ====
In 1890, Herman Ridder became trustee, treasurer and manager of New Yorker Staats-Zeitung, a German language newspaper. Ridder came to own the paper and died in 1915. He was succeeded by his eldest son Bernard H. Ridder. B.H. Ridder and his two brothers, Joseph E. Ridder and Victor F. Ridder, bought rival German-language paper New Yorker Herald in November 1919. The Ridder family acquired the Long Island Daily Press in December 1926, followed by The Journal of Commerce and New York Commercial for $2.85 million in January 1927.

The Ridders purchased the St. Paul Pioneer Press and Saint Paul Dispatch in August 1927, acquired an interest in the Aberdeen American News in August 1928, followed by the Grand Forks Herald in June 1929, and bought a 40% stake in The Seattle Times Company in January 1930. They sold the Long Island Daily Press to Samuel Irving Newhouse Sr. in 1932. Ridder acquired the Duluth News Tribune in 1936, the San Jose Mercury News in July 1952, the Long Beach Press-Telegram in August 1952, sold the New Yorker Staats-Zeitung in 1953, purchased the Gary Post-Tribune in August 1966, and Daily Camera in April 1969.

In September 1969, company president Herman Henry "Hank" Ridder died. In November 1969, the company went public. At that time it was the eighth largest newspaper chain in the country in terms of circulation. In May 1973, Ridder acquired the Wichita Eagle-Beacon for $40.5 million.

==== Knight Newspapers Inc. ====
In October 1903, Charles Landon Knight became a co-owner of the Akron Beacon Journal and assumed full control in June 1909. He died in September 1933 and the paper was inherited by his eldest son John S. Knight. Knight acquired the Miami Herald in 1937, Detroit Free Press in 1940, and Chicago Daily News in 1944. Knight bought The Charlotte Observer for $7 million in December 1954, the Florida Keys Keynoter in 1956, and sold the Daily News in January 1959. Knight bought The Charlotte News in April 1959, followed by three Georgia papers in February 1969. That sale included The Macon Telegraph.

In March 1969, Knight went public, leaving the Knight family with about 59% of outstanding stock. John S. Knight and his brother James sold $30 million of their holdings in the company. In September 1969, Knight acquired the Boca Raton News. In October 1969, Knight bought The Philadelphia Inquirer and Philadelphia Daily News for $55 million. The deal boosted Knight from the fifth to the third largest newspaper chain in the United States in terms of circulation. In August 1973, Knight acquired the Lexington Herald-Leader. In September 1973, Knight purchased R.W. Page Corp. The sale included the Columbus Ledger-Enquirer and The Bradenton Herald.

==== Merger ====
On July 11, 1974, Knight Newspapers and Ridder Publications agreed to merge. The newly formed group would own 35 newspapers with a combined daily circulation of 3.6 million. At the time Gannett owned 54 papers with a combined daily circulation of 2.3 million. As a result, the deal would make the combined Knight Ridder the second largest newspaper chain in the United States in terms of number of papers owned, and the largest in terms of circulation. The plan called for both partners to divest from radio and television.

Stockholders approved the deal that November. Annual revenue for the newly combined firm was expected to be $550 million. The new name was Knight-Ridder Newspapers Inc. Lee Hills was elected board chairman and CEO. Alvah Chapman Jr. was elected president. Bernard H. Ridder Jr. became vice chairman. John S. Knight became editorial chairman as well as a board member.

=== Post-merger ===
Knight Ridder acquired the Centre Daily Times in August 1979, and the Fort Wayne News-Sentinel in February 1980. Knight Ridder became the first newspaper publisher to experiment with videotex when it launched its Viewtron system in 1983. After investing six years of research and $50 million into the service, Knight Ridder shut down Viewtron in 1986 when the service's interactivity features proved more popular than news delivery.

In December 1986, Knight Ridder purchased The State-Record Company for $311 million. The sale included six dailies and two weeklies: The State of Columbia, The Columbia Record, Myrtle Beach Sun News, Biloxi Sun-Herald, Daily Times Leader of West Point, and Starkville Daily News. In August 1988, Knight Ridder purchased Dialog Information Services Inc. from Lockheed Corporation. In October 1988, the company placed its eight broadcast television stations up for sale to reduce debt and to pay for the purchase of Dialog. In February 1995, Knight Ridder sold The Journal of Commerce to The Economist Group for $115 million.

In August 1995, Knight Ridder bought Lesher Communications, publisher of the Contra Costa Times, for $360 million. In April 1997, Knight Ridder bought The Kansas City Star, Fort Worth Star-Telegram, Belleville News-Democrat and Wilkes-Barre Times Leader for $1.65 billion from The Walt Disney Company, who recently acquired them from Capital Cities Communications. In July 1997, Knight Ridder traded the Boulder Daily Camera to E. W. Scripps Company in exchange for The Monterey County Herald and San Luis Obispo Tribune. In October 1997, Knight Ridder sold the Boca Raton News to Community Newspaper Holdings. In November 1997, Knight Ridder sold the Long Beach Press-Telegram to Garden State Newspapers Inc., an affiliate MediaNews Group.

In April 1998, Knight Ridder announced it will relocate its headquarters from Miami, Florida to San Jose, California. The goal was to change its public image from a traditional newspaper company to a high-technology information provider. In February 1998, the company sold the Gary Post-Tribune to Hollinger International, Inc. In April 2000, Knight Ridder purchased The Olathe News.

==== Iraq War coverage ====
In the run-up to the 2003 invasion of Iraq, Knight Ridder DC Bureau reporters Jonathan Landay and Warren Strobel wrote a series of articles critical of intelligence suggesting links between Saddam Hussein, the obtainment of weapons of mass destruction, and Al-Qaeda, citing anonymous sources. Landay and Strobel's stories ran counter to reports by The New York Times, The Washington Post and other national publications, resulting in some newspapers within the Knight-Ridder chain refusing to run the two reporters' stories, with some choosing to substitute coverage from The Times.

After the war and the discrediting of many initial news reports written and carried by others, Strobel and Landay received the Raymond Clapper Memorial Award from the Senate Press Gallery in 2004, for their coverage.

The Huffington Post headlined the two as "the reporting team that got Iraq right". The Columbia Journalism Review described the reporting as "unequaled by the Bigfoots working at higher-visibility outlets such as the New York Times, the Washington Post, the Wall Street Journal and the Los Angeles Times".

Later after the war, their work was featured in Bill Moyers' PBS documentary "Buying The War" and was dramatized in Rob Reiner's 2017 film Shock and Awe.

=== Purchase by McClatchy ===
In February 2005, Knight Ridder purchased the Palo Alto Daily News and its four sibling publications. In August 2005, Knight Ridder sold the Detroit Free Press and Tallahassee Democrat to Gannett. In return, the company acquired the Idaho Statesman, The Bellingham Herald and The Olympian.

In November 2005, the Knight Ridder announced plans for "strategic initiatives," which involved the possible sale of the company. This came after three major institutional shareholders publicly urged management to put the company up for sale. At the time, the company had a higher profit margin than many Fortune 500 companies, including ExxonMobil. On March 13, 2006, The McClatchy Company announced its agreement to purchase Knight Ridder for a purchase price of $6.5 billion in cash, stock and debt. The deal gave McClatchy 32 daily newspapers in 29 markets, with a total circulation of 3.3 million. However, for various reasons, McClatchy decided immediately to resell twelve of these papers.

The accumulative sale price $2.078 billion. The San Jose Mercury and Contra Costa Times went to Bay Area News Group, co-owned by MediaNews. The St. Paul Pioneer Press and The Monterey County Herald went to Hearst Communications, who agreed to later resell them to MediaNews. The Philadelphia Inquirer and Philadelphia Daily News went to Philadelphia Media Holdings. The Akron Beacon Journal went to Black Press Media, The News-Sentinel went to Ogden Newspapers, the Duluth News Tribune and Grand Forks Herald went to Forum Communications Company, and Aberdeen American News went to Schurz Communications. Finally, the Wilkes-Barre Times Leader was sold to private investors in June 2006.

== List of newspapers ==
Daily newspapers owned by Knight Ridder and its predecessors – listed alphabetically by place of publication – included:

- The American News (Aberdeen, South Dakota), 1928–2006
- Akron Beacon Journal (Akron, Ohio), 1903–2006
- Belleville News-Democrat (Belleville, Illinois), 1997–2006
- The Bellingham Herald (Bellingham, Washington), 2005–2006
- Sun Herald (Biloxi, Mississippi), 1986–2006
- Boca Raton News (Boca Raton, Florida), 1969–1997
- The Idaho Statesman (Boise, Idaho), 2005–2006
- The Daily Camera (Boulder, Colorado), 1969–1997
- The Herald (Bradenton) (Bradenton, Florida), 1973–2006
- The Charlotte Observer (Charlotte, North Carolina), 1955–2006
- Chicago Daily News (Chicago, Illinois), 1944–1959
- The State (Columbia, South Carolina), 1986–2006
- Columbus Ledger-Enquirer (Columbus, Georgia), 1973–2006
- Detroit Free Press (Detroit, Michigan), 1940–2005
- Duluth News Tribune (Duluth, Minnesota), 1936–2006
- The News-Sentinel (Fort Wayne, Indiana), 1980–2006
- Fort Worth Star-Telegram (Fort Worth, Texas), 1997–2006
- The Post-Tribune (Gary, Indiana), 1966–1998
- Grand Forks Herald (Grand Forks, North Dakota), 1929–2006
- The Kansas City Star (Kansas City, Missouri), 1997–2006
- Lexington Herald-Leader (Lexington, Kentucky), 1973–2006
- Long Beach Press-Telegram (Long Beach, California), 1952–1997
- The Telegraph (Macon, Georgia), 1969–2006
- Florida Keys Keynoter (Marathon, Florida), 1956–2006
- The Miami Herald (Miami, Florida), 1937–2006
- El Nuevo Herald (Miami, Florida), 1977–2006
- The Monterey County Herald (Monterey, California), 1997–2006
- The Sun News (Myrtle Beach, South Carolina), 1986–2006
- The Journal of Commerce (New York City), 1926–1995
- The Olathe News (Olathe, Kansas), 2000–2006
- The Olympian (Olympia, Washington), 2005–2006
- Palo Alto Daily News (Palo Alto, California), 2005–2006
- Pasadena Star-News (Pasadena, California), 1956–1989
- Philadelphia Daily News (Philadelphia, Pennsylvania), 1969–2006
- The Philadelphia Inquirer (Philadelphia, Pennsylvania), 1969–2006
- St. Paul Pioneer Press (St. Paul, Minnesota), 1927–2006
- San Jose Mercury News (San Jose, California), 1952–2006
- The Tribune (San Luis Obispo, California), 1997–2006
- Centre Daily Times (State College, Pennsylvania), 1979–2006
- Tallahassee Democrat (Tallahassee, Florida), 1965–2005
- Contra Costa Times (Walnut Creek, California), 1995–2006
- The Wichita Eagle (Wichita, Kansas), 1973–2006
- Times Leader (Wilkes-Barre, Pennsylvania), 1997–2006

== Knight Ridder-owned companies ==
A list of companies that were at one time or another owned by Knight Ridder:

- Vu/Text: 1982–1996. Merged with PressLink to become MediaStream.
- PressLink: ??–1996. Merged with Vu/Text to become MediaStream.
- MediaStream: 1996–2001. Acquired by NewsBank
- DataStar: Acquired from Radio Schweiz Ltd., merged with Dialog to form Knight Ridder Information
- Dialog (online database): Merged with DataStar to form Knight Ridder Information
- Knight Ridder Information: ??–1997, Acquired by MAID, later by Thomson
- Knight Ridder Financial Inc: 1985–1996. Acquired by Global Financial trading as Bridge Data.
- RealCities Network: 2004–2006. RealCities was a portal/hub website for Knight-Ridder group. It was absorbed with The McClatchy Company into McClatchy Interactive and sold to Chicago-based Centro in 2008.

== Knight Ridder-owned television stations ==
Knight Newspapers entered broadcasting in 1946 via the purchase of minority ownership stakes in WQAM in Miami, WIND in Chicago, and WAKR in Akron; all three stations were in markets served by a Knight newspaper. The minority stake in WAKR's parent company, Summit Radio, also included the establishment of WAKR-TV (channel 49), as well as WAKR-FM (97.5) and six radio stations purchased in Dayton, Ohio; Dallas, Texas; and Denver, Colorado. WAKR-TV was built and signed on by Summit on July 23, 1953, as the Akron market's ABC affiliate, moving to channel 23 on December 1, 1967. Knight Ridder divested its stake in Summit Radio by 1977; a planned merger between the two entities in 1968 failed to be consummated.

In 1954, Ridder Newspapers launched WDSM-TV in Superior, Wisconsin, serving the Duluth, Minnesota market. Initially a CBS affiliate, it switched to its present NBC affiliation a year and a half after the station's launch. It was spun off after Ridder's merger with Knight Newspapers, Inc.

From 1956 to 1962, Knight and the Cox publishing family jointly operated Biscayne Television, which owned NBC affiliate WCKT in Miami, Florida, as well as WCKR radio, which this entity purchased from Cox; Knight sold off WQAM to a third party as part of Biscayne's formation. Revelations of improper behavior and underhanded tactics by Biscayne and National Airlines (which signed on WPST-TV, also in Miami) to secure their licenses, along with ethics violations within the FCC itself, resulted in the licenses for both stations being revoked. A replacement license for WCKT was granted in 1960 to Sunbeam Television, the lone bidder for the prior license not to have engaged in any unethical behavior; Biscayne sold to Sunbeam WCKT's non-license assets: the studios, intellectual property and all off- and on-air personnel for the new station, which took the WCKT name for continuity. Cox repurchased WCKR, reviving that station's prior WIOD call sign.

Following the divestment of their stake in Summit Radio, Knight Ridder acquired Poole Broadcasting, which consisted of WJRT-TV in Flint, Michigan, WTEN in Albany, New York and its satellite WCDC in Adams, Massachusetts, and WPRI-TV in Providence, Rhode Island. Immediately after the acquisition of these stations was finalized, Knight Ridder cut a corporate affiliation deal with ABC, switching then-CBS affiliates WTEN/WCDC and WPRI (the latter of which eventually rejoined CBS) to ABC (WJRT was already affiliated with ABC when the affiliation deal was made). As part of the deal, Poole Broadcasting would eventually become Knight Ridder Broadcasting. Knight Ridder would acquire several television stations in medium-sized markets during the 1980s, including three stations owned by The Detroit News which the Gannett Company—which purchased the newspaper in 1986—could not keep due to Federal Communications Commission regulations on media cross-ownership and/or television duopolies then in effect. (None of Knight Ridder's later acquisitions changed their network affiliations under Knight Ridder ownership; for example, then-NBC affiliate WALA-TV in Mobile, Alabama remained an NBC affiliate when it was owned by Knight Ridder and would switch to Fox several years after Knight Ridder sold the station.)

In early 1989, Knight Ridder announced its exit from broadcasting, selling all of its stations to separate buyers; the sales were finalized in the summer and early fall of that year. This deal was made in order to reduce their debt loads from the proceedings. One of the stations, WALA-TV went to Burnham Broadcasting for $40 million, while WKRN would go to Young Broadcasting for $50 million, KOLD-TV to News-Press & Gazette Company for an undisclosed price, and two television stations WPRI and WTKR to Narragansett Television L.P. for $150 million on February 18, 1989. This was followed by the following month with the sale of KTVY-TV to WHO-TV owner Palmer Communications, for $50 million. WTEN was the next-to-last station to be sold, going to Young Broadcasting for $38 million, and WJRT would eventually becoming the final Knight Ridder station, to be sold to SJL Broadcasting for $39 million.

Stations owned by Knight Ridder and predecessors
Media market	State	Station	Purchased	Sold	Notes
Mobile	Alabama	WALA-TV	1986	1989	
Tucson	Arizona	KOLD-TV	1986	1989	
Miami	Florida	WCKT	1956	1962	(Note: Co-owned by Knight Newspapers and Cox Newspapers, long before Knight's merger with Ridder Publications.) (Note: The license for WCKT under Cox-Knight ownership was revoked by the FCC, with the current license dating back to 1962. However, most contemporary accounts and WSVN itself recognize the history of both WCKTs as one and the same.)
Adams	Massachusetts	WCDC-TV	1978	1989	(Note: Satellite of WTEN.)
Flint	Michigan	WJRT-TV	1978	1989	
Albany	New York	WTEN	1978	1989	
Akron–Cleveland	Ohio	WAKR-TV	1953	1977	(Note: While this station was owned by Summit Radio from 1953 to 1994, Knight Newspapers held a 45 percent minority stake in Summit that predated this station's establishment, this was fully divested by Knight Ridder in 1977.)
Oklahoma City	Oklahoma	KTVY	1986	1989	
Providence	Rhode Island	WPRI-TV	1978	1989	
Nashville	Tennessee	WKRN-TV	1983	1989	
Norfolk	Virginia	WTKR	1981	1989	
Superior	Wisconsin	WDSM-TV	1954	1974	(Note: Owned by Ridder Publications until the merger between Ridder and Knight forced its divestiture.)

== Media ==
• Shock and Awe, 2018 film about a group of journalists at Knight Ridder's Washington Bureau who investigate the reasons behind the Bush Administration's 2003 invasion of Iraq.

== Notable people ==
- Lee Hills
