= New Yorker Staats-Zeitung =

German-language weekly newspaper

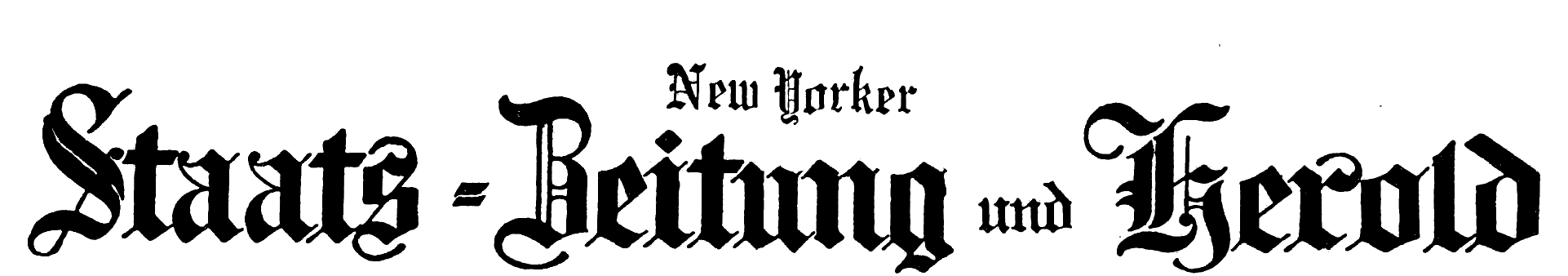

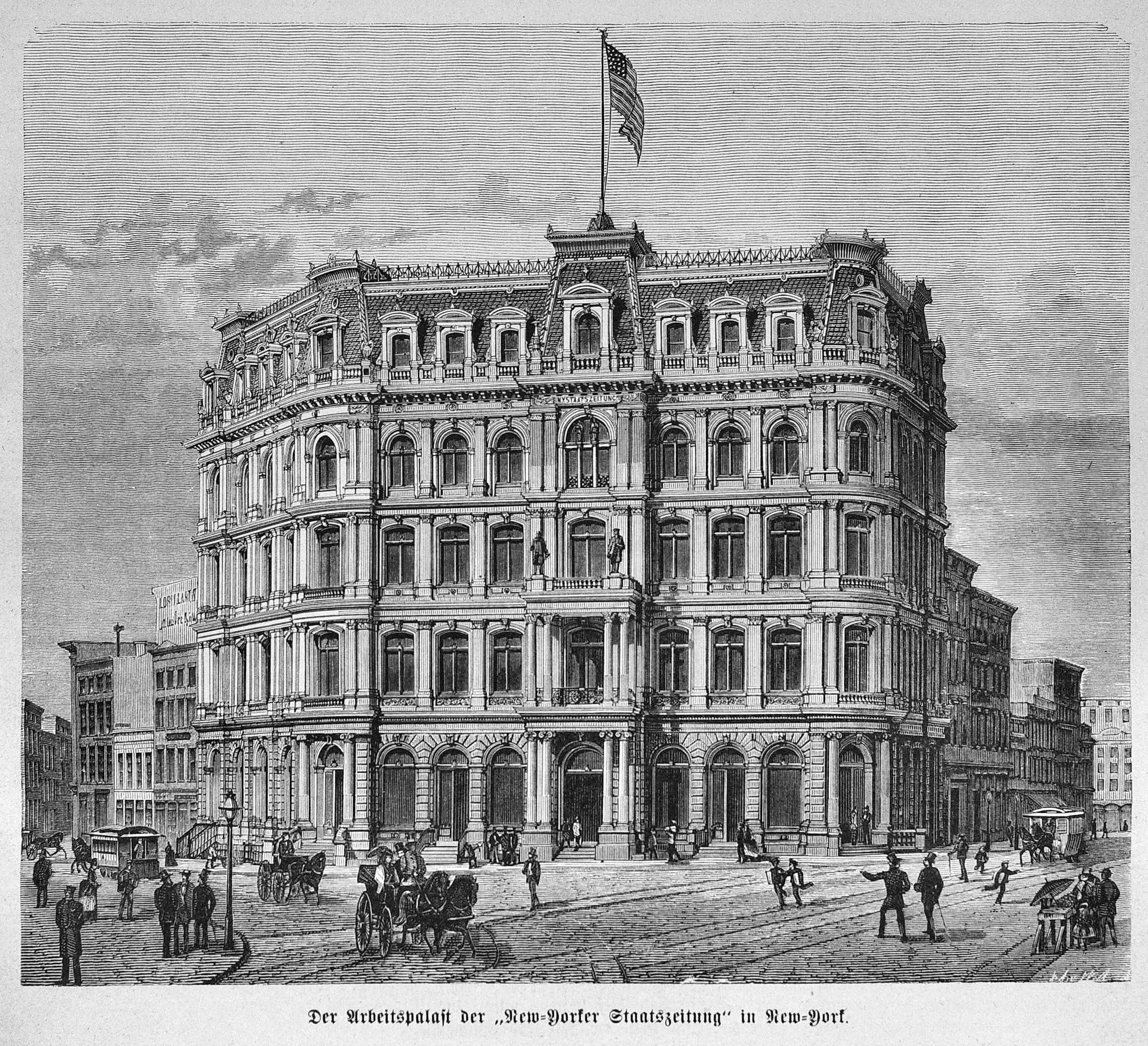
- Staats-Zeitung Building (1873–1907), Printing House Square, New York City
- Type: Weekly newspaper
- Owner: Jes Rau
- Founded: 1834; 192 years ago
- Language: German
- Headquarters: Sarasota, Florida
- ISSN: 1542-1465
- Website: www.germancorner.com/NYStaatsZ/

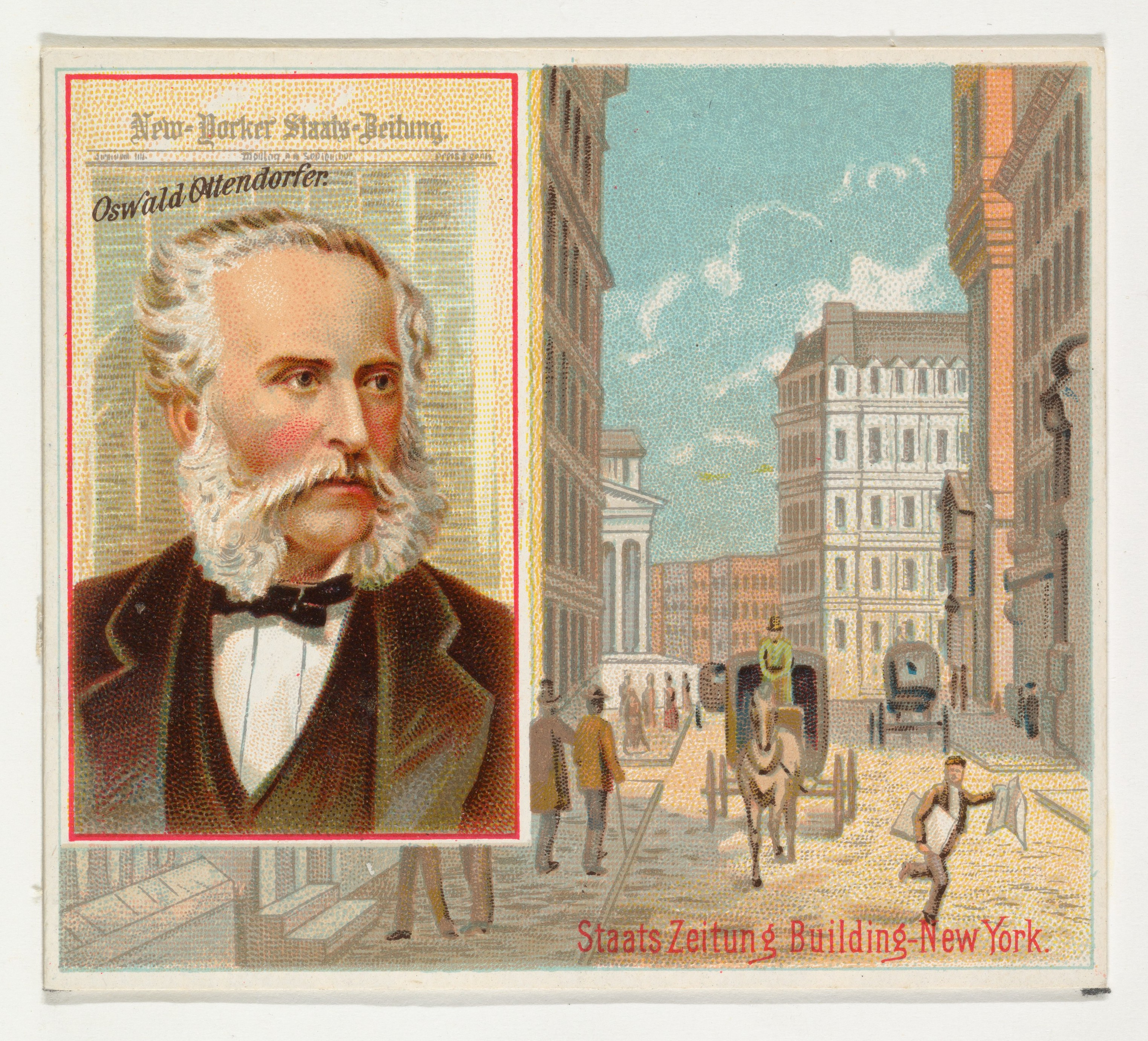
Oswald Ottendorfer and Building of New Yorker Staats-Zeitung, from the American Editors series (N35) for Allen & Ginter Cigarettes, 1887

The New Yorker Staats-Zeitung (transl. "New Yorker State Newspaper"), nicknamed The Staats, is a German-language newspaper in the United States. It is one of the oldest newspapers in the country, having been published since the mid-1830s.

Its publisher claims it to be the leading German-language weekly newspaper in the country. In the late 19th century, it was one of New York City's major daily newspapers, exceeded in circulation only by the New York World and the New-York Tribune. Among other achievements, as of its sesquicentennial anniversary in 1984 it had never missed a publication date, thereby laying claim to the title of being continuously published longer than any other newspaper of any language in America.

== History ==
Gustavus Adolphus Neumann, editor 1834–1853

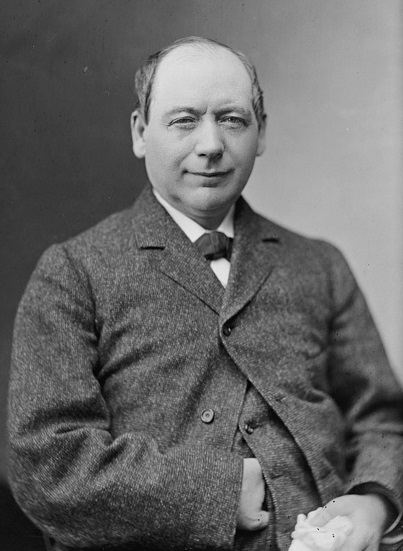
Anthony Eickhoff, editor 1854–1856

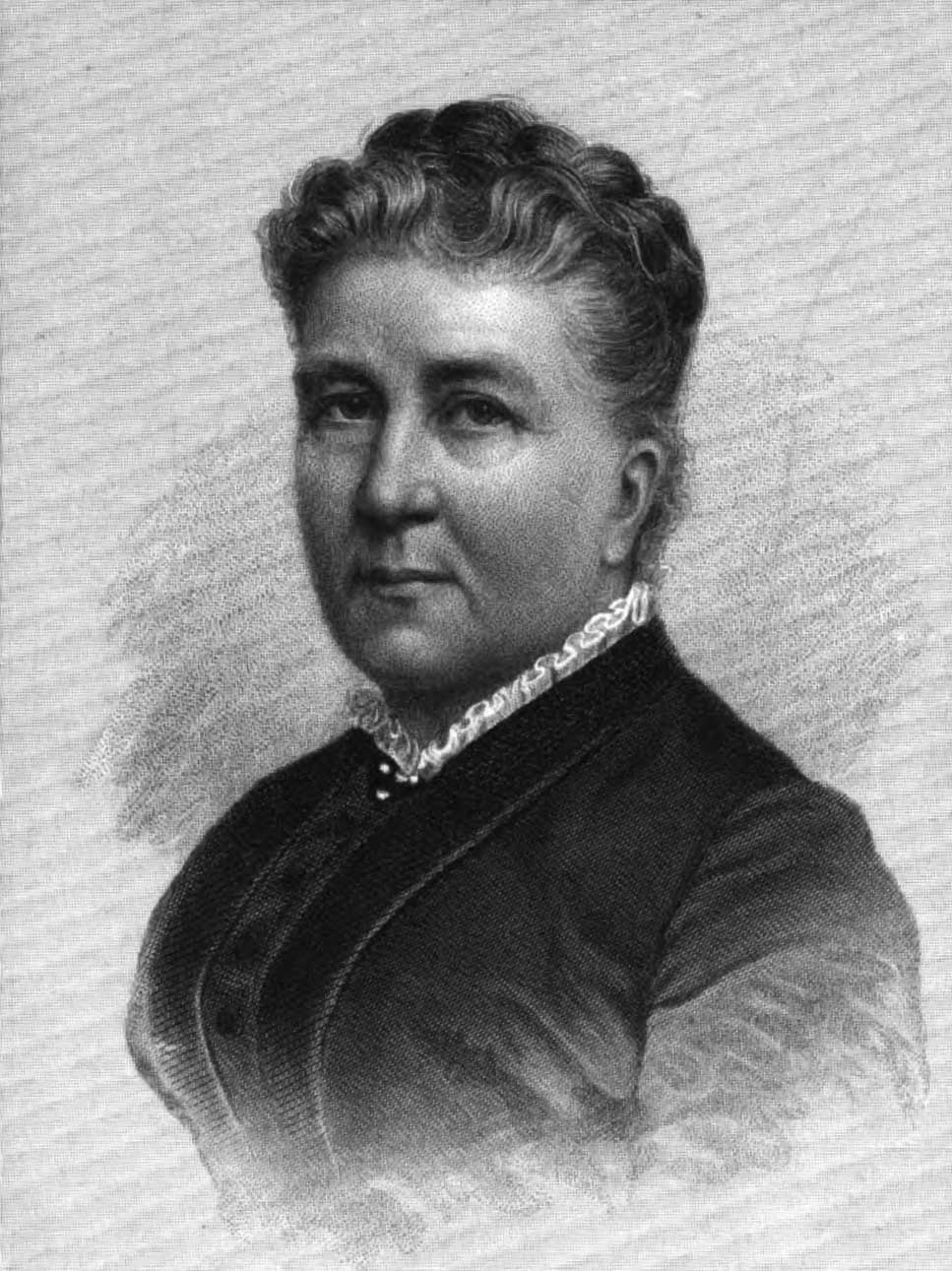
Anna Uhl Ottendorfer, business manager 1845–1884

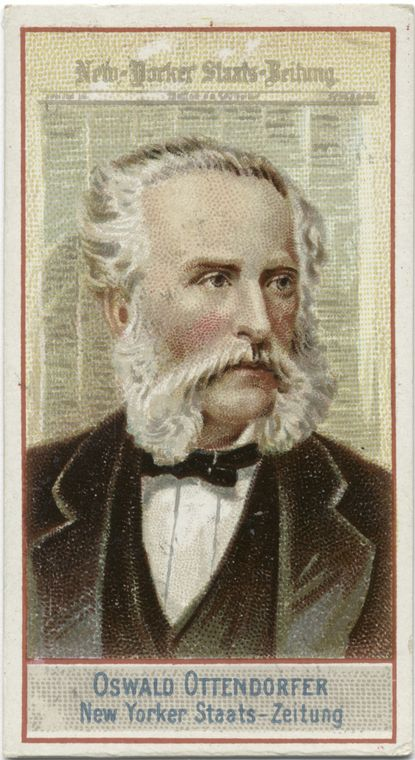
Oswald Ottendorfer, editor 1858–1900

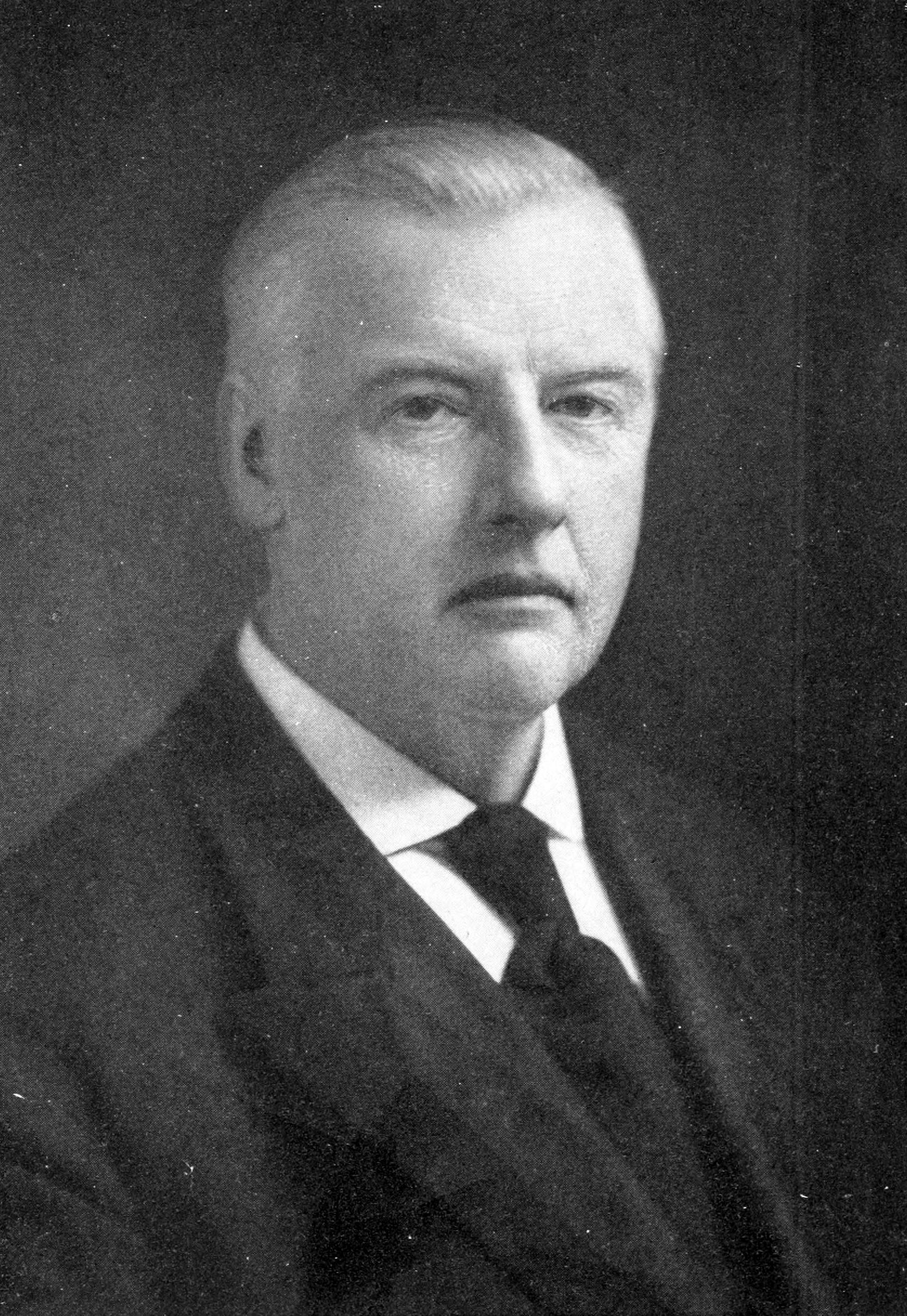
Herman Ridder, manager 1890–1915

The Staats-Zeitung was founded in New York City in 1834 by a society of German-American businessmen. The partners included George Zahm, Stepan Molitor, Conrad Braeker, and Gustav Adolph Neumann, with Neumann serving as editor-in-chief (as well as reporter and production foreman). Neumann subsequently purchased shares of the enterprise until, in the late 1830s, he obtained a majority, after which the society was dissolved and he became sole owner. The first issue was published on December 24, 1834. The nascent newspaper consisted of four pages and was printed weekly using a Washington hand-press. Initial circulation was small, limited by the capacity of the press (2000 impressions per day) and by the size of the audience (primarily German immigrants). At that time there were approximately 10,000 German-born citizens in New York City.

Growth during the first few years of the paper's existence was also impeded by the Financial Panic of 1837, but by 1839 it was sufficiently successful to move to a location on Frankfort Street, a few blocks from City Hall. Under Neumann's guidance, improvements to the physical plant were undertaken to support the growth that accompanied its increasing influence. In 1843, on obtaining a single cylinder hand-operated press that could print 600 sheets per hour, he converted the Staats-Zeitung to a tri-weekly publication.

The paper's staff also expanded as it grew. Notable additions included: Jacob Uhl, who may have been hired as a printer as early as 1836; Jacob's wife Anna Uhl, who worked as a compositor, secretary, and business manager; and Oswald Ottendorfer, who appears to have been hired in the counting room in 1850. All had a role to play in the unfolding story.

In 1845 Jacob Uhl bought ownership and publishing rights from Neumann who, nonetheless, continued in an editorial capacity until 1853. Working together, Jacob and Anna Uhl increased both advertising patronage and circulation, enabling a shift to daily publication not long after the purchase. Subsequently, the paper's physical plant was moved to and combined with a printing office owned by Jacob Uhl, and a Sunday edition was added on January 3, 1848. The enhanced paper quickly outgrew both the press capabilities and the physical space of the printing office, and in 1850 Uhl purchased property specifically to house the Staats-Zeitung. He installed the most rapid printing presses then available in a new building erected on the property for that purpose.

Staats-Zeitung Building, 1857–1873

When Jacob Uhl died in 1852, Anna Uhl took over management of the newspaper. The paper continued to thrive, and by 1857 another expansion was required. Anna Uhl purchased property on what was then Chatham Street (also known at that time as "Newspaper Row", now Park Row) and had a suitable building erected. One of the first rotary type-revolving presses was installed, increasing the publishing capacity to 4,000 papers per hour.

In 1858, Anna Uhl appointed Oswald Ottendorfer – who had gradually been contributing more assistance – as editor. In 1859 Anna Uhl and Oswald Ottendorfer were married, and continued to operate the paper together, with Oswald serving as editor and publisher while Anna functioned as business manager. In 1873 another expansion was completed under the German-American architect J. William Schickel at 17 Chatham Street. Anna Ottendorfer continued as business manager until shortly before her death in 1884 when her son Edward Uhl succeeded her. Together Anna and Oswald Ottendorfer developed the Staats-Zeitung into a major newspaper. By the 1870s, its circulation was comparable to English-language newspapers like the New York Tribune and the New York Times.

In 1879, the property of the paper was changed into a stock company. When Oswald Ottendorfer died in 1900, the newspaper was sold to Herman Ridder, who had become manager and trustee in 1890. Ridder went on to contribute to the foundation of the Knight Ridder conglomerate, and the Staats-Zeitung gradually became a side line. It stayed in the Ridder family until 1953, when it was sold to the Steuer family who changed from a daily newspaper to three times a week and finally a weekly. From 1968 to 1969, the German entertainer and comedian Herbert Feuerstein was editor-in-chief of the newspaper. In 1989, it was sold to Jes Rau, a former New York correspondent for Die Zeit, who eventually moved the newspaper's operations to Sarasota, Florida. Lars Halter served as editor-in-chief until April 2001, when he was fired over editorial disputes with Rau. Circulation in 2001 was estimated at 10,000. In 2002, a new corporate entity was formed to publish the paper, which became New Yorker Staats-Zeitung & Jes Rau's German Times. As of 2025, it still publishes weekly, except for one week in July and one in December. It has no active online presence.

== Political influence ==
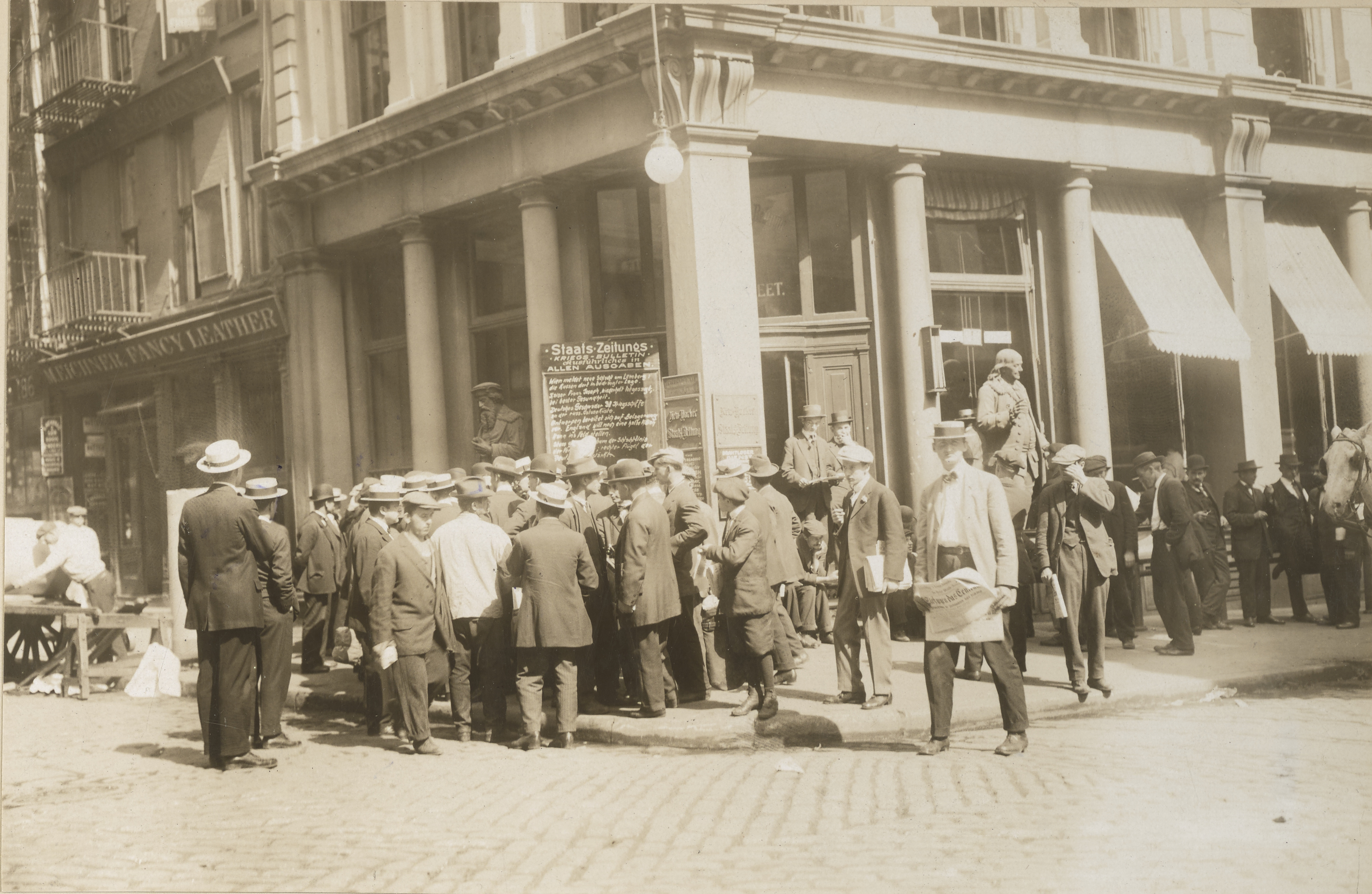
German Americans outside the Staats-Zeitung offices, reading about the outbreak of World War I (1914)

The German-American businessmen who founded the New Yorker Staats-Zeitung in 1834 did so with a specific agenda in mind. The paper was to be the voice of German-Americans who opposed the Whig Party, then the dominant political force in New York City. This stance aligned the paper with the objectives of the Jacksonian Democrats, who were at that time developing the Tammany Hall political machine. Mr. Neumann's editorials took forceful and animated positions in support of the interests of German-American immigrants who sought to become full participants in the governance of their new home.

However, the paper was also concerned with events in Europe, undoubtedly because German immigration at this time was often motivated by political repression in Germany. Jacob Uhl, for example, is said to have left Germany a year or two after being jailed for participating in a democratic riot in Frankfurt. As owner of the paper, he supported the German Revolution of 1848. Oswald Ottendorfer was an active participant in those European uprisings – in 1848 in Vienna and in 1849 in Saxony. His passion for things political remained after he immigrated to America, and he continued to develop the political clout of the Staats-Zeitung after he became editor in 1858.

From 1860 to 1864, Franz Umbscheiden – who also participated in the German Revolution of 1848 – was on the staff.

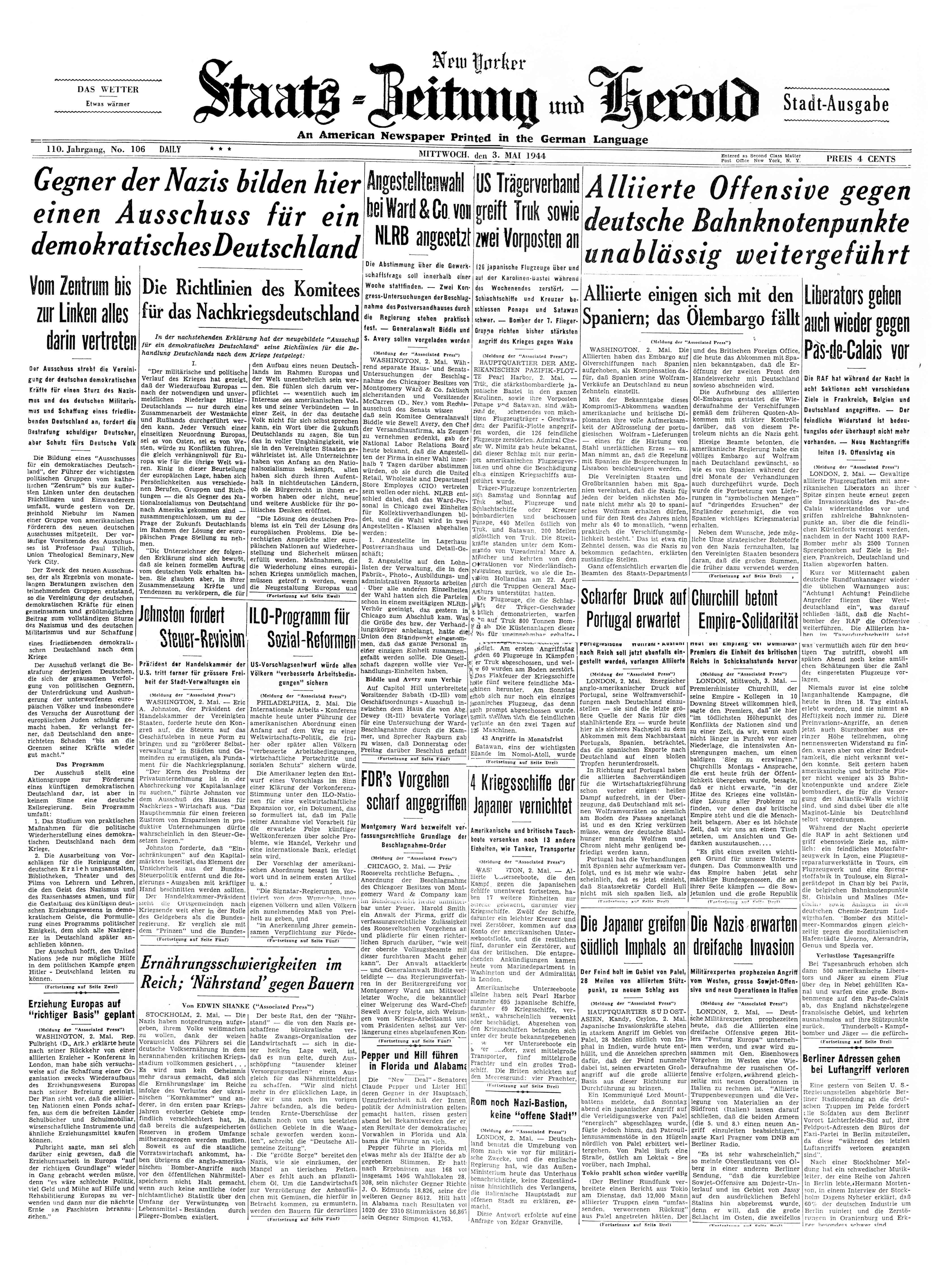
Front page of the New Yorker Staats-Zeitung und Herold (May 3, 1944)

Leading up to World War II, the paper had an evolving view of Adolf Hitler and the Third Reich. In 1934, the Staats-Zeitung opposed the "mock trial" of Hitler to be held at Madison Square Garden, calling Nazi Germany a "friendly nation" and asking the U.S. to respect "the laws and deeds of the statutory regime of the German Reich; the laws and deeds of the lawful administration of government of a friendly power". A year earlier, however, the paper published an editorial, entitled "Blind Fanaticism" and signed by its then editor, Benjamin F. Ridder, denouncing the Nazi persecution of Jews. Later, the paper espoused a strongly anti-Nazi position, publishing many anti-Nazi editorials and articles, despite Friends of New Germany leader Heinz Spanknöbel’s attempt to storm the paper's office and force the editors to write Nazi-sympathetic articles.

== See also ==
- Illinois Staats-Zeitung, the second largest German-language newspaper in the United States and the newspaper with the second-largest circulation in the city of Chicago after the Chicago Tribune
- Anzeiger des Westens, the German-language daily paper in St. Louis founded one year later, that became the largest newspaper of any language in the state
- Carl Eytel, an early 20th-century German-American artist living in Palm Springs, California, who contributed to the newspaper over a 14-year period
