= Ottendorfer =

Ottendorfer is a surname. Notable people with the surname include:

- Anna Ottendorfer ( 1815–1884), American journalist and philanthropist
- Oswald Ottendorfer (1826–1900), American journalist

== See also ==
- Ottendorfer Public Library and Stuyvesant Polyclinic Hospital, historic building in New York City
