= Yuzawa =

Yuzawa may refer to:

== Places ==
- Yuzawa, Akita, Japan
- Yuzawa, Niigata, Japan

== People with the surname ==
- George Yuzawa (湯沢 克巳, 1915–2011), Japanese-American community activist
- Masato Yuzawa (湯澤 聖人, born 1993), Japanese footballer
- Michio Yuzawa (湯沢 三千男, 1888–1963), Japanese bureaucrat
- Ryo Yuzawa (遊澤 亮, born 1976), Japanese table tennis player
- Yosuke Yuzawa (湯澤 洋介, born 1990), Japanese footballer
