= New York Free Circulating Library =

American public library (1879–1901)

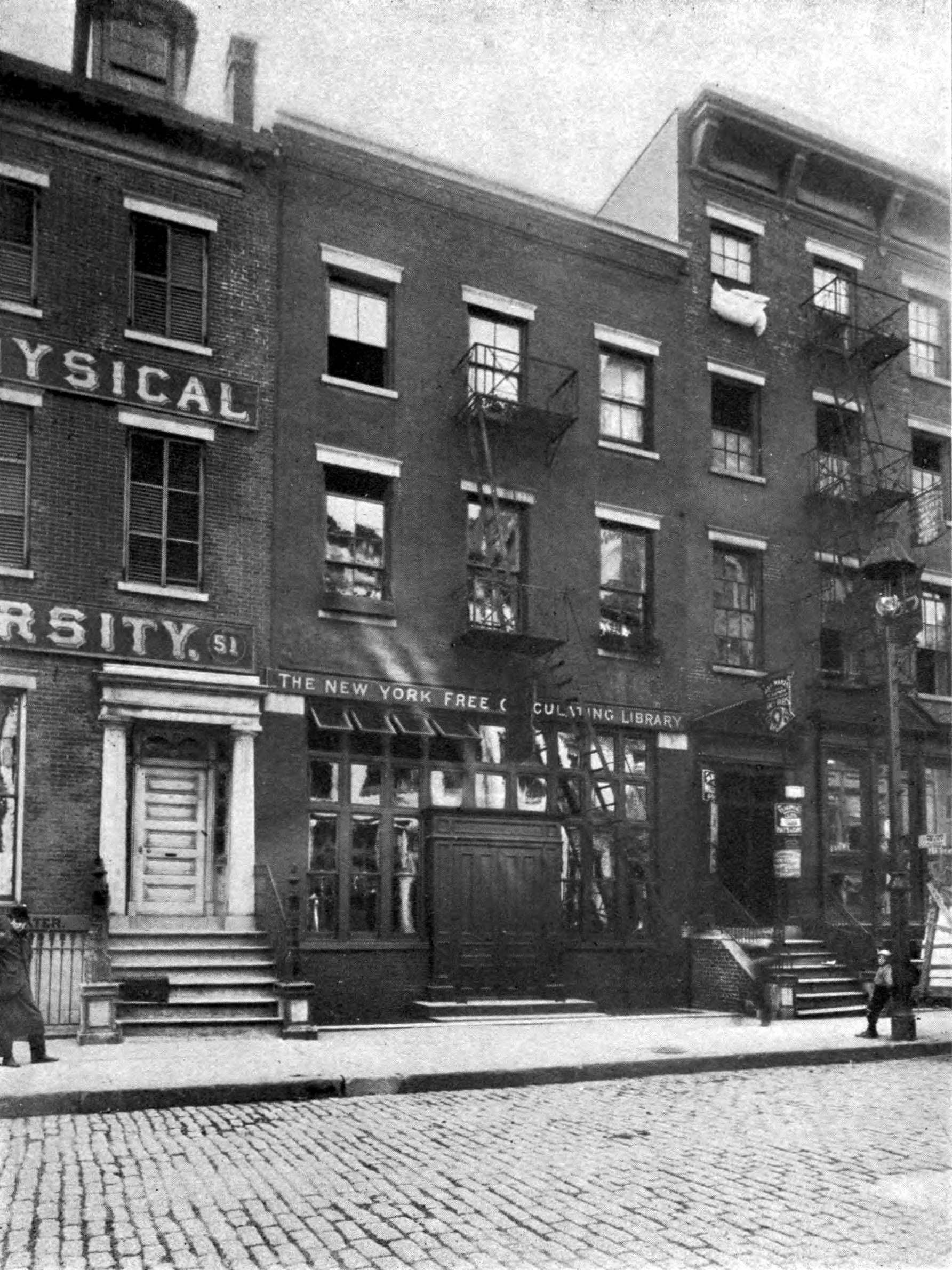
- 49 Bond Street (opened 1883) where the first branch of the NYFCL settled for most of its existence.
- Location: New York, New York, United States
- Type: Public lending library
- Established: 1879; 147 years ago
- Branches: 11

Access and use
- Circulation: 1,600,000 (1900)

The New York Free Circulating Library (NYFCL) was founded in 1879 and incorporated in 1880. Its aim was to supply free reading material and reading rooms to the people of New York City. Over its lifetime, it expanded from a single location to eleven locations and an additional traveling department. It was notable for the large part women played in its administration and staffing. In 1901, the system became part of the New York Public Library.

== Origins ==
During the 1870s and 1880s, the need for an adequate system of home circulation of books was frequently mentioned in New York City papers and government. Most discussions of such a system never got beyond the talking stage, but they were an indication of public appreciation of the need.

Early in 1879, six girls belonging to a sewing class at New York City's Grace Church were waiting for their teacher, and whiled away the time by listening to a sensational story read from a cheap paper by one of their number. The story was overheard by the teacher on her arrival, and she was thus led to inquire regarding the children's reading material, and to make efforts to improve it. The paper was gladly given up in exchange for a book, and each of the girls was offered one such book a week as a loan, on condition that she would never again buy a sensational story paper.

Other women became interested, about 500 books were collected, and a room at 13th Street, east of 4th Avenue, was obtained for library use. The facility was advertised by telling the children to bring their friends, and although at first the room was open only once a week for two hours at a time, the attendance was soon so great that the sidewalk was blocked during the library hours, and on one occasion only two volumes were left in the room.

At the end of the first year about 1,200 volumes, all gifts, were on the shelves, and about 7,000 had been given out to the public. According to the Evening Post for March 18, 1880, patrons included children and men of 60 or 70 years of age, and their dwellings were scattered widely across the city. After wider consultations, and some study of library conditions both in New York and in other large cities, the conclusion was reached that the special needs of the city at this time would be met by the establishment of a library for the circulation of books among the very poor.

== First incorporation ==
With this aim in view, a certificate of incorporation was filed in March 1880. The incorporators named in the certificate were Benjamin H. Field, Philip Schuyler, William W. Appleton, Julia G. Blagden, and Mary S. Kernochan. The object of the society was stated to be the furnishing of “free reading to the people of the City of New York by the Establishment (in one or more places, in the City of New York,) of a Library or Libraries with or without Reading Rooms; which Library or Libraries and Reading Rooms shall be open (without payment) to the public.”

From the room on 13th Street, the library was moved to 36 Bond Street where two rooms were rented in a private house and refitted and furnished as a library. Circulation was begun at this location on March 22, 1880, with 1,837 volumes on the shelves. During April, the first full month, the number of volumes taken for home use amounted to 1,653, and this number grew steadily month by month, that for October being 4,212 volumes. Card holders numbered 712 on March 22, and reached 2,751 on November 1. Of the 22,558 volumes circulated between March and November, 71% were fiction and juveniles; 18% history, biography, and travel; 3% foreign books; 4% science; and 4% poetry, religion, periodicals, and essays. The average daily circulation amounted to about 200 volumes.

In this same period, volumes on the shelves increased from 1,837 to 3,674, the increase consisting of 271 purchases and 1,566 gifts. The gifts included a large amount of material deemed useless, and the library committee concluded that it was “impossible to secure the best and most desirable books from the donations of private households. . . . Of the 3,674 volumes on our shelves, fully one-third are of such a character as to be rarely, if ever, called for.” The committee thought what was needed were “standard works of fiction, popular and reliable books of travel and history, particularly those relating to our own country, and, above all, the better class of books for boys and girls.”

A reading room was opened on June 1, from 4 to 9 p.m. (Sundays included), and appreciation of this service was shown by the number of 1,988 readers, to whom 2,361 periodicals were issued. A card catalog of the library was made for official use and copied for the public. In May the librarian wrote a catalog of the books then on the shelves, about 2,500 volumes, and from this twelve copies were run off by the “chierograph.” In September a printed catalog of the thousand volumes added during the summer was issued in an edition of 200 copies.

In the Library Journal for January 1881, Charles A. Cutter characterized the first report of the library committee as “in some respects the most important that we have ever received. It marks the inception of a movement. The penetration of the free-library idea into a city of the magnitude of New York, is a very important step in its progress. . . . A New Englander or a Westerner from any of the larger cities who goes to New York to live, feels at once that there is something wanting, and says so. The press, too, both daily, weekly, and monthly, is awake to the need — we might also say to the disgrace.” He expressed the hope that resources would increase beyond those “suitable to a small country town.”

Once established, growth in use and circulation was limited only by growth of stock of books, and this in turn only by fiscal resources. The subsequent history of the institution was a record of efforts towards a larger income and administrative development. A public statement of work done and an appeal for subscriptions were made by a meeting held in the hall of the Union League Club on January 20, 1882, attended by some 350 persons. Mayor William R. Grace presided, and addresses were made by John Hall, Joseph H. Choate, Henry C. Potter, and George William Curtis. On February 4, 8, and 11 following, Edward A. Freeman, then in the country on a lecture tour, gave a series of lectures on “The English People in their Three Homes,” in Chickering Hall on behalf of the library. By means of these meetings and by individual solicitation the treasurer was able to report at the annual meeting in November 1882 that the permanent fund amounted to some $34,000.

This fund enabled the trustees to purchase premises at 49 Bond Street on June 9, 1882, and to fit it up for library purposes at a cost of $15,500 for the lot and $13,774.92 for alterations. The books were removed from the rented quarters at 36 Bond Street on May 1, 1883, a change welcomed by readers no less than by librarians, appreciation being shown by a growth in circulation from the 69,280 volumes reported in the first full year of operation (November 1880 - October 1881), to 81,233 volumes in 1882-83.

An interesting tribute to the part taken by women in the establishment of the library and in its administration came in shape of a letter from the board of managers of the Female Christian Home on April 17, 1882, enclosing a check for $1,700 (subsequently increased to $2,000 by additional contributions) representing the balance of the funds of the Home after settling its affairs. This donation was made with request that the “amount be kept as a fund to be called the ‘Women's Fund,’ and that the income from it shall be used for the employment of women in the Free Library or for the purchase of books.”

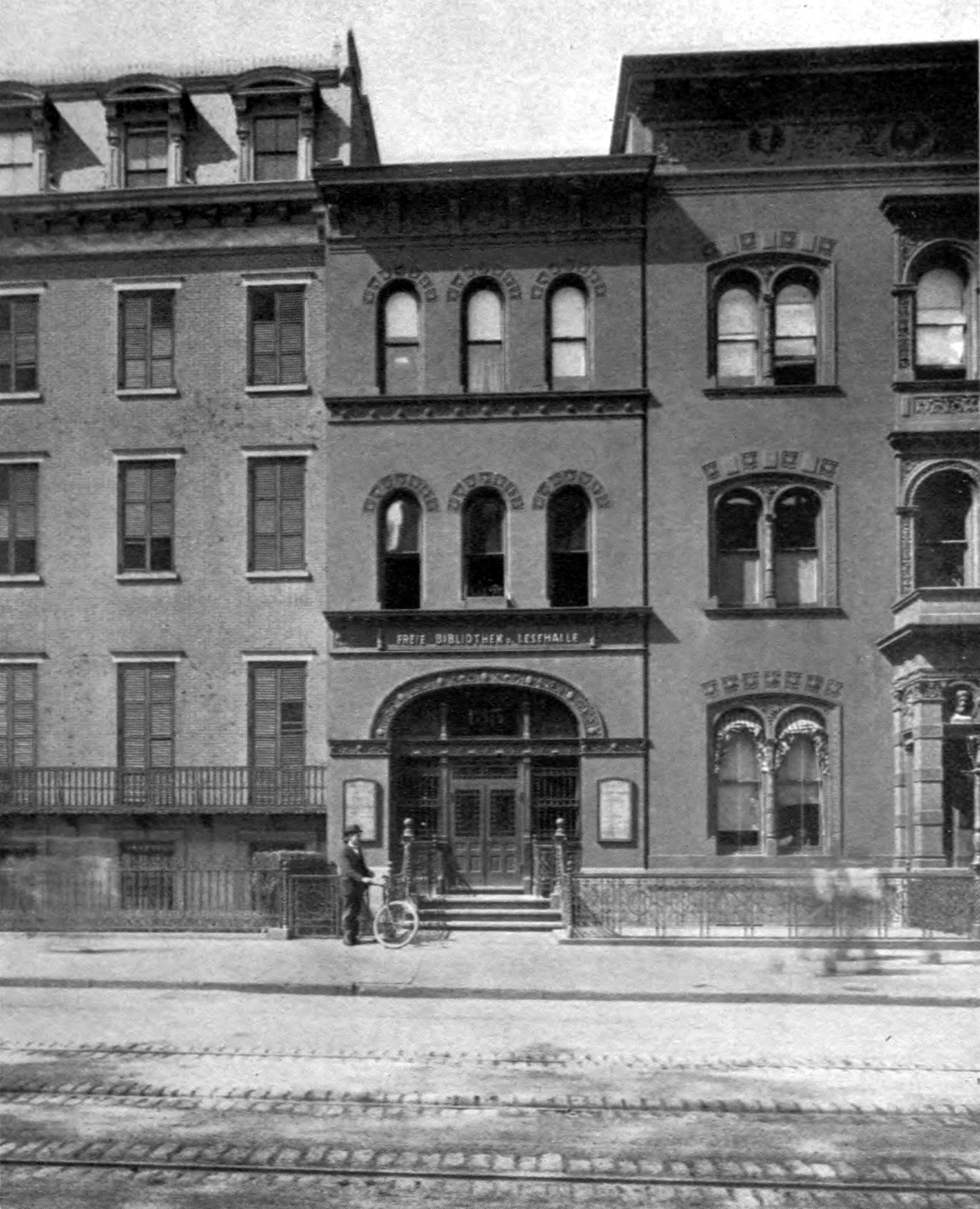
The Ottendorfer Branch, 1884, the first branch designed and built for library purposes

== Second incorporation and an added location ==
The limitations expressed in the terms of the original incorporation eventually rendered the possibilities of growth and effective work too small. To overcome this difficulty, “An Act to incorporate the New York Free Circulating Library” was passed by the state legislature at Albany on April 18, 1884. The first fruit of this new freedom from restriction as to its property holdings came to the library in shape of a letter dated May 12, 1884, from Oswald Ottendorfer, editor of the New Yorker Staats-Zeitung.

Ottendorfer wished to give the NYFCL a branch library at 135 2nd Avenue (near 8th Street) with about 8,000 volumes, half of which were in the German language, the others in the English language. The location was to be leased by the German Hospital and Dispensary to the NYFCL. The gift included $10,000 in 7% railroad bonds and furnishings for the branch, which was to include a reading room. An accompanying condition was that the reading material in German be maintained sufficiently, and German-speaking staff be in attendance. A fire-proof vault was provided in the basement for preserving valuable documents and books of the library, and for the preservation of the records and papers of importance of interested German societies.

This gift and its terms were accepted by the trustees on May 16, 1884, and the same day a lease was executed. Lower 2nd Avenue at that time was the center of a community composed largely of German-speaking people. The Ottendorfer Branch — so named by the trustees in their minute accepting the gift on May 16 — was opened for circulation on December 8, 1884, with 8,819 volumes on its shelves, of which 4,035 were German and 4,784 were English.

== Maturity ==
=== Funding ===
The NYFCL had now passed beyond its experimental stage. The need for its existence was patent to the most superficial observer. That the library — limited only by its monetary resources — had the organization and the machinery for supplying this need was made plain by the success of its two locations. Support for the library from the taxpayers' money was certain to come eventually, in part at least. Until it came, however, money for current expenses and for extension of the work had to be found in contributions from people of means, and few of this class had personal knowledge of the field or of the need. Once interested, though, few lost interest or failed in their annual contributions.

Meetings, public and private, were held, at which the needs and opportunities of the work were presented by men of standing and influence in the community. A meeting of May 2, 1885, was presided over by J. F. Kernochan and addresses were made by Andrew Carnegie and William Woodward, Jr. On Washington's birthday, 1886, Levi P. Morton presided over a meeting held in Steinway Hall and Henry E. Howland, Chauncey M. Depew, and Frederic R. Coudert spoke. In 1890, Benjamin H. Field, president of the board of trustees, presided over a gathering in Chickering Hall on March 6, at which Howland spoke again, and moving appeals were made by ex-President Cleveland, Seth Low, Joseph H. Choate, and Andrew Carnegie. The last of these public meetings in behalf of the library was held in Chickering Hall in 1896, when Mayor Strong presided and addresses were made by Judge Howland, Carnegie, John Lambert Cadwalader, and Bourke Cockran.

Besides appeals made in this fashion, personal letters were addressed to members of various professions setting forth the needs of the library, the work it was doing, and asking support at least in shape of membership contributions. In 1886 circulars were sent to members of the stock exchange, the railroad service, and the dry-goods trade, each signed by half a dozen of the leading men in each of the businesses mentioned. Lawyers and physicians, members of the cotton and other exchanges, the book trade, uptown retail merchants, and other professions and occupations as widely different as the above named were also called upon. In 1896 the number of such letters sent out was reported as 950, in 1897 as 5,000.

The first step towards public funding came in the passage at Albany on July 15, 1886, of “An Act to encourage the growth of free public libraries and free circulating libraries in the cities of the State.” The encouragement consisted in the grant of permission to local authorities to aid free circulating libraries by annual appropriation of funds bearing some ratio to their volumes circulated. From 1887 to 1900, appropriations to the NYFCL made by New York City in accordance with this act totaled $417,250. For seven years, operating funds from private sources and from the City appropriation were about equal, and for the last seven years the City appropriation was several times larger than the income from donations or investments. The City money depended to a certain extent on the volume of circulation — the maximum permissible by statute being ten cents per volume circulated.

=== Character of reading material ===
The library committee continued the initial interest in the character of reading material made available, stating in its report for 1886/7 that it was “attempting to improve the character of the reading, or at least to retain the present high standard for a library of this class” and “therefore refrained from the purchase of many books of an ephemeral or trivial nature, and have not duplicated books of fiction in which the interest might be considered transitory.”

=== Growth of branches ===
The Bond Street Branch and the Ottendorfer Branch constituted the plant of the NYFCL for nearly three years. In 1888, the number of branches doubled with the opening of the George Bruce Branch and the Jackson Square Branch. On January 17, 1887, Catherine W. Bruce had given $50,000 for erection and maintenance of a branch to be known as the George Bruce Branch. This branch was erected at 226 West 42nd Street as a memorial to the donor's father, George Bruce, a type founder. Money was set aside as an endowment fund, and by subsequent gifts Catherine Bruce increased the endowment fund for this branch until at the time of consolidation with the NYPL it amounted to $40,000. The building was opened for circulation on January 6, 1888, with about 7,000 volumes on its shelves. The Jackson Square Branch was opened on July 6, 1888, at 251 West 13th Street, the lot, building, and stock of books being the gift of George W. Vanderbilt.

The fifth or Harlem Branch developed from the opening on July 7, 1892, of a small distributing station in part of a room at 2059 Lexington Avenue on the corner of 125th Street, between five and six hundred volumes being drawn off from Bond Street and Jackson Square Branches. During the lifetime of the NYFCL it moved from there, to two rooms at 1943 Madison Avenue, to 18 East 125th Street (July 1895) and finally to 218 East 125th Street (May 1899). A sixth branch of the system was opened on February 25, 1893, in the parish house of the Church of the Holy Communion at 49 West 20th Street, and was named the Muhlenberg Branch in memory of the first rector of the church, William Augustus Muhlenberg (1796-1877). Before taking up his ministry among the poor in 1845, Muhlenberg had been a nationally known educator (college preparatory schools). The seventh branch also found its first outside support from a church. This was the Bloomingdale Branch, opened on June 3, 1896, at 816 Amsterdam Avenue. In 1898, the Bloomingdale Branch moved to the first building to be constructed with NYFCL funds.

Two new branches and the equivalent of a third were established in 1897. The Riverside Branch opened at 261 West 69th Street on May 26, 1897; the Yorkville Branch opened at 1523 Second Avenue, on the corner of 79th Street, on June 10; and the Traveling Library department was established in April of that year at the George Bruce Branch. The Riverside Branch opened using the books of the Riverside Association, which had been operating as an independent library since 1894. This was the first branch to use an open shelf system. The Yorkville Branch was located in a thickly populated section, Germans and Bohemians forming a large portion of the non-English readers. So great were the demands during its first summer that adequate service could scarcely have been given had not librarians and assistants in other branches voluntarily given their services to support the local staff.

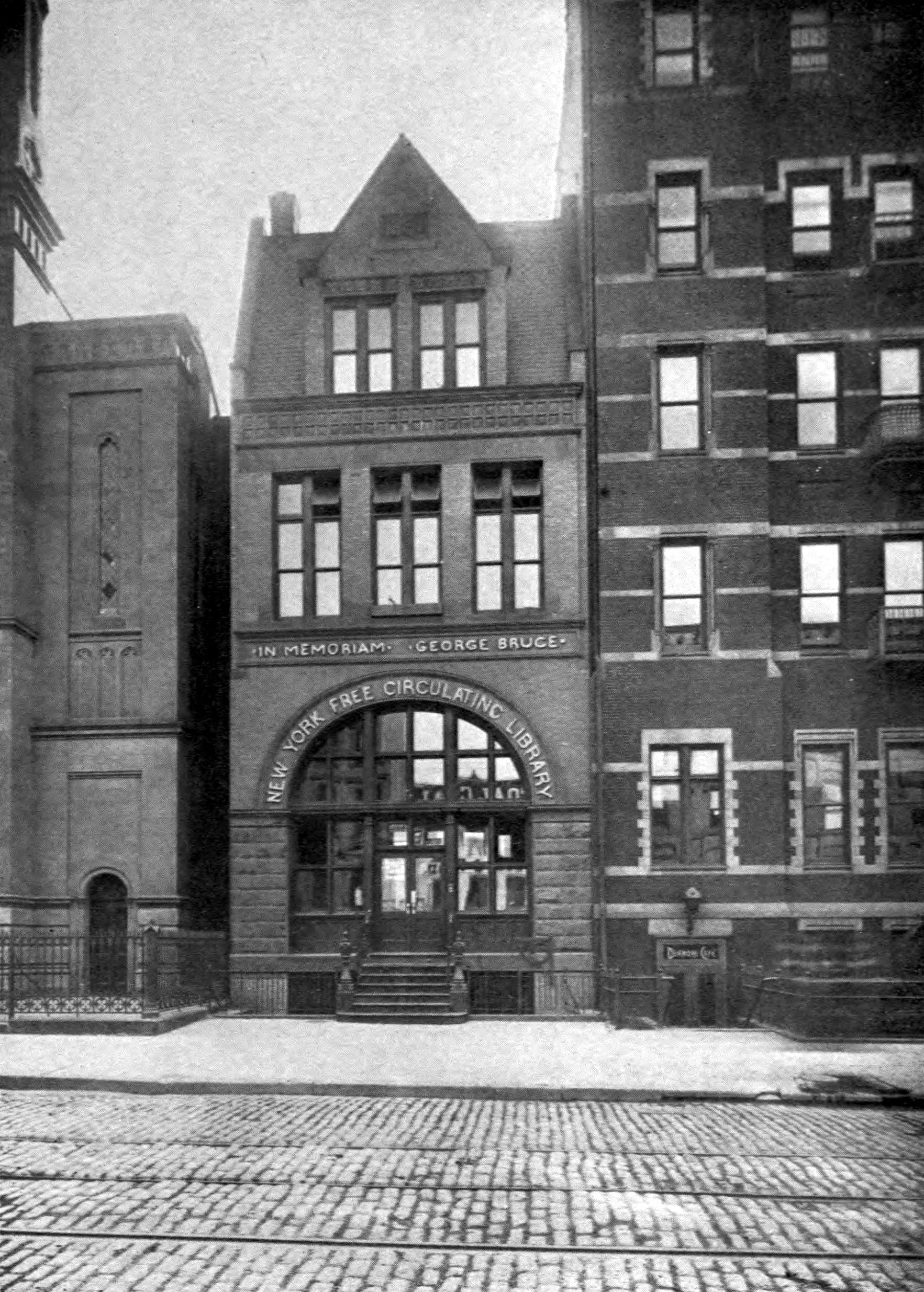
George Bruce Branch, 1888

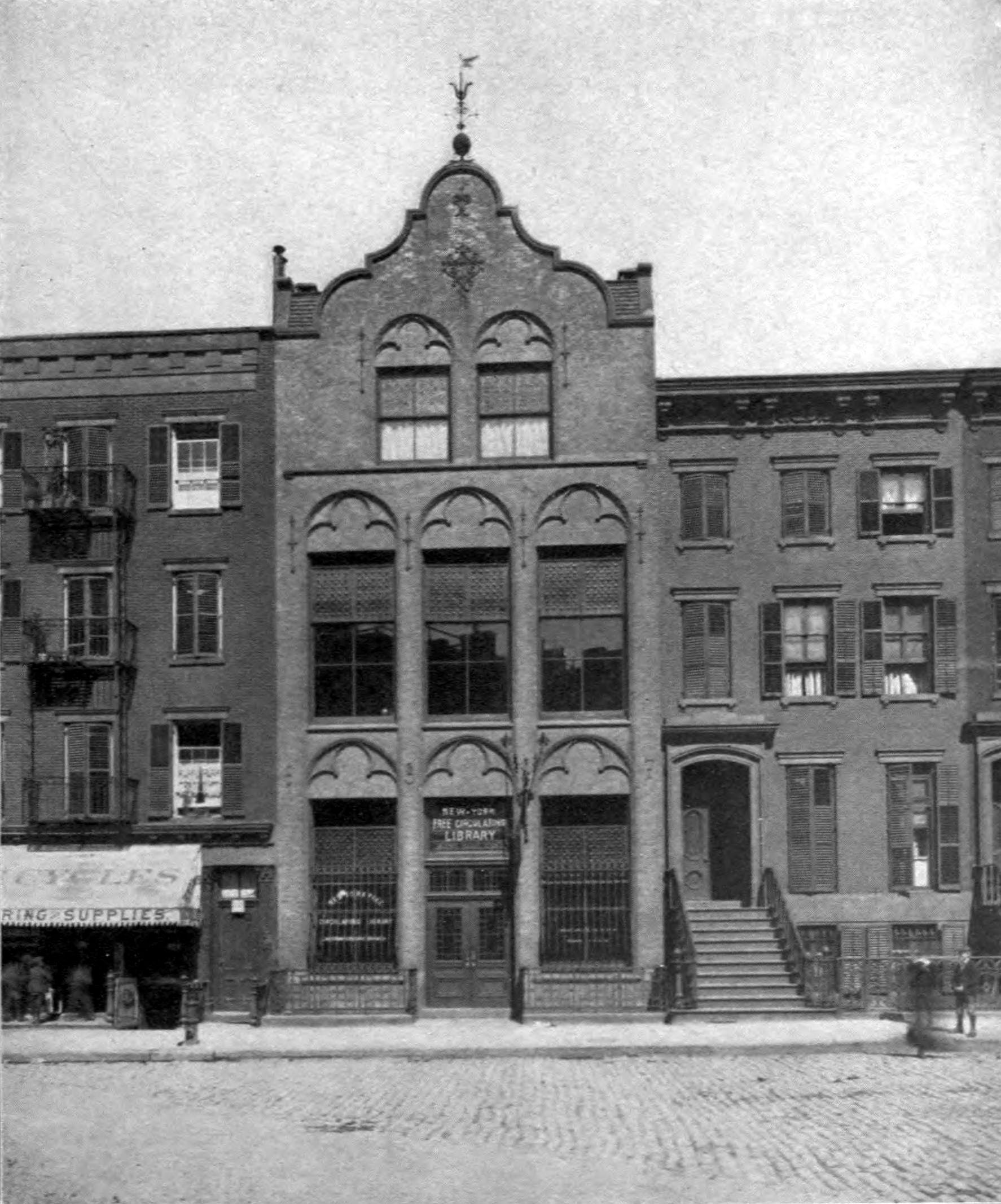
Jackson Square Branch, 1888

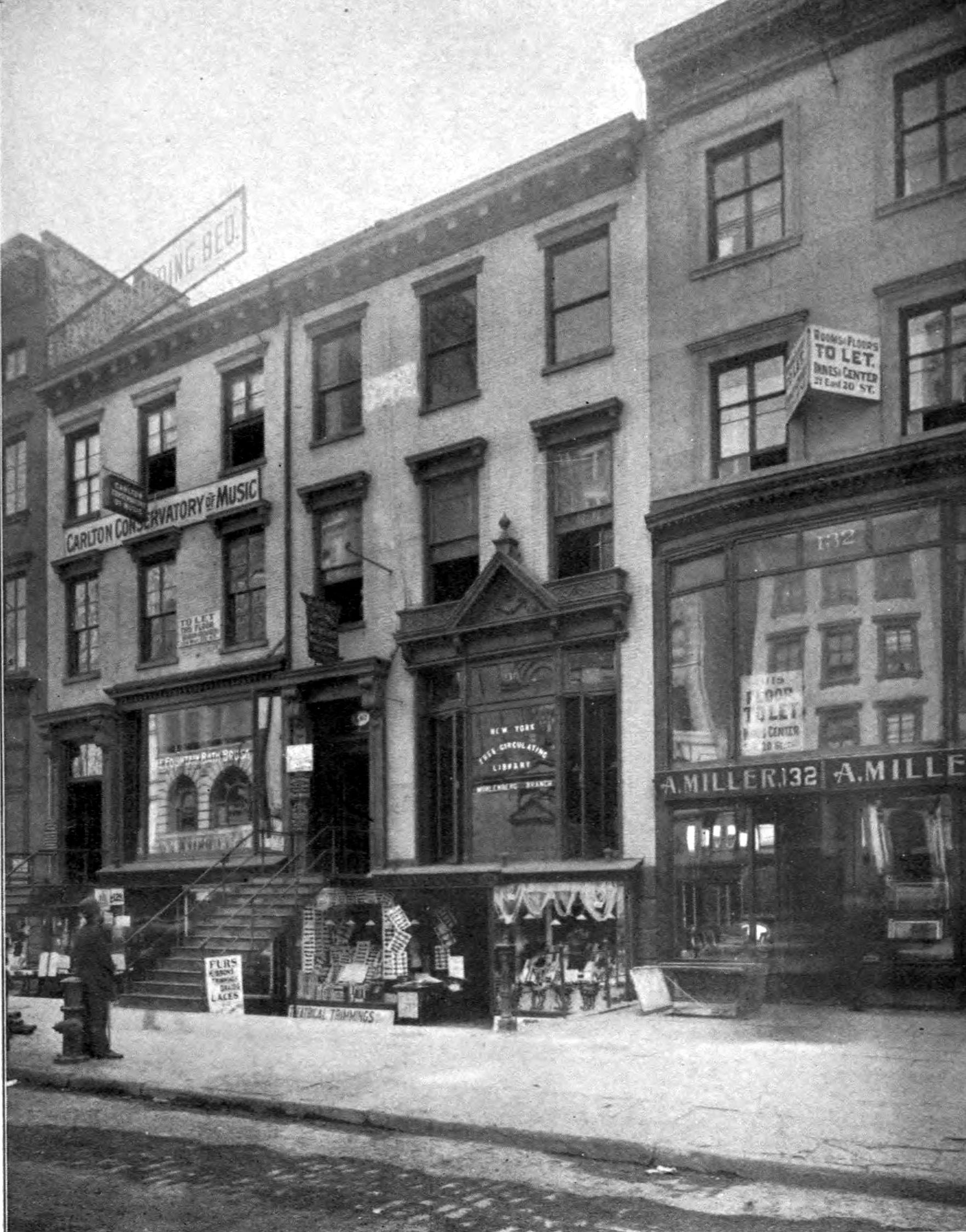
The Muhlenberg Branch at its 1898 location, 130 W. 23rd St

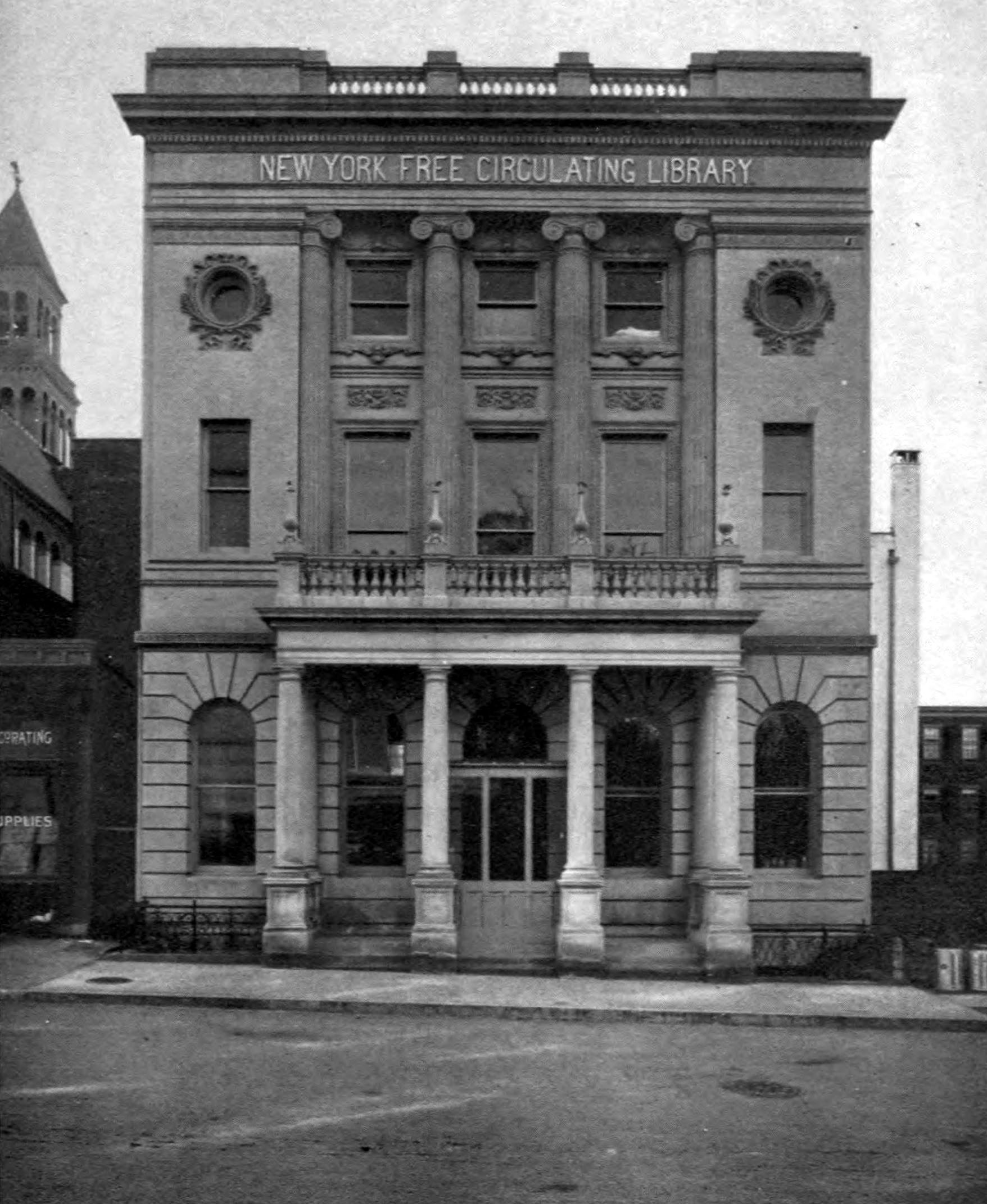
The Bloomingdale Branch at its 1898 location, 206 W. 100th St

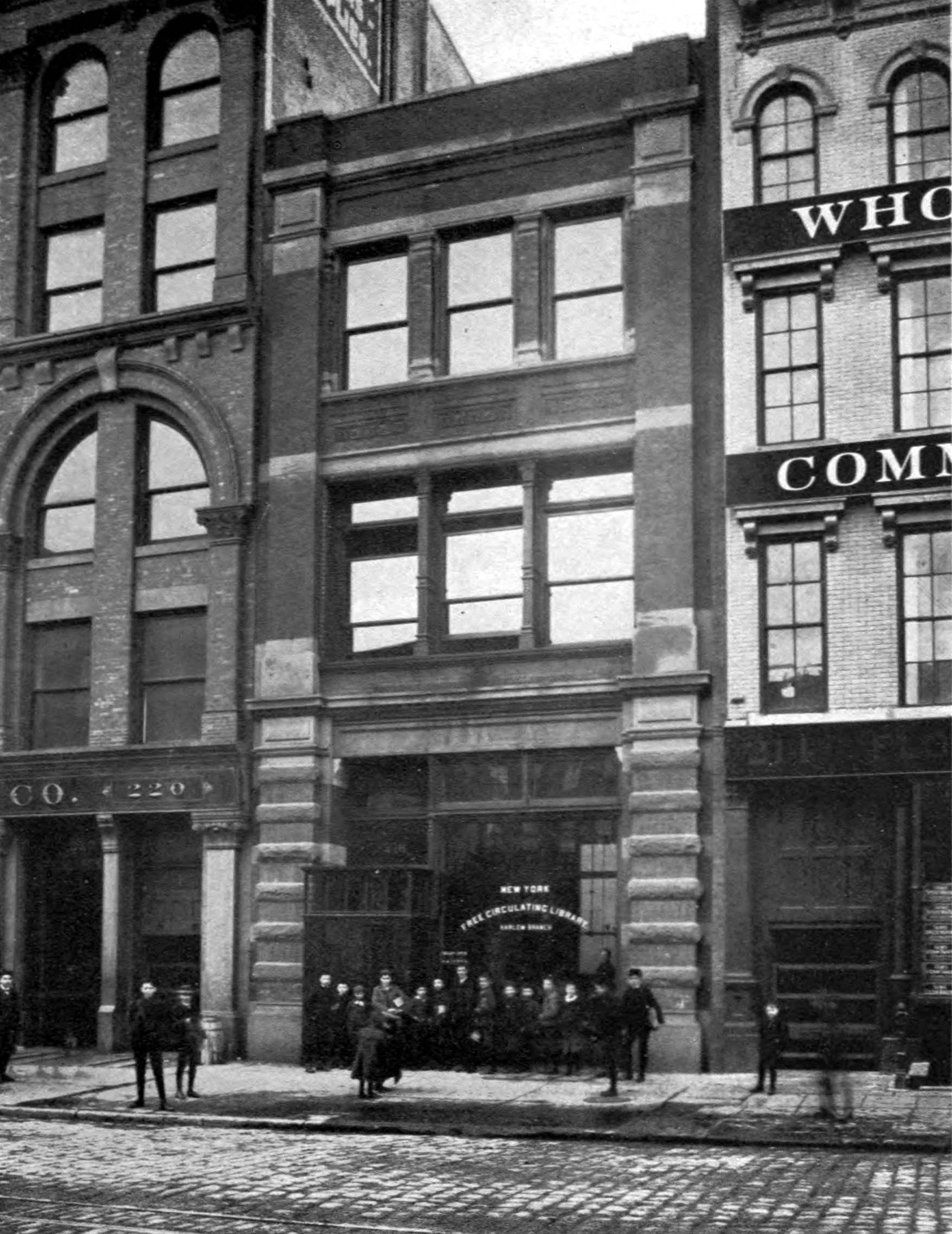
The Harlem Branch at its 1899 location, 218 East 125th St

The nucleus of a traveling library system had existed in the practice adopted by the NYFCL at an early period of its history by which it furnished to clubs, schools, or any responsible group of persons, a stock of books suitable for their needs, to be kept as long as needed. This work had become so extensive by 1897, that it was felt advisable to withdraw the issue for such purposes from the various branches and to concentrate it into a separate department. This was done in April 1897, the librarian of the George Bruce Branch undertaking it in addition to her duties as librarian in charge of that branch. In 1898 it was given a separate staff and was moved to the Ottendorfer Branch. In 1899 it was moved to the Bloomingdale Branch where the third floor was set aside for its needs.

The tenth branch building was opened on June 6, 1898, in rented quarters at 215 East 34th Street, in a remodelled dwelling house, where it occupied the whole building except the basement. The circulation room was located on the first floor, the reading room on the second, and the staff room and janitor's quarters on the third floor. The branch opened with 3,710 volumes on its shelves. For the first five months its circulation was 26,645 volumes, and the number of readers 1,045, three fourths of this number being children.

The use of the library by children was so marked that a separate room was set aside for them, and the success of the experiment here soon led to the establishment of separate children's rooms — long desired by every branch — at Ottendorfer, Bloomingdale, the new Harlem building, and the new Chatham Square Branch.

The last branch established by the NYFCL was opened on July 5, 1899, at 22 East Broadway in a remodelled dwelling house just off Chatham Square from which square it took its name. The general circulation room was located on the first floor and the children's room on the second. Each of these two departments had about 3,000 volumes at the time of opening, but of the 46,339 volumes circulated by the branch in the first four months 37,914 were taken out by the children. In memory of her friend Emily E. Binsse, lost in the shipwreck of La Bourgogne in July 1898, Susan Travers gave $1,000 for books for the children's room at Chatham Square and in addition she provided six interesting casts of sculpture.

With the increase in branches, circulation increased from 69,000 volumes during the first full year in the two small rooms at 36 Bond Street to 1,600,000 volumes for the eleven branches two decades later.

== Staffing ==
One of the most noteworthy facts is the part taken in the history of the NYFCL by women. The first president, the first secretary, the first chairman of the committee on ways and means, the first chairman of the building committee, and the first librarian were women. Of the forty trustees that served from 1880 to 1901, nineteen were women. The working staff was almost entirely feminine.

Chief Librarians

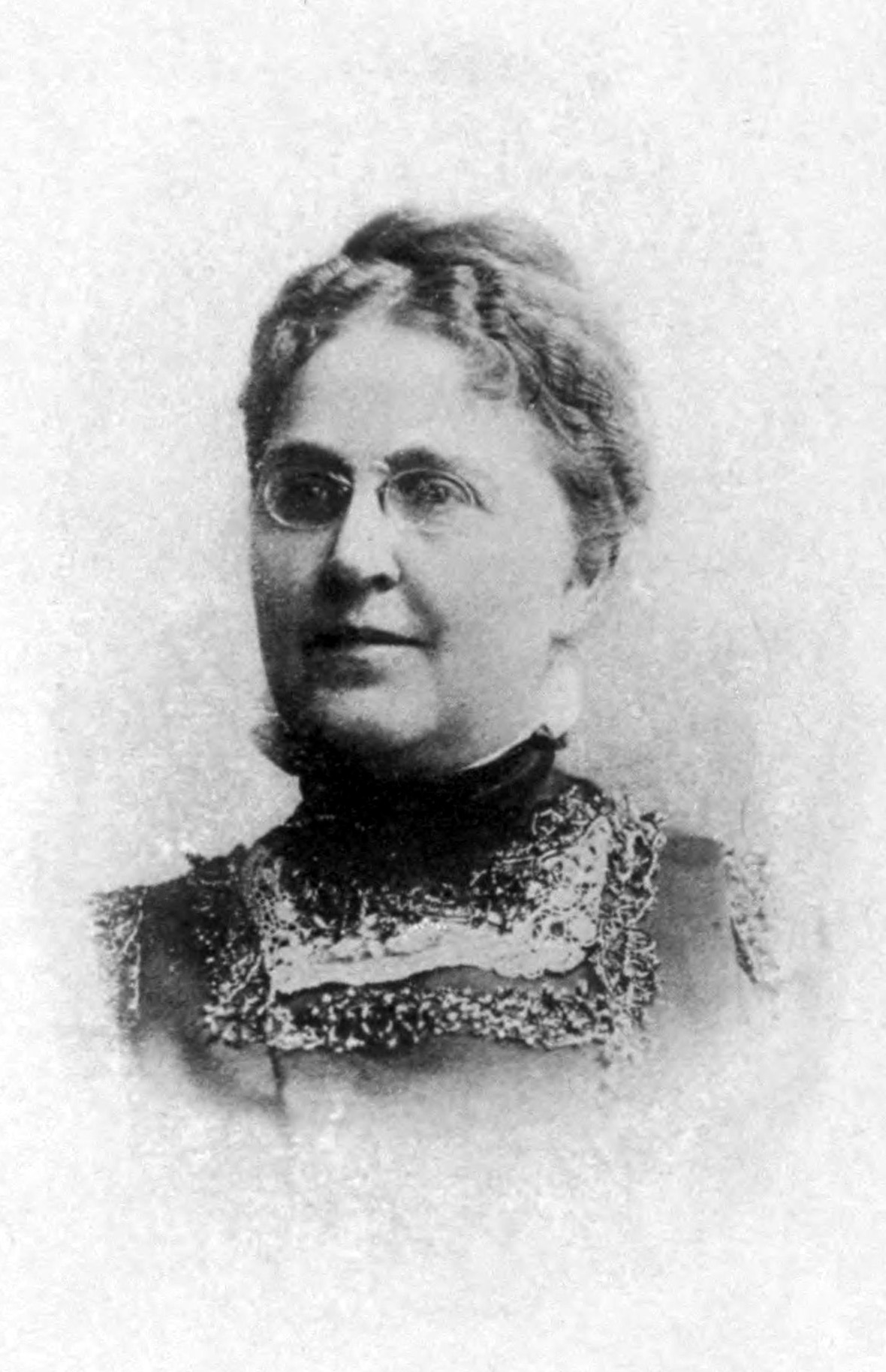
Ellen M. Coe
(1881–1895)

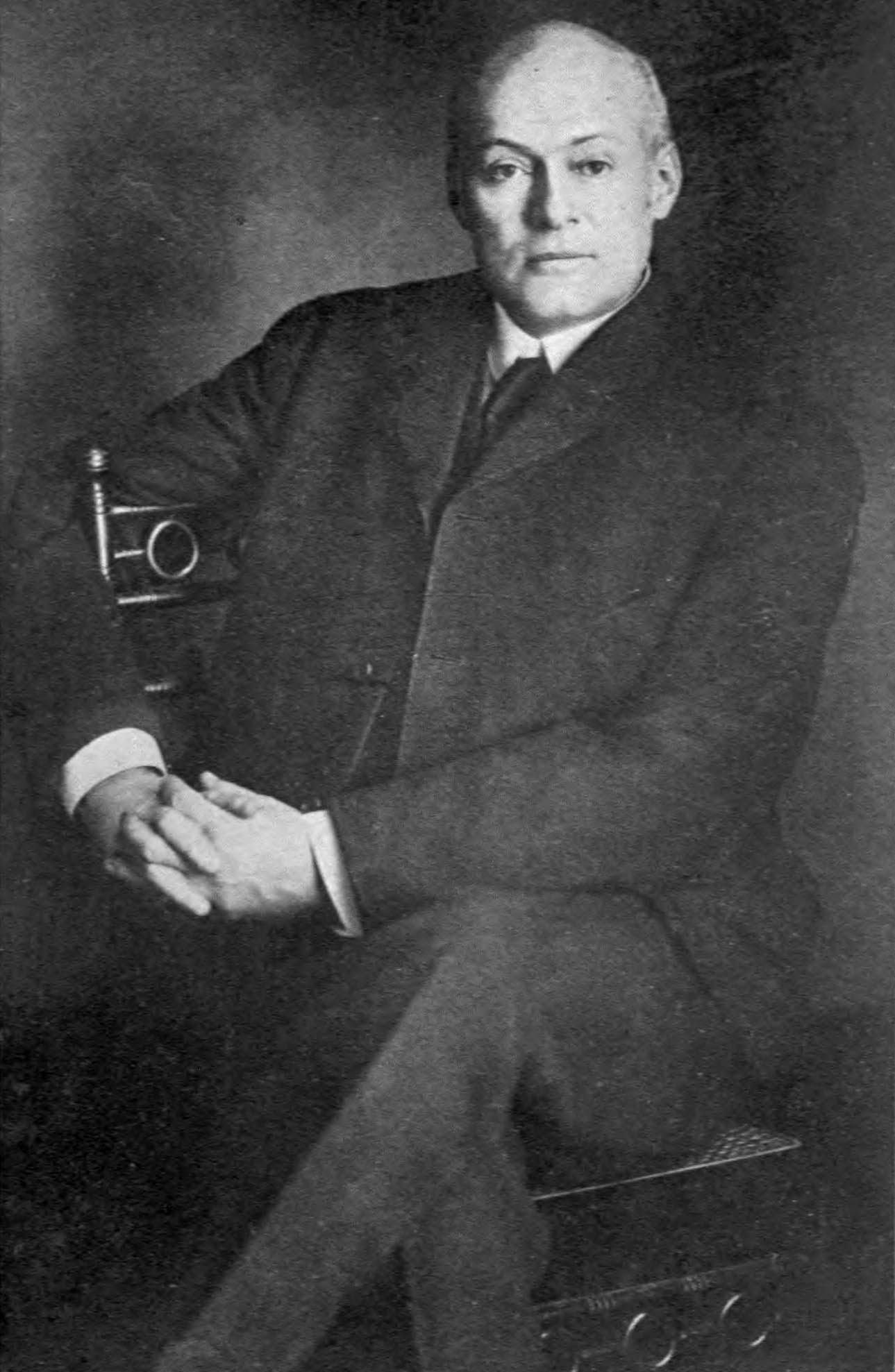
Arthur E. Bostwick
(1895–1899)

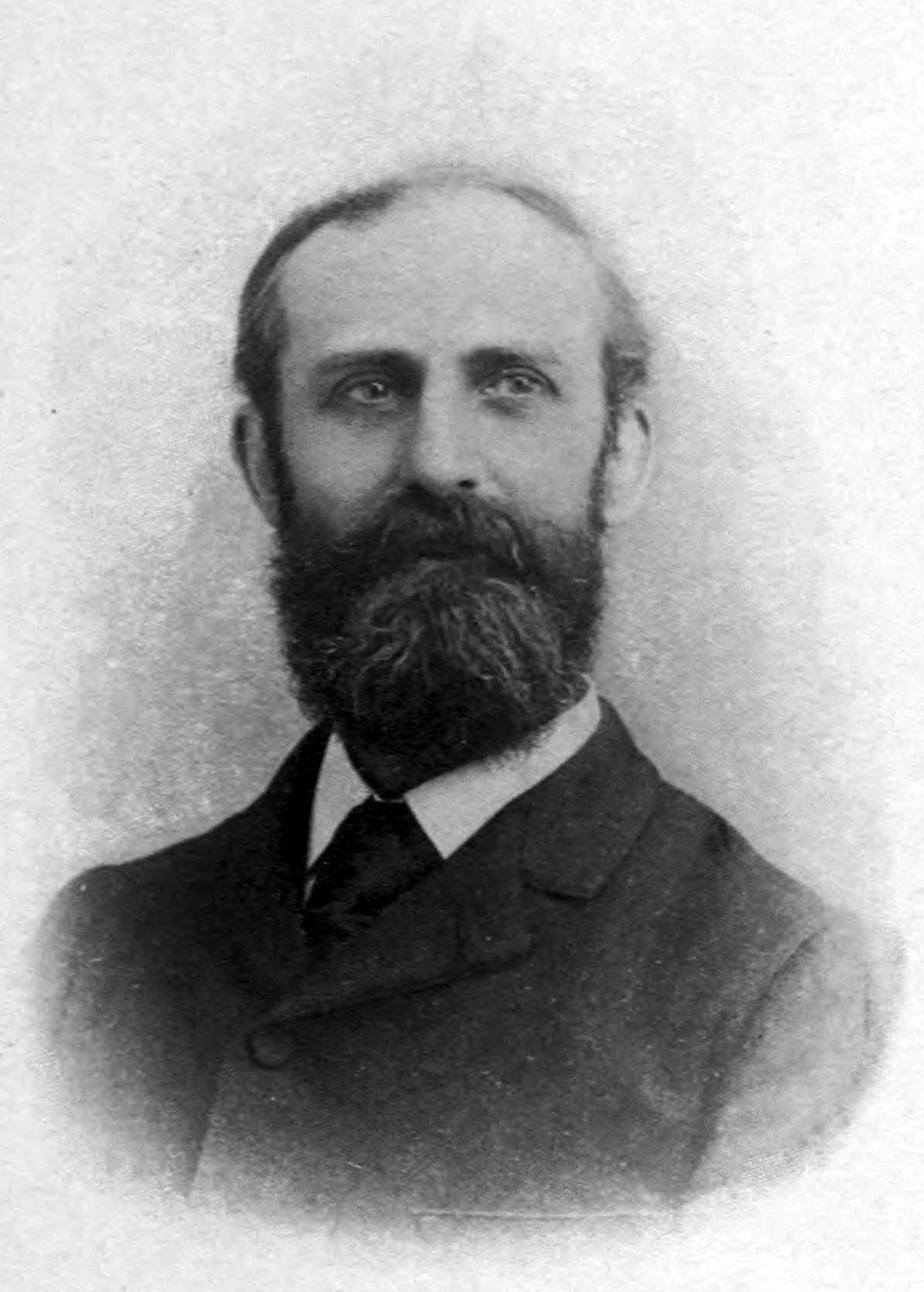
Norris Wing
(1899–1900)

The staff was put on a graded basis in March 1897, four classes, A, B, C, and D being formed, ranking downwards from A that for the librarians in charge of branches or departments. Promotion from lower to higher grades was made as result of examinations and of routine work. No formal examinations were required for admission to the staff, their place being taken in large measure by the answers to the questions called for on the application blank signed by the inquirer.

To provide a supply of trained assistants for the lower grades, an apprentice class was begun in February 1898. Applicants for positions were required to sign and fill in a blank form on which they gave a statement of their previous training and education and promised to give the library forty-five hours a week in return for the systematic training provided by this class. After a few weeks' preliminary work in instruction the apprentice was sent about from branch to branch, doing her share of the regular work, becoming familiar with local needs and customs, giving each librarian in charge an opportunity to observe her work. When a paid substitute was needed, she was taken from the apprentice class. When a vacancy on the permanent force was filled, the choice fell upon the best fitted apprentice. There was no seniority: the successful applicant sometimes showed her superior fitness by an apprenticeship of two weeks, sometimes service of months was required. A member was at liberty to leave at any time without notice, and one evidently unfitted for the work was so notified as soon as her unfitness was unmistakably evidenced.

There were four chief librarians during the 21 years of the life of the NYFCL. The first librarian, Mary J. Stubbs, combined the offices of librarian and housekeeper. With her sister, she lived in the building from March 1, 1880, to May, 1881, when ill health forced her to go home to Maine. She died in the autumn, and her sister served as acting librarian. Late in 1881, Ellen M. Coe was appointed librarian, and she filled the post for about 14 years, resigning in February 1895. Under her administration, five branches were added, and circulation grew from 69,000 to 650,000. On April 1, 1895, Arthur E. Bostwick, was appointed chief librarian. He left on March 8, 1899, and his successor, J. Norris Wing, was appointed April 7. Wing died December 20, 1900, and the position remained vacant until the NYFCL became part of the New York Public Library.
