= George Yuzawa =

Japanese-American community activist

- Born: February 21, 1915; Los Angeles, California, U.S.
- Died: October 2011 (aged 96)
- Occupation: Community activist
- Spouse: Kimiko Hattori (m. 1940)
- Children: 2

George Katsumi Yuzawa (Japanese: 湯沢 克巳, 1915–2011) was a Japanese-American community activist. He was involved in numerous social and political causes fighting racial discrimination against Asians and Asian Americans, providing aid for senior citizens, and organizing Japanese cultural events around New York City.

== Family and early life ==
George Katsumi Yuzawa was born in Los Angeles, California on February 21, 1915. His parents, Tamasaburo "James" and Bun "Mary" Yuzawa named their Nisei (second-generation Japanese American) son after George Washington. George's parents emigrated to the United States from Nagano, Japan. In 1917, James Yuzawa started the Vermont Flower Shop in downtown Los Angeles. He served a term as president of the Southern California Floral Association.

George was a founding member of Boy Scout Troop 64 in Los Angeles and achieved the rank of Life Scout. In 1932, he and other young Nisei establish the Japanese Athletic Union (JAU) to coordinate Nisei high school baseball, basketball, football and track competitions in southern California. He served as president of the JAU from 1935 to 1938. He graduated from Manual Arts High School in 1933 and attended Los Angeles City College where he earned an associate degree in Business. After college, George began working with his father.

In 1940, George married Kimiko Hattori (1917-2011). She was the 23-year-old Nisei daughter of Tora and Seikichi "Walter" Hattori. Walter was the proprietor of Nippon Produce Market in Los Angeles. He was also an official in a local southern California produce union.

== Japanese internment and World War II ==
After the attack on Pearl Harbor, President Franklin D. Roosevelt signed Executive Order 9066 on February 19, 1942. The Yuzawa and Hattori families were forcibly removed from their homes and incarcerated in concentration camps under the direction of the Wartime Civilian Control Agency (WCCA). They were among the 120,000 Americans of Japanese ancestry who were sent to ten concentration camps in the western and south central United States.

The Yuzawas and Hattoris lived with approximately 20,000 other Japanese Americans at the Santa Anita racetrack, a temporary detention facility converted from stables. George served as the assistant director of men's athletics at Santa Anita. In September 1942, they were moved to the Granada War Relocation Center in the southeastern region of Colorado, near the small town of Granada. The Center incarcerated over 7,000 persons of Japanese ancestry, the majority of whom were American citizens or longtime permanent U.S. residents who were ineligible for citizenship under American immigration laws. At the Center, George's father served as a block manager and George worked as the purchasing officer for the camp school system.

George's younger sister, 19-year-old Chieko "Patricia," was not permitted to go with her family to Santa Anita or the Granada War Relocation Center because she contracted tuberculosis shortly before the evacuation. The U.S. government moved her to Hillcrest Sanitarium located in the mountains of northwest Los Angeles. She died there in 1942, never having seen her parents again. During her stay, George was given permission to leave the camp (with an army escort) only once to visit her. After she died, George claimed her body.

In September 1943, the Wartime Relocation Authority (WRA) released George from the Center because he had promise of employment from the Annenberg and Erickson Florist Shop in New York City. Once in New York, George arranged for his wife and their parents to join him. In 1944, George volunteered for the U.S. Army. He completed his basic training at Fort McClellan in Alabama and was then attached to an Army Intelligence unit. George was stationed in Tokyo as part of the American Occupation of Japan, where he served as a special officer for entertainment for enlisted U.S. military servicemen. He received an honorable discharge in 1946 and returned to New York City.

George attended City College of New York from 1946 to 1947 on the G.I. Bill, earning a certificate in foreign trade. After forming and operating the HATCO Trading Company, Inc., George assisted his father's floral business, Park Central Florist. Clientele included actors, musicians, and Japanese businesses and corporations. George's father retired in the late 1950s due to ill health. George continued operating the shop until his own retirement in 1982.

== Social and political activism ==
George made the time to volunteer for social, religious, political, and other charitable work. In the early 1970s, he worked with other Nisei and Sansei (third-generation Japanese American) civil rights activists to combat racial discrimination against Asians. These activists included Mitziko Sawada (academic historian and author), Kazu Iijima, Min Matsuda, Kazu Obayashi and Tami Ogata (founders of Asian Americans for Action), Yuri Kochiyama (human rights activist), Suki Terada Ports (AIDS advocate), Michio Kaku (Princeton University theoretical physicist), and Aiko Herzig-Yoshinaga, who was instrumental in the Redress Movement for Japanese American incarceration.

=== Kenzo Takada and the ILGWU ===
This same core group of activists confronted Paris clothing designer, Kenzo Takada. Kenzo owned several worldwide boutiques, named "Société Jungle Jap," and used the trademarks "Kenzo of J.A.P." and "JAP" on his clothing. The group initiated a vigorous writing campaign to educate advertisers and department stores across the nation about Kenzo's use of the historically derogatory terminology, Jap. They demanded that newspapers like the New York Times stop accepting and printing Kenzo's advertisements and insisted that stores immediately stop selling his clothing. Despite this effort, some stores continued to carry Kenzo's line. In response, the activists organized a demonstration in front of the Bonwit Teller flagship store on Fifth Avenue and Macy's main department store at Herald Square. The New York City Commission on Human Rights assisted in this effort.

George asked Ruby Schaar, the president of the New York chapter of the Japanese American Citizens' League (JACL) for assistance. The chapter board contacted New York Nisei attorney Moonray Kojima who filed a lawsuit against Kenzo's Paris firm as well as its American distributor, Mallory Outerwear. The lawsuit sought to prohibit Kenzo from using either "JAP" or "J.A.P." on his labels and trademarks. On July 13, 1972, Kenzo agreed to stop using both "JAP" and "J.A.P." An entire Butterick Patterns shipment with the word JAP was recalled in 1972. The Butterick Fashion Marketing Company also agreed to remove "J.A.P." from its Kenzo-designed patterns and from their catalog.

George and this same group protested the ILGWU's (International Ladies Garment Workers Union) implied anti-Japanese racism in its "Buy American" campaign. During the late summer and early autumn of 1972, the ILGWU produced a series of subway posters that contained anti-Japanese themes. One of the more provocative posters depicted a U.S. flag with the caption, "Made in Japan." Underneath the "Made in Japan" caption in smaller lettering was the question: "Has your job been exported to Japan yet?" George and other activists physically removed the posters from subway trains. In October 1972, about 100 people participated in a rally in front of ILGWU headquarters. Professor Michio Kaku was the rally spokesperson. Later that autumn, George met with ILGWU officials and they negotiated an agreement to remove the posters.

The Kenzo and ILGWU incidents prompted George and others to organize Asian Americans for Fair Media, Inc. (AAFM) in 1973. This group of Nisei volunteers monitored local and national broadcasts and print media for negative Asian stereotypes and racial slurs. In 1973, the AAFM published a booklet entitled Stereotypes and Realities: The Asian Image in the United States. In 1974, the Eastern Regional Office of the U.S. Commission on Civil Rights asked George to serve as a consultant.

=== Causes for senior citizens ===
George also devoted much of his time attending to the needs of senior citizens. In 1965, he organized the Ad Hoc Committee of Concerned Asians in New York City to address the housing needs of Issei (first-generation Japanese American) and Nisei senior citizens. During the early 1970s, with a grant from The New York Community Trust (NYCT), Concerned Asians conducted a survey to assess the needs of these senior citizens living in New York City. The findings convinced George and other committee members that a permanent organization was needed to support the aging Nisei community.

George helped establish the Japanese American Help for the Aging, Inc. (JAHFA) in 1974. JAHFA was a non-profit organization that provided health, educational, informational, language, and social services to the elderly Japanese community in New York City. JAHFA located senior residential housing at the Methodist Home in Riverdale and began placing Issei and Nisei seniors there in 1974. In the early 1980s, JAHFA became a standing committee of the Japanese American Association of New York (JAA), to secure additional financial and manpower resources.

In the mid-1980s, George formed an affiliation with the Isabella Geriatric Center in upper Manhattan. Isabella offered both a nursing home and resident apartments for seniors. He formed an exchange program between eldercare professionals from Japan and the staff at Isabella.

George also helped to form the West Side Federation for Senior Housing, Inc., (WSFSH), due to the large population of Issei and Nisei residing on the West Side of Manhattan. George served on the organization's board of directors. Founded in 1977, the WSFSH assisted with the distribution of funds from federal and private sources to local residential construction projects on the Upper West Side.

=== Redress of Japanese internment ===
In 1981, George served as a member of the East Coast Japanese Americans for Redress organization, which advised the federal Commission on Wartime Relocation and Internment of Civilians. He helped organize the November 1981 commission hearings in New York City. The hearings in turn helped shape the Civil Liberties Act of 1988 in which President Ronald Reagan and the U.S. Congress apologized for the forced removal and incarceration of Japanese American citizens and permanent residents, authorized the payment of $20,000 to each victim who was still alive, and allocated $50 million for a public education fund.

=== Japanese cultural education ===
George served as a vice president, board member, and committee chair for the Japanese American Association of New York (JAA), and organized numerous Japanese cultural, educational, and preservation activities in New York City. Between 1968 and 2001, George helped plan cultural celebrations such as Nipponanza at the Beacon Theatre in 1979. Nipponanza was part of a nationwide festival featuring Japanese arts and culture.

In 1980, George coordinated the renovation of a Japanese burial plot at Willow Grove Cemetery in New Brunswick, New Jersey. Established in 1870, the plot contains the remains of eight Japanese who died during the 1870s and 1880s and who were among the earliest Japanese settlers in the tristate region.

In 1982, George and the JAA helped establish the annual spring Sakura Matsuri Cherry Blossom Festival at the Brooklyn Botanic Garden. This festival continues to the present day. During the summer of 1985, George also served on the New York-Tokyo Sister City Committee, helping to plan events that celebrated the 25th anniversary of the New York-Tokyo sister city relationship. He and then JAA president, Shigeru Inagaki, helped raise 168 Japanese cherry trees between 1992 and 2001 in Van Cortlandt Park. In April 2001, the trees were donated to New York City and transplanted to Cherry Hill Slope, where they constitute the George Yuzawa Grove.

=== Religious causes ===
A devout Methodist, he negotiated the sale of the Japanese Methodist-Episcopal Church building following the church's merger with two other congregations. In 1969 and 1970, he helped design the interior of the then-new Japanese American United Church building. He also provided leadership as a longtime chair and member of the church's board of directors.

=== Other associations ===
George worked with the Japanese American National Museum in Los Angeles to develop an Ellis Island exhibit called "America's Concentration Camps." He was also a founding member of the Asian & Pacific Islander Coalition on HIV/AIDS (APICHA), a member of the National Parks Conservation Association, and an advisor to Harmonia Opera. In addition, George was a charter member of the Japanese American Lions Club of New York, a member and president of the Nisei Investors of New York, and a Day of Remembrance Committee member.

== Awards ==
George received many commendations for his years of service, including the Governor's Award for Excellence from New York Governor George Pataki and an invitation to the White House from President Jimmy Carter. In 1983, the Emperor of Japan awarded George the Order of the Sacred Treasure, 5th Class, for his service on behalf of both Japanese and non-Japanese people.

George and his wife Kimi had two children, Gene and Pat Yuzawa-Rubin, and three grandchildren. George died in October 2011. Kimi died in November 2011.
