= 6-15-99 Club =

The 6-15-99 Club was an organization dedicated to assisting the plight of the poor in New York City in the 1890s. The group formed branch clubs in stores, factories, and banks, expanding at a rapid rate. Employed members were expected to contribute between a penny and two and a half cents to the club daily. William De Hertburn (W. d'H.) Washington, of 145 Broadway, and prominent Manhattan businessmen envisioned raising around $13,000 daily. Isidor Straus, Oswald Ottendorfer, and former New York City mayor Franklin Edson were proponents of the 6-15-99 Club.

== History ==
In February 1894 plans were being made to open a 6-15-99 store at 14th Street near 5th Avenue. This site was to be used as an office intended to find employment for persons who desired to work. Tasks assigned to job seekers included furniture repair and basic carpentry work. The 6-15-99 Club asked that persons who needed such services, make their requests either at the 14th Street store or at 145 Broadway. An additional store was anticipated to open at 125th Street. By April 1894 there were 270 branches of the 6-15-99 Club.

By early 1894 the 6-15-99 Club had secured employment for a number of women who worked making quality garments for children. Sizable retail stores accepted the items manufactured by the women, so that a portion of the work performed by the 6-15-99 Club was self-supporting. The free labor bureau of the 6-15-99 Club obtained work for 105 applicants in one week.

According to a periodical from 1894, the 6-15-99 Club was one of seven contemporary and highly advertised funds for the temporary relief of the destitute. The others were those organized by Tammany Hall, New York City officials and employees, the World's Bread Fund, the New York Herald's Free Clothing Fund, the Christian Herald Fund, and the New York Tribune Coal and Food Fund.

In 1894, the Journal of Social Science questioned the sincerity of the funds, stating that they were "managed at the caprice of their projectors", and stated that the City of New York made no increase in its appropriations to its Board of Charities and Correction in 1894, except for a small amount for coal. However, it reported that the city possessed funds totaling $2,414,283 which could have been provided to needy persons in most years. If distributed among the 50,000 people who qualified for relief, this would have averaged out to $48.30 per person. The totals took into account half of the migrant and homeless people which the journal described as exceptional excess for 1894.
