= Isabella Geriatric Center =

American non-profit organization

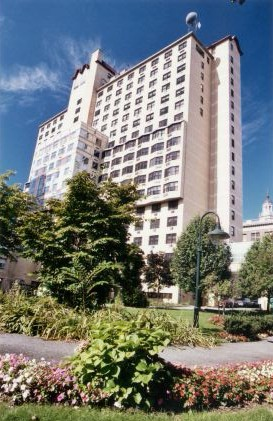
Isabella 515 Audubon Avenue campus

Isabella Geriatric Center is a non-profit, nonsectarian organization that has provided residential and community-based services for elderly residents of New York City since 1875. The main campus is located in the Washington Heights neighborhood of Manhattan at 515 Audubon Avenue at the corner of 190th Street.

== History ==
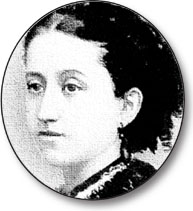
Isabella Uhl 1846 - 1873

When Anna and Oswald Ottendorfer opened the first home in 1875, they named it in honor of Anna's daughter, Isabella Uhl, whose early death at the age of 27 cut short her career in caring for the poor. Isabella had been impressed by the precarious position of aged women without home or family. When confined to bed, Isabella expressed to her mother the wish that she establish an institution to ensure these women refuge and protection. Two years after Isabella's death, Anna Ottendorfer opened Isabella Heimath in Astoria, Queens. The home was originally dedicated to the care of indigent elderly women, per Isabella Uhl's wishes. Isabella Home moved to its present location in 1889 and simultaneously expanded its mission to care for both women and men, without regard to race, creed or nationality.

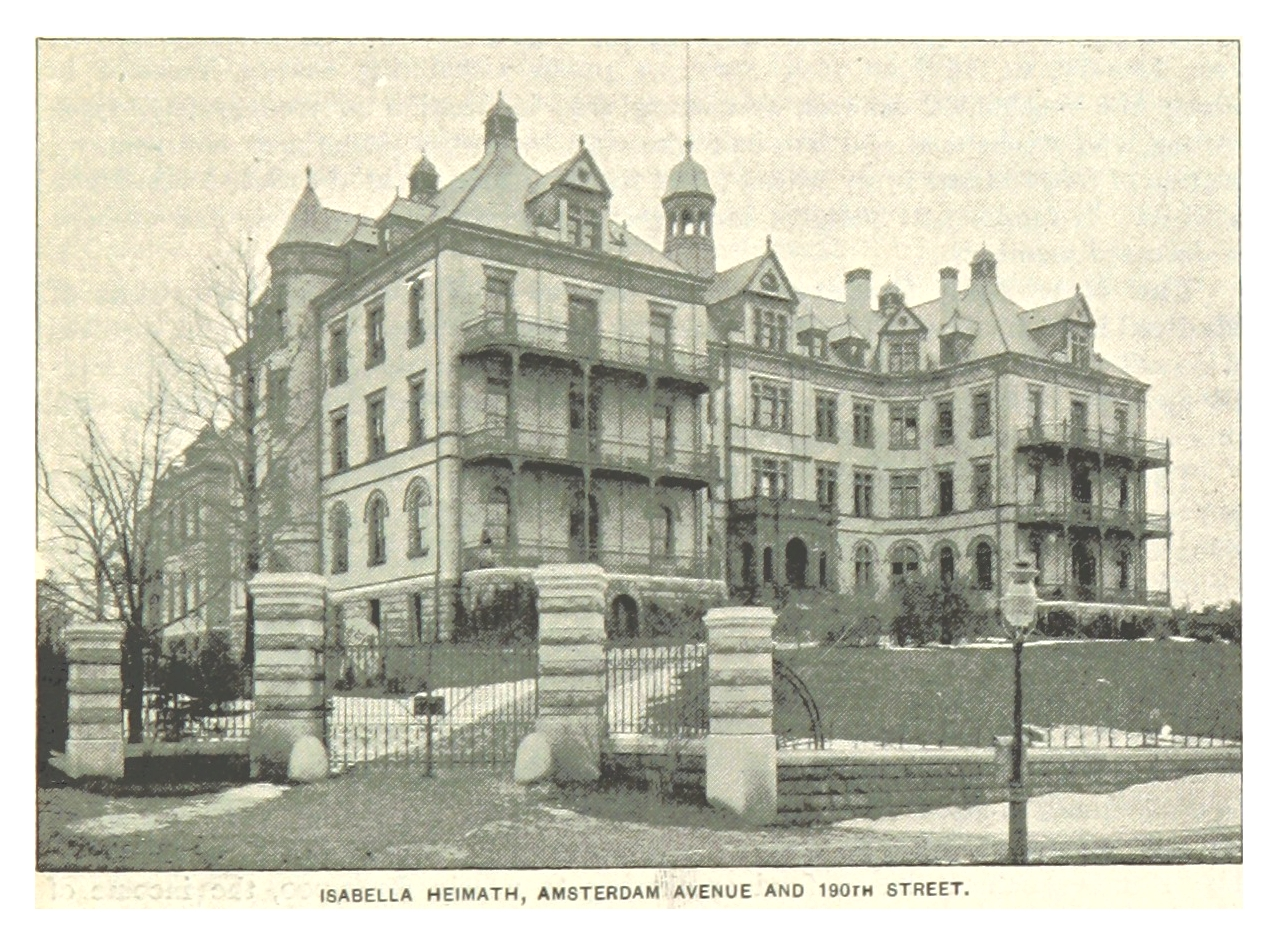
ISABELLA HEIMATH, AMSTERDAM AVENUE AND 190TH STREET Ca 1890

In 1899, the United States Commission to the Paris exposition of 1900 requested that Isabella Heimath provide photographs for an exhibition on American Charities. For this submission, the home was awarded the silver medal for excellence of its building, services and purposes.

After 76 years Isabella outgrew its capacity of 132 residents and the Board of Managers moved to make provisions for more space and expanded services. On December 7, 1965, Nelson A. Rockefeller, then Governor of New York State, dedicated Isabella House, a 17-story building containing 12 floors of furnished apartments, three floors of nursing care and two floors for services and public spaces.

The House provided independent living for approximately 250 aged residents. This affordable housing residence for the well elderly was a new concept in institutional care for the aged. At the time, it was the first housing program for the elderly which offered medical and nursing care and a package of social services in a setting where personal freedom and independence was assured.

The growth from 132 to approximately 500 residents made it apparent that the original Isabella Home needed to be replaced. Consequently, on April 3, 1972, the 14-story Isabella Nursing Home building was opened. The combination of facility and program expansion in the next few decades helped to create the present day Isabella Geriatric Center. The 1990s once again called for changes and new goals; Isabella began a move to create a more home-like ambiance for residents.

For 25 years, from 1991 to 2016, Isabella offered a child care center that, along with the geriatric center provided a unique inter-generational program that benefited both the children served and the residents. In June 2016 Isabella abruptly closed the child care center with little notice.

=== COVID-19 ===
A total of 98 people may have died from COVID-19 at the Isabella Geriatric Center. On April 30, 2020, after U.S. Congressman Adriano Espaillat made a complaint, New York Attorney General Letitia James announced that her office would investigate the center; the investigation found that the nursing home drastically underreported its COVID-19 deaths.

== Current work ==
Today, Isabella is a large complex offering a diversity of services. In addition to a 705-bed nursing home, Isabella offers independent senior housing, adult day health care, home care, short- and long-term rehabilitation and a variety of community programs designed to help older adults remain healthy while living at home.

Other community-based programs include:

- Naturally Occurring Retirement Community (NORC) Programs
- Senior Resource Center
- Institute for Older Adults (50+ Club and Walking Works Wonders)
- Career Training
- Upper Manhattan Partnership for Senior Independence
- Caregiver Support Programs

=== Person centered care model ===
The Isabella Geriatric Center and Cobble Hill Health Center have been engaged in an ongoing collaboration to explore new ways to enhance person centered care and to construct a model that uses performance improvement approaches to guide staff in addressing the needs and preferences of residents.

They have published a manual on culture change and person-centered care for nursing home staffs, "Getting Better All the Time", which provides practical guidance.

=== Nursing home certifications ===
Isabella is a Medicare and Medicaid Certified Nursing Home.

=== Facility locations ===
- The main campus, located at 515 Audubon Avenue (190th Street) houses Isabella's Nursing Home and Rehabilitation services and Independent Senior Housing.
- Isabella's Senior Resource Center is located at 4026 Broadway (169th Street), New York, NY. Seniors can visit the center with questions about government benefit programs, health insurance and to be connected with other community programs.
- Isabella's Home Care program, free Home Health Aide training and other community programs are run at the 5073 Broadway (216th Street) campus.

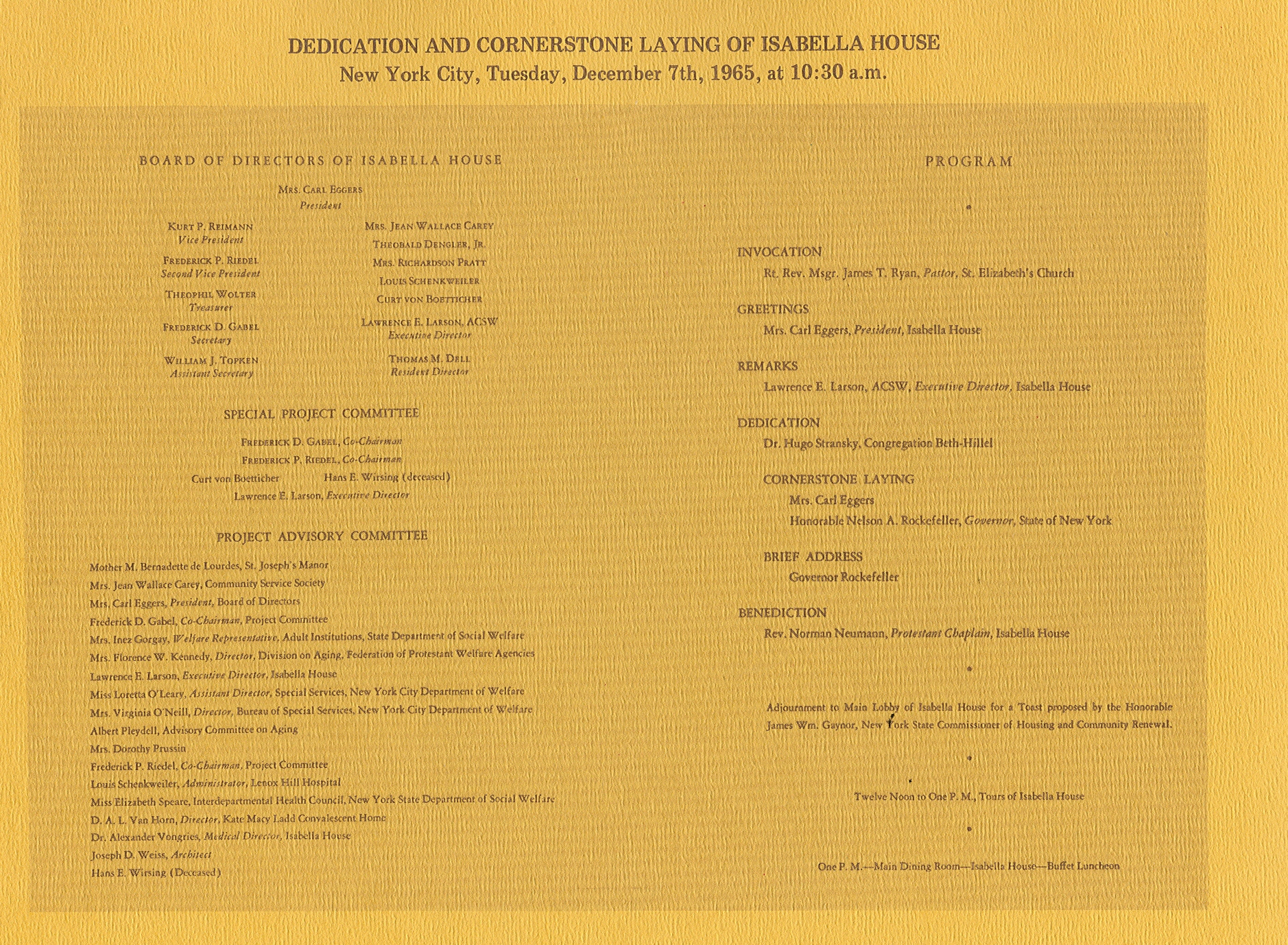
Dedication of Isabella House 1965

=== Affiliations ===
Isabella is a member of the following organizations:

- Adult Day Health Care Council
- Alliance Continuing Care Network
- American Association of Homes and Services for the Aging
- American Association of Nurse Assessment Coordinators
- American Geriatrics Society
- American Society on Aging
- Continuing Care Leadership Coalition (CCLC)
- Council of Senior Centers and Services of New York City
- Federation of Protestant Welfare Agencies
- Gerontological Society of America
- New York Association of Homes and Services for the Aging
- New York State Home Care Association

== See also ==
- Wartburg Adult Care Community
