= Anna Ottendorfer =

American journalist

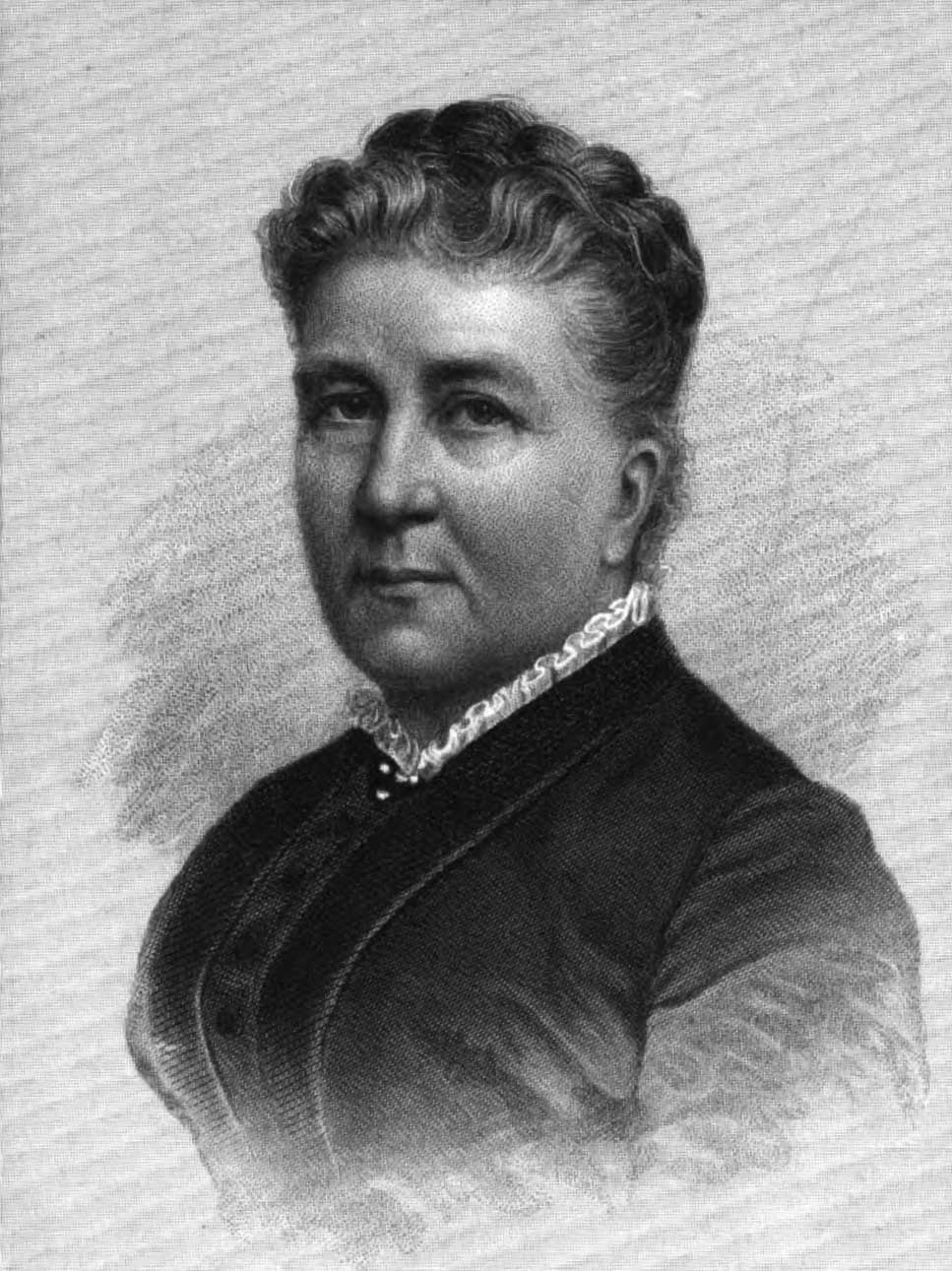
- Ottendorfer circa 1865
- Born: Anna Behr; February 13, 1815; Würzburg, Bavaria
- Died: April 1, 1884 (aged 69); New York City, United States

Anna Ottendorfer (13 February 1815 Würzburg, Bavaria - 1 April 1884 New York City) was a German-American journalist and philanthropist. She was associated with the development of the German-language New Yorker Staats-Zeitung into a major newspaper.

== Early life ==
Ottendorfer was born the daughter of a poor man named Behr. She came to the United States in 1837, and remained for a year with her brother in Niagara County, New York.

== Journalism ==
In 1838, Ottendorfer married Jacob Uhl, a printer. In 1845, her husband purchased the New Yorker Staats-Zeitung, an influential and growing tri-weekly German-language newspaper owned and edited by Gustav Adolph Neumann. Jacob Uhl's young wife helped him constantly, and, after a brief period, they were able to issue the publication daily. When, in 1852, Jacob Uhl died, leaving Anna Uhl with six children and a daily paper, she assumed the management of the paper. She declined several offers for the Staats-Zeitung, and, by her own energy and sagacity and the co-operation of Oswald Ottendorfer, who became editor in 1858 and whom Anna married in 1859, made it one of the chief papers in the United States. By the 1870s, its circulation was comparable to English-language newspapers like the New York Tribune and The New York Times. Anna Ottendorfer took an active part in the management of the paper until almost the time of her death.

In 1879, the property of the company was changed into a stock company. At Anna Ottendorfer's suggestion, the employees were provided with a 10% dividend on their annual salary. Later this was increased to 15%.

== Philanthropy ==
Ottendorfer devoted much attention to charitable enterprises, her main interests being the welfare of women and children and German culture.

In 1875, she established the Isabella Home for Aged Women in Astoria, Long Island (now Isabella Geriatric Center), named in memory of her deceased daughter, expending $150,000 on the building and endowment. She contributed $40,000 to an educational fund, built the women's pavilion of the German Hospital, New York City, at a cost of $75,000, and gave $100,000 for the German Dispensary. In 1883, Ottendorfer received a gold medal from the Empress Augusta of Germany in recognition of her aid to flood victims in that country in 1882 and 1883. In her will, she left additional sums for her charitable foundations, and bequeathed $25,000 to the employees of the Staats-Zeitung.

== Death ==
Ottendorfer died at her home at 7 East 17th Street. A son and three daughters survived her. Two of her children had died, Hermann Uhl and Isabella Uhl. The surviving children were Emma Schalk; Edward Uhl, who succeeded as business manager at the Staats-Zeitung; Mathilde von Riedl; and Anna Woerishoffer. She had no children with Oswald Ottendorfer. Her funeral was the largest up to that time for a woman in New York City; the eulogy was by Carl Schurz. She left an estate of $3,000,000 and was buried in Green-Wood Cemetery.

Her granddaughter Carola Woerishoffer was a labor activist and a major donor to Bryn Mawr College. Her great-grandson Antoine Seilern was an art collector.
