= Ottendorfer Public Library and Stuyvesant Polyclinic Hospital =

Historic buildings in Manhattan, New York

- U.S. National Register of Historic Places
- New York City Landmark
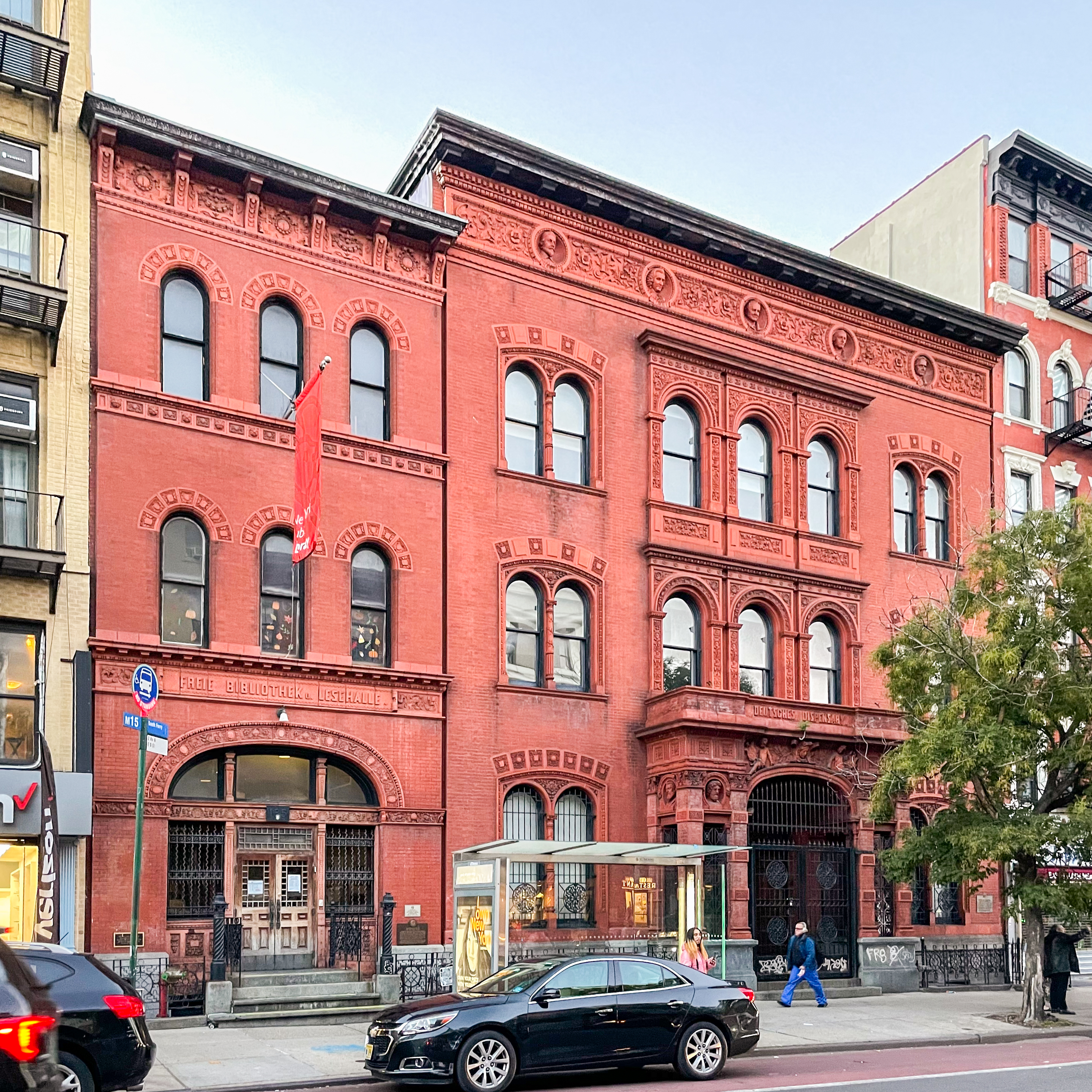
- Ottendorfer Public Library (left) and Stuyvesant Polyclinic Hospital (right)
- Location: 135 and 137 2nd Avenue, Manhattan, New York
- Coordinates: 40°43′47″N 73°59′15″W
- Built: 1883-84
- Architect: William Schickel
- Architectural style: Late Victorian; Queen Anne; Italian Renaissance Revival
- NRHP reference No.: 79001607
- NYCL No.: 0924, 0969, 1168

Significant dates
- Added to NRHP: July 22, 1979
- Designated NYCL: Hospital: November 9, 1976; Library: September 20, 1977; Library interior: August 11, 1981

The Ottendorfer Public Library and Stuyvesant Polyclinic Hospital are a pair of historic buildings at 135 and 137 Second Avenue in the East Village neighborhood of Manhattan in New York City. The buildings house the Ottendorfer Branch of the New York Public Library, as well as the women's workspace The Wing within the former Stuyvesant Polyclinic hospital until the company's cessation of operations in 2022.

The buildings were jointly designed by German-born architect William Schickel in the neo-Italian Renaissance style. Both structures are three stories tall with a facade of Philadelphia pressed brick facades ornamented in terracotta. The hospital building features terracotta busts of several notable medical professionals.

The structures were erected in 1883–84 following a donation by philanthropists Oswald Ottendorfer and Anna Ottendorfer. The library was the second branch of the New York Free Circulating Library, while the hospital was affiliated with the German Hospital uptown, now Lenox Hill Hospital. Both structures served the Little Germany enclave of Lower Manhattan. The hospital was sold in 1906 to another medical charity, the German Polyklinik; the name was changed to Stuyvesant Polyclinic in the 1910s. The buildings were restored numerous times in their history. The structures received three separate New York City landmark designations in 1976, 1977, and 1981, and were added to the National Register of Historic Places in 1979.

== History ==
In the late 19th century, the modern East Village and the Lower East Side neighborhoods of Lower Manhattan collectively became known as "Little Germany" (German: Kleindeutschland) because of the large concentration of German immigrants in the neighborhoods. The German Dispensary was founded on the Lower East Side in 1857. The German Dispensary was one of many dispensaries to be founded in New York City during the mid-19th century, and it provided free medical care to the area's German immigrants on the model of the Northern Dispensary in Greenwich Village. After the dispensary's charter was changed in 1866, the Lower East Side dispensary became a branch of the German Hospital, now the Lenox Hill Hospital, whose main location was on the Upper East Side.

The city also had numerous private libraries, such as the Astor Library and Lenox Library, but few libraries for the general public, especially for immigrants and the poor. One of the first general-public libraries to be established in New York City was the New York Free Circulating Library (NYFCL), having been incorporated in 1880, with its first branch opening on Bond Street in Lower Manhattan that year.

=== Construction ===
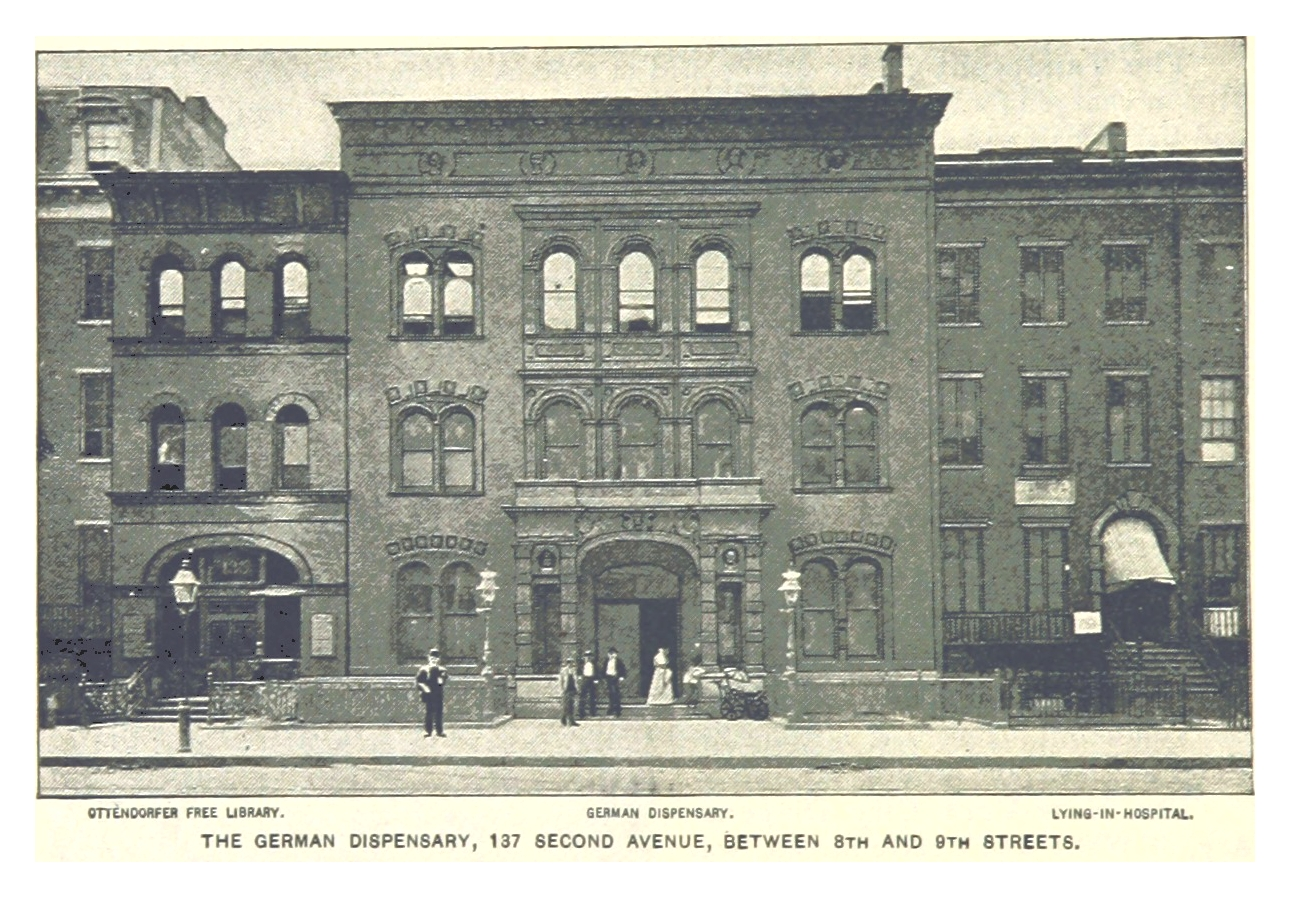
The buildings in 1893

Oswald Ottendorfer, a German immigrant and publisher of the New Yorker Staats-Zeitung, the city's largest German-language newspaper, and his wife Anna Ottendorfer had acquired the land for the buildings in 1883. Initially, only the clinic was proposed to be built on the site. However, the clinic would occupy only part of the Ottendorfer plot, so Anna Ottendorfer proposed building a branch of the NYFCL on the additional plot, retaining ownership of the land. The Ottendorfers intended to construct the buildings as a gift to the city, and Anna Ottendorfer personally selected William Schickel as the architect of the buildings. Plans were filed by May 1883, with the buildings projected to cost $75,000. Of the couple, Oswald was more closely involved with the library, personally selecting its book collection, while Anna was more involved with the clinic.

Anna Ottendorfer died in April 1884 before either project was completed, but in her will, she gave the German Hospital $10,000. On May 12, 1884, Oswald Ottendorfer wrote a letter to the NYFCL's trustees detailing the proposed gift to the library. The gift included $10,000 in 7% railroad bonds and furnishings for the branch, which was to include a reading room. An accompanying condition was that the reading material in German be maintained sufficiently, and German-speaking staff be in attendance. The NYFCL's trustees accepted the gift and its terms on May 16, 1884. By mid-1884, the NYFCL had control of the library. (Note: The National Park Service and New York City Landmarks Preservation Commission state that the Ottendorfers gave the under-construction library building to the NYFCL on January 10, 1884. However, a contemporary magazine states that the NYFCL took title to the library on June 10.)

The Stuyvesant Clinic was completed first, on May 25, 1884. The clinic's opening served partially a memorial for Anna Ottendorfer, its main benefactor. The Ottendorfer Library opened on December 7, 1884; the library's opening ceremony attended by visitors such as British peer Henry Edward Pellew and city planner Andrew Haswell Green. It became the second branch of the NYFCL, after the Bond Street Library.

=== Late 19th and early 20th centuries ===
==== Library ====
When the Ottendorfer Library opened, it had a collection of 8,819 volumes of which 4,035 were in German and 4,784 were in English. There was space for 15,000 volumes, a main reading room, and a smaller reference room. Patrons who were at least 12 years old could borrow a single book weekly "with references". At the time, the librarians felt that the poor population could not be trusted to take out books themselves, as in an open-shelf system. As such, the original stacks were closed to the public and only librarians could retrieve books. Nevertheless, the library circulated 95,316 volumes to 3,279 people in its first eleven months, and only lost four books in that time. The NYFCL's central bindery was installed in the Ottendorfer Library's basement in 1887.

Schickel designed an expansion to the library in 1897, which contained a series of iron stacks with thick glass floors, surrounding a central shaft. It used an open-shelf model, wherein patrons could retrieve the books themselves rather than ask librarians for help. A separate children's room was also established at the Ottendorfer branch, following the popularity of children's libraries at the NYFCL's 34th Street branch. After Oswald Ottendorfer died in 1900, he bequeathed $20,000 to the library and the hospital. In 1901, the eleven branches of the NYFCL system, including the Ottendorfer branch, became part of the NYPL. The next year, the library began circulating Russian language books. As other immigrant groups moved to the surrounding neighborhood, the library started circulating books in other languages, such as Czech/Slovak, Chinese, French, Italian, Polish, Spanish, and Ukrainian.

Few alterations were made to the library in subsequent years. A fire-proof vault was provided in the basement for preserving valuable documents and books of the library, and for the preservation of the records and papers of importance of interested German societies. The library and clinic shared water and steam-heating systems, and the library was already lit by gaslight.

==== Clinic ====
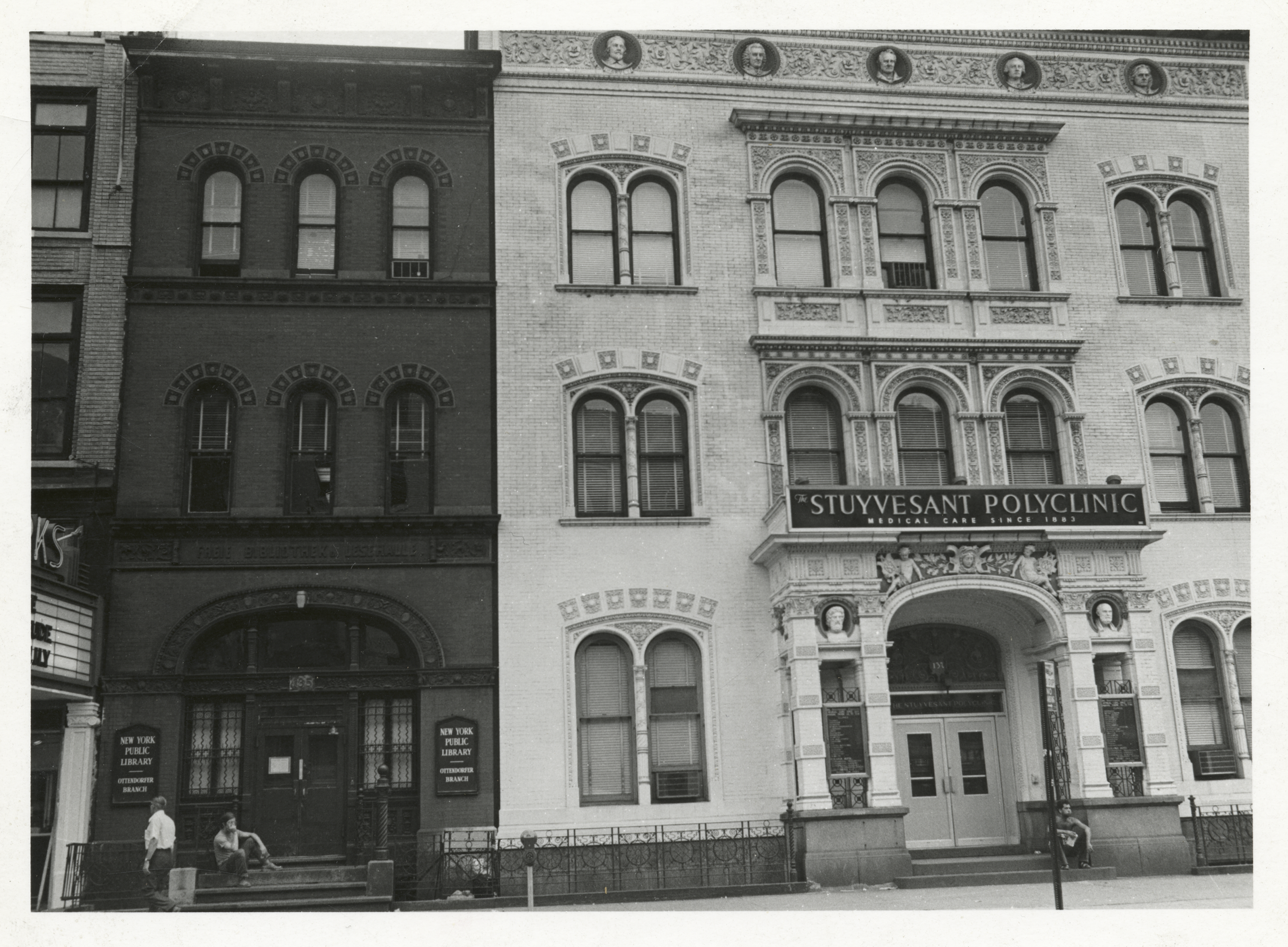
Library (left) and clinic (right) in 1968

In 1904, Werner & Windolph were hired to design a 2-story annex to the clinic on Seventh Street. A year later, the German Hospital began plans to build a dispensary uptown, which was closer to both the main hospital and to the Yorkville neighborhood's growing German population. It sold 137 Second Avenue in 1906 to another medical charity, the German Polyklinik. The hospital's name was changed to Stuyvesant Polyclinic following the anti-German sentiment connected with the entrance of the United States into World War I. The name was changed back to German Polyclinic in 1927, following campaigning from German-American groups.

The Ladies' Auxiliary Society of the German Polyclinic held a fundraising drive to replace the hospital building in 1929, with the goal of raising $3 million. The initiative was supported by mayor Jimmy Walker, but ultimately did not occur. The clinic opened its rheumatism department in 1938, and an auditorium was added to the German Polyclinic in 1941. The clinic was renamed the Stuyvesant Polyclinic again during World War II.

=== Mid-20th century to present ===
==== Mid- and late 20th century ====
The Stuyvesant Polyclinic continued to serve the East Village and Lower East Side, having served 6 million patients by 1954. The clinic's facade had been painted white by the 1960s. By then, the Ottendorfer Library was the oldest purpose-built library building in New York City that was still operating as a library. A New York Times article in 1964 reported that up to one-quarter of the 24,000-book collection was still in German.

Cabrini Medical Center took over the clinic in the 1970s, and the number of visits increased from 2,800 patients in 1978 to 34,000 in 1983. By then, it was serving a variety of ethnic groups in the East Village and Lower East Side. While the clinic was no longer free, it was low-cost, with patients paying $15 to $29 per visit depending on their income. When the New York City Landmarks Preservation Commission considered the clinic for city-landmark status in 1976, a community group called the Citizens Committee to Keep the Ottendorfer Library Open requested that the library also be considered for landmark status. The group perceived Cabrini's purchase of the clinic as a threat to the library, especially as the NYPL was facing financial problems at the time. The clinic became an official city landmark in 1976, followed by the library the next year. When a 3-month project to replace the library's 75-year-old coal furnace was announced in 1979, the Citizens Committee group staged a protest to prevent the furnace's replacement, even producing a restraining order from the New York Supreme Court. Ultimately, the library's interior received city landmark status in 1981. The interior of the clinic underwent a $200,000 renovation three years later.

The library was closed in October 1998 for a renovation that was slated to cost $2.1 million, which was funded by $1.6 million in city funding and a $0.5 million grant from Scherman Foundation. The renovation was conducted as part of the "Adopt-a-Branch" program, which had also renovated six other branches with a mixture of private and public funding. At the time of its closure, it was the busiest NYPL branch in Manhattan by circulation. Macrae-Gibson Architects devised a design that was evocative of the original appearance, while also adding other features such as new cables. The NYPL also considered expanding into the Stuyvesant Polyclinic because the fire escape in front of the library was deteriorated, but this proposal was dismissed as too expensive. At the time, Cabrini Medical Center owned both structures but rented out the library building to the NYPL for free. The renovation was finished by mid-2001.

==== 21st century ====
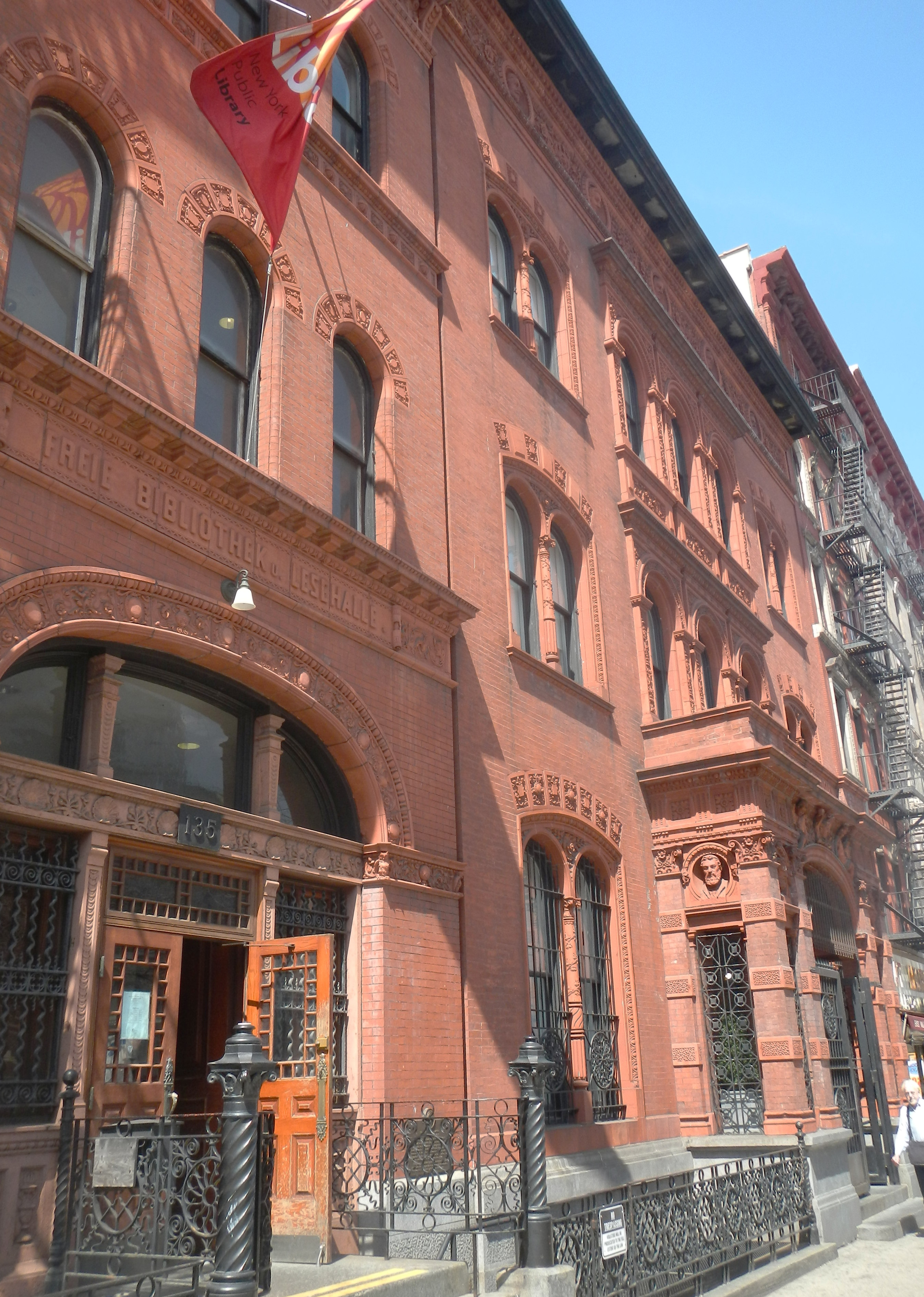
Seen from the sidewalk

By mid-2005, The Villager reported that the hospital building might be converted to condominiums. While the rumor was false, the clinic was already searching for a buyer for its building by then. The hospital building was ultimately sold for $7 million in July 2006, and the clinic moved out the following month. New plans for the clinic building were revealed in January 2007. The first floor would become condominium space, while the second and third floors would be turned into student dormitories, and three additional floors for dormitories would be built. This redevelopment proposal also did not occur, and the clinic building was sold again for $7 million in September 2007. By 2008, the clinic building was for sale yet again at a cost of $13 million, though it was marketed as a mansion. The hospital building was ultimately purchased by Lower East Side Equities who leased it to British consulting firm What If.

The buildings were restored in 2009 by David Mayerfied. As part of the project, Mayerfied removed paint from columns and railings, removed the dropped ceilings, and added a sprinkler system. Christopher Gray of The New York Times characterized the exterior as "neglected and forlorn", having not been renovated since the mid-20th century. The library celebrated its 125th anniversary upon the completion of the renovation in December 2009. At the time, only 30 books remained from the German collection.

The Ottendorfer branch was closed for another set of renovations between August 2018 and March 2019; the project included adding sprinkler and alarm systems. Additionally, in January 2019, the women's coworking firm The Wing signed a lease for the entirety of the Stuyvesant Polyclinic for its headquarters. The company spent $1.7 million on workspaces and a kitchen in the Polyclinic building. The Wing moved into the space in June 2019, and the Cofinance Group bought 137 Second Avenue for $18 million the same month. After the Wing shuttered, 137 Second Avenue was placed for sale in March 2023; it was sold for $19 million to an unidentified buyer that August.

== Architecture ==
The buildings, on the west side of Second Avenue near St. Marks Place, were designed as a pair by German-born architect William Schickel. They were designed in the neo-Italian Renaissance style, with Philadelphia pressed brick facades ornamented in terracotta, a relatively new building material to New York at the time of the buildings' construction. The terracotta was manufactured by the Perth Amboy Terra Cotta Company.

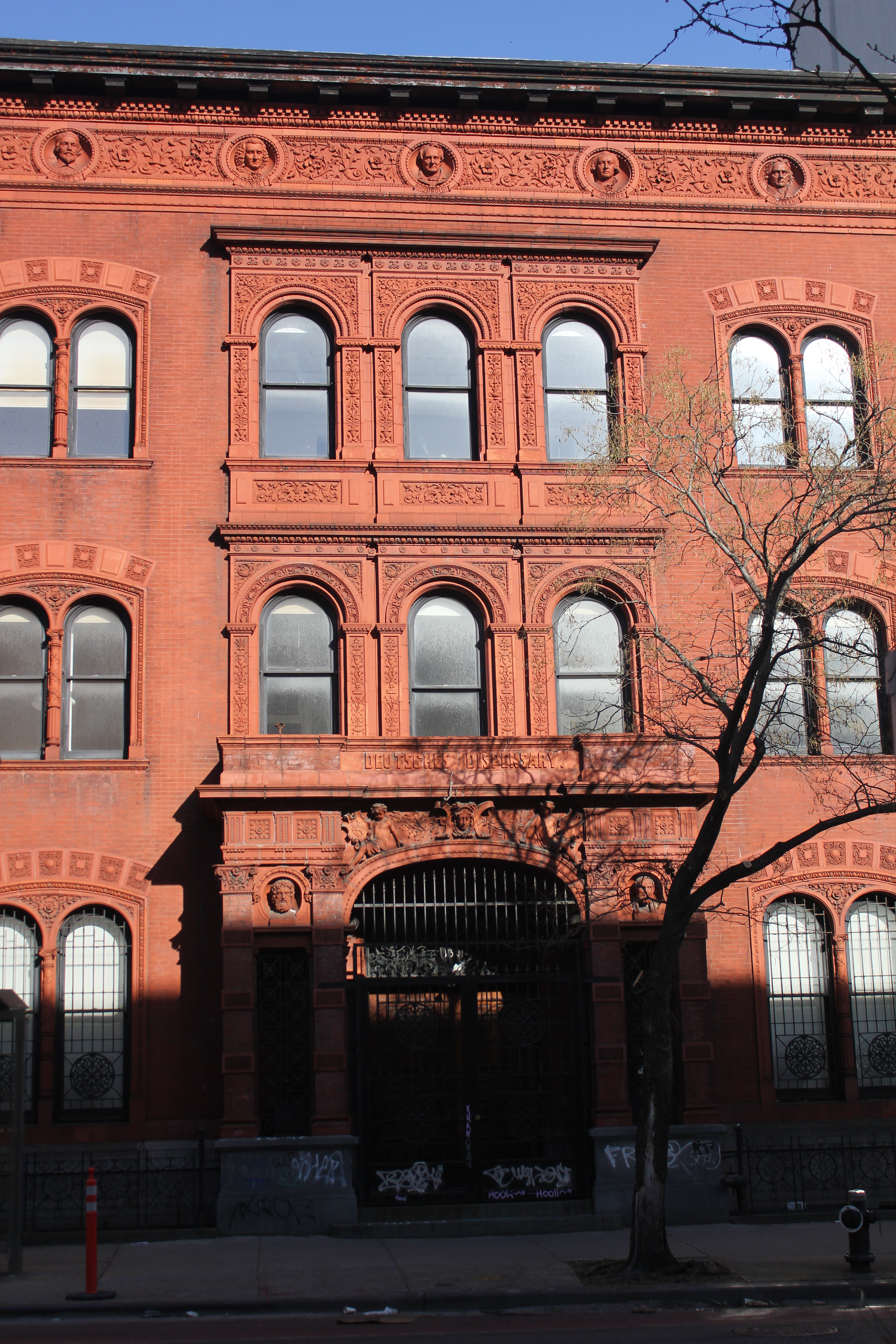
Clinic building seen in 2022

The library building at 135 Second Avenue has a frontage of 20 feet (6.1 m) along Second Avenue, while the former hospital at 137 Second Avenue has 50 feet (15 m) of frontage; both structures are 67.6 feet (20.6 m) deep. A laboratory was also attached to the hospital's rear. An annex to the library was built in subsequent years.

=== Clinic ===
The former hospital building's facade is subdivided into three vertical bays. The central bay has an entrance portico at the first floor, as well as three arched windows on the second and third floors, which are surrounded with terracotta ornamentation. The outer bays have pairs of arched windows on each floor, which are separated with decorated colonettes in the Corinthian style, with ornamented terracotta voussoirs above each window pairing.

The pediment of the portico is supported by two pairs of brick piers with vermiculated blocks, topped by Corinthian capitals. An entrance arch is inside the portico. Above the arch is a decorative composition with two inscribed dates: 1857 (representing the year the German Dispensary was founded) and 1883 (representing the year of the building's construction). The portico has four terracotta busts of classical physicians: Greek physician Hippocrates, Roman physician and author Aulus Cornelius Celsus, Greek god of medicine Asclepius, and Greek physician and philosopher Galen. Atop the building is a frieze that contains depictions of five scientists and physicians from the 17th through 19th centuries. These figures are English physician William Harvey, Swedish botanist Carl Linnaeus, German explorer and scientist Alexander von Humboldt, French physicist Antoine Lavoisier, and German physician and author Christoph Wilhelm Hufeland.

Inside the former hospital building is a foyer with walls made of marble below wood paneling. From there, double doors with glass paneling lead to a square main lobby. As originally arranged, there were offices and examination rooms on either side of the lobby. There was a wide staircase on the north wall with a decorative wooden handrail, which turned at right angles as it went to the second and third floors. The second and third floors also had offices and examination rooms. When The Wing moved into the space in 2019, the former offices and examination rooms were turned into communal coworking spaces. Ten rooms were turned into conference rooms named after women's educational institutions.

=== Library ===
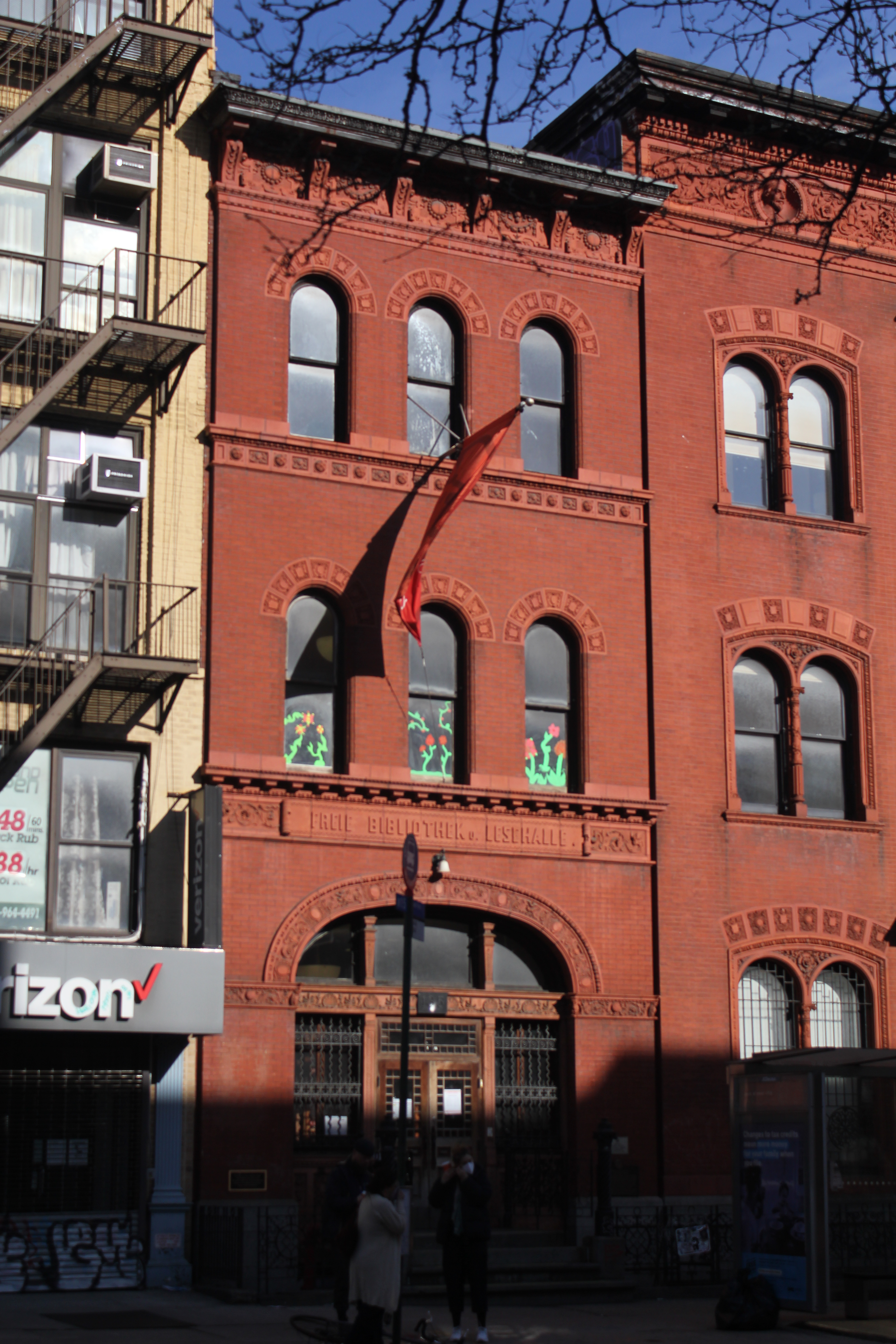
Library entrance seen in 2022

==== Exterior ====
The decorative details on the Ottendorfer Library are less elaborate compared to those on the clinic building. The main entrance is through an arched entrance with a small stoop, and contains a Queen Anne style double door under an iron-and-glass transom window. There are iron pilasters on either side of the door, as well as an ornately decorated transom bar above the doorway and transom window; decorated horizontal band courses with owl and globe symbols are located on either side of the transom bar. Surrounding the top of the archway is a set of terracotta egg-and-dart decorations. At the top of the first floor is the German inscription Freie Bibliothek und Lesehalle (Free Library and Reading Room) as well as an egg-and-dart molding.

The articulation of the library's upper floors is similar to that of the adjacent clinic building. The second and third floors both have three narrow arched windows that are 8 feet (2.4 m) tall. The voussoirs above the windows contain decorative terracotta cartouches. A frieze with hemispheres, cartouches, and an egg-and-dart molding runs above the second floor. Another frieze runs above the third floor, decorated with wreaths, garlands, bead-and-reel, and egg-and-dart motifs. Atop the third-story frieze is a large cornice supported by terracotta brackets.

==== Interior ====
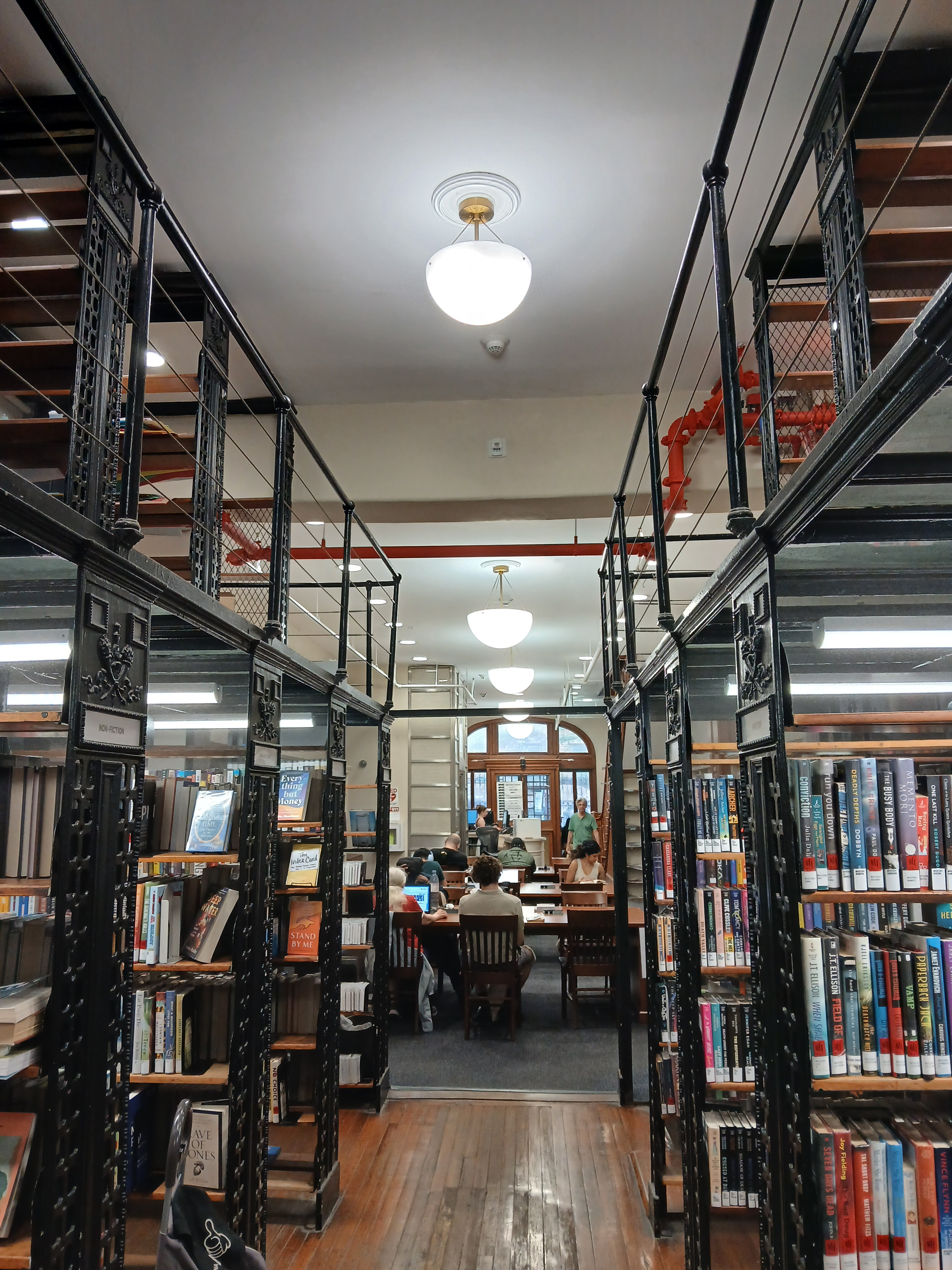
View from the stacks facing the entrance

Immediately inside the doorway is a circulation desk as well as a small reading room. The wall contains a vertically-ribbed wainscot wrapping around the south and north walls. The south wall contains a dumbwaiter shaft as well as bookshelves. In the rear of the library are double-height iron stacks with openwork gratings, manufactured by Hopkins & Co. There are glass floor panels on the second level of the stacks, which form a mezzanine level and contain iron railings. Behind the stacks is a workspace with shelves and cupboards. There are eight sections of stacks on the lower level and nine sections on the upper mezzanine.

The south wall contains a staircase leading to the second floor. The staircase has a railing made of dark wood, with alternating twisting and rectangular balusters. The second floor is a narrow room that served as the main reading room. As arranged, the second floor contained a children's room in the front (facing Second Avenue), a reading area in the center, and a women's reading room in the back. The window openings on each wall contain elaborate surrounds. A Lincrusta Walton wall covering was used in place of wood wainscoting, and a wide molding is at the top of the walls, with a coved ceiling above. The center section of the second floor contains a fireplace with a pink marble mantel, as well as bookshelves. The back section was separated from the front and center sections by a glass partition, and was raised above the rest of the second floor by two steps. A sign at the back section's entrance contained the words Zur lese Halle für Fräuen, translating to "to the women's reading room".

The Ottendorfer Library contained a librarian's residence on the third floor, one of 32 such residences in the New York Public Library (NYPL) system. The librarian's penthouse had wooden doors, stone fireplaces, and wall trimmings.

== Critical reception and landmark designations ==
One critic in the Real Estate Record and Guide called the buildings' compositions "entirely commonplace". The unnamed critic stated that the clinic's porch was "a very unschooled and uncouth piece of work" and that the library had an arch of the "ugly and fashionable three-centered form". The New York Times said in 1964 that, following the exodus of Little Germany and the East Village's subsequent redevelopment, the two buildings were "the last props of an era long gone", despite not having been designed for "architectural unity".

The Landmarks Preservation Commission designated the Stuyvesant Polyclinic's exterior a New York City landmark in 1976. The Ottendorfer Library's exterior was designated a New York City landmark in 1977, while its first- and second-floor interior was designated as a city landmark in 1981. Both buildings were jointly added to the National Register of Historic Places in 1979.

== See also ==
- List of New York City Designated Landmarks in Manhattan below 14th Street
- List of New York Public Library branches
- National Register of Historic Places listings in Manhattan below 14th Street
