= Oswald Ottendorfer =

German-American journalist

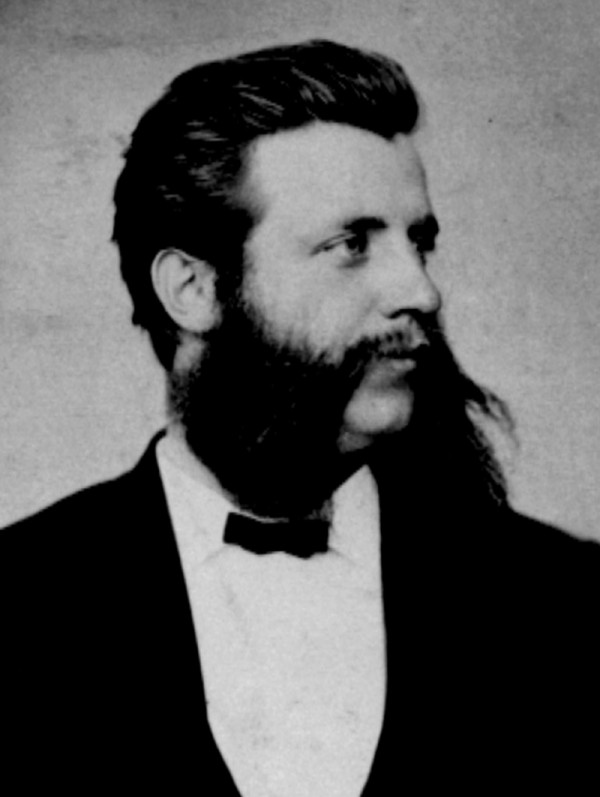

Member of the New York City Board of Aldermen
- In office January 1873 – April 1874

Member of the Board of Regents of the University of the State of New York
- In office April 14, 1870 – 1873

Personal details
- Born: February 26, 1826 Zwittau, Moravia
- Died: December 15, 1900 (aged 74) New York City, United States
- Education: University of Vienna; University of Prague
- Occupation: Journalist, editor
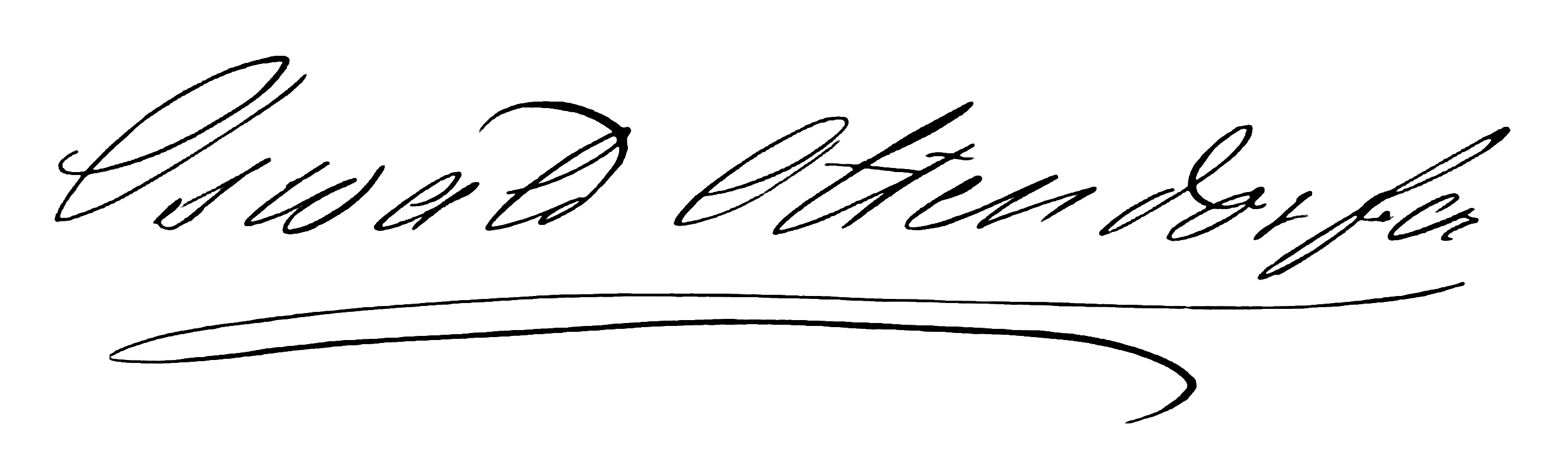
- Signature

Valentin Oswald Ottendorfer (26 February 1826 – 15 December 1900) was an American journalist associated with the development of the German-language New Yorker Staats-Zeitung into a major newspaper. He served a term as a member of the New York City Board of Aldermen and as a member of the Board of Regents of the University of the State of New York. He also served three times as an elector of the United States Electoral College. In addition to his political and journalistic pursuits, Ottendorfer was a notable philanthropist in both Europe and the United States. Today, he is best remembered as the donor whose contribution founded the Ottendorfer Public Library in Manhattan, which bears his name.

== Education ==
Ottendorfer was the son of a manufacturer, the youngest of six children. He was sent to live with a married sister in Brunn. There he studied the classics in the gymnasium. At the age of 20, he left to study jurisprudence at the University of Vienna, and then transferred to the University of Prague to learn the Czech language.

== Revolutionary ==
In 1848, he returned to Vienna, intending to finish his studies in Padua, which at that time was in the possession of Austria. However, the upheavals at that time enlisted his sympathies. Ottendorfer joined the Von der Tann volunteer corps, and briefly served in the first Schleswig-Holstein War. On returning to Vienna during the Vienna Rebellion, he found the revolutionaries in control of the government, and joined the mobile guard as a 1st lieutenant. During the storming of the city by government forces in October, he was in the battalion that was commanded by Robert Blum.

Many of his fellow revolutionaries were captured or killed. He managed to escape. He was concealed by a friendly porter in a bookstore until the excitement subsided, and then fled to the Bohemian frontier, and from there to Saxony. He subsequently became involved in the 1849 uprisings in Saxony and Baden, after the failure of which, he fled to Switzerland. He briefly considered giving himself up to the government in Vienna, but was informed that would cost him his life, and so went to the United States.

== Journalism ==
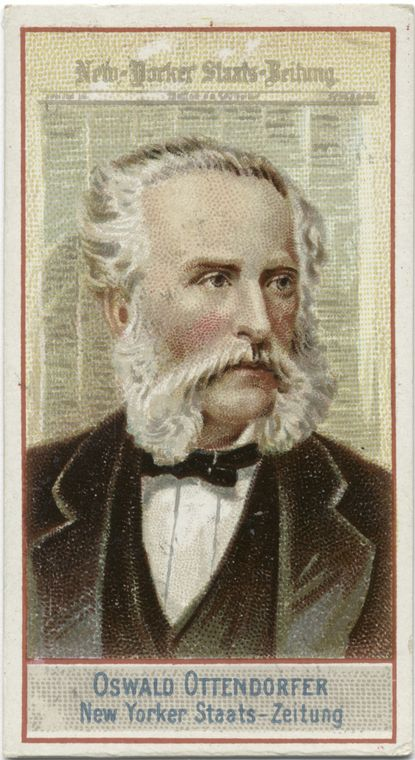
Ottendorfer on a cigarette card

On his arrival in New York City, he knew Latin, Greek, Hebrew and several Slavic languages, but no English, and for two or three months after his arrival, he was able to earn no more than a bare subsistence. Then he found employment in the counting room of the Staats-Zeitung. After the death of its proprietor, Jacob Uhl, in 1852, the management of the paper devolved to his widow, and the services of Ottendorfer became gradually more important. He became editor in 1858 and wed Jacob Uhl's widow, Anna Uhl, in 1859.

The year of his marriage, he returned to Europe, but avoided Austria, though he was assured he would not be bothered there. In 1866, he did visit Austria.

He was editor and publisher of the Staats-Zeitung from 1859 to 1900; his wife was business manager until her death in 1884. As the German-born population of New York City increased, his journal, in which he endeavored to reflect the sentiments of German-Americans, became one of the most widely circulated and influential in New York.

== Politics ==
Ottendorfer adhered to the principles of the Democratic Party, but joined no political organization, and maintained an independent position. He was an advocate of civil service reform, and active in promoting improvements in the public school system. He supported Stephen Douglas in 1860; he was a "Union Democrat" opposed to Fernando Wood's "Peace Democrats" who were Confederate sympathizers. From 1872 to 1874 he was an alderman, and in 1874 a candidate for Mayor of New York City. Several times he was a presidential elector, including in 1868, 1876, and 1884.

== Philanthropy ==
Besides other charitable gifts, Ottendorfer gave $300,000 to build and endow an educational institution in his native town in Austria. On Long Island, New York, he founded a home for aged and indigent men, and established the Ottendorfer Free Library (now the Ottendorfer Branch of the New York Public Library system which it joined in the 1890s) on Second Avenue, New York City, at an original cost of $50,000, which was augmented by annual gifts. His wife, Anna Ottendorfer, was also a noted philanthropist.

== Later years ==
In later life, Ottendorfer retired from active journalism on account of failing health, and spent most of his time in Europe.

== See also ==
- 6-15-99 Club
