= San Felipe Stakes =

American Thoroughbred horse race

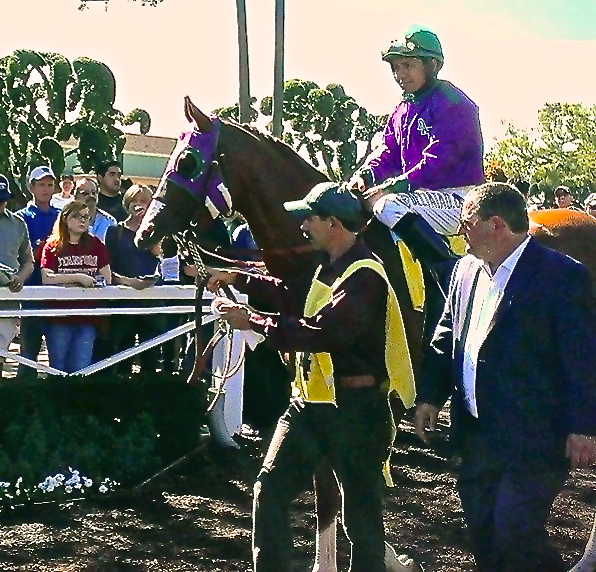
- Class: Grade II
- Location: Santa Anita Park; Arcadia, California, United States
- Inaugurated: 1935
- Race type: Thoroughbred – Flat racing
- Website: www.santaanita.com

Race information
- Distance: 1 1/16 miles (8 1/2 furlongs)
- Surface: Dirt
- Track: Left-handed
- Qualification: Three-year-olds
- Weight: 124 lbs. with allowances
- Purse: $400,000 (since 2015)

The San Felipe Stakes is an American Thoroughbred horse race run annually at Santa Anita Park in Arcadia, California. It is a Grade II event open to three-year-old horses. Normally held in early -March, it is raced at a distance of one and one-sixteenth miles (8 1/2 furlongs) on dirt and currently offers a purse of $400,000. It is listed as an official prep race on the Road to the Kentucky Derby.

== Race history ==
Inaugurated as the San Felipe Handicap in 1935, due to World War II there was no race run in 1942, 1943, and 1944. From 1935 through 1940 the race was open to colts and geldings, three years of age and older. Since 1941 it has been restricted to three-year-olds and in 1952 was made open to all three-year-olds irrespective of their sex. It was raced as a handicap event from 1935 through 1941 and again from 1952 through 1990.

As a prep for both the Santa Anita and Kentucky Derbies, the San Felipe has featured many of California's top three-year-olds over the years, including Derby winners California Chrome, Fusaichi Pegasus, Sunday Silence and Triple Crown winner Affirmed.

The 2019 San Felipe was cancelled due to Santa Anita's safety-related suspension of live racing.

Since inception, it has been competed over a variety of distances:

- 6 furlongs: 1938–1940, 1945–1946
- 7 furlongs: 1937, 1941, 1947–1951
- 1 mile: 1935–1936
- 1 1/16 miles: since 1952

The San Felipe Stakes was run in two divisions in 1968 and 1970.

== Race records ==
Speed record:

- 1:40.11 - Consolidator (2005) (at current distance of 1 1/16 miles)

Most wins by a jockey:

- 7 - Chris McCarron (1982, 1983, 1986, 1988, 1991, 1993, 1998)

Most wins by a trainer:

- 10 - Bob Baffert (1999, 2001, 2004, 2009, 2015, 2017, 2020, 2021, 2024, 2026)

Most wins by an owner:

- 2 - Fred W. Hooper (1949, 1982)
- 2 - Andrew J. Crevolin (1953, 1954)
- 2 - William Haggin Perry (1965, 1968)
- 2 - Burt Bacharach (1994, 1995)
- 2 - Starlight Racing (2020, 2024)
- 2 - SF Racing (2020, 2024)

== Winners ==
| Year | Winner | Jockey | Trainer | Owner | Time |
|---|---|---|---|---|---|
| 2026 | Potente | Juan J. Hernandez | Bob Baffert | Speedway Stables LLC | 1:42.92 |
| 2025 | Journalism | Umberto Rispoli | Michael W. McCarthy | Bridlewood Farm, Don Alberto Stable, Eclipse Thoroughbred Partners, Elayne Stables 5 LLC & Robert V. LePenta | 1:42.24 |
| 2024 | Imagination | Frankie Dettori | Bob Baffert | SF Racing LLC, Starlight Racing, Madaket Stables LLC, Stonestreet Stables LLC, Dianne Bashor, Robert E. Masterson, Waves Edge Capital LLC, Donovan, Catherine & Tom J. Ryan | 1:44.55 |
| 2023 | Practical Move | Ramon A. Vazquez | Tim Yakteen | Leslie A. Amestoy, Pierre Jean Amestoy, & Roger K. Beasley | 1:42.01 |
| 2022 | Forbidden Kingdom | Juan J. Hernandez | Richard Mandella | Spendthrift Farm & MyRacehorse | 1:43.96 |
| 2021 | Life Is Good | Mike E. Smith | Bob Baffert | WinStar Farm & China Horse Club | 1:42.18 |
| 2020 | Authentic | Drayden Van Dyke | Bob Baffert | SF Racing LLC, Starlight Racing | 1:43.56 |
| 2019 | no race | | | | |
| 2018 | Bolt d'Oro | Javier Castellano | Mick Ruis | Ruis Racing LLC | 1:42.71 |
| 2017 | Mastery | Mike E. Smith | Bob Baffert | Cheyenne Stables | 1:42.28 |
| 2016 | Danzing Candy | Mike E. Smith | Clifford W. Sise Jr. | Halo Farms/Bashor | 1:43.04 |
| 2015 | Dortmund | Martin Garcia | Bob Baffert | Kaleem Shah, Inc. | 1:41.65 |
| 2014 | California Chrome | Victor Espinoza | Art Sherman | Coburn/Martin | 1:40.59 |
| 2013 | Hear the Ghost | Corey Nakatani | Jerry Hollendorfer | Halo Farms/Hollendorfer | 1:42.34 |
| 2012 | Creative Cause | Joel Rosario | Michael Harrington | Heinz Steinmann | 1:41.84 |
| 2011 | Premier Pegasus | Alonso Quinonez | Myung Kwon Cho | Myung Kwon Cho | 1:41.23 |
| 2010 | Sidney's Candy | Joe Talamo | John W. Sadler | Sid & Jenny Craig Trust | 1:42.30 |
| 2009 | Pioneerof the Nile | Garrett Gomez | Bob Baffert | Zayat Stables | 1:43.35 |
| 2008 | Georgie Boy | Michael Baze | Kathy Walsh | George Schwary | 1:42.35 |
| 2007 | Cobalt Blue | Victor Espinoza | Doug O'Neill | Merv Griffin Ranch | 1:42.46 |
| 2006 | A. P. Warrior | Corey Nakatani | John Shirreffs | Stanley E. Fulton | 1:42.40 |
| 2005 | Consolidator | Rafael Bejarano | D. Wayne Lukas | Robert & Beverly Lewis | 1:40.11 |
| 2004 | Preachinatthebar | Javier Santiago | Bob Baffert | Michael E. Pegram | 1:42.87 |
| 2003 | Buddy Gil | Gary Stevens | Jeff Mullins | Desperado Stables et al. | 1:43.64 |
| 2002 | Medaglia d'Oro | Laffit Pincay Jr. | Robert J. Frankel | Edmund A. Gann | 1:41.95 |
| 2001 | Point Given | Gary Stevens | Bob Baffert | The Thoroughbred Corp. | 1:41.94 |
| 2000 | Fusaichi Pegasus | Kent Desormeaux | Neil D. Drysdale | Fusao Sekiguchi | 1:42.66 |
| 1999 | Prime Timber | David R. Flores | Bob Baffert | Aaron & Marie Jones | 1:42.16 |
| 1998 | Artax | Chris McCarron | Randy Bradshaw | Paraneck Stable | 1:41.73 |
| 1997 | Free House | David R. Flores | J. Paco Gonzalez | McCaffery & Toffan | 1:42.49 |
| 1996 | Odyle | Corey Nakatani | J. Paco Gonzalez | Trudy McCaffery & John Toffan | 1:42.43 |
| 1995 | Afternoon Deelites | Kent Desormeaux | Richard Mandella | Burt Bacharach | 1:42.11 |
| 1994 | Soul of the Matter | Kent Desormeaux | Richard Mandella | Burt Bacharach | 1:44.68 |
| 1993 | Corby | Chris McCarron | John W. Sadler | Allen E. Paulson | 1:42.11 |
| 1992 | Bertrando | Alex Solis | Bruce Headley | Headley/Nahem/505 Farms | 1:42.76 |
| 1991 | Sea Cadet | Chris McCarron | Ron McAnally | VHW Stables (Lessee) | 1:41.80 |
| 1990 | Real Cash | Alex Solis | D. Wayne Lukas | Lukas & Overbrook Farm | 1:42.00 |
| 1989 | Sunday Silence | Pat Valenzuela | Charlie Whittingham | H-G-W Partners | 1:42.60 |
| 1988 | Mi Preferido | Chris McCarron | Laz S. Barrera | Barrera & Saiden | 1:42.20 |
| 1987 | Chart the Stars | Ed Delahoussaye | Richard Mulhall | Arnold, Clearman et al. | 1:43.00 |
| 1986 | Variety Road | Chris McCarron | Bruce Headley | Kjell Qvale | 1:45.40 |
| 1985 | Image of Greatness | Laffit Pincay Jr. | D. Wayne Lukas | Kinsman Stable | 1:43.20 |
| 1984 | Fali Time | Sandy Hawley | Gary F. Jones | Mamakos & Stubrin | 1:42.60 |
| 1983 | Desert Wine | Chris McCarron | Jerry M. Fanning | Cardiff Stud/T90 Ranch | 1:41.60 |
| 1982 | Advance Man | Chris McCarron | Ross Fenstermaker | Fred W. Hooper | 1:42.20 |
| 1981 | Stancharry | Fernando Toro | Melvin F. Stute | Cole, Freeman & Gold | 1:42.00 |
| 1980 | Raise a Man | Bill Shoemaker | Chay R. Knight | Northwest Farms | 1:41.60 |
| 1979 | Pole Position | Sandy Hawley | George E. Goodwin | Eldorado Stables | 1:41.20 |
| 1978 | Affirmed | Steve Cauthen | Laz Barrera | Harbor View Farm | 1:42.60 |
| 1977 | Smasher | Sandy Hawley | Jay M. Robbins | Robbins & Rogers | 1:42.60 |
| 1976 | Crystal Water | Bill Shoemaker | Roger Clapp | Connie M. Ring | 1:42.60 |
| 1975 | Fleet Velvet | Fernando Toro | Tom Pratt | Leone J. Peters | 1:42.40 |
| 1974 | Aloha Mood | Don Pierce | Cecil Jolly | Joan Winchell | 1:42.40 |
| 1973 | Linda's Chief | Braulio Baeza | Robert J. Frankel | Neil Hellman | 1:41.80 |
| 1972 | Solar Salute | Laffit Pincay Jr. | Lou Glauburg | M/M John J. Elmore | 1:41.80 |
| 1971 | Unconscious | Laffit Pincay Jr. | John G. Canty | Arthur A. Seeligson Jr. | 1:42.60 |
| 1970 | Cool Hand | Jerry Lambert | Gene Cleveland | M/M John C. Mabee | 1:41.80 |
| 1970 | Terlago | Bill Shoemaker | Jerry M. Fanning | Samuel J. Agnew | 1:41.80 |
| 1969 | Elect the Ruler | Eddie Belmonte | Steve Ippolito | Mrs. Gerry Dreier | 1:44.20 |
| 1968 | Prince Pablo | Johnny Sellers | Linwood J. Brooks | Kratz-Thayer | 1:42.40 |
| 1968 | Dewan | Jerry Lambert | James W. Maloney | William H. Perry | 1:42.40 |
| 1967 | Rising Market | Laffit Pincay Jr. | Ted Saladin | M/M Bert W. Martin | 1:42.80 |
| 1966 | Saber Mountain | Bill Shoemaker | Charlie Whittingham | Howard B. Keck | 1:42.40 |
| 1965 | Jacinto | Manuel Ycaza | James W. Maloney | William H. Perry | 1:41.80 |
| 1964 | Hill Rise | Don Pierce | William B. Finnegan | El Peco Ranch | 1:41.40 |
| 1963 | Denodado | Rudy Campas | Charlie Whittingham | Flying M Stable | 1:45.00 |
| 1962 | Doc Jocoy | William Harmatz | L. C. Sternberger | M/M L. C. Sternberger | 1:44.20 |
| 1961 | Flutterby | Johnny Longden | Vance Longden | Alberta Ranches, Ltd. | 1:42.20 |
| 1960 | Flow Line | William Boland | Willie H. Wyndle | C. M. Crawford Jr. | 1:42.40 |
| 1959 | Finnegan | William Harmatz | William B. Finnegan | Neil S. McCarthy | 1:43.40 |
| 1958 | Carrier X | George Taniguchi | Robert L. Wheeler | Mrs. John L. McMahon | 1:45.60 |
| 1957 | Joe Price | Gordon Glisson | William Molter | M/M. Geo. Lewis Stable | 1:43.40 |
| 1956 | Social Climber | Larry Gilligan | Charlie Whittingham | Llangollen Farm | 1:44.40 |
| 1955 | Jean's Joe | William Boland | William B. Finnegan | Murcain Stable | 1:43.00 |
| 1954 | Determine | Raymond York | William Molter | Andrew J. Crevolin | 1:42.40 |
| 1953 | Decorated | Johnny Longden | William Molter | Andrew J. Crevolin | 1:44.20 |
| 1952 | Windy City II | Eddie Arcaro | Willie Alvarado | Petite Luellwitz | 1:44.00 |
| 1951 | Phil D. | Raymond York | James Jordan | W. C. Martin | 1:22.80 |
| 1950 | Your Host | Johnny Longden | Harry L. Daniels | William Goetz | 1:23.40 |
| 1949 | Olympia | Willie Garner | Ivan H. Parke | Fred W. Hooper | 1:22.80 |
| 1948 | May Reward | Eddie Arcaro | Elwood L. Fitzgerald | Norman W. Church | 1:23.60 |
| 1947 | Owners Choice | Johnny Longden | T. D. Grimes | Fannie Hertz | 1:23.60 |
| 1946 | Galla Damion | Ralph Neves | F. Veysey | C. J. Sebastian | 1:10.20 |
| 1945 | Sir Bim | Johnny Longden | Hurst Philpot | Don Ameche | 1:11.80 |
| 1941 | Bull Reigh | Basil James | Patrick F. Dwyer | Anthony Pelleteri | 1:24.00 |
| 1940 | Our Mat | Ralph Neves | Matthew P. Brady | William Ziegler Jr. | 1:10.40 |
| 1939 | Specify | John H. Adams | Albert A. Baroni | Albert A. Baroni | 1:10.20 |
| 1938 | Speed to Spare | Raymond Workman | O. Anderson | Circle M Ranch | 1:12.40 |
| 1937 | Boxthorn | George Woolf | Graceton Philpot | E. & W. Janss | 1:23.60 |
| 1936 | Azucar | Alfred Robertson | Alexis G. Wilson | F. M. Alger Jr. | 1:36.00 |
| 1935 | Ted Clark | Clyde Turk | C. A. Marone | C. N. Mooney | 1:37.60 |

* In 1983, Naevus was disqualified from first to second.

== See also ==
- Road to the Kentucky Derby
