= San Francisco Mile Stakes =

Horse race in California, U.S.

- Class: Grade III
- Location: Golden Gate Fields; Berkeley, California, United States
- Inaugurated: 1948 (as Golden Gate Mile)
- Race type: Thoroughbred – Flat racing
- Website: www.goldengatefields.com

Race information
- Distance: 1 mile (8 furlongs)
- Surface: Turf
- Track: Left-handed
- Qualification: Three-year-olds and older
- Weight: 125 lbs – older 120 lbs – three-year-olds
- Purse: US$175,000 (2024)

The San Francisco Mile Stakes is a Grade III American Thoroughbred horse race for horses age three and older over a distance of one mile (8 furlongs) on the turf held annually in April at Golden Gate Fields in Berkeley, California.

== History ==
The race was inaugurated on 2 October 1948 as the Golden Gate Mile and held on the dirt track. The event was won by Prevaricator who was entered as an entry with the 1948 American Champion Older Dirt Male Horse Shannon II in equal world record time of 1:34 2/5 equaling Equipoise record from 1932.

Two years later in 1950, Triple Crown champion Citation confirmed his greatness with a world record performance in winning the event by 3/4 of a length over Bolero in 1:33 3/5 breaking stablemate Coaltown's world record from the previous year. The 1955 event was won by the 1954 Kentucky Derby winner Determine, who won by a neck defeating Santa Anita Handicap winners Rejected and Irish bred Poona II who finished second in a dead heat. The brilliant Californian horse Native Diver raced in the event four times winning it twice in 1963 and 1967 as an eight-year-old.

In 1956, the event was renamed to the San Francisco Mile Handicap

The event was run on the turf in 1953 but was not regularly scheduled again until 1972.

The event was classified as a Grade III in 1987 and a Grade II between 1994–2010.

The only mare to win this event was the French-bred mare Tuzla in 1999.

Between 2001 and 2005 the event was held at Bay Meadows Racetrack. Since the 2006 the event has been run as San Francisco Mile Stakes. Between 1999 and 2006 the event had additional Breeders' Cup incentives.

The event has been split into divisions four times - 1964, 1966, 1972, 1984.

== Records ==
Speed record:

- 1 mile (turf) – 1:33.40 Don Alberto (1980)
- 1 mile (dirt) – 1:33.60 Citation (1950)

Margin

- 6 lengths Gamin (ARG) (1966)

Most wins

- 2 – Battle Ground (1957, 1958)
- 2 – Native Diver (1963, 1967)
- 2 – Alert Bay (2016, 2017)

Most wins by a jockey:

- 3 – Ralph Neves (1952, 1956, 1964)
- 3 – Bill Shoemaker (1953, 1960, 1963)

Most wins by a trainer:

- 5 – Julio C. Canani (1989, 1990, 1999, 2000, 2006)

== Winners ==
Year	Winner	Age	Jockey	Trainer	Owner	Distance	Time	Purse	Grade	Ref
At Golden Gate Fields – San Francisco Mile Stakes
2024	Lammas (GB)	7	Irving Orozco	Manuel Badilla	Ronald L. Charles & Samuel Gordon	1 mile	1:34.30	$177,700	III	
2023	Balnikhov (IRE)	5	Umberto Rispoli	Philip D'Amato	Little Red Feather Racing, Madaket Stables & Old Bones Racing Stable	1 mile	1:36.21	$251,800	III	
2022	Evening Sun (GB)	5	Brice Blanc	Jeff Mullins	Red Baron's Barn & Rancho Temescal	1 mile	1:35.36	$254,050	III	
2021	Whisper Not (GB)	4	Geovanni Geovanni	Richard Baltas	Electric City Racing, Madaket Stables, Christopher T. Dunn & Jeremy Peskoff	1 mile	1:35.94	$251,350	III	
2020	Neptune's Storm	4	William Antongeorgi III	Richard Baltas	CYBT, Saul Gevertz, Lynn Gitomer, Mike Goetz, Michael Nentwig, Daniel Weiner	1 mile	1:35.50	$251,350	III	
2019	Blitzkrieg	4	Rafael Bejarano	Doug F. O'Neill	R3 Racing, Calara Farms & Steve Rothblum	1 mile	1:35.56	$251,500	III	
2018	Flamboyant (FR)	7	Julien Couton	Patrick Gallagher	David Bienstock & Charles Winner	1 mile	1:36.15	$201,575	III	
2017	Alert Bay	6	Juan J. Hernandez	Blaine D. Wright	Peter Redekop	1 mile	1:35.12	$100,225	III	
2016	Alert Bay	5	Tyler Baze	Blaine D. Wright	Peter Redekop	1 mile	1:36.39	$101,800	III	
2015	G. G. Ryder	4	Ricardo Gonzalez	Jerry Hollendorfer	Jerry Hollendorfer & George Todaro	1 mile	1:37.87	$100,315	III	
2014	Pepper Crown	4	Abel Cedillo	Alex Paszkeicz	Alexander A. Paszkeicz Living Trust	1 mile	1:36.90	$100,315	III	
2013	Tigah (GB)	5	Alonso Quinonez	John W. Sadler	Karnel Jawl	1 mile	1:36.64	$100,000	III	
2012	Hudson Landing	5	Juan J. Hernandez	Blaine D. Wright	Chappell Alpine Farms	1 mile	1:37.29	$150,000	III	
2011	Our Nautique (NZ)	6	Kevin Krigger	Jerry Hollendorfer	Jerry Hollendorfer & Rob Tunnicliffe	1 mile	1:35.70	$100,000	III	
2010	Bold Chieftain	7	Russell Baze	William J. Morey Jr.	Dwaine Hall, Langbein Trust, W. J. Morey Jr., Trust UTA et al.	1 mile	1:35.21	$150,000	II	
2009	Mr Napper Tandy (GB)	5	Julio A. Garcia	Jack Carava	La Canada Stables	1 mile	1:36.07	$300,000	II	
2008	Race not held									
2007	Chinese Dragon	5	Mike E. Smith	Robert B. Hess Jr.	Michael Carter, Richard T. Hale Jr., Roncelli Family Trust, et al.	1 mile	1:35.81	$300,000	II	
2006	Charmo (FR)	5	Martin A. Pedroza	Julio C. Canani	David S. Milch	1 mile	1:34.28	$330,000	II	
At Bay Meadows – San Francisco Mile Handicap
2005	Castledale (IRE)	4	René R. Douglas	Jeff Mullins	Frank Lyons & Greg Knee	1 mile	1:37.40	$111,250	II	
2004	Singletary	4	Jose Valdivia Jr.	Don Chatlos	Little Red Feather Racing	1 mile	1:35.16	$148,750	II	
2003	Ninebanks	5	Ronald J. Warren Jr.	Jerry Hollendorfer	Peter Abruzzo	1 mile	1:37.20	$177,500	II	
2002	Suances (GB)	5	David R. Flores	Darrell Vienna	Jed Cohen	1 mile	1:35.19	$216,250	II	
2001	Redattore (BRZ)	6	Jason P. Lumpkins	Richard E. Mandella	Luis Alfredo Taunay	1 mile	1:35.14	$263,750	II	
At Golden Gate Fields
2000	Ladies Din	5	Kent J. Desormeaux	Julio C. Canani	J. Terrance Lanni & Bernard C. Schiappa	1 mile	1:35.04	$270,000	II	
1999	† Tuzla (FR)	5	Brice Blanc	Julio C. Canani	David S. Milch	1 mile	1:35.46	$294,000	II	
1998	Hawksley Hill (IRE)	5	Gary L. Stevens	Neil D. Drysdale	David & Jill Heerensperger	1 mile	1:34.20	$200,000	II	
1997	Wavy Run (IRE)	6	Brice Blanc	Darrell Vienna	Red Baron's Barn, No Problem Stable, Cohen et al.	1 mile	1:37.11	$200,000	II	
1996	Gold and Steel (FR)	4	Alex O. Solis	Ben D. A. Cecil	Gary A. Tanaka	1 mile	1:35.07	$200,000	II	
1995	Unfinished Symph	4	Chris Antley	Wesley A. Ward	Nancy Rice, Terry Hatcher & Joe Johnston	1 mile	1:34.14	$200,000	II	
1994	Gothland (FR)	5	Corey Nakatani	Wallace Dollase	Horizon Stable, Kadin & Webber	1 mile	1:35.46	$200,000	II	
1993	Norwich (GB)	6	Kent J. Desormeaux	Gary F. Jones	Darley Stud	1 mile	1:35.57	$250,000	III	
1992	Tight Spot	5	Laffit Pincay Jr.	Ron McAnally	Verne Winchell, Anderson, Whitham et al.	1 mile	1:35.57	$200,000	III	
1991	Forty Niner Days	4	Timothy T. Doocy	Roger M. Stein	Sidney Field	1 mile	1:38.80	$200,000	III	
1990	Colway Rally (GB)	6	Corey Black	Julio C. Canani	Clover Racing Stable, Alexander, Brittan et al.	1 mile	1:35.80	$200,000	III	
1989	Patchy Groundfog	6	Frank Olivares	Julio C. Canani	David Sofre	1 mile	1:38.20	$150,000	III	
1988	Ifrad	6	Thomas M. Chapman	Charles E. Whittingham	Sidney L. Port & Charles E. Whittingham	1 mile	1:36.40	$150,000	III	
1987	Dormello (ARG)	4	Antonio L. Diaz	Ron McAnally	Allen E. Paulson	1 mile	1:36.20	$150,000	III	
1986	Hail Bold King	5	Marco Castaneda	Charles E. Whittingham	Due Process Stable	1 mile	1:36.40	$117,200	Listed	
1985	Truce Maker	7	Julio A. Garcia	Michael C. Whittingham	Greer Garson & Buddy Fogelson	1 mile	1:35.20	$114,500	Listed	
1984	Drumalis (IRE)	4	Eddie Delahoussaye	Darrell Vienna	W. Gumpert, Duggan & Kennedy	1 mile	1:35.60	$65,775	Listed	Division 1
1984	§ Icehot	4	Marco Castaneda	Ron McAnally	Allen E. Paulson	1 mile	1:35.40	$56,755	Listed	Division 2
1983	King's County (IRE)	4	Enrique Munoz	John Sullivan	Ralph Williams	1 mile	1:37.60	$80,450	Listed	
1982	Silveyville	4	Debbie Winick	Emmett L. Campbell	Kjell Qvale	1 mile	1:36.80	$84,800	Listed	
1981	Opus Dei (FR)	6	Frank Olivares	Richard E. Mandella	Hastings Harcourt & Murty Farm	1 mile	1:34.80	$68,850		
1980	Don Alberto	5	Roberto M. Gonzalez	Doug Utley	Grinzewitsch & Lera	1 mile	1:33.40	$55,800		
1979	Struttin' George	5	Thomas M. Chapman	C. B. Hixon	Almaden Ranch	1 mile	1:37.40	$55,450		
1978	Jumping Hill	6	Jerry Lambert	John H. Adams	El Peco Ranch (George A. Pope Jr.)	1 mile	1:38.40	$55,000		Off turf
1977	Crafty Native	4	M. James	Richard M. Fuller	Robert L. Mead	1 mile	1:38.40	$40,000		Off turf
1976	Race not held									
1975	Whoa Boy	4	Gary Baze	Kathy Walsh	Pasky Dedominico	1 mile	1:39.00	$31,600		
1974	Visualizer	4	Francisco Mena	Jack Phillips	Fred W. Hooper	1 mile	1:38.00	$35,900		
1973	New Prospect	4	Johnny Sellers	Farrell W. Jones	Farrell W. Jones, Albert Sultan et al.	1 mile	1:43.20	$36,150		Off turf
1972	Imaginative	6	William Mahorney	Earl Bryant	Mr. & Mrs. Brian Johnston	1 mile	1:36.40	$21,850		Division 1
1972	Panzer Chief (NZ)	5	Victor Tejada	Wayne B. Stucki	J. Kel Housells Sr.	1 mile	1:36.20	$21,725		Division 2
1971	Figonero (ARG)	6	Álvaro Pineda	Warren R. Stute	Clement L. Hirsch	1 mile	1:34.60	$25,000		
1970	Field Master	6	Mario Valenzuela	J. Batties	J. Harold Seley	1 mile	1:37.80	$27,950		
1969	Wingover	6	Raul Cespedes	Hurst Philpot	Helen L. Kenaston	1 mile	1:37.80	$27,200		
1968	Bi G.	6	Ricardo Peniche	Wayne Branch	Reginald Dillabogh	1 mile	1:37.00	$27,300		
1967	Native Diver	8	Jerry Lambert	Buster Millerick	Mr. & Mrs Louis K. Shapiro	1 mile	1:35.20	$16,250		
1966	Lush Life	6	Estiban Medina	Cecil Jolly	Double HJ Stable	1 mile	1:34.20	$10,650		Division 1
1966	Gamin (ARG)	6	Álvaro Pineda	Warren R. Stute	Kerr Stable	1 mile	1:34.40	$10,450		Division 2
1965	Viking Spirit	5	Kenneth Church	James I. Nazworthy	Thomas E. Brittingham III Estate	1 mile	1:36.80	$15,875		
1964	Switchback	5	Ralph Neves	Charles A. Comiskey	Sky Blue Stables	1 mile	1:35.40	$12,500		Division 1
1964	Mustard Plaster	5	Dean Hall	William A. Peterson	Mr. & Mrs. Fraser Morrison	1 mile	1:34.80	$12,500		Division 2
1963	Native Diver	4	Bill Shoemaker	Buster Millerick	Mr. & Mrs Louis K. Shapiro	1 mile	1:35.20	$15,950		
1962	Chase Eddie	5	Johnny Longden	Roy J. Swenson	Mrs. Roy Swenson	1 mile	1:36:20	$10,750		
1961	Sea Orbit	4	Angel Valenzuela	Buster Millerick	Wonder Y Ranch	1 mile	1:36.60	$10,850		
1960	Race not held									
1959	The Searcher	5	Bill Shoemaker	Theodore B. Saladin	Mr. & Mrs. Bert W. Martin	1 mile	1:35.20	$16,350		
1958	Battle Dance	6	Henry Moreno	Joe Boyce	Frankie & W. Hughes	1 mile	1:37.40	$26,850		
1957	Battle Dance	5	Henry Moreno	Joe Boyce	Frankie & W. Hughes	1 mile	1:35.00	$16,025		
1956	Arrogate	4	Ralph Neves	Reggie Cornell	Mr. & Mrs. Richard Griegorian	1 mile	1:34.80	$26,750		
Golden Gate Mile
1955	§ Determine	4	Raymond York	William Molter	Andrew J. Crevolin	1 mile	1:38.00	$52,325		
1954	Golden Abbey	4	Jack Westrope	Reggie Cornell	William W. Naylor & Owl Stables	1 mile	1:35.00	$16,300		
1953	‡ Goose Khal	4	Bill Shoemaker	William F. Alvarado	Harry Brown	1 mile	1:36.40	$28,100		
1952	Lights Up	4	Ralph Neves	Hack Ross	Clifton H. Jones & Sons	1 mile	1:35.60	$29,450		
1951	Pension Plan	4	Ray York	George Mayberry	Connie M. Ring	1 mile	1:38:20	$11,425		
1950	Citation	5	Steve Brooks	Horace A. Jones	Calumet Farm	1 mile	1:33.60	$22,950		
1949	Dinner Gong	4	Jack Westrope	Frank E. Childs	Abe Hirschberg	1 mile	1:36.00	$17,940		
1948	§ Prevaricator	5	Johnny Longden	William Molter	Earl O. Stice & Sons	1 mile	1:34.40	$17,640		

Legend:
Turf Dirt
Notes:
§ Ran as part of an entry
† Filly or Mare
‡ Fleet Bird was disqualified and placed 3rd for interference. Goose Khan was promoted to first place.

== See also ==
- List of American and Canadian Graded races
