= 1954 Kentucky Derby =

Horse race

80th Kentucky Derby
- Kentucky Derby
- Grade I stakes race
- Location: Churchill Downs
- Date: May 1, 1954
- Winning horse: Determine
- Jockey: Raymond York
- Trainer: William Molter
- Owner: Andrew J. Crevolin
- Surface: Dirt

The 1954 Kentucky Derby was the 80th running of the Kentucky Derby. The race took place on May 1, 1954.

== Full results ==
Finished	Post	Horse	Jockey	Trainer	Owner	Time / behind
1st	2C	Determine	Raymond York	William Molter	Andrew J. Crevolin	
2nd	1	Hasty Road	Johnny Adams	Harry Trotsek	Hasty House Farm	
3rd	8	Hasseyampa	Arnold Kirkland	Howard Wells	Walmac Farm	
4th	4	Goyamo	Eddie Arcaro	Woody Stephens	Woodvale Farm	
5th	5	Admiral Porter	Paul J. Bailey	Eual Wyatt	Sunny Blue Farm	
6th	3	Correlation	Bill Shoemaker	Noble Threewitt	R. S. Lytle	
7th	11	Fisherman	Hedley Woodhouse	Sylvester Veitch	Cornelius Vanderbilt Whitney	
8th	6	James Session	Layton Risley	William Dennis	Harry James & Betty Grable James	
9th	2	Allied	Steve Brooks	William Molter	Andrew J. Crevolin	
10th	12	Gov. Browning	David Erb	Anthony W. Rupelt	Martin & McKinney	
11th	13	Super Devil	Robert L. Baird	William J. Resseguet Sr.	Rebel Stable	
12th	15	Red Hannigan	William Boland	Homer C. Pardue	Woodley Lane Farm	
13th	10	Black Metal	Anthony DeSpirito	Edward A. Neloy	Maine Chance Farm	
14th	1A	Sea O Erin	Conn McCreary	Harry Trotsek	Hasty House Farm	
15th	9	Timely Tip	Howard Craig	Reed Armstrong	A.L. Birch	
16th	7	King Phalanx	Douglas Dodson	Robert A. Mattingly	Sam E. Wilson Jr.	
17th	16	Mel Leavitt	Richard Mclaughlin	John B. Theall	Joe W. Brown	
