= Malibu Stakes =

- Class: Grade I
- Location: Santa Anita Park; Arcadia, California, United States
- Inaugurated: 1952
- Race type: Thoroughbred – Flat racing
- Website: www.santaanita.com

Race information
- Distance: 7 furlongs
- Surface: Dirt
- Track: left-handed
- Qualification: Three-year-olds
- Weight: Assigned
- Purse: $300,000

The Malibu Stakes is a race for three-year-old thoroughbred horses of either gender held each December at Santa Anita Park in Arcadia, California. The race is at a distance of seven furlongs and is the first leg of Santa Anita Park's Strub Series.

A Grade I event currently with a $300,000 purse, it has attracted some of America's best horses following the Breeders' Cup.

Inaugurated in 1952 as the Malibu Sequet Stakes, its name was changed to the present style in 1958.

There was a Malibu Stakes run in January and December of the same year in 1955, 1960, 1966, and 1984. It was run in two divisions in 1972, 1975, 1977, 1981, and 1984.

There was no race in 1959, 1964, 1967, 1970.

== Records ==
Speed record:

- 1:19.70 – Twirling Candy (2010)

Most wins by a jockey:

- 8 – Bill Shoemaker (1957, 1961, 1968, 1972, 1977 (2), 1980, 1986)

Most wins by a trainer:

- 7 – Bob Baffert (2011, 2013, 2018, 2020, 2022, 2023, 2025)

Most wins by an owner:

- 3 – Sol Kumin (2016 as Head of Plains Partners, 2020 and 2025 as Madaket Stables)

== Winners ==
Year	Winner	Jockey	Trainer	Owner	Time
2025	Goal Oriented	Joel Rosario	Bob Baffert	SF Racing, Starlight Racing, Madaket Stables, Stonestreet Stables, et al.	1:20.97
2024	Raging Torrent	Frankie Dettori	Doug O'Neill	Great Friends Stable and Mark Davis	1:21.54
2023	Speed Boat Beach	Flavien Prat	Bob Baffert	Michael E. Pegram, Karl Watson and Paul Weitman	1:21.70
2022	Taiba	Mike E. Smith	Bob Baffert	Zedan Racing Stables	1:21.75
2021	Flightline	Flavien Prat	John Sadler	Hronis Racing, Siena Farm, Summer Wind Equine, West Point Thoroughbreds and Woodford Racing	1:21.37
2020	Charlatan	Mike E. Smith	Bob Baffert	SF Racing LLC, Starlight Racing, Madaket Stables LLC, Stonestreet Stables LLC, et al.	1:21.50
2019	Omaha Beach	Mike E. Smith	Richard Mandella	Fox Hill Farms	1:22.33
2018	McKinzie	Mike E. Smith	Bob Baffert	Karl Watson, Mike Pegram, Paul Weitman	1:22.48
2017	City of Light	Drayden Van Dyke	Michael W. McCarthy	Mr. & Mrs. William K. Warren Jr.	1:21.21
2016	Mind Your Biscuits	Joel Rosario	Robert N. Falcone Jr.	J Stables, Head of Plains Partners, et al.	1:20.81
2015	Runhappy	Gary Stevens	Laura Wohlers	James McIngvale	1:21.76
2014	Shared Belief	Mike E. Smith	Jerry Hollendorfer	Jungle Racing/KMN Racing/Hollendorfer et al.	1:20.69
2013	Shakin It Up	David Flores	Bob Baffert	Cardoza/Pegram	1:20.53
2012	Jimmy Creed	Garrett Gomez	Richard Mandella	Spendthrift Farm	1:20.36
2011	The Factor	Martin Garcia	Bob Baffert	Fog City Stable/Bolton	1:19.89
2010	Twirling Candy	Joel Rosario	John W. Sadler	Craig Family Trust	1:19.70
2009	M One Rifle	Mike E. Smith	Bruce Headley	Bruce Headley & partners	1:21.05
2008	Bob Black Jack	David Flores	James Kasparoff	Jeff Harmon/Tim Kasparoff	1:20.20
2007	Johnny Eves	David Flores	Jay M. Robbins	Mooncoin LLC	1:21.08
2006	Latent Heat	Edgar Prado	Robert J. Frankel	Juddmonte Farms	1:21.39
2005	Proud Tower Too	David Cohen	Sal Gonzalez	Tricar Stables	1:21.62
2004	Rock Hard Ten	Gary Stevens	Richard Mandella	Mercedes Stable/M. Paulson	1:21.89
2003	Southern Image	Victor Espinoza	Mike Machowsky	Blahut Stables	1:22.65
2002	Debonair Joe	Julie Krone	Juan Silva	Lynne H. Ristad	1:22.40
2001	Mizzen Mast	Kent Desormeaux	Robert J. Frankel	Juddmonte Farms	1:22.13
2000	Dixie Union	Alex Solis	Richard Mandella	Diamond A Racing/H. Sarkowsky	1:21.62
1999	Love That Red	Garrett Gomez	Leonard Duncan	Terry D. Wells	1:22.06
1998	Run Man Run	Mike Luzzi	Anthony Margotta Jr.	Blasland/Brooks/Desadora	1:21.51
1997	Lord Grillo	Ed Delahoussaye	Mike Puype	Cobra Farm, Inc. (Lessee)	1:21.46
1996	King of the Heap	Kent Desormeaux	Wallace Dollase	Long/Nemet et al.	1:21.84
1995	Afternoon Deelites	Kent Desormeaux	Richard Mandella	Burt Bacharach	1:21.73
1994	Powis Castle	Pat Valenzuela	Rodney Rash	Vistas Stables	1:20.96
1993	Diazo	Laffit Pincay Jr.	Bill Shoemaker	Allen E. Paulson	1:21.00
1992	Star Of The Crop	Gary Stevens	Willard Proctor	Glen Hill Farm	1:20.67
1991	Olympio	Ed Delahoussaye	Ron McAnally	VHW Stables (Lessee)	1:21.28
1990	Pleasant Tap	Alex Solis	Chris Speckert	Buckland Farm	1:21.60
1989	Music Merci	Laffit Pincay Jr.	Craig C. Lewis	Pendleton/Royal T Stable	1:21.60
1988	Oraibi	Laffit Pincay Jr.	Richard Mandella	Ralph & Aury Todd	1:21.60
1987	On The Line	Ángel Cordero Jr.	D. Wayne Lukas	Eugene V. Klein	1:21.00
1986	Ferdinand	Bill Shoemaker	Charlie Whittingham	Howard B. Keck	1:21.60
1985	Banner Bob	Gary Baze	Charlie Whittingham	W. J. & Sharon E. Walsh	1:21.00
1984 (Note: Run in December 1984)	Precisionist	Chris McCarron	L. R. Fenstermaker	Fred W. Hooper	1:21.40
1984 (Note: Run in January 1984, second division)	Glacial Stream	Chris McCarron	Gordon C. Campbell	Est. of B. J. Ridder	1:22.20
1984 (Note: Run in January 1984, first division)	Pac Mania	Pat Valenzuela	Michael Whittingham	Oak Cliff Stable	1:22.60
1983	Time To Explode	Laffit Pincay Jr.	Gary F. Jones	M. G. Rutherford	1:21.00
1982	Island Whirl	Laffit Pincay Jr.	D. Wayne Lukas	Elcee-H Stable	1:26.00
1981	Doonesbury	Sandy Hawley	Barney Willis	Jones, Roffe et al.	1:20.40
1981	Raise a Man	Laffit Pincay Jr.	Chay R. Knight	Northwest Farms	1:20.40
1980	Spectacular Bid	Bill Shoemaker	Bud Delp	Hawksworth Farm	1:20.00
1979	Little Reb	Frank Olivares	Jerry M. Fanning	Fanning & Harrison	1:21.00
1978	J. O. Tobin	Steve Cauthen	Laz Barrera	El Peco Ranch	1:23.00
1977	Cojak	Bill Shoemaker	Hubert Hine	Entremont Farm	1:23.00
1977	Romantic Lead	Bill Shoemaker	Stephen A. DiMauro	Meadow Stable	1:22.40
1976	Forceten	Donald Pierce	Neil D. Drysdale	Saron Stable	1:21.20
1975	Lightning Mandate	Álvaro Pineda	Farrell W. Jones	Jones/McLeod/Mabee et al.	1:20.60
1975	Princely Native	Braulio Baeza	Laz Barrera	Harbor View Farm	1:20.80
1974	Ancient Title	Fernando Toro	Keith L. Stucki Sr.	Ethel Kirkland	1:22.80
1973	Bicker	Glenn Brogan	Robert Wingfield	Green Thumb Farm	1:21.40
1972	Wing Out	Bill Shoemaker	John Sullivan	Daybreak Farm	1:21.00
1972	Kfar Tov	Jerry Lambert	John W. Pappalardo	Billrick Stable	1:21.20
1971	King of Cricket	Danny Velasquez	Noble Threewitt	Corradini & Nuccio	1:21.20
1969	First Mate	Jerry Lambert	Buster Millerick	Albert Sultan	1:22.00
1968	Damascus	Bill Shoemaker	Frank Whiteley Jr.	Edith W. Bancroft	1:21.20
1966	Buckpasser	Braulio Baeza	Edward A. Neloy	Ogden Phipps	1:22.00
1966	Terry's Secret	Alex Maese	Carl A. Roles	Poltex Stable	1:23.00
1965	Power of Destiny	Kenneth Church	Hirsch Jacobs	Ethel D. Jacobs	1:22.00
1963	More Megaton	Raymond York	Jerry Wallace II	M/M E. B. Johnston	1:23.00
1962	Native Diver	Ralph Neves	Buster Millerick	M/M Louis K. Shapiro	1:21.60
1961	Olden Times	Bill Shoemaker	Mesh Tenney	Rex C. Ellsworth	1:22.00
1960	Tompion	Manuel Ycaza	Robert L. Wheeler	C. V. Whitney	1:21.40
1960	Ole Fols	William Boland	William B. Finnegan	Neil S. McCarthy	1:23.00
1958	Hillsdale	Tommy Barrow	Martin L. Fallon Jr.	Clarence Whitted Smith	1:22.40
1957	Round Table	Bill Shoemaker	William Molter	Kerr Stable	1:22.00
1956	Blen Host	Don Lewis	Bob R. Roberts	Gazelle Stable	1:23.00
1955	Honeys Alibi	William Boland	Dave Hurn	W-L Ranch Co.	1:23.00
1955	Determine	Raymond York	William Molter	Andrew J. Crevolin	1:22.60
1954	Imbros	Raymond York	William Molter	Andrew J. Crevolin	1:20.60
1953	A Gleam	Eddie Arcaro	Horace A. Jones	Calumet Farm	1:22.80
1952	Phil D	Raymond York	James Jordan	M/M W. C. Martin	1:23.00
