= Californian Stakes =

- Class: Grade II
- Location: Santa Anita Park; Arcadia, California, USA relocated after the closure of Hollywood Park Racetrack; Inglewood, California, United States
- Inaugurated: 1954
- Race type: Thoroughbred - Flat racing
- Website: www.santaanita.com

Race information
- Distance: 1 1/8 miles (9 furlongs)
- Surface: Dirt
- Track: left-handed
- Qualification: Three-years-old & up
- Weight: Assigned
- Purse: $250,000

The Californian Stakes is an American Thoroughbred horse race run annually in late April at Santa Anita Park in Arcadia, California (relocated from the now closed Hollywood Park Racetrack in Inglewood, California). The Grade II event is open to horses age three and up willing to race one and one-eighth miles (9 furlongs) on the dirt. This race serves as a key prep to the Hollywood Gold Cup.

Inaugurated in 1954, winner Imbros set a new track record of 1:41.00 which also equaled the then world record for a mile and sixteenth on dirt.

Since inception the race has been contested at three different distances:

- 1 1/16 miles (8.5 furlongs) : 1954–1979
- 1 1/8 miles (9 furlongs)1980-1984, 1987–present
- 1 mile (8 furlongs) : 1985–1986

== Records ==
Speed record: (at current distance of 1 1/8 miles )

- 1:47.06 - Heatseeker

Most wins:

- 2 - Cougar II (1971, 1972)
- 2 - Quack (1973, 1974)
- 2 - Ancient Title (1975, 1976)
- 2 - Clubhouse Ride (2013, 2014)

Most wins by a jockey:

- 5 - Bill Shoemaker (1957, 1971, 1972, 1980, 1983)
- 5 - Laffit Pincay, Jr. (1975, 1977, 1979, 1982, 1985)
- 5 - Chris McCarron (1986, 1988, 1989, 1998, 1999)

Most wins by a trainer:

- 11 - Charlie Whittingham (1956, 1957, 1971, 1972, 1973, 1974, 1982, 1983, 1985, 1987, 1990)

Most wins by an owner:

- 3 - Mary Jones Bradley (1971, 1972, 1985)

== Winners ==
Year	Winner	Age	Jockey	Trainer	Owner	Time
2024	Mr. Fisk	4	Kazushi Kimura	Bob Baffert	Sunny Brook Stables	1:49.41
2023	Defunded	5	Juan J. Hernandez	Bob Baffert	Karl Watson, Michael E. Pegram & Paul Weitman	1:48.07
2022	Stilleto Boy	4	Juan J. Hernandez	Ed Moger Jr	Steve Moger	1:48.07
2021	Royal Ship	4	Mike E. Smith	Richard E. Mandella	Fox Hill Farm & Siena Farm	1:48.47
2020						
2019						
2018	Dr. Dorr	5	Joe Talamo	Bob Baffert	Natalie J. Baffert	1:49.84
2017	Collected	4	Martin Garcia	Bob Baffert	Speedway Stable LLC	1:47.73
2016	Second Summer	4	Mario Gutierrez	Peter Eurton	Alesia/Ciaglia Racing/Ferrell/Slam Dunk Racing	1:48.29
2015	Catch a Flight (ARG)	5	Gary Stevens	Richard E. Mandella	Haras Santa Maria de Araras	1:47.73
2014	Clubhouse Ride	6	Joe Talamo	Craig Anthony Lewis	Six-S Racing/Petralia	1:48.74
2013	Clubhouse Ride	5	Garrett Gomez	Craig Anthony Lewis	Six-S Racing/Petralia	1:51.02
2012	Game On Dude	5	Chantal Sutherland	Bob Baffert	Diamond Pride, Lanni Family Trust, Mercedes Stable, Bernard Schiappa	1:48.01
2011	Twirling Candy	4	Joel Rosario	John W. Sadler	Craig Family Trust	1:50.00
2010	Rail Trip	5	Rafael Bejarano	Ron Ellis	Jay Em Ess Stable	1:48.49
2009	Informed	5	Tyler Baze	Douglas F. O'Neill	W.C. Racing, et al.	1:48.37
2008	Heatseeker	5	Rafael Bejarano	Jerry Hollendorfer	William de Burgh	1:47.06
2007	Buzzards Bay	5	Jose Valdivia Jr.	Ronald W. Ellis	Gary Broad	1:49.72
2006	Dixie Meister	4	David Flores	Julio C. Canani	Gary A. Tanaka	1:49.53
2005	Lava Man	4	Pat Valenzuela	Douglas F. O'Neill	STD racing & Jason Wood	1:47.83
2004	Even the Score	4	David Flores	Vladimir Cerin	Rosendo G. Parra	1:47.64
2003	Kudos	6	Alex Solis	Richard Mandella	Ann & Jerry Moss	1:47.91
2002	Milwaukee Brew	5	Kent Desormeaux	Robert J. Frankel	Stronach Stable	1:48.06
2001	Skimming	5	Garrett Gomez	Robert J. Frankel	Juddmonte Farms	1:48.12
2000	Big Ten	5	Alex Solis	Richard Mandella	Stud Old Dog Stable (Francisco Bertin et al.)	1:49.22
1999	Old Trieste	4	Chris McCarron	Mike Puype	Gary Biszantz	1:46.55
1998	Mud Route	5	Chris McCarron	Ron McAnally	Janis R. Whitham	1:48.15
1997	River Keen	5	Kent Desormeaux	Robert B. Hess Jr.	Hugo Reynolds	1:47.38
1996	Tinners Way	6	Eddie Delahoussaye	Robert J. Frankel	Prince Khalid Abdullah	1:46.60
1995	Concern	4	Mike E. Smith	Richard W. Small	Robert E. Meyerhoff	1:47.74
1994	The Wicked North	5	Kent Desormeaux	David Bernstein	Phil & Sophie Hersh Trust	1:46.68
1993	Latin American	5	Gary Stevens	Robert Marshall	Robert Marshall	1:46.92
1992	Another Review	4	Kent Desormeaux	Chris Speckert	Thomas Mellon Evans	1:48.11
1991	Roanoke	4	Eddie Delahoussaye	Neil D. Drysdale	Nedlaw Stable	1:48.30
1990	Sunday Silence	4	Pat Valenzuela	Charlie Whittingham	Hancock/Whittingham/Gaillard	1:48.00
1989	Sabona	7	Chris McCarron	Neil D. Drysdale	Sir Ernest Harrison & Audrey Reed	1:46.80
1988	Cutlass Reality	6	Chris McCarron	Craig A. Lewis	Howard Crash & Jim Hankoff	1:47.60
1987	Judge Angelucci	4	Gary Baze	Charlie Whittingham	Olin B. Gentry	1:48.20
1986	Precisionist	5	Chris McCarron	L. Ross Fenstermaker	Fred W. Hooper	1:33.60
1985	Greinton	4	Laffit Pincay Jr.	Charlie Whittingham	Mary Jones Bradley, C. Whittingham, Howell Wynne	1:32.60
1984	Desert Wine	4	Eddie Delahoussaye	Jerry M. Fanning	Dan J. Agnew & Fred Sahadi	1:47.60
1983	The Wonder	5	Bill Shoemaker	Charlie Whittingham	Alain du Breil	1:48.40
1982	Erins Isle	4	Laffit Pincay Jr.	Charlie Whittingham	Brian Sweeney	1:48.00
1981	Eleven Stitches	4	Sandy Hawley	Donn Luby	Morey & Claudia Mirkin	1:48.40
1980	Spectacular Bid	4	Bill Shoemaker	Bud Delp	Hawksworth Farm (Harry Meyerhoff)	1:45.80
1979	Affirmed	4	Laffit Pincay Jr.	Laz Barrera	Harbor View Farm	1:41.20
1978	J.O. Tobin	4	Steve Cauthen	Laz Barrera	George A. Pope Jr.	1:41.00
1977	Crystal Water	4	Laffit Pincay Jr.	Roger Clapp	Connie M. Ring	1:41.00
1976	Ancient Title	6	Sandy Hawley	Keith L. Stucki Sr.	Kirkland Stable (Ethel Kirkland)	1:41.20
1975	Ancient Title	5	Laffit Pincay Jr.	Keith L. Stucki Sr.	Kirkland Stable (Ethel Kirkland)	1:40.20
1974	Quack	5	Donald Pierce	Charlie Whittingham	Bwamazon Farm	1:40.20
1973	Quack	4	Donald Pierce	Charlie Whittingham	Bwamazon Farm	1:41.40
1972	Cougar II	6	Bill Shoemaker	Charlie Whittingham	Mary F. Jones	1:39.20
1971	Cougar II	5	Bill Shoemaker	Charlie Whittingham	Mary F. Jones	1:41.20
1970	Baffle	5	Jerry Lambert	Johnny Longden	Frank M. McMahon	1:40.20
1969	Nodouble	4	Eddie Belmonte	J. Bert Sonnier	Gene Goff	1:40.40
1968	Dr. Fager	4	Braulio Baeza	John A. Nerud	William L. McKnight	1:40.80
1967	Biggs	7	William Harmatz	Farrell W. Jones	E. F. Gould	1:41.60
1966	Travel Orb	4	William Harmatz	Leonard Dorfman	Floyd Hughes	1:41.80
1965	Viking Spirit	5	Kenneth Church	James I. Nazworthy	Thomas E. Brittingham III	1:40.80
1964	Mustard Plaster	5	Jack Leonard	William A. Peterson	Mrs. Fraser Morrison	1:41.60
1963	Winonly	6	Jack Leonard	Julius E. Tinsley	Fred W. Hooper	1:41.80
1962	Cadiz	6	William Harmatz	Robert L. Wheeler	Vicgray Farm	1:41.60
1961	First Balcony	4	Edward Burns	Melvin F. Stute	M/M. Robert O. Schulze	1:40.40
1960	Fleet Nasrullah	5	Johnny Longden	James I. Nazworthy	M/M. Ellwood B. Johnston	1:40.60
1959	Hillsdale	4	Tommy Barrow	Martin L. Fallon Jr.	Clarence Whitted Smith	1:40.80
1958	Seaneen	4	Johnny Longden	William B. Finnegan	Neil S. McCarthy	1:41.00
1957	Social Climber	4	Bill Shoemaker	Charlie Whittingham	Llangollen Farm	1:40.40
1956	Porterhouse	5	Ismael Valenzuela	Charlie Whittingham	Llangollen Farm	1:40.80
1955	Swaps	3	David Erb	Mesh Tenney	Rex C. Ellsworth	1:40.40
1954	Imbros	4	Johnny Longden	William Molter	Andrew J. Crevolin	1:41.00
