= Warfare (disambiguation) =

Warfare refers to the common activities and characteristics of types of war, or of wars in general.

Warfare may also refer to:

- Warfare (band), a British heavy metal band
- Warfare (film), a 2025 British-American war film
- Warfare (horse), an American Thoroughbred racehorse

== See also ==
- War (disambiguation)
