= Native Diver =

American-bred Thoroughbred racehorse

- Sire: Imbros
- Grandsire: Polynesian
- Dam: Fleet Diver
- Damsire: Devil Diver
- Sex: Gelding
- Foaled: April 16, 1959
- Country: United States
- Colour: Brown
- Breeder: Mr. & Mrs. Louis K. Shapiro
- Owner: Mr. & Mrs. Louis K. Shapiro
- Trainer: Buster Millerick
- Jockey: Jerry Lambert
- Record: 81 Starts: 37-7-12
- Earnings: $1,026,500

Major wins
- Debonair Stakes (1962); Malibu Stakes (1962); Inglewood Handicap (1963, 1964, 1966); San Diego Handicap (1964, 1965, 1966); San Francisco Mile Handicap (1963, 1967)); Palos Verdes Handicap (1964, 1965); Hollywood Gold Cup (1965, 1966, 1967); Los Angeles Handicap (1965, 1967); San Carlos Handicap (1965, 1967); American Handicap (1965)); San Bernardino Handicap (1966); San Pasqual Handicap (1966); Del Mar Handicap (1967)

Honours
- U.S. Racing Hall of Fame (1978) #60 - Top 100 U.S. Racehorses of the 20th Century; Grade III Native Diver Handicap at Del Mar Racetrack
- Last updated on 29 October 2020

Native Diver (April 16, 1959 – September 13, 1967) was an American Thoroughbred racehorse. Native Diver's nicknames included "the Diver," "The California Comet" and "The Black Horse." He compiled 34 stakes wins.

== Background ==
Native Diver was bred and owned by Louis K. Shapiro and his wife, who had claimed his dam, Fleet Diver, a daughter of Devil Diver out of Our Fleet by Triple Crown winner Count Fleet. Despite the fact that her immediate lineage included members of Blood-Horse magazine List of the Top 100 U.S. Racehorses of the 20th Century (Count Fleet at no. 5 and Devil Diver at no. 55), as well as the fact that Fleet Diver had just given jockey Johnny Longden his 4,000th racing win, Our Fleet's claiming price was $3,500. The Shapiros bought the mare in January 1954. Five years later, she produced Native Diver. He was by Imbros, a good racehorse who set a world record in the Californian Stakes of 1954.

== Racing career ==
At a young age, Native Diver injured his back and therefore often ran while holding his head high to ease the strain on his spine. He was gelded to calm him down, but it seemed to make little difference.

At two, Native Diver won his first three starts by a combined margin of 23 3/4 lengths and was on his way to setting six career track records (three of them while carrying 130 pounds). He was a versatile runner who could sprint at six furlongs or rate at nine, setting track records at both distances. He won stakes at six California racetracks, becoming the second horse ever to accomplish that feat.

At Hollywood Park in Inglewood, Native Diver won the Hollywood Gold Cup three times in a row, from 1965 to 1967, finishing faster each time. Jockey Jerry Lambert was on board for each Gold Cup win.

== Death and legacy ==
Native Diver was still racing at age eight; his owners vowed to retire him when he started to slow down. Eight days after he won the Del Mar Handicap in 1967, equaling the track record, he fell ill with colic. He was taken to the equine hospital at University of California at Davis and died there the next day.

Native Diver won 34 stakes races, was the seventh racing millionaire, and was the first California-bred horse to earn a million dollars. He is buried in the Garden Paddock at Hollywood Park under a monument designed by Millard Sheets. Upon Hollywood Park's closing in December 2013, his remains and the monument were to be moved to the Del Mar infield near the top of the backstretch near several other horses and dogs. On March 8, the exhumation of the remains began led by University of Southern California archaeologists Lynn Swartz Dodd and Tom Garrison.

The Native Diver Stakes at Del Mar Racetrack was named in his honor.

== Pedigree ==
Pedigree of Native Diver (USA), brown gelding, 1959
Sire Imbros (USA) 1950	Polynesian (USA); 1942	Unbreakable	Sickle
Sire Imbros (USA) 1950	Polynesian (USA); 1942	Unbreakable	Blue Glass
Sire Imbros (USA) 1950	Polynesian (USA); 1942	Black Polly	Polymelian
Sire Imbros (USA) 1950	Polynesian (USA); 1942	Black Polly	Black Queen
Sire Imbros (USA) 1950	Fire Falls (USA); 1942	Bull Dog	Teddy
Sire Imbros (USA) 1950	Fire Falls (USA); 1942	Bull Dog	Plucky Liege
Sire Imbros (USA) 1950	Fire Falls (USA); 1942	Stricken	Pennant
Sire Imbros (USA) 1950	Fire Falls (USA); 1942	Stricken	Moody Mary
Dam Fleet Diver (USA) 1950	Devil Diver (USA); 1939	St Germans	Swynford
Dam Fleet Diver (USA) 1950	Devil Diver (USA); 1939	St Germans	Hamoaze
Dam Fleet Diver (USA) 1950	Devil Diver (USA); 1939	Dabchick	Royal Minstrel
Dam Fleet Diver (USA) 1950	Devil Diver (USA); 1939	Dabchick	Ruddy Duck
Dam Fleet Diver (USA) 1950	Our Fleet (USA); 1946	Count Fleet	Reigh Count
Dam Fleet Diver (USA) 1950	Our Fleet (USA); 1946	Count Fleet	Quickly
Dam Fleet Diver (USA) 1950	Our Fleet (USA); 1946	Duchess Anita	Count Gallahad
Dam Fleet Diver (USA) 1950	Our Fleet (USA); 1946	Duchess Anita	French Duchess (Family: 2-j)

== See also ==
Repeat winners of horse races
