= Erins Isle (horse) =

Irish-bred Thoroughbred racehorse

- Sire: Busted
- Grandsire: Crepello
- Dam: Chemise
- Damsire: Shantung
- Sex: Stallion
- Foaled: 1978
- Country: Ireland
- Colour: Bay
- Breeder: not found
- Owner: 1) Hugh McCaffrey; 2) Brian Sweeney
- Trainer: 1) Jim Bolger; 2) Charles E. Whittingham
- Record: 32: 9-9-2
- Earnings: US$1,222,839

Major wins
- Ballymoss Stakes (1981); Gallinule Stakes (1981); Californian Stakes (1982); Sunset Handicap (1982); San Luis Rey Handicap (1983); Hollywood Invitational Turf Handicap (1983); San Juan Capistrano Handicap (1983)

Erins Isle (foaled 1978 in Ireland) was a Thoroughbred racehorse who competed successfully in Ireland and the United States. While racing in Ireland in 1981 for trainer Jim Bolger, Erins Isle was originally owned by Hugh Mc Caffrey and sold to a syndicate headed by Brian Sweeney of Dublin. In 1982, Erins Isle was sent to the United States where he raced from a base in California for U. S. Racing Hall of Fame trainer, Charlie Whittingham.

In 1983, Erins Isle was a candidate for an Eclipse Award following a year in which he competed with the best turf horses in the United States and notably won the Grade I Hollywood Invitational Turf Handicap.

Retired after the 1983 racing season, Erins Isle stood at stud, meeting with some success as a sire. Among his offspring, in 1990 daughter Laugh And Be Merry won the Grade I Flower Bowl Invitational Handicap and son Rowdy Irishman won the 1997 Breeders' Cup Steeplechase. Erins Isle was also the damsire of Soldier of Fortune whose wins included the 2008 Irish Derby Stakes and Coronation Cup. His daughter Erin's Irish Lass, is the grand dam of Affluent.
