= Quack (horse) =

American-bred Thoroughbred racehorse

- Sire: T.V. Lark
- Grandsire: Indian Hemp
- Dam: Quillon
- Damsire: Princequillo
- Sex: Stallion
- Foaled: February 26, 1969
- Country: United States
- Colour: Bay
- Breeder: Bwamazon Farm (Millard Waldheim)
- Owner: Bwamazon Farm
- Trainer: Charles E. Whittingham
- Record: 23: 8-6-2
- Earnings: US$514,400

Major wins
- Will Rogers Stakes (1972); California Derby (1972); Hollywood Gold Cup (1972); San Bernardino Handicap (1973); Californian Stakes (1973, 1974)
- Last updated on May 26, 2010

Quack (February 26, 1969 – January 17, 1995) was an American Thoroughbred racehorse who holds the world record for a three-year-old with the fastest mile and a quarter ever run on dirt.

== Background ==
He was sired by T.V. Lark, the 1961 American Champion Male Turf Horse, and out of the mare Quillon, a daughter of the outstanding Champion broodmare sire Princequillo. Quack was a very large horse whose style was to lag behind early and finish with a devastating closing kick. Though Quack had success early in his career with Hall of Fame jockey Bill Shoemaker, he found even more success with Hall of Fame jockey Don Pierce, whose first ride on him was the 1972 Hollywood Gold Cup.

Quack was a bay with a spot of white on his forehead bred and raced by Millard Waldheim's Bwamazon Farm. He was trained by future U.S. Racing Hall of Fame inductee Charlie Whittingham.

== Racing career ==
Not eligible for the 1972 Kentucky Derby, Quack scored the most important win of his career that year in the Hollywood Gold Cup in which he defeated older horses while equaling the United States and world records for a mile and a quarter on dirt. Going into 2010, his record still stands for three-year-olds. Among his other wins, Quack captured back-to-back editions of the Californian Stakes in 1973 and 1974.

== Stud record ==
Retired to stud duty, Quack sired several good runners including:

- Plankton (b. 1976) - wins include the Grade 1 Ladies Handicap, G2 Demoiselle Stakes, Molly Pitcher Handicap;
- Header Card (b. 1979) - won the Grade I Oak Leaf Stakes;
- Duckpower (b. 1984) - multiple stakes wins in Canada including the Toronto Cup Handicap, Col. R.S. McLaughlin Handicap, Marine Stakes;
- Quick Call (b. 1984) - multiple stakes winner including back-to-back editions of the Forego Handicap;
- Beyond Perfection (b. 1988) - won the Del Mar Debutante Stakes.

Pensioned in 1994, in January of the following year Quack was humanely euthanized due to complications of old age.
