= The Wicked North =

American Thoroughbred racehorse

- Sire: Far North
- Grandsire: Northern Dancer
- Dam: Wicked Witchcraft
- Damsire: Good Behaving
- Sex: Stallion
- Foaled: 1989
- Country: United States
- Colour: Chestnut
- Breeder: E Zurek
- Owner: Philip Hersh
- Trainer: David Bernstein
- Record: 17: 8-4-1

Major wins
- Bing Crosby Handicap(1993); San Francisco Handicap (1993); Californian Stakes (1994); Oaklawn Handicap (1994); San Antonio Handicap (1994)

Awards
- U.S. Champion Older Male Horse (1994)
- Last updated on December 9, 2006

The Wicked North (1989 – 2011) was an American champion Thoroughbred racehorse. He won three Grade I stakes in 1994, for which he was voted U.S. Champion Older Male Horse. He died at the Hagyard Equine Medical Center in Lexington, Kentucky in 2011.

== Background ==
The Wicked North, a chestnut horse with a white blaze and one white sock, was sired by the Northern Dancer stallion Far North out of the stakes-winning broodmare Wicked Witchcraft. He was an unusually large thoroughbred, reportedly weighing about 1,300 lbs at one point in his career. As a yearling, The Wicked North was bought at auction by the retired plumbing contractor Philip Hersh for $10,000. He was trained in California by David Bernstein and ridden in all his Grade I wins by Kent Desormeaux.

== Racing career ==
Until he was five years old The Wicked North was mainly campaigned over sprint distances with his most significant win coming in the Grade III Bing Crosby Handicap.

In 1994 Bernstein moved The Wicked North up in distance, and he showed much improved form. He won the Californian Stakes, the Oaklawn Handicap and the San Antonio Handicap. He also finished first in the Santa Anita Handicap but was disqualified.

He started odds-on favourite for the Hollywood Gold Cup but finished fourth after sustaining a serious injury to his suspensory ligament. He was unable to race again and was retired to stud.

== Honors and awards ==
The Wicked North was voted U.S. Champion Older Male Horse for 1994 at the Eclipse Awards.

== Stud career ==
The Wicked North stood as a stallion at the True North farm at Versailles, Kentucky until 2008 when he was retired after suffering from equine protozoal myeloencephalitis.

He spent the remainder of his life at Old Friends in Georgetown, Kentucky.
