= Sagace =

French-bred Thoroughbred racehorse 1980–1989

- Sire: Luthier
- Grandsire: Klairon
- Dam: Seneca
- Damsire: Chaparral
- Sex: Stallion
- Foaled: 1980
- Country: France
- Colour: Bay
- Breeder: Daniel Wildenstein
- Owner: Daniel Wildenstein
- Trainer: Patrick Biancone
- Record: 11: 8-1-1
- Earnings: 837 479 €

Major wins
- Prix du Conseil de Paris (1983); Prix Niel (1983); Prix Foy (1984, 1985); Prix de l'Arc de Triomphe (1984); Prix Ganay (1985); Prix d'Ispahan (1985)

Awards
- European Champion Older Horse (co-winner, 1985); Timeform rating: 135
- Last updated on 14 April 2025

Sagace (1980–1989) was a French Thoroughbred champion racehorse. His sire Luthier had been the Leading sire in France in 1976.

Trained by Patrick Biancone and ridden by Yves St. Martin for prominent owner/breeder Daniel Wildenstein, at age three Sagace won two important races, then the following year scored a two-length victory in France's most prestigious horse race, the Prix de l'Arc de Triomphe. Sagace came back to win his second Arc in 1985 but following a claim of interference by the handlers of Rainbow Quest, the Hippodrome de Longchamp stewards disqualified him to second. Nonetheless, Sagace's performances for 1985 earned him European co-champion older horse honours.

When Sagace retired to stud, owner Wildenstein sold a share of him to Alan Li Fook-sum, a prominent Hong Kong businessman.

Sagace was sent to Calumet Farm in Lexington, Kentucky, where he sired Arcangues, who won the 1993 Breeders' Cup Classic. Sagace performed stallion duties for just over three years before dying prematurely at the age of nine. His daughter Saganeca produced Sagamix, who was unbeaten at age three while winning the 1998 Prix de l'Arc de Triomphe.

== Sire line tree ==
- Sagace
  - Arcangues
    - Ar Alan
    - Lucky Step
    - Aiai Lucky
