= United States Champion Thoroughbred Trainer by earnings =

There is recognition for the United States Champion Thoroughbred Trainer by earnings but no formal award is given to the trainer in Thoroughbred flat racing whose horses earned the most purse money in North American Thoroughbred racing.

Note that the figures includes earnings in Canada.

| Year | Trainer | Earnings |
|---|---|---|
| 1908 | James G. Rowe Sr. | $284,335 |
| 1909 | Sam Hildreth | $123,942 |
| 1910 | Sam Hildreth | $148,010 |
| 1911 | Sam Hildreth | $49,418 |
| 1912 | John F. Schorr | $58,110 |
| 1913 | James G. Rowe Sr. | $45,936 |
| 1914 | Richard C. Benson | $59,315 |
| 1915 | James G. Rowe Sr. | $75,596 |
| 1916 | Sam Hildreth | $70,950 |
| 1917 | Sam Hildreth | $61,698 |
| 1918 | H. Guy Bedwell | $80,296 |
| 1919 | H. Guy Bedwell | $208,728 |
| 1920 | Louis Feustel | $186,087 |
| 1921 | Sam Hildreth | $262,768 |
| 1922 | Sam Hildreth | $247,014 |
| 1923 | Sam Hildreth | $392,124 |
| 1924 | Sam Hildreth | $255,608 |
| 1925 | Gwyn R. Tompkins | $199,245 |
| 1926 | Scott P. Harlan | $205,681 |
| 1927 | William H. Bringloe | $216,563 |
| 1928 | John F. Schorr | $258,425 |
| 1929 | James G. Rowe, Jr. | $314,881 |
| 1930 | James E. Fitzsimmons | $397,355 |
| 1931 | James W. "Big Jim" Healy | $297,300 |
| 1932 | James E. Fitzsimmons | $266,650 |
| 1933 | Robert A. Smith | $135,720 |
| 1934 | Robert A. Smith | $249,938 |
| 1935 | Bud Stotler | $303,005 |
| 1936 | James E. Fitzsimmons | $193,415 |
| 1937 | Robert V. McGarvey | $209,925 |
| 1938 | Earl Sande | $226,495 |
| 1939 | James E. Fitzsimmons | $266,205 |
| 1940 | Tom Smith | $269,200 |
| 1941 | Ben A. Jones | $475,318 |
| 1942 | John M. Gaver Sr. | $406,547 |
| 1943 | Ben A. Jones | $267,915 |
| 1944 | Ben A. Jones | $601,660 |
| 1945 | Tom Smith | $510,655 |
| 1946 | Hirsch Jacobs | $560,077 |
| 1947 | Horace A. Jones | $1,334,805 |
| 1948 | Horace A. Jones | $1,118,670 |
| 1949 | Horace A. Jones | $978,587 |
| 1950 | Preston M. Burch | $637,754 |
| 1951 | John M. Gaver Sr. | $616,392 |
| 1952 | Ben A. Jones | $662,137 |
| 1953 | Harry Trotsek | $1,028,873 |
| 1954 | William Molter | $1,107,860 |
| 1955 | James E. Fitzsimmons | $1,270,055 |
| 1956 | William Molter | $1,227,402 |
| 1957 | Horace A. Jones | $1,150,910 |
| 1958 | William Molter | $1,116,544 |
| 1959 | William Molter | $847,290 |
| 1960 | Hirsch Jacobs | $748,349 |
| 1961 | Horace A. Jones | $759,856 |
| 1962 | Mesh Tenney | $1,099,474 |
| 1963 | Mesh Tenney | $860,703 |
| 1964 | William C. Winfrey | $1,350,534 |
| 1965 | Hirsch Jacobs | $1,331,628 |
| 1966 | Edward A. Neloy | $2,456,250 |
| 1967 | Edward A. Neloy | $1,776,089 |
| 1968 | Edward A. Neloy | $1,233,101 |
| 1969 | J. Elliott Burch | $1,067,936 |
| 1970 | Charlie Whittingham | $1,302,354 |
| 1971 | Charlie Whittingham | $1,737,115 |
| 1972 | Charlie Whittingham | $1,734,020 |
| 1973 | Charlie Whittingham | $1,865,385 |
| 1974 | Pancho Martin | $2,408,419 |
| 1975 | Charlie Whittingham | $2,437,244 |
| 1976 | Jack Van Berg | $2,976,196 |
| 1977 | Laz Barrera | $2,715,848 |
| 1978 | Laz Barrera | $3,307,164 |
| 1979 | Laz Barrera | $3,608,517 |
| 1980 | Laz Barrera | $2,969,151 |
| 1981 | Charlie Whittingham | $3,993,302 |
| 1982 | Charlie Whittingham | $4,587,457 |
| 1983 | D. Wayne Lukas | $4,267,261 |
| 1984 | D. Wayne Lukas | $5,835,921 |
| 1985 | D. Wayne Lukas | $11,155,188 |
| 1986 | D. Wayne Lukas | $12,345,180 |
| 1987 | D. Wayne Lukas | $17,502,110 |
| 1988 | D. Wayne Lukas | $17,842,358 |
| 1989 | D. Wayne Lukas | $16,103,998 |
| 1990 | D. Wayne Lukas | $14,508,871 |
| 1991 | D. Wayne Lukas | $15,942,223 |
| 1992 | D. Wayne Lukas | $9,806,436 |
| 1993 | Robert J. Frankel | $8,933,252 |
| 1994 | D. Wayne Lukas | $9,247,457 |
| 1995 | D. Wayne Lukas | $12,834,483 |
| 1996 | D. Wayne Lukas | $15,966,344 |
| 1997 | D. Wayne Lukas | $9,993,569 |
| 1998 | Bob Baffert | $15,000,870 |
| 1999 | Bob Baffert | $16,934,607 |
| 2000 | Bob Baffert | $11,831,605 |
| 2001 | Bob Baffert | $16,354,996 |
| 2002 | Robert J. Frankel | $17,748,340 |
| 2003 | Robert J. Frankel | $19,143,289 |
| 2004 | Todd A. Pletcher | $17,511,923 |
| 2005 | Todd A. Pletcher | $20,867,842 |
| 2006 | Todd A. Pletcher | $26,820,243 |
| 2007 | Todd A. Pletcher | $28,111,697 |
| 2008 | Steve Asmussen | $24,235,247 |
| 2009 | Steve Asmussen | $21,884,695 |
| 2010 | Todd A. Pletcher | $23,157,098 |
| 2011 | Todd A. Pletcher | $17,186,956 |
| 2012 | Todd A. Pletcher | $20,954,322 |
| 2013 | Todd A. Pletcher | $25,248,816 |
| 2014 | Todd A. Pletcher | $22,476,736 |
| 2015 | Todd A. Pletcher | $26,278,647 |
| 2016 | Chad C. Brown | $23,134,394 |
| 2017 | Chad C. Brown | $26,202,164 |
| 2018 | Chad C. Brown | $27,546,057 |
| 2019 | Chad C. Brown | $31,112,144 |
| 2020 | Steve Asmussen | $19,960,542 |
| 2021 | Brad H. Cox | $33,125,312 |
| 2022 | Chad C. Brown | $31,057,362 |
| 2023 | Brad H. Cox | $30,976,261 |
| 2024 | Chad C. Brown | $30,933,210 |

== See also ==
- United States Champion Thoroughbred Trainer by wins
