= Warfare (horse) =

American thoroughbred racehorse

- Sire: Determine
- Grandsire: Alibhai
- Dam: War Whisk
- Damsire: War Glory
- Sex: Stallion
- Foaled: 1957
- Country: United States
- Color: Gray
- Breeder: C. H. Jones & Sons
- Owner: Clifton Jones Jr.
- Trainer: Haskell "Hack" Ross (1959); William C. Winfrey (1960)
- Record: 16: 7-2-4
- Earnings: US$414,445

Major wins
- Champagne Stakes (1959); Charles S. Howard Handicap (1959); Cowdin Stakes (1959); Garden State Stakes (1959); Swift Stakes (1960)

Awards
- American Champion Two-Year-Old Colt (1959)

Warfare (1957–1971) was an American National Champion Thoroughbred racehorse that broke the track record at New York's Aqueduct Racetrack three times, each at a different distance.

Warfare was bred in California by Clifton H. Jones & Sons. Race conditioned by trainer Haskell "Hack" Ross, in early 1959 Clifton Jones Jr. bought out his family members for $12,000 to become Warfare's sole owner. He raced the son of 1954 Kentucky Derby winner Determine under the nom de course Bellehurst Stable.

== Sire line tree ==
- Warfare
  - Assagai
    - Big Whippendeal
    - Almost Grown

== Pedigree ==
Pedigree of Horse, chestnut colt, March 28, 2015
| Sire Determine | Alibhai | Hyperion | Gainsborough* |
| Sire Determine | Alibhai | Hyperion | Selene |
| Sire Determine | Alibhai | Teresina | Tracery |
| Sire Determine | Alibhai | Teresina | Blue Tit |
| Sire Determine | Koubis | Mahmoud | Blenheim |
| Sire Determine | Koubis | Mahmoud | Mah Mahal* |
| Sire Determine | Koubis | Brown Biscuit | Sir Andrew |
| Sire Determine | Koubis | Brown Biscuit | Swing On* |
| Dam War Whisk | War Glory | Man o' War | Fair Play |
| Dam War Whisk | War Glory | Man o' War | Mahubah |
| Dam War Whisk | War Glory | Annette K. | Harry of Hereford |
| Dam War Whisk | War Glory | Annette K. | Bathing Girl |
| Dam War Whisk | Tidy Whisk | Whiskalong | Whisk Broom* |
| Dam War Whisk | Tidy Whisk | Whiskalong | Lady Hamburg |
| Dam War Whisk | Tidy Whisk | Tidy Maid | Pennant |
| Dam War Whisk | Tidy Whisk | Tidy Maid | Bonnie Broom* (family: 4-m) |

* Warfare is inbred 5S x 4D x 5D to the stallion Whisk Broom, meaning that he appears fifth generation (via Swing On) on the sire side of his pedigree, and fourth generation and fifth generation (via Bonnie Broom) on the dam side of his pedigree.

* Warfare is inbred 4S x 5S to the stallion Gainsborough, meaning that he appears fourth generation and fifth generation (via Mah Mahal) on the sire side of his pedigree.
