= Arcangues (horse) =

American-bred Thoroughbred racehorse

- Sire: Sagace
- Grandsire: Luthier
- Dam: Albertine
- Damsire: Irish River
- Sex: Stallion
- Foaled: 1988
- Country: France
- Colour: Chestnut
- Breeder: Allez France Stables
- Owner: Daniel Wildenstein
- Trainer: 1) André Fabre; 2) Richard E. Mandella (1994)
- Record: 19: 6–2–2
- Earnings: $1,981,423

Major wins
- Prix Eugène Adam (1991); Prix du Prince d'Orange (1992); Prix d'Ispahan (1993); John Henry Handicap (1994); Breeders' Cup wins: Breeders' Cup Classic (1993)
- Last updated on September 23, 2006

Arcangues (pronounced ar-KONG) (foaled March 12, 1988 – October 2006) was a French Thoroughbred racehorse and sire. He won the Group 1 Prix d'Ispahan, Prix du Prince d'Orange, Prix Eugène Adam and John Henry Handicap, but is most famous for winning the 1993 Breeders' Cup Classic as a tremendous longshot, a victory that has been called one of the biggest upsets in horse racing history.

== Background ==
The son of owner Daniel Wildenstein's 1984 Prix de l'Arc de Triomphe winner Sagace, he was given the name of the village of Arcangues in the Pyrénées-Atlantiques departement of the Aquitaine region.

== Racing career ==
Arcangues had raced only on grass in Europe before being sent to California to compete on the dirt track at Santa Anita Park in the 1993 Breeders' Cup Classic. Despite big wins in the Group 1 Prix d'Ispahan (over champion Hatoof), Prix du Prince d'Orange (over champion Arazi) and Prix Eugène Adam, Bettors sent the horse off at odds of 133–1 in the richest of the Breeders' Cup races. Under last-minute jockey Jerry Bailey, the horse caught Bertrando in the home stretch to score the biggest upset in Breeders' Cup history. His $269.20 payoff for a $2 wager remains a Breeders' Cup record. Wildenstein, Arcangues' owner, earned $1.56 million.

After his win, Arcangues remained in the United States and raced during the 1994 season under trainer Richard Mandella. In three starts, he won the John Henry Handicap [G2] on grass, but finished fifth back on dirt in the Hollywood Gold Cup, his last race.

== Stud record ==
Arcangues was retired and sent to Japan to stand at stud at Nakamura Chikusan in 1995.

He sired (among others) Lucky Step (b. 1999, three wins in Japan) and Chacott (b. 2000, one win in Japan) out of Petite Furu (b. 1991, four wins in Japan), Aiai Lucky (b. 2002, one win in Japan and in training as of 2002) out of Dancing Queen, and Moere Leading (b. 1999, two wins in Japan and in training as of 2002) and Chanel Lady (b. 1997, three wins in Japan as of 2002), both out of Leading Queen (b. 1989, placed in Japan, dam of three winners). Of Arcangues' 264 foals, 94 started and 23 won.

In March 2009, it was reported that Arcangues was euthanized in Japan in October 2006. He had been pensioned from stud that spring as a result of founder.

== Pedigree ==
Pedigree of Arcangues, chestnut stallion, 1988
Sire Sagace	Luthier	Klairon	Clarion
Sire Sagace	Luthier	Klairon	Kalmia
Sire Sagace	Luthier	Flute Enchantee	Cranach
Sire Sagace	Luthier	Flute Enchantee	Montagnana
Sire Sagace	Seneca	Chaparral	Val de Loir
Sire Sagace	Seneca	Chaparral	Niccolina
Sire Sagace	Seneca	Schonbrunn	Pantheon
Sire Sagace	Seneca	Schonbrunn	Scheherezade
Dam Albertine	Irish River	Riverman	Never Bend
Dam Albertine	Irish River	Riverman	River Lady
Dam Albertine	Irish River	Irish Star	Klario
Dam Albertine	Irish River	Irish Star	Botany Bay
Dam Albertine	Almyre	Wild Risk	Rialto
Dam Albertine	Almyre	Wild Risk	Wild Violet
Dam Albertine	Almyre	Ad Gloriam	Alizier
Dam Albertine	Almyre	Ad Gloriam	Ad Altiora (family: 1-h)
