= Will Rogers Stakes =

- Class: Discontinued Grade 3 stakes
- Location: Hollywood Park Racetrack; Inglewood, California, United States
- Inaugurated: 1938
- Race type: Thoroughbred - Flat racing

Race information
- Distance: 1 mile (8 furlongs)
- Surface: Turf
- Track: Left-handed
- Qualification: Three-year-olds
- Weight: Assigned
- Purse: $100,000

The Will Rogers Stakes was an American Grade IIIT Thoroughbred horse race.

Run annually in the latter part of May at Hollywood Park Racetrack in Inglewood, California, the race is open to three-year-old horses. It is run over a distance of one mile on turf and currently carries a purse of $100,000. Run as a handicap prior to 2001. Run at one mile since 1995. Run exclusively on turf since 1969. Run for 3-year-olds & up in 1938, 1944.

The race was named for legendary American humorist and horseman Will Rogers who died in 1935.

Among the notable winners of this race are two U.S. Racing Hall of Fame inductees. Swaps won the 1955 Kentucky Derby and, in his next outing, won the Will Rogers Stakes by twelve lengths. Round Table won the race in 1957 by three and a half lengths.

In 2010, the Will Rogers was lengthened to 1 1/16-mile.

== Winners of the Will Rogers Stakes since 2000 ==
Year	Winner	Jockey	Trainer	Owner	Time
2010	Leroy's Dynameaux	Joel Rosario	Mark Glatt	Ellenay Racing	1:40.43
2009	Race not held				
2008	Polonius	Jon Court	Michael Pender	B. J. Wright	1:34.95
2007	Worldly	Victor Espinoza	Ben D. A. Cecil	Christopher Wright	1:35.19
2006	Stratham	David Cohen	Tim Yakteen	Jerry Jamgotchian	1:34.19
2005	Osidy	Alex Solis	Richard Mandella	B. Wayne Hughes	1:34.67
2004	Laura's Lucky Boy	Pat Valenzuela	Jason Orman	Mercedes Stable	1:33.45
2003	Private Chef	Victor Espinoza	John Shirreffs	Jerry & Ann Moss	1:35.57
2002	Doc Holiday	David R. Flores	Aimee Dollase	Wallace Dollase	1:34.64
2001	Media Mogul (DH)	Alex Solis	Jenine Sahadi	Team Valor et al.	1:35.10
2001	Dr. Park (DH)	Tyler Baze	John W. Sadler	C R K Stable	1:35.10
2000	Purely Cozzene	Victor Espinoza	Bob Baffert	Ed & Natalie Friendly	1:34.67

== Earlier winners (partial list) ==
- 1999 - Eagleton
- 1998 - Magical
- 1997 - Brave Act
- 1996 - Let Bob Do It
- 1995 - Via Lombardia
- 1994 - Unfinished Symph
- 1993 - Future Storm
- 1992 - The Name's Jimmy
- 1991 - Compelling Sound
- 1990 - Itsallgreektome
- 1989 - Notorious Pleasure
- 1988 - Word Pirate
- 1987 - Something Lucky
- 1986 - Mazaad
- 1985 - Pine Belt
- 1984 - Tsunami Slew
- 1983 - Barberstown
- 1982 - Give Me Strength
- 1982 - Sword Blade
- 1981 - Splendid Spruce
- 1980 - Stiff Diamond
- 1979 - Ibacache
- 1978 - April Axe
- 1977 - Nordic Prince
- 1976 - Madera Sun
- 1975 - Uniformity
- 1974 - Stardust Mel
- 1973 - Groshawk
- 1972 - Quack
- 1971 - Dr. Knighton
- 1971 - Fast Fellow
- 1970 - Lime
- 1970 - Whittingham
- 1969 - Tell
- 1968 - Poleax
- 1967 - Jungle Road
- 1966 - Ri Tux
- 1966 - Aqua Vite
- 1965 - Terry's Secret
- 1964 - Count Charles
- 1963 - Viking Spirit
- 1963 - Bre'r Rabbit
- 1962 - Wallet Lifter
- 1962 - Prince Of Plenty
- 1961 - Four-and-Twenty
- 1960 - Flow Line
- 1959 - Ole Fols
- 1958 - Hillsdale
- 1957 - Round Table
- 1956 - Terrang
- 1955 - Swaps
- 1954 - Don McCoy
- 1953 - Imbros
- 1952 - Forelock
- 1951 - Gold Note
- 1950 - (Not run)
- 1949 - Blue Dart (Run at Santa Anita)
- 1948 - Speculation
- 1947 - On Trust
- 1946 - Burra Sahib
- 1945 - Quick Reward
- 1944 - Phar Rong
- 1943 - (Not run)
- 1942 - (Not run)
- 1941 - Battle Colors
- 1940 - Sweepida
- 1939 - Time Alone
- 1938 - Dogaway
