= Harry Henson Stakes =

- Class: non-graded stakes
- Location: Hollywood Park Racetrack; Inglewood, California, United States
- Inaugurated: 1952
- Race type: Thoroughbred - Flat racing
- Website: www.hollywoodpark.com

Race information
- Distance: 6 furlong sprint
- Surface: Turf
- Track: Left-handed
- Qualification: Three-year-olds
- Weight: Assigned
- Purse: US$70,000

The Harry Henson Stakes was an American Thoroughbred horse race run annually during the third week of April as part of the opening day races of the spring/summer meet at Hollywood Park Racetrack in Inglewood, California. Open to three-year-old horses, it was a non-graded stakes raced on turf that has been contested at a distance of six furlongs since 2007. The race offered a purse of US$70,000.

Inaugurated in 1952 as the Debonair Stakes, it was renamed in 1991 to honor Harry Henson, a former jockey who was Hollywood Park's race caller from 1958 to 1982.

Past winners include Imbros in 1953, Kentucky Derby winner Determine in 1954, and a son of Imbros in 1962, the U.S. Racing Hall of Fame inductee, Native Diver.

== Records ==
Speed record: (at current distance of 6 furlongs.

- 1:08.16 - Backbackbackgone (2009)

== Recent winners ==
Year	Winner	Jockey	Trainer	Owner	Time
2009	Backbackbackgone	Rafael Bejarano	Peter Miller	Gerson Racing et al.	1:08.16
2008	Sky Cape	Victor Espinoza	Kristin Mulhall	Visionary Racing/Steve Taub	1:08.49
2007	Hurry Home Warren	Victor Espinoza	Jesús Mendoza	Christopher Drakos	1:08.60
2006	Corazondelcampeon	Corey Nakatani	David La Croix	Scott P. Merrell	1:01.04
2005	Juliesugardaddy	Alex Bisono	Barry Abrams	D. Adams, V. Johnson, H. Nakk	1:01.87
