= Hillsdale (horse) =

American-bred Thoroughbred racehorse

- Sire: Take Away
- Grandsire: Aneroid
- Dam: Johann
- Damsire: Johnstown
- Sex: Stallion
- Foaled: 1955
- Country: United States
- Colour: Bay
- Breeder: Murlogg Farm
- Owner: Clarence Whitted Smith
- Trainer: Martin L. Fallon, Jr.
- Record: 41: 23-6-4
- Earnings: $646,935

Major wins
- Michigan Derby (1958); Will Rogers Stakes (1958); Malibu Stakes (1958); San Fernando Stakes (1959); Santa Anita Maturity (1959); Boardwalk Handicap (1958); Aqueduct Handicap (1959); American Invitational Handicap (1959); Californian Stakes (1959); Hollywood Gold Cup (1959); Los Angeles Handicap (1959); San Carlos Handicap (1959); Argonaut Handicap (1959)

Honours
- US Horse Racing Hall of Fame (2022); Hillsdale Stakes at Hoosier Park (2004– )
- Last updated on 6 August 2022

Hillsdale (foaled 1955 in Indiana) was an American Hall of Fame Thoroughbred racehorse. He was most notable for his performances in 1959, when he won ten of his thirteen races. Hillsdale was inducted into the US National Museum of Racing and Hall of Fame in 2022.

== Background ==
Hillsdale's sire was Take Away, who did not distinguish himself on the race track, but grandsire Aneroid did. Aneroid's wins on the U.S. East Coast included the Suburban and Carter Handicaps, plus he defeated Seabiscuit in the 1938 San Antonio Handicap in California. Hillsdale's dam was Johann, a daughter of U.S. Racing Hall of Fame inductee Johnstown.

Purchased by Clarence Smith, Hillsdale had an undistinguished pedigree that kept his selling price at $25,000. Trained by Martin L. Fallon, Jr., the colt raced head-to-head with four other outstanding horses: Harry Guggenheim's colt Bald Eagle, and future Hall of Fame inductees Round Table, Tim Tam, and Sword Dancer.

== Racing career ==
At age three, Hillsdale won five important races on both coasts, the last of which was the Malibu Stakes, the first leg of the Strub Series.

In January 1959, he took advantage of a seventeen-pound weight advantage to defeat Round Table in the San Carlos Handicap. He followed up by winning the San Fernando Stakes and the Santa Anita Maturity, becoming the second of just five horses who have ever won the Strub Series. In thirteen starts in 1959, the four-year-old Hillsdale won ten important stakes, including seven in a row, and finished second in his other three. His most important win came in the Hollywood Gold Cup. On the East Coast, he beat Bald Eagle in winning the Aqueduct Handicap. In the Woodward Stakes at Aqueduct Racetrack, Hillsdale beat Round Table again but finished second to Sword Dancer.

== Stud record ==
After Hillsdale retired to stud duty, his first foals were born in 1962 and his last in 1973. Although he produced several stakes winners, none achieved his level of success.
