= John Henry Handicap =

- Class: Discontinued horse
- Location: Hollywood Park Racetrack; Inglewood, California, United States
- Inaugurated: 1986
- Race type: Thoroughbred - Flat racing

Race information
- Distance: 1 1/8 miles (9 furlongs)
- Surface: Turf
- Track: Left-handed
- Qualification: Three-years-old & up
- Weight: Assigned

The John Henry Handicap was an American Thoroughbred horse race held annually at Hollywood Park Racetrack in Inglewood, California from 1986 through 1994. A Grade II event open to horses age three and older, it was contest on turf over a distance of one and one eighth miles (9 furlongs).

Inaugurated in 1986, it was named in honor of U.S. Racing Hall of Fame inductee John Henry, a four-time U.S. Champion Male Turf Horse and two-time U. S. Horse of the Year.

== Records ==
Speed record:

- 1:45.00 - Leger Cat (1993)

Most wins:

- No horse won this race more than once.

Most wins by an owner:

- No owner won this race more than once.

Most wins by a jockey:

- 2 - Bill Shoemaker (1986, 1989)
- 2 - Eddie Delahoussaye (1988, 1994)
- 2 - Corey Nakatani (1991, 1993)

Most wins by a trainer:

- 3 - Charles E. Whittingham (1986, 1989, 1990)

== Winners ==
| Year | Winner | Age | Jockey | Trainer | Owner | Time |
|---|---|---|---|---|---|---|
| 1994 | Arcangues | 6 | Eddie Delahoussaye | Richard E. Mandella | Daniel Wildenstein | 1:47.20 |
| 1993 | Leger Cat | 7 | Corey Nakatani | Richard E. Mandella | E. C. Allred & R. D. Hubbard | 1:45.00 |
| 1992 | Notorious Pleasure | 6 | Russell Baze | Gary F. Jones | Robert Levy et al. | 1:45.60 |
| 1991 | Pharisien | 4 | Corey Nakatani | Christian Doumen | Jean Andreani | 1:46.80 |
| 1990 | Golden Pheasant | 4 | Chris McCarron | Charles E. Whittingham | Bruce McNall & Wayne Gretzky | 1:47.00 |
| 1989 | Peace | 4 | Bill Shoemaker | Charles E. Whittingham | Tom Gentry | 1:46.20 |
| 1988 | Deputy Governor | 4 | Eddie Delahoussaye | Neil D. Drysdale | Universal Stable | 1:46.00 |
| 1987 | Al Mamoon | 6 | Pat Valenzuela | Robert J. Frankel | B. R. Firestone & E. A. Gann | 1:47.00 |
| 1986 | Palace Music | 5 | Bill Shoemaker | Charles E. Whittingham | N. B. Hunt & A. E. Paulson | 1:48.80 |
