= Soldier of Fortune (horse) =

Irish-bred Thoroughbred racehorse

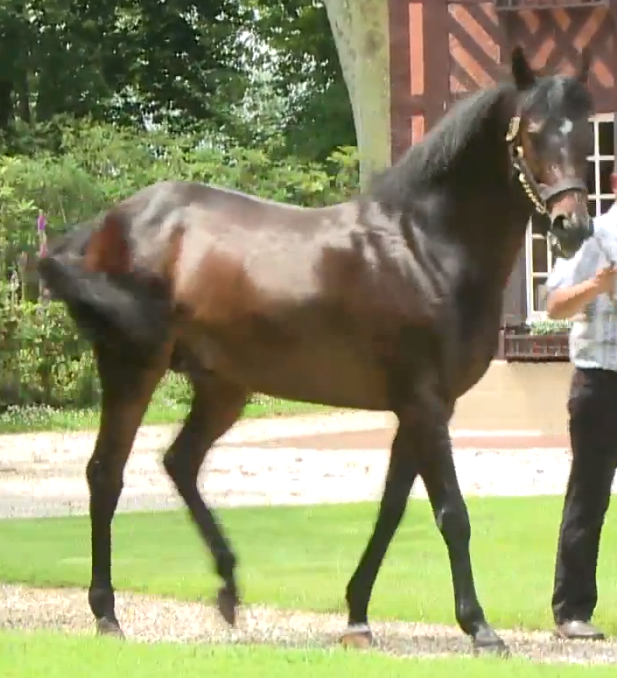
- Soldier of Fortune at Haras du Logis Saint-Germain in 2012.
- Sire: Galileo
- Grandsire: Sadler's Wells
- Dam: Affianced
- Damsire: Erins Isle
- Sex: Stallion
- Foaled: 2004
- Country: Ireland
- Colour: Bay
- Breeder: James S. Bolger
- Owner: Sue Magnier, Michael Tabor, Derrick Smith
- Trainer: Aidan O'Brien
- Record: 13: 6-3-1
- Earnings: £1,341,073

Major wins
- Prix Niel (2007); Prix Noailles (2007); Chester Vase (2007); Irish Derby Stakes (2007); Coronation Cup (2008)

Soldier of Fortune (foaled February 20, 2004 in Ireland) is a Thoroughbred racehorse who won the 2007 Group One Irish Derby Stakes as well as important races in France, and who in 2008 won the Group One Coronation Cup.

Soldier of Fortune was sired by Galileo who also sired New Approach, Epsom Derby winner in 2008, Lush Lashes, Coronation Stakes winner in 2008, and Red Rocks, Breeders' Cup Turf winner in 2006.

In 2007, Soldier of Fortune won the Irish Derby, beating Epsom Derby winner Authorized. He later ran in the Prix de l'Arc de Triomphe, finishing fifth behind stablemate Dylan Thomas. In 2008, he won the Coronation Cup beating Macarthur and Get Away. He finished third in a dead heat with Its Gino in the Prix de l'Arc de Triomphe, and in his final race of the year, Soldier of Fortune ran fourth to winner Conduit in the Breeders' Cup Turf at Santa Anita Park in California.
