= Bay Meadows Derby =

The Bay Meadows Derby was an American Thoroughbred horse race for three-year-old horses of either gender on the Longden Turf Course at Bay Meadows Racetrack. Bay Meadows was in San Mateo, California.

The Bay Meadows Derby first ran in 1954 on the dirt. That year's winner of the Kentucky Derby won the first Bay Meadows Derby, the California-bred Determine. In 1957, Round Table (horse) won the race, the first of many as a three-year-old.

The Derby, revived in 1978 at one and one/sixteenth mile, is a Grade III grass event set at one and one/eighth mile, and offers a purse of $100,000.

Bay Meadows Racetrack closed in 2008. There were ten final race dates run in August 2008 for the San Mateo County Fair, with the last official race occurring on August 17, 2008.

== Past winners ==
- 2007 - Unusual Suspect (Kyle Kaenel)
- 2006 - Proudinsky (Ger.) (Patrick Valenzuela)
- 2005 - Race Not Run
- 2004 - Congressionalhonor (Russell Baze)
- 2003 - Stanley Park (Eric Saint-Martin)
- 2002 - Royal Gem (Russell Baze)
- 2001 - Blue Stellar
- 2000 - Walkslikeaduck (Eddie Delahoussaye)
- 1999 - Mula Gula (Rafael Meza)
- 1998 - Takarian
- 1997 - Shellbacks
- 1996 - Ocean Queen
- 1995 - Virginia Carnival
- 1994 - Marvins Faith
- 1993 - Ranger
- 1992 - Star Recruit
- 1991 - Bistro Garden
- 1990 - Sekondi
- 1989 - Irish
- 1988 - Coax Me Clyde
- 1987 - Hot and Smoggy
- 1986 - Le Belvedere
- 1985 - Minutes Away
- 1984 - Mangaki
- 1983 - Interco
- 1982 - Ask Me
- 1981 - Silveyville
- 1980 - Fleet Tempo (Roberto Gonzalez)
- 1979 - Nain Bleu
- 1978 - Quip
- Race Not Run
- 1957 - Round Table
- 1954 - Determine
