= Haskell Ross =

American racehorse trainer (1908–1966)

Hack Ross
Personal information
- Born: March 28, 1908 Garland, Texas
- Died: December 9, 1966 (aged 58)
- Resting place: Cottonwood Cemetery, Dallas, Texas

Horse racing career
- Sport: Horse racing

Major racing wins
- San Jose Handicap (1943); Memorial Day Handicap (1944); American Handicap (1945); Oakland Handicap (1945); Bing Crosby Stakes (1946); La Jolla Handicap (1946); Walter Connolly Handicap (1947); Berkeley Handicap (1950); Del Mar Futurity (1951); Golden Gate Handicap (1952); Golden Gate Mile (1952); Playa Del Rey Stakes (1953); Sunset Handicap (1953); Garden State Stakes (1959); Champagne Stakes (1959); Charles S. Howard Stakes (1959); Cowdin Stakes (1959)

Honors
- Southern Methodist University Football Letterwinners Plaza; Hack Ross Avenue, San Mateo, California

Significant horses
- Bull Reigh, Lights Up, Warfare

Haskell Eugene "Hack" Ross (March 28, 1908 – December 9, 1966) was an American trainer of Thoroughbred racehorses based in California who race-conditioned the colt Warfare to National Championship honors in 1959. Hack Ross Avenue, near the site where the defunct Bay Meadows Racetrack once stood in San Mateo, California, is named in his honor.

Prior to his career in horse racing, Ross had been a student at Southern Methodist University in Dallas, Texas, where he had been a fullback and letterman with the SMU Mustangs.
