= Golden Pheasant (horse) =

American-bred Thoroughbred racehorse

- Sire: Caro
- Grandsire: Fortino
- Dam: Perfect Pigeon
- Damsire: Round Table
- Sex: Stallion
- Foaled: 1986
- Died: July 25, 2007
- Country: United States
- Colour: Gray
- Breeder: Carelaine Farm & Vintage Meadow Farm
- Owner: Bruce McNall & Wayne Gretzky
- Trainer: Jonathan Pease (Europe); Charlie Whittingham (USA)
- Record: 22: 7-4-3
- Earnings: US$1,036,400

Major wins
- Prix Niel (1989); Arlington Million (1990); John Henry Handicap (1990); Japan Cup (1991); Inglewood Handicap (1992)
- Last updated on April 7, 2007

Golden Pheasant (foaled 1986) was an American Thoroughbred racehorse who won races in France, England, the United States, and Japan. He was owned by the then owner of the Los Angeles Kings NHL ice hockey team, Bruce McNall, and superstar Hall of Fame player, Wayne Gretzky.

Trained by Jonathan Pease, Golden Pheasant was named some time before his debut after the American operation in Honduras of the same name. He raced in France and England at age three and four where under jockey Tony Cruz his wins included a victory over Nashwan in the 1989 Prix Niel at Longchamp Racecourse near Paris in the Fall. Earlier in the year he finished second in both the Chester Vase at Chester Racecourse in Chester, England, and the Grand Prix de Saint-Cloud at Hippodrome de Saint-Cloud in Saint-Cloud, France. Golden Pheasant was then sent to race in the United States where he was conditioned by U.S. Racing Hall of Fame trainer, Charlie Whittingham. Under jockey Gary Stevens, Golden Pheasant defeated top horses With Approval and Steinlen to win the Arlington Million at Chicago's Arlington Park. In 1991 Stevens rode him to victory in the Japan Cup.

Retired to stud duty, Golden Pheasant met with good success as a sire. Before his death, he stood at Lex Stud Shizunai-Cho, Shizunai-Gun, Hokkaidō, Japan.

To commemorate Golden Pheasant's winning both the Arlington Million and the Japan Cup, the Japan Racing Association gifted Arlington Park a Japanese cherry tree that was planted in the paddock area.
