= Charles H. Strub =

American dentist and entrepreneur

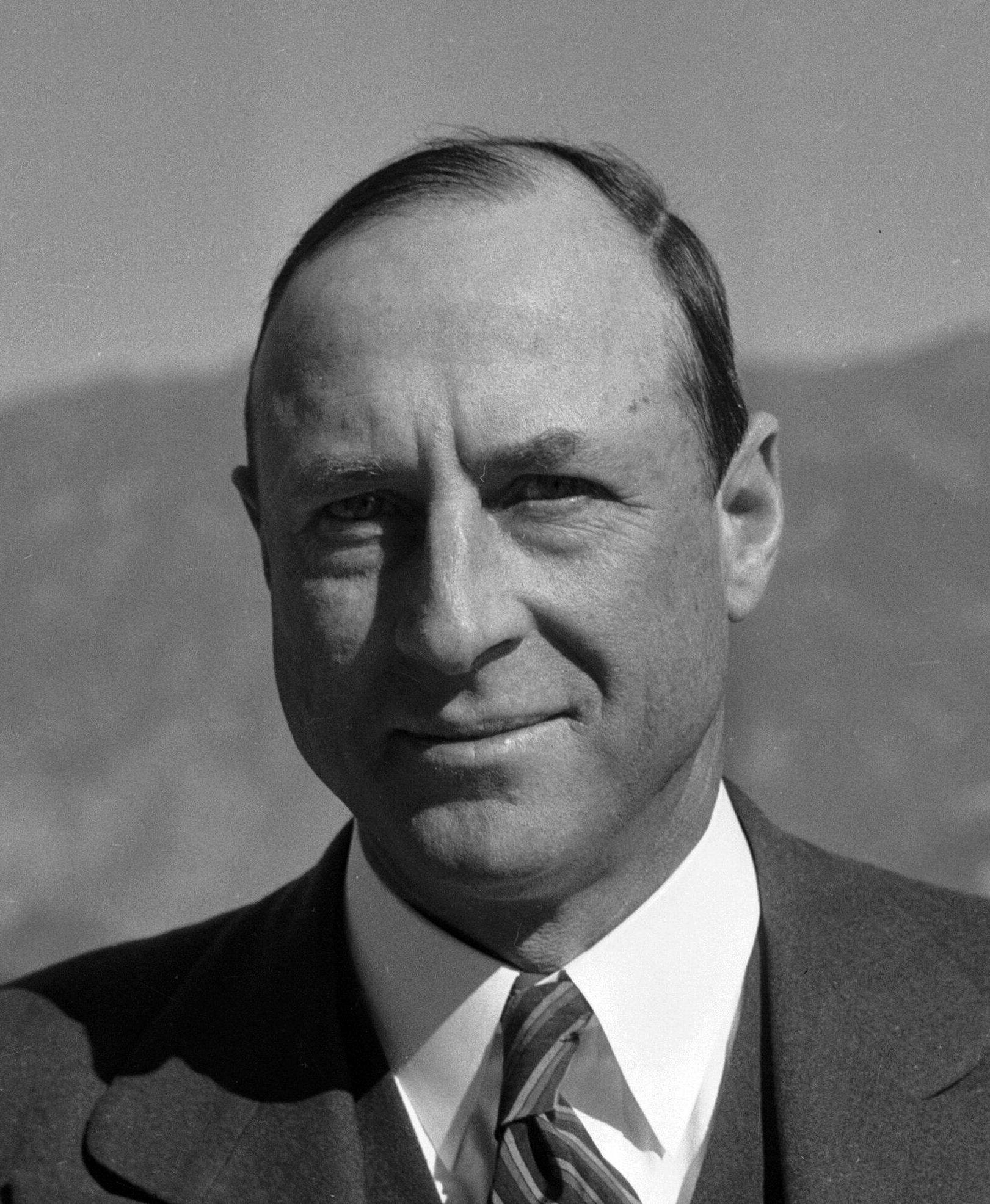
Strub in 1934

Charles Henry "Doc" Strub (November 3, 1884 – March 28, 1958) was an American dentist and entrepreneur who built and owned Santa Anita Park racetrack in Arcadia, California, and was president and partner of the San Francisco Seals baseball club of the Pacific Coast League.

== Early life ==
Charles Strub was born in Hollister, California, as the only child of Isadore Strub and Rebecca Williamson Strub. At a young age, he moved to San Francisco, where he attended St. Ignatius College Preparatory. He enrolled at Santa Clara University and played baseball under future business partner Charlie Graham. He was a teammate of future New York Yankees star Hal Chase. Having been put through agony as a child by the dentists of the day, he decided to study dentistry. Since Santa Clara didn't offer a dentistry program, he transferred to the University of California at Berkeley to obtain his degree and where he also played on the varsity baseball team. At Berkeley, he studied modern techniques with new pain-killing drugs and laughing gas so that pulling an abscessed tooth could be done painlessly—a great benefit to society, he thought. Upon graduation, Charlie invested in state-of-the-art equipment which was destroyed in the 1906 earthquake before he saw his first patient. In the weeks following the disaster, he saw a column in the newspaper that said his baseball coach from Santa Clara, Charlie Graham, was looking for him to play some ball. During 1906 and 1907 he played baseball with the San Francisco team in the California State League but made his living as a dentist. Entrepreneurial focused, he was known as the "advertising dentist" and eventually had a chain of six "painless extraction" dentist parlors. His chain of dentist offices provided him the opportunity to speculate in the burgeoning California real estate market, financing much of the rebuilding of the SF Business district after the earthquake, making Doc Strub a very wealthy man. One of the San Francisco buildings he built was 450 Sutter, which still houses medical professionals.

== San Francisco Seals ==
In 1918, the financially strapped owner of the San Francisco Seals put the baseball team up for sale. George Alfred (Alfie) Putnam and Charles H. Graham were looking to acquire the club, but lacked the necessary funds. After passing one of Strub's dentist offices, they sought out and brought the "Doc" in as an equal partner. Appointed team president, he successfully led the San Francisco Seals for more than two decades. In 1931, he oversaw construction of Seals Stadium. As president of the Seals, he sold minor league ball players to the majors at unheard of prices. By the mid-1920s, the Seals had collected an estimated $500,000 in fees from these transactions and had earned the trio the title "Murder, Mayhem and Manslaughter, Incorporated" from Chicago Cubs Scout Jack Doyle. After first trying to sell Joe Dimaggio to the Chicago Cubs, he eventually negotiated a deal with the New York Yankees for $25,000 on a money-back guarantee. Doc Strub always regretted that he was able to get more for Joe's brother Dom than he got for Joe. He quipped, "Of course I never dreamed he'd become the husband of Marilyn Monroe."

In 1929, Strub was sitting in his lucky barber chair getting a shave when he was handed the phone. On it was the president of Bank of America who told him that he lost everything and was more than 1 million in debt. When Strub asked about repaying it, the response from the president of Bank of America was "Don't worry Charlie, I know you're good for it." Not a believer in bankruptcy, Doc Strub paid back all of his debt including that of his other Seals partners. He maintained a list of those he owed money on an index card that he constantly kept with him in his jacket pocket.

== Santa Anita Park ==
A fan of thoroughbred horse racing, he decided to enter the business when California passed a parimutuel wagering bill in the early 1930s. He had spent several months examining locations in the San Francisco Area and found none of them to his liking, including windy Candlestick Point. He then connected with a group in Los Angeles that had identified 'Lucky' Baldwin's Rancho Santa Anita as a location, but needed increased financial backing. In January 1934 Charles Strub, in partnership with Hollywood filmmaker Hal Roach and a group of investors, formed the Los Angeles Turf Club. Created for the purpose of building the first race track in California, they opened Santa Anita Park in Arcadia on Christmas Day, 1934. He introduced a number of significant innovations to American racing. The innovations he instituted for all races included finish line cameras to verify race results, electronic timing, and electronic starting gates. The improvements were later adopted by the rest of racing industry.

Although the country was in the throes of the Great Depression, Strub's management and creativity brought success to his investors. He attracted Seabiscuit to the track, which helped to establish Santa Anita as a premier stop on the racing circuit. The first year dividend returned to investors 100% of their initial investment. By 1960, the aggregate par value of the stock ($7,500,000) had multiplied over a dozen times and grown so large that it split 375 to one. After its opening, Santa Anita made Dr. Strub one of the highest paid executives in the country, landing on the Treasury Department list of highest executives from 1936 through 1941. In 1946, he ranked number four on the list, earning $396,901. As time progressed, Doc Strub used Santa Anita as a vehicle for other leisure-time investments including Lake Arrowhead and Pacific Ocean Park.

In 1987, he was inducted into California Thoroughbred Racing Hall of Fame's inaugural class.

In 2018, he was inducted into the National Racing Hall of Fame in Saratoga Springs, NY

=== Strub Series ===
Santa Anita Park honored him by renaming the Santa Anita Maturity Stakes the Charles H. Strub Stakes. The Strub Stakes is the final leg of the Strub Series of three open races for newly turned 4-year-old horses held over several weeks during the first two months of each year. The Series consists of the Malibu Stakes, raced at 7 furlongs, the San Fernando Stakes, at 1 1/16 miles, and the Strub Stakes.

Only five horses have ever won all three legs of the Strub Series: Round Table (1958), Hillsdale (1959), Ancient Title (1974), Spectacular Bid (1980) and Precisionist (1985).

== Other endeavors ==
In 1939, he was asked to help bail out the 1939 San Francisco World's Fair. It was a task he accepted at no salary. His efforts turned the fair around and into a break-even event for its organizers.

When he was opening Santa Anita, Strub still had his interest and position with the San Francisco Seals baseball team. While in New York City, prior to the track's official opening, he sought out a meeting with Baseball Commissioner Judge Landis to talk about the apparent conflict of gambling and baseball. When he entered the commissioner's office, Judge Landis asked "Why are you here?", to which Dr Strub explained his concerns about the conflict and the need for him to exit baseball. Judge Landis replied, "Charlie, if I wanted you out of baseball I would have sent for you." Judge Landis' comment effectively ended the conversation. In 1945, the estate of Jacob Ruppert was selling the NY Yankees and Doc Strub put in a bid. However, at this point, the baseball commissioner was Happy Chandler and he was concerned about the public appearance of having an owner who was also involved in gambling - albeit legitimate para-mutual horse racing. Strub withdrew his bid.

He was appointed to the board of several civic organizations, including the Greater Los Angeles Opera Association and New York's Metropolitan Opera. As a benefactor, the Charles H. Strub Memorial Theater at Loyola Marymount University and Strub Hall at Santa Clara University (part of the Charles H. Graham residential complex) are named in his honor. He brought and donated to the Society of the Holy Child Jesus, the Bellefontaine estate which is now the Mayfield Senior School property in Pasadena, California. In conjunction with Santa Anita, he donated the 160-acre (0.65 km^{2}) Forest Lawn Scout Reservation to the Los Angeles Area Council of the Boy Scouts of America.

Strub died of a cerebral thrombosis in 1958 in Los Angeles. He was the nephew of Rev. Joseph Strub, founder of Duquesne University in Pittsburgh, Pennsylvania.

He married Vera Wood (1896–1968) and had five children. His son Robert P. Strub later became chairman of Santa Anita.

In the movie Seabiscuit he is portrayed by Ed Lauter.
