= Imbros (horse) =

American-bred Thoroughbred racehorse

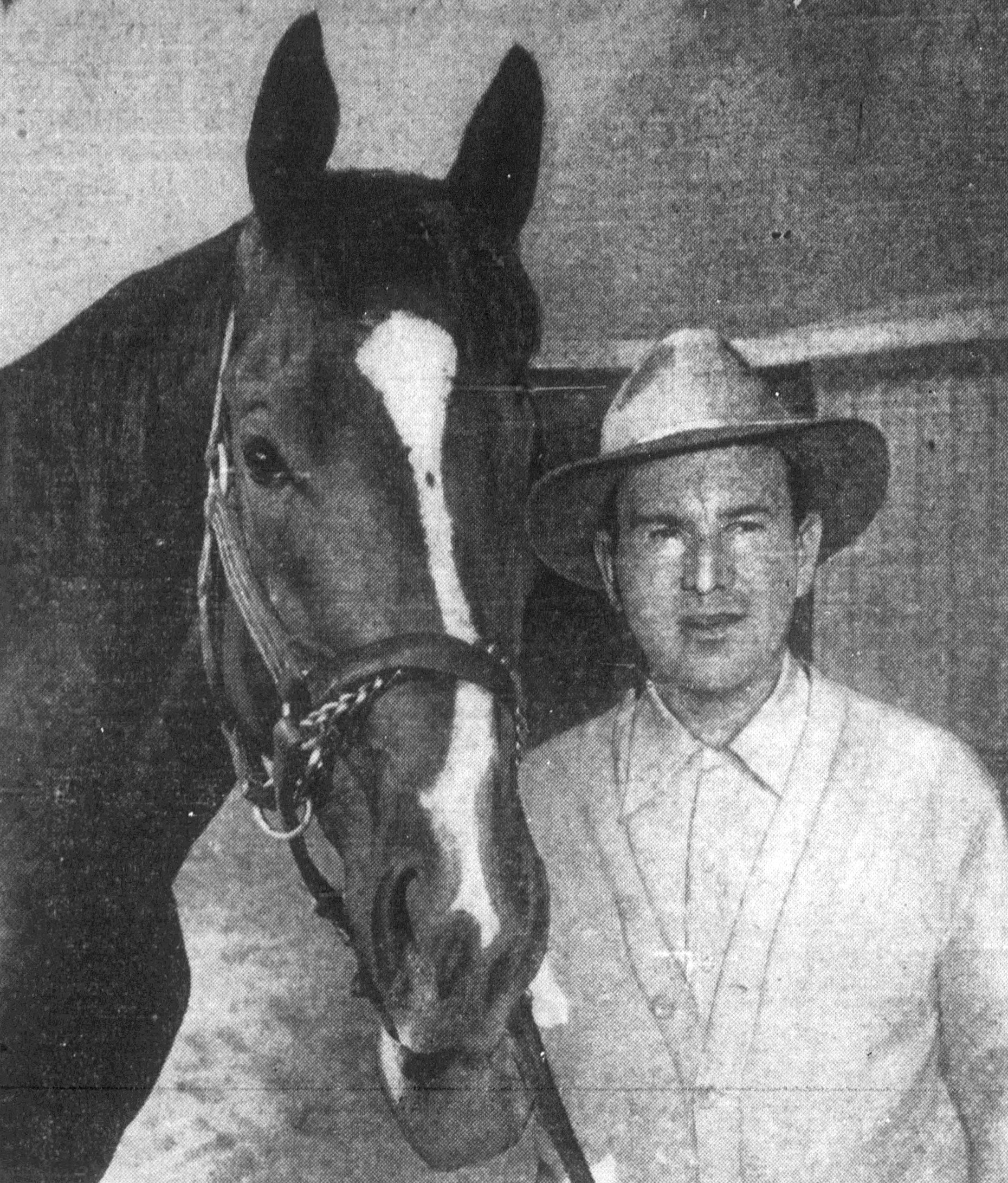
- Imbros with trainer Bill Molter
- Sire: Polynesian
- Grandsire: Unbreakable
- Dam: Fire Falls
- Damsire: Bull Dog
- Sex: Stallion
- Foaled: 1950
- Country: United States
- Colour: Chestnut
- Breeder: Woodvale Farm
- Owner: Andrew J. Crevolin
- Trainer: William Molter
- Record: 36: 15-7-7
- Earnings: US$340,550

Major wins
- Debonair Stakes (1953); Will Rogers Stakes (1953); El Dorado Handicap (1953); San Jose Handicap (1953); Californian Stakes (1954); William P. Kyne Handicap (1954); Malibu Sequet Stakes (1954); Lincoln's Birthday Handicap (1954); Governor Goodwin J. Knight Handicap (1954); Palos Verdes Handicap (1954); Pacific Handicap (1954)
- Last updated on January 18, 1953

Imbros (1950–1972) was an American Thoroughbred racehorse who set or equaled six track records including a new world record for seven furlongs in winning the 1954 Malibu Sequet Stakes at Santa Anita Park and equaled the world record for a mile and a sixteenth in winning the 1954 Californian Stakes at Hollywood Park Racetrack.

== Background ==
Bred in Kentucky by Royce G. Martin's Woodvale Farm, his sire was Polynesian who also sired U.S. Racing Hall of Fame inductee, Native Dancer. His dam, Fire Falls, was a daughter of Bull Dog who was the leading sire in North America in 1943 and a three-time Leading broodmare sire in North America. Imbros was purchased by California businessman Andrew Crevolin at the Keeneland Summer Sale of yearlings and named for the Turkish island of Imbros in the Aegean Sea. He was trained by Bill Molter in California.

== Racing career ==
At age three, Imbros won four stakes races, including the 1953 Will Rogers Stakes at Hollywood Park Racetrack. At age four, he set a world record for seven furlongs in winning the 1954 Malibu Sequet Stakes at Santa Anita Park and equalled the world record for 8 1/2 furlongs in winning the Californian Stakes at Hollywood Park. On April 24, 1954, Johnny Longden rode him to a Bay Meadows track record for one mile in winning the Governor Goodwin J. Knight Handicap. One week later on May 1 at the same track, Imbros set another track record of 1 1/8 miles (1.8 km) while capturing the William P. Kyne Handicap, the first $100,000 stakes race at Bay Meadows Racetrack. As well, Imbros twice equaled the Santa Anita Park track record for six furlongs and finished second in the Premiere, Santa Anita, and Lakes And Flowers Handicaps.

Imbros raced at age five with his best results being runner-up finishes in the San Antonio and San Carlos Handicaps.

== Stud record ==
In July 1955 it was announced that California breeder Charles H. Jones had purchased Imbros for breeding purposes. . As a stallion, Imbros most notably sired U.S. Racing Hall of Fame inductee, Native Diver who set six career track records at distances from six to nine furlongs.
