= Determine =

American-bred Thoroughbred racehorse

- Sire: Alibhai
- Grandsire: Hyperion
- Dam: Koubis
- Damsire: Mahmoud
- Sex: Stallion
- Foaled: 1951
- Country: United States
- Colour: Gray
- Breeder: Dr. Eslie Asbury
- Owner: Andrew J. Crevolin
- Trainer: William Molter
- Record: 44: 18-7-9
- Earnings: US$573,360

Major wins
- San Franciscan Handicap (1953); Robert O'Brien Handicap (1953); Santa Anita Derby (1954); Bay Meadows Derby (1954); Golden Gate Handicap (1954); Debonair Stakes (1954); San Felipe Handicap (1954); San Gabriel Handicap (1954); San Jose Handicap (1954); Oakland Handicap (1954); Peter Clark Handicap (1954); Santa Anita Maturity (1955); Golden Gate Mile Handicap (1955); Malibu Sequet Stakes (1955); Inglewood Handicap (1955) American Classic Race wins: Kentucky Derby (1954)
- Last updated on September 9, 2008

Determine (April 7, 1951 – September 27, 1972) was an American Thoroughbred racehorse. In a racing career from 1953 through 1955, the California-trained colt ran forty-four times and won eighteen races. His best season was 1954 when he became the first gray horse to win the Kentucky Derby.

== Background ==
Determine was sired by the British stallion Alibhai, a son of the 1933 Epsom Derby and St. Leger Stakes winner Hyperion. Alibhai's other progeny included Your Host and Flower Bowl. Determine's dam was Koubis, born with a cleft palate. Her breeder, Dr. Eslie Asbury, used specially designed instruments to repair her palate in a unique operation, but she was never raced. Koubis was a granddaughter of the mare Swing On, the dam of Seabiscuit, and was also related to Equipoise and Intentionally.

Bred to Alibhai, Koubis produced a colt so small that the man who bought him for $12,000, a California automobile dealer named Andrew J. Crevolin, said he "…must have been standing in a hole when he inspected the colt." His breeder offered to take him back, but Crevolin refused, explaining that he might let a Kentucky Derby winner get away. The colt was sent into training with William Molter in California.

Determine, a soft gray in color, grew to a little over fifteen hands and never weighed more than 900 pounds. At the time of his Derby win, he was described in the press as being a "pint-sized colt" and "a little package of dynamite."

== Racing career ==
In his two-year-old season Determine won prize money which totaled more than double his purchase price. Overall, it was a modest year, but when he turned three, with no break in training from the year before, Determine was always in stakes company and was never out of the money. In more than one race, his small size got him through holes, and his light weight made him nimble in cramped situations.

After Determine won the Santa Anita Derby as well as a few other important West Coast stakes races, Crevolin wanted to send him to Kentucky for the Derby. But his trainer, Wille Molter, with a large stable to manage, was reluctant to take the risk, believing that the race was too hard on a young horse so early in the year. Trainer and owner went back and forth over this decision until Determine made it for them by winning more races. He was flown to Kentucky, and in the space of four days ran in two races. On April 27, 1954, he competed in the Derby Trial, running side by side with Hasty Road in the stretch. Determine matched the much larger Hasty Road stride for stride, although Hasty Road won by a head in a new track record time of 1:35 for the mile. The show horse was eleven lengths back.

On May 1, Determine, who had been flown in from California shortly before the race, was ridden by Ray York in the 1954 Kentucky Derby. He was the second choice of the 100,000 crowd at odds of 4/1 with Correlation, another Californian colt, starting the 3/1 favourite. Right out of the gate, York was almost unseated. Timely Tip, who had won the Arkansas Derby, cut over badly from the outside. In what Churchill Downs describes as one of the roughest Derbys ever run, Determine stayed on his feet, and York remained in the saddle. Hasty Road was well in the lead but Determine caught him 1/16 of a mile from the finish and won by a length and a half, becoming the first gray to win the Derby. As the colt had never been entered in the Belmont Stakes, there was no hope of completing the Triple Crown, and shortly after the Derby, it was announced that Determine would miss the Preakness Stakes, which was won in his absence by Hasty Road. Molter had explained that, as Determine was a late foal and had already run nine times in 1954, he did not want to risk over-racing him.

Back in California, Determine was sent out against older horses. Losing a few races, he was found to have an abscessed jaw and was taken out of training. When he came back, he was heavily weighted, which took its toll on him. Even so, he won four stakes races and retired with winnings of $573,360.

== Stud record ==
Determine sired Decidedly, winner of the 1962 Kentucky Derby, and Warfare, whose dam was War Whisk. Determine was also the damsire of Hall of Fame filly Bold ’n Determined.

Determine died in September 1972 and is buried at Rancho Jonata, Buellton, California.

== Sire line tree ==
- Determine
  - Warfare
    - Assagai
      - Big Whippendeal
      - Almost Grown
  - Decidedly
    - Tinajero
    - Wardlaw
      - Florida Law
  - Donut King

== Pedigree ==
Pedigree of Determine (USA), gray stallion 1951
Sire Alibhai ch. 1938	Hyperion ch. 1930	Gainsborough*	Bayardo*
Sire Alibhai ch. 1938	Hyperion ch. 1930	Gainsborough*	Rosedrop*
Sire Alibhai ch. 1938	Hyperion ch. 1930	Selene	Chaucer
Sire Alibhai ch. 1938	Hyperion ch. 1930	Selene	Serenissima
Sire Alibhai ch. 1938	Teresina ch. 1920	Tracery	Rock Sand
Sire Alibhai ch. 1938	Teresina ch. 1920	Tracery	Topiary
Sire Alibhai ch. 1938	Teresina ch. 1920	Blue Tit	Wildfowler
Sire Alibhai ch. 1938	Teresina ch. 1920	Blue Tit	Petit Bleu
Dam Koubis gr. 1946	Mahmoud gr. 1933	Blenheim	Blandford
Dam Koubis gr. 1946	Mahmoud gr. 1933	Blenheim	Malva
Dam Koubis gr. 1946	Mahmoud gr. 1933	Mah Mahal	Gainsborough*
Dam Koubis gr. 1946	Mahmoud gr. 1933	Mah Mahal	Mumtaz Mahal
Dam Koubis gr. 1946	Brown Biscuit br. 1936	Sir Andrew	Sir Gallahad III
Dam Koubis gr. 1946	Brown Biscuit br. 1936	Sir Andrew	Gravitate
Dam Koubis gr. 1946	Brown Biscuit br. 1936	Swing On	Whisk Broom II
Dam Koubis gr. 1946	Brown Biscuit br. 1936	Swing On	Balance (Family: 5-j)

* Determine is inbred 3S x 4D to the stallion Gainsborough, meaning that he appears third generation on the sire side of his pedigree, and fourth generation on the dam side of his pedigree.
