= William Molter =

American horse trainer

Personal information
- Born: June 2, 1910 Fredericksburg, Texas, U.S.
- Died: April 2, 1960 (aged 49) Monrovia, California, U.S.
- Occupation: Jockey/Trainer

Horse racing career
- Sport: Horse racing
- Career wins: 2,158

Major racing wins
- As a jockey: Manitoba Stakes (1935) As a trainer: San Diego Handicap (1945); Santa Anita Derby (1947, 1954); Santa Maria Handicap (1947); Argonaut Handicap (1948, 1958); Bing Crosby Handicap (1948); Hollywood Derby (1948, 1949); Hollywood Gold Cup (1948, 1957); Hollywood Lassie Stakes (1948, 1956); Santa Catalina Handicap (1948); Del Mar Handicap (1949); Inglewood Handicap (1949, 1955); Santa Anita Maturity (1949, 1955, 1958); Sunset Handicap (1949); San Felipe Stakes (1953, 1954, 1957); San Gabriel Handicap (1953, 1954, 1958); Californian Stakes (1954); Malibu Stakes (1954, 1955, 1957); Carter Handicap (1955); Golden Gate Mile Handicap (1955); Paumonok Handicap (1955); Santa Anita Handicap (1956, 1958); San Juan Capistrano Handicap (1956); San Marcos Stakes (1956, 1957, 1959); Santa Margarita Handicap (1956, 1957); American Derby (1957); Blue Grass Stakes (1957); Cinema Handicap (1957); Hawthorne Gold Cup Handicap (1957, 1958); United Nations Stakes (1957, 1959); Agua Caliente Handicap (1958); Arlington Handicap (1958, 1959); Gulfstream Park Handicap (1958); Stars and Stripes Turf Handicap (1958); San Antonio Handicap (1958); San Fernando Stakes (1958); San Luis Obispo Handicap (1958); Arlington Futurity Stakes (1959); Manhattan Handicap (1959); Washington Park Handicap (1959); California Derby (1960) American Classic Race wins: Kentucky Derby (1954)

Racing awards
- U.S. National Champion Trainer by wins (1946, 1947, 1948, 1949); U.S. National Champion trainer by earnings (1954, 1956, 1958, 1959)

Honours
- United States' Racing Hall of Fame (1960)

Significant horses
- Ace Admiral, Bobby Brocato, Determine, Imbros, On Trust, Round Table, Shannon, T.V. Lark

William Molter (June 2, 1910 – April 2, 1960) was an American National Champion and Hall of Fame horse trainer in the sport of Thoroughbred racing.

A native of Fredericksburg, Texas, Molter began his career in horse racing as a jockey at racetracks across the Texas border in Mexico. He eventually made his way to the bush tracks of Western Canada and at the modern Polo Park Racetrack in Winnipeg, Manitoba won the 1935 edition of the Manitoba Stakes, now known as the Canadian Derby. That year he turned to training horses, making his way to the modern new racetracks being built in California where he enjoyed considerable success. He was the United States Champion Thoroughbred Trainer by wins four straight years between 1946 and 1949, and led all American trainers in earnings four times, winning the title in 1954, 1956, 1958, and 1959.

During his career, Molter trained for prominent owners such as Elizabeth Arden, Andrew J. Crevolin, Travis M. Kerr, and film mogul, Louis B. Mayer. Among the horses Molter trained were 1947 Santa Anita Derby winner, On Trust, 1956 Santa Anita Handicap winner Bobby Brocato, and Imbros, who set a new world record of 1:20.60 for 7 furlongs in winning the 1954 Malibu Sequet Stakes. In addition, Molter won the 1954 Kentucky Derby with Determine but his most famous horse was 1958 American Horse of the Year and Hall of Fame inductee, Round Table who retired at the end of the 1959 racing season having earned a world record US$1,749,869.

Molter died on April 2, 1960, of a massive cerebral stroke. That year, the United States' National Museum of Racing inducted him in their Hall of Fame.
