= John H. Adams (jockey) =

American jockey

John Adams
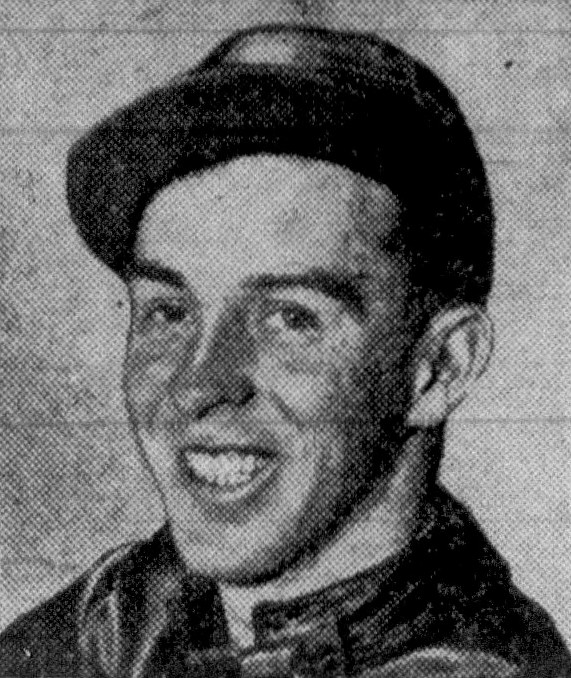
- Adams, circa 1941

Personal information
- Born: September 1, 1914 Carlisle, Arkansas, United States
- Died: August 19, 1995 (aged 80)
- Occupation: Jockey / Trainer

Horse racing career
- Sport: Horse racing
- Career wins: 3,270 (jockey)

Major racing wins
- Hollywood Derby (1938, 1939); San Pasqual Handicap (1938); Santa Anita Handicap (1939, 1946); San Carlos Handicap (1939); San Felipe Stakes (1939); American Derby (1940); Arlington-Washington Futurity (1940); San Juan Capistrano Handicap (1940, 1949); Kentucky Oaks (1942, 1944); Ben Ali Stakes (1943, 1944, 1954); Phoenix Stakes (1943, 1954, 1955); Clark Handicap (1944); Arlington-Washington Lassie Stakes (1945, 1953); Coaching Club American Oaks (1945, 1947); Jamaica Handicap (1945); Fashion Stakes (1945); Juvenile Stakes (1945); Modesty Handicap (1945, 1956); Excelsior Handicap (1946); Hopeful Stakes (1947); Saratoga Cup (1947); Hollywood Gold Cup (1948); Santa Anita Oaks (1951); Lane's End Breeders' Futurity (1953); Black-Eyed Susan Stakes (1954); Arlington Handicap (1955) American Classic Race wins: Preakness Stakes (1954) As a trainer: San Miguel Stakes (1960); Santa Monica Handicap (1961); San Pasqual Handicap (1961); Hollywood Derby (1962); San Luis Rey Handicap (1962, 1967); Santa Catalina Handicap (1962); Del Mar Derby (1963, 1976, 1979); San Juan Capistrano Handicap (1967, 1968); San Simeon Handicap (1969); Beverly Hills Handicap (1972); Del Mar Handicap (1972); San Marcos Stakes (1972); San Francisco Mile Handicap (1978)

Racing awards
- United States Champion Jockey by wins (1937, 1942, 1943); George Woolf Memorial Jockey Award (1956)

Honours
- Kansas Sports Hall of Fame (1961); United States' Racing Hall of Fame (1965)

Significant horses
- Kayak II, Hasty Road, Shannon, J.O. Tobin, Jumping Hill, New Policy
- Updated on May 26, 2007

John H. Adams (September 1, 1914 – August 19, 1995) was an American National Champion Thoroughbred racing jockey who was inducted into the National Museum of Racing and Hall of Fame in 1965.

== Early life ==
Born in Carlisle, Arkansas, John Adams was nicknamed the "Iola Mite" for his boyhood home in Iola, Kansas. He got his first ride at a county fair where his father was delivering feed for the horses and other livestock. His parents didn't want him to become a jockey and refused to sign the necessary papers for an apprenticeship, so Adams misrepresented his age and became a journeyman immediately.

== Jockey ==
John Adams began his professional riding career at Riverside Park Racetrack in Kansas City. He went on to become a leading jockey beginning in the mid-1930s, with 43 percent of his mounts finishing in the top three over a 24-year period ending in 1958, when he retired due to a back injury. During his career, he rode a number of winners for prominent owners such as Maine Chance Farm and Hasty House Farm. On the horses he considered the two best he ever rode, he won the 1939 Santa Anita Handicap with Kayak II and the 1954 Preakness Stakes with Hasty Road. Adams rode six winners at Bay Meadows Racetrack on April 7, 1938.

== Trainer ==
Upon retirement, Adams became a thoroughbred trainer. His first winner was ridden by his son, John R. Adams. His best known victory as a trainer occurred with J.O. Tobin's 1977 upset over Seattle Slew in the Swaps Stakes at Hollywood Park Racetrack.

Adams was the nation's leading rider in winning mounts in 1937, 1942, and 1943. In 1956 he was honored with the George Woolf Memorial Jockey Award, which is given by the Jockeys' Guild annually to the thoroughbred horse racing jockey in North America who demonstrates high standards of personal and professional conduct, on and off the racetrack.

== Riding career ==
- Years Active: 1935–1958
- Number of Mounts: 20,159
- Number of Winners: 3,270
- Number of Place Finishes: 2,704
- Number of Show Finishes: 2,635
- Purses Earned: $9,743,109
- Winning Percentage: 16.2%
