= Jerry M. Fanning =

American horse trainer (born 1932)

Personal information
- Born: November 23, 1932 (age 93) Colorado Springs, Colorado, US
- Occupation: Trainer

Horse racing career
- Sport: Horse racing
- Career wins: 1,620

Major racing wins
- Santa Anita Derby (1970); Pomona Handicap (1976, 1977, 1981, 1982, 1983, 1985, 2008); Yerba Buena Handicap (1976); Breeders' Futurity Stakes (1977); Chula Vista Handicap (1979); Malibu Stakes (1979); Bing Crosby Handicap (1980, 1991); Hollywood Gold Cup (1984); San Diego Handicap (1984); Arlington Oaks (1986); Spinster Stakes (1986); Arlington Handicap (1990); La Brea Stakes (1990); El Encino Stakes (1990); San Luis Rey Handicap (1991)

Honors
- Fairplex Park Hall of Fame (2007)

Significant horses
- Desert Wine

Jerry M. Fanning (born November 23, 1932) is a retired American trainer of Thoroughbred racehorses. He grew up in Texas and began his career in horse racing as a groom for his father, trainer Lev Fanning. In 1958, he took out a trainer's license but waited until 1967 before becoming a full-time trainer.

Fanning's best horse was considered to be Desert Wine which won a number of important stake races and had solid second-place performances in the 1983 Kentucky Derby and Preakness Stakes. In 1984, Desert Wine won the Hollywood Gold Cup in which he beat John Henry.
