= Charles E. Whittingham =

American racehorse trainer (1913–1999)

Charlie Whittingham
- Biography cover

Personal information
- Born: April 13, 1913 Chula Vista, California, United States
- Died: April 20, 1999 (aged 86)
- Occupation: Trainer

Horse racing career
- Sport: Horse racing
- Career wins: 2,534

Major racing wins
- Santa Anita Handicap (1957, 1967, 1971, 1973, 1975, 1985, 1986, 1993); Hollywood Derby (1967, 1969, 1986, 1989); Hollywood Gold Cup (1971, 1972, 1973, 1974, 1978, 1982, 1985, 1987); Arlington Million (1982, 1986, 1990); Washington, D.C. International Stakes (1981); Santa Anita Derby (1987, 1989); Japan Cup (1991) American Classics / Breeders' Cup wins: Kentucky Derby (1986, 1989); Preakness Stakes (1989); Breeders' Cup Classic (1987, 1989)

Racing awards
- Eclipse Award for Outstanding Trainer (1971, 1982, 1989); U.S. Champion Trainer by earnings (1970, 1971, 1972, 1973, 1975, 1981, 1982)

Honours
- United States Racing Hall of Fame (1974); San Diego Hall of Champions (1993); Charles Whittingham bust and Whittingham Memorial Handicap at Santa Anita Park

Significant horses
- Ack Ack, Cougar II, Dahlia, Daryl's Joy, Estrapade, Exceller, Ferdinand, Flawlessly, Golden Pheasant, Goodbye Halo, Greinton, Kennedy Road, Perrault, Porterhouse, Pretense, Providential, Quack, Runaway Groom, Strawberry Road, Sunday Silence, Turkish Trousers

Charles Edward Whittingham (April 13, 1913 – April 20, 1999) was an American Thoroughbred race horse trainer who is one of the most acclaimed trainers in U.S. racing history.

== Early career ==
Born in Chula Vista, California, Whittingham began working around race horses at a young age and was eventually taken on as an assistant by Hall of Fame trainer Horatio Luro. During World War II, his career was interrupted by service with the United States Marine Corps. At war's end, he returned as an assistant trainer until 1950, when he set up his own stable to take on the training of horses for various owners. He got his big break when Liz Whitney Tippett hired him to condition her Llangollen Farm Stable racing stable. On June 10, 1953, the then forty-year-old Whittingham saddled his first stakes winner when Liz Person's Porterhouse won the National Stallion Stakes. The colt would go on to earn that year's U.S. Two-year-old colt honors.

== Records and champions ==
Over his 49 years as a head trainer, Whittingham had 252 stakes wins and became the all-time leading trainer at both Hollywood Park Racetrack and Santa Anita Park.

Whittingham trained several champions, including American Horse of the Year honorees Ack Ack, Ferdinand, and Sunday Silence. Among others, he trained Daryl's Joy, champion New Zealand two-year-old, winner in Australia wfa championship W S Cox Plate, Victoria Derby, Oak Tree International (USA), Cougar II, the 1972 U.S. Champion Turf Horse, Kennedy Road, the 1983 Canadian Horse of the Year, and for a time, Exceller. He also trained the champion daughter of Affirmed, Flawlessly. His horses were named Champion Female Turf Horse on four occasions. In 1986, at the age of 73, he became the oldest trainer to win the Kentucky Derby, then won the prestigious race again three years later. Both Derby-winning horses went on to win the Breeders' Cup Classic.

He continued to train horses right up to the time of his death at age 86.

== Honors ==
In 1974, Charlie Whittingham was inducted into the National Museum of Racing and Hall of Fame. In 1993, he was also inducted into the Breitbard Hall of Fame in the San Diego Hall of Champions. He won the Eclipse Award for Outstanding Trainer in the U.S. in 1971, 1982, and 1989 and U.S. Champion Trainer by earnings seven times: 1970 to 1973, 1975, 1981, and 1982.

Named in his honor is the Charles Whittingham Memorial Handicap, a Grade 1 stakes race that was held annually at Hollywood Park and moved to Santa Anita Park when Hollywood closed. A bust of Whittingham and his dog Toby is at the paddock at Santa Anita. Del Mar Race Track has the Whittingham Sports Pub with photos and sports memorabilia honoring Charles Whittingham, and Hollywood Park Racetrack has the Whittingham Pub and Deli.

== Selected other race wins ==
- Futurity Stakes (1953)
- Knickerbocker Handicap (1954)
- San Carlos Handicap (1955, 1956, 1960, 1971, 1988, 1993)
- Arlington Handicap (1956, 1983, 1987)
- Californian Stakes (1956, 1957, 1971, 1972, 1973, 1974, 1982, 1983, 1985, 1987, 1990)
- San Felipe Handicap (1956, 1963, 1966, 1989)
- Santa Barbara Handicap (1956, 1964, 1974, 1975, 1976, 1985, 1987)
- Woodward Stakes (1956)
- San Gabriel Handicap (1957, 1966, 1971, 1977, 1984, 1985, 1997)
- San Juan Capistrano Handicap (1957, 1959, 1970, 1971, 1972, 1975, 1978, 1981, 1983, 1984, 1985, 1986, 1987, 1989)
- Santa Maria Handicap (1958, 1972, 1975, 1976, 1978)
- San Bernardino Handicap (1960, 1969, 1971, 1973, 1975, 1981, 1983, 1985, 1987, 1989, 1990, 1991)
- Del Mar Handicap (1961, 1970, 1971, 1976, 1987, 1989, 1990)
- American Derby (1962)
- San Vicente Handicap (1962, 1966, 1967, 1976)
- Sam Marcos Handicap (1963, 1969, 1971, 1975, 1977, 1981, 1984, 1985)
- Santa Catalina Stakes (1964, 1970, 1986, 1988)
- Top Flight Handicap (1964)
- Charles H. Strub Stakes (1967, 1975, 1989)
- John C. Mabee Handicap (1968, 1975, 1976, 1980, 1981, 1991, 1992, 1993, 1994)
- San Luis Obispo Handicap (1968, 1971, 1972 (2), 1977, 1983, 1987, 1990)
- Del Mar Oaks (1970, 1971, 1975, 1979, 1982, 1986, 1991)
- San Luis Rey Handicap (1970, 1975, 1977, 1982, 1983, 1985, 1986, 1988, 1989)
- Hollywood Invitational Turf Handicap (1970, 1971, 1976, 1978, 1982, 1983, 1987)
- Frank E. Kilroe Mile Handicap (1971, 1972, 1977, 1978, 1982, 1986, 1987)
- Santa Anita Oaks (1971, 1973, 1974, 1986)
- Norfolk Stakes (1972, 1977, 1980)
- Chula Vista Handicap (1973, 1980, 1987, 1989)
- Beverly Hills Handicap (1973, 1974, 1975, 1977, 1978, 1986, 1988, 1989, 1992, 1993)
- Sunset Handicap (1973, 1974, 1976, 1978, 1979, 1980, 1981, 1982, 1983, 1987, 1992)
- Fantasy Stakes (1974, 1984, 1988)
- Hawthorne Handicap (1974, 1976)
- Santa Ana Handicap (1974, 1981, 1985, 1987)
- Hollywood Turf Cup Stakes (1981, 1989, 1991)
- Yellow Ribbon Stakes (1981, 1982, 1985, 1994)
- Goodwood Handicap (1984, 1985, 1987, 1990, 1991)
- John Henry Handicap (1986, 1989, 1990)
- Providencia Stakes (1986, 1988)
- Longacres Mile Handicap (1987)
- Kentucky Oaks (1988)
- Super Derby (1989)
