= Laz Barrera =

Cuban-born American thoroughbred racehorse trainer (1924–1991)

Personal information
- Born: May 8, 1924 Havana, Cuba
- Died: April 25, 1991 (aged 66)
- Occupation: Trainer

Horse racing career
- Sport: Horse racing
- Career wins: 2,268

Major racing wins
- Jerome Handicap (1971); Roamer Handicap (1971, 1974); Acorn Stakes (1973); Mother Goose Stakes (1973); Prioress Stakes (1973); Vosburgh Stakes (1973, 1977); Excelsior Handicap (1974); Fall Highweight Handicap (1974); La Brea Stakes (1975, 1976); Hempstead Handicap (1975); Paumonok Handicap (1975); Saratoga Special Stakes (1975); Tremont Stakes (1975); Carter Handicap (1976); Wood Memorial Stakes (1976); Whitney Handicap (1976, 1983); Belmont Futurity Stakes (1977, 1984); Haskell Invitational Handicap (1977); Hopeful Stakes (1977); Jamaica Handicap (1977); Laurel Futurity (1977); Sanford Stakes (1977, 1986); Strub Stakes (1977, 1979, 1982); Comely Stakes (1978); Hawthorne Handicap (1978, 1984, 1985); Hollywood Derby (1978); Jim Dandy Stakes (1978); Ladies Handicap (1978); Philip H. Iselin Breeders' Cup Handicap (1978); Santa Anita Derby (1978, 1990); Hollywood Gold Cup (1979, 1983); Jockey Club Gold Cup (1979, 1982); Santa Anita Handicap (1979); Woodward Stakes (1979); Alabama Stakes (1979); Monmouth Oaks (1981); Pennsylvania Derby (1981); Frank E. Kilroe Mile (1981, 1984); Sword Dancer Invitational Handicap (1982); Delaware Handicap (1984); Santa Margarita Handicap (1984); Santa Maria Handicap (1984, 1985); Kentucky Oaks (1986, 1987) American Classic Race wins: Kentucky Derby (1976, 1978); Preakness Stakes (1978); Belmont Stakes (1976, 1978); United States Triple Crown (1978)

Racing awards
- Eclipse Award for Outstanding Trainer (1976, 1977, 1978, 1979); U.S. Champion Trainer by earnings (1977, 1978, 1979, 1980); Big Sport of Turfdom Award (1979)

Honours
- National Museum of Racing and Hall of Fame (1979); Lazaro Barrera Stakes at Santa Anita Park (1991)

Significant horses
- Bold Forbes, Affirmed, J.O. Tobin; It's In The Air, Mister Frisky; Lemhi Gold, Tiffany Lass Aljamin
- Updated on August 1, 2007

Lazaro Sosa Barrera (May 8, 1924 – April 25, 1991) was a Cuban-born American Hall of Fame thoroughbred racehorse trainer.

Born in Havana, "Laz" Barrera was one of nine brothers who went on to become involved in thoroughbred horse racing in the United States. While in his teens, he began working at a racetrack in his native Cuba and within a few years was one of the country's most respected young trainers.

Seeking increased opportunities in a larger market, during the 1940s Barrera moved to Mexico to race horses at the Hipodromo de las Americas in Mexico City. There, he met California-based trainer Hal King, who encouraged him to come to the United States. Barrera did and in 1971 trained his first American Stakes race winner. In the ensuing years, he built a solid reputation and in late 1975 was given Bold Forbes to train, who had been that year's Puerto Rican two-year-old thoroughbred sprint champion. Racing in the U.S. in 1976 under jockey Ángel Cordero Jr., Bold Forbes won several important races for Barrera including the Wood Memorial Stakes in record time. He went on to win the most prestigious race of all, the Kentucky Derby, finished third in the Preakness Stakes and, for a converted sprinter, pulled off a dramatic win in the 1½ mile-long Belmont Stakes.

Barrera's accomplishments led to an offer from Louis & Patrice Wolfson to take over as head trainer for their Harbor View Farm in Ocala, Marion County, Florida. There, he took charge of Affirmed who, under 18-year-old jockey Steve Cauthen became one of the great horses in American racing history. Affirmed was a two-time Eclipse Award for Horse of the Year winner and won Eclipse Awards in each of the three years he raced. Barrera won 14 Grade 1 Stakes with Affirmed, the most by any stallion in history, and captured the 1978 U.S. Triple Crown, the tenth trainer to sweep the races in a season. Since then, one trainer (D. Wayne Lukas) won all three of the Triple Crown races in 1995 with two horses (Thunder Gulch and Timber Country). Twenty years after this unique double, Bob Baffert won the traditional Triple Crown with American Pharoah in 2015.

In a career that lasted almost 50 years, Barrera trained six champions and more than 140 American Stakes race winners. He was the leading money-winning trainer from 1977 to 1980 and became the only trainer to ever win four consecutive Eclipse Awards. In 1979, he was inducted into the National Museum of Racing and Hall of Fame.

Barrera died in 1991. The Lazaro Barrera Memorial Stakes, a Grade II seven-furlong race for 3-year-olds at Hollywood Park Racetrack, is named in his honor.
