= Andrew J. Crevolin =

American businessman and racehorse owner

- Born: December 22, 1905
- Died: March 26, 1992 (aged 86); Pasadena, California, US
- Occupations: Automobile dealer, Real estate investor, Racehorse owner/breeder
- Board member of: Sister Kenny Rehabilitation Institute
- Spouse(s): 1) Elma, 3) Jane Ann, 4) Dolores Gray
- Children: 3

Andrew Joseph Crevolin (December 22, 1905 – March 26, 1992) was an American businessman and Thoroughbred racehorse owner in California whose horse won the 1954 Santa Anita and Kentucky Derbys.

Crevolin attended Chaffey High School in Ontario, California, but by the 1930s was living in Alhambra where he was the exclusive Chrysler-Plymouth factory dealer for the eastern and northern sectors of Los Angeles. His prosperous automobile business led to investments in various enterprises including water resource companies, real estate, and horse racing.

In 1950, Andrew Crevolin was appointed a member of the board of directors of the Sister Kenny Rehabilitation Institute and would become chairman of its Southern California Chapter's fund drive committee for expansion of the Sister Kenny Memorial Hospital in El Monte, California.

Andrew Crevolin was the owner of the San Dimas Land & Water Company in San Dimas, California where he owned a home and had substantial land holdings, some of which he would develop for residential housing. In December 1964 he was appointed a member at large for the First Supervisorial District on the Los Angeles Watershed Board.

Divorced in February 1962 from his third wife, Jane Anne, on September 24, 1966, Andrew Crevolin married Tony Award-winning actress Dolores Gray. They made their home at his Oak Ridge Ranch near San Dimas in the East San Gabriel Valley.

== Thoroughbred racing ==
Andrew Crevolin became involved in the sport of Thoroughbred racing during the mid-1940s. In 1948 his filly, Flying Rythm, trained by future Hall of Fame inductee Frank Childs, won the Hollywood Oaks. His next good runner was Be Fleet who was trained by George Mayberry. Be Fleet's 1951 wins included the San Juan Capistrano Handicap and a three-length win over the great Citation in the Argonaut Handicap. In 1953, George Mayberry was followed as trainer of Crevolin's horses by another future U.S. Racing Hall of Fame inductee, Bill Molter.

=== Leading owner ===
Crevolin's next top horse was the multiple-stakes-winning four-year-old Imbros, who set a world record for seven furlongs in winning the 1954 Malibu Sequet Stakes at Santa Anita Park and equaled the world record for 8 1/2 furlongs in winning the 1954 Californian Stakes at Hollywood Park Racetrack. In addition to setting new track records at Santa Anita and Hollywood Park, Imbros twice equaled the Santa Anita Park track record for six furlongs plus he set two track records for eight and nine furlongs at Bay Meadows Racetrack. That same year, Crevolin and Bill Molter enjoyed even greater success with three-year-old Determine. A very small colt, he was overlooked by most bidders at the 1952 Keeneland Summer Sale and was purchased by Crevolin for just $12,000. Determine most notably won the 1954 Santa Anita Derby and then on May 1 won the most prestigious race in the United States, the Kentucky Derby. On the day that Determine won the Derby, Imbros won the William P. Kyne Handicap, making Crevolin the first person in the United States to ever win two $100,000 races on the same day.

In a tape-recorded interview with a reporter from the Blood-Horse magazine that was published on August 14, 1954, Crevolin created a storm in the U.S. racing industry when he said, among other things, that his stable didn't always try to win with its young horses in their first few starts. Following hearings into the matter and an apology from Crevolin, he was suspended in September of that year for conduct detrimental to racing and banned through November 2. The ban meant that his horses missed important races.

Crevolin remained in racing for several more years. In 1961, his trainer was Edward A. Neloy, who conditioned Mighty Fair to a win in the Ladies Handicap at New York's Aqueduct Racetrack.

Crevolin was living in Pasadena, California, at the time of his death in 1992. His son, Robert D. Crevolin (1944–2004), was a member of Del Mar Thoroughbred Club for thirty-five years and owned and raced Thoroughbreds for several years.
