= List of horse accidents =

List of people who had severe injuries or died from accidents related to horses

This is a list of people who were seriously injured or killed in horse-related accidents. Where relevant, the list also notes documented political or historical consequences of these accidents.

== Celebrities ==
- Holbrook Blinn (1872–1928), Broadway stage star and silent screen actor, died from injuries in an accident on the grounds of his estate.
- Cole Porter (1891–1964) American composer and songwriter. In a 1937 riding accident his legs were crushed leaving him in chronic pain, largely crippled. (According to a biography by William McBrien and oral history by Brendan Gill.) His right leg was amputated in 1958 as a result of the injury.
- Shyam Chadha (1920–1951), a celebrated Indian actor from Hindi and Punjabi films, died from injuries suffered after falling off a horse.
- Maureen Connolly (1934–1969), tennis star, career ended in 1954 by injuries suffered in a collision between her horse and a truck.
- Malcolm Baldrige Jr. (1922–1987), American politician and United States Secretary of Commerce from 1981 until his death in 1987, from internal injuries sustained in a rodeo accident, when the horse he was riding fell on him during a calf-roping competition.
- Roy Kinnear (1934–1988), British character actor, bled to death due to a broken pelvis sustained in a fall from a horse.
- Christopher Reeve (1952–2004), actor, paralyzed on May 27, 1995 from the neck down following a fall from his horse while riding cross-country in a 3-day event.
- Kazu Makino (b. 1969), a rock singer, suffered an accident falling from a horse in 2002; the horse trampled her jaw and crushed her facial bones, which required massive reconstructive surgery.
- Julie Strain (1962–2021), American actress/model, in the 1980s, suffered an accident, falling from a horse, resulting in a head injury, causing retrograde amnesia and dementia that eventually ended her life.

== Historical figures ==
- According to this legend, romanticized by Alexander Pushkin in his celebrated ballad "The Song of the Wise Oleg", it was prophesied by the pagan priests that Oleg of Novgorod (?–912) would take death from his stallion. Proud of his own foretelling abilities, he sent the horse away. Many years later he asked where his horse was, and was told it had died. He asked to see the remains and was taken to the place where the bones lay. When he touched the horse's skull with his boot a snake slithered from the skull and bit him. Oleg died, thus fulfilling the prophecy.
- King Afonso I of Portugal (1109–1185), was severely injured in a fall from a horse in 1167 during a battle; he was captured and as ransom, Portugal had to surrender to Castile all conquests made in Galicia in the previous years; they were never recovered.
- Afonso, Prince of Portugal (1475–1491), died during a riding accident near the Tagus River.
- King Alexander III of Scotland (d. 1286), when he and his horse went off the road in the dark, and fell over a cliff; the long term outcome was increased English influence and the First Scottish War of Independence and the immediate result was a regency because heirs were underage or unborn.
- Al-Aziz Uthman (d. 1198), sultan of Egypt.
- Brian Faulkner, former Prime Minister of Northern Ireland.
- Cambyses II, Persian king, died accidentally in 521 BC, according to Herodotus.
- Eadgils, semi-legendary king of Sweden, split his skull when his horse stumbled and fell.
- Emily Davison, English suffragette, threw herself in front of the King's horse at the Derby in 1913 and was trampled to death.
- Enguerrand III, Lord of Coucy (c. 1182–1242), fell from his horse onto his sword and died.
- Francis II, Duke of Brittany (d. 9 September 1488), from a horse riding accident.
- Frederick Augustus II of Saxony (d. 1854), while on a journey in Brennbüchel, Karrösten, Tyrol, when he fell in front of a horse that stepped on his head.
- Frederick I Barbarossa (d. 1190), while crossing the Saleph River in Cilicia, south-eastern Anatolia. It is thought that he was thrown from his horse into the cold water and had a fatal heart attack or drowned as a result.
- Fulk of Jerusalem, fell from his horse while hunting in 1143. His wooden saddle fell after him, striking him on the head, causing fatal injuries.
- Genghis Khan (d. 1227), from injuries resulting from a fall from a horse.
- Geoffrey Plantagenet, Duke of Brittany and son of Henry II of England, d. 19 August 1186 trampled to death by his horse during a tournament; with his death, Plantagenet rule of Brittany was weakened (son Arthur and daughter Eleanor were underage and in future imprisoned by uncle John I of England) — finally decades later, the duchy is passed by Philip II of France to the House of Dreux, descendants of Geoffrey's widow's other marriage.
- Geronimo (1829–1909), prominent leader of the Bedonkohe Apache who fought against Mexico and Texas for several decades during the Apache Wars. Geronimo was thrown from his horse while riding home and lay in the cold all night, contracting pneumonia, from which he died.
- Isabella of Aragon, wife of king Philip III of France — d. 1271 at 24 from a fall.
- John I of Castile (d. 9 October 1390), while riding in a fantasia with some of the light horsemen known as the farfanes
- John of Ibelin, the Old Lord of Beirut (d. 1236), after his horse fell on him and crushed him
- Leopold V of Austria (d. 31 December 1194), after falling from his horse at a tournament in Graz.
- Louis II of Hungary, died at the Battle of Mohács in 1526 after falling from his horse.
- Louis III of France (879–882), king of West Francia, died from a skull fracture after falling from a horse while chasing a girl.
- Louis IV of France (920–54), king of France, died after falling from his horse while hunting a wolf.
- Louis V of France, king of France, died 987 after falling from a horse during a hunt.
- Maria Malibran, opera singer, died 1836 after falling from her horse during a hunt.
- Marjorie Bruce, daughter of Robert the Bruce and half-sister of David II of Scotland d. 2 March 1316 after a fall from a horse caused premature labour; her baby survived to become King Robert II of Scotland.
- Mary, Queen of Hungary, died childless but heavily pregnant on 17 May 1395 when her horse tripped, threw her and landed on top of her.
- Mary, Duchess of Burgundy (d. 1482), from a horse riding accident; after her death, the Burgundy estates (of which she herself had lost Picardy and duchy of Burgundy) formed a part of Habsburg domains.
- Minamoto no Yoritomo (源 頼朝, May 9, 1147–February 9, 1199)
- Najm ad-Din Ayyub, father of Saladin, died on 9 August 1173 after falling from his horse.
- Nero Claudius Drusus (in 9 BC), general in Germania Inferior, brother of Emperor Tiberius and father of Emperor Claudius.
- Philip of France (1116–1131), heir of king Louis VI of France ? d. 1131, from a fall from a horse.
- Pope Urban VI (d. 1389), from injuries sustained after falling from a mule.
- Robert Peel, thrown from his horse while riding up Constitution Hill in London on 29 June 1850. The horse stumbled on top of him and he died three days later on 2 July at the age of 62 due to a clavicular fracture rupturing his subclavian vessels.
- Roderick, king of the Visigoths (d. 712), drowned after falling from his horse while attempting to escape through a river, following his defeat by the Moors who then conquered the rest of Hispania. Although his body was never found, his horse was recovered, with a boot tangled in one stirrup.
- Saborios, Byzantine general and rebel (d. 678), when his horse bolted, slamming his head on a city gate and killing him.
- Seleucus II, ruler of the Seleucid Empire, died in December of 225 BC by falling from his horse.
- Stefan Dragutin, Serbian king, in 1282 broke leg after falling from horse, became lame and so had to give the throne to Stefan Milutin; this later provoked a war between Milutin and Dragutin's son Vladislav.
- Theodoric Strabo, died in 481 after falling from his horse over a spear rack. His death allowed Theoderic to assume uncontested supreme command and unify the Ostrogoths into a force that conquered Italy after the Fall of the Roman Empire.
- Theodosius II, Roman emperor (d. 450)
- Theophylactus of Constantinople, Patriarch of Constantinople, died 956.
- Walter de Merton, Lord Chancellor of England (d. 1277)
- William the Conqueror died aged 60 at the Convent of St. Gervais, near Rouen, France, on 9 September 1087 from abdominal injuries received from his saddle pommel when he fell off a horse at the Siege of Mantes.
- William III of England (d. 1702), from injuries received after his horse tripped on a molehill.

== Horse racing ==
- Charles W. Boland, Canadian jockey, thrown from his horse.
- Hughie Cairns, 40, Australian jockey who died on 27 July 1929 in a fall at Moonee Valley Racecourse.
- Georgie Campbell, 37, British equestrian who died on 26 May 2024 after a fall at Bicton International Horse Trials.
- Philip Cheng, Hong Kong jockey, fell from horse and was trampled to death.
- Stefano Cherchi, 23, Italian jockey, died in 2024 from injuries sustained in a fall at Canberra Racecourse.
- Tom Clayton, Australian jockey, died 1909 from injuries sustained in a 12 horse fall at Rosehill Racecourse.
- Tom Corrigan, Australian steeplechase jockey, died 1894 after a fall at Caulfield Racecourse.
- Amado Credidio, 24, Panamanian jockey, died when his mount Spartan Monk clipped heels with another horse in a race at Aqueduct on March 29, 1982. He fell into the path of oncoming horses which could not avoid him.
- Earl Dew, 19, American jockey, 1940 national champion. Died from head injuries caused from a spill in the 6th race on 2 February 1941. It was Earl Dew day at Agua Caliente Racetrack.
- George Ede, English jockey, died from injuries sustained in a fall during the 1870 Grand National.
- Avelino Gomez, Cuban-born jockey based in Canada, died from injuries sustained in a fall in the Canadian Oaks at Woodbine Racetrack in June 1980.
- Billy Haughton, Harness racing driver, died from injuries sustained in a crash at Yonkers Raceway.
- Frank Hayes, American jockey, died from a heart attack while riding his horse Sweet Kiss to victory at Belmont Park.
- Dean Holland, Australian jockey, died after a fall at Donald Racecourse when his mount Headingley inexplicably veered off course and crashed into the running rail.
- Willy Kan, Hong Kong jockey, fell from horse and was trampled to death.
- Kieran Kelly, Irish jockey, died from injuries caused by a fall at Kilbeggan racecourse, 2003.
- Manny Mercer, died in 1959 after being kicked in the head after a fall at Ascot Racecourse.
- Donald Nicholson, killed in the 1885 Caulfield Cup fall, when 17 of the 44 runners fell.
- Ray Oliver, killed in a fall at Kalgoorlie Western Australia.
- Jason Oliver, killed in a fall at Belmont when his horse broke a front leg.
- Álvaro Pineda, Mexican jockey, died in 1975 through a blow to the head in the starting gates; brother of Roberto Pineda.
- Roberto Pineda, Mexican jockey, died in 1978; brother of Alvaro Pineda.
- Michael Rowland, American jockey, died from head injuries after falling from his horse.
- Neville Sellwood, Australian Racing Hall of Fame jockey killed in 1962 at Maisons-Laffitte Racecourse, France.
- Brian Taylor, British jockey, died from injuries sustained after tumbling from his horse.
- Mike Venezia, American jockey, died after a race fall.
- Jack Westrope, American jockey, died in 1958.
- George Woolf, Canadian jockey, concussion after a fall during a race at Santa Anita Park believed to have been caused by hypoglycemia. (Woolf was a Type 1 diabetic.)
- Karl Umrigar, Indian jockey, died in 1979.

== Jousting and tournaments ==
- John Dunbar, Earl of Moray (d. 1390) a Scottish nobleman.
- Henry II of France (d. 1559), died from lance wound; his death was a factor in the end of jousting as a sport.

== Others ==
- Álvares de Azevedo (1831–1852), Brazilian Romantic poet.
- Bryan Anderson (1969–2013), showjumper, Canadian Equestrian Team.
- Tanya Brady (1973–2022), rower, killed by being thrown from horse.
- Ellen Church (1904–1965), first female flight attendant.
- Paul Clarkin, died from a fall during a polo match, "playing a blinder".
- Gabriel Donoso (1960–2006), Chilean polo player, died from a fall during a polo match.
- Frederic Brooks Dugdale (1877–1902), English recipient of the Victoria Cross.
- Carlos Gracida, thrown and crushed by horse during a polo match in 2014.
- Edward Hempstead (1780–1817), American lawyer, thrown and died six days later.
- Kim Hyung-chil, died in December 2006 while competing in the cross-country part of the three-day event in the 2006 Asian Games.
- Erica Marshall, in 2012, Marshall died in an explosion of a hyperbaric oxygen chamber when the horse that was being treated caused a spark with his metal horseshoe.
- Billy Pearson (1920–2002), American jockey.
- Kenneth Pinyan, died in July 2005 after engaging in anal sex with a horse.
