= Fighting Mad (horse) =

American thoroughbred racehorse

- Sire: New Year's Day
- Grandsire: Street Cry
- Dam: Smokey's Love
- Damsire: Forestry
- Sex: Filly
- Foaled: February 18, 2016
- Country: USA
- Colour: Bay
- Breeder: Gary and Mary West Stables Inc
- Owner: Gary and Mary West
- Trainer: Bob Baffert
- Jockey: Abel Cedillo
- Record: 8:5-1-0
- Earnings: $444,008

Major wins
- Torrey Pines Stakes (2020); Clement L. Hirsch Stakes (2020); Santa Maria Stakes (2020)
- Last updated on 11 August 2020

Fighting Mad (foaled February 18, 2016) is an American Thoroughbred mare and the winner of the 2020 Clement L. Hirsch Stakes.

== Career ==
Fighting Mad's first race was on August 25, 2018, where she won a Maiden Special Weight race at Del Mar. This was her only race of the season.

She began her 2019 season with an April 30, 2019 Allowance race win at Churchill Downs. On May 17, 2019, she competed in her first graded stakes race - the 2019 Miss Preakness Stakes, but finished in a disappointing 7th place. She then did another Allowance Optional Claiming race on July 19, 2019, where she came in 2nd.

On August 17, 2019, at Del Mar, she won the Grade-3 Torrey Pines Stakes. Despite her lack of results at that point, she was the 2-1 favorite and defeated Hollywood Hills by six lengths. This was the final race of her 2019 season.

She began her 2020 season at the Grade-3 2020 Desert Stormer Stakes in May with a 4th-place finish. She rebounded just two weeks later though by winning the May 31st, 2020 Grade-2 Santa Maria Stakes. She came in as a large underdog behind 2-1 Hard Not to Love and the 3/5 favorite Ce Ce and won by 3 1/4th lengths.

On August 2, 2020, she got the biggest win of her career when she captured the Grade-1 Clement L. Hirsch Stakes. She came in as the 1-1 favorite and again defeated Hard Not to Love and Ce Ce. She got in front early with a strong break and beat Ollie's Candy by a half length. This win earned the horse a berth in the 2020 Breeders' Cup Distaff.

== Pedigree ==
Pedigree of Fighting Mad (USA), 2016
Sire New Year's Day (USA) b. 2011	Street Cry (IRE) b. 1998	Machiavellian	Mr. Prospector
Sire New Year's Day (USA) b. 2011	Street Cry (IRE) b. 1998	Machiavellian	Coup De Folie
Sire New Year's Day (USA) b. 2011	Street Cry (IRE) b. 1998	Helen Street	Troy
Sire New Year's Day (USA) b. 2011	Street Cry (IRE) b. 1998	Helen Street	Waterway
Sire New Year's Day (USA) b. 2011	Justwhistledixie (USA) b. 2006	Dixie Union	Dixieland Band
Sire New Year's Day (USA) b. 2011	Justwhistledixie (USA) b. 2006	Dixie Union	Shes Tops
Sire New Year's Day (USA) b. 2011	Justwhistledixie (USA) b. 2006	General Jeanne	Honour And Glory
Sire New Year's Day (USA) b. 2011	Justwhistledixie (USA) b. 2006	General Jeanne	Ahpo Hel
Dam Smokey's Love (USA) b. 2005	Forestry (USA) b. 1996	Storm Cat	Storm Bird
Dam Smokey's Love (USA) b. 2005	Forestry (USA) b. 1996	Storm Cat	Terlingua
Dam Smokey's Love (USA) b. 2005	Forestry (USA) b. 1996	Shared Interest	Pleasant Colony
Dam Smokey's Love (USA) b. 2005	Forestry (USA) b. 1996	Shared Interest	Surgery
Dam Smokey's Love (USA) b. 2005	Smokey Mirage (USA) b. 1996	Holy Bull	Great Above
Dam Smokey's Love (USA) b. 2005	Smokey Mirage (USA) b. 1996	Holy Bull	Sharon Brown
Dam Smokey's Love (USA) b. 2005	Smokey Mirage (USA) b. 1996	Verbasle	Slewpy
Dam Smokey's Love (USA) b. 2005	Smokey Mirage (USA) b. 1996	Verbasle	Verbality
