= Del Mar Handicap =

- Class: Grade II
- Location: Del Mar Racetrack; Del Mar, California, United States
- Inaugurated: 1937
- Race type: Thoroughbred – Flat racing

Race information
- Distance: 1 3/8 miles (11 furlongs)
- Surface: Turf
- Track: Left-handed
- Qualification: Three-year-olds & up
- Weight: Assigned
- Purse: US$250,000 (2015)

The Del Mar Handicap is an American thoroughbred horse race run each year during the third week of August at the Del Mar Racetrack in Del Mar, California. The Grade II race is open to horses, age three and up, willing to race one and three-eighths miles on the Jimmy Durante turf course.

Since inception, the Del Mar Handicap has been contested at various distances:

- 1 1/16 miles: 1937–1948
- 1 1/8 miles: 1949–1969
- about 1 1/4 miles on dirt: 1976–1985
- 1 3/8 miles: 1970–1975, 1986–present

The Del Mar Handicap was run in two divisions in 1972.

In 1969, Figonero won the race in a world record time of 1:46.20 for 1 1/8 miles.

== Records ==
Speed record: (at current distance of 1 3/8 miles)

- 2:11.14 – Spring House (2008)

Most wins:

- 4 – Gold Phoenix (IRE) (2022, 2023, 2024, 2025)

Most wins by an owner:

- 6 – Little Red Feather Racing (2018, 2020, 2022, 2023, 2024, 2025)

Most wins by a jockey:

- 8 – Bill Shoemaker (1950, 1953, 1954, 1971, 1976, 1982, 1983, 1987)

Most wins by a trainer:

- 10 – Philip D'Amato (2014, 2015, 2017, 2018, 2019, 2020, 2022, 2023, 2024, 2025)

== Winners ==
Year	Winner	Age	Jockey	Trainer	Owner	Time
2026	Test Score	4	Juan J. Hernandez	H. Graham Motion	Amerman Racing	2:14.76
2025	Gold Phoenix (IRE)	7	Flavien Prat	Philip D'Amato	Agave Racing Stable, Little Red Feather Racing, Sterling Stables & Marsha Naify	2:16.09
2024	Gold Phoenix (IRE)	6	Kyle Frey	Philip D'Amato	Little Red Feather Racing, Sterling Stables & Marsha Naify	2:17.05
2023	Gold Phoenix (IRE)	5	Juan J. Hernandez	Philip D'Amato	Little Red Feather Racing, Sterling Stables & Marsha Naify	2:15.34
2022	Gold Phoenix (IRE)	4	Flavien Prat	Philip D'Amato	Little Red Feather Racing, Sterling Stables & Marsha Naify	2:14.51
2021	Astronaut	4	Victor Espinoza	John Shirreffs	John MB O'Connor	2:15.97
2020	Red King	6	Umberto Rispoli	Philip D'Amato	Little Red Feather Racing, G Jacobsen & P Belmonte	2:15.75
2019	Acclimate	5	Florent Geroux	Philip D'Amato	The Ellwood Johnston Trust & Timmy Time Racing	2:12.71
2018	Fashion Business	4	Flavien Prat	Philip D'Amato	Little Red Feather Racing and Naify, Marsha	2:13.84
2017	Hunt	5	Flavien Prat	Philip D'Amato	Michael House	2:14.93
2016	Ashleyluvssugar	5	Gary Stevens	Peter Eurton	Alesia/Bran Jam Stable/Ciaglia Racing	2:16.11
2015	Big John B	6	Rafael Bejarano	Philip D'Amato	Michael House	2:16.37
2014	Big John B	5	Mike E. Smith	Philip D'Amato	Michael House	2:12.81
2013	Vagabond Shoes	6	Victor Espinoza	John W. Sadler	Hronis Racing	2:11.94
2012	Casino Host	4	Joseph Talamo	Ronald W. Ellis	Gary & Mary West	2:14.77
2011	Celtic New Year	4	Victor Espinoza	John W. Sadler	Michael Jawl	2:14.92
2010	Champ Pegasus	4	Joel Rosario	Richard Mandella	Diamond A Racing/Vargas	2:11.93
2009	Spring House	7	Alex Solis	Julio C. Canani	Randall D. Hubbard	2:12.61
2008	Spring House	6	Corey Nakatani	Julio C. Canani	Randall D. Hubbard	2:11.14
2007	After Market	4	Alex Solis	John Shirreffs	Pam & Martin Wygod	2:13.01
2006	T.H. Approval	5	Alex Solis	Eduardo Inda	Tadahiro Hotehama	2:12.34
2005	Leprechaun Kid	6	Tyler Baze	Mike R. Mitchell	Anastasi, Ukegawa, et al.	2:12.81
2004	Star Over The Bay	6	Tyler Baze	Mike R. Mitchell	G. Racing et al.	2:12.71
2003	Irish Warrior	5	Alex Solis	Wallace Dollase	Coleman, Dasaro, et al.	2:12.28
2002	Delta Form	6	Goncalino Almeida	Jenine Sahadi	Team Valor	2:12.15
2001	Timboroa	5	Laffit Pincay Jr.	Robert J. Frankel	Edmund A. Gann	2:12.59
2000	Northern Quest	5	Chris McCarron	Robert J. Frankel	3 Plus U Stable	2:12.65
1999	Sayarshan	4	Brice Blanc	Nick Canani	Dehaven/Prestonwood	2:14.20
1998	Bonapartiste	4	Chris McCarron	Ron McAnally	Ecurie Fabien Ouaki	2:14.00
1997	Rainbow Dancer	6	Alex Solis	Jenine Sahadi	Evergreen Farm	2:13.60
1996	Dernier Empereur	6	Pat Valenzuela	Ben D.A. Cecil	Gary A. Tanaka	2:13.80
1995	Royal Chariot	5	Laffit Pincay Jr.	Edwin J. Gregson	D&V Enterprises, Inc.	2:13.60
1994	Navarone	6	Pat Valenzuela	Rodney Rash	Robert E. Hibbert	2:14.20
1993	Luazur	4	Pat Day	Robert J. Frankel	Edmund A. Gann	2:15.00
1992	Navarone	4	Pat Valenzuela	Rodney Rash	Robert E. Hibbert	2:15.00
1991	My Style	4	Kent Desormeaux	Darrell Vienna	David Milch	2:13.20
1990	Live The Dream	4	Alex Solis	Charles Whittingham	Bradley/Bradley/Chandler	2:13.00
1989	Payant	5	Robbie Davis	Charles Whittingham	Correas, Seabaugh et al.	2:15.20
1988	Sword Dance	4	Chris McCarron	John Gosden	Daniel Schwartz	2:15.80
1987	Swink	4	Bill Shoemaker	Charles Whittingham	Nelson Bunker Hunt	2:13.80
1986	Raipillan	4	Russell Baze	Warren Stute	Clement L. Hirsch	2:14.60
1985	Barberstown	5	Fernando Toro	John Gosden	Bell Bloodstock & McDermott	1:58.00
1984	Precisionist	3	Chris McCarron	L.R. Fenstermaker	Fred W. Hooper	1:56.80
1983	Bel Bolide	5	Bill Shoemaker	John Gosden	Stonechurch Stable	1:58.20
1982	Muttering	3	Bill Shoemaker	D. Wayne Lukas	Tartan Farms (James & Virginia Binger)	1:57.00
1981	Wickerr	6	Chris McCarron	Robert J. Frankel	Edmund A. Gann	1:57.60
1980	Go West Young Man	5	Ed Delahoussaye	Mary Lou Tuck	Wild Plum Farm	1:58.20
1979	Ardiente	4	Chris McCarron	Edwin J. Gregson	Jan Siegel	1:56.80
1978	Palton	5	Henry E. Moreno	Henry M. Moreno	Pinetree Stable	1:57.60
1977	Ancient Title	7	Darrel McHargue	Keith L. Stucki	Kirkland Stable	1:55.60
1976	Riot in Paris	5	Bill Shoemaker	Charles Whittingham	M. J. Bradley & Whittingham	1:57.60
1975	Cruiser II	6	Frank Olivares	Ron McAnally	Contreras, Mamakos, Stubrin	2:14.60
1974	Redtop III	5	Fernando Toro	Evan S. Jackson	Daniel Schwartz	2:16.00
1973	Red Reality	7	Braulio Baeza	MacKenzie Miller	Cragwood Stables	2:17.00
1972	Hill Circus	4	Fernando Toro	John H. Adams	El Peco Ranch	2:16.00
1972	Chrisaway	4	Robert Howard	Paul R. Fout	Beverly R. Steinman	2:16.20
1971	Pinjara	6	Bill Shoemaker	Charles Whittingham	Howard B. Keck	2:15.60
1970	Daryl's Joy	4	Johnny Sellers	Charles Whittingham	Robert K. C. Goh	2:15.60
1969	Figonero	4	Álvaro Pineda	Warren Stute	Clement L. Hirsch	1:46.20
1968	Quicken Tree	5	Bill Hartack	Clyde Turk	Rowan & Whitney	1:46.60
1967	Native Diver	8	Jerry Lambert	Buster Millerick	M/M Louis K. Shapiro	1:46.60
1966	Old Mose	4	Donald Pierce	Joseph Manzi	Robert E. Hibbert	1:47.20
1965	Terry's Secret	3	Alex Maese	Carl A. Roles	Poltex Stable	1:47.00
1964	Viking Spirit	4	Kenneth Church	Jim Nazworthy	Thomas E. Brittingham III	1:48.00
1963	Mr. Consistency	5	Kenneth Church	Jim Nazworthy	Ann Peppers	1:47.00
1962	Crazy Kid	4	Alex Maese	John G. Canty	Vista Hermosa Stable	1:47.60
1961	Scotland	5	Merlin Volzke	Charles Whittingham	W. M. Ingram	1:46.80
1960	How Now	7	Edward Burns	Cecil Jolly	George C. Newell	1:46.60
1959	Twentyone Guns	4	George Taniguchi	Fred M. Smith	M/M John Eyraud	1:47.20
1958	Noredski	5	Donald Pierce	Reggie Cornell	Jacques Braunstein	1:47.60
1957	How Now	4	Raymond York	Cecil Jolly	George C. Newell	1:47.60
1956	Arrogate	5	Johnny Longden	Reggie Cornell	M/M Dick Griegorian	1:47.00
1955	Arrogate	4	Johnny Longden	Reggie Cornell	M/M Dick Griegorian	1:47.60
1954	Stranglehold	5	Bill Shoemaker	Red McDaniel	M/M N. Gordon Phillips	1:48.60
1953	Goose Khal	4	Bill Shoemaker	Willie F. Alvarado	Harry Brown	1:48.60
1952	Grantor	4	Johnny Longden	William B. Finnegan	Louis B. Mayer	1:47.60
1951	Blue Reading	4	Bill Pearson	Red McDaniel	M/M Clement L. Hirsch	1:48.60
1950	Frankly	5	Bill Shoemaker	Buster Millerick	Frank Frankel	1:48.60
1949	Top's Boy	5	Ralph Neves	William Molter	Kinsey Ranch	1:48.80
1948	Frankly	3	Jack Westrope	Buster Millerick	Frank Frankel	1:42.60
1947	Iron Maiden	6	William Parnell	Charles T. Leavitt	Ellwood B. Johnston	1:43.20
1946	Olhaverry	7	Melvin Peterson	Anthony E. Silver	Pan de Azucar Stable	1:43.20
1945	Texas Sandman	4	Melvin Peterson	Earl H. Sorrell	W. David Rorex	1:43.20
1941	Royal Crusader	4	Lester Balaski	Paul Meredith	R. C. Stable	1:43.60
1940	Big Flash	3	Eugene Rodriguez	Clyde Phillips	French Lick Springs St	1:43.00
1939	Wedding Call	3	Willis Ward	Charles E. McClain	W. C. Gaffers & J. H. Sattler	1:44.00
1938	Ligaroti	6	Willie Moran	Lindsay C. Howard	Binglin Stable	1:43.80
1937	Sally's Booter	5	Tim Sena	Joe Luddy	Anthony Puccinelli	1:44.80
