= Ce Ce =

American thoroughbred racehorse

- Sire: Elusive Quality
- Grandsire: Gone West
- Dam: Miss Houdini
- Damsire: Belong to Me
- Sex: Mare
- Foaled: 5 March 2016
- Country: United States
- Color: Chestnut
- Breeder: Bo Hirsch
- Owner: Bo Hirsch
- Trainer: Michael W. McCarthy
- Record: 22:11-2-4
- Earnings: $2,407,100

Major wins
- Apple Blossom Handicap (2020); Beholder Mile Stakes (2020); Princess Rooney Stakes (2021, 2022); Chillingworth Stakes (2021, 2022); Azeri Stakes (2022); Breeders' Cup wins: Breeders' Cup Filly & Mare Sprint (2021)

Awards
- American Champion Female Sprint Horse (2021)
- Last updated on 31 December 2022

Ce Ce (foaled March 5, 2016) is an American Champion Thoroughbred racehorse and the winner of the 2020 Apple Blossom Handicap and 2021 Breeders' Cup Filly & Mare Sprint.

== Background ==
Ce Ce is by Elusive Quality out of Bo Hirsch's home-bred Belong to Me mare Miss Houdini, a winner at the Grade 1 level, having taken the Del Mar Debutante Stakes at 2 in 2002. Miss Houdini is also the dam of 2009 Grade II Arkansas Derby winner Papa Clem and is in turn out of the Lord Avie mare Magical Maiden, who was a $26,000 2-year-old purchase by Bo Hirsch's father—the late Clement L. Hirsch—and went on to win the 1991 Grade I Hollywood Starlet and the 1992 Grade I Las Virgenes Stakes earning $903,245. Miss Houdini, trained by Warren Stute, only made a total of four starts at two and three, with earnings of $187,600.

== Career ==
=== 2019: three-year-old season ===
Ce Ce's first race was a Maiden Special Weight race on April 12, 2019, at Santa Anita Park, where she came in first. She participated in her first graded race on June 8, 2019, when she came in 4th at the Grade-1 Acorn Stakes.

=== 2020: four-year-old season ===
She began her 2020 season with a February 17, 2020 win in an Allowance Optional Claiming race at Santa Anita Park.

On March 14, 2020, she got the biggest win of her career when she won the 2020 Beholder Mile Stakes, edging out Hard Not to Love.

Ce Ce picked up another Grade-1 win on April 18, 2020, this time in the 2020 Apple Blossom Handicap, besting Ollie's Candy by a head.

On May 31, 2020, Ce Ce finished in third place in the 2020 Santa Maria Stakes behind her rival, Hard Not to Love.

=== 2021: five-year-old season ===
Ce Ce started her 2021 season at Santa Anita where she was an easy winner of a seven-furlong allowance optional claiming race in mid-April. That set the table for a stretch-out effort in the 1 1/16-mile Grade 2 Santa Maria Stakes that didn't pan out. Kept around one turn, Ce Ce shipped to South Florida and was a 3 1/4-length winner of the Grade 2 Princess Rooney Stakes.

Ce Ce was brought to Saratoga for the Ballerina Stakes against a strong field including champion Gamine. Gamine got off to a good start and set fractions of 23.20, 45.68 and 1:09.20 while Ce Ce tagged along in fourth place. In the end, Ce Ce finished in third place, three lengths behind Gamine in a time of 1:21.39.

Prior to the Breeders' Cup she was a handy winner of the 3 October GIII Chillingworth Stakes at Santa Anita.

On November 6, again Ce Ce faced Gamine who was a hot 2/5 odds-on favorite in her attempt to repeat winning the Breeders' Cup Filly & Mare Sprint at Del Mar. In a five horse field Ce Ce tracked Gamine and the three-year-old Bella Sofia four wide into the turn, easing out around them on the turn and loomed five wide into the stretch. She cleared them with a furlong remaining and drew away late. For her performances during the year Ce Ce earned US Champion Female Sprint Horse honors.

== Statistics ==
Date	Distance	Race	Grade	Track	Odds	Field	Finish	Winning Time	Winning (Losing) Margin	Jockey	Ref
2019 – three-year-old season
Apr 12, 2019	6 furlongs	Maiden Special Weight		Santa Anita	6.20	11	1	1:10.96	2 1/4 lengths	Victor Espinoza	
May 11, 2019	6 1/2 furlongs	Allowance Optional Claiming		Santa Anita	0.50*	6	2	1:16.21	(neck)	Victor Espinoza	
Jun 8, 2019	1 mile	Acorn Stakes	I	Belmont Park	4.00	9	4	1:33.58	(8 1/4 lengths)	Victor Espinoza	
2020 – four-year-old season
Feb 17, 2020	6 1/2 furlongs	Allowance Optional Claiming		Santa Anita	0.50*	5	1	1:16.04	4 1/2 lengths	Victor Espinoza	
Mar 14, 2020	1 mile	Beholder Mile Stakes	I	Santa Anita	4.20	6	1	1:37.33	3 1/4 lengths	Victor Espinoza	
Apr 18, 2020	1 1/16 miles	Apple Blossom Handicap	I	Oaklawn Park	3.90	14	1	1:43.14	head	Victor Espinoza	
May 31, 2020	1 1/16 miles	Santa Maria Stakes	II	Santa Anita	0.60*	5	3	1:42.12	(5 1/2 lengths)	Victor Espinoza	
Aug 2, 2020	1 1/16 miles	Clement L. Hirsch Stakes	I	Del Mar	2.40	6	3	1:43.46	(5 1/4 lengths)	Victor Espinoza	
Sep 5, 2020	7 furlongs	Derby City Distaff Stakes	I	Churchill Downs	2.30	7	4	1:21.07	(3 1/2 lengths)	John R. Velazquez	
Nov 7, 2020	1 1/8 miles	Breeders' Cup Distaff	I	Keeneland	14.60	10	5	1:47.84	(4 1/4 lengths)	John R. Velazquez	
2021 – five-year-old season
Apr 17, 2021	7 furlongs	Allowance Optional Claiming		Santa Anita	1.50	6	1	1:22.56	3 1/4 lengths	Victor Espinoza	
May 22, 2021	1 1/16 miles	Santa Maria Stakes	II	Santa Anita	1.50	4	4	1:43.77	(10 1/4 lengths)	Victor Espinoza	
Jul 3, 2021	7 furlongs	Princess Rooney Stakes	II	Gulfstream Park	2.70	8	1	1:21.94	3 1/4 lengths	Victor Espinoza	
Aug 28, 2021	7 furlongs	Ballerina Stakes	I	Saratoga	4.10	7	3	1:21.61	(3 lengths)	Victor Espinoza	
Oct 3, 2021	6 1/2 furlongs	Chillingworth Stakes	III	Santa Anita	0.20*	5	1	1:15.86	5 lengths	Victor Espinoza	
Nov 6, 2021	7 furlongs	Breeders' Cup Filly & Mare Sprint	I	Del Mar	6.20	5	1	1:21.00	2 1/2 lengths	Victor Espinoza	
2022 – six-year-old season
Feb 5, 2022	7 furlongs	Santa Monica Stakes	II	Santa Anita	0.50*	5	2	1:22.39	(3 lengths)	Victor Espinoza	
Mar 12, 2022	1 1/16 miles	Azeri Stakes	II	Oaklawn Park	1.70	7	1	1:43.55	3/4 length	Victor Espinoza	
Apr 23, 2022	1 1/16 miles	Apple Blossom Handicap	I	Oaklawn Park	3.90	5	3	1:42.22	(1 3/4 lengths)	Victor Espinoza	
Jul 2, 2022	7 furlongs	Princess Rooney Stakes	II	Gulfstream Park	0.40*	6	1	1:22.20	6 1/2 lengths	Victor Espinoza	
Aug 27, 2022	7 furlongs	Ballerina Stakes	I	Saratoga	1.55*	7	5	1:21.40	(11 1/4 lengths)	Victor Espinoza	
Oct 2, 2022	6 1/2 furlongs	Chillingworth Stakes	III	Santa Anita	0.30*	5	1	1:16.36	2 1/4 lengths	Victor Espinoza	
Nov 5, 2022	7 furlongs	Breeders' Cup Filly & Mare Sprint	I	Keeneland	11.16	12	4	1:21.61	(5 lengths)	Victor Espinoza	

== Pedigree ==
Pedigree of Ce Ce, (2016)
Sire Elusive Quality (1993)	Gone West (1984)	Mr. Prospector (1970)	Raise a Native (1961)
Sire Elusive Quality (1993)	Gone West (1984)	Mr. Prospector (1970)	Gold Digger (1962)
Sire Elusive Quality (1993)	Gone West (1984)	Secrettame (1978)	Secretariat (1970)
Sire Elusive Quality (1993)	Gone West (1984)	Secrettame (1978)	Tamerett (1962)
Sire Elusive Quality (1993)	Touch of Greatness (1986)	Hero's Honor (1980)	Northern Dancer (CAN) (1961)
Sire Elusive Quality (1993)	Touch of Greatness (1986)	Hero's Honor (1980)	Glowing Tribute (1973)
Sire Elusive Quality (1993)	Touch of Greatness (1986)	Ivory Wand (1973)	Sir Ivor (1962)
Sire Elusive Quality (1993)	Touch of Greatness (1986)	Ivory Wand (1973)	Natashka (1962)
Dam Miss Houdini (2000)	Belong to Me (1989)	Danzig (1977)	Northern Dancer (CAN) (1961)
Dam Miss Houdini (2000)	Belong to Me (1989)	Danzig (1977)	Pas de Nom (1968)
Dam Miss Houdini (2000)	Belong to Me (1989)	Belonging (1979)	Exclusive Native (1965)
Dam Miss Houdini (2000)	Belong to Me (1989)	Belonging (1979)	Straight Deal (1962)
Dam Miss Houdini (2000)	Magical Maiden (1989)	Lord Avie (1978)	Lord Gaylord (1970)
Dam Miss Houdini (2000)	Magical Maiden (1989)	Lord Avie (1978)	Avie (1963)
Dam Miss Houdini (2000)	Magical Maiden (1989)	Gils Magic (1983)	Magesterial (1977)
Dam Miss Houdini (2000)	Magical Maiden (1989)	Gils Magic (1983)	Display Copy (1977) (family 12-c)
