= Torrey Pines =

A Torrey pine is a broad, open-crowned pine.

Torrey Pines can refer to:

- Torrey Pines, San Diego, a coastal community within San Diego, California, United States
- Torrey Pines State Natural Reserve
- Torrey Pines Golf Course, a municipal public golf course owned by the city of San Diego, California
- Torrey Pines Gliderport, a historic motorless flight facility in San Diego, California
- Torrey Pines High School, a high school in the North County Coastal area of San Diego, California
- Torrey Pines Stakes, a thoroughbred horse race at Del Mar Racetrack in Del Mar, California
- "Torrey Pines", a song by Your Heart Breaks
