= Ack Ack Handicap =

Ack Ack Handicap may refer to:

- Ack Ack Handicap (Churchill Downs), a horse race held at Churchill Downs
- Ack Ack Handicap (Hollywood Park), a horse race formerly held at Hollywood Park Racetrack
