= Chillingworth =

Chillingworth is a surname, and may refer to:

- Charles F. Chillingworth (1877–1967), Hawaiian lawyer and politician
- Charles F. Chillingworth Jr. (1903–1976), Hawaiian vice admiral
- Curtis Chillingworth (1896–1955), Florida attorney and state judge
- Daniel Chillingworth (born 1981), English football player
- David Chillingworth (born 1951), Scottish Anglican bishop
- Garry Chillingworth (born 1970), Australian cricketer
- Roger Chillingworth, character from Nathaniel Hawthorne's novel The Scarlet Letter (1850)
- Sonny Chillingworth (1932–1994), Hawaiian slack-key guitar player
- William Chillingworth (1602–1644), controversial English churchman

== See also ==
- Chillingworth Stakes, an American Thoroughbred horse race
