= San Diego Handicap =

- Class: Grade II
- Location: Del Mar Racetrack; Del Mar, California, United States
- Inaugurated: 1937
- Race type: Thoroughbred - Flat racing

Race information
- Distance: 1 1/16 miles (8.5 furlongs)
- Surface: Dirt
- Track: Left-handed
- Qualification: Three-years-old & up
- Weight: Assigned
- Purse: $200,000

The San Diego Handicap is an American Thoroughbred horse race held annually in late July/early August at the Del Mar Racetrack in Del Mar, California. This Grade II race is open to horses, age three and up, willing to race one and one-sixteenth miles on the dirt. It is considered the track's key prep race for its foremost attraction, the $1-million Pacific Classic Stakes.

Inaugurated in 1937, it was first run on July 3 as part of the first-ever racecard at Del Mar Racetrack. Since inception it has been contested at various distances:

- 6 furlongs : 1937, 1945, 1946, 1947
- 1 mile : 1941
- 1 1/8 miles : 1991-1993
- 1 1/16 miles : 1938, 1948–1990, 1994–present

The race was not run in 1939-1940 and from 1942 through 1944.

From 2007 to 2014, the race was run on a Polytrack artificial dirt surface.

== Records ==
Speed record: (at current distance of 1 1/16 miles)

- 1:40.00 - Windy Sands (1962)
- 1:40.00 - Native Diver (1965)

Most wins:

- 3 - Native Diver (1963, 1964, 1965)

Most wins by a jockey:

- 6 - Chris McCarron (1993, 1994, 1995, 1997, 1998, 1999)
- 6 - Victor Espinoza (2002, 2003, 2004, 2013, 2016, 2017)

Most wins by a trainer:

- 5 - Charlie Whittingham (1970, 1971, 1973, 1974, 1989)
- 5 - Robert J. Frankel (1976, 1982, 1999, 2000, 2001)
- 5 - John W. Sadler (2003, 2013, 2017, 2018, 2019)

Most wins by an owner:

- 3 - E. O. Stice & Sons (1945, 1948, 1949)
- 3 - M/M Louis K. Shapiro (1963, 1964, 1965)

== Winners ==
| Year | Winner | Age | Jockey | Trainer | Owner | Time<be> |
|---|---|---|---|---|---|---|
| 2026 | Journalism | 4 | Umberto Rispoli | Michael W. McCarthy | Bridlewood Farm, Don Alberto Stable, Eclipse Thoroughbred Partners, Elayne Stables 5 & Robert V. LaPenta, Derrick Smith, Mrs. John Magnier and Michael Tabor | 1:42.65 |
| 2025 | Nysos | 4 | Flavien Prat | Bob Baffert | Baoma Corp | 1:42.61 |
| 2024 | Dr. Venkman | 4 | Antonio Fresu | Mark Glatt | Agnew, Dan J., Bunch, Clint, Cohen, Mark L. and Hailey, James | 1:43.36 |
| 2023 | Senor Buscador | 5 | Geovanni Franco | Todd W. Fincher | Peacock Family Holdings LP | 1:42.54 |
| 2022 | Royal Ship | 6 | Mike E. Smith | Richard E. Mandella | Fox Hollow Racing LLC and Siena Farm LLC | 1:42.75 |
| 2021 | Express Train | 4 | Juan Hernandez | John Shirreffs | CRK Stable, LLC | 1:43.37 |
| 2020 | Maximum Security | 4 | Abel Cedillo | Bob Baffert | Mary E. & Gary L. West, Susan Magnier, Michael Tabor, Derrick Smith | 1:44.54 |
| 2019 | Catalina Cruiser | 5 | Joel Rosario | John W. Sadler | Hronis Racing LLC (Kosta & Pete Hronis) | 1:44.20 |
| 2018 | Catalina Cruiser | 4 | Drayden Van Dyke | John W. Sadler | Hronis Racing LLC (Kosta & Pete Hronis) | 1:42.95 |
| 2017 | Accelerate | 4 | Victor Espinoza | John W. Sadler | Hronis Racing LLC (Kosta & Pete Hronis) | 1:42.15 |
| 2016 | California Chrome | 5 | Victor Espinoza | Art Sherman | California Chrome, LLC | 1:40.84 |
| 2015 | Catch a Flight | 5 | Gary Stevens | Richard E. Mandella | Haras Santa Maria de Araras | 1:43.08 |
| 2014 | Fed Biz | 5 | Martin Garcia | Bob Baffert | Kaleem Shah/Fed Biz | 1:41.00 |
| 2013 | Kettle Corn | 6 | Victor Espinoza | John W. Sadler | C R K Stable | 1:41.83 |
| 2012 | Rail Trip | 7 | Jose Valdivia Jr. | Ronald W. Ellis | Jay Em Ess Stable (Samantha Siegel) | 1:43.14 |
| 2011 | Tres Borrachos | 6 | Rafael Bejarano | Martin F. Jones | George Hicker | 1:42.71 |
| 2010 | Dakota Phone | 5 | Joel Rosario | Jerry Hollendorfer | Hollendorfer/Todaro/Carver/Halo Farms | 1:43.55 |
| 2009 | Informed | 5 | Tyler Baze | Douglas F. O'Neill | Bob & Beverly Lewis Trust | 1:41.91 |
| 2008 | Well Armed | 5 | Aaron Gryder | Eoin G. Harty | WinStar Farm | 1:41.57 |
| 2007 | Sun Boat | 5 | Michael Baze | Mike R. Mitchell | Bongo Racing Stable | 1:45.39 |
| 2006 | Giacomo | 4 | Mike E. Smith | John Shirreffs | Ann & Jerry Moss | 1:42.15 |
| 2005 | Choctaw Nation | 5 | Victor Espinoza | Jeff Mullins | Robert D. Bone | 1:42.40 |
| 2004 | Choctaw Nation | 4 | Victor Espinoza | Jeff Mullins | Robert D. Bone | 1:42.32 |
| 2003 | Taste Of Paradise | 4 | Victor Espinoza | John W. Sadler | Abrahams & Bloom | 1:42.62 |
| 2002 | Grey Memo | 5 | Eddie Delahoussaye | Warren Stute | Manzani, Ridgeley Farm | 1:43.48 |
| 2001 | Skimming | 5 | Garrett Gomez | Robert J. Frankel | Juddmonte Farms | 1:41.62 |
| 2000 | Skimming | 4 | Garrett Gomez | Robert J. Frankel | Juddmonte Farms | 1:41.06 |
| 1999 | Mazel Trick | 4 | Chris McCarron | Robert J. Frankel | Jones & 3+U Stable | 1:40.60 |
| 1998 | Mud Route | 4 | Chris McCarron | Ron McAnally | Janis Whitham | 1:41.00 |
| 1997 | Northern Afleet | 4 | Chris McCarron | David E. Hofmans | Anderson & Waranch | 1:41.80 |
| 1996 | Savinio | 6 | Chris Antley | Walter Greenman | Biszantz/Greenman/Vandeweghe | 1:40.80 |
| 1995 | Blumin Affair | 4 | Chris McCarron | Jack Van Berg | Bowman & Vogel | 1:41.20 |
| 1994 | Kingdom Found | 4 | Chris McCarron | Gary F. Jones | Ray Dilbeck | 1:41.20 |
| 1993 | Fanatic Boy | 6 | Chris McCarron | Ron McAnally | Charles J. Cella | 1:48.40 |
| 1992 | Another Review | 4 | Laffit Pincay Jr. | Chris Speckert | Buckland Farm | 1:47.00 |
| 1991 | Twilight Agenda | 5 | Corey Nakatani | D. Wayne Lukas | Moyglare Stud | 1:47.60 |
| 1990 | Quiet American | 4 | Kent Desormeaux | Gary F. Jones | Sheikh Mohammed | 1:40.40 |
| 1989 | Lively One | 4 | Robbie Davis | Charlie Whittingham | John G. Sikura | 1:40.80 |
| 1988 | Cutlass Reality | 6 | Gary Stevens | Craig A. Lewis | H. Crash & J. Hankoff | 1:41.40 |
| 1987 | Super Diamond | 7 | Laffit Pincay Jr. | Edwin J. Gregson | Roland Sahm | 1:40.80 |
| 1986 | Skywalker | 4 | Laffit Pincay Jr. | Michael Whittingham | Oak Cliff Stable | 1:40.80 |
| 1985 | Super Diamond | 5 | Rafael Meza | Edwin J. Gregson | Roland Sahm | 1:41.40 |
| 1984 | Ancestral | 4 | Eddie Delahoussaye | Jerry M. Fanning | C. B. Singer | 1:41.20 |
| 1983 | Bates Motel | 4 | Terry Lipham | John Gosden | Jacqueline Getty & M. Riordan | 1:41.00 |
| 1982 | Wickerr | 7 | Eddie Delahoussaye | Robert J. Frankel | Edmund A. Gann | 1:41.40 |
| 1981 | Summer Time Guy | 5 | Sandy Hawley | Willard L. Proctor | William R. Hawn | 1:41.00 |
| 1980 | Island Sultan | 5 | Marco Castaneda | David E. Hofmans | David Ringler | 1:41.80 |
| 1979 | Always Gallant | 5 | Darrel McHargue | David La Croix | Joseph W. La Croix | 1:41.00 |
| 1978 | Vic's Magic | 5 | Fernando Toro | Randy Winick | M. & R. Harpenau | 1:40.20 |
| 1977 | Mark's Place | 5 | Bill Shoemaker | John G. Canty | Bob D. Bird | 1:40.60 |
| 1976 | Good Report † | 6 | Laffit Pincay Jr. | Robert J. Frankel | Dr. A. J. Chlad | 1:42.40 |
| 1975 | Chesapeake | 6 | Frank Olivares | T. F. Richardson | Mrs. C. J. Dorfman | 1:40.60 |
| 1974 | Matun | 5 | Bill Shoemaker | Charlie Whittingham | M. L. Everett | 1:41.00 |
| 1973 | Kennedy Road | 5 | Bill Shoemaker | Charlie Whittingham | Helen G. Stollery | 1:41.40 |
| 1972 | Figonero | 7 | Fernando Alvarez | Warren Stute | Clement L. Hirsch | 1:40.80 |
| 1971 | Advance Guard | 5 | Bill Shoemaker | Charlie Whittingham | Burt Bacharach | 1:41.00 |
| 1970 | T.V. Commercial | 5 | Donald Pierce | Charlie Whittingham | Bwamazon Farm | 1:41.40 |
| 1969 | Kissin' George † | 6 | William Mahorney | Buster Millerick | DeCourcy Graham | 1:41.40 |
| 1968 | Rivet | 4 | Miguel Yanez | Dale Landers | Pierce Doty | 1:40.80 |
| 1967 | French Fox | 5 | Dean Hall | Mort Lipton | Vicgray Farm | 1:41.60 |
| 1966 | Old Mose | 4 | Donald Pierce | Joe Manzi | Robert E. Hibbert | 1:41.40 |
| 1965 | Native Diver | 6 | Jerry Lambert | Buster Millerick | M/M Louis K. Shapiro | 1:40.00 |
| 1964 | Native Diver | 5 | Jerry Lambert | Buster Millerick | M/M Louis K. Shapiro | 1:41.20 |
| 1963 | Native Diver | 4 | Ralph Neves | Buster Millerick | M/M Louis K. Shapiro | 1:40.60 |
| 1962 | Windy Sands | 5 | Raymond York | Jack M. Phillips | Connie M. Ring | 1:40.00 |
| 1961 | New Policy | 4 | Robert Mundorf | John H. Adams | Ralph Lowe | 1:41.00 |
| 1960 | Eddie Schmidt | 7 | Alex Maese | Frank L. Carr | Elobee Farm | 1:41.20 |
| 1959 | Twentyone Guns | 4 | George Taniguchi | Fred M. Smith | M/M John Eyraud | 1:42.00 |
| 1958 | How Now | 5 | Willi Harmatz | Cecil Jolly | George C. Newell | 1:42.00 |
| 1957 | Eddie Schmidt | 4 | Ismael Valenzuela | Frank L. Carr | Elobee Farm | 1:42.00 |
| 1956 | Honeys Alibi | 4 | Raymond York | Willie F. Alvarado | W-L Ranch Co. | 1:41.40 |
| 1955 | Trigonometry | 4 | Rogelio Trejos | Howard Long | Owl Stable | 1:41.20 |
| 1954 | Stranglehold | 5 | Billy Pearson | Red McDaniel | N. Gordon Phillips | 1:41.80 |
| 1953 | Goose Khal | 4 | Bill Shoemaker | Willie F. Alvarado | Harry Brown | 1:42.80 |
| 1952 | Moonrush | 6 | Ralph Neves | Willie F. Alvarado | King & Luellwitz | 1:42.20 |
| 1951 | Blue Reading | 4 | Billy Pearson | Red McDaniel | M/M Clement L. Hirsch | 1:41.60 |
| 1950 | Manyunk | 5 | George Moore | Allen Drumheller Sr. | Foster & Collins | 1:42.40 |
| 1949 | Prevaricator | 6 | Mike Caffarella | Lyle Sechrest | E. O. Stice & Sons | 1:42.00 |
| 1948 | Prevaricator | 5 | Alan Gray | William Molter | E. O. Stice & Sons | 1:42.60 |
| 1947 | Ended | 8 | Jimmy Nichols | W. Robertson | W. Robertson | 1:11.00 |
| 1946 | Lovonsite | 3 | Nick Wall | L. Meirpol | Mildred Factor | 1:10.40 |
| 1945 | High Resolve | 4 | William Bailey | William Molter | E. O. Stice & Sons | 1:10.00 |
| 1941 | Step By | 6 | J. Robertson | W. Osborne | Fair Hill Stable | 1:37.20 |
| 1938 | King Saxon | 7 | John Adams | Richard F. Carman Jr. | Richard F. Carman Jr. | 1:45.20 |
| 1937 | Clean Out | 5 | D. Smith | William B. Finnegan | Vera S. Bragg | 1:12.00 |

- † In 1976, Mark's Place finished first but was disqualified and set back to last.
- † In 1969, TripleTux finished first but was disqualified and set back to fourth.
