= Chillingworth Stakes =

- Class: Grade III
- Location: Santa Anita Park; Arcadia, California, United States
- Inaugurated: 1986 (as Midwick Handicap)
- Race type: Thoroughbred – Flat racing – Dirt
- Website: www.santaanita.com

Race information
- Distance: 6 1/2 furlongs
- Surface: Dirt
- Track: Left-handed
- Qualification: Fillies and Mares, three years old and older
- Weight: Base weights with allowances: 4-year-olds and up: 126 lbs. 3-year-olds: 122 lbs.
- Purse: US$100,000 (since 2013)

The Chillingworth Stakes is a Grade III American Thoroughbred horse race for fillies and mares that are three years old or older, over a distance of 6 1/2 furlongs on the dirt track held annually in October at Santa Anita Park, Arcadia, California. The event currently carries a purse of $100,000.

== History ==
The race was inaugurated in 1986 as the Midwick Handicap and was over a distance of 1 mile on the turf and was held as part of the 1986 Breeders' Cup program at Santa Anita Park. The race was named after The Midwick Tract neighborhood was originally part of Midwick Country Club located today in Alhambra in Los Angeles County which is not far from Arcadia where the racetrack is located.

In 1989 the event was renamed to the Louis R. Rowan Handicap in honor of Louis R. Rowan who co-founded the Oak Tree Racing Association, which had held their fall meeting at Santa Anita Park as well as co-founder of the California Thoroughbred Foundation.

By the early 2000s the event became sporadically held. In 2000 the event was run over the Downhill turf course over the shorter distance of about 6 1/2 furlongs and with conditions for Californian bred entries. After an absence of two years the event was resumed earlier in the racing year on the dirt track over a distance of six furlongs as the Pine Tree Lane Stakes. In 2009 the event was reverted to the Louis R. Rowan Stakes with the 2010 running moved to Hollywood Park racetrack and held on the All Weather track.

With the end of Oak Tree holding their fall meeting in 2011 at Santa Anita Park, the administration of the track renamed the event to the current name L.A. Woman Stakes. In 2012 the event was renamed after the song L.A. Woman by the American rock band the Doors and written by Jim Morrison. The song later in 2014 was regarded by LA Weekly named it No. 1 on their list of "the 20 best songs about the city of Los Angeles".

In 2014 the event was upgraded to a Grade III event.

In 2020 the event was renamed to the Chillingworth Stakes in honor of Sherwood Chillingworth, the longtime director and executive vice president of the Oak Tree Racing Association.

== Records ==
Speed record:

- 6 1/2 furlongs on the dirt – 1:14.84 – Top Kisser (2014)
- 6 1/2 furlongs on the AWT – 1:14.07 – Theverythoughtof U (2007)
- 1 mile on the turf – 1:33.19 – Reluctant Guest (1991)

Margins:

- 4 1/2 lengths – Mother Ruth (2010)

Most wins

- 2 – Aberushka (1986, 1987)
- 2 - Ce Ce (2021, 2022)

Most wins by a jockey

- 3 – Mike E. Smith (2009, 2013, 2017)
- 3 – Gary L. Stevens (1987, 1990, 1994)

Most wins by a trainer

- 4 – Bob Baffert (2003, 2005, 2010, 2025)

Most wins by an owner

- 2 – Jerome & Ann Moss (1986, 1987)
- 2 - Bo Hirsch (2021, 2022)

== Winners ==
| Year | Winner | Age | Jockey | Trainer | Owner | Distance | Time | Purse | Grade | Ref |
|---|---|---|---|---|---|---|---|---|---|---|
At Santa Anita – Chillingworth Stakes
| 2026 | Our Moonlight | 4 | Tiago Josue Pereira | Dean Pederson | T. Lawrence Jett and Ann Jett | 6 1/2 furlongs | 1:16.36 | $100,000 | III | |
| 2025 | Silent Law (Note: In 2025 Tamara finished first, but was later disqualified by the national Horseracing Integrity & Welfare Unit due to a medication violation.) | 3 | Juan Hernandez | Bob Baffert | CSLR Racing Partners LLC | 6 1/2 furlongs | 1:15.21 | $100,000 | III | |
| 2024 | One Magic Philly | 3 | Antonio Fresu | Philip D'Amato | John Gallegos | 6 1/2 furlongs | 1:16.14 | $98,000 | III | |
| 2023 | Kirstenbosch | 4 | Hector Berrios | John W. Sadler | Keith Abrahams | 6 1/2 furlongs | 1:15.37 | $101,000 | III | |
| 2022 | Ce Ce | 6 | Victor Espinoza | Michael McCarthy | Bo Hirsch | 6 1/2 furlongs | 1:16.36 | $100,000 | III | |
| 2021 | Ce Ce | 5 | Victor Espinoza | Michael McCarthy | Bo Hirsch | 6 1/2 furlongs | 1:15.86 | $100,000 | III | |
| 2020 | Into Chocolate | 4 | Umberto Rispoli | Clifford Sise Jr. | Pam & Martin J. Wygod | 6 1/2 furlongs | 1:15.86 | $100,000 | III | |
L.A. Woman Stakes
| 2019 | Lady Ninja | 5 | Drayden Van Dyke | Richard Baltas | Harry Bederian, Harout Kamberian, Hagop Nakkashian & Richard Baltas | 6 1/2 furlongs | 1:16.79 | $100,000 | III | |
| 2018 | Skye Diamonds | 5 | Tiago Josue Pereira | William Spawr | Allen Racing, Bloom Racing Stables, Tom Acker & Jon Lindo | 6 1/2 furlongs | 1:16.56 | $100,000 | III | |
| 2017 | Unique Bella | 3 | Mike E. Smith | Jerry Hollendorfer | Don Alberto Stable | 6 1/2 furlongs | 1:16.66 | $100,345 | III | |
| 2016 | Gloryzapper | 4 | Stewart Elliott | Philip D'Amato | Hebert Bloodstock, Richard Leggio & Peter Peluso | 6 1/2 furlongs | 1:15.75 | $101,035 | III | |
| 2015 | Ben's Duchess | 3 | Joseph Talamo | John W. Sadler | Doubledown Stable | 6 1/2 furlongs | 1:15.79 | $100,000 | III | |
| 2014 | Top Kisser | 5 | Elvis Trujillo | Jerry Hollendorfer | Tommy Town Thoroughbred | 6 1/2 furlongs | 1:14.84 | $100,350 | III | |
| 2013 | Teddy's Promise | 5 | Victor Espinoza | Ronald W. Ellis | Ted & Judy Nichols | 6 1/2 furlongs | 1:15.28 | $100,000 | | |
| 2012 | Rumor | 4 | Mike E. Smith | Richard E. Mandella | Ramona Bass, Claiborne Farm & Adele Dilschneider | 6 1/2 furlongs | 1:17.47 | $98,000 | Listed | |
Louis R. Rowan Stakes
| 2011 | Home Sweet Aspen | 3 | Joel Rosario | John W. Sadler | Craig Family Trust | 6 1/2 furlongs | 1:15.00 | $67,490 | | |
At Hollywood Park
| 2010 | Mother Ruth | 4 | Martin Garcia | Bob Baffert | Zayat Stables | 6 1/2 furlongs | 1:16.27 | $58,400 | | |
At Santa Anita
| 2009 | Free Flying Soul | 4 | Mike E. Smith | Bruce Headley | Marsha Naify | 6 1/2 furlongs | 1:15.26 | $70,810 | | |
Pine Tree Lane Stakes
| 2008 | Tizzy's Tune | 5 | Alex O. Solis | Ronald McAnally | Arnold Zetcher | 6 1/2 furlongs | 1:14.45 | $72,990 | | |
| 2007 | Theverythoughtof U | 4 | Joseph Talamo | Ronald W. Ellis | Jay Em Ess Stable | 6 1/2 furlongs | 1:14.07 | $57,300 | | |
| 2006 | Selvatica | 5 | Aaron Gryder | Jeff Mullins | Granja Vista Del Rio Stable | 6 1/2 furlongs | 1:15.57 | $57,080 | | |
| 2005 | Resplendency | 4 | Victor Espinoza | Bob Baffert | Robert B. Lewis & Beverly J. Lewis | 6 1/2 furlongs | 1:14.90 | $67,990 | | |
| 2004 | Race not held | | | | | | | | | |
| 2003 (Note: In 2003 the conditions of the event were for fillies and mares that were four years old and older since it was not run during the Oak Tree Racing Association meeting in the fall.) | Shameful | 4 | David R. Flores | Bob Baffert | Hal J. Earnhardt III | 6 furlongs | 1:10.31 | $78,650 | Listed | |
| 2002 | Race not held | | | | | | | | | |
| 2001 | Race not held | | | | | | | | | |
Louis R. Rowan California Cup Distaff Handicap
| 2000 (Note: In 2000 the conditions of the event were for Californian bred fillies and mares that were three years old and older. The event was run on the Downhill turf course and was run under the name Louis R. Rowan California Cup Distaff Handicap.) | Chichim | 5 | Laffit Pincay Jr. | Juan Garcia | Marianne Millard | abt. 6 1/2 furlongs | 1:13.49 | $150,000 | | |
| 1999 | Race not held | | | | | | | | | |
Louis R. Rowan Handicap
| 1998 | Green Jewel (GB) | 4 | Eddie Delahoussaye | David E. Hofmans | Laura A. Recachina | 1 mile | 1:39.52 | $100,000 | III | |
| 1997 | Race not held | | | | | | | | | |
| 1996 | Two Ninety Jones | 5 | René R. Douglas | Melvin F. Stute | James W. Hirschmann III | 1 mile | 1:34.14 | $107,100 | Listed | |
| 1995 | Real Connection | 4 | René R. Douglas | Melvin F. Stute | Bill M. Thomas | 1 mile | 1:36.89 | $106,600 | Listed | |
| 1994 | Magical Maiden | 5 | Gary L. Stevens | Warren Stute | Clement L. Hirsch | 1 mile | 1:36.17 | $83,550 | Listed | |
| 1993 | Miss Turkana | 4 | Antonio Lopez Castanon | Gary F. Jones | Fawn Leap Farm | 1 mile | 1:34.88 | $84,400 | Listed | |
| 1992 | Visible Gold | 4 | Laffit Pincay Jr. | J. Paco Gonzalez | McCaffery & Toffa | 1 mile | 1:34.64 | $81,600 | Listed | |
| 1991 | Reluctant Guest | 5 | Chris McCarron | Richard E. Mandella | Robert S Folson | 1 mile | 1:33.19 | $87,000 | Listed | |
| 1990 | Oeilladine (FR) | 4 | Gary L. Stevens | Jude T. Feld | Michael House | 1 mile | 1:34.20 | $113,100 | Listed | |
| 1989 | Baba Cool (IRE) | 4 | Laffit Pincay Jr. | Michael C. Whittingham | Evergreen Farm | 1 mile | 1:33.40 | $111,500 | Listed | |
Midwick Handicap
| 1988 | Balbonella (FR) | 4 | Eddie Delahoussaye | Neil D. Drysdale | Sheikh Maktoum bin Rashid al Maktoum | 1 mile | 1:34.80 | $112,600 | Listed | |
| 1987 (Note: In 1987 the event was split into two divisions.) | Mausie (ARG) | 5 | Gary L. Stevens | Gary Jones | de Burgh & Lima | 1 mile | 1:37.20 | $65,400 | Listed | Division 1 |
| 1987 | Aberuschka (IRE) | 5 | Patrick Valenzuela | Robert Frankel | Mr. & Mrs. J.S. Moss | 1 mile | 1:38.40 | $63,700 | Listed | Division 2 |
| 1986 | Aberuschka (IRE) | 4 | Patrick Valenzuela | Robert Frankel | Mr. & Mrs. J.S. Moss | 1 mile | 1:36.60 | $118,250 | | |

Legend:
All Weather Track Dirt Turf

== See also ==
List of American and Canadian Graded races
