= Noble Threewitt =

American racehorse trainer

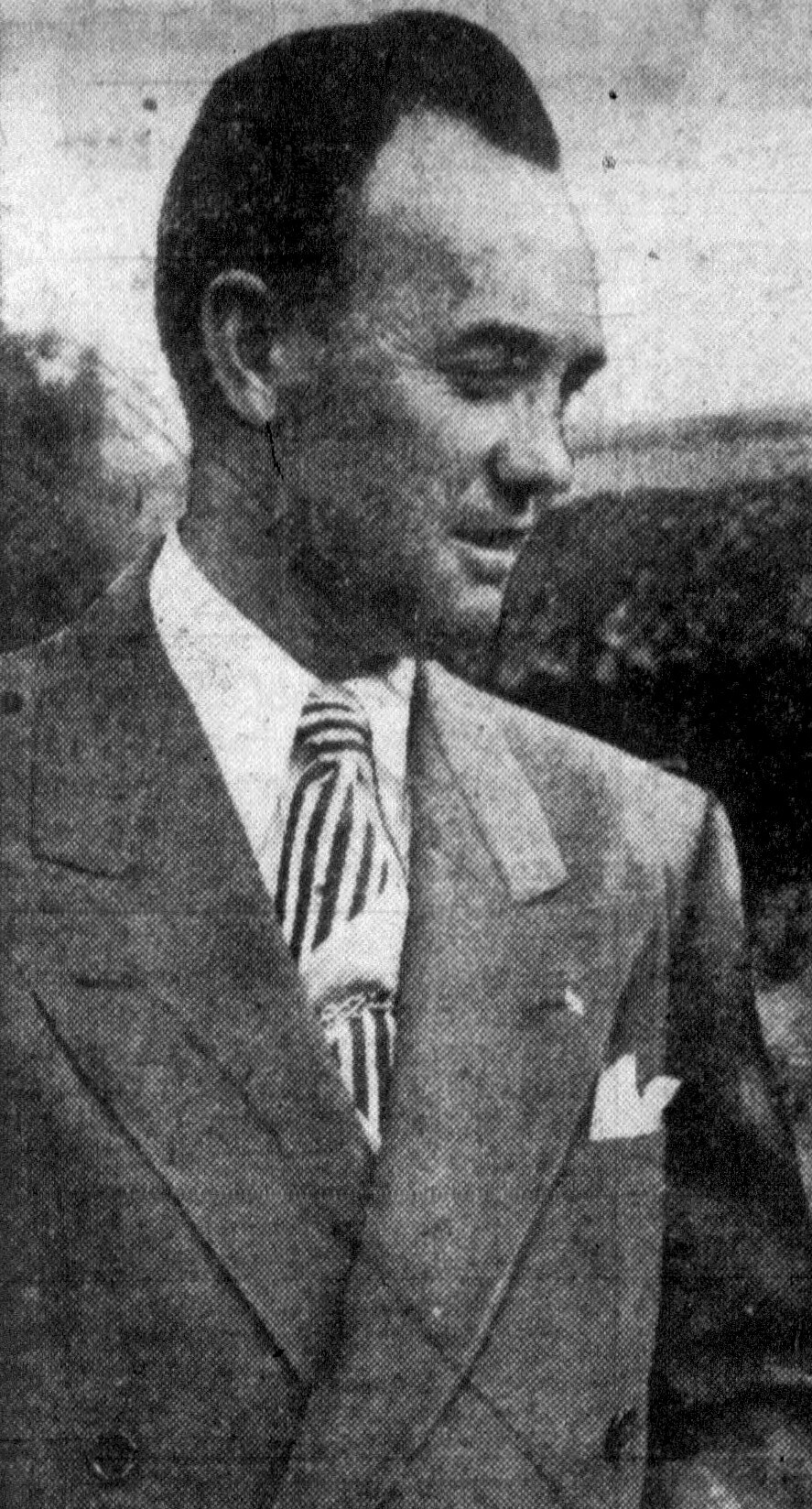
- Threewitt, circa 1949

Personal information
- Born: February 24, 1911 Benton, Illinois, U.S.
- Died: September 17, 2010 (aged 99); West Covina, California, U.S.
- Occupation: Trainer

Horse racing career
- Sport: Horse racing
- Career wins: 2,038

Major racing wins
- Santa Margarita Handicap (1954); Wood Memorial Stakes (1954); Florida Derby (1954); John C. Mabee Handicap (1960, 1965); Del Mar Oaks (1963); Malibu Stakes (1971); Palos Verdes Handicap (1971, 1984); San Luis Rey Handicap (1971); California Derby (1977); Baldwin Stakes (1984); El Conejo Handicap (1985); San Carlos Handicap (1985); San Pasqual Handicap (1985); San Rafael Stakes (1993); Swaps Stakes (1993); Best Pal Stakes (1997); Pat O'Brien Handicap (1998); Desert Stormer Handicap (2000)

Racing awards
- Hollywood Park leading trainer (1959, 1960, 1961); Golden Gate Fields leading trainer (1970); Laffit Pincay Jr. Award (2005)

Honours
- Noble Threewitt Health Center at Santa Anita Park

Significant horses
- Correlation, King of Cricket, Old Topper
- Updated on August 28, 2007

Noble Winfield Threewitt (February 24, 1911 – September 17, 2010) was an American Thoroughbred racehorse trainer who conditioned horses for 75 years before retiring on his 96th birthday. The city of Arcadia, California, home to Santa Anita Racetrack, declared February 24, 2007, to be "Noble Threewitt Day."

Born in Benton, Illinois, Threewitt grew up in a small town where his father worked as a bookkeeper for a coal company. Introduced to horse racing at county fairgrounds, in his teens he rode in a few races in Kansas City but soon weight gain ended his days as a jockey. In 1932, he embarked on a career as a professional trainer at Agua Caliente Racetrack in Tijuana, Mexico. At age 21, he was the youngest licensed American trainer at that time. At Agua Caliente Racetrack, Threewitt saddled his first winner in 1932 and was on hand when the great Australian champion Phar Lap came that year to win the Agua Caliente Handicap.

A year after Noble Threewitt became a trainer, he met and married Beryl Buck, the daughter of fellow trainer, William D. Buck. When Santa Anita Park was built in Arcadia, California, Threewitt was there for the opening day in 1934. He would also be on hand to witness the opening of four other major California racetracks: Hollywood Park (1938), Del Mar Racetrack (1937), Bay Meadows Racetrack (1934) and Golden Gate Fields (1941) as well as for the opening of Longacres Racetrack and Emerald Downs in the state of Washington.

A permanent fixture in California racing, except for a few years in the 1930s when he trained in New York for John D. Hertz, Threewitt won training titles at Hollywood Park in 1959, 1960 and 1961 and at Golden Gate Fields in 1970. In April 1954, he won with nine consecutive starters at Tanforan Racetrack in San Bruno, California.

The best horse Noble Threewitt conditioned was Correlation with which he won the 1954 Florida Derby and Wood Memorial Stakes. The betting favorite in the Kentucky Derby, in what Churchill Downs describes as one of the roughest Derbys ever run, the colt finished sixth to winner Determine then earned a second-place result behind Hasty Road in the Preakness Stakes.

On April 22, 2006, at age 95, Noble Threewitt became the oldest trainer to win a race in North America when Threeatonce, owned by grandson Chris Chinnici, won a maiden claiming race at Santa Anita Park. On his February 24, 2007 birthday, Threewitt officially retired as a trainer having won more than 2,000 races.

A long-time friend of trainer Charlie Whittingham, Hollywood Park Racetrack in 1993 named its new Horsemen's Lounge in their honor.

== Humanitarian work ==
While working as a trainer, Noble Threewitt also devoted a great deal of time to helping others in the racing industry. Trainer Warren Stute told reporter Julie Sarno of the Del Mar Times newspaper that "Noble [Threewitt] has done more for the grooms and backstretch workers than all of us put together."

Profoundly affected by the separation of his parents while still a young boy, he has always empathized with those in need. He served six terms as president of the California Horsemen's Benevolent Association whose functions include the providing of free medical and dental benefits for stable workers and their families at a Santa Anita clinic. In 2004, Santa Anita Park renamed its backstretch medical facility the Noble Threewitt Health Center.

In 2005, Noble Threewitt was the recipient of Hollywood Park's Laffit Pincay Jr. Award, given annually to someone who has served the sport of Thoroughbred racing with integrity, extraordinary dedication, determination, and distinction.

Residents of Covina, California, Noble and Beryl Threewitt celebrated their seventy-seventh year of marriage in 2010. Beryl died on July 12, 2010, at age 98. Noble died two months later at an assisted living facility in West Covina, California.
