= Philip Cheng =

Hong Kong jockey (1980–2000)

Philip Cheng Cheong-tat (Chinese: 鄭昌達; Jyutping: zeng^{6} coeng^{1} daat^{6}; March 28, 1980 – September 26, 2000), was one of the most promising apprentice jockeys from Hong Kong in recent years. He had 28 winners in his short career and was second among apprentices with 16 wins in the 1999–2000 season.

In the summer of 2000, Cheng spent the summer in Great Britain for trainer Gary Moore, and finished second in an apprentices' race at Epsom.

On September 23, 2000, he was kicked in the head and chest area by his mount My Fourth Wishes after it had stumbled, succumbing to his injuries in hospital three days later.

Cheng's death was the second in the Hong Kong racing scene in 19 months, following Willy Kan's death in March 1999.

Cheng's died aged 20 as a result of injuries he sustained in a fall in a race at Sha Tin Racecourse. The nature of his injuries were not disclosed. His organs were donated to 5 people.
