= Hard Not to Love =

American thoroughbred racehorse

- Sire: Hard Spun
- Grandsire: Danzig
- Dam: Loving Vindication
- Damsire: Vindication
- Sex: Filly
- Foaled: 2016
- Country: Canada
- Breeder: Anderson Farms Ont. Inc.
- Owner: Mercedes Stables LLC, West Point Thoroughbreds, Scott Dilworth, Dorothy Ingordo, David Ingordo, F. Steve Mooney
- Trainer: John Shirreffs
- Record: 8:5-2-1
- Earnings: $528,480

Major wins
- La Brea Stakes (2019); Santa Monica Stakes (2020)

Hard Not to Love (foaled May 11th, 2016) is a Canadian Thoroughbred racehorse and the winner of the 2019 La Brea Stakes.

== Career ==
Hard Not to Love's first race was on February 16, 2019, at Santa Anita, where she came in first in a Maiden Special Weight Race. The horse then got her second straight win two months later in an April 13, 2019, Allowance Optional Claiming race.

On May 4, 2019, she competed in the listed $75,000 Angels Flight Stakes. She was seen as the second favorite at 9:5 odds behind the 8:5 horse, Sneaking Out. She ended up finishing in 2nd after the original winner, Sneaking Out was disqualified for bumping My Miss Rose.

She picked up another win in an October 25, 2019, Allowance Optional Claiming race at Santa Anita Park, and then won her first stakes race - the Grade-1 La Brea Stakes. She came in as the 11:1 underdog and defeated the 3:5 favorite Bellafina by 2 1/4th lengths. The win netted Hard Not to Love $301,404.

On February 15, 2020, she started out her 2020 season with another stakes win. This time, she won the won Grade-2 2020 Santa Monica Stakes. She came in as the 3:5 favorite and delivered, giving her 5 wins in 6 starts.

On March 14, 2020, she competed in the Grade-1 Beholder Mile Stakes. She came in as the 3:5 favorite but was beaten by 3 1/4th lengths by Ce Ce.

On May 31, 2020, she competed in the Grade-2 Santa Maria Stakes. she came in as the 2:1 second favorite but was defeated, along with Ce Ce by 10:1 longshot Fighting Mad by 3 1/4th lengths.

== Pedigree ==
Pedigree of Hard Not to Love (USA), 2016
Sire Hard Spun (USA) b. 2004	Danzig (USA) b. 1997	Northern Dancer	Nearctic
Sire Hard Spun (USA) b. 2004	Danzig (USA) b. 1997	Northern Dancer	Natalma
Sire Hard Spun (USA) b. 2004	Danzig (USA) b. 1997	Pas de Nom	Admiral's Voyage
Sire Hard Spun (USA) b. 2004	Danzig (USA) b. 1997	Pas de Nom	Petitioner
Sire Hard Spun (USA) b. 2004	Turkish Tryst (USA) b. 1991	Turkoman	Alydar
Sire Hard Spun (USA) b. 2004	Turkish Tryst (USA) b. 1991	Turkoman	Taba
Sire Hard Spun (USA) b. 2004	Turkish Tryst (USA) b. 1991	Darbyvail	Roberto
Sire Hard Spun (USA) b. 2004	Turkish Tryst (USA) b. 1991	Darbyvail	Luiana
Dam Loving Vindication (USA) b. 2005	Vindication (USA) b. 2000	Seattle Slew	Bold Reasoning
Dam Loving Vindication (USA) b. 2005	Vindication (USA) b. 2000	Seattle Slew	My Charmer
Dam Loving Vindication (USA) b. 2005	Vindication (USA) b. 2000	Strawberry Reason	Strawberry Road
Dam Loving Vindication (USA) b. 2005	Vindication (USA) b. 2000	Strawberry Reason	Pretty Reason
Dam Loving Vindication (USA) b. 2005	Chimichurri (USA) b. 2000	Elusive Quality	Gone West
Dam Loving Vindication (USA) b. 2005	Chimichurri (USA) b. 2000	Elusive Quality	Touch of Greatness
Dam Loving Vindication (USA) b. 2005	Chimichurri (USA) b. 2000	Hard Knocker	Raja Baba
Dam Loving Vindication (USA) b. 2005	Chimichurri (USA) b. 2000	Hard Knocker	Homespun
