= Laffit Pincay Jr. Award =

The Laffit Pincay Jr. Award is an honor given annually since 2004 by Hollywood Park Racetrack in Inglewood, California to someone who has served the horse racing industry with integrity, dedication, determination and distinction. Named for retired U.S. Racing Hall of Fame jockey Laffit Pincay, Jr., the award, designed by American sculptor Nina Kaiser, is presented on Hollywood Gold Cup Day, a racecard that features the premier race Pincay won a record nine times.

When Hollywood Park closed the award was moved to Del Mar Racetrack in 2014.

== Winners of the Laffit Pincay Jr. Award ==
- 2025 : Mike Pegram
- 2024 : Richard Mandella
- 2023 : Trevor Denman
- 2022 : Ron McAnally
- 2021 : Gregory Ferraro
- 2020 : none
- 2019 : Julie Krone
- 2018 : Martine Bellocq
- 2017 : Mike E. Smith Hall of Fame Jockey
- 2016 : Chris McCarron Hall of Fame Jockey
- 2015 : Victor Espinoza Hall of Fame Jockey
- 2014 : Art Sherman Thoroughbred Horse Trainer
- 2013 : Eddie Delahoussaye Hall of Fame Jockey
- 2012 : John Harris
- 2011 : Jerry & Ann Moss, longtime owners, own Zenyatta
- 2010 : Oak Tree Racing Association
- 2009 : Merlin Volzke, jockey
- 2008 : Pete Pedersen, longtime California race steward
- 2007 : Ellwood W. "Bud" Johnston — Director and president of the California Thoroughbred Breeders Association for 25 years. He is the owner of Old English Rancho, breeders of more than 200 stakes winners and the leading North American breeder in 1971 and 1972
- 2006 : Mel and Warren Stute — Brothers who are longtime Thoroughbred horse trainers
- 2005 : Noble Threewitt — Thoroughbred trainer and humanitarian who trained for 75 years and who at age 95 became the oldest trainer to win a race in North America.
- 2004 : Bob Benoit — Employee and executive with Hollywood Park Racetrack for more than fifty years
