= Figonero =

Argentine-bred Thoroughbred racehorse

- Sire: Idle Hour
- Grandsire: Persian Gulf
- Dam: Fine Feathers
- Damsire: Pardal
- Sex: Stallion
- Foaled: 1965
- Country: United States
- Colour: Chestnut
- Breeder: Haras Argentino
- Owner: Clement L. Hirsch
- Trainer: Warren Stute
- Record: 68: 11-13-12
- Earnings: US$463,450 + 7,090,000 ARS

Major wins
- Gran Premio San Isidro (1968); Hollywood Gold Cup (1969); American Handicap (1969); Del Mar Handicap (1969); Sacramento Handicap (1970); San Francisco Mile Handicap (1971); San Diego Handicap (1972)

Figonero (foaled 1965 in Argentina) was a Thoroughbred racehorse who is best known for racing in the United States, where he set a world record for 1 1/8 miles in winning the 1969 Del Mar Handicap at Del Mar Racetrack in California.

== Racing career ==
In October 1968, the three-year-old Figonero won the Gran Premio San Isidro at the Hipódromo de San Isidro in San Isidro, Buenos Aires. He was purchased from his Argentine owners in 1969 by Clement L. Hirsch, co-founder and owner of California's Oak Tree Racing Association. The horse immediately made a winning debut in the prestigious Hollywood Gold Cup for his new American trainer, Warren Stute. He was ridden to victory by jockey Álvaro Pineda who would be aboard Figonero for his world record win that same year.

Figonero raced in the United States for four years into age eight before being retired to stud.

== Stud record ==
Figonero met with limited success as a sire.
