= Cool and Lam =

Fictional private detective firm

First edition dust jacket of The Bigger They Come (1939), the first mystery in the Cool and Lam series

Cool and Lam is a fictional American private detective firm that is the center of a series of thirty detective novels written by Erle Stanley Gardner (creator of "Perry Mason") using the pen name of A. A. Fair.

== Bertha Cool ==
In the first book about her, The Bigger They Come (1939; British: Lam to the Slaughter), Bertha Cool opened her detective agency after the death of Henry, her husband, in 1936. Her age is given as "somewhere in the sixties" in the first book; in Some Women Can't Wait (1953), she is "about fifty years old", and, in Beware the Curves (1956), she is "in the late fifties or early sixties." She is described in various terms as overweight, and uncaring about her weight—in the first novel, Donald Lam estimates her weight at 220 pounds (16 st; 100 kg). At the beginning of Spill the Jackpot (1941), she had flu and pneumonia, and lost a great deal of weight, down to 160 pounds (11 st; 73 kg), and in many later novels, her weight is given as 165 pounds (12 st; 75 kg). She has white hair and "greedy piggish eyes". All the novels agree that she is extremely avaricious and miserly. However, she has persistence, loyalty, and nerve. Her favorite expletive is some variant of "Fry me for an oyster!" or "Can me for a sardine!". In the opening chapter of the first novel, she hires a small, nervy, and extremely ingenious former lawyer named Donald Lam. Donald later becomes a full partner in her business, forming the agency, Cool and Lam, which features in more than two dozen books by Gardner.

== Donald Lam ==
In her biography of Gardner, Dorothy B. Hughes wrote, "Erle said over and again that if Donald Lam, 'that cocky little bastard,' had a model, it was Corney"—Thomas Cornwell Jackson, his literary agent. Jackson later married actress Gail Patrick, and they formed a partnership with Gardner that created the CBS-TV series Perry Mason.

Donald Lam begins his adventures as the employee of Bertha Cool. As a detective, Lam is in stark contrast to the fictional hard-boiled types of his era. Donald is about 5 ft 6 in (1.68 m), weighs 130 pounds (9 st; 59 kg) soaking wet, and gets beaten up quite frequently. While he does get into several fistfights, he loses all but one — a single fistfight against an insurance investigator in Double or Quits, only after taking boxing lessons from a former pug named Louie Hazen in Spill the Jackpot, and studying jujitsu with a master named Hashita in Gold Comes in Bricks.

== Works ==
The Cool and Lam series consists of the following 30 books, including an unpublished work discovered in 2016.

1. The Bigger They Come (1939)
  William Morrow and Company, January 1939
  Donald Lam is hired by Bertha. His first assignment is to serve a subpoena on a man that nobody can find. This first entry in the series turned on a real loophole in the extradition laws of the State of Arizona which made it possible, under certain conditions, to commit a murder without being punished provided one remained in Arizona. After its publication, a public outcry caused the Arizona Legislature to convene in special session to plug the loophole. Gardner had used this device earlier in his 'Ed Jenkins' stories, locating the loophole in California law (this time, fictitiously) so that Jenkins (though a known crook) could operate in California without being extradited for crimes in other states. The Cool and Lam stories were written under the pen name "A.A. Fair", and Gardner's authorship was not revealed till the 1940s.
2. Turn on the Heat (1940)
  William Morrow and Company, January 1940
  Dr. "Smith" is looking for his wife who left him 20 years before. It was made into a 1958 TV pilot for an unproduced show called Cool and Lam.
3. Gold Comes in Bricks (1940)
  William Morrow and Company, September 1940
  A blackmailing gambler, a corrupt lawyer, and an expert in salting gold mines, all are grist to Donald's mill.
4. Spill the Jackpot! (1941)
  William Morrow and Company, March 1941
  Set in Las Vegas. A runaway bride and a slot machine-fixing ring seem to have no connection. Bertha loses the weight, and falls in love! But...
5. Double or Quits (1941)
  William Morrow and Company, December 1941
  Detectionary: "First—the missing jewelry. Second—the client found dead in his garage, and Cool and Lam are trying to get from an insurance company double indemnity for the lovely widow." Bertha begins fishing.
6. Owls Don't Blink (1942)
  William Morrow and Company, June 1942
  Donald has two intertwining cases: finding a lost girl and bringing to justice a murderer. Set in the French Quarter of New Orleans. America has entered the war, and Bertha thinks she has helped gain Donald's immunity from the draft.
7. Bats Fly at Dusk (1942)
  William Morrow and Company, September 1942
  Donald has calmly volunteered for the Navy to fight the Japanese, and Bertha fumes. She works on a case involving a blind man and a pet bat, with help from Donald via telegram. Donald's frenemy—Police Detective Frank Sellers—is introduced. Bertha gets in over her head and quits; Donald flies down on a military pass, solves it, and flies back. Bertha only finds out later.
8. Cats Prowl at Night (1943)
  William Morrow and Company, August 1943
  Bertha must locate a client's missing wife, who controls all his money. No signs of Lam are seen at all, though he is heard of. She manages somehow, but almost fails. Frank proposes to her.
9. Give 'em the Ax (1944)
  William Morrow and Company, September 1944
  Donald returns, and takes control of the agency. The case is of a wife cheated with car insurance and blackmail.
10. Crows Can't Count (1946)
  William Morrow and Company, April 1946
  A case involving both stolen and smuggled emeralds, the latter half of which is set in the nation of Colombia.
11. Fools Die on Friday (1947)
  William Morrow and Company, September 1947
  Donald Lam tries to put "psychological handcuffs" on a potential poisoner, but things do not work out the way he planned. Raymond Chandler (now presumably aware of the true identity of A.A. Fair) wrote to Gardner in 1948, "Fools Die on Friday is about the best of the series since the first two. Perhaps since the very first."
12. Bedrooms Have Windows (1949)
  William Morrow and Company, January 1949
  Case involving "a pocket edition Venus", in which Donald himself is suspected by the police of a serious crime. Sleazy nightspots, dubious photographs, a stay at an auto court goes wrong—could there be blackmail?
13. Top of the Heap (1952)
  William Morrow and Company, February 1952
  Previously, Bertha has complained that Donald had been getting the agency in over its head lately. Donald then promptly shows the agency was used as a cat's paw to prove a phony alibi, in a case involving gangsters, gambling houses, Point shaving, a former stripper, a money laundering scam, and phantom gold mines. Bertha is mad enough to try and dissolve the partnership.
14. Some Women Won't Wait (1953)
  William Morrow and Company, September 1953
  The question is: did Donald's client poison her rich and decrepit husband, or didn't she? Set in Hawaii. Bertha tries to dance the hula.
15. Beware the Curves (1956)
  William Morrow and Company, November 1956
  Suspect in the murder is trying to figure out if it is safe for him to return to his beloved six years later. The victim was her husband who had sent the suspect to die in Amazonia to marry her.
16. You Can Die Laughing (1957)
  William Morrow and Company, March 1957
  Donald clashes with a client, with whom he has a written contract to locate a certain woman. He thinks the client is lying to him, but takes the case.
17. Some Slips Don't Show (1957)
  William Morrow and Company, October 1957
  Set in San Francisco and environs. Practically everyone ends up on a plane at one point or another, so almost anyone could have caused that guy to be found dead in his motel room. Donald knows it wasn't him. The worry is: do the police know that? Fancy footwork with fake keys and real claim checks could help.
18. The Count of Nine (1958)
  William Morrow and Company, June 1958
  A rich dilettante "explorer" finds his poisonous blow gun he had brought back from the Amazon used for a murder. Or so it seems … Gardner re-uses a recurring trick from his Perry Mason series: juggling duplicate bits of evidence. Instead of guns or bullets, Lam has a set of twin jade Buddhas with a ruby in the forehead. Secondly, the key plot point has a resemblance to G. K. Chesterton's Father Brown story, The Arrow of Heaven.
19. Pass the Gravy (1959)
  William Morrow and Company, February 1959
  What are the legal issues surrounding the exact way the assets of a spendthrift trust are to be distributed? And what are the exact legal circumstances surrounding the death of a man with a double indemnity policy on his life? If he is dead.
20. Kept Women Can't Quit (1960)
  William Morrow and Company, September 1960
  An armored car is robbed while one of the two guards are inside having donuts and coffee and ogling the waitresses; and when Police Detective Sgt. Frank Sellers catches one of the robbers, he is accused of pocketing the loot for himself. Sellers puts the pressure on Donald to solve the case for him, gratis, and get him off the hook. Much money floats about – in fact, a little too much. Whose?
21. Bachelors Get Lonely (1961)
  William Morrow and Company, March 1961
  Industrial espionage, a Peeping Tom, little is what it seems. More than one woman falls for Lam in the course of this investigation, due to his habit of playing square and treating them like human beings. Sgt. Sellers is a little dense at first, taking Lam for the Peeping Tom. The investigation moves to Arizona at one point.
22. Shills Can't Cash Chips (1961)
  William Morrow and Company, November 1961
  Bertha lands a nice, respectable insurance adjustment claim, and hands it to Donald. Donald uncovers assorted ulterior motives, pretends to be an ex-con, hot-wires his own car to impress a gorgeous witness and gets leaned on by a gangster. Then one of the parties involved ends up dead.
23. Try Anything Once (1962)
  William Morrow and Company, April 1962
  A worried heel of a husband is hand-wringingly anxious to keep his late night visit to a motel with a cocktail hostess quiet. Unfortunately for him, the deputy D.A. in a hot murder trial was found dead in the motel pool the same evening. The resulting investigation will expose the husband. Donald smells a rat lurking within this story, but finally accepts the fat fee offered to keep Bertha happy. The attempt to protect the client has unexpected side effects, including several women removing their garments for one reason or other, a horrifically false accusation against the straight-shooting Donald and the exciting courtroom climax he engineers in the above-mentioned trial.
24. Fish or Cut Bait (1963)
  William Morrow and Company, April 1963
  When Cool and Lam are hired for day-and-night coverage of a harassed woman, a tortuous tale involving a high-class 'escort service' unfolds. Donald is dismissed from the case, but inserts himself back in self-defence after the madam comes to an untimely end. He must convince the police it wasn't him.
25. Up for Grabs (1964)
  William Morrow and Company, March 1964
  Insurance again, this time a company that wants to set up an ongoing project to expose phony whiplash claims. Big ongoing retainer, big fees for each claim - Bertha's eyes glitter at all the legit dollars up for grabs. Donald is packed off to a dude ranch in Arizona to investigate the plaintiff in the first claim, with stern instructions not to stir this one up. It's not his fault someone's wife ends up dead in the Sierras, or that Sgt. Sellers is so annoyed at his 'amateur' interference that he throws away a key piece of evidence at the scene of the death.
26. Cut Thin to Win (1965)
  William Morrow and Company, April 1965
  The blurb on the back of the 1966 Pocket Books edition has Lam himself review the case: "Bertha has her doubts about taking a certain case, "...but I talked her into it when our client laid twelve one-hundred dollar bills on his desk. 'Fry me for an oyster', Bertha said. 'It's your baby, and you can change the diapers'. Less than a week later, Sgt. Frank Sellers announced he was going to take away my license, Bertha Cool announced that our partnership was dissolved and my secretary was crying on my shoulder. 'Donald, please - please be careful'. 'It's too late to be careful now' I told her. 'I'm dealing either with a crooked lawyer, a jealous boyfriend, a scheming daughter, one hell of a wealthy father or a combination of any number of them. When you go up against a combination of that sort, you can't be careful'".
27. Widows Wear Weeds (1966)
  William Morrow and Company, May 1966
  Donald Lam is hired to retrieve blackmail photos from a blackmailer, Nicholas Baffin, but instead gets framed for Baffin's murder when Baffin is found dead shortly after their meeting
28. Traps Need Fresh Bait (1967)
  William Morrow and Company, March 1967
  Someone is advertising for a witness to an auto accident in such a way as to seem to be suborning perjury. Also, an earlier claim was settled with evidence obtained in this way. The client wants Cool and Lam to find out what is back of it all. Gardner kept up with the law, and knew of the implications of the recent Miranda Rights decision of the Supreme Court for gathering evidence. He believed he had found a loophole allowing evidence improperly gathered under the new rules to be admissible, if obtained investigating another incident, such as a private detective searching a flat without permission. When Donald introduces the loophole, it brightens up Sgt. Sellers’ day no end.
29. All Grass isn't Green (1970)
  William Morrow and Company, March 1970
  Dope smuggling and a witness who is both more, and less, than he seems. It all starts when a client wants to find a missing writer – just to talk to him. A little digging (with descriptions of tracing techniques) shows his girlfriend has vanished too, and the trail goes south, to the Mexican border. Crossing the trail, going north, is a shipment of cannabis. Unsurprisingly for this business, someone ends up dead and the whole thing lands in court. Sorting out who did what and why taxes even Donald Lam's talents to the limit. Lam shows his considerable ability in courtroom maneuvering, which reminds the reader that he was a lawyer once.
30. The Knife Slipped (1939)
  Hard Case Crime, December 2016
  Originally written to be the second book in the Cool and Lam series but rejected by Gardner's publisher, The Knife Slipped was found among Gardner's papers at the University of Texas Austin by author Jeffrey Marks and published for the first time in 2016. Assigned to prove a philandering husband's infidelity, Donald Lam uncovers a scheme to enable a certain type of municipal corruption. As well as a dead body.

== Adaptations ==
=== Radio ===
Turn On the Heat was adapted by Welbourne Kelley for the June 23, 1946, broadcast of The United States Steel Hour on ABC radio. Frank Sinatra was the first actor to portray Donald Lam.

=== Television ===
Cool and Lam first appeared on television in the January 6, 1955, episode of Climax! based on the debut novel, The Bigger They Come (1939). It starred Art Carney as Donald Lam and Jane Darwell as Bertha Cool and is considered "lost."

A 30-minute pilot program called Cool and Lam was made in 1958 but never became a series. Billy Pearson was cast as Donald Lam and Benay Venuta as Bertha Cool. The pilot was loosely based on Turn On the Heat. One feature of interest is that, a few minutes after the start of the program, Erle Stanley Gardner is shown on the set of Perry Mason's office. He speaks directly to the viewer, introducing the characters, and talking about his pleasure in the casting and his hopes that the pilot will become a series. It is uncertain whether this pilot was ever broadcast and, if so, whether this segment featuring Gardner would have been included, since it pushed the running time of the program to the 30-minute mark and did not allow for commercials. The pilot was released on DVD and Blu-ray in October 2018 by VCI Entertainment, in Television's Lost Classics: Volume 2. The four rare pilots on the release were digitally restored in high definition by SabuCat Productions from the best archival film elements available.
