= Billy Pearson =

American jockey

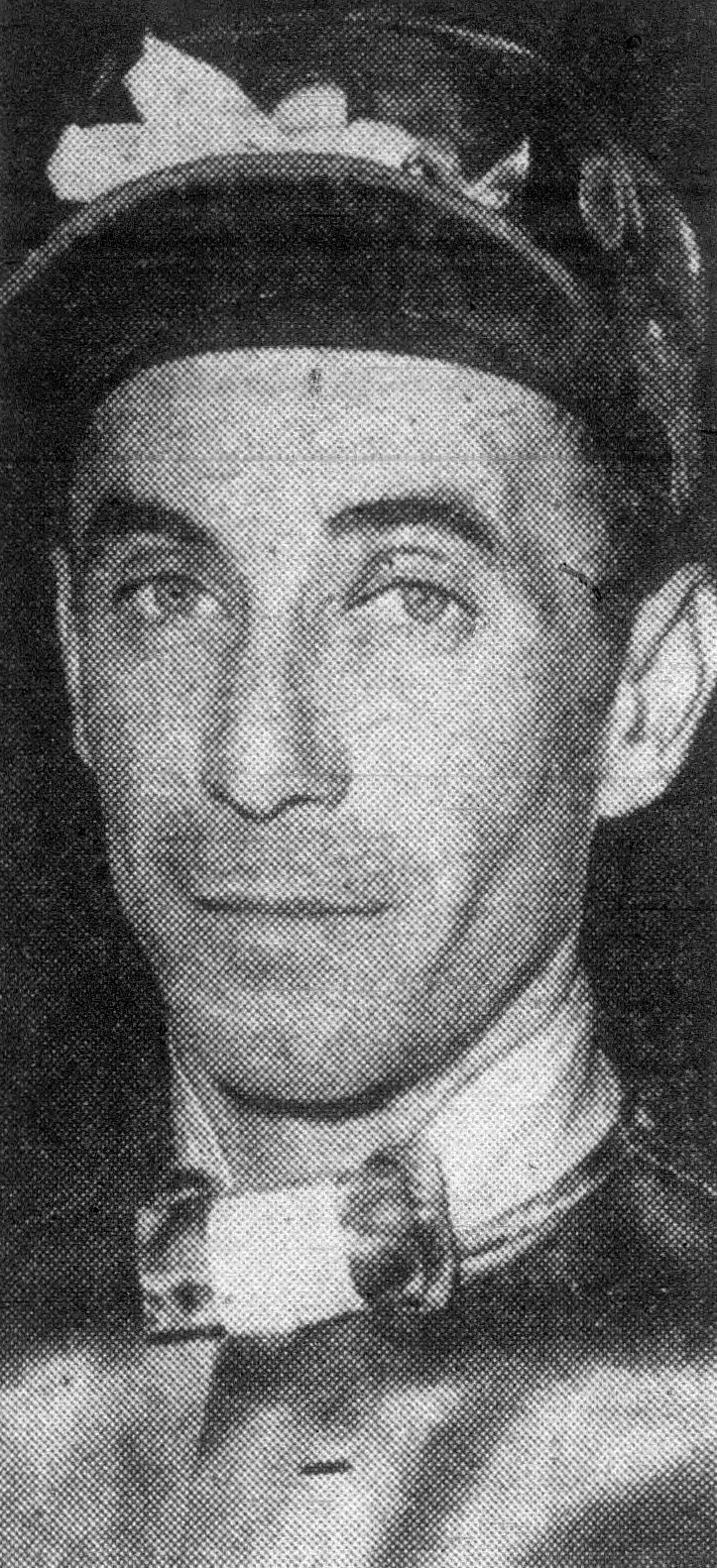
- Pearson, circa 1949

Personal information
- Born: May 19, 1920 Chicago, Illinois, United States
- Died: November 28, 2002 (aged 82)
- Occupation: Jockey

Horse racing career
- Sport: Horse racing
- Career wins: 800+

Major racing wins
- Bing Crosby Handicap (1951); Del Mar Handicap (1951); San Diego Handicap (1951, 1954); Del Mar Derby (1953); San Carlos Handicap (1953); Santa Catalina Stakes (1953, 1954)

Bill Austin Pearson (May 19, 1920 – November 28, 2002) was an American jockey in thoroughbred horse racing, a quiz-show winner, an art expert and dealer and an actor. He is credited with 826 victories in his horse racing career.

== Life and riding career ==
Bill Austin Pearson was born on May 19, 1920 in Chicago, Illinois, and moved to Pasadena, California when he was five years old. During the depression, he quit school and joined the Civilian Conservation Corps, where he became a flyweight boxer. Due to his dismal record, the director of the Corps informed him; "try something else kid, before you get killed, you're about the right size for a jockey". Pearson took the advice and got a job at the Le Mar Stock Farm at Santa Anita as a stable boy and hot walker.

By 1941, Pearson had become an accomplished rider but during a race at the Hollywood Park Racetrack, his horse crashed through a fence. As a result, Pearson was hospitalized for nine months to recover from a concussion and multiple broken ribs and other fractured bones.

A fellow rider, Jackie Westrope gave him a book on quilts, telling him; "because it looks like you're going to spend the rest of your life sewing". The book actually triggered a fascination with quilts for him, and he later bought a quilt at a Goodwill store for $8 USD that turned out be worth $2,000. He ended up donating it to the Smithsonian who valued it at $20,000. Pearson recalls that he began to really study "the design, the needlework, the stitches", and he became an expert, which forged a path to his interest in other art objects. Noted film director John Huston taught him about pre-Columbian and African art. In France, while racing for Baron Philippe de Rothschild, the Baron introduced him to classical and modern art. During this period, Pearson also continued to ride and is credited with 826 victories overall.

== Post-racing ==
In 1956, Pearson appeared on The $64,000 Question and became the fourth contestant in the show's history to win $64,000. He celebrated his success by partying and buying an Edward Hicks painting before he gambled away the remaining money in Las Vegas. Pearson then appeared on The $64,000 Challenge, again, telling Art Buchwald that he needed "to make enough money to pay taxes on the money he won on The 64,000 Question". After both successful wins on the game shows, he retired from racing. Through the friendship he had developed with Huston, he opened an art gallery in La Jolla, California, later relocating it to San Francisco. He dealt primarily in pre-Columbian, primitive and tribal art, American folk art and quilts, Hungarian painted furniture, model steam trains and World War I memorabilia. In 1996. Art & Antiques recognized him as one of the top 100 collectors in the United States. He was also instrumental in expanding the Oakland Museum of California.

On November 15, 1958, Pearson appeared as a jockey in an episode of Perry Mason called "The Case of the Jilted Jockey". Additionally, in 1958, he was cast as private eye Donald Lam in a pilot episode of Cool and Lam, based on the books by Erle Stanley Gardner writing as A. A. Fair, but the pilot was the only episode made, as the series was not picked up.

Pearson was married six times, and was living in Kingston, New York, at the time of his death in 2002.

== In popular culture ==
- Writer Sam Shepard dedicated his 1983 play Fool for Love to Pearson.

== See also ==
- List of horse accidents
