= Stagg Chili =

Convenience food

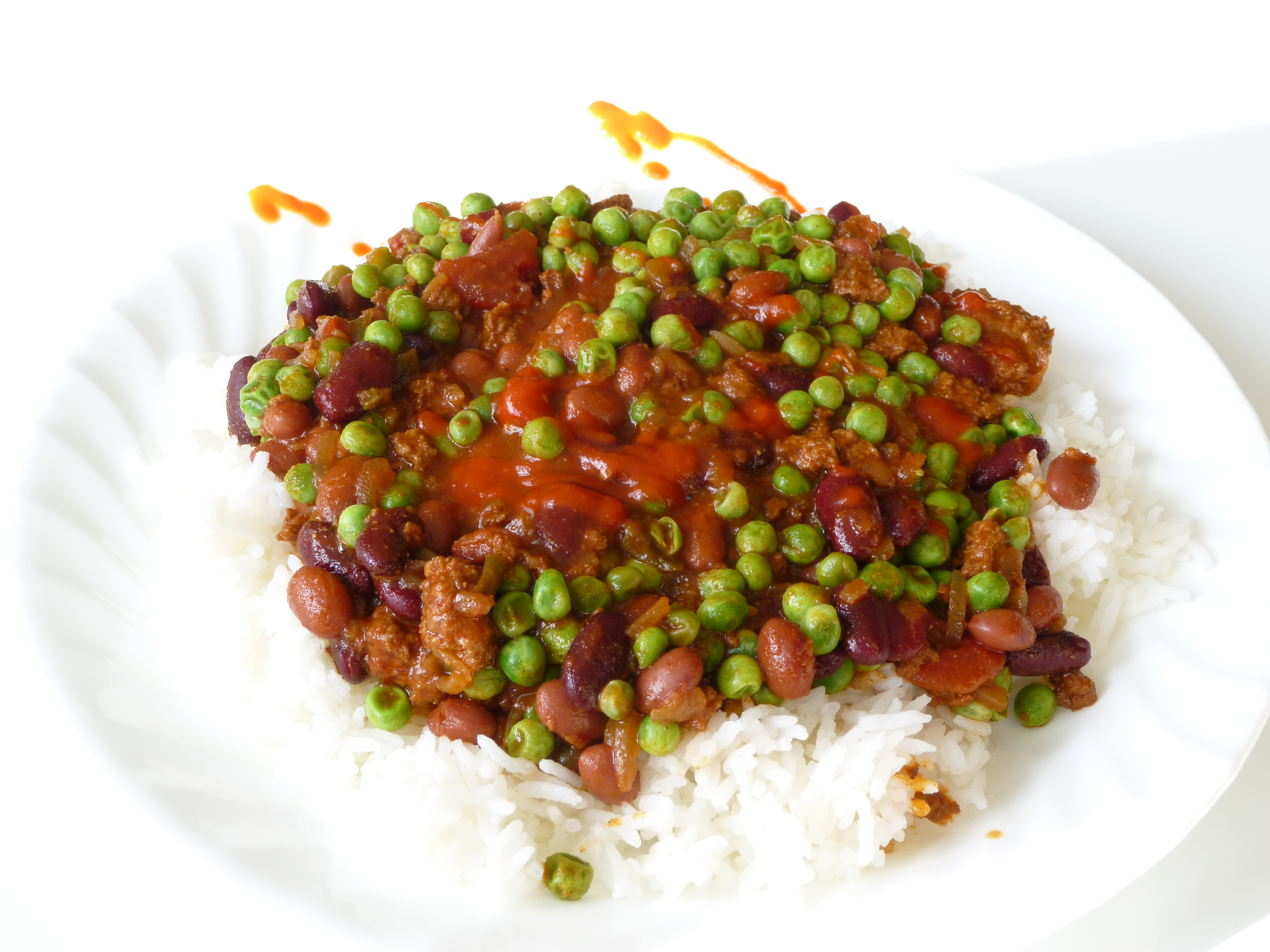
A plate of Stagg Chili with rice and peas

Stagg Chili is a brand of convenience food chili con carne sold by Hormel Foods. The company was first founded by Clement L. Hirsch in 1956, and sold to Hormel in 1996. In 2004, five new varieties of the brand were introduced in boxes.
