= Bob Benoit (horse racing) =

Robert P. Benoit (1927–2008) was chief operating officer and general manager of the Hollywood Park Racetrack in Inglewood, California. In 2004, he became the first recipient of the Laffit Pincay Jr. Award, given by Hollywood Park to a person who served racing with "integrity, extraordinary dedication, determination, and distinction".

Bob Benoit

== Biography ==
Benoit was born in Gary, Indiana, on Feb. 8, 1927. He graduated from Los Angeles (Calif.) High School, after which he joined the Army. He attended the University of California, Los Angeles, beginning in 1947 and was on the sports staff of the Daily Bruin, the student newspaper.

In 1951, Benoit became sports editor of the Inglewood Daily News, then worked part-time for the track until he became a full-time employee in 1955. He was promoted to publicity director in 1969. He became chief operating officer and general manager of the track in 1977.

He also founded a company that provided track photographers at Santa Anita, Hollywood Park, Del Mar and Fairplex Park race courses. He became publicity director at Playfair.

According to a Hollywood Park press release, Benoit was "instrumental in forming the Racetrack Chaplaincy of California and in bringing jockeys Sandy Hawley, Chris McCarron, Eddie Delahoussaye, and Darrel McHargue to Southern California".

He died of pneumonia on August 15, 2008, at Centinela Valley Hospital in Inglewood.
