= Michael Rowland (jockey) =

American jockey

Personal information
- Born: September 12, 1963 Saratoga Springs, New York
- Died: February 9, 2004 (aged 40) Cincinnati, Ohio
- Occupation: Jockey

Horse racing career
- Sport: Horse racing
- Career wins: 3,997

Major racing wins
- Juvenile Stakes (1984, 2002, 2003); Shaker Heights Handicap (1986); Best of Ohio Endurance (1987); Cleveland Gold Cup (1987); Cleveland Kindergarten Stakes (1987, 2002); Imp Stakes (1987); Lady Mannequin Stakes (1988); Summit Silver Cup (1988, 2003); Best of Ohio Juvenile (1989, 2003); Best of Ohio Distaff (1990); Tougaloo Stakes (1992); Wintergreen Stakes (1994); Annie Oakley Handicap (1995, 2001); Buckeye Handicap (1995, 2000); Loyalty Stakes (1995, 1996); Merry Time Stakes (1995, 2002); Miss Ohio Stakes (1995, 1999); Thistledown Handicap (1997); West Virginia Governor's Stakes (1997); Best of Ohio Juvenile Fillies (2000); Best of Ohio Sprint (2002); Quick Step Handicap (2003); Cincinnati Trophy Stakes (2004)

Honors
- Greater Cleveland Sports Hall of Fame (2006); Michael F. Rowland Memorial Handicap at Thistledown Racecourse

Michael Francis Rowland (September 12, 1963 – February 9, 2004) was an American jockey. He was born in Saratoga Springs, New York.

During his career, Rowland won 3,997 races.

Rowland died at University Hospital in Cincinnati, Ohio from head injuries suffered during a race on February 4 at Turfway Park, when his mount broke down and collapsed. Two other jockeys were injured. He was placed on life support, but never regained consciousness.

Turfway Park established the Michael F. Rowland Fund, as well as the Michael F. Rowland Award to honor the jockey who best exemplifies Rowland's work ethic, professionalism, and perseverance. The inaugural award recipient was Luis Antonio Gonzalez, a jockey based at Thistledown Racecourse near Cleveland. Thistledown racecourse also started a memorial fund for the Rowland family.

In 2006, Rowland was posthumously inducted into the Cleveland Sports Hall of Fame.
