= Desert Stormer Stakes =

Horse race in Arcadia, California, US

- Class: Listed
- Location: Santa Anita Park; Arcadia, California, USA
- Inaugurated: 1997 (as Desert Stormer Handicap at Hollywood Park Racetrack)
- Race type: Thoroughbred - Flat racing
- Website: www.santaanita.com

Race information
- Distance: 6 furlong sprint
- Surface: Dirt
- Track: left-handed
- Qualification: Fillies & mares, four-years-old and older
- Weight: 124 lbs with allowances
- Purse: $100,000

The Desert Stormer Stakes is a Listed American Thoroughbred horse race for fillies and mares age four and older run over a distance of six furlongs on the dirt held annually in March at Santa Anita Park in Arcadia, California.

== History ==
The inaugural running of the event was on 8 November 1997 as the Desert Stormer Handicap over a distance of 6 1/2 furlongs at Hollywood Park Racetrack in Inglewood, California as the first race on the undercard for the Breeders' Cup program. The event was named in honor of Desert Stormer, winner of the 1995 Breeders' Cup Sprint. The following year the event was moved to the spring meeting and held in late April.

In 1999 the distance of the event was decreased to six furlongs.

The event was upgraded to Grade III in 2001.

However, the event was downgraded to a non-graded stakes after the 2005 Grade III edition.

In 2014 with the closure of Hollywood Park Racetrack the event was moved to Santa Anita Park and continued to be scheduled in June as stakes race with allowances.

The event was reinstated with Grade III status for the 2017 running.

In 2023 the event was scheduled in March and the conditions of entry were changed from three-year-olds and over to four-year-olds and over.

In 2024 the event was downgraded by the Thoroughbred Owners and Breeders Association to Listed status.

== Records ==
Speed record:

- 1:07.75 - Shh She's Ours (2016)

Margins:

- 7 1/4 lengths – Marley's Freedom (2018)

Most wins:

- No horse has won this race more than once.

Most wins by a jockey:

- 4 - Mike E. Smith (2005, 2009, 2010, 2017)

Most wins by a trainer:

- 3 - Richard Mandella (1997, 1998, 2017)
- 3 - Bob Baffert (2006, 2011, 2018)

Most wins by an owner:

- 2 - Mr. & Mrs. Jerome S. Moss (1998, 2009)
- 2 - Marsha Naify (2007, 2010)

== Winners ==
Year	Winner	Age	Jockey	Trainer	Owner	Distance	Time	Purse	Grade	Ref
At Santa Anita – Desert Stormer Stakes
2024	Chismosa	4	Tiago Pereira	Rafael DeLeon	Jaime Roberto Renella	6 furlongs	1:09.70	$100,500	Listed	
2023	Dance to the Music	4	Juan Hernandez	Mark Glatt	Red Baron's Barn & Rancho Temescal	6 furlongs	1:10.45	$98,000	III	
2022	Becca Taylor	4	Juan Hernandez	Steven Miyadi	Nicholas B. Alexander	6 furlongs	1:09.35	$98,000	III	
2021	Race not held									
2020	Bellafina	4	Flavien Prat	Simon Callaghan	Kaleem Shah, Derrick Smith, Mrs. John Magnier & Michael Tabor	6 furlongs	1:09.85	$101,000	III	
2019	Danuska's My Girl	5	Geovanni Franco	Jerry Hollendorfer	Bad Boy Racing	6 furlongs	1:10.12	$92,000	III	
2018	Marley's Freedom	4	Drayden Van Dyke	Bob Baffert	Cicero Farms	6 furlongs	1:09.31	$100,000	III	
2017	Bendable	4	Mike E. Smith	Richard E. Mandella	Claiborne Farm	6 furlongs	1:09.04	$100,000	III	
2016	Shh She's Ours	4	Victor Espinoza	James M. Cassidy	D P Racing	6 furlongs	1:07.75	$79,300	Listed	
2015	Amaranth	4	William Antongeorgi III	O. J. Jauregui	Highland Yard	6 furlongs	1:09.42	$82,000		
2014	Sagebrush Queen	4	Edwin A. Maldonado	Jorge Gutierrez	Larry Konecne & Sandi Mattei	6 furlongs	1:09.75	$94,100		
At Hollywood Park – Desert Stormer Handicap
2013	Include Me Out	5	Joseph Talamo	Ronald W. Ellis	Jay Em Ess Stable	6 furlongs	1:10.32	$77,070		
2012	Turbulent Descent	4	David R. Flores	Mike Puype	Blinkers On Racing Stable	6 furlongs	1:09.25	$72,570		
2011	Irish Gypsy	5	Martin Garcia	Bob Baffert	Michael E. Pegram & John G. Sikura	6 furlongs	1:09.67	$76,050		
2010	Free Flying Soul	5	Mike E. Smith	Bruce Headley	Marsha Naify	6 furlongs	1:09.10	$62,500		
2009	Coco Belle	5	Mike E. Smith	John W. Sadler	Mr. & Mrs. Jerome S. Moss	6 furlongs	1:08.35	$72,800		
2008	Ashley's Kitty	4	Joseph Talamo	Ted H. West	Oak West Farm	6 furlongs	1:09.01	$81,300	Listed	
2007	Selvatica	6	David R. Flores	Julio C. Canani	Marsha Naify	6 furlongs	1:09.58	$76,775	Listed	
2006	My Miss Storm Cat	4	Victor Espinoza	Bob Baffert	Ed Friendly	6 furlongs	1:09.44	$68,690	Listed	
2005	Puxa Saco	5	Mike E. Smith	Jenine Sahadi	Richard Rowan	6 furlongs	1:09.79	$106,400	III	
2004	Coconut Girl	5	Victor Espinoza	Paul G. Aguirre	JPF Investments	6 furlongs	1:08.91	$106,000	III	
2003	Madame Pietra	6	Pat Valenzuela	Howard L. Zucker	Carl T. Grether	6 furlongs	1:09.71	$106,800	III	
2002	Slewsbox	5	Laffit Pincay Jr.	Chuck Peery	Leonard Dunham & Jerome Gardipee	6 furlongs	1:09.57	$107,100	III	
2001	Go Go	4	Eddie Delahoussaye	Warren Stute	Alan B. & Paula Thomas	6 furlongs	1:08.09	$106,000	III	
2000	Theresa's Tizzy	6	Laffit Pincay Jr.	Noble Threewitt	Sam Bellestri, Tex Johnson & Julie Leach, et al	6 furlongs	1:09.30	$108,300	Listed	
1999	A. P. Assay	5	Eddie Delahoussaye	J. Paco Gonzalez	John Toffan & Trudy McCaffery	6 furlongs	1:08.69	$106,000	Listed	
1998	Corona Lake	4	Eddie Delahoussaye	Richard E. Mandella	Mr. & Mrs. Jerome S. Moss	6 1/2 furlongs	1:14.71	$106,700	Listed	
1997	Advancing Star	4	Kent J. Desormeaux	Richard E. Mandella	Golden Eagle Farm	6 1/2 furlongs	1:14.21	$100,000	Listed	

Legend:
All Weather Track Dirt

== See also ==
- List of American and Canadian Graded races
