= Álvaro Pineda =

Mexican jockey (1945–1975)

Personal information
- Born: November 9, 1945 Mexico
- Died: January 18, 1975 (aged 29)
- Occupation: Jockey

Horse racing career
- Sport: Horse racing
- Career wins: 2,731

Major racing wins
- Del Mar Oaks (1966, 1967, 1969); San Gabriel Handicap (1966); Frank E. Kilroe Mile (1967); San Juan Capistrano Handicap (1967, 1968); El Encino Stakes (1968); Del Mar Handicap (1969); Hollywood Gold Cup (1969); Arlington-Washington Breeders' Cup Lassie (1973); Del Mar Derby (1974); Malibu Stakes (1975)

Racing awards
- Leading rider at Del Mar Racetrack (1968); George Woolf Memorial Jockey Award (1974)

Honors
- Handicap Alvaro Pineda - Hipódromo de Las Américas

Significant horses
- Figonero
- Updated on May 18, 2007

Álvaro Pineda (November 9, 1945 – January 18, 1975) was a Mexican jockey who competed in thoroughbred horse racing in the United States. A top jockey in California, in 1966 Álvaro Pineda finished second in wins at Del Mar Racetrack to Donald Pierce and was the track's leading rider in 1968. He made one appearance in the Kentucky Derby, finishing 13th in 1967.

In 1974, Álvaro Pineda's peers voted him the George Woolf Memorial Jockey Award, awarded annually to a jockey in American racing who demonstrates high standards of personal and professional conduct, on and off the racetrack.

In early 1975, while competing at Santa Anita Park in Arcadia, California, Álvaro Pineda was killed from a blow to his head when his horse, Austin Mittler, reared in the starting gate and flipped over, crushing his head against the steel frame of the gate. In 1978 his younger brother Roberto, a jockey competing at Pimlico Race Course in Baltimore, Maryland, also died from an accident during a race.
