= Roberto Pineda =

American jockey (1952–1978)

Personal information
- Born: July 29, 1952 Mexico
- Died: May 3, 1978 (aged 25)
- Occupation: Jockey

Horse racing career
- Sport: Horse racing
- Career wins: 1,500+ according to his obituary
- Updated on May 18, 2007

Roberto Pineda (July 29, 1952 – May 3, 1978) was a Mexican jockey who competed in Thoroughbred horse racing in the United States.

Racing at Pimlico Race Course in Baltimore, Maryland, on May 3, 1978, Roberto Pineda was in an accident that took his life. Jockey Rudy Turcotte's horse went down, setting off a chain reaction collision involving Pineda and jockey James Thornton. All three jockeys were seriously injured, with Pineda dying later that day.

For the Pineda family, this was the second such racing tragedy. Roberto's older brother, Alvaro, a top jockey in California who had won the 1974 George Woolf Memorial Jockey Award, was also killed in a freak starting gate accident at Santa Anita Park in 1975. By coincidence, and underscoring the dangers to jockeys, 1973 Triple Crown-winning jockey Ron Turcotte, brother of Rudy, was in a separate accident that same month, in which he suffered a cervical fracture of the spine and became a paraplegic.

Pineda was survived by his wife Maxine and their two sons, Roberto Jr and Alvaro Cipriano.

Roberto and his brother Álvaro are buried in Forest Lawn Memorial Park Glendale Los Angeles County California in plot: Garden of Honor, Lot 6820–1.
