= Merlin Volzke =

American jockey

Personal information
- Born: October 5, 1925 United States
- Died: February 21, 2013 (aged 87)
- Occupation: Jockey

Horse racing career
- Sport: Horse racing
- Career wins: Not found

Major racing wins
- Gottstein Futurity (1952); Santa Anita Maturity (1954); San Pasqual Handicap (1954); California Breeders' Champion Stakes (1968); San Gabriel Handicap (1968); Frank E. Kilroe Mile (1969); La Jolla Handicap (1969); San Miguel Stakes (1969); Hollywood Derby (1970)

Racing awards
- Leading jockey at Longacres Racetrack (1948); George Woolf Memorial Jockey Award (1958); Laffit Pincay Jr. Award (2009)
- Updated on July 11, 2009

Merlin Paul Volzke (October 5, 1925 – February 21, 2013) was an American jockey who raced primarily on the West Coast of the United States. He began his professional career in the 1940s and in 1948 won the riding title at Longacres Racetrack in Renton, Washington.

In 1958, Volzke was honored with the George Woolf Memorial Jockey Award, given to a jockey who demonstrates high standards of personal and professional conduct, on and off the racetrack.

Volzke retired from riding in the 1970s but remained in the industry, working as a Senior race steward at Los Alamitos Race Course in Cypress, California until he stepped down after twenty-six years of service at the age of 79 in 2005.

At ceremonies held at Hollywood Park Racetrack on July 11, 2009, Volzke was given the Laffit Pincay Jr. Award, an honor awarded annually since 2004 to an individual, who has served the sport with integrity, extraordinary dedication, determination and distinction.
