= Ack Ack Handicap (Hollywood Park) =

- Class: Grade III
- Location: Hollywood Park Racetrack; Inglewood, California, United States
- Inaugurated: 2001
- Race type: Thoroughbred - Flat racing
- Website: www.hollywoodpark.com

Race information
- Distance: 7 1/2 furlongs
- Surface: Cushion Track
- Track: Left-handed
- Qualification: Three-year-olds & up
- Weight: Assigned
- Purse: $100,000

The Ack Ack Handicap was a Grade III race for Thoroughbred horses run at Hollywood Park in June.

Open to horses aged three and up, the Ack Ack was set at a distance of 7 1/2 furlongs and offered a purse of $100,000. It was raced on dirt since its inaugural running in 2001 until 2007 after the new synthetic Cushion Track had been installed.

The race was named for the great Ack Ack, inducted into the National Museum of Racing and Hall of Fame in 1986 and the Horse of the Year in 1971, as well as ranking number 44 in the Blood-Horse magazine List of the Top 100 U.S. Racehorses of the 20th Century.

This race was run as a stake in 2001.

== Records ==
Speed record:

- 1:27.15 - Joey Franco (2003)

== Winners of the Ack Ack Handicap ==
Year	Winner	Age	Jockey	Trainer	Owner	Time
2010	NO RACE					
2009	Noble Court	5	Joel Rosario	John W. Sadler	Joy Ride Racing	1:27.32
2008	Rebellion (GB)	5	Rafael Bejarano	H. Graham Motion	Hickory Tree Stable	1:27.68
2007	El Roblar	5	Victor Espinoza	Richard Mandella	Stonestreet Stables LLC	1:28.51
2006	Lucky J. H.	4	Patrick Valenzuela	Carla Gaines	Harris Farms, Inc.	1:29.66
2005	McCann's Mojave	5	Jose Valdivia, Jr.	Patrick Gallagher	Mike Willman	1:27.23
2004	Taste of Paradise	5	Jon Court	Molly Pearson	David B. Bloom	1:28.02
2003	Joey Franco	4	Patrick Valenzuela	Darrell Vienna	Gerald Frankel	1:27.15
2002	NO RACE					
2001	Grey Memo	4	Garrett Gomez	Warren Stute	Manzani, Ridgeley Farm & Russ	1:28.19
