= Torrey Pines Stakes =

Horse race in Del Mar, California, US

- Class: Grade III
- Location: Del Mar Racetrack; Del Mar, California, United States
- Inaugurated: 1976
- Race type: Thoroughbred - Flat racing
- Website: Del Mar

Race information
- Distance: 1 mile
- Surface: Dirt
- Track: Left-handed
- Qualification: Three-year-old fillies
- Weight: 124 lbs with allowances
- Purse: $150,000 (since 2023)

The Torrey Pines Stakes is a Grade III American Thoroughbred horse race for three-year-old fillies run over a distance of one mile on the dirt held annually in August at the Del Mar Racetrack in Del Mar, California. The event currently carries a purse of $150,000.

== History ==
The event was inaugurated on 10 September 1976 and held in split divisions and was run over a distance of 1 1/16 miles on a rainy day. The event is named after Torrey Pines, a community of in the northern coastal area of San Diego, California, and south from Del Mar.

The event was run as a restricted overnight stakes from 1976 to 2004. The last restriction in 2004 was for non-winners of a sweepstakes event where the winner had won $50,000 or more at one mile or over.

The distance of the event was decreased to one mile in 1997.

This race was upgraded to a Grade III in 2014.

The 2013 winner Beholder went on to win the Breeders' Cup Distaff and was crowned US Champion Three-Year-Old Filly. The 2015 winner Stellar Wind was also crowned US Champion Three-Year-Old Filly that year.

== Records ==
Speed record:

- 1 mile: 1:34.86 - Potesta (2012)
- 1 1/16 miles: 1:41.00 - Drama Critic (1977)

Margins:

- 8 1/2 lengths - Magical Allure (1998)

Most wins by a jockey:

- 4 - Chris McCarron (1981, 1987, 1993, 1998)

Most wins by a trainer:

- 9 - Bob Baffert (1998, 2000, 2005, 2014, 2019, 2021, 2022, 2024, 2026)

Most wins by an owner:

- 2 - Ike & Dawn Thrash (2008, 2009)
- 2 - Michael E. Pegram (2005, 2022)

== Winners ==
Year	Winner	Jockey	Trainer	Owner	Distance	Time	Purse	Grade	Ref
2026	Rabeeba	Juan J. Hernandez	Bob Baffert	Michael Lund Petersen	1 mile	1:38.19	$150,000	III	
2025	Om N Joy	Kent Desormeaux	Aggie Ordonez	Connie S. & Jerry Baker, Michael Golovko & Terrence J. Scanlan	1 mile	1:36.99	$151,000	III	
2024	Hope Road	Juan J. Hernandez	Bob Baffert	Cicero Farms	1 mile	1:36.15	$150,500	III	
2023	Ceiling Crusher	Edwin Maldonado	Doug F. O'Neill	Wonderland Racing Stables, Todd Cady, Tim Kasparoff & Ty Leatherman	1 mile	1:37.41	$151,500	III	
2022	Midnight Memories	Ramon Vazquez	Bob Baffert	Karl Watson, Michael E. Pegram & Paul Weitman	1 mile	1:36.32	$125,500	III	
2021	Private Mission	Flavien Prat	Bob Baffert	Baoma Corporation	1 mile	1:37.89	$101,000	III	
2020	Harvest Moon	Flavien Prat	Simon Callaghan	Alice Bamford & Michael Tabor	1 mile	1:36.87	$100,500	III	
2019	Fighting Mad	Joseph Talamo	Bob Baffert	Gary & Mary West	1 mile	1:38.61	$100,702	III	
2018	True Royalty	Drayden Van Dyke	John W. Sadler	Batchelor Family Trust	1 mile	1:39.07	$101,725	III	
2017	† Munny Spunt	Drayden Van Dyke	Doug F. O'Neill	ERJ Racing, John Fuller, Richie Robershaw, Doug O'Neill & S. Rothblum	1 mile	1:37.20	$100,690	III	
2016	Belvoir Bay (GB)	Norberto Arroyo Jr.	Peter L. Miller	Team Valor International & Gary Barber	1 mile	1:36.56	$100,000	III	
2015	Stellar Wind	Victor Espinoza	John W. Sadler	Hronis Racing	1 mile	1:36.43	$100,250	III	
2014	Jojo Warrior	Martin Garcia	Bob Baffert	Zayat Stables	1 mile	1:37.10	$100,250	III	
2013	Beholder	Gary L. Stevens	Richard E. Mandella	Spendthrift Farm	1 mile	1:36.30	$100,000	Listed	
2012	Potesta	Joseph Talamo	Mike R. Mitchell	Anthony Fanticola & Joseph Scardino	1 mile	1:34.86	$100,000	Listed	
2011	Great Hot (BRZ)	Chantal Sutherland	A. C. Avila	Coudelaria Jessica	1 mile	1:35.88	$100,000	Listed	
2010	Switch	Joel Rosario	John W. Sadler	C R K Stable	1 mile	1:36.25	$100,000	Listed	
2009	Third Dawn	Joel Rosario	John W. Sadler	Ike & Dawn Thrash	1 mile	1:37.60	$100,000	Listed	
2008	Dawn Before Dawn	Garrett K. Gomez	John W. Sadler	Ike & Dawn Thrash	1 mile	1:37.10	$100,000	Listed	
2007	Seaside Affair	Richard Migliore	John W. Sadler	Edmund A. Gann	1 mile	1:41.04	$140,650	Listed	
2006	Political Web	Victor Espinoza	Julio C. Canani	Everest Stables	1 mile	1:37.98	$108,500	Listed	
2005	Pussycat Doll	Victor Espinoza	Bob Baffert	Michael E. Pegram	1 mile	1:36.21	$100,000	Listed	
2004	Muir Beach	Omar Figueroa	Dan L. McFarlane	Dennis E. Weir	1 mile	1:37.89	$81,450	Restricted	
2003	Victory Encounter	Mike E. Smith	John W. Sadler	Tom Mankiewicz	1 mile	1:36.45	$87,450	Restricted	
2002	Got Koko	Alex O. Solis	Bruce Headley	Aase Headley & Paul Leung	1 mile	1:37.00	$82,050	Restricted	
2001	Tamara Princess (BRZ)	Mike E. Smith	Eduardo Inda	Aaron U. & Marie D. Jones	1 mile	1:36.18	$81,400	Restricted	
2000	Saudi Poetry	David R. Flores	Bob Baffert	The Thoroughbred Corporation	1 mile	1:36.56	$82,775	Restricted	
1999	Perfect Six	David R. Flores	William J. Morey Jr.	Carole & Don Chaiken and Mr. & Mrs. Barton D. Heller	1 mile	1:37.20	$81,300	Restricted	
1998	Magical Allure	Chris McCarron	Bob Baffert	Golden Eagle Farm	1 mile	1:35.60	$89,950	Restricted	
1997	Relaxing Rhythm	Gary L. Stevens	David E. Hofmans	Frank H. Stronach	1 mile	1:35.80	$78,950	Restricted	
1996	Race not held								
1995	Main Slew	Eddie Delahoussaye	Jerry M. Fanning	Jerry M. Fanning & Craig Singer	1 1/16 miles	1:42.20	$75,850	Restricted	
1994	Race not held								
1993	Adorydar	Chris McCarron	Ron McAnally	Mr & Mrs Jerome Brody	1 1/16 miles	1:42.20	$56,350	Restricted	
1992	Interactive	Laffit Pincay Jr.	Lewis A. Cenicola	Southern Nevada Racing Stables Inc	1 1/16 miles	1:42.60	$56,125	Restricted	
1991	Number's Game	Corey Nakatani	Brian A. Mayberry	La Poz Stable	1 1/16 miles	1:43.40	$80,175	Restricted	
1990	Oh Sweet Thing	Pat Valenzuela	Steve Ippolito	Frank & Carol Laiacono	1 1/16 miles	1:42.80	$82,275	Restricted	
1989	Affirmed Classic	Jesus Lopez Castanon	Ron McAnally	David Beard	1 1/16 miles	1:41.40	$79,650	Restricted	
1988	Affordable Price	Fernando Toro	Jerry M. Fanning	Dan Dar Farm & Northwest Farms	1 1/16 miles	1:41.80	$65,800	Restricted	
1987	Julie the Flapper	Chris McCarron	D. Wayne Lukas	Calumet Farm	1 1/16 miles	1:41.40	$55,250	Restricted	
1986	Margaret Booth	Fernando Toro	John Gosden	Ray & Francis Stark	1 1/16 miles	1:42.20	$54,050	Restricted	
1985	Goldspell	Rafael Q. Meza	Henry Moreno	James L. Wilder & Walt Burris	1 1/16 miles	1:41.40	$54,500	Restricted	
1984	Allusion	Eddie Delahoussaye	Willard L. Proctor	Claiborne Farm	1 1/16 miles	1:42.60	$54,350	Restricted	
1983	Mazatleca (MEX)	Kenneth D. Black	Hal King	Doe, Hal King, Richard & Gaylin Landeis	1 1/16 miles	1:43.40	$56,050	Restricted	
1982	Agitated Lady	Sandy Hawley	Gordon C. Campbell	Sonny Silverstein	1 1/16 miles	1:42.80	$43,100	Restricted	
1981	Northern Fable	Chris McCarron	Charles E. Whittingham	Michael G. Rutherford	1 1/16 miles	1:42.20	$42,900	Restricted	
1980	Summer Siren	Terry Lipham	Louis R. Carno	Mr. & Mrs. Thomas Cavanagh	1 1/16 miles	1:42.80	$44,600	Restricted	
1979	Double Deceit	Sandy Hawley	Laz Barrera	Leslie Combs II	1 1/16 miles	1:43.00	$38,700	Restricted	
1978	Donna Inez	Bill Shoemaker	Charles E. Whittingham	Howard B. Keck	1 1/16 miles	1:45.40	$27,750	Restricted	
1977	Drama Critic	Marco Castaneda	Ron McAnally	Elmendorf Farm	1 1/16 miles	1:41.00	$21,850	Restricted	
1976	Quintas Fannie	Marco Castaneda	Thomas M. Burns	Richard D. Bokum III	1 1/16 miles	1:44.00	$16,225	Restricted	Division 1
1976	Madam Gaylady	Marco Castaneda	Joseph Manzi	Sumi Ford	1 1/16 miles	1:45.00	$16,225	Restricted	Division 2

Legend:
All Weather Track Dirt
Notes:
† In the 2017 running of the event Zapperkat won the race but was disqualified for drifting out in the straight and interfering with Munny Spunt.

== See also ==
- List of American and Canadian Graded races
