= Willy Kan =

Hong Kong female jockey (1978–1999)

Willy Kan Wai-yue (簡慧榆) (June 17, 1978 – March 21, 1999), was a popular and promising female apprentice jockey from Hong Kong, who rode to no fewer than 17 victories in her short career (1997–1999). She was the first female to ride in the Hong Kong Derby and was known as "Little Sister" due to her likable personality.

== Career ==
Kan apprenticed with trainer Kan Ping Chee in 1997. On February 1, 1998, she got her inaugural win on Sir Galway (trained by Brian Kan) and on May 30, 1998, she won the Queen Mother's Cup in her first Trophy victory on Fat Choy Together (also trained by Brian Kan). Later that year, on June 23, she rode in Britain for trainer David Nicholls and got one win. She also won an apprentice race at Haydock in July on Nervous Rex. However, her mount that day crashed through the rail after the winning post, leaving Kan with concussion and an eye injury which eventually required surgery. The fall forced her to miss the first three months of the Hong Kong season.

On March 3, 1999, Kan created history by becoming the first female to ride in the Hong Kong Derby. She rode Man of Honour, trained by Ivan Allan. Her career ended less than a month later.

== Accident ==
Kan's last race took place on a rainy day at the Sha Tin Racecourse in Hong Kong. It was the third race of the day, run at a distance of 1400 meters for Class 5 horses. Kan was racing in midfield on Happy King (漢廷之寶), trained by Alex Wong, when about halfway in the seven-furlong race, the seven-year-old clipped the heels of Big Fortune, causing her to fall in front of four horses. Two of these – Solidarity and Lucky Afleet – severely trampled her, kicking her in the chest and head. Kan was rushed to the Prince of Wales Hospital where she underwent emergency surgery for skull fractures and internal bleeding, but later died. The last race at the course was cancelled out of respect and the trophy awarded to the Champion Apprentice each season has now been renamed the "Willy Kan Memorial Cup" in her honor.

French jockey Eric Saint-Martin had complained about the state of the track ahead of the start, but racing had continued after Jockey Club officials had spoken to official jockeys' representatives, Eric Legrix and Eddie Lai.

Kan was the first jockey to die racing in Hong Kong since Brian Taylor in 1984. This was the second fatality at Sha Tin since the track opened in 1978 and only the third in Hong Kong.

Kan's former trainer Brian Kan (no relation) did not take another apprentice after her death, but funded and built a memorial school in mainland China in her name.

== Court case ==
After her death, the insurers, Lloyds, launched a court case against her estate and the Hong Kong Jockey Club, relating to a feature race at Sha Tin on May 3, 1998, where a horse, Harbour Master, suffered a severed tendon in its left foreleg. The insurers claimed that Harbour Master was injured due to interference on the track created by Kan, who rode Winning Scene (and, in fact, Kan was suspended from riding for five days after the race due to her reckless riding). According to the insurers, this interference caused a domino effect leading to Celestial Fortune's leg clipping Harbor Master's foreleg. Lloyd's was seeking to recoup Ff3.5 million (pounds 325,000) in insurance paid out after Harbour Master, owned by Hong Kong business tycoon Dickson Poon, had to be put down following the accident.

This case marked the first time that a racing authority and jockey was seen as potentially responsible to the owner of the injured horse, as opposed to another jockey. Poon himself issued a statement to stress that the court action was not instigated by him, while Joseph Fox, counsel for the HKJC and the estate of Kan, said the law had never been tested on this point and it could expose jockeys to lawsuits every time they rode a race.

The case was heard and eventually dismissed by Justice William Stone.
