= Warren Stute =

American racehorse trainer

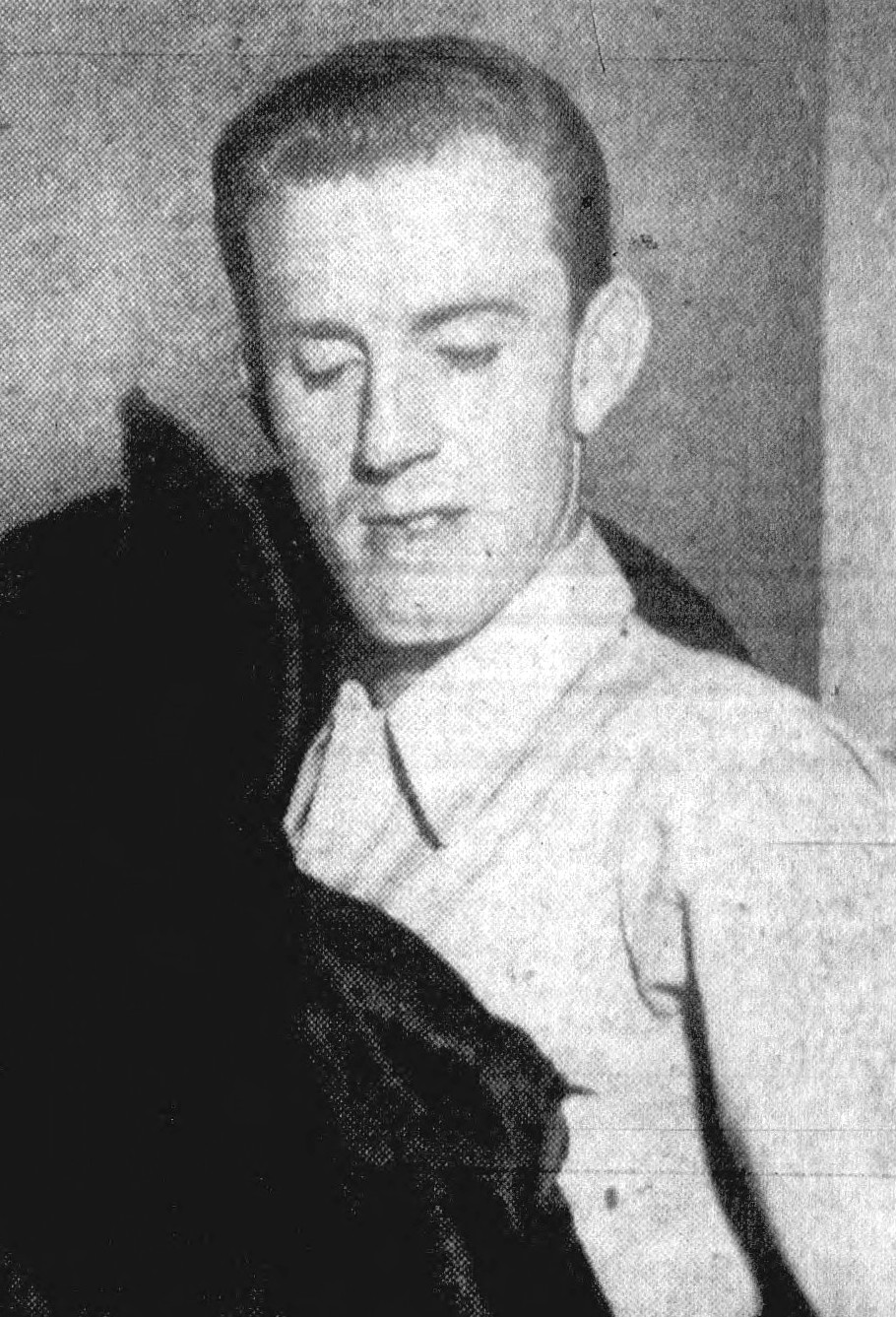
- Stute, circa 1951

Personal information
- Born: September 30, 1921 Fort Wayne, Indiana, US
- Died: August 9, 2007 (aged 85) Arcadia, California, US
- Resting place: Live Oak Memorial Park, Monrovia, California
- Occupation: Trainer

Horse racing career
- Sport: Horse racing
- Career wins: 1,946

Major racing wins
- Del Mar Derby (1950); Cinema Handicap (1950); California Breeders' Champion Stakes (1951); Del Mar Debutante Stakes (1951, 2002); Santa Anita Maturity (1951); Honeymoon Handicap (1952); Sunset Handicap (1952); Santa Ynez Stakes (1957); Santa Monica Stakes (1963); Vanity Handicap (1963); Round Table Handicap (1964); American Handicap (1969); Del Mar Handicap (1969); Hollywood Gold Cup (1969); Anoakia Stakes (1970); Del Mar Futurity (1970); Charles H. Strub Stakes (1970); Norfolk Stakes (1970); Oak Leaf Stakes (1970); Palomar Handicap (1970); Sacramento Handicap (1970); San Francisco Mile Handicap (1971); San Diego Handicap (1972, 2002); Senator Ken Maddy Handicap (1978); Ack Ack Handicap (1981); Inglewood Handicap (1982); Harry Henson Stakes (1983); Bing Crosby Handicap (1985); Hollywood Starlet Stakes (1991); Las Virgenes Stakes (1992); Linda Vista Handicap (1992); Chula Vista Handicap (1993); Louis R. Rowan Handicap (1994); Hollywood Prevue Stakes (1999); Snow Chief Stakes (2000); A Gleam Handicap (2001); Desert Stormer Handicap (2001); Las Cienegas Handicap (2001); Las Flores Handicap (2001); Manhattan Beach Stakes (2002); International race wins: Godolphin Mile (2002)

Racing awards
- Laffit Pincay Jr. Award (2006)

Significant horses
- Figonero, Grey Memo, June Darling, Magical Maiden, Snow Sporting, Table Mate

Warren R. Stute (September 30, 1921 – August 9, 2007) was an American Thoroughbred horse racing trainer who conditioned racehorses for almost 70 years from a base in California. Clement L. Hirsch, co-founder and owner of Oak Tree Racing Association was among his prominent clients and someone whose horses he trained for more than forty years. He also trained for prominent show-biz people such as Walter Matthau as well as Betty Grable and her husband, bandleader Harry James.

== Racing career ==
Warren Stute made plans for a career in racing as a jockey but after serving with the United States Army Air Force he was too heavy to ride and began working at the Santa Anita Park stables in Arcadia, California, as a hotwalker and a galloper of horses under trainer Yorky McLeod. He obtained his trainers' license in 1940 and by 1948 had set up his own public stable. In 1951, he won the then richest race in the United States, the Santa Anita Maturity at Santa Anita Park. Of racing history significance is that Stute chose as his jockey a kid named Bill Shoemaker. The win gave both Stute and Shoemaker their first ever $100,000 race win. In 2002 Warren Stute got his first million dollar race win in the Godolphin Mile at Nad Al Sheba Racecourse in Dubai.

Figonero, an Argentine import, was the best horse Warren Stute ever trained. In 1969, the horse won three races in eight days including the American Handicap on turf and the Hollywood Gold Cup on dirt. Figerono also set a world record in his win of the 1969 Del Mar Handicap, running 1 1/8 miles in 1:46 1/5.

=== Pincay Award ===
Along with brother Mel, Warren Stute was the recipient of the 2006 Laffit Pincay, Jr. Award given annually by Hollywood Park Racetrack to someone who has served the horse racing industry with integrity, dedication, determination and distinction.
