= Clement L. Hirsch =

American businessman and racehorse owner

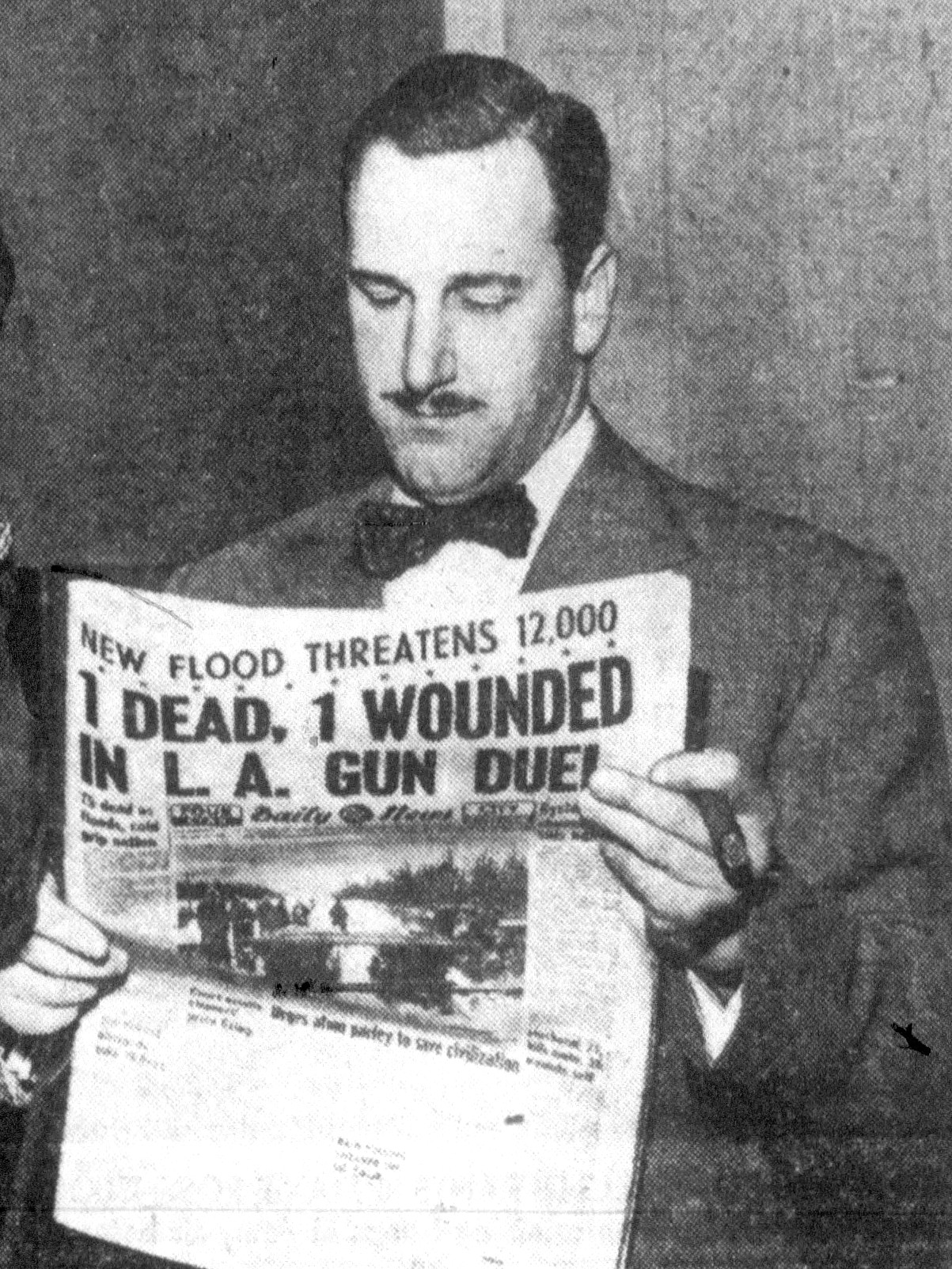
- Hirsch, circa 1950
- Born: April 26, 1914; St. Louis, Missouri, United States
- Died: March 15, 2000 (aged 85); Newport Beach, California, United States
- Occupations: Businessman, Thoroughbred racing executive, Racehorse owner/breeder
- Known for: Founder: Kal Kan Foods & Oak Tree Racing Association
- Board member of: Oak Tree Racing Association; Del Mar Thoroughbred Club; California Thoroughbred Breeders Association; World Affairs Councils of America; Hubbs-SeaWorld Research Institute; Chapman University (Life Trustee); Bank of Los Angeles
- Spouse(s): 1) Maxine 2) Edith Mack Hirsch; 3) Claudia H. Mirken; 4) Lynn Booth
- Children: 6
- Honors: NTRA Commissioners Cup (1988); Clement L. Hirsch Turf Championship Stakes at Santa Anita Park; Clement L. Hirsch Handicap at Del Mar Racetrack

Clement Lang Hirsch (April 26, 1914 – March 15, 2000) was an American businessman and a prominent Thoroughbred racehorse owner who co-founded Oak Tree Racing Association.

== Early life and military career ==
Born in St. Louis, Missouri to a very successful family of retail merchants, Hirsch moved to California as a young man. During World War II he served with the United States Marine Corps and was part of the Guadalcanal Campaign.

== Career ==
=== Pet food career ===
In 1936, Hirsch founded the Dog Town Packing Company in Vernon, California which became a highly successful pet food producer he later renamed Kal Kan Foods, Inc. In 1968, Mars, Incorporated acquired the company and today it forms part of their Pedigree Petfoods division. He also was the founder of Stagg Foods of Costa Mesa which he built into a major producer of canned chili. He sold Stagg Foods in 1996 to Hormel Foods.

=== Thoroughbred horse racing ===
Hirsch purchased his first Thoroughbred racehorse in 1947. A rarity in the racing industry, during his more than fifty years racing horses, Hirsch employed only two trainers. He first hired Robert H. McDaniel (Red McDaniel), then after he decided to move to Las Vegas, he hired Warren Stute, who remained with him for more than forty years.

A member of The Jockey Club, as an owner Hirsch was successful with a number of horses imported from South America, among them the colt Figonero, who won the 1969 Hollywood Gold Cup and set a world record for 1 1/8 miles (1.8 km) in winning the Del Mar Handicap. Hirsch was also successful with the filly Magical Maiden, who won the 1991 Hollywood Starlet and the 1992 Las Virgenes Stakes. In 1993, Magical Maiden won the Chula Vista Handicap at Del Mar Racetrack, a race that track officials eventually renamed the Clement L. Hirsch Handicap in his honor. Hirsch retired Magical Maiden to broodmare duty. She is the granddam of 2009 Kentucky Derby entrant Papa Clem and 2021 Breeders’ Cup Filly and Mare Sprinter winner Ce Ce through her GI-winning daughter Miss Houdini. Papa Clem and Ce Ce are both owned by Hirsch's son Bo Hirsch. The name "Papa Clem" stems from the name Hirsch's grandchildren called him, and that horse was trained by Gary Stute, Warren Stute's nephew.

While successful racing horses, Hirsch is best remembered in the sport as a co-founder and President of the Oak Tree Racing Association. In 1968, the operators of Del Mar Racetrack in Del Mar, California decided to cancel their fall racing program and to host only a summer meet. Hirsch, along with businessman/racehorse owner Louis R. Rowan, veterinarian Dr. Jack Robbins, and other racing enthusiasts, formed the Oak Tree Racing Association to annually host a fall meet at Santa Anita Park. It proved to be highly successful, and Hirsch served as its president from its inception until his death in 2000.

In 1998, Hirsch was awarded the Commissioners Cup by the National Thoroughbred Racing Association. Following his death in 2000, the Oak Tree Racing Association honored him by changing the Oak Tree Turf Championship Stakes to the Clement L. Hirsch Memorial Turf Championship for the 2000 renewal.

Hirsch was selected for induction into the National Museum of Racing and Hall of Fame in 2024 as a "Pillar of the Turf."

== Personal life ==
In 1963, Hirsch and his second wife Edith Mack Hirsch were divorced. She remarried to actor Desi Arnaz. Married four times, he had six children from his marriages.
