= El Encino Stakes =

- Class: Discontinued Grade 2 Stakes
- Location: Santa Anita Park; Arcadia, California
- Inaugurated: 1954
- Race type: Thoroughbred – Flat racing
- Website: www.santaanita.com

Race information
- Distance: 1 1/16 miles
- Surface: Dirt
- Track: left-handed
- Qualification: Four-year-old Fillies
- Weight: Assigned
- Purse: $150,000

The El Encino Stakes was an American Thoroughbred horse race run between 1954 and 2011 at Santa Anita Park in Arcadia, California. Open to four-year-old fillies, it was raced over a distance of 1 1/16 miles (8.5 furlongs) on the synthetic Cushion Track surface. A Grade 2 event, it last offered a purse of $150,000

Part of Santa Anita Park's La Cañada Series of races, the El Encino Stakes was open to newly turning/turned 4-year-old fillies. Run at an increasing distance, the series began with the Grade I La Brea Stakes at 7 furlongs at the end of December followed by the El Encino Stakes at 1 1/16 miles (8.5 furlongs) in mid January, then the Grade 2 La Cañada Stakes at 1 1/8 miles (9 furlongs) in mid February. Created in 1975, only three fillies have ever won the series: Taisez Vous (1978), Mitterand (1985), and Got Koko (2003). The Santa Anita Park counterpart for male horses is the Strub Series.

Prior to 1976, the race was open to horses of either sex aged four and up.

The El Encino was inaugurated in 1954 as a handicap race on dirt at 1 1/16 miles. From 1955 through 1957 it was raced on turf at a distance of 1 1/4 miles after which it was suspended until 1968 when it returned as a 1 1/16 miles claiming stakes. There was no race in 1970 but returned the following year. In 1974 and 1975 it was modified to a distance 1 1/8 miles before being changed permanently in 1976 to 1 1/16 miles and restricted to four-year-old fillies.

== Records ==
Speed record 1:40.61 @ 1 1/16 miles): Zenyatta (2008)

Most wins by a jockey:

- 5 – Chris McCarron (1983, 1986, 1991, 2000)

Most wins by a trainer:

- 4 – John Shirreffs (1999, 2006, 2008, 2009)

Most wins by an owner:

- 3 – Golden Eagle Farm (1976, 1983, 1998)

== Winners ==
Year	Winner	Age	Jockey	Trainer	Owner	Dist. (Miles)	Time	Win $	Gr.
2011	Always a Princess	4	Rafael Bejarano	Bob Baffert	Arnold Zetcher	1-1/16 m	1:41.47	$90,000	G2
2010	Pretty Unusual	4	Chantal Sutherland	Barry Abrams	M. Auerbach, LLC, Marie Goda, Jack Klugman	1-1/16 m	1:43.72	$90,000	G2
2009	Life Is Sweet	4	Garrett K. Gomez	John Shirreffs	Pam & Martin Wygod	1-1/16 m	1:41.30	$90,000	G2
2008	Zenyatta	4	David Flores	John Shirreffs	Ann & Jerry Moss	1-1/16 m	1:40.61	$90,000	G2
2007	Sugar Shake	4	David R. Flores	Robert J. Frankel	Stronach Stables	1-1/16 m	1:43.70	$90,000	G2
2006	Proposed	4	Pat Valenzuela	John Shirreffs	Pam & Martin Wygod	1-1/16 m	1:44.32	$90,000	G2
2005	Girl Warrior	4	Victor Espinoza	Neil D. Drysdale	Anthony Speelman	1-1/16 m	1:42.76	$90,000	G2
2004	Victory Encounter	4	Mike E. Smith	John W. Sadler	Tom Mankiewicz	1-1/16 m	1:42.52	$90,000	G2
2003	Got Koko	4	Alex Solis	Bruce Headley	Aase Headley & Paul Leung	1-1/16 m	1:42.25	$90,000	G2
2002	Affluent	4	Ed Delahoussaye	Ron McAnally	Janis R. Whitham	1-1/16 m	1:42.60	$90,000	G2
2001	Chilukki	4	Gary Stevens	Bob Baffert	Stonerside Stable	1-1/16 m	1:42.55	$90,000	G2
2000	Olympic Charmer	4	Chris McCarron	Ron McAnally	Deborah McAnally	1-1/16 m	1:42.71	$97,470	G2
1999	Manistique	4	Gary Stevens	John Shirreffs	505 Farms	1-1/16 m	1:43.10	$90,000	G2
1998	Fleet Lady	4	Garrett K. Gomez	Jerry Hollendorfer	Golden Eagle Farm	1-1/16 m	1:43.04	$96,840	G2
1997	Belle's Flag	4	Corey Nakatani	Darrell Vienna	Ernest Auerbach	1-1/16 m	1:41.61	$82,650	G2
1996	Jewel Princess	4	Alex Solis	Wallace Dollase	Martha J. & Richard J. Stephen	1-1/16 m	1:41.94	$78,800	G2
1995	Klassy Kim	4	Kent Desormeaux	Melvin F. Stute	Bill M. Thomas	1-1/16 m	1:42.43	$61,400	G2
1994	Supah Gem	4	Corey Nakatani	Wallace Dollase	Martha Perez & Richard Stephen	1-1/16 m	1:41.33	$64,500	G2
1993	Pacific Squall	4	Chris McCarron	J. Paco Gonzalez	McCaffery & Toffan	1-1/16 m	1:45.67	$63,900	G2
1992	Exchange	4	Laffit Pincay Jr.	William Spawr	Sidney H. Craig	1-1/16 m	1:43.32	$67,000	G2
1991	A Wild Ride	4	Chris McCarron	D. Wayne Lukas	Calumet Farm	1-1/16 m	1:42.40	$63,500	G2
1990	Akinemod	4	Gary Stevens	Jerry M. Fanning	El Rancho de Jaklin	1-1/16 m	1:41.20	$62,900	G2
1989	Goodbye Halo	4	Pat Day	Charles Whittingham	Alex Campbell Jr. & Arthur B. Hancock III	1-1/16 m	1:41.80	$60,200	G3
1988	By Land By Sea	4	Fernando Toro	Gary F. Jones	Jayeff "B" Stable & Gary F. Jones	1-1/16 m	1:41.60	$64,300	G3
1987	Seldom Seen Sue	4	Bill Shoemaker	Gary F. Jones	Christopher Drakos, Issac F. Fredrick, John D. Howard	1-1/16 m	1:43.00	$61,850	G3
1986	Lady's Secret	4	Chris McCarron	D. Wayne Lukas	Joyce F. Klein	1-1/16 m	1:41.80	$65,850	G3
1985	Mitterand	4	Ed Delahoussaye	Randy Winick	Silver Star Stable & Randy Winick	1-1/16 m	1:42.00	$61,600	G3
1984	Lovlier Linda	4	Bill Shoemaker	Willard L. Proctor	William R. Hawn	1-1/16 m	1:42.00	$51,250	G3
1983	Beautiful Glass	4	Chris McCarron	Gary F. Jones	Golden Eagle Farm	1-1/16 m	1:41.20	$50,550	G3
1982	Edge	4	Cash Asmussen	Willard L. Proctor	William Haggin Perry	1-1/16 m	1:41.20	$68,000	G3
1981	Princess Karenda	4	Ed Delahoussaye	Gene Cleveland	William S. Farish III & Warner L. Jones Jr.	1-1/16 m	1:42.00	$49,650	G3
1980	It's In The Air	4	Laffit Pincay Jr.	Laz Barrera	Harbor View Farm	1-1/16 m	1:41.20	$38,750	G3
1979	B. Thoughtful	4	Donald Pierce	Robert L. Wheeler	Mrs. Walter Haefner	1-1/16 m	1:41.60	$38,250	
1978	Taisez Vous	4	Donald Pierce	Robert L. Wheeler	Vernon D. & Ann Eachus	1-1/16 m	1:41.80	$30,200	
1977	Woodsome	4	Mark Sellers	Stephen A. DiMauro	Robert E. Sangster	1-1/16 m	1:42.20	$27,450	
1976	Fascinating Girl	4	Sandy Hawley	A. Thomas Doyle	Golden Eagle Farm	1-1/16 m	1:42.40	$18,850	
1975	Triggairo	6	Donald Pierce	John Coffee	Roy Rogers	1-1/8 m	1:49.40	$19,700	
1974	Wild World	5	Bill Shoemaker	Robert J. Frankel	Marion R. Frankel	1-1/8 m	1:49.80	$18,150	
1973	Class A	5	Dennis Tierney	Farrell W. Jones	Cossack Farm	1-1/16 m	1:44.60	$18,950	
1972	Thorn	4	Johnny Sellers	Pancho Martin	Sigmund Sommer	1-1/16 m	1:42.00	$19,550	
1971	Efa	5	Donald Pierce	Gordon C. Campbell	R. G. "Bob" Shaw	1-1/16 m	1:41.80	$16,900	
1970	Race not held								
1969	Gene's Dancer	4	Earlie Fires	J. Bert Sonnier	Verna Lea Farm (Gene Goff)	1-1/16 m	1:43.40	$15,200	
1968	Hill Shine	4	Álvaro Pineda	William B. Finnegan	El Peco Ranch	1-1/16 m	1:42.60	$14,650	
1958	1967	Race not held							
1957	Blue Volt	8	Bill Shoemaker	Edward D. Cox	Altandor Stable (Albert Yank) & Edward D. Cox	1-1/4 m (t)	2:07.40	$14,150	
1956	Free Stride	4	Rogelio Trejos	C. Ralph West	M/M Bert W. Martin	1-1/4 m (t)	2:00.40	$14,350	
1955	Surgente	6	Rogelio Trejos	G. M. Small	Argentine Turf Stable	1-1/4 m (t)	2:04.00	$15,400	
1954	Dixie Lad	5	Eddie Arcaro	Horace A. Jones	Calumet Farm	1-1/16 m	1:43.40	$10,950	

*In 1998, I Ain't Bluffing won the race but was disqualified and set back to third.
