= La Cañada Stakes =

American horse race run

- Class: Grade III
- Location: Santa Anita Park; Arcadia, California, USA
- Inaugurated: 1975
- Race type: Thoroughbred – Flat racing
- Website: Santa Anita Park

Race information
- Distance: 1 1/16 miles
- Surface: Dirt
- Track: left-handed
- Qualification: Fillies and mares age four and older
- Weight: 124 lbs with allowances
- Purse: US$100,000 (since 2024)

The La Cañada Stakes is a Grade III American thoroughbred horse race for fillies and mares age four-years-old and older over a distance of one-and-one-sixteenth miles on the dirt track held annually in January at Santa Anita Park in Arcadia, California, USA. The event currently offers a purse of US$100,000.

== History ==
The event was named after a 1843 Mexican land grant known as Rancho La Cañada in the San Rafael Hills and Crescenta Valley of Southern California. The name means "ranch of the canyon". The rancho included the current day city of La Cañada Flintridge.

The inaugural running of the event was on 1 February 1975 over a distance of one-and-one-sixteenth miles and was won by the 1974 U.S. Champion Three-Year-Old Filly Chris Evert who carried 128 pounds, winning by a nose as the 13/10 favorite over Mercy Dee with Lucky Spell in third place 1 3/4 lengths away in a time of 1:41 3/5. The winning time recorded for the distance continues today to be the stakes record.

The following year, the distance of the event was increased to 1 1/8 miles. The event was run at this distance until 2011.

Given the quality of competition after the first two runnings of the event in 1977 the American Graded Stakes Committee classified the event as Grade II.

In 1978 Santa Anita Park administration created the La Cañada Series, a series of races for newly turning/turned 4-year-old fillies and run at an increasing distance. The series begins with the La Brea Stakes at 7 furlongs followed by the Grade II El Encino Stakes at 1 1/16 miles in mid January, then the upgraded Grade I La Cañada Stakes at 1 1/8 miles in mid February. Until the series ended in 2011 when the El Encino Stakes was discontinued, only three fillies had ever won all three races: Taisez Vous (1978), Mitterand (1985), and Got Koko (2003). The Santa Anita Park counterpart series for male horses is the Strub Series.

In 1990 the event was downgraded Grade II.

For three years (2008–10) the event was held on the synthetic All-Weather course which had been installed at Santa Anita Park.

With the discontinuation of the El Encino Stakes in 2012 the La Cañada Stakes distance was decreased to 1 1/16 miles and the race was scheduled in mid January.

In 2018 the event was run at a distance of one mile.

In 2019 the event was downgraded Grade III.

The 1986 winner Lady's Secret had an outstanding year culminating with a victory in the Grade I Breeders' Cup Distaff and winning the U.S. Champion Older Filly award and being voted as United States Horse of the Year. The 1996 winner Jewel Princess also won the Breeders' Cup Distaff and winning the U.S. Champion Older Filly award and being voted as United States Horse of the Year. While the 2000 Breeders' Cup Distaff winner Spain won two legs of the La Cañada Series and finished second in the El Encino Stakes.

== Records ==
Speed record:

- 1 1/16 miles: 1:41.60 – Chris Evert (1975)
- 1 1/8 miles: 1:47.60 – Glorious Song (1980), Safe Play (1982)

Margins:

- 13 1/2 lengths – As Time Goes By (2022)

Most wins by a jockey:

- 5 – Gary Stevens (1987, 1994, 1999, 2002, 2016)

Most wins by a trainer:

- 6 – Bob Baffert (2004, 2011, 2017, 2022, 2025, 2026)

Most wins by an owner:

- 2 – Eugene V. Klein (1986, 1987)
- 2 – The Thoroughbred Corporation (2001, 2004)

== Winners ==
Year	Winner	Jockey	Trainer	Owner	Distance	Time	Purse	Grade	Ref
2026	Nafisa	Kazushi Kimura	Bob Baffert	Zedan Racing Stables	1 1/16 miles	1:44.77	$100,500	III	
2025	Cavalieri	Juan J. Hernandez	Bob Baffert	Speedway Stables	1 1/16 miles	1:44.15	$100,500	III	
2024	Desert Dawn	Flavien Prat	Philip D'Amato	H & E Ranch	1 1/16 miles	1:44.05	$100,000	III	
2023	Kirstenbosch	Kazushi Kimura	John W. Sadler	Keith Abrahams	1 1/16 miles	1:44.19	$200,500	III	
2022	As Time Goes By	Flavien Prat	Bob Baffert	Michael Tabor, Mrs. John Magnier & Derrick Smith	1 1/16 miles	1:44.31	$200,000	III	
2021	Sanenus (CHI)	Umberto Rispoli	Michael W. McCarthy	Matriarca	1 1/16 miles	1:45.44	$201,000	III	
2020	Queen Bee to You	Ruben Fuentes	Andrew Lerner	An Equal Amount Of Blueberries & Adam Vali	1 1/16 miles	1:44.36	$200,500	III	
2019	Escape Clause	Tyler Baze	Don Schnell	Don Schnell	1 1/16 miles	1:41.89	$100,351	III	
2018	Mopotism	Mario Gutierrez	Doug F. O'Neill	Reddam Racing	1 mile	1:37.29	$201,035	II	
2017	Vale Dori (ARG)	Mike E. Smith	Bob Baffert	Sheikh Mohammed bin Khalifa al Maktoum	1 1/16 miles	1:44.95	$200,000	II	
2016	Taris	Gary L. Stevens	Simon Callaghan	Derrick Smith, Mrs. John Magnier & Michael Tabor	1 1/16 miles	1:44.38	$196,250	II	
2015	Thegirlinthatsong	Rafael Bejarano	Jerry Hollendorfer	Tim & Peter Russo, Jerry Hollendorfer & Daniel J. Gatto	1 1/16 miles	1:43.84	$200,500	II	
2014	Spellbound	Victor Espinoza	Richard E. Mandella	Ramona Bass, Claiborne Farm & Adele Dilschneider	1 1/16 miles	1:43.14	$200,500	II	
2013	More Chocolate	Garrett K. Gomez	John W. Sadler	Michael Talla	1 1/16 miles	1:42.59	$150,250	II	
2012	Include Me Out	Joseph Talamo	Ronald W. Ellis	Jay Em Ess Stable	1 1/16 miles	1:41.89	$150,000	II	
2011	Always a Princess	Martin Garcia	Bob Baffert	Arnold Zetcher	1 1/8 miles	1:48.36	$147,000	II	
2010	Striking Dancer	Alex O. Solis	Kenneth G. McPeek	Steve Stan Stables	1 1/8 miles	1:48.48	$150,000	II	
2009	Life Is Sweet	Garrett K. Gomez	John Shirreffs	Pam & Martin Wygod	1 1/8 miles	1:49.70	$200,000	II	
2008	Dawn After Dawn	Garrett K. Gomez	John W. Sadler	Ike & Dawn Thrash	1 1/8 miles	1:50.37	$200,000	II	
2007	Balance	Victor Espinoza	David E. Hofmans	Amerman Racing	1 1/8 miles	1:49.41	$200,000	II	
2006	Seafree	Pat Valenzuela	Robert J. Frankel	Edmund A. Gann	1 1/8 miles	1:50.04	$200,000	II	
2005	Tarlow	Pat Valenzuela	John Shirreffs	Ann & Jerome Moss	1 1/8 miles	1:48.64	$200,000	II	
2004	§ Cat Fighter	Alex O. Solis	Bob Baffert	The Thoroughbred Corporation	1 1/8 miles	1:50.41	$200,000	II	
2003	Got Koko	Alex O. Solis	Bruce Headley	Aase Headley & Paul Leung	1 1/8 miles	1:48.41	$200,000	II	
2002	Summer Colony	Gary L. Stevens	Mark A. Hennig	Edward P. Evans	1 1/8 miles	1:49.26	$200,000	II	
2001	Spain	Victor Espinoza	D. Wayne Lukas	The Thoroughbred Corporation	1 1/8 miles	1:49.74	$200,000	II	
2000	Scholars Studio	Corey Nakatani	Martin F. Jones	King Edward Racing Stable	1 1/8 miles	1:49.14	$200,000	II	
1999	Manistique	Gary L. Stevens	John Shirreffs	505 Farms	1 1/8 miles	1:48.81	$200,000	II	
1998	Fleet Lady	Garrett K. Gomez	Jerry Hollendorfer	Golden Eagle Farm	1 1/8 miles	1:48.59	$200,000	II	
1997	Belle's Flag	Corey Nakatani	Darrell Vienna	Ernest Auerbach	1 1/8 miles	1:48.28	$213,200	II	
1996	Jewel Princess	Alex O. Solis	Wallace Dollase	Richard J. & Martha J. Stephen	1 1/8 miles	1:49.42	$209,900	II	
1995	Dianes Halo	Corey Nakatani	David C. Cross Jr.	Diane Garber	1 1/8 miles	1:49.35	$213,800	II	
1994	Stalcreek	Gary L. Stevens	David Bernstein	Gaylord Ailshie & Joseph Shields	1 1/8 miles	1:48.85	$205,000	II	
1993	Alysbelle	Eddie Delahoussaye	Jack Van Berg	Clarence Scharbauer Jr.	1 1/8 miles	1:49.85	$220,850	II	
1992	Exchange	Laffit Pincay Jr.	William Spawr	Sidney Craig	1 1/8 miles	1:49.96	$218,250	II	
1991	Fit to Scout	Julio A. Garcia	Jack Van Berg	Robert M. Snell	1 1/8 miles	1:48.50	$216,700	II	
1990	Gorgeous	Eddie Delahoussaye	Neil D. Drysdale	Robert N. Clay	1 1/8 miles	1:50.00	$212,000	II	
1989	Goodbye Halo	Pat Day	Charles E. Whittingham	Alex G. Campbell Jr. & Arthur B. Hancock III	1 1/8 miles	1:54.40	$215,300	I	
1988	Hollywood Glitter	Laffit Pincay Jr.	Gary F. Jones	Joanne Batchelor	1 1/8 miles	1:49.20	$161,700	I	
1987	Family Style	Gary L. Stevens	D. Wayne Lukas	Eugene V. Klein	1 1/8 miles	1:49.60	$162,300	I	
1986	Lady's Secret	Chris McCarron	D. Wayne Lukas	Mr. & Mrs. Eugene V. Klein	1 1/8 miles	1:49.80	$205,700	I	
1985	Mitterand	Eddie Delahoussaye	Randy Winick	Silver Star Stable & Arnold Winick	1 1/8 miles	1:48.80	$208,200	I	
1984	Sweet Diane	Ray Sibille	Robert J. Frankel	Harry W. Stone, Pinwheel Farm & Milton Bronson	1 1/8 miles	1:49.20	$198,950	I	
1983	Avigaition	Eddie Delahoussaye	Vivian M. Pulliam	C. Norman Pulliam	1 1/8 miles	1:49.80	$169,400	I	
1982	Safe Play	Don Brumfield	Harvey L. Vanier	Dr. Carl Lauer & Nancy A. Vanier	1 1/8 miles	1:47.60	$168,300	I	
1981	Summer Siren	Marco Castaneda	Louis R. Carno	Mr. & Mrs. Thomas M. Cavanagh	1 1/8 miles	1:48.60	$142,500	I	
1980	Glorious Song (CAN)	Chris McCarron	Gerald W. Belanger Jr.	Frank Stronach	1 1/8 miles	1:47.60	$136,600	I	
1979	B. Thoughtful	Donald Pierce	Robert L. Wheeler	Mrs. Walter Haefner	1 1/8 miles	1:48.80	$114,900	I	
1978	Taisez Vous	Donald Pierce	Robert L. Wheeler	Vernon D. & Ann Eachus	1 1/8 miles	1:49.80	$110,000	I	
1977	Lucie Manet	Bill Shoemaker	Jaime Villagomez	John & Donald Valpredo	1 1/8 miles	1:48.20	$113,300	II	
1976	Raise Your Skirts	Bill Shoemaker	Barney Willis	Harris Farms, Virginia Willis & Kemper Marley	1 1/8 miles	1:48.40	$83,900		
1975	Chris Evert	Jorge Velasquez	Joseph A. Trovato	Carl Rosen	1 1/16 miles	1:41.60	$57,900		

Legend:
All Weather Track Dirt

Notes:
§ Ran as an entry

== See also ==
List of American and Canadian Graded races
