= La Brea Stakes =

- Class: Grade I
- Location: Santa Anita Park; Arcadia, California
- Inaugurated: 1974
- Race type: Thoroughbred - Flat racing
- Website: Santa Anita Park

Race information
- Distance: 7 furlongs
- Surface: Dirt
- Track: left-handed
- Qualification: Three-year-old Fillies
- Weight: 124 lbs with allowances
- Purse: $300,000 (since 2011)

The La Brea Stakes is a Grade I American thoroughbred horse race for three-year-old fillies over a distance of seven furlongs on the dirt track held annually in late December at Santa Anita Park in Arcadia, California, USA. The event currently offers a purse of US$300,000.

== History ==
The event is named for the area in Southern California called La Brea, noted for the La Brea Tar Pits in the middle of the city of Los Angeles. The word "brea" is Spanish for tar.

The inaugural running of the event was on 16 January 1974 for four-year-old horses over a distance of 1 1/16 miles and was won by Mr. & Mrs Carl Galea's 11/1 longshot Niner Power by a margin of 2 1/2 lengths over First Majesty with Handsome Native 1/2 length back in third in a time of 1:43 4/5. The event was held in 1975 in January for four-year-olds again with Bobby Murcer winning. However, track management scheduled the event for the 1975–76 Santa Anita Winter meet in December for three-year-old horses and when it came time to the draw entries for the race the event was split into divisions. Hence, for the 1975 calendar year the event was raced three times. In 1976 the event was held on the last day of the year for three-year-olds and the winner Kirby Lane would go on the following year and win the Grade II San Antonio Stakes and the Grade I Charles H. Strub Stakes.

For the next season's winter meeting, Santa Anita scheduled the event in January and that the conditions of the event were for four-year-old fillies at a shorter distance of seven furlongs. Therefore, for the calendar year 1977, the event was not held. The first running as a fillies event the winner was Taisez Vous by an easy 6 lengths.

The La Brea Stakes was part of Santa Anita Park's La Cañada Series of races open to newly turning/turned 4-year-old fillies and run at an increasing distance. The series begins with the La Brea Stakes at 7 furlongs followed by the Grade II El Encino Stakes at 1 1/16 miles in mid January, then the Grade II La Cañada Stakes at 1 1/8 miles in mid February. Until the series ended in 2011 when the El Encino Stakes was discontinued, only three fillies had ever won all three races: Taisez Vous (1978), Mitterand (1985), and Got Koko (2003). The Santa Anita Park counterpart series for male horses is the Strub Series.

Due to the scheduling near the New Year period, the event was sometimes scheduled in late December as a three-year-old fillies event or in early January as a four-year-old fillies event, such as in 1982, 1985 and 1990 and thus the event would not be held in the calendar year - 1984 and 1986.

American Triple Crown winner Secretariat's daughter Terlingua won this event in 1980. Later as a broodmare her offspring included a champion sire in Storm Cat (1999, 2000).

In 1983 the American Graded Stakes Committee classified the event as Grade III.

Also American Triple Crown winner Seattle Slew's daughter Savannah Slew won this event in December 1985. Although Savannah Slew retired after this event, Lady's Secret whom she defeated into second place in 1986 had an outstanding year culminating with a victory in the Grade I Breeders' Cup Distaff and winning the U.S. Champion Older Filly award and being voted as United States Horse of the Year.

Prior to winning this event in 1988 Very Subtle had won the Grade I Breeders' Cup Sprint at Hollywood Park. Very Subtle dispatched her opposition by a record winning margin of nine lengths which continues to date to be the largest margin of victory.

In 1991 the event was run in split divisions for the second time and since then has been scheduled only in December.

In 1994 the event was upgraded to Grade II and to the highest classification of Grade I in 1997.

== Records ==
Speed record:

- 7 furlongs: 1:20.33 – Switch (2010)

Margins:

- 9 lengths – Very Subtle (1988)

Most wins by a jockey:

- 5 – Chris McCarron (1982 (2), 1991, 1995, 1996)
- 5 – Gary Stevens (1987, 1990, 1995, 1998, 2013)
- 5 – Mike E. Smith (2004, 2007, 2015, 2017, 2019)

Most wins by a trainer:

- 10 – Bob Baffert (1992, 1998, 1999, 2005, 2006, 2008, 2012, 2021, 2022, 2025)

Most wins by an owner:

- 4 – Michael E. Pegram (1992, 1999, 2005, 2025)

== Winners ==
Year	Winner	Jockey	Trainer	Owner	Distance	Time	Purse	Grade	Ref
2025	Usha	Juan J. Hernandez	Bob Baffert	Michael E. Pegram, Karl Watson, Paul Weitman	7 furlongs	1:21.68	$302,500	I	
2024	Kopion	Kazushi Kimura	Richard E. Mandella	Spendthrift Farm	7 furlongs	1:22.08	$301,500	I	
2023	Daddysruby	Juan J. Hernandez	Peter L. Miller	Jethorse, Wachtel Stable & Gary Barber	7 furlongs	1:23.06	$302,000	I	
2022	Fun to Dream	Juan J. Hernandez	Bob Baffert	Natalie J. Baffert & Connie Pageler	7 furlongs	1:21.99	$301,000	I	
2021	Kalypso	John Velazquez	Bob Baffert	David A. Bernsen, Gainsway Stable, Rockingham Ranch & Chad Littlefield	7 furlongs	1:24.78	$301,000	I	
2020	Fair Maiden	Ricardo Gonzalez	Eoin G. Harty	Godolphin	7 furlongs	1:22.17	$302,500	I	
2019	Hard Not to Love	Mike E. Smith	John Shirreffs	Mercedes Stables, West Point Thoroughbreds, Scott Dilworth, Dorothy & David Ingordo & Steve F. Mooney	7 furlongs	1:22.17	$301,404	I	
2018	Spiced Perfection	Flavien Prat	Brian J. Koriner	Dare To Dream Stable	7 furlongs	1:23.54	$301,035	I	
2017	Unique Bella	Mike E. Smith	Jerry Hollendorfer	Don Alberto Stable	7 furlongs	1:21.49	$301,035	I	
2016	Constellation	Flavien Prat	Jerry Hollendorfer	LNJ Foxwoods	7 furlongs	1:21.83	$301,035	I	
2015	Birdatthewire	Mike E. Smith	Dale L. Romans	Forum Racing IV	7 furlongs	1:23.31	$301,000	I	
2014	Sam's Sister	Elvis Trujillo	Jerry Hollendorfer	Mark Dedomenico, Jerry Hollendorfer & George Todaro	7 furlongs	1:22.52	$301,000	I	
2013	Heir Kitty	Gary L. Stevens	Peter L. Miller	David A. Bernsen & Paul Makin	7 furlongs	1:21.47	$300,250	I	
2012	Book Review	Rafael Bejarano	Bob Baffert	Mary & Gary West	7 furlongs	1:22.41	$300,500	I	
2011	Teddy's Promise	Victor Espinoza	Ronald W. Ellis	Ted & Judy Nichols	7 furlongs	1:20.47	$300,000	I	
2010	Switch	Joel Rosario	John W. Sadler	C R K Stable	7 furlongs	1:20.33	$250,000	I	
2009	Evita Argentina	Joel Rosario	John W. Sadler	Halo Farms & Three Sisters Thoroughbreds	7 furlongs	1:21.78	$300,000	I	
2008	Indian Blessing	John R. Velazquez	Bob Baffert	Patti & Hal J. Earnhardt	7 furlongs	1:20.89	$250,000	I	
2007	Dearest Trickski	Mike E. Smith	John W. Sadler	Tom Mankiewicz	7 furlongs	1:21.09	$250,000	I	
2006	Downthedustyroad	Jon Court	Bob Baffert	Zayat Stables	7 furlongs	1:21.40	$250,000	I	
2005	Pussycat Doll	Garrett K. Gomez	Bob Baffert	Michael E. Pegram	7 furlongs	1:21.36	$250,000	I	
2004	Alphabet Kisses	Mike E. Smith	Martin F. Jones	Harris Farms	7 furlongs	1:21.38	$250,000	I	
2003	Island Fashion	Kent J. Desormeaux	Marcelo Polanco	Everest Stables	7 furlongs	1:22.12	$250,000	I	
2002	Got Koko	Alex O. Solis	Bruce Headley	Aase Headley & Paul Leung	7 furlongs	1:22.57	$200,000	I	
2001	Affluent	Eddie Delahoussaye	Ron McAnally	Janis R. Whitham	7 furlongs	1:21.29	$200,000	I	
2000	Spain	Victor Espinoza	D. Wayne Lukas	The Thoroughbred Corporation	7 furlongs	1:22.27	$200,000	I	
1999	Hookedonthefeelin	David R. Flores	Bob Baffert	Michael E. Pegram	7 furlongs	1:21.84	$200,000	I	
1998	Magical Allure	Gary L. Stevens	Bob Baffert	Mr. & Mrs. John C. Mabee	7 furlongs	1:22.06	$200,000	I	
1997	I Ain't Bluffing	Eddie Delahoussaye	Ronald W. Ellis	Samantha, Jan and Mace Siegel	7 furlongs	1:21.23	$165,900	I	
1996	Hidden Lake	Chris McCarron	Walter R. Greenman	Dennis E. & Estate of Jim E. Weir	7 furlongs	1:22.00	$130,900	II	
1995	Exotic Wood	Chris McCarron	Ronald W. Ellis	Pam & Martin Wygod	7 furlongs	1:21.57	$130,250	II	
1994	Top Rung	Gary L. Stevens	Willard L. Proctor	Glen Hill Farm	7 furlongs	1:21.84	$108,700	II	
1993	Mamselle Bebette	Corey Nakatani	Jack Van Berg	Big Train Farm	7 furlongs	1:20.45	$110,900	III	
1992	Arches of Gold	Eddie Delahoussaye	Bob Baffert	Michael E. Pegram & Bob Roth	7 furlongs	1:21.28	$109,800	III	
1991	D'Or Ruckus	Chris McCarron	Gerald C. Moerman	J B S Stable	7 furlongs	1:22.05	$82,550	III	Division 1
1991	Teresa Mc	Pat Valenzuela	Greg Gilchrist	Harris Farms	7 furlongs	1:23.05	$82,550	III	Division 2
1990	Brought To Mind	Alex O. Solis	Ron McAnally	Tadahiro Hotehama	7 furlongs	1:21.60	$110,000	III	December
1990	Akinemod	Gary L. Stevens	Jerry M. Fanning	El Rancho de Jaklin	7 furlongs	1:21.60	$107,650	III	January
1989	Variety Baby	Corey Black	Bruce Headley	Kjell H. Qvale	7 furlongs	1:21.60	$82,800	III	
1988	Very Subtle	Pat Valenzuela	Melvin F. Stute	Ben Rochelle	7 furlongs	1:21.60	$103,500	III	
1987	Family Style	Gary L. Stevens	D. Wayne Lukas	Eugene V. Klein	7 furlongs	1:22.60	$80,450	III	
1986	Race not held								
1985	Savannah Slew	Bill Shoemaker	Ron McAnally	Allen E. Paulson	7 furlongs	1:22.40	$66,150	III	December
1985	Mitterand	Eddie Delahoussaye	Randy Winick	Silver Star Stable & Randy Winick	7 furlongs	1:21.80	$66,950	III	January
1984	Race not held								
1983	Lovlier Linda	Bill Shoemaker	Willard L. Proctor	William R. Hawn	7 furlongs	1:22.20	$67,700	III	
1982	Beautiful Glass	Chris McCarron	Gary F. Jones	Golden Eagle Farm	7 furlongs	1:21.00	$69,450		December
1982	Nell's Briquette	Chris McCarron	Loren Rettele	Triple L. Stables	7 furlongs	1:25.80	$67,150		January
1981	Dynanite	Bill Shoemaker	John W. Russell	Mrs. Harold Cole	7 furlongs	1:21.40	$54,250		
1980	Terlingua	Darrel G. McHargue	D. Wayne Lukas	Barry A. Beal & L. Robert French Jr.	7 furlongs	1:20.80	$53,850		
1979	Great Lady M.	Laffit Pincay Jr.	D. Wayne Lukas	Robert H. Spreen	7 furlongs	1:22.60	$58,300		
1978	Taisez Vous	Donald Pierce	Robert L. Wheeler	Vernon & Ann Eachus	7 furlongs	1:22.80	$44,700		
1977	Race not held								
1976	Kirby Lane	Laffit Pincay Jr.	Laz Barrera	Gedney Farms	1 1/16 miles	1:45.20	$39,500		
1975	Featherfoot	Bill Shoemaker	Laz Barrera	Harbor View Farm	1 1/16 miles	1:42.20	$22,025	December	Division 1
1975	Big Destiny	Sandy Hawley	Sidney Martin	David J. Foster	1 1/16 miles	1:42.80	$22,325	December	Division 2
1975	Bobby Murcer	Eddie Belmonte	Joe Trovato	Carl Rosen	1 1/16 miles	1:43.40	$34,300	January	
1974	Niner Power	Steve J. Valdez	Buster Millerick	Mr. & Mrs Carl Galea	1 1/16 miles	1:43.80	$33,850		

Legend:
All Weather Track Dirt

== See also ==
List of American and Canadian Graded races
