= Sweet Catomine =

American-bred Thoroughbred racehorse

- Sire: Storm Cat
- Grandsire: Storm Bird
- Dam: Sweet Life
- Damsire: Kris S
- Sex: Mare
- Foaled: February 14, 2002
- Country: United States
- Colour: Bay
- Breeder: Pam & Martin J. Wygod
- Owner: Pam & Martin J. Wygod
- Trainer: Julio Canani
- Record: 7: 5-1-0
- Earnings: $1,059,600

Major wins
- Del Mar Debutante Stakes (2004); Oak Leaf Stakes (2004); Breeders' Cup Juvenile Fillies (2004); Santa Ysabel Stakes (2005); Santa Anita Oaks (2005)

Awards
- American Champion Two-Year-Old Filly (2004)

Sweet Catomine (foaled February 14, 2002) is an American Thoroughbred racehorse and broodmare. After finishing second on her racecourse debut as a two-year-old in July 2004, she emerged as the best juvenile filly of her generation in the United States, winning the Del Mar Debutante Stakes, Oak Leaf Stakes and Breeders' Cup Juvenile Fillies before being voted American Champion Two-Year-Old Filly. In the following spring she won the Santa Ysabel Stakes and Santa Anita Oaks and was considered a serious contender for the Kentucky Derby before finishing fifth in the Santa Anita Derby and was retired from racing shortly afterwards. Her run in the Santa Anita Derby was controversial as there were allegations that her connections had not been fully open about her training problems. The complaints were dismissed after a formal hearing by the local racing authority.

== Background ==
Sweet Catomine is a big, powerful bay mare bred in Kentucky by her owners Pam & Martin J. Wygod. She was sired by Storm Cat the Leading sire in North America in 1999 and 2000 whose other offspring included Aljabr, Cat Thief, Giant's Causeway, Hold That Tiger, One Cool Cat, Storm Flag Flying and Tabasco Cat. Sweet Catomine's dam Sweet Life, bred and owned by the Wygods, won four races and finished second in the Grade I Beverly Hills Handicap. She became a highly successful broodmare, later producing the Breeders' Cup Distaff winner Life Is Sweet. Like her dam, Sweet Catomine was sent into training with Julio Canani.

== Racing career ==
=== 2004: two-year-old season ===
Sweet Catomine made her track debut in a maiden race over five and a half furlongs at Del Mar on July 31. Ridden by David Flores she started at odds of 5.7/1 and finished second, five lengths behind the winner She's Salty after racing on the wide outside until the stretch. Victor Espinoza took over the ride when the filly was moved up in class for the Grade I Del Mar Debutante Stakes over seven furlongs on August 28. Coupled with her stable companion Proposed, she started the 1.6/1 favorite ahead of the Landaluce Stakes winner Souvenir Gift. The filly started poorly but moved up into third place entering the straight and took the lead inside the final furlong to win by three quarters of a length from Souvenir Gift. Sweet Catomine was ridden by Corey Nakatani when the filly contested the Grade II Oak Leaf Stakes at Santa Anita Park on October 2 and started the 2/1 second favorite behind Splendid Blended, the five length winner of a maiden at Del Mar on September 6. After tracking the leaders in the early stages she moved up on the outside to take the lead on the final turn and drew away from her opponents to win by four lengths from Splendid Blended. Nakatani, riding the filly for the first time, described her as "awesome" whilst Canani explained "From the first time she ran until now, I think she's lost about 100 pounds ... baby fat. She used to be chunky, but now she's growing, developing mentally, and she's very athletic."

On October 31, Sweet Catomine contested the twenty-first edition of the Breeders' Cup Juvenile Fillies' run that year at Lone Star Park in Texas. With Nakatani again in saddle, she started the 2/1 favourite in a twelve-runner field which also included Sense of Style (winner of the Spinaway Stakes and Matron Stakes), Balletto (Frizette Stakes), Culinary (Arlington-Washington Lassie Stakes) and Runway Model (Alcibiades Stakes). She raced in seventh place in the early stages as first Higher World and then Sis City set the pace. When making a forward move on the penultimate turn she was blocked and stumbled before recovering to turn into the straight in fourth place. She took the lead well inside the final furlong and accelerated clear of her opponents to win by three and three quarter lengths from Balletto with Runway Model in third ahead of Sis City. Commenting of the filly's problems in running, Nakatani said "I was in a little tight but she was able to overcome that" whilst Canani described her as "a very special filly".

=== 2005: three-year-old season ===
Sweet Catomine began her second season at Santa Anita Park on January 16 in the Grade III Santa Ysabel Stakes over one and one sixteenth of a mile. Ridden by Flores (Nakatani was serving a suspension), she started the 1/10 favorite despite conceding at least seven pounds to her four rivals and won by two and a half lengths from Pussycat Doll after taking the lead on the turn. Flores called the winner "a big horse with a lot of class" whilst Canani admitted that the filly was less than fully fit, commenting "This horse wasn't fit to run. I didn't put the screws down on her at all. But she's truly a champion. She's still developing". On March 13, Sweet Catomine, ridden by Nakatani, started the 1/5 favorite against six opponents in the Grade I Santa Anita Oaks over the same course and distance. After racing in sixth place for the first half mile, the filly moved up on the outside, took the lead on the final turn and accelerated clear in the stretch to win by three lengths from Memorette, with a gap of five lengths back to She Sings in third place. After the race Nakatani called the winner "the best filly I ever rode" whilst Canani was even more effusive, calling her "the best filly who ever lived".

On April 9, Sweet Catomine was matched against colts for the first time as she attempted to become the fourth filly, after Ciencia, Silver Spoon and Winning Colors to win the nine-furlong Santa Anita Derby. Canani had been describing the filly as a Kentucky Derby contender, but in the days before the race she reportedly bled after exercise and suffered from soreness in a foot as well as coming into season. Ridden by Nakatani, she started favorite and recovered from a bump on the backstretch to reach fifth place entering the straight. She could make no further progress, however, and finished fifth behind Buzzards Bay, General John B, Wilko and Giacomo. Wygod said after the race "In my heart I felt not to run but yesterday we made up our mind", whilst Nakatani commented "that's not her, she was just flat".

Sweet Catomine's performance in the Santa Anita Derby caused controversy, as some commentators believed that the betting public had not been made aware of the filly's training problems and that she had been sent for treatment at an Equine Medical Center in Los Olivos three days before the race. As the California Horse Racing Board launched an investigation, the Wygods removed the filly from the care of Canani who had been quoted as saying that she had been "doing great... running super" immediately before the race and transferred her to the stable of John Shirreffs. On April 12 the CHRB filed complaints against Martin Wygod and Dean Kerhoff, a transport worker who had driven the filly to Los Olivos after alleging that the details of her departure from the track and return from the medical facility had been "deliberately falsified". After a hearing before the racecourse stewards at Hollywood Park, the complaints were dismissed. Wygod's attorney Richard Kendall, blamed the media for the controversy saying "It was a junk misunderstanding. Journalists took at face value what they saw without asking the hard questions." Wygod himself commented My name has been dragged through the mud. It was terrible for both my wife and my kids, who I had hoped would continue to become more involved in the game".

In the meantime, Sweet Catomine had been retired from racing on April 21 after undergoing a veterinary assessment at Shirreffs' stable. With the hearing still pending, Wygod declined to discuss the details but said "I have decided to retire her and breed her to A.P. Indy. I wanted to retire her while she was sound. She will be shipped to Kentucky in the next two days and will be at Mill Ridge Farm."

== Race Record ==
Date	Track	Race	Distance (Furlongs)	Finish
7/21/2004	Del Mar	Maiden	5 1/2	2
8/28/2004	Del Mar	Del Mar Debutante	7	1
10/2/2004	Santa Anita Park	Oak Leaf Stakes	8 1/2	1
10/30/2004	Lone Star Park	Breeders' Cup Juvenile Fillies	8 1/2	1
1/16/2005	Santa Anita Park	Santa Ysabel Stakes	8 1/2	1
3/14/2005	Santa Anita Park	Santa Anita Oaks	8 1/2	1
4/9/2005	Santa Anita Park	Santa Anita Derby	9	5

== Assessment and awards ==
In the Eclipse Awards for 2004, Sweet Catomine was named American Champion Two-Year-Old Filly.

== Breeding record ==
Since her retirement from racing, Sweet Catomine has produced at least three foals:

- Sweet Thoughts, a bay filly, foaled in 2006, sired by A.P. Indy, failed to win in five starts in the United States
- Distribution, bay colt, 2010, by Unbridled's Song, unplaced on his only start
- Sweet Bernardini, dark bay or brown filly, 2012, by Bernardini, unraced

== Pedigree ==
Pedigree of Sweet Catomine (USA), bay mare, 2002
Sire Storm Cat (USA) 1983	Storm Bird (CAN); 1978	Northern Dancer	Nearctic
Sire Storm Cat (USA) 1983	Storm Bird (CAN); 1978	Northern Dancer	Natalma
Sire Storm Cat (USA) 1983	Storm Bird (CAN); 1978	South Ocean	New Providence
Sire Storm Cat (USA) 1983	Storm Bird (CAN); 1978	South Ocean	Shining Sun
Sire Storm Cat (USA) 1983	Terlingua (USA); 1976	Secretariat	Bold Ruler
Sire Storm Cat (USA) 1983	Terlingua (USA); 1976	Secretariat	Somethingroyal
Sire Storm Cat (USA) 1983	Terlingua (USA); 1976	Crimson Saint	Crimson Satan
Sire Storm Cat (USA) 1983	Terlingua (USA); 1976	Crimson Saint	Bolero Rose
Dam Sweet Life (USA) 1996	Kris S (USA); 1977	Roberto	Hail To Reason
Dam Sweet Life (USA) 1996	Kris S (USA); 1977	Roberto	Bramalea
Dam Sweet Life (USA) 1996	Kris S (USA); 1977	Sharp Queen	Princequillo
Dam Sweet Life (USA) 1996	Kris S (USA); 1977	Sharp Queen	Bridgework
Dam Sweet Life (USA) 1996	Symbolically (USA); 1983	Flying Paster	Gummo
Dam Sweet Life (USA) 1996	Symbolically (USA); 1983	Flying Paster	Procne
Dam Sweet Life (USA) 1996	Symbolically (USA); 1983	Hail To The Queen	Native Royalty
Dam Sweet Life (USA) 1996	Symbolically (USA); 1983	Hail To The Queen	Instinctively (Family: 21)
