= Got Koko =

American Thoroughbred racehorse

- Sire: Signal Tap
- Grandsire: Fappiano
- Dam: Baby North
- Damsire: Northern Baby
- Sex: Filly
- Foaled: 1999
- Country: United States
- Colour: Bay
- Breeder: Eileen H. Hartis
- Owner: Aase Headley & Paul Leung
- Trainer: Bruce Headley
- Record: 15: 7-1-4
- Earnings: US$$960,946

Major wins
- La Brea Stakes (2002); Torrey Pines Stakes (2002); El Encino Stakes (2003); La Cañada Stakes (2003); Lady's Secret Breeders' Cup Handicap (2003)

Awards
- Texas Horse of the Year (2003; Texas Champion Older Filly/Mare (2003)

Honours
- Got Koko Division of the Texas Stallion Stakes at Lone Star Park

Got Koko (foaled January 25, 1999 in Texas, died 2009) was an American Thoroughbred racehorse, one of only three horses bred in the State of Texas to ever win a Grade 1 stakes. She was bred by Eileen H. Hartis who sold her for $30,000 at the 2000 Keeneland September yearling sale to trainer Bruce Headley who sold a twenty-five percent interest in the filly to Paul Leung for $25,000.

Conditioned for racing by Bruce Headley, Got Koko raced under the name of his wife Aase and Paul Leung. In 2003, Got Koko became just the third-ever winner of the La Cañada Series for fillies at Santa Anita Park since its inception in 1975. The three-race series consists of the La Brea, El Encino and La Cañada Stakes for newly turning/turned 4-year old fillies run at an increasing distance. In addition, in winning the 2003 Lady's Secret Breeders' Cup Handicap, Got Koko defeated American Horse of the Year Azeri who came into the race having won eleven straight races. Got Koko went on to finish third to winner Adoration in the Breeders' Cup Distaff.

Got Koko returned to racing in January 2004, finishing third in the Grade I Santa Monica Handicap. An ankle injury kept her out of racing until September 2004 when the decision was made to retire her. Two months later she was sold to Jess Jackson through Emmanuel de Seroux's Narvic International agency for US$1.5 million at the November Keeneland Sales.

Bred to A.P. Indy, Got Koko produced her first foal in 2006 named Koko Pop. She died while giving birth to a foal by Bernardini.
