= Lakeway =

Lakeway may refer to:

- Lakeway (horse), an American Thoroughbred racehorse
- Lakeway, Texas, a city in Travis County, Texas, United States
- Mildred C. Lakeway School, an elementary school located in Littleton, New Hampshire, United States
