= Affluent (horse) =

American-bred Thoroughbred racehorse

- Sire: Affirmed
- Grandsire: Exclusive Native
- Dam: Trinity Place
- Damsire: Strawberry Road
- Sex: Filly
- Foaled: 1998
- Country: United States
- Colour: Bay
- Breeder: Janis R. Whitham
- Owner: Janis R. Whitham
- Trainer: Ron McAnally
- Record: 23: 8-5-4
- Earnings: US$1,497,650

Major wins
- Hollywood Oaks (2001); Queen Elizabeth II Challenge Cup Stakes (2001); La Brea Stakes (2001); El Encino Stakes (2002); Ramona Handicap (2002); Santa Monica Handicap (2002)

Affluent (foaled 1998 in Kentucky) is an American Thoroughbred racehorse.

== Background ==
Affluent is a bay mare bred in Kentucky by her owner Janis Whitham. She was trained by U.S. Racing Hall of Fame inductee Ron McAnally.

== Racing career ==
The daughter of 1978 U.S. Triple Crown winner Affirmed won four Grade I races and retired to broodmare duty with career earnings of $1,497,650.

== Breeding record ==
As a broodmare, Affluent has produced two foals by Storm Cat, one by Distorted Humor and a foal by Awesome Again is due in 2009.
