= Summertime Oaks =

- Class: Grade III
- Location: Santa Anita Park; Arcadia, California, United States
- Inaugurated: 1946 (as Hollywood Oaks at Hollywood Park Racetrack)
- Race type: Thoroughbred - Flat racing
- Website: www.santaanita.com

Race information
- Distance: 1 1/16 miles (8.5 furlongs)
- Surface: Dirt
- Track: left-handed
- Qualification: Three-year-old fillies
- Weight: Assigned
- Purse: $200,000

The Summertime Oaks is an American Thoroughbred horse race run annually in June at Santa Anita Park in Arcadia, California. The Grade III event is open to three-year-old fillies willing to race on dirt at a distance of one and one-sixteenth miles. The race was inaugurated in 1946 as the Hollywood Oaks and was originally run at Hollywood Park Racetrack.

Following the closure of Hollywood Park in 2013, the race was transferred to Santa Anita Park. At the same time, the purse was increased from $150,000 to $200,000.

Since inception, the race has been contested at various distances:

- 1 mile : 1946, 1948–1950
- 7 furlongs : 1947
- 1 1/16 miles : 1951–1953, 2002–present
- 1 1/8 miles : 1954-2001

== Records ==
Speed record:

- 1:41.55 - House of Fortune (2004) (at current distance of 1 1/16 miles)
- 1:46.93 - Lakeway (1994) (at previous distance of 1 1/8 miles)

Most wins by a jocky

- 5 - Ed Delahoussaye (1989, 1991, 1993, 1999, 2001)

Most wins by a trainer

- 6 - Bob Baffert (2003, 200, 2014, 2017, 2025, 2026)

== Winners ==
Year	Winner	Jockey	Trainer	Owner	Time
2026	Mizumi	Juan J. Hernandez	Bob Baffert	Baoma Corp	1:43.41
2025	Cash Call	Juan J. Hernandez	Bob Baffert	CSLR Racing Partners LLC	1:43.62
2024	Sugar Fish	Tyler Baze	Jeff Mullins	Sweetwater Stable & Talla Racing	1:43.41
2023	Window Shopping	Hector Isaac Berrios	Richard E. Mandella	Perry R Bass II & Ramona S Bass	1:45.01
2022	Under The Stars	Juan J. Hernandez	Sean McCarthy	Tabor, Magnier & Smith	1:43.51
2021	Crazy Beautiful	Mike E. Smith	Kenneth McPeek	Phoenix Thoroughbred III	1:43.85
2020	race not held				
2019	My Majestic Rose	Flavien Prat	Rodolphe Brisset	Judy B Hicks	1:45.08
2018	Ollie's Candy	Kent Desormeaux	William E. Morey	Paul & Karen Eggert	1:44.17
2017	Faypien	Rafael Bejarano	Bob Baffert	Baoma Corporation	1:43.17
2016	Songbird	Mike Smith	Jerry Hollendorfer	Fox Hill Farms	1:42.63
2015	Stellar Wind	Victor Espinoza	John W. Sadler	Hronis Racing	1:42.53
2014	Jo Jo Warrior	Rafael Bejarano	Bob Baffert	Zayat Stables	1:43.09
2013	Doinghardtimeagain	Rafael Bejarano	Jerry Hollendorfer	Tommy Town Thoroughbreds	1:43.27
2012	Potesta	Joe Talamo	Mike Mitchell	Fanticola and Scardino	1:43.22
2011	Zazu	Joel Rosario	John W. Sadler	Ann & Jerry Moss	1:43.36
2010	Switch	Martin Garcia	John W. Sadler	C R K Stable	1:44.54
2009	Carlsbad	Tyler Baze	Jeff Mullins	Dennis Weir	1:42.59
2008	Lethal Heat	Rafael Bejarano	Barry Abrams	B. Abrams/M. Auerbach/R. McCauley	1:43.00
2007	Tough Tiz's Sis	Aaron Gryder	Bob Baffert	Watson & Weitman Performances	1:43.30
2006	Hystericalady	Pat Valenzuela	Jerry Hollendorfer	Dr. George Tadaro et al.	1:43.08
2005	Brooke's Halo	Jon Court	Richard Mandella	Diamond A Racing Corp.	1:42.80
2004	House of Fortune	Alex Solis	Ron McAnally	Arnold Zetcher	1:41.55
2003	Santa Catarina	Gary Stevens	Bob Baffert	Bob & Beverly Lewis	1:41.62
2002	Adoration	Garrett Gomez	David Hofmans	Amerman Racing Stables	1:43.73
2001	Affluent	Ed Delahoussaye	Ron McAnally	Janis R. Whitham	1:49.20
2000	Kumari Continent	Kent Desormeaux	J. Paco Gonzalez	Trudy McCaffery/John Toffan	1:49.13
1999	Smooth Player	Ed Delahoussaye	Dan Hendricks	Pam & Martin Wygod/John Spohler	1:48.17
1998	Manistique	Gary Stevens	John Shirreffs	505 Farms	1:48.46
1997	Sharp Cat	Alex Solis	D. Wayne Lukas	The Thoroughbred Corp.	1:49.60
1996	Listening	Chris McCarron	Ron McAnally	Janis R. Whitham	1:48.70
1995	Sleep Easy	Corey Nakatani	Robert J. Frankel	Juddmonte Farms	1:50.24
1994	Lakeway	Kent Desormeaux	Gary F. Jones	Michael G. Rutherford	1:46.93
1993	Hollywood Wildcat	Ed Delahoussaye	Neil D. Drysdale	Irving & Marjorie Cowan	1:48.48
1992	Pacific Squall	Kent Desormeaux	J. Paco Gonzalez	Trudy McCaffery / John Toffan	1:48.07
1991	Fowda	Ed Delahoussaye	Richard J. Lundy	Allen E. Paulson	1:49.70
1990	Patches	Gary Stevens	D. Wayne Lukas	William T. Young	1:49.80
1989	Gorgeous	Ed Delahoussaye	Neil D. Drysdale	Robert N. Clay	1:47.80
1988	Pattern Step	Chris McCarron	Charlie Whittingham	Evergreen Farm	1:48.60
1987	Perchance To Dream	Ray Sibille	Victor E. Oppegard	Victor E. Oppegard	1:48.60
1986	Hidden Light	Bill Shoemaker	Charlie Whittingham	Howard B. Keck	1:47.80
1985	Fran's Valentine	Chris McCarron	Joe Manzi	Green Thumb Farm Stable	1:47.40

== Earlier winners ==
- 1984 - Moment To Buy
- 1983 - Heartlight No. One
- 1982 - Tango Dancer
- 1981 - Past Forgetting
- 1980 - Princess Karenda
- 1979 - Prize Spot
- 1978 - B Thoughtful
- 1977 - Glenaris
- 1976 - Answer
- 1975 - Nicosia
- 1974 - Miss Musket
- 1973 - Sandy Blue
- 1972 - Pallisima
- 1971 - Turkish Trousers
- 1970 - Last Of The Line
- 1969 - Tipping Time
- 1968 - Hooplah
- 1967 - Amerigo Lady
- 1966 - Spearfish
- 1965 - Straight Deal II
- 1964 - Loukahl
- 1963 - Delhi Maid
- 1962 - Dingle Bay
- 1961 - Rose O'Neill
- 1960 - Paris Pike
- 1959 - Sybil Brand
- 1958 - Midnight Date
- 1957 - Market Basket
- 1956 - Candy Dish
- 1955 - Baby Alice
- 1954 - Miz Clementine
- 1953 - Fleet Khal
- 1952 - A Gleam
- 1951 - Ruth Lily
- 1950 - Mrs. Fuddy
- 1949 - June Bride
- 1948 - Flying Rhythm
- 1947 - U Time
- 1946 - Honeymoon
