= Landaluce Stakes =

- Class: Listed Stakes
- Location: Santa Anita Park; Arcadia, California, USA (relocated from the now closed Hollywood Park Racetrack; Inglewood, California)
- Inaugurated: 1945
- Race type: Thoroughbred - Flat racing
- Website: www.santaanita.com

Race information
- Distance: 5 ½ furlongs
- Surface: Dirt
- Track: left-handed
- Qualification: Two-year-old fillies
- Weight: 122 lbs. Non-winners of a race other than claiming allowed 2 lbs. Maidens allowed 4 lbs. (2017)
- Purse: $100,000 (2017)

The Landaluce Stakes is a discontinued American Thoroughbred horse race which was held annually during the first part of July at Santa Anita Park in Arcadia, California. Created at Hollywood Park Racetrack in Inglewood, California in 1945 but after that track closed in 2013 the event was transferred to Santa Anita. Open to two-year-old filles, it was last contested over a distance of 5 ½ furlongs on dirt.

Inaugurated as the Hollywood Lassie Stakes, it was renamed in 1983 to honor Landaluce, the 1982 race winner and that year's American Champion Two-Year-Old Filly who died from a virus on December 11, 1982. Landaluce set the time record as well as the record for the biggest winning margin, opening up by 21 lengths over the rest of the field going down the stretch.

In 2004, the Landaluce Stakes lost its Grade III status.

The final running of the Landaluce Stakes took place on July 2, 2017. Surrender Now won the race by eight lengths for owner Gary Hartunian's Rockingham Ranch.

== Records ==
Speed record:

- 1:08.00 @ 6 furlongs - Landaluce (1982)
- 1:03.40 @ 5 ½ furlongs - Lynne's Orphan (1968)

Most wins by a jockey:

- 5 - Johnny Longden (1945, 1947, 1948, 1956, 1957)
- 5 - Bill Shoemaker (1959, 1962, 1967, 1972, 1985)
- 5 - Eddie Delahoussaye (1983, 1984, 1989, 1993, 1996)

Most wins by a trainer:

- 6 - D. Wayne Lukas (1978, 1982, 1984, 1985, 1987, 1994, 1999)

Most wins by an owner:

- 4 - Jan, Mace & Samantha Siegel (1988, 1990, 1991, 1992)
- 4 - Rex Ellsworth (1946, 1952, 1953, 1962)

== Winners ==
Year	Winner	Age	Jockey	Trainer	Owner	Dist. (furlongs)	Time	Win$	Gr.
2017	Surrender Now	2	Norberto Arroyo Jr.	Peter L. Miller	Rockingham Ranch (Gary Hartunian)	5.5 f	1:03.84	$60,000	LR
2016	Theonewewaitedfor	2	Rafael Bejarano	Michael C. Harrington	Heinz J. Steinmann	5.5 f	1:03.82	$75,000	LR
2015	Right There	2	Kent Desormeaux	J. Keith Desormeaux	Big Chief Racing LLC (Mathew Bryan)	5.5 f	1:05.39	$75,000	LR
2014	Enchanting Lady	2	Martin Garcia	Bob Baffert	Kaleem Shah	5.5 f	1:03.94	$75,000	LR
2013	She's a Tiger	2	Frank Alvarado	Jeffrey L. Bonde	Mark Dedomenico, Allen Aldrich, Lisa Hernandez, Stuart Downey, Phil Lebherz	6 f	1:12.04	$90,000	LR
2012	Executiveprivilege	2	Rafael Bejarano	Bob Baffert	Karl Watson, Mike Pegram, Paul Weitman	6 f	1:11.49	$90,000	LR
2011	Killer Graces	2	Joe Talamo	Jerry Hollendorfer	Daniel Borislow, Gillian Campbell, Steve Melen, Jerry Hollendorfer	6 f	1:11.23	$60,000	LR
2010	Dawnie Macho	2	Joe Talamo	John W. Sadler	Gary & Cecil Barber	6 f	1:10.75	$60,000	LR
2009	Repo	2	Corey Nakatani	Douglas F. O'Neill	J. Paul Reddam	6 f	1:10.07	$60,000	LR
2008	Emmy Darling	2	David Flores	John W. Sadler	Ike & Dawn Thrash	6 f	1:09.20	$61,740	LR
2007	Golden Noodle	2	Clinton Potts	Jack Van Berg	Bill Feeley	6 f	1:11.49	$66,600	LR
2006	Pinata	2	Martin Pedroza	Peter L. Miller	Graph Racing Stable	6 f	1:10.89	$60,000	LR
2005	Indian Breeze	2	Tyler Baze	Adam Kitchingham	William Peeples	6 f	1:10.91	$62,880	LR
2004	Souvenir Gift	2	Mike E. Smith	Sam Semkin	Greg Unruh & Sam Semkin	6 f	1:09.75	$64,080	G3
2003	Wacky Patty	2	Jose Valdivia, Jr.	James K. Chapman	James K. Chapman	6 f	1:10.28	$60,180	G3
2002	Buffythecenterfold	2	Matt Garcia	Melvin F. Stute	Allen A. Brian	6 f	1:10.51	$66,360	G3
2001	Georgia's Storm	2	Chris McCarron	Eduardo Inda	Reinaldo A. Martinez	6 f	1:10.40	$65,040	G3
2000	Notable Career	2	Corey Nakatani	Bob Baffert	Golden Eagle Farm	6 f	1:11.10	$65,040	G3
1999	Magicalmysterycat	2	Chris Antley	D. Wayne Lukas	Padua Stables	6 f	1:11.01	$63,120	G2
1998	Hookedonthefeelin	2	Gary Stevens	Bob Baffert	Michael E. Pegram	6 f	1:09.60	$62,760	G2
1997	Career Collection	2	Corey Nakatani	Wally Dollase	Golden Eagle Farm	6 f	1:10.41	$62,820	G2
1996	Starry Ice	2	Eddie Delahoussaye	Jerry Dutton	Harold Greene & Jerry Dutton	6 f	1:11.13	$62,160	G2
1995	Raw Gold	2	Alex Solis	David Hofmans	Ridder Stable	6 f	1:10.64	$59,600	G2
1994	Serena's Song	2	Gary Stevens	D. Wayne Lukas	Robert & Beverly Lewis	6 f	1:10.11	$66,800	G2
1993	Rhapsodic	2	Eddie Delahoussaye	Brian A. Mayberry	Jerry Moss	6 f	1:10.59	$59,800	G2
1992	Zealous Connection	2	Martin Pedroza	Brian A. Mayberry	Jan, Mace & Samantha Siegel	6 f	1:09.86	$58,500	G2
1991	Fluttery Danseur	2	Martin Pedroza	Brian A. Mayberry	Jan, Mace & Samantha Siegel	6 f	1:09.40	$56,200	G2
1990	Garden Gal	2	Martin Pedroza	Brian A. Mayberry	Jan, Mace & Samantha Siegel	6 F	1:10.40	$60,900	3
1989	Dominant Dancer	2	Eddie Delahoussaye	Don Harper	Jamie Schloss & Yale Farar	6 F	1:10.40	$60,100	3
1988	Distinctive Sis	2	Alex Solis	Brian A. Mayberry	Jan, Mace & Samantha Siegel	6 F	1:10.80	$62,250	3
1987	Over All	2	Gary Stevens	D. Wayne Lukas	Eugene V. Klein	6 f	1:10.60	$63,400	3
1986	Delicate Vine	2	Gary Stevens	Robert J. Frankel	Greg Alsdorf, R.J. Frankel, Jerry Moss	6 f	1:10.00	$58,850	3
1985	Arewehavingfunyet	2	Bill Shoemaker	D. Wayne Lukas	Spendthrift Farm	6 f	1:10.00	$59,700	3
1984	Window Seat	2	Eddie Delahoussaye	A. Thomas Doyle	Circle C Ranch & Witt	6 f	1:10.00	$64,550	3
1983	Simple Magic	2	Eddie Delahoussaye	Richard W. Mulhall	Universal Stable (Prince Ahmed bin Salman)	6 f	1:10.60	$46,300	2
1982	Landaluce	2	Laffit Pincay Jr.	D. Wayne Lukas	Lloyd R. French & Barry Beal	6 f	1:08.00	$43,750	2
1981	Ticketed	2	Darrel McHargue	David La Croix	Joseph W. La Croix	6 f	1:11.40	$46,200	2
1980	Native Fancy	2	Laffit Pincay Jr.	Louis R. Carno	Thomas M. & Marguerite F. Cavanagh	6 f	1:10.00	$54,425	2
1979	Table Hands	2	Enrique Munoz	Jake Battles	Wilbur & Marianne Stadelman	6 f	1:10.40	$54,475	2
1978	Terlingua	2	Darrel McHargue	D. Wayne Lukas	Lloyd R. French & Barry Beal	6 f	1:08.80	$48,725	2
1977	B. Thoughtful	2	Donald Pierce	Robert L. Wheeler	William R. & Carole S. Bohm, Robert L. Wheeler	6 f	1:10.20	$53,475	2
1976	Wavy Waves	2	Laffit Pincay Jr.	L. Ross Fenstermaker	Fred W. Hooper	6 f	1:10.20	$55,225	2
1975	Walk in the Sun	2	Frank Olivares	William A. Reavis	Nobe Matsumoto & Morris Soriano	6 f	1:10.40	$56,025	2
1974	Hot N Nasty	2	Darrel McHargue	Gordon R. Potter	Dan Lasater	6 f	1:09.00	$55,225	2
1973	Special Goddess	2	Laffit Pincay Jr.	John W. Russell	Fred W. Hooper	6 f	1:09.60	$53,125	2
1972-1	Windy's Daughter	2	Bill Shoemaker	A. Thomas Doyle	Bernice Blackman	6 f	1:09.60	$35,725	
1972-2	Bold Liz	2	Jorge Tejeira	Rod Kaufman	Peter S. & Linda J. Weakly	6 f	1:09.40	$35,225	
1971	Cautious Bidder	2	John L. Rotz	Robert E. Wingfield	Green Thumb Farm Stable (Earl Scheib)	6 f	1:09.20	$54,825	
1970	June Darling	2	William Mahorney	Fred A. Miquelez	Ellwood B. & Elizabeth E. Johnston	6 f	1:10.20	$38,125	
1969	Consider Me Lucky	2	Laffit Pincay Jr.	Fred A. Miquelez	Ellwood B. & Elizabeth E. Johnston	6 f	1:09.80	$41,500	
1968	Lynne's Orphan	2	Johnny Sellers	Linwood J. Brooks	Lester Eaton & Winston W. Kratz	5.5 f	1:03.40	$46,075	
1967	Morgaise	2	Bill Shoemaker	James W. Maloney	William Haggin Perry	5.5 f	1:03.80	$51,050	
1966	Mira Femme	2	Ismael Valenzuela	Irvin A. Guiney	Verne H. Winchell Jr.	5.5 f	1:03.60	$50,650	
1965	Premise	2	Miguel Yanez	Hurst Philpot	Helen L. Kenaston	5.5 f	1:04.00	$56,800	
1964	Getaway Maid	2	Senon Trevino	Ralph Mojica	Eleanor Garrity	5.5 f	1:04.80	$59,275	
1963	Sari's Song	2	Jack Leonard	Jess Byrd	J. Kell Houssels	5.5 f	1:04.00	$17,500	
1962	Honey Bunny	2	Bill Shoemaker	Mesh Tenney	Rex Ellsworth	5.5 f	1:04.00	$17,650	
1961	Sunday Slippers	2	Peter Moreno	William W. Morris	M/M Horace B. Taylor	5.5 f	1:03.60	$15,800	
1960	Het's Pet	2	George Taniguchi	Fred M. Smith	M/M John Eyraud	5.5 f	1:04.00	$16,450	
1959	Echoic	2	Bill Shoemaker	Farrell W. Jones	John J. Elmore	5.5 f	1:04.00	$17,200	
1958	Khalita	2	Raymond York	Malcolm Anderson	William N. Modglin	5.5 f	1:05.80	$16,800	
1957	Sally Lee	2	Johnny Longden	Charles Dickens	Covert Ranch (George Covert)	5.5 f	1:04.80	$16,300	
1956	Darling Adelle	2	Johnny Longden	William Molter	George Lewis Stable	5.5 f	1:04.20	$16,500	
1955	Miss Todd	2	Raymond York	Robert L. Wheeler	J. Rudkin Jelks	5.5 f	1:04.60	$18,000	
1954	Fair Molly	2	Rogelio Trejos	Benny B. Slasky	Dr. & Mrs. John R. Smith	5.5 f	1:04.60	$18,450	
1953	Chorus Khal	2	Louis Leon	Mesh Tenney	Rex Ellsworth	5.5 f	1:05.20	$17,400	
1952	Fleet Khal	2	Reginald Heather	Lynn A. Boice	Rex Ellsworth	5.5 f	1:04.60	$15,500	
1951	Thataway	2	David Erb	Harry L. Daniels	William Goetz	5.5 f	1:06.00	$20,850	
1950	Sickle's Image	2	William Fisk	Clarence W. Hartwick	Clarence W. Hartwick	6 f	1:10.00	$21,750	
1949	Fleet Rings	2	Jack Westrope	William T. Westrope	Connie M. Ring	5.5 f	1:06.40	$28,850	
1948	Brenton Light	2	Johnny Longden	William Molter	Muriel Vanderbilt Adams	5.5 f	1:06.00	$19,800	
1947	Nursery School	2	Johnny Longden	Allen B. Drumheller	Fannie Hertz	5.5 f	1:05.20	$20,200	
1946	U Time	2	Lester Balaski	Mesh Tenney	Rex Ellsworth	6 f	1:10.20	$19,650	
1945	Widow's Peak	2	Johnny Longden	George M. Odom	Louis B. Mayer	6 f	1:12.00	$14,035	
