= B. Thoughtful =

American-bred Thoroughbred racehorse

- Sire: Don B.
- Grandsire: Fleet Nasrullah
- Dam: Fluffy Thought
- Damsire: Fair Truckle
- Sex: Filly
- Foaled: 1975
- Country: United States
- Colour: Chestnut
- Breeder: William R. & Carole S. Bohm
- Owner: Walter Haefner
- Trainer: Robert L. Wheeler
- Record: 19: 9-3-3
- Earnings: US$424,755

Major wins
- Oak Leaf Stakes (1977); Hollywood Lassie Stakes (1977); Hollywood Nursery Stakes (1977); Anoakia Stakes (1977); Hollywood Oaks (1978); Princess Stakes (1978); La Cañada Stakes (1979); El Encino Stakes (1979)

Honours
- B. Thoughtful Stakes at Hollywood Park

B. Thoughtful (foaled 1975 in California) was an American Thoroughbred racemare. Raced by Swiss businessman Walter Haefner and trained by future U.S. Racing Hall of Fame inductee, Robert Wheeler, she won eight stakes races including the Oak Leaf Stakes and Hollywood Oaks.

The B. Thoughtful Stakes, a race for California bred fillies and mares run annually at Hollywood Park Racetrack was named in her honor.

== Pedigree ==
Pedigree of B. Thoughtful
Sire Don B. 1965	Fleet Nasrullah 1955	Nasrullah	Nearco
Sire Don B. 1965	Fleet Nasrullah 1955	Nasrullah	Mumtaz Begum
Sire Don B. 1965	Fleet Nasrullah 1955	Happy Go Feet	Count Fleet
Sire Don B. 1965	Fleet Nasrullah 1955	Happy Go Feet	Draeh
Sire Don B. 1965	Early Frames 1959	Prince John	Princequillo
Sire Don B. 1965	Early Frames 1959	Prince John	Not Afraid
Sire Don B. 1965	Early Frames 1959	Bed O'Roses	Preciptic
Sire Don B. 1965	Early Frames 1959	Bed O'Roses	Pasquinade
Dam Fluffy Thought 1964	Fair Truckle 1943	Fair Trial	Fairway
Dam Fluffy Thought 1964	Fair Truckle 1943	Fair Trial	Lady Juror
Dam Fluffy Thought 1964	Fair Truckle 1943	Truckle	Truculent
Dam Fluffy Thought 1964	Fair Truckle 1943	Truckle	Shepherdess
Dam Fluffy Thought 1964	Maid O'Fire 1948	Firozepore	Rustom Pasha
Dam Fluffy Thought 1964	Maid O'Fire 1948	Firozepore	Farmood
Dam Fluffy Thought 1964	Maid O'Fire 1948	Cheeky Sue	Black Toney
Dam Fluffy Thought 1964	Maid O'Fire 1948	Cheeky Sue	Chicsu
