= Santa Anita Oaks =

- Class: Grade II
- Location: Santa Anita Park; Arcadia, California, USA
- Inaugurated: 1935
- Race type: Thoroughbred - Flat racing
- Website: www.santaanita.com

Race information
- Distance: 8.5 furlongs (1 1/16 miles)
- Surface: Dirt
- Track: Left-handed
- Qualification: Three-year-old fillies
- Weight: 122 lbs.
- Purse: $200,000 (2020)

Santa Anita Oaks is an American Grade II Thoroughbred horse race held annually in early April at Santa Anita Park in Arcadia, California. Open to three-year-old fillies willing to race 8.5 furlongs (1 1/16 miles) on the dirt. The race is a Grade II event with a current purse of $200,000 and has been a prep race to the Triple Tiara of Thoroughbred Racing, including the Kentucky Oaks, the Black-Eyed Susan Stakes and Mother Goose Stakes.

Inaugurated in 1935 as a race for two-year-olds, it originated as the Santa Susana Stakes. In 1952 the race became the Santa Susana Handicap then in 1958 reverted to the Santa Susana Stakes. In 1986 it was given its current designation as the Santa Anita Oaks. In 2020 the event was downgraded to Grade II.

Since inception, the race has been set at various distances:

- 1935 : 3 furlongs
- 1937 - 1938 : 6 furlongs
- 1939 - 1951 & 1956 : 7 furlongs
- 1954 & 1957 : 8 furlongs
- 1957 – present : 8.5 furlongs

== Records ==
Stakes Record

- Turbulent Descent (1:41.05) - Current Distance of 8.5 furlongs

Most wins by a jockey:

- Bill Shoemaker - 10
- Donald Pierce - 5
- Gary Stevens won four in a row, 1987–1990

Most wins by a trainer:

- D. Wayne Lukas - 8
- Charles E. Whittingham - 4

== Winners of the Santa Anita Oaks since 1975 ==
Year	Winner	Age	Jockey	Trainer	Owner	Distance	Time	Grade
2026	Meaning	3	Juan J. Hernandez	Michael W. McCarthy	Bridlewood Farm and Eclipse Thoroughbred Partners	1 1/16 miles	1:43.99	II
2025	Tenma	3	Juan J. Hernandez	Bob Baffert	Baoma Corp	1 1/16 miles	1:46.15	II
2024	Nothing Like You	3	Lanfranco Dettori	Bob Baffert	Georgia Antley Hunt, Jeff Giglio and John L. Rogitz	1 1/16 miles	1:43.21	II
2023	Faiza	3	Flavien Prat	Bob Baffert	Michael Lund Petersen	1 1/16 miles	1:43.27	II
2022	Desert Dawn	3	Umberto Rispoli	Philip D'Amato	H & E Ranch	1 1/16 miles	1:43.50	II
2021	Soothsay	3	Flavien Prat	Richard Mandella	Claiborne Farm	1 1/16 miles	1:44.35	II
2020	Swiss Skydiver	3	Mike Smith	Kenneth McPeek	Peter J. Callahan	1 1/16 miles	1:43.20	II
2019	Bellafina	3	Flavien Prat	Simon Callaghan	Kaleem Shah	1 1/16 miles	1:45.47	I
2018	Midnight Bisou	3	Mike E. Smith	William Spawr	Allen Racing LLC and Bloom Racing Stable LLC	1 1/16 miles	1:44.79	I
2017	Paradise Woods	3	Flavien Prat	Richard Mandella	Sarkowsky, Steven, Wygod, Martin J. and Wygod, Pam	1 1/16 miles	1:42.53	I
2016	Songbird	3	Mike E. Smith	Jerry Hollendorfer	Fox Hill Farms	1 1/16 miles	1:44.14	I
2015	Stellar Wind	3	Victor Espinoza	John W. Sadler	Hronis Racing	1 1/16 miles	1:43.26	I
2014	Fashion Plate	3	Gary Stevens	Simon Callaghan	Zetcher/Tabor	1 1/16 miles	1:42.97	I
2013	Beholder	3	Garrett K. Gomez	Richard E. Mandella	Spendthrift Farm	1 1/16 miles	1:43.16	I
2012	Willa B Awesome	3	Martin Pedroza	Walther Solis	Phil Daniels	1 1/16 miles	1:42.47	I
2011	Turbulent Descent	3	David Flores	Mike Puype	Blinkers On Racing	1 1/16 miles	1:41.05	I
2010	Crisp	3	Joel Rosario	John W. Sadler	Michael Talla	1 1/16 miles	1:43.50	I
2009	Stardom Bound	3	Mike E. Smith	Robert J. Frankel	IEAH Stables	1 1/16 miles	1:43.62	I
2008	Ariege	3	Corey Nakatani	Robert J. Frankel	IEAH Stables/Pegasus Group	1 1/16 miles	1:42.73	I
2007	Rags to Riches	3	Garrett Gomez	Todd Pletcher	M.Tabor & D. Smith	1 1/16 miles	1:42.84	I
2006	Balance	3	Victor Espinoza	David Hofmans	Amerman Racing	1 1/16 miles	1:42.99	I
2005	Sweet Catomine	3	Corey Nakatani	Julio C. Canani	Pam & Martin Wygod	1 1/16 miles	1:44.44	I
2004	Silent Sighs	3	David R. Flores	Julio C. Canani	Pam & Martin Wygod	1 1/16 miles	1:42.84	I
2003	Composure	3	Jerry Bailey	Bob Baffert	Robert & Beverly Lewis	1 1/16 miles	1:43.34	I
2002	You	3	Jerry Bailey	Robert J. Frankel	Edmund A. Gann	1 1/16 miles	1:42.70	I
2001	Golden Ballet	3	Chris McCarron	Jenine Sahadi	Team Valor/Heiligbrodt Stable	1 1/16 miles	1:41.83	I
2000	Surfside	3	Pat Day	D. Wayne Lukas	Overbrook Farm	1 1/16 miles	1:44.03	I
1999	Excellent Meeting	3	David R. Flores	Bob Baffert	Golden Eagle Farm	1 1/16 miles	1:43.26	I
1998	Hedonist	3	Kent Desormeaux	Randy Bradshaw	Siegel family	1 1/16 miles	1:44.14	I
1997	Sharp Cat	3	Corey Nakatani	D. Wayne Lukas	The Thoroughbred Corp.	1 1/16 miles	1:42.22	I
1996	Antespend	3	Chris Antley	Ronald McAnally	Jack Kent Cooke	1 1/16 miles	1:43.04	I
1995	Serena's Song	3	Corey Nakatani	D. Wayne Lukas	Robert & Beverly Lewis	1 1/16 miles	1:42.71	I
1994	Lakeway	3	Kent Desormeaux	Gary F. Jones	Michael G. Rutherford	1 1/16 miles	1:41.66	I
1993	Eliza	3	Pat Valenzuela	Alex Hassinger, Jr.	Allen E. Paulson	1 1/16 miles	1:42.97	I
1992	Golden Treat	3	Kent Desormeaux	Richard Mandella	Golden Eagle Farm	1 1/16 miles	1:43.37	I
1991	Lite Light	3	Corey Nakatani	Henry Moreno	Oaktown Stable	1 1/16 miles	1:42.40	I
1990	Hail Atlantis	3	Gary Stevens	D. Wayne Lukas	Tayhill Stables	1 1/16 miles	1:43.00	I
1989	Imaginary Lady	3	Gary Stevens	D. Wayne Lukas	French, Jr. & Lukas	1 1/16 miles	1:43.40	I
1988	Winning Colors	3	Gary Stevens	D. Wayne Lukas	Eugene V. Klein	1 1/16 miles	1:42.00	I
1987	Timely Assertion	3	Gary Stevens	Henry Moreno	Wichita Equine, Inc.	1 1/16 miles	1:43.60	I
1986	Hidden Light	3	Bill Shoemaker	Charlie Whittingham	Elizabeth A. Keck	1 1/16 miles	1:42.40	I
1985	Fran's Valentine	3	Pat Valenzuela	Joseph Manzi	Green Thumb Farm Stable	1 1/16 miles	1:42.40	I
1984	Althea	3	Laffit Pincay, Jr.	D. Wayne Lukas	Aykroyd, Alexander & Groves	1 1/16 miles	1:43.60	I
1983	Fabulous Notion	3	Donald Pierce	James Jordan	Pine Meadow Thoroughbreds	1 1/16 miles	1:43.60	I
1982	Blush With Pride	3	Bill Shoemaker	D. Wayne Lukas	Stonereath Farms	1 1/16 miles	1:45.80	I
1981	Nell's Briquette	3	Bill Shoemaker	Jack Van Berg	Triple L. Stables	1 1/16 miles	1:42.80	I
1980	Bold 'n Determined	3	Eddie Delahoussaye	Neil Drysdale	Saron Stable	1 1/16 miles	1:41.20	I
1979	Caline	3	Bill Shoemaker	Laz Barrera	Oatlands Stable	1 1/16 miles	1:41.60	I
1978	Grenzen	3	Darrel McHargue	Lorren Rettele	Woolsey, Schaffer & Delaplaine	1 1/16 miles	1:43.80	II
1977	Sound of Summer	3	Fernando Toro	Tom Pratt	Busching & Bernstein	1 1/16 miles	1:42.20	II
1976	Girl in Love	3	Fernando Toro	Vincent Clyne	Elmendorf Farm	1 1/16 miles	1:43.20	II
1975	Sarsar	3	Bill Shoemaker	David A. Whiteley	William H. Perry	1 1/16 miles	1:42.80	II

== Earlier winners ==
- 1974 - Miss Musket
- 1973 - Belle Marie
- 1972 - Susan's Girl
- 1971 - Turkish Trousers
- 1970 - Opening Bid
- 1969 - Dumptys Lady
- 1968 - Allie's Serenade
- 1967 - Fish House
- 1966 - Spearfish
- 1965 - Desert Love
- 1964 - Blue Norther
- 1963 - Lamb Chop
- 1962 - Pixie Erin
- 1961 - Fun House
- 1960 - Darling June
- 1959 - Silver Spoon
- 1958 - Penumbra
- 1957 - Market Basket
- 1956 - Dupatta
- 1955 - No race
- 1954 - Quillo Maid
- 1953 - Femme Fatale
- 1952 - Season's Best
- 1951 - Ruth Lily †
- 1950 - Special Touch
- 1949 - Gaffery
- 1948 - Mrs. Rabbit
- 1947 - Hubble Bubble
- 1946 - Enfilade
- 1945 - Busher
- 1941 - Cute Trick
- 1940 - Augury
- 1939 - Sweet Nancy
- 1938 - Minulus
- 1937 - Patty Cake
- 1936 - No race
- 1935 - Dunlin Lady
† In 1951, Sweet Talk won the race but was disqualified and placed third.

== See also ==
- Road to the Kentucky Oaks
