= Jewel Princess =

American-bred Thoroughbred racehorse

- Sire: Key to the Mint
- Grandsire: Graustark
- Dam: Jewell Ridge
- Damsire: Melyno
- Sex: Filly
- Foaled: April 22, 1992; Florida, USA
- Died: 2012 (exact date unknown)
- Country: United States
- Colour: Bay
- Breeder: Farnsworth Farms (Michael Sherman)
- Owner: Michael Sherman (1992-1994); Richard and Martha J. Stephen (1994-2000); Coolmore Stud (2000-2012)
- Trainer: Wallace Dollase
- Record: 29: 13-4-7
- Earnings: US$1,904,060

Major wins
- San Clemente Handicap (1995); Linda Vista Breeders' Cup Handicap (1995); San Jose Breeders' Cup Handicap (1995); Vanity Invitational Handicap (1996); Louisville Breeders' Cup Handicap (1996); La Cañada Stakes (1996); El Encino Stakes (1996); Santa Margarita Invitational Handicap (1997); Santa Maria Handicap (1997); Breeders' Cup wins: Breeders' Cup Distaff (1996)

Awards
- American Champion Older Female Horse (1996)

Jewel Princess (April 22, 1992 – 2012) was an American Thoroughbred Champion racemare. She won multiple stakes races, most notably the 1996 Breeders' Cup Distaff.

== Background ==
Jewel Princess was foaled on April 22, 1992 by Farnsworth Farms. She was sired by Key to the Mint and foaled by Jewell Ridge.

== Career ==
=== 1994 ===
Jewel Princess made her debut start at Calder Race Course on October 27, finishing 3rd. She made two more starts at Calder at the end of the year, winning both races. Afterwards, she was sold to Richard and Martha Stephen for $29,000.

=== 1995 ===
After a 5th place finish in the Santa Anita Oaks, she would win the San Jose Breeders’ Cup Handicap at Bay Meadows on April 8. After 2 more 5th place finishes at Hollywood Park, she won the San Clemente Handicap at Del Mar on July 29. Her last win as a 3-year-old would be the Linda Vista Breeders’ Cup Handicap on November 4.

=== 1996 ===
Jewel Princess won her first two races as a 4-year-old in the El Encino Stakes on January 20, and La Cañada Stakes on February 11. After a 3rd place finish in the Santa Margarita Invitational, she won the Louisville Breeders’ Cup Handicap on May 3. Following 2 runner-up finishes in the Hawthorne Handicap and Milady Breeders’ Cup Handicap, she won the Vanity Handicap on July 21.

She then took a 2-month layoff and finished 2^{nd} in the Lady’s Secret Breeders’ Cup Handicap on October 6. 3 weeks later, she won the Breeders’ Cup Distaff at Woodbine. Prior to the race The Thoroughbred Corp owned by Ahmed bin Salman Al Saud bought into the horse. She was voted the Eclipse Award as the 1996 American Champion Older Female Horse.

=== 1997 ===
Jewel Princess would again win her first two races of her 5-year-old campaign, winning the Santa Maria and Santa Margarita Invitational Handicaps at Santa Anita. Those would be her final victories of her career as she finished 2^{nd} in the Apple Blossom Handicap, followed by three 3rd place finishes. On November 8, she compete in the Breeders’ Cup Distaff, however would trail for most of the race and finished last.

=== Record ===
Date	Race	Track	Finish
2-year old
10/27/1994	Maiden Claiming	Calder	3rd
11/13/1994	Maiden Claiming	Calder	1st
12/4/1994	Allowance	Calder	1st
3-year old
2/22/1995	Allowance	Santa Anita	1st
3/12/1995	Santa Anita Oaks	Santa Anita	5th
4/8/1995	San Jose Breeders' Cup Handicap	Bay Meadows	1st
4/30/1995	Senorita Breeders' Cup Stakes	Hollywood Park	5th
5/20/1995	Honeymoon Handicap	Hollywood Park	5th
7/29/1995	San Clemente Handicap	Del Mar	1st
8/20/1995	Del Mar Oaks	Del Mar	5th
10/14/1995	Harold C. Ramser Sr. Handicap	Santa Anita	3rd
11/4/1995	Linda Vista Breeders' Cup Handicap	Santa Anita	1st
12/30/1995	La Brea Stakes	Santa Anita	3rd
4-year old
1/20/1996	El Encino Stakes	Santa Anita	1st
2/11/1996	La Canada Stakes	Santa Anita	1st
3/10/1996	Santa Margarita Invitational Handicap	Santa Anita	3rd
5/3/1996	Louisville Breeders' Cup Handicap	Churchill Downs	1st
5/25/1996	Hawthorne Handicap	Hollywood Park	2nd
6/23/1996	Milady Breeders' Cup Handicap	Hollywood Park	2nd
7/21/1996	Vanity Invitational Handicap	Hollywood Park	1st
10/6/1996	Lady's Secret Breeders' Cup Handicap	Santa Anita	2nd
10/26/1996	Breeders' Cup Distaff	Woodbine	1st
5-year old
2/16/1997	Santa Maria Handicap	Santa Anita	1st
3/9/1997	Santa Margarita Invitational Handicap	Santa Anita	1st
4/11/1997	Apple Blossom Handicap	Oaklawn Park	2nd
6/28/1997	Hempstead Handicap	Belmont Park	3rd
7/20/1997	Vanity Handicap	Hollywood Park	3rd
10/19/1997	Beldame Stakes	Belmont Park	3rd
11/8/1997	Breeders' Cup Distaff	Hollywood Park	8th

== Stud Career ==
In November 2000, while pregnant with a foal to Storm Cat, Jewel Princess was sold at the Keeneland breeding stock sale for 4,900,000 USD to John Magnier of Coolmore Stud. Her last foal was sired by Henrythenavigator, a filly named Evropa who never raced. She died shortly thereafter in 2012.

== Pedigree ==
Pedigree of Jewel Princess (1992-2012)
Sire Key to the Mint	Graustark	Ribot	Tenerani
Sire Key to the Mint	Graustark	Ribot	Romanella
Sire Key to the Mint	Graustark	Flower Bowl	Alibhai
Sire Key to the Mint	Graustark	Flower Bowl	Flower Bed
Sire Key to the Mint	Key Bridge	Princequillo	Prince Rose
Sire Key to the Mint	Key Bridge	Princequillo	Cosquilla
Sire Key to the Mint	Key Bridge	Blue Banner	War Admiral
Sire Key to the Mint	Key Bridge	Blue Banner	Risque Blue
Dam Jewell Ridge	Melyno	Nonoalco	Nearctic
Dam Jewell Ridge	Melyno	Nonoalco	Seximee
Dam Jewell Ridge	Melyno	Comely	Boran
Dam Jewell Ridge	Melyno	Comely	Princess Commene
Dam Jewell Ridge	Say What You Mean	Judger	Damascus
Dam Jewell Ridge	Say What You Mean	Judger	Face The Facts
Dam Jewell Ridge	Say What You Mean	Call The Queen	Hail To Reason
Dam Jewell Ridge	Say What You Mean	Call The Queen	Queen Empress
