= Life Is Sweet (horse) =

American-bred Thoroughbred racehorse

- Sire: Storm Cat
- Grandsire: Storm Bird
- Dam: Sweet Life
- Damsire: Kris S.
- Sex: Mare
- Foaled: 2005
- Country: United States
- Colour: Bay
- Breeder: Pam & Martin Wygod
- Owner: Pam & Martin Wygod
- Trainer: John Shirreffs
- Record: 16: 6-4-1
- Earnings: $1,820,810

Major wins
- El Encino Stakes (2009); La Cañada Stakes (2009); Santa Margarita Handicap (2009) Breeders' Cup wins: Breeders' Cup Ladies' Classic (2009)

Honours
- Life Is Sweet Stakes at Hollywood Park

Life Is Sweet (foaled March 5, 2005, in Kentucky) is an American Thoroughbred racehorse who in early 2009 was thought to be a threat to her unbeaten stablemate, Zenyatta, after winning three straight stakes races.

== Background ==
Life Is Sweet was bred by her owners, Pam & Martin Wygod. By leading sire Storm Cat, she is out of the Kris S. mare Sweet Life, who is also the dam of champion juvenile filly Sweet Catomine. Sweet Life was named the 2009 Kentucky Broodmare of the Year.

Life Is Sweet originally raced on the east coast with Hall of Fame trainer Bill Mott, but at age four she was transferred to the California-based barn of John Shirreffs, best known as the trainer of Zenyatta.

== Racing career ==
Life Is Sweet made her debut as a two-year-old at Saratoga on August 30, 2007, finishing eighth. On October 7, she made her second start, this time at Belmont on the turf, and won by nine lengths. She was next entered in the Epitome Breeders' Cup Stakes on October 27 but finished sixth.

Life Is Sweet did not run again until an allowance race at Gulfstream Park on February 22, 2008, which she won. On April 5, she faced Grade 1 company for the first time in the Ashland Stakes, finishing fourth. She then ran second in both the Calder Oaks on April 26 and Sand Point Stakes on May 31.

Life Is Sweet returned to racing on January 18, 2009, in the El Encino Stakes at Santa Anita. Now trained by Shirreffs, she settled behind horses for the first 3/4 miles, then swung four wide around the turn to get running room. In the stretch, she pulled to the lead and won by 2 1/2 lengths. Her next start was the La Canada Stakes on February 15, for which she was made the 6-5 favorite. She again settled near the back of the field until swinging wide on the final turn, gaining the lead near the finish line to win by 3/4 lengths. Although the opening fractions were quite slow, Life Is Sweet ran the last eighth of a mile in a very quick 11.20 seconds. Jockey Garrett Gomez said, "She really showed a great turn of foot and to be able to overcome that slow pace like she did is amazing. You can see her stride gets longer as she gets closer to the wire."

On March 14, she faced her biggest test yet in the Grade 1 Santa Margarita Invitational, where she was the even-money favorite. The race was nearly a carbon copy of her two previous wins, with Life Is Sweet starting her winning move around the far turn to win by 2 1/2 lengths.

Her next start was the Milady Handicap on May 23, in which her stablemate Zenyatta was making her season debut. The two raced in fifth and sixth down the backstretch and started their moves around the far turn. Zenyatta outkicked Life Is Sweet to win by 1 3/4 lengths, with Life Is Sweet in second.

Life is Sweet then faced off with males in the Hollywood Gold Cup on July 11. In a large field of 13, she was trapped behind horses until they entered the stretch, where she closed from 11th to 3rd. She then finished fourth behind Zenyatta in both the Clement L. Hirsch on August 9 and the Lady's Secret on October 10. A slow pace in both races compromised her attempt to come from behind in the stretch.

On November 6, 2009, Life Is Sweet scored a runaway win in the Breeders' Cup Ladies Classic. She broke poorly and got pinched by other horses but soon settled near the back of the pack. On the far turn, she circled wide and drew off to win. "I’m just so happy for Life is Sweet," said Shirreffs. “She’s such a nice filly. She ran so great early in the year. I was glad she was able to get it done today. She really deserves this."

Life is Sweet finished second to Zenyatta in the Eclipse Award voting for champion older mare of 2009.

Life Is Sweet's last race was on February 13, 2010, when she finished second in the Santa Maria Handicap. On March 13, she was preparing for a run in the Dubai World Cup; however, after the workout, she suffered muscle cramps, and owner Marty Wygod decided to retire her. He said, "If she can't run at her best, I don't want to. [Shirreffs] got her right for the Breeders' Cup. She was compromised in most of her races because of her tying up. We don't want to take a risk with her."

== Retirement ==
She was bred to Smart Strike and foaled a colt in March 2011. The colt, later named Disintermediate, was euthanized after fracturing a pastern during a workout at Golden Gate in December 2013. She also has a 2012 Bernardini filly named Sweet Promises and a 2013 filly named Lady Pamela by Tapit.

== Pedigree ==
Pedigree of Life is Sweet, bay mare, 2005
Sire Storm Cat dkb/ 1983	Storm Bird b. 1978	Northern Dancer (CAN) b. 1961	Nearctic
Sire Storm Cat dkb/ 1983	Storm Bird b. 1978	Northern Dancer (CAN) b. 1961	Natalma
Sire Storm Cat dkb/ 1983	Storm Bird b. 1978	South Ocean b. 1967	New Providence
Sire Storm Cat dkb/ 1983	Storm Bird b. 1978	South Ocean b. 1967	Shining Sun
Sire Storm Cat dkb/ 1983	Terlingua ch. 1976	Secretariat ch. 1970	Bold Ruler
Sire Storm Cat dkb/ 1983	Terlingua ch. 1976	Secretariat ch. 1970	Somethingroyal
Sire Storm Cat dkb/ 1983	Terlingua ch. 1976	Crimson Saint ch. 1969	Crimson Satan
Sire Storm Cat dkb/ 1983	Terlingua ch. 1976	Crimson Saint ch. 1969	Bolero Rose
Dam Sweet Life dkb/ 1996	Kris S. dkb/ 1977	Roberto b. 1969	Hail to Reason
Dam Sweet Life dkb/ 1996	Kris S. dkb/ 1977	Roberto b. 1969	Bramalea
Dam Sweet Life dkb/ 1996	Kris S. dkb/ 1977	Sharp Queen b. 1965	Princequillo
Dam Sweet Life dkb/ 1996	Kris S. dkb/ 1977	Sharp Queen b. 1965	Bridgework
Dam Sweet Life dkb/ 1996	Symbolically b. 1983	Flying Paster b. 1976	Gummo
Dam Sweet Life dkb/ 1996	Symbolically b. 1983	Flying Paster b. 1976	Procne
Dam Sweet Life dkb/ 1996	Symbolically b. 1983	Hail to the Queen b. 1977	Native Royalty
Dam Sweet Life dkb/ 1996	Symbolically b. 1983	Hail to the Queen b. 1977	Instinctively (family 21)
