= D. Wayne Lukas Stakes =

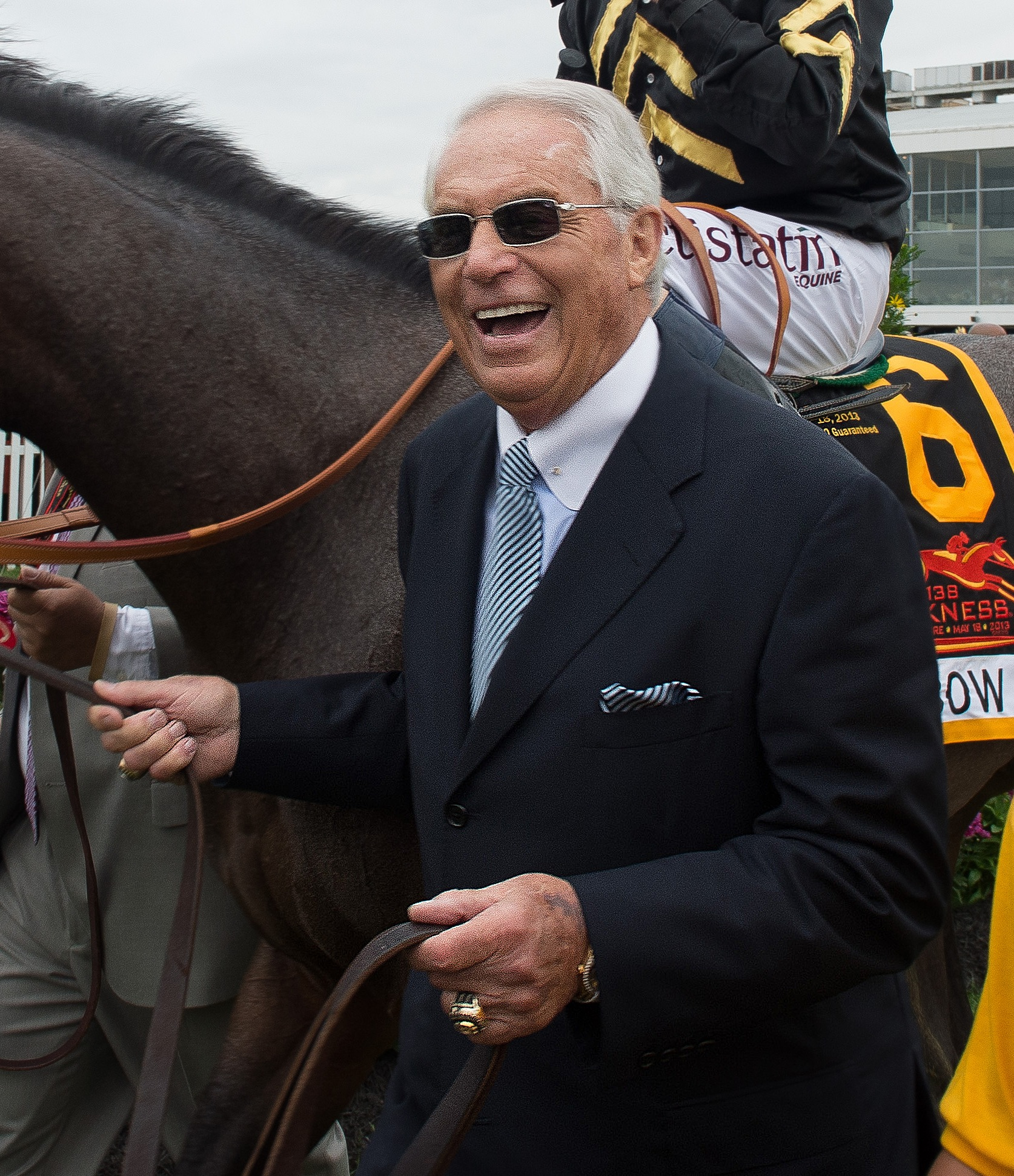
- D. Wayne Lukas, for whom the race is named
- Class: Grade II
- Location: Santa Anita Park; Arcadia, California, United States
- Inaugurated: 1957 (as Santa Monica Handicap)
- Race type: Thoroughbred – Flat racing
- Website: Santa Anita Park

Race information
- Distance: 7 furlongs
- Surface: Dirt
- Track: Left-handed
- Qualification: Fillies and Mares, four years old & up
- Weight: 124 lbs. with allowances
- Purse: US$200,000 (since 2014)

The D. Wayne Lukas Stakes is an American Grade II Thoroughbred horse race run annually in late January/early February at Santa Anita Park in Arcadia, California. Open to fillies and mares age four and older, it is run on the dirt over a distance of seven furlongs.

Inaugurated in 1957 as the Santa Monica Handicap, through 1959 it was open to horses three-year-olds and up of either sex. In 2010 the race was no longer run under handicap weight conditions, and was known as the Santa Monica Stakes until 2025.

In July 2025 Santa Anita's owners, 1/ST Racing and Gaming, announced that the Santa Monica Stakes would be renamed for the late trainer D. Wayne Lukas. Lukas won the Santa Monica six times, holding the record for most wins by a trainer in the race until Bob Baffert won the Santa Monica for the seventh time in 2023.

The race was run in two divisions in 1961 and 1965.

It was rated as GII in 1973–1983, GIII in 1984–1987, GII in 1988 and 1989, GI in 1990–2012, and GII in 2013 and later.

== Records ==
Speed record:

- 1:20.60 – Past Forgetting (1982) (dirt)

Most wins:

- Chop House (1964, 1965)
- Past Forgetting (1982, 1983)
- Pine Tree Lane (1987, 1988)
- Merneith (2021, 2022)

Most wins by a jockey:

- 6 – Bill Shoemaker (1961 (2×), 1963, 1980, 1982, 1985)

Most wins by a trainer:

- 8 – Bob Baffert (2006, 2007, 2010, 2019, 2021, 2022, 2023, 2026)

Most wins by an owner:

- 3 – C. V. Whitney (1959, 1960, 1961)
- 3 – William Haggin Perry (1965, 1966, 1969)
- 3 – Bernard J. Ridder (1978, 1982, 1983)

== Winners ==
Year	Winner	Age	Jockey	Trainer	Owner	Time
2026	Splendora	5	Juan J. Hernandez	Bob Baffert	By Talla Racing LLC	1:22.09
2025	Kopion	4	Antonio Fresu	Richard E. Mandella	Spendthrift Farm LLC	1:21.27
2024	Three Witches	5	Flavien Prat	Michael McCarthy	Yuesheng Zhang	1:23.21
2023	Fun to Dream	4	Juan Hernandez	Bob Baffert	Natalie J. Baffert & Connie Pageler	1:22.75
2022	Merneith	5	Edwin A. Maldonado	Bob Baffert	HRH Prince Sultan Bin Mishal Al Saud	1:22.39
2021	Merneith	4	Edwin A. Maldonado	Bob Baffert	HRH Prince Sultan Bin Mishal Al Saud	1:22.28
2020	Hard Not to Love	5	Mike E. Smith	John Shirreffs	Mercedes Stables, West Point Thoroughbreds, S. Dilworth, D. Ingordo, F. Mooney	1:22.19
2019	Marley's Freedom	5	Drayden Van Dyke	Bob Baffert	Cicero Farms, LLC	1:22.34
2018	Selcourt	4	Tyler Baze	John W. Sadler	Medallion Racing, Keith Abrahams, Sandra Lazaruk	1:21.00
2017	Finest City	5	Mike E. Smith	Ian Kruljac	Seltzer Thoroughbreds	1:21.49
2016	Lost Bus	4	Fernando Hernandez Perez	Gary Sherlock	Terry C. Lovingier	1:21.78
2015	Sam's Sister	4	Elvis Trujillo	Jerry Hollendorfer	Dedomenico/Hollendorfer/Todaro	1:22.42
2014	Scherzinger	4	Mike E. Smith	Jerry Hollendorfer	Hollendorfer/Dedomenico/et al.	1:22.00
2013	Teddy's Promise	5	Victor Espinoza	Ronald W. Ellis	Ted & Judy Nichols	1:22.64
2012	Home Sweet Aspen	4	Joel Rosario	John W. Sadler	CRK Stable	1:21.42
2011	Switch	4	Joel Rosario	John W. Sadler	CRK Stable	1:20.70
2010	Gabby's Golden Gal	4	Martin Garcia	Bob Baffert	Arnold Zetcher	1:21.25
2009	Ventura	5	Garrett K. Gomez	Robert J. Frankel	Juddmonte Farms	1:21.61
2008	Intangaroo	4	Alonso Quinonez	Gary Sherlock	Tom Grether Farms, Inc.	1:20.71
2007	Pussycat Doll	5	Garrett Gomez	Bob Baffert	Michael E. Pegram	1:22.32
2006	Behaving Badly	5	Victor Espinoza	Bob Baffert	Hal & Patti Earnhardt	1:21.93
2005	Salt Champ (ARG)	5	Gary Stevens	Richard Mandella	Arturo Vargas	1:22.14
2004	Island Fashion	4	Kent Desormeaux	Marcelo Polanco	Everest Stables	1:21.37
2003	Affluent	5	Alex Solis	Ron McAnally	Janis R. Whitham	1:22.77
2002	Kalookan Queen	6	Alex Solis	Bruce Headley	Louis Asistio	1:22.37
2001	Nany's Sweep	5	Kent Desormeaux	Kathy Walsh	Budget Stable	1:22.50
2000	Honest Lady	4	Corey Nakatani	Robert J. Frankel	Juddmonte Farms	1:21.45
1999	Stop Traffic	6	Corey Black	Richard Mandella	Diamond A Racing Corp.	1::22.17
1998	Exotic Wood	6	Chris McCarron	Ronald W. Ellis	Pam & Martin Wygod	1:21.07
1997	Toga Toga Toga	5	Julio A. Garcia	Eduardo Inda	Stanley J. Bell	1:23.27
1996	Serena's Song	4	Gary Stevens	D. Wayne Lukas	Robert & Beverly Lewis	1:21.56
1995	Key Phrase	4	Chris Antley	Ronald W. Ellis	Pam & Martin Wygod	1:22.82
1994	Southern Truce	6	Gary Stevens	Roger Stein	Regal Rose Stable	1:21.44
1993	Freedom Cry	5	Alex Solis	Gary F. Jones	Hi Card Ranch	1:21.78
1992	Laramie Moon	5	Eddie Delahoussaye	Neil D. Drysdale	Henry E. Pabst	1:22.66
1991	Devil's Orchid	4	Russell Baze	Richard Mandella	Shannon Farms	1:21.80
1990	Stormy But Valid	4	Gary Stevens	Brian A. Mayberry	Jan Siegel et al.	1:22.40
1989	Miss Brio	5	Eddie Delahoussaye	Neil D. Drysdale	William S. Farish III	1:21.60
1988	Pine Tree Lane	6	Gary Stevens	D. Wayne Lukas	William T. Young	1:23.00
1987	Pine Tree Lane	5	Ángel Cordero Jr.	D. Wayne Lukas	L. Don Mathis	1:21.80
1986	Her Royalty	5	Chris McCarron	Bruce Headley	Johnston et al.	1:21.60
1985	Lovlier Linda	5	Bill Shoemaker	Willard L. Proctor	William R. Hawn	1:22.80
1984	Bara Lass	5	Walter Guerra	D. Wayne Lukas	Sam E. Stevens	1:22.00
1983	Past Forgetting	5	Chris McCarron	Gordon Campbell	Bernard J. Ridder	1:23.40
1982	Past Forgetting	4	Bill Shoemaker	Gordon Campbell	Bernard. J. Ridder	1:20.60
1981	Parsley	5	Ángel Cordero Jr.	D. Wayne Lukas	Robert H. Spreen	1:23.40
1980	Flack Flack	5	Bill Shoemaker	D. Wayne Lukas	Blatz & Smith	1:23.80
1979	Grenzen	4	Laffit Pincay Jr.	Loren Rettele	Delaplaine/Schaffer/Woolsey	1:21.60
1979	Winter Solstice	6	Darrel McHargue	Gordon C. Campbell	Bernard J. Ridder	1:21.20
1977	Hail Hilarious	4	Don Pierce	Neil D. Drysdale	Saron Stable	1:22.60
1976	Gay Style	6	Don Pierce	Charles Whittingham	John Sikura Jr.	1:22.00
1975	Sister Fleet	5	Fernando Toro	Robert P. King	Gordon B. Howell	1:21.40
1974	Tizna	5	Fernando Toro	Henry M. Moreno	Nile Financial Corp.	1:24.00
1973	Chou Croute	5	John L. Rotz	Bob G. Dunham	Folsom Farm & Jones Jr.	1:23.60
1972	Typecast	6	Laffit Pincay Jr.	Tommy Doyle	Westerly Stud Farms	1:21.40
1971	Manta	5	Laffit Pincay Jr.	Farrell W. Jones	Elmendorf	1:22.20
1970	no race					
1969	Gamely	5	Wayne Harris	James W. Maloney	William Haggin Perry	1:23.60
1968	Amerigo Lady	4	Don Pierce	Robert L. Wheeler	Rokeby Stables	1:23.00
1967	Miss Moona	4	Laffit Pincay Jr.	Steve Ippolito	Jacnot Stable	1:22.40
1966	Batteur	6	Eddie Belmonte	James W. Maloney	William Haggin Perry	1:22.40
1965	Face The Facts	4	Manuel Ycaza	James W. Maloney	William Haggin Perry	1:22.00
1965	Chop House	5	Ismael Valenzuela	Ted Saladin	M/M Bert W. Martin	1:22.40
1964	Chop House	4	Braulio Baeza	Ted Saladin	M/M Bert W. Martin	1:22.80
1963	Table Mate	4	Bill Shoemaker	Warren Stute	Kerr Stable	1:22.00
1962	Perizade	6	Rudy Campas	Noble Threewitt	Dr. & Mrs. T. M. Brown	1:22.40
1961	Taboo	4	Bill Shoemaker	John H. Adams	Ralph Lowe	1:23.00
1961	Swiss Roll	4	Bill Shoemaker	Robert L. Wheeler	C. V. Whitney	1:22.20
1960	Silver Spoon	4	Eddie Arcaro	Robert L. Wheeler	C. V. Whitney	1:23.00
1959	Bug Brush	4	Angel Valenzuela	Robert L. Wheeler	C. V. Whitney	1:23.00
1958	Market Basket	4	Raymond York	Jack. M. Phillips	Connie M. Ring	1:22.80
1957	Mary Machree	6	George Taniguchi	William B. Finnegan	El Peco Ranch	1:22.00
