= Bruce Headley =

American horse trainer (1934–2021)

Personal information
- Born: February 14, 1934 Baldwin Park, California, United States
- Died: 15 January 2021 (aged 86)
- Occupation: Trainer/Owner

Horse racing career
- Sport: Horse racing
- Career wins: 967

Major racing wins
- Honeymoon Breeders' Cup Handicap (1979); Santa Ynez Stakes (1983); Carleton F. Burke Handicap (1984); Beverly Hills Handicap (1985); Wilshire Handicap (1985); Potrero Grande Handicap (1986, 1998, 2000, 2001, 2002, 2006); San Felipe Stakes (1986, 1992); San Marcos Stakes (1986); Santa Monica Handicap (1986, 2002); Santa Catalina stakes (1987); San Vicente Stakes (1987); La Brea Stakes (1989, 2002); Del Mar Futurity (1991); Norfolk Stakes (1991); Ancient Title Stakes (1996, 2000, 2002); Bing Crosby Handicap (1998, 2000, 2001, 2008); Triple Bend Invitational Handicap (1998, 2008); Los Angeles Handicap (1999, 2002, 2008); El Encino Stakes (2003); La Cañada Stakes (2003); Lady's Secret Breeders' Cup Handicap (2003); Lazaro Barrera Memorial Stakes (2005); Swaps Stakes (2005, 2006); Mervyn Leroy Handicap (2006, 2008); Santa Paula Stakes (2007); Strub Stakes (2007); Malibu Stakes (2009) American Classics / Breeders' Cup wins: Breeders' Cup Sprint (2000)

Significant horses
- Bertrando, Kona Gold, Got Koko, Silver Swallow

Bruce Edmund Headley (14 February 1934 – 15 January 2021) was a Thoroughbred horse trainer and owner.

== Biography ==
Involved with horse racing since his teens, Headley worked as an exercise rider from 1949 until taking out his trainers license in 1959. Based in California, he first gained national attention with Bertrando who won the 1991 Norfolk Stakes by a record nine lengths and went on to a second-place finish behind a brilliant performance by European star, Arazi. Headley's greatest success to date came with the Champion sprint horse Kona Gold, a winner of multiple stakes races including the 2000 Breeders' Cup Sprint. In addition to being the horse's trainer, Headley was also a one-third partner. He co-owned Kona Gold with Irwin Molasky.

In 2003, Headley trained Got Koko, owned by his wife Aase in partnership with Paul Leung. The filly was just the third-ever winner of the La Cañada Series at Santa Anita Park since its inception in 1975. The three-race series consists of the La Brea, El Encino and La Cañada Stakes for newly turning/turned 4-year old fillies run at an increasing distance.

== Death ==
Headley died on 15 January 2021 at the age of 86 years.
