= Wallace Dollase =

Personal information
- Born: August 1, 1937 Fort Atkinson, Wisconsin, U.S.
- Died: October 30, 2015 (aged 78) Louisville, Kentucky
- Resting place: Middletown Historical Cemetery, Middletown, Kentucky
- Occupation: Trainer / Owner

Horse racing career
- Sport: Horse racing
- Career wins: 522

Major racing wins
- Hollywood Derby (1990); Hollywood Turf Cup Stakes (1990, 1998); Elkhorn Stakes (1991); Shadwell Turf Mile Stakes (1991); El Encino Stakes (1994, 1996); Oak Tree Mile Stakes (1995); La Cañada Stakes (1996); Louisville Stakes (1996); Malibu Stakes (1996); San Luis Obispo Handicap (1996, 2001); San Luis Rey Handicap (1996, 2004); Strub Stakes (1996); Vanity Invitational Handicap (1996); Landaluce Stakes (1997); Santa Ana Handicap (1997); Santa Margarita Invitational Handicap (1997); Super Derby (1997, 2003); Travers Stakes (1997, 2003); Beldame Stakes (1998); Oak Tree Turf Championship Stakes (1998); Ruffian Handicap (1998); San Rafael Stakes (1998, 1999); American Derby (2002); Woodbine Mile (2002); Del Mar Handicap (2003); Illinois Derby (2003); Manhattan Handicap (2004); San Juan Capistrano Handicap (2004); All Along Stakes (2005); Chilukki Stakes (2005) Breeders' Cup wins: Breeders' Cup Distaff (1996)

Significant horses
- Deputy Commander, Itsallgreektome, Jewel Princess, Sharp Cat, Ten Most Wanted

Wallace Arthur "Wally" Dollase (August 1, 1937 – October 30, 2015) was an American trainer and owner of Thoroughbred racehorses.

Among his numerous Graded stakes race wins, Dollase won the 1996 Breeders' Cup Distaff with Jewel Princess who was voted that year's Eclipse Award as the American Champion Older Female Horse. He also trained the 1990 American Champion Male Turf Horse, Itsallgreektome.

Wally Dollase and his wife "Cincy" (Cynthia) have a son Craig, and three daughters, Michelle, Carrie and Aimee. Both son Craig and daughter Aimee became trainers.

Dollase died on October 30, 2015, after a lengthy illness.
