= Jack Van Berg =

American horse trainer

Personal information
- Born: June 7, 1936 Columbus, Nebraska, U.S.
- Died: December 27, 2017 (aged 81) Hot Springs, Arkansas
- Resting place: Crestview Memorial Park, Hot Springs, Arkansas
- Occupation: Trainer

Horse racing career
- Sport: Horse racing
- Career wins: 6,523

Major racing wins
- Black Gold Handicap (1965, 1966, 1967, 1971); Cornhusker Handicap (1972, 1973, 1985); Apple Blossom Handicap (1976); Hawthorne Gold Cup Handicap (1976); Secretariat Stakes (1976); Los Angeles Handicap (1979, 1985); Santa Anita Oaks (1981); Rebel Stakes (1982); Oaklawn Handicap (1983); Super Derby (1984, 1987); Fantasy Stakes (1985); Maryland Million Classic (1986); Hollywood Derby (1986); Hollywood Turf Cup Stakes (1987); Strub Stakes (1988); Woodward Stakes (1988); Meadowlands Cup (1988); Philip H. Iselin Handicap (1988); Santa Anita Handicap (1988); La Brea Stakes (1993); Landaluce Stakes (2007) American Classics / Breeders' Cup wins: Kentucky Derby (1987); Preakness Stakes (1984, 1987); Breeders' Cup Classic (1988)

Racing awards
- U.S. Champion Trainer by earnings (1976); U.S. Champion Trainer by wins (1968-70, 1972, 1974, 1976, 1983-84, 1986); Eclipse Award for Outstanding Trainer (1984); Big Sport of Turfdom Award (1987)

Honours
- National Museum of Racing and Hall of Fame (1985); Fair Grounds Racing Hall of Fame (1991)

Significant horses
- Gate Dancer, Alysheba

John Charles Van Berg (June 7, 1936 – December 27, 2017) was an American Hall of Fame horse trainer. Born into a horse racing family, his father was the Hall of Fame trainer, Marion Van Berg. Both father and son have been inducted into the National Museum of Racing and Hall of Fame in Saratoga Springs, New York.

For nineteen straight years between 1959 and 1977, Van Berg was the leading trainer at Ak-Sar-Ben Racetrack in Omaha, Nebraska. In 1976, he set a record for the most wins in a year with 496 and was also the United States Champion Thoroughbred Trainer by earnings.

The trainer of Gate Dancer, he was voted the 1984 Eclipse Award for Outstanding Trainer and in 1985 he was inducted into the National Museum of Racing and Hall of Fame. In 1987 he received the Big Sport of Turfdom Award. He is also an inductee of the Nebraska Racing Hall of Fame.

On July 15, 1987, Van Berg became the first trainer to win 5,000 races when he sent Art's Chandelle to victory at Arlington Park. As at the end of September 2008, Jack Van Berg ranks second all-time in career wins among American Thoroughbred trainers.

Van Berg is best known for training Alysheba who won the 1987 Kentucky Derby and Preakness Stakes and the 1988 Breeders' Cup Classic.

He mentored many top trainers, including Hall of Famer Bill Mott, Wayne Catalano, and Frank Brothers, all of whom started off as assistants to Van Berg who led all American trainers in wins nine times.

His life (and that of his father, Marion H. Van Berg) is chronicled in the book JACK, From Grit To Glory - A Lifetime of Mentoring, Dedication and Perseverance written by Nebraska native Chris Kotulak, published in 2013. The book was a semi-finalist in the 2014 Dr. Tony Ryan Book Award.
