= Jocky =

Jocky is a given name, and a hypocorism for John and James. Notable people with the name include:

- Jocky Dempster (born 1948), former Scottish footballer who played for Queen of the South, Mirren and Clyde
- Jocky Petrie (chef), Scottish professional chef
- Jocky Petrie (footballer) (1867–1932), former Scottish footballer who played for Arbroath
- Jocky Robertson (1926–2004), former Scottish footballer who played for Third Lanark and Berwick Rangers
- Jocky Scott (born 1948), Scottish football coach and former player
- Jocky Wilson (1950-2012), former Scottish darts champion
- Jocky Wilson Cup, professional darts team tournament, named after darts champion Jocky Wilson
- Jocky Wilson's Darts Challenge, computer game of darts, named after darts champion Jocky Wilson
- Jocky Wright (1873–1946), former Scottish footballer who played for Bolton Wanderers and The Wednesday

== See also ==
- Inspector Horse and Jocky, comic strip in the UK comic The Beano, drawn by Terry Bave
- Jock (disambiguation)
- Jockey, person who rides horses in horse racing or steeplechase racing
