= Terlingua (horse) =

American-bred Thoroughbred racehorse

- Sire: Secretariat
- Grandsire: Bold Ruler
- Dam: Crimson Saint
- Damsire: Crimson Satan
- Sex: Mare
- Foaled: 1976
- Country: United States
- Colour: Chestnut
- Breeder: Tom Gentry
- Owner: Overbrook Farm
- Trainer: D. Wayne Lukas
- Record: 17: 7–4–1
- Earnings: $423,896

Major wins
- Hollywood Juvenile Championship (1978); Hollywood Lassie Stakes (1978); Del Mar Debutante Stakes (1978); Nursery Stakes (1978); Santa Ynez Stakes (1979); Las Flores Handicap (1979); La Brea Stakes (1980)
- Last updated on November 13, 2011

Terlingua (February 7, 1976 – April 29, 2008) was an American Thoroughbred racehorse and broodmare bred in Kentucky by Tom Gentry. She was a chestnut filly from the second crop of Triple Crown winner Secretariat. Terlingua was out of a Crimson Satan mare, Crimson Saint, who was a graded stakes winner as well as a very successful broodmare. Besides Terlingua, Crimson Saint produced 1990 Ireland Champion 3yr-old and European Champion 3yr-old Miler Royal Academy and the grade one stakes winner (full brother) Pancho Villa along with four other winners, one of which was a minor stakes winner with another that was stakes placed.

Terlingua was a record-breaking stakes winner, and was also the dam of the two-time leading sire in North America, Storm Cat. Through him and Littleprincessemma, she was the great-great-grandam of 2015 U.S. Triple Crown winner American Pharoah. Terlingua was known as The Crown Princess.

== Race career ==
Terlingua was purchased by her trainer, Hall of Famer D. Wayne Lukas, as a yearling in 1977 for $275,000 on behalf of L. R. French, who later partnered with Barry Beal. Expected to be a winner, she lived up to the expectations. Her first race was a stakes at Hollywood Park. Terlingua won the Nursery Stakes by four and a half lengths and broke the stakes record. She then won the grade II Hollywood Lassie Stakes by three and a half lengths before she challenged males in the Hollywood Juvenile Championship, which she won by two and a half lengths. In her next start, she defeated fillies in the Del Mar Debutante by nine lengths. Talk of her replicating her father's Triple Crown sweep soon started. This, however, was not the case when Terlingua returned to the track as a 3-year-old, because she never regained her 2-year-old form. She did win two stakes at age 3, her 3yo debut Santa Ynez and 3yo finale Las Flores, while breaking the stakes record--she lost 5 in a row between these two stakes wins, and one more at age 4. She also broke one more stake record at 4, in the third running of the La Brea @ 7 furlongs, before she was retired at the end of that season to Overbrook Farms following an injury to her right front knee. Terlingua brought Lukas so much attention he made the decision to become a full-time thoroughbred trainer.

== Breeding career ==
Terlingua's greatest accomplishment came on the farm. Her first foal was a filly by Lyphard named Lyphard's Dancer who never raced. In 1983, she gave birth to her second foal, a brown colt by the stallion Storm Bird. Storm Cat was Terlingua's first stakes winner with his victory in the Grade 1 Young America Stakes. He later became one of the most influential stallions of recent times. At Storm Cat's height, he commanded a stud fee of (USD) $500,000; pensioned in 2008, he sired over 15 millionaires and many other stakes winners. In 1984, Terlingua gave birth to another stakes winner, a chestnut filly by Northern Dancer named Chapel of Dreams. She won the Grade II Palomar Handicap and Grade II Wilshire Handicap. Terlingua then gave birth to a Slew of Gold colt, Tiajuana. He was never a stakes winner but became a sire in India. Her next foal was a chestnut colt by Alydar named Provo, who became a very successful sire in Cyprus. Terlingua was bred back to Alydar the next year, and the result was her chestnut son Wheaton. He was a modest sire, getting many ungraded stakes winners.

In 1992, she gave birth to a Mr. Prospector filly named Pueblo who was later exported to South America. Bred back to Mr. Prospector in 1993, she produced Pioneering, a stallion who became a successful sire in the US, producing the Grade-1-winning mare Behaving Badly and the Jamaican Champion Sprinter Quite Strength. Terlingua then produced the first and only full sibling to Storm Cat, a brother called Namesake. He never became a winner or a sire. Two years later, she had a filly by Carson City named City Gold. In 2000, she gave birth to another filly, this one by Boston Harbor. Her last foal, a filly named Final Legacy, was very small and since Terlingua had missed several breeding seasons, her connections didn't want to push her any further and retired her from breeding.

Terlingua remained influential through her descendants. Her trainer, D. Wayne Lukas, said that Storm Cat and many of his offspring inherited her appearance, movement and temperament.[5] Terlingua was also the great-great-granddam of American Pharoah, winner of the 2015 U.S. Triple Crown.[2]

Progeny Record:

Name	Color	Sex	Year	Sire	Record	Earning
Lyphard's Dancer	ch	M	1982	Lyphard	0-0-0-0	Unraced
Storm Cat	br	H	1983	Storm Bird	8-4-3-0	$570,610
Chapel of Dreams	ch	M	1984	Northern Dancer	24-7-5-3	$643,912
Tiajuana	b	H	1986	Slew of Gold	24-3-2-2	$66,679
Provo	ch	H	1989	Alydar	24-2-2-3	$40,992
Wheaton	ch	H	1990	Alydar	11-1-2-1	$6,503
Pueblo	ch	M	1992	Mr. Prospector	4-0-0-1	$7,488
Pioneering	ch	H	1993	Mr. Prospector	6-2-0-0	$39,426
Namesake	ch	H	1996	Storm Bird	4-0-0-2	$6,940
City Gold	ch	M	1998	Carson City	0-0-0-0	Unraced
Final Legacy	dkb/br	M	2000	Boston Harbor	3-0-0-0	$960

== Death ==
Upon retirement in 2001, Terlingua was moved out into a pasture at the Young family's Overbrook Farm near Lexington, Kentucky, with a test mare named Ashley as a companion. There she spent her final years until her death in 2008. Terlingua was euthanized at the age of 32 on April 29 due to complications from the infirmities of old age. In significant honor to her brood-mare career, her lineage, and her racing descendants, she was buried in Overbrook's horse cemetery.

== Pedigree ==
Pedigree of Terlingua, chestnut mare, foaled February 7, 1976
Sire Secretariat chestnut 1970	Bold Ruler dkb/br. 1954	Nasrullah b. 1940	Nearco
Sire Secretariat chestnut 1970	Bold Ruler dkb/br. 1954	Nasrullah b. 1940	Mumtaz Begum
Sire Secretariat chestnut 1970	Bold Ruler dkb/br. 1954	Miss Disco b. 1944	Discovery
Sire Secretariat chestnut 1970	Bold Ruler dkb/br. 1954	Miss Disco b. 1944	Outdone
Sire Secretariat chestnut 1970	Somethingroyal b. 1952	Princequillo b. 1940	Prince Rose
Sire Secretariat chestnut 1970	Somethingroyal b. 1952	Princequillo b. 1940	Cosquilla
Sire Secretariat chestnut 1970	Somethingroyal b. 1952	Imperatrice dkb/br. 1938	Caruso
Sire Secretariat chestnut 1970	Somethingroyal b. 1952	Imperatrice dkb/br. 1938	Cinquepace
Dam Crimson Saint chestnut 1969	Crimson Satan ch. 1959	Spy Song dkb/br. 1943	Balladier
Dam Crimson Saint chestnut 1969	Crimson Satan ch. 1959	Spy Song dkb/br. 1943	Mata Hari
Dam Crimson Saint chestnut 1969	Crimson Satan ch. 1959	Papila ch. 1943	Requiebro
Dam Crimson Saint chestnut 1969	Crimson Satan ch. 1959	Papila ch. 1943	Papalona
Dam Crimson Saint chestnut 1969	Bolero Rose ch. 1958	Bolero ch. 1946	Eight Thirty
Dam Crimson Saint chestnut 1969	Bolero Rose ch. 1958	Bolero ch. 1946	Stepwisely
Dam Crimson Saint chestnut 1969	Bolero Rose ch. 1958	First Rose b. 1946	Menow
Dam Crimson Saint chestnut 1969	Bolero Rose ch. 1958	First Rose b. 1946	Rare Bloom (Family 8-c)
