= Don Pierce (jockey) =

American jockey (1937–2026)

Donald Pierce
Personal information
- Born: April 13, 1937 Clebit, Oklahoma, U.S.
- Died: October 5, 2026 (aged 89) Denton, Texas, U.S.
- Occupation: Jockey

Horse racing career
- Sport: Horse racing
- Career wins: 3,546

Major racing wins
- Gottstein Futurity (1957); Del Mar Handicap (1958, 1966); Longacres Mile (1958); Del Mar Debutante Stakes (1959, 1969, 1971, 1973); Santa Anita Handicap (1960, 1962, 1965, 1972); Santa Anita Oaks (1960, 1965, 1966, 1970, 1983); Margate Handicap (1961); Hopeful Stakes (1962); California Breeders' Champion Stakes (1963, 1964, 1967, 1970, 1974, 1978); Santa Anita Derby (1964, 1979); Sanford Stakes (1964); Acorn Stakes (1965); Schuylerville Stakes (1965); Del Mar Derby (1966, 1975, 1978); Hollywood Oaks (1966, 1969, 1973, 1978); Santa Ynez Stakes (1966, 1970, 1974); Santa Monica Handicap (1968, 1976, 1977); Hollywood Derby (1969, 1975, 1979); Los Angeles Handicap (1969, 1970, 1971, 1972, 1973); Santa Ana Handicap (1969, 1973, 1976); Santa Barbara Handicap (1969); Santa Margarita Handicap (1969, 1975, 1978); San Diego Handicap (1970); Californian Stakes (1973, 1974); Del Mar Oaks (1973, 1974, 1977); Bay Meadows Handicap (1974); Speakeasy Stakes (1974, 1978); Lawrence Realization Stakes (1976); Santa Maria Handicap (1976, 1977); Hollywood Lassie Stakes (1977)

Racing awards
- George Woolf Memorial Jockey Award (1967)

Honors
- U.S. Racing Hall of Fame (2010)

Significant horses
- Ack Ack, Amerigo Lady, B. Thoughtful, Flying Paster, Hill Rise, Kennedy Road, Princessnessian, Quack, Silky Sullivan, Triple Bend

Donald Pierce (April 13, 1937 – October 5, 2026) was an American hall of fame jockey in thoroughbred horse racing.

== Life and career ==
Based in California, Pierce earned his first win in 1954 and went on to become a leading jockey in the 1960s and 1970s. In 1967, he was voted the George Woolf Memorial Jockey Award which honors a rider whose career and personal conduct exemplifies the very best example of participants in the sport of thoroughbred racing. Of this recognition by his peers, Pierce said "I've got the trophy sitting on my mantle and it's very important to me. Without a doubt, it ranks close to anything I ever achieved in racing. It's very, very special."

Pierce was a four-time winner of California's most prestigious race, the Santa Anita Handicap, and twice won the most important West Coast race for three-year-olds, the Santa Anita Derby. Out of five appearances in the Kentucky Derby, his best result came in 1980 edition when he rode Elmendorf Farm's Super Moment to a fourth-place finish. The 1979 Preakness Stakes was his only appearance in that race in which he finished fourth aboard Flying Paster.

Between 1969 and 1973, Pierce set a California stakes race record by winning five straight editions of the Los Angeles Handicap.

During his career, Don Pierce won riding titles at New York state's Saratoga Race Course and Belmont Park. After not riding at Del Mar for six years, he returned to compete there in 1966 and won the riding title. In addition, he led all jockeys in North America with 32 stakes wins.

He was retired and living in Encinitas, not far from the Del Mar Racetrack. As of 2007, he was still involved in the industry, maintaining an ownership stake in at least one racehorse. In 2010 he was back to a familiar lifestyle, getting up in the middle of the night to get to work by 4:30 am at the Del Mar track to be part of the clocker crew.

In 2010, Don Pierce received racing's highest honor when he was voted into the National Museum of Racing and Hall of Fame.

His brother, Larry Pierce, was also a jockey who rode on the West Coast. There, he was known for his success at race tracks in Washington state and in 2008 was inducted into the Washington Racing Hall of Fame.

Pierce died in Denton Texas on October 5, 2026, at the age of 89.
