= Lakeway (horse) =

American-bred Thoroughbred racehorse

- Sire: Seattle Slew
- Grandsire: Bold Reasoning
- Dam: Milliardaire
- Damsire: Alydar
- Sex: filly
- Foaled: 1991
- Country: United States
- Colour: Bay
- Breeder: Michael G. Rutherford
- Owner: Michael G. Rutherford
- Trainer: Gary F. Jones
- Record: 14: 7-3-3
- Earnings: US$$965,330

Major wins
- Hollywood Oaks (1994); Las Virgenes Stakes (1994); Mother Goose Stakes (1994); Santa Anita Oaks (1994); Churchill Downs Distaff Handicap (1995)

Lakeway (foaled February 19, 1991 in Kentucky) is an American Thoroughbred racehorse who in six starts in 1994 for trainer Gary Jones won four Grade I stakes and was second in two others.

== Racing ==
Bred and raced by Michael G. Rutherford, Lakeway was out of the mare Milliardaire, a daughter of Hall of Fame inductee Alydar. Her sire was Seattle Slew, the 1977 U.S. Triple Crown winner and a Hall of Fame inductee. After her fourth Grade I win, Lakeway ran second in the August 13, 1994 Alabama Stakes at Saratoga Race Course. Injured in the race, she did not return to racing for a full year. In her third race in 1995 she finished third in the October 28 Breeders' Cup Distaff then won the November 11 Grade II Churchill Downs Breeders' Cup Handicap.

== Broodmare ==
Lakeway was retired to broodmare duty for owner Michael Rutherford. The racing success of a daughter of Seattle Slew ensured that she would be bred to some of the best stallions or stallion prospects available. However, her offspring from the likes of Giant's Causeway, Fusaichi Pegasus, Storm Cat, Seeking The Gold met with only modest success in racing.

Pedigree of Lakeway
Sire Seattle Slew	Bold Reasoning	Boldnesian	Bold Ruler
Sire Seattle Slew	Bold Reasoning	Boldnesian	Alanesian
Sire Seattle Slew	Bold Reasoning	Return To Earn	Hail To Reason
Sire Seattle Slew	Bold Reasoning	Return To Earn	Sailing Home
Sire Seattle Slew	My Charmer	Poker	Round Table
Sire Seattle Slew	My Charmer	Poker	Glamour
Sire Seattle Slew	My Charmer	Fair Charmer	Jet Action
Sire Seattle Slew	My Charmer	Fair Charmer	Myrtle Charm
Dam Milliardaire	Alydar	Raise a Native	Native Dancer
Dam Milliardaire	Alydar	Raise a Native	Raise You
Dam Milliardaire	Alydar	Sweet Tooth	On-and-On
Dam Milliardaire	Alydar	Sweet Tooth	Plum Cake
Dam Milliardaire	Priceless Fame	Irish Castle	Bold Ruler
Dam Milliardaire	Priceless Fame	Irish Castle	Castle Forbes
Dam Milliardaire	Priceless Fame	Comely Nell	Commodore M.
Dam Milliardaire	Priceless Fame	Comely Nell	Nellie L.
