= Robert L. Wheeler =

American horse trainer

Personal information
- Born: June 21, 1920 Crawford, Nebraska
- Died: April 12, 1992 (aged 71) Arcadia, California
- Resting place: Eternal Hills Memorial Park; Oceanside, California
- Occupation: Trainer

Horse racing career
- Sport: Horse racing
- Career wins: 1,336

Major racing wins
- Hollywood Lassie Stakes (1955, 1977); Hollywood Juvenile Championship Stakes (1957, 1961, 1963, 1965, 1975); Santa Anita Derby (1959, 1960); Santa Margarita Invitational Handicap (1959, 1960, 1978); Bernard Baruch Handicap (1960, 1967); Blue Grass Stakes (1960); Hollywood Gold Cup (1960, 1963); Arlington-Washington Lassie Stakes (1965); San Miguel Stakes (1966); San Juan Capistrano Handicap (1969); Del Mar Derby (1971); Vanity Invitational Handicap (1981); Wilshire Handicap (1981); Apple Blossom Handicap (1982); Morven Stakes (1984); Tremont Stakes (1984); Paumonok Handicap (1986)

Honors
- National Museum of Racing and Hall of Fame (2011)

Significant horses
- B. Thoughtful, Bug Brush, Dotted Swiss, Miss Todd, Tompion, Taisez Vous, Track Robbery, Silver Spoon, Old Pueblo

Robert L. Wheeler (June 21, 1920 – April 12, 1992) was an American Hall of Fame trainer of Thoroughbred racehorses.

Among his successful runners, Wheeler conditioned the 1959 American Champion Three-Year-Old Filly, Silver Spoon as well as Track Robbery who was voted the 1982 American Champion Older Female Horse.

Robert Wheeler trained professionally from 1938 through to his death at age 71 in 1992.

== Family ==
A native of Crawford, Nebraska, he was raised by his parents, James C. and Anna Wheeler. He has 4 brothers and 4 sisters, Jack, Bill, Jim, Jerry, Rita, Pat, Jean and Joanne.
