= John W. Sadler =

American horse trainer

Personal information
- Born: 30 July 1956 (age 70) Long Beach, California, United States
- Occupation: Trainer

Horse racing career
- Sport: Horse racing
- Career wins: 2,807 (ongoing)

Major racing wins
- Los Angeles Handicap (1986, 1988, 2003, 2009, 2010); Bing Crosby Handicap (1988, 1999, 2019); Ancient Title/Santa Anita Sprint Championship (1988, 1991, 1995, 2008); San Felipe Stakes (1993, 2010); Rancho Bernardo Handicap (1995, 1996, 1997, 2008, 2018); San Diego Handicap (2003, 2013, 2017, 2018, 2019); Vanity/Beholder Mile (2004, 2014, 2017); Lady's Secret/Zenyatta (2005, 2006, 2011, 2016); Santa Margarita Invitational Handicap (2006); Clement L. Hirsch Handicap (2006, 2014, 2016, 2017, 2019); Del Mar Derby (2006, 2010, 2013); Churchill Downs Stakes (2021); La Brea Stakes (2007, 2009, 2010) San Vicente Stakes (2007, 2009, 2010, 2014); John C. Mabee Handicap (2008, 2011, 2015); Santa Anita Oaks (2010, 2015); Santa Anita Derby (2010, 2021); Arkansas Derby (2010); Humana Distaff Stakes (2010); Hollywood/Summertime Oaks (2010, 2011, 2015); Del Mar Debutante Stakes (2010) Malibu Stakes (2010); Santa Monica Stakes (2011, 2012, 2018); Las Virgenes Stakes (2011); San Antonio Stakes (2011, 2018, 2019); American Oaks Stakes (2012); Del Mar Oaks (2012); Shoemaker Mile Stakes (2015); Gold Cup at Santa Anita Stakes (2015, 2018); Apple Blossom Handicap (2017); Santa Anita Handicap (2018, 2019, 2020); Pacific Classic Stakes (2018, 2019, 2021, 2022); Awesome Again Stakes (2018); Malibu Stakes (2021) Breeders' Cup wins: Breeders' Cup Classic (2018, 2022); Breeders' Cup Dirt Mile (2024) International race wins: Dubai Golden Shaheen (2004)

Racing awards
- Training Titles; Hollywood Park (2007 autumn); Hollywood Park (2008 spring-summer); Del Mar (2008); Oak Tree (2008); Santa Anita (2008-09 winter-spring); Del Mar (2009); Hollywood Park (2009 autumn); Santa Anita (2009-10 winter-spring); Santa Anita (2011 autumn); Hollywood Park (2013 spring-summer); Del Mar (2013); Santa Anita (2013-14 winter-spring)

Significant horses
- Accelerate, Stellar Wind, Rock Your World, Sidney's Candy, Black Mamba, Flightline, Hard Aces, Higher Power, Switch, Twirling Candy

John W. Sadler (born July 30, 1956) is an American horse trainer in the sport of Thoroughbred horse racing. He currently has over 2,600 race wins, including the 2018 Breeders' Cup Classic with Accelerate, who was subsequently named American Horse of the Year. He has won multiple training titles at Santa Anita Park, Del Mar and the now defunct Hollywood Park. Sadler trained Flightline, the winner of the 2022 Breeders' Cup Classic.

== Background ==
Sadler was born on July 30, 1956, in Long Beach, California. He attended the University of Oregon before returning to Southern California to work as a veterinary assistant. He took out his trainer's license in 1978. He currently resides in Pasadena.

== Racing career ==
Sadler got his first win in 1979 at Golden Gate Fields racetrack in the San Francisco Bay Area. His first graded stakes win came in 1982 when Don Roberto won the Rolling Green Handicap. His first Grade I winner was Victory Encounter, who took the 2004 Vanity Handicap.

In April 1991, Sadler won Santa Anita's first-ever match race when his trainee Valiant Pete took on champion American Quarter Horse Griswold in a $100,000 winner-take-all race. Racing at the unusual distance of four furlongs (short for a Thoroughbred, long for a Quarter Horse), Valiant Pete set a world record of 0:44 2/5.

At Hollywood Park on June 28, 2008, Sadler won three stakes races when Whatsthescript won the Grade 2 American Handicap, Dearest Trickski triumphed in the Grade 2 A Gleam Handicap and Emmy Darling took the Landaluce Stakes. On December 26, 2010, he repeated this performance at Santa Anita, when Twirling Candy won the Grade I Malibu Stakes, Switch won the Grade I La Brea Stakes and Sidney's Candy won the Grade II Sir Beaufort Stakes. Sadler won three stakes races for the third time at Hollywood Park on July 17, 2012, when Scherer Magic won the Grade 3 Hollywood Juvenile Championship, Switch in the Grade 2 A Gleam Handicap and Lady of Shamrock in the Grade 1 Hollywood Oaks.

In 2011, Sadler surpassed $70 million earned in purses. His career purse earnings reached $100 million in 2015.

In November 2012, Sadler won his 2,000th race when Rooster City won a claiming race at Betfair Hollywood Park.

Sadler has won multiple training titles at Hollywood Park, Santa Anita and Del Mar.

Sadler was winless at the Breeders' Cup until 2018, although he did finish second in the 2015 Distaff with Stellar Wind, second in the 2010 Filly & Mare Sprint with Switch and third in the 2016 Dirt Mile, 2014 Distaff, 2014 Juvenile Turf, 2012 Filly and Mare Sprint, 2009 Sprint and 2008 Mile. He finally broke through by winning the Classic with Accelerate, who earned American Champion Older Dirt Male Horse honors. He won it again in 2022 with Flightline, one of the best horses the racing world have ever seen.

Other top thoroughbreds for Sadler include Alpha Kitten, Appealing Missy, Belmont Cat, Black Mamba, Cost of Freedom, Dawn After Dawn, Dearest Trickski, Evita Argentina, Frost Free, Geronimo, Get Funky, Hasty Kris, Healthy Addiction, Lady of Shamrock, Musique Toujours, Noble Court, Oil Man, Olympic Prospect, Tasha's Miracle, Taste of Paradise, Three Peat, Tizbud, Track Gal, Victory Encounter and Zappa.
