= Martin J. Wygod =

American businessman (1940–2024)

Martin Wygod
- Born: February 1, 1940; New York City, New York, U.S.
- Died: April 11, 2024 (aged 84); La Jolla, California, U.S.
- Education: New York University
- Occupation(s): Stockbroker, entrepreneur, merchant banker, racehorse owner and breeder
- Known for: Founder: Medco Containment Services, Inc.
- Board member of: WebMD Health Corporation, HLTH Corporation, Del Mar Thoroughbred Club
- Spouse: Pamela Wygod
- Children: 2

Martin J. Wygod (February 1, 1940 – April 11, 2024) was an American businessman and a prominent Thoroughbred racehorse owner and breeder.

== Business career ==
A business administration graduate from New York University, he joined a Wall Street stock brokerage firm before becoming a managing partner in a similar firm.

In 1964, Wygod became involved with Computer Sciences Corporation (CSC) in California, run by founders Roy Nutt and Fletcher Jones. In the 1970s he shifted his focus to the burgeoning health care industry, buying Glasrock Medical Services in 1977 and after five years of solid growth, sold it for a large profit. In 1983 he established Medco Containment Services, Inc. and built it into the largest mail order pharmacy in the United States. In 1993 Wygod sold Medco to Merck & Co. for more than US$6 billion.

Wygod was Chairman of WebMD and of HLTH Corporation, an Elmwood Park, New Jersey, technology company providing healthcare information services.

== Thoroughbred racing ==
Since boyhood, Martin Wygod had a love of horses and the sport of Thoroughbred horse racing. Growing up in New York he spent time as a hot walker at Belmont Park and Aqueduct Racetrack. As a result of his friendship with Fletcher Jones of CSC, Wygod first became a Thoroughbred owner when Jones gave him two racehorses, Verification and Heliotropic, as a 25th birthday gift. Fletcher Jones owned Westerly Stud Farms near Santa Ynez, California and was involved in horse racing for several years until his untimely death in 1972.

From 1975 the Wygods owned the 240-acre (0.97 km^{2}) River Edge Farm near Buellton in the Santa Ynez Valley. In 1995, they left the East Coast of the United States to make their home on a 110-acre (0.45 km^{2}) estate in Rancho Santa Fe, California. A member of The Jockey Club, Martin Wygod and his wife Pamela began devoting more time to their horses and became major players in Thoroughbred racing. Their River Edge Farm was the leading breeder in California in 2006, 2007 and 2008.

In 1996 Martin Wygod became a trustee of the Thoroughbred Owners and Breeders Association and served on the Board of Directors of the Del Mar Thoroughbred Club. Pamela Wygod also oversees two foundations, the Rose Foundation and the WebMD Health Foundation. They are supporters of Breeders' Cup Charities.

Lefty Nickerson was the first trainer hired to condition Wygod's horses for racing. One of their early stakes race wins came in the 1973 Derby Trial with the colt, Settecento. As of 2009, their trainer is John Shirreffs. Other successful racehorses raced by Martin and Pamela Wygod include:

- Exotic Wood (b. 1992) - won G1s Go For Wand Handicap, Santa Monica Handicap, Santa Maria Handicap
- Tranquility Lake (b. 1995) - multiple Grade 1 winner and successful broodmare for the Wygods. Her 2004 colt (later named Jalil) sired by Storm Cat was sold at the September 2005 Keeneland Sales for $9.7 million
- Sweet Catomine (b. 2002) - American Champion Two-Year-Old Filly. Won 2004 Breeders' Cup Juvenile Fillies
- After Market (b. 2003) - son of Tranquility Lake. Won four straight graded stakes including back-to-back Grade 1s, the Charles Whittingham Memorial and Eddie Read Handicaps
- Life Is Sweet (b. 2005) - in 2009 won the G1 Breeders' Cup Ladies' Classic and Santa Margarita Invitational Handicap

== Death ==
Del Mar Thoroughbred Club announced on April 12, 2024, that Wygod had died the previous day at Scripps Hospital in La Jolla, at the age of 84.
