= Eddie Delahoussaye =

American jockey (born 1951)

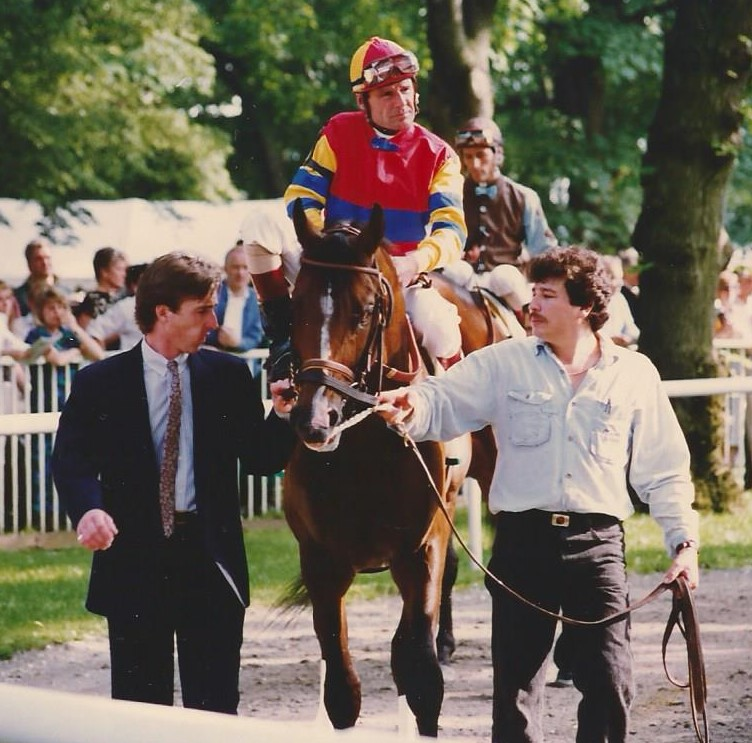
- Eddie Delahoussaye on A.P. Indy in 1992

Personal information
- Born: September 21, 1951 (age 74) New Iberia, Louisiana, U.S.
- Occupation: Jockey

Horse racing career
- Sport: Horse racing
- Career wins: 6,384

Major racing wins
- Kentucky Oaks (1980, 1994); Baldwin Stakes (1982, 1988, 1989, 1995, 1998); Santa Barbara Handicap (1983, 1988, 1989, 1991, 1999); Hawthorne Gold Cup Handicap (1984); Jockey Club Gold Cup (1991); John C. Mabee Handicap (1987, 2002); San Diego Handicap (1982, 1984, 2002); Eddie Read Handicap (1980, 1982, 1988, 1989); Bing Crosby Handicap (1981, 1985, 1986, 1992, 1995); Palomar Handicap (1980, 1988, 2000, 2001); Del Mar Derby (1984, 1986, 1987, 1992, 2000); Del Mar Futurity (1981, 1982); Pacific Classic Stakes (1994, 1995); Santa Anita Derby (1984, 1992); Whitney Handicap (1983); Woodbine Mile (1989); Longacres Mile (1998); Royal Heroine Stakes (2000); Las Cienegas Handicap (2002) American Classics wins: Kentucky Derby (1982, 1983); Preakness Stakes (1988); Belmont Stakes (1988, 1992) Breeders' Cup wins: Breeders' Cup Distaff (1984, 1993); Breeders' Cup Turf (1989); Breeders' Cup Juvenile Fillies (1991); Breeders' Cup Classic (1992); Breeders' Cup Sprint (1992, 1993)

Racing awards
- United States Champion Jockey by wins (1978); George Woolf Memorial Jockey Award (1981)

Honours
- Fair Grounds Racing Hall of Fame (1991); U.S. Racing Hall of Fame (1993); Louisiana Sports Hall of Fame (2002)

Significant horses
- Sunny's Halo, Gato Del Sol, Risen Star, A.P. Indy, Prized, Princess Rooney, Gate Dancer, Bold 'n Determined
- Updated on February 19, 2007

Edward J. Delahoussaye (born September 21, 1951) is a retired American Thoroughbred jockey from New Iberia, Louisiana.

He began his career in 1968 and ten years later became the top American jockey with 384 wins. He has won the Kentucky Derby in two consecutive years, riding Gato Del Sol in 1982 and Sunny's Halo in 1983 after finishing second in the 1981 Derby.

In addition to his wins at the Kentucky Derby, he won the 1988 Preakness Stakes and the 1988 and 1992 Belmont Stakes as well as seven Breeders' Cup races.

Eddie Delahoussaye was awarded the George Woolf Memorial Jockey Award in 1981. He was inducted into the Fair Grounds Racing Hall of Fame in 1991 and in 1993 into the National Museum of Racing and Hall of Fame.

He retired from horse racing in January 2003 as a result of injuries to his head and neck suffered in a fall at Del Mar Racetrack. Over his 34-year career, he is the 15th winningest jockey, with 6,384 races won. In terms of monetary winnings, he is also 15th all time, having earned $195,881,170 in his career.

In 2006 Delahoussaye wrote the preface to Santa Anita Morning Rhapsody, by photographer-author Karen S. Davis, a book that documents morning thoroughbred racetrack training. "All of the moments that define the morning at Santa Anita are captured in the stunning photography of this book," he wrote. "Morning at Santa Anita racetrack is like no other time or place on earth."

Eddie Delahoussaye remains active in the horse racing industry and is a member of the board of directors of the Edwin J. Gregson Foundation and a Commissioner of the Louisiana Racing Commission.

Chart (2000–2002)	Peak position
National Earnings List for Jockeys 2000	23
National Earnings List for Jockeys 2001	17
National Earnings List for Jockeys 2002	35
