= Gold Cup at Santa Anita top three finishers =

This is a listing of the horses that finished in first, second, and third place (and the number of starters) in the Gold Cup at Santa Anita Stakes (formerly the Hollywood Gold Cup), an American Grade 1 race for three-year-olds and up at 1 1/4 miles on dirt (except 2007-2013 when on the synthetic surface, 'Cushion Track'). Since 2014, it has been held at Santa Anita Park in Arcadia, California; earlier runnings were held at Hollywood Park. (List - 1938 to Present)

Year	Winner	Second	Third	Starters
2016	Melatonin	Win the Space	Hard Aces	8
2015	Hard Aces	Hoppertunity	Catch a Flight	11
2014	Majestic Harbor	Clubhouse Ride	Imperative	7
2013	Game On Dude	Kettle Korn	Sky Kingdom	5
2012	Game On Dude	Richard's Kid	Kettle Corn	7
2011	First Dude	Game On Dude	Setsuko	8
2010	Awesome Gem	Rail Trip	Richard's Kid	6
2009	Rail Trip	Tres Borrachos	Life Is Sweet	13
2008	Mast Track	Student Council	Go Between	9
2007	Lava Man	A. P. Xcellent	Big Booster	9
2006	Lava Man	Ace Blue	Super Frolic	5
2005	Lava Man	Borrego	Congrats	9
2004	Total Impact	Olmodavor	Even the Score	7
2003	Congaree	Harlan's Holiday	Kudos	7
2002	Sky Jack	Momentum	Milwaukee Brew	6
2001	Aptitude	Skimming	Futural	5
2000	Early Pioneer	General Challenge	David	9
1999	Real Quiet	Budroyale	Malek	4
1998	Skip Away	Puerto Madero	Gentlemen	8
1997	Gentlemen	Siphon	Sandpit	6
1996	Siphon	Geri	Helmsman	8
1995	Cigar	Tinners Way	Tossofthecoin	8
1994	Slew of Damascus	Fanmore	Del Mar Dennis	5
1993	Best Pal	Bertrando	Major Impact	10
1992	Sultry Song	Marquetry	Another Review	6
1991	Marquetry	Farma Way	Itsallgreektome	9
1990	Criminal Type	Sunday Silence	Opening Verse	7
1989	Blushing John	Sabona	Payant	7
1988	Cutlass Reality	Alysheba	Ferdinand	6
1987	Ferdinand	Judge Angelucci	Tasso	11
1986	Super Diamond	Alphabatim	Precisionist	6
1985	Greinton	Precisionist	King's Island	6
1984	Desert Wine	John Henry	Sari's Dreamer	8
1983	Island Whirl	Poley	Prince Spellbound	6
1982	Perrault	Erins Isle	It's the One	8
1981	Eleven Stitches	Caterman	Super Moment	10
1980	Go West Young Man	Balzac	Caro Bambino	10
1979	Affirmed	Sirlad	Text	10
1978	Exceller	Text	Vigors	7
1977	Crystal Water	Cascapedia	Caucasus	12
1976	Pay Tribute	Avatar	Riot in Paris	8
1975	Ancient Title	Big Band	El Tarta	7
1974	Tree of Knowledge	Ancient Title	War Heim	10
1973	Kennedy Road	Quack	Cougar II	6
1972	Quack	Droll Role	War Heim	14
1971	Ack Ack	Comtal	Manta	8
1970	Pleasure Seeker	Neurologo	T V Commercial	7
1969	Figonero	Nodouble	Poleax	6
1968	Princessnesian	Racing Room	Quicken Tree	11
1967	Native Diver	Pretense	Biggs	5
1966	Native Diver	O'Hara	Travel Orb	10
1965	Native Diver	Babington	Hill Rise	7
1964	Colorado King	Mustard Plaster	Native Diver	11
1963	Cadiz	Aldershot	Olympiad King	10
1962	Prove It	Windy Sands	Cadiz	12
1961	Prince Blessed	Grey Eagle	Whodunit	14
1960	Dotted Swiss	Bagdad	Prize Host	8
1959	Hillsdale	Find	Terrang	8
1958	Gallant Man	Eddie Schmidt	Seaneen	5
1957	Round Table	Porterhouse	Find	11
1956	Swaps	Mister Gus	Porterhouse	7
1955	Rejected	Alidon	Determine	6
1954	Correspondent	Rejected	Trusting	7
1953	Royal Serenade	Fleet Bird	A Gleam	7
1952	Two Lea	Cyclotron	Sturdy One	12
1951	Citation	Bewitch	Be Fleet	10
1950	Noor	Palestinian	Hill Prince	8
1949	Solidarity	Ace Admiral	Pretal	11
1948	Shannon	On Trust	Olhaverry	9
1947	Cover Up	Burning Dream	Honeymoon	12
1946	Triplicate	Honeymoon	Historian	16
1945	Challenge Me	Bull Reigh	Sirde	12
1944	Happy Issue	Bull Reigh	Okana	13
1943; 1942	Not held - World War II			
1941	Big Pebble	Paperboy	Mioland	13
1940	Challedon	Specify	Can't Wait	11
1939	Kayak II	Cravat	Specify	7
1938	Seabiscuit	Specify	Whichcee	10
