= Fordham (horse) =

American-bred Thoroughbred racehorse

- Sire: Forli
- Grandsire: Aristophanes
- Dam: Bold Enchantress
- Damsire: Bold Ruler
- Sex: Stallion
- Foaled: 30 March 1975
- Country: United States
- Colour: Bay
- Breeder: Lyonstown Stud
- Owner: Robert Sangster
- Trainer: Vincent O'Brien
- Record: 8: 4-1-0

Major wins
- Cumberland Lodge Stakes (1978); Joe McGrath Memorial Stakes (1979)

Awards
- Timeform rating 116 (1978), 117 (1979)

Fordham (30 March 1975 – after 1987) was an American-bred, Irish-trained Thoroughbred racehorse and sire. As three-year-old in 1978 he won two minor races before recording his first important victory in the Cumberland Lodge Stakes. In the following year he showed little worthwhile form in his first three starts but then had his biggest success when taking the Group 1 Joe McGrath Memorial Stakes on his final racecourse appearance. After his retirement from racing, he became a breeding stallion in Ireland before being exported to South Africa where he had some success as a sire of winners.

== Background ==
Fordham was an "attractive" bay horse bred in Kentucky by the Irish-based Lyonstown Stud. The colt was sent to race in Europe where he entered training with Vincent O'Brien at Ballydoyle. During his racing career he carried the green and blue colours of the British businessman Robert Sangster.

His sire Forli was a champion in his native Argentina before becoming a successful breeding stallion in the United States. His best-known offspring was Forego, the three-time American Horse of the Year, whilst his European runners included Thatch and Sadeem. Fordham was the first foal produced by Bold Enchantress who won one minor race in Ireland as a two-year-old in 1972. She was a daughter of Princessnesian and a granddaughter of Alanesian, making her a close relative of many good winners including Boldnesian, Asiatic Boy, Devil May Care, Cryptoclearance and Revidere.

== Racing career ==
=== 1978: three-year-old season ===
Fordham was unraced as a two-year-old and did not appear on a racecourse until June 1978 when he won a minor race over one mile at Leopardstown. He was then moved up in distance and assigned top weight for a handicap race over ten furlongs at the same track in which he finished second by a head to the filly Endeavorer. The colt was then dropped back to nine furlongs and won a minor event at Leopardstown in July. In September the colt was sent to England and stepped up in class and distance for the Group 3 Cumberland Lodge Stakes over one and a half miles at Ascot Racecourse and started at odds of 4/1 against a field which included the Park Hill Stakes winner Idle Waters. Ridden by Pat Eddery he took the lead five furlongs from the finish, went clear of the field in the straight, and stayed on to win by one and a half lengths from Idle Waters who dead-heated for second with the four-year-old Town and Country.

At the end of the year Fordham was given a rating of 116 by the independent Timeform organisation, making him 22 pounds inferior to his stablemate Alleged who was Timeform's Horse of the Year, and 15 pounds behind their best three-year-old colt Ile de Bourbon. In the official International Classification he was rated 14 pounds behind Ile de Bourbon, who was the top-rated three-year-old.

=== 1979: four-year-old season ===
Fordham struggled for form in his first three races of 1979. He finished unplaced over ten furlongs on his first two starts he finished fourth behind the five-year-old Orchestra in the Whitehall Stakes over nine furlongs at Phoenix Park Racecourse in early September. On 22 September Fordham, equipped with blinkers, was one of six horses to contest the fourth running of the Group 1 Joe McGrath Memorial Stakes over ten furlongs at Leopardstown. He was partnered by Tommy Carberry, a jockey best known for his successes under National Hunt rules. The three-year-old Dickens Hill started odds-on favourite ahead of the British colt Two of Diamonds (Dee Stakes) and Orchestra with Fordham next in the betting on 14/1 alongside Icelandic (John Porter Stakes). Fordham went to the front soon after the start, opened up a clear lead on the final turn and kept on well in the straight to hold off the late run of Two of Diamonds to win by three-quarters of a length. He never raced again and was retired to stud at the end of the year.

Timeform gave Fordham a slightly improved rating of 117 for his performances in 1979 twenty pounds behind their Horse of the Year Troy. The International Classification saw him again rated 14 pounds behind Ile de Bourbon, who was the highest-rated older horse.

== Stud record ==
Fordham began his career as a breeding stallion at the Coolmore Stud in 1980. He was exported to South Africa in 1982 and his last foals were born in 1988. The best of his offspring was probably the mare Kiss of Peace who four times at Grade 1 level in South Africa.

== Pedigree ==
Pedigree of Fordham (USA), bay stallion, 1975
Sire Forli (ARG) 1963	Aristophanes (GB); 1948	Hyperion	Gainsborough
Sire Forli (ARG) 1963	Aristophanes (GB); 1948	Hyperion	Selene
Sire Forli (ARG) 1963	Aristophanes (GB); 1948	Commotion	Mieuxce
Sire Forli (ARG) 1963	Aristophanes (GB); 1948	Commotion	Riot
Sire Forli (ARG) 1963	Trevisa (ARG); 1951	Advocate	Fair Trial
Sire Forli (ARG) 1963	Trevisa (ARG); 1951	Advocate	Guiding Star
Sire Forli (ARG) 1963	Trevisa (ARG); 1951	Veneta	Foxglove
Sire Forli (ARG) 1963	Trevisa (ARG); 1951	Veneta	Dogaresa
Dam Bold Enchantress (USA) 1970	Bold Ruler (USA); 1954	Nasrullah	Nearco
Dam Bold Enchantress (USA) 1970	Bold Ruler (USA); 1954	Nasrullah	Mumtaz Begum
Dam Bold Enchantress (USA) 1970	Bold Ruler (USA); 1954	Miss Disco	Discovery
Dam Bold Enchantress (USA) 1970	Bold Ruler (USA); 1954	Miss Disco	Outdone
Dam Bold Enchantress (USA) 1970	Princessnesian (USA); 1964	Princequillo	Prince Rose
Dam Bold Enchantress (USA) 1970	Princessnesian (USA); 1964	Princequillo	Cosquilla
Dam Bold Enchantress (USA) 1970	Princessnesian (USA); 1964	Alanesian	Polynesian
Dam Bold Enchantress (USA) 1970	Princessnesian (USA); 1964	Alanesian	Alablue (Family:4-m)
