= American Stakes =

- Class: Grade III
- Location: Santa Anita Park; Arcadia, California, USA
- Inaugurated: 1938 (as American Handicap at Hollywood Park Racetrack)
- Race type: Thoroughbred - Flat racing
- Website: Santa Anita Park

Race information
- Distance: 1 mile
- Surface: Turf
- Track: Left-handed
- Qualification: Three-year-olds & older
- Weight: Base weights with allowances: 4-year-olds and up: 124 lbs.
- Purse: $100,000 (since 2014)

The American Stakes is a Grade III American thoroughbred horse race for horses age four and older over a distance of one mile on the turf track held at Santa Anita Park in Arcadia, California in April. The race currently offers a purse of $100,000.

== History ==
The event was inaugurated on Independence Day in 1938 as the American Handicap, when Bing Crosby's and Lindsay C. Howard's Argentine bred Ligorati set a new track record of 1:50 for the 1 1/8 miles feature on the dirt track before a crowd of 60,000 at Hollywood Park Racetrack. The event was regularly scheduled for many of its runnings on the Fourth of July holiday attracting massive crowds especially in the 1950s and 1960s.

In its early runnings, the event became a main preparatory event for the Hollywood Gold Cup. The event attracted many fine horses who went on to complete the double. These include Argentine bred Kayak II in 1939, the Irish bred Champion Noor in 1950, the 1948 Triple Crown champion Citation in 1951, Irish bred Royal Serenade in 1953, 1953 Kentucky Derby winner Swaps in 1956, Hillsdale in 1959, Prove It in 1962, South African bred Colorado King in 1964, Native Diver in 1965. In 1968 the event was moved to the turf track. The Argentine bred Figonero in 1969 and in 1971 US Horse of the Year Ack Ack were able to complete the American Handicap–Hollywood Gold Cup double.

The race was not run in 1942 or 1943, due to Hollywood Park being closed. In 1949, the event was held at Santa Anita Park, due to a devastating fire at Hollywood Park on the night of May 5, 1949.

The South African import Colorado King equalled the then-current world record for 1 1/8 miles in winning the 1964 edition.

Two mares have won this event, Pink Pigeon in 1968 and Toussaud in 1993.

The event was run in divisions in 1969 and 1975.

The event was a Grade II from 1973 to 1987, gaining Grade I status for 1988 and 1989. The event was downgraded to Grade III in 2014.

In 2011, the distance was shortened to one mile from nine furlongs.

On the closing of Hollywood Park Racetrack in 2013 the event has been held at Santa Anita Park.

== Records ==
Speed record:

- 1 mile: 1:32:08 – Johannes (2024)
- 1 1/8 miles: 1:45.60 – Clever Song (1987)

Margins:

- 7 lengths - Pink Pigeon (1968)

Most wins by a jockey:

- 8 - Bill Shoemaker (1954, 1963, 1970, 1971, 1972, 1976, 1980, 1981)

Most wins by a trainer:

- 7 - Charles Whittingham (1967, 1970, 1971, 1972, 1976, 1980, 1981)

Most wins by an owner:

- 3 - Charles S. Howard (1939, 1941, 1950)
- 3 - Rex C. Ellsworth (1956, 1962, 1963)

== Winners ==
Year	Winner	Age	Jockey	Trainer	Owner	Distance	Time	Purse	Grade	Ref
At Santa Anita Park – American Stakes
2026	Almendares (GB)	6	Antonio Fresu	Philip D'Amato	CYBT, McLean Racing Stables, Saul Gevertz, Michael Nentwig & Ray Pagano	1 mile	1:34.14	$101,000	III	
2025	Cabo Spirit	6	Mike E. Smith	George Papaprodromou	Kretz Racing	1 mile	1:34.42	$101,000	III	
2024	Johannes	4	Umberto Rispoli	Tim Yakteen	Cuyathy	1 mile	1:32:08	$102,500	III	
2023	Exaulted	6	Juan Hernandez	Peter Eurton	C R K Stable	1 mile	1:33.65	$100,500	III	
2022	Hong Kong Harry (IRE)	5	Ramon A. Vazquez	Philip D'Amato	Scott Anastasi, Jimmy Ukegawa & Tony Valazza	1 mile	1:33.87	$102,500	III	
2021	Restrainedvengence	6	Tyler Baze	Val Brinkerhoff	Kelly Brinkerhoff & Bob Grayson Jr.	1 mile	1:33.87	$100,500	III	
2020	Blitzkrieg	4	Victor Espinoza	Doug F. O'Neill	R3 Racing & Calara Farm	1 mile	1:33.46	$102,000	III	
2019	Majestic Eagle	4	Rafael Bejarano	Neil D. Drysdale	John Lindley & Ray Morton	1 mile	1:34.57	$100,351	III	
2018	What a View	7	Stewart Elliott	Kenneth D. Black	Finish Line Racing, The Elwood Johnston Trust & Taste of Victory Stables	1 mile	1:33.80	$100,690	III	
2017	Pee Wee Reese	4	Joseph Talamo	Philip D'Amato	Nicholas B. Alexander	1 mile	1:32.26	$101,035	III	
2016	Home Run Kitten	5	Joseph Talamo	David E. Hofmans	Kenneth & Sarah Ramsey	1 mile	1:35.30	$100,345	III	
2015	Bal a Bali (BRZ)	4	Flavien Prat	Richard E. Mandella	Fox Hill Farms & Sienna Farms	1 mile	1:35.69	$100,750	III	
2014	Obviously (IRE)	6	Joseph Talamo	Philip D'Amato	Anthony Fanticola & Joseph Scardino	1 mile	1:33.39	$98,000	III	
At Hollywood Park – American Handicap
2013	Obviously (IRE)	5	Joseph Talamo	Mike R. Mitchell	Anthony Fanticola & Joseph Scardino	1 mile	1:32.95	$150,250	II	
2012	Wilkinson	4	Martin A. Pedroza	Jeff Mullins	Edward K. Gaylord II	1 mile	1:33.37	$150,000	II	
2011	Ryehill Dreamer (IRE)	5	Joseph Talamo	Julio C. Canani	Marsha Naify	1 mile	1:33.55	$150,000	II	
2010	Global Hunter (ARG)	7	Brice Blanc	A. C. Avila	L-Bo Racing & Monte Pyle	1 1/8 miles	1:48.00	$150,000	II	
2009	Monterey Jazz	5	Tyler Baze	Craig Dollase	A&R Stables & Class Racing Stable	1 1/8 miles	1:46.11	$150,000	II	
2008	Whatsthescript (IRE)	4	Isaias D. Enriquez	John W. Sadler	Tommy Town Thoroughbreds	1 1/8 miles	1:46.34	$250,000	II	
American Invitational Handicap
2007	Out of Control (BRZ)	4	Michael Baze	Robert J. Frankel	Stud TNT	1 1/8 miles	1:46.89	$250,000	II	
2006	The Tin Man	8	Victor Espinoza	Richard E. Mandella	Aury & Ralph E. Todd	1 1/8 miles	1:46.24	$250,000	II	
2005	Whilly (IRE)	4	Felipe F. Martinez	Doug F. O'Neill	Triple B Farms	1 1/8 miles	1:46.30	$250,000	II	
American Handicap
2004	Bayamo (IRE)	5	David R. Flores	Julio C. Canani	Prestonwood Farm	1 1/8 miles	1:46.60	$150,000	II	
2003	Candy Ride (ARG)	4	Gary L. Stevens	Ron McAnally	Sidney & Jenny Craig	1 1/8 miles	1:46.20	$150,000	II	
2002	The Tin Man	4	Mike E. Smith	Richard E. Mandella	Aury & Ralph E. Todd	1 1/8 miles	1:46.82	$150,000	II	
2001	Takarian (IRE)	6	Garrett K. Gomez	C. Beau Greely	Columbine Stable, John Greely III & Tom Nichols	1 1/8 miles	1:48.19	$150,000	II	
2000	Dark Moondancer (GB)	5	Chris McCarron	Ron McAnally	Charles Cella	1 1/8 miles	1:46.74	$150,000	II	
1999	Takarian (IRE)	4	Garrett K. Gomez	C. Beau Greely	Columbine Stable, John Greely III & Tom Nichols	1 1/8 miles	1:47.37	$150,000	II	
1998	Magellan	5	Gary L. Stevens	Ben D. A. Cecil	Gary A. Tanaka	1 1/8 miles	1:47.05	$150,000	II	
1997	El Angelo	5	Alex O. Solis	Jenine Sahadi	Evergreen Farms	1 1/8 miles	1:46.99	$160,600	II	
1996	Labeeb (GB)	4	Eddie Delahoussaye	Neil D. Drysdale	Maktoum bin Rashid Al Maktoum	abt. 1 1/8 miles	1:45.78	$110,200	II	
1995	Silver Wizard	5	Gary L. Stevens	Neil D. Drysdale	Shirley Robins	abt. 1 1/8 miles	1:46.02	$159,400	II	
1994	Blues Traveller (IRE)	4	Chris Antley	Rodney Rash	Gary A. Tanaka	1 1/8 miles	1:46.50	$218,000	II	
1993	† Toussaud	4	Kent J. Desormeaux	Robert J. Frankel	Juddmonte Farm	1 1/8 miles	1:46.87	$200,000	II	
1992	Man From Eldorado	4	Kent J. Desormeaux	Neil D. Drysdale	Peter D. Savill	1 1/8 miles	1:47.11	$212,000	II	
1991	Tight Spot	4	Laffit Pincay Jr.	Ron McAnally	Corradini, VHW Stables & Whitham, et al	1 1/8 miles	1:46.00	$219,400	II	
1990	Classic Fame	4	Eddie Delahoussaye	Gary F. Jones	Classic Thoroughbreds & Prestonwood Farm	1 1/8 miles	1:47.80	$216,800	II	
1989	Mister Wonderful (GB)	6	Fernando Toro	Richard E. Mandella	Steve M. Taub	1 1/8 miles	1:47.20	$318,600	I	
1988	Skip Out Front	6	Chris McCarron	Michael S. Harmatuck	Ann Gaffey	1 1/8 miles	1:46.40	$205,800	I	
1987	Clever Song	5	Laffit Pincay Jr.	John Gosden	MBH Stables	1 1/8 miles	1:45.60	$217,800	II	
1986	Al Mamoon	5	Pat Valenzuela	Robert J. Frankel	Edmund A. Gann & Bertram R. Firestone	1 1/16 miles	1:39.20	$161,000	II	
1985	Tsunami Slew	4	Gary L. Stevens	Edwin J. Gregson	Royal Lines (Lessee)	1 1/8 miles	1:46.20	$207,800	II	
1984	Bel Bolide	6	Terry Lipham	John Gosden	Stonechurch Stable	1 1/8 miles	1:46.80	$164,100	II	
1983	John Henry	8	Chris McCarron	Ron McAnally	Dotsam Stable	1 1/8 miles	1:48.40	$164,600	II	
1982	§ Spence Bay (IRE)	7	Fernando Toro	Randy Winick	Hunt & Summa Stable	1 1/8 miles	1:47.20	$167,800	II	
1981	Bold Tropic (SAF)	6	Bill Shoemaker	Charles E. Whittingham	Mr. & Mrs. Cyril Hurvitz	1 1/8 miles	1:46.80	$165,600	II	
1980	Bold Tropic (SAF)	5	Bill Shoemaker	Charles E. Whittingham	Mr. & Mrs. Cyril Hurvitz	1 1/8 miles	1:46.40	$110,700	II	
1979	Smoggy (GB)	5	Darrel McHargue	Don Combs	Double Eagle Stable	1 1/8 miles	1:47.40	$110,500	II	
1978	Effervescing	5	Laffit Pincay Jr.	D. Wayne Lukas	Mel Hatley & Albert Yank	1 1/8 miles	1:47.20	$110,500	II	
1977	Hunza Dancer	5	Jean Cruguet	Arthur E. Breasley	Ravi Tikkoo	1 1/8 miles	1:47.20	$113,900	II	
1976	§ King Pellinore	4	Bill Shoemaker	Charles E. Whittingham	John Mulcahy	1 1/8 miles	1:48.00	$81,950	II	
1975	Pass the Glass	4	Fernando Toro	Thomas A. Pratt	Herman Sarkowsky	1 1/8 miles	1:48.20	$87,550	II	Division 1
1975	Montmartre	5	Fernando Toro	John Bucalo	William Breliant	1 1/8 miles	1:49.60	$85,550	II	Division 2
1974	Plunk	4	Laffit Pincay Jr.	Buster Millerick	Richard Craigo	1 1/8 miles	1:48.00	$86,650	II	
1973	Kentuckian	4	Rudy Campas	Paul K. Parker	Preston Madden	1 1/8 miles	1:48.00	$84,150	II	
1972	Buzkashi	4	Bill Shoemaker	Charles E. Whittingham	Marjorie L. Everett	1 1/8 miles	1:48.60	$83,300		
1971	Ack Ack	5	Bill Shoemaker	Charles E. Whittingham	Forked Lightning Ranch	1 1/8 miles	1:47.20	$79,850		
1970	§ Fiddle Isle	5	Bill Shoemaker	Charles E. Whittingham	Howard B. Keck	1 1/8 miles	1:47.60	$54,250		
1969	Figonero (ARG)	5	Laffit Pincay Jr.	Warren Stute	Clement L. Hirsch	1 1/8 miles	1:48.00	$55,750		Division 1
1969	Poleax	4	Donald Pierce	Wally Dunn	Fritz Hawn	1 1/8 miles	1:48.40	$54,250		Division 2
1968	† Pink Pigeon	4	William Harris	Paul K. Parker	Patrick Madden	1 1/8 miles	1:47.80	$56,800		
1967	Pretense	4	Johnny Sellers	Charles E. Whittingham	Llangollen Farm	1 1/8 miles	1:47.00	$54,700		
1966	Travel Orb	4	William Harmatz	Leonard Dorfman	Floyd Hughes & George Dimick	1 1/8 miles	1:47.80	$56,650		
1965	Native Diver	6	Jerry Lambert	Buster Millerick	Mr. & Mrs Louis K. Shapiro	1 1/8 miles	1:47.20	$53,750		
1964	Colorado King (SAF)	5	Ray York	Wally Dunn	Poltex Stable, Fritz Hawn, Keith Freeman & Roland Bond	1 1/8 miles	1:46.40	$55,200		
1963	Dr. Kacy	4	Bill Shoemaker	Rex C. Ellsworth	Rex C. Ellsworth	1 1/8 miles	1:48.20	$57,050		
1962	Prove It	5	Henry E. Moreno	Mesh Tenney	Rex C. Ellsworth	1 1/8 miles	1:47.60	$55,350		
1961	§ Prince Blessed	4	Johnny Longden	James I. Nazworthy	Kerr Stable	1 1/8 miles	1:47.60	$55,800		
1960	Prize Host	4	William Harmatz	William Simpson	Circle TWP Stable	1 1/8 miles	1:47.60	$54,200		
1959	Hillsdale	4	Tommy Barrow	Martin L. Fallon Jr.	Clarence Whitted Smith	1 1/8 miles	1:47.20	$53,650		
1958	How Now	5	William Harmatz	Cecil C. Jolly	George C. Newell	1 1/8 miles	1:47.80	$54,200		
1957	Find	7	Ralph Neves	William C. Winfrey	Alfred G. Vanderbilt	1 1/8 miles	1:47.00	$55,550		
1956	Swaps	4	Henry E. Moreno	Mesh Tenney	Rex C. Ellsworth	1 1/8 miles	1:46.80	$103,250		
1955	Alidon	4	Johnny Longden	William Molter	Louis B. Mayer	1 1/8 miles	1:46.80	$53,750		
1954	§ Rejected	4	Bill Shoemaker	William J. Hirsch	King Ranch	1 1/8 miles	1:48.00	$55,150		
1953	§ Royal Serenade (IRE)	5	Johnny Longden	Vance Longden	Alberta Ranches, Ltd.	1 1/8 miles	1:48.60	$56,550		
1952	§ Admiral Drake	4	Gordon Glisson	William F. Alvarado	Abraham Hirschberg	1 1/8 miles	1:48.20	$56,000		
1951	§ Citation	6	Steve Brooks	Horace A. Jones	Calumet Farm	1 1/8 miles	1:48.40	$56,250		
1950	Noor	5	Johnny Longden	Burley Parke	Charles S. Howard	1 1/4 miles	2:00.20	$56,250		
At Santa Anita Park
1949	Double Jay	5	Carroll Bierman	Walter C. McCue	James V. Tigani & James Boines	1 1/8 miles	1:48.60	$56,500		
At Hollywood Park
1948	§ Stepfather	4	Gene Pederson	Wayne B. Stucki	W. L. Ranch	1 1/8 miles	1:50.40	$55,500		
1947	Burning Dream	5	Johnny Longden	William Molter	Muriel Vanderbilt Adams	1 1/8 miles	1:48.20	$56,850		
1946	Quick Reward	4	Anthony Skoronski	Elwood L. Fitzgerald	Norman W. Church	1 1/16 miles	1:43.20	$57,250		
1945	§ Bull Reigh	7	Hubert Trent	Hack Ross	Carlotta D. Jelm	1 1/16 miles	1:43.40	$60,100		
1944	Paperboy	4	George Woolf	Jimmy Coleman	W. L. Ranch	1 1/8 miles	1:49.60	$27,850		
1942–1943		Race not held								
1941	Mioland	4	Leon Haas	Tom Smith	Charles S. Howard	1 1/8 miles	1:49.40	$22,750		
1940	Viscounty	4	Nunzio Pariso	Frank Catrone	Valdana Farms	1 1/8 miles	1:47.60	$15,950		
1939	Kayak II (ARG)	4	George Woolf	Tom Smith	Charles S. Howard	1 1/8 miles	1:49.80	$15,800		
1938	Ligaroti (ARG)	6	Noel Richardson	Lindsay C. Howard	Binglin Stable	1 1/8 miles	1:50.00	$8,750		

Legend:
Turf Dirt
Notes:
† Filly or Mare
§ Ran as part of an entry

== See also ==
- List of American and Canadian Graded races
