= The Tin Man (American horse) =

American Thoroughbred racehorse

- Sire: Affirmed
- Grandsire: Exclusive Native
- Dam: Lizzie Rolfe
- Damsire: Tom Rolfe
- Sex: Gelding
- Foaled: 1998
- Country: USA
- Colour: Brown
- Breeder: Ralph and Aury Todd
- Owner: The Todds
- Trainer: Richard Mandella
- Record: 30:13-7-2
- Earnings: $3,613,780.

Major wins
- Clement L. Hirsch Memorial Turf Championship Stakes (2002, 2006); American Handicap (2002); San Luis Obispo Handicap (2003); Arlington Million (2006); American Handicap (2006); San Marcos Stakes (2006); Shoemaker Mile (2007)
- Last updated on August 13, 2007

The Tin Man (February 18, 1998 in Kentucky – 2015) was an American thoroughbred racehorse. The gelding was sired by Affirmed, the Triple Crown of Thoroughbred Racing winner, out of the unplaced Lizzie Rolfe by Tom Rolfe, who was an exceptional racehorse but a better broodmare sire.

The Tin Man was retired at the age of 9 due to complications following exploratory surgery on an ankle.

== Breeding ==
A dark brown gelding, The Tin Man was bred and raced by Ralph and Aury Todd (who live in California's Santa Ynez Valley). His sire never ran on grass, but his descendants proved themselves on the turf. Affirmed's daughter, Flawlessly, twice earned Eclipse Awards as Champion Grass Female and was inducted into the Hall of Fame. One of his top sons, Charlie Barley, was a Canadian Turf Champion.

The Todds bought a mare called Dancin' Liz by Northern Dancer. She became a stakes winner and a stakes producer, with foals including the Grade II winner Oraibi by Forli. She also dropped a Skywalker foal: the stakes-placed gelding Santero. Her filly by Tom Rolfe is The Tin Man's dam.

The Tin Man was Lizzie Rolfe's ninth live foal. She died in 2000 giving birth to a full sister to The Tin Man called She's a Rich Girl.

== Early career ==
As a two-year-old, The Tin Man bowed both tendons, injuries that required surgical repair. This early injury sidelined him for a lengthy period. "He had some injuries that would've stopped some horses along the way," said trainer Richard Mandella. "His body must have a great ability to overcome them." Mandella also decided to geld him. "I thought it might be a good idea to geld him for two reasons. First, it keeps them from developing that heavy chest, heavy neck, and that's 60 or 75 pounds of weight up front that you keep off. The second part was that he might behave himself better and have less chance to injure himself than a colt would."

As a 4-year-old, The Tin Man won the Grade I Clement L. Hirsch Memorial Turf Championship Stakes and the Grade II American Handicap. He placed in the Grade II Del Mar Handicap and came in third in the Grade III San Francisco Breeders' Cup. As a 5-year-old, he won the Grade II San Luis Obispo Handicap and placed in the Grade I United Nations Handicap.

== Later career ==
Due to an ankle injury suffered in the Hirsch, thereby incurring major soft-tissue damage, The Tin Man was away from the races for fifteen months. He spent that time at River Edge Farm near Buellton, California, where the Todds board their mares. The owners often went to see him. "He's a dandy," says Ralph Todd, "...we'd go to visit, and as soon as he saw us, he'd come right over." Mandella said, "When we started him back, he just got better and better."

He won at Santa Anita Park in December 2005 in an allowance race in his first race back.

In January 2006, he took the Grade IIT San Marcos Handicap. A runner up in the Grade I Dubai Duty Free Stakes in the United Arab Emirates, he then, ridden by Victor Espinoza, wired the Grade I Arlington Million on turf and won the Grade II American Handicap.

After the Arlington Million, Mandella said he'd consider the 2006 running of the Breeders' Cup Turf. (The Tin Man had twice run fourth in the BC Turf.) Mandella's win in the Arlington was his seventh attempt. "I've been trying to win this race for a long time, and it's nice to finally win it," said Mandella. "The Tin Man has been around for a long time. He's a pretty cool guy."

With his second win in the September 30, 2006, Clement L. Hirsch Memorial Turf Championship Stakes, The Tin Man reached $3,126,860 in earnings. He also beat John Henry's record as the oldest horse to win the Hirsch (known, in John's day, as the Oak Tree Turf).

Richard Mandella opted to keep The Tin Man out of the Breeders' Cup Turf in 2006, saying he would start him in the Citation Handicap for the first time. But after some disappointing workouts, Mandella gave his horse the rest of the year off.

In 2006, The Tin Man was under consideration for Eclipse honors.

== 2007 season ==
In early February 2007, The Tin Man re-entered training. He won the Grade I Shoemaker Mile, Hollywood's Memorial Day feature, defeating Kip Deville for his fourth straight win. Sweeping wide from a position just off the pace entering the stretch, The Tin Man rallied and drew clear. With this win, he became the first horse in North America to win a Grade I stakes race at 9 since John's Call won two such races in 2000.

"It's just phenomenal that he's stayed so good after all these years," said Mandella after the victory.

On June 30, The Tin Man finished second in the American Invitational Handicap, losing by a head to the Brazilian colt Out of Control. The Tin Man carried 10 more pounds, and Mandella said a key workout leading into the race had not gone well. "There was a loose horse on the track, and he didn't get much out of a work that he really needed."

The Tin Man was the defending champion when he returned to the Arlington Million on August 11, 2007. No other horse in the 25 yr old signature race at Arlington Park had ever won it back to back years, and only John Henry had won it at age 9. Going off as the betting favorite, he took the lead after the last turn, on the softer turf ground, but was overtaken by the Canadian gelding Jambalaya, losing by 3/4 of a length in a time of 2:04:76, paying $3.80 and $2.60, and elevating his career earnings to $3,613,780.

His final start of 2007 - and final start of his career - took place in the Grade 1 Oak Tree $250k Clement L. Hirsch Turf Championship Stakes held at Santa Anita October 6 at 1 1/4 miles. As the 3-5 favorite, he lost by one length to six-year-old Artiste Royal, who had previously been 0 for 9 in starts in the US.

The Tin Man's 2007 record was 4 starts 1-3-0 with the victory being a Grade 1 and his second-place finishes being 2 Grade 1s and 1 Grade 2.

== Surgery and retirement ==
The Tin Man emerged from his final race on October 6 with body soreness. Despite his age, Mandella hoped that the horse could return in 2008 and race as a 10-year-old. He was taken out of training and his owners sent him in for exploratory tests. Among the test findings were suggestions of possible damage to an ankle, which resulted in an exploratory arthroscopic procedure.

On October 25, 2007, The Tin Man underwent the procedure without issue. However, when coming out of anesthesia, he spooked and fractured his knee. The injury was serious enough for the owners and trainer to retire The Tin Man. They made the announcement on October 31, 2007.

On April 14, 2008, The Tin Man arrived at Martin and Pam Wygod's River Edge Farm near Buellton, California. His movements are a bit constricted due to calcium deposits on his knee, but solutions were sought. "He's had trouble with that knee...it has definitely cramped his lifestyle a little bit, but he gets around fairly well," said Russell Drake, River Edge farm manager. "Right now, I've got him out in a big, grass paddock, and his main thing is to just eat and be happy for a while. He's just one of those upbeat little guys that loves to eat grass, be in the sun, and have a good time."

The Tin Man died in April 2015.
