= Alphabet Soup (horse) =

American Thoroughbred racehorse

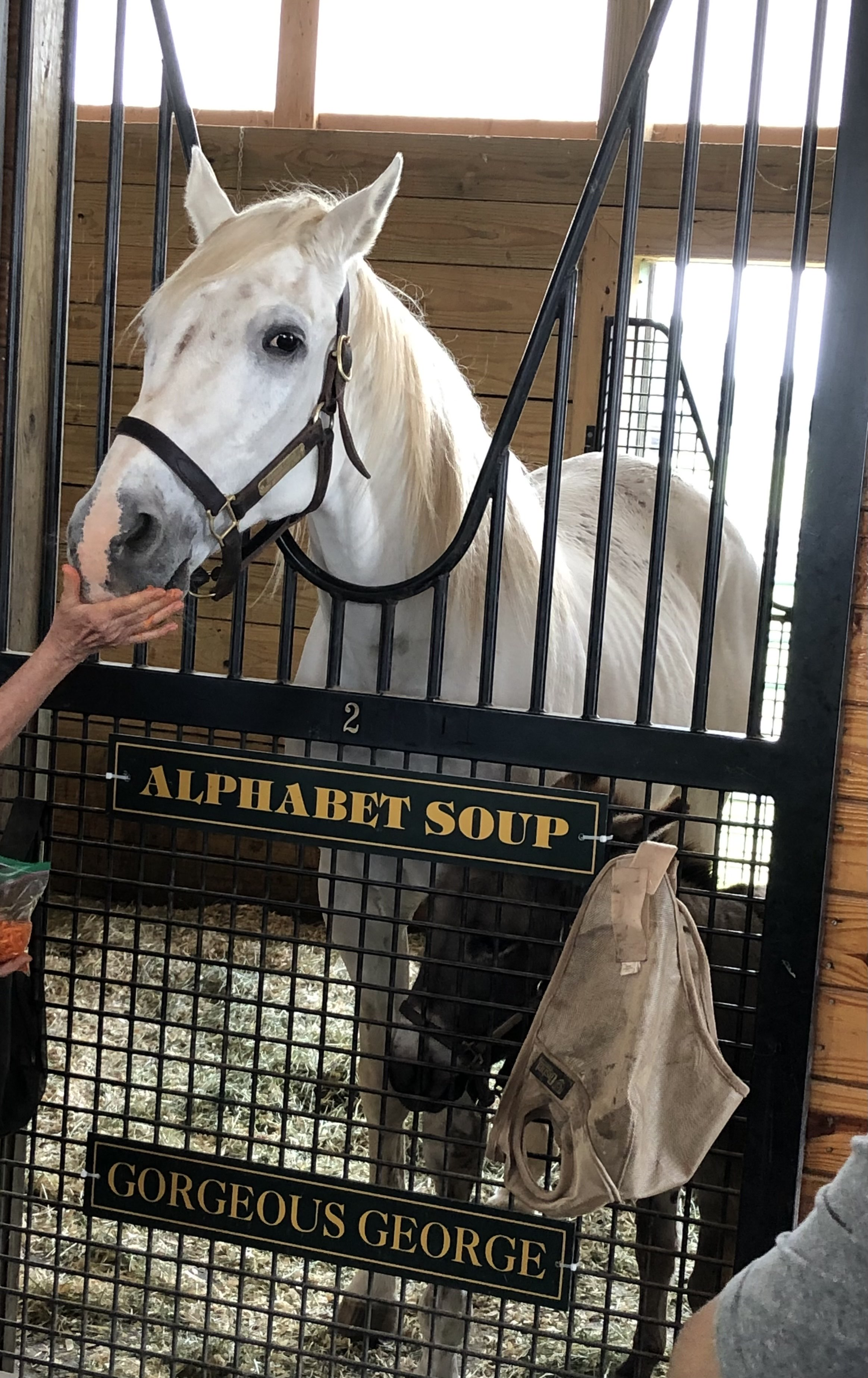
- Alphabet Soup At Old Friends (2019) alongside Gorgeous George
- Sire: Cozzene
- Grandsire: Caro
- Dam: Illiterate
- Damsire: Arts and Letters
- Sex: Stallion
- Foaled: March 31, 1991
- Died: January 28, 2022 (aged 30)
- Country: United States
- Colour: Gray
- Breeder: Southeast Associates
- Owner: Ridder Thoroughbred Stable
- Trainer: David Hofmans
- Record: 24: 10-3-6
- Earnings: $2,990,270

Major wins
- Del Mar Breeders' Cup Handicap (1995); Native Diver Handicap (1995); San Pasqual Handicap (1996); Pat O'Brien Handicap (1996); San Antonio Handicap (1996); Breeders' Cup wins: Breeders' Cup Classic (1996)
- Last updated on June 11, 2014

Alphabet Soup (March 31, 1991 – January 28, 2022) was an American Thoroughbred racehorse best known for setting a track record for 1¼ miles at Woodbine Racetrack when he won the 1996 Breeders' Cup Classic, defeating both the great Cigar and Preakness Stakes winner Louis Quatorze. Upon the death of A.P. Indy on February 21, 2020, Alphabet Soup became the oldest living winner of the Breeders' Cup Classic.

He was bred by Southeast Associates, a group led by Roy S. Lerman, and purchased by Californian Georgia B. Ridder. He was a descendant of Nearco, and his damsire was U.S. Racing Hall of Fame inductee Arts and Letters. Purchased privately as a two-year-old by Georgia B. Ridder, Alphabet Soup was late in developing. Mrs. Ridder raced the colt in California, where he began to come into his own at the age of four, winning the 1995 Native Diver and Del Mar Breeders' Cup Handicaps. In 1996, en route to his triumph in that year's Breeders' Cup Classic, he won three important graded stakes races: the San Antonio Handicap, the Pat O'Brien Handicap, and the San Pasqual Handicap, in which he defeated Best Pal. He also crossed the wire first in the Goodwood Breeders' Cup Handicap but was disqualified and set back to third.

Alphabet Soup raced in 1997 at age six, his best effort coming in defense of the San Antonio Handicap when he finished second to Gentlemen.

He was euthanized due to chronic kidney disease, at Old Friends Thoroughbred Retirement in Georgetown, Kentucky, on January 28, 2022, at the age of 30.

== Stud career ==
Alphabet Soup retired to stud duty, he stood at Adena Springs in Midway, Kentucky.

Alphabet Soup descendants include:

c = colt, f = filly

Foaled	Name	Sex	Major Wins
1999	Our New Recruit	c	Dubai Golden Shaheen
1999	M B Sea	c	Fayette Stakes, West Virginia Governor's Stakes
1999	Phantom Light	c	Dominion Day Stakes
2000	Beautiful Bets	c	Kentucky Cup Distaff Stakes
2000	Ladyecho	c	Dearly Precious Stakes
2001	Alphabet Kisses	c	La Brea Stakes, A Gleam Handicap
2002	Silver Whistle	c	Pan American Stakes
2006	Sal the Barber	c	Calder Derby
2009	Egg Drop	c	Matriarch Stakes, Las Palmas Handicap, Yellow Ribbon Handicap
