= Asidero =

Argentine Thoroughbred racehorse

- Sire: Fadeyev
- Grandsire: Nureyev
- Dam: Lady Aspasia
- Damsire: Tunerup
- Sex: Stallion
- Foaled: July 28, 1996
- Country: Argentina
- Colour: Bay
- Breeder: Haras de la Pomme
- Owner: Haras de la Pomme
- Record: 16: 7-3-1
- Earnings: Arg$470,420 (US$617,969)

Major wins
- Gran Premio Gran Criterium (1999); Gran Premio Dos Mil Guineas (1999); Polla de Potrillos (1999); Gran Premio Jockey Club (1999); Gran Premio Carlos Pellegrini (1999)

Awards
- Argentine Horse of the Year (1999); Argentine Champion Three-Year-Old Male (1999); Argentine Champion Stayer (1999); Leading sire in Uruguay (2009-2010, 2012)

Asidero is an Argentine thoroughbred racehorse best known for his 1999 campaign, during which he won five consecutive Group 1 races and was named the Argentine Horse of the Year, Champion Three-Year-Old Male, and Champion Stayer.

== Background ==
Asidero was bred by Haras de la Pomme.

Fadeyev, Asidero's sire, was an American-bred horse who raced in France and the United States, winning the Group 3 Prix Thomas Bryon and Group 3 Prix de Fontainebleau. At the conclusion of his racing career in 1995, he was exported to Argentina for breeding, standing stud at Haras de la Pomme. Fadeyev had limited success as a sire, siring only 3 stakes winners, including Asidero, who was by far his best runner.

Lady Aspasia, Asidero's dam, was imported from the United States, where she was bred, as a two-year-old, and raced six times, winning three. She was graded stakes placed, finishing third in the Group 2 Clásico Gilberto Lerena. Asidero was her fourth foal, after the winners Honor Guard, Entrometida, and Love For Life. Aside from Asidero, Love For Life was Lady Aspasia's most successful foal on the racetrack, winning multiple graded stakes races in 1997 and 1998.

Asidero is a solid bay horse.

== Racing career ==
=== 1999 ===
Asidero first raced as a two-year-old in 1999, finishing second twice before breaking his maiden in a 1400-meter maiden race at Hipódromo de San Isidro by 16 lengths.

His first stakes race was the Group 1 Gran Criterium at San Isidro, run over 1600 meters, which he won. It was also his last race as two-year-old, as he didn't race again until August.

As a three-year-old, Asidero ran in the Group 1 Gran Premio Dos Mil Guineas, conducted over the same distance as the Gran Criterium. He won by two and a half lengths.

In Asidero's next race, the Group 1 Gran Premio Polla de Potrillos, he left San Isidro for the first time to race at Hipódromo Argentino de Palermo. The change in venue proved no challenge as he galloped away to win by six lengths.

In the 2000-meter Gran Premio Jockey Club, Asidero's first start longer than 1600 meters, he was twice impeded early on by Cafetín, but after that faced no difficulties, easily winning by four lengths. He returned to the stands to the long, unanimous applause of the crowd.

After the Gran Premio Jockey Club, Asidero's connections decided to skip the Gran Premio Nacional–and a chance at winning the national Argentine Triple Crown–in favor of resting him up for the Gran Premio Carlos Pellegrini, Argentina's premier race.

The 1999 Gran Premio Carlos Pellegrini was anticipated to be the race of the decade, with over 76,800 people in attendance. The field contained 11 Group 1 winners, including Asidero, Litigado (G1 Gran Premio Nacional), Crystal House (G1 Clásico Nacional Ricardo Lyon, G1 Clásico El Ensayo), Refinado Tom (Argentine Triple Crown winner, G1 Carreras de las Estrellas Juvenile, G1 Carreras de las Estrellas Classic, etc.), Ixal (G1 Gran Premio Joaquín S. de Anchorena, G1 Copa de Oro, G1 Gran Premio 25 de Mayo), and Coalsack (G1 Gran Premio Carlos Pellegrini).

Coming from the one post, Asidero broke well and ran for the lead. To his outside, Litigado also broke well, and ended up outrunning Asidero for the front position. Asidero settled just behind and to the inside of Litigado, pushing the pace for the first 700 meters of the 2400-meter race before Litigado opened up some space, leading by a couple of lengths into the turn. As the horses rounded the single turn, Asidero and the rest of the field crept up on Litigado, with Cardenas guiding Asidero to his outside. Asidero drew even with Litigado as they straightened onto the homestretch, and it looked to be a two horse race as the pair started to draw away from the field. With 400 meters left, Crystal House made her way out of the pack and took aim at the two leaders. With just under 200 meters left, Asidero nosed ahead of Litigado with Crystal House two lengths behind them and a gap of several lengths more to the rest of the field. Asidero veered outward, losing his place against Litigado, with Crystal House on the inside drawing up alongside them. Cardenas straightened Asidero out again, and the bay ran down Litigado and Crystal House to win by a head over Litigado, with Crystal House only half a head behind that.

The final time for the race was 2:21.98, lowering Seaborg's mark of 2:22.15 set for the race and track four years prior. As of 2024, the time still stands as the Argentine record for 2400 meters on the turf.

Winning the Gran Premio Carlos Pellegrini made Asidero the second winner of the San Isidro Colt Triple Crown, after Chullo.

=== 2000 ===
As a Breeders' Cup Challenge race, Asidero's victory in the Gran Premio Carlos Pellegrini earned him a free berth in the Breeders' Cup Turf, and his connections decided to take advantage of that, having him shipped to the United States for his 2000 campaign.

During the year 2000, Asidero was trained by Ron McAnally, a Hall of Fame trainer who had trained other Argentinian imports such as Candy Ride, Bayakoa, and Paseana.

Asidero's first race in the United States was an allowance optional claiming race at Hollywood Park. He ran near the lead for most of the race before kicking clear in the stretch to win by one and a half lengths.

The Grade 1 Arlington Million was Asidero's first American stakes race, and he started well, quickly opening up a multiple length lead while being ridden in hand. In the stretch, he tired and gave way, finishing fifth. Asidero was then sent out west to California to contest Santa Anita's Grade 1 Clement L. Hirsch Memorial Turf Championship Stakes. He again set the early pace, but this time managed to avoid tiring as badly, finishing third.

Asidero then returned to Hollywood Park for the Grade 2 Citation Handicap. He took the early lead, being pressed by Devine Wind. About halfway through the turn, Asidero became uncomfortable and started to drift out, creating an opening that winning jockey Jose Santos took advantage of. Asidero ended up finishing eighth of ten and was put away for the year.

=== 2001 ===
In 2001, Asidero began training under a new trainer, Christophe Clement. Asidero opened up the year with the Grade 3 Red Bank Handicap. He ran near the lead and remained a factor in the stretch, but tired badly to finish last.

After that, Asidero was stepped down a level and ran in two allowance races. He raced under different tactics, hanging back early before closing in the homestretch. He finished second and fourth in the two races.

=== 2002 ===
In early 2002, Asidero returned to Argentina. The plan was to race rather than send him to stud, although the final decision would depend on how Asidero trained. Ideally, Asidero was to run in the Carreras de las Estrellas Classic.

Back under his original Argentinian trainer Juan C. Etchechoury, Asidero ran in the Group 3 Clásico República Federativa de Brasil in June, but failed to show his old form, finishing sixth. It would be his last race.

== Race record ==
Date	Age	Distance	Surface	Race	Grade	Track	Odds	Field	Finish	Time	Winning (Losing) margin	Jockey	Ref
Feb 24, 1999	2	1200 meters	Turf	New Robertina 1992	Maiden	Hipódromo de San Isidro	2.15*†	13	2	1:09.14	(1/2 length)	Cardenas E. Talaverano	
Mar 24, 1999	2	1400 meters	Turf	Pasarela 1931	Maiden	Hipódromo de San Isidro	1.75*	15	2	1:23.46	(1 1/2 lengths)	Cardenas E. Talaverano	
Apr 21, 1999	2	1400 meters	Turf	Solekee 1991	Maiden	Hipódromo de San Isidro	1.35*	8	1	1:22.11	16 lengths	Cardenas E. Talaverano	
May 6, 1999	2	1600 meters	Turf	Gran Critierium	I	Hipódromo de San Isidro	2.90*	18	1	1:32.59	3 1/2 lengths	Cardenas E. Talaverano	
Aug 7, 1999	3	1600 meters	Turf	Gran Premio Dos Mil Guineas	I	Hipódromo de San Isidro	1.65*	13	1	1:35.19	2 1/2 lengths	Cardenas E. Talaverano	
Sep 11, 1999	3	1600 meters	Dirt	Gran Premio Polla de Potrillos	I	Hipódromo Argentino de Palermo	2.00*	11	1	1:35.29	6 lengths	Cardenas E. Talaverano	
Oct 16, 1999	3	2000 meters	Turf	Gran Premio Jockey Club	I	Hipódromo de San Isidro	1.90*	15	1	1:58.64	4 lengths	Cardenas E. Talaverano	
Dec 12, 1999	3	2400 meters	Turf	Gran Premio Carlos Pellegrini	I	Hipódromo de San Isidro	2.55*	18	1	2:21.98	Head	Cardenas E. Talaverano	
Jul 3, 2000	4	1 mile	Turf	AOC	AOC	Hollywood Park	1.10*	5	1	1:34.07	2 1/2 lengths	Alex Solis	
Aug 19, 2000	4	1 1/4 miles	Turf	Arlington Million	I	Arlington Park	3.60	7	5	2:01.37	(6 lengths)	Alex Solis	
Oct 8, 2000	4	1 1/4 miles	Turf	Clement L. Hirsch Memorial Turf Championship Stakes	I	Santa Anita	1.10*	6	3	2:00.67	(2 1/2 lengths)	Alex Solis	
Nov 25, 2000	4	1 1/16 miles	Turf	Citation Handicap	II	Hollywood Park	5.00	10	8	1:40.30	(6 1/4 lengths)	Alex Solis	
May 28, 2001	4	1 mile	Turf	Red Bank Handicap	III	Monmouth Park	2.90	10	10	1:36.38	(6 1/2 lengths)	Jean-Luc Samyn	
Jun 29, 2001	4	1 1/16 miles	Turf	Allowance	Allowance	Belmont Park	1.65*	6	2	1:41.30	(1/2 length)	Jean-Luc Samyn	
Jul 25, 2001	5	1 mile	Turf	Allowance	Allowance	Saratoga	5.00	9	4	1:35.24	(3 1/2 lengths)	Jean-Luc Samyn	
Jul 26, 2002	6	1600 meters	Turf	Clásico República Federativa del Brasil	III	Hipódromo Argentino de Palermo	4.70	7	6	1:33.43	(13 1/2 lengths)	Jorge Valdivieso	

== Stud career ==
In 2003, Asidero was exported to Uruguay to stand stud at Haras Don Alfredo.

As of 2020, Asidero is the sire of 25 stakes winners (5.2%). He led the Uruguayan general sire list in 2009, 2010, and 2012.

=== Notable progeny ===
c = colt, f = filly, g = gelding

Foaled	Name	Sex	Major Wins
2008	Rosa Colonial	f	Gran Premio Ciudad de Montevideo

== Pedigree ==
Pedigree of Asidero (ARG), bay stallion, foaled July 28, 1996
Sire Fadeyev (USA) 1991	Nureyev (USA); 1977	Northern Dancer (CAN)	Nearctic (CAN)
Sire Fadeyev (USA) 1991	Nureyev (USA); 1977	Northern Dancer (CAN)	Natalma (USA)
Sire Fadeyev (USA) 1991	Nureyev (USA); 1977	Special (USA)	Forli (ARG)
Sire Fadeyev (USA) 1991	Nureyev (USA); 1977	Special (USA)	Thong (USA)
Sire Fadeyev (USA) 1991	Skating (IRE); 1985	Mill Reef (USA)	Never Bend (USA)
Sire Fadeyev (USA) 1991	Skating (IRE); 1985	Mill Reef (USA)	Milan Mill (USA)
Sire Fadeyev (USA) 1991	Skating (IRE); 1985	Running Ballerina (GB)	Nijinsky (CAN)
Sire Fadeyev (USA) 1991	Skating (IRE); 1985	Running Ballerina (GB)	Running Blue (GB)
Dam Lady Aspasia (USA) 1985	Tunerup (USA); 1976	The Pruner (USA)	Herbager (FR)
Dam Lady Aspasia (USA) 1985	Tunerup (USA); 1976	The Pruner (USA)	Punctilious (USA)
Dam Lady Aspasia (USA) 1985	Tunerup (USA); 1976	Our Girl (USA)	Rocky Royale (GB)
Dam Lady Aspasia (USA) 1985	Tunerup (USA); 1976	Our Girl (USA)	Nell-Girl (USA)
Dam Lady Aspasia (USA) 1985	Aspasia Ivor (USA); 1972	Sir Ivor (USA)	Sir Gaylord (USA)
Dam Lady Aspasia (USA) 1985	Aspasia Ivor (USA); 1972	Sir Ivor (USA)	Attica (USA)
Dam Lady Aspasia (USA) 1985	Aspasia Ivor (USA); 1972	Aspasia (ARG)	In the Gloaming (GB)
Dam Lady Aspasia (USA) 1985	Aspasia Ivor (USA); 1972	Aspasia (ARG)	Asturias (ARG)
