= Hedley Woodhouse =

Canadian jockey (1920–1984)

Personal information
- Born: January 23, 1920 Vancouver, British Columbia, Canada
- Died: December 29, 1984 (aged 64) Franklin Square, New York, United States
- Occupation: Jockey

Horse racing career
- Sport: Horse racing
- Career wins: 2,642

Major racing wins
- Vanity Handicap (1944); Hollywood Gold Cup (1944); Yankee Handicap (1945, 1951); Butler Handicap (1946, 1952); Comely Stakes (1946, 1961); Juvenile Stakes (1948); Metropolitan Handicap (1949, 1950); Champagne Stakes (1950, 1953); Edgemere Handicap (1950, 1956); Matron Stakes (1950, 1951); Royal Palm Handicap (1950, 1951); Spinaway Stakes (1950); Fleetwing Handicap (1951, 1952); Tremont Stakes (1951, 1955); American Legion Handicap (1952, 1954, 1956); Daingerfield Handicap (1952); Jamaica Handicap (1952); Roamer Handicap (1952, 1955); Astoria Stakes (1953, 1969); Cowdin Stakes (1953, 1956); Gotham Stakes (1954, 1957); Lawrence Realization Stakes (1954, 1957); National Stallion Stakes (1954); Saratoga Handicap (1954); Travers Stakes (1954, 1956); Wilson Handicap (1954, 1956); Champlain Handicap (1955); Fall Highweight Handicap (1955); Futurity Stakes (1955); Great American Stakes (1955); Laurel Futurity (1955, 1959); Pimlico Special (1955); Remsen Stakes (1955); Toboggan Handicap (1955); Vosburgh Stakes (1955); Whitney Handicap (1955); Coaching Club American Oaks (1956); Gardenia Stakes (1956); Monmouth Oaks (1956); Withers Stakes (1956, 1960, 1961); Acorn Stakes (1960); Oceanport Handicap (1960); Dwyer Stakes (1961); Firenze Handicap (1961); Sorority Stakes (1961); National Stallion Stakes (filly division) (1963); United Nations Handicap (1967)

Honours
- British Columbia Sports Hall of Fame (1979); Canadian Horse Racing Hall of Fame (1980)

Significant horses
- Happy Issue, Faultless, Fisherman, Sailor, Three Rings
- Updated on March 25, 2007

Hedley John Woodhouse (January 23, 1920 - December 29, 1984) was a Canadian jockey who won the New York state riding championship in 1953. Born in Vancouver, British Columbia, he began his racing career there in 1937 at the Lansdowne Park racetrack as an apprentice with A.C.T. Stock Farm owned by industrialist Austin C. Taylor. Woodhouse's ability would soon see him racing at tracks along the West Coast of the United States and in 1944 he rode Happy Issue to victory in the Grade I Vanity Handicap and Hollywood Gold Cup at Hollywood Park Racetrack in Inglewood, California.

Woodhouse rode the colt Fisherman to a 3rd-place finish in the 1949 Kentucky Derby, the best result of his four tries between then and 1957. He rode in the Preakness Stakes on three occasions, his best finish a 5th in 1951. Racing out of New York tracks in the first part of the 1950s, Hedley Woodhouse won the 1953 New York riding championship with 138 victories, and was runner-up on three occasions.

After finishing 7th in the 1954 Kentucky Derby on "Fisherman", a colt owned by Cornelius Vanderbilt Whitney and trained by Sylvester Veitch, Woodhouse came within a neck of winning the Belmont Stakes. His 2nd-place finish was his best in the third of the American Triple Crown races.

From being based in New York, Hedley Woodhouse would make his way to the Florida racing circuit where remarkably at age 50 he won the 1970 jockey title at Tropical Park in Miami. He retired the following year having won 2,642 races. Woodhouse said Three Rings was the best horse he ever rode, adding at his peak, Three Rings was "the best handicap horse in the country." He was inducted into the British Columbia Sports Hall of Fame in 1979 and the Canadian Horse Racing Hall of Fame in 1980.

Married to Elsie Woodhouse (1919–1998), their son Robert was also a successful jockey, capturing a number of important stakes races on the New York circuit. Hedley and Robert Woodhouse are the only father and son to win the Whitney Handicap.

Hedley Woodhouse died of cancer in 1984.
