= Wally Dunn =

American horse trainer (1911–2004)

Personal information
- Born: December 4, 1911 Minitonas, Manitoba, Canada
- Died: April 21, 2004 (aged 92) Arcadia, California
- Occupation: Trainer

Horse racing career
- Sport: Horse racing

Major racing wins
- Blue Grass Stakes (1953); Hollywood Gold Cup Stakes (1954, 1964); Honeymoon Stakes (1957); American Handicap (1964); Ashland Stakes (1964); Kentucky Oaks (1964); Santa Anita Oaks (1964); Sunset Handicap (1964)

Honors
- British Columbia Horse Racing Hall of Fame

Significant horses
- Correspondent, Colorado King, Blue Norther

Thomas Wallace Dunn (December 4, 1911 – April 21, 2004) was a Canadian-born Thoroughbred horse trainer.

Born in Minitonas, Manitoba, Wally Dunn went to Vancouver, British Columbia, at age seventeen, where he would find work in Thoroughbred horse racing. One of five brothers who became involved in the sport, his brother Wilson Dunn bred George Royal and brother George trained the 1965 Canadian Horse of the Year. In the 1930s, Wally Dunn took horses south to race at Santa Anita Park in Los Angeles, California.

Dunn's career as a trainer was interrupted by World War II when he served overseas with the Canadian Army. After the war, Dunn returned to train in California. Among his notable Thoroughbreds was in Correspondent who won 1953's Blue Grass Stakes at Keeneland Race Course and the following year the Hollywood Gold Cup Stakes at Hollywood Park Racetrack. Wally Dunn had four horses compete in the Kentucky Derby and two in the Preakness Stakes. Correspondent's 5th-place finish was his most successful Derby and in 1962 Green Hornet gave a 6th place best in the Preakness.

In 1964, he trained Colorado King who also won the Hollywood Gold Cup Stakes and equalled the world record time of 1:46.40 for 1 1/8 miles in winning the American Handicap. The South-African-Bred Colorado King followed his American and Gold Cup wins with a dominating win in the Sunset Handicap at Hollywood Park.

Wally Dunn died on April 21, 2004, at his home in Arcadia, California, at the age of 92.
