= Gran Premio Dos Mil Guineas =

- Class: Group 1
- Inaugurated: 1980

Race information
- Distance: 1600 meters
- Surface: Turf
- Track: Hipódromo de San Isidro
- Qualification: Three-year-old colts
- Weight: 56 kilograms
- Purse: $71,000,000 ARS (2026); 1st: $36,000,000 ARS

The Gran Premio Dos Mil Guineas is a Group 1 horse race in Argentina run over 1600 meters on the turf at Hipódromo de San Isidro.

It is the first race in the San Isidro Colt Triple Crown.

== History ==
The Gran Premio Dos Mil Guineas was first run in 1980 as a Group 2 race before being upgraded to a Group 1 race in 1982.

== Records since 1988 ==
Speed record:

- 1:32.36 – Gentlemen (1995)

Largest margin of victory:

- 13 lengths – Grito de Amor (2017)

Most wins by a jockey:

- 3 – Pablo Gustavo Falero (1994, 2003, 2012)
- 3 – Juan Carlos Noriega (2001, 2002, 2014)

Most wins by a trainer:

- 4 – Juan Carlos H. Etchechoury (1988, 1995, 1999, 2010)
- 4 – Carlos D. Etchechoury (2006, 2007, 2009, 2022)

Most wins by an owner:

- 3 – Haras La Providencia (2005, 2015, 2018)
- 3 – Las Montijas (2016, 2021, 2022)

Most wins by a breeder:

- 4 – Haras Santa Maria de Araras (2003, 2006, 2012, 2021)
- 3 – Haras De La Pomme (1995, 1999, 2007)
- 3 – Haras La Providencia (2005, 2015, 2018)

== Winners since 1988 ==
Year	Winner	Jockey	Trainer	Owner	Breeder	Time	Margin	Ref
2026	Colorado Del Monte	Gustavo E. Calvente	Enrique Martín Ferro	Stud Facundito	Haras El Paraiso	1:35.27	3/4 length	
2025	The Great Racing	William Pereyra	Juan Francio Saldivia	Stud Patria Blanca	Haras Firmamento	1:34.59	2 lengths	
2024	Colifato Novo	Joaquín Alberto Cano	Ricardo González	Stud El Ranquel	Maximiliano Marcelo Conti	1:38.10	3/4 length	
2023	Epityrum	Juan Cruz Villagra	Nicólas Martín Ferro	Stud Mistica	Haras Tiveres	1:34.92	Head	
2022	Jass Seiver	Adrian M. Giannetti	Carlos D. Etchechoury	Stud Las Monjitas	Haras Firmamento	1:36.13	1 1/2 lengths	
2021	Vespaciano	Adrian Maximiliano Giannetti	Juan Manuel Etchechoury	Stud Las Monjitas	Haras Santa Maria de Araras	1:33.64	4 lengths	
2020	Not run							
2019	Imperador	William Pereyra	Diego Peña	Stud RDI (SI)	Haras Rio Dois Irmaos S.R.L.	1:37.33	Nose	
2018	On the Road	Altair Domingos	Filho Pedro Nickel	Haras La Providencia	Haras La Providencia	1:44.10	1/2 length	
2017	Grito de Amor	Geronimo Joaquín García	Juan J. Benitez	Stud Patero (Gguay)	Haras El Chichino	1:40.01	13 lengths	
2016	Hat Puntano	Adrian M. Giannetti	Juan Javier Etchechoury	Stud Las Monjitas	Haras La Biznaga	1:38.70	5 lengths	
2015	Hi Happy	Altair Domingos	Filho Pedro Nickel	Haras La Providencia	Haras La Providencia	1:40.76	1 1/2 lengths	
2014	Blues Traveler	Juan Carlos Noriega	Miguel Angel Suarez	Stud Alegria	Haras Abolengo	1:36.95	1/2 length	
2013	Zapata	Jorge G. Ruíz Díaz	Alfredo F. Gaitán Dassié	Stud RDI (SI)	Haras El Mallin	1:33.51	2 lengths	
2012	Johnny Guitar	Pablo Gustavo Falero	Juan Sebastian Maldotti	Haras Santa Maria de Araras	Haras Santa Maria de Araras	1:39.75	2 1/2 lengths	
2011	Suggestive Boy	Eduardo Ortega Pavón	Alfredo F. Gaitán Dassié	Haras Pozo de Luna (SI)	Haras Futuro S.R.L.	1:32.44	1/2 length	
2010	Anaerbrio	Julio Cesar Mendez	Juan Carlos H. Etchechoury	Stud La Frontera (MZA)	Haras La Madrugada	1:35.90	3/4 length	
2009	Pick Out	Rodrigo G. Blanco	Carlos D. Etchechoury	Stud El Gusy	Haras Orilla del Monte	1:33.26	1/2 head	
2008	Ever Peace	Mario Luis Leyes	Rosana M. San Millan	Haras Rincón de Piedra	Haras Abolengo	1:33.48	3 1/2 lengths	
2007	Indio Glorioso	Julio César Méndez	Carlos D. Etchechoury	Stud S. de B.	Haras De La Pomme	1:33.65	1/2 length	
2006	Joe Louis	Rodrigo Gonzalo Blanco	Carlos D. Etchechoury	Stud El Gusy	Haras Santa Maria de Araras	1:34.08	3/4 length	
2005	Norton	Cardenas E. Talaverano	Alves José Martins	Haras La Providencia	Haras La Providencia	1:33.59	3 lengths	
2004	Now Mont	Pablo Sotelo Camacho	Horacio José A. Torres	Haras Dilu	Nestor Emilio Otero	1:33.98	Nose	
2003	Disney Walt	Pablo Gustavo Falero	Juan Carlos Maldotti	Haras Santa Maria de Araras	Haras Santa Maria de Araras	1:33.65	1 1/2 lengths	
2002	Recordado	Juan Carlos Noriega	Roberto Pellegatta	Stud Cris-Fer (LP)	Haras Avourneen	1:34.08	1 1/2 lengths	
2001	Dr. Ciro	Juan Carlos Noriega	Roberto Pellegatta	Stud F.F.C.	Zubizarreta Javier (Succession) Curutchet Jorge Oscar	1:34.70	Neck	
2000	Lord Jim	Cristian F. Quiles	José C. Cepeda	Haras Don Yeye	Cesar O. Pasarotti	1:33.43	3/4 length	
1999	Asidero	Cardenas E. Talaverano	Juan Carlos H. Etchechoury	Haras De La Pomme	Haras De La Pomme	1:35.19	2 1/2 lengths	
1998	Mechon Tom	Cristian F. Quiles	Derli A. Gomez	Stud Madrisil	Haras La Biznaga	1:33.75	2 1/2 lengths	
1997	Chullo	Oscar Fabián Conti	Eduardo M. Martínez De Hoz	Haras San Pablo	Haras San Pablo	1:33.13	4 1/2 lengths	
1996	Rondo	Guillermo Enrique Sena	José Luis Palacios	Stud Calfucura (SI)	Haras El Candil	1:33.55	8 lengths	
1995	Gentlemen	Jacinto Rafael Herrera	Juan Carlos H. Etchechoury	Haras De La Pomme	Haras De La Pomme	1:32.36	1/2 head	
1994	Brother Son	Pablo Gustavo Falero	Juan Carlos Maldotti	Stud Les Amis	Haras Tres Pinos	1:34.10	1/2 head	
1993	Huido	Luis Alberto Triviño	Enrique Clerc	San Gilberto (LP)	Cornelio Donovan & Eduar Solveyra	1:35.80		
1992	Bon Poulain	Guillermo Enrique Sena	Juan A. Maldotti	Stud La Titina	Haras Income	1:36.20	1 1/2 lengths	
1991	L'Express	José Luis Batruni	Angel Adami	Haras La Borinqueña	Haras La Borinqueña	1:34.80		
1990	Algenib	Miguel Ángel Sarati	Ernesto Eusebio Romero	Haras El Galo	Haras El Galo	1:35.60		
1989	Speed Boy		Waldir Libero Zancanaro	Vengador		1:36.40	1/2 head	
1988	Man Toss	Jorge S. Caro Araya	Juan Carlos H. Etchechoury	Stud Tarpan		1:36.00		

== Earlier winners ==
- 1980: Pajarraco
- 1981: New Dandy
- 1982: Agigantado
- 1983: El Violinista
- 1984: Puma
- 1985: El Sabi
- 1986: Ieron
- 1987: Fairfield
