= Hollywood Gold Cup Stakes =

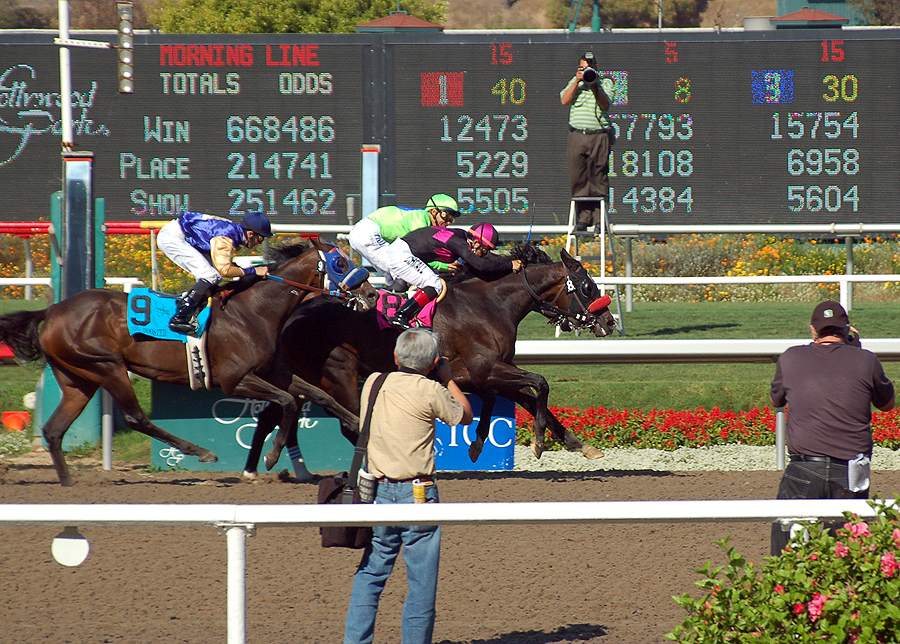
- Lava Man winning the 2007 Gold Cup
- Class: Grade II
- Location: Santa Anita Park; Arcadia, California, U.S.
- Inaugurated: 1938 at Hollywood Park Racetrack
- Race type: Thoroughbred – Flat racing
- Website: www.santaanita.com

Race information
- Distance: 1 1/4 miles (10 furlongs)
- Surface: Dirt
- Track: left-handed
- Qualification: Three-year-olds and up
- Weight: Base weights with allowances: 4-year-olds and up: 126 lbs. 3-year-olds: 118 lbs.
- Purse: $200,000 (since 2024)

The Hollywood Gold Cup Stakes is a Grade II American thoroughbred horse race for horses age three and older over a distance of 1 1/4 miles on the dirt held at Santa Anita Park in Arcadia, California in May. The race currently offers a purse of $200,000.

== History ==
=== Early beginnings ===
The race inaugurated in 1938 at Hollywood Park Racetrack in Inglewood, California as the Hollywood Gold Cup.

Hollywood Park Racetrack opened its doors on June 10, 1938, and Seabiscuit, under jockey George Woolf, won the $50,000 added race's inaugural running on July 16.

The race was not run in 1942 or 1943 due to Hollywood Park being closed and used as an airplane parts storage depot during World War II.

=== Post World War II ===
In 1949, the Hollywood Gold Cup, as well as the entire 1949 meeting, was held at Santa Anita Park, due to a devastating fire at Hollywood Park on the night of May 5, 1949. Solidarity won the 1949 running on July 16. The Hollywood Park grandstand was rebuilt and the facility reopened in time for a two-part split 1950 season. The 1950 Hollywood Gold Cup, won by Noor, was held in the second part or Fall–Winter part of the split, on December 9, 1950. The following summer, the race returned to its usual mid-July running and Citation, in his final race, won the Hollywood Gold Cup on July 14, 1951, becoming the first thoroughbred racehorse to hit the career earnings mark of one million dollars.

=== Modern Era ===
In 1980, Mary Lou Tuck became the first woman trainer to win the Hollywood Gold Cup with Go West Young Man.

In 1999, the Blood-Horse magazine List of the Top 100 U.S. Racehorses of the 20th Century was published, and fourteen horses on the list had won the Hollywood Gold Cup: Citation, Affirmed, Round Table, Cigar, Swaps, Seabiscuit, Skip Away, Gallant Man, Challedon, Ack Ack, Native Diver, Noor, Two Lea and Exceller.

In the 73rd running of the Hollywood Gold Cup in 2012, Chantal Sutherland, aboard Game On Dude, became the first female jockey to win the race. Game On Dude had also been Sutherland's mount in the previous year's running, finishing second by a nose to First Dude. The ride had given Sutherland the distinction of being the first female jockey to have a mount in the Hollywood Gold Cup.

=== Fillies or Mare winners ===
Only three fillies or mares have ever won the (Hollywood) Gold Cup. Happy Issue was the first in 1944, followed by Two Lea in 1952 and Princessnesian in 1968.

=== Change of venue ===
Following the closure of Hollywood Park, the race moved to Santa Anita Park in 2014 (where the race was run in 1949 because of a fire at Hollywood Park) and renamed the Gold Cup at Santa Anita Stakes.

The event is a Breeders' Cup Classic "Win and You're In" qualifier.

The event is one of the premier distance races on the West Coast of the United States, along with the Santa Anita Handicap from Santa Anita Park, and the Pacific Classic Stakes at Del Mar Racetrack.

In 2020 the name of the event reverted to the Hollywood Gold Cup.

=== Race conditions ===
It was run as a handicap race until 1997, when it was switched to weight-for-age conditions. In 2005, the Gold Cup returned to the original handicap format.

== Records ==
Time record:

- 1:58.20 – Quack (1972) (on natural dirt) (New track record, equaled world record)
- 2:00.75 – Rail Trip (2009) (on Cushion Track)

Most wins:

- 3 – Native Diver (1965, 1966, 1967)
- 3 – Lava Man (2005, 2006, 2007)

Most wins by an owner:

- 3 – Charles S. Howard (1938, 1939, 1950)
- 3 – Calumet Farm (1951, 1952, 1990)
- 3 – Louis K. Shapiro (1965, 1966, 1967)
- 3 – STD Racing Stable/Jason Wood (2005, 2006, 2007)

Most wins by a jockey:

- 9 – Laffit Pincay Jr. (1970, 1975, 1977, 1979, 1982, 1985, 1986, 2001, 2002)

Most wins by a trainer:

- 10 – Bob Baffert (1999, 2003, 2011, 2012, 2013, 2017, 2020, 2021, 2023, 2024)

== Winners ==
| Year | Winner | Age | Jockey | Trainer | Owner | Distance | Time | Purse | Grade | Ref |
|---|---|---|---|---|---|---|---|---|---|---|
At Santa Anita Park – Hollywood Gold Cup Stakes
| 2026 | Forged Steel | 4 | Flavien Prat | Saffie A. Joseph Jr. | C2 Racing Stable and Mathis Stables | 1 1/4 miles | 2:01.58 | $200,000 | II | |
| 2025 | Skippylongstocking | 6 | Irad Ortiz Jr. | Saffie Joseph Jr. | Daniel Alonso | 1 1/4 miles | 2:01.64 | $201,000 | II | |
| 2024 | Mr Fisk | 4 | Kazushi Kimura | Bob Baffert | Sunny Brook Stables | 1 1/4 miles | 2:03.01 | $200,000 | II | |
| 2023 | Defunded | 5 | Juan Hernandez | Bob Baffert | Michael E. Pegram, Karl Watson and Paul Weitman | 1 1/4 miles | 2:02.85 | $400,500 | I | |
| 2022 | There Goes Harvard | 4 | Irad Ortiz Jr | Michael W. McCarthy | Cannon Thoroughbreds | 1 1/4 miles | 2:02.66 | $400,000 | I | |
| 2021 | Country Grammer | 4 | Flavien Prat | Bob Baffert | WinStar Farm | 1 1/4 miles | 2:02.23 | $301,000 | I | |
| 2020 | Improbable | 4 | Drayden Van Dyke | Bob Baffert | WinStar Farm, China Horse Club & SF Racing | 1 1/4 miles | 2:01.69 | $300,500 | I | |
Gold Cup at Santa Anita Stakes
| 2019 | Vino Rosso | 4 | John R. Velazquez | Todd A. Pletcher | Repole Stable & St. Elias Stable | 1 1/4 miles | 2:03.00 | $500,702 | I | |
| 2018 | Accelerate | 5 | Victor Espinoza | John W. Sadler | Hronis Racing | 1 1/4 miles | 2:01.38 | $500,345 | I | |
| 2017 | Cupid | 4 | Rafael Bejarano | Bob Baffert | Michael Tabor, Mrs. John Magnier & Derrick Smith | 1 1/4 miles | 2:00.89 | $500,690 | I | |
| 2016 | Melatonin | 5 | Joseph Talamo | David E. Hofmans | Tarabilla Farms | 1 1/4 miles | 1:59.79 | $501,035 | I | |
| 2015 | Hard Aces | 5 | Victor Espinoza | John W. Sadler | Hronis Racing | 1 1/4 miles | 2:02.46 | $501,500 | I | |
| 2014 | Majestic Harbor | 6 | Tyler Baze | Sean McCarthy | Gallant Stable | 1 1/4 miles | 2:01.53 | $500,500 | I | |
At Hollywood Park – Hollywood Gold Cup
| 2013 | Game On Dude | 6 | Mike E. Smith | Bob Baffert | Diamond Pride, Lanni Family Trust, Mercedes Stable & B. Schiappa | 1 1/4 miles | 2:01.88 | $500,000 | I | |
| 2012 | Game On Dude | 5 | Chantal Sutherland | Bob Baffert | Diamond Pride, Lanni Family Trust, Mercedes Stable & B. Schiappa | 1 1/4 miles | 2:04.19 | $500,000 | I | |
| 2011 | First Dude | 6 | Martin Garcia | Bob Baffert | Donald R. Dizney | 1 1/4 miles | 2:01.57 | $500,000 | I | |
| 2010 | Awesome Gem | 7 | David R. Flores | Craig Dollase | WestPoint Thoroughbreds | 1 1/4 miles | 2:03.31 | $500,000 | I | |
| 2009 | Rail Trip | 4 | Jose Valdivia Jr. | Ronald W. Ellis | Jay Em Ess Stable | 1 1/4 miles | 2:00.75 | $700,000 | I | |
| 2008 | Mast Track | 4 | Tyler Baze | Robert J. Frankel | Robert J. Frankel | 1 1/4 miles | 2:01.37 | $750,000 | I | |
| 2007 | Lava Man | 6 | Corey Nakatani | Doug F. O'Neill | STD Racing & Jason Wood | 1 1/4 miles | 2:03.21 | $750,000 | I | |
| 2006 | Lava Man | 5 | Corey Nakatani | Doug F. O'Neill | STD Racing & Jason Wood | 1 1/4 miles | 2:01.16 | $750,000 | I | |
| 2005 | Lava Man | 4 | Pat Valenzuela | Doug F. O'Neill | STD Racing & Jason Wood | 1 1/4 miles | 1:59.63 | $750,000 | I | |
| 2004 | Total Impact (CHI) | 6 | Mike E. Smith | Laura de Seroux | Sultan bin Mohammed Al Kabeer & S. A. Bridport | 1 1/4 miles | 2:00.72 | $750,000 | I | |
| 2003 | Congaree | 5 | Jerry D. Bailey | Bob Baffert | Stonerside Stable | 1 1/4 miles | 2:00.48 | $750,000 | I | |
| 2002 | Sky Jack | 6 | Laffit Pincay Jr. | Doug F. O'Neill | Rene & Margie Lambert | 1 1/4 miles | 2:01.73 | $750,000 | I | |
| 2001 | †§ Aptitude | 4 | Laffit Pincay Jr. | Robert J. Frankel | Juddmonte Farms | 1 1/4 miles | 2:01.79 | $750,000 | I | |
| 2000 | Early Pioneer | 5 | Victor Espinoza | Vladimir Cerin | David & Holly Wilson | 1 1/4 miles | 2:01.40 | $1,000,000 | I | |
| 1999 | Real Quiet | 4 | Jerry D. Bailey | Bob Baffert | Michael E. Pegram | 1 1/4 miles | 1:59.67 | $1,000,000 | I | |
| 1998 | Skip Away | 5 | Jerry D. Bailey | Sonny Hine | Carolyn Hine | 1 1/4 miles | 2:00.16 | $1,000,000 | I | |
| 1997 | § Gentlemen ((ARG)) | 5 | Gary L. Stevens | Richard E. Mandella | Andrea E. Stable & R. D. Hubbard | 1 1/4 miles | 1:59.26 | $1,125,000 | I | |
| 1996 | Siphon (BRZ) | 5 | David R. Flores | Richard E. Mandella | Rio Claro Thoroughbreds | 1 1/4 miles | 2:00.50 | $1,000,000 | I | |
| 1995 | Cigar | 5 | Jerry D. Bailey | William I. Mott | Allen E. Paulson | 1 1/4 miles | 1:59.46 | $1,000,000 | I | |
| 1994 | Slew of Damascus | 6 | Gary L. Stevens | Craig G. Roberts | Edris Harbeston, George Losh & Vic Naccarote | 1 1/4 miles | 2:00.76 | $750,000 | I | |
| 1993 | Best Pal | 5 | Corey Black | Gary F. Jones | Golden Eagle Farm | 1 1/4 miles | 2:00.17 | $750,000 | I | |
| 1992 | Sultry Song | 4 | Jerry D. Bailey | Patrick J. Kelly | Live Oak Racing | 1 1/4 miles | 2:00.23 | $1,037,500 | I | |
| 1991 | Marquetry | 4 | David R. Flores | Robert J. Frankel | Juddmonte Farms | 1 1/4 miles | 1:59.50 | $1,000,000 | I | |
| 1990 | Criminal Type | 5 | José A. Santos | D. Wayne Lukas | Calumet Farm & Jurgen K. Arnemann | 1 1/4 miles | 1:59.80 | $1,000,000 | I | |
| 1989 | Blushing John | 4 | Pat Day | Richard J. Lundy | Allen E. Paulson | 1 1/4 miles | 2:00.40 | $500,000 | I | |
| 1988 | Cutlass Reality | 6 | Gary L. Stevens | Craig Anthony Lewis | Howard Crash/Jim Hankoff | 1 1/4 miles | 1:59.40 | $500,000 | I | |
| 1987 | Ferdinand | 4 | Bill Shoemaker | Charles E. Whittingham | Elizabeth A. Keck | 1 1/4 miles | 2:00.60 | $500,000 | I | |
| 1986 | Super Diamond | 6 | Laffit Pincay Jr. | Edwin J. Gregson | Roland & Ramona Sahm | 1 1/4 miles | 2:00.40 | $500,000 | I | |
| 1985 | Greinton (GB) | 4 | Laffit Pincay Jr. | Charles E. Whittingham | Mary J. Bradley, Charles Whittingham & Howell Wynne | 1 1/4 miles | 1:58.40 | $500,000 | I | |
| 1984 | Desert Wine | 4 | Eddie Delahoussaye | Jerry M. Fanning | T90 Ranch | 1 1/4 miles | 2:00.40 | $500,000 | I | |
| 1983 | Island Whirl | 3 | Eddie Delahoussaye | Laz Barrera | Elcee-H Stable | 1 1/4 miles | 1:59.40 | $500,000 | I | |
| 1982 | Perrault (GB) | 5 | Laffit Pincay Jr. | Charles E. Whittingham | Thierry van Zuylen & Serge Fradkoff | 1 1/4 miles | 1:59.20 | $500,000 | I | |
| 1981 | ° Eleven Stitches | 4 | Sandy Hawley | Donn L. Luby | Morey & Claudia Mirkin | 1 1/4 miles | 2:00.40 | $500,000 | I | |
| 1980 | Go West Young Man | 5 | Eddie Delahoussaye | Mary Lou Tuck | Wild Plum Farm | 1 1/4 miles | 1:58.80 | $400,000 | I | |
| 1979 | Affirmed | 4 | Laffit Pincay Jr. | Laz Barrera | Harbor View Farm | 1 1/4 miles | 1:58.40 | $500,000 | I | |
| 1978 | Exceller | 5 | Bill Shoemaker | Charles E. Whittingham | Nelson Bunker Hunt & Belaire Stud | 1 1/4 miles | 1:59.20 | $350,000 | I | |
| 1977 | Crystal Water | 4 | Laffit Pincay Jr. | Roger E. Clapp | Connie M. Ring | 1 1/4 miles | 2:00.00 | $350,000 | I | |
| 1976 | Pay Tribute | 4 | Marco Castaneda | Ron McAnally | Elmendorf Farm | 1 1/4 miles | 1:58.80 | $250,000 | I | |
| 1975 | Ancient Title | 5 | Laffit Pincay Jr. | Keith L. Stucki Sr. | Kirkland Stable | 1 1/4 miles | 1:59.20 | $150,000 | I | |
| 1974 | § Tree of Knowledge | 4 | Bill Shoemaker | Charles Whittingham | Pin Oak Stud | 1 1/4 miles | 1:59.80 | $150,000 | I | |
| 1973 | Kennedy Road | 5 | Bill Shoemaker | Charles Whittingham | Mrs. A. W. Stollery | 1 1/4 miles | 1:59.40 | $150,000 | I | |
| 1972 | Quack | 3 | Donald Pierce | Charles Whittingham | Bwamazon Farm | 1 1/4 miles | 1:58.20 | $175,000 | | |
| 1971 | Ack Ack | 5 | Bill Shoemaker | Charles Whittingham | Forked Lightning Ranch | 1 1/4 miles | 1:59.80 | $175,000 | | |
| 1970 | Pleasure Seeker | 4 | Laffit Pincay Jr. | Carl Vandervoort Jr. | Carl Vandervoort Jr., Donald Brokaw, A. L. Johnson | 1 1/4 miles | 1:59.40 | $162,100 | | |
| 1969 | Figonero (ARG) | 4 | Álvaro Pineda | Warren Stute | Clement L. Hirsch | 1 1/4 miles | 1:58.80 | $162,100 | | |
| 1968 | ∞§ Princessnesian | 4 | Donald Pierce | James W. Maloney | William Haggin Perry | 1 1/4 miles | 1:59.80 | $162,100 | | |
| 1967 | Native Diver | 8 | Jerry Lambert | Buster Millerick | Mr. & Mrs Louis K. Shapiro | 1 1/4 miles | 1:58.80 | $162,100 | | |
| 1966 | Native Diver | 7 | Jerry Lambert | Buster Millerick | Mr. & Mrs Louis K. Shapiro | 1 1/4 miles | 2:00.00 | $162,100 | | |
| 1965 | Native Diver | 6 | Jerry Lambert | Buster Millerick | Mr. & Mrs Louis K. Shapiro | 1 1/4 miles | 2:00.20 | $162,100 | | |
| 1964 | Colorado King (SAF) | 5 | Ray York | Wally Dunn | Poltex Stable, Fritz Hawn, Keith Freeman & Roland Bond | 1 1/4 miles | 2:00.40 | $162,100 | | |
| 1963 | Cadiz (NZ) | 7 | Eddie Burns | Robert L. Wheeler | Vicgray Farm | 1 1/4 miles | 1:59.60 | $162,100 | | |
| 1962 | Prove It | 5 | Henry E. Moreno | Mesh Tenney | Rex C. Ellsworth | 1 1/4 miles | 2:00.00 | $162,100 | | |
| 1961 | § Prince Blessed | 4 | Johnny Longden | James I. Nazworthy | Kerr Stable | 1 1/4 miles | 1:59.80 | $162,100 | | |
| 1960 | Dotted Swiss | 4 | Eddie Burns | Robert L. Wheeler | Cornelius V. Whitney | 1 1/4 miles | 1:59.40 | $162,100 | | |
| 1959 | Hillsdale | 4 | Tommy Barrow | Martin L. Fallon Jr. | Clarence Whitted Smith | 1 1/4 miles | 1:59.20 | $162,100 | | |
| 1958 | Gallant Man | 4 | Bill Shoemaker | John A. Nerud | Ralph Lowe | 1 1/4 miles | 2:01.60 | $162,100 | | |
| 1957 | Round Table | 3 | Bill Shoemaker | William Molter | Kerr Stable | 1 1/4 miles | 1:58.60 | $162,100 | | |
| 1956 | Swaps | 4 | Bill Shoemaker | Mesh Tenney | Rex C. Ellsworth | 1 1/4 miles | 1:58.60 | $162,100 | | |
| 1955 | Rejected | 5 | Gordon Glisson | William J. Hirsch | King Ranch | 1 1/4 miles | 1:59.60 | $137,100 | | |
| 1954 | Correspondent | 4 | Eddie Arcaro | Wally Dunn | Mrs. Gordon Guiberson | 1 1/4 miles | 2:00.80 | $137,100 | | |
| 1953 | § Royal Serenade (IRE) | 5 | Johnny Longden | Vance Longden | Alberta Ranches, Ltd. | 1 1/4 miles | 2:00.80 | $137,100 | | |
| 1952 | ∞ Two Lea | 6 | Steve Brooks | Horace A. Jones | Calumet Farm | 1 1/4 miles | 2:00.20 | $137,100 | | |
| 1951 | § Citation | 6 | Steve Brooks | Horace A. Jones | Calumet Farm | 1 1/4 miles | 2:01.00 | $137,100 | | |
| 1950 | Noor | 5 | Johnny Longden | Burley Parke | Charles S. Howard | 1 1/4 miles | 1:59.80 | $137,100 | | |
At Santa Anita Park
| 1949 | Solidarity | 4 | Ralph Neves | Carl A. Roles | Bernice Curland Goldstone | 1 1/4 miles | 2:01.20 | $137,100 | | |
At Hollywood Park
| 1948 | § Shannon II (AUS) | 7 | Johnny Adams | William Molter | Neil S. McCarthy | 1 1/4 miles | 2:01.60 | $113,700 | | |
| 1947 | Cover Up | 4 | Robert Permane | Ross Brinson | Zack Addington | 1 1/4 miles | 2:00.00 | $118,500 | | |
| 1946 | Triplicate | 5 | Basil James | Clyde Phillips | Fred Astaire | 1 1/4 miles | 2:00.40 | $114,900 | | |
| 1945 | Challenge Me | 4 | Anthony Skoronski | Earl G. Porter | Brolite Farm | 1 1/4 miles | 2:00.40 | $78,400 | | |
| 1944 | ∞ Happy Issue | 4 | Hedley Woodhouse | Jean Charles Pinon | Happy Stable | 1 1/4 miles | 2:01.60 | $87,650 | | |
| 1942–1943 | | Race not held | | | | | | | | |
| 1941 | § Big Pebble | 5 | Jack Westrope | William Finnegan | Circle M Ranch | 1 1/4 miles | 2:02.60 | $89,550 | | |
| 1940 | Challedon | 4 | George Woolf | Louis Schaefer | William L. Brann | 1 1/4 miles | 2:02.00 | $53,700 | | |
| 1939 | Kayak II (ARG) | 4 | George Woolf | Tom Smith | Charles S. Howard | 1 1/4 miles | 2:02.60 | $52,575 | | |
| 1938 | Seabiscuit | 5 | George Woolf | Tom Smith | Charles S. Howard | 1 1/4 miles | 2:03.80 | $55,650 | | |

Legend:
All Weather Track Dirt
Notes:
† Futural won the race but was disqualified for interference
§ Ran as part of an entry
° Caterman was first past the post but was disqualified and placed second
∞ Filly or Mare

== See also ==
- List of American and Canadian Graded races
- Gold Cup at Santa Anita top three finishers
