= Gran Premio Gran Criterium =

G1 horse race in Argentina

- Class: Group 1
- Inaugurated: 1980

Race information
- Distance: 1600 meters
- Surface: Turf
- Track: Hipódromo de San Isidro
- Qualification: Two-year-old colts
- Weight: 55 kg
- Purse: $71,000,000 ARS (2026); 1st: $36,000,000 ARS

The Gran Premio Gran Criterium (previously known as the Gran Premio Stud Book Argentino) is a Group 1 thoroughbred horse race run at Hipódromo de San Isidro in Buenos Aires, Argentina, open to two-year-old colts. It is run over a distance of 1600 metres (0.99 mi) on the turf.

== History ==
The Gran Premio Gran Criterium was first run in 1980, under the name Gran Premio Stud Book Argentino. It was inaugurated as a Group 1 race, a designation which it has retained.

The Gran Premio Gran Criterium was originally open to fillies, but in 2013 was restricted to colts only.

In 1997 and 1998, the Gran Premio Gran Criterium was run in early July, after the universal birth date in the southern hemisphere, and was thus restricted to three-year-olds rather than two-year-olds.

== Records since 1988 ==
Speed record:

- 1:32.05 – Enak (2009)

Greatest winning margin:

- 8 lengths – Winning Prize (2012) & Seattle Mat (2014)

Most wins by a jockey:

- 4 – Juan Carlos Noriega (1998, 2004, 2013, 2021)
- 3 – José Ricardo Méndez (2005, 2007, 2008)
- 3 – Adrian M. Giannetti (2011, 2016, 2026)

Most wins by a trainer:

- 4 – Alfredo F. Gaitán Dassié (1993, 2002, 2005, 2026)
- 4 – Roberto Pellegatta (2003, 2004, 2006, 2013)
- 4 – Nicolás Martín Ferro (2012, 2015, 2021, 2024)
- 3 – Carlos D. Etchechoury (2011, 2016, 2023)

Most wins by an owner:

- 2 – Stud Doña Ana (2003, 2004)
- 2 – Stud Las Hormigas (2005, 2007)

Most wins by a breeder:

- 3 – Haras de la Pomme (1991, 1999, 2012)
- 3 – Haras Firmamento (2003, 2006, 2014)

== Winners since 1988 ==
Year	Winner	Jockey	Trainer	Owner	Breeder	Time	Margin	Ref
2026	Roi Du Monde	Adrian M. Giannetti	Alfredo F. Gaitán Dassié	Stud RDI	Haras Rio Dois Irmaos	1:36.34	1 length	
2025	Ardiendo	Eduardo Ortega Pavón	Enrique Martín Ferro	Stud San Isidoro	Haras Las Retamas	1:40.28	3 1/2 lengths	
2024	Earth God	F. Fernandes Gonçalves	Nicólas Martín Ferro	Stud Grupo 4	Haras Abolengo	1:36.04	2 lengths	
2023	Unico Happy	Martín Javier Valle	Carlos D. Etchechoury	Haras El Angel de Venecia	Haras La Providencia	1:42.80	2 lengths	
2022	Star Galán	William Pereyra	Juan Franco Saldivia	Stud Egalite de 9	Daniel Dario Mautone	1:37.54	2 lengths	
2021	Shy Friend	Juan Carlos Noriega	Nicólas Martín Ferro	Stud Carmel	Haras Abolengo	1:36.99	2 lengths	
2020	Race not run							
2019	Ivar	José A. Da Silva	Juan Manuel Etchechoury	Stud Haras Rio Dois Irmaos	Stud Haras Rio Dois Irmaos	1:38.07	6 lengths	
2018	Tremendo Tordo	Wilson R. Moreyra	Omar Fernando Labanca	Stud Xallas	Haras El Mallin	1:38.10	3 lengths	
2017	Grito de Amor	Gerónimo J. García	Juan J. Benítez	Stud Patero	Haras El Chichino	1:42.54	1/2 length	
2016	Hat Puntano	Adrián M. Giannetti	Carlos D. Etchechoury	Haras Las Monjitas	Haras La Biznaga	1:34.66	2 lengths	
2015	Willander	Eduardo Ortega Pavón	Nicólas Martín Ferro	Haras El Doguito	Haras El Doguito	1:34.16	2 1/2 lengths	
2014	Seattle Mat	Jorge G. Ruíz Díaz	Ignacio López	Stud De Galera	Haras Firmamento	1:39.91	8 lengths	
2013	Gracias Román	Juan Carlos Noriega	Roberto Pellegatta	Stud Los Cozacos	Centauro SPC, Juan A. Corraro, & others	1:37.11	3 lengths	
2012	Winning Prize	Jorge Antonio Ricardo	Nicólas Martín Ferro	Stud Los Nelson	Haras de la Pomme	1:38.97	8 lengths	
2011	Escape of Glory	Adrián M. Giannetti	Carlos D. Etchechoury	Stud El Gusy	Haras Santa Maria de Araras	1:35.24	2 lengths	
2010	Malhechor Int	Horacio J. Betansos	José Antonio Lofiego	Stud El Zorro	Haras Caryjuan	1:39.86	1/2 neck	
2009	Enak	Damián Ramella	Diego Peña	Haras La Providencia	Haras La Providencia	1:32.05	4 lengths	
2008	Flag Francés	José Ricardo Méndez	Facundo Bunge Frers	Stud F.B.F.	Haras La Madrugada	1:33.65	2 1/2 lengths	
2007	Morador Llers	José Ricardo Méndez	Hugo Fantino Constantino	Stud Las Hormigas	Haras El Paraiso	1:33.21	1 1/2 lengths	
2006	Husson	Gustavo E. Calvente	Roberto Pellegatta	Stud Gladiador	Haras Firmamento	1:32.88	3/4 length	
2005	El Fanfante	José Ricardo Méndez	Alfredo F. Gaitán Dassié	Stud Las Hormigas	Haras Las Camelias	1:34.75	5 lengths	
2004	Frugal Lark	Juan Carlos Noriega	Roberto Pellegatta	Stud Doña Ana	Haras Doña Ana	1:35.68	Neck	
2003	Cacht Wells	Miguel Ángel Sarati	Roberto Pellegatta	Stud Doña Ana	Haras Firmamento	1:33.70	2 lengths	
2002	Eddington	Ángel M. Ramírez	Alfredo F. Gaitán Dassié	Haras Rio Claro	Haras Rio Claro	1:33.81	2 1/2 lengths	
2001	Lac Azur	Jactino R. Herrera	Carlos A. Cascallares	Stud J. y M. V.	Haras La Quebrada	1:35.02	1/2 neck	
2000	Lord Jim	Cristián F. Quiles	José C. Cepeda	Stud Don Yeye	César O. Pasarotti	1:33.97	4 lengths	
1999	Asidero	Cardenas E. Talaverano	Juan Carlos Etchechoury	Haras de la Pomme	Haras de la Pomme	1:32.59	3 1/2 lengths	
1998	Señor Juez	Juan Carlos Noriega	Enrique Clerc	Stud Raffaella	Pablo C. A. Calistri	1:35.66	3/4 length	
1997	Chullo	Oscar Fabián Conti	Eduardo M. Martínez de Hoz	Haras San Pablo	Haras San Pablo	1:33.01	6 lengths	
1996	Malambo Dancer	Horacio E. Karamanos	José Luis Palcios	Stud Fatman	Haras Ojo de Agua	1:33.71	1 1/2 lengths	
1995	Muñecote	Horacio E. Karamanos	Jorge Luis Viego	Haras La Verdad	Haras El Turf	1:33 1/5	1 length	
1994	Brother Son	Pablo Gustavo Falero	Juan Carlos Maldotti	Stud Les Amis	Haras Tres Pinos	1:35 1/5	5 lengths	
1993	Alphard	Juan José Paule	Alfredo F. Gaitán Dassié	Stud Tandil	Haras Comalal	1:36 3/5	Neck	
1992	Toquete	José A. Agüero	Juan C. Baratucci	Stud Orion	Haras El Candil	1:33 3/5	1/2 head	
1991	El Trenzador	Jactino R. Herrera	Juan Carlos Etchechoury	Cabaña Chica Inhabilitada	Haras de la Pomme	1:34		
1990	Fanatic Boy	Oscar Fabián Conti	Gustavo E. Scarpello	Stud Bakane S.	Haras La Biznaga	1:35	Neck	
1989	Leger Cat	Miguel Ángel Abregú		Haras Rosa do Sul	Haras Rosa do Sul	1:35 1/5		
1988	Indian Toss				Stephen C. Clark			

== Earlier winners ==
- 1980: Mountdrago
- 1981: Cosino
- 1982: Boran
- 1983: El Violinista
- 1984: Puma
- 1985: Bonsoir
- 1986: Radical
- 1987: Despótico
