= Native Diver Stakes =

American Thoroughbred horse race

- Class: Grade III
- Location: Del Mar Racetrack; Del Mar, California, United States
- Inaugurated: 1979 (as Native Diver Handicap at Hollywood Park)
- Race type: Thoroughbred - Flat racing
- Website: Del Mar

Race information
- Distance: 1 1/8 miles
- Surface: Dirt
- Track: left-handed
- Qualification: Three-year-olds and up
- Weight: Base weights with allowances: 4-year-olds and up: 125 lbs. 3-year-olds: 122 lbs.
- Purse: $100,000 (since 2016)

The Native Diver Stakes is a Grade III American thoroughbred horse race for three-years-old and older over a distance of one and one eighth miles on the dirt held annually in late November at Del Mar Racetrack in Del Mar, California. The event offers a purse of $100,000.

== History ==
The race is named for one of the great sprinters and one of California’s most favorite horses, Native Diver, who ranks 60th in Blood-Horse magazine List of the Top 100 U.S. Racehorses of the 20th Century.

The event was inaugurated on 6 May 1979 with a recorded crowd of 30,857 in attendance as the Native Diver Handicap at Hollywood Park Racetrack over the one mile distance and was won by the six year old Life's Hope who was trained by the US Hall of Fame trainer Laz Barrera and ridden by the US Hall of Fame jockey Laffit Pincay Jr. in a time of 1:35 flat. The event was classified as Grade II for the first running but the following year it was downgraded to Grade III. The event has remained at that classification.

The 1981 running was scheduled for the Hollywood Park Fall meeting and held on Thanksgiving Day weekend.

The distance of the event was increased to 1 1/16 miles in 1982 then reverted to 1 mile in 1984. In 1986 the distance was set at 1 1/8 miles and has remained at that to date. From 2006 to 2014 it was held on a synthetic dirt surface.

In the 2008 edition, Slew's Tizzy set a new Hollywood Park record for the all weather track for 1 1/8 miles with a winning time of 1:46.78. The time however was not faster than the dirt stakes record which was set by the 1995 Argentine three year old champion Gentlemen (ARG) in the 1996 when he won by nine lengths in 1:45.35.

The event was run as a handicap prior to 2012.

With the closure of Hollywood Park Racetrack in 2013 the event was moved to Del Mar Racetrack.

== Records ==
Speed record:

- 1 1/8 miles: 1:45.35 – Gentlemen (ARG) (1996)
- 1 miles: 1:33.40 - Innamorato (1985)

Margins:

- 9 lengths – Gentlemen (ARG) (1996)

Most wins:

- no horse with more than one win

Most wins by an owner:

- 3 – Karl Watson, Michael E. Pegram & Paul Weitman (2021, 2022, 2025)

Most wins by a jockey:

- 7 – Chris McCarron (1981, 1989, 1990, 1991, 1992, 1994, 1999)

Most wins by a trainer:

- 8 – Richard E. Mandella (1983, 1986, 1994, 1996, 1997, 1998, 2003, 2020)

== Winners ==
Year	Winner	Age	Jockey	Trainer	Owner	Distance	Time	Purse	Grade	Ref
At Del Mar – Native Diver Stakes
2025	Nevada Beach	3	Juan J. Hernandez	Bob Baffert	Karl Watson, Michael E. Pegram & Paul Weitman	1 1/8 miles	1:48.35	$98,000	III	
2024	Skinner	4	Hector Isaac Berrios	John Shirreffs	Sunny Brook Stables	1 1/8 miles	1:48.95	$100,500	III	
2023	Mr Fisk	3	Juan J. Hernandez	Bob Baffert	Sunny Brook Stables	1 1/8 miles	1:49.69	$101,000	III	
2022	Defunded	4	Edwin Maldonado	Bob Baffert	Karl Watson, Michael E. Pegram & Paul Weitman	1 1/8 miles	1:50.12	$150,500	III	
2021	Azul Coast	4	Flavien Prat	Bob Baffert	Karl Watson, Michael E. Pegram & Paul Weitman	1 1/8 miles	1:50.55	$100,500	III	
2020	Extra Hope	4	Juan Hernandez	Richard E. Mandella	Jay Em Ess Stable	1 1/8 miles	1:50.11	$98,000	III	
2019	Midcourt	4	Victor Espinoza	John Shirreffs	C R K Stable	1 1/8 miles	1:48.36	$98,000	III	
2018	Battle of Midway	4	Flavien Prat	Jerry Hollendorfer	Don Alberto Stable & WinStar Farm	1 1/8 miles	1:50.23	$92,000	III	
2017	Prime Attraction	4	Victor Espinoza	James M. Cassidy	D P Racing	1 1/8 miles	1:49.87	$100,690	III	
2016	Midnight Storm	5	Mike E. Smith	Philip D'Amato	Alex Venneri Racing & Little Red Feather Racing	1 1/8 miles	1:51.59	$100,690	III	
2015	Dortmund	3	Gary L. Stevens	Bob Baffert	Kaleem Shah	1 1/8 miles	1:48.06	$150,000	III	
2014	Big Cazanova (ARG)	5	Elvis Trujillo	Peter L. Miller	Wachtel Stable, Gary Barber, Brous Stable & Dona Licha	1 1/8 miles	1:49.28	$200,500	III	
At Hollywood Park – Native Diver Stakes
2013	Blueskiesnrainbows	4	Martin A. Pedroza	Jerry Hollendorfer	Bad Boy Racing & Whizway Farms	1 1/8 miles	1:50.07	$150,500	III	
2012	Game On Dude	5	Mike E. Smith	Bob Baffert	Diamond Pride, Lanni Family Trust, Mercedes Stable & Bernie Schiappa	1 1/8 miles	1:52.27	$242,500	III	
Native Diver Handicap
2011	Kettle Corn	4	Garrett K. Gomez	John W. Sadler	C R K Stable	1 1/8 miles	1:49.03	$100,000	III	
2010	Aggie Engineer	5	Joseph Talamo	Patrick Gallagher	Ward and Roberta Williford	1 1/8 miles	1:51.04	$100,000	III	
2009	Mast Track	5	Rafael Bejarano	Humberto Ascanio	Stronach Stables	1 1/8 miles	1:50.53	$100,000	III	
2008	Slew's Tizzy	4	Joel Rosario	Doug F. O'Neill	Joseph Lacombe Stable	1 1/8 miles	1:46.78	$108,200	III	
2007	Heatseeker (IRE)	4	Michael C. Baze	Jerry Hollendorfer	William Deburgh	1 1/8 miles	1:47.23	$111,800	III	
2006	Saint Stephen	6	Garrett K. Gomez	Christophe Clement	Charles E. & Susan T. Harris & Susan Karches	1 1/8 miles	1:48.71	$100,000	III	
2005	Trotamondo (CHI)	4	Garrett K. Gomez	Laura de Seroux	A-Mark Racing, Bogtufi, Bridport, S. A., Liliana Solari	1 1/8 miles	1:49.92	$100,000	III	
2004	Truly a Judge	6	Martin A. Pedroza	David Bernstein	Alan Aidekman, Gaylord Ailshie & Tom Harris	1 1/8 miles	1:47.06	$100,000	III	
2003	Olmodavor	4	Alex O. Solis	Richard E. Mandella	Wertheimer et Frere	1 1/8 miles	1:49.16	$100,000	III	
2002	Piensa Sonando (CHI)	6	Laffit Pincay Jr.	Ron McAnally	Nelson Bunker Hunt	1 1/8 miles	1:48.43	$100,000	III	
2001	Momentum	3	Corey Nakatani	Craig Dollase	J. Paul Reddam	1 1/8 miles	1:48.24	$100,000	III	
2000	Sky Jack	4	Laffit Pincay Jr.	Doug F. O'Neill	Ren-Mar Thoroughbreds	1 1/8 miles	1:46.81	$100,000	III	
1999	General Challenge	3	Chris McCarron	Bob Baffert	Golden Eagle Farm	1 1/8 miles	1:49.07	$100,000	III	
1998	Puerto Madero (CHI)	4	Kent J. Desormeaux	Richard E. Mandella	Randall D. Hubbard & Dwight Sutherland	1 1/8 miles	1:48.43	$100,000	III	
1997	Refinado Tom (ARG)	4	Gary L. Stevens	Richard E. Mandella	Refinado Tom Inc.	1 1/8 miles	1:47.84	$100,000	III	
1996	Gentlemen (ARG)	4	Gary L. Stevens	Richard E. Mandella	Haras de La Pomme	1 1/8 miles	1:45.35	$106,400	III	
1995	Alphabet Soup	4	Chris Antley	David E. Hofmans	Ridder Thoroughbred Stable	1 1/8 miles	1:47.03	$106,400	III	
1994	Best Pal	6	Chris McCarron	Richard E. Mandella	Golden Eagle Farm	1 1/8 miles	1:48.44	$109,000	III	
1993	Slew of Damascus	5	Corey Nakatani	Craig G. Roberts	Edris Harbeston, George Losh & Vic Naccaroto	1 1/8 miles	1:47.46	$108,300	III	
1992	Sir Beaufort	5	Chris McCarron	Charles E. Whittingham	Victoria Calantoni	1 1/8 miles	1:47.88	$106,700	III	
1991	Twilight Agenda	5	Chris McCarron	D. Wayne Lukas	Moyglare Stud	1 1/8 miles	1:49.00	$103,100	III	
1990	Warcraft	3	Chris McCarron	Charles E. Whittingham	Mary Bradley, Charles E. Whittingham & Nancy Chandler	1 1/8 miles	1:47.40	$108,500	III	
1989	Ruhlmann	4	Chris McCarron	Charles E. Whittingham	Jerome S. Moss	1 1/8 miles	1:48.00	$108,100	III	
1988	Cutlass Reality	6	Gary L. Stevens	Craig Anthony Lewis	Howard Crash & Jim Hankoff	1 1/8 miles	1:48.60	$114,100	III	
1987	Epidaurus	5	Pat Valenzuela	Charles E. Whittingham	Elizabeth A. Keck	1 1/8 miles	1:47.60	$159,200	III	
1986	Hopeful Word	5	Laffit Pincay Jr.	Richard E. Mandella	James Clifton, Robert Doll, Barrett Morris	1 1/8 miles	1:47.80	$153,800	III	
1985	Innamorato	4	Sandy Hawley	Jay M. Robbins	Fred Duckett & Paniolo Ranch	1 mile	1:33.40	$143,900	III	
1984	Lord At War (ARG)	4	Bill Shoemaker	Charles E. Whittingham	Peter & Diane Perkins	1 mile	1:35.40	$121,925	III	
1983	Menswear	5	Fernando Toro	Richard E. Mandella	Sam Bretzfield & Hal Oliver	1 1/16 miles	1:42.40	$108,200	III	
1982	Native Tactics	4	Eddie Delahoussaye	Neil D. Drysdale	Saron Stable	1 1/16 miles	1:35.40	$107,700	III	
1981	Syncopate	6	Chris McCarron	Ron McAnally	Elmendorf Farm	1 mile	1:38.80	$108,500	III	
1980	Replant	6	Bill Shoemaker	Ron McAnally	Elmendorf Farm	1 mile	1:34.20	$108,000	III	
1979	Life's Hope	6	Laffit Pincay Jr.	Laz Barrera	Harbor View Farm	1 mile	1:35.00	$54,000	II	

Legend:
All Weather Track Dirt

== See also ==
- List of American and Canadian Graded races
