= Seabiscuit Handicap =

- Class: Grade II
- Location: Del Mar Racetrack; Del Mar, California, United States
- Inaugurated: 1977 (as Citation Handicap at Hollywood Park Racetrack)
- Race type: Thoroughbred - Flat racing
- Website: Del Mar

Race information
- Distance: 1 1/16 miles
- Surface: Turf
- Track: Left-handed
- Qualification: Three-year-olds and older
- Weight: Assigned
- Purse: $200,000 (since 2023)

The Seabiscuit Handicap is a Grade II American Thoroughbred horse race for three-years-old and older over a distance of one and one-sixteenth miles (8 1/2 furlongs) on the turf track scheduled annually in late November at Del Mar Racetrack in Del Mar, California. The event currently carries a purse of $200,000.

== History ==
The inaugural running of the event was on 17 July 1977 as the Citation Handicap at Hollywood Park Racetrack in Inglewood, California over a distance of 1 1/16 miles on the dirt track. The event was named after the eighth winner of the American Triple Crown in 1948, Citation. Citation had won the Hollywood Gold Cup at the Hollywood Park Racetrack in last victory of his career.

In 1979 for the third running of the event, American Graded Stakes Committee classified the event as Grade III.

In 1980 the event was run over a mile and was won by the Irish-bred Caro Bambino who equalled the course record set by Swaps in 1956. In 1991 the event was downgraded and moved to the Hollywood Park autumn meeting and run at a distance of 1 1/8 miles.

In 1983 the event was scheduled on the turf track over a distance of 1 1/8 miles and was split into two divisions. The event also was run in split divisions in 1991.

In 1984 the event was upgraded back to Grade III but due to the unexpected wet weather the race was run on the dirt track which was rated as sloppy. US Hall of Fame jockey Bill Shoemaker teamed up with US Hall of Fame trainer Charles E. Whittingham to easily win on the Argentine-bred Lord At War by three lengths in a slow time of 1:50 3/5.

In 1987 the event was upgraded once more to Grade II and once again Charles E. Whittingham would train an Argentine-bred Forlitano to victory. Forlitano would win again in 1988.

In 1999 the distance of the event was decrease to back to the original 1 1/16 miles. In 2004 the event was upgraded to the highest classification of Grade I.

The race was not run in 2005 due to problems with Hollywood Park's grass course not being ready after the turf course was reseeded.

The event was downgraded back to Grade II for the 2010 renewal.

With the closure of Hollywood Park Racetrack in 2013 the event was moved to Del Mar Racetrack. With the relocation of the event the Del Mar Administration renamed the event to the Seabiscuit Handicap in honor of the 1938 US Horse of the Year, Seabiscuit as set by Daily Racing Form and Turf & Sport Digest Awards.

== Records ==
Speed record:

- 1 1/16 miles: 1:39.67 – Ashkal Way (2006)
- 1 1/8 miles: 1:44.78 – Fastness (IRE) (1995)

Margins:

- 3 1/2 lengths – Al Mamoon (1986)

Most wins:

- 2 - Forlitano (ARG) (1987, 1988)
- 2 - Good Journey (2001, 2002)

Most wins by a jockey:

- 4 - Garrett K. Gomez (1998, 2006, 2011, 2012)

Most wins by a trainer:

- 5 - Philip D'Amato (2015, 2017, 2020, 2022, 2023)

Most wins by an owner :

- 3 - Evergreen Farm (1987, 1988, 1995)

== Winners ==
Year	Winner	Age	Jockey	Trainer	Owner	Distance	Time	Purse	Grade	Ref
At Del Mar – Seabiscuit Handicap
2025	Call Sign Seven	4	Ricardo Gonzalez	Michael W. McCarthy	Savio-Cannon Thoroughbreds	1 1/16 miles	1:41.71	$201,500	II	
2024	Mi Hermano Ramon	4	Hector I. Berrios	Mark Glatt	Red Baron's Barn & Rancho Temescal	1 1/16 miles	1:41.07	$203,500	II	
2023	Easter (FR)	5	Antonio Fresu	Philip D'Amato	Madaket Stables	1 1/16 miles	1:39.96	$201,500	II	
2022	Hong Kong Harry (IRE)	5	Flavien Prat	Philip D'Amato	Scott Anastasi, Jimmy Ukegawa & Tony Valazza	1 1/16 miles	1:39.79	$251,500	II	
2021	Field Pass	4	Umberto Rispoli	Michael Maker	Three Diamonds Farm	1 1/16 miles	1:41.85	$251,000	II	
2020	Count Again	4	Juan J. Hernandez	Philip D'Amato	Agave Racing Stable & Sam-Son Farm	1 1/16 miles	1:40.84	$203,500	II	
2019	Next Shares	6	Jose Valdivia Jr.	Richard Baltas	Debby & Richard Baltas, Christopher T. Dunn, Jules & Michael Iavarone, Jerry McClanahan, Ritchie Robershaw & Mark Taylor	1 1/16 miles	1:42.00	$201,404	II	
2018	Caribou Club	4	Joseph Talamo	Thomas F. Proctor	Glen Hill Farm	1 1/16 miles	1:41.38	$202,415	II	
2017	Hunt (IRE)	5	Flavien Prat	Philip D'Amato	Michael House	1 1/16 miles	1:41.03	$200,345	II	
2016	Ring Weekend	5	Drayden Van Dyke	H. Graham Motion	St Elias Stable & West Point Thoroughbreds	1 1/16 miles	1:42.29	$201,035	II	
2015	Midnight Storm	4	Victor Espinoza	Philip D'Amato	Dye, Marjorie Post, A Venneri Racing & Little Red Feather Racing	1 1/16 miles	1:42.70	$251,000	II	
2014	Kaigun	4	Corey Nakatani	Mark E. Casse	Quintessential Racing, Horse'n Around Racing Stable & Gary Barber	1 1/16 miles	1:41.38	$250,750	II	
At Hollywood Park – Citation Handicap
2013	Silentio	4	Rafael Bejarano	Gary Mandella	Wertheimer et Frère	1 1/16 miles	1:40.66	$250,500	II	
2012	Data Link	4	Garrett K. Gomez	Claude R. McGaughey III	Stuart S. Janney III	1 1/16 miles	1:41.00	$250,000	II	
2011	Jeranimo	5	Garrett K. Gomez	Michael Pender	Robert J. Wright	1 1/16 miles	1:40.87	$250,000	II	
2010	Victor's Cry	5	Victor Espinoza	Eoin G. Harty	Equilete Stable	1 1/16 miles	1:39.86	$250,000	II	
2009	Fluke (BRZ)	4	Joseph Talamo	Humberto Ascanio	Patricia Bozano	1 1/16 miles	1:40.48	$300,000	I	
2008	Hyperbaric	5	Tyler Baze	Julio C. Canani	Prestonwood Racing	1 1/16 miles	1:41.29	$400,000	I	
2007	Lang Field	4	Jon Court	Art Sherman	Nigel R. Shields	1 1/16 miles	1:39.72	$400,000	I	
2006	Ashkal Way (IRE)	4	Garrett K. Gomez	Saeed bin Suroor	Godolphin Racing	1 1/16 miles	1:39.67	$400,000	I	
2005	Race not held									
2004	Leroidesanimaux (BRZ)	4	Jon Court	Robert J. Frankel	TNT Stud	1 1/16 miles	1:41.36	$400,000	I	
2003	Redattore (BRZ)	8	Julie Krone	Richard E. Mandella	Dr. Luis Alfredo Tannay	1 1/16 miles	1:40.74	$400,000	II	
2002	Good Journey	6	Pat Day	Wallace Dollase	Flaxman Holdings, Gary Margolis, Michael Jarvis & Partners	1 1/16 miles	1:41.45	$500,000	II	
2001	§ Good Journey	5	Chris McCarron	Wallace Dollase	Flaxman Holdings, Gary Margolis, Michael Jarvis & Partners	1 1/16 miles	1:44.30	$500,000	II	
2000	Charge d'Affaires (GB)	5	Jose A. Santos	Christophe Clement	La Marquise Soledad de Moratalla	1 1/16 miles	1:40.30	$500,000	II	
1999	Brave Act (GB)	5	Alex O. Solis	Ron McAnally	Sidney Craig	1 1/16 miles	1:39.69	$500,000	II	
1998	Military	4	Garrett K. Gomez	Wallace Dollase	The Thoroughbred Corporation, Glencrest Farm & Green Lantern Stable	1 1/8 miles	1:50.58	$300,000	II	
1997	Geri	5	Jerry D. Bailey	William I. Mott	Allen E. Paulson	1 1/8 miles	1:48.35	$300,000	II	
1996	Gentlemen (ARG)	4	Gary L. Stevens	Richard E. Mandella	Haras de la Pomme	1 1/8 miles	1:45.55	$300,000	II	
1995	Fastness (IRE)	5	Gary L. Stevens	Jenine Sahadi	Evergreen Farm	1 1/8 miles	1:44.78	$300,000	II	
1994	§ Southern Wish	5	Corey Nakatani	Wallace Dollase	Richard Stephen	1 1/4 miles	2:00.20	$250,000	II	
1993	Jeune Homme	3	Thierry Jarnet	Francois Boutin	Yoshio Asakawa	1 1/8 miles	1:45.84	$250,000	II	
1992	Leger Cat (ARG)	6	Corey Nakatani	Richard E. Mandella	Edward C. Allred & Randall D. Hubbard	1 1/8 miles	1:46.48	$250,000	II	
1991	Notorious Pleasure	5	Laffit Pincay Jr.	Darrell Vienna	Robert, Karen, Marc, Mike & Rich Levey	1 1/8 miles	1:45.80	$170,100	II	Division 1
1991	Fly Till Dawn	5	Laffit Pincay Jr.	Darrell Vienna	Josephine T. Gleis	1 1/8 miles	1:45.86	$170,100	II	Division 2
1990	Colway Rally (GB)	6	Corey Black	Julio C. Canani	Clover Racing Stable, Alexander Brittan et al.	1 1/8 miles	1:47.80	$107,300	II	
1989	Fair Judgment	5	Eddie Delahoussaye	Richard C. Mettee	Tomonori Tsurumaki	1 1/8 miles	1:50.00	$108,300	II	
1988	Forlitano (ARG)	7	Pat Valenzuela	Charles E. Whittingham	Evergreen Farm	1 1/8 miles	1:46.60	$119,600	II	
1987	Forlitano (ARG)	6	Pat Valenzuela	Charles E. Whittingham	Evergreen Farm	1 1/8 miles	1:47.40	$134,500	II	
1986	Al Mamoon	5	Gary L. Stevens	Robert J. Frankel	Edmund A. Gann & Bertram Firestone	1 1/8 miles	1:48.00	$195,700	III	
1985	Zoffany	5	Eddie Delahoussaye	John Gosden	Anthony & John Bodie, Anthony Speelman	1 1/8 miles	1:44.80	$118,600	III	
1984	Lord At War (ARG)	4	Bill Shoemaker	Charles E. Whittingham	Mrs. Diane Perkins	1 1/8 miles	1:50.60	$163,300	III	Off turf
1983	Beldale Lustre	4	Chris McCarron	John Gosden	William A. Bailey	1 1/8 miles	1:49.40	$86,750		Division 1
1983	Pewter Grey	4	Ray Sibille	Ron McAnally	Tadahiro Hotehama	1 1/8 miles	1:49.60	$87,250		Division 2
1982	Caterman (NZ)	6	Chris McCarron	Louis R. Carno	Mr. & Mrs. Tom Cavanagh	1 1/16 miles	1:41.00	$80,450		
1981	Tahitian King (IRE)	5	Bill Shoemaker	Johnny Longden	Johnny Longden & Carr Stable	1 1/8 miles	1:48.80	$226,000		
1980	Caro Bambino (IRE)	5	Pat Valenzuela	Charles E. Whittingham	Mary Jones Bradley	1 mile	1:33.20	$63,950	III	
1979	Text	5	Bill Shoemaker	Vincent Clyne	Elmendorf Farm	1 1/16 miles	1:40.40	$108,600	III	
1978	Effervescing	5	Laffit Pincay Jr.	D. Wayne Lukas	Mel Hatley & Albert Yank	1 1/16 miles	1:40.20	$107,700		
1977	Painted Wagon	4	Chuck Baltazar	Marvin G. Williams	Silver Creek Ranch	1 1/16 miles	1:41.00	$82,350		

Legend:
Dirt Turf

Notes:
§ Ran as an entry

== See also ==
List of American and Canadian Graded races
