= Boldnesian =

American-bred Thoroughbred racehorse

- Sire: Bold Ruler
- Grandsire: Nasrullah
- Dam: Alanesian
- Damsire: Polynesian
- Sex: Stallion
- Foaled: 1963
- Country: United States
- Colour: Bay
- Breeder: William Haggin Perry
- Owner: William Haggin Perry
- Trainer: James W. Maloney
- Record: 5: 4–0–0
- Earnings: US$107,625

Major wins
- Santa Anita Derby (1966)

Boldnesian (1963–1975) was an American Thoroughbred racehorse and sire.

== Racing career ==
In early 1966 Boldnesian won the Santa Anita Derby. He was scheduled to run in the Kentucky Derby, but his racing career was cut short by an operation after bone chips were discovered following his win at Santa Anita Park.

== Stud record ==
At stud, Boldnesian notably sired Canadian Horse Racing Hall of Fame inductee Bold Ruckus and Bold Reasoning who in turn sired the 1977 U.S. Triple Crown winner Seattle Slew.

== Pedigree ==
Pedigree of Boldnesian, bay stallion, 1963
Sire Bold Ruler	Nasrullah	Nearco	Pharos
Sire Bold Ruler	Nasrullah	Nearco	Nogara
Sire Bold Ruler	Nasrullah	Mumtaz Begum	Blenheim
Sire Bold Ruler	Nasrullah	Mumtaz Begum	Mumtaz Mahal
Sire Bold Ruler	Miss Disco	Discovery	Display
Sire Bold Ruler	Miss Disco	Discovery	Ariadne
Sire Bold Ruler	Miss Disco	Outdone	Pompey
Sire Bold Ruler	Miss Disco	Outdone	Sweep Out
Dam Alanesian	Polynesian	Unbreakable	Sickle
Dam Alanesian	Polynesian	Unbreakable	Blue Grass
Dam Alanesian	Polynesian	Black Polly	Polymelian
Dam Alanesian	Polynesian	Black Polly	Black Queen
Dam Alanesian	Alablue	Blue Larkspur	Black Servant
Dam Alanesian	Alablue	Blue Larkspur	Blossom Time
Dam Alanesian	Alablue	Double Time	Sir Gallahad
Dam Alanesian	Alablue	Double Time	Virginia L (family: 4-m)
