= William Haggin Perry =

- Born: December 5, 1910; New York City, New York
- Died: November 12, 1993 (aged 82); Oakwood, Virginia
- Education: St. George's School, Yale University
- Occupations: Racehorse owner & breeder
- Board member of: Breeders' Cup Ltd.
- Spouse: Nicole Hawes
- Children: William Haggin Perry Jr.
- Parent(s): Henry Pierrepont Perry & Edith Lounsbery
- Relatives: James Ben Ali Haggin (grandfather); Richard Pierrepont Perry (brother); Richard Lounsbery
- Awards: Virginia Thoroughbred Association Hall of Fame (1994)

William Haggin Perry (December 5, 1910 - November 12, 1993) was an American owner and breeder of thoroughbred racehorses.

== Early life ==
Perry was the son of Henry Pierrepont Perry, a Wall Street stockbroker, and Edith Lounsbery, who was the daughter of Richard P. Lounsbery and Edith Hunter Haggin who in turn was the daughter of one of America's most prominent horsemen, James Ben Ali Haggin. The Ben Ali Haggin family were the descendants of Ibrahim Ben Ali, who was one of the first Turkish settlers to the United States.

Although born in New York City, Perry spent a good deal of his childhood at Rancho Del Paso, the huge Haggin family ranch in Sacramento County, California. The family owned a summer estate in Newport, Rhode Island, and young Perry studied there at St. George's School before going on to Yale University.

== Racing ==
In 1960, through his Gamely Corporation, Perry entered into an annual foal sharing partnership with Arthur Hancock of Claiborne Farm. Perry raced many top runners including 1979 Belmont Stakes winner Coastal. His early success in racing came with the filly Alanesian who in turn produced Boldnesian and Princessnesian. Perry's first Champion was Lamb Chop in 1963, followed by U.S. Racing Hall of Fame inductee Gamely in 1967, and Revidere in 1976.

== Personal life ==
Perry and his wife Nicole made their home at Waterford Farm, a 144-acre equestrian estate in Buchanan County, Virginia, about four miles from the village of Middleburg. According to Armfield, Miller & Ripley Fine Properties, LLC, real estate agents who sold the property, The Chronicle of the Horse publication called Waterford Farm "one of the ten most important thoroughbred facilities in the United States during the late 1970s and early 80s."

== Death ==
In 1993, William Haggin Perry died at Waterford Farm at age eighty-five. He was inducted posthumously in the Virginia Thoroughbred Association Hall of Fame in 1994.
