= Princessnesian =

American-bred Thoroughbred racehorse

- Sire: Princequillo
- Grandsire: Prince Rose
- Dam: Alanesian
- Damsire: Polynesian
- Sex: Mare
- Foaled: 1964
- Country: United States
- Colour: Bay
- Breeder: William Haggin Perry
- Owner: William Haggin Perry
- Trainer: James W. Maloney
- Record: 36: 11-5-6
- Earnings: US$332,035

Major wins
- Hollywood Gold Cup (1968); Milady Handicap (1968); Hollypark Ladies Handicap (1968); Santa Barbara Handicap (1968); Santa Margarita Invitational Handicap (1969)

Princessnesian (foaled in 1964 in Kentucky) was an American Thoroughbred racehorse.

== Background ==
Princessnesian was a bay mare bred and raced by William Haggin Perry.

== Racing career ==
In 1968 the four-year-old mare became only the third female to win the Gold Cup, joining Happy Issue (1944) and Two Lea (1952).

== Breeding record ==
Retired to broodmare service, Princessnesian was bred to prominent stallions including Buckpasser, Bold Ruler, Hail To Reason, Hoist The Flag, and Nijinsky. None of her foals achieved anything more than modest success in racing but her daughter Bold Enchantress produced the Group 1 winner Fordham.

== Pedigree ==
Pedigree of Princessnesian
Sire Princequillo	Prince Rose	Rose Prince	Prince Palatine
Sire Princequillo	Prince Rose	Rose Prince	Eglantine
Sire Princequillo	Prince Rose	Indolence	Gay Crusader
Sire Princequillo	Prince Rose	Indolence	Barrier
Sire Princequillo	Cosquilla	Papyrus	Tracery
Sire Princequillo	Cosquilla	Papyrus	Miss Matty
Sire Princequillo	Cosquilla	Quick Thought	White Eagle
Sire Princequillo	Cosquilla	Quick Thought	Mindful
Dam Alanesian	Polynesian	Unbreakable	Sickle
Dam Alanesian	Polynesian	Unbreakable	Blue Grass
Dam Alanesian	Polynesian	Black Polly	Polymelian
Dam Alanesian	Polynesian	Black Polly	Black Queen
Dam Alanesian	Alablue	Blue Larkspur	Black Servant
Dam Alanesian	Alablue	Blue Larkspur	Blossom Time
Dam Alanesian	Alablue	Double Time	Sir Gallahad III
Dam Alanesian	Alablue	Double Time	Virginia L
