= Colorado King =

South African-bred Thoroughbred racehorse

- Sire: Grand Rapids
- Grandsire: Machiero
- Dam: Courageous
- Damsire: Fairthorn
- Sex: Stallion
- Foaled: 1959
- Country: South Africa
- Colour: Chestnut
- Breeder: Birch Bros.
- Owner: P.S. Louw (SA); Poltex Stable (USA)
- Trainer: Sydney C. Laird (SA); Wally Dunn (USA)
- Record: 41: 17-3-7
- Earnings: R64 590 (SA) + $251,825 (US)

Major wins
- Cape of Good Hope Nursery (1962); Stewards Juvenile Handicap (1962); African Breeders Plate (1962); Guineas Trial Stakes (1963); Cape of Good Hope Derby Stakes (1963); Cape of Good Hope Guineas (1963); Clairwood June Handicap (1963); Durban July Handicap (1963); Sunset Handicap (1964); American Handicap (1964); Hollywood Gold Cup (1964)

Awards
- Champion Two Year Old South Africa (1961/62); Champion Three Year Old South Africa (1962/63); Horse of the Year South Africa (1962/63)

Honours
- Colorado King Stakes Grade 2

Colorado King (foaled 1959) was a South African Thoroughbred racehorse who also competed successfully in the United States. He was Champion Two Year Old (1961/62) and Three Year Old (1962/63) in South Africa, before being sold to race in the United States.

Conditioned in South Africa by trainer Sydney C. Laird, Colorado King won ten races in including the Cape Guineas, Cape Derby and the Durban July Handicap. Sold to an American racing partnership led by William R. (Fritz) Hawn, he raced under the Poltex Stable banner in California. There, under trainer Wally Dunn, Colorado King won six races in 1964 including the Hollywood Gold Cup in which he defeated Native Diver, the American Handicap where he equalled the world record for 9 furlongs and the Sunset Handicap at a mile and five-eighths by seven lengths. In 1965 he won only once in nine starts before being retired to stud where he met with limited success as a sire.

Racing Record
Age	Starts	Wins	2nds	3rds
At 2	7	4	3	0
At 3	8	6	0	1
At 5	17	6	0	3
At 6	9	1	0	2
	41	17	3	7
