= Alanesian =

American-bred Thoroughbred racehorse

- Sire: Polynesian
- Grandsire: Unbreakable
- Dam: Alablue
- Damsire: Blue Larkspur
- Sex: Mare
- Foaled: 1954
- Country: United States
- Colour: Bay
- Breeder: E. Barry Ryan
- Owner: William Haggin Perry
- Trainer: James W. Maloney
- Record: 25: 9-6-2
- Earnings: US$136,997

Major wins
- Astarita Stakes (1956); Spinaway Stakes (1956); New Castle Stakes (1958); Margate Handicap (1958)

Alanesian (1954–1977) was an American Thoroughbred racing filly and successful broodmare. She was bred in Kentucky by E. Barry Ryan, a society trainer and owner of Normandy Farm in Lexington, Kentucky. She was purchased privately by William Haggin Perry whose great-grandfather, James Ben Ali Haggin, owned Elmendorf Farm from which Normandy Farm had been formed in 1959.

For William Perry, Alanesian was not only his first highly successful runner whose wins included the now Grade 1 Spinaway Stakes, but who became a foundation mare for his breeding operation that was centered on a foal sharing partnership with Claiborne Farm in Lexington. As a result of this partnership, Alanesian produced Princessnesian, sired by Claiborne's highly influential stallion, Princequillo, and Boldnesian who was sired by Claiborne's preeminent stallion, Bold Ruler. Boldnesian's son, Bold Reasoning, sired 1977 U.S. Triple Crown champion, Seattle Slew. As well, Alanesian's daughter Quillesian was the dam of Revidere, William Perry's 1976 American Champion Three-Year-Old Filly.

== Pedigree ==
Pedigree of Alanesian
Sire Polynesian	Unbreakable	Sickle	Phalaris
Sire Polynesian	Unbreakable	Sickle	Selene
Sire Polynesian	Unbreakable	Blue Grass	Prince Palatine
Sire Polynesian	Unbreakable	Blue Grass	Hour Glass
Sire Polynesian	Black Polly	Polymelian	Polymelus
Sire Polynesian	Black Polly	Polymelian	Pasquita
Sire Polynesian	Black Polly	Black Queen	Pompey
Sire Polynesian	Black Polly	Black Queen	Black Maria
Dam Alablue	Blue Larkspur	Black Servant	Black Toney
Dam Alablue	Blue Larkspur	Black Servant	Padula
Dam Alablue	Blue Larkspur	Blossom Time	North Star
Dam Alablue	Blue Larkspur	Blossom Time	Vaila
Dam Alablue	Double Time	Sir Gallahad III	Teddy
Dam Alablue	Double Time	Sir Gallahad III	Plucky Liege
Dam Alablue	Double Time	Virginia L	McGee
Dam Alablue	Double Time	Virginia L	Sanfara
