= William R. Hawn =

American businessman

- Born: January 13, 1910; Athens, Texas
- Died: December 8, 1995 (aged 85); Dallas, Texas
- Education: Southern Methodist University
- Occupations: Real estate developer, philanthropist, sports team owner, horse racetrack executive, racehorse owner & breeder
- Spouse: 1) Mildred 2) Mary Corzine
- Children: Siblings: Charles, Arthur, Frank, Verne, Jimmy
- Parent(s): W. A. & Edna Hawn
- Awards: Horsemen's Benevolent and Protective Association Hall of Fame (1988)

William Russell "Fritz" Hawn (January 13, 1910 – December 8, 1995) was an American businessman and philanthropist who bred and raced Thoroughbred horses, served for twenty years as president of Del Mar Racetrack, owned by lifelong friend Clint Murchinson with whom he became a founding partner in the Dallas Cowboys franchise of the National Football League. He sold his interest in the Dallas Cowboys in 1984.

A native of Athens, Texas, while a student at Southern Methodist University, William Hawn was part of the football team from 1930 through 1932. He served with the United States military during World War II.

In 1962, William Hawn and his wife Mildred established The Hawn Foundation, Inc. with a mandate to provide financial assistance to charitable, educational, scientific and literary institutions.

== Thoroughbred racing ==
In the 1960s Hawn had notable success racing in the United States with the filly Blue Norther (b. 1961). During his career, Hawn bred more than 50 stakes winners and had his greatest success during the middle part of the 1970s with Vigors (b. 1973), a horse he bred which he named for his friend Tim Vigors, founder of Ireland's renowned Coolmore Stud. Hawn also raced horses in Europe, where he won the 1971 Poule d'Essai des Poulains (French 2,000 Guineas) with Zug. In addition to his own horses, Hawn was also a partner in Poltex Stable which raced six stakes winners in the United States, including Colorado King and Terrang.

In 1977, William Hawn acquired Bosque Bonita Farm, a breeding operation near Versailles, Kentucky. He eventually sold the property to William S. Farish III, who renamed it Lane's End Farm.
