= Happy Issue =

American-bred Thoroughbred racehorse

- Sire: Bow To Me
- Grandsire: Épinard
- Dam: Achieve
- Damsire: Insco
- Sex: Mare
- Foaled: 1940
- Country: United States
- Colour: Bay
- Breeder: Herbert M. Woolf
- Owner: Happy Stable (Charles H. Pinon)
- Trainer: Charles H. Pinon
- Record: 157: 27-23-22
- Earnings: US$225,424

Major wins
- Hollywood Gold Cup (1944); Vanity Handicap (1944); Hawthorne Handicap (1944); Clang Handicap (1944); Premiere Handicap (1946); Burlingame Handicap (1947)

Happy Issue (1940–1964) was an American Thoroughbred racehorse who broke the track record for a mile and a quarter on dirt to become the first female horse to win the prestigious Hollywood Gold Cup at Hollywood Park Racetrack in Inglewood, California. Through 2010. only two other females have won the race. Two Lea did it in 1952 and then Princessnesian was the last to accomplish the feat in 1968.

Happy Issue was owned and trained by Charles H. "Frenchy" Pinon who raced her under the nom de course, Happy Stable. On November 18, 1944, the four-year-old won the most important race to that point in her career with a victory in the Vanity Handicap, a mile and one-eighth race for fillies and mares at Hollywood Park Racetrack. On December 17 she set a new Hollywood Park track record of 2:01 4/5 for a mile and a quarter on dirt in becoming the first female to ever win the Hollywood Gold Cup.

Frenchy Pinon raced Happy Issue for nine years after which she was retired to broodmare duty. Her offspring did not meet with success in racing.
