= Gentlemen (horse) =

Argentine-bred Thoroughbred racehorse

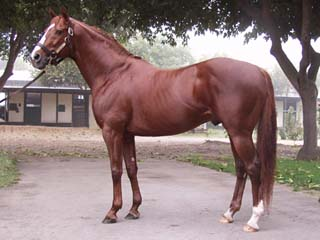
- Gentlemen
- Sire: Robin des Bois
- Grandsire: Nureyev
- Dam: Elegant Glance
- Damsire: Loose Cannon
- Sex: Stallion
- Foaled: 1 October 1992
- Died: 2011 or 2012; Louisiana
- Country: Argentina
- Colour: Chestnut
- Breeder: Haras de la Pomme
- Owner: Randall Dee Hubbard (1996)
- Trainer: Richard Mandella
- Record: 24: 13-4-2
- Earnings: US$3,608,558

Major wins
- Gran Premio Dos Mil Guineas (1995); Gran Premio Nacional (Argentina) (1995); Gran Premio Polla de Potrillos (1995); Bay Meadows Breeders' Cup Handicap (1996); Native Diver Handicap (1996); Citation Handicap (1996); Pimlico Special (1997); Hollywood Gold Cup (1997); Pacific Classic Stakes (1997); San Antonio Handicap (1997 & 1998)

Awards
- Argentine Champion 3-Yr-Old Colt (1995); Timeform rating: 136; Beyer Speed Figure: 126
- Last updated on December 18, 2006

Gentlemen (foaled 1992) was an Argentine Thoroughbred racehorse. He was the Champion Three-Year-Old Colt in Argentina and then raced successfully in the United States.

== Background ==
Gentlemen was a chestnut horse bred at the Haras de la Pomme in Argentina. He was sired by Robin des Bois, an American-bred, French-trained son of Nureyev.

== Racing career ==
Racing at age three in 1995, Gentlemen won the Gran Premio Dos Mil Guineas, Gran Premio Nacional (Argentine Derby), and Gran Premio Polla de Potrillos (Argentine 2000 Guineas). He also finished 4th in the Gran Premio Jockey Club.

Gentlemen was brought to race in the United States in 1996, under California trainer Richard Mandella. Although he was ineligible for the Breeders' Cup, Gentlemen met with considerable success.

Gentlemen's first start in United States was a dirt allowance race at Hollywood Park in which he finished last after leading down the backstretch. He won his next start, a turf allowance at Del Mar. Later that year, he won the Grade 3 Native Diver Handicap by nine lengths in track record time.

In 1997, he was arguably the best racehorse in North America. On May 10, he captured the Grade 1 Pimlico Special at Pimlico Race Course in Baltimore, Maryland conceding three pounds to Skip Away. In June he won the Grade 1 Hollywood Gold Cup by four lengths from the Brazilian champion Siphon with the future Arlington Million winner Marlin a further five and a quarter lengths back in fourth. In August he won the Grade 1 Pacific Classic Stakes at Del Mar, beating Siphon by two and three quarter lengths. He was less successful as a six-year-old in 1998, producing his best performance when winning the San Antonio Handicap and finishing second to Wagon Limit in the Grade 1 Jockey Club Gold Cup.

In 1998 he was entered into the Classic at the Breeders' Cup at Churchill Downs with Richard Mandella as trainer, though Gentlemen eased and finished last. He was retired to stand at stud.

== Racing statistics ==
Gentlemen's Career Statistics
Date	Distance	Surface	Race	Grade	Track	Odds	Time	Finish	Margin	Jockey
10 June 1995	1600 meters	Turf	Premio Don Juan	Maiden	Hipódromo de San Isidro	10.40	1:35.61	2	(1 length)	Jorge Valdivieso
26 June 1996	1600 meters	Turf	Premio Prohibida Oca	Maiden	Hipódromo de San Isidro	1.70	1:35.09	1	9 lengths	Jorge Valdivieso
5 August 1995	1600 meters	Turf	Gran Premio Dos Mil Guineas	G1	Hipódromo de San Isidro	8.00	1:32.36	1	1/2 neck	Jacinto Rafael Herrera
9 September 1995	1600 meters	Dirt	Gran Premio Polla de Potrillos	G1	Hipódromo Argentino de Palermo	7.90	1:34.48	1	2 1/2 lengths	Jacinto Rafael Herrera
7 October 1995	2000 meters	Turf	Gran Premio Jockey Club	G1	Hipódromo de San Isidro	1.80	1:58.61	4	(5 lengths)	Jacinto Rafael Herrera
4 November 1995	2500 meters	Dirt	Gran Premio Nacional	G1	Hipódromo Argentino de Palermo	6.10	2:36.10	1	1 1/2 lengths	Jacinto Rafael Herrera
19 June 1996	8.5 furlongs	Dirt	Allowance	Allowance	Hollywood Park Racetrack	1.90	1:41.95	6	( 10 1/4 lengths)	Corey Nakatani
27 July 1996	8.5 furlongs	Turf	Allowance	Allowance	Del Mar Racetrack	2.10	1:42.36	1	1 1/4 lengths	Corey Nakatani
28 September 1996	9 furlongs	Turf	Bay Meadows Handicap	G3	Bay Meadows Racetrack	1.20*	1:45.90	1	5 lengths	Corey Nakatani
30 November 1996	9 furlongs	Turf	Citation Handicap	G2	Hollywood Park Racetrack	2.00*	1:45.55	1	2 1/2 lengths	Gary Stevens
22 December 1996	9 furlongs	Dirt	Native Diver Handicap	G3	Hollywood Park Racetrack	1.40	1:45.35 (NTR)	1	9 lengths	Gary Stevens
2 February 1997	9 furlongs	Dirt	San Antonio Handicap	G2	Santa Anita Park	0.50*	1:47.38	1	3/4 lengths	Gary Stevens
2 March 1997	10 furlongs	Dirt	Santa Anita Handicap	G1	Santa Anita Park	1.70*	2:00.23	3	(3 lengths)	Gary Stevens
10 May 1997	9.5 furlongs	Dirt	Pimlico Special Handicap	G1	Pimlico Race Course	1.80*	1:53.03	1	1/2 lengths	Gary Stevens
29 June 1997	10 furlongs	Dirt	Hollywood Gold Cup Stakes	G1	Hollywood Park Racetrack	1.60	1:59.26	1	4 lengths	Gary Stevens
9 August 1997	10 furlongs	Dirt	Pacific Classic Stakes	G1	Del Mar Racetrack	0.50*	2:00.56	1	2 3/4 lengths	Gary Stevens
20 September 1997	8 furlongs	Turf	Woodbine Mile Stakes	Listed	Woodbine Racetrack	0.45*	1:36.20	5	(2 3/4 lengths)	Gary Stevens
7 February 1998	9 furlongs	Dirt	San Antonio Handicap	G2	Santa Anita Park	0.30*	1:47.60	1	6 lengths	Gary Stevens
7 March 1998	10 furlongs	Dirt	Santa Anita Handicap	G1	Santa Anita Park	0.05*	2:02.26	4	(7 1/2 lengths)	Pat Day
28 June 1998	10 furlongs	Dirt	Hollywood Gold Cup Stakes	G1	Hollywood Park Racetrack	1.70	2:00.16	3	(2 3/4 lengths)	Gary Stevens
15 August 1998	10 furlongs	Dirt	Pacific Classic Stakes	G1	Del Mar Racetrack	1.20*	2:00.29	2	(4 lengths)	Corey Nakatani
19 September 1998	9 furlongs	Dirt	Woodward Stakes	G1	Belmont Park	7.20	1:47.80	2	(1 3/4 lengths)	Corey Nakatani
10 October 1998	10 furlongs	Dirt	Jockey Club Gold Cup	G1	Belmont Park	2.00	2:00.62	2	(5 1/2 lengths)	Corey Nakatani
7 November 1998	10 furlongs	Dirt	Breeders' Cup Classic	G1	Churchill Downs	8.80	2:02.16	DNF	-	Corey Nakatani

== Stud record ==
In 1999, Gentlemen began stud duty at Walmac Farm in Lexington, Kentucky, where he met with modest success. He stood for a stud fee of $15,000 in 2002. In 2005, Gentlemen was relocated to Applebite Farms in California to stand stud for the 2006 season, at a stud fee of $5,000. In late 2007, he was purchased by Elite Stables, LLC and moved to Elite Thoroughbreds in Folsom, Louisiana. His 2008 stud fee was listed at a special introductory fee of $1500.

== Death ==
As of 2025, Gentlemen's death had not been officially reported, however unsubstantiated claims were made in 2020 of his 2011 or 2012 death at a farm in Louisiana.

== Pedigree ==
Pedigree of Gentlemen (ARG), chestnut stallion, foaled Oct 10, 1992
Sire Robin des Bois (USA)	Nureyev (USA)	Northern Dancer (CAN)	Nearctic (CAN)
Sire Robin des Bois (USA)	Nureyev (USA)	Northern Dancer (CAN)	Natalma (USA)
Sire Robin des Bois (USA)	Nureyev (USA)	Special (USA)	Forli (ARG)
Sire Robin des Bois (USA)	Nureyev (USA)	Special (USA)	Thong (USA)
Sire Robin des Bois (USA)	Rare Mint (USA)	Key to the Mint (USA)	Graustark (USA)
Sire Robin des Bois (USA)	Rare Mint (USA)	Key to the Mint (USA)	Key Bridge (USA)
Sire Robin des Bois (USA)	Rare Mint (USA)	Another Treat (USA)	Cornish Prince (USA)
Sire Robin des Bois (USA)	Rare Mint (USA)	Another Treat (USA)	Rare Treat (USA)
Dam Elegant Glance (USA)	Loose Cannon (USA)	Nijinsky (CAN)	Northern Dancer (CAN)
Dam Elegant Glance (USA)	Loose Cannon (USA)	Nijinsky (CAN)	Flaming Page (CAN)
Dam Elegant Glance (USA)	Loose Cannon (USA)	Java Moon (USA)	Graustark (USA)
Dam Elegant Glance (USA)	Loose Cannon (USA)	Java Moon (USA)	Golden Trail (USA)
Dam Elegant Glance (USA)	Hidden Glance (USA)	Gentle Smoke (USA)	Gentle Art (GB)
Dam Elegant Glance (USA)	Hidden Glance (USA)	Gentle Smoke (USA)	Smoke Veil (USA)
Dam Elegant Glance (USA)	Hidden Glance (USA)	Mesmerize (USA)	Francis S. (USA)
Dam Elegant Glance (USA)	Hidden Glance (USA)	Mesmerize (USA)	Any Port (USA)

Gentlemen is inbred 4S × 4D to Graustark, meaning Graustark appears in the fourth generation on both the sire and dam's side of the pedigree. Gentlemen is also inbred to Northern Dancer 3S × 4D.
