= 2016 in equestrianism =

== 2016 Summer Olympics (FEI) ==
- August 7 – 19: 2016 Summer Olympics in (Brazil) Rio de Janeiro at the National Equestrian Center
  - Individual Dressage:
  - (gold) (United Kingdom) Charlotte Dujardin (with horse Valegro)
  - (silver) (Germany) Isabell Werth (with horse Weihegold Old)
  - (bronze) (Germany) Kristina Bröring-Sprehe (with horse Desperados FRH)
  - Team Dressage: (gold) Germany; (silver) Great Britain; (bronze) United States
  - Individual Eventing:
  - (gold) (Germany) Michael Jung (with horse Sam FBW)
  - (silver) (France) Astier Nicolas (with horse Piaf de B'Neville)
  - (bronze) (United States) Phillip Dutton (with horse Mighty Nice)
  - Team Eventing: (gold) France; (silver) Germany; (bronze) Australia
  - Individual Jumping:
  - (gold) (United Kingdom) Nick Skelton (with horse Big Star)
  - (silver) (Sweden) Peder Fredricson (with horse All In)
  - (bronze) (Canada) Eric Lamaze (with horse Fine Lady 5)
  - Team Jumping: (gold) France; (silver) United States; (bronze) Germany

== 2015–16 FEI World Cup Jumping ==
- March 26, 2015 – January 24, 2016: (Australia) Australian League
  - Winner: (Australia) Chris Chugg (with horses Cera Cassiago and Cristalline)
- April 4, 2015 – October 17, 2015: Japan League
  - Winner: (Japan) Tsuyoshi Ueno (with horse Verdi R.)
- April 23, 2015 – September 27, 2015: Central Asian League
  - Note: This league has now been labelled as incomplete by the FEI. Each winner won 26 total points.
  - Winner #1: (Uzbekistan) Umid Kamilov (with horse L'Apechio)
  - Winner #2: (Uzbekistan) Gairat Nazarov (with horse Quatro Junior)
  - Winner #3: (Kyrgyzstan) Rinat Galimov (with horse Charlize)
- April 25, 2015 – October 7, 2015: China League
  - Winner: (China) Zhao Zhiwen (with horse Bolero)
- May 14, 2015 – November 15, 2015: South America South League
  - Winner: (Brazil) Pedro Junqueira Muylaert (with horse Colorado)
- May 14, 2015 – November 29, 2015: (South Africa) South African League
  - Winner: (South Africa) Lisa Williams (with horse Campbell)
- May 14, 2015 – December 13, 2015: Central European League
  - May 14, 2015 – November 29, 2015: Central European League (South Subleague)
    - Winner: (Hungary) Mariann Hugyecz (with horses Chacco Boy and Never Last)
  - June 11, 2015 – December 13, 2015: Central European League (North Subleague)
    - Winner: (Poland) Michal Kazmierczak (with Que Pasa 5)
    - February 25 – 28: Central European League FINAL in (Poland) Warsaw
      - Winner: (Poland) Jaroslaw Skrzyczynski (with horse Crazy Quick)
- June 11, 2015 – November 21, 2015: Caucasian League
  - Note: Two winners won 15 total points each.
  - Winner #1: (Azerbaijan) Rahib Ismayilov (with horse ACO's First Boy)
  - Winner #2: (Georgia (country)) George Kevkhishvili (with horse Raritet)
- August 5, 2015 – February 28, 2016: North American League (East Coast)
  - Winner: (United States) Kent Farrington (with 3 horses)
- August 12, 2015 – February 14, 2016: North American League (West Coast)
  - Winner: (United States) Karl Cook (with horse Tembla)
- September 3, 2015 – February 6, 2016: Arab League
  - Winner: (Saudi Arabia) Abdullah Al-Sharbatly (with 4 horses)
- September 3, 2015 – November 15, 2015: South America North League
  - Winner: (Venezuela) Noel Vanososte (with horse Conrad D)
- October 2, 2015 – November 15, 2015: Southeast Asian League
  - Note: Three winners won 18 total points each.
  - Winner #1: (Thailand) Nattapron Triratanachat (with horse Kalindra)
  - Winner #2: (Thailand) Arinadtha Chavatanont (with horses Apanachi and Looppan)
  - Winner #3: (Thailand) Dhewin Manathanya (with horse Blue Boy T)
- October 15, 2015 – February 7, 2016: Western European League
  - Winner: (Germany) Christian Ahlmann (with 4 horses)
- October 21, 2015 – January 17, 2016: New Zealand League
  - Winner: (New Zealand) Katie Laurie (with horse Breeze)
- March 23 – 28: Longines FEI World Cup Jumping FINAL in (Sweden) Gothenburg
  - Winner: (Switzerland) Steve Guerdat (with horse Corbinian)

== 2015–16 FEI World Cup Dressage ==
- March 26, 2015 – March 28, 2016: 2015–16 FEI World Cup Dressage Schedule
  - March 26, 2015 – December 13, 2015: Asia/Pacific League
    - Werribee #1 winner: (Australia) Mary Hanna (with horse Umbro)
    - Werribee #2 winner: (New Zealand) John Thompson (with horse Bates Antonello)
    - Boneo winner: (Australia) Mary Hanna (with horse Umbro)
    - Sydney winner: (Australia) Mary Hanna (with horse Umbro)
    - Werribee #3 (final) winner: (Australia) Mary Hanna (with horse Umbro)
  - April 23, 2015 – March 6, 2016: North American League
    - Winner: (United States) Steffen Peters (with horse Legolas)
  - April 30, 2015 – October 18, 2015: Central European League
    - Winner: (Russia) Inessa Merkulova (with horse Mister X)
  - October 15, 2015 – March 13, 2016: Western European League
    - Winner: (Germany) Isabell Werth (with horses Weihegold Old and Don Johnson FRH)
- March 23 – 28: Reem Acra FEI World Cup Final (Dressage) in (Sweden) Gothenburg
  - Winner: (Netherlands) Hans Peter Minderhoud (with horse Glock's Flirt)

== 2016 Furusiyya FEI Nations Cup Jumping Series ==
- February 16 – September 25: 2016 Jumping Calendar of Events
  - February 16 – 21: JS #1 in Ocala, Florida
    - Individual winner: (United States) Beezie Madden (with horse Breitling LS)
    - Team winners: The United States (McLain Ward (Rothchild), Lauren Hough (Cornet), Todd Minikus (Babalou), Beezie Madden (Breitling LS))
  - February 17 – 20: JS #2 in (United Arab Emirates) Al Ain
    - Individual winner: (France) Mathieu Billot (with horse Shiva D’Amaury)
    - Team winners: France (Mathieu Billot (Shiva D’Amaury), Frederic David (Equador van’t Roosakker), Julien Gonin (Soleil de Cornu CH), Jerome Hurel (OHM de Ponthual))
  - April 27 – May 1: JS #3 in (Belgium) Lummen
    - Event cancelled, due to adverse weather conditions.
  - April 28 – May 1: JS #4 in Xalapa (Coapexpan)
    - Individual winner: (Mexico) Nicolas Pizarro (with horse Temascaltepec)
    - Team winners: Mexico (Nicolas Pizarro (Temascaltepec), Juan Jose Zendejas Salgado (Tino la Chapelle), Federico Fernández (Guru), Jose Antonio Chedraui Eguia (La Bamba))
  - May 5 – 8: JS #5 in (Austria) Linz-Ebelsberg
    - Individual winner: (Spain) Eduardo Álvarez Aznar (with horse Chatman)
    - Team winners: Poland (Michal Kazmierczak (Que Pasa), Sandra Piwowarczyk-Baluk (Chabento), Jaroslaw Skrzyczynski (Crazy Quick), Krzysztof Ludwiczak (Zoweja))
  - May 12 – 15: JS #6 in (France) La Baule
    - Individual winner: (Netherlands) Wout-Jan van der Schans (with horse Aquila SFN)
    - Team winners: The Netherlands (Wout-Jan van der Schans (Aquila SFN), Leopold van Asten (VDL Groep Zidane N.O.P.), Jur Vrieling (VDL Glasgow VH Merelsnest), Willem Greve (Carambole N.O.P.))
  - May 12 – 15: JS #7 in (Slovenia) Celje
    - Individual winner: (Turkey) Omer Karaevli (with horse Roso au Crosnier)
    - Team winners: Ukraine (Rene Tebbel (Cooper), Oleksandr Onyshchenko (Calcourt Falklund), Ferenc Szentirmai (Chadino), Ulrich Kirchhoff (Gabbiano))
  - May 18 – 22: JS #8 in (Denmark) Odense
    - Individual winner: (Spain) Manuel Añón Suárez (with horse Rackel Chavannaise)
    - Team winners: Ukraine (Cassio Rivetti (Torgal de Virton), Ulrich Kirchhoff (Gabbiano), Ferenc Szentirmai (Zipper), Rene Tebbel (Giljandro van den Bosrand))
  - May 24 – 29: JS #9 in (Portugal) Lisbon
    - Four individual winners:
      - (Spain) Paola Amilibia (with horse Notre Star de la Nutria)
      - (Spain) Eduardo Alvarez Aznar (with horse Fidux)
      - (Portugal) Mario Wilson Fernandes (with horse Saltho de la Roque)
      - (United Kingdom) Tim Wilks (with horse Quelbora Merze)
    - Team winners: Spain (Manuel Fernandez Saro (U Watch), Paola Amilibia (Notre Star de la Nutria), Sergio Álvarez Moya (Arrayan), Eduardo Alvarez Aznar (Fidux))
  - May 26 – 29: JS #10 in (Italy) Rome
    - Four individual winners:
      - (United Kingdom) John Whitaker (with horse Ornellaia)
      - (United States) McLain Ward (with horse HH Azur)
      - (France) Pénélope Leprevost (with horse Vagabond de la Pomme)
      - (Sweden) Malin Baryard-Johnsson (with horse H&M Cue Channa 42)
    - Team winners: Great Britain (Ben Maher (Tic Tac), Jessica Mendoza (Spirit T), Michael Whitaker (Cassionato), John Whitaker (Ornellaia))
  - June 1 – 5: JS #11 in (Canada) Langley, British Columbia
    - Three individual winners:
      - (Canada) Tiffany Foster (with horse Victor)
      - (Republic of Ireland) Daniel Coyle (with horse Tennyson)
      - (Republic of Ireland) Conor Swail (with horse Grafton)
    - Team winners: Mexico (Juan Jose Zendejas Salgado (Tino la Chapelle), Patricio Pasquel (Babel), Francisco Pasquel (Naranjo), Alberto Michán (Gigolo van de Broekkant))
  - June 2 – 5: JS #12 in (Switzerland) St. Gallen
    - Four individual winners:
      - (Republic of Ireland) Greg Patrick Broderick (with horse MHS Going Global)
      - (United States) Lauren Hough (with horse Ohlala)
      - (Germany) Marcus Ehning (with horse Pret à Tout)
      - (Sweden) Peder Fredricson (with horse H&M All In)
    - Team winners: Ireland (Denis Lynch (All Star V), Greg Patrick Broderick (MHS Going Global), Bertram Allen (Molly Malone V), Cian O'Connor (Good Luck))
  - June 9 – 12: JS #13 in (Poland) Sopot
    - Three individual winners:
      - (Austria) Max Kühner (with horse Chardonnay 79)
      - (Ukraine) Cassio Rivetti (with horse Fine Fleur du Marais)
      - (Belgium) Nicola Philippaerts (with horse Bisquet Balou C)
    - Team winners: Ukraine (Cassio Rivetti (Fine Fleur du Marais), Ulrich Kirchhoff (Prince de la Mare), Ferenc Szentirmai (Chadino), Rene Tebbel (Giljandro van den Bosrand))
  - June 22 – 26: JS #14 in Rotterdam
    - Seven individual winners: For results, click here.
    - Team winners: The Netherlands (Harrie Smolders (Emerald N.O.P.), Jur Vrieling (Vdl Zirocco Blue N.O.P.), Willem Greve (Carambole N.O.P.), Maikel van der Vleuten (Vdl Groep Verdi Tn N.O.P.))
  - July 7 – 10: JS #15 in (Sweden) Falsterbo
    - 11 individual winners: For results, click here.
    - Team winners: Switzerland (Janika Sprunger (Bonne Chance CW), Werner Muff (Pollendr), Paul Estermann (Castlefield Eclipse), Romain Duguet (Quorida de Treho))
  - July 14 – 17: JS #16 in Budapest
    - Individual winner: (Hungary) Gabor Szabo Jr. (with horse Timpex Bolcsesz)
    - Team winners: Hungary (Mariann Hugyecz (Chacco Boy), Gabor Szabo Jr. (Timpex Bolcsesz), Balázs Horváth (Zordon), Laszlo Toth (Isti))
  - July 20 – 24: JS #17 in (Republic of Ireland) Dublin
    - Eight individual winners: For results, click here.
    - Team winners: Italy (Piergiorgio Bucci (Casallo Z), Lorenzo de Luca (Ensor de Litrange Lxii), Emilio Bicocchi (Ares), Bruno Chimirri (Tower Mouche))
  - July 28 – 31: JS #18 in (United Kingdom) Hickstead
    - Five individual winners: For results, click here.
    - Team winners: Germany (Meredith Michaels-Beerbaum (Fibonacci 17), Janne Friederike Meyer (Goja 27), Patrick Stühlmeyer (Lacan 2), Ludger Beerbaum (Chiara 222))
  - August 24 – 29: JS #19 in (Spain) Gijón
    - Individual winner: (Canada) Elizabeth Gingras (with horse Zilversprings)
    - Team winners: Great Britain (Tim Stockdale (Fleur de l'Aube), Joe Whitaker (Lola V), Samuel Hutton (Happydam), Robert Bevis (Courtney Z))
  - September 22 – 25: JS #20 (final) in (Spain) Barcelona
    - Four individual winners: Identical to the list of team winners below
    - Team winners: Germany (Christian Ahlmann (Taloubet Z), Marcus Ehning (Pret A Tout), Janne Friederike Meyer (Goja 27), Ludger Beerbaum (Casello))
  - Overall Europe Division 1 winners: The Netherlands
  - Overall Europe Division 2 winners: Ukraine
  - Middle East winners: Qatar
  - Overall North America, Central America & Caribbean winners: Mexico

== 2016 FEI Nations Cup Dressage ==
- March 29 – July 17: 2016 Dressage Calendar of Events
  - March 29 – April 3: NCD #1 in Wellington, Florida
    - Individual winner: (United States) Laura Graves with horse Verdades
    - Team winners: The United States
      - Laura Graves with horse Verdades
      - Shelly Francis with horse Doktor
      - Arlene Page with horse Woodstock
      - Kasey Perry-Glass with horse Goerklintgaards Dublet
  - May 12 – 15: NCD #2 in Odense
    - Individual winner: (Denmark) Catherine Dufour with horse Attergaards Cassidy
    - Team winners: Denmark
      - Catherine Dufour with horse Attergaards Cassidy
      - Agnete Kirk Thinggaard with horse Jojo AZ
      - Daniel Bachmann Andersen with horse Blue Hors Hotline
      - Lisbeth Seierskilde with horse Jonstrupgårdens Raneur
  - May 19 – 22: NCD #3 in (France) Compiègne
    - Individual winner: (United States) Kasey Perry-Glass with horse Goerklintgaards Dublet
    - Team winners: The United States
      - Laura Graves with horse Verdades
      - Shelly Francis with horse Doktor
      - Allison Brock with horse Roosevelt
      - Kasey Perry-Glass with horse Goerklintgaards Dublet
  - June 22 – 26: NCD #4 in Rotterdam
    - Individual winner: (Netherlands) Hans Peter Minderhoud with horse Glock's Johnson TN N.O.P.
    - Team winners: The Netherlands
      - Danielle Heijkoop with horse Siro
      - Adelinde Cornelissen with horse Jerich Parzival
      - Diederik van Silfhout with horse Arlando N.O.P.
      - Hans Peter Minderhoud with horse Glock's Johnson TN N.O.P.
  - July 7 – 10: NCD #5 in Falsterbo
    - Individual winner: (Sweden) Patrik Kittel with horse Delaunay
    - Team winners: Sweden
      - Patrik Kittel with horse Delaunay
      - Jennie Larsson with horse Zircon Spring Flower
      - Rose Mathisen with horse Zuidenwind 1187
  - July 13 – 17: NCD #6 (final) in Aachen
    - Individual winner: (Germany) Isabell Werth with horse Weihegold OLD
    - Team winners: Germany
      - Sonke Rothenberger with horse Cosmo 59
      - Dorothee Schneider with horse Showtime FRH
      - Isabell Werth with horse Weihegold OLD
      - Kristina Bröring-Sprehe with horse Desperados FRH
  - Overall FEI's Nations Cup Dressage champions: The United States (51 points)
  - Second: Sweden (47 points)
  - Third: Denmark (40 points)

== 2016 FEI Nations Cup Eventing ==
- March 23 – October 9: 2016 Eventing Calendar of Events
  - March 23 – 25: NCE #1 in (France) Fontainebleau
    - Individual winner: (Germany) Michael Jung with horse La Biosthetique - Sam FBW
    - Team winners: Germany
      - Michael Jung with horse La Biosthetique - Sam FBW
      - Sandra Auffarth with horse Opgun Louvo
      - Jorg Kurbel with horse Brookfield de Bouncer
      - Andreas Ostholt with horse So Is ET
  - April 22 – 24: NCE #2 in (Republic of Ireland) Ballindenisk (near Watergrasshill)
    - Individual winner: (United Kingdom) Pippa Funnell with horse Mirage d'Elle
    - Team winners: Great Britain
      - Oliver Townend with horse Cooley SRS
      - Franky Reid-Warrilow with horse Dolley Whisper
      - Wills Oakden with horse Merikano
      - Izzy Taylor with horse Briarlands Birdsong
  - May 26 – 29: NCE #3 in (United Kingdom) Houghton Hall (Houghton, Cambridgeshire)
    - Individual winner: (United Kingdom) Nicola Wilson with horse One Two Many
    - Team winners: Germany
      - Josephine Schnauffer with horse Sambuuca
      - Peter Thomsen with horse Horseware's Barney
      - Bettina Hoy with horse Seigneur Medicott
      - Josefa Sommer with horse Hamilton
  - June 24 – 26: NCE #4 in (Poland) Strzegom
    - Individual winner: (Sweden) Ludvig Svennerstål with horse King Bob
    - Team winners: Great Britain
      - Rosalind Canter with horse Allstar B
      - Izzy Taylor with horse KBIS Briarlands Matilda
      - Laura Collett with horse Cooley Again
      - Holly Woodhead with horse Fernhill Facetime
  - July 8 – 10: NCE #5 in The Plains, Virginia
    - Individual winner: (United States) Clark Montgomery with horse Loughan Glen
    - Team winners: The United States
      - Clark Montgomery with horse Loughan Glen
      - Phillip Dutton with horse Fernhill Fugitive
      - Boyd Martin with horse Welcome Shadow
      - Lauren Kieffer with horse Meadowbrook's Scarlett
  - July 14 – 17: NCE #6 in (Germany) Aachen
    - Individual winner: (Germany) Michael Jung with horse Fischertakinou
    - Team winners: Australia
      - Shane Rose with horse CP Qualified
      - Chris Burton with horse Nobilis 18
      - Samantha Birch with horse Hunter Valley ll
      - Sonja Johnson with horse Parkiarrup Illicit Liaison
  - September 16 – 18: NCE #7 in (Italy) Vairano
    - Individual winner: (Germany) Andreas Ostholt with horse Pennsylvania 28
    - Team winners: France
      - François Lemière with horse Ogustin de Terroir
      - Raphael Cochet with horse Sherazad de Louvière
      - Rémi Pillot with horse Tol Chik du Levant
      - Nicolas Mabire with horse Tourmaline du Fief
  - September 22 – 25: NCE #8 in (Belgium) Waregem
    - Individual winner: (Germany) Stephanie Böhe with horse Haytom
    - Team winners: Germany
      - Stephanie Böhe with horse Haytom
      - Leonie Kuhlmann with horse Cascora
      - Franziska Keinki with horse Lancaster 149
      - Andreas Dibowski with horse It's Me XX
  - October 6 – 9: NCE #9 (final) in (Netherlands) Boekelo
    - Individual winner: (Germany) Stephanie Böhe with horse Haytom
    - Team winners: Great Britain
      - Oliver Townend with horse Cooley SRS
      - Izzy Taylor with horse Trevidden
      - Laura Collett with horse Mr Bass
      - Flora Harris with horse Bayano
  - Overall FEI's Nations Cup Eventing champions: Germany (620 points)
  - Second: Great Britain (600 points)
  - Third: France (535 points)

== 2016 Spruce Meadows Jumping Tournaments ==
- June 8 – 12: The National
  - Main event: The RBC Grand Prix presented by Rolex
  - Winner: (Republic of Ireland) Conor Swail (with horse Martha Louise)
- June 15 – 19: The Continental
  - Main event: The CP Grand Prix
  - Winner: (United States) Peter Lutz (with horse Robin de Ponthual)
- June 28 – July 3: The Pan American
  - Main event: The Pan American Cup presented by ROLEX
  - Winner: (United States) Kent Farrington (with horse Gazelle)
- July 6 – 10: The North American
  - Main event: The ATCO Queen Elizabeth II Cup
  - Winner: (United States) Kent Farrington (with horse Gazelle)
- September 7 – 11: The Masters
  - Main event #1: The BMO Nations Cup)
    - Winners: Switzerland
    - Werner Muff (with horse Pollendr)
    - Alain Jufer (with horse Wiveau M)
    - Nadja Peter Steiner (with horse Capuera II)
    - Steve Guerdat (with horse Corbinian)
  - Main event #2: The CP International Grand Prix presented by ROLEX
    - Winner: (United Kingdom) Scott Brash (with horse Ursula XII)

== 2016 Longines Global Champions Tour ==
- April 7 – November 5: 2016 Longines Global Champions Tour Schedule
  - April 7 – 9: LGCT #1 in (United States) Miami Beach, Florida Winner: (Australia) Edwina Tops-Alexander (with horse Lintea Tequila)
  - April 15 – 17: LGCT #2 in Mexico City Winner: (France) Roger-Yves Bost (with horse Qoud'Coeur de la Loge)
  - April 21 – 24: LGCT #3 in (Belgium) Antwerp Winner: (France) Pénélope Leprevost (with horse Flora de Mariposa)
  - April 29 – May 1: LGCT #4 in (China) Shanghai Winner: (Saudi Arabia) Abdullah Al-Sharbatly (with horse Tobalio)
  - May 4 – 7: LGCT #5 in (Germany) Hamburg Winner: (Germany) Ludger Beerbaum (with horse Casello 2)
  - May 19 – 22: LGCT #6 in (Spain) Madrid Winner: (Germany) Marcus Ehning (with horse Pret a Tout)
  - May 26 – 29: LGCT #7 in (France) Chantilly, Oise Winner: (Germany) Ludger Beerbaum (with horse Chiara 222)
  - June 9 – 11: LGCT #8 in (France) Cannes Winner: (United Kingdom) Scott Brash (with horse Hello Forever)
  - June 24 – 26: LGCT #9 in Monaco Winner: (Italy) Emanuele Gaudiano (with horse Caspar 232)
  - July 1 – 3: LGCT #10 in (France) Paris Winner: (Sweden) Rolf-Göran Bengtsson (with horse Casall ASK)
  - July 7 – 9: LGCT #11 in (Portugal) Cascais-Estoril Winner: (Italy) Piergiorgio Bucci (with horse Casallo Z)
  - August 4 – 7: LGCT #12 in (Netherlands) Valkenswaard Winner: (Sweden) Rolf-Göran Bengtsson (with horse Casall ASK)
  - September 8 – 11: LGCT #13 in (Italy) Rome Winner: (Netherlands) Harrie Smolders (with horse Don VHP Z)
  - September 15 – 18: LGCT #14 in (Austria) Vienna Winner: (Germany) Marcus Ehning (with horse Comme il Faut)
  - November 3 – 5: LGCT #15 (final) in (Qatar) Doha Winner: (Sweden) Rolf-Göran Bengtsson (with horse Casall ASK)

== FISU ==
- June 28 – July 2: 2016 World University Equestrian Championships in Flyinge
  - Individual Dressage Test winner: (Denmark) Katja Berg
  - Individual Dressage Freestyle winner: (Denmark) Katja Berg
  - Individual Jumping winner: (Finland) Tuuli Sopanen
  - Team Jumping winners: Sweden (Rebecka Nyhlén, Moa Berrek, Fanny Götesson)
  - Team Dressage winners: Sweden

== Triple Crown of Thoroughbred Racing ==
=== US Triple Crown ===
- May 7: 2016 Kentucky Derby
  - Horse: (United States) Nyquist; Jockey: (Mexico) Mario Gutierrez; Trainer: (United States) Doug O'Neill
- May 21: 2016 Preakness Stakes
  - Horse: (United States) Exaggerator; Jockey: (United States) Kent Desormeaux; Trainer: (United States) J. Keith Desormeaux
- June 11: 2016 Belmont Stakes
  - Horse: (United States) Creator; Jockey: (Puerto Rico) Irad Ortiz Jr.; Trainer: (United States) Steve Asmussen

=== Canadian Triple Crown ===
- July 3: 2016 Queen's Plate
  - Horse: (Canada) Sir Dudley Digges; Jockey: (France) Julien Leparoux; Trainer: (United States) Michael J. Maker
- July 26: 2016 Prince of Wales Stakes
  - Horse: (Canada) Amis Gizmo; Jockey: (Mexico) Luis Contreras; Trainer: (Canada) Josie Carroll
- August 21: 2016 Breeders' Stakes
  - Horse: (Canada) Camp Creek; Jockey: (United States) Rafael Manuel Hernandez; Trainer: (Canada) Rachel Halden

=== UK Triple Crown ===
- April 30: 2016 2000 Guineas Stakes
  - Horse: (United Kingdom) Galileo Gold; Jockey: (Italy) Frankie Dettori; Trainer: (United Kingdom) Hugo Palmer
- June 4: 2016 Epsom Derby
  - Horse: (Republic of Ireland) Harzand; Jockey: (Republic of Ireland) Pat Smullen; Trainer: (Republic of Ireland) Dermot Weld
- September 10: 2016 St Leger Stakes
  - Horse: (United Kingdom) Harbour Law; Jockey: (United Kingdom) George Baker; Trainer: (United Kingdom) Laura Mongan

=== Australian Triple Crown ===
- March 5: 2016 Randwick Guineas
  - Horse: (Australia) Le Romain; Jockey: (Australia) Christian Reith; Trainer: (Australia) Kris Lees
- March 19: 2016 Rosehill Guineas
  - Horse: (New Zealand) Tarzino; Jockey: (Australia) Craig Newitt; Trainer: (Australia) Mick Price
- April 2: 2016 Australian Derby
  - Horse: (New Zealand) Tavago; Jockey: (Australia) Tommy Berry; Trainers: (New Zealand) Trent Busuttin & Natalie Young

=== Hong Kong Triple Crown ===
- January 31: 2016 Hong Kong Stewards' Cup
  - Horse: (United States) Giant Treasure; Jockey: (Belgium) Christophe Soumillon; Trainer: (United Kingdom) Richard Gibson
- February 28: 2016 Hong Kong Gold Cup
  - Horse: (Republic of Ireland) Designs On Rome; Jockey: (Australia) Tommy Berry; Trainer: (Australia) John Moore
- May 22: 2016 Hong Kong Champions & Chater Cup
  - Horse: (United Kingdom) Blazing Speed; Jockey: (Republic of Ireland) Neil Callan; Trainer: (Hong Kong) Anthony S. Cruz
