= 2016 Road to the Kentucky Derby =

The field for the Kentucky Derby is limited each year to 20 horses, with two 'also eligibles' in case of a late withdrawal from the field. To determine eligibility, Churchill Downs developed the Road to the Kentucky Derby, which gives points to the top four finishers in specified races. The 2016 season consists of 34 races, 19 races for the Kentucky Derby Prep Season and 15 races for the Kentucky Derby Championship Season. Earnings in non-restricted stakes act as a tie breaker. Gun Runner finished first in the standings thanks to wins in the Risen Star Stakes and Louisiana Derby, then finished third in the Kentucky Derby. Nyquist, who finished second in the qualification standings, won the Derby.

== Standings ==
Rank	Horse	Points	Earnings (Note: Earnings from non-restricted stakes prior to the running of the Kentucky Derby.)	Trainer	Owner	Ref
1	Gun Runner	151	$849,200	Steven M. Asmussen	Winchell Thoroughbreds LLC & Three Chimneys Farm	
2	**Nyquist**	**130**	**$3,289,000**	**Doug F. O'Neill**	**Reddam Racing LLC**	
3	Exaggerator	126	$1,628,000	Keith Desormeux	Big Chief Racing, LLC, Head of Plains Partners LLC, Rocker O Ranch, LLC et al.	
4	Outwork	120	$660,800	Todd A. Pletcher	Repole Stable	
5	Brody's Cause	114	$1,100,000	Dale L. Romans	Albaugh Family Stable	
6	Creator	110	$690,000	Steven M. Asmussen	WinStar Farm LLC	
7	Lani	100	$1,300,119	Mikio Matsunaga	Yoko Maeda	
8	Mor Spirit	84	$616,800	Bob Baffert	Michael Lund Petersen	
9	Mohaymen	80	$807,750	Kiaran P. McLaughlin	Shadwell Stable	
10	Danzing Candy	60	$290,000	Clifford W. Sise Jr.	Halo Farms, Jim & Dianne Bashor	
11	Destin	51	$338,000	Todd A. Pletcher	Twin Creeks Racing Stables, LLC	
12	Suddenbreakingnews	50	$637,000	Donnie K. Von Hemel	Samuel F. Henderson	
---	Cupid	50	$540,000	Bob Baffert	Michael B. Tabor, Susan Magnier, Derrick Smith	
13	Oscar Nominated (Note: Oscar Nominated was not Triple Crown nominated, so needed to pay a $200,000 supplement to enter)	50	$321,360	Michael J. Maker	Kenneth & Sarah Ramsey	
14	Shagaf	50	$270,000	Chad Brown	Shadwell Stable	
15	Whitmore	44	$400,000	Ron Moquett	Robert V. LaPenta, Harry T. Rosenblum, Southern Springs Stables	
16	Tom's Ready	44	$270,670	Dallas Stewart	G M B Racing (Gayle Benson)	
17	My Man Sam	40	$200,000	Chad Brown	Sheep Pond Partners, Newport Stables LLC, Jay W. Bligh	
18	Majesto	40	$190,000	Gustavo Delgado	Grupo 7C Racing Stable	
19	Trojan Nation	40	$190,000	Paddy Gallagher	Julie Gilbert & Aaron Sones	
---	Polar River	40				
20	Mo Tom	32	$268,326	Thomas M. Amoss	G M B Racing (Gayle Benson)	
---	Fellowship	32	$206,590	Mark Casse	Jacks or Better Farm, Inc. (Fred & Jane Brei)	
---	Adventist	32	$155,000	Leah Gyarmati	Treadway Racing Stable (Jeff Treadway)	
21	Laoban	32	$142,000	Eric Guillot	McCormick Racing LLC & Southern Equine Stable LLC	
---	Dazzling Gem	30	$145,000	Brad Cox	Steve Landers Racing LLC	
---	Uncle Lino	29	$174,000	Eric Guillot	Tom Mansor, Purple Shamrock Racing, Gary Sherlock	
22	Cherry Wine	25	$145,000	Dale L. Romans	William Pacella, Frank L. Jones Jr., Frank Shoop	
---	Sunny Ridge	23				
---	Collected	21				
---	Azar	20				
---	Foreamo	20				
---	Yu Change	20				
---	Zulu	20				
---	Flexibility	15				
---	Greenpointcrusader	14				
---	Swipe	12				
---	Airoforce	10				
---	Cocked and Loaded	10				
---	Discreetness	10				
---	Frank Conversation	10				
---	Matt King Coal	10				
---	Riker	10				
---	Star Hill	10				
---	Surgical Strike	10				
---	Vale Dori	10				
---	Vorticity	8				
---	Kasseopia	6				
---	Rated R Superstar	6				
---	Awesome Speed	5				
---	Candy My Boy	5				
---	Rafting	5				
---	Two Step Time	5				
---	Gordy Florida	4				
---	Let's Meet in Rio	4				
---	One More Round	4				
---	Synchrony	4				
---	Toews On Ice	4				
---	Tusk	4				
---	American Dubai	2				
---	Found Money	2				
---	Gift Box	2				
---	Harlan Punch	2				
---	Holliday Don	2				
---	I Will Score	2				
---	I'malreadythere	2				
---	In Equality	2				
---	Portfolio Manager	2				
---	Sail Ahoy	2				
---	Tizarunner	2				
---	Unbridled Outlaw	2				
---	Uncle Walter	2				
---	Bird of Trey	1				
---	Conquest Big E	1				
---	Conquest Windycity	1				
---	Direct Message	1				
---	Dressed in Hermes	1				
---	Luna de Loco	1				
---	Rare Candy	1				
---	San Dimas	1				
---	Sticksstatelydude	1				
---	Urlacher	1				
---	Van Damme	1				

- Entrants for Kentucky Derby in blue
- "Also eligible" for Kentucky Derby in green
- Sidelined/Inactive/No longer under Derby Consideration/Not Triple Crown nominated in gray
- Winner of Kentucky Derby in **bold**

== Prep season ==
Note: 1st=10 points; 2nd=4 points; 3rd=2 points; 4th=1 point (except the Breeders' Cup Juvenile: 1st=20 points; 2nd=8 points; 3rd=4 points; 4th=2 point)

Race	Distance	Surface	Purse	Track	Date	1st	2nd	3rd	4th	Ref
Iroquois	1-1/16 miles	Dirt	$150,000	Churchill Downs	Sep 12 2015	Cocked and Loaded	Rated R Superstar	Unbridled Outlaw	Conquest Windycity	
FrontRunner	1-1/16 miles	Dirt	$300,000	Santa Anita	Sep 26 201	Nyquist	Swipe	Hollywood Don	Rare Candy	
Champagne	1-mile	Dirt	$300,000	Belmont	Oct 3 2015	Greenpointcrusader	Sunny Ridge	Portfolio Manager	Sail Ahoy	
Breeders' Futurity	1-1/16 miles	Dirt	$400,000	Keeneland	Oct 3 2015	Brody's Cause	Exaggerator	Rated R Superstar	Sticksstatelydude	
Grey Stakes	1-1/16 miles	Synthetic	$150,000	Woodbine	Oct 4 2015	Riker	Kasseopia (GB)	Tizzarunner	Van Damme	
Breeders' Cup Juvenile	1-1/16 miles	Dirt	$2,000,000	Keeneland	Oct 31 2015	Nyquist	Swipe	Brody's Cause	Exaggerator	
Delta Downs Jackpot	1-1/16 miles	Dirt	$1,000,000	Delta Downs	Nov 21 2015	Exaggerator	Sunny Ridge	Harlan Punch	Found Money	
Remsen	1-1/8 miles	Dirt	$300,000	Aqueduct	Nov 28 2015	Mohaymen	Flexibility	Gift Box	Sail Ahoy	
Kentucky Jockey Club	1-1/16 miles	Dirt	$150,000	Churchill Downs	Nov 28 2015	Airoforce	Mor Spirit	Mo Tom	Gun Runner	
Los Alamitos Futurity	1-1/16 miles	Dirt	$500,000	Los Alamitos	Dec 19 2015	Mor Spirit	Toews On Ice	I'malreadythere	Urlacher	
Jerome	1-mile 70 yards	Dirt	$200,000	Aqueduct	Jan 2 2016	Flexibility	Vorticity	In Equality	Bird of Trey	
Sham	1-mile	Dirt	$100,000	Santa Anita	Jan 9 2016	Collected	Let's Meet in Rio	Laoban	Found Money	
Lecomte	1-mile 70 yards	Dirt	$200,000	Fair Grounds	Jan 16 2016	Mo Tom	Tom's Ready	Uncle Walter	Destin	
Smarty Jones	1-mile	Dirt	$150,000	Oaklawn	Jan 18 2016	Discreetness	Gordy Florida	Synchrony	Luna de Loco	
Holy Bull	1-1/16 miles	Dirt	$350,000	Gulfstream	Jan 30 2016	Mohaymen	Greenpointcrusader	Fellowship	Conquest Big E	
Withers	1-1/16 miles	Dirt	$200,000	Aqueduct	Jan 30 2016	Sunny Ridge	Vorticity	Adventist	Flexibility	
Robert B. Lewis	1-1/16 miles	Dirt	$150,000	Santa Anita	Feb 6 2016	Mor Spirit	Uncle Lino	I Will Score	Dressed in Hermes	
El Camino Real Derby	1-1/8 miles	Synthetic	$200,000	Golden Gate	Feb 13 2016	Frank Conversation	Tusk	Kasseopia (GB)	San Dimas	
Southwest	1-1/16 miles	Dirt	$250,000	Oaklawn	Feb 15 2016	Suddenbreakingnews	Whitmore	American Dubai	Collected	

== Championship series ==
=== First leg of series ===
Note: 1st=50 points; 2nd=20 points; 3rd=10 points; 4th=5 points The Sunland Derby was not eligible in 2016 because of quarantine restrictions associated with an outbreak of equine herpesvirus.

Race	Distance	Surface	Purse	Track	Date	1st	2nd	3rd	4th	Ref
Risen Star	1-1/16 miles	Dirt	$400,000	Fair Grounds	Feb 20 2016	Gun Runner	Forevamo	Mo Tom	Candy My Boy	
Fountain of Youth	1-1/16 miles	Dirt	$400,000	Gulfstream	Feb 27 2016	Mohaymen	Zulu	Fellowship	Awesome Speed	
Gotham	1-1/16 miles	Dirt	$500,000	Aqueduct	Mar 5 2016	Shagaf	Laoban	Adventist	Sunny Ridge	
San Felipe	1-1/16 miles	Dirt	$300,000	Santa Anita	Mar 12 2016	Danzing Candy	Mor Spirit	Exaggerator	Uncle Lino	
Tampa Bay Derby	1-1/16 miles	Dirt	$350,000	Tampa Bay Downs	Mar 12 2016	Destin	Outwork	Star Hill	Rafting	
Rebel	1-1/16 miles	Dirt	$700,000	Oaklawn	Mar 19 2016	Cupid	Whitmore	Creator	Cherry Wine	
Spiral	1-1/8 miles	Synthetic	$500,000	Turfway	Apr 2 2016	Oscar Nominated	Azar	Surgical Strike	Two Step Time	
~~Sunland Derby~~ (Note: The Sunland Derby was not eligible in 2016 because of quarantine restrictions associated with an outbreak of equine herpevirus)					n/a					

=== Second leg of series ===
These races are the major preps for the Kentucky Derby, and are thus weighted more heavily. Note: 1st=100 points; 2nd=40 points; 3rd=20 points; 4th=10 points

Race	Distance	Surface	Purse	Track	Date	1st	2nd	3rd	4th	Ref
UAE Derby	~1-3/16 miles	Dirt	$2,000,000	Meydan Racecourse	Mar 26 2016	Lani	Polar River	Yu Change	Vale Dori	
Louisiana Derby	1-1/8 miles	Dirt	$1,000,000	Fair Grounds	Mar 26 2016	Gun Runner	Tom's Ready	Dazzling Gem	Mo Tom	
Florida Derby	1-1/8 miles	Dirt	$1,000,000	Gulfstream	Apr 2 2016	Nyquist	Majesto	Fellowship	Mohaymen	
Wood Memorial	1-1/8 miles	Dirt	$1,000,000	Aqueduct	Apr 9 2016	Outwork	Trojan Nation	Adventist	Matt King Coal	
Blue Grass Stakes	1-1/8 miles	Dirt	$1,000,000	Keeneland	Apr 9 2016	Brody's Cause	My Man Sam	Cherry Wine	Laoban	
Santa Anita Derby	1-1/8 miles	Dirt	$1,000,000	Santa Anita	Apr 9 2016	Exaggerator	Mor Spirit	Uncle Lino	Danzing Candy	
Arkansas Derby	1-1/8 miles	Dirt	$1,000,000	Oaklawn Park	Apr 16 2016	Creator	Suddenbreakingnews	Whitmore	Dazzling Gem	

"Wild Card"

Note: 1st=10 points; 2nd=4 points; 3rd=2 points; 4th=1 point

Race	Distance	Surface	Purse	Track	Date	1st	2nd	3rd	4th	Ref
Lexington	1-1/8 miles	Dirt	$150,000	Keeneland	Apr 16 2016	Collected	One More Round	Synchrony	Direct Message	

== See also ==
- Road to the Kentucky Oaks
