= 2016 Belmont Stakes =

American horse race

148th Belmont Stakes
- Belmont Stakes
- "The Test of the Champion"
- Location: Belmont Park; Elmont, New York, United States
- Date: June 11, 2016
- Distance: 1 1/2 mi (12 furlongs; 2,414 m)
- Winning horse: Creator
- Winning time: 2:28.51
- Final odds: 16.40 (to 1)
- Jockey: Irad Ortiz Jr.
- Trainer: Steven Asmussen
- Owner: WinStar Farm LLC; Bobby Flay
- Conditions: Fast
- Surface: Dirt
- Attendance: 60,114

The 2016 Belmont Stakes was the 148th running of the Belmont Stakes. The 1 1/2-mile (2,400 m) race, known as the "test of the champion", is the final jewel in Thoroughbred horse racing's American Triple Crown series, and was held on June 11, 2016, three weeks after the Preakness Stakes and five weeks after the Kentucky Derby. The race, which had no Triple Crown at stake (as Derby winner Nyquist lost in the Preakness), was broadcast by NBC beginning at 5:00 p.m. EDT, with pre-race coverage on NBCSN starting at 3:00 p.m. The race was won by Creator by a nose over Destin. 2016 Preakness Stakes winner Exaggerator finished eleventh.

The attendance for the event was 60,114.

== Field ==
Only four horses from the 2016 Preakness Stakes came to New York to contest the Belmont: Exaggerator, the Preakness winner; Cherry Wine, the runner-up; Stradivari, who had finished fourth; and Lani, who had finished fifth. Of these, only Exaggerator and Lani had also run in the Kentucky Derby, finishing second and ninth respectively. Nyquist, winner of the 2016 Kentucky Derby and third in the Preakness, missed the Belmont due to illness.

The field also included five horses from the 2016 Kentucky Derby who had not run in the Preakness: Suddenbreakingnews (5th in the Derby), Destin (6th), Brody's Cause (7th), Creator (13th), and Trojan Nation (16th).

The field was rounded out by four "new shooters" — horses who had not run in either of the two preceding Triple Crown races. These were Governor Malibu, Gettysburg, Seeking the Soul, and Forever d'Oro. Governor Malibu was the only stakes winner among these; the rest were long shots. Front-running Gettysburg was entered by his owner, WinStar Farm as a "rabbit", to ensure a decent early pace for their other entry, Creator. To ensure there was no conflict of interest, WinStar also switched Gettysburg's trainer from Todd Pletcher (who already had Destin and Stradivari in the Belmont) to Steve Asmussen, the trainer of Creator.

The field was drawn on 8 June and the Preakness Stakes winner Exaggerator was installed as the 9/5 morning line favorite with thirteen entries.

== Race ==
The weather forecast predicted rain but it held off and the track was fast. As expected, Gettysburg went to the early lead, and set a moderate pace — slow compared to the fractions in shorter races, but relatively fast by the standards of the Belmont. Destin raced about a length behind Gettysburg for the first mile, then moved to the lead.

Photo finish at the Belmont Stakes

Meanwhile, Creator had broken slowly and spent the first half mile at the back of the pack. Jockey Irad Ortiz Jr. then moved the colt up to sixth place down the backstretch, continuing to save ground on the rail. As they entered the stretch, Creator was full of run but had nowhere to go, surrounded by other horses. Ortiz waited patiently until a hole opened, then burst through, rapidly closing on Destin to win by a nose. It was just the fourth photo finish in Belmont Stakes history.

Lani closed from last to third to round out an all-gray trifecta. The favorite, Exaggerator, had been closer to the front than was normal for him, and raced wide, struggling with jockey Kent Desormeaux to go faster. When Desormeaux finally asked for his run, Exaggerator had no response. Desormeaux said, "I nursed him to the quarter pole and set him down, put him down for a mad drive and said, 'Show me your stuff,' and there was nothing there." Exaggerator finished eleventh.

It was trainer Steve Asmussen's first Belmont Stakes win. "Obviously we're very proud of the horse. ... I really thought the horse tried to win late. He really laid out there, dug in, and I personally feel fortunate for his effort", said Asmussen.

"[Creator] was calm and I just waited for somewhere to go", said Oritz. "When he got clear, he started running. It's an amazing feeling." It was the first win in a Triple Crown race for the 23-year-old jockey.

== Chart ==
Finish	Post	Horse	Jockey	Trainer	Morning Line	Post time Odds	Winnings
1	13	Creator	Irad Ortiz Jr.	Steven Asmussen	10-1	16.4	$800,000
2	2	Destin	Javier Castellano	Todd Pletcher	6-1	8.4	$280,000
3	10	Lani	Yutaka Take	Mikio Matsunaga	20-1	12.2	$150,000
4	1	Governor Malibu	Joel Rosario	Christophe Clement	12-1	17.1	$100,000
5	5	Stradivari	John Velazquez	Todd Pletcher	5-1	6.6	$60,000
6	12	Brody's Cause	Luis Saez	Dale Romans	20-1	18.9	$45,000
7	3	Cherry Wine	Corey Lanerie	Dale Romans	8-1	10.3	$35,000
8	6	Gettysburg	Paco Lopez	Steven Asmussen	30-1	55.0	$30,000
9	4	Suddenbreakingnews	Mike E. Smith	Donnie Von Hemel	10-1	5.2	
10	9	Trojan Nation	Aaron Gryder	Patrick Gallagher	30-1	66.25	
11	11	Exaggerator	Kent Desormeaux	J. Keith Desormeaux	9-5	1.45	
12	7	Seeking the Soul	Florent Geroux	Dallas Stewart	30-1	55.0	
13	8	Forever d'Oro	José Ortiz	Dallas Stewart	30-1	65.0	

- Winning owner: WinStar Farm and Bobby Flay
- Breeder: Mt. Brilliant Broodmares
- Margins: nose, 1 1/4 lengths
- Time: 2:28.51
- Track: Fast
- Attendance: 60,114

== Payout ==
The 148th Belmont Payout Schedule

Program Number	Horse name	Win	Place	Show
13	Creator	$34.80	$14.60	$9.40
2	Destin	-	$9.40	$6.20
10	Lani	-	-	$6.60

- $2 Exacta (13 – 2 ) – $269.00
- $2 Trifecta (13 – 2 – 10) – $2,751.00
- $1 Superfecta (13 – 2 – 10 – 1) – $13,967.50

== See also ==
- 2016 Kentucky Derby
- 2016 Preakness Stakes
