= 2016 Preakness Stakes =

141st running of the Preakness Stakes

141st Preakness Stakes
- Preakness Stakes
- "The Middle Jewel of the Triple Crown" "The Run for the Black-Eyed Susans"
- Location: Pimlico Race Course; Baltimore, Maryland, U.S.
- Date: May 21, 2016
- Winning horse: Exaggerator
- Winning time: 1:58.31
- Final odds: 2.6-1
- Jockey: Kent Desormeaux
- Trainer: J. Keith Desormeaux
- Owner: Big Chief Racing LLC. et al
- Conditions: Sloppy (sealed)
- Surface: Dirt
- Attendance: ▲135,256 (record at the time)

The 2016 Preakness Stakes (in full, the Xpressbet.com Preakness Stakes, due to sponsorship) was the 141st running of the Preakness Stakes. The race was held on May 21, 2016, and was scheduled to be run at 6:45 pm Eastern Daylight Time (EDT) and was televised on NBC. Exaggerator won the race, while 2016 Kentucky Derby winner Nyquist finished third. The Maryland Jockey Club reported a track record total attendance of 135,256, the second highest attendance for American thoroughbred racing events in North America during 2016.

== Field ==
After the running of the Kentucky Derby connections of the winner Nyquist sent the horse to Pimlico on 9 May. Other runners from the Derby included second placed Exaggerator, who arrived at Pimlico on May 15, and 9th placed Lani. Of the other 17 Derby contenders, Gun Runner remained under consideration until Tuesday of Preakness week, then his trainer decided to rest him and train for races later in the summer instead. Derby contenders Brody's Cause and Suddenbreakingnews were set to skip the Preakness and point to the 2016 Belmont Stakes.

A total of eight new horses who did not contest the Derby were pointed at the Preakness. Awesome Speed, who won the Federico Tesio Stakes at Laurel Park, earned an automatic entry to the Preakness. Other new contenders included Cherry Wine and Laoban, both Derby also-eligibles who were not able to start in the Kentucky race. Of the horses who had not been on the Kentucky Derby trail, Stradivari, a lightly raced colt trained by Todd Pletcher, Collected, a Bob Baffert-trainee who won the Lexington Stakes, and Uncle Lino, a west coast horse who won the inaugural California Chrome Stakes drew press interest. Abiding Star was in question for a time, as he was stabled at Parx Racing, which was under a quarantine due to an outbreak of EHV-1 at that track. However, the quarantine was lifted on May 17, allowing him to ship to Pimlico and enter the race.

The draw for the race was held at 5:30 pm (EDT) on May 18 and Nyqist was installed as the 3-5 morning line favorite.

== Race ==
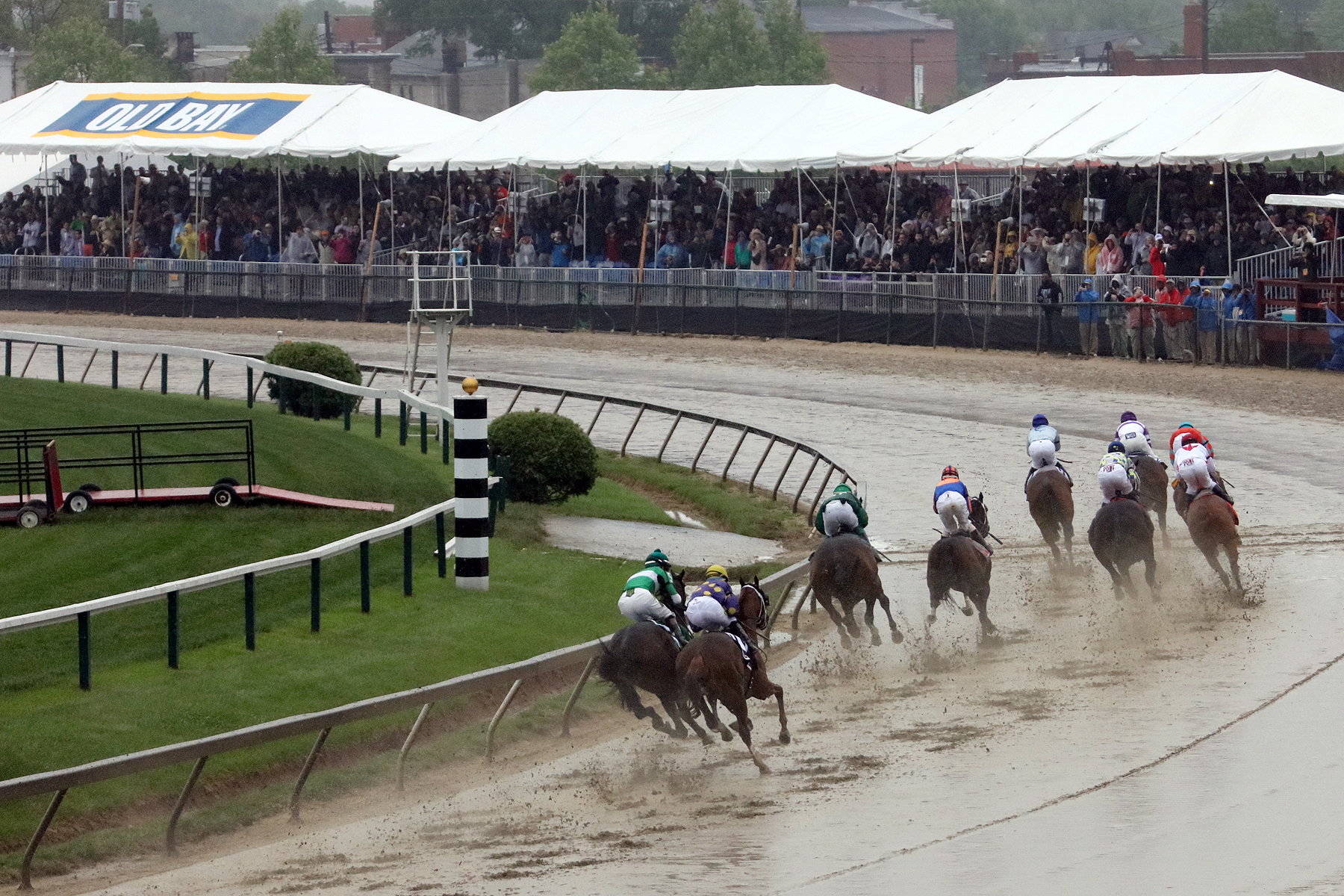
The sloppy but sealed track favored Exaggerator, who was well back in the field until the homestretch

On a rainy day, the race went off at 6:52 PM, EST. In spite of the weather, attendance was a record-breaking 135,256, beating the previous year's record of 131,680. The pari-mutuel take of $94,127,434 for the entire day's races also broke the previous record of $91,028,000 in 2005.

On a sloppy but sealed track, Nyquist fell prey to a blistering early pace set by Uncle Lino. He led briefly at the 1/2 mile pole, but by the stretch he faded, and Exaggerator won by 3 1/2 lengths. The second-place finisher, Cherry Wine, had hit his head on the starting gate and was second-to-last for much of the race but saved ground on the rail and rallied in the stretch to take second place over Nyquist by a nose, thus destroying any chance for the first back-to-back Triple Crown winners since 1977–78.

== Entries ==
Finish Position	Program Number	Horse name	Jockey	Trainer	Morning Line Odds	Post Time Odds	Stakes
1	5	Exaggerator	Kent Desormeaux	J. Keith Desormeaux	3-1	2.60	$900,000
2	1	Cherry Wine	Corey Lanerie	Dale Romans	20-1	17.30	$300,000
3	3	Nyquist	Mario Gutierrez	Doug O'Neill	3-5	0.70	$165,000
4	11	Stradivari	John Velazquez	Todd Pletcher	8-1	8.00	$90,000
5	6	Lani	Yutaka Take	Mikio Matsunaga	30-1	30.40	$45,000
6	8	Laoban	Florent Geroux	Eric Guillot	30-1	66.50	
7	2	Uncle Lino	Fernando Perez	Gary Sherlock	20-1	34.60	
8	10	Fellowship	Jose Lezcano	Mark E. Casse	30-1	58.10	
9	4	Awesome Speed	Jevian Toledo	Alan E. Goldberg	30-1	51.70	
10	7	Collected	Javier Castellano	Bob Baffert	10-1	14.0	
11	9	Abiding Star	J. D. Acosta	Ned Allard	30-1	40.40	

- Winning owner and breeder: Big Chief Racing, LLC, Head of Plains Partners LLC, Rocker O Ranch, LLC et al. Breeder: Joseph B. Murphy
- Final time: 1:58.31
- Margins: 3 1/2 lengths, nose.
- Track: Sloppy (sealed)
- ▲135,256 (record at the time)

== Payout ==
The 141st Preakness payout schedule

Pgm	Horse	Win	Place	Show
5	Exaggerator	$7.20	$3.20	$2.40
1	Cherry Wine	–	$9.80	$4.20
3	Nyquist	–	–	$2.20

- $2 Exacta (5-1) $88.40
- $2 Trifecta (5-1-3) $146.20
- $1 Superfecta (5-1-3-11) $317.00

== See also ==
- 2016 Kentucky Derby
- 2016 Belmont Stakes
