= Nysos =

American racehorse

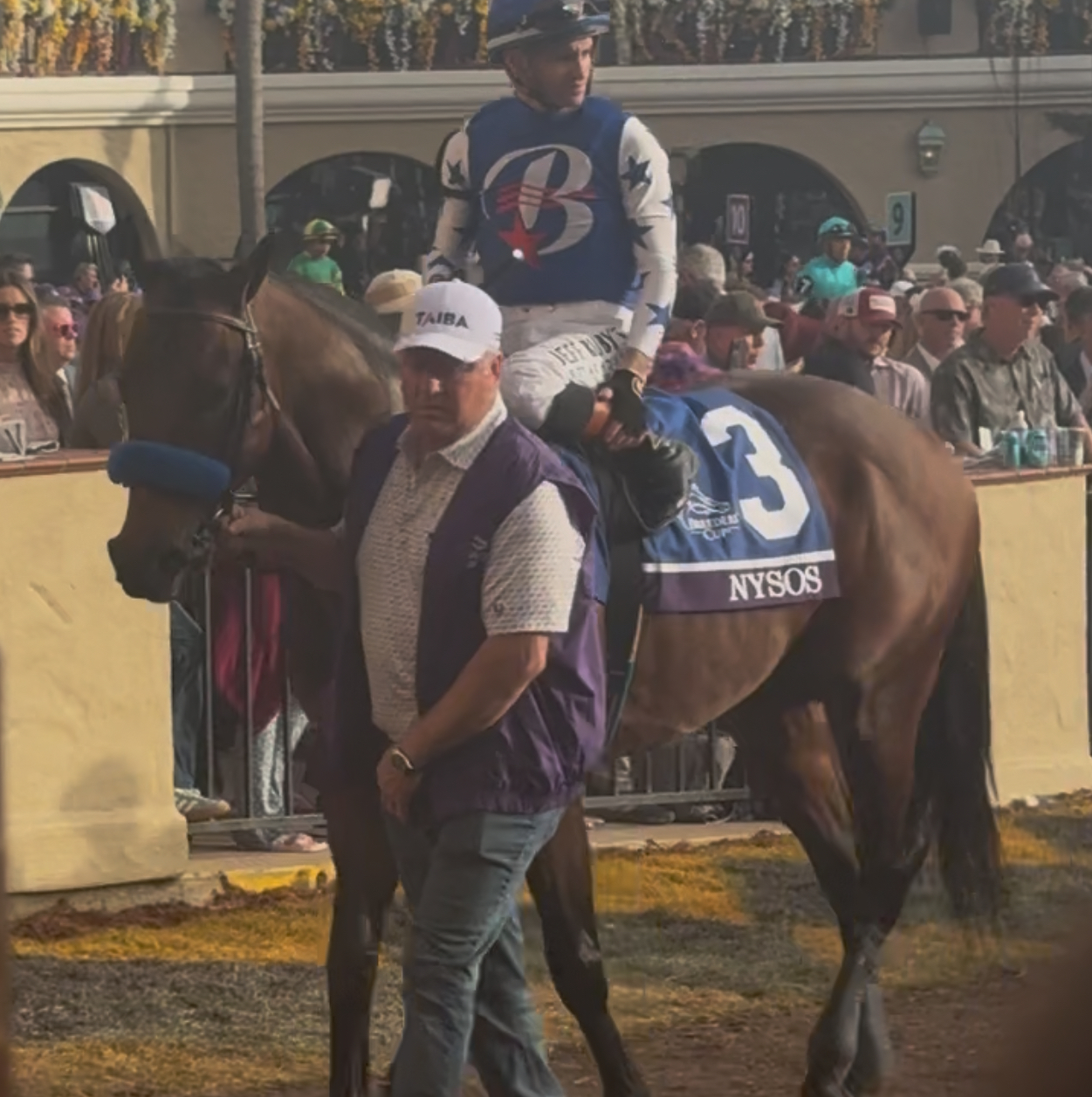
- Sire: Nyquist
- Grandsire: Uncle Mo
- Dam: Zetta Z
- Damsire: Bernardini
- Sex: Stallion
- Foaled: 8 May 2021
- Country: United States
- Colour: Bay
- Breeder: Susie Atkins
- Owner: 1. Baoma Corp (April 2023 – Nov. 2025); 2. Lessees added. Derrick Smith, Mrs. John Magnier & Michael Tabor (Nov. 2025)
- Trainer: Bob Baffert
- Record: 10: 8 - 2 - 0
- Earnings: US$5,288,500

Major wins
- Bob Hope Stakes (2023); Robert B. Lewis Stakes (2024); Triple Bend Stakes (2025); San Diego Handicap (2025); Laffit Pincay Jr. Stakes (2025); Metropolitan Handicap (2026); Breeders' Cup wins: Breeders' Cup Dirt Mile (2025)
- Last updated on June 7, 2026

Nysos (foaled 8 May 2021) is a retired multiple Grade winning American Thoroughbred racehorse and a current stud. As a four-year-old, won the Grade I Breeders' Cup Dirt Mile.

== Background ==
Nysos is a bay colt bred in Kentucky by Susie Atkins. His sire is Nyquist, winner of the 2016 Kentucky Derby and his dam is Zetta Z who was sired by Bernardini never started in an event. In 2024 Coolmore Stud bought Zetta Z for $2 million during the Fasig-Tipton Kentucky Winter Mixed Sale. Zetta Z's dam, Seresa's Spirit was also unraced. The third dam is Unbridled Elaine, who took the Pocahontas Stakes at two-year-old, and won the Grade 1 Breeders' Cup Distaff as a three-tear-old.

Nysos was named after a demigod In Greek mythology, who lived on Mount Nysa, identified as modern day Mount Kithairon.

Nysos went through the auction sales ring three times before starting for his current owners Charles and Susan Chu's Baoma Corporation. At the Keeneland Breeding Stock 2021 November Sale as a weanling Nysos was sold to Cypress Creek for $130,000. The following year at the Fasig-Tipton Kentucky Fall Yearling sale Nysos was sold for $150,000 to Best Of Luck Farm. He was then purchased as a two-year-old at the Ocala Breeders Sale for $550,000.

Nysos is trained by U.S. Racing Hall of Fame Bob Baffert.

In late 2025 after Nysos won the Grade 1 Breeders' Cup Dirt Mile, Coolmore Stud became registered lessee owners with Baoma.

== Statistics ==
Date	Distance	Race	Grade	Track	Odds	Field	Finish	Winning Time	Winning (Losing) Margin	Jockey	Ref
2023 – two-year-old season
Aug 17, 2023	6 furlongs	Maiden Special Weight		Santa Anita	6.40	10	1	1:08.97	10 1/2 lengths	Kyle Frey	
Nov 18, 2023	7 furlongs	Bob Hope Stakes	III	Del Mar	0.20*	4	1	1:21.71	8 3/4 lengths	Flavien Prat	
2024 – three-year-old season
Feb 2, 2024	1 mile	Robert B. Lewis Stakes	III	Santa Anita	0.10*	7	1	1:36.65	7 1/2 lengths	Flavien Prat	
2025 – four-year-old season
May 3, 2025	7 furlongs	Churchill Downs Stakes	I	Churchill Downs	6.54	11	2 (Note: Dead heat for second with Banishing)	1:22.64	(neck)	Flavien Prat	
May 31, 2025	7 furlongs	Triple Bend Stakes	III	Santa Anita	0.20*	4	1	1:21.28	5 1/2 lengths	Juan J. Hernandez	
Jul 26, 2025	1 mile	San Diego Handicap	II	Del Mar	0.10*	6	1	1:42.61	2 3/4 lengths	Flavien Prat	
Nov 1, 2025	1 mile	Breeders' Cup Dirt Mile	I	Del Mar	0.70*	8	1	1:34.71	head	Flavien Prat	
Dec 28, 2025	1 1/16 miles	Laffit Pincay Jr. Stakes	II	Santa Anita	0.20*	6	1	1:42.36	head	Flavien Prat	
2026 – five-year-old season
Feb 14, 2026	1800 m	Saudi Cup	I	King Abdulaziz	-- (Note: Nysos's final odds with British bookmakers were 9/2 since gambling is prohibited in the Kingdom of Saudi Arabia.)	14	2	1:51.21	(1 length)	Flavien Prat	
June 7, 2026	1 mile	Metropolitan Handicap	I	Saratoga	2.45*	7	1	1:34.85	4 lengths	Flavien Prat	

Notes:
An (*) asterisk after the odds means Nysos was the post-time favourite.

== Pedigree ==
Pedigree of Nysos, bay colt, 8 May 2021
Sire Nyquist (2013)	Uncle Mo (2008)	Indian Charlie (1995)	In Excess (IRE) (1987)
Sire Nyquist (2013)	Uncle Mo (2008)	Indian Charlie (1995)	Soviet Sojourn (1989)
Sire Nyquist (2013)	Uncle Mo (2008)	Playa Maya (2000)	Arch (1995)
Sire Nyquist (2013)	Uncle Mo (2008)	Playa Maya (2000)	Dixie Slippers (1995)
Sire Nyquist (2013)	Seeking Gabrielle (2007)	Forestry (1996)	Storm Cat (1983)
Sire Nyquist (2013)	Seeking Gabrielle (2007)	Forestry (1996)	Shared Interest (1988)
Sire Nyquist (2013)	Seeking Gabrielle (2007)	Seeking Regina (1992)	Seeking the Gold (1985)
Sire Nyquist (2013)	Seeking Gabrielle (2007)	Seeking Regina (1992)	Fulbright Scholar (1985)
Dam Zetta Z (2010)	Bernardini (2003)	A.P. Indy (1989)	Seattle Slew (1974)
Dam Zetta Z (2010)	Bernardini (2003)	A.P. Indy (1989)	Weekend Surprise (1980)
Dam Zetta Z (2010)	Bernardini (2003)	Cara Rafaela (1993)	Quiet American (1986)
Dam Zetta Z (2010)	Bernardini (2003)	Cara Rafaela (1993)	Oil Fable (1986)
Dam Zetta Z (2010)	Seresa's Spirit (2003)	Rahy (1985)	Blushing Groom (1974)
Dam Zetta Z (2010)	Seresa's Spirit (2003)	Rahy (1985)	Glorious Song (1976)
Dam Zetta Z (2010)	Seresa's Spirit (2003)	Unbridled Elaine (1998)	Unbridled's Song (1993)
Dam Zetta Z (2010)	Seresa's Spirit (2003)	Unbridled Elaine (1998)	Carols Folly (1987) (family 12-b)
