= Mohaymen =

American-bred Thoroughbred racehorse

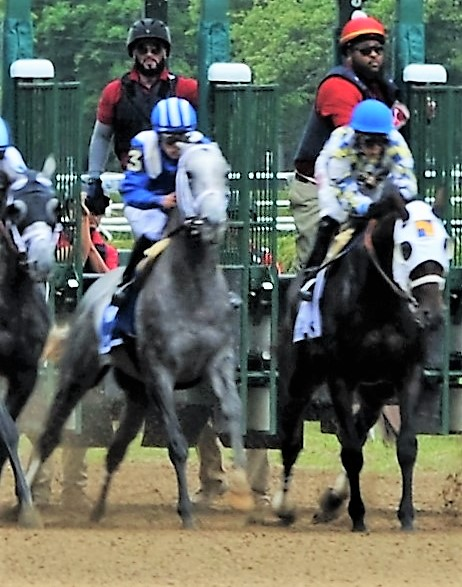
- Mohaymen (left) at the start of the Jim Dandy Stakes
- Sire: Tapit
- Grandsire: Pulpit
- Dam: Justwhistledixie
- Damsire: Dixie Union
- Sex: Colt
- Foaled: May 2, 2013
- Country: United States
- Colour: Gray
- Breeder: Clearsky Farms
- Owner: Shadwell Stable
- Trainer: Kiaran McLaughlin
- Record: 13: 5-0-0
- Earnings: $982,850

Major wins
- Nashua Stakes (2015); Remsen Stakes (2015); Holy Bull Stakes (2016); Fountain of Youth Stakes (2016)

Mohaymen (foaled May 2, 2013) is an American Thoroughbred racehorse. As a two-year-old in 2015 he was unbeaten in three races including the Nashua Stakes and the Remsen Stakes. In the following year he established himself as a leading contender for the Kentucky Derby with wins in the Holy Bull Stakes and the Fountain of Youth Stakes.

== Background ==
Mohaymen is a gray colt (officially "gray or roan"), bred in Kentucky by Clearsky Farms. He was sired by Tapit, who won the Wood Memorial Stakes and started second favorite for the 2004 Kentucky Derby. Tapit has become a successful breeding stallion with other progeny including Hansen, Untapable, Stardom Bound and Tonalist.

Mohaymen's dam Justwhistledixie was a successful racemare whose wins included the Davona Dale Stakes and the Bonnie Miss Stakes in 2009. Mohaymen was her third foal, the first being New Year's Day who won the Breeders' Cup Juvenile in 2013. Justwhistledixie was a descendant of the American broodmare Bold Irish who was the female line ancestor of numerous major winners including Ruffian, Pine Bluff and Fusaichi Pegasus.

In September 2014 the yearling was consigned to the Keeneland sales and was bought for $2.2 million by Hamdan Al Maktoum's Shadwell Estate Co. The colt was sent into training with Kiaran McLaughlin. Mohaymen (مهیمن) is an Arabic word meaning "dominant".

== Racing career ==
=== 2015: two-year-old season ===
Racing colors of Shadwell Stable

As a two-year-old Mohaymen was ridden in all of his races by jockey Junior Alvarado. He made his track debut in a maiden race over six furlongs at Belmont Park on September 19 and started 1.85/1 favorite against seven opponents. He led from the start and held off several challenges in the straight to win by half a length and a head from Seymourdini and King Kranz. The colt was then stepped up sharply in class for the Grade II Nashua Stakes over one mile at Aqueduct Racetrack on November 4. Starting the 11/10 favorite he moved up on the outside to dispute the lead on the final turn, gained the advantage early in the stretch and won by one and three quarter lengths from Flexibility despite drifting to the right in the closing stages. McLaughlin commented "We were a little worried about the kickback, how he would break, and the others that have had more racing experience than him. But he's a very talented horse and I'm glad he lived up to the betting public's odds". Alvarado reported that the colt had been uneasy in the starting gate but that when the race started "all I tried to do was not fall off".

On November 28 Mohaymen appeared again at Aqueduct and started favorite for the Grade II Remsen Stakes over nine furlongs. After tracking the leader Donegal Moon, he moved into contention on the final turn, took the lead a furlong out and won by one and a half lengths from Flexibility. After the race McLaughlin revealed that the horse had run on Lasix after bleeding in the Nashua Stakes. Alvarado commented "He got outrun the first part and I didn't want to rush him too much; he can get a little tough... I just tried to find my way and every time I pushed the button, he's there for me. He makes my job a lot easier".

In the Experimental Free Handicap (a ranking of the best American two-year-olds), published at the end of January, Mohaymen was assigned 119 pounds, seven pounds behind the top-rated Nyquist.

=== 2016: three-year-old season ===
In the early part of 2016, Mohaymen was sent to race in Florida and was based at the Palm Meadows Training Center in Boynton Beach. On his first appearance of the year the colt contested the Grade II Holy Bull Stakes over eight and a half furlongs at Gulfstream Park on January 30 and started the odds-on favorite against five opponents headed by the Champagne Stakes winner Greenpointcrusader. After tracking the leaders in the early stages he went to the front approaching the turn and drew away to win by three and a half lengths from Greenpointcrusader. Alvarado said "Mentally, he's so mature. He does whatever I want... I could have gone around (again) easily with him. I still had plenty of horse. You can feel the acceleration".

On February 27, over the same course and distance, Mohaymen started 2/5 favorite for the Fountain of Youth Stakes in which his five opponents included the Swale Stakes winner Awesome Banner and the previously unbeaten Zulu. He raced just behind the leaders before taking moving up to challenge Zulu approaching the final turn. He took the lead in the stretch and won by two and a quarter lengths from Zulu with Fellowship four lengths back in third place. After the race McLaughlin indicated that the colt would run next in the Florida Derby even though it might entail a clash with Nyquist. He commented "He's always been a real gentleman, does everything right, and sometimes by Tapit, they don't do that. So we're lucky we've had quite a few good ones by Tapit, but this is a special one". In the highly anticipated matchup, Nyquist won the Florida Derby by 3 1/4 lengths, defeating rival Mohaymen, who "did not fire" and finished fourth.

On May 7 Mohaymen started fourth favorite in a twenty-runner field for the 2016 Kentucky Derby. After racing in mid-division he was switched to the outside and made steady progress in the straight to finish fourth behind Nyquist, Exaggerator and Gun Runner.

Monhaymen was given some time off then returned to racing on July 30 in the Jim Dandy Stakes, where he finished fourth after stumbling at the break.

== Pedigree ==
Pedigree of Mohaymen, gray colt, 2013
| Sire Tapit (USA) 2001 | Pulpit (USA); 1994 | A.P. Indy | Seattle Slew |
| Sire Tapit (USA) 2001 | Pulpit (USA); 1994 | A.P. Indy | Weekend Surprise |
| Sire Tapit (USA) 2001 | Pulpit (USA); 1994 | Preach | Mr. Prospector |
| Sire Tapit (USA) 2001 | Pulpit (USA); 1994 | Preach | Narrate |
| Sire Tapit (USA) 2001 | Tap Your Heels (USA); 1996 | Unbridled | Fappiano |
| Sire Tapit (USA) 2001 | Tap Your Heels (USA); 1996 | Unbridled | Gana Facil |
| Sire Tapit (USA) 2001 | Tap Your Heels (USA); 1996 | Ruby Slippers | Nijinsky |
| Sire Tapit (USA) 2001 | Tap Your Heels (USA); 1996 | Ruby Slippers | Moon Glitter |
| Dam Justwhistledixie (USA) 2006 | Dixie Union (USA); 1997 | Dixieland Band | Northern Dancer |
| Dam Justwhistledixie (USA) 2006 | Dixie Union (USA); 1997 | Dixieland Band | Mississippi Mud |
| Dam Justwhistledixie (USA) 2006 | Dixie Union (USA); 1997 | She's Tops | Capote |
| Dam Justwhistledixie (USA) 2006 | Dixie Union (USA); 1997 | She's Tops | She's A Talent |
| Dam Justwhistledixie (USA) 2006 | General Jeanne (USA); 1999 | Honour and Glory | Relaunch |
| Dam Justwhistledixie (USA) 2006 | General Jeanne (USA); 1999 | Honour and Glory | Fair to All |
| Dam Justwhistledixie (USA) 2006 | General Jeanne (USA); 1999 | Ahpo Hel | Mr Leader |
| Dam Justwhistledixie (USA) 2006 | General Jeanne (USA); 1999 | Ahpo Hel | Tiy (Family: 8-c) |
