= J. Keith Desormeaux =

Horse trainer

Personal information
- Born: c. 1967 (age 58–59) Maurice, Louisiana, United States
- Occupation: Horse trainer

Horse racing career
- Sport: Horse racing
- Career wins: 815 (ongoing) as of October 1, 2024

Major racing wins
- Delta Princess Stakes (2006); Risen Star Stakes (2013); Delta Jackpot Stakes (2015); Goldikova Stakes (2015); Jim Dandy Stakes (2015); Landaluce Stakes (2015); Saratoga Special Stakes (2015); San Juan Capistrano Stakes (2015); American Oaks (2016); Haskell Invitational Stakes (2016); Santa Anita Derby (2016); Providencia Stakes (2016); Speakeasy Stakes (2017); Lexington Stakes (2018); Southwest Stakes (2018); Sweet Life Stakes (2019) American Classics wins: Preakness Stakes (2016) Breeders' Cup wins: Breeders' Cup Juvenile (2014)

Significant horses
- Exaggerator, Swipe, Texas Red, I've Struck a Nerve

J. Keith Desormeaux (born c. 1967) is a horse trainer in American Thoroughbred horse racing. He is the brother of jockey Kent Desormeaux and trainer of 2016 Preakness Stakes winner Exaggerator.

Desormeaux was born in Maurice, Louisiana, part of Louisiana's Cajun region. His brother, Horse Racing Hall of Fame jockey Kent Desormeaux Keith was named John Keith in honor of one of his mother's siblings. Harris Desormeaux owned Acadiana Downs, a "bush track". As children Keith and Kent showed ponies in 4-H competition, played basketball, and the brothers attempted their first collaboration at a race at Acadiana Downs when Keith was 18 and Kent 15, but did not win.

Keith Desormeaux originally wanted to become a veterinarian, but instead completed a degree in animal science at Louisiana Tech University after he decided to become a horse trainer. He began his training career in the 1980s in Maryland, first working with other trainers such as Charlie Hadry, and then opening his own training stable in 1991, though he had raced horses under his own name as early as 1988. He originally came to Maryland on his summer break from college, exercising racehorses. Kent had been very successful in Maryland and encouraged Keith to come there to work. Keith Desormeaux later moved to Texas and trained at Lone Star Park until 1997, when he moved to California.

Desormeaux struggled throughout his career to team up with owners able to purchase the highest-quality horses. His break came when he met Matt Bryan, an oilman who owned Big Chief Racing Stables. Desormeaux finally came to national attention in 2013 in winning the Risen Star Stakes with Bryan's horse I've Struck a Nerve, a 135–1 longshot, the biggest upset in the history of the race. Desormeaux stated at the time, "I can sit here and tell you I'm a good trainer, but I can't make a slow horse fast. When you've got a little bit of money behind the horse power you can see what happens." It was his first graded stakes win. On August 21, 2014, Dexormeaux passed the 500 win mark. And that same year teamed up with brother Kent to win the Breeders' Cup Juvenile with Texas Red. Comparing the work of his jockey brother Kent to his own work as a horse trainer, Desormeaux said, "His job is over and done in two minutes. Mine takes two years."

In 2015, Desormeaux began sending out horses who challenged Nyquist, the 2015 American Champion Two-Year-Old Male Horse. In the 2015 Breeders' Cup Juvenile, he sent out two horses, Swipe and Exaggerator, who finished second and fourth to Nyquist. In 2016, Exaggerator won the Santa Anita Derby and had also challenged Nyquist again two more times, including in the 2016 Kentucky Derby, where he finished second, each time closing his rival by an ever-narrower margin until finally defeating Nyquist at the 2016 Preakness Stakes.

Desormeaux has a son. Since 2010, his significant other has been Julie Clark, who worked with polo ponies for 20 years before becoming a racehorse trainer. She both manages Desormeaux's horses when they are away from their home base and assists with his overall training operation.
