= Creator (horse) =

American-bred Thoroughbred racehorse

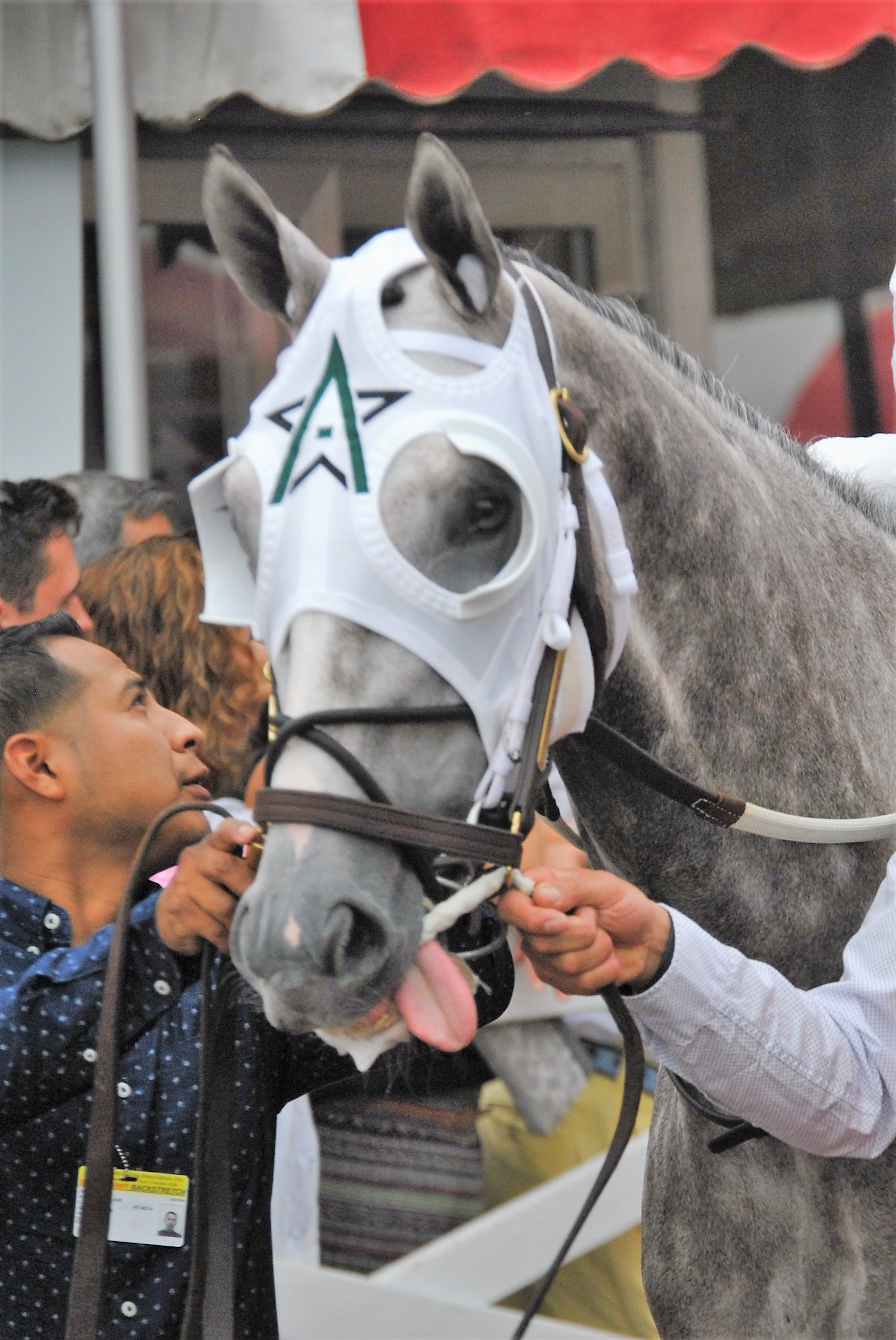
- Creator at Saratoga in 2016
- Sire: Tapit
- Grandsire: Pulpit
- Dam: Morena (PER)
- Damsire: Privately Held
- Sex: Stallion
- Foaled: March 30, 2013
- Country: United States
- Colour: Gray
- Breeder: Mt.Brilliant Broodmares
- Owner: WinStar Farm and Bobby Flay
- Trainer: Steven M. Asmussen
- Record: 12: 3-4-1
- Earnings: $1,610,320

Major wins
- Arkansas Derby (2016); Triple Crown Race wins: Belmont Stakes (2016)
- Last updated on August 28, 2016

Creator (foaled March 30, 2013, in Kentucky) is a retired American Thoroughbred racehorse, best known as the winner of the 2016 Belmont Stakes and Arkansas Derby.

== Background ==
Creator is a dapple gray colt, a color he inherited from leading sire Tapit, whose other offspring include the 2014 Belmont Stakes winner Tonalist and 2015 Belmont Stakes runner-up Frosted. His dam, Morena, was a champion filly in Peru at both age 2 and 3 before being sent to the United States, where she finished third in the Personal Ensign Stakes.

Creator was bred by Mt. Brilliant Broodmares and sold at the Keeneland September Sale for $440,000 to WinStar Farm. His consignor, Michael Hernon, said later, "He was a correct, good mover, with a touch of class, and he seemed real genuine. He had size and scope and was well made. He was our number one choice, and it is very gratifying to see he is a grade I winner and a horse who is coming into his own of late."

Creator was trained by Steve Asmussen, whose numerous stakes winners included champion filly Untapable, also by Tapit. It was the first time WinStar had sent a horse to Asmussen. WinStar's CEO Elliot Walden explained, "[Creator]'s been a very high-strung horse in the beginning. I liked what Steve had done with some of the Tapits he's had in the past, so that's why we sent Creator to him. ... I love his style."

Just before the Belmont Stakes, celebrity chef Bobby Flay purchased a minority interest in the colt.

Creator is a closer who likes to sit back and make a strong late move.

== Racing career ==
In 2015 at the age of two, Creator ran four times, finishing second three times and fifth once. His first race on September 19 was typical: the chart says that he was outrun for the first half mile, went wide around the turn and closed fast, finishing second to Samicean (GER).

In 2016, now age three, he started out on the same foot, finishing second in a maiden special weight race at the Fair Grounds. He then shipped to Oaklawn Park and, on February 27, finally broke his maiden. Although he again raced wide, this time he was "full of run" to win by over seven lengths.

He was next entered on March 19 in the Rebel Stakes, also at Oaklawn Park, a qualifying race on the Road to the Kentucky Derby. The chart for the race shows that he broke last, raced 4-wide into the far turn, and closed powerfully to finish third. Most eyes though were on the Bob Baffert-trained winner, Cupid.

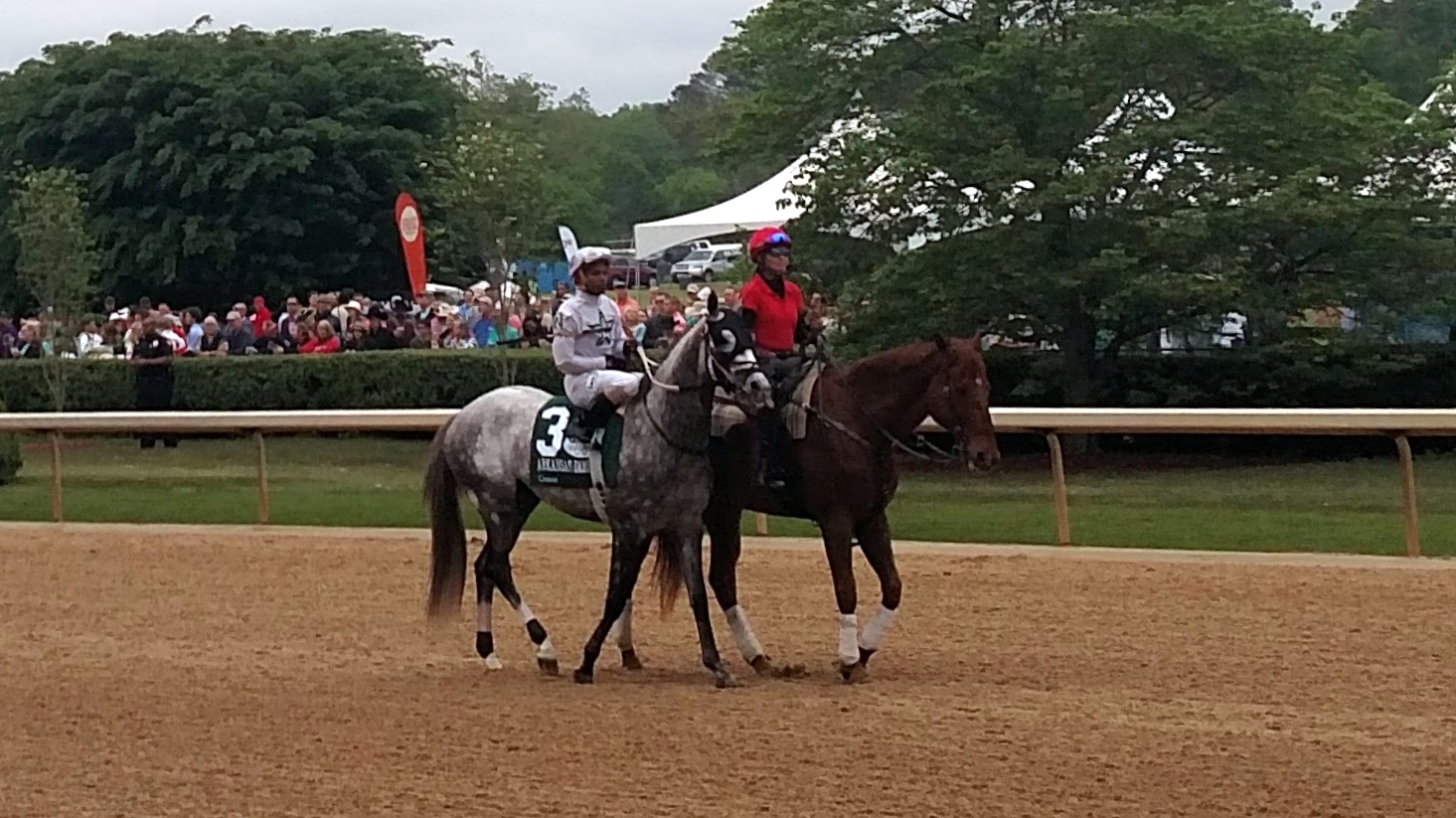
Creator in the post parade before the 2016 Arkansas Derby

On April 16, he entered the last major Kentucky Derby prep, the Arkansas Derby, at odds of 11–1. He again faced Cupid plus ten other colts, all of whom he trailed coming out of the gate. At one point, he was over 15 lengths behind Cupid on the lead. But Cupid eventually tired just as Creator hit his best stride. His jockey, Ricardo Santana, took him through traffic and though the colt was lightly bumped, Creator powered clear and drew off to win by 1 1/4 lengths. Santana explained, "(Trainer) Steve [Asmussen] told me to be patient, be patient, because you're going to have a lot of horse. It worked out — worked out really good. I hope I have the same trip in the Kentucky Derby."

Instead, Creator would have the worst race of his career. On May 7, he was sent off at odds of 16–1 in the 2016 Kentucky Derby. He broke slowly and settled near the rail at the back of the pack with a few other horses who shared his running style. He started his run on the far turn and angled to the outside but was bumped heavily at the head of the stretch. Losing his momentum, Creator could not make up enough ground and finished thirteenth.

Asmussen gave the colt a few days off and skipped the Preakness Stakes. For the 2016 Belmont Stakes on June 11, he engaged Irad Ortiz, Jr, one of the leading jockeys on the New York circuit. After racing at the back of the field around the first turn, Ortiz moved the colt up to sixth place down the backstretch, continuing to save ground on the rail. As they entered the stretch, Creator was full of run but had nowhere to go, surrounded by other horses. Ortiz waited patiently until a hole opened, then burst through, rapidly closing on the leader, Destin, to win by a nose. "I thought Irad gave him a perfect trip," Asmussen said. "I thought he saved yards and won by inches. He made the difference."

Creator came out of the race well and was turned out at WinStar Farms for some "mental freshening." He returned to racing in the Jim Dandy Stakes on July 30, finishing sixth. In the Travers Stakes on a fast track at Saratoga on 27 August Creator finished seventh of the thirteen runners behind Arrogate.

== Stud career ==
Creator retired in October 2016. He was sold to the Japan Bloodhorse Breeders’ Association (JBBA) and stood at the Shizunai Stallion Station in Hokkaido, Japan starting with the 2017 breeding season. In December 2024 it was announced by the JBBA that Creator was sold to stand at stud in Saudi Arabia. He had produced 77 winners out of 119 starters at the time of his departure from Japan, with total purse earnings of nearly US$6 million.

== Pedigree ==
Pedigree of Creator (USA), gray colt, 2013
Sire Tapit (USA) 2001	Pulpit; 1994	A.P. Indy	Seattle Slew
Sire Tapit (USA) 2001	Pulpit; 1994	A.P. Indy	Weekend Surprise
Sire Tapit (USA) 2001	Pulpit; 1994	Preach	Mr. Prospector
Sire Tapit (USA) 2001	Pulpit; 1994	Preach	Narrate
Sire Tapit (USA) 2001	Tap Your Heels; 1996	Unbridled	Fappiano
Sire Tapit (USA) 2001	Tap Your Heels; 1996	Unbridled	Gana Facil
Sire Tapit (USA) 2001	Tap Your Heels; 1996	Ruby Slippers	Nijinsky (CAN)
Sire Tapit (USA) 2001	Tap Your Heels; 1996	Ruby Slippers	Moon Glitter
Dam Morena (PER) 2004	Privately Held; 1994	Private Account	Damascus
Dam Morena (PER) 2004	Privately Held; 1994	Private Account	Numbered Account
Dam Morena (PER) 2004	Privately Held; 1994	Advance	Northfields
Dam Morena (PER) 2004	Privately Held; 1994	Advance	Minnie Hauk
Dam Morena (PER) 2004	Charytin (PER); 1991	Summing	Verbatim
Dam Morena (PER) 2004	Charytin (PER); 1991	Summing	Sumatra
Dam Morena (PER) 2004	Charytin (PER); 1991	Crownit (FR)	King of Macedon (IRE)
Dam Morena (PER) 2004	Charytin (PER); 1991	Crownit (FR)	Queen's Up (Family: 2-o)

Creator is inbred 4 × 5 to Mr. Prospector, meaning Mr. Prospector appears once in the fifth generation of Creator's pedigree and once in the fourth generation. Creator is also inbred 5 × 5 to Northern Dancer.
