= Exaggerator =

American-bred Thoroughbred racehorse

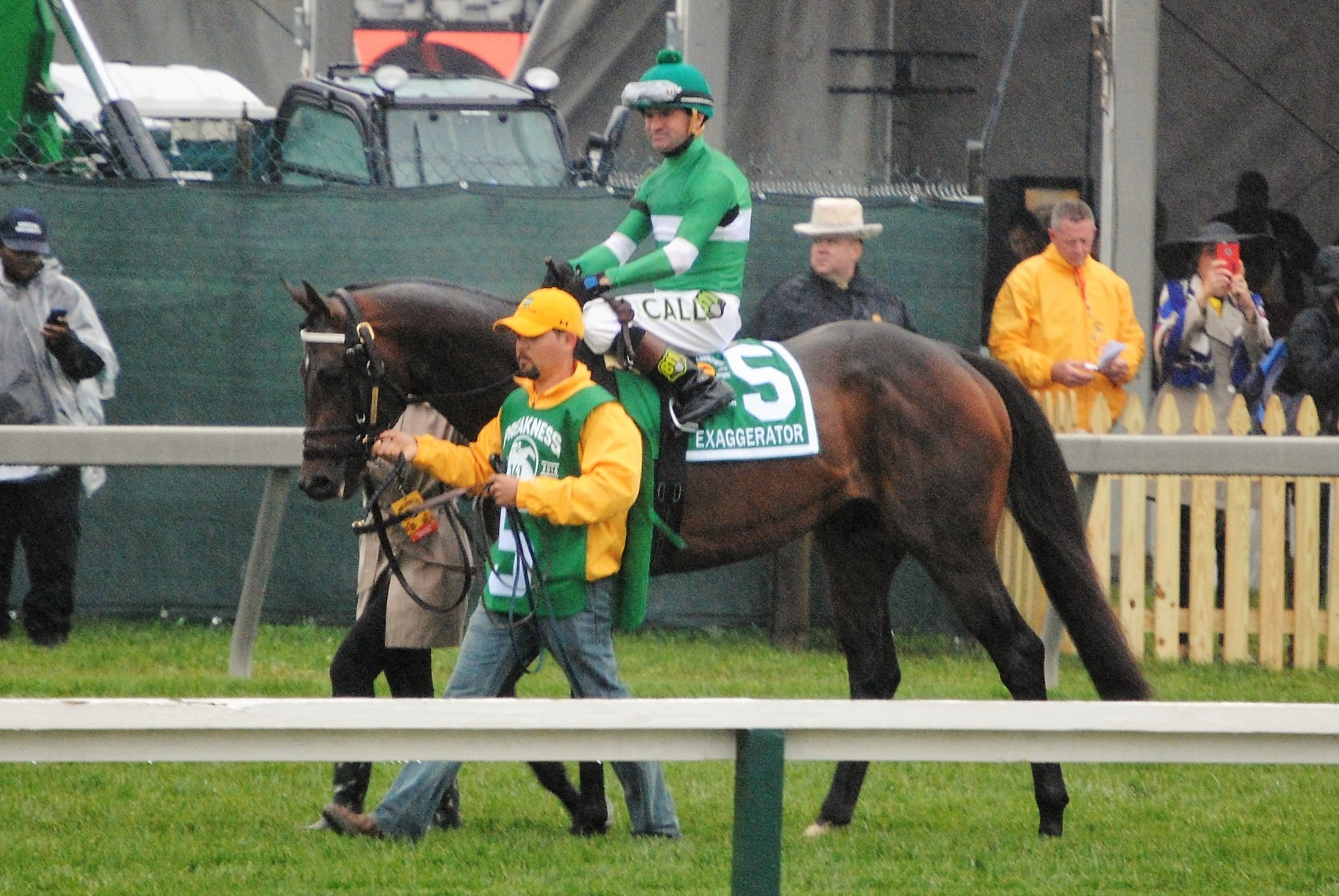
- Exaggerator prior to the Preakness
- Sire: Curlin
- Grandsire: Smart Strike
- Dam: Dawn Raid
- Damsire: Vindication
- Sex: Stallion
- Foaled: February 5, 2013
- Country: United States
- Colour: Dark bay or Brown
- Breeder: Joseph B Murphy
- Owner: Big Chief Racing LLC et al
- Trainer: J. Keith Desormeaux
- Record: 15: 6-3-1
- Earnings: $3,571,120

Major wins
- Saratoga Special Stakes (2015); Delta Jackpot Stakes (2015); Santa Anita Derby (2016); Haskell Invitational (2016) Triple Crown race wins Preakness Stakes (2016)

Exaggerator (foaled February 5, 2013) is a retired American Thoroughbred racehorse, winner of the 2016 Preakness Stakes. Racing as a two-year-old in 2015, he won three of his six starts including the Saratoga Special Stakes and the Delta Jackpot Stakes as well as finishing second in the Breeders' Futurity and fourth in the Breeders' Cup Juvenile. The following spring, he finished second in the San Vicente Stakes and third in the San Felipe Stakes before establishing himself as a contender for the 2016 Kentucky Derby with a six length win in the Santa Anita Derby. After finishing second to Nyquist in the Derby, he turned the tables to win the 2016 Preakness Stakes. He ran poorly in the 2016 Belmont Stakes but defeated Nyquist again in the Haskell Invitational. Tactically, Exaggerator was a "closer" – one who prefers to come from behind in his races.

== Background ==
Exaggerator is a dark bay or brown colt with a small white star and a white sock on his right hind leg. Bred in Kentucky by Joseph B Murphy, he is from the fourth crop of foals sired by the 2007 Preakness Stakes and Breeders' Cup Classic winner Curlin, whose other offspring have included Palace Malice and Keen Ice. Exaggerator's dam Dawn Raid showed some good form as a two-year-old in 2007, winning two races and finishing third in the Fanfreluche Stakes. She was a great-granddaughter of Bon Debarras, whose other descendants have included the Queen's Plate winner Niigon.

Exaggerator was foaled at Stoneleigh Farm, where his nickname was "Buster." At Stoneleigh, he was well-liked by the staff, reputed to be a well-mannered colt in training, but playful in the pasture, where he would throw a horse toy "Jolly Ball" over the fence at passers-by, hoping they would throw it back in a game of fetch. The yearling colt was consigned to the Keeneland sale in September 2014 as Hip 1473 and bought for $110,000 by Big Chief Racing.

After the 2015 Breeders' Cup, the owner of Big Chief Racing, Matt Bryan, brought additional partners into ownership of the horse. A 20 percent share is held by Sol Kumin under the business name Head of Plains Partners. Kumin is also noted as the owner of the mare Lady Eli. Another significant share in the partnership is held by Rocker O Ranch, owned by Ronny Ortowski.

Prior to the Kentucky Derby, WinStar Farm announced that it had acquired the breeding rights to Exaggerator.

During his racing career Exaggerator was trained by J. Keith Desormeaux. His regular jockey was his trainer's younger brother, Kent Desormeaux.

== Racing career ==
=== 2015: two-year-old career ===
Exaggerator began his racing career by finishing fifth behind Nyquist in a five-furlong maiden race at Santa Anita Park on June 5. On July 26 at Del Mar Racetrack Exaggerator started favorite for a maiden over six furlongs and recorded his first success, coming from well off the pace to take the lead in the final stride and win by a nose from Miner's Light. The colt was then stepped up in class for the Grade II Saratoga Special Stakes over 6 1/2 furlongs at Saratoga Race Course. Racing for the first time outside California his final preparation for the race was handled by Desormeaux's assistant Julie Clark and he was ridden by Junior Alvarado. He raced at the rear of the six-runner field before producing a sustained run along the rail to take the lead inside the final furlong and won by three-quarters of a length from the favored Saratoga Mischief. After the race Clark commented that Exaggerator "showed some real class for a baby".

On October 3 Exaggerator started favorite for the Grade I Breeders' Futurity over 8 1/2 furlongs at Keeneland. After tracking the leaders he took the lead in the stretch but was overtaken in closing stages and finished second, beaten a length by Brody's Cause. Four weeks later, over the same course and distance, Exaggerator was one of fourteen colts to contest the Breeders' Cup Juvenile. After tracking the leaders he stayed on in the stretch without ever looking likely to win and finished fourth behind Nyquist, Swipe and Brody's Cause, beaten three lengths by the winner. On his final appearance of the season, Exaggerator started favorite for the Delta Downs Jackpot Stakes run on November 21 on a muddy track at Delta Downs in Louisiana. The best fancied of his rivals was Sunny Ridge, who had finished runner-up in the Champagne Stakes. Exaggerator took the lead after a quarter mile and fought off a sustained challenge from Sunny Ridge to win by a neck. Commenting on the colt as a potential Kentucky Derby contender Keith Desormeaux said "He's bred for it. He has the precociousness and the athleticism for it."

=== 2016: three-year-old career ===
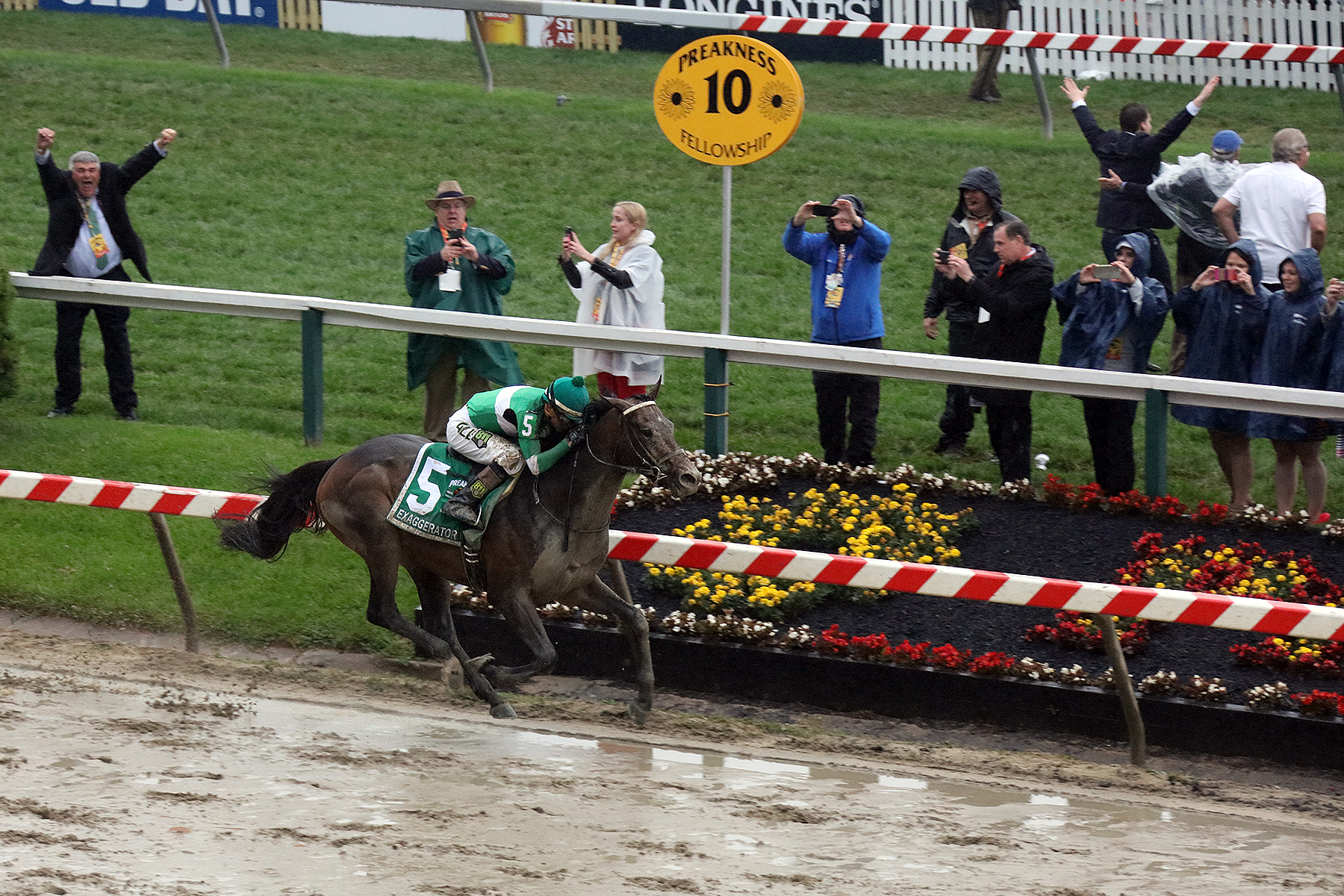
Exaggerator winning the Preakness

Exaggerator began his second season in the Grade II San Vicente Stakes at Santa Anita on February 15. He came from off the pace and finished strongly but was beaten 1 1/2 lengths into second place by Nyquist. Up to this point the colt tended to run as a "stalker", staying close to the pace. After the San Vicente, Desormeax changed tactics and began training him to colt fall back and come from behind, making him a "closer".

In the San Felipe Stakes on March 12 Exaggerator started second favorite behind Mor Spirit, a Bob Baffert-trained colt who had won the Los Alamitos Futurity and the Robert B. Lewis Stakes on his last two starts. He challenged for the lead on the final turn but finished third behind the wire-to-wire winner Danzing Candy with Mor Spirit taking second. Exaggerator faced Danzing Candy and Mor Spirit again in the Grade I Santa Anita Derby on April 9 and started third choice in the betting at odds of 3.4/1. Racing on a sloppy track, Exaggerator trailed the field in the early stages as Danzing Candy set the pace but began to make rapid progress half a mile from the finish. He drew alongside the leaders on the final turn and quickly went clear of the field to win by six and a quarter lengths from Mor Spirit with Uncle Lino taking third ahead of the tiring Danzing Candy. Kent Desormeaux commented "He was the fourth horse that I rode in the mud today and the others felt like they had ice skates on: Exaggerator felt like he had track shoes on. He really liked the going and I think that was part of his incredible effort today. He enjoyed the mud".

On May 7 Exaggerator started second favorite in a twenty-runner field for the 2016 Kentucky Derby. Racing on a fast surface he was towards the rear of the field until he began to overtake horses in the last half mile. He made a strong challenge in the straight but was unable to overhaul the favored Nyquist and finished second, beaten one and a quarter lengths. On May 21 Exaggerator started second favorite behind Nyquist for the Preakness Stakes at Pimlico Race Course, with the lightly raced Stradivari the best-fancied of the other nine runners. On a rainy day, and a sloppy but sealed track, Kent Desormeaux restrained the colt well behind the very fast pace set by Nyquist and Uncle Lino. Exaggerator began to make progress on the inside approaching the final turn before being switched to the outer to make his challenge in the straight. He overtook Nyquist approaching the final furlong and drew away in the closing stages to win by 3 1/2 lengths. The outsider Cherry Wine, who had hit his head on the starting gate and was second-to-last for much of the race finished strongly to deprive Nyquist of second by a nose. After the race the winning jockey commented "I had a dream trip today. I was on the fence and they all stayed wide. With these turns you want to paint the fence. We did, they didn't... knowledge is power". Explaining the colt's light training regimen since the Derby, Keith Desormeaux said: "My philosophy was to take it as easy as possible because you're not going to gain any fitness in those two weeks. I did what I could to get him happy and fresh and strong".

After an 11th-place finish in the G1 Belmont Stakes on June 11 Exaggerator returned to the races in the G1 Haskell Invitational at Monmouth Park on July 31. Over a sloppy track, Exaggerator bested American Freedom to win the race in a final time of 1:48:70. "It was a reminder of the Preakness. … I just tried to bide my time", Desormeaux said after trailing by 8 1/2 lengths at the half-mile pole. "He really exploded at the quarter pole … rode right off my fingertips. Exceptional race horse." In the Travers Stakes on a fast track at Saratoga on 27 August Exaggerator started favorite but was never in contention and finished eleventh of the thirteen runners behind Arrogate.

== Retirement ==
On October 10, 2016, it was announced that Exaggerator had been retired from racing. Starting in 2017, he stands as a breeding stallion at WinStar Farm in Kentucky. His first foals will be of racing age in 2020.

== Pedigree ==
Pedigree of Exaggerator (USA), bay or brown colt, 2013
Sire Curlin (USA) 2004	Smart Strike (CAN); 1992	Mr. Prospector	Raise a Native
Sire Curlin (USA) 2004	Smart Strike (CAN); 1992	Mr. Prospector	Gold Digger
Sire Curlin (USA) 2004	Smart Strike (CAN); 1992	Classy 'n Smart	Smarten
Sire Curlin (USA) 2004	Smart Strike (CAN); 1992	Classy 'n Smart	No Class
Sire Curlin (USA) 2004	Sheriff's Deputy (USA); 1994	Deputy Minister	Vice Regent
Sire Curlin (USA) 2004	Sheriff's Deputy (USA); 1994	Deputy Minister	Mint Copy
Sire Curlin (USA) 2004	Sheriff's Deputy (USA); 1994	Barbarika	Bates Motel
Sire Curlin (USA) 2004	Sheriff's Deputy (USA); 1994	Barbarika	War Exchange
Dam Dawn Raid (CAN) 2005	Vindication (USA); 2000	Seattle Slew	Bold Reasoning
Dam Dawn Raid (CAN) 2005	Vindication (USA); 2000	Seattle Slew	My Charmer
Dam Dawn Raid (CAN) 2005	Vindication (USA); 2000	Strawberry Reason	Strawberry Road
Dam Dawn Raid (CAN) 2005	Vindication (USA); 2000	Strawberry Reason	Pretty Reason
Dam Dawn Raid (CAN) 2005	Embur Sunshine (CAN); 1993	Bold Ruckus	Boldnesian
Dam Dawn Raid (CAN) 2005	Embur Sunshine (CAN); 1993	Bold Ruckus	Raise A Ruckus
Dam Dawn Raid (CAN) 2005	Embur Sunshine (CAN); 1993	Vevila	The Minstrel
Dam Dawn Raid (CAN) 2005	Embur Sunshine (CAN); 1993	Vevila	Bon Debarras (Family: 3-g)
