= Brody's Cause =

American-bred Thoroughbred racehorse

- Sire: Giant's Causeway
- Grandsire: Storm Cat
- Dam: Sweet Breanna
- Damsire: Sahm
- Sex: Colt
- Foaled: March 17, 2013
- Country: United States
- Colour: Bay
- Breeder: William Arvin Jr., Gabriel Duignan & Petaluma Bloodstock
- Owner: Albaugh Family Stable
- Trainer: Dale Romans
- Record: 7: 3-0-1
- Earnings: $1,123,138

Major wins
- Breeders' Futurity Stakes (2015); Blue Grass Stakes (2016)

Brody's Cause (foaled March 17, 2013) is an American Thoroughbred racehorse. He has won Grade I races at two and three years of age and was regarded as a contender for the 2016 Kentucky Derby. After finishing unplaced on his debut he won a maiden race and then took the Grade I Breeders' Futurity Stakes before finishing third in the Breeders' Cup Juvenile. In 2016 he ran poorly in the Tampa Bay Derby before taking the Blue Grass Stakes.

== Background ==
Brody's Cause is a bay horse with a white blaze and three white socks bred in Kentucky by William Arvin Jr., Gabriel Duignan & Petaluma Bloodstock. He was sired by Giant's Causeway, who was the European Horse of the Year in 2000 and later won three sires' championships in North America. His other good winners have included Shamardal, Footstepsinthesand, Ghanaati, Take Charge Brandi and Rite of Passage. Brody's Cause's dam Sweet Breanna showed good racing form in her native Canada, winning three times and being placed in the La Lorgnette Stakes and the Woodbine Oaks. She was a female-line descendant of Secretariat's grand-dam Imperatrice.

In September 2014 the yearling was consigned to the Keeneland sale and was bought for $350,000 by Dennis and Susan Albaugh's Albaugh Family Stable. The colt was sent into training with Dale Romans.

== Racing career ==
=== 2015: two-year-old career ===
Brody's Cause began his racing career in a one-mile maiden race at Ellis Park Race Course on August 1 when he was well supported in the betting but finished eighth of the ten runners behind One Legend. On September 11 the colt started favorite for another maiden over the same distance at Churchill Downs. Ridden by Emmanuel Esuivel he started steadily before making his challenge on the wide outside entering the straight. He took the lead in the last hundred yards and won by one and a quarter lengths from Conquest. Three weeks after his win at Churchill Downs, Brody's Cause was stepped up sharply in class for the Grade I Breeders' Futurity at Keeneland, a race which saw Corey Lanerie take over as his jockey. Saratoga Special Stakes winner Exaggerator started favorite with Brody's Cause being made the 11.8/1 sixth-choice in an eleven-runner field. Racing on a muddy track, Brody's Cause was restrained by Lanerie in the early stages before making progress on the outside in the stretch. He overhauled Exaggerator in the final strides and won by a length. Lanerie commented "I think the sky is the limit for him. Just the way he does things, he does it so easy", while Romans described the winner as "just a damn good horse".

On his final appearance as a two-year-old Brody's Cause started second favorite for the Breeders' Cup Juvenile at Keeneland on October 31. After racing towards the rear of the fourteen runner field before making steady progress in the straight to finish third behind Nyquist and Swipe.

=== 2016: three-year-old career ===
On March 12, 2016, Brody's Cause began his second season in the Tampa Bay Derby a Grade II trial race for the Kentucky Derby run over 8 1/2 furlongs at Tampa Bay Downs. He was made the 2.3/1 favorite but after being bumped at the start he finished seventh of the nine runners behind the Todd Pletcher-trained Destin. Luis Saez took over from Lanerie when Brody's Cause returned to Grade I class for the Blue Grass Stakes at Keeneland on April 9. He started the 4.2/1 second favorite behind the Fountain of Youth Stakes runner-up Zulu, with the best of the other twelve runners appearing to be the Chad Brown-trained My Man Sam and the Romans stable's other runner Cherry Wine. Brody's Cause was held up as usual as the outsider Laoban set the early pace, before making strong progress on the outside approaching the final turn. He maintained his run into the stretch, took the lead a furlong out and won by 1 3/4 lengths from My Man Sam, with Cherry Wine a head away in third. After the race Romans described the winner as "a prototype Derby horse".

On May 7 Brody's Cause was one of twenty colts to contest the 2016 Kentucky Derby. Although he had been regarded as a leading contender in the build-up to the race his odds drifted badly on the day and he started a 24.9/1 outsider. He raced wide for most of the way and made some progress in the closing stages but never looked likely to challenge the leaders and finished seventh behind Nyquist.

== Stud career ==
Brody's Cause entered stud in 2017 at Spendthrift Farm.

=== Notable progeny ===
c = colt, f = filly, g = gelding

Foaled	Name	Sex	Major Wins
2018	Kalypso	f	La Brea Stakes

== Pedigree ==
Pedigree of Brody's Cause (USA), bay colt, 2013
Sire Giant's Causeway (USA) 1997	Storm Cat (USA); 1983	Storm Bird	Northern Dancer
Sire Giant's Causeway (USA) 1997	Storm Cat (USA); 1983	Storm Bird	South Ocean
Sire Giant's Causeway (USA) 1997	Storm Cat (USA); 1983	Terlingua	Secretariat
Sire Giant's Causeway (USA) 1997	Storm Cat (USA); 1983	Terlingua	Crimson Saint
Sire Giant's Causeway (USA) 1997	Mariah's Storm (USA); 1991	Rahy	Blushing Groom
Sire Giant's Causeway (USA) 1997	Mariah's Storm (USA); 1991	Rahy	Glorious Song
Sire Giant's Causeway (USA) 1997	Mariah's Storm (USA); 1991	Immense	Roberto
Sire Giant's Causeway (USA) 1997	Mariah's Storm (USA); 1991	Immense	Imsodear
Dam Sweet Breanna (CAN) 2003	Sahm (USA); 1994	Mr. Prospector	Raise a Native
Dam Sweet Breanna (CAN) 2003	Sahm (USA); 1994	Mr. Prospector	Gold Digger
Dam Sweet Breanna (CAN) 2003	Sahm (USA); 1994	Salsabil	Sadler's Wells
Dam Sweet Breanna (CAN) 2003	Sahm (USA); 1994	Salsabil	Flame of Tara
Dam Sweet Breanna (CAN) 2003	Sweet Roberta (USA); 1987	Roberto	Hail To Reason
Dam Sweet Breanna (CAN) 2003	Sweet Roberta (USA); 1987	Roberto	Bramalea
Dam Sweet Breanna (CAN) 2003	Sweet Roberta (USA); 1987	Candy Bowl	Majestic Light
Dam Sweet Breanna (CAN) 2003	Sweet Roberta (USA); 1987	Candy Bowl	Quick Cure (Family: 2-s)

- Brody's Cause is inbred 3x4 to Roberto, meaning that the stallion appears in both the third and fourth generations of his pedigree.
