= 2016 Kentucky Derby =

Horse race

142nd Kentucky Derby
- Kentucky Derby
- Official logo for the 2016 Kentucky Derby
- Location: Churchill Downs; Louisville, Kentucky, U.S.
- Date: May 7, 2016
- Winning horse: Nyquist
- Winning time: 2:01.31
- Jockey: Mario Gutierrez
- Trainer: Doug O'Neill
- Owner: J. Paul Reddam
- Conditions: Fast
- Surface: Dirt
- Attendance: 167,227

The 2016 Kentucky Derby was the 142nd running of the Kentucky Derby. The race was run at 6:51 pm Eastern Daylight Time (EDT) on May 7, 2016, at Churchill Downs. The race was broadcast in the United States on the NBC television network. The second-largest attendance of 167,227 was on hand for the event.

== Qualification ==
The Kentucky Derby is a race for 3-year-old Thoroughbred horses. The 2016 field was determined by the Road to the Kentucky Derby points system that was first introduced in 2013.

== Field ==
The Post Position Draw of the entries for the Kentucky Derby was held Wednesday, May 4, 2016, at the Churchill Downs Racetrack clubhouse. After the draw was made, the undefeated Nyquist was installed as the 3–1 morning line favorite. In spite of having been undefeated in his seven previous races and having already defeated several of the other entries, including second-favorite Exaggerator, Nyquist was viewed as vulnerable, in part because of the statistical improbability of the race favorite winning for four years in a row. Pundits also noted the unusual number of gray horses in the field, four in total and three of them sons of Tapit, a gray stallion who is ranked as the leading sire in America.

== Race description ==
Nyquist in the starting gate.

At the start, Danzing Candy quickly took the lead and held onto it for seven furlongs (4,600 ft; 1,400 m) until fading. The favorite, Nyquist, broke well and stayed close to the leaders, no farther back than third throughout the race. At the top of the stretch, Gun Runner, who had been running second or third throughout, briefly took the lead but was quickly surpassed by Nyquist. Exaggerator, who had started well back in 15th place, closed fast at the end. Nyquist held him off to win the race by 1 1/4 lengths. Nyquist was the eighth undefeated winner in Kentucky Derby history, the first since Big Brown in 2008. The last horse to have been undefeated in seven races prior to winning the Derby was Majestic Prince in 1969.

=== Results ===
Finish	Post	Horse	Jockey	Trainer	Morning Line Odds	Final Odds	Margin (lengths)	Winnings	Points
1	13	Nyquist	Mario Gutierrez	Doug O'Neill	3–1	2.30	1 1/4	$1,631,600	130
2	11	Exaggerator	Kent Desormeaux	J. Keith Desormeaux	8–1	5.10	1 1/4	$400,000	126
3	5	Gun Runner	Florent Geroux	Steven Asmussen	10–1	10.30	4 1/2	$200,000	151
4	14	Mohaymen	Junior Alvarado	Kiaran McLaughlin	10–1	11.80	4 1/2	$100,000	80
5	2	Suddenbreakingnews	Luis Quinonez	Donnie K. Von Hemel	20–1	24.60	4 3/4	$60,000	50
6	9	Destin	Javier Castellano	Todd Pletcher	15–1	18.0	7		51
7	19	Brody's Cause	Luis Saez	Dale Romans	12–1	24.90	9 1/2		114
8	4	Mo Tom	Corey Lanerie	Tom Amoss	20–1	25.70	10 1/4		32
9	8	Lani	Yutaka Take	Mikio Matsunaga	30–1	29.30	10 3/4		100
10	17	Mor Spirit	Gary Stevens	Bob Baffert	12–1	12.8	14 1/2		84
11	6	My Man Sam	Irad Ortiz Jr.	Chad C. Brown	20–1	19.50	14 1/2		40
12	12	Tom's Ready	Brian Hernandez Jr.	Dallas Stewart	30–1	49.10	17		44
13	3	Creator	Ricardo Santana Jr.	Steven Asmussen	10–1	16.40	18 1/4		110
14	15	Outwork	John Velazquez	Todd Pletcher	15–1	26.50	18 1/2		120
15	20	Danzing Candy	Mike E. Smith	Clifford Sise Jr.	15–1	25.70	20		60
16	1	Trojan Nation	Aaron Gryder	Patrick Gallagher	50–1	42.10	26 3/4		40
17	7	Oscar Nominated	Julien Leparoux	Michael Maker	50–1	42.30	32 1/2		50
18	18	Majesto	Emisael Jaramillo	Gustavo Delgado	30–1	56.60	36 3/4		40
19	10	Whitmore	Victor Espinoza	Ron Moquett	20–1	30.30	37 1/4		44
DNF	16	Shagaf	Joel Rosario	Chad C. Brown	20–1	56.0			50
	also eligible	~~Laoban~~	~~Cornelio Velásquez~~	~~Eric Guillot~~	SCR				32
	also eligible	~~Cherry Wine~~	~~Robby Albarado~~	~~Dale Romans~~	SCR				25

- Track – Fast

Times: 1/4 mile – 0:22.58; 1/2 mile – 0:45.72; 3/4 mile – 1:10.40; mile – 1:36.51; final – 2:01.31.
Splits for each quarter-mile: (:22.58) (:23.14) (:24.68) (:25.21) (:25.70)

Source: Equibase chart

== Payout ==
The Kentucky Derby Payout Schedule

Program Number	Horse Name	Win	Place	Show
13	Nyquist	$6.60	$4.80	$3.60
11	Exaggerator	–	$5.40	$4.20
5	Gun Runner	–	–	$6.00

- $2 Exacta: (13–11) $30.80
- $1 Trifecta: (13–11–5) $86.70
- $1 Superfecta: (13–11–5–14) $542.10
- $1 Super Hi 5 (Pentafecta): (13–11–5–14–2) $5,794.50

== Subsequent Grade I wins ==
Although Nyquist never won another race, several other horses from the Derby went on to win at the Grade I level:

- Exaggerator – Preakness Stakes, Haskell Invitational
- Gun Runner – Clark Handicap, 2017 Stephen Foster Handicap, Whitney Stakes, Woodward Stakes, Breeders' Cup Classic, 2018 Pegasus World Cup
- Mor Spirit – 2017 Metropolitan Handicap
- Creator – Belmont Stakes
- Whitmore – 2018 Forego Stakes, 2020 Breeders' Cup Sprint
