= Nyquist (horse) =

American-bred Thoroughbred racehorse

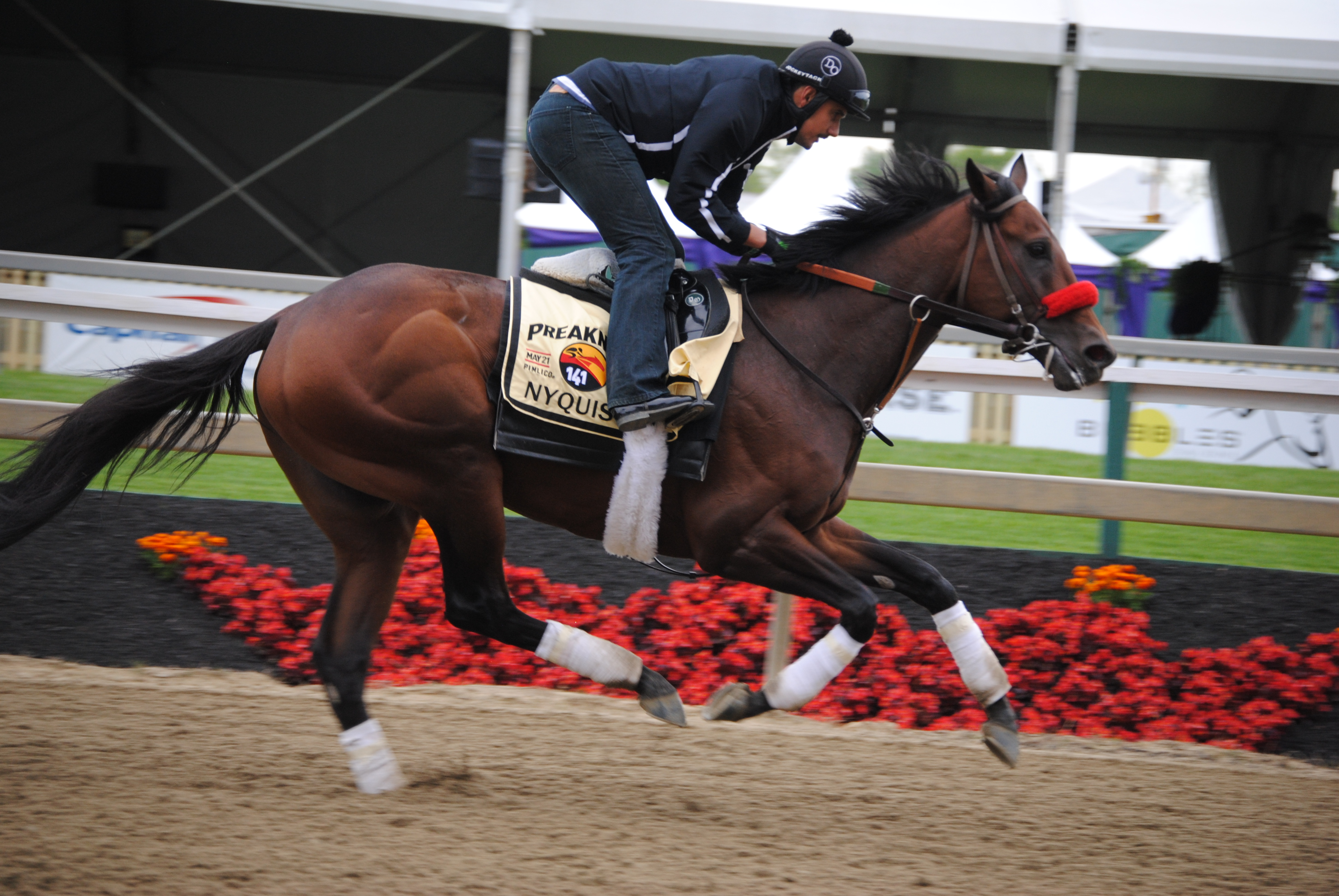
- Nyquist in a workout prior to the 2016 Preakness
- Breed: Thoroughbred
- Sire: Uncle Mo
- Grandsire: Indian Charlie
- Dam: Seeking Gabrielle
- Damsire: Forestry
- Sex: Stallion
- Foaled: March 10, 2013 (age 13)
- Country: United States
- Color: Bay
- Breeder: Summerhill Farm
- Owner: J. Paul Reddam, Reddam Racing
- Trainer: Doug O'Neill
- Record: 11: 8–0–1
- Earnings: US $5,189,200

Major wins
- Best Pal Stakes (2015); Del Mar Futurity (2015); FrontRunner Stakes (2015); Breeders' Cup Juvenile (2015); San Vicente Stakes (2016); Florida Derby (2016); Triple Crown Race wins: Kentucky Derby (2016)

Awards
- American Champion Two-Year-Old Male Horse (2015)

Nyquist (foaled March 10, 2013) is a champion American Thoroughbred racehorse who won the 2016 Kentucky Derby and 2015 Breeders' Cup Juvenile, only the second horse to complete the Juvenile-Derby double. He became the eighth undefeated winner of the Kentucky Derby, and the first since Big Brown in 2008. He received the 2015 Eclipse Award for Champion Two-Year-Old. He is the second Kentucky Derby winner after Morvich to win the race while undefeated after winning Champion Two Year Old the year before, and then never winning again.

== Background ==
Nyquist is a bay colt with no discernible white markings. He is owned and trained by the same team who won the 2012 Kentucky Derby with I'll Have Another, J. Paul Reddam and Doug O'Neill. As Reddam is a fan of ice hockey, he named the colt after Gustav Nyquist, who at the time played for the Detroit Red Wings. On the morning of the Kentucky Derby, the NHL brought the Stanley Cup to Churchill Downs, where Nyquist (the horse) posed with it.

Nyquist was bred in Kentucky by Summerhill Farm, which purchased his dam, Seeking Gabrielle, in 2011 for $45,000. In 2012, Seeking Gabrielle was bred to Uncle Mo, then a first-year sire standing for $35,000. Seeking Gabrielle was offered for sale at the 2012 Keeneland Sales with Nyquist in utero, but failed to meet her reserve. Nyquist was foaled on March 10, 2013, at Coolmore's Ashford Stud in Versailles, Kentucky. His breeder, Tim Hyde Jr, summarized his prime attributes: "Really good walker, really good attitude. He has a lot of presence."

Nyquist went through the sales ring three times, first as a weanling at Keeneland November, selling for $180,000. Next he sold as a yearling at the Keeneland September auction for $230,000. At two, he sold at the Fasig-Tipton March sale for $400,000 to Dennis O'Neill on behalf of his brother, trainer Doug O'Neill. Days after he won the Breeders' Cup Juvenile, Darley America purchased his breeding rights.

== Racing career ==
=== 2015: Two-Year-Old Season ===
Nyquist, ridden by Mario Gutierrez, began his racing career on June 15, 2015, in a five-furlong maiden special weight at Santa Anita Park. He went straight to the lead, was passed in the stretch by Annie's Candy, but fought back and won by a head. He next ran on August 8 in the grade II Best Pal Stakes at Del Mar. He went off as the even money favorite in a field of six. He stalked just off the pace, then swung wide on the turn to take the lead. He drew away to win by 5 1/2 lengths, with Swipe in second and Annie's Candy a half-length back in third. After the race, trainer Doug O'Neil said, "If he stays injury free, he's got the mind of a champ."

Nyquist's third start was on September 7 in the grade I Del Mar Futurity at seven furlongs. He was the odds-on favorite at 1–2 in a field of six that included old foes Annie's Candy and Swipe. He tracked in third behind Annie's Candy, who set a quick pace of 44.54 seconds for the first half mile. As they headed into the stretch, Nyquist moved past Annie's Candy and though "geared down" in the stretch won by 3 3/4 lengths over Swipe.

Next was the grade I FrontRunner Stakes on September 26 at Santa Anita. At 1 1/16 mile, this was Nyquist's first race around two turns. He faced eight rivals and was made the 1–2 favorite. Nyquist fought for the early lead and entered the first turn three wide. Gutierrez then settled him just off the pace through a moderate half mile in 47.01 seconds. Nyquist went to the lead at the top of the stretch and then held off a stretch drive by Swipe to win. There was a stewards' inquiry regarding possible interference down the stretch, but the results stood. The margin of victory was only three-quarters of a length, which, combined with a relatively slow time, led to questions about his stamina.

Nyquist then was flown to Lexington, Kentucky, for the Breeders' Cup Juvenile on October 31. In a field of 14, he went off as third favorite at 4.70–1. Nyquist was bumped hard at the start and was forced to race from behind. He was four wide around the first turn and backstretch, then swung six wide in the final turn. He went to the lead at the top of the stretch and held off the rapidly closing Swipe by half a length, with Brody's Cause and Exaggerator just back in a blanket finish.

At the Eclipse Awards for 2015, Nyquist was named American Champion Two-Year-Old Male Horse, taking 255 of the 261 votes.

=== 2016: Three-Year-Old Season ===
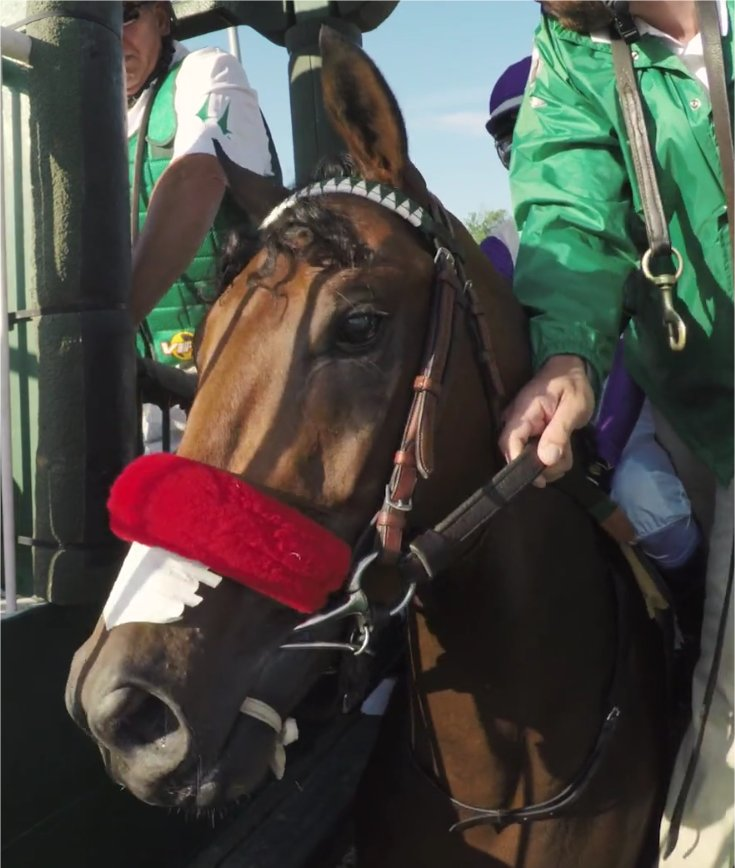
Nyquist in the starting gate at the Kentucky Derby

Nyquist began his three-year-old season on February 15 in the San Vicente Stakes at seven furlongs. Because of the shorter distance, the San Vincente is not part of the official Road to the Kentucky Derby, so is no longer commonly entered by Derby contenders. However, using a sprint to begin Nyquist's preparation was a throwback to the training methods of decades past. Going off as 2–5 favorite, Nyquist dueled for the lead with Sheikh of Sheikhs in a fast opening half mile of 44.49, then pulled away coming around the far turn. Exaggerator challenged him down the stretch, at one point closing to within half a length, before Nyquist again pulled away, eventually winning by 1 1/2 lengths. The winning time of 1:20.71 was the third fastest in the history of the race. Keith Desormeaux, trainer of Exaggerator, said, "Anybody not a believer in Nyquist now—that was an awesome race. To set those kinds of fractions and still finish in close to track record time for a 3-year-old in February? Wow. Hat's off to Nyquist."

A Fasig-Tipton $1,000,000 bonus was available if he won the Florida Derby, as he went through the Fasig-Tipton ring at two. For that reason, rather than running in the Santa Anita Derby on his home track to earn Kentucky Derby points, the colt ran in the Florida Derby at Gulfstream Park. Nyquist challenged previously undefeated Mohaymen. For his first race at 1 1/8 miles, Nyquist went off as the 6–5 second choice in a field of 10. He went straight to the lead and set moderate opening fractions, racing wide a track rated as good. Mohaymen challenged on the far turn but was carried even wider to get around Nyquist. Nyquist drew away, winning by 3 1/4 lengths. Majesto closed on the rail for second, while Mohaymen dropped back to fourth.

==== Triple Crown series ====
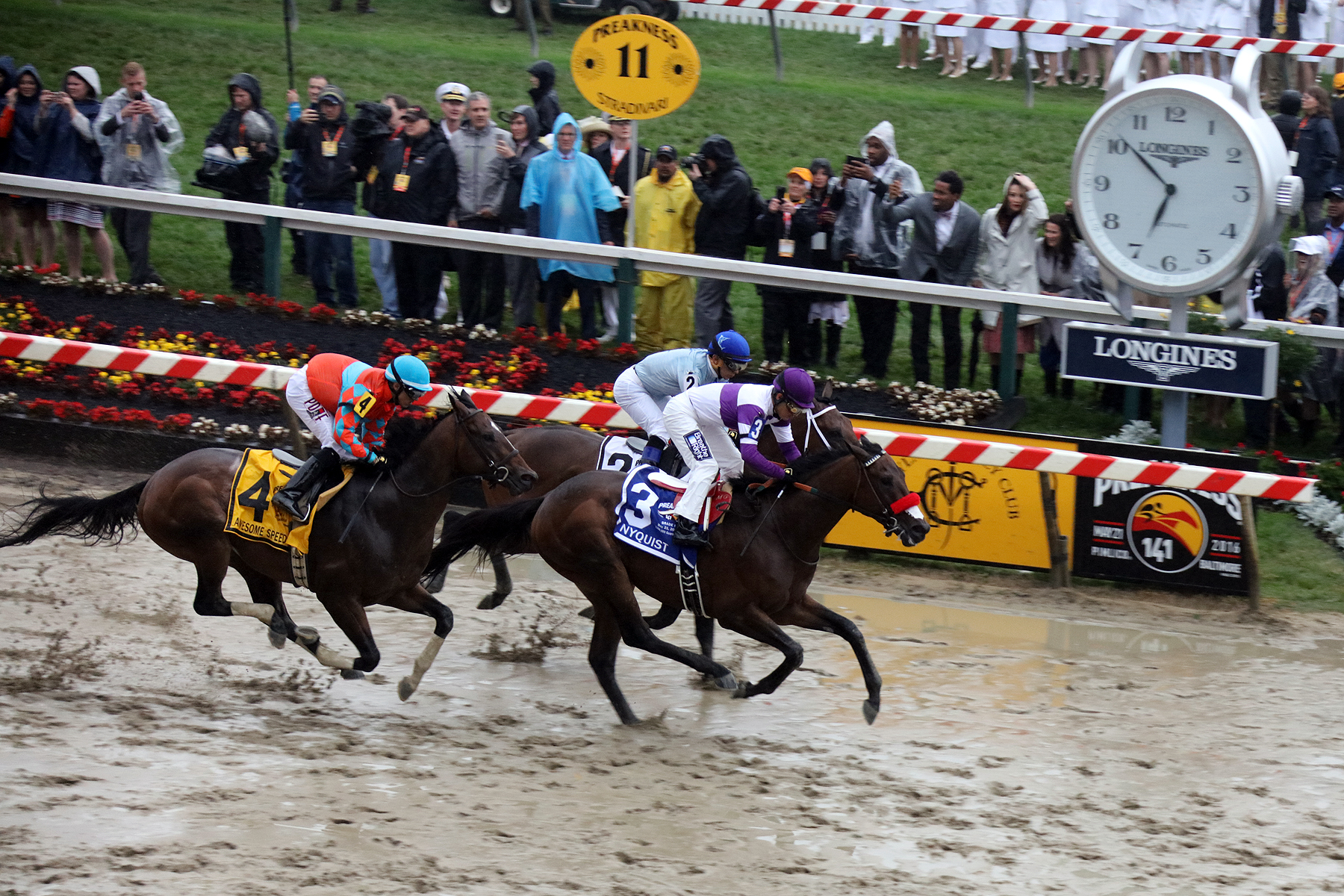
Nyquist led early on in the Preakness before finishing third

For the Kentucky Derby on May 7, Nyquist drew post position 13 in a full field of 20. Going off as the 2–1 favorite, Nyquist broke well and sprinted to the lead to establish position close to the rail. Gutierrez then eased back on the colt while Danzing Candy rushed up on the outside to set a very fast pace. Gun Runner tracked in third and then moved to the lead when Danzing Candy started to tire around the far turn. Nyquist responded and drew away from the field at the head of the stretch, then withstood a sustained drive by Exaggerator to win by 1 1/4 lengths. Gun Runner finished third with Mohaymen in fourth.

At the 2016 Preakness Stakes, on a wet track, Nyquist became the victim of a blistering early pace and came in third behind winner Exaggerator and second-place finisher Cherry Wine. Nyquist developed a fever the day after the Preakness and Doug O'Neill decided to postpone shipping Nyquist to Belmont Park. Nyquist was withdrawn from the Belmont Stakes on May 24 after developing a high leucocyte count.

==== Later Three-Year-Old Season ====
After being scratched from the Belmont, Nyquist remained at Pimlico to receive treatment, and his connections hoped at the time to start in the Travers Stakes in August.

He next ran the Haskell Invitational at Monmouth Park which ended up being exactly like the Preakness for him. Got in a speed duel on a sloppy track, stuck on the rail and Exaggerator took off to win. He took yet another rest and ran in the Pennsylvania Derby. Finally on a fast track for the first time since May, everyone thought this would be his race to win but he faded to sixth.

The plan from there was to run in the Breeders' Cup Classic, but the Thursday before after sluggish workout it was found Nyquist had puffy ankles and was withdrawn from the race. Shortly thereafter, he was retired to stand at Darley's Jonabell Stud in Lexington, Kentucky despite his owners having purchased a spot in the Pegasus World Cup.

== Stud career ==
Nyquist was advertised to stand his first year at stud in 2017 for a fee of $40,000. On December 22, 2016, Nyquist underwent surgery at Hagyard Equine Medical Institute in Lexington for colic. He recovered well.

Nyquist at Darley's Jonabell Farm

=== Notable progeny ===
c = colt, f = filly, g = gelding

Foaled	Name	Sex	Major Wins
2018	Vequist	f	Spinaway Stakes, Breeders' Cup Juvenile Fillies
2018	Gretzky The Great	c	Summer Stakes
2019	Slow Down Andy	c	Awesome Again Stakes
2020	Randomize	f	Alabama Stakes, Ogden Phipps Stakes
2020	Johannes	c	Shoemaker Mile Stakes
2021	Cavalieri	f	Beholder Mile Stakes
2021	Nysos	c	Breeders' Cup Dirt Mile, Metropolitan Handicap
2021	Knightsbridge	c	Pacific Classic
2022	Immersive	f	Spinaway Stakes, Alcibiades Stakes, Breeders' Cup Juvenile Fillies
2022	Tenma	f	Del Mar Debutante Stakes
2022	Velocity	f	Del Mar Oaks
2023	Argos	c	Summer Stakes
2024	Emphatic	f	Alcibiades Stakes, Breeders' Cup Juvenile Fillies

== Race Record ==
Date	Track	Race	Grade	Distance	Finish	Time
6/5/2015	Santa Anita Park	Maiden	Maiden	5 furlongs	1	0:56.43
8/8/2015	Del Mar racetrack	Best Pal Stakes	II	6 1/2 furlongs	1	1:16.84
9/7/2015	Del Mar racetrack	Del Mar Futurity	I	7 furlongs	1	1:23.28
9/26/2015	Santa Anita Park	FrontRunner Stakes	I	1 1/16 miles	1	1:44.89
10/31/2015	Keeneland	Breeders' Cup Juvenile	I	1 1/16 miles	1	1:43.79
2/15/2016	Santa Anita Park	San Vicente Stakes	II	7 furlongs	1	1:20.71
4/2/2016	Gulfstream Park	Florida Derby	I	1 1/8 miles	1	1:49.11
5/7/2016	Churchill Downs	Kentucky Derby	I	1 1/4 miles	1	2:01.31
5/21/2016	Pimlico Race Course	Preakness Stakes	I	1 3/16 miles	3	1:58.31
7/31/2016	Monmouth Park	Haskell Invitational	I	1 1/8 miles	4	1:48.30
9/24/2016	Parx Racing	Pennsylvania Derby	II	1 1/8 miles	6	1:50.20

== Pedigree ==
Nyquist is from the first crop of Uncle Mo, and is the first foal out of Seeking Gabrielle. Helped by Nyquist's earnings, Uncle Mo led the 2015 freshman sire list in America, setting an earnings record. Uncle Mo also sired several other stakes winners in the first crop, two of which joined Nyquist in the field for the 2016 Kentucky Derby.

Uncle Mo and broodmare sire, Forestry, both never won beyond 8.5 furlongs. This pattern of speed over speed, along with several statistical measures used to help classify a horse's pedigree, once again raised concerns about Nyquist's stamina. For example, Nyquist has a dosage profile (DP) of 1–2–1–0–0, which reflects that the two most prominent sires in his pedigree, Mr. Prospector and Storm Cat, are considered speed influences. Kentucky Derby winner Pleasant Colony is the only "classic" influence in the first four generations of Nyquist's pedigree. The resultant Dosage Index (DI) is 7.00.

On the other hand, Nyquist's female family has many stamina influences that appear farther back in the pedigree. For example, Ribot, who twice won the Arc de Triomphe, appears twice in Seeking Gabrielle's pedigree. Like 2015 Triple Crown winner American Pharoah, Nyquist is a 5th generation descendant of Triple Crown winner Secretariat through Terlingua.

Pedigree of Nyquist, bay colt, foaled March 10, 2013
Sire Uncle Mo b. 2008	Indian Charlie b. 1995	In Excess (IRE) dkb/br. 1987	Siberian Express
Sire Uncle Mo b. 2008	Indian Charlie b. 1995	In Excess (IRE) dkb/br. 1987	Kantado
Sire Uncle Mo b. 2008	Indian Charlie b. 1995	Soviet Sojourn b. 1989	Leo Castelli
Sire Uncle Mo b. 2008	Indian Charlie b. 1995	Soviet Sojourn b. 1989	Political Parfait
Sire Uncle Mo b. 2008	Playa Maya dkb/br. 2000	Arch dkb/br. 1995	Kris S.
Sire Uncle Mo b. 2008	Playa Maya dkb/br. 2000	Arch dkb/br. 1995	Aurora
Sire Uncle Mo b. 2008	Playa Maya dkb/br. 2000	Dixie Slippers dkb/br. 1995	Dixieland Band
Sire Uncle Mo b. 2008	Playa Maya dkb/br. 2000	Dixie Slippers dkb/br. 1995	Cyane's Slippers
Dam Seeking Gabrielle ch. 2007	Forestry b. 1996	Storm Cat dkb/br. 1983	Storm Bird
Dam Seeking Gabrielle ch. 2007	Forestry b. 1996	Storm Cat dkb/br. 1983	Terlingua
Dam Seeking Gabrielle ch. 2007	Forestry b. 1996	Shared Interest b. 1988	Pleasant Colony
Dam Seeking Gabrielle ch. 2007	Forestry b. 1996	Shared Interest b. 1988	Surgery
Dam Seeking Gabrielle ch. 2007	Seeking Regina ch. 1992	Seeking the Gold b. 1985	Mr. Prospector
Dam Seeking Gabrielle ch. 2007	Seeking Regina ch. 1992	Seeking the Gold b. 1985	Con Game
Dam Seeking Gabrielle ch. 2007	Seeking Regina ch. 1992	Fulbright Scholar ch. 1985	Cox's Ridge
Dam Seeking Gabrielle ch. 2007	Seeking Regina ch. 1992	Fulbright Scholar ch. 1985	Matriculation (Family 6-f)
