= 2014 Road to the Kentucky Derby =

The 2014 Road to the Kentucky Derby /ˈdɜːrbi/ was a series of races in which horses earned points to qualify for the 2014 Kentucky Derby. The points system replaced the previous qualifying method that looked at earnings in hundreds of graded stakes races worldwide. The series is divided into two phases, the Kentucky Derby Prep Season and the Kentucky Derby Championship Series.

The top 20 point earners earned a spot in the Kentucky Derby starting gate. Up to 24 horses could enter the race and four horses can be listed as "also eligible" and would be ranked in order accordingly in case any horse(s) be scratched prior to the race. If two or more horses have the same number of points, the tiebreaker to get into the race will be earnings in non-restricted stakes races, whether or not they are graded. In the event of a tie, those horses will divide equally the points they would have received jointly had one beaten the other. Horses listed as "also eligible" are not allowed to participate in the race once wagering is opened.

The 2014 season consisted of 34 races, 17 races for the Kentucky Derby Prep Season and 17 races for the Kentucky Derby Championship Season.

== Standings ==
Standings
Rank	Horse	Points	Owner	Trainer	Earnings	Refs
**1**	**California Chrome**	**150**	**Steven Coburn and Perry Martin**	**Art Sherman**	**$782,250**
2	Vicar's in Trouble	120	Kenneth & Sarah Ramsey	Michael J. Maker	$760,000
3	Dance With Fate	108	Sharon Alesia, Bran Jam Stable and Ciaglia Racing	Peter Eurton	$600,000
4	Wicked Strong	102	Centennial Farms	James Jerkens	$640,000
---	Toast of New York	100	Michael Buckley	Jamie Osborne	$1,200,000
5	Samraat	100	My Meadowview Farm	Richard Violette Jr.	$650,000
6	Danza	100	S. Alesia, Bran Jam Stable or Ciaglia Racing, LLC	Peter Eurton	$620,000
---	Constitution	100	Twin Creeks Racing Stables LLC & WinStar Farm LLC	Todd Pletcher	$600,000
7	Hoppertunity	95	Karl Watson, Mike Pegram & Paul Weitman	Bob Baffert	$576,000
8	Intense Holiday	93	Starlight Racing (Jack & Laurie Wolf, Donald & Barbara Lucarelli)	Todd Pletcher	$527,500
9	Wildcat Red	90	Honors Stable Corp. (Salvatore Delfino)	Jose Garrofalo	$665,000
10	We Miss Artie	60	Kenneth & Sarah Ramsey	Todd Pletcher	$544,000
11	Ride On Curlin	55	Daniel J. Dougherty	William Gowan	$354,387
12	Chitu	54	Tanma Corp	Bob Baffert	$440,000
13	Tapiture	52	Ron Winchell	Steven Asmussen	$470,738
---	Midnight Hawk	52	Hill 'n' Dale Equine Holdings, Inc.	Bob Baffert	$420,000
---	Ring Weekend	50	St. Elias Stable & West Point Thoroughbreds	H. Graham Motion	$260,000
---	Asmar-IRE	40	Fawzi Abdulla Nass	Fawzi Abdulla Nass	$557,500
14	General a Rod	40	J. Armando Rodriguez	Michael J. Maker	$240,000
15	Medal Count	40	Spendthrift Farm	Dale Romans	$226,500
---	Albano	34	Brereton C. Jones	J. Larry Jones	$190,000
16	Candy Boy	30	C R K Stable	John Sadler	$380,000
---	Cairo Prince	24	Godolphin, Namcook Stables, Braverman, Clarke, Robertson	Kiaran McLaughlin	$520,000
17	Uncle Sigh	24	Wounded Warrior Stables & Anthony C. Robertson	Gary Contessa	$180,000
---	Emirates Flyer-GB	20	Hamdan bin Mohammed Al Maktoum	Saeed bin Suroor	$381,691
18	Vinceremos	20	WinStar Farm & Twin Creeks Racing Stables LLC	Todd Pletcher	$191,666
19	Harry's Holiday	20	Skychai Racing LLC, Terry Raymond & Jana Wagner	Michael J. Maker	$152,622
20	Commanding Curve	20	West Point Thoroughbreds (Terry Finley et al.)	Dallas Stewart	$104,000
21	Pablo Del Monte	20	Susan Magnier, Derrick Smith, Michael Tabor, Wesley Ward	Wesley Ward	$102,000
---	Bayern	20	Kaleem Shah	Bob Baffert	$100,000
---	Social Inclusion	20	Rontos Racing Stable Corp	Manny Azpurua	$100,000
---	Havana	14	Michael Tabor, Susan Magnier, Derrick Smith	Todd Pletcher	$660,000
---	Honor Code	14	Lane's End Racing & Dell Ridge Farm	C. R. McGaughey III	$340,000
22	Big Bazinga	14	Derby Dreamers Racing Stable (Robert S. Bates)	Katerina Vassilieva	$92,149
---	Kristo	14	Hronis Racing LLC	John Sadler	$76,000
23	Coastline	13	John C. Oxley	Mark Casse	$131,346
---	Tamarando	12	Mr. & Mrs. Larry D. Williams	Jerry Hollendorfer	$495,000
24	Strong Mandate	11	Robert C. Baker & William L. Mack	D. Wayne Lukas	$479,166
---	Bond Holder	11	Reddam Racing	Doug O'Neill	$333,000
---	Ami's Holiday	11	Ivan Dalos	Josie Carroll	$146,145
---	New Year's Day	10	Mary & Gary West	Bob Baffert	$1,100,000
---	Rise Up	10	Paul & Andrena Van Doren	Tom Amoss	$786,633
---	Giovanni Boldini	10	Susan Magnier, Michael Tabor, Derrick Smith	Aidan O'Brien	$345,678
---	Mr Speaker	10	Phipps Stable	C. R. McGaughey III	$210,000
25	In Trouble	10	Team D	Tony Dutrow	$190,000
26	Noble Moon	10	Treadway Racing Stable (Jeff Treadway)	Leah Gyarmati	$149,000
27	Cleburne	10	Donegal Racing	Dale Romans	$127,044
---	Tanzanite Cat	10	James L. & Ywachetta H. Driver	Code Autrey	$111,000
28	Commissioner	10	WinStar Farm LLC	Todd Pletcher	$110,667
---	Dublin Up	10	Donegal Raing	Peter Miller	$60,000
29	Schivarelli	10	Pike Place Racing & Homewrecker Racing LLC	Eddie Kenneally	$40,000
---	Top Billing	10	William S. Farish III & Edward J. Hudson Jr.	C. R. McGaughey III	$40,000
---	Surfing U S A	10	George Bolton & Stonestreet Stables LLC (Barbara Banke)	Todd Pletcher	$35,000
30	Conquest Titan	9	Conquest Stables	Mark Casse	$210,945
31	Casiguapo	5	All American Horses	Mario Morales	$272,717
---	Rebranded	5	Tony Pennington	Justin R. Evans	$137,280
---	Financial Mogul	5	Klaravich Stables Inc. & William H. Lawrence	Richard Violette Jr.	$95,000
---	East Hall	5	H. Jack Hendricks & Roger Justice	Bill Kaplan	$77,550
---	Classic Giacnroll	5	Lisa Guerrero & Joseph E. Besecker	Lisa Guerrero	$62,500
32	Asserting Bear	5	Bear Stables LTD	Reade Baker	$33,099
---	Schoolofhardrocks	5	Amerman Racing LLC	David Hofmans	$18,000
---	Smarty's Echo	4	Windy Hill Farm	Anne Smith	$82,000
---	Walt	4	Black Hawk Stable	Chris Hartman	$45,857
---	Laddie Boy	4	Kevin Jacobsen	Chuck Peery	$45,599
---	Scotland	4	Harvey A. Clarke	Tony Dutrow	$40,000
---	Divine Oath	4	Let's Go Stable	Todd Pletcher	$40,000
---	Smart Cover	4	Donegal Racing	Dale Romans	$38,418
---	Go Greeley	2	J.R. Racing Stable	John Ross	$220,601
---	Enterprising	2	Glen Hill Farms (Jerry Crawford et al.)	Thomas F. Proctor	$91,100
---	Roman Unbridled	2	Michelle Y. Brown	Chad Cook	$113,000
---	Rankhasprivileges	2	Magdalena Racing	Kenneth McPeek	$100,250
---	Ontology	2	Reddam Racing	Simon Callaghan	$77,250
---	Arctic Slope	2	Shortleaf Stable	Kenneth McPeek	$47,252
---	Gold Hawk	2	Winchell Thoroughbreds	Steven Asmussen	$38,000
---	Supermonic	2	Eclipse Thoroughbred Partners (Aron Wellman)	Todd Pletcher	$20,000
---	Awesome Sky	2	John C. Oxley	Mark Casse	$16,819
---	Can the Man	1	Kaleem Shah	Bob Baffert	$110,000
---	Diamond Bachelor	1	Diamond 100 Racing Club LLC, et al.	Patrick L. Biancone	$92,000
---	Matuszak	1	George J. Prussin	William Mott	$22,667
---	Rum Point	1	Reddam Racing	Doug O'Neill	$30,250
---	Almost Famous	1	Chuck & Maribeth Sandford	Patrick B. Byrne	$28,579
---	Puppy Manners	1	Jerry Hollendorfer, William E. Myers Jr., & George Todaro	Jerry Hollendorfer	$18,250
---	Son of a Preacher	1	Terra Di Sienna Stables	W. Bret Calhoun	$11,500
---	Buck Magic	1	Katherine Ball	Ben Colebrook	$8,410
---	I'll Wrap It Up	1	Daniel Kramer	Doug O'Neill	$6,000
Entrants for Kentucky Derby in blue; "Also eligible" for Kentucky Derby in green; Sidelined/Inactive/No longer under Derby Consideration/Not Triple Crown nominated in gray; Winner of Kentucky Derby in **bold**

== Series results ==
Prep season
Note: 1st=10 points; 2nd=4 points; 3rd=2 points; 4th=1 point
Race	Distance	Surface	Purse	Track	Date	1st	2nd	3rd	4th	Ref
Iroquois	1-1/16 miles	Dirt	$150,000	Churchill Downs	Sep 7 2013	Cleburne	Smart Cover	Tapiture	Ride On Curlin	
FrontRunner	1-1/16 miles	Dirt	$250,000	Santa Anita	Sep 28 2013	Bond Holder	Dance With Fate	Tamarando	Can the Man	
Breeders' Futurity	1-1/16 miles	Synthetic	$400,000	Keeneland	Oct 5 2013	We Miss Artie	Smarty's Echo	Arctic Slope	Rum Point	
Champagne	1-mile	Dirt	$400,000	Belmont	Oct 5 2013	Havana	Honor Code	Ride On Curlin	Casiguapo	
Grey	1-1/16 miles	Synthetic	$229,677	Woodbine	Oct 6 2013	Ami's Holiday	Big Bazinga	Go Greeley	Give No Quarter (Note: Give No Quarter did not finish the race and was awarded no points.)	
Breeders' Cup Juvenile	1-1/16 miles	Dirt	$2,000,000	Santa Anita	Nov 2 2013	New Year's Day	Havana	Strong Mandate	Bond Holder	
Delta Downs Jackpot	1-1/16 miles	Dirt	$1,000,000	Delta Downs	Nov 23 2013	Rise Up	Casiguapo	Rankhasprivileges	Roman Unbridled	
Remsen	1-1/8 miles	Dirt	$250,000	Aqueduct	Nov 30 2013	Honor Code	Cairo Prince	Wicked Strong	Intense Holiday	
Kentucky Jockey Club	1-1/16 miles	Dirt	$177,150	Churchill Downs	Nov 30 2013	Tapiture	Laddie Boy	Awesome Sky	Buck Magic	
Jerome	1-mile 70 yards	Dirt	$200,000	Aqueduct	Jan 4 2014	Noble Moon	Classic Giacnroll	Scotland	Matuszak	
Sham	1-mile	Dirt	$100,000	Santa Anita	Jan 11 2014	Midnight Hawk	Kristo	Ontology	I'll Wrap It Up	
Lecomte	1-mile 70 yards	Dirt	$200,000	Fair Grounds	Jan 18 2014	Vicar's in Trouble	Albano	Gold Hawk	Roman Unbridled	
Smarty Jones	1-mile	Dirt	$150,000	Oaklawn	Jan 20 2014	Tanzanite Cat	Walt	Coastline	Son of a Preacher	
Holy Bull	1-1/16 miles	Dirt	$400,000	Gulfstream	Jan 25 2014	Cairo Prince	Conquest Titan	Intense Holiday	Almost Famous	
Withers	1-1/16 miles	Dirt	$200,000	Aqueduct	Feb 1 2014	Samraat	Uncle Sigh	Scotland	Classic Giacnroll	
Robert B. Lewis	1-1/16 miles	Dirt	$200,000	Santa Anita	Feb 8 2014	Candy Boy	Chitu	Midnight Hawk	Diamond Bachelor	
El Camino Real Derby	1-1/8 miles	Synthetic	$200,000	Golden Gate	Feb 15 2014	Tamarando	Dance With Fate	Enterprising	Puppy Manners	
Southwest	1-1/16 miles	Dirt	$300,000	Oaklawn	Feb 17 2014	Tapiture	Strong Mandate	Ride On Curlin	Coastline	

Championship series
First leg of series
Race	Distance	Surface	Purse	Track	Date	1st	2nd	3rd	4th	Ref
Fountain of Youth	1-1/16 miles	Dirt	$400,000	Gulfstream	Feb 22 2014	Wildcat Red	General a Rod	Top Billing	East Hall	
Risen Star	1-1/16 miles	Dirt	$400,000	Fair Grounds	Feb 22 2014	Intense Holiday	Albano	Vicar's In Trouble	Hoppertunity	
Gotham	1-1/16 miles	Dirt	$400,000	Aqueduct	Mar 1 2014	Samraat	Uncle Sigh	In Trouble	Financial Mogul	
Tampa Bay Derby	1-1/16 miles	Dirt	$350,000	Tampa Bay Downs	Mar 8 2014	Ring Weekend	Vinceremos	Surfing U S A	Conquest Titan	
San Felipe	1-1/16 miles	Dirt	$300,000	Santa Anita	Mar 8 2014	California Chrome	Midnight Hawk	Kristo	Schoolofhardrocks	
Rebel	1-1/16 miles	Dirt	$600,000	Oaklawn	Mar 15 2014	Hoppertunity	Tapiture	Ride On Curlin	Strong Mandate	
Spiral	1-1/8 miles	Synthetic	$550,000	Turfway	Mar 22 2014	We Miss Artie	Harry's Holiday	Coastline	Asserting Bear	
Sunland Derby	1-1/8 miles	Dirt	$800,000	Sunland	Mar 23 2014	Chitu	Midnight Hawk	Commissioner	Rebranded	
Note: 1st=50 points; 2nd=20 points; 3rd=10 points; 4th=5 points
Second leg of series
Race	Distance	Surface	Purse	Track	Date	1st	2nd	3rd	4th	Ref
Florida Derby	1-1/8 miles	Dirt	$1,000,000	Gulfstream	Mar 29 2014	Constitution	Wildcat Red	General a Rod	Cairo Prince	
Louisiana Derby	1-1/8 miles	Dirt	$1,000,000	Fair Grounds	Mar 29 2014	Vicar's in Trouble	Intense Holiday	Commanding Curve	Albano	
UAE Derby	1-3/16 miles	Synthetic	$2,000,000	Meydan	Mar 29 2014	Toast of New York	Asmar	Emirates Flyer	Giovanni Boldini	
Wood Memorial	1-1/8 miles	Dirt	$1,000,000	Aqueduct	Apr 5 2014	Wicked Strong	Samraat	Strong Inclusion	Schivarelli	
Santa Anita Derby	1-1/8 miles	Dirt	$750,000	Santa Anita	Apr 5 2014	California Chrome	Hoppertunity	Candy Boy	Dublin Up	
Arkansas Derby	1-1/8 miles	Dirt	$1,000,000	Oaklawn Park	Apr 12 2014	Danza	Ride On Curlin	Bayern	Tapiture	
Blue Grass	1-1/8 miles	Synthetic	$750,000	Keeneland	Apr 12 2014	Dance With Fate	Medal Count	Pablo Del Monte	Big Bazinga	
Note: 1st=100 points; 2nd=40 points; 3rd=20 points; 4th=10 points
"Wild Card"
Race	Distance	Surface	Grade	Track	Date	1st	2nd	3rd	4th	Ref
Lexington	1-1/16 miles	Synthetic	$200,000	Keeneland	Apr 19 2014	Mr Speaker	Divine Oath	Supermonic	Ami's Holiday	
Note: 1st=10 points; 2nd=4 points; 3rd=2 points; 4th=1 points

== See also ==
- Road to the Kentucky Oaks
