= 2014 in equestrianism =

== Dressage ==
- March 21, 2013 – March 23, 2014: 2013–14 FEI World Cup Dressage
  - 2013–14 Western European League winner: (Sweden) Tinne Vilhelmson-Silfvén
  - 2013–14 Central European League winner: (Russia) Tatiana Dorofeeva
  - 2013–14 North American League winner: (Denmark) Lars Petersen
  - 2013–14 Asia / Pacific League winner: (Australia) Mary Hanna
- April 17 – 21: 2014 Reem Acra FEI World Cup Final at (France) Lyon
  - Winner of both the Grand Prix and Grand Prix Freestyle: (United Kingdom) Charlotte Dujardin (with horse Valego)

== Show jumping ==
- March 27, 2013 – March 23, 2014: 2013–14 FEI World Cup Jumping
  - 2013–14 Western European League winner: (Germany) Marcus Ehning
  - 2013–14 Arab League winner: (Morocco) Abdelkebir Ouaddar
  - 2013–14 Australian League winner: (Australia) Jamie Kermond
  - 2013–14 Caucasian League winner: (Azerbaijan) Jamal Rahimov
  - 2013–14 Central America and Caribbean Islands League winner: (Colombia) Manuel Espinosa Pla
  - 2013–14 Central Asian League winner: (Uzbekistan) Umid Kamilov
  - 2013–14 Chinese League winner: (China) Liu Tongyan
  - 2013–14 Japan League winner: Tae Sato
  - 2013–14 New Zealand League winner: Samantha McIntosh
  - 2013–14 North America East Coast League winner: (United States) Kent Farrington
  - 2013–14 North America West Coast League winner: (Egypt) Nayel Nassar
  - 2013–14 South African League winner: (South Africa) Jeanne Engela
  - 2013–14 South American North League winner: (Colombia) Juan Manuel Gallego
  - 2013–14 South American South League winner: (Brazil) Yuri Mansur Guerios
  - 2013–14 South East Asian League winner: (India) Kurniadi Katompo
- April 17 – 21: 2014 Longines FEI World Cup Jumping Final at (France) Lyon
  - Winner: (Germany) Daniel Deusser (with horse Cornet d'Amour)
- April 24 – November 15: The 2014 Longines Global Champions Tour
  - April 24 – 27 at (Belgium) Antwerp
    - Class 05: Antwerp 2014 CSI5* 1.60m (main GCT event) winner: (United States) McLain Ward (with horse Rothchild)
  - May 2 – 4 at (Spain) Madrid
    - Class 10: Madrid 2014 CSI5* 1.60m (main GCT event) winner: (Netherlands) Maikel van der Vleuten (with horse VDL Groep Verdi)
  - May 29 – June 1 at (Germany) Hamburg
    - Class 06: Hamburg 2014 CSI5* 1.60m (main GCT event) winner: (Germany) Katrin Eckermann (with horse Firth of Lorne)
  - June 6 – 8 at (China) Shanghai
    - Class 04: Shanghai 2014 CSI5* 1.60m (main GCT event) winner: (Belgium) Pieter Devos (with horse Dream of India Greenfield)
  - June 12 – 14 at (France) Cannes
    - Class 14: Cannes 2014 CSI5* 1.60m (main GCT event) winner: (United Kingdom) Scott Brash (with horse Hello Sanctos)
  - June 26 – 28 at Monaco
    - Class 05: Monaco CSI5* 1.60m (main GCT event) winner: (Qatar) Bassem Hassan Mohammed (with horse Victoria)
  - July 4 – 6 at (France) Paris
    - Class 11: Paris 2014 CSI5* 1.60m (main GCT event) winner: (France) Kevin Staut (with horse Silvana*HDC)
  - July 10 – 12 at (Portugal) Cascais, Estoril
    - Class 04: Cascais 2014 CSI5* 1.60m (main GCT event) winner: (United Kingdom) Scott Brash (with horse Hello Sanctos)
  - July 25 – 27 at (France) Chantilly, Oise
    - Class 04: Chantilly 2014 CSI5* 1.60m (main GCT event) winner: (Sweden) Rolf-Göran Bengtsson (with horse Casall Ask)
  - August 1 – 3 at (Netherlands) Valkenswaard
    - Class 04: Valkenswaard 2014 CSI5* 1.60m (main GCT event) winner: (Germany) Christian Ahlmann (with horse Codex One)
  - August 14 – 16 at (United Kingdom) London
    - Class 14: London 2014 - CSI5* - 1.60 m (main GCT event) winner: (United Kingdom) Scott Brash (with horse Hello Sanctos)
  - September 12 – 14 at (Switzerland) Lausanne
    - Class 10: Lausanne 2014 CSI5* 1.60m (main GCT event) winner: (Germany) Ludger Beerbaum (with horse Chaman)
  - September 18 – 21 at (Austria) Vienna
    - Class 04: Vienna 2014 CSI5* 1.60m (main GCT event) winner: (Germany) Marcus Ehning (with horse Plot Blue)
  - November 13 – 15 at (Qatar) Doha (final)
    - Class 05: Doha 2014 CSI5* 1.60m (main GCT event) winner: (Sweden) Rolf-Göran Bengtsson (with horse Casall Ask)
- Overall winner of the 2014 LGCT: (United Kingdom) Scott Brash (with horse Hello Sanctos)
- June 4 – September 14: The Spruce Meadows Tournaments in Calgary
  - June 4 – 8: The "National"
    - Biggest purse: The C$400,000 Royal Bank of Canada (RBC) Grand Prix Presented by Rolex event.
      - Winner: (Mexico) Jaime Azcarraga (with horse Anton)
  - June 12 – 15: The "Continental"
    - Biggest purse: The C$210,000 CP Grand Prix event.
      - Winner: (United States) McLain Ward (with horse Rothchild)
  - June 26 – 29: The "Canada One"
    - Biggest purse: The C$125,000 Imperial Challenge event.
      - Winner: (Mexico) Nicolas Pizzaro Suarez (with horse Colasko)
  - July 2 – 6: The "North American"
    - Biggest purse: The C$210,000 Cenovus Energy Classic (Derby) event.
      - Winner: (Venezuela) Angel Karolyi (with horse Indiana 127)
  - July 10 – 13: The "Pan American"
    - Biggest purse: The C$400,000 Pan American Cup Presented by Rolex event.
      - Winner: (United States) Kent Farrington (with horse Uceko)
  - September 10 – 14: The "Masters"
    - FEI C$300,000 BMO Nations' Cup -> Champions: Canada; Second: United States; Third: Belgium
    - C$1.5 million CP International winner: (Canada) Ian Millar (with horse Dixson)

== Thoroughbred horse racing ==
Triple Crown (US)

- May 3: 2014 Kentucky Derby
  - Winner: California Chrome (horse); (Mexico) Victor Espinoza (jockey); Art Sherman (trainer)
- May 17: 2014 Preakness Stakes
  - Winner: California Chrome (horse); (Mexico) Victor Espinoza (jockey); Art Sherman (trainer)
- June 7: 2014 Belmont Stakes
  - Winner: (Kentucky) Tonalist (horse); (Dominican Republic) Joel Rosario (jockey); (France) Christophe Clement (trainer)

Triple Crown (Canada)

- July 6: Queen's Plate
  - Winner: Lexie Lou (horse); (Barbados) Patrick Husbands (jockey); Mark Casse (trainer)
- July 29: Prince of Wales Stakes
  - Winner: Coltimus Prime (horse); (Brazil) Eurico Rosa da Silva (jockey); Justin J. Nixon (trainer)
- August 17: Breeders' Stakes
  - Winner: Ami's Holiday (horse); Luis Contreras (jockey); (Canada) Josie Carroll (trainer)

English Triple Crown (UK)

- May 3: 2,000 Guineas Stakes
  - Winner: (Republic of Ireland) Night of Thunder (horse); (Republic of Ireland) Kieren Fallon (jockey); (United Kingdom) Richard Hannon Jr. (trainer)
- June 7: 2014 Epsom Derby
  - Winner: (United Kingdom) Australia (horse); (Republic of Ireland) Joseph O'Brien (jockey); (Republic of Ireland) Aidan O'Brien (trainer)
- September 13: St. Leger Stakes
  - Winner: (United Kingdom) Kingston Hill (horse); (Italy) Andrea Atzeni (jockey); (United Kingdom) Roger Varian (trainer)

Australian Triple Crown

- March 15: Randwick Guineas
  - Winner: Dissident (horse); (New Zealand) Jim Cassidy (jockey); Peter Moody (trainer)
- March 29: Rosehill Guineas
  - Winner: Criterion (horse); Hugh Bowman (jockey); David Payne (trainer)
- April 12: Australian Derby
  - Winner: Criterion (horse); Hugh Bowman (jockey); David Payne (trainer)

== Other equine events ==
- August 19 – 24: 2014 Summer Youth Olympics
  - Team Jumping: (gold) Europe; (silver) South America; (bronze) North America
  - Individual Jumping: (gold) (New Zealand) Emily Fraser; (silver) (Argentina) Martina Campi; (bronze) (Australia) Jake Hunter
- August 23 – September 7: 2014 FEI World Equestrian Games at the (France) Normandy region, centered around the city of Caen
  - Great Britain won the gold medal tally. The Netherlands won the overall medal tally.
- October 31 – November 2: FEI South American Championships 2014 in Barretos
  - Open Individual Eventing winner: (Brazil) Henrique Plombon Pinheiro
  - Open Team Eventing winners: Brazil (Henrique Plombon Pinheiro, Serguei Fofanoff, André Paro, Márcio Jorge)
