= 2014 Belmont Stakes =

American horse race

146th Belmont Stakes
- Belmont Stakes
- "The Test of the Champion"
- Location: Belmont Park; Elmont, New York, United States
- Date: June 7, 2014
- Distance: 1 1/2 mi (12 furlongs; 2,414 m)
- Winning horse: Tonalist
- Winning time: 2:28.52
- Final odds: 9.20 (to 1)
- Jockey: Joel Rosario
- Trainer: Christophe Clement
- Owner: Robert S. Evans
- Conditions: Fast
- Surface: Dirt
- Attendance: 102,199

The 2014 Belmont Stakes was the 146th running of the Belmont Stakes. It was run on June 7, 2014, and was televised on NBC. California Chrome had a chance to complete the third leg of the Triple Crown after his victories in the 2014 Kentucky Derby and the 2014 Preakness Stakes. However, it was Tonalist who won the race. Commissioner placed second and Medal Count took third. California Chrome finished in a tie for fourth with Wicked Strong.

The purse money for the Belmont was $1,500,000, an increase of $500,000 from the 2013 race. Attendance of 102,199 was the third highest in Belmont Stakes history. The 2014 race set a record for the New York Racing Association (NYRA) for the amount of money bet, with an on-track handle of $19,105,877 and all-sources handle of $150,249,399. It had the second-highest television viewership to the 2004 broadcast.

== Field ==
The only three horses to contest all three legs of the Triple Crown were Kentucky Derby and Preakness Stakes winner California Chrome, Ride On Curlin, and General a Rod. Returning from the Kentucky Derby, having skipped the Preakness, were Commanding Curve (who was second in the Derby), Wicked Strong, Medal Count, and Samraat. "New shooters" who had not run in either of the previous Triple Crown races included Tonalist, Matterhorn, Matuszak, and Commissioner. Tonalist and Commissioner had run first and second at Belmont Park in the Peter Pan Stakes. Matterhorn had run fourth in that race.

Derby runners Danza and Intense Holiday were anticipated to run but for various reasons did not. Preakness runners Kid Cruz and Social Inclusion were other possible runners who were not entered.

== Race description ==
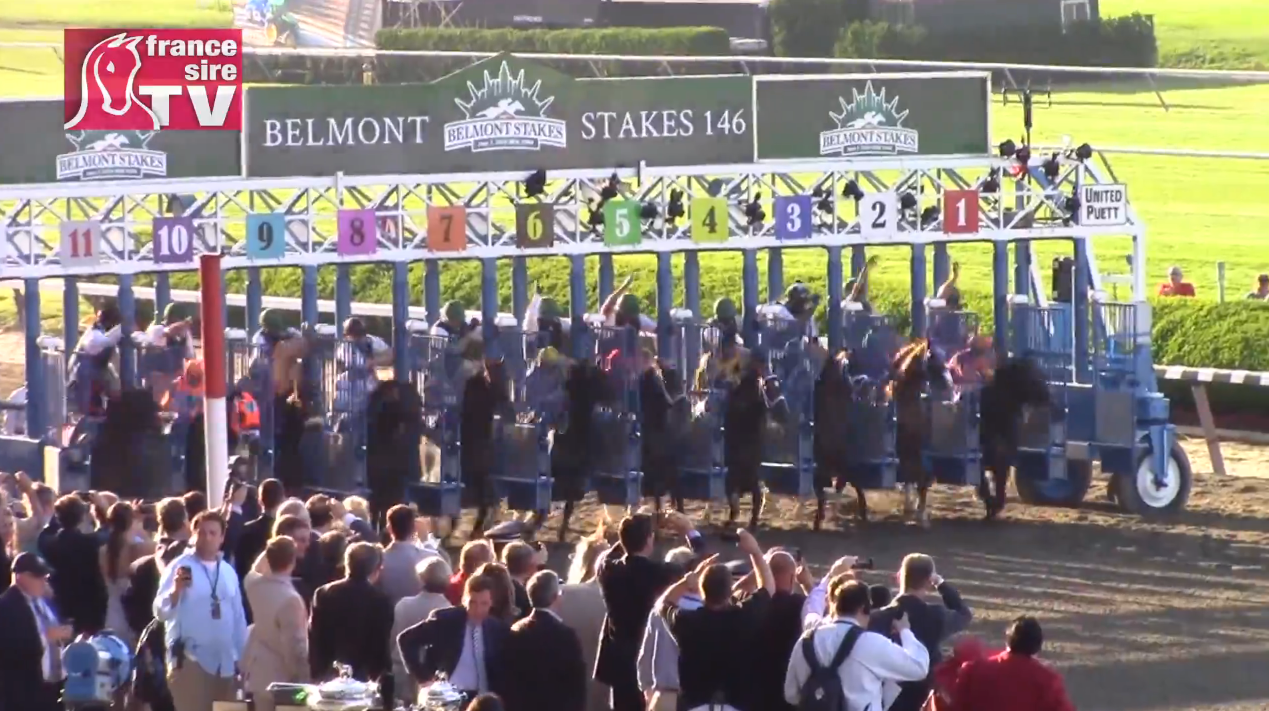
Start of the 2014 Belmont Stakes

Morning line favorite California Chrome stumbled slightly out of the gate and bumped with another horse in his bid to become the first horse to win the Triple Crown since 1978. Commissioner and General a Rod challenged for the early lead and jockey Victor Espinoza elected to ease California Chrome into third place at the first rail. California Chrome stayed back, falling to fourth then fifth as the race went on. Entering the final turn, he went outside of a surging Tonalist as the race went four horses wide. Espinoza pressed the horse, but California Chrome was unable to gain ground.

Entering the home stretch Commissioner was still in the lead. However, Tonalist continued to surge and beat Commissioner to the line by a head, with a winning time of 2:28.52. A slight surge brought California Chrome into a dead heat for fourth with Wicked Strong, but left him 1.5 lengths behind the winner. Medal Count placed third, a length back from Tonalist. Most of the crowd had hoped to see California Chrome win and sat quietly when the race ended. Winning jockey Joel Rosario said the win was bittersweet as he had been rooting for California Chrome to win the Triple Crown. Tonalist had last raced in the Peter Pan Stakes on May 10, a race he won at Belmont Park, and was making just his fifth career start. He became the first horse to win the Peter Pan/Belmont double since A.P. Indy in 1992.

California Chrome's loss extended the longest Triple Crown drought in history. He became the twelfth straight horse to fail in the Belmont after winning the first two legs of the contest. (A thirteenth horse, I’ll Have Another, did not compete in the Belmont due to injury.) Espinoza felt that something wasn't right with California Chrome when the horse didn't break boldly, and he held the horse back a bit instead of going to the lead. Midway through the race he took the horse to the outside to give him running room, but the horse did not unleash his usual burst of speed. "As soon as he came out of the gate, he wasn't the same", Espinoza remarked after the race. Initial post-race analysts thought that California Chrome had stepped on his own feet, or "grabbed a quarter" in equestrian parlance, as he had some blood on his right front heel. Further review of the video and photos of the race showed that the horse next to him, Matterhorn, accidentally stepped on California Chrome as both horses broke from the gate. As a result, he had run the race with a "chunk" of tissue taken out of his right front heel, and also had a cut on his tendon that was not serious. Trainer Art Sherman said that both injuries would heal, probably in two or three weeks, but after that, he wanted to turn out California Chrome on pasture for a rest period of six or seven weeks, adding "Hey listen, we'll be here to fight another day, I'm just happy he's all in one piece."

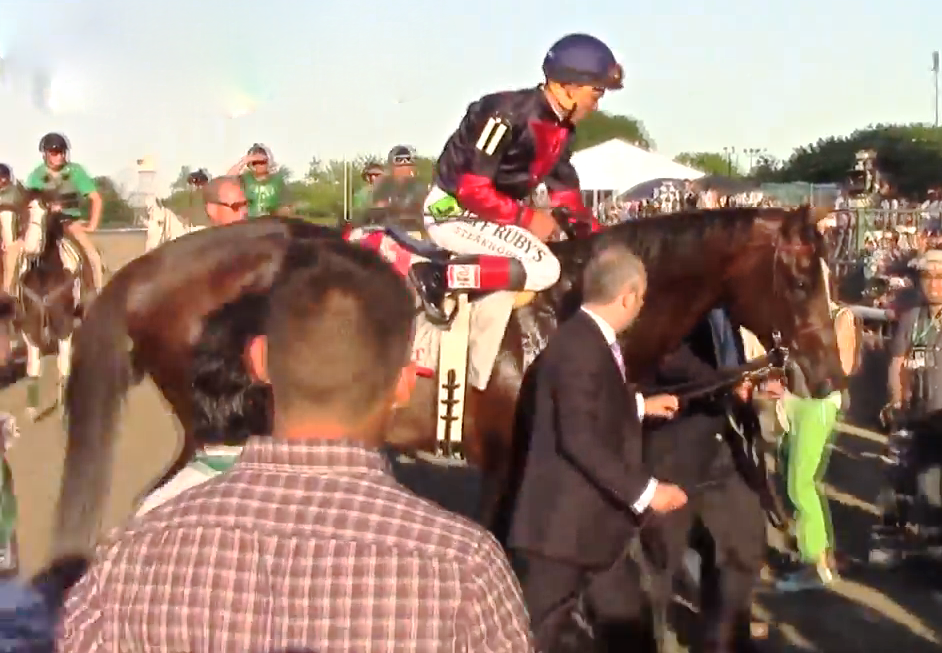
Tonalist, winner of the 2014 Belmont Stakes, after the race, Joel Rosario up

After the race, California Chrome co-owner Steve Coburn said the horses who had not taken part in the Kentucky Derby or Preakness Stakes took "the coward's way out". He predicted he would not see another Triple Crown winner in his lifetime due to fresh horses coming in at each stage of the contest; including Tonalist, six of the last eight Belmont winners did not compete in the first two legs of the Triple Crown. Two days later, he apologized for the remarks, saying he wanted to tell the owners of Tonalist, "Congratulations, you've got a fantastic horse ... He won the race fair and square. He deserved to win."

Other horses and their connections generated assorted pre- and post-race drama. Dale Romans, trainer of third-place finisher Medal Count, expressed concern that General a Rod, who finished seventh, was late to the test barn prior to the race, and that trainer Michael Maker had given the horse an unfair advantage by doing so. Romans thought the late arrival should have been penalized by the horse being scratched. However, New York Racing Association officials found that General a Rod completed all pre-race testing and had no unfair advantage. Further, spotty cell phone service and other communication glitches contributed to the confusion. Ride On Curlin, who was one of the other horses to contest all three legs of the Triple Crown, was eased in the stretch because he began bleeding from his lungs; he did not finish the race. Trainer Billy Gowan later said the severity was a "three out of 10", and that the horse recovered from the race eating well and with sound legs, but that he would give the horse a rest for at least 30 to 45 days.

== Attendance, entertainment, and betting handle ==
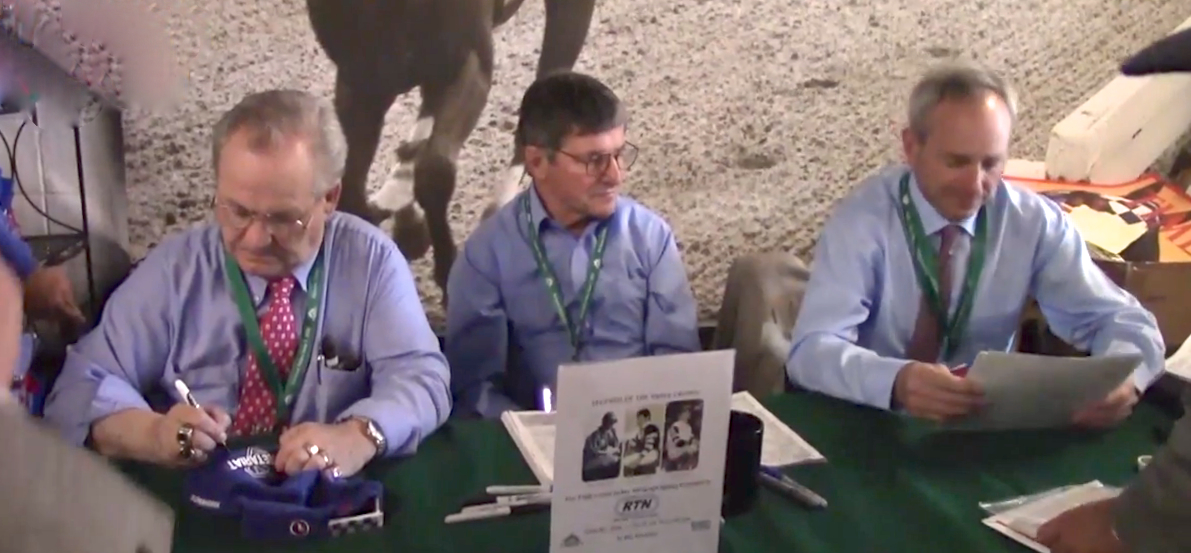
Triple Crown-winning jockeys at 2014 Belmont Stakes. Left to right: Ron Turcotte, rider of Secretariat (1973), Jean Cruguet, rider of Seattle Slew (1977), Steve Cauthen, rider of Affirmed (1978)

Attendance of 102,199 was the third highest in Belmont Stakes history, topped only by 2002 and 2004. The 2014 race day featured a total of 10 stakes races and set a record for the New York Racing Association (NYRA) for amount of money bet, with an on-track handle of $19,105,877 and all-sources handle of $150,249,399. The previous record for Belmont Park was set at the Breeders' Cup when it was held there on October 29, 2005, with on-track wagering of $14,742,520 and $124,009,593 for all sources. The previous record for Belmont Stakes day was set in 2004 with 14,461,402 on track and $110,994,390 from all sources.

Entertainers for the day included Frank Sinatra, Jr., singing "New York, New York" live in the post parade, with additional performances by LL Cool J and Dee Riscoli, from the cast of Wicked.

The three living jockeys who have won the Triple Crown—Ron Turcotte, Jean Cruguet, and Steve Cauthen—all attended, the first time all of them had appeared together in a very long time. They signed autographs, and collectively gave entrants the command "Riders up!" at the saddling paddock.

== Payout ==
The 146th Belmont Payout Schedule

Program Number	Horse Name	Win	Place	Show
11	Tonalist	$20.40	$9.60	$7.00
8	Commissioner	-	$23.20	$13.20
1	Medal Count	-	-	$13.20

- $2 Exacta: (11-8) $348.00
- $2 Trifecta: (11-8-1) $6,781.00
- $1 Superfecta: (11-8-1-9) $11,467.00
- $1 Superfecta: (11-8-1-2) $7,616.00

== Full chart ==
The following table includes the result information:

Finish position	Post position	Horse name	Jockey	Trainer	Owner	Morning Line odds	Post Time odds	Winnings
1	11	Tonalist	Joel Rosario	Christophe Clement	Robert S. Evans	8-1	9.2	$800,000
2	8	Commissioner	Javier Castellano	Todd Pletcher	WinStar Farm LLC	20-1	28.0	$280,000
3	1	Medal Count	Robby Albarado	Dale L. Romans	Spendthrift Farm LLC	20-1	24.75	$150,000
4†	2	California Chrome	Victor Espinoza	Art Sherman	Perry Martin & Steve Coburn	3–5*	0.85*	$80,000
4†	9	Wicked Strong	Rajiv Maragh	Jimmy Jerkens	Centennial Farms	6-1	5.3	$80,000
6	7	Samraat	José Ortiz	Rick Violette	My Meadowview Farm	20-1	19.5	$45,000
7	10	General a Rod	Rosie Napravnik	Michael Maker	Skychai Racing LLC & Starlight Racing	20-1	34.0	$35,000
8	3	Matterhorn	Joe Bravo	Todd Pletcher	Eclipse Thoroughbred Partners & Town and Country Farms, Corp	30-1	40.75	$30,000
9	4	Commanding Curve	Shaun Bridgmohan	Dallas Stewart	West Point Thoroughbreds	15-1	8.9	
dnf‡	6	Matuszak	Mike E. Smith	Bill Mott	George J. Prussin	30-1	34.5	
dnf‡	5	Ride On Curlin	John Velazquez	William "Billy" Gowan	Daniel J. Dougherty	12-1	8.30	

Notes:
* Favorite
† Dead heat
‡ Eased

Race Information:

- Winning breeder: Woodslane Farm
- Margins: head, 1 length
- Final time: 2:28.52
- Track: Fast
- Attendance: 102,199

== See also ==
- 2014 Kentucky Derby
- 2014 Preakness Stakes
