= Counting Stars (horse) =

American racehorse

- Breed: Thoroughbred
- Sire: Honor A. P.
- Grandsire: Honor Code
- Dam: Paynterbynumbers
- Damsire: Paynter
- Sex: Filly
- Foaled: March 12, 2023 (age 3); Kentucky, United States
- Country: United States
- Color: Bay
- Breeder: HRH Prince Sultan Bin Mishal Al Saud
- Owner: West Point Thoroughbreds
- Trainer: Mark E. Casse
- Jockey: Irad Ortiz Jr.
- Record: 11: 6-1-2
- Earnings: US$1,732,606

Major wins
- Fantasy Stakes (2026); Acorn Stakes (2026); Coaching Club American Oaks (2026)

Counting Stars (foaled March 12, 2023) is a multiple Grade I American thoroughbred racehorse who won the 2026 Fantasy Stakes; and the first two legs of the New York Triple Tiara, the 2026 Acorn Stakes, and the 2026 Coaching Club American Oaks.

== Background ==
Counting Stars is a bay filly bred by HRH Prince Sultan Bin Mishal Al Saud and foaled in Kentucky. She is trained by Mark E. Casse and owned by West Point Thoroughbreds. She is a part of thoroughbred family 6-e.

== Racing career ==
=== 2025: two-year-old season ===
In 2025, Counting Stars raced 4 times and won 3. She debuted on September 25 at Churchill Downs. Ridden by Irad Ortiz Jr., she finished first, breaking her maiden. Her next race was the Black Type Dorton Myrtlewood Stakes at Keeneland on October 24. Ridden by Irad Ortiz Jr, she finished in 5th. She started in her next race at Oaklawn Park on December 14 in the Black Type Astral Spa Overnight Stakes. She won race, ridden by Francisco Arrieta. She wrapped up her two-year-old season in the Black Type Year's End Stakes also at Oaklawn Park. Once again ridden by Francisco Arrieta, she finished the race in 1st.

=== 2026: three-year-old season ===
Her connections aimed to start her three-year-old season in the Listed Martha Washington Stakes at Oaklawn Park on February 6, a race on the road to the Kentucky Oaks. She began the race as the 3-5 favorite with Francisco Arrieta as her jockey, but out of the 8 horse field, she finished a career worst last. She then was put towards another Kentucky Oaks prep race, the Grade 3 Honeybee Stakes at Oaklawn Park on March 1. She finished 2nd to Explora by three-quarters of a length. After the race, her team prepared her for the Grade 2 Fantasy Stakes at Oaklawn Park. Explora, the horse who had beat her in the Honeybee Stakes, was unable to take part in the race due to a fever. On March 27, ridden by Francisco Arrieta, she made her start in the race. She won by 5 1/2 lengths, with Search Party coming in 2nd.

Her win in the Fantasy Stakes earned her priority entry into the Grade 1 Kentucky Oaks, which her team pointed her towards next. On May 1, she made her start in the Kentucky Oaks at Churchill Downs, ridden by Francisco Arrieta. She broke smoothly, settling comfortably in the pack at around 4th place. She was unable to close the gap in the stretch, and finished 3rd while Always a Runner finished 1st.

After her strong finish in the Kentucky Oaks, she was entered into the Grade 1 Acorn Stakes, the first leg of the current New York Triple Tiara. The race was one of the races that took place during the 2026 Belmont Stakes festival and was held on June 5 at Saratoga Racecourse. Always a Runner, the Kentucky Oaks winner, was the favorite for the race at 9-2 odds while Counting Stars was at 4-5 odds. Ridden by Irad Ortiz Jr., she broke towards the lead, but was slowed down and settled towards the back of the pack at 4th. In the stretch, Always a Runner briefly took the lead. However, Counting Stars overtook her and the other horses to finish by 3 3/4 lengths over Always a Runner.

She was aimed for the second leg of the New York Triple Tiara next, the Grade 1 Coaching Club American Oaks at Saratoga Racecourse on July 25. Always a Runner's team would also enter her in the race, seeking to bounce back from her previous performance in the Acorn Stakes. Ridden by Irad Ortiz Jr., Counting Stars would begin the race at the front of the pack, and would lead for a majority of it. In the stretch, Always a Runner and Counting Stars would briefly duel for the lead, but Counting Stars opened up the gap and won by 4 1/4 lengths.

The day after the Coaching Club American Oaks it was confirmed she was planned to target the Alabama Stakes, the final leg of the New York Triple Tiara. She would place 3rd in the race to My Gun's Loaded, failing her bid.

== Racing statistics ==
The following racing form is based on information available on Equibase.com.

Date	Track	Distance (Note: Race on Dirt)	Race	Grade	Entry	Finish	Time (Note: Official time of winning horse. The time written in grey doesn't belong to Counting Stars.)	Jockey	Winner (Runner-up)
2025 two-year-old season
25 Sep	Churchill Downs	6 1/2f	Maiden		12	1st	1:16.99	Irad Ortiz Jr.	(Fashion Designer)
24 Oct	Keeneland	6f	Dean Dorton Myrtlewood Stakes	BT	6	5th	1:11.80	José Ortiz	A Fine Chardonnay
14 Dec	Oaklawn Park	6f	Astral Spa Overnight Stakes	BT	9	1st	1:11.13	Francisco Arrieta	(Walk Away Kaye)
27 Dec	Oaklawn Park	1m	Year's End Stakes	BT	9	1st	1:38.68	Francisco Arrieta	(Newtown Pike)
2026 three-year-old season
6 Feb	Oaklawn Park	1 1/16m	Martha Washington Stakes	Listed	8	8th	1:45.56	Francisco Arrieta	Search Party
1 Mar	Oaklawn Park	1 1/16m	Honeybee Stakes	GIII	9	2nd	1:43.52	Francisco Arrieta	Explora
27 Mar	Oaklawn Park	1 1/16m	Fantasy Stakes	GII	5	1st	1:44.47	Francisco Arrieta	(Search Party)
1 May	Churchill Downs	1 1/8m	Kentucky Oaks	GI	13	3rd	1:48.82	Francisco Arrieta	Always a Runner
5 Jun	Saratoga	1 1/8m	Acorn Stakes	GI	5	1st	1:48.85	Irad Ortiz Jr.	(Always a Runner)
25 Jul	Saratoga	1 1/8m	Coaching Club American Oaks	GI	7	1st	1:48.98	Irad Ortiz Jr.	(Always a Runner)
22 Aug	Saratoga	1 1/4m	Alabama Stakes	GI	6	3rd	2:04.87	José Ortiz	My Gun's Loaded

== Pedigree ==
Pedigree of Counting Stars, bay filly, (2023)
Sire Honor A. P. (2017)	Honor Code (2011)	A.P. Indy (2001)	Seattle Slew (1974)
Sire Honor A. P. (2017)	Honor Code (2011)	A.P. Indy (2001)	Weekend Surprise (1980)
Sire Honor A. P. (2017)	Honor Code (2011)	Serena's Cat (2001)	Storm Cat (1983)
Sire Honor A. P. (2017)	Honor Code (2011)	Serena's Cat (2001)	Serena's Tune (1998)
Sire Honor A. P. (2017)	Hollywood Story (2001)	Wild Rush (1994)	Wild Again (1980)
Sire Honor A. P. (2017)	Hollywood Story (2001)	Wild Rush (1994)	Rose Park (1986)
Sire Honor A. P. (2017)	Hollywood Story (2001)	Wife for Life (1994)	Dynaformer (1985)
Sire Honor A. P. (2017)	Hollywood Story (2001)	Wife for Life (1994)	Huggle Duggle (1974)
Dam Paynterbynumbers (2016)	Paynter (2009)	Awesome Again (CAN) (1994)	Deputy Minister (CAN) (1979)
Dam Paynterbynumbers (2016)	Paynter (2009)	Awesome Again (CAN) (1994)	Primal Force (1987)
Dam Paynterbynumbers (2016)	Paynter (2009)	Tizso (1995)	Cees Tizzy (1987)
Dam Paynterbynumbers (2016)	Paynter (2009)	Tizso (1995)	Cee's Song (1986)
Dam Paynterbynumbers (2016)	Ruth and Neva (2008)	Cherokee Run (1990)	Runaway Groom (1979)
Dam Paynterbynumbers (2016)	Ruth and Neva (2008)	Cherokee Run (1990)	Cherokee Dame (1980)
Dam Paynterbynumbers (2016)	Ruth and Neva (2008)	Tap For Gold (1997)	Pleasant Tap (1987)
Dam Paynterbynumbers (2016)	Ruth and Neva (2008)	Tap For Gold (1997)	Golden Reef (1987) (family 6-e)
