= Ownership of California Chrome =

Ownership of a racehorse

California Chrome's racing silks

DAP Racing Front

DAP Racing Back

California Chrome, LLC

The ownership of California Chrome during his racing career was held by two entities. The first was DAP Racing, a horse racing partnership between Perry Martin, at the time from Yuba City, California, and Steve Coburn of Topaz Lake, Nevada, along with their spouses, Denise Martin and Carolyn Coburn. DAP stands for "Dumb Ass Partners"—a tongue-in-cheek response to a passerby who questioned their wisdom in purchasing the partnership's first racehorse, the mare Love the Chase, who became the dam of 2014 Kentucky Derby and Preakness Stakes winner California Chrome, her first foal. Coburn owned a 30% interest in the horse and in July 2015 sold his share to Taylor Made Farm. Following the sale, Martins and Taylor Made each sold "a few" shares in the stallion to "select breeders who would support the horse," forming the ownership syndicate California Chrome, LLC. The DAP partnership had jointly owned other horses, including California Chrome's full siblings and his dam, Love the Chase. These horses were distributed between the former partners. In 2019, the horse was sold to JS Company of Japan and stands at stud there.

== DAP Racing ==
Perry Martin was the majority owner of California Chrome and Steve Coburn held a 30% interest. The Martins and the Coburns had in common a fondness for California Chrome, but otherwise very different personalities and backgrounds. As Carolyn Coburn explained, "We couldn't be more different. We met at the racetrack because of a horse. That's what's so great about this game. It brings people together." The Martins seldom talked to the press, but Melissa Hoppert of The New York Times described them as the "quiet thinkers," noting that Perry Martin planned the mating of Lucky Pulpit with Love the Chase, mapped out a "Road to the Derby" racing plan for the horse, and promoted use of a nasal strip for California Chrome's races. Hoppert characterized the outgoing Coburns as the "public relations arm" of the partnership.

The Martins are originally from Chicago. They met over a mutual interest in the novel Foundation by Isaac Asimov, and went to the harness races on their first date; Perry Martin had been going to horse races at Arlington Park since he was a teenager. They owned and operate Martin Testing Laboratories (MTL), a division of Materials Technology Laboratories, Inc. until selling the company in 2020. It was located within McClellan Business Park at the former McClellan Air Force Base. MTL tested items such as automobile airbags and medical equipment. The company provided product assurance and reliability testing of new technologies and materials.

"[We test products that are] ... the kind where somebody dies if something goes wrong"."

— Perry Martin, on the high-reliability equipment tested by MTL

Perry Martin has an MBA, a degree in applied physics from Michigan Technological University, and an advanced degree in solid state physics from the University of Illinois-Chicago. Denise Martin had a degree from California State University, was MTL's CEO and senior chemist, managing the company's fatigue testing and thermal analytics. They married in 1986 and celebrated their 28th anniversary on the weekend of the Preakness, thus missing seeing the race live. They moved to California in 1987, where Perry Martin was employed as a metallurgist by the Air Force and Denise briefly job shadowed a racehorse trainer in the Sacramento area. Perry Martin worked at the McClellan Air Force Base prior to its 2001 closure, performing testing and analysis work, briefing both Congress and the Air Force Chief of Staff on his work with Air Force weapons systems. He wrote the Electronic Failure Analysis Handbook, published by McGraw-Hill in 1999. Denise Martin managed communications and business matters for California Chrome and other horses in their stable while Perry Martin was the public face of the pair.

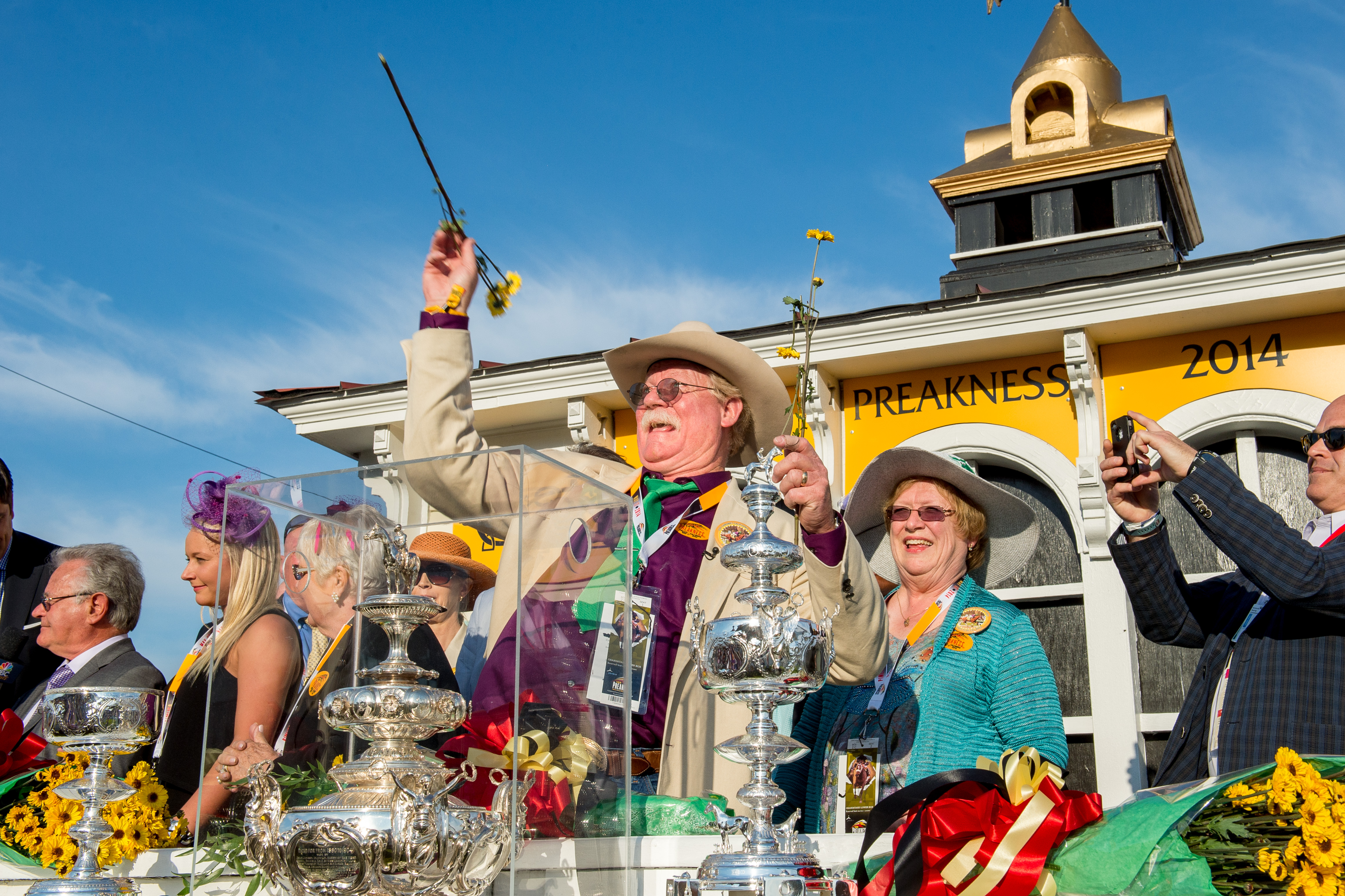
Steve and Carolyn Coburn (center) at the trophy presentation for the 2014 Preakness Stakes

Steve Coburn, characterized by the media as the more "loquacious" of the two men, describes himself and his wife as "just everyday people". He grew up in central California and was familiar with horses. He worked herding cattle at a feedlot, participated in rodeos, and worked at some ranching jobs. He now works as a press operator for a company that makes magnetic strips. Carolyn Coburn retired in March 2014 from a career working in payroll in the health care industry. Carolyn introduced Steve to horse racing, and when he was looking for a tax write-off, she encouraged him to buy into a racing syndicate instead of purchasing a small airplane.

=== Love the Chase ===
Love the Chase was purchased for $30,000 as a two-year-old by an agent for a horse ownership group called the Blinkers On Racing Stable. Perry Martin had been a member of the racing syndicate since 2007. Steve Coburn joined the group when he bought a share of the filly in 2008. Originally, the two couples each owned a five percent share in Love the Chase through their membership in Blinkers On Racing Stable.

As a two- and three-year-old filly, Love the Chase had been very nervous and often panicked in the saddling paddock, in effect losing races before she ever got to the starting gate. She ran six times and won on her fourth try in a maiden claiming race at Golden Gate Fields. When Blinkers On Racing Stable decided to dissolve the Love the Chase syndicate, both the Coburns and the Martins wanted to buy the filly. Instead, they decided to go into partnership; Perry Martin with a 70% share and as managing owner. After Love the Chase won her only race in February 2009, Coburn and Martin became her official owners. A casual observer, knowing Love the Chase's modest race record, remarked that only a "dumb ass" would buy her, so Coburn and Martin, on a handshake, named their racing operation DAP Racing— "Dumb Ass Partners". They created a caricature of a buck-toothed donkey to adorn the back of their racing silks, chose purple and green, the favorite colors of Carolyn Coburn and Denise Martin, for their stable colors, and put the initials "DAP" on California Chrome's blinker hood and the left front of the jockey's silks.

"We just hope that this horse is letting America know that the little guy can win."

— Steve Coburn, co-owner, May 17, 2014, following the Preakness Stakes

Martin and Coburn paid $8,000, then raced Love the Chase two more times and retired her in 2009. Wives Denise Martin and Carolyn Coburn became closely involved with the partnership, though they did not appear as owners on official records kept by Equibase. Martin and Coburn hoped Love the Chase would become a good broodmare, as she had a promising pedigree. When she retired, they discovered that she had raced with a breathing problem—an entrapped epiglottis that restricted her air intake, but was corrected with surgery. Martin researched pedigrees to determine the best stallion to match with Love the Chase. The mare failed to conceive in 2009 when bred to a stallion named Redattore, and did not go back to him for rebreeding because he had been sent to Brazil. For that reason, she was bred to Lucky Pulpit in 2010. CNN reported that the stud fee for the breeding was $2000. Prior to the beginning of the 2014 breeding season, Lucky Pulpit had a published stud fee of $2,500. (Note: After the success of California Chrome in 2014, Lucky Pulpit's stud fee was raised to $10,000.)

After California Chrome became a Kentucky Derby contender, Martin and Coburn turned down an offer of $2.1 million for Love the Chase. Between 2013 and 2016, Love the Chase gave birth to four foals, all full siblings to California Chrome. In 2016, Love the Chase was sent to Kentucky to be bred to Tapit, a son of Pulpit who was standing at stud for $300,000, the highest stud fee in North America. In August 2016, Martin announced that Love the Chase, confirmed in foal to Tapit, would be sold at the November Fasig-Tipton sale, as he wished to buy mares who could be bred to California Chrome. She sold to an unidentified buyer for $1.95 million.

=== California Chrome ===
California Chrome, sired by Lucky Pulpit and out of Love the Chase, was foaled on February 18, 2011, at Harris Farms near Coalinga, California, the horse breeding division of the Harris Ranch. Steve Coburn said he had a dream not long before California Chrome's birth that the foal would be a colt with four white feet and a blaze. California Chrome was relatively large for a newborn foal, weighing 137 pounds (62 kg), and active, described by Martin as "running circles around Momma" within two hours of birth. As a foal, he was given the nickname "Junior" by the Martins, because of his resemblance to his sire, Lucky Pulpit.

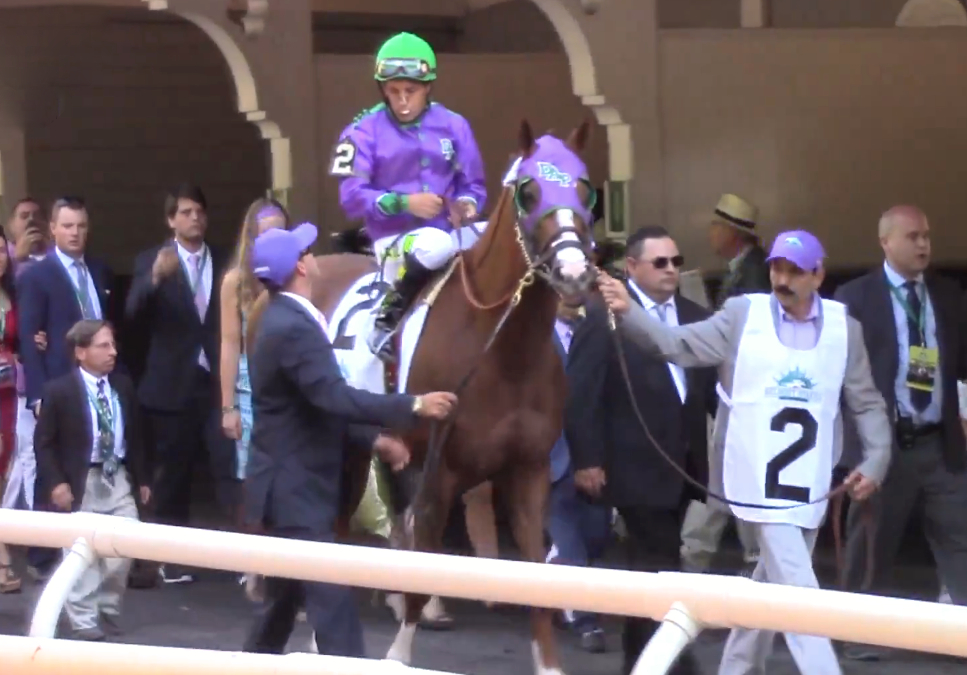
California Chrome at the 2014 Belmont Stakes

The Martins and Coburns chose California Chrome's official name in 2013 at Brewsters Bar & Grill in Galt, California, a town halfway between their two homes. Each of the four wrote a potential name on pieces of paper and asked a waitress to draw them out of Coburn's cowboy hat. They submitted the names to The Jockey Club ranked in the order drawn. California Chrome, Coburn's choice, was first drawn, and the registry accepted the name. The word "chrome" in his name comes from slang for a horse with flashy white markings.

California Chrome begin race training as a two-year-old colt with Art Sherman and Alan Sherman of Sherman Training Stables. After his first six races, he was paired with jockey Victor Espinoza and the team went on to a six-race winning streak that included the 2014 Kentucky Derby and Preakness Stakes. Prior to the Santa Anita Derby on April 8, 2014, DAP Racing turned down a $6 million offer for a 51% controlling interest in California Chrome that would have mandated putting the horse with a different trainer. Coburn later explained why: "This isn't about the money, this is about the dream."

Immediately following the Belmont Stakes, Coburn generated controversy when he described the current Triple Crown system as allowing "the coward's way out" because horses who had not run in the Kentucky Derby or Preakness Stakes could challenge horses who had contested all three legs without a break. Trainer Art Sherman commented, "[Coburn] was at the heat of the moment...Sometimes the emotions get in front of you." By the following Monday morning, Coburn had apologized, saying he wanted to congratulate the owners of winner Tonalist and adding, "I wanted so much for [California Chrome] to win the Triple Crown for the people of America, and I was pretty emotional, very emotional."

The 2015 season was a disappointment. California Chrome placed second in his first two races and then was sidelined by injuries. The relationship between Martin and Coburn also appeared to break down following Martin's decision to send the horse to England for training and a possible start at Royal Ascot. Both Coburn and Sherman had publicly opposed the move. Sherman expressed passing disappointment, but Coburn stopped talking to the press altogether, and Martin commented, "Steve is my compass, whatever he suggests, that means I go 180 degrees the other way." When the horse returned to America in July 2015, Coburn sold his minority interest in the horse to Taylor Made Farms, a stud farm in Kentucky. The horse returned to train with Sherman following a rest period at Taylor Made Farms.

=== Related horses ===
When the DAP partnership dissolved in 2016, Cobern formed Silver State Racing, a partnership that owned one of the full sisters to 'Chrome, R Sunday Surprise. The Martins formed Martin Racing and kept Chrome's full siblings Hope's Love and Faversham.

California Chrome's full sister, Hope's Love, foaled in 2013, had placed second in her racing debut at Golden Gate Fields in June, 2015, trained by Art Sherman's son, Steve. In July 2015, she was sidelined for the year due to a hairline fracture in her shoulderblade. She returned to racing in 2016 at Golden Gate Fields and ran in four more races, placed 5th twice, 6th once, and finishing last in her final race. Her ownership transferred from DAP racing to Martin as sole owner by her final two races. A second full sister foaled in 2014, R Sunday Surprise, began racing under Silver State Racing in 2016, trained by Doug O'Neill. She hit the board twice with third-place finishes in five starts. A full brother foaled in 2015, Faversham, entered race training in 2017.

== Taylor Made Farm and California Chrome, LLC ==
Principal members of California Chrome, LLC

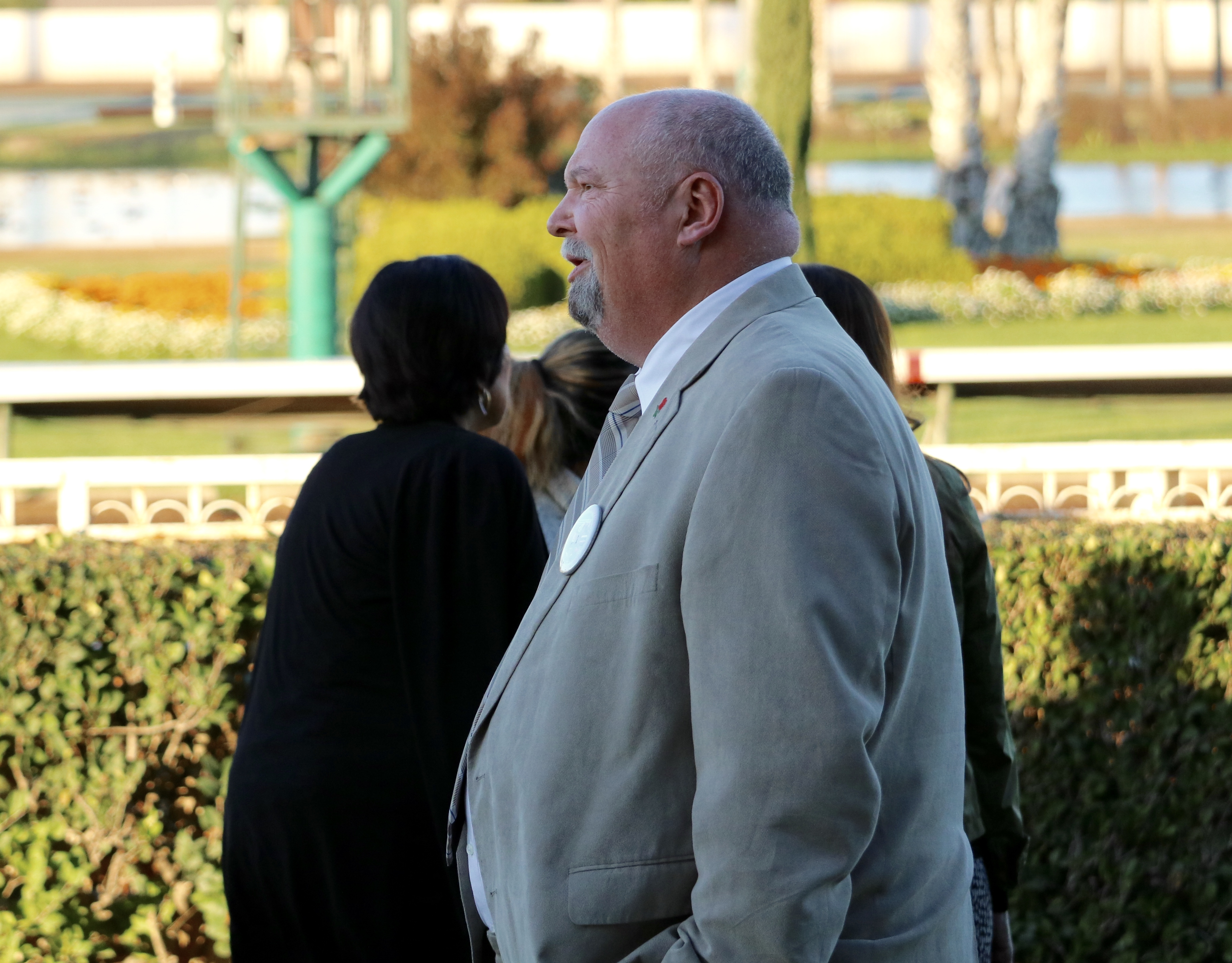
Perry Martin, 2016

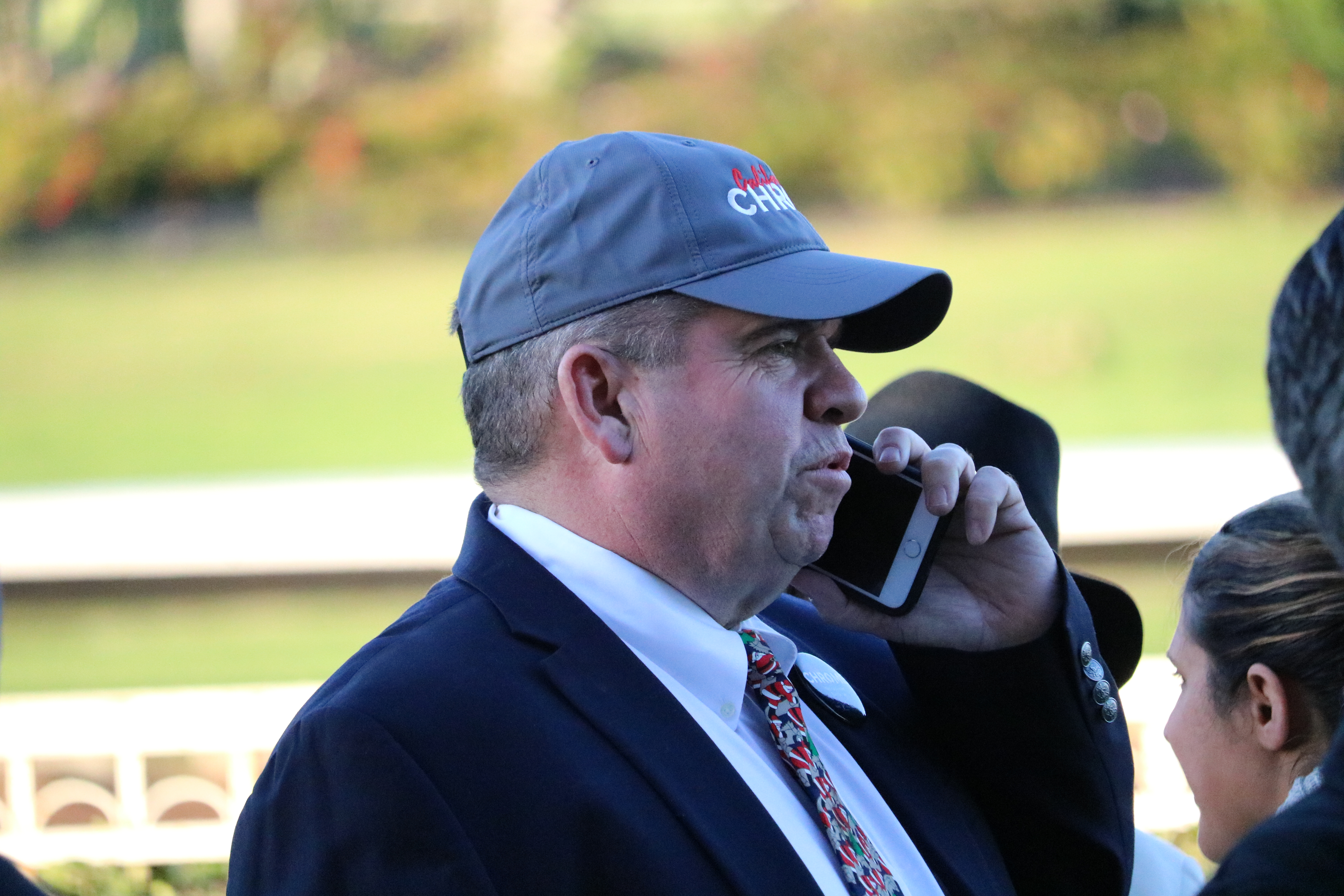
Taylor Made Farms manager Frank Taylor, 2016

Taylor Made Farms, headed by Duncan Taylor, the president and CEO of the family-owned farm. His brother, Ben Taylor, is the vice president of the company's Taylor Made Stallions division. The brothers of the Taylor family have been the sole owners of the corporation since 1986. They were raised in the horse business, learning from their father and grandfather. They formed Taylor Made Sales Agency in 1976, when Duncan was 19, offering boarding for mares shipped into Kentucky. They expanded to sales consignments and then built their own facility on 120 acres owned by their father in Nicholasville, Kentucky. The farm is now 1,600 acres. By early 2016, the horse's ownership was officially listed as "California Chrome, LLC". Perry and Denise Martin remained the "majority owners" by the Daily Racing Form, and Frank Taylor of Taylor Made said that both the Martins and Taylor Made had each sold "a few" shares in the stallion to "select breeders who would support the horse." Martin stated to the press in August 2016 that he ultimately would keep a 10% interest in the stallion and invest in mares suitable for crossing with California Chrome.

== JS Company ==
In 2019, California Chrome, LLC reached an agreement to sell the horse to Japan's JS Company, with protections in place for the horse to return to America at the conclusion of his breeding career. The company placed California Chrome at stud in Japan at the Arrow Stud in Hokkaido. The Martins retained a syndicate share in the horse.

== Sources ==
- HRTV Presents California Chrome (online video). HRTV.com. June 1, 2014. Archived from the original on June 6, 2014.
