= Honor A. P. =

American thoroughbred racehorse

- Sire: Honor Code
- Grandsire: A.P. Indy
- Dam: Hollywood Story
- Damsire: Wild Rush
- Sex: Ridgling
- Foaled: March 13, 2017 (age 9)
- Country: USA
- Colour: Dark Bay
- Breeder: George Krikorian
- Owner: C R K Stable LLC
- Trainer: John Shirreffs
- Record: 6: 2–3–0
- Earnings: $532,200

Major wins
- Santa Anita Derby (2020)

Honor A. P. (foaled March 13, 2017) is a retired American Thoroughbred racehorse best known for winning the 2020 Santa Anita Derby. He was also second in the San Felipe and Shared Belief Stakes and finished fourth in the 2020 Kentucky Derby.

== Background ==
Honor A. P. is a dark bay colt with a broad white blaze, bred in Kentucky by George Krikorian. As a yearling in 2018 he was consigned to the Fasig-Tipton Saratoga Sale and was bought for $850,000 by CRK Stable. He was trained by John Shirreffs.

Honor A. P. is from the first crop of foals by Honor Code, a Kentucky-bred stallion whose wins included the Metropolitan Handicap, the Whitney Stakes and the Gulfstream Park Handicap. Honor Code was a late-developing horse known for his come-from-behind finishing kick. Honor A. P. was named in honor of his grandsire, the great A.P. Indy. Honor A. P.'s dam Hollywood Story was a successful racemare who won the Vanity Stakes, Hawthorne Handicap and Bayakoa Stakes. The female line traces back to the broodmare Myrtlewood, whose family includes leading sires Mr. Prospector and Seattle Slew.

== Career ==
=== 2019: two-year-old season ===
Honor A. P.'s first race was on August 17, 2019, at Del Mar Racetrack, where he finished second. In his second race on October 13, he scored a win at Santa Anita in a maiden special weight over one mile on the dirt track.

=== 2020: three-year-old season ===
Honor A. P. started his 2020 season on March 7 at Santa Anita in the San Felipe Stakes, one of the traditional prep races on the Road to the Kentucky Derby. He rated in fourth place behind the early leaders and then closed ground to finish second behind Authentic. He earned a solid Beyer Speed Figure of 95 for the race, establishing himself as a serious contender for the Derby. However, Santa Anita was shut down shortly after the race due to the COVID-19 pandemic, while the Kentucky Derby wound up being rescheduled to September.

On June 6, Honor A. P. returned in the Santa Anita Derby, where he was the second betting choice at odds of 2-1 behind Authentic. He again rated behind the early pace in a tightly bunched pack, then started his move on the final turn while swinging four wide. He hit the lead in mid-stretch and continued to draw away to win by 1 1/2 lengths. Shirreffs was happy with the effort. "We knew that he has tactical speed", he said, "and [jockey Mike Smith] can put him pretty much where he wants. On the backside, we hoped he would get comfortable to have a nice little kick in the end, and it all worked out well."

Honor A. P. made his next start in the Shared Belief Stakes on August 1. In a field that scratched down to just four horses, he went off as the prohibitive 1-5 favorite. He and the horses on either side of him bumped each other at the start, then chased after early leader Thousand Words in a tight pack. Honor A. P. dropped back a bit on the backstretch then started to improve position on the far turn. However, he could not get by Thousand Words, who won by three-quarters of a length.

The 2020 Kentucky Derby had been rescheduled from May 2 to September 5. Of the seventeen horses that went to post, Honor A. P. was the second betting choice at odds of 5–1. Tiz the Law was the heavy favorite based on wins in the Belmont Stakes, Travers Stakes and Florida Derby. Authentic went to the early lead and was able to slow down the pace after a fast opening quarter-mile. Honor A. P. broke slowly and was near the back of the field, some 13 lengths behind Authentic after half a mile. He gradually started to improve position on the turn but was still in ninth place with seven lengths to make up with a quarter-mile remaining. He kept grinding away and closed to finish fourth behind Authentic. Smith said that the colt had not adjusted to the racing surface at Churchill Downs. "He spun out from the word go," said Smith. "Really did."

It was later discovered that Honor A. P. had pulled a tendon during the race, resulting in his retirement.

Statistics
Date	Race	Racecourse	Grade	Distance	Finish	Margin	Time	Weight	Odds	Jockey	Ref
Aug 17, 2019	Maiden	Del Mar Racetrack		6 Furlongs	2	(2 1/2 Lengths)	1:10.81	120 lbs	8.90	Mike E. Smith	
Oct 13, 2019	Maiden	Santa Anita Park		1 mile	1	5 1/4 Lengths	1:37.94	122 lbs	0.50*	Mike E. Smith	
Mar 7, 2020	San Felipe Stakes	Santa Anita Park	||	1 1/16 mile	2	(2 1/4 Lengths)	1:43.56	120 lbs	3.20	Mike E. Smith	
Jun 6, 2020	Santa Anita Derby	Santa Anita Park	|	1 1/8 mile	1	2 3/4 Lengths	1:48.97	124 lbs	2.20	Mike E. Smith	
Aug 1, 2020	Shared Belief Stakes	Del Mar Racetrack	||	1 1/16 mile	2	(3/4 Length)	1:43.85	124 lbs	0.20*	Mike E. Smith	
Sep 5, 2020	Kentucky Derby	Churchill Downs	|	1 1/4-mile	4	(5 Lengths)	2:00.61	126 lbs	7.60	Mike E. Smith	

== Retirement ==
Honor A. P. was retired to stud at Lane's End Farm, where he was moved to the stall formerly occupied by his grandsire, A.P. Indy, who had died earlier in 2020. His first foals came of racing age in 2024. His highest earning foal is Counting Stars, the 2026 Acorn Stakes and 2026 Coaching Club American Oaks winner, with $1,660,606 in earnings.

=== Notable progeny ===
c = colt, f = filly, g = gelding

Foaled	Name	Sex	Major Wins
2023	Counting Stars	f	Acorn Stakes (2026), Coaching Club American Oaks (2026)

== Pedigree ==
Pedigree of Honor A. P. (USA), 2017
Sire Honor Code (USA) 2011	A.P. Indy (USA); 2001	Seattle Slew	Bold Reasoning
Sire Honor Code (USA) 2011	A.P. Indy (USA); 2001	Seattle Slew	My Charmer
Sire Honor Code (USA) 2011	A.P. Indy (USA); 2001	Weekend Surprise	Secretariat
Sire Honor Code (USA) 2011	A.P. Indy (USA); 2001	Weekend Surprise	Lassie Dear
Sire Honor Code (USA) 2011	Serena's Cat (USA); 2003	Storm Cat	Storm Bird
Sire Honor Code (USA) 2011	Serena's Cat (USA); 2003	Storm Cat	Terlingua
Sire Honor Code (USA) 2011	Serena's Cat (USA); 2003	Serena's Tune	Mr. Prospector
Sire Honor Code (USA) 2011	Serena's Cat (USA); 2003	Serena's Tune	Serena's Song
Dam Hollywood Story (USA) 2001	Wild Rush (USA); 1994	Wild Again	Icecapade
Dam Hollywood Story (USA) 2001	Wild Rush (USA); 1994	Wild Again	Bushel n' Peck
Dam Hollywood Story (USA) 2001	Wild Rush (USA); 1994	Rose Park	Plugged Nickle
Dam Hollywood Story (USA) 2001	Wild Rush (USA); 1994	Rose Park	Hardship
Dam Hollywood Story (USA) 2001	Wife for Life (USA); 1994	Dynaformer	Roberto
Dam Hollywood Story (USA) 2001	Wife for Life (USA); 1994	Dynaformer	Andover Way
Dam Hollywood Story (USA) 2001	Wife for Life (USA); 1994	Huggle Duggle	Never Bend
Dam Hollywood Story (USA) 2001	Wife for Life (USA); 1994	Huggle Duggle	Crown the Queen (family 13-c)
