= Ridgling =

Male animal with one or both testicles undescended

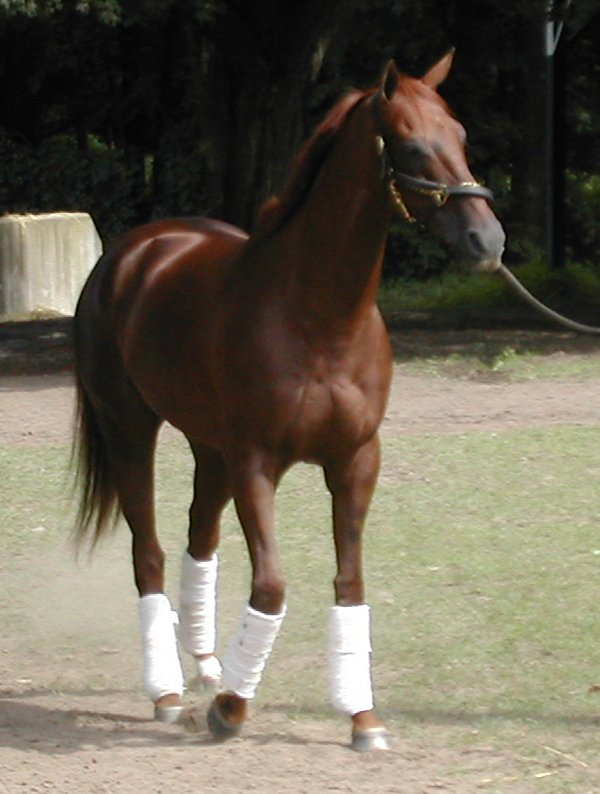
Funny Cide was a ridgling who was gelded and went on to become a champion race horse

A ridgling (also spelled ridgeling), or rig, is a cryptorchid; a male animal with one or both testicles undescended, usually describing a ram, bull, or male horse, but cryptorchidism also can be an issue in dogs and cats. Because the heat inside the body is too high for sperm to survive, an undescended testicle is non-functional. The condition is most often discussed in the horse world, as the health and behavioral issues surrounding adult males with the condition are of concern to owners and handlers of such animals.

== Dogs ==
In dogs, the toy and miniature breeds are considered more susceptible. The testicles usually descend by the time a puppy is 40 days old.

== In horses ==
Although the rate that testicles descend varies between individual animals, horses over three years with the condition are generally castrated. Surgery called a cryptorchidectomy is used to remove the retained testicle, but different procedures are used, depending on the location inside the body cavity.

An undescended testicle is not a serious or life-threatening condition, though it may cause the animal discomfort at times. This condition can be corrected by surgery to place the testicle in the correct position, but most ridglings are gelded to remove the testicle altogether.

When a male horse thought to be a gelding exhibits aggressive or sexual behavior, cryptorchidism is suspected. Sometimes, a horse with an unknown medical history is actually a stallion with both testicles retained. An alternative definition of ridgling is a partially castrated horse. This can occur when a ridgling is gelded, but the retained testicle is not removed, resulting in an incomplete castration. Such animals may exhibit sexual behavior similar to intact males, either because the undescended testicle eventually dropped into the scrotum after the castration procedure or because the retained testicle may still produce some hormones. Retained testicles in such cases generally are removed. There are blood tests that can determine if a horse is producing male hormones, though these do not detect a ridgling if hormone levels are too low. Palpation sometimes can detect a retained testicle, but is also of uneven reliability. There are also cases where true geldings exhibit aggressive or stallion-like behavior, sometimes called "false rigs", but their behavior is not hormone-driven and can sometimes be corrected with proper training and discipline.

The condition is considered heritable, but a genetic link has yet to be proven. Horses of any breed may be ridgelings, but Quarter Horses, Saddlebreds, Percherons, and ponies seem to be more likely to exhibit the condition. In dogs, the toy and miniature breeds are considered more susceptible. As a young male animal reaches puberty, the testicles, which originally were inside the abdominal cavity, move down the inguinal canal to the scrotum. In a ridgling, either the testicles fail to descend, or they are trapped behind the external inguinal ring and cannot emerge. Usually both testicles in a horse have descended by the age of 16 months, but as many as 15% of all two- and three-year-old male horses may have a retained testicle.

An example of a ridgeling that was gelded was the Kentucky Derby winner Funny Cide. While the horse was gelded because the undescended testicle caused him noticeable discomfort and his manners also improved after castration, his success in horse racing has led to considerable discussion over whether it would have been better to opt for surgically correcting the condition instead. A number of notable racehorse stallions were ridglings, including Honor Code, A.P. Indy and Slew o' Gold.

Owners of a prized animal may opt for surgery to preserve the value of a horse as a breeding stallion. There is debate over whether to remove the undescended testicle in a stallion; some people believe it causes discomfort to the animal, others disagree. Proponents of surgery note that it is low-risk, and the undescended testicle is non-functional, and it can be removed with laparoscopy or a very small incision. Some stallions show improved behavior and athletic performance when the non-functional testicle is removed. Such animals are sometimes called monorchids due to having only one testicle, but usually are fertile.
