= Always a Runner =

American racehorse

- Sire: Gun Runner
- Grandsire: Candy Ride (ARG)
- Dam: Always Carina
- Damsire: Malibu Moon
- Sex: Filly
- Foaled: January 26, 2023
- Country: United States
- Color: Dark Bay or Brown
- Breeder: Three Chimneys Farm
- Owner: Douglas Scharbauer & Three Chimneys Farm
- Trainer: Chad C. Brown
- Record: 6: 3 – 3 – 0
- Earnings: US$1,372,800

Major wins
- Gazelle Stakes (2026); Kentucky Oaks (2026)
- Last updated on September 20, 2026

Always a Runner (foaled January 26, 2023) is an American Thoroughbred racehorse who won the 2026 Kentucky Oaks.

== Background ==
Always a Runner is a dark bay or brown filly bred by Three Chimneys Farm. Her sire is Gun Runner who stands at Three Chimneys Farm for US$250,000 in 2026.

Four generations of dams have been owned by Three Chimneys Farm. Always a Runner's dam Always Carina was lightly raced having six starts and was placed in the 2021 Grade II Mother Goose Stakes. Her second dam, Miss Always Ready was bought by Three Chimneys Farm as a two-year-old for $400,000 and was also lightly raced with one win in five starts. Her third dam, Miss Seffens who was sired by Dehere and in a career of 26 starts won 11 events and was fourth in the 2000 GI Kentucky Oaks. Three Chimneys Farm tried to buy Miss Seffens in 2002 at the Keeneland November Mixed Sales but failed at the $345,000 asking price. However, they were successful in 2006 when the mare was bought for $310,000.

Always a Runner was bought for $1.05 million at the 2024 Keeneland September Yearling Sale by Douglas Scharbauer who in turn brought back the breeders Three Chimneys Farm in a partnership deal.

Always a Runner is trained by the Eclipse Award winning trainer Chad C. Brown.

As a two-year-old Always a Runner caught pneumonia and was sent to Bruce Jackson's Fair Hill Equine Therapy Center in Maryland and veterinarian Rodney Belgrave of Mid-Atlantic Equine Medical Center. The recovery impacted her training and development and thus was a reason why she started her racing career as a three-year-old.

== Statistics ==
Date	Distance	Race	Grade	Track	Odds	Field	Finish	Winning Time	Winning (Losing) Margin	Jockey	Ref
2026 – Three-year-old season
Feb 6, 2026	1 mile 40 yards	Maiden Special Weight		Tampa Bay Downs	0.60*	6	1	1:42.93	6 1/2 lengths	Samy Camacho	
Apr 4, 2026	1 1/8 miles	Gazelle Stakes	III	Aqueduct	4.69	8	1	1:50.97	1 1/4 lengths	Dylan Davis	
May 2, 2026	1 1/8 miles	Kentucky Oaks	I	Churchill Downs	5.52	13	1	1:48.82	1 1/4 lengths	Jose Ortiz	
Jun 5, 2026	1 1/8 miles	Acorn Stakes	I	Saratoga	0.86*	5	2	1:48.85	(3 3/4 lengths)	Irad Ortiz Jr.	
July 25, 2026	1 1/8 miles	Coaching Club American Oaks	I	Saratoga	1.88	7	2	1:48.98	(4 1/4 lengths)	Jose Ortiz	
Sep 19, 2026	1 1/16 miles	Cotillion Handicap	I	Parx	0.90*	9	2	1:43.60	(3 1/4 lengths)	Jose Ortiz	

Notes:
An (*) asterisk after the odds means Always a Runner was the post-time favorite.

== Pedigree ==
Pedigree of Always a Runner, bay filly, foaled January 26, 2023
Sire Gun Runner (2013)	Candy Ride (ARG) (1999)	Ride the Rails (1991)	Cryptoclearance (1984)
Sire Gun Runner (2013)	Candy Ride (ARG) (1999)	Ride the Rails (1991)	Herbalesian (1969)
Sire Gun Runner (2013)	Candy Ride (ARG) (1999)	Candy Girl (ARG) (1990)	Candy Stripes (1982)
Sire Gun Runner (2013)	Candy Ride (ARG) (1999)	Candy Girl (ARG) (1990)	City Girl (ARG) (1982)
Sire Gun Runner (2013)	Quiet Giant (2007)	Giant's Causeway (1997)	Storm Cat (1983)
Sire Gun Runner (2013)	Quiet Giant (2007)	Giant's Causeway (1997)	Mariah's Storm (1991)
Sire Gun Runner (2013)	Quiet Giant (2007)	Quiet Dance (1993)	Quiet American (1986)
Sire Gun Runner (2013)	Quiet Giant (2007)	Quiet Dance (1993)	Misty Dancer (1988)
Dam Always Carina (2018)	Malibu Moon (1997)	A. P. Indy (1989)	Seattle Slew (1974)
Dam Always Carina (2018)	Malibu Moon (1997)	A. P. Indy (1989)	Weekend Surprise (1980)
Dam Always Carina (2018)	Malibu Moon (1997)	Macoumba (1992)	Mr. Prospector (1970)
Dam Always Carina (2018)	Malibu Moon (1997)	Macoumba (1992)	Maximova (FR) (1980)
Dam Always Carina (2018)	Miss Always Ready (2012)	More Than Ready (1997)	Southern Halo (1983)
Dam Always Carina (2018)	Miss Always Ready (2012)	More Than Ready (1997)	Woodmans Girl (1990)
Dam Always Carina (2018)	Miss Always Ready (2012)	Miss Seffens (1997)	Dehere (1991)
Dam Always Carina (2018)	Miss Always Ready (2012)	Miss Seffens (1997)	Noise Enough (1990) (family A1)
