= Danza (horse) =

American thoroughbred racehorse

- Sire: Street Boss
- Grandsire: Street Cry
- Dam: Champagne Royale
- Damsire: French Deputy
- Sex: Stallion
- Foaled: April 17, 2011
- Country: USA
- Breeder: Liberation Farm & Brandywine Farm
- Owner: Eclipse Thoroughbred Partners
- Trainer: Todd A. Pletcher
- Record: 5: 2–0–3
- Earnings: $866,428

Major wins
- Arkansas Derby (2014)

Danza (April 17, 2011 – June 23, 2021) was an American Thoroughbred racehorse who won the 2014 Arkansas Derby.

== Career ==
On July 12, 2013, Danza competed in and won his first race at Belmont Park.

Danza would not see victory again until April 12, 2014, at the Grade 1 2014 Arkansas Derby.

Danza's last race took place on May 3, 2014, when he came in 3rd at the 2014 Kentucky Derby.

Danza died of an apparent heart attack on June 23, 2021.

== Pedigree ==
Pedigree of Danza (USA), chestnut horse, 2011
| Sire Street Boss (USA) b. 2004 | Street Cry (IRE) b. 1998 | Machiavellian | Mr. Prospector |
| Sire Street Boss (USA) b. 2004 | Street Cry (IRE) b. 1998 | Machiavellian | Coup de Folie |
| Sire Street Boss (USA) b. 2004 | Street Cry (IRE) b. 1998 | Helen Street | Troy |
| Sire Street Boss (USA) b. 2004 | Street Cry (IRE) b. 1998 | Helen Street | Waterway |
| Sire Street Boss (USA) b. 2004 | Blushing Ogygiam (USA) b. 1994 | Ogygian | Damascus |
| Sire Street Boss (USA) b. 2004 | Blushing Ogygiam (USA) b. 1994 | Ogygian | Gonfalon |
| Sire Street Boss (USA) b. 2004 | Blushing Ogygiam (USA) b. 1994 | Fruhlingshochzeit | Blushing Groom |
| Sire Street Boss (USA) b. 2004 | Blushing Ogygiam (USA) b. 1994 | Fruhlingshochzeit | Fruhlingstar |
| Dam Champagne Royale (USA) b. 2001 | French Deputy (USA) b. 1992 | Deputy Minister | Vice Regent |
| Dam Champagne Royale (USA) b. 2001 | French Deputy (USA) b. 1992 | Deputy Minister | Mint Copy |
| Dam Champagne Royale (USA) b. 2001 | French Deputy (USA) b. 1992 | Mitterand | Hold Your Peace |
| Dam Champagne Royale (USA) b. 2001 | French Deputy (USA) b. 1992 | Mitterand | Laredo Lass |
| Dam Champagne Royale (USA) b. 2001 | All Tanked Up (USA) b. 1989 | Tank's Prospect | Mr Prospector |
| Dam Champagne Royale (USA) b. 2001 | All Tanked Up (USA) b. 1989 | Tank's Prospect | Midnight Pumpkin |
| Dam Champagne Royale (USA) b. 2001 | All Tanked Up (USA) b. 1989 | All Week End | Al Hattab |
| Dam Champagne Royale (USA) b. 2001 | All Tanked Up (USA) b. 1989 | All Week End | Weekend Fun |
