= Wicked Strong =

American-bred Thoroughbred racehorse

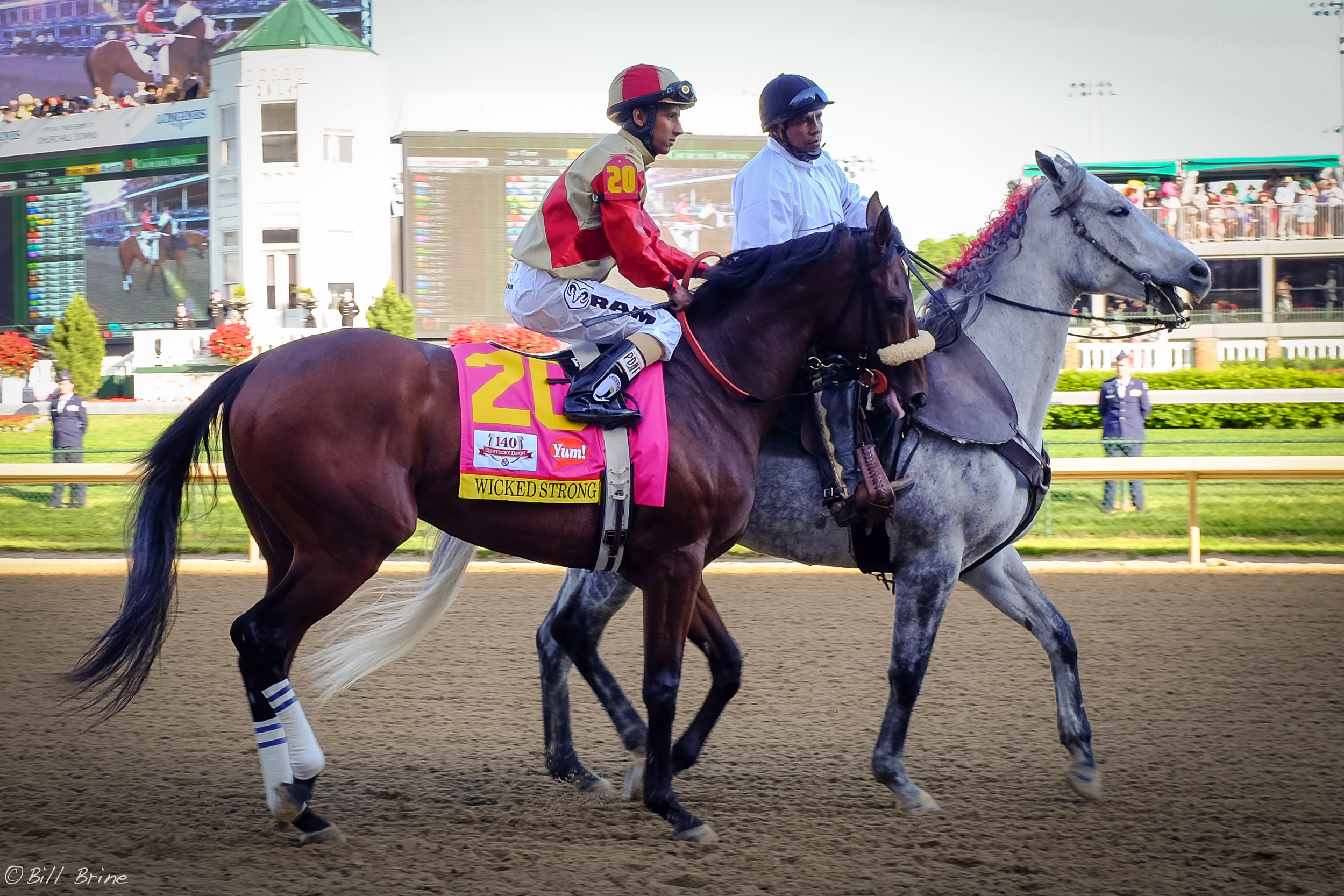
- Wicked Strong at 2014 Kentucky Derby.
- Sire: Hard Spun
- Grandsire: Danzig
- Dam: Moyne Abbey
- Damsire: Charismatic
- Sex: Colt
- Foaled: April 28, 2011
- Country: United States
- Color: Bay
- Breeder: William F. Lynn
- Owner: Centennial Farms and Alex Haas
- Trainer: James Jerkens
- Record: 14:3-2-2
- Earnings: $1,559,460

Major wins
- Wood Memorial Stakes (2014); Jim Dandy Stakes (2014)

Wicked Strong (foaled April 28, 2011 in Kentucky) is an American Thoroughbred racehorse. He established himself as a contender for the 2014 Kentucky Derby with a win in the Wood Memorial Stakes. He finished fourth in both the Kentucky Derby and the Belmont Stakes before winning the Jim Dandy Stakes.

== Background ==
Wicked Strong is a bay colt with a white star bred in Kentucky by William F. Lynn. He is one of the best horses sired by Hard Spun, who finished second in the 2007 Kentucky Derby before winning the King's Bishop Stakes. Hard Spun's other progeny includes CCA Oaks and Alabama Stakes winner Questing. His dam, Moyne Abbey was a half sister to the Grade III winner Gulch Approval and a descendant of the influential broodmare Lisette, making her a distant relative of Snow Chief, Al Bahathri and Haafhd.

Originally named Moyne Spun, the colt was sent to the yearling sale at Keeneland in September 2012. He was bought for $375,000 by Centennial Farms, a group from Boston who renamed their purchase "Wicked Strong". "Boston Strong" became a rallying cry for the city after the 2013 Marathon bombings, while "Wicked" is Bostonian for "very".

== Racing career ==
=== 2013: two-year-old season ===
Wicked Strong made his racecourse debut in a six-furlong maiden special weight at Belmont Park on September 21. Ridden by Edgar Prado, he started slowly but made steady progress and finished second, five and a half lengths behind winner Manhattan Johnnie. In the following month, he was moved up in distance for a one-mile maiden at the same track. Prado moved the colt up to dispute the lead on the outside with five sixteenths of a mile left to run. Wicked Strong gained the advantage after a brief struggle with Endowment Manager and recorded his first success, winning by two lengths from Cool Samurai. Wicked Strong was moved up in class for his final start of the year, the Grade II Remsen Stakes at Aqueduct on November 30 in which Rajiv Maragh took over from Prado. He started awkwardly but finished well to take third, beaten a nose and half a length by Honor Code and Cairo Prince despite tossing his head and shying away from his rider's stick in the straight.

=== 2014: three-year-old season ===
Wicked Strong began his second season with two runs at Gulfstream Park. In January, he started the 4.3/1 third favorite for the Grade II Holy Bull Stakes but was never in contention and was eased down in the closing stages by his rider Javier Castellano to finish ninth of the eleven runners behind Cairo Prince. Jose Lezcano became the fourth jockey to ride the colt when he was dropped in class to contest an allowance race on February 22. He appeared outpaced in the early stages but passed tiring rivals in the straight and finished fourth of the ten runners behind Constitution. In April, Wicked Strong was moved north for the Grade I Wood Memorial Stakes at Aqueduct, a major trial race for the Kentucky Derby. The betting market was dominated by the unbeaten colts Social Inclusion and Samraat, and Wicked Strong, ridden by Maragh, started at 9.2/1. The colt settled on the inside before switching out and turning into the straight in fourth place. He overtook Social Inclusion inside the final furlong and drew away to win "readily" by three and a half lengths.

In the 2014 Kentucky Derby, Wicked Strong, the 6.5/1 second favorite, drew number 20 post position, on the far outside of the field. Jerkens admitted that the draw was disadvantageous and commented that "my dad was bummed about it" but also said that "at least he won't have anybody from the outside banging him in there". After stumbling on leaving the gate Wicked Strong was forced five wide on the first turn and was towards the back of the field for most of the way. He was in tenth place with a quarter mile left to run but made steady progress to finish fourth behind California Chrome, Commanding Curve and Danza.

Wicked Strong's connections opted to bypass the Preakness Stakes and reappeared in the Belmont Stakes on June 7 when he was one of ten colts attempting to prevent California Chrome from winning the Triple Crown. Starting the 5.3/1 second favorite he raced in mid-division before turning into the straight in sixth. He made steady progress on the wide outside in the closing stages but never looked likely to win, eventually dead-heating with California Chrome for fourth, two lengths behind the winner Tonalist.

On July 26, Wicked Strong started second favorite behind Tonalist in the Jim Dandy Stakes over nine furlongs at Saratoga Race Course. Equipped with blinkers for the first time he raced much closer to the lead than usual, went to the front approaching the final turn and won by two and a quarter lengths from Tonalist. After the race, Jerkens said "I don't think Secretariat worked any better than this horse does in the morning. I know the talent's there. It's just getting him to put it all together." In the Travers Stakes on August 23, he started joint-second-favourite with Tonalist behind the Haskell Invitational Stakes winner Bayern. He stalked the pace set by Bayern and took the lead at the one mile pole, but though he again defeated Tonalist, he was nipped at the wire in a photo finish by stablemate V.E. Day. After becoming the first trainer since Nick Zito to send out a 1–2 in the race, Jerkens commented "I just feel bad for Wicked Strong; that's the only thing, he ran so hard."

On September 27 Wicked Strong faced Tonalist, V.E. Day and the leading older horse Moreno in the Jockey Club Gold Cup over ten furlongs at Belmont. He was travelling well just behind the leaders when he was cut off by Moreno approaching the final turn, clipped heels, and unseated his jockey Rajiv Maragh. Maragh suffered a broken arm in the fall, but the horse appeared to come out of the race without injury; Moreno finished fourth, but was disqualified due to interference and placed last.

=== 2015: four-year-old season ===
Wicked Strong made his 2015 debut in the Gulfstream Park Handicap in March and finished fourth behind Honor Code. He finished third behind Effinex in the Excelsior Stakes at Aqueduct in April, and then finished fifth of the ten runners, again behind Honor Code, in the Metropolitan Handicap in June. He finished second in the Forbidden Apple Stakes, fourth in the Whitney Handicap, third in the Woodward Stakes, and second in the Jockey Club Gold Cup.

He made the final start of his career in the 2015 Breeders' Cup Dirt Mile, running fourth to Liam's Map.

== Retirement and stud career ==
Before his start in the 2015 Breeders' Cup Dirt Mile, it was announced that Spendthrift Farm had acquired Wicked Strong's breeding rights, and that he would retire at the end of the year to assume stallion duties at the farm beginning in 2016.

Wicked Strong was bred to 190 mares in his first book, second only to American Pharoah among first year stallions. His first foal, a colt out of mare Circle My Name (by Ophidian), was born on New Year's Day.

Wicked Strong's 2017 stud fee was set at $10,000, but has dropped to $6,000 for 2020 and $3,500 for 2023 due to low quality foals in 2018 through 2023.

== Pedigree ==
Pedigree of Wicked Strong (USA), bay colt, 2011
Sire Hard Spun (USA) 2004	Danzig (USA); 1977	Northern Dancer	Nearctic
Sire Hard Spun (USA) 2004	Danzig (USA); 1977	Northern Dancer	Natalma
Sire Hard Spun (USA) 2004	Danzig (USA); 1977	Pas De Nom	Admiral's Voyage
Sire Hard Spun (USA) 2004	Danzig (USA); 1977	Pas De Nom	Petitioner
Sire Hard Spun (USA) 2004	Turkish Tryst (USA); 1991	Turkoman	Alydar
Sire Hard Spun (USA) 2004	Turkish Tryst (USA); 1991	Turkoman	Taba
Sire Hard Spun (USA) 2004	Turkish Tryst (USA); 1991	Darbyvail	Roberto
Sire Hard Spun (USA) 2004	Turkish Tryst (USA); 1991	Darbyvail	Luiana
Dam Moyne Abbey (USA) 2002	Charismatic (USA); 1996	Summer Squall	Storm Bird
Dam Moyne Abbey (USA) 2002	Charismatic (USA); 1996	Summer Squall	Weekend Surprise
Dam Moyne Abbey (USA) 2002	Charismatic (USA); 1996	Bali Babe	Drone
Dam Moyne Abbey (USA) 2002	Charismatic (USA); 1996	Bali Babe	Polynesian Charm
Dam Moyne Abbey (USA) 2002	Classic Approval (USA); 1994	With Approval	Caro
Dam Moyne Abbey (USA) 2002	Classic Approval (USA); 1994	With Approval	Passing Mood
Dam Moyne Abbey (USA) 2002	Classic Approval (USA); 1994	Classic Value	Copelan
Dam Moyne Abbey (USA) 2002	Classic Approval (USA); 1994	Classic Value	Queen Pat (family 9-e)
