= 2014 Kentucky Derby =

Horse race

140th Kentucky Derby
- Kentucky Derby
- Official logo for the 2014 Kentucky Derby
- Location: Churchill Downs
- Date: May 3, 2014
- Winning horse: California Chrome
- Winning time: 2:03.66
- Starting price: 5-2
- Jockey: Victor Espinoza
- Trainer: Art Sherman
- Owner: Steve Coburn & Perry Martin
- Conditions: Fast
- Surface: Dirt
- Attendance: 164,906

The 2014 Kentucky Derby was the 140th running of the Kentucky Derby. The race was scheduled to start at 6:24 pm Eastern Daylight Time (EDT) on May 3, 2014, at Churchill Downs and was run as the eleventh race on a racecard with thirteen races. The race was broadcast in the United States on the NBC television network. The attendance for the race was 164,906, the second-largest after the 2012 race with 165,307 spectators. The winner was California Chrome.

== Qualification ==
The Kentucky Derby is a race for 3-year-old Thoroughbred horses. The 2014 field was determined by a points system that was introduced in 2013.

== Field ==
The Post Position Draw for the Kentucky Derby was held Wednesday, April 30, 2014, at the Churchill Downs Racetrack clubhouse. After the draw, California Chrome was installed as the morning line favorite at 5–2 entering the derby having won four straight stakes.

Second favorite Hoppertunity was scratched on the Thursday prior to the Derby due to soreness. Post positions were moved up and Pablo del Monte was given slot 20. However, the connections of Pablo del Monte chose not to run and he was also scratched from the race.

Jockeys José Ortiz and Irad Ortiz Jr. became the first brothers to race in the Kentucky Derby since 1984. It was the first Derby for each of them. Rosie Napravnik was riding in her third Derby, hoping to become the first woman rider to win the race.

== Race description ==
Nineteen horses started, with 164,906 spectators gathered at Churchill Downs. It was the second-largest crowd in Kentucky Derby history. Uncle Sigh and Chitu set the early pace, as jockey Victor Espinoza held California Chrome back in third, a bit off the pace. Coming around the final turn, California Chrome and then fourth place Samraat made a move, surging past the pace setters. The two horses remained neck-and-neck for several strides before California Chrome broke away and coasted to finish line, winning by 1 3/4 lengths. Long-shot Commanding Curve came from well back to claim second, while Danza took third. Wicked Strong placed fourth and Samraat faded to fifth. For the win, California Chrome took home $1.418 million of the $2.178 million purse.

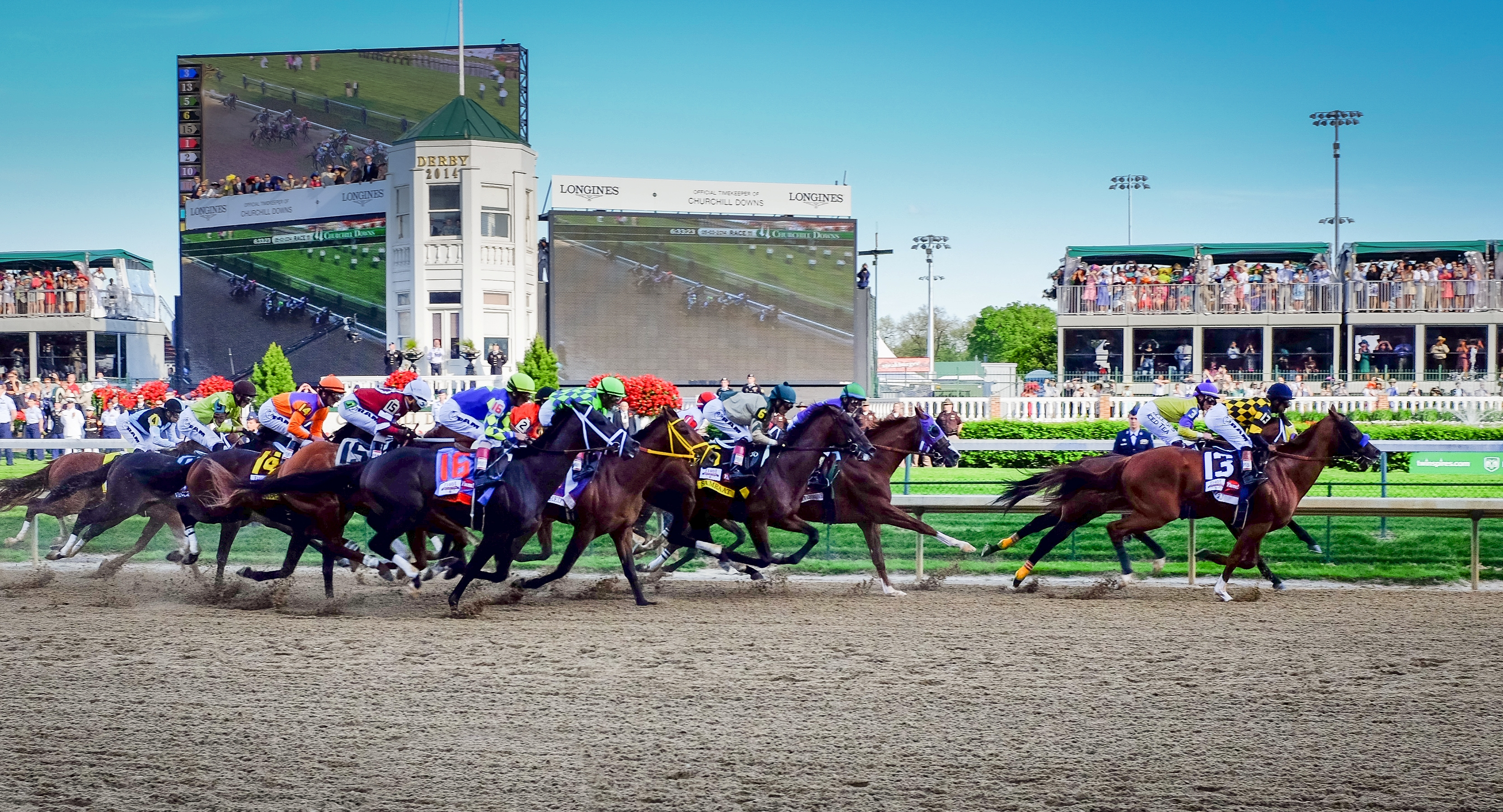
The 2014 Kentucky Derby field. Winner California Chrome is the third horse from the right.

California Chrome became the first California-bred horse to win the Derby since Decidedly in 1962. For Espinoza, it was his second Kentucky Derby win, his first coming in 2002 when he rode War Emblem to victory. After the race, trainer Art Sherman called Espinoza's ride "perfect". At age 77, Sherman is the oldest trainer to win the race. His only previous experience at Churchill Downs was in 1955, when he was an exercise rider for Swaps. Swaps won the Derby that year. Interviewed after the race, Sherman emotionally remarked, "Well, when I went to Swaps' grave the other day I said a little prayer and it came true. I said I hope [California Chrome] is another Swaps."

By pedigree, California Chrome was an unlikely winner. The combination of his humble roots and those of his connections prompted the Associated Press to remark, "Even Hollywood couldn't have made this up." He is the offspring of a mare, Love the Chase, purchased for $8,000, and a stallion, Lucky Pulpit, that stood for a $2,000 stud fee. The horse is owned by "a couple of working stiff owners", Perry Martin and Steve Coburn, who spent what they could afford in the hopes of producing a great race horse. California Chrome trains at Los Alamitos Race Course in Orange County. His Derby win was his fifth straight win, a streak which began in December 2013. His margin of victory in these races was a combined total of 26 lengths.

Coburn, who predicted that California Chrome would win the Derby, also predicted his horse would be the first California-bred winner of the Triple Crown. Rival trainers conceded it was plausible. Trainer Dale Romans, who had said California Chrome had no chance to win the Derby, remarked, "I was very, very wrong ... We might have just seen a super horse and a super trainer."

=== Results ===
Finish	Post	Horse	Jockey	Trainer	Morning line odds	Final odds	Margin (lengths)	Winnings	Points
1	5	California Chrome	Victor Espinoza	Art Sherman	5–2	2.5	1 3/4	$1,417,800	150
2	16	Commanding Curve	Shaun Bridgmohan	Dallas Stewart	50–1	37.8	1 3/4	$400,000	20
3	4	Danza	Joe Bravo	Todd Pletcher	10–1	8.7	3	$200,000	100
4	19	Wicked Strong	Rajiv Maragh	James Jerkens	8–1	6.5	5 3/4	$100,000	102
5	6	Samraat	José Ortiz	Rick Violette Jr.	15–1	16.7	5 3/4	$60,000	100
6	11	Dance With Fate	Corey Nakatani	Peter Eurton	20–1	16.0	6 1/4		108
7	18	Ride On Curlin	Calvin Borel	William Gowan	15–1	17.3	6 3/4		55
8	13	Medal Count	Robby Albarado	Dale Romans	20–1	26.2	7 1/2		40
9	12	Chitu	Martin Garcia	Bob Baffert	20–1	25.5	8		54
10	7	We Miss Artie	Javier Castellano	Todd Pletcher	50–1	27.6	8 1/4		60
11	8	General A Rod	Joel Rosario	Michael J. Maker	15–1	30.7	8 1/2		40
12	15	Intense Holiday	John Velazquez	Todd Pletcher	12–1	14.1	9 1/4		93
13	17	Candy Boy	Gary Stevens	John W. Sadler	20–1	9.4	12		30
14	3	Uncle Sigh	Irad Ortiz Jr.	Gary Contessa	30–1	30.8	16 1/4		24
15	14	Tapiture	Ricardo Santana Jr.	Steve Asmussen	15–1	35.2	17 1/2		52
16	2	Harry's Holiday	Corey Lanerie	Michael J. Maker	50–1	44.3	23 3/4		20
17	9	Vinceremos	Joe Rocco Jr.	Todd Pletcher	30–1	49.7	29 1/2		20
18	10	Wildcat Red	Luis Saez	Jose Garoffalo	15–1	18.6	29 1/2		90
19	1	Vicar's In Trouble	Rosie Napravnik	Michael J. Maker	30–1	20.40	39 1/2		120
scratched		Hoppertunity	~~Mike Smith~~	~~Bob Baffert~~	SCR	-	-		95
scratched	Also eligible	Pablo del Monte	~~Jeffrey Sanchez~~	~~Wesley Ward~~	SCR	-	-		20

Track – Fast

Times: 1/4 mile – 23.04; 1/2 mile – 47.37; 3/4 mile – 1:11.80; mile – 1:37.45; final – 2:03.66.
Splits for each quarter-mile: (23.04) (24.33) (24.34) (25.65) (26.21)

Source: Equibase chart

== Payout ==
The Kentucky Derby Payout Schedule

Program Number	Horse Name	Win	Place	Show
5	California Chrome	US$7.00	$5.60	$4.20
17	Commanding Curve	–	$31.80	$15.40
4	Danza	–	–	$6.00

- $2 Exacta: (5–17) $340.00
- $1 Trifecta: (5–17–4) $1,712.30
- $1 Superfecta: (5–17–4–20) $7,691.90

== Subsequent Grade I wins ==
California Chrome was the only starter in the Derby who went on to win at the Grade I level. He was named the Horse of the Year in 2014 and 2016.

- California Chrome – 2014 Preakness Stakes, Hollywood Derby, 2016 Dubai World Cup, Pacific Classic, Awesome Again Stakes
