= 2014 Preakness Stakes =

139th running of the Preakness Stakes

139th Preakness Stakes
- Preakness Stakes
- "The Middle Jewel of the Triple Crown" "The Run for the Black-Eyed Susans"
- Location: Pimlico Race Course, Baltimore, Maryland, U.S.
- Date: May 17, 2014
- Winning horse: California Chrome
- Winning time: 1:54.84
- Final odds: 1-2
- Jockey: Victor Espinoza
- Trainer: Art Sherman
- Conditions: Fast
- Surface: Dirt
- Attendance: ▲123,469 (record at the time)

The 2014 Preakness Stakes was the 139th running of the Preakness Stakes. The race was scheduled to start at 6:18 pm Eastern Daylight Time (EDT) on May 17, 2014, at Pimlico Race Course and was run as the twelfth race on a racecard with thirteen races. The race was won by California Chrome, giving him a chance to win the Triple Crown at Belmont. It is the thirty-fourth time a horse has won the first two legs of the Triple Crown. The Maryland Jockey Club reported a track record total attendance of 123,469, the second highest attendance for American thoroughbred racing events in North America during 2014.

The payout to the winning horses in the 2014 Stakes was US$1,500,000, an increase of half a million dollars from the previous year.

== Field ==
The 2014 Kentucky Derby winner California Chrome was the morning line favorite at 3–5 and drew the number three post position. Only two horses who ran in the Kentucky Derby entered the Preakness, General a Rod and Ride on Curlin, both with new jockeys.

The other entrants included Pablo Del Monte, whose owners opted not to run in the Kentucky Derby after he was made eligible by the scratch of Hoppertunity; Federico Tesio winner Kid Cruz; Illinois Derby winner Dynamic Impact; Bayern, trained by Bob Baffert; Social Inclusion, who ran third in the Wood Memorial and was second favorite on the morning line at 5–1; and the filly Ria Antonia, winner of the Breeders' Cup Juvenile Fillies (via disqualification of first-place finisher She's a Tiger) and sixth in the Kentucky Oaks.

The addition of Ria Antonia marked the first time that a female horse and a woman trainer had all competed in the Preakness in the same year; Rosie Napravnik rode Bayern, and Kid Cruz was trained by Linda Rice.

== Race description ==
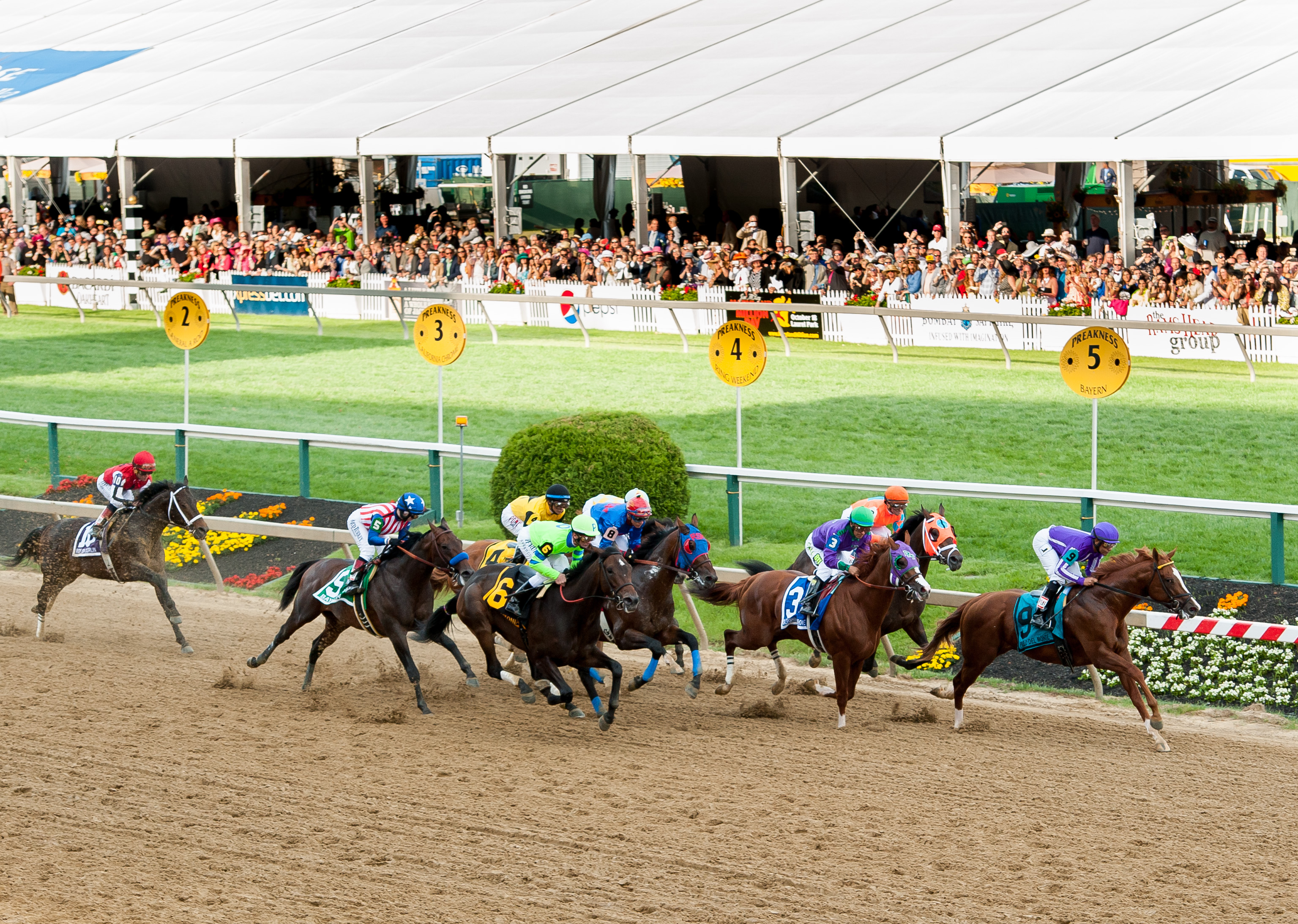
Field of the 2014 Preakness Stakes as they first pass the stands. Pablo Del Monte is in front, Winner California Chrome is horse number 3.

The attendance at Pimlico was record-breaking at 123,469, surpassing the 2012 record of 121,309. The infield festival featured live performances by Nas and Lorde. Total parimutuel handle for the entire race card was the sixth largest in Preakness day wagering history at $83.8 million, of which $53.7 million was bet just on the Preakness.

California Chrome proved victorious at the Preakness in 1:54.84, 1-1/2 lengths ahead of rival Ride on Curlin, who was followed by Social Inclusion. Pablo Del Monte and Ria Antonia took early leads out of the gate, but quickly fell behind and were surpassed. The winner starting at 3–5 odds, the same as the morning line but was 1–2 by post time. California Chrome made a clean start out of the gate, remained in the top three throughout the entire race, made his bid for the lead at the far turn and moved to the front at the top of the stretch, holding off a challenge from Social Inclusion, who tired and finished third, 6-1/2 lengths behind second-place finisher Ride on Curlin, who finished well, but was still 1-1/2 lengths behind the winner.

== Payout ==
The 139th Preakness payout schedule

Program number	Horse name	Win	Place	Show
3	California Chrome	$3.00	$3.00	$2.40
10	Ride On Curlin	–	$5.60	$3.80
8	Social Inclusion	–	–	$3.40

- $2 Exacta: (3-10) $18.20
- $2 Trifecta: (3-10-8) $76.00
- $1 Superfecta: (3-10-8-2) $173.80

== The full chart ==
Finish position	Margin (lengths)	Post position	Horse name	Jockey	Trainer	Owner	Morning Line odds	Post Time odds	Stakes
1	0	3	California Chrome	Victor Espinoza	Art Sherman	Steve Coburn & Perry Martin	3–5 favorite	1–2 favorite	$900,000
2	1 1/2	10	Ride on Curlin	Joel Rosario	William Gowan	Daniel Doherty	10–1	10.3	$300,000
3	8	8	Social Inclusion	Luis Contreras	Manny Azpurua	Rontos Racing Stable Corp	5–1	5.3	$165,000
4	8	2	General a Rod	Javier Castellano	Mike Maker	SkyChai Racing LLC and Starlight Racing	15–1	20.1	$90,000
5	12 1/4	4	Ring Weekend	Alan Garcia	H. Graham Motion	St. Elias Stable and West Point Thoroughbreds	20–1	30.1	$45,000
6	14	9	Pablo Del Monte	Jeffrey Sanchez	Wesley A. Ward	Susan Magnier, D. Smith, M. Tabor, W. A. Ward	20–1	34.3	
7	15 3/4	1	Dynamic Impact	Miguel Mena	Mark E. Casse	John C. Oxley	12–1	22.2	
8	16	7	Kid Cruz	Julien Pimentel	Linda L. Rice	Vina Del Mar Thoroughbreds LLC/Black Swan Stable	20–1	12.3	
9	21	5	Bayern	Rosie Napravnik	Bob Baffert	Kaleem Shah, Inc	10–1	12.9	
10	31	6	Ria Antonia†	Calvin Borel	Thomas M. Amoss	Christopher Dunn and Looch Racing	30–1	18.9	

Key: † filly (carries 121 lb.)

- Winning breeder: Steve Coburn & Perry Martin
- Final time: 1:54.84
- Margins: 1 1/2 lengths, 6 1/2 lengths
- Track: Fast
- Attendance: 123,469

== See also ==
- 2014 Kentucky Derby
- 2014 Belmont Stakes
