= Honor Code (horse) =

American-bred Thoroughbred racehorse

- Sire: A.P. Indy
- Grandsire: Seattle Slew
- Dam: Serena's Cat
- Damsire: Storm Cat
- Sex: Colt
- Foaled: 2011
- Country: United States
- Colour: Bay
- Breeder: Dell Ridge Farm LLC
- Owner: Lane's End Racing
- Trainer: Claude R. McGaughey III
- Record: 10: 6-2-1
- Earnings: $2,518,260

Major wins
- Remsen Stakes (2013); Gulfstream Park Handicap (2015); Metropolitan Handicap (2015); Whitney Handicap (2015)

Awards
- American Champion Older Dirt Male Horse (2015)

Honor Code (foaled March 1, 2011) is a Thoroughbred racehorse bred in Kentucky, USA. He was sired by A.P. Indy, son of Triple Crown winner Seattle Slew and out of mare Weekend Surprise, who was sired by another Triple Crown winner: Secretariat. His dam is Serena's Cat, a granddaughter of Hall of Famer Serena's Song. Honor Code is known for his running style, in which he falls far behind the field early and closes with a rush to the wire.

Honor Code's 2013 two-year-old debut saw him win from 22 lengths behind at Saratoga Race Course. He went on to win the Remsen Stakes and also finished second in the Champagne Stakes.

He was considered a favorite for the 2014 Kentucky Derby, but an injury in March 2014 took him out of contention. Sidelined for much of 2014 by a leg injury, he returned to racing in November 2014 to win a 6 1/2-furlong allowance race/optional claiming race at Aqueduct Race Track.

In March 2015, he returned to graded stakes racing by taking the Gulfstream Park Handicap running against the favorite, Private Zone, who had won the 2014 Grade I Cigar Mile Handicap. On June 6, 2015, Honor Code won the Metropolitan Handicap at Belmont Park. On August 7, 2015, Honor Code won the Whitney Handicap by a nose over Liam's Map, with Tonalist third.

In the Eclipse Awards for 2015, Honor Code was named American Champion Older Dirt Male Horse beating Liam's Map by 126 votes to 95.

== Stud career ==
Honor Code initially stood at Lane's End Farm with a service fee of $30,000. Honor Code was eventually sold to Yushun Stallion Station in Japan in 2023.

=== Notable Progeny ===
'c = colt, f = filly, g = gelding, r = ridgling

Foaled	Name	Sex	Major Wins
2017	Honor A. P.	r	Santa Anita Derby
2017	Max Player	c	Jockey Club Gold Cup
2018	Maracuja	f	Coaching Club American Oaks
