= Jimmy Jerkens =

American Thoroughbred horse trainer (born 1959)

Personal information
- Born: January 24, 1959 (age 67) Bay Shore, New York, United States
- Occupation: Trainer

Horse racing career
- Sport: Horse racing
- Career wins: 846+ (ongoing)

Major racing wins
- Astarita Stakes (1997, 1999); Humana Distaff Handicap (2002); Brooklyn Handicap (2003, 2016); Ashland Stakes (2007); Metropolitan Handicap (2007); Acorn Stakes (2008); Florida Derby (2009); Damon Runyon Stakes (2010); Travers Stakes (2010, 2014); Wood Memorial (2014); Suburban Handicap (2015, 2016); Clark Handicap (2015); Woodward Stakes (2016); Santa Anita Handicap (2017) International wins: Woodbine Oaks (2017); Queen's Plate (2017); Crown Prince Cup (2023) Breeders' Cup wins: Breeders' Cup Mile (2005); Breeders' Cup Dirt Mile (2007)

Significant horses
- Artie Schiller, Corinthian, Sir Greeley, Shaman Ghost, Quality Road, Wicked Strong, Juba, Unified
- Updated on September 8, 2016

James A. Jerkens (born January 24, 1959, in Bay Shore, New York) is an American Thoroughbred horse trainer currently training in Saudi Arabia. His father, U.S. Racing Hall of Fame inductee H. Allen Jerkens, and brother, Steve Jerkens, are also trainers.

== Background ==
Jerkens father, H. Allen Jerkens, was a prominent New-York based trainer whose nickname in the press was "the Giant Killer" as he was best known for training horses who pulled off major upsets. The elder Jerkens, who was inducted into the Hall of Fame in 1975, died in 2015. His first wife and Jimmy Jerkens mother, Ann, died in 1986. The younger Jerkens has three siblings, Steven (also a trainer), Allen, and Julie.

Jerkens started learning horsemanship from his father at the age of 11, working part-time mucking out stalls and acting as a hot walker. In 1973, he was watching from the backstretch at Saratoga when his father's horse Onion upset Secretariat in the Whitney Handicap. In 1977, he graduated from Walt Whitman High School in Huntington Station, New York, and became an assistant trainer to his father. In 1997, the elder Jerkens suggested he start his own stable with a few horses from a longtime client.

Jerkens divorced his first wife in 1997, then married his current wife Shirley in July 2008. They were originally high school sweethearts but parted ways after several years. Shirley was also previously married and has two children, Henry and Fredericka. Shirley is a pediatric physical therapist and has been involved with horses for many years.

== Racing career ==
In 1997, Jerkens struck out on his own with just nine horses in his stable. On September 28, he won his first race with Ninth Inning at Belmont Park. Later that year, he won his first graded stakes, the Astarita, with the same filly. In 1998, he finished third in the Belmont Stakes with Thomas Jo, who also won two stakes races that year. At the 1999-2000 Aqueduct Inner Track meeting, he tied for the trainer's title with 23 wins.

He won the Breeders' Cup Mile in 2005 with Artie Schiller and the 2007 Breeders' Cup Dirt Mile with Corinthian.

In 2009, Jerkens won the Fountain of Youth Stakes and the Florida Derby with Quality Road, making the colt one of the favorites for the Kentucky Derby. In 2014, he had similar success with Wicked Strong, winner of the Wood Memorial and Jim Dandy Stakes. Later in the summer, he had a rare 1-2 finish in the Travers Stakes with Wicked Strong and winner V.E. Day. His father watched the race on television and later said, "I was screaming at the TV, 'Oh my god, he’s not gonna hang on! They’re gonna catch him!' while my daughter's in front of me jumping up and down. I said, 'Jeez, he got caught right at the end.' She said, 'Yeah, but it’s his horse.'"

Jerkens' star horse in 2015 was Effinex, who won the Suburban and Clark Handicaps and finished second to American Pharoah in the Breeders' Cup Classic. Jerkens had to be patient and resourceful to get the best out of the four-year-old colt, who trained well in the morning but could become unpredictable at race time. He made several changes including a new bit, custom blinkers and using experienced jockey Mike Smith.

In 2016, Jerkens won the Woodward Stakes with Shaman Ghost, having already won the Brooklyn Invitational and Suburban Handicap earlier that year. "I grew up watching my dad run in all these races when I was a little kid and [saw] how important it was – the Brooklyn, the Suburban, the Woodward – because we were New York people and [in] New York racing all our lives," Jerkens said. "It's what we want."

Jerkens announced in April 2023 that he would move to Saudi Arabia, where he accepted a two-year contract to train 50 to 60 horses for Faisal bin Khalid Al Saud. Jerkens said that his training business in the United States was not good in the last three years, and that he had built up a lot of debt. On August 5, 2023, Jerkens won his first race in Saudi Arabia with a horse named Honky Tonk Man. December 8, 2023, Jerkens trainee Derevo won Jerkens first cup (Stakes) race by taking the JCSA cup. A week later on December 16 Jerkens won his first Saudi (G1) race taking the Crown Prince Cup with My Frankel.
