= Art Sherman =

American horse trainer and former jockey (born 1937)

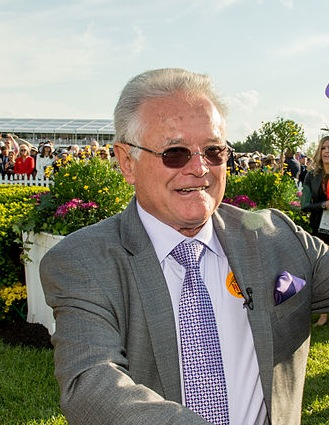
- Sherman in 2014

Personal information
- Born: February 17, 1937 (age 89) Brooklyn, New York, U.S.
- Occupation: Horse trainer

Horse racing career
- Sport: Horse racing
- Career wins: 481 (as a jockey); 2,261 (as a trainer) (as of January 21, 2015)

Major racing wins
- American Classics wins: Kentucky Derby (2014); Preakness Stakes (2014); Other Grade I wins: Dubai World Cup (2016); Clement L. Hirsch Stakes (2011); Hollywood Derby (2010, 2014); Citation Handicap (2007); Triple Bend Invitational Handicap (2006)

Significant horses
- California Chrome, Ultra Blend, Silent Lure, Haimish Hy, Lang Field
- Updated on 2015-01-21

Art Sherman (born February 17, 1937) is a former American horse trainer and jockey. At the age of 77 he became the oldest trainer to win the Kentucky Derby. He began his career as a stable hand for Rex Ellsworth and Mesh Tenney. While working in Ellsworth's barn, he was the exercise rider for the 1955 Kentucky Derby winner Swaps and 1956 Kentucky Derby entrant Terrang.

In 1957, Sherman became a licensed jockey, enjoying modest success, and began training horses in 1979. Sherman had trained ten Graded stakes winners and is credited with over 2,100 wins prior to becoming the trainer of California Chrome. He was hired to train California Chrome in 2013, due to his "old school" training techniques. Prior to the 2014 Kentucky Derby, he had conditioned the horse through four consecutive wins, and California Chrome entered the Derby as the favorite and won. Two weeks later, California Chrome also won the 2014 Preakness Stakes. Sherman is married and has two sons, Alan and Steve, both in the horse training business.

== Early life ==
Art Sherman was born in Brooklyn, New York, and is Jewish. At the age of seven, his family moved to California. Sherman became interested in horse racing while working at his father's barber shop when a customer, noticing Sherman was only 5 feet 2 inches (157 cm), suggested Sherman become a jockey. He lived in Whittier, California and attended Whittier High School.

At age 17, Sherman got a job as stable hand on Rex Ellsworth's ranch. From Ellsworth and trainer Mesh Tenney, he learned to care for, ride, and breed horses. In 1955, he was the exercise rider for Kentucky Derby winner Swaps, who was owned by Ellsworth. He rode in the train boxcar with the horse while traveling from California to Kentucky, sleeping on a bed of straw next to the horse during the four night trip. Sherman was also at the 1956 Derby as a stable hand for Ellsworth's horse Terrang, who finished 12th.

Sherman became a licensed jockey in 1957. His first win was at Hollywood Park. In 1959, he won a race in Maryland where then Vice President Richard Nixon awarded the trophy, attracting national attention. The highlight of Sherman's career came when he beat his idol and future Hall of Fame jockey Eddie Arcaro in a race. "I'll never forget that because after the race he came by and put his arm around me and said, 'You run a good race, son,'" Sherman recalled. He won over 2,000 races during his riding career. After riding for over 21 years, he retired from riding as a jockey and began training horses.

== Personal life ==
Sherman met his wife, Faye, on a blind date while riding in Chicago. Faye was working for the Illinois Central Railroad at the time, and at first found Sherman's work to be "the most boring thing that's ever been done". After they were married, she worked in the gift shop at Bay Meadows Racetrack for 30 years before retiring. One of Sherman's sons, Alan, works together with his father to train their horses. Earlier, Alan worked as a jockey. Sherman's other son, Steve, is also a trainer, working out of Golden Gate Fields. Sherman's first great-grandchild was born in June 2014.

Sherman owns a home in a north San Diego retirement community, but says he has no plans to retire. "I wouldn't know what to do with myself," he said. "[Racing] is the only thing I know. It's a great life. I can't wait to get up in the morning".

== Training career ==
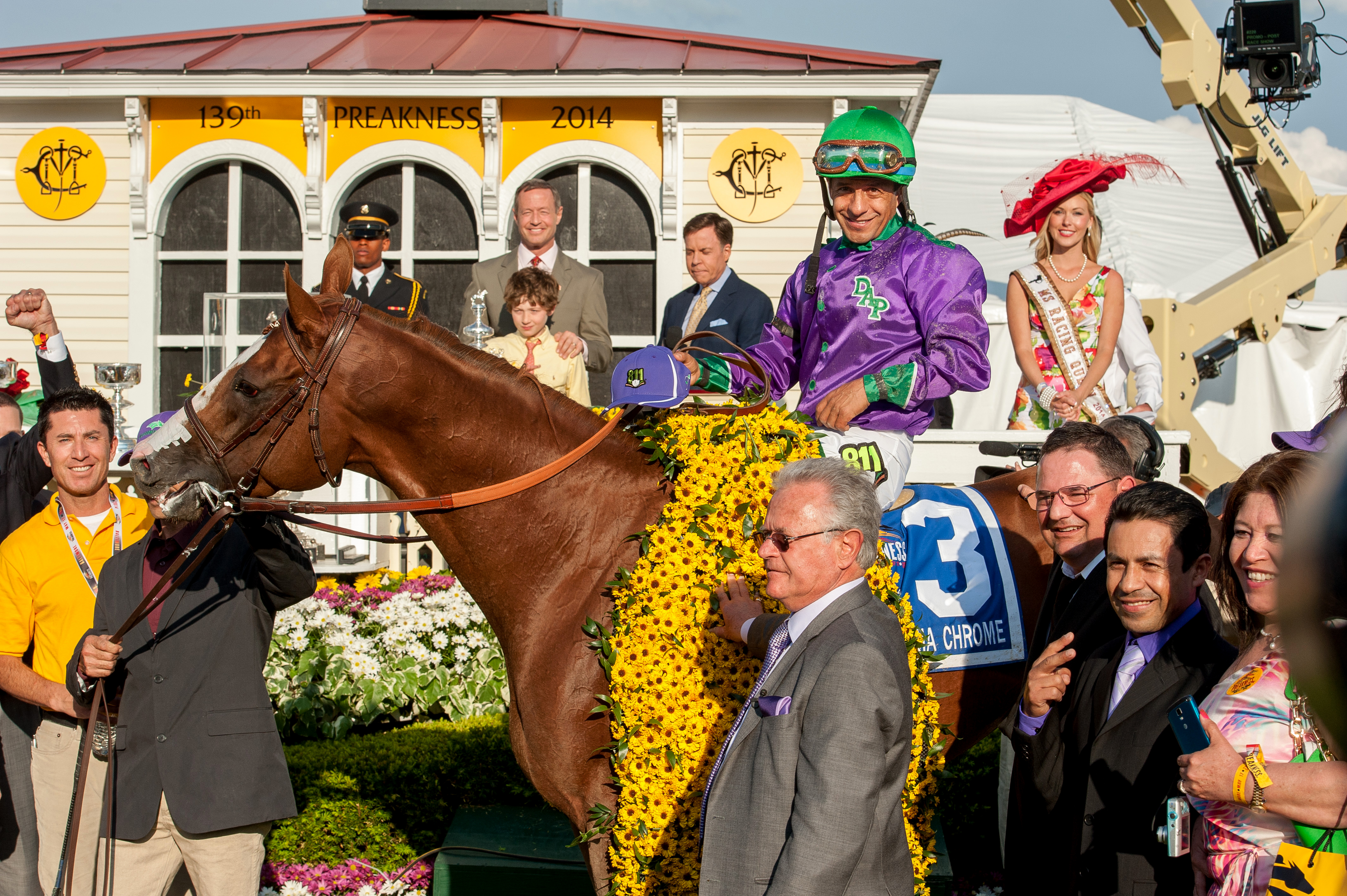
Sherman with California Chrome and jockey Victor Espinoza in the winner's circle of the 2014 Preakness Stakes

Sherman started training race horses in 1979. Prior to 2014, Sherman had 10 graded stakes winners, some of whom, trained in conjunction with his son Alan, were Grade 1 stakes winners. These included Lykatill Hill, who won back-to-back Governor's Handicaps at the California State Fair in 1996 and 1997, 2011 Clement L. Hirsch Stakes winner Ultra Blend, Haimish Hy, winner of the 2010 Hollywood Derby, 2007 Citation Handicap winner Lang Field, and Siren Lure, winner of the 2006 Triple Bend Invitational Handicap.

He has trained 50 horses at a time, but downsized to about 17 in the 2010s. As of 2014, his stable is located at Los Alamitos Race Course in Orange County, California. Sherman's horses have started more than 12,000 races, with more than 2,100 wins and $38 million of prize money. He has stated that no horse can be trained precisely the same way as another, and credits his background as a jockey in helping him train: "I've been around and I've rode so many horses, and I think because of that it's helped me tremendously."

California Chrome owners Perry Martin and Steve Coburn chose Sherman to train their horse because "he's old school. He's a regular guy ... He can spend quality time with every horse." In December 2013, California Chrome won the King Glorious Stakes, the final stakes race at Hollywood Park Racetrack, the same track Sherman had his first win as a jockey. Sherman subsequently led the horse to a four-race winning streak heading into the 2014 Kentucky Derby, including a decisive win in the Grade I Santa Anita Derby. That record made California Chrome the pre-race favorite in the 2014 Kentucky Derby, but there were still many doubters due to the horse's modest pedigree and Sherman's inexperience at the sport's highest stage. For Sherman, it was his first horse as trainer in the Derby.

Jockey Victor Espinoza held California Chrome behind the front-runners in the early part of the race, before making his move on the final turn. California Chrome pulled away from the field, just as Sherman had envisioned it, winning the Derby by 1 3/4 lengths. The win made the 77-year-old Sherman the oldest trainer to win the Kentucky Derby in the history of the race. Previously, Charlie Whittingham held the record, training Sunday Silence to win the 1989 Kentucky Derby at age 76.

Interviewed after the race, Sherman said "when I went to Swaps' grave the other day I said a little prayer and it came true. I said I hope [California Chrome] is another Swaps." He said the win was unlikely to change him because he had "been around a long time" already and added "I'm just the same old Art Sherman, you know – except, I won the Kentucky Derby." Sherman then conditioned California Chrome for the remainder of the horse's career in the United States.

=== Honors ===
In 2015 he was inducted into the Southern California Jewish Sports Hall of Fame.

== Personal life ==
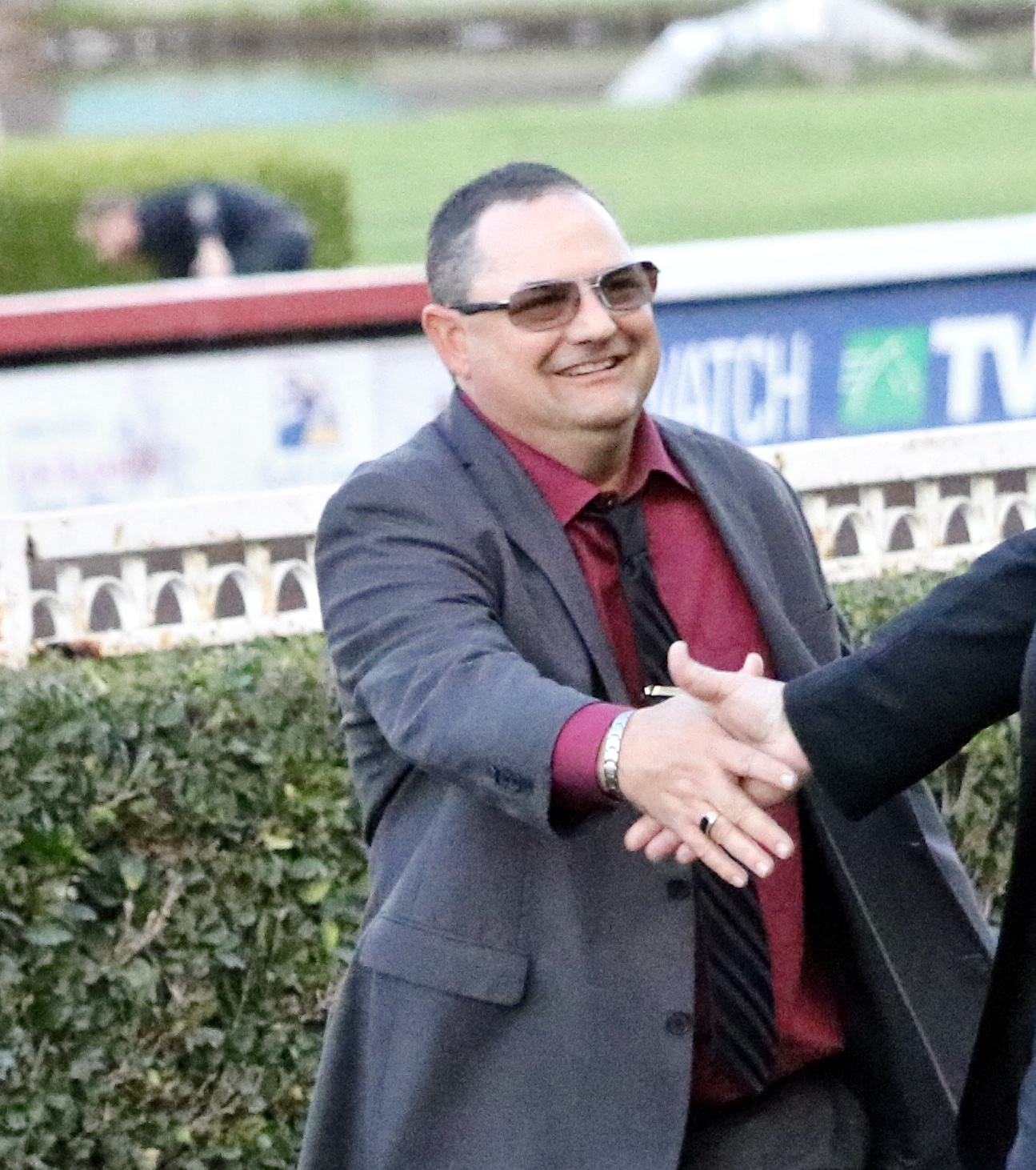
Sherman's son Alan in 2016

Art Sherman's assistant is his son, Alan, who is also a licensed trainer. Alan was a jockey for three years in the 1980s until, as he put it, "I ate my way out of that job." As a jockey, he rode in southern California for trainers such as Charlie Whittingham and won over a million dollars in purse money, while closely observing how his employers trained their horses, anticipating that some day he too would become a trainer. Rather than run an independent training stable like his brother Steve, Alan has worked with his father since 1991. He did most of the hands-on day-to-day work with California Chrome and stayed with him throughout his Triple Crown travels when Art returned to California to oversee the rest of the stable.
