= Lucky Pulpit =

American-bred Thoroughbred racehorse

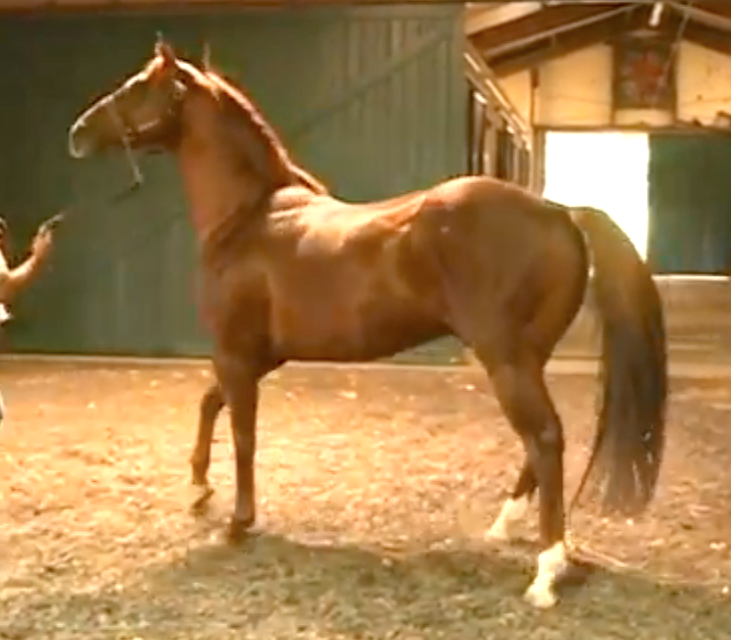
- Lucky Pulpit at Harris Farms in 2014
- Sire: Pulpit
- Grandsire: A.P. Indy
- Dam: Lucky Soph
- Damsire: Cozzene
- Sex: Stallion
- Foaled: February 10, 2001
- Died: February 13, 2017 (aged 16)
- Country: United States
- Color: Chestnut
- Breeder: Larry and Marianne Williams
- Owner: Larry and Marianne Williams
- Trainer: Grant Forster; Todd A. Pletcher
- Record: 22: 3-5-5
- Earnings: $209,928

Major wins
- Smile Stakes (2005)

Awards
- 2016 Top California Sire by Earnings; 2016 Top California Sire by Number of Winners; 2010 Top California Freshman Sire

Lucky Pulpit (foaled February 10, 2001– February 13, 2017) was an American Thoroughbred stallion who stood at Harris Farms in Coalinga, California. Lucky Pulpit was a son of the Blue Grass Stakes winner Pulpit, and grandson of the 1992 United States Horse of the Year A.P. Indy. Although his own racing career was limited due to respiratory issues, Lucky Pulpit was best known as the sire of California Chrome, two-time American Horse of the Year, winner of the 2014 Kentucky Derby and 2014 Preakness Stakes and all-time leading North American horse in earnings won. At the time of Lucky Pulpit's death in 2017, he had sired 148 winners from 229 starters and was credited with progeny earnings of $24 million.

== Background ==
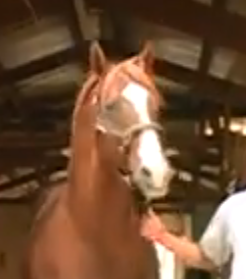
Lucky Pulpit head shot

Lucky Pulpit was a chestnut stallion with a blaze and white socks on his hind legs bred in Kentucky and owned by Larry and Marianne Williams. He was sired by Pulpit, who won the Blue Grass Stakes in 1997 before becoming a successful breeding stallion. Pulpit's other offspring include Tapit, Ice Box, Corinthian, and Stardom Bound. Lucky Pulpit's dam, Lucky Soph, was foaled in California and was sent to the United Kingdom as a yearling to race. She won one race, the class D Longhill Maiden Fillies Stakes at Ayr, as a three-year-old in 1994. Lucky Soph is a three-quarter sister to the mare Trolley Song, the dam of multiple stakes winner and sire Unbridled's Song. Lucky Pulpit's half-brother Drewman was third in the Iowa Derby and second in the Diplomat Way Stakes with combined winnings of $88,852.

When Lucky Pulpit was a weanling, he was sent to the Tree Top Ranches in Parma, Idaho. It was in Idaho that he was started under saddle by Dan Kiser, the manager and trainer for the Williamses, before being shipped to California to begin racing.

== Racing career ==
Lucky Pulpit earned $209,928 in 22 starts. He began his career by running six races as a two-year-old in 2003, winning two and finishing in the top three in all but one race. He contracted a viral infection at the beginning of his three-year-old season in 2004 which led to permanent respiratory problems. His difficulty breathing affected his ability to train before races, which often meant that his only time on the track was during races. Nonetheless, he ran seven times as a three-year-old, with his best finish a second place in the grade II Santa Catalina Stakes. Having run only in California up to that point, he was shipped east in 2005 and ran on midwestern and eastern tracks for the remainder of his career. He ran eight times in 2005, winning the non-graded Smile Stakes at Arlington Park. After a second-place finish in an allowance race at Churchill Downs in November 2005, he only ran once in August 2006 before retiring, finishing second in the non-graded Sneakbox Stakes at Monmouth Park.

== Stud career ==
Lucky Pulpit sired seven foal crops. At the time of his death in 2017, he had sired 148 winners from 229 starters and was credited with progeny earnings of $24 million. In addition to California Chrome, Lucky Pulpit sired several other stakes winners: Rousing Sermon, who was a California Champion Two-Year-Old Colt; as well as Luckarack, a multiple stakes winner; Gatheratthealter. and You're Late. After California Chrome won the 2014 San Felipe Stakes, Lucky Pulpit's stud fee increased from the 2013 fee of $2,500 to $10,000.

On February 13, 2017, Lucky Pulpit died at Harris Farms of a heart attack after covering his first mare of the season. His stud fee was $7500 at the time of his death.

== Pedigree ==
Pedigree of Lucky Pulpit (USA), chestnut horse, 2001
Sire Pulpit (USA) 1994	A.P. Indy (USA); 1989	Seattle Slew	Bold Reasoning
Sire Pulpit (USA) 1994	A.P. Indy (USA); 1989	Seattle Slew	My Charmer
Sire Pulpit (USA) 1994	A.P. Indy (USA); 1989	Weekend Surprise	Secretariat
Sire Pulpit (USA) 1994	A.P. Indy (USA); 1989	Weekend Surprise	Lassie Dear
Sire Pulpit (USA) 1994	Preach (USA); 1989	Mr. Prospector	Raise a Native
Sire Pulpit (USA) 1994	Preach (USA); 1989	Mr. Prospector	Gold Digger
Sire Pulpit (USA) 1994	Preach (USA); 1989	Narrate	Honest Pleasure
Sire Pulpit (USA) 1994	Preach (USA); 1989	Narrate	State
Dam Lucky Soph (USA) 1992	Cozzene (USA); 1980	Caro	Fortino
Dam Lucky Soph (USA) 1992	Cozzene (USA); 1980	Caro	Chambord
Dam Lucky Soph (USA) 1992	Cozzene (USA); 1980	Ride the Trails	Prince John
Dam Lucky Soph (USA) 1992	Cozzene (USA); 1980	Ride the Trails	Wildwook
Dam Lucky Soph (USA) 1992	Lucky Spell (USA); 1971	Lucky Mel	Olympia
Dam Lucky Soph (USA) 1992	Lucky Spell (USA); 1971	Lucky Mel	Royal Mink
Dam Lucky Soph (USA) 1992	Lucky Spell (USA); 1971	Incantation	Prince Blessed
Dam Lucky Soph (USA) 1992	Lucky Spell (USA); 1971	Incantation	Magic Spell (Family: 4-m)
