= Frosted (horse) =

American thoroughbred racehorse (2012–2026)

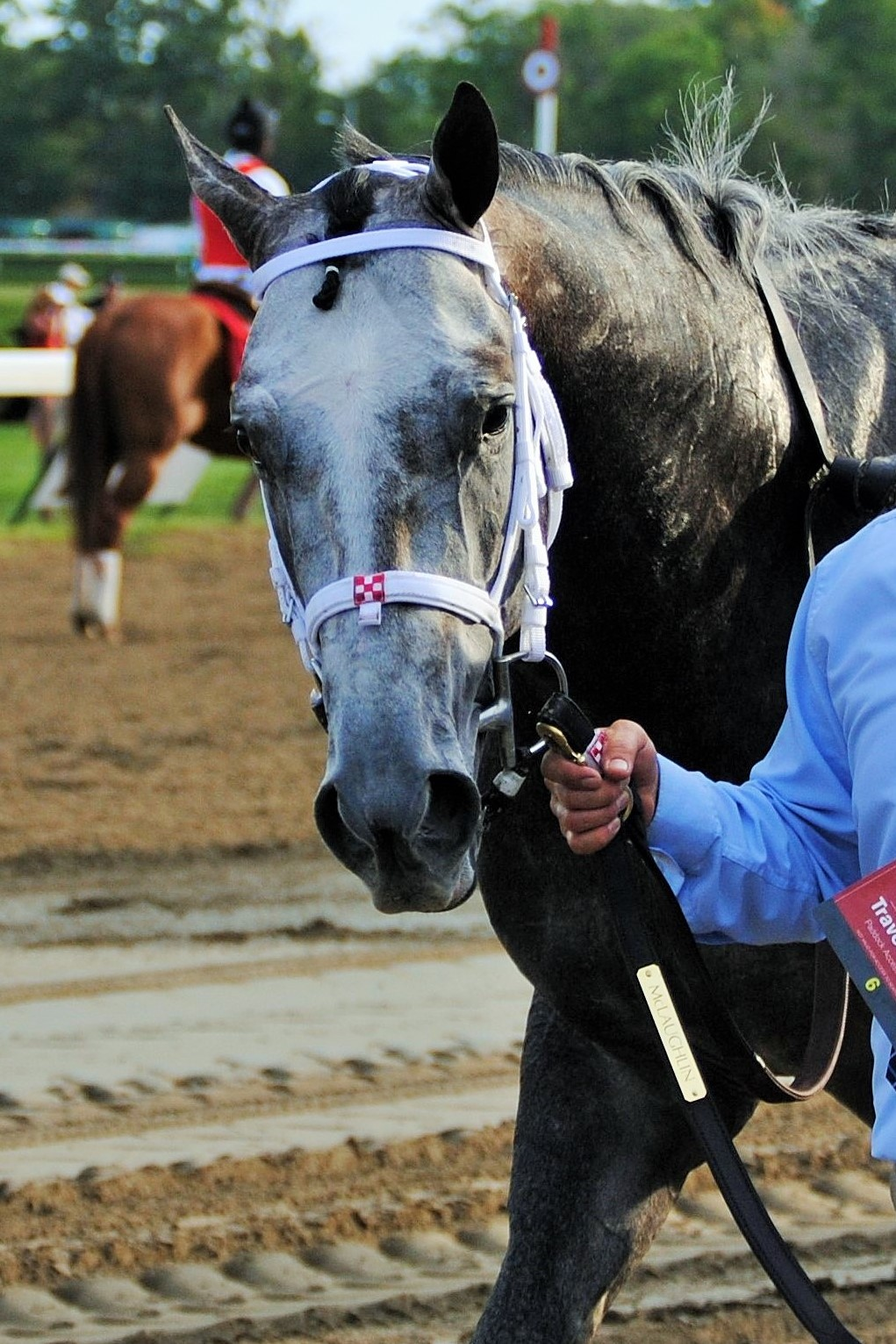
- Frosted after the 2015 Travers
- Sire: Tapit
- Grandsire: Pulpit
- Dam: Fast Cookie
- Damsire: Deputy Minister
- Sex: Colt
- Foaled: April 18, 2012
- Died: April 15, 2026 (aged 13)
- Country: United States
- Colour: Gray
- Breeder: Darley
- Owner: Godolphin
- Trainer: Kiaran McLaughlin
- Record: 19: 6-6-2
- Earnings: $3,972,800

Major wins
- Wood Memorial Stakes (2015); Pennsylvania Derby (2015); Al Maktoum Challenge, Round 2 (2016); Metropolitan Handicap (2016); Whitney Handicap (2016)
- Last updated on April 15, 2026

Frosted (April 18, 2012 – April 15, 2026) was an American Thoroughbred racehorse. In 2016, he set a stakes record while winning the Metropolitan Handicap in a "dazzling performance" and followed up with a win in the Whitney Handicap. Prior to that, despite winning several stakes races, he was best known for finishing behind American Pharoah four times, including a runner-up performance in the 2015 Belmont Stakes.

== Background ==
Frosted was a gray colt, a color he inherited from leading sire Tapit, whose other offspring include the 2014 Belmont Stakes winner Tonalist and 2016 Belmont Stakes winner Creator. Frosted's dam, Fast Cookie, was a graded stakes winner in 2003 for Stonerside Farm and was acquired by Darley when it purchased Stonerside in 2008. Fast Cookie produced three winners from her first three foals to race (Macaroon and With Sugar On Top being the others), with Frosted being her first stakes winner.

Frosted was owned by Godolphin and was conditioned by Kiaran McLaughlin, who has trained for Godolphin since 1993, including several years spent in the United Arab Emirates.

== Racing career ==
Racing silks of Godolphin

=== 2014: two-year-old season ===
Frosted first ran on August 23 in a 6-furlong maiden special weight race at Saratoga. He broke slowly and raced at the back of the pack, then made a 4-wide move around the turn to finish second. On September 20 at Belmont Park, he was closer to the pace but again finished second after shying at the whip in the stretch. In his third start on October 20 at Aqueduct, he pressed the pace, then drew away in the stretch to win easily. He finished his two-year-old campaign on November 29 in the Remsen Stakes at Aqueduct. He pressed the pace while racing wide, then dueled the leader down the stretch to come up just short.

=== 2015: three-year-old season ===
Frosted started his three-year-old campaign on January 24 in the Holy Bull Stakes at Gulfstream Park. He was bumped at the start, then stalked the pace from the inside. He made a run coming into the stretch but could not make up ground on the winner, Upstart, being "clearly second best" according to the chart. For his next start in the Fountain of Youth Stakes, Frosted pressed the pace and took a clear lead rounding the turn. In the stretch, he slowed, drifted wide, and bumped Upstart, who in turn bumped Itsaknockout. Frosted faded to fourth, and Upstart was disqualified.

It was later discovered that Frosted had suffered from a trapped epiglottis during the race, obstructing his breathing. Trainer Kiaran McLaughlin had a minor surgical procedure performed on his throat, added blinkers, and changed jockeys to Joel Rosario. Frosted was entered in the Wood Memorial on April 4 at Aqueduct, the track at which he had broken his maiden back in October. Frosted responded with a victory despite racing wide around the final turn. "We went wide, but he was out of trouble and in the clear," said McLaughlin. "It was a very good race. I don't care how he did it; to get here first was most important in this race."

In the 2015 Kentucky Derby, Frosted was the 5th betting choice in a field of 18. He broke poorly and was rank for the first quarter mile before settling near the back of the pack. He started to make up ground down the backstretch, raced very wide around the far turn, and closed steadily down the stretch to finish fourth, just over 3 lengths behind winner American Pharoah and a neck behind Firing Line and Dortmund for fourth.

Frosted skipped the Preakness Stakes to prepare for the 2015 Belmont Stakes, in which American Pharoah was attempting to win the Triple Crown. Frosted stalked the pace and made his move as the rounded into the stretch. He quickly advanced into second place but proved no match for American Pharoah, who won by 5 1/2 lengths. Keen Ice finished third, two lengths behind Frosted.

Frosted's next start was on August 1 in the Jim Dandy Stakes at Saratoga. Only four horses went to the post as there were two defections to the Haskell Invitational, which had an increased purse due to the presence of American Pharoah. Frosted raced in third for the first mile and went wide around both turns. Coming into the stretch, Texas Red, winner of the 2014 Breeders' Cup Juvenile, kicked clear of the field. Frosted closed hard but could not get by, settling for another second.

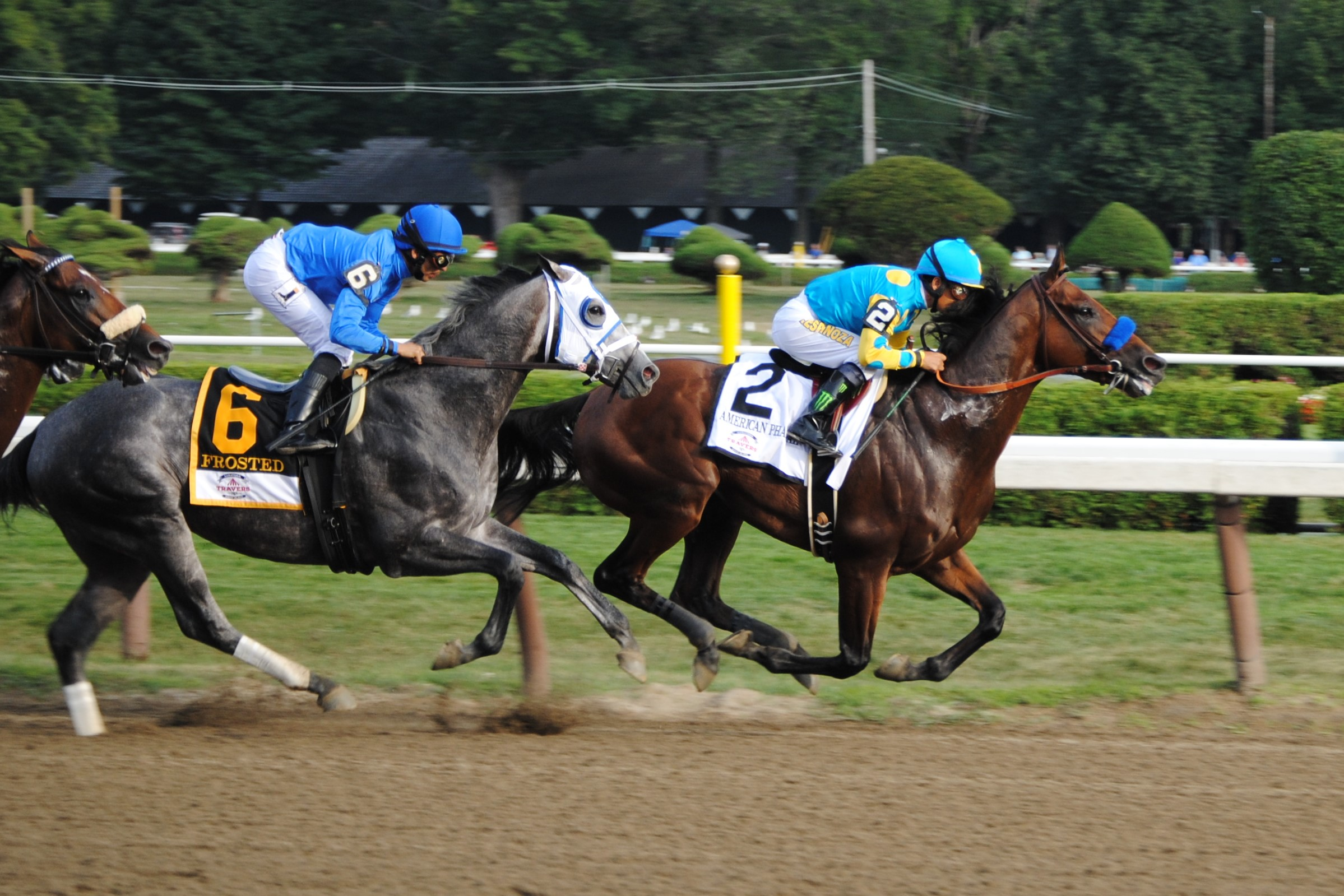
Frosted pressed American Pharoah for much of the 2015 Travers Stakes

In the Travers Stakes, Frosted pressed American Pharoah hard, especially from after the first half-mile, when the pace quickened significantly. The horses bumped repeatedly around the turn, and Frosted took a temporary lead. This change from Frosted's previous stalking style was attributed to a rider change less than an hour before the race, when Jose Lezcano replaced an injured Joel Rosario. The unexpected tactics of Lezcano may have been decisive as neither horse had enough energy left after a fast opening mile to withstand the charge of Keen Ice down the stretch. American Pharoah finished second with Frosted in third. "We didn't want to engage (American Pharoah) that early but Jose rode him well," said McLaughlin. "We always break well, but just try to sit third to fifth. He took it upon himself to go and engage him early because no one else was there. It was unfortunate for us and maybe for American Pharoah, too."

On September 19, Frosted traveled to Parx Racing for the Pennsylvania Derby. Facing a field of 9 and with Joel Rosario again up, he returned to his usual tactics, stalking the pace for the first 3/4 of a mile. Going 3-wide around the final turn, Frosted took the lead coming into the stretch and won under a hand ride. "He's a top horse and the last three out of his last four runs have been against American Pharoah, so it's great he wasn't here and we were able to shine today," McLaughlin said.

On October 31, Frosted entered the Breeders' Cup Classic, facing older horses for the first time and American Pharoah for the last time. Frosted took up his normal stalking position several lengths behind American Pharoah, then started to make his move on the turn. But when trying to go between horses, he was bumped hard into the rail and tailed off, eventually finishing seventh.

=== 2016: four-year-old season ===
Frosted shipped to Dubai in early 2016 with the Dubai World Cup as the target. His first start was on February 4 in the Al Maktoum Challenge, Round 2 at a distance of 1900 metres (roughly 1 3/16 miles). Betting is illegal in Dubai, but Frosted was the favorite in the American simulcast pool. He settled behind a slow pace, then made his move on the turn only to be fanned wide by the pacesetter. Frosted adjusted and drew away to win by 5 lengths in track record time.

McLaughlin had originally considered racing Frosted in Round 3 of the Al Maktoum Challenge in early March but ultimately decided to train him up to the Dubai World Cup at Godolphin's Al Marmoon stables. "It was the first time he had really run off an extended break and he set the track record in the process. He answered all the questions and he obviously runs well fresh," said McLaughlin.

An international field of twelve horses went to the post on March 25 to contest the Dubai World Cup. California Chrome, the 2014 American Horse of the Year, tracked the pace on the outside for about a mile before drawing clear to win. Frosted was stalking a few lengths further back but had no response in the stretch and finished fifth. "The race went well," said his jockey, William Buick. "We were tracking California Chrome the whole way, but Frosted came off the bridle a little bit early. He wasn't as good today and I'm not sure why."

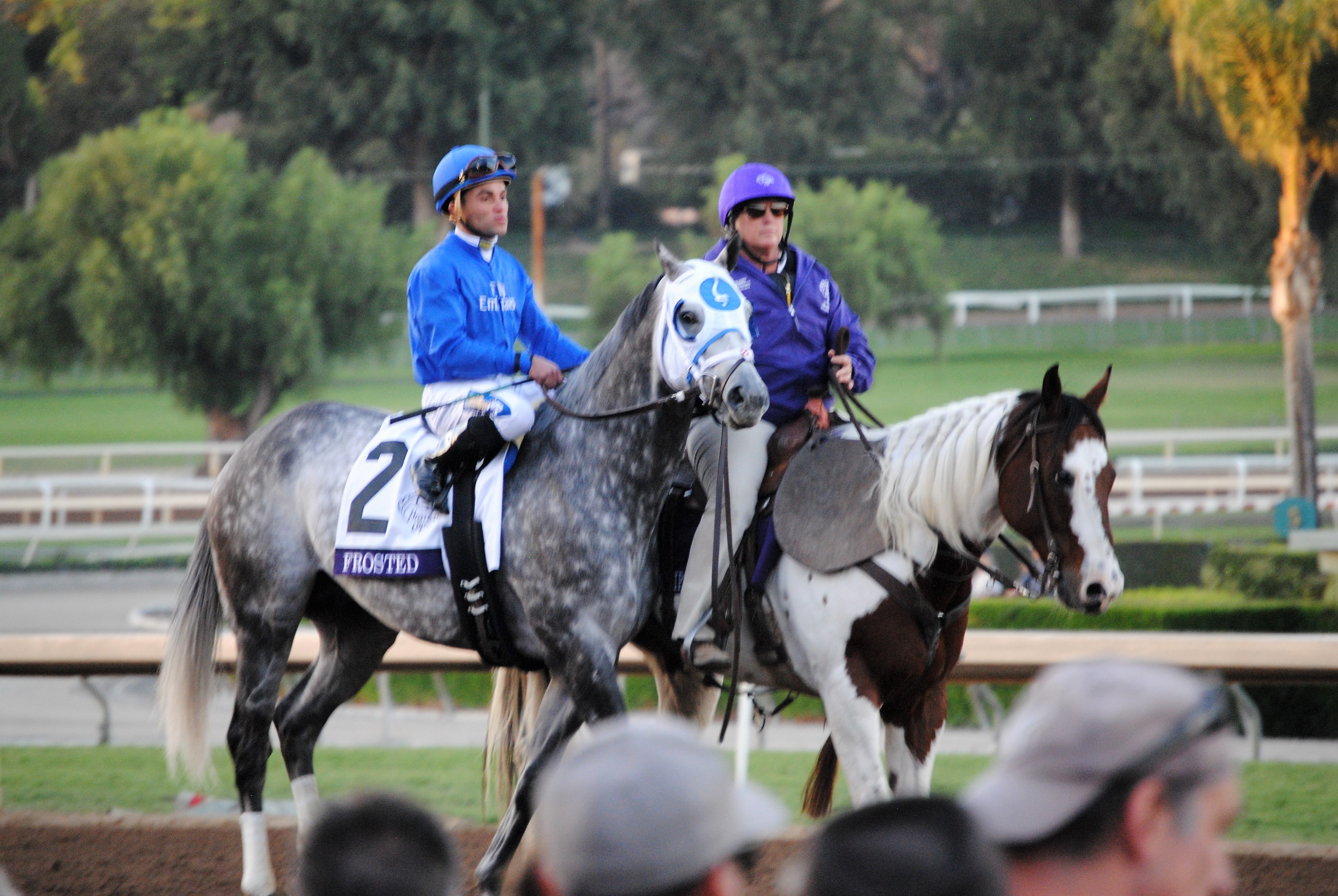
Frosted at the 2016 Breeders' Cup Classic

Frosted returned to the United States and was originally set to return to racing in the Suburban Handicap in early July. He was training well, though, so McLaughlin decided not to wait and entered him in the Metropolitan Handicap, more popularly known as the Met Mile, run on June 11. Frosted stalked the pace, then made a four-wide move around the turn and burst clear of the field, drawing off to win by 14 1/4 lengths while geared down. The winning margin is believed to be the largest in the 132-year history of the race, and the time of 1:32.73 was a stakes record. The Daily Racing Form called it "an absolutely scintillating performance." After the race, McLaughin said it was one of the highlights of his training career: "Way up there in the top five, for sure. It's our biggest win for Godolphin ever... he's such a talented horse and has everything." The win earned Frosted an automatic berth in the Breeders' Cup Dirt Mile as part of the Breeders' Cup Challenge "Win and You're In" series.

On August 6, Frosted entered the 1 1/8 mile Whitney Handicap at Saratoga as the 1-2 favorite against a field of five other horses. He broke well and went to the early lead, joined by Upstart and Noble Bird. The opening fractions were fast, but Frosted was moving comfortably and opened a lead coming into the stretch, winning by two lengths. "I knew he probably went a little too fast — more than normal," said Rosario. "Sometimes he's a little difficult, and you have to let him do what he wants to do, but when I turned for home I knew I had something left because I know the way he likes to run." With the victory, Frosted earned a "Win and You're In" berth for the 2016 Breeders' Cup Classic, thus qualifying for two different Breeders' Cup races.

Frosted next entered the Woodward Stakes on September 3, where he was made the 2-5 favorite in a nine horse field. He broke poorly and raced in sixth place for the first half mile, further from the lead than was his custom. He started his move on the far turn but was fanned extremely wide, losing a considerable amount of ground compared to horses running on the rail. Under a hand ride from Rosario, Frosted hit the lead in mid-stretch, only to have Shaman Ghost and Mubtahiij close ground rapidly in the final furlong. At the wire, four horses were heads apart, with Frosted in third. "It wasn't our day," said McLaughlin. "He had a bad trip and the winner ran big." Rosario was criticized for not riding harder, although McLaughlin defended him by pointing out the horse's longstanding aversion to the whip. McLaughlin also noted that under the allowance conditions of the race, Frosted carried 4 pounds more weight than the winner, Shaman Ghost, and six pounds more than the runner-up, Mubtahiij.

Frosted trained up to the Breeders' Cup, held at Santa Anita on November 5. His connections elected to enter him in the Classic, in which he was ranked behind California Chrome and Arrogate, rather than entering him in the Dirt Mile, for which he would have been the likely favorite based on his performance in the Met Mile. He was bumped at the start and again in the stretch and finished sixth.

== Statistics ==
| Date | Age | Distance | Race | Grade | Track | Odds | Field | Finish | Winning time | Winning (Losing) margin | Jockey | Ref |
|---|---|---|---|---|---|---|---|---|---|---|---|---|
| Aug 23, 2014 | 2 | 6 furlongs | Maiden Special Weight | Maiden | Saratoga | 7.00 | 9 | 2 | 1:11.48 | (11 1/2) lengths | Rajiv Maragh | |
| Sep 20, 2014 | 2 | 6 1/2 furlongs | Maiden Special Weight | Maiden | Belmont Park | 3.50 | 11 | 2 | 1:16.11 | (3/4) lengths | Dylan Davis | |
| Oct 30, 2014 | 2 | 1 mile | Maiden Special Weight | Maiden | Aqueduct | 0.60 | 8 | 1 | 1:36.19 | 5 1/4 lengths | Irad Ortiz | |
| Oct 30, 2014 | 2 | 1 1/8 mile | Remsen Stakes | II | Aqueduct | 1.80 | 13 | 2 | 1:51.06 | (1/2) lengths | Irad Ortiz | |
| Jan 24, 2015 | 3 | 1 1/16 miles | Holy Bull Stakes | II | Gulfstream | 1.50 | 9 | 2 | 1:43.61 | (5 1/2) lengths | Irad Ortiz | |
| Feb 21, 2015 | 3 | 1 1/16 miles | Fountain of Youth Stakes | II | Gulfstream | 3.80 | 8 | 4 | 1:46.28 | (4 3/4) lengths | Irad Ortiz | |
| Apr 4, 2015 | 3 | 1 1/8 miles | Wood Memorial | I | Aqueduct | 2.20 | 7 | 1 | 1:50.31 | 2 lengths | Joel Rosario | |
| May 2, 2015 | 3 | 1 1/4 miles | Kentucky Derby | I | Churchill Downs | 10.30 | 18 | 4 | 2:03.02 | (3 1/4) lengths | Joel Rosario | |
| Jun 6, 2015 | 3 | 1 1/2 miles | Belmont Stakes | I | Belmont Park | 4.10 | 8 | 2 | 2:26.65 | (5 1/2) lengths | Joel Rosario | |
| Aug 1, 2015 | 3 | 1 1/8 miles | Jim Dandy Stakes | II | Saratoga | 0.75 | 4 | 2 | 1:48.77 | (1/2) lengths | Joel Rosario | |
| Aug 29, 2015 | 3 | 1 1/4 miles | Travers Stakes | I | Saratoga | 7.60 | 10 | 3 | 2:01.57 | (3) lengths | Jose Lezcano | |
| Sep 19, 2015 | 3 | 1 1/8 miles | Pennsylvania Derby | II | Parx | 1.00 | 9 | 1 | 1:50.04 | 2 lengths | Joel Rosario | |
| Oct 31, 2015 | 3 | 1 1/4 miles | Breeders' Cup Classic | I | Keeneland | 11.30 | 8 | 7 | 2:00.07 | (12 3/4) lengths | Joel Rosario | |
| Feb 4, 2016 | 4 | 1900 metres (about 1 3/16 miles) | Al Maktoum Challenge, Round 2 | II | Meydan | | 9 | 1 | 1:56.67 | 5 lengths | William Buick | |
| Mar 26, 2016 | 4 | 2000 metres (about 1 1/4 miles) | Dubai World Cup | I | Meydan | | 12 | 5 | 2:01.83 | (5 1/4) lengths | William Buick | |
| Jun 11, 2016 | 4 | 1 mile | Metropolitan Handicap | I | Belmont Park | 2.35 | 10 | 1 | 1:32.73 | 14 1/4 lengths | Joel Rosario | |
| Aug 6, 2016 | 4 | 1 1/8 miles | Whitney Handicap | I | Saratoga | 0.50 | 6 | 1 | 1:47.77 | 2 lengths | Joel Rosario | |
| Sep 3, 2016 | 4 | 1 1/8 miles | Woodward Stakes | I | Saratoga | 0.40 | 9 | 3 | 1:48.92 | (head) | Joel Rosario | |
| Nov 5, 2016 | 4 | 1 1/4 miles | Breeders' Cup Classic | I | Santa Anita | 8.40 | 9 | 6 | 2:00.11 | (15 1/2) lengths | Joel Rosario | |

== Retirement and stud career ==
After the Classic, Frosted was retired to stud at Jonabell Farm, the Kentucky division of Darley. His initial stud fee was $50,000. It was announced Spring 2017 that Frosted would shuttle to Darley's stallion operation in Australia for the southern hemisphere breeding season.

Frosted's first reported foal was a filly out of mare Snow Top Mountain born January 15 in Virginia. Snow Top Mountain won the Suwannee River Stakes and All Along Stakes and also produced Bob Hope Stakes winner Greyvitos by Malibu Moon. The first North American winner for Frosted was also a filly, a bay named Inject, who won on debut at Ellis Park in August 2020. Inject is out of the mare Appealing Zophie, who won the Spinaway Stakes while racing and produced 2017 Belmont Stakes winner Tapwrit.

Colt Ingratiating was the first stakes winner worldwide for Frosted, and also his first stakes winner in Australia.

His stud fee for the 2025 breeding season was $15,000.

Frosted was euthanized on April 15, 2026, at the age of 13, after suffering from acute laminitis. His death coincided with one of his progenies, Dragon Welds, winning the JpnIII Tokyo Sprint.

=== Progeny ===
Frosted's top progeny include:

c = colt, f = filly, g = gelding

| Foaled | Name | Sex | Major Wins |
| 2018 | Travel Column | f | Golden Rod Stakes (2020), Fair Grounds Oaks (2021) |
| 2018 | Cloudy | f | SAJC Breeders' Stakes (2021) |
| 2018 | Ingratiating | c | Vain Stakes (2021), Bletchingly Stakes (2023) |
| 2018 | Frosted Over | g | Ontario Derby (2021), Dominion Day Stakes (2022) |
| 2020 | Arctic Glamour | f | Hot Danish Stakes (2025) |

== Pedigree ==
Frosted was by Tapit, the Leading sire in North America in 2014, 2015 and 2016. Tapit's other notable offspring include champions Stardom Bound, Hansel and Untapable, and 2014 Belmont Stakes winner Tonalist.

Frosted's dam Fast Cookie won on turf and dirt, at sprint and longer distances, including a win in the Cotillion Handicap. She produced three winners from her first three starters: sprint winner Macaroon, also by Tapit, and With Sugar On Top by Unbridled's Song. Fast Cookie is by Deputy Minister, an outstanding broodmare sire. Fast Cookie's dam is Fleet Lady, who was also a stakes winner at sprint and longer distances, including the La Cañada Stakes. In addition to Fast Cookie, Fleet Lady produced Champion two-year-old colt Midshipman.

Pedigree of Frosted (USA), gray colt, 2012
| Sire Tapit (USA) 2001 | Pulpit; 1994 | A.P. Indy | Seattle Slew |
| Sire Tapit (USA) 2001 | Pulpit; 1994 | A.P. Indy | Weekend Surprise |
| Sire Tapit (USA) 2001 | Pulpit; 1994 | Preach | Mr. Prospector |
| Sire Tapit (USA) 2001 | Pulpit; 1994 | Preach | Narrate |
| Sire Tapit (USA) 2001 | Tap Your Heels; 1996 | Unbridled | Fappiano |
| Sire Tapit (USA) 2001 | Tap Your Heels; 1996 | Unbridled | Gana Facil |
| Sire Tapit (USA) 2001 | Tap Your Heels; 1996 | Ruby Slippers | Nijinsky |
| Sire Tapit (USA) 2001 | Tap Your Heels; 1996 | Ruby Slippers | Moon Glitter |
| Dam Fast Cookie 2000 | Deputy Minister; 1979 | Vice Regent | Northern Dancer |
| Dam Fast Cookie 2000 | Deputy Minister; 1979 | Vice Regent | Victoria Regina |
| Dam Fast Cookie 2000 | Deputy Minister; 1979 | Mint Copy | Bunty's Flight |
| Dam Fast Cookie 2000 | Deputy Minister; 1979 | Mint Copy | Shakeney |
| Dam Fast Cookie 2000 | Fleet Lady; 1994 | Avenue of Flags | Seattle Slew |
| Dam Fast Cookie 2000 | Fleet Lady; 1994 | Avenue of Flags | Beautiful Glass |
| Dam Fast Cookie 2000 | Fleet Lady; 1994 | Dear Mimi | Roberto |
| Dam Fast Cookie 2000 | Fleet Lady; 1994 | Dear Mimi | Carnival Princess (Family: 16-g) |

Frosted is inbred 4 × 4 to Seattle Slew, meaning Seattle Slew appears twice in the fourth generation of Frosted's pedigree. He is also inbred 5 × 4 to Northern Dancer, and 4 × 5 to Mr. Prospector.
