= Untapable =

American-bred Thoroughbred racehorse

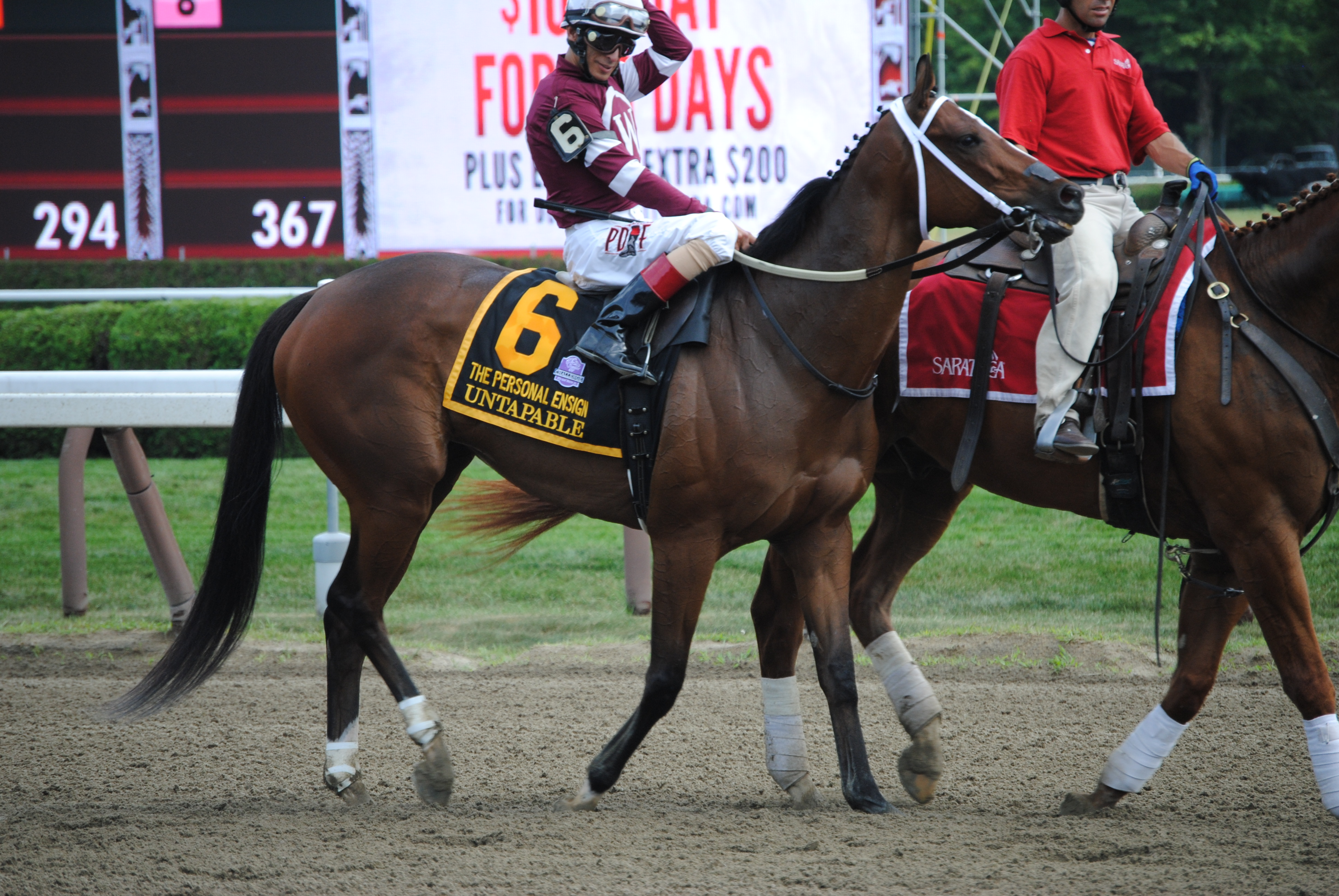
- Untapable at Saratoga in 2015
- Sire: Tapit
- Grandsire: Pulpit
- Dam: Fun House
- Damsire: Prized
- Sex: Filly
- Foaled: 13 February 2011
- Country: United States
- Colour: Bay
- Breeder: Winchell Thoroughbreds
- Owner: Ron Winchell
- Trainer: Steve Asmussen
- Record: 20: 9–5–2
- Earnings: $3,886,725

Major wins
- Pocahontas Stakes (2013); Rachel Alexandra Stakes (2014); Fair Grounds Oaks (2014); Kentucky Oaks (2014); Mother Goose Stakes (2014); Cotillion Handicap (2014); Breeders' Cup Distaff (2014); Apple Blossom Handicap (2015)

Awards
- American Champion Three-Year-Old Filly
- Last updated on 17 February 2022

Untapable (foaled 13 February 2011) is an American Thoroughbred racehorse. She showed promise as a two-year-old in 2013 when she won two of her four races including the Pocahontas Stakes and was placed in the Starlet Stakes. In 2014 she emerged as a top-class racehorse, winning the Rachel Alexandra Stakes, Fair Grounds Oaks, Kentucky Oaks, Mother Goose Stakes, Cotillion Handicap and Breeders' Cup Distaff and was named American Champion Three-Year-Old Filly.

== Background ==
Untapable is a bay filly with a white blaze and three white leg markings bred in Kentucky by Winchell Thoroughbreds. She was sired by Tapit, a gray son of Pulpit, who won the Wood Memorial Stakes and started second favorite for the 2004 Kentucky Derby. Tapit has become a successful breeding stallion with other progeny, including Tonalist, Hansen, Stardom Bound, Tapitsfly (Breeders' Cup Juvenile Fillies Turf) and Tapizar (Breeders' Cup Dirt Mile). Untapable's dam Fun House was a successful racemare who won five races including the Grade II Buena Vista Handicap. Fun House's dam Bistra was a half-sister to the Hollywood Derby winner Olympio.

Untapable is trained by Steve Asmussen and has been ridden in most of her races by Rosie Napravnik.

== Racing career ==
=== 2013: two-year-old season ===
Untapable began her racing career at Churchill Downs. In a maiden race on June 20, 2013, she took the lead soon after the start and won by a length from Harlan's Special. In September, Untapable was moved up in class and distance for the Grade II Pocahontas Stakes over 8 1/2 furlongs and finished strongly to win by half a length from tonetastic at odds of 5.8/1. On November 2, Untapable started the 11/2 fourth choice in the betting for the Breeders' Cup Juvenile Fillies at Santa Anita Park. She appeared beaten when hampered by the fall of Secret Compass and came home eighth of the nine finishers behind the subsequently disqualified She's a Tiger. Joseph Talamo took over the ride from Napravnik when Untapable ran in the Starlet Stakes at Hollywood Park Racetrack on December 7 when the filly finished third behind Streaming and Taste Like Candy.

=== 2014: three-year-old season ===
Untapable began her three-year-old season at Fair Grounds Race Course in New Orleans, Louisiana. On February 22 in the Grade III Rachel Alexandra Stakes over nine furlongs she started third favorite behind Ria Antonia and Got Lucky. She raced on the outside before moving up to take the lead in the straight and won very easily by 9 1/2 lengths from Got Lucky. After the race Asmussen said "The filly acted extremely well today...we just think she's a better mare than she was last year, and she showed it today" whilst Napravnik commented "I had lots of confidence in her. It was a wide trip which just goes to show you how much the best she was". Five weeks later she started 1/2 favorite for the Grade II Fair Grounds Oaks over 8 1/2 furlongs. She took the lead a quarter of a mile from the finish and drew away in the closing stages to win by seven and three quarter lengths from Fiftyshadesofgold. Asmussen said "She has grown up a lot, and she has great composure... and she's fast. I like how she was handled by Rosie, how she relaxed, and she ran big, especially off such a fast effort in the Rachel Alexandra" whilst Napravnik admitted to being "very excited about her". On May 2, Untapable started favorite for the Kentucky Oaks over nine furlongs at Churchill Downs with her main opposition appearing to come from the Gazelle Stakes winner My Miss Sophia and the Ashland Stakes winner Rosalind. Drawn wide in stall 13, the filly settled in fourth place before moving up to take the lead from My Miss Sophia on the final turn. In the straight she went clear of her opponents before being eased in the closing stages to win by 4 1/2 lengths. After the race, Napravnik commented "She was really great. She got into a great stride and relaxed. She is magnificent".

On June 28, Untapable started at odds of 1/20 for the Mother Goose Stakes over 8 1/2 furlongs at Belmont Park. After being hampered in the early stages, Untapable, ridden by John Velazquez moved up to take the lead on the final turn and pulled clear to win by nine and a quarter lengths from Princess Violet. Untapable's connections opted to race her against colts in her next race, hoping she could become the third filly, after Serena's Song and Rachel Alexandra to win the Haskell Invitational over nine furlongs at Monmouth Park. Racing on the outside of the field, Untapable (the 7/5 favorite) made some progress approaching the straight but never threatened the wire–to–wire winner Bayern and finished fifth, beaten more than nine lengths. Napravnik reported that "the horse next to us (Social Inclusion) acted up in the gate, so she got a little fussy and didn't get away well. We had the widest trip of everybody; she ran a hell of a race and ran as hard as she could".

Untapable returned to competing against her own sex in the Cotillion Stakes over 8 1/2 furlongs at Parx on September 20 in which she was expected to be matched against Stopchargingmaria the winner of the Alabama Stakes and the CCA Oaks. The race lost some of its interest when Stopchargingmaria was scratched. Napravnik tracked the leaders Jojo Warrior and Cassatt before sending the 1/2 favorite into the lead approaching the final furlong. Untapable held off the late challenge of Sweet Reason and won by a length in a time of 1:42.30. Untapable took on older fillies and mares for the first time in the Breeders' Cup Distaff at Santa Anita on October 31 and started 8/5 favorite. Her biggest danger appeared to be the five-time Grade I winner Close Hatches while her other rivals included Belle Gallantey (Beldame Stakes), Iotapa (Vanity Handicap) and Don't Tell Sophia (Spinster Stakes). Forced to race on the outside she made rapid progress on the final turn before taking the lead from Iotapa entering the straight. She stayed on strongly to win by one and a quarter lengths from Don't Tell Sophia, who finished a nose in front of Iotapa. Asmussen said "I can't say enough about her and how proud I am of her. She's an amazing mare to put us on this stage and to perform like she did. Rosie and she are a great combination and they have had a tremendous season. Today, definitely makes her a champion and that's enough said. She's had a great year and she's a great filly." After the win, Napravnik announced that she was seven weeks pregnant and would be taking a "retirement" of "indefinite" duration.

=== 2015: four-year-old season ===
On January 17, 2015, Untapable won the Eclipse Award for American Champion Three-Year-Old Filly by a unanimous vote.

Rebounding from her March 14, 2015 debut loss in the Azeri Stakes, Untapable took the Grade I Apple Blossom Handicap on April 10. The winner of the Azeri, Gold Metal Dancer, placed. For the rest of the year Untapable ran consistently without recovering her best form and posted a string of placed efforts in major distaff races. She finished second to Wedding Toast in the Ogden Phipps Stakes, second to Stopchargingmaria in the Shuvee Handicap, third to Sheer Drama in the Personal Ensign Stakes and second to Got Lucky in the Spinster Stakes. It was expected that she would attempt to defend her Breeders' Cup Distaff title but was scratched three days before the race after she was found to be running an abnormally high temperature.

=== 2016: five-year-old season ===
Untapable made her seasonal debut in the Azeri Stakes for the second year in succession and as in 2015 she was beaten at odds-on, going down by a neck to Call Pat. She failed to recover her form in her two remaining races, despite starting odds-on on both occasions: she finished fourth in the Apple Blossom Handicap in April and fourth in the Grade III Fleur de Lis Handicap on 18 June at Churchill Downs. On June 19, 2016, it was announced Untapable had been retired from racing.

=== Retirement and Breeding ===
Foals – In 2018, she had a colt by Frankel. She was bred to Gun Runner for a 2019 foal.

In 2022, she carried an aborted foal by Gun Runner. In 2023, she had a colt by Gun Runner. In 2024, she was bred to Gun Runner.

== Pedigree ==
Pedigree of Untapable, bay filly, 2011
Sire Tapit (USA) 2001	Pulpit (USA); 1994	A.P. Indy	Seattle Slew
Sire Tapit (USA) 2001	Pulpit (USA); 1994	A.P. Indy	Weekend Surprise
Sire Tapit (USA) 2001	Pulpit (USA); 1994	Preach	Mr. Prospector
Sire Tapit (USA) 2001	Pulpit (USA); 1994	Preach	Narrate
Sire Tapit (USA) 2001	Tap Your Heels (USA); 1996	Unbridled	Fappiano
Sire Tapit (USA) 2001	Tap Your Heels (USA); 1996	Unbridled	Gana Facil
Sire Tapit (USA) 2001	Tap Your Heels (USA); 1996	Ruby Slippers	Nijinsky II
Sire Tapit (USA) 2001	Tap Your Heels (USA); 1996	Ruby Slippers	Moon Glitter
Dam Fun House (USA) 1999	Prized (USA); 1986	Kris S	Roberto
Dam Fun House (USA) 1999	Prized (USA); 1986	Kris S	Sharp Queen
Dam Fun House (USA) 1999	Prized (USA); 1986	My Turbulent Miss	My Dad George
Dam Fun House (USA) 1999	Prized (USA); 1986	My Turbulent Miss	Turbulent Miss
Dam Fun House (USA) 1999	Bistra (USA); 1986	Classic Go Go	Pago Pago
Dam Fun House (USA) 1999	Bistra (USA); 1986	Classic Go Go	Classic Perfection
Dam Fun House (USA) 1999	Bistra (USA); 1986	Carol's Christmas	Whitesburg
Dam Fun House (USA) 1999	Bistra (USA); 1986	Carol's Christmas	Light Verse (Family: 8-d)
