= Tacitus (horse) =

American Thoroughbred racehorse

- Breed: Thoroughbred
- Sire: Tapit
- Grandsire: Pulpit
- Dam: Close Hatches
- Damsire: First Defence
- Sex: Stallion
- Foaled: February 21, 2016
- Country: USA
- Color: Gray
- Breeder: Juddmonte Farms
- Owner: Juddmonte Farms
- Trainer: William I. Mott
- Jockey: Jose L. Ortiz
- Record: 17:4-4-3
- Earnings: $3,767,350

Major wins
- Tampa Bay Derby (2019); Wood Memorial Stakes (2019); Suburban Stakes (2020)

Tacitus (foaled February 21, 2016) is an American Thoroughbred racehorse and the winner of the Suburban Stakes, Wood Memorial, and Tampa Bay Derby. He also finished second in the Belmont Stakes and Travers Stakes, and came third in the Kentucky Derby.

== Racing career ==
=== 2018: 2-year-old season ===
Tacitus' first race was a maiden special weight on October 4 at Belmont Park, where he placed 4th.

He captured his first win on November 10, 2018, in another maiden special weight at Aqueduct Racetrack.

=== 2019: 3-year-old season ===
Tacitus picked up his first graded win by winning the Tampa Bay Derby on March 9. He then won the Wood Memorial Stakes on April 6, a top Kentucky Derby prep.

His wins in the Tampa Bay Derby and the Wood Memorial Stakes helped Tacitus gain points in the 2019 Road to the Kentucky Derby and gained him a spot in the 2019 Kentucky Derby.

In the 2019 Kentucky Derby, Tacitus crossed the finish line fourth but placed 3rd after the disqualification of the first-place finisher Maximum Security.

Tacitus then raced in the 2019 Belmont Stakes where he finished 2nd.

Tacitus finished out his three-year-old season by coming second in the Jim Dandy Stakes and Travers Stakes, and third in the Jockey Club Gold Cup.

=== 2020: 4-year-old season ===
Tacitus started his four-year-old season with a fifth-place finish in the inaugural 20 million Saudi Cup, the world's richest horse race.

He then came fourth in the Oaklawn Handicap, before he brought it all together by romping to win the Suburban Stakes by eight lengths in July.

His next start was the Woodward Stakes where he finished second, before closing strongly to finish fourth in the Breeders' Cup Classic.

=== 2021: Five-year-old season ===
Tacitus started the season in the Saudi Cup again. He faced the Breeders' Cup Dirt Mile and Pegasus World Cup winner Knicks Go, and the Malibu Stakes winner Charlatan who had crossed the finish line first in all five starts. Tacitus finished seventh in the race, while the British-trained Mishriff won over the second-place finisher Charlatan.

== Pedigree ==
Pedigree of Tacitus (USA), 2016
| Sire Tapit (USA) 2001 | Pulpit (USA); 1994 | A.P. Indy | Seattle Slew |
| Sire Tapit (USA) 2001 | Pulpit (USA); 1994 | A.P. Indy | Weekend Surprise |
| Sire Tapit (USA) 2001 | Pulpit (USA); 1994 | Preach | Mr. Prospector |
| Sire Tapit (USA) 2001 | Pulpit (USA); 1994 | Preach | Narrate |
| Sire Tapit (USA) 2001 | Tap Your Heels (USA); 1996 | Unbridled | Fappiano |
| Sire Tapit (USA) 2001 | Tap Your Heels (USA); 1996 | Unbridled | Gana Facil |
| Sire Tapit (USA) 2001 | Tap Your Heels (USA); 1996 | Ruby Slippers | Nijinsky |
| Sire Tapit (USA) 2001 | Tap Your Heels (USA); 1996 | Ruby Slippers | Moon Glitter |
| Dam Close Hatches (USA) 2010 | First Defense (USA); 2004 | Unbridled's Song | Unbridled |
| Dam Close Hatches (USA) 2010 | First Defense (USA); 2004 | Unbridled's Song | Trolley Song |
| Dam Close Hatches (USA) 2010 | First Defense (USA); 2004 | Honest Lady | Seattle Slew |
| Dam Close Hatches (USA) 2010 | First Defense (USA); 2004 | Honest Lady | Toussaud |
| Dam Close Hatches (USA) 2010 | Rising Tornado (USA); 2005 | Storm Cat | Storm Bird |
| Dam Close Hatches (USA) 2010 | Rising Tornado (USA); 2005 | Storm Cat | Terlingua |
| Dam Close Hatches (USA) 2010 | Rising Tornado (USA); 2005 | Silver Star | Zafonic |
| Dam Close Hatches (USA) 2010 | Rising Tornado (USA); 2005 | Silver Star | Monroe |
