= Corinthian (horse) =

American-bred Thoroughbred racehorse

- Sire: Pulpit
- Grandsire: A.P. Indy
- Dam: Multiply
- Damsire: Easy Goer
- Sex: Stallion
- Foaled: 2003
- Country: United States
- Color: Chestnut
- Breeder: Gracefield Equine & Hargus Sexton
- Owner: Evcimen Stud Turkey
- Trainer: James A. Jerkens
- Record: 12: 6-1-2
- Earnings: US$1,267,273

Major wins
- Metropolitan Handicap (2007); Gulfstream Park Handicap (2007) Breeders' Cup wins: Breeders' Cup Dirt Mile (2007)

Corinthian (foaled March 7, 2003 in Kentucky) is an American Thoroughbred racehorse.

He was purchased at the Fasig-Tipton 2004 Saratoga yearling sale for $385,000 by the Centennial Farms racing partnership led by Donald V. Little Sr. of Ipswich, Massachusetts.

Trained by Jimmy Jerkens, Corinthian is best known for winning the 2007 Grade I Breeders' Cup Dirt Mile at Monmouth Park and the 2007 Metropolitan Handicap (Grade I) at Belmont Park.

== At stud ==
Following his Metropolitan 'Cap win, Corinthian was retired to stud duty at Gainesway Farm, near Lexington, Kentucky. On November 19, 2013, it was announced that Corinthian would be moved to Pin Oak Lane Farm in New Freedom, Pennsylvania and continue standing at stud there. On December 2, 2017, Prince Lucky, a Pennsylvania-bred son of Corinthian owned by Daniel W. McConnell Sr., won the Pennsylvania Nursery Stakes at Parx Racing. Prince Lucky went on to win the Gulfstream Park Handicap and Hal's Hope Stakes. Corinthian is also the sire of Smarty Jones Stakes winner Junebugred.

In July 2017, Corinthian was sold to Turkish interests to stand at Evicmen Harasi in Kemalpaşa in Turkey's İzmir Province.

== Pedigree ==
Pedigree of Corinthian, chestnut stallion, 2003
Sire Pulpit	A.P. Indy	Seattle Slew	Bold Reasoning
Sire Pulpit	A.P. Indy	Seattle Slew	My Charmer
Sire Pulpit	A.P. Indy	Weekend Surprise	Secretariat
Sire Pulpit	A.P. Indy	Weekend Surprise	Lassie Dear
Sire Pulpit	Preach	Mr. Prospector	Raise a Native
Sire Pulpit	Preach	Mr. Prospector	Gold Digger
Sire Pulpit	Preach	Narrate	Honest Pleasure
Sire Pulpit	Preach	Narrate	State
Dam Multiply	Easy Goer	Alydar	Raise a Native
Dam Multiply	Easy Goer	Alydar	Sweet Tooth
Dam Multiply	Easy Goer	Relaxing	Buckpasser
Dam Multiply	Easy Goer	Relaxing	Marking Time
Dam Multiply	Add	Spectacular Bid	Bold Bidder
Dam Multiply	Add	Spectacular Bid	Spectacular
Dam Multiply	Add	Number	Nijinsky
Dam Multiply	Add	Number	Special (family: 5-h)
