= Careless Jewel =

American-bred Thoroughbred racehorse

- Sire: Tapit
- Grandsire: Pulpit
- Dam: Sweet and Careless
- Damsire: Hennessy
- Sex: Filly
- Foaled: 2006
- Country: United States
- Colour: Gray
- Breeder: Gainesway Thoroughbreds Ltd. & Bill Andrade
- Owner: Donver Stables
- Trainer: Josie Carroll
- Record: 7: 5-0-1
- Earnings: US$1,013,346

Major wins
- Delaware Oaks (2009); Alabama Stakes (2009); Cotillion Handicap (2009)

Careless Jewel (foaled March 4, 2006 in Kentucky) is a Canadian Thoroughbred racehorse.

== Background ==
Careless Jewel is out of the mare Sweet and Careless, and was sired by Tapit, a son of Pulpit by A.P. Indy by Seattle Slew. Bred by Gainesway Thoroughbreds Ltd. & Bill Andrade, the filly was sold at the September 2007 Keeneland Yearling Sale for $40,000. She is owned by Verne Dubinsky of Alberta, Canada who races under the name Donver Stables, and is trained by Josie Carroll from a base at Woodbine Racetrack in Toronto.

== Racing career ==
Careless Jewel came to prominence on the racing scene in July when she won the Delaware Oaks by over 8 lengths. She followed that with an 11-length victory in the Grade I Alabama Stakes over ten furlongs. She earned her fifth straight victory in the Cotillion Handicap in late September.

Ridden by regular jockey Robert Landry, Careless Jewell was the 9-5 favorite going into the November 6, 2009, Breeders' Cup Ladies' Classic world championship. However, the filly was uncontrollable and charged to an almost ten length lead, exhausting herself by the turn for home and fading to finish last. She did not race again.

== After racing ==
Her first foal was by Street Cry (IRE) and in 2013, she became the first mare to check in foal to Bodemeister. She later had a colt by Tiznow (in 2015) and in 2017 foaled a filly by Pioneerof the Nile. Careless Jewel lives at Summer Wind Farm in Georgetown, Kentucky.
