= Tapizar =

American Thoroughbred racehorse

- Sire: Tapit
- Grandsire: Pulpit
- Dam: Winning Call
- Damsire: Deputy Minister
- Sex: Stallion
- Foaled: May 6, 2008
- Died: December 15, 2020 (aged 12)
- Country: United States
- Colour: Bay
- Breeder: Winchell Thoroughbreds LLC
- Owner: Winchell Thoroughbreds LLC
- Trainer: Steven M. Asmussen
- Record: 14: 6–1–1
- Earnings: $972,632

Major wins
- Sham Stakes (2011); San Fernando Stakes (2012); West Virginia Governor's Stakes (2012); Breeders' Cup Dirt Mile (2012)

Tapizar (May 6, 2008 – December 15, 2020) was an American Thoroughbred racehorse best known for his wins in the San Fernando Stakes and Breeders' Cup Dirt Mile.

== Background ==
Tapizar was a bay horse with a stripe on his head. His sire was Tapit, a champion sire who has sired four Belmont Stakes winners in Tonalist, Creator, Tapwrit and Essential Quality, as well as February Stakes winner Testa Matta. His dam was Winning Call, whose sire was the Sovereign and Eclipse Award winner Deputy Minister.

== Career ==
=== Two-year old season ===
Tapizar started four times at two, debuting in a maiden special weight race at Monmouth Park, where he finished third after having taken the lead at the half-mile pole. In his second start, he was set to run against future millionaires Pants on Fire and Mucho Macho Man, but stumbled badly at the start and unseated rider Elvis Trujillo. After finishing fourth in his third start, Tapizar romped to win by 10½ lengths.

=== Three-year old season ===
Tapizar made his three-year-old and stakes debut in the Grade 3 Sham Stakes at Santa Anita Park, which he won by 4½ lengths. The following month, however, he sustained a chipped knee when finishing fifth in the Grade 2 Robert B. Lewis Stakes, forcing him off the Kentucky Derby trail and keeping him away from the races for eight months. After winning his first start back by 2¼ lengths, Tapizar was sent to Churchill Downs to contest the Grade 1 Breeders' Cup Dirt Mile, where he finished fifth to Caleb's Posse.

=== Four-year old season ===
For his four-year-old season in 2012, Tapizar made his comeback in the Grade 2 San Fernando Stakes at Santa Anita Park, which he won by 3½ lengths. The win was followed by a fourth-place finish in the Grade 2 Strub Stakes and by a second-place finish in the Grade 2 Razorback Handicap. Sidelined for five months, Tapizar made a winning return in the listed West Virginia Governor's Stakes.

As a prep for his second attempt at the Breeders' Cup Dirt Mile, Tapizar ran in the Grade 2 Kelso Handicap. He finished sixth, beaten 20¾ lengths, after breaking slowly and being bumped by eventual winner Jersey Town and To Honor and Serve.

Sent to Santa Anita for the Breeders' Cup, where he faced Fed Biz and Shackleford, Tapizar won by 2¼ lengths after Shackleford stumbled badly at the start and Fed Biz tired after being hustled early.

Five days after his win, it was announced that Tapizar had been retired to stud and would stand the 2013 season at Gainesway Farm for $12,500 LFSN.

== Retirement and death ==
At stud, Tapizar sired the 2018 Grade 1 Kentucky Oaks winner and Horse of the Year finalist Monomoy Girl.

Tapizar was humanely euthanized at twelve-years-old on December 15, 2020, following a stall accident while in quarantine to ship to Japan, where he was scheduled to stand at Yushun Stallion Station.
