= Eskimo Kisses =

American thoroughbred racehorse

- Eskimo Kisses before the 2018 Kentucky Oaks
- Sire: To Honor and Serve
- Grandsire: Bernardini
- Dam: Silver Colors
- Damsire: Mr. Greeley
- Sex: Mare
- Foaled: 2015
- Country: USA
- Color: Chestnut
- Breeder: Gainesway Thoroughbreds Ltd.
- Owner: Gainesway Stable (Antony Beck), Harold Lerner LLC, Nehoc Stables, Magdalena Racing (Sherri McPeek)
- Trainer: Kenneth G. McPeek
- Record: 12:3-4-0
- Earnings: $711,102

Major wins
- Alabama Stakes (2018)

Eskimo Kisses (foaled February 26, 2015) is an American Thoroughbred racehorse who won the 2018 Alabama Stakes.

== Career ==
Eskimo Kisses was foaled on February 26, 2015. Eskimo's first race was on November 25, 2017, at Keeneland Racecourse, where she finished 2nd.

Eskimo won her first race on February 1, 2018, at Oaklawn Park. She followed that up with a 2nd win on February 22.

Eskimo's next and highest grade win came on August 18, 2018, when she won the 2018 Alabama Stakes.

== Pedigree ==
Pedigree of Eskimo Kisses (USA), Chestnut, 2015
Sire To Honor and Serve(USA) 2008	Bernardini (USA); 2003	A.P. Indy (USA)	Seattle Slew
Sire To Honor and Serve(USA) 2008	Bernardini (USA); 2003	A.P. Indy (USA)	Weekend Surprise
Sire To Honor and Serve(USA) 2008	Bernardini (USA); 2003	Cara Rafaela (USA)	Quiet American
Sire To Honor and Serve(USA) 2008	Bernardini (USA); 2003	Cara Rafaela (USA)	Oil Fable
Sire To Honor and Serve(USA) 2008	Pilfer (USA); 2001	Deputy Minister(CAN)	Vice Regent
Sire To Honor and Serve(USA) 2008	Pilfer (USA); 2001	Deputy Minister(CAN)	Mint Copy
Sire To Honor and Serve(USA) 2008	Pilfer (USA); 2001	Misty Hour(USA)	Miswaki
Sire To Honor and Serve(USA) 2008	Pilfer (USA); 2001	Misty Hour(USA)	Our Tina Marie
Dam Silver Colors(USA) 2007	Mr. Greeley (USA); 1992	Gone West (USA)	Mr. Prospector
Dam Silver Colors(USA) 2007	Mr. Greeley (USA); 1992	Gone West (USA)	Secrettame
Dam Silver Colors(USA) 2007	Mr. Greeley (USA); 1992	Long Legend (USA)	Reviewer
Dam Silver Colors(USA) 2007	Mr. Greeley (USA); 1992	Long Legend (USA)	Liang
Dam Silver Colors(USA) 2007	Winning Colors (USA); 1985	Caro (IRE)	Fortino
Dam Silver Colors(USA) 2007	Winning Colors (USA); 1985	Caro (IRE)	Chambord
Dam Silver Colors(USA) 2007	Winning Colors (USA); 1985	All Rainbows (USA)	Bold Hour
Dam Silver Colors(USA) 2007	Winning Colors (USA); 1985	All Rainbows (USA)	Miss Carmie
