= Tapit =

American Thoroughbred racehorse

- Sire: Pulpit
- Grandsire: A.P. Indy
- Dam: Tap Your Heels
- Damsire: Unbridled
- Sex: Stallion
- Foaled: February 27, 2001 (age 25)
- Country: United States
- Colour: Gray
- Breeder: Oldenburg Farms, LLC
- Owner: Winchell Thoroughbreds
- Trainer: Michael Dickinson
- Record: 6: 3–0–0
- Earnings: $557,300

Major wins
- Laurel Futurity Stakes (2003); Wood Memorial Stakes (2004)

Awards
- Leading sire in North America (2014, 2015, 2016)

Tapit (foaled February 27, 2001, in Kentucky) is an American Thoroughbred racehorse who won three of his six races, including the Wood Memorial Stakes, then a Grade I event. He was an immediate success after retiring to stud, becoming the leading freshman sire in North America of 2008 with Breeders' Cup winner Stardom Bound becoming his first Grade I winner. He was the leading sire in North America in 2014, setting an earnings record that he broke in 2015 and again in 2016. For the 2015 season, his stud fee was raised to $300,000, the highest in North America. In 2021, Essential Quality became his fourth Belmont Stakes winner (Tonalist, Creator and Tapwrit being the others), tying him for the all-time record of winners sired in this race with the great Lexington.

== Background ==
Tapit is a gray horse. He is heterozygous for the dominant gray gene, which he inherited via his dam, Tap Your Heels. As such, there is a 50-50 chance that any given foal sired by him on a non-gray mare will be gray. His base coat color before turning gray was chestnut.

Tapit was purchased as a yearling in 2002 for $625,000 by Verne Winchell, a prominent California owner, under the recommendation of his bloodstock advisor Dr. David Lambert. Winchell died soon afterwards and left the horse to his son, Ron. The manager of Winchell Thoroughbreds, David Fiske, placed the horse in the hands of trainer Michael Dickinson.

Tapit has been described as an attractive, well-balanced, elegant horse whose appearance reflects the Thoroughbred's Arabian ancestors. He stands 16 hands (64 inches, 163 cm) high.

== Racing career ==
Tapit raced twice at age two, winning both times. On October 19, he won a one-mile maiden special weight at Delaware Park by 7 3/4 lengths. He then won the Grade III Laurel Futurity Stakes on November 15 by five lengths, earning a Beyer Speed Figure of 98. Veteran sportswriter Andrew Beyer wrote, "No 2-year-old in America had looked more impressive."

His return to the racetrack was delayed due to lingering shin problems. He made his 3-year-old debut in the Florida Derby on March 13 and finished sixth in the Grade 1 race, but his poor finish was later explained by the discovery of a lung infection. He bounced back in April, coming from last to win the Grade I Wood Memorial Stakes by half a length over Master David. “I was dreading the race, because I knew he wasn’t fit,” trainer Michael Dickinson said. “He’s a very generous horse, and he has such a big heart. I felt I was putting him into battle unprepared. And if anything had happened I would have blamed myself. But the horse carried me through, and I’m indebted to him. He’s such a generous horse and we love him dearly.”

Tapit was the 6–1 third betting choice in the 2004 Kentucky Derby and finished ninth behind Smarty Jones. He was scheduled to race in the 2004 Belmont Stakes but was scratched due to a return of the lung infection. In his last race, the Sept. 6, 2004, Pennsylvania Derby, he finished ninth.

== Stud career ==
Tapit was retired to stud at Gainesway Farm in Lexington, Kentucky in 2005 for a stud fee of $15,000. His first foals were of racing age in 2008 and he made an immediate impact, making him the leading freshman sire that year. His first crop was led by champion 2-year-old filly Stardom Bound, winner of the 2008 Breeders' Cup Juvenile Fillies, and included 15 stakes winners overall.

His next few crops were not as strong but he was still third on the 2009 second-crop sire list (including 2009 Breeders' Cup Juvenile Fillies Turf winner Tapitsfly), and third on the 2010 third-crop sire list. In 2011, he was third on the general sire list. His leading performer, Hansen, won the Breeders' Cup Juvenile and was named champion two-year-old. Tapit finished fourth on the general sire list in 2012, and seventh in 2013.

In 2014 Tapit led the sire list for North America, setting an earnings record in the process. His top performers of 2014 were Untapable and Tonalist. Tonalist became Tapit's first American Classic winner when he won the 2014 Belmont Stakes; Untapable won the Kentucky Oaks and Breeders' Cup Distaff, and was named champion 3-year-old filly.

In 2015, Tapit led the sire list for the second time, breaking his own earnings record. Top performers that year included Tonalist and Frosted. In 2015, he also led North America by number of winners with 174. He was the leading sire in every "black-type" category tracked by Thoroughbred Daily News, with 23 Black-Type Winners, 47 Black-Type Horses (meaning that 47 of his foals finished first, second or third in qualifying stakes company), 16 Graded/Group Stakes Winners, 29 Graded Stakes Horses, five Grade I/Group 1 winners and 10 Grade/Group 1-placed horses.

In 2016, he once again headed the sire list, with top performers including Frosted and 2016 Belmont Stakes winner Creator. Two fillies sired by him dead-heated in the Grade I Spinaway Stakes, the two being Pretty City Dancer and Sweet Loretta. He also sired two Grade I winners on the turf, Ring Weekend and Time and Motion. David Firsk, the stallion manager of Winchell Stable, said, "The versatility he has and everything else, I mean, you could subtract his turf earnings from his total ... and he'd still be the leading sire. Turf runners are like a hobby for him."

In 2017, his son Tapwrit won the Belmont Stakes, marking the third time a son of Tapit had won the race in four years. His other leading performers included Cupid (Gold Cup at Santa Anita), Actress (Black-Eyed Susan), and Unique Bella (American Champion Female Sprint Horse, Las Virgenes, Santa Ysabel Stakes, La Brea Stakes).

With his record of siring winners, his stud fee steadily increased, from the original $15,000 to $80,000 in 2011, $125,000 in 2013, and to $150,000 in 2014. For the 2015 breeding season, his fee was doubled to $300,000, and in 2017 was the highest in the United States. In 2014, a single share in Tapit, providing a guaranteed breeding right for the rest of his career, was sold for $2.8 million. This made his total value an estimated $140 million.

Tapit has produced the most successful foals from mares that "nick" or complement the genetic strengths in his pedigree. Tapit is inbred to Nijinsky, a son of Northern Dancer, and many of his best offspring are out of mares who also carry Northern Dancer breeding, but via different lines. Frosted is an example of how Tapit crosses well on mares that carry the bloodlines of Seattle Slew.

=== Statistics ===
By Racing Year
Year	North American Rank	Winners	Black-Type Winners	Graded Stakes Winners	Chief Earner	Earnings^{†}
2008	#1 first-crop	24	3	2	Stardom Bound	$2,811,337
2009	28	70	11	4	Careless Jewel	$5,187,086
2010	12	111	12	5	Concord Point	$6,521,662
2011	3	121	13	7	Hansen	$9,229,483
2012	4	140	10	6	Tapizar	$9,305,068
2013	7	139	11	6	Joyful Victory	$9,184,624
2014	1	156	17	12	Untapable	$16,813,536
2015	1	175	23	16	Frosted	$18,397,691
2016	1	149	21	15	Frosted	$19,245,888
2017	5	152	19	11	Tapwrit	$12,909,191
2018	5	152	15	7	Unique Bella	$12,864,700
2019	3	147	26	13	Tacitus	$14,335,769
2020	2	113	14	11	Tacitus	$11,825,591

^{†} Prior to 2015, the Leading Sire Lists published by The Blood-Horse excluded earnings from Hong Kong and Japan due to the disparity in purses. Starting in 2015, earnings from Hong Kong and Japan are included on an adjusted basis.

=== Notable progeny ===
His major stakes winners include:

c = colt, f = filly, g = gelding

Foaled	Name	Sex	Major Wins
2006	Careless Jewel	f	Alabama Stakes, Cotillion Handicap
2006	Laragh	f	Hollywood Starlet Stakes
2006	Stardom Bound	f	Breeders' Cup Juvenile Fillies, Santa Anita Oaks, champion 2yo filly
2006	Testa Matta	c	Japan Dirt Derby, February Stakes
2007	Tapitsfly	f	Breeders' Cup Juvenile Fillies Turf
2008	Joyful Victory	f	Santa Margarita Stakes
2008	Tapizar	c	Breeders' Cup Dirt Mile
2008	Tell a Kelly	f	Del Mar Debutante Stakes
2008	Zazu	f	Lady's Secret Stakes, Las Virgenes Stakes
2009	Dance Card	f	Gazelle Stakes
2009	Hansen	c	Breeders' Cup Juvenile, champion 2yo colt
2011	Constitution	c	Florida Derby, Donn Handicap
2011	Ring Weekend	g	Frank E. Kilroe Mile Stakes
2011	Tonalist	c	Belmont Stakes, Jockey Club Gold Cup (twice), Cigar Mile Handicap
2011	Untapable	f	Breeders' Cup Distaff, Kentucky Oaks, Mother Goose Stakes, Apple Blossom, Cotillion stakes champion 3yo filly
2012	Frosted	c	Wood Memorial, Metropolitan Handicap, Whitney Stakes
2013	Creator	c	Arkansas Derby, Belmont Stakes
2013	Cupid	c	Gold Cup at Santa Anita
2013	Time and Motion	f	Queen Elizabeth II Challenge Cup Stakes
2014	Dream Dancing	f	Del Mar Oaks
2014	Pretty City Dancer	f	Spinaway Stakes
2014	Sweet Loretta	f	Spinaway Stakes
2014	Tapwrit	c	Belmont Stakes
2014	Unique Bella	f	La Brea Stakes, Beholder Mile, Clement L Hirsch Stakes, champion female sprinter in 2017, champion older female in 2018
2016	Chasing Yesterday	f	Starlet Stakes
2016	Valiance	f	Spinster Stakes
2018	Essential Quality	c	Breeders' Cup Juvenile, champion 2yo colt, Bluegrass Stakes, Belmont Stakes, Travers Stakes
2018	Flightline	c	Malibu Stakes, Metropolitan Handicap, Pacific Classic Stakes, Breeders' Cup Classic, 2022 Horse of the Year, 2022 Champion Older Male
2018	Pauline's Pearl	f	La Troienne Stakes
2018	Proxy	c	Clark Stakes
2020	Arthur's Ride	c	Whitney Stakes
2020	Scylla	f	Breeders' Cup Distaff
2020	Tapit Trice	c	Blue Grass Stakes
2022	Sandman	c	Arkansas Derby

== Pedigree ==
Tapit is by Pulpit, who stood at Claiborne Farm. Pulpit is by A.P. Indy, the 1992 Horse of the Year and an outstanding sire. A.P. Indy is by Triple Crown winner Seattle Slew, and out of Weekend Surprise by Secretariat. Pulpit's female family traces back to one of Claiborne's foundation mares, Knight's Daughter, the dam of Round Table.

Tapit's dam is Tap Your Heels, a stakes-winning mare by Unbridled. Her dam, Ruby Slippers, also produced champion sprinter Rubiano, and is the third dam of champion Summer Bird. Tapit's third dam, Moon Glitter, was a stakes-winning full sister to important sire Relaunch. Tap Your Heels is inbred to In Reality, a descendant of Man o' War.

Pedigree of Tapit, gray or roan stallion, 2001
Sire Pulpit (USA) 1994	A.P. Indy (USA); 1989	Seattle Slew	Bold Reasoning
Sire Pulpit (USA) 1994	A.P. Indy (USA); 1989	Seattle Slew	My Charmer
Sire Pulpit (USA) 1994	A.P. Indy (USA); 1989	Weekend Surprise	Secretariat
Sire Pulpit (USA) 1994	A.P. Indy (USA); 1989	Weekend Surprise	Lassie Dear
Sire Pulpit (USA) 1994	Preach (USA); 1989	Mr Prospector*	Raise a Native
Sire Pulpit (USA) 1994	Preach (USA); 1989	Mr Prospector*	Gold Digger
Sire Pulpit (USA) 1994	Preach (USA); 1989	Narrate	Honest Pleasure
Sire Pulpit (USA) 1994	Preach (USA); 1989	Narrate	State
Dam Tap Your Heels (USA) 1996	Unbridled (USA); 1987	Fappiano	Mr Prospector*
Dam Tap Your Heels (USA) 1996	Unbridled (USA); 1987	Fappiano	Killaloe
Dam Tap Your Heels (USA) 1996	Unbridled (USA); 1987	Gana Facil	Le Fabuleux
Dam Tap Your Heels (USA) 1996	Unbridled (USA); 1987	Gana Facil	Charedi
Dam Tap Your Heels (USA) 1996	Ruby Slippers (USA); 1982	Nijinsky II	Northern Dancer
Dam Tap Your Heels (USA) 1996	Ruby Slippers (USA); 1982	Nijinsky II	Flaming Page
Dam Tap Your Heels (USA) 1996	Ruby Slippers (USA); 1982	Moon Glitter	In Reality
Dam Tap Your Heels (USA) 1996	Ruby Slippers (USA); 1982	Moon Glitter	Foggy Note

- Tapit is inbred 3s × 4d to Mr Prospector, meaning he appears in the 3rd generation on the sire side and 4th generation on the dam side of his pedigree.

He has seven strains tracing to the influential broodmare La Troienne.
