= A.P. Indy =

American-bred Thoroughbred racehorse

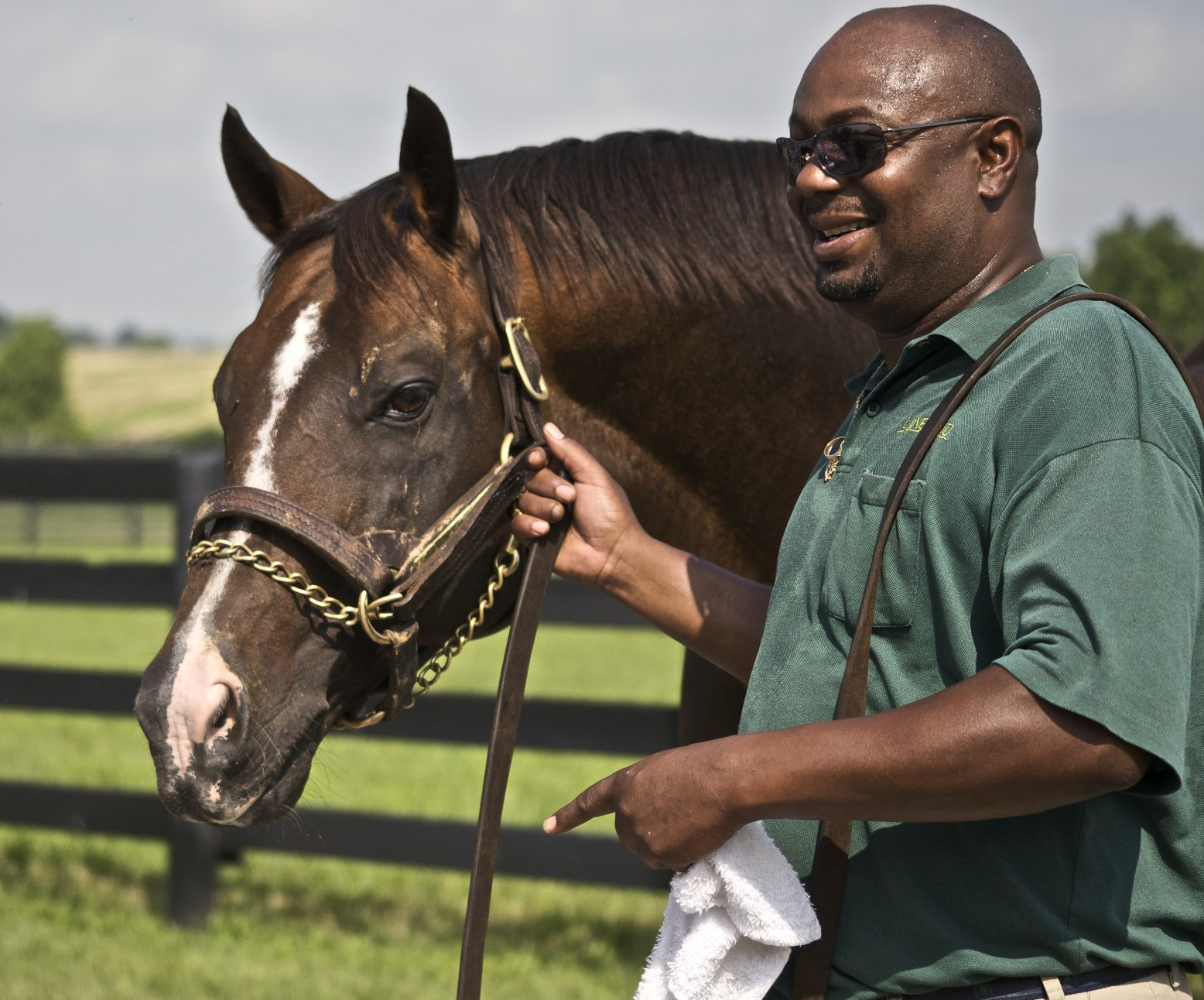
- A.P. Indy in 2010
- Sire: Seattle Slew
- Grandsire: Bold Reasoning
- Dam: Weekend Surprise
- Damsire: Secretariat
- Sex: Stallion
- Foaled: March 31, 1989; Versailles, Kentucky, U.S.
- Died: February 21, 2020 (aged 30); Versailles, Kentucky, U.S.
- Country: United States
- Colour: Dark Bay or Brown
- Breeder: William Farish III; William S. Kilroy
- Owner: Tomonori Tsurumaki (1990); Farish, Goodman, Kilroy and Tsurumaki (1992)
- Trainer: Neil Drysdale
- Record: 11: 8-0-1
- Earnings: $2,979,815

Major wins
- Hollywood Futurity (1991); San Rafael Stakes (1992); Santa Anita Derby (1992); Peter Pan Stakes (1992) U.S. Triple Crown wins: Belmont Stakes (1992) Breeders' Cup wins: Breeders' Cup Classic (1992)

Awards
- U.S. Champion 3-Yr-Old Colt (1992); United States Horse of the Year (1992); Leading sire in North America (2003, 2006); Leading broodmare sire in North America (2015)

Honours
- United States Racing Hall of Fame (2000); A. P. Indy Stakes at Keeneland (1997–2002)
- Last updated on 17 October 2022

A.P. Indy (March 31, 1989 – February 21, 2020) was an American Thoroughbred racehorse who won the Belmont Stakes and Breeders' Cup Classic on his way to American Horse of the Year honors in 1992. His time in the Belmont Stakes tied Easy Goer for the second-fastest running in the history of the race, behind his damsire Secretariat.

A.P. Indy subsequently became a "breed-shaping sire", leading the North American sire list twice and establishing a sire line that has produced multiple American Classic winners. A.P Indy lived most of his life at Lane's End Farm, where he was born and raised, and stood his entire stud career. For many years, he was the oldest living winner of the Breeders' Cup Classic, the oldest living winner of the Belmont Stakes, and the oldest living winner of a Triple Crown race.

A.P. Indy is part of the only three-generation sequence of Belmont Stakes winners in American racing history. He is by 1977 winner Seattle Slew and is the sire of 2007 winner Rags to Riches.

He was inducted into the Hall of Fame in 2000. He has been called "the fantasy of every Thoroughbred industry participant, from sale-topper yearling, to champion runner, to game-changing stallion to sire of sires." Bill Farish, son of Lane's End founder William Farish, said, "Words really can't put into perspective what he's meant to us. How many sale toppers are yearlings that end up being that good where they are Horse of the Year and then go on and be two-time champion sire and then have the long term influence that he has had and will continue to have? It's pretty amazing."

== Background ==
A.P. Indy was a dark bay or brown horse with a narrow white blaze and a white sock on the right hind leg. He was bred in Kentucky by William Farish III and William Kilroy, and was foaled on March 31, 1989, at Lane's End Farm in Versailles, Kentucky. He was sired by Triple Crown-winner Seattle Slew. His dam Weekend Surprise was a multiple graded stakes winner whose first foal, Summer Squall, won the 1990 Preakness Stakes. Weekend Surprise was from a distinguished female family and her sire was Triple Crown winner Secretariat. Weekend Surprise was named the 1992 Kentucky Broodmare of the Year.

Combined with an elite pedigree, A.P. Indy was a near perfect physical specimen. He became the top-priced yearling of 1990 at $2.9 million. His new owner was Tomonori Tsurumaki, who named the colt in honor of his recently opened Nippon Autopolis, where Tsurumaki hoped to host a Formula One (Indy Car) event. In July 1992, A.P. Indy's breeders Farish and Kilroy bought back an interest in the colt.

A.P. Indy was born a ridgling, meaning he had one undescended testicle. As this caused him discomfort when he started his racing career, he would normally have been gelded. But because of his breeding potential, surgery was instead performed to remove the undescended testicle. His fertility was not affected by the condition.

At maturity, he reached 16 hands (64 inches, 163 cm) high. When racing, his low-headed, efficient gait was reminiscent of his broodmare sire, Secretariat. His one weakness was having rather "shelly" feet, meaning he was difficult to shoe. As a stallion, he developed a "dipped topline" (a mostly cosmetic issue not to be confused with a sway-back) that is often found in descendants of Seattle Slew. He had a white-rimmed left eye that could give him a rather wild appearance.

== Racing career ==
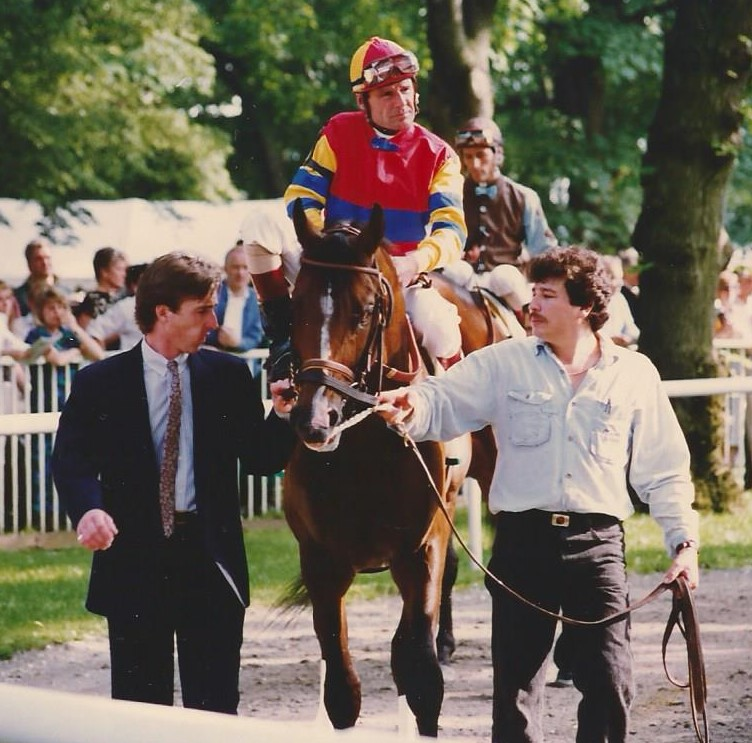
A.P. Indy before 1992 Belmont

Trained by Hall of Famer Neil Drysdale, A.P. Indy won three of four starts in 1991, including the Grade I Hollywood Futurity. On the Experimental Free Handicap, he was co-ranked the third best two-year-old of 1991 at 124 pounds, six pounds below the juvenile champion Arazi and one pound below Bertrando.

He started his three-year-old campaign in 1992 with wins in the San Rafael Stakes and Santa Anita Derby. He was the second favorite on the morning line for the 1992 Kentucky Derby, but had to be scratched on the morning of the race due to a bone bruise. "He galloped very well", Drysdale said of a routine workout the day before. But in early afternoon, he came out of the stall and the trouble was discovered. "He just went like this", Drysdale said, lunging to one side to describe A.P. Indy's lameness.

Drysdale eventually used a fiberglass patch to repair a small, almost invisible crack in A.P. Indy's hoof. A.P Indy missed the Preakness as a result, then prepped for the Belmont in the Peter Pan Stakes. The field was no match for A.P. Indy, who won by 5 1/2 lengths.

A.P. Indy before the 1992 Belmont Stakes

On June 6, he entered the Belmont Stakes against a field of eleven that included Preakness Stakes winner, Pine Bluff. Having drawn the number 1 post, Drysdale was concerned was getting trapped on the rail so he talked to jockey Eddie Delahoussaye about working toward the outside. Also of concern were heavy rains that fell for most of the day before the race and into the night, making the track condition "muddy" for the first eight races of the undercard. And above all, Drysdale worried about A.P. Indy's hoof. "The patch? I think about it every day. I look at it every day."

The sun finally came out and the track was upgraded to "good" for the Belmont Stakes. As expected, A.P. Indy broke behind the leaders and tracked the pace in fourth for the first mile. Agincourt and Casual Lies set a brisk pace, followed by Pine Bluff. As they rounded the turn, Pine Bluff moved to the lead while A.P. Indy circled wide to close the gap. The two dueled down the stretch with A.P. Indy finally drawing clear in deep stretch. My Memoir then started closing quickly, but A.P. Indy had enough in reserve and prevailed by 3/4 lengths, with My Memoir beating Pine Bluff by a neck for second. "I thought I was the winner turning for home", said My Memoirs' jockey, Jerry Bailey. "Eddie had just enough horse and he rated him really well. He deserves a lot of credit. He sat chilly and knew he had enough."

Despite the track being good instead of fast, A.P. Indy raced the mile and a half in 2:26 flat, matching the second-fastest time for the Belmont Stakes set in 1989 by Easy Goer (although his time was subsequently adjusted to 2:26.13). He was two seconds off the track record set in 1973 by his grandsire Secretariat.

A.P. Indy was given the summer off to allow his hoof to completely heal, then returned on September 13 with a dull performance in the Molson Export Million, finishing fifth. On October 10, he finished third in the Jockey Club Gold Cup after stumbling at the start and tearing off his right front shoe. "There wasn't much foot left", Drysdale recalled later. "Fortunately, acrylic had just been developed, and [farrier] Joey Carroll rebuilt his foot that night." Finishing ahead of him were Pleasant Tap, who was having an outstanding year, and Strike the Gold, the previous year's Kentucky Derby winner.

The Breeders' Cup that year was held on October 31 at Gulfstream Park. There was a full field of fourteen horses for the Classic, twelve of whom had won Group 1 or Grade I races. A.P. Indy and Pleasant Tap were the two betting favorites, going off at 2-1 and 5-2 respectively. A.P. Indy broke well but soon dropped back to eighth off a fast opening pace set by Thunder Rumble. He remained on the rail at the back of the pack until the final turn when he split between horses to find running room. Under a hand ride, he drew clear to win by 2 lengths over Pleasant Tap.

He was voted the Eclipse Awards for American Horse of the Year and Champion three-year-old colt. In his career, he made 11 starts, winning eight and showing once, earning a total of $2,979,815.

In 2000, A.P. Indy was inducted into the National Museum of Racing and Hall of Fame at the same time as Drysdale, his trainer.

== Stud record ==
A.P. Indy was retired to stud at Lane's End Farm in 1993 with an initial stud fee of $50,000. Farish explained: "We wanted to keep him in training. He's very sound and such a brilliant horse, but it would be taking a tremendous risk with a great sire prospect. So many of our top horses have been retired to Europe or Japan that we need a horse like this to stand in the U.S. Everyone involved concluded that this was the right thing to do."

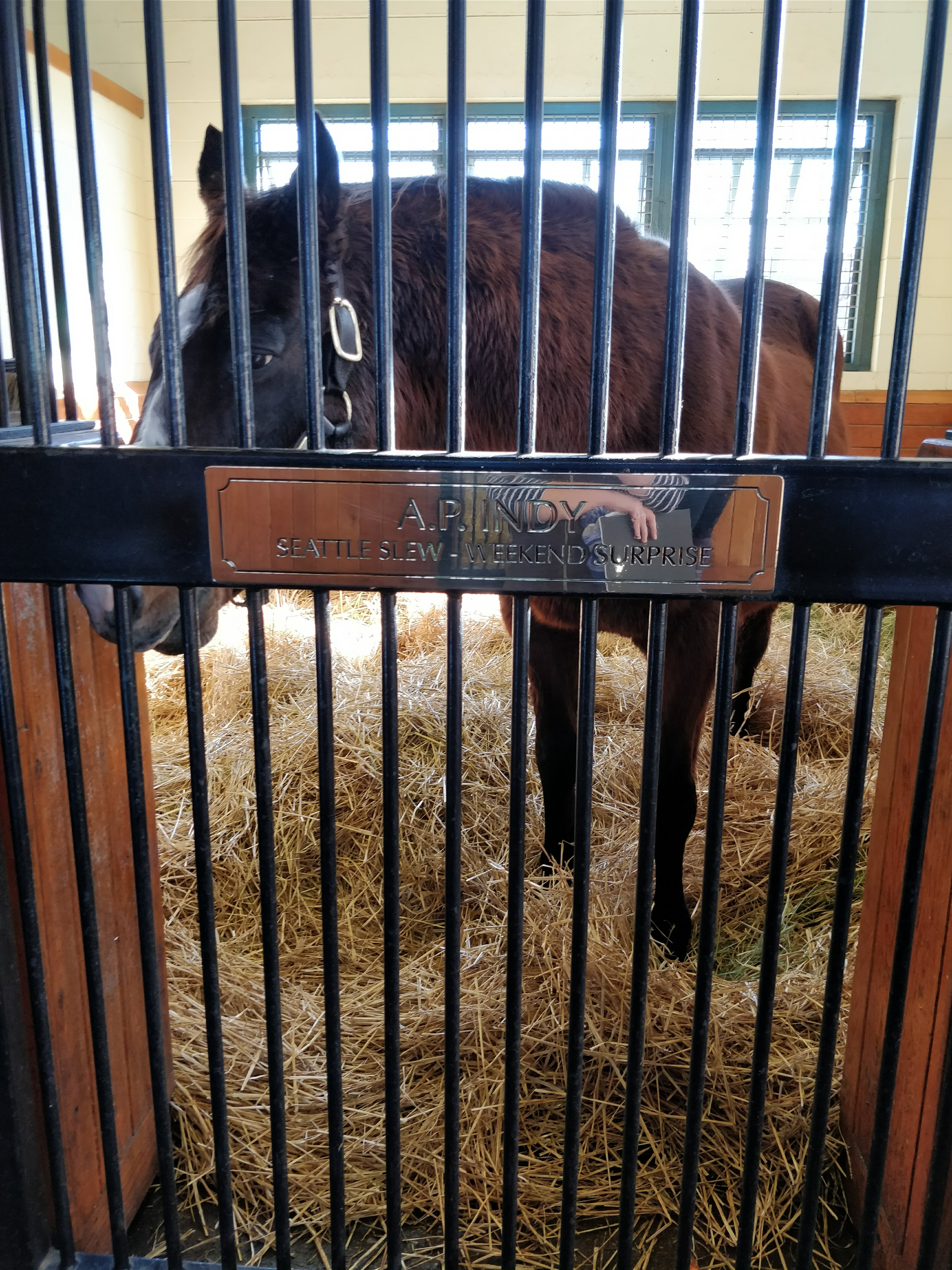
A.P. Indy in January 2017 after he was pensioned

A.P. Indy went on to become a "breed-shaping" sire. For much of his career, he stood for $300,000. He was the leading sire in North America for 2003 and 2006, and was among the top 10 for 10 consecutive years. He sired 88 graded stakes winners and 12 champions. His 12.5% stakes winners to foals ratio is the best among contemporary American stallions of the "big book era".

A.P. Indy was also an important broodmare sire, leading the North American list in 2015. His daughters have produced Royal Delta, Kentucky Derby winner Super Saver, Preakness Stakes winner Cloud Computing, Kentucky Oaks winner Plum Pretty, champion Wait A While and Grade 1 stakes winners Bluegrass Cat and Any Given Saturday.

A.P. Indy was considered to have stamina in the normally speed-oriented stallion ranks of North America. This means his progeny are highly prized by those who are looking for racehorses who can compete in top races at classic distances. In 2008, A.P. Indy became the 208th chef-de-race with an Intermediate/Classic designation.

A.P. Indy sired his last foals in 2010, when only 36 of 80 mares he bred conceived. Of these, two would become grade 1 winners: Honor Code and Got Lucky, whose name refers to the multiple tries it took her dam to get in foal. He was retired from stud duty on April 8, 2011, upon failing to produce a confirmed live foal in the 25 mares he covered. A.P. Indy remained in his old stall, with sons Mineshaft in the stall across the aisle from him and Honor Code in the stall next to him.

A.P. Indy lived to age 31, (Note: All thoroughbreds in the Northern Hemisphere have an official birthday of January 1 for the purposes of determining their age.) an advanced age for a horse. From June 2017 until his death, he had been the oldest living winner of the Belmont Stakes and the oldest living Classic winner overall. He was also the oldest living winner of the Breeders' Cup Classic. He died on February 21, 2020, due to the infirmities of old age.

=== Major stakes winners ===
Some of his leading progeny include (fillies in italics, champions in bold):

- Pulpit (1994) – Blue Grass Stakes
- Tomisue's Delight (1994) – Ruffian Handicap, Personal Ensign Handicap
- Golden Missile (1995) – Pimlico Special
- Old Trieste (1995)- Del Mar Breeders' Cup Handicap, Californian Stakes
- Stephen Got Even (1996) – Donn Handicap
- Symboli Indy (1996) – NHK Mile Cup
- Secret Status (1997) – Kentucky Oaks, Mother Goose Stakes
- Aptitude (1997) – Jockey Club Gold Cup
- Mineshaft (1999) – (Jockey Club Gold Cup), **2003 Horse of the Year and champion older horse**
- Tempera (1999) – Breeders' Cup Juvenile Fillies, **champion 2-year-old filly**
- Jiljab (1999) – Coaching Club American Oaks
- Jump Start (1999)- Saratoga Special Stakes
- Congrats (2000) – San Pasqual Handicap
- Suave (2001) – Multiple graded stakes winner
- Friend's Lake (2001) – Florida Derby,
- Bernardini (2003) – 2006 Preakness Stakes, **champion 3-year-old colt**
- Rags to Riches (2004) (2007 Belmont Stakes), **champion 3-year-old filly**
- Marchfield (2004) – in Canada, **champion older horse**
- Serenading (2004) – in Canada, **champion older mare**
- Eldaafer (2005) – Brooklyn Handicap, Breeders' Cup Marathon
- Music Note (2005) – Coaching Club American Oaks, Ballerina Handicap
- Eye of the Leopard (2006) – Queen's Plate
- Love and Pride (2008) – Personal Ensign Handicap, Zenyatta Stakes
- Take Charge Indy (2009) – Florida Derby, Alysheba Stakes
- Dreaming of Julia (2010) – Frizette Stakes, Gulfstream Oaks
- Long River (2010) – Al Maktoum Challenge Race 3 (UAE-G1)
- Commissioner (2011) – Hawthorne Gold Cup, Pimlico Special, second in 2014 Belmont Stakes
- Got Lucky (2011) – Spinster Stakes, Molly Pitcher Stakes
- Honor Code (2011) – Metropolitan Handicap, Whitney Handicap, **Champion Older Dirt Horse**

=== Sire line ===
A.P. Indy has numerous sons and grandsons who stand (or stood) in North America. Those with notable offspring include:

- Pulpit (died 2012):
  - Tapit – Wood Memorial, leading sire in North America for 2014, 2015 and 2016
    - Untapable (Kentucky Oaks, Breeders' Cup Distaff, champion 3-year-old filly)
      - Stardom Bound(2008 Breeders' Cup Juvenile Fillies, champion juvenile filly)
    - Hansen (2011 Breeders' Cup Juvenile, champion juvenile)
    - Tapitsfly (2012 Just a Game Stakes, First Lady Stakes)
    - Tonalist (2014 Belmont Stakes, 2014, 2015 Jockey Club Gold Cup)
      - Country Grammer (2021 Hollywood Gold Cup Stakes)
    - Flightline (2022 Breeders' Cup Classic, Pacific Classic Stakes)
    - Frosted (2016 Metropolitan Handicap, Whitney Handicap)
    - Creator (2016 Belmont Stakes, Arkansas Derby)
    - Tapwrit (2017 Belmont Stakes, Tampa Bay Derby)
    - Cupid (2017 Gold Cup)
    - Constitution (2014 Florida Derby, 2015 Donn Handicap)
      - Tiz the Law (2020 Belmont Stakes, Florida Derby)
      - Americanrevolution (2021 Cigar Mile Handicap)
    - Testa Matta (2012 February Stakes, 2009 Japan Dirt Derby)
    - Tapizar (2012 Breeders' Cup Dirt Mile)
      - Monomoy Girl (2018 Kentucky Oaks, Breeders' Cup Distaff)
    - Concord Point (2010 West Virginia Derby)
      - American Gal (2018 Humana Distaff Stakes, 2017 Test Stakes)
  - Lucky Pulpit (Stakes winner)
    - California Chrome (2014 Kentucky Derby, Preakness Stakes, 2016 Dubai World Cup)
  - Sky Mesa (2002 Hopeful Stakes)
    - General Quarters (2009 Blue Grass Stakes)
    - Perfect Alibi (2019 Spinaway Stakes)
  - Stroll (2004 Turf Classic Stakes)
    - Wet Your Whistle (2019 Highlander Stakes)
- Bernardini: Alpha, Stay Thirsty, To Honor and Serve, Cavorting, Art Collector, Imperative, Rachel's Valentina, Boban (AUS), Dame Dorothy, Angela Renee
  - To Honor and Serve (2011 Cigar Mile, 2012 Woodward Stakes)
    - Eskimo Kisses (Alabama Stakes)
  - Stay Thirsty (2011 Travers Stakes, 2012 Cigar Mile)
    - Mind Control (2019 H. Allen Jerkens Stakes, 2018 Hopeful Stakes)
  - Algorithms (2012 Holy Bull Stakes)
    - Math Wizard (2019 Pennsylvania Derby)
- Malibu Moon: Life at Ten, Gormley, Malibu Mint, Declan's Moon, Carina Mia, Devil May Care, Ransom the Moon, Magnum Moon (15 G1 winners)
  - Orb (2013 Kentucky Derby)
    - Sippican Harbor (2018 Spinaway Stakes)
- Honor Code: Max Player, Honor A.P., Maracuja
- Mineshaft: Effinex, It's Tricky, Fly Down, Cool Coal Man, Discreetly Mine, Nates Mineshaft
  - Dialed In (Florida Derby)
    - Gunnevera (Fountain of Youth Stakes, Saratoga Special Stakes)
    - Super Stock (Arkansas Derby)
    - Get Her Number American Pharoah Stakes
- Flatter: West Coast, Flat Out, Taris, Paola Queen, Search Results
- Jump Start: Prayer for Relief, Rail Trip, Pants on Fire, Miss Behaviour
- Majestic Warrior: Princess of Sylmar, Best Warrior (Japanese Gr.I winner)
- Congrats: Polar River, Haveyougoneaway, Turbulent Descent, Emma's Encore, Wickedly Perfect
- Old Trieste: Silver Train, Barcola
  - Sinister Minister (2006 Blue Grass Stakes)
    - T O Keynes (2021 Champions Cup)
- Friesan Fire: Army Mule
- Judpot: Along Came Polly (South African champion)
- Stephen Got Even:
  - Stevie Wonderboy (Breeders' Cup Juvenile, American Champion Two-Year-Old Male)
  - I Want Revenge (CashCall Futurity, Wood Memorial)
  - First Dude (2011 Hollywood Gold Cup)
    - Shamrock Rose (2018 Breeders' Cup Filly & Mare Sprint, champion female sprinter)

==== As a broodmare sire ====
- Tapitsfly (Just a Game Stakes, First Lady Stakes, Breeders' Cup Juvenile Fillies Turf) produced:
  - Gran Alegria (6 Grade I wins)
- Dreaming of Julia (Frizette Stakes, Gulfstream Oaks) produced:
  - Malathaat (Kentucky Oaks, Alabama Stakes, Ashland Stakes)
- Music Note (5 Grade 1 wins)
  - Mystic Guide (2021 Dubai World Cup)
- Quick Temper (Graded stakes placed) produced:
  - Cloud Computing (2017 Preakness Stakes)
- Indy Glory (Stakes winner) produced:
  - Artemis Agrotera (Frizette Stakes, Ballerina Stakes)
- Globe Trot (Winner) produced:
  - Global Campaign (Woodward Stakes)
  - Bolt d'Oro (Del Mar Futurity, Frontrunner Stakes)
- Marion Ravenwood (Stakes winner) produced:
  - Idol (Santa Anita Handicap)
  - Nest (Demoiselle Stakes)
- Rags to Riches (Belmont Stakes, Champion) produced:
  - Rhett Butler (Champion in Hungary and Serbia)

== Pedigree ==
Pedigree of A.P. Indy, dark bay or brown horse, 1989
Sire Seattle Slew (USA) 1974	Bold Reasoning (USA); 1968	Boldnesian	Bold Ruler*
Sire Seattle Slew (USA) 1974	Bold Reasoning (USA); 1968	Boldnesian	Alanesian
Sire Seattle Slew (USA) 1974	Bold Reasoning (USA); 1968	Reason to Earn	Hail To Reason
Sire Seattle Slew (USA) 1974	Bold Reasoning (USA); 1968	Reason to Earn	Sailing Home
Sire Seattle Slew (USA) 1974	My Charmer (USA); 1969	Poker	Round Table
Sire Seattle Slew (USA) 1974	My Charmer (USA); 1969	Poker	Glamour
Sire Seattle Slew (USA) 1974	My Charmer (USA); 1969	Fair Charmer	Jet Action
Sire Seattle Slew (USA) 1974	My Charmer (USA); 1969	Fair Charmer	Myrtle Charm
Dam Weekend Surprise (USA) 1980	Secretariat (USA); 1970	Bold Ruler*	Nasrullah
Dam Weekend Surprise (USA) 1980	Secretariat (USA); 1970	Bold Ruler*	Miss Disco
Dam Weekend Surprise (USA) 1980	Secretariat (USA); 1970	Somethingroyal	Princequillo
Dam Weekend Surprise (USA) 1980	Secretariat (USA); 1970	Somethingroyal	Imperatrice
Dam Weekend Surprise (USA) 1980	Lassie Dear (USA); 1974	Buckpasser	Tom Fool
Dam Weekend Surprise (USA) 1980	Lassie Dear (USA); 1974	Buckpasser	Busanda
Dam Weekend Surprise (USA) 1980	Lassie Dear (USA); 1974	Gay Missile	Sir Gaylord
Dam Weekend Surprise (USA) 1980	Lassie Dear (USA); 1974	Gay Missile	Missy Baba, family 3-l

- A.P. Indy is inbred 4s × 3d to the stallion Bold Ruler, meaning that he appears once in the fourth generation on the sire side and once in the third generation on the dam of his pedigree.
