= Tonalist =

American Thoroughbred racehorse

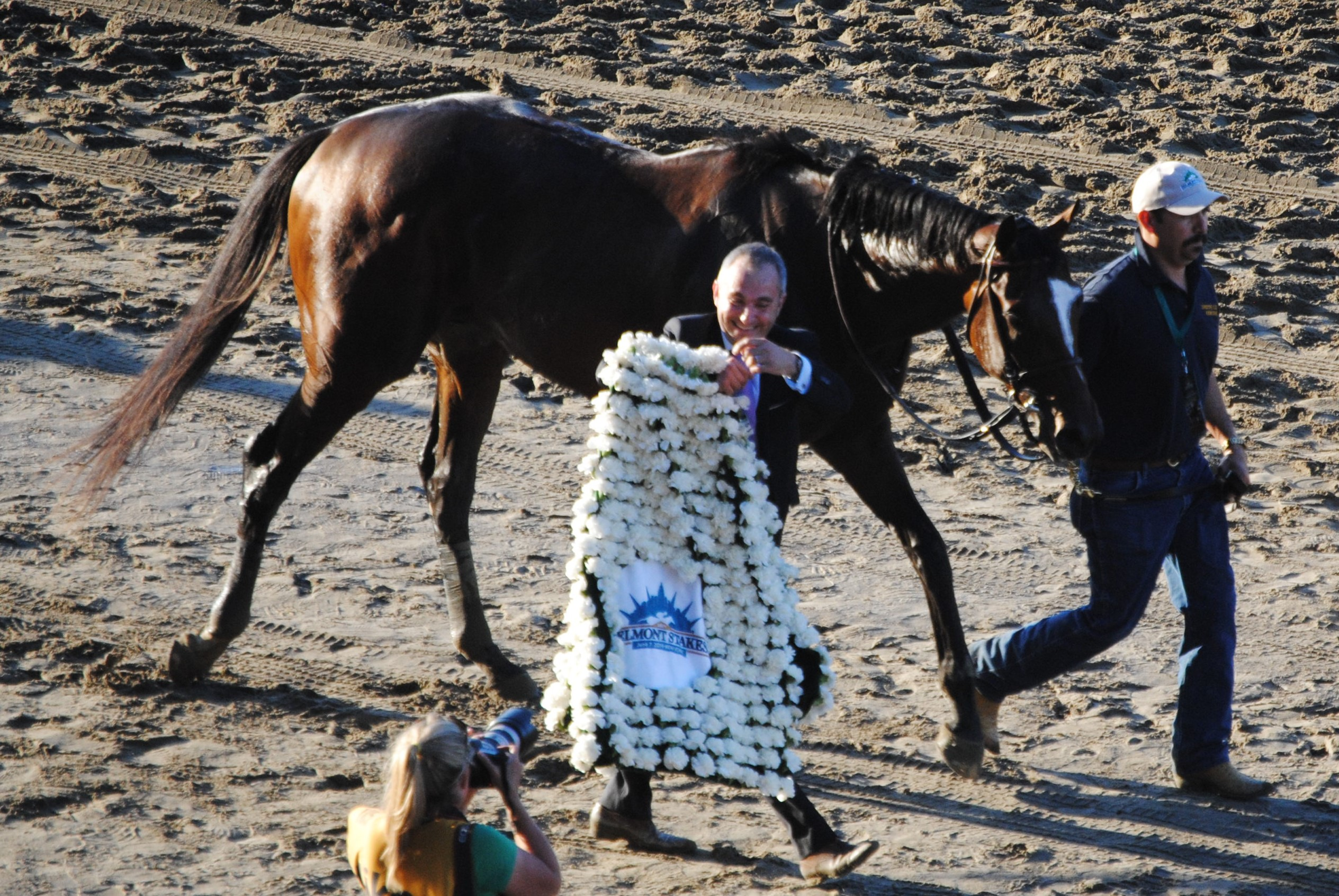
- Tonalist, after winning the 2014 Belmont Stakes
- Sire: Tapit
- Grandsire: Pulpit
- Dam: Settling Mist
- Damsire: Pleasant Colony
- Sex: Colt
- Foaled: February 11, 2011
- Country: United States
- Colour: Bay
- Breeder: Woodslane Farm
- Owner: Neil E. Grayson, Shonna Hughes
- Trainer: Christophe Clement
- Record: 16: 7–4–2
- Earnings: $3,647,000

Major wins
- Peter Pan Stakes (2014); Belmont Stakes (2014); Jockey Club Gold Cup (2014, 2015); Westchester Handicap (2015); Cigar Mile Handicap (2015)

Tonalist (born on February 11, 2011) is an American Thoroughbred racehorse best known for winning the 2014 Belmont Stakes, beating the favored California Chrome, who was attempting to win the Triple Crown. Tonalist won the Peter Pan Stakes in May 2014. He is the first horse since A.P. Indy in 1992 to win the Peter Pan/Belmont double. Later in the year he defeated older horses to win the Jockey Club Gold Cup.

== Background ==
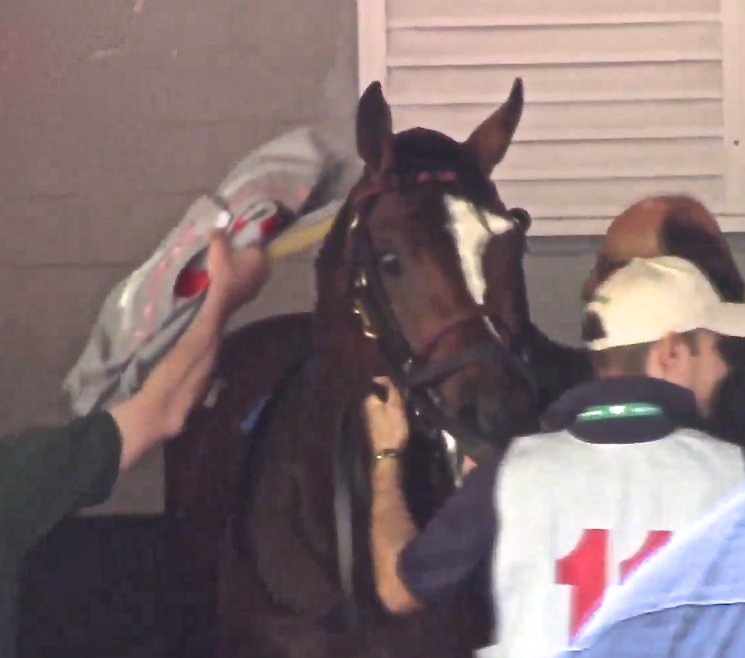
Tonalist in saddling paddock, note distinctively-shaped blaze marking on his face

Tonalist is an unusually large bay colt, standing 17 hands (68 inches, 173 cm) high. with an irregular white blaze bred in Kentucky by the Virginia-based Woodslane Farm. His sire (father) is Tapit, a gray son of Pulpit, who won the Wood Memorial Stakes and started second favorite for the 2004 Kentucky Derby. Tapit has become a successful breeding stallion with other progeny including Hansen, Stardom Bound, Tapitsfly (Breeders' Cup Juvenile Fillies Turf), Tapizar (Breeders' Cup Dirt Mile) and Untapable (Kentucky Oaks). Tonalist's dam (mother), Settling Mist, a daughter of the Kentucky Derby winner Pleasant Colony, won once from nineteen starts in 2002 and 2003. As a great-granddaughter of the broodmare (a mare used for breeding) Missy Baba, Settling Mist was closely related to several major winners including Summer Squall, A.P. Indy, Duke of Marmalade and Lemon Drop Kid.

As a yearling, Tonalist was consigned to the Fasig-Tipton Sale in August 2012, by Wayne and Cathy Sweezey on behalf of Woodlane Farm's owners, Rene and Lauren Woolcott. Wayne Sweezey described the colt as "one of the most stunning horses we had ever had on the farm. I've raised a lot of horses in my time, and he was special – not only in his looks but also in his temperament" but explained that after a "growth spurt" in July he looked less impressive when he entered the sales ring. He was not sold as he failed to reach his reserve price of $195,000. Shortly after the sale Tonalist was bought privately by Robert S. Evans largely because of a family connection: his father Thomas Mellon Evans had won the Kentucky Derby with Pleasant Colony. The colt was sent into training with the French-born trainer Christophe Clement, best known as a trainer of turf horses.

== Racing career ==
=== 2013: two-year-old season ===
On his only appearance as a two-year-old, Tonalist started a 16-1 outsider for a maiden race at Aqueduct Race Track on November 16 and finished fourth of the nine runners behind Matterhorn. According to Equibase, he was towards the rear in the early stages and was forced five wide on the final turn but made some progress in the closing stages.

=== 2014: three-year-old season ===
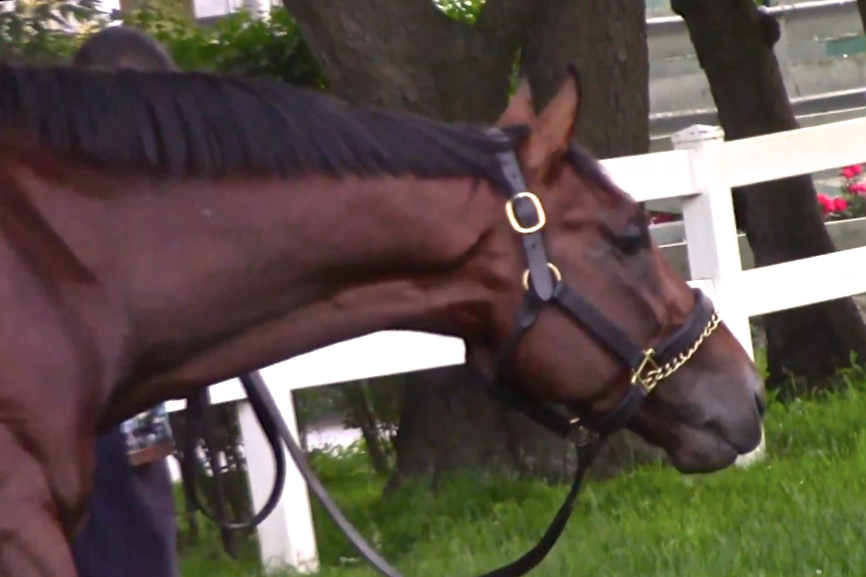
Tonalist after the Belmont

Tonalist began his second season at Gulfstream Park in Florida, winning a maiden race over nine furlongs in January and running second to Constitution in an allowance race a month later. Any chance he had of competing in the major trials for the Triple Crown ended when he contracted a lung infection which disrupted his training schedule. In May he was moved up sharply in class when he contested the Grade II Peter Pan Stakes at Belmont Park. Wearing blinkers for the first time, he was ridden by Joel Rosario and started the 6-5 favorite against six opponents on a "sloppy" track. He stumbled at the start but recovered to take the lead after a quarter of a mile and went clear in the straight to win by four lengths from Commissioner. After the race Clement commented "What impressed me was the last eighth of a mile, when he opened up again. I was very worried about the wet track. I don't breeze my horses on the wet track so that was a complete question mark. He answered that pretty nicely. Let's see how the horse comes out of it, but of course we have to think about the Belmont Stakes". Rosario said "He was doing it easy; he was doing it on his own. I don't think we were going that fast. He can go a mile and a half; I think he can run all day. He's a big horse with a long stride, when you get him in the bridle, the more you ask, the more he'll give".

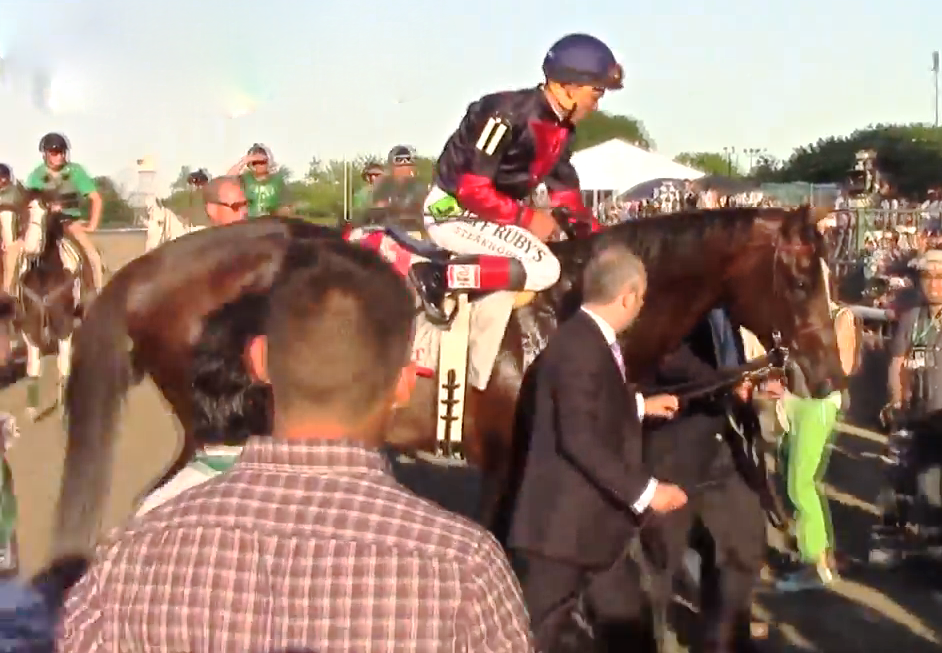
Tonalist after winning the 2014 Belmont, Joel Rosario up

On June 7, in front of a crowd of 120,000, Tonalist contested the 146th running of the Belmont Stakes which attracted much attention as California Chrome, the winner of the Kentucky Derby and Preakness Stakes attempted to become the first horse since Affirmed in 1978 to complete the Triple Crown. Clement professed his lack of concern when Tonalist was drawn on the complete outside of the eleven runner field, saying "He's a really, really big horse with a long stride, so he can basically run his own race without worrying about anybody else." After a late surge of support in the betting, he started the 9.2/1 fifth choice behind California Chrome, Wicked Strong, Ride on Curlin (runner-up in the Preakness) and Commanding Curve (runner-up in the Derby). Tonalist broke well from his outside draw and was third behind Commissioner and General A Rod after the first half mile. He maintained his position despite being forced four wide on the final turn and gradually wore down the opposition in the straight to win by a head from Commissioner, with Medal Count in third and California Chrome dead heating with Wicked Strong for fourth. After the race Rosario commented "He was going easy, I didn't want to be too far behind. When I got to the three-eighths pole I was a little confident. I was worried a little bit turning for home, but he started picking them up." Evans said "This morning I went to my father's grave and thanked him for putting me in this position. I've been where Steve Coburn has been, and it's not fun. I remember it was real quiet after we lost [when Pleasant Colony finished third in the Belmont] in 1981." When asked to respond to Coburn's statement that he had taken the "coward's way" by not running his horse in the first two legs of the series, Evans said "I don’t think I have a comment on that".

Tonalist returned from a seven-week break for the Jim Dandy Stakes over nine furlongs at Saratoga Race Course on July 26. He raced in fifth place before making progress in the straight but was unable to catch Wicked Strong and finished second, beaten two and a quarter lengths. In the Travers Stakes on August 23, he pressed the pace on front-running Bayern and ran second for most of the race, but though he ran willingly, finished third behind winner V.E. Day and second place Wicked Strong. On September 27 Tonalist faced Wicked Strong, V.E. Day and the leading older horse Moreno in the Jockey Club Gold Cup over ten furlongs at Belmont. For this race Clement removed the blinkers that the colt had worn in his recent races. He started the 3-1 favorite and won by one and three-quarter lengths from Zivo with Long River in third. Moreno was disqualified from fourth to last for cutting in and clipping heels with Wicked Strong, resulting in the fall of his jockey, Rajiv Maragh, who suffered a broken arm. Wicked Strong ran loose on the track, but did not cause problems for the other horses as he moved to the outside. After the race, Clement admitted that he should have run the horse without blinkers in the Travers while Rosario said "He didn't get out very quick, but I just let him run on his own... He's a one-paced horse, and when he starts going, he goes forever".

In the thirty-first running of the Breeders' Cup Classic at Santa Anita Park on November 1, Tonalist started the 4.4/1 joint second choice in the betting, behind Shared Belief and alongside California Chrome. Rosario held the colt up at the back of the fourteen runner field in the early stages and although Tonalist made steady progress in the second half of the race he never looked likely to threaten the leaders and finished fifth, five length behind the winner Bayern.

=== 2015: four-year-old season ===
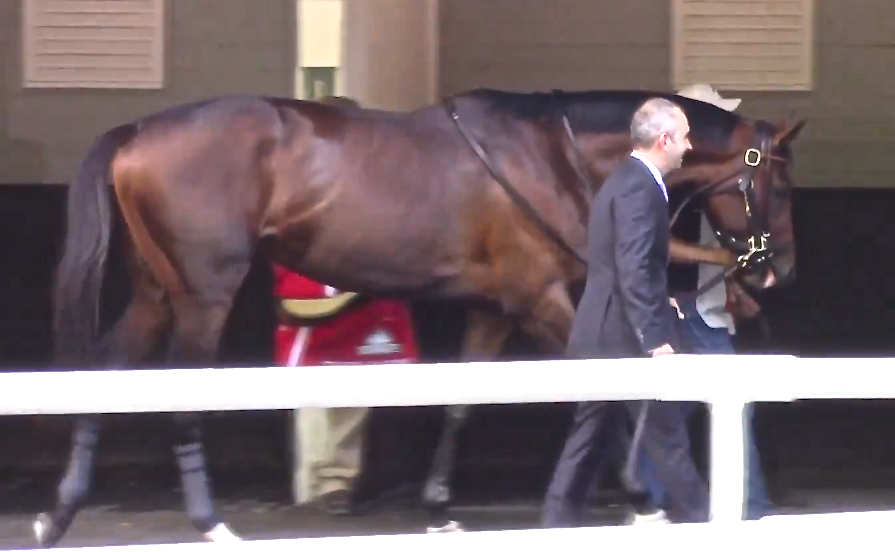
Tonalist in the saddling paddock prior to the 2014 Belmont

Tonalist began his third season in the Grade III Westchester Handicap at Belmont on May 2, 2015. He maintained his perfect record at the track, overcoming a low start to win by three and three-quarter lengths from Confrontation. Commenting on the colt's progress, his jockey Joe Bravo said, "He was a boy (when I rode him at Gulfstream) and it's funny to now see him as a man. He just completely grew into himself." On 6 June, Tonalist started the 1.7/1 favorite for the Metropolitan Handicap over a mile at Belmont, facing a field which included Bayern, Wicked Strong and Honor Code. After being restrained in the early stages he made steady progress in the straight and finished second, three and three-quarter lengths behind the winner Honor Code. Four weeks later, Tonalist carried top weight of 123 pounds in the Suburban Handicap and started 9/20 favorite but was beaten a head into second by the James Jerkens-trained Effinex. The colt was the beaten favorite for the third time in succession when he contested the Whitney Stakes at Saratoga on August 8: on this occasion he finished strongly after trailing the field for most of the way to take third behind Honor Code and Liam's Map.

On October 3, after an eight-week break, Tonalist attempted to repeat his 2014 success in the Jockey Club Gold Cup and started favorite ahead of five opponents including Effinex, Wicked Strong and Constitution (Donn Handicap). After racing towards the rear he took the lead in the stretch and drew away to win by four and three quarter lengths from Wicked Strong, with Effinex almost seven lengths back in third. Clement commented "I've never lost my faith in the horse. I never thought he was disappointing, he was a bit unlucky for the year, but the way he won today was very impressive".

Following a fifth-place finish in the Breeders' Cup Classic on October 31 and a win in the Cigar Mile Handicap on November 28, Tonalist was retired. Owner Robert Evans said at the time of Tonalist's retirement that the horse was still sound and he was planning to race him in 2016, but "the economic pressures make it hard to keep him in training." Tonalist will stand at Bill Farish's Lane's End Farm in 2016.

== Pedigree ==
Pedigree of Tonalist, bay colt, 2011
Sire Tapit (USA) 2001	Pulpit (USA); 1994	A.P. Indy	Seattle Slew
Sire Tapit (USA) 2001	Pulpit (USA); 1994	A.P. Indy	Weekend Surprise
Sire Tapit (USA) 2001	Pulpit (USA); 1994	Preach	Mr. Prospector
Sire Tapit (USA) 2001	Pulpit (USA); 1994	Preach	Narrate
Sire Tapit (USA) 2001	Tap Your Heels (USA); 1996	Unbridled	Fappiano
Sire Tapit (USA) 2001	Tap Your Heels (USA); 1996	Unbridled	Gana Facil
Sire Tapit (USA) 2001	Tap Your Heels (USA); 1996	Ruby Slippers	Nijinsky II
Sire Tapit (USA) 2001	Tap Your Heels (USA); 1996	Ruby Slippers	Moon Glitter
Dam Settling Mist (USA) 1999	Pleasant Colony (USA); 1978	His Majesty	Ribot
Dam Settling Mist (USA) 1999	Pleasant Colony (USA); 1978	His Majesty	Flower Bowl
Dam Settling Mist (USA) 1999	Pleasant Colony (USA); 1978	Sun Colony	Sunrise Flight
Dam Settling Mist (USA) 1999	Pleasant Colony (USA); 1978	Sun Colony	Colonia
Dam Settling Mist (USA) 1999	Toll Free (USA); 1985	Topsider	Northern Dancer
Dam Settling Mist (USA) 1999	Toll Free (USA); 1985	Topsider	Drumtop
Dam Settling Mist (USA) 1999	Toll Free (USA); 1985	Toll Booth	Buckpasser
Dam Settling Mist (USA) 1999	Toll Free (USA); 1985	Toll Booth	Missy Baba (Family: 3-l)

== See also ==
- List of racehorses
