= Pulpit (horse) =

American-bred Thoroughbred racehorse

- Pulpit's grave at Claiborne Farm
- Sire: A.P. Indy
- Grandsire: Seattle Slew
- Dam: Preach
- Damsire: Mr. Prospector
- Sex: Stallion
- Foaled: February 15, 1994
- Died: December 6, 2012 (aged 18)
- Country: United States
- Colour: Bay
- Breeder: Claiborne Farm
- Owner: Claiborne Farm
- Trainer: Frank L. Brothers
- Record: 6: 4-1-0
- Earnings: $728,200

Major wins
- Fountain of Youth Stakes (1997); Blue Grass Stakes (1997)

Pulpit (February 15, 1994 – December 6, 2012) was an American Thoroughbred racehorse who won the Fountain of Youth Stakes and Blue Grass Stakes and came fourth in the 1997 Kentucky Derby. Injured after that race, he retired to stud at Claiborne Farm near Paris, Kentucky where he became a successful sire. His descendants include leading sire in North America Tapit and multiple American Classic winners such as Tonalist and California Chrome.

== Background ==
Pulpit was bred in Kentucky by Claiborne Farm, who purchased his fifth dam, Knight's Daughter, in 1951. Knight's Daughter produced Hall of Fame inductee Round Table for Claiborne in 1954 and his full sister Monarchy in 1957. Monarchy founded a successful female family, most notably through the full sister's Preach and Yarn, both by Mr. Prospector out of Monarchy's granddaughter Narrate. Preach, herself a Grade I winner, produced twelve winners from fourteen foals. Her most successful offspring was Pulpit, whose sire was the 1992 American Horse of the Year A.P. Indy.

== Racing career ==
Pulpit was unraced as a two-year-old. He made his first start in January 1997, and immediately made an impact by winning his first three starts, including the Grade 2 Fountain of Youth Stakes at Gulfstream Park in Florida.

After finishing second in the Grade 1 Florida Derby, Pulpit dominated his next start, the $700,000 Blue Grass Stakes at Keeneland Race Course in Kentucky. With Shane Sellers aboard, Pulpit drew clear down the stretch and finished 3 1/2 lengths in front of Acceptable. The race solidified his status as a legitimate Kentucky Derby contender.

Running in the 1997 Kentucky Derby, Pulpit finished fourth behind Silver Charm, Captain Bodgit and Free House. He suffered an injury to his left hind leg during the race and was retired to stud duty shortly thereafter.

== Stud career ==
Much like his sire, A.P. Indy, Pulpit proved to be a very successful stallion. As of September 4, 2013, he had produced 861 foals of racing age, with 672 of those starting races and 470 winning. His foals have earned more than $60 million. Pulpit also has the distinction of being the grandsire of the 2014 Kentucky Oaks winner Untapable, 2014 Kentucky Derby and 2014 Preakness winner California Chrome and 2014 Belmont winner Tonalist.

Among his progeny are several graded stakes winners, including:

- Corinthian. Breeders' Cup Dirt Mile
- Essence of Dubai. UAE Derby
- Ice Box. Florida Derby
- Lucky Pulpit, sire of California Chrome
- Mr. Speaker. Belmont Derby
- Parading. Dixie Stakes
- Power Broker. FrontRunner Stakes
- Purge. Jim Dandy Stakes
- Pyro. Louisiana Derby
- Rutherienne. Del Mar Oaks
- Sightseeing. Peter Pan Stakes
- Sky Mesa. Hopeful Stakes
- Stroll. Woodford Reserve Turf Classic
- Tapit. Wood Memorial, sire of Hansen, Tonalist, Frosted and others. Leading sire in North America of 2014, 2015 and 2016

Pulpit died on December 6, 2012, at the age of 18 at Claiborne Farm. He had shown no signs of illness or injury prior to his death.

== Belmont Stakes influence ==
The Belmont Stakes, considered by the National Museum of Racing and Hall of Fame to be the race that is the test of the champion, had over a ten-year period, eight of the ten winners (2014, 2016–2018, 2020–2023) descended through Pulpit, with six of those winners through his son Tapit, and one winner each through his daughters Magical Illusion and Callingmissbrown.

- Pulpit
  - Tapit
    - Tonalist* (Tapit was sire of the 2014 Belmont Stakes winner)
    - Constitution
      - Tiz the Law* (Tapit was grandsire, through his son Constitution, of the 2020 Belmont Stakes winner)
    - Modeling
      - Arcangelo* (Tapit was damsire, through his daughter Modeling, of the 2023 Belmont Stakes winner)
    - Creator* (Tapit was sire of the 2016 Belmont Stakes winner)
    - Tapwrit* (Tapit was sire of the 2017 Belmont Stakes winner)
    - Essential Quality* (Tapit was sire of the 2021 Belmont Stakes winner)
  - Magical Illusion
    - Stage Magic
      - Justify* (Magical Illusion was the granddam, through her daughter Stage Magic, of the 2018 Belmont Stakes winner)
  - Callingmissbrown
    - Mo Donegal* (Callingmissbrown was the dam of the 2022 Belmont Stakes winner)

Note: an asterisk indicates winner of the Belmont Stakes

== Pedigree ==
Pulpit stood at Claiborne Farm and is by A.P. Indy, the 1992 Horse of the Year and an outstanding sire. A.P. Indy is by Triple Crown winner Seattle Slew, and out of Weekend Surprise by Secretariat. Pulpit's female family traces back to one of Claiborne's foundation mares, Knight's Daughter, the dam of Round Table.

Pedigree of Pulpit, bay colt, 1994
Sire A.P. Indy (USA) 1989	Seattle Slew	Bold Reasoning	Boldnesian
Sire A.P. Indy (USA) 1989	Seattle Slew	Bold Reasoning	Reason to Earn
Sire A.P. Indy (USA) 1989	Seattle Slew	My Charmer	Poker
Sire A.P. Indy (USA) 1989	Seattle Slew	My Charmer	Fair Charmer
Sire A.P. Indy (USA) 1989	Weekend Surprise	Secretariat	Bold Ruler
Sire A.P. Indy (USA) 1989	Weekend Surprise	Secretariat	Somethingroyal
Sire A.P. Indy (USA) 1989	Weekend Surprise	Lassie Dear	Buckpasser
Sire A.P. Indy (USA) 1989	Weekend Surprise	Lassie Dear	Gay Missile
Dam Preach (USA) 1989	Mr. Prospector	Raise a Native	Native Dancer
Dam Preach (USA) 1989	Mr. Prospector	Raise a Native	Raise You
Dam Preach (USA) 1989	Mr. Prospector	Gold Digger	Nashua
Dam Preach (USA) 1989	Mr. Prospector	Gold Digger	Sequence
Dam Preach (USA) 1989	Narrate	Honest Pleasure	What a Pleasure
Dam Preach (USA) 1989	Narrate	Honest Pleasure	Tularia
Dam Preach (USA) 1989	Narrate	State	Nijinsky II
Dam Preach (USA) 1989	Narrate	State	Monarchy

Pulpit is inbred 4 × 5 × 5 to Bold Ruler, 5 × 5 to Nasrullah, and 5 × 5 to Princequillo.
