= Stardom Bound =

American-bred Thoroughbred racehorse

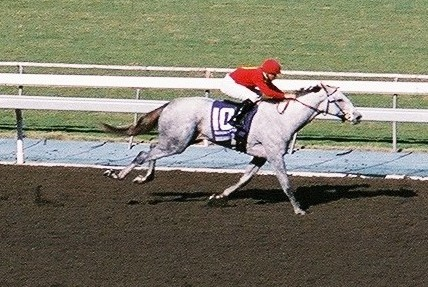
- Stardom Bound wins the BC Juvenile Fillies
- Sire: Tapit
- Grandsire: Pulpit
- Dam: My White Corvette
- Damsire: Tarr Road
- Sex: Mare
- Foaled: 2006
- Country: United States
- Colour: Grey or Roan
- Breeder: Fletcher & Carolyn Gray, John Youngblood
- Owner: Charles Cono; IEAH Stables; IEAH & David Lanzman (March, 2009)
- Trainer: Christopher Paasch (2008); Robert J. Frankel (2009); Rick Dutrow (2009–2010)
- Record: 12 Starts: 5 – 3 – 1
- Earnings: $1,600,600

Major wins
- Del Mar Debutante Stakes (2008); Oak Leaf Stakes (2008); Las Virgenes Stakes (2009); Santa Anita Oaks (2009); American Classics / Breeders' Cup wins: Breeders' Cup Juvenile Fillies (2008)

Awards
- American Champion Two-Year-Old Filly, 2008

Stardom Bound (foaled in Kentucky on April 9, 2006) is an American Thoroughbred racehorse who won the 2008 Breeders' Cup Juvenile Fillies and the Eclipse Award for Champion 2-Year-Old Filly.

Stardom Bound was sired by Tapit (winner of the 2004 Wood Memorial Stakes), a son of Pulpit by A.P. Indy by Seattle Slew. She was from Tapit's first crop and helped propel him to the top of the 2008 Freshmen Sire List. Stardom Bound is out of My White Corvette, who won three of eleven starts. Stardom Bound was My White Corvette's first stakes winner.

She was purchased by Charles Cono in March 2008 at the Ocala Breeders' Sale's auction of 2-year-olds in training for $375,000. Due mainly to health issues (her original trainer, 52-year-old Christopher Paasch, beat a rare form of leukemia), Cono, then age 84, sold her in the November 2008 Fasig-Tipton Kentucky Selected Mix Sale. She was purchased for $5.7 million by IEAH Stables, headed by Michael Iavarone and Richard Schiavo. Her trainer became Bobby Frankel. In March 2009 as part of a deal for the three-year-old colt, I Want Revenge, David Lanzman, the colt's owner, received a twenty-five percent interest in Stardom Bound. In 2010, she was sold for an undisclosed price to Katsumi Yoshida's Northern Farm.

== 2008 racing season ==
In her 2-year-old season, Stardom Bound was compared to Zenyatta; those around her called her "Baby Z" or "Zenyatta Junior". Usually breaking badly (once "in the air" and twice slowly), she ran from off the pace, yet had a strong turn of foot that carried her to the front of the field.

She first attracted attention when winning the 2008 Del Mar Debutante on September 1, 2008. She had raced twice before but difficulties at the gate had hampered her chances each time. In the Debutante, Stardom Bound overcame yet another bad start by unleashing a "monstrous move" while racing seven wide. She would go on to win by over four lengths.

Her next start was on September 27 in the Oak Leaf Stakes. Racing eight wide around the turn, she rallied from last place to win by 3 1/2 lengths. This earned her an automatic berth in the Breeders' Cup Juvenile Fillies on October 24, where she went off as the favorite. She unleashed her run on the turn and won by 1 1/2 lengths.

Stardom Bound won the Eclipse Award as American Champion Two-Year-Old Filly for 2008. Her jockey in the Breeders' Cup Juvenile Fillies, Mike E. Smith, was asked how special Stardom Bound could be next year as a 3-year-old. He replied, "She's got a shot with the Derby horses to tell you the truth."

== 2009 racing season ==
Stardom Bound started her three-year-old in the Las Virgenes Stakes at Santa Anita. She started well but found herself trapped on the rail. Finally finding a gap, she got clear to win by a length. In her next start in the Santa Anita Oaks, Stardom Bound again won, but this time by only a nose. Jockey Mike Smith said, "When I moved out with her turning for home, everybody else went out at the same time and we got caught really wide. From the sixteenth pole home, I thought we could grind ‘em down, but I was worried." It was her fifth consecutive grade 1 win and her last.

On April 4, she raced outside of California for the first time in the Ashland Stakes at Keeneland, a major prep for the Kentucky Oaks. Longshot Hooh Why set a slow pace and Stardom Bound was unable to make up enough ground, finishing third. She was later withdrawn from the Kentucky Oaks. "She just dulled out; she hasn't trained forwardly at all since the Ashland", IEAH Co-president Michael Iavarone told Daily Racing Form. "It seems like we're at the point where she just needs a freshening. She was going to breeze [Sunday], but [exercise rider] Michelle [Nevin] told me she'd be afraid to breeze the filly."

She finally returned to racing in November in the Gazelle Stakes at Aqueduct, but finished fifth.

== Retirement ==
Stardom Bound was retired after failing to win in three starts in 2010 at age four. She was bred to Big Brown in 2010, and was sold while in foal for an undisclosed price to Northern Farm in Japan. The resulting colt was named Seaside Bound. She was bred to King Kamehameha in 2011, producing a colt named King Kanunu in 2012. She was then bred to Deep Impact, producing a filly named April Mist in 2014.

== Race record ==
Date:	Race:	Grade:	Track:	Place:
2008	Maiden Special Weight	None	Del Mar Racetrack	2nd
2008	Sorrento Stakes	GIII	Del Mar Racetrack	2nd
2008	Del Mar Debutante Stakes	GI	Del Mar Racetrack	1st
2008	Oak Leaf Stakes	GI	Santa Anita Park	1st
2008	Breeders' Cup Juvenile Fillies	GI	Santa Anita Park	1st
2009	Las Virgenes Stakes	GI	Santa Anita Park	1st
2009	Santa Anita Oaks	GI	Santa Anita Park	1st
2009	Ashland Stakes	GI	Keeneland	3rd
2009	Gazelle Stakes	GI	Aqueduct	5th
2010	El Encino Stakes	GII	Santa Anita Park	2nd
2010	La Cañada Stakes	GII	Santa Anita Park	7th
2010	Allowance	None	Keeneland	5th
