= Bold Reasoning =

American-bred Thoroughbred racehorse

- Sire: Boldnesian
- Grandsire: Bold Ruler
- Dam: Reason To Earn
- Damsire: Hail To Reason
- Sex: Stallion
- Foaled: 1968
- Country: United States
- Colour: Brown
- Breeder: Leon Savage
- Owner: Kosgrove Stable
- Trainer: Nick Gonzales
- Record: 12: 8-2-0
- Earnings: $189,564

Major wins
- Jersey Derby (1971); Withers Stakes (1971)

Bold Reasoning (April 29, 1968 – April 24, 1975) was an American thoroughbred racehorse. He is best known as being the sire of the 1977 Triple Crown winner, Seattle Slew.

== Background ==
Bold Reasoning was foaled in Florida. He was out of the Hail To Reason mare Reason To Earn, by the Santa Anita Derby winner Boldnesian, a son of Bold Ruler.

== Racing career ==
Bold Reasoning recorded his most important successes as a three-year-old in 1971, winning the Jersey Derby and the Withers Stakes. He set a new track record at Belmont Park for six furlongs as a four-year-old in 1972.

== Stud record ==
Upon retirement, Bold Reasoning only produced three crops of foals at Claiborne Farm before his death on April 24, 1975, due to a breeding shed accident in which he cracked his pelvis. He had to be euthanized after the injury caused severe colic. He sired Seattle Slew in his first crop of foals and the top-rated French two-year-old Super Concorde in his second.
