= Weekend Surprise =

American Thoroughbred racehorse

- Weekend Surprise's grave at Lane's End Farm
- Sire: Secretariat
- Grandsire: Bold Ruler
- Dam: Lassie Dear
- Damsire: Buckpasser
- Sex: Mare
- Foaled: April 8, 1980
- Country: United States
- Colour: Bay
- Breeder: Lane's End Farm
- Owner: William S. Farish
- Trainer: Del W. Carroll
- Jockey: Jorge Velásquez
- Record: 31-7-5-10
- Earnings: $402,892

Major wins
- Schuylerville Stakes (1982); Golden Rod Stakes (1982); Pocahontas Stakes (1982)

Awards
- Kentucky Broodmare of the Year (1992)

Weekend Surprise (April 8, 1980 – March 13, 2001) was an American Thoroughbred racehorse and dam of 1992 American Horse of the Year A.P. Indy and 1990 Preakness Stakes winner Summer Squall. She was sired by the famous Triple Crown winner Secretariat.

Although best known as a broodmare, Weekend Surprise was also a success on the track, winning seven races including the Schuylerville, Golden Rod and Pocahontas Stakes in 1982 as a two-year-old. She also placed in multiple stakes races at ages three and four.

== Racing career ==
Weekend Surprise raced nine times as a two-year-old, winning five times with one second place and two third-place finishes. She won in her first start at Keeneland on April 21, 1982, then finished second in the Rosedale Stakes at Belmont on June 2. She next won the Schuylerville Stakes before finishing fifth in the Spinaway Stakes, both races held at Saratoga in August. She then finished third in two Grade I stakes at Belmont Park – the Matron and Frizette Stakes. She finished the year with two stakes wins at Churchill Downs in the Golden Rod and Pocahontas Stakes. On the Experimental Free Handicap, she was rated 114 pounds – 7 pounds below the two-year-old champion filly Landaluce.

Her three-year-old campaign was less successful, with only 1 win from 10 starts. The highlights were second-place finishes in the Cumberland Handicap and Pleasant Hill Stakes, both at Churchill Downs, and third-place finishes in the Black-Eyed Susan Stakes at Pimlico and the La Troienne Stakes at Churchill Downs.

At age four, the durable mare raced 12 times with only 1 win. The year started with promise when she finished second in both the El Encino and La Canada Stakes, then third in the Santa Margarita Invitational, but she had a series of poor performances over the spring and early summer in California. Shipped back east, she improved to finish third in the Grade I Delaware Handicap, followed by a third and her lone win of the year in allowance races. In her final race on November 9, she finished third in the Grade II Long Look Handicap at the Meadowlands.

== Broodmare career ==
Weekend Surprise produced 14 foals, 9 of whom became winners. She is one of the few mares to have produced two winners of American Classic races, Summer Squall and A. P. Indy. In 1992 she was voted the Kentucky Broodmare of the Year.

Her offspring also include Honor Grades, Tiger Ridge, Devongate, Amirati, Weekend Storm, Norway, Eavesdropper, Welcome Surprise, Saithor, and Weekend In Seattle. She died on March 13, 2001, shortly after foaling a filly by the sire Belong To Me.

== Pedigree ==
Weekend Surprise was sired by Secretariat, the 1973 American Triple Crown winner and two-time Horse of the Year. Thanks in part to the success of Weekend Surprise's son A.P. Indy, Secretariat was the leading broodmare sire in North America of 1992. Her dam Lassie Dear was a stakes winner by Buckpasser, another Horse of the Year and leading broodmare sire. Lassie Dear also produced Group I winner Wolfhound and multiple stakes winners. Another of Lassie Dear's daughters produced American champion Lemon Drop Kid, while a third daughter is the second dam of Epsom Derby winner Ruler of the World. The family traces back to Missy Baba, who also produced Kentucky Broodmare of the Year Toll Booth.

Because of her success as a broodmare, some believe that Weekend Surprise was a "double copy" mare, referring to a hypothetical "X-factor" (a gene or genes carried on the X-chromosome that can result in a large heart). When the "X-factor" is present on both sides of the pedigree, a mare is more likely to pass it on to her offspring. A mare with only one copy of the X-factor has a 50-50 chance of passing on the trait. Sires can only inherit the trait from their dam and can only pass it on to daughters. Secretariat would thus have received his copy from his dam Somethingroyal. Weekend Surprise's dam Lassie Dear may have inherited the trait from her sire, Buckpasser, or through her dam, who also descends from Somethingroyal.

Pedigree of Weekend Surprise, bay mare, foaled April 8, 1980
| Sire Secretariat 1970 | Bold Ruler; 1954 | Nasrullah | Nearco |
| Sire Secretariat 1970 | Bold Ruler; 1954 | Nasrullah | Mumtaz Begum |
| Sire Secretariat 1970 | Bold Ruler; 1954 | Miss Disco | Discovery |
| Sire Secretariat 1970 | Bold Ruler; 1954 | Miss Disco | Outdone |
| Sire Secretariat 1970 | Somethingroyal; 1952 | Princequillo | Prince Rose |
| Sire Secretariat 1970 | Somethingroyal; 1952 | Princequillo | Cosquilla |
| Sire Secretariat 1970 | Somethingroyal; 1952 | Imperatrice | Caruso |
| Sire Secretariat 1970 | Somethingroyal; 1952 | Imperatrice | Cinquepace |
| Dam Lassie Dear 1974 | Buckpasser; 1963 | Tom Fool | Menow |
| Dam Lassie Dear 1974 | Buckpasser; 1963 | Tom Fool | Gaga |
| Dam Lassie Dear 1974 | Buckpasser; 1963 | Busanda | War Admiral |
| Dam Lassie Dear 1974 | Buckpasser; 1963 | Busanda | Businesslike |
| Dam Lassie Dear 1974 | Gay Missile; 1967 | Sir Gaylord | Turn-to |
| Dam Lassie Dear 1974 | Gay Missile; 1967 | Sir Gaylord | Somethingroyal |
| Dam Lassie Dear 1974 | Gay Missile; 1967 | Missy Baba | My Babu |
| Dam Lassie Dear 1974 | Gay Missile; 1967 | Missy Baba | Uvira (family: 3-l) |

Weekend Surprise is inbred 2s × 4d to Somethingroyal, meaning Somethingroyal appears in the 2nd generation of the sire's side of the pedigree and in the fourth generation of the dam's side.
