= California Chrome =

American-bred Thoroughbred racehorse

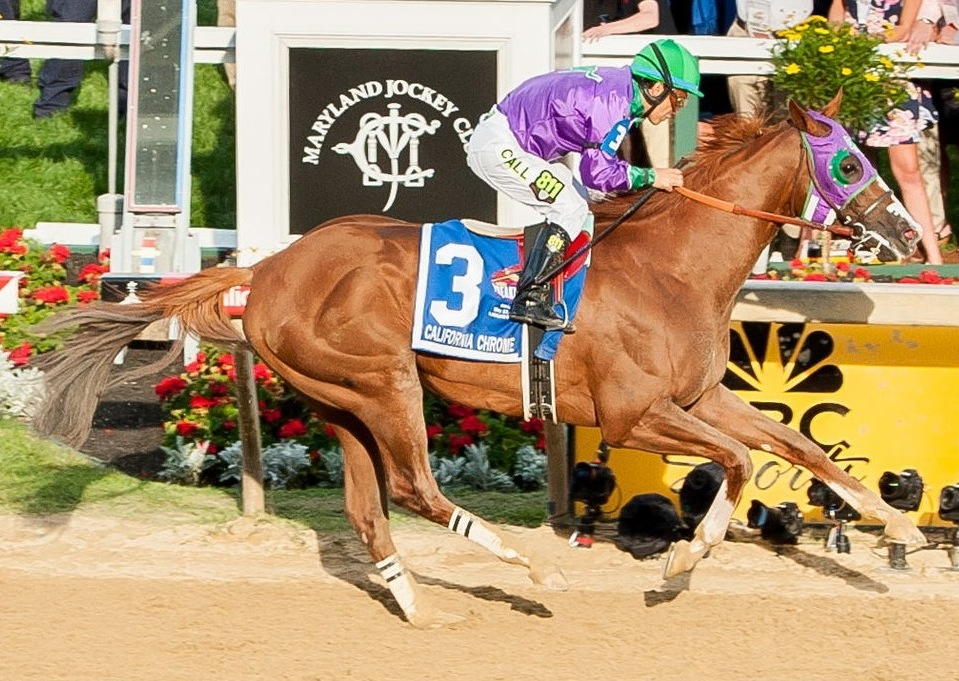
- California Chrome winning the 2014 Preakness Stakes
- Sire: Lucky Pulpit
- Grandsire: Pulpit
- Dam: Love the Chase
- Damsire: Not For Love
- Sex: Stallion
- Foaled: February 18, 2011 (age 15)
- Country: United States
- Color: Chestnut
- Breeder: Perry Martin and Steve Coburn
- Owner: Perry Martin and Steve Coburn (2011–2015); California Chrome LLC (2015–2017)
- Racing colors: Purple, green, donkey on back, green cap (DAP Racing, 2013–2015); Silver/Gray (California Chrome LLC, 2016–2017)
- Trainer: Art Sherman, Alan Sherman
- Record: 27: 16–4–1
- Earnings: US$ $14,752,650

Major wins
- Triple Crown race wins: Kentucky Derby (2014); Preakness Stakes (2014); Graded stakes wins: Awesome Again Stakes (2016); Pacific Classic (2016); San Diego Handicap (2016); Dubai World Cup (2016); San Pasqual Stakes (2016); Hollywood Derby (2014); Santa Anita Derby (2014); San Felipe Stakes (2014); Graduation Stakes (2013); Stakes wins: Winter Challenge (2016); California Cup Derby (2014); King Glorious Stakes (2013)

Awards
- Secretariat Vox Populi Award (2014, 2016); NTRA "Moment of the Year" (2014, 2016); American Horse of the Year (2014, 2016); American Champion Older Dirt Male Horse (2016); American Champion Three-Year-Old Male Horse (2014); California-bred Horse of the Year (2014, 2016); Champion Three-year-old California-bred male (2014); Champion Cal-bred turf horse (2014); Champion California-bred Older Male (2015)

Honors
- National Museum of Racing and Hall of Fame (2023); California Chrome Stakes; California State Assembly concurrent resolution 161; "California Chrome Day", October 11, 2014, Fresno, California
- Last updated on 24 April 2023

California Chrome (foaled February 18, 2011) is a Thoroughbred racehorse who won the 2014 Kentucky Derby, Preakness Stakes, and 2016 Dubai World Cup, and was inducted into the United States Racing Hall of Fame. He was the 2014 and 2016 American Horse of the Year. In 2016, he surpassed Curlin as the all-time leading North American horse in earnings won.

Bred in California, the chestnut-colored horse was named for his flashy white markings, called "Chrome" by horse aficionados. He was bred and originally owned by Perry Martin from Yuba City, California, and Steve Coburn of Topaz Lake, Nevada, who named their partnership DAP Racing, standing for "Dumb Ass Partners"—a tongue-in-cheek response to a passerby who questioned their wisdom in purchasing California Chrome's dam, Love the Chase. In 2015, Coburn sold his minority share to Taylor Made Farm, and a new ownership group, California Chrome, LLC, was formed. The horse is trained by the father–son team of Art and Alan Sherman. Dedicated fans—called "Chromies"—actively supported California Chrome, who has been called "the people's horse".

As a two-year-old, the horse ran inconsistently until teamed with jockey Victor Espinoza. The rapport that developed between the pair led to a six-win streak in 2013–2014. After winning the San Felipe Stakes and Santa Anita Derby, California Chrome was the morning line favorite for the Kentucky Derby. Critics who downplayed his chances of winning were proven wrong when California Chrome won by 1 3/4 lengths even though Espinoza eased him for the final 70 yards (64 m). In the Preakness, he fended off two strong challengers in the homestretch and won by 1 1/2 lengths. He then shipped to Belmont Park with hopes of winning the Triple Crown in the 2014 Belmont Stakes, but was stepped on by the horse next to him at the start, tearing some tissue from his right front heel. With no one aware of his injury until the race was over, he finished fourth in a dead heat. After healing and pasture rest, he ran in the 2014 Breeders' Cup Classic, finishing third, a 3 1/4 lengths behind the winner. California Chrome returned to his winning form in his first start on a turf course in the Hollywood Derby in late November. California Chrome won many accolades and awards in 2014: The California State Legislature unanimously passed a resolution recognizing his outstanding performance, and the city of Fresno proclaimed October 11, 2014, as "California Chrome Day.” He won the 2014 Secretariat Vox Populi Award, his Kentucky Derby win was awarded the NTRA "Moment of the Year", and he won Eclipse Awards for American Champion Three-Year-Old Male Horse and American Horse of the Year.

California Chrome's 2015 season was tumultuous. He began the year with second-place finishes in the San Antonio Stakes and Dubai World Cup. He then was shipped to the United Kingdom to train for the Prince of Wales's Stakes at Royal Ascot but was scratched a few days prior to the race due to a hoof bruise. Upon returning to the US in July 2015, he was diagnosed with bruising on his cannon bones, which ended his 2015 season. Shortly thereafter, Coburn sold his ownership interest. After a rest of several months, he returned to training with Sherman at Los Alamitos Race Course and regained his form with a six-race winning streak in 2016 which included Grade I wins in the Dubai World Cup, the Pacific Classic, and the Awesome Again Stakes before suffering a narrow loss to Arrogate in the Breeders' Cup Classic. He again won the Horse of the Year, Moment of the Year, and Vox Populi awards in 2016. Following the Pegasus World Cup in January 2017, he retired to stud.

In 2023 California Chrome was inducted into the National Museum of Racing and Hall of Fame.

== Background ==
California Chrome was foaled on February 18, 2011, near Coalinga, California, at Harris Farms, the horse breeding division of the Harris Ranch. He is a chestnut with four white stockings (Note: The shorter marking on his left front leg is technically a partial stocking, as the high white only extends up the back half of the leg.) and a blaze. At four years old, he stood 16 hands (64 inches, 163 cm) tall.

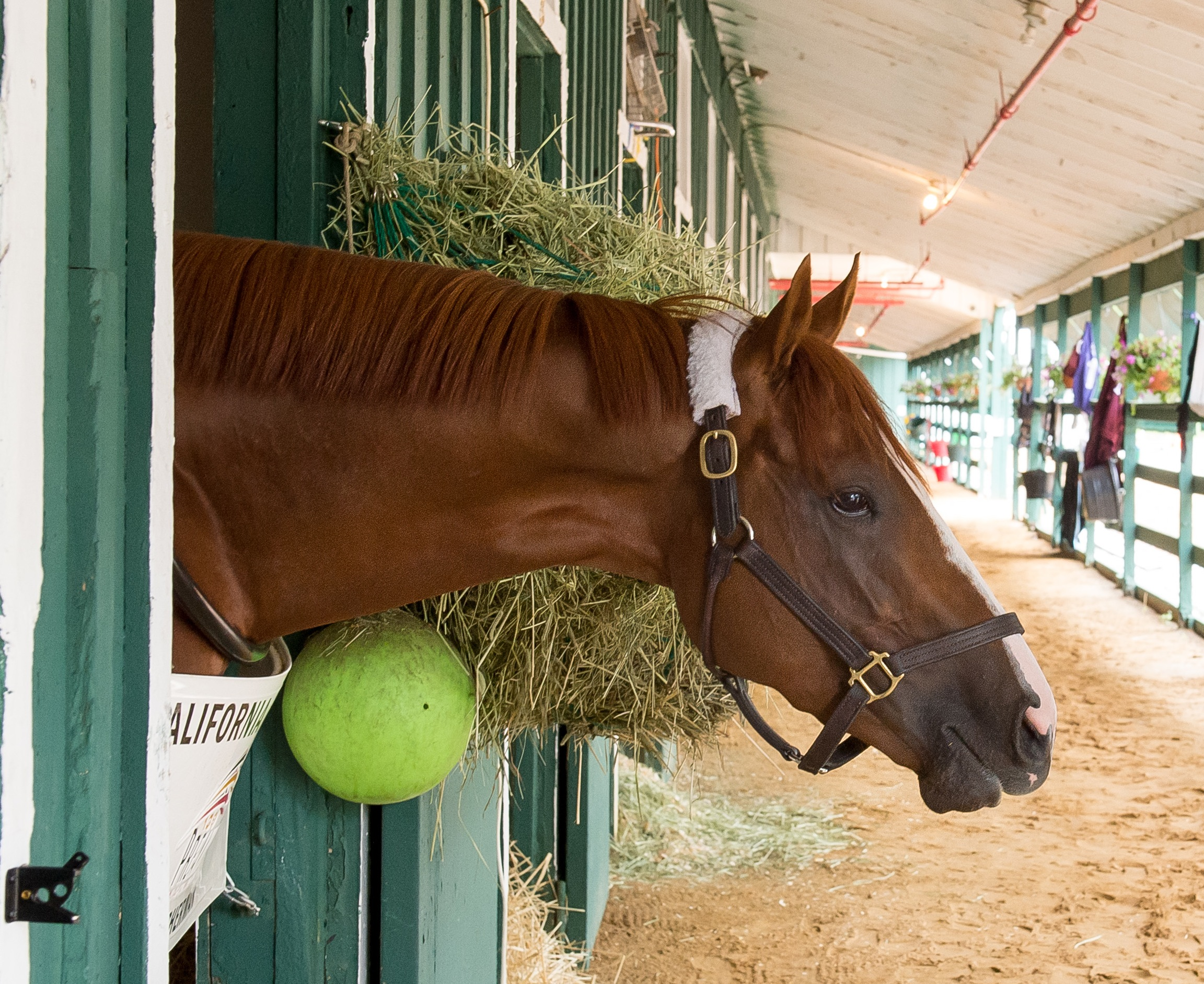
California Chrome in his stall at Pimlico Race Course, May 2014

As a foal, he was nicknamed "Junior" because of his resemblance to his sire, Lucky Pulpit. Lucky Pulpit had won three races, placed in several graded stakes races, and hit the board in 13 of his 22 starts. However, a viral respiratory infection damaged his breathing and limited him to racing over short distances. California Chrome's dam is Love the Chase, and he was her first foal. She was purchased for $30,000 as a two-year-old by an agent for a horse ownership group called the Blinkers On Racing Stable. As a two- and three-year-old filly, she was anxious in the saddling paddock, and as a result, often lost races before she ever got to the starting gate. She ran six times and won on her fourth try in a February 2009 maiden claiming race at Golden Gate Fields. After her win, Steve Coburn and Perry Martin became her owners, ran her two more times, then retired her later that year. They hoped she would become a good broodmare, as she had a promising pedigree. When she retired, it was discovered that she had raced with a breathing problem—an entrapped epiglottis that restricted her air intake, but which could be corrected with surgery. As of 2015, she had given birth to four foals, two fillies and a colt, all full siblings to California Chrome. After California Chrome became a Kentucky Derby contender, Martin and Coburn turned down an offer of $2.1 million for Love the Chase, but ultimately sold her in November 2016 for $1.95 million.

=== Ownership ===
California Chrome was bred by Perry Martin of Yuba City, California, and Steve Coburn of Topaz Lake, Nevada. Their wives, Denise Martin and Carolyn Coburn, were closely involved with the partnership, though not listed as owners on official records kept by Equibase. Perry Martin held a 70% share in the horse and was the managing owner. Coburn owned a 30% interest in the horse and sold his share to Taylor Made Farm in July 2015.

Racing career owners of California Chrome

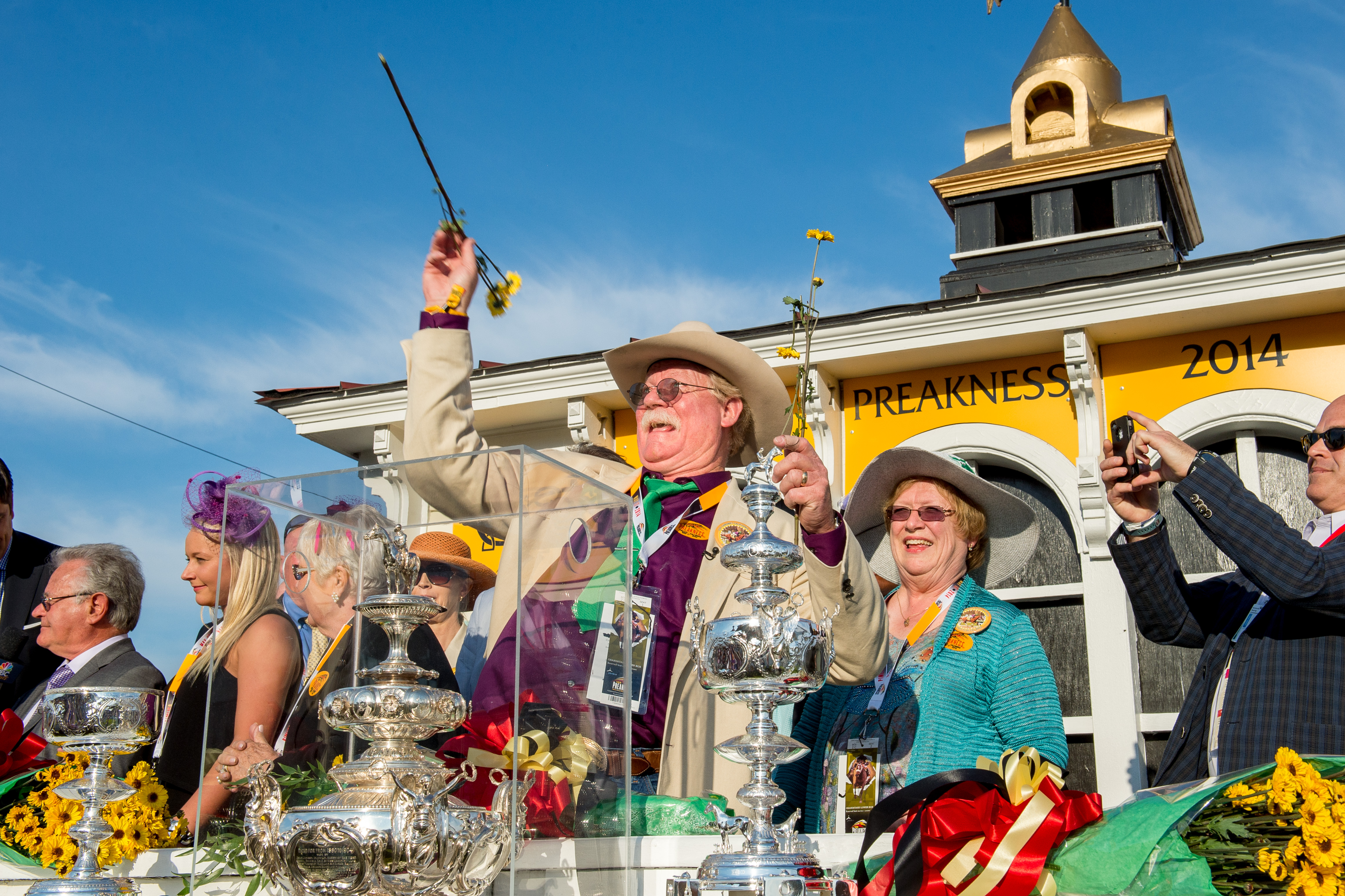
Steve Coburn (center) and Carolyn Coburn, 2014 Preakness Stakes

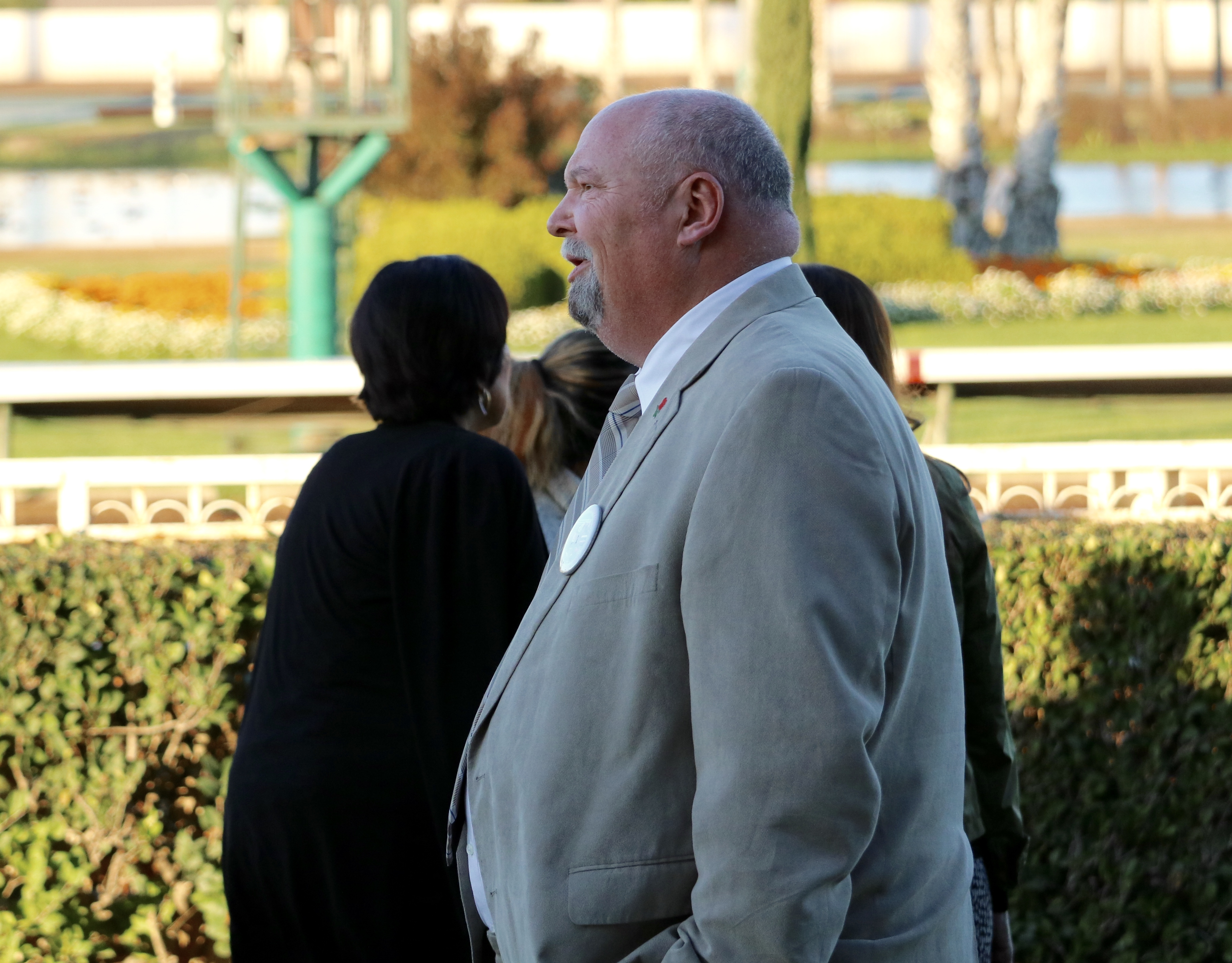
Perry Martin, 2016

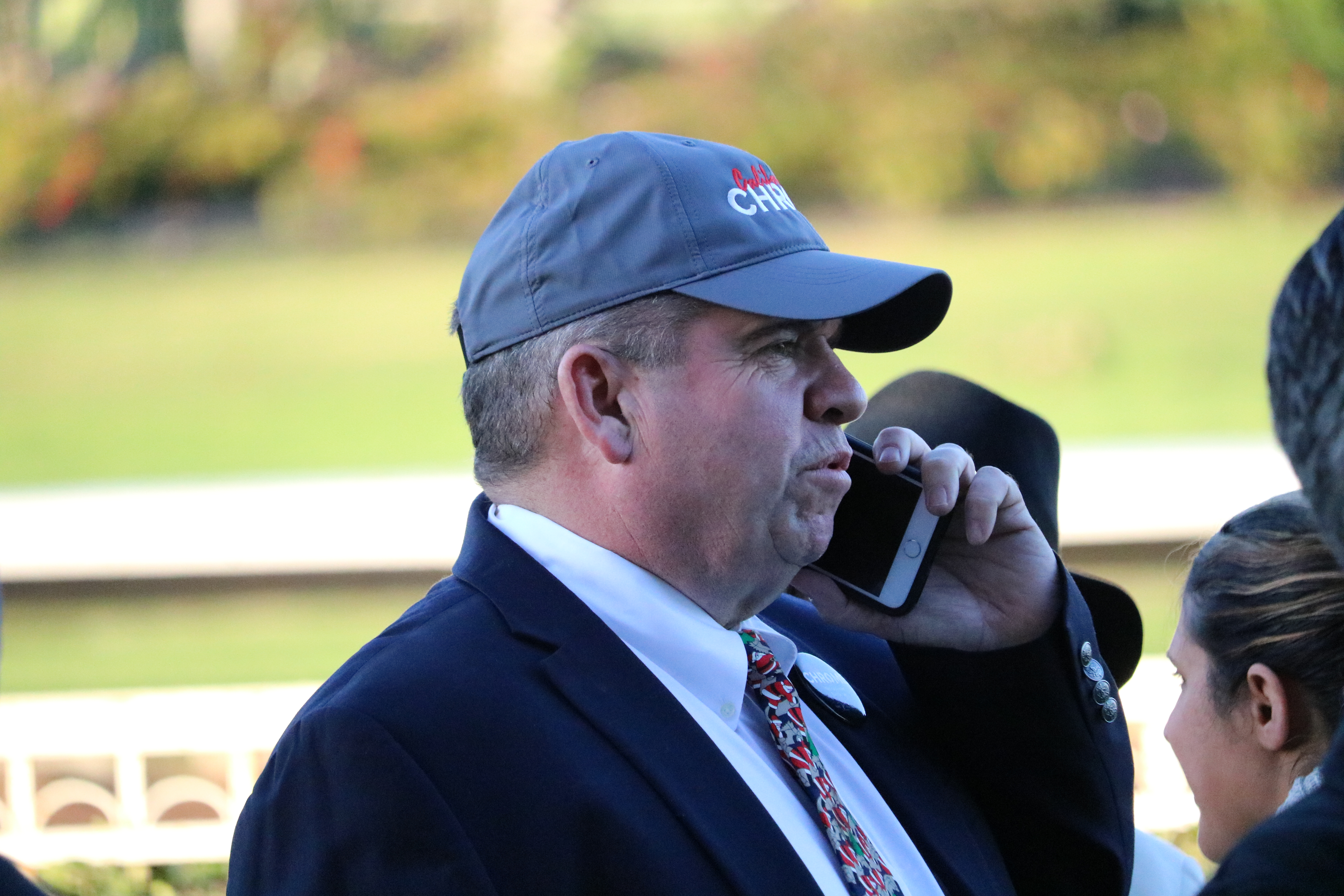
Taylor Made Farms representative Frank Taylor, 2016

Originally, the Martins and Coburns each owned a five percent share in Love the Chase through the Blinkers On Racing Stable syndicate. When Blinkers On Racing Stable dissolved the Love the Chase syndicate, both shareholders wanted to buy the filly, so they formed a partnership and paid $8,000 for her. A casual observer, knowing Love the Chase's modest race record, remarked that only a "dumb ass" would buy her, so Coburn and Martin named their racing operation DAP Racing, for "Dumb Ass Partners". They created a caricature of a buck-toothed donkey to adorn the back of their racing silks, and put the initials "DAP" on the horse's blinker hood and the left front of the jockey's silks.

The Martins and the Coburns had in common a fondness for California Chrome but very different personalities and backgrounds. Melissa Hoppert of The New York Times described the Martins as the "quiet thinkers," noting that Perry Martin planned the mating of Lucky Pulpit to Love the Chase, mapped out a "Road to the Derby" racing plan for California Chrome, and promoted use of a nasal strip for the horse's races. Originally from Chicago, they moved to California in 1987, where Perry Martin was employed as a metallurgist by the Air Force and Denise briefly job shadowed a racehorse trainer in the Sacramento area. Today they own and operate Martin Testing Laboratories (MTL), which tests high-reliability items such as automobile airbags and medical equipment.

"This horse has given everybody else out there the incentive to say, 'you know what? We can do it too' ... we just hope that this horse is letting America know that the little guy can win."

— Steve Coburn, co-owner, May 17, 2014, following the Preakness Stakes

By contrast, Hoppert characterized the more outgoing Coburns as the "public relations arm" of the partnership. Steve Coburn, characterized by the media as "loquacious", described himself and his wife Carolyn as "just everyday people". He worked as a press operator for a company that makes magnetic strips, and Carolyn Coburn retired from a career working payroll in the health care industry. Carolyn introduced Steve to horse racing, and when he was looking for a tax write-off she encouraged him to buy into a racing syndicate instead of purchasing a small airplane.

Taylor Made Farm, which purchased Coburn's share in California Chrome, is headed by Duncan Taylor, president and CEO of the family-owned farm of 1,600 acres (650 ha). His brother, Ben Taylor, is the vice president of the company's Taylor Made Stallions division. The brothers of the Taylor family have been the sole owners of the corporation in Nicholasville, Kentucky since 1986. By early 2016, the horse's ownership was officially listed as "California Chrome, LLC". Perry and Denise Martin were described as the "majority owners" by the Daily Racing Form, and Frank Taylor, boarding manager of Taylor Made, explained that both the Martins and Taylor Made had each sold "a few" shares in the stallion to "select breeders who would support the horse." Martin stated that they had brought in 22 partners. In August 2016, Martin announced that Love the Chase, confirmed in foal to Tapit, would be sold at the November Fasig-Tipton sale, stating that he ultimately would keep a 10% interest in California Chrome and invest in mares suitable for crossing with Chrome.

=== Early years ===
Harris Farms, where California Chrome was bred, foaled, and lived until the age of two, had previously nurtured champions such as two-time Breeders' Cup Classic winner Tiznow. In 2010 Love the Chase was bred to the Harris Farms stallion Lucky Pulpit. CNN reported that the stud fee for the breeding was $2,000. (Note: Prior to the beginning of the 2014 breeding season, Lucky Pulpit had a published stud fee of $2,500, considered quite low in the world of Thoroughbred horse breeding. After the success of California Chrome in 2014, Lucky Pulpit's stud fee was raised to $10,000.) Steve Coburn said he had a dream three weeks before California Chrome's birth that the foal would be a colt with four white feet and a blaze. California Chrome was relatively large for a newborn horse, weighing 137 pounds (62 kg), and active, "running circles around Momma" within two hours of birth. Love the Chase suffered a uterine laceration while foaling, and was placed on an IV due to internal bleeding. The mare and foal were stall-bound together for over a month. She was kept on a catheter that administered anti-bleeding medication, and the farm staff checked her two to three times a day. Because people gave the colt extra attention and affection when they cared for his dam, he imprinted on humans as well as his mother. As a result, California Chrome became very people-focused, a trait that has served him well in race training.

The Martins and Coburns chose California Chrome's official name in 2013 at Brewsters Bar & Grill in Galt, California, a town halfway between their two homes. Each of the four wrote a potential name on pieces of paper and asked a waitress to draw them out of Coburn's cowboy hat. They submitted the names to The Jockey Club ranked in the order drawn. California Chrome, Coburn's choice, was first drawn, and the registry accepted the name. The word "chrome" comes from slang for a horse with flashy white markings. The colt was started under saddle by Harris Farms' trainer Per Antonsen, who described him as a "smart horse" who was "really nice to work with".

=== Sherman Training Stables ===
Perry Martin considered California Chrome a Derby contender even before the colt raced. When the colt was ready to enter race training at age two, Martin asked Steve Sherman, who had trained horses for Martin at Golden Gate Fields, to recommend a trainer based in the highly competitive southern California area. Steve suggested his father, Art, who had an "old school" reputation for patience with young Thoroughbreds and a small racing stable of about 15 horses, which allowed each animal to be given individualized attention. Art Sherman liked the enthusiasm of Martin and Coburn, but when Martin emailed a "Road to the Kentucky Derby" plan outlining which races California Chrome should run, Sherman was dubious. Later, Sherman's son Alan stated, "[Martin] mapped out a trail for this horse; it's actually worked to a 'T', so it's kinda amazing." Art Sherman downplays his role in training California Chrome, saying, "This horse is my California rock star. I'm just his manager."

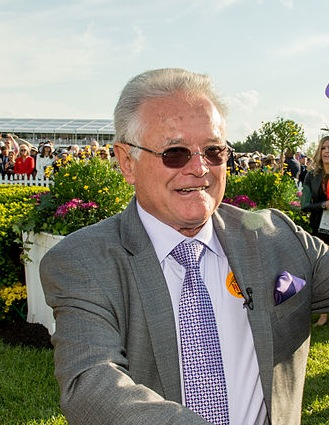
Art Sherman, 2014

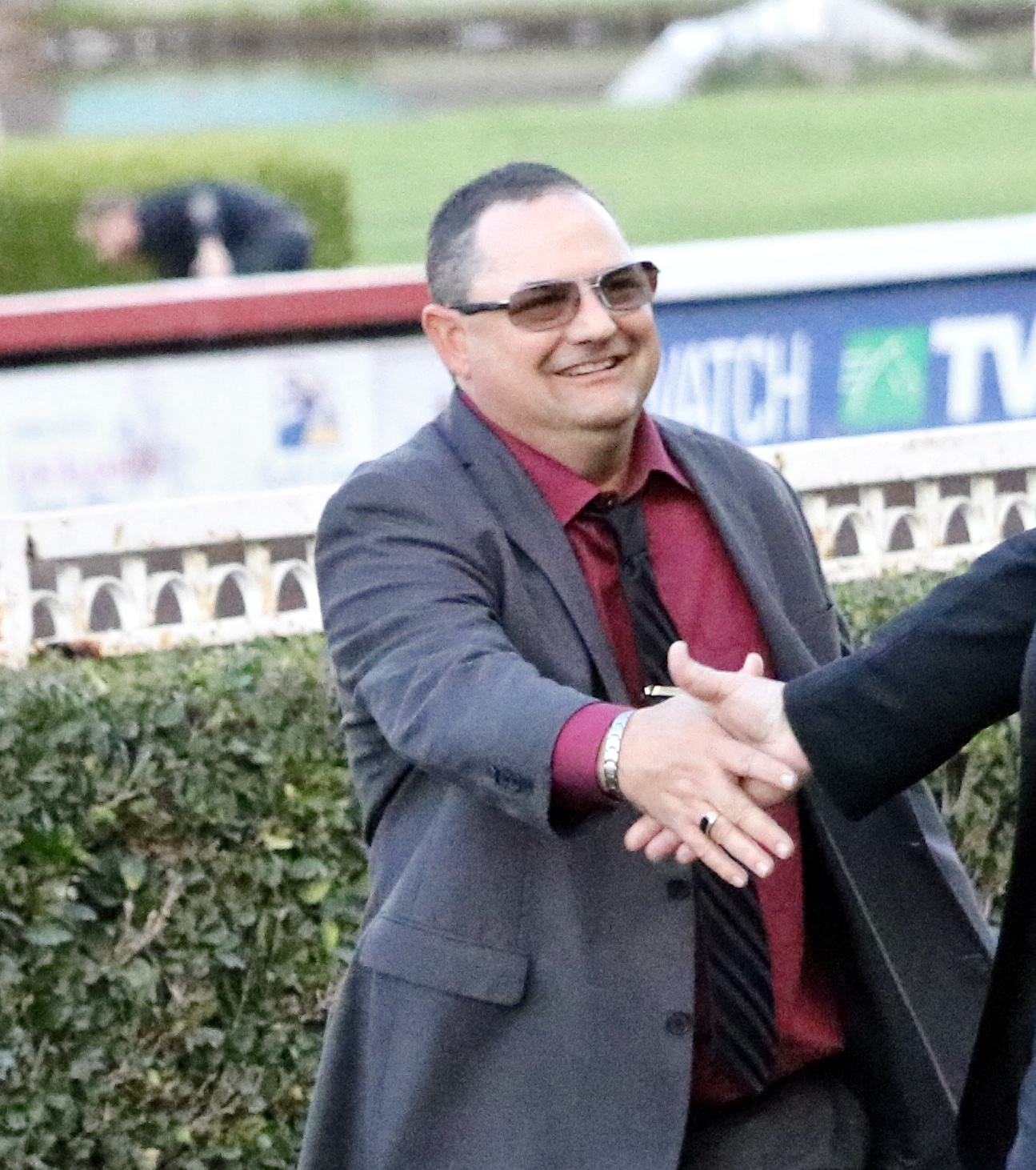
Alan Sherman, 2016

Sherman's first exposure to a Kentucky Derby horse was in 1955, when at the age of 18 he worked for Rex Ellsworth and was the exercise rider of that year's Kentucky Derby winner Swaps. He was a professional jockey from 1957 until 1979, when he turned to training racehorses. California Chrome was the first Kentucky Derby prospect that Sherman had trained. Art Sherman's assistant is his son, Alan, who is also a licensed trainer. Rather than run a separate stable like his brother Steve, Alan has worked with his father since 1991. He does most of the hands-on day-to-day work with California Chrome and stayed with him throughout most of his travels when Art returned to California to oversee the rest of the stable.

Unlike many high-end California Thoroughbred trainers, who usually are headquartered at Santa Anita Park, the Shermans kept horses at Hollywood Park, but when it closed in December 2013, Los Alamitos Race Course picked up some of the Thoroughbred races and trainers who had stabled horses at Hollywood Park, including Sherman. The success of California Chrome, who was conditioned there over the track that had been recently expanded to accommodate longer races, created good publicity for Los Alamitos.

Sherman's groom for California Chrome, beginning with his arrival at the stable, was Raul Rodriguez, a veteran horse handler. Other members of Rodriguez's family were employed by Sherman's operation, and two of his sons were exercise riders for another stable. Rodriguez traveled everywhere with the horse throughout the stallion's world journeys. The groom's bonuses from the wins of California Chrome allowed Rodriguez to purchase a house and 80-acre ranch in his home of Jalisco in Mexico, where he intends to retire.

=== Behavior ===
Observers commented that California Chrome appears to be a very intelligent horse, as he expresses curiosity about everything around him. His idiosyncrasies, included a fondness for one specific brand of horse cookies. (Note: The cookies are an oat-based treat called Mrs. Pasture's horse cookies. The horse also likes carrots, and eats normal equine meals of hay and grain.) His tendency to perform a flehmen response for no obvious reason, particularly when being bathed, prompted the press to claim that he is "smiling". He will deliberately stop and put his ears forward to "pose" for cameras when he hears them clicking. As Alan Sherman explained, "He's a ham"; and exercise rider Willie Delgado gave him an additional nickname, "Vogue". As a younger horse, notably in 2014, he would not walk forward out of horse vans designed for a forward exit; he would only back out, a quirk discovered by the press when he was first unloaded off of an airplane. At the Sherman stables, he had a green tetherball in his stall to play with, but his worst bad habit is that he sometimes bites.

On the track, California Chrome has the ability to use tactical speed at nearly any point in a race. Early in his career, he tended to be slow out of the starting gate; if he had to wait too long for the start, he sometimes expressed anxiety by rocking from side to side, preventing him from being oriented straight forward when the gate opened. He overcame this problem by the end of the 2014 season and learned to break quickly. When outside and in the clear, he usually won. He originally did not run well on the inside or in close quarters; two of his worst finishes were in races where he had the number one post position, and his fourth-place performance in the Belmont Stakes was attributed to both his injury at the start and the number two draw. However, as an older horse, he won both a 2016 prep race at Meydan Racecourse and the Pacific Classic from the number one post.

== Racing history ==
California Chrome's racing silks

DAP Racing Front

DAP Racing Back

California Chrome, LLC

=== 2013: Two-year-old season ===
California Chrome's first start was in a maiden race at Hollywood Park in April 2013, where he placed second by a length. Three weeks later, he won a maiden race by 2 3/4 lengths. In both races, he was ridden by Alberto Delgado. About a month later, California Chrome was entered in the Willard L. Proctor Memorial Stakes. He was one of four horses assigned to carry 120 pounds (54 kg), the highest impost given by the handicapper. Alberto Delgado was out with a broken ankle, so Corey Nakatani was his rider. The colt was second for the first three furlongs but finished fifth in a field of nine. His next two races were at Del Mar racetrack. Delgado returned as his jockey, and California Chrome scored his second career win in the Graduation Stakes, a race limited to California-bred horses, prevailing by 2 3/4 lengths. He carried the same weight over the same distance as his previous race, but this time he wore blinkers and ran on Lasix for the first time in his career. Next was his first graded stakes race, the seven-furlong, Grade I Del Mar Futurity. He ran strongly but finished sixth after he got caught in traffic in a field of 11 horses and was accidentally hit in the face by another jockey's whip. Two months later, California Chrome ran in the Golden State Juvenile Stakes on November 1 at Santa Anita Park, and at 1 mile (1.6 km), was the longest race he had run. He was assigned the number 1 post position and had to wait for all the other horses to load. He became anxious, reared in the gate, was last out, struggled throughout the race, and again finished sixth.

Sherman's assessment of California Chrome's poor performances was that he was still growing and learning how to be a racehorse. But several things began to change. In the fall of 2013, Alberto's younger brother, Willie Delgado, an experienced rider and trainer whose career in Maryland was in the doldrums, moved to California and within a couple of months became the horse's morning exercise rider. At roughly the same time, Alberto was taken off the horse as jockey. In December, California Chrome began wearing a new type of horseshoe. He had developed low heels, and his farrier, Judd Fisher, found a particular style of glued-on horseshoe with a durable, hard, rim pad that raised a horse's heels was suitable for fixing the problem. Instead of gluing it on, Fisher custom-drilled holes into the shoe so it could be nailed to the horse's feet in the manner of a traditional metal shoe. According to Fisher, nailing on the shoes raised the soles of the horse's feet a little bit farther off the ground. It may have been a contributing factor to California Chrome's subsequent series of wins. Aside from that issue, Sherman described the horse's hooves as generally healthy.

Hollywood Park hosted California Chrome's final race of 2013, the King Glorious Stakes on December 22. He had a lighter impost of 119 pounds (54 kg), a shorter distance of seven furlongs, and a new jockey, Victor Espinoza. California Chrome won the race by 6 1/4 lengths, becoming the final stakes winner at Hollywood Park Racetrack, which held its last races that day. Sherman was pleased with Espinoza's riding, and Espinoza was impressed in turn with California Chrome. Alan Sherman later said that it was after this race that he began to think that California Chrome could be a Kentucky Derby contender.

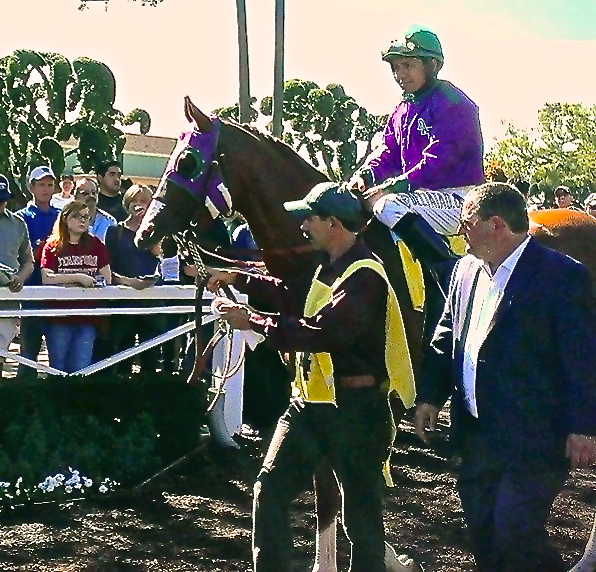
2014 San Felipe Stakes: jockey Victor Espinoza, groom Raul Rodriquez (leading horse), assistant trainer Alan Sherman (right)

=== 2014: Three-year-old season ===
California Chrome began 2014 with the California Cup Derby on January 25. Espinoza returned as his jockey. California Chrome was slow coming out of the gate but quickly moved up to third, took the lead coming into the homestretch, and won by 5 1/2 lengths. Sherman noted that it was the second consecutive race where the horse pulled clear and won by a decisive margin, stating, "It's like the light bulb has gone on."

California Chrome's first graded stakes win was the March 8 Grade II San Felipe Stakes. Espinoza tried a different riding tactic and let the horse go to the lead right out of the gate. California Chrome led most of the way, and after Espinoza gave him one tap on the shoulder with the whip, the horse pulled away from the field at the top of the homestretch and won by 7 1/2 lengths. Alan Sherman said, "My jaw dropped", while Art Sherman joked, "I'm glad I'm training at Los Alamitos, because he looked like a 350 [yard] horse coming out of the gate"; a reference to Quarter Horse racing sprint distances. Espinoza remarked, "I wanted to let him enjoy his race," later adding, "I wanted to see if he [could] go wire to wire ... that was the day I found out how much he loves to run." The San Felipe was California Chrome's first win in a race open to all three-year-olds, not just California-breds, and earned him 50 points in the Road to the Kentucky Derby system.

California Chrome's first Grade I win was the Santa Anita Derby on April 8. California Chrome was at the front of the field by the quarter pole and went on to win the $1 million race by 5 1/4 lengths. Prior to the race, his owners had turned down a $6 million offer for a 51% controlling interest in the colt that would have mandated putting the horse with a different trainer. Coburn later explained, "This isn't about the money, this is about the dream."

"They would need to sprout wings to get to California Chrome."

— Trevor Denman, track announcer at Santa Anita Park, calling the 2014 San Felipe Stakes

California Chrome's time of 1:47.52 earned him a Beyer Speed Figure of 107, the fastest for any horse in the Road to the Kentucky Derby's final prep races of 2014. It was also the second fastest time in the history of the Santa Anita Derby; the only horses to run faster were Lucky Debonair, Sham, and Indian Charlie, who hold a three-way tie for the record at 1:47:00. The decisive win made him an early favorite to win the 2014 Kentucky Derby and raised speculation that he had the talent to win the Triple Crown. California Chrome's four consecutive wins had a combined victory margin of 24 1/4 lengths. After the Santa Anita Derby, Sherman began to describe the colt as "my Swaps". Of his growing popularity, Denise Martin commented, "He's not just our horse anymore; he's ...the people's horse."

==== Kentucky Derby ====
Prior to 2014, only three California-bred horses had won the Kentucky Derby: Morvich in 1922, Swaps in 1955, and Decidedly in 1962. Besides Swaps, other horses to win both the Santa Anita Derby and the Kentucky Derby were I'll Have Another (2012), Sunday Silence (1989), Winning Colors (1988), Affirmed (1978), Majestic Prince (1969), Lucky Debonair (1965), Determine (1954), and Hill Gail (1952). Steve Coburn predicted a win: "I'm not being cocky, just positive", he said.

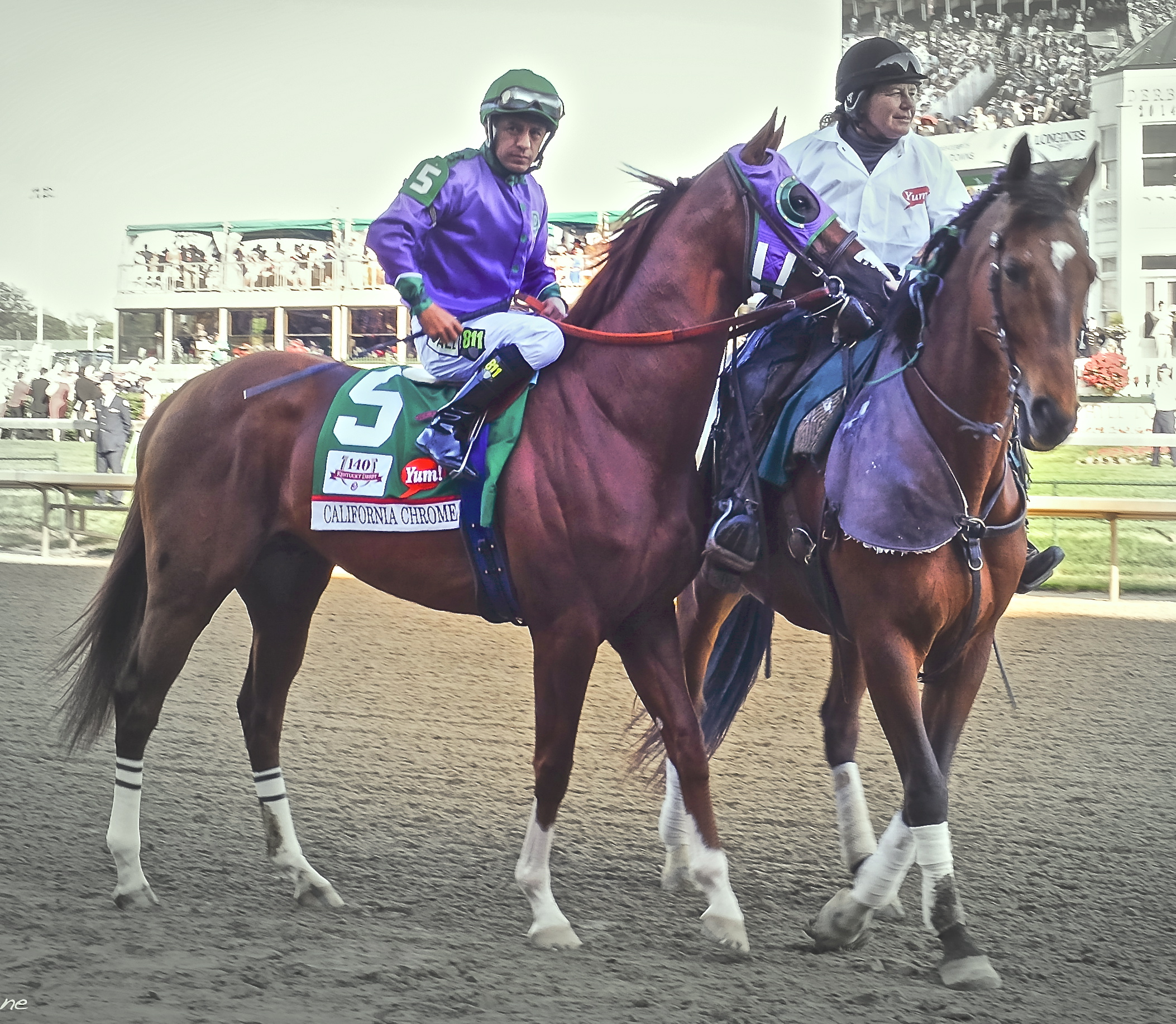
California Chrome (left) in the post parade for the 2014 Kentucky Derby

Prior to the May 3 race, rival trainer Bob Baffert compared California Chrome favorably to War Emblem. (Note: Baffert trained War Emblem to win the 2002 Kentucky Derby and Preakness Stakes with Espinoza as jockey.) Trainer D. Wayne Lukas, who had no entries in the 2014 Derby, told a reporter that he intended to bet on the horse and commented, "He's looked like the real deal ... I like everything about him." On the other hand, Dallas Stewart, trainer of rival Commanding Curve, dismissed California Chrome's chances due to his pedigree and the supposed lack of competition in his prior races. Others doubted his ability because the colt had never raced outside California. In contrast to the critics, reports surfaced that the owners had turned down a new offer of $10 million.

The colt arrived at Churchill Downs in Louisville, Kentucky, on April 28, 2014. He was flown in from California, his first time on a plane, and traveled quietly. Once the plane landed, however, his travel idiosyncrasy was discovered by the waiting press when he refused to be unloaded until he was turned around and backed down the ramp; Alan Sherman explained later that this was also his typical manner of egress from ground-based transportation. Upon arrival at Churchill Downs, the horses entered in the Kentucky Derby each were given a special saddle cloth to wear while exercising on the track, identifying them as Derby contenders and including their name. The one given to California Chrome contained a typographical error, with California misspelled as "Califorina". He wore it the first day and then the track management obtained one with the correct spelling. Critics commented that bringing the horse in late and not giving him a full workout on the track was a mistake, but Sherman's strategy was backed by Lukas. In the days leading up to the race, California Chrome galloped on the track, was walked in the saddling paddock, and schooled at the starting gate. Willie Delgado later remarked that the horse did not particularly like that particular track, saying "he never actually felt comfortable on it."

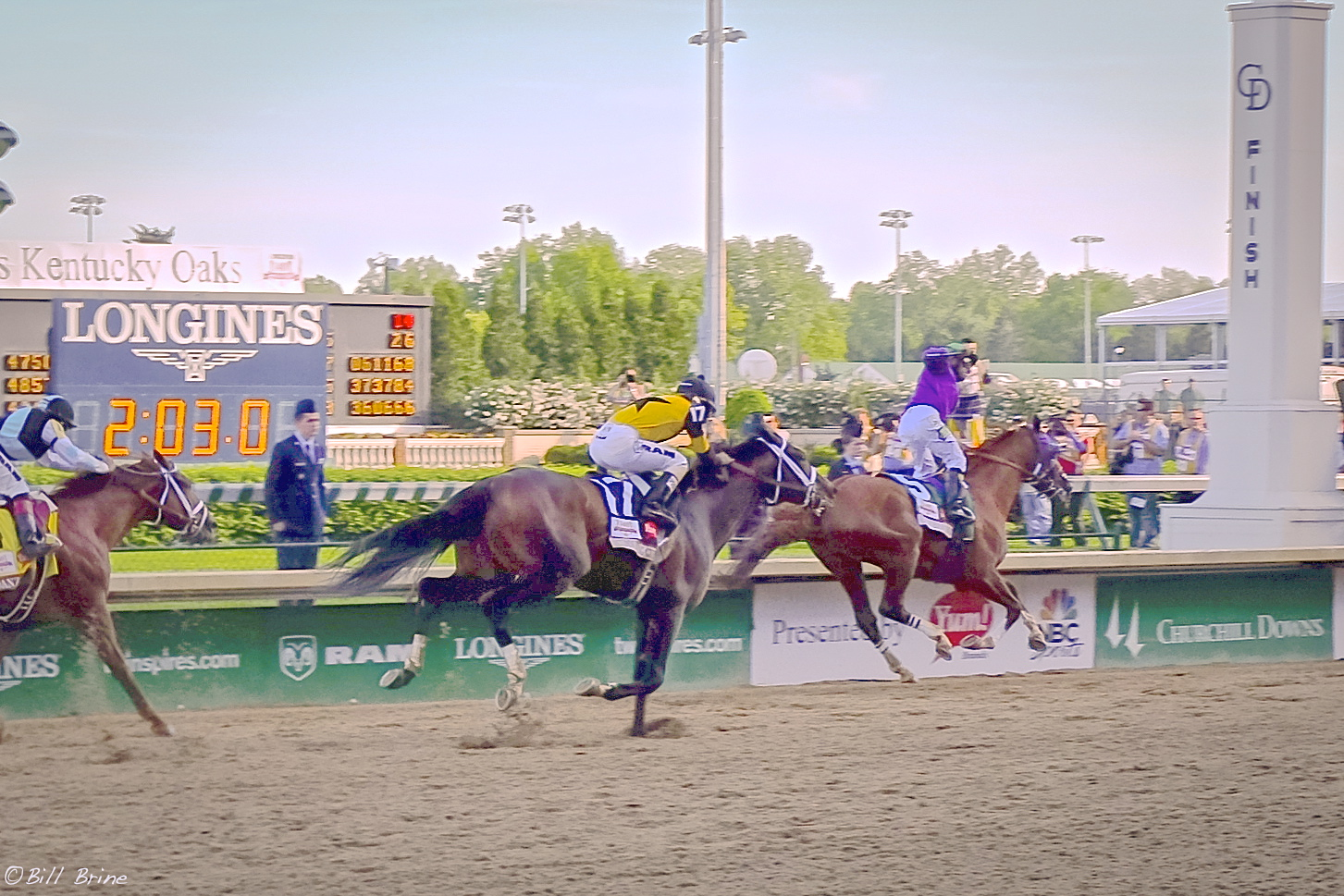
Espinoza celebrates winning the 2014 Kentucky Derby prior to crossing the finish line, standing in his stirrups and raising his whip. Commanding Curve is second, Danza third.

California Chrome's connections drew post position five for the Derby. He was the morning line favorite at odds of 5–2. The press suggested that the number five spot, relatively close to the inside rail, could be a problem owing to the "speed horses" that would go to the front early in the race, surrounding him on both sides, especially if the colt was slow out of the gate. Espinoza countered by pointing out that he won the 2002 Kentucky Derby on War Emblem from the same post position.

In the race, California Chrome had a clean start and could have taken the lead, but Espinoza kept him behind two speed horses and only moved him to the front at the final turn when other horses began to tire. In the homestretch, he opened up a lead of five lengths before Espinoza eased him the last 70 yards of the race, narrowing his winning margin to 1 3/4 lengths. Sherman later explained that Espinoza slowing the colt down at the finish was "saving something for the next one", a reference to the Preakness Stakes to come two weeks later. The winning time of 2:03.66 was relatively slow for a Kentucky Derby, but Sherman described Espinoza's ride as "picture perfect". This win was Espinoza's second Derby victory, and 77-year-old Sherman became the oldest trainer to ever win the race. (Note: Prior to Sherman, Charlie Whittingham held the record when at age 76 he trained Sunday Silence to win the 1989 Kentucky Derby.)

In a post-race press interview, Sherman said he had visited Swaps' grave at the Kentucky Derby Museum prior to the Derby and prayed for success. Trainer Dale Romans, who had asserted that California Chrome had no chance to win, said, "I was very, very wrong ... We might have just seen a super horse and a super trainer. You don't fake your way to the winner's circle at the Kentucky Derby."

==== Preakness Stakes ====
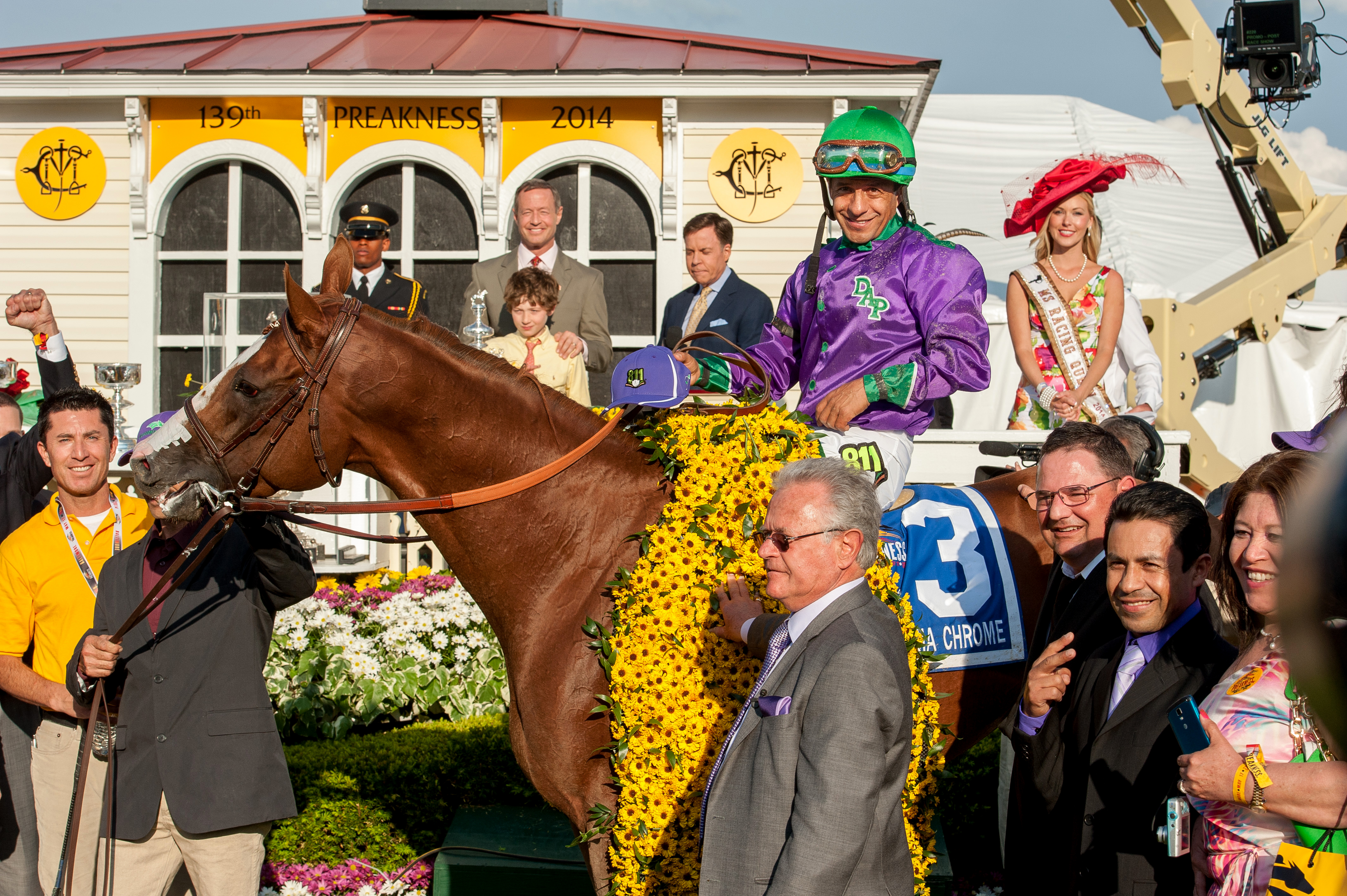
In the winner's circle at the 2014 Preakness Stakes: Art Sherman at horse's shoulder, Espinoza in the saddle, Alan Sherman (wearing glasses) at horse's flank next to Jose Espinoza, brother of Victor

California Chrome shipped on May 12 to Baltimore to run in the 2014 Preakness Stakes on May 17. On the plane were the other two Derby competitors to enter the Preakness: Ride On Curlin and General a Rod. Once on the ground, their van had a police escort from the airport to Pimlico Race Course. When California Chrome arrived at Pimlico, the management at that track welcomed him with two saddlecloths for his workouts, one with the "Califorina" misspelling and the other with the correct spelling; Just as at Churchill Downs, the colt exercised on the Pimlico track but had no timed workouts. Delgado compared the long and narrow Pimlico oval favorably to their home track at Los Alamitos. Sherman did not like having the horse race with only a two-week break, but was confident because California Chrome had gained back weight he had lost running the Derby, plus another 35 pounds (16 kg).

News stories continued to question the colt's ability, noting the relatively slow pace of the Derby and the low Beyer Speed Figure of 97 earned in his win. One trainer said, "California Chrome has to prove again he's the best 3-year-old." The horse was assigned the number three post position in a field of ten horses, and was the morning line odds-on favorite at 3–5. Followers noted that Secretariat had also run the 1973 Preakness Stakes from the number three post. The Thursday before the race, California Chrome was observed coughing after his morning gallop, prompting speculation about his health. He had a small blister in his throat, which he also had prior to the Kentucky Derby, both times treated with a glycerine throat wash. The intense press attention paid to the relatively minor issue was dismissively dubbed "throat-gate" by sportswriter Bill Dwyre of the Los Angeles Times.

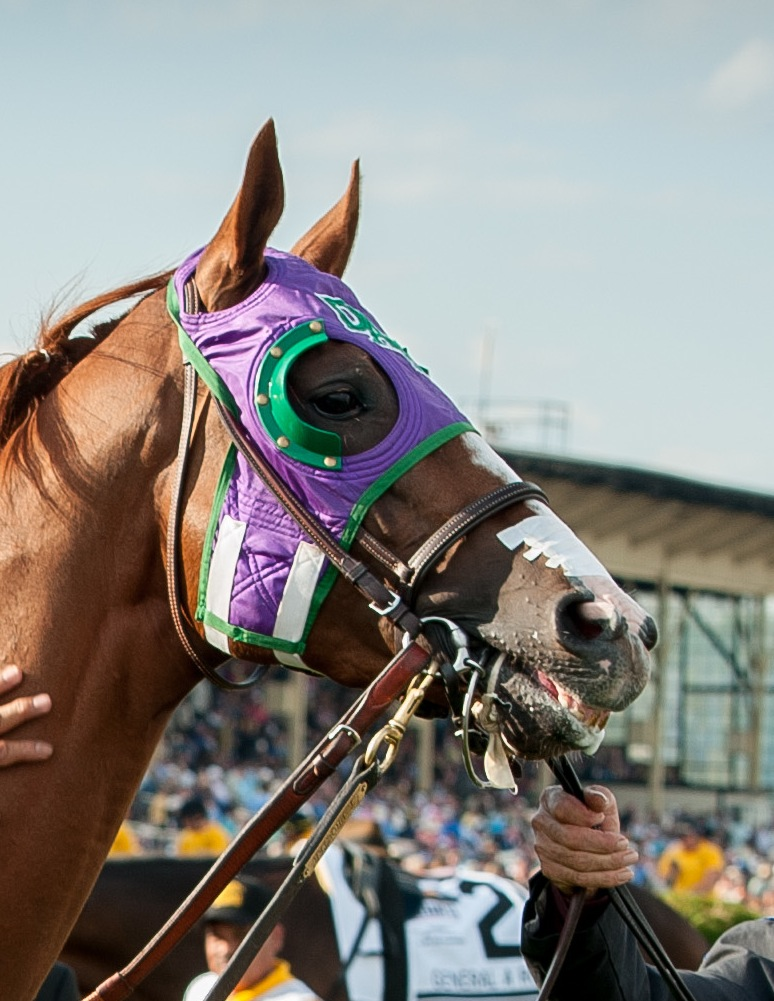
California Chrome wearing his nasal strip at the 2014 Preakness

On race day, California Chrome made a clean start, was close to the front through the backstretch, made his bid for the lead at the far turn, and was first by the top of the stretch. The second-place finisher was Ride on Curlin, who made a strong move late in the race to finish 1 1/2 lengths behind California Chrome. Both held off a challenge from Social Inclusion, who tired and finished third. General a Rod was fourth. The winning time was 1:54:84, earning a Beyer Speed Figure of 105. Social Inclusion's owner, Ron Sanchez, said, "He's the real deal ... My horse came to challenge him, but he found another engine. He was gone." Espinoza's ride was described as "flawless", and the press noted the special affinity between the horse and jockey.

California Chrome became the only California-bred horse ever to win both the Kentucky Derby and the Preakness. The press considered the Preakness to be the horse's strongest victory to date. Baffert, who had won the first two legs of the Triple Crown with Silver Charm (1997), Real Quiet (1998), and War Emblem (2002), sent three different horses against California Chrome, and after Bayern had finished second to last in the Preakness, said, "I'm done chasing him," adding, "he's super the real deal." In post-race interviews, Coburn stated that California Chrome had become "America's Horse".

==== Belmont Stakes ====
The day after the Preakness, a new round of minor press excitement, dubbed "nasalgate", erupted when Sherman commented that Martin might not let California Chrome run in the Belmont Stakes if the New York Racing Association (NYRA) did not allow the horse to wear a nasal strip as he had in his previous six races. (Note: Prior to the 2012 Belmont Stakes, the NYRA stewards had refused to allow I'll Have Another to wear a nasal strip. The issue was of no actual impact in 2012 because I'll Have Another pulled out the day before the race due to injury.) Nasal strips are not considered performance-enhancing, but may reduce airway resistance, lower the risk of exercise-induced pulmonary hemorrhage (EIPH), and aid post-race recovery. Sherman submitted a formal request for permission to use them, and the following day, the NYRA approved their use for all horses on New York tracks, thus resolving the matter.

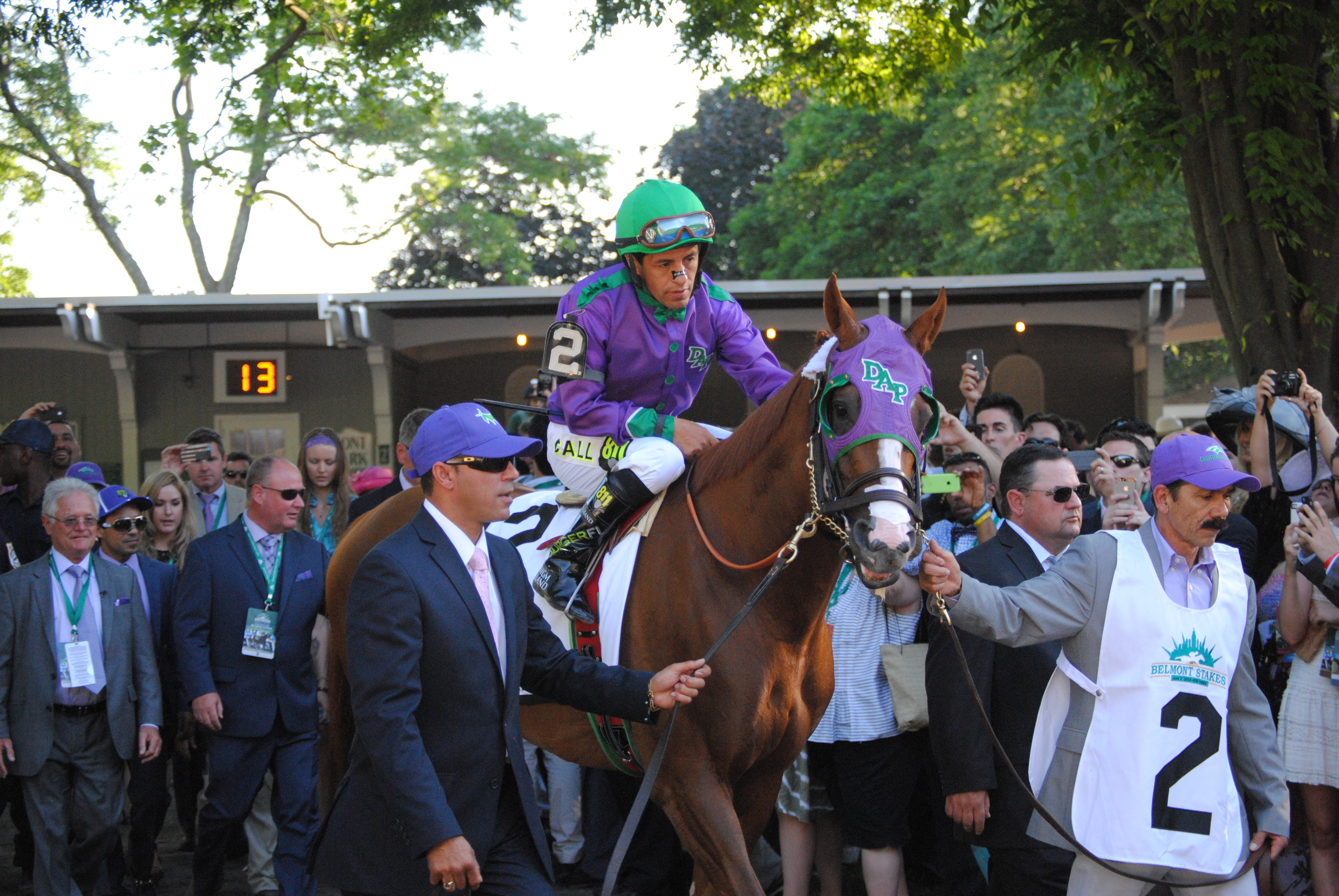
California Chrome leaving the saddling paddock for the 2014 Belmont Stakes with Espinoza up, Rodriguez (right), Alan Sherman, and Delgado (left). Art Sherman visible behind horse

California Chrome shipped to New York on May 20 in a semi-trailer horse van together with Ride On Curlin. They had a police escort through New York City from the Throgs Neck Bridge to Belmont Park. The press reported that Art Sherman believed the misspelled saddle cloths at the Derby and Preakness were a good luck charm, and that he specifically asked Belmont Park for another misspelled cloth along with a properly spelled version. The first week California Chrome spent at the Belmont track was generally uneventful, other than galloping past an opossum that wandered onto the track the morning of May 23. The horse paid little attention to it, but the press pounced on the story; the animal was labeled "Dumb-Ass Possum", and someone created a Twitter account for the creature. Delgado commented, "I can tell you he loves this track, and I don't see him (having) any problem getting a mile and a half." On May 31, Espinoza arrived to give the colt a short workout known as a "breeze". Horse and jockey were greeted by a large contingent of fans and press at about 6:30 a.m., and ran a "sharp" half-mile (0.80 km) officially clocked at 47.69 seconds. A clocker for the Daily Racing Form stated, "He's going to be tough to beat. I think we're going to have a Triple Crown winner."

"This one disappointment should not overshadow in any way what he gave the entire country and the electricity he created during those five magical weeks. The drama that is the Triple Crown has become more Shakespearean than anything else."

— Steve Haskin, Blood-Horse, June 9, 2014

Eleven horses entered the Belmont Stakes on June 7, and California Chrome drew post position 2, the same post position as Secretariat in the 1973 Belmont. Ride On Curlin and General a Rod also entered; they were the only other horses besides California Chrome to contest all three legs of the Triple Crown. Four entries had run in Kentucky Derby but skipped the Preakness, and there were four "New Shooters" who had not run in either of the previous Triple Crown races, including Tonalist and Matterhorn, who each wound up playing a major role in the race. Anticipating the possibility of a Triple Crown champion, several people connected to the last three Triple Crown winners came to the Belmont, including 92-year-old Penny Chenery, owner of Secretariat; Patrice Wolfson, who co-owned Affirmed; and some of Seattle Slew's connections—trainer Billy Turner and co-owner Jim Hill. The jockeys of the three past Triple Crown winners, Steve Cauthen, Jean Cruguet, and Ron Turcotte, also attended. Cauthen, jockey of Affirmed, stated, "This horse has got a great chance of pulling it off," but added, "you never know, that's why they have to run the race."

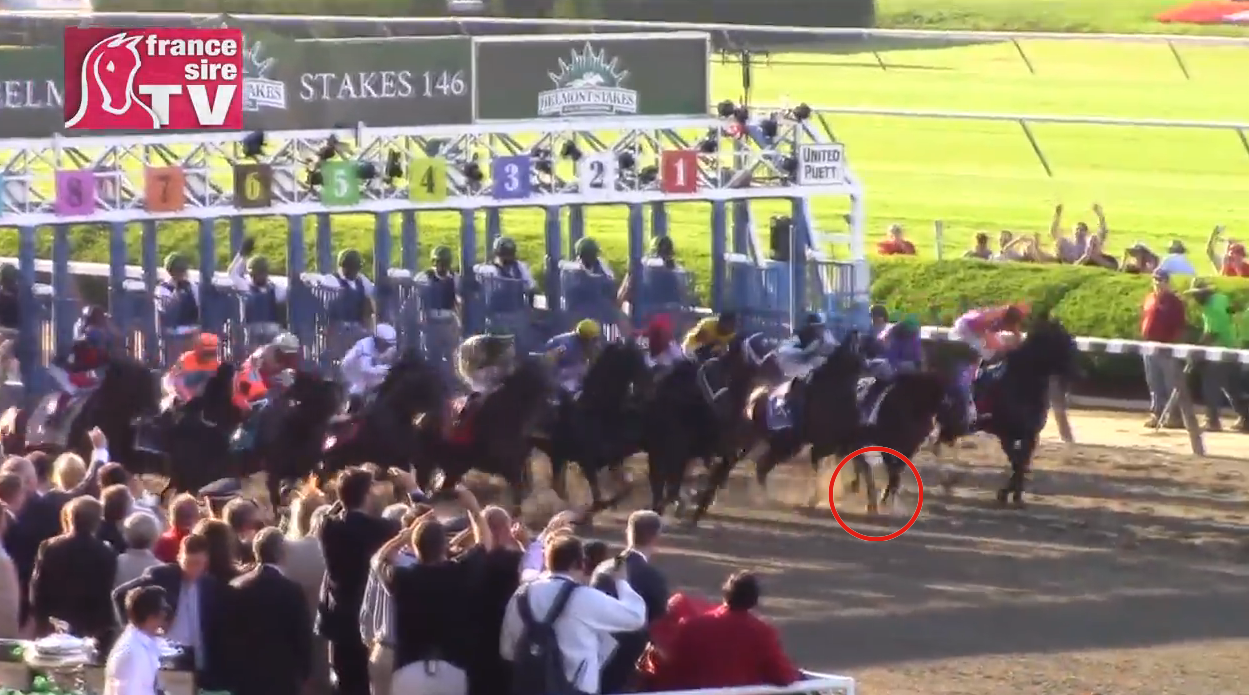
California Chrome (second from right) was stepped on by the number 3 horse while leaving the starting gate at the 2014 Belmont Stakes

On race day California Chrome did not break boldly. Espinoza later explained something felt "off" and he held the horse back a bit instead of going to the lead. When asked to move to the front, the horse did not unleash his usual burst of speed. Immediately following the race, Espinoza said "He was just a little bit empty today". Tonalist won the race, and California Chrome finished fourth in a dead heat with Wicked Strong. Initial post-race analysts criticized Espinoza for not taking the horse to the front early on, but noticed that California Chrome had had some blood on his right front heel. After the race, review of photos taken at the start showed that the horse next to him, Matterhorn, moved too far to the left and stepped on California Chrome's heel as both horses broke from the gate. As a result, California Chrome had run the race with a "chunk" of tissue taken out of his right front heel and a small cut on his tendon. The tendon injury was superficial, but the heel injury may have been a factor in his loss. Sherman explained that he knew that something was not right when he saw the horse throw his head up in the homestretch, and speculated later that the sand and dirt of the racetrack caused pain in the open wound. The following day, Sherman assured the press that both injuries would heal.

Coburn generated controversy after the race, when he said the current Triple Crown system allowed "the coward's way out" because fresh horses who had not run in the Kentucky Derby or Preakness Stakes could challenge horses who contested all three legs. Sherman downplayed the outburst, saying, "[Coburn] was at the heat of the moment ... Sometimes the emotions get in front of you." Two days later, Coburn apologized, saying he wanted to congratulate the owners of Tonalist and adding, "I wanted so much for [California Chrome] to win the Triple Crown for the people of America." Steve Haskin of Blood-Horse magazine summarized the race stating, "when I think back ... the one image that will last forever will be of an exhausted colt walking back through the tunnel with a bloodstained foot, his head down and breathing hard, and every vein protruding from his sweat-soaked body. He had given every ounce of himself, and with it all, still was beaten only 1 3/4 lengths."

California Chrome returned to Los Alamitos, where Sherman's crew treated the wound for about 10 days. After that, they sent California Chrome to Harris Farms where he was turned out on pasture. By early July, his foot was fully healed, he had gained weight, and Sherman was pleased enough with his recovery that he brought the colt back to Los Alamitos to resume training on July 17, two weeks earlier than anticipated.

==== Remainder of 2014 season ====
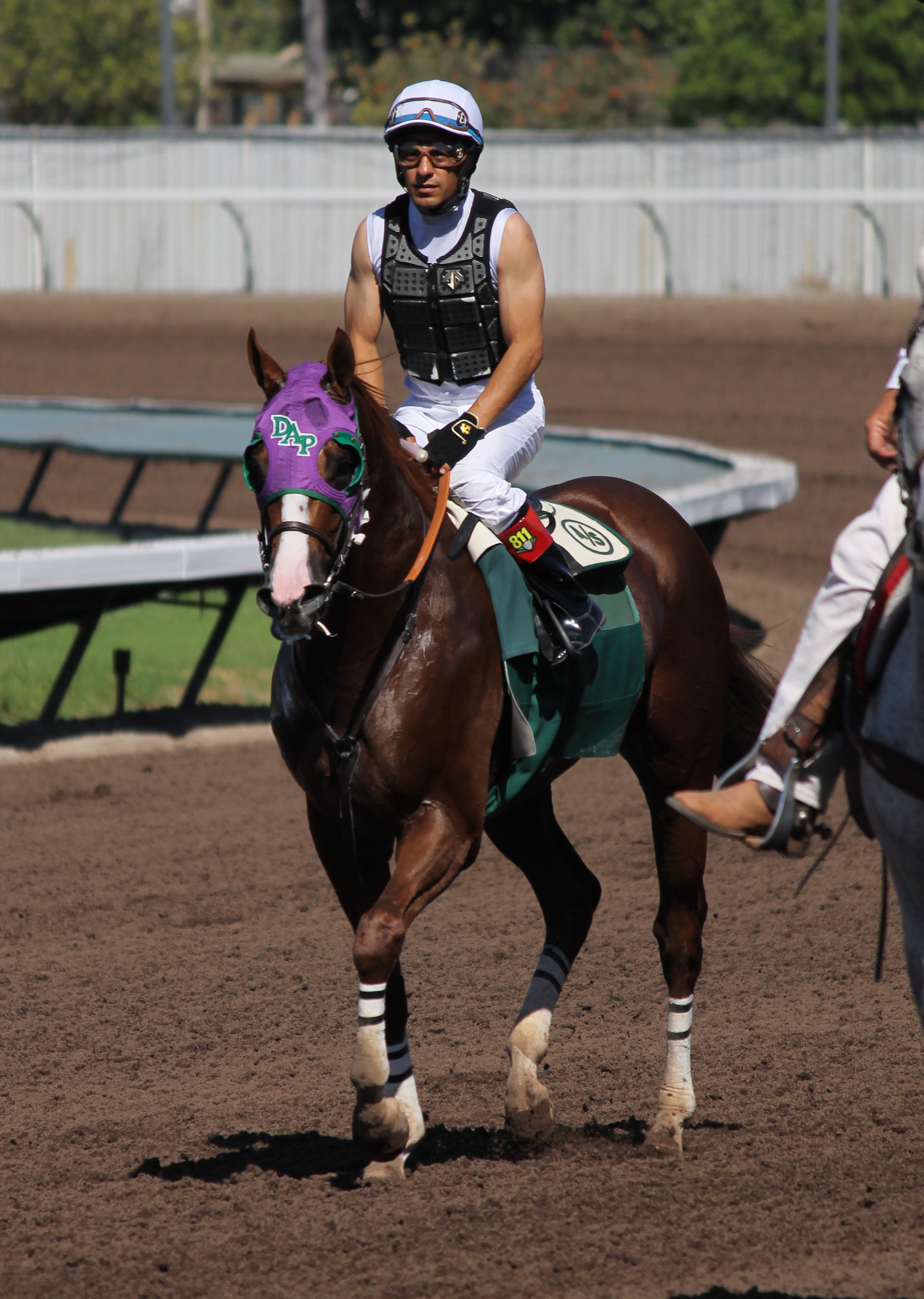
California Chrome and Espinoza in a public workout between races at Los Alamitos in September 2014

California Chrome was the top-ranked three-year-old in the nation by the NTRA in its post-race poll of June 9, 2014, in spite of his Belmont loss, and was fifth-ranked among American horses of all ages. In the June 12 World's Best Racehorse Rankings, published by the International Federation of Horseracing Authorities, he was ranked fifth in the world, one point behind the only American-based horse rated higher, Santa Anita Handicap winner Game On Dude, who was tied for third.

California Chrome raced next in the September 20 Pennsylvania Derby at Parx Racing. He was the favorite, but drew the inside number 1 post position. Kentucky Derby rivals Candy Boy and Tapiture also entered. Bayern, who had a poor performance in the Preakness Stakes but later won the Haskell Invitational, was the second favorite. Parx provided significant financial incentives to any horse entering who previously won a triple crown race or other selected Grade I races, so California Chrome's connections earned $200,000 simply for having him start. Trapped on the rail, first by a speed horse in the initial stages of the race, and again on the far turn by a challenger who faded in the stretch, California Chrome was unable to gain momentum and finished sixth. Bayern had a clean trip, leading wire to wire, and won by 5 3/4 lengths. Espinoza explained, "I never really had a chance to let him run the way he had been running."

The next race was the Breeders' Cup Classic on November 1. Because many leading older horses retired in 2014, most of the main contenders for the 2014 Classic were the three year olds: in addition to California Chrome, former foes Bayern, Candy Boy and Tonalist entered. His chief rival was considered to be the then-undefeated American Champion Two-Year-Old Colt, Shared Belief, a gelding who missed the Triple Crown series due to hoof problems; the two had never faced each other. California Chrome was 4–1 on the morning line, second favorite to Shared Belief. In the race, Bayern bumped into Shared Belief at the start, then took the lead for the duration of the race. California Chrome was clear of traffic, maintained third place for most of the race, was closing at the end, and finished a very close third, only a neck behind winner Bayern, who won by a nose over second-place finisher Toast of New York. Shared Belief was fourth. Post race analysis noted that California Chrome stayed on the outside throughout the race, and actually ran 44 feet farther than the winner. Sherman spoke in positive terms of the horse's finish, stating, "My horse ran his eyeballs out. He was right there, right down to the money. I thought it was a great effort. He came back strong." Espinoza was less enthusiastic: "On the backstretch I thought I had a chance to win... The last sixteenth [California Chrome] was digging as hard as he could, but getting just a little tired. I wish he had one more race. It was a little too much for him today." Coburn visited the colt the following day and stated, "He was full of himself. I think he thought he won. And if the race had been just a little bit longer, I believe he would have."

Later in the month California Chrome shipped to Del Mar, and following workouts on the turf course Sherman entered him in the Hollywood Derby on November 29. It was his first start on a grass race track. Sherman believed that California Chrome would do well running on grass, and it also would open up a variety of potential races to enter in 2015. He was the morning line favorite, with his toughest competitor viewed as Lexie Lou, a filly who defeated colts to win Canada's equivalent of the Kentucky Derby, the Queen's Plate. California Chrome won by two lengths, and the Canadian filly was second. With the win, California Chrome earned four Grade I races for the year and was the only horse in the United States to have Grade I wins in 2014 on both dirt and turf tracks. Espinoza summed up the race by saying, "he's back."

=== 2015: Four-year-old season ===
California Chrome had a tumultuous four-year-old season. The horse began 2015 at Santa Anita in the San Antonio Stakes on February 7, a return matchup with Shared Belief, whose traffic problems in the Classic prevented a true match against California Chrome. Art Sherman and Shared Belief's trainer, Jerry Hollendorfer, were longtime friends and rivals from the Northern California racing circuit, and each anticipated the rivalry between their two horses. Sherman said, "I just want both of us to be at the head of the stretch with no excuses and then it's who gets to the wire first." Shared Belief went off as the favorite, and although California Chrome took the lead by the 3/4 pole, Shared Belief edged him in the final sixteenth and won, with California Chrome second by a length and a half. California Chrome next shipped to Meydan Racecourse for the Dubai World Cup on March 28, where he needed to run at night, under artificial lighting, and without Lasix. He went off as the favorite but finished second to the Irish-bred longshot Prince Bishop, owned by Hamdan bin Mohammed Al Maktoum of Godolphin Racing. Sherman noted that his horse ran wide on the turns but said, "He tried every inch of the way. There's nothing wrong with finishing second in this type of a race."

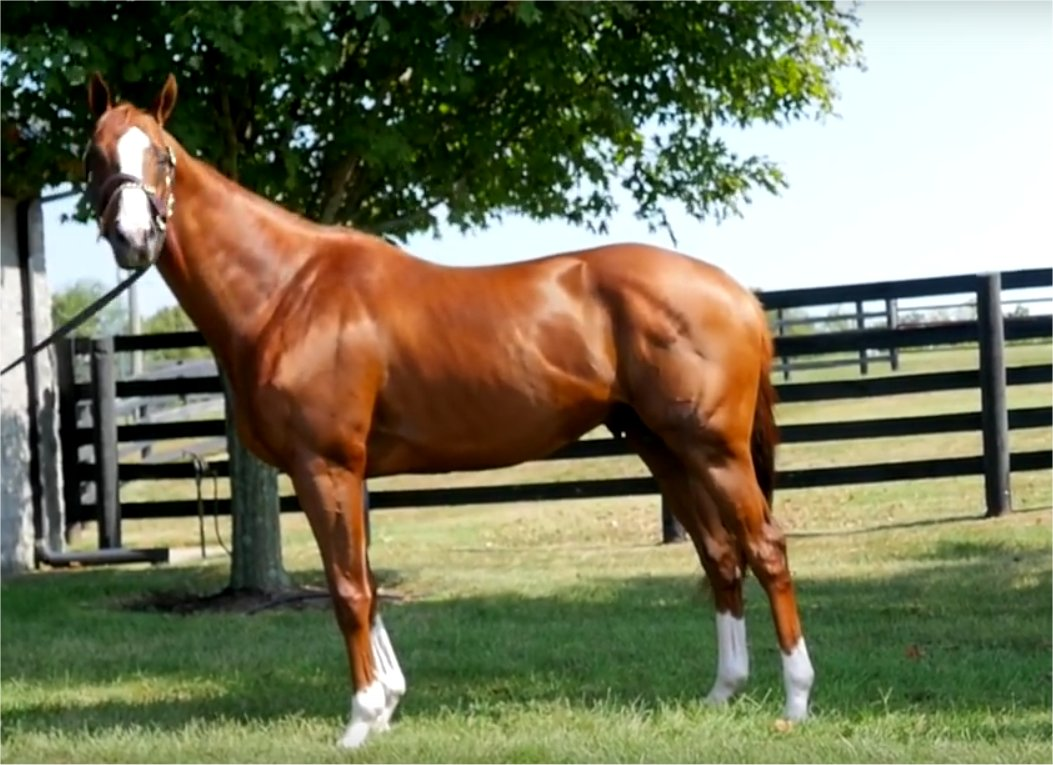
California Chrome convalesced at Taylor Made Farm in the second half of 2015.

After the Dubai World Cup, California Chrome was shipped to Rae Guest's Newmarket stables in England to prepare for Royal Ascot week in June. The decision to go to England was made by Perry Martin, against the wishes of both Coburn and Sherman. Martin explained, "I was trying to think in terms of what's best for the horse. It was my decision to send him to Newmarket. It's a beautiful place, with trees and pastures for gallops...It's good for his mind. I know Art didn't take the decision well. But he'll be okay." The horse's exercise rider in England, Robbie Mills, who was acquainted with the Shermans and advised them to stable the horse with Guest, stated that California Chrome was making a good transition from the flat dirt tracks of the United States to the undulating turf gallops of England. The horse was pointed to the Prince of Wales's Stakes at Royal Ascot, with European jockey William Buick, who rode Prince Bishop in Dubai, tapped to ride. The day before the race, the horse was scratched because of a bruised hoof that was draining pus. Guest stated, "He's been X-rayed and there's no damage." Martin wanted to run him in Chicago's Arlington Million in August, and the requirements of quarantine upon his return to the United States combined with the setback to his training foreclosed any other UK start. Upon California Chrome's return to the US in early July, a veterinary radiograph revealed that he had bruising on his cannon bones that would require at least three months to heal, effectively ending his four-year-old season. The veterinarians at Rood & Riddle Equine Hospital in Kentucky explained, "California Chrome's x-rays showed all of his joints to be remarkably clean. He has the early signs of bruising to the bottom of the cannon bones ...The return rate for horses with this problem is very high ...we found that recovery rate was 95% after giving time in the paddock to heal."

Martin originally intended for California Chrome to be retired to stud at the end of the year. But on July 15, the racing press reported that Steve Coburn sold his 30% interest in the horse to Taylor Made Farm of Nicholasville, Kentucky, and that the abrupt end to the 2015 season opened the door to racing the horse for an additional year. Duncan Taylor of Taylor Made Farms said, "You won't find many horses of his quality that made 18 starts in 23 months. He's just now getting his first break from training." On July 19, Art Sherman announced that after California Chrome had paddock rest at Taylor Made Farm, the horse would ship back to Sherman's and prepare to race in 2016. On October 13, California Chrome returned to Sherman's barn. He finished the year being named Champion California-bred Older Male.

=== 2016: Five-year-old season and Dubai World Cup ===
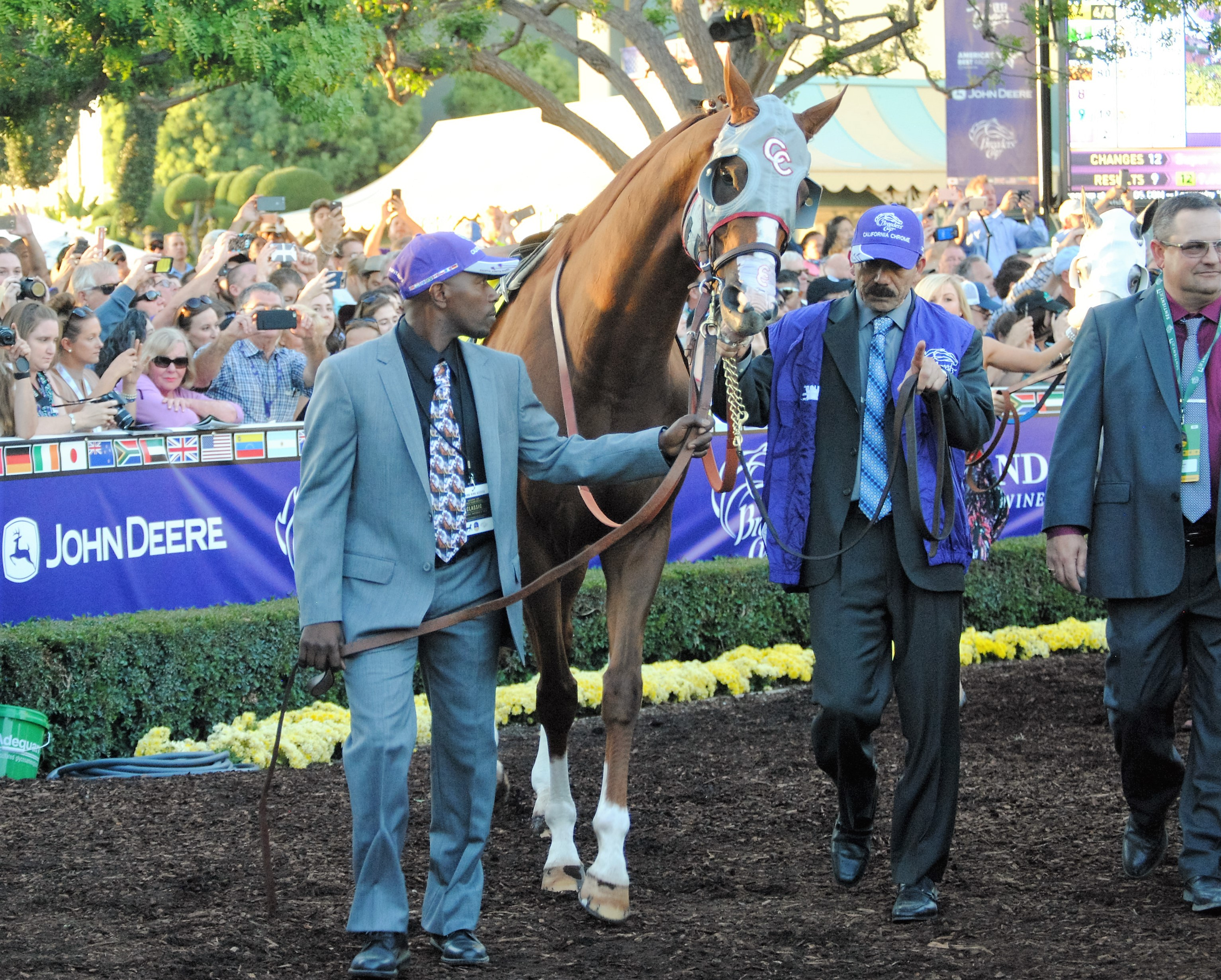
California Chrome in 2016 with new racing colors, led by exercise rider Dihigi Gladney (left) and groom Raul Rodriguez (right)

Martin's plans for the horse in 2016 included a return to the Dubai World Cup, and ultimately another try at the Breeders' Cup Classic. Sherman's barn had a new exercise rider for the horse, Dihigi Gladney, a former bull rider and ex-jockey who grew up in Watts, who also runs a pony ride concession at Santa Anita. The purple and green DAP silks were replaced with a new silver-gray design representing the California Chrome, LLC partnership that now owned the horse. Martin stated that his goal for California Chrome was to become the leading money-winning horse of all time. (Note: Cigar won $9,999,815 in his career; Curlin won $10,501,800.)

California Chrome's 2016 season began with the San Pasqual Stakes on January 9. He faced a seven-horse field that included a former rival from the Derby trail, Hoppertunity, and older foes Imperative and Hard Aces. Stalking the front runner until the final turn, he took the lead in the homestretch and won by 1 1/2 lengths. Sherman said of his modest margin of victory, "He could've opened up turning for home, but Victor put the full nelson on him. It was just what we needed." Espinoza, back on California Chrome after winning the Triple Crown with American Pharoah, said, "He's one of the best horses I've ever been on. I am so proud of him. American Pharoah and California Chrome are too hard to compare, so I won't." The win boosted his lifetime earnings to $6,442,650, breaking the previous record held by Tiznow as the highest-earning California-bred racehorse in history. He shipped to Dubai shortly after the San Pasqual to acclimate to the area, the same tactic used by the trainers of Curlin. He was entered into a 2,000 metres (6,600 ft) handicap race on February 25, where he drew the number one post position and was assigned a career-high weight of 60 kilograms (130 lb), an impost 7.5 kilograms (17 lb) more than any other horse in the eight-horse field. Alan Sherman, who accompanied the horse to Dubai and conditioned him there, was unconcerned, noting that Gladney weighed 150 pounds (68 kg). He handily won by two lengths.

Entering the 2016 Dubai World Cup, California Chrome had the number 11 post position in an international field of 12. He faced both old American rivals in Hoppertunity and Candy Boy as well as three younger horses who had challenged American Pharoah the previous year: Keen Ice, Frosted, and Mubtaahij. He also was again required to run without Lasix. The horse stayed wide and had a clear trip the entire race, took the lead 300 metres (980 ft) out and won by 3 3/4 lengths. The race developed added drama when Espinoza's saddle began to slip backwards in the homestretch. After the race he said, "I just kept looking forward and thinking 'where's the wire? It was not coming fast enough." The purse money for the victory put him past Curlin as the all-time leading North American horse in earnings won.

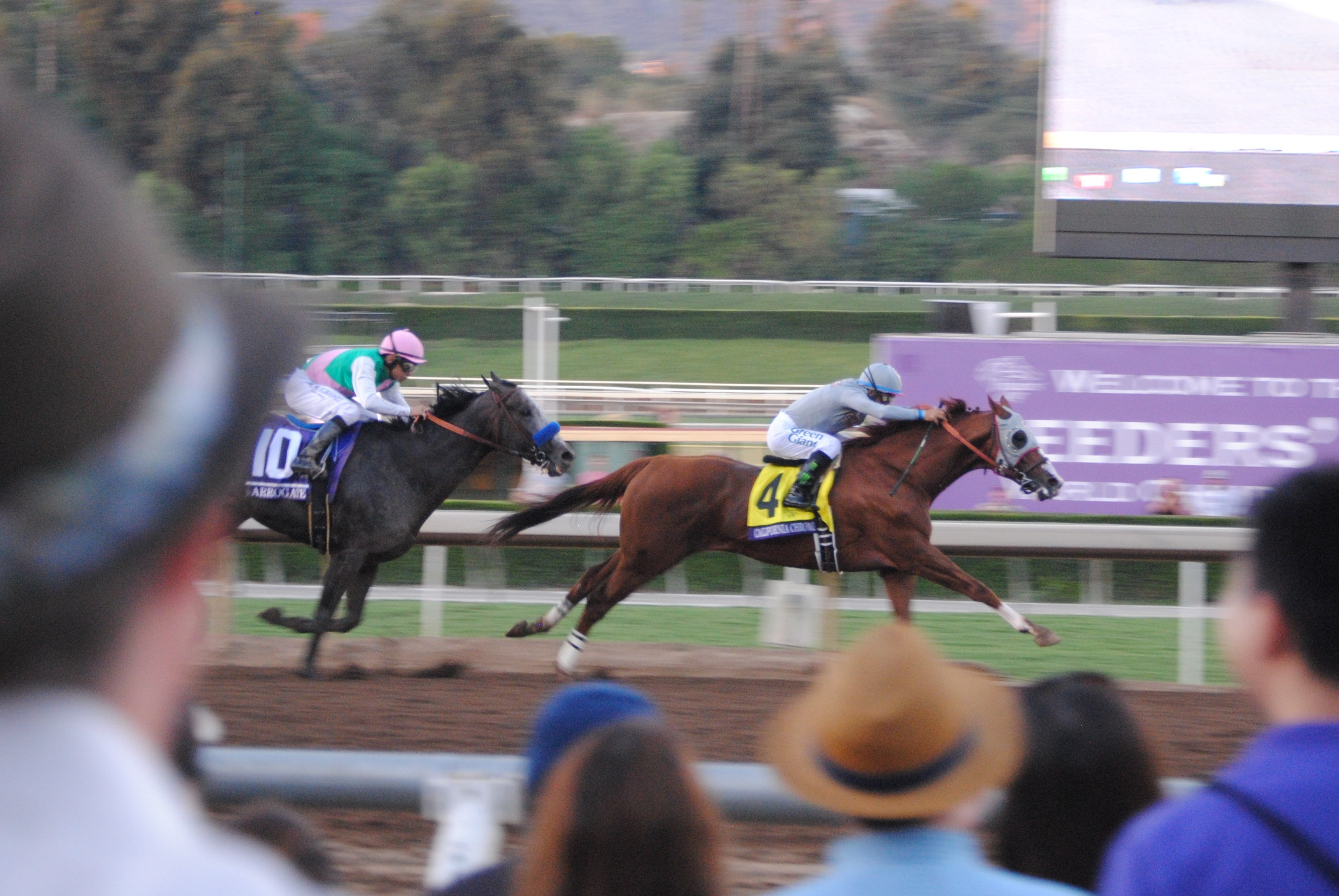
Arrogate (#10) challenged California Chrome (#4) in the stretch of the Breeders' Cup Classic and overtook him in the final yards

Upon his return to the United States, California Chrome was turned out for a month at Taylor Made Farm, then resumed training with Sherman. On July 23, the horse was entered in the San Diego Handicap where he faced Dortmund, who had finished third in the 2015 Kentucky Derby to American Pharoah. California Chrome tracked behind Dortmund until the far turn, then moved to the front. Dortmund fought back and the two dueled down the stretch, with California Chrome prevailing by half a length while carrying five pounds more than Dortmund. A month later, California Chrome challenged an all-star field in the Pacific Classic, which included a rematch with Dortmund as well as long-time rival Hoppertunity. Most notably, Chrome met the champion mare Beholder for the first time. Beholder, third favorite on the morning line, had won the previous year in her debut against male horses, the only female horse to have ever won that race. California Chrome got the number one post position in the nine-horse field, viewed as an unfavorable draw because, other than his prep race win at Meydan Racecourse, he previously did poorly on the rail. The post position turned out not to be a problem, as the horse broke cleanly and quickly went to the lead, led throughout the entire race, and only Beholder kept close to him until the mile pole, at which point he pulled ahead of the field and won by five lengths. Espinoza kept a relatively firm hold on the horse throughout the race, and Beholder's rider, Gary Stevens, commented, "Victor was playing with us. I don't think he really let him run. That's scary to think about." In similar form, he again was challenged by Dortmund in the Awesome Again Stakes on October 1. The two horses at one point outdistanced the rest of the field by 12 lengths, but California Chrome led throughout and won by 2 1/4 lengths. Art Sherman commented, "You're looking at maybe the best horse in the world right now."

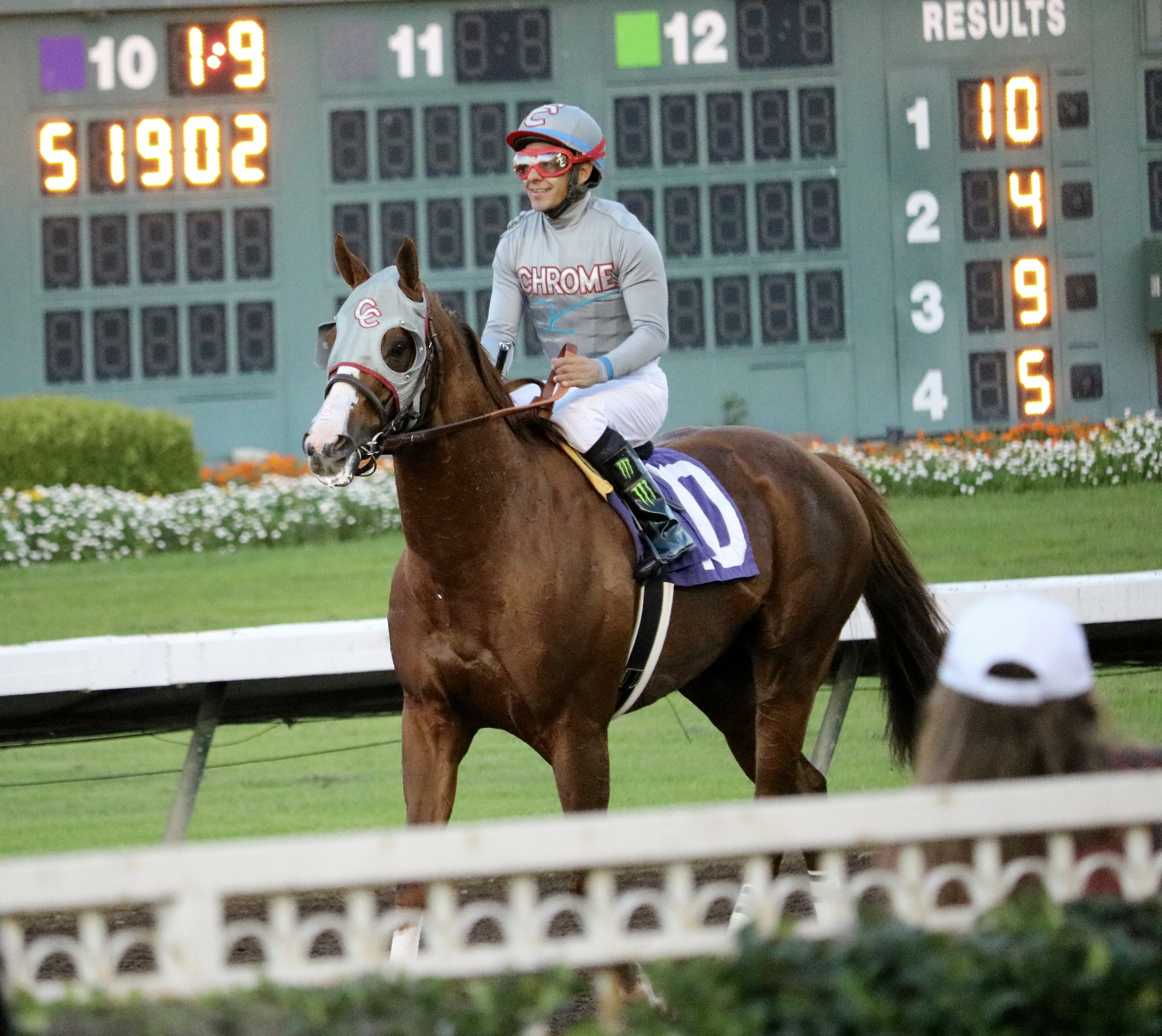
California Chrome following his win in the Winter Challenge

On November 5, California Chrome entered the Breeders' Cup Classic as a strong favorite over Travers Stakes winner Arrogate. Chrome led from the outset, tracked by Arrogate. The two horses engaged in the homestretch and in the final yards, Arrogate surged ahead to defeat California Chrome by a neck at the finish. The two horses dominated the remainder of the field by over 10 lengths. Critics of the race and Espinoza himself speculated that the loss was because Espinoza had failed to make his move and establish a large enough lead earlier in the race. Sherman also wondered if Espinoza could have opened up a bigger lead, but he was unsure if it would have mattered: "That winner is the real McCoy, I knew he was the one we had to beat, but I didn't know how good he was," he said. While the horse came out of the race in good shape, the press asked Raul Rodriquez if the horse "knew" that he had lost the race, and the groom replied, "oh yeah." Post race analysis gave California Chrome a Beyer Speed Figure of 119, the highest of his career, topped by 120 for Arrogate. His final race of 2016 was the Winter Challenge Stakes at Los Alamitos, the only time the horse had ever run at the track that had been his home training base. In a race of a mile and a sixteenth against light competition, where he was as much as 6 horses wide, he won easily by 12 lengths and set a track record.

=== 2017 and retirement ===
The final race of California Chrome's career was the Pegasus World Cup in Florida on January 28, 2017. He drew the far outside post and ran a surprisingly poor race, was eased in the stretch, and finished ninth, well behind the winner, Arrogate. Arrogate's jockey, Mike Smith, commented, "Chrome just didn't fire his race today at all." Sherman commented "This was the first bad race he has run for me." The horse had fluid on his right knee after the race, and although the injury did not appear serious, Sherman theorized about the cause: "It looks like he scrambled away from there and couldn't get his footing." Arrogate's trainer, Bob Baffert, was also disappointed: "I kept waiting for the matchup with Chrome, but he just didn't bring his race today. It's too bad." Post-race radiographs showed no bone injury, but California Chrome was mildly lame. Frank Taylor explained, "We don't know if he just wrenched it or strained it, but it had a little filling, fluid and heat in it." An equine chiropractor got a small "pop" when he stretched out the horse's leg. Clinical signs of injury went down, he shipped to Taylor Made Farm the next day, and soon was allowed to go out and exercise in a paddock.

== Retirement and breeding career ==
Although the Pegasus World Cup was only three weeks prior to the start of the Thoroughbred industry's breeding season, Taylor Made began standing California Chrome at stud for the 2017 season. His initial stud fee was set at $40,000, making him the co-second-highest-priced new stallion for 2017. The knee injury was not viewed as a problem, and he began breeding mares soon after arriving at the farm, starting on about February 14. Mark Taylor quipped, "He's going to have like two weeks to go from the playing field to the penthouse." His book included nine mares purchased by California Chrome LLC, as well as Champagne Royale, the dam of two Grade I winners, including California Chrome's Kentucky Derby rival, Danza.

In March 2017, Taylor Made announced that they had brokered with Sullivan Bloodstock for California Chrome to shuttle for part of the year to stand at stud in Chile at the Sumaya Stud, owned by Oussama Aboughazale, who also owns an American horse farm on the former Belvedere Farm property by Paris, Kentucky. The horse shipped each July to Chile for the southern hemisphere's breeding season, then returned to the US. Staff from Taylor Made traveled with the horse and remained with him in Chile while he was there.

California Chrome's first reported foal, a colt out of the mare Pay the Man, was foaled on January 20, 2018. By 2019, he had bred a total of 473 mares and his first crop of yearlings sold at auction, the highest-priced selling for $325,000.

In November 2019, Taylor Made announced that the 50-member California Chrome syndicate agreed to sell him to the JS Company of Japan to stand at the Arrow Stud in Hokkaido. The Syndicate retained a right of first refusal and a provision that when the horse retires from stud, he will return to the US and live out the remainder of his life at Taylor Made. The Martins also intend to remain involved. Referencing an American racehorse that had a substantial impact on the Thoroughbred industry after selling to Japan, Duncan Taylor stated, "I'm hoping he's the next Sunday Silence."

California Chrome's first winner was Kentucky-bred Sunkar Time, who was exported to Russia and on July 18, 2020, won at Krasnodar Racetrack. His first North American winner was the filly Cilla, who won at Delaware Park on August 13, 2020. That same year, she placed third in the Frizette Stakes. Cilla became California Chrome's first graded stakes winner when she won the 2021 Louisiana Legends Mademoiselle Stakes at Evangeline Downs and then won the Prioress Stakes at Saratoga Race Course. Cilla was voted the 2021 Louisiana-Bred Horse of the Year and Champion Three-Year-Old Filly in 2022.

California Chrome also sired stakes winners California Angel, winner of the 2021 Jessamine Stakes at Keeneland, and California Frolic, a winner of two black-type stakes at Gulfstream Park. His son Midnight Chrome finished third in the 2021 Remsen Stakes behind future Belmont Stakes winner Mo Donegal.

In 2024 the Kazakhstan-owned Kabirkhan, who sold for US$12,000 at the 2021 Keeneland Yearling Sale, won the Group 1 Al Maktoum Challenge in Dubai, giving California Chrome his first G1 winner. On March 23, 2025, Wide Latour won the Aichi Hai, becoming the first graded winner for California Chrome in Japan.

== Awards and honors ==
California Chrome won many honors in 2014. A concurrent resolution in the California State Assembly recognized the "outstanding performance of California Chrome" and all of his connections including not only his owners and trainers, but also Willie Delgado and groom Raul Rodriguez. The resolution passed both chambers of the legislature unanimously on August 14. It was the first time that the California Legislature had honored a racehorse. The city of Fresno proclaimed October 11, 2014, as "California Chrome Day". In March 2015, the Los Angeles Sports Council ranked California Chrome's Kentucky Derby and Preakness wins third at the LA Sports Awards' Sports Moment of 2014, behind only the Los Angeles Kings Stanley Cup win and Clayton Kershaw's Cy Young and National League MVP Awards.

WHEREAS, California Chrome, a chestnut-colored horse as golden as his home state, transcended thoroughbred horse racing to become an international phenomenon not just with his brilliant speed and winning ways, but due to his heart-warming story and the people who make up his team. —Assembly Concurrent Resolution 161, California State Legislature, August 14, 2014

California Chrome won the 2014 Secretariat Vox Populi Award given each year to recognize "the horse whose popularity and racing excellence best resounded with the American public and gained recognition for Thoroughbred racing." His Kentucky Derby win was named the NTRA "Moment of the Year". At the Eclipse Awards, he was named American Horse of the Year and American Champion Three-Year-Old Male Horse. He was the second California-bred to win Horse of the Year, the first since Tiznow, the first three-year-old to be Horse of the Year since Rachel Alexandra, and the first Kentucky Derby winner since Charismatic. The California Thoroughbred Breeders' Association named him the 2014 California-bred Horse of the Year, Champion Cal-bred Three-Year-Old, and Turf Champion. Lucky Pulpit was named Champion Sire, Love the Chase was Champion Broodmare, Martin and Coburn were named Champion Breeders, and Sherman was named Trainer of the Year. In 2015, California Chrome was named Champion California-bred Older Male.

2016 saw the inauguration of the California Chrome Stakes, a 1 1/16 mile race with an introductory purse of $150,000 for three-year-olds at Los Alamitos. The track created the race in recognition of the horse being stabled there as a home base since the beginning of 2014. At the end of the season, he became a repeat winner of the Eclipse Award for Horse of the Year, becoming the first horse since John Henry to win twice in non-consecutive years. He also was named Champion Older Dirt Male. In addition, he once again won the NTRA moment of the year, this time for his 2016 Dubai World Cup win, and also won the Secretariat Vox Popili award for the second time.

== Fans and publicity ==
=== "Chromies" ===
"Everyone loves a Cinderella story, and this one was no exception. California Chrome, a proven champion and formidable competitor, reminded us that it doesn't matter from whence we came but rather how we dance when we get to the ball. Furthermore, his inspiring story and engaging popularity reached beyond the racetrack stands and into the conversation of a nation."

— Penny Chenery, announcing the 2014 Secretariat Vox Populi Award

An enthusiastic fan base supporting California Chrome became visible at the Santa Anita Derby, when someone invited the horse's supporters to join the owners in the winner's circle and over 100 people crammed into the area, including one woman dressed entirely in metallic foil. Coburn told CNN of a supporter who had a jackass tattooed on his shoulder. An unofficial Twitter account for the horse, @CalChrome, was started by a 37-year-old fan from Florida, Shawn LaFata, had over 12,000 followers by Belmont week. The New York Times noted the enthusiasm of the fans, who used the hashtag #Chromies on Twitter. LaFata believes the word "Chromies" first appeared on @CalChrome eight nights before the Kentucky Derby. The humble origins of the horse and the people around him played a role in his popularity, as did the horse's people-focused attitude. Supporters appeared to be further motivated by the continuing doubts raised by industry experts about California Chrome's ability.

The horse had nationwide appeal, but California Chrome's core fan base was centered in the Central Valley of California; the Sacramento television market ranked sixth in the nation for television viewership on Preakness day, and third in the nation on Belmont day. Prior to the Belmont, singer–songwriter team Templeton Thompson and Sam Gay wrote and recorded a song titled "Bring it on Home, Chrome" and a rap video featuring an elementary school children was released on YouTube. Even after his Belmont loss, Harris Farms fielded many calls daily from fans wanting to visit the horse while he had a break from racing in June and July 2014. In contrast to his admirers, California Chrome's image was somewhat diminished by the criticism that followed Coburn's post-Belmont comments. Additional negative press occurred when Martin turned down an offer to bring California Chrome to parade in the paddock at Del Mar on the day of the Pacific Classic. NPR's Frank Deford had little patience with the horse's story exemplifying the American dream; DeFord felt that the horse's victories would have little impact on the popularity of horse racing, which he viewed as "a sport that is struggling against time and culture" due to the prevalence of other types of gambling and the reduced impact of horses in the daily lives of most people.

Overall, the press the horse received was viewed as giving a needed boost to the sport. Jockey and sports analyst Gary Stevens noted prior to the Belmont, "I haven't heard Thoroughbred horse racing mentioned on CNN for a long time, and it was right at the top of the hour ... He's brought us mainstream again for the first time in a lot of years." Post-Belmont press analysis contended that California Chrome was the most popular Thoroughbred in America since Zenyatta. In December, when the horse was selected as the winner of the Secretariat Vox Populi Award, Coburn said, "We have always said Chrome is the 'People's Horse' and we are thrilled that the public feels the same way we do about him." In announcing the Moment of the Year, Keith Chamblin of NTRA stated, "the fans reminded us that nothing trumps an awesome performance by a legendary horse." When the horse won the 2016 Vox Populi award, Perry Martin said, "I'm proud to witness the love and devotion of Chrome's fans. They've always seen what I've seen in him."

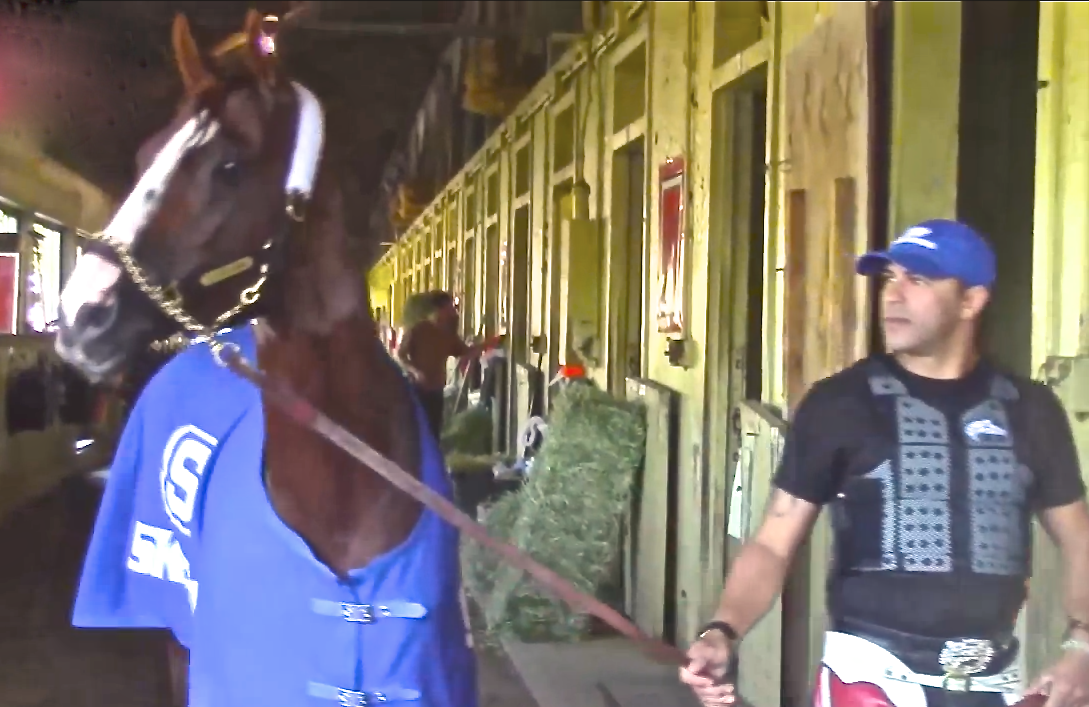
California Chrome and Willie Delgado wearing blue Skechers gear in the stables at Belmont Park, June 2014

=== Marketing ===
Prior to the 2014 Belmont Stakes, California Chrome's owners filed a patent application to trademark his name for use on athletic apparel, and hired two talent agencies to help with marketing and sponsorships. Following the "nasalgate" story, fans began to appear wearing human nasal strips or purple band-aids across their noses. Working with the intellectual property attorney who had brokered deals for Smarty Jones, California Chrome's owners gained an endorsement deal with GlaxoSmithKline, manufacturer of the human Breathe Right nasal strips. On Belmont day, GlaxoSmithKline gave away 50,000 of the strips at Belmont Park. Santa Anita, which simulcast the race, ran its own promotion, giving fans at that track purple nasal strips with the word "Chrome" on the front. On June 2, the Skechers shoe company announced a sponsorship deal where the company's logo appeared on assorted items worn by the horse and his handlers, the company used California Chrome's image in its marketing, and ran a half page ad featuring the horse in The Wall Street Journal at the end of June 2014.

== Statistics ==
Date	Age	Distance *	Race	Grade	Track	Odds	Time	Field	Finish	Margin	Jockey	Trainer	Owner	Ref
Apr 26, 2013	2	4 1/2 furlongs	Maiden Special Weight	Maiden	Hollywood Park	6.90	0:52:47	9	2	1 length	Alberto Delgado	Art Sherman	Martin & Coburn	
May 17, 2013	2	4 1/2 furlongs	Maiden Special Weight	Maiden	Hollywood Park	1.20	0:52:42	9	1	2 3/4 lengths	Alberto Delgado	Art Sherman	Martin & Coburn	
Jun 15, 2013	2	5 1/2 furlongs	Willard L. Proctor Memorial Stakes	Listed Stakes	Hollywood Park	5.10	NA	9	5	NA	Corey Nakatani	Art Sherman	Martin & Coburn	
Jul 31, 2013	2	5 1/2 furlongs	Graduation Stakes	Listed Stakes	Del Mar racetrack	6.20	1:03:48	7	1	2 3/4 lengths	Alberto Delgado	Art Sherman	Martin & Coburn	
Sep 4, 2013	2	7 furlongs	Del Mar Futurity	I	Del Mar racetrack	5.70	NA	11	6	NA	Alberto Delgado	Art Sherman	Martin & Coburn	
Nov 1, 2013	2	8 furlongs	Golden State Juvenile Stakes	Listed Stakes	Santa Anita Park	3.20	NA	9	6	NA	Alberto Delgado	Art Sherman	Martin & Coburn	
Dec 22, 2013	2	7 furlongs	King Glorious Stakes	Listed Stakes	Hollywood Park	2.20	1:22:12	10	1	6 1/4 lengths	Victor Espinoza	Art Sherman	Martin & Coburn	
Jan 25, 2014	3	8 1/2 furlongs	California Cup Derby	Listed Stakes	Santa Anita Park	2.50	1:43:22	10	1	5 1/2 lengths	Victor Espinoza	Art Sherman	Martin & Coburn	
Mar 8, 2014	3	8 1/2 furlongs	San Felipe Stakes	II	Santa Anita Park	1.40	1:40:59	7	1	7 1/2 lengths	Victor Espinoza	Art Sherman	Martin & Coburn	
Apr 5, 2014	3	9 furlongs	Santa Anita Derby	I	Santa Anita Park	0.70	1:47:52	8	1	5 1/4 lengths	Victor Espinoza	Art Sherman	Martin & Coburn	
May 3, 2014	3	10 furlongs	Kentucky Derby	I	Churchill Downs	2.50	2:03:66	19	1	1 3/4 lengths	Victor Espinoza	Art Sherman	Martin & Coburn	
May 17, 2014	3	9 1/2 furlongs	Preakness Stakes	I	Pimlico	0.50	1:54.84	10	1	1 1/2 lengths	Victor Espinoza	Art Sherman	Martin & Coburn	
Jun 7, 2014	3	12 furlongs	Belmont Stakes	I	Belmont Park	0.85	NA	11	4 (dead heat)	NA	Victor Espinoza	Art Sherman	Martin & Coburn	
Sep 20, 2014	3	9 furlongs	Pennsylvania Derby	II	Parx Racing	0.90	NA	8	6	NA	Victor Espinoza	Art Sherman	Martin & Coburn	
Nov 1, 2014	3	10 furlongs	Breeders' Cup Classic	I	Santa Anita Park	4.40	1:59:88	14	3	NA	Victor Espinoza	Art Sherman	Martin & Coburn	
Nov 29, 2014	3	9 furlongs	Hollywood Derby	I	Del Mar racetrack	0.70	1:47:88	6	1	2 lengths	Victor Espinoza	Art Sherman	Martin & Coburn	
Feb 7, 2015	4	9 furlongs	San Antonio Stakes	II	Santa Anita Park	1.40	NA	8	2	1 1/2 lengths	Victor Espinoza	Art Sherman	Martin & Coburn	
Mar 28, 2015	4	2,000 meters (1 1/4 mi) (≈10 furlongs)	Dubai World Cup	I	Meydan Racecourse	2.25	2:03:24	9	2	2 3/4 lengths	Victor Espinoza	Art Sherman	Martin & Coburn	
Jan 9, 2016	5	8 1/2 furlongs	San Pasqual Handicap	II	Santa Anita Park	0.60	1:43.39	7	1	1 1/4 lengths	Victor Espinoza	Art Sherman	California Chrome LLC	
Feb 25, 2016	5	2,000 meters (1 1/4 mi) (≈10 furlongs)	Trans Gulf Electromechanical Trophy	Handicap	Meydan Racecourse	1/9	2:04:24	8	1	2 lengths	Victor Espinoza	Art Sherman	California Chrome LLC	
Mar 26, 2016	5	2,000 meters (1 1/4 mi) (≈10 furlongs)	Dubai World Cup	I	Meydan Racecourse	6/5	2:01:83	12	1	3 3/4 lengths	Victor Espinoza	Art Sherman	California Chrome LLC	
Jul 23, 2016	5	8 1/2 furlongs	San Diego Handicap	II	Del Mar Racetrack	0.80	1:40.84	5	1	1/2 length	Victor Espinoza	Art Sherman	California Chrome LLC	
Aug 20, 2016	5	10 furlongs	Pacific Classic Stakes	I	Del Mar	1.10	2:00.13	9	1	5 lengths	Victor Espinoza	Art Sherman	California Chrome LLC	
Oct 1, 2016	5	9 furlongs	Awesome Again Stakes	I	Santa Anita Park	0.40	1:48.07	5	1	2 1/4 lengths	Victor Espinoza	Art Sherman	California Chrome LLC	
Nov 5, 2016	5	10 furlongs	Breeders' Cup Classic	I	Santa Anita Park	0.90	2:00.11	9	2	neck	Victor Espinoza	Art Sherman	California Chrome LLC	
Dec 17, 2016	5	8.5 furlongs	Winter Challenge Classic	Listed Stakes	Los Alamitos Race Course	0.05	1:40.03	10	1	12 lengths	Victor Espinoza	Art Sherman	California Chrome LLC	
Jan 28, 2017	6	9 furlongs	Pegasus World Cup	I	Gulfstream Park	1.20	NA	12	9	NA	Victor Espinoza	Art Sherman	California Chrome LLC	

*Odds not available

* Conversion of race distances
furlongs	miles	meters
4 1/2	9/16	905
5 1/2	11/16	1,106
7	7/8	1,408
8	1	1,609
8 1/2	1 1/16	1,710
9	1 1/8	1,811
9 1/2	1 3/16	1,911
10	1 1/4	2,012
12	1 1/2	2,414

== Pedigree analysis ==
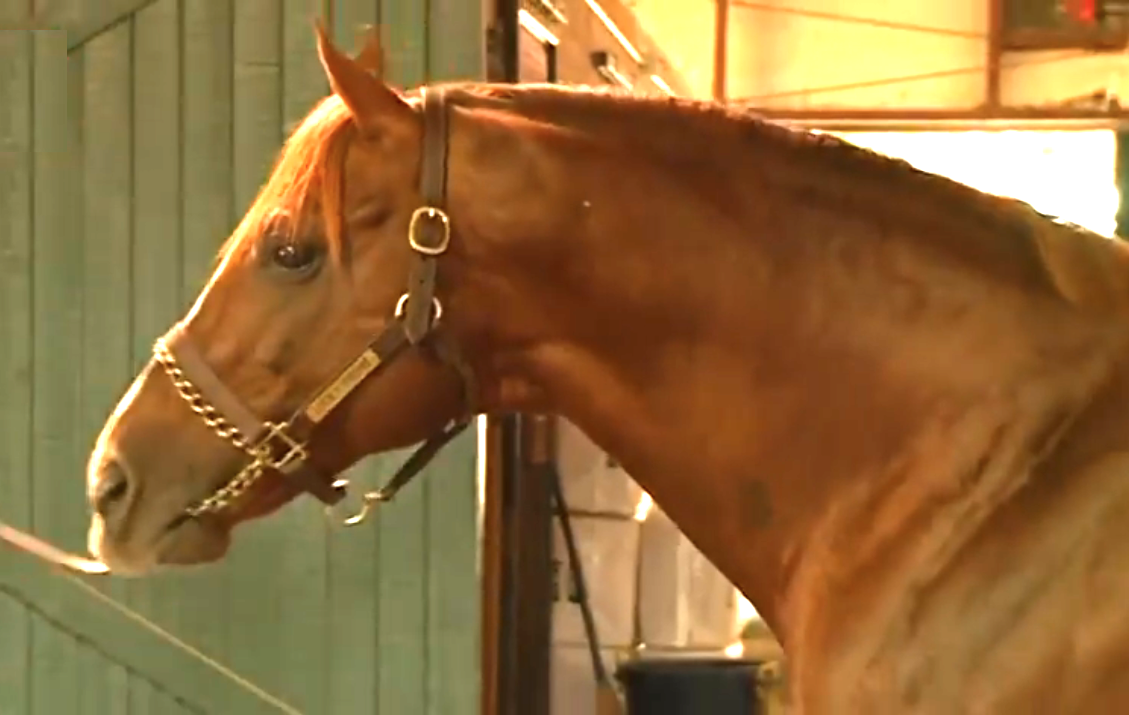
Lucky Pulpit, 2014

California Chrome has been described as a throwback to horses with toughness and soundness. His sire, Lucky Pulpit, and his dam, Love the Chase, each had relatively undistinguished racing careers, but their ancestors were successful on the track, and some were well known for stamina over distance. Lucky Pulpit was sired by Pulpit, who is credited with 63 stakes winners and particularly known for his son Tapit. 1992 Belmont Stakes and Breeders' Cup Classic winner A. P. Indy is the sire of Pulpit, and in 2015, California Chrome became the all-time leading earner from the A. P. Indy sire line. The sire line of these stallions traces to Bold Ruler, considered one of the greatest North American sires of the 20th century, and ultimately to the Darley Arabian through Eclipse. A. P. Indy was by 1977 Triple Crown winner Seattle Slew, and is a grandson of Secretariat on his dam's side, bringing a second cross to Bold Ruler into the pedigree. Pulpit is a grandson of Mr. Prospector on his dam's side, a line believed to cross well with Seattle Slew's breeding. Pulpit's maternal granddam, Narrate, carries lines to Bold Ruler and to 1964 Kentucky Derby winner Northern Dancer. Lucky Pulpit's dam, Lucky Soph, is a half-sister to the dam of Unbridled's Song and also a granddaughter of Caro, who sired 1988 Kentucky Derby winner Winning Colors. Princequillo, who was noted for his stamina, appears several times in Lucky Pulpit's pedigree.

Love the Chase comes from old and respected stock, and California Chrome was the fifth Kentucky Derby winner produced from this mare line. Her sire, Not for Love, was by Mr. Prospector and out of a daughter of Northern Dancer. Northern Dancer appears again on the distaff side of Love the Chase's pedigree. Her granddam, Chase the Dream, was sired by the 1968 Epsom Derby winner Sir Ivor. Vaguely Noble, winner of the 1968 Prix de l'Arc de Triomphe, is one of Chase the Dream's grandsires. She traces to Princequillo and to the UK-bred Ribot, viewed by some as the greatest racehorse of his generation. Love the Chase has two crosses to the mare Numbered Account, who produced several Grade I stakes winners and was the American Champion Two-Year-Old Filly in 1971. Numbered Account was a daughter of Buckpasser, who earned five Eclipse Awards between 1965 and 1967, and was inducted to the Horse Racing Hall of Fame in 1970. The Buckpasser line has been considered another good bloodline to crossbreed with descendants of Seattle Slew. Numbered Account was also a granddaughter of Swaps, and traces to La Troienne and War Admiral on both sides of her pedigree. Love the Chase's tail-female line is one of the oldest in North America. Through a mare named Selima, foaled in 1745, who was by the Godolphin Arabian and imported to the Province of Maryland between 1750 and 1752. The line probably traces to Thoroughbred family 21, which began with the Moonah Barb Mare, who was imported from Barbary to England in utero about 1700.

California Chrome has relatively little inbreeding; he is 4 × 3 to Mr Prospector, meaning that this ancestor appears once in the third and once in the fourth generations of his pedigree. He is also 4 × 4 to Numbered Account and 4 × 5 to Northern Dancer.

Pedigree of California Chrome, chestnut colt, 2011
Sire Lucky Pulpit (US) 2001	Pulpit (US); 1994	A.P. Indy	Seattle Slew
Sire Lucky Pulpit (US) 2001	Pulpit (US); 1994	A.P. Indy	Weekend Surprise
Sire Lucky Pulpit (US) 2001	Pulpit (US); 1994	Preach	Mr Prospector*
Sire Lucky Pulpit (US) 2001	Pulpit (US); 1994	Preach	Narrate
Sire Lucky Pulpit (US) 2001	Lucky Soph (US); 1992	Cozzene	Caro
Sire Lucky Pulpit (US) 2001	Lucky Soph (US); 1992	Cozzene	Ride The Trails
Sire Lucky Pulpit (US) 2001	Lucky Soph (US); 1992	Lucky Spell	Lucky Mel
Sire Lucky Pulpit (US) 2001	Lucky Soph (US); 1992	Lucky Spell	Incantation
Dam Love the Chase (US) 2006	Not For Love (US); 1990	Mr Prospector*	Raise a Native
Dam Love the Chase (US) 2006	Not For Love (US); 1990	Mr Prospector*	Gold Digger
Dam Love the Chase (US) 2006	Not For Love (US); 1990	Dance Number	Northern Dancer
Dam Love the Chase (US) 2006	Not For Love (US); 1990	Dance Number	Numbered Account*
Dam Love the Chase (US) 2006	Chase It Down (US); 1997	Polish Numbers	Danzig
Dam Love the Chase (US) 2006	Chase It Down (US); 1997	Polish Numbers	Numbered Account*
Dam Love the Chase (US) 2006	Chase It Down (US); 1997	Chase The Dream	Sir Ivor
Dam Love the Chase (US) 2006	Chase It Down (US); 1997	Chase The Dream	La Belle Fleur (Family A4)

- California Chrome is inbred 4s × 3d to the stallion Mr Prospector, meaning that he appears fourth generation on the sire side of his pedigree and third generation on the dam side of his pedigree. California Chrome is also inbred 4d × 4d to Numbered Account, meaning he appears fourth generation twice on the dam side of the pedigree.

== See also ==
- List of racehorses

== Sources ==
- Baffert Done Challenging California Chrome (online video). HRTV. May 17, 2014. Archived from the original on May 19, 2014.
- Drape, Joe (2002). The Race for the Triple Crown: Horses, High Stakes, and Eternal Hope (reprint ed.). Grove Press. ISBN 978-0-8021-9645-3.
- Espinoza Has Great rapport With California Chrome (online video). HRTV.com. March 9, 2014. Archived from the original on May 19, 2014.
- It's Not Crazy, It's Sports: 'Chrome' (online video). ESPN films. March 6, 2015.
- HRTV Presents California Chrome (online video). HRTV. June 1, 2014. Archived from the original on June 6, 2014.
- Kentucky Derby 140: Ep. 5 – 3 yr. old takes 76 yr. old to the Kentucky Derby (online video). Kentuckyderby.com. December 29, 2013. Archived from the original on April 13, 2014.
- Penna, Mike (April 5, 2014). Alan Sherman Interview – April 5, 2014 (podcast). Horse Racing Radio Network (HRRN). Archived from the original on September 21, 2015.
