= California Cup Derby =

Annual American horse race

- Class: Restricted Stakes
- Location: Santa Anita Park, Arcadia, California; United States
- Inaugurated: 2014
- Race type: Thoroughbred - Flat racing
- Website: www.pegasusworldcup.com

Race information
- Distance: 1 1/16 Miles (8.5 Furlongs)
- Surface: Dirt
- Track: Left-handed
- Qualification: 3-year-old
- Weight: Assigned
- Purse: $175,000

The California Cup Derby is an American Thoroughbred horse race held annually since 2014 at Santa Anita Park in Arcadia, California run at a distance of 1 1/16 miles on a dirt track it. The race is one of the track’s annual California Cup Day series of races that form part of the day’s regular Racecard. Each of the races have varied conditions with the exception that all are restricted to horses bred in the state of California or were sired by a horse that had competed on California racetracks.

== Records ==
Speed record:

- 1:43.22 – California Chrome (2014)

Most wins by a jockey:

- 2 - Victor Espinoza (2014, 2016)
- 2 - Tiago J. Pereira (2020, 2025)
- 2 - Juan J. Hernandez (2021, 2023)

Most wins by a trainer:

- 2 - Steve R. Knapp (2024, 2025)

Most wins by an owner:

- No owner won this race more than once.

== Winners ==
Year	Winner	Jockey	Trainer	Owner	Dist. (miles)	Time	Win $
2014	California Chrome	Victor Espinoza	Arthur Sherman	Perry Martin & Steve Coburn	1 1/16 M	1:43.22	$140,000
2015	Mischief Clem	Kent Desormeaux	Robert B. Hess Jr.	Griffin Thoroughbred Stables (Craig & Lorie Griffin)	1 1/16 M	1:44.82	$137,500
2016	Smokey Image	Victor Espinoza	Carla Gaines	Irvin Racing Stable (Betty & Diane Irvin)	1 1/16 M	1:43.49	$137,500
2017	Ann Arbor Eddie	Mario Gutierrez	Douglas F. O'Neill	Paul & Zillah Reddam	1 1/16 M	1:44.65	$137,500
2018	Heck Yeah	Mike E. Smith	Robert A. Baffert	Robert Baedeker, Michael Pageler, Michael Sigband	1 1/16 M	1:46.60	$110,000
2019	Galilean	Flavien Prat	Jerry Hollendorfer	West Point Thoroughbreds Inc., Denise Barker, William Sandbrook	1 1/16 M	1:43.43	$110,000
2020	Fast Enough	Tiago J. Pereira	Rafael Becerra	Craig Martin	1 1/16 M	1:45.23	$200,000
2021	Big Fish	Juan J. Hernandez	David Hofmans	Legacy Ranch Inc.	1 1/16 M	1:46.37	$110,000
2022	Fast Drawings Munnings	Drayden Van Dyke	Jeffrey L. Mullins	Emily Shields	1 1/16 M	1:46.99	$110,000
2023	Thirsty John	Juan J. Hernandez	Peter L. Miller	Terry C. Lovinger, Tom London, Eugene Zondlo	1 1/16 M	1:45.51	$110,000
2024	Micis Express	Umberto Rispoli	Steve R. Knapp	Tom Halasz	1 1/16 M	1:46.75	$110,000
2025	Whiskyginandbrandy	Tiago J. Pereira	Steve R. Knapp	Anthony J. Chacon, Victor M. Flores, Terry C. Lovingier	1 1/16 M	1:46.12	$96,250
