= Paddock =

Small enclosure for horses

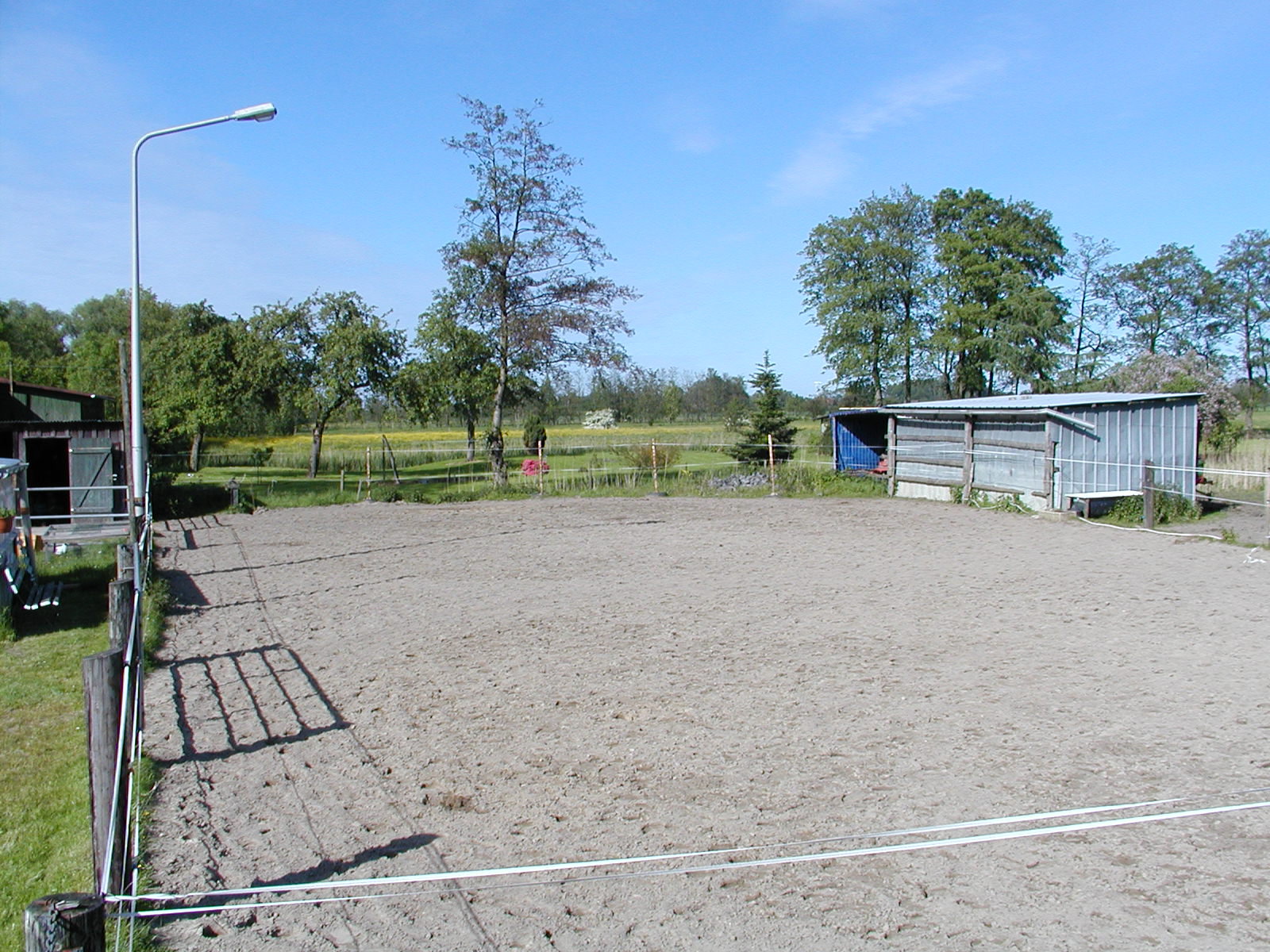
A sand paddock

A paddock is a small enclosure for horses. This term also applies to a trackside area for a motor racing competition, particularly Formula One, and is synonymous with the competing field.

== Description ==
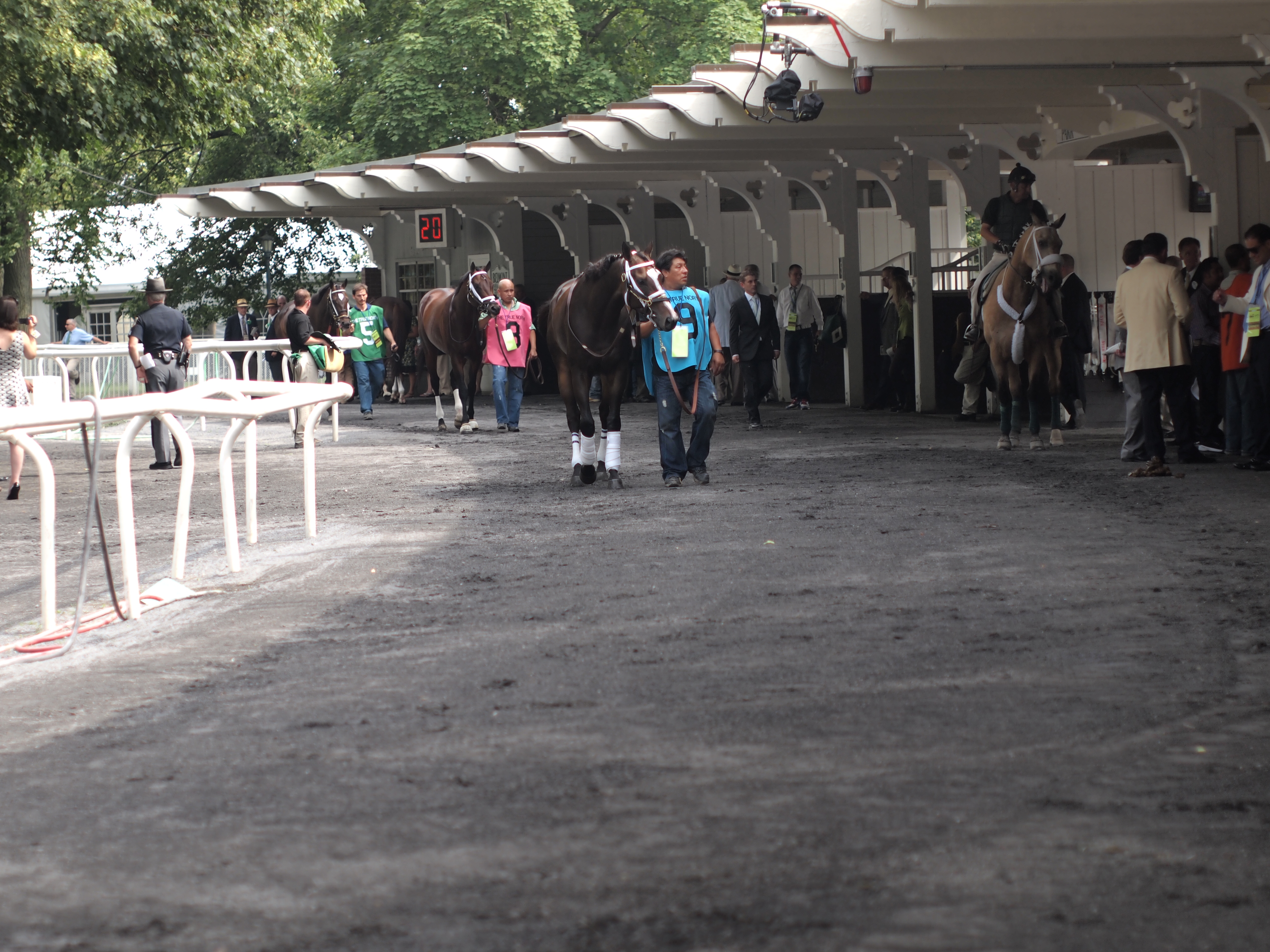
The saddling paddock at Belmont Park

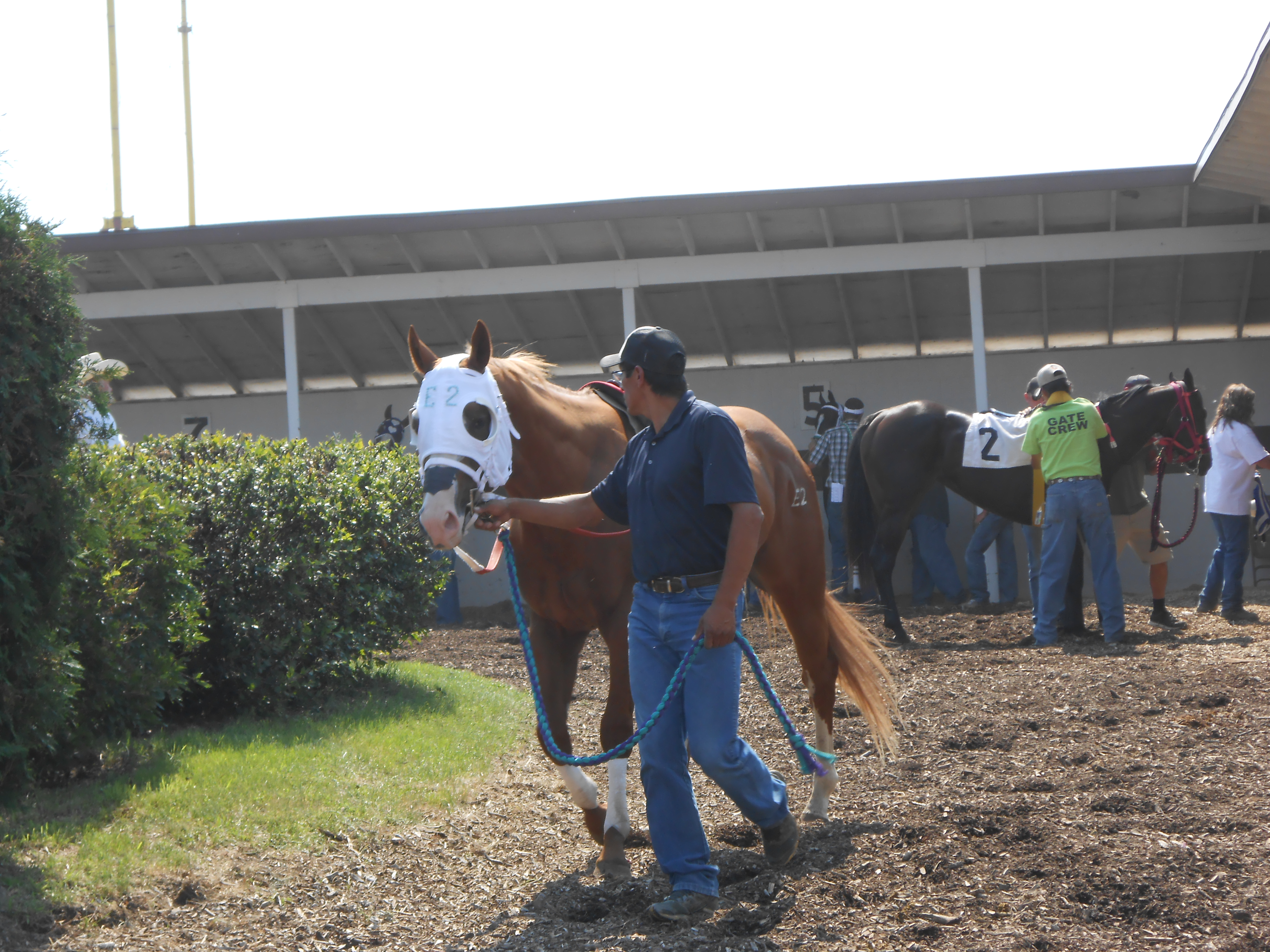
A saddling paddock at a racetrack

The most common design provides an area for exercise and is often situated near the stables. Larger paddocks may have grass maintained in them, but many are dirt or a similar natural surface. In those cases drainage and a top layer of sand are often used to keep a suitable surface in the paddock.

In the American West, such an enclosure is often called a corral, and may be used to contain cattle or horses, occasionally other livestock. The word paddock is also used to describe other small, fenced areas that hold horses, such as a saddling paddock at a racetrack, the area where race horses are saddled before a horse race.

Horse breeders may let stallions loose in a paddock or field with mares that they would like the stallion to impregnate. This allows the most natural form of mating to occur and the regularity of mating using this method promotes the chances of a mare becoming pregnant. However, high-value stallions are rarely used for breeding in this manner, as uninterested mares may severely injure them.

In Australia and New Zealand the word paddock is used instead of field to describe a section of farmland, regardless of size.
