= Goldikova Stakes =

- Class: Grade III
- Location: Santa Anita Park; Arcadia, California, USA
- Inaugurated: 1969 (as Las Palmas Handicap at Santa Anita Park)
- Race type: Thoroughbred - Flat racing
- Website: Del Mar

Race information
- Distance: 1 mile
- Surface: Turf
- Track: Left-handed
- Qualification: Filles & Mares, three-years-old and older
- Weight: Base weights with allowances: 4-year-olds and up: 125 lbs. 3-year-olds: 122 lbs.
- Purse: $300,000 (since 2024)

The Goldikova Stakes is a Grade III American Thoroughbred horse race for fillies and mares age three years old or older over the distance of one mile on the turf scheduled annually in November at Santa Anita Park, Arcadia, California. The event currently carries a purse of $300,000.

== History ==
The event was inaugurated on 13 October 1969 as the Las Palmas Handicap at the Oak Tree Racing Association meeting at Santa Anita Park over a distance of 1 1/16 miles on the dirt and was won easily by the 9/5 favourite Manta with a margin of five lengths. The Las Palmas Handicap was named for the California-bred racing mare, Las Palmas. Foaled in 1929, she won the first ever race at the modern Santa Anita Park on Tuesday, 25 December 1934.

The following year the event was increased to 1 1/8 miles and moved to the turf track with Manta winning the event for the second time.

When the grading of races began as a Thoroughbred Owners and Breeders Association project in 1973 the event was classified as Grade III. In 1983 the event was upgraded to Grade II.

In 2012 the event was renamed to the Goldikova Stakes in honor of Goldikova, the champion Irish bred mare who won the Breeders' Cup Mile three times in succession - 2008, 2009 and 2010. That same year the event was shortened to the one mile distance.

In 2024 the event was downgraded by the Thoroughbred Owners and Breeders Association to Grade III status.

The event has been scheduled at times during the Breeders' Cup. In 2017, 2021, 2024 the event was moved to Del Mar.

== Records ==
Time record:

- 1 mile: 1:33.33 – Beautyandthebeast (GB) (2006)
- 1 1/8 miles: 1:43.92 – Kostroma (IRE) (1991)

Margins:

- 6 lengths - Typecast (1971)

Most wins:

- 2 - Manta (1969, 1970)
- 2 - Ack's Secret (1980, 1981)
- 2 - Going Global (IRE) (2021, 2022)

Most wins by an owner:

- 4 - Juddmonte Farms (1992, 1996, 2002, 2014)

Most wins by a jockey:

- 4 – Kent J. Desormeaux (1991, 1992, 1994, 2015)

Most wins by a trainer:

- 5 – Charles E. Whittingham (1976, 1977, 1983, 1985, 1994)

== Winners ==
Year	Winner	Age	Jockey	Trainer	Owner	Distance	Time	Purse	Grade	Ref
At Santa Anita - Goldikova Stakes
2026	Little Jamie	5	Tiago Josue Pereira	Saffie A. Joseph Jr.	J and J Stables (Williams Jr.)	1 mile	1:34.09	$100,000	III	
At Del Mar
2025	Special Wan (IRE)	5	Joel Rosario	Brendan P. Walsh	Team Valor International & Steven Rocco	1 mile	1:34.26	$303,000	III	
2024	Raqiya (IRE)	3	Frankie Dettori	Owen Burrows	Shadwell Stable	1 mile	1:36.09	$302,500	III	
At Santa Anita
2023	Closing Remarks	4	Juan J. Hernandez	Carla Gaines	Harris Farms	1 mile	1:32.69	$200,500	II	
2022	Going Global (IRE)	4	Umberto Rispoli	Philip D'Amato	CYBT, Michael Dubb, Saul Gevertz, Michael Nentwig & Ray Pagano	1 mile	1:33.85	$200,500	II	
At Del Mar
2021	Going Global (IRE)	3	Flavien Prat	Michael J. Maker	CYBT, Michael Dubb, Saul Gevertz, Michael Nentwig & Ray Pagano	1 mile	1:34.57	$301,500	II	
At Santa Anita
2020	Maxim Rate	4	Umberto Rispoli	Simon Callaghan	Slam Dunk Racing & James D. Branham	1 mile	1:33.85	$201,000	II	
2019	Toinette	4	Flavien Prat	Neil D. Drysdale	Ken Baca, Lynne & Joseph Hudson	1 mile	1:33.38	$200,351	II	
2018	Vasilika	4	Flavien Prat	Jerry Hollendorfer	All Schlaich Stables, Jerry Hollendorfer, Gatto Racing & G. Todaro	1 mile	1:33.49	$201,035	II	
At Del Mar
2017	Kitten's Roar	5	John R. Velazquez	Michael J. Maker	Kenneth and Sarah Ramsey	1 mile	1:35.18	$203,105	II	
At Santa Anita
2016	Zindaya	5	Javier Castellano	Chad C. Brown	e Five Racing Thoroughbreds	1 mile	1:34.38	$200,690	II	
At Del Mar
2015	Uzziel	4	Kent J. Desormeaux	J. Keith Desormeaux	James W. McKenney & Tammy M. McKenney	1 mile	1:34.77	$200,250	II	
At Santa Anita
2014	Filimbi	4	Joel Rosario	William I. Mott	Juddmonte Farms	1 mile	1:34.13	$200,750	II	
2013	Egg Drop	4	Martin Garcia	Mike R. Mitchell	Little Red Feather Racing	1 mile	1:33.52	$151,000	II	
2012	Rhythm of Light (GB)	4	Garrett K. Gomez	Thomas Dascombe	Lowe Silver Deal	1 mile	1:33.42	$150,000	II	
Las Palmas Stakes
2011	All Star Heart (CAN)	4	Brice Blanc	Ron McAnally	Gerald L. Gibbs	1 mile	1:35.74	$150,000	II	
At Hollywood Park – Las Palmas Handicap
2010	Briecat	5	Pat Valenzuela	Vladimir Cerin	Holly & David Wilson	1 mile	1:34.77	$150,000	II	
At Santa Anita
2009	Tuscan Evening (IRE)	4	Rafael Bejarano	Jerry Hollendorfer	William Deburgh	1 mile	1:33.50	$200,000	II	
2008	Roshani	5	John R. Velazquez	Todd A. Pletcher	Ben McElroy	1 mile	1:34.32	$250,000	II	
2007	Naissance Royale (IRE)	5	Garrett K. Gomez	Christophe Clement	Monceaux Stable	1 mile	1:34.14	$150,000	II	
2006	Beautyandthebeast (GB)	4	Corey Nakatani	Neil D. Drysdale	Abergwaun Farm	1 mile	1:33.33	$150,000	II	
2005	Mea Domina	4	Tyler Baze	Ron McAnally	Janis R. Whitham	1 mile	1:33.80	$150,000	II	
2004	Theater R. N.	4	Rene R. Douglas	Robert J. Frankel	Pegasus Thoroughbred Training Center	1 1/8 miles	1:47.81	$150,000	II	
2003	Race not held									
2002	Tates Creek	4	Jerry D. Bailey	Robert J. Frankel	Juddmonte Farms	1 1/8 miles	1:47.69	$200,000	II	
2001	Golden Apples (IRE)	3	Garrett K. Gomez	Ben D. A. Cecil	Gary A. Tanaka	1 1/8 miles	1:46.61	$250,000	II	
2000	Smooth Player	4	Eddie Delahoussaye	Dan L. Hendricks	Martin J. Wygod & John Spohler	1 1/8 miles	1:46.99	$175,000	II	
1999	Sapphire Ring (GB)	4	Gary L. Stevens	Neil D. Drysdale	The Thoroughbred Corporation	1 1/8 miles	1:48.20	$250,000	II	
1998	Sonja's Faith (IRE)	4	Emile Ramsammy	Ian P. D. Jory	Marvin Malmuth	1 1/8 miles	1:48.92	$150,000	II	
1997	Real Connection	6	Goncalino Almeida	Melvin F. Stute	Bill M. Thomas	1 1/8 miles	1:47.60	$125,000	II	
1996	Wandesta (GB)	5	Corey Nakatani	Robert J. Frankel	Juddmonte Farms	1 1/8 miles	1:46.72	$129,700	II	
1995	Onceinabluemamoon	4	Brice Blanc	Jack Van Berg	Louis J. Roussel	1 1/8 miles	1:50.34	$132,650	II	
1994	Aube Indienne (FR)	4	Kent J. Desormeaux	Charles E. Whittingham	Frankfurt Stable	1 1/8 miles	1:49.62	$106,300	II	
1993	Miatuschka	5	Corey Black	Bruce L. Jackson	Bollinger, Ramirez, Varni, et al	1 1/8 miles	1:47.98	$100,000	II	
1992	Super Staff	4	Kent J. Desormeaux	Ron McAnally	Juddmonte Farms	1 1/8 miles	1:46.89	$134,000	II	
1991	Kostroma (IRE)	5	Kent J. Desormeaux	Gary F. Jones	William De Burgh, Prestonwood Farm & Robert Sangster	1 1/8 miles	1:43.92	$137,000	II	
1990	Little Brianne	5	Julio A. Garcia	Jack Van Berg	Robert Alick	1 1/8 miles	1:46.80	$160,700	II	
1989	Nikishka	4	Eddie Delahoussaye	Joseph H. Cannon	Aaron U. Jones	1 1/8 miles	1:46.60	$164,300	II	
1988	Annoconnor	4	Corey Black	John Gosden	Mort Fink & Roy Gottlieb	1 1/8 miles	1:47.00	$165,300	II	
1987	Autumn Glitter	4	Pat Day	Carl A. Nafzger	North Ridge Farm	1 1/8 miles	1:50.40	$154,800	II	
1986	Outstandingly	4	Gary L. Stevens	Laz Barrera	Harbor View Farm	1 1/8 miles	1:47.60	$108,400	II	
1985	Estrapade	5	Bill Shoemaker	Charles E. Whittingham	Summa Stables (Lessee)	1 1/8 miles	1:47.20	$120,850	II	
1984	Fenny Rough (IRE)	4	Kenneth D. Black	Darrell Vienna	Round Meadow Farm, Warner, et al	1 1/8 miles	1:47.40	$132,800	II	
1983	Castilla	4	Chris McCarron	Charles E. Whittingham	Mary Jones Bradley	1 1/8 miles	1:49.20	$109,300	II	
1982	Berry Bush	5	Marco Castaneda	Ron McAnally	Elmendorf Farm	1 1/8 miles	1:47.40	$115,400	III	
1981	Ack's Secret	5	Darrel McHargue	Michael C. Whittingham	E. E. Buddy Fogelson	1 1/8 miles	1:47.00	$84,250	III	
1980	Ack's Secret	4	Pat Valenzuela	Michael C. Whittingham	E. E. Buddy Fogelson	1 1/8 miles	1:46.00	$68,400	III	
1979	High Pheasant	4	Frank Olivares	William T. Canney	Lou Rowan & Wheelock Whitney	1 1/8 miles	1:54.00	$66,700	III	Off turf
1978	Grenzen	3	Laffit Pincay Jr.	Loren Rettele	Diane Delaplaine, Majorie Schaffer & Jacqueline Woolsey	1 1/8 miles	1:48.40	$66,400	III	
1977	Swingtime	5	Fernando Toro	Charles E. Whittingham	Mary Jones Bradley & Charles E. Whittingham	1 1/8 miles	1:47.20	$43,650	III	
1976	Vagabonda	5	Octavio A. Vergara	Charles E. Whittingham	Arno D. Schefler	1 1/8 miles	1:48.60	$57,000	III	
1975	Charger's Star	5	Bill Shoemaker	C. Ralph West	Granja Vista Del Rio	1 1/8 miles	1:47.20	$44,000	III	
1974	Lucky Spell	3	Jorge Tejeira	Henry Moreno	James L. Wilder & Walter Burris	1 1/8 miles	1:47.40	$44,750	III	
1973	Minstrel Miss	6	Donald Pierce	Gordon C. Campbell	Jack M. Grossman	1 1/8 miles	1:47.80	$45,100	III	
1972	Resolutely	5	Jerry Lambert	Willard L. Proctor	Glen Hill Farm	1 1/8 miles	1:47.80	$42,550		
1971	Typecast	5	Bill Shoemaker	A. Thomas Doyle	Westerly Stud	1 1/8 miles	1:49.80	$32,650		
1970	Manta	4	Rudy Rosales	Farrell W. Jones	Elmendorf Farm	1 1/8 miles	1:46.60	$32,850		
1969	Manta	3	Rudy Rosales	Farrell W. Jones	Elmendorf Farm	1 1/16 miles	1:41.80	$44,850		

Legend:
Dirt Turf

== See also ==
List of American and Canadian Graded races
