= Senator Ken Maddy Stakes =

- Class: Listed
- Location: Santa Anita Park; Arcadia, California, United States
- Inaugurated: 1969 (as Autumn Days Stakes at Santa Anita Park)
- Race type: Thoroughbred – Flat racing
- Website: Santa Anita

Race information
- Distance: about 6 1/2 furlongs
- Surface: Turf
- Track: Left-handed
- Qualification: Fillies & Mares, three-years-old and older
- Weight: Base weights with allowances: 3-year-olds: 122 lbs. 4-year-olds and older: 126 lbs.
- Purse: US$150,000 (since 2023)

The Senator Ken Maddy Stakes is a Listed American Thoroughbred horse race for fillies and mares, two years old and older over a distance of about 6 1/2 furlongs on the Downhill turf course scheduled in early November at Santa Anita Park in Arcadia, California

== History ==
The event was inaugurated on 8 October 1969, opening day of the Oak Tree Racing Association meeting at Santa Anita Park as the Autumn Days Stakes, an allowance stakes for age three and older of either sex over the Downhill turf course at a distance of about 6 1/2 furlongs. The event was the first stakes race and first turf race ever run by the Oak Tree Racing Association and was won by Elizabeth Keck's entry Tell who was ridden by US Hall of Fame jockey Bill Shoemaker defeating his stablemate Pinjara by one length in a time of 1:13 3/5. The following year, in 1970 the event was run as a handicap, Autumn Days Handicap and was won by the US Hall of Fame Champion Ack Ack who carried an imposing weight of 128 pounds as top weight to victory by 1 1/2 lengths over Fleet Surprise.

In 1971 the conditions of the event were changed to a fillies and mares race. When the grading of races began as a Thoroughbred Owners and Breeders Association project in 1973 the event was classified as Grade III. The event would hold Grade III status for one more year before being downgrade to Listed until 1998 when it again was classified as Grade III.

In 1999 the race was renamed to honor the long-serving California State Senator Kenneth L. Maddy for his support of thoroughbred racing. Senator Kenneth L. Maddy was elected into the California Racing Hall of Fame in 2007.

In 2010, Oak Tree's meeting was moved to Hollywood Park and the race was shortened to six furlongs due to Hollywood Park's course configuration. In 2017 the event was held at Del Mar Racetrack over the five furlongs distance.

The event has been run in split divisions eight times with the last such occurrence in 1986.

In 2021 the event was downgraded to a Listed event. Also the event was moved from Santa Anita and scheduled as an undercard event on the Breeders' Cup program at Del Mar Racetrack.

== Records ==
Speed record:

- 5 1/2 furlongs: 1:02.03 – Biddy Duke (2020)
- about 6 1/2 furlongs: 1:11.56 – Elusive Diva (2005)

Margins:

- 4 3/4 lengths - Palmistry (1979)

Most wins:

- 2 – Bel's Starlet (1991, 1992)
- 2 – Belleski (2003, 2004)
- 2 – Broken Dreams (2011, 2012)

Most wins by an owner:

- 7 – Ann & Jerry Moss (1984, 1985, 1987, 1996, 2001, 2003, 2004)

Most wins by a jockey:

- 6 – Kent Desormeaux (1991, 1992, 1993, 1994, 1998, 2000)

Most wins by a trainer:

- 6 – Richard E. Mandella (1982, 1991, 1992, 1996, 2001, 2015)

== Winners ==
Year	Winner	Age	Jockey	Trainer	Owner	Distance	Time	Purse	Grade	Ref
At Del Mar – Senator Ken Maddy Stakes
2025	Queen Maxima	4	Juan J. Hernandez	Jeff Mullins	Dutch Girl Holdings & Irving Ventures	5 furlongs	0:56.57	$201,000	Listed	
2024	Twirling Queen	3	Luis Saez	Jose D'Angelo	GU Racing Stable	5 furlongs	0:56.42	$201,000	Listed	
At Santa Anita
2023	Wet My Beak	4	Jose L. Ortiz	Vladimir Cerin	Thelma & Louise Stable	abt. 6 1/2 furlongs	1:12.37	$153,000	Listed	
2022	Amy C (GB)	4	Umberto Rispoli	Doug F. O'Neill	Madaket Stables, Michael Dubb, & Robert V. LaPenta,	abt. 6 1/2 furlongs	1:12.36	$102,500	Listed	
At Del Mar
2021	A.G. Indy	4	Umberto Rispoli	Doug F. O'Neill	R3 Racing	5 furlongs	0:56.71	$202,000	Listed	
At Santa Anita
2020	Biddy Duke	3	Juan J. Hernandez	Doug F. O'Neill	Joseph E. Besecker	5 1/2 furlongs	1:02.03	$101,500	III	
2019	Just Grazed Me	4	Geovanni Franco	Philip D'Amato	Nicholas B. Alexander	5 1/2 furlongs	1:02.94	$101,404	III	
2018	Storm the Hill	4	Rafael Bejarano	Philip D'Amato	Alastar Thoroughbred Company & Michael Valdes	abt. 6 1/2 furlongs	1:12.13	$101,380	III	
At Del Mar
2017	Belvoir Bay (GB)	4	Flavien Prat	Peter L. Miller	Team Valor International & Gary Barber	5 furlongs	0:56.63	$151,725	III	
At Santa Anita
2016	Fair Point	4	Jose L. Ortiz	Claude R. McGaughey III	Stuart S. Janney III	abt. 6 1/2 furlongs	1:11.75	$102,415	III	
2015	Baruta (BRZ)	6	Rafael Bejarano	Richard E. Mandella	Rio Dois Irmaos	abt. 6 1/2 furlongs	1:12.96	$100,750	III	
2014	Amaranth	3	Dennis Carr	O. J. Jauregui	Highland Yard	6 1/2 furlongs	1:16.07	$100,250	Listed	Off turf
2013	Pontchatrain	3	Gary L. Stevens	Thomas F. Proctor	Glen Hill Farm	abt. 6 1/2 furlongs	1:12.25	$101,500	III	
2012	Broken Dreams	6	Garrett K. Gomez	Thomas F. Proctor	Glen Hill Farm	abt. 6 1/2 furlongs	1:11.81	$100,000	III	
2011	Broken Dreams	5	Garrett K. Gomez	Thomas F. Proctor	Glen Hill Farm	abt. 6 1/2 furlongs	1:12.23	$100,000	III	
At Hollywood Park – Senator Ken Maddy Handicap
2010	Unzip Me	4	Rafael Bejarano	Martin F. Jones	Harris Farms, Donald Valpredo, Per Antonsen & Martin F. Jones	6 furlongs	1:08.50	$100,000	III	
At Santa Anita
2009	Gotta Have Her	5	Tyler Baze	Jenine Sahadi	Green Lantern Stables	abt. 6 1/2 furlongs	1:12.09	$100,000	III	
2008	Queen of the Castle	4	Mike E. Smith	Howard L. Zucker	Carl T. Grether	abt. 6 1/2 furlongs	1:12.84	$111,600	III	
2007	Dancing Edie	5	Corey Nakatani	Craig Dollase	Julian Basin, Fast Lane Farms & J. Paul Reddam	abt. 6 1/2 furlongs	1:13.30	$114,900	III	
2006	Cambiocorsa	5	Jon Court	Doug F. O'Neill	Leatherman Racing & Ran Jan Racin	abt. 6 1/2 furlongs	1:12.02	$100,000	III	
2005	Elusive Diva	4	Pat Valenzuela	Mark Glatt	Branch & Konecny, et al.	abt. 6 1/2 furlongs	1:11.56	$100,000	III	
2004	Belleski	5	Corey Nakatani	John W. Sadler	Ann & Jerry Moss	abt. 6 1/2 furlongs	1:12.86	$100,000	III	
2003	Belleski	4	Victor Espinoza	John W. Sadler	Ann & Jerry Moss	abt. 6 1/2 furlongs	1:12.37	$112,000	III	
2002	Rolly Polly (IRE)	4	Pat Valenzuela	Robert J. Frankel	Wildenstein Stable	abt. 6 1/2 furlongs	1:12.86	$114,100	III	
2001	A La Reine	4	Alex O. Solis	Richard E. Mandella	Ann & Jerry Moss	abt. 6 1/2 furlongs	1:13.27	$110,400	III	
2000	Evening Promise (GB)	4	Kent J. Desormeaux	Kathy Walsh	Richard Duggan & James R. Vreelan	abt. 6 1/2 furlongs	1:13.05	$111,700	III	
1999	Hula Queen	5	Alex O. Solis	Luis E. Seglin	Firmamento Corp	abt. 6 1/2 furlongs	1:13.05	$112,900	III	
Autumn Days Handicap
1998	Dance Parade	4	Kent J. Desormeaux	Neil D. Drysdale	Prince Fahd Salman	abt. 6 1/2 furlongs	1:13.87	$100,000	III	
1997	Madame Pandit	4	Eddie Delahoussaye	Ron McAnally	Janis R. Whitham	abt. 6 1/2 furlongs	1:13.82	$100,000	Listed	
1996	Dixie Pearl	4	Eddie Delahoussaye	Richard E. Mandella	Ann & Jerry Moss	abt. 6 1/2 furlongs	1:12.33	$106,400	Listed	
1995	Denim Yenem	3	Chris McCarron	Ronald W. Ellis	Jan, Mace & Samantha Siegel	abt. 6 1/2 furlongs	1:14.92	$105,400	Listed	
1994	Starolamo	5	Kent J. Desormeaux	Kim Lloyd	Lamont Isom & Stanley Moore	6 1/2 furlongs	1:16.07	$81,225	Listed	
1993	Toussaud	4	Kent J. Desormeaux	Robert J. Frankel	Juddmonte Farms	abt. 6 1/2 furlongs	1:14.32	$80,700	Listed	
1992	Bel's Starlet	5	Kent J. Desormeaux	Richard E. Mandella	Golden Eagle Farm	abt. 6 1/2 furlongs	1:11.63	$83,325	Listed	
1991	§ Bel's Starlet	4	Kent J. Desormeaux	Richard E. Mandella	Golden Eagle Farm	abt. 6 1/2 furlongs	1:11.89	$85,875	Listed	
1990	Stylish Star	4	Eddie Delahoussaye	Dan L. Hendricks	Mr. & Mrs. Thomas M. Cavanagh	abt. 6 1/2 furlongs	1:12.00	$85,275		
1989	Warning Zone	4	Rafael Q. Meza	Ron McAnally	Covella & Hernandez	abt. 6 1/2 furlongs	1:12.80	$85,425		
1988	Jeanne Jones	3	Aaron Gryder	Charles E. Whittingham	Golden Eagle Farm	abt. 6 1/2 furlongs	1:14.80	$86,850		
1987	Aberuschka (IRE)	5	Pat Valenzuela	Robert J. Frankel	Ann & Jerry Moss	abt. 6 1/2 furlongs	1:14.80	$68,050		
1986	Lichi (CHI)	6	Gary Baze	Gary F. Jones	Preston Farm	abt. 6 1/2 furlongs	1:14.60	$50,125		Division 1
1986	Shywing	4	Laffit Pincay Jr.	Jerry M. Fanning	Cardiff Stud Farm	abt. 6 1/2 furlongs	1:14.80	$51,325		Division 2
1985	Solva (GB)	4	Rafael Q. Meza	Robert J. Frankel	Ann & Jerry Moss	abt. 6 1/2 furlongs	1:14.60	$51,175		Division 1
1985	Love Smitten	4	Gary L. Stevens	Edwin J. Gregson	Gailyndel Farms	abt. 6 1/2 furlongs	1:15.40	$49,975		Division 2
1984	Irish O'Brien	6	Joseph J. Steiner	Hector O. Palma	Barry & Susan Isaacs	abt. 6 1/2 furlongs	1:14.60	$52,450		Division 1
1984	Lina Cavalieri (GB)	4	Eddie Delahoussaye	Robert J. Frankel	Ann & Jerry Moss	abt. 6 1/2 furlongs	1:14.40	$50,650		Division 2
1983	Matching	5	Ray Sibille	Steven L. Morguelan	Glencrest Farm & Steven L. Morguelan	6 1/2 furlongs	1:17.00	$64,850		
1982	Maple Tree	4	Eddie Delahoussaye	Richard E. Mandella	Elmendorf	abt. 6 1/2 furlongs	1:15.60	$50,900		Division 1
1982	Jones Time Machine	3	Laffit Pincay Jr.	D. Wayne Lukas	Duke C. Jones	abt. 6 1/2 furlongs	1:16.00	$52,200		Division 2
1981	Kilijaro (IRE)	5	Laffit Pincay Jr.	Charles E. Whittingham	Serge Fradkoff & Edward A. Seltzer	abt. 6 1/2 furlongs	1:13.80	$46,650		Division 1
1981	Save Wild Life	4	Marco Castaneda	Howard M. Tesher	H. Joseph Allen	abt. 6 1/2 furlongs	1:14.20	$47,750		Division 2
1980	Great Lady M.	5	Pat Valenzuela	D. Wayne Lukas	Robert H. Spreen	abt. 6 1/2 furlongs	1:13.60	$47,400		
1979	Palmistry	4	Chris McCarron	Willard L. Proctor	William Haggin Perry	abt. 6 1/2 furlongs	1:12.80	$35,825		Division 1
1979	Wishing Well	4	Fernando Toro	Gary F. Jones	Michael Lima	abt. 6 1/2 furlongs	1:12.60	$34,925		Division 2
1978	Happy Holme	3	Chris McCarron	Warren Stute	Indian Hill Stable	abt. 6 1/2 furlongs	1:14.20	$35,400		Division 1
1978	† Country Queen	4	Fernando Toro	Randy Winick	Maribel G. Blum	abt. 6 1/2 furlongs	1:14.20	$35,000		Division 2
1977	Dancing Femme	4	Darrel McHargue	A. Thomas Doyle	Jack L. Finley	abt. 6 1/2 furlongs	1:13.20	$35,700		
1976	If You Prefer	5	Laffit Pincay Jr.	Roger E. Clapp	Connie M. Ring	abt. 6 1/2 furlongs	1:13.00	$25,875		Division 1
1976	Dancing Liz	4	Bill Shoemaker	David Bernstein	Ralph E. & Aury Todd	abt. 6 1/2 furlongs	1:12.40	$26,175		Division 2
1975	Tizna (CHI)	6	Donald Pierce	Henry Moreno	Nile Financial Corporation	abt. 6 1/2 furlongs	1:12.80	$28,950		
1974	Impressive Style	5	Rudy Rosales	Bill McCormick	Ellwood B. & Elizabeth E. Johnston	abt. 6 1/2 furlongs	1:13.80	$30,400	III	
1973	New Moon II (NZ)	6	Bill Shoemaker	Charles E. Whittingham	Mary Jones Bradley & Charles E. Whittingham	abt. 6 1/2 furlongs	1:13.20	$30,450	III	
1972	Street Dancer	5	Fernando Toro	John G. Canty	William T. Brady	abt. 6 1/2 furlongs	1:13.60	$28,800		
1971	Manta	5	Howard Grant	Farrell W. Jones	Elmendorf	abt. 6 1/2 furlongs	1:12.80	$29,100		
1970	Ack Ack	4	Bill Shoemaker	Charles E. Whittingham	Cain Hoy Stable	abt. 6 1/2 furlongs	1:13.00	$21,900		3YO+
Autumn Days Stakes
1969	§ Tell	3	Bill Shoemaker	Charles E. Whittingham	Elizabeth A. Keck	abt. 6 1/2 furlongs	1:13.60	$27,450		3YO+

Legend:
Dirt Turf
Notes:
§ Ran as an entry
† In the 1978 running of the Second Division of the event, Sweet Little Lady was first past the post but was disqualified for interference in the straight and Country Queen was declared the winner.

== See also ==
List of American and Canadian Graded races
