= Monrovia Stakes =

Annual horse race in Arcadia, California, US

- Class: Grade III
- Location: Santa Anita Park; Arcadia, California, United States
- Inaugurated: 1968
- Race type: Thoroughbred - Flat racing
- Website: www.santaanita.com

Race information
- Distance: about 6 1/2 furlongs
- Surface: Turf
- Track: left-handed
- Qualification: Fillies and mares four years old and older
- Weight: 124lbs with allowances
- Purse: $100,000 (2024)

The Monrovia Stakes is a Grade III American Thoroughbred horse race for fillies and mares, four years old and older over a distance of about 6 1/2 furlongs on the downhill turf course scheduled annually in April at Santa Anita Park in Arcadia, California.

== History ==
The event was inaugurated in 1968 as the Monrovia Handicap.

When conditions are too wet the Los Angeles Turf Club on discretion has moved the event to the dirt track. This has happened on several occasions including 1969, 1970, 1976, 1978, 1980, 1989, 1997, 2000, 2004, 2005 and 2019.

The event was run in two divisions in 1979.

The event was originally scheduled in February but the Los Angeles Turf Club in late 1999 moved the race to the start of the winter racing meet at Santa Anita whereby the race was run twice in the calendar year. The conditions of the race were modified so that three year old fillies could also enter the event. In 1999 and 2004 three year old fillies were victorious in the event.

In 2006 the club reverted to later in the 2006–2007 winter meet and consequently the event was not held in 2006. In 2007 the conditions were reverted so that only four year olds and older fillies and mares could enter. In 2017 the event was moved from January to May and the event once again allowed three year old fillies to enter.

The race is named after Monrovia, the local city near the track at Arcadia.

The race was renamed to the current name in 2011.

In 2019, the distance was shortened by over a furlong to five furlongs, and held on the dirt track due to the weather. In 2020 the event was extended to 5 1/2 furlongs and the following year was held at 6 1/2 furlongs.

In 2023 the event was downgraded by the Thoroughbred Owners and Breeders Association. However, the event was moved to the dirt and subsequently was downgraded to a Listed event.

== Records ==
Speed record:

- abt. 6 1/2 furlongs: 1:11.14 – Pontchatrain (2014)

Most wins by an owner:

- 2 - William Haggin Perry (1969, 1979)
- 2 - Fred W. Hooper (1972, 1975)
- 2 - Bernard J. Ridder (1976, 1977)
- 2 - Ann & Jerry Moss (1985, 1988)
- 2 - William de Burgh (1991, 2010)

Most wins:

- 2 - Winter Solstice (1976, 1977)
- 2 - Mizdirection (2012, 2013)

Most wins by a jockey:

- 4 - Kent Desormeaux (1991, 2000, 2001, 2015)

Most wins by a trainer:

- 3 - Charles E. Whittingham (1979, 1981, 1989)
- 3 - Robert J. Frankel (1985, 1988, 2009)
- 3 - Richard E. Mandella (1986, 2001, 2019)

== Winners ==
Year	Winner	Age	Jockey	Trainer	Owner	Distance	Time	Purse	Grade	Ref
Monrovia Stakes
2026	Spirited Boss	4	Mike E. Smith	Jose F. D'Angelo	Tag Stables LLC	abt. 6 1/2 furlongs	1:12.00	$100,500	III	
2025	Queen Maxima	4	Juan J. Hernandez	Jeff Mullins	Dutch Girl Holdings & Irving Ventures	abt. 6 1/2 furlongs	1:12.93	$100,500	III	
2024	Ag Bullet	4	Umberto Rispoli	Richard Baltas	Calvin Nguyen & Joey C. Tran	abt. 6 1/2 furlongs	1:12.67	$101,000	III	
2023	Elm Drive	4	Ramon Vazquez	Philip D'Amato	Little Red Feather Racing	6 1/2 furlongs	1:15.56	$201,000	Listed	
2022	Brooke Marie	6	Juan Hernandez	Eddie Kenneally	Castleton Lyons	abt. 6 1/2 furlongs	1:13.42	$200,500	II	
2021	Venetian Harbor	4	Mario Gutierrez	Richard Baltas	Ciaglia Racing, Highland Yard, River Oak Farm & Domenic Savides	6 1/2 furlongs	1:15.06	$201,500	II	
2020	Jolie Olimpica (BRZ)	4	Mike E. Smith	Richard E. Mandella	Fox Hill Farms (Rick Porter)	5 1/2 furlongs	1:01.11	$201,000	II	
2019	S Y Sky	5	Drayden Van Dyke	Philip D'Amato	Nicholas B. Alexander	5 furlongs	0:57.54	$200,702	III	
2018	Belvoir Bay (GB)	5	Victor Espinoza	Peter L. Miller	Team Valor International & Gary Barber	abt. 6 1/2 furlongs	1:12.80	$201,380	II	
2017	Illuminant	5	Flavien Prat	Michael W. McCarthy	Eclipse Thoroughbred Partners, Head of Plains Partners, SF Racing	abt. 6 1/2 furlongs	1:12.13	$201,035	II	
2016	Prize Exhibit (GB)	4	Santiago Gonzalez	James M. Cassidy	DP Racing	abt. 6 1/2 furlongs	1:12.96	$201,500	II	
2015	Shrinking Violet	5	Kent J. Desormeaux	Wesley A. Ward	Wesley A. Ward	abt. 6 1/2 furlongs	1:12.56	$201,500	II	
2014	Pontchatrain	4	Gary L. Stevens	Thomas F. Proctor	Glen Hill Farm	abt. 6 1/2 furlongs	1:11.14	$200,500	II	
2013	Mizdirection	5	Mike E. Smith	Mike Puype	Jungle Racing LLC, et al.	abt. 6 1/2 furlongs	1:11.94	$150,000	II	
2012	Mizdirection	4	Garrett K. Gomez	Mike Puype	Jungle Racing LLC, et al.	abt. 6 1/2 furlongs	1:11.64	$100,000	III	
2011	Unzip Me	5	Rafael Bejarano	Martin F. Jones	Harris Farms Inc., Valpredo et al.	abt. 6 1/2 furlongs	1:12.72	$100,000	III	
Monrovia Handicap
2010	Tuscan Evening (IRE)	5	Rafael Bejarano	Jerry Hollendorfer	William de Burgh	abt. 6 1/2 furlongs	1:12.56	$100,000	III	
2009	Jibboom	5	Garrett K. Gomez	Robert J. Frankel	Juddmonte Farms	abt. 6 1/2 furlongs	1:13.21	$100,000	III	
2008	Alexandra Rose (SAF)	6	Rafael Bejarano	Neil D. Drysdale	Team Valor	abt. 6 1/2 furlongs	1:12.86	$110,400	III	
2007	Society Hostess	5	Garrett K. Gomez	Christophe Clement	Moyglare Stud Farm	abt. 6 1/2 furlongs	1:12.85	$116,100	III	
2006¶	Race not held									
2005	Awesome Lady	4	Tyler Baze	Gary Stute	Mike Cavanaugh & Gary Stute	6 1/2 furlongs	1:16.77	$112,600	Listed	
2004	Resplendency	3	Casey Fusilier	Bob Baffert	Robert & Beverly Lewis	6 1/2 furlongs	1:15.34	$113,550	Listed	
2003	Icantgoforthat	4	Tyler Baze	Steve Knapp	Andy Broberg & Palmer Knapp	abt. 6 1/2 furlongs	1:13.07	$109,300	III	
2002	Lil Sister Stich	5	Laffit Pincay Jr.	Doug F. O'Neill	Howard, Kilgor, Koser, et al.	abt. 6 1/2 furlongs	1:13.81	$114,700	III	
2001	Paga (ARG)	4	Mike E. Smith	Richard E. Mandella	Edward C. Allred & Randall D. Hubbard	abt. 6 1/2 furlongs	1:15.09	$109,300	III	
2000	Evening Promise (GB)	4	Kent J. Desormeaux	Kathy Walsh	Richard Duggan & James R. Vreeland	abt. 6 1/2 furlongs	1:12.62	$114,400	III	
1999 (Dec.)	Show Me the Stage	3	Kent J. Desormeaux	Eric Guillot	Brian Cain, Eric Guillot & Terry LeBlanc	6 1/2 furlongs	1:15.14	$104,762	III	
1999 (Jan.)	Desert Lady (IRE)	4	Corey Nakatani	Wallace Dollase	The Thoroughbred Corp.	abt. 6 1/2 furlongs	1:14.59	$108,500	III	
1998	Madame Pandit	5	Eddie Delahoussaye	Ronald L. McAnally	Janis R. Whitham	6 1/2 furlongs	1:15.80	$109,500	III	
1997	Grab the Prize	5	Alex O. Solis	Darrell Vienna	Ernest Auerbach	6 1/2 furlongs	1:16.89	$106,900	III	
1996	Klassy Kim	5	Goncalino Almeida	Melvin F. Stute	Bill M. Thomas	abt. 6 1/2 furlongs	1:14.48	$105,650	III	
1995	Rabiadella	4	Pat Valenzuela	J. Michael Orman	Stonehenge Stables	abt. 6 1/2 furlongs	1:14.92	$81,200	III	
1994	Mamselle Bebette	4	Corey Nakatani	Jack Van Berg	Big Train Farm	6 1/2 furlongs	1:15.35	$83,400	III	
1993	Glen Kate (IRE)	6	Corey Black	Bill Shoemaker	Wayne Gretzky & Bruce McNall	abt. 6 1/2 furlongs	1:12.89	$82,400	III	
1992	Middlefork Rapids	4	Pat Valenzuela	Terry Knight	Dame Construction Co., Inc.	abt. 6 1/2 furlongs	1:12.55	$84,900	III	
1991	Wedding Bouquet (IRE)	4	Kent J. Desormeaux	Gary F. Jones	William de Burgh (Lessee)	abt. 6 1/2 furlongs	1:13.80	$85,625	III	
1990	Down Again	6	Corey Black	Richard J. Cross	Larry Robinson & Summa Stable	abt. 6 1/2 furlongs	1:13.00	$83,950	III	
1989	Daloma (FR)	5	Fernando H. Valenzuela	Charles E. Whittingham	Enemy Stables & Mandysland Farm	6 1/2 furlongs	1:16.20	$83,300	Listed	
1988	Aberuschka (IRE)	6	Gary L. Stevens	Robert J. Frankel	Ann & Jerry Moss	abt. 6 1/2 furlongs	1:14.60	$83,800	Listed	
1987	Sari's Heroine	4	Pat Valenzuela	Melvin F. Stute	Carl E. Grinstead & Ben Rochelle	abt. 6 1/2 furlongs	1:15.00	$65,400	Listed	
1986	Water Crystals	5	Gary L. Stevens	Richard E. Mandella	Bruce Steinberg	abt. 6 1/2 furlongs	1:15.60	$67,100	Listed	
1985	Lina Cavalieri (GB)	5	Eddie Delahoussaye	Robert J. Frankel	Ann & Jerry Moss	abt. 6 1/2 furlongs	1:14.00	$66,650	Listed	
1984	Tangent (NZ)	4	Julio A. Garcia	Wayne Murty	Bacchus, Harrison, McGee, et al.	abt. 6 1/2 furlongs	1:14.60	$69,950	Listed	
1983	Matching	5	Ray Sibille	Steven L. Morguelan	Glencrest Farm & Morguelan	abt. 6 1/2 furlongs	1:13.20	$67,600	Listed	
1982	Cat Girl	4	Chris McCarron	Edwin J. Gregson	Windblown Farm	abt. 6 1/2 furlongs	1:14.60	$68,250	Listed	
1981	Kilijaro (IRE)	5	Marco Castaneda	Charles E. Whittingham	Serge Fradkoff	abt. 6 1/2 furlongs	1:12.40	$57,450	Listed	
1980	Fondre	5	Frank Olivares	John W. Fulton	William L. Currin & William R. Hawn	6 1/2 furlongs	1:15.20	$45,500	Listed	
1979	Camarado	4	Bill Shoemaker	Charles E. Whittingham	Nelson Bunker Hunt	abt. 6 1/2 furlongs	1:15.40	$36,400	Listed	Division 1
1979	Palmistry	4	Chris McCarron	Willard L. Proctor	William Haggin Perry	abt. 6 1/2 furlongs	1:15.20	$36,000	Listed	Division 2
1978	Little Happiness	4	Laffit Pincay Jr.	Laz Barrera	Harbor View Farm	abt. 6 1/2 furlongs	1:16.00	$44,200	Listed	
1977	Winter Solstice	5	Mark S. Sellers	Gordon C. Campbell	Bernard J. Ridder	abt. 6 1/2 furlongs	1:13.60	$45,600	Listed	
1976	Winter Solstice	4	Jerry Lambert	Gordon C. Campbell	Bernard J. Ridder	6 1/2 furlongs	1:17.60	$33,800	Listed	
1975	†Special Goddess	4	Sandy Hawley	Robert Smith	Fred W. Hooper	abt. 6 1/2 furlongs	1:13.80	$34,200	Listed	
1974	Viva La Vivi	4	Donald Pierce	Harold Hodosh	Alix Brotman & Malibu Stable	abt. 6 1/2 furlongs	1:15.00	$29,050	Listed	
1973	Tizna (CHI)	4	Fernando Toro	Henry M. Moreno	Regal Enterprises Inc.	abt. 6 1/2 furlongs	1:13.80	$36,200	Listed	
1972	Mia Mood	4	Victor Tejada	John W. Russell	Fred W. Hooper	abt. 6 1/2 furlongs	1:13.00	$33,850		
1971	Atomic Wings	4	Robby Kilborn	James I. Nazworthy	Sledge Stable (Maxine Nazworthy)	abt. 6 1/2 furlongs	1:13.40	$29,100		
1970	Beautiful Dream	5	Jerry Lambert	Joseph S. Dunn	J. T. Jones	6 1/2 furlongs	1:16.20	$23,750		
1969	Morgaise	4	Donald Pierce	James W. Maloney	William Haggin Perry	6 1/2 furlongs	1:22.20	$22,500		
1968	Mellow Marsh	5	Mario Valenzuela	Jay Saladin	Edward C. Flynn	abt. 6 1/2 furlongs	1:13.40	$29,500		

Legend:
Turf Dirt
Notes:
¶ Not held due to change of scheduling during the winter meet
† Viva La Vivi won the race but was disqualified and placed last for interference

== See also ==
List of American and Canadian Graded races
