= Beholder Mile Stakes =

- Class: Grade I
- Location: Santa Anita Park; Arcadia, California, USA
- Inaugurated: 1940 (as Vanity Handicap)
- Race type: Thoroughbred – Flat racing
- Website: www.santaanita.com

Race information
- Distance: 1 mile (8 furlongs)
- Surface: Dirt
- Track: left-handed
- Qualification: Fillies & Mares, Three-years-old & Up
- Weight: Allowance
- Purse: $500,000 (2022)

The Beholder Mile Stakes is a Grade I American Thoroughbred horse race for fillies and mares aged three and up. It is run over a distance of one mile on the dirt each year in March at Santa Anita Park in Arcadia, California.

== History ==
The event was inaugurated in 1940 as the Vanity Handicap at Hollywood Park Racetrack in Inglewood, California over the current distance of one mile.

In 1968 Gamely won carrying a record weight for a winner of 131 pounds in the race. Her owner William Haggin Perry had the three placegetters in the race which carried a record high stakes amount for the fillies and mares of $79,650.

Originally an open handicap for fillies and mares aged three years and up, in 1987 it was changed to an invitational handicap for selected fillies and mares. Over the next three decades, the race switched between open handicap and invitational handicap formats. Following the closure of Hollywood Park, the race moved to Santa Anita Park in 2014. In that same year, the event was changed from the handicap format to a weight-for-age race with allowances for horses who had not recently won a graded stakes race.

In 2016 it was announced that the race would be renamed the Vanity Mile and the distance reduced accordingly. In 2017 it was announced that the race would be renamed after the Champion Mare Beholder.

The race is normally run on dirt, except between 2007 and 2013 when Hollywood Park used a synthetic Cushion Track surface.

The race was not run in 1942 and 1943 due to wartime restrictions.

=== Distance ===
The race has since been contested at various distances:

- 1 mile – 1940; 2016–present;
- 1 1/16 miles – 1941, 1944–1949, 1951–1953;
- 1 1/8 miles – 1950, 1954–1985, 1988–2015;
- 1 1/4 miles – 1986–1987.

== Records ==
Time record:

- 1:34.96 for 1 mile – Cavalieri (2025)
- 1:46.20 for 1 1/8 miles – Princess Rooney (1984)

Most wins:

- 3 – Zenyatta (2008, 2009, 2010)

Most wins by a trainer:

- 5 – John Shirreffs (1999, 2006, 2008, 2009, 2010)

Most wins by a jockey:

- 7 – Mike E. Smith (2002, 2003, 2008, 2009, 2010, 2015, 2018)

== Winners since 1972 ==
Year	Winner	Age	Weight	Jockey	Trainer	Owner	Time	Distance (miles)	Purse
Beholder Mile Stakes
2026	Splendora	5	120	Juan Hernandez	Bob Baffert	Boyd Racing and By Talla Racing LLC	1:35.16	1	$300,000
2025	Cavalieri	4	122	Juan Hernandez	Bob Baffert	Speedway Stables	1:34.96	1	$300,000
2024	Sweet Azteca	4	122	Flavien Prat	Michael McCarthy	Pamela Ziebarth	1:36.40	1	$500,000
2023	A Mo Reay	4	122	Flavien Prat	Brad H. Cox	Hunter Valley Farm	1:36.25	1	$500,000
2022	As Time Goes By	5	122	Flavien Prat	Bob Baffert	Michael B. Tabor, Mrs. John Magnier and Derrick Smith	1:37.55	1	$500,000
2021	Swiss Skydiver	4	124	Robby Albarado	Kenneth McPeek	Peter J. Callahan	1:36.18	1	$300,000
2020	Ce Ce	4	121	Victor Espinoza	Michael W. McCarthy	Bo Hirsch LLC	1:37.33	1	$400,000
2019	Secret Spice	4	121	Geovanni Franco	Richard Baltas	Little Red Feather Racing	1:38.39	1	$400,000
2018	Unique Bella	4	121	Mike E. Smith	Jerry Hollendorfer	Don Alberto Stable	1:35.60	1	$400,000
2017	Stellar Wind	5	126	Victor Espinoza	John W. Sadler	Hronis Racing LLC	1:36.14	1	$400,000
Vanity Mile Stakes
2016	Beholder	6	123	Gary Stevens	Richard E. Mandella	Spendthrift Farm	1:35.97	1	$400,000
Vanity Stakes
2015	My Sweet Addiction	5	119	Mike E. Smith	Martin F. Jones	Pamela C. Ziebarth	1:49.73	1 1/8	$300,000
2014	Iotapa	4	119	Joe Talamo	John W. Sadler	Hronis Racing	1:47.64	1 1/8	$300,000
Vanity Handicap / Vanity Invitational Handicap
2013	Byrama (GB)	4	117	Gary Stevens	Simon Callaghan	Eclipse Thoroughbred Partners	1:51.40	1 1/8	$250,000
2012	Love Theway Youare	4	115	Garrett Gomez	Myung Kwon Cho	Myung Kwon Cho	1:51.10	1 1/8	$250,000
2011	Blind Luck	4	123	Garrett Gomez	Jerry Hollendorfer	Hollendorfer/Dedomenico/Carver/Abruzzo	1:50.89	1 1/8	$250,000
2010	Zenyatta	6	129	Mike E. Smith	John Shirreffs	Jerry & Ann Moss	1:49.01	1 1/8	$250,000
2009	Zenyatta	5	129	Mike E. Smith	John Shirreffs	Jerry & Ann Moss	1:48.15	1 1/8	$300,000
2008	Zenyatta	4	124	Mike E. Smith	John Shirreffs	Jerry & Ann Moss	1:49.51	1 1/8	$300,000
2007	Nashoba's Key	4	118	Joe Talamo	Carla Gaines	Warren B. Williamson	1:48.83	1 1/8	$300,000
2006	Hollywood Story	5	118	David R. Flores	John Shirreffs	George Krikorian	1:48.55	1 1/8	$300,000
2005	Splendid Blended	3	120	Jerry D. Bailey	Neil D. Drysdale	Peter Vegso Racing	1:49.33	1 1/8	$300,000
2004	Victory Encounter	4	116	Alex Solis	John W. Sadler	Tom Mankiewicz	1:48.28	1 1/8	$250,000
2003	Azeri	5	127	Mike E. Smith	Laura de Seroux	A. Paulson Living Trust	1:48.48	1 1/8	$250,000
2002	Azeri	4	125	Mike E. Smith	Laura de Seroux	A. Paulson Living Trust	1:48.88	1 1/8	$250,000
2001	Gourmet Girl	6	119	Gary Stevens	Pico Perdomo	Gary A. Tanaka	1:49.21	1 1/8	$250,000
2000	Riboletta	5	123	Chris McCarron	Eduardo Inda	Aaron & Marie Jones	1:48.54	1 1/8	$300,000
1999	Manistique	4	122	Chris McCarron	John Shirreffs	505 Farms	1:48.06	1 1/8	$400,000
1998	Escena	5	124	Jerry D. Bailey	William I. Mott	Allen E. Paulson	1:48.00	1 1/8	$350,000
1997	Twice the Vice	5	121	Chris McCarron	Ronald W. Ellis	Martin & Pam Wygod	1:46.40	1 1/8	$400,000
1996	Jewel Princess	4	120	Corey Nakatani	Wallace Dollase	Richard & Martha Stephen	1:47.00	1 1/8	$250,000
1995	Private Persuasion	4	114	Gary Stevens	Dan Hendricks	Martin & Pam Wygod	1:48.20	1 1/8	$300,000
1994	Potridee	5	114	Alex Solis	Ron McAnally	Leslie Grimm	1:48.08	1 1/8	$300,000
1993	Re Toss	6	115	Eddie Delahoussaye	Henry M. Moreno	Arthur & Larry Risdon	1:47.92	1 1/8	$300,000
1992	Paseana	5	127	Chris McCarron	Ron McAnally	Sidney H. Craig	1:48.06	1 1/8	$300,000
1991	Brought To Mind	4	120	Pat Valenzuela	Ron McAnally	Tadahiro Hotehama	1:48.50	1 1/8	$200,000
1990	Gorgeous	4	124	Eddie Delahoussaye	Neil D. Drysdale	Robert N. Clay	1:48.20	1 1/8	$200,000
1989	Bayakoa	5	125	Laffit Pincay, Jr.	Ron McAnally	Janis & Frank Whitham	1:47.20	1 1/8	$200,000
1988	Annoconnor	4	114	Corey Black	John Gosden	Morton Fink & Roy Gottlieb	1:49.20	1 1/8	$200,000
1987	Infinidad	5	113	Corey Black	Charles E. Whittingham	Arthur B. Hancock III	2:00.60	1 1/4	$200,000
1986	Magnificent Lindy	4	116	Chris McCarron	Neil Drysdale	Paula L. Tucker	2:02.00	1 1/4	$200,000
1985	Dontstop Themusic	5	118	Ángel Cordero Jr.	Randy Winick	Mr. & Mrs. Albert Broccoli	1:47.80	1 1/8	$200,000
1984	Princess Rooney	4	120	Eddie Delahoussaye	Neil Drysdale	Paula L. Tucker	1:46.20	1 1/8	$200,000
1983	A Kiss for Luck	4	114	Chris McCarron	Jerry Fanning	Paula L. Tucker	1:49.20	1 1/8	$200,000
1982	Sangue	4	120	Bill Shoemaker	Henry M. Moreno	R. Charlene Parks	1:48.00	1 1/8	$200,000
1981	Track Robbery	5	120	Patrick Valenzuela	Robert L. Wheeler	Summa Stable	1:47.00	1 1/8	$200,000
1980	It's In The Air	4	120	Laffit Pincay, Jr.	Laz Barrera	Harbor View Farm	1:47.00	1 1/8	$150,000
1979	It's In The Air	3	113	Laffit Pincay, Jr.	Laz Barrera	Harbor View Farm	1:47.40	1 1/8	$125,000
1978	Afifa	4	113	Bill Shoemaker	Gene Cleveland	Swiftsure Stable	1:46.40	1 1/8	$125,000
1977	Cascapedia	4	129	Sandy Hawley	Gordon C. Campbell	Bernard J. Ridder	1:47.60	1 1/8	$100,000
1976	Miss Toshiba	4	120	Fernando Toro	Thomas A. Pratt	Robert Sangster	1:48.00	1 1/8	$100,000
1975	Dulcia	6	118	Bill Shoemaker	Charles E. Whittingham	Helen G. Stollery	1:47.40	1 1/8	
1974	Tallahto	4	126	Laffit Pincay, Jr.	Charles E. Whittingham	Elizabeth A. Keck	1:47.00	1 1/8	
1973	Convenience	5	121	John L. Rotz	Willard L. Proctor	Glen Hill Farm	1:47.80	1 1/8	
1972	Convenience	4	121	Jerry Lambert	Willard L. Proctor	Glen Hill Farm	1:47.80	1 1/8	

Dirt	All Weather Track (Cushion Track)
At Santa Anita Park	At Hollywood Park Racetrack

=== Earlier winners ===
- 1971 : Hi Q.
- 1970 : Commissary
- 1969 : Desert Law
- 1968 : Gamely
- 1967 : Desert Love
- 1966 : Khal Ireland
- 1965 : Jalousie
- 1964 : Star Maggie
- 1963 : Table Mate
- 1962 : Linita
- 1961 : Perizade
- 1960 : Silver Spoon
- † 1959 : Zevs Joy / Tender Size
- 1958 : Annie-Lu-San
- 1957 : Annie-Lu-San
- 1956 : Mary Machree
- 1955 : Countess Fleet
- 1954 : Bubbley
- 1953 : Fleet Khal
- 1952 : Two Lea
- 1951 : Bewitch
- 1950 : Next Move
- 1949 : Silver Drift
- 1948 : Hemet Squaw
- 1947 : Honeymoon
- 1946 : Be Faithful
- 1945 : Busher
- 1944 : Happy Issue
- ‡1943 : Race not held
- ‡1942 : Race not held
- 1941 : Painted Veil
- 1940 : Etolia II

Notes:
† Run in two divisions in 1959.
‡ Race not held due to World War II
