= William Harmatz =

American jockey

Personal information
- Born: February 9, 1931 Wilkes-Barre, Pennsylvania, United States
- Died: January 27, 2011 (aged 79)
- Occupation: Jockey

Horse racing career
- Sport: Horse racing
- Career wins: 1,770

Major racing wins
- La Jolla Handicap (1954); Del Mar Derby (1955); Santa Anita Maturity (1957, 1958); Graduation Stakes (1957); Hawthorne Gold Cup (1957); Golden Gate Handicap (1957); American Handicap (1958, 1960, 1966); Beldame Stakes (1958); Bing Crosby Handicap (1958); Los Angeles Handicap (1958, 1962, 1963); San Diego Handicap (1958); San Gabriel Handicap (1958, 1965); San Carlos Handicap (1958); San Felipe Stakes (1959); Sapling Stakes (1959); Westchester Stakes (1959); Black-Eyed Susan Stakes (1960); San Antonio Handicap (1961); Santa Margarita Invitational Handicap (1961); Californian Stakes (1962, 1966, 1967); Del Mar Oaks (1962); Oceanside Handicap (1962); Premiere Handicap (1962); Bowling Green Handicap (1963); Milady Handicap (1965); Ashland Stakes (1967); Balboa Handicap (1967); Best Pal Stakes (1967); Charles H. Strub Stakes (1968); Baldwin Stakes (1968) American Classics wins: Preakness Stakes (1959)

Racing awards
- George Woolf Memorial Jockey Award (1960)

Honors
- International Jewish Sports Hall of Fame (1999)

Significant horses
- Find, T. V. Lark, Round Table, Royal Orbit, Silky Sullivan
- Updated on Hemophilia Foundation Man of the Year

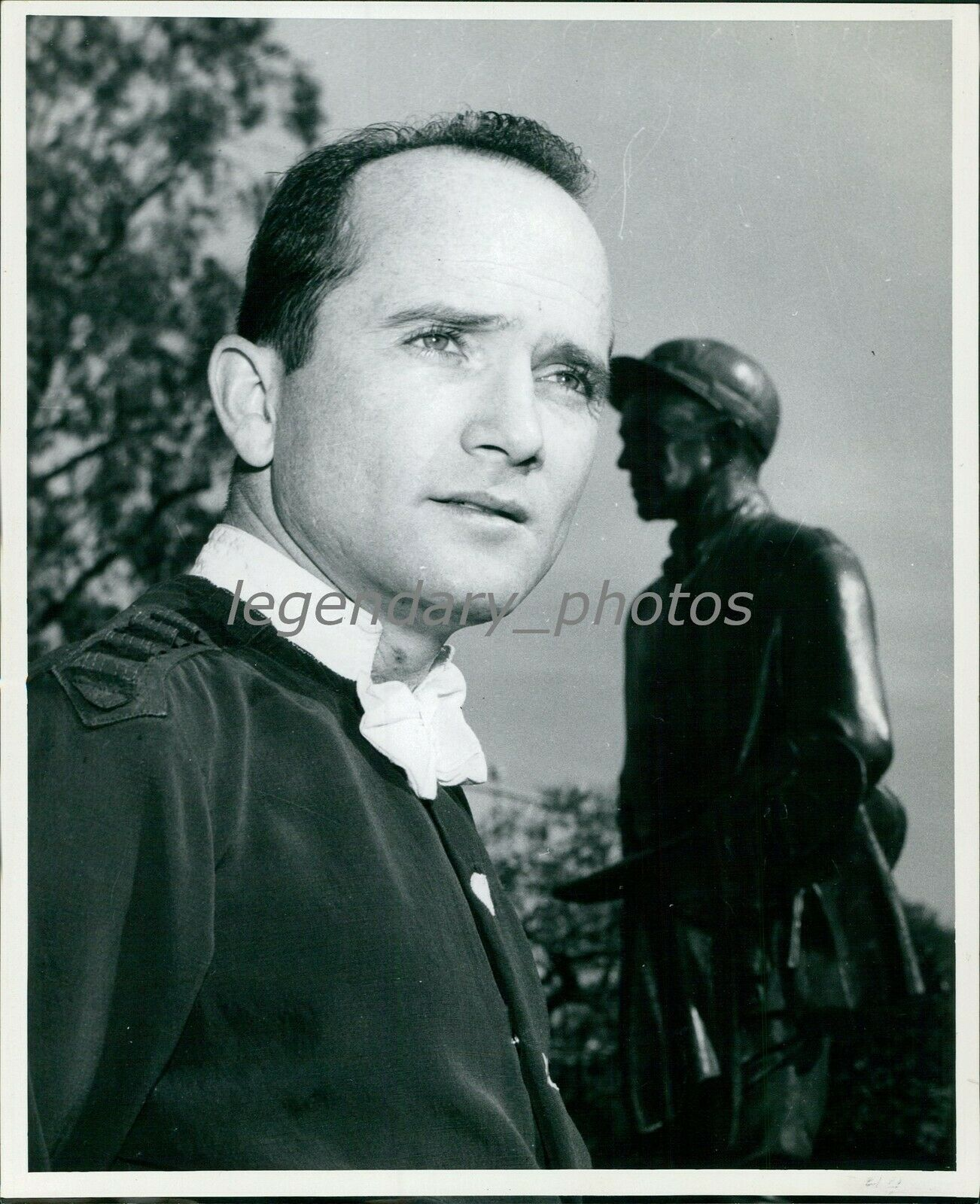
William Harmatz accepting the George Wolf Memorial Award

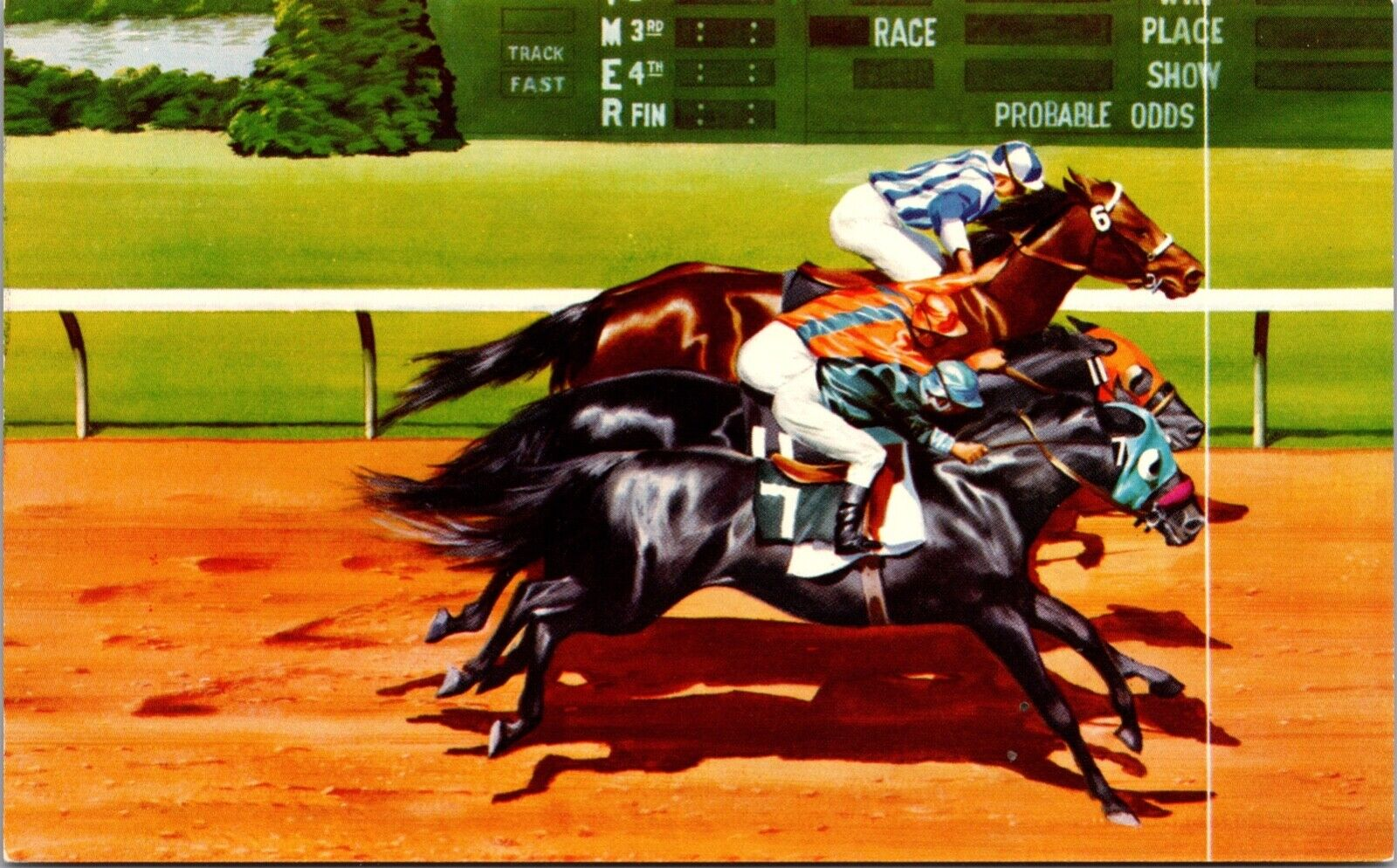

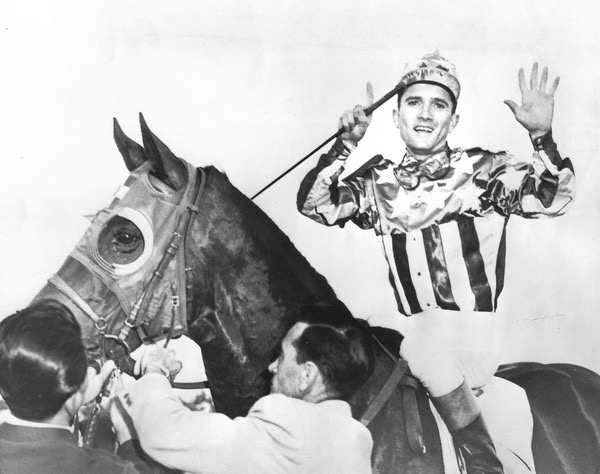

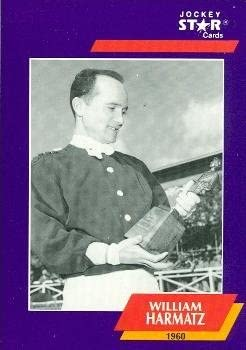

William Harmatz (February 9, 1931 – January 27, 2011) was an American Thoroughbred horse racing jockey who won the 1959 Preakness Stakes aboard Royal Orbit. The recipient of the George Woolf Memorial Jockey Award in 1960, given to a jockey who demonstrates high standards of personal and professional conduct, on and off the racetrack, Harmatz was Jewish, and was inducted in the International Jewish Sports Hall of Fame in 1999.

Born in Wilkes-Barre, Pennsylvania, Harmatz was reported in the media as "Willie", "Bill" and by people who knew him, as "Billy". He was still a child when his family relocated to Boyle Heights in East Los Angeles, California where he was a star gymnast at Theodore Roosevelt High School. As a teenager, he began exercising Thoroughbred racehorses which would lead to a professional riding career beginning in 1953 at the Agua Caliente Racetrack in Tijuana, Mexico. The following year, on April 23, 1954, he had six consecutive wins at Bay Meadows Racetrack. In 1957, he was part of a rare triple dead heat at Hollywood Park Racetrack with fellow jockeys George Taniguchi and Bill Shoemaker.

Harmatz appeared as the character Nick Pressy in a 1971 episode of the television series Mission: Impossible titled Run for the Money. In 1974 he made another television appearance as the character Tim Diamond in an episode of Banacek titled Horse of a Slightly Different Color.

After retiring from racing in 1971, Harmatz became a successful and community-minded businessman who operated Vista Entertainment Center in Vista, California. Married to wife Connie for 59 years, they were parents of three daughters and one son. In 1990 he was inducted into the Southern California Jewish Sports Hall of Fame.

William Harmatz died at age 79 in 2011 at his home in Vista, California.
