= Willard L. Proctor Memorial Stakes =

- Class: Discontinued stakes
- Location: Hollywood Park Racetrack; Inglewood, California, United States
- Inaugurated: 1953 – 2011
- Race type: Thoroughbred - Flat racing
- Website: www.hollywoodpark.com

Race information
- Distance: 5.5 furlongs
- Surface: Dirt
- Track: Left-handed
- Qualification: Two-year-olds
- Weight: 120 lbs. Non-winners of a race other than claiming allowed 3 lbs. Maidens allowed 5 lbs.
- Purse: US$75,000+
- Bonuses: US$22,500 for horses bred in California

The Willard L. Proctor Memorial Stakes was an American Thoroughbred horse race run annually in late May at Hollywood Park Racetrack in Inglewood, California. Open to two-year-old horses, it was contested on dirt over a distance of five and one-half furlongs. The event offered a purse of US$75,000 added plus a $22,500 bonus for horses bred in the State of California. The race was discontinued with the closure of Hollywood Park

In 1999 and 2000, the race was contested at four and one-half furlongs and at five furlongs from 2001 through 2005.

Inaugurated in 1953 as the Westchester Stakes, it was restricted to fillies for that first year only. From 1979 through 1982, the race was run as the First Act Stakes. There was no race in 1983 and in 1984 it reverted to its original Westchester Stakes title until 2000 when it was renamed in honor of long-time California trainer Willard L. Proctor, who died in 1998.

The race was on hiatus from 1985 through 1994. In 1964 and 1976 it was run in two divisions.

== Records ==
Speed Record: (at 5 1/2 furlongs)

- 1:02.97 - J P's Gusto (2010)

Most wins by a jockey:

- 6 - Laffit Pincay, Jr. (1971, 1972, 1974, 1975, 1976, 2000)

Most wins by a trainer:

- 3 - Jerry Dutton (1978, 1995, 1999)
- 3 - Michael C. Harrington (1996, 2003, 2005)
- 3 - Peter Miller (2007, 2008, 2011)

Most wins by an owner:

- 3 - Heinz Steinmann (1996, 2003, 2005)

== Winners ==
Year	Winner	Jockey	Trainer	Owner	Distance	Time	Win $
2011	Majestic City	David Flores	Peter Miller	Majestic Racing Stable, LLC	5 1/2 F	1:04.16	45,570
2010	J P's Gusto	Joe Talamo	David Hofmans	Gem Stable	5 1/2 F	1:02.97	36,960
2009	Classical Slew	Michael Baze	Douglas F. O'Neill	Joseph LaCombe	5 1/2 F	1:03.69	43,110
2008	Backbackbackgone	Corey Nakatani	Peter Miller	Gerson Racing	5 1/2 F	1:03.04	46,380
2007	Thoroughly	Corey Nakatani	Peter Miller	Gerson Racing	5 1/2 F	1:05.71	46,725
2006	Genuine Talent	Paul Atkinson	Danny Velasquez	Jocelyn Dickey McKathan	5 1/2 F	1:06.13	39,990
2005	Wild Uncle Kurt	Isaias Enriquez	Michael C. Harrington	Heinz Steinmann	5 F	0:58.85	59,535
2004	Chandtrue	Corey Nakatani	Robert B. Hess, Jr.	Harold F. Greene	5 F	0:58.10	47,205
2003	Alpenfest	Victor Espinoza	Michael C. Harrington	Heinz Steinmann	5 F	0:57.97	59,805
2002	Crowned Dancer	Alex Solis	Christopher Paasch	C. R. Cono et al.	5 F	0:57.86	40,080
2001	Expected Program	Tyler Baze	James K. Chapman	C. Chapman & T. McArthur	5 F	0:56.81	46,170
2000	Squirtle Squirt	Laffit Pincay, Jr.	Jose Garcia, Jr.	David J. Lanzman	4 1/2 F	0:51.87	46,260
1999	Always Game	Gary Stevens	Jerry Dutton	Bettis/Dutton/Yanke	4 1/2 F	0:52.00	57,270
1998	Sea Twister	Martin A. Pedroza	Brian A. Mayberry	Mr. & Mrs. Alan B. Thomas	4 1/2 F	0:51.91	39,780
1997	Majorbigtimesheet	Corey Nakatani	Jenine Sahadi	Cardiff Stud Farm	4 1/2 F	0:52.14	40,700
1996	Swiss Yodeler	Alex Solis	Michael C. Harrington	Heinz Steinmann	4 1/2 F	0:51.28	31550
1995	Distinguish Forum	Eddie Delahoussaye	Jerry Dutton	Dutton and J & J Racing	5 F	0:57.67	40,900
1984	Milord	Fernando Toro	John Gosden	Stonechurch Stable	1 1/16 M	1:41.40	23,400
1982	Via Magnum	Sandy Hawley	Richard W. Mulhall	Universal Stable	5 F	0:56.80	30,550
1981	Helen's Beau	Bill Shoemaker	Martin Valenzuela Jr.	Paladan Stable	5 F	0:58.60	32,150
1980	Sharp Hoofer	Patrick Valenzuela	Gary F. Jones	Taras Stables Ltd	5 F	0:57.40	31,700
1979	Parsec	Terry Lipham	Chay R. Knight	Les Jameson	5 F	0:58.00	25,700
1978	Roman Oblisk	Frank Olivares	Jerry Dutton	Ricci & Rosatto	5 F	0:58.20	25,800
1977	Bascom	Chuck Baltazar	Chay R. Knight	Les Jameson	5 F	0:57.40	16,900
1976	Irish Optimist	Laffit Pincay, Jr.	Jerry M. Fanning	Meryl Ann Tanz	5 F	0:56.80	13,450
1976	Mr. Davey Nay	Rudy Rosales	Kenneth Bowyer	William J. Kosterman	5 F	0:57.80	13,200
1975	Stained Glass	Laffit Pincay, Jr.	Joseph Manzi	Grown-Kaufman-Criste	5 F	0:57.60	16,100
1974	Windy Whisper	Laffit Pincay, Jr.	Bennie H. Raub	Gordon M. Jarrell	5 F	0:57.40	16,985
1973	Century's Envoy	Jerry Lambert	Lou Glauburg	M/M John J. Elmore, Sr.	5 F	0:57.40	16,550
1972	Doc Marcus	Laffit Pincay, Jr.	A. Thomas Doyle	Mrs. Harry Curland	5 F	0:57.00	17,050
1971	Step Ahead	Laffit Pincay, Jr.	A. Thomas Doyle	Mrs. Paul Blackman	5 F	0:57.60	16,850
1970	Vested Power	Jerry Lambert	Walter Greenman	Verne H. Winchell	5 F	0:58.20	14,200
1969	Sir Wiggle	Donald Pierce	Robert L. Wheeler	Nelson Bunker Hunt	5 F	0:57.60	14,200
1968	Mr. Joe F.	Jerry Lambert	Carl A. Roles	Mrs. Joseph T. Forno	5 F	0:57.60	14,500
1967	Don B.	Dean Hall	Larry W. Holt	Don B. Wood	5 F	0:58.00	14,650
1966	Tumble Wind	Bill Shoemaker	Charles E. Whittingham	Rock Spring Farm Stable	5 F	0:57.20	14,100
1965	Royal House	William Hartack	Benny Slasky	Dr. & Mrs. J. R. Smith	5 F	0:57.60	16,900
1964	Black Pool	Jack Leonard	Jimmy Jordan	Wagner Stable	5 F	0:59.00	14,725
1964	Fleet Son	Bill Shoemaker	Reggie Cornell	Mr. & Mrs. Dick Griegorian	5 F	0:58.80	14,425
1963	Wee Folk	Ismael Valenzuela	Robert L. Wheeler	J. Rukin Jelks	5 F	0:57.40	10,900
1962	Kicapu Kid	Manuel Ycaza	Hal King	Kicapu Ranch & H. King	5 F	0:57.40	11,375
1961	Snappy King	Edward Burns	Harold C. McBride	Mr. & Mrs. L. I. Nelson	5 F	0:57.80	11,175
1960	Wire Us	Alex Maese	Bob R. Roberts	Mr. & Mrs. E. D. Faeh	5 F	0:58.00	10,775
1959	British Roman	Willie Harmatz	John H. Adams	Ralph Lowe	5 F	0:57.60	11,325
1958	Finnegan	Johnny Longden	William B. Finnegan	Neil S. McCarthy	5 1/2 F	1:04.80	13,950
1957	Fleet Nasrullah	Johnny Longden	Michael E. Millerick	Fannie Hertz	5 1/2 F	1:03.40	13,350
1956	Lucky Mel	Johnny Longden	William Molter	George Lewis Stable	5 F	0:57.80	9,675
1955	Ferke	Ismael Valenzuela	C. Ralph West	Bert W. Martin	5 F	0:58.20	10,125
1954	Back Hoe	Raymond York	J. S. Jones	Mrs. Joseph C. Tomlinson	5 F	0:58.00	9,575
1953	Heather Khal	John E. Burton	Mesh Tenney	Rex C. Ellsworth	5 1/2 F	1:04.60	7,150
