= Dan L. Hendricks =

American horse trainer

Dan Hendricks
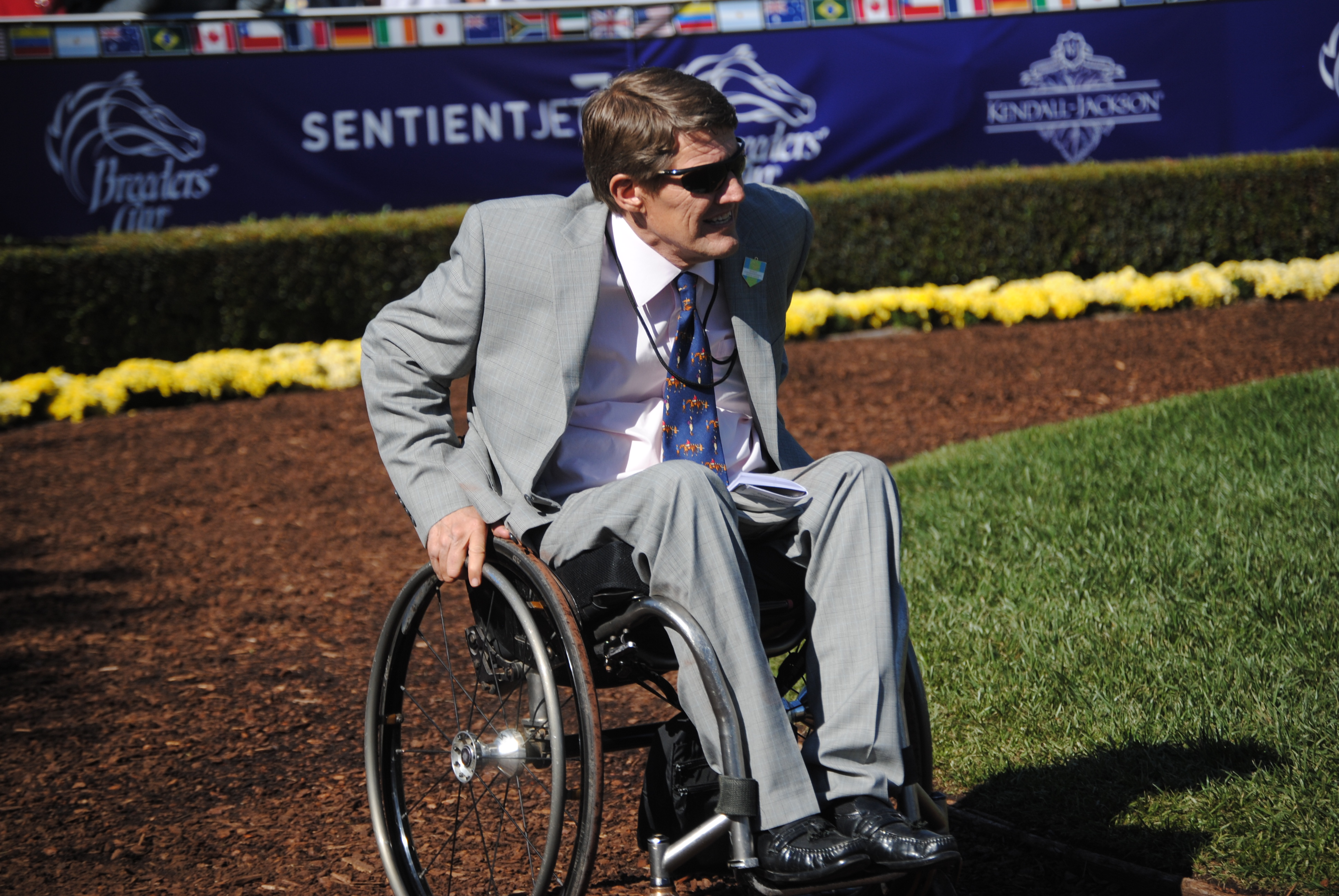
- Hendricks at the 2016 Breeders Cup

Personal information
- Born: December 5, 1958 (age 67) Los Angeles, California
- Occupation: Trainer

Horse racing career
- Sport: Horse racing
- Career wins: 711+ (ongoing)

Major racing wins
- Dahlia Handicap (1989); Del Mar Oaks (1989); Las Cienegas Handicap (1990); Ancient Title Stakes (1992); Count Fleet Sprint Handicap (1992); El Conejo Handicap (1992); Rancho Bernardo Handicap (1992); California Cup Juvenile Fillies Stakes (1993); Las Flores Handicap (1993); Potrero Grande Handicap (1993); Vanity Handicap (1995); Palomar Handicap (1997); Wilshire Handicap (1997); Hollywood Oaks (1999); Baldwin Stakes (2000); Bayakoa Handicap (2000); Lady's Secret Handicap (2000); Las Palmas Handicap (2000); Osunitas Stakes (2000); California Breeders' Champion Stakes (2003); Carleton F. Burke Handicap (2003); Hollywood Futurity (2005); Jim Murray Memorial Handicap (2005); Norfolk Stakes (2005); San Rafael Stakes (2006); Santa Anita Derby (2006); Graduation Stakes (2003); Robert B. Lewis Memorial Stakes (2006); Hollywood Derby (2007); Oak Tree - Twilight Derby (2007, 2015); San Gabriel Handicap (2007); Sunset Handicap (2007); Arcadia Handicap (2008); Fair Grounds Handicap (2008); Generous Stakes (2008); Shoemaker Mile Stakes (2008); Oak Leaf Stakes (2010); Railbird Stakes (2010); Santa Paula Stakes (2010)

Significant horses
- Brother Derek

Dan L. Hendricks (born December 5, 1958, in Los Angeles, California) is an American Thoroughbred horse racing trainer.

Hendricks took out his trainer's license in 1987 after working for Richard Mandella for nine years. On July 7, 2004, Dan was paralyzed from the waist down as the result of a motocross accident at Perris, California. Six weeks later he returned to work in a wheelchair.

During 2005 and 2006 Hendricks trained Brother Derek to major wins, including the Santa Anita Derby.
