= Wilshire Stakes =

- Class: Grade III
- Location: Santa Anita Park; Arcadia, California, United States
- Inaugurated: 1953
- Race type: Thoroughbred – Flat racing
- Website: www.santaanita.com

Race information
- Distance: 1 mile (8 furlongs)
- Surface: Turf
- Track: Left-handed
- Qualification: Fillies & mares, 4-year-olds & older
- Weight: Base weights with allowances: 4-year-olds and up: 124 lbs. 3-year-olds: 120 lbs.
- Purse: US$100,000

The Wilshire Stakes is a Grade III American Thoroughbred horse race for fillies and mares age four and older. The race runs over a distance of one mile (8 furlongs) on turf track and is scheduled annually in May at Santa Anita Park in Arcadia, California.

== History ==
The event was inaugurated on 30 June 1953 as the Wilshire Mile a one-mile race on dirt for three-year-old fillies that was won by the British bred filly Ria Rica in an upset victory in the time of 1:37 1/5 before a Tuesday crowd of 23,158.

It was not run again until 1963, when it was revived as an event called the Wilshire Handicap that included older fillies and mares over 7 furlongs. The first running of the event on turf was in 1970 as the Wilshire Stakes. In 1973 the event was run in two divisions.

Beginning with the 2014 running, it was moved to Santa Anita Park due to Hollywood Park's closure and renamed to Wilshire Stakes.

The event has had several distance changes with the current distance set at one mile in 1998.

The event was classified as a Grade III in 1975 and upgraded to Grade II in 1983. It was downgraded in 1998 to Grade III.

The 1968 and 1969 American Champion Older Female Horse Gamely is the only horse to win this event twice. In 1989 United States Racing Hall of Fame trainer Charles E. Whittingham trained all the three placegetters in the event – winner Claire Marine (IRE), Fitzwilliam Place finished second and 1987 winner Galunpe third.

== Records ==
Speed record:

- 1 mile: 1:33.03 – Enola Gray (2017)
- 1 1/16 miles: 1:39.00 – Claire Marine (IRE) (1989)

Margins:

- 4 1/2 lengths – Mademoiselle Forli (1983)

Most wins:

- 2 – Gamely (1968, 1969)

Most wins by an owner:

- 3 – William Haggin Perry (1967, 1968, 1969)

Most wins by a jockey:

- 6 – Chris McCarron (1978, 1985, 1989, 1997, 2000, 2002)

Most wins by a trainer:

- 4 – Neil D. Drysdale (1999, 2019, 2020, 2024)

== Winners ==
| Year | Winner | Age | Jockey | Trainer | Owner | Distance | Time | Purse | Grade | Ref |
|---|---|---|---|---|---|---|---|---|---|---|
At Santa Anita Park – Wilshire Stakes
| 2026 | Rashmi | 5 | Kazushi Kimura | Jonathan Thomas | Augustin Stables | 1 mile | 1:34.73 | $100,000 | III | |
| 2025 | Tirupati | 4 | Umberto Rispoli | Jonathan Thomas | Augustin Stables | 1 mile | 1:34.61 | $101,000 | III | |
| 2024 | Nadette (FR) | 5 | Hector Berrios | Neil D. Drysdale | Team Valor International | 1 mile | 1:34.16 | $102,500 | III | |
| 2023 | Macadamia (BRZ) | 5 | Tiago Pereira | Philip D'Amato | R Unicorn Stable | 1 mile | 1:33.66 | $100,500 | III | |
| 2022 | Canoodling | 4 | Juan Hernandez | Mike Puype | B4 Farms | 1 mile | 1:34.90 | $101,500 | III | |
| 2021 | Warren's Showtime | 4 | Juan Hernandez | Craig Lewis | Benjamin C. & Sally Warren | 1 mile | 1:34.29 | $101,500 | III | |
| 2020 | Toinette | 5 | Flavien Prat | Neil D. Drysdale | Ken Baca, Edward J. Hudson Jr., & Lynne Hudson | 1 mile | 1:35.20 | $100,000 | III | |
| 2019 | Simply Breathless (GB) | 4 | Flavien Prat | Neil D. Drysdale | Cloros Bloodstock | 1 mile | 1:35.50 | $101,755 | III | |
| 2018 | Storm the Hill | 4 | Rafael Bejarano | Philip D'Amato | Alastar Thoroughbred Company & Michael Valdes | 1 mile | 1:33.77 | $101,380 | III | |
| 2017 | Enola Gray | 4 | Flavien Prat | Philip D'Amato | Nicholas B. Alexander | 1 mile | 1:33.03 | $100,345 | III | |
| 2016 | Race not held | | | | | | | | | |
| 2015 | Blingismything | 5 | Tyler Baze | J. Eric Kruljac | Class Racing Stable | 1 mile | 1:37.16 | $100,250 | III | |
| 2014 | Parranda | 5 | Rafael Bejarano | Jerry Hollendorfer | G. Campbell, D. Clark, Gatto Racing, J. Hollendorfer & G. Skoda | 1 mile | 1:33.48 | $100,250 | III | |
At Hollywood Park – Wilshire Handicap
| 2013 | Halo Dolly | 5 | Rafael Bejarano | Jerry Hollendorfer | Hoefflin, Hoefflin, Hollendorfer, O'Farrell, Robin, Todaro, Schneider, Tahaj | 1 mile | 1:34.18 | $100,500 | III | |
| 2012 | Quiet Oasis (IRE) | 4 | Mario Gutierrez | Ben D. A. Cecil | J. Paul Reddam | 1 mile | 1:34.63 | $100,000 | III | |
| 2011 | Dubawi Heights (GB) | 4 | Joel Rosario | Simon Callaghan | Callaghan, Neville, McStay, Clodagh, Magnier, M.V. & Annabel Wyatt | 1 mile | 1:35.21 | $100,000 | III | |
| 2010 | Medaglia d'Amour | 4 | Alonso Quinonez | Ben D. A. Cecil | Kristina Cecil & Zillah Reddam | 1 mile | 1:34.31 | $100,000 | III | |
| 2009 | Gorgeous Goose | 4 | Corey Nakatani | Mike Puype | Mary A. Denes & Mary E. Woelfel | 1 mile | 1:34.54 | $100,000 | III | |
| 2008 | Diamond Diva (GB) | 4 | David R. Flores | James M. Cassidy | Three Chimneys Farm | 1 mile | 1:33.21 | $110,800 | III | |
| 2007 | Charm the Giant (IRE) | 5 | Michael C. Baze | Ron McAnally | Deborah McAnally | 1 mile | 1:34.16 | $111,500 | III | |
| 2006 | Heavenly Ransom | 4 | Jon Court | Thomas Ray Bell II | Mr. and Mrs. V. Meguerditchian | 1 mile | 1:33.14 | $100,000 | III | |
| 2005 | Pickle (GB) | 4 | Jon Court | Sanford Shulman | Ronald L. Charles & Clear Valley Stables | 1 mile | 1:33.85 | $109,600 | III | |
| 2004 | Spring Star (FR) | 5 | Alex O. Solis | Richard E. Mandella | Wertheimer et Frère | 1 mile | 1:33.41 | $110,900 | III | |
| 2003 | § Dublino | 4 | Kent J. Desormeaux | Laura de Seroux | Michael Klein, Robert Geringer, Marsha Naify, et al. | 1 mile | 1:33.62 | $111,000 | III | |
| 2002 | Eurolink Raindance (IRE) | 5 | Chris McCarron | Ben D. A. Cecil | Bull Market Stable | 1 mile | 1:34.31 | $106,600 | III | |
| 2001 | Tranquility Lake | 6 | Eddie Delahoussaye | Julio C. Canani | Pam & Martin Wygod | 1 mile | 1:34.69 | $108,600 | III | |
| 2000 | Tout Charmant | 4 | Chris McCarron | Ron McAnally | Stonerside Stable | 1 mile | 1:33.86 | $107,900 | III | |
| 1999 | Sapphire Ring (GB) | 4 | Gary L. Stevens | Neil D. Drysdale | The Thoroughbred Corp. | 1 mile | 1:33.80 | $108,600 | III | |
| 1998 | Shake The Yoke (GB) | 5 | Eddie Delahoussaye | Ronald W. Ellis | B. Wayne Hughes | 1 mile | 1:34.10 | $110,400 | III | |
| 1997 | Blushing Heiress | 5 | Chris McCarron | Dan L. Hendricks | Thomas M. & Marguerite F. Cavanagh | 1 1/16 miles | 1:40.95 | $108,400 | II | |
| 1996 | Pharma | 5 | Corey Nakatani | Ronald W. Ellis | Allen Paulson & Martin Wygod | 1 1/16 miles | 1:40.96 | $132,950 | II | |
| 1995 | Possibly Perfect | 5 | Kent J. Desormeaux | Robert J. Frankel | Blue Vista, Inc. | 1 1/16 miles | 1:40.37 | $132,850 | II | |
| 1994 | Skimble | 5 | Eddie Delahoussaye | Robert J. Frankel | Juddmonte Farms | 1 1/16 miles | 1:41.39 | $107,800 | II | |
| 1993 | Toussaud | 4 | Kent J. Desormeaux | John Gosden | Juddmonte Farms | 1 1/16 miles | 1:40.14 | $108,500 | II | |
| 1992 | Kostroma (IRE) | 6 | Kent J. Desormeaux | Gary F. Jones | William deBurgh, Robert Sangster & Prestonwood | 1 1/16 miles | 1:41.35 | $107,600 | II | |
| 1991 | Fire the Groom | 4 | Gary L. Stevens | Bill Shoemaker | Randall D. Hubbard | 1 1/16 miles | 1:40.00 | $108,000 | II | |
| 1990 | Reluctant Guest | 4 | Robbie Davis | Richard E. Mandella | Robert S. Folsom | 1 1/16 miles | 1:39.40 | $107,400 | II | |
| 1989 | Claire Marine (IRE) | 4 | Chris McCarron | Charles E. Whittingham | Sidney L. Port & Charles E. Whittingham | 1 1/16 miles | 1:39.00 | $107,700 | II | |
| 1988 | Chapel of Dreams | 4 | Gary L. Stevens | John Parisella | Theodore M. Sabarese | 1 1/16 miles | 1:39.40 | $109,700 | II | |
| 1987 | Galunpe (IRE) | 4 | Fernando Toro | Robert J. Frankel | Ann & Jerry Moss & Patrick P. Offenstadt | 1 1/16 miles | 1:41.00 | $129,900 | II | |
| 1986 | Outstandingly | 4 | Gary L. Stevens | Laz Barrera | Harbor View Farm | 1 1/16 miles | 1:41.60 | $127,350 | II | |
| 1985 | Johnica | 4 | Chris McCarron | Bruce Headley | Golden Eagle Farm | 1 1/16 miles | 1:40.60 | $108,100 | II | |
| 1984 | Triple Tipple | 5 | Laffit Pincay Jr. | Richard J. Cross | Fittocks Stud | 1 1/16 miles | 1:41.20 | $82,650 | II | |
| 1983 | Mademoiselle Forli | 4 | Pat Valenzuela | Charles E. Whittingham | Penowa Farms | 1 1/16 miles | 1:44.80 | $82,550 | II | Off turf |
| 1982 | Miss Huntington | 5 | Pat Valenzuela | D. Wayne Lukas | Ruth C. Bunn | 1 1/16 miles | 1:41.40 | $85,000 | III | |
| 1981 | Track Robbery | 4 | Pat Valenzuela | Robert L. Wheeler | Summa Stable | 1 1/16 miles | 1:40.80 | $81,300 | III | |
| 1980 | Wishing Well | 5 | Fernando Toro | Gary F. Jones | Mr. & Mrs. Michael Lima | 1 1/16 miles | 1:41.60 | $65,500 | III | |
| 1979 | Country Queen | 4 | Laffit Pincay Jr. | Randy Winick | M. Blum, G. Sarant, R. Winick | 1 1/16 miles | 1:40.40 | $55,600 | III | |
| 1978 | Lucie Manet | 5 | Chris McCarron | Jaime Villagomez | John & Donald Valpredo | 1 1/8 miles | 1:49.00 | $53,450 | III | |
| 1977 | Now Pending | 4 | Rudy Campas | Richard E. Mandella | Jerry Pender & Dan Stathatos | 1 1/8 miles | 1:48.80 | $56,050 | III | |
| 1976 | Miss Toshiba | 4 | Fernando Toro | Thomas A. Pratt | Robert Sangster | 1 1/8 miles | 1:49.20 | $54,800 | III | |
| 1975 | Tizna (CHI) | 6 | Jerry Lambert | Henry Moreno | Nile Financial Corp. | 1 1/8 miles | 1:48.60 | $55,800 | III | |
| 1974 | Tallahto | 4 | Laffit Pincay Jr. | Charles E. Whittingham | Howard B. Keck | 1 1/8 miles | 1:47.60 | $56,150 | Listed | |
| 1973 | Balcony's Babe | 5 | Jerry Lambert | Kenneth Bowyer | Mr E.B. & Mrs. E.W. Johnston | 1 1/8 miles | 1:48.60 | $28,500 | | Division 1 |
| 1973 | Convenience | 5 | John L. Rotz | Willard L. Proctor | Glen Hill Farm | 1 1/8 miles | 1:49.00 | $28,150 | | Division 2 |
Wilshire Stakes
| 1972 | Manta | 6 | Fernando Toro | Farrell W. Jones | Elmendorf Farm | 1 1/8 miles | 1:48.80 | $27,350 | | |
| 1971 | New Leaf | 4 | Dennis Tierney | John Longden | Pin Oak Stable | 1 1/8 miles | 1:49.00 | $28,950 | | |
| 1970 | Tanta Bella | 3 | Jerry Lambert | Maynard Krueger | Mr. & Mrs. John Valpredo | 1 1/8 miles | 1:48.80 | $22,300 | | |
Wilshire Handicap
| 1969 | § Gamely | 5 | Wayne Harris | James W. Maloney | William Haggin Perry | 7 furlongs | 1:21.00 | $22,150 | | |
| 1968 | § Gamely | 4 | Wayne Harris | James W. Maloney | William Haggin Perry | 7 furlongs | 1:21.00 | $23,150 | | |
| 1967 | Romanticism | 4 | Jerry Lambert | James W. Maloney | William Haggin Perry | 7 furlongs | 1:22.40 | $23,700 | | |
| 1966 | Poona Queen | 6 | Bill Shoemaker | Gordon C. Campbell | Mr. & Mrs. John J. Elmore | 7 furlongs | 1:22.20 | $28,500 | | |
| 1965 | Jalousie II (ARG) | 6 | Johnny Longden | Henry Moreno | Henry Moreno, Pat Sawyer & Bill Macon | 7 furlongs | 1:21.00 | $28,550 | | |
| 1964 | Researcher | 4 | Pete Moreno | Farrell W. Jones | Elmendorf Farm | 7 furlongs | 1:26.40 | $22,850 | | |
| 1963 | Edie Belle | 6 | Bill Shoemaker | Farrell W. Jones | Bresa Del Mar Ranch | 7 furlongs | 1:26.40 | $22,200 | | |
| 1954–1962 | | Race not held | | | | | | | | |
Wilshire Mile
| 1953 | Ria Rica (GB) | 3 | Billy Pearson | Hack Ross | C. H. Jones & Sons | 1 mile | 1:37.20 | $16,850 | | |

Turf Dirt
Notes:
§ Ran as part of an entry

== See also ==
- List of American and Canadian Graded races
