= Fernando Toro =

Chilean jockey

Personal information
- Born: January 31, 1941 (age 85) Santiago, Chile
- Occupation: Jockey

Horse racing career
- Sport: Horse racing
- Career wins: 3,555 (North America)

Major racing wins
- Pan American Handicap (1966); Edgemere Handicap (1967); Seagram Cup Handicap (1968); Wonder Where Stakes (1968); Tremont Stakes (1969); Widener Handicap (1969); Escondido Handicap (1970); La Jolla Mile (1970); Del Mar Oaks (1970); Cabrillo Handicap (1970); Del Mar Derby (1970); Ramona Handicap (1971); Del Mar Futurity (1971); Ramona Handicap (1971, 1972); Vanity Handicap (1971, 1976); Autumn Days Handicap (1972, 1978, 1979); Balboa Stakes (1972); California Breeders' Champion Stakes (1972, 1987); Del Mar Handicap (1972, 1974); Palos Verdes Handicap (1972); Wilshire Handicap (1972, 1976, 1977); El Cajon Stakes (1973, 1976); Inglewood Handicap (1973, 1984); Monrovia Handicap (1973); San Carlos Handicap (1973, 1977); San Vicente Stakes (1973); Malibu Stakes (1974); Oak Leaf Stakes (1974); San Clemente Stakes (1974, 1975); Santa Margarita Handicap (1974, 1976, 1984); Santa Monica Handicap (1974, 1975); American Handicap (1975 (div.1 & 2), 1982, 1989); Graduation Stakes (1975); Palomar Handicap (1975); San Felipe Stakes (1975, 1981); San Pasqual Handicap (1975, 1977); Frank E. Kilroe Mile (1976); Haggin Stakes (1976, 1977); Hawthorne Handicap (1976, 1984); Premiere Handicap (1976, 1986, 1987); Manhattan Handicap (1976); Santa Anita Oaks (1976, 1977); San Luis Obispo Handicap (1976); San Marcos Stakes (1976, 1985); Strub Stakes (1976, 1981, 1986); Sunset Handicap (1976, 1985, 1988); Ashland Stakes (1977); Beverly Hills Handicap (1977, 1978, 1983, 1984, 1986); Oceanside Stakes (1977); Eddie Read Handicap (1977); Morvich Handicap (1977, 1978, 1988); Railbird Stakes (1977); San Luis Rey Handicap (1977); Bay Meadows Handicap (1978, 1980, 1986); San Diego Handicap (1978); Santa Ana Handicap (1978, 1985); San Fernando Stakes (1978); Santa Maria Handicap (1978); Triple Bend Handicap (1978); Carleton F. Burke Handicap (1979, 1981); Dominion Day Stakes (1979); Gamely Stakes (1979, 1980); Jockey Club Cup Handicap (1979); Baldwin Stakes (1980); Santa Lucia Handicap (1980); Santa Ysabel Stakes (1980); Volante Handicap (1980); Charles H. Strub Stakes (1981); Las Cienegas Handicap (1981); Hollywood Turf Cup Stakes (1982); El Camino Real Derby (1983); Hollywood Derby 1983 (div.1 & 2); Swaps Stakes (1983); Will Rogers Stakes (1983); Longacres Derby (1984); Matriarch Stakes (1984); Willard L. Proctor Memorial Stakes (1984); San Gabriel Handicap (1985); San Gorgonio Handicap (1985); Senorita Stakes (1985); All American Handicap (1986); Arlington Million (1986); Cinema Handicap (1986); Clement L. Hirsch Turf Championship Stakes (1986); Yellow Ribbon Handicap (1986); Hawthorne Gold Cup Handicap (1987); Oak Tree Mile Stakes (1987); Laurance Armour Handicap (1987); Stars and Stripes Stakes (1987); Apple Blossom Handicap (1988); Buena Vista Handicap (1988); El Encino Stakes (1988); Louisville Budweiser Breeders Cup (1988); Milady Handicap (1988); Rampart Handicap (1988) Chilean Triple Crown wins: Clasico St. Leger (1964) Breeders' Cup wins: Breeders' Cup Mile (1984)

Racing awards
- George Woolf Memorial Jockey Award (1975)

Honors
- National Museum of Racing and Hall of Fame (2023)

Significant horses
- Ancient Title, By Land By Sea, Caucasus, Cougar II, Estrapade, Manila, Royal Heroine, Super Moment, Tizna, Wishing Well
- Updated on 24 April 2023

Fernando Toro (born January 31, 1941, in Santiago, Chile) is a retired US Hall of Fame Thoroughbred horse racing jockey about whom Santa Anita Park called one of Southern California's most successful jockeys in the 1970s and '80s.

On November 19, 1956, Fernando Toro won the first race of his riding career at the Club Hípico de Santiago in Santiago, Chile. He was the leading rider in Chile when he decided to emigrate to the United States in 1966 where he would retire from riding in 1990 having won 3,555 North American races. In 1975, Fernando Toro was voted the George Woolf Memorial Jockey Award. The award has been given annually since 1950 to a thoroughbred horse racing jockey in North America who demonstrates high standards of personal and professional conduct both on and off the racetrack.

Widely respected for his expertise in turf races, among his many successes Fernando Toro rode the filly Royal Heroine to victory in the 1984 inaugural running of the Breeders' Cup Mile.

In 2023, Toro was inducted into the National Museum of Racing and Hall of Fame as a selection by the Historic Review Committee. Since he was unable to make the journey from California to Saratoga Springs for the induction ceremony, Toro will receive his Hall of Fame jacket and plaque at Del Mar on August 19, 2023.
