= Convenience (horse) =

American-bred Thoroughbred racehorse

- Sire: Fleet Nasrullah
- Grandsire: Nasrullah
- Dam: Moment of Truth
- Damsire: Matador
- Sex: Mare
- Foaled: 1968
- Country: United States
- Colour: Bay
- Breeder: Caper Hill Farm, Inc.
- Owner: Glen Hill Farm
- Trainer: Willard L. Proctor
- Record: 35: 15-9-4
- Earnings: US$648,933

Major wins
- Vallejo Stakes (1971); Santa Paula Handicap (1972); Sequoia Handicap (1972); Vanity Handicap (1972, 1973); Hollywood Park Match race (1972); Wilshire Handicap (1973); Santa Maria Handicap (1974)

Convenience (foaled May 29, 1968 in Florida) was a Thoroughbred racing mare. She was sired by Fleet Nasrullah, a son of Nasrullah, and her dam was Moment of Truth. Bred by Caper Hill Farm, Inc. and raced by Glen Hill Farm, she was trained by Willard Proctor.

During her racing career, Convenience won fifteen of thirty-five starts and retired with earnings of $648,933. Among her wins, Convenience twice won the Grade 1 Vanity Handicap and in 1972, under jockey Jerry Lambert defeated Typecast in a $250,000 winner-take-all match race in front of 53,575 fans at Hollywood Park Racetrack.
