= Jerry Lambert (jockey) =

American jockey

Personal information
- Born: December 27, 1940 Clyde, Kansas, United States
- Died: February 23, 2015 (aged 74) Santa Ynez, California
- Occupation: Jockey

Horse racing career
- Sport: Horse racing
- Career wins: 2,535

Major racing wins
- Del Mar Debutante Stakes (1963, 1967, 1968); Ramona Handicap (1963); Oceanside Handicap (1963, 1964, 1967); Palomar Handicap (1963, 1967, 1971); Inglewood Handicap (1964, 1966, 1970, 1976); La Jolla Mile (1964, 1965, 1975); Palos Verdes Handicap (1964, 1965, 1971, 1975); San Diego Handicap (1964, 1965); San Carlos Handicap (1965, 1967, 1972); American Handicap (1965); Del Mar Oaks (1965); Harry Henson Stakes (1965, 1968); Hollywood Gold Cup (1965, 1966, 1967); Los Angeles Handicap (1965, 1967); Arcadia Handicap (1966, 1973); San Pasqual Handicap (1966, 1973); San Bernardino Handicap (1966, 1971, 1972); Lakes and Flowers Handicap (1966, 1975); Del Mar Inaugural Handicap (1967, 1968); Railbird Stakes (1967, 1968); Vanity Handicap (1967, 1972); Wilshire Handicap (1967, 1970, 1973, 1975); Del Mar Derby (1968, 1970, 1973); Del Mar Futurity (1968); San Felipe Stakes (1968, 1970); San Luis Rey Handicap (1968 (2), 1970); San Marcos Stakes (1968); Santa Ana Handicap (1968, 1970, 1971); Santa Barbara Handicap (1968); Santa Ysabel Stakes (1968); Westchester Stakes (1968, 1970, 1973); Cabrillo Handicap (1969); Honeymoon Handicap (1969); Malibu Stakes (1969, 1972); Sequoia Handicap (1970, 1976); Baldwin Stakes (1970); Californian Stakes (1970); Hollywood Oaks (1970); Monrovia Handicap (1970, 1976); San Clemente Stakes (1970); San Luis Obispo Handicap (1970); Premiere Handicap (1970, 1971); Gamely Stakes (1971); Milady Handicap (1971); Santa Maria Handicap (1971); Senorita Stakes (1971); Sunset Handicap (1971); Hollywood Invitational Turf Handicap (1972, 1977); Henry P. Russell Handicap (1972); Las Flores Handicap (1972); Las Palmas Handicap (1972); Norfolk Stakes (1972); Oak Leaf Stakes (1972); Hollywood Juvenile Championship Stakes (1973); Bing Crosby Handicap (1975); Eddie Read Stakes (1975); Hawthorne Handicap (1975); Junior Miss Stakes (1975); Morvich Handicap (1975); Oak Tree Derby (1975); Rancho Bernardo Handicap (1975); San Fernando Stakes (1976); California Breeders' Champion Stakes (1977); Speakeasy Stakes (1977)

Racing awards
- George Woolf Memorial Jockey Award (1971); Leading jockey at Ak-Sar-Ben (1963); Leading jockey at Turf Paradise (1963); Leading jockey at Del Mar (1967); Leading jockey at Santa Anita (1968); Leading jockey at Oak Tree (1972)

Significant horses
- Baffle, Convenience, Jumping Hill; Native Diver, Quicken Tree, Tizna, Typecast, Vigors

Jerry Lambert (December 27, 1940 – February 23, 2015) was an American jockey in the sport of Thoroughbred horse racing best known as the jockey of Hall of Fame inductee, Native Diver.

Lambert accomplished what Breeders' Cup Inc. calls "one of California’s top racing achievements" when he rode Native Diver to victory in three straight Hollywood Gold Cups from 1965 through 1967.

In 1963, Lambert was the leading jockey at Ak-Sar-Ben Racetrack meet in Omaha, Nebraska, as well as at Turf Paradise Race Course meet that same year. In 1967, he won a riding title at Del Mar Racetrack, then in 1968 at Santa Anita Park and at the Oak Tree Racing Association meet in 1972.

In the June 3, 1972, Vanity Handicap at Hollywood Park Racetrack, Lambert rode Convenience to a half-length victory over the heavily favored Typecast, who had beaten Convenience by six lengths in the May 18 Milady Handicap on the same track. Those results prompted owners Leonard Lavin and Fletcher Jones to agree to a $250,000 winner-take-all event match race that was the richest match race at that point in American history. On June 17, 1972, in front of 53,575 patrons at Hollywood Park Racetrack, Lambert and Convenience won by a head over the favored Typecast. One week later, Lambert rode Typecast to victory over Shoemaker and Cougar in the Hollywood Invitational Turf Handicap.

During his career, Lambert won 54 stakes races at Hollywood Park Racetrack, 30 stakes races at Del Mar Racetrack and 42 stakes races at Santa Anita Park

In 1971, Lambert was voted the George Woolf Memorial Jockey Award, given to the thoroughbred jockey in North America who demonstrates high standards of personal and professional conduct, on and off the racetrack.

Retired, in later years Lambert helped break horses for Rich and Gaby Sulpizio's Magali Farms in Santa Ynez, California. On October 2, 2009, the HRTV show "Inside Information" profiled and interviewed Lambert at Magali Farms. He died on February 23, 2015, aged 74. Lacey Rene Lambert, his daughter, survived him.
