= San Carlos Stakes =

- Class: Grade III
- Location: Santa Anita Park; Arcadia, California, United States
- Inaugurated: 1935
- Race type: Thoroughbred – Flat racing
- Website: www.santaanita.com

Race information
- Distance: 7 furlong sprint
- Surface: Dirt
- Track: Left-handed
- Qualification: Three-years-old & up
- Weight: Base weights: 3-year-olds – 118 lbs, 4-year-olds and up – 125 lbs with allowances
- Purse: US$200,000 (since 2019)

The San Carlos Stakes is an American Thoroughbred horse race once held during the third week of February at Santa Anita Park in Arcadia, California, but now run in March. The Grade III stakes race is open to horses, aged three and up, willing to race seven furlongs on the dirt and currently offers a purse of $200,000.

Inaugurated in 1935 as the San Carlos Handicap, it was raced at a distance of 1 1/16 miles through 1939. It was run in both January and December 1949. It became known as the San Carlos Stakes beginning with its 2012 running.

It wasn't raced due to World War II between 1942 and 1945.

== Records ==
Speed record: (at current distance of 7 furlongs)

- 1:20.2 – Flying Paster (1981)

Most wins:

- 2 – Autocrat (1948, 1949)
- 2 – Porterhouse (1955, 1956)
- 2 – Native Diver (1965, 1967)
- 2 – Rising Market (1969, 1970)
- 2 – Surf Cat (2006, 2008)
- 2 – Sahara Sky (2013,2014)

Most wins by a jockey:

- 8 – Laffit Pincay Jr. (1969, 1970, 1974, 1975, 1976, 1980, 1984, 1986)

Most wins by a trainer:

- 6 – Charles Whittingham (1955, 1956, 1960, 1971, 1988, 1993)
- 6 - Bob Baffert (2012, 2017, 2018, 2022, 2025, 2026)

Most wins by an owner:

- 2 – Alfred G. Vanderbilt II (1936, 1954)
- 2 – Baroni & Battilana (1948, 1949)
- 2 – Fred W. Hooper (1963, 1964)
- 2 – M/M Louis K. Shapiro (1965, 1967)
- 2 – M/M Bert W. Martin (1966, 1969)
- 2 – Aase Headley/Marsha Naify (2006, 2008)

== Winners ==
Year	Winner	Age	Jockey	Trainer	Owner	Distance	Time	Winner's earnings
2026	Cornucopian	4	Juan J. Hernandez	Bob Baffert	SF Racing, Starlight Racing, Madaket Stables, Stonestreet Stables, Bashor Racing, Determined Stables, Robert E. Masterson, Tom J. Ryan, Waves Edge Capital, Catherine Donovan & Hill 'n' Dale Equine Holdings-Lessee	7 F	1:20.71	$100,000
2025	Pilot Commander	4	Juan J. Hernandez	Bob Baffert	CSLR Racing Partners LLC	7 F	1:23.98	$100,000
2024	The Chosen Vron	5	Hector Isaac Berrios	J. Eric Kruljac	Sondereker Racing LLC, Krujac. J. Eric, Robert S. and Thornburgh, Richard	7 F	1:20.96	$100,000
2023	Spirit of Makena	5	Joe Bravo	George Papaprodromou	Kristine Chandler	7 F	1:22.60	$200,000
2022	Cezanne	5	Flavien Prat	Bob Baffert	Hill'N'Dale Equine Holdings Inc, and St. Elias Stables LLC	7 F	1:23.45	$200,000
2021	Brickyard Ride	4	Alexis Centeno	Craig Lewis	Alfred Pais	7 F	1:21.51	$120,000
2020	Flagstaff	6	Victor Espinoza	John W. Sadler	Lane's End Racing, Hronis Racing	7 F	1:22.64	$120,000
2019	St. Joe Bay	7	Victor Espinoza	John W. Sadler	Hronis Racing LLC	7 F	1:24.06	$120,000
2018	American Anthem	4	Mike Smith	Bob Baffert	WinStar Farm LLC, Head of Plains Partners LLC, China Horse Club, SF Racing LLC	7 F	1:22.12	$150,000
2017	Danzing Candy	4	Mike Smith	Bob Baffert	Halo Farms/Jim Bashor/Dianne Bashor	7 F	1:21.17	$150,000
2016	Kobe's Back	5	Gary Stevens	Peter Eurton	C R K Stable	7 F	1:22.20	$180,000
2015	Wild Dude	5	Rafael Bejarano	Jerry Hollendorfer	Hollendorfer/Smith	7 F	1:21.91	$150,000
2014	Sahara Sky	6	Joel Rosario	Jerry Hollendorfer	Hollendorfer/Sweetwater Stable	7 F	1:20.84	$150,000
2013	Sahara Sky	5	Joseph Talamo	Jerry Hollendorfer	Hollendorfer/Sweetwater Stable	7 F	1:21.28	$120,000
2012	The Factor	4	Martin Garcia	Bob Baffert	Bolton/Fog City Stable	7 F	1:20.56	$120,000
2011	Smiling Tiger	4	Joel Rosario	Jeffrey L. Bonde	Alan Klein & Philip Lebherz	7 F	1:20.30	$90,000
2010	Bob Black Jack	5	David Flores	James Kasparoff	Tim Kasparoff/Jeff Harmon	7 F	1:21.05	$90,000
2009	Georgie Boy	4	Garrett Gomez	Kathy Walsh	George H. Schwary	7 F	1:21.85	$90,000
2008	Surf Cat	6	Alex Solis	Bruce Headley	Aase Headley/Marsha Naify	7 F	1:21.62	$90,000
2007	Latent Heat	4	Edgar Prado	Robert J. Frankel	Juddmonte Farms	7 F	1:21.11	$90,000
2006	Surf Cat	4	Alex Solis	Bruce Headley	Aase Headley/Marsha Naify	7 F	1:22.09	$90,000
2005	Hasty Kris	8	René Douglas	John W. Sadler	CRK Stables	7 F	1:21.42	$90,000
2004	Pico Central	5	David Flores	Paulo Lobo	Christina Garlipp	7 F	1:21.16	$90,000
2003	Aldebaran	5	Jose Valdivia Jr.	Robert J. Frankel	Flaxman Holdings	7 F	1:21.53	$120,000
2002	Snow Ridge	4	Mike E. Smith	D. Wayne Lukas	Overbrook Farm	7 F	1:22.02	$90,000
2001	Kona Gold	7	Alex Solis	Bruce Headley	Headley, Molasky & Molasky	7 F	1:21.35	$90,000
2000	Son Of A Pistol	8	Garrett Gomez	Bruce Headley	B.B.C. Stables et al.	7 F	1:22.11	$$96,930
1999	Big Jag	6	Jose Valdivia Jr.	Tim Pinfield	Julius Zolezzi	7 F	1:21.18	$90,000
1998	Reality Road	6	Chris McCarron	Craig Dollase	Pete & Dorothy Pellegrino	7 F	1:21.62	$100,530
1997	Northern Afleet	4	Chris McCarron	David Hofmans	Anderson & Waranch	7 F	1:21.45	$97,700
1996	Kingdom Found	6	Chris McCarron	Gary F. Jones	Dilbeck Family Trust	7 F	1:22.23	$98,850
1995	Softshoe Sure Shot	9	Alex Solis	Bruce Headley	Johnston et al.	7 F	1:21.46	$91,600
1994	Cardmania	8	Ed Delahoussaye	Derek Meredith	Jean Couvercelle	7 F	1:21.23	$63,900
1993	Sir Beaufort	6	Chris McCarron	Charles Whittingham	Victoria Calantoni	7 F	1:22.22	$62,900
1992	Answer Do	6	Gary Stevens	Lyman Rollins	Charles F. Heider	7 F	1:21.23	$63,700
1991	Farma Way	4	Gary Stevens	D. Wayne Lukas	Quarter B Farm	7 F	1:21.40	$63,500
1990	Raise a Stanza	4	Russell Baze	Jay M. Robbins	Jack Kent Cooke	7 F	1:21.60	$64,500
1989	Cherokee Colony	4	Rafael Meza	Christopher Speckert	Buckland Farm	7 F	1:20.60	$62,800
1988	Epidaurus	6	Pat Valenzuela	Charles Whittingham	Howard B. Keck	7 F	1:22.00	$63,500
1987	Zany Tactics	6	Jack Kaenel	Blake R. Heap	Vera C. Brunette	7 F	1:22.40	$65,600
1986	Phone Trick	4	Laffit Pincay Jr.	Richard Mandella	De Angelis et al.	7 F	1:20.80	$78,200
1985	Debonaire Junior	4	Chris McCarron	Noble Threewitt	Jack D. Rogers	7 F	1:21.60	$64,300
1984	Danebo	5	Laffit Pincay Jr.	Laz Barrera	Aaron U. Jones	7 F	1:21.00	$54,900
1983	Kangroo Court	6	Joe Steiner	Johnny Longden	Hazel Longden	7 F	1:21.00	$49,550
1982	Solo Guy	4	Bill Shoemaker	Laurie Anderson	Gordon Hall	7 F	1:20.80	$60,700
1981	Flying Paster	5	Chris McCarron	Gordon C. Campbell	Bernard J. Ridder	7 F	1:20.20	$51,550
1980	Handsomeness	4	Laffit Pincay Jr.	Laz Barrera	Harbor View Farm	7 F	1:24.00	$49,100
1979	O Big Al	4	Darrel McHargue	Robert J. Frankel	Al or Mildred Ross	7 F	1:22.20	$40,800
1978	Double Discount	5	Francisco Mena	Melvin F. Stute	The Hat Ranch	7 F	1:22.00	$32,650
1977	Uniformity	5	Fernando Toro	Willard L. Proctor	Glen Hill Farm	7 F	1:21.60	$34,050
1976	No Bias	6	Laffit Pincay Jr.	Harold Hodosh	M/M Harold Hodosh	7 F	1:21.80	$32,200
1975	Ancient Title	5	Laffit Pincay Jr.	Keith L. Stucki Sr.	Ethel Kirkland	7 F	1:21.40	$37,750
1974	Royal Owl	5	Laffit Pincay Jr.	Laz Barrera	Royal Oak Farm et al.	7 F	1:23.40	$35,600
1973	Crusading †	5	Fernando Toro	Tom Pratt	Dr. J. Temple	7 F	1:20.80	$33,850
1972	Kfar Tov	4	Jerry Lambert	John W. Pappalardo	Billrick Stable	7 F	1:21.40	$35,450
1971	Ack Ack	5	Bill Shoemaker	Charles Whittingham	Cain Hoy Stable	7 F	1:21.00	$34,150
1970	Rising Market	6	Laffit Pincay Jr.	Ted Saladin	Westerly Stud	7 F	1:21.00	$24,700
1969	Rising Market	5	Laffit Pincay Jr.	Ted Saladin	M/M Bert W. Martin	7 F	1:22.60	$34,350
1968	Suteki	4	Walter Blum	Steve Ippolito	Jacnot Stable	7 F	1:22.00	$34,150
1967	Native Diver	8	Jerry Lambert	Buster Millerick	M/M Louis K. Shapiro	7 F	1:22.00	$39,550
1966	Cupid	5	Bobby Ussery	Ted Saladin	M/M Bert W. Martin	7 F	1:22.00	$38,600
1965	Native Diver	6	Jerry Lambert	Buster Millerick	M/M Louis K. Shapiro	7 F	1:21.40	$36,150
1964	Admiral's Voyage	5	Braulio Baeza	Julius E. Tinsley	Fred W. Hooper	7 F	1:22.00	$36,600
1963	Crozier	5	Braulio Baeza	Julius E. Tinsley	Fred W. Hooper	7 F	1:21.20	$38,600
1962	Four-and-Twenty	4	Johnny Longden	Vance Longden	Alberta Ranches, Ltd.	7 F	1:22.20	$38,750
1961	First Balcony	4	Manuel Ycaza	Melvin F. Stute	M/M R. O. Schulze	7 F	1:22.20	$36,100
1960	Clandestine	5	Manuel Ycaza	Charles Whittingham	C. Z. Guest & C. H. Wacker	7 F	1:21.80	$31,300
1959	Hillsdale	4	Tommy Barrow	Martin L. Fallon Jr.	Clarence W. Smith	7 F	1:21.80	$33,300
1958	Seaneen	4	William Harmatz	William B. Finnegan	Neil S. McCarthy	7 F	1:22.20	$37,000
1957	Duc De Fer	6	Ralph Neves	Monte S. Parke	J. Warfield Rodgers	7 F	1:23.40	$13,000
1956	Porterhouse	5	Eddie Arcaro	Charles Whittingham	Llangollen Farm	7 F	1:22.80	$14,650
1955	Porterhouse	4	Eddie Arcaro	Charles Whittingham	Llangollen Farm	7 F	1:22.40	$14,200
1954	Find	4	Eric Guerin	William C. Winfrey	Alfred G. Vanderbilt II	7 F	1:25.20	$14,300
1953	Blue Reading	6	Billy Pearson	Robert H. McDaniel	Clement L. Hirsch	7 F	1:23.40	$14,350
1952	To Market	4	Eddie Arcaro	William J. Hirsch	Sam A. Mason II	7 F	1:24.00	$17,100
1951	Bolero	5	Eddie Arcaro	Frank E. Childs	Abe Hirschberg	7 F	1:21.00	$41,300
1950	Manyunk †	4	Eric Guerin	Allen Drumheller	Foster & Collins	7 F	1:23.40	$42,050
1949	Autocrat	8	Jimmy Nichols	Albert A. Baroni	A. A. Baroni & Anthony Battilana	7 F	1:25.80	$41,550
1948	Autocrat	7	Anthony Skoronski	Albert A. Baroni	A. A. Baroni & Anthony Battilana	7 F	1:22.40	$42,500
1947	Texas Sandman	6	Melvin Peterson	Earl H. Sorrell	W. D. Rorex	7 F	1:22.80	$45,150
1946	Sirde	5	John Gilbert	Carl A. Roles	Ada L. Rice	7 F	1:23.00	$20,380
1941	Gen'l Manager	4	Ralph Neves	Donald Jefferson	William B. Simpson	7 F	1:24.40	$10,000
1940	Specify	5	Carroll Bierman	Albert A. Baroni	Albert A. Baroni	7 F	1:23.40	$9,350
1939	Kayak II	4	John Adams	Tom Smith	Charles S. Howard	11/16 M	1:42.40	$10,050
1938	Pompoon	4	John Gilbert	Johnny Loftus	Jerome H. Loucheim	11/16 M	1:45.00	$4,600
1937	Chanceview	5	Red Pollard	F. Burke	John J. Flanagan	11/16 M	1:45.60	$4,625
1936	Discovery	5	John Bejshak	Bud Stotler	Alfred G. Vanderbilt II	11/16 M	1:45.40	$4,025
1935	Jabot	4	Alfred Robertson	John A. Healey	C. V. Whitney	11/16 M	1:42.80	$5,225

- † In 1973, Kennedy Road won the race but was disqualified from first to second.
  † Race run on December 31, 1949.
