= Gary F. Jones =

American horse trainer (1944–2020)

Gary Jones
Personal information
- Born: June 16, 1944 Long Beach, California, U.S.
- Died: October 11, 2020 (aged 76) Del Mar, California, U.S.
- Occupation: Trainer

Horse racing career
- Sport: Horse racing
- Career wins: 1,465

Major racing wins
- San Antonio Handicap (1976); San Pasqual Handicap (1976); San Fernando Stakes (1979, 1992); Autumn Days Handicap (1979, 1986); Westchester Stakes (1980); Wilshire Handicap (1980, 1992); La Brea Stakes (1982); Balboa Stakes (1983, 1992); El Encino Stakes (1983, 1987, 1988); Hollywood Futurity (1983, 1990); Malibu Stakes (1983); Norfolk Stakes (1983); Providencia Stakes (1983, 1991, 1992, 1996); San Felipe Stakes (1984); Santa Barbara Handicap (1984, 1992, 1996); Palomar Handicap (1985, 1993, 1995); Marlboro Cup Invitational Handicap (1986); Oaklawn Handicap (1986, 1992); Widener Handicap (1986); Del Mar Mile Handicap (1987); Fayette Stakes (1987); Hawthorne Handicap (1987, 1993); Oak Tree Derby (1987); Apple Blossom Handicap (1988); La Cañada Stakes (1988); Santa Maria Handicap (1988); Fantasy Stakes (1989); Silver Belles Handicap (1990); NYRA Mile (1990); San Diego Handicap (1990, 1994); Las Palmas Handicap (1991); Monrovia Handicap (1991); Pacific Classic Stakes (1991); Santa Ana Handicap (1991); Sunset Handicap (1991); Yellow Ribbon Stakes (1991); Beverly D. Stakes (1992); John Henry Handicap (1992); San Simeon Handicap (1992, 1994, 1996); San Gabriel Handicap (1992); San Marcos Stakes (1992); Santa Anita Handicap (1992, 1994); Strub Stakes (1992); A Gleam Handicap (1993); Buena Vista Handicap (1993); Del Mar Futurity (1993); Hollywood Gold Cup (1993); Miesque Stakes (1993); Santa Catalina Stakes (1993); San Francisco Mile Stakes (1993); San Vicente Stakes (1993); Santa Monica Stakes (1993); Vernon O. Underwood Stakes (1993); El Rincon Handicap (1994); Hollywood Oaks (1994); Las Virgenes Stakes (1994); Mother Goose Stakes (1994); Santa Anita Oaks (1994); Santa Ynez Stakes (1994); Harold C. Ramser Sr. Handicap (1995); Santa Ysabel Stakes (1995); San Carlos Handicap (1996)

Honours
- National Museum of Racing and Hall of Fame (2014)

Significant horses
- Best Pal, Kostroma, Lakeway, Quiet American, Stuka, Turkoman, Wishing Well

Gary F. Jones (June 16, 1944 – October 11, 2020) was a trainer of Thoroughbred racehorses whose career began in 1974 and ended with his retirement at the end of July, 1996 having earned $52,672,611 in purses and the winner of 1,465 races including 102 graded stakes.

Gary Jones was elected to the United States Racing Hall of Fame in 2014.

== Career ==
Jones trained 104 stakes-winning horses, including Turkoman, the 1986 American Champion Older Male Horse. Jones won 15 meet titles on the Southern California circuit, including four at Santa Anita Park, where he ranks sixth all time in wins (576) and seventh in stakes victories (72). He set a record with 47 wins at Santa Anita in 1976, surpassing the previous standard of 44 established by his father, Farrell Jones. At Hollywood Park Racetrack, Jones ranks 13th all time in wins (463) and 10th in stakes victories (58). He also won 17 stakes at Del Mar, including the inaugural Pacific Classic Stakes with Hall of Famer Best Pal in 1991.

Jones guided Turkoman to victories in the Marlboro Cup, Widener Handicap and Oaklawn Handicap in his 1986 championship season. Jones twice won the signature handicap in California, the Santa Anita Handicap, with Best Pal and Stuka. Along with the Pacific Classic and Santa Anita Handicap, Jones trained Best Pal to wins in the Oaklawn Handicap, Hollywood Gold Cup, Swaps Stakes and Strub Stakes.

Jones sent out Time to Explode to equal a world record of 1:19 2/5 at Hollywood Park and conditioned Beautiful Glass to a five-furlong track mark of :55 4.5 at that same track. Other major victories for Jones include the Mother Goose, Santa Barbara Handicap, Hollywood Oaks, Del Mar Futurity, Hollywood Futurity, Yellow Ribbon, Apple Blossom Handicap, San Antonio Handicap, La Brea, San Felipe, Santa Anita Oaks, NYRA Mile, Milady Handicap, Fantasy, Californian and Norfolk.

Among the outstanding horses trained by Gary Jones were Hall of Fame inductee, Best Pal, Turkoman who was voted the Eclipse Award as the 1986 American Champion Older Male Horse, and Kostroma, who set a 1 1/8-mile turf world record of 1:43 4/5 in winning the Las Palmas Handicap.

Other notable horses trained by Jones include Quiet American, Wishing Well, Lakeway, By Land by Sea, Fali Time, Radar Ahead, Eleven Stitches and Lightning Mandate. He died on October 11, 2020.
