= Baldwin Stakes =

- Class: Grade III
- Location: Santa Anita Park; Arcadia, California, United States
- Inaugurated: 1968
- Race type: Thoroughbred – Flat racing
- Website: www.santaanita.com

Race information
- Distance: 5.5 furlongs
- Surface: Turf
- Track: Left-handed
- Qualification: Three-year-olds
- Weight: Assigned
- Purse: $100,000

The Baldwin Stakes is an American Thoroughbred horse race held annually in early March at Santa Anita Park in Arcadia, California. A Grade III event for three-year-old horses, it is contested on turf at a distance of five and one-half furlongs, since 2020.

The race was transferred to Santa Anita's dirt track in 1979, 1982, 1983, 1986, 1991, 1992, 1995, 2000, 2001, 2005 and 2006. It was run in two divisions in 1968 and again in 1988.

== Records ==
Speed record: (on turf)

- 1:11.96 – Desert code (2007)

Most wins by an owner:

- 2 – Mr./Mrs. Howard B. Keck (1968, 1969)

Most wins by a jockey:

- 5 – Ed Delahoussaye (1982, 1988, 1989, 1995, 1998)

Most wins by a trainer:

- 3 – Charles Whittingham (1968, 1969, 1971)

== Winners ==
Year	Winner	Jockey	Trainer	Owner	Time
2009	Battle of Hastings	Tyler Baze	Jeff Mullins	Michael House	1:11.86
2008	Ten Meropa	Tyler Baze	Ral Ayers	A and R Stables	1:13.09
2007	Desert Code	Richard Migliore	David Hofmans	Tarabilla Farms, Inc.	1:11.96
2006	Fast Parade	Garrett Gomez	Peter Miller	James McIngvale	1:15.11
2005	High Standards	Edgar Prado	Martin F. Jones	Harris Farms	1:16.16
2004	Seattle Borders	Alex Solis	Robert J. Frankel	Edmund A. Gann	1:14.09
2003	Buddy Gil	Gary Stevens	Jeff Mullins	Desperado Stables et al.	1:12.56
2002	Shuffling Kid	Pat Valenzuela	Michael Machowsky	Blahut et al.	1:13.30
2001	Skip To The Stone	Corey Nakatani	Mike R. Mitchell	Greystone Racing	1:16.29
2000	Fortifier	Brice Blanc	Dan L. Hendricks	Howell S. Wynne	1:16.79
1999	American Spirit	Emile Ramsammy	Bob Baffert	Donald R. Dizney	1:13.93
1998	Wrekin Pilot	Ed Delahoussaye	James M. Cassidy	Southern Nevada Racing	1:13.32
1997	Latin Dancer	Corey Black	Randy Bradshaw	Siegel family	1:14.48
1996	Sandtrap	Corey Nakatani	Ben D. A. Cecil	Robert E. Hibbert	1:15.03
1995	Sierra Diablo	Ed Delahoussaye	Mark A. Hennig	Lee & Debi Lewis	1:15.36
1994	Silver Music	Chris Antley	Wallace Dollase	Lauren Cohen	1:13.76
1993	Future Storm	Kent Desormeaux	Robert J. Frankel	Antonio Balzarini	1:15.02
1992	Reckless Ruckus	Pat Valenzuela	Craig C. Lewis	Connelly et al.	1:17.28
1991	What A Spell	David Flores	Craig C. Lewis	Jim Ford, Inc. et al.	1:16.20
1990	Farma Way	Ray Sibille	Neil Boyce	Quarter B Farm	1:13.80
1989	Tenacious Tom	Ed Delahoussaye	Ross Fenstermaker	Dante family	1:14.80
1988	Exclusive Nureyev	Ed Delahoussaye	Hector O. Palma	Ginji Yasuda	1:14.40
1988	Dr. Brent	Alex Solis	Morris Soriano	Braverman & Colvin	1:15.00
1987	Chime Time	Pat Valenzuela	John W. Sadler	King Bros/Miramar Stable	1:15.00
1986	Jetting Home	Darrel McHargue	Tom Richardson	Mrs. J. K. Ferguson	1:17.40
1985	Knighthood	Gary Stevens	Steve Morguelan	Welcome Farm	1:14.80
1984	Debonaire Junior	Chris McCarron	Noble Threewitt	Jack D. Rogers	1:14.40
1983	Total Departure	Laffit Pincay, Jr.	D. Wayne Lukas	Rebalot	1:15.20
1982	Remember John	Ed Delahoussaye	Darrell Vienna	Mr. & Mrs. J. Sheridan	1:15.20
1981	Descaro	Darrel McHargue	Lou Carno	Barbara Kolbe	1:14.60
1980	Corvette Chris	Fernando Toro	Gerry Belanger	Edward B. Seedhouse	1:13.60
1979	To B. Or Not	Chuck Baltazar	Larry J. Sterling	Bohm Stables	1:15.60
1978	B. W. Turner	Donald Pierce	Ross Fenstermaker	Fred W. Hooper	1:14.00
1977	Current Concept	Sandy Hawley	Jerry Dutton	Cardiff Stud Farm	1:13.20
1976	Gaelic Christian	Rudy Rosales	Ken Bowyer	Kama Farms, Inc.	1:13.60
1975	Uniformity	Sandy Hawley	Willard L. Proctor	Glen Hill Farm	1:13.20
1974	Battery E.	Laffit Pincay, Jr.	Keith L. Stucki	Diamond M Ranch	1:14.00
1973	Bensadream	Donald Pierce	Buster Millerick	Hodges & Osher	1:14.00
1972	Finalista	Laffit Pincay, Jr.	Linwood J. Brooks	Frazee & Frazee	1:13.80
1971	Restless Runner	Eddie Belmonte	Charles Whittingham	Llangollen Farm Stable	1:13.20
1970	Smugglin George	Jerry Lambert	P. Noordwal	Dr. & Mrs. G. J. Shima	1:13.00
1969	Tell	Bill Shoemaker	Charles Whittingham	Mrs. Howard B. Keck	1:12.80
1968	Royal Fols	Willie Harmatz	Cecil Jolly	Royal Oaks Farm et al.	1:12.80
1968	Fiddle Isle	Johnny Sellers	Charles Whittingham	Howard B. Keck	1:13.40
