= California Cup Classic =

The California Cup Classic is an American thoroughbred horse race run annually at Santa Anita Park in Arcadia, California during its Oak Tree Racing Association meet in the fall of the year. It is raced over a distance of 1 1/8 miles (1.8 km) on dirt and is open to horses three-year-olds and up bred in the state of California. As of 2015, it offers a purse of $250,000 and a trophy.

The California Cup Classic is part of the "California Cup Day" series of races intended to call attention to, and to honor, the California Thoroughbred racing and breeding industry.

== Past winners ==
- 2014 California Chrome
- 2013 Tiz a Mischief
- 2012 - Lucky Primo (Tyler Baze)
- 2011 - Norvsky (Rafael Bejarano)
- 2010 - Soul Candy (Rafael Bejarano)
- 2009 - Bold Chieftain (Russell Baze)
- 2008 - Mr. Chairman (Michael Baze)
- 2007 - Bold Chieftain (Russell Baze)
- 2006 - Texcess
- 2005 - McCann's Mojave
- 2004 - Cozy Guy
- 2003 - Tizbud
- 2002 - Calkins Road
- 2001 - Irisheyesareflying
- 2000 - Sky Jack
- 1999 - Bagshot
- 1998 - BudroyaleStraub-Rubens
- 1997 - Awesome Daze
- 1996 - Megan's Interco
- 1995 - Luthier Fever
- 1994 - College Town
- 1993 - Best Pal
- 1992 - June's Reward
- 1991 - Charmonnier
- 1990 - My Sonny Boy
