= Typecast (horse) =

American-bred Thoroughbred racehorse

- Sire: Prince John
- Grandsire: Princequillo
- Dam: Journalette
- Damsire: Summer Tan
- Sex: Mare
- Foaled: 1966
- Country: United States
- Colour: Bay
- Breeder: Nuckols Bros.
- Owner: Westerly Stud Farms
- Trainer: A. Thomas Doyle
- Record: 57: 21-12-9
- Earnings: $535,567

Major wins
- Las Palmas Handicap (1971); Gamely Handicap (1972); Milady Handicap (1972); Santa Monica Handicap (1972); Hollywood Invitational Turf Handicap (1972); Sunset Handicap (1972); Man o' War Stakes (1972)

Awards
- American Champion Older Female Horse (1972)

Honours
- Typecast Stakes at Hollywood Park Racetrack (1977–1989)
- Last updated on 25 April 2021\

Typecast (foaled April 10, 1966) was an American Champion Thoroughbred racehorse noted for her ability to win races at both short and very long distances.

== Background ==
Bred by Nuckols Bros. of Midway, Kentucky, she was out of the mare Journalette and sired by Prince John, a son of the very important sire Princequillo. Purchased and raced by Westerly Stud Farms of Santa Ynez, California, Typecast was conditioned for racing by Tommy Doyle.

== Racing career ==
A late developer, Typecast began to show contending form in 1971 at age five when she ran second in both the Beverly Hills and Ramona Handicaps and won the Las Palmas Handicap. She was six years old when she had her Champion season in which she won at both short and very long distances. In 1972, she won important races at her home base in California including the Gamely, Milady and Santa Monica Handicaps, all run at distances between seven and eight and a half furlongs. However, Typecast had stiff competition that year in California's filly ranks from the 1971 U.S. Champion 3-year-old filly Turkish Trousers, who beat her in the Santa Maria and Santa Margarita Handicaps, plus from Convenience, who beat her in the 1972 Vanity Handicap. With much talk by racing fans and the media as to who was the best filly, on June 17, 1972, a 1 1/8-mile (1.8 km) Match race was held at Hollywood Park Racetrack. With a $250,000 winner-take-all purse at stake, 53,575 spectators watched Typecast and Bill Shoemaker lose to Convenience and Jerry Lambert by a nose.

Typecast then won over colts in the 1 1/2-mile (2.4 km) Hollywood Invitational Turf Handicap and defeated colts again at two miles in the Sunset Handicap. Her handlers also sent her to New York where she took on the colts again, finishing second in the Manhattan Handicap and winning the prestigious Man o' War Stakes.

== Honors ==
Typecast's 1972 performances earned her American Champion Older Female Horse honors, but Westerly Stud Farms' owner Fletcher Jones did not live to see it. The forty-one-year-old co-founder of Computer Sciences Corporation died on November 7, 1972, when the plane he was piloting crashed into a hillside near the farm in Santa Ynez, California.

== Breeding record ==
Typecast, and all the other bloodstock at Westerly Stud Farm, was sold at an estate dispersal auction in early 1973. She served as a broodmare in Japan from 1973 through 1980 before being shipped to a breeding farm in Ireland. Her first mating was to Sir Ivor. Of the seven other foals that followed, her second mating in 1975 was the most successful, with the filly Pretty Cast earning 1980 Champion Older Mare honors in Japan.
