= Willard L. Proctor =

Personal information
- Born: December 11, 1915 Lampasas, Texas
- Died: October 30, 1998 (aged 82) Arcadia, California
- Resting place: Sunset Memorial Park, Gilmer, Texas
- Occupation: Trainer

Horse racing career
- Sport: Horse racing
- Career wins: 1,109

Major racing wins
- Fayette Stakes (1964); Demoiselle Stakes (1966); Round Table Handicap (1966); Royal Palm Handicap (1966); Santa Barbara Handicap (1972); Santa Paula Stakes (1972); Vanity Invitational Handicap (1972, 1973); Del Mar Derby (1973); Santa Maria Handicap (1974); Baldwin Stakes (1975); Chula Vista Handicap (1976, 1977); San Carlos Handicap (1977); San Pasqual Handicap (1977); Santa Ysabel Stakes (1978); Autumn Days Handicap (1979); Del Mar Debutante Stakes (1979); Del Mar Futurity (1979); Monrovia Handicap (1979); Norfolk Stakes (1979); Speakeasy Stakes (1979); Santa Ynez Stakes (1980); San Diego Handicap (1981); El Encino Stakes (1982,1984); La Brea Stakes (1983, 1994); Providencia Stakes (1985); Santa Margarita Invitational Handicap (1985); Santa Monica Stakes (1985); Balboa Stakes (1985); Malibu Stakes (1992); Los Angeles Handicap (1993); Railbird Stakes (1993); Palos Verdes Handicap (1994); Triple Bend Invitational Handicap (1995); Lady's Secret Stakes (1996)

Honours
- Texas Horse Racing Hall of Fame (2003); Willard L. Proctor Memorial Stakes at Hollywood Park

Significant horses
- Convenience, Gallant Romeo

Williard Lee Proctor (December 11, 1915 – October 30, 1998) was an American Thoroughbred racehorse trainer. A longtime trainer in California, he began his career as a jockey at bush tracks in Texas and Louisiana. After his riding days were over he turned to training, moving to California in 1955. From then through to his retirement in 1996 he conditioned 58 stakes winners.

A 2003 inductee in the Texas Horse Racing Hall of Fame, the Willard L. Proctor Memorial Stakes at Hollywood Park is named in his honor. His son Tom is a trainer.

In 1972, Convenience, trained by Willard Proctor, defeated Typecast in a $250,000 winner-take-all match race in front of 53,575 fans at Hollywood Park.
