= Afifa =

Afifa is either a surname or a given name.

== Notable people with the surname ==
- Abdulla Afifa (born 1991), Qatari footballer
- Mohamed Saeed Afifa (born 1962), Qatari footballer

== Notable people with the given name ==
- Afifa Al Shartouni (1886–1906), Lebanese author
- Afifa Iskandar (1921–2012), Iraqi singer
- Afifa Karam (1883–1924), Lebanese-American journalist, novelist, and translator
