= Graduation Stakes =

- Class: Restricted stakes
- Location: Del Mar Racetrack; Del Mar, California, United States
- Inaugurated: 1952
- Race type: Thoroughbred - Flat racing

Race information
- Distance: 5 1/2 furlongs
- Surface: Dirt
- Track: left-handed
- Qualification: Two-year-olds bred in California
- Purse: $100,000

The Graduation Stakes is an American Thoroughbred horse race run annually during the first week of August at Del Mar Racetrack in Del Mar, California. The race is restricted to two-year-old horses bred in the State of California. First run in 1952 at a distance of six furlongs on dirt, in 2000 it was modified to its current five and one half furlongs which has been run on Polytrack since 2007.

The Graduation Stakes was run in two divisions in 1964.

Hall of Fame jockey Johnny Longden won the first three runnings of this race and won it for a fourth time in 1959.
