= Corey Black =

American jockey

Personal information
- Born: January 11, 1969 (age 57) Westminster, California, U.S.
- Occupation: Jockey

Horse racing career
- Sport: Horse racing
- Career wins: 1,524

Major racing wins
- Del Mar Debutante Stakes (1986); Clement L. Hirsch Handicap (1987, 1989); Ramona Handicap (1988); Buena Vista Handicap (1989); Gamely Stakes (1989); La Brea Stakes (1989); Del Mar Oaks (1990); Jockey Club Gold Cup (1990); San Marcos Stakes (1990); Santa Ana Handicap (1990); Stars and Stripes Handicap (1990); Strub Stakes (1990); Yerba Buena Handicap (1990); Forerunner Stakes (1991); Gardenia Handicap (1991); Robert B. Lewis Stakes (1992); Bing Crosby Handicap (1993); Hollywood Gold Cup (1993); Hollywood Turf Cup Stakes (1994); Frank E. Kilroe Mile Handicap (1994); San Vicente Stakes (1994); Baldwin Stakes (1997); Santa Monica Handicap (1999) International race wins: Hong Kong International Bowl (1992); Prix de Seine-et-Oise (1992); Prix Berteux (1992); Prix Corrida (1992)

Significant horses
- Best Pal, Brave Raj, Flying Continental

Corey A. Black (born January 11, 1969) is an American retired jockey in Thoroughbred horse racing.

== Early life and career ==
Born in Westminster, California, Black won his first race as a professional apprentice jockey on October 16, 1985, during the Oak Tree Racing Association meet at Santa Anita Park. A Champion that year, he led all apprentice jockeys in United States racing in purse money won. During a fifteen-year career, Black rode primarily in California where he won important races, including the 1993 Hollywood Gold Cup aboard Best Pal.

In the summer of 1987 and again in 1992, Black rode in France where he won a number of conditions races.

Like many in his profession, Corey Black battled weight gain that eventually was a factor in his retirement at age thirty-one on November 26, 2000. Following retirement he worked as an agent for a short time, acting for jockeys Gary Stevens and Brice Blanc. In 2002, he was hired to work on the set of the motion picture, Seabiscuit. He served as a stunt double for actor Tobey Maguire, who he taught the posturing of a professional jockey, and played the role of the jockey (Harry Richards) on Rosemont, William duPont, Jr.'s horse that beat Seabiscuit in the 1937 Santa Anita Handicap. Black has worked as an exercise rider and has been an analyst on the TVG Network horse racing broadcasts.

Corey Black was a member of Board of Don MacBeth Memorial Jockey Fund, an organization that raises money to assist injured and disabled riders.
