= Tyler Baze =

American Champion jockey

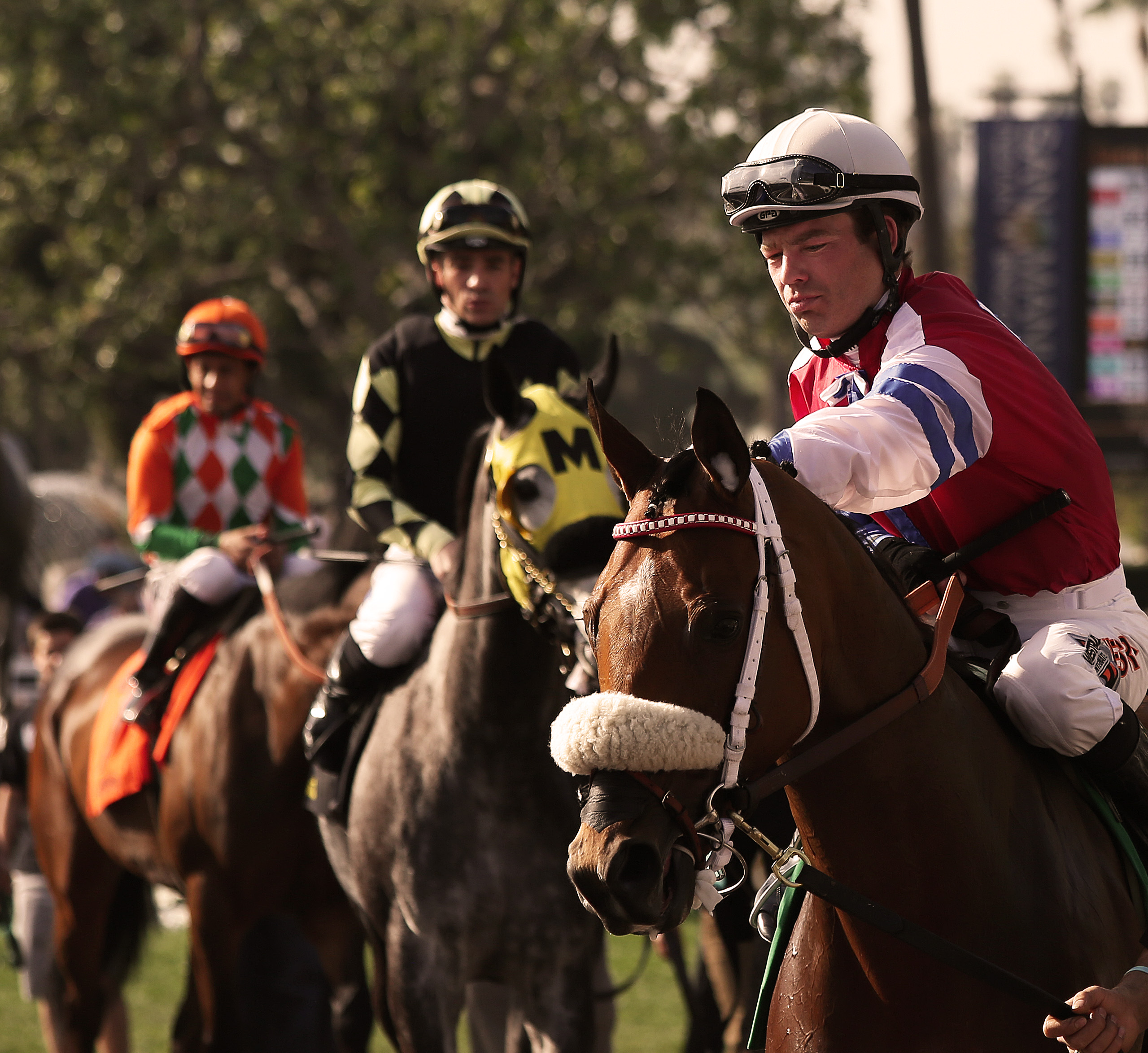
- Baze and other jockeys in 2014

Personal information
- Born: October 19, 1982 (age 43) Seattle, Washington, United States
- Occupation: Jockey

Horse racing career
- Sport: Horse racing
- Career wins: 1,800+ (ongoing)

Major racing wins
- Will Rogers Stakes (2001); San Luis Obispo Handicap (2001); Ancient Title Breeders' Cup Handicap (2003); Palos Verdes Handicap (2003); Bing Crosby Handicap (2004); Monrovia Handicap (2003, 2005); Pat O'Brien Handicap (2004); Clement L. Hirsch Turf Championship Stakes (2004); Robert B. Lewis Stakes (2004); Del Mar Handicap (2004, 2005); Moccasin Stakes (2004, 2008); Landaluce Stakes (2005); San Pasqual Handicap (2005); Sunshine Millions Turf (2005); Santa Ynez Stakes (2005); Gamely Breeders' Cup Handicap (2005); Palomar Breeders' Cup Handicap (2006); Windy Sands Handicap (2007); San Fernando Breeders' Cup Stakes (2007); California Cup Juvenile Fillies Stakes (2007); Baldwin Stakes 2008; Frank E. Kilroe Mile Handicap (2008); Swaps Stakes (2008); Sorrento Stakes (2008); Santa Ysabel Stakes (2009); Arcadia Handicap (2009); Hollywood Oaks (2009); Californian Stakes (2009); Colonial Turf Cup (2009); American Handicap (2009); Virginia Derby (2009); Rancho Bernardo Handicap(2009); Senator Ken Maddy Handicap (2009); Winstar Oaks (2010); Mervyn Leroy Handicap (2011); Clement L. Hirsch Stakes (2011); California Cup Classic (2012)

Racing awards
- U.S. Champion Apprentice Jockey (2000)

Significant horses
- Star Over The Bay
- Updated on April 1, 2007

Tyler Baze (born October 19, 1982) is an American Champion jockey from Seattle, Washington. He was born into a racing family, since both of his parents were jockeys, as is his uncle, Gary Baze. His second cousin is U.S. Racing Hall of Fame jockey Russell Baze.

Baze began riding in Southern California in 1999 and earned his first victory on October 31 of that year. In 2000, he rode 246 winners and was voted the Eclipse Award for Outstanding Apprentice Jockey.

Baze went through a rough patch beginning in 2003, but recovered with a new agent and a new nutritional regime. He rides mostly at California's Santa Anita Park and Phoenix, Arizona's Turf Paradise.

In August 2011 he was sidelined due to substance abuse but returned to racing in October 2012. His first win back occurred on October 13, 2012, in the Lava Man California Classic Cup aboard Lucky Primo.

== Year-end charts ==
Chart (2000–present)	Peak position
National Earnings List for Jockeys 2000	55
National Earnings List for Jockeys 2001	31
National Earnings List for Jockeys 2002	69
National Earnings List for Jockeys 2003	22
National Earnings List for Jockeys 2004	15
National Earnings List for Jockeys 2005	17
National Earnings List for Jockeys 2006	38
National Earnings List for Jockeys 2007	45
National Earnings List for Jockeys 2008	19
National Earnings List for Jockeys 2009	21
National Earnings List for Jockeys 2010	58
National Earnings List for Jockeys 2013	96
National Earnings List for Jockeys 2014	21
National Earnings List for Jockeys 2015	16
