= Leonard H. Lavin =

American consumer products businessman (1919–2017)

- Born: October 29, 1919; Chicago, Illinois, U.S.
- Died: August 2, 2017 (aged 97)
- Education: University of Washington
- Occupations: Businessman, philanthropist, racehorse owner/breeder
- Known for: Founder of Alberto-Culver
- Board member of: Alberto-Culver; Histogen, Inc.
- Spouse: Bernice E. Weiser
- Children: 3
- Awards: TOBA Florida Breeder of the Year (1994); Eclipse Award Of Merit (2015)

Leonard H. Lavin (October 29, 1919 – August 2, 2017) was an American businessman, racehorse owner and breeder, and philanthropist, who, in 1955 founded the Alberto-Culver Company. He served as chairman emeritus of the company and was a director of the international manufacturer/distributor of personal care and household/grocery products. Lavin was also a director of Histogen, a regenerative medicine company based in San Diego, California.

== Background ==
Lavin studied at the University of Washington, then served in the US Navy for four years. In 1947, he married Bernice Weiser (1925–2007), who went on to become an executive of Alberto-Culver and played an important part in the company's success.

== Philanthropy ==
Among their philanthropic activities is the Bernice and Leonard H. Lavin Endowed Scholarship for Inner City Chicagoland Students at Lewis University in Romeoville, Illinois, the Lavin VentureStart programs in the Entrepreneurial Management Center at San Diego State University, and the Leonard and Bernice Lavin Entrepreneurship Program at the University of Washington.

== Thoroughbred racing ==
Since the 1960s, Lavin was involved in horse racing. He owned Glen Hill Farm in Ocala, Florida, where he bred Thoroughbreds. In 1994 he was voted the Thoroughbred Owners and Breeders Association's Florida Breeder of the Year award. Among his best-known horses are Relaunch, an outstanding sire whose daughter One Dreamer won the 1994 Breeders' Cup Distaff, In 2015, he was awarded the Eclipse Award Of Merit, a lifetime achievement award.

Lavin is the author of Winners Make It Happen: Reflections of a Self-Made Man.

== Awards ==
Lavin was inducted as a laureate of The Lincoln Academy of Illinois and awarded the Order of Lincoln (the state's highest honor) by the Governor of Illinois in 1997 in the area of business and industry.

== Death ==
He died in August 2017 at the age of 97 from complications of pneumonia.
