= Turkish Trousers (horse) =

American-bred Thoroughbred racehorse

- Sire: Bagdad
- Grandsire: Double Jay
- Dam: Nas-Mahal
- Damsire: Nasrullah
- Sex: Filly
- Foaled: 1968
- Country: United States
- Colour: Dark Bay/Brown
- Breeder: Howard B. Keck
- Owner: Mrs. Howard B. Keck
- Trainer: Charles E. Whittingham
- Record: 18: 12-1-2
- Earnings: US$308,225

Major wins
- Del Mar Oaks (1971); Hollywood Oaks (1971); Honeymoon Handicap (1971); Princess Stakes (1971); Railbird Stakes (1971); Santa Susana Stakes (1971); Santa Ynez Stakes (1971); Senorita Stakes (1971); Santa Maria Handicap (1972); Santa Margarita Handicap (1972)

Awards
- American Champion Three-Year-Old Filly (1971)
- Last updated on March 23, 2010

Turkish Trousers (foaled 1968) was an American Champion Thoroughbred racehorse bred and raced by California businessman, Howard B. Keck.

== Racing career ==
Ridden by future U.S. Racing Hall of Fame inductee, Bill Shoemaker, two-year-old Turkish Trousers made her debut a winning one on December 30, 1970, at Santa Anita Park. The following year she was the dominant filly of her age group and after winning eight important stakes, was voted the 1971 Eclipse Award for American Champion Three-Year-Old Filly. Her wins included the top race for three-year-old fillies at each of the three Southern California tracks, taking the Del Mar Oaks at Del Mar Racetrack, the Hollywood Oaks at Hollywood Park Racetrack, and the Santa Susana Stakes (now the Santa Anita Oaks) at Santa Anita Park.

In her first start at age four in 1972, Turkish Trousers finished second to Typecast in the Santa Monica Handicap. She returned to form in February 1972 but as the bettors' longshot when she won the Santa Maria Handicap and paid $190.40 for a $2 winning ticket. She then won the Santa Margarita Handicap in March, again defeating Typecast as well as another top-rated filly, Convenience. After that, Turkish Trousers finished off the board in her next starts and was retired at the end of the year.

== Breeding record ==
As a broodmare, Turkish Trousers' offspring met with limited success. From her four foals that raced, her best was probably the 1976 filly Persona, sired by Tom Rolfe, who won four of thirty-two starts and earned US$102,225.
