= Melvin F. Stute =

American horse trainer (1927–2020)

Melvin Stute
Personal information
- Born: August 8, 1927 Fort Wayne, Indiana
- Died: August 12, 2020 (aged 93)
- Occupation: Trainer

Horse racing career
- Sport: Horse racing
- Career wins: 2,000

Major racing wins
- Californian Stakes (1961); San Carlos Handicap (1961, 1978); Del Mar Oaks (1969); Frank E. Kilroe Mile Handicap (1970, 1995); Del Mar Futurity (1975); Norfolk Stakes (1975, 1985); Haggin Stakes (1975); California Juvenile Stakes (1975); California Derby (1976); Carleton F. Burke Handicap (1977); Affirmed Handicap (1981); Santa Catalina Stakes (1981); San Felipe Stakes (1981); Mervyn Leroy Handicap (1984); Santa Ynez Stakes (1984, 1986, 1987); Hollywood Futurity (1985); Del Mar Debutante Stakes (1986); El Camino Real Derby (1986, 1989); Florida Derby (1986); Jersey Derby (1986); San Fernando Stakes (1986); Santa Anita Derby (1986); Fantasy Stakes (1987); Monrovia Handicap (1987, 1996); Oaklawn Handicap (1987); Railbird Stakes (1987, 2003); Strub Stakes (1987); Test Stakes (1987); Dixie Stakes (1988); La Brea Stakes (1988); Las Flores Handicap (1989); Las Virgenes Stakes (1989); Martha Washington Stakes (1989); San Vicente Stakes (1989); El Encino Stakes (1995); Morvich Handicap (1995); San Rafael Stakes (1997); Triple Bend Invitational Handicap (1997); Palos Verdes Handicap (1998); Sensational Star Handicap (1998); Landaluce Stakes (2002); Sorrento Stakes (1986, 2002); Best Pal Stakes (2003); Santa Paula Stakes (2003); Hollywood Juvenile Championship Stakes (2003); Speakeasy Stakes (2007) U.S. Triple Crown series: Preakness Stakes (1986) Breeders' Cup wins: Breeders' Cup Juvenile Fillies (1986); Breeders' Cup Sprint (1987)

Racing awards
- Laffit Pincay Jr. Award (2006)

Honours
- Fairplex Park Hall of Fame (2003); Mel Stute's Bar at Hollywood Park Racetrack

Significant horses
- Brave Raj, Double Discount, Snow Chief, Telly's Pop, Very Subtle

Melvin Frederick "Mel" Stute (August 8, 1927 – August 12, 2020) was an American trainer of Thoroughbred racehorses. On December 11, 2010, at Hollywood Park Racetrack, he won the 2000th race of a career that includes a win in the second leg of the U.S. Triple Crown series, the Preakness Stakes in 1986, the Breeders' Cup Juvenile Fillies that same year, and the 1987 Breeders' Cup Sprint.

Stute was the younger brother of trainer Warren Stute (1921–2007). His family moved to California in 1934 when Mel was seven years old. In his teens, Stute worked as a groom at Santa Anita Racetrack before winning his first race as a trainer in 1947 at Portland Meadows Racetrack in Portland, Oregon. Since then he won twelve training titles at various California tracks of which six were at Fairplex Park Racetrack, where he is the all-time leader in races won.

== Champions ==
In 1986, Stute trained two Champions. One was Snow Chief, with whom he won the Santa Anita Derby and Preakness Stakes, and was voted American Champion Three-Year-Old Male Horse. The other was Brave Raj, the American Champion Two-Year-Old Filly who won the Breeders' Cup Juvenile Fillies.

Stute bred and trained Telly's Pop. The gelding was owned by the racing partnership of Hollywood film director and producer Howard Koch and actor Telly Savalas, the latter naming the horse for his father. In 1975, Telly's Pop became the first horse to ever win the California Triple Crown for two-year-olds. Stute also trained Double Discount who on October 9, 1977, won the Carleton F. Burke Handicap in a world record time of 1:57 2/5 for 1 1/4 miles on turf. In the 1987 Breeders' Cup Sprint, Stute won with Very Subtle, a mare who defeated males to capture the top prize in the world for sprint horses on dirt.

== Awards and honors ==
In 2003, Stute became the first inductee into Fairplex Park's Hall of Fame. Along with brother Warren, he was the recipient of the 2006 Laffit Pincay Jr. Award, given annually by Hollywood Park Racetrack to someone who has served the horse racing industry with integrity, dedication, determination and distinction.

== Family ==
Stute remained active in racing but on a much-reduced scale. Over the years, his wife Annabelle has owned and raced a number of good horses and their son Gary Stute is also a trainer.

He died on August 12, 2020, at the age of 93.
