= William J. Hirsch =

American horse trainer (1909–1997)

William James Hirsch
Personal information
- Born: January 11, 1909 San Francisco, California
- Died: October 25, 1997 (aged 88) Bal Harbour, Florida
- Occupation: Trainer

Horse racing career
- Sport: Horse racing
- Career wins: 1,000+

Major racing wins
- Latonia Derby (1933); Widener Handicap (1937); Santa Anita Derby (1939, 1962); Selima Stakes (1945); Sapling Stakes (1947); Lamplighter Stakes (1948); Massachusetts Handicap (1949); Washington Birthday Handicap (1950); Washington Park Futurity Stakes (1950); Washington Park Handicap (1951); Cinderella Stakes (1952); Hawthorne Gold Cup Handicap (1952); Matron Stakes (1952); San Carlos Handicap (1952); San Juan Capistrano Handicap; (1952, 1953, 1954, 1963); Strub Stakes (1952); Hollywood Derby (1953); American Handicap (1954); Inglewood Handicap (1954); Santa Anita Handicap (1954); San Fernando Stakes (1954); Hollywood Gold Cup (1955); San Pasqual Handicap (1955); Del Mar Derby (1956); Palos Verdes Handicap (1958, 1963); Santa Barbara Handicap (1958); Coaching Club American Oaks (1959); San Gabriel Handicap (1959); Las Flores Handicap (1960); Railbird Handicap (1963); Los Angeles Handicap (1964); San Bernardino Handicap (1964); Lakes and Flowers Handicap (1952, 1965); Sunset Handicap (1966); Santa Ynez Stakes (1968); A Gleam Handicap (1969); Monmouth Oaks (1969); Premiere Handicap (1969); Spinster Stakes (1969); New York Stakes (1970); Santa Margarita Invitational Handicap (1970); Santa Maria Handicap (1970); Gallorette Handicap (1971); Vosburgh Stakes (1972)

Honours
- National Museum of Racing and Hall of Fame (1982)

Significant horses
- But Why Not, Canonero II, Gallant Bloom, Rejected, To Market, Triple Bend

William James "Buddy" Hirsch (January 11, 1909 – October 25, 1997) was an American Hall of Fame trainer of Thoroughbred racehorses. He was born in San Francisco, California, the son of Hall of Fame trainer Max Hirsch. His sister, Mary Hirsch, became the first woman to earn a trainer's license in the United States.

A trainer from 1932 to 1982, Buddy Hirsch served as a trainer for the King Ranch of Texas for more than 40 years. Although best remembered for his affiliation with King Ranch, in California he trained horses for several other prominent owners from the East Coast such as Harry Isaacs, Alfred Vanderbilt Jr., Joan and John Hay Whitney's Greentree Stable as well as Edward Lasker and his wife, the actress Jane Greer.

Hirsch graduated from Georgetown University and worked during the Great Depression era at a Wall Street brokerage owned by Thoroughbred racing fan and stable owner Bernard Baruch. During World War II, Hirsch served with the United States Army and earned a Bronze Star and a Purple Heart.

In 1977, Hirsch turned over training duties for King Ranch to his son, Bill. In 1982, Hirsch was inducted into the National Museum of Racing and Hall of Fame in 1982. He died at age 88 in 1997 at Bal Harbour, Florida, and was buried next to his parents in the Cemetery of the Holy Rood in Westbury, Long Island, New York.
