= Linita =

American-bred Thoroughbred racehorse

- Sire: Indian Hemp
- Grandsire: Nasrullah
- Dam: Our Cricket
- Damsire: Stymie
- Sex: Mare
- Foaled: 1957
- Country: United States
- Colour: Chestnut
- Breeder: Angelo & Herman Corradini & George Dorney
- Owner: Angelo & Herman Corradini & George Dorney
- Trainer: Clyde Turk
- Record: 78: 17-15-10
- Earnings: US$297,742

Major wins
- Cinderella Stakes (1959); Del Mar Oaks (1960); Las Flores Handicap (1960); Ramona Handicap (1961); Sequoia Handicap (1961, 1963); Vanity Handicap (1962); Milady Handicap (1962); Santa Maria Handicap (1963)

Linita (foaled March 25, 1957) was an American Thoroughbred racing mare in California.

== Background ==
Linita was a chestnut mare bred and raced by Angelo and Herman Corradini in partnership with George Dorney, she was trained by Clyde Turk throughout her career.

== Racing career ==
Linita won seventeen career races of which the majority were important stakes races including two editions of the Sequoia Handicap in 1961 and again in 1963.

== Breeding record ==
As a broodmare, Linita's foals met with little success in racing.

== Pedigree ==
Pedigree of Linita
Sire Indian Hemp	Nasrullah	Nearco	Pharos
Sire Indian Hemp	Nasrullah	Nearco	Nogara
Sire Indian Hemp	Nasrullah	Mumtaz Begum	Blenheim
Sire Indian Hemp	Nasrullah	Mumtaz Begum	Mumtaz Mahal
Sire Indian Hemp	Sabzy	Stardust	Hyperion
Sire Indian Hemp	Sabzy	Stardust	Sister Stella
Sire Indian Hemp	Sabzy	Sarita	Swynford
Sire Indian Hemp	Sabzy	Sarita	Molly Desmond
Dam Our Cricket	Stymie	Equestrian	Equipoise
Dam Our Cricket	Stymie	Equestrian	Frilette
Dam Our Cricket	Stymie	Stop Watch	On Watch
Dam Our Cricket	Stymie	Stop Watch	Sunset Gun
Dam Our Cricket	Terse	Brevity	Sickle
Dam Our Cricket	Terse	Brevity	Ormonda
Dam Our Cricket	Terse	Angelic	Infinite
Dam Our Cricket	Terse	Angelic	Rhea
