= Telly's Pop =

American-bred Thoroughbred racehorse

- Sire: Bold Combatant
- Grandsire: Bold Ruler
- Dam: Count Us Mary
- Damsire: Count of Honor
- Sex: Gelding
- Foaled: 1973
- Country: United States
- Colour: Dark Bay/Brown
- Breeder: Melvin F. Stute & Ken Dodd
- Owner: Howard Koch & Telly Savalas
- Trainer: Melvin F. Stute
- Record: 17: 6-1-2
- Earnings: US$353,995

Major wins
- Haggin Stakes (1975); Del Mar Futurity (1975); Norfolk Stakes (1975); California Juvenile Stakes (1975); California Derby (1976)

Awards
- California Champion Two-Year-Old Colt

Telly's Pop (foaled February 25, 1973 in California) was an American Thoroughbred racehorse who was the first horse to ever win the California Triple Crown for two-year-olds. He was purchased for $6000 by the racing partnership of Hollywood film director and producer Howard Koch and actor Telly Savalas who named the horse for his father.

== Breeding ==
Bred by Ken Dodd and trainer Mel Stute, Telly's Pop was sired by Bold Combatant, a son of the outstanding Champion stallion and U.S. Racing Hall of Fame inductee, Bold Ruler. His dam was Count Us Mary whose grandsire was the 1943 U.S. Triple Crown champion, Count Fleet.

== Racing career ==
In his outstanding two-year-old season, in addition to a win in the Haggin Stakes Telly's Pop won the 1975 Del Mar Futurity at Del Mar Racetrack followed by the Norfolk Stakes at Santa Anita Park, and then the California Juvenile Stakes at Bay Meadows Racetrack, all Grade II events that comprised the California Triple Crown for his age group.

Telly's Pop made his three-year-old debut with a win in the March 13, 1976 Grade II California Derby at Golden Gate Fields. The win made him the favorite for the March 28 Santa Anita Derby, California's most important race for three-year-olds. However, Telly's Pop finished fifth in the Santa Anita Derby and then sixth in the Hollywood Derby. Suffering from soreness in a foreleg and in his back, he did not race again that year. He returned to the track on April 16, 1977 but never regained his racing form and was retired after running sixth in a Santa Anita Park allowance race on October 14, 1977.
