= Santa Ynez Stakes =

Annual horserace in Arcadia, California, United States

- Class: Listed
- Location: Santa Anita Park; Arcadia, California, United States
- Inaugurated: 1952
- Race type: Thoroughbred – Flat racing
- Website: Santa Anita Park

Race information
- Distance: 7 furlongs
- Surface: Dirt
- Track: left-handed
- Qualification: Three-year-old fillies
- Weight: 124 lbs with allowances
- Purse: US$100,000 (since 2024)
- Bonuses: Road to the Kentucky Oaks qualification points

The Santa Ynez Stakes is a Listed American thoroughbred horse race for three-year-old fillies over a distance of seven furlongs on the dirt track held annually in early January at Santa Anita Park in Arcadia, California, USA. The event currently offers a purse of US$100,000.

== History ==
The event was named after the location and landmarks in Southern California, known as Santa Ynez in the Santa Ynez Valley and the Santa Ynez Mountains in Santa Barbara County. Santa Ynez is Spanish for the virgin martyr Saint Agnes.

The inaugural running of the event was on New Year's Day in 1952 over a distance of six furlongs and was won the C. Ralph West trained coupled entry of Last Greetings and Asiatic. Last Greetings was ridden by US Hall of Fame jockey Eddie Arcaro won by 2 1/2 lengths over A Gleam with long shot Season's Best was three lengths further back in third. While Last Greetings won one more event in her career, A Gleam had a phenomenal season setting a Hollywood Park Racetrack record winning five straight stakes races in 1952.

For the 1952–53 Winter Meeting at Santa Anita the event was held as a two-year-old fillies event on the last day of December in 1952. Hence the event was not held in the 1953 calendar year. In 1954 the distance of the event was extended to 7 furlongs. In 1956 the distance of the event was reverted to six furlongs. The last running of the event at the six furlongs distance was in 1957 and was won by the 2/5 short priced favorite Sully's Trial who completed a six race winning streak.

In 1958 the distance was increased to 6 1/2 furlongs and was run at this distance for nine years. Of the notable winners during this period include the 1959 winner Silver Spoon who would be the first filly to win the Santa Ynez–Santa Susana Stakes (now Santa Anita Oaks) double as well as the Santa Anita Derby and run fifth in the 1959 Kentucky Derby to winner Tomy Lee. Silver Spoon would be voted as Thoroughbred Racing Association's U.S. Champion Three-Year-Old Filly. The 1964 winner Face The Facts, even money favorite, won by a stakes record 10 1/2 lengths and equaled the track record for the 6 1/2 furlongs distance. The winning margin continues to be the stakes record margin to date. In 1967 the event's distance was increased to seven furlongs and was run at this distance until 2012.

In the early 1970s three winners of the event went on the win the Santa Ynez–Santa Susana Stakes double. The 1971 winner Turkish Trousers easily won the event by 3 3/4 lengths in a time of 1:23 3/5. She later would be voted U.S. Champion Three-Year-Old Filly for 1971. In 1972 Fred W. Hooper's Susan's Girl set a new stakes record of 1:21 4/5 in her easy 3 1/2 length victory. She also would go on and have a successful year winning the Kentucky Oaks as well as seven other stakes races around the US and would be crowned U.S. Champion Three-Year-Old Filly.

In 1973 when the American Graded Stakes Committee would actively begin classifying events the Santa Ynez Stakes was classified as a Grade II event. However, the event would be downgraded to Grade III in 1975. In 1981 the event was upgraded once more to Grade II for three runnings.

The event was run in two divisions in 1984. Also in 1984 the event was downgraded again to Grade III. The event nonetheless attracted high quality fillies who were starting their campaigns for the year and would go on to have outstanding seasons. The 1987 winner Very Subtle won her sixth straight race and later in the year would win the Breeders' Cup Sprint. The 1988 winner Goodbye Halo was a short 4/5 odds-on favorite and easily account for her opposition winning by five lengths. Later in the spring of that year she captured the Grade I Kentucky Oaks. With such quality fillies winning the race the event was reclassified as Grade II in 1990. Between 1990 and 1995, the Breeders' Cup sponsored the event which reflected in the name of the event.

In 1995 the event was once again was classified as Grade III and the winner was Robert & Beverly Lewis's Serena's Song, winning by two lengths as the 3/2 second favorite. Serena's Song would win eight more races, six of which were Grade I, including defeating her male counterparts in the GI Haskell Invitational Handicap. Her performance earned her U.S. Champion Three-Year-Old Filly honors for 1995.

Since 1999 the event has been classified with Grade II status.

In the 21st century the event has continued to be a major preparatory race for three-year-old fillies who go on and excel in higher classified with greater stakes. Lightly raced Golden Ballet won the event in 2001 and captured the Santa Ynez–Santa Anita Oaks double.

In 2007 Santa Anita Park administration installed a new All-weather track and for the 2008 the winner was the 2007 Breeders' Cup Juvenile Fillies and 2007 US Champion Two-Year-Old Filly Indian Blessing. Indian Blessing started as the 1/10 odds-on favorite, although she was 3 lengths ahead in the straight Indian Blessing held on for a head victory over Golden Doc setting a new stakes and track record for the distance of 1:19.89.

Since 2011 the event has been held on the dirt track.

In 2018 Midnight Bisou as a maiden having her third start won the event convincingly by 4 1/2 lengths. Although Midnight Bisou did not win any honors the following year she won seven graded events and was crowned US Champion Older Dirt Female Horse for 2019.

Since 2013 the event is part of the Road to the Kentucky Oaks.

In 2025 the event was downgraded by the Thoroughbred Owners and Breeders Association to Listed status.

== Records ==
Speed record:

- 7 furlongs: 1:19.89 – Indian Blessing (2008)
- 6 1/2 furlongs: 1:15.25 – Reneesgotzip (2012)
- 6 furlongs: 1:10.20 – Sully's Trail (1957)

Margins:

- 10 1/2 lengths – Face The Facts (1964)

Most wins by a jockey:

- 7 – Bill Shoemaker (1960, 1961, 1962, 1969, 1971, 1980, 1987)

Most wins by a trainer:

- 7 – Bob Baffert (1997, 2004, 2008, 2014, 2020, 2021, 2022)

Most wins by an owner:

- 3 – Bernard J. Ridder and/or Ridder Thoroughbred Stable (1974, 1981, 1996)

Santa Ynez Stakes – Santa Susana Stakes/Santa Anita Oaks double:

- Silver Spoon (1959), Spearfish (1966), Mira Femme (1967), Allie's Serenade (1968), Opening Bid (1970), Turkish Trousers (1971), Susan's Girl (1972), Grenzen (1978), Serena's Song (1995), Golden Ballet (2001), Midnight Bisou (2018), Bellafina (2019)

== Winners ==
Year	Winner	Jockey	Trainer	Owner	Distance	Time	Purse	Grade	Ref
2025	Look Forward	Mario Gutierrez	Micheal McCarthy	Reddam Racing	7 furlongs	1:25.42	$101,500	Listed	
2024	Kopion	Flavien Prat	Richard Mandella	Spendthrift Farm	7 furlongs	1:23.89	$98,000	III	
2023	Ice Dancing	Flavien Prat	Richard Mandella	Bass II, Perry R. and Bass, Ramona S.	7 furlongs	1:22.78	$200,000	III	
2022	Under the Stars	Flavien Prat	Bob Baffert	Derrick Smith, Mrs. John Magnier & Michael Tabor	7 furlongs	1:22.51	$200,500	II	
2021	Kalypso	Joel Rosario	Bob Baffert	David A Bernsen, Rockingham Ranch & Chad Littlefield	7 furlongs	1:23.42	$200,500	II	
2020	Bast	Drayden Van Dyke	Bob Baffert	Baoma Corporation	7 furlongs	1:23.42	$200,500	II	
2019	Bellafina	Flavien Prat	Simon Callaghan	Kaleem Shah	7 furlongs	1:22:00	$200,000	II	
2018	Midnight Bisou	Mike E. Smith	William Spawr	Allen Racing & Bloom Racing Stable	7 furlongs	1:23.40	$201,035	II	
2017	Unique Bella	Mike E. Smith	Jerry Hollendorfer	Don Alberto Stable	7 furlongs	1:22.21	$200,000	II	
2016	Forever Darling	Rafael Bejarano	Richard Baltas	Richard Baltas, Hebert Bloodstock & J K Racing Stable	6 1/2 furlongs	1:16.25	$200,500	II	
2015	Seduire	Rafael Bejarano	Jerry Hollendorfer	Regis Farms	6 1/2 furlongs	1:15.37	$201,000	II	
2014	Awesome Baby	Mike E. Smith	Bob Baffert	Kaleem Shah	6 1/2 furlongs	1:16.62	$196,000	II	
2013	Renee's Titan	Tyler Baze	Doug F. O'Neill	Zillah Reddam	6 1/2 furlongs	1:16.14	$150,500	II	
2012	Reneesgotzip	Corey Nakatani	Peter L. Miller	Lanni Family Trust	6 1/2 furlongs	1:15.25	$150,000	II	
2011	California Nectar	Pat Valenzuela	Doug F. O'Neill	Suarez Racing	7 furlongs	1:21.34	$150,000	II	
2010	Amen Hallelujah	Chantal Sutherland	Richard E. Dutrow Jr.	IEAH Stables & Whizway Farms	7 furlongs	1:21.39	$150,000	II	
2009	Alpha Kitten	Tyler Baze	John W. Sadler	Ann & Jerome Moss	7 furlongs	1:21.84	$150,000	II	
2008	Indian Blessing	Garrett K. Gomez	Bob Baffert	Patti & Hal J. Earnhardt III	7 furlongs	1:19.89	$150,000	II	
2007	Jump On In	Corey Nakatani	John W. Sadler	C R K Stable	7 furlongs	1:23.45	$150,000	II	
2006	§ Dance Daily	Jon Court	D. Wayne Lukas	Robert & Beverly Lewis	7 furlongs	1:23.34	$150,000	II	
2005	Sharp Lisa	Tyler Baze	Doug F. O'Neill	J. Paul Reddam, Suarez Racing & Mark Schlesinger	7 furlongs	1:23.10	$150,000	II	
2004	Yearly Report	Jerry D. Bailey	Bob Baffert	Golden Eagle Farm	7 furlongs	1:21.11	$150,000	II	
2003	Elloluv	Pat Valenzuela	Craig Dollase	J. Paul Reddam	7 furlongs	1:23.03	$150,000	II	
2002	Dancing (GB)	Gary L. Stevens	Jenine Sahadi	Howard J. Baker	7 furlongs	1:23.07	$150,000	II	
2001	Golden Ballet	Chris McCarron	Jenine Sahadi	Team Valor & Heiligbrodt Racing	7 furlongs	1:22.30	$150,000	II	
2000	Penny Blues	Eddie Delahoussaye	Edwin J. Gregson	Buffalo Wallet	7 furlongs	1:23.38	$106,000	II	
1999	Honest Lady	Kent J. Desormeaux	Robert J. Frankel	Juddmonte Farms	7 furlongs	1:21.67	$103,292	II	
1998	Nijinsky's Passion	Corey Black	Tim Pinfield	Imagination Stable	7 furlongs	1:23.15	$108,300	III	
1997	Queen of Money	David R. Flores	Bob Baffert	Michael E. Pegram	7 furlongs	1:22.55	$105,650	III	
1996	Raw Gold	Chris Antley	David E. Hofmans	Ridder Thoroughbred Stable	7 furlongs	1:22.66	$104,550	III	
1995	Serena's Song	Corey Nakatani	D. Wayne Lukas	Robert & Beverly Lewis	7 furlongs	1:21.45	$99,800	III	
1994	Tricky Code	Corey Nakatani	Gary F. Jones	Kallenberg Thoroughbreds	7 furlongs	1:22.16	$104,575	II	
1993	Fit to Lead	Corey Nakatani	Caesar F. Dominguez	Roger Birnbaum, Peter A. & Barbara Walski et al.	7 furlongs	1:22.55	$107,500	II	
1992	Looie Capote	Kent J. Desormeaux	Eyal Klayman	Martin L. or Lois E. Gellman	7 furlongs	1:23.42	$106,450	II	
1991	Brazen	Chris McCarron	Jerry M. Fanning	Olin B. Gentry	7 furlongs	1:23.60	$87,300	II	
1990	Fit to Scout	Chris McCarron	Jack Van Berg	Robert M. Snell	7 furlongs	1:23.80	$105,625	II	
1989	Hot Novel	Eddie Delahoussaye	Fabio Nor	Joanne H. Nor	7 furlongs	1:22.80	$80,700	III	
1988	Goodbye Halo	Jorge Velasquez	Charles E. Whittingham	Arthur B. Hancock III	7 furlongs	1:23.40	$81,650	III	
1987	Very Subtle	Bill Shoemaker	Melvin F. Stute	Carl Grinstead & Ben Rochelle	7 furlongs	1:22.60	$79,950	III	
1986	Sari's Heroine	Alex O. Solis	Melvin F. Stute	Carl Grinstead & Ben Rochelle	7 furlongs	1:23.40	$88,000	III	
1985	Wising Up	Eddie Delahoussaye	D. Wayne Lukas	Samuel E. Stevens	7 furlongs	1:23.40	$88,600	III	
1984	Gene's Lady	Laffit Pincay Jr.	D. Wayne Lukas	Mr. & Mrs. Eugene V. Klein	7 furlongs	1:23.20	$68,600	III	Division 1
1984	Boo La Boo	Laffit Pincay Jr.	Melvin F. Stute	Charles Cale, Jack Liebau & Davis	7 furlongs	1:23.80	$66,900	III	Division 2
1983	A Lucky Sign	Chris McCarron	Bruce Headley	Bruce Headley, Elwood W. Johnston & Elizabeth Johnston	7 furlongs	1:23.40	$82,800	II	
1982	Flying Partner	Ray Sibille	Charles E. Whittingham	Buckland Farm	7 furlongs	1:22.80	$83,050	II	
1981	Past Forgetting	Sandy Hawley	Gordon C. Campbell	Bernard J. Ridder	7 furlongs	1:22.40	$68,800	II	
1980	Table Hands	Bill Shoemaker	Willard L. Proctor	H. Joseph Allen & Peter M. Brant	7 furlongs	1:22.40	$65,700	III	
1979	Terlingua	Laffit Pincay Jr.	D. Wayne Lukas	Barry A. Beal & L. Robert French Jr.	7 furlongs	1:21.20	$64,900	III	
1978	Grenzen	Darrel G. McHargue	Loren Rettele	Diana Delaplaine, Marjorie Schaffer & Jacqueline Woolsey	7 furlongs	1:22.20	$45,600	III	
1977	Wavy Waves	Laffit Pincay Jr.	Julius E. Tinsley Jr.	Fred W. Hooper	7 furlongs	1:22.80	$47,550	III	
1976	Daisy Do	Sandy Hawley	Hector O. Palma	Mr. & Mrs. Robert Levey	7 furlongs	1:22.40	$33,800	III	
1975	Raise Your Skirts	William Mahorney	Barney Willis	Jacqueline Woolsey & Virginia Willis	7 furlongs	1:22.40	$36,850	III	
1974	Modus Vivendi	Donald Pierce	Gordon C. Campbell	Bernard J. Ridder	7 furlongs	1:22.40	$46,500	II	
1973	Tallahto	Jorge Tejeira	Charles E. Whittingham	Elizabeth A. Keck	7 furlongs	1:21.40	$43,800	II	
1972	Susan's Girl	Victor Tejeda	John W. Russell	Fred W. Hooper	7 furlongs	1:21.80	$47,200		
1971	Turkish Trousers	Bill Shoemaker	Charles E. Whittingham	Elizabeth A. Keck	7 furlongs	1:23.60	$33,800		
1970	Opening Bid	Donald Pierce	Lou Glauburg	Mr. & Mrs. John J. Elmore	7 furlongs	1:22.20	$31,650		
1969	Poona Downs	Bill Shoemaker	Lou Glauburg	Mr. & Mrs. John J. Elmore	7 furlongs	1:24.00	$29,550		
1968	Allie's Serenade	Laffit Pincay Jr.	William J. Hirsch	Mereworth Farm	7 furlongs	1:22.60	$28,850		
1967	Mira Femme	Walter Blum	Irv Guiney	Verne H. Winchell	7 furlongs	1:24.20	$27,550		
1966	Spearfish	Donald Pierce	William A. Peterson	Michael H. Silver	6 1/2 furlongs	1:16.20	$29,000		
1965	§ Respected	Manuel Ycaza	James W. Maloney	William H. Perry	6 1/2 furlongs	1:16.20	$32,450		
1964	Face The Facts	Manuel Ycaza	James W. Maloney	William H. Perry	6 1/2 furlongs	1:15.40	$22,900		
1963	Nalee	Kenneth Church	Pete Groos	Edith V. Cardy	6 1/2 furlongs	1:16.40	$22,850		
1962	§ Don't Linger	Bill Shoemaker	Mesh Tenney	Rex C. Ellsworth	6 1/2 furlongs	1:17.60	$17,050		
1961	Het's Pet	Bill Shoemaker	J. G. Evenson	Mr. & Mrs. John Eyraud	6 1/2 furlongs	1:16.80	$17,300		
1960	Solid Thought	Bill Shoemaker	J. Lee Mosbacher	J. Lee Mosbacher & William Leach	6 1/2 furlongs	1:18.00	$18,150		
1959	Silver Spoon	Raymond York	Robert L. Wheeler	Cornelius V. Whitney	6 1/2 furlongs	1:17.00	$17,150		
1958	Zev's Joy	George Taniguchi	Roy H. Highley	Harvey F. Dick	6 1/2 furlongs	1:17.40	$18,500		
1957	Sully's Trail	George Taniguchi	Warren Stute	Mrs. Ann Peppers	6 furlongs	1:10.20	$17,350		
1956	Neva T.	George Taniguchi	R. L. Anderson	Howard D. Chastain & John J. Elmore	6 furlongs	1:11.00	$17,300		
1955	§ In Reserve	Johnny Longden	Vance Longden	Alberta Ranches	7 furlongs	1:22.40	$22,500		
1954	Sweet As Honey	Johnny Longden	Ellwood B. Johnston	Mr. & Mrs. Ellwood B. Johnston	7 furlongs	1:23.00	$17,500		
1953	Race not held								
1952	Lap Full	Eddie Arcaro	Horace A. Jones	Calumet Farm	6 furlongs	1:11.60	$17,150	† 2YOF	December
1952	§ Last Greetings	Eddie Arcaro	C. Ralph West	Clifford Mooers	6 furlongs	1:11.20	$23,700		January

Legend:
All Weather Track Dirt
Notes:
§ Ran as an entry
† Event held as a two-year-old fillies event since the scheduling of the event was in December for the 1952–53 Winter Meeting at Santa Anita

== See also ==
- Road to the Kentucky Oaks
- List of American and Canadian Graded races
