= Golden Ballet =

American thoroughbred racehorse

- Sire: Moscow Ballet
- Grandsire: Nijinsky
- Dam: Golden Jewel Box
- Damsire: Slew o' Gold
- Sex: Mare
- Foaled: 1998
- Country: United States
- Breeder: Jerry Dutton & Vladimir Popovich
- Owner: Heiligbrodt Racing Stable & Team Valor
- Trainer: Jenine Sahadi
- Record: 10:6-2-2
- Earnings: $732,145

Major wins
- Cinderella Stakes (2000); Nursery Stakes (2000); Santa Ynez Stakes (2001); Santa Anita Oaks (2001); Las Virgenes Stakes (2001); Railbird Stakes (2001)
- Last updated on June 20, 2020

Golden Ballet (foaled January 24, 1998) is an American Thoroughbred racehorse and the winner of the 2001 Santa Anita Oaks.

== Career ==
Golden Ballet's first race was on March 23, 2000, where she came in third at Santa Anita.

She got her first win in her fourth race, when she won the Nursery Stakes at Hollywood Park Racetrack on May 20, 2000. This race began a five race win streak for Golden Ballet.

Golden Ballet's next win was at the June 18, 2000, Cinderella Stakes. She then picked up her first graded win by capturing the January 20th, 2001, Santa Ynez Stakes.

She then captured a pair of grade 1 wins, by winning the 2001 Las Virgenes Stakes and the 2001 Santa Anita Oaks. Her winstreak snapped when she ran second in the April 7, 2001, Ashland Stakes.

Golden Ballet's last race was on May 19, 2001, when she captured the Railbird Stakes. She suffered a tendon injury on June 5, 2001, and was retired.

== Pedigree ==
Pedigree of Golden Ballet (USA), 1998
| Sire Moscow Ballet (USA) 1982 | Nijinsky (CAN); 1967 | Northern Dancer | Nearctic |
| Sire Moscow Ballet (USA) 1982 | Nijinsky (CAN); 1967 | Northern Dancer | Natalma |
| Sire Moscow Ballet (USA) 1982 | Nijinsky (CAN); 1967 | Flaming Page | Bull Page |
| Sire Moscow Ballet (USA) 1982 | Nijinsky (CAN); 1967 | Flaming Page | Flaring Top |
| Sire Moscow Ballet (USA) 1982 | Millicent (USA); 1969 | Cornish Prince | Bold Ruler |
| Sire Moscow Ballet (USA) 1982 | Millicent (USA); 1969 | Cornish Prince | Teleran |
| Sire Moscow Ballet (USA) 1982 | Millicent (USA); 1969 | Milan Mill | Princequillo |
| Sire Moscow Ballet (USA) 1982 | Millicent (USA); 1969 | Milan Mill | Virginia Water |
| Dam Golden Jewel Box (USA) 1989 | Slew o' Gold (USA); 1980 | Seattle Slew | Bold Reasoning |
| Dam Golden Jewel Box (USA) 1989 | Slew o' Gold (USA); 1980 | Seattle Slew | My Charmer |
| Dam Golden Jewel Box (USA) 1989 | Slew o' Gold (USA); 1980 | Alluvial | Buckpasser |
| Dam Golden Jewel Box (USA) 1989 | Slew o' Gold (USA); 1980 | Alluvial | Bayou |
| Dam Golden Jewel Box (USA) 1989 | Miss Storm Bird (USA); 1984 | Storm Bird | Northern Dancer |
| Dam Golden Jewel Box (USA) 1989 | Miss Storm Bird (USA); 1984 | Storm Bird | South Ocean |
| Dam Golden Jewel Box (USA) 1989 | Miss Storm Bird (USA); 1984 | Sun Lover | Nasomo |
| Dam Golden Jewel Box (USA) 1989 | Miss Storm Bird (USA); 1984 | Sun Lover | Sunshine Gino |
