= Test Stakes =

- Class: Grade I
- Location: Saratoga Race Course; Saratoga Springs, New York, United States
- Inaugurated: 1922
- Race type: Thoroughbred – Flat racing
- Website: www.nyra.com/saratoga/racing/stakes-schedule/test/

Race information
- Distance: 7 furlongs
- Surface: Dirt
- Track: left-handed
- Qualification: Three-year-old fillies
- Weight: Assigned
- Purse: $500,000

The Test Stakes is an American Thoroughbred horse race open to three-year-old fillies and run each summer at the Saratoga Race Course in Saratoga Springs, New York. It is contested at a distance of seven furlongs on the dirt and is an influential race in shaping the Breeders' Cup Filly & Mare Sprint. A Grade I event, it carries a purse of $500,000.

It was first run at Saratoga in 1922. Over the years it has also become an important race for fillies pointing towards the Grade I Alabama Stakes which also runs at Saratoga Race Course.

Inaugurated at a mile and quarter, it went to seven furlongs in its second running. The Test Stakes took place at Belmont Park in 1943, 1944, and 1945. It was not run from 1923 to 1925 or in 1961. It was run in two divisions in 1960, 1962, 1963, 1965, 1966, 1967, 1970, 1973, 1974, 1975, 1977, 1978, and 1979.

== Records ==
Speed record:

- 1:20.83 – Lady Tak (2003), Gamine (2020)

Most wins by a jockey:

- 6 – Jerry Bailey (1988, 1994, 1995, 1997, 2002, 2003)

Most wins by a trainer:

- 5 – James Fitzsimmons (1928, 1942, 1951, 1956, 1963)

Most wins by an owner:

- 3 – Wheatley Stable (1928, 1963, 1965)
- 3 – Ogden Phipps (1956, 1972, 1979)

== Winners ==
| Year | Winner | Jockey | Trainer | Owner | Time |
|---|---|---|---|---|---|
| 2026 | Explora | Flavien Prat | Bob Baffert | Pegram, Michael E., Watson, Karl and Weitman, Paul | 1:22.42 |
| 2025 | Kilwin | José Ortiz | George R. Arnold II | BBN Racing | 1:23.10 |
| 2024 | Ways and Means | Flavien Prat | Chad C. Brown | Klaravich Stables | 1:22.28 |
| 2023 | Pretty Mischievous | Tyler Gaffalione | Brendan P. Walsh | Godolphin, LLC | 1:23.40 |
| 2022 | Chi Town Lady | Joel Rosario | Wesley A. Ward | Castleton Lyons | 1:23.87 |
| 2021 | Bella Sofia | Luis Saez | Rudy Rodriguez | Michael Imperio, Vincent Scuderi, Sofia Soares, Gabrielle Farm, Mazel Stable Partners & Matthew J Mercurio | 1:21.54 |
| 2020 | Gamine | John R. Velazquez | Bob Baffert | Michael Lund Petersen | 1:20.83 |
| 2019 | Covfefe | Joel Rosario | Brad H. Cox | LNJ Foxwoods | 1:21.26 |
| 2018 | Separationofpowers | José Ortiz | Chad C. Brown | Klaravich Stables | 1:22.78 |
| 2017 | American Gal | José Ortiz | Simon Callaghan | Kaleem Shah | 1:22.26 |
| 2016 | Paola Queen | Luis Saez | Gustavo Delgado | Grupo Seven C Stable | 1:22.32 |
| 2015 | Cavorting | Irad Ortiz Jr | Kiaran McLaughlin | Stonestreet Stables | 1:22.81 |
| 2014 | Sweet Reason | Irad Ortiz Jr | Leah Gyarmati | Treadway Racing Stable (Jeff Treadway) | 1:22.31 |
| 2013 | Sweet Lulu | Julien Leparoux | Jerry Hollendorfer | Steven Beneto | 1:23.45 |
| 2012 | Contested | Rafael Bejarano | Bob Baffert | Natalie J. Baffert | 1:22.47 |
| 2011 | Turbulent Descent | David Flores | Mike Puype | Blinkers On Racing & Partners | 1:24.17 |
| 2010 | Champagne d'Oro | Miguel Mena | Eric Guillot | Southern Equine Stables/Smith | 1:22.71 |
| 2009 | Flashing | Richard Migliore | Saeed bin Suroor | Godolphin Stable | 1:22.40 |
| 2008 | Indian Blessing | John Velazquez | Bob Baffert | Patti & Hal Earnhardt | 1:22.70 |
| 2007 | Dream Rush | Eibar Coa | Richard Violette Jr. | West Point Stable | 1:22.42 |
| 2006 | Swap Fliparoo | Eibar Coa | H. Allen Jerkens | Hobeau Farm | 1:24.13 |
| 2005 | Leave Me Alone | Kent Desormeaux | J. Eric Kruljac | Mitchell Ranch LLC | 1:22.76 |
| 2004 | Society Selection | Edgar Prado | H. Allen Jerkens | Irving & Marjorie Cowan | 1:23.69 |
| 2003 | Lady Tak | Jerry Bailey | Steve Asmussen | Heiligbrodt Racing | 1:20.83 |
| 2002 | You | Jerry Bailey | Robert J. Frankel | Edmund A. Gann | 1:22.84 |
| 2001 | Victory Ride | Edgar Prado | George R. Arnold II | G. Watts Humphrey Jr. | 1:21.72 |
| 2000 | Dream Supreme | Pat Day | William I. Mott | Kinsman Stable | 1:22.66 |
| 1999 | Marley Vale | John Velazquez | Todd Pletcher | Eugene Melnyk | 1:22.77 |
| 1998 | Jersey Girl | Mike E. Smith | Todd Pletcher | Ackerley Bros. Farm | 1:23.02 |
| 1997 | Fabulously Fast | Jerry Bailey | John C. Kimmel | Caesar Kimmel & Philip Solondz | 1:21.65 |
| 1996 | Capote Belle | John Velazquez | Daniel C. Peitz | Robert & Lawana Low | 1:21.08 |
| 1995 | Chaposa Springs | Jerry Bailey | Martin Wolfson | Suresh Chintamaneni | 1:21.81 |
| 1994 | Twist Afleet | Jerry Bailey | John C. Kimmel | Lucille Conover | 1:22.08 |
| 1993 | Missed the Storm | Mike E. Smith | William I. Mott | Pin Oak Farm | 1:22.00 |
| 1992 | November Snow | Chris Antley | H. Allen Jerkens | Earle I. Mack | 1:21.20 |
| 1991 | Versailles Treaty | Ángel Cordero Jr. | C. R. McGaughey III | Cynthia Phipps | 1:22.80 |
| 1990 | Go For Wand | Randy Romero | William Badgett Jr. | Christiana Stable | 1:21.12 |
| 1989 | Safely Kept | Craig Perret | Alan E. Goldberg | Barry L. Weisbord | 1:21.33 |
| 1988 | Fara's Team | Jerry Bailey | Richard Dutrow Sr. | Happy Valley Farm | 1:22.85 |
| 1987 | Very Subtle | Pat Valenzuela | Melvin F. Stute | Pearl Grinstead | 1:21.00 |
| 1986 | Storm and Sunshine | Craig Perret | Thomas J. Kelly | Woodcrest Farms | 1:22.80 |
| 1985 | Lady's Secret | Jorge Velásquez | D. Wayne Lukas | Eugene V. Klein | 1:22.60 |
| 1984 | Sintra | Keith Allen | Steven Penrod | Cherry Valley Farm | 1:22.60 |
| 1983 | Lass Trump | Pat Day | C. R. McGaughey III | Alan Samford | 1:22.20 |
| 1982 | Gold Beauty | Don Brumfield | William D. Curtis | Georgia E. Hoffman | 1:22.80 |
| 1981 | Cherokee Frolic | Gary Cohen | William A. Cole | Carolsteve Stables | 1:23.20 |
| 1980 | Love Sign | Ángel Cordero Jr. | Sidney Watters Jr. | Stephen C. Clark Jr. | 1:22.20 |
| 1979 | Blitey | Ángel Cordero Jr. | Angel Penna Sr. | Ogden Phipps | 1:22.60 |
| 1979 | Clef d' Argent | Ruben Hernandez | David A. Whiteley | Lazy F Ranch | 1:22.20 |
| 1978 | Tingle Stone | Ruben Hernandez | David A. Whiteley | Christiana Stable | 1:22.00 |
| 1978 | White Star Line | Jeffrey Fell | Woody Stephens | Newstead Farm | 1:21.40 |
| 1977 | Northern Sea | Jorge Velásquez | John M. Veitch | Windfields Farm | 1:22.40 |
| 1977 | Small Raja | Mickey Solomone | Thomas J. Kelly | David P. Reynolds | 1:21.80 |
| 1976 | Ivory Wand | Pat Day | J. Elliott Burch | Rokeby Stable | 1:23.00 |
| 1975 | Hot N Nasty | Jorge Tejeira | Gordon R. Potter | Dan Lasater | 1:22.00 |
| 1975 | My Juliet | Jacinto Vásquez | Leland G. Ripley | George Weasel Jr. | 1:22.00 |
| 1974 | Quaza Quilt | Jacinto Vásquez | Charles R. Parke | Fred W. Hooper | 1:22.40 |
| 1974 | Maybellene | Don Meade Jr. | James Lewis | Penny Acres Farm | 1:23.60 |
| 1973 | Desert Vixen | Jorge Velásquez | Tommy Root Sr. | Harry T. Mangurian Jr. | 1:23.00 |
| 1973 | Waltz Fan | Jorge Velásquez | Victor J. Nickerson | Mereworth Farm | 1:23.60 |
| 1972 | Numbered Account | Jacinto Vásquez | Roger Laurin | Ogden Phipps | 1:23.80 |
| 1971 | Lucky Traveler | Chuck Baltazar | John W. Jacobs | Nelson B. Hunt | 1:23.80 |
| 1970 | Hunnemannia | Eddie Belmonte | Angel Penna Sr. | Gedney Farm | 1:23.60 |
| 1970 | Princess Roycraft | Larry Adams | Warren Pascuma | Franlyn Stable | 1:22.40 |
| 1969 | Ta Wee | Eddie Belmonte | John A. Nerud | Tartan Stable | 1:23.60 |
| 1968 | Heartland | John L. Rotz | Max Hirsch | King Ranch | 1:22.40 |
| 1967 | Gamely | Eddie Belmonte | James W. Maloney | William Haggin Perry | 1:21.80 |
| 1967 | Treacherous | Michael Sorrentino | Sherrill Ward | Lazy F Ranch | 1:23.00 |
| 1966 | Belle de Nuit | John Ruane | Bert Mulholland | Jesse S. Widener | 1:23.60 |
| 1966 | Moccasin | Braulio Baeza | Harry Trotsek | Claiborne Farm | 1:23.40 |
| 1965 | Cestrum | Sam Boulmetis | Carl Hanford | Bohemia Stable | 1:23.00 |
| 1965 | Discipline | Walter Blum | William C. Winfrey | Wheatley Stable | 1:23.60 |
| 1964 | Time For Bed | John L. Rotz | John M. Gaver Sr. | Greentree Stable | 1:23.80 |
| 1963 | Barbwolf | Bobby Ussery | Burley Parke | Harbor View Farm | 1:25.00 |
| 1963 | Bold Consort | Hedley Woodhouse | James Fitzsimmons | Wheatley Stable | 1:25.80 |
| 1962 | Firm Policy | Johnny Sellers | E. Barry Ryan | E. Barry Ryan | 1:23.40 |
| 1962 | Polylady | Braulio Baeza | James P. Conway | Darby Dan Farm | 1:23.40 |
| 1960 | Be Cautious | Bobby Ussery | John A. Nerud | Joseph M. Roebling | 1:24.00 |
| 1960 | Brave Pilot | Hedley Woodhouse | John Rigione | Kenneth W. Thornhill | 1:23.80 |
| 1959 | Shirley Jones | Paul J. Bailey | James W. Smith | Brae Burn Farm | 1:26.00 |
| 1958 | Any Morn | John Ruane | Jake Byer | North Hill Farm | 1:25.80 |
| 1957 | Miss Blue Jay | Ted Atkinson | Sol Rutchick | Adele Rutchick | 1:24.40 |
| 1956 | Glamour | Sidney Cole | James Fitzsimmons | Ogden Phipps | 1:25.80 |
| 1955 | Blue Banner | Eddie Arcaro | Jack Skinner | Rokeby Stable | 1:24.60 |
| 1954 | Dispute | Eric Guerin | Sylvester Veitch | C. V. Whitney | 1:25.20 |
| 1953 | Canadiana | Dave Gorman | Gordon J. McCann | E. P. Taylor | 1:25.60 |
| 1952 | Gay Grecque | Raymond York | Gene Jacobs | Mrs. S. George Zauderer | 1:26.80 |
| 1951 | Vulcania | Robert Bernhardt | James Fitzsimmons | Belair Stud | 1:26.00 |
| 1950 | Honey's Gal | George Hettinger | Winbert F. Mulholland | Fitz Eugene Dixon Jr. | 1:24.40 |
| 1949 | Lady Dorimar | Conn McCreary | Woody Stephens | Woodvale Farm | 1:25.20 |
| 1948 | Alablue | Eric Guerin | John H. Skirvin | John H. Skirvin | 1:25.80 |
| 1947 | Miss Disco | Nick Combest | Anthony Pascuma | Sydney S. Schupper | 1:24.40 |
| 1946 | Red Shoes | Eddie Arcaro | Thomas D. Rodrock | Howell E. Jackson III | 1:23.40 |
| 1945 | Safeguard | Ted Atkinson | Preston M. Burch | Brookmeade Stable | 1:24.20 |
| 1944 | Whirlabout | Herb Lindberg | Graceton Philpot | Louis B. Mayer | 1:24.80 |
| 1943 | Stefanita | Conn McCreary | Bert Mulholland | George D. Widener Jr. | 1:25.20 |
| 1942 | Vagrancy | James Stout | James Fitzsimmons | Belair Stud | 1:26.00 |
| 1941 | Imperatrice | Jack Skelly | George M. Odom | William H. LaBoyteaux | 1:25.20 |
| 1940 | Piquet | Eddie Arcaro | John M. Gaver Sr. | Greentree Stable | 1:24.40 |
| 1939 | Redlin | Don Meade | John P. Jones | William H. Lipscomb | 1:24.00 |
| 1938 | Black Wave | John Gilbert | Preston M. Burch | Nydrie Stable | 1:25.80 |
| 1937 | Evening Tide | Charles Kurtsinger | Albert B. Gordon | E. Dale Shaffer | 1:26.00 |
| 1936 | Fair Stein | Eddie Yager | Jake Byer | Herman Phillips | 1:24.80 |
| 1935 | Good Gamble | Sam Renick | Bud Stotler | Alfred G. Vanderbilt II | 1:24.80 |
| 1934 | Bazaar | Don Meade | Herbert Thompson | Edward R. Bradley | 1:24.60 |
| 1933 | Speed Boat | John Gilbert | George Conway | Glen Riddle Farm | 1:24.20 |
| 1932 | Suntica | Mack Garner | Jack Whyte | Willis Sharpe Kilmer | 1:26.00 |
| 1931 | Buckup | Mack Garner | J. Howard Lewis | Joseph E. Widener | 1:25.80 |
| 1930 | Conclave | D. Lyons | William H. Karrick | William R. Coe | 1:24.20 |
| 1929 | Dinah Did Upset | Norman LeBlanc | C. B. Read | Sylvester W. Labrot | 1:24.20 |
| 1928 | Nixie | Danny McAuliffe | James Fitzsimmons | Wheatley Stable | 1:25.80 |
| 1927 | Black Curl | Laverne Fator | Sam Hildreth | Rancocas Stable | 1:26.60 |
| 1926 | Ruthenia | Earl Sande | Pete Coyne | Joseph E. Widener | 1:25.60 |
| 1922 | Emotion | Linus McAtee | George M. Odom | Robert L. Gerry Sr. | 2:11.20 |
