= Squirtle Squirt =

American-bred Thoroughbred racehorse

- Sire: Marquetry
- Grandsire: Conquistador Cielo
- Dam: Lost The Code
- Damsire: Lost Code
- Sex: Stallion
- Foaled: 1998
- Country: United States
- Colour: Dark Bay/Brown
- Breeder: Dr. Audrey Narducci
- Owner: David J. Lanzman Racing Stable Inc.
- Trainer: Jose Garcia, Jr. Robert J. Frankel (2001)
- Record: 16: 8-4-0
- Earnings: US$1,112,220

Major wins
- Willard L. Proctor Memorial Stakes (2000); Haggin Stakes (2000); Hollywood Juvenile Championship Stakes (2000); Barretts Juvenile Stakes (2000); King's Bishop Stakes (2001) Breeders' Cup wins: Breeders' Cup Sprint (2001)

Awards
- American Champion Sprint Horse (2001)

Squirtle Squirt (foaled 1998 in Kentucky) is an American Champion Thoroughbred racehorse.

== Background ==
Squirtle Squirt was out of the mare Lost The Code, by multiple Grade I winner Lost Code. His sire was 1991 Hollywood Gold Cup winner Marquetry, who also sired the 1999 Breeders' Cup Sprint winner, Artax. Marquetry was a son of 1982 American Horse of the Year and Belmont Stakes winner Conquistador Cielo.

Consigned to the 1998 Keeneland November sale, Squirtle Squirt was sold to Donna Wormser for $30,000. She put him up for auction again at the March 2000 Barretts Auction of 2-year-olds-in-training, where David Lanzman paid $25,000 for the colt with a bad knee. Lanzman turned him over to trainer Jose Garcia, Jr. for race conditioning.

== Racing career ==
In his two-year-old season, Squirtle Squirt won five of his eight starts, including the Grade III Hollywood Juvenile Championship Stakes in July. In November, he underwent surgery for a persistent knee problem, after which his new owner sent him to trainer Bobby Frankel.

In 2001, Squirtle Squirt raced exclusively in sprint races, winning three of his six starts and finishing a close second in the others. Sent east to the Saratoga Race Course in Saratoga Springs, New York, on August 25 the colt won the Grade I King's Bishop Stakes. He then finished second in the Vosburgh Stakes at Belmont Park, where he remained for that year's Breeders' Cup. Entered in the six furlongs Breeders' Cup Sprint, Squirtle Squirt defeated a strong field that included horses such as Xtra Heat (2nd), Caller One (3rd), and the 7:2 betting favorite, Kona Gold. For Frankel, it marked his first win in a Breeders' Cup race after thirty-eight starters.

For his 2001 performances, Squirtle Squirt was voted the Eclipse Award as the American Champion Sprint Horse.

At age four, Squirtle Squirt won two of four starts, with his best graded stakes result a second-place finish in the G2 Palos Verdes Handicap.

== Retirement and stud ==
Retired to stud, Squirtle Squirt stands at Iburi Stallion Station on the island of Hokkaidō in Japan. Later, Squirtle Squirt was moved to Kyushu. The most successful horse sired by Squirtle Squirt is Yoka Yoka, a Graded Stakes winner at Kitakyushu Kinen.
