= Sardula =

American Thoroughbred racehorse

- Sire: Storm Cat
- Grandsire: Storm Bird
- Dam: Honor an Offer
- Damsire: Hoist The Flag
- Sex: Mare
- Foaled: 1991
- Country: United States
- Color: Bay
- Breeder: M&M Stables & Overbrook Farm
- Owner: Jerry & Ann Moss
- Trainer: Brian Mayberry
- Record: 10: 6-3-0
- Earnings: US$882,460

Major wins
- Hollywood Starlet Stakes (1993); Del Mar Debutante Stakes (1993); Princess Stakes (1994); Santa Paula Stakes (1994); Kentucky Oaks (1994)

Sardula (May 4, 1991 – February 1, 1995) was an American Thoroughbred racemare who, as a two-year-old in 1993 finished second by a nose in the Breeders' Cup Juvenile Fillies then won the Grade 1 Hollywood Starlet Stakes. At age three, Sardula's wins included the prestigious Grade 1 Kentucky Oaks.

== Breeding ==
Sardula was bred by William T. Young at his Overbrook Farm near Lexington, Kentucky in conjunction with M&M Stables, a Lexington-based venture formed by Bob McCann of McCann Bloodstock agency and Pope McLean Sr. of Crestwood Farm. She was purchased for $40,000 by recording industry executive Jerry Moss and his wife Ann who turned over the somewhat high-strung filly's race conditioning to Brian Mayberry, a trainer widely respected for his ability and patience with temperamental young horses.

Sardula was sired by Storm Cat, twice the Leading sire in North America, three times the Leading broodmare sire in North America plus the Leading Juvenile Sire in North America a record seven times. Among other notable progeny, Storm Cat sired Aljabr, Black Minnaloushe, Cat Thief, Forestry, Giant's Causeway, Jalil, Life Is Sweet, Storm Flag Flying and Tabasco Cat. Sardula's Canadian-bred grandsire Storm Bird raced in England where he was the Top-rated European two-year-old of the 1980 official International Classification, and that year's Timeform top two-year-old given an above average rating of 134. Storm Bird sired 63 stakes winners, including 1990 Preakness Stakes winner Summer Squall and was the broodmare sire of runners with more than one hundred stakes wins to their credit, including the 1995 Kentucky Derby and Belmont Stakes winner Thunder Gulch.

Sardula's dam was the unraced Honor an Offer, who was also the dam of the racemare Imperial Gesture, whose career earnings totaled more than U.S. $1.4 million. Sardula's damsire, Hoist the Flag, was the 1970 American Champion Two-Year-Old Colt and at stud was the 1987 Leading broodmare sire in North America. Hoist the Flag was the son of Tom Rolfe who won the 1965 Preakness Stakes and was voted that year's American Champion Three-Year-Old Male Horse. Tom Rolfe was sired by the undefeated two-time Prix de l'Arc de Triomphe winner Ribot. Ribot was widely regarded as one of the greatest Thoroughbred racehorses worldwide, and became the Leading sire in Great Britain and Ireland in 1963, 1967, and 1968.

== Racing career ==
Making her career debut on August 7, 1993, at Del Mar Racetrack under jockey Eddie Delahoussaye, the two-year-old Sardula ran away from the field to win by ten lengths. On September 4 at the same racetrack she won the Debutante Stakes defeating runner-up Phone Chatter who came back on November 6 to beat Sardula by a nose in the ensuing Breeders' Cup Juvenile Fillies. In her final race as a two-year-old, on December 18 Sardula won the Grade 1 Hollywood Starlet Stakes at Hollywood Park.

Racing at age three, Sardula's first start on April 9, 1994, was a winning one by 8 ½ lengths in the Santa Paula Stakes at Santa Anita Park. On May 6 Sardula got the most important win of her career in the Kentucky Oaks at Churchill Downs in which she defeated Lakeway by a short head after they had raced head-to-head down the homestretch. On June 18, 1994, she had another victory, this time by 5 ½ lengths in the Princess Stakes at Hollywood Park. Lakeway avenged her May 6 loss to Sardula on July 10, beating her by 4 ½ lengths in the mile and one-eighth Hollywood Oaks in a time of 1:46 4/5 that was just a fifth of a second off the track record. Sardula finished fifth in her next start that marked the only occasion she would ever finish off the board. It happened when she ran for the first time on turf in the August 21 Del Mar Invitational Oaks.

== Life-ending illness ==
Sardula suffered from what appeared to be a leg injury that kept her out of racing but plans were to retire her to breeding. In October 1994, veterinarians diagnosed her problem as Osteomyelitis, a degenerative bacterial infection which had attacked her right foreleg. Treatment did nothing to help the condition and on February 1, 1995, Sardula was euthanized at the Alamo Pintado Equine Research Center near Los Olivos, California.

== Pedigree ==
Pedigree of Sardula, bay mare, 1991
Sire Storm Cat	Storm Bird	Northern Dancer	Nearctic
Sire Storm Cat	Storm Bird	Northern Dancer	Natalma
Sire Storm Cat	Storm Bird	South Ocean	New Providence
Sire Storm Cat	Storm Bird	South Ocean	Shining Sun
Sire Storm Cat	Terlingua	Secretariat	Bold Ruler
Sire Storm Cat	Terlingua	Secretariat	Somethingroyal
Sire Storm Cat	Terlingua	Crimson Saint	Crimson Satan
Sire Storm Cat	Terlingua	Crimson Saint	Bolero Rose
Dam Honor an Offer	Hoist the Flag	Tom Rolfe	Ribot
Dam Honor an Offer	Hoist the Flag	Tom Rolfe	Pocahontas
Dam Honor an Offer	Hoist the Flag	Wavy Navy	War Admiral
Dam Honor an Offer	Hoist the Flag	Wavy Navy	Triomphe
Dam Honor an Offer	Bridget O' Brick	Mr. Brick	Johns Joy
Dam Honor an Offer	Bridget O' Brick	Mr. Brick	Feronia
Dam Honor an Offer	Bridget O' Brick	Drop Shot	Correlation
Dam Honor an Offer	Bridget O' Brick	Drop Shot	My Alison (family: 1-c)
