= Senorita Stakes =

- Class: Grade III
- Location: Santa Anita Park; Arcadia, California, USA relocated from the now closed Hollywood Park Racetrack; Inglewood, California, United States
- Inaugurated: 1968
- Race type: Thoroughbred - Flat racing
- Website: Santa Anita Park

Race information
- Distance: abt. 6 1/2 furlongs
- Surface: Turf
- Track: Left-handed
- Qualification: Three-year-old fillies

The Senorita Stakes is an American flat Thoroughbred horse race for three-year-old fillies held annually at Santa Anita Park in Arcadia, California.

The race began in 1968 at the now-closed Hollywood Park in Inglewood, California. It was moved to Santa Anita Park upon Hollywood Park's closure at the end of the 2013 season.

As of 2017, it is a Grade III race run over a distance of about 6 1/2 furlongs on turf offering a purse of $100,000.

== Winners of the Senorita Stakes since 1991 ==
Year	Winner	Jockey	Trainer	Owner	Time
At Santa Anita Park
2026	Marjoram	Juan J. Hernandez	Michael W. McCarthy	Juddmonte	1:13.78
2025	Jungle Peace (IRE)	Umberto Rispoli	Philip D'Amato	CYBT, McLean Racing Stables, Jerry McClanahan, Michael Nentwig and Jeremy Peskoff	1:13.83
2024	Visually	Edwin A. Maldonado	Librado Barocio	California Racing Partners, Ciaglia Racing LLC, Fick Brothers Racing Inc., Dario Bernardi and George P. Monty	1:12.91
2023	Teena Ella	Edwin A. Maldonado	Richard E. Mandella	Spendthrift Farm LLC	1:12.36
2022	Island Of Love (IRE)	Juan Hernandez	Philip D'Amato	R Unicorn Stable	1:35.35
2021	Madone	Juan Hernandez	Simon Callaghan	Kaleem Shah	1:35.17
	no race 2020				
2019	Maxim Rate	Kent Desormeaux	Simon Callaghan	Slam Dunk Racing	1:36.31
2018	Treasuring (GB)	Brice Blanc	Simon Callaghan	Qatar Racing	1:35.43
2017	Sircat Sally	Stewart Elliott	Jerry Hollendorfer	Joe L. Turner	1:35.83
2016	Stays in Vegas	Alex Solis	Jerry Hollendorfer	Jungle Racing, KMN Racing, LNJ Foxwoods	1:37.98
2015	Prize Exhibit (GB)	Santiago Gonzalez	James Cassidy	D P Racing	1:36.03
2014	Sheza Smoke Show	Joseph Talamo	Peter Eurton	G. Biegler, J. Border, et al.	1:35.34
At Hollywood Park
2013	Charlie Em (GB)	Garrett Gomez	Patrick Gallagher	Eclipse Thoroughbred Partners	1:35.18
2012	Bobina	Victor Espinoza	A. C. Avila	Haras Santa Maria de Araras	1:35.18
2011	Star Billing	Chantal Sutherland	John Shirreffs	George Krikorian	1:34.52
2010	Cozi Rosie	Mike Smith	John W. Sadler	Jerome & Ann Moss	1:35.11
2009	Mrs Kipling (IRE)	David Flores	Neil Drysdale	Bobby Flay	1:34.52
2008	Sweeter Still (IRE)	Martin Garcia	Jeff Mullins	David J. Lanzman Racing Stable and Jason Wood	1:35.63
2007	Valbenny (IRE)	Alex Solis	Patrick Gallagher	Rita DiPietro, LGL Racing, Michael Rosenmayer, et al.	1:34.47
2006	Foxysox (GB)	Alex Bisono	Carla Gaines	Warren B. Williamson	1:35.28
2005	Virden	Omar Figueroa	Dan McFarlane	Dennis E. Weir	1:35.37
2004	Miss Vegas (IRE)	Alex Solis	Robert Frankel	Edmund A. Gann	1:34.25
2003	Makeup Artist	Victor Espinoza	John Shireffs	George Krikorian	1:36.54
2002	Adoration	Garrett Gomez	David Hofmans	Amerman Racing	1:34.91
2001	Fantastic Filly (FR)	Garrett Gomez	Robert Frankel	Agri-Harvest, Inc.	1:35.13
2000	Islay Mist (GB)	David Flores	Kathy Walsh	James Vreeland	1:34.16
1999	Coracle	Kent Desormeaux	Robert Frankel	Dr. John A. Chandler	1:34.04
1998	Dancing Rhythm	Kent Desormeaux	Michael Machowsky	Lesbines and Rocarek	1:35.39
1997	Kentucky Kaper	Rene Douglas	Michael Smith	Goodman, Nielsen, Ozer, et al.	1:34.74
1996	To B. Super	Chris Antley	Roger Stein	Big Fly Stable and Gurnick	1:34.36
1995	Top Shape (FR)	Corey Nakatani	Robert Frankel	Edmund A. Gann	1:34.79
1994	Rabiadella	Laffit Pincay, Jr.	J. Michael Orman	Stonehenge Stables	1:34.84
1993	Likeable Style	Kent Desormeaux	Richard Mandella	Golden Eagle Farm	1:34.56
1992	Charm a Gendarme	Rafael Meza	Noble Hay III	Mr. and Mrs. Robert H. Walter	1:33.66
1991	Paula Revere	Jose Santos	John W. Sadler	Irvlu Stable	1:35.50

== Earlier winners ==
- 1990 - Brought to Mind
- 1989 - Reluctant Guest
- 1988 - Do So
- 1987 - Pen Bal Lady
- 1986 - Nature's Way
- 1985 - Akamini
- 1985 - Shywing
- 1984 - Heartlight
- 1983 - Stage Door Canteen
- 1983 - Preceptress
- 1982 - Skillful Joy
- 1981 - Shimmy
- 1980 - Ballare
- 1979 - Variety Queen
- 1978 - Blue Blood
- 1977 - Glenaris
- 1976 - Now Pending
- 1975 - Raise Your Skirts
- 1974 - no race
- 1973 - Cellist
- 1972 - Impressive Style
- 1971 - Shelf Talker
- 1971 - Turkish Trousers
- 1970 - Night Staker
- 1969 - Prove it Girl
- 1969 - Commissary
- 1968 - Time to Leave
