= Brian Mayberry =

American racehorse trainer

Personal information
- Born: March 8, 1938 Hollywood, Florida
- Died: July 20, 1998 (aged 60) Huntington Beach, California
- Occupation: Trainer

Horse racing career
- Sport: Horse racing
- Career wins: 975

Major racing wins
- Landaluce Stakes (1988, 1990, 1991, 1992, 1993); Sierra Madre Handicap (1988); A Gleam Handicap (1990, 1992); Alfred G. Vanderbilt Handicap (1990); Bel Air Handicap (1990); Las Flores Handicap (1990, 1992); Moccasin Stakes (1990, 1992, 1994); Railbird Stakes (1990); Santa Monica Handicap (1990); Triple Bend Invitational Handicap (1990); Beaumont Stakes (1991, 1992); Generous Stakes (1991); Sorority Stakes (1991); Spinaway Stakes (1991); Hollywood Juvenile Championship Stakes (1992, 1993); Brown & Williamson Handicap (1992); Oak Leaf Stakes (1992); Santa Paula Stakes (1992, 1994); Sorrento Stakes (1992, 1994); Thoroughbred Club of America Stakes (1992); Hollywood Starlet Stakes (1993); Harold C. Ramser Sr. Handicap (1993); Del Mar Debutante Stakes (1993); San Simeon Handicap (1993); Countess Fager Handicap (1994); Kentucky Oaks (1994); Princess Stakes (1994); Ashland Stakes (1995); Westchester Stakes (1998)

Significant horses
- Ifyoucouldseemenow, Propectors Gamble, Miss Iron Smoke, Ramblin' Guy, Sardula, Set Them Free, Stormy But Valid, Urbane, Zoonaqua

Brian A. Mayberry (March 8, 1938 – July 20, 1998) was an American Thoroughbred racehorse trainer noted as a top race conditioner of two-year-olds.

Mayberry was the son of a trainer and the grandson of John P. Mayberry who saddled Judge Himes to win the 1903 Kentucky Derby. Brian Mayberry never started a horse in the Derby but on the day before the big race in 1994, he won the prestigious Kentucky Oaks at Churchill Downs with Sardula.

Jockey Martin Pedroza's first three winners were trained by the late Brian Mayberry, for whom he named one of his sons.

Brian Mayberry died in 1998 after a lengthy battle with cancer.
