= Flashing (horse) =

American-bred Thoroughbred racehorse

- Sire: A.P. Indy
- Grandsire: Seattle Slew
- Dam: Morning Pride
- Damsire: Machiavellian
- Sex: Mare
- Foaled: 2006; Kentucky
- Country: United States
- Colour: Chestnut
- Breeder: Gainsborough Farm
- Owner: Godolphin Stables
- Trainer: Saeed bin Suroor
- Jockey: Richard Migliore
- Record: 10: 6-0-2
- Earnings: US$658,556

Major wins
- Test Stakes (2009); Gazelle Stakes (2009)

Flashing was foaled on March 5, 2006, in Kentucky and is a graded stakes winner for Godolphin. She is trained by Saeed bin Suroor and her jockey is Richard Migliore. She is owned by Godolphin Stables and was bred by Gainsborough Farm LLC. She has won the Test Stakes and the Gazelle Stakes.
