= Separationofpowers =

American thoroughbred racehorse

- Sire: Candy Ride
- Grandsire: Ride The Rails
- Dam: Shehadmefromhello
- Damsire: Empire Maker
- Sex: Mare
- Foaled: February 9, 2015
- Country: USA
- Breeder: Northwest Farms LLC
- Owner: Klaravich Stables, Inc.
- Trainer: Chad C. Brown
- Jockey: Jose L. Ortiz
- Record: 10:4-0-2
- Earnings: $964,000

Major wins
- Test Stakes (2018); Frizette Stakes (2017)

Separationofpowers (foaled February 9, 2015) is an American Thoroughbred racehorse and the winner of the 2018 Test Stakes.

== Career ==
Separationofpowers's first race was on July 30, 2017, at Saratoga, where she came in first.

In her second race, she competed in the September 2nd, 2017 Grade-1 Spinaway Stakes, but finished in 3rd. She had better luck the next month as on October 8, 2017, she won the Frizette Stakes. This was her final win of the year after a fourth-place finish at the 2017 Breeders' Cup Juvenile Fillies.

She had an ankle injury that caused her to miss most of the 2018 season. The break paid off though as she won the August 4th, 2018 Grade-1 Test Stakes upon her return. This was her only win of the 2018 season, after a disappointing fourth-place finish at the Grade-1 2018 Cotillion Handicap.

Her 2019 season was limited to only three races, with her only victory being at the Grade-3 Bed O' Roses Invitational Stakes.

Her final race was a fourth-place finish at the 2019 Ballerina Stakes.

Separationfopowers was put up for sale in November 2019.

== Pedigree ==
Pedigree of Separationofpowers (USA), 2015
Sire Candy Ride (ARG) 1999	Ride the Rails (USA); 1991	Cryptoclearance	Fappiano
Sire Candy Ride (ARG) 1999	Ride the Rails (USA); 1991	Cryptoclearance	Naval Orange
Sire Candy Ride (ARG) 1999	Ride the Rails (USA); 1991	Herbalesian	Herbager
Sire Candy Ride (ARG) 1999	Ride the Rails (USA); 1991	Herbalesian	Alanesian
Sire Candy Ride (ARG) 1999	Candy Girl (ARG); 1990	Candy Stripes	Blushing Groom
Sire Candy Ride (ARG) 1999	Candy Girl (ARG); 1990	Candy Stripes	Bubble Company
Sire Candy Ride (ARG) 1999	Candy Girl (ARG); 1990	City Girl	Farnesio
Sire Candy Ride (ARG) 1999	Candy Girl (ARG); 1990	City Girl	Cithara
Dam Shehadmefromhello (USA) 2006	Empire Maker (USA); 2000	Unbridled	Fappiano
Dam Shehadmefromhello (USA) 2006	Empire Maker (USA); 2000	Unbridled	Gana Facil
Dam Shehadmefromhello (USA) 2006	Empire Maker (USA); 2000	Toussaud	El Gran Senor
Dam Shehadmefromhello (USA) 2006	Empire Maker (USA); 2000	Toussaud	Image of Reality
Dam Shehadmefromhello (USA) 2006	Lasting Code (USA); 1999	Lost Code	Codex
Dam Shehadmefromhello (USA) 2006	Lasting Code (USA); 1999	Lost Code	Loss Or Gain
Dam Shehadmefromhello (USA) 2006	Lasting Code (USA); 1999	Cajun Nite Lady	Ogygian
Dam Shehadmefromhello (USA) 2006	Lasting Code (USA); 1999	Cajun Nite Lady	Lady Hardwick
