= Very Subtle =

American-bred Thoroughbred racehorse

- Sire: Hoist the Silver
- Grandsire: Hoist the Flag
- Dam: Never Scheme
- Damsire: Never Bend
- Sex: Mare
- Foaled: 1984
- Country: United States
- Colour: Chestnut
- Breeder: John Howard King
- Owner: 1) Carl Grinstead & Ben Rochelle; 2) Ben Rochelle
- Trainer: Melvin F. Stute
- Record: 29: 12-6-4
- Earnings: US$1,608,360

Major wins
- Hollywood Starlet Stakes (1986); Fantasy Stakes (1987); Test Stakes (1987); Santa Ynez Stakes (1987); Railbird Stakes (1987); La Brea Stakes (1988); Las Flores Handicap (1989); Breeders' Cup wins: Breeders' Cup Sprint (1987)

Very Subtle (foaled 1984 in Kentucky) was an American Thoroughbred racehorse who won three Grade I stakes including the 1987 Breeders' Cup Sprint against male opponents in which she defeated the heavily favored Groovy by four lengths.

Very Subtle was trained by Mel Stute and initially raced by the California-based partnership of Carl Grinstead and Ben Rochelle who had owned a number of other top runners including the 1986 American Champion Three-Year-Old Male Horse and Preakness Stakes winner Snow Chief who was also trained by Stute. Following the March 1987 passing of Carl Grinstead, the partnership horses were auctioned at an October sale at which Ben Rochelle bought Very Subtle for $1.2 million.

Subsequent to her Breeders' Cup win, Very Subtle raced for two more years before retiring to broodmare duty after her 1989 campaign.

== Breeding record ==
Bred to Snow Chief as well as other notable sires such as Alydar and Caerleon, Very Subtle's most successful earner among her foals was the mare Dianehill, a winner of $426,551 sired by the outstanding Champion sire Danehill.

== Pedigree ==
Pedigree of Very Subtle
Sire Hoist The Silver	Hoist The Flag	Tom Rolfe	Ribot
Sire Hoist The Silver	Hoist The Flag	Tom Rolfe	Pocahontas
Sire Hoist The Silver	Hoist The Flag	Wavy Navy	War Admiral
Sire Hoist The Silver	Hoist The Flag	Wavy Navy	Triomphe
Sire Hoist The Silver	Silver Service	Prince John	Princequillo
Sire Hoist The Silver	Silver Service	Prince John	Not Afraid
Sire Hoist The Silver	Silver Service	En Casserole	War Relic
Sire Hoist The Silver	Silver Service	En Casserole	Beanie M
Dam Never Scheme	Never Bend	Nasrullah	Nearco
Dam Never Scheme	Never Bend	Nasrullah	Mumtaz Begum
Dam Never Scheme	Never Bend	Lalun	Djeddah
Dam Never Scheme	Never Bend	Lalun	Be Faithful
Dam Never Scheme	Sweetly Scheming	Creme Dela Creme	Olympia
Dam Never Scheme	Sweetly Scheming	Creme Dela Creme	Judy Rullah
Dam Never Scheme	Sweetly Scheming	Double Agent	Double Jay
Dam Never Scheme	Sweetly Scheming	Double Agent	Conniver
