= Princess Pat Stakes =

- Class: Discontinued stakes
- Location: Chicago, Illinois: Washington Park (1937-1957); Arlington Park (1958-1963)
- Inaugurated: 1937
- Race type: Thoroughbred - Flat racing

Race information
- Distance: 6 furlongs
- Surface: Dirt
- Track: left-handed
- Qualification: Two-year-old fillies

The Princess Pat Stakes was an American Thoroughbred horse race first run in 1937 at Chicago's Washington Park Race Track. A race for two-year-old fillies, except for 1941 and 1942 when it was open to fillies and mares age three and older, the Princess Pat Stakes was moved to Arlington Park in 1958.

For most of its duration, the Princess Pat Stakes offered the largest purse of an American race for two-year-old fillies. In 1954, it was the world's richest race for 2-year-old fillies with a purse of $102,760.

The Princess Pat Stakes was run in two divisions in 1961.

== Records ==
Speed record:

- 1:09.20 - Smart Deb (for 6 furlongs)

Most wins by a jockey:

- 3 - Douglas Dodson (1945, 1947, 1949)

Most wins by an owner:

- 3 - Calumet Farm (1944, 1947, 1951)

== Winners ==
Year	Winner	Jockey	Trainer	Owner	Dist. (Furlongs)	Time	Win $
1963	Sari's Song	Bill Shoemaker	Jess Byrd	J. Kel Houssels	6 F	1:11.20	$16,925
1962	Smart Deb	Manuel Ycaza	Arnold N. Winick	Mrs. Russell L. Reineman	6 F	1:09.20	
1961	Dodge Me	Eldon Coffman		Mrs. R. M. Chastain	5.5 F	1:04.00	$16,262
1961	Miss Summer Time	Robert Nono	Del W. Carroll	Russell A. Firestone Jr.	5.5 F	1:04.20	$16,262
1960	Rose Bower	John L. Rotz	Loyd Gentry, Jr.	Charlton Clay	6 F	1:09.80	$62,500
1959	Heavenly Body	Manuel Ycaza	Woody Stephens	Cain Hoy Stable	6 F	1:09.80	$65,450
1958	Battle Heart	Kenneth Church	Douglas Davis, Jr.	Edward P. Metz	6 F	1:10.80	$71,000
1957	Hasty Doll	Bill Hartack	Harry Trotsek	Hasty House Farm	6 F	1:11.20	$67,120
1956	Splendored	John Heckmann	Donald M. McKellar	Donald M. McKellar	6 F	1:13.40	$58,300
1955	Supple	Bill Hartack		Hal Price Headley	6 F	1:10.40	$57,710
1954	Delta	Steve Brooks	Moody Jolley	Claiborne Farm	6 F	1:14.80	$63,590
1953	Queen Hopeful	John Adams	Harry Trotsek	Hasty House Farm	6 F	1:11.00	$68,320
1952	Fulvous	Dave Erb	Jack C. Hodgins	Miss Mary V. Fisher	6 F	1:09.80	$55,825
1951	A Gleam	Steve Brooks	Horace A. Jones	Calumet Farm	6 F	1:10.40	$47,620
1950	Flyamanita	Gerald Porch	J. W. Burton	Reverie Knoll Farm	6 F	1:10.80	$43,710
1949	Here's Hoping	Douglas Dodson	Jack C. Hodgins	Dixiana Stable	6 F	1:10.40	$43,175
1948	Sequence	Fred A. Smith	John M. Goode	Brownell Combs II	6 F	1:10.00	$41,900
1947	Bewitch	Douglas Dodson	Ben A. Jones	Calumet Farm	6 F	1:11.00	$48,875
1946	Say Blue	Sammy Roberts	H. C. "Red" Dodson	Mrs. Albert Sabath	6 F	1:13.00	$50,275
1945	Beaugay	Douglas Dodson	Tom Smith	Maine Chance Farm	6 F	1:13.00	34,020
1944	Good Blood	Leon Haas	Ben A. Jones	Calumet Farm	6 F	1:13.20	$29,340
1943	Whirlabout	Joe Wagner		Arthur B. Hancock, Jr.	5.5 F	1:08.80	
1942	Blue Delight	Ralph Neves	Burley Parke	Mrs. John Marsch	8 F	1:37.00	$4,190
1941	Misty Isle	Albert Snider	Daniel E. Stewart	Joseph E. Widener	8 F	1:36.80	$2,000
1938	1940	Race not held					
1937	Well Rewarded	Leon Haas	Robert V. McGarvey	Ethel V. Mars	6 F	1:11.80	$11,370
