= Leon Haas =

American jockey

Personal information
- Nickname: Buddy
- Born: December 27, 1915 Fort Gibson, Oklahoma, United States
- Died: April 19, 1982 (aged 66) Arlington, Texas, US

Horse racing career
- Sport: Horse racing

Major racing wins
- Harlem Stakes (1934); New Orleans Handicap (1934); Santa Maria Handicap (1936, 1941); Kentucky Oaks (1938); Interborough Handicap (1938); Kentucky Jockey Club Stakes (1938); Acorn Stakes (1939); Breeders' Futurity Stakes (1939, 1942, 1944); Jerome Stakes (1939); Manhattan Handicap (1939); Stuyvesant Handicap (1939); Swift Stakes (1939); California Breeders' Champion Stakes (1940); National Stallion Stakes (1940); Remsen Stakes (1940); Westchester Handicap (1940); Wood Memorial Stakes (1940); Aberdeen Stakes (1941); American Handicap (1941); Chesapeake Stakes (1941); Del Mar Hotel Handicap (1941); Santa Anita Derby (1941); San Antonio Handicap (1941); San Juan Capistrano Handicap (1941); San Pasqual Handicap (1941); Santa Barbara Handicap (1941); Sierra Handicap (1941); Diana Handicap (1943); Arlington Classic (1944); Princess Pat Stakes (1944)

Significant horses
- Devil Diver, Kayak II, Lawrin, Mioland, Pensive, Shut Out, Twilight Tear, Whirlaway

Leon "Buddy" Haas (December 27, 1915 – April 19, 1982) was a jockey in Thoroughbred horse racing who in 1941 was reported to be earning the highest salary of any jockey in the United States.

== Racing career ==
Widely known as "Buddy", Leon Hass began riding in 1931 mainly at smaller tracks until his career got a boost on August 28, 1933, when he rode six winners on a single racecard at Thistledown Racecourse in Cleveland, Ohio, five of which were consecutive. In the years following that acclaimed success he would be hired to ride for prominent owners such as Hal Price Headley, Charles Howard, Calumet Farm and members of the Phipps family at the big tracks in New York, Kentucky, Illinois and California. In 1941, Haas won five major stakes races at California's Santa Anita Park, including the Santa Anita Derby. Four of these were for owner Charles Howard for whom Hass had ridden Kayak II to second place in the 1940 Santa Anita Handicap behind Howard's star runner, Seabiscuit.

== Triple Crown participation ==
During his career Buddy Haas rode in the Kentucky Derby four times with his best result a third in 1940. His best finish from three starts in the Preakness Stakes was a second place in 1942 aboard Requested.

Battling weight gain, on May 31, 1945, Buddy Haas announced his next and last race would be the Kentucky Derby. Run on June 9 that year, in his fourth Derby Hass rode Air Sailor to a fourth-place finish behind winner Hoop Jr.
