= Hollywood Juvenile Championship Stakes =

Hollywood Juvenile Championship
- Class: Grade III
- Location: Hollywood Park Racetrack; Inglewood, California, United States
- Inaugurated: 1938
- Race type: Thoroughbred - Flat racing
- Website: www.hollywoodpark.com

Race information
- Distance: Six furlong sprint
- Surface: Cushion Track synthetic dirt
- Track: left-handed
- Qualification: two-year-olds

The Hollywood Juvenile Championship Stakes is an American Thoroughbred horse race run annually in early July at Hollywood Park Racetrack in Inglewood, California. Open to two-year-old horses, the Grade III event is contested on synthetic over a distance of six furlongs. Prior to 2007, the race was contested on dirt.

Its first winner was the filly, Unerring, American Champion Three-Year-Old Filly in 1939. Noted past winners include Tomy Lee (1958), Affirmed (1977), Desert Wine (1982), Althea, (1983), and Squirtle Squirt (2000).

The 2005 winner, What A Song, holds the World Record [all breeds] for 2F in 20.60 seconds.

== Winners since 1991 ==
Year	Winner	Jockey	Trainer	Time	Grade
2012	Scherer Magic	Joseph Talamo	John W. Sadler	1:11.67	III
2011	Majestic City	David Flores	Peter Miller	1:10.45	III
2010	J P's Gusto	Joseph Talamo	David Hofmans	1:10.48	III
2009	Necessary Evil	Joel Rosario	Doug O'Neill	1:09.98	III
2008	Azul Leon	Rafael Bejarano	Doug O'Neill	1:10.88	III
2007	Salute the Sarge	Michael Baze	Eric Guillot	1:12.08	III
2006	E Z Warrior	David Flores	Bob Baffert	1:09.96	III
2005	What a Song	Victor Espinoza	Bob Baffert	1:09.55	III
2004	Chandtrue	Victor Espinoza	Robert Hess Jr.	1:10.88	III
2003	Perfect Moon	Patrick Valenzuela	Melvin Stute	1:10.39	III
2002	Crowned Dancer	Alex Solis	Christopher Paasch	1:10.10	III
2001	Came Home	Chris McCarron	Juan Gonzalez	1:09.20	III
2000	Squirtle Squirt	Laffit Pincay Jr.	Joe Garcia Jr.	1:09.98	III
1999	Dixie Union	Alex Solis	Richard Mandella	1:09.95	III
1998	Yes It's True	Jerry Bailey	D. Wayne Lukas	1:09.58	III
1997	K. O. Punch	Gary Stevens	D. Wayne Lukas	1:09.95	III
1996	Swiss Yodeler	Alex Solis	Mike Harrington	1:09.77	II
1995	Hennessy	Gary Stevens	D. Wayne Lukas	1:09.85	II
1994	Mr Purple	Chris McCarron	Ronald McAnally	1:10.16	II
1993	Ramblin' Guy	Eddie Delahoussaye	Brian Mayberry	1:10.09	II
1992	Altazarr	Eddie Delahoussaye	Brian Mayberry	1:10.01	II
1991	Scherando	Francisco Mena	Richard Mulhall	1:09.70	II

== Previous winners ==
- 1990 - Deposit Ticket
- 1989 - Magical Mile
- 1988 - King Glorius (Grade I winner.)
- 1987 - Mi Preferido
- 1986 - Captain Valid
- 1985 - Hilco Scamper
- 1984 - Saratoga Six (Multiple stakes winner.)
- 1983 - Althea (1983 American Champion Two-Year-Old Filly.)
- 1982 - Desert Wine
- 1981 - The Captain
- 1980 - Loma Malad (Motivity, a Filly, placed.)
- 1979 - Parsec
- 1978 - Terlingua (daughter of Secretariat and dam of Storm Cat.) (Flying Paster placed.)
- 1977 - Affirmed
- 1976 - Fleet Dragoon
- 1975 - Restless Restless
