= Santa Paula Stakes =

- Class: Ungraded stakes
- Location: Santa Anita Park; Arcadia, California, USA, United States
- Inaugurated: 1968
- Race type: Thoroughbred – Flat racing
- Website: www.santaanita.com

Race information
- Distance: 6 1/2 furlongs
- Surface: Dirt
- Track: left-handed
- Qualification: Three-year-old fillies
- Weight: Assigned
- Purse: US$75,000

The Santa Paula Stakes is an American Thoroughbred horse race run annually at the end of March at Santa Anita Park in Arcadia, California. An event open to three-year-old fillies, it is contested over a distance of six and one half furlongs. The race was downgraded from Grade III status for 2011 by the American Graded Stakes Committee.

The Santa Paula Stakes was run at 7 furlongs for fillies and mares, age three and older, from 1968 through 1974.

There was no race held from 1975 through 1991, nor in 1993.

== Records ==
Speed record: (at current distance of 6 1/2 furlongs)

- 1:14.61 - Magnificience (2007)

Most wins by a jockey:

- 4 – Alex Solis (1995, 1997, 2007, 2010)

Most wins by a trainer:

- 2 – Brian A. Mayberry (1992, 1994)
- 2 – David Hofmans (1996, 2001)
- 3 – Bob Baffert (2004, 2005, 2015)

Most wins by an owner:

- No owner has won this race more than once.

== Winners ==
Year	Winner	Age	Jockey	Trainer	Owner	Time
2015	Enchanting Lady	3	Martin Garcia	Bob Baffert	Kaleem Shah	1:15.01
2014	Uzziel	3	Tyler Baze	Mike Puype	James & Tammy McKenney	1:17.19
2011	Mildly Offensive	3	Rafael Bejarano	Carla Gaines	Warren B. Williamson	1:15.70
2010	Tanda	3	Alex Solis	Dan Hendricks	Dream Stable	1:14.36
2009	Carlsbad	3	Tyler Baze	Jeff Mullins	Dennis Weir	1:14.65
2008	Lethal Heat	3	Gerry Olguin	Barry Abrams	Barry Abrams et al.	1:14.91
2007	Magnificience	3	Alex Solis	Bruce Headley	John G. Sikura et al.	1:14.61
2006	Bettarun Fast	3	Aaron Gryder	Vladimir Cerin	Patricia & Stephen Fitzpatrick	1:15.08
2005	No Bull Baby	3	Victor Espinoza	Bob Baffert	Patti & Hal Earnhardt III	1:15.79
2004	Friendly Michelle	3	Tyler Baze	Bob Baffert	Ed Friendly	1:17.34
2003	Buffythecenterfold	3	Victor Espinoza	Melvin F. Stute	Allen Brian & Frank Stronach	1:16.56
2002	Bella Bellucci	3	Mike E. Smith	Neil D. Drysdale	Michael Tabor	1:16.36
2001	Starrer	3	Chris McCarron	David Hofmans	George Krikorian	1:16.40
2000	Abby Girl	3	Corey Nakatani	Craig Dollase	Stephan G. Herold	1:15.47
1999	Perfect Six	3	David Flores	William Morey Jr.	Chaiken & Heller, et al.	1:15.41
1998	Loveontheroad	3	Kent Desormeaux	Sanford Shulman	Charles & Clear Valley Stables	1:16.07
1997	Lavender	3	Alex Solis	Ben D. A. Cecil	Est. Robert E. Hibbert	1:16.34
1996	Raw Gold	3	Chris Antley	David Hofmans	Ridder Stable	1:15.63
1995	Made To Perfection	3	Alex Solis	Donald Warren	John S. Stonebraker et al.	1:16.24
1994	Sardula	3	Ed Delahoussaye	Brian A. Mayberry	Ann & Jerry Moss	1:15.02
1993	Race not held					
1992	Peaceful Road	3	Martin Pedroza	Brian A. Mayberry	Siegel Family	1:16.33
1976	– 1991	Race not held				
1974	Viva La Vivi	4	Donald Pierce	Harold Hodosh	Brotman & Malibu Stable	1:24.00
1973	Tizna	4	Fernando Toro	Henry M. Moreno	Regal Enterprises, Inc.	1:21.60
1972	Convenience	4	Eddie Belmonte	Willard L. Proctor	Glen Hill Farm	1:21.60
1971	Duke's Little Gal	4	Robby Kilborn	James I. Nazworthy	Mrs. Orrin Tucker	1:23.20
1970	Everything Lovely	5	Álvaro Pineda	Sidney Martin	Colin Campbell	1:22.20
1969	Guest Room	4	Walter Blum	Roger Laurin	Taylor's Purchase Farm	1:25.40
1968	Sharp Curve	4	Wayne Harris	Lester Holt	Fred Astaire	1:24.80
