= Las Flores Stakes =

- Class: Grade III
- Location: Santa Anita Park; Arcadia, California, United States
- Inaugurated: 1951
- Race type: Thoroughbred – Flat racing
- Website: www.santaanita.com

Race information
- Distance: 6 furlongs
- Surface: Dirt
- Track: left-handed
- Qualification: Fillies & Mares, Four Years Old & Up
- Weight: Assigned
- Purse: US$100,000 (2014)

The Las Flores Stakes is an American Thoroughbred horse race held annually during the first week of April at Santa Anita Park in Arcadia, California. In 2015, due to the 2013 closing of Hollywood Park Racetrack and extensive rescheduling, the race was run in early March. Open to fillies and mares age four and older, the Grade III event is contested on Pro-Ride synthetic dirt over a distance of six and one half furlongs.

Until 2008 the race was run at a distance of six furlongs.

Inaugurated in 1951 as the Las Flores Handicap the event was run for three-year-olds and up from 1951 through 1959, for four-year-olds and up from January 1960, 1972, 1975, 1981 through 1987, and again in 1989, and for all ages December 1972, 1973 and 1979. It was run in January and December 1960, 1972, 1977 and 1987, in December 1960 through 1970, and December 1977, 1978 and 1987.

The Las Flores Handicap was run in two divisions in 1963. There was no race in 1953, 1969, 1971, 1974, 1980 or 1988.

In 2022 the race was run twice. Once in March and again in December.

== Records ==
Speed record:

- 1:14.12 – Tiz Elemental (2008) (at previous distance of 6.5 furlongs)
- 1:08.02 – Ema Bovary (2004) (at present distance of 6 furlongs)

Most wins:

- 2 – Chop House (1963, 1964)

Most wins by a jockey:

- 5 – Bill Shoemaker (1954, 1958, 1962, 1964, 1966)
- 5 – Laffit Pincay Jr. (1970, 1983, 1985, 1989, 1999)

Most wins by a trainer:

- 6 – Bob Baffert (2006, 2011, 2016, 2017, 2021, 2025)

Most wins by an owner:

- 2 – Fred W. Hooper (1961, 1991)
- 2 – M/M Bert W. Martin (1963, 1964)
- 2 – Bernard J. Ridder (1972, 1977)
- 2 – Siegel family (1990, 1992)

== Winners ==
Year	Winner	Age	Jockey	Trainer	Owner	Time
2026	Margarita Girl	4	Ricardo Gonzalez	Mark Glatt	Rancho Temescal Thoroughbred Partners and Saints or Sinners	1:09.19
2025	Richi (CHI)	5	Kazushi Kimura	Bob Baffert	Hill 'n' Dale Equine Holdings, Inc. (J. G. Sikura) and Stud Vendaval, Inc.	1:09.05
2024	Chismosa	4	Kyle Frey	Rafael DeLeon	Jaime Roberto Renella	1:10.22
2022 ††	Lady T	3	Victor Espinoza	John Shirreffs	Jerome S. Moss and Tina Moss	1:09:65
2022	Edgeway	5	Juan J. Hernandez	John W. Sadler	Hronis Racing LLC	1:10:22
2021	Gamine	4	John R. Velazquez	Bob Baffert	Michael Lund Peterson	1:09:52
2019	Danuska's My Girl	5	Geovanni Franco	Jerry Hollendorfer	Bad Boy Racing LLC	1:10.23
2018	Selcourt	4	Tyler Baze	John W. Sadler	Keith Abrahams, Medallion Racing, and Sandra Lazaruk	1:09.60
2017	Pretty N Cool	4	Martin Garcia	Bob Baffert	Michael Pegram	1:10.45
2016	Fantastic Style	4	Rafael Bejarano	Bob Baffert	Kaleem Shah	1:08.79
2015	Harlington's Rose	4	Joseph Talamo	Steve Knapp	Halasz/Johnson/Newhart et al.	1:09.64
2014	Judy the Beauty	5	John Velazquez	Wesley A. Ward	Wesley A. Ward	1:08.22
2013	Rumor	5	Mike E. Smith	Richard Mandella	Bass/Claiborne Farm/Dilschneider	1:15.44
2012	Izzy Rules	5	Edwin Maldonado	Jeffrey L. Bonde	George & Mary Clare Schmitt	1:14.59
2011	Gilded Gem	5	Joel Rosario	Bob Baffert	Gaines-Gentry Thoroughbreds & Serengeti Stable	1:15.22
2010	Mona de Momma	4	Joel Rosario	John W. Sadler	Michael Talla	1:14.50
2009	Sweet August Moon	4	Aaron Gryder	Brian Koriner	Legacy Ranch/Shirley MacPherson	1:15.21
2008	Tiz Elemental	4	Victor Espinoza	Carla Gaines	Warren B. Williamson	1:14.12
2007	Hello Lucky	5	Michael Baze	Eric Guillot	Southern Equine Stable	1:09.34
2006	Behaving Badly	5	Victor Espinoza	Bob Baffert	Hal & Patti Earnhardt	1:09.09
2005	Miss Terrible	6	Alex Solis	Bradley Ross	Carol & Charles Hammersmith	1:09.47
2004	Ema Bovary	5	Roberto Gonzalez	Larry Ross	R. T. Beal & L. Ramsey	1:08.02
2003	Spring Meadow	4	Corey Nakatani	Robert B. Hess Jr.	Fog City Stable	1:10.20
2002	Above Perfection	4	Corey Nakatani	Darrell Vienna	David & Rita Milch	1:08.65
2001	Go Go	4	Ed Delahoussaye	Warren Stute	Thomas & Thomas Racing	1:08.83
2000	Show Me The Stage	4	Kent Desormeaux	Eric Guillot	Cain, Guillot & LeBlanc	1:08.54
1999	Enjoy the Moment	4	Laffit Pincay Jr.	Bill Spawr	Farfellow Farms Ltd.	1:08.55
1998	Funallover	4	Alex Solis	Gene K. White	Ford, Garrettson, et al.	1:09.10
1997	Our Summer Bid	5	Jose Silva	Sam Scolamieri	Scolamieri & Woolery	1:09.15
1996	Igotrhythm	4	Corey Nakatani	Robert J. Frankel	Edmund A. Gann (L)	1:08.88
1995	Desert Stormer	5	Kent Desormeaux	Fabio Nor	Joanne H. Nor	1:08.49
1994	Mamselle Bebette	4	Corey Nakatani	Jack Van Berg	Big Train Farm	1:08.32
1993	Bountiful Native	5	Pat Valenzuela	Dan L. Hendricks	Pam & Martin Wygod	1:09.42
1992	Forest Fealty	5	Martin Pedroza	Brian A. Mayberry	Siegel family	1:08.87
1991	Classic Value	5	Gary Stevens	William Cesare	Fred W. Hooper	1:10.20
1990	Stormy But Valid	4	Ed Delahoussaye	Brian A. Mayberry	Siegel family	1:08.20
1989	Very Subtle	5	Laffit Pincay Jr.	Melvin F. Stute	Ben Rochelle	1:08.60
1987	Flying Julia	4	Frank Olivares	Donn Luby	James Marino	1:10.20
1987	Pine Tree Lane	5	Ángel Cordero Jr.	D. Wayne Lukas	L. Don Mathis	1:09.80
1986	Baroness Direct	5	Ed Delahoussaye	John Gosden	Shirley H. Taylor	1:08.40
1985	Foggy Nation	5	Laffit Pincay Jr.	Jack Van Berg	Dayoni, Erickson, et al.	1:09.60
1984	Bara Lass	5	Pat Valenzuela	D. Wayne Lukas	Sam E. Stevens	1:09.40
1983	Matching	5	Laffit Pincay Jr.	Steve Morguelan	Glencrest Farm/Morguelan	1:09.00
1982	Back At Two	5	Chris McCarron	Gordon C. Campbell	Mrs. Douglas Carver	1:12.40
1981	Shine High	5	Terry Lipham	Darrell Vienna	Star View Farm	1:08.60
1979	Terlingua	3	Darrel McHargue	D. Wayne Lukas	B. Beal & L. French Jr.	1:08.40
1978	Sweet Little Lady	3	Darrel McHargue	John W. Fulton	George Steinbrenner	1:09.00
1977	Winter Solstice	5	Darrel McHargue	Gordon C. Campbell	Bernard J. Ridder	1:11.80
1977	My Juliet	5	Anthony Black	Eugene Euster	George Weasel Jr.	1:10.20
1976	Just a Kick	4	Enrique Munoz	Roger Clapp	Connie M. Ring	1:09.20
1975	Lucky Spell	4	Jorge Tejeira	Henry M. Moreno	Burris & Wilder	1:09.60
1973	Sandy Blue	3	Donald Pierce	Tommy Doyle	Circle C Ranch & Witt	1:08.60
1972	Chou Croute	4	John L. Rotz	Bob G. Dunham	Folsom Farm/Jones Jr.	1:09.20
1972	Crowning Glory	4	Jerry Lambert	Gordon C. Campbell	Bernard J. Ridder	1:09.00
1970	Everything Lovely	5	Laffit Pincay Jr.	Sid Martin	Colin Campbell	1:09.20
1968	Time To Leave	3	Danny Velasquez	John G. Canty	Neil S. McCarthy	1:10.20
1967	Sharp Curve	3	Wayne Harris	Lester Holt	Fred Astaire	1:09.60
1966	Natashka	4	Bill Shoemaker	William Peterson	George F. Getty II	1:09.40
1965	Poona Queen	5	Ismael Valenzuela	Gordon C. Campbell	M/M John J. Elmore	1:10.00
1964	Chop House †	4	Ismael Valenzuela	Ted Saladin	M/M Bert W. Martin	1:10.00
1964	Affectionately †	4	Bill Shoemaker	Hirsch Jacobs	Ethel D. Jacobs	1:10.00
1963	Chop House	3	Braulio Baeza	Ted Saladin	M/M Bert W. Martin	1:09.60
1963	Shimmering Star	3	Rudy Campas	George Brent	George Brent	1:09.80
1962	Oil Royalty	4	Bill Shoemaker	Charles Whittingham	John R. Gaines	1:10.00
1961	Bright Holly	3	Braulio Baeza	Julius E. Tinsley Jr.	Fred W. Hooper	1:09.80
1960	Linita	3	Manuel Ycaza	Clyde Turk	Corradini & Dorney	1:10.20
1960	Margaretta	5	Ismael Valenzuela	William J. Hirsch	King Ranch	1:09.60
1959	Bug Brush	4	Angel Valenzuela	Robert L. Wheeler	C. V. Whitney	1:09.40
1958	Ballet Khal	4	Bill Shoemaker	Mesh Tenney	Rex C. Ellsworth	1:10.00
1957	Miss Todd	4	Eddie Arcaro	Robert L. Wheeler	J. R. Jelks	1:09.80
1956	On The Move	5	Don Lewis	Carl A. Roles	Poltex Stable	1:10.20
1955	Miz Clementine	4	Ralph Neves	Horace A. Jones	Calumet Farm	1:10.00
1954	Vicki Blue	4	Bill Shoemaker	C. Ralph West	Archie Sneed	1:09.40
1952	Spanish Cream	4	Eric Guerin	Allen Drumheller	H. W. Collins	1:10.60
1951	Next Move	4	Eric Guerin	William C. Winfrey	Alfred G. Vanderbilt II	1:09.80

* † In 1964 there was a Dead heat for first.
* †† There were two races in 2022, with the second one occurring on New Year's Eve. Hence, no race in 2023.
