= Great Lady M. Stakes =

Great Lady M Stakes
- Class: Grade II
- Location: Los Alamitos Race Course; Cypress, California
- Inaugurated: 1941 (as Sequoia Handicap at Hollywood Park)
- Race type: Thoroughbred – Flat racing
- Website: www.losalamitos.com

Race information
- Distance: 6 1/2 furlongs
- Surface: Dirt
- Track: left-handed
- Qualification: Fillies & Mares, three-years-old & older
- Weight: Base weights with allowances: 4-year-olds and up: 124 lbs. 3-year-olds: 120 lbs.
- Purse: US$200,000

The Great Lady M Stakes is a Grade II American Thoroughbred horse race for fillies and mares age three and older run over a distance of six and one half furlongs on the dirt held annually in July at Los Alamitos Race Course in Cypress, California.

== History ==
The event was inaugurated on 14 June 1941 as the Sequoia Handicap at Hollywood Park Racetrack and was easily won by movie mogul Louis B. Mayer owned filly Painted Veil in a time of 1:23 2/5 for the 7 furlong distance. During World War II the event was not run in 1942 and 1943 returning in 1944 in November as an event for two-year-old fillies over 6 furlongs. After the conclusion of World War II the event was held in September 1945. In 1946 Louis B. Mayer won the event for the third time with his three-year-old filly Honeymoon winning.

The event was not held from 1947 through 1958.

From 1959 the event was either held in April or in late May.

The event was reclassified as Grade III in 1986 and was upgraded to Grade II in 1990.

In 1979 the event was renamed to the A Gleam Handicap in honor of Calumet Farm's filly, A Gleam, whose five stakes wins in 1952 are the co-record for most stakes race wins in a single meet at Hollywood Park including the Milady Handicap in record time.| A Gleam was voted Hollywood Park's 1952 "Horse of the Meet."

In 2009, Evita Argentina became the first 3-year-old to win the A Gleam Handicap since Honeymoon did it in 1946.

With the closure of Hollywood Park Racetrack in 2013 the event was moved Los Alamitos Race Course and renamed to the Great Lady M Stakes in honor of the mare Great Lady M who won the 1980 A Gleam Handicap in an upset. Great Lady M earlier had equalled the track record winning the 1979 Orange Coast Handicap at Los Alamitos Race Course over 6 furlongs in 1:09 4/5. Great Lady M's success was more evident off the track as she was the dam of 1986 United States Horse of the Year Lady's Secret.

In 2021, the 2020 US Female Sprint Champion Gamine set a new winning margin by ten lengths defeating four other runners as the short 1/5 odds-on favorite.

In 2024, Sweet Azteca set a new track record for the 6 1/2–furlong distance winning by five lengths and bettered that record the following year defeating the odds-on favorite Kopion.

Sweet Azteca also won the event in 2025 and 2026 becoming the first triple winner of the event.

== Records ==
Speed record:

- 6 1/2 furlongs: 1:14.32 – Sweet Azteca (2025) (Track record)
- 7 furlongs: 1:20.40 – A. P. Assay (1998) (Equaled track record)

Margins:

- 10 lengths – Gamine (2021)

Most wins:

- 3 – Sweet Azteca (2024, 2025, 2026)

Most wins by an owner:

- 3 – Louis B. Mayer (1941, 1944, 1946)
- 3 – John G. Sikura (in partnership 2006, 2007, 2011)
- 3 – Pamela C. Ziebarth (2024, 2025, 2026)

Most wins by a jockey:

- 7 – Gary Stevens (1986, 1988, 1990, 1993, 1995, 1997, 2005)

Most wins by a trainer:

- 7 – Bob Baffert (2011, 2013, 2015, 2018, 2019, 2021, 2023)

== Winners ==
Year	Winner	Age	Jockey	Trainer	Owner	Distance	Time	Purse	Grade	Ref
At Los Alamitos – Great Lady M Stakes
2026	Sweet Azteca	6	Armando Ayuso	Richard Baltas	Pamela C. Ziebarth	6 1/2 furlongs	1:15.67	$201,000	II	
2025	Sweet Azteca	5	Juan J. Hernandez	Richard Baltas	Pamela C. Ziebarth	6 1/2 furlongs	1:14.32	$200,500	II	
2024	Sweet Azteca	4	Juan J. Hernandez	Michael McCarthy	Pamela C. Ziebarth	6 1/2 furlongs	1:14.33	$202,500	II	
2023	Eda	7	Juan J. Hernandez	Bob Baffert	Baoma	6 1/2 furlongs	1:15.06	$202,000	II	
2022	Becca Taylor	4	Juan J. Hernandez	Steven Miyadi	Nicholas B. Alexander	6 1/2 furlongs	1:15.25	$201,000	II	
2021	Gamine	4	John R. Velazquez	Bob Baffert	Michael Lund Peterson	6 1/2 furlongs	1:14.98	$200,000	II	
2020	Sneaking Out	5	Martin Garcia	Jerry Hollendorfer	KMN Racing	6 1/2 furlongs	1:14.62	$201,000	II	
2019	Marley's Freedom	5	Drayden Van Dyke	Bob Baffert	Cicero Farms	6 1/2 furlongs	1:15.33	$200,351	II	
2018	Marley's Freedom	4	Drayden Van Dyke	Bob Baffert	Cicero Farms	6 1/2 furlongs	1:15.00	$200,000	II	
2017	Skye Diamonds	4	Tiago Josue Pereira	William Spawr	Tom Acker, Allen Racing, Bloom Racing Stables	6 1/2 furlongs	1:14.79	$200,000	II	
2016	Finest City	4	Kent J. Desormeaux	Ian Kruljac	Seltzer Thoroughbreds	6 1/2 furlongs	1:14.48	$200,690	II	
2015	Fantastic Style	3	Rafael Bejarano	Bob Baffert	Kaleem Shah	6 1/2 furlongs	1:14.78	$200,750	II	
2014	Doinghardtimeagain	4	Mike E. Smith	Jerry Hollendorfer	Tommy Town Thoroughbred	6 1/2 furlongs	1:15.59	$200,500	II	
At Hollywood Park – A Gleam Handicap
2013	Book Review	4	Rafael Bejarano	Bob Baffert	Mary & Gary West	7 furlongs	1:22.75	$200,000	II	
2012	Switch	5	Garrett K. Gomez	John W. Sadler	CRK Stable	7 furlongs	1:24.37	$200,000	II	
2011	Irish Gypsy	5	Martin Garcia	Bob Baffert	Michael E. Pegram & John G. Sikura	7 furlongs	1:22.44	$200,000	II	
2010	Sweet August Moon	5	Victor Espinoza	Brian J. Koriner	Legacy Ranch & Team MacPherson	7 furlongs	1:21.77	$150,000	II	
2009	Evita Argentina	3	Joel Rosario	John W. Sadler	Three Sisters Thoroughbreds & Halo Farms	7 furlongs	1:21.80	$150,000	II	
2008	Dearest Trickski	4	Mike E. Smith	John W. Sadler	Tom Mankiewicz	7 furlongs	1:21.55	$150,000	II	
2007	Somethinaboutlaura	5	Victor Espinoza	Jerry Hollendorfer	John G. Sikura, George Todaro, Miller et al.	7 furlongs	1:21.93	$150,000	II	
2006	Somethinaboutlaura	4	Victor Espinoza	Jerry Hollendorfer	John G. Sikura, George Todaro, Miller et al.	7 furlongs	1:20.88	$150,000	II	
2005	Alphabet Kisses	4	Gary L. Stevens	Martin F. Jones	Harris Farms	7 furlongs	1:21.67	$150,000	II	
2004	Dream of Summer	5	Mike E. Smith	Juan J. Garcia	James Weigel	7 furlongs	1:21.00	$150,000	II	
2003	Cee's Elegance	6	Victor Espinoza	Doug F. O'Neill	Cee's Stable	7 furlongs	1:21.47	$250,000	II	
2002	Irguns Angel	4	Eddie Delahoussaye	Alfredo Marquez Casillas	Ron & Susie Anson	7 furlongs	1:22.50	$200,000	II	
2001	Go Go	4	Eddie Delahoussaye	Warren Stute	Alan & Paula Thomas	7 furlongs	1:22.19	$200,000	II	
2000	Honest Lady	4	Kent J. Desormeaux	Robert J. Frankel	Juddmonte Farms	7 furlongs	1:21.47	$200,000	II	
1999	Enjoy the Moment	4	David R. Flores	William Spawr	Farfellow Farms	7 furlongs	1:21.35	$200,000	II	
1998	A. P. Assay	4	Eddie Delahoussaye	J. Paco Gonzalez	John Toffan & Trudy McCaffery	7 furlongs	1:20.40	$250,000	II	
1997	Toga Toga Toga	5	Gary L. Stevens	Eduardo Inda	Stanley Bell	7 furlongs	1:22.60	$108,400	II	
1996	Igotrhythm	4	Eddie Delahoussaye	Robert J. Frankel	Edmund A. Gann	7 furlongs	1:21.40	$106,400	II	
1995	Angi Go	5	Gary L. Stevens	David E. Hofmans	Kenneth D. Hartley	7 furlongs	1:21.40	$107,700	II	
1994	Golden Klair (GB)	4	Chris McCarron	Darrell Vienna	No Problem Stable & Sido Stable	7 furlongs	1:22.00	$102,900	II	
1993	Bold Windy	4	Gary L. Stevens	Gary F. Jones	Raymond T. Dilbeck	7 furlongs	1:21.60	$110,700	II	
1992	Forest Fealty	5	Martin A. Pedroza	Brian A. Mayberry	Jan, Mace & Samantha Siegel	7 furlongs	1:22.00	$109,800	II	
1991	Survive	7	Russell Baze	Richard E. Mandella	Edward Allred & Randall D. Hubbard	7 furlongs	1:22.00	$107,400	II	
1990	Stormy But Valid	4	Gary L. Stevens	Brian A. Mayberry	Jan, Mace & Samantha Siegel	7 furlongs	1:21.20	$106,300	II	
1989	Daloma (FR)	5	Chris McCarron	Charles E. Whittingham	Enemy Stables & Mandysland Farm	7 furlongs	1:21.60	$81,650	III	
1988	Integra	4	Gary L. Stevens	Henry M. Moreno	George Aubin	7 furlongs	1:23.00	$79,950	III	
1987	Le L'Argent	5	Darrel McHargue	Richard E. Mandella	L. Jean & M. & R. Daley	7 furlongs	1:23.00	$82,400	III	
1986	Outstandingly	4	Gary L. Stevens	Laz Barrera	Harbor View Farm	7 furlongs	1:21.80	$79,850	III	
1985	Dontstop Themusic	5	Laffit Pincay Jr.	Randy Winick	Albert R. & Dana N. Broccoli	7 furlongs	1:21.40	$63,500		† Exhibition
1984	Lass Trump	4	Chris McCarron	Claude R. McGaughey III	Alan Samford	7 furlongs	1:21.20	$66,400		
1983	Matching	5	Ray Sibille	Steven L. Morguelan	Glencrest Farm & Morguelan	7 furlongs	1:22.40	$54,300		
1982	Happy Bride (IRE)	4	Walter Guerra	Laz Barrera	Dolly Green	6 furlongs	1:08.40	$53,200		
1981	She Can't Miss	4	Pat Valenzuela	D. Wayne Lukas	Elcee-H Stable	6 furlongs	1:09.00	$54,550		
1980	Great Lady M.	5	Pat Valenzuela	D. Wayne Lukas	Robert H. Spreen	6 furlongs	1:08.40	$53,050		
1979	Delice	4	Eddie Delahoussaye	Robert L. Wheeler	Michael G. Rutherford	6 furlongs	1:08.80	$43,100		
Sequoia Handicap
1978	Reminiscing	4	Laffit Pincay Jr.	Laz Barrera	Jacobs & Harbor View Farms	6 furlongs	1:09.60	$43,450		
1977	Just A Kick	5	Sandy Hawley	Roger E. Clapp	Mrs. Connie M. Ring	6 furlongs	1:09.40	$31,950		
1976	Winter Solstice	4	Jerry Lambert	Gordon C. Campbell	Bernard J. Ridder	6 furlongs	1:09.00	$33,500		
1975	Viva La Vivi	5	Laffit Pincay Jr.	Harold Hodosh	Hrotman & Malibu Stables	6 furlongs	1:08.40	$32,300	III	
1974	Lt.'s Joy	4	Laffit Pincay Jr.	Robert J. Frankel	W. A. Levin	6 furlongs	1:09.00	$27,250	III	
1973	Wingo Belle	5	Robert Nono	William A. Reavis	Mabell Coffer	6 furlongs	1:08.60	$32,650	III	
1972	§ Convenience	4	Robert Nono	Willard L. Proctor	Glen Hill Farm	6 furlongs	1:08.60	$32,650		
1971	Ribula	4	Salistino Burgos	Kenneth J. Anderson	Hal Clay & Stuart Strock	6 furlongs	1:09.20	$27,750		
1970	Lynne's Orphan	4	Jerry Lambert	Linwood J. Brooks	Lester Eaton & General W. W. Kratz	6 furlongs	1:09.00	$22,400		
1969	Indian Love Call	4	Álvaro Pineda	William J. Hirsch	Alfred G. Vanderbilt	6 furlongs	1:09.00	$22,200		
1968	Romanticism	5	Laffit Pincay Jr.	James W. Maloney	William Haggin Perry	6 furlongs	1:09.20	$22,550		
1967	Admirably	5	Walter Blum	Louis Glauburg	E. J. Anderson	6 furlongs	1:09.20	$22,850		
1966	Privileged	4	William Mahorney	Fred Harvey	Mr. & Mrs Hamilton M. Hughes	6 furlongs	1:09.60	$22,500		
1965	Kea	6	Donald Ross	Farrell W. Jones	Bresa Del Mar Ranch	6 furlongs	1:10.20	$22,250		
1964	Curious Clover	4	Kenneth Church	Clyde Turk	Louis R. Rowan	6 furlongs	1:09.80	$23,200		
1963	Linita	6	Ismael Valenzuela	Clyde Turk	Angelo & Herman Corradini & George Dorney	6 furlongs	1:09.60	$22,100		
1962	Nascania	5	Ray York	Wally Dunn	Louis R. Rowan	6 furlongs	1:09.80	$16,525		
1961	Linita	4	Johnny Longden	Clyde Turk	Angelo & Herman Corradini & George Dorney	6 furlongs	1:09.00	$16,275		
1960	Liberal Lady	5	Rudy Campas	Harris B. Brown	Mrs. Tilyou Christopher	6 furlongs	1:08.40	$16,850		
1959	Bug Brush	4	Angel Valenzuela	Robert L. Wheeler	Cornelius V. Whitney	6 furlongs	1:09.20	$16,725		
1947–1958		Race not held								
1946	Honeymoon	3	Jack Westrope	Graceton W. Philpot	Louis B. Mayer	7 furlongs	1:23.00	$28,050		
1945	Jerry Lee	5	Anthony Skoronski	C. Ralph West	Walter G. McCarty	7 furlongs	1:23.00	$17,685		
1944	Hemisphere	2	George Woolf	George M. Odom	Louis B. Mayer	6 furlongs	1:12.60	$12,875		2YO fillies
1942–1943		Race not held								
1941	Painted Veil	3	Jack Westrope	Graceton W. Philpot	Louis B. Mayer	7 furlongs	1:23.40	$10,925		

Legend:
All Weather Track Dirt
Notes:
† The event in 1985 was an exhibition race with four entries that had no wagering.
§ Ran as part of an entry

== See also ==
- List of American and Canadian Graded races
