= Ramblin' Guy =

American Thoroughbred racehorse

- Sire: Ogygian
- Grandsire: Damascus
- Dam: Sweet Ramblin Rose
- Damsire: Turn-To
- Sex: Stallion
- Foaled: 1991
- Country: United States
- Color: Bay
- Breeder: Mill Ridge Farm
- Owner: Jan, Mace & Samantha Siegel
- Trainer: Brian A. Mayberry
- Record: 10: 2-4-1
- Earnings: US$209,014

Major wins
- Hollywood Juvenile Championship Stakes (1993)
- Last updated on December 16, 2021

Ramblin' Guy (February 20, 1991 – September 3, 1994) was an American Thoroughbred racehorse sired by Ogygian and out of Sweet Ramblin Rose. He was best known for winning the Hollywood Juvenile Championship Stakes in 1993 as a two-year-old. At age three, Ramblin' Guy went over the rail in September 1994 at Del Mar Racetrack and broke his back, causing him to be humanely euthanized.

Ramblin Guy was bred by Alice Headley Chandler, owner of Mill Ridge Farm near Lexington, Kentucky and a National Museum of Racing and Hall of Fame inductee as one of its esteemed Pillars of the Turf. Purchased by the Siegel family, Ramblin' Guy made his racing debut on May 12, 1993, in a five and one-half furlong race for maidens. He won the Hollywood Park Racetrack event with a time of 51.35 seconds that broke the track record.

In addition to his win in the Hollywood Juvenile, Ramblin' Guy earned second-place finishes in the important Bashford Manor Stakes at Churchill Downs, the Del Mar Futurity at Del Mar Racetrack, and the Norfolk Stakes at Santa Anita Park.
