= Jorge Tejeira =

Panamanian jockey

Personal information
- Born: c. 1948 Panama
- Occupation: Jockey

Horse racing career
- Sport: Horse racing
- Career wins: 3,419

Major racing wins
- Metropolitan Handicap (1970); San Pasqual Handicap (1970); Stars and Stripes Turf Handicap (1970); Manhattan Handicap (1971); Arlington-Washington Lassie Stakes (1972); Hollywood Lassie Stakes (1972); Santa Ynez Stakes (1973); Bing Crosby Handicap (1974); Las Palmas Handicap (1974); Red Bank Handicap (1974); Arlington Handicap (1975); Hawthorne Gold Cup Handicap (1975); Las Flores Handicap (1975); Margate Handicap (1975); Molly Pitcher Handicap (1975); San Simeon Handicap (1975); Test Stakes (1975); Santa Anita Derby (1975); San Luis Rey Handicap (1975); Razorback Handicap (1976); Salvator Mile Handicap (1976); Santa Anita Handicap (1976); Matchmaker Stakes (1977); Rebel Stakes (1977); Sorority Stakes (1979); Great American Stakes (1982); Tremont Stakes (1982); Ak-Sar-Ben Handicap (1984); Cornhusker Handicap (1984); Colfax Maid Stakes (1984); Hanshin Cup Handicap (1985); Sapling Stakes (1999); Bahamas Stakes (2000)

Honors
- Parx Racing Hall of Fame

Significant horses
- Nodouble, Avatar, Royal Glint, Miss Tokyo
- Updated on July 27, 2008

Jorge Enrique Tejeira (born c. 1948) is a retired Panamanian jockey in United States Thoroughbred horse racing. He rode at venues across the United States and won a number of riding titles, including seasonal/annual championships at Philadelphia Park Racetrack in Pennsylvania and in California at Del Mar Racetrack and Santa Anita Park.

Anthony LaBruto was his friend and agent.

== Biography ==
Tejeira was born in a small town about two hundred miles from Panama City.

On June 16, 1976, he put his name in the record books by winning eight races in a single day. He won three at Keystone Racetrack near Philadelphia and five at Atlantic City Race Course in New Jersey.

Tejeira retired from racing having won 3,419 races.

Following its formation in 2011, Jorge Tejeira was inducted into the Parx Racing Hall of Fame.
