= Haggin Stakes =

The Haggin Stakes was an American Thoroughbred horse race run annually at Hollywood Park Racetrack in Inglewood, California. Raced in mid-June, it was open to two-year-old horses and was contested on dirt over a distance of five and one half furlongs.

Inaugurated in 1940, there was no race in 1942 and 1943. After the 1982 running the event was put on hiatus until being revived in 1996. After fifty years in which it was raced, the Haggin Stakes was canceled in 2005 following a shortage of entrants. It has not been run since.

The race was run in two divisions in 1940, 1941, 1944, 1963, 1964, and 1971.

Notable past winners include the 1959 Kentucky Derby winner, Tomy Lee and the 2001 Champion Sprinter and winner of the Breeders' Cup Sprint, Squirtle Squirt

== Winners 1996-2004 ==
Year	Winner	Jockey	Trainer	Owner	Time
2004	Chandtrue	Corey Nakatani	Robert B. Hess, Jr.	Harold F. Greene	1:04.02
2003	Stalking Tiger	Goncalino Almeida	Paul Aguirre	David Milch et al.	1:03.94
2002	Oberwald	Victor Espinoza	Mike Harrington	Heinz Steinmann	1:05.01
2001	Expected Program	Tyler Baze	James K. Chapman	Carolyn Chapman/Theresa McArthur	1:04.44
2000	Squirtle Squirt	Laffit Pincay, Jr.	Jose Garcia, Jr.	David J. Lanzman	1:04.17
1999	Knight Raider	Kent Desormeaux	Bruce Headley	Bruce Headley et al.	1:04.60
1998	Irrelevant	Martin Pedroza	Lyman Rollins	Melissa & Shirley Ford	1:05.20
1997	K O Punch	Chris McCarron	D. Wayne Lukas	The Thoroughbred Corp.	1:03.60
1996	Swiss Yodeler	Alex Solis	Mike Harrington	Heinz Steinmann	1:04.07

== Earlier winners ==
- 1982 - Full Choke
- 1981 - Unpredictable
- 1980 - Loma Malad
- 1979 - Murrtheblurr
- 1978 - Revielle
- 1977 - Windy's Duke
- 1976 - Bright Cross
- 1975 - Telly's Pop
- 1974 - The Bagel Prince
- 1973 - Century's Envoy
- 1972 - Doc Marcus
- 1971 - Royal Champion
- 1971 - D B Carm
- 1970 - Kelly's Caper
- 1969 - Cupid's Wings
- 1968 - Good Manners
- 1967 - Trondheim
- 1966 - Tumble Wind
- 1965 - Royal House
- 1964 - Ter - Chi - Berzo
- 1964 - Fleet son
- 1963 - The Scoundrel
- 1963 - Nevada P J
- 1962 - Kicapu Kid
- 1961 - Indian Blood
- 1960 - Olden Times
- 1959 - Psyches First
- 1958 - Tomy Lee
- 1957 - Music Man Fox
- 1956 - Lucky Mel
- 1955 - Mobile
- 1954 - Mr. Sullivan
- 1953 - James Session
- 1952 - Little Request
- 1951 - Bull Chicle
- 1950 - Hindu Star
- 1949 - Prince Abbey
- 1948 - Audacious Man
- 1947 - Roman In
- 1946 - Shim Malone
- 1945 - Style Prince
- 1944 - Realization
- 1944 - Sea Swallow
- 1941 - Outbid
- 1941 - Vain Prince
- 1940 - Ira Pan
- 1940 - Tin Pan Alley
