= Angels Flight Stakes =

- Class: Listed stakes
- Location: Santa Anita Park, Inglewood, California
- Inaugurated: 1963
- Race type: Thoroughbred - Flat racing
- Website: www.hollywoodpark.com

Race information
- Distance: 6 1/2 furlongs
- Track: dirt, left-handed
- Qualification: Three-year-old fillies
- Purse: $75,000 (2013)

The Angels Flight Stakes is an American Thoroughbred horse race held annually at Santa Anita Park in Inglewood, California. A Grade III event open to three-year-old fillies, it is contested on dirt over a distance of a six and one-half furlongs.

Inaugurated in 1963 as the Railbird Handicap at Hollywood Park Racetrack in Inglewood, California, it was a race for three-year-old horses of either sex until 1964 when it was changed to a race for fillies only. The event was originally named for railbirds, honoring those fans and/or handicappers who line the racetrack rail to be close to the race.

In 1965 the race was run in two divisions.

== Records ==
Speed record:

- 1:20.38 - Fantastic Style (2015)

Most wins by a jockey:

- 5 - Pat Valenzuela (1986, 1994, 2002, 2004, 2005)

Most wins by a trainer:

- 5 - Richard Mandella (1992, 1996, 1998, 1999, 2009)
- 5 - Bob Baffert (2011, 2015, 2017, 2018, 2020)

Most wins by an owner:

- 3 - Ellwood B. & Elizabeth E. Johnston (1966, 1967, 1972)

== Winners ==
Year	Winner	Age	Jockey	Trainer		Dist. (Furlongs)	Time	Win $	Gr.
2020	Gingham	3	Mike E. Smith	Bob Baffert	Sarah Kelly & Jane Wiltz	6.5 f	1:16.21	$47,400	L/R
2019	Miss My Rose †	3	Aaron Gryder	Philip D'Amato	A Venneri Racing, Inc. & Anthony Fanticola	7 f	1:24.30	$47,400	L/R
2018	Emboldened	3	Martin Garcia	Bob Baffert	Godolphin LLC	7 f	1:23.59	$48,900	L/R
2017	Faypien	3	Joseph Talamo	Bob Baffert	Baoma Corporation	7 f	1:23.21	$46,800	L/R
2016	Bellamentary	3	Martin Garcia	Philip D'Amato	Little Red Feather Racing & RM Racing	7 f	1:22.10	$47,400	L/R
2015	Fantastic Style	3	Rafael Bejarano	Bob Baffert	Kaleem Shah, Inc.	7 f	1:20.38	$47,400	B/T
2014	Delta Flower	3	Corey Nakatani	Jerry Hollendorfer	Gillian Campbell, Dan Clark, J. Hollendorfer, Richard Robertson, Greg Skoda	7 f	1:23.48	$47,400	B/T
Run as the Railbird Stakes at Hollywood Park
2013	Iotapa	3	Joe Talamo	John W. Sadler	Hronis Racing (Kosta & Pete Hronis)	7 f	1:23.40	$43,290	L/R
2012	Via Villaggio	3	Martin A. Pedroza	Jerry Hollendorfer	Steve Beneto	7 f	1:23.03	$60,000	G3
2011	May Day Rose	3	Joel Rosario	Bob Baffert	Kaleem Shah	7 f	1:22.26	$60,000	G3
2010	Tanda	3	Alex Solis	Dan Hendricks	Tommy Hutton	7 f	1:21.93	$60,000	G3
2009	Witty	3	Victor Espinoza	Richard E. Mandella	Ramona S. Bass, Claiborne Farm, Adele Dilschneider	7 f	1:21.74	$60,000	G3
2008	Million Dollar Run	3	Joel Rosario	Marcelo Polanco	Everest Stables Inc.	7 f	1:20.66	$66,240	G3
2007	Ashley's Kitty	3	Joe Talamo	Ted H. West	Oak West Farm	7 f	1:22.80	$66,600	G3
2006	Bettarun Fast	3	Aaron Gryder	Vladimir Cerin	Patricia & Stephen Fitzpatrick	7 f	1:23.29	$60,000	G3
2005	Short Route	3	Pat Valenzuela	Joseph Herrick	Donna & Bill Herrick	7 f	1:22.99	$65,820	G3
2004	Elusive Diva	3	Pat Valenzuela	Mark Glatt	John & Doris Konecny / Allen & Susan Branch	7 f	1:21.36	$65,760	G3
2003	Buffythecenterfold	3	Victor Espinoza	Melvin F. Stute	Frank Stronach & Brian Allen	7 f	1:22.54	$64,320	G3
2002	September Secret	3	Pat Valenzuela	Mike Machowsky	Lo Hi Stable (Mike Machowsky)	7 f	1:22.95	$63,780	G3
2001	Golden Ballet	3	Chris McCarron	Jenine Sahadi	Bill Heiligbrodt & Team Valor	7 f	1:21.57	$90,000	G2
2000	Cover Gal †	3	Laffit Pincay Jr.	Lance W. Stokes	William R. Peeples	7 f	1:22.57	$90,000	G2
1999	Olympic Charmer	3	Chris McCarron	Richard E. Mandella	Deborah McAnally	7 f	1:21.18	$90,000	G2
1998	Brulay	3	Gary Stevens	Richard E. Mandella	Ann & Jerry Moss	7 f	1:20.84	$64,260	G2
1997	I Ain't Bluffing	3	Eddie Delahoussaye	Ronald W. Ellis	Siegel family	7 f	1:22.77	$65,100	G2
1996	Supercilious	3	Corey Nakatani	Richard E. Mandella	Herman Sarkowsky	7 f	1:22.55	$64,260	G2
1995	Sleep Easy	3	Corey Nakatani	Robert J. Frankel	Juddmonte Farms	7 f	1:22.41	$64,600	G2
1994	Sportful Snob	3	Pat Valenzuela	John W. Sadler	Jack & Barbara Walter, et al.	7 f	1:21.94	$61,400	G2
1993	Afto	3	Paul Atkinson	Willard L. Proctor	Leonard H. Lavin	7 f	1:22.48	$64,500	G2
1992	She's Tops	3	Kent Desormeaux	Richard E. Mandella	Herman Sarkowsky	7 f	1:22.78	$66,500	G2
1991	Suziqcute	3	Chris McCarron	Ron McAnally	Frank E. Anderson	7 f	1:21.80	$62,800	G2
1990	Forest Fealty	3	Julio Garcia	Brian A. Mayberry	Siegel Family	7 f	1:21.60	$48,950	G3
1989	Imaginary Lady	3	Gary Stevens	D. Wayne Lukas	Larry R. French Jr. & D. Wayne Lukas	7 f	1:21.40	$47,800	G3
1988	Sheesham	3	Laffit Pincay, Jr.	Henry Moreno	Jack L. Finley	7 f	1:22.60	$49,700	G2
1987	Very Subtle	3	Bill Shoemaker	Melvin F. Stute	Ben Rochelle & Carl Grinstead	7 f	1:22.60	$45,750	G3
1986	Melair	3	Pat Valenzuela	John W. Sadler	Marianne Millard & Bea Rous	7 f	1:22.40	$48,600	G3
1985	Reigning Countess	3	Gary Stevens	Gary F. Jones	Saron Stable	7 f	1:22.40	$38,300	G3
1984	Mitterand	3	Eddie Delahoussaye	Randy Winick	Silver Star Stable & Randy Winick	7 f	1:22.20	$40,000	G3
1983	Ski Goggle	3	Chris McCarron	A. Thomas Doyle	Zenya Yoshida	7 f	1:23.40	$33,150	G3
1982	Faneuil Lass	3	Terry Lipham	D. Wayne Lukas	Cleber J. Massey	7 f	1:23.20	$32,400	G3
1981	Cherokee Frolic	3	Gary Cohen	William A. Cole	Carol Friedfertig	7 f	1:22.20	$32,400	G3
1980	Cinegita	3	Terry Lipham	D. Wayne Lukas	Larry R. French Jr. & Barry A. Beal	7 f	1:20.80	$31,450	G3
1979	Eloquent	3	Don Pierce	Laz Barrera	Harbor View Farm	7 f	1:20.60	$26,800	G3
1978	Eximious	3	Bill Shoemaker	L. Ross Fenstermaker	Fred W. Hooper	7 f	1:22.20	$25,550	G3
1977	Taisez Vous	3	Fernando Toro	Robert L. Wheeler	Vernon & Ann Eachus	7 f	1:22.60	$22,650	G3
1976	Hail Hilarious	3	Don Pierce	Neil D. Drysdale	Saron Stable	7 f	1:21.40	$20,550	G3
1975	Raise Your Skirts	3	William Mahorney	Barney Willis	John Woolsey & Barney Willis	7 f	1:20.80	$19,350	G3
1974	Modus Vivendi	3	Don Pierce	Gordon C. Campbell	Bernard J. Ridder	7 f	1:21.60	$19,800	G3
1973	Sandy Blue	3	Don Pierce	A. Thomas Doyle	Circle C Ranch & Robert Witt	7 f	1:21.80	$20,250	G3
1972	Impressive Style	3	Laffit Pincay Jr.	Fred A. Miquelez	Ellwood B. & Elizabeth E. Johnston	7 f	1:21.00	$16,600	
1971	Turkish Trousers	3	Bill Shoemaker	Charles E. Whittingham	Elizabeth A. Keck	7 f	1:21.80	$17,200	
1970	Bold Jil	3	Bill Shoemaker	Charles A. Comiskey	George Putnam	7 f	1:21.40	$12,750	
1969	Tipping Time	3	Ismael Valenzuela	Robert G. Craft	Rex Ellsworth	7 f	1:21.40	$13,350	
1968	Morgaise	3	Jerry Lambert	James W. Maloney	William Haggin Perry	7 f	1:21.20	$13,250	
1967	Forgiving	3	Jerry Lambert	James Wallace	Ellwood B. & Elizabeth E. Johnston	7 f	1:22.20	$17,500	
1966	Fleet Treat	3	Álvaro Pineda	James Wallace	Ellwood B. & Elizabeth E. Johnston	7 f	1:22.00	$16,000	
1965-1	Mine Lovely	3	Joseph Baze	Robert L. Wheeler	Peter McBean	7 f	1:22.60	$15,625	
1965-2	Gala Host	3	Ismael Valenzuela	Riley S. Cofer	May Stock Farm	7 f	1:21.60	$15,875	
1965-2	Mine Lovely	3	Joseph Baze	Robert L. Wheeler	Peter McBean	7 f	1:22.60	$15,625	
1964	Fran La Femme	3	Miguel Yanez	Harry F. Albrecht	Green Thumb Stable	7 f	1:22.00	$13,800	
1963	Well Ordered	3	Alex Maese	William J. Hirsch	King Ranch	7 f	1:22.20	$14,600	

- † 2019: Sneaking Out was disqualified from first for interfering with Miss My Rose when coming down the stretch.
- † 2000: Abby Girl finished first but was disqualified to fifth.
