= A Gleam =

American-bred Thoroughbred racehorse

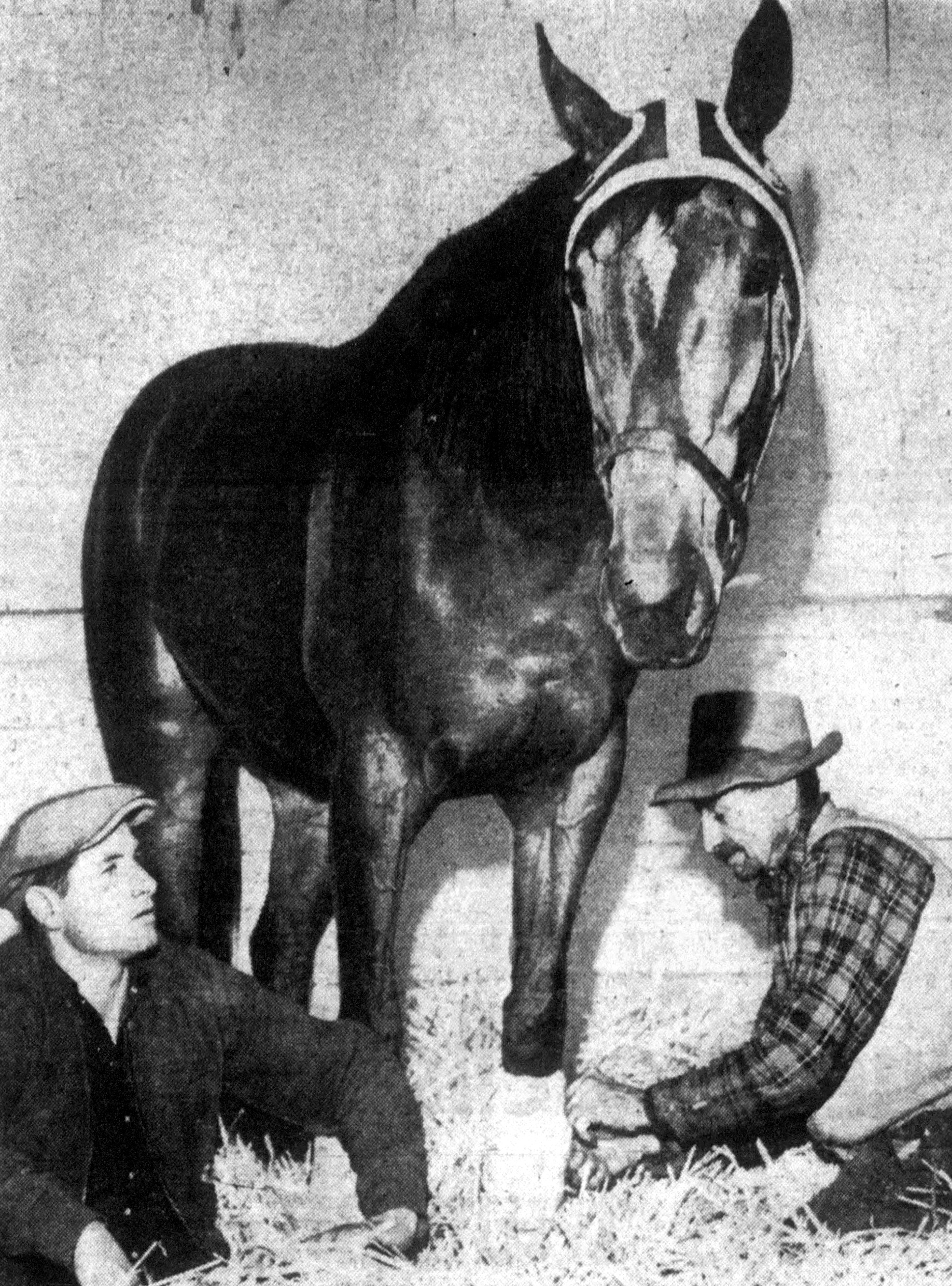
- A Gleam, circa 1953
- Sire: Blenheim
- Grandsire: Blandford
- Dam: Twilight Tear
- Damsire: Bull Lea
- Sex: Filly
- Foaled: 1949
- Country: United States
- Colour: Bay
- Breeder: Calumet Farm
- Owner: Calumet Farm
- Trainer: Horace A. Jones
- Record: 30: 12-8-7
- Earnings: US$251,395

Major wins
- Princess Pat Stakes (1951); Cinema Handicap (1952); Debonair Stakes (1952); Hollywood Oaks (1952); Westerner Stakes (1952); Milady Handicap (1952, 1953); Malibu Sequet Stakes (1953)

Honours
- A Gleam Handicap at Hollywood Park (1979–2013)
- Last updated on 3 July 2020

A Gleam (foaled 1949 in Kentucky) was an American Thoroughbred racehorse who set a Hollywood Park Racetrack record with five straight stakes races in 1952.

== Breeding ==
A Gleam was bred and raced by Calumet Farm. Her sire was British born Blenheim, the winner of the 1930 Epsom Derby who, after being sold to an American breeding syndicate, became the Leading sire in North America in 1941. A Gleam's dam was Calumet's U.S. Racing Hall of Fame inductee, Twilight Tear.

== Racing career ==
A Gleam was conditioned for racing by future U.S. Racing Hall of Fame inductee, Jimmy Jones. In 1951 at Chicago's Washington Park Racetrack, she won the Princess Pat Stakes, a top race for two-year-old fillies.

It was as a three-year-old that she developed into one of the top fillies in the United States. Included in her five wins at Hollywood Park was Milady Handicap which she won in a track record time of 1:21 3/5 for seven furlongs on dirt. In her last year of racing at age four, A Gleam won the Malibu Sequet Stakes at Santa Anita Park and her second straight edition of the Milady Handicap at Hollywood Park.

== Broodmare ==
A Gleam served as a broodmare for Calumet Farm. Of her foals, the filly A Glitter (b. 1955), sired by Khaled, was a successful runner who won major races such as the Coaching Club American Oaks, Monmouth Oaks, and the Modesty Handicap. A Gleam's most successful earner in racing was sired by Herbager. Their multiple stakes winning colt Gleaming (b. 1968) earned $469,245.

== Honors ==
In 1979, Hollywood Park Racetrack renamed the Sequoia Handicap in A Gleam's honor.

== Pedigree ==
Pedigree of A Gleam
| Sire Blenheim | Blandford | Swynford | John O'Gaunt |
| Sire Blenheim | Blandford | Swynford | Canterbury Pilgrim |
| Sire Blenheim | Blandford | Blanche | White Eagle |
| Sire Blenheim | Blandford | Blanche | Black Cherry |
| Sire Blenheim | Malva | Charles O'Malley | Desmond |
| Sire Blenheim | Malva | Charles O'Malley | Goody Two-Shoes |
| Sire Blenheim | Malva | Wild Arum | Robert le Diable |
| Sire Blenheim | Malva | Wild Arum | Marliacea |
| Dam Twilight Tear | Bull Lea | Bull Dog | Teddy |
| Dam Twilight Tear | Bull Lea | Bull Dog | Plucky Liege |
| Dam Twilight Tear | Bull Lea | Rose Leaves | Ballot |
| Dam Twilight Tear | Bull Lea | Rose Leaves | Colonial |
| Dam Twilight Tear | Lady Lark | Blue Larkspur | Black Servant |
| Dam Twilight Tear | Lady Lark | Blue Larkspur | Blossom Time |
| Dam Twilight Tear | Lady Lark | Ladana | Lucullite |
| Dam Twilight Tear | Lady Lark | Ladana | Adana |
