= Princess Stakes =

- Class: Discontinued Grade II
- Location: Hollywood Park Racetrack; Inglewood, California
- Inaugurated: 1966
- Race type: Thoroughbred - Flat racing
- Website: www.hollywoodpark.com

Race information
- Distance: 1 1/16 miles (8.5 furlongs)
- Surface: Dirt
- Track: Left-handed
- Qualification: Three-year-olds Fillies
- Weight: Assigned
- Purse: $100,000

The Princess Stakes was an American Thoroughbred horse race for three-year-old fillies held in June at Hollywood Park Racetrack in Inglewood, California. The Grade II event was run over a distance of 1 1/16 miles (8.5 furlongs).

== Past winners of the Princess Stakes ==
Year	Winner	Jockey	Trainer	Owner	Time
2001	Starrer	Chris McCarron	David Hofmans	George Krikorian	1:41.90
2000	Queenie Belle	Brice Blanc	Ben Cecil	Gary Seidler	1:43.57
1999	Excellent Meeting	Kent Desormeaux	Bob Baffert	Golden Eagle Farm	1:41.73
1998	Sweet and Ready	Chris McCarron	Jeffrey Morris	Drs. K. & V. Jayaraman	1:42.52
1997	Freeport Flight	Eddie Delahoussaye	Carla Gaines	Warren B. Williamson	1:43.99
1996	Listening	Chris McCarron	Ronald McAnally	Janis R. Whitham	1:42.96
1995	Favored One	Alex Solis	Michael Puhich	Mike Pegram	1:43.98
1994	Sardula	Eddie Delahoussaye	Brian A. Mayberry	Ann & Jerry Moss	1:42.57
1993	Fit to Lead	Eddie Delahoussaye	Richard Mandella	Jim Colbert, Randall D. Hubbard, Connie Sczesny	1:42.52
1992	Race the Wild Wind	Chris McCarron	Ronald McAnally	Brandon & Marianne Chase	1:41.27
1991	Winglet	Patrick Valenzuela	Richard Lundy	Allen E. Paulson	1:43.10

== Earlier winners ==
- 1990 - A Wild Ride
- 1989 - Imaginary Lady
- 1988 - Clean Lines
- 1987 - Ransomed Captive
- 1986 - Melair
- 1985 - Fran's Valentine
- 1984 - Gene's Lady
- 1983 - Sweet Diane
- 1982 - Faneuil Lass
- 1981 - Balletomane
- 1980 - Disconiz
- 1979 - Prize Spot
- 1978 - B. Thoughtful
- 1977 - Taisez Vous
- 1976 - Hail Hilarious
- 1975 - Call Me Proper
- 1974 - Lucky Spell
- 1973 - Card Table
- 1972 - Le Cle
- 1971 - Turkish Trousers
- 1970 - Thoroly Blue
- 1969 - Tipping Time
- 1968 - Miss Ribot
- 1967 - Gamely
- 1966 - Miss Kat Bird
