= Nasomo =

American-bred Thoroughbred racehorse

- Sire: Nasrullah
- Grandsire: Nearco
- Dam: Blue Eyed Momo
- Damsire: War Admiral
- Sex: Stallion
- Foaled: 1956
- Country: United States
- Color: Chestnut
- Owner: Pauline Woolworth
- Earnings: US$75,080

Major wins
- Central Park Purse (1960)

Nasomo (1956–1968) was an American Thoroughbred racehorse from the Pine Tree Stables, registered in Freeport, Bahamas. He was a son of Nasrullah. Nasomo was owned by Mrs. Pauline Woolworth of Winthrop, Massachusetts, and had lifetime earnings of US$75,080.

== Track record at Belmont Park ==
On September 4, 1959, the three-year-old colt eclipsed the track record at Belmont Park, covering the mile and a sixteenth course in 1:40 4/5. Nasomo equaled the mile record at Belmont Park, 1:34 4/5, then shared by Count Fleet and Blessbull.

Ridden by Rogelio Trejos, the thoroughbred won the feature race in a time which was four-fifths of a second faster than the standard posted by Ricci Tavi in 1957. In the $7,500 Central Park Purse, an April 25, 1960 feature race at Aqueduct Racetrack, Nasomo was at 10 to 1 odds when he triumphed in 1:36 for the mile race, while being ridden by future Hall of Fame inductee, Bobby Ussery.

== Deceptive performer ==
In his book, "Betting Thoroughbreds", Steven Davidowitz described Nasomo as "a slow-breaking Silky Sullivan type." Davidowitz studied Nasomo's workout patterns, which the author found predicated a greatly improved performance in competition. In the late spring of 1961 Davidowitz perused Nasomo's past performance charts at Gulfstream Park. He looked particularly at the thoroughbred's half-mile workout from the starting gate which was affixed to the bottom of Nasomo's chart. ".47 bg (bay gelding)" leaped off the page at Davidowitz!
