= Cinderella Stakes =

The Cinderella Stakes is an American Thoroughbred horse race run annually at Hollywood Park Racetrack in Inglewood, California. It is open to two-year-old fillies and is contested on Cushion Track synthetic dirt over a distance of five and one half furlongs. The Listed race currently offers a purse of $70,000 added.

Inaugurated in the fall of 1950 as a race for three-year-old fillies and set at a distance of a mile and one-sixteenth, the first winner was Alfred G. Vanderbilt's filly Next Move who went on to earn that year's American Champion Three-Year-Old Filly honors.

== Past winners ==
- 2012 - Miss Empire (Kevin Krigger)
- 2011 - Killer Graces (Joseph Talamo)
- 2010 - Shell Air
- 2009 - Well Deserved
- 2008 - Trifecta King
- 2007 - Wonderful Luck
- 2006 - Richwoman
- 2005 - River's Prayer
- 2004 - Souvenir Gift
- 2003 - Yogis Polar Bear
- 2002 - Magic Smoke
- 2001 - Georgias Storm
- 2000 - Golden Ballet
- 1999 - Magicalmysterycat
- 1998 - Western Woman
- 1997 - Bent Creek City
- 1996 - Starry Ice
- 1982 - Barzell
- 1981 - Orphans Art
- 1980 - Sweet Amends
- 1979 - Table Hands
