= California Juvenile Stakes =

The California Juvenile Stakes was an American Thoroughbred horse race for two-year-old horses held annually in Northern California. Historically classified as a Grade III event, the race served as a testing ground for young talent on the West Coast, often acting as a precursor to the Triple Crown series for maturing colts and geldings.

== History ==
The race was a long-standing fixture at Bay Meadows Racetrack in San Mateo, California, until that facility's closure in 2008. Following the closing of Bay Meadows, the event was intermittently hosted at Golden Gate Fields in Albany, California, which remained the primary venue for major Northern California racing until its own closure on June 9, 2024.During its tenure at Bay Meadows, the race was contested on a dirt surface at distances ranging from 1 mile to 1 1/16 miles. In its later years at Golden Gate Fields, the race was run on the synthetic tapeta surface.

== Notable Winners ==
Several winners of the California Juvenile Stakes achieved success in the racing world:

- Desert Wine (1982): After winning this stakes, Desert Wine went on to place second in both the Kentucky Derby and the Preakness Stakes in 1983.
- Globalize (1999): Trained by Jerry Hollendorfer, Globalize was a leading Northern California contender who eventually won the Grade II Spiral Stakes.
- Mountain Skier (1995): Set a high-performance standard for the race during the mid-90s, recording one of the highest Beyer Speed Figures in the race's history.
