= Bayakoa Stakes (Los Alamitos) =

- Class: Grade III
- Location: Los Alamitos Race Course; Cypress, California
- Inaugurated: 1981 (as Silver Belles Handicap at Hollywood Park Racetrack)
- Race type: Thoroughbred - Flat racing
- Website: Los Alamitos

Race information
- Distance: 1 1/16 miles
- Surface: dirt
- Track: left-handed
- Qualification: Fillies and Mares three-years-old and older
- Weight: Base weights with allowances: 4-year-olds and older: 124 lbs. 3-year-olds: 121 lbs.
- Purse: $100,000 (since 2019)

The Bayakoa Stakes is a Grade III American Thoroughbred horse race for fillies and mares age three and older run over a distance of one and one sixteenth miles (8 1/2 furlongs) on the dirt held annually in early December at Los Alamitos Race Course in Cypress, California. The event currently offers a purse of $100,000.

== History ==
The inaugural running of the race was on 13 December 1981 as the Silver Belles Handicap at Hollywood Park Racetrack in Inglewood, California over a distance of 1 1/8 miles and was won by the imported five-year-old Argentine-bred mare Happy Guess who was ridden by US Hall of Fame jockey Bill Shoemaker in a time of 1:49 3/5.

In 1983 the American Graded Stakes Committee classified the event with Grade III status. In 1986 the race was upgraded once more to Grade II.

In 1990 the distance of the event was decreased to 1 1/16 miles.

The race was renamed the Bayakoa Handicap in 1994 in honor of U.S. Racing Hall of Fame inductee, Bayakoa.

On 7 December 1997, Sharp Cat won the Bayakoa Stakes in the first walkover in the history of Hollywood Park Racetrack.

In 2006 the event was run on a new synthetic Cushion Track which was installed at Hollywood Park.

With the closure of Hollywood Park Racetrack in 2013 the event was moved Los Alamitos Race Course and was run with stakes allowance conditions as the Bayakoa Stakes.

The event was not held in 1987, 2015 and in 2018.

The event was held at Del Mar Racetrack in 2016 with handicap conditions and in 2024 as a stakes event on the undercard of the Breeders' Cup.

In 2019 the event was downgraded to Grade III status.

== Records ==
Speed record: (at current distance of 1^{1}/16 miles (8.5 furlongs)

- 1:40.38 - Briecat (2008)

Most wins:

- 2 - Manistique (1998, 1999)
- 2 - Starrer (2001, 2002)
- 2 - Star Parade (2003, 2005)
- 2 - Hope Road (2024, 2025)

Most wins by a jockey:

- 5 - Chris McCarron (1985, 1990, 1991, 1993, 1996)
- 5 - Victor Espinoza (2003, 2004, 2006, 2009, 2014)

Most wins by a trainer:

- 7 - Bob Baffert (2011, 2014, 2016, 2021, 2023, 2024, 2025)

Most wins by an owner:

- 3 - George Krikorian (2001, 2002, 2004)

== Winners ==
Year	Winner	Age	Jockey	Trainer	Owner	Distance	Time	Purse	Grade	Ref
At Del Mar – Bayakoa Stakes
2025	Hope Road	4	Juan J. Hernandez	Bob Baffert	Cicero Farms	1 mile	1:36.51	$101,500	III	
2024	Hope Road	3	Juan J. Hernandez	Bob Baffert	Cicero Farms	1 mile	1:36.51	$200,500	III	
At Los Alamitos
2023	Midnight Memories	4	Juan J. Hernandez	Bob Baffert	Karl Watson, Mike Pegram, Paul Weitman	1 1/16 miles	1:42.84	$101,000	III	
2022	Race not held									
2021	As Time Goes By	6	Flavien Prat	Bob Baffert	Derrick Smith, Mrs. John Magnier & Michael Tabor	1 1/16 miles	1:42.97	$100,500	III	
2020	Proud Emma	6	Juan J. Hernandez	Peter L. Miller	Gem Incorporated & Tom Kagele	1 1/16 miles	1:42.40	$100,000	III	
2019	Queen Bee to You	5	Ruben Fuentes	Andrew Lerner	Christopher St. Hilaire & Adam Vali	1 1/16 miles	1:44.21	$100,351	III	
2018	Race not held									
2017	Majestic Heat	5	Mike E. Smith	Richard E. Mandella	Madeline Auerbach, Bardy Farm & Ron McCauley	1 1/16 miles	1:42.15	$201,035	II	
At Del Mar – Bayakoa Handicap
2016	Vale Dori (ARG)	4	Mike E. Smith	Bob Baffert	Sheikh Mohammed Khalifa Al Maktoum	1 1/16 miles	1:44.79	$201,035	II	
2015	Race not held									
At Los Alamitos – Bayakoa Stakes
2014	Tiz Midnight	4	Victor Espinoza	Bob Baffert	Karl Watson, Mike Pegram, Paul Weitman	1 1/16 miles	1:41.62	$200,250	II	
At Hollywood Park
2013	Broken Sword	3	Joel Rosario	Jerry Hollendorfer	Mark Dedomenico, Jerry Hollendorfer, George Todaro	1 1/16 miles	1:42.98	$151,000	II	
Bayakoa Handicap
2012	Lady of Fifty	3	Martin Garcia	Jerry Hollendorfer	Jerry Hollendorfer & George Todaro	1 1/16 miles	1:44.36	$200,000	II	
2011	Ellafitz	4	Martin Garcia	Bob Baffert	D & E Racing (Sivage)	1 1/16 miles	1:42.69	$150,000	II	
2010	Washington Bridge	3	Rafael Bejarano	Jerry Hollendorfer	Mark DeDomenico & Jerry Hollendorfer	1 1/16 miles	1:44.25	$150,000	II	
2009	Zardana (BRZ)	5	Victor Espinoza	John Shirreffs	Arnold Zetcher	1 1/16 miles	1:42.24	$150,000	II	
2008	Briecat	3	Jon Court	Vladimir Cerin	David & Holly Wilson	1 1/16 miles	1:40.38	$150,000	II	
2007	Romance Is Diane	3	Michael C. Baze	Mike R. Mitchell	Senji Nishimura	1 1/16 miles	1:40.90	$150,000	II	
2006	Foxysox (GB)	3	Victor Espinoza	Carla Gaines	Warren B. Williamson	1 1/16 miles	1:41.84	$150,000	II	
2005	Star Parade (ARG)	6	Martin A. Pedroza	Darrell Vienna	Gary A. Tanaka	1 1/16 miles	1:41.96	$150,000	II	
2004	Hollywood Story	3	Victor Espinoza	John Shirreffs	George Krikorian	1 1/16 miles	1:41.11	$150,000	II	
2003	Star Parade (ARG)	4	Victor Espinoza	Darrell Vienna	J. Doug McClure	1 1/16 miles	1:41.02	$150,000	II	
2002	Starrer	4	Pat Valenzuela	John Shirreffs	George Krikorian	1 1/16 miles	1:41.74	$150,000	II	
2001	Starrer	3	Jerry D. Bailey	David E. Hofmans	George Krikorian	1 1/16 miles	1:42.52	$150,000	II	
2000	Feverish	5	Eddie Delahoussaye	Dan L. Hendricks	Pam & Martin Wygod	1 1/16 miles	1:42.26	$150,000	II	
1999	Manistique	4	Corey Nakatani	John Shirreffs	505 Farms	1 1/16 miles	1:43.16	$150,000	II	
1998	Manistique	3	Gary L. Stevens	John Shirreffs	505 Farms	1 1/16 miles	1:42.51	$98,000	II	
1997	Sharp Cat	3	Alex O. Solis	D. Wayne Lukas	The Thoroughbred Corp.	1 1/16 miles	1:42.68	$100,000	II	Walkover
1996	Listening	3	Chris McCarron	Ron McAnally	Janis R. Whitham	1 1/16 miles	1:42.66	$108,200	II	
1995	Pirate's Revenge	4	Chris Antley	Ronald W. Ellis	Pam & Martin Wygod	1 1/16 miles	1:41.80	$106,900	II	
1994	Thirst for Peace	5	Alex O. Solis	Sanford Shulman	Clear Valley Stables	1 1/16 miles	1:42.28	$108,500	II	
Silver Belles Handicap
1993	Golden Klair (GB)	4	Chris McCarron	Darrell Vienna	No Problem Stable et al.	1 1/16 miles	1:41.20	$108,500	II	
1992	Brought to Mind	5	Pat Valenzuela	Ron McAnally	Tadahiro Hotehama	1 1/16 miles	1:42.62	$110,200	II	
1991	Paseana (ARG)	4	Chris McCarron	Ron McAnally	Jenny & Sidney Craig	1 1/16 miles	1:42.70	$107,700	II	
1990	Fantastic Look	4	Chris McCarron	Gary F. Jones	John C. Mabee	1 1/16 miles	1:42.40	$107,200	II	
1989	Approved to Fly	3	Alex O. Solis	Victor L. Garcia	Barry & Judith Becker	1 1/8 miles	1:48.20	$108,400	II	
1988	Nastique	4	Bill Shoemaker	Stephen A. DiMauro	Chaus Stables	1 1/8 miles	1:48.00	$121,800	II	
1987	Race not held									
1986	Family Style	3	Gary L. Stevens	D. Wayne Lukas	Eugene V. Klein	1 1/8 miles	1:50.00	$137,150	II	
1985	Love Smitten	4	Chris McCarron	Edwin J. Gregson	Gail & Del Chase	1 1/8 miles	1:47.80	$120,100	III	
1984	Dontstop Themusic	4	Terry Lipham	Randell W. Winick	Albert R. & Dana N. Broccoli	1 1/8 miles	1:50.20	$123,750	III	
1983	Sweet Diane	3	Ray Sibille	Robert J. Frankel	Harry W. Stone, Pinwheel Farm & Milt Bronson	1 1/8 miles	1:48.00	$112,900	III	
1982	Sierva (ARG)	4	Laffit Pincay Jr.	Henry Moreno	R. Charlene Parks	1 1/8 miles	1:48.40	$113,900		
1981	Happy Guess (ARG)	5	Bill Shoemaker	Ron McAnally	James Mamakos & Dr. Marc Stubrin	1 1/8 miles	1:49.60	$107,100		

Legend:
All Weather Track Dirt

== See also ==
- List of American and Canadian Graded races
