= Henry M. Moreno =

American horse trainer and owner (1929–2020)

Personal information
- Born: September 17, 1929 Corona, California, United States
- Died: February 2, 2020 (aged 90) Sierra Madre, California, United States
- Occupation: Trainer

Horse racing career
- Sport: Horse racing
- Career wins: 886

Major racing wins
- Thoroughbred races: Milady Handicap (1964, 1976); Ramona Handicap (1964, 1974, 1983); Vanity Handicap (1965,1982, 1993); Wilshire Handicap (1965, 1975); Stars and Stripes Handicap (1968); Monrovia Handicap (1973); Santa Paula Stakes (1973); Santa Margarita Handicap (1974, 1975); Hawthorne Handicap (1975, 1988); Las Flores Handicap (1975); Ladies Handicap (1975, 1976); Las Palmas Handicap (1974); Princess Stakes (1974); Santa Monica Stakes (1974); Hawthorne Handicap (1975, 1988); Inglewood Handicap (1975); Autumn Days Handicap (1975); Beverly Hills Handicap (1976, 1982); San Gorgonio Handicap (1976, 1977, 1987); Carleton F. Burke Handicap (1978); Del Mar Handicap (1978); Fantasy Stakes (1978, 1980); Bayakoa Handicap (1982); Dahlia Handicap (1982, 1991); Silver Belles Handicap (1982); Yerba Buena Handicap (1982, 1985); Clement L. Hirsch Stakes (1983); Golden Harvest Handicap (1983); Matriarch Stakes (1983); Yellow Ribbon Stakes (1983); Santa Maria Handicap (1983); Junior Miss Stakes (1987); Las Virgenes Stakes (1987, 1991); Santa Anita Oaks (1987, 1991); A Gleam Handicap (1988); Ancient Title Stakes (1989); Los Angeles Handicap (1989); Railbird Stakes (1989); Chandelier Stakes (1990); Sorrento Stakes (1990); California Cup Distaff (1993); Vanity Handicap (1993); California Cup Sprint (1997); California Cup Mile (1998); Dayjur Handicap (2000)

Racing awards
- Leading trainer at Del Mar (1986)

Significant horses
- Lite Light, Sangue, Re Toss, Basstonera II, Sam Who, Timely Assertion Tizna

Henry Moreno (September 17, 1929 – February 23, 2020) was an American trainer and owner of both American Quarter horses and Thoroughbreds.

== Background ==
Moreno grew up on his family's Quarter Horse ranch in southern California. As a young man, he served with the United States Army during the Korean War after which he embarked on a career in horse racing as a trainer of Quarter Horses before switching to Thoroughbreds in 1961. He is best known for his work with female horses and had success with several racemares he imported from South America.

== Thoroughbred racing ==
Henry Moreno won numerous top level stakes in California with different horses. Of them, the Irish-bred racemare Sangue, who won the Prix de Psyché in France at age three, began racing in the United States as a four-year-old in 1982. Under Moreno's care, the daughter of Lyphard won three Grade 1, four Grade 2, and two Grade 3 races in two years of racing.
