= Santa Maria Stakes =

- Class: Grade II
- Location: Santa Anita Park; Arcadia, California, United States
- Inaugurated: 1934
- Race type: Thoroughbred – Flat racing
- Website: www.santaanita.com

Race information
- Distance: 1 1/16 miles (8.5 furlongs)
- Surface: Dirt
- Track: left-handed
- Qualification: Fillies and Mares, four years old & up
- Weight: Assigned
- Purse: $200,000

The Santa Maria Stakes is an American Grade II Thoroughbred horse race run annually in late May at Santa Anita Park in Arcadia, California. A race for fillies and mares age four and older, it is contested on Pro-Ride synthetic dirt over a distance of one and one-sixteenth miles (8.5 furlongs).

Since the inaugural running in 1934, the Santa Maria Stakes has been contested at various distances:

- 6 furlongs: 1934–1936, 1938–1940
- 3 furlongs: 1941
- 8 furlongs (1 mile): 1946, 1947, 1952–1953
- 7 furlongs: 1954–1956
- 8.5 furlongs (1 1/16 miles): 1957–present

The Santa Maria was run as a handicap from 1952 through 2010 and was raced in two divisions in 1983 and 1984.

There was no race in 1937, nor from 1948 through 1951.

The Santa Maria has been downgraded from a Grade I to a Grade II stakes race.

== Records ==
Speed record: (at current distance of 1 1/16 miles)

- 1:40.95 – Exotic Wood (1998) (on natural dirt)

Most wins:

- 2 – Gay Style (1975, 1976)
- 2 – Star Parade (2004, 2006)

Most wins by a jockey:

- 6 – Laffit Pincay, Jr. (1973, 1974, 1979, 1983, 1984, 1985)

Most wins by a trainer:

- 7 - Bob Baffert (2002, 2012, 2017, 2020, 2021, 2023, 2025)

Most wins by an owner:

- 3 – Gary A. Tanaka (2001, 2004, 2006)

== Winners ==
Year	Winner	Age	Jockey	Trainer	Owner	Time
2026	Simply Joking	4	Emisael Jaramillo	Michael W. McCarthy	Berkels0813 LLC, CMNLTH LLC, Grantley Acres and Ryan Conner	1:42.38
2025	Richi (CHI)	5	Antonio Fresu	Bob Baffert	Hill 'n' Dale Equine Holding LLC (J. G. Sikura) and Stud Vendaval Inc.	1:42.60
2024	Coffee in Bed	4	Mike E. Smith	Richard E. Mandella	Spendthrift Farm LLC	1:45.16
2023	Adare Manor	4	Juan J. Hernandez	Bob Baffert	Michael Lund Petersen	1:43.10
2022	Private Mission	4	Juan Hernandez	Sean McCarthy	Baoma Corporation	1:43.46
2021	As Time Goes By	4	Mike E. Smith	Bob Baffert	Magnier/ Tabor/ Smith	1:43.77
2020	Fighting Mad	4	Abel Cedillo	Bob Baffert	Mary & Gary West	1:42.12
2019	La Force	5	Drayden Van Dyke	Patrick Gallagher	Roberta Williford, Ward Williford, Charles N. Winner	1:45.92
2018	Unique Bella	4	Mike E. Smith	Jerry Hollendorfer	Don Alberto Stable	1:43.45
2017	Vale Dori	5	Mike E. Smith	Bob Baffert	Sheikh Mohammad Bin Khalifa Al Maktoum	1:43.19
2016	Tara's Tango	4	Martin Garcia	Jerry Hollendorfer	Stonestreet Stables	1:44.48
2015	Warren's Veneda	5	Tyler Baze	Craig Anthony Lewis	Benjamin C. Warren	1:43.18
2014	Iotapa	4	Joseph Talamo	John W. Sadler	Hronis Racing	1:42.30
2013	Great Hot (BRZ)	5	Gary Stevens	A. C. Avila	Coudelaria Jessica, Inc	1:43.08
2012	Ellafitz	5	Martin Garcia	Bob Baffert	D and E Racing	1:42.48
2011	Vision in Gold	4	Joel Rosario	Ronald W. Ellis	Jay Em Ess Stable	1:41.55
2010	St Trinians	5	Joel Rosario	Mike R. Mitchell	Dan Capen/Laura Chavers	1:41.73
2009	Santa Teresita	5	Joe Talamo	Eric Guillot	Southern Equine Stable	1:41.88
2008	Double Trouble	5	Rafael Bejarano	Robert J. Frankel	Patricia Bozzano	1:42.46
2007	Sugar Shake	4	David Flores	Robert J. Frankel	Stronach Stables	1:43.89
2006	Star Parade	7	Martin Pedroza	Darrell Vienna	Gary A. Tanaka	1:42.31
2005	Miss Loren	7	Jose Valdivia, Jr.	Luis Seglin	Llers Corp.	1:42.42
2004	Star Parade	5	Victor Espinoza	Darrell Vienna	Gary A. Tanaka	1:43.87
2003	Starrer	5	Pat Valenzuela	John Shirreffs	George Krikorian	1:42.75
2002	Favorite Funtime	5	Gary Stevens	Bob Baffert	Golden Eagle Farm	1:44.15
2001	Lovellon	5	Gary Stevens	Ron McAnally	Gary A. Tanaka	1:43.37
2000	Manistique	5	Corey Nakatani	John Shirreffs	Marshall Naify	1:42.60
1999	India Divina	5	Garrett K. Gomez	Eduardo Inda	Barry K. Schwartz	1:42.71
1998	Exotic Wood	6	Chris McCarron	Ronald W. Ellis	Pam & Martin Wygod	1:40.95
1997	Jewel Princess	5	Corey Nakatani	Wallace Dollase	Stephen & Stephen /TC	1:41.72
1996	Serena's Song	4	Gary Stevens	D. Wayne Lukas	Robert & Beverly Lewis	1:42.21
1995	Queens Court Queen	6	Corey Nakatani	Ron McAnally	Alex G. Campbell, Jr.	1:41.61
1994	Supah Gem	4	Corey Nakatani	Wallace Dollase	Perez & Stephen	1:48.83
1993	Race The Wild Wind	4	Kent Desormeaux	Ron McAnally	B. L. & M. Chase	1:41.27
1992	Paseana	5	Chris McCarron	Ron McAnally	Sidney H. Craig	1:41.94
1991	Little Brianne	6	Julio A. Garcia	Jack Van Berg	Robert Alick	1:41.60
1990	Bayakoa	6	Chris McCarron	Ron McAnally	M/M Frank Whitham	1:43.00
1989	Miss Brio	5	Eddie Delahoussaye	Neil D. Drysdale	William S. Farish III	1:41.00
1988	Mausie	6	Gary Stevens	Gary F. Jones	W. deBurgh & Lima	1:43.60
1987	Fran's Valentine	5	Pat Valenzuela	Joseph Manzi	Green Thumb Farm	1:42.60
1986	Love Smitten	5	Chris McCarron	Edwin J. Gregson	Gailyndel Farms	1:44.60
1985	Adored	5	Laffit Pincay, Jr.	Laz Barrera	Ethel D. Jacobs	1:42.40
1984	High Haven	5	Ray Sibille	Laz Barrera	R. R. Dodderidge	1:42.40
1984	Marisma	6	Laffit Pincay, Jr.	Lee Rossi	Carl J. Maggio	1:44.20
1983	Star Pastures	5	Bill Shoemaker	John Gosden	Robert E. Sangster	1:42.60
1983	Sangue	5	Laffit Pincay, Jr.	Henry M. Moreno	R. Charlene Parks	1:41.00
1982	Targa	5	Frank Olivares	Jack Van Berg	Hobby Horse Farms el al	1:42.00
1981	Glorious Song	5	Chris McCarron	John Cairns	N. B. Hunt & F. Stronach	1:43.20
1980	Kankam	5	Eddie Delahoussaye	D. Wayne Lukas	Melvin E. Hatley	1:41.80
1979	Grenzen	4	Laffit Pincay, Jr.	Loren Rettele	Delaplaine/Schaffer/Woolsey	1:47.20
1978	Swingtime	6	Fernando Toro	Charlie Whittingham	M. J. Bradley & Whittingham	1:41.40
1977	Hail Hilarious	4	Don Pierce	Neil D. Drysdale	Saron Stable	1:42.00
1976	Gay Style	6	Don Pierce	Charlie Whittingham	John Sikura, Jr.	1:41.40
1975	Gay Style	5	Bill Shoemaker	Charlie Whittingham	John Sikura, Jr.	1:42.00
1974	Convenience	6	Laffit Pincay, Jr.	Willard L. Proctor	Glen Hill Farm	1:42.80
1973	Susan's Girl	4	Laffit Pincay, Jr.	John W. Russell	Fred W. Hooper	1:42.00
1972	Turkish Trousers	4	Bill Shoemaker	Charlie Whittingham	Mrs. Howard B. Keck	1:41.20
1971	Last of the Line	4	Jerry Lambert	Joseph S. Dunn	William R. Hawn	1:41.60
1970	Gallant Bloom	4	John L. Rotz	William J. Hirsch	King Ranch	1:42.20
1969	Dark Mirage	4	Eddie Belmonte	Everett W. King	Lloyd I. Miller	1:43.00
1968	Gamely	4	Manuel Ycaza	James W. Maloney	William Haggin Perry	1:43.80
1967	Natashka	4	Bill Shoemaker	William A. Peterson	George F. Getty II	1:42.40
1966	Poona Queen	6	Manuel Ycaza	Gordon Campbell	M/M John J. Elmore	1:42.40
1965	Batteur	5	Fernando Alvarez	James W. Maloney	William Haggin Perry	1:42.80
1964	Curious Clover	4	Kenneth Church	Clyde Turk	Louis R. Rowan	1:43.20
1963	Linita	6	Manuel Ycaza	Clyde Turk	Corradini & Dorney	1:42.60
1962	Rose O'Neill	4	Ismael Valenzuela	Ted Saladin	M/M. Bert W. Martin	1:44.40
1961	Tritoma	5	Jack Leonard	J. M. Phillips	Connie M. Ring	1:43.20
1960	Silver Spoon	4	Eddie Arcaro	Robert L. Wheeler	C. V. Whitney	1:42.60
1959	Two Cent Stamp	4	George Taniguchi	Edward A. Neloy	Elmendorf	1:43.60
1958	Nooran	6	William Boland	Charlie Whittingham	Mrs. Leslie Fenton	1:42.80
1957	Kings Mistake	7	Bill Shoemaker	Tommy Doyle	M/M E. B. Johnston	1:46.00
1956	In Reserve	4	Johnny Longden	Vance Longden	Alberta Ranches, Ltd.	1:23.20
1955	Blue Butterfly	6	Johnny Longden	Vance Longden	Alberta Ranches, Ltd.	1:22.00
1954	Smart Barbara	4	Gordon Glisson	E. B. Johnston	E. B. Johnston	1:25.60
1953	Spanish Cream	5	Eric Guerin	Allen Drumheller	H. W. Collins Stable	1:38.20
1952	Special Touch	5	Eddie Arcaro	Allen Drumheller	J. N. Crofton	1:39.20
1948	1951	Race not held				
1947	On Trust	3	Ralph Neves	William Molter	E. O. Stice & Sons	1:37.40
1946	Honeymoon	3	Ted Atkinson	Graceton Philpot	Louis B. Mayer	1:37.40
1942	1945	Race not held				
1941	Phar Rong	2	Leon Haas	C. H. Jones	C. S. & C. J. Jones	1:34.80
1940	Augury	3	Lloyd Knapp	Ted D. Grimes	Neil S. McCarthy	1:14.40
1939	Porter's Mite	3	Basil James	Ted Horning	William E. Boeing	1:12.40
1938	Sun Egret	3	Alfred Shelhamer	H. Guy Bedwell	A. C. Compton	1:12.00
1937	Race not held					
1936	Papenie	3	Leon Haas	R. Rennick	J. Pepp	1:12.80
1935	Soon Over	4	Silvio Coucci	William Brennan	Greentree Stable	1:11.00
1934	Wise Daughter	3	Jack Westrope	Robert McGarvey	Milky Way Farm Stable	1:12.40
