= Adoration Stakes =

Horse race held in California, US

- Class: Discontinued
- Location: Santa Anita Park, Arcadia, California
- Inaugurated: 1952 (as Milady Handicap)
- Race type: Thoroughbred - Flat racing
- Website: www.santaanitapark.com

Race information
- Distance: 1 1/16 miles (8.5 furlongs)
- Surface: Dirt
- Track: Left-handed
- Qualification: Fillies & mares, three-years-old & up
- Weight: Allowance
- Purse: $100,000 (since 2014)

The Adoration Stakes is a discontinued American Thoroughbred horse race that was run annually during May at Santa Anita Park. The event was open to fillies and mares, age three and up, willing to race one and one-sixteenth miles on the dirt. The purse was $100,000. The event lost its Grade III classification and the last running of the event was in 2018.

== History ==
The race was founded in 1952 as the Milady Handicap at Hollywood Park Racetrack in Inglewood, California. Usually run on the dirt, the Milady was run on an all-weather artificial dirt surface from 2007 to 2013. The race was renamed as the Marjorie L. Everett Handicap in 2012 to honor Marjorie L. Everett, former chairman, president and CEO of Hollywood Park who died on March 23, 2012. When Hollywood Park was closed at the end of 2013, the race was moved to Santa Anita and renamed as the Adoration Stakes. The race was also changed from a handicap to allowance conditions, in which horses receive a specified reduction in weight if they satisfy certain conditions.

It was a Grade I race from 1987 through 2004, during which years it was won by several Hall of Fame inductees including Bayakoa, Paseana and Azeri. Zenyatta won the race in both 2008 and 2009 as part of her 19 race win streak. The Milady was a Grade II event from 1974 (when grading was introduced) to 1986 and from 2005 to 2013. In 2014, it was stepped down to a Grade III event.

The race has been run at a variety of distances:

- 1 1/16 miles – 1967–1969, 1973–1984, 1986 to present
- 1 mile – 1954, 1958–1966, 1970–1972, 1985
- 7 furlongs – 1952-1953
- 6 furlongs – 1955-1957

== Records ==
Speed Record:

- Image of Reality (1980) - 1:40 1/5

Most wins:

- 2 - A Gleam (1952, 1953)
- 2 - Adored (1984, 1985)
- 2 - Bayakoa (1989, 1990)
- 2 - Paseana (1992, 1993)
- 2 - Azeri (2002, 2003)
- 2 - Zenyatta (2008, 2009)
- 2 - Beholder (2015, 2016)

Most wins by a jockey:

- 6 – Chris McCarron (1992, 1993, 1994, 1996, 1998, 2000)

Most wins by a trainer:

- 6 - Ron McAnally (1989, 1990, 1991, 1992, 1993, 1997)

== Winners since 1989 ==
| Year | Winner | Age | Jockey | Trainer | Owner | Time |
|---|---|---|---|---|---|---|
| 2018 | Fault | 4 | Geovanni Franco | Philip D'Amato | Agave Racing Stable | 1:44.84 |
| 2017 | Vale Dori | 4 | Rafael Bejarano | Bob Baffert | Mohammed bin Khalifa Al Maktoum | 1:42.35 |
| 2016 | Beholder | 6 | Gary Stevens | Richard Mandella | Spendthrift Farm | 1:42.73 |
| 2015 | Beholder | 5 | Gary Stevens | Richard Mandella | Spendthrift Farm | 1:41.67 |
| 2014 | Let Faith Arise | 4 | Corey Nakatani | Jerry Hollendorfer | Tommy Town Thoroughbreds | 1:43.41 |
| 2013 | Open Water | 4 | Joe Talamo | Eric Guillot | Southern Equine, Smith & Whispering Oaks | 1:44.01 |
| 2012 | Include Me Out | 4 | Joe Talamo | Ronald W. Ellis | Jay Em Ess Stable | 1:44.15 |
| 2011 | Ultra Blend | 5 | David Flores | Art Sherman | Nels Erickson | 1:43.07 |
| 2010 | Made for Magic | 5 | Omar Berrio | A. C. Avila | L-Bo Racing/Michael Lamb | 1:43.48 |
| 2009 | Zenyatta | 5 | Mike E. Smith | John Shirreffs | Jerry and Ann Moss | 1:42.30 |
| 2008 | Zenyatta | 4 | Mike E. Smith | John Shirreffs | Jerry & Ann Moss | 1:41.17 |
| 2007 | Nashoba's Key | 4 | Joseph Talamo | Carla Gaines | Warren B. Williamson | 1:42.16 |
| 2006 | Proposed | 4 | Pat Valenzuela | John Shirreffs | Pam & Martin Wygod | 1:42.92 |
| 2005 | Andujar | 4 | Corey Nakatani | Doug O'Neill | J. Paul Reddam et al. | 1:41.59 |
| 2004 | Star Parade | 5 | Victor Espinoza | Darrell Vienna | Gary A. Tanaka | 1:41.83 |
| 2003 | Azeri | 5 | Mike E. Smith | Laura de Seroux | Allen E. Paulson Trust | 1:41.87 |
| 2002 | Azeri | 4 | Mike E. Smith | Laura de Seroux | Allen E. Paulson Trust | 1:42.02 |
| 2001 | Lazy Slusan | 6 | Victor Espinoza | John K. Dolan | Dolan & Longo | 1:42.25 |
| 2000 | Riboletta | 5 | Chris McCarron | Eduardo Inda | Aaron & Marie Jones | 1:42.01 |
| 1999 | Gourmet Girl | 4 | Ed Delahoussaye | Pico Perdomo | Gary A. Tanaka | 1:40.97 |
| 1998 | I Ain't Bluffing | 4 | Chris McCarron | Ronald W. Ellis | Jan, Mace & Samantha Siegel | 1:42.16 |
| 1997 | Listening | 4 | Alex Solis | Ron McAnally | Janis R. Whitham | 1:41.37 |
| 1996 | Twice The Vice | 5 | Chris McCarron | Ronald W. Ellis | Pam & Martin Wygod | 1:40.96 |
| 1995 | Pirates Revenge | 4 | Chris Antley | Ronald W. Ellis | Pam & Martin Wygod | 1:41.57 |
| 1994 | Andestine | 4 | Chris McCarron | David Hofmans | Raymond Rosen | 1:41.40 |
| 1993 | Paseana | 6 | Chris McCarron | Ron McAnally | Jenny & Sidney Craig | 1:41.60 |
| 1992 | Paseana | 5 | Chris McCarron | Ron McAnally | Jenny & Sidney Craig | 1:41.46 |
| 1991 | Brought To Mind | 4 | Pat Valenzuela | Ron McAnally | Tadahiro Hotehama | 1:41.70 |
| 1990 | Bayakoa | 6 | Laffit Pincay, Jr. | Ron McAnally | Janis & Frank Whitham | 1:41.20 |
| 1989 | Bayakoa | 5 | Laffit Pincay, Jr. | Ron McAnally | Janis & Frank Whitham | 1:42.00 |

== Earlier winners ==
- 1988 - By Land By Sea
- 1987 - Seldom Seen Sue
- 1986 - Dontstop Themusic
- 1985 - Adored
- 1984 - Adored
- 1983 - Marisma
- 1982 - Cat Girl
- 1981 - Save Wild Life
- 1980 - Image of Reality
- 1979 - Innuendo
- 1978 - Taisez Vou
- 1977 - Cascapedia
- 1976 - Bastonera
- 1975 - Modus Vivendi
- 1974 - Twixt
- 1973 - Minstrel Miss
- 1972 - Typecast
- 1971 - Opening Bid (DH)
- 1971 - Street Dancer (DH)
- 1970 - Everything Lovely
- 1969 - Desert Law
- 1968 - Princessnesian
- 1967 - Desert Trial
- 1966 - Fleet Treat
- 1965 - Savaii
- 1964 - Jalousie
- 1963 - Fortunate Isle
- 1962 - Linita
- 1961 - Mountain Glory
- 1960 - Silver Spoon
- 1959 - Honey's Gem
- 1958 - Born Rich
- 1957 - Coverit
- 1956 - Speedy Edie
- 1955 - Countess Fleet
- 1954 - Flitting Past
- 1953 - A Gleam
- 1952 - A Gleam
