= Santa Margarita Stakes =

- Class: Grade II
- Location: Santa Anita Park; Arcadia, California, United States
- Inaugurated: 1935
- Race type: Thoroughbred – Flat racing
- Website: Santa Anita Park

Race information
- Distance: 1 1/8 miles (9 furlongs)
- Surface: Dirt
- Track: Left-handed
- Qualification: Fillies and Mares, four years old & up
- Weight: Assigned
- Purse: US$200,000 (2023)

The Santa Margarita Stakes is an American Thoroughbred horse race run annually in early April at Santa Anita Park in Arcadia, California for fillies and mares age four and older, it is contested on dirt over a distance of one and one-eighths miles.

A Grade I event for most of its history, in 2019 it was downgraded to Grade II.

Inaugurated in 1935, the race was open to all horses age three and older until 1938 when it was restricted to fillies and mares.

Since inception, the Santa Margarita Handicap has been raced at various distances:

- 7 furlongs : 1935–1936
- 6 furlongs : 1937
- 8.5 furlongs (1 1/16 miles) 1938–1941, 1945–1948, 1953–1954.
- 9 furlongs (1 1/8 miles) : 1949–1952, 1955 present

There was no race from 1942 through 1944 as a result of World War II.

The Santa Margarita Handicap was run in two divisions in 1964. The first time it was run as an invitational event was in 1968.

== Records ==
Speed record: (at current distance of 1 1/8 miles)

- 1:47.00 – Lady's Secret (1986)

Most wins:

- 2 – Our Betters (1956, 1957)
- 2 – Curious Clover (1964, 1965)
- 2 – Tizna – (1974, 1975)
- 2 – Bayakoa (1989, 1990)
- 2 – Paseana (1992, 1994)
- 2 - Adare Manor (2023, 2024)

Most wins by a jockey:

- 6 – Bill Shoemaker (1951, 1952, 1954, 1966, 1972, 1979)
- 6 – Laffit Pincay Jr. (1967, 1971, 1973, 1981, 1982, 1989)
- 6 – Chris McCarron (1980, 1985, 1990, 1992, 1994, 1996)

Most wins by a trainer:

- 6 – Ron McAnally (1989, 1990, 1992, 1994, 1995, 1998)

Most wins by an owner:

- 3 – C. V. Whitney (1947, 1959, 1960)
- 3 – Ethel D. Jacobs (1961, 1966, 1984)
- 3 – William Haggin Perry (1964, 1968, 1969)

== Winners of the Santa Margarita Stakes since 1935 ==
Year	Winner	Age	Jockey	Trainer	Owner	Time
2026	Om N Joy	4	Kent Desormeaux	Aggie Ordonez	Baker Stables, LLC	1:50:37
2025	Seismic Beauty	4	Antonio Fresu	Bob Baffert	MyRacehorse	1:48.30
2024	Adare Manor	5	Juan Hernandez	Bob Baffert	Michael Lund Peterson	1:50.86
2023	Adare Manor	4	Juan Hernandez	Bob Baffert	Michael Lund Peterson	1:49.79
2022	Blue Stripe (ARG)	5	Tyler Base	Marcelo Polanco	Pozo de Luna	1:50.52
2021	As Time Goes By	4	Mike E. Smith	Bob Baffert	Tabor, Michael B., Magnier, Mrs. John, and Smith, Derrick	1:49.95
2019	Paradise Woods	5	Mike E. Smith	John A. Shirreffs	Steven Sarkowsky, Martin J. Wygod, and Pam Wygod	1:51.95
2018	Fault	4	Geovanni Franco	Philip D'Amato	Agave Racing Stable & Little Red Feather Racing	1:50.58
2017	Vale Dori	5	Rafael Bejarano	Bob Baffert	Sheikh Mohammad Bin Khalifa Al Maktoum	1:48.81
2016	Tara's Tango	4	Rafael Bejarano	Jerry Hollendorfer	Stonestreet Stables	1:50.44
2015	Warren's Veneda	5	Tyler Baze	Craig Anthony Lewis	Benjamin C. Warren	1:48.73
2014	Let Faith Arise	4	Corey Nakatani	Jerry Hollendorfer	Tommy Town Thoroughbreds	1:48.70
2013	Joyful Victory	5	Rosie Napravnik	J. Larry Jones	Fox Hill Farms	1:49.53
2012	Include Me Out	4	Joe Talamo	Ron Ellis	Jay Em Ess Stable	1:47.62
2011	Miss Match (ARG)	6	Garrett Gomez	Neil Drysdale	Matthew Cloros	1:47.33
2010	Zenyatta	6	Mike E. Smith	John Shirreffs	Jerry & Ann Moss	1:48.20
2009	Life Is Sweet	4	Garrett Gomez	John Shirreffs	Pam & Martin Wygod	1:48.71
2008	Nashoba's Key	5	Joe Talamo	Carla Gaines	Warren B. Williamson	1:48.82
2007	Balance	4	Victor Espinoza	David Hofmans	Amerman Racing	1:49.25
2006	Healthy Addiction	5	Jon Court	John W. Sadler	Pamela C. Ziebarth	1:48.18
2005	Tarlow	4	Pat Valenzuela	John Shirreffs	Ann & Jerry Moss	1:49.41
2004	Adoration	5	Mike E. Smith	David Hofmans	Amerman Racing	1:48.86
2003	Starrer	5	Pat Valenzuela	John Shirreffs	George Krikorian	1:48.20
2002	Azeri	4	Mike E. Smith	Laura de Seroux	Allen E. Paulson Trust	1:49.01
2001	Lazy Slusan	6	David Flores	John K. Dolan	Dolan & Longo	1:48.59
2000	Riboletta	5	Corey Nakatani	Eduardo Inda	Aaron & Marie Jones	1:50.40
1999	Manistique	4	Gary Stevens	John Shirreffs	505 Farms	1:48.31
1998	Toda Una Dama	5	Goncalino Almeida	Ron McAnally	Janis R. Whitham	1:48.87
1997	Jewel Princess	5	Corey Nakatani	Wallace Dollase	Stephen & Stephen / TTC	1:49.30
1996	Twice The Vice	5	Chris McCarron	Ronald W. Ellis	Pam & Martin Wygod	1:49.53
1995	Queens Court Queen	6	Corey Nakatani	Ron McAnally	Alex G. Campbell Jr.	1:48.81
1994	Paseana (ARG)	7	Chris McCarron	Ron McAnally	Sidney H. Craig	1:49.12
1993	Southern Truce	5	Corey Nakatani	Roger Stein	Regal Rose Stable	1:49.46
1992	Paseana (ARG)	5	Chris McCarron	Ron McAnally	Sidney H. Craig	1:47.48
1991	Little Brianne	6	Julio A. Garcia	Jack Van Berg	Robert Alick	1:48.40
1990	Bayakoa (ARG)	6	Chris McCarron	Ron McAnally	M/M Frank Whitham	1:48.40
1989	Bayakoa (ARG)	5	Laffit Pincay Jr.	Ron McAnally	M/M Frank Whitham	1:48.40
1988	Flying Julia	5	Frank Olivares	Donn Luby	James Marino	1:50.40
1987	North Sider	5	Ángel Cordero Jr.	D. Wayne Lukas	D. Wayne Lukas & Paul Paternostro	1:48.80
1986	Lady's Secret	4	Jorge Velásquez	D. Wayne Lukas	M/M Eugene Klein	1:47.00
1985	Lovlier Linda	5	Chris McCarron	Willard L. Proctor	William R. Hawn	1:48.00
1984	Adored	4	Fernando Toro	Laz Barrera	Ethel D. Jacobs	1:48.60
1983	Marimbula	5	Sandy Hawley	Michael Whittingham	Oak Cliff Stable	1:48.20
1982	Ack's Secret	6	Laffit Pincay Jr.	Michael Whittingham	Oak Cliff Stable	1:47.60
1981	Princess Karenda	4	Laffit Pincay Jr.	Gene Cleveland	Farish & Jones	1:47.20
1980	Glorious Song	4	Chris McCarron	Gerry Belanger	Nelson Bunker Hunt & Frank Stronach	1:48.40
1979	Sanedtki	5	Bill Shoemaker	Charlie Whittingham	Serge Fradkoff	1:47.80
1978	Taisez Vous	4	Don Pierce	Robert L. Wheeler	Vernon D. & Ann Eachus	1:49.00
1977	Lucie Manet	4	Darrel McHargue	Jaime Villagomez	Valpredo & Valpredo	1:48.40
1976	Fascinating Girl	4	Fernando Toro	Tommy Doyle	Golden Eagle Farm	1:49.40
1975	Tizna	6	Don Pierce	Henry M. Moreno	Nile Financial Corp.	1:48.60
1974	Tizna	5	Fernando Toro	Henry M. Moreno	Nile Financial Corp.	1:50.80
1973	Susan's Girl	4	Laffit Pincay Jr.	John W. Russell	Fred W. Hooper	1:47.80
1972	Turkish Trousers	4	Bill Shoemaker	Charlie Whittingham	Elizabeth A. Keck	1:47.80
1971	Manta	5	Laffit Pincay Jr.	Farrell W. Jones	Elmendorf	1:48.80
1970	Gallant Bloom	4	John L. Rotz	William J. Hirsch	King Ranch	1:50.60
1969	Princessnesian	5	Don Pierce	James W. Maloney	William Haggin Perry	1:53.00
1968	Gamely	4	Manuel Ycaza	James W. Maloney	William Haggin Perry	1:49.00
1967	Miss Moona	4	Laffit Pincay Jr.	Steve Ippolito	Jacnot Stable	1:50.20
1966	Straight Deal II	4	Bill Shoemaker	Hirsch Jacobs	Ethel D. Jacobs	1:48.60
1965	Curious Clover	5	Kenneth Church	Clyde Turk	Louis R. Rowan	1:49.60
1964	Curious Clover	4	Kenneth Church	Clyde Turk	Louis R. Rowan	1:48.80
1964	Batteur	4	Manuel Ycaza	James W. Maloney	William Haggin Perry	1:49.00
1963	Pixie Erin	4	Peter Moreno	Joseph S. Dunn	Howard B. Keck	1:54.20
1962	Queen America	6	George Taniguchi	Clyde Turk	Beaty & Dorney	1:49.40
1961	Sister Antoine	4	William Harmatz	Hirsch Jacobs	Ethel D. Jacobs	1:49.60
1960	Silver Spoon	4	Eddie Arcaro	Robert L. Wheeler	C. V. Whitney	1:48.80
1959	Bug Brush	4	Angel Valenzuela	Robert L. Wheeler	C. V. Whitney	1:48.20
1958	Born Rich	5	Manuel Ycaza	Carl A. Roles	Poltex Stable	1:50.60
1957	Our Betters	5	Johnny Longden	William Molter	C. H. Jones & Sons	1:49.00
1956	Our Betters	4	Eddie Arcaro	William Molter	C. H. Jones & Sons	1:49.20
1955	Blue Butterfly	6	Johnny Longden	Vance Longden	Alberta Ranches, Ltd.	1:48.60
1954	Cerise Reine	4	Bill Shoemaker	Noble Threewitt	Ada L. Rice	1:47.00
1953	Spanish Cream	5	Eric Guerin	Allen Drumheller	H. W. Collins Stable	1:44.80
1952	Bed O' Roses	5	Bill Shoemaker	William C. Winfrey	Alfred G. Vanderbilt II	1:51.40
1951	Special Touch	4	Bill Shoemaker	Allen Drumheller	James N. Crofton	1:48.60
1950	Two Lea	4	Steve Brooks	Horace A. Jones	Calumet Farm	1:52.80
1949	Lurline B.	4	Walter Litzenberg	Darrell Cannon	Elobee Farm	1:53.00
1948	Miss Doreen	6	Johnny Longden	Hurst Philpot	Charles S. Howard	1:46.00
1947	Monsoon	5	Ralph Neves	Lydell T. Ruff	C. V. Whitney	1:43.00
1946	Canina	5	Johnny Longden	Bob R. Roberts	Aaron Hirschberg	1:43.40
1945	Busher	3	Johnny Longden	George M. Odom	Louis B. Mayer	1:43.00
1941	Omelet	5	Jack Westrope	George Adams	Vegas Stock Farm	1:47.20
1940	Fairy Chant	3	Douglas Dodson	Richard E. Handlen	William duPont Jr.	1:46.80
1939	Flying Lee	4	Sam Renick	Duval A. Headley	Hal Price Headley	1:47.20
1938	Primulus	5	Lester Balaski	Thomas Griffin	Frank Smith	1:49.00
1937	Stand Pat	6	Willie Saunders	Frank Gilpin	Edward F. Seagram	1:13.00
1936	Singing Wood	5	Robert Jones	William J. Norton	Liz Whitney	1:23.00
1935	Ted Clark	5	Clyde Turk	Charles A. Marone	C. N. Mooney	1:26.40
