= Clement L. Hirsch Stakes =

Horse race in California, US

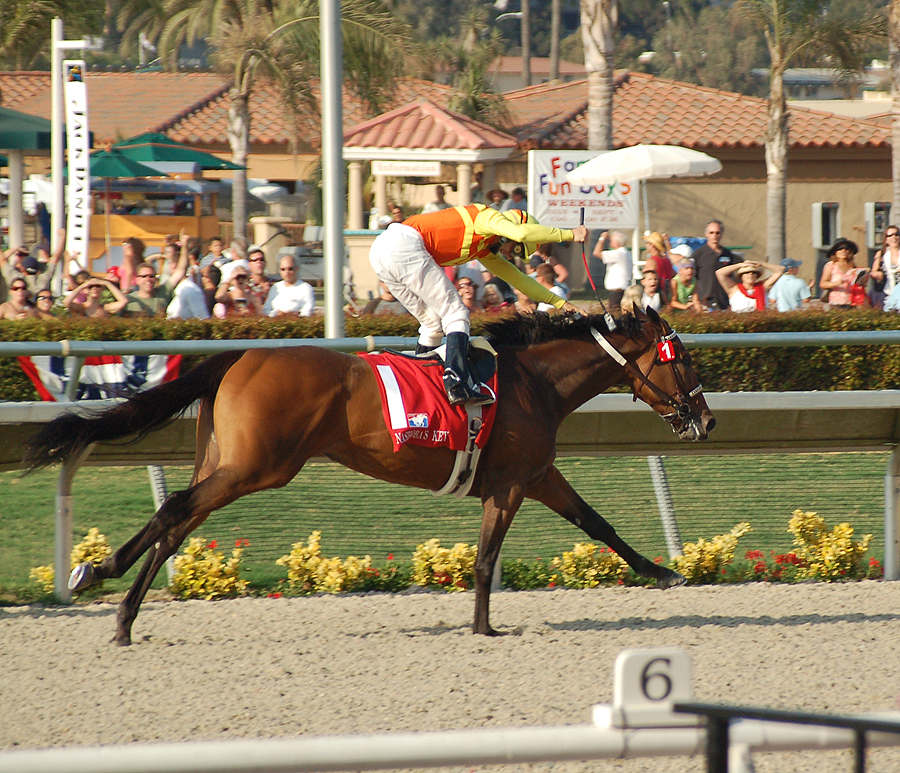
- Rider Joseph Talamo on horse Nashoba's Key at the event in 2005.
- Class: Grade I
- Location: Del Mar Racetrack; Del Mar, California, United States
- Inaugurated: 1937 (as Chula Vista Handicap)
- Race type: Thoroughbred – flat racing
- Website: Del Mar

Race information
- Distance: 1 1/16 miles
- Surface: Dirt
- Track: left-handed
- Qualification: Fillies and mares, three-years-old and older
- Weight: Base weights with allowances: 4-year-olds and up: 125 lbs. 3-year-olds: 121 lbs.
- Purse: $400,000 (2022)

The Clement L. Hirsch Stakes is a Grade I American Thoroughbred horse race for fillies and mares age three years and older over a distance of one and one-sixteenth miles on the dirt track, scheduled annually in late July or early August at Del Mar Racetrack in Del Mar, California. The event currently carries a purse of $400,000.

== History ==
The event was inaugurated as the Chula Vista Handicap on July 17, 1937, as a five and one-half furlong race for two-year-olds bred in California and was won by High Strike owned by singer Bing Crosby. The event was held again until 1967 when it was run at a distance of one mile.

In 1973, the race was brought back permanently as a contest for horses aged three and older at a distance of 1 1/8 miles on the turf. During the next few years there would be more distance changes. It was run at 1 1/8 miles in 1973, 1 mile in 1974–1975, and seven and one-half furlongs from 1976–1980, after which it was set at its current distance of 1 1/16 miles.

In 1981 the event was moved to the dirt and the events conditions changed to the current restriction of fillies and mares that are three-years-old and older. Since then it has been run on the dirt except from 2007 to 2014 when Del Mar used a synthetic "all weather" surface.

In 2000 it was renamed to honor Clement L. Hirsch (1914–2000), a Thoroughbred owner whose horse, Magical Maiden won this race in 1993. A Newport Beach, California businessman, Hirsch was responsible for the creation of the Oak Tree Racing Association.

The race was run in two divisions in 1977 and again in 1980.

The event was classified as Grade III in 1983, upgraded to Grade II in 1986 and a Grade I event in 2009. At the same time, conditions for the event changed from a handicap to a stakes format.

In the 1980s when this event became a fillies and mares race it started to attract high calibre performers that would confirm the status of the event. Starting in 1984 with the winner Princess Rooney who later that year would win the Breeders' Cup Distaff and be crowned US Champion Older Dirt Female Horse. The 1990 winner, the Argentine bred mare Bayakoa would rectify her unplaced finish from 1989 and would also win the Breeders' Cup Distaff for the second time and retain her position as US Champion Older Dirt Female Horse. Allen E. Paulson's two-time winner of the event, Azeri would become US Horse of the Year in 2002. Zenyatta proved her dominance in this event winning it three times and with that she continued on winning the 2009 Breeders' Cup Classic and in 2010 becoming US Horse of the Year.

== Records ==
Speed record:

- 1 1/16 miles: 1:40.00 – Matching (1982) (new stakes and track record)

Speed record:

- 7 lengths – Beholder (2015)

Most wins:

- 3 – Zenyatta (2008, 2009, 2010)

Most wins by a jockey:

- 7 – Chris McCarron (1981, 1988, 1994, 1995, 1996, 1997, 2000)

Most wins by a trainer:

- 5 – John W. Sadler (2006, 2014, 2016, 2017, 2019)

Most wins by an owner:

- 3 – Sidney Craig (1992, 1994, 1996)
- 3 – Jerry and Ann Moss (2008, 2009, 2010)
- 3 – Hronis Racing (2014, 2016, 2017)

== Winners ==
Year	Winner	Age	Jockey	Trainer	Owner	Distance	Time	Purse	Grade	Ref
Clement L. Hirsch Stakes
2026	Eunomia	4	Micah J. Husbands	Saffie A. Joseph, Jr.	St. Elias Stables LLC and WSS Racing, LLC	1 1/16 miles	1:44.10	$402,000	I	
2025	Seismic Beauty	4	Juan J. Hernandez	Bob Baffert	MyRacehorse & Peter Leidel	1 1/16 miles	1:42.33	$400,500	I	
2024	Adare Manor	5	Juan J. Hernandez	Bob Baffert	Michael Lund Petersen	1 1/16 miles	1:43.29	$401,500	I	
2023	Adare Manor	4	Juan J. Hernandez	Bob Baffert	Michael Lund Petersen	1 1/16 miles	1:43.33	$400,000	I	
2022	Blue Stripe (ARG)	5	Hector I. Berrios	Marcelo Polanco	Pozo de Luna	1 1/16 miles	1:42.97	$400,000	I	
2021	Shedaresthedevil	4	Florent Geroux	Brad Cox	Flurry Racing Stables, Qatar Racing and Big Aut Farms	1 1/16 miles	1:45.38	$300,000	I	
2020	Fighting Mad	4	Abel Cedillo	Bob Baffert	Gary L. & Mary E. West	1 1/16 miles	1:43.46	$250,500	I	
2019	Ollie's Candy	4	Kent J. Desormeaux	John W. Sadler	Paul & Karen Eggert	1 1/16 miles	1:44.66	$300,351	I	
2018	Unique Bella	4	Mike E. Smith	Jerry Hollendorfer	Don Alberto Stable	1 1/16 miles	1:44:40	$300,000	I	
2017	Stellar Wind	5	Victor Espinoza	John W. Sadler	Hronis Racing	1 1/16 miles	1:43.92	$300,000	I	
2016	Stellar Wind	4	Victor Espinoza	John W. Sadler	Hronis Racing	1 1/16 miles	1:41.24	$300,000	I	
2015	Beholder	5	Gary L. Stevens	Richard E. Mandella	Spendthrift Farm	1 1/16 miles	1:43.81	$300,750	I	
2014	Iotapa	4	Joseph Talamo	John W. Sadler	Hronis Racing	1 1/16 miles	1:43.04	$300,250	I	
2013	Lady of Fifty	4	Corey Nakatani	Jerry Hollendorfer	Jerry Hollendorfer & George Todaro	1 1/16 miles	1:42.96	$301,000	I	
2012	Include Me Out	3	Joseph Talamo	Ronald W. Ellis	Jay Em Ess Stable	1 1/16 miles	1:41.96	$300,000	I	
2011	Ultra Blend	5	Tyler Baze	Art Sherman	Nels J. Erickson	1 1/16 miles	1:42.28	$300,000	I	
2010	Zenyatta	6	Mike E. Smith	John Shirreffs	Jerry & Ann Moss	1 1/16 miles	1:45.03	$300,000	I	
2009	Zenyatta	5	Mike E. Smith	John Shirreffs	Jerry & Ann Moss	1 1/16 miles	1:43.24	$300,000	I	
Clement L. Hirsch Handicap
2008	Zenyatta	4	Mike E. Smith	John Shirreffs	Jerry & Ann Moss	1 1/16 miles	1:41.48	$300,000	II	
2007	Nashoba's Key	4	Joseph Talamo	Carla Gaines	Warren B. Williamson	1 1/16 miles	1:48.29	$300,000	II	
2006	Healthy Addiction	5	Victor Espinoza	John W. Sadler	Pamela C. Ziebarth	1 1/16 miles	1:42.92	$294,000	II	
2005	Tucked Away	5	Alex O. Solis	Patrick Gallagher	Nico Nierenberg	1 1/16 miles	1:42.82	$300,000	II	
2004	Miss Loren (ARG)	6	Jon Court	Luis E. Seglin	Llers Corporation	1 1/16 miles	1:42.93	$300,000	II	
2003	Azeri	5	Mike E. Smith	Laura de Seroux	A. E. Paulson Trust	1 1/16 miles	1:42.12	$300,000	II	
2002	Azeri	4	Mike E. Smith	Laura de Seroux	A. E. Paulson Trust	1 1/16 miles	1:42.66	$300,000	II	
2001	Tranquility Lake	6	Eddie Delahoussaye	Julio C. Canani	Pam & Martin Wygod	1 1/16 miles	1:41.78	$294,000	II	
2000	Riboletta (BRZ)	5	Chris McCarron	Eduardo Inda	Aaron U. & Marie Jones	1 1/16 miles	1:42.06	$300,000	II	
Chula Vista Handicap
1999	A Lady From Dixie	4	Chris Antley	D. Wayne Lukas	Robert D. & Marilyn Randal	1 1/16 miles	1:43.40	$300,000	II	
1998	Sharp Cat	4	Corey Nakatani	Wallace Dollase	The Thoroughbred Corp.	1 1/16 miles	1:42.00	$294,000	II	
1997	Radu Cool	5	Chris McCarron	John Shirreffs	505 Farms	1 1/16 miles	1:42.60	$300,000	II	
1996	Different (ARG)	4	Chris McCarron	Ron McAnally	Sidney Craig	1 1/16 miles	1:42.40	$303,200	II	
1995	Borodislew	5	Chris McCarron	Eduardo Inda	505 Farms	1 1/16 miles	1:41.80	$313,100	II	
1994	§ Paseana (ARG)	7	Chris McCarron	Ron McAnally	Sidney Craig	1 1/16 miles	1:40.40	$202,100	II	
1993	Magical Maiden	4	Gary L. Stevens	Warren Stute	Clement L. Hirsch	1 1/16 miles	1:42.60	$213,600	II	
1992	Exchange	4	Laffit Pincay Jr.	William Spawr	Sidney Craig	1 1/16 miles	1:42.00	$213,100	II	
1991	Vieille Vigne (FR)	4	Martin A. Pedroza	Jude T. Feld	Fry & Gasen	1 1/16 miles	1:42.60	$210,300	II	
1990	Bayakoa (ARG)	6	Laffit Pincay Jr.	Ron McAnally	Frank & Janis Whitham	1 1/16 miles	1:40.60	$156,000	II	
1989	Goodbye Halo	4	Corey Black	Charles E. Whittingham	Alex Campbell Jr. & Arthur B. Hancock III	1 1/16 miles	1:41.80	$133,400	II	
1988	Clabber Girl	5	Chris McCarron	D. Wayne Lukas	John A. Nerud	1 1/16 miles	1:41.60	$131,600	II	
1987	Infinidad (CHI)	5	Corey Black	Charles E. Whittingham	Arthur B. Hancock III	1 1/16 miles	1:41.40	$106,650	II	
1986	Fran's Valentine	4	Bill Shoemaker	Joseph Manzi	Green Thumb Farm	1 1/16 miles	1:41.40	$100,000	II	
1985	Dontstop Themusic	5	Darrel G. McHargue	Randy Winick	Albert R. & Dana N. Broccoli	1 1/16 miles	1:41.80	$79,775	III	
1984	Princess Rooney	4	Pat Valenzuela	Neil D. Drysdale	Paula J. Tucker	1 1/16 miles	1:40.40	$105,350	III	
1983	§ Sangue (IRE)	5	Bill Shoemaker	Henry M. Moreno	R. Charlene Parks	1 1/16 miles	1:42.20	$80,350	III	
1982	Matching	4	Ray Sibille	Steven L. Morguelan	Glencrest Farm & Steven L. Morguelan	1 1/16 miles	1:40.00	$79,600		
1981	Save Wild Life	4	Chris McCarron	Howard M. Tesher	H. Joseph Allen	1 1/16 miles	1:41.60	$81,400		
1980	Wayside Station	5	Pat Valenzuela	Edwin J. Gregson	Harris Farms	7 1/2 furlongs	1:28.80	$32,875		Division 1
1980	Galaxy Libra (IRE)	4	Bill Shoemaker	Charles E. Whittingham	L. Rowan (Lessee)	7 1/2 furlongs	1:29.00	$32,875		Division 2
1979	He's Dewan	4	Darrel G. McHargue	Jerry M. Fanning	Dan J. Agnew	7 1/2 furlongs	1:29.00	$39,600		
1978	Nantequos	5	Darrel G. McHargue	Ron McAnally	Mr. & Mrs. Albert Katz	7 1/2 furlongs	1:29.40	$33,750		
1977	Notably Different	5	Chuck Baltazar	Jay M. Robbins	Arthur, Parsons & Robbins	7 1/2 furlongs	1:29.20	$22,375		Division 1
1977	Authorization	4	Darrel G. McHargue	Willard L. Proctor	Glen Hill Farm	7 1/2 furlongs	1:29.40	$22,175		Division 2
1976	Uniformity	4	Rudy Campas	Willard L. Proctor	Glen Hill Farm	7 1/2 furlongs	1:28.20	$28,150		
1975	Bahia Key	5	Wayne Harris	Robert K. Mitchell	Robert K. Mitchell & Gil Wiener	1 mile	1:34.00	$21,750		
1974	Bahia Key	4	Álvaro Pineda	Robert K. Mitchell	Robert K. Mitchell & Gil Wiener	1 mile	1:34.20	$22,650		
1973	Grotonian	4	Bill Shoemaker	Charlie Whittingham	Marjorie L. Everett	1 1/8 miles	1:50.60	$21,600		
1968–1972		Race not held								
1967	Daystar II (ARG)	5	Bill Hartack	Farrell W. Jones	Mr. & Mrs. Hastings Harcourt	1 mile	1:35.20	$16,550		
1938–1966		Race not held								
1937	High Strike	2	Tim Sena	Albert M. Johnson	Bing Crosby	5 1/2 furlongs	1:06.00	$1,145	† Restricted	

Legend:
Dirt All Weather Track Turf
Notes:
§ Ran as an entry
† In the 1937 the event was restricted to two year olds bred in California

== See also ==
- List of American and Canadian Graded races
