= Zenyatta Stakes =

- Class: Grade II
- Location: Santa Anita Park; Arcadia, California, United States
- Inaugurated: 1993 (as Lady's Secret Handicap)
- Race type: Thoroughbred - Flat racing
- Website: Santa Anita

Race information
- Distance: 1 1/16 miles
- Surface: Dirt
- Track: Left-handed
- Qualification: Fillies & Mares, three-years-old and older
- Weight: Base weights with allowances: 4-year-olds and up: 126 lbs. 3-year-olds: 122 lbs.
- Purse: $200,000 (2020)
- Bonuses: Breeders' Cup "Win and You're In" - Breeders' Cup Distaff

The Zenyatta Stakes is a Grade II American Thoroughbred horse race for fillies and mares, age three and older the distance of one and one-sixteenth miles on the dirt scheduled annually in September at Santa Anita Park in Arcadia, California. The event currently carries a purse of $200,000.

== History ==
The event was inaugurated on 11 October 1993 as the Lady's Secret Handicap, named after Hall of Famer Lady's Secret who had won the 1986 Breeders' Cup Distaff at Santa Anita Park. The race was won by the odds-on favorite Hollywood Wildcat who was ridden by US Hall of Fame jockey Eddie Delahoussaye in a time of 1:41.05. In her following start Hollywood Wildcat won the Breeders' Cup Distaff at Santa Anita Park. The following year Hollywood Wildcat repeated her victory leading all the way to a comfortable 2 1/4 length margin.

After two runnings of the event was classified by the American Graded Stakes Committee as Grade III and was upgraded to Grade II status in 1996. In 2007 the event was upgraded to Grade I.

After the 2009 running, it was announced that the race would be renamed the Zenyatta Stakes, on the assumption that Zenyatta (who had won the race in 2008 and 2009) would retire at the end of 2009. That change, however, was held off for 2010 at the behest of the mare's connections. For 2010, it was again run as the Lady's Secret Stakes because Zenyatta was in the field, winning the race for the third time. The race was again run as the Lady's Secret Stakes in 2011 but was then run under its new name in 2012.

Beholder was able to equal Zenyatta's record of winning the event three times in 2015. After winning the 2012 Breeders' Cup Juvenile Fillies at Santa Anita, Beholder won this event as a three-year-old before winning the Breeders' Cup Distaff which also was held at Santa Anita. After winning this event in 2014 and 2015 Beholder did not enter the Breeder's Cup. In the 2016 running of the event, Beholder ran for the fourth time and was beaten by a nose by Stellar Wind, however she turned the tables winning the Breeders' Cup Distaff for a second time in her last career start.

In 2019 the event was downgraded to Grade II.

== Records ==
Speed record:

- 1:40.30 - Zenyatta (2008)

Margins:

- 5 1/4 lengths – Adare Manor (2023)

Most wins:

- 3 - Zenyatta (2008, 2009, 2010)
- 3 - Beholder (2013, 2014, 2015)

Most wins by a jockey:

- 5 - Mike E. Smith (2002, 2008, 2009, 2010, 2014)

Most wins by a trainer:

- 7 - Bob Baffert (1998, 2007, 2018, 2021, 2022, 2023, 2025)

Most wins by an owner:

- 4 - Ann & Jerry Moss (2008, 2009, 2010, 2011)

== Winners ==
Year	Winner	Age	Jockey	Trainer	Owner	Distance	Time	Purse	Grade	Ref
At Santa Anita Park – Zenyatta Stakes
2026	Super Corredora	3	Joel Rosario	John W. Sadler	Spartan Equine Racing LLC, West Point Thoroughbreds, Gardiner, Robert C. and Olszewski, Michael W.	1 1/16 miles	1:42.93	$200,000	II	
2025	Cavalieri	4	Juan J. Hernandez	Bob Baffert	Speedway Stables	1 1/16 miles	1:42.64	$200,000	II	
2024	Sugar Fish	4	Tyler Baze	Jeff Mullins	Sweetwater Stable & Talla Racing	1 1/16 miles	1:43.53	$200,000	II	
2023	Adare Manor	4	Juan Hernandez	Bob Baffert	Michael Lund Petersen	1 1/16 miles	1:43.70	$196,000	II	
2022	Midnight Memories	3	Ramon Vazquez	Bob Baffert	Karl Watson, Michael E. Pegram & Paul Weitman	1 1/16 miles	1:45.07	$200,000	II	
2021	Private Mission	3	Flavien Prat	Bob Baffert	Baoma Corporation	1 1/16 miles	1:43.77	$201,500	II	
2020	Harvest Moon	5	Flavien Prat	Simon Callaghan	Alice Bamford & Michael Tabor	1 1/16 miles	1:43.03	$196,000	II	
2019	Paradise Woods	5	Abel Cedillo	John Shirreffs	HS Stable & Martin J. & Pam Wygod	1 1/16 miles	1:44.31	$200,351	II	
2018	Vale Dori (ARG)	6	Joseph Talamo	Bob Baffert	Sheikh Mohammed bin Khalifa al Maktoum	1 1/16 miles	1:44.88	$300,345	I	
2017	Paradise Woods	3	Flavien Prat	Richard E. Mandella	Steven Sarkowsky & Martin J. & Pam Wygod	1 1/16 miles	1:44.34	$294,000	I	
2016	Stellar Wind	4	Victor Espinoza	John W. Sadler	Hronis Racing	1 1/16 miles	1:41.80	$300,000	I	
2015	Beholder	5	Gary L. Stevens	Richard E. Mandella	Spendthrift Farm	1 1/16 miles	1:42.83	$300,750	I	
2014	Beholder	4	Mike E. Smith	Richard E. Mandella	Spendthrift Farm	1 1/16 miles	1:42.19	$300,000	I	
2013	Beholder	3	Gary L. Stevens	Richard E. Mandella	Spendthrift Farm	1 1/16 miles	1:42.11	$250,500	I	
2012	Love and Pride	4	Martin Garcia	Todd A. Pletcher	Green Hills Farm	1 1/16 miles	1:43.09	$250,000	I	
Lady's Secret Stakes
2011	Zazu	3	Joel Rosario	John W. Sadler	Ann & Jerry Moss	1 1/16 miles	1:41.59	$250,000	I	
At Hollywood Park – Lady's Secret Stakes
2010	Zenyatta	6	Mike E. Smith	John Shirreffs	Ann & Jerry Moss	1 1/16 miles	1:42.97	$250,000	I	
At Santa Anita Park
2009	Zenyatta	5	Mike E. Smith	John Shirreffs	Ann & Jerry Moss	1 1/16 miles	1:42.89	$299,000	I	
2008	Zenyatta	4	Mike E. Smith	John Shirreffs	Ann & Jerry Moss	1 1/16 miles	1:40.30	$245,000	I	
2007	Tough Tiz's Sis	3	Victor Espinoza	Bob Baffert	Watson & Weitman Performances	1 1/16 miles	1:41.64	$196,500	I	
Lady's Secret Breeders' Cup Handicap
2006	Healthy Addiction	5	Victor Espinoza	John W. Sadler	Pamela C. Ziebarth	1 1/16 miles	1:43.60	$233,500	II	
2005	Healthy Addiction	4	Garrett K. Gomez	John W. Sadler	Pamela C. Ziebarth	1 1/16 miles	1:43.23	$235,000	II	
2004	§ Island Fashion	4	Kerwin John	Marcelo Polanco	Everest Stables	1 1/16 miles	1:43.43	$235,000	II	
2003	Got Koko	4	Alex O. Solis	Bruce Headley	Aase Headley & Paul Leung	1 1/16 miles	1:42.92	$300,000	II	
2002	Azeri	4	Mike E. Smith	Laura de Seroux	Allen E. Paulson Trust	1 1/16 miles	1:41.10	$217,500	II	
2001	Queenie Belle	4	Brice Blanc	Ben D. A. Cecil	Gary Seidler	1 1/16 miles	1:43.64	$209,400	II	
2000	Smooth Player	4	Eddie Delahoussaye	Dan L. Hendricks	John Spohler & Martin J. Wygod	1 1/16 miles	1:42.27	$204,600	II	
1999	Manistique	4	Corey Nakatani	John Shirreffs	505 Farms	1 1/16 miles	1:42.39	$197,500	II	
1998	Magical Allure	3	David R. Flores	Bob Baffert	Golden Eagle Farm	1 1/16 miles	1:42.55	$173,800	II	
1997	Sharp Cat	3	Alex O. Solis	D. Wayne Lukas	The Thoroughbred Corporation	1 1/16 miles	1:41.45	$179,400	II	
1996	Top Rung	5	Earlie Fires	Willard L. Proctor	Glen Hill Farm	1 1/16 miles	1:41.84	$178,450	II	
Lady's Secret Handicap
1995	Borodislew	5	Gary L. Stevens	Eduardo Inda	505 Farms	1 1/16 miles	1:41.61	$130,250	III	
1994	Hollywood Wildcat	4	Eddie Delahoussaye	Neil D. Drysdale	Irving & Marjorie Cowan	1 1/16 miles	1:40.61	$106,400		
1993	Hollywood Wildcat	3	Eddie Delahoussaye	Neil D. Drysdale	Irving & Marjorie Cowan	1 1/16 miles	1:41.05	$106,700		

Legend:
All Weather Track Dirt
Notes: § Ran as an entry

== See also ==
List of American and Canadian Graded races
