= Hawthorne Handicap =

- Class: Discontinued Grade 3 stakes
- Location: Hollywood Park Racetrack; Inglewood, California
- Inaugurated: 1974
- Race type: Thoroughbred - Flat racing

Race information
- Distance: 1-1/16 miles (8.5 furlongs)
- Track: Cushion Track, left-handed
- Qualification: Fillies & Mares, 3-years-old & up
- Weight: Assigned
- Purse: $100,000

The Hawthorne Handicap was an American Thoroughbred horse race run annually in May from 1974 thru 2008 at Hollywood Park Racetrack in Inglewood, California. The race was open to fillies and mares age three and older and regularly drew from the West Coast's top female runners.

The Hawthorne Handicap was raced on three different surfaces.

- 1973-1974: dirt
- 1976-1980: turf
- 1981-2006: dirt
- 2007-2008: all weather dirt composite track

== Historical notes ==
The inaugural running of the Hawthorne Handicap took place on May 25, 1974 and was won by Tallahto. Owned by Elizabeth Keck and bred by her husband Howard, Tallahto would win eight stakes races for her owner of which three were Grade 1 events and two were Grade 2 stakes.

In 2001, Hall of Fame jockey Chris McCarron won his fifth consecutive edition of the Hawthorne Handicap aboard Printemps. That feat tied McCarron with the Hollywood Park record for most consecutive wins of a single race set in the Los Angeles Handicap in 1974 by Don Pierce.

Hall of Fame jockeys Laffit Pincay Jr. and Chris McCarron each won the Hawthorne Handicap eight times. Their combined total of sixteen wins equals half of all the Hawthorne Handicap editions ever run.

In 1989 and 1990 Bayakoa won back-to-back editions of the Hawthorne. Both times, she would go on to win the Breeders' Cup Distaff and be voted the Eclipse Award as the American Champion Older Female Horse.

The final edition of the Hawthorne Handicap took place on May 4, 2008 and was won by Tough Tiz's Sis owned by Karl Watson & Paul Weitman and ridden by Aaron Gryder.

== Records ==
Speed record:

- 1:32.80 @ 1 mile: Bayakoa (1989)
- 1:40.60 @ 1-1/16 miles on turf: Country Queen (1980)
- 1:41.84 @ 1-1/16 miles on dirt: Tough Tiz's Sis (2008)

Most wins:

- Country Queen (1979, 1980)
- Adored (1984, 1985)
- Bayakoa (1989, 1990)

Most wins by a jockey:

- 8 - Laffit Pincay Jr. (1974, 1978, 1979, 1980, 1985, 1986, 1989, 1990)
- 8 - Chris McCarron (1981, 1987, 1995, 1997, 1998, 1999, 2000, 2001)

Most wins by a trainer:

- 6 - Ron McAnally (1989, 1990, 1991, 1995, 1999, 2001)

Most wins by an owner:

- 2 - Maribel G. Blum (1979, 1980)
- 2 - H. Joseph Allen (1981, 1982)
- 2 - Ethel D. Jacobs (Lessee) (1984, 1985)
- 2 - Frank & Janis Whitham (1989, 1990)
- 2 - Sidney & Jenny Craig (1995, 1999)

== Winners ==
Year	Winner	Age	Jockey	Trainer	Owner	Dist. (Miles)	Time	Purse $	Gr.
2008	Tough Tiz's Sis	4	Aaron Gryder	Bob Baffert	Karl Watson & Paul Weitman	1-1/16 m	1:41.84	$100,000	G3
2007	River Savage	5	Omar Berrio	Antonio "A.C." Avila	L-Bo Racing (Shawn Turner et al.) & Monte Pyle	1-1/16 m	1:44.08	$100,000	G3
2006	Star Parade	7	Martin Pedroza	Darrell Vienna	Gary A. Tanaka	1-1/16 m	1:42.26	$100,000	G3
2005	Hollywood Story	4	Victor Espinoza	John Shirreffs	George Krikorian	1-1/16 m	1:42.42	$100,000	G3
2004	Summer Wind Dancer	4	Victor Espinoza	Jeff Mullins	Richard & Yvette Wira & Linda Vetter	1-1/16 m	1:41.56	$100,000	G3
2003	Keys To The Heart	4	Jose Valdivia Jr.	Beau Greely	Thomas Nichols	1-1/16 m	1:42.97	$100,000	G3
2002	Queen of Wilshire	6	Pat Valenzuela	Darrell Vienna	E. A. Ranches (Ernie & Lisa Auerbach)	1-1/16 m	1:43.16	$100,000	G3
2001	Printemps	4	Chris McCarron	Ron McAnally	Amerman Racing Stables (John & Jerry Amerman)	1-1/16 m	1:43.21	$150,000	G2
2000	Riboletta	5	Chris McCarron	Eduardo Inda	Aaron & Marie Jones	1-1/16 m	1:42.33	$150,000	G2
1999	Victory Stripes	5	Chris McCarron	Ron McAnally	Sidney & Jenny Craig	1-1/16 m	1:41.73	$150,000	G2
1998	I Ain't Bluffing	4	Chris McCarron	Ronald W. Ellis	Siegel family	1-1/16 m	1:41.49	$100,000	G2
1997	Twice The Vice	6	Chris McCarron	Ronald W. Ellis	Martin & Pam Wygod	1-1/16 m	1:42.72	$100,000	G2
1996	Borodislew	6	Corey Nakatani	John Shirreffs	505 Farms	1-1/16 m	1:41.28	$100,000	G2
1995	Paseana	8	Chris McCarron	Ron McAnally	Sidney & Jenny Craig	1-1/16 m	1:42.40	$100,000	G2
1994	Golden Klair	4	Kent Desormeaux	Darrell Vienna	No Problem Stable & Sido Stable	1-1/16 m	1:41.41	$100,000	G2
1993	Freedom Cry	5	Alex Solis	Gary F. Jones	Hi Card Ranch (Keith & Barbara Card)	1-1/16 m	1:41.12	$100,000	G2
1992	Sacramentada	6	Kent Desormeaux	Richard Mandella	Randall D. Hubbard	1-1/16 m	1:43.04	$100,000	G2
1991	Brought To Mind	4	Pat Valenzuela	Ron McAnally	Tadahiro Hotehama	1-1/16 m	1:41.50	$100,000	G2
1990	Bayakoa	6	Laffit Pincay Jr.	Ron McAnally	Frank & Janis Whitham	1 m	1:34.00	$100,000	G2
1989	Bayakoa	5	Laffit Pincay Jr.	Ron McAnally	Frank & Janis Whitham	1 m	1:32.80	$100,000	G2
1988	Integra	4	Gary Stevens	Henry M. Moreno	George Aubin (Lessee)	1 m	1:36.00	$75,000	G2
1987	Seldom Seen Sue	4	Chris McCarron	Gary F. Jones	Frederick & Howard Drakos	1 m	1:33.60	$75,000	G2
1986	Dontstop Themusic	6	Laffit Pincay Jr.	Randy Winick	Albert R. & Dana N. Broccoli	1 m	1:35.40	$75,000	G2
1985	Adored	5	Laffit Pincay Jr.	Laz Barrera	Ethel D. Jacobs (Lessee)	1 m	1:34.80	$75,000	G2
1984	Adored	4	Fernando Toro	Laz Barrera	Ethel D. Jacobs (Lessee)	1-1/16 m	1:41.80	$60,000	G2
1983	Marisma	5	Kenneth D. Black	Lee J. Rossi	Carl Joseph Maggio	1-1/16 m	1:44.80	$50,000	G2
1982	Weber City Miss	5	Sandy Hawley	Howard M. Tesher	H. Joseph Allen	1-1/16 m	1:42.40	$50,000	G3
1981	Save Wild Life	4	Chris McCarron	Howard M. Tesher	H. Joseph Allen	1-1/16 m	1:42.80	$60,000	L/R
1980	Country Queen	5	Laffit Pincay Jr.	Randy Winick	Maribel G. Blum & Gainesway Farm	1-1/16 m	1:40.60	$50,000	L/R
1979	Country Queen	4	Laffit Pincay Jr.	Randy Winick	Maribel G. Blum, George Sarant, Arnold N. Winick	1-1/16 m	1:41.20	$40,000	L/R
1978	Sensational	4	Laffit Pincay Jr.	Laz Barrera	Mill House Stable	1-1/16 m	1:41.80	$40,000	L/R
1977	Cascapedia	4	Sandy Hawley	Gordon C. Campbell	Bernard J. Ridder	1-1/16 m	1:40.80	$40,000	L/R
1976-1	Swingtime	4	Bill Shoemaker	Charles E. Whittingham	Mary Jones Bradley & Charles E. Whittingham	1-1/16 m	1:41.80	$30,000	L/R
1976-2	Mia Amore	4	Fernando Toro	Jaime Villagomez	John Valpredo	1-1/16 m	1:41.80	$30,000	L/R
1975	Tizna	6	Jerry Lambert	Henry M. Moreno	Nile Financial Corp. (Victor Zemborain)	7 f	1:20.60	$30,000	UGS
1974	Tallahto	4	Laffit Pincay Jr.	Charles E. Whittingham	Elizabeth A. Keck	7 f	1:20.70	$30,000	UGS
