= Sharp Cat =

American-bred Thoroughbred racehorse

- Sire: Storm Cat
- Grandsire: Storm Bird
- Dam: In Neon
- Damsire: Ack Ack
- Sex: mare
- Foaled: 1994
- Country: United States
- Colour: Bay
- Breeder: John A. Franks
- Owner: The Thoroughbred Corp.
- Trainer: 1) D. Wayne Lukas; 2) Wallace Dollase (1998)
- Record: 22: 15-3-0
- Earnings: US$2,032,575

Major wins
- Del Mar Debutante Stakes (1996); Hollywood Starlet Stakes (1996); Matron Stakes (1996); Acorn Stakes (1997); Bayakoa Handicap (1997, 1998); Hollywood Oaks (1997); Lady's Secret Stakes (1997); Las Virgenes Stakes (1997); Santa Anita Oaks (1997); Santa Ysabel Stakes (1997); Beldame Stakes (1998); Chula Vista Handicap (1998); Ruffian Handicap (1998)
- Last updated on April 12, 2010

Sharp Cat (1994–2008) was an American Thoroughbred racehorse who won fifteen of her twenty-two starts of which seven of her wins were Grade 1 events.

== Background ==
She was a daughter of the two-time leading sire in North America, Storm Cat, and out of Kentucky Broodmare of the Year, In Neon.

Sharp Cat was bred by John A. Franks, prepped by Kirkwood Stables, and sold for $900,000 at the 1996 Barretts March select juvenile sale to Saudi Arabia's Prince Ahmed bin Salman who raced her under his The Thoroughbred Corp. Sharp Cat was conditioned for racing from a base in California by future U.S. Racing Hall of Fame inductee D. Wayne Lukas who handled her in 1996 and 1997. Wally Dollase took over as her trainer in 1998.

== Racing career ==
In 1996, Sharp Cat won the Grades 1 Matron Stakes and Hollywood Starlet Stakes. She had three more Grade 1 wins at age three, capturing the 1997 Las Virgenes Stakes, Santa Anita Oaks, and Acorn Stakes. Among her other 1997 victories she won the mile and one sixteenth Santa Ysabel Stakes at Santa Anita Park while setting a new stakes record of 1:41.34 that still stands through 2010. On December 7, 1997, Sharp Cat won the Bayakoa Handicap in the first walkover in the history of Hollywood Park Racetrack. In a race that determined the winner of that year's American Champion Three-Year-Old Filly, she ran second to Ajina in the 1997 Breeders' Cup Distaff.

Racing as a four-year-old for trainer Wally Dollase, Sharp Cat won two more Grade 1 races, the Ruffian Handicap and, in a race in which she earned an exceptional 119 Beyer Speed Figure, the Beldame Stakes. Undefeated that year, Sharp Cat was sent to Churchill Downs for the November 1998 Breeders' Cup Distaff as the pre-race favorite but did not compete after suffering a nearly fatal case of cramping that sent her into shock.

== Stud record ==
Prince Ahmed bin Salman died in 2002, and the following year his estate sold Sharp Cat to Darley Stud while she was in foal to Gone West. Sharp Cat was bred to top runners Point Given, Fusaichi Pegasus, Gone West, Seeking the Gold, and Cherokee Run without producing a significant runner. On April 21, 2008, at the Hagyard Equine Medical Institute in Lexington, Kentucky, she was humanely euthanized as a result of birthing complications after delivering a foal by A.P. Indy.
