= John Shirreffs =

American Thoroughbred racehorse trainer (1945–2026)

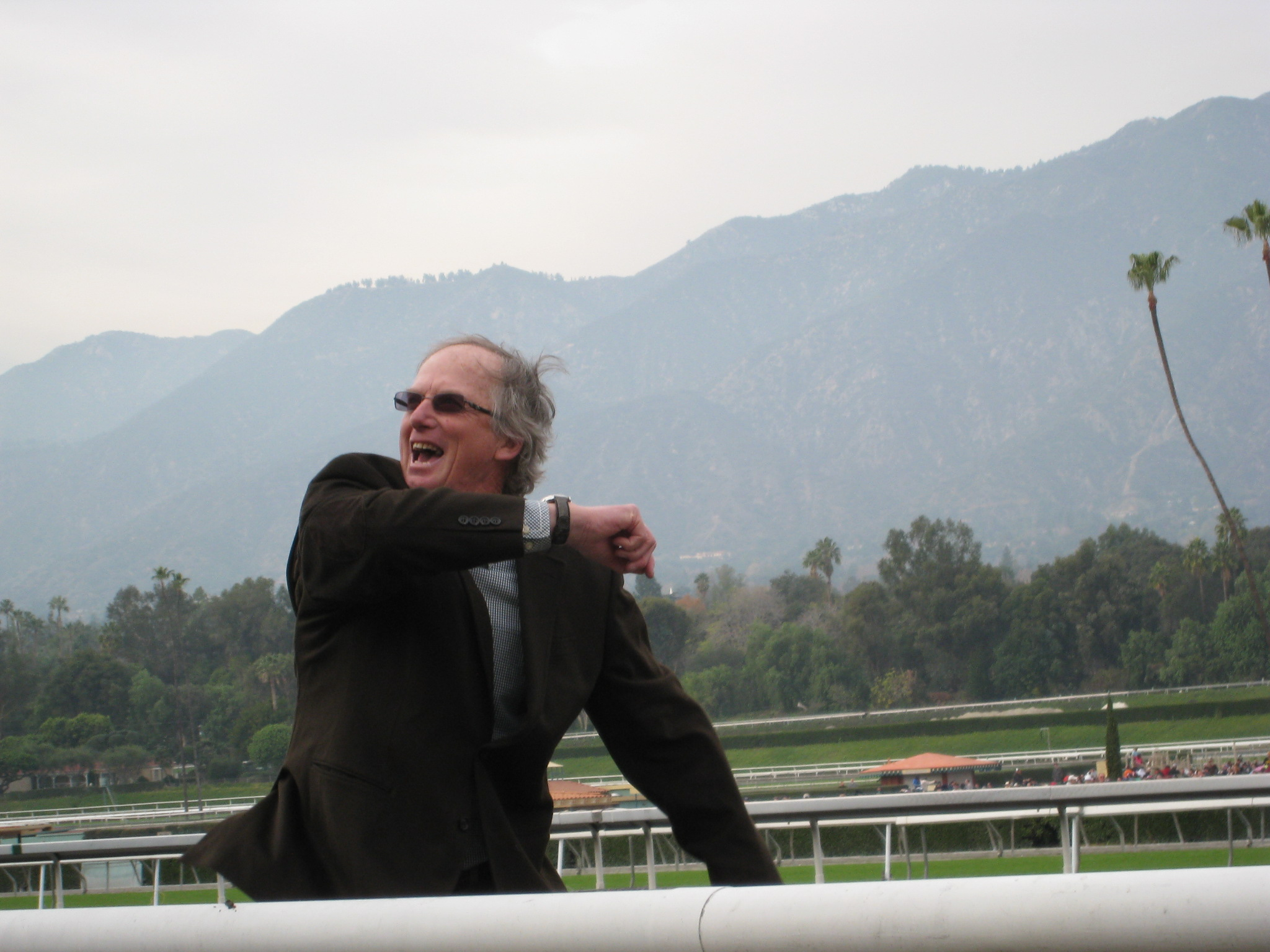
- Shirreffs in 2009

Personal information
- Born: June 1, 1945 Fort Leavenworth, Kansas, U.S.
- Died: February 12, 2026 (aged 80) Arcadia, California, U.S.
- Occupation: Trainer

Horse racing career
- Sport: Horse racing
- Career wins: 596

Major racing wins
- Goodwood Handicap (1994, 2007); Hawthorne Handicap (1996, 2005); Bayakoa Handicap (1998, 1999, 2002, 2004, 2009); Hollywood Oaks (1998); El Encino Stakes (1999, 2006, 2008, 2009); La Cañada Stakes (1999, 2005, 2009); Santa Margarita Handicap (1999, 2003, 2005, 2009, 2010); Santa Maria Handicap (2000, 2003); San Luis Rey Handicap (2005); Clement L. Hirsch Stakes (1997, 2008, 2009, 2010); San Diego Handicap (2006); San Felipe Stakes (2006); Milady Handicap (2006, 2008, 2009); Vanity Handicap (2006, 2008, 2009, 2010); Santa Anita Derby (2007); Inglewood Handicap (2007, 2009); Charles Whittingham Memorial Handicap (2007); Eddie Read Handicap (2007); Del Mar Handicap (2007); Oaklawn Handicap (2008); Apple Blossom Handicap (2008, 2010); Lady's Secret Stakes (2008, 2009, 2010); San Pasqual Handicap (2010); New Orleans Ladies Stakes (2010); American Oaks (2010, 2011); Matriarch Stakes (2011); Arcadia Handicap (2012); Pennsylvania Derby (2025) American Classics wins: Kentucky Derby (2005) Breeders' Cup wins: Breeders' Cup Ladies' Classic (2008, 2009); Breeders' Cup Classic (2009)

Racing awards
- Big Sport of Turfdom (2009)

Honors
- U.S. Racing Hall of Fame (2026)

Significant horses
- A.P. Warrior, Baeza, Bertrando, Giacomo, Gormley, Life Is Sweet, Manistique, Scenic Blast, Starrer, Tiago, Zardana, Zenyatta
- Updated on April 24, 2026

John Alexander Shirreffs (June 1, 1945 – February 12, 2026) was an American Thoroughbred racehorse trainer.

Based in California, Shirreffs began training Thoroughbreds in 1978. He won a number of stakes races with his most important coming in the 2005 Kentucky Derby when Giacomo scored a major upset. In 2007, another Shirreffs-trained horse scored a major upset when Tiago, a half-brother to Giacomo (both out of the mare Set Them Free) won the Santa Anita Derby. He was also the trainer of champion Zenyatta, beaten only once in twenty career starts, and winner of the Breeders' Cup Ladies' Classic in 2008 and Breeders' Cup Classic in 2009.

In November 2009, Shirreffs became the first trainer to conquer both the Ladies' Classic and Classic in the same year, as Life Is Sweet romped home in the former and Zenyatta defeated males in the latter.

Shirreffs grew up around horses at his family's farm. He served in the U.S. Marine Corps in Vietnam during the Vietnam War. Later he broke yearlings for Ed Nahem at Lakeview Thoroughbred farm. After that Shirreffs got his training license in 1978 and operated a small stable in Northern California. He was married to Dottie Ingordo.

Shirreffs died in his sleep at his home in Arcadia, California, on the morning of February 12, 2026, at the age of 80. He had 596 training victories from 3,589 career starts.

In 2026, Shirreffs was posthumously elected into the National Museum of Racing and Hall of Fame.

== Sources ==
- John Shirreffs at the NTRA
