= Bayakoa =

Argentine-bred Thoroughbred racehorse

- Sire: Consultants Bid
- Grandsire: Bold Bidder
- Dam: Arlucea (ARG)
- Damsire: Good Manners
- Sex: Mare
- Foaled: 1984
- Country: Argentina
- Color: Bay
- Breeder: Haras Principal
- Owner: Janis & Frank Whitham
- Trainer: Ron McAnally
- Record: 39: 21-9-0
- Earnings: $2,861,701

Major wins
- Gran Premio Palermo (1987); Santa Margarita Invitational Handicap (1989, 1990); Apple Blossom Handicap (1989); Hawthorne Handicap (1989, 1990); Milady Handicap (1989, 1990); Vanity Handicap (1989); Ruffian Handicap (1989); Spinster Stakes (1989, 1990); Santa Maria Handicap (1990); Chula Vista Handicap (1990) Breeders' Cup wins: Breeders' Cup Distaff (1989, 1990)

Awards
- American Champion Older Female Horse (1989, 1990)

Honors
- United States' Racing Hall of Fame (1998) #95 – Top 100 U.S. Racehorses of the 20th Century; Bayakoa Stakes at Los Alamitos Race Course; Bayakoa Stakes at Oaklawn Park
- Last updated on April, 2010

Bayakoa (October 10, 1984 – June 14, 1997) was a Thoroughbred Champion racehorse bred in Argentina. After racing successfully in that country, Bayakoa was sold to Janis and Frank Whitham and subsequently raced in the United States, mainly in California. In the course of her career, Bayakoa won 13 Grade I stakes races including back-to-back renewals of the Breeders' Cup Distaff. She was the American Champion Older Female Horse of both 1989 and 1990 and was subsequently inducted into the National Museum of Racing and Hall of Fame. In the Blood-Horse magazine List of the Top 100 Racehorses of the 20th Century, she was ranked 95th.

== Background ==
Bayakoa was a bay mare bred by Haras Principal in Argentina though many of her ancestors were from the United States. Her sire Consultant's Bid, exported to Argentina in 1982, was an American-bred son of champion Bold Bidder. Her dam Arlucea was a stakes winner in Argentina whose sire Good Manners was an American-bred son of champion Nashua. Arlucea's female line though had been in Argentina since the late 19th century.

Bayakoa was sold as an unraced two-year-old to Juan Carlos Viano. She was originally trained by O. L. Finarelli and was then transferred to the stable of Jorge Machado after her fourth race. During her three-year-old campaign, she was purchased by Frank and Janis Whitham for $300,000 and imported to the United States. Hall of Famer Ron McAnally was her trainer for the remainder of her career.

Bayakoa was known for racing with her tongue hanging out of the side of her parrot mouth, an equine overbite. Although her legs were not straight, she nonetheless proved durable, racing 39 times. Her high-strung nerves caused her "nearly to self-destruct on numerous occasions" but fueled her drive on the racecourse.

== Racing career ==
Bayakoa made her first start on February 15, 1987, finishing second, then won in her next start on April 10 by seven lengths. Stepped up in class to the Jorge de Atucha (ARG-I) on May 17, she was badly beaten. She followed this with an allowance race win on June 21, then finished off her two-year-old campaign with another loss in the Argentine 1000 Guineas (ARG-I).

Now age three, (Note: In the southern hemisphere, a Thoroughbred's official date of birth is August 1. When imported into the northern hemisphere, their official date of birth changes to January 1) Bayakoa ran second in the Polla de Potrancas (ARG-I) on August 23 on the dirt, then finished second in the Gran Premio San Isidro (ARG-I) on October 10 on the turf. On November 1, she won the prestigious Gran Premio Palermo (ARG-I) by twelve lengths, but had to be vanned off after the race because of heat prostration.

The win caught the eye of Ron McAnally, who purchased the filly for the Whitham's and imported her into the United States. She made her first start for her new connections in an allowance race on May 11, 1988, at Hollywood Park. Now considered a four-year-old, she won easily in a wire-to-wire performance. She raced six more times that year with one more win in the restricted June Darling Stakes.

=== 1989: Five-year-old campaign ===
Now ridden by Laffit Pincay Jr., Bayakoa won her first start of 1989, an allowance race at Santa Anita on January 5, by 12 lengths over a sloppy track. Stepping up to the Grade II Santa Maria Handicap on January 28, she broke through the starting gate and led for the first mile but was caught in the final strides to finish second. She returned on February 19 in the Grade I Santa Margarita Handicap. She broke poorly and veered to the outside but soon recovered and swept to the lead to win by two lengths over Goodbye Halo. It was her first graded stakes win in North America.

Bayakoa was then shipped to Oaklawn Park in Arkansas for the Grade I Apple Blossom Handicap on April 19. She raced wide for much of the race but still won by four lengths over Goodbye Halo. Returning to California, she won the Hawthorne Handicap on May 20 by 4 1/2 lengths, then the Milady Handicap on June 17 by 1 length. She extended her winning streak to five in the Vanity Handicap on July 15, winning by five lengths while carrying 125 pounds. She returned on September 2 in the Chula Vista Handicap at Del Mar, carrying 127 pounds. She was caught up in a fast early pace and faded to sixth.

Bayakoa was then shipped to Belmont Park in New York for the Ruffian Handicap on September 24, where she faced an excellent field including Open Mind, who had won 10 straight races including the New York fillies’ triple crown. After setting a slow early pace, Bayakoa won by 3 1/2 lengths. "This is a very nice filly," said Pincay. "I knew they were coming at me, but I had a lot of horse left." Open Mind's connections felt that they could have won if Bayakoa were not allowed to set a slow pace.

Bayakoa followed in the Spinster Stakes at Keeneland in Kentucky on October 15, winning by 11 1/2 lengths, the largest margin of victory in the history of the race. Her time of 1:47 4/5 for 1 1/8 miles was the second fastest in stakes history.

Bayakoa was the 7-10 favorite in the Breeders' Cup Distaff, held at Gulfstream Park in Florida on November 4. Her rivals included four horses trained by D. Wayne Lukas, three of whom were expected to "soften up" Bayakoa by challenging her for the early lead, allowing the fourth, Open Mind, to make a late challenge. Instead, Bayakoa settled in second place, then took command rounding the far turn and won by 1 1/2 lengths over Gorgeous with Open Mind a distant third.

Bayakoa finished the year with nine wins from eleven starts. Her seven Grade I wins included the Breeders' Cup Distaff and other major races across the country. In the Eclipse Award voting for champion older female horse, only one ballot was cast against her.

=== 1990: six-year-old campaign ===
Bayakoa started 1990 in the Santa Maria Handicap on February 4, winning by 3 1/2 lengths over Nikishka, who was carrying 9 pounds less weight. In the Santa Margarita Handicap on February 18, she won by six lengths while carrying 127 pounds, compared to Gorgeous, who was carrying 125 pounds. She was ridden in both races by Chris McCarron but then reunited with Lafitte Pincay for the rest of her career.

She was next entered against the best male horses on the West Coast in the Santa Anita Handicap on March 4. However, she broke poorly and was never in contention, finishing tenth. Returning to the distaff division in the Apple Blossom Handicap, she led for most of the race but was caught near the wire by Gorgeous, who was carrying four pounds less weight. Bayakoa next scores a four-length win in the Hawthorne Handicap and followed up with her second win of the Milady Handicap. Although she won easily, McNally was concerned that the handicap conditions of these races might catch up with Bayakoa. "That's the unfortunate part about hitting all these races. You win 'em all, you keep picking it up, then the big one comes along, and you're way up there."

As a result of the high weight assignments, her connections decided to skip the Vanity Handicap (in which she would have carried 128 pounds) and instead tried her against male horses in the San Diego Handicap where she carried 122 pounds. She could not hold off Quiet American, who carried 115 pounds. "It's a thrill to beat a horse like her,” said Quiet American's jockey Kent Desormeaux. "All you ever hear is Bayakoa. We beat the filly of the world."

In the Chula Vista Handicap on September 1, Bayakoa battled for almost the entire race with Fantastic Look, to whom she was conceding 14 pounds. In mid-stretch, Bayakoa looked beaten but she then rallied, winning by a nose in the final stride. "That was a tough one,” said McAnally. "I don't think she's ever had to run harder than that. That was an awful lot of weight to give away. It's a lot to ask; even a horse like her.

In the Spinster on October 6, she battled with old rival Gorgeous and won by three lengths while setting a stakes record. Coming into the 1990 Breeders' Cup Distaff at Belmont Park on October 27, Bayakoa had six wins from nine starts for the year, with two of those losses coming in open company against male horses. Despite her excellent record, she was the second choice behind three-year-old filly Go For Wand. Both front-runners, the two battled for the lead for the first mile. After they came off of the final turn and entered the last furlong, Go For Wand's leg shattered near the spot on the track where Ruffian is buried. Bayakoa continued on to the wire, and Go For Wand was euthanized. "I can hardly speak,” said McNally. "I feel good for our mare, but I feel terrible because of what happened to Go For Wand."

In the 1990 Eclipse Award voting, Bayakoa was again honored as the American champion older female horse.

== Retirement ==
Bayakoa raced three more times in 1991 at age seven, but her best finish was a second in the Santa Margarita Handicap. She finished her career with a record of 21 wins and 9 second-place finished from 39 starts, with earnings of $2,861,701.

Retired to broodmare duty, she produced four foals: Trinity Place (1992 filly by Strawberry Road), De Sarmiento (1993 colt by Seattle Slew), Morocha (1995 filly by Kris S.), and Arlucea (1997 filly by Broad Brush). Trinity Place, though unraced, went on to produce the multiple Grade I winner Affluent. Arlucea would later produce Fort Larned, winner of the 2012 Breeders' Cup Classic.

Not long after delivering Arlucea, Bayakoa developed laminitis (founder). The owner of Pennbrook Farm, where Bayakoa was boarded, explained, "We fought it for five weeks, but she had to be put down. She foundered in both front feet. We thought we were winning the battle, but you don't win many of these. It was not humane to keep going. We're very sorry." She was euthanized on June 14, 1997.

Bayakoa was inducted into the National Museum of Racing and Hall of Fame in 1998. She is ranked number 95 in Blood-Horse magazine's top 100 U.S. thoroughbred champions of the 20th Century.

== Pedigree ==
Pedigree of Bayakoa (ARG), mare, October 10, 1984
Sire Consultant's Bid 1977	Bold Bidder; 1962	Bold Ruler	Nasrullah
Sire Consultant's Bid 1977	Bold Bidder; 1962	Bold Ruler	Miss Disco
Sire Consultant's Bid 1977	Bold Bidder; 1962	High Bid	To Market
Sire Consultant's Bid 1977	Bold Bidder; 1962	High Bid	Stepping Stone
Sire Consultant's Bid 1977	Fleet Judy; 1963	Fleet Nasrullah	Nasrullah
Sire Consultant's Bid 1977	Fleet Judy; 1963	Fleet Nasrullah	Happy Go Fleet
Sire Consultant's Bid 1977	Fleet Judy; 1963	Solid Miss	Solidarity
Sire Consultant's Bid 1977	Fleet Judy; 1963	Solid Miss	Henpecker
Dam Arlucea (ARG) 1974	Good Manners; 1966	Nashua	Nasrullah
Dam Arlucea (ARG) 1974	Good Manners; 1966	Nashua	Segula
Dam Arlucea (ARG) 1974	Good Manners; 1966	Fun House	The Doge
Dam Arlucea (ARG) 1974	Good Manners; 1966	Fun House	Recess
Dam Arlucea (ARG) 1974	Izarra (ARG); 1964	Right of Way (GB)	Honeyway (GB)
Dam Arlucea (ARG) 1974	Izarra (ARG); 1964	Right of Way (GB)	Magnificent (GB)
Dam Arlucea (ARG) 1974	Izarra (ARG); 1964	Azpetia (ARG)	Corindon II (FR)
Dam Arlucea (ARG) 1974	Izarra (ARG); 1964	Azpetia (ARG)	Bidasoa (family: 9-g)

Bayakoa was inbred 4 × 4 × 4 to Nasrullah, meaning Nasrullah appears three times in the fourth generation of her pedigree.
