= Paseana =

Argentine-bred Thoroughbred racehorse

- Sire: Ahmad
- Grandsire: Good Manners (USA)
- Dam: Pasiflin
- Damsire: Flintham (IRE)
- Sex: Mare
- Foaled: August 23, 1987
- Country: Argentina
- Colour: Bay
- Breeder: Haras Vacacion
- Owner: Jenny & Sidney Craig
- Trainer: Ron McAnally
- Record: 36: 19-10-1
- Earnings: $3,317,427

Major wins
- Clasico Francisco J. Beazley (1990); Gran Premio Seleccion (1990); Gran Premio Enrique Acebal (1990); Silver Belles Handicap (1991); Santa Margarita Handicap (1992); Milady Handicap (1992, 1993); Apple Blossom Handicap (1992 & 1993); Vanity Handicap (1992); Santa Maria Handicap (1992, 1994); San Gorgonio Handicap (1992); Spinster Stakes (1993); Chula Vista Handicap (1994); Hawthorne Handicap (1995) Breeders' Cup wins: Breeders' Cup Distaff (1992)

Awards
- American Champion Older Female Horse (1992, 1993)

Honours
- United States Racing Hall of Fame (2001); Paseana Handicap at Santa Anita Park

Paseana (August 23, 1987 – June 21, 2006) was an Argentine-bred Thoroughbred racemare who competed very successfully in Argentina and in the United States, where she won 10 Grade 1 races. She received two Eclipse Awards and was also elected to the Racing Hall of Fame.

== Breeding ==
Paseana was sired by successful racehorse and sire Ahmad. Her dam, Pasiflin, was by Flintham (IRE), a Group winner and leading sire in South America. Paseana was linebred (4m x 5f) to the important sire Nasrullah and her sire's dam, Azyade, was inbred (2m x 4f) to Congreve.

== Racing record ==
Paseana won Grade 1 races in Argentina before being sold at age four to Americans Jenny & Sidney Craig, noted business personalities who founded the weight loss company Jenny Craig, Inc.

Based in California, future Hall of Fame inductee Ron McAnally took over Paseana's conditioning. In 1991, Paseana began a seven-race win streak, of which five were Grade I races.

After capturing the Grade I Santa Margarita Handicap in 1992, she ran second in that race in each of the next three years. In 1992, she was a supplementary entry in the Breeders' Cup Distaff at a cost of $200,000. Sent off by bettors as the second choice to Saratoga Dew, Paseana started from the difficult post position #14 at the far outside but won the most important race of her career by four lengths. Her 1992 performances earned her the Eclipse Award for American Champion Older Female Horse.

In 1993, the six-year-old mare won two more Grade I races, capturing the Apple Blossom Handicap and Spinster Stakes, then finished second by a nose to Hollywood Wildcat in the Breeders' Cup Distaff. Despite her loss in the Distaff, Paseana's 1993 performances earned her a second consecutive Eclipse Award for American Champion Older Female Horse.

Racing at ages seven and eight, Paseana won the 1994 Chula Vista Handicap and the 1995 Hawthorne Handicap. She was retired after her 1995 campaign having won nineteen races, of which ten were Grade I events, and was sent to Lane's End Farm in Versailles, Kentucky.

As a broodmare, she experienced fertility problems. In 1998, her owners sent her to Argentina. There, in 2000, she gave birth to her only foal, named Paseana's Girl.

On June 21, 2006, Paseana died at Haras San Ignacio de Loyola in Argentina following hemorrhaging due to a ruptured abdominal blood vessel.

In 2001, Paseana was inducted into the United States Racing Hall of Fame.

== See also ==
- List of leading Thoroughbred racehorses
