= Starrer =

American-bred Thoroughbred racehorse

- Sire: Dynaformer
- Grandsire: Roberto
- Dam: To the Hunt
- Damsire: Relaunch
- Sex: Filly
- Foaled: 1998
- Country: United States
- Color: Dark Bay
- Breeder: Wind Hill Farm (Howard & Kris Gibbons)
- Owner: George Krikorian
- Trainer: David Hofmans; John Shirreffs
- Record: 20: 6-5-3
- Earnings: US$1,043,033

Major wins
- Santa Paula Stakes (2001); Princess Stakes (2001); Bayakoa Handicap (2001, 2002); Santa Maria Handicap (2003); Santa Margarita Invitational (2003)

Starrer (foaled April 2, 1998 in Kentucky) is an American millionaire Thoroughbred racemare who was purchased as a yearling for $35,000 by George Krikorian, a Southern California movie theater mogul and member of the California Horse Racing Board.

Trained by David Hofmans throughout 2001, in the spring of 2002 Krikorian replaced him with John Shirreffs.

Starrer was retired from racing having won five graded stakes including the Grade 1 Santa Margarita Invitational and Santa Maria Handicaps.

== Pedigree ==
Pedigree of Starrer, dark bay mare, 1998
Sire Dynaformer	Roberto	Hail To Reason	Turn-To
Sire Dynaformer	Roberto	Hail To Reason	Nothirdchance
Sire Dynaformer	Roberto	Bramalea	Nashua
Sire Dynaformer	Roberto	Bramalea	Rarelea
Sire Dynaformer	Andover Way	His Majesty	Ribot
Sire Dynaformer	Andover Way	His Majesty	Flower Bowl
Sire Dynaformer	Andover Way	On the Trail	Olympia
Sire Dynaformer	Andover Way	On the Trail	Golden Trail
Dam To the Hunt	Relaunch	In Reality	Intentionally
Dam To the Hunt	Relaunch	In Reality	My Dear Girl
Dam To the Hunt	Relaunch	Foggy Note	The Axe
Dam To the Hunt	Relaunch	Foggy Note	Silver Song
Dam To the Hunt	Royal Advocator	Majestic Prince	Raise a Native
Dam To the Hunt	Royal Advocator	Majestic Prince	Gay Hostess
Dam To the Hunt	Royal Advocator	Precious Elaine	Advocator
Dam To the Hunt	Royal Advocator	Precious Elaine	Imgoinaway (family: 4-r)
