= Manistique (horse) =

American-bred Thoroughbred racehorse

- Sire: Unbridled
- Grandsire: Fappiano
- Dam: Astaire Step
- Damsire: Nureyev
- Sex: Mare
- Foaled: 1995
- Country: United States
- Colour: Dark Bay/Brown
- Breeder: 505 Farms
- Owner: 505 Farms
- Trainer: John Shirreffs
- Record: 15: 11-1-1
- Earnings: US$1,311,800

Major wins
- Hollywood Oaks (1998); Bayakoa Handicap (1998, 1999); El Encino Stakes (1999); Lady's Secret Breeders' Cup Handicap (1999); La Cañada Stakes (1999); Vanity Invitational Handicap (1999); Santa Margarita Invitational Handicap (1999); Santa Maria Handicap (2000)

Manistique (foaled 1995 in Kentucky) is an American Thoroughbred racehorse. Manistique won eleven races all in California.

== Background ==
Bred and raced by Marshall Naify's 505 Farms, she was an exceptionally large filly who stood close to seventeen hands. Thoroughbred Times reported that she was a "high-strung mare, whose excitability has been her undoing in three disappointing efforts out of state."

== Racing career ==
Conditioned for racing by John Shirreffs, Manistique debuted in 1998, winning her first three races at Hollywood Park Racetrack by a combined thirty-one lengths. She then was shipped to Saratoga Race Course in the New York state where her volatility caused her problems and she ran third to Banshee Breeze in the Alabama Stakes. In 1999, she won six important stakes including the Grade I Vanity Invitational and Santa Margarita Invitational Handicaps. Her temperamental problems and dislike of travel would be evident when, after a brilliant campaign in California, she finished last in the Breeders' Cup Distaff at Gulfstream Park in Florida then returned to Hollywood Park where soon after she won her second straight Bayakoa Handicap by three lengths.

In February 2000, the then five-year-old Manistique earned her third Grade I victory in the Santa Maria Handicap while carrying a career-high 125 pounds. It was to be her last race as she later injured herself during a workout and was retired.

== Broodmare ==
Owner Marshall Naify died on April 19, 2000, and his estate sold Manistique to Aaron and Marie Jones who sent her to serve as a broodmare at Taylor Made Farm near Nicholasville, Kentucky. Manistique suffered an "Early Fetal Loss" of her first foal as a result of the Mare Reproductive Loss Syndrome (MRLS) that plagued horse breeding farms in central Kentucky in 2001. She produced her first live foal in 2003 by Forestry. She has since foaled two by Storm Cat in 2004 and 2005. The latter, named Old Ninety Eight, is currently (2009) racing for Team Valor.
