= Azeri (horse) =

American Thoroughbred racehorse

- Sire: Jade Hunter
- Grandsire: Mr. Prospector
- Dam: Zodiac Miss
- Damsire: Ahonoora
- Sex: Mare
- Foaled: May 6, 1998
- Country: United States
- Colour: Chestnut
- Breeder: Allen E. Paulson
- Owner: Allen E. Paulson Living Trust
- Trainer: Laura de Seroux; D. Wayne Lukas
- Record: 24:17-4-0
- Earnings: $4,079,820

Major wins
- Clement L. Hirsch Handicap (2002, 2003); Lady's Secret Breeders' Cup Handicap (2002); Santa Margarita Invitational Handicap (2002); Apple Blossom Handicap (2002, 2003, 2004); Milady Breeders' Cup Handicap (2002, 2003); Vanity Handicap (2002, 2003); Go For Wand Handicap (2004); Spinster Stakes (2004) Breeders' Cup wins: Breeders' Cup Distaff (2002)

Awards
- American Horse of the Year (2002); American Champion Older Female Horse (2002, 2003, 2004)

Honours
- United States Racing Hall of Fame inductee (2010); Azeri Stakes at Oaklawn Park Race Track

Azeri (foaled May 6, 1998) is an American Hall of Fame champion thoroughbred racehorse who was 2002 US Horse of the Year and Champion Older Female from 2002 to 2004.

== Background ==
Azeri was foaled on May 6, 1998, in Versailles, Kentucky. She was bred and owned by Allen E. Paulson, who named her for an aviation checkpoint in Baku, Azerbaijan. She was sired by Jade Hunter (winner of the Grade 1 Donn Handicap and the G1 Gulfstream Park Handicap), who was a son of Mr. Prospector. Azeri is the only starter out of the Ahonoora mare Zodiac Miss, who was bred in Australia by John Messara's Arrowfield Stud. She is a descendant of the family of 1999 Breeders' Cup Mile winner Silic (FR). Australian bloodstock agents Brian King and James Bester (with California-based agent Denny Boultinghouse) recommended Zodiac Miss to Paulson, and the filly was shipped to US to race for her new owner. At the end of her racing career, Paulson sent Zodiac Miss to the breeding shed. Paulson was an aerospace magnate (Gulfstream Aerospace) whose global investments included racehorses, casinos, and oil exploration. He also bred and raced Cigar (Horse of the Year in 1995 and 1996), who ranks #2 on the North American all-time money-earners' list. Azeri was a buyback for $110,000 at the 1999 Keeneland September yearling sale from the consignment of Jonabell Farm.

== Racing career ==
Azeri was originally trained by Simon Bray before Allen Paulson's son Michael (whose father died in 2000) transferred her to trainer Laura de Seroux in August 2001. Of Azeri, Seroux said, "She didn't let anyone down, and she did it in great style. She's simply the fastest filly in the world now. You can't catch her early, and you can't catch her late." She won her first race (a six-furlong maiden race late in her three-year-old season) at Santa Anita on November 1, 2001, in the good time of 1:08.

=== Injury and trainer change ===
After an 11-race winning streak, Azeri suffered a tendon injury while going for her 12th straight win in the Lady's Secret Breeders' Cup Handicap at Santa Anita. She finished second, but the injury was career-threatening. Laura de Seroux recommended that she be retired, but Michael Paulson decided she could race again and turned her training over to Hall of Famer D. Wayne Lukas. In her first start for Lukas, six months after her injury, Azeri won an unprecedented third consecutive Apple Blossom Handicap. She then lost three races in a row, including the Metropolitan Mile, in which she raced against colts for the first time. Lukas entered her in the Go For Wand Handicap at Saratoga Race Course, where she faced multiple-Grade 1 winner Sightseek, beating that rival by two lengths.

Azeri was an early favorite for the 2004 Breeders' Cup Distaff, but her handlers entered her in the Breeders' Cup Classic, where she faced male horses for the second time. She finished fifth behind Ghostzapper.

Azeri was retired from racing in December 2004. In 24 starts, she won 17 races, finished second four times, and was unplaced three times. When Azeri was awarded the Eclipse Award for Horse of the Year, she was the third female to win since voting began in 1971 (the other two female winners of HOY were All Along in 1983 and Lady's Secret in 1986; both fillies defeated males in their HOY campaigns, but Azeri did not run against males until 2004). She was also named Champion Older Filly or Mare from 2002 to 2004.

In 2005, the Oaklawn Breeders' Cup Stakes at Arkansas's Oaklawn Park was renamed the Azeri Stakes in her honor.

== As a broodmare ==
Michael Paulson retired Azeri in December 2004. Azeri originally stood at Hill 'n' Dale Farms in Lexington, Kentucky, with other leading broodmares, including Silverbulletday and Better Than Honour (the dam of Belmont Stakes winners Jazil and Rags to Riches). In her first breeding season in 2005 she was barren to Storm Cat, but went on to produce three foals while at Hill 'n' Dale:

- Take Control, a colt by A.P. Indy, foaled February 14, 2007. Sold for $1.9 million as a 2 year old; winner in first two starts.
- Arienza, a filly by Giant's Causeway, foaled May 10, 2008. Winner, graded stakes placed.
- Wine Princess, a multiple graded stakes winning filly by Ghostzapper, foaled May 1, 2009.
  - Dam of graded stakes winner Smokin' T (by War Front)

In November 2009, Azeri was sold to Japan's Northern Farm for $2.25 million while in foal to Distorted Humor. She was retired from breeding in 2021 at age 23.

- Amelie, a filly by Distorted Humor, foaled May 17, 2010. Winner in Japan.
  - Dam of Japanese stakes winners Gandalf (by King Kamehameha) and Canal Saint Martin (Real Steel)
- Azerina Gakki, a colt by Zenno Rob Roy, foaled 2011. Unraced.
- Leukerbad, a colt by Deep Impact, foaled 2013. Sold for over $2.3 million as a weanling. Stakes winner, graded stakes placed in Japan.
- Admire Azeri, a colt by Deep Impact, foaled 2014. Sold for over $2.4 million as a weanling. Winner.
- Shirvanshah, a colt by Deep Impact, foaled 2015. Stakes winner, graded stakes placed.
- Gentiana, a filly by Deep Impact, foaled 2016. Winner. Retained by Northern Farm, her first foal is a 2-year-old of 2026.
- Ausangate, a colt by Deep Impact, foaled 2017. Sold for over $1.2 million as a yearling. Winner.
- An unraced filly by Heart's Cry, foaled 2018. Retained by Northern Farm as a broodmare, she is the dam of four foals, as of 2026.
- Maiden Tower, a filly by Drefong, foaled 2020. Winner.

Azeri was inducted into the National Museum of Racing and Hall of Fame in 2010. Azeri is one of only two female winners of the Eclipse Award for Horse of the Year to have produced foals by more than one stallion who was also Horse of the Year (A.P. Indy and Ghostzapper), the other mare being Lady's Secret, who produced foals by Seattle Slew and Skip Away.

== Race record ==
=== Age four (2002) ===
- 1st, Breeders' Cup Distaff (G1)
- 1st, Santa Margarita Invitational Handicap (G1)
- 1st, Apple Blossom Handicap (G1)
- 1st, Milady Breeders' Cup Handicap (G1)
- 1st, Vanity Handicap (G1)
- 1st, Clement L. Hirsch Handicap (G2)
- 1st, Lady's Secret Breeders' Cup Handicap (G2)
- 2nd, La Cañada Stakes (G2)

=== Age five (2003) ===
- 1st, Apple Blossom Handicap (G1)
- 1st, Milady BCH (G1)
- 1st, Vanity Handicap (G1)
- 1st, Clement L. Hirsch Handicap (G2)
- 2nd, Lady's Secret BCH (G2)

=== Age six (2004) ===
- 1st, Apple Blossom Handicap (G1)
- 1st, Go For Wand Handicap (G1)
- 1st, Spinster Stakes (G1)
- 2nd, Humana Distaff Handicap (G1)
- 2nd, Personal Ensign Handicap (G1)

== Awards and honors ==
- National Museum of Racing and Hall of Fame (2010)
- Eclipse Award for Horse of the Year (2002)
- Eclipse Award for Outstanding Older Female Horse (2002, 2003, 2004)
- Second-highest female money-earner in North America with $4,079,820 (first as of 2011 is Zenyatta with $6,404,580)
