= Joseph Talamo =

American jockey

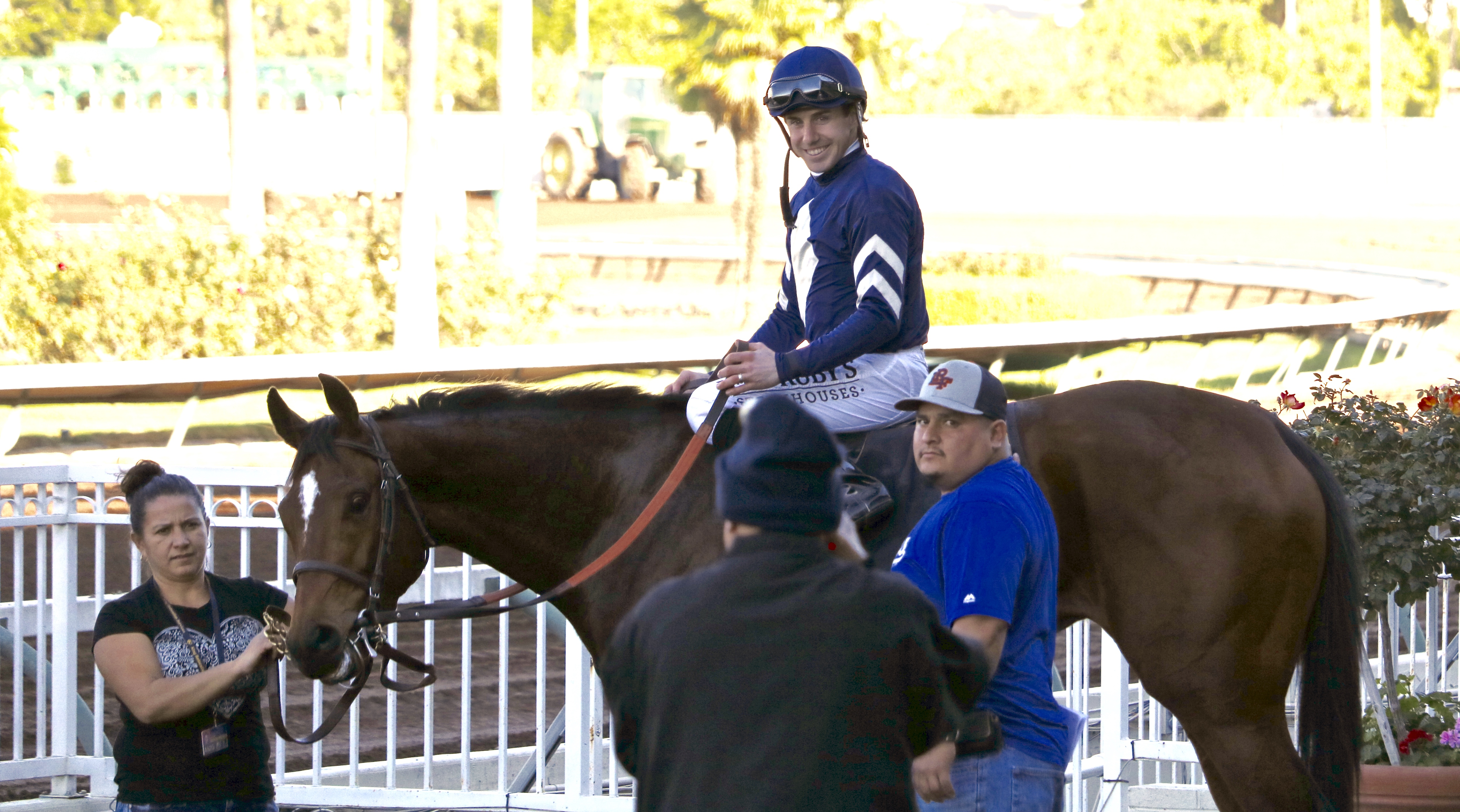
- Talamo in 2016

Personal information
- Born: January 12, 1990 (age 36) Marrero, Louisiana, United States
- Occupation: Jockey

Horse racing career
- Sport: Horse racing
- Career wins: 2,000 + (ongoing)

Major racing wins
- Grade 1 Wins; American Oaks Stakes (2011); Charles Whittingham Memorial Handicap (2011); Citation Handicap (2009); Clement L. Hirsch Memorial Turf Championship Stakes (2007); Clement L. Hirsch Stakes (2012, 2014); Frank E. Kilroe Mile Stakes (2013); Gold Cup at Santa Anita Stakes (2016); Santa Anita Derby (2010); Santa Anita Handicap (2016); Santa Margarita Invitational Stakes (2012); Santa Maria Handicap (2009); Shoemaker Mile Stakes (2013, 2014); Starlet Stakes (2011, 2016); Triple Bend Handicap (2007, 2012); Vanity Stakes (2007, 2014); Wood Memorial Stakes (2009); Yellow Ribbon Stakes (2007); Landaluce Stakes (2010, 2011); Royal North Stakes (2010); Zenyatta Stakes (2018) Breeders' Cup Wins; Breeders' Cup Turf Sprint (2009)

Racing awards
- United States Champion Apprentice Jockey (2007)

Significant horses
- Nashoba's Key, California Flag, Nownownow, I Want Revenge, Sidney's Candy, Caracortado

Joseph Talamo (born January 12, 1990) is an American jockey who competes in thoroughbred horse racing.

Born and raised in Marrero on the West Bank of the Mississippi River within the Greater New Orleans Metropolitan area, Joe Talamo was influenced by a father who worked in horse racing as an assistant trainer. At age eleven, he began riding horses and worked as a stable boy. Like many successful Cajun jockeys before him, Talamo first raced at a bush track. His skills and desire was such that he decided to leave high school in order to pursue a professional riding career. He debuted at Louisiana Downs in June 2006 and went on to become the first apprentice jockey to win a riding title at the Fair Grounds Race Course in New Orleans.

In April 2007, during his breakout year fresh off his riding title at the Fair Grounds, Talamo moved to live in Playa del Rey, California from where he competes primarily at racetracks in southern part of the state. He was the second leading jockey in wins during the Hollywood Park Racetrack 2007 Spring/Summer meet. For 2007, he notably earned five Grade I Graded stakes race wins and was voted the Eclipse Award as the 2007 United States Champion Apprentice Jockey.

Joe Talamo has been the regular rider on I Want Revenge who was the favorite to win the 2009 Kentucky Derby but the horse was scratched on the day of the race. He had said that if he wins the Derby, he is going to donate 25 percent of what he earns to the Children's Hospital of New Orleans that cares for all children, regardless of a family's ability to pay.

Talamo was one of the jockeys featured Animal Planet's 2009 reality documentary, Jockeys.

He was invited by the Hong Kong Jockey Club to participate in the Cathay Pacific International Jockey Championship in December 2009.

He rode atop Sidney's Candy in the 2010 Kentucky Derby. The horse finished in 17th place out of the money.

He also jockeyed atop Attachment Rate in the 2020 Kentucky Derby.

== Year-end charts in the United States ==
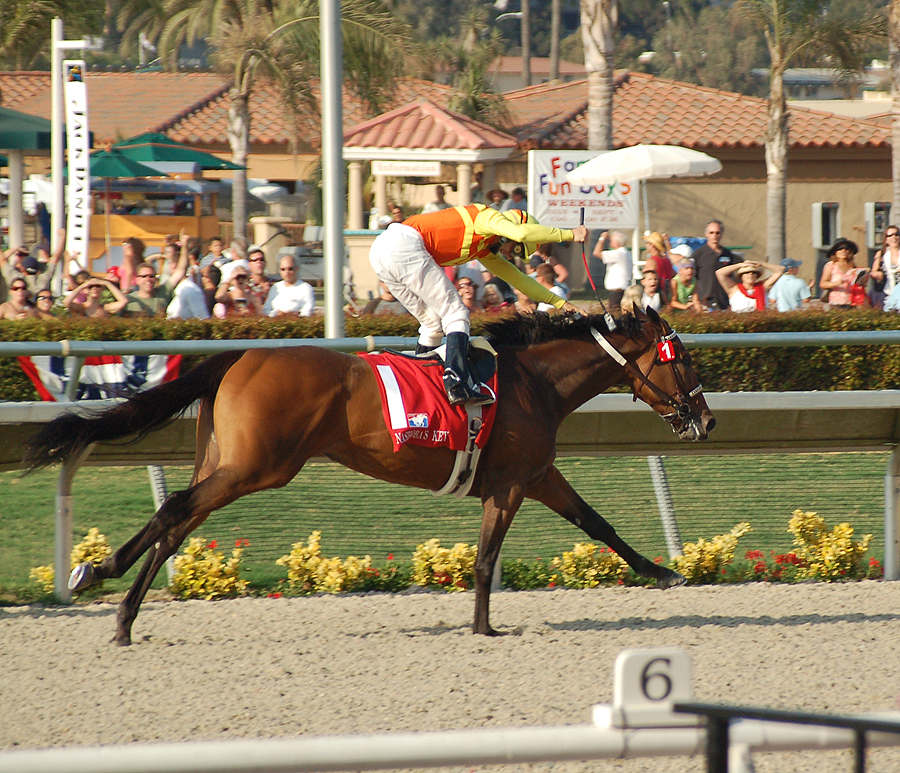
Joe Talamo aboard Nashoba's Key after winning the 2007 Clement L. Hirsch Handicap

Chart (2007–present)	Rank by earnings
National Earnings List for Jockeys 2007	14
National Earnings List for Jockeys 2008	36
National Earnings List for Jockeys 2009	19
National Earnings List for Jockeys 2010	22
National Earnings List for Jockeys 2011	12
National Earnings List for Jockeys 2012	9
National Earnings List for Jockeys 2013	15
National Earnings List for Jockeys 2014	12
National Earnings List for Jockeys 2015	28
National Earnings List for Jockeys 2016	29
National Earnings List for Jockeys 2017	34
National Earnings List for Jockeys 2018	32
National Earnings List for Jockeys 2019	41
National Earnings List for Jockeys 2020	16
National Earnings List for Jockeys 2021	28
