= California Cup Mile =

The California Cup Mile is an American thoroughbred horse race run annually at Santa Anita Park in Arcadia, California during its Oak Tree Racing Association meet in the fall of the year. Raced on turf over a distance of one mile, it is open to horses three-year-olds and up of either gender who were bred in the state of California. The event currently offers a purse of $175,000 and a trophy.

The California Cup Mile is part of the "California Cup Day" series of races intended to call attention to, and to honor, the California Thoroughbred racing and breeding industry.

== Past winners ==
- 2008 - Swift Winds (Alonso Quinonez)
- 2007 - Unusual Suspect
- 2006 - Epic Power
- 2005 - Drake's Victory
- 2004 - A To The Z
- 2003 - Lennyfromalibu
- 2002 - Turkish Prize
- 2001 - Native Desert
- 2000 - Road To Slew
- 1999 - Native Desert
- 1998 - Indiahoma
- 1997 - Gastown
- 1996 - Half Mamoon
- 1995 - Megan's Interco
- 1994 - Blaze O'Brien
- 1993 - Megan's Interco
- 1992 - Blaze O'Brien
- 1991 - Shirkee
- 1990 - Gum
