= California Cup Distaff =

The California Cup Distaff is an American thoroughbred horse race run annually at Santa Anita Park in Arcadia, California during its Oak Tree Racing Association meet in the fall of the year. as a downhill turf event over a distance of six and one-half furlongs on the grass and is open to fillies and mares three-years-old and up bred in the state of California. The event currently offers a purse of $150,000 and a trophy.

The California Cup Distaff is part of the "California Cup Day" series of races intended to call attention to, and to honor, the California Thoroughbred racing and breeding industry.

== Past winners ==
- 2011 - Unzip Me
- 2010 -
- 2009 -
- 2008 - Lightmyfirebaby
- 2007 - Gentle Charmer (Kyle Kaenel)
- 2006 - River's Prayer
- 2005 - Tempting Date
- 2004 - Our Mango
- 2003 - Blind Ambition
- 2002 - Lil Sister Stich
- 2001 - Jeweled Pirate
- 2000 - Chichim
- 1999 - Chichim
- 1998 - Bountiful Dreamer
- 1997 - Seattle Carla
- 1996 - Cat's Cradle
- 1995 - Klassy Kim
- 1994 - Nannetta
- 1993 - Miss L Attack
- 1992 - Bel's Starlet
- 1991 - Bel's Starlet
- 1990 - Linda Card
