= David Hofmans =

American horse trainer (1943–2024)

Personal information
- Born: January 27, 1943 Los Angeles, California, U.S.
- Died: July 3, 2024 (aged 81)
- Occupation: Trainer

Horse racing career
- Sport: Horse racing
- Career wins: 1,085

Major racing wins
- Hollywood Derby (1994); Molson Million (1994); Acorn Stakes (1995); Del Mar Breeders' Cup Mile (1995, 1996); Landaluce Stakes (1995); San Marcos Stakes (1995); Pat O'Brien Handicap (1996); San Antonio Handicap (1996); San Pasqual Handicap (1996); Santa Paula Stakes (1996, 2001); Jim Dandy Stakes (1997); Lexington Stakes (1997); San Carlos Handicap (1997); San Fernando Breeders' Cup Stakes (1997); Haskell Invitational Handicap (1997); Del Mar Debutante Stakes (2000); Blue Grass Stakes (2001); Hollywood Futurity (2001); Lane's End Breeders' Futurity (2001); Hollywood Breeders' Cup Oaks (2002); Arlington Matron Handicap (2004); Santa Margarita Handicap (2004); Bing Crosby Handicap (2005); Las Virgenes Stakes (2006); Del Mar Futurity (2010) Canadian Triple Crown wins: Queen's Plate (1997) U.S. Triple Crown series: Belmont Stakes (1997) Breeders' Cup wins: Breeders' Cup Classic (1996); Breeders' Cup Distaff (2003); Breeders' Cup Turf Sprint (2008)

Significant horses
- Awesome Again, Dramatic Gold; Alphabet Soup, Touch Gold, Adoration, Starrer
- Updated on July 4, 2024

David E. Hofmans (January 27, 1943 – July 3, 2024) was an American trainer of Thoroughbred racehorses. Born and raised in Los Angeles, when he was a boy his father brought him to watch horse racing at area tracks. While a student at Pasadena City College, he became friends with Gary Jones, the son of a horse trainer and a future trainer himself. Hofmans began learning the business as a groom and hot walker for Jones' father.

As a professional trainer, Hofmans earned his first win in 1974 at Santa Anita Racetrack. After success on California race tracks, in 1996 he gained national attention as the trainer of Alphabet Soup, who defeated the great Cigar in the Breeders' Cup Classic. Training for prominent horseman and Magna Entertainment Corp. chair Frank Stronach, in 1997 Hofmans won Canada's most prestigious race, the Queen's Plate, with Awesome Again and won the Belmont Stakes that saw his colt Touch Gold end Silver Charm's bid for the U.S.Triple Crown. Hofmans won his second Breeders' Cup race in 2003 when Adoration captured the Breeders' Cup Distaff and his third with Desert Code's victory in the 2008 Breeders' Cup Turf Sprint.

In 2006, Hofmans was nominated for induction into the National Museum of Racing and Hall of Fame.

Hofmans died on July 3, 2024, at the age of 81.

== Sources ==
- David Hofmans' profile at the NTRA
