= Ron McAnally =

American horse trainer

Personal information
- Born: July 11, 1932 (age 94) Covington, Kentucky, U.S.
- Occupation: Trainer

Horse racing career
- Sport: Horse racing
- Career wins: 2,500+ (ongoing)

Major racing wins
- Champagne Stakes (1961); Osunitas Handicap (1965, 1981, 1986, 1993, 2004, 2008); John C. Mabee Handicap (1969, 1978, 1986, 2002); Del Mar Debutante Stakes (1975, 1994); Hollywood Gold Cup (1976); Santa Anita Derby (1976); Charles Whittingham Memorial Handicap (1980, 1981, 1984, 2005); Clement L. Hirsch Memorial Turf Championship (1980, 1981, 1982, 1989, 1995); Arlington Million (1981, 1984, 1991); Jockey Club Gold Cup (1981, 1991); Santa Anita Handicap (1981, 1982, 1996); Hollywood Turf Cup Stakes (1983); Eddie Read Handicap (1984, 1991, 2005); Del Mar Oaks (1985, 1996); Hawthorne Handicap (1989, 1990, 1991, 1995, 1999, 2001); Ruffian Handicap (1989); Santa Margarita Invitational Handicap (1989, 1990, 1992, 1994, 1995, 1998); Spinster Stakes (1989, 1990, 1993, 1996); Vanity Handicap (1989, 1991, 1992, 1994); Arkansas Derby (1990, 1991); Santa Maria Handicap (1990, 1992, 1993, 1995, 2001); Hollywood Derby (1991, 2003); Cigar Mile Handicap (1992); Donn Handicap (1992); Yellow Ribbon Stakes (1992, 1995); Hollywood Futurity (1993, 1995); Metropolitan Handicap (1993); Las Virgenes Stakes (1996); Santa Anita Oaks (1996); Queen Elizabeth II Challenge Cup Stakes (2001); Pacific Classic Stakes (2003); Santa Monica Handicap (2003); Gamely Breeders' Cup Handicap (2004); Sunshine Millions Distaff (2006) Breeders' Cup wins: Breeders' Cup Distaff (1989, 1990, 1992); Breeders' Cup Turf (1995)

Racing awards
- Eclipse Award for Outstanding Trainer (1981, 1991, 1992)

Honours
- National Museum of Racing and Hall of Fame (1990)

Significant horses
- Candy Ride, Hawkster, John Henry, Paseana, Bayakoa; Tight Spot, Let's Elope, Northern Spur
- Updated on June 20, 2007

Ronald L. McAnally (born July 11, 1932, in Covington, Kentucky) is an American Hall of Fame trainer in Thoroughbred horse racing. Called "one of the most honored and respected of North American trainers" by Thoroughbred Times Co., Inc, as a child, he and his four siblings were placed in an orphanage following the death of their mother. As an adult, he regularly donates funds to the Covington Protestant Children's Home where he was raised.

After high school, McAnally fulfilled his mandatory military service with the United States Air Force and attended the University of Cincinnati for two years, studying electrical engineering. He began his career in horse racing working at Rockingham Park racetrack in Salem, New Hampshire for his uncle, trainer Reggie Cornell. As a licensed trainer working at California racetracks, in 1958 he got his first win at Hollywood Park Racetrack. In 1960 at Santa Anita Park, he got the first of his more than 2,000 stakes race wins.

He is noted, perhaps because of his childhood experiences, for patiently looking after horses with unique quirks such as the one-eyed Cassaleria and the tail-less Sea Cadet. He also conditioned Silver Ending, a horse bought for $1,500 who under McAnally's care won a number of stakes races including the Arkansas Derby and the then-GI Pegasus Handicap.

In the early 1980s, McAnally and co-trainer VJ "Lefty" Nickerson, gained considerable national recognition as the trainer of John Henry, the two-time United States Horse of the Year and the first of three Hall of Fame horses he trained. John Henry came under McAnally's care at age four having earned $239,613. For McAnally, he won 27 of 45 races and earned $6,358,334.

Another Hall of Fame horse that McAnally trained was Bayakoa, who won back-to-back Breeders' Cup Distaffs in 1989 and 1990 and was voted the Eclipse Award for Outstanding Older Female Horse both years. Two years later, he conditioned his third Hall of Famer, a filly named Paseana who also won the Breeders' Cup Distaff in 1992 and was voted the Eclipse Award for Outstanding Older Female Horse Eclipse for two years running. McAnally's best results in the American Classic Races were a fourth in the 1980 and 1982 Kentucky Derby, a fourth in the 1989 Preakness Stakes, and a fifth-place finish in the 1989 Belmont Stakes.

Personal honors include the Eclipse Award for Outstanding Trainer three times and induction into the National Museum of Racing and Hall of Fame.

Married with three daughters, McAnally makes his home in Tarzana, California.
