= Chris McCarron =

American thoroughbred racing jockey (born 1955)

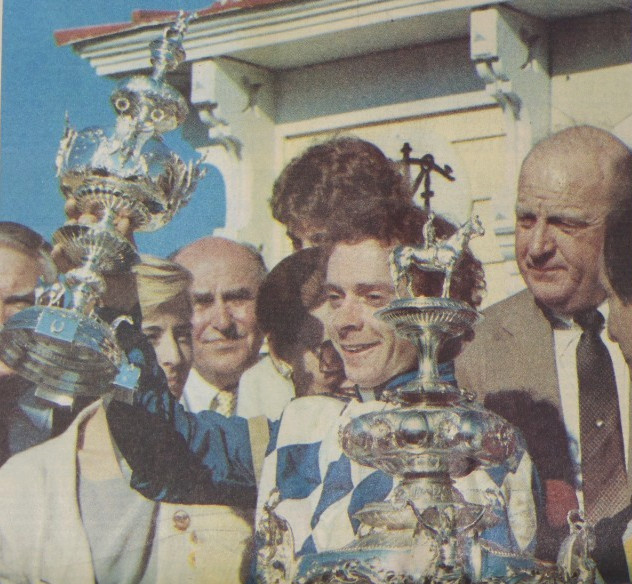
- McCarron holding the 1987 Preakness Stakes trophy

Personal information
- Born: March 27, 1955 (age 71) Boston, Massachusetts, US
- Occupation: Jockey

Horse racing career
- Sport: Horse racing
- Career wins: 7,141

Major racing wins
- Kentucky Oaks (1977, 1990, 2002) Rancho Bernardo Handicap (1978, 1983, 1986, 1987, 1995, 1996, 1997); Del Mar Oaks (1979, 1984, 1989, 1991); Del Mar Futurity (1979, 1988, 1992, 1997); Del Mar Handicap (1979, 1981, 1984, 1988, 1998, 2000); Del Mar Debutante Stakes (1980, 1981, 1984); La Jolla Handicap (1980, 1981, 1982, 1984, 1987, 1989, 1993); San Bernardino Handicap (1980, 1982, 1986, 1988, 1997, 2002); Clement L. Hirsch Handicap (1981, 1988, 1994, 1995, 1996, 1997, 2000); Hawthorne Handicap (1981, 1987, 1995, 1997, 1998, 1999, 2000, 2001); San Felipe Stakes (1982, 1983, 1986, 1988, 1991, 1993, 1998); Florida Derby (1981); Eddie Read Handicap (1981); Bing Crosby Handicap (1982); Jockey Club Gold Cup (1982, 1993); Palomar Breeders' Cup Handicap (1983, 1992, 1996, 1997); Arlington Million (1984); Fantasy Stakes (1984, 1987, 1989, 1992); San Clemente Handicap (1984, 1985, 1991, 1994, 1995); Hollywood Gold Cup (1984); Breeders' Cup Sprint (1985); Woodward Stakes (1986, 1988); Del Mar Breeders' Cup Mile (1987, 1988, 1995, 1998); Santa Anita Handicap (1988, 1999, 2001); Haskell Invitational Handicap (1989, 1997); Native Diver Handicap (1989, 1990, 1991, 1992); Santa Anita Derby (1991, 1996, 2000, 2002); John C. Mabee Handicap (1992, 1993, 1994); San Diego Handicap (1993, 1994, 1995, 1997, 1998, 1999); Pacific Classic Stakes (1998) International race wins: Canadian International Stakes (1987); Japan Cup (1988) American Classics wins: Kentucky Derby (1987, 1994); Preakness Stakes (1987, 1992); Belmont Stakes (1986, 1997) Breeders' Cup wins: Breeders' Cup Classic (1988, 1989, 1996, 2000, 2001); Breeders' Cup Distaff (1992); Breeders' Cup Juvenile (1992) Breeders' Cup Turf (1995)

Racing awards
- United States Champion Jockey by wins (1974, 1975, 1980); United States Champion Jockey by earnings (1980, 1981, 1984, 1991); U.S. Champion Apprentice Jockey (1974); Eclipse Award for Outstanding Jockey (1980); George Woolf Memorial Jockey Award (1980); Mike Venezia Memorial Award (1991); Big Sport of Turfdom Award (1993)

Honours
- United States' Racing Hall of Fame (1989)

Significant horses
- John Henry, Alysheba, Desert Wine, Danzig Connection, Precisionist, Pine Bluff, Lady's Secret, Sunday Silence, Paseana, Touch Gold, Tiznow, Flawlessly, Alphabet Soup, Go for Gin

Christopher John McCarron (born March 27, 1955, Boston, Massachusetts) is a retired American thoroughbred horse racing Hall of Fame jockey. He mounted his first horse ever at 16.5 years old and was racing professionally by 18. At only 19 years old (his first year as a jockey) Chris McCarron wove a spell that brought his mounts to the winner's circle 547 times in 1974, breaking all records for most races won in a year. The previous record was set by Sandy Hawley in 1973 with 515 wins in a year.

He was introduced to the sport of thoroughbred racing by his older brother, jockey Gregg McCarron. Chris McCarron began riding professionally in 1974 at East Coast racetracks where he won the 1974 Eclipse Award for Outstanding Apprentice Jockey in the United States.

He moved to race in California in 1977, a year he scored his first of three wins in the Kentucky Oaks. In 1980 he won the Eclipse Award for Outstanding Jockey as best overall jockey and that same year his peers voted him the prestigious George Woolf Memorial Jockey Award. In 1991, he was voted the Mike Venezia Memorial Award for "extraordinary sportsmanship and citizenship".

McCarron won nine Breeders' Cup races, including five Breeders' Cup Classics, and rode six winners in the U.S. Triple Crown Races. Other major wins for McCarron include the Del Mar Oaks (4), Del Mar Futurity (4), Del Mar Handicap (6), Del Mar Debutante Stakes (3), La Jolla Handicap (7), San Bernardino Handicap (6), Clement L. Hirsch Handicap (7), San Felipe Stakes (7), Florida Derby, Eddie Read Handicap, Bing Crosby Handicap, Jockey Club Gold Cup (2), Arlington Million, Fantasy Stakes (4), San Clemente Handicap (5), Hollywood Gold Cup, Woodward Stakes (2), Santa Anita Handicap (3), Haskell Invitational (2), Santa Anita Derby (4), San Diego Handicap (6), Pacific Classic, Canadian International and Japan Cup. McCarron led all North American jockeys in earnings in 1980, 1981, 1984 and 1991. He also topped the leaderboard in wins in 1974, 1975 and 1980.

In 1989, Chris McCarron was inducted into the National Museum of Racing and Hall of Fame. After 28 years in racing he retired in June 2002. He finished as thoroughbred racing's ALL-TIME leader in purse earnings with more than $264 million in winnings and 7,141 races won. He won about 21% of the races he rode, a percentage that only 5 jockeys have ever held.

In 2003, McCarron served as a technical advisor, racing designer and actor in the 2003 film Seabiscuit. That same year he was hired by Magna Entertainment Corp. to serve as vice president and general manager of Santa Anita Park. After resigning his job at Santa Anita in January 2005, he announced he would be opening the first ever riding academy in the United States: the North American Racing Academy which is part of the Kentucky Community and Technical College System. In 2008, he was working as a racing analyst for TVG Network for only a year.

== Year-end charts ==
Chart (2000–2002)	Peak position
National Earnings List for Jockeys 2000	6
National Earnings List for Jockeys 2001	6
National Earnings List for Jockeys 2002	52
