= The Thoroughbred Corp. =

Thoroughbred horse racing and breeding operation

The Thoroughbred Corporation is a Thoroughbred horse racing and breeding operation established in 1994 by principal partner Prince Ahmed bin Salman of the Saudi Arabian royal family. It was based at an 18-acre (73,000 m^{2}) facility at Bradbury Estates, in Bradbury, California.

Educated at the University of California, Irvine, Prince Ahmed and college friend Richard Mulhall teamed up to go into Thoroughbred flat racing. Initially, Mulhall served as horse trainer but eventually became manager of racing operations. The Prince invested millions of dollars and succeeded in building a quality stable that was an important part of American and European racing.

The Thoroughbred Corp. won four American Classic Races, four Breeders' Cups, and is one of only four owners to have ever raced both a Kentucky Derby winner and an Epsom Derby winner. The others are John W. Galbreath, Michael Tabor, and Paul Mellon.

Some of the notable horses raced by The Thoroughbred Corp. include:

Based in the United States:

- Jewel Princess - (in partnership with Richard and Martha Stephen), won the 1996 Breeders' Cup Distaff and was voted Eclipse Award for Outstanding Older Female Horse
- Sharp Cat - won 7 Grade 1 races in 1996, 1997, and 1998
- Anees - won the 1999 Breeders' Cup Juvenile; voted the Eclipse Award for Outstanding 2-Year-Old Male Horse
- Spain - won the 2000 Breeders' Cup Distaff; retired as the richest mare in North American racing history
- Point Given - won the 2001 Preakness and Belmont Stakes; voted United States Horse of the Year
- Johar - won the 2002 Hollywood Derby and the 2003 Breeders' Cup Turf
- War Emblem - won the 2002 Kentucky Derby and Preakness Stakes; voted the Eclipse Award for Outstanding 3-Year-Old Male Horse

Based in Europe:

- Dr Fong - in 1998 won the Prix Eugène Adam, St. James's Palace Stakes
- Royal Anthem - won the 1998 Canadian International Stakes and 1999 Juddmonte International
- Oath - won the 1999 Epsom Derby
- Elusive City - won the 2002 Prix Morny, voted Champion 2-Year-Old in France

Prince Ahmed bin Salman died unexpectedly at age 43 of heart failure in Riyadh. In March 2004, the bulk of The Thoroughbred Corp.'s horses were dispersed at a southern California auction and the organization's activities suspended.

In 2022, the family of the late Prince Ahmed revived The Thoroughbred Corp. with six fillies in training with John and Thady Gosden and the corporation's colors gradually returning to the racing tracks in the United Kingdom.

The operation returned to major success in 2026, with Green Empress and Miss Scott both winning Group 1 races at Longchamp on 4 October.

== Notable victories since the 2022 revival ==
Ireland

- Green Empress – won the 2026 Alpha Centauri Debutante Stakes (Group 2) at the Curragh; trained by Joseph Patrick O'Brien, ridden by Dylan Browne McMonagle.
- Miss Scott – won the 2026 Snow Fairy Fillies Stakes (Group 3) at the Curragh; trained by John and Thady Gosden, ridden by Christophe Soumillon.

France

- Green Empress – won the 2026 Qatar Prix Marcel Boussac – Critérium des Pouliches (Group 1) at Longchamp; trained by Joseph Patrick O'Brien, ridden by Christophe Soumillon.
- Miss Scott – won the 2026 Prix de l'Opéra Longines (Group 1) at Longchamp; trained by John and Thady Gosden, ridden by Christophe Soumillon.
