= Marshall Naify =

American motion picture and media tycoon

Marshall Naify (March 23, 1920 – April 19, 2000) was a motion picture and media tycoon who was a long-term chairman of the board of United Artists and later became founder and co-chairman of the board of Todd-AO, the largest independent post-production sound studio in the United States which worked on Apollo 13 and other major films.

== Biography ==
Marshall Naify worked in the theater business nearly all his life. Marshall Naify and his brother Robert Naify were members of The Forbes 400 beginning in 1987 with an estimated combined net worth of $4.3 billion. They merged the family's theater chain with United Artists Theater Circuit and eventually became the majority shareholders. They sold that company in 1986 to John Malone's Telecommunications Inc. (TCI) for cash and stock. The Naify brothers were also pioneers in the cable television industry, entering the business in the 1950s.

Marshall Naify also invested in Canadian gold stocks.

An art lover, Naify became an art sponsor, contributor and collector.

In 1999, Marshall Naify married Lily Cates, widow of director/producer Joseph Cates and mother of Phoebe Cates. Marshall Naify was married to Valerie Naify, a former actress, for 32 years with whom he had two children.

== Thoroughbred horse racing ==
Marshall Naify owned and raced Thoroughbred horses. In 1991 he acquired a 265-acre (1.07 km^{2}) farm near Lexington, Kentucky. Formerly known as Pillar Stud, he renamed it 505 Farms and raced under that name. Among the best-known of his horses were Manistique and Bertrando, the latter owned in partnership with Edward Nahem. Bertrando was a multiple Grade I winner and the 1993 American Champion Older Male Horse.

Following his death, his daughter, Marsha, sold the property and the horses through a Barretts Equine Ltd. dispersal sale. The farm was eventually acquired by its current operator, trainer, Kenneth McPeek but Marsha Naify remains involved in racing as an owner.
