= Affirmed Stakes (LATC) =

Horse race held in California, U.S.

- Class: Listed
- Location: Santa Anita Park; Arcadia, California, USA
- Inaugurated: 1979 as Silver Screen Handicap at Hollywood Park Racetrack
- Race type: Thoroughbred – Flat racing
- Website: www.santaanita.com

Race information
- Distance: 1 1/16 miles
- Surface: Dirt
- Track: left-handed
- Qualification: Three-year-olds
- Weight: 124 lbs with allowances
- Purse: $100,000 (since 2009)

The Affirmed Stakes is a Listed American thoroughbred horse race for three-year-old horses over a distance of 1 1/16 miles on the dirt held at Santa Anita Park in Arcadia, California, in late June. The race currently offers a purse of $100,000.

== History ==
The inaugural running of the event was on 30 June 1979 at Hollywood Park Racetrack as the Silver Screen Handicap at a distance of 1 1/8 miles and was won by the promising three year old Valdez who won by 10 lengths, which continues to be the longest winning margin in the event.

The event inherited the grading classification which was Grade II from the Argonaut Handicap which some sources believe is the predecessor to the event. However, the former Hollywood Park Media Guide management organization and the current Santa Anita management consider the event to have no connection.

In 1993 the race was renamed to the Affirmed Handicap in honor of the 1978 U.S. Triple Crown champion, Affirmed.

In 1995 the distance of the event was decreased to 1 1/16 miles.

After Hollywood Park Racetrack was closed in 2013 the race was moved to Santa Anita Park.

In 2020 due to the COVID-19 pandemic in the United States, Santa Anita closed their track and the event was cancelled

In 2023 the American Graded Stakes Committee downgraded the event to a Listed race.

== Records ==
Speed record:

- 1 1/16 miles – 1:40.83 General Challenge (1999)
- 1 1/8 miles – 1:46.80 Journey At Sea (1982)

Largest margin of victory:

- 10 lengths – Valdez (1979)

Most wins by a jockey:

- 5 – Laffit Pincay, Jr. (1979, 1984, 1985, 1990, 1992)

Most wins by a trainer:

- 7 – Bob Baffert (1999, 2006, 2011, 2014, 2015, 2019, 2024)

Most wins by an owner:

- 2 – Karl Watson, Michael E. Pegram & Paul Weitman (2011, 2015)

== Winners ==
Year	Winner	Jockey	Trainer	Owner	Distance	Time	Purse	Grade	Ref
At Santa Anita Park – Affirmed Stakes
2024	Parenting	Juan J. Hernandez	Bob Baffert	Gandharvi	1 1/16 miles	1:42.57	$100,000	Listed	
2023	Geaux Rocket Ride	Ramon Vazquez	Richard Mandella	Pin Oak Stud	1 1/16 miles	1:43.75	$100,000	Listed	
2022	Hopper	Abel Cedillo	Sean McCarthy	Lanni Bloodstock, Madaket Stables & SF Racing	1 1/16 miles	1:43.83	$98,000	III	
2021	The Chosen Vron	Umberto Rispoli	J. Eric Kruljac	J. Eric Kruljac, Robert Fetkin, John Sondereker & Richard Thornburgh	1 1/16 miles	1:44.01	$100,000	III	
2020	Race not held								
2019	Mucho Gusto	Joseph Talamo	Bob Baffert	Michael Lund Petersen	1 1/16 miles	1:45.15	$100,351	III	
2018	Draft Pick	Joseph Talamo	Peter Eurton	C R K Stable	1 1/16 miles	1:44.34	$100,345	III	
2017	Battle of Midway	Flavien Prat	Jerry Hollendorfer	Don Alberto Stable & WinStar Farm	1 1/16 miles	1:43.25	$98,000	III	
2016	Dalmore	Kent J. Desormeaux	J. Keith Desormeaux	Big Chief Racing, Rocker O Ranch & J. Keith Desormeaux	1 1/16 miles	1:40.84	$100,000	III	
2015	Gimme Da Lute	Martin Garcia	Bob Baffert	Karl Watson, Michael E. Pegram & Paul Weitman	1 1/16 miles	1:41.40	$98,000	III	
2014	Can the Man	Martin Garcia	Bob Baffert	Kaleem Shah	1 1/16 miles	1:44.27	$100,750	III	
At Hollywood Park – Affirmed Handicap
2013	Tiz a Minister	Corey Nakatani	Paul G. Aguirre	S A Y Racing	1 1/16 miles	1:45.79	$100,750	III	
2012	Nonios	Martin A. Pedroza	Jerry Hollendorfer	Green B. Smith Jr.	1 1/16 miles	1:42.99	$100,000	III	
2011	Coil	Martin Garcia	Bob Baffert	Karl Watson, Michael E. Pegram & Paul Weitman	1 1/16 miles	1:42.88	$100,000	III	
2010	Golden Itiz	Tyler Baze	Ronald W. Ellis	Jay Em Ess Stable	1 1/16 miles	1:42.84	$100,000	III	
2009	Grazen	Rafael Bejarano	Mike R. Mitchell	Nicholas B. Alexander	1 1/16 miles	1:41.40	$100,000	III	
2008	Two Step Salsa	Martin A. Pedroza	Julio C. Canani	Everest Stables	1 1/16 miles	1:41.57	$107,100	III	
2007	Desert Code	Richard Migliore	David E. Hofmans	Tarabilla Farms	1 1/16 miles	1:44.21	$106,600	III	
2006	Point Determined	Victor Espinoza	Bob Baffert	Robert B. & Beverly J. Lewis Trust	1 1/16 miles	1:42.55	$100,000	III	
2005	Indian Ocean	Jon Court	Jay M. Robbins	Mercedes Stable	1 1/16 miles	1:42.53	$102,998	III	
2004	Boomzeeboom	Victor Espinoza	Vladimir Cerin	John Karubian, Alan Landsburg & Larry Postaer	1 1/16 miles	1:42.11	$110,200	III	
2003	Eye of the Tiger	Alex O. Solis	Jerry Hollendorfer	John D. Gunther	1 1/16 miles	1:42.30	$103,096	III	
2002	Came Home	Chris McCarron	J. Paco Gonzalez	William S. Farish III, John B. Goodman, John Toffan & Trudy McCaffery	1 1/16 miles	1:41.99	$107,500	III	
2001	Until Sundown	Gary L. Stevens	Laura de Seroux	San Gabriel Investments & Sidney L. Port Trust	1 1/16 miles	1:43.10	$100,000	III	
2000	Tiznow	Victor Espinoza	Jay M. Robbins	Michael Cooper & Cecilia Straub-Rubens	1 1/16 miles	1:42.35	$134,250	III	
1999	General Challenge	David R. Flores	Bob Baffert	Golden Eagle Farm	1 1/16 miles	1:40.83	$125,000	III	
1998	Old Trieste	Chris McCarron	Mike Puype	Gary Bisantz	1 1/16 miles	1:41.80	$101,822	III	
1997	Deputy Commander	Corey Nakatani	Wallace Dollase	Horizon Stable, Michael Jarvis, Mandysland Farm, et al.	1 1/16 miles	1:42.80	$102,500	III	
1996	Hesabull	Eddie Delahoussaye	Mike Chambers	Three Sisters Thoroughbreds	1 1/16 miles	1:43.20	$101,750	III	
1995	Mr Purple	Corey Nakatani	Ron McAnally	Alex G. Campbell Jr.	1 1/16 miles	1:42.20	$133,300	III	
1994	R Friar Tuck	Jerry D. Bailey	Ian P. D. Jory	S. David Plummer	1 1/8 miles	1:49.00	$163,600	III	
1993	Codified	Gary L. Stevens	David E. Hofmans	Ridder Thoroughbred Stable	1 1/8 miles	1:48.80	$161,600	III	
Silver Screen Handicap
1992	Natural Nine	Laffit Pincay Jr.	Lewis A. Cenicola	Southern Nevada Racing Stables	1 1/8 miles	1:49.40	$163,000	III	
1991	Compelling Sound	Gary L. Stevens	Charles E. Whittingham	Mr. & Mrs. Jerome Moss	1 1/8 miles	1:47.80	$158,800	III	
1990	Stalwart Charger	Laffit Pincay Jr.	Alcides Pico Perdomo	Sidney Factor	1 1/8 miles	1:48.40	$158,600	III	
1989	Raise a Stanza	Corey Black	Jay M. Robbins	Jack Kent Cooke	1 1/8 miles	1:48.40	$169,700	II	
1988	Iz a Saros	Aaron Gryder	Joseph Manzi	Green Thumb Farm Stable	1 1/8 miles	1:49.00	$163,400	II	
1987	Candi's Gold	Gary L. Stevens	Edwin J. Gregson	Royal Lines (Lessee)	1 1/8 miles	1:47.60	$160,500	II	
1986	ƒ Melair	Pat Valenzuela	John W. Sadler	Marianne Millard & Bea Rous	1 mile	1:32.80	$400,000	II	
1985	Pancho Villa	Laffit Pincay Jr.	D. Wayne Lukas	D. Wayne Lukas & Lloyd R. French, Jr.	1 mile	1:33.80	$109,500	II	
1984	Tights	Laffit Pincay Jr.	Laz Barrera	Mill House	1 1/8 miles	1:48.60	$80,600	II	
1983	My Habitony	Donald Pierce	Arthur J. Lerille Jr.	Olga J. Pejsa	1 1/8 miles	1:48.60	$81,000	II	
1982	Journey At Sea	Chris McCarron	Leland R. Fenstermaker	Fred W. Hooper	1 1/8 miles	1:46.80	$83,350	II	
1981	Stancharry	Pat Valenzuela	Melvin F. Stute	Harry Cole, Stanley Freeman & Charles Gold	1 1/8 miles	1:51.00	$80,900	II	
1980	Score Twenty Four	Darrel G. McHargue	James Jordan	Thomas Capehart, et al.	1 1/8 miles	1:48.20	$64,200	II	
1979	Valdez	Laffit Pincay Jr.	Laz Barrera	Aaron & Marie Jones	1 1/8 miles	1:47.40	$64,500	II	

Legend:
All Weather Track Dirt
Notes:
ƒ Filly or Mare

== See also ==
- List of American and Canadian Graded races
