= Cinema Stakes =

American thoroughbred horse racer

- Class: Ungraded
- Location: Santa Anita Park; Arcadia, California, U.S.
- Inaugurated: 1946 (as Cinema Handicap at Hollywood Park Racetrack)
- Race type: Thoroughbred - Flat racing
- Website: www.santaanita.com

Race information
- Distance: 1 1/4 miles (10 furlongs)
- Surface: Turf
- Track: Left-handed
- Qualification: Three-year-olds
- Weight: 124 lbs. with allowances
- Purse: $100,000

The Cinema Stakes is an American Thoroughbred horse race for three-year-old horses held annually at Santa Anita Park Arcadia, California. Raced on turf originally over a distance of one and one-eighth miles (9 furlongs) in late May or early June. In 2023, the race was extended to one and one-quarter miles (10 furlongs).

== History ==
The event was inaugurated in 1946 at Hollywood Park Racetrack.

The race was run in two divisions in 1961 and 1963. It was not run in 1974.

In 1973 the event was given Grade II status. It held this classification until 1994 when it was downgraded to Grade III.

The event was not held from 2010 to 2018.

In 2016 the event was renewed as the Rainbow Stakes at Santa Anita Park and renamed back to the Cinema Stakes in 2019.

== Winners since 1985 ==
Year	Winner	Jockey	Trainer	Owner	Time
At Santa Anita Park – Cinema Stakes
2023	Wizard of Westwood	Abel Cedillo	Michael McCarthy	Andrew N. Warren and Rania Warren	2:01.27
2022	War At Sea	Mike Smith	Ronald Ellis	Doubledown Stables	1:49.97
2021	Hudson Ridge	Abel Cedillo	Bob Baffert	Double L Racing & Natalie J. Baffert	1:49.06
2020	Hariboux	Umberto Rispoli	Jeff Mullins	Red Baron's Barn LLC and Rancho Temescal LLC	1:50.29
2019	Neptune's Storm	Drayden Van Dyke	Richard Baltas	CYBT, Gevertz, Saul, Gitomer, Lynn, Goetz, Mike, Nentwig, Michael and Weiner, Daniel	1:48.65
Rainbow Stakes
2018	River Boyne	Flavien Prat	Jeff Mullins	Red Baron's Barn LLC and Rancho Temescal LLC	1:49.18
2017	Sharp Samurai	Gary Stevens	Mark Glatt	Red Baron's Barn LLC, Rancho Temescal LLC and Glatt, Mark	1:47.51
2016	Mr. Roary	Edwin Maldonado	Jeff Mullins	Tim Rosselli	1:47.48
2010–15	Not Held				
At Hollywood Park – Cinema Handicap
2009	Oil Man	Joel Rosario	John W. Sadler	Tommy Town/Michael Tala	1:48.72
2008	Tiz West	Victor Espinoza	Richard E. Mandella	Diamond A Racing Corp	1:47.24
2007	Worldly	Victor Espinoza	Ben D. A. Cecil	Christopher Wright	1:47.40
2006	Genre	Martin Pedroza	Ben D. A. Cecil	David & Paula Mueller	1:47.73
2005	Willow O Wisp	Garrett Gomez	Vladimir Cerin	Robert Alexander	1:48.59
2004	Greek Sun	Alex Solis	Robert J. Frankel	Peter Angelos	1:48.40
2003	Just Wonder	Kent Desormeaux	Laura de Seroux	Vistas LLC et al.	1:47.41
2002	Inesperado	Kent Desormeaux	Robert J. Frankel	3 Plus U Stable	1:47.63
2001	Sligo Bay	Laffit Pincay Jr.	C. Beau Greely	Columbine Stable	1:48.40
2000	David Copperfield	Victor Espinoza	John Shirreffs	505 Farms	1:47.73
1999	Fighting Falcon	Brice Blanc	David Hofmans	Dion Recachina et al.	1:48.06
1998	Commitisize	David Flores	Bob Baffert	Michael E. Peagram	1:48.00
1997	Worldly Ways	Corey Nakatani	Wallace Dollase	John & Betty Mabee	1:48.43
1996	Let Bob Do It	Kent Desormeaux	John W. Sadler	Roxy Roxborough et al.	1:47.58
1995	Via Lombardia	Eddie Delahoussaye	Neil D. Drysdale	Henry E. Pabst	1:47.22
1994	Unfinished Symph	Gary Baze	Wesley A. Ward	N. Rice, T. Hatcher, J. Johnston	1:46.56
1993	Earl of Barking	Chris McCarron	Richard L. Cross	Henry E. Pabst	1:47.45
1992	Bien Bien	Chris McCarron	J. Paco Gonzalez	Trudy McCaffery & John Toffan	1:47.10
1991	Character	Gary Stevens	Bruce C. Jackson	Jack Munari	1:47.10
1990	Jovial	Gary Stevens	Bruce C. Jackson	Jack Munari	1:47.80
1989	Raise a Stanza †	Gary Stevens	Jay M. Robbins	Jack Kent Cooke	1:47.80
1988	Peace	Alex Solis	Charlie Whittingham	Olin B. Gentry	1:46.80
1987	Something Lucky	Laffit Pincay, Jr.	Donald Warren	E.W. Johnston/H. Meloth/J. Stonebraker	1:46.80
1986	Manila	Fernando Toro	LeRoy Jolley	Bradley M. Shannon	1:47.00
1985	Don't Say Halo	Darrel McHargue	Chris Speckert	Buckland Farm	1:47.60

- † In 1989, Notorious Pleasure finished first but was disqualified and set back to third.

== Earlier winners ==
- 1984 - Prince True
- 1983 - Baron O'Dublin
- 1982 - Give Me Strength
- 1981 - Minnesota Chief
- 1980 - First Albert
- 1979 - Beau's Eagle
- 1978 - Kamehameha
- 1977 - Bad 'N Big
- 1976 - Majestic Light
- 1975 - Terete
- 1974 - no race
- 1973 - Amen
- 1972 - Finalista
- 1971 - Niagara
- 1970 - Dartagnan
- 1969 - Noholme Jr.
- 1968 - Pinjara
- 1967 - Dr. Roy E.
- 1966 - Drin
- 1965 - Arksroni
- 1964 - Close By
- 1963 - Y Flash
- 1962 - Black Sheep
- 1961 - Bushel-N-Peck
- 1960 - New Policy
- 1959 - Silver Spoon
- 1958 - The Shoe
- 1957 - Round Table
- 1956 - Social Climber
- 1955 - Guilton Madero
- 1954 - Miz Clementine
- 1953 - Ali's Gem
- 1952 - A Gleam
- 1951 - Mucho Hosso
- 1950 - Great Circle
- 1949 - Pedigree
- 1948 - Drumbeat
- 1947 - Yankee Valor
- 1946 - Honeymoon
