= Hollywood Turf Cup Stakes =

- Class: Grade 2
- Location: Del Mar Racetrack; Del Mar, California, United States
- Inaugurated: 1981 (as Hollywood Park Racetrack)
- Race type: Thoroughbred – Flat racing Del Mar

Race information
- Distance: 1 1/2 miles (12 furlongs)
- Surface: Turf
- Track: Left-handed
- Qualification: Three-year-olds and older
- Weight: Base weights with allowances Three-year-olds – 122 lbs. Older – 126 lbs.
- Purse: $200,000 (2023)

The Hollywood Turf Cup is a Grade II American Thoroughbred horse race for three-years-old or older over a distance of one and one-half miles (12 furlongs) on the turf track scheduled annually in late November at Del Mar Racetrack in Del Mar, California. The event currently carries a purse of $200,000.

== History ==
The inaugural running of the event was on 6 December 1981 under Weight-for-Age conditions with an impressive purse of US500,000 added. The event as planned by West Coast racing administration attracted some fine horses including Europeans who had come to the US to run in the Washington, D.C. International. The event was won by the Irish-bred Providential who raced in the US as Providential II and had previously won the Washington, D.C. International in a star studded field which included John Henry who was the leading stakes winner in the US at the time and started as the 2/5 odds-on favorite.

The race was run in two divisions in 1982 at a shorter distance of 1 3/8 miles.

In 1983 the American Graded Stakes Committee classified the event with the highest status of Grade I. John Henry returned to make amends in 1983 to win and become the first racehorse to surpass $4 million in career earnings. In 1985 the distance of the event was returned to its initial distance of 1 1/2 miles.

In 1991 the winner Miss Alleged was the only filly to ever win this race.

Horses who previously ran in the Breeders' Cup Turf would sometimes run in the Turf Cup since it is the last major turf race of the year.

The race was not run in 2005 due to problems with Hollywood Park's grass course not being ready after the turf course was reseeded. The event was not held in 2009 as several high profile events were cancelled in an effort to sustain overnight purses with a shortened meeting of only 27 days.

The event was downgraded in 2012 to Grade II. With the closure of Hollywood Park Racetrack in 2013 the event was moved to Del Mar Racetrack.

== Records ==
Speed record:

- 1 1/2 miles: 2:24.61 – Boboman (2006)
- 1 3/8 miles: 2:13.40 – The Hague (1982)

Margins:

- 6 lengths – Fraise (1993)

Most wins:

- 2 – Alphabatim (1984, 1986)
- 2 – Lazy Lode (1998, 1999)
- 2 - Truly Quality (2024, 2025)

Most wins by an owner:

- 3 – Juddmonte Farms (Prince Khalid Abdullah) (1984, 1986, 2008)

Most wins by a jockey:

- 8 – Chris McCarron (1983, 1984, 1989, 1991, 1992, 1993, 1996, 2000)

Most wins by a trainer:

- 4 – Robert J. Frankel (1997, 2001, 2003, 2008)
- 4 – Richard E. Mandella (1986, 1999, 2006, 2023)

== Winners ==
Year	Winner	Age	Jockey	Trainer	Owner	Distance	Time	Purse	Grade	Ref
At Del Mar
2025	Truly Quality	5	Mirco Demuro	Jonathan Thomas	Augustin Stables	1 1/2 miles	2:29.67	$202,000	II	
2024	Truly Quality	4	Vincent Cheminaud	Jonathan Thomas	Augustin Stables	1 1/2 miles	2:28.54	$202,000	II	
2023	Planetario (BRZ)	5	Hector Berrios	Richard E. Mandella	Red Rafa Stud	1 1/2 miles	2:28.02	$201,000	II	
2022	Prince Abama (IRE)	4	Flavien Prat	Philip D'Amato	Michael House	1 1/2 miles	2:29.42	$251,000	II	
2021	Say the Word	6	Kent Desormeaux	Philip D'Amato	Agave Racing Stable and Sam-Son Farm	1 1/2 miles	2:27.62	$251,000	II	
2020	Arklow	6	Joel Rosario	Brad H. Cox	Donegal Racing, Joseph Bulger & Estate of Peter Coneway	1 1/2 miles	2:26.31	$203,500	II	
2019	Oscar Dominguez (IRE)	6	John R. Velazquez	Richard Baltas	Nancy Messineo & Bruce Sands	1 1/2 miles	2:28.17	$201,755	II	
2018	Chicago Style	5	Drayden Van Dyke	Thomas F. Proctor	Glen Hill Farm	1 1/2 miles	2:28.53	$200,690	II	
2017	Manitoulin	4	Mike E. Smith	James J. Toner	Darby Dan Farm Racing	1 1/2 miles	2:30.16	$200,690	II	
2016	Texas Ryano	5	Joseph Talamo	Carla Gaines	Warren B. Williamson	1 1/2 miles	2:27.92	$200,345	II	
2015	The Pizza Man	6	Mike E. Smith	Roger A. Brueggemann	Midwest Thoroughbreds	1 1/2 miles	2:31.75	$252,250	II	
2014	Finnegans Wake	5	Victor Espinoza	Peter L. Miller	Donegal Racing & Rockingham Ranch	1 1/2 miles	2:27.35	$251,250	II	
At Hollywood Park
2013	Lucayan (FR)	4	Joel Rosario	Neil D. Drysdale	Pandora Stud	1 1/2 miles	2:26.14	$250,250	II	
2012	Grandeur (IRE)	3	Garrett K. Gomez	Patrick Gallagher	Yvonne Jacques	1 1/2 miles	2:27.95	$250,000	II	
2011	Sanagas (GER)	5	Rajiv Maragh	H. Graham Motion	Andreas Jacobs	1 1/2 miles	2:27.53	$250,000	I	
2010	Unusual Suspect	6	Corey Nakatani	Barry Abrams	Barry, David, & Dyan Abrams	1 1/2 miles	2:25.83	$250,000	I	
2009	Race not held									
2008	Champs Elysees (GB)	5	Jose Valdivia Jr.	Robert J. Frankel	Juddmonte Farms	1 1/2 miles	2:27.71	$250,000	I	
2007	Sunriver	4	Garrett K. Gomez	Todd A. Pletcher	Aaron & Marie Jones	1 1/2 miles	2:27.07	$250,000	I	
2006	Boboman	5	Garrett K. Gomez	Richard E. Mandella	Wertheimer et Frère	1 1/2 miles	2:24.61	$250,000	I	
2005	Race not held									
2004	Pellegrino (BRZ)	5	Gary L. Stevens	Donald J. Burke II	Gary A. Tanaka	1 1/2 miles	2:29.73	$250,000	I	
2003	‡ Continuously	4	Alex O. Solis	Robert J. Frankel	Saud bin Khaled	1 1/2 miles	2:29.01	$250,000	I	
2002	Sligo Bay (IRE)	4	Laffit Pincay Jr.	C. Beau Greely	Columbine Stable	1 1/2 miles	2:27.22	$250,000	I	
2001	§ Super Quercus (FR)	5	Alex O. Solis	Robert J. Frankel	3 Plus U Stable	1 1/2 miles	2:29.86	$250,000	I	
2000	Bienamado	4	Chris McCarron	J. Paco Gonzalez	Trudy McCaffery & John Toffan, Robert Sangster	1 1/2 miles	2:25.98	$400,000	I	
1999	Lazy Lode (ARG)	5	Laffit Pincay Jr.	Richard E. Mandella	The Thoroughbred Corporation	1 1/2 miles	2:25.85	$400,000	I	
1998	Lazy Lode (ARG)	4	Corey Nakatani	Wallace Dollase	The Thoroughbred Corporation	1 1/2 miles	2:28.36	$500,000	I	
1997	River Bay	4	Alex O. Solis	Robert J. Frankel	Ecurie Chalhoub	1 1/2 miles	2:26.47	$500,000	I	
1996	Running Flame (FR)	4	Chris McCarron	Mike Puype	Gary E. Biszantz	1 1/2 miles	2:28.53	$500,000	I	
1995	Royal Chariot	5	Alex O. Solis	Edwin J. Gregson	D & V Enterprises	1 1/2 miles	2:25.18	$500,000	I	
1994	Frenchpark (GB)	4	Corey Black	Terry Knight	Hubert Guy	1 1/2 miles	2:25.66	$500,000	I	
1993	Fraise	5	Chris McCarron	William I. Mott	Mrs. Madeleine Paulson	1 1/2 miles	2:32.34	$500,000	I	
1992	† Bien Bien	3	Chris McCarron	J. Paco Gonzalez	Trudy McCaffery & John Toffan	1 1/2 miles	2:31.28	$500,000	I	
1991	Miss Alleged	4	Chris McCarron	Charles E. Whittingham	Fares Farms	1 1/2 miles	2:30.00	$500,000	I	
1990	Itsallgreektome	3	Corey Nakatani	Wallace Dollase	Jhayare Stables	1 1/2 miles	2:24.80	$500,000	I	
1989	Frankly Perfect	4	Chris McCarron	Charles E. Whittingham	Bruce McNall & Wayne Gretzky	1 1/2 miles	2:26.60	$500,000	I	
1988	Great Communicator	5	Ray Sibille	Thad D. Ackel	Class Act Farm	1 1/2 miles	2:34.40	$500,000	I	
1987	Vilzak	4	Pat Day	Jack Van Berg	Harry T. Rosenblum	1 1/2 miles	2:27.00	$500,000	I	
1986	Alphabatim	5	Bill Shoemaker	John Gosden	Prince Khalid Abdullah	1 1/2 miles	2:25.80	$500,000	I	
1985	Zoffany	5	Eddie Delahoussaye	John Gosden	Anthony & John Bodie, Anthony Speelman	1 1/2 miles	2:28.40	$500,000	I	
1984	Alphabatim	3	Chris McCarron	John Gosden	Prince Khalid Abdullah	1 3/8 miles	2:15.80	$500,000	I	
1983	John Henry	8	Chris McCarron	Ron McAnally	Dotsam Stable	1 3/8 miles	2:16.60	$500,000	I	
1982	Prince Spellbound	3	Marco Castaneda	Lester Holt	William L. Pease	1 3/8 miles	2:14.00	$400,000		Division 1
1982	The Hague	3	Fernando Toro	Richard E. Mandella	Elmendorf Farm	1 3/8 miles	2:13.40	$400,000		Division 2
1981	Providential II (IRE)	4	Alain Lequeux	Charles E. Whittingham	Serge Fradkoff	1 1/2 miles	2:26.80	$553,000		

Legend:
Turf
Notes:
§ Ran as an entry
† In 1992, Fraise finished first but officials disqualified him and he was set back to second place for bumping Bien Bien in the stretch.
‡ In 2003, Epicentre won the race but was disqualied for interference in the stretch and set back to third.

== See also ==
List of American and Canadian Graded races
