= Point Determined =

American-bred Thoroughbred racehorse

- Sire: Point Given
- Grandsire: Thunder Gulch
- Dam: Merengue
- Damsire: Broad Brush
- Sex: Stallion
- Foaled: 2003
- Country: United States
- Colour: Bay
- Breeder: Bowman & Higgins Stable & Robert N. Clay
- Owner: Robert and Beverly Lewis Trust
- Trainer: Bob Baffert
- Record: 14: 4-4-1
- Earnings: US$399,428

Major wins
- Affirmed Handicap (2006); Swaps Stakes (2006)

Point Determined was a thoroughbred race horse born in Maryland on March 6, 2003. There were very high expectations of him since he was the largest foal from the first crop of Horse of the Year Point Given in 2003. He was a possible contender for the Triple Crown in 2006.

== Connections ==
Point Determined is owned by the Robert & Beverly Lewis Trust. He is trained by Bob Baffert and is ridden by Rafael Bejarano. He was bred in Maryland by Bowman & Higgins Stable.

== Breeding ==
His sire is Point Given while his dam is Merengue. He was subsequently sold after his racing career at the Keeneland November Sale in 2007 for over $100,000 to Oscar Benavides, an agent. He was moved to the Commonwealth of Kentucky where he entered stud in 2009 at Montesacro Farm.

As of February 2016, stands at Rancho Natoches, La Mochis, Sinaloa, Mexico.

== Racing career ==
Date	Race	Track	Location	Distance	Surface	Condition	Finish
26 December 2005	Maiden	Santa Anita Park	Arcadia, California	6 1/2 furlongs	Dirt	Fast	3rd
13 January 2006	Maiden	Santa Anita Park	Arcadia, California	1 1/16 mi.	Dirt	Fast	1st
3 February 2006	Allowance	Santa Anita Park	Arcadia, California	1 mi.	Dirt	Fast	2nd
17 February 2006	Allowance Optional Claiming	Golden Gate Fields	Albany, California	1 mi.	Dirt	Wet Fast	1st
18 March 2006	San Felipe Stakes	Santa Anita Park	Arcadia, California	1 1/16 mi.	Dirt	Fast	2nd
8 April 2006	Santa Anita Derby	Santa Anita Park	Arcadia, California	1 1/8 mi.	Dirt	Fast	2nd
6 May 2006	Kentucky Derby	Churchill Downs	Lexington, Kentucky	1 1/4 mi.	Dirt	Fast	9th
17 June 2006	Affirmed Handicap	Hollywood Park Racetrack	Inglewood, California	1 1/16 mi.	Dirt	Fast	1st
8 July 2006	Swaps Stakes	Hollywood Park	Inglewood, California	1 1/8 mi.	Dirt	Fast	1st
3 September 2006	Del Mar Derby	Del Mar Racetrack	Del Mar, California	1 1/8 mi.	Turf	Firm	9th
23 September 2006	Super Derby	Louisiana Downs	Bossier City, Louisiana	1 1/8 mi.	Dirt	Fast	7th
