= Ray Sibille =

American jockey

Personal information
- Born: September 13, 1952 (age 73) Sunset, Louisiana, United States
- Occupation: Jockey

Horse racing career
- Sport: Horse racing
- Career wins: 4,264

Major racing wins
- Louisiana Futurity (1972); Colfax Maid Stakes (1977); Black Gold Stakes (1978); Red Camelia Handicap (1978); American Derby (1981); Arlington-Washington Lassie Stakes (1981); Henry P. Russell Handicap (1981, 1982); Pucker Up Stakes (1981); Yellow Ribbon Stakes (1981); Chula Vista Handicap (1982); Del Mar Oaks (1982); Fantasy Stakes (1982, 1985); Illinois Derby (1982); Matriarch Stakes (1982); Santa Ynez Stakes (1982); Yellow Ribbon Stakes (1982); A Gleam Handicap (1983); Autumn Days Handicap (1983); Bayakoa Handicap (1983); Best Pal Stakes (1983); Graduation Stakes (1983); Monrovia Handicap (1983); California Breeders' Champion Stakes (1984); Escondido Handicap (1984); El Cajon Stakes (1984); La Cañada Stakes (1984); San Simeon Handicap (1984, 1985); Santa Maria Handicap (1984); Hollywood Derby (1986); Hollywood Oaks (1987); Santa Ysabel Stakes (1987); Hollywood Turf Cup Stakes (1988); San Juan Capistrano Handicap (1988); San Marcos Handicap (1988); San Luis Obispo Handicap (1988, 1989); Hollywood Invitational Handicap (1989); Baldwin Stakes (1990); Lincoln Heritage Handicap (1995); Purple Violet Stakes (2001) Breeders' Cup wins: Breeders' Cup Turf (1988)

Racing awards
- George Woolf Memorial Jockey Award (2005)

Significant horses
- Great Communicator, Farma Way

Raymond Frederick Sibille (born September 13, 1952, in Sunset, Louisiana) is a retired American Thoroughbred horse racing jockey. In a career that spanned thirty-five years, he rode his first winner on June 29, 1969, at Evangeline Downs in Carencro, Louisiana. In 1973, he moved to compete at the Chicago-area tracks, where he won riding titles at Arlington Park, Hawthorne Race Course, and Sportsman's Park Racetrack. In 1981, he relocated to Southern California, where he won numerous top races. In 1988, trainer Thad Ackel hired him as the regular rider for Great Communicator, and Sibille met his greatest success that year, winning major races such as the Hollywood Turf Cup Stakes, San Juan Capistrano, San Luis Obispo, and San Marcos Handicaps before capping off the year with a win in the Breeders' Cup Turf.

In 1993, Sibille returned to race in Chicago, where he competed until retiring on July 24, 2004. On November 8, 2004, the Illinois House of Representatives recognized his distinguished career and riding accomplishments. In 2005, he was voted the George Woolf Memorial Jockey Award, a one-time honor given annually by the members of the Jockeys' Guild to a jockey in North America who demonstrates high standards of personal and professional conduct, on and off the racetrack.

Sibille was a member of the Jockeys' Guild for more than thirty years and served on its Board of Directors as well as the organization's financial committee. He is an officer of the MacBeth Memorial Jockey Fund, which assists former jockeys experiencing hard times and the Andre Agassi Charitable Foundation for at-risk kids.
