= Bien Bien =

American-bred Thoroughbred racehorse

- Sire: Manila
- Grandsire: Lyphard
- Dam: Stark Winter
- Damsire: Graustark
- Sex: Stallion
- Foaled: 1989
- Country: United States
- Color: Chestnut
- Breeder: William S. Farish III & William S. Kilroy
- Owner: Trudy McCaffery & John Toffan
- Trainer: J. Paco Gonzalez
- Record: 26: 9-8-1
- Earnings: US$2,498,370

Major wins
- Cinema Handicap (1992); Swaps Stakes (1992); Hollywood Turf Cup Stakes (1992); Hollywood Invitational Turf Handicap (1993); Sunset Handicap (1993); San Luis Rey Handicap (1994); San Marcos Handicap (1994); San Juan Capistrano Invitational Handicap (1994)

Honors
- Bien Bien Stakes at Hollywood Park Racetrack

Bien Bien (1989–2002) was an American Thoroughbred racehorse bred by William S. Farish III & William S. Kilroy and raced by Trudy McCaffery and John Toffan.

He won eight stakes races during his career, including four Grade I events. He set a course record of 1:57.75 for 1¼ miles while winning the 1993 Hollywood Invitational Turf Handicap. He also ran second in the 1993 Breeders' Cup Turf to winner Kotashaan.

Bien Bien was retired to stud for the 1995 season. He stood at Mill Ridge Farm near Lexington, Kentucky, until 2000, when he was sent to Kirtlington Stud near Kirtlington, Oxfordshire, England. During his relatively short career at stud, he sired:

- Bienamado (b. 1996) – in France won the Prix de Condé (1998) and in California, the 2000 Hollywood Turf Cup Stakes (2000) and San Juan Capistrano Invitational Handicap (2001) and Charles Whittingham Memorial Handicap. Career earnings of $1,261,089;
- Bien Nicole (b. 1998) – won 2003 Oaklawn Breeders Cup Stakes, Galaxy Stakes. Career earnings of $1,074,620.
- Dream Alliance (2001) – a steeplechaser who won the Welsh Grand National

Bien Bien died of a heart attack at age thirteen on March 11, 2002, after covering a mare at Kirtlington Stud.

== Pedigree ==
Pedigree of Bien Bien, chestnut stallion, 1989
Sire Manila	Lyphard	Northern Dancer	Nearctic
Sire Manila	Lyphard	Northern Dancer	Natalma
Sire Manila	Lyphard	Goofed	Court Martial
Sire Manila	Lyphard	Goofed	Barra
Sire Manila	Dona Ysidra	Le Fabuleux	Wild Risk
Sire Manila	Dona Ysidra	Le Fabuleux	Anguar
Sire Manila	Dona Ysidra	Matriarch	Bold Ruler
Sire Manila	Dona Ysidra	Matriarch	Lyceum
Dam Stark Winter	Graustark	Ribot	Tenerani
Dam Stark Winter	Graustark	Ribot	Romanella
Dam Stark Winter	Graustark	Flower Bowl	Alibhai
Dam Stark Winter	Graustark	Flower Bowl	Flower Bed
Dam Stark Winter	Winter Wren	Princequillo	Prince Rose
Dam Stark Winter	Winter Wren	Princequillo	Cosquilla
Dam Stark Winter	Winter Wren	Flight Bird	Count Fleet
Dam Stark Winter	Winter Wren	Flight Bird	Pocket Edition (family: 9-e)
