= Los Alamitos Derby =

- Class: Listed
- Location: Los Alamitos Race Course; Los Alamitos, California, United States
- Inaugurated: 1974 (as Swap Stakes at Hollywood Park Racetrack)
- Race type: Thoroughbred - Flat racing

Race information
- Distance: 1 1/8 miles (9 furlongs)
- Surface: Dirt
- Qualification: Three-year-olds
- Weight: Assigned
- Purse: $100,000 (2024)

The Los Alamitos Derby (formerly the Swaps Stakes) is a race for Thoroughbred horses run annually at Los Alamitos Race Course in Los Alamitos, California. The race is open to three-year-old horses and is contested at one and one-eighth miles on the dirt. A Listed event, it currently carries a purse of $100,000.

Before 2014, the race was called the Swaps Stakes and was run at Hollywood Park Racetrack before its closure in 2013. At that point, it moved to Los Alamitos.

Prior to 1973 Hollywood Park's stakes schedule included the Hollywood Derby (prior to 1959 named the Westerner), a 11/4 mile stakes run on dirt which tended to attract top 3 year olds. Horses such as Round Table, Bold Reason, and Riva Ridge won the Hollywood Derby after competing in the U.S. Triple Crown. When the Hollywood Derby changed to 11/2 miles on the turf in 1973, there was no 11/4 mile dirt race to attract top 3 year olds from the Triple Crown series. Management decided to add the Swaps Stakes, named in honor of the notable California-bred 1955 Kentucky Derby winner Swaps, to the 1974 July stakes schedule to fill that void. To lure top 3 year olds to enter the Swaps Stakes, at base a $100,000 added event, provisions were included to increase the purse substantially if one or more Triple Crown race winners participated. This came into play the following year when Belmont Stakes winner Avatar entered which triggered an increase of added purse money to $200,000. In 1977 a $300,000 purse attracted Triple Crown winner Seattle Slew, who suffered the first loss of his career when he ran fourth to winner J O Tobin.

The Hollywood Derby continued as a 11/2 mile turf stakes through 1975, after which it was moved to earlier in the meeting to serve as a Kentucky Derby prep race at 11/8 miles on dirt. This prep would serve Affirmed well in 1978 as he would win the Hollywood Derby en route to becoming the 11th Triple Crown champion. The Hollywood Derby became a permanent turf stakes in 1981, contested first at the Hollywood Park Fall Meet, then moving to Del Mar racetrack in 2014 after the closing of Hollywood Park.

Although the inaugural running of the Swaps Stakes was ungraded, it would be contested as a Grade I event from 1975 through 1988. The race was downgraded to a Grade II event in 1989. It regained Grade I in 1999, but this was short-lived as it became a Grade II again in 2002. In 2017, the race was downgraded once more to a Grade III level. Downgraded to Listed in 2022.

== Records ==
Speed record:

- 1:59.20 @ 11/4 miles : Majestic Light (1976)
- 1:45.80 @ 11/8 miles : Free House (1997)

Most wins by a jockey:

- 5 - Chris McCarron (1982, 1984, 1986, 1992, 1998)

Most wins by a trainer:

- 15 - Bob Baffert (2000, 2001, 2003, 2009, 2012, 2015, 2017, 2018, 2019, 2020, 2021, 2022, 2023, 2024, 2025)

Most wins by an owner:

- 5 - Michael Pegram (2000, 2015, 2018, 2020, 2025)

== Winners ==
Year	Winner	Age	Jockey	Trainer	Owner	Dist. (Miles)	Time	Win$	Grade
2025	Nevada Beach	3	Juan J. Hernandez	Bob Baffert	Michael Pegram, Karl Watson, & Paul Weitman	11/8	1:47.59	$100,000	Listed
2024	Wynstock	3	Kyle Frey	Bob Baffert	Edward C. Allred & Jack Liebau	11/8	1:50.51	$100,000	Listed
2023	Reincarnate	3	Juan J. Hernandez	Bob Baffert	SF Racing, Starlight Racing, Madaket Stables, Robert E. Masterson, Stonestreet Stables, Jay A. Schoenfarber, Waves Edge Capital & Catherine Donovan	11/8	1:48.72	$75,000	Listed
2022	High Connection	3	Juan J. Hernandez	Bob Baffert	HRH Prince Sultan Bin Mishal Al Saud	11/8	1:48.98	$75,000	Listed
2021	Classier	3	Mike E. Smith	Bob Baffert	SF Racing, Starlight Racing, & Madaket Stables	11/8	1:49.15	$90,000	G3
2020	Uncle Chuck	3	Luis Saez	Bob Baffert	Michael Pegram, Karl Watson, & Paul Weitman	11/8	1:47.65	$90,000	G3
2019	Game Winner	3	Joel Rosario	Bob Baffert	Gary & Mary West	11/8	1:48.30	$90,000	G3
2018	Once On Whisky	3	Flavien Prat	Bob Baffert	Michael Pegram, Karl Watson, & Paul Weitman	11/8	1:48.93	$90,000	G3
2017	West Coast	3	Drayden Van Dyke	Bob Baffert	Gary & Mary West	11/8	1:48.65	$120,000	G3
2016	Accelerate	3	Tyler Baze	John W. Sadler	Hronis Racing (Kosta & Pete Hronis)	11/8	1:48.48	$120,000	G2
2015	Gimme Da Lute	3	Martin Garcia	Bob Baffert	Michael Pegram, Karl Watson, & Paul Weitman	11/8	1:47.09	$210,000	G2
2014	Shared Belief	3	Mike E. Smith	Jerry Hollendorfer	Jungle Racing LLC	11/8	1:47.01	$300,000	G2
2013	Chief Havoc	3	Rafael Bejarano	Peter Miller	Paul Makin	11/8	1:50.17	$90,000	G2
2012	Blueskiesnrainbows	3	Joe Talamo	Bob Baffert	Bad Boy Racing & Whizway Farms	11/8	1:50.89	$90,000	G2
2011	Dreamy Kid	3	Joe Talamo	Neil Drysdale	Robert S. Evans	11/8	1:50.43	$90,000	G2
2010	Skipshot	3	Joel Rosario	Jerry Hollendorfer	Olympia Star, Inc.	11/8	1:49.94	$120,000	G2
2009	Misremembered	3	Victor Espinoza	Bob Baffert	Bob Baffert & George Jacobs	11/8	1:49.02	$180,000	G2
2008	Tres Borrachos	3	Tyler Baze	C. Beau Greely	John Greely IV & Phil Houchens	11/8	1:49.29	$217,650	G2
2007	Tiago	3	Mike E. Smith	John Shirreffs	Ann & Jerry Moss	11/8	1:48.76	$220,950	G2
2006	Arson Squad	3	Alex Solis	Bruce Headley	Jay Em Ess Stable (Samantha Siegel)	11/8	1:48.45	$217,050	G2
2005	Surf Cat	3	Alex Solis	Bruce Headley	Marsha Naify & Aase Headley	11/8	1:48.07	$192,600	G2
2004	Rock Hard Ten	3	Corey Nakatani	Jason Orman	Mercedes Stable	11/8	1:47.47	$252,780	G2
2003	During	3	Jerry Bailey	Bob Baffert	James McIngvale	11/8	1:49.38	$240,000	G2
2002	Came Home	3	Mike E. Smith	J. Paco Gonzalez	Farish, McCaffery et al.	11/8	1:48:28	$300,000	G2
2001	Congaree	3	Gary Stevens	Bob Baffert	Stonerside Stable	11/8	1:48.61	$300,000	G1
2000	Captain Steve	3	Corey Nakatani	Bob Baffert	Michael Pegram	11/8	1:48.01	$300,000	G1
1999	Cat Thief	3	Pat Day	D. Wayne Lukas	Overbrook Farm	11/8	1:47.87	$300,000	G1
1998	Old Trieste	3	Chris McCarron	Mike Puype	Cobra Farm (Gary & Betty Biszantz)	11/8	1:47.06	$300,000	G2
1997	Free House	3	Kent Desormeaux	J. Paco Gonzalez	John Toffan & Trudy McCaffery	11/8	1:45.80	$300,000	G2
1996	Victory Speech	3	Jerry Bailey	D. Wayne Lukas	Susan Magnier & Michael Tabor	11/8	1:48.20	$300,000	G2
1995	Thunder Gulch	3	Gary Stevens	D. Wayne Lukas	Michael Tabor	11/8	1:49.00	$275,000	G2
1994	Silver Music	3	Chris Antley	Wallace Dollase	Lauren Cohen	11/4	2:00.60	$123,800	G2
1993	Devoted Brass	3	Laffit Pincay Jr.	Noble Threewitt	Don W. Jordens	11/4	2:00.60	$124,000	G2
1992	Bien Bien	3	Chris McCarron	J. Paco Gonzalez	Trudy McCaffery & John Toffan	11/4	2:02.80	$123,400	G2
1991	Best Pal	3	Pat Valenzuela	Gary F. Jones	Golden Eagle Farm	11/4	2:00.60	$120,000	G2
1990	Jovial	3	Gary Stevens	Bruce L. Jackson	Jack Munari	11/4	2:01.20	$120,000	G2
1989	Prized	3	Eddie Delahoussaye	Neil D. Drysdale	Clover Racing & Meadowbrook Farm, et al.	11/4	2:01.80	$232,400	G2
1988	Lively One	3	Bill Shoemaker	Charles E. Whittingham	Thomas J. Curnes (Lessee)	11/4	2:01.00	$131,200	G1
1987	Temperate Sil	3	Bill Shoemaker	Charles E. Whittingham	Frankfurt Stable & Charles E. Whittingham	11/4	2:02.20	$124,400	G1
1986	Clear Choice	3	Chris McCarron	D. Wayne Lukas	Eugene V. & Joyce F. Klein	11/4	2:03.60	$137,000	G1
1985	Padua	3	Pat Valenzuela	Gary F. Jones	Elmendorf Farm, Inc. (Maxwell Gluck)	11/4	2:01.40	$123,500	G1
1984	Precisionist	3	Chris McCarron	L. Ross Fenstermaker	Fred W. Hooper	11/4	1:59.80	$121,300	G1
1983	Hyperborean	3	Fernando Toro	Jerry M. Fanning	Craig B. Singer	11/4	2:01.00	$97,500	G1
1982	Journey At Sea	3	Chris McCarron	L. Ross Fenstermaker	Fred W. Hooper	11/4	2:00.20	$91,300	G1
1981	Noble Nashua	3	Laffit Pincay Jr.	Jose A. Martin	Flying Zee Stable (Carl Lizza Jr. & Herbert Hochreiter)	11/4	2:01.20	$127,000	G1
1980	First Albert	3	Francisco Mena	Laz Barrera	Carmen Barrera	11/4	2:00.80	$162,200	G1
1979	Valdez	3	Laffit Pincay Jr.	Laz Barrera	Aaron U. & Marie Jones	11/4	1:59.40	$124,250	G1
1978	Radar Ahead	3	Darrel McHargue	Gary F. Jones	Sidney Vail	11/4	2:00.00	$133,300	G1
1977	J. O. Tobin	3	Bill Shoemaker	John H. Adams	El Peco Ranch (George A. Pope)	11/4	1:58.60	$194,900	G1
1976	Majestic Light	3	Sandy Hawley	John W. Russell	Ogden Mills Phipps	11/4	1:59.20	$98,200	G1
1975	Forceten	3	Donald Pierce	Neil D. Drysdale	Saron Stable	11/4	1:59.80	$119,800	G1
1974	Agitate	3	Bill Shoemaker	James R. Jimenez	Meeken Stable (John & Paula Kent Meeken)	11/4	1:59.60	$66,300	G1
