= San Juan Capistrano Stakes =

- Class: Grade III
- Location: Santa Anita Park; Arcadia, California, United States
- Inaugurated: 1935
- Race type: Thoroughbred – Flat racing
- Website: www.santaanita.com

Race information
- Distance: About 1 3/4 miles (actual distance 1 mile 1,232 yards (2.736 km))
- Surface: Turf
- Track: downhill chute, right and left-handed
- Qualification: Three-years-old & older
- Weight: Base weights with allowances: 4-year-olds and up: 126 lbs. 3-year-olds: 120 lbs.
- Purse: US$100,000 (2023)

The San Juan Capistrano Stakes is a Grade III American thoroughbred horse race for horses age three and older over a distance of 1 mile 1,232 yd (2.736 km) run on the turf track held at Santa Anita Park in Arcadia, California in June. The event currently offers a purse of $100,000. It is one of the longest graded grass races in the United States.

== History ==
The event was inaugurated on 9 March 1935, when Head Play defeated Top Row and Ladysman on a muddy track by 2 lengths in a time of 1:51 4/5 before a crowd of 45,000 on the closing day of Santa Anita meeting. In 1937 an even greater crowd came to witness Seabiscuit set a new track record for the 1 1/8 miles winning by 7 lengths. The event in 1940 only it was limited to three-year-olds and for three-year-olds and older in all other years prior to 1968.

From its inception through 1953, the race was contested on dirt, then in 1954 it was converted to a turf event.

The San Juan Capistrano is run around four turns, and begins at the top of Santa Anita's downhill chute, normally used for 6 1/2-furlong sprint races. From the start point, horses begin their descent down the hill. Within the first two furlongs of the race, horses turn right – one of only two locations in North American horse racing that a right turn is used (the other is at Kentucky Downs). After a brief straight run, there is a gentle turn to the left until the horses cross the dirt course and enter the main turf oval. Horses then run one full lap of the turf course to complete the 1 mile 1,232 yards (2.736 km) distance. In 2016 the Santa Anita's downhill chute was under repair, and the race was run on the flat turf oval, at 1 7/8 miles.

In 1964, the San Juan Capistrano Handicap was run in two divisions.

In 1965 it became an invitational event and was named the San Juan Capistrano Invitational Handicap.

With the increasing emphasis on speed horses bred to compete in the Kentucky Derby and Breeders' Cup Classic distance of 1 1/4 miles on dirt, during the last two decades longer races run on grass or dirt in North America have been in decline. Once a Grade I event, the about 1 3/4 miles San Juan Capistrano Invitational Handicap now holds a Grade III classification. Since 2007, the winner of the San Juan Capistrano has received ballot-free entry into Australia's greatest horse race and the staying championship of the world, the Melbourne Cup. Since 2008, no San Juan Capistrano winner has made the trip to Flemington for the Melbourne Cup.

The event was downgraded to a Grade II in 2004 and to a Grade III race in 2015.

The event for many runnings was held on the closing day of the Santa Anita spring meeting, which was in April. However, with the takeover of events from the close of Hollywood Park Racetrack in 2013, the event has been held in June, with three-year-olds allowed to enter.

At age eight, Niarkos (1968), Mashkour (1991) and Gold Phoenix (2026) are the oldest horses to win the event.

Two mares have won the event, La Zanzara (1975) and the Champion Argentine mare Miss Grillo (1949).

The event had showcased many a champion and notable runnings. In 1950 the Irish-bred champion Noor defeated the 1948 Triple Crown champion Citation by a neck before a crowd of about 60,000.

The March 12, 1966, edition of the San Juan Capistrano Invitational Handicap was seen by 60,792 fans, the largest crowd of the season, who turned out to say farewell to retiring U.S. Racing Hall of Fame jockey Johnny Longden. Without ever using the whip as he always did, Longden guided Canadian bred George Royal from fifteen lengths back in last place to a photo-finish win.

== Records ==
Speed record:

- 1 3/4 miles: 2:42.96 – Bienamado (2001)
- 1 3/4 miles Downhill turf: 2:48.08 – Planetario (BRZ) (2023)

Note: The 2023 San Juan Capistrano won by Planetario (BRZ) in 2:48.08 is also recognized as a speed record. According to Equibase, two course records are listed at Santa Anita for the about 1 3/4 mile distance: a Turf course record (Bienamado's 2001 win) and a Downhill Turf course record (Planetario's 2023 win).

Margins:

- 7 lengths – Fly Till Dawn (1992)
- 7 lengths – Lehmi Gold (1982)
- 7 lengths – Seabiscuit (1937)

Most wins:

- 2 – Mioland (1940, 1941)
- 2 – Intent (1952, 1953)
- 2 – George Royal (1965, 1966)
- 2 – Niarkos (1967, 1968)
- 2 – T. H. Approval (2005, 2006)
- 2 – Bourbon Bay (2010, 2012)
- 2 – Acclimate (2019, 2021)
- 2 - Planetario (BRZ) (2023, 2024)

Most wins by a jockey:

- 5 – Johnny Longden (1950, 1951, 1955, 1965, 1966)
- 5 – Bill Shoemaker (1961, 1962, 1970, 1971, 1978)

Most wins by a trainer:

- 14 – Charles Whittingham (1957, 1959, 1970, 1971, 1972, 1975, 1978, 1981, 1983, 1984, 1985, 1986, 1987, 1989)

Most wins by an owner:

- 4 – Charles S. Howard (1937, 1940, 1941, 1950)

== Winners ==
| Year | Winner | Age | Jockey | Trainer | Owner | Distance | Time | Purse | Grade | Ref |
|---|---|---|---|---|---|---|---|---|---|---|
San Juan Capistrano Stakes
| 2026 | Gold Phoenix (IRE) | 8 | Hector Isaac Berrios | Philip D'Amato | Agave Racing Stable, Little Red Feather Racing, Sterling Stables, Marsha Naify | abt. 1 3/4 miles | 2:44.76 | $100,000 | III | |
| 2025 | Nitti (IRE) | 4 | Armando Ayuso | Leonard Powell | Innergy Racing Corp, Zephyr Racing LLC and Sonny Pais | abt. 1 3/4 miles | 2:45.94 | $100,000 | III | |
| 2024 | Planetario (BRZ) | 6 | Hector Berrios | Richard Mandella | Red Rafa Stud | abt. 1 3/4 miles | 2:46.95 | $100,500 | III | |
| 2023 | Planetario (BRZ) | 5 | Hector Berrios | Richard Mandella | Red Rafa Stud | abt. 1 3/4 miles | 2:48.08 | $100,500 | III | |
| 2022 | Breakpoint (CHI) | 5 | Tyler Baze | Neil Drysdale | Don Alberto Stable | abt. 1 3/4 miles | 2:47.32 | $126,500 | III | |
| 2021 | Acclimate | 7 | Ricardo Gonzalez | Philip D'Amato | The Ellwood Johnston Trust, Timmy Time Racing LLC, Ken Tevelde | abt. 1 3/4 miles | 2:49.74 | $100,500 | III | |
| 2020 | Red King | 6 | Umberto Rispoli | Philip D'Amato | Little Red Feather Racing, Gordon Jacobsen & Philip Belmonte | abt. 1 3/4 miles | 2:46.67 | $101,500 | III | |
| 2019 | Acclimate | 5 | Martin Garcia | Philip D'Amato | The Ellwood Johnston Trust & Timmy Time Racing | abt. 1 3/4 miles | 2:48.80 | $100,702 | III | |
| 2018 | Nessy | 5 | Mike E. Smith | Ian R. Wilkes | Sierra Farm | abt. 1 3/4 miles | 2:50.82 | $100,690 | III | |
| 2017 | Inordinate | 5 | Corey Nakatani | Richard Baltas | Paymaster Racing, LLC | abt. 1 3/4 miles | 2:55.56 | $100,345 | III | |
| 2016 | Quick Casablanca (CHI) | 8 | Tyler Baze | Ron McAnally | Pablo G mez | 1 7/8 miles | 3:19.58 | $100,690 | III | |
| 2015 | Crucero | 5 | Kent J. Desormeaux | J. Keith Desormeaux | Big Chief Racing | abt. 1 3/4 miles | 2:49.46 | $150,500 | III | |
| 2014 | Big Kick | 5 | Victor Espinoza | Michael Machowsky | Ernest Marchosky, Ken Shaw, Kate Walters, Lo Hi Stable, John Mendenhall | abt. 1 3/4 miles | 2:46.78 | $200,500 | II | |
San Juan Capistrano Handicap
| 2013 | Interaction (ARG) | 7 | Joseph Talamo | Ron McAnally | Pozo de Luna | abt. 1 3/4 miles | 2:44.89 | $150,250 | II | |
| 2012 | Bourbon Bay | 6 | Joel Rosario | Neil D. Drysdale | David & Jill Heerensperger | abt. 1 3/4 miles | 2:45.70 | $150,000 | II | |
San Juan Capistrano Invitational Handicap
| 2011 | Juniper Pass | 4 | Rafael Bejarano | Thomas Ray Bell II | Betty & Robert Irvin | abt. 1 3/4 miles | 2:47.74 | $150,000 | II | |
| 2010 | Bourbon Bay | 4 | Rafael Bejarano | Neil D. Drysdale | Jill Heerensperger | abt. 1 3/4 miles | 2:44.52 | $150,000 | II | |
| 2009 | Midships | 4 | Victor Espinoza | Robert J. Frankel | Juddmonte Farms | abt. 1 3/4 miles | 2:49.26 | $196,000 | II | |
| 2008 | Big Booster | 7 | Rafael Bejarano | Michael R. Mitchell | Scott & Wayne Anastasi & James Ukegawa | abt. 1 3/4 miles | 2:45.50 | $250,000 | II | |
| 2007 | On the Acorn (GB) | 6 | Victor Espinoza | Michael R. Mitchell | Indizguys Stable | abt. 1 3/4 miles | 2:48.02 | $250,000 | II | |
| 2006 | T. H. Approval | 5 | Alex O. Solis | Eduardo Inda | Tadahiro Hotehama | abt. 1 3/4 miles | 2:45.29 | $250,000 | II | |
| 2005 | T. H. Approval | 4 | René R. Douglas | Eduardo Inda | Tadahiro Hotehama | abt. 1 3/4 miles | 2:45.02 | $250,000 | II | |
| 2004 | Meteor Storm (GB) | 5 | Jose Valdivia Jr. | Wallace Dollase | Michael Jarvis, Gary Margolis, Ken Smole, et al. | abt. 1 3/4 miles | 2:45.98 | $250,000 | II | |
| 2003 | Passinetti | 7 | Brice Blanc | Ben D. A. Cecil | Gary A. Tanaka | abt. 1 3/4 miles | 2:46.97 | $400,000 | I | |
| 2002 | Ringaskiddy | 6 | Eddie Delahoussaye | Juan J. Garcia | Juan J. Garcia & Leonard L. Scofield | abt. 1 3/4 miles | 2:44.49 | $400,000 | I | |
| 2001 | Bienamado | 5 | Chris McCarron | J. Paco Gonzalez | Trudy McCaffery, John Toffan & Robert Sangster | abt. 1 3/4 miles | 2:42.96 | $400,000 | I | |
| 2000 | Sunshine Street | 5 | Jerry D. Bailey | Neil D. Drysdale | Pat Garvey | abt. 1 3/4 miles | 2:49.06 | $400,000 | I | |
| 1999 | § Single Empire (IRE) | 5 | Kent J. Desormeaux | Neil D. Drysdale | Robert Sangster & Gary A. Tanaka | abt. 1 3/4 miles | 2:45.93 | $400,000 | I | |
| 1998 | Amerique | 4 | Eddie Delahoussaye | Ron McAnally | VHW Stables | abt. 1 3/4 miles | 2:47.08 | $400,000 | I | |
| 1997 | Marlin | 4 | Eddie Delahoussaye | D. Wayne Lukas | Michael Tabor | abt. 1 3/4 miles | 2:44.56 | $400,000 | I | |
| 1996 | Raintrap (GB) | 6 | Alex O. Solis | Robert J. Frankel | Juddmonte Farms | abt. 1 3/4 miles | 2:46.40 | $400,000 | I | |
| 1995 | Red Bishop | 7 | Mike E. Smith | Saeed bin Suroor | Godolphin Racing | abt. 1 3/4 miles | 2:48.02 | $400,000 | I | |
| 1994 | Bien Bien | 5 | Chris McCarron | J. Paco Gonzalez | Trudy McCaffery & John Toffan | abt. 1 3/4 miles | 2:46.69 | $400,000 | I | |
| 1993 | Kotashaan (FR) | 5 | Kent J. Desormeaux | Richard E. Mandella | La Presle Farm | abt. 1 3/4 miles | 2:45.00 | $400,000 | I | |
| 1992 | Fly Till Dawn | 6 | Pat Valenzuela | Darrell Vienna | Josephine T. Gleis | abt. 1 3/4 miles | 2:46.53 | $500,000 | I | |
| 1991 | Mashkour | 8 | Chris McCarron | Robert J. Frankel | Dale & Morley Engleson | abt. 1 3/4 miles | 2:47.60 | $500,000 | I | |
| 1990 | Delegant | 6 | Kent J. Desormeaux | Michael C. Whittingham | Evergreen Farm | ‡ 1 3/4 miles | 2:46.60 | $500,000 | I | |
| 1989 | Nasr El Arab | 4 | Pat Valenzuela | Charles E. Whittingham | Sheikh Mohammed | ‡ 1 3/4 miles | 2:51.40 | $400,000 | I | |
San Juan Capistrano Handicap
| 1988 | Great Communicator | 5 | Ray Sibille | Thad Ackel | Class Act Stable (George Ackel) | ‡ 1 3/4 miles | 2:51.60 | $400,000 | I | |
| 1987 | § Rosedale | 4 | Laffit Pincay Jr. | Charles E. Whittingham | Nelson Bunker Hunt | ‡ 1 3/4 miles | 2:49.00 | $400,000 | I | |
San Juan Capistrano Invitational Handicap
| 1986 | § Dahar | 5 | Alex O. Solis | Charles E. Whittingham | Summa Stable | abt. 1 3/4 miles | 2:48.20 | $400,000 | I | |
| 1985 | Prince True | 4 | Chris McCarron | Charles E. Whittingham | Mrs. Howard B. Keck | 1 3/4 miles | 2:47.80 | $300,000 | I | |
| 1984 | Load the Cannons | 4 | Laffit Pincay Jr. | Charles E. Whittingham | Summa Stable | 1 3/4 miles | 2:48.00 | $300,000 | I | |
| 1983 | Erins Isle (IRE) | 5 | Laffit Pincay Jr. | Charles E. Whittingham | Brian Sweeney | 1 3/4 miles | 2:48.60 | $300,000 | I | |
| 1982 | Lemhi Gold | 4 | Walter Guerra | Laz Barrera | Aaron U. Jones | 1 3/4 miles | 2:45.60 | $300,000 | I | |
| 1981 | § Obraztsovy | 6 | Pat Valenzuela | Charles E. Whittingham | Pascoe III & Sweeney | 1 3/4 miles | 2:50.40 | $200,000 | I | |
| 1980 | John Henry | 5 | Darrel McHargue | Ron McAnally | Dotsam Stable | 1 3/4 miles | 2:46.80 | $200,000 | I | |
| 1979 | Tiller | 5 | Ángel Cordero Jr. | David A. Whiteley | William Haggin Perry | 1 3/4 miles | 2:48.00 | $200,000 | I | |
| 1978 | Exceller | 5 | Bill Shoemaker | Charles E. Whittingham | Belair Stud Ltd. & Nelson Bunker Hunt | 1 3/4 miles | 2:51.00 | $200,000 | I | |
| 1977 | Properantes | 4 | Darrel McHargue | A. Thomas Doyle | Jacqueline Getty, Peter Richards & Michael Riordan | 1 3/4 miles | 2:47.60 | $150,000 | I | |
| 1976 | One On The Aisle | 4 | Sandy Hawley | J. Elliott Burch | Rokeby Stable | 1 3/4 miles | 2:50.00 | $125,000 | I | |
| 1975 | La Zanzara (IRE) | 5 | Donald Pierce | Charles Whittingham | Aaron U. Jones | abt. 1 3/4 miles | 2:52.20 | $125,000 | I | |
| 1974 | Astray | 5 | Jacinto Vásquez | David A. Whiteley | William Haggin Perry | abt. 1 3/4 miles | 2:45.40 | $125,000 | I | |
| 1973 | Queen's Hustler | 4 | Rudy Rosales | Gene Cleveland | Laguna Seca & Ward | abt. 1 3/4 miles | 2:46.40 | $125,000 | I | |
| 1972 | Practicante (ARG) | 6 | Laffit Pincay Jr. | Charles Whittingham | Claiborne Farm | abt. 1 3/4 miles | 2:45.60 | $125,000 | | |
| 1971 | Cougar II (CHI) | 5 | Bill Shoemaker | Charles Whittingham | Mary F. Jones | abt. 1 3/4 miles | 2:46.20 | $125,000 | | |
| 1970 | § Fiddle Isle | 5 | Bill Shoemaker | Charles Whittingham | Howard B. Keck | abt. 1 3/4 miles | 2:46.40 | $125,000 | | Dead heat |
| 1970 | Quicken Tree | 7 | Fernando Alvarez | William T. Canney | Louis R. Rowan & Wheelock Whitney Jr. | abt. 1 3/4 miles | 2:46.40 | $125,000 | | Dead heat |
| 1969 | Petrone (FR) | 5 | Johnny Sellers | Robert L. Wheeler | Flag Is Up Farms & Eddie Constantine | abt. 1 3/4 miles | 2:47.40 | $125,000 | | |
| 1968 | Niarkos (ARG) | 8 | Álvaro Pineda | Johnny Adams | Hasty House Farm | abt. 1 3/4 miles | 2:47.80 | $125,000 | | |
| 1967 | Niarkos (ARG) | 7 | Álvaro Pineda | Johnny Adams | Hasty House Farm | abt. 1 3/4 miles | 2:50.20 | $125,000 | | |
| 1966 | George Royal (CAN) | 5 | Johnny Longden | Donald Richardson | Robert W. Hall & Ernest Hammond | abt. 1 3/4 miles | 2:48.80 | $125,000 | | |
| 1965 | George Royal (CAN) | 4 | Johnny Longden | S. George Dunn | Robert W. Hall & Ernest Hammond | abt. 1 3/4 miles | 2:46.80 | $125,000 | | |
San Juan Capistrano Handicap
| 1964 | Cedar Key | 4 | Manuel Ycaza | Don McCoy | Jerry Basta | abt. 1 3/4 miles | 2:48.00 | $86,850 | | Division 1 |
| 1964 | Mr. Consistency | 6 | Kenneth Church | James I. Nazworthy | Mrs. Ann Peppers | abt. 1 3/4 miles | 2:49.00 | $87,850 | | Division 2 |
| 1963 | Pardao (GB) | 5 | Ismael Valenzuela | William J. Hirsch | Ray Bell (Lessee) | abt. 1 3/4 miles | 2:48.20 | $115,600 | | |
| 1962 | § Olden Times | 4 | Bill Shoemaker | Mesh Tenney | Rex C. Ellsworth | abt. 1 3/4 miles | 2:53.00 | $118,000 | | |
| 1961 | Don't Alibi | 5 | Bill Shoemaker | Matthew Dragna | Joe Dragna, Matthew Dragna & Edward Santoro | abt. 1 3/4 miles | 2:48.00 | $113,100 | | |
| 1960 | Amerigo (GB) | 5 | William Hartack | Harris Brown | Mrs. Tilyou Christopher | abt. 1 3/4 miles | 2:47.80 | $119,900 | | |
| 1959 | Royal Living | 4 | Ralph Neves | Charles Whittingham | Llangollen Farm | abt. 1 3/4 miles | 2:45.40 | $116,800 | | |
| 1958 | Promised Land | 4 | Ismael Valenzuela | Hirsch Jacobs | Ethel D. Jacobs | abt. 1 3/4 miles | 2:52.00 | $116,500 | | |
| 1957 | Corn Husker | 4 | Eddie Arcaro | Charles Whittingham | Llangollen Farm | abt. 1 3/4 miles | 2:55.00 | $115,500 | | |
| 1956 | § Bobby Brocato | 5 | George Taniguchi | William Molter | Mr. & Mrs. Travis M. Kerr | abt. 1 3/4 miles | 2:49.40 | $115,000 | | |
| 1955 | St. Vincent (GB) | 4 | Johnny Longden | Vance Longden | George R. Gardiner & Alberta Ranches | abt. 1 3/4 miles | 2:46.80 | $115,900 | | |
| 1954 | By Zeus | 4 | Raymond York | William J. Hirsch | Jane Greer | abt. 1 3/4 miles | 2:26.00 | $114,800 | | |
| 1953 | Intent | 5 | Eddie Arcaro | William J. Hirsch | Brookfield Farm | 1 3/4 miles | 2:55.60 | $111,200 | | |
| 1952 | Intent | 4 | Eric Guerin | William J. Hirsch | Brookfield Farm | 1 3/4 miles | 2:55.00 | $56,300 | | |
| 1951 | Be Fleet | 4 | Johnny Longden | George E. Mayberry | Andrew J. Crevolin | 1 3/4 miles | 2:56.00 | $61,400 | | |
| 1950 | Noor (IRE) | 5 | Johnny Longden | Burley Parke | Charles S. Howard | 1 3/4 miles | 2:52.80 | $64,000 | | |
| 1949 | Miss Grillo (ARG) | 7 | Johnny Adams | Horatio Luro | Mill River Stable | 1 1/2 miles | 2:29.00 | $60,600 | | |
| 1947–1948 | | Race not held | | | | | | | | |
| 1946 | Triplicate | 5 | Job Dean Jessop | Clyde Phillips | Fred Astaire | 1 1/2 miles | 2:28.40 | $57,530 | | |
| 1945 | Bric A Bac | 4 | Conn McCreary | J. H. Logan | Stanley Freeman & George Church | 1 1/2 miles | 2:29.20 | $54,340 | | |
| 1942–1944 | | Race not held | | | | | | | | |
| 1941 | Mioland | 4 | Leon Haas | Tom Smith | Charles S. Howard | 1 1/2 miles | 2:30.80 | $61,810 | | |
| 1940 | Mioland | 3 | Johnny Adams | Tom Smith | Charles S. Howard | 1 1/16 miles | 1:45.20 | $13,750 | | |
| 1939 | Cravat | 4 | Jack Westrope | Walter Burrows | Townsend. B. Martin | 1 1/2 miles | 2:30.40 | $31,200 | | |
| 1938 | Indian Broom | 5 | Harry Richards | Darrell F. Cannon | Austin C. Taylor | 1 1/8 miles | 1:51.40 | $12,700 | | |
| 1937 | Seabiscuit | 4 | Red Pollard | Tom Smith | Charles S. Howard | 1 1/8 miles | 1:48.80 | $13,200 | | |
| 1936 | § Whopper | 4 | Willie Saunders | Duval A. Headley | Hal Price Headley | 1 1/8 miles | 1:50.00 | $14,950 | | |
| 1935 | Head Play | 5 | Charles Kurtsinger | J. Thomas Taylor | Suzanne Mason | 1 1/8 miles | 1:51.40 | $13,100 | | |

Turf Dirt
Notes:
§ Ran as part of an entry
‡ Run 259 feet short of 1 3/4 miles 1997–2001

== See also ==
- List of American and Canadian Graded races

=== Other North American Marathon races ===
On dirt:

- Gallant Man Handicap
- Brooklyn Handicap
- Fort Harrod Stakes
- Tokyo City Cup
- Valedictory Stakes

On turf:

- Canadian International Stakes
- Carleton F. Burke Handicap
