= Charles Whittingham Stakes =

- Class: Grade II
- Location: Santa Anita Park; Arcadia, California, USA
- Inaugurated: 1969 as Hollywood Park Invitational Handicap at Hollywood Park
- Race type: Thoroughbred - Flat racing
- Website: santaanita.com

Race information
- Distance: 1 1/4 miles (10 furlongs)
- Surface: Turf
- Track: Left-handed
- Qualification: Three-year-olds and older
- Weight: Base weights with allowances: 4-year-olds and up: 126 lbs. 3-year-olds: 130 lbs.
- Purse: $225,000 (2022)

The Charles Whittingham Stakes is a Grade II American Thoroughbred horse race for horses age three years old and older over a distance of 1 1/4 miles on the turf held annually in late May at Santa Anita Park in Arcadia, California, USA. The event currently carries a purse of $225,000.

== History ==
The event was inaugurated in 1969 as the Hollywood Invitational Handicap over a distance of 1 1/2 miles on the turf.

The event was run at a distance of a 1 1/2 miles from 1969 to 1987 and recently 2015. From 1989 until 1998, the race was named the Hollywood Turf Handicap.

In 1999 the event was renamed to Charles Whittingham Handicap and in 2003 to Charles Whittingham Memorial Handicap in honor of the U.S. Racing Hall of Fame trainer Charlie Whittingham (1913–1999) who saddled many memorable winners at Hollywood Park and whose seven victories in the Hollywood Invitational Turf Handicap race was the most for any trainer. It had been equaled since.

In 2014 when Hollywood Park Racetrack closed the race was moved to Santa Anita Park and renamed to it current name.

Originally a Grade I event, the event was downgraded in 2013 to Grade II.

== Records ==
Time record: (at current distance of 1 1/4 miles)

- 1:57.75 - Bien Bien (1993)

Most wins:

- 3 - Acclamation (2010, 2011, 2012)
- 3 - John Henry (1980, 1981, 1984)

Most wins by an owner:

- 3 - Dotsam Stable (1980, 1981, 1984)

Most wins by a jockey:

- 6 - Gary Stevens (1991, 1992, 1994, 2003, 2015, 2017)

Most wins by a trainer:

- 7 - Charles Whittingham (1970, 1971, 1976, 1978, 1982, 1983, 1987)
- 7 - Neil Drysdale (1985, 1988, 2000, 2003, 2006, 2008, 2014)
- 7 - Robert J. Frankel (1973, 1979, 1991, 1992, 1999, 2002, 2009)

== Winners ==
| Year | Winner | Age | Jockey | Trainer | Owner | Time | Purse | Grade |
|---|---|---|---|---|---|---|---|---|
Charles Whittingham Stakes
| 2026 | Mondego (GB) | 6 | Emisael Jaramillo | Michael W. McCarthy | Cheyenne Stable | 1:59.99 | $200,000 | II |
| 2025 | Atitlan | 4 | Hector Isaac Berrios | John Shirreffs | John M. B. O'Connor | 1:59.92 | $200,000 | II |
| 2024 | Gold Phoenix (IRE) | 6 | Kyle Frey | Philip D'Amato | Little Red Feather Racing, Sterling Stables, LLC and Naify, Marsha | 2:00.91 | $200,000 | II |
| 2023 | Offlee Naughty | 5 | John R. Velazquez | Michael W. McCarthy | Daniell, James M. and Daniell, Donna | 2:02.45 | $200,500 | II |
| 2022 | Beyond Brilliant | 4 | Victor Espinoza | John Shirreffs | C R K Stable | 1:58.72 | $226,000 | II |
| 2021 | Award Winner | 5 | Juan J. Hernandez | David E. Hofmans | Amerman Racing | 1:59.27 | $194,000 | II |
| 2020 | United | 5 | Flavien Prat | Richard E. Mandella | LNJ Foxwoods | 2:00.34 | $200,500 | II |
| 2019 | Marckie's Water | 5 | T. J. Pereira | Richard Baltas | Little Red Feather Racing & Norman Tavares | 2:00.95 | $200,000 | II |
| 2018 | Itsinthepost | 6 | Julien Leparoux | Jeff Mullins | Red Baron's Barn LLC | 2:02.10 | $200,000 | II |
| 2017 | Ashleyluvssuger | 6 | Gary Stevens | Peter Eurton | Alesia, Sharon, Bran Jam Stable / Ciaglia Racing | 1:58.49 | $200,000 | II |
| 2016 | Si Sage (FR) | 6 | Mike E. Smith | James M. Cassidy | Red Baron's Barn/Rancho Temescal/Vayaconsuerte | 1:59.48 | $200,000 | II |
| 2015 | Ashleyluvssugar | 4 | Gary Stevens | Peter Eurton | Bran Jam Stable/Ciaglia Racing | 2:30.10 | $200,000 | II |
| 2014 | Fire With Fire | 6 | Tyler Baze | Neil Drysdale | David Heerensperger | 2:00.92 | $200,000 | II |
Charles Whittingham Memorial Handicap
| 2013 | Tale of a Champion | 5 | Joseph Talamo | Kristin Mulhall | Kretz Racing | 2:01.27 | $200,000 | II |
| 2012 | Acclamation | 6 | Patrick Valenzuela | Donald Warren | Peter & Mary Hilvers | 2:01.50 | $250,000 | I |
| 2011 | Acclamation | 5 | Joe Talamo | Donald Warren | Johnstons/Hilvers | 2:00.18 | $250,000 | I |
| 2010 | Acclamation | 4 | C. S. Reyes | Donald Warren | Ellwood B. & Elizabeth E. Johnston | 1:59.45 | $250,000 | I |
| 2009 | Midships | 4 | Victor Espinoza | Robert J. Frankel | Juddmonte Farms | 2:00.51 | $300,000 | I |
| 2008 | Artiste Royal | 7 | David Flores | Neil D. Drysdale | David & Jill Heerensperger | 1:59.99 | $300,000 | I |
| 2007 | After Market | 4 | Alex Solis | John Shirreffs | Pam & Martin Wygod | 1:58.77 | $300,000 | I |
| 2006 | Lava Man | 5 | Corey Nakatani | Douglas F. O'Neill | STD Racing/Jason Wood | 2:00.29 | $300,000 | I |
| 2005 | Sweet Return | 5 | Alex Solis | Ron McAnally | Red Oak Stable | 2:01.35 | $350,000 | I |
| 2004 | Sabiango | 6 | Tyler Baze | Bob Baffert | Monty Roberts | 2:01.52 | $350,000 | I |
| 2003 | Storming Home | 5 | Gary Stevens | Neil D. Drysdale | Sheikh Maktoum | 2:00.66 | $350,000 | I |
Charles Whittingham Handicap
| 2002 | Denon | 4 | Garrett Gomez | Robert J. Frankel | Edmund A. Gann | 2:01.47 | $350,000 | I |
| 2001 | Bienamado | 5 | Chris McCarron | J. Paco Gonzalez | Trudy McCaffery, John Toffan, Robert Sangster | 1:59.34 | $350,000 | I |
| 2000 | White Heart | 5 | Kent Desormeaux | Neil D. Drysdale | Sheikh Mohammed | 2:00.83 | $300,000 | I |
| 1999 | River Bay | 6 | Alex Solis | Robert J. Frankel | Chalhoub Stable | 2:00.66 | $400,000 | I |
Hollywood Turf Handicap
| 1998 | Storm Trooper | 5 | Kent Desormeaux | Henry Cecil | Prince Fahd Salman | 2:03.05 | $400,000 | I |
| 1997 | Rainbow Dancer | 6 | Alex Solis | Jenine Sahadi | Evergreen Farms | 2:00.09 | $400,000 | I |
| 1996 | Sandpit | 7 | Corey Nakatani | Richard Mandella | Sierra Thoroughbreds | 1:59.40 | $500,000 | I |
| 1995 | Earl of Barking | 5 | Goncalino Almeida | Richard L. Cross | Henry E. Pabst | 1:59.78 | $500,000 | I |
| 1994 | Grand Flotilla | 7 | Gary Stevens | Jenine Sahadi | Mike Sloan | 1:59.26 | $500,000 | I |
| 1993 | Bien Bien | 4 | Chris McCarron | J. Paco Gonzalez | Caffery & Toffan | 1:57.75 | $500,000 | I |
| 1992 | Quest for Fame | 5 | Gary Stevens | Robert J. Frankel | Juddmonte Farms | 1:58.99 | $500,000 | I |
| 1991 | Exbourne | 5 | Gary Stevens | Robert J. Frankel | Juddmonte Farms | 2:00.10 | $500,000 | I |
| 1990 | Steinlen | 7 | José A. Santos | D. Wayne Lukas | Wildenstein Stables | 2:03.00 | $500,000 | I |
| 1989 | Great Communicator | 6 | Ray Sibille | Thad Ackel | Class Act Stable (George Ackel) | 1:59.40 | $500,000 | I |
Hollywood Invitational Handicap
| 1988 | Political Ambition | 4 | Ed Delahoussaye | Neil D. Drysdale | Clover Racing Stable et al. | 1:58.60 | $300,000 | I |
| 1987 | Rivlia | 5 | Chris McCarron | Charles Whittingham | Narvick International | 2:24.20 | $300,000 | I |
| 1986 | Flying Pidgeon | 5 | Santiago Soto | Luis Olivares | C. Daparma/Flying "M" Acres | 2:27.00 | $300,000 | I |
| 1985 | Both Ends Burning | 5 | Ed Delahoussaye | Neil D. Drysdale | Burdett-Coutts & Nelson | 2:25.00 | $300,000 | I |
| 1984 | John Henry | 9 | Chris McCarron | Ron McAnally | Dotsam Stable | 2:25.00 | $300,000 | I |
| 1983 | Erins Isle | 5 | Laffit Pincay, Jr. | Charles Whittingham | Brian Sweeney | 2:25.80 | $300,000 | I |
| 1982 | Exploded | 5 | Laffit Pincay, Jr. | Charles Whittingham | Bradley/Chandler/Whittingham | 2:25.20 | $300,000 | I |
| 1981 | John Henry | 6 | Laffit Pincay, Jr. | Ron McAnally | Dotsam Stable | 2:27.80 | $200,000 | I |
| 1980 | John Henry | 5 | Darrel McHargue | Ron McAnally | Dotsam Stable | 2:25.40 | $200,000 | I |
| 1979 | Johnny's Image | 4 | Sandy Hawley | Robert J. Frankel | Edmund A. Gann & Meryl Ann Tanz | 2:25.20 | $200,000 | I |
| 1978 | Exceller | 5 | Bill Shoemaker | Charles Whittingham | Nelson Bunker Hunt | 2:25.80 | $200,000 | I |
| 1977 | Vigors | 4 | Darrel McHargue | Larry J. Sterling | William R. Hawn | 2:26.80 | $200,000 | I |
| 1976 | ¶Dahlia | 6 | Bill Shoemaker | Charles Whittingham | Nelson Bunker Hunt | 2:26.80 | $200,000 | I |
| 1975 | Barclay Joy | 5 | Tony Diaz | Tommy Doyle | Barclay Stable | 2:27.00 | | I |
| 1974 | Court Ruling | 4 | William Mahorney | W. Preston King | Milton Polinger | 2:27.60 | | I |
| 1973 | Life Cycle | 4 | Laffit Pincay, Jr. | Robert J. Frankel | Peter E. Blum | 2:25.60 | | I |
| 1972 | ¶Typecast | 6 | Jerry Lambert | Tommy Doyle | Fletcher R. Jones | 2:25.80 | | |
| 1971 | Cougar II | 5 | Bill Shoemaker | Charles Whittingham | Mary F. Jones | 2:26.40 | | |
| 1970 | Fiddle Isle | 5 | Bill Shoemaker | Charles Whittingham | Howard B. Keck | 2:25.60 | | |
| 1969 | Fort Marcy | 5 | Manuel Ycaza | J. Elliott Burch | Rokeby Stables | 2:27.20 | | |

Notes:
¶ Mare
