= Khaled Stakes =

- Class: Restricted stakes
- Location: Belmont Park; Elmont, New York, United States
- Inaugurated: 1990
- Race type: Thoroughbred – Flat racing
- Website: www.hollywoodpark.com

Race information
- Distance: 1 1/8 miles (9 furlongs)
- Surface: Turf
- Track: Left-handed
- Qualification: Four-years-old & up, bred in California
- Weight: 124 lbs. + allowances
- Purse: US$150,000

The Khaled Stakes was an American Thoroughbred horse race held annually at Hollywood Park Racetrack in Inglewood, California. Sponsored by the TVG Network, the race is contested on turf over a distance of one and one-eighth miles (nine furlongs). The event is restricted to horses age four years and older who were bred in State of California.

Part of the California Gold Rush Day program at Hollywood Park Racetrack, the Khaled Stakes was run as the male counterpart to the Fran's Valentine Stakes for mares.

Distances:

- 1 1/16 miles : 1990–2002
- 1 1/8 miles 2003–present

== Historical notes ==
In winning his second Khaled Stakes in 2002, nine-year-old Native Desert joined John Henry as the oldest horse ever to win a stakes race at Hollywood Park.

== Records ==
Speed record: (at current distance of 1 1/8 miles)

- 1:44.26 – Lava Man (2006)

Most wins:

- 2 – Journalism (1994, 1995)
- 2 – Native Desert (1998, 2002)
- 2 – Spinelessjellyfish (2000, 2001)

== Winners since 1998 ==
Year	Winner	Age	Jockey	Trainer	Owner	Time
2009	Unusual Smoke	4	Martin Garcia	A.C. Avila	Santa Ines Stable	1:47.28
2008	Mr. Wolverine	6	Michael Baze	Jorge Gutierrez	John E. Begue, Bill Dreyfus, & Venneri Racing	1:48.51
2007	Epic Power	6	Corey Nakatani	Jack Carava	La Canada Stables, LLC	1:47.40
2006	Lava Man	5	Corey Nakatani	Douglas F. O'Neill	STD Racing & Jason Wood	1:44.26
2005	Running Free	4	Victor Espinoza	Kristin Mulhall	Southern Nevada Racing Stables	1:48.00
2004	Black Bart	5	Sandi Gann	Troy Bainum	Tom Metzger	1:47.68
2003	Sea to See	5	Alex Solis	Douglas F. O'Neill	Soares & Suarez	1:47.60
2002	Native Desert	9	Eddie Delahoussaye	Juan Garcia	Miguel Rubio	1:41.80
2001	Spinelessjellyfish	5	Chris McCarron	Jenine Sahadi	Stephen Sahadi et al.	1:40.77
2000	Spinelessjellyfish	4	Chris McCarron	Jenine Sahadi	Stephen Sahadi et al.	1:39.40
1999	Del Mar Gray	4	Alex Solis	Bob Baffert	Ed & Natalie Friendly	nf
1998	Native Desert	5	René Douglas	Juan Garcia	Miguel Rubio	1:40.80

== Earlier winners ==
- 1997 – Gastown
- 1996 – no race
- 1995 – Journalism
- 1994 – Journalism
- 1993 – Patriotaki
- 1992 – Blaze O'Brien
- 1991 – C Sam Maggio
- 1990 – River Master
