= Game Winner =

American-bred Thoroughbred racehorse

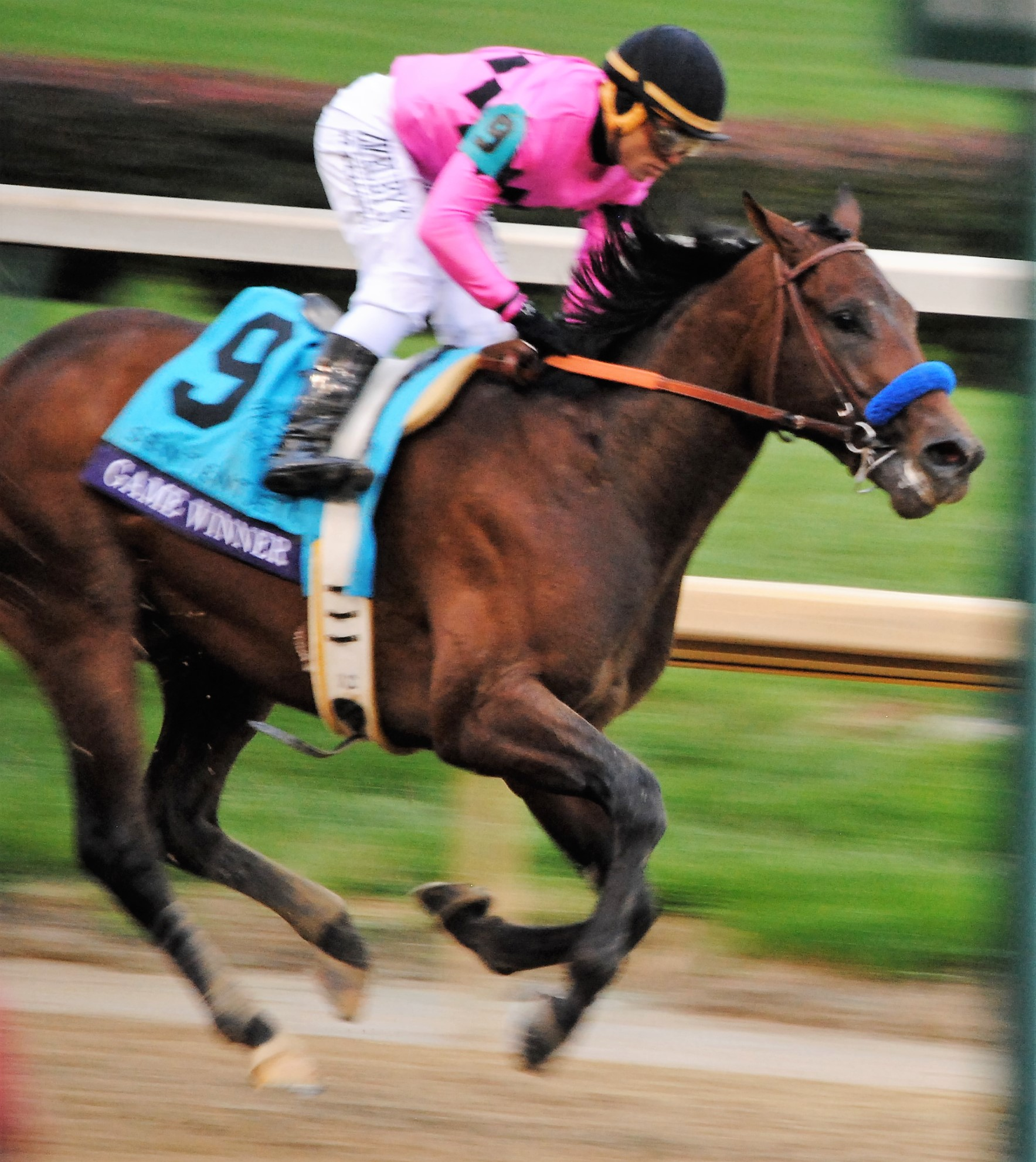
- Game Winner at the 2018 Breeders' Cup
- Sire: Candy Ride (ARG)
- Grandsire: Ride the Rails
- Dam: Indyan Giving
- Damsire: A.P. Indy
- Sex: Colt
- Foaled: March 6, 2016
- Country: United States
- Colour: Bay
- Breeder: Summer Wind Equine
- Owner: Gary and Mary West
- Trainer: Bob Baffert
- Record: 8: 5-2-0
- Earnings: $2,027,500

Major wins
- Del Mar Futurity (2018); American Pharoah Stakes (2018); Los Alamitos Derby (2019) Breeders' Cup wins: Breeders' Cup Juvenile (2018)
- Last updated on July 14, 2019

Game Winner (foaled March 6, 2016) is an American Thoroughbred racehorse who was the champion two-year-old colt of 2018. He was undefeated in four starts at age two, including wins in the Del Mar Futurity, American Pharoah Stakes and Breeders' Cup Juvenile. He started his three-year-old campaign with second-place finishes in both the Rebel Stakes and Santa Anita Derby before finishing fifth in the 2019 Kentucky Derby. After a brief layoff, he returned in July to win the Los Alamitos Derby.

== Background ==
Game Winner is a bay colt who was bred in Kentucky by Summer Wind Equine, owned by Jane Lyon. His sire Candy Ride was undefeated in seven starts in Argentina and the United States, and has had growing success as a breeding stallion. Candy Ride's most successful offspring include Horse of the Year Gun Runner and champion Shared Belief. Game Winner's dam Indyan Giving was an unraced daughter of leading sire A.P. Indy, out of champion older mare Fleet Indian. The family traces back to influential broodmare La Troienne. Indyan Giving died due to colic just three months after foaling Game Winner.

Game Winner was purchased as a yearling for $110,000, a relative bargain considering his breeding, at the Keeneland 2017 September Sales by Gary and Mary West. He failed to attract much attention at the sale due to a problem with one of his feet, since corrected by shoeing. He is trained by Bob Baffert.

== Racing career ==
=== 2018: two-year-old season ===
Game Winner earned a "Rising Star" designation from the Thoroughbred Daily News for his performance in his first start on August 18, 2018, at Del Mar, a six-furlong maiden special weight race. Drawing the outside post position in a field of nine, he was carried wide around the turn while contesting the early pace. He assumed the lead around as they entered the stretch and continued to draw away, winning by 5 3/4 lengths.

Sixteen days later, Game Winner made his graded stakes debut in the Del Mar Futurity on September 3, run over a distance of seven furlongs. He was the 8-5 second choice in the field of six, in which the favorite, Roadster, was also trained by Baffert. The stablemates rated five lengths behind the fast early pace set by Rowayton, then made their moves on the final turn. Roadster could not match Game Winner's acceleration and finished third, while Game Winner pulled by Rowayton in the final furlong to win by 1 1/2 lengths. Baffert commented, "I knew coming in that (Game Winner) was coming back a little quick, but he's a big, strong, heavy horse, and I knew he could handle it. I'd rather run him again than keep working him."

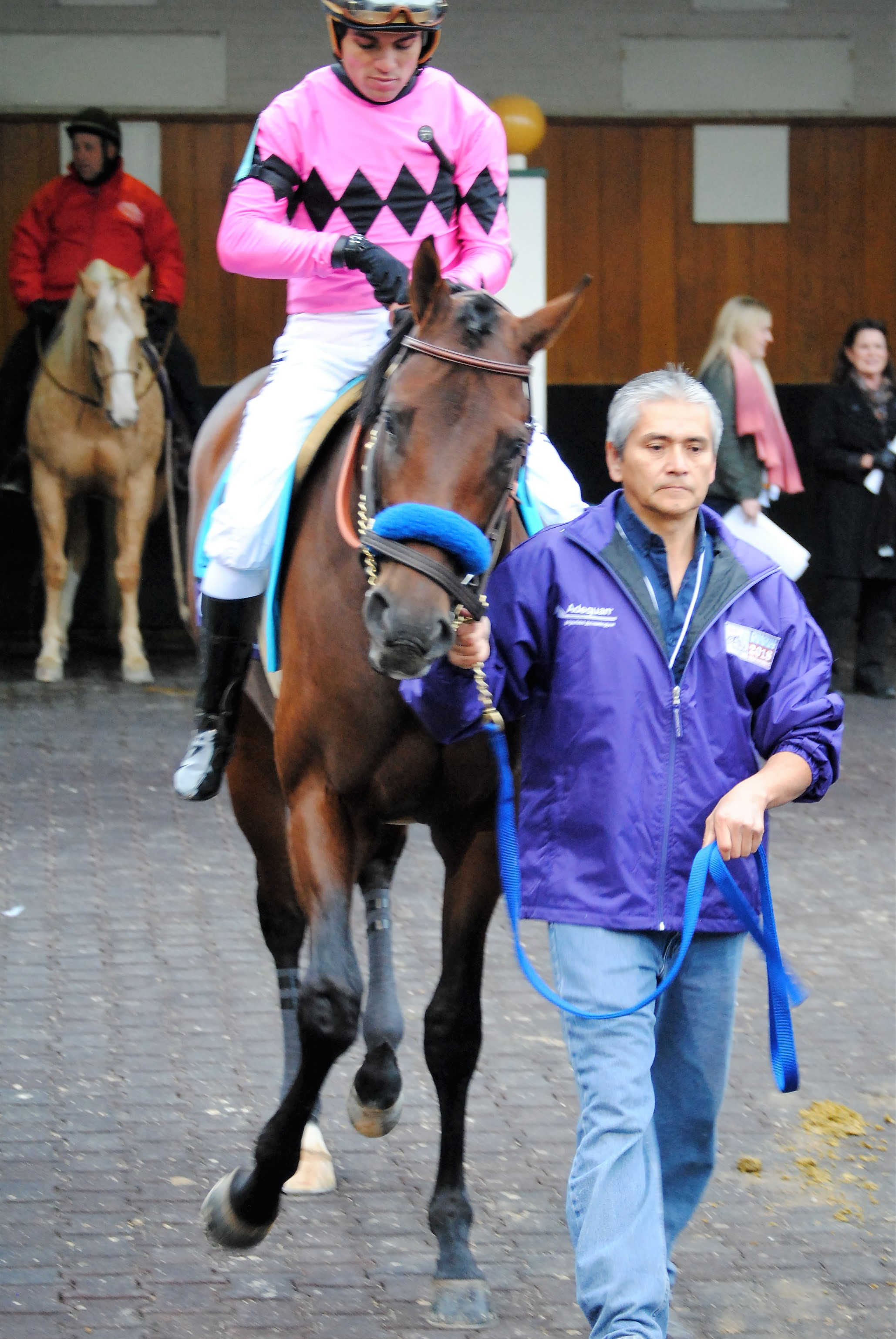
Game Winner with groom Eduardo Luna and jockey Joel Rosario at the 2018 Breeders' Cup

Game Winner made his next start in the American Pharoah Stakes on September 29, going off as the 3-10 favorite in a field of five. He pressed the early pace set by Rowayton, then moved to the lead around the far turn and pulled away in the final furlong for a 4 1/2 lengths. It was Baffert's eighth win in the race formerly known as the FrontRunner Stakes and renamed for Baffert's Triple Crown winner American Pharoah. "[Game Winner] tipped us off this summer that he was going to be a good one. He is strong and he still looks a little heavy," said Baffert. "I don't plan to do too much with him before the Breeders' Cup. The good ones get there. I was very happy to win the first American Pharoah. Pretty cool and nice of Santa Anita to name a race after him. We had the same groom on this horse as American Pharoah [Eduardo Luna]."

The win established Game Winner as an early favorite for the 2019 Kentucky Derby. Sportswriter Steve Haskin cited the colt's flexible running style (having won from both on and off the pace), his superior breeding, and Baffert's recent successes with Arrogate and Justify in addition to American Pharoah.

Fourteen horses were entered in the Breeders' Cup Juvenile on November 2, held in 2018 at Churchill Downs. However, the highly regarded Code of Honor was scratched after developing a fever, leaving thirteen to go to post with Game Winner as the even-money favorite. Game Winner was bumped at the start, then settled in mid-pack while being carried wide around the first turn. He continued to race wide down the backstretch, then started his move on the final turn. Meanwhile, longshot Knicks Go pressed the early pace and moved to the lead at the head of the stretch. Game Winner gradually made up ground despite bumping with Knicks Go in midstretch and pulled away late to win by 2 1/4 lengths. "He broke fine, but it looked like they took my spot, and I had to go wide," said jockey Joel Rosario. "He seemed like he didn't mind that. He was comfortable. That's why we got him moving at that point, instead of getting inside and taking back. Turning for home, the more I rode him, the more he gave it to me."

=== 2019: three-year-old campaign ===
Game Winner was supposed to make his three-year-old debut in the San Felipe Stakes on March 9, 2019, but that race was cancelled due to the temporary closure of Santa Anita. Instead, he was shipped to Oaklawn Park for the Rebel Stakes a week later. Due to the large number of entries, the Rebel was split into two races, with Game Winner going off as the favorite in the second division. At the break, he bumped with Jersey Agenda to his inside and fell back to sixth place. Down the backstretch, he remained in sixth and was just over three lengths behind the pacesetter, Omaha Beach. Around the final turn, Game Winner commenced his drive and moved into second while racing four wide. Omaha Beach re-opened a two-length advantage in mid-stretch, but Game Winner started closing again. Omaha Beach fought back and won by a nose despite being bumped by Game Winner near the wire.

On April 6, shortly after Santa Anita was re-opened for racing, Game Winner entered the Santa Anita Derby. He went off as the favorite in a field of six, with the second choice being stablemate Roadster. Game Winner raced four-wide around the first turn and backstretch, then started his move on the far turn while racing three wide. He briefly moved to the lead in mid-stretch but could not match the closing kick of Roadster, who had saved ground along the rail throughout the race. Game Winner finished second, beaten by half a length.

"At the eighth pole, I knew I was going to win — I just didn't know which one," said Baffert. "We've just got to keep them happy and healthy, enjoy the ride, the moment. It's hard to get to this moment. There's not a better feeling than there was today."

In the 2019 Kentucky Derby, Game Winner went off as one of the favorites in a field of nineteen. However, he was bumped shortly after the start of the race and dropped far behind the early leaders. Racing wide around both turns, he made a strong run to finish sixth. He was subsequently promoted to fifth place after the disqualification of Maximum Security for interference with other horses.

Game Winner did not enter the 2019 Preakness Stakes, and in late May, Baffert ruled him out of running in the 2019 Belmont Stakes. It was later revealed that the colt was suffering from a bad back, from which he was given some time off to recover. He returned to the racecourse on July 13 in the Los Alamitos Derby, winning by five lengths as the 1-20 favorite.

== Statistics ==
Date	Age	Distance	Race	Grade	Track	Odds	Field	Finish	Winning Time	Winning (Losing) Margin	Jockey	Ref
Aug 18, 2018	2	6 furlongs	Maiden Special Weight	Maiden	Del Mar	1.90	9	1	1:11.21	5 3/4 lengths	Joel Rosario	
Sep 3, 2018	2	7 furlongs	Del Mar Futurity	I	Del Mar	1.60	6	1	1:23.18	1 1/2 lengths	Mario Gutierrez	
Sep 29, 2018	2	1 1/16 miles	American Pharoah Stakes	I	Santa Anita Park	0.30*	5	1	1:43.77	4 1/2 lengths	Joel Rosario	
Nov 2, 2018	2	1 1/16 miles	Breeders' Cup Juvenile	I	Churchill Downs	1.00*	13	1	1:43.67	2 1/4 lengths	Joel Rosario	
Mar 16, 2019	3	1 1/16 miles	Rebel Stakes	II	Oaklawn Park	0.50*	10	2	1:42.42	(nose)	Joel Rosario	
Apr 6, 2019	3	1 1/8 miles	Santa Anita Derby	I	Santa Anita	0.50*	6	2	1:51.28	(1/2 length)	Joel Rosario	
May 4, 2019	3	1 1/4 miles	Kentucky Derby	I	Churchill Downs	6.80	19	5	2:03.93	(3 1/4 lengths)	Joel Rosario	
Jul 13, 2019	3	1 1/8 miles	Los Alamitos Derby	III	Los Alamitos	0.05	5	1	1:48.30	5 lengths	Joel Rosario	

An asterisk after the odds means Game Winner was the post-time favorite.

== Stud career ==
In 2024 Game Winner stood for a stud fee of $20,000 at Lane's End near Versailles, Kentucky. His son Gaming won the Grade I Del Mar Futurity in 2024, an event Game Winner won as a juvenile.

=== Notable progeny ===
c = colt, f = filly, g = gelding

Foaled	Name	Sex	Major Wins
2022	Gaming	c	Del Mar Futurity

== Pedigree ==
Pedigree of Game Winner, bay colt, 2016
Sire Candy Ride (ARG) 1999 bay	Ride the Rails; 1991 dark bay	Cryptoclearance	Fappiano
Sire Candy Ride (ARG) 1999 bay	Ride the Rails; 1991 dark bay	Cryptoclearance	Naval Orange
Sire Candy Ride (ARG) 1999 bay	Ride the Rails; 1991 dark bay	Herbalesian	Herbager
Sire Candy Ride (ARG) 1999 bay	Ride the Rails; 1991 dark bay	Herbalesian	Alanesian
Sire Candy Ride (ARG) 1999 bay	Candy Girl (ARG); 1990 chestnut	Candy Stripes	Blushing Groom (FR)
Sire Candy Ride (ARG) 1999 bay	Candy Girl (ARG); 1990 chestnut	Candy Stripes	Bubble Company (FR)
Sire Candy Ride (ARG) 1999 bay	Candy Girl (ARG); 1990 chestnut	City Girl	Farnesio (ARG)
Sire Candy Ride (ARG) 1999 bay	Candy Girl (ARG); 1990 chestnut	City Girl	Cithara
Dam Indyan Giving 2009 dark bay	A.P. Indy; 1989 dark bay	Seattle Slew	Bold Reasoning
Dam Indyan Giving 2009 dark bay	A.P. Indy; 1989 dark bay	Seattle Slew	My Charmer
Dam Indyan Giving 2009 dark bay	A.P. Indy; 1989 dark bay	Weekend Surprise	Secretariat
Dam Indyan Giving 2009 dark bay	A.P. Indy; 1989 dark bay	Weekend Surprise	Lassie Dear
Dam Indyan Giving 2009 dark bay	Fleet Indian; 2001 dark bay	Indian Charlie	In Excess (IRE)
Dam Indyan Giving 2009 dark bay	Fleet Indian; 2001 dark bay	Indian Charlie	Soviet Sojourn
Dam Indyan Giving 2009 dark bay	Fleet Indian; 2001 dark bay	Hustleeta	Afleet
Dam Indyan Giving 2009 dark bay	Fleet Indian; 2001 dark bay	Hustleeta	Bravo Native (family: 1-x)
