= Came Home =

American-bred Thoroughbred racehorse

- Sire: Gone West
- Grandsire: Mr. Prospector
- Dam: Nice Assay
- Damsire: Clever Trick
- Sex: Stallion
- Foaled: March 29, 1999
- Died: July 8, 2021 (age 22)
- Country: United States
- Colour: Dark Bay/Brown
- Breeder: John Toffan
- Owner: John Toffan & Trudy McCaffery / W. S. Farish III & John Goodman
- Trainer: J. Paco Gonzalez
- Record: 12: 9-0-0
- Earnings: US$1,835,940

Major wins
- Hopeful Stakes (2001); Hollywood Juvenile Championship (2001); San Vicente Stakes (2002); Santa Anita Derby (2002); Pacific Classic Stakes (2002); Swaps Stakes (2002); San Rafael Stakes (2002); Affirmed Handicap (2002)

Came Home (March 29, 1999 – July 8, 2021) was an American Thoroughbred racehorse. He was sired by Gone West, who was recently pensioned at Mill Ridge Farm. Came Home was out of the graded-stakes-winning mare Nice Assay.

Came Home got his name after a series of failed attempts in the sales ring; thus, he was always coming home. One of these sales attempts included Came Home getting spooked and falling down. According to witnesses, the colt got right back up again as though nothing had happened.

== Racing career ==
Some of his victories included the Hopeful Stakes (Gr. 1) and the Hollywood Juvenile Championship Stakes (Gr. 3) at the age of two years.

At three, he won the Pacific Classic Stakes (Gr. 1), the Santa Anita Derby (Gr. 1), the Swaps Stakes (Gr. 2), the San Rafael Stakes (Gr. 2), the San Vicente Stakes (Gr. 2), and the Affirmed Handicap (Gr. 3)

== At Stud ==
Came Home stood the first part of his stud career at Lane's End Farm in Lexington, Kentucky but was shipped to Japan's Shizunai Stallion Station in 2008, where he remained until his death from colic on July 8, 2021.

=== Notable stock ===
c = colt, f = filly, g = gelding

Foaled	Name	Sex	Major Wins
2014	Inti	c	February Stakes
