= Purple Violet Stakes =

- Class: Restricted stakes
- Location: Arlington Park; Arlington Heights, Illinois, United States
- Inaugurated: 1976
- Race type: Thoroughbred - Flat racing
- Website: www.arlingtonpark.com

Race information
- Distance: 1 mile (8 furlongs)
- Surface: Polytrack synthetic dirt
- Track: left-handed
- Qualification: Three-year-old fillies
- Weight: Assigned
- Purse: $50,000+

The Purple Violet Stakes is an American Thoroughbred horse race run annually during the first week of September at Arlington Park in Arlington Heights, Illinois, though now it runs in July. Open to three-year-old fillies registered in the State of Illinois, the non-graded stakes is contested at a distance of one mile (8 furlongs) on Polytrack synthetic dirt.

Inaugurated in 1976, it was known as the Colfax Maid Stakes until 1997.

Since inception it has been contested at various distances:

- 6.5 furlongs : 1976-1978
- 7 furlongs : 1979-1987, 1990-1994
- 8 furlongs : 1988-1989, 1995-present

It was run in two divisions in 1984. there was no race run in 1998 and 1999.

== Winners ==
Year	Winner	Jockey	Trainer	Owner	Time
2015	Wildwood Kantharos	Scott Becker	Christopher A. Emigh	William Stiritz	1:39.65
2014	Countess Cashmere	C. H. Marquez Jr.	Tom Swearingen	John Carver	1:37.83
2013	Bold Kitten	Florent Geroux	Wayne Catalano	Ken & Sarah Ramsey	1:37.54
2012	La Tia	Constantino Roman	Brian Williamson	Hernandez Racing Club	1:38.24
2010	Heavenly Lass		Christine Janks	Asiel Stable	1:39.35
