= Paco Gonzalez (horse trainer) =

American horse trainer

Personal information
- Full name: Juan Gonzalez
- Born: March 17, 1945 (age 81) Yahualica, Jalisco, Mexico
- Occupation: Trainer

Horse racing career
- Sport: Horse racing
- Career wins: 399

Major racing wins
- Santa Catalina Stakes (1991); Hollywood Oaks (1992, 2000); Hollywood Turf Cup Stakes (1992, 2000); Swaps Stakes (1992, 1997); Charles Whittingham Memorial Handicap (1993, 2001); El Encino Stakes (1993); Mervyn Leroy Handicap (1994); San Juan Capistrano Handicap (1994, 2001); San Luis Rey Handicap (1994); San Marcos Stakes (1994, 2001); San Bernardino Handicap (1994, 1995, 1996, 2002); San Pasqual Handicap (1995); Norfolk Stakes (1996); San Felipe Stakes (1996, 1997); Santa Anita Derby (1997, 2002); A Gleam Handicap (1998); Pacific Classic Stakes (1998, 2002); Del Mar Mile Handicap (1999); Santa Anita Handicap (1999); San Antonio Handicap (1999); Providencia Stakes (2000); Triple Bend Invitational Handicap (2000); Hopeful Stakes (2001); San Rafael Stakes (2002); San Vicente Stakes (2002)

Significant horses
- Bienamado, Bien Bien, Came Home, Del Mar Dennis, Free House, Mane Minister, Pacific Squall

Juan "Paco" Gonzalez (born March 17, 1945, in Yahualica, Jalisco, Mexico) is an American Thoroughbred horse racing trainer.

== Life ==
The fourth of six children, Gonzalez grew up on a ranch near Guadalajara where his family owned Quarter Horses. As a boy he was inspired to go into the Thoroughbred racing business by two older brothers who were jockeys at Agua Caliente Racetrack in Tijuana. In 1964, Gonzalez followed his brothers north to California where he found work as a stable hand for trainer Joe Manzi under whom he would learn the business for the next twenty-five years.

== Career ==
Manzi died in April 1989, and Gonzalez took over as trainer of the stable. The stable's clients included John Toffan and Trudy McCaffery, Canadian friends who raced as a partnership. Gonzalez, known for his soft spoken and reserves personality. He went on to achieve considerable success as a trainer. Working with Toffan, McCaffrey and other partners, he trained millionaire and multiple Grade I winners Bien Bien, Free House, and Came Home.

- Bien Bien won the 1992 Hollywood Turf Cup Stakes, the 1993 Hollywood Invitational Turf Handicap, and the 1994 San Juan Capistrano Invitational Handicap before retiring with earnings of US$2,498,370. Bien Bien sired millionaire Bienamado whom Gonzalez trained and who in 2000/2001 won the same three major races as his sire had.
- Free House retired with earnings of more than US$3.1 million having won major races such as the 1997 Santa Anita Derby, 1998 Pacific Classic Stakes, and 1999 Santa Anita Handicap. He also ran third in the Kentucky Derby, second by a nose in the Preakness Stakes, and third in the Belmont Stakes.
- Came Home earned US$1,835,940. His wins included the 2001 Hopeful Stakes and the 2002 Santa Anita Derby and Pacific Classic Stakes.

Among other runners conditioned by Gonzalez, Del Mar Dennis won three straight editions of the San Bernardino Handicap between 1994 and 1996. As well, the Gonzalez-trained filly Pacific Squall won the Grade I Hollywood Oaks in 1992.

Trudy McCaffery died in early 2007 and Gonzalez continues to train horses on a smaller scale for John Toffan and wife, Cheryl.
