= Great Communicator =

American Thoroughbred racehorse

- Sire: Key to the Kingdom
- Grandsire: Bold Ruler
- Dam: Blaheen
- Damsire: Beekeeper
- Sex: Stallion
- Foaled: 1983
- Country: United States
- Color: Bay
- Breeder: James B. Watriss
- Owner: Class Act Farm (George Ackel)
- Trainer: Thad Ackel
- Record: 56: 14-10-7
- Earnings: $2,922,615

Major wins
- Hollywood Turf Cup Stakes (1988); San Juan Capistrano Handicap (1988); Golden Gate Handicap (1988); San Luis Obispo Handicap (1988, 1989); San Marcos Handicap (1988); Hollywood Turf Cup (1989); Henry P. Russell Handicap (1990) Breeders' Cup wins: Breeders' Cup Turf (1988)

Great Communicator (1983–1990) was an American Thoroughbred racehorse best known for winning the 1988 Breeders' Cup Turf.

Owned by George Ackel and trained by his son Thad, Great Communicator was a grandson of the Hall of Fame sire Bold Ruler, an eight-time Leading sire in North America whose progeny includes the legendary Secretariat.

Thad Ackel had never started a horse in the Breeders’ Cup before he and jockey Ray Sibille won the Turf with Great Communicator in 1988.

Great Communicator suffered a breakdown in 1990 at the Carleton F. Burke Handicap in Santa Anita Park and was euthanized.

== Pedigree ==
Pedigree of Great Communicator, bay gelding, 1983
Sire Key to the Kingdom	Bold Ruler	Nasrullah	Nearco
Sire Key to the Kingdom	Bold Ruler	Nasrullah	Mumtaz Begum
Sire Key to the Kingdom	Bold Ruler	Miss Disco	Discovery
Sire Key to the Kingdom	Bold Ruler	Miss Disco	Outdone
Sire Key to the Kingdom	Key Bridge	Princequillo	Prince Rose
Sire Key to the Kingdom	Key Bridge	Princequillo	Cosquilla
Sire Key to the Kingdom	Key Bridge	Blue Banner	War Admiral
Sire Key to the Kingdom	Key Bridge	Blue Banner	Risque Blue
Dam Blaheen	Beekeeper	Hillary	Khaled
Dam Blaheen	Beekeeper	Hillary	Snow Bunny
Dam Blaheen	Beekeeper	Saigon	Thumbs Up
Dam Blaheen	Beekeeper	Saigon	Blessed Isle
Dam Blaheen	Irish Rule	Court Splendour	Prince Chevalier
Dam Blaheen	Irish Rule	Court Splendour	Forecourt
Dam Blaheen	Irish Rule	Fern O'Doon	Moonlight Run
Dam Blaheen	Irish Rule	Fern O'Doon	Jessie-o-Doon (family: 1-a)
