= Hollywood Park Racetrack =

Former thoroughbred racetrack in Inglewood, California

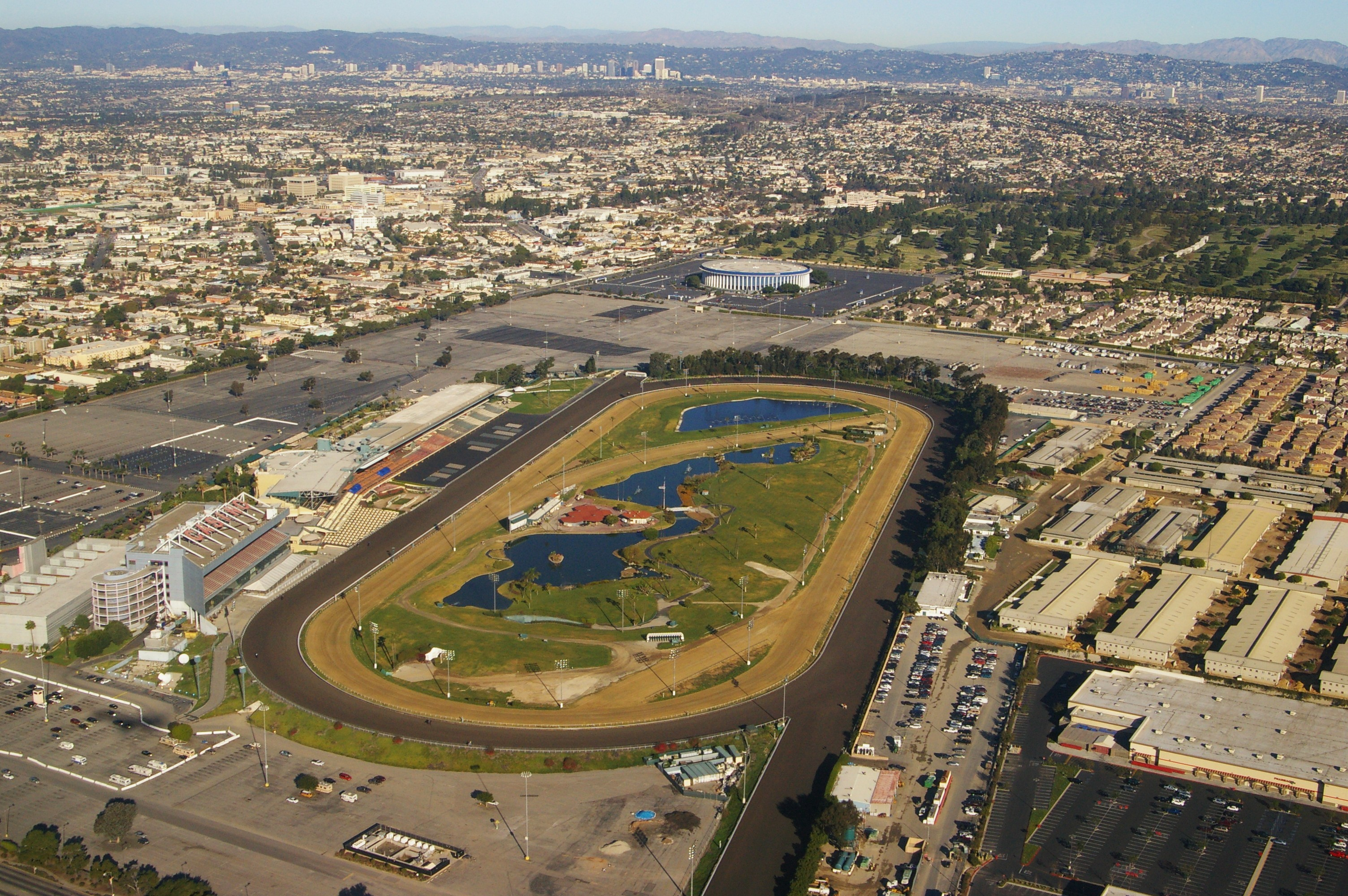
- Hollywood Park Racetrack in January 2009
- Interactive map of Hollywood Park Racetrack
- Location: 1000-1050 South Prairie Avenue Inglewood, California, USA
- Coordinates: 33°57′1.61″N 118°20′16.11″W
- Owned by: Bay Meadows Land Co. (Stockbridge Capital Group)
- Date opened: June 10, 1938
- Date closed: December 22, 2013
- Course type: Thoroughbred. Flat: Synthetic & Turf.
- Notable races: Hollywood Gold Cup (G1); American Oaks Invitational (G1); Hollywood Derby (G1); Matriarch Stakes (G1); Oak Tree Racing Association: Yellow Ribbon Stakes (G1); Hirsch Memorial Turf Championship Stakes (G1); Ancient Title Stakes (G1)

Hollywood Park was a thoroughbred race course located in Inglewood, California, about three miles (5 km) from Los Angeles International Airport and adjacent to the Forum indoor arena. In 1994, the original Hollywood Park Casino was added to the racetrack complex. Horse racing and training were shut down in December 2013 though the casino operations continued until the Hollywood Park Casino opened in October 2016.

The track was demolished in stages from 2014 until 2016 and the area is now the site of a master-planned neighborhood in development named Hollywood Park after the former track. The most prominent parts of the development are SoFi Stadium, home of the Los Angeles Rams and Los Angeles Chargers of the National Football League (NFL), YouTube Theater, a 6,000-seat performance arts venue, Hollywood Park Casino, and the NFL Los Angeles building, which is home to the NFL Network, NFL RedZone, NFL.com, the NFL app, and ESPN's Los Angeles studio production operations.

== History ==
=== Founding and early years ===
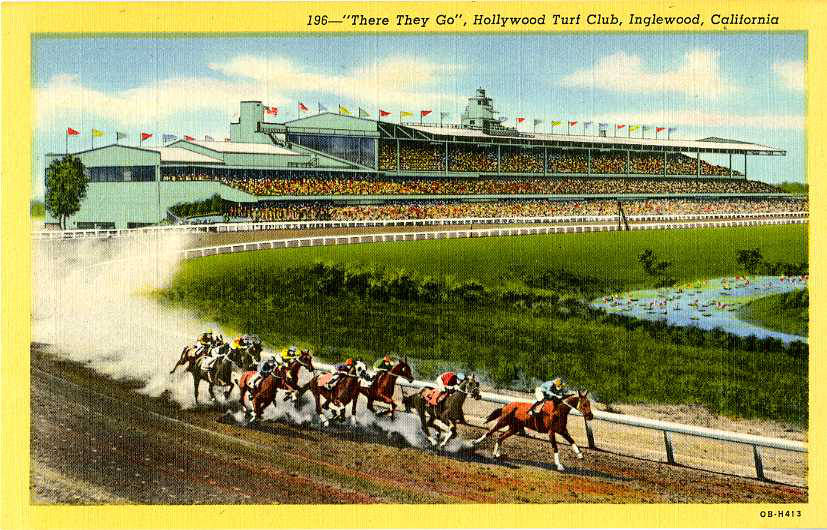
Hollywood Turf Club, circa 1940s

The track was opened on June 10, 1938, by the Hollywood Turf Club the racetrack was designed by noted racetrack architect Arthur Froehlich. Its chairman was Jack L. Warner of the Warner Bros. film studio. Prominent shareholders included Jack Warner's brother and fellow Warner Bros. executive Harry, Hollywood studio executives Walt Disney, Samuel Goldwyn, Darryl Zanuck, actors Al Jolson, Bing Crosby, Joan Blondell, George Jessel, Ronald Colman and Ralph Bellamy. In addition to being shareholders film directors Raoul Walsh and Mervyn LeRoy were also founding members of the track's Board of Directors with Jack and Harry Warner and Al Jolson.

=== War closure and rebuilding ===
Hollywood Park closed from 1942 to 1944 due to World War II, where it was used as a storage facility for North American Aviation. In 1944, the California Horse Racing Board permitted Hollywood Park to hold a new charitable season. The board approved an “extensive war relief program” for both 1944 and 1945 and Hollywood Park raised more than $1 million for charities and schools. In 1949, shortly after $1 million in upgrades were made, the grandstand and clubhouse were destroyed by fire. The rebuilt facility reopened in 1950. Both Thoroughbred racing and harness racing took place at the venue.

Marje Everett, who sold Arlington Park to Gulf & Western in 1968, became part-owner of Hollywood Park.

Everett became director in 1972 and CEO in 1985. Circa 1979, the Los Angeles Times said Hollywood Park was "one of the West Coast’s largest and most popular racetracks." Thoroughbred racing took place until July (post time 2 p.m, Wednesday through Sunday), harness racing began in late August.

In 1984, the racetrack was extended from one mile (1.6 km) around to 1 1/8 miles (1.8 km) around prior to the first Breeders’ Cup race.

By the late 1980s the racetrack Hollywood Park, though frequented by celebrities, was near the point of bankruptcy. In 1989, a group of investors was working to buy Los Alamitos Racetrack in California for $68 million. Los Alamitos, owned by Hollywood Park, was still under its original ownership as of 1991, though a significant portion of the stock had been bought by external investors. RD Hubbard became CEO of Hollywood Park in April 1991, after having purchased a portion of the company's stock in late 1990. He was assisted in the ouster of Marje Everett by company shareholder Tom Gamel and sports businessman Harry Ornest. In 1991, $20 million was spent improving the racetrack. That year the park earned its first profit in five years, and despite rioting in nearby Los Angeles in 1992, annual profits that year increased to $5.4 million. By 1993, the Los Angeles Times wrote that "shareholders at Hollywood Park... are enjoying substantial investment gains." A card club casino was added to the complex in 1994, as Hollywood Park underwent a $100 million expansion into Hollywood Park Casino, which opened in the summer of 1994. Also in 1994, Hollywood Park Inc. purchased the Arizona-based Turf Paradise Race Track for $34 million in stock.

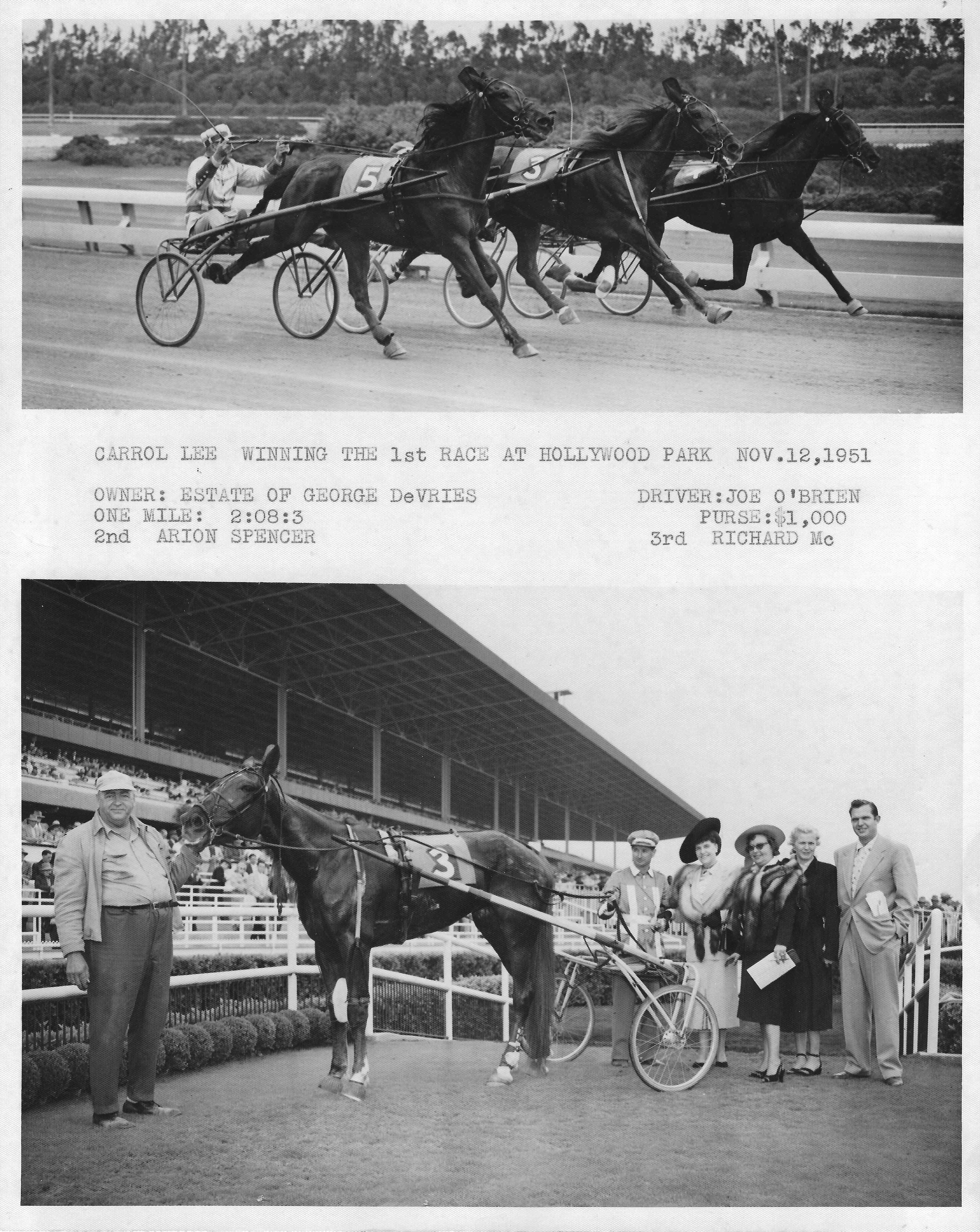
Harness Racing at Hollywood Park, November 1951 (Harry Birdsey, Trainer)

In May 1995 after the departure of the Rams for St. Louis, the owners of the National Football League teams approved with a 27–1 vote with two abstentions, a resolution supporting a plan to build a $200 million, 65,000-seat, privately financed stadium on property owned by Hollywood Park for the Los Angeles Raiders. The deal was put together by Hubbard who envisioned a sports complex with the new stadium and the racetrack together. Raiders owner Al Davis later balked and refused the deal over a stipulation that he would have to accept a second team at the stadium. After the deal fell through the Raiders returned to Oakland, California. While the stadium plan was never realized, the site became a focus of plans by the National Football League to bring the league back to the Los Angeles Area.

Hollywood Park Inc. suffered losses in 1995, though at the end of 1996, Hollywood Park bought Boomtown, Inc. for $188 million. Boomtown was headquartered in Reno, Nevada, and operated and owned casinos in several other cities such as Las Vegas and New Orleans. Boomtown merged with the casino operator Pinnacle Entertainment in 1998. Hollywood Park was purchased by Churchill Downs Incorporated on September 10, 1999 for $140 million. Churchill Downs acquired Hollywood Park-Casino in the process, which was in turn leased by Hollywood Park Inc. (later named Pinnacle Entertainment). The previous owners of the track renamed their company Pinnacle Entertainment to concentrate on its gambling interests.

=== Sale and later developments ===
In July 2005, Churchill Downs Incorporated sold the track to the Bay Meadows Land Company which was owned by Stockbridge Capital Group for $260 million in cash. Under the terms of the deal, the company, which at the time also operated Bay Meadows in San Mateo, was to continue thoroughbred racing at Hollywood Park for at least three years. According to Bay Meadows officials, the continuation of Hollywood Park as a racing venue after that depended on California allowing more gambling, like slot machines, to the track.

Some of the Hollywood Park land was sold to real estate developers to build a new housing community called the Inglewood Renaissance. Development began in 2005.

New grass was planted on the turf course after Hollywood Park's spring-summer meet in 2005. Due to safety concerns, however, turf racing was not conducted for that year's autumn meet. As a result, several major stakes races that comprised Hollywood's Autumn Turf Festival were cancelled that year.

After the conclusion of Hollywood's spring-summer meet in 2006, it was announced that a second chute would be built inside the turf course to accommodate sprint races at six furlongs. This followed a similar move by Monmouth Park to build a turf chute for sprint races.

In 2010, Hollywood Park played host for the first time to Oak Tree.

==== Betfair/Hollywood Park Agreement ====
The Hollywood Park Racing Association and Betfair US, the Los Angeles-based subsidiary of Betfair that also owns TVG Network, completed a historic agreement March 13, 2012 intended to transform the customer experience for fans at the venue as well as online and on television. Under terms of the five-year deal, Hollywood Park was renamed "Betfair Hollywood Park" in what was the first naming rights agreement for a horse racing venue in the United States.

=== Closure and redevelopment ===
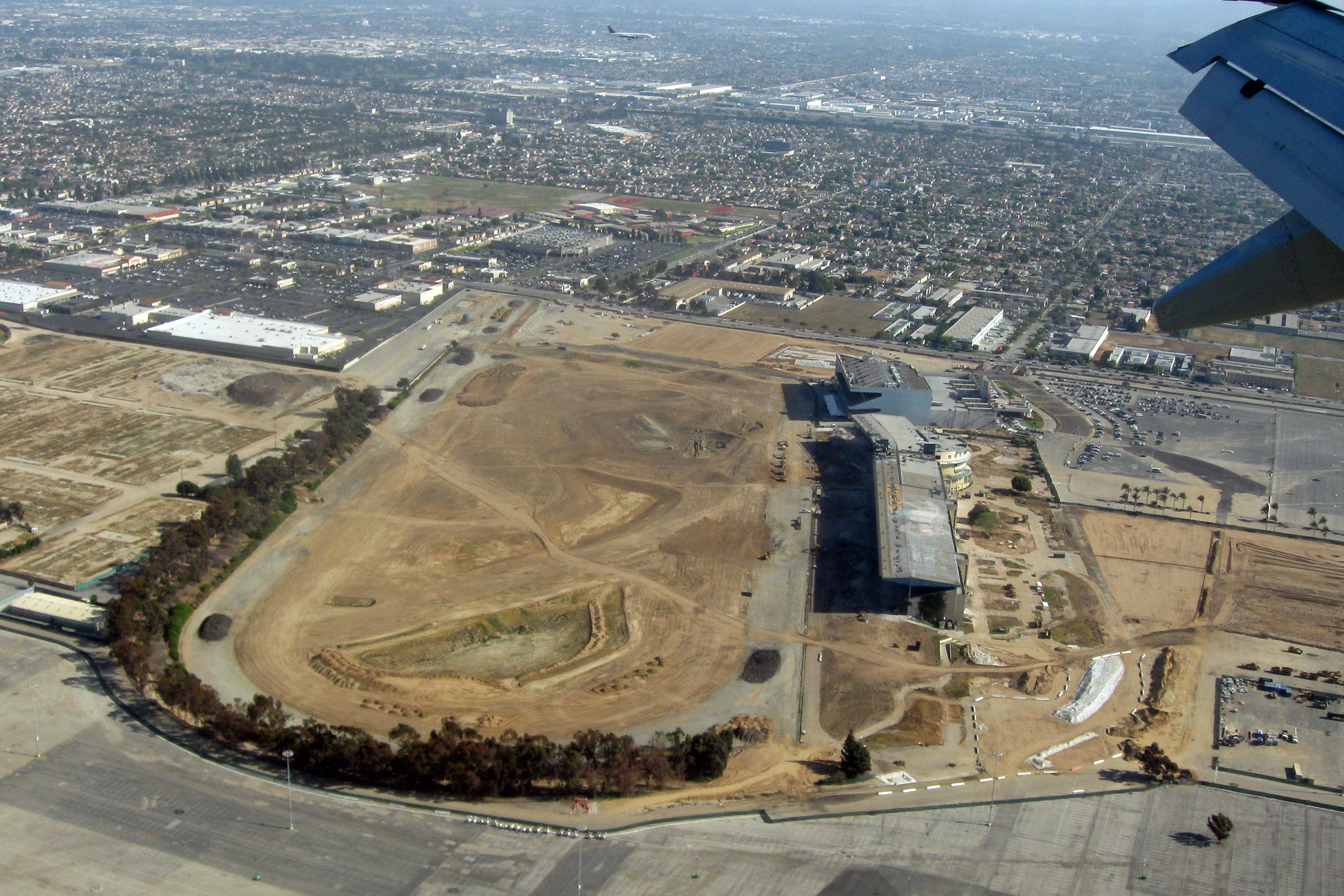
Former racetrack site, in 2015

On May 9, 2013, in a letter to employees, Hollywood Park president F. Jack Liebau announced that the track would be closing at the end of their fall racing season in 2013. In the letter, Liebau stated that the 260 acres (110 ha) on which the track sits "now simply has a higher and better use", and that "in the absence of a favorable change in racing's business model, the ultimate development of the Hollywood property was inevitable". It was expected that the track would be demolished and replaced by housing units, park land and an entertainment complex, while the casino would be renovated.

On December 22, 2013, at 6:11pm the final race was run with Woodmans Luck taking first place, Depreciable in second place and Danderek in third place, concluding 75 years of near-continuous racing in Southern California. The complex was demolished in 2014 to make way for a new residential complex.

In 2014, Stan Kroenke, owner of the NFL's St. Louis Rams, purchased a 60-acre (24 ha) parcel of land adjacent to the track property and The Forum with the intentions of building a National Football League stadium on the land. Kroenke's 60 acres (24 ha) was not big enough for an NFL stadium and parking, but his announced partnership for the neighboring track land with Stockbridge Capital Group, would fold the stadium into the larger office/retail/residential project planned for the track site by master planner Hart Howerton.

On February 24, 2015, the Inglewood City Council approved a plan to build a 70,000-seat football stadium on the site in anticipation of the St. Louis Rams moving back to Los Angeles (which was the team's previous home from 1946 until 1994). On May 31, 2015, with Inglewood mayor James T. Butts Jr. on hand sporting a Rams cap, the grandstand was reduced to rubble in a flurry of timed explosions.

On January 12, 2016, the NFL voted to move the Rams back to Los Angeles by a vote of 30–2, a move of the Chargers would soon follow next year after a failed attempt at getting a new stadium built in downtown San Diego. In October 2016, the last part of the former track, the Casino, was demolished and a new Hollywood Park Casino was opened next door. Construction of the new stadium and redevelopment of the former track site began in earnest.

The graves of horses buried at the track such as Native Diver, Landaluce, and Great Communicator and their monuments were moved to other tracks in the area or to the horses' breeding grounds. The statue of Swaps and Bill Shoemaker that stood at the clubhouse entrance gardens was placed into storage and will be placed either at the new development or in a new location.

Several 13-foot (4.0 m) ficus trees were saved from the former track property and re-planted within the new development around SoFi Stadium.

=== Notable events at the track ===
- In 1951, Citation became the first million-dollar-winning horse by winning the Hollywood Gold Cup in his final start.
- On July 3, 1977, recent Triple Crown winner, Seattle Slew, finished fourth in the Swaps Stakes, a major upset.
- Niatross wins the American Pacing Classic in a world record 1.52 1/5.
- The track hosted the inaugural Breeders' Cup in 1984 and also hosted the event in 1987 and 1997.
- 1991 introduced Friday night racing on 12 Fridays during the summer meet.
- The Quarantine Barn, with four six-stall sections, was constructed adjacent to the main stable gate for the 1992 Autumn Meet.This facility permitted international shippers to come directly to Hollywood Park upon arrival at Los Angeles International Airport.
- The 3,000-square-foot (280 m^{2}) Noble Threewitt/Charlie Whittingham Horsemen's Lounge opened in December, 1993.
- On December 10, 1999, Laffit Pincay, Jr. surpassed Bill Shoemaker's all-time record for race wins by a jockey.
- Cesario (JPN) becomes the first Japanese-bred, Japan-based racehorse to win an American stakes race in nearly 50 years, winning the July 2005 American Oaks.
- Stafford Repp, who played Chief O'Hara on the 1960s Batman TV series, suffered a fatal heart attack at the age of 56 on November 5, 1974.

== Physical attributes ==
The track had a 1 1/8-mile (1.8 km) dirt oval, plus a 1-mile 145 foot (1.654 km) turf oval. The track regularly seated 10,000 people. A new Cushion Track racing surface was installed in September, 2006 to replace the existing dirt, making Hollywood Park the first track in California to meet the California Horse Racing Board's guideline that all tracks in the state replace dirt surfaces with a safer artificial surface by the end of 2007.

== Racing ==
These races were the graded stakes races run at Hollywood Park. Most of the races were moved to Santa Anita Park, Los Alamitos Race Course, and Del Mar Racetrack after Hollywood Park closed. (All turf stakes listed below were put on hiatus during the 2005 Autumn Meet.)

Grade 1 :

- American Oaks
- CashCall Futurity
- Citation Handicap
- Gamely Stakes
- Hollywood Derby
- Hollywood Gold Cup
- Hollywood Starlet Stakes
- Matriarch Stakes
- Shoemaker Mile Stakes
- Triple Bend Invitational Handicap
- Vanity Handicap

Grade 2 :

- A Gleam Invitational Handicap
- American Handicap
- Bayakoa Handicap
- Beverly Hills Handicap
- Californian Stakes
- CashCall Mile Invitational Stakes
- Charles Whittingham Memorial Handicap
- Dahlia Handicap
- Hollywood Breeders' Cup Oaks
- Hollywood Turf Cup Stakes
- Honeymoon Breeders' Cup Handicap
- Lazaro Barrera Memorial Stakes
- Marjorie L. Everett Handicap
- Mervyn Leroy Handicap
- Milady Breeders' Cup Handicap
- Winter Stakes (Hollywood Park)
- Sunset Handicap
- Swaps Stakes

Grade 3 :

- Affirmed Handicap
- Ack Ack Handicap
- Cinema Handicap
- Generous Stakes
- Hawthorne Handicap
- Hollywood Juvenile Championship Stakes
- Hollywood Prevue Stakes
- Hollywood Turf Express Handicap
- Inglewood Handicap
- Jim Murray Memorial Handicap
- Los Angeles Handicap
- Miesque Stakes
- Native Diver Handicap
- Railbird Stakes
- Senorita Stakes
- Vernon O. Underwood Stakes
- Will Rogers Stakes
- Wilshire Handicap

Ungraded stakes :

- Alydar Stakes
- Cinderella Stakes
- Desert Stormer Handicap
- Fran's Valentine Stakes
- Gallant Man Handicap
- Khaled Stakes
- Moccasin Stakes
- Real Quiet Stakes
- Tiznow Stakes
- Willard L. Proctor Memorial Stakes

== See also ==
- Hollywood Park Casino, casino formerly part of the racetrack, still in operation in new facilities
- Bob Benoit, general manager beginning in 1977
