= John Toffan =

Canadian-born US thoroughbred horse owner-breeder (died 2019)

- Died: June 18, 2019; Hidden Hills, California
- Occupation: Thoroughbred racehorse owner-breeder
- Years active: 1989 - 2012
- Spouse: Cheryl Toffan

John Toffan was a Canadian-born American Thoroughbred racehorse owner-breeder in California. He came to fame with his partnership with Trudy McCaffery. He had a long career racing purebreds ranging from 1989 to 2012.

Toffan began his career in 1989 with his partnership with Trudy McCaffery, which went on to become one of California's top racing-breeding operations. In 1997 McCaffery and Tofan were named as "Owners of the Year" by the Thoroughbred Owners and Breeders Association. Their most renowned purebred was 'Free House'. After McCaffery's death in 2007, he continued his career with purebreds partnered by his spouse Cheryl Toffan.

Toffan died on June 18, 2019 at the age of 83 after suffering from a lengthy illness.

== Top runners ==
- Mane Minister (b. 1988) - Finished third in the 1991 Belmont Stakes
- Bien Bien (b. 1989)
- Free House (b. 1994) – A homebred who was a two-time California Horse of the Year and whose eight stakes race wins included California's three most important dirt races: the Santa Anita Derby (1997), the Pacific Classic Stakes (1998), and the Santa Anita Handicap (1999);
- Came Home (b. 1999)
