= Trudy McCaffery =

- Born: April 10, 1944; Winnipeg, Manitoba, Canada
- Died: February 12, 2007 (aged 62); Rancho Santa Fe, California, U.S.
- Occupations: Thoroughbred Racing executive Racehorse owner/breeder
- Board member of: Edwin J. Gregson Foundation; National Thoroughbred Racing Association Charities; California Thoroughbred Breeders Association; Oak Tree Racing Association; Thoroughbred Owners of California; Thoroughbred Owners and Breeders Association
- Parent(s): Maxine & Melvin Hanson
- Honors: Thoroughbred Owners and Breeders Association Owners of the Year (1997); National Thoroughbred Racing Association Commissioners Cup (2002); Clay Puett Award (2004)

Trudy V. McCaffery (April 10, 1944 – February 12, 2007) was a Thoroughbred racehorse owner-breeder in California who served on the board of directors of the Edwin J. Gregson Foundation, the NTRA Charities, the California Thoroughbred Breeders Association, the Oak Tree Racing Association, and the Thoroughbred Owners of California. She was also a trustee with the Thoroughbred Owners and Breeders Association.

== Early life ==
Born Trudy Hanson in Winnipeg, Manitoba, Canada, she was the daughter of Minnesota-born Canadian Football Hall of Fame inductee Melvin "Fritz" Hanson and his wife, Maxine. As a young girl growing up in Calgary, Alberta, she became an accomplished equestrian. As an adult, in addition to participating in the sport of horse racing, she was an avid golfer.

== Thoroughbred racing ==
While living in Rancho Santa Fe, California, in 1989 she began a racing partnership with Canadian-born John Toffan. It became one of California's top racing and breeding operations, and in 1997 the Thoroughbred Owners and Breeders Association named them "Owners of the Year". They bred Round Pond, who won the 2006 Breeders' Cup Distaff. Their top runners included:

- Mane Minister (b. 1988) – Won Santa Catalina Stakes and finished third in all three of the U.S. Triple Crown races;
- Pacific Squall (b. 1989) – won Grade I Hollywood Oaks (1992);
- Bien Bien (b. 1989) – a homebred who won four Grade I races including the San Juan Capistrano Invitational Handicap and set a course record for 1¼ miles while winning the Hollywood Invitational Turf Handicap. Retired with earnings of $2,498,370;
- Free House (b. 1994) – a homebred who was a two-time California Horse of the Year and whose eight stakes race wins included California's three most important dirt races: the Santa Anita Derby (1997), the Pacific Classic Stakes (1998), and the Santa Anita Handicap (1999);
- A. P. Assay (b. 1994) – won the 1998 A Gleam Invitational Handicap and Desert Stormer Handicap;
- Bienamado (b. 1996) – a homebred son of Bien Bien, raced in Europe and the United States in partnership with Robert Sangster. Won Prix de Condé in France and three Grade I races in California. Career earnings of $1,261,009;
- Bosque Redondo (b. 1997) – a homebred son of Mane Minister. In 2002 won the San Bernardino Handicap;
- Came Home (b. 1999) – a homebred raced in partnership with John Goodman and William Farish III whose wins included the Grade I Hopeful Stakes at Saratoga Race Course and Santa Anita Park's Pacific Classic Stakes and Santa Anita Derby. Career earnings of $1,835,940.

In addition to her involvement with various California horse racing associations, in 1999 McCaffery founded "Kids to the Cup", a non-profit organization dedicated to developing young racing fans. She was also a member of the board of directors of the Edwin J. Gregson Foundation, which raises money to help racetrack backstretch employees, and the board of the National Thoroughbred Racing Association Charities. For her contributions to the Thoroughbred racing industry, she was awarded the 2002 National Thoroughbred Racing Association Commissioners Cup and the 2004 Clay Puett Award by the Racetrack Industry Program.

== Death ==
Sixty-two-year-old McCaffery died of lung cancer at her home on February 12, 2007, after a lengthy illness.
