= Breeders' Cup Juvenile Fillies top three finishers =

This is a listing of the horses that finished in either first, second, or third place and the number of starters in the Breeders' Cup Juvenile Fillies, a grade one race run on dirt held on Friday of the Breeders' Cup World Thoroughbred Championships.

Year	Winner	Second	Third	Starters
2026	Emphatic	Miss Monica	Manuka Money	12
2025	Super Corredora	Explora	Percy’s Bar	9
2024	Immersive	Vodka With a Twist	Quickick	9
2023	Just F Y I	Jody’s Pride	Candied	12
2022	Wonder Wheel	Leave No Trace	Raging Sea	13
2021	Echo Zulu	Juju's Map	Tarabi	6
2020	Vequist	Dayoutoftheoffice	Girl Daddy	7
2019	British Idiom	Donna Veloce	Bast	9
2018	Jaywalk	Restless Rider	Vibrance	10
2017	Caledonia Road	Allluring Star	Blonde Bomber	13
2016	Champagne Room	Valadorna	American Gal	12
2015	Songbird	Rachel's Valentina	Dothraki Queen	10
2014	Take Charge Brandi	Top Decile	Wonder Girl	12
2013	Ria Antonia	She's a Tiger	Rosalind	10
2012	Beholder	Executiveprivilege	Dreaming of Julia	8
2011	My Miss Aurelia	Grace Hall	Weemissfrankie	14
2010	Awesome Feather	R Heat Lightning	Delightful Mary	12
2009	She Be Wild	Beautician	Blind Luck	12
2008	Stardom Bound	Dream Empress	Sky Diva	13
2007	Indian Blessing	Proud Spell	Backseat Rhythm	12
2006	Dreaming of Anna	Octave	Cotton Blossom	14
2005	Folklore	Wild Fit	Original Spin	10
2004	Sweet Catomine	Balletto	Runway Model	12
2003	Halfbridled	Ashado	Victory U.S.A.	14
2002	Storm Flag Flying	Composure	Santa Catarina	10
2001	Tempera	Imperial Gesture	Bella Bellucci	9
2000	Caressing	Platinum Tiara	She's A Devil Due	12
1999	Cash Run	Chilukki	Surfside	9
1998	Silverbulletday	Excellent Meeting	Three Ring	10
1997	Countess Diana	Career Collection	Primaly	14
1996	Storm Song	Love That Jazz	Critical Factor	12
1995	My Flag	Cara Rafaela	Golden Attraction	8
1994	Flanders	Serena's Song	Stormy Blues	13
1993	Phone Chatter	Sardula	Heavenly Prize	8
1992	Eliza	Educated Risk	Boots 'N Jackie	12
1991	Pleasant Stage	La Spia	Cadillac Women	14
1990	Meadow Star	Private Treasure	Dance Smartly	13
1989	Go For Wand	Sweet Roberta	Stella Madrid	12
1988	Open Mind	Darby Shuffle	Lea Lucinda	12
1987	Epitome	Jeanne Jones	Dream Team	12
1986	Brave Raj	Tappiano	Saros Brig	12
1985	Twilight Ridge	Family Style	Steal A Kiss	12
1984 †	Outstandingly	Dusty Heart	Fine Spirit	11

- † In 1984, Fran's Valentine won but was disqualified for interference in the stretch and set back to tenth.

== See also ==
- Breeders' Cup Juvenile Fillies
- Breeders' Cup World Thoroughbred Championships
