= Sorrento Stakes =

- Class: Grade III
- Location: Del Mar Racetrack; Del Mar, California
- Inaugurated: 1967
- Race type: Thoroughbred – Flat racing
- Website: Del Mar

Race information
- Distance: 6 furlongs
- Surface: Dirt
- Track: Left-handed
- Qualification: Two-year-old Fillies
- Weight: 123 lbs with allowances
- Purse: $150,000 (since 2024)

The Sorrento Stakes is a Grade III American Thoroughbred horse race for two-year-old fillies over a distance of six furlongs on the dirt track scheduled annually in August at Del Mar Racetrack in Del Mar, California. The event currently carries a purse of $150,000.

== History ==
The event was inaugurated on 7 October 1967 during the then Del Mar Fall meeting and was run over a distance of 7 1/2 furlongs on the turf course. It was won by Windsor Honey who was ridden by US Hall of Fame jockey Johnny Sellers with a time of 1:30 3/5. The event was idle for two years, and when it resumed the event was scheduled early in the summer meeting in 1970 and needed to be split into two divisions at a distance of six furlongs.

The event has had several changes in distance but returned to the six furlong sprint in 2018.

In 1986 the event was classified as Grade III and was upgraded to Grade II in 1994. However, the event was downgraded back to Grade III in 2004 before being upgraded once more in 2015.

The event's position in the racing calendar at Del Mar has led to the race being a preparatory race for the Del Mar Debutante Stakes which is usually scheduled for several weeks later.

Notable winners of this event include the 1972 winner, Windy's Daughter, whose win in the race was part of an undefeated seven-race season. The following year the filly was crowned the first California-bred Horse of the Year. The 1986 winner Brave Raj not only captured the Sorrento Stakes–Del Mar Debutante Stakes double, but also went on to win the Breeders' Cup Juvenile Fillies becoming the richest two-year-old filly in history winning $911,150 during the season. The filly Silverbulletday won this event in 1998. Later that year she would also win the Breeders' Cup Juvenile Fillies and be crowned the US Champion Two-Year-Old Filly. The 2001 winner Tempera won as the odds-on favorite by nine lengths, the largest victory length in the event and also went on to win the Breeders' Cup Juvenile Fillies and be crowned the US Champion Two-Year-Old Filly. The last filly to win the Sorrento Stakes and also the Breeders' Cup Juvenile Fillies was Champagne Room in 2016.

== Records ==
Speed records:

- 6 furlongs – 1:09.00 Windy's Daughter (1972)
- 6 1/2 furlongs: 1:15.60 – Batroyale (1995)
- 7 furlongs: 1:22.00 – Lite Light (1990)
- 1 mile: 1:35.80 – Hazel R. (1979)

Margins:

- 9 lengths – Tempera (2001)

Most wins by a jockey:

- 6 – Laffit Pincay Jr. (1976, 1980, 1987, 1989, 1993, 2000)
- 5 – Bill Shoemaker (1972, 1977, 1981, 1982, 1984)
- 5 – David Flores (1999, 2001, 2003, 2004, 2007)

Most wins by a trainer:

- 10 – Bob Baffert (1991, 1995, 1998, 1999, 2004, 2012, 2015, 2024, 2025, 2026)

Most wins by an owner:

- 3 – Elmendorf (1974, 1975, 1978)

Sorrento Stakes – Del Mar Debutante Stakes double

- Windy's Daughter (1972), Fleet Peach (1973), Queen to Be (1975), Telferner (1976), Arewehavingfunyet (1985), Brave Raj (1986), Batroyale (1995), Chilukki (1999), Mi Sueno (2009), Executiveprivilege (2012), Bellafina (2018)

== Winners ==
Year	Winner	Jockey	Trainer	Owner	Distance	Time	Purse	Grade	Ref
2026	Holmby	Juan J. Hernandez	Bob Baffert	By Talla Racing	6 furlongs	1:10.73	$150,500	III	
2025	Himika	Juan J. Hernandez	Bob Baffert	Baoma Corp	6 furlongs	1:10.61	$150,500	III	
2024	Nooni	Juan J. Hernandez	Bob Baffert	Zedan Racing Stables	6 furlongs	1:10.41	$147,000	III	
2023	Dreamfyre	Hector Berrios	O. J. Jauregui	Danny A. Eplin	6 furlongs	1:10.52	$201,000	II	
2022	Vegas Magic	Abel Cedillo	Doug F. O'Neill	Omar Aldabbagh, Todd Cady & Ty Leatherman	6 furlongs	1:11.46	$200,500	II	
2021	Elm Drive	Juan Hernandez	Phillip D'Amato	Little Red Feather Racing	6 furlongs	1:10.64	$201,500	II	
2020	My Girl Red	Flavien Prat	J. Keith Desormeaux	Erich G. Brehm	6 furlongs	1:12.12	$150,500	II	
2019	Amalfi Sunrise	Norberto Arroyo Jr.	Simon Callaghan	Doug Branham & Marsha Naify	6 furlongs	1:10.96	$200,351	II	
2018	Bellafina	Flavien Prat	Simon Callaghan	Kaleem Shah	6 furlongs	1:10.61	$201,725	II	
2017	Spectator	Jamie Theriot	Philip D'Amato	Rick & Sharon Waller	6 1/2 furlongs	1:17.66	$200,690	II	
2016	Champagne Room	Mario Gutierrez	Peter Eurton	Ciaglia, Exline-Border, Gulliver Racing, R. Christensen, D. Legan & S. Alesia	6 1/2 furlongs	1:16.35	$200,000	II	
2015	Pretty N Cool	Martin Garcia	Bob Baffert	Karl Watson, Michael E. Pegram & Paul Weitman	6 1/2 furlongs	1:16.94	$200,250	II	
2014	Sunset Glow	Victor Espinoza	Wesley A. Ward	Ten Broeck Farm	6 1/2 furlongs	1:16.61	$200,000	II	
2013	Concav	Mario Gutierrez	Doug F. O'Neill	Reddam Racing	6 1/2 furlongs	1:17.45	$150,500	II	
2012	Executiveprivilege	Rafael Bejarano	Bob Baffert	Karl Watson, Michael E. Pegram & Paul Weitman	6 1/2 furlongs	1:16.98	$150,000	III	
2011	Mighty Caroline	Joel Rosario	Melody Conlon	John M. Liviakis	6 1/2 furlongs	1:16.75	$150,000	III	
2010	Wickedly Perfect	Rafael Bejarano	Doug F. O'Neill	STD Racing Stable, Peter Moehrke & Rafter JR Ranch	6 1/2 furlongs	1:17.18	$150,000	III	
2009	Mi Sueno	Michael C. Baze	Eric J. Guillot	Southern Equine Stable	6 1/2 furlongs	1:14.40	$150,000	III	
2008	Evita Argentina	Tyler Baze	John W. Sadler	Halo Farms & Three Sisters Thoroughbreds	6 1/2 furlongs	1:17.51	$150,000	III	
2007	Tasha's Miracle	David R. Flores	John W. Sadler	Budget Stable & Team Valor	6 1/2 furlongs	1:19.59	$150,000	III	
2006	Untouched Talent	Victor Espinoza	Jeffrey L. Bonde	Sikura, Tommy Town Thoroughbreds, Vreeland, et al.	6 1/2 furlongs	1:18.20	$150,000	III	
2005	Bully Bones	René R. Douglas	David La Croix	Gene & Lolli Anderson, Meadowbrook Farms, et al.	6 1/2 furlongs	1:17.36	$150,000	III	
2004	Inspiring	David R. Flores	Bob Baffert	Robert B. and Beverly J. Lewis	6 1/2 furlongs	1:18.29	$150,000	III	
2003	Tizdubai	David R. Flores	Eoin G. Harty	Darley Stable	6 1/2 furlongs	1:17.15	$150,000	II	
2002	Buffythecenterfold	Matt S. Garcia	Melvin F. Stute	Allen A. Brian & Stronach Stables	6 1/2 furlongs	1:17.39	$150,000	II	
2001	Tempera	David R. Flores	Eoin G. Harty	Godolphin Racing	6 1/2 furlongs	1:16.13	$150,000	II	
2000	Give Praise	Laffit Pincay Jr.	James K. Chapman	James K. Chapman, Ron Parker & Stuart Tsujimoto	6 1/2 furlongs	1:17.88	$150,000	II	
1999	Chilukki	David R. Flores	Bob Baffert	Stonerside Stable	6 1/2 furlongs	1:16.40	$150,000	II	
1998	Silverbulletday	Gary L. Stevens	Bob Baffert	Michael E. Pegram	6 1/2 furlongs	1:17.56	$108,300	II	
1997	Career Collection	Corey Nakatani	Wallace Dollase	Golden Eagle Farm	6 1/2 furlongs	1:17.83	$107,825	II	
1996	Desert Digger	Eddie Delahoussaye	Marcelo Polanco	6 C Stable	6 1/2 furlongs	1:16.03	$105,950	II	
1995	Batroyale	Gary L. Stevens	Bob Baffert	Mr & Mrs Robert H. Walter	6 1/2 furlongs	1:15.26	$104,200	II	
1994	How So Oiseau	Pat Valenzuela	Brian A. Mayberry	Jan, Mace & Samantha Siegel	6 1/2 furlongs	1:15.89	$80,850	II	
1993	Phone Chatter	Laffit Pincay Jr.	Richard E. Mandella	Herman Sarkowsky	6 1/2 furlongs	1:16.23	$79,650	III	
1992	Zoonaqua	Eddie Delahoussaye	Brian A. Mayberry	Jerry & Ann Moss	7 furlongs	1:22.67	$82,875	III	
1991	Soviet Sojourn	Corey Nakatani	Bob Baffert	Hal Earnhardt	7 furlongs	1:22.38	$76,350	III	
1990	Lite Light	Russell Baze	Henry M. Moreno	Jack L. Finley	7 furlongs	1:22.00	$81,450	III	
1989	Cheval Volant	Laffit Pincay Jr.	Kenneth J. Jumps	Steve Shapiro, Dave Stark & Kenneth J. Jumps	7 furlongs	1:23.80	$80,325	III	
1988	Stocks Up	Gary L. Stevens	Ted West	Coelho, Merrill & Valenti	7 furlongs	1:23.40	$82,100	III	
1987	Hasty Pasty	Laffit Pincay Jr.	John Gosden	Aaron & Candy Spelling	7 furlongs	1:23.00	$64,200	III	
1986	Brave Raj	Pat Valenzuela	Melvin F. Stute	Dolly Green	7 furlongs	1:22.60	$55,750	III	
1985	Arewehavingfunyet	Pat Valenzuela	D. Wayne Lukas	Spendthrift Farm	1 mile	1:37.00	$56,750	Listed	
1984	Wayward Pirate	Bill Shoemaker	V. James Mayer	Albert Yank	1 mile	1:37.20	$53,580	Listed	
1983	Leading Ladybug	Pat Valenzuela	Melvin F. Stute	William R. Hawn	1 mile	1:40.20	$53,650	Listed	
1982	Time of Sale	Bill Shoemaker	Chay R. Knight	Northwest Farms	1 mile	1:38.40	$54,800	Listed	
1981	First Advance	Bill Shoemaker	Valadez B. Joshua Jr.	Margaret & Frank Rappa	1 mile	1:38.60	$44,100	Listed	
1980	Native Fancy	Laffit Pincay Jr.	Louis R. Carno	Mr. & Mrs. T. M. Cavanagh	1 mile	1:38.80	$38,700	Listed	
1979	Hazel R.	Chris McCarron	Barney Willis	Royce Roberts & Samuel Roffe	1 mile	1:35.80	$32,600	Listed	
1978	§ Beauty Hour	Marco Castaneda	Ron McAnally	Elmendorf Farm	1 mile	1:37.00	$32,650	Listed	
1977	§ My Little Maggie	Bill Shoemaker	Jay M. Robbins	Jay M. Robbins & Jack D. Rogers	1 mile	1:36.40	$27,400	Listed	
1976	Telferner	Laffit Pincay Jr.	A. Thomas Doyle	J. C. Pollard	1 mile	1:36.60	$27,400	Listed	
1975	Queen to Be	Darrel G. McHargue	Ron McAnally	Elmendorf Farm	1 mile	1:36.80	$22,350	Listed	
1974	Spout	Álvaro Pineda	Vincent Clyne	Elmendorf Farm	1 mile	1:36.80	$23,000	Listed	
1973	Fleet Peach	Donald Pierce	A. Thomas Doyle	Canadiana Farms	6 furlongs	1:09.20	$21,600	Listed	
1972	Windy's Daughter	Bill Shoemaker	A. Thomas Doyle	Bernice Blackman	6 furlongs	1:09.00	$15,875		
1971	Chargerette	Frank Olivares	Harold C. McBride	Sam Crivello & Santina Webber	6 furlongs	1:09.20	$16,500		
1970	June Darling	William Mahorney	Warren Stute	Clement L. Hirsch	6 furlongs	1:10.80	$13,437		Division 1
1970	Countess Market	Álvaro Pineda	Linwood J. Brooks	Paul Bouffier	6 furlongs	1:10.40	$13,537		Division 2
1968–1969		Race not held							
1967	Windsor Honey	Johnny Sellers	Jerry M. Fanning	Hemacinto & Billrick Stable	7 1/2 furlongs	1:30.60	$22,825		

Legend:
All Weather Track Dirt Turf
Notes:
§ Ran as part of an entry

== See also ==
- List of American and Canadian Graded races
