= Las Virgenes Stakes =

American Thoroughbred horse race

- Class: Listed
- Location: Santa Anita Park; Arcadia, California, United States
- Inaugurated: 1983
- Race type: Thoroughbred – Flat racing
- Website: www.santaanita.com

Race information
- Distance: 1 mile
- Surface: Dirt
- Track: left-handed
- Qualification: Three-year-old fillies
- Weight: 124 lbs with allowances
- Purse: $100,000 (since 2024)

The Las Virgenes Stakes is a Listed American Thoroughbred horse race for three-year-old fillies over the distance of one mile on the dirt scheduled annually in late January or early February at Santa Anita Park in Arcadia, California. The event currently carries a purse of $100,000.

The event is part of the Road to the Kentucky Oaks.

== History ==
The event was named after the Rancho Las Virgenes land grant in the Santa Monica Mountains and Simi Hills. The event was inaugurated on 26 February 1983 with Saucy Bobbie victorious, who was ridden by US Hall of Fame jockey Laffit Pincay Jr. and trained by US Hall of Fame trainer Lazaro S. Barrera in a time of 1:36 1/5.

The event was scheduled in Southern California as a natural progression for three-year-old fillies with the Santa Ynez Stakes over 7 furlongs in January, Las Virgenes Stakes over one mile in February and the Santa Susana Stakes, later renamed as the Santa Anita Oaks over 1 1/16 miles in March.

Althea, winner of the second running in 1984 later that spring became the first filly to win the Arkansas Derby.

The event was upgraded to Grade III in 1985. The winner that year was Fran's Valentine who was first over the line in her first race, the inaugural 1984 Breeders' Cup Juvenile Fillies at Hollywood Park but was disqualified and place tenth. With the obvious quality of the runners in 1987 the event was upgraded to Grade II and the following year in 1988 the event reached Grade I status.

These include Goodbye Halo and Lite Light who went on to win the Kentucky Oaks and Coaching Club American Oaks. Serena's Song went on to defeat colts in the Jim Beam Stakes and Haskell Invitational Handicap en route to becoming US Champion Three-Year-Old Filly for 1995. The 2000 winner Surfside defeated older horses in the Grade II Clark Handicap also capturing US Champion Three-Year-Old Filly honors. The 2007 winner Rags to Riches became a US Classic winner when she won the Belmont Stakes and going on to capture US Champion Three-Year-Old Filly honors. The US Champion Two-Year-Old Filly Champion Beholder won this race and went on to win the 2013 Breeders' Cup Distaff and was named US Champion Three-Year-Old Filly that year.

In 2016 the event was downgraded to Grade II and again in 2021 to Grade III. In 2026 the event would again be downgraded to Listed.

== Records ==
Speed record:

- 1:34.86 – Zazu (2011)

Margins:

- 13 lengths – Adare Manor (2022)

Most wins by a jockey:

- 4 – Corey Nakatani (1991, 1995, 1997, 2005)
- 4 – Gary Stevens (1987, 1992, 1993, 2014)

Most wins by a trainer:

- 9 – Bob Baffert (1999, 2003, 2012, 2015, 2018, 2022, 2023, 2024, 2025)

Most wins by an owner:

- 3 – Robert & Beverly Lewis (1995, 2003, 2004)
- 3 – Spendthrift Farm (2013, 2015, 2021)
- 3 – Michael Lund Peterson (2022, 2023, 2024)

Las Virgenes Stakes – Santa Anita Oaks double:

- Althea †(1984), Fran's Valentine †(1985), Timely Assertion (1987), Lite Light (1991), Lakeway (1994), Serena's Song (1995), Antespend (1996), Sharp Cat (1997), Excellent Meeting (1999), Surfside (2000), Golden Ballet (2001), You (2002), Composure (2003), Balance (2006), Rags to Riches (2007), Stardom Bound (2009), Beholder (2013), Fashion Plate (2014), Songbird (2016), Bellafina (2019)

Notes:
† Santa Anita Oaks was known as the Santa Susana Stakes.

== Winners ==
Year	Winner	Jockey	Trainer	Owner	Distance	Time	Purse	Grade	Ref
2026	Meaning	Flavien Prat	Michael W. McCarthy	Bridlewood Farm & Eclipse Thoroughbred Partners	1 mile	1:38.39	$98,000	Listed	
2025	Tenma	Juan J. Hernandez	Bob Baffert	Baoma Corp	1 mile	1:38.31	$92,000	III	
2024	Kinza	Juan J. Hernandez	Bob Baffert	Michael Lund Peterson	1 mile	1:37.03	$100,000	III	
2023	Faiza	Ramon Vazquez	Bob Baffert	Michael Lund Peterson	1 mile	1:38.46	$200,000	III	
2022	Adare Manor	John Velazquez	Bob Baffert	Michael Lund Peterson	1 mile	1:37:11	$200,000	III	
2021	Moonlight d'Oro	Flavien Prat	Richard E. Mandella	MyRacehorse & Spendthrift Farm	1 mile	1:38:01	$200,000	III	
2020	Venetian Harbor	Flavien Prat	Richard Baltas	Ciaglia Racing, Highland Yard, River Oak Farm & Domenic Savides	1 mile	1:37.51	$200,000	II	
2019	Bellafina	Flavien Prat	Simon Callaghan	Kaleem Shah	1 mile	1:35.99	$200,000	II	
2018	Dream Tree	Drayden Van Dyke	Bob Baffert	Phoenix Thoroughbred	1 mile	1:39.45	$200,345	II	
2017	Unique Bella	Mike E. Smith	Jerry Hollendorfer	Don Alberto Stable	1 mile	1:35.66	$196,000	II	
2016	Songbird	Mike E. Smith	Jerry Hollendorfer	Fox Hill Farms	1 mile	1:36.84	$300,345	II	
2015	Callback	Martin Garcia	Bob Baffert	Spendthrift Farm	1 mile	1:36.92	$301,000	I	
2014	Fashion Plate	Gary L. Stevens	Simon Callaghan	Arnold Zetcher & Michael Tabor	1 mile	1:37.22	$300,000	I	
2013	Beholder	Garrett K. Gomez	Richard E. Mandella	Spendthrift Farm	1 mile	1:36.14	$250,750	I	
2012	Eden's Moon	Martin Garcia	Bob Baffert	Kaleem Shah	1 mile	1:35.27	$250,000	I	
2011	Zazu	Joel Rosario	John W. Sadler	Ann & Jerry Moss	1 mile	1:34.86	$250,000	I	
2010	Blind Luck	Rafael Bejarano	Jerry Hollendorfer	Mark DeDomenico, John Carver & Jerry Hollendorfer	1 mile	1:35.98	$250,000	I	
2009	Stardom Bound	Mike E. Smith	Robert J. Frankel	IEAH Stables, Paul Pompa Jr., Michael Dubb & Golden Goose Ent.	1 mile	1:36.43	$300,000	I	
2008	Golden Doc A	Rafael Bejarano	Barry Abrams	Ron McCauley	1 mile	1:35.86	$250,000	I	
2007	Rags to Riches	Garrett K. Gomez	Michael W. McCarthy	Derrick Smith & Michael Tabor	1 mile	1:37.85	$250,000	I	
2006	Balance	Victor Espinoza	David E. Hofmans	Amerman Racing	1 mile	1:36.54	$250,000	I	
2005	Sharp Lisa	Corey Nakatani	Doug F. O'Neill	J. Paul Reddam, Suarez Racing & Mark Schlesinger	1 mile	1:35.64	$250,000	I	
2004	A. P. Adventure	Alex O. Solis	Wallace Dollase	Robert & Beverly Lewis	1 mile	1:36.50	$250,000	I	
2003	Composure	Jerry D. Bailey	Bob Baffert	Robert & Beverly Lewis	1 mile	1:36.13	$200,000	I	
2002	You	Jerry D. Bailey	Robert J. Frankel	Edmund A. Gann	1 mile	1:38.84	$200,000	I	
2001	Golden Ballet	Chris McCarron	Jenine Sahadi	Team Valor & Heiligbrodt Racing Stable	1 mile	1:36.89	$200,000	I	
2000	Surfside	Pat Day	D. Wayne Lukas	Overbrook Farm	1 mile	1:37.00	$196,000	I	
1999	Excellent Meeting	Kent J. Desormeaux	Bob Baffert	Golden Eagle Farm	1 mile	1:35.35	$200,000	I	
1998	Keeper Hill	David R. Flores	Robert J. Frankel	Dr. John A. Chandler	1 mile	1:36.94	$200,000	I	
1997	Sharp Cat	Corey Nakatani	D. Wayne Lukas	The Thoroughbred Corp.	1 mile	1:35.52	$158,800	I	
1996	Antespend	Chris Antley	Ron McAnally	Jack Kent Cooke	1 mile	1:36.45	$156,900	I	
1995	Serena's Song	Corey Nakatani	D. Wayne Lukas	Robert & Beverly Lewis	1 mile	1:35.46	$160,200	I	
1994	Lakeway	Kent J. Desormeaux	Gary F. Jones	Mike Rutherford	1 mile	1:35.14	$161,100	I	
1993	Likeable Style	Gary L. Stevens	Richard E. Mandella	Golden Eagle Farm	1 mile	1:36.67	$158,500	I	
1992	Magical Maiden	Gary L. Stevens	Warren Stute	Clement L. Hirsch	1 mile	1:36.23	$164,300	I	
1991	Lite Light	Corey Nakatani	Henry Moreno	Jack L. Finley	1 mile	1:35.60	$161,300	I	
1990	Cheval Volant	Alex O. Solis	Kenneth J. Jumps	Kenneth J. Jumps, Steve Shapiro, David Stark & Bill Stratton	1 mile	1:38.00	$134,400	I	
1989	Kool Arrival	Laffit Pincay Jr.	Melvin F. Stute	John Coelho, Phillip Fields & Peter Valenti	1 mile	1:36.20	$133,450	I	
1988	Goodbye Halo	Jorge Velasquez	Charles E. Whittingham	Arthur B. Hancock III	1 mile	1:36.80	$126,500	I	
1987	Timely Assertion	Gary L. Stevens	Henry Moreno	George Aubin	1 mile	1:36.80	$126,600	II	
1986	Life At The Top	Rafael Q. Meza	D. Wayne Lukas	Lloyd R. French Jr. & Eugene V. Klein	1 mile	1:36.20	$131,050	III	
1985	Fran's Valentine	Pat Valenzuela	Joseph Manzi	Green Thumb Farm Stable	1 mile	1:36.40	$133,650	III	
1984	Althea	Laffit Pincay Jr.	D. Wayne Lukas	David Aykroyd, Helen Alexander & Helen Groves	1 mile	1:37.00	$86,600	Listed	
1983	Saucy Bobbie	Laffit Pincay Jr.	Laz Barrera	Leslie Combs II & Francis Kernan	1 mile	1:36.20	$83,850		

Legend:
All Weather Track Dirt

== See also ==
- Road to the Kentucky Oaks
- List of American and Canadian Graded races
