= Lite Light =

American-bred Thoroughbred racehorse

- Sire: Majestic Light
- Dam: Printing Press
- Damsire: In Reality
- Sex: Filly
- Foaled: 1988
- Country: United States
- Colour: Bay
- Breeder: Dr. & Mrs. R. Smiser West; Mr. & Mrs. M. Miller
- Owner: 1) Jack L. Finley; 2) Oaktown Stable
- Trainer: Henry M. Moreno; Jerry Hollendorfer
- Record: 26: 8-3-4
- Earnings: $1,231,596

Major wins
- Oak Leaf Stakes (1990); Sorrento Stakes (1990); Fantasy Stakes (1991); Las Virgenes Stakes (1991); Santa Anita Oaks (1991); Kentucky Oaks (1991); Coaching Club American Oaks (1991)
- Last updated on March 24, 2010

Lite Light (February 2, 1988 – May 5, 2007) was an American Thoroughbred racehorse.

== Background ==
A daughter of Majestic Light, Lite Light counts Nearco and Princequillo among her ancestors. She was owned by Jack L. Finley at age two and into the early phases of her three-year-old campaign before being purchased by rap music star MC Hammer and raced under his Oaktown Stable banner.

== Racing career ==
At age two, Lite Light raced at tracks in California where she won the Oak Leaf Stakes and the Sorrento Stakes and was second in the Del Mar Debutante Stakes and the Hollywood Starlet Stakes. In 1991, she blossomed into one of the top three-year-old fillies racing in the United States. After winning several important Grade I stakes events on the West Coast and the Grade II Fantasy Stakes at Oaklawn Park in Hot Springs, Arkansas, Lite Light went to Louisville, Kentucky, where she won the Kentucky Oaks against some of the best fillies in the country.

Sent north to race in New York, in the 1 1/8 miles (1.8 km) Mother Goose Stakes Lite Light was up against Meadow Star, whom she had lost to by a wide margin in the 1990 Breeders' Cup Juvenile Fillies. In the Mother Goose, after the two ran head-to-head from the turn at the top of the homestretch, Meadow Star won by a "lip" in a photo finish that took the officials six minutes to adjudicate. The two fillies finished 15 1/2 lengths in front of the rest of the field. A month later, they met again in the Coaching Club American Oaks. Once again they pulled away from the field, going head-to-head at the top of the stretch. But this time Lite Light put on a powerful drive and won by seven lengths in stakes record time. The victory was the last one of her career. Lite Light raced ten more times, coming in second in an allowance race and finishing no better than third in stakes events.

== Retirement ==
MC Hammer's financial difficulties eventually forced the sale of his stable. Lite Light retired after racing at age five to serve as a broodmare. At age 19, she suffered a rupture of her uterine artery during a delivery. The injury was so extensive that Lite Light was euthanized.
