= Oak Leaf Stakes =

- Class: Grade II
- Location: Santa Anita Park; Arcadia, California, United States
- Inaugurated: 1969
- Race type: Thoroughbred – Flat racing
- Website: www.santaanita.com

Race information
- Distance: 1 1/16 miles (8.5 furlongs)
- Surface: Pro-Ride synthetic dirt
- Track: left-handed
- Qualification: Two-year-old fillies
- Weight: Assigned
- Purse: US$200,000 (2021)

The Chandelier Stakes is an American Thoroughbred horse race held annually at the end of September at Santa Anita Park in Arcadia, California. It is restricted to two-year-old fillies. The Grade II race is contested at a distance of one and one-sixteenth miles on the main track at Santa Anita Park in Arcadia, California.

The race is currently part of the Breeders' Cup Challenge series. The winner will automatically qualify for the Breeders' Cup Juvenile Fillies.

As of 2012, this race was renamed the Chandelier Stakes having formerly being referred to as the Oak Leaf Stakes.

From 1997 through 2001, the race was run at a distance of one mile (8 furlongs).

As of 2020 the race was downgraded to Group II.

In 2024 the event was renamed back to its original name - Oak Leaf Stakes.

== Records ==
Speed record:

- 1:41.20 – It's In The Air (1978)

Most wins by a jockey:

- 5 – Chris McCarron (1983, 1986, 1987, 1988, 1992)

Most wins by a trainer:

- 14 – Bob Baffert (1997, 1998, 1999, 2000, 2002, 2005, 2007, 2012, 2013, 2016, 2019, 2020, 2024, 2025)

Most wins by an owner:

- 2 – Barry Beal & Lloyd French Jr. (1982, 1986)
- 2 – Bob & Beverly Lewis (1994, 2002)
- 2 – Golden Eagle Farm (1998, 2000)

== Winners ==
=== Oak Leaf Stakes ===
| Year | Winner | Jockey | Trainer | Owner | Time |
|---|---|---|---|---|---|
| 2026 | Domain Expansion | Adrian Escobedo | Leonard Powell | California Racing Partners, Ciaglia Racing LLC, Allen R. Keith and Kevin O'Donnell | 1:44.44 |
| 2025 | Explora | Juan J. Hernandez | Bob Baffert | Michael E. Pegram, Karl Watson and Paul Weitman | 1:44.13 |
| 2024 | Non Compliant | Juan Hernandez | Bob Baffert | Hunt, Georgia Antley, Giglio, Jeff and Rogitz, John L. | 1:45.08 |
| 2011 | Weemissfrankie | Rafael Bejarano | Peter Eurton | S.Alesia/Bran Jam Stable/Ciaglia Racing & Dyrdek | 1:42.92 |
| 2010‡ | Rigoletta | David Flores | Dan Hendricks | Thor-Bred Stable | 1:44.03 |
| 2009 | Blind Luck | Tyler Baze | Jerry Hollendorfer | DeDomenico/Hollendorfer/Carver | 1:43.19 |
| 2008 | Stardom Bound | Mike E. Smith | Christopher Paasch | Charles Cono | 1:42.44 |
| 2007 | Cry and Catch Me | Mike E. Smith | Bob Baffert | Stetson Land & Cattle | 1:42.91 |
| 2006 | Cash Included | Corey Nakatani | Craig Dollase | J. Paul Reddam | 1:42.86 |
| 2005 | Diamond Omi | David Flores | Bob Baffert | Donald Dizney | 1:45.57 |
| 2004 | Sweet Catomine | Corey Nakatani | Julio C. Canani | Pam & Martin Wygod | 1:42.98 |
| 2003 | Halfbridled | Julie Krone | Richard Mandella | Wertheimer et Frère | 1:43.72 |
| 2002 | Composure | Mike E. Smith | Bob Baffert | Bob & Beverly Lewis | 1:42.65 |
| 2001 | Tali'sluckybusride | Jose Valdivia Jr. | Alfredo Marquez | Ronald & Susie Anson | 1:37.77 |
| 2000 | Notable Career | David Flores | Bob Baffert | Golden Eagle Farm | 1:36.34 |
| 1999 | Chilukki | David Flores | Bob Baffert | Stonerside Stable | 1:36.12 |
| 1998 | Excellent Meeting | Kent Desormeaux | Bob Baffert | Golden Eagle Farm | 1:37.73 |
| 1997 | Vivid Angel | Ed Delahoussaye | Bob Baffert | Ed & Natalie Friendly | 1:37.33 |
| 1996 | City Band | Julio A. Garcia | D. Wayne Lukas | Overbrook Farm | 1:44.57 |
| 1995 | Tipically Irish | Laffit Pincay Jr. | D. Wayne Lukas | Michael Tabor | 1:42.60 |
| 1994 | Serena's Song | Corey Nakatani | D. Wayne Lukas | Bob & Beverly Lewis | 1:41.83 |
| 1993 | Phone Chatter | Laffit Pincay Jr. | Richard Mandella | Herman Sarkowsky | 1:41.78 |
| 1992 | Zoonaqua | Chris McCarron | Brian A. Mayberry | Ann & Jerry Moss | 1:43.91 |
| 1991 | Pleasant Stage | Ed Delahoussaye | Christopher Speckert | Buckland Farm | 1:43.53 |
| 1990 | Lite Light | Russell Baze | Henry M. Moreno | Jack L. Finley | 1:42.80 |
| 1989 | Dominant Dancer | Eddie Delahoussaye | Donald E. Harper | Yale Farar & Jamie Schloss | 1:44.60 |
| 1988 | One of a Klein | Chris McCarron | D. Wayne Lukas | M/M Eugene V. Klein | 1:44.00 |
| 1987 | Dream Team | Chris McCarron | D. Wayne Lukas | Eugene V. Klein | 1:44.40 |
| 1986 | Sacahuista | Chris McCarron | D. Wayne Lukas | B. Beal & L. French Jr. | 1:44.60 |
| 1985 | Arewehavingfunyet | Pat Valenzuela | D. Wayne Lukas | Spendthrift Farm | 1:44.60 |
| 1984 | Folk Art | Laffit Pincay Jr. | Neil D. Drysdale | Carter/Farish III/Hudson | 1:42.60 |
| 1983 | Life's Magic | Chris McCarron | D. Wayne Lukas | Melvin E. Hatley | 1:44.40 |
| 1982 | Landaluce | Laffit Pincay Jr. | D. Wayne Lukas | B. Beal & L. French Jr. | 1:41.80 |
| 1981 | Header Card | Darrel McHargue | David C. Kassen | Glen Hill Farm | 1:43.00 |
| 1980 | Astrious | Terry Lipham | Jerry M. Fanning | Steigler, Tannyhill, Wells & Weinstein | 1:43.80 |
| 1979 | Bold 'n Determined | Ángel Cordero Jr. | Neil D. Drysdale | Saron Stable | 1:46.20 |
| 1978 | It's In the Air | Ed Delahoussaye | Laz Barrera | Harbor View Farm | 1:41.20 |
| 1977 | B. Thoughtful | Darrel McHargue | Robert L. Wheeler | Bohm & Wheeler | 1:43.80 |
| 1976 | Any Time Girl | Randy Schacht | Jake Battles | M/M Wilbur & Marianne Stadelman | 1:44.00 |
| 1975 | Answer | Michael Hole | James E. Picou | Marcia W. Schott | 1:44.20 |
| 1974 | Cut Class | Fernando Toro | Joseph S. Dunn | M/M Douglas Carver | 1:42.80 |
| 1973 | Divine Grace | Steve Valdez | Randy Sechrest | Betty or Randy Sechrest | 1:43.60 |
| 1972 | Fresh Pepper | Jerry Lambert | Gordon C. Campbell | Elmendorf | 1:43.80 |
| 1971 | Sporting Lass | Fernando Alvarez | William T. Canney | Louis R. Rowan | 1:44.00 |
| 1970 | June Darling | William Mahorney | Warren Stute | Clement L. Hirsch | 1:43.20 |
| 1969 | Opening Bid | Rudy Rosales | Louis Glauburg | Mr. & Mrs. John J. Elmore | 1:43.60 |

=== Chandelier Stakes ===
| Year | Winner | Jockey | Trainer | Owner | Time |
|---|---|---|---|---|---|
| 2023 | Chatalas | Antonio Fresu | Mark Glatt | Rancho Temescal Thoroughbreds & Dan Agnew | 1:44.28 |
| 2022 | And Tell Me Nolies | Ramon Vazquez | Peter Miller | Peter Redekop B.C., Ltd | 1:46.15 |
| 2021 | Ain't Easy | Joel Rosario | Philip D'Amato | Old Bones Racing Stable, Michael Lombardi and Joey Platts | 1:45.20 |
| 2020 | Princess Noor | Victor Espinoza | Bob Baffert | Zedan Racing Stables, Inc. | 1:45.59 |
| 2019 | Bast | John Velazquez | Bob Baffert | Baoma Corporation | 1:46.10 |
| 2018 | Bellafina | Flavien Prat | Simon Callaghan | Kaleem Shah, Inc. | 1:44.59 |
| 2017 | Moonshine Memories | Flavien Prat | Simon Callaghan | Bridlewood Farm, Magnier, Tabor, et al. | 1:46.32 |
| 2016 | Noted and Quoted | Rafael Bejarano | Bob Baffert | Speedway Stable | 1:44.88 |
| 2015 | Songbird | Mike E. Smith | Jerry Hollendorfer | Fox Hill Farms | 1:43.79 |
| 2014 | Angela Renee | Rafael Bejarano | Todd Pletcher | Siena Farm | 1:43.45 |
| 2013 | Secret Compass | Rosie Napravnik | Bob Baffert | Westrock Stables | 1:44.91 |
| 2012 | Executiveprivilege | Rafael Bejarano | Bob Baffert | Watson/Pegram/Weitman | 1:44.95 |

‡ In 2010 run at Hollywood Park.

== See also ==
- Road to the Kentucky Oaks
