= Tempera (horse) =

American-bred Thoroughbred racehorse

- Sire: A.P. Indy
- Grandsire: Seattle Slew
- Dam: Colour Chart
- Damsire: Mr. Prospector
- Sex: Filly
- Foaled: 1999
- Country: United States
- Colour: Dark Bay/Brown
- Breeder: Darley Stud Management LLC
- Owner: Godolphin Stable
- Trainer: Eoin G. Harty
- Record: 7: 3-2-2
- Earnings: US$770,240

Major wins
- Sorrento Stakes (2001); Breeders' Cup wins: Breeders' Cup Juvenile Fillies (2001)

Awards
- American Champion Two-Year-Old Filly (2001)

Tempera (March 12, 1999 – April 28, 2002) was an American Thoroughbred racehorse.

== Background ==
She was sired by U.S. Racing Hall of Fame inductee and two-time leading sire in North America A.P. Indy who was a son of the 1977 United States Triple Crown of Thoroughbred Racing champion, Seattle Slew. Tempera's American-bred dam, Colour Chart, a daughter of the outstanding sire Mr. Prospector, was raced in France by Sheikh Mohammed where she won the 1990 Prix de l'Opéra and Prix de la Nonette.

== Racing career ==
=== 2001: two-year-old season ===
In 2001 Tempera Breeders' Cup Juvenile Fillies and was voted American Champion Two-Year-Old Filly.

=== 2002: three-year-old season ===
At age three, Tempera made two starts at Nad Al Sheba Racecourse in Dubai. She ran second in the March 14, 2002 UAE 1000 Guineas then finished second again in the April 13 UAE Oaks.

Sent to Churchill Downs in Louisville, Kentucky, on April 26 Tempera developed a fever and was sent to Hagyard-Davidson-McGee veterinary clinic near Lexington, Kentucky where her condition deteriorated as she developed colitis and laminitis. She was humanely euthanized during the evening of April 28, 2002.

Race Record
Date	Track	Race	Distance (Furlongs)	Finish
6/10/2001	Hollywood Park	Maiden	5	3
7/4/2001	Hollywood Park	Maiden	5 ½	1
8/4/2001	Del Mar	Sorrento Stakes	6 ½	1
8/26/2001	Del Mar	Del Mar Debutante	1	3
10/27/2001	Belmont Park	Breeders' Cup Juvenile Fillies	8 ½	1
3/14/2002	Nad Al Sheba	UAE 1000 Guineas	8*	2
4/13/2002	Nad Al Sheba	UAE Oaks	9*	2

*race in meters, approx in furlongs
