= Landaluce =

American-bred Thoroughbred racehorse

- Sire: Seattle Slew
- Grandsire: Bold Reasoning
- Dam: Strip Poker
- Damsire: Bold Bidder
- Sex: Filly
- Foaled: 1980
- Country: United States
- Color: Brown
- Breeder: Spendthrift Farm
- Owner: Lloyd R. French & Barry Beal
- Trainer: D. Wayne Lukas
- Record: 5: 5-0–0
- Earnings: $372,365

Major wins
- Hollywood Lassie Stakes (1982); Del Mar Debutante Stakes (1982); Oak Leaf Stakes (1982)

Awards
- American Champion Two-Year-Old Filly (1982)

Honors
- Landaluce Stakes at Santa Anita Park

Landaluce (April 11, 1980 – November 28, 1982) was a champion American Thoroughbred race horse. She was out of the first crop sired by Seattle Slew, 1977's Horse of the Year and the 10th winner of America's Triple Crown. Her dam was Strip Poker, by Bold Bidder, sired by Bold Ruler.

== History ==
Bred by Francis Kernan in Kentucky on Spendthrift Farm, the yearling Landaluce was chosen at auction for buyers Lloyd French and Barry Beal by Hall of Fame trainer D. Wayne Lukas. Her price tag was $650,000. Lukas said he noticed her "tremendous heart girth". Beal and French named their new filly after a guide on a Spanish ranch they had once visited, Francisco Landaluce.

Racing only at two, during that year Landaluce started five times and won each race. Her combined winning margin was 46½ lengths, 21 of those lengths coming in the Grade II Hollywood Lassie Stakes.

She debuted at Hollywood Park Racetrack on July 3, 1982, winning a six-furlong Maiden Special Weight in a time of 1:08 1/5. Her jockey was Hall of Famer Laffit Pincay, Jr. After riding her once, Pincay chose to continue riding her.

On July 10, Landaluce won the six-furlong Hollywood Lassie by 21 lengths in 1:08 flat. Her margin of victory remains the largest ever run in any race by a two-year-old at Hollywood Park. At Del Mar Racetrack on September 5, Landaluce won the one-mile Del Mar Debutante Stakes. She then went to Santa Anita Park for the October 11 running of the seven-furlong Grade II Anoakia Stakes, which she won by eight lengths.

Her last race, and her last victory, was the one-and- one-sixteenth-mile Grade I Oak Leaf Stakes at Santa Anita.

Lukas began preparing her for the Grade I Hollywood Starlet Stakes, scheduled to run on November 28. However, on November 22, Landaluce became ill with colitis X, a disease that had nearly killed her sire. Landaluce steadily weakened from the blood clots formed by the severe bacterial invasion and died on November 28, 1982.

Landaluce was posthumously awarded the American Champion Two-Year-Old Filly for 1982. The Hollywood Lassie Stakes was renamed the Landaluce Stakes in her honor, and she was buried in the infield at Hollywood Park. After the closure of Hollywood Park in 2014, her remains were moved to Spendthrift Farm in Kentucky.

== See also ==
- List of Undefeated horses
