= Halo Dolly =

American-bred Thoroughbred racehorse

Halo Dolly is a retired thoroughbred race horse sired by California sire, Popular, out of an un-raced mare named Spanish Halo. She was foaled in 2008 and was purchased by Jerry Hollendorfer after an impressive maiden win in her third race as a three-year-old. She was owned by a partnership including Hollendorfer, George Todaro, Dan Hoeflin, Michael O'Farrell, Charlie Robin and Brett Tahajian.

She went on to win $1,016,466 in a career that spanned 40 races with 18 wins. She was a grade 2 and grade 3 winner. She was voted 2012 Champion California-bred Older Female and retired in July 2014. She was purchased at the Keeneland Breeding stock sale in November 2014 for $300,000 by Spendthrift Farm. In 2021 she was sold again at Keenland for $110,00 to Milfer Farm.
