= Chilukki =

American-bred Thoroughbred racehorse

- Sire: Cherokee Run
- Grandsire: Runaway Groom
- Dam: Song of Syria
- Damsire: Damascus
- Sex: Mare
- Foaled: 1997
- Country: United States
- Colour: Dark Bay/Brown
- Breeder: Dr. R. Smiser West & MacKenzie Miller
- Owner: Stonerside Stable
- Trainer: Bob Baffert
- Record: 17: 11-3-0
- Earnings: US$1,201,828

Major wins
- Churchill Downs Debutante Stakes (1999); Del Mar Debutante Stakes (1999); Kentucky Breeders' Cup Stakes (1999); Oak Leaf Stakes (1999); Sorrento Stakes (1999); Churchill Downs Distaff Handicap (2000); Monmouth Regret Stakes (2000); El Encino Stakes (2001)

Awards
- American Champion Two-Year-Old Filly (1999)

Honours
- Chilukki Stakes at Churchill Downs

Chilukki (1997–2007) was an American Champion Thoroughbred racehorse, who during her racing career set two track records at Churchill Downs. She was bred in Kentucky by Dr. R. Smiser West and U.S. Racing Hall of Fame trainer MacKenzie Miller.

== Background ==
Chilukki was out of the mare Song of Syria, a daughter of U.S. Racing Hall of Fame inductee Damascus. Sired by Cherokee Run, winner of the 1994 Breeders' Cup Sprint. The name Chilukki is taken from the Cherokee language term used by the Cherokee nation to describe themselves as dog people.

Purchased by Bob McNair's Stonerside Stable at the 1999 Fasig-Tipton Two-Year-Olds in Training Sale in Florida, Chilukki was conditioned for racing by Bob Baffert.

== Racing career ==
The filly had a brilliant two-year-old racing season, in which she set a Churchill Downs track record for 4.5 furlongs on April 28, 1999. Her multiple wins that year included two Grade I stakes and she went into the 1999 Breeders' Cup Juvenile Fillies undefeated. However, she finished second to the 33-1 long-shot Cash Run. Despite this loss, Chilukki was voted the Eclipse Award as the American Champion Two-Year-Old Filly.

In 2000, the three-year-old Chilukki continued to win and set another new track record at Churchill downs in the one mile Churchill Downs Distaff Handicap, a race that was later renamed in her honor. Raced at age four, Chilukki won the January 2001 El Encino Stakes.

== Breeding record ==
In March 2001 she was retired to serve as a broodmare at her owner's farm in Paris, Kentucky.

Chilukki died on May 7, 2007, at the Hagyard Equine Medical Institute near Lexington, Kentucky following complications after giving birth to a foal by the 2004 World Champion runner Ghostzapper. She was buried in her entirety in Stonerside Farm's equine cemetery.
