= Champagne Room (horse) =

American-bred Thoroughbred racehorse

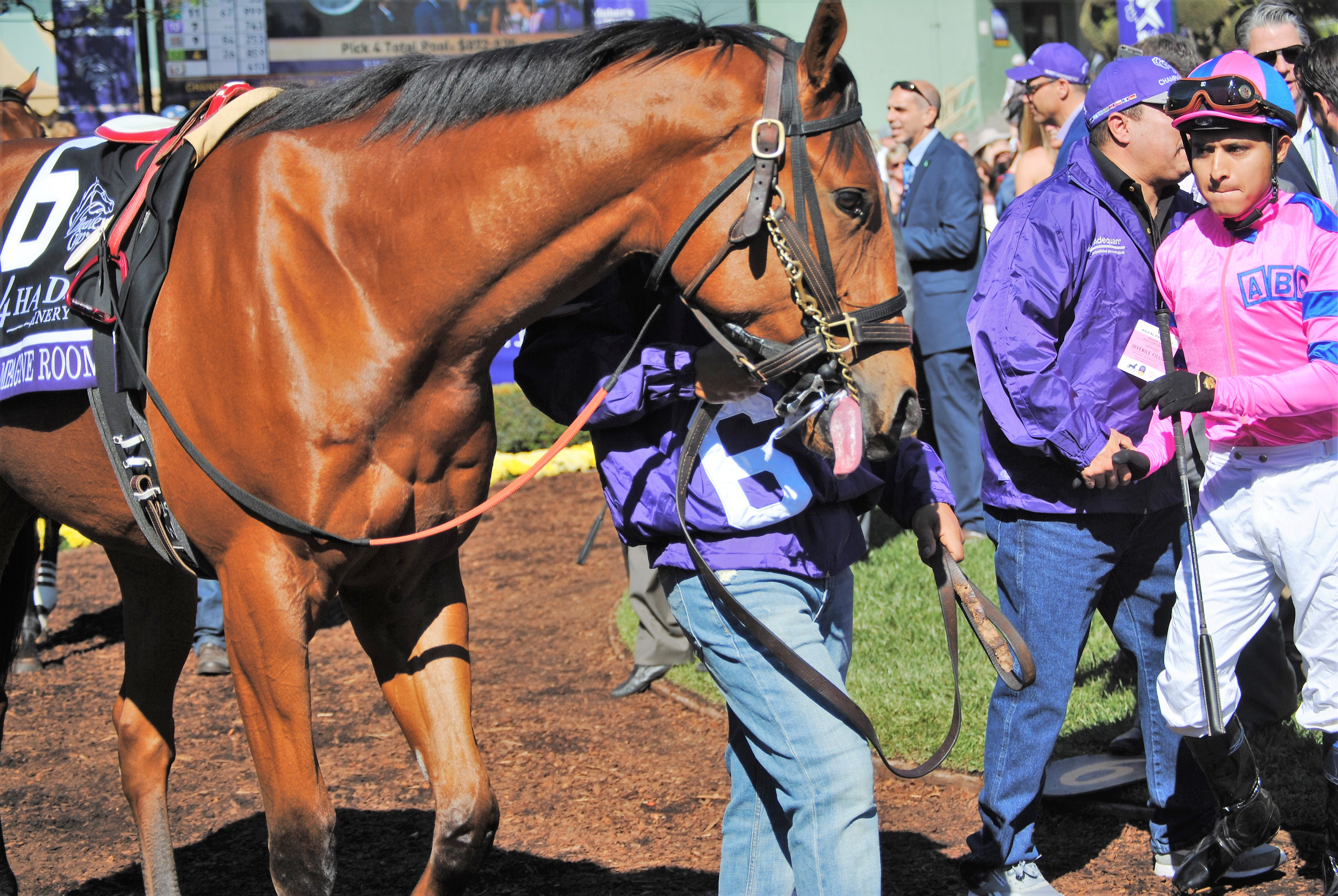
- Sire: Broken Vow
- Grandsire: Unbridled
- Dam: Lucky to Be Me
- Damsire: Bernstein
- Sex: Mare
- Foaled: February 5, 2014
- Country: United States
- Color: Bay
- Breeder: Respite Farm
- Owner: Alesia, Christensen, Ciaglia Racing LLC, Exline-Border Racing LLC, Gulliver Racing LLC
- Trainer: Peter Eurton
- Record: 9: 3–2–2
- Earnings: US $1,490,600

Major wins
- Sorrento Stakes (2016); Breeders' Cup Juvenile Fillies (2016); Remington Park Oaks (2017)

Awards
- American Champion Two-Year-Old Filly (2016)

Champagne Room (foaled February 5, 2014) is a retired American Thoroughbred racehorse, best known for winning the 2016 GI Breeders' Cup Juvenile Fillies as a 33-1 long-shot and for being named American Champion Two-Year-Old Filly of 2016.

== Background ==
Champagne Room is a strongly built bay mare with a star on her forehead and one coronet band on her right hind leg. She raced with Ciaglia Racing silks.

== 2016: two-year-old season ==
Champagne Room made her debut on July 16, 2016, in a 5-furlong Maiden Special Weight, where she finished 2nd as the favorite beaten 1 1/2 lengths by Morganite. She next moved up in graded competition in the GII Sorrento Stakes on August 6 which she won by 1 1/4 lengths over Miss Southern Miss. Then she went to the GI Del Mar Debutante takes on September 3, where she finished 3rd a nose behind second-place finisher American Cleopatra and 2 1/4 lengths behind the winner, Union Strike. She then finished a troubled 4th in the GI Chandelier Stakes on October 1. She then won the GI Breeders' Cup Juvenile Fillies on November 5 by 3/4 of a length over Valadorna, in which she was the 11th choice in a field of 12. Her trainer Peter Eurton said after the race "I wasn't feeling utterly confident when they were coming down the stretch, She was getting a little tired, but nobody was catching her. I'm feeling pretty good right now. This means an awful lot to me." Champagne Room was freshened following her win in the GI Breeders' Cup Juvenile Fillies, and returned to the work tab on December 15 where she breezed 3 furlongs in :35 1/5, Peter Eurton said after her breeze "It was a little bit quicker than I was looking for, but a horse broke off eight or 10 lengths in front of her and she's got pretty good eyesight, She went really well, well in hand. I knew she was going to be fresh; she's been happy to have the time off but she's more enthused to be back on the racetrack. She's content, Juan basically said she's stronger; he has been on her in the past, she is strong, she is big, she does look really very good right now. I think a lot of it has to do with the fact she hasn't been doing anything other than some gallops. She was in one of those moods where she wanted us to let her stretch out, and she could have gone so much faster, but that would have been scary. We wanted to keep it to a moderate roar." She would target the GII Las Virgenes Stakes on February 5, 2017, for her 3-year-old debut.

== 2017: three-year-old season ==
Champagne Room was named Champion Two-Year-Old Filly of 2016 with 202 votes, the horse closest to her in votes was New Money Honey with 21. She made her 3-year-old debut in the GII Las Virgenes Stakes on February 5, where she finished 3rd 1 1/4 lengths behind second-place finisher Mopotism and 10 lengths behind the winner, Unique Bella. It was announced in March that she had surgery to remove a small chip from her right front ankle on March 8. Champagne Room's co-owner Phil Bongiovanni said "She came out of the surgery great. She's eating well and everything was fine with the surgery, we've talked about whether we want to breed her right now or keep her in training. With the 90 days off, plus another three or four months, we're looking at a return in November already." Champagne Room was not retired and returned to the work tab on July 30, where she breezed 3 furlongs in :35 3/5 at Del Mar. She returned in the Remington Park Oaks on September 24, where she won easily by 3 3/4 lengths under a hand ride. She finished her year with a 6th in the GI Breeders' Cup Distaff on November 3 and a 2nd behind Majestic Heat in the GII Bayakoa Stakes on December 3.

== Retirement ==
As a 4-year-old Champagne Room was training for the GIII Houston Ladies Classic Stakes on January 28, but on January 19 it was announced that she had a hairline fracture in one of her coffin bones and might be retired. Then on January 24, 2018, Champagne Room was retired and sold to Japanese interests. Once she recovered, she was bred to 2015 Triple Crown winner American Pharoah.
