= Immersive (horse) =

- Immersive before the 2026 Fleur de Lis Stakes
- Sire: Nyquist
- Grandsire: Uncle Mo
- Dam: Gap Year
- Damsire: Bernardini
- Sex: Mare
- Foaled: March 5, 2022 (age 4); Kentucky
- Breeder: Godolphin Stables
- Owner: Godolphin Stables
- Trainer: Brad H. Cox
- Record: 12: 6-4-2
- Earnings: $2,367,400

Major wins
- Spinaway Stakes (2024); Alcibiades Stakes (2024); Breeders' Cup Juvenile Fillies (2024); Seneca Overnight Stakes (2025); Fleur de Lis Stakes (2026)

Awards
- 2024 American Champion Two-Year-Old Filly

Immersive (foaled March 5, 2022 in Kentucky) is an American Thoroughbred racehorse who won the 2024 Breeders’ Cup Juvenile Fillies and 2026 Fleur de Lis Stakes.

== Background ==
Immersive was sired by 2016 Kentucky Derby winner Nyquist and foaled by Gap Year, who was sired by Bernardini. She is owned by Godolphin Stables and trained by Brad Cox.

== Career ==
=== 2024 ===
On July 21, Immersive made her debut at Saratoga. She made her stakes debut the following race on August 31 in the Spinaway Stakes, followed by a win in the Alcibiades Stakes at Keeneland on October 4.

On November 1, she was entered into the Breeders’ Cup Juvenile Fillies at Del Mar, and would win. She would end her 2-year-old season undefeated in 4 starts, which won her the Eclipse Award for American Champion Two-Year-Old Filly of the year.

=== 2025 ===
Immersive would be sidelined for the first half of the year due to bone bruising.

In June, she would be defeated for the first time in the Monomoy Girl Overnight Stakes, finishing 2nd.

In July, she finished 2nd again in the Coaching Club American Oaks.

On September 20, she would win for the only time as a 3-year-old in the Seneca Overnight Stakes in her final start of the year.

=== 2026 ===
Immersive made her 4-year-old debut in the Distaff Stakes at Aqueduct on April 4, finishing 2nd, followed by another 2nd in the Shawnee Stakes on May 30.

On June 27, she was entered into the Fleur de Lis Stakes. She would win the race, qualifying her for the Breeders’ Cup Distaff on October 31.

On September 12, she ran in the Locus Grove Stakes, finishing 3rd, and would finish last of 3 horses in the Spinster Stakes at Keeneland on October 4.

== Results ==
Date	Track	Race	Finish
2 year old
7/21/2024	Saratoga	Maiden Special Weight	1st
8/31/2024	Saratoga	Spinaway Stakes	1st
10/4/2024	Keeneland	(Darley) Alcibiades Stakes	1st
11/1/2024	Del Mar	(NetJets) Breeders' Cup Juvenile Fillies	1st
3 year old
6/14/2025	Churchill Downs	Monomoy Girl Overnight Stakes	2nd
7/19/2025	Saratoga	Coaching Club American Oaks Invitational Stakes	2nd
9/20/2025	Churchill Downs	Seneca Overnight Stakes	1st
4 year old
4/4/2026	Aqueduct	Distaff Stakes	2nd
5/30/2026	Churchill Downs	Shawnee Stakes	2nd
6/27/2026	Churchill Downs	(Fasig-Tipton) Fleur de Lis Stakes	1st
9/12/2026	Churchill Downs	(Fasig-Tipton) Locust Grove Stakes	3rd
10/4/2026	Keeneland	(Juddmonte) Spinster Stakes	3rd

== Pedigree ==
Pedigree of Immersive (2022)
Sire Nyquist 2013	Uncle Mo; 2008	Indian Charlie	In Excess
Sire Nyquist 2013	Uncle Mo; 2008	Indian Charlie	Soviet Sojourn
Sire Nyquist 2013	Uncle Mo; 2008	Playa Maya	Arch
Sire Nyquist 2013	Uncle Mo; 2008	Playa Maya	Dixie Slippers
Sire Nyquist 2013	Seeking Gabrielle; 2007	Forestry	Storm Cat
Sire Nyquist 2013	Seeking Gabrielle; 2007	Forestry	Shared Interest
Sire Nyquist 2013	Seeking Gabrielle; 2007	Seeking Regina	Seeking The Gold
Sire Nyquist 2013	Seeking Gabrielle; 2007	Seeking Regina	Fulbright Scholar
Dam Gap Year 2012	Bernardini; 2003	A.P. Indy	Seattle Slew
Dam Gap Year 2012	Bernardini; 2003	A.P. Indy	Weekend Surprise
Dam Gap Year 2012	Bernardini; 2003	Cara Rafaela	Quiet American
Dam Gap Year 2012	Bernardini; 2003	Cara Rafaela	Oil Fable
Dam Gap Year 2012	Dubai Escapade; 2002	Awesome Again	Deputy Minister
Dam Gap Year 2012	Dubai Escapade; 2002	Awesome Again	Primal Force
Dam Gap Year 2012	Dubai Escapade; 2002	Sassy Pants	Saratoga Six
Dam Gap Year 2012	Dubai Escapade; 2002	Sassy Pants	Special Portion
