= Bast (horse) =

American thoroughbred racehorse

- Sire: Uncle Mo
- Grandsire: Indian Charlie
- Dam: Laffina
- Damsire: Arch
- Sex: Mare
- Foaled: 2017
- Country: USA
- Colour: Bay
- Breeder: BlackRidge Stables LLC
- Owner: Baoma Corporation
- Trainer: Bob Baffert
- Record: 6:4-1-1
- Earnings: $852,200

Major wins
- Del Mar Debutante Stakes (2019); Chandelier Stakes (2019); Starlet Stakes (2019); Santa Ynez Stakes (2020)
- Last updated on February 20, 2020

Bast (foaled January 19, 2017 ) is a retired American Thoroughbred racehorse and active broodmare, best known for winning the 2019 Del Mar Debutante Stakes, Chandelier Stakes, and Starlet Stakes.

== Background ==
Bast is a bay filly with no markings and was the first foal out of the Arch mare Laffina. She was sold as a weanling at the Keeneland November Sale, where she was purchased for $200,000 by Bloodstock Investments V, and was sold again as a yearling at the Fasig-Tipton New York Sale, where she was purchased by Baoma Corporation for $500,000.

== Career ==
Bast made her debut on August 11, 2019, at Del Mar in a 5 1/2-furlong Maiden Special Weight, where she finished second beaten by 1 1/4 lengths behind Inspiressa. She broke slowly, stalked in fourth position on the backstretch and turn, moved into second on the final turn and was clear of the third-place finisher by 4 1/2 lengths. Her next race was the Grade 1 Del Mar Debutante Stakes, on August 31, where she stalked most of the race before winning by 8 3/4 lengths with a final time of 1:23.73 for 7 furlongs.

She followed this major victory up with another Grade 1 win, when she won the Chandelier Stakes on September 27 at Santa Anita. She stayed in second most of the race before dueling Comical for the lead, prevailing by a neck. On November 1, she competed in the Breeders' Cup Juvenile Fillies, where she placed third behind British Idiom and Donna Veloce, beaten by 2 lengths. She finished out her 2019 season with a third Grade 1 victory, this time at Los Alamitos in the December 7 Starlet Stakes, besting rival Donna Veloce by half-a-length.

== 2020 season and retirement ==
She started her 2020 season on January 5, with a win at Santa Anita in the 7 furlong GII Santa Ynez Stakes. She stalked as usual and won under a tight hold by 1 3/4 lengths. It was announced on February 20, 2020, that Bast was retired due to a soft-tissue injury, after only 6 races.

In March 2020, Bast was bred by 2009 Florida Derby champion, Quality Road.

== Pedigree ==
Pedigree of Bast (USA), 2017
Sire Uncle Mo (USA) 2008	Indian Charlie (USA)	In Excess	Siberian Express
Sire Uncle Mo (USA) 2008	Indian Charlie (USA)	In Excess	Kantado
Sire Uncle Mo (USA) 2008	Indian Charlie (USA)	Soviet Sojourn	Leo Castelli
Sire Uncle Mo (USA) 2008	Indian Charlie (USA)	Soviet Sojourn	Political Parfait
Sire Uncle Mo (USA) 2008	Playa Maya (USA); 2000	Arch	Kris S.
Sire Uncle Mo (USA) 2008	Playa Maya (USA); 2000	Arch	Aurora
Sire Uncle Mo (USA) 2008	Playa Maya (USA); 2000	Dixie Slippers	Dixieland Band
Sire Uncle Mo (USA) 2008	Playa Maya (USA); 2000	Dixie Slippers	Cyane's Slippers
Dam Laffina (USA) 2012	Arch (USA); 1995	Kris S.	Roberto
Dam Laffina (USA) 2012	Arch (USA); 1995	Kris S.	Sharp Queen
Dam Laffina (USA) 2012	Arch (USA); 1995	Aurora	Danzig
Dam Laffina (USA) 2012	Arch (USA); 1995	Aurora	Althea
Dam Laffina (USA) 2012	St Lucinda (CAN); 1994	St Jovite	Pleasant Colony
Dam Laffina (USA) 2012	St Lucinda (CAN); 1994	St Jovite	Northern Sunset
Dam Laffina (USA) 2012	St Lucinda (CAN); 1994	Majestic Nature	Majestic Prince
Dam Laffina (USA) 2012	St Lucinda (CAN); 1994	Majestic Nature	Nature
