= Bellafina =

American thoroughbred racehorse

- Breed: Thoroughbred
- Sire: Quality Road
- Grandsire: Elusive Quality
- Dam: Akron Moon
- Damsire: Malibu Moon
- Sex: Mare
- Foaled: 2016
- Country: United States
- Color: Bay
- Breeder: JSM Equine, LLC.
- Owner: Kaleem Shah, Inc.
- Trainer: Simon Callaghan
- Record: 17: 7-5-1
- Earnings: $1,552,975

Major wins
- Sorrento Stakes (2018); Del Mar Debutante Stakes (2018); Chandelier Stakes (2018); Santa Ynez Stakes (2019); Las Virgenes Stakes (2019); Santa Anita Oaks (2019); Desert Stormer Stakes (2020)
- Last updated on August 13, 2020

Bellafina (foaled April 29, 2016) is an American Thoroughbred racehorse and the winner of the 2018 Del Mar Debutante Stakes.

== Career ==
Bellafina's first race was on July 4, 2018, where she was 2nd place at Los Alamitos. Bellafina's next race was on August 5, 2018, where she won the 2018 Sorrento Stakes.

Bellafina continued to win with victories at the 2018 Del Mar Debutante Stakes and the 2018 Chandelier Stakes.

Starting on January 6, 2019, Bellafina went on a three race win streak, picking up victories at the Santa Ynez Stakes, the Las Virgenes Stakes and the Santa Anita Oaks.
