= Twilight Ridge =

American-bred Thoroughbred racehorse

- Sire: Cox's Ridge
- Grandsire: Best Turn
- Dam: Waving Sky
- Damsire: Quibu
- Sex: Filly
- Foaled: 1983
- Country: United States
- Colour: Bay
- Breeder: Dr. Thomas E. Burrow
- Owner: Eugene Klein
- Trainer: D. Wayne Lukas
- Record: 15: 4-5-2

Major wins
- Astoria Stakes (1985) Breeders' Cup wins: Breeders' Cup Juvenile Fillies (1985)

Twilight Ridge (March 20, 1983 – April 2, 2013) was an American Thoroughbred racing filly. In 1985, she won the Breeders' Cup Juvenile Fillies. At the time of her death (age 30), she was the oldest living female Breeders' Cup winner. Her offspring brought $2,295,000 at auction.

== Pedigree ==
Pedigree of Twilight Ridge (USA), brown filly, 1983
Sire Cox's Ridge (USA) 1974	Best Turn (USA); 1966	Turn-To (USA)	Royal Charger (GB)
Sire Cox's Ridge (USA) 1974	Best Turn (USA); 1966	Turn-To (USA)	Source Sucree (FRA)
Sire Cox's Ridge (USA) 1974	Best Turn (USA); 1966	Sweet Clementine (USA)	Swaps (USA)
Sire Cox's Ridge (USA) 1974	Best Turn (USA); 1966	Sweet Clementine (USA)	Miz Clementine (USA)
Sire Cox's Ridge (USA) 1974	Our Martha (USA); 1961	Ballydonnell (USA)	Ballyogan (GB)
Sire Cox's Ridge (USA) 1974	Our Martha (USA); 1961	Ballydonnell (USA)	O'Donnell (GB)
Sire Cox's Ridge (USA) 1974	Our Martha (USA); 1961	Corday (USA)	Carrier Pigeon (USA)
Sire Cox's Ridge (USA) 1974	Our Martha (USA); 1961	Corday (USA)	Galleon Gold (USA)
Dam Waving Sky (USA) 1967	Quibu (ARG); 1942	Meadow (GB)	Fairway (GB)
Dam Waving Sky (USA) 1967	Quibu (ARG); 1942	Meadow (GB)	Silver Mist (GB)
Dam Waving Sky (USA) 1967	Quibu (ARG); 1942	Querendona (ARG)	Diadochos (GB)
Dam Waving Sky (USA) 1967	Quibu (ARG); 1942	Querendona (ARG)	Querella (ARG)
Dam Waving Sky (USA) 1967	Fading Sky (USA); 1958	Pry (USA)	Questionnaire (USA)
Dam Waving Sky (USA) 1967	Fading Sky (USA); 1958	Pry (USA)	Fantine (USA)
Dam Waving Sky (USA) 1967	Fading Sky (USA); 1958	Haze (USA)	Olympia (USA)
Dam Waving Sky (USA) 1967	Fading Sky (USA); 1958	Haze (USA)	Blue Castle (USA)
