= Brown Berry =

Ghanaian radio and TV presenter

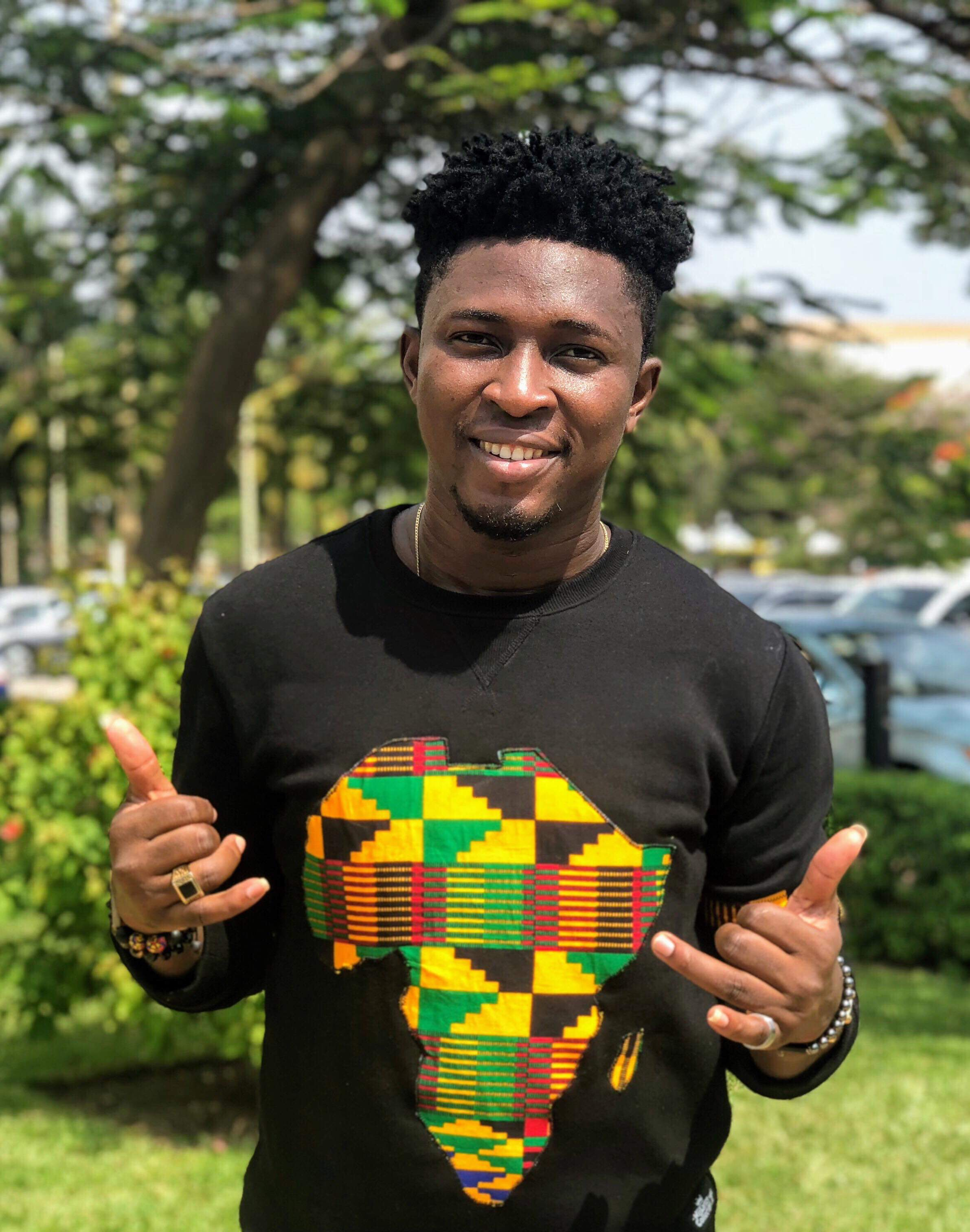
- Born: Joshua Kormla Senuvie volta Region, Ghana
- Education: Accra Academy, Choice Broadcast School, International Tavel and Tourism Institute
- Occupations: Radio Presenter, Television Presenter
- Years active: 2005
- Known for: YFM, Choice Fm, GH One Tv, TV7, Top TV, ETV Ghana, Zeex Music TV, ISocial TV
- Notable work: Weekend Rush, Brown Berry Show; Saturday Morning Live , Choice FM After Drive

Joshua Kormla Senuvie better known as Brown Berry is a Ghanaian Radio and TV Presenter. Born in the Volta Region and raised in the capital, Greater Accra Region, he rose to fame as an MC for the youth TV shows Fun World and Kiddafest. Having worked with countless youth related events and projects. Brown Berry hosts social TV which airs on Gh One and also a veejay for Zeex Music TV on Tv7, Top TV and ETv Ghana.

== Career ==
Before his self titled radio Brown Berry show, he served as the managing editor for Skuul Life Pocket Magazine between 2005 and 2008. In 2007 he officially joined choice fm as the host of the Brown Berry Show. After three years of successfully hosting his Sunday Afternoon show he was approached to take charge of the After Drive spot of the station.

Together with team of producers they took over the after drive show for two years and was moved to take charge of Highway 102 (the drive Time spot). After spending 8 years with choice fm, he moved to Yfm where he hosted the mid morning Saturday spot called Saturday Morning Live SML. His Time on the station was increased when YFm initiated the three day weekend seeing him host a new show called the Weekend Rush which airs Friday through to Sunday.

== Social works ==
=== Ghana Youth Walk ===
In 2011 while with choice fm, Brown Berry started the Ghana Youth Walk initiative to address issues affecting young people in the country. Together with volunteers and partners such as Ghana Aids commission, National Road Safety Commission, Narcotics Control Board and AIESEC they have been able to mobilize over 18,000 young Africans to raise awareness for HIV/AIDS, Peace and other social and national issues including road safety, drugs abuse and unemployment among young people and has since been launched outside of Accra across the country including Ashanti, Western and the Volta region .

=== Urban Youth Ghana ===
Brown Berry, while hosting After Drive at Choice Fm, decided to not just play music but educate his listeners to the potential that reside in Ghana; our young entrepreneurs. He worked in conjunction with the then number one online market place in Africa, Kaymu. The project he termed Urban Youth received rave reviews from young entrepreneurs interested in setting up their own businesses. According to Brown Berry, “Many of our youth see Entrepreneurship as a risk not worth taking due to an unfavoured business climate that seems to exclude young people and not take them seriously”.The Media host of urban youth plans to take the program out of the studio and on the road to educate young people in Ghana you can start a business without the huge sum of capital (money) that many young people lack.

=== Travel Club ===
In 2013 Brown Berry started the Travel Club with the aimed of promoting tourism in a fun and affordable way with his discovery trips across Ghana and other African countries.

== Nominations ==
Brown Berry was nominated in both the 2017 and 2018 RTP awards for Best male Entertainment TV show host (isocial TV), Best male Entertainment TV show host ( zeex music TV) and Best entertainment Show Host 2018(Zeex music TV)
