= Rafael Bejarano =

American jockey

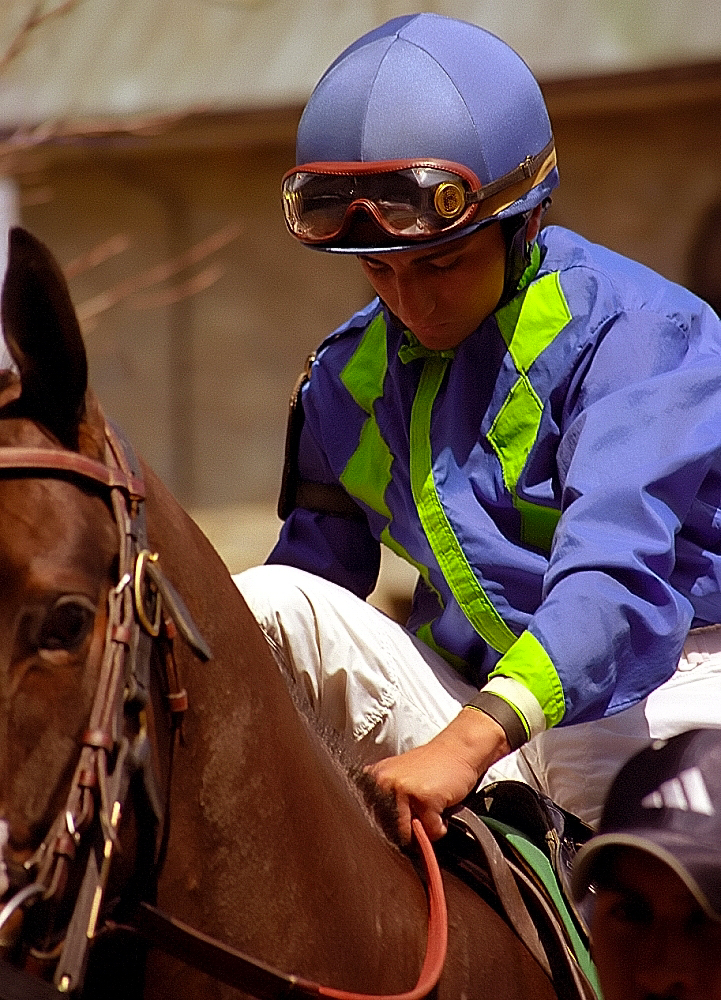
- Bejarano in 2007

Personal information
- Born: June 23, 1982 (age 44) Arequipa, Arequipa Province, Peru
- Occupation: Jockey

Horse racing career
- Sport: Horse racing
- Career wins: 4,483+ (ongoing)

Major racing wins
- Grade 1 Stakes wins: Apple Blossom Handicap (2012); Arkansas Derby (2013); Awesome Again Stakes (2012); Breeders' Futurity Stakes (2004, 2008); Bing Crosby Stakes (2011); Carter Handicap (2005); CashCall Futurity (2011); Chandelier Stakes (2011, 2012, 2014, 2016); Darley Alcibiades Stakes (2007, 2010); Del Mar Debutante Stakes (2011, 2012); Del Mar Futurity (2012, 2016); Eddie Read Stakes (2008, 2013); Frank E. Kilroe Mile Stakes (2011); FrontRunner Stakes (2012); Gamely Stakes (2008, 2010); Go for Wand Handicap (2007, 2008); Gold Cup at Santa Anita Stakes (2017); Gulfstream Park Breeders' Cup Stakes (2006); Haskell Invitational Stakes (2012); Hollywood Starlet Stakes (2007, 2009); Humana Distaff Stakes (2007); John C. Mabee Handicap (2007); Kentucky Oaks (2010); La Brea Stakes (2012); Las Virgenes Stakes (2008, 2010); Matriarch Stakes (2007); Ogden Phipps Handicap (2008); Personal Ensign Stakes (2008); Queen Elizabeth II Challenge Cup Stakes (2005); Ruffian Handicap (2007); Santa Anita Handicap (2008); Santa Anita Sprint Championship Stakes (2015); Santa Margarita Stakes (2016, 2017); Santa Maria Handicap (2008); Shadwell Turf Mile Stakes (2005); Shoemaker Mile Stakes (2015, 2016); Stephen Foster Handicap (2004); Test Stakes (2012); Toyota Blue Grass Stakes (2007); Triple Bend Stakes (2016); Woodford Reserve Turf Classic Stakes (2010); Yellow Ribbon Stakes (2010); Breeders' Cup wins: Breeders' Cup Filly & Mare Turf (2005); Breeders' Cup Distaff (2007); Breeders' Cup Juvenile Sprint (2011); Breeders' Cup Dirt Mile (2013, 2014)

Racing awards
- United States Champion Jockey by wins (2004)

Significant horses
- Intercontinental, Circular Quay, Dominican; Country Star, Ginger Punch, Square Eddie Papa Clem, Mildly Offensive (horse), Sarah's Secret (horse), Caracortado, Cupid
- Updated on April 18, 2007

Rafael Bejarano (born June 23, 1982) is a Pervuian jockey in American Thoroughbred horse racing. He trained at the Peruvian national riding school before embarking on his professional career in 1999. Having met with success, including winning the apprentice riding title at Hipódromo de Monterrico in Lima, he emigrated to the United States in the spring of 2002 and settled in Louisville, Kentucky. He got his first victory on July 10 that year at River Downs in Cincinnati, Ohio then went on to win major races in Kentucky and on the New York Racing Association circuit.

In 2004, Rafael Bejarano got his big break when he was the United States Champion Jockey by wins with 455. As part of his 2004 success, on March 12 at Turfway Park in Florence, Kentucky he won seven races on a single race card and ended the meet with a track-record 196 wins. In 2004, his earnings were just over $12 million out of 1,922 mounts finishing 8th in the national earnings list. In the American Classic Races, he finished eighth aboard Andromeda's Hero in the 2005 Kentucky Derby then rode him to a second-place finish in the Belmont Stakes In 2005 he finished the year with earnings of $14,436,781 with 263 winners and was 4th in the national earnings list. In the 2006 Derby he finished ninth on Point Determined. He first rode in the Preakness Stakes in 2004 and got his best result in 2005 with a fourth-place finish on Sun King.

In the 2007 Blue Grass Stakes Bejarano scored a dramatic upset win with Dominican, defeating the 2006 U.S. Champion 2-year-old colt, Street Sense. Bejarano also won the 2008 Track Meet at Santa Anita. He had a grand total of 67 wins. Also, he won the Hollywood Park meet and Del Mar meet as well.

Bejarano in 2008 swept all five of the major Southern California titles and for that he was a finalist for the Eclipse Award for Outstanding Jockey for 2008 but lost it. For his 2008 season he had 266 winners out of 1,290 mounts with earnings of $16,439,729.

In 2009, he won the Santa Anita and Oak Tree jockey titles then finished the 2009 year with 240 winners out of 1,129 mounts with earnings of $12,403,993.

== Year-end charts ==
| Chart (2003–present) | Rank by earnings |
|---|---|
| National Earnings List for Jockeys 2003 | 43 |
| National Earnings List for Jockeys 2004 | 8 |
| National Earnings List for Jockeys 2005 | 4 |
| National Earnings List for Jockeys 2006 | 10 |
| National Earnings List for Jockeys 2007 | 5 |
| National Earnings List for Jockeys 2008 | 4 |
| National Earnings List for Jockeys 2009 | 8 |
| National Earnings List for Jockeys 2010 | 5 |
| National Earnings List for Jockeys 2011 | 5 |
| National Earnings List for Jockeys 2012 | 4 |
| National Earnings List for Jockeys 2013 | 4 |
| National Earnings List for Jockeys 2014 | 9 |
| National Earnings List for Jockeys 2015 | 9 |
| National Earnings List for Jockeys 2016 | 12 |
| National Earnings List for Jockeys 2017 | 24 |
| National Earnings List for Jockeys 2018 | 53 |
| National Earnings List for Jockeys 2019 | 26 |
| National Earnings List for Jockeys 2020 | 36 |
