= Del Mar Debutante Stakes =

- Class: Grade I
- Location: Del Mar Racetrack; Del Mar, California, United States
- Inaugurated: 1951
- Race type: Thoroughbred – Flat racing
- Website: www.dmtc.com

Race information
- Distance: 7 furlongs
- Surface: dirt
- Track: left-handed
- Qualification: Two-year-old fillies
- Weight: Scale
- Purse: $300,000 (since 2012)

The Del Mar Debutante Stakes is an American thoroughbred horse race for two-year-old fillies run each year in early September at Del Mar Racetrack in Del Mar, California. A Grade I event since 1999, the Debutante is raced on dirt at a distance of seven furlongs and currently offers a purse of $300,000.

Inaugurated in 1951 at a distance of six furlongs, in 1974 the race was changed to a one-mile event then in 1993 to its current seven furlongs. From 2007 to 2014, it was run on a Polytrack all weather surface.

The Del Mar Debutante Stakes was raced in two divisions in 1984.

== Records ==
Speed record:

- 1:21.40 – Call Now (1994) (at current distance of 7 furlongs)

Most wins by a jockey:

- 5 – Gary Stevens (1987, 1988, 1992, 2002, 2013)
- 5 – Bill Shoemaker (1953, 1954, 1972, 1974, 1979)

Most wins by a trainer:

- 13 – Bob Baffert (1995, 1997, 1998, 1999, 2001, 2006, 2012, 2019, 2020, 2021, 2024, 2025, 2026)

Most wins by an owner:

- 3 – Ellwood B. & Elizabeth E. Johnston (1959, 1970, 1971)

== Winners since 1979 ==
Year	Winner	Jockey	Trainer	Owner	Time
2026	Miss Monica	Juan J. Hernandez	Bob Baffert	Michael E. Pegram, Karl Watson and Paul Weitman	1:23.54
2025	Bottle of Rouge	Mike E.Smith	Bob Baffert	Natalie J. Baffert	1:23.05
2024	Temna	Kazushi Kimura	Bob Baffert	Baoma Corp.	1:23.67
2023	Tamara	Mike E. Smith	Richard Mandella	Spendthrift Farm	1:22.41
2022	And Tell Me Nolies	Ramon Vazquez	Peter Miller	Peter Redekop	1:23.29
2021	Grace Adler	Flavien Prat	Bob Baffert	Willow Grace Farm and Michael Lund Peterson	1:23.76
2020	Princess Noor	Victor Espinoza	Bob Baffert	Zedan Racing Stables	1:23.15
2019	Bast	Drayden Van Dyke	Bob Baffert	Baoma Corporation	1:23.73
2018	Bellafina	Flavien Prat	Simon Callaghan	Kaleem Shah, Inc.	1:25.51
2017	Moonshine Memories	Flavien Prat	Simon Callaghan	Bridlewood Farm, Magnier, et al.	1:23.61
2016	Union Strike	Martin Garcia	Shelbe Ruis	Ruis Racing	1:23.22
2015	Songbird	Mike E. Smith	Jerry Hollendorfer	Fox Hill Farms	1:22.65
2014	Sunset Glow	Victor Espinoza	Wesley A. Ward	Ten Broeck Farm	1:23.12
2013	She's a Tiger	Gary Stevens	Jeffrey L. Bonde	Dedomenico/Aldrich et al.	1:22.71
2012	Executiveprivilege	Rafael Bejarano	Bob Baffert	Watson/Pegram/Weitman	1:23.43
2011	Weemissfrankie	Rafael Bejarano	Peter Eurton	Alesia/Bran Jam Stable/Ciaglia Stable/Dyrdek/Cosato	1:23.20
2010	Tell a Kelly	Alonso Quinonez	John W. Sadler	Ike & Dawn Thrash	1:23.05
2009	Mi Sueno	Michael Baze	Eric Guillot	Southern Equine Stable	1:23.78
2008	Stardom Bound	Mike E. Smith	Christopher Paasch	Charles R. Cono	1:22.50
2007	Set Play	Brice Blanc	Peter Miller	Gerson Racing	1:26.79
2006	Point Ashley	Victor Espinoza	Bob Baffert	Zayat Stables	1:23.34
2005	Wild Fit	Alex Solis	Jeff Mullins	Brewer Stable & Smith	1:23.20
2004	Sweet Catomine	Victor Espinoza	Julio C. Canani	Pam & Martin Wygod	1:24.18
2003	Halfbridled	Julie Krone	Richard Mandella	Wertheimer et Frère	1:22.20
2002	Miss Houdini	Gary Stevens	Warren Stute	Bo Hirsch	1:23.43
2001	Habibti	Victor Espinoza	Bob Baffert	The Thoroughbred Corp.	1:22.22
2000	Cindy's Hero	Garrett Gomez	David Hofmans	Tom & Elizabeth Baxter	1:22.61
1999	Chilukki	David Flores	Bob Baffert	Stonerside Stable	1:23.40
1998	Excellent Meeting	Kent Desormeaux	Bob Baffert	Golden Eagle Farm	1:22.20
1997	Vivid Angel	Kent Desormeaux	Bob Baffert	Ed & Natalie Friendly	1:24.20
1996	Sharp Cat	René Douglas	D. Wayne Lukas	The Thoroughbred Corp.	1:23.80
1995	Batroyale	Martin Pedroza	Bob Baffert	Robert & Barbara Walter	1:22.40
1994	Call Now	Alex Solis	Ron McAnally	VHW Stables	1:21.40
1993	Sardula	Ed Delahoussaye	Brian A. Mayberry	Ann & Jerry Moss	1:21.60
1992	Beal Street Blues	Gary Stevens	Frank L. Brothers	Lazy Lane Farms, Inc.	1:37.00
1991	La Spia	Alex Solis	Randy Winick	Albert R. Broccoli	1:37.00
1990	Beyond Perfection	Alex Solis	Jack Van Berg	John A. Franks	1:34.80
1989	Rue de Palm	Russell Baze	D. Wayne Lukas	Peter M. Brant	1:35.00
1988	Lea Lucinda *	Gary Stevens	D. Wayne Lukas	Calumet Farm	1:36.40
1987	Lost Kitty	Gary Stevens	D. Wayne Lukas	Klein & Lukas	1:36.00
1986	Brave Raj	Corey Black	Melvin F. Stute	Dolly Green	1:35.80
1985	Arewehavingfunyet	Patrick Valenzuela	D. Wayne Lukas	Spendthrift Farm	1:36.00
1984	Fiesta Lady	Laffit Pincay Jr.	D. Wayne Lukas	M/M E. V. Klein	1:38.80
1984	Full O Wisdom	Chris McCarron	Joseph Manzi	Four Star Stables/Murray Ozer	1:37.40
1983	Althea	Laffit Pincay Jr.	D. Wayne Lukas	Aykroyd, Alexander & Groves	1:36.00
1982	Landaluce	Laffit Pincay Jr.	D. Wayne Lukas	Beal & French	1:35.60
1981	Skillful Joy	Chris McCarron	Ross Fenstermaker	Fred W. Hooper	1:37.40
1980	Raja's Delight	Chris McCarron	Tommy Doyle	Jack L. Finley	1:37.40
1979	Table Hands	Bill Shoemaker	Willard Proctor	Allen & Brant	1:35.00
1978	Terlingua	Darrel McHargue	D. Wayne Lukas	Beal & French	1:36.20
1977	Extravagant	Marco Castaneda	J. Jimenez	Deeb & Austad	1:36.40
1976	Telferner	Laffit Pincay Jr.	Tommy Doyle	J. C. Pollard	1:37.20
1975	Queen to Be	Darrel McHargue	Ron McAnally	Elmendorf	1:36.80
1974	Bubblewin	Bill Shoemaker	Lou Glauburg	Morris Shapiro	1:36.80
1973	Fleet Peach	Donald Pierce	Tommy Doyle	Canadiana Farms	1:09.60
1972	Windy's Daughter	Bill Shoemaker	Tommy Doyle	Bernice Blackman	1:09.60
1971	Impressive Style	Donald Pierce	Federico A. Miquelez	Ellwood B. & Elizabeth E. Johnston	1:09.20
1970	Generous Portion	D. Tierne	Federico A. Miquelez	Ellwood B. & Elizabeth E. Johnston	1:09.60
1969	Atomic Wings	Donald Pierce	James Nazworthy	Sledge Stable	1:08.60
1968	Fourth Round	Jerry Lambert	Tommy Doyle	Buena Suerte Stable	1:10.40
1967	Fast Dish	Jerry Lambert	Buster Millerick	M/M Louis K. Shapiro	1:09.80
1966	Native Honey	Rudy Campas	Tommy Doyle	M/M Peter Dye	1:10.00
1965	Century	Bill Hartack	Gordon C. Campbell	M/M John J. Elmore	1:10.00
1964	Admirably	Raymond York	Lou Glauburg	E. J. Anderson	1:09.80
1963	Leisurely Kin	Jerry Lambert	George Adams	J. Kel Houssels	1:09.20
1962	Brown Berry	Pete Moreno	Robert L. Wheeler	C. V. Whitney	1:09.40
1961	Spark Plug	Robert Yanez	Robert L. Wheeler	C. V. Whitney	1:09.40
1960	Amri-an	Alex Maese	Joseph S. Dunn	Howard B. Keck	1:09.40
1959	Darling June	Donald Pierce	Tommy Doyle	Ellwood B. & Elizabeth E. Johnston	1:09.20
1958	Khalita	Raymond York	Malcolm Anderson	William N. Modglin	1:10.60
1957	Sally Lee	Pete Moreno	Charles Dickens	Covert Ranch (George Covert)	1:10.40
1956	Blue Vic	Rogelio Trejos	Reggie Cornell	John J. Elmore	1:09.80
1955	Miss Todd	Raymond York	Robert L. Wheeler	J. Rubin Jelks	1:10.40
1954	Fair Molly	Bill Shoemaker	Benny Slasky	Dr. & Mrs. J. R. Smith	1:10.60
1953	Lady Cover Up *	Bill Shoemaker	Bob R. Roberts	Black Gold Stable	1:11.00
1952	Lap Full	Henry Moreno	Horace A. Jones	Calumet Farm	1:10.60
1951	Tonga	Gordon Glisson	Warren Stute	Yolo Stable	1:12.00

- In 1988, Approved to Fly finished first but was disqualified to second.
- In 1953, Frosty Dawn won the race but later was found to be ineligible and the race was awarded to Lady Cover Up.
