= Meadow Star =

American-bred Thoroughbred racehorse

- Sire: Meadowlake
- Grandsire: Hold Your Peace
- Dam: Inreality Star
- Damsire: In Reality
- Sex: Filly
- Foaled: May 19, 1988
- Country: United States
- Colour: Chestnut
- Breeder: Jaime S. Carrion
- Owner: Carl Icahn
- Trainer: LeRoy Jolley
- Record: 20: 11-1-2
- Earnings: $1,445,740

Major wins
- Schuylerville Stakes (1990); Astoria Stakes (1990); Matron Stakes (1990); Spinaway Stakes (1990); Frizette Stakes (1990); Acorn Stakes (1991); Mother Goose Stakes (1991); Breeders' Cup wins: Breeders' Cup Juvenile Fillies (1990)

Awards
- American Champion Two-Year-Old Filly (1990)

Honours
- Meadow Star Stakes at Belmont Park
- Last updated on October 11, 2007

Meadow Star (May 19, 1988 – April 11, 2002) was an American Thoroughbred Champion racehorse. She was described by Breeders' Cup Inc. as "one of the greatest 2-year-old fillies ever".

Foaled in Florida, Meadow Star was bred by Jaime Carrion at his The Oaks farm in Ocala. Sired by the American Grade I winner Meadowlake, and out of the mare Inreality Star, she was sold at the 1989 Keeneland yearling sale for $90,000. Her buyer, prominent Wall Street investor Carl Icahn, handed her over to trainer LeRoy Jolley for race conditioning.

== Racing career ==
=== 1990: Two-year-old season ===
Meadow Star made a successful racing debut on June 13, 1990, winning an allowance race at New York's Belmont Park. She went on to win four straight graded stakes races. In her last outing before the Breeders' Cup, she won the Frizette Stakes by fourteen lengths. Shortly thereafter, Icahn announced that he would donate all of Meadow Star's future earnings to the Children's Rescue Fund, a charity he had founded to help homeless children.

Ridden by José A. Santos, Meadow Star was the overwhelming betting favorite for the 1990 Breeders' Cup Juvenile Fillies. Bet down to 1:5 odds, she was the heaviest favorite in the history of the Breeders Cup races. Lite Light, owned by Rap music star MC Hammer, was a distant second choice at 9:1. Meadow Star did not disappoint her supporters, winning by five lengths over runner-up Private Treasure. She defeated the future Hall of Fame filly Dance Smartly, who finished third, as well as future two-time American Champion Female Turf Horse and Hall of Fame inductee Flawlessly.

Meadow Star's undefeated 1990 season made her the unanimous winner of the Eclipse Award for American Champion Two-Year-Old Filly.

=== 1991: Three-year-old season ===
As a three-year-old, Meadow Star won her first two races of 1991. Then, up against males for the first time, she finished a well-beaten fourth in the Wood Memorial Stakes. Following this loss, her handlers decided not to enter her in the Kentucky Derby. After a two-month layoff, she came back to compete in the then-current version of New York's Triple Tiara series for fillies. She began with a six-length win in the Acorn Stakes, then ran in the 1 1/8 miles (1.8 km) Mother Goose Stakes. In this race, she faced Lite Light, whom she had easily beaten in the previous fall's Breeders' Cup Juvenile Fillies but who at age three was a vastly improved filly. After the two ran head-to-head from the turn at the top of the homestretch, Meadow Star won by a "lip" in a photo finish that took the officials six minutes to adjudicate. The two fillies finished 15 1/2 lengths in front of the rest of the field. A month later, they met again in the final leg of the Triple Tiara, the 1 1/4-mile (2.0 km) Coaching Club American Oaks. Once again they pulled away from the field, going head-to-head at the top of the stretch. But this time the extra 1/8 mi (0.20 km) was too much for Meadow Star, while Lite Light put on a powerful drive and won by seven lengths in stakes record time.

After her loss in the Coaching Club American Oaks, Meadow Star was rested until early September, but in her return finished fourth in the one mile Maskette Stakes. She did not race again until April 24, 1992, and after a season that saw her go winless in five starts with two third-place finishes her best showings, she was retired to broodmare service at Trackside Farm near Versailles, Kentucky.

== Retirement ==
As a broodmare, Meadow Star produced three foals from Deputy Minister and one each from Gulch, Danzig and A.P. Indy. Through her stakes-placed daughter Grechelle, Meadow Star is the third dam of champion Arrogate.

On April 11, 2002, she suffered complications giving birth to a foal by Fusaichi Pegasus and died at the Hagyard Equine Medical Institute equine hospital. She is buried at Trackside Farm.

== Pedigree ==
Pedigree of Meadow Star, chestnut mare, 1988
Sire Meadowlake chestnut 1983	Hold Your Peace b. 1969	Speak John b. 1958	Prince John
Sire Meadowlake chestnut 1983	Hold Your Peace b. 1969	Speak John b. 1958	Nuit de Folies
Sire Meadowlake chestnut 1983	Hold Your Peace b. 1969	Blue Moon b. 1948	Eight Thirty
Sire Meadowlake chestnut 1983	Hold Your Peace b. 1969	Blue Moon b. 1948	Blue Grail
Sire Meadowlake chestnut 1983	Suspicious Native ch. 1972	Raise a Native ch. 1961	Native Dancer
Sire Meadowlake chestnut 1983	Suspicious Native ch. 1972	Raise a Native ch. 1961	Raise You
Sire Meadowlake chestnut 1983	Suspicious Native ch. 1972	Be Suspicious b. 1963	Porterhouse
Sire Meadowlake chestnut 1983	Suspicious Native ch. 1972	Be Suspicious b. 1963	Nothirdchance
Dam Inreality Star bay 1979	In Reality b. 1964	Intentionally blk. 1956	Intent
Dam Inreality Star bay 1979	In Reality b. 1964	Intentionally blk. 1956	My Recipe
Dam Inreality Star bay 1979	In Reality b. 1964	My Dear Girl ch. 1957	Rough'n Tumble
Dam Inreality Star bay 1979	In Reality b. 1964	My Dear Girl ch. 1957	Iltis
Dam Inreality Star bay 1979	Imanative gr. 1964	Native Dancer gr. 1950	Polynesian
Dam Inreality Star bay 1979	Imanative gr. 1964	Native Dancer gr. 1950	Geisha
Dam Inreality Star bay 1979	Imanative gr. 1964	Flolou b. 1959	My Babu
Dam Inreality Star bay 1979	Imanative gr. 1964	Flolou b. 1959	Fleece (Family 16-g)

Meadow Star is inbred 4x3 to Native Dancer, meaning Native Dancer appears once in the fourth generation and once in the third generation of her pedigree.
