= Dolly Green =

American philanthropist and thoroughbred owner

Dorothy Wellburn Green
- Born: September 19, 1906; Los Angeles, California, U.S.
- Died: September 4, 1990 (aged 83); Los Angeles, California, U.S.
- Resting place: Holy Cross Cemetery
- Education: Marlborough School
- Occupations: Philanthropist, Thoroughbred owner/breeder
- Parents: Burton E. Green (father); Lillian (Wellburn) Green (mother)
- Relatives: Olin Wellborn (maternal grandfather)

Dolly Green (September 19, 1906 – September 4, 1990) was an American heiress, philanthropist and thoroughbred owner.

== Early life ==
Dorothy Wellborn Green was born on September 19, 1906, to Burton E. Green (1868–1965), oilman and co-founder of Beverly Hills, California, and Lillian Wellborn. Her maternal grandfather was Judge Olin Wellborn (1848–1921). In 1979, she inherited part of the $3.6-billion sale of her father's Belridge Oil Company to Shell Oil Co. She graduated from the Marlborough School. She later served on the board of trustees of the Burton E. Green Foundation.

== Thoroughbreds and philanthropy ==
Green spent US$2.2 million for five yearlings at a horse sale at the Keeneland in Lexington, Kentucky, in 1980. Later, she owned seventy-four thoroughbreds. In 1984, she established the Dolly Green Equine Research Lab of the Southern California Equine Foundation at the Hollywood Park Racetrack in Inglewood, California. In 1986 at Santa Anita Park in Arcadia, California, her horse Brave Raj won the US$1 million Breeders' Cup Juvenile Fillies and would later be voted the Eclipse Award for American Champion Two-Year-Old Filly. The Dolly Green Research Foundation, affiliated with the Southern California Equine Foundation, ranks as the second-largest private foundation dedicated to research on equine health issues. She socialized with Leslie Combs II, owner of Spendthrift Farm in Lexington, Kentucky.

Green started the Dolly Green Scholars Award at UCLA's Jules Stein Eye Institute. She was a former member of the Los Angeles Junior League and the advisory board of the Los Angeles Orphanage Guild.

== Personal life ==
Green resided in Bel Air, Los Angeles. She was a billionaire, and one of the richest people in California. She died on September 4, 1990, and was buried in Holy Cross Cemetery in Culver City, California.
