= Laffit Pincay Jr. =

Panamanian jockey (1946-)

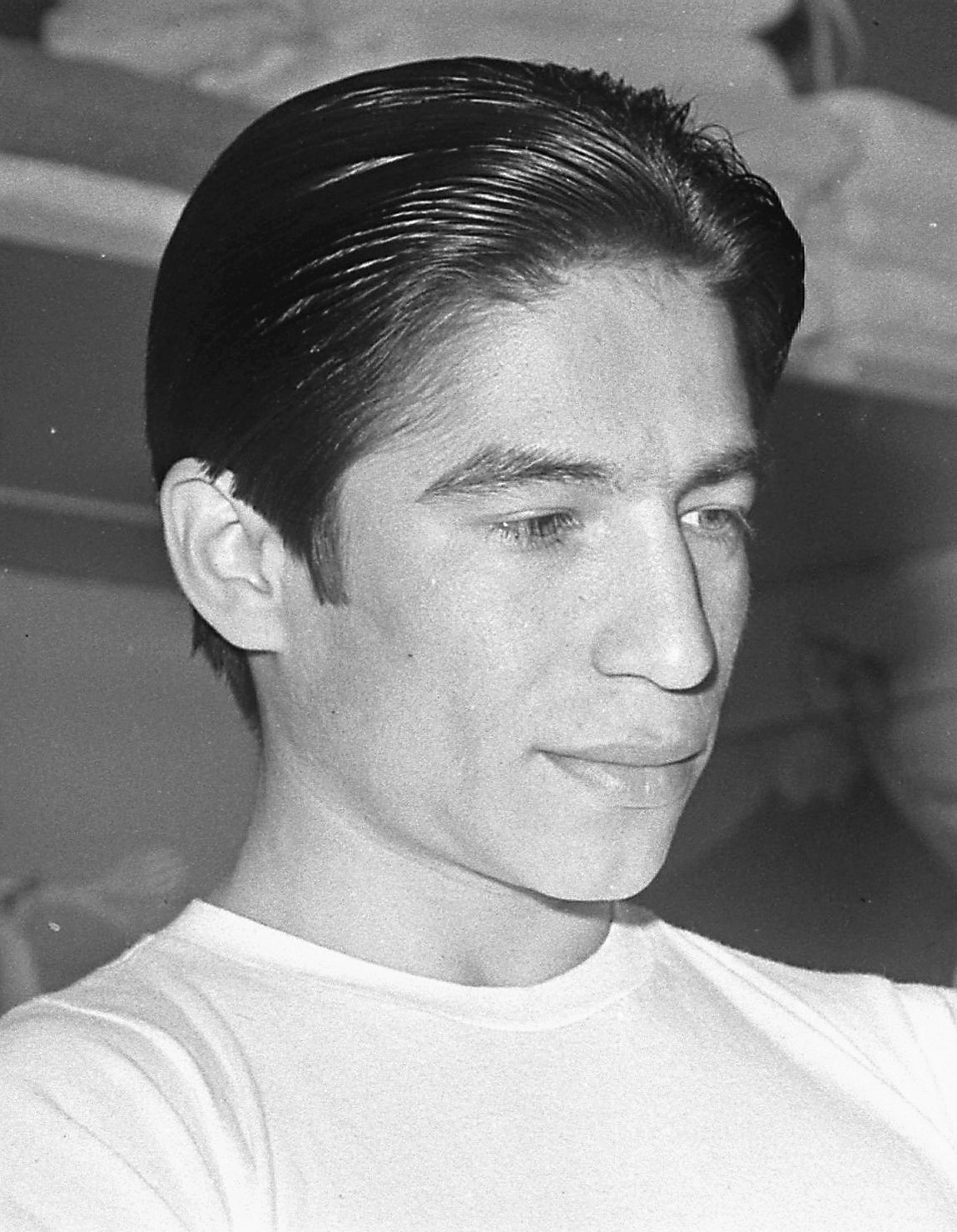
- Pincay Jr. in 1972

Personal information
- Born: December 29, 1946 (age 79) Panama City, Panama
- Occupation: Jockey

Horse racing career
- Sport: Horse racing
- Career wins: 9,530

Major racing wins
- San Bernardino Handicap (1967, 1968, 1971, 1974, 1979, 1985, 1989) Santa Anita Derby (1968, 1972, 1973, 1976, 1978, 1982, 1985); Los Angeles Handicap (1968, 1974, 1975, 1980, 1989, 1997); Santa Barbara Handicap (1968, 1971, 1973, 1974, 1978, 1980, 1982, 1993); Hollywood Gold Cup (1970, 1975, 1977, 1979, 1982, 1985-1986, 2001-2002); Blue Grass Stakes (1974, 2001); Florida Derby (1974, 1984); Hawthorne Handicap (1974, 1978, 1979, 1980, 1985, 1986, 1989, 1990); Whitney Handicap (1974); Bing Crosby Handicap (1976, 1977, 1983); Del Mar Debutante Stakes (1976, 1982, 1983, 1984); Del Mar Futurity (1976, 1983, 1985, 1987); Rancho Bernardo Handicap (1976, 1977, 1980, 1982, 1984, 1988, 1989, 1991, 2000); San Diego Handicap (1976, 1986, 1987, 1992); Sorrento Stakes (1976, 1980, 1987, 1989, 1993, 2000); Eddie Read Handicap (1978, 1984, 1987, 1991); Del Mar Derby (1979, 1980, 1982, 1990, 1994); Jockey Club Gold Cup (1979, 1987); John C. Mabee Handicap (1979); Woodward Stakes (1979); Kentucky Oaks (1981); Del Mar Oaks (1983); Canadian International Stakes(1984); Longacres Mile (1984, 1986); Princess Stakes (1986); Washington, D.C. International (1987, 1990); Clement L. Hirsch Handicap (1990, 1992) Del Mar Handicap (1995, 2001) U.S. Triple Crown wins: Belmont Stakes (1982, 1983, 1984); Kentucky Derby (1984) Breeders' Cup wins: Breeders' Cup Juvenile (1985, 1986, 1988); Breeders' Cup Classic (1986); Breeders' Cup Distaff (1989, 1990); Breeders' Cup Juvenile Fillies (1993)

Racing awards
- United States Champion Jockey by earnings (1970-1974, 1979, 1985); United States Champion Jockey by wins (1971); George Woolf Memorial Jockey Award (1970); Eclipse Award for Outstanding Jockey (1971, 1973, 1974, 1979, 1985); Eclipse Special Award (1999); Big Sport of Turfdom Award (2000)

Honors
- National Museum of Racing and Hall of Fame (1975); Laffit Pincay Jr. Stakes; Lifesize bust at Santa Anita Park; Hollywood Park annual Laffit Pincay Jr. Award; Pincay Drive (formerly 90th Street) at Prairie Avenue, Inglewood, California (renamed Dec. 2003)

Significant horses
- Affirmed, Sham, Is It True, John Henry, Gamely, Desert Vixen, Susan's Girl, Genuine Risk, Bayakoa, Phone Chatter, Caveat, Conquistador Cielo, Perrault, It's in the Air, Swale, Chinook Pass, Cougar II, Autobiography, Capote, Skywalker, Landaluce, Bold Reason
- Updated on February 9, 2007

Laffit Alejandro Pincay Jr. (born December 29, 1946) is a retired Panamanian jockey who is known for once holding the all-time record for wins in horse racing, while still holding third place many years after his retirement. He competed primarily in the United States.

== Career ==
Pincay learned to ride by watching his father who was a jockey at many tracks in Panama and Venezuela. He began his riding career in his native Panama and in 1966 prominent horseman Fred W. Hooper and agent Camilo Marin sponsored him to come to the United States and ride under contract. He started his American career at Arlington Park in Chicago and won eight of his first eleven races. Pincay rose to national prominence almost immediately, winning riding titles and major stakes on both coasts. In 1968, he became only the second rider in Hollywood Park history to win six races on a single card. During his career, Pincay was voted the prestigious George Woolf Memorial Jockey Award in 1970 that honors a rider whose career and personal conduct exemplifies the very best example of participants in the sport of thoroughbred racing. In 1996, he was voted the Mike Venezia Memorial Award for "extraordinary sportsmanship and citizenship". He has won the Eclipse Award for Outstanding Jockey on five occasions and was the United States' leading jockey seven times.

In 1973, Pincay rode Sham, and together they won that year's Santa Anita Derby and placed second in the Wood Memorial behind Angle Light but ahead of their main rival, Secretariat. Sham was considered the best horse in the west, and they were second choice in the Kentucky Derby, once again behind Secretariat. Secretariat won the race, but Sham finished second, just 2/5 of a second behind. In the Preakness Stakes at Pimlico, Sham was in striking distance in the stretch before losing to Secretariat by two lengths. In the Belmont, Pincay was instructed to keep Sham close to Secretariat. They traveled down the backstretch together, but Sham was injured and fell back to finish last of five while Secretariat pulled away from the field for a 31-length victory.

== Personal life ==
Pincay married his first wife, Linda, in 1967. He and Linda had a daughter, Lisa, and a son, Laffit III. Lisa is the mother of his two grandchildren, Madelyn and Mason. Linda Pincay committed suicide in January 1985. In the 1980s he was involved with actress Phyllis Davis. He has a son, Jean Laffit Pincay, with his second wife, Jeanine. Laffit Pincay III is a horse-racing commentator for HRTV and NBC. In October 2007, he was loaned to ESPN to serve as the winner's circle interviewer at the 2007 Breeders' Cup at Monmouth Park. He resides in Arcadia, CA.

== Awards and records ==
In 2004, Hollywood Park Racetrack announced the creation of the Laffit Pincay Jr. Award to be presented annually on Hollywood Gold Cup Day that features the race he won a record nine times. The award was designed by American sculptor Nina Kaiser and is presented to someone who has served the horse racing industry with integrity, dedication, determination and distinction.

At the time of his retirement (in April 2003), he remained horse racing's winningest jockey, with 9,530 career victories. On December 1, 2006, Russell Baze passed Pincay on the all-time win list, and in February 2018, Brazilian jockey Jorge Ricardo surpassed Baze with career victory 12,843, at Gavea, in Rio de Janeiro, Brazil.

With his 8,834th win, on December 10, 1999, at Hollywood Park Racetrack in California aboard Irish Nip, he broke the career victory record previously held by Bill Shoemaker.

He won the Kentucky Derby and Belmont Stakes in 1984 aboard Swale. Pincay's win with Swale was his third consecutive Belmont victory, having ridden Conquistador Cielo and Caveat to victory in the previous two years. The four victories in the Triple Crown were the only times Pincay visited the winner's circle in those races but he never won the Preakness Stakes and failed to win another Triple Crown race after he rode Swale.

Pincay was inducted into the National Museum of Racing and Hall of Fame in 1975. In 2024, Santa Anita renamed the San Antonio Stakes in Pincay's honor.

=== Year-end charts ===
Chart (2000–2002)	Peak position
National Earnings List for Jockeys 2000	13
National Earnings List for Jockeys 2001	12
National Earnings List for Jockeys 2002	13

Preceded by Bill Shoemaker	Most Victories in Horseracing; 9,530 Wins	Succeeded by Russell Baze
