= American Champion Two-Year-Old Filly =

Award for American racehorses

The American Champion Two-Year-Old Filly is an American Thoroughbred horse racing honor awarded annually to a female horse in Thoroughbred flat racing. It became part of the Eclipse Awards program in 1971.

The award originated in 1936 when both the Daily Racing Form (DRF) and Turf and Sports Digest (TSD) magazine began naming an annual champion. Starting in 1950, the Thoroughbred Racing Associations (TRA) began naming its own champion. The following list provides the name of the horses chosen by both of these organizations. There were several disagreements, with more than one champion being recognized on seven occasions.

The Daily Racing Form, the Thoroughbred Racing Associations, and the National Turf Writers Association all joined forces in 1971 to create the Eclipse Award. In 1978, the voting resulted in a tie between two fillies.

Champions from 1887 through 1935 were selected retrospectively by a panel of experts as published by The Blood-Horse magazine.

== Honorees ==
=== Eclipse Awards ===
Year	Horse	Trainer	Owner
2025	Super Corredora	John W. Sadler	Spartan Equine Racing LLC, West Point Thoroughbreds, Gardiner, Robert C. and Olszewski, Michael W.
2024	Immersive	Brad H. Cox	Godolphin
2023	Just F Y I	William I. Mott	George Krikorian
2022	Wonder Wheel	Mark E. Casse	D. J. Stable
2021	Echo Zulu	Steve Asmussen	L and N Racing & Winchell Thoroughbreds
2020	Vequist	Robert E. Reid Jr.	Gary Barber, Wachtel Stable, Swilcan Stable
2019	British Idiom	Brad H. Cox	Madaket Stables LLC, Michael Dubb, The Elkstone Group LLC
2018	Jaywalk	John Servis	D. J. Stable & Cash is King
2017	Caledonia Road	Ralph Nicks	Zoom and Fish Stable, Charlie Spiring, Newtown Anner Stud
2016	Champagne Room	Peter Eurton	Ciaglia, Exline-Border, et al.
2015	Songbird	Jerry Hollendorfer	Fox Hill Farm, Inc.
2014	Take Charge Brandi	D. Wayne Lukas	Willis Horton
2013	She's a Tiger	Jeffrey L. Bonde	Mark Dedomenico, Allen J. Aldrich et al.
2012	Beholder	Richard E. Mandella	Spendthrift Farm
2011	My Miss Aurelia	Steve Asmussen	Stonestreet Stables
2010	Awesome Feather	Stanley I. Gold	Jacks or Better Farms, Inc.
2009	She Be Wild	Wayne M. Catalano	Nancy Mazzoni
2008	Stardom Bound	Christopher Paasch	IEAH Stables & Charles Cono
2007	Indian Blessing	Bob Baffert	Patti & Hal J. Earnhardt III
2006	Dreaming of Anna	Wayne M. Catalano	Frank C. Calabrese
2005	Folklore	D. Wayne Lukas	Bob & Beverly Lewis
2004	Sweet Catomine	Julio C. Canani	Pam & Martin Wygod
2003	Halfbridled	Richard E. Mandella	Wertheimer et Frère
2002	Storm Flag Flying	Claude R. McGaughey III	Ogden Mills Phipps
2001	Tempera	Eoin G. Harty	Godolphin Racing
2000	Caressing	David R. Vance	Carl F. Pollard
1999	Chilukki	Bob Baffert	Stonerside Stable
1998	Silverbulletday	Bob Baffert	Michael E. Pegram
1997	Countess Diana	Patrick B. Byrne	M/M D. Propson, M/M R. Kaster, et al.
1996	Storm Song	Nick Zito	Dogwood Stable
1995	Golden Attraction	D. Wayne Lukas	William T. Young
1994	Flanders	D. Wayne Lukas	Overbrook Farm
1993	Phone Chatter	Richard E. Mandella	Herman Sarkowsky
1992	Eliza	Alex L. Hassinger Jr.	Allen E. Paulson
1991	Pleasant Stage	Chris Speckert	Buckland Farm
1990	Meadow Star	LeRoy Jolley	Carl Icahn
1989	Go for Wand	William Badgett Jr.	Christiana Stable
1988	Open Mind	D. Wayne Lukas	Eugene V. Klein
1987	Epitome	Philip M. Hauswald	John A. Bell III
1986	Brave Raj	Melvin F. Stute	Dolly Green
1985	Family Style	D. Wayne Lukas	Eugene V. Klein
1984	Outstandingly	Pancho Martin	Harbor View Farm
1983	Althea	D. Wayne Lukas	Aykroyd, Alexander, & Groves
1982	Landaluce	D. Wayne Lukas	Barry A. Beal & Lloyd R. French Jr.
1981	Before Dawn	John M. Veitch	Lucille P. Markey
1980	Heavenly Cause	Woody Stephens	Ryehill Farm
1979	Smart Angle	Woody Stephens	Ryehill Farm
1978	Candy Éclair (tie)	S. Allen King	Adele W. Paxson
1978	It's In The Air (tie)	Laz Barrera	Harbor View Farm
1977	Lakeville Miss	Jose A. Martin	Randolph Weinsier
1976	Sensational	Woody Stephens	Mill House Stable
1975	Dearly Precious	Stephen A. DiMauro	Richard E. Bailey
1974	Ruffian	Frank Y. Whiteley Jr.	Stuart S. Janney Jr. & Barbara Phipps Janney
1973	Talking Picture	John P. Campo	Maxwell H. Gluck
1972	La Prevoyante	Yonnie Starr	Jean-Louis Lévesque
1971	Numbered Account	Roger Laurin	Ogden Phipps

=== Daily Racing Form, Turf & Sport Digest and Thoroughbred Racing Association Awards ===
Year	Horse	Trainer	Owner
1970	Forward Gal	Warren A. Croll Jr.	Aisco Stable
1969	Fast Attack (DRF)	Harry M. Wells	Hal-Bar Ranch (Mr. Hickey, Paul Robinson, William M. Ayers)
1969	Tudor Queen (TRA)	Gil Rowntree	Stafford Farms
1968	Gallant Bloom (DRF)	Max Hirsch	Robert J. Kelberg Jr.
1968	Process Shot (TRA) (TSD)	John B. Bond	M/M Sonny Werblin
1967	Queen of the Stage	Edward A. Neloy	Ogden Phipps
1966	Regal Gleam	Hirsch Jacobs	Patrice Jacobs
1965	Moccasin	Harry Trotsek	Claiborne Farm
1964	Queen Empress	William C. Winfrey	Wheatley Stable
1963	Tosmah (DRF) (TSD)	Joe Mergler	Anthony Imbesi
1963	Castle Forbes (TRA)	William C. Winfrey	Wheatley Stable
1962	Smart Deb (DRF) (TRA)	Arnold N. Winick	Marion Reineman
1962	Affectionately (TSD)	Hirsch Jacobs	Ethel D. Jacobs
1961	Cicada	Casey Hayes	Meadow Stable
1960	Bowl of Flowers	J. Elliott Burch	Brookmeade Stable
1959	My Dear Girl	Melvin Calvert	Frances A. Genter
1958	Quill	Lucien Laurin	Reginald N. Webster
1957	Idun	Sherrill W. Ward	Mrs. Charles U. Bay
1956	Leallah (DRF) (TSD)	MacKenzie Miller	Charlton Clay
1956	Romanita (TRA)	Frankie Sanders	Reverie Knoll Farm (Freeman Keyes)
1955	Doubledogdare (TSD) (DRF)	Moody Jolley	Claiborne Farm
1955	Nasrina (TRA)	Edward A. Christmas	Howell E. Jackson III
1954	High Voltage	James E. Fitzsimmons	Wheatley Stable
1953	Evening Out	Bert Mulholland	George D. Widener Jr.
1952	Sweet Patootie	H. H. "Pete" Battle	Mrs. E. Dale Shaffer
1951	Rose Jet	Willie Booth	Maine Chance Farm
1950	Aunt Jinny	Duval A. Headley	Duval A. Headley

=== Daily Racing Form and Turf & Sport Digest Awards ===
Year	Horse	Trainer	Owner
1949	Bed o' Roses	William C. Winfrey	Alfred G. Vanderbilt II
1948	Myrtle Charm	James W. Smith	Maine Chance Farm
1947	Bewitch	Horace A. Jones	Calumet Farm
1946	First Flight	Sylvester Veitch	C. V. Whitney
1945	Beaugay	Tom Smith	Maine Chance Farm
1944	Busher	James W. Smith	Edward R. Bradley
1943	Durazna (DRF)	John M. Goode	Brownell Combs
1943	Twilight Tear (TSD)	Ben A. Jones	Calumet Farm
1942	Askmenow	Kenneth Osborne	Hal Price Headley
1941	Petrify	Alfred Holberg	Alfred G. Vanderbilt II
1940	Level Best	John P. (Doc) Jones	Crispin Oglebay
1939	Now What	Bud Stotler	Alfred G. Vanderbilt II
1938	Incoselda	Ben A. Jones	Woolford Farm
1937	Jacola	Selby L. Burch	Nancy Carr Friendly
1936	Apogee	Duval A. Headley	Hal Price Headley

=== The Blood-Horse retrospective champions ===
Year	Horse	Trainer	Owner
1935	Forever Yours	Robert V. McGarvey	Milky Way Farm Stable
1934	Nellie Flag	Bert B. Williams	Calumet Farm
1933	Mata Hari	Clyde Van Dusen	Dixiana Farm
1933	Bazaar	Herbert J. Thompson	Edward R. Bradley
1932	Happy Gal	James Fitzsimmons	Belair Stud
1931	Top Flight	Thomas J. Healey	C. V. Whitney
1930	Baba Kenny	Herbert J. Thompson	Edward R. Bradley
1929	Alcibiades	Walter W. Taylor	Hal Price Headley
1928	Current	Jack Baker	Robert Sterling Clark
1927	Anita Peabody	Bert S. Michell	Fannie Hertz
1926	Fair Star	Carl Utz	William du Pont Jr.
1925	Friar's Carse	Gwyn R. Tompkins	Glen Riddle Farm
1924	Mother Goose	Fred Hopkins	Harry Payne Whitney
1924	Maud Muller	Fred Hopkins	Harry Payne Whitney
1923	Fluvanna	Max Hirsch	Cary T. Grayson
1922	Sally's Alley	Eugene Wayland	Willis Sharpe Kilmer
1921	Startle	John I. Smith	Herbert H. Hewitt
1920	Careful	Eugene Wayland	Walter J. Salmon Sr.
1920	Prudery	James G. Rowe Sr.	Harry Payne Whitney
1919	Constancy	H. Guy Bedwell	J. K. L. Ross
1919	Miss Jemima	Charles E. Rowe	Charles E. Rowe
1918	Elfin Queen	William H. Karrick	Harry K. Knapp
1917	Rosie O'Grady	James G. Rowe Sr.	Harry Payne Whitney
1916	Koh-i-Noor	William H. Karrick	Schuyler L. Parsons
1915	Puss in Boots	John Murphy	Foxhall P. Keene
1914	Regret	James G. Rowe Sr.	Harry Payne Whitney
1913	Southern Maid	John Nixon	Robert T. Davies
1912	Gowell	Jack T. Weaver	Jack T. Weaver
1911	Moisant	Albert Simons	Albert Simons
1910	Bashti	Thomas Welsh	Newcastle Stable
1909	Ocean Bound	French Brooks	Woodford Clay
1908	Maskette	James G. Rowe Sr.	James R. Keene
1907	Stamina	John W. Rogers	Harry Payne Whitney
1906	Court Dress	James G. Rowe Sr.	James R. Keene
1905	Perverse	John W. Rogers	Harry Payne Whitney
1904	Artful	John W. Rogers	Herman B. Duryea
1904	Tanya	John W. Rogers	Herman B. Duryea
1903	Hamburg Belle	A. Jack Joyner	Sydney Paget †
1902	Eugenia Burch	Jim McLaughlin	Libby Curtis
1901	Blue Girl	John W. Rogers	William C. Whitney
1901	Endurance by Right	John F. Schorr	John W. Schorr
1900	none selected	n/a	
1899	none selected	n/a	
1898	none selected	n/a	
1897	L'Alouette	James G. Rowe Sr.	L. S. Thompson & W. P. Thompson
1896	Cleophus	Hardy Campbell Jr.	Michael F. Dwyer
1895	none selected	n/a	
1894	The Butterflies	John J. Hyland	David Gideon & John Daly
1893	none selected	n/a	
1892	Lady Violet	A. Jack Joyner	August Belmont Jr.
1891	Yorkville Belle	Matthew M. Allen	Frank A. Ehret
1890	Sallie McClelland	Byron McClelland	Byron McClelland
1890	La Tosca	James G. Rowe Sr.	August Belmont
1899	none selected	n/a	
1888	none selected	n/a	
1887	Los Angeles	Robert E. Campbell	E. J. "Lucky" Baldwin

- † Hamburg Belle was always the property of James B. A. Haggin but as a convenience raced under the name of her manager, Sydney Paget.
