= Brave Raj =

American-bred Thoroughbred racehorse

- Sire: Rajab
- Grandsire: Jaipur
- Dam: Bravest Yet
- Damsire: Bravo
- Sex: Mare
- Foaled: 1984
- Country: United States
- Colour: Dark Bay/Brown
- Breeder: Wallace S. Karutz
- Owner: 1) Ben Perkins, Sr. 2) Dolly Green
- Trainer: Melvin F. Stute
- Record: 9: 6-1-0
- Earnings: $933,650

Major wins
- Del Mar Debutante Stakes (1986); Sorrento Stakes (1986); My Dear Girl Stakes (1986); Susan's Girl Stakes (1986) Breeders' Cup wins: Breeders' Cup Juvenile Fillies (1986)

Awards
- American Champion Two-Year-Old Filly (1986)

Honours
- Brave Raj Stakes at Calder Race Course

Brave Raj (1984–2006) was an American Thoroughbred racehorse who raced only one year and earned 1986 American Champion Two-Year-Old Filly honors and won the Breeders' Cup Juvenile Fillies.

A descendant of Nearco through both her sire Rajab and her dam, Bravest Yet, Brave Raj was bred in Florida and purchased by trainer Ben Perkins, Sr. for $24,000 at the Ocala Breeders' Sales Company's February sale of 2-year-olds. After racing once, Brave Raj was acquired by California oil heiress Dolly Green. She entrusted her conditioning to trainer Mel Stute.

Brave Raj's 1986 earnings set a world record for fillies in her age group. A knee injury ended her racing career and she was retired to broodmare duty at Patchen Wilkes Farm in Lexington, Kentucky where she produced ten winners, including two who won stakes races. She died at Patchen Wilkes Farm on January 28, 2006, one week after losing a foal.

== Pedigree ==
Pedigree of Brave Raj
Sire Rajab 1973	Jaipur 1959	Nasrullah	Nearco
Sire Rajab 1973	Jaipur 1959	Nasrullah	Mumtaz Begum
Sire Rajab 1973	Jaipur 1959	Rare Perfume	Eight Thirty
Sire Rajab 1973	Jaipur 1959	Rare Perfume	Fragrance
Sire Rajab 1973	Classicist 1965	Princequillo	Prince Rose
Sire Rajab 1973	Classicist 1965	Princequillo	Cosquilla
Sire Rajab 1973	Classicist 1965	Classic Music	Stymie
Sire Rajab 1973	Classicist 1965	Classic Music	Jaconda
Dam Bravest Yet 1978	Bravo 1969	Bold Ruler	Nasrullah
Dam Bravest Yet 1978	Bravo 1969	Bold Ruler	Miss Disco
Dam Bravest Yet 1978	Bravo 1969	Magneto	Ambiorix
Dam Bravest Yet 1978	Bravo 1969	Magneto	Dynamo
Dam Bravest Yet 1978	Perfect Hand 1972	Hand to Hand	Warfare
Dam Bravest Yet 1978	Perfect Hand 1972	Hand to Hand	Melon
Dam Bravest Yet 1978	Perfect Hand 1972	Turn Ahead	Dead Ahead
Dam Bravest Yet 1978	Perfect Hand 1972	Turn Ahead	Millie H.
