= Phone Chatter =

American-bred Thoroughbred racehorse

- Sire: Phone Trick
- Grandsire: Clever Trick
- Dam: Passing My Way
- Damsire: Pass The Glass
- Sex: Filly
- Foaled: 1991
- Country: United States
- Colour: Chestnut
- Breeder: Herman Sarkowsky
- Owner: Herman Sarkowsky
- Record: 15: 5-3-1
- Earnings: US$838,742

Major wins
- Oak Leaf Stakes (1991); Sorrento Stakes (1993); C.E.R.F. Stakes (1994); Breeders' Cup wins: Breeders' Cup Juvenile Fillies (1993)

Awards
- American Champion Two-Year-Old Filly (1993)

Phone Chatter (1991–2007) was an American Thoroughbred Champion racehorse who won the 1993 Breeders' Cup Juvenile Fillies and who was voted American Champion Two-Year-Old Filly. She was bred and raced by Seattle, Washington businessman, Herman Sarkowsky and trained by Richard Mandella.

Phone Chatter sold for $3.6 million while in foal to Dixie Union at the November 2001 Keeneland Sales to Ireland's renowned owner of Coolmore Stud, John Magnier.
