= Jerry Hollendorfer =

American Thoroughbred racehorse trainer (born 1946)

Personal information
- Born: June 18, 1946 (age 80) Akron, Ohio, United States
- Occupation: Trainer

Horse racing career
- Sport: Horse racing
- Career wins: 7,771+ (ongoing)

Major racing wins
- Hollywood/Los Alamitos Futurity (1988, 2013); Ohio Derby (1989); Haskell Invitational Handicap (1989); Kentucky Oaks (1991, 1996, 2010); Coaching Club American Oaks (1991, 2016); El Camino Real Derby (1998, 2002, 2006, 2007, 2009, 2014); Arlington Oaks (2002); California Derby (2006, 2007, 2009); Humana Distaff Handicap (2007); Lost in the Fog Stakes (2007, 2011, 2014, 2016); Santa Anita Handicap (2008, 2015); Chandelier Stakes (2009, 2015); Hollywood Starlet Stakes (2009, 2011); Alabama Stakes (2010, 2016); Vanity/Beholder Mile Stakes (2011, 2018); Landaluce Stakes (2011); Metropolitan Handicap (2013); Santa Margarita Stakes (2014, 2016); Malibu Stakes (2014); Pacific Classic (2014); Awesome Again Stakes (2014); Bing Crosby Stakes (2015); Santa Anita Sprint Championship (2015); Del Mar Debutante (2015); Santa Anita Oaks (2016) Breeders' Cup wins: Breeders' Cup Dirt Mile (2010), (2017); Breeders' Cup Juvenile Fillies (2015)

Honours
- US Racing Hall of Fame (2011)

Significant horses
- Shared Belief, Songbird, Lite Light, Blind Luck, Cause to Believe, Hystericalady, Halo Dolly, Battle of Midway

Jerry Hollendorfer (born June 18, 1946, in Akron, Ohio) is an American Thoroughbred racehorse trainer whose notable horses include Eclipse Award winners Blind Luck, Shared Belief and Songbird. He has the most wins in the history of Northern California racehorse trainers. In 2011, he was inducted into the US Racing Hall of Fame.

== Background ==
Hollendorfer grew up on the outskirts of Akron, Ohio, in a rural area, (Bath Township), where he had a pony to ride. He attended Revere High School in Richfield then Akron University, earning a degree in business administration and marketing. He moved to California in the late 1960s, where he became interested in horse racing and decided to work on the backstretch. He started as a hot walker, then became a groom at Bay Meadows Racetrack. He worked for trainers Jerry Dutton and Jerry Fanning for a number of years, then took out his training license in 1979.

Hollendorfer currently lives in Point Richmond, California with his wife, Janet. They met in Southern California while he worked for Fanning and she was employed by another trainer, Mel Stute. The two married in the 1980s. Janet was his chief assistant and oversaw the horses stabled in Northern California while Hollendorfer traveled to other racetracks.

Hollendorfer is known for buying young horses at auction in the low to mid price range, often using his own money. He then puts together ownership groups, often retaining a percentage of the horse.

== Racing career ==
Hollendorfer struggled for the first six years of his career, saddling a total of 59 winners over the period. In 1985, the number of winners grew to 56 and then to 117 in 1986. In 1986, he also won his first stakes race with Novel Sprite, who won over $400,000 and was named the national Claimer of the Year after Hollendorfer claimed him for $16,000. Hollendorfer's earnings were over $1 million for the first time. In 1986, he won his first trainer titles at both Bay Meadows and Golden Gate Fields, starting a streak of 37 consecutive training titles at Bay Meadows and 32 titles in a row at Golden Gate. The streak was snapped in the 2008 spring meeting at Golden Gate, when he finished in a tie for second.

His first Grade I stakes winner was King Glorious, who won the Hollywood Futurity in 1988 and Haskell Invitational in 1989.

Although Hollendorfer has never won an American Triple Crown race, he achieved several victories in the equivalent races for fillies. Hollendorfer has won the Kentucky Oaks with Lite Light in 1991, Pike Place Dancer in 1996 and Blind Luck in 2011. He also won the Coaching Club American Oaks with both Lite Light and Songbird in 2016 and has won the Alabama Stakes with both Blind Luck and Songbird.

In December 2007, Hollendorfer won his 5,000th race. His 6,000th win came on September 3, 2011, at Golden Gate Fields. Win 7,000 came on November 25, 2015, when Kiss N Scat won at Golden Gate Field. Among North American trainers, only two others have crossed the 7,000 win barrier: Dale Baird and Steve Asmussen. "I've been blessed to have been in this business as long as I have," said Hollendorfer. "It's a lot of work and nobody can do it by themselves. You have to have excellent help, excellent owners and excellent horses."

He finished in the top 10 of North American trainers by number wins for 29 consecutive years (1987 thru 2015) and has ranked in the top 10 in earnings 15 times.

In 2010, Blind Luck became the first Eclipse Award winner trained by Hollendorfer after winning three Grade I races. Hollendorfer also won his first Breeders' Cup race, the Dirt Mile, with Dakota Phone.

Hollendorfer was inducted into the National Museum of Racing and Hall of Fame in 2011. ""Blind Luck was the final kick in the pants that got me in here," he said. "We took her everywhere and she never let us down for one minute. The East Coast is important and sometimes they don't know what we do out on the West Coast but there are a lot of very good horses and trainers there and a lot of competition."

In 2013, Shared Belief became Hollendorfer's second Eclipse Award winner when he was named American Champion Two-Year-Old Male after several impressive victories including the CashCall Futurity. Shared Belief became the early favorite for the 2014 Kentucky Derby but developed an abscess on his hoof and missed the race. After recovering, Shared Belief would go on to win the 2014 Pacific Classic and Awesome Again and was the favorite for the Breeders' Cup Classic. He finished fourth after a troubled trip but rebounded with wins in the Malibu, San Antonio and Santa Anita Handicaps. After being injured in his next race, Shared Belief was on the road to recovery when he suffered a severe attack of colic and died on December 3, 2015. "The whole barn loved him. We really miss him and his name comes up often," said Hollendorfer. "Sometimes there are things that happen you just can't put into words."

In 2015, Songbird was the third Eclipse Award winner to come out of the Hollendorfer stable. Songbird won three Grade 1 races as a two-year-old, including the Breeders Cup Juvenile Fillies and took home the Eclipse Award for top two-year-old filly. In 2016, Songbird won seven races, four of those races being Grade I events before losing by a nose to champion racemare Beholder in The Breeders' Cup Distaff. She was awarded her second eclipse award, winning the top three-year-old filly honor.

In June 2019, Hollendorfer was banned forever from Stronach Group facilities, owners of Santa Anita Park, following the death of four of his horses in a six-month period at the track. One of the horses that died was Battle of Midway, who had finished third in the 2017 Kentucky Derby. Hollendorfer deemed the action by the Stronach Group to be "premature". In the two years prior at Santa Anita, they had 573 horses and one breakdown.

Hollendorfer continues to manage and operate a small stable at Los Alamitos Race Course, and competes there and at Del Mar Fairgrounds.
