= Gene Klein =

American businessman (1921–1990)

- Born: January 29, 1921; The Bronx, New York, U.S.
- Died: March 12, 1990 (aged 69); Rancho Santa Fe, California, U.S.
- Occupations: Businessman, sports team owner, racehorse owner/breeder
- Known for: Seattle SuperSonics, San Diego Chargers, Lady's Secret, Winning Colors
- Political party: Democratic (1942-1972) Republican (1972-1990)
- Board member of: National General Corp., Cedars-Sinai Medical Center, University of San Diego
- Spouse: Joyce F.
- Children: 2
- Honors: Eclipse Award for Outstanding Thoroughbred Owner (1985, 1986, 1987)

Eugene Victor Klein (January 29, 1921 – March 12, 1990) was an American businessman who was chairman of the board of directors and chief stockholder of National General Corporation, an insurance and entertainment company based in Los Angeles, California. Klein was also a founding partner of the Seattle SuperSonics of the National Basketball Association (NBA), owner of the San Diego Chargers of the National Football League (NFL) from 1966 to 1984, and a major figure in Thoroughbred horse racing.

== Business career ==
Born to a Jewish family in The Bronx, New York, Klein made his money and reputation in California where he owned a very successful used-car dealership. He was an investor in National Theaters and Television, Inc., which became National General Corp. When the company ran into severe financial difficulty, Klein stepped in to save his investment. As a member of the board of directors, he became actively involved in the company's restructuring and not only restored it to profitability but turned the company into an industry powerhouse. He would end up being appointed its president and chairman.

In 1969, National General Corp acquired Great American Holding Corp., owner of the Great American Insurance Company. In 1973 they merged to become American Financial Group.

== Politics ==
A long-time Democratic Party supporter, Klein helped finance Pierre Salinger in his 1964 election campaign for the United States Senate. When Salinger lost, Klein hired him as National General's vice president in charge of advertising. In 1972, Klein left the Democratic party to support the 1972 presidential candidacy of the incumbent Republican, Richard Nixon.

== Sports franchise investments ==
On December 20, 1966, Klein and business associate Sam Schulman, plus a group of minority investors, obtained the National Basketball Association franchise for the city of Seattle, Washington. Schulman would be the active partner, serving as president of the basketball team and head of operations. Prior to this, Klein and Schulman had already made a major investment in sports following the June 1966 announcement of the merger of the American Football League and the National Football League. On August 25 they led a group of investors who purchased the San Diego Chargers for $10 million, at the time, a record price for a National Football League franchise. The majority owner, Klein served as the team's president and head of operations.

During his time with the Chargers football club, Klein became involved in a much publicized feud with Al Davis, the then managing general partner of the Oakland Raiders. Their differences resulted in a lawsuit in which a San Diego Superior Court jury held Davis responsible for a heart attack Klein suffered in 1981. The verdict was overturned on appeal.

While he was the owner of the San Diego Chargers in the mid-1970s he hired coach Don "Air" Coryell and assembled a team that kept people engaged with the Chargers because of the high scoring offense. During this time the Chargers offense had three future Hall of Fame inductees with Dan Fouts as quarterback, Kellen Winslow at tight end, and Charlie Joiner at wide receiver. Other notable receivers were All-Pros John Jefferson and later Wes Chandler. The city became highly engrossed in the franchise and pro football led all professional sports teams in the area; the baseball team and basketball team did not compete in their respective sports to nearly at the same level during this era. The Chargers won AFC West division titles in 1979–1981 and also made the playoffs in 1982. In 1980 and 1981, they reached the AFC Championship game but lost both times and never advanced to the Super Bowl under Klein.

Klein refused to renegotiate player contracts, most notably Jefferson's and defensive end Fred Dean's contracts at the beginning of the 1981 season. The situation led to both players being dealt away by the Chargers. While Jefferson was replaced by Chandler, future Hall of Famer Dean's departure on defense coincided with the Chargers surrendering the most passing yards in the NFL in both 1981 and 1982. Dean went on to win two Super Bowls with the San Francisco 49ers and was inducted into the Pro Football Hall of Fame in 2008.

In 1984, Klein sold his interest in the San Diego Chargers to Alex Spanos.

On his death, NFL commissioner Paul Tagliabue said of Klein: "He made a great contribution to the league, not only in San Diego, but on the television committee, where he was a visionary" and that Klein "was a valuable and valued owner and he will be missed."

== Thoroughbred horse racing ==
Klein entered the thoroughbred horse racing business in 1982. He established Del Rayo Racing Stables, a 237-acre (0.96 km^{2}) stables, breeding operation, and training center in Rancho Santa Fe, California. He hired D. Wayne Lukas to train his horses.

Among Klein's famous Thoroughbreds:

- Tank's Prospect - 1985, won the Preakness Stakes
- Lady's Secret - 1986, voted the Eclipse Award for Horse of the Year. Inducted into the National Museum of Racing and Hall of Fame in 1992
- Winning Colors - 1988, became only the third filly in history to win the Kentucky Derby. Voted 1988 Eclipse Award for Outstanding Three-Year-Old Filly. Inducted into the National Museum of Racing and Hall of Fame in 2000.
- Open Mind - 1988, won Breeders' Cup Juvenile Fillies, voted Eclipse Award for Outstanding Two-Year-Old Filly. 1989, voted Eclipse Award for Outstanding Three-Year-Old Filly

Klein had horses win seven Breeders' Cup races:

- Breeders' Cup Juvenile:
  - Capote (1986) (partnership)
  - Success Express (1987)
  - Is It True (1988)
- Breeders' Cup Juvenile Fillies:
  - Twilight Ridge (1985)
  - Open Mind (1988)
- Breeders' Cup Distaff:
  - Life's Magic (1985)
  - Lady's Secret (1986)

In just seven years of racing, Klein raced six champions, two of which are in the Hall of Fame, and earned a total of eleven Eclipse Awards, including being personally voted the Eclipse Award for Outstanding Owner three years running from 1985 to 1987.

Klein also started an offshoot business near his Rancho Santa Fe stables in the mid-1980s.. He developed two luxury residential real estate projects called Del Rayo Estates and Del Rayo Downs. Forbes.com ranked its 92067 as the second most expensive ZIP code real estate market in the United States for 2005

In poor health, in 1989 Klein retired from racing, selling off his 146 horses just a few months before he died. In 1995, his stables at Rancho Santa Fe, California were sold to Sidney and Jenny Craig of weight loss fame.

Klein was a benefactor to a number of charities and was a major donor to the Scripps Research Institute. He was also active in the San Diego Hall of Champions, the San Diego Museum of Art, the American Cancer Society and the Cystic Fibrosis Foundation.

== Personal life ==
He married Frances Klein, who was also Jewish; they had two children: Michael Klein and Randee Klein King.

Sporting positions
Preceded by Barron Hilton	San Diego Chargers owner (with Sam Schulman); 1966–1984	Succeeded by Alex Spanos
New creation	Seattle SuperSonics co-owner 1967–1983	Succeeded by Barry Ackerley
