= Breeders' Cup Juvenile Fillies =

American Thoroughbred horse race

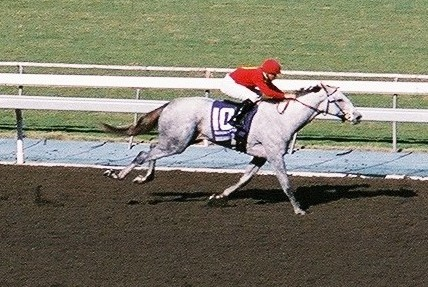
- Stardom Bound winning the 2008 Breeders' Cup Juvenile Fillies
- Class: Grade I
- Location: North America
- Inaugurated: 1984
- Race type: Thoroughbred – Flat racing

Race information
- Distance: 1 1/16 miles (8.5 furlongs)
- Surface: Dirt
- Track: left-handed
- Qualification: Two-year-old Fillies
- Weight: Assigned
- Purse: US$2,000,000

The Breeders' Cup Juvenile Fillies is a 1 1/16-mile thoroughbred horse race on dirt (although the distance has varied, depending on the configuration of the host track) for two-year-old fillies run annually since 1984 at a different racetrack in the United States or Canada as part of the Breeders' Cup World Championships in early November.

== Automatic berths ==
Beginning in 2007, the Breeders' Cup developed "The Breeders' Cup Challenge," a series of races in each division that allotted automatic qualifying bids to winners of defined races. Each of the fourteen divisions has multiple qualifying races. In the Juvenile Fillies division, runners are limited to 14, with up to three automatic berths.

The 2022 "Win and You're In" races were:

1. the Chandelier Stakes, a Grade 2 race run in October at Santa Anita Park in California
2. the Alcibiades Stakes, a Grade 1 race run in October at Keeneland in Kentucky
3. the Frizette Stakes, a Grade 1 race run in October at Aqueduct Racetrack in New York

== Records ==
Most wins by a jockey:

- 3 – Mike E. Smith (2008, 2015, 2017)
- 3 - Joel Rosario (2018, 2020, 2021)
- 2 – Pat Valenzuela (1986, 1992)
- 2 – Pat Day (1987, 1994)
- 2 – Jerry Bailey (1995, 1999)
- 2 – John Velazquez (2000, 2002)
- 2 – Corey Nakatani (2004, 2011)
- 2 – Garrett K. Gomez (2007, 2012)
- 2 – Javier Castellano (2013, 2019)

Most wins by a trainer:

- 6 – D. Wayne Lukas (1985, 1988, 1994, 1999, 2005, 2014)

Most wins by an owner:

- 2 – Eugene V. Klein (1985, 1988)
- 2 – Godolphin (2001, 2024)

== Winners ==
Year	Winner	Jockey	Trainer	Owner	Time	Purse	Grade
2026	Emphatic	Tyler Gaffalione	Brendan Walsh	Gainesway Stable	1:42.29	$2,000,000	I
2025	Super Corredora	Hector Berrios	John W. Sadler	West Point Thoroughbreds, Robert C. Gardiner, Spartan Equine Racing & Michael W. Olszewski	1:43.71	$2,000,000	I
2024	Immersive	Manuel Franco	Brad H. Cox	Godolphin	1:44.36	$2,000,000	I
2023	Just F Y I	Junior Alvarado	William I. Mott	George Krikorian	1:44.58	$2,000,000	I
2022	Wonder Wheel	Tyler Gaffalione	Mark E. Casse	D. J. Stable	1:44.90	$2,000,000	I
2021	Echo Zulu	Joel Rosario	Steve Asmussen	L and N Racing & Winchell Thoroughbreds	1:42.24	$2,000,000	I
2020	Vequist	Joel Rosario	Robert Reid Jr.	Gary Barber, Watchtel Stables, Swilcan Stables	1:42.30	$2,000,000	I
2019	British Idiom	Javier Castellano	Brad H. Cox	Michael Dubb, Elkstone Group, Madaket Stables, Bethlehem Stables	1:47.07	$2,000,000	I
2018	Jaywalk	Joel Rosario	John Servis	Cash is King LLC & DJ Stable, LLC	1:43.62	$2,000,000	I
2017	Caledonia Road	Mike E. Smith	Ralph E. Nicks	Zoom and Fish Stable, Charlie Spiring & Newtown Anner Stud	1:45.05	$2,000,000	I
2016	Champagne Room	Mario Gutierrez	Peter Eurton	Ciaglia Racing	1:45.12	$2,000,000	I
2015	Songbird	Mike E. Smith	Jerry Hollendorfer	Fox Hill Farms	1:42.73	$2,000,000	I
2014	Take Charge Brandi	Victor Espinoza	D. Wayne Lukas	Charming Syndicate	1:41.95	$2,000,000	I
2013	Ria Antonia #	Javier Castellano	Jeremiah C. Englehart	Dunn/Loooch Racing Stable	1:43.02	$2,000,000	I
2012	Beholder	Garrett K. Gomez	Richard E. Mandella	Spendthrift Farm	1:43.61	$2,000,000	I
2011	My Miss Aurelia	Corey Nakatani	Steve Asmussen	Stonestreet Stables/Bolton	1:46.00	$2,000,000	I
2010	Awesome Feather	Jeffrey Sanchez	Stanley I. Gold	Jacks or Better Farm, Inc.	1:45.17	$2,000,000	I
2009	She Be Wild	Julien Leparoux	Wayne Catalano	Nancy Mazzoni	1:43.80	$2,000,000	I
2008	Stardom Bound	Mike E. Smith	Christopher Paasch	Charles Cono LLC	1:40.99	$2,000,000	I
2007	Indian Blessing	Garrett Gomez	Bob Baffert	Hal J. Earnhardt III	1:44.73	$2,000,000	I
2006	Dreaming of Anna	René Douglas	Wayne Catalano	Frank C. Calabrese	1:43.81	$2,000,000	I
2005	Folklore	Edgar Prado	D. Wayne Lukas	Bob & Beverly Lewis	1:43.85	$2,000,000	I
2004	Sweet Catomine	Corey Nakatani	Julio Canani	Pam & Martin Wygod	1:41.65	$1,000,000	I
2003	Halfbridled	Julie Krone	Richard Mandella	Wertheimer Farm	1:42.75	$1,000,000	I
2002	Storm Flag Flying	John Velazquez	C. R. McGaughey III	Ogden Mills Phipps	1:49.60 ‡	$1,000,000	I
2001	Tempera	David Flores	Eoin G. Harty	Godolphin Racing	1:41.49	$1,000,000	I
2000	Caressing	John Velazquez	David R. Vance	Carl F. Pollard	1:42.60	$1,000,000	I
1999	Cash Run	Jerry Bailey	D. Wayne Lukas	Padua Stable	1:43.20	$1,000,000	I
1998	Silverbulletday	Gary Stevens	Bob Baffert	Michael E. Pegram	1:43.60	$1,000,000	I
1997	Countess Diana	Shane Sellers	Patrick B. Byrne	Propson, Kaster et al.	1:42.20	$1,000,000	I
1996	Storm Song	Craig Perret	Nick Zito	Dogwood Stable	1:43.60	$1,000,000	I
1995	My Flag	Jerry Bailey	C. R. McGaughey III	Ogden Phipps	1:42.40	$1,000,000	I
1994	Flanders	Pat Day	D. Wayne Lukas	Overbrook Farm	1:45.20	$1,000,000	I
1993	Phone Chatter	Laffit Pincay Jr.	Richard Mandella	Herman Sarkowsky	1:43.00	$1,000,000	I
1992	Eliza	Pat Valenzuela	Alex L. Hassinger Jr.	Allen E. Paulson	1:42.80	$1,000,000	I
1991	Pleasant Stage	Ed Delahoussaye	Chris Speckert	Buckland Farm	1:46.40	$1,000,000	I
1990	Meadow Star	José A. Santos	LeRoy Jolley	Carl Icahn	1:44.00	$1,000,000	I
1989	Go For Wand	Randy Romero	William Badgett Jr.	Christiana Stables	1:44.20	$1,000,000	I
1988	Open Mind	Ángel Cordero Jr.	D. Wayne Lukas	Eugene V. Klein	1:46.60	$1,000,000	I
1987	Epitome	Pat Day	Phil Hauswald	John A. Bell III	1:36.40 †	$1,000,000	I
1986	Brave Raj	Pat Valenzuela	Melvin F. Stute	Dolly Green	1:43.20	$1,000,000	I
1985	Twilight Ridge	Jorge Velásquez	D. Wayne Lukas	Eugene V. Klein	1:35.80 †	$1,000,000	I
1984	Outstandingly #	Walter Guerra	Pancho Martin	Harbor View Farm	1:37.80 †	$1,000,000	I

- † 1987, 1985, 1984 – raced at a distance of 1 mile
- ‡ 2002 – raced at a distance of 1 1/8 miles
- # 1984, 2013 – won via DQ

== See also ==
- Breeders' Cup Juvenile Fillies "top three finishers" and starters
- Breeders' Cup World Championships
- American thoroughbred racing top attended events
- Road to the Kentucky Oaks
