= City of Light (horse) =

American racehorse

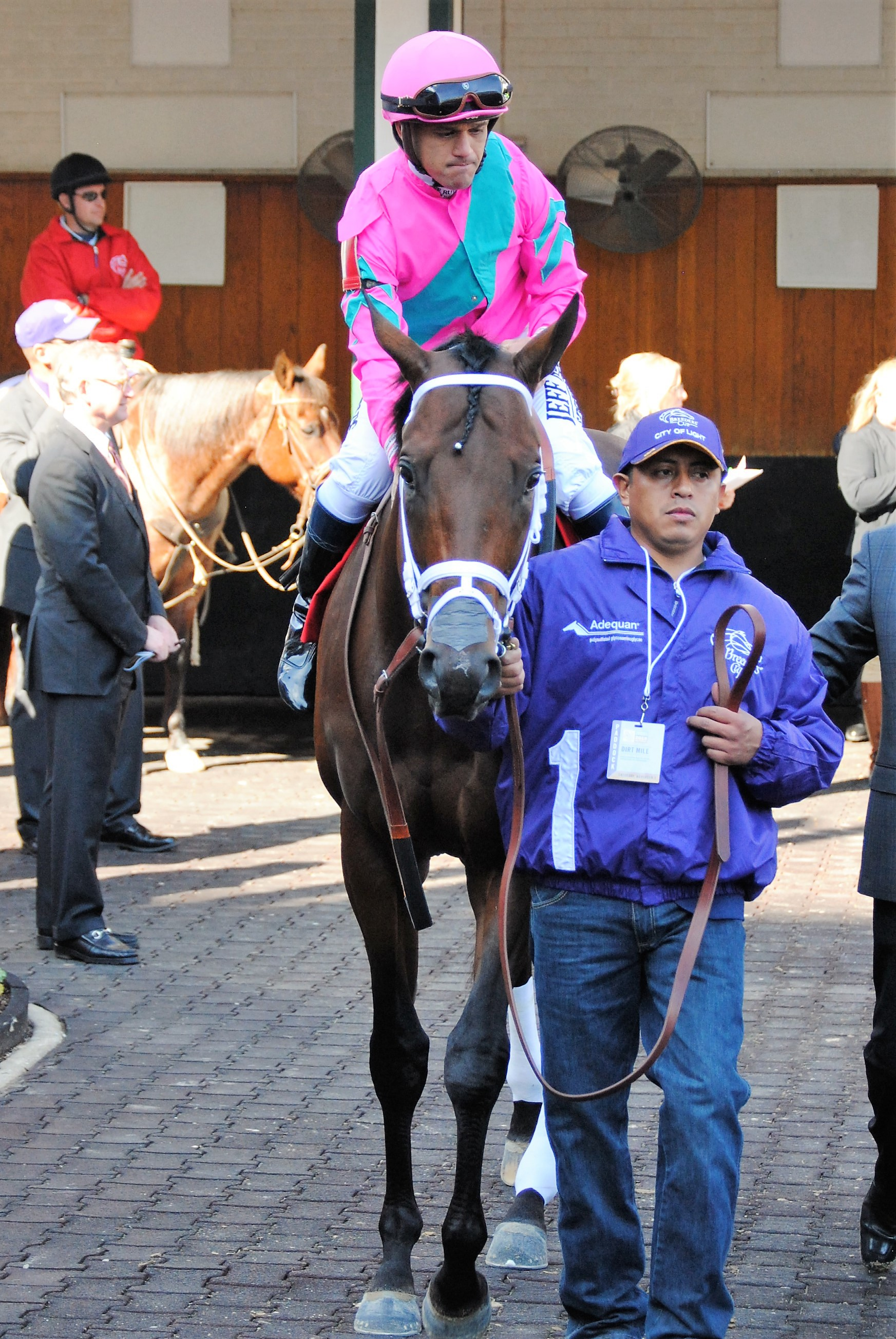
- City of Light at the 2018 Breeders' Cup
- Sire: Quality Road
- Grandsire: Elusive Quality
- Dam: Paris Notion
- Damsire: Dehere
- Sex: Stallion
- Foaled: May 7, 2014
- Country: United States
- Color: Bay
- Breeder: Ann Marie Farm
- Owner: William & Suzanne Warren
- Trainer: Michael W. McCarthy
- Record: 11: 6-4-1
- Earnings: $5,662,600

Major wins
- Malibu Stakes (2017); Triple Bend Stakes (2018); Oaklawn Handicap (2018); Pegasus World Cup (2019) Breeders' Cup wins: Breeders' Cup Dirt Mile (2018)

City of Light (foaled May 7, 2014) is an American Thoroughbred racehorse who won the 2018 Breeders' Cup Dirt Mile and 2019 Pegasus World Cup in his final two starts. He also won the 2017 Malibu Stakes and 2018 Triple Bend Stakes and Oaklawn Handicap.

== Background ==
City of Light was bred in Kentucky by Ann Marie Farm. He was sired by Quality Road, whose wins included the 2010 Metropolitan Handicap. Quality Road since had developed into one of America's leading younger sires, with offspring including champions Caledonia Road and Abel Tasman. City of Light was the final foal out of Paris Notion, an unraced daughter of Dehere.

City of Light was sold at the 2015 Keeneland Yearling Sales for $710,000 to William and Suzanne Warren, who had earlier owned Horse of the Year Saint Liam. He was trained by Michael McCarthy, who started his own stable in 2014 after working as an assistant trainer to Todd Pletcher.

== Racing career ==
=== 2017: three-year-old season ===
City of Light made his first start on July 7, 2017, in a maiden special weight race at Los Alamitos Racecourse, finishing second. Two months later, he recorded his first victory in a six-furlong maiden special weight at Del Mar, winning by 7 1/2 lengths. He then finished second in two allowance races at Santa Anita and Del Mar.

Despite having only one win from four starts, McCarthy decided to step City of Light up in class for the Grade I Malibu Stakes, held on December 26 at Santa Anita. In the seven-furlong sprint, he broke poorly from the inside post but was then urged to the lead. He held off several challenges around the far turn before drawing away to win by two lengths.

=== 2018: four-year-old season ===
City of Light made five starts at age four, with three wins, a second-place finish and a third. He was the only horse in 2018 to beat that year's champion older horse, Accelerate, when the two faced off in the Oaklawn Handicap.

On March 10, 2018, City of Light made his first start as a four-year-old in the Triple Bend Stakes, a seven-furlong sprint at Santa Anita. He stalked the early pace set by Bobby Abu Dhabi, then moved to the outside as he started his move at the head of the stretch. The two horses dueled before City of Light pulled away in the final strides to win by 1 1/2 lengths.

City of Light made his next start on April 14 at Oaklawn Park in the Oaklawn Handicap, stretching out to a distance of 1 1/8 miles. His main rival was Accelerate, who had won the Santa Anita Handicap over a distance of 1 1/4 miles on the same day that City of Light won the Triple Bend. Breaking from the outside post in a field of eleven, City of Light settled into fourth place behind the early pace set by Untrapped, just a few lengths behind Accelerate. Accelerate started his move around the far turn, followed by City of Light. The two horses hit the lead at the top of the stretch and soon distanced the rest of the field. City of Light opened a half length lead in mid stretch but Accelerate fought back. At the finish line, City of Light prevailed by a neck with Untrapped 10 lengths behind in third.

"(Jockey) Drayden (Van Dyke) was able to dictate his trip," said McCarthy. "He was loaded at the half-mile pole. At the time I was nervous, because you worry if they are going to show up after the running starts, but when they got to the quarter pole and Drayden hadn't moved his hands, I had the utmost confidence in my horse."

On May 26, City of Light stepped up to the American classic distance of 1 1/4 miles in the Gold Cup at Santa Anita. He battled with Dr. Dorr for the early lead, closing to within a head around the final turn. However, neither of these two could match the late drive by Accelerate, who won convincingly by 4 1/4 lengths over Dr. Dorr with City of Light in third.

McCarthy then chose to cut back in distance by entering City of Light in the Forego Stakes at Saratoga on August 25. Breaking poorly from the outside post position, City of Light settled in mid-pack while being carried extremely wide around the turn. He made a strong move down the stretch to finish second but never seriously challenged the winner, Whitmore.

"He broke real hard and kind of went down half a step and then gathered himself up," said McCarthy. "I think had we drawn inside, it might have been a lot different... He cut the corner and put in a run, but the other horse had already gotten away from him. He put in a super effort. I can't be upset with that."

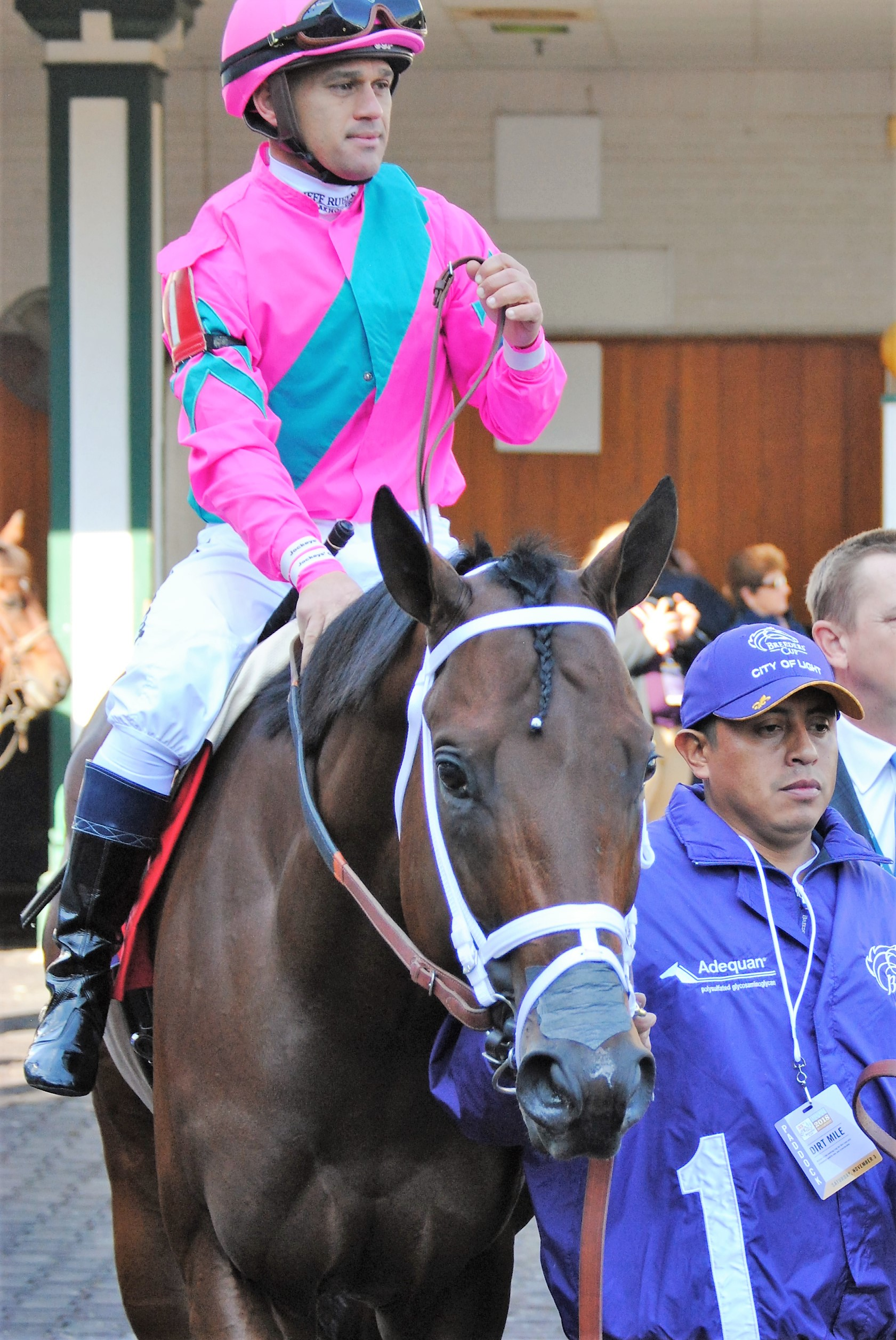
City of Light with jockey Javier Castellano at the 2018 Breeders' Cup

City of Light then trained up to the Breeders' Cup Dirt Mile held on November 3 at Churchill Downs. Because Churchill Downs has an extended chute on the backstretch, the horses would only need to go around one turn, turning the race into an extended sprint. City of Light was the second choice behind the undefeated Catalina Cruiser. Other highly regarded entries included Seeking the Soul (Ack Ack Stakes), Bravazo (second in Preakness Stakes) and Firenze Fire (Dwyer Stakes). Having drawn post position one, City of Light was urged to the early lead in order to avoid getting trapped on the rail. He set a fast opening of 22.64 seconds for the first quarter-mile and 45.16 for the half. He opened up a two length lead around the turn and easily held off the late run of Seeking the Soul to win by 2 3/4 lengths.

"I can't tell you how long I've been waiting for this," said McCarthy. "I thought he would love this racetrack. Backing up to one turn, where his best races were, I thought he would run away, and (he) did just that."

=== 2019: Pegasus World Cup and retirement ===
City of Light made his final start on January 26, 2019, in the Pegasus World Cup at Gulfstream Park. His main rival was Accelerate, who was also making his final start. City of Light had won the Breeders' Cup Dirt Mile on the same day Accelerate won the Breeders' Cup Classic at 1 1/4 miles. With the Pegasus World Cup set at the intermediate distance of 1 1/8 miles, the two were thought to be closely matched, with Accelerate going off as the slight favorite. The track was sloppy due to heavy rain that continued during the race itself. City of Light broke well to vie for the early lead, then settled behind Patternrecognition. Around the far turn, City of Light made his move, followed by Accelerate. However, Accelerate could not match the pace and City of Light continued to draw away, winning by 5 3/4 lengths over the late-closing Seeking the Soul.

"The way he did it today, you don't really see too many horses that have the speed, the pounce, and the dimension," said jockey Javier Castellano. "The horse did everything today. I just enjoyed the ride, to be honest with you. I think anyone could have ridden the horse." Castellano added that the horse had enjoyed the sloppy track. "He was like a little kid who wanted to play and splash in the puddles."

"We've been in business five years, and we started with one horse," said McCarthy. "To have a horse like this come into your life … I can't describe the emotions that go along with something like this."

After the Pegasus World Cup, City of Light was retired to stud at Lane's End Farm, where he joins Accelerate and his sire Quality Road. City of Light's fee for 2019 was set at $35,000.

== Statistics ==
Date	Age	Distance	Race	Grade	Track	Odds	Field	Finish	Winning Time	Winning (Losing) Margin	Jockey	Ref
Jul 6, 2017	3	6 furlongs	Maiden Special Weight		Los Alamitos	1.10*	8	2	1:10.28	(1 length)	Gary Stevens	
Sep 1, 2017	3	6 furlongs	Maiden Special Weight		Del Mar	5.20	10	1	1:09.35	7 1/2 lengths	Gary Stevens	
Oct 7, 2017	3	6 1/2 furlongs	Allowance Optional Claiming		Santa Anita	0.70*	5	2	1:16.01	(1 length)	Gary Stevens	
Nov 3, 2017	3	7 furlongs	Allowance Optional Claiming		Santa Anita	1.20*	12	2	1:22.90	(1 1/2 lengths)	Gary Stevens	
Dec 26, 2017	3	7 furlongs	Malibu Stakes	I	Santa Anita	7.50	9	1	1:21.21	2 lengths	Drayden Van Dyke	
Mar 10, 2018	4	7 furlongs	Triple Bend Stakes	I	Santa Anita	1.00*	5	1	1:21.35	1 1/2 lengths	Drayden Van Dyke	
Apr 14, 2018	4	1 1/8 miles	Oaklawn Handicap	II	Oaklawn Park	4.70	11	1	1:48.26	Neck	Drayden Van Dyke	
May 26, 2018	4	1 1/4 miles	Gold Cup at Santa Anita Stakes	I	Santa Anita	1.20*	6	3	2:01.38	(5 1/2 lengths)	Drayden Van Dyke	
Aug 25, 2018	4	7 furlongs	Forego Stakes	I	Saratoga	0.85*	8	2	1:21.46	(1 1/2 lengths)	Irad Ortiz Jr.	
Nov 3, 2018	4	1 mile	Breeders' Cup Dirt Mile	I	Churchill Downs	2.60	9	1	1:33.83	2 3/4 lengths	Javier Castellano	
Jan 26, 2019	5	1 1/8 miles	Pegasus World Cup	I	Gulfstream Park	1.90	12	1	1:47.71	5 3/4 lengths	Javier Castellano	

An asterisk after the odds means City of Light was the post-time favorite.

== Stud career ==
In 2023 City of Light stands at Lane's End Farm in Versailles, Kentucky, for US$35,000.

=== Notable progeny ===
c = colt, f = filly, g = gelding

Foaled	Name	Sex	Major Wins
2021	Fierceness	c	Breeders' Cup Juvenile, Florida Derby, Travers Stakes, Pacific Classic Stakes
2021	Formidable Man	c	Hollywood Derby
2024	Summer Starlet	f	Spinaway Stakes

== Pedigree ==
Pedigree of City of Light, bay horse, May 7, 2014
Sire Quality Road 2006	Elusive Quality; 1993	Gone West	Mr. Prospector
Sire Quality Road 2006	Elusive Quality; 1993	Gone West	Secrettame
Sire Quality Road 2006	Elusive Quality; 1993	Touch of Greatness	Hero's Honor
Sire Quality Road 2006	Elusive Quality; 1993	Touch of Greatness	Ivory Wand
Sire Quality Road 2006	Kobia; 1995	Strawberry Road (AUS)	Whiskey Road
Sire Quality Road 2006	Kobia; 1995	Strawberry Road (AUS)	Giftisa (NZ)
Sire Quality Road 2006	Kobia; 1995	Winglet	Alydar
Sire Quality Road 2006	Kobia; 1995	Winglet	Highest Trump
Dam Paris Notion 1998	Dehere; 1991	Deputy Minister	Vice Regent
Dam Paris Notion 1998	Dehere; 1991	Deputy Minister	Mint Copy
Dam Paris Notion 1998	Dehere; 1991	Sister Dot	Secretariat
Dam Paris Notion 1998	Dehere; 1991	Sister Dot	Sword Game
Dam Paris Notion 1998	Fabulous Notion; 1980	Somethingfabulous	Northern Dancer
Dam Paris Notion 1998	Fabulous Notion; 1980	Somethingfabulous	Somethingroyal
Dam Paris Notion 1998	Fabulous Notion; 1980	Careless Notion	Jester
Dam Paris Notion 1998	Fabulous Notion; 1980	Careless Notion	Miss Uppity (family: 2-e)
