= Romantic Proposal =

Irish Thoroughbred racehorse

- Sire: Raven's Pass
- Grandsire: Elusive Quality
- Dam: Playwithmyheart
- Damsire: Diktat
- Sex: Mare
- Foaled: 6 March 2016
- Country: Ireland
- Colour: Bay
- Breeder: Fastnet Stud
- Owner: Clipper Logistics Group
- Trainer: Edward Lynam
- Record: 18: 5-3-3
- Earnings: £281,992

Major wins
- Dubai Duty Free Dash (2021); Flying Five Stakes (2021); Woodlands Stakes (2022)

Romantic Proposal (foaled 6 March 2016) is an Irish Thoroughbred racehorse. She was unraced as a two-year-old and showed modest ability as a three-year-old in 2019 when she won two minor races from six attempts. She made progress at four to win a valuable sprint handicap race at the Curragh Racecourse. In 2021 she improved again to become a high-class sprinter, winning the Dubai Duty Free Dash before recording her biggest victory in the Group 1 Flying Five Stakes.

== Background ==
Romantic Proposal is a bay mare with a white star bred in Ireland by the County Kildare-based Fastnet Stud. As a foal in 2016 she was consigned to the Goffs November sale and was bought for €25,000 by Amy Lynam. In the following year she returned to Goffs for the Orby Yearling sale in September and was sold to Joe Foley for €55,000. She entered the ownership of the Clipper Logistics Group and was sent into training with Edward Lynam at Dunshaughlin, County Meath.

She was from the seventh crop of foals sired by Raven's Pass who won the Queen Elizabeth II Stakes in Europe but is best known for being the first horse trained in Britain to win the Breeders' Cup Classic. His other foals have included Royal Marine and Tower of London (Sprinters Stakes). Romantic Proposal's dam Playwithmyheart showed modest racing ability in France, winning one minor race from eight attempts. Her dam Treasure Trove also produced the Prix de la Foret winner Toylsome and was a half-sister to Leading Light. She was descended from the Kentucky-bred broodmare Monarchy, making her a distant relative of Round Table, Pulpit and Johannesburg.

== Racing career ==
=== 2019: three-year-old season ===
Romantic Proposal was ridden in her first five races by Declan McDonogh. Having been unraced as a juvenile and she began her racing career in a maiden race over eight and a half furlongs on good ground at Cork Racecourse on 20 April when she started a 33/1 outsider and came home third behind Georgeville, beaten five and a half lengths by the winner. She went on to finish second in similar events at Gowran Park in May and Navan Racecourse in June before running fourth at Killarney Racecourse in July. She was dropped back in distance for a seven furlong maiden at Cork on 1 September and recorded her first success as she took the lead inside the final furlong and won "comfortably" by 1 1/4 lengths from Lovee Dovee. A month later, the filly started at odds of 5/1 for a handicap race against older horses over the same course and distance. Ridden by Wayne Lordan she raced in mid-division before taking the lead a furlong out and recorded another comfortable success as she came home 2 1/2 lengths clear of the seven-year-old gelding Katiymann.

=== 2020: four-year-old season ===
The 2020 flat racing season in Europe was disrupted by the COVID-19 pandemic and Romantic Proposal did not race until 27 June when she ran sixth in a valuable handicap over seven furlongs at the Curragh. She was then dropped back to 6 1/2 furlongs for the Scurry Handicap on yielding ground at the same track three weeks later when she was partnered by Lordan and went off at odds of 11/2 in a sixteen-runner field. Carrying a weight of 118 pounds she raced towards the rear of the field before producing a strong late run to take the lead in the final stride and win by a short head from the six-year-old Gulliver. Romantic Proposal was then stepped up in class and finished fourth behind Make A Challenge in the Listed Curragh Sprint Stakes on 22 August. In September the filly ran sixth in a handicap at the Curragh and then made her first appearance in a Group 3 when she finished fourth to Ventura Rebel in the Renaissance Stakes. On her final start of the season she came home when starting favourite for the Listed Testimonial Stakes at the Curragh in October.

=== 2021: five-year-old season ===
Romantic Proposal began her third campaign in the Listed Sole Power Sprint Stakes over five furlongs at Naas Racecourse on 16 May when she started a 20/1 outsider and finished third to Logo Hunter and Back To Brussels after finishing strongly. In the Group 3 Ballyogan Stakes over six furlongs at the Curragh on 2 June she again produced a good late run but was beaten half a length into second place by the favourite Sonaiyla. Twenty-four days later, over the same course and distance, the mare was ridden by Chris Hayes when she started the 11/4 favourite in a sixteen-runner field for the Listed Dubai Duty Free Dash Stakes. After being restrained by Hayes in the early stages she made good progress in the last quarter mile, took the lead 100 metres from the finish and won "easily" by 1 1/2 lengths from the three-year-old filly Teresa Mendoza. After the race Eddie Lynam said "She's getting better. We took our time with her and didn't run her at two, progressed at three and this idiot thought she might be a miler! [The owners] have always had a horse with me and I've had a good bit of luck for them. We don't have many owners so it's nice to be able to do something good for them and they have been very patient. She was always going well but I thought we were running out of furlongs and then she got there in a heartbeat... I think she's a bit better than that but time will tell."

On 17 July Romantic Proposal was stepped up to Group 2 class for the Sapphire Stakes at the Curragh. Starting the 100/30 second choice in the betting she finished well but was unable to catch the leaders and finished third behind Mooneista and Gustavus Weston. Despite her defeat the mare was moved to the highest level to contest the Group 1 Flying Five Stakes at the Curragh on 12 September in which she was partnered by Hayes and started at odds of 16/1 in a thirteen-runner field. The British-trained colt Dragon Symbol (second in the July Cup) started favourite while the other contenders included Glass Slippers, Winter Power, Mooneista, Gustavus Weston and Rohaan (Wokingham Stakes). Winter Power set the pace with Romantic Proposal settling behind the leaders before making progress in the last quarter mile. Glass Slippers took the lead a furlong out but Romantic Proposal maintained her run, gained the advantage in the closing stages and won by half a length from the 33/1 outsider A Case of You. Lynam, whose last win at the highest level had come when Sole Power took the same race in 2015, said "It's six years since I had a group 1 winner... it's nice to have another. Days like this make it all worthwhile... She's just kept improving. I always believed, the way she was progressing, she was capable of running a big race... she did everything great."

In October Romantic Proposal was sent to France to contest the Prix de l'Abbaye over 1000 metres at Longchamp Racecourse. She went off the 6.3/1 fourth choice in the betting but never looked likely to win and came home tenth of the fourteen runners behind A Case of You, beaten nine lengths by the winner.

== Pedigree ==
Pedigree of Romantic Proposal (IRE), bay mare, 2016
Sire Raven's Pass (USA) 2005	Elusive Quality (USA); 1993	Gone West	Mr Prospector
Sire Raven's Pass (USA) 2005	Elusive Quality (USA); 1993	Gone West	Secrettame
Sire Raven's Pass (USA) 2005	Elusive Quality (USA); 1993	Touch of Greatness	Hero's Honor
Sire Raven's Pass (USA) 2005	Elusive Quality (USA); 1993	Touch of Greatness	Ivory Wand
Sire Raven's Pass (USA) 2005	Ascutney (USA); 1994	Lord At War (ARG)	General (FR)
Sire Raven's Pass (USA) 2005	Ascutney (USA); 1994	Lord At War (ARG)	Luna de Miel
Sire Raven's Pass (USA) 2005	Ascutney (USA); 1994	Right Word	Verbatim
Sire Raven's Pass (USA) 2005	Ascutney (USA); 1994	Right Word	Oratorio
Dam Playwithmyheart (GB) 2006	Diktat (GB); 1995	Warning	Known Fact (USA)
Dam Playwithmyheart (GB) 2006	Diktat (GB); 1995	Warning	Slightly Dangerous (USA)
Dam Playwithmyheart (GB) 2006	Diktat (GB); 1995	Arvola	Sadler's Wells (USA)
Dam Playwithmyheart (GB) 2006	Diktat (GB); 1995	Arvola	Park Appeal (IRE)
Dam Playwithmyheart (GB) 2006	Treasure Trove; 1989 (USA)	The Minstrel (CAN)	Northern Dancer
Dam Playwithmyheart (GB) 2006	Treasure Trove; 1989 (USA)	The Minstrel (CAN)	Fleur
Dam Playwithmyheart (GB) 2006	Treasure Trove; 1989 (USA)	River Jig	Irish River (FR)
Dam Playwithmyheart (GB) 2006	Treasure Trove; 1989 (USA)	River Jig	Baronova (Family: 2-f)
