= 2008 Breeders' Cup Classic =

Thoroughbred horse race

25th Breeders' Cup Classic
- Breeders' Cup Classic
- Location: Santa Anita Park
- Date: October 25, 2008
- Winning horse: Raven's Pass
- Jockey: Frankie Dettori
- Trainer: John Gosden
- Owner: Princess Haya of Jordan and Darley Stable
- Conditions: Fast
- Surface: Synthetic dirt
- Attendance: 51,331

The 2008 Breeders' Cup Classic was the 25th running of the Breeders' Cup Classic, part of the 2008 Breeders' Cup World Thoroughbred Championships program. It was run on October 25, 2008, at Santa Anita Park in Arcadia, California over a synthetic dirt surface.

Defending Horse of the Year Curlin was the odds-on favourite after winning several major races including the Dubai World Cup. However, he did not handle the track well and finished fourth, behind the American-bred but English-trained longshot Raven's Pass.

The Classic is run at a distance of one mile and one-quarter (approximately 2000 m) with a purse of $5,000,000. It is normally run on a dirt surface but in 2008 was run over synthetic dirt. It is run under weight-for-age conditions, with entrants carrying the following weights:

- Northern Hemisphere three-year-olds: 122 lb
- Southern Hemisphere three-year-olds: 117 lb
- Four-year-olds and up: 126 lb

== Contenders ==
Curlin won the 2007 Breeders' Cup Classic on his way to Horse of the Year honors and started his 2008 campaign by taking the Dubai World Cup, followed by wins in Stephen Foster, Woodward and Jockey Club Gold Cup. His only loss in 2008 came in his first attempt on the turf in the Man o' War Stakes, at a time when his owner was considering an attempt at the Prix de l'Arc de Triomphe. Despite his excellent form throughout the year, Curlin had never raced on a synthetic dirt surface and was only entered in the race after a successful workout on October 14.

The field for the Classic was weakened when Big Brown, winner of the Kentucky Derby, Preakness and Haskell, was retired shortly before entries were taken due to injury. That left Colonel John, winner of the Santa Anita Derby, as the leading three-year-old contender from North America in the race.

In part because of the synthetic dirt surface, a large European contingent shipped to California for the Breeders' Cup events, including three entries in the Classic. With five Group I wins, Duke of Marmalade was the most highly regarded by the North American bettors at odds of 9-1, followed by Raven's Pass at 13-1. Henrythenavigator had defeated Raven's Pass in three of their four meetings, all at a mile, but was largely dismissed at 19-1 in the U.S. In England though, his odds were as short as 4-1. Raven's Pass had been regularly ridden by Jimmy Fortune in his European races but Fortune gave up the mount for the Breeders' Cup after incurring a suspension which prevented him riding for 11 days before the race. After discussing the ride with trainer Gosden, Fortune stepped down and Frankie Dettori took over.

== Race Description ==
Casino Drive set the early pace, with Curlin racing near the back of the pack behind Henrythenavigator and Raven's Pass tracking a few lengths further behind. Going into the final turn, the three started making up ground, with Henrythenavigator on the inside and Raven's Pass racing wide on the outside. Curlin kicked as they turned into the stretch and passed the early leaders with a furlong to go. Raven's Pass then made his run and accelerated by Curlin. Henrythenavigator maneuvered around horses to find racing room and closed well to finish second, beaten by 3/4 of a length. Tiago also made a late run to finish third with Curlin holding on for fourth. The time was 1:59.27, a new track record.

Curlin's trainer Steve Asmussen blamed the loss on the synthetic dirt surface, saying "It was a turf race." The biggest mystery was why Curlin, a horse of proven stamina, faded late, while two European horses who specialized at a distance of a mile were able to outrun him in the stretch. Curlin may have made his move too soon, as the track appeared to favor horses who made late runs.

Frankie Dettori, the jockey of Raven's Pass, was commended for an excellent ride. "The last furlong was a pretty long run," he said, "but I could feel [Raven's Pass] was still galloping strongly. When I crossed the line, I didn't know if it was true or a dream, but I realised straight away that it was true and I'm delighted."

Raven's Pass became the first British-based horse to win the Classic, although it was something of a homecoming for his trainer John Gosden, who had spent 11 years in Southern California before returning to England. "It doesn't get any better than this", he said. "All our great friends are here, from the guys that are raking up in the shed areas to the owners, trainers, and jockeys. If you think it's going to get better than that, you're really a greedy so-and-so. To me, this is a dream come true and a day I'll cherish the rest of my life."

"I had no doubts that the horse could get a mile and an eighth", he said later. "I didn't know about the last eighth of a mile, but I suspected it with Lord at War as his broodmare sire. There is good stamina on the dam side. And the way he trained – he's so relaxed now – that I was actually quite confident that he would get it well and he certainly did."

== Results ==
Finish	Program Number	Margin (lengths)	Horse	Jockey	Trainer	Final Odds	Winnings
1st	8	1 3/4	Raven's Pass	Frankie Dettori	John Gosden	13.50	2,700,000
2nd	5	3/4	Henrythenavigator	John R. Velazquez	Aidan O'Brien	19.00	1,000,000
3rd	3	Neck	Tiago	Mike E. Smith	John Shirreffs	15.20	500,000
4th	9	1 3/4	Curlin	Robby Albarado	Steve Asmussen	0.90	255,000
5th	1	1/2	Go Between	Garrett Gomez	William I. Mott	8.00	125,000
6th	11	Neck	Colonel John	Edgar Prado	Eoin Hary	10.30	
7th	6	Nose	Smooth Air	Rafael Bejarano	Bennie Stutts Jr.	49.50	
8th	12	3/4	Champs Elysees (GB)	Alan Garcia	Robert J. Frankel	23.20	
9th	4	7	Duke of Marmalade (IRE)	Johnny Murtagh	Aidan O'Brien	9.50	
10th	10	1 3/4	Fairbanks	Richard Migliore	Todd Pletcher	40.10	
11th	7	6 1/4	Student Council	Shaun Bridgmohan	Steven Asmussen	44.10	
12th	2		Casino Drive	Victor Espinoza	Yamamoto Hidetoshi	9.90	

Source: Equibase
Times: 1/4 – 0:23.77; 1/2 – 0:47.60; 3/4 – 1:11.64; mile – 1:35.48; final – 1:59.27.
Fractional Splits: (:23.77) (:23.83) (:24.04) (:23.84) (:23.79)

== Payout ==
Payout Schedule:

Program Number	Horse	Win	Place	Show
8	Raven's Pass	29.00	15.80	8.00
5	Henrythenavigator		22.00	11.20
3	Tiago			7.00

- $1 Exacta (8-5) Paid $159.50
- $1 Trifecta (8-5-3) Paid $2,395.00
- $1 Superfecta (8-5-3-9) Paid $10,236.00
