= Royal Marine (horse) =

Racehorse trained in Britain

- Racing silks of Godolphin
- Sire: Raven's Pass
- Grandsire: Elusive Quality
- Dam: Inner Secret
- Damsire: Singspiel
- Sex: Gelding
- Foaled: 26 April 2016
- Country: Ireland
- Colour: Bay
- Breeder: Godolphin
- Owner: Godolphin
- Trainer: Saeed bin Suroor
- Record: 13: 2-1-0
- Earnings: £228,231

Major wins
- Prix Jean-Luc Lagardère (2018)

Royal Marine (foaled 26 April 2016) is an Irish-bred Thoroughbred racehorse. As a two-year-old in 2018 he was one of the best colts of his generation in Europe, winning two of his three races including the Prix Jean-Luc Lagardère. He failed to reproduce his juvenile form in 2019 and was gelded. He ran five times in 2020 without success.

== Background ==
Royal Marine is a bay horse with a narrow white stripe bred and owned by Sheikh Mohammed's Godolphin organisation. He was sent into training with Saeed bin Suroor, whose stable is based at Newmarket, Suffolk in the summer with most of the horses relocating to Godolphin's Dubai training centre in winter.

He was sired by Raven's Pass who showed top class form in Europe but is best known for being the only horse trained in Britain to win the Breeders' Cup Classic. His other foals have included Secret Number (Bosphorus Cup) and Richard Pankhurst (Hungerford Stakes). Royal Marine's dam Inner Secret, a half-sister to Dubai Destination, finished third on her only start but produced at least three other winners. Mysterial, the dam of Inner Secret and Dubai Destination, was a half-sister to Agnes World.

== Racing career ==
=== 2018: two-year-old season ===
Royal Marine made his debut in a minor race over six furlongs at Newmarket Racecourse on 25 August in which he was ridden by Pat Cosgrave and started the 9/4 second favourite in an eleven-runner field. He was "unruly" in the starting stalls and failed to live up to expectations in the race as he came home sixth behind Jash, more than twelve lengths behind the winner. Oisin Murphy took the ride when the colt started at odds of 11/2 for a seven furlong maiden race at Doncaster Racecourse on 14 September. Royal Marine led from the start and recorded his first success as he came home two and a quarter lengths clear of the John Gosden-trained Turgenev.

On 7 October Royal Marine was sent to France and moved up sharply in class to contest the Group 1 Prix Jean-Luc Lagardère over 1600 metres at Longchamp Racecourse. Ridden by Murphy he started the 5/1 third choice in the betting behind Anodor (Prix des Chênes) and Boitron (Denford Stakes), while the other three runners were Broome (runner-up in the Juvenile Stakes), Shaman and Dark Jedi. After racing in second place behind Broome, Royal Marine took the lead in the straight and stayed on well to win by a neck with Anodor three quarters of a length back in third place. After the race Saeed bin Suroor said "Royal Marine has been good since he won at Doncaster last time. What I like about him is he stays well, but he also has plenty of speed. He's a big, strong horse and in the future he could be anything. He's still a baby and he will be better in the future. We'll talk to Sheikh Mohammed and make a decision about what we are going to do".

=== 2019: three-year-old season ===
In the winter of 2018/19 Royal Marine was sent to Godolphin's base in the United Arab Emirates and made his three-year-old debut when finishing fourth in the UAE 2000 Guineas Trial at Meydan Racecourse on 10 January. On his return to Europe the colt started the 13/8 favourite for the Craven Stakes (a major trial for the 2000 Guineas) over the Rowley Mile at Newmarket. Ridden as on his previous start by Christophe Soumillon he pulled hard in the early stages before coming home fourth of the eight runners behind Skardu. In the 2000 Guineas at Newmarket on 4 May he never looked likely to take a hand in the finish and came home tenth behind Magna Grecia, beaten more than sixteen lengths by the winner. At Royal Ascot in June he started a 33/1 outsider for the St James's Palace Stakes and finished unplaced behind Circus Maximus. In July he finished last of the twelve runners behind Too Darn Hot in the Prix Jean Prat at Deauville Racecourse. A month later he was gelded.

=== 2020: four-year-old season ===
In 2020 Royal Marine returned to the track to compete in handicap raced but failed to win in five starts. After finishing unplaced in two races at Meydan early in the year he returned to Europe and finished fourth over seven furlongs at Newmarket in August. Later that month he ran fifth on the Polytrack surface at Chelmsford City Racecourse. On his final run of the season he was moved up in distance and produced a better effort over ten furlongs at Newbury Racecourse in September, finishing second by a neck to the three-year-old Ilaraab after encountering trouble in running.

== Pedigree ==
Pedigree of Royal Marine (IRE), bay colt, 2016
Sire Raven's Pass (USA) 2005	Elusive Quality; 1993	Gone West	Mr. Prospector
Sire Raven's Pass (USA) 2005	Elusive Quality; 1993	Gone West	Secrettame
Sire Raven's Pass (USA) 2005	Elusive Quality; 1993	Touch of Greatness	Hero's Honor
Sire Raven's Pass (USA) 2005	Elusive Quality; 1993	Touch of Greatness	Ivory Wand
Sire Raven's Pass (USA) 2005	Ascutney; 1994	Lord At War (ARG)	General (FR)
Sire Raven's Pass (USA) 2005	Ascutney; 1994	Lord At War (ARG)	Luna de Miel
Sire Raven's Pass (USA) 2005	Ascutney; 1994	Right Word	Verbatim
Sire Raven's Pass (USA) 2005	Ascutney; 1994	Right Word	Oratorio
Dam Inner Secret (USA) 2008	Singspiel (IRE); 1992	In The Wings (GB)	Sadler's Wells (USA)
Dam Inner Secret (USA) 2008	Singspiel (IRE); 1992	In The Wings (GB)	High Hawk (IRE)
Dam Inner Secret (USA) 2008	Singspiel (IRE); 1992	Glorious Song (CAN)	Halo (USA)
Dam Inner Secret (USA) 2008	Singspiel (IRE); 1992	Glorious Song (CAN)	Ballade (USA)
Dam Inner Secret (USA) 2008	Mysterial; 1994	Alleged	Hoist The Flag
Dam Inner Secret (USA) 2008	Mysterial; 1994	Alleged	Princess Pout
Dam Inner Secret (USA) 2008	Mysterial; 1994	Mysteries	Seattle Slew
Dam Inner Secret (USA) 2008	Mysterial; 1994	Mysteries	Phydilla (FR) (Family 6-b)
