= 2008 Breeders' Cup =

Thoroughbred horse racing event

The 2008 Breeders' Cup World Championships was the 25th edition of the premier event of the North American Thoroughbred horse racing year. It took place on October 24 and 25 during the Oak Tree meeting at Santa Anita Park in Arcadia, California. The Breeders' Cup is generally regarded as the end of the North America racing season, although a few Grade I events take place in later November and December. The 2008 Breeders' Cup results were influential in the Eclipse Award divisional championship voting.

The Friday racecard featured five Breeders' Cup races for fillies and mares, culminating in Zenyatta's win in the Ladies Classic. On Saturday, the European contingent won five races, capped by an upset by English-based Raven's Pass over heavy favorite Curlin in the Classic.

== Lead-up ==
Santa Anita racetrack hosted the Breeders' Cup for the fourth time in 2008. It was the first time that the event had been held on a synthetic dirt surface instead of natural dirt, as Santa Anita had changed to a Pro Ride surface in 2007 in response to a state mandate aimed at increasing the safety of the sport for both horses and jockeys. The change was of concern to both horsemen and bettors as it was difficult to predict which horses would respond well to the new surface and which would struggle. However, the change was expected to increase interest from European trainers, many of whom had access to similar all weather tracks.

For the second year in a row, three races were added to the Breeders' Cup roster, bringing the total up to 14. In 2007, the Dirt Mile, Juvenile Turf and Filly & Mare Sprint had been added while in 2008, the Marathon, Juvenile Fillies Turf and Turf Sprint were added. The new races were intended to help fill out the Friday card and increase the range of options available to horsemen, particularly those from overseas. By rule, the new races could not be graded until their third renewal.

Breeders' Cup officials decided to rearrange the racecards so that all five races for fillies and mares were held on Friday. "By shifting some of our traditional Saturday races to Friday, we ensure that Friday stands on its own as an international competition of the highest level", said Breeders Cup President and CEO Greg Avioli. "This new format provides a great stage to showcase the talents of the best female Thoroughbreds in the world." They also renamed the Distaff as the Ladies' Classic and instituted a ban on steroids.

Because of the synthetic dirt surface, some horsemen from the East Coast hesitated to attend the event. In particular, Curlin, the defending Horse of the Year and winner of the 2007 Classic, did not commit to entering until after a strong workout at Santa Anita on October 14. In part because of the three new races, a record 180 horses were pre-entered, including a record 35 from Europe.

The Friday races were broadcast on ESPN2. The Saturday card was broadcast on ESPN and ABC. Attendance was up slightly compared to 2007, with the excellent weather being credited. The two-day handle also increased by 5.5% to $155.5 million. However, attendance on Saturday was lower than on previous renewals held at Santa Anita, with high ticket prices cited as the major cause. The Saturday on-track handle was also the lowest since 1999, which was not unexpected given the 2008 economic downturn.

== Results ==
The highlight of the Friday card was Zenyatta's dominant win in the Ladies Classic. The four-year-old filly came into the race undefeated but was facing the best field of her career, with four Grade I winning fillies shipping in from New York alone. Zenyatta broke last and continued to trail the field for the first 3/4 of a mile before beginning her drive on the far turn. She quickly made up ground while circling wide and swept to the lead down the stretch, winning comfortably by 1 1/2 lengths. She received a standing ovation from the crowd on returning to the winner's circle.

Ventura was also a stand-out winner in the Filly & Mare Sprint, winning by the largest margin of the day while finishing just 0.01 second behind the track record. Stardom Bound won the Juvenile Fillies impressively while Maram just held off Heart Shaped by a nose in the Juvenile Fillies Turf.

In the Classic, the favorite was Curlin, who raced near the back of the field then made his move on the turn, striking the lead at the top of the stretch. Raven's Pass and Henrythenavigator, outstanding milers from Europe, accelerated past Curlin and finished first and second respectively. Tiago closed late to finish third.

In the Turf, Conduit was the second favorite because of his earlier win in the St Leger. Jockey Ryan Moore placed Conduit in the middle of the pack, then released him in the stretch where he out-kicked the others. It was Moore's first win at the Breeders' Cup but he was not available for comment after the race. "He's rushing off to the airport as he has to ride in France tomorrow," explained Conduit's trainer Sir Michael Stoute. "He's a big talent with a great racing brain and you'll be hearing a lot more of him."

Other highlights included the French filly Goldikova taking on male horses and winning in the Mile. Her trainer Freddie Head compared her favorably to champion Miesque, who he had ridden to victory in the Mile in 1987 and 1988. Midnight Lute won the Sprint for the second year in a row, which also gave Garrett Gomez his third win of the day and fourth over the two days – a record. Midshipman won the Juvenile to establish himself as the early favorite for the Kentucky Derby.

All told, European-based horses won a record five races at the Breeders' Cup: Raven's Pass in the Classic, Goldikova in the Mile, Donativum in the Juvenile Turf, Muhannak in the Marathon and Conduit in the Turf. Although this was partially credited to the artificial dirt surface, because of the increase in the number of races, it was proportional to their previous highs of three wins out of seven races in 1993 at Santa Anita and three wins in eight races in 2001 at Belmont, where they also finished second in the Classic.

In the 2008 Eclipse Award voting, five of the eleven flat racing categories were awarded to horses who won at the Breeders' Cup: Stardom Bound (Champion Two-Year-Old Female), Midshipman (Champion Two-Year-Old Male), Zenyatta (Champion Older Female), Conduit (Champion Male Turf Horse) and Forever Together (Champion Female Turf Horse). In addition, Curlin was voted Horse of the Year and Champion Older Male despite his fourth-place finish in the Classic.

=== Female Championship Friday ===
The attendance was 31,257

Race name	Sponsor	Distance	Restrictions	Purse	Winner	Odds	Margin
Filly & Mare Sprint	Sentient Flight	7 furlongs	Fillies & Mares	$1 million	Ventura	2.80	4 lengths
Juvenile Fillies Turf	Grey Goose	1 mile – turf	2-year-old fillies	$1 million	Maram	11.10	Nose
Juvenile Fillies	Bessemer Trust	1 1/16 miles	2-year-old fillies	$2 million	Stardom Bound	1.60	1 1/2 lengths
Filly & Mare Turf	Emirates	1 1/4 miles	3yrs+ fillies & mares	$2 million	Forever Together	4.90	1 3/4 lengths
Ladies' Classic		1 1/8 miles	3yrs+ fillies & mares	$2 million	Zenyatta	0.50	1 1/2 lengths

Source: Equibase

=== Saturday: Day 2 ===
Race name	Sponsor	Distance	Restrictions	Purse	Winner	Odds	Margin
Marathon		1 1/2 miles	3 yrs+	$500,000	Muhannak (IRE)	12.40	Head
Turf Sprint		ab. 6 1/2 furlongs – turf	3 yrs+	$1 million	Desert Code	36.50	1/2 length
Dirt Mile	TVG Network	1 mile	3 yrs+	$1 million	Albertus Maximus	6.30	1 1/4 lengths
Mile		1 mile – turf	3 yrs+	$2 million	Goldikova	1.80	1 1/4 lengths
Juvenile	Bessemer Trust	1 1/16 miles	2-year-old colts & geldings	$2 million	Midshipman	3.60	1 1/4 lengths
Juvenile Turf	Grey Goose	1 mile – turf	2-year-old colts & geldings	$1 million	Donativum	5.80	1 1/2 lengths
Sprint	Sentient Flight	6 furlongs	3 yrs+	$2 million	Midnight Lute	2.70	1 3/4 lengths
Turf	Emirates	1 1/2 miles – turf	3 yrs+	$3 million	Conduit	5.80	1 1/2 lengths
Classic		1 1/4 miles	3 yrs+	$5 million	Raven's Pass	13.50	1 3/4 lengths

Source: Equibase
