= 2009 Breeders' Cup Classic =

Thoroughbred horse race

26th Breeders' Cup Classic
- Breeders' Cup Classic
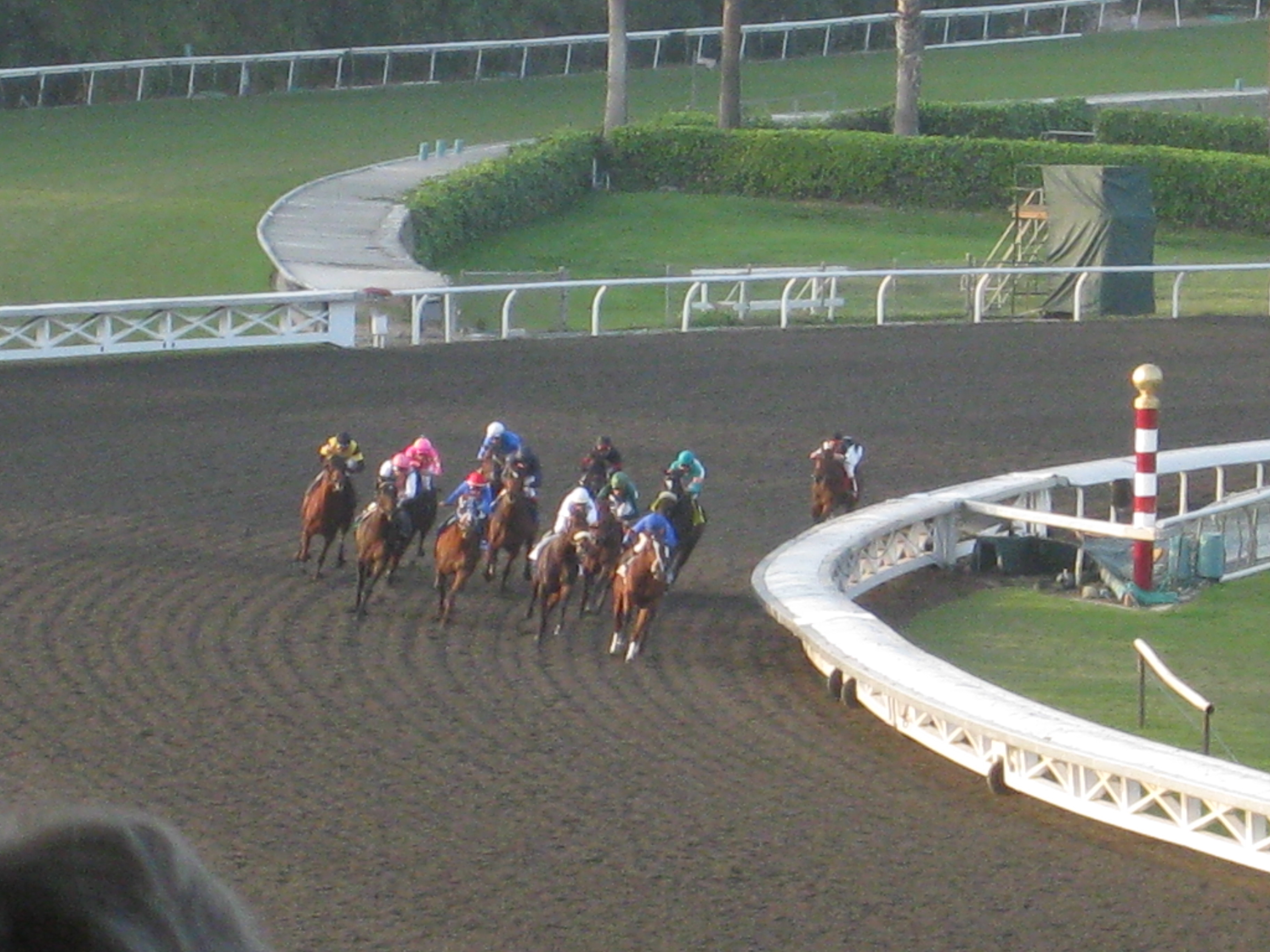
- Zenyatta (rider with turquoise cap) saves ground around the far turn
- Location: Santa Anita Park
- Date: November 7, 2009
- Winning horse: Zenyatta
- Jockey: Mike E. Smith
- Trainer: John Shirreffs
- Owner: Jerry and Ann Moss
- Conditions: fast
- Surface: Synthetic dirt
- Attendance: 58,825

The 2009 Breeders' Cup Classic was the 26th running of the Breeders' Cup Classic, part of the 2009 Breeders' Cup World Thoroughbred Championships program. It was run on November 7, 2009, at Santa Anita Park in Arcadia, California with a purse of $5,000,000.

For the first time in the race's history, a mare won when Zenyatta closed from last place to win by a length. The race was named the NTRA Moment of the Year.

The Classic is run at a distance of one mile and one-quarter (approximately 2000 m). It is normally run on a dirt surface but in 2009 was run on a synthetic surface. It is run under weight-for-age conditions, with entrants carrying the following weights:

- Northern Hemisphere three-year-olds: 122 pounds (55 kg)
- Southern Hemisphere three-year-olds: 117 pounds (53 kg)
- Four-year-olds and up: 126 pounds (57 kg)
- Any fillies or mares receive a 3 pounds (1.4 kg) allowance

== Contenders ==
In 2008, European-based horses finished one-two in the Classic, a result that many attributed to the synthetic surface used at Santa Anita. California had adopted synthetic surfaces starting in 2007 due to safety concerns but many horsemen and bettors felt that the synthetics performed more like turf than dirt. As a result, a few East Coast racehorses who had only raced on natural dirt surfaces did not ship to Santa Anita for the Breeders' Cup. Most notably, the connections of the outstanding filly Rachel Alexandra announced that she would not race on "plastic".

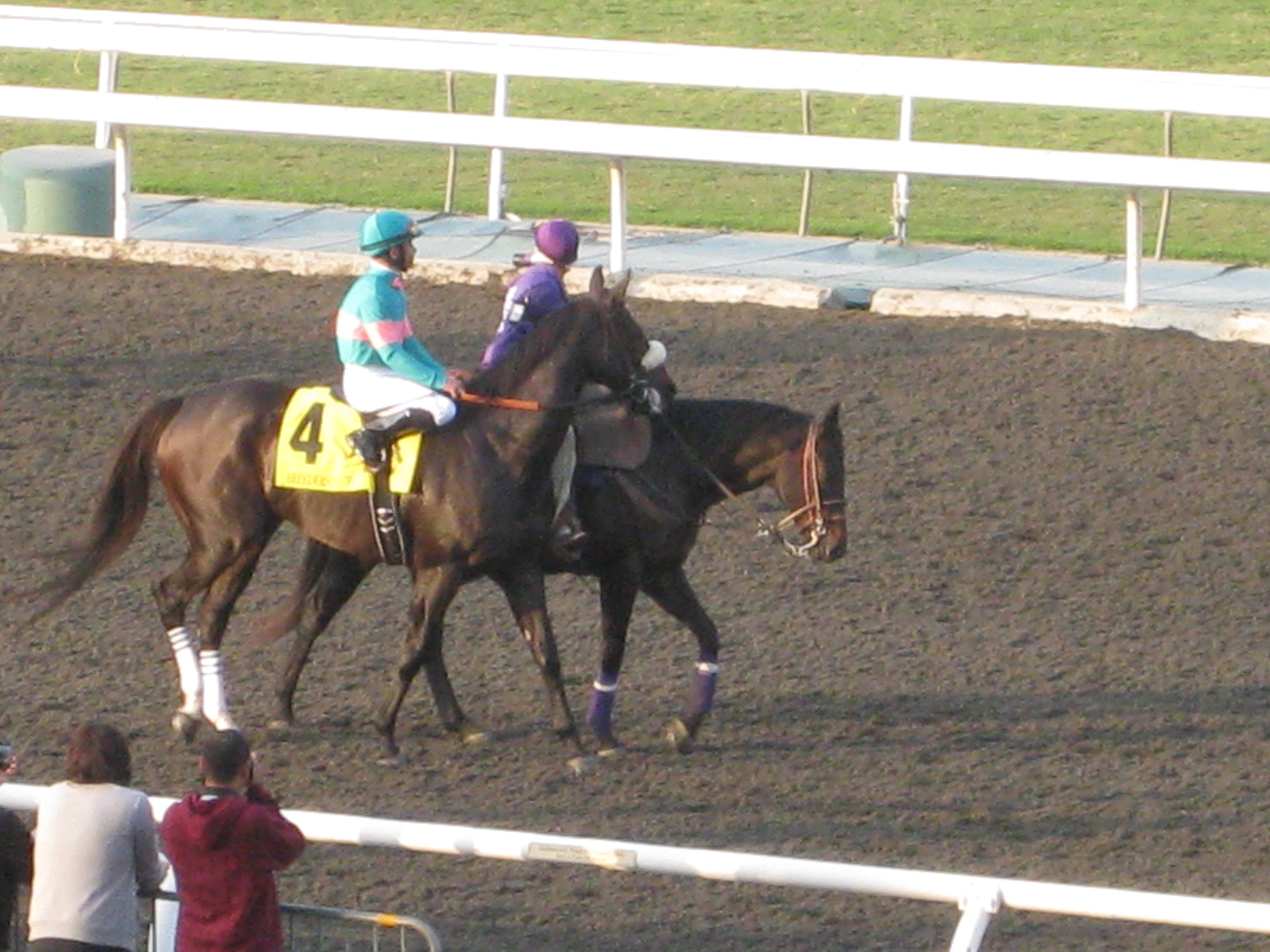
Zenyatta in the post parade

Instead, the favorite for the race was Zenyatta, who in 2008 had won the Ladies Classic and was named the Champion Older Female Horse. Zenyatta came into the Classic undefeated in thirteen career starts and was, with Rachel Alexandra, one of the most popular horses in recent memory. However, some handicappers questioned her credentials. As a California-based horse, she had demonstrated her ability to win on synthetic but was viewed as having faced inferior competition to that on the East Coast. She also had never raced against male horses, had never run at 1 1/4 miles, and in previous races had recorded Beyer Speed Figures that were unexceptional for a Grade I winner.

She was part of a thirteen horse field that included eight other Grade I/Group One winners from three countries. The most highly regarded contenders were:

- Summer Bird, winner of the Belmont, Travers and Jockey Club Gold Cup. Untested on synthetic
- Mine That Bird, winner of the Kentucky Derby and runner-up to Rachel Alexandra in the Preakness Stakes
- Rip Van Winkle, winner of the Sussex Stakes and Queen Elizabeth II Stakes in Europe
- Twice Over, winner of the Champion Stakes
- Gio Ponti, the top-ranked turf horse in America whose wins included the Arlington Million
- Quality Road, winner of the Florida Derby
- Einstein, a graded stakes winner on turf, dirt and synthetic, including the Santa Anita Handicap
- Colonel John, who won the 2008 Santa Anita Derby and Travers
- Richard's Kid, winner of the Pacific Classic

== Race description ==
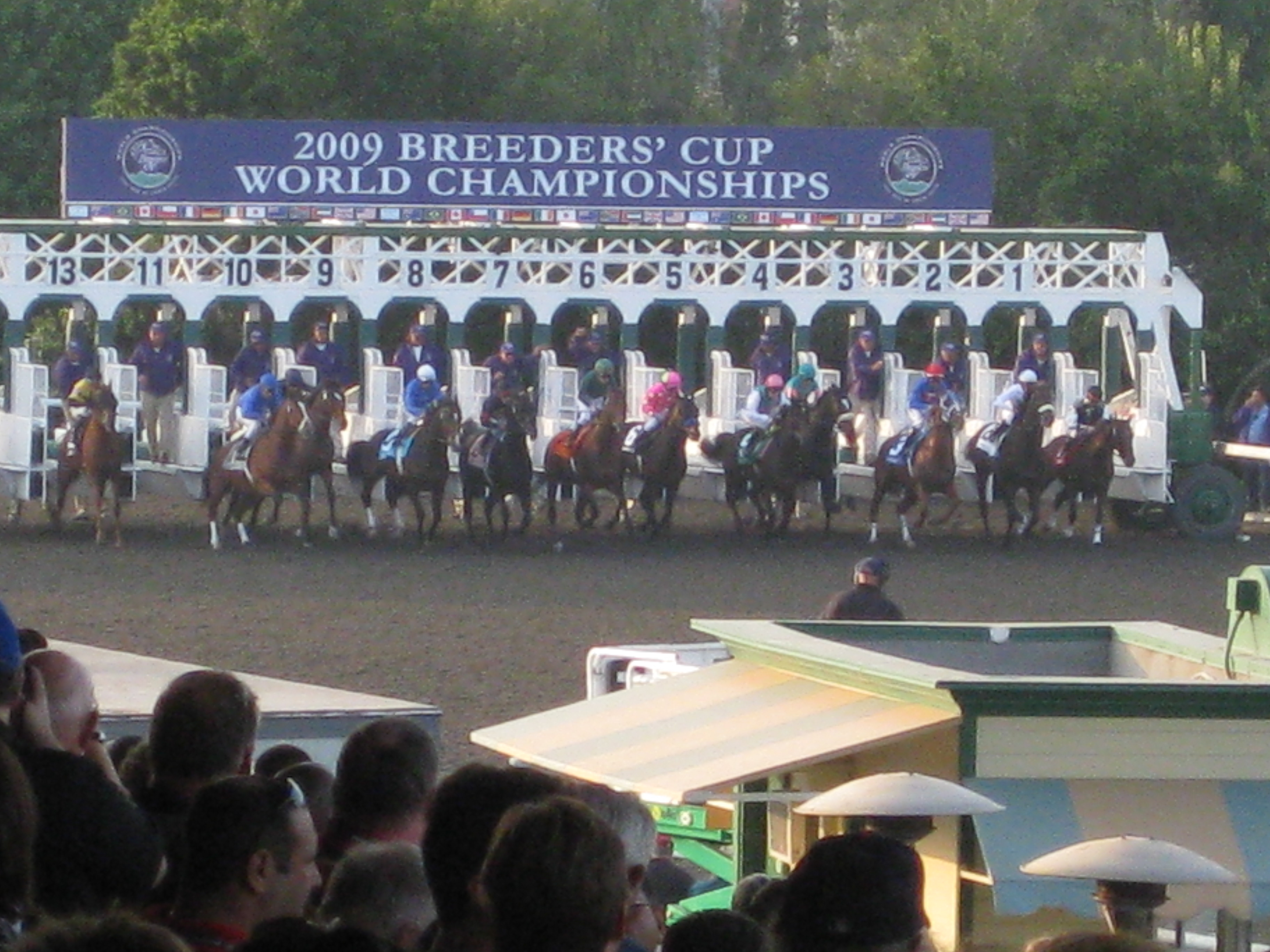
Start of 2009 Breeders Cup Classic at Santa Anita

In post position four, Zenyatta was initially reluctant to enter the starting gate. Then Quality Road in post position twelve started acting up, delaying the start of the race by five minutes when he refused to load even after being blindfolded. When he injured himself kicking the gate, he was scratched. The rest of the field was unloaded due to the delay and then reloaded.

When the race finally began, Zenyatta broke poorly and got off on the wrong lead. As was her custom, she dropped to the back of the field and trailed by as much as fifteen lengths. Down the backstretch, she had passed only one horse and was still about a dozen lengths behind. She started her move around the final turn, with jockey Mike Smith keeping her close to the rail to save ground. Track announcer Trevor Denman had kept an eye on the mare throughout the race, noting she had a lot of work to do at the top of the stretch, and saying "If she wins this, she'll be a superhorse!"

Turning into the stretch, Zenyatta faced a wall of horses in front of her, so Smith angled her away from the rail. When she finally had running room in mid-stretch, she was still in sixth place but closed ground rapidly. As she moved to the lead, announcer Trevor Denman exclaimed, "Zenyatta is flying on the grandstand side! This. Is. Un-be-liev-ABLE! Zenyatta! What a performance, one we’ll never forget!"

Zenyatta eventually won by a length. Gio Ponti, who had received an excellent trip on the rail, finished second while Twice Over was third.

After moderate opening fractions, the time for the race was a solid 2:00.62. Nearly seven lengths behind with a quarter-mile remaining, Zenyatta ran the final quarter-mile in 23 seconds flat. It was the first time that a female horse had "beat the boys" in the Classic. Zenyatta was given a hero's welcome on her return to the winner's circle, with many fans holding signs honoring 'Queen Z.'

After the race, Smith described the run. "I had to hit her out of the stall," he said. "Then she was on her left lead and you want to be on your right down the straight. Then she gathered herself up... At the half-mile (pole), they were stacked up... but then it was like the parting of the sea as it opened up down there. She won it well within herself, believe it or not." He also said, "I believe if there was another horse ahead of Gio Ponti, she would have caught him, too. She still had run left." "She is all heart," said trainer John Shirreffs. "The way the crowd took to her was just amazing. They cheered for her, they clapped for her. They love her. What a wonderful relationship."

Even veteran horsemen were moved by Zenyatta's performance and the crowd's reaction. "I switched camps at the eighth pole," said Bob Baffert, the trainer of Richard's Kid. "When I saw my horse wasn't going to win, I started yelling for Zenyatta... I have never seen a grandstand like that; nobody wanted to leave. The crowd was captivated. It felt like a horse had just won the Triple Crown." "She's a freak, what can I say?" said Gio Ponti's trainer Christophe Clement. "My horse ran a great race but he couldn't beat her."

The race was named the NTRA Moment of the Year.

== Results ==
Finish	Program Number	Margin (lengths)	Horse	Jockey	Trainer	Final Odds	Winnings
1st	4	1 length	Zenyatta	Mike Smith	John Shirreffs	2.80	2,700,000
2nd	7	1 1/4 lengths	Gio Ponti	Ramon Dominguez	Christophe Clement	12.00	900,000
3rd	5	3/4 lengths	Twice Over (GB)	Thomas Queally	Henry Cecil	9.20	495,000
4th	3	1 1/2 lengths	Summer Bird	Kent Desormeaux	Tim Ice	6.80	300,000
5th	2	1 length	Colonel John	Garrett Gomez	Eoin Harty	11.90	150,000
6th	6	1 length	Richard's Kid	Alex Solis	Bob Baffert	11.40	
7th	13	3 1/2 lengths	Awesome Gem	David Flores	Craig Dollase	52.10	
8th	11	3/4 lengths	Regal Ransom	Richard Migliore	Saeed bin Suroor	39.10	
9th	1	6 1/4 lengths	Mine That Bird	Calvin Borel	Bennie Wooley Jr.	14.40	
10th	10	2 lengths	Rip Van Winkle (IRE)	John Murtagh	Aidan O'Brien	3.40	
11th	8	9 3/4 lengths	Einstein (BRZ)	Julien Leparoux	Helen Pitts	10.40	
12th	9		Girolamo	Alan Garcia	Saeed bin Suroor	25.20	

Quality Road was scratched

Source: Equibase

Times: 1/4 – 0:24.16; 1/2 – 0:47.88; 3/4 – 1:11.88; mile – 1:36.16; final – 2:00.62
Fractional Splits: (:24.16) (:23.72) (:24.00) (:24.28) (:24.46)

== Payout ==
Payout Schedule:

Program Number	Horse	Win	Place	Show
4	Zenyatta	7.60	5.60	3.80
7	Gio Ponti		9.20	6.60
5	Twice Over (GB)			7.00

- $1 Exacta (4-7) Paid $43.70
- $1 Trifecta (4-7-5) Paid $596.20
- $1 Superfecta (4-7-5-3) Paid $3,417.00
