= Abel Tasman (horse) =

American Thoroughbred racehorse

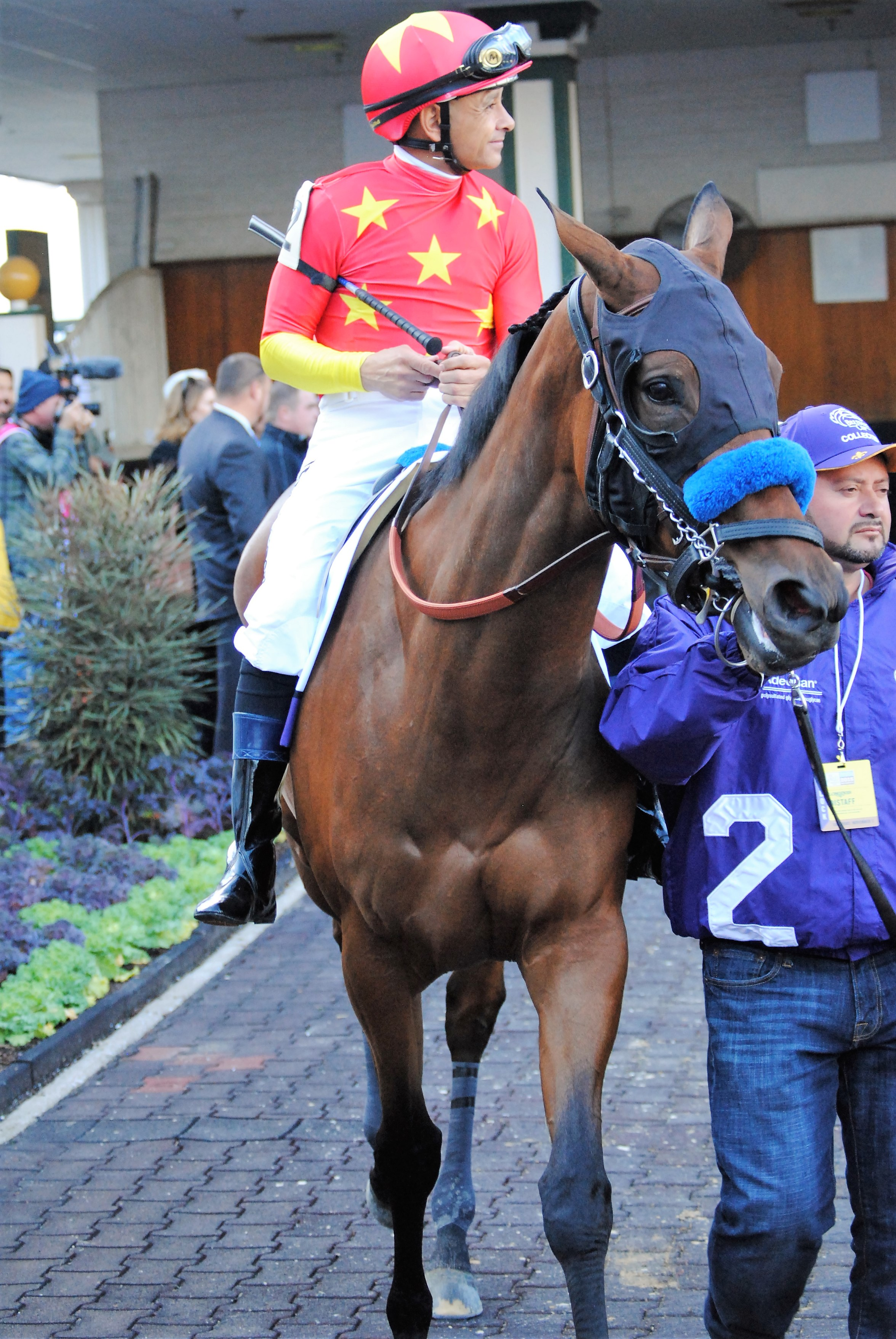
- Abel Tasman at the 2018 Breeders' Cup
- Sire: Quality Road
- Grandsire: Elusive Quality
- Dam: Vargas Girl
- Damsire: Deputy Minister
- Sex: Filly
- Foaled: March 12, 2014
- Country: United States
- Colour: Bay
- Breeder: Clearsky Farms
- Owner: Clearsky Farms (2016); China Horse Club and Clearsky Farms (2017-8)
- Trainer: 1) Simon Callaghan (2016–2017); 2) Bob Baffert (2017–18)
- Record: 16: 8-4-0
- Earnings: $2,793,385

Major wins
- Starlet Stakes (2016); Kentucky Oaks (2017); Acorn Stakes (2017); Coaching Club American Oaks (2017); Ogden Phipps Stakes (2018); Personal Ensign Stakes (2018)

Awards
- American Champion 3-Year-Old Filly (2017)
- Last updated on November 20, 2018

Abel Tasman (foaled March 12, 2014) is a retired American Thoroughbred racehorse. After finishing fifth in her first start at age two, she won her next three races including the Starlet Stakes. At age three, she finished second in both the Santa Ysabel and Santa Anita Oaks before winning the Grade I Kentucky Oaks, the female equivalent of the Kentucky Derby. She extended her winning streak by taking the Acorn Stakes and Coaching Club American Oaks, before finishing the year with second-place finishes in both the Cotillion Stakes and Breeders' Cup Distaff. She was named the American Champion Three-Year-Old Filly of 2017.

At age four, Abel Tasman finished fourth in her first start of the year in the La Troienne Stakes, then rebounded to win the Ogden Phipps and Personal Ensign. She finished her career with 8 wins from 16 starts and winnings of $2,793,385.

== Background ==
Abel Tasman was bred in Kentucky by Clearsky Farms, established in 2008 by Eamon Cleary and now owned by his sons, Bernard and Eamonn. A relatively small breeding operation with about 30 broodmares, Clearsky Farms was an Eclipse Award finalist for outstanding breeder of 2016 thanks to several noteworthy wins by horses they bred, including champion three-year-old Arrogate's victories in the Travers Stakes and Breeders' Cup Classic. Clearsky Farms purchased Abel Tasman's dam, Vargas Girl, in 2010 for $130,000. Vargas Girl died from complications while foaling Abel Tasman and the filly had to be resuscitated and then raised by a nurse mare.

Abel Tasman was sired by Quality Road, whose most important wins included the Florida Derby, Donn Handicap and Woodward Stakes. Quality Road was the leading first crop sire of 2014 and the leading third crop sire of 2016.

Abel Tasman was offered at the September 2015 Keeneland Sales but the final bid of $65,000 did not meet her reserve and she was bought back. She originally raced as a homebred for Clearsky Farms and was trained by Simon Callaghan. In January 2017, Clearsky sold a portion of the horse to China Horse Club, which was founded in 2010 by architect Teo Ah Khing. Following a second-place finishing in the Santa Ysabel Stakes, she was transferred to the barn of Bob Baffert.

Abel Tasman was a personal favorite of Baffert because of her gentle nature combined with a good mind. "I hope they breed her to American Pharoah," he said, referring to the Triple Crown winner he had also trained, "(but the foal) would probably be so nice, it wouldn't want to run."

== Racing career ==
=== 2016: two-year-old season ===
Abel Tasman made her first start on August 20, 2016, at Del Mar Racetrack, finishing fifth. She won her next start on September 30 at Santa Anita Park in a maiden special weight race, then won again in an allowance rate on November 18 at Del Mar.

For her final start of the year, Abel Tasman was entered for a supplementary fee of $10,000 in the Grade I Starlet Stakes at Santa Anita over a distance of 1 1/16 miles. She went off at odds of 13–1, while the odds-on favorite was the highly regarded American Gal. Abel Tasman got off to a slow start then started her move around the far turn while racing five wide. Nearing the finish line, she caught American Gal to win by a length. "I think the distance is the key for this filly", said Callaghan. "We decided to supplement because she was getting good at the right time and I thought she had the stamina for this race."

=== 2017: three-year-old season ===
Abel Tasman started her three-year-old campaign on March 4, 2017, in the Santa Ysabel Stakes at Santa Anita. Heavy favorite Unique Bella, considered one of the top fillies in training, went to the early lead and set comfortable fractions. Abel Tasman made a run down the stretch and closed to within a length before Unique Bella responded to her jockey's urging and drew away late to win by 2 1/2 lengths. "Turning for home, I had a lot of horse under me", said jockey Joe Talamo. "Hat's off to the winner. What a special filly she is, because... I really had a lot of horse and we had a beautiful trip."

Shortly after the race, it was announced that Abel Tasman would be moved from Callaghan's care to the barn of Bob Baffert. During the Santa Ysabel, Talamo had worn the silks of Clearsky Farms although he was supposed to have worn the colors of China Horse Club. According to Callaghan, China Horse Club did not accept his apology for the mix-up.

Her next start was the Santa Anita Oaks on April 8. Because of an injury to Unique Bella that kept her out of the race, Abel Tasman became the heavy favorite under new jockey Mike Smith. However, she again finished second after the lightly raced Paradise Woods got off to a large early lead and won by a record 11 3/4 lengths. "You know, (Paradise Woods) really just blew the field away", said Smith. "I made sure we got second. There was no catching the winner. And that was good enough for today. We’re going to have to go back to the drawing board, make a couple of changes, tweak this and tweak that a little, and see if we can turn the page in the Kentucky Oaks."

One of the changes that Baffert decided to make was adding blinkers. "They're little ones and they just keep her focused. She'll be competitive now, but it's a tough deal. There are some really good fillies in there. She needs to get away and not be so far back."

Abel Tasman was the fourth betting choice in the Kentucky Oaks, held on May 5 at Churchill Downs over a sloppy (sealed) track. Paradise Woods went to the early lead with Miss Sky Warrior, followed by Farrell in third place. The front runners, who were also the top betting choices, set rapid opening fractions, especially considering the track conditions. All three eventually tired and finished well back. Meanwhile, Abel Tasman broke poorly and was last in the field of fourteen as they headed into the first turn, though she had good position near the rail. In the final turn, Smith moved the filly six wide to get around traffic. She responded with a strong run to win by 1 1/4 lengths. "For as far back as I was, I knew they were going quick", said Smith. "Once I got her out in the middle of the track... I knew she was going to run well at that point."

After the race, part owner Teo Ah Khing said, "We hope that today's race, which is very significant, will put the geographical location and the significance of Kentucky Oaks in the mind of the Chinese, to understand the significance of this race. Asked about the change of trainers in March, the racing manager of China Horse Club stated, "We won't comment on it. Simon's a very good trainer and he trained her to a (Grade I) win. Bob's also a champion trainer and he's carried that on. We're thankful for both and everybody can just move on from this moment."

Abel Tasman made her next start at Belmont Park on June 10 in the Acorn Stakes, a one-turn mile. The 2-1 favorite, she raced in last place down the backstretch, then started to make up ground on the turn. Smith found an opening on the rail as they rounded into the stretch and Abel Tasman quickly took charge, then held off the challenge of Salty on the outside.

On July 23, Abel Tasman was entered in the Coaching Club American Oaks at Saratoga, run at a distance of 1 1/8 miles. She broke poorly and settled near the back of the field of seven, but was urged to the lead down the backstretch when the pace slowed. As they turned into the stretch, Salty mounted a brief challenge on the outside while Elate started closing ground on the rail. Smith guided Abel Tasman closer towards the rail, making it harder for Elate to go by. The two dueled for the final furlong with Abel Tasman prevailing by a head. The stewards mounted an inquiry about possible interference in the stretch run but allowed the results to stand. "It's just good, old-fashioned race riding", said Smith. "By no means did I put (Elate) in any harm. My filly really waits (for other horses to challenge her). Once she was in there, she was engaged. I made sure that I didn't touch (Elate). I made it tight, but there's no rules that say you can't make it tight."

Abel Tasman was then shipped to Parx Racing in Pennsylvania for the $1 million Cotillion Stakes on September 23. She broke slowly but then rushed up into second down the backstretch. She continued to duel with Lockdown for the lead as they entered the stretch, but meanwhile It Tiz Well mounted a strong move in the middle of the track and pulled ahead. Abel Tasman responded to the new challenge too late and finished second by two lengths. "She got real rank with (Smith), she took off with him it, and it was unfortunate", said Baffert. "It was a ridiculous run. We might have to take the blinkers off. I guess we just have to turn the page."

On November 3, Abel Tasman made her final start of the year in the Breeders' Cup Distaff, where she faced older horses for the first time. The favorite was Elate, who had won the Alabama and Beldame Stakes after finishing second to Abel Tasman in the Coaching Club American Oaks. The older horse division was led by champion Stellar Wind (Apple Blossom, Beholder Mile, Clement L. Hirsch) and Forever Unbridled (Fleur de Lis, Personal Ensign). Abel Tasman trailed the field for the first half mile, then swung wide around the final turn and started to close ground rapidly. However, Forever Unbridled had made an earlier move to hit the lead and was able to hold off Abel Tasman by half a length. "She ran her race", said Baffert. "She just got beat by a really good horse."

Abel Tasman was voted American Champion Three-Year-Old Filly for 2017.

=== 2018: four-year-old season ===
After the Breeders' Cup, Abel Tasman was turned out for a few weeks of rest. Baffert did not rush her return as he planned to focus her campaign on the second half of the season and another chance at the Breeders' Cup Distaff. She made her four-year-old debut in the La Troienne Stakes at Churchill Downs on May 4, 2018, a year after her biggest win in the Kentucky Oaks. She was the only Grade I winner in the race and went off as the odds-on favorite. However, she raced wide throughout the race and lacked her normal closing kick, finishing fourth behind Salty.

Abel Tasman made her next start in the Ogden Phipps Stakes on June 5 at Belmont Park, the same day Baffert would win the American Triple Crown with Justify. She stalked the early pace then moved to the lead on the backstretch when the pace slowed down. She maintained an easy lead around the turn then opened up down the stretch, eventually winning by 7 1/4 lengths. "I'm so proud of her", said Baffert. "She's one of my favorite all-time horses."

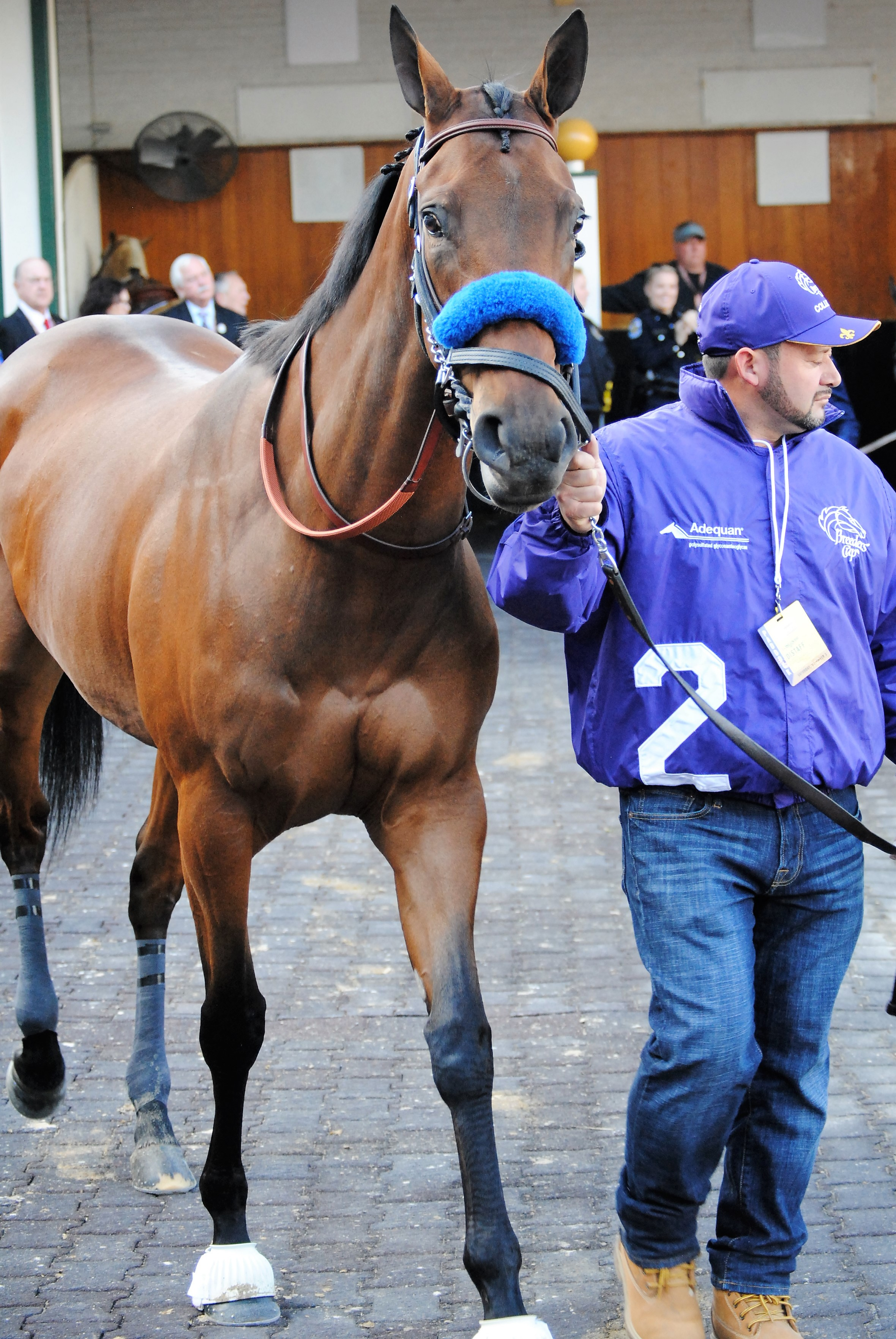
Abel Tasman at the 2018 Breeders' Cup

On August 25, Abel Tasman started in the Personal Ensign Stakes at Saratoga as the 3-5 favorite. Her main rival was Elate, the filly she had defeated the year before in the Coaching Club American Oaks after surviving a stewards' inquiry. After half a mile, Abel Tasman moved to the lead on a rail-hugging trip. Elate was racing behind her, then swung wide as they rounded the final turn. Elate started to close ground rapidly, getting to within half a length in mid stretch. Elate then started to drift out, then was guided back to her original path. Meanwhile, Abel Tasman moved away from the rail and the two fillies bumped. Elate lost her momentum and lost by a neck. Elate's jockey filed an objection but the steward's let the result stand.

The result proved controversial, with the crowd booing Abel Tasman and Smith in the winner's circle. Elate's jockey José Ortiz stated, "He (Smith) clearly came out, knocked my filly off balance, knocked me off balance and beat me by a neck. I think [Abel Tasman] should have come down, 100 percent." Smith disagreed, saying, "We just kind of came together, I didn't herd him [Ortiz] at all and she wasn't going to let him by no matter what."

Abel Tasman made her next start as the heavy favorite in the Zenyatta Stakes on September 30. She broke poorly and trailed the field early by ten lengths. Turning for home, she lacked her usual closing kick, finishing fifth. "I'm just really not sure what happened with her today", said Smith. "I'm kind of at a loss for words. The good thing is that she didn't get outrun. She didn't run period. For whatever reason she was lethargic loading and she was slow into stride and never wanted to pick it up."

On November 3, Abel Tasman was entered in the Breeders Cup Distaff, held in 2018 at Churchill Downs. Smith rode her aggressively from the gate and secured third place to the inside of Monomoy Girl going around the turn. She held her position down the backstretch but did not respond when Monomoy Girl started her drive, eventually finishing last. "She just quit running", said Baffert. "I thought she was in a good spot, (Smith) got aggressive with her, but she just doesn't want to run anymore, it looks like."

== Retirement ==
Abel Tasman was retired after the 2018 Breeders Cup. She was sold as a broodmare prospect at the Keeneland January 2019 Sales to Coolmore Stud for $5 million. She was subsequently bred to leading sire Galileo.

== Pedigree ==
Pedigree of Abel Tasman, bay filly, March 12, 2014
Sire Quality Road 2006	Elusive Quality; 1993	Gone West	Mr. Prospector
Sire Quality Road 2006	Elusive Quality; 1993	Gone West	Secrettame
Sire Quality Road 2006	Elusive Quality; 1993	Touch of Greatness	Hero's Honor
Sire Quality Road 2006	Elusive Quality; 1993	Touch of Greatness	Ivory Wand
Sire Quality Road 2006	Kobla; 1995	Strawberry Road (AUS)	Whiskey Road
Sire Quality Road 2006	Kobla; 1995	Strawberry Road (AUS)	Giftisa (NZ)
Sire Quality Road 2006	Kobla; 1995	Winglet	Alydar
Sire Quality Road 2006	Kobla; 1995	Winglet	Highest Trump
Dam Vargas Girl 2003	Deputy Minister; 1979	Vice Regent	Northern Dancer
Dam Vargas Girl 2003	Deputy Minister; 1979	Vice Regent	Victoria Regina
Dam Vargas Girl 2003	Deputy Minister; 1979	Mint Copy	Bunty's Flight
Dam Vargas Girl 2003	Deputy Minister; 1979	Mint Copy	Shakney
Dam Vargas Girl 2003	Wheatly Way; 1989	Wheatly Hall	Norcliffe
Dam Vargas Girl 2003	Wheatly Way; 1989	Wheatly Hall	La Bonzo
Dam Vargas Girl 2003	Wheatly Way; 1989	Family Way	Cyane
Dam Vargas Girl 2003	Wheatly Way; 1989	Family Way	Family Line (family: 1-a)

Abel Tasman is inbred 5S x 4D to Northern Dancer, meaning Northern Dancer appears in the fifth generation of the sire's side of the pedigree and in the fourth generation of the dam's side.
