= 2014 Breeders' Cup Classic =

Thoroughbred horse race

31st Breeders' Cup Classic
- Breeders' Cup Classic
- Location: Santa Anita
- Date: November 1, 2014
- Winning horse: Bayern
- Jockey: Martin Garcia
- Trainer: Bob Baffert
- Owner: Kaleem Shah
- Conditions: fast
- Surface: Dirt
- Attendance: 61,114

The 2014 Breeders' Cup Classic was the 31st running of the Breeders' Cup Classic, part of the 2014 Breeders' Cup World Thoroughbred Championships program. It was run on November 1, 2014, at Santa Anita race track in Arcadia, California.

In a controversial result, Bayern, who led every step of the race, survived a 10-minute stewards' inquiry into the start of the race and was left the winner. Bayern had crossed in front of several horses at the break, causing serious bumping to occur. The stewards agreed that interference had occurred but did not feel that they could determine if this affected the result of the race.

The Classic was run on dirt at one mile and one-quarter (approximately 2000 m) with a purse of $5,000,000. It was run under weight-for-age conditions, with entrants carrying the following weights:

- Northern Hemisphere three-year-olds: 122 lb
- Southern Hemisphere three-year-olds: 117 lb
- Four-year-olds and up: 126 lb
- Fillies and mares receive an allowance of 3 lb

== Contenders ==
There was a full field of fourteen for the Classic, led by four horses who were considered Horse of the Year contenders: Shared Belief, California Chrome, Tonalist and Bayern. Unusually, all four favorites were three-year-olds – the older horse division had been depleted by the retirement of horses such as Mucho Macho Man and Game On Dude.

Shared Belief was the pre-race favorite, coming into the race undefeated. He had missed the Triple Crown races in the spring due to injury, but recovered to beat older horses in both the Pacific Classic and Awesome Again.

California Chrome was the second choice at 4-1 on the morning line, based on his dominant wins in the Santa Anita Derby, Kentucky Derby and Preakness Stakes. However, California Chrome had injured himself when finishing fourth in the Belmont Stakes and finished sixth in his return in the Pennsylvania Derby.

Bayern, known for his front-running style, was one of the most difficult entries for the bettors to assess. He had several impressive wins during the year, including the Haskell Invitational and Pennsylvania Derby, beating California Chrome in the latter. However, he had also lost badly to California Chrome in the Preakness and V.E. Day in the Travers in races where he was challenged for the early lead. His "one-dimensional" style made him vulnerable, especially if longshot Moreno went to the lead with him as expected.

The other leading contenders were:

- Tonalist, who beat California Chrome in the Belmont Stakes in June and then beat older horses in the Jockey Club Gold Cup in September
- V.E. Day, winner of the Travers
- Toast of New York, a synthetic dirt specialist from England, who won the UAE Derby in March and was second to Shared Belief in the Pacific Classic
- Cigar Street, winner of the Homecoming Stakes
- Zivo, winner of the Suburban and second in the Jockey Club Gold Cup
- Moreno, front-running winner of the Whitney and second in both the Suburban and Woodward

== Race description ==
Bayern broke rapidly from the gate and "took a hard left turn" toward the rail, bumping Shared Belief in the process. Knocked off stride, Shared Belief in turn stumbled into Moreno, who had been expected to challenge Bayern for the early lead. Moreno lost his footing and never challenged. Bayern got good position on the rail and an uncontested lead while setting a fast pace.

For most of the race, Bayern was followed by Toast of New York, who had also bumped into both Shared Belief and Moreno while moving into position. California Chrome was not involved in the contact, racing on the outside a few lengths behind in third. He started to close as they entered the stretch but could not get by: Bayern won by a nose over Toast of New York with California Chrome a neck back. Shared Belief closed ground late to finish fourth.

After a 10-minute inquiry, the stewards decided to let the results stand, explaining later that the rules in California made the decision subjective, requiring them to determine if the foul affected the result of the race. "We all agreed there was interference, no question, Bayern broke in. Three or four horses suffered interference," said steward Scott Chaney. "Did it change the outcome? Any interference could. At the start of a mile-and-a-quarter race we're really loathe to make a change. You really don't want us handicapping the race." Many still disagreed with the decision, especially given the impact on the expected pace scenario. Shared Belief's part-owner, Jim Rome said, "The message is pretty much that you can commit a foul at the beginning of a race. But that can be extremely dangerous to horse and jockey." The controversy overshadowed the performances of the top finishers, who ran the 1 1/4-mile race in 1:59.88.

== Results ==
Finish	Program Number	Margin (lengths)	Horse	Jockey	Trainer	Final Odds	Winnings
1st	7	Nose	Bayern	Martin Garcia	Bob Baffert	6.10	2,750,000
2nd	9	Neck	Toast of New York	Jamie Spencer	Jamie Osborne	18.40	900,000
3rd	13	3 1/2	California Chrome	Victor Espinoza	Art Sherman	4.40	500,000
4th	6	1 1/4	Shared Belief	Mike Smith	Jerry Hollendorfer	2.50	300,000
5th	11	1/2	Tonalist	Joel Rosario	Christophe Clement	4.40	100,000
6th	12	3 1/2	Candy Boy	Corey Nakatani	John Sadler	20.30	
7th	2	1 1/2	Cigar Street	John Velazquez	William Mott	11.60	
8th	8	Neck	Zivo	Jose Lezcano	Chad Brown	11.40	
9th	3	Head	Imperative	Lanfranco Dettori	George Papaprodronnou	66.10	
10th	10	Head	Footbridge	Rafael Bejarano	Eoin Harty	69.70	
11th	5	Nose	V. E. Day	Joseph Talamo	James Jerkens	25.70	
12th	1	3 1/2	Prayer for Relief	Irad Ortiz Jr.	Dale Romans	54.90	
13th	14	22 1/4	Majestic Harbor	Tyler Baze	Sean McCarthy	45.60	
14th	4		Moreno	Javier Castellano	Eric Guillot	26.10	

Source: Equibase

Times: 1/4 – 0:23.12; 1/2 – 0:46.44; 3/4 – 1:10.22; mile – 1:34.16; final – 1:59.98.
Fractional Splits: (:23.12) (:23.32) (:23.78) (:23.94) (:25.72)

== Payout ==
Payout Schedule:

Program Number	Horse	Win	Place	Show
7	Bayern	14.20	8.00	5.20
9	Toast of New York		18.00	10.80
13	California Chrome			5.40

- $2 Exacta (7-9) Paid $249.80
- $2 Trifecta (7-9-13) Paid $2,087.20
- $2 Superfecta (7-9-13-6) Paid $7,634.80
