= Quality Road =

American-bred Thoroughbred racehorse

- Sire: Elusive Quality
- Grandsire: Gone West
- Dam: Kobla
- Damsire: Strawberry Road
- Sex: Stallion
- Foaled: 2006
- Country: United States
- Colour: Bay
- Breeder: Edward P. Evans
- Owner: Edward P. Evans
- Trainer: 1) James A. Jerkens; 2) Todd A. Pletcher
- Record: 13: 8-3-1
- Earnings: US$2,232,830

Major wins
- Fountain of Youth Stakes (2009); Florida Derby (2009); Amsterdam Stakes (2009); Hal's Hope Stakes (2010); Donn Handicap (2010); Metropolitan Handicap (2010); Woodward Stakes (2010)

Quality Road (foaled March 23, 2006, in Virginia) is a retired American Thoroughbred racehorse and successful sire.

== Background ==
Quality Road was bred and owned by Edward P. Evans. He was sired by Elusive Quality, who also sired 2004 Kentucky Derby/Preakness Stakes winner Smarty Jones and 2008 Breeders' Cup Classic winner Raven's Pass. His dam is Kobla, a daughter of 1983 Australian Champion Racehorse of the Year Strawberry Road.

At maturity, he reached 16.3 hands (67 inches, 170 cm) high.

== Racing career ==
=== 2009: three-year-old season ===
Trained by Jimmy Jerkens, Quality Road raced in Florida in early 2009, where his wins in the Fountain of Youth Stakes and Grade 1 Florida Derby made him a favorite for the Kentucky Derby. However, he suffered two injuries. The first was a quarter crack on his right hind foot the day he won the Florida Derby. In April, he suffered a second quarter crack on his right front foot. As a result, he missed all three legs of the U.S. Triple Crown series.

In mid June, owner Edward Evans transferred the colt to the care of trainer Todd Pletcher. On August 3, 2009, Quality Road made his first start since his injury, winning the Amsterdam Stakes at Saratoga Race Course in a track record time of 1:13.74 for six and a half furlongs.

On August 29, 2009, Quality Road finished third to Summer Bird in the Travers Stakes. He followed that with a second to Summer Bird in the October 10 Jockey Gold Cup. Later that month, Quality Road was pre-entered in the Breeders' Cup Classic, in the hopes that his running style would be well-suited to the polytrack at Santa Anita Park.

On November 7, 2009, Quality Road became the first horse to scratch at the gate in the Breeders' Cup Classic. After he refused to load into the starting gate, kicking with his hind legs on two or three occasions, the track crew blindfolded him and he kicked wildly, scraping his hocks on the gate and forcing the scratch.

=== 2010: four-year-old season ===
On January 3, Quality Road made his 4-year-old debut in the Grade III Hal's Hope Stakes as the odds-on favorite. He won by 2 3/4 lengths.

On February 6, he broke his own track record when he won the Donn Handicap with John Velazquez riding. Quality Road finished the race in 1:47.49 to break the record of 1:47.72, which he set when he won the 2009 Florida Derby. He took control of the race at the stretch and began to pull away at the eighth pole. Dry Martini, the 2009 Suburban Handicap winner, was second.

In an interview with the Thoroughbred Times after the race, Pletcher said he would point the colt for the Metropolitan Handicap and the "big races" at Saratoga Race Course "before the Breeders' Cup Classic" in fall 2010. He also complimented Quality Road's performance, saying, “He’s got a very high cruising speed and can go :46 and 1:09 and still keep going. Not many horses can do that and he was spotting weight to all those horses, six pounds or more.

Quality Road earned a 121 Beyer Speed Figure in the Donn Handicap, then the highest speed figure awarded for a race over one mile since 2005.

In the May 31 Metropolitan Handicap, Quality Road was installed as favorite and held off Musket Man to win in a very fast time of 1:33.11. On August 7, 2010, he ran 2nd in the Whitney Handicap, beaten a head by eventual Breeders' Cup Classic winner Blame. On September 4, 2010, he won the Woodward Stakes by 4 3/4 lengths.

Quality Road ran only once more. On November 6, 2010, he started in the Breeders' Cup Classic at Churchill Downs. Breaking from the 1 post, he remained on the rail throughout the race and finished 12th and last behind Blame. After the race, it was determined that the horse had an abscess and that was the reason he was pulled up.

== Stud record ==
Quality Road was then retired to Lane's End Farm in Versailles, Kentucky. His stud fee for 2011 was $35,000. His first crop raced in 2014, most notable runners were 2014 Breeders' Cup Juvenile Turf winner Hootenanny, multiple graded stakes winner Blofeld, and stakes winner Overprepared. He was the leading first crop sire by earnings in 2014.

He was not as successful with his second crop that started racing in 2015, but in 2016 he rebounded by leading the third crop sire list. His outstanding runner of 2016 was Abel Tasman, who went on to win the 2017 Kentucky Oaks.

Quality Road's top progeny includes

=== Notable progeny ===
c = colt, f = filly, g = gelding

Foaled	Name	Sex	Major wins
2012	Hootenanny	c	Breeders' Cup Juvenile Turf (2014)
2012	Illuminant	f	Gamely Stakes (2016 )
2012	Spring Quality	g	Manhattan Handicap (2018)
2014	Abel Tasman	f	Starlet Stakes (2016), 2017 Kentucky Oaks (2017), Coaching Club American Oaks (2017), Acorn Stakes (2017), Ogden Phipps Stakes (2018) and Personal Ensign Stakes (2018)
2014	Klimt	c	Del Mar Futurity (2016)
2014	City of Light	c	Malibu Stakes (2017), Breeders' Cup Dirt Mile (2018), Triple Bend Handicap (2018), Pegasus World Cup (2019)
2014	Salty	f	La Troienne Stakes (2018)
2015	Caledonia Road	f	Breeders' Cup Juvenile Fillies (2017)
2016	Bellafina	f	Del Mar Debutante Stakes (2018), Chandelier Stakes (2018), Santa Anita Oaks (2019)
2016	Dunbar Road	f	Alabama Stakes (2019)
2016	Roadster	c	Santa Anita Derby (2019)
2018	Bleecker Street	f	New York Stakes (2022)
2019	Corniche	c	Breeders' Cup Juvenile (2021), American Pharoah Stakes (2021)
2020	National Treasure	c	Preakness Stakes (2023), Pegasus World Cup (2024), Metropolitan Handicap (2024)

== Racing record ==
Finish	Race	Distance	Jockey	Time	Grade	Runner up/Winner	Track
12th	Breeders' Cup Classic	1 1/4 mi	John Velazquez	2:02.28	I	Blame (1st)	Churchill Downs
1st	Woodward Stakes	1 1/8 mi	John Velazquez	1:50.00	I	Mythical Power	Saratoga Race Track
2nd	Whitney Handicap	1 1/8 mi	John Velazquez	1:48.88	I	Blame (1st)	Saratoga Race Track
1st	Metropolitan Handicap	1 mi	John Velazquez	1:33.11	I	Musket Man	Belmont Park
1st	Donn Handicap	1 1/8 mi	John Velazquez	1:47.49	I	Dry Martini	Gulfstream Park
1st	Hal's Hope Handicap	1 mi	John Velazquez	1:36.33	III	You and I Forever	Gulfstream Park
2nd	Jockey Club Gold Cup	1 1/4 mi	John Velazquez	2:02.51	I	Summer Bird (1st)	Belmont Park
3rd	Travers Stakes	1 1/4 mi	John Velazquez	2:02.83	I	Summer Bird (1st)	Saratoga Race Track
1st	Amsterdam Stakes	6 1/2 fur	John Velazquez	1:13.45	II	Capt. Candyman Can	Saratoga Race Track
1st	Florida Derby	1 1/8 mi	John Velazquez	1:47.41	I	Dunkirk	Gulfstream Park
1st	Fountain of Youth Stakes	1 mi	John Velazquez	1:35.01	II	Theregoesjojo	Gulfstream Park
2nd	Allowance	7 fur	Alan Garcia	1:22.23	None	Theregoesjojo (1st)	Gulfstream Park
1st	Maiden	6 1/2 fur	Alan Garcia	1:16.11	None	Toulouse Lautec	Aqueduct Race Track

== Pedigree ==
Pedigree of Quality Road
Sire Elusive Quality	Gone West	Mr. Prospector	Raise a Native
Sire Elusive Quality	Gone West	Mr. Prospector	Gold Digger
Sire Elusive Quality	Gone West	Secrettame	Secretariat
Sire Elusive Quality	Gone West	Secrettame	Tamerett
Sire Elusive Quality	Touch of Greatness	Hero's Honor	Northern Dancer
Sire Elusive Quality	Touch of Greatness	Hero's Honor	Glowing Tribute
Sire Elusive Quality	Touch of Greatness	Ivory Wand	Sir Ivor
Sire Elusive Quality	Touch of Greatness	Ivory Wand	Natashka
Dam Kobla	Strawberry Road	Whiskey Road	Nijinsky
Dam Kobla	Strawberry Road	Whiskey Road	Bowl of Flowers
Dam Kobla	Strawberry Road	Giftisa	Rich Gift
Dam Kobla	Strawberry Road	Giftisa	Wahkeena
Dam Kobla	Winglet	Alydar	Raise a Native
Dam Kobla	Winglet	Alydar	Sweet Tooth
Dam Kobla	Winglet	Highest Trump	Bold Bidder
Dam Kobla	Winglet	Highest Trump	Dear April
