= Belgrave Stakes =

Flat horse race in Ireland

Belgrave Stakes
2026
Big Gossey	Tango Flare	Bodhi Bear

Previous years
2025
Vespertilio	My Mate Alfie	King Cuan
2024
My Mate Alfie	Ano Syra	Tango Flare
2023
Commanche Falls	Anthem National	Mooneista
2022
Teresa Mendoza	Prisoner's Dilemma	Power Under Me
2021
Romantic Proposal	Teresa Mendoza	Quarantine Dreams

2020-2011
2020
Harry's Bar	Laugh A Minute	Inflection Point
2019
Speak In Colours	Woody Creek	Chessman
2018
Fleet Review	Intelligence Cross	Ardhoomey
2017
Only Mine	Gordon Lord Byron	Peticoatgovernment
2016
Toscanini	Flight Risk	Jamesie
2015
Gordon Lord Byron	Balmont Mast	Line Of Reason
2014
Darwin	Russian Soul	Jamesie
2013
Sea Siren	Russian Soul	Boston Rocker
2012
Slade Power	Arctic	Santo Padre
2011
Rose Bonheur	Katla	Rock Jock

2010-2001
2010
Croisultan	Rock Jock	Snaefell
2009
Aine	Snaefell	Georgebernardshaw
2008
Dimenticata	Sharleez	Elletelle
2007
Haatef	Moone Cross	Majestic Times
2006
Osterhase	Borderlescott	That's Hot
2005
Moon Unit	Dark Cheetah	Kay Two
2004
Ulfah	Desert Fantasy	Grand Reward
2003
Desert Fantasy	Mombassa	Danaskaya
2002
Osterhase	One Won One	Carallia
2001
Ishiguru	D'Anjou	One Won One

2000-1991
2000
Social Harmony	One Won One	Galloway Boy
1999
Oyster Catcher	Rolo Tomasi	Rubies From Burma
1998
Tadeo	Dane River	Symboli Kildare
1997
Poker-B	Best Before Dawn	Sweet Mazarine
1996
Ailleacht	Ger's Royale	America's Cup
1995
Petite Fantasy	Wild Bluebell	Beating The Buzz
1994
Diligent Dodger	High Tycoon	Ciseaux
1993
Tropical	Persian Creek	Dashing Colours
1992
Poolesta	Persian Creek	Cheviot Amble
1991
Additional Risk	Approach The Bench	Anne De Beaujeu

The Belgrave Stakes is a Listed flat horse race in Ireland open to horses aged three years or older. It is run at the Curragh over a distance of 6 furlongs (1,206 metres), and it is scheduled to take place each year in June.

The race was first run in 1991. It took place at Leopardstown until 1997 and at Fairyhouse from 1998 to 2000 and from 2006 to 2014.

== Records ==
Most successful horse (2 wins):

- Osterhase - (2002, 2006)

Leading jockey (5 wins):

- Michael Kinane – Additional Risk (1991), Tropical (1993), Oyster Catcher (1999), Ishiguru (2001), Moon Unit (2005)

Leading trainer (6 wins):

- Aidan O'Brien – Petite Fantasy (1995), Oyster Catcher (1999), Ishiguru (2001), Sea Siren (2013), Darwin (2014), Fleet Review (2018)

== Winners ==
Year	Winner	Age	Jockey	Trainer	Time
1991	Additional Risk	3	Michael Kinane	Dermot Weld	1:26.30
1992	Poolesta	3	W J O'Connor	John Oxx	1:11.70
1993	Tropical	3	Michael Kinane	Dermot Weld	1:13.50
1994	Diligent Dodger	3	Willie Supple	Kevin Prendergast	1:13.70
1995	Petite Fantasy	3	Christy Roche	Aidan O'Brien	1:18.30
1996	Ailleacht	4	Kevin Manning	Jim Bolger	1:15.20
1997	Poker-B	3	Johnny Murtagh	Declan Gillespie	1:13.70
1998	Tadeo	5	Dean McKeown	Mark Johnston	1:09.90
1999	Oyster Catcher	3	Michael Kinane	Aidan O'Brien
2000	Social Harmony	6	Pat Smullen	Dermot Weld	1:11.70
2001	Ishiguru	3	Michael Kinane	Aidan O'Brien	1:14.00
2002	Osterhase	3	Dane O'Neill	John Mulhern	1:12.10
2003	Desert Fantasy	4	Tom Queally	Christy Roche	1:10.60
2004	Ulfah	3	Declan McDonogh	Kevin Prendergast	1:11.60
2005	Moon Unit	4	Michael Kinane	Harry Rogers	1:11.50
2006	Osterhase	7	Fran Berry	John Mulhern	1:12.00
2007	Haatef	3	Declan McDonogh	Kevin Prendergast	1:18.63
2008	Dimenticata	4	Chris Hayes	Kevin Prendergast	1:13.66
2009	Aine	4	Wayne Lordan	Tommy Stack	1:18.29
2010	Croisultan	4	Ben Curtis	Liam McAteer	1:13.21
2011	Rose Bonheur	3	Declan McDonogh	Kevin Prendergast	1:12.60
2012	Slade Power	3	Wayne Lordan	Edward Lynam	1:16.86
2013	Sea Siren	5	Joseph O'Brien	Aidan O'Brien	1:13.63
2014	Darwin	4	Joseph O'Brien	Aidan O'Brien	1:14.60
2015	Gordon Lord Byron	7	Wayne Lordan	Tom Hogan	1:11.47
2016	Toscanini	4	Shane Foley	Michael Halford	1:12.15
2017	Only Mine	4	Gary Carroll	Joseph G. Murphy	1:12.41
2018	Fleet Review	3	Ryan Moore	Aidan O'Brien	1:11.53
2019	Speak In Colours	4	Donnacha O'Brien	Joseph Patrick O'Brien	1:12.07
2020	Harry's Bar (Note: The 2020 race was run at Dundalk in November due to the COVID-19 pandemic in the Republic of Ireland)	5	Wayne Lordan	Adrian McGuinness	1:10.99
2021	Romantic Proposal	5	Chris Hayes	Edward Lynam	1:12.20
2022	Teresa Mendoza	4	Billy Lee	Ken Condon	1:13.27
2023	Commanche Falls	6	Conor Beasley	Michael Dods	1:10.10
2024	My Mate Alfie	3	Colin Keane	Ger Lyons	1:12.74
2025	Vespertilio	4	Dylan Browne McMonagle	Willie McCreery	1:12.76
2026	Big Gossey	9	Billy Lee	Charles O'Brien	1:11.28

== See also ==
- Horse racing in Ireland
- List of Irish flat horse races
