= Woodlands Stakes =

Flat horse race in Ireland

- Class: Listed
- Location: Naas Racecourse; County Kildare, Ireland
- Inaugurated: 2003
- Race type: Flat / Thoroughbred
- Sponsor: Anglesey Lodge Equine Hospital
- Website: Naas

Race information
- Distance: 5f (1,006 metres)
- Surface: Turf
- Track: Straight
- Qualification: Three-years-old and up
- Weight: 8 st 13 lb (3yo); 9 st 9 lb (4yo+); Allowances; 5 lb for fillies and mares Penalties; 5 lb for Group 1 or Group 2 winners * 3 lb for Group 3 or Listed winners * * since 1 May last year
- Purse: €45,000 (2025); 1st: €26,550

Woodlands Stakes
2026
Mission Central	Likedbymike	Getreadytorumble

Previous years
2025
Two Stars	My Mate Alfie	Unexpected Issues
2024
Moss Tucker	Ocean Quest	Go Athletico
2023
Moss Tucker	Tenebrism	Coachello
2022
Romantic Proposal	Geocentric	Mooneista
2021
Mooneista	Harry's Bar	Back To Brussels

2020-2011
2020
Sceptical	Southern Horse	Buffer Zone
2019
Urban Beat	Soffia	Primo Uomo
2018
Primo Uomo	Gorane	Washington Dc
2017
Washington DC	Ardhoomey	Primo Uomo
2016
Fort Del Oro	Monsieur Joe	Abstraction
2015
Great Minds	Musical Comedy	Maarek
2014
Guerre	Maarek	Nocturnal Affair
2013
Maarek	Scream Blue Murder	Red Dubawi
2012
Santo Padre	Spirit Quartz	Katla
2011
Inxile	Knock Stars	Lui Rei

2010-2003
2010
Velvet Flicker	Luisant	Snaefell
2009
Inxile	Reverence	Le Cadre Noir
2008
Snaefell	Tax Free	Reverence
2007
Dandy Man	Flash McGahon	Absolutelyfabulous
2006
Moon Unit	Dandy Man	Kingsdale Ocean
2004
Abunawwas	Millybaa	Moon Unit
2003
Miss Emma	One Won One	Bon Expresso

The Woodlands Stakes is a Listed flat horse race in Ireland open to thoroughbreds aged three years or older. It is run at Naas over a distance of 5 furlongs (1,006 metres), and it is scheduled to take place each year in April.

The race was first run in 2003.

== Records ==
Most successful horse (2 wins):

- Inxile - (2009, 2011)
- Moss Tucker - (2023, 2024)

Leading jockey (3 wins):

- Billy Lee - Fort Del Oro (2016), Moss Tucker (2023,2024)

Leading trainer (3 wins):

- Aidan O'Brien – Guerre (2014), Washington DC (2017), Mission Central (2026)

== Winners ==
Year	Winner	Age	Jockey	Trainer	Time
2003	Miss Emma	3	Tadg O'Shea	Michael Halford	1:13.30
2004	Abunawwas	4	Declan McDonogh	Kevin Prendergast	1:12.20
2006	Moon Unit	5	Willie Supple	Harry Rogers	1:00.50
2007	Dandy Man	4	Pat Shanahan	Tracey Collins	0:59.00
2008	Snaefell	4	Johnny Murtagh	Michael Halford	1:02.01
2009	Inxile	4	Adrian Nicholls	David Nicholls	1:00.00
2010	Velvet Flicker	3	Chris Hayes	Kevin Prendergast	1:00.95
2011	Inxile	6	Fran Berry	David Nicholls	1:00.53
2012	Santo Padre	8	Feargal Lynch	David Marnane	1:01.53
2013	Maarek	6	Seamie Heffernan	David Peter Nagle	1:05.34
2014	Guerre	3	Joseph O'Brien	Aidan O'Brien	0:57.84
2015	Great Minds	5	Wayne Lordan	Tommy Stack	1:02.19
2016	Fort Del Oro	4	Billy Lee	Edward Lynam	0:57.94
2017	Washington DC (Note: The 2017 and 2018 races took place at Navan as part of changes due to redevelopment work at The Curragh.)	4	Seamie Heffernan	Aidan O'Brien	1:00.18
2018	Primo Uomo	6	Niall McCullagh	Gerard O'Leary	1:02.29
2019	Urban Beat	4	Shane Foley	Johnny Murtagh	1:00.46
2020	Sceptical (Note: The 2020 running was closed to three-year-olds and took place in June over 5½ furlongs due to the COVID-19 pandemic in the Republic of Ireland)	4	Jody Sheridan	Denis Gerard Hogan	1:03.81
2021	Mooneista	3	Wayne Lordan	Jack Davison	1:00.13
2022	Romantic Proposal	6	Chris Hayes	Edward Lynam	0:59.39
2023	Moss Tucker	5	Billy Lee	Ken Condon	1:03.99
2024	Moss Tucker	6	Billy Lee	Ken Condon	1:03.02
2025	Two Stars	5	Joey Sheridan	Fozzy Stack	1:00.63
2026	Mission Central	3	Ryan Moore	Aidan O'Brien	0:57.69

== See also ==
- Horse racing in Ireland
- List of Irish flat horse races

== Bibliography ==
- Racing Post:
  - 2003, 2004, 2006, 2007, 2008, 2009, 2010, 2011, 2012, 2013
  - 2014, 2015, 2016, 2017, 2018, 2019, 2020, 2021, 2022, 2023
  - 2025
