= Raven's Pass =

American-bred Thoroughbred racehorse

- Racing silks of Princess Haya of Jordan
- Sire: Elusive Quality (USA)
- Grandsire: Gone West
- Dam: Ascutney (USA)
- Damsire: Lord At War (ARG)
- Sex: Stallion
- Foaled: 2005
- Country: United States
- Colour: Chestnut
- Breeder: Stonerside Stable
- Owner: Princess Haya Bint Al Hussein & Darley Racing
- Trainer: John Gosden
- Record: 12: 6–4–1
- Earnings: US$3,658,556 (equivalent)

Major wins
- Winkfield Stakes (2007); Solario Stakes (2007); Celebration Mile (2008); Queen Elizabeth II Stakes (2008); Breeders' Cup Classic (2008)

Raven's Pass (foaled February 17, 2005 in Kentucky) is an American-bred, British-trained Thoroughbred racehorse most notable for being the first English-trained winner of the Grade I Breeders' Cup Classic at Santa Anita Park in Arcadia, California.

== Background ==
Raven's Pass was sired by Elusive Quality, who also sired 2004 Kentucky Derby and Preakness Stakes winner Smarty Jones. His dam, Ascutney, was by Lord At War, making him a half-brother to Miami Mile Handicap winner Gigawatt. He was bred and raced by Stonerside Stable of Paris, Kentucky, until the farm and its bloodstock were sold in September 2008 to Princess Haya Bint Al Hussein, daughter of King Hussein I of Jordan and a wife of Mohammed bin Rashid Al Maktoum, who owns Darley Racing, owner of the other half-interest in the horse.

Raven's Pass was trained at Newmarket, Suffolk by John Gosden and ridden in all but two of his races by Jimmy Fortune.

== Racing career ==
=== 2007: two-year-old season ===
Raven's Pass began his career as an unconsidered outsider in a maiden race at Yarmouth in July, which he won at odds of 20–1, ridden by David Kinsella. Later in the same month, he scored a five-length victory over better opposition in the Listed Winkfield Stakes at Ascot. His progress continued when he stepped up to group race level for the first time and won the Group 3 Solario Stakes at Sandown by seven lengths. In his final start as a two-year-old, he was sent off as second favourite for the Group One Dewhurst Stakes at Newmarket and finished behind juvenile champion New Approach.

=== 2008: three-year-old season ===
The first half of Raven's Pass's three-year-old career was marked by a run of notable performances, narrow defeats, and the establishment of a long-running series of encounters with the Irish colt Henrythenavigator. In April, he was prepared up for the first Classic by running a short-head second to the top-class Twice Over in the Group III Craven Stakes at Newmarket. Three weeks later, he returned to Newmarket for the Group I 2,000 Guineas. In a strong field, he ran fourth, four and a half lengths behind Henrythenavigator.

The pair met again in the Group One St James's Palace Stakes at Royal Ascot in June. Henrythenavigator prevailed again, but the margin was reduced to three quarters of a length. After a trip to France, in which Raven's Pass finished runner-up to Tamayuz in the Group One Prix Jean Prat, he lined up against Henrythenavigator for the third time in the Group I Sussex Stakes at Goodwood in July. The result was the same as before, but this time the margin of victory was a head.

In August, Raven's Pass was dropped down a level and gained his first win of the year in the Group II Celebration Mile at Goodwood before a fourth clash with Henrythenavigator in the Group I Queen Elizabeth II Stakes at Ascot. Raven's Pass got the better of his rival for the first time and registered his biggest win in Europe.

The final meeting between Raven's Pass and Henrythenavigator came a month later in the 2008 Breeders' Cup Classic at Santa Anita. In this race, Fortune was replaced as the colt's jockey by Frankie Dettori. American Champion Curlin took the lead early in the straight but was passed by the two European colts, with Raven's Pass claiming the victory to become the first English-trained winner of the Classic.

== Assessment ==
The International Federation of Horseracing Authorities ranked Raven's Pass as the third best Thoroughbred racehorse of 2008, one pound behind joint leaders Curlin and New Approach.

Raven's Pass was a finalist for the Eclipse Award's American Champion Three-Year-Old Male Horse for 2008.

== Stud record ==
Raven's Pass was retired to stand as a stallion at the Kildangan Stud, as part of the Darley Stud organisation. In April 2010, he underwent surgery for colic, causing him to miss six weeks of the breeding season. Raven's Pass had his first Stakes winner on 29 September 2012 when Steeler won the Royal Lodge Stakes.

Raven's Pass sired his first Group 1 winner in 2018 when Royal Marine won the Prix Jean-Luc Lagardère.

=== Notable progeny ===
Raven's Pass has sired four individual Group 1 winners.

c = colt, f = filly, g = gelding

Foaled	Name	Sex	Major wins
2015	Matterhorn	c	Al Maktoum Challenge, Round 3
2015	Tower Of London	c	Sprinters Stakes
2016	Royal Marine	g	Prix Jean-Luc Lagardère
2016	Romantic Proposal	f	Flying Five Stakes

== Pedigree ==
Pedigree of Raven's Pass (USA), chestnut stallion, 2005
Sire Elusive Quality (USA) 1993	Gone West; 1984	Mr. Prospector	Raise a Native
Sire Elusive Quality (USA) 1993	Gone West; 1984	Mr. Prospector	Gold Digger
Sire Elusive Quality (USA) 1993	Gone West; 1984	Secrettame	Secretariat
Sire Elusive Quality (USA) 1993	Gone West; 1984	Secrettame	Tamerett
Sire Elusive Quality (USA) 1993	Touch of Greatness; 1986	Heros Honor	Northern Dancer
Sire Elusive Quality (USA) 1993	Touch of Greatness; 1986	Heros Honor	Glowing Tribute
Sire Elusive Quality (USA) 1993	Touch of Greatness; 1986	Ivory Wand	Sir Ivor
Sire Elusive Quality (USA) 1993	Touch of Greatness; 1986	Ivory Wand	Natashka
Dam Ascutney (USA) 1994	Lord at War; 1980	General	Brigadier Gerard
Dam Ascutney (USA) 1994	Lord at War; 1980	General	Mercuriale
Dam Ascutney (USA) 1994	Lord at War; 1980	Luna de Miel	Con Brio
Dam Ascutney (USA) 1994	Lord at War; 1980	Luna de Miel	Good Will
Dam Ascutney (USA) 1994	Right Word; 1982	Verbatim	Speak John
Dam Ascutney (USA) 1994	Right Word; 1982	Verbatim	Well Kept
Dam Ascutney (USA) 1994	Right Word; 1982	Oratorio	Fleet Nasrullah
Dam Ascutney (USA) 1994	Right Word; 1982	Oratorio	Classicist (Family: 17-b)
