= Elusive Quality =

American-bred Thoroughbred racehorse

- Sire: Gone West
- Grandsire: Mr. Prospector
- Dam: Touch of Greatness
- Damsire: Hero's Honour
- Sex: Stallion
- Foaled: 27 January 1993
- Died: 14 March 2018 (aged 25)
- Country: United States
- Colour: Bay
- Breeder: Silver Springs Stud Farm Inc. & Mrs. J. Costelloe
- Owner: Sheikh Mohammed bin Rashid Al Maktoum
- Record: 20: 9-3-2
- Earnings: $413,284

Major wins
- Poker Handicap (1998); Jaipur Stakes (1998)

Awards
- Leading sire in North America (2004)

Elusive Quality (January 27, 1993 – March 14, 2018) was an American Thoroughbred racehorse who was a record-setting sprinter on the racetrack and the leading sire in North America of 2004. He sired the 2004 Kentucky Derby winner Smarty Jones.

== Background ==
Elusive Quality was bred in Kentucky by Silver Springs Stud Farm and Marie Costelloe. He was owned by Sheikh Mohammed bin Rashid Al Maktoum, who put him into training with Bill Mott. Elusive Quality was sired by Gone West, a stakes winning son of Mr. Prospector. Elusive Quality's dam, Touch of Greatness, was an unraced daughter of Hero's Honor. She was a granddaughter of 1981 Kentucky Broodmare of the Year Natashka.

== Racing career ==
Elusive Quality raced twenty times and won nine times, including two stakes races, on both turf and dirt. He made his first start as a three-year-old on May 3, 1996, in a maiden special weight race at Belmont Park, which he won in front-running fashion by 11 1/2 lengths. His time for 1 1/16 miles over the sloppy main track was a solid 1:41.20. He was second in his next start, then won his third start, an allowance race at Belmont. Stepped up in class, he finished second in the King's Bishop Stakes at Saratota, nosed out at the wire by Honour and Glory. He was then eighth in the Vosburgh Stakes before being returned to allowance company, in which he finished second and first in his last two starts of the year.

Elusive Quality began his four-year-old campaign on February 21, 1997, in an allowance race at Gulfstream Park. He set a fast pace and continued to open up ground on the rest of the field to win by five lengths. His time of 1:20.17 for seven furlongs set a track record, and earned him the highest Beyer Speed Figure of the year for a sprinter. He was winless in his other four starts that year, with the highlight being a third-place finish in the Tom Fool Handicap.

Elusive Quality won four of seven starts at age five. He started the year with an allowance race win on February 5, 1998, at Gulfstream Park, then another allowance win on April 29 at Churchill Downs. Stepped up in class for the Metropolitan Handicap on May 25, he finished eighth. Just six days later though, Mott decided to switch Elusive Quality from dirt to turf. He responded by earning his first graded stakes win in the Jaipur Handicap, prevailing by a head in a time of 1:20.99 for seven furlongs over turf. On July 4 in the Poker Handicap, he went straight to the lead and won by six lengths while setting what was then a world record of 1:31.63 for one mile on the turf. "With this horse," said jockey Jerry Bailey, "you just break and hang on. If he feels like it, he wins. It seems he's more comfortable now that he runs on turf."

He finished his career with a fourth-place finish in the Woodbine Mile and a sixth in the Kelso Handicap. His career earnings were $413,284.

== Stud career ==
Elusive Quality retired to stud in 1999 for an initial fee of $10,000. He initially stood at Gainsborough Farm in Versailles, Kentucky before being relocated in 2007 to Darley America's Jonabell Farm in Lexington, Kentucky. During the South American breeding season, he was shuttled to Darley Australia or Stud TNT in Brazil. By 2005, his stud fee had increased to $100,000. At the time of his death in 2018, he had sired 51 graded stakes winners including eight champions. He was also the broodmare sire of 73 black-type winners.

=== Notable progeny ===
c = colt, f = filly, g = gelding

Foaled	Name	Sex	Major Wins
2000	Elusive City	c	Prix Morny
2001	Maryfield	f	Ballerina Stakes, Breeders' Cup Filly & Mare Sprint
2001	Smarty Jones	c	Kentucky Derby, Preakness Stakes
2004	Camarilla (AUS)	f	Sires' Produce Stakes
2005	Raven's Pass	c	Queen Elizabeth II Stakes, 2008 Breeders' Cup Classic
2006	Quality Road	c	Florida Derby, Donn Handicap, Metropolitan Handicap, Woodward Stakes
2008	Sepoy (AUS)	c	Blue Diamond Stakes, Golden Slipper Stakes, Manikato Stakes, Coolmore Stud Stakes
2009	Avenger Of Light (BRZ)	c	Linneo de Paula Machado
2009	Elusive Kate	f	Prix Marcel Boussac, Prix Rothschild (twice), Falmouth Stakes
2010	Certify	c	Fillies' Mile
2011	Birkin Bag (BRZ)	c	GP Diana
2011	Bonaparte (BRZ)	c	GP Derby Paulista
2011	Colorado Girl (BRZ)	f	GP Roberto e Nelson Grimaldi Seabra
2011	Last Kiss	f	GP Henrique de Toledo Lara
2011	Ohio	c	Frank E. Kilroe Mile
2015	She's a Julie	f	La Troienne Stakes, Ogden Phipps Stakes
2016	Ce Ce	f	Beholder Mile Stakes, Apple Blossom Handicap, Breeders' Cup Filly & Mare Sprint

== Death ==
Elusive Quality was euthanized on March 14, 2018, due to the infirmities of old age.

== Pedigree ==
Pedigree of Elusive Quality, bay stallion, foaled January 27, 1993
Sire Gone West bay 1984	Mr. Prospector b. 1970	Raise a Native ch. 1961	Native Dancer
Sire Gone West bay 1984	Mr. Prospector b. 1970	Raise a Native ch. 1961	Raise You
Sire Gone West bay 1984	Mr. Prospector b. 1970	Gold Digger b. 1962	Nashua
Sire Gone West bay 1984	Mr. Prospector b. 1970	Gold Digger b. 1962	Sequence
Sire Gone West bay 1984	Secrettame ch. 1978	Secretariat ch. 1970	Bold Ruler
Sire Gone West bay 1984	Secrettame ch. 1978	Secretariat ch. 1970	Somethingroyal
Sire Gone West bay 1984	Secrettame ch. 1978	Tamerett dkb/br. 1962	Tim Tam
Sire Gone West bay 1984	Secrettame ch. 1978	Tamerett dkb/br. 1962	Mixed Marriage
Dam Touch of Greatness bay 1986	Hero's Honor b. 1980	Northern Dancer b. 1961	Nearctic
Dam Touch of Greatness bay 1986	Hero's Honor b. 1980	Northern Dancer b. 1961	Natalma
Dam Touch of Greatness bay 1986	Hero's Honor b. 1980	Glowing Tribute b. 1973	Graustark
Dam Touch of Greatness bay 1986	Hero's Honor b. 1980	Glowing Tribute b. 1973	Admiring
Dam Touch of Greatness bay 1986	Ivory Wand b. 1973	Sir Ivor b. 1965	Sir Gaylord
Dam Touch of Greatness bay 1986	Ivory Wand b. 1973	Sir Ivor b. 1965	Attica
Dam Touch of Greatness bay 1986	Ivory Wand b. 1973	Natashka dkb/br. 1963	Dedicate
Dam Touch of Greatness bay 1986	Ivory Wand b. 1973	Natashka dkb/br. 1963	Natasha (Family 13-c)
