= Darley Racing =

Thoroughbred horse racing stable

Racing silks of Sheikh Mohammed (Darley Racing)

Darley Racing is a thoroughbred horse racing operations controlled by Sheikh Mohammed bin Rashid Al Maktoum, Ruler of Dubai and Vice President and Prime Minister of the United Arab Emirates. It was launched in 1981. Horses owned include Singspiel, Dubawi, and Cape Cross.

Darley Stud is the operation's breeding arm with stud farms in UK, Ireland, USA, and Australia.
