= Breeders' Cup Classic =

American Thoroughbred horse race

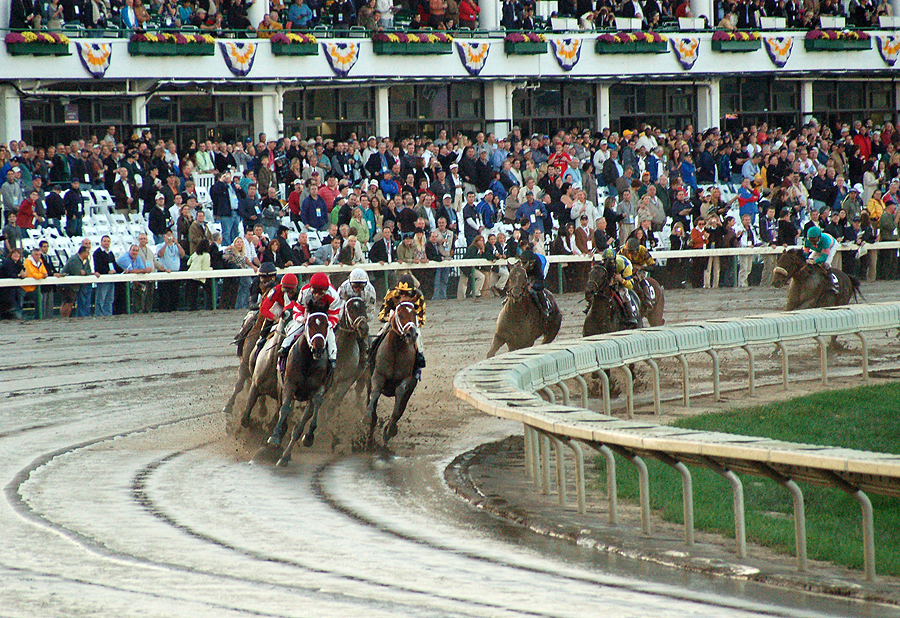
- The first turn in the 2007 Classic
- Class: Grade I
- Location: North America
- Inaugurated: 1984
- Race type: Thoroughbred
- Website: www.breederscup.com

Race information
- Distance: 1 1/4 miles
- Surface: Dirt
- Track: Left-handed
- Qualification: 3-year-olds and up
- Weight: 4-year-olds and up: 126 lb (57.2 kg); 3-year-olds: Northern Hemisphere 122 lb (55 kg), Southern Hemisphere 117 lb (53 kg); Fillies and mares allowed 3 pounds.
- Purse: US$7 Million (2024)

The Breeders' Cup Classic is a Grade I Weight for Age thoroughbred horse race for 3-year-olds and older run at a distance of 1 1/4 miles (2,000 m) on dirt. It is held annually at a different racetrack in the United States as part of the Breeders' Cup World Championships in late October or early November. All of the races to date have been held in the United States except for the 1996 edition held at Woodbine Racetrack in Toronto, Canada.

The Classic is considered by many to be the premier thoroughbred horse race of the year in the U.S., although the Kentucky Derby is more widely known among casual racing fans. Once the richest race in the world, in more recent years, only the Saudi Cup, Dubai World Cup, The Everest and Prix de l'Arc de Triomphe have had consistently higher purses. Often, the winner of the Classic goes on to win U.S. Horse of the Year honors, including the four winners of the race between 2004 and 2007—respectively Ghostzapper, Saint Liam, Invasor, and Curlin. Due to the extremely high quality of horses in the event, the race is notoriously hard to predict. One notable example of an underdog winning the Classic is the victory of Arcangues in 1993. This was the biggest upset in Breeders' Cup history and his $269.20 payoff for a $2 wager remains a Breeders' Cup record.

The Classic is now regarded as the fourth leg of horse racing's Grand Slam of Thoroughbred racing — the traditional Triple Crown (Kentucky Derby, Preakness Stakes, and Belmont Stakes) plus the Breeders' Cup Classic. After American Pharoah's Triple Crown win earlier in 2015, the term became popular; the colt became the first horse to ever accomplish this feat.

== Notable renewals ==
=== 1980s ===
The first running of the Breeders' Cup Classic in 1984 produced an exciting finish between 30–1 longshot Wild Again on the inside, Gate Dancer on the outside and favorite Slew o' Gold in between. The three battled down the stretch with Wild Again shifting his path away from the rail and Gate Dancer "lugging in" towards the rail, squeezing out Slew O' Gold. Wild Again finished a neck in front of Gate Dancer with Slew o' Gold less than a length behind. After a 10-minute stewards' inquiry, Wild Again was left in first place but Gate Dancer was disqualified to third.

The 1987 renewal featured the face-off between two Kentucky Derby winners, Ferdinand and Alysheba. Ferdinand, who won the Derby in 1986, reached the lead in mid-stretch, then struggled to hold off the late charge of Alysheba. In a photo finish, Ferdinand prevailed by a nose and would later be named Horse of the Year. Alysheba came back in 1988 to win the Classic, becoming the then-leading money earner in history.

In the 1989 renewal, Sunday Silence and Easy Goer faced off for the last time in one of racing's most famous rivalries. Sunday Silence had beaten Easy Goer in the Kentucky Derby and Preakness Stakes but Easy Goer turned the tables in the Belmont. Easy Goer then won the Whitney, Travers, Woodward and Jockey Club Gold Cup, making him the 1–2 favorite in the Classic. Sunday Silence raced five lengths behind the early leaders, with Easy Goer six lengths further behind. Easy Goer made a move down the backstretch and got next to Sunday Silence, who then made his own move as they rounded the final turn. Sunday Silence opened up a three-length lead, but Easy Goer again started closing down the stretch. At the wire, Sunday Silence prevailed by a neck, earning him Horse of the Year honors.

=== 1990s ===
The 1993 renewal saw the biggest upset in Breeders' Cup history when the French-based Arcangues won at odds of 133–1. California-based horses had dominated at Santa Anita in the preceding races, and Bertrando was expected to continue the trend. He set the early pace and had a comfortable lead coming down the stretch, only to be caught near the wire. Arcangues' jockey Jerry Bailey had timed the run perfectly, even though he had never ridden the horse before. "I couldn't understand the instructions the trainer (André Fabre) gave me in the paddock", he said. "I don't even know how to pronounce the horse's name. But sometimes a horse runs best when he is ridden by someone who has never been on him before."

In 1995, Cigar came into the Classic having won seven straight Grade I races and was made the 3–5 favorite. On a muddy track, he scored a 2 1/2 length victory in the excellent time of 1:59 2/5, then the fastest Classic ever run. When calling the race, track announcer Tom Durkin referred to him as the "unconquerable, invincible, unbeatable" Cigar – a phrase that would be associated with the horse for the rest of his life.

=== 2000s ===
Although Tiznow won the Breeders' Cup Classic and Horse of the Year honors in 2000, he is best known for his effort in the 2001 renewal. Tiznow experienced a variety of physical problems throughout the year and came into the Classic with only two wins in five starts. Facing him was an exceptionally strong European contingent that included Galileo and Sakhee. The 2001 Breeders' Cup took place at Belmont Park in New York and was the first major sporting event since 9–11, so security was exceptionally heavy. Europeans won many of the early races on the card and looked set to take the Classic when Sakhee hit the lead in mid-stretch. Tiznow fought back and won the race by a nose, with Tom Durkin calling, "Tiznow wins it for America!" Tiznow became the first and to-date only two-time winner of the Classic.

In the 2009 Classic, Zenyatta came into the Breeders' Cup with a perfect record of 13 wins from 13 starts. Rather than trying to defend her title in the Ladies Classic (now known as the Distaff), her connections decided to enter her in the Classic against male horses. The race was run on Santa Anita's Polytrack synthetic dirt surface, which attracted several turf competitors including Gio Ponti (Man o' War, Arlington Million), Twice Over (Champion Stakes) and Rip Van Winkle (Sussex, Queen Elizabeth II), who hoped to repeat Raven's Pass upset victory in the 2008 Classic. The field also included Mine That Bird (Kentucky Derby), Summer Bird (Belmont and Travers) and Einstein (Santa Anita Handicap), but Quality Road (Florida Derby) was scratched when he refused to load in the starting gate. When the race finally got underway, Zenyatta broke poorly and on the wrong lead. As was her custom, she dropped far back in the early running then started her move around the far turn. Jockey Mike Smith guided her between horses near the rail, then swung the mare wide as they entered the stretch. Zenyatta quickly regained stride and closed on the early leaders, winning by a length over Gio Ponti. Mike Smith believed she would have won by more if she had not slowed when the crowd started to react. "She started pricking her ears and looking at the crowd", he said. "And she still went, believe it or not, well within herself. She was pricking her ears and galloped out. She didn't even take a breath after the race was over. It's just incredible." Zenyatta became the first and still the only female horse to win the Classic.

== Automatic berths ==
Beginning in 2007, the Breeders' Cup developed the Breeders' Cup Challenge, a series of races in each division that allotted automatic qualifying bids to winners of defined races. Each of the fourteen divisions has multiple qualifying races. Note though that one horse may win multiple challenge races, while other challenge winners will not be entered in the Breeders' Cup for a variety of reasons such as injury or travel considerations.

In the Classic division, runners are limited to 14 and there are up to 11 automatic berths. The 2026 "Win and You're In" races were:

1. The Pegasus World Cup Invitational Stakes, a Grade I race run in January at Gulfstream Park in Hallandale Beach, Florida
2. The February Stakes, a Group One race run in February at Tokyo Racecourse in Fuchū, Tokyo, Japan
3. The Saudi Cup, a Group One race run in February at King Abdulaziz Racetrack in Riyadh, Saudi Arabia
4. The Dubai World Cup, a Group One race run in March at Meydan Racecourse in Dubai, United Arab Emirates
5. The Stephen Foster Handicap, a Grade I race run in June at Churchill Downs in Louisville, Kentucky
6. The Haskell Invitational, a Grade I race run in July at Monmouth Park in Oceanport, New Jersey
7. The Whitney Stakes, a Grade I race run in August at Saratoga Race Course in Saratoga Springs, New York
8. The International Stakes, a Group One race run in August at York Racecourse in York, England
9. The Pacific Classic Stakes, a Grade I race run in August at Del Mar Racetrack in Del Mar, California
10. The Goodwood Stakes, a Grade I race run in September at Santa Anita Park in Arcadia, California
11. The Jockey Club Gold Cup, a Grade I race run in September at Belmont Park in Elmont, New York

== Records ==
Most wins:

- 2 – Tiznow (2000, 2001)

Stakes record:

- The fastest time recorded in the Breeders Cup Classic belongs to Ghostzapper, who set the mark of 1:59.02 under Javier Castellano in 2004 at Lone Star Park. Because the Breeders' Cup Classic is run at different racetracks each year, some of which are faster than others, there is no official stakes record. Note though that Authentic's revised time of 1:59.60 set a record at Keeneland, Ghostzapper's time of 1:59.02 set a track record at Lone Star Park and Alphabet Soup's time of 2:01.0 set a track record on Woodbine's old dirt track.

Largest winning margins:

- 8 1/4 lengths - Flightline (2022)

Most wins by a jockey:

- 5 – Chris McCarron (1988, 1989, 1996, 2000, 2001)
- 5 – Jerry Bailey (1991, 1993, 1994, 1995, 2005)

Most wins by a trainer:

- 4 – Bob Baffert (2014, 2015, 2016, 2020)

Most wins by an owner:

- 2 – Stronach Stables (1998, 2004)

== Winners ==
Year	Winner	Age	Jockey	Trainer	Owner	Time	Purse $	Track	Ref
2026	Sovereignty	4	Junior Alvarado	William I. Mott	Godolphin	2:00.36	$7,000,000	Keeneland	
2025	Forever Young (JPN)	4	Ryusei Sakai	Yoshito Yahagi	Susumu Fujita	2:00.19	$7,000,000	Del Mar	
2024	Sierra Leone	3	Flavien Prat	Chad C. Brown	Brant, Peter M, Magnier. Mrs.John Tabor, Michael Smith, Derrick, Westerberg, and Smith, Brook T.	2:00.78	$7,000,000	Del Mar	
2023	White Abarrio	4	Irad Ortiz Jr.	Richard E. Dutrow Jr.	C2 Racing Stable LLC and La Milagrosa Stable, LLC	2:02.87	$6,000,000	Santa Anita	
2022	Flightline	4	Flavien Prat	John W. Sadler	Hronis Racing LLC, Summer Wind Equine, West Point Thoroughbreds, Inc., Siena Farm LLC & Woodford Racing, LLC	2:00.05	$6,000,000	Keeneland	
2021	Knicks Go	5	Joel Rosario	Brad H. Cox	Korea Racing Authority	1:59.57	$6,000,000	Del Mar	
2020	Authentic	3	John R. Velazquez	Bob Baffert	Spendthrift Farm	1:59.60	$6,000,000	Keeneland	
2019	Vino Rosso	4	Irad Ortiz Jr.	Todd A. Pletcher	Mike Repole	2:02.80	$6,000,000	Santa Anita	
2018	Accelerate	5	Joel Rosario	John W. Sadler	Hronis Racing LLC	2:02.93	$6,000,000	Churchill Downs	
2017	Gun Runner	4	Florent Geroux	Steven M. Asmussen	Winchell Thoroughbreds & Three Chimneys Farm	2:01.29	$6,000,000	Del Mar	
2016	Arrogate	3	Mike E. Smith	Bob Baffert	Juddmonte Farms	2:00.11	$6,000,000	Santa Anita	
2015	American Pharoah	3	Victor Espinoza	Bob Baffert	Zayat Stables	2:00.07	$5,000,000	Keeneland	
2014	Bayern	3	Martin Garcia	Bob Baffert	Kaleem Shah	1:59.88	$5,000,000	Santa Anita	
2013	Mucho Macho Man	5	Gary Stevens	Katherine Ritvo	Reeves Thoroughbred Racing	2:00.72	$5,000,000	Santa Anita	
2012	Fort Larned	4	Brian Hernandez Jr.	Ian Wilkes	Janis R. Whitham	2:00.11	$5,000,000	Santa Anita	
2011	Drosselmeyer	4	Mike E. Smith	William I. Mott	WinStar Farm LLC	2:04.27	$5,000,000	Churchill Downs	
2010	Blame	4	Garrett Gomez	Albert Stall Jr.	Claiborne Farm & Adele Dilschneider	2:02.28	$5,000,000	Churchill Downs	
2009	Zenyatta	5	Mike E. Smith	John Shirreffs	Jerry & Ann Moss	2:00.32	$5,000,000	Santa Anita	
2008	Raven's Pass	3	Frankie Dettori	John Gosden	Princess Haya/Darley Racing	1:59.27	$5,000,000	Santa Anita	
2007	Curlin	3	Robby Albarado	Steven M. Asmussen	Stonestreet Stables et al.	2:00.59	$5,000,000	Monmouth Park	
2006	Invasor (ARG)	4	Fernando Jara	Kiaran McLaughlin	Shadwell Racing	2:02.18	$5,000,000	Churchill Downs	
2005	Saint Liam	5	Jerry Bailey	Richard Dutrow Jr.	M/M William K. Warren Jr.	2:01.49	$5,000,000	Belmont Park	
2004	Ghostzapper	4	Javier Castellano	Robert J. Frankel	Stronach Stables	1:59.02	$4,000,000	Lone Star Park	
2003	Pleasantly Perfect	5	Alex Solis	Richard Mandella	Diamond A Racing Corp.	1:59.88	$4,000,000	Santa Anita	
2002	Volponi	4	José A. Santos	Philip G. Johnson	Amherst & Spruce Pond Stable	2:01.39	$4,000,000	Arlington Park	
2001	Tiznow	4	Chris McCarron	Jay M. Robbins	Cee's Stables	2:00.62	$4,000,000	Belmont Park	
2000	Tiznow	3	Chris McCarron	Jay M. Robbins	Cooper & Straub-Rubens	2:00.75	$4,000,000	Churchill Downs	
1999	Cat Thief	3	Pat Day	D. Wayne Lukas	Overbrook Farm	1:59.52	$4,000,000	Gulfstream Park	
1998	Awesome Again (CAN)	4	Pat Day	Patrick B. Byrne	Stronach Stables	2:02.16	$4,000,000	Churchill Downs	
1997	Skip Away	4	Mike E. Smith	Sonny Hine	Carolyn Hine	1:59.16	$4,400,000	Hollywood Park	
1996	Alphabet Soup	5	Chris McCarron	David Hofmans	Ridder Thoroughbred Stable	2:01.00	$4,000,000	Woodbine	
1995	Cigar	5	Jerry Bailey	William I. Mott	Allen E. Paulson	1:59.58	$3,000,000	Belmont Park	
1994	Concern	3	Jerry Bailey	Richard W. Small	Robert E. Meyerhoff	2:02.41	$3,000,000	Churchill Downs	
1993	Arcangues (FR)	5	Jerry Bailey	André Fabre	Daniel Wildenstein	2:00.83	$3,000,000	Santa Anita	
1992	A.P. Indy	3	Ed Delahoussaye	Neil Drysdale	Tomonori Tsurumaki, William S. Farish III, William S. Kilroy	2:00.20	$3,000,000	Gulfstream Park	
1991	Black Tie Affair (IRE)	5	Jerry Bailey	Ernie T. Poulos	Jeffrey Sullivan	2:02.95	$3,000,000	Churchill Downs	
1990	Unbridled	3	Pat Day	Carl Nafzger	Frances A. Genter	2:02.20	$3,000,000	Belmont Park	
1989	Sunday Silence	3	Chris McCarron	Charlie Whittingham	H-G-W Partners	2:00.20	$3,000,000	Gulfstream Park	
1988	Alysheba	4	Chris McCarron	Jack Van Berg	Dorothy & Pam Scharbauer	2:04.80	$3,000,000	Churchill Downs	
1987	Ferdinand	4	Bill Shoemaker	Charlie Whittingham	Elizabeth A. Keck	2:01.40	$3,000,000	Hollywood Park	
1986	Skywalker	4	Laffit Pincay Jr.	Michael Whittingham	Oak Cliff Stables	2:00.40	$3,000,000	Santa Anita	
1985	Proud Truth	3	Jorge Velásquez	John M. Veitch	Darby Dan Farm	2:00.80	$3,000,000	Aqueduct	
1984	Wild Again	4	Pat Day	Vincent Timphony	Black Chip Stable (William Allen, Ron Volkman, Terry Beall)	2:03.40	$3,000,000	Hollywood Park	

== See also ==
- Breeders' Cup Classic "top three finishers" and starters
- American thoroughbred racing top attended events
- Grand Slam of Thoroughbred Racing
