= It's a Monster =

It's a Monster may refer to:

- "It's a Monster" (Battle for Dream Island), a 2013 web series episode
- "It ('s a Monster)", a 1990 song by Extreme
- It's a Monster (horse) (born 1999), a racehorse in 2002's Chick Lang Stakes top three finishers who won the 2003 Longfellow Stakes
