= My Miss Aurelia =

American-bred Thoroughbred racehorse

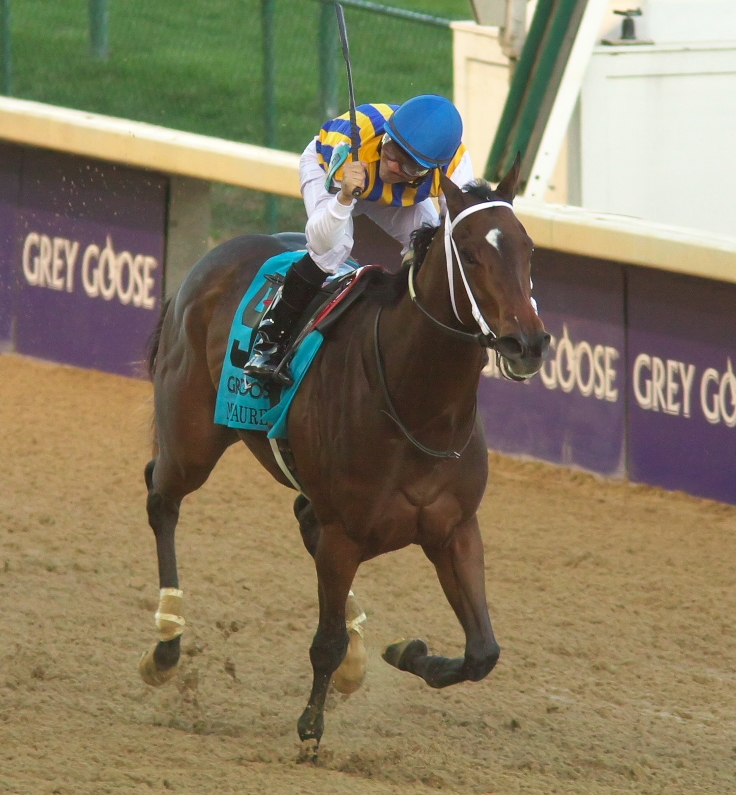
- My Miss Aurelia wins the 2011 Breeders' Cup Juvenile Fillies.
- Sire: Smart Strike
- Grandsire: Mr. Prospector
- Dam: My Miss Storm Cat
- Damsire: Sea of Secrets
- Sex: Mare
- Foaled: 16 March 2009
- Country: United States
- Colour: Bay
- Breeder: Stonestreet Stables
- Owner: Stonestreet Stables & George Bolton
- Trainer: Steve Asmussen; Todd Pletcher
- Record: 10:6-1-3
- Earnings: $2,437,000

Major wins
- Adirondack Stakes (2011); Frizette Stakes (2011); Breeders' Cup Juvenile Fillies (2011); Cotillion Stakes (2012)

Awards
- American Champion Two-Year-Old Filly (2011)

My Miss Aurelia (foaled 16 March 2009) is an American Thoroughbred racehorse. As a two-year-old in 2011, she was unbeaten in four races including the Adirondack Stakes, Frizette Stakes and Breeders' Cup Juvenile Fillies and was voted American Champion Two-Year-Old Filly at the Eclipse Award. After missing the early part of the following season through injury she took her winning run to six with two more victories including a win over Questing in the Cotillion Stakes. She sustained her first defeat when second to Royal Delta in the Breeders' Cup Ladies Classic and was beaten in her only subsequent race that year. She finished third on her only appearance as a four-year-old and was retired in September 2014 to Stonestreet Farm.

== Background ==
My Miss Aurelia is a bay mare with an irregularly-shaped white star bred in Kentucky by Stonestreet Thoroughbred Holdings. She was sired by Smart Strike, a Canadian stallion who was Leading sire in North America in 2007, 2008 and 2009. Her dam, My Miss Storm Cat, was a successful racemare who won five of her seven races between 2004 and 2006. As a descendant of the broodmare Flaring Top, My Miss Storm Cat came from the same branch of Thoroughbred family 8f which produced the British Classic Race winners Nijinsky, The Minstrel and Lahan.

As a yearling, the filly was sent to the Keeneland sales in September where she was bought for $550,000 by George Bolton, who later sold a half-share in the filly back to her breeders. During her racing career, My Miss Aurelia, who was named after Bolton's mother, was officially owned in partnership by Bolton and Stonestreet Stables and was trained by Steve Asmussen.

== Racing career ==
=== 2011: two-year-old season ===
My Miss Aurelia began her racing career with two races at the Saratoga meeting in the summer of 2011. On July 22 she was ridden by Julien Leparoux in a maiden race over 5 1/2 furlongs. The filly tracked the leaders before taking the lead inside the final furlong and kicking clear to win by a length from Delightful Magic and five others in a time of 1:03.59. In the following month the filly was moved up in class and distance for Grade II Adirondack Stakes over 6 1/2 furlongs. Starting the odds-on favourite, she took the lead approaching the straight and got the better of a prolonged struggle with Millionreasonswhy to win by a neck, with the pair finishing almost fifteen lengths clear of the other three runners.

Corey Nakatani took over the ride on My Miss Aurelia when the filly was stepped up to Grade I level in the Frizette Stakes at Belmont Park on October 8 when she started second favorite behind the Todd Pletcher-trained Stopshoppingmaria. My Miss Aurelia took the lead soon after the start and steadily increased her advantage, drawing away in the straight to win by 5 1/2 lengths from Stopshoppingmaria without Nakatani having to resort to the whip. My Miss Aurelia's final race of the year was the Breeders' Cup Juvenile Fillies at Churchill Downs for which she was made favorite ahead of the Spinaway Stakes winner Grace Hall. Nakatani tracked the leader Candrea before moving into the lead with 2 1/2 furlongs to run. She went clear of her rivals in the straight and won by three lengths from Grace Hall, who was in turn six lengths clear of Weemissfrankie in third place.

=== 2012: three-year-old season ===
My Miss Aurelia missed the early part of the 2012 season with a shin injury and did not run as a three-year-old until August, when she started 1/4 favorite for the Mandy's Gold Stakes at Saratoga. Julien Leparoux had some difficulty keeping the filly on a straight course in the closing stages but she won by three lengths from Delightful Quality. On September 22 My Miss Aurelia was matched against Questing, the winner of the CCA Oaks and the Alabama Stakes in the Grade I Cotillion Stakes over 8 1/2 furlongs at Parx. Ridden by Nakatani, she started at odds of 9/5, whilst Questing, who was carrying seven pounds more was made the 2/5 favorite. My Miss Aurelia tracked Questing before moving up alongside the favorite on the final turn. The two fillies raced together throughout the final quarter mile, bumping several times, before My Miss Aurelia prevailed by a head to take her unbeaten run to six in what was described as a "terrific finish".

On November 2, My Miss Aurelia started 6.2/1 third favorite for the Breeders' Cup Ladies Classic at Santa Anita Park in a field which included Royal Delta (winner of the race in 2010), Questing, Awesome Feather (undefeated in ten races) and Grace Hall. Nakatani restrained the filly in the early stages before making a forward move in the straight. She was unable to mount a serious challenge to Royal Delta but finished second, 1 1/2 lengths behind the winner and one and a quarter lengths ahead of Include Me Out in third. On her final appearance of the year, My Miss Aurelia was dropped back in distance to contest the Grade I La Brea Stakes over seven furlongs at Santa Anita on December 26. She started the 2/5 favorite despite conceding five pounds to her opponents, but was beaten into third place behind Book Review and Reneesgotzip.

=== 2013: four-year-old season ===
My Miss Aurelia remained in training as a four-year-old, but made only one appearance. On March 16 she was made favorite for the Grade III Azeri Stakes over nine furlongs at Oaklawn Park, but after racing in second place for much of the race, she was unable to make progress in the closing stages and finished third, 5 1/2 lengths behind the winner Tiz Miz Sue. In August 2013, after spending some time at Stonestreet Stable's Farm in Florida, My Miss Aurelia's training was taken over by Todd Pletcher. The filly was being prepared for a return in the Punkin Pie Stakes at Belmont in October, but was withdrawn after sustaining a hoof injury described as "shedding a frog".

=== 2014: five-year-old season ===
More than sixteen months after her previous race, My Miss Aurelia returned in a minor race over seven furlongs at Saratoga on 21 July and finished third of the four runners. She was retired from racing in September 2014 and relocated to Stonestreet Farms. She is in foal to Tapit for the 2016 season.

== Assessment and honors ==
In the Eclipse Awards for 2011, My Miss Aurelia was named American Champion Two-Year-Old Filly, taking 247 of the 248 votes (the other vote went to Stephanie's Kitten). In the following year's awards, My Miss Aurelia narrowly failed to win the title of American Champion Three-Year-Old Filly receiving 102 votes to Questing's 106.

== Pedigree ==
Pedigree of My Miss Aurelia (USA), bay mare, 2009
Sire Smart Strike (USA) 1992	Mr. Prospector (USA); 1970	Raise a Native	Native Dancer
Sire Smart Strike (USA) 1992	Mr. Prospector (USA); 1970	Raise a Native	Raise You
Sire Smart Strike (USA) 1992	Mr. Prospector (USA); 1970	Gold Digger	Nashua
Sire Smart Strike (USA) 1992	Mr. Prospector (USA); 1970	Gold Digger	Sequence
Sire Smart Strike (USA) 1992	Classy 'n Smart (CAN); 1981	Smarten	Cyane
Sire Smart Strike (USA) 1992	Classy 'n Smart (CAN); 1981	Smarten	Smartaire
Sire Smart Strike (USA) 1992	Classy 'n Smart (CAN); 1981	No Class	Nodouble
Sire Smart Strike (USA) 1992	Classy 'n Smart (CAN); 1981	No Class	Classy Quillo
Dam My Miss Storm Cat (USA) 2002	Sea of Secrets (USA); 1995	Storm Cat	Storm Bird
Dam My Miss Storm Cat (USA) 2002	Sea of Secrets (USA); 1995	Storm Cat	Terlingua
Dam My Miss Storm Cat (USA) 2002	Sea of Secrets (USA); 1995	Love From Mom	Mr. Prospector
Dam My Miss Storm Cat (USA) 2002	Sea of Secrets (USA); 1995	Love From Mom	Hoso
Dam My Miss Storm Cat (USA) 2002	Urmia (USA); 1988	Meadowlake	Hold Your Peace
Dam My Miss Storm Cat (USA) 2002	Urmia (USA); 1988	Meadowlake	Suspicious Native
Dam My Miss Storm Cat (USA) 2002	Urmia (USA); 1988	Chaldea	Cutlass
Dam My Miss Storm Cat (USA) 2002	Urmia (USA); 1988	Chaldea	Flight (Family: 8-f)
