= Brightwork (horse) =

American-bred Thoroughbred racehorse

- Sire: Outwork
- Grandsire: Uncle Mo
- Dam: Clarendon Fancy
- Damsire: Malibu Moon
- Sex: filly
- Foaled: March 17, 2021
- Country: United States
- Color: Bay
- Breeder: Wynnstay & H. Allen Poindexter
- Owner: WSS Racing
- Trainer: John A. Ortiz
- Record: 6: 4 - 0 - 0
- Earnings: $501,376

Major wins
- Adirondack Stakes (2023); Spinaway Stakes (2023)
- Last updated on November 4, 2023

Brightwork (foaled March 17, 2021) is a multiple graded winning American Thoroughbred racehorse. The filly won the Grade I Spinaway Stakes at Saratoga Race Course in 2023.

== Background ==
Brightwork is bay filly who was bred in Kentucky by Wynnstay and H. Allen Poindexter. Brightwork is out of the unraced Malibu Moon mare Clarendon Fancy, who has produced two winners, including stakes-placed Quiet Company, from three starters.

Brightwork sire is Outwork winner of the 2013 Grade I Wood Memorial Stakes is the sire of two Grade I winners and both of them winning the Spinaway Stakes. His daughter Leave No Trace captured last year's edition. Outwork stood the 2023 season for US$10,000 at WinStar Farm.

Brightwork was purchased as a weanling at the 2021 Fasig-Tipton Kentucky November Sale for $95,000 by Barber Road Bloodstock for WSS Racing.

Brightwork is trained by John Alexander Ortiz.

== Career ==
Brightwork began her career with a three-length victory in a Maiden Special Weight event at Keeneland on 26 April 2023. After a break of two months, she won the Debutante Stakes, which was moved from Churchill Downs to Ellis Park Race Course. Facing three other fillies, Brightwork led all the way, defeating 1/3 favorite V V's Dream.

Brightwork faced graded company for the first time on August 6, 2023, in the Grade III Adirondack Stakes at Saratoga Race Course. Sent off at 5/1, she was timed in 1:16.85 for the 6 1/2 furlongs for the victory. Trainer John Ortiz was emotional in winning his first graded event. "That meant so much to me," he said about being hugged by Mott after the race. "It's so emotional. I grew up in his barn and was there when I was 8-years-old."

On September 3, 2023, Brightwork defeated the heavy 2/5 favorite Ways and Means in the Grade I Spinaway Stakes at Saratoga Race Course. She completed the seven furlongs in 1:23.17 on a fast track, winning by 1/2 a length.

== Statistics ==
Date	Distance	Race	Grade	Track	Odds	Field	Finish	Winning Time	Winning (Losing) Margin	Jockey	Ref
2023 – two-year-old season
Apr 26, 2023	4 1/2 furlongs	Maiden Special Weight		Keeneland	4.03	12	1	0:52.49	3 lengths	Reylu Gutierrez	
Jul 2, 2023	6 furlongs	Debutante Stakes	Listed	Ellis Park	2.28	4	1	1:09.79	1/2 length	Luis Saez	
Aug 6, 2023	6 1/2 furlongs	Adirondack Stakes	III	Saratoga	5.10	8	1	1:16.85	5 lengths	Irad Ortiz Jr.	
Sep 3, 2023	7 furlongs	Spinaway Stakes	I	Saratoga	3.00	8 (Note: Nine horses entered the starting gate but Miz Sense was declared a non-runner as he acted-up just as the gate opened, became very unruly while thrashing around in the stall then unseated rider)	1	1:23.17	1/2 length	Irad Ortiz Jr.	
Oct 6, 2023	1 1/16 miles	Alcibiades Stakes	I	Keeneland	1.80	8	5	1:44.17	(10 1/4 lengths )	Irad Ortiz Jr.	
Nov 3, 2023	1 1/16 miles	Breeders' Cup Juvenile Fillies	I	Santa Anita	22.40	12	6	1:44.58	(6 3/4 lengths )	Ricardo Santana Jr.	

Notes:
An (*) asterisk after the odds means Brightwork was the post-time favorite.

== Pedigree ==
Pedigree of Brightwork, bay filly, March 17, 2021
Sire Outwork (2013)	Uncle Mo (2008)	Indian Charlie (1995)	In Excess (IRE) (1987)
Sire Outwork (2013)	Uncle Mo (2008)	Indian Charlie (1995)	Soviet Sojourn (1989)
Sire Outwork (2013)	Uncle Mo (2008)	Playa Maya (2000)	Arch (1995)
Sire Outwork (2013)	Uncle Mo (2008)	Playa Maya (2000)	Dixie Slippers (1995)
Sire Outwork (2013)	Nonna Mia (2007)	Empire Maker (2000)	Unbridled (1987)
Sire Outwork (2013)	Nonna Mia (2007)	Empire Maker (2000)	Toussaud (1989)
Sire Outwork (2013)	Nonna Mia (2007)	Holy Bubbette (2000)	Holy Bull (1991)
Sire Outwork (2013)	Nonna Mia (2007)	Holy Bubbette (2000)	Juliac (1983)
Dam Clarendon Fancy (2012)	Malibu Moon (1997)	A.P. Indy (1995)	Seattle Slew (1974)
Dam Clarendon Fancy (2012)	Malibu Moon (1997)	A.P. Indy (1995)	Weekend Surprise (1980)
Dam Clarendon Fancy (2012)	Malibu Moon (1997)	Macoumba (1992)	Mr. Prospector (1970)
Dam Clarendon Fancy (2012)	Malibu Moon (1997)	Macoumba (1992)	Maximova (FR) (1980)
Dam Clarendon Fancy (2012)	Catch My Fancy (2003)	Yes It's True (1996)	Is It True (1986)
Dam Clarendon Fancy (2012)	Catch My Fancy (2003)	Yes It's True (1996)	Clever Monique (1988)
Dam Clarendon Fancy (2012)	Catch My Fancy (2003)	Walk Away Rene (1993)	Gold Alert (1983)
Dam Clarendon Fancy (2012)	Catch My Fancy (2003)	Walk Away Rene (1993)	Monique Rene (1978) (family A1)
