= Michael Hole =

British jockey (1941–1976)

Personal information
- Born: March 29, 1941 Canterbury, England
- Died: April 22, 1976 (age 34) Jones Beach, New York
- Occupation: Jockey

Horse racing career
- Sport: Horse racing
- Career wins: 2042

Major racing wins
- Princeton Handicap (1967); Jersey Derby (1969); New York Stakes (1969); Orange Bowl Handicap (1969); Salvator Mile Handicap (1969); Canadian Turf Handicap (1971); Comely Stakes (1971); Gazelle Handicap (1971); Jim Dandy Stakes (1971); Longfellow Handicap (1971); Monmouth Oaks (1971, 1973); Everglades Stakes (1972, 1973, 1975); Lamplighter Stakes (1972); Amory L. Haskell Handicap (1972); Colonial Handicap (1973); Governor Stakes (1974); Marlboro Cup Handicap (1974); Molly Pitcher Stakes (1974); Roseben Handicap (1974); Westchester Handicap (1974); Derby Trial Stakes (1975); Fashion Stakes (1975); Sorority Stakes (1975); Spinaway Stakes (1975); Arlington-Washington Lassie Stakes (1975); Astoria Stakes (1975); Bahamas Stakes (1975); Debutante Stakes (1975); Oak Leaf Stakes (1975); Grey Lag Handicap (1976)

Racing awards
- Leading jockey at Monmouth Park (1970)

Significant horses
- Big Spruce, Dearly Precious, Desert Vixen, Forward Gal, In Reality

Michael "Mike" Hole (March 29, 1941 – April 22, 1976) was a jockey in American Thoroughbred horse racing.

Born in Canterbury, England, Michael Hole moved to the United States in 1961 where he rode professionally for fourteen years, winning 2042 races while riding horses to earnings of US$13,520,479. He was a regular rider at NYRA tracks in New York and at Monmouth Park Racetrack, Garden State Park Racetrack, and the Atlantic City Race Course in New Jersey. In winter, Michael Hole relocated to Florida where he competed at Tropical Park, Hialeah Park and at Gulfstream Park.

In the U.S. Triple Crown series, Michael Hole rode in three Kentucky Derbys with his best result a fifth-place finish in 1973. He finished tenth in the 1970 Preakness Stakes. Among his early major wins, Michael Hole captured the 1969 Jersey Derby aboard Al Hattab. In 1971, he took over as the regular rider of the 1970 American Champion Two-Year-Old Filly, Forward Gal, piloting her to wins in the Comely Stakes, Gazelle Handicap, Monmouth Oaks and the Betsy Ross Handicap. In 1975, Michael Hole was the principal rider of Dearly Precious, helping to guide her to that year's Eclipse Award as the American Champion Two-Year-Old Filly.

On May 11, 1968, Michael Hole rode four winners on a single race card at Suffolk Downs then did it for the second time on January 3, 1970, at Gulfstream Park and for a third time at Aqueduct Racetrack on November 6, 1974. His most successful winning day came on November 8, 1969, at Garden State Park when he rode five winners of which four came in succession.

== Death speculation ==
On April 22, 1976, Michael Hole was found dead in the front seat of his car in a parking lot at Jones Beach on Long Island, not far from his home in Garden City, New York. The death was reported by Long Island parkway police as a suicide by asphyxiation when the exhaust pipe of his vehicle was found to have been deliberately blocked. Much speculation about Michael Hole's death followed when a major scandal erupted involving mobster "Fat" Tony Ciulla, a member of the Boston, Massachusetts Winter Hill Gang who admitted to paying jockeys to fix hundreds of races at New York tracks and five other states in 1974 and 1975. As late as October 26, 2005, the Los Angeles Times reiterated that "the theory lingers that Hole, a reluctant race-fixer, was a victim of foul play." That his life may have been in danger became a certainty when a November 6, 1978 feature story by Sports Illustrated reported that trainer John Cotter testified before the New York State Racing and Wagering Board that Michael Hole told him he had been offered $5,000 to hold back one of his horses at Saratoga Race Course during the 1974 meeting. In testimony given in exchange for immunity, mobster Tony Ciulla, a close associate of the notorious Whitey Bulger who was wanted by the FBI on nineteen counts of murder, confirmed he had made the bribe attempt to Hole through one of his jockey intermediaries, first offering $5,000 and then upping it to $10,000, but that Hole had turned him down. Sports Illustrated said that after Hole had told trainer John Cotter of the bribe attempt, he reported it to Warren Mehrtens, a track steward and well-known former jockey, and the information was turned over to the New York State Racing and Wagering Board, the Thoroughbred Racing Protective Bureau and the FBI.

At the time of his death, Michael Hole had been suffering from mental health problems and had been seeing a psychiatrist. In the 1960s and '70s, he was a top jockey earning more than $100,000 a year and he and his wife Yvonne maintained a home in Garden City, New York, a place in Miami, Florida for the winter racing season, and owned a farm in Maryland. The couple had a daughter, Vanessa, and a son, Taylor. In 1992, Taylor Hole made his debut as a professional jockey at Rockingham Park and he has since won more than 2000 races.
