= Countess Diana =

American-bred Thoroughbred racehorse

- Sire: Deerhound
- Grandsire: Danzig
- Dam: T V Countess
- Damsire: T V Commercial
- Sex: Mare
- Foaled: March 22, 1995
- Country: United States
- Colour: Bay
- Breeder: Richard S Kaster
- Owner: Richard S Kaster, Donald Propson et al
- Trainer: Carlos A. Garcia; Patrick Byrne; Bill Mott; Mary Jo Lohmeier
- Record: 14: 7-2-0

Major wins
- Schuylerville Stakes (1997); Spinaway Stakes (1997); Alcibiades Stakes (1997); Breeders' Cup Juvenile Fillies (1997)

Awards
- American Champion Two-Year-Old Filly (1997)

Countess Diana (March 22, 1995 – June 2006) was an American Thoroughbred racehorse and broodmare. As a two-year-old in 1997, she dominated the juvenile fillies division in North America, winning five of her six races including the Schuylerville Stakes, Spinaway Stakes, Alcibiades Stakes and Breeders' Cup Juvenile Fillies. At the end of the year she was voted American Champion Two-Year-Old Filly and rated the best American two-year-old filly for more than fifty years. Her subsequent racing career was relatively disappointing: she failed to win in four starts in 1998 before winning two minor races in 1999. After her retirement from racing she had limited success as a broodmare and died in 2006.

== Background ==
Countess Diana was a bay mare bred in Kentucky by Richard S Kaster. She was raised at the Sunny Oak Farm near Paris. Her sire Deerhound never contested a Graded stakes race but had an excellent pedigree, being a son of Danzig out of the broodmare Lassie Dear, whose other descendants have included A.P. Indy, Duke of Marmalade, Summer Squall, Lemon Drop Kid and Wolfhound. Countess Diana's dam T V Countess was a Maryland-bred mare who won four races including the Politely Stakes at Pimlico Race Course. As a granddaughter of the broodmare War Exchange she was closely related to Curlin.

During her racing career, Countess Diana was owned by Kaster with a variety of partners including his wife, Nancy, his sister (also Nancy) and his brother-in-law Donald Propson. The filly was initially sent into training with Carlos A. Garcia.

== Racing career ==
=== 1997: two-year-old season ===
Countess Diana made her track debut in a four and a half furlong maiden race at Pimlico Race Course on June 6, 1997. Ridden by Mark Johnston, she raced in second before taking the lead in the straight and won by half a length from Brac Drifter, with a gap of ten lengths back to the odds-on favorite Epistola in third. Her winning time of 51.5 was a new track record. After the race she was moved to the stable of Patrick Byrne. The filly was moved up in class for the Grade III Debutante Stakes at Churchill Downs three weeks later. Ridden by Shane Sellers she drew clear of her opponents in the straight but was caught in the closing stages and was beaten half a length by Love Lock. On July 23, Countess Diana faced Love Lock again in the Grade II Schuylerville Stakes at Saratoga Race Course. Starting the 2.3/1 second favourite she led from the start and won by two lengths from Love Lock. In August, Countess Diana was moved up in class and distance for the Grade I Spinaway Stakes at the same track. She was made the 1.7/1 favourite against four opponents headed by the Adirondack Stakes winner Salty Perfume. Sellers sent the filly into the lead from the start and she won by six and a half lengths from Brac Drifter.

On 11 October, Countess Diana was matched against the Matron Stakes winner Beautiful Pleasure in the Grade II Alcibiades Stakes over one and one sixteenth of a mile at Keeneland. As in her previous race, she led from the start and drew away in the closing stages to win by two and three quarter lengths from Lily of Gold with the favored Beautiful Pleasure in third. On November 11 Countess Diana started the 2/1 favorite for the fourteenth edition of the Breeders' Cup Juvenile Fillies, which took place that year at Hollywood Park Racetrack. Beautiful Pleasure and Love Lock opposed her again, but her closest rivals in the betting were Career Collection (winner of the Landaluce Stakes and the Sorrento Stakes) and Vivid Angel (Del Mar Debutante Stakes). Ridden as usual by Sellers, she tracked the 32/1 outsider Bay Harbor before moving into the lead half a mile from the finish before drawing away to win by a record margin of eight and a half lengths from Career Collection.

=== 1998: three-year-old season ===
Before the start of the 1998 season, Countess Diana was transferred to the stable of Bill Mott. She made her seasonal debut in the Grade III Nassau Stakes over seven furlongs at Belmont Park on May 13. She started the odds-on favorite but stumbled at the start and was never able to challenge for the lead, finishing second of the four runners behind Jersey Girl. Despite her defeat, Countess Diana started favorite for the Grade I Acorn Stakes over one mile at the same course on June 7, but after showing some early speed she tired and finished fifth of the ten runners, eleven and a half length behind the winner Jersey Girl. She proved no match for Jersey Girl when the fillies met again in the Mother Goose Stakes three weeks later, finishing four and a half lengths behind the winner in fourth. After a two and a half month break, the filly returned in the Grade I Gazelle Handicap at Belmont on September 12 and finished sixth of the seven runners behind Tap to Music.

=== 1999: four-year-old season ===
After a break of eleven months, during which she was moved to the stable of Mary J Lomeiher, Countess Diana returned to the track and recorded her first success since the 1997 Breeders' Cup winning an allowance race over six and a half furlongs at Saratoga, leading from the start and beating Memory Call by five and three quarter lengths. When moved back up to Grade I class for the Ballerina Handicap at the same course three weeks later she started second favorite and showed some early speed but tired and finished ninth of the ten runners behind Furlough. Countess Diana was dropped back in class for an allowance race on turf at Keeneland on October 21. Ridden by Craig Perret, she led from the start and won by three lengths from Tasso's Magic.

== Assessment and awards ==
In the Eclipse Awards for 1997, Countess Diana was named American Champion Two-Year-Old Filly. In the Experimental Free Handicap, a ranking of the best juveniles to race in North America, she was assigned a weight of 125 pounds, the highest awarded to a filly since First Flight in 1946.

== Breeding record ==
Countess Diana produced at least six foals and four winners between 2001 and 2006:

- Grass Gallop, a bay colt, foaled in 2001, sired by Victory Gallop, unraced
- Count Me In, chestnut colt, 2002, by A.P. Indy, unplaced in his only recorded race
- Mama Nadine, bay filly, 2003, by A.P. Indy, won two races including the Little Silver Stakes at Monmouth Park
- Counselled, dark bay or brown colt, 2004, by A.P. Indy, won two minor races
- King of California, dark bay or brown colt, 2005, by Gone West, won one race
- Subtle Hunter, bay gelding, 2006, by Elusive Quality, won seven races

Countess Diana was euthanized in June 2006 at Rood and Riddle Equine Hospital near Lexington, Kentucky.

== Pedigree ==
Pedigree of Countess Diana (USA), bay mare, 1995
Sire Deerhound (USA) 1988	Danzig (USA); 1977	Northern Dancer	Nearctic
Sire Deerhound (USA) 1988	Danzig (USA); 1977	Northern Dancer	Natalma
Sire Deerhound (USA) 1988	Danzig (USA); 1977	Pas de Nom	Admiral's Voyage
Sire Deerhound (USA) 1988	Danzig (USA); 1977	Pas de Nom	Petitioner
Sire Deerhound (USA) 1988	Lassie Dear (USA); 1974	Buckpasser	Tom Fool
Sire Deerhound (USA) 1988	Lassie Dear (USA); 1974	Buckpasser	Busanda
Sire Deerhound (USA) 1988	Lassie Dear (USA); 1974	Gay Missile	Sir Gaylord
Sire Deerhound (USA) 1988	Lassie Dear (USA); 1974	Gay Missile	Missy Baba
Dam T V Countess (USA) 1985	T V Commercial (USA); 1965	T V Lark	Indian Hemp
Dam T V Countess (USA) 1985	T V Commercial (USA); 1965	T V Lark	Miss Larksfly
Dam T V Countess (USA) 1985	T V Commercial (USA); 1965	Your Hostess	Alibhai
Dam T V Countess (USA) 1985	T V Commercial (USA); 1965	Your Hostess	Miss Boudoir
Dam T V Countess (USA) 1985	Count On Kathy (USA); 1978	Dancing Count	Northern Dancer
Dam T V Countess (USA) 1985	Count On Kathy (USA); 1978	Dancing Count	Snow Court
Dam T V Countess (USA) 1985	Count On Kathy (USA); 1978	War Exchange	Wise Exchange
Dam T V Countess (USA) 1985	Count On Kathy (USA); 1978	War Exchange	Jungle War (Family: 19-c)
