= Stephen A. DiMauro =

American horse trainer (1932–2020)

Personal information
- Born: November 29, 1932 Camden, New Jersey
- Died: May 20, 2020 (aged 87)
- Resting place: Holy Cross Cemetery; Mays Landing, New Jersey
- Occupation: Jockey/Trainer

Horse racing career
- Sport: Horse racing
- Career wins: 1,159

Major racing wins
- Remsen Stakes (1962); Westchester Handicap (1964); Astarita Stakes (1965); Coaching Club American Oaks (1966); Mother Goose Stakes (1966); Delaware Oaks (1966); Acorn Stakes (1970, 1976); Comely Stakes (1970, 1979); Distaff Handicap (1972, 1974); Firenze Handicap (1972); Vagrancy Handicap (1973, 1981, 1990); Delaware Handicap (1974); New York Breeders' Futurity (1974); Arlington-Washington Lassie Stakes (1975); Astoria Stakes (1975); Colleen Stakes (1975); Fashion Stakes (1975); Governor Stakes (1975); Marlboro Cup (1975); Monmouth Handicap (1975); Sorority Stakes (1975); Spinaway Stakes (1975); Travers Stakes (1975); Fountain of Youth Stakes (1976); Orchid Handicap (1976); Prioress Stakes (1976); Withers Stakes (1976); El Encino Stakes (1977); Malibu Stakes (1977); Peter Pan Stakes (1977); Long Island Handicap (1980, 1981); Sheepshead Bay Stakes (1980, 1982, 1988); Black Helen Handicap (1981); Knickerbocker Handicap (1981); Morven Stakes (1981); Santa Barbara Handicap (1981); Providencia Stakes (1982); Florida Derby (1983); Royal Palm Handicap (1983); Rothmans International Stakes (1985); Dixie Handicap (1985); Ladies Handicap (1987); Bayakoa Handicap (1988); Matriarch Stakes (1988)

Racing awards
- Eclipse Award for Outstanding Trainer (1975)

Significant horses
- Lady Pitt, Dearly Precious, Nassipour, Wajima

Stephen A. "Steve" DiMauro (November 29, 1932 – May 20, 2020) was a jockey, Champion trainer and successful breeder and owner in American Thoroughbred horse racing.

A native of Camden, New Jersey, in 1952 DiMauro was an apprentice jockey riding at racetracks in Florida and the New York area. Ten years later he began making his mark in the industry as a trainer, earning his first New York stakes race win on November 28, 1962 in the Remsen Stakes at Aqueduct Racetrack. In his early years conditioning Thoroughbreds, DiMauro had considerable success with horses belonging to the Golden Triangle Stables of Pittsburgh, Pennsylvania businessman, Tom Eazor. Among their successes was with the filly Lady Pitt who was voted the 1966 American Champion Three-Year-Old Filly. For other owners, DiMauro would train two more Champions during his career, both coming in 1975. That year, Dearly Precious earned American Champion Two-Year-Old Filly honors and Wajima was voted the American Champion Three-Year-Old Male Horse. In 1975, DiMauro was voted the Eclipse Award for Outstanding Trainer. He bred numerous winners including two New York Bred Champions. He also received the award for the New York State Broodmare of the Year and was presented with the New York Breeder of the Year award in 1986. As part of his breeding and training programs he was part owner (with Harold Syner of Wajima fame) of Alamare Farm in Lexington, Kentucky and joint owner of Meadow Wood Training Center in Ocala, Florida.

DiMauro mentored several individuals involved in Thoroughbred racing, including jockey Richard Migliore and trainers Dominic Galluscio and Karen Shiels. Migliore went on to have a professional riding career until his retirement in June 2010. Galluscio established himself as a trainer on the New York racing circuit, while Shiels trained several stakes-winning horses, including Menifee, who finished second in both the 1999 Kentucky Derby and Preakness Stakes.

In addition to his training and breeding activities, DiMauro served on the boards of the New York Horsemen's Benevolent and Protective Association, the New York Backstretch Pension Fund, Breeder's Cup Ltd., and the New York Thoroughbred Breeding Fund, where he served as president in 1982 and 1983.

Because of the multitude of accomplishments over a large number of years, Stephen DiMauro was nominated to the U.S. Racing Hall of Fame in February 2012. DiMauro was retired and resided in Florida with his wife Kathryn. His son, Stephen L. DiMauro has followed in his footsteps.
