= Sorority Stakes =

- Class: Ungraded Stakes
- Location: Monmouth Park Racetrack; Oceanport, New Jersey, United States
- Inaugurated: 1956
- Race type: Thoroughbred – Flat racing
- Website: www.monmouthpark.com

Race information
- Distance: 6 furlongs
- Surface: Dirt
- Track: left-handed
- Qualification: Two-year-old fillies
- Weight: Assigned
- Purse: US$100,000 (2016)

The Sorority Stakes is an American Thoroughbred horse race held annually during the first week of September at Monmouth Park Racetrack in Oceanport, New Jersey. Open to two-year-old fillies, it is contested on dirt over a distance of six furlongs.

The Sorority Stakes lost its graded status in 2004.

== Records ==
Speed record:

- 1:09.00 Ruffian (1974)

Most wins by a jockey:

- 3 – Braulio Baeza (1967, 1968, 1973)
- 3 – Joe Bravo(1999, 2009, 2020)

Most wins by a trainer:

- 3 – Ben W. Perkins Jr. (2000, 2001, 2002)

Most wins by an owner:

- 3 – Wheatley Stable (1961, 1963, 1968)

== Winners ==
Year	Winner	Age	Jockey	Trainer	Owner	Dist. (Miles) (Furlongs)	Time
2024	Social Fortress	2	Jaime Rodriguez	Jamie Ness	Joseph M. Imbesi	1 m	1:40.05
2023	Princess Indy	2	Carlos Eduardo Rojas	Claudio A. Gonzalez	Valter Ramos	1 m	1:41.72
2022	Vedareo	2	Frankie Pennington	Butch Reid	Swilcan Stable	1 m	1:38.43
2021	Runup	2	Joseph Ramos	Laura Wohlers	James McIngvale	1 m	1:39.32
2020	Mischievous Dream	2	Joe Bravo	Christophe Clement	Patricia Generazio	1 m	1:38.98
2019	Micheline	2	Nik Juarez	Michael H. Stidham	Godolphin	1 m	1:37.19
2018	Decorated Ace	2	Hector R. Diaz Jr.	Brenda D. McCarthy	Brenda D. McCarthy	1 m	1:37.36
2017	Pacific Gale	2	Chris DeCarlo	John C. Kimmel	Tobey L. Morton	6 f	1:10.54
2016	Made Me Shiver	2	Antonio A. Gallardo	Steve Asmussen	Hill 'n' Dale Equine Holdings, Inc. (J. G. Sikura) & Joel Quenneville	6 f	1:11.25
2015	Hi Holiday	2	Trevor McCarthy	Joseph F. Orseno	D. J. Stable LLC (Leonard Green)	6 f	1:12.40
2014	Concealedwithakiss	2	Angel Serpa	Edward Plesa Jr.	Laurie Plesa & Vincent Rizzuto	6 f	1:11.41
2013	Miss Behavior	2	Garry Cruise	Phil Schoenthal	Cal MacWilliam & Neil Teitelbaum	6 f	1:11.54
2012	Doubled	2	Ángel Arroyo	Cathal Lynch	Nancy Shuford	6 f	1:11.88
2011	Gypsy Robin	2	Jeffrey Sanchez	Wesley A. Ward	King 9 Stables LLC & Wesley A. Ward et al.	6 f	110.98
2010	Unbridled Praise	2	Miguel Mena	W. Bret Calhoun	Richard L. Davis	6 f	1:12.48
2009	Truth and Justice	2	Joe Bravo	Kelly J. Breen	George & Lori Hall	6 f	1:09.99
2008	Selva	2	Eddie Castro	David M. Carroll	Helen C. Alexander & Helen K. Groves	6 f	1:10.63
2007	A Little Gem	2	Jose Lezcano	Steve Margolis	Martin L. Cherry	6 f	1:11.72
2006	Our Fantene	2	Eddie Castro	Cathal Lynch	Gunsmith Stables (Bo Smith)	6 f	1:10.45
2005	Keeneland Kat	2	Stewart Elliott	Kelly J. Breen	George & Lori Hall	6 f	1:11.23
2004	Queens Plaza	2	Stewart Elliott	Thomas M. Bush	Candy Stables (Herbert & Ellen Moelis)	6 f	1:11.73
2003	Feline Story	2	José C. Ferrer	Stanley M. Hough	E. Paul Robsham	6 f	1:10.93
2002	Wild Snitch	2	Eibar Coa	Ben W. Perkins Jr.	New Farm Stable	6 f	1:11.09
2001	Forest Heiress	2	Dale Beckner	Ben W. Perkins Jr.	New Farm Stable	6 f	1:11.61
2000	Stormy Pick	2	José C. Ferrer	Ben W. Perkins Jr.	Raymond Dweck	6 f	1:10.96
1999	Sister Fiona	2	Joe Bravo	Martin D. Wolfson	Cloverleaf Farm II, Inc.	6 f	1:09.60
1998	Appealing Phylly	2	Chuck C. Lopez	Thomas R. Bowden	John Burness	6 f	1:10.20
1997	Unky and Ally	2	Jose R. Martinez Jr.	Peter Fortay	Dennis A. Drazin	6 f	1:11.40
1996	Annie Cake	2	Herb McCauley	Virgil W. Raines	Anderson Fowler	6 f	1:11.60
1995	Crafty But Sweet	2	Nick Santagata	Robert Barbara	Rosee Moira, 'et al.	6 f	1:10.80
1994	Stormy Blues	2	Julie Krone	Flint S. Schulhofer	H & D Stable (Harriet & David Finklestein)	6 f	1:11.00
1993	Cat Attack	2	Robbie Davis	David Monaci	Lillian Durst	6 f	1:11.40
1992	Hollywood Wildcat	2	Fabio Arguello Jr.	Emmanuel Tortora	Irving & Marjorie Cowan	6 f	1:10.80
1991	Fluttery Danseur	2	Martin Pedroza	Brian A. Mayberry	Siegel family	6 f	1:10.60
1990	Good Potential	2	Earlie Fires	Thomas F. Proctor	Glen Hill Farm	6 f	1:11.40
1989	Fuerza	2	Robert Colton	Robert W. Camac	Gerard Gallo	6 f	1:11.60
1988	Divine Answer	2	Rick Wilson	John F. Mazza	C. & K. Lenz	6 f	1:11.80
1987	Blue Jean Baby	2	Chris McCarron	D. Wayne Lukas	Eugene V. Klein	6 f	1:10.20
1986	Delicate Vine	2	Gary Stevens	Robert J. Frankel	Jerry Moss	6 f	1:09.60
1985	Lazer Show	2	Chris Antley	Don Winfree	James J. Devaney	6 f	1:10.40
1984	Tiltalating	2	Pat Valenzuela	D. Wayne Lukas	Eugene V. Klein	6 f	1:10.80
1983	Officer's Ball	2	Craig Perret	LeRoy Jolley	Peter M. Brant	6 f	1:11.80
1982	Singing Susan	2	Bill Passmore	Bernard P. Bond	Robert Quinichett	6 f	1:11.60
1981	Apalachee Honey	2	Michael Morgan	Tim Muckler	Dan Muckler Stables	6 f	1:12.40
1980	Fancy Naskra	2	Larry Snyder	Jerry Calvin	James Q. Thomas	6 f	1:12.00
1979	Love Street	2	Jorge Tejeira	Gordon R. Potter	Dan Lasater	6 f	1:11.40
1978	Mongo Queen	2	Wayne Rice	Clyde Rice	George Roboski	6 f	1:10.60
1977	Stub	2	Ron Turcotte	James E. Picou	Marge Schott	6 f	1:11.20
1976	Squander	2	Ángel Cordero Jr.	John W. Russell	Ogden Mills Phipps	6 f	1:10.80
1975	Dearly Precious	2	Michael Hole	Stephen A. DiMauro	Richard E. Bailey	6 f	1:10.40
1974	Ruffian	2	Jacinto Vásquez	Frank Whiteley Jr.	Locust Hill Farm	6 f	1:09.00
1973	Irish Sonnet	2	Braulio Baeza	Budd Lepman	Crown Stable (Ollie Cohen)	6 f	1:10.40
1972	Sparkalark	2	Ángel Cordero Jr.	LeRoy Jolley	Chance Hill Farm	6 f	1:11.00
1971	Brenda Beauty	2	Robert Woodhouse	Robert Lake	Birchfield Farm (Herbert Palestine)	6 f	1:10.00
1970	Forward Gal	2	Frank Iannelli	Warren A. Croll Jr.	Aisco Stable	6 f	1:11.60
1969	Box the Compass	2	Jacinto Vásquez	Thomas J. Kelly	Brookmeade Stable	6 f	1:12.00
1968	Big Advance	2	Braulio Baeza	Edward A. Neloy	Wheatley Stable	6 f	1:11.00
1967	Queen of the Stage	2	Braulio Baeza	Edward A. Neloy	Ogden Phipps	6 f	1:10.00
1966	Like A Charm	2	Jorge Velásquez	Warren A. Croll Jr.	Mrs. W. A. Croll Jr.	6 f	1:12.60
1965	Native Street	2	Manuel Ycaza	Les Lear	Aisco Stable	6 f	1:10.40
1964	Bold Experience	2	Robert Ussery	Casey Hayes	Meadow Stable	6 f	1:09.60
1963	Castle Forbes	2	Bill Hartack	William C. Winfrey	Wheatley Stable	6 f	1:11.60
1962	Affectionately	2	Ismael Valenzuela	John W. Jacobs	Ethel D. Jacobs	6 f	1:10.00
1961	Batter Up	2	Hedley Woodhouse	James Fitzsimmons	Wheatley Stable	6 f	1:12.00
1960	Apatontheback	2	Ray Broussard	Clyde Troutt	Ada L. Rice	6 f	1:11.60
1959	Evening Glow	2	Howard Grant	Bert Mulholland	Jessie Widener	6 f	1:12.20
1958	Mommy Dear	2	Sam Boulmetis Sr.	C. W. Parish	Circle M Farm (Edward S. Moore)	6 f	1:13.40
1957	Bridgework	2	Eric Guerin	George M. Odom	Josephine Bigelow	6 f	1:12.80
1956	Marullah	2	William Boland	Sidney J. Smith	John S. Kroese	6 f	1:10.40
