= Native Charger =

American Thoroughbred racehorse

- Sire: Native Dancer
- Grandsire: Polynesian
- Dam: Greek Blond
- Damsire: Heliopolis
- Sex: Stallion
- Foaled: 1962
- Country: United States
- Colour: Gray
- Breeder: Hubert B. Phipps
- Owner: Warner Stable
- Trainer: Raymond F. Metcalf
- Record: 20: 5-5-2
- Earnings: $278,893

Major wins
- Tyro Stakes (1964); Flamingo Stakes (1965); Florida Derby (1965)

Native Charger was an American-bred Thoroughbred racehorse and son of Champion Thoroughbred Native Dancer that competed in the 1965 Kentucky Derby and Preakness Stakes after winning two prep races that same year.

Native Charger, like his sire, was a gray, speckled colt bred by Hubert B. Phipps and owned by the Warner Stable of Hollywood film mogul Albert Warner. His dam, Greek Blond, finished in the money in 19 of 25 starts. He was a half-brother to noted sire Raise a Native and Dancer's Image, who crossed the line first in the 1968 Kentucky Derby but was disqualified.

== Racing record ==
Native Charger ran frequently as a 2-year-old with limited success, winning only three times in 13 starts. One of those wins was in the Tyro Stakes at Monmouth Park. Like his sire, he closed quickly over the tiring favorite, Golden Joey, and beat Time Tested by a half length. The time was 1:03 3/5, only one‐fifth of a second slower than the track record.

As a 3-year-old, Native Charger surprised horse racing fans with a win in the Flamingo Stakes, defeating Sparkling Johnny by a half length. Staying in Florida, he repeated his performance by winning the Florida Derby by a neck over Hail To All. His victories thrust him into the Kentucky Derby spotlight, where he was considered one of the favorites behind Bold Lad, but finished second in his final Derby tuneup, the Stepping Stone one week before the Derby. He was blocked by horses in the backstretch and had to angle out to find running room, losing ground. He finished 1 3/4 lengths behind Tom Rolfe.

In the Kentucky Derby, Native Charger was bumped early by Narushua, but recovered and managed to finish fourth behind winner Lucky Debonair. He ran in the Preakness two weeks later, and the result was the same, as he finished fourth, this time behind Tom Rolfe. In uncharacteristic fashion, Native Charger went for the lead early but faded in the stretch. He bowed a tendon in the race, ending his career. He finished the year with two wins, one second and one third in seven starts, and ended his career with 5 wins, 5 seconds and 2 thirds in 20 starts.

== Stud record ==
When he retired, Native Charger stood at Mare Haven Farm in Ocala, Fla. for a fee of $5,000. He sired 1970 American Champion Two-Year-Old Filly Forward Gal and 1970 Belmont Stakes winner High Echelon. He was also damsire of 1982 Preakness Stakes winner Aloma's Ruler.

== Pedigree ==
Pedigree of Native Charger, gray horse, 1962
Sire Native Dancer Gr. 1949	Polynesian; B. 1935	Unbreakable; B. 1935	Sickle (GB); Br. 1924
Sire Native Dancer Gr. 1949	Polynesian; B. 1935	Unbreakable; B. 1935	Blue Glass (FR); Br. 1917
Sire Native Dancer Gr. 1949	Polynesian; B. 1935	Black Dolly; B. 1936	Polymelian (GB); Ch. 1914
Sire Native Dancer Gr. 1949	Polynesian; B. 1935	Black Dolly; B. 1936	Black Queen; Blk/Br. 1930
Sire Native Dancer Gr. 1949	Geisha; B. 1943	Discovery; Ch. 1927	Display; B. 1923
Sire Native Dancer Gr. 1949	Geisha; B. 1943	Discovery; Ch. 1927	Ariadne; Br. 1926
Sire Native Dancer Gr. 1949	Geisha; B. 1943	Miyako; Gr. 1935	John P. Grier; Ch. 1917
Sire Native Dancer Gr. 1949	Geisha; B. 1943	Miyako; Gr. 1935	La Chica; Gr. 1930
Dam Greek Blond B. 1946	Heliopolis; Br. 1936	Hyperion (GB); Ch. 1930	Gainsborough (GB); B. 1915
Dam Greek Blond B. 1946	Heliopolis; Br. 1936	Hyperion (GB); Ch. 1930	Selene (GB); B. 1919
Dam Greek Blond B. 1946	Heliopolis; Br. 1936	Drift (FR); B. 1926	Swynford (GB); Br. 1907
Dam Greek Blond B. 1946	Heliopolis; Br. 1936	Drift (FR); B. 1926	Santa Cruz (GB); Ch. 1916
Dam Greek Blond B. 1946	Peroxide; Br. 1937	High Quest; B. 1931	Sir Gallahad (FR); B. 1920
Dam Greek Blond B. 1946	Peroxide; Br. 1937	High Quest; B. 1931	Etoile Filante; Ch. 1918
Dam Greek Blond B. 1946	Peroxide; Br. 1937	Blonde Bell; Ch. 1932	North Star (GB); Ch. 1914
Dam Greek Blond B. 1946	Peroxide; Br. 1937	Blonde Bell; Ch. 1932	Beaming Beauty; B. 1917

== See also ==
- Native Dancer
