= 1965 Kentucky Derby =

Horse race

91st Kentucky Derby
- Kentucky Derby
- Grade I stakes race
- Location: Churchill Downs
- Date: May 1, 1965
- Winning horse: Lucky Debonair
- Jockey: Bill Shoemaker
- Trainer: Frank Catrone
- Owner: Ada L. Rice Racing Stable
- Surface: Dirt

The 1965 Kentucky Derby was the 91st running of the Kentucky Derby. The race took place on May 1, 1965.

== Full results ==
Finished	Post	Horse	Jockey	Trainer	Owner	Time / behind
1st	8	Lucky Debonair	Bill Shoemaker	Frank Catrone	Ada L. Rice Racing Stable	2:01.20
2nd	1	Dapper Dan	Ismael Valenzuela	William C. Winfrey	Ogden Phipps	
3rd	9	Tom Rolfe	Ron Turcotte	Frank Y. Whiteley Jr.	Powhatan Stable	
4th	4	Native Charger	John L. Rotz	Raymond F. Metcalf	Warner Stable	
5th	7	Hail To All	Manuel Ycaza	Edward J. Yowell	Zelda Cohen	
6th	10	Mr. Pak	Jimmy Nichols	Mary D. Keim	Mary D. Keim	
7th	11	Swift Ruler	Larry Spraker	Gin L. Collins	Earl Allen	
8th	5	Flag Raiser	Bobby Ussery	Hirsch Jacobs	Isidor Bieber	
9th	6	Carpenter's Rule	William Harmatz	Frank E. Childs	Perne L. Grissom	
10th	3	Bold Lad	Bill Hartack	William C. Winfrey	Wheatley Stable	
11th	2	Narushua	Terrance Dunlavy	G. R. Oakes	John W. Mecom Sr.	
