= Dream Empress =

American thoroughbred racehorse

- Sire: Bernstein
- Grandsire: Storm Cat
- Dam: Chinese Empress
- Damsire: Nijinsky
- Sex: Mare
- Foaled: 2006
- Country: USA
- Breeder: Hopewell Investments, LLC, Glencrest Farm & Bryan Cross
- Owner: Livin the Dream Racing LLC
- Trainer: Kenneth G. McPeek
- Record: 10: 2-1-1
- Earnings: $763,154

Major wins
- Alcibiades Stakes (2008)

Dream Empress (foaled March 22, 2006 in Kentucky) is an American Thoroughbred racehorse who won the 2008 Alcibiades Stakes .

== Career ==
Dream Empress' first race was on July 17, 2008, at Ellis Park Race Course, where she finished 4th. Her second race at Saratoga Race Course on August 22, 2008, was the first win of her career.

On October 3, 2008, she won the biggest race of her career at the Grade I Alcibiades Stakes. This proved to be the last win of her career.

She continued to compete through 2008, 2009 and 2010 with her final race being on February 14, 2010, at the Grade II La Cañada Stakes, where she finished 6th. She was then sold to Big Red Farm, LLC in January 2018.

== Pedigree ==
Pedigree of Dream Empress (USA), 2006
Sire Bernstein(USA) 1997	Storm Cat (USA); 1983	Storm Bird (CAN)	Northern Dancer
Sire Bernstein(USA) 1997	Storm Cat (USA); 1983	Storm Bird (CAN)	South Ocean
Sire Bernstein(USA) 1997	Storm Cat (USA); 1983	Terlingua (USA)	Secretariat
Sire Bernstein(USA) 1997	Storm Cat (USA); 1983	Terlingua (USA)	Crimson Saint
Sire Bernstein(USA) 1997	La Affirmed(USA); 1983	Affirmed (USA)	Exclusive Native
Sire Bernstein(USA) 1997	La Affirmed(USA); 1983	Affirmed (USA)	Won't Tell You
Sire Bernstein(USA) 1997	La Affirmed(USA); 1983	La Mesa (USA)	Round Table
Sire Bernstein(USA) 1997	La Affirmed(USA); 1983	La Mesa (USA)	Finance
Dam Chinese Empress(USA) 1989	Nijinsky (CAN); 1967	Northern Dancer (USA)	Nearctic
Dam Chinese Empress(USA) 1989	Nijinsky (CAN); 1967	Northern Dancer (USA)	Natalma
Dam Chinese Empress(USA) 1989	Nijinsky (CAN); 1967	Flaming Page (CAN)	Bull Page
Dam Chinese Empress(USA) 1989	Nijinsky (CAN); 1967	Flaming Page (CAN)	Flaring Top
Dam Chinese Empress(USA) 1989	Execution(USA); 1975	The Axe (USA)	Mahmoud
Dam Chinese Empress(USA) 1989	Execution(USA); 1975	The Axe (USA)	Blackball
Dam Chinese Empress(USA) 1989	Execution(USA); 1975	House of Cards (USA)	Promised Land
Dam Chinese Empress(USA) 1989	Execution(USA); 1975	House of Cards (USA)	Carolwood
