= Benjamin W. Perkins Jr. =

American horse trainer

Ben Perkins Jr.
Personal information
- Born: March 10, 1956 (age 70) Camden, New Jersey, United States
- Occupation: Trainer

Horse racing career
- Sport: Horse racing
- Career wins: 1,501 (as at 2019-02-13)

Major racing wins
- Great American Stakes (1981); Bonnie Miss Stakes (1988); Forward Gal Stakes (1988); Garden State Stakes (1989, 1991); Fred "Cappy" Capossela Stakes (1990, 2000, 2001, 2002); Delaware Handicap (1991); Molly Pitcher Stakes (1991); Federico Tesio Stakes (1993); Fountain of Youth Stakes (1993); Sapling Stakes (1993); Wood Memorial Stakes (1993); Salvator Mile Handicap (1994); Chick Lang Stakes (1995, 1999, 2000, 2011); Arlington Sprint Handicap (1996); Laurel Dash Stakes (1998); Aegon Turf Sprint Stakes (1999); Nashua Stakes (1999); Woodford Stakes (1999, 2002); Sorority Stakes (2000, 2001, 2002); Spinaway Stakes (2000); Longfellow Stakes (2000, 2001, 2003, 2006); West Virginia Derby (2000); Colleen Stakes (2001); De Francis Memorial Dash Stakes (2001, 2004); Forego Handicap (2001); Gotham Stakes (2001); Withers Stakes (2001); Maryland Million Distaff Handicap (2002); Safely Kept Stakes (2006); Maryland Million Oaks (2009)

Racing awards
- Monmouth Park Champion trainer (2000)

Benjamin W. Perkins Jr. (born March 10, 1956, in Camden, New Jersey) is an American trainer of Thoroughbred racehorses. A graduate of the University of Pennsylvania's Wharton School of Business, he is the son of Benjamin W. Perkins who conditioned racehorses for close to fifty years.

In 1981, Perkins won his first race at Atlantic City Race Course.
