= Dearly Precious =

American-bred Thoroughbred racehorse

- Dearly Precious's grave at Claiborne Farm
- Sire: Dr. Fager
- Grandsire: Rough'n Tumble
- Dam: Imsodear
- Damsire: Chieftain
- Sex: Mare
- Foaled: 1973
- Country: United States
- Colour: Bay
- Breeder: Jean R. Pancoast
- Owner: Richard E. Bailey
- Trainer: Stephen A. DiMauro
- Record: 16: 12-2-1
- Earnings: US$370,465

Major wins
- Arlington-Washington Lassie Stakes (1975); Astoria Stakes (1975); Colleen Stakes (1975); Fashion Stakes (1975); Sorority Stakes (1975); Spinaway Stakes (1975); Polly Drummond Stakes (1975); Acorn Stakes (1976); Prioress Stakes (1976); Flirtation Stakes (1976); Dark Mirage Stakes (1976)

Awards
- American Champion Two-Year-Old Filly (1975)

Honours
- Dearly Precious Stakes at Aqueduct Racetrack

Dearly Precious (1973–1992) was an American Champion Thoroughbred racehorse.

== Background ==
Bred in Florida by Mrs. Jean R. Pancoast, she was out of the mare Imsodear and sired by U.S. Racing Hall of Fame inductee Dr. Fager. Richard E. Bailey, a cable television executive, purchased her as a yearling for $22,000 and entrusted her race conditioning to Stephen A. DiMauro.

== Racing career ==
On the way to being voted the Eclipse Award as 1975's American Champion Two-Year-Old Filly, Dearly Precious won eight of her nine starts. Her wins included important races for her age group under regular jockey Michael Hole, such the Arlington-Washington Lassie Stakes, Astoria Stakes, and the Spinaway Stakes. As a three-year-old, Dearly Precious won her April 4, 1976 debut in the Flirtation Stakes at Baltimore's Pimlico Race Course. On April 25, she won her tenth straight race, capturing the Prioress Stakes at Aqueduct Racetrack. On May 5, Dearly Precious lost by half a length to Tell Me All in the Comely Handicap, then on May 14 she was beaten by a nose in the Black-Eyed Susan Stakes, handicapped by ten more pounds than the winner, What A Summer. On May 22, she came back to win the first leg of the Filly Triple Crown, the Acorn Stakes.

== Injury and retirement ==
Rested after her tough win over Optimistic Gal in the Acorn Stakes, Dearly Precious was in the hunt for another annual Championship when she suffered a bowed tendon in her left foreleg on July 11, 1976 while winning the Dark Mirage Stakes at Aqueduct Racetrack. Her racing career over, Dearly Precious retired having won twelve of her sixteen starts, and eventually served as a broodmare. Her offspring met with limited success in racing, the best of which was a mating to Nijinsky that produced stakes winner Mister Modesty.

== Pedigree ==
Pedigree of Dearly Precious
Sire Dr. Fager	Rough'n Tumble	Free For all	Questionnaire
Sire Dr. Fager	Rough'n Tumble	Free For all	Panay
Sire Dr. Fager	Rough'n Tumble	Roused	Bull Dog
Sire Dr. Fager	Rough'n Tumble	Roused	Rude Awakening
Sire Dr. Fager	Aspidistra	Better Self	Bimelech
Sire Dr. Fager	Aspidistra	Better Self	Bee Mac
Sire Dr. Fager	Aspidistra	Tilly Rose	Bull Brier
Sire Dr. Fager	Aspidistra	Tilly Rose	Tilly Kate
Dam Imsodear	Chieftain	Bold Ruler	Nasrullah
Dam Imsodear	Chieftain	Bold Ruler	Miss Disco
Dam Imsodear	Chieftain	Pocahontas	Roman
Dam Imsodear	Chieftain	Pocahontas	How
Dam Imsodear	Ironically	Intent	War Relic
Dam Imsodear	Ironically	Intent	Liz F.
Dam Imsodear	Ironically	Itsabet	Heliopolis
Dam Imsodear	Ironically	Itsabet	Jayjean
