= 1965 Preakness Stakes =

90th running of the Preakness Stakes

90th Preakness Stakes
- The Preakness Stakes
- Location: Pimlico Race Course, Baltimore, Maryland, United States
- Date: May 15, 1965
- Winning horse: Tom Rolfe
- Jockey: Ron Turcotte
- Conditions: Fast
- Surface: Dirt

The 1965 Preakness Stakes was the 90th running of the $200,000 Preakness Stakes thoroughbred horse race. The race took place on May 15, 1965, and was televised in the United States on the CBS television network. Tom Rolfe, who was jockeyed by Ron Turcotte, won the race by a scant neck over runner-up Dapper Dan. Approximate post time was 5:48 p.m. Eastern Time. The race was run on a fast track in a final time of 1:56-1/5. The Maryland Jockey Club reported total attendance of 38,108, this is recorded as second highest on the list of American thoroughbred racing top attended events for North America in 1965.

== Payout ==
The 90th Preakness Stakes Payout Schedule

Program Number	Horse Name	Win	Place	Show
6	Tom Rolfe	$9.20	$5.00	$3.80
8	Dapper Dan	-	$7.20	$4.60
9	Hail To All	-	-	$5.60

== The full chart ==
Finish Position	Margin (lengths)	Post Position	Horse name	Jockey	Trainer	Owner	Post Time Odds	Purse Earnings
1st	0	6	Tom Rolfe	Ron Turcotte	Frank Whiteley	Powhatan Stable	3.60-1	$128,100
2nd	neck	8	Dapper Dan	Ismael Valenzuela	William C. Winfrey	Ogden Phipps	7.40-1	$30,000
3rd	41/4	9	Hail To All	John Sellers	Edward J. Yowell	Mrs. Ben Cohen	9.30-1	$15,000
4th	41/2	4	Native Charger	John L. Rotz	Raymond F. Metcalf	Warner Stable	6.10-1	$7,500
5th	5	2	Swift Ruler	Kenny Knapp	Gin L. Collins	Earl Allen	42.30-1	
6th	6	5	Selari	Howard Grant	Harold Young	Valley Farms	44.40-1	
7th	15	7	Lucky Debonair	Bill Shoemaker	Frank Catrone	Ada L. Rice	1.60-1 favorite	
8th	153/4	3	Needles' Count	Eldon Coffman	Les Lear	Abraham I. Savin	85.70-1	
9th	213/4	1	Flag Raiser	Robert Ussery	Hirsch Jacobs	Isidor Bieber	5.50-1	

- Winning Breeder: Raymond R. Guest; (KY)
- Winning Time: 1:56 1/5
- Track Condition: Fast
- Total Attendance: 38,108
