= Sky Beauty =

American Thoroughbred racehorse

- Sire: Blushing Groom
- Dam: Maplejinsky
- Damsire: Nijinsky
- Sex: Mare
- Foaled: 1990
- Country: USA
- Colour: Bay
- Breeder: Susan & Howard Kaskel
- Owner: Georgia E. Hofmann
- Trainer: H. Allen Jerkens
- Record: 21: 15-2-2
- Earnings: $1,336,000

Major wins
- Matron Stakes (1992); Adirondack Stakes (1992); Acorn Stakes (1993); Mother Goose Stakes (1993); Coaching Club American Oaks (1993); Alabama Stakes (1993); Rare Perfume Stakes (1993); Ruffian Handicap (1994); Shuvee Handicap (1994); Hempstead Handicap (1994); Go For Wand Handicap (1994); Vagrancy Handicap (1994, 1995)

Awards
- 8th U.S. Filly Triple Crown Champion (1993); U.S. Champion Older Female Horse (1994)

Honours
- Sky Beauty Stakes at Aqueduct Racetrack; US Racing Hall of Fame (2011)
- Last updated on April 23, 2017

Sky Beauty (February 9, 1990–July 2, 2004) was a thoroughbred horse who won the 1993 Triple Tiara of Thoroughbred Racing. As of 2026, she was the last filly to win this title.

== Background ==
Georgia E. Hofmann, who owned Wycombe House Stud, bought Sky Beauty for $355,000 at the 1991 Saratoga yearling sale from her breeders, Howard and Susan Kaskel of Sugar Maple Farm. The acquisition served as a sort of homecoming because Hofmann and her late husband, Philip, had bred Sky Beauty's dam, Maplejinsky (by Nijinsky II). Maplejinsky was sold to the Kaskels for $750,000 and was then trained by Philip G. Johnson. She scored her biggest win in the 1988 Alabama Stakes for Susan Kaskel. When she was bred to Blushing Groom (a French stallion by Red God out of Runaway Bride), Maplejinsky produced Sky Beauty. The Hofmanns, who bought the daughter of the filly they had sold to the Kaskels, also bred and raced Maplejinsky's dam, homebred Gold Beauty, the 1982 winner of the Eclipse Award for Outstanding Sprint Horse.

== Triple Tiara ==
Now owned by the breeders of her dam and her grand-dam, Sky Beauty was trained by the "Giant Killer," H. Allen Jerkens. As a 2-year-old, she won the Grade I Matron Stakes and the Grade II Adirondack Stakes. She finished first in the Grade I Spinaway Stakes but was disqualified and placed third. In 1993–94, the filly dominated the New York distaff scene as a 3- and 4-year-old. She won 10 graded stakes races, eight of which were Grade I events. She took the three Grade I races that made up the former Triple Tiara—the Acorn Stakes and Mother Goose Stakes and the Coaching Club American Oaks. Additionally, she won the Grade I Alabama Stakes and the Grade II Rare Perfume Stakes. Sky Beauty seemed destined for a 3-year-old championship but lost out to Hollywood Wildcat after that filly won the Breeders' Cup Distaff at Santa Anita Racetrack.

“She was high strung, tough to handle,” said Jerkens. “She did a lot of things that most really good horses don’t do.”

— Allen Jerkens

At age four, Sky Beauty won the Go For Wand Handicap, Ruffian Handicap, Shuvee Handicap, and Hempstead Handicap (all Grade I races) plus the Grade III Vagrancy Handicap. She failed to live up to expectations in the Breeders' Cup Distaff at Churchill Downs, running unplaced, but accomplished enough to be voted the 1994 Eclipse Award for Outstanding Older Female Horse.

“We had a bond. She was really good with me.”

— Mike Smith

At five, she again won the Vagrancy, and she placed in the Shuvee.

“She was big and strong and powerful, but fairly quick for such a big mare. At one time she carried 130 pounds. It’s amazing how she carried the weight, she was so strong.”

— Mike Smith

== As a broodmare ==
Sky Beauty was retired in 1995 with a record of 15 wins and earnings of $1,336,000. She produced her first three foals for Georgia Hofmann. Then, through Taylor Made Farms, she was sold (in foal to Gone West) for $2,850,000 to John Magnier of Coolmore Stud at the 1999 Keeneland November breeding stock sale.

Sky Beauty produced five named foals, three of which were winners. Her two youngest offspring, a yearling and a weanling, are unnamed colts by Storm Cat. Three of Sky Beauty's offspring fetched high prices, with two yearlings selling for $1.2 million and $500,000, and a weanling selling for $800,000.

Sky Beauty was euthanized at age fourteen on July 2, 2004, at Creekview Farm near Paris, Kentucky, due to complications from laminitis. She initially suffered from founder after delivering her seventh foal (a colt by leading sire Storm Cat) on May 28. Dermot Ryan, manager at Coolmore's Ashford Stud near Versailles, Kentucky, confirmed Sky Beauty's death on July 2, 2004.

Several times, Sky Beauty was nominated to the Racing Hall of Fame, including in the year of her death. She was elected in 2011.

Sky Beauty's great-great-grandson Violence who is a GI winner, first foal to race a filly out of Melody Lady named Buy Sell Hold won a Maiden Special Weight at Keeneland on April 20, 2017.

== Sky Beauty's progeny ==
Bestyoucanbe 1997 horse by Danzig

Storming Beauty 1998 mare by Storm Cat

Sky Legend 1999 mare by Deputy Minister

PVT Lynch 2001 horse by Storm Cat

Desert Tigress 2002 mare by Storm Cat

Hurricane Cat 2003 horse by Storm Cat

Portobello Road 2004 horse by Storm Cat
