= Jimmy Croll =

American horse trainer (1920–2008)

Personal information
- Born: March 9, 1920 Bryn Mawr, Pennsylvania, U.S.
- Died: June 6, 2008 (aged 88) Long Branch, New Jersey, U.S.
- Occupation: Horse trainer

Horse racing career
- Sport: Horse racing
- Career wins: 1,909

Major racing wins
- Longfellow Handicap (1963, 1964); Bougainvillea Handicap (1964, 1965); Long Island Handicap (1964, 1965); Great American Stakes (1967, 1968); Sapling Stakes (1967, 1976, 1986); Haskell Invitational Handicap (1969, 1987, 1994); Sorority Stakes (1970); Frizette Stakes (1970); Spinaway Stakes (1970); Comely Stakes (1971); Gazelle Stakes (1971); Monmouth Oaks (1971, 1978); Gravesend Handicap (1974); Fashion Stakes (1977, 1983); Royal Palm Handicap (1985); Arlington-Washington Futurity Stakes (1986); Laurel Futurity Stakes (1986); Pimlico Special (1988); Arlington-Washington Lassie Stakes (1989); Gallant Man Stakes (1989); Long Branch Breeders' Cup Stakes (1989); Withers Stakes (1990); Woodward Stakes (1994); Vosburgh Stakes (1991); Forego Handicap (1991); Belmont Futurity Stakes (1993); Florida Derby (1994); Hutcheson Stakes (1994); Blue Grass Stakes (1994); Metropolitan Handicap (1994); Dwyer Stakes (1994); Travers Stakes (1994) American Classic Race wins: Belmont Stakes (1987)

Racing awards
- Big Sport of Turfdom Award (1994); Raines Distinguished Achievement Award (1998)

Honours
- United States' Racing Hall of Fame (1994)

Significant horses
- Parka, Mr. Prospector, Forward Gal, Bet Twice, Housebuster, Holy Bull, Al Hattab

Warren A. Croll Jr. (March 9, 1920 – June 6, 2008), best known as Jimmy Croll, was an American Hall of Fame Thoroughbred race horse trainer.

Croll was born in 1920 in Bryn Mawr, Pennsylvania. After finishing high school, he attended the University of Pennsylvania with the intention of becoming a veterinarian but left to pursue his passion for racing Thoroughbreds. In 1940 he obtained his trainers' license but his racing career was interrupted by service with the United States Army in the Pacific Theater of Operations during World War II. Upon the 1946 opening of the new Monmouth Park Racetrack in Oceanport, New Jersey, Croll relocated there and became a permanent part of that facility's annual summer campaign. In 1998, he received Monmouth Park's "Raines Distinguished Achievement Award" given in memory of trainer Virgil W. Raines to an owner or trainer who has shown a dedication to the sport of Thoroughbred racing through exemplary conduct demonstrating professionalism and integrity.

He earned his first graded stakes race win with War Phar in 1951. Although Croll has had a number of good horses, there are several that stand out:

- Parka, the 1965 American Champion Male Turf Horse;
- Forward Gal, the 1970 American Champion Two-Year-Old Filly;
- Bet Twice, multiple graded stakes winner including the Belmont Stakes;
- Housebuster, 1990 and 1991 American Champion Sprint Horse;
- Holy Bull, 1994 American Horse of the Year and a United States Racing Hall of Fame ranked No. 64 in the Blood-Horse magazine List of the Top 100 U.S. Racehorses of the 20th Century.

Jimmy Croll conditioned horses for Rachel Carpenter for 37 years. At the time of her death in August 1993, she owned Croll's most famous horse, the then unraced Holy Bull. Just a few hours before the two-year-old colt made his racing debut, Croll was notified by telephone that in her will, Rachel Carpenter had bequeathed him the seven horses under his care which included Holy Bull.

In retirement, Croll and his wife made their home in Monmouth Beach, New Jersey.

Croll died on June 6, 2008, after a long illness at Monmouth Medical Center in Long Branch, New Jersey.
