= Spinaway Stakes =

- Class: Grade I
- Location: Saratoga Race Course; Saratoga Springs, New York, United States
- Inaugurated: 1881
- Race type: Thoroughbred – Flat racing
- Website: www.nyra.com/index_saratoga.html

Race information
- Distance: 7 furlongs
- Surface: Dirt
- Track: left-handed
- Qualification: Two-year-old fillies
- Weight: Assigned
- Purse: $300,000 (2021)

The Spinaway Stakes is an American Thoroughbred horse race run annually at Saratoga Race Course in Saratoga Springs, New York. Open to two-year-old fillies, it is a Grade I event contested at a distance of seven furlongs (1,408 metres) on dirt. The Spinaway is part of the Breeders' Cup Challenge series, providing a "Win and You're In" berth for the Breeders' Cup Juvenile Fillies.

The race was named for Spinaway who in 1880 was the dominant two-year-old filly in the United States and who beat her male counterparts in every one of her seven stakes wins.

Since inception in 1881, the Spinaway has been run at different distances:

- 5 furlongs : 1881–1900
- 5.5 furlongs : 1901–1921
- 6 furlongs : 1922–1993
- 7 furlongs : 1994 to present

The Spinaway was hosted by Belmont Park in 1943, 1944 and 1945. It was not run from 1892 to 1900. The race was cancelled in 1911 and 1912 following a New York State legislated ban on parimutuel betting.

In 2016, Sweet Loretta and Pretty City Dancer finished in a dead heat for first place. Both fillies were sired by leading sire Tapit.

== Records ==
Speed record:

- 1:22.28 – Hot Dixie Chick (2009) (current distance – 7 furlongs)
- 1:08.60 – Ruffian (1974) (previous distance – 6 furlongs)

Most wins by a jockey:

- 5 – Ángel Cordero Jr. (1977, 1980, 1984, 1987, 1989)

Most consecutive wins by a jockey:

- 3 – Tommy May (1945, 1946, 1947)

Most wins by a trainer:

- 7 – Todd A. Pletcher (1999, 2003, 2005, 2010, 2015, 2016, 2025)

Most wins by an owner:

- 4 – James R. Keene (1902, 1906, 1908, 1915)
- 4 – Greentree Stable (1929, 1932, 1949, 1955)

== Winners since 1948 ==
Year	Winner	Jockey	Trainer	Owner	Time
2026	Summer Starlet	Ricardo Santana Jr.	Steven M. Asmussen	BC Stables, Wattswood Stables, Bob Albritton, Jay Graham, and David Baggett	1:22.72
2025	Tommy Jo	Kendrick Carmouche	Todd A. Pletcher	Spendthrift Farm	1:23.39
2024	Immersive	Manuel Franco	Brad H. Cox	Godolphin Racing	1:25.31
2023	Brightwork	Irad Ortiz Jr.	John Ortiz	WSS Racing, LLC	1:23.17
2022	Leave No Trace	Jose Lezcano	Phillip Serpe	WellSpring Stables	1:24.03
2021	Echo Zulu	Ricardo Santana Jr.	Steven M. Asmussen	L And N Racing LLC & Winchell Thoroughbreds	1:22.51
2020	Vequist	Luis Saez	Robert E. Reid Jr.	Gary Barber, Wachtel Stable & Swilcan Stable	1:22.29
2019	Perfect Alibi	Irad Ortiz Jr.	Mark E. Casse	Tracy Farmer	1:23.44
2018	Sippican Harbor	Joel Rosario	Gary C. Contessa	Lee Pokoik	1:23.72
2017	Lady Ivanka	Irad Ortiz Jr.	Rudy Rodriguez	Michael Dubb, Bethlehem Stables, et al.	1:24.97
2016‡	Sweet Loretta	Javier Castellano	Todd A. Pletcher	St Elias Stable	1:24.18
2016‡	Pretty City Dancer	Irad Ortiz Jr.	Mark Casse	John C. Oxley	1:24.18
2015	Rachel's Valentina	John Velazquez	Todd A. Pletcher	Stonestreet Farms	1:23.10
2014	Condo Commando	Joe Bravo	Rudy Rodriguez	Michael Dubb/Bethlehem Stables/The Elkstone Group	1:24.68
2013	Sweet Reason	Alex O. Solis	Leah Gyarmati	Treadway Racing Stable	1:23.42
2012	So Many Ways	Javier Castellano	Tony Dutrow	Maggi Moss	1:23.74
2011	Grace Hall	Ramon Domínguez	Tony Dutrow	Michael Dubb, Bethlehem Stables (Mike Caruso), Stuart Grant	1:23.74
2010	R Heat Lightning	Garrett Gomez	Todd A. Pletcher	E. Paul Robsham Stables LLC	1:25.23
2009	Hot Dixie Chick	Robby Albarado	Steven M. Asmussen	Grace Stables	1:22.28
2008	Mani Bhavan	Alan Garcia	Steve Klesaris	Puglisi Racing et al.	1:25.23
2007	Irish Smoke	Julien Leparoux	Patrick Biancone	West Point Stables	1:24.24
2006	Appealing Zophie	Shaun Bridgmohan	Scott Blasi	Heiligbrodt Racing	1:23.79
2005	Adieu	John Velazquez	Todd A. Pletcher	Smith /Tabor/Magnier	1:23.68
2004	Sense of Style	Edgar Prado	Patrick Biancone	Smith & Tabor	1:23.83
2003	Ashado	Edgar Prado	Todd A. Pletcher	Starlight Stables et al.	1:24.08
2002	Awesome Humor	Pat Day	W. Elliott Walden	Winstar Farm	1:24.36
2001	Cashier's Dream	Donnie Meche	Steven M. Asmussen	Heiligbrodt Racing	1:23.47
2000	Stormy Pick	José C. Ferrer	Ben Perkins Jr.	Raymond Dweck	1:24.33
1999	Circle Of Life	John Velazquez	Todd A. Pletcher	Michael Tabor	1:23.25
1998	Things Change	José A. Santos	Linda L. Rice	John Ball	1:24.82
1997	Countess Diana	Shane Sellers	Patrick B. Byrne	Kaster & Propson	1:24.17
1996	Oath	Shane Sellers	Frank L. Brothers	Cherry Valley Farm	1:23.71
1995	Golden Attraction	Gary Stevens	D. Wayne Lukas	William T. Young	1:23.80
1994	Flanders	Pat Day	D. Wayne Lukas	William T. Young	1:23.00
1993	Strategic Maneuver	José A. Santos	Scotty Schulhofer	Philip Teinowitz	1:10.20
1992	Family Enterprize †	Pat Day	Joseph H. Pierce Jr.	Two Sisters Stable	1:09.80
1991	Miss Iron Smoke	Martin Pedrosa	Brian Mayberry	Jan Siegel	1:10.60
1990	Meadow Star	José A. Santos	LeRoy Jolley	Carl Icahn	1:10.20
1989	Stella Madrid	Ángel Cordero Jr.	D. Wayne Lukas	Peter M. Brant	1:10.40
1988	Seattle Meteor	Randy Romero	Ross Pearce	Buckland Farm	1:12.60
1987	Over All	Ángel Cordero Jr.	D. Wayne Lukas	Eugene V. Klein	1:11.00
1986	Tappiano	Jean Cruguet	Scotty Schulhofer	Frances A. Genter	1:11.40
1985	Family Style	Don MacBeth	D. Wayne Lukas	Eugene V. Klein	1:12.00
1984	Tiltalating	Ángel Cordero Jr.	D. Wayne Lukas	Eugene V. Klein	1:11.00
1983	Buzz My Bell	Jorge Velásquez	James J. Toner	Caesar P. Kimmel	1:13.20
1982	Share The Fantasy	Jeffrey Fell	LeRoy Jolley	Gerald Robins	1:09.80
1981	Before Dawn	Gregg McCarron	John M. Veitch	Calumet Farm	1:09.40
1980	Prayers 'N Promises	Ángel Cordero Jr.	Lou Rondinello	Daniel M. Galbreath	1:11.00
1979	Smart Angle	Sam Maple	Woody Stephens	Ryehill Farm	1:10.60
1978	Palm Hut	Roger I. Velez	James E. Picou	Joseph M. Roebling	1:10.60
1977	Sherry Peppers	Ángel Cordero Jr.	Thomas J. Kelly	Townsend B. Martin	1:10.80
1976	Mrs. Warren	Eddie Maple	Woody Stephens	Mrs. Taylor Hardin	1:10.40
1975	Dearly Precious	Michael Hole	Stephen A. DiMauro	Richard E. Bailey	1:10.60
1974	Ruffian	Vincent Bracciale Jr.	Frank Y. Whiteley Jr.	Locust Hill Farm	1:08.60
1973	Talking Picture	Ron Turcotte	John P. Campo	Elmendorf	1:10.00
1972	La Prevoyante	John LeBlanc	Yonnie Starr	Jean-Louis Levesque	1:10.80
1971	Numbered Account	Chuck Baltazar	Roger Laurin	Ogden Phipps	1:09.80
1970	Forward Gal	Frank Ianelli	Warren A. Croll Jr.	Aisco Stable	1:10.80
1969	Meritus	Manuel Ycaza	Woody Stephens	James Cox Brady	1:10.60
1968	Queen's Double	Braulio Baeza	Casey Hayes	Meadow Stable	1:11.40
1967	Queen of the Stage	Braulio Baeza	Edward A. Neloy	Ogden Phipps	1:10.20
1966	Silver True	John L. Rotz	Ivor G. Balding	C. V. Whitney	1:12.00
1965	Moccasin	Larry Adams	Harry Trotsek	Claiborne Farm	1:11.00
1964	Candalita	Braulio Baeza	James P. Conway	Darby Dan Farm	1:10.80
1963	Petite Rouge	Johnny Sellers	Woody Sedlacek	Jacques Wimpfheimer	1:12.60
1962	Affectionately	Ismael Valenzuela	Hirsch Jacobs	Ethel D. Jacobs	1:10.40
1961	Cicada	Ismael Valenzuela	Casey Hayes	Meadow Stable	1:12.00
1960	Good Move	Eric Guerin	William C. Winfrey	Alfred G. Vanderbilt	1:12.40
1959	Irish Jay †	Eddie Arcaro	James Fitzsimmons	Wheatley Stable	1:12.20
1958	Rich Tradition	William Boland	Casey Hayes	Christopher Chenery	1:12.80
1957	Sequoia	Bobby Ussery	Moody Jolley	Claiborne Farm	1:12.80
1956	Alanesian	William Boland	James W. Maloney	William Haggin Perry	1:12.60
1955	Register	Ted Atkinson	John M. Gaver Sr.	Greentree Stable	1:13.40
1954	Gandharva	Nick Shuk	Preston M. Burch	Brookmeade Stable	1:12.80
1953	Evening Out	Ovie Scurlock	Bert Mulholland	Mrs. G. D. Widener Jr.	1:13.60
1952	Flirtatious	Dave Gorman	James Fitzsimmons	Ogden Phipps	1:13.20
1951	Blue Case	Warren Mehrtens	John A. Nerud	Joseph M. Roebling	1:13.20
1950	Atalanta	Hedley Woodhouse	Preston M. Burch	Brookmeade Stable	1:13.00
1949	Sunday Evening	Ted Atkinson	John M. Gaver Sr.	Greentree Stable	1:11.60
1948	Myrtle Charm	Anthony Skoronski	James W. Smith	Maine Chance Farm	1:11.60

- † In 1959, Natalma finished first, but was disqualified and set back to third.
- † In 1992, Sky Beauty finished first but was disqualified and set back to third.
- ‡ In 2016, Pretty City Dancer and Sweet Loretta dead heated for first place.

== Earlier winners ==
- 1947 – Bellesoeur
- 1946 – Pipette
- 1945 – Sopranist
- 1944 – Price Level
- 1943 – Bee Mac
- 1942 – Our Page
- 1941 – Mar-Kell
- 1940 – Nasca
- 1939 – Now What
- 1938 – Dinner Date
- 1937 – Merry Lassie
- 1936 – Maecloud
- 1935 – Forever Yours
- 1934 – Vicaress
- 1933 – Contessa
- 1932 – Easy Day
- 1931 – Top Flight
- 1930 – Risque
- 1929 – Goose Egg
- 1928 – Atlantis
- 1927 – Twitter
- 1926 – Bonnie Pennant
- 1925 – Cinema
- 1924 – Blue Warbler
- 1923 – Anna Marrone II
- 1922 – Edict
- 1921 – Miss Joy
- 1920 – Prudery
- 1919 – Constancy
- 1918 – Passing Shower
- 1917 – Olive Wood
- 1916 – Yankee Witch
- 1915 – Jacoby
- 1914 – Lady Barbary
- 1913 – Casuarina
- 1910 – Bashti
- 1909 – Ocean Bound
- 1908 – Maskette
- 1907 – Julia Powell
- 1906 – Court Dress
- 1905 – Edna Jackson
- 1904 – Tanya
- 1903 – Raglan
- 1902 – Duster
- 1901 – Rossignol
- 1891 – Promenade
- 1890 – Sallie McClelland
- 1889 – Daisy F.
- 1888 – Gypsy Queen
- 1887 – Los Angeles
- 1886 – Grisette
- 1885 – Biggonet
- 1884 – Mission Belle
- 1883 – Tolu
- 1882 – Miss Woodford
- 1881 – Memento
