= Chick Lang Stakes =

Horse race in Baltimore, Maryland, US

- Class: Listed
- Location: Pimlico Race Course, Baltimore, Maryland, United States
- Inaugurated: 1975 (as Hirsch Jacobs Stakes)
- Race type: Thoroughbred – Flat racing

Race information
- Distance: 6 furlong sprint
- Surface: Dirt
- Track: left-handed
- Qualification: Three-year-olds
- Weight: 124 lbs with allowances
- Purse: US$150,000 (2025)

The Chick Lang Stakes is a Listed American Thoroughbred horse race for three-year-old horses run over a distance of six furlongs during the third week of May at Pimlico Race Course in Baltimore, Maryland.

== History ==
The race is named in honor of the former Pimlico General Manager who was known to Marylanders as "Mr. Preakness." Charles John (Chick) Lang died March 18, 2010, of natural causes at the age of 83. The Maryland Jockey Club made the name change shortly after his death.

The race was formerly named in honor of U.S. Racing Hall of Fame trainer Hirsch Jacobs (1904–1970). Jacobs was a leading trainer, owner and breeder at many eastern tracks from the 1930s through the 1960s. One of horse racing's premier trainers, Jacobs saddled 3,569 winners in his lifetime, more than anyone else in the history of thoroughbred racing at the time of his retirement. Horses that he trained earned more than $12,000,000 in purses. Jacobs led the United States in total number of yearly winners 11 times from 1933 to 1944, except 1940, when he finished second.

The Hirsch Jacobs Stakes was inaugurated in 1975. It became an American graded stakes race in 2005. The fastest time for the race is held by Songster, who won in 2006 in a time of 1:09.72.

In 2025 the event was downgraded by the Thoroughbred Owners and Breeders Association from Grade III to Listed status.

== Records ==
Speed record:

- 6 furlongs – 1:09.10 – Lantana Mob (2008)

Most wins by a horse:

- No horse has won this race more than once.

Most wins by an owner:

- 2 – Hal C.B. Clagett (1991, 1994)
- 2 – Israel Cohen (1992, 1993)
- 2 – Zayat Stables (2013, 2016)
- 2 – William & Corinne Heiligbrodt (2020, 2021)

Most wins by a jockey:

- 4 – Rick Wilson (1984, 1998, 1999, 2000)
- 3 – Ramon Domínguez (2002, 2003, 2004)

Most wins by a trainer:

- 7 – Steven M. Asmussen (2008, 2015, 2018, 2020, 2021, 2023, 2026)

== Winners of the Chick Lang Stakes since 1975 ==
Year	Winner	Jockey	Trainer	Owner	Dist.	Time	Purse	Grade
2026	Obliteration	José Ortiz	Steven M. Asmussen	Leland Ackerley Racing, LLC, James Sherwood, Jode Shupe & John Cilia	6 fur.	1:09.77	$150,000	Listed
2025	Retribution	Irad Ortiz Jr.	Cherie DeVaux	Belladonna Racing, Twin Brook Stables, Woodford Racing, B.C.W.T. Ltd., Savvy Stables, GRC Racing & Taylor Creek	6 fur.	1:11.27	$150,000	Listed
2024	Frost Free	Irad Ortiz Jr.	Brett Creighton	Keene Thoroughbreds LLC	6 fur.	1:11.39	$200,000	III
2023	Ryvit	Tyler Gaffalione	Steve Asmussen	William L. Heiligbrodt & Corinne Heiligbrodt	6 fur.	1:09.33	$200,000	III
2022	Lightening Larry	Chantal Sutherland	Jorge Delgado	Lea Farms	6 fur.	1:09.86	$200,000	III
2021	Mighty Mischief	Ricardo Santana	Steve Asmussen	William & Corinne Heiligbrodt	6 fur.	1:09.74	$200,000	III
2020	Yaupon	John R. Velazquez	Steve Asmussen	William & Corinne Heiligbrodt	6 fur.	1:09.10	$200,000	III
2019	Lexitonian	José Ortiz	Jack Sisteron	Calumet Farm	6 fur.	1:09.74	$200,000	III
2018	Mitole	Ricardo Santana Jr.	Steve Asmussen	Heiligbrodt Racing Stable	6 fur.	1:09.29	$200,000	III
2017	Recruiting Ready	Horacio Karamanos	Horacio DePaz	Sagamore Farm	6 fur.	1:10.35	$200,000	III
2016	Justin Squared	Martin A. Pedroza	Bob Baffert	Zayat Stables	6 fur.	1:11.41	$200,000	
2015	Holy Boss	Ricardo Santana	Steve Asmussen	Jerry Durant	6 fur.	1:09.61	$100,000	
2014	Meadowood	Javier Castellano	Derek Ryan	Stonestreet Stables	6 fur.	1:10.11	$100,000	
2013	Zee Bros	Martin Garcia	Bob Baffert	Zayat Stables	6 fur.	1:10.72	$100,000	
2012	Il Villano	Jose Flores	Susan Crowell	Chuck Russo	6 fur.	1:10.40	$100,000	
2011	Vengeful Wildcat	Carlos Marquez	Ben W. Perkins	New Farm (Everett Novak)	6 fur.	1:10.54	$100,000	III
2010	Comedero	Robby Albarado	Michael Stidham	Peter Redekop B. C.	6 fur.	1:10.16	$100,000	III
2009	Everyday Heroes	Jose Caraballo	Timothy F. Ritchey	Cash Counter Stables	6 fur.	1:09.51	$100,000	III
2008	Lantana Mob	Robby Albarado	Steve Asmussen	Vinery Stables/T.Ludt	6 fur.	1:09.10	$100,000	III
2007	Street Magician	Rafael Bejarano	Michael Trombetta	R. Larry Johnson	6 fur.	1:10.97	$100,000	III
2006	Songster	Edgar Prado	Thomas Albertrani	Darley Racing	6 fur.	1:09.72	$100,000	III
2005	Race not held							III
2004	Abbondanza	Ramon Domínguez	Timothy Tullock	Germania Farms	6 fur.	1:10.72	$100,000	
2003	Mt Carson	Ramon Domínguez	Rodney Jenkins	David P. Reynolds	6 fur.	1:10.85	$100,000	
2002	True Direction	Ramon Domínguez	Carlos Morales	Morton & Marisol Binn	6 fur.	1:10.90	$75,000	
2001	City Zip	Jorge Chavez	Linda L. Rice	Charles R. Thompson	6 fur.	1:10.20	$75,000	
2000	Max's Pal	Rick Wilson	Ben W. Perkins	Lambholm South, LLC	6 fur.	1:10.20	$75,000	
1999	Earlton	Rick Wilson	Ben W. Perkins	New Farm (Everett Novak)	6 fur.	1:10.60	$75,000	
1998	Klabin's Gold	Rick Wilson	Allen Iwinski	Acclaimed Racing	6 fur.	1:11.40	$55,000	
1997	Original Gray	Carlos H. Marquez	John J. Tammaro	Thornmar Farm	6 fur.	1:10.80	$55,000	
1996	Viv	Mark Johnston	Grover G. Delp	Rebecca Anglin	6 fur.	1:12.00	$55,000	
1995	Ft. Stockton	Jerry Bailey	Ben W. Perkins	New Farm	6 fur.	1:10.20	$55,000	
1994	Foxie G.	Edgar Prado	Dale Capuano	Hal C.B. Clagett	6 fur.	1:11.40	$55,000	
1993	Montbrook	Mike Luzzi	Dean Gaudet	Israel Cohen	6 fur.	1:12.00	$55,000	
1992	Speakerphone	Clarence Ladner	Dean Gaudet	Israel Cohen	6 fur.	1:10.40	$43,500	
1991	Ameri Run	Greg W. Hutton	Jerry Robb	Hal C.B. Clagett	6 fur.	1:10.80	$43,500	
1990	Collegian	Harry Vega	John Rigattieri	Michael Jackson	6 fur.	1:10.20	$43,500	
1989	Pulverizing	Allen T. Stacy	Jerry Robb	Arnold & Sylvia Heft	6 fur.	1:11.20	$55,000	
1988	Finder's Choice	José A. Santos	Charles Hadry	Stuart S. Janney III	6 fur.	1:12.20	$46,500	
1987	Green Book	Greg W. Hutton	Ron Alfano	H. Joseph Allen	6 fur.	1:11.80	$47,000	
1986	Super Delight	John "Jake" Nied	Dennis Heimer	Tartan Farms	6 fur.	1:11.80	$35,000	
1985	Beat Me Daddy	Vincent Bracciale	Robert E. Wheeler	Napton Hill Farm	6 fur.	1:11.80	$35,000	
1984	Mickey Mall	Rick Wilson	Sal Campo	Stanley Joselson	6 fur.	1:10.80	$35,000	
1983	Imperial Age	John "Jake" Nied	J. William Boniface	Bonita Farm	6 fur.	1:10.80	$35,000	
1982	Mortgage Man	Anthony S. Black	Richard Dutrow	Dr. Rifat Hussain	6 fur.	1:10.60	$35,000	
1981	Century Prince	Vincent Bracciale	Ronald A. Alfano	Dick Woolley	6 fur.	1:10.60	$32,350	
1980	Amber Pass	Don MacBeth	Sonny Hine	Entremont Stable	6 fur.	1:10.80	$35,000	
1979	Breezing On	William Passmore	Laz Barrera	Harbor View Farm	6 fur.	1:11.80	$35,000	
1978	Shelter Half	Gunnar Lindberg	Douglas R. Peterson	Four Brothers Stable	6 fur.	1:11.00	$36,075	
1977	Iron Derby	Danny R. Wright	H. Steward Mitchell	Mario Stable	6 fur.	1:11.20	$29,800	
1976	Zen	Jorge Vasquez	David A. Whiteley	Pen Y Bryn Farm	6 fur.	1:11.40	$29,200	
1975	Bombay Duck	Menotti Aristone	Ben W. Perkins	Shelly Meredith	6 fur.	1:11.20	$31,000	

== See also ==
- Chick Lang Stakes "top three finishers" and starters
