= Woodrow Sedlacek =

American horse trainer (1919–2004)

Woody Sedlacek
Personal information
- Born: June 7, 1919 United States
- Died: July 19, 2004 (aged 85)
- Occupation: Trainer

Horse racing career
- Sport: Horse racing
- Career wins: Not found

Major racing wins
- Adirondack Stakes (1963, 1965); Spinaway Stakes (1963); Bed O' Roses Handicap (1975); Distaff Handicap (1976); Prioress Stakes (1977); Vagrancy Handicap (1977); Jamaica Handicap (1983); Wood Memorial Stakes (1983); Brooklyn Handicap (1985); Massachusetts Handicap (1985); Meadowlands Cup (1985); Withers Stakes (1985); Fall Highweight Handicap (1987); Maryland Sprint Handicap (1987)

Significant horses
- Bounding Basque

Woodrow Sedlacek (June 7, 1919 – July 19, 2004) was an American Thoroughbred flat racing horse trainer.

Sedlacek is best remembered as the trainer of Bounding Basque with whom he won one edition of the 1983 Wood Memorial Stakes, and in 1985 the Brooklyn Handicap, the Massachusetts Handicap, and equaled the track record for 1¼ miles Meadowlands Cup.

Sedlacek started in Thoroughbred horse racing as a jockey during the 1930s. He was almost killed in a racing accident in 1937 that left him with a plate in his head. In 1945, he began working as a trainer and retired from the sport in 1997 to a home in Florida.

Sedlacek died from cancer in Ocala, Florida in 2004 at the age of 85.
