= Forward Gal =

American-bred Thoroughbred racehorse

- Sire: Native Charger
- Grandsire: Native Dancer
- Dam: Forward Thrust
- Damsire: Jet Action
- Sex: Mare
- Foaled: 1968
- Country: United States
- Colour: Bay
- Breeder: Abraham I. Savin
- Owner: Aisco Stable
- Trainer: Warren A. Croll, Jr.
- Record: 26: 12-4-6
- Earnings: US$438,933

Major wins
- Frizette Stakes (1970); Sorority Stakes (1970); Schuylkill Stakes (1970); Spinaway Stakes (1970); Gazelle Handicap (1971); Betsy Ross Handicap (1971); Monmouth Oaks (1971); Comely Stakes (1971)

Awards
- American Champion Two-Year-Old Filly (1970)

Honours
- Forward Gal Stakes at Gulfstream Park

Forward Gal (foaled 1968 in Florida) was an American Thoroughbred Champion racehorse. Out of the mare, Forward Thrust, she was sired by Florida Derby winner Native Charger who also sired 1970 Belmont Stakes winner High Echelon.

Bred by Abraham Savin and raced under the colors of his Aisco Stable, Forward Gal was trained by future U.S. Racing Hall of Fame inductee, Warren Croll. In 1970 Forward Gal's performances earned her American Champion Two-Year-Old Filly honors and although she did not repeat as champion at age three, she was one of the top fillies in her age group and under jockey Michael Hole won several important races including the 1971 Gazelle Handicap and Comely Stakes.

Retired to broodmare duty, Forward Gal was bred to sires such as Northern Dancer and Secretariat. Of her five foals, none succeeded in racing. Forward Gal died in 1984.
