= Patrick B. Byrne =

English racehorse trainer

Patrick Byrne
Personal information
- Born: March 8, 1956 (age 70) London, England
- Occupation: Trainer

Horse racing career
- Sport: Horse racing

Major racing wins
- Tremont Stakes (1988); Bourbon Stakes (1995); Lexington Stakes (1996); Long Island Handicap (1996); Alcibiades Stakes (1997); Breeders' Futurity Stakes (1997); Derby Trial Stakes (1997); Stephen Foster Handicap (1997, 1998); Hopeful Stakes (1997); Jerome Handicap (1997); Sanford Stakes (1997); Saratoga Special Stakes (1997); Spinaway Stakes (1997); Hawthorne Gold Cup Handicap (1998, 2001); Kentucky Cup Classic Stakes (1998); Princess Elizabeth Stakes (1998); Whitney Handicap (1998); Fayette Stakes (1999); Regret Stakes (1999); Widener Handicap (1999); Swale Stakes (2002); San Fernando Stakes (2003); Ben Ali Stakes (2002) Breeders' Cup wins: Breeders' Cup Juvenile (1997); Breeders' Cup Juvenile Fillies (1997); Breeders' Cup Classic (1998)

Racing awards
- United Thoroughbred Trainers of America Award for Outstanding Trainer (1997)

Significant horses
- Awesome Again, Countess Diana, Favorite Trick, Golden Missile

Patrick B. Byrne (born March 8, 1956, in London, England) is an American Thoroughbred racehorse trainer who has won three Breeders' Cup races and who in 1997 conditioned Favorite Trick to American Champion Two-Year-Old Colt and American Horse of the Year honors and Countess Diana to American Champion Two-Year-Old Filly honors.

A native of London, England, Byrne was from a family involved in horse racing. He rode horses in Europe before emigrating to the United States in 1978 where he worked in New York as an exercise rider. He then spent eight years learning the training business from trainers such as LeRoy Jolley, John Russell, Howard Tesher and David Whitely before taking out his trainers license in 1986.

In 1998, Patrick Byrne trained Awesome Again to an undefeated year that was capped off with a win in the Breeders' Cup Classic.

Byrne makes his home in Louisville, Kentucky, where he settled in 1990, competing from a base at Churchill Downs.
