= Questing (horse) =

British-bred Thoroughbred racehorse

- Sire: Hard Spun
- Grandsire: Danzig
- Dam: Chercheuse
- Damsire: Seeking the Gold
- Sex: Filly
- Foaled: 13 April 2009
- Country: United Kingdom
- Colour: Bay
- Breeder: Darley Stud
- Owner: Godolphin Racing
- Trainer: John Gosden; Kiaran McLaughlin
- Record: 11:4-2-1
- Earnings: £565,135

Major wins
- Coaching Club American Oaks (2012); Alabama Stakes (2012)

Awards
- American Champion Three-Year-Old Filly (2012)

Questing (foaled 2009) is a British-bred Thoroughbred filly. After beginning her career in England she was transferred to the United States where she won the Coaching Club American Oaks and Alabama Stakes. In the Eclipse Awards for 2012 she was voted American Champion Three-Year-Old Filly.

== Background ==
Questing is a bay filly with a small white star bred in the United Kingdom by Sheikh Mohammed's Darley Stud. She was from the first crop of foals sired by the Kentucky Derby runner-up Hard Spun Her dam, the Seeking the Gold mare Chercheuse is a descendant of the champion racehorse and broodmare Vagrancy. Chercheuse was a good racehorse, but below top class, winning five times in France including two Listed races. Questing was originally sent into training with John Gosden at Newmarket, Suffolk.

== Racing career ==
=== 2011: two-year-old season ===
Questing began her racing career by winning a maiden race over seven furlongs at Newbury Racecourse in June. When moved up in class she finished third in the Group Three Prestige Stakes at Goodwood in August and second in the Group Three Oh So Sharp Stakes at Newmarket in September. She made her US debut in the 2011 Breeders' Cup Juvenile Fillies, where she finished fifth behind My Miss Aurelia.

=== 2012: three-year-old season ===
For the 2011 season, Questing was transferred to the United States to be trained by Kiaran McLaughlin. She began racing on grass and finished unplaced in her first two races. In June, she was switched to the dirt for an allowance race at Belmont Park, where she recorded her first win in America. In the following month, she was moved up in class for the Grade I Coaching Club American Oaks over nine furlongs at Saratoga Race Course. Ridden by 19-year-old Irad Ortiz, she took the lead after half a mile, went clear of her rivals, and won by four and a quarter lengths from Zo Impressive and Black-Eyed Susan Stakes winner In Lingerie. In the Alabama Stakes at the same course a month later, she led from the start to beat In Lingerie by nine lengths. In her next race, she was beaten a head when conceding seven pounds to My Miss Aurelia in the Cotillion Stakes at Parx in September. On her final start of the season, Questing struggled from the start of the Breeders' Cup Ladies' Classic and was pulled up by Ortiz in the backstretch.
