= Dapper Dan (horse) =

American-bred Thoroughbred racehorse

- Sire: Ribot
- Grandsire: Tenerani
- Dam: So Chic
- Damsire: Nasrullah
- Sex: Stallion
- Foaled: 1962
- Country: United States
- Colour: Chestnut
- Breeder: Dorothy Dorsett Brown
- Owner: Ogden Phipps
- Trainer: William Winfrey
- Record: 24: 5-6-1
- Earnings: US$112,102

Major wins
- American Classic Race placing: Kentucky Derby 2nd (1965); Preakness Stakes 2nd (1965)

Dapper Dan (foaled 1962 in Kentucky) was an American racehorse who was bred by Dorothy Dorsett Brown and owned and raced by Ogden Phipps. He had an outstanding sophomore season, finishing second or fourth in five stakes races. The son of Ribot and grandson of Nasrullah is remembered for his closing finishes to place second in the 1965 Kentucky Derby and Preakness Stakes.

== Racing career ==
As a three-year-old, Dapper Dan finished second in three of his first four stakes races that spring. In March, he placed second in the Gotham Stakes at Aqueduct Racetrack. He then ran fourth in the Wood Memorial Stakes.

On the first Saturday of May in the 1965 Kentucky Derby at Churchill Downs, Dapper Dan faded to near the back of the pack early and closed to finish second to Lucky Debonair. He ran the last quarter mile in track record time of 23 1/5 seconds. That record stood until Secretariat's :23 flat in 1973.

In the second leg of the U.S. Triple Crown series, the Preakness Stakes. Dapper Dan went off as fifth choice at 7:1 in a strong field of ten three year-old colts. He broke from post eight and settled in seventh place going into the clubhouse turn at Pimlico Race Course. Dapper Dan continued to make up ground after three furlongs and moved up to fourth at the top of the stretch. The leader, Tom Rolfe, veered into Dapper Dan's path after heavy right-handed whips by jockey Ron Turcotte. At about the sixteenth pole, the leaders brushed slightly. Tom Rolfe then held off Dapper Dan by a decreasing neck. Dapper Dan's jockey, Ismael Valenzuela, lodged an objection against Turcotte and Tom Rolfe for intimidation. However, the stewards upheld the finish with Tom Rolfe in first, Dapper Dan in second, and Hail to All in third, four lengths back.

Three weeks later, Dapper Dan finished fourth to Hail To All in the Belmont Stakes at Belmont Park in New York.

== Four-year-old season ==
As a four-year-old, Dapper Dan finished third behind Davis 2nd in April 1966 in the Carter Handicap at Aqueduct Racetrack. On Memorial Day, he placed fourth in the Metropolitan Handicap at Belmont Park behind Bold Lad.
