= Colleen Stakes =

American Thoroughbred horse race

- Class: Non-graded stakes
- Location: Monmouth Park Racetrack; Oceanport, New Jersey, United States
- Inaugurated: 1887
- Race type: Thoroughbred – Flat racing
- Website: www.monmouthpark.com

Race information
- Distance: 5 furlongs
- Surface: turf
- Track: left-handed
- Qualification: Two-year-old fillies
- Weight: Assigned
- Purse: $112,000 (2025)

The Colleen Stakes is an American Thoroughbred horse race held annually in late July or early August at Monmouth Park Racetrack in Oceanport, New Jersey. Open to two-year-old fillies, it is contested on turf over a distance of five furlongs.

Inaugurated in 1887 at the Monmouth Park Association racetrack near Long Branch, New Jersey, it was raced at Jerome Park Racetrack in Fordham, New York, in 1891, when the Monmouth meet moved there under pressure from New Jersey State anti-gambling politicians. The race returned to Monmouth Park for 1892 and 1893, after which New Jersey banned wagering on horse races and the racetrack was forced out of business. Pari-mutuel wagering returned to New Jersey in the 1940s, and the new Monmouth Park Racetrack opened in 1946, with the Colleen Stakes again part of its racing schedule.

The Colleen Stakes was run in two divisions in 1949, 1980, 1986 and 1987.

In 2012, the distance was reduced from 5 1/2 furlongs to five furlongs and the race was moved from dirt to turf.

== Records ==
The fastest time recorded at the current five-furlong distance is 0:55.64, set by Dreamaway in 2024.

== Winners ==
Colleen Stakes winners since 1999
Year	Winner	Jockey	Trainer	Owner	Time	Surface	Distance
2025	Gerrards Cross	Sonny Leon	Kathleen O'connell	James M. Chicklo	0:57.50	Turf	5 f
2024	Dreamaway	Paco Lopez	Wesley A. Ward	John C. Oxley	0:55.64	Turf	5 f
2023	Amidst Waves	Feargal Lynch	George Weaver	R. A. Hill Stable	0:57.68	Turf	5 f
2022	Sweet Harmony	Samy Camacho	John P. Terranova, II	Gatsas Stables, R. A. Hill Stable, Schoenfeld, Steven and Smart Choice Stable	0:56.37	Turf	5 f
2021	Miss Alacrity	Paco Lopez	Wesley A. Ward	CJ Thoroughbreds (Corey J. Johnsen, Managing Partner)	0:57.23	Turf	5 f
2020	Wink	Antonio Gallardo	Wesley A. Ward	Stonestreet Stables	0:56.74	Turf	5 f
2019	Foolish Humor	Paco Lopez	Wesley A. Ward	Andrew Farm	0:56.38	Turf	5 f
2018	Mae Never No	Jose Ferrer	Wesley A. Ward	Ice Wine Stable	0:57.98	Turf	5 f
2017	Bronx Beauty	Eddie Castro	Anthony Margotta, Jr.	2W Stables	1:06.10	Dirt	5 1/2 f
2016	Red Lodge	Paco Lopez	Wesley A. Ward	Head of Plains Partners LLC, Hat Creek Racing	1:02.98	Turf	5 1/2 f
2015	Ruby Notion	Rafael M. Hernandez	Wesley A. Ward	Silverton Hill LLC (Bonnie & Tommy Hamilton)	0:56.77	Turf	5 f
2014	Harlan's Honor	Frankie Pennington	Cathal A. Lynch	Margaret & David Wimer	0:56.03	Turf	5 f
2013	Flay Mignon	Paco Lopez	Edward Plesa Jr.	Laurie Plesa	0:56.77	Turf	5 f
2012	Funfair	Joe Bravo	Christophe Clement	Dr. Catherine M. Wills	0:56.68	Turf	5 f
2011	Say a Novena	Mike Luzzi	Edward Plesa Jr.	Rick Shanley	1:04.29	Dirt	5 1/2 f
2010	Twelve Pack Shelly	Harry Vega	John E. Salzman Jr.	John E. Salzman Jr., Danny Divver, George Greenwalt	1:05.00	Dirt	5 1/2 f
2009	Hidden Expression	Eddie Castro	Todd M. Beattie	R. L. Beattie et al.	1:04.60	Dirt	5 1/2 f
2008	Smokin Bayou	Jose Lezcano	Steve Asmussen	Gulf Coast Farms	1:04.89	Dirt	5 1/2 f
2007	New York City Girl	Christopher DeCarlo	Todd A. Pletcher	Gold Square	1:04.12	Dirt	5 1/2 f
2006	Bovell Road	Christopher DeCarlo	Todd A. Pletcher	Melnyk Racing	1:05.00	Dirt	5 1/2 f
2005	Livermore Valley	Aaron Gryder	James T. Ryerson	Conover Stable	1:04.56	Dirt	5 1/2 f
2004	I'm A Dixie Girl	Stewart Elliott	Bruce N. Levine	William A. Carl	1:04.76	Dirt	5 1/2 f
2003	Fashion Girl	Joe Bravo	D. Wayne Lukas	Overbrook Farm	1:04.89	Dirt	5 1/2 f
2002	Forever Partners	Chuck C. Lopez	Anthony W. Dutrow	Skeedattle Stable (Willie White, Lou Rehak, Bob Orndorff)	1:03.12	Dirt	5 1/2 f
2001	Forest Heiress	Dale Beckner	Benjamin W. Perkins Jr.	New Farm (Everett "Ebby" Novak)	1:03.55	Dirt	5 1/2 f
2000	Queen Carson	Joe Bravo	D. Wayne Lukas	Padua Stables	1:05.03	Dirt	5 1/2 f
1999	Apollo Cat	Eddie King Jr.	D. Wayne Lukas	Overbrook Farm	1:04.26	Dirt	5 1/2 f

== Earlier winners ==
- 1995 – Careless Heiress
- 1993 – At The Half
- 1992 – Royal Linkage
- 1991 – American Royale
- 1990 – Barbara's Nemesis
- 1989 – Chrissys Secret
- 1988 – Divine Answer
- 1987 – Blue Jean Baby (1st Div.)
- 1987 – Lost Kitty (2nd Div.)
- 1986 – Dr. Myrtle (1st Div.)
- 1986 – Burnished Bright (2nd Div.)
- 1985 – Lazer Show
- 1984 – Count Pennies
- 1983 – Hot Milk
- 1981 – Sabotage
- 1980 – Queen Designate (1st Div.)
- 1980 – Madame Premier (2nd Div.)
- 1979 – Accipiter's Dream
- 1978 – Mongo Queen
- 1977 – Sunny Bay
- 1976 – Sensational
- 1975 – Dearly Precious
- 1973 – Celestial Lights
- 1972 – Marian Z
- 1971 – Rondeau
- 1970 – Deceit
- 1969 – Ashua
- 1968 – Process Shot
- 1967 – Syrian Sea
- 1966 – Rhubarb
- 1965 – Never In Paris
- 1964 – Queen Empress
- 1963 – Busy Jill
- 1962 – No Resisting
- 1961 – Batter Up
- 1960 – Little Tumbler
- 1959 – Rose of Serro
- 1958 – Lady Be Good
- 1957 – Poly Hi
- 1956 – Leallah
- 1955 – Doubledogdare
- 1954 – High Voltage
- 1953 – Incidentally & Lady Bouncer
- 1952 – Late Model
- 1951 – Star-Enfin
- 1950 – Sungari
- 1949 – Almahmoud (1st Div.)
- 1949 – Bed O' Roses (2nd Div.)
- 1948 – Raise You
- 1947 – Elastic
- 1946 – Pipette
- 1893 – Beldemere
- 1892 – Helen Nichols
- 1891 – Melba
- 1890 – Reckon
- 1889 – Starlight
- 1888 – Felicia II
- 1887 – Belinda
