= Chick Lang Stakes top three finishers =

This is a listing of the horses that finished in either first, second, or third place and the number of starters in the Chick Lang Stakes, a grade 3 American thoroughbred race on dirt at six furlongs at Pimlico Race Course in Baltimore, Maryland formerly known as the Hirsch Jacobs Stakes.

Year	Winner	Second	Third	Starters
2026	Obliteration	Shane’s Wonder	Igniter	7
2025	Retribution	Touchy	Ancient World	11
2024	Frost Free	Cats by Five	Mr Skylight	8
2023	Ryvit	Prince of Jericho	Frosted Departure	7
2022	Lightening Larry	Cogburn	Chasing Time	8
2021	Mighty Mischief	Jaxon Traveler	Hemp	6
2020	Yaopon	Double Crown	Relentless Dancer	9
2019	Lexitonian	Gladiator King	Admiral Lynch	9
2018	Mitole	Still Having Fun	Clouded Judgement	9
2017	Recruiting Ready	Aquamarine	Three Rules	9
2016	Justin Squared	Counterforce	Formal Summation	8
2015	Holy Boss	Victory Is Sweet	Gimme Da Lute	11
2014	Meadowood	Brewing	Prudhoe Bay	9
2013	Zee Bros	Bobcat Jim	Brave Dave	9
2012	Il Villano	Laurie's Rocket	Innocent Man	8
2011	Vengeful Wildcat	Chip Shot	Road Ready	8
2010	Comedero	Latigo Shore	Quiet Invader	6
2009	Everyday Heroes	Not for Silver	Checklist	9
2008	Lantana Mob	Silver Edition	Force Freeze	9
2007	Street Magician	Southwestern Heat	Hobbitontherocks	7
2006	Songster	Valid Brush	Urban Guy	6
2005	No Race	No Race	No Race	0
2004	Abbondanza	Bwana Charlie	Penn Pacific	9
2003	Mt. Carson	Gators N Bears	Only the Best	8
2002	True Direction	Listen Here	It's a Monster	8
2001	City Zip	Sea of Green	Stake Runner	7
2000	Max's Pal	Ultimate Warrior	Stormin Oedy	8
1999	Erlton	Jeanies Rob	Jovial Brush	7
1998	Klabin's Gold	Carnivorous Habit	Greenspring Willy	7
1997	Original Gray	American Champ	Stroke	9
1996	Viv	Fort Dodge	Big Rut	6
1995	Ft. Stockton	Splendid Sprinter	Sittin Cool	6
1994	Foxie G	Distinct Reality	Spartan's Hero	7
1993	Montbrook	Without Dissent	Mighty Game	7
1992	Speakerphone	Coin Collector	Golden Phase	7
1991	Ameri Run	Exclusive Dove	Nasty Hero	6
1990	Collegian	Hit the Mahogoney	Bardland	5
1989	Pulverizing	Jimmy Coggins	Midas	6
1988	Finder's Choice	Smarter Than	Royal Highlander	4
1987	Green Book	Judge's Dream	Silano	7
1986	Super Delight	Part Dutch	Fun Bunch	8
1985	Beat Me Daddy	Banjo Dancing	Urigo	7
1984	Mickey Mall	Moschini	Bold Flunky	7
1983	Emperial Age	Unreal Zeal	Zeb's Hell Cat	5
1982	Mortgage Man	Woody's Wish	St. Chrisbee	7
1981	Century Prince	J. D. Quill	Irish King	5
1980	Amber Pass	Pickett's Charge	Peace for Peace	8
1979	Breezing On	Fearless McGuire	Our Gary	8
1978	Shelter Half	Star de Naskra	Game Prince	9
1977	Iron Derby	Jeff's Try	Tiny Monk	7
1976	Zen	Cojak	Greek Victor	4
1975	Bombay Duck	Gallant Bob	Ben S.	9

A † designates an American Champion or Eclipse Award winner.
