= Adirondack Stakes =

Horse race held in New York, United States

- Class: Grade III
- Location: Saratoga Race Course; Saratoga Springs, New York, United States
- Inaugurated: 1901
- Race type: Thoroughbred – Flat racing
- Website: www.nyra.com/index_saratoga.html

Race information
- Distance: 6.5 furlong sprint
- Surface: Dirt
- Track: left-handed
- Qualification: Two-year-old fillies
- Weight: Assigned
- Purse: US$200,000 (since 2012)

The Adirondack Stakes is an American Thoroughbred horse race first run in 1901. Held in the middle of August at Saratoga Race Course in Saratoga Springs, New York, the Adirondack Stakes is open to two-year-old fillies willing to race six and a half furlongs on the dirt. It is a Grade III event with a current purse of $200,000 (raised from $150,000 in 2012.)

Named for the Adirondack Mountains of northeastern New York State, the race was first run in 1901 as a handicap for two-year-olds of either sex. Beginning in 1930 the race was restricted to fillies. Since inception, the Adirondack has been contested at various distances:

- 5.5 furlongs : 1952–1955
- 6 furlongs : 1901–1910, 1913–1945, 1962–1993, 2005
- 6.5 furlongs : 1994–2003, 2006–present

This race was at Belmont Park in 1943, 1944, and 1945; and at Jamaica Race Course in 1953 and 1954. It was not run in 1911 and 1912; from 1946 to 1952, from 1956 to 1961 and in 2004.

== Records ==
Speed record: (at current distance of 6.5 furlongs)

- 1:15.16 – You (2001)

Most wins by a jockey:

- 4 – Jorge Velásquez (1980, 1981, 1983, 1985)

Most wins by an owner:

- 3 – Stonestreet Stables (2011, 2012, 2014)
- 3 – Harry Payne Whitney (1908, 1917, 1920)
- 3 – Edward R. Bradley (1934, 1935, 1944)

Most wins by a trainer:

- 7 – D. Wayne Lukas (1985, 1986, 1987, 1988, 1997, 2005, 2022)

== Winners since 1953 ==
Year	Winner	Jockey	Trainer	Owner	Time
2026	Stress Relief	Junior Alvarado	Kinnon LaRose	Joel Politi	1:17.45
2025	Mythical	Emisael Jaramillo	Jorge Delgado	Arindel, LLC	1:17.20
2024	The Queens M G	Dylan Davis	Saffie A. Joseph Jr.	C Two Racing Stable & Mathis Stable	1:17.83
2023	Brightwork	Irad Ortiz Jr.	John Alexander Ortiz	WSS Racing, LLC	1:16.85
2022	Naughty Gal	Luis Saez	D. Wayne Lukas	Holy Cow Stables LLC	1:18.97
2021	Wicked Halo	José Ortiz	Steve Asmussen	Winchell Thoroughbreds	1:17.99
2020	Thoughtfully	Ricardo Santana Jr.	Steve Asmussen	Heider Family Stables LLC	1:17.20
2019	Perfect Alibi	Irad Ortiz Jr.	Mark Casse	Tracy Farmer	1:18.39
2018	Sue's Fortune	Junior Alvarado	Jeremiah C. Englehart	Fortune Farm (Richard Nicolai)	1:19.83
2017	Pure Silver	John Velazquez	Todd Pletcher	Twin Creeks Racing Stables LLC	1:17.22
2016	Nonna Mela	Javier Castellano	Todd Pletcher	St. Elias Stable	1:16.83
2015	Just Wicked	José Ortiz	Steve Asmussen	Ron Winchell	1:16.61
2014	Cavorting	Irad Ortiz Jr.	Kiaran McLaughlin	Stonestreet Stables	1:16.49
2013	Designer Legs	Shaun Bridgmohan	Dallas Stewart	Valene Farms	1:16.42
2012	Kauai Katie	Rosie Napravnik	Todd Pletcher	Stonestreet Stables	1:16.81
2011	My Miss Aurelia	Julien Leparoux	Steve Asmussen	Stonestreet Stables	1:17.01
2010	Position Limit	John Velazquez	Todd Pletcher	Starlight Partners	1:17.30
2009	Worstcasescenario	Alan Garcia	Richard Violette Jr.	Klaravich Stables & William Lawrence	1:16.72
2008	Mani Bhavan	Alan Garcia	Steve Klesaris	TYB Stable	1:18.09
2007	More Happy	Rafael Bejarano	Bob Baffert	John G. Sikura	1:17.51
2006	Octave	Garrett Gomez	Todd A. Pletcher	Starlight Stable & Donald Lucarelli	1:19.04
2005	Folklore	Cornelio Velásquez	D. Wayne Lukas	Robert & Beverly Lewis	1:13.66
2004	no race				
2003	Whoopi Cat	Edgar Prado	Patrick Biancone	Derrick Smith & Michael Tabor	1:17.51
2002	Awesome Humor	Pat Day	W. Elliott Walden	Winstar Farm	1:17.75
2001	You	Edgar Prado	Robert J. Frankel	Edmund A. Gann	1:15.16
2000	Raging Fever	Jerry Bailey	Mark A. Hennig	Edward P. Evans	1:17.47
1999	Regally Appealing	Edgar Prado	John C. Kimmel	Heiligbrodt Racing Stable	1:16.80
1998	Things Change	José A. Santos	Linda L. Rice	Ball Karr et al.	1:18.06
1997	Salty Perfume	Shane Sellers	D. Wayne Lukas	Robert & Beverly Lewis	1:17.80
1996	Storm Song	Pat Day	Nick Zito	Dogwood Stable	1:17.60
1995	Flat Fleet Feet	Mike E. Smith	John C. Kimmel	Caesar Kimmel	1:16.60
1994	Seeking Regina	Jerry Bailey	LeRoy Jolley	Kentucky Blue Stables	1:18.40
1993	Astas Foxy Lady	Randy Romero	W. R. Manuel	Valene Farms	1:10.00
1992	Sky Beauty	Eddie Maple	H. Allen Jerkens	Georgia E. Hofmann	1:10.00
1991	American Royale	Aaron Gryder	Lisa L. Lewis	William S. Farish III	1:10.60
1990	Really Quick	Ángel Cordero Jr.	LeRoy Jolley	Carl Icahn	1:11.40
1989	Dance Colony	José A. Santos	Ross Pearce	Buckland Farm	1:11.80
1988	Pat Copelan	Pat Day	D. Wayne Lukas	William T. Young	1:10.80
1987	Over All	Ángel Cordero Jr.	D. Wayne Lukas	Eugene V. Klein	1:10.60
1986	Sacahuista	Chris McCarron	D. Wayne Lukas	Lloyd R. French Jr.	1:11.00
1985	Nervous Baba	Jorge Velásquez	D. Wayne Lukas	Eugene V. Klein	1:09.60
1984	Contredance	Eddie Maple	Woody Stephens	Henryk de Kwiatkowski	1:10.40
1983	Buzz My Bell	Jorge Velásquez	James J. Toner	Caesar P. Kimmel	1:12.40
1982	Jelly Bean Holiday	Jeffrey Fell	Herb Stevens	James H. Gallagher	1:10.80
1981	Thrilld N Delightd	Jorge Velásquez	Joseph H. Pierce Jr.	Sheila Pierce	1:10.80
1980	Sweet Revenge	Jorge Velásquez	Del W. Carroll	William S. Farish III	1:10.40
1979	Smart Angle	Sam Maple	Woody Stephens	Ryehill Farm	1:11.00
1978	Whisper Fleet	Jean Cruguet	Thomas J. Kelly	Townsend B. Martin	1:10.00
1977	L'Alezane	Ron Turcotte	Yonnie Starr	Jean-Louis Levesque	1:10.60
1976	Harvest Girl	Jean Cruguet	John P. Campo	Elmendorf Farm	1:11.20
1975	Optimistic Gal	Braulio Baeza	LeRoy Jolley	Diana M. Firestone	1:11.20
1974	Laughing Bridge	Laffit Pincay Jr.	Al Scotti	Neil Hellman	1:10.80
1973	Talking Picture	Braulio Baeza	John P. Campo	Elmendorf Farm	1:11.00
1972	Faithful Girl	Carlos Marquez	John P. Campo	Buckland Farm	1:11.80
1971	Debby Deb	Eddie Belmonte	John W. Jacobs	Nelson Bunker Hunt	1:10.20
1970	Dutiful	Laffit Pincay Jr.	James W. Maloney	William Haggin Perry	1:10.80
1969	Meritus	Manuel Ycaza	Woody Stephens	James Cox Brady	1:12.60
1968	Process Shot	Chuck Baltazar	J. Bowes Bond	Elberon Farm	1:10.40
1967	Wildwook	Heliodoro Gustines	John A. Nerud	Joseph M. Roebling	1:11.60
1966	Tainted Lady	Eddie Belmonte	Randy Sechrest	Ewing Kauffman	1:12.60
1965	Lady Dulcinea	Michael Carrozella	Woodrow Sedlacek	Jacques D. Wimpfheimer	1:11.60
1964	Candalita	Braulio Baeza	James P. Conway	Darby Dan Farm	1:10.80
1963	Petite Rouge	Johnny Sellers	Woodrow Sedlacek	Jacques D. Wimpfheimer	1:13.00
1962	Fashion Verdict	Hedley Woodhouse	James E. Fitzsimmons	Ogden Phipps	1:13.00
1955	Dark Charger	Anthony DeSpirito	Odie Clelland	Helen W. Kellogg	1:04.40
1954	Hidden Ship	Jimmy Nichols	not found	Starr Ranch	1:05.80
1953	Riant	Ted Atkinson	Preston M. Burch	Brookmeade Stable	1:05.40

== Earlier winners ==
- 1945 – Rytina
- 1944 – Busher
- 1943 – Fire Sticky
- 1942 – La Reigh
- 1941 – Romping Home
- 1940 – Tangled
- 1939 – Rosetown
- 1938 – Matterhorn
- 1937 – Creole Maid
- 1936 – Juliet W.
- 1935 – Beanie M
- 1934 – Bird Flower
- 1933 – Sun Celtic
- 1932 – Speed Boat
- 1931 – Brocado
- 1930 – Ladana
- 1929 – War Saint
- 1928 – The Worker
- 1927 – One Hour
- 1926 – Friedjof Nansen
- 1925 – Blockhead
- 1924 – Cloudland
- 1923 – Elvina
- 1922 – Cartoonist
- 1921 – Oil Man
- 1920 – Exodus
- 1919 – Grayssian
- 1918 – Routledge
- 1917 – Happy Go Lucky
- 1916 – Ultimatum
- 1915 – Friar Rock
- 1914 – Lady Barbary
- 1913 – Little Nephew
- 1910 – Zeus
- 1909 – Scarpia
- 1908 – Sea Cliff
- 1907 – Beaucoup
- 1906 – Salvidere
- 1905 – Tangle
- 1904 – Broadcloth
- 1903 – Sweet Gretchen
- 1902 – Molly Brant
- 1901 – Smart Set
