= Alcibiades Stakes =

- Class: Grade I
- Location: Keeneland Race Course; Lexington, Kentucky, United States
- Inaugurated: 1952
- Race type: Thoroughbred – Flat racing
- Website: www.keeneland.com

Race information
- Distance: 1 1/16 miles (8.5 furlongs)
- Surface: Dirt
- Track: left-handed
- Qualification: Two-year-old fillies
- Weight: 1952–1978 :119 lbs 1979–present : 118 lbs
- Purse: $650,000

The Alcibiades Stakes is an American Thoroughbred horse race run annually in early October at Keeneland Race Course in Lexington, Kentucky. A Grade I race, it is open to two-year-old fillies willing to race one and one-sixteenth miles on the dirt. Sponsored by Darley Racing since 2003, the Alcibiades Stakes was named for Hal Price Headley's great foundation mare Alcibiades.

The race is currently part of the Breeders' Cup Challenge series. The winner will automatically qualify for the Breeders' Cup Juvenile Fillies.

The race obtained Graded stakes race status in 1973 and was a Grade III race through 1975, a Grade II from 1976 through 2006 and elevated in 2007 to Grade I status with a current purse of $650,000.

Inaugurated in 1952 as a seven furlong race, from 1956 through 1980 it was run at seven furlongs, 184 feet. In 1981 it was changed to its present distances of 1 1/16 miles.

The Alcibiades Stakes was raced on dirt until 2006 when Keeneland Race Course installed the synthetic Polytrack surface. In 2014, the Polytrack was replaced by a new dirt surface.

== Records ==
Time record: (at present distance of 1 1/16 miles)

- 1:42.80 – Silverbulletday (1998)

Most wins by an owner

- 4 – Leslie Combs II (1957, 1967, 1978. 1983)

Most wins by a jockey

- 3 – Don Brumfield (1968, 1972, 1982)
- 3 – Rafael Bejarano (2004, 2007, 2010)

Most wins by a trainer

- 6 – D. Wayne Lukas (1983, 1988, 1989, 1993, 1995, 2003)

== Winners ==
| Year | Winner | Jockey | Trainer | Owner | Distance | Time | Gr. |
|---|---|---|---|---|---|---|---|
| 2026 | Emphatic | Tyler Gaffalione | Brendan P. Walsh | Gainesway Stable & Andrew Rosen | 11/16 m | 1:43.40 | I |
| 2025 | Tommy Jo | John R. Velazquez | Todd Pletcher | Spendthrift Farm | 11/16 m | 1:44.69 | I |
| 2024 | Immersive | Manny Franco | Brad H. Cox | Godolphin | 11/16 m | 1:44.64 | I |
| 2023 | Candied | Luis Saez | Todd Pletcher | Eclipse Thoroughbred Partners | 11/16 m | 1:44.17 | I |
| 2022 | Wonder Wheel | Tyler Gaffalione | Mark E. Casse | D.J. Stable LLC | 11/16 m | 1:45.17 | I |
| 2021 | JuJu's Map | Florent Geroux | Brad H. Cox | Albaugh Family Stables | 11/16 m | 1:43.52 | I |
| 2020 | Simply Ravishing | Luis Saez | Kenneth McPeek | Harold Lerner LLC, Magdalena Racing (Sherri McPeek), Nehoc Stables (Jack Cohen) | 11/16 m | 1:43.58 | I |
| 2019 | British Idiom | Javier Castellano | Brad H. Cox | Michael Dubb, Elkstone Group, Madaket Stables, Bethlehem Stables | 11/16 m | 1:45.80 | I |
| 2018 | Restless Rider | Brian Hernandez Jr. | Kenneth McPeek | Fern Circle Stables & Three Chimneys Farm LLC | 11/16 m | 1:44.23 | I |
| 2017 | Heavenly Love | Julien Leparoux | Mark E. Casse | Debby Oxley | 11/16 m | 1:45.32 | I |
| 2016 | Dancing Rags | Angel Cruz | H. Graham Motion | Chadds Ford Stable | 11/16 m | 1:44.69 | I |
| 2015 | Gomo | Mario Gutierrez | Doug F. O'Neill | Reddam Racing | 11/16 m | 1:45.55 | I |
| 2014 | Peace And War | Julien Leparoux | Olly Stevens | Qatar Racing Limited (Fahad Al Thani) | 11/16 m | 1:44.86 | I |
| 2013 | My Conquestadory | Eurico Rosa Da Silva | Mark E. Casse | Conquest Stables (Ernie Semersky & Dory Newell) | 11/16 m | 1:45.61 | I |
| 2012 | Spring in the Air | Patrick Husbands | Mark E. Casse | John C. Oxley | 11/16 m | 1:44.33 | I |
| 2011 | Stephanie's Kitten | John Velazquez | Wayne Catalano | Ken & Sarah Ramsey | 11/16 m | 1:43.12 | I |
| 2010 | Wickedly Perfect | Rafael Bejarano | Doug O'Neill | STD Racing et al. | 11/16 m | 1:46.26 | I |
| 2009 | Negligee | Rajiv Maragh | John Terranova | Sovereign Stable (partnership) | 11/16 m | 1:43.76 | I |
| 2008 | Dream Empress | Robby Albarado | Kenneth McPeek | Livin The Dream Racing LLC | 11/16 m | 1:43.82 | I |
| 2007 | Country Star | Rafael Bejarano | Robert J. Frankel | Stonerside Stable | 11/16 m | 1:45.85 | I |
| 2006 | Bel Air Beauty | Fernando Jara | Frank L. Brothers | W. Bruce Lunsford | 11/16 m | 1:45.32 | II |
| 2005 | She Says It Best | Eddie Martin Jr. | Vickie L. Foley | Carl Bowling/Foley, et al. | 11/16 m | 1:49.07 | II |
| 2004 | Runway Model | Rafael Bejarano | Bernard S. Flint | Naveed Chowhan | 11/16 m | 1:44.31 | II |
| 2003 | Be Gentle | Cornelio Velásquez | D. Wayne Lukas | Thomas F. Van Meter II | 11/16 m | 1:45.51 | II |
| 2002 | Westerly Breeze | Robby Albarado | Carl Nafzger | A. Stevens Miles Jr. | 11/16 m | 1:46.90 | II |
| 2001 | Take Charge Lady | Anthony J. D'Amico | Kenneth McPeek | Select Stable | 11/16 m | 1:46.23 | II |
| 2000 | She's A Devil Due | Mark Guidry | Kenneth McPeek | Brian Griggs & Mike Goetz | 11/16 m | 1:44.80 | II |
| 1999 | Scratch Pad | Willie Martinez | Joseph Waunsch | Jaime S. Carrion | 11/16 m | 1:44.00 | II |
| 1998 | Silverbulletday | Gary Stevens | Bob A. Baffert | Mike Pegram | 11/16 m | 1:42.20 | II |
| 1997 | Countess Diana | Shane Sellers | Patrick B. Byrne | M/M Richard Kaster | 11/16 m | 1:45.20 | II |
| 1996 | Southern Playgirl | Randy Romero | Harvey L. Vanier | Nancy A. Vanier | 11/16 m | 1:46.80 | II |
| 1995 | Cara Rafaela | Pat Day | D. Wayne Lukas | TNT Stud | 11/16 m | 1:44.40 | II |
| 1994 | Post It | Sam Maple | Ronald Allen Sr. | Jerry Campbell | 11/16 m | 1:46.20 | II |
| 1993 | Stellar Cat | Shane Sellers | D. Wayne Lukas | Overbrook Farm | 11/16 m | 1:44.60 | II |
| 1992 | Eliza | Patrick Valenzuela | Alex L. Hassinger Jr. | Allen E. Paulson | 11/16 m | 1:43.20 | II |
| 1991 | Spinning Round | Joe Johnson | James E. Baker | Kinsman Stable | 11/16 m | 1:47.20 | II |
| 1990 | Private Treasure | Jerry D. Bailey | Joseph H. Pierce Jr. | Pastime Stable | 11/16 m | 1:43.80 | II |
| 1989 | Special Happening | José A. Santos | D. Wayne Lukas | Eugene V. Klein | 11/16 m | 1:44.60 | II |
| 1988 | Wonders Delight | Gary Stevens | D. Wayne Lukas | Eugene V. Klein | 11/16 m | 1:46.40 | II |
| 1987 | Terra Incognita | Darrell Foster | Michael Ball | Robert C. Billips | 11/16 m | 1:44.60 | II |
| 1986 | Zero Minus | Sandy Hawley | Carl Nafzger | William H. Floyd | 11/16 m | 1:45.20 | II |
| 1985 | Silent Account | Keith Allen | H. Allen Jerkens | Centennial Farms | 11/16 m | 1:46.20 | II |
| 1984 | Foxy Deen | Daryl Montoya | Ronnie Warren | Elmer E. Miller | 11/16 m | 1:45.60 | II |
| 1983 | Lucky Lucky Lucky | Jacinto Vásquez | D. Wayne Lukas | Leslie Combs II & Equites Stable | 11/16 m | 1:47.00 | II |
| 1982 | Jelly Bean Holiday | Don Brumfield | Herbert K. Stevens | Mrs. James H. Gallagher | 11/16 m | 1:45.80 | II |
| 1981 | Apalachee Honey | Bill Shoemaker | Timothy J. Muckler | Muckler Stables | 11/16 m | 1:45.20 | II |
| 1980 | Sweet Revenge | Jorge Velásquez | Del W. Carroll | William S. Farish III | 7 f | 1:28.00 | II |
| 1979 | Salud | Julio C. Espinoza | William C. Thomas | Phillip Hurley, et al. | 7 f | 1:28.20 | II |
| 1978 | Angel Island | Eddie Delahoussaye | Ray Lawrence Jr. | Leslie Combs II | 7 f | 1:26.40 | II |
| 1977 | L'Alezane | Ron Turcotte | Joseph "Yonnie" Starr | Jean-Louis Levesque | 7 f | 1:27.20 | II |
| 1976 | Sans Supplement | William Gavidia | Donald M. McKellar | Donald M. McKellar | 7 f | 1:27.60 | II |
| 1975 | Optimistic Gal | Darrel McHargue | LeRoy Jolley | Diana M. Firestone | 7 f | 1:28.00 | III |
| 1974 | Hope of Glory | Jimmy Nichols | Donald M. McKellar | Donald M. McKellar | 7 f | 1:27.20 | III |
| 1973 | City Girl | Earlie Fires | Frank Catrone | Ada L. Rice | 7 f | 1:27.80 | III |
| 1972 | Coraggioso | Don Brumfield | Anthony L. Basile | Bwamazon Farm | 7 f | 1:27.00 | |
| 1971 | Mrs. Cornwallis | Gerardo Mora | Harry Shillick | Dogwood Stable | 7 f | 1:28.40 | |
| 1970 | Patelin | Laffit Pincay Jr. | Sylvester Veitch | George D. Widener Jr. | 7 f | 1:27.00 | |
| 1969 | Belle Noire | Heriberto Arroyo | Stanley M. Rieser | Andrew P. & Dan H. Gehl | 7 f | 1:27.20 | |
| 1968 | Lil's Bag | Don Brumfield | Ronnie Warren | M/M Robert F. Roberts | 7 f | 1:28.40 | |
| 1967 | Lady Tramp | Ismael Valenzuela | Richard J. Fischer | Leslie Combs II | 7 f | 1:28.00 | |
| 1966 | Teacher's Art | Laffit Pincay Jr. | Julius E. Tinsley Jr. | Fred W. Hooper | 7 f | 1:28.40 | |
| 1965 | Moccasin | Larry Adams | Harry Trotsek | Claiborne Farm | 7 f | 1:25.80 | |
| 1964 | Fairway Fun | Jack Leonard | T. M. Crowe | William H. Floyd | 7 f | 1:26.40 | |
| 1963 | Secret Veil | William D. Lucas | Strother E. Griffin | Reverie Knoll Farm (Freeman Keyes) | 7 f | 1:27.40 | |
| 1962 | Abrogate | Robert L. Baird | Burton B. Williams | Hugh A. Grant | 7 f | 1:27.20 | |
| 1961 | Journalette | Willie Carstens | S. Bryant Ott | Fourth Estate Stable | 7 f | 1:27.20 | |
| 1960 | Little Tumbler | Ray Broussard | William R. Mitchell | Bruno Ferrari | 7 f | 1:26.60 | |
| 1959 | Rash Statement | John L. Rotz | Allen R. Hultz | Hal Price Headley | 7 f | 1:25.60 | |
| 1958 | Fiji | Jimmy Nichols | Lloyd P. Tate | Mrs. Lloyd P. Tate | 7 f | 1:28.00 | |
| 1957 | Moon Glory | John Heckmann | S. Bryant Ott | Leslie Combs II | 7 f | 1:27.20 | |
| 1956 | Leallah | Sam Boulmetis Sr. | MacKenzie Miller | Charlton Clay | 7 f | 1:27.00 | |
| 1955 | Doubledogdare | Steve Brooks | Moody Jolley | Claiborne Farm | 7 f | 1:24.20 | |
| 1954 | Myrtle's Jet | Walter Blum | Ike K. Mourar | Maine Chance Farm | 7 f | 1:23.00 | |
| 1953 | Oil Painting | Al Popara | Anthony W. Rupelt | Mrs. Joseph A. Goodwin | 7 f | 1:24.40 | |
| 1952 | Sweet Patootie | Sherman Armstrong | H. H. "Pete" Battle | Mrs. E. E. Dale Shaffer | 7 f | 1:23.60 | |

== See also ==
- Road to the Kentucky Oaks
