= Aisco Stable =

Aisco Stable was the nom de course for the Thoroughbred racing stable owned by Abraham I. "Butch" Savin, a Chesterfield, Connecticut native and owner of construction conglomerate Aisco Construction.

The stable is best known as the owner of Mr. Prospector, the outstanding stallion who was the Leading sire in North America in 1987 and 1988 plus the Leading broodmare sire in North America from 1997 through 2003 and again in 2005 and 2006. In 2007, Eclipse Press published a book titled Gold Rush : How Mr. Prospector Became Racing's Billion-Dollar Sire by Avalyn Hunter, a prominent American equine author who is widely referenced at Wikipedia.

On the racetrack, Forward Gal, bred by Savin and trained by future U.S. Racing Hall of Fame inductee Jimmy Croll, was Aisco's most successful runner who was voted the 1970 American Champion Two-Year-Old Filly. His grandson, Scott Savin, has continued the tradition by owning his own racehorses such as Technology, the Florida Derby winner of 1992. Two of his great granddaughters, Tammy and Jessie Savin, are the youngest owners ever to win a stake race with a horse named Glory's Winner in 1992.
