= Longfellow Stakes =

- Class: Ungraded stakes
- Location: Monmouth Park Racetrack; Oceanport, New Jersey, United States
- Inaugurated: 1952
- Race type: Thoroughbred - Flat racing
- Website: www.monmouthpark.com

Race information
- Distance: Six furlong sprint
- Surface: Dirt
- Track: left-handed
- Qualification: Three-years-old & up
- Weight: Three-year-olds: 117 lbs; Older: 123 lbs., allowances
- Purse: $70,000

The Longfellow Stakes is an American Thoroughbred horse race run each year in early June at Monmouth Park Racetrack in Oceanport, New Jersey. A six furlong sprint for either gender aged three and up, the ungraded Longfellow offers a purse of $70,000 and a trophy.

The race, inaugurated in 1952, began as an eight furlong event. From 1963 to 1967 it went off at 8 1/2 furlongs. In 1968 it stretched out to nine furlongs and remained at that distance until 1996. In 1997, it became a six furlong race.

The Longfellow is named for the U.S. Racing Hall of Fame inductee, Longfellow, one of America's great racehorses as well as one of the great stallions of the 19th century.

== Records ==
In 2000, Delaware Township set a new stakes record of 1:07.84 while equaling the track record set in 1992 by Gilded Time.

== Winners since 2000 ==
Year	Winner	Age	Jockey	Trainer	Owner	Time
2011	Sean Avery	5	Joe Bravo	Allen Iwinski	Black Swan Stable	1:09.27
2010						
2009	Go Go Shoot	4	Eddie Castro	Bruce N. Levine	Repole Stable	1:07.85
2008	Mr. Umphrey	6	Eddie Castro	Richard Dutrow, Jr.	Four Roses Thoroughbred	1:09.41
2007	Wildeyed Dreamer	4	Chuck Lopez	Scott A. Lake	Charles W. Everett	1:09.30
2006	Joey P.	4	Joe Bravo	Ben W. Perkins, Jr.	John Petrini	1:03.24
2005	Don Six	5	Aaron Gryder	Scott A. Lake	Patricia A. Generazio	1:09.03
2004	Canadian Frontier	5	Edgar Prado	Stanley M. Hough	Mrs. E. Paul Robsham	1:08.98
2003	It's a Monster	4	Joe Bravo	Ben W. Perkins, Jr.	New Farm	1:09.66
2002	Impeachthepro	5	Dale Beckner	M. Anthony Ferraro	N. Laneve/W. Warner/Ferraro	1:09.53
2001	Max's Pal	4	Rick Wilson	Ben W. Perkins, Jr.	Raymond Dweck	1:09:04
2000	Delaware Township	4	Joe Bravo	Ben W. Perkins, Jr.	New Farm	1:07.84

== Earlier winners ==
- 1999 - My Jeffs Mombo
- 1998 - Buffalo Dan
- 1997 - Basqueian
- 1996 - Ops Smile
- 1995 - Boyce
- 1994 - Winnetou
- 1993 - First And Only
- 1992 - Futurist
- 1991 - Thunder Regent
- 1990 - Great Normand
- 1989 - Double Booked
- 1988 - Triteamtri
- 1987 - Owens Troupe
- 1986 - I'm A Banker
- 1985 - Cozzene
- 1984 - Tough Mickey
- 1983 - John's Gold
- 1982 - Gilded Age
- 1981 - Data Swap
- 1980 - Foretake
- 1979 - Dan Horn
- 1978 - Dan Horn
- 1977 - Quick Card
- 1976 - Landscaper
- 1975 - Bucks Bid
- 1974 - Northern Fling
- 1973 - Dartsum
- 1972 - Good Counsel
- 1971 - Matto Grosso
- 1970 - Ribofilio
- 1969 - Jean-Pierre
- 1968 - More Scents
- 1967 - War Censor
- 1966 - In Zeal
- 1965 - Turbo Jet II
- 1964 - Parka
- 1963 - Parka
- 1962 - Royal Record
- 1961 - Call The Witness
- 1960 - Julmar
- 1959 - Lil Fella
- 1958 - Tudor Era
- 1957 - Combustion
- 1956 - Prince Morvi
- 1955 - County Clare
- 1954 - News Again
- 1953 - Thasian Hero
- 1952 - Crocodile
