= Goodwood Stakes =

- Class: Grade I
- Location: Santa Anita Park; Arcadia, California, United States
- Inaugurated: 1982
- Race type: Thoroughbred - Flat racing
- Website: Santa Anita

Race information
- Distance: 1 1/8 miles
- Surface: Dirt
- Track: left-handed
- Qualification: Three-year-olds and older
- Weight: Base weights with allowances: 4-year-olds and up: 126 lbs. 3-year-olds: 122 lbs.
- Purse: US$302,000 (2026)
- Bonuses: Breeders' Cup "Win and You're In" - Breeders' Cup Classic

The Goodwood Stakes is a Grade I American Thoroughbred horse race for horses aged three years old or older over the distance of one and one-eighth miles on the dirt, scheduled annually in September at Santa Anita Park in Arcadia, California.

== History ==
The race was inaugurated in 1982 as the Goodwood Handicap, run by the Oak Tree Racing Association meeting at Santa Anita Park. It was created as a result of a partnership between Oak Tree and Goodwood Racecourse in Chichester, England.

The event was run at 1 1/16 miles in 1982, 1983, 1984 and 1986.

In 1985 the event was classified by the American Graded Stakes Committee as Grade III and was upgraded to Grade II status in 1990.

Between 1996 and 2006 the Breeders' Cup sponsored the event, which reflected in the race name.

In 2012 the event was upgraded to Grade I and was renamed to the Awesome Again Stakes in honor of the Canadian-bred 1998 Breeders' Cup Classic winner Awesome Again. Awesome Again's son, Game On Dude, won the race in 2011 and 2012.

In 2024 the event was rebranded with other events on the card as the California Crown Stakes, the main race of California Crown day, with a purse of $1 million. The following year track officials announced that California Crown day would be paused and, consequentially, the race would revert back to its original name as the Goodwood Stakes. The purse for the 2025 Goodwood Stakes was decreased back to $300,000

== Records ==
Time record:

- 1 1/8 miles: 1:46.72 - Bertrando (1994)
- 1 1/16 miles: 1:40.20 - Cajun Prince (1982)

Margins:

- 5 1/4 lengths - Smooth Roller (2015)

Most wins:

- 2 - Lord At War (ARG) (1984, 1985)
- 2 - Pleasantly Perfect (2002, 2003)
- 2 - Game On Dude (2011, 2012)

Most wins by an owner:

- 2 - Peter Perkins (1984, 1985)
- 2 - Diamond A Racing (2002, 2003)
- 2 - WinStar Farm (2008, 2020)
- 2 - Family Trust Diamond Pride, Lanni Family Trust, Mercedes Stable & Bernie Schiappa (2011, 2012)

Most wins by a jockey:

- 5 - Gary Stevens (1988, 1994, 1998, 2005, 2013)

Most wins by a trainer:

- 9 - Bob Baffert (1998, 2010, 2011, 2012, 2017, 2020, 2021, 2022, 2025)

== Winners ==
Year	Winner	Age	Jockey	Trainer	Owner	Distance	Time	Purse	Grade	Ref
At Santa Anita Park – Goodwood Stakes
2026	Forged Steel	4	Edwin Gonzalez	Saffie A. Joseph Jr.	C2 Racing Stable, Mathis Stables & TCC Stables	1 1/8 miles	1:48.48	$302,000	I	
2025	Nevada Beach	3	Mike E. Smith	Bob Baffert	Michael E. Pagram, Karl Watson, and Paul Weitman	1 1/8 miles	1:48.43	$300,500	I	
California Crown Stakes
2024	Subsanador (ARG)	5	Mike E. Smith	Richard E. Mandella	Wathnan Racing	1 1/8 miles	1:48.68	$1,000,500	I	
Awesome Again Stakes
2023	Slow Down Andy	4	Mario Gutierrez	Doug F. O'Neill	Reddam Racing	1 1/8 miles	1:47.62	$302,000	I	
2022	Defunded	4	Edwin Maldonado	Bob Baffert	Karl Watson, Michael E. Pegram & Paul Weitman	1 1/8 miles	1:49.38	$301,500	I	
2021	Medina Spirit	3	John R. Velazquez	Bob Baffert	Zedan Racing Stables	1 1/8 miles	1:49.67	$301,500	I	
2020	Improbable	4	Drayden Van Dyke	Bob Baffert	WinStar Farm, China Horse Club & SF Racing	1 1/8 miles	1:49.01	$300,000	I	
2019	Mongolian Groom	4	Abel Cedillo	Enebish Ganbat	Mongolian Stable	1 1/8 miles	1:49.27	$300,351	I	
2018	Accelerate	5	Joel Rosario	John W. Sadler	Hronis Racing	1 1/8 miles	1:50.38	$300,690	I	
2017	Mubtaahij (IRE)	5	Drayden Van Dyke	Bob Baffert	Sheikh Mohammed bin Khalifa Al Maktoum	1 1/8 miles	1:51.32	$300,000	I	
2016	California Chrome	5	Victor Espinoza	Art Sherman	California Chrome LLC	1 1/8 miles	1:48.07	$300,000	I	
2015	Smooth Roller	4	Tyler Baze	Victor L. Garcia	Lucky Charm Stable	1 1/8 miles	1:48.08	$300,750	I	
2014	Shared Belief	3	Mike E. Smith	Jerry Hollendorfer	Jungle Racing, KMN Racing, Jerry Hollendorfer, Litt, Solis II & Todaro	1 1/8 miles	1:48.58	$300,500	I	
2013	Mucho Macho Man	5	Gary L. Stevens	Katherine Ritvo	Reeves Thoroughbred Racing	1 1/8 miles	1:48.30	$251,250	I	
2012	Game On Dude	5	Rafael Bejarano	Bob Baffert	Family Trust Diamond Pride, Lanni Family Trust, Mercedes Stable & Bernie Schiappa	1 1/8 miles	1:48.98	$250,000	I	
Goodwood Stakes
2011	Game On Dude	4	Chantal Sutherland	Bob Baffert	Family Trust Diamond Pride, Lanni Family Trust, Mercedes Stable & Bernie Schiappa	1 1/8 miles	1:47.36	$250,000	I	
At Hollywood Park – Goodwood Stakes
2010	Richard's Kid	5	Alonso Quinonez	Bob Baffert	Zabeel Racing International	1 1/8 miles	1:49.18	$250,000	I	
At Santa Anita Park – Goodwood Stakes
2009	Gitano Hernando (GB)	3	Kieren Fallon	Marco Botti	Team Valor & Gary Barber	1 1/8 miles	1:48.39	$305,000	I	
2008	Well Armed	5	Aaron Gryder	Eoin G. Harty	WinStar Farm	1 1/8 miles	1:47.11	$498,000	I	
2007	Tiago	3	Mike E. Smith	John Shirreffs	Jerry & Ann Moss	1 1/8 miles	1:46.93	$520,000	I	
At Santa Anita Park – Goodwood Handicap
2006	Lava Man	5	Corey Nakatani	Doug F. O'Neill	STD Racing Stable & Jason Wood	1 1/8 miles	1:48.15	$500,000	II	
2005	Rock Hard Ten	4	Gary L. Stevens	Richard E. Mandella	Mercedes Stables & Madeleine A. Pickens	1 1/8 miles	1:48.68	$484,000	II	
2004	Lundy's Liability (BRZ)	4	David R. Flores	Robert J. Frankel	TNT Stud & Mary Slack	1 1/8 miles	1:48.39	$480,000	II	
2003	Pleasantly Perfect	5	Alex O. Solis	Richard E. Mandella	Diamond A Racing	1 1/8 miles	1:48.37	$482,000	II	
2002	Pleasantly Perfect	4	Alex O. Solis	Richard E. Mandella	Diamond A Racing	1 1/8 miles	1:46.80	$500,000	II	
2001	Freedom Crest	5	Kent J. Desormeaux	Richard Baltas	Calvin Nguyen & Joey Tran	1 1/8 miles	1:48.86	$488,000	II	
2000	Tiznow	3	Chris McCarron	Jay M. Robbins	Michael Cooper & Cecilia Straub-Rubens	1 1/8 miles	1:47.38	$418,000	II	
1999	Budroyale	6	Garrett K. Gomez	Ted H. West	Jeffrey Sengara	1 1/8 miles	1:48.31	$498,000	II	
1998	Silver Charm	4	Gary L. Stevens	Bob Baffert	Bob & Beverly Lewis	1 1/8 miles	1:47.21	$446,000	II	
1997	Benchmark	6	Eddie Delahoussaye	Ronald W. Ellis	Pam & Martin J. Wygod	1 1/8 miles	1:47.60	$248,700	II	
1996	† Savinio	6	Corey Nakatani	Walter R. Greenman	Walter R. Greenman, Gary A. Biszantz & Gary S. Vandeweghe	1 1/8 miles	1:47.88	$303,300	II	
1995	Soul of the Matter	4	Kent J. Desormeaux	Richard E. Mandella	Burt Bacharach	1 1/8 miles	1:47.54	$256,950	II	
1994	Bertrando	5	Gary L. Stevens	John Shirreffs	Ed Nahem & 505 Farms	1 1/8 miles	1:46.72	$214,400	II	
1993	Lottery Winner	4	Kent J. Desormeaux	Jay M. Robbins	Ernest Auerbach	1 1/8 miles	1:47.71	$217,200	II	
1992	Reign Road	4	Kent J. Desormeaux	Jay M. Robbins	Jack Kent Cooke	1 1/8 miles	1:48.36	$215,200	II	
1991	The Prime Minister	4	Chris McCarron	Charles E. Whittingham	Bradley, Chandler & Seitz	1 1/8 miles	1:47.99	$264,800	II	
1990	Lively One	5	Alex O. Solis	Charles E. Whittingham	John G. Sikura (Lessee)	1 1/8 miles	1:48.00	$216,800	II	
1989	§ Present Value (CAN)	5	Eddie Delahoussaye	Jerry M. Fanning	Jerry Fanning, Richard Fontana, Jay Bligh, Gary Potter	1 1/8 miles	1:47.20	$218,800	III	
1988	Cutlass Reality	6	Gary L. Stevens	Craig Anthony Lewis	Howard Crash & James Hankoff	1 1/8 miles	1:47.20	$220,400	III	
1987	Ferdinand	4	Bill Shoemaker	Charles E. Whittingham	Mrs. Howard B. Keck	1 1/8 miles	1:50.80	$156,500	III	
1986	Super Diamond	6	Laffit Pincay Jr.	Edwin J. Gregson	Roland & Ramona Sahm	1 1/16 miles	1:41.20	$115,500	III	
1985	Lord At War (ARG)	5	Bill Shoemaker	Charles E. Whittingham	Peter Perkins (Lessee)	1 1/8 miles	1:50.40	$114,500	III	
1984	Lord At War (ARG)	4	Bill Shoemaker	Charles E. Whittingham	Peter Perkins (Lessee)	1 1/16 miles	1:42.00	$105,150		
1983	Pettrax	5	Kenneth D. Black	Wayne Charlton	Brent W. Charlton	1 1/16 miles	1:42.60	$80,400		
1982	Cajun Prince	5	Walter Guerra	Laz Barrera	Aaron U. Jones	1 1/16 miles	1:40.20	$80,350	III	

Legend:
All Weather Track Dirt
Notes: § Ran as an entry
† In the 1996 running Alphabet Soup won the race but was disqualified and placed third. Savinio was declared the winner.

== See also ==
List of American and Canadian Graded races

== External site ==
- 2015 Santa Anita Park Media Guide
- Find out more about the Awesome Again Stakes (formerly known as Goodwood) at Hello Race Fans!
