= Real Quiet Stakes =

The Real Quiet Stakes was an American Thoroughbred horse race run annually at Hollywood Park Racetrack in Inglewood, California. Open to two-year-olds, the stakes race is contested over a distance of 1 1/16 miles (8.5 furlongs) on Cushion Track synthetic dirt. Run in mid November, the race offered a purse of $100,000 Added.

Inaugurated in 2005, the race was named in honor of Real Quiet, the 1998 American Champion Three-Year-Old Male Horse and winner of that year's Kentucky Derby and Preakness Stakes. In 1999, Real Quiet won the Hollywood Gold Cup at Hollywood Park Racetrack.

== Records ==
Speed record:

- 1:42.25 - Chocolate Candy (2008)

== Winners ==
Year	Winner	Jockey	Trainer	Owner	Time
2013	Tamarando	Rafael Bejarano	Jerry Hollendorfer	Larry & Marianne Williams	1:44.22
2012	Carving	Martin Garcia	Bob Baffert	Pegasus Syndicate #4	1:46.04
2011	Liaison		Bob Baffert	Arnold Zetcher	1:44.72
2010	Comma to the Top	Corey Nakatani	Peter Miller	Barber, Birnbaum & Tsujihara	1:43.56
2009	NO RACE
2008	Chocolate Candy	Garrett Gomez	Jerry Hollendorfer	Jenny Craig	1:42.25
2007	Colonel John	Corey Nakatani	Eoin G. Harty	WinStar Farm	1:42.92
2006	Roman Commander	Isaias Enriquez	Gary Stute	Kerndall Mann	1:44.77
2005	Genre	Martin Pedroza	Ben Cecil	David & Paula Meuller	1:43.99
