= Wickerr Stakes =

Horse race

- Class: Restricted stakes
- Location: Del Mar Racetrack; Del Mar, California, United States
- Inaugurated: 1990
- Race type: Thoroughbred - Flat racing
- Website: www.dmtc.com

Race information
- Distance: 1 mile (8 furlongs)
- Surface: Turf
- Track: Left-handed
- Qualification: Three-years-old & up
- Weight: Allowance
- Purse: 85,500 (2021)

The Wickerr Stakes is an American Thoroughbred horse race held annually in mid-July at Del Mar Racetrack in Del Mar, California. A restricted stakes, it is limited to horses age three and older that are Non-Winners Of A Sweepstakes Of $50,000 Other Than State Bred. It is contested on turf over a distance of one mile (8 furlongs).

The race is named in honour of Wickerr , a horse who won a number of important races at Del Mar Racetrack for his prominent Rancho Santa Fe, California owner, Edmund A. Gann.

== Records ==
Speed record:

- 1:32.22 @ 1 mile: Touch of the Blues (2003)

Most wins:

- 2 - Becrux (2006, 2007)

Most wins by a jockey:

- 4 - Gary Stevens (1991, 2013, 2017, 2018)

Most wins by a trainer:

- 4 - Julio C. Canani (1991, 2002, 2005, 2010)

Most wins by an owner:

- 3 - Jack, Art, & J. R. Preston (2002, 2005, 2010)

== Winners ==
Year	Winner	Age	Jockey	Trainer	Owner	Dist. (Miles)	Time	Grade
2025	Almendares	5	Antonio Fresu	Philip D'Amato	CYBT, McLean Racing Stables, Saul Gevertz, Michael Nentwig, Ray Pagano	1 m	1:34.57	Listed/Restricted
2024	First Peace	4	Mike E. Smith	Mark Glatt	Rancho Temescal LLC, Red Baron’s Barn, LLC & Rodney Orr	1 m	1:33.81	Listed/Restricted
2023	Du Jour	5	Juan Hernandez	Bob Baffert	Natalie Baffert & Debbie Lanni	1 m	1:34.13	Listed/Restricted
2022	Irideo	9	Hector I. Berrios	Marcelo Polanco	William DeBurgh	1 m	1:35.50	Listed/Restricted
2021	Neptune's Storm	5	Flavien Prat	Peter Miller	CYBT, Saul Gevertz, Lynn Gitomer, Mike Goetz, Michael Nentwig & Daniel Weiner	1 m	1:35.56	
2020	Bob and Jackie	4	Heriberto J. Figueroa	Richard Baltas	Zayat Stables LLC	1 m	1:33.36	
2019	Bombard	6	Flavien Prat	Richard E. Mandella	Claiborne Farm, Ramona & Perry R. Bass II, Adele Dilschneider	1 m	1:34.44	
2018	Double Touch	4	Gary Stevens	Dan Blacker	Radley Equine, Inc., Roadrunner Racing, Rick Gold, Scott MacDonald, Ken Smole	1 m	1:33.61	
2017	Blackjackcat	4	Gary Stevens	Mark Glatt	Al & Saundra Kirkwood	1 m	1:35.20	
2016	Toowindytohaulrox	5	Tiago Pereira	Philip D'Amato	Queen Bee Racing	1 m	1:36.09	
2015	Pure Tactics	6	Flavien Prat	Doug F. O'Neill	Nita Winner	1 m	1:34.78	
2014	Lil Bit O'Fun	6	Aaron Gryder	Philip D'Amato	Philip Belmonte, Henry Cohen, Mark Gorman, Sterling Stables	1 m	1:32.35	
2013	Indy Point	4	Gary Stevens	Richard E. Mandella	Gus-May-Fer (Felipe Lovisi)	1 m	1:32.74	
2012	Suggestive Boy	4	Joseph Talamo	Ron McAnally	Pozo de Luna, Inc.	1 m	1:33.21	
2011	Calimonco	5	Victor Espinoza	John Sadler	Pam & Martin Wygod	1 m	1:34.07	
2010	Blue Chagall	5	David Flores	Julio C. Canani	Prestonwood Racing (Jack, Art, & J. R. Preston)	1 m	1:34.19	
2009	Colonel John	4	Garrett Gomez	Eoin G. Harty	WinStar Farm	1 m	1:32.77	
2008	One Union	5	Victor Espinoza	Richard E. Mandella	Herman Sarkowsky	1 m	1:34.09	
2007	Becrux	5	David Flores	Neil D. Drysdale	Team Valor & Gary Barber	1 m	1:33.04	
2006	Becrux	4	Corey Nakatani	Neil D. Drysdale	Team Valor & Gary Barber	1 m	1:34.31	
2005	Tsigane	6	Garrett Gomez	Julio C. Canani	Prestonwood Farm (Jack, Art, & J. R. Preston)	1 m	1:32.23	
2004	Statement	6	Javier Santiago	Kristin Mulhall	Bienstock & Winner Stables	1 m	1:33.35	
2003	Touch of the Blues	6	Kent Desormeaux	Neil D. Drysdale	Maktoum bin Rashid Al Maktoum	1 m	1:32.22	
2002	Special Ring	5	David Flores	Julio C. Canani	Prestonwood Farm (Jack, Art, & J. R. Preston)	1 m	1:32.72	
2001	Thady Quill	4	Eddie Delahoussaye	Robert J. Frankel	Gary Seidler	1 m	1:35.02	
2000	Riviera †	6	Chris McCarron	Robert J. Frankel	Edmund A. Gann	1 m	1:34.20	
1999	Crystal Hearted	5	Brice Blanc	Ben D. A. Cecil	Mrs. C. Michael Poland	1 m	1:33.15	
1998	Joe Who	5	Emile Ramsammy	Bob Baffert	James Helzer	1 m	1:33.40	
1997	Mufattish	4	Eddie Delahoussaye	Neil D. Drysdale	Shadwell Stable	1 m	1:36.60	
1996	Megan's Interco	7	Corey Nakatani	Jenine Sahadi	Milton M. Bronson	1 m	1:34.33	
1995	Royal Chariot	5	Laffit Pincay Jr.	Edwin J. Gregson	Dorothy & Vincent Kanowsky	1 m	1:34.80	
1994	Bertrando	5	Pat Valenzuela	John Shirreffs	Ed Nahem & 505 Farms	1 m	1:36.20	
1993	Slew of Damascus	5	Corey Nakatani	Craig G. Roberts	Edris Harbeston, George Losh, Victor Naccarato	1 m	1:34.03	
1992	Luthier Enchanteur	5	Pat Valenzuela	Robert J. Frankel	Edmund A. Gann	1-1/16 m	1:42.60	
1991	Blaze O'Brien	4	Gary Stevens	Julio C. Canani	Barry & Susan Isaacs	1 m	1:35.20	
1990	Companion	5	Corey Black	Richard J. Lundy	Allen E. Paulson	1-1/8 m	1:49.00	

* † In 2000, American Spirit won but was disqualified to second for bumping Riviera in the stretch.
