= Tiznow =

American Thoroughbred racehorse

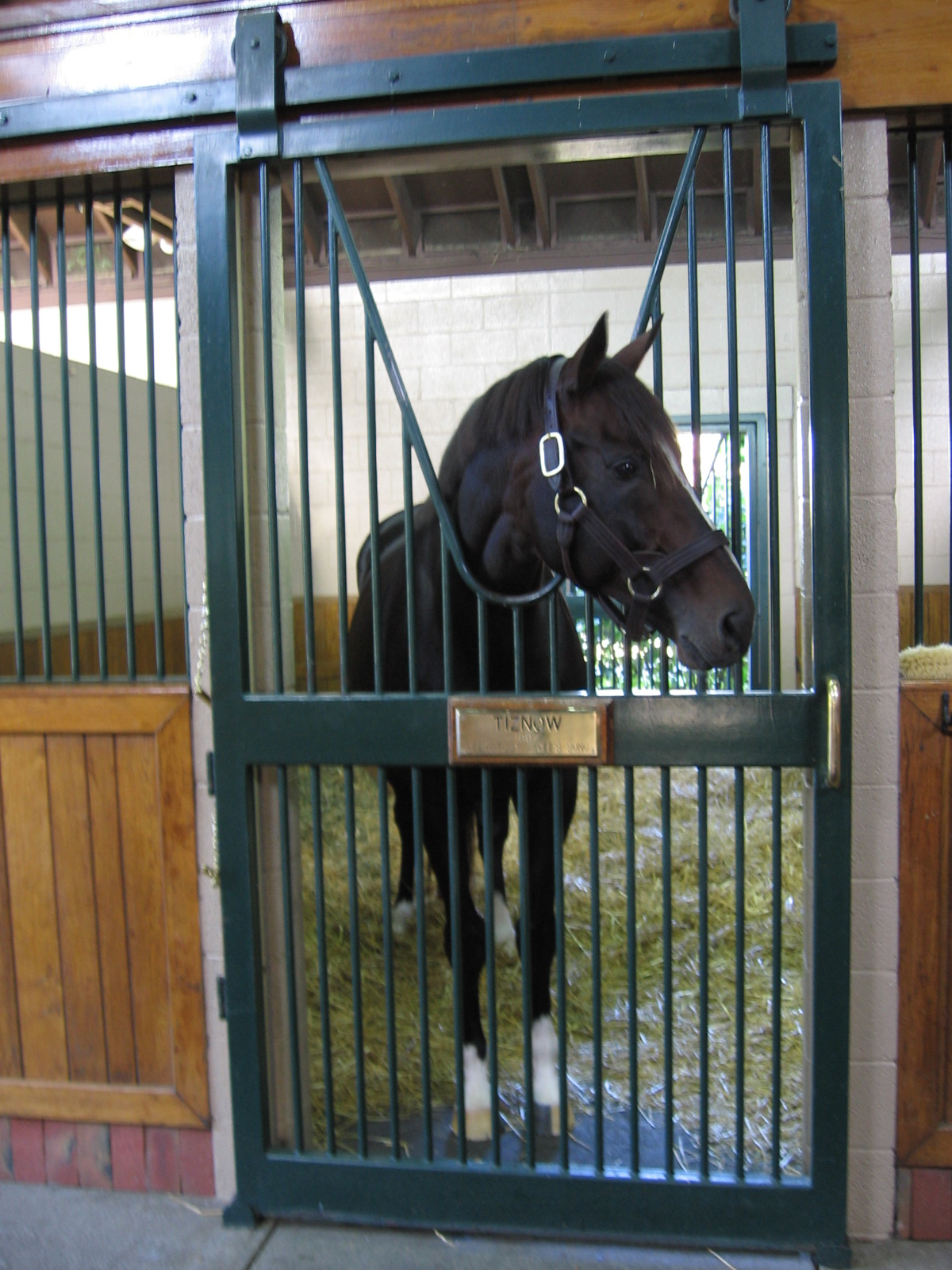
- Tiznow standing at Winstar Farms, Kentucky
- Sire: Cee's Tizzy
- Grandsire: Relaunch
- Dam: Cee's Song
- Damsire: Seattle Song
- Sex: Stallion
- Foaled: 1997
- Country: United States
- Colour: Brown
- Breeder: Cecilia Straub-Rubens
- Owner: Cecilia Straub-Rubens and Michael Cooper (2000); Cees Stable (2001)
- Trainer: Jay M. Robbins
- Record: 15:8-4-2
- Earnings: $6,427,830

Major wins
- Affirmed Handicap (2000); Super Derby (2000); Goodwood Breeders' Cup Handicap (2000); San Fernando Breeders' Cup Stakes (2001); Santa Anita Handicap (2001) Breeders' Cup wins: Breeders' Cup Classic (2000 & 2001)

Awards
- American Horse of the Year (2000); American Champion 3-Year-Old Male Horse (2000); California Horse of the Year (2000, 2001); NTRA "Moment of the Year" (2000, 2001); American Champion Older Male Horse (2001)

Honours
- U.S. Racing Hall of Fame (2009); Tiznow Stakes at Santa Anita; Tiznow Handicap at Louisiana Downs

Tiznow (foaled March 12, 1997 in California) is an American Thoroughbred racehorse best known for his wins in the Breeders' Cup Classic in 2000 and 2001, becoming the only horse to win this race twice. He was the 2000 American Horse of the Year and was inducted into the National Museum of Racing and Hall of Fame in 2009.

== Background ==
Tiznow is a bay horse with a white tornado-shaped blaze and four white socks. A California bred, he was sired by Cee's Tizzy out of the Seattle Song mare Cee's Song. A full brother, Budroyale, finished second in the 1999 Breeders' Cup Classic. Tiznow's unraced full sister Tizamazing produced 2013 Preakness Stakes winner Oxbow, by the stallion Awesome Again.

Tiznow was trained by Jay Robbins and ridden by Chris McCarron in his major races. He was originally owned by his breeder, Cecilia Straub-Rubens, and Michael L. Cooper. When Straub-Rubens died shortly after the 2000 Breeders' Cup Classic, Tiznow's ownership was changed to Cee's Stable.

At maturity, he reached 16.3 hands (67 inches, 170 cm) high. His frame is rather angular but his conformation is generally correct.

Tiznow is known as a quirky horse. Especially towards the end of his career, he was sometimes reluctant to work in the mornings, including one occasion before the 2001 Breeders' Cup where he spent 40 minutes resisting jockey Chris McCarron's urging to break into a gallop. In the WinStar stallion barn, Tiznow learned how to unlatch his door to let himself out into the main hall. He does not like the feel of concrete on his feet and will adjust his steps so he does not have to walk over it. Tiznow also does not like cold weather and is usually kept inside if the temperature goes below freezing. "He's a California horse all the way," said Amy Nave, a bloodstock assistant at WinStar. "I think in a way it shows how intelligent he is."

== Racing career ==
Tiznow missed his two-year-old season due to a leg fracture.

=== 2000: three-year-old season ===
At three years old, it took Tiznow three tries to break his maiden, finally winning for the first time on May 31 by 8 1/2 lengths. In his next start, the Affirmed Handicap on July 1, he defeated grade 1 winner Dixie Union by a neck.

In his next start, the Swaps Stakes on July 23, Tiznow finished second behind Captain Steve after a troubled trip. In the Pacific Classic, Tiznow faced older horses for the first time and finished second when Skimming got an early lead and kicked clear of the field. This was the first time he was ridden by jockey Chris McCarron, who quickly learned that Tiznow disliked the whip and adjusted tactics accordingly. "From that point on, that’s the way I rode him. I didn’t hit him a whole lot. I just tried to encourage him to run by chirping to him and moving my hands, and if I felt it was necessary, to show him the stick and tap," McCarron said.

For his next race, Tiznow shipped to Louisiana for the $500,000 Super Derby, then a Grade One race. He won in gate to wire fashion by six lengths under a hand ride, breaking the track record for 1 1/8 miles.

Returning to California for the Goodwood Breeders' Cup Handicap, Tiznow grabbed the early lead and then withstood a challenge down the stretch from Captain Steve to win by 1/2 a length.

==== The 2000 Breeders' Cup Classic ====
Tiznow's final start of 2000 was in the Breeders' Cup Classic, held that year at Churchill Downs. Tiznow had to be supplemented to the field at a cost of $360,000 as he was not nominated as a foal. The field included Irish champion Giant's Causeway, Kentucky Derby winner Fusaichi Pegasus, Belmont Stakes winner Lemon Drop Kid, and Jockey Club Gold Cup winner Albert the Great. Tiznow and Albert the Great went to the early lead while being stalked by Giant's Causeway. As they entered the stretch, Albert the Great started to give way, but Giant's Causeway was closing fast on the outside. Giant's Causeway almost got even, but Tiznow rallied to win by a neck. The race was voted the NTRA Moment of the Year.

Days after the Breeders' Cup, Straub-Reubens died, leaving her share of the horse to her children. In January 2001, Tiznow received Eclipse Awards for 2000 Horse of the Year and Champion Three-Year-Old. He was the first California-bred to receive these honors since Swaps in 1956.

=== 2001: four-year-old season ===
Tiznow started his 4-year-old campaign by winning the San Fernando Breeders' Cup Stakes, then finishing second to Wooden Phone in the Strub Stakes.

At high weight in the Santa Anita Handicap, Tiznow dueled with Wooden Phone for a mile before drawing away to win by 5 lengths.

Tiznow then missed a good portion of the year due to back problems and came into the Classic off defeats in the Woodward Stakes and the Goodwood Handicap.

==== The 2001 Breeders' Cup Classic ====
The 2001 Breeders' Cup was held in October at Belmont Park, twelve miles away from Ground Zero and under heavy security. It was six weeks and four days after the terrorist attacks that took place just miles to the west in Lower Manhattan, but the 2001 Breeders' Cup went ahead as planned, with armed marksmen lining the rooftop at Belmont Park.

The field for the Classic included European superstars Galileo (Epsom Derby and Irish Derby winner), and Sakhee (Prix de l'Arc de Triomphe winner), who were both racing on dirt for the first time. The American runners were led by Aptitude, winner of three straight races including the Jockey Club Gold Cup. Tiznow was the fourth betting choice in a field of thirteen.

Tiznow tracked the leaders down the backstretch and made his move on the turn where he swung five wide. He dueled with Albert the Great but could not get by, and then both were overtaken mid-stretch by Sakhee. McCarron hit Tiznow once left-handed, and the horse responded with a final lunge to win by a nose as track announcer Tom Durkin called, "Tiznow wins it for America!" The race was again voted the NTRA Moment of the Year. Sakhee was a close second, and Albert the Great was two lengths back in third.

Tiznow is the only racehorse to win the Breeders' Cup Classic twice. He was inducted into racing's Hall of Fame in 2009.

=== Race record ===
Date	Track	Race (Grade)	Distance	Finish	Jockey	Winner (Runner-Up)
2000 (3-year-old season)
4/22/2000	Santa Anita Park	Maiden	6 Furlongs	6th	A. Solis	Mr. Wonderful
5/11/2000	Hollywood Park	Maiden	8 ½ Furlongs	2nd	A. Solis	Spicy Stuff
5/31/2000	Hollywood Park	Maiden	8 ½ Furlongs	1st	A. Solis	(Coldwater Canyon)
7/1/2000	Hollywood Park	Affirmed Handicap (G3)	8 ½ Furlongs	1st	V. Espinoza	(Dixie Union)
7/23/2000	Hollywood Park	Swaps Stakes (G1)	9 Furlongs	2nd	V. Espinoza	Captain Steve
8/26/2000	Del Mar	Pacific Classic (G1)	10 Furlongs	2nd	C. McCarron	Skimming
9/30/2000	Louisiana Downs	Super Derby (G1)	10 Furlongs	1st	C. McCarron	(Commendable)
10/15/2000	Santa Anita Park	Goodwood Breeders' Cup Handicap (G2)	9 Furlongs	1st	C. McCarron	(Captain Steve)
11/4/2000	Churchill Downs	Breeders' Cup Classic (G1)	10 Furlongs	1st	C. McCarron	(Giant's Causeway)
2001 (4-year-old season)
1/13/2001	Santa Anita Park	San Fernando Stakes (G2)	8 ½ Furlongs	1st	C. McCarron	(Walk Likes Duck)
2/3/2001	Santa Anita Park	Strub Stakes (G2)	9 Furlongs	2nd	C. McCarron	Wooden Phone
3/3/2001	Santa Anita Park	Santa Anita Handicap (G1)	10 Furlongs	1st	C. McCarron	(Wooden Phone)
9/8/2001	Belmont Park	Woodward Stakes (G1)	9 Furlongs	3rd	C. McCarron	Lido Palace
10/7/2001	Santa Anita Park	Goodwood Breeders' Cup Handicap (G2)	9 Furlongs	3rd	C. McCarron	Freedom Crest
10/27/2001	Belmont Park	Breeders' Cup Classic (G1)	10 Furlongs	1st	C. McCarron	(Sakhee)

== Retirement and stud career ==
Retired to stud at WinStar Farm, Tiznow was considered an uncertain stallion prospect due to his relatively modest California breeding. His pedigree is unusual for a horse; he is one of the few modern Thoroughbreds whose sire line does not end at the Darley Arabian. Tiznow is instead a direct male line descendant of Man o' War whose sire line traces back to the Godolphin Arabian. He is considered the best hope for the survival of this sire line into the 21st century.

He made a promising start to his career as a stallion, leading the freshman sire list in 2005. That first crop included 2005 Eclipse Award champion juvenile filly Folklore, who won the 2005 Breeders' Cup Juvenile Fillies. He was third on the American general sire list in 2008 and fourth in 2009. His progeny have typically needed some time to mature and most are best at a mile or more.

Tiznow has established himself as an important sire, particularly of classic distance types like 2008 Belmont Stakes winner Da'Tara, Well Armed, the winner of the 2009 Dubai World Cup, Colonel John, winner of the 2008 Travers Stakes and Gemologist, winner of the 2012 Wood Memorial Stakes. Tiznow is also a developing sire of sires, having at least 13 sons at stud in the U.S.

On October 21, 2020, WinStar Farm announced that Tiznow had been retired from stud duty. Calling him a wonderful stallion, WinStar director of bloodstock services said: "He's responsible for putting the farm on the map."

=== Notable progeny ===
Notable offspring of Tiznow include:

- Folklore (foaled 2003) — Matron Stakes and Breeders' Cup Juvenile Fillies winner
- Well Armed (2003) — Awesome Again Stakes and Dubai World Cup winner
- Bullsbay (2004) — Whitney Stakes winner
- Tough Tiz's Sis (2004) — Zenyatta Stakes and Ruffian Handicap winner
- Bear Now (2004) — Sovereign Award 2008 Champion Older Mare
- Colonel John (2005) — Santa Anita Derby and Travers Stakes winner
- Da' Tara (2005) — Belmont Stakes winner
- Tizway (2005) — Metropolitan Handicap and Whitney Stakes winner
- Mr Hot Stuff (2006) — Grand National Hurdle Stakes and A. P. Smithwick Memorial Steeplechase Stakes winner
- Morning Line (2007) — Carter Handicap winner
- Tiz Miz Sue (2007) — Ogden Phipps Handicap winner
- Gemologist (2009) — Kentucky Jockey Club Stakes and Wood Memorial Stakes winner
- My Sweet Addiction (2010) — Vanity Stakes winner
- Strong Mandate (2011) — Hopeful Stakes winner
- Dynamic Impact (2011) — Illinois Derby winner
- Tourist (2011) — Fourstardave Handicap and Breeders' Cup Mile winner
- Tiz Shea D (2012) — Indiana Derby winner
- Irap (2014) — Blue Grass Stakes, Ohio Derby, and Indiana Derby winner
- Tiz a Slam (2014) — Nijinsky Stakes, Ontario Derby, and Dominion Day Stakes winner
- Tiz Ardel (2014) — New Year Classic winner
- Sporting Chance (2015) — Hopeful Stakes winner
- Red Ruby (2015) — Black-Eyed Susan Stakes and Delaware Oaks winner
- Midnight Bourbon (2018) — Lecomte Stakes winner

Tiznow is also a top broodmare sire, known for transmitting stamina. Notable descendants as a broodmare sire include:

- Come Dancing (2014) — Ballerina Stakes winner
- Mr Money (2016) — West Virginia Derby, Indiana Derby, Pat Day Mile Stakes, Matt Winn Stakes, and Ack Ack Stakes winner
- Comical (2017) — Schuylerville Stakes winner
- Tiz the Law (2017) — Florida Derby, Belmont Stakes, and Travers Stakes winner
- Early Voting (2019) — Preakness Stakes, and Withers Stakes winner

== Sire line tree ==
- Tiznow
  - Well Armed
  - Bullsbay
    - Bullheaded Boy
  - Informed
  - Tiz Wonderful
    - S'Maverlous
    - In Trouble
    - Big Trouble
    - Hunter O'Rily
    - Uncontested
    - Wonderful Evil
  - Colonel John
    - Here's Johnny
    - Airoforce
    - Cocked and Loaded
    - Dalmore
    - Little Nick V
  - Da' Tara
    - Switch Hitter
  - Tizdejavu
  - Tizway
    - Bearsway
    - Our Way
    - Tizzarunner
    - Backyard Heaven
    - Prados Way
    - The Critical Way
    - Tiz a Melody
    - Ezmosh
    - Jjang Kong
    - Arts Man
    - Festival Fever
  - Mr Hot Stuff
  - Morning Line
  - Gemologist
    - Theory
    - Embalogist
  - Fury Kapcori
  - Norumbega
  - Dynamic Impact
  - Strong Mandate
  - Tourist
    - Carpenters Call
    - Tango Tango Tango
    - Mo Tourist
  - Tiz Shea D
    - Capador
    - Reflexio
  - Igor
  - Irap
  - Tiz a Slam
  - Sporting Chance
  - Dennis Moment
  - Midnight Bourbon

== Pedigree ==
Tiznow's sire Cee's Tizzy, who was raced by Cecilia Straub-Rubens, was one of California's most successful sires. At the time of his death in October 2015, he had sired 39 stakes winners and numerous California champions. His progeny earnings were more than $37 million.

Tiznow's dam, Cee's Song, was also raced by Straub-Rubens. Cee's Song produced nine foals by Cee's Tizzy, including Tiznow and stakes winners Budroyale, Tizbud, and Tizdubai, plus two Grade-I-stakes producing daughters: Tizso (dam of Paynter) and Tizamazing (dam of Oxbow). After Straub-Rubens death, Cee's Song was purchased carrying Tizamazing for $2.6 million at the 2001 Keeneland November breeding stock sale. Relocated to Kentucky, Cee's Song produced four more offspring including stakes-placed C’Mon Tiger, by Storm Cat, and his winning full sister You're Beautiful. Cee's Song died in 2011 from the infirmities of old age.

Pedigree of Tiznow
Sire Cee's Tizzy 1987	Relaunch; 1976	In Reality	Intentionally
Sire Cee's Tizzy 1987	Relaunch; 1976	In Reality	My Dear Girl
Sire Cee's Tizzy 1987	Relaunch; 1976	Foggy Note	The Axe
Sire Cee's Tizzy 1987	Relaunch; 1976	Foggy Note	Silver Song
Sire Cee's Tizzy 1987	Tizly; 1981	Lyphard	Northern Dancer*
Sire Cee's Tizzy 1987	Tizly; 1981	Lyphard	Goofed
Sire Cee's Tizzy 1987	Tizly; 1981	Tizna	Trevieres
Sire Cee's Tizzy 1987	Tizly; 1981	Tizna	Noris
Dam Cee's Song 1986	Seattle Song; 1981	Seattle Slew	Bold Reasoning
Dam Cee's Song 1986	Seattle Song; 1981	Seattle Slew	My Charmer
Dam Cee's Song 1986	Seattle Song; 1981	Incantation	Prince Blessed
Dam Cee's Song 1986	Seattle Song; 1981	Incantation	Magic Spell
Dam Cee's Song 1986	Lonely Dancer; 1975	Nice Dancer	Northern Dancer*
Dam Cee's Song 1986	Lonely Dancer; 1975	Nice Dancer	Nice Princess
Dam Cee's Song 1986	Lonely Dancer; 1975	Sleep Lonely	Pia Star
Dam Cee's Song 1986	Lonely Dancer; 1975	Sleep Lonely	Sulenan (F-No.26)

* Tiznow is inbred 4S × 4D to the stallion Northern Dancer, meaning that he appears fourth generation on the sire side of his pedigree and fourth generation on the dam side of his pedigree.

== See also ==
- List of racehorses
