= Bertrando =

American Thoroughbred racehorse

- Sire: Skywalker
- Dam: Gentle Hands
- Damsire: Buffalo Lark
- Sex: Stallion
- Foaled: 1989
- Country: United States
- Colour: Dark Bay
- Breeder: Ed Nahem
- Owner: Ed Nahem & 505 Farms
- Trainer: Bruce Headley; Robert J. Frankel (from late 1992); John Shirreffs (1994)
- Record: 24: 9-6-2
- Earnings: $3,185,610

Major wins
- Del Mar Futurity (1991); Norfolk Stakes (1991); San Felipe Stakes (1992); San Fernando Stakes (1993); Woodward Stakes (1993); Pacific Classic Stakes (1993); Goodwood Breeders' Cup Handicap (1994); Wickerr Handicap (1994)

Awards
- U.S. Champion Older Male Horse (1993); California Horse of the Year (1993)
- Last updated on April 2, 2014

Bertrando (February 18, 1989 – March 27, 2014) was an American Thoroughbred Champion racehorse. A tall colt that grew to 16 hands 2 inches, Bertrando was bred by Ed Nahem at River Edge Farm in Buellton, California. He was sired by Skywalker, that won the 1986 Breeders' Cup Classic.

Nahem began racing Bertrando in a three-way partnership with Marshall Naify's 505 Farms of Lexington, Kentucky, and Gus Headley, son of the horse's trainer, Bruce Headley. En route to being voted California Champion two-year-old colt, Bertrando won the important Del Mar Futurity and the Grade I Norfolk Stakes, one of the final preparatory races for two-year-olds going into the Breeders' Cup Juvenile. In that race, the most important of the year, Bertrando broke quickly and took an early lead. Then, from the back of the 14-horse field, the French colt Arazi began making a move. In what a 2006 National Thoroughbred Racing Association article called "the single-most spectacular performance in Breeders' Cup history", Arazi wove between horses and with two furlongs to run passed Bertrando to win.

Racing in California in 1992, the three-year-old Bertrando won the San Felipe Stakes and was second to A.P. Indy in the Santa Anita Derby. As a result of a respiratory system virus, the colt did not compete in any of the U.S. Triple Crown races. While Bertrando was sidelined for several months, Gus Headley was bought out of the partnership, and Robert J. Frankel took over as Bertrando's trainer. Near the end of the year, Bertrando returned to compete in the Malibu Stakes, finishing third. Although his 1992 performances were limited, he earned California Champion three-year-old colt honors.

At age four, 1993 was Bertrando's best year in racing. He won the San Fernando Stakes, the Woodward Stakes by 13½ lengths, and, while winning the Pacific Classic Stakes, broke the track record for 1¼ miles at the Del Mar Racetrack. He also finished second in the Hollywood Gold Cup, Metropolitan Handicap, and Breeders' Cup Classic. In the Classic, he appeared to have the race won when longshot Arcangues came from behind to claim victory. Bertrando's 1993 performances earned him that year's U.S. Eclipse Award for Outstanding Older Male Horse and the California Horse of the Year title.

Following arthroscopic surgery on a knee, Bertrando returned to race again at age five. He won the 1994 Wickerr Stakes and Goodwood Breeders' Cup Handicap. In his third attempt to win a Breeders' Cup race, he entered the 1994 Classic, where he finished sixth. After two unplaced showings in 1995, Bertrando was retired to River Edge Farm in Buellton, California, where he became a successful sire of a number of stakes-race winners. Bertrando is a direct sire-line descendant of Man o' War through his son War Relic.

He died from infirmities of old age on March 27, 2014.

== Sire line tree ==
- Bertrando
  - Stormy Jack
  - Officer
    - Elite Squadron
    - Boys at Tosconova
  - Bilo
  - Unfurl the Flag
  - Karelian
  - Liberian Freighter
  - Sierra Sunset
  - Coach Bob
  - Tamerando
