= Tiznow Stakes =

- Class: Restricted Stakes
- Location: Santa Anita Park; Arcadia, California, USA (relocated from the now closed Hollywood Park Racetrack; Inglewood, California, United States)
- Inaugurated: 2003
- Race type: Thoroughbred - Flat racing
- Website: www.santaanita.com

Race information
- Distance: 1 mile (8 furlongs)
- Surface: Cushion Track synthetic dirt
- Track: left-handed
- Qualification: Four-years-old & up
- Weight: Assigned
- Purse: $150,000 (2015)

The Tiznow Stakes is an American Thoroughbred horse race open to California-bred horses age four and older and contested on dirt at a distance of 1 Mile (8 furlongs). It has been run in late May at Santa Anita Park since 2014. Previously, it was held at Hollywood Park Racetrack in Inglewood, California, where it was run on Cushion Track synthetic dirt at 7 1/2 furlongs.

The race is named for Hall of Famer Tiznow, the only horse to win the Breeders' Cup Classic twice.

== Records ==
Speed record:

- 1:27.10 - Stella Mark (2008) at 7 1/2 furlongs
- 1:35.06 - Storm Fighter (2014) at current distance of 1 Mile

Most wins by a horse:

- 2 - Avanti Bello (2016, 2017)
- 2 - Fashionably Fast (2020, 2021)

Most wins by a jockey:

- 4 - Rafael Bejarano (2009, 2012, 2013, 2016)

Most wins by a trainer:

- 2 - Ted H. West (2008, 2015)
- 2 - Dean Pederson (2020, 2021)

== Winners of the Tiznow Stakes ==
Year	Winner	Age	Jockey	Trainer	Owner	Time
2023	The Chosen Vron	5	Hector Berrios	Eric J. Kruljac	Sondereker Racing LLC, Eric Kruljac, Robert Fetkin & Richard Thornburgh	1:36.16
2022	Brickyard Ride	5	Juan Hernandez	Craig Lewis	Alfred Pals	1:37.77
2021	Fashionably Fast	6	Tiago Pereira	Dean Pederson	Harris Farms, Inc. Per Antonsen & John John Nicoletti	1:37.14
2020	Fashionably Fast	5	Tiago Pereira	Dean Pederson	Harris Farms, Inc. Per Antonsen & John John Nicoletti	1:36.64
2019	Edward's Going Left	5	Joel Rosario	John W. Sadler	Hronis Racing LLC	1:35.81
2018	Race not held					
2017	Avanti Bello	5	Flavien Prat	Doug F. O'Neill	Keh, Richardson, Suarez, Roberts, Wonderland Racing Stables	1:35.95
2016	Avanti Bello	4	Rafael Bejarano	Doug F. O'Neill	Keh, Richardson, Suarez, Roberts, Wonderland Racing Stables	1:35.30
2015	Motown Men	6	Tyler Baze	Ted H. West	Gulliver Racing	1:35.77
2014	Storm Fighter	4	Edwin Maldonado	Bruce Headley	Golden Eagle Farm Investment	1:35.06
2013	Kate's Event	6	Rafael Bejarano	Jerry Hollendorfer	William H. Ziering	1:29.31
2012	Mobilized	6	Rafael Bejarano	Gary Mandella	Double JH Stables	1:29.47
2011	Amazombie	5	Joel Rosario	William Spawr	Sanford/Spawr	1:29.06
2010	Fantasy Free	5	Omar Berrio	A. C. Avila	Roddy J. Valente	1:28.76
2009	Liberian Freighter	4	Rafael Bejarano	Neil Drysdale	Dugan, E. King Edward Stable & Winner	1:27.74
2008	Stella Mark	4	Brice Blanc	Ted H. West	Jeffrey Sengara	1:27.10
2007	Greg's Gold	6	David Flores	David Hoffmans	William R. Boswell	1:28.90
2006	Lucky J.H.	4	Victor Espinoza	Carla Gaines	Harris Farms, Inc.	1:28.25
2005	Unfurl the Flag	5	Corey Nakatani	David Bernstein	Aishlie, Harris, Rose, et al.	1:27.49
2004	Beau Soleil	4	Victor Espinoza	Jeff Mullins	Robert D. Bone & Earle I. Mack	1:27.52
2003	Joey Franco	4	Kent Desormeaux	Darrell Vienna	Jerry Frankel	1:28.04
