= Colonel John =

American-bred Thoroughbred racehorse

- Sire: Tiznow
- Grandsire: Cee's Tizzy
- Dam: Sweet Damsel
- Damsire: Turkoman
- Sex: Stallion
- Foaled: 2005
- Country: United States
- Colour: Bay
- Breeder: WinStar Farm
- Owner: WinStar Farm
- Trainer: Eoin G. Harty
- Record: 15: 6-3-1
- Earnings: $1,779,012

Major wins
- Real Quiet Stakes (2007); Sham Stakes (2008); Santa Anita Derby (2008); Travers Stakes (2008); Wickerr Stakes (2009)

Colonel John (foaled March 4, 2005 in Kentucky) is an American Thoroughbred racehorse who won the 2008 Santa Anita Derby and Travers Stakes.

== Background ==
Bred and raced by WinStar Farm, Colonel John was sired by Tiznow, the 2000 U.S. Horse of the Year and a two-time winner of the Breeders' Cup Classic. His dam is Sweet Damsel, a daughter of Turkoman, the 1986 American Champion Older Male Horse, who was a son of U.S. Racing Hall of Fame inductee Alydar. Colonel John was trained by Eoin Harty. Colonel John is named for a service member who helped Bill Casner and his wife after their daughter was killed in the 2002 Bali bombings, and not after the paternal grandfather on 7th Heaven.

== Racing career ==
In 2008, Colonel John won the Sham Stakes and the Grade I Santa Anita Derby. His performances in these races made him an early favorite for the 2008 U.S. Triple Crown series, despite his racing experience consisting of only races on Cushion Track synthetic dirt. Ultimately, Colonel John finished 6th in the 2008 Kentucky Derby. In July, he finished third in the Swaps Stakes to Tres Barrachos and Two Step Salsa. In August, Colonel John won the Travers Stakes by a nose over Mambo in Seattle and other well-regarded contenders such as Pyro, Harlem Rocker, and Macho Again in a time of 2:03.20.

Colonel John was a finalist for the Eclipse Award's American Champion Three-Year-Old Male Horse for 2008.

After not racing since December 2008, he came back on July 31, 2009, to win the Wickerr Stakes at one mile over the infield Jimmy Durante Turf Course at Del Mar Racetrack ridden by Garrett Gomez. He then ran 5th in the Pacific Classic Stakes to the upset winner Richard's Kid. He also was entered in the Goodwood Stakes and ran second by a neck to Gitano Hernado. Colonel John closed out his career in the 2009 Breeders' Cup Classic by running 5th to Zenyatta.

== Stud career ==
Colonel John retired to stand at stud at WinStar Farm near Versailles for an initial fee of $15,000. He proved a moderately successful sire, with several stakes winners including Airoforce, Cocked and Loaded, and Dalmore. In September 2016, he was sold to the Korea Thoroughbred Breeders Association for an undisclosed price. He stood stud in Jeju-do, Korea beginning in 2017.

Colonel John is the damsire of 2024 Kentucky Derby winner Mystik Dan.

=== Notable progeny ===
c = colt, f = filly, g = gelding

Foaled	Name	Sex	Major Wins
2011	Concave	f	2013 Sorrento Stakes
2011	Southern Honey	f	2014 Winning Colors Stakes
2013	Airoforce	c	2015 Bourbon Stakes, Kentucky Jockey Club Stakes
2013	Cocked and Loaded	c	2015 Iroquois Stakes
2013	Dalmore	c	2016 Affirmed Stakes
2014	Colonelsdarktemper	c	2017 West Virginia Derby
2014	La Coronel	f	2016 Jessamine Stakes, 2017 Appalachian Stakes, Edgewood Stakes, Queen Elizabeth II Challenge Cup Stakes
2015	Gentle Ruler	f	2019 & 2020 Robert G. Dick Memorial Stakes, 2019 Dowager Stakes
2015	Mirth	f	2019 Rodeo Drive Stakes
2015	Texas Wedge	c	2020 Joe Hernandez Stakes
