= Folklore (horse) =

American-bred Thoroughbred racehorse

- Sire: Tiznow
- Grandsire: Cees Tizzy
- Dam: Contrive
- Damsire: Storm Cat
- Sex: Filly
- Country: United States
- Trainer: D. Wayne Lukas
- Earnings: $945,500

Major wins
- Breeders' Cup wins: Breeders' Cup Juvenile Fillies (2005)

Awards
- Champion Juvenile Filly (2005)

Folklore (born 2003) is a retired American Thoroughbred racing filly. In 2005, she won the Breeders' Cup Juvenile Fillies and won an Eclipse Award for champion juvenile filly of 2005. She won the Matron Stakes by fourteen lengths and finished third in the Santa Ynez Stakes in her only start as a three-year-old. She fractured her knee in 2006 which caused her early retirement.

== Pedigree ==
Pedigree of Folklore (USA), brown filly, 2003
Sire Tiznow (USA) 1997	Cees Tizzy (USA); 1987	Relaunch (USA)	In Reality (USA)†
Sire Tiznow (USA) 1997	Cees Tizzy (USA); 1987	Relaunch (USA)	Foggy Note (USA)
Sire Tiznow (USA) 1997	Cees Tizzy (USA); 1987	Tizley (USA)	Lyphard (USA)
Sire Tiznow (USA) 1997	Cees Tizzy (USA); 1987	Tizley (USA)	Tizna (CHI)
Sire Tiznow (USA) 1997	Cee's Song (USA); 1986	Seattle Song (USA)	Seattle Slew (USA)
Sire Tiznow (USA) 1997	Cee's Song (USA); 1986	Seattle Song (USA)	Incantation (USA)
Sire Tiznow (USA) 1997	Cee's Song (USA); 1986	Lonely Dancer (CAN)	Nice Dancer (CAN)
Sire Tiznow (USA) 1997	Cee's Song (USA); 1986	Lonely Dancer (CAN)	Sleep Lonely (USA)
Dam Contrive (USA) 1998	Storm Cat (USA); 1983	Storm Bird (CAN)	Northern Dancer (CAN)
Dam Contrive (USA) 1998	Storm Cat (USA); 1983	Storm Bird (CAN)	South Ocean (CAN)
Dam Contrive (USA) 1998	Storm Cat (USA); 1983	Terlingua (USA)	Secretariat (USA)
Dam Contrive (USA) 1998	Storm Cat (USA); 1983	Terlingua (USA)	Crimson Saint (USA)
Dam Contrive (USA) 1998	Jeano (USA); 1988	Fappiano (USA)	Mr. Prospector
Dam Contrive (USA) 1998	Jeano (USA); 1988	Fappiano (USA)	Killaloe
Dam Contrive (USA) 1998	Jeano (USA); 1988	Basie (USA)	In Reality (USA)†
Dam Contrive (USA) 1998	Jeano (USA); 1988	Basie (USA)	Stolen Base (USA)

† indicates inbreeding
