= Tiznow Handicap =

- Class: Ungraded Stakes
- Location: Louisiana Downs; Bossier City, Louisiana, United States
- Inaugurated: 2008
- Race type: Thoroughbred - Flat racing
- Website: Louisiana Downs

Race information
- Distance: 8.5 furlongs (1 1/16 miles)
- Surface: Dirt
- Track: Left-handed
- Qualification: Three-year-olds & up
- Weight: Assigned
- Purse: $150,000

The Tiznow Handicap is an American Thoroughbred horse race at Louisiana Downs in Bossier City, Louisiana whose inaugural running took place on September 20, 2008. Contested on dirt over a distance of 8.5 furlongs (1 1/16 miles), it is open to horses age three and older.

Part of the Breeders' Cup Challenge series, the winner of the 2008 Tiznow Handicap automatically qualified for the Breeders' Cup Dirt Mile.

== Records ==
Speed record:

- 1:44.22 - Jonesboro (2008)

== Winners of the Tiznow Handicap ==
Year	Winner	Age	Jockey	Trainer	Owner	Time
2008	Jonesboro	6	Robby Albarado	Randy Morse	Michael Langford	1:44.22
2007	Silent Pleasure	4	Tracy Herbert	Howard Scarberry	S and S Stables LLC (Scarberry)	1:45.97
