= Lottery Winner (horse) =

American thoroughbred racehorse

- Sire: Apalachee (USA)
- Grandsire: Round Table
- Dam: Dr. Penny Binn
- Damsire: Seat of Power
- Sex: Gelding
- Foaled: March 19, 1989
- Country: USA
- Breeder: Moreton Binn
- Owner: Ernest Auerbach
- Trainer: Darrell Vienna
- Record: 39:7-7-4
- Earnings: $487,425

Major wins
- Goodwood Breeders' Cup Handicap (1993)

Lottery Winner (foaled March 19, 1989) is an American Thoroughbred racehorse who won the 1993 Goodwood Breeders' Cup Handicap.

== Career ==
His first race was at Santa Anita Park on November 11, 1991, where he came in 9th place.

The horse did not see victory until August 22, 1992, at Del Mar, which started a streak where he won 3 races in a row.

The highlight of his career took place on October 17, 1993, when he won the 1993 Goodwood Breeders' Cup Handicap.

The last win of his career took place on April 24, 1994, at the 1994 Bates Motel Handicap at Santa Anita Park.

The horse's last race was at Del Mar on August 16, 1995, where he finished 4th.

== Pedigree ==
Pedigree of Lottery Winner (USA), 1989
Sire Apalachee(USA) 1971	Round Table (USA); 1954	Princequillo (IRE)	Prince Rose
Sire Apalachee(USA) 1971	Round Table (USA); 1954	Princequillo (IRE)	Cosquilla
Sire Apalachee(USA) 1971	Round Table (USA); 1954	Knights Daughter (GB)	Sir Cosmo
Sire Apalachee(USA) 1971	Round Table (USA); 1954	Knights Daughter (GB)	Feola
Sire Apalachee(USA) 1971	Moccasin (USA); 1963	Nantallah (USA)	Nasrullah
Sire Apalachee(USA) 1971	Moccasin (USA); 1963	Nantallah (USA)	Shimmer
Sire Apalachee(USA) 1971	Moccasin (USA); 1963	Rough Shod (GB)	Gold Bridge
Sire Apalachee(USA) 1971	Moccasin (USA); 1963	Rough Shod (GB)	Dalmary
Dam Dr. Penny Binn 1975	Seat of Power (USA); 1970	Bold Ruler (USA)	Nasrullah
Dam Dr. Penny Binn 1975	Seat of Power (USA); 1970	Bold Ruler (USA)	Miss Disco
Dam Dr. Penny Binn 1975	Seat of Power (USA); 1970	Beaver Street (IRE)	My Babu
Dam Dr. Penny Binn 1975	Seat of Power (USA); 1970	Beaver Street (IRE)	Wood Fire
Dam Dr. Penny Binn 1975	Tuscanny Bell (USA); 1956	Tuscany (USA)	The Rhymer
Dam Dr. Penny Binn 1975	Tuscanny Bell (USA); 1956	Tuscany (USA)	Roman Matron
Dam Dr. Penny Binn 1975	Tuscanny Bell (USA); 1956	Amphispirit	Amphitheatre
Dam Dr. Penny Binn 1975	Tuscanny Bell (USA); 1956	Amphispirit	Spirit
