= Well Armed =

American-bred Thoroughbred racehorse

- Sire: Tiznow
- Grandsire: Cee's Tizzy
- Dam: Well Dressed
- Damsire: Notebook
- Sex: Gelding
- Foaled: 2003
- Country: United States
- Colour: Bay
- Breeder: WinStar Farm
- Owner: WinStar Farm
- Trainer: 1) Clive Brittain (United Kingdom); 2) Eoin G. Harty (United States)
- Record: 24:7-3-1
- Earnings: $5,179,803

Major wins
- Shadwell Farm Trophy (2006); Goodwood Stakes (2008); San Antonio Handicap (2008); San Diego Handicap (2008); Dubai World Cup (2009)

Well Armed (foaled April 4, 2003 in Kentucky) is an American Thoroughbred racehorse who won the 2009 Dubai World Cup.

== Background ==
Well Armed was sired by Tiznow out of the stakes-winning mare Well-Dressed, which places Seattle Slew on the top and bottom of his pedigree. Bred and owned by WinStar Farm, he was trained by Eoin Harty.

== Racing career ==
Well Armed raced in England but was laid up with a fractured pelvis after finishing eleventh in the 2006 UAE Derby in Dubai. He did not race again until the fall of 2007 when he finished fourth in his American debut in an allowance race at California's Santa Anita Park.

His most important win to date came on March 28, 2009, at Nad Al Sheba Racecourse when he won the Grade 1 $6 Million Dollar Dubai World Cup by a record 14 lengths over Gloria De Campeao. Well Armed has been ridden in all of his starts in the United States by Aaron Gryder.

In the San Diego Handicap at Del Mar on August 2, 2009, Well Armed made his first appearance since the Dubai World Cup in March. Informed ran down a loose-on-the-lead Mast Track in the final strides to win by a nose in the Grade 2, $250,000 race. Well Armed finished last and was found to have a small chip in his left front ankle. Surgery was performed, and he was sent to the Alamo Pintado Clinic near Solvang, California, where the chip was discovered.

Well Armed is behind the current earnings of John Henry and Lava Man and may be the second gelding to surpass the $6 million zone.
