= Louisiana Downs =

Racetrack and casino in Bossier City, Louisiana

Coordinates: 32°32′50″N 93°37′29″W

Louisiana Downs Casino & Racetrack
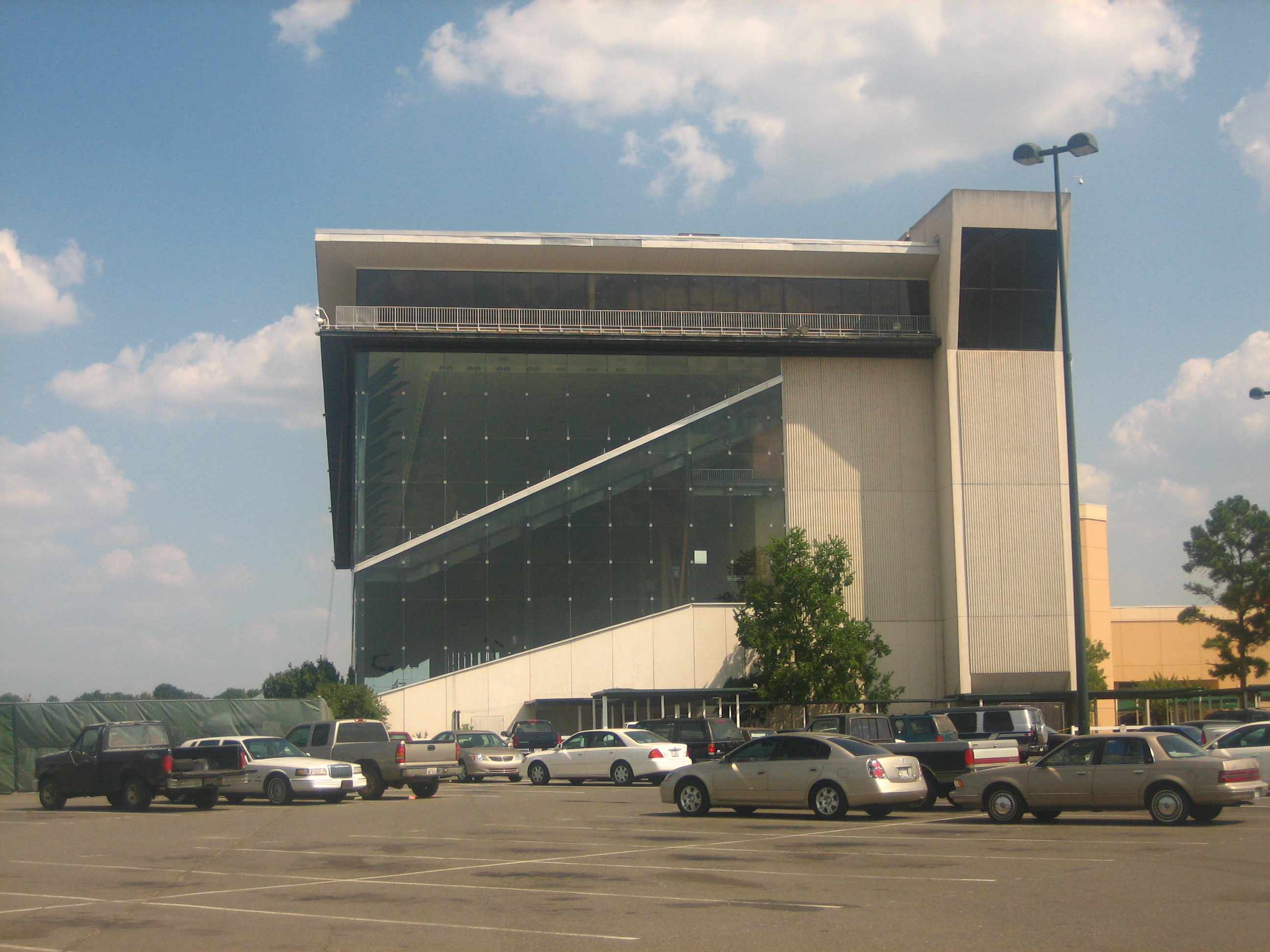
- Spectator stands at Louisiana Downs
- Interactive map of Louisiana Downs Casino & Racetrack
- Location: Bossier City, Louisiana; 8000 E. Texas St. Bossier City, Louisiana 71111
- Opened: 1974
- Gaming space: 150,000 square feet (14,000 m^{2})
- Casino type: Racino
- Owner: Rubico Acquisition Corp
- Website: ladowns.com

Louisiana Downs Casino & Racetrack is a horse racing track and racino located in Bossier City in northwestern Louisiana. It opened in 1974. The casino features over 800 slot machines. The track specification is a dirt track of 1 mi (1.609 km) & turf course of 0.875 mi (1.408 km).

== History ==
Louisiana Downs was built by shopping center developer Edward J. DeBartolo Sr., of Cleveland, Ohio, a longtime supporter of horse racing; it was third race track that he developed, along with Thistledown in North Randall, Ohio, and Remington Park in Oklahoma City, Oklahoma.

In its first year of operation, more than 300,000 wagered in excess of $23 million. In 1983, 1.3 million fans wagered $224 million in the 125-day racing season.

Harrah's Entertainment (later Caesars Entertainment) purchased the track in 2002. In October 2017, ownership of the property was transferred to Vici Properties as part of a corporate spin-off, and it was leased back to Caesars.

In September 2020, it was announced that Caesars Entertainment and VICI Properties are selling Harrah's Louisiana Downs to Rubico Acquisition Corp. for $22 million with the deal expected to close at the end of the year or early in 2021.

In November 2021, the sale to Rubico Acquisition Corp was completed and the property transitioned to Louisiana Downs Casino & Racetrack dropping the Harrah's moniker.

== Racing ==
The Thoroughbred meet takes place from early May through late September or early October. A quarter horse meet is held from January through March.

The track's most notable race is the Super Derby, a race first ran in September 1980 now at the current distance of 1 1/8 miles (1,800 m). It was once a top race for 3 yo's and horses such as Alysheba, Sunday Silence,Tiznow won the race. The race, along with the track suffered a precipitous decline and was moved to the turf for 2 years and was placed on hiatus from 2020-2022. It was brought back in 2023 with a $200,000 purse.

== Sources ==
- Onken, Alex (2021-11-01), Rubico Acquisition Corporation officially takes over Louisiana Downs, KSLA News
