= Super Diamond =

Neil Diamond tribute act

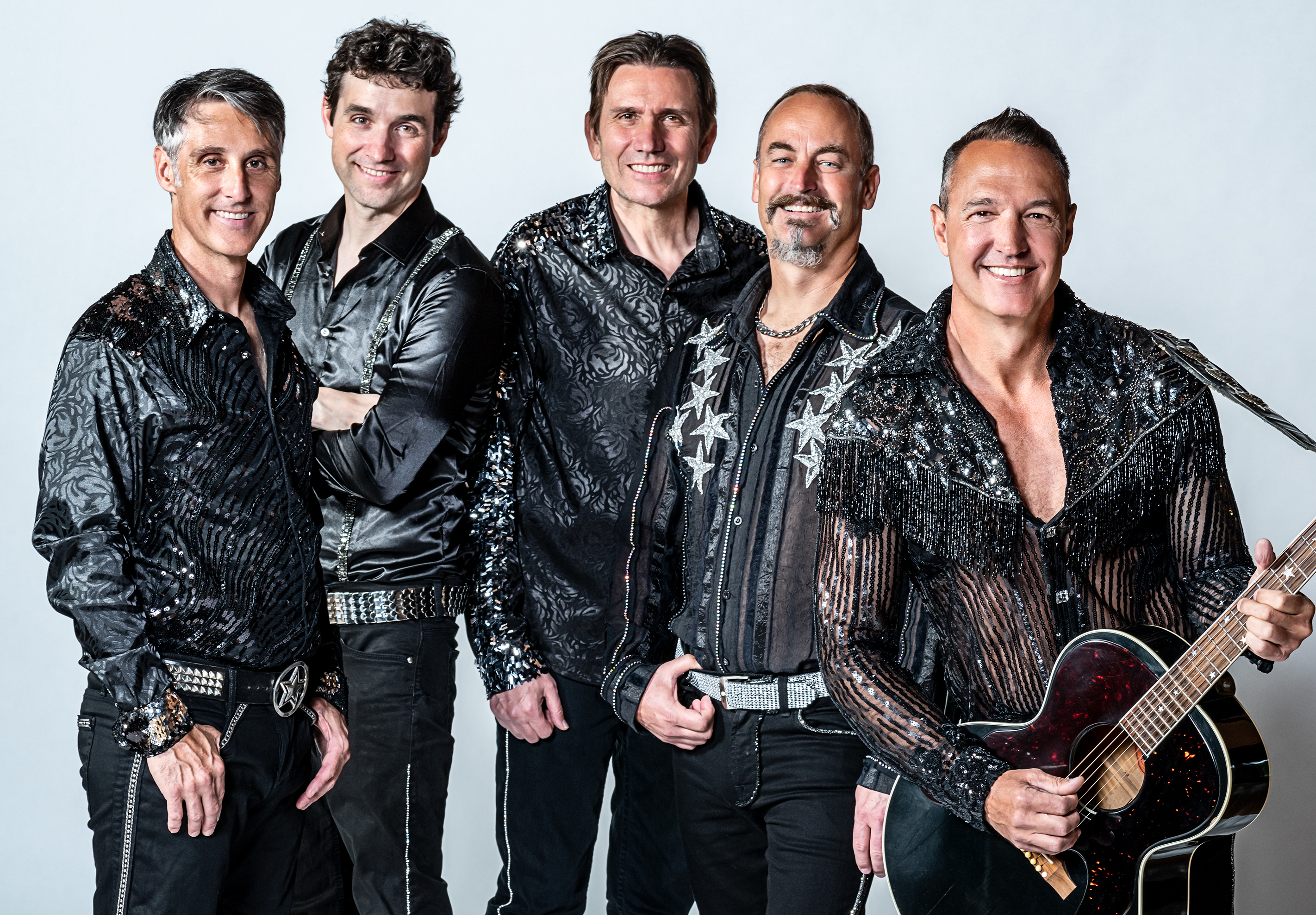
- Super Diamond 2022 - Left to Right: James Terris, Chris Collins, Vince Littleton, Rama Kolesnikow & Randy Cordeiro (Photo: Jay Blakesberg)

Background information
- Origin: San Francisco
- Members: Randy Cordeiro, Rama Kolesnikow, James Terris, Vince Littleton & Chris Collins
- Website: www.superdiamond.com

Super Diamond is a Neil Diamond tribute band from San Francisco. Formed in 1993, the line-up consists of vocalist Randy Cordeiro (Surreal Neil), guitarist Chris Collins, keyboardist James Terris, bass player/keyboardist Rama Kolesnikow and drummer Vince Littleton. Super Diamond has been featured in articles in many national publications and has appeared on the David Letterman Show. The San Francisco Chronicle has recently said, "Super Diamond does Neil Diamond without any irony, but with loving enthusiasm — and a lot of practice." In 2003 Sid Bernstein in The New York Times wrote, "Super Diamond interprets Mr. Diamond's pop tunes with heavier guitars, mixing in contemporary riffs by Guns N' Roses, Kiss, and AC/DC, and with an alternative-rock tone.".

== Early days in San Francisco ==
Super Diamond's early performances in San Francisco were at notorious alternative rock venues such as the Paradise Lounge, Slim's, and the DNA Lounge. The band quickly progressed to regular shows at The Fillmore, The Great American Music Hall and Bimbo's 365 Club. Much to Super Diamond's astonishment and delight, they found a plentiful and enthusiastic audience ready to celebrate Neil Diamond's musical legacy. Sell-out shows at all these venues ensued.

== Touring nationally ==
In the mid nineties Super Diamond began to expand their fan base with forays into Los Angeles, San Diego, Portland, and Seattle. Before the wider use of the internet and well before social media, Super Diamond generated a new audience in each of these out-of-town markets, relying principally on word-of-mouth. Early shows at the Crocodile in Seattle, The Belly Up Tavern in Solana Beach, and the House of Blues in West Hollywood were well attended and quickly built up to sell-out engagements. Spring-boarding on this, Super Diamond gained audiences at Irving Plaza in New York City, 930 Club in Washington DC, House of Blues in Chicago, Ogden Theater in Denver, The Paradise Rock Club in Boston, and many other venues across the country. “We've been traveling the country and spreading the good word of Neil for 15 years now,” Cordeiro said in a phone interview. He and the rest of Super Diamond were just about to go on stage at a House of Blues in San Diego — one of their 110 shows per year. “When we first started it, we never thought it would be a national thing,” Cordeiro, who is also known as Surreal Neil, said. "We thought it would be a little San Francisco band. Now this is how we're making our living. It was a pleasant surprise to find out there was a market for it." Continuous sell out shows across the country lead to Super Diamond appearing on CNN, Fox News, Comedy Central, Axis TV, and The Late Show with David Letterman. Super Diamond has also performed twice at the Hollywood Bowl.

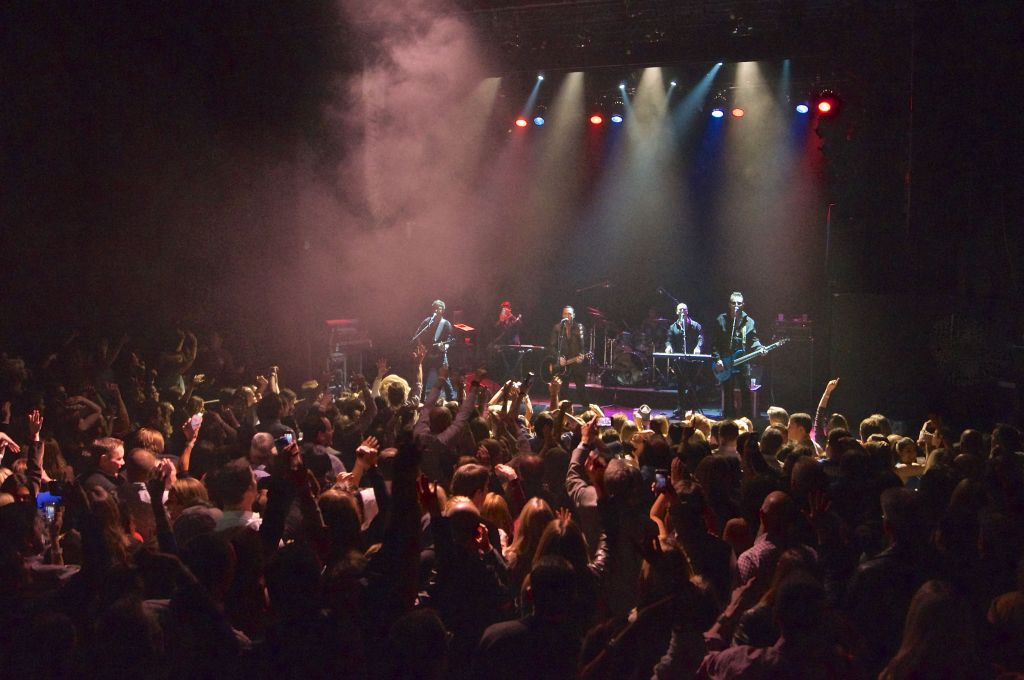
Super Diamond in New York

== Neil Diamond ==
Meredith May in the San Francisco Chronicle wrote, "Neil is a big supporter of Super Diamond. He came backstage at the House of Blues in West Hollywood and thanked the band members."I thanked him for not suing us," Cordero says. "Then he sang 'I Am ... I Said' with us. Now his steel drummer often plays with us when he's not on the road." "In 2000, Diamond finally came to see the band at the House of Blues, which is a couple of miles from Diamond's home in Beverly Hills. He came again in 2001 when Super Diamond was performing at the premiere party for the romantic comedy "Saving Silverman," in which Neil Diamond has a cameo role as himself. Both times Diamond took the stage and sang with his bizarro band. Performing with the real Neil was a blast, Cordero says. "I couldn't believe how nice and normal he seemed for someone who is a living legend"(The Morning Call 2004). "The real Neil sat in with Super Diamond at the House of Blues, singing "I Am, I Said." Or should that have been "We Are, We Said?" Says Diamond: "It is a little strange, I have to admit it, seeing someone up there trying to be you. A little weird but also fun. God bless them all, I hope they do great." "The second time Neil sang with us was for the Saving Silverman premiere party. We were contacted and hired to play the party after the screening. Neil and the cast joined us onstage for two songs, “Cherry Cherry” and “Forever in Blue Jeans". We were instructed a day or so before that we would be playing "Cherry Cherry" and possibly "Forever in Blue Jeans". So I told the band to transition right into "Forever in Blue Jeans". Terris: I think it was Columbia Pictures that released the movie. They wanted Neil to play a few songs with the cast at the film's release party, again at the House of Blues. He asked us to back him up, it was an honor, and a ton of fun." (The Stranger Seattle 2009)

== Symphony ==
Super Diamond has performed numerous shows with symphony orchestras around the country such as San Diego Symphony, Santa Rosa Symphony, Moorpark Symphony - Los Angeles, Pacific Symphony, Utah Symphony, Modesto Symphony, Phoenix Symphony, Grand Rapids Symphony, Charlotte Symphony, Tucson Symphony, Knoxville Symphony, The Desert Symphony - Palm Desert, Pittsburgh Symphony, Ocean City Pops - New Jersey, Spokane Symphony, and Buffalo Philharmonic Orchestra. At these performances Super Diamond perform Neil Diamond's repertoire with full orchestration, often with renowned conductors. Founding Super Diamond band member Rama Kolesnikow also serves as a conductor for symphony performances. On Saturday, August 10, 2024 Super Diamond where honored to perform with the Boston Pops on Nantucket Island.

== 30th anniversary ==
In 2023 Super Diamond celebrated its 30th anniversary with sold-out shows in San Francisco, Los Angeles, Seattle, San Diego and elsewhere. On March 2, 2023, Super Diamond was featured on San Francisco's KPIX Channel 5 News with Juliette Goodrich.

== Recent Press Articles ==
In September 2024 Super Diamond were featured in an article in the Hamilton County Reporter regarding their performance with the Carmel Symphony Orchestra in Carmel Indiana.

In January 2025 Super Diamond was featured in an article in the East Bay Express "Second hand songs keep our fave music fresh" by J. Poet.

== Discography ==
- Super Diamond - 14 Great Hits of Neil Diamond (1998)
- Super Diamond - Live on the Rocks (2001)
