= Eoin G. Harty =

American horse trainer

Eoin Harty
Personal information
- Born: November 23, 1962 (age 63) Dublin, Ireland
- Occupation: Trainer

Horse racing career
- Sport: Horse racing
- Career wins: 426+ (ongoing)

Major racing wins
- Madison Stakes (2006); Ballerina Stakes (2006); Santa Anita Derby (2008); Goodwood Stakes (2008); Travers Stakes (2008); Dubai World Cup (2009); Shoemaker Mile Stakes (2010); La Brea Stakes (2020); Breeders' Cup wins: Breeders' Cup Juvenile Fillies (2001)

Significant horses
- Tempera, Colonel John, Well Armed

Eoin G. Harty (born November 23, 1962) is a Thoroughbred racehorse trainer in the United States. From a family of horsemen, Eoin (pronounced Owen) Harty is the fourth generation to be involved in racing. At age sixteen he went to work at the Irish National Stud then a year later moved to the United States, working in the business in California where he still makes his home.

Harty worked for notable stables such as that of Allen E. Paulson and eventually became an assistant to trainers John Russell and then Bob Baffert. In 2000, he took charge of the training of two-year-olds for the North American division of Sheikh Mohammed's Godolphin Racing. In 2001, Eoin Harty got his big break as he conditioned Godolphin's Tempera who won the Breeders' Cup Juvenile Fillies and earned American Champion Two-Year-Old Filly honors.

In 2007, Eoin Harty began conditioning horses for WinStar Farm and has met with considerable success, notably winning the 2008 Travers Stakes with Colonel John and the 2009 Dubai World Cup with Well Armed.
