= WinStar Farm =

American Thoroughbred racing and breeding operation

Coordinates: 38.09007°N 84.661503°W

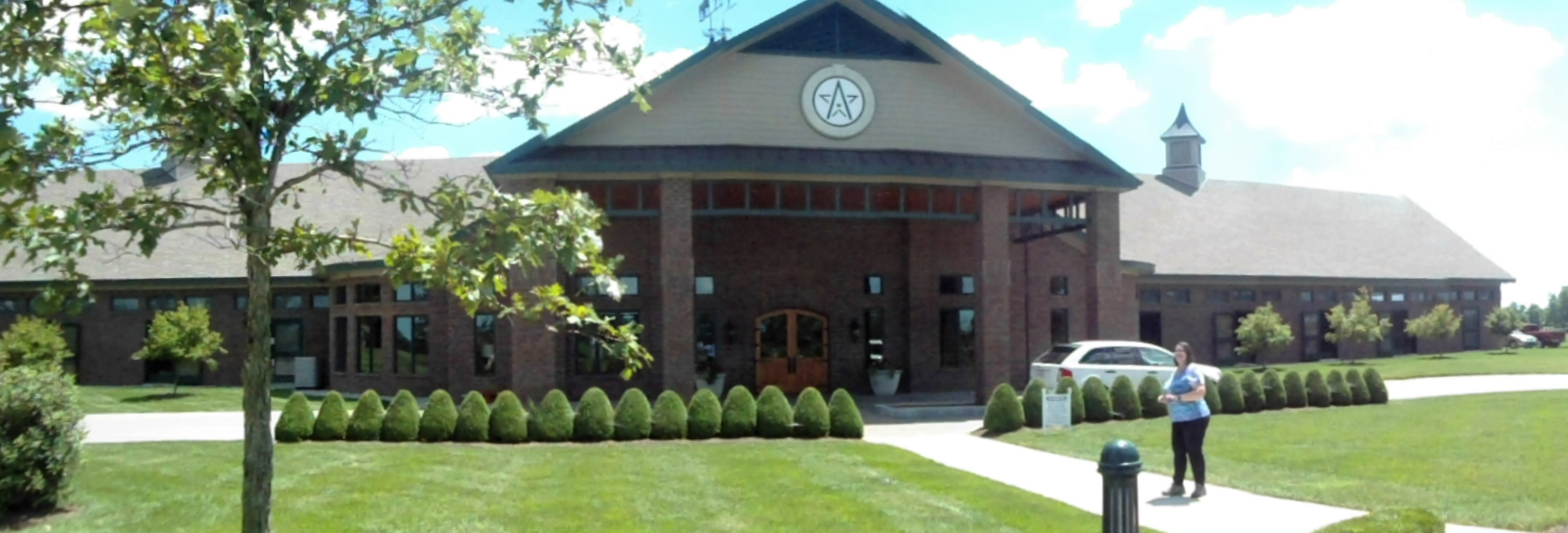
- Stallion barn at WinStar Farm

- Racing colors of WinStar Farm
- Type: Horse breeding stud farm and Thoroughbred racing stable
- Industry: Thoroughbred horse racing
- Headquarters: 3001 Pisgah Pike; Versailles, Kentucky
- Key people: Kenny Troutt Bill Casner (founding owners); Kenny Troutt (current owner)
- Website: https://winstarfarm.com/

WinStar Farm is an American Thoroughbred horse breeding and racing farm near Versailles, Kentucky, owned by Kenny Troutt. It won the 2010 Eclipse Award for Outstanding Owner and 2016 Outstanding Breeder. WinStar Farm owned 2018 Triple Crown winner Justify, 2010 Kentucky Derby winner Super Saver, 2010 Belmont Stakes winner Drosselmeyer, and 2016 Belmont Stakes winner Creator. Notable stallions that have stood at stud at Winstar Farm include two-time Breeders' Cup Classic winner Tiznow, leading sire and broodmare sire Distorted Humor, and Triple Crown and Breeders' Cup Classic winner American Pharoah's sire Pioneerof the Nile.

== Background ==
The core of the property was Silver Pool Farm, a 450-acre (180 ha) farm settled in the late 1700s by the Williams family from the Tidewater area of Virginia, which remained in that family for over 150 years. The area was first surveyed in 1788 and the original Silver Pool farm was settled by Daniel Williams, a descendant of Roger Williams. His wife, Mary, was a relative of Andrew Jackson. The couple were among the founders of the local Baptist Church. Their sons Daniel and John went on to own the Silver Pool property and it was used for raising livestock and for manufacturing products from hemp. John's grandson, Claude S. Williams, also lived there and was known as a successful and "locally prominent" farmer and stockman. The farm was known to have been owned by the Williams family at least through the 1930s.

Several buildings on the property are listed on the National Register of Historic Places. The original pond was used as a location for cutting and hauling ice. The NRHP historic portion of the property is part of the Pisgah Rural Historic District and lies mostly along Pisgah Pike road. The conforming structures include the original farmhouse from the settlement period, circa 1784–1790, when Virginia families first moved into the region. It had additions built onto it sometime after the Civil War but retains its historic character. A brick smoke house, tobacco barn that was converted to a horse barn, and the spring-fed, stone-lined pond also are listed. Along a portion of the Pisgah Pike that adjoins the property, a natural hedge of Osage orange has grown so tall that it has become a canopy arching over the road, and is also noted on the NRHP as a historically significant feature.

Over time, most of Silver Pool became part of the 400-acre Prestonwood Farm, owned by Houston, Texas oilmen Jack, Art, and J. R. Preston, whose better known horses included Da Hoss and Victory Gallop. In 2000, Kenny Troutt and Bill Casner, both with long-standing interests in horses, came together to purchase Prestonwood, renaming it WinStar Farm. Included in the purchase were the stallions Distorted Humor, still standing at WinStar and the sire of 2003 Kentucky Derby winner Funny Cide, and Kris S. Over the years, WinStar has steadily grown, incorporating land from the nearby Olsen, Johnson and Kinkead farms, and as of 2016, consists of over 2,400 acres (970 ha) housing over 20 stallions, as well as a large broodmare band and facilities for weanlings and yearlings.

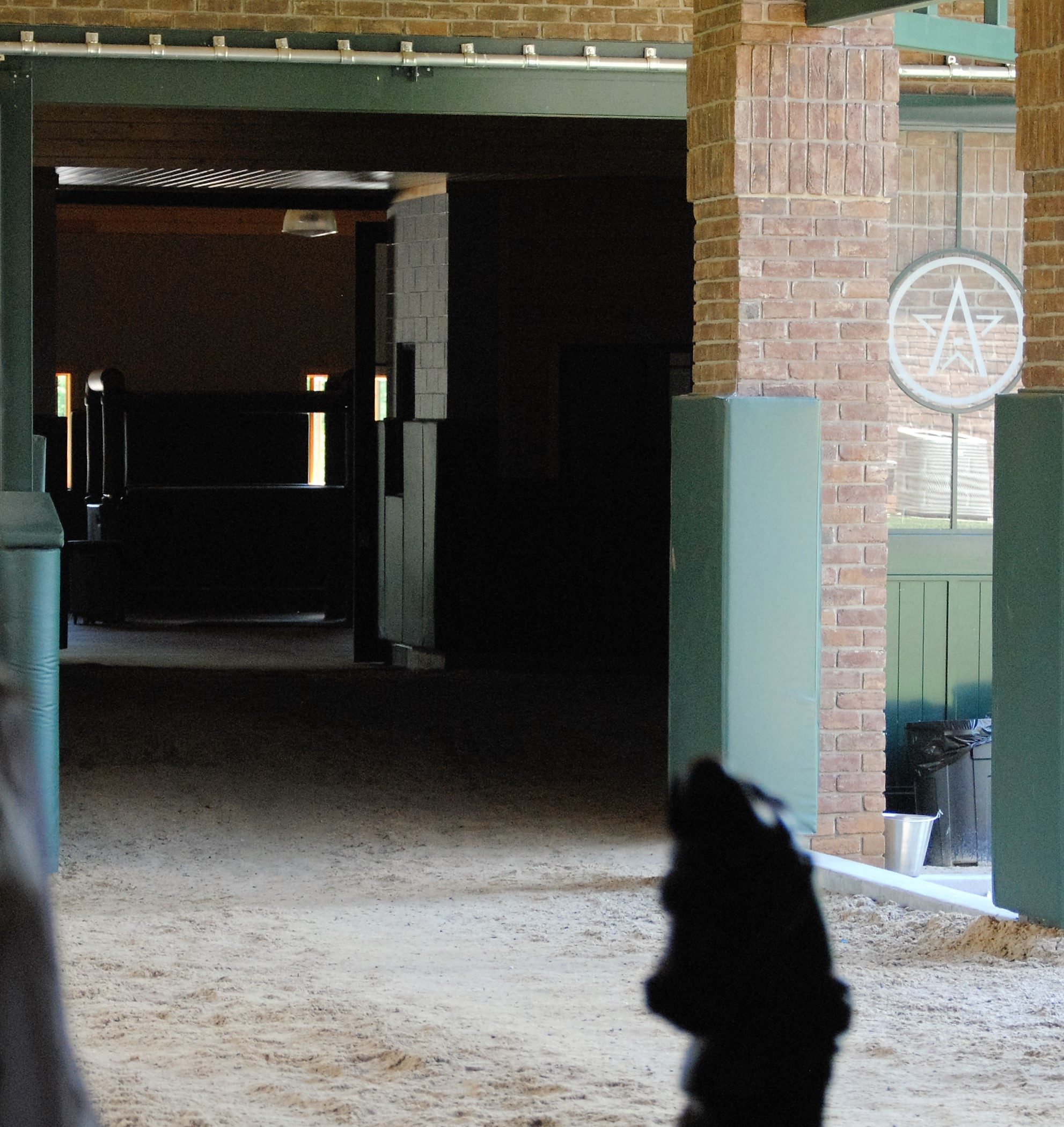
Breeding shed

In 2002, WinStar made its first major stallion acquisition —Tiznow, the only two-time winner of the Breeders' Cup Classic, having won that event in 2000 and 2001. Although Tiznow's pedigree was not fashionable, WinStar took a gamble that paid off when Tiznow became the leading freshman sire of 2005. He has ranked among the top thirty sires in North America for many years, and was among the top five sires in 2008 and 2009. He is now developing into a successful sire of sires.

Doug Cauthen, brother of jockey Steve Cauthen, was named the first president and CEO of WinStar. In 2005, W. Elliott Walden, who had trained Distorted Humor and several WinStar horses, became vice president and racing manager. In 2010, Troutt and Casner dissolved their partnership, leaving Troutt as the sole owner of WinStar. Later that year, Walden replaced Cauthen as president and CEO.

In 2013, WinStar built a new stallion barn that houses 18 stallions, with covered access to two breeding sheds and two viewing areas. There are twenty-two paddocks of 3 acres each in which the stallions are turned out each day. A secondary barn acts as a quarantine area for stallions shuttling to the Southern Hemisphere, and also houses stallions when there is no room for them in the main barn. They also have an extensive training facility for teaching young Thoroughbreds the basics of racing. Graduates of their training program include such notable horses as Songbird and Honor Code.

WinStar was a finalist for the Eclipse Award for Outstanding Breeder in 2008. WinStar won the Eclipse Award for Outstanding Owner in 2010. WinStar offers an innovative "Dream Big" program, which offers breeders the opportunity to earn a lifetime breeding right to a young stallion after producing just two live foals from his first books. Troutt said that in the volatile thoroughbred industry, the keys to survival are to not let emotions drive bidding and to always be willing to sell.

WinStar Farm won the Eclipse Award for Outstanding Breeder of 2016 after leading all North American breeders with earnings of $10,516,427, led by Tourist. Horses bred by WinStar earned 15 graded stakes wins and 239 overall wins in 2016, placing WinStar first in these categories as well.

== WinStar at the races ==
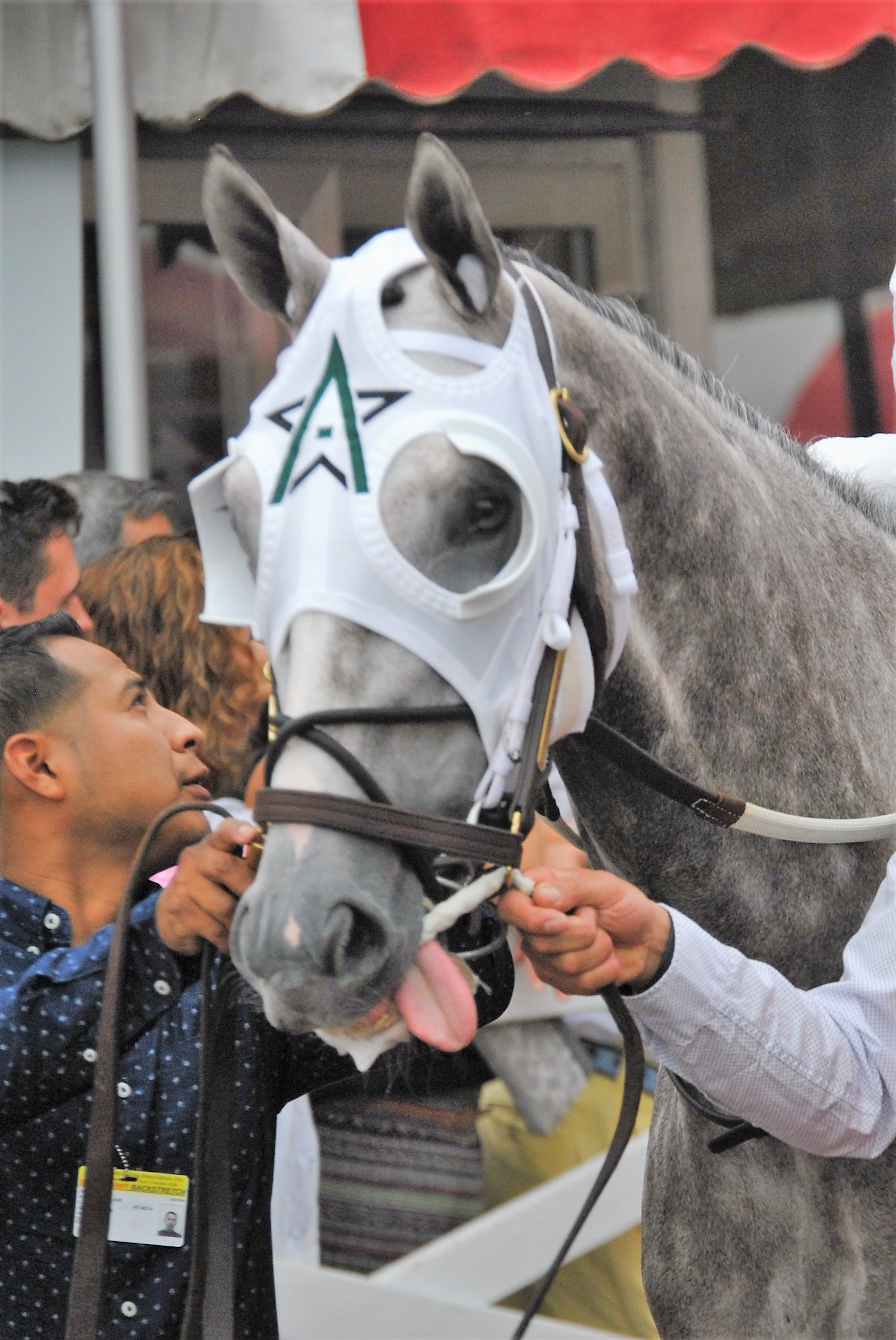
Creator in a WinStar blinker hood

Some of the most notable racehorse in Winstar's history are shown below.

- Justify, winner of the 2018 Triple Crown, a son of Scat Daddy, purchased at the 2015 Keeneland sales for $500,000
- Bluegrass Cat, won the 2006 Haskell Invitational and was second in the Derby, a homebred by Storm Cat
- Colonel John, won the 2008 Santa Anita Derby and Haskell Invitational, a homebred by Tiznow
- Well Armed, won the 2009 Dubai World Cup by a record 14 lengths, a homebred by Tiznow
- Super Saver, won the 2010 Kentucky Derby, a homebred by Maria's Mon
- Drosselmeyer, won the 2010 Belmont Stakes and 2011 Breeders' Cup Classic, a homebred by Distorted Humor
- Commissioner, won the 2015 Hawthorne Gold Cup Handicap, 2nd in the 2014 Belmont, a homebred by A.P. Indy
- Creator, winner of the 2016 Belmont Stakes, a son of Tapit, purchased at the 2014 Keeneland September sales for $440,000
- Tourist, winner of the 2016 Breeders' Cup Mile, a homebred by Tiznow

"Homebred" means WinStar owned the dam of the horse at time of foaling, not the sire.

== Justify ==
Justify was consigned to the 2016 Keeneland September Yearling sale. A partnership led by Winstar as majority owner along with China Horse and SF Racing bought the colt for $500,000. Justify was given to Hall of Fame Trainer Bob Baffert to enter training. He did not race at age two which is rare in the thoroughbred world. No horse since Apollo in 1882 had won the Kentucky Derby without racing as a 2 year old. A 136 year old drought that had come to be known as the "Apollo Curse". Justify finally made his racecourse debut on February 18, 2018, at Santa Anita Park, 77 days before the Kentucky Derby. He won his maiden by 9½ lengths in a time of 1:21.86 for seven furlongs. He followed that with a 6½-length allowance victory on March 11, then captured the Grade 1 Santa Anita Derby on April 7 in his third lifetime start.

=== Kentucky Derby ===
The 144th Kentucky Derby was run on May 5, 2018, on a Churchill Downs surface turned sloppy by heavy rain. Sent off at 5-2 as the favorite in a field of 20, Justify broke from post position seven under jockey Mike Smith and settled just off the blistering pace set by Promises Fulfilled. The victory formally ended the Apollo Curse and made Justify the first horse in 136 years to win the Kentucky Derby without a two-year-old start.

=== Preakness Stakes ===
Two weeks later at Pimlico Race Course, Justify ran the closest race of his career. The 143rd Preakness Stakes on May 19 was run in a dense fog that obscured much of the track from the grandstand, and the surface was again sloppy from rain. He would end up winning by half a length.

=== Belmont Stakes ===
Three weeks later, on June 9, 2018, Justify entered the 150th Belmont Stakes at Belmont Park. He would cross the wire 1¾ lengths ahead of late-running Gronkowski, with Hofburg another 1¾ lengths back in third, completing the mile and a half in 2:28.18. The victory made Justify the 13th Triple Crown winner in American racing history.

=== Sale to Coolmore ===
In September 2018, just weeks after his retirement from racing, the WinStar-led ownership partnership announced the sale of Justify's breeding rights to Coolmore's operation, with the colt moving to Coolmore America's Ashford Stud in Versailles, Kentucky. The deal was reportedly structured at approximately $60 million for the breeding rights plus a $15 million bonus for sweeping the Triple Crown, a roughly $75 million valuation that was reported at the time to be among the highest ever for a horse entering stud.

== Stallion Overview ==
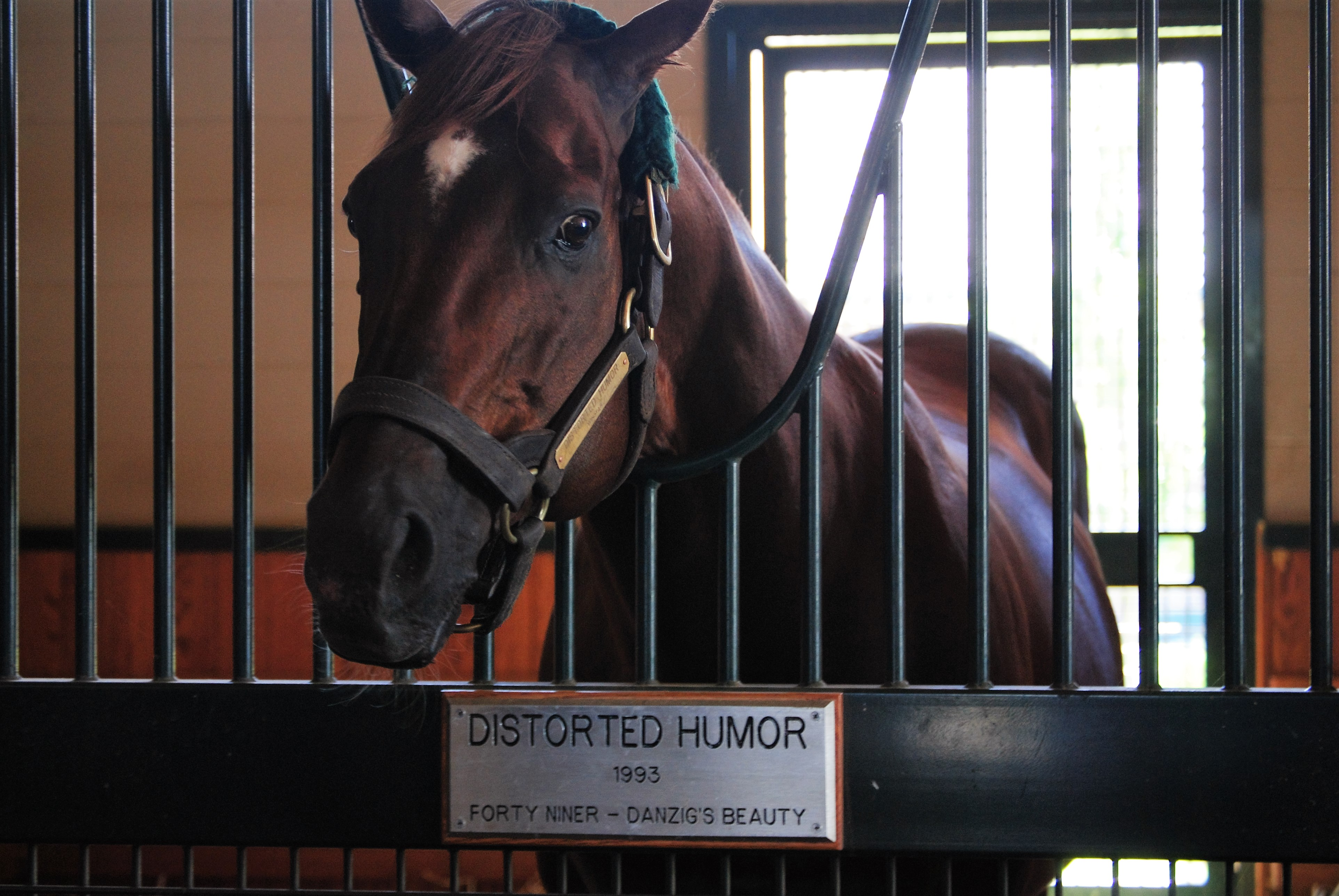
Distorted Humor greeting visitors, July 2015

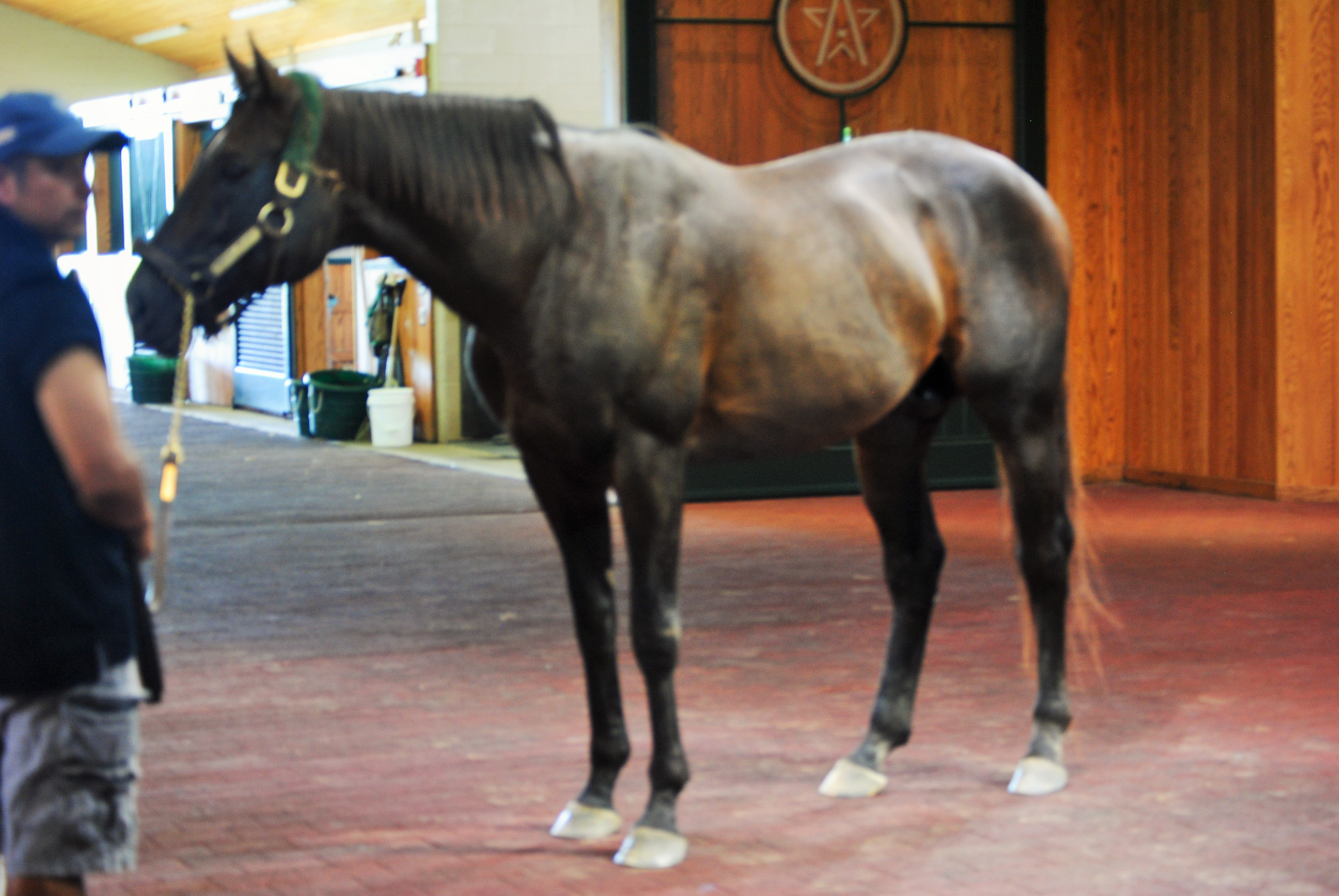
Pioneerof the Nile after a roll in the mud, July 2015

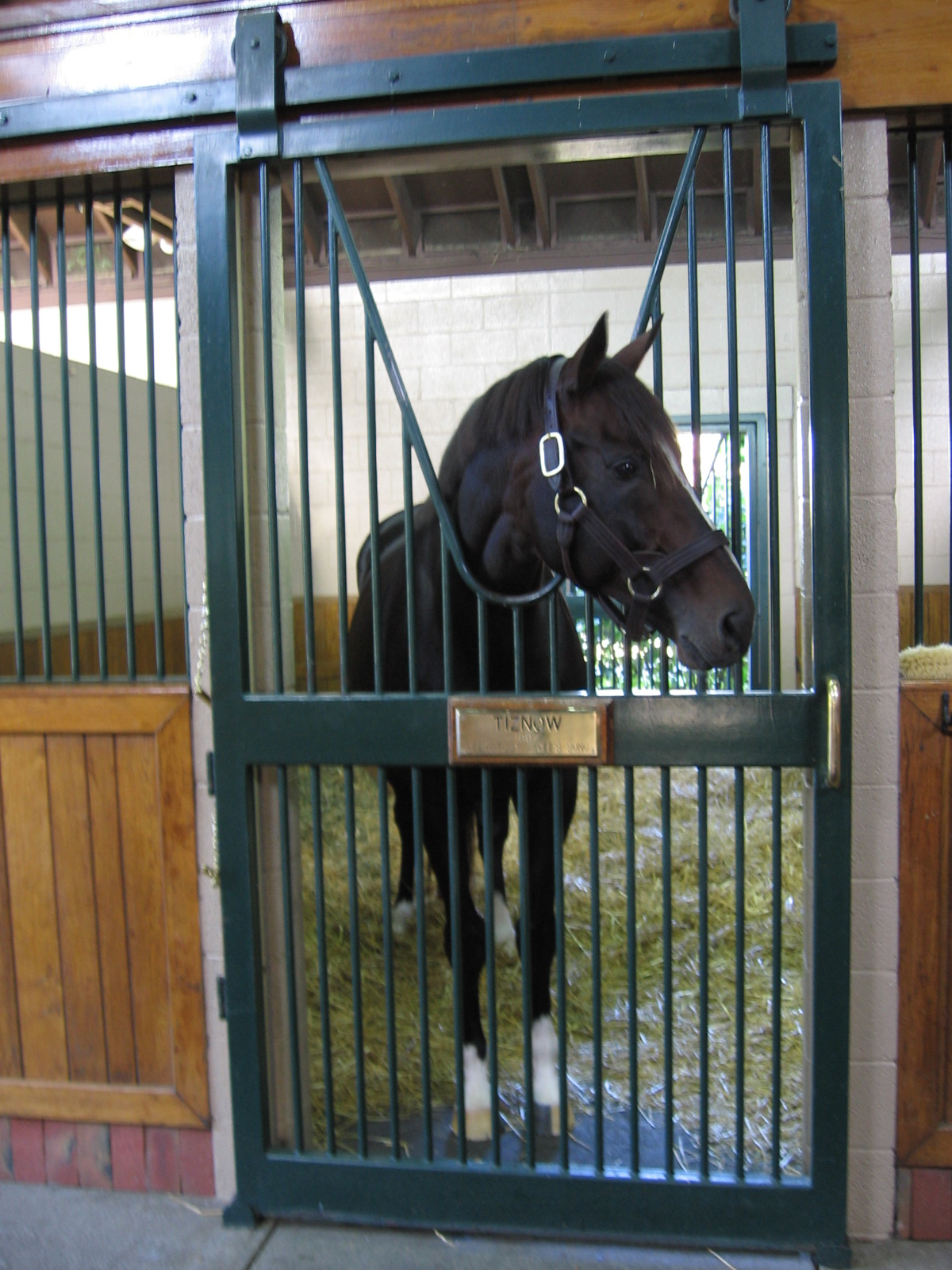
Tiznow in his stall at WinStar Farms

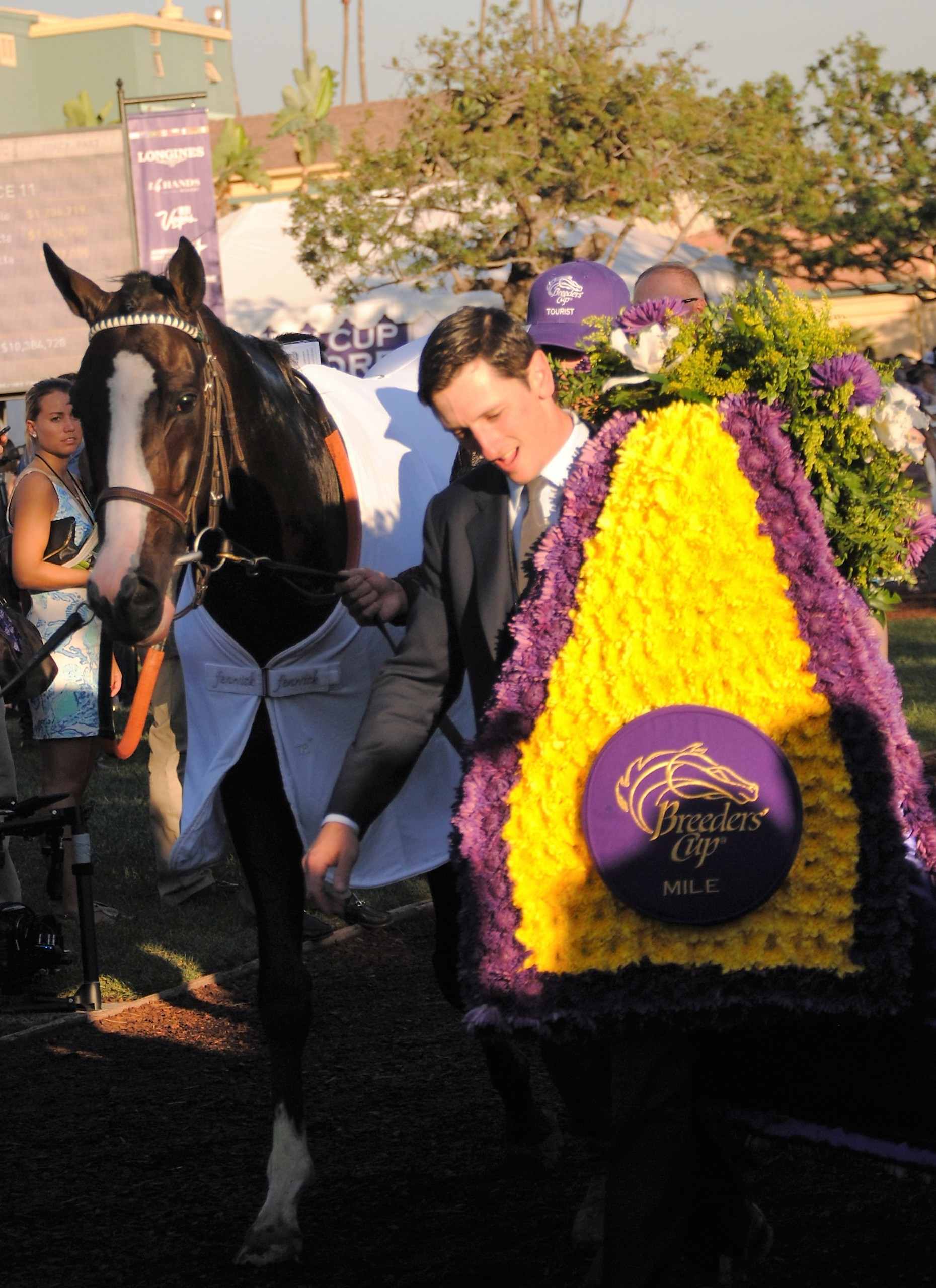
Tourist after the Breeders' Cup Mile

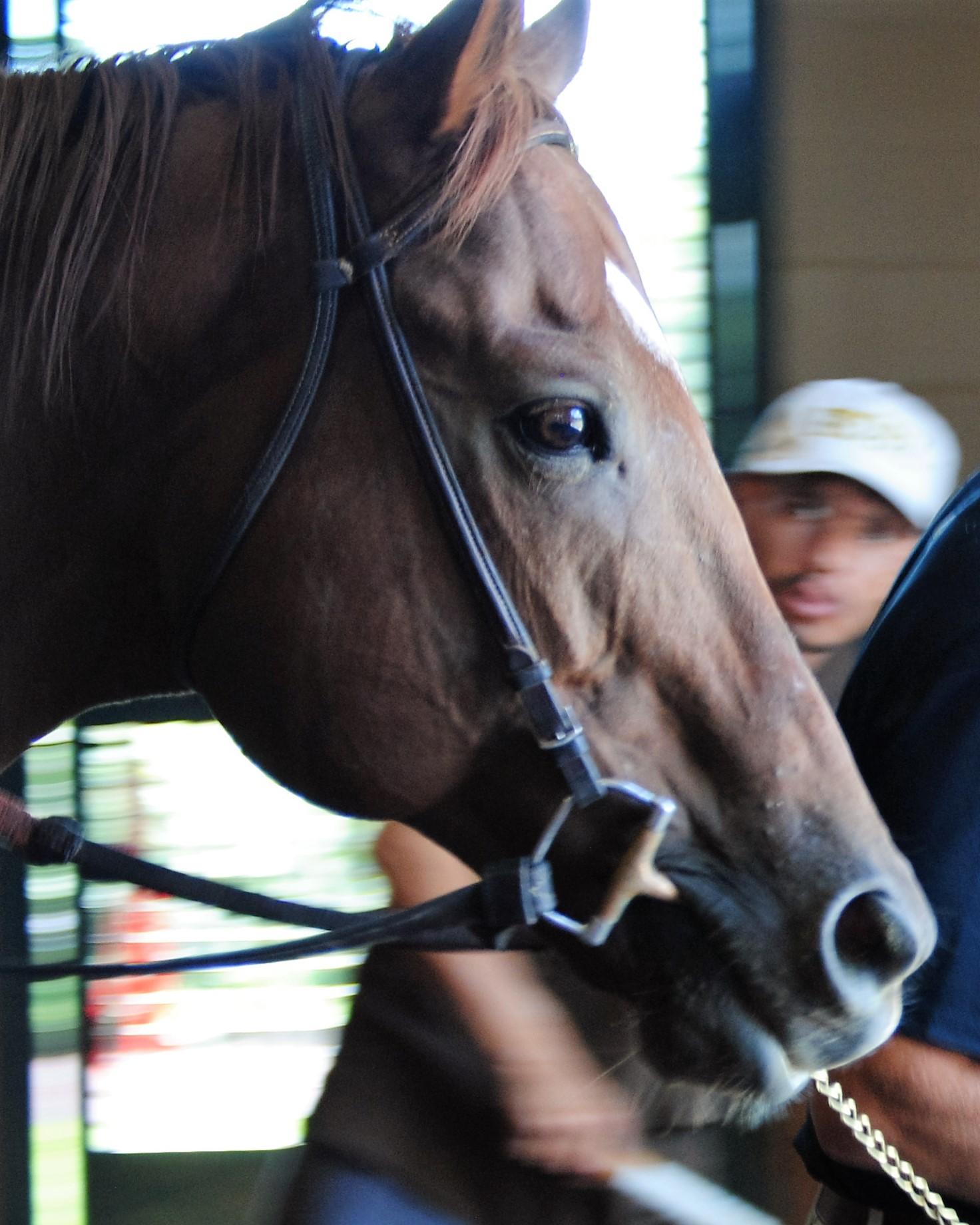
Speightstown being led out for exercise, July 2015

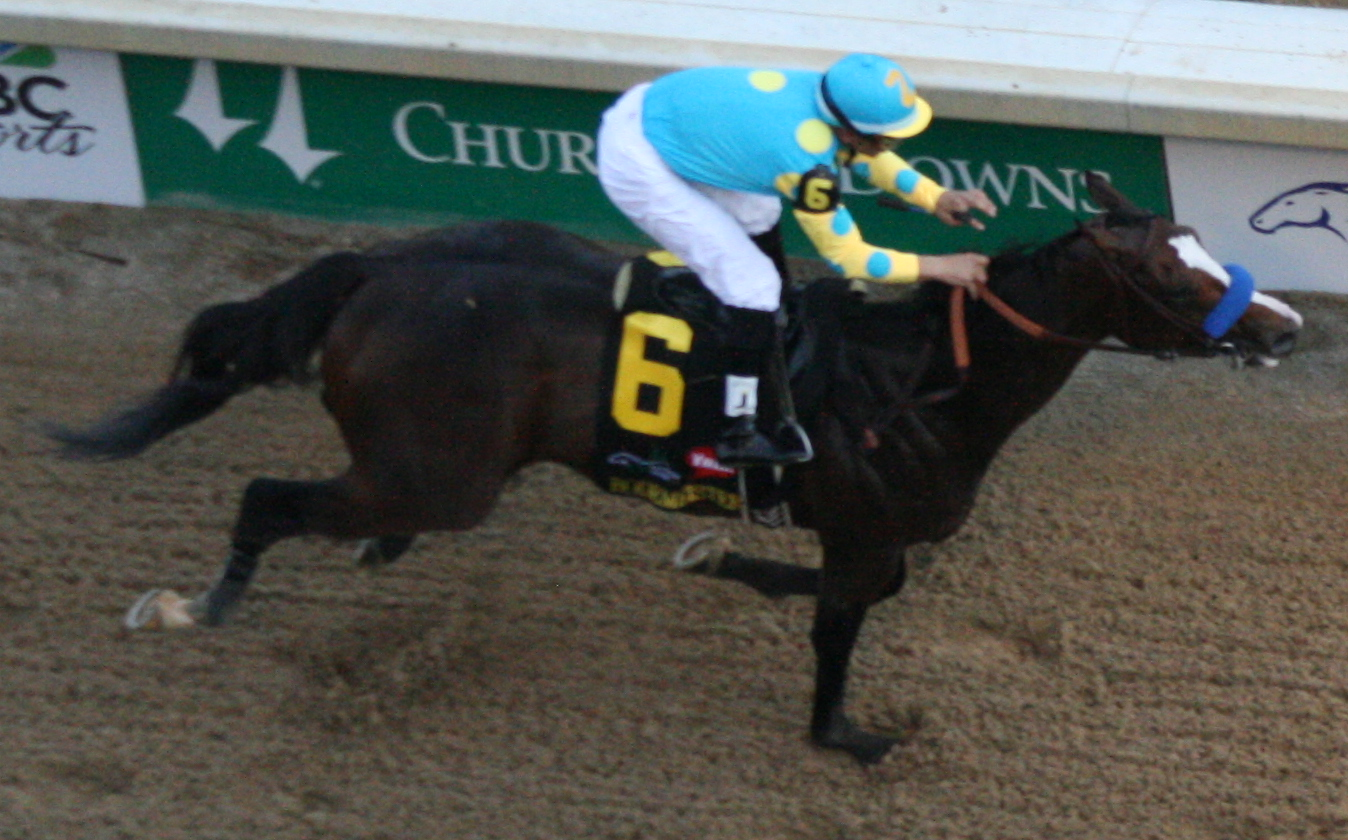
Bodemeister at the Kentucky Derby

=== Current Stallions ===
Winstar's stallion operation has been a cornerstone of the farm since its founding. Distorted Humor, acquired with the original Prestonwood Farm purchase because one of the most influential sires. He produced multiple Kentucky derby, Preakness, and Belmont stakes winners. In 2002, WinStar made its first major stallion acquisition with Tiznow, the only two-time winner of the Breeders' Cup Classic (2000 and 2001). Other notable stallions that have stood at WinStar over the years include Speightstown, More Than Ready, Congrats, Pioneerof the Nile (sire of 2015 Triple Crown winner American Pharoah), and Super Saver.

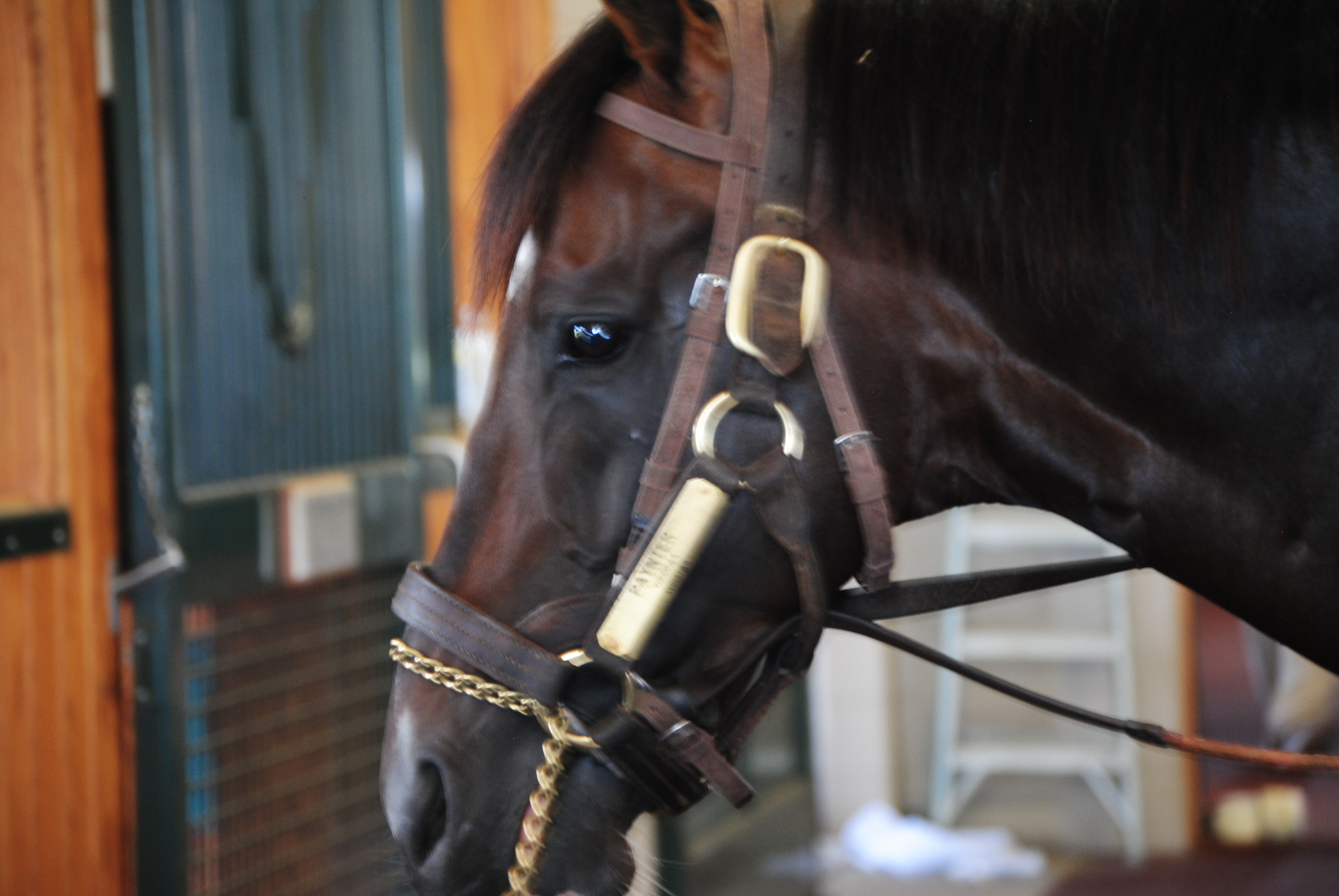
Paynter, July 2015

- 2026 Stallion Roster
  - Constitution: $110,000
  - Life Is Good: $60,000
  - Patch Adams: $30,000
  - Cogburn: $25,000
  - Timberlake: $15,000
  - Nashville: $12,500
  - Heartland: $10,000
  - Independence Hall: $10,000
  - Mullikin: $10,000
  - Straight No Chaser: $10,000
  - Audible: $7,500
  - Take Charge Indy: $7,500
  - Two Phil's: $7,500
  - Country Grammer: $5,000
  - Promises Fulfilled: $2,500

=== Some Former stallions ===
- Kris S. died in 2002 at the age of 25. At the time of his death, he had sired 63 stakes winners, including four Breeder's Cup winners and two Eclipse Award champions, with progeny earnings of $48 million. In 2003, Action this Day became his final Breeders' Cup winner and champion. Kris S. is buried at WinStar, just outside the entrance to the stallion barn
- Distorted Humor (1993) — leading sire of 2011. Notable offspring include dual Classic winner Funny Cide and Belmont Stakes winner Drosselmeyer. Distorted Humor is also a successful sire of sires, including Flower Alley, sire of Kentucky Derby winner I'll Have Another. Distorted Humor once stood for as much as $300,000, before a downturn in the bloodstock market caused his fee to decline
- Victory Gallop, the 1998 Belmont Stakes winner and the 1999 U.S. Champion Older Male Horse, was sold to the Jockey Club of Turkey in 2008
- Colonel John was sold to the Korea Thoroughbred Breeders Association in September 2016
- Drosselmeyer was sold to Stud TNT and now stands in Brazil
- Pioneerof the Nile (2006) — Sire of Triple Crown and Breeders' Cup Classic winner American Pharoah. He died of a heart attack in 2019.
- Tiznow (1997) — leading American freshmen sire of 2005 and consistently in the top rank of sires since then. His leading progeny include 2008 Belmont Stakes winner Da' Tara and Santa Anita Derby winner Colonel John. He was retired from stud duty in 2020.
- Bluegrass Cat, was retired to stud at WinStar in Kentucky but now stands at Ballena Vista Farm in California on lease.
- Super Saver (2007) — sire of champion Runhappy, was sold to the Turkish Jockey Club in 2019.
- Daredevil — sire of 2020 Preakness Stakes winner Swiss Skydiver, was sold to the Turkish Jockey Club in 2019.
- Congrats (2000) — leading freshman sire in 2010
- Harlan's Holiday
- Sidney's Candy
